= 2011–12 Gabala FC season =

Gabala
2011–12 season
- Chairman: Taleh Heydərov
- Manager: Tony Adams until 16 November 2011; Fatih Kavlak from 18 November 2011
- Stadium: Gabala City Stadium
- Premier League: 5th
- Azerbaijan Cup: Quarter-finals vs Qarabağ
- Top goalscorer: League: Dodo; Yannick Kamanan (9); All: Dodo (10)
- Highest home attendance: 5,000 vs FK Baku; 7 August 2011
- Lowest home attendance: 500 vs Simurq; 29 October 2011
- Average home league attendance: 1,616
Home colours	Away colours

The Gabala FC 2011-12 season is Gabala FC's sixth Azerbaijan Premier League season, and their second season under manager Tony Adams. On 16 November 2011, Adams resigned due to family problems. Adams' replacement was announced as Fatih Kavlak.

On 23 December Gabala revealed that Serge Djiehoua had terminated his contract with the club and that they are now seeking a new forward. On 7 January 2012, Gabala announced the signing of Yannick Kamanan from Mersin İdmanyurdu on a two-half year deal to replace the recently departed Serge Djiehoua. On 9 January 2012, Gabala and Shakhtar Donetsk announced a partnership that would see the possibility of players being sent on loan to Gabala from Shakhtar.

== Squad ==
As of match played 14 May 2012

No.	Name	Nationality	Position	Date of birth (age)	Signed from	Signed in	Contract ends	Apps.	Goals
Goalkeepers
1	Elnar Karimov	(Azerbaijan)	GK	5 April 1985 (aged 27)	Khazar Lankaran	2006		18	0
30	Graeme Smith	(Scotland)	GK	8 June 1983 (aged 28)	Hibernian	2011	2012	8	0
Defenders
3	Vurğun Hüseynov	(Azerbaijan)	DF	25 April 1988 (aged 24)	Turan Tovuz	2011			
4	Mahir Shukurov	(Azerbaijan)	DF	12 December 1982 (aged 29)	Anzhi Makhachkala	2011		21	0
5	Sergei Sokolov (Note: Sergei Sokolov was born in Stavropol, Russian SFSR, but qualified to represent Azerbaijan, representing them at senior level in 2006.)	(Azerbaijan)	DF	12 March 1977 (aged 35)	Simurq	2010			
15	Nodar Mammadov (Note: Nodar Mammadov was born in Kaspi, Georgian SSR, but qualified to represent Azerbaijan, representing them at senior level between 2007 and 2008.)	(Azerbaijan)	DF	3 June 1988 (aged 23)	Qarabağ	2010		49	4
20	Steve Olfers	(Netherlands)	DF	25 February 1982 (aged 30)	PSV Eindhoven	2010		54	0
26	Daniel Cruz	(Brazil)	DF	1 June 1982 (aged 29)	Naval	2011		23	1
34	Ürfan Abbasov	(Azerbaijan)	DF	14 October 1992 (aged 19)	Academy	2011		14	0
Midfielders
7	Yashar Abuzarov	(Azerbaijan)	MF	9 September 1977 (aged 34)	Olimpik Baku	2009			
8	Bruno Barbosa	(Brazil)	MF	15 February 1988 (aged 24)	São Paulo	2010		47	1
17	Arif İsayev	(Azerbaijan)	MF	28 July 1985 (aged 26)	Standard Sumgayit	2010		41	2
18	Aleksandr Chertoganov	(Azerbaijan)	MF	8 February 1980 (aged 32)	Inter Baku	2011		31	2
19	Rovshan Amiraslanov	(Azerbaijan)	MF	18 March 1986 (aged 26)	Inter Baku	2011		4	0
21	Elmar Bakhshiyev	(Azerbaijan)	MF	3 August 1980 (aged 31)	Neftçi	2012		9	0
24	Tarzin Cahangirov	(Azerbaijan)	MF	17 January 1992 (aged 20)	Academy	2010		11	0
25	Nuran Qurbanov	(Azerbaijan)	MF	10 August 1993 (aged 18)	MOIK Baku	2011		10	0
28	Mushfig Teymurov	(Azerbaijan)	MF	15 January 1993 (aged 19)	Karvan	2009			
	Seymur Asadov	(Azerbaijan)	MF	5 May 1994 (aged 18)	Academy	2011		1	0
	Elnur Mustafayev	(Azerbaijan)	MF	4 September 1995 (aged 16)	Academy	2011		1	0
Forwards
9	Victor Mendy	(Senegal)	FW	22 December 1981 (aged 30)	Bucaspor	2011		30	9
10	Deon Burton (Note: Deon Burton was born in Reading, England, but qualified to represent Jamaica, representing them at senior level between 1997 and 2009.)	(Jamaica)	FW	25 October 1976 (aged 33)	Charlton Athletic	2010	2012	55	15
11	Yannick Kamanan	(France)	FW	5 October 1981 (aged 30)	Mersin Talim Yurdu	2012		16	9
22	Murad Hüseynov (Note: Murad Hüseynov was born in Makhachkala, Russian SFSR, but qualified to represent Azerbaijan, representing them at senior level in 2011.)	(Azerbaijan)	FW	25 January 1989 (aged 22)	Mladost Lučani	2011		27	4
77	Dodô	(Brazil)	FW	16 October 1987 (aged 24)	Dinamo Zagreb	2011		34	10
	Amil Yunanov	(Azerbaijan)	FW	6 January 1993 (aged 19)	Academy	2011		1	1
Left during the season
6	Ljubo Baranin	(Serbia)	DF	25 August 1986 (aged 25)	Bežanija	2009			
11	Serge Djiéhoua	(Ivory Coast)	FW	25 September 1983 (aged 28)	Antalyaspor	2011		10	4
12	Pāvels Doroševs	(Latvia)	GK	9 October 1980 (aged 31)	Skonto Riga	2009		99	0
14	Veseljko Trivunović	(Serbia)	MF	13 January 1980 (aged 32)	OFK Beograd	2011		15	0
16	Kader Camara	(Guinea)	MF	16 August 1977 (aged 34)	Olimpik-Shuvalan	2010			
33	Sasha Yunisoglu (Note: Sasha Yunisoglu was born in Mykolaiv, Ukrainian SSR, but qualified to represent Azerbaijan, representing them at senior level between 2007 and 2011.)	(Azerbaijan)	DF	18 December 1985 (aged 25)	Baku	2010		46	4

== Transfers ==
=== In ===
Date	Position	Nationality	Name	From	Fee	Ref.
	GK	(Scotland)	Graeme Smith	Hibernian	Undisclosed	
	DF	(Azerbaijan)	Urfan Abbasov	Qarabağ	Undisclosed	
	DF	(Azerbaijan)	Vurğun Hüseynov	Turan-Tovuz	Undisclosed	
	DF	(Azerbaijan)	Mahir Shukurov	Anzhi Makhachkala	Undisclosed	
	DF	(Brazil)	Daniel Cruz	Naval	Undisclosed	
	MF	(Azerbaijan)	Rovshan Amiraslanov	Inter Baku	Undisclosed	
	MF	(Azerbaijan)	Aleksandr Chertoganov	Inter Baku	Undisclosed	
	MF	(Serbia)	Veseljko Trivunović	Vojvodina	Undisclosed	
	FW	(Brazil)	Dodô	Lokomotiva Zagreb	Undisclosed	
	FW	(Ivory Coast)	Serge Djiehoua	Antalyaspor	Undisclosed	
	FW	(Senegal)	Victor Mendy	Bucaspor	Undisclosed	
7 January 2012	FW	(France)	Yannick Kamanan	Mersin İdman Yurdu	Undisclosed	
20 January 2012	MF	(Azerbaijan)	Elmar Bakhshiyev	Neftchi Baku	Undisclosed	

=== Out ===
Date	Position	Nationality	Name	To	Fee	Ref.
Summer	DF	(Bulgaria)	Velichko Velichkov	Svilengrad 1921	Undisclosed	
Summer	DF	(Serbia)	Milan Antić	Kapaz	Undisclosed	
Summer	DF	(Romania)	Răzvan Ţârlea	Kapaz	Undisclosed	
Summer	MF	(Argentina)	Cristian Torres	Ravan Baku	Undisclosed	
Summer	MF	(Azerbaijan)	Namig Aliyev	Turan-Tovuz	Undisclosed	
Summer	MF	(Brazil)	Bruno dos Anjos	Atlético Monte Azul	Undisclosed	
Summer	MF	(Azerbaijan)	Goga Beraia	Dinamo Tbilisi	Undisclosed	
Summer	FW	(Azerbaijan)	Branimir Subašić	Khazar Lankaran	Undisclosed	
Summer	FW	(Netherlands)	Collins John	Mes Sarcheshmeh	Undisclosed	
Winter	GK	(Latvia)	Pāvels Doroševs	Liepājas Metalurgs	Undisclosed	
Winter	DF	(Serbia)	Ljuba Baranin	Kapaz	Undisclosed	
Winter	MF	(Serbia)	Veseljko Trivunović	OFK Beograd	Undisclosed	

=== Loans out ===
Date from	Position	Nationality	Name	To	Date to	Ref.
Summer	GK	(Azerbaijan)	Anar Nazirov	Turan-Tovuz	End of Season	

=== Released ===
Date	Position	Nationality	Name	Joined	Date
23 December 2011	FW	(Ivory Coast)	Serge Djiehoua	Boluspor	Summer 2012

== Friendlies ==
27 July 2011	Luton Town	2–3	Gabala	Luton
23:45 AZST (UTC+5)	O’Connor (1st Half); Elder (2nd Half)	Report	Mendy (1st Half); Burton (2nd Half); Dodô (2nd Half)	Stadium: Kenilworth Road

22 January 2012	Atyrau	2–1	Gabala	Antalya
	Buach 16'; Chureyev 24'	Report	Mendy 11'	Attendance: Gabala Starting XI: 12 (Latvia) GK Pāvels Doroševs (substituted off) 45'; -- (Azerbaijan) DF Abbasov; 15 (Azerbaijan) DF Mammadov; 05 (Azerbaijan) DF Sokolov; 06 (Serbia) DF Baranin; 24 (Azerbaijan) MF Jahangirov; 08 (Brazil) MF Bruno Barbosa; 25 (Azerbaijan) MF Gurbanov; 09 (Senegal) FW Mendy; 10 (Jamaica) FW Burton; -- (France) FW Kamanan; Substitutes: 30 (Scotland) GK Smith (substituted on) 45'; 33 (Azerbaijan) DF Yunisoğlu (substituted on) 45'; 04 (Azerbaijan) DF Shukurov (substituted on) 45'; 26 (Brazil) DF Cruz (substituted on) 45'; -- (Azerbaijan) MF Bakhshiev (substituted on) 45'; 18 (Azerbaijan) MF Chertoganov (substituted on) 45'; 17 (Azerbaijan) MF Isayev (substituted on) 45'; 14 (Serbia) MF Trivunović (substituted on) 45'; 77 (Brazil) FW Dodô (substituted on) 45'; 22 (Azerbaijan) FW Hüseynov (substituted on) 45'

25 January 2012	Kryvbas Kryvyi Rih	2–1	Gabala	Antalya
	70' (pen.); 89'	Report	Isayev 75'	Attendance: Gabala Starting XI: 12 (Latvia) GK Pāvels Doroševs (substituted off) 45'; 33 (Azerbaijan) DF Yunisoğlu; 26 (Brazil) DF Cruz; 06 (Serbia) DF Baranin; 04 (Azerbaijan) DF Shukurov; 08 (Brazil) MF Bruno Barbosa; 14 (Serbia) MF Trivunović; 10 (Jamaica) FW Burton; 77 (Brazil) FW Dodô; 09 (Senegal) FW Mendy; -- (France) FW Kamanan; Substitutes: 30 (Scotland) GK Smith (substituted on) 45'; 05 (Azerbaijan) DF Sokolov (substituted on) 45'; 15 (Azerbaijan) DF Mammadov (substituted on) 45'; 20 (Netherlands) DF Olfers (substituted on) 45'; -- (Azerbaijan) DF Abbasov (substituted on) 45'; 07 (Azerbaijan) MF Abuzerov (substituted on) 45'; 24 (Azerbaijan) MF Jahangirov (substituted on) 45'; 25 (Azerbaijan) MF Gurbanov (substituted on) 45'; 17 (Azerbaijan) MF Isayev (substituted on) 45'; 19 (Azerbaijan) MF Amiraslanov (substituted on) 45'

29 January 2012	Viitorul Constanța	0–1	Gabala	Antalya
		Report	Mendy 38'; Cruz (yellow card) (yellow-red card) 85'	Attendance: Gabala Starting XI: 30 (Scotland) GK Smith; 26 (Brazil) DF Cruz; 06 (Serbia) DF Baranin; 33 (Azerbaijan) DF Yunisoğlu; 04 (Azerbaijan) DF Shukurov; 18 (Azerbaijan) MF Chertoganov; 08 (Brazil) MF Bruno Barbosa; 14 (Serbia) MF Trivunović; 09 (Senegal) FW Mendy; -- (France) FW Kamanan; 77 (Brazil) FW Dodô

31 January 2012	Obolon Kyiv	0–1	Gabala	Antalya
		[ Report]	Hüseynov 30' (pen.)

2 February 2012	RNK Split	2–2 (3–4 p)	Gabala	Antalya
	Hrgović (first half)	Summary; Report	Chertoganov (first half); Cruz (second half)

== Competitions ==
=== Premier League ===
==== Results summary ====
Overall								Home						Away					
Pld	W	D	L	GF	GA	GD	Pts	W	D	L	GF	GA	GD	W	D	L	GF	GA	GD
22	10	5	7	27	23	+4	35	5	4	2	13	9	+4	5	1	5	14	14	0

Last updated: 13 August 2011.
Source: Soccerway

==== Results by round ====
Round	1	2	3	4	5	6	7	8	9	10	11	12	13	14	15	16	17	18	19	20	21	22
Ground	H	A	H	A	H	A	A	H	H	A	H	A	H	A	H	H	A	H	A	H	A	A
Result	D	W	D	W	W	L	L	L	W	D	L	L	W	L	W	D	W	D	W	W	W	L
Position	6	2	3	2	2	3	4	7	6	6	6	6	6	7	6	6	6	6	6	6	6	6

Source: Soccerway
A = Away; H = Home; W = Win; D = Draw; L = Loss

==== Results ====
7 August 2011 1	Gabala	0–0	Baku	Qabala
18:00 AZST (UTC+5)		Report; Summary		Stadium: Gabala City Stadium; Attendance: 5,000; Referee: Fariz Yusifov

14 August 2011 2	Sumgayit	1–2	Gabala	Sumqayit
18:00 AZST (UTC+5)	Orkhan Aliyev 90'	Report; Summary	Dodo 5'; Cruz 43'	Stadium: Mehdi Huseynzade Stadium; Attendance: 8,000; Referee: Anar Salmanov

18 August 2011 3	Gabala	1–1	AZAL	Qabala
17:00 AZST (UTC+5)	Shukurov (red card) 11'; Burton 50'	summary	Ibekoyi 43'	Stadium: Gabala City Stadium; Attendance: 1,000; Referee: Aliyar Aghayev

27 August 2011 4	Qarabağ	0–1	Gabala	Aghdam
17:30 AZST (UTC+5)	Sadiqov (yellow card) 76' (yellow-red card) 90+1'	Summary	Mendy 37'	Stadium: Guzanli Olympic Complex Stadium; Attendance: 2,000; Referee: Vusal Aliyev

11 September 2011 5	Gabala	2–1	Turan	Qabala
17:00 AZST (UTC+5)	Mendy 15', 54'	Summary	Artyukh 6'	Stadium: Gabala City Stadium; Attendance: 2,050; Referee: Elchin Mammadov

18 September 2011 6	Neftchi Baku	2–0	Gabala	Baku
18:30 AZST (UTC+5)	R. Abdullayev 64'; A. Abdullayev 85'	Summary		Stadium: Ismat Gayibov Stadium; Attendance: 1,000; Referee: Anar Salmanov

23 September 2011 7	Khazar Lankaran	2–1	Gabala	Lankaran
18:30 AZST (UTC+5)	Semedo 40'; Abdullayev 64'	Summary	Baranin 68'	Stadium: Lankaran City Stadium; Attendance: 11,000; Referee: Ramil Diniyev

29 September 2011 8	Gabala	2–3	Ravan Baku	Qabala
16:00 AZST (UTC+5)	M Hüseynov 7'; Dodo 77'	Summary	M Hüseynov 21' (o.g.); Pelu 35'; Barlay 52'; Suma (red card) 76'	Stadium: Gabala City Stadium; Attendance: 1,500; Referee: Jeyhun Hashimov

16 October 2011 9	Gabala	2–0	Kəpəz	Qabala
15:00 AZST (UTC+5)	Burton 41'; Barbosa (red card) 44'; Dodo 57'	Summary		Stadium: Gabala City Stadium; Attendance: 1,500; Referee: Rahim Hasanov

22 October 2011 10	Inter Baku	1–1	Gabala	Baku
19:00 AZST (UTC+5)	Accioly 20' (pen.)	Summary	Burton 58' (pen.)	Stadium: Shafa Stadium; Attendance: 1,000; Referee: Rovshan Ahmadov

29 October 2011 11	Gabala	0–2	Simurq	Qabala
15:00 AZT (UTC+4)		Summary	Shmakov 41'; Poškus 60'	Stadium: Gabala City Stadium; Attendance: 500; Referee: Fariz Yusifov

4 November 2011 12	AZAL	3–0	Gabala	Baku
16:00 AZT (UTC+4)	Schutz 50', 69'; Khalilov 90'	Summary		Stadium: AZAL Stadium; Attendance: 1,000; Referee: Anar Salmanov

20 November 2011 13	Gabala	1–0	Neftchi Baku	Qabala
14:00 AZT (UTC+4)	Chertoganov 39'	Summary		Stadium: Gabala City Stadium; Attendance: 2,500; Referee: Ramil Diniyev

25 November 2011 14	Baku	2–1	Gabala	Baku
13:30 AZT (UTC+4)	Česnauskis 17'; Parks 29'	Summary	Djiehoua 88' (pen.)	Stadium: Tofig Bakhramov Stadium; Attendance: 1,000; Referee: Elchin Mammadov

4 December 2011 15	Gabala	3–1	Sumgayit	Qabala
14:00 AZT (UTC+4)	Djiehoua 36'; Dodo 70'; Mendy 85'	Summary	Abbasov 39'	Stadium: Gabala City Stadium; Attendance: 1,000; Referee: Rahim Hasanov

10 December 2011 16	Gabala	0–0	Inter Baku	Qabala
14:00 AZT (UTC+4)		Summary		Stadium: Gabala City Stadium; Attendance: 1,000; Referee: Fariz Yusifov

14 December 2011 17	Turan Tovuz	0–1	Gabala	Tovuz
14:00 AZT (UTC+4)		Summary	Dodo 67'; Mammadov (red card) 81'	Stadium: Tovuz City Stadium; Attendance: 1,000; Referee: Elnur Muradov

20 December 2011 18	Gabala	0–0	Qarabağ	Qabala
14:00 AZT (UTC+4)		Summary		Stadium: Gabala City Stadium; Attendance: 1,000; Referee: Elchin Mammadov

16 February 2012 19	Simurq	0–1	Gabala	Zaqatala
13:00 AZT (UTC+4)		Summary	Mendy 85'	Stadium: Zaqatala City Stadium; Attendance: 0^{1} Referee: Rahim Hasanov

21 February 2012 20	Gabala	2–1	Khazar	Qabala
14:00 AZT (UTC+4)	Chertoganov 41'; Burton 90+2'	Summary	Amirguliev 26'	Stadium: Gabala City Stadium; Attendance: 1,000; Referee: Elchin Mammadov

2 March 2012 21	Ravan Baku	0–4	Gabala	Baku
16:30 AZT (UTC+4)	Vasiliev (yellow card) 76' (yellow-red card) 77'	Summary	Mendy 3'; Kamanan 9', 25'; Burton 83'	Stadium: Dalga Arena; Attendance: 300; Referee: Anar Salmanov

7 March 2012 22	Kəpəz	3–2	Gabala	Ganja
14:00 AZT (UTC+4)	Allahguliyev 72'; Fomenko 76'; Soares 88'	Report; Summary	Baranin 32'; Burton (yellow card) 35' (red card) 35'; Kamanan 85'	Stadium: Ganja City Stadium; Attendance: 2,000; Referee: Ali Mammadov

Notes

- The match is played without spectators.

==== Table ====
Pos	Team	Pld	W	D	L	GF	GA	GD	Pts	Qualification
4	Qarabağ	22	12	5	5	27	14	+13	41	Qualification for championship group
5	Baku	22	10	5	7	27	22	+5	35	Qualification for championship group
6	Gabala	22	10	5	7	27	23	+4	35	Qualification for championship group
7	AZAL	22	8	5	9	35	35	0	29	Qualification for relegation group
8	Ravan Baku	22	6	7	9	23	29	−6	25	Qualification for relegation group

Source: Soccerway: Azerbaijan Premier League Table
Rules for classification: 1) points; 2) goal difference; 3) number of goals scored.

=== Premier League Championship Group ===
==== Results summary ====
Overall								Home						Away					
Pld	W	D	L	GF	GA	GD	Pts	W	D	L	GF	GA	GD	W	D	L	GF	GA	GD
10	5	2	3	16	9	+7	17	4	0	1	11	3	+8	1	2	2	5	6	−1

Last updated: 21 December 2011.
Source: Soccerway

==== Results by round ====
Round	1	2	3	4	5	6	7	8	9	10
Ground	H	A	H	A	H	H	A	H	A	A
Result	W	D	W	L	L	W	L	W	D	W
Position	5	5	5	5	5	5	6	5	6	5

Source: Soccerway
A = Away; H = Home; W = Win; D = Draw; L = Loss

==== Results ====
11 March 2012 23	Gabala	4–1	Neftchi Baku	Qabala
14:00 AZT (UTC+4)	Dodo 18', 27'; Kamanan 78', 83'	Summary	Nasimov 68'	Stadium: Gabala City Stadium; Attendance: 1000; Referee: Aliyar Aghayev

17 March 2012 24	Qarabağ	1–1	Gabala	Aghdam
15:00 AZT (UTC+4)	Gurbanov 90'	Summary	Mendy 17'	Stadium: Guzanli Olympic Complex Stadium; Attendance: 2,000; Referee: Rauf Jabbarov

24 March 2012 25	Gabala	2–1	Inter Baku	Qabala
15:00 AZT (UTC+4)	Kamanan 61'; Burton 83'	Summary	Hajiyev 77'; Mustafayev (red card) 89'	Stadium: Gabala City Stadium; Attendance: 2,000; Referee: Anar Salmanov

31 March 2012 26	Baku	2–1	Gabala	Baku
15:00 AZST (UTC+5)	Parks 57'; Šolić 90+3'	Summary	Kamanan 16'	Stadium: Tofig Bakhramov Stadium; Attendance: 350; Referee: Rauf Jabbarov

6 April 2012 27	Gabala	0–1	Khazar Lankaran	Qabala
16:00 AZST (UTC+5)		Summary	Subašić 3'	Stadium: Gabala City Stadium; Attendance: 2,500; Referee: Anar Salmanov

14 April 2012 28	Gabala	1–0	Qarabağ	Qabala
16:00 AZST (UTC+5)	Kamanan 70'	Summary		Stadium: Gabala City Stadium; Attendance: 1,500; Referee: Rahim Hasanov

22 April 2012 29	Inter Baku	2–1	Gabala	Baku
18:00 AZST (UTC+5)	Hajiyev 25'; Niasse 31'	Summary	Dodo 8'; Shukurov (yellow card) 57' (yellow-red card) 81'	Stadium: Shafa Stadium; Attendance: 1,000; Referee: Elvin Askerov

29 April 2012 30	Gabala	4–0	Baku	Qabala
17:00 AZST (UTC+5)	Kamanan 37'; Hüseynov 47'; Mendy 58'; Mammadov 90+2'	Summary		Stadium: Gabala City Stadium; Attendance: 800; Referee: Rauf Jabbarov

5 May 2012 31	Khazar Lankaran	1–1	Gabala	Lankaran
17:30 AZST (UTC+5)	Piţ 59'	Summary	Mendy 87'	Stadium: Lankaran City Stadium; Attendance: 8,000; Referee: Rahim Hasanov

11 May 2012 32	Neftchi Baku	0–1	Gabala	Baku
17:30 AZST (UTC+5)		Summary	Yunanov 87'	Stadium: Ismat Gayibov Stadium; Attendance: 1,500; Referee: Fariz Yusifov

==== Table ====
Pos	Team	Pld	W	D	L	GF	GA	GD	Pts	Qualification or relegation
1	Neftçi Baku (C)	32	20	3	9	55	30	+25	63	Qualification for Champions League second qualifying round
2	Khazar Lankaran	32	17	8	7	44	28	+16	59	Qualification for Europa League first qualifying round (Note: Baku qualified for the first qualifiying round of the 2012–13 UEFA Europa League as winner of the 2011–12 Azerbaijan Cup.)
3	Inter Baku	32	16	8	8	29	21	+8	56	Qualification for Europa League first qualifying round
4	Qarabağ	32	15	8	9	37	28	+9	53	
5	Gabala	32	15	7	10	43	32	+11	52	
6	Baku	32	15	5	12	42	37	+5	50	Qualification for Europa League first qualifying round

Source: Soccerway.com
Rules for classification: 1) points; 2) goal difference; 3) number of goals scored.
(C) Champions

=== Azerbaijan Cup ===
29 November 2011 Last 16	Gabala	3–0	Neftchala	Qabala
13:00 AZT (UTC+4)	Djiehoua 3' (pen.), 57'; Yunisoğlu 74'	Summary		Stadium: Gabala City Stadium; Attendance: 300; Referee: Rauf Jabbarov

14 March 2012 Quarterfinals 1st leg	Gabala	2–2	Qarabağ	Qabala
14:00 AZT (UTC+4)	Mendy 42'; Dodo 66'	Report	Aliyev 46'; Muarem 90'	Stadium: Gabala City Stadium; Attendance: 1,000; Referee: Fariz Yusifov

28 March 2012 Quarterfinals 2nd leg	Qarabağ	0–0 (2–2 agg.)	Gabala	Aghdam
15:00 AZT (UTC+4)		Summary		Stadium: Guzanli Olympic Complex Stadium; Attendance: 3,000; Referee: Elchin Mammadov

Gabala lost on away goals

== Squad statistics ==
=== Appearances and goals ===
As of 14 May 2012

No.	Pos	Nat	Player	Total		Premier League		Azerbaijan Cup	
No.	Pos	Nat	Player	Apps	Goals	Apps	Goals	Apps	Goals
1	GK	(Azerbaijan) AZE	Elnar Karimov	0	0	0+0	0	0+0	0
3	DF	(Azerbaijan) AZE	Vurğun Hüseynov	22	1	21+0	1	1+0	0
4	DF	(Azerbaijan) AZE	Mahir Shukurov	21	0	19+0	0	2+0	0
5	DF	(Azerbaijan) AZE	Sergei Sokolov	0	0	0+0	0	0+0	0
7	MF	(Azerbaijan) AZE	Yashar Abuzerov	11	0	2+8	0	0+1	0
8	MF	(Brazil) BRA	Bruno Barbosa	27	0	23+1	0	3+0	0
9	FW	(Senegal) SEN	Victor Mendy	30	9	23+4	8	3+0	1
10	FW	(Jamaica) JAM	Deon Burton	24	6	19+3	6	2+0	0
11	FW	(France) FRA	Yannick Kamanan	16	9	14+0	9	2+0	0
15	DF	(Azerbaijan) AZE	Nodar Mammadov	19	1	8+10	1	1+0	0
17	MF	(Azerbaijan) AZE	Arif Isayev	13	0	3+8	0	0+2	0
18	MF	(Azerbaijan) AZE	Aleksandr Chertoganov	31	2	25+3	2	3+0	0
19	MF	(Azerbaijan) AZE	Rovshan Amiraslanov	4	0	2+1	0	0+1	0
20	DF	(Netherlands) NED	Steve Olfers	26	0	24+0	0	2+0	0
21	MF	(Azerbaijan) AZE	Elmar Bakhshiev	9	0	4+5	0	0+0	0
22	FW	(Azerbaijan) AZE	Murad Hüseynov	15	1	2+12	1	0+1	0
24	MF	(Azerbaijan) AZE	Tarzin Jahangirov	5	0	3+2	0	0+0	0
25	MF	(Azerbaijan) AZE	Nuran Gurbanov	5	0	2+3	0	0+0	0
26	DF	(Brazil) BRA	Daniel Cruz	23	1	17+5	1	0+1	0
30	GK	(Scotland) SCO	Graeme Smith	8	0	7+0	0	1+0	0
34	DF	(Azerbaijan) AZE	Urfan Abbasov	14	0	11+1	0	2+0	0
77	FW	(Brazil) BRA	Dodô	34	10	31+0	9	3+0	1
	FW	(Azerbaijan) AZE	Elnur Mustafayev	1	0	0+1	0	0+0	0
	FW	(Azerbaijan) AZE	Amil Yunanov	1	1	0+1	1	0+0	0
	MF	(Azerbaijan) AZE	Seymur Äsädov	1	0	0+1	0	0+0	0
Players who appeared for Gabala no longer at the club:
6	DF	(Serbia) SRB	Ljubo Baranin	28	2	23+2	2	3+0	0
11	FW	(Ivory Coast) CIV	Serge Djiehoua	10	4	8+1	2	1+0	2
12	GK	(Latvia) LAT	Pāvels Doroševs	27	0	25+0	0	2+0	0
14	MF	(Serbia) SRB	Veseljko Trivunović	15	0	12+2	0	1+0	0
16	MF	(Guinea) GUI	Abdoul Kader Camara	10	0	7+3	0	0+0	0
33	DF	(Azerbaijan) AZE	Saşa Yunisoğlu	18	1	17+0	0	1+0	1

=== Goal scorers ===
Place	Position	Nation	Number	Name	Premier League	Azerbaijan Cup	Total
1	FW	(Brazil)	77	Dodo	9	1	10
2	FW	(France)	11	Yannick Kamanan	9	0	9
2	FW	(Senegal)	9	Victor Mendy	8	1	9
4	FW	(Jamaica)	10	Deon Burton	6	0	6
5	FW	(Ivory Coast)	11	Serge Djiehoua	2	2	4
6	MF	(Azerbaijan)	18	Aleksandr Chertoganov	2	0	2
6	DF	(Serbia)	6	Ljuba Baranin	2	0	2
8	DF	(Brazil)	26	Daniel Lopez Cruz	1	0	1
8	FW	(Azerbaijan)	22	Murad Hüseynov	1	0	1
8	DF	(Azerbaijan)	15	Nodar Mammadov	1	0	1
8	DF	(Azerbaijan)	3	Vurğun Hüseynov	1	0	1
8	FW	(Azerbaijan)		Amil Yunanov	1	0	1
8	DF	(Azerbaijan)	33	Saşa Yunisoğlu	0	1	1
				TOTALS	43	5	48

=== Disciplinary record ===
Number	Nation	Position	Name	Premier League		Azerbaijan Cup		Total	
Number	Nation	Position	Name	Yellow card	Red card	Yellow card	Red card	Yellow card	Red card
3	(Azerbaijan)	DF	Vurğun Hüseynov	5	0	0	0	5	0
4	(Azerbaijan)	DF	Mahir Shukurov	8	2	1	0	9	2
8	(Brazil)	MF	Bruno Barbosa	4	1	0	0	4	1
9	(Senegal)	FW	Victor Mendy	3	0	0	0	3	0
10	(Jamaica)	FW	Deon Burton	3	1	0	0	3	1
11	(France)	FW	Yannick Kamanan	2	0	0	0	2	0
15	(Azerbaijan)	DF	Nodar Mammadov	2	1	0	0	2	1
16	(Guinea)	MF	Abdoul Kader Camara	3	0	0	0	3	0
18	(Azerbaijan)	MF	Aleksandr Chertoganov	6	1	0	0	6	1
19	(Azerbaijan)	MF	Rovshan Amiraslanov	1	0	0	0	1	0
20	(Netherlands)	DF	Steve Olfers	2	0	0	0	2	0
22	(Azerbaijan)	FW	Murad Hüseynov	1	0	0	0	1	0
25	(Azerbaijan)	MF	Nuran Gurbanov	1	0	0	0	1	0
26	(Brazil)	DF	Daniel Cruz	6	0	0	0	6	0
30	(Scotland)	GK	Graeme Smi	2	0	0	0	2	0
33	(Azerbaijan)	DF	Saşa Yunisoğlu	5	0	0	0	5	0
34	(Azerbaijan)	DF	Urfan Abbasov	5	0	1	0	6	0
77	(Brazil)	FW	Dodo	7	0	0	0	7	0
Players who left Gabala during the season:
6	(Serbia)	DF	Ljuba Baranin	1	0	1	0	2	0
11	(Ivory Coast)	FW	Serge Djiehoua	3	0	0	0	3	0
12	(Latvia)	GK	Pāvels Doroševs	5	0	0	0	5	0
14	(Serbia)	MF	Veseljko Trivunović	2	0	0	0	2	0
			TOTALS	69	6	3	0	72	6

=== Awards ===
==== Player of the Month ====
MONTH	Name	Award
March	(France) Yannick Kamanan	Won

== Team kit ==
These are the 2011–12 Gabala F.C. kits. Supplier: Erreà
Sponsor(s): Hyundai

Gabala's Home Kit	Gabala's Away Kit
