= 2012–13 Gabala FC season =

Gabala
2012–13 season
- Chairman: Taleh Heydərov
- Manager: Fatih Kavlak until 24 September 2012; Ramiz Mammadov; 24 September 2012 – 2 April 2013; Luis Aragon (Caretaker); 2 April 2013 – 29 May 2013
- Stadium: Gabala City Stadium
- Premier League: 6th
- Azerbaijan Cup: Quarterfinals vs Qarabağ
- Top goalscorer: League: Two Players (6); All: Three Players (6)
- Highest home attendance: 2,500 vs Sumgayit; 25 August 2012
- Lowest home attendance: 200 vs Qaradağ; 28 November 2012
- Average home league attendance: 1,052
Home colours	Away colours

The Gabala FC 2012–13 season was Gabala's eighth season and seventh Azerbaijan Premier League season. They started the season under manager Fatih Kavlak, who was sacked on 24 September 2012 following a poor run of results and was replaced by Ramiz Mammadov. Mammadov was himself sacked on 2 April 2013 following 5 games without a win, with reserve team manager Luis Aragon taking over in a caretaker role. Gabala also competed in the Azerbaijan Cup, entering at the Last 16 stage and beating Qaradağ before being eliminated in the Quarterfinals by Qarabağ.

== Squad ==
As of match played 19 May 2013

No.	Name	Nationality	Position	Date of birth (age)	Signed from	Signed in	Contract ends	Apps.	Goals
Goalkeepers
1	Elnar Karimov	(Azerbaijan)	GK	5 April 1984 (aged 29)	Khazar Lankaran	2006	2013	18	0
25	Diego	(Brazil)	GK	11 May 1979 (aged 34)	Vitória	2012	2014	18	0
30	Anar Nazirov	(Azerbaijan)	GK	8 September 1985 (aged 27)	Turan Tovuz	2012	2013	21	0
Defenders
3	Vurğun Hüseynov	(Azerbaijan)	DF	25 April 1988 (aged 25)	Turan Tovuz	2011	2013	66	4
6	Nikola Valentić	(Serbia)	DF	6 September 1983 (aged 29)	Jagodina	2013	2014	10	0
8	Cristian Pulhac	(Romania)	DF	17 August 1984 (aged 28)	Dinamo București	2013	2015	12	0
15	Oumar Kalabane	(Guinea)	DF	1 August 1987 (aged 25)	Al Dhafra	2012	2014	29	2
16	Ifeanyi Emeghara	(Nigeria)	DF	24 March 1984 (aged 29)	Steaua București	2013	2014	4	0
23	Shahriyar Khalilov	(Azerbaijan)	DF	21 June 1991 (aged 21)	Khazar Lankaran	2012	2015	18	0
26	Daniel Cruz	(Brazil)	DF	6 January 1982 (aged 31)	Naval	2011	2013	37	1
34	Urfan Abbasov	(Azerbaijan)	DF	14 October 1992 (aged 20)	Qarabağ	2011		44	0
39	Sadig Guliyev	(Azerbaijan)	DF	9 March 1995 (aged 18)	Trainee	2012		1	0
45	Murad Musayev	(Azerbaijan)	DF	13 June 1994 (aged 18)	Trainee	2012		1	0
84	Dejan Kelhar	(Slovenia)	DF	5 April 1984 (aged 29)	Samsunspor	2012	2014	31	1
Midfielders
4	Amit Guluzade	(Azerbaijan)	MF	20 November 1992 (aged 20)	Ravan Baku	2013	2014	9	0
5	Luka Žinko	(Slovenia)	MF	23 March 1983 (aged 30)	Rudar Velenje	2013	2013	8	1
7	Yashar Abuzerov	(Azerbaijan)	MF	9 September 1977 (aged 35)	Olimpik Baku	2009	2013	62	2
13	Seymur Asadov	(Azerbaijan)	MF	5 May 1994 (aged 19)	Trainee	2011		1	0
19	Rovshan Amiraslanov	(Azerbaijan)	MF	18 March 1986 (aged 27)	Inter Baku	2011	2013	12	0
20	Rashid Amiraslanov	(Azerbaijan)	MF	4 May 1992 (aged 21)	Trainee	2012		1	0
21	Elmar Bakhshiev	(Azerbaijan)	MF	3 August 1980 (aged 32)	Neftchi Baku	2012		28	0
22	Lourival Assis	(Brazil)	MF	3 February 1984 (aged 29)	Chernomorets Burgas	2012	2015	30	6
27	Rashad Abdullayev	(Azerbaijan)	MF	1 October 1981 (aged 31)	Neftchi Baku	2012	2013	28	5
28	Mushfig Teymurov	(Azerbaijan)	MF	15 January 1993 (aged 20)	Karvan	2009		4	0
35	Tarzin Jahangirov	(Azerbaijan)	MF	17 January 1992 (aged 21)	Trainee	2010		19	0
37	Kamal Mirzayev	(Azerbaijan)	MF	14 September 1994 (aged 18)	Trainee	2012		5	0
90	Jeyhun Sultanov	(Azerbaijan)	MF	12 June 1979 (aged 33)	Sumgayit	2013	2013	5	0
Forwards
9	Victor Mendy	(Senegal)	FW	22 December 1981 (aged 31)	Bucaspor	2011	2013	56	15
10	Dodô	(Brazil)	FW	16 October 1987 (aged 25)	Lokomotiva	2011	2013	67	14
11	Yannick Kamanan	(France)	FW	5 October 1981 (aged 31)	Mersin İdmanyurdu SK	2012	2014	49	15
14	Moustapha Dabo	(Senegal)	FW	27 February 1986 (aged 27)	Spartaks Jūrmala	2013	2014	7	1
38	Rey Mammadbayli	(Azerbaijan)	FW	26 July 1992 (aged 20)	Trainee	2010		0	0
99	Amil Yunanov	(Azerbaijan)	FW	6 January 1993 (aged 20)	Trainee	2010		7	1
Away on loan
25	Nuran Qurbanov	(Azerbaijan)	MF	10 August 1993 (aged 19)	MOIK Baku	2011		10	0
Left during the season
5	Muammer Erdoğdu	(Turkey)	DF	7 July 1987 (aged 25)	Turan Tovuz	2012		2	0
8	Bruno Barbosa	(Brazil)	MF	15 February 1988 (aged 25)	São Paulo	2010		65	2
18	Aleksandr Chertoganov	(Azerbaijan)	MF	8 February 1980 (aged 32)	Inter Baku	2011		52	3
88	Nodar Mammadov (Note: Nodar Mammadov was born in Kaspi, Georgian SSR, but qualified to represent Azerbaijan, representing them at senior level between 2007 and 2008.)	(Azerbaijan)	DF	3 June 1988 (aged 23)	Qarabağ	2010		59	4

== Transfers ==
=== Summer ===
In: Note: Flags indicate national team as defined under FIFA eligibility rules; some limited exceptions apply. Players may hold more than one non-FIFA nationality.

No.	Pos.	Nation	Player
5	DF	TUR	Muammer Erdoğdu (from (Azerbaijan) Turan Tovuz)
15	DF	GUI	Oumar Kalabane (from (United Arab Emirates) Al Dhafra)
22	MF	BRA	Lourival Assis (from (Bulgaria) Chernomorets Burgas)
23	DF	AZE	Shahriyar Khalilov (from (Azerbaijan) Khazar Lankaran)
25	GK	BRA	Diego (from (Portugal) Vitória)
27	MF	AZE	Rashad Abdullayev (from (Azerbaijan) Neftchi Baku)
30	GK	AZE	Anar Nazirov (loan return from (Azerbaijan) Turan Tovuz)
84	DF	SLO	Dejan Kelhar (from (Turkey) Samsunspor)

Out: Note: Flags indicate national team as defined under FIFA eligibility rules; some limited exceptions apply. Players may hold more than one non-FIFA nationality.

No.	Pos.	Nation	Player
4	DF	AZE	Mahir Shukurov (to (Azerbaijan) Neftchi Baku)
5	DF	AZE	Sergey Sokolov (Retired)
10	FW	JAM	Deon Burton (to (England) Gillingham)
16	MF	GUI	Abdoul Kader Camara (to (Belgium) Verviétois joined in January 2013)
17	MF	AZE	Arif Isayev (to (Azerbaijan) AZAL)
20	DF	NED	Steve Olfers
22	FW	AZE	Murad Hüseynov (to (Azerbaijan) Sumgayit)
25	MF	AZE	Nuran Gurbanov (loan to (Azerbaijan) Ravan Baku)
30	GK	SCO	Graeme Smith (to (Scotland) Partick Thistle)
33	DF	AZE	Saşa Yunisoğlu (to (Azerbaijan) Neftchi Baku)

=== Winter ===
In: Note: Flags indicate national team as defined under FIFA eligibility rules; some limited exceptions apply. Players may hold more than one non-FIFA nationality.

No.	Pos.	Nation	Player
4	MF	AZE	Amit Guluzade (from (Azerbaijan) Ravan Baku)
5	MF	SLO	Luka Žinko (from (Slovenia) Rudar Velenje)
6	DF	SRB	Nikola Valentić (from (Serbia) Jagodina)
8	DF	ROU	Cristian Pulhac (from (Romania) Dinamo București)
14	FW	SEN	Moustapha Dabo (from (Latvia) Spartaks Jūrmala)
16	DF	NGR	Ifeanyi Emeghara (from (Romania) Steaua București)
90	MF	AZE	Jeyhun Sultanov (from (Azerbaijan) Sumgayit)
—	MF	ARG	Matías Córdoba (trial)

Out: Note: Flags indicate national team as defined under FIFA eligibility rules; some limited exceptions apply. Players may hold more than one non-FIFA nationality.

No.	Pos.	Nation	Player
5	DF	TUR	Muammer Erdoğdu (to (Turkey) Kartalspor)
8	MF	BRA	Bruno Barbosa (to (Brazil) Atlético Ibirama)
88	DF	AZE	Nodar Mammadov (to (Azerbaijan) Ravan Baku)

== Competitions ==
=== Friendlies ===
16 July 2012	Karvina (Czech Republic)	1–0	(Azerbaijan) Gabala	Slovenia
	Presl 22'	Summary

17 July 2012	Inđija (Serbia)	2–0	(Azerbaijan) Gabala	Slovenia
	12' (second half)	Summary

21 July 2012	Rad (Serbia)	2–1	(Azerbaijan) Gabala	Slovenia
21:00 C.E.T.	(second half) (second half)	Summary	Kelhar 55'

23 July 2012	BSK Borča (Serbia)	1–2	(Azerbaijan) Gabala	Slovenia
	Goal	Summary	Chertoganov 32'

26 July 2012	Mersin İdmanyurdu (Turkey)	0–2	(Azerbaijan) Gabala	Slovenia
		Summary

22 January 2013	Ingolstadt 04 (Germany)	4–3	(Azerbaijan) Gabala	Antalya, Turkey
12:00 AZT (UTC+4)	29'; 49' (2nd Half) (2nd Half)	Summary; Video on YouTube	Abdullayev 44'; 53' (o.g.); Kamanan

25 January 2013	Volyn Lutsk (Ukraine)	1–2	(Azerbaijan) Gabala	Antalya, Turkey
19:00 AZT (UTC+4)	(second half)	Summary; Report; Video on YouTube	Kamanan 13'; Mendy 62'

27 January 2013	Metalurh Zaporizhya (Ukraine)	1–1	(Azerbaijan) Gabala	Antalya, Turkey
16:00 AZT (UTC+4)	(2nd Half)	Summary; Video on YouTube	Sultanov 49'

28 January 2013	Petrolul Ploiești (Romania)	0–2	(Azerbaijan) Gabala	Antalya, Turkey
19:00 AZT (UTC+4)		Summary; Video on YouTube	Kamanan 7'; Abdullayev 80'

30 January 2013	Steaua București (Romania)	0–1	(Azerbaijan) Gabala	Antalya, Turkey
21:30 AZT (UTC+4)		[Summary] Video on YouTube	Dodo 78'

1 February 2013	Milsami (Moldova)	2–2	(Azerbaijan) Gabala	Antalya, Turkey
AZT (UTC+4)	Boghiu	[Summary] Video on YouTube	Khalilov 35'; Mendy 82'

=== Azerbaijan Premier League ===
==== Results summary ====
Overall								Home						Away					
Pld	W	D	L	GF	GA	GD	Pts	W	D	L	GF	GA	GD	W	D	L	GF	GA	GD
22	9	5	8	26	27	−1	32	5	2	4	13	10	+3	4	3	4	13	17	−4

Last updated: 3 March 2013.
Source: Soccerway

==== Results by round ====
Round	1	2	3	4	5	6	7	8	9	10	11	12	13	14	15	16	17	18	19	20	21	22
Ground	A	H	A	H	A	H	H	A	H	H	A	H	H	A	H	A	H	A	H	A	H	A
Result	D	W	L	W	L	L	D	D	D	L	W	W	W	W	L	W	L	W	D	L	W	L
Position	5	4	5	3	5	5	6	7	6	10	9	5	4	3	4	4	4	5	5	5	5	5

Source: Soccerway
A = Away; H = Home; W = Win; D = Draw; L = Loss

==== Results ====
4 August 2012 1	Simurq	1–1	Gabala	Zaqatala
19:00 AZST (UTC+5)	Qirtimov 66'	Summary	Kelhar 15'; Abbasov (yellow card) 31' (yellow-red card) 84'	Stadium: Zaqatala City Stadium; Attendance: 1,500; Referee: Elchin Mammadov

10 August 2012 2	Gabala	1–0	Inter Baku	Qabala
19:00 AZST (UTC+5)	Assis 13'	Summary		Stadium: Gabala City Stadium; Attendance: 2,000; Referee: Vusal Aliyev

18 August 2012 3	Neftchi Baku	3–0	Gabala	Baku
18:00 AZST (UTC+5)	Imamverdiyev 47', 87'; Wobay 56'	Summary		Stadium: Ismat Gayibov Stadium; Attendance: 800; Referee: Anar Salmanov

25 August 2012 4	Gabala	4–1	Sumgayit	Qabala
19:00 AZST (UTC+5)	Bruno 33'; Kalabane 53', 71'; Abdullayev 55'	Summary	Gurbanov 18'	Stadium: Gabala City Stadium; Attendance: 2,500; Referee: Orkhan Mammadov

14 September 2012 5	Kəpəz	1–0	Gabala	Ganja
17:00 AZST (UTC+5)	Soltanov 41'	Summary		Stadium: Ganja City Stadium; Attendance: 4,000; Referee: Elchin Mämmädov

24 September 2012 6	Gabala	1–3	Ravan Baku	Qabala
17:00 AZST (UTC+5)	Chertoganov 37'; Chertoganov (yellow card) 72' (yellow-red card) 72'	Summary	Varea 23'; Torres 64'; Gurbanov 90+1'	Stadium: Gabala City Stadium; Attendance: 1,200; Referee: Rahim Hasanov

29 September 2012 7	Gabala	0–0	AZAL	Qabala
16:00 AZST (UTC+5)		Summary		Stadium: Gabala City Stadium; Attendance: 500; Referee: Fariz Yusifov

4 October 2012 8	Baku	1–1	Gabala	Baku
16:00 AZST (UTC+5)	Šolić 59'	Summary	Mendy 14'; Amiraslanov (yellow card) 40' (yellow-red card) 43'	Stadium: Tofig Bakhramov Stadium; Attendance: 500; Referee: Anar Salmanov

20 October 2012 9	Khazar Lankaran	1–1	Gabala	Lankaran
17:15 AZST (UTC+5)	Alviž 76' (pen.)	Summary	Kamanan 22'	Stadium: Lankaran City Stadium; Attendance: 6,000; Referee: Rauf Jabbarov

26 October 2012 10	Gabala	0–1	Turan Tovuz	Qabala
16:00 AZST (UTC+5)		Summary	Rukavina 57'	Stadium: Gabala City Stadium; Attendance: 500; Referee: Anar Salmanov

31 October 2012 11	Qarabağ	1–2	Gabala	Baku^{1}
15:00 AZT (UTC+4)	Muarem 59'	Summary	Abdullayev 32'; Dodô 34'	Stadium: Tofiq Bahramov Stadium; Attendance: 500; Referee: Vusal Aliyev

3 November 2012 12	Gabala	2–1	Neftchi Baku	Qabala
15:00 AZT (UTC+4)	Assis 31'; Dodô 88'	Summary	Canales 32'	Stadium: Gabala City Stadium; Attendance: 1,100; Referee: Fariz Yusifov

19 November 2012 13	Gabala	2–0	Kəpəz	Qabala
14:00 AZT (UTC+4)	Mendy 61'; Abdullayev 66' (pen.)	Summary		Stadium: Gabala City Stadium; Attendance: 1,080; Referee: Rahim Hasanov

25 November 2012 14	Ravan Baku	1–3	Gabala	Baku
18:00 AZT (UTC+4)	T.Mikayilov 24'; E.Hodžić (red card) 70'	Summary	Mendy 13'; Abdullayev 36'; Abdullayev (red card) 44'; Assis 71' (pen.)	Stadium: Bayil Stadium; Attendance: 1,000; Referee: Fariz Yusifov

2 December 2012 15	Gabala	0–2	Baku	Qabala
14:00 AZT (UTC+4)		Summary	Juninho 53'; Novruzov 83'	Stadium: Gabala City Stadium; Attendance: 1,500; Referee: Anar Salmanov

8 December 2012 16	Sumgayit	0–1	Gabala	Baku
14:00 AZT (UTC+4)		Summary	Mendy 39'; Chertoganov (red card) 61'	Stadium: Bayil Stadium; Attendance: 200; Referee: Elchin Mamedov

16 December 2012 17	Gabala	0–1	Simurq	Qabala
14:00 AZT (UTC+4)		Summary	Božić 77'; Pietrzkiewicz (yellow card) 90+3' (yellow-red card) 90+4'	Stadium: Gabala City Stadium; Attendance: 500; Referee: Vusal Aliyev

20 December 2012 18	Turan Tovuz	0–2	Gabala	Tovuz
14:00 AZT (UTC+4)		Summary	Abdullayev 76' (pen.); Dodô 88'	Stadium: Tovuz City Stadium; Attendance: 1,500; Referee: Fariz Yusifov

10 February 2012 19	Gabala	1–1	Qarabağ	Qabala
15:30 AZT (UTC+4)	Žinko 41'	Summary	Richard 54' (pen.)	Stadium: Gabala City Stadium; Attendance: 1,200; Referee: Vusal Aliyev

16 February 2012 20	Inter Baku	2–1	Gabala	Baku
15:00 AZT (UTC+4)	Dashdemirov 6'; Zargarov 73'	Summary	Kamanan 23'	Stadium: Shafa Stadium; Attendance: 1,000; Referee: Anar Salmanov

22 February 2012 21	Gabala	2–0	Khazar Lankaran	Qabala
15:00 AZT (UTC+4)	Kamanan 1', 87'	Summary	Vanderson (red card) 89'	Stadium: Gabala City Stadium; Attendance: 1,700; Referee: Fariz Yusifov

3 March 2012 22	AZAL	6–1	Gabala	Baku
15:00 AZT (UTC+4)	Igbekoi 19'; Tagiyev 47', 64'; Arsenijević 75'; Benouahi 80'; John 89'	Summary	Dabo 14'; Hüseynov (yellow card) 64' (yellow-red card) 83'	Stadium: AZAL Stadium; Attendance: 500; Referee: Rahim Häsänov

==== League table ====
Pos	Team	Pld	W	D	L	GF	GA	GD	Pts	Qualification
3	Qarabağ	22	10	9	3	30	19	+11	39	Qualification for championship group
4	Simurq	22	9	9	4	25	15	+10	36	Qualification for championship group
5	Gabala	22	9	5	8	26	27	−1	32	Qualification for championship group
6	Baku	22	6	12	4	24	15	+9	30	Qualification for championship group
7	AZAL	22	7	8	7	32	25	+7	29	Qualification for relegation group

Source: Association of Football Federations of Azerbaijan and Soccerway.com
Rules for classification: 1) points; 2) goal difference; 3) number of goals scored.

=== Azerbaijan Premier League Championship Group ===
==== Results summary ====
Overall								Home						Away					
Pld	W	D	L	GF	GA	GD	Pts	W	D	L	GF	GA	GD	W	D	L	GF	GA	GD
10	1	3	6	6	13	−7	6	0	3	2	4	7	−3	1	0	4	2	6	−4

Last updated: 19 May 2013.
Source: Soccerway

==== Results by round ====
Round	1	2	3	4	5	6	7	8	9	10
Ground	H	A	H	H	A	H	A	A	H	A
Result	L	L	D	D	L	L	L	W	D	L
Position	5	6	6	6	6	6	6	6	6	6

Updated to match(es) played on 19 May 2013. Source: Soccerway
A = Away; H = Home; W = Win; D = Draw; L = Loss

==== Results ====
13 March 2013 23	Gabala	1–2	Inter Baku	Qabala
15:00 AZT (UTC+4)	Mendy 62'	Summary	Mammadov 26'; Fomenko 29'	Stadium: Gabala City Stadium; Attendance: 1,500; Referee: Vusal Aliyev

30 March 2013 24	Qarabağ	1–0	Gabala	Baku^{1}
15:00 AZT (UTC+4)	Richard 39'	Summary		Stadium: Tofiq Bahramov Stadium; Attendance: 0 Referee: Fariz Yusifov

5 April 2013 25	Gabala	1–1	Simurq	Qabala
16:00 AZST (UTC+5)	Assis 54'	Summary	Bušić 90'	Stadium: Gabala City Stadium; Attendance: 550; Referee: Orkhan Mämmädov

13 April 2013 26	Gabala	1–1	Baku	Qabala
15:00 AZST (UTC+5)	Mendy 30'	Summary	Aliyev 90+1' (pen.)	Stadium: Gabala City Stadium; Attendance: 750; Referee: Anar Salmanov

21 April 2013 27	Neftchi Baku	2–1	Gabala	Baku
18:00 AZST (UTC+5)	Silva 53'; Flavinho (yellow card) 63' (yellow-red card) 66'; Canales 69'	Summary	Assis 15'; Chertoganov (yellow card) 37' (yellow-red card) 65'	Stadium: Bakcell Arena; Attendance: 1,000; Referee: Aliyar Aghayev

28 April 2013 28	Gabala	0–2	Qarabağ	Qabala
16:00 AZST (UTC+5)		Summary	Reynaldo 67', 76'	Stadium: Gabala City Stadium; Attendance: 1,000; Referee: Aliyar Aghayev

3 May 2013 29	Simurq	2–0	Gabala	Zaqatala
18:00 AZST (UTC+5)	Gurbanov 54', 68'	Summary		Stadium: Zaqatala City Stadium; Attendance: 1,000; Referee: Vusal Aliyev

9 May 2013 30	Baku	0–1	Gabala	Baku
17:00 AZST (UTC+5)		Summary	Assis 65'	Stadium: Tofig Bakhramov Stadium; Attendance: 1,000; Referee: Rahim Häsänov

14 May 2013 31	Gabala	1–1	Neftchi Baku	Qabala
17:30 AZST (UTC+5)	Kamanan 72'	Summary	Sadiqov 14'	Stadium: Gabala City Stadium; Attendance: 2,000; Referee: Fariz Yusifov

19 May 2013 32	Inter Baku	1–0	Gabala	Baku
16:00 AZST (UTC+5)	Mansurov 87'	Summary		Stadium: Shafa Stadium; Attendance: 1,500; Referee: Aliyar Aghayev

==== Table ====
Pos	Team	Pld	W	D	L	GF	GA	GD	Pts	Qualification
2	Qarabağ	32	16	11	5	43	26	+17	59	Qualification for Europa League first qualifying round
3	Inter Baku	32	16	9	7	38	22	+16	57	Qualification for Europa League first qualifying round
4	Simurq	32	12	12	8	32	26	+6	48	
5	Baku	32	9	14	9	33	27	+6	41	
6	Gabala	32	10	8	14	32	40	−8	38	

Source: Soccerway.com
Rules for classification: 1) points; 2) goal difference; 3) number of goals scored.

=== Azerbaijan Cup ===
28 November 2012 Second Round	Gabala	2–0	Qaradağ	Qabala
13:30 AZT (UTC+4)	Kamanan 48'; Erdoğdu 59'	Summary		Stadium: Gabala City Stadium; Attendance: 200; Referee: Elvin Asgarov

27 February 2013 Quarterfinals 1st Leg	Gabala	1–1	Qarabağ	Qabala
15:00 AZT (UTC+4)	Dodô 33'	Summary	Nadirov 56'	Stadium: Gabala City Stadium; Attendance: 1,150; Referee: Aliyar Aghayev

7 March 2013 Quarterfinals 2nd Leg	Qarabağ	0–0 (a 1 – 1 agg.)	Gabala	Baku^{1}
18:00 AZT (UTC+4)		Summary		Stadium: Tofiq Bahramov Stadium; Attendance: 700; Referee: Fariz Yusifov

== Squad statistics ==
As of 19 May 2013

=== Appearances and goals ===
No.	Pos	Nat	Player	Total		Premier League		Azerbaijan Cup	
No.	Pos	Nat	Player	Apps	Goals	Apps	Goals	Apps	Goals
1	GK	(Azerbaijan) AZE	Elnar Karimov	0	0	0+0	0	0+0	0
3	DF	(Azerbaijan) AZE	Vurğun Hüseynov	7	0	3+4	0	0+0	0
4	MF	(Azerbaijan) AZE	Amit Guluzade	9	0	7+0	0	2+0	0
5	MF	(Slovenia) SLO	Luka Žinko	8	1	3+5	1	0+0	0
6	DF	(Serbia) SRB	Nikola Valentić	10	0	9+1	0	0+0	0
7	MF	(Azerbaijan) AZE	Yashar Abuzerov	11	0	0+10	0	0+1	0
8	DF	(Romania) ROU	Cristian Pulhac	12	0	9+1	0	1+1	0
9	FW	(Senegal) SEN	Victor Mendy	26	6	15+9	6	1+1	0
10	FW	(Brazil) BRA	Dodô	33	4	28+2	3	3+0	1
11	FW	(France) FRA	Yannick Kamanan	33	6	23+7	5	3+0	1
14	FW	(Senegal) SEN	Moustapha Dabo	8	1	6+1	1	0+1	0
15	DF	(Guinea) GUI	Oumar Kalabane	29	2	27+0	2	2+0	0
16	DF	(Nigeria) NGR	Ifeanyi Emeghara	4	0	2+2	0	0+0	0
19	MF	(Azerbaijan) AZE	Rovshan Amiraslanov	9	0	4+4	0	1+0	0
20	MF	(Azerbaijan) AZE	Rashid Amiraslanov	1	0	0+1	0	0+0	0
21	MF	(Azerbaijan) AZE	Elmar Bakhshiev	19	0	15+4	0	0+0	0
22	MF	(Brazil) BRA	Lourival Assis	30	6	20+7	6	2+1	0
23	DF	(Azerbaijan) AZE	Shahriyar Khalilov	18	0	7+8	0	1+2	0
25	GK	(Brazil) BRA	Diego	18	0	16+0	0	2+0	0
26	DF	(Brazil) BRA	Daniel Cruz	14	0	12+1	0	1+0	0
27	MF	(Azerbaijan) AZE	Rashad Abdullayev	28	5	25+0	5	2+1	0
28	MF	(Azerbaijan) AZE	Mushfig Teymurov	4	0	1+2	0	0+1	0
30	GK	(Azerbaijan) AZE	Anar Nazirov	17	0	16+0	0	1+0	0
34	DF	(Azerbaijan) AZE	Urfan Abbasov	30	0	25+3	0	2+0	0
35	MF	(Azerbaijan) AZE	Tarzin Jahangirov	8	0	6+1	0	1+0	0
37	MF	(Azerbaijan) AZE	Kamal Mirzayev	5	0	5+0	0	0+0	0
39	DF	(Azerbaijan) AZE	Sadig Guliyev	1	0	1+0	0	0+0	0
45	DF	(Azerbaijan) AZE	Murad Musayev	1	0	1+0	0	0+0	0
84	DF	(Slovenia) SLO	Dejan Kelhar	31	1	28+0	1	3+0	0
90	MF	(Azerbaijan) AZE	Jeyhun Sultanov	5	0	0+3	0	2+0	0
99	FW	(Azerbaijan) AZE	Amil Yunanov	5	0	0+5	0	0+0	0
	MF	(Azerbaijan) AZE	Seymur Äsädov	0	0	0+0	0	0+0	0
	FW	(Azerbaijan) AZE	Elnur Mustafayev	0	0	0+0	0	0+0	0
Players who appeared for Gabala no longer at the club:
5	DF	(Turkey) TUR	Muammer Erdoğdu	2	1	0+1	0	1+0	1
8	MF	(Brazil) BRA	Bruno Barbosa	18	1	13+4	1	1+0	0
18	MF	(Azerbaijan) AZE	Aleksandr Chertoganov	21	1	19+2	1	0+0	0
88	DF	(Azerbaijan) AZE	Nodar Mammadov	10	0	6+3	0	1+0	0

=== Goal scorers ===
Place	Position	Nation	Number	Name	Premier League	Azerbaijan Cup	Total
1	FW	(Senegal)	9	Victor Mendy	6	0	6
1	MF	(Brazil)	22	Lourival Assis	6	0	6
1	FW	(France)	11	Yannick Kamanan	5	1	6
4	MF	(Azerbaijan)	27	Rashad Abdullayev	5	0	5
5	FW	(Brazil)	10	Dodô	3	1	4
6	DF	(Guinea)	15	Oumar Kalabane	2	0	2
7	DF	(Slovenia)	84	Dejan Kelhar	1	0	1
7	MF	(Brazil)	8	Bruno Barbosa	1	0	1
7	MF	(Azerbaijan)	18	Aleksandr Chertoganov	1	0	1
7	MF	(Slovenia)	5	Luka Žinko	1	0	1
7	FW	(Senegal)	14	Moustapha Dabo	1	0	1
7	DF	(Turkey)	5	Muammer Erdoğdu	0	1	1
				TOTALS	32	3	35

=== Disciplinary record ===
Number	Nation	Position	Name	Premier League		Azerbaijan Cup		Total	
Number	Nation	Position	Name	Yellow card	Red card	Yellow card	Red card	Yellow card	Red card
3	(Azerbaijan)	DF	Vurğun Hüseynov	4	1	0	0	4	1
4	(Azerbaijan)	MF	Amit Guluzade	1	0	0	0	1	0
5	(Slovenia)	MF	Luka Žinko	2	0	0	0	2	0
6	(Serbia)	DF	Nikola Valentić	2	0	0	0	2	0
7	(Azerbaijan)	MF	Yashar Abuzerov	1	0	0	0	1	0
8	(Romania)	DF	Cristian Pulhac	1	0	0	0	1	0
9	(Senegal)	FW	Victor Mendy	2	0	0	0	2	0
10	(Brazil)	FW	Dodô	7	0	0	0	7	0
11	(France)	FW	Yannick Kamanan	3	0	0	0	3	0
15	(Guinea)	DF	Oumar Kalabane	6	0	0	0	6	0
16	(Nigeria)	DF	Ifeanyi Emeghara	1	0	0	0	1	0
18	(Azerbaijan)	MF	Aleksandr Chertoganov	9	3	0	0	9	3
19	(Azerbaijan)	MF	Rovshan Amiraslanov	2	1	0	0	2	1
21	(Azerbaijan)	MF	Elmar Bakhshiev	7	0	0	0	7	0
22	(Brazil)	MF	Lourival Assis	3	0	1	0	4	0
23	(Azerbaijan)	DF	Shahriyar Khalilov	3	0	1	0	4	0
25	(Brazil)	GK	Diego	4	0	0	0	4	0
26	(Brazil)	DF	Daniel Cruz	6	0	0	0	6	0
27	(Azerbaijan)	MF	Rashad Abdullayev	4	1	0	0	4	1
30	(Azerbaijan)	GK	Anar Nazirov	1	0	0	0	1	0
34	(Azerbaijan)	DF	Urfan Abbasov	10	1	0	0	10	1
37	(Azerbaijan)	MF	Kamal Mirzayev	2	0	0	0	2	0
84	(Slovenia)	DF	Dejan Kelhar	1	0	2	0	3	0
90	(Azerbaijan)	MF	Jeyhun Sultanov	1	0	0	0	1	0
Players who left Gabala during the season:
88	(Azerbaijan)	DF	Nodar Mammadov	1	0	0	0	1	0
			TOTALS	84	7	3	0	87	7

== Team kit ==
Supplier: Erreà
Sponsor(s): Hyundai

Gabala's Home Kit	Gabala's Away Kit

These are the 2012–13 Gabala F.C. kits.

== Notes ==
- Qarabağ have played their home games at the Tofiq Bahramov Stadium since 1993 due to the ongoing situation in Quzanlı.
