= 2011–12 Azerbaijan Cup =

2011-12 Azerbaijan Cup
Tournament details
- Country: Azerbaijan
- Teams: 21

Final positions
- Champions: Baku
- Runners-up: Neftchi Baku
- UEFA Europa League: Baku

Tournament statistics
- Matches played: 26
- Goals scored: 60 (2.31 per match)
- Top goal scorer: Juninho (3)

The Azerbaijan Cup 2011–12 is the 20th season of the annual cup competition in Azerbaijan. It started on 26 October 2011 with five games of the Premiliary Round and ended in May 2012 with the final. FC Inter Baku were the defending champions. Twenty-two teams were scheduled to compete in the competition.

The winner of the competition will qualify for the first qualifying round of the 2012–13 UEFA Europa League.

== Preliminary round ==
The games were played on 26 October 2011.

Team 1	Score	Team 2
Şahdag Qusar	4–1	Muğan
Taraggi	0–1	Neftchala
Şuşa	2–3	Qaradağ
Bakili	1–1 (ET 2–1)	Karvan
Lokomotiv-Bilajary	0–2	Sumgayit

== First round ==
The five winners from the preliminary round joined the remaining eleven teams of the 2011–12 Azerbaijan Premier League in this round and played against each other over one game. The games were played on 30 November 2011.

Team 1	Score	Team 2
Baku	0–0 (p. 3–2)	Ravan
Inter Baku	2–0^{1}	Turan
Simurq	0–1	Neftchi Baku
AZAL	2–0	Shahdag
Gabala	3–0	Neftchala
Qarabağ	3–0	Sumgayit
Khazar Lankaran	3–0	Qaradağ
Kapaz	2–0	Bakili

Notes

- Match Abandoned after Turan refused to restart the game after conceding a disputed goal

== Quarterfinals ==
The eight winners from the first round were drawn into four two-legged ties.

Team 1	Agg.	Team 2	1st leg	2nd leg
Baku	5−2	AZAL	3−1	2−1
Gabala	2−2 (a)	Qarabağ	2−2	0−0
Inter Baku	4–3	Khazar Lankaran	3−2	1−1
Kapaz	2−3	Neftchi Baku	1−2	1−1

== Semifinals ==
The four quarterfinal winners were drawn into two two-legged semifinal ties.

Team 1	Agg.	Team 2	1st leg	2nd leg
Baku	1−1 (5–4 p.)	Qarabağ	0−1	1−0 (a.e.t.)
Inter Baku	0−1	Neftchi Baku	0−0	0−1

== Final ==
The two semifinals winners participated in this stage of the competition.

17 May 2012
20:00 AZST

Baku	2−0	Neftchi Baku
Koke 8'; Juninho 27'	Summary	Denis Silva (yellow card) 60' (yellow-red card) 82'

Dalga Arena
Attendance: 4,300
Referee: Aliyar Ağayev

== Scorers ==
3 goals:

- (Brazil) Juninho, Baku

2 goals:

- (Spain) Koke, Baku
- (Ivory Coast) Serge Djiehoua, Gabala
- (Ukraine) Yuriy Fomenko, Kəpəz
- (Azerbaijan) Ceyhun Sultanov, Kəpəz
- (Costa Rica) Randall Brenes, Khazar Lankaran
- (Romania) Cătălin Doman, Khazar Lankaran
- (Uzbekistan) Bahodir Nasimov, Neftchi Baku
- (Azerbaijan) F. Amirguliyev, Şahdag Qusar
- (Azerbaijan) Royal Najafov, Şuşa

1 goal:

- (Romania) Gheorghe Boghiu, AZAL
- (Russia) Nugzar Kvirtiya, AZAL
- (Azerbaijan) Shahriyar Rahimov, AZAL
- (Azerbaijan) Orkhan Safiyaroglu, AZAL
- (Azerbaijan) Nasibov, Bakili Baku
- (Azerbaijan) Huseynov, Bakili Baku
- (Lithuania) Deividas Česnauskis, Baku
- (Slovenia) Lucas Mario Horvat, Baku
- (Croatia) Aleksandar Šolić, Baku
- (Azerbaijan) Saşa Yunisoğlu, Gabala
- (Brazil) Dodo, Gabala
- (Senegal) Victor Mendy, Gabala
- (Azerbaijan) Nizami Hajiyev, Inter Baku
- (Latvia) Ģirts Karlsons, Inter Baku
- (Bulgaria) Enyo Krastovchev, Inter Baku
- (Azerbaijan) Asif Mirili, Inter Baku
- (Georgia (country)) Bachana Tskhadadze, Inter Baku
- (Azerbaijan) Samir Zargarov, Inter Baku
- (Azerbaijan) Hashimov, Karvan
- (Azerbaijan) Elnur Abdullayev, Khazar Lankaran
- (Azerbaijan) Branimir Subašić, Khazar Lankaran
- (Azerbaijan) Aliyev, Mughan
- (Azerbaijan) Rashad Abdullayev, Neftchi Baku
- (Brazil) Alessandro, Neftchi Baku
- (Azerbaijan) Javid Imamverdiyev, Neftchi Baku
- (Azerbaijan) Amrahov, Neftchala
- (Georgia (country)) Giorgi Adamia, Qarabağ
- (Azerbaijan) Rauf Aliyev, Qarabağ
- (Azerbaijan) Afran Ismayilov, Qarabağ
- (North Macedonia) Muarem Muarem, Qarabağ
- (Brazil) Leonardo Rocha, Qarabağ
- (Azerbaijan) Bakhtiyar Soltanov, Qarabağ
- (Azerbaijan) Gadimov, Qaradağ
- (Azerbaijan) Tagiyev, Qaradağ
- (Azerbaijan) Alakberov, Qaradağ
- (Azerbaijan) Tayibov, Shahdag Qusar
- (Azerbaijan) Samir Abdulov, Sumgayit
- (Azerbaijan) Kamil Nurahmadov, Sumgayit
