= Ürfan Abbasov =

Azerbaijani footballer (born 1992)

Personal information
- Full name: Ürfan Ağamehdi oğlu Abbasov
- Date of birth: 14 October 1992 (age 34)
- Place of birth: Baku, Azerbaijan
- Height: 1.77 m (5 ft 10 in)
- Position: Left back

Team information
- Current team: Araz-Naxçıvan
- Number: 34

Youth career
- –2011: Qarabağ

Senior career*
Years	Team	Apps	(Gls)
2011–2019	Gabala	177	(3)
2019–2021	Sabail	47	(2)
2021–2024	Gabala	71	(2)
2024–	Araz-Naxçıvan	57	(1)

International career^{‡}
2012–2014	Azerbaijan U21	7	(0)
2015–	Azerbaijan	8	(1)
- * Club domestic league appearances and goals as of 22 June 2026 ‡ National team caps and goals as of 20:06, 24 December 2020 (UTC)

Ürfan Ağamehdi oğlu Abbasov (born 14 October 1992) is an Azerbaijani professional footballer who plays as a left back for Araz-Naxçıvan in the Azerbaijan Premier League, and the Azerbaijan national team.

== Career ==
=== Club ===
On 4 June 2019, Abbasov left Gabala FK by mutual consent, after playing 220 games for the club, signing for Sabail FK.

On 9 June 2021, Abbasov returned to Gabala, signing a one-year contract. On 6 June 2023, Abbasov extended his contract with Gabala for an additional two-years.

On 29 May 2024, Araz-Naxçıvan announced the signing of Abbasov to a one-year contract for the 2024–25 season.

=== International ===
On 10 November 2015 Abbasov was called up to the Azerbaijan national team for their game against Moldova, during which he made his debut coming on as a 69th-minute substitute for Pavlo Pashayev.

Abbasov scored his first goal for Azerbaijan on 29 May 2018, in a 3–0 win in a friendly against Kyrgyzstan.

== Career statistics ==
=== Club ===
As of match played 25 May 2024

Appearances and goals by club, season and competition
Club	Season	League			National Cup		Continental		Total	
Club	Season	Division	Apps	Goals	Apps	Goals	Apps	Goals	Apps	Goals
Gabala	2011–12	Azerbaijan Premier League	12	0	2	0	-		14	0
Gabala	2012–13	Azerbaijan Premier League	28	0	2	0	-		30	0
Gabala	2013–14	Azerbaijan Premier League	21	1	2	0	-		23	1
Gabala	2014–15	Azerbaijan Premier League	25	1	3	0	1	0	29	1
Gabala	2015–16	Azerbaijan Premier League	21	0	3	0	6	0	30	0
Gabala	2016–17	Azerbaijan Premier League	20	0	5	0	5	0	30	0
Gabala	2017–18	Azerbaijan Premier League	25	0	5	0	1	0	31	0
Gabala	2018–19	Azerbaijan Premier League	25	1	5	0	2	0	32	1
Gabala	Total		177	3	28	0	15	0	220	3
Sabail	2019–20	Azerbaijan Premier League	20	0	2	0	2	0	24	0
Sabail	2020–21	Azerbaijan Premier League	27	2	2	0	-		29	2
Sabail	Total		47	2	4	0	2	0	53	2
Gabala	2021–22	Azerbaijan Premier League	26	1	2	0	-		28	1
Gabala	2022–23	Azerbaijan Premier League	14	0	5	0	0	0	19	0
Gabala	2023–24	Azerbaijan Premier League	31	1	5	1	2	0	38	2
Gabala	Total		71	2	12	1	2	0	85	3
Career total			297	7	44	1	19	0	360	8

=== International ===
Azerbaijan
Year	Apps	Goals
2015	1	0
2016	0	0
2017	1	0
2018	6	1
Total	8	1

Statistics accurate as of match played 10 September 2018

=== International goals ===
Scores and results list Azerbaijan's goal tally first.
As of match played 29 May 2018

#	Date	Venue	Opponent	Score	Result	Competition	Ref.
1.	29 May 2018	Baku Olympic Stadium, Baku, Azerbaijan	Kyrgyzstan	3–0	3–0	Friendly	

== Honours ==
Gabala

- Azerbaijan Cup: 2018–19
