= Anar Nazirov =

Azerbaijani footballer (born 1985)

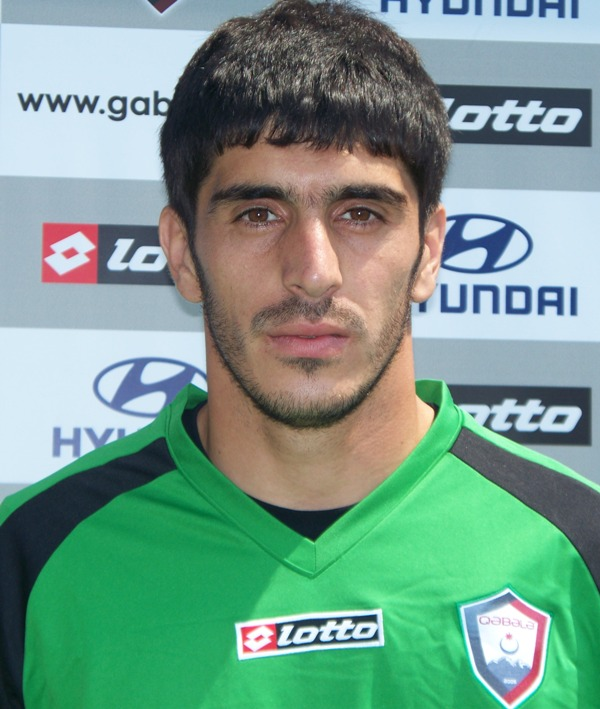

Personal information
- Full name: Anar Ramiz oğlu Nəzirov
- Date of birth: 8 September 1985 (age 41)
- Place of birth: Qakh, Azerbaijan SSR
- Height: 1.87 m (6 ft 2 in)
- Position: Goalkeeper

Team information
- Current team: Zira
- Number: 41

Senior career*
Years	Team	Apps	(Gls)
2005–2006	Kapaz	2	(0)
2006–2009	Neftchi Baku	6	(0)
2007–2008	→ Turan Tovuz (loan)	43	(0)
2009–2010	Standard Sumgayit	19	(0)
2010–2013	Gabala	20	(0)
2011–2012	→ Turan Tovuz (loan)	26	(0)
2013–2014	Sumgayit	17	(0)
2014–2015	Gabala	4	(0)
2015–2019	Zira	83	(0)
2019–2021	Gabala	41	(0)
2021–	Zira	25	(0)

International career^{‡}
2012–2016	Azerbaijan	4	(0)
- * Club domestic league appearances and goals as of 27 June 2025 ‡ National team caps and goals as of 3 June 2016

Anar Nazirov (Azerbaijani: Anar Nəzirov; born 8 September 1985) is an Azerbaijani professional footballer who plays as a goalkeeper for Zira.

== Career ==
On 6 June 2013 he was released from his contract with Gabala. Nazirov then signed with fellow Azerbaijan Premier League side Sumgayit. On 13 January 2014, after six months with Sumgayit, Nazirov re-signed for Gabala on a one-year contract. In July 2015 Nazirov moved to newly promoted Zira FK, on a one-year contract.

On 11 May 2017, Nazirov signed a new contract with Zira.

On 6 January 2019, Nazirov returned to Gabala FK for a third spell with the club, signing on a 18-month contract from Zira.

== Statistics ==
=== Club ===
As of match played 25 April 2021

Appearances and goals by club, season and competition
Club	Season	League			National Cup		Continental		Other		Total	
Club	Season	Division	Apps	Goals	Apps	Goals	Apps	Goals	Apps	Goals	Apps	Goals
Ganja	2005–06	Azerbaijan Top League	2	0			–		–		2	0
Neftchi Baku	2006–07	Azerbaijan Top League	3	0			–		–		3	0
Neftchi Baku	2007–08	Azerbaijan Top League	0	0			–		–		0	0
Neftchi Baku	2008–09	Azerbaijan Top League	3	0			–		–		3	0
Neftchi Baku	Total		6	0			-	-	-	-	6	0
Turan-Tovuz (loan)	2006–07	Azerbaijan Top League	10	0			–		–		10	0
Turan-Tovuz (loan)	2007–08	Azerbaijan Top League	26	0			–		–		26	0
Turan-Tovuz (loan)	2008–09	Azerbaijan Top League	7	0			–		–		7	0
Turan-Tovuz (loan)	Total		43	0			-	-	-	-	43	0
Standard Sumgayit	2009–10	Azerbaijan Premier League	19	0	1	0	–		–		20	0
Gabala	2010–11	Azerbaijan Premier League	5	0	0	0	–		–		5	0
Gabala	2011–12	Azerbaijan Premier League	0	0	0	0	–		–		0	0
Gabala	2012–13	Azerbaijan Premier League	16	0	1	0	–		–		0	0
Gabala	Total		21	0	1	0	-	-	-	-	22	0
Turan-Tovuz (loan)	2011–12	Azerbaijan Premier League	26	0	0	0	–		–		26	0
Sumgayit	2013–14	Azerbaijan Premier League	17	0	0	0	–		–		17	0
Gabala	2013–14	Azerbaijan Premier League	1	0	1	0	–		–		2	0
Gabala	2014–15	Azerbaijan Premier League	3	0	1	0	0	0	–		4	0
Gabala	Total		4	0	2	0	0	0	-	-	6	0
Zira	2015–16	Azerbaijan Premier League	30	0	0	0	–		–		30	0
Zira	2016–17	Azerbaijan Premier League	23	0	1	0	–		–		24	0
Zira	2017–18	Azerbaijan Premier League	16	0	0	0	4	0	–		20	0
Zira	2018–19	Azerbaijan Premier League	14	0	0	0	–		–		14	0
Zira	Total		83	0	1	0	4	0	-	-	88	0
Gabala	2018–19	Azerbaijan Premier League	4	0	3	0	0	0	–		7	0
Gabala	2019–20	Azerbaijan Premier League	15	0	2	0	2	0	–		19	0
Gabala	2020–21	Azerbaijan Premier League	22	0	2	0	–		–		24	0
Gabala	Total		41	0	7	0	2	0	-	-	50	0
Career total			262	0	12	0	6	0	-	-	280	0

== Honours ==
Gabala

- Azerbaijan Cup: 2018–19
