= Dodô (footballer, born October 1987) =

Brazilian footballer (born 1987)

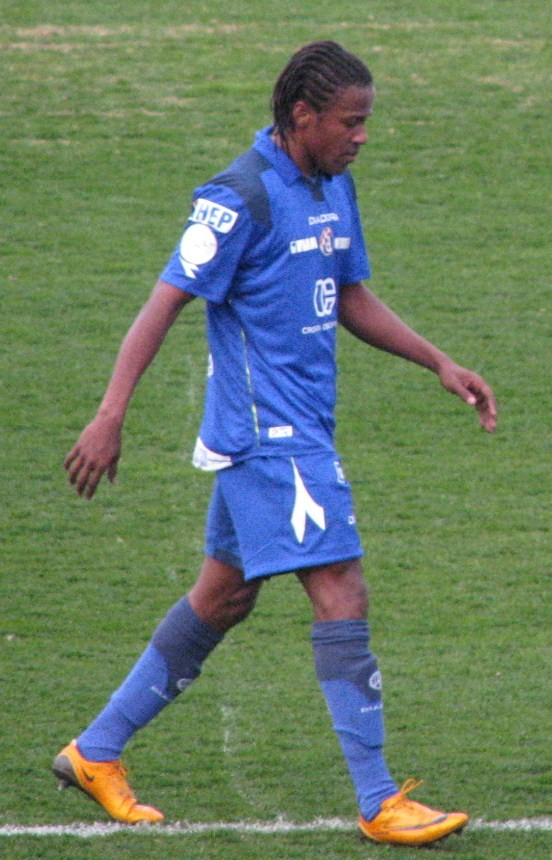
- Dodo playing for Dinamo Zagreb

Personal information
- Full name: Luiz Paulo Hilário
- Date of birth: 16 October 1987 (age 39)
- Place of birth: Rio de Janeiro, Brazil
- Height: 1.74 m (5 ft 9 in)
- Positions: Left winger; attacking midfielder

Team information
- Current team: Grobiņa
- Number: 77

Youth career
- 2007–2009: Juventus–RJ
- 2008: → Profute (loan)

Senior career*
Years	Team	Apps	(Gls)
2009–2010	Inter Zaprešić	30	(9)
2010–2011	Dinamo Zagreb	16	(3)
2011	→ Lokomotiva Zagreb (loan)	12	(2)
2011–2016	Gabala	131	(23)
2016	Joinville	3	(0)
2016–2017	AEL	9	(1)
2018	Penapolense		
2018	Internacional-PB		
2019–2026	Liepāja	175	(67)
2026–	Grobiņa	14	(2)
- * Club domestic league appearances and goals as of 12 November 2026

Luiz Paulo Hilário (born 16 October 1987), commonly known as Dodô, is a Brazilian professional footballer who plays as a forward for Latvian club Grobiņa.

== Career ==
Dodô was born in Rio de Janeiro. He signed for NK Inter Zaprešić in January 2009, on recommendation by Eduardo da Silva, another football player from Rio de Janeiro who played for Inter Zaprešić earlier in his career.

Dodô came to the club during the winter break of the 2008–09 season and since then he scored five goals in 13 league appearances for the Croatian club, including a hat-trick against Rijeka on the final day of the season, on 31 May 2009.

After scoring another four goals in the first half of the 2009–10 season, bring his total to nine goals in 30 games for Inter, Dodô was signed by Croatian giants GNK Dinamo Zagreb. In total he spent 12 months at Dinamo, scoring three times in 20 appearances. He was loaned out to NK Lokomotiva Zagreb for the second half of the 2010–11 season, where he scored twice in 12 appearances.

=== Gabala ===
In the summer of 2011, Dodô signed a two-year contract with Azerbaijan Premier League side Gabala FC, taking the number 77 jersey.

Dodô made his debut in the first game of the season against Baku in a 0–0 draw on 7 August 2011. His first goal for Gabala came in the fifth minute of his second game for the club away to Sumgayit in a game that finished in a 2–1 victory to Gabala. He ended his first season in Gabala with ten goals in all competitions. Following the departure of Deon Burton, Dodô took the number 10 jersey for his second season with Gabala, which saw him score four times in 33 appearances in all competitions to leave him in fifth place in Gabala's all time goal scorers chart with 14 goals.

During Gabala's 2–1 victory over Simurq on 13 September 2014, Dodô scored Gabala's 400th goal. Dodô scored a brace against Super League Greece side Panathinaikos, knocking them out of the 2015–16 UEFA Europa League at the final qualifying stage on away goals, with the tie finish 2–2 on aggregate.

On 4 October 2015, during Gabala's 6–0 victory over Khazar Lankaran, Dodô scored the fastest ever Azerbaijan Premier League at eight seconds.

On 3 December 2015, Dodô made his 150th appearance for Gabala, playing in the first half of their 7–0 victory over Mil-Muğan in the Azerbaijan Cup.

At the end of 2015–16 season, Dodo left Gabala.

=== AEL ===
On 12 August 2016, AEL announced the signing of Dodo on a two-year contract. On 1 October 2016, he scored his first goal in a 1–1 away win against Levadiakos.

=== Liepāja ===
Dodô joined Latvian club FK Liepāja in January 2019.

== Career statistics ==
As of Match played 4 July 2023

Appearances and goals by club, season and competition
Club	Season	League			National Cup		Continental		Total	
Club	Season	Division	Apps	Goals	Apps	Goals	Apps	Goals	Apps	Goals
Inter Zaprešić	2008–09	Prva HNL	13	5	0	0	—		13	5
Inter Zaprešić	2009–10	Prva HNL	17	4			—		17	4
Inter Zaprešić	Total		30	9			—		30	9
Dinamo Zagreb	2009–10	Prva HNL	9	3			—		9	3
Dinamo Zagreb	2010–11	Prva HNL	7	0			4	0	11	0
Dinamo Zagreb	Total		16	3			4	0	20	3
Lokomotiva Zagreb (loan)	2010–11	Prva HNL	12	2			—		12	2
Gabala	2011–12	Azerbaijan Premier League	31	9	3	1	—		34	10
Gabala	2012–13	Azerbaijan Premier League	30	3	3	1	—		33	4
Gabala	2013–14	Azerbaijan Premier League	35	4	5	0	—		40	4
Gabala	2014–15	Azerbaijan Premier League	16	5	2	0	2	0	20	5
Gabala	2015–16	Azerbaijan Premier League	19	2	2	1	13	4	34	7
Gabala	Total	Azerbaijan Premier League	131	23	15	3	15	4	161	30
Joinville	2016	Série B	3	0	0	0	—		3	0
AEL	2016–17	Super League Greece	9	1	2	1	—		11	2
Penapolense	2018	Série A2					—			
Internacional-PB	2018	Paraibano - Série B					—			
Liepāja	2019	Latvian Higher League	24	5	1	0	4	1	29	6
Liepāja	2020	Latvian Higher League	24	18	3	1	—		27	19
Liepāja	2021	Latvian Higher League	23	7	3	0	4	3	30	10
Liepāja	2022	Latvian Higher League	33	13	1	0	4	1	38	14
Liepāja	2023	Latvian Higher League	15	9	0	0	0	0	15	9
Liepāja	Total		119	52	8	1	12	5	139	58
Career total			320	90	25	5	31	9	376	104
