= Veseljko Trivunović =

Serbian footballer

Personal information
- Full name: Veseljko Trivunović
- Date of birth: 13 January 1980 (age 46)
- Place of birth: Banja Luka, SR Bosnia and Herzegovina, SFR Yugoslavia
- Height: 1.80 m (5 ft 11 in)
- Position: Midfielder

Team information
- Current team: FK Soko

Youth career
- Mladi Zadrugar
- Red Star Belgrade

Senior career*
Years	Team	Apps	(Gls)
2000–2005	Red Star Belgrade	0	(0)
2000–2002	→ Loznica (loan)	43+	(12+)
2003	→ Jedinstvo Ub (loan)	14	(8)
2003	→ Radnički Obrenovac (loan)	13	(0)
2004–2005	→ Jedinstvo Ub (loan)	50	(11)
2005–2006	ČSK Čelarevo	34	(4)
2006–2007	Mladost Apatin	24	(0)
2007–2009	Vojvodina	42	(2)
2009–2011	OFK Beograd	50	(5)
2011–2012	Gabala	14	(0)
2012–2013	OFK Beograd	19	(2)
2013–2014	Spartak Subotica	27	(2)
2014–2018	OFK Bačka	119	(18)
2019–2020	ČSK Čelarevo		
2020–2021	Hajduk Divoš		
2021–2023	Soko Nova Gajdobra		
2024	Kulpin	12	(0)
2024–	OFK Stari Grad		

International career
2010–2011	Serbia	6	(1)

Managerial career
- 2020–2021: Soko Nova Gajdobra (youth)
- 2021–2023: Soko Nova Gajdobra (player-manager)
- 2024: Kulpin (player-manager)
- * Club domestic league appearances and goals

Veseljko Trivunović (Serbian Cyrillic: Весељко Тривуновић; born 13 January 1980) is a Serbian footballer who plays as a midfielder for amateur club FK Soko.

== Club career ==
Trivunović came through the youth system of Red Star Belgrade, but failed to make his official first team debut. He instead went on loans to several domestic clubs. After his contract expired in 2005, Trivunović joined ČSK Čelarevo, displaying performances that would secure him a move to newly promoted Serbian SuperLiga side Mladost Apatin in 2006. He subsequently spent two seasons at both Vojvodina and OFK Beograd, before moving abroad in 2011.

Following a season in Azerbaijan, Trivunović returned to OFK Beograd in 2012. He also played for Spartak Subotica before joining OFK Bačka in 2014. During his four and a half seasons with the club, Trivunović helped them earn promotion to the Serbian SuperLiga for the first time ever in 2016. He would move to Serbian League Vojvodina side ČSK Čelarevo in the 2019 winter transfer window.

In 2020, Trivunović accepted an offer from Vojvodina League South club Hajduk Divoš. He simultaneously started working with the youth setup at Soko Nova Gajdobra, also taking on a role as first team coach. In 2021, Trivunović became player-manager of Soko Nova Gajdobra, helping them win promotion. He would join fellow PFL Sombor side Kulpin as player-manager in 2024, leading them to the title.

== International career ==
On 12 November 2010, the 30-year-old Trivunović received his first call-up to the Serbia national team by manager Vladimir Petrović, making his debut as a second-half substitute for Nenad Milijaš and providing an assist for Nikola Žigić's winning goal in a 1–0 away friendly win over Bulgaria five days later. He scored his first international goal in his second cap, sealing the 2–0 victory away at Israel on 9 February 2011. In total, Trivunović was capped six times for Serbia.
