= Arif İsayev =

Azerbaijani footballer (born 1985)

Arif Isayev
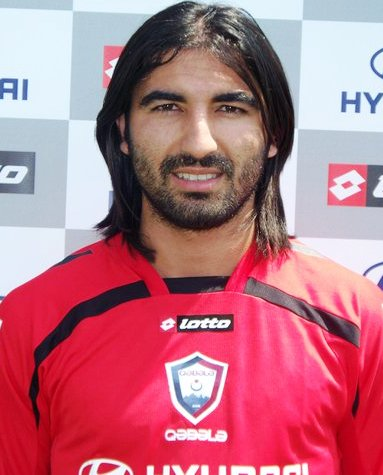
- İsayev in 2010

Personal information
- Full name: Arif Aydin oglu Isayev
- Date of birth: 28 July 1985 (age 41)
- Place of birth: Baku, Azerbaijan SSR, Soviet Union
- Height: 1.80 m (5 ft 11 in)
- Position: Attacking midfielder

Senior career*
Years	Team	Apps	(Gls)
2003	Khazar Sumgayit	-	(4)
2004	Goycha Baku	-	(7)
2006–2007	Gänclärbirliyi Sumqayit	10	(2)
2007–2009	Simurq	13	(15)
2009–2010	Mughan	13	(0)
2010	Standard Sumgayit	13	(1)
2011–2012	Gabala	37	(17)
2012–2013	AZAL	4	(0)
2013	Denizlispor	17	(7)

International career^{‡}
2011–2013	Azerbaijan	17	(3)
- * Club domestic league appearances and goals as of 21 December 2017 ‡ National team caps and goals as of 21 December 2017

Arif İsayev (born 28 July 1985 in Baku) is an Azerbaijani retired footballer who played as an attacking midfielder in both Azerbaijan and Turkey.

== Career ==
=== Club ===
In summer 2012, İsayev left Gabala to join AZAL, six months later İsayev left AZAL to join Denizlispor on a contract until the summer 2014. In November 2013, İsayev had his contract with Denizlispor terminated by mutual consent.

== Career statistics ==
=== Club ===
As of match played 6 October 2013

Appearances and goals by club, season and competition
Club	Season	League			National Cup		Continental		Other		Total	
Club	Season	Division	Apps	Goals	Apps	Goals	Apps	Goals	Apps	Goals	Apps	Goals
Gänclärbirliyi Sumqayit	2006–07	Azerbaijan Top League	10	2			–		–		10	2
Simurq	2007–08	Azerbaijan Premier League	12	1			–		–		12	1
Simurq	2008–09	Azerbaijan Premier League	1	0			–		–		1	0
Simurq	Total		13	1			-	-	-	-	13	1
Mughan	2009–10	Azerbaijan Premier League	13	0			–		–		13	0
Standard Sumgayit	2009–10	Azerbaijan Premier League	13	1	2	0	–		–		15	1
Gabala	2010–11	Azerbaijan Premier League	25	2	3	0	–		–		28	2
Gabala	2011–12	Azerbaijan Premier League	11	0	2	0	–		–		13	0
Gabala	Total		36	2	5	0	-	-	-	-	41	2
AZAL	2012–13	Azerbaijan Premier League	4	0	1	0	–		–		5	0
Denizlispor	2012–13	TFF First League	12	3	0	0	-		-		12	3
Denizlispor	2013–14	TFF First League	5	0	1	0	-		-		6	0
Denizlispor	Total		17	3	1	0	-	-	-	-	18	3
Career total			106	9	9	0	-	-	-	-	115	9

=== International ===
Azerbaijan national team
Year	Apps	Goals
2011	4	0
2012	0	0
2013	1	0
Total	5	0

Statistics accurate as of match played 29 May 2013
