= Ljubo Baranin =

Serbian professional footballer

Personal information
- Full name: Ljubo Baranin
- Date of birth: 25 August 1986 (age 40)
- Place of birth: Belgrade, SFR Yugoslavia
- Height: 1.95 m (6 ft 5 in)
- Position: Defender

Youth career
- Železnik

Senior career*
Years	Team	Apps	(Gls)
2004–2005	Dorćol	31	(2)
2005–2007	Beograd	63	(4)
2007–2009	Bežanija	40	(6)
2009–2012	Qabala	82	(4)
2012	Kapaz Ganja	3	(0)
2012	Novi Pazar	3	(0)
2013–2014	Bežanija	23	(1)
2014–2015	Radnik Surdulica	38	(0)
2015–2017	Kuantan	70	(10)
2018	Dinamo Vranje	6	(1)
2018	Kolubara		
2019	Radnički Novi Beograd		
2021–2023	KFK Ravna Gora	20	(3)

International career^{‡}
2007	Serbia U21	1	(0)
- * Club domestic league appearances and goals as of 16 March 2019 ‡ National team caps and goals as of 18 December 2017

Ljubo Baranin (Serbian Cyrillic: Љубо Баранин; born 25 August 1986) is a Serbian retired footballer who played as a defender. He was well known for his long-range powerful throw-in ability.

== Club career ==
Born in Belgrade, Baranin came through the youth ranks of Železnik, before making his senior debut with Dorćol in the 2003–04 season. He also played for Beograd from 2005 to 2007. In the summer of 2009, Baranin signed with Bežanija. He spent two seasons at the club, before moving abroad and joining Azerbaijani club Gabala in the summer of 2009. After three seasons there, Baranin switched to fellow Premier League club Kapaz in the summer of 2012. He left the club after only two months, before returning to his homeland to play with Novi Pazar in the top flight of Serbian football.

In the summer of 2013, Baranin returned to his former club Bežanija. He spent one season there, before moving to Radnik Surdulica in July 2014. In his first season with the club, Baranin helped them win promotion to the nation's top flight for the first time in the club's history. He again moved abroad in October 2015, penning a one-year contract plus a one-year option with Kuantan FA in Malaysia.

== International career ==
In late 2007, after previously being called up to the squad on one occasion, Baranin made one appearance as a substitute for the Serbia U-21.

== Statistics ==
Club	Season	League		Cup		Continental		Total	
Club	Season	Apps	Goals	Apps	Goals	Apps	Goals	Apps	Goals
Gabala	2009–10	30	0	2	0	–		32	0
Gabala	2010–11	27	2	3	1	–		30	3
Gabala	2011–12	25	2	3	0	–		28	2
Kapaz	2012–13	3	0	0	0	–		3	0
Novi Pazar	2012–13	3	0	1	0	–		4	0
Bežanija	2013–14	23	1	1	0	–		24	1
Radnik Surdulica	2014–15	27	0	1	0	–		28	0
Radnik Surdulica	2015–16	11	0	0	0	–		11	0
Career total		149	5	11	1	0	0	160	6

== Honours ==
Radnik Surdulica

- Serbian First League: 2014–15
