= Victor Mendy =

Senegalese footballer (born 1981)

Personal information
- Full name: Victor Mendy
- Date of birth: 22 December 1981 (age 44)
- Place of birth: Dakar, Senegal
- Height: 1.80 m (5 ft 11 in)
- Position: Striker

Senior career*
Years	Team	Apps	(Gls)
2002–2006	Villemomble Sports	34	(19)
2006–2007	Paris FC	30	(12)
2007–2010	Metz	69	(14)
2007–2008	→ Clermont (loan)	21	(8)
2010–2011	Bucaspor	30	(3)
2011–2015	Gabala	112	(29)
2015	NorthEast United	4	(1)
2017–2020	Blanc Mesnil		
- * Club domestic league appearances and goals

Victor Mendy (born 22 December 1981) is a Senegalese professional footballer who plays as a striker. Previously Mendy has played in France for Villemomble Sports, Paris FC, Metz, Clermont and Blanc Mesnil SF, Turkey for Bucaspor, Azerbaijan for Gabala and India for NorthEast United.

== Career ==
=== Paris FC ===
Mendy's career was launched at Paris FC, where he scored 12 goals in 30 games in the Championnat National. His performance attracted the attention of FC Metz.

=== Metz and Clermont ===
Mendy signed a three-year professional contract with Ligue 1 Metz on 1 June 2007, but was loaned to Ligue 2 side Clermont Foot before playing a game. His professional debut for Clermont came on 14 September 2007, in a 1–1 draw at FC Gueugnon. He scored his first professional goal a week later, the opening goal in a 3–0 home win against Dijon FCO. When he returned from his loan spell, Metz had been relegated from Ligue 1, and he never got to play at that level.

=== Bucaspor ===
In June 2010, Mendy moved to Turkey to join Bucaspor.

=== Gabala ===
In the summer of 2011, Mendy signed a two-year contract with Azerbaijan Premier League side Gabala FC, taking the number 9 jersey. He made his debut in the first game of the season against Baku in a 0–0 draw on 7 August 2011. His first goal for Gabala came in the 37th minute of the fourth game of the season away to Qarabağ in a game that finished in a 0–1 victory to Gabala. He ended his first season in Gabala with 9 goals in all competitions. In his second season Mendy scored 6 times in 26 appearances in all competitions to leave him in joint 2nd place in Gabala's all time goal scorers chart with Deon Burton and Yannick Kamanan on 15. During Gabala's 4-0 Victory over Baku on 29 April 2012, Mendy scored Gabala's 300th goal. On 15 September 2013, Mendy scored in Gabala's 1–2 away victory over AZAL to become the club's all-time leading League goal scorer with 17.

Mendy left Gabala at the end of the 2014–15 season, after four-years with the club he'd scored 33 goals in 127 games.

=== North East United ===
On 13 November 2015, it was announced that Victor would be joining Indian Super League team North East United FC as replacement for injured striker Boubacar Sanogo.

=== Blanc Mesnil ===
In 2016 he returned to France, linking up with his old coach Alain Mboma at Blanc Mesnil SF. The side won promotion to Championnat National 3 in summer 2017 as part of the re-structure of the fifth tier of the French football league system.

== Career statistics ==
As of match played 1 July 2020

Appearances and goals by club, season and competition
Club	Season	League			National cup		League cup		Continental		Total	
Club	Season	Division	Apps	Goals	Apps	Goals	Apps	Goals	Apps	Goals	Apps	Goals
Paris FC	2006–07	Championnat National	30	12			—		—		30	12
Metz	2007–08	Ligue 1	0	0	0	0	0	0	—		0	0
Metz	2008–09	Ligue 2	36	5	1	0	3	1	—		40	6
Metz	2009–10	Ligue 2	33	9	1	0	3	0	—		37	9
Metz	Total		69	14	2	0	6	1	0	0	77	15
Clermont (loan)	2007–08	Ligue 2	19	8	2	1	0	0	—		21	9
Bucaspor	2010–11	Süper Lig	16	0	5	1	—		—		21	1
Gabala FC	2011–12	Azerbaijan Premier League	28	8	3	1	—		—		30	9
Gabala FC	2012–13	Azerbaijan Premier League	24	6	2	0	—		—		26	6
Gabala FC	2013–14	Azerbaijan Premier League	35	7	6	3	—		—		41	10
Gabala FC	2014–15	Azerbaijan Premier League	25	8	2	0	—		2	0	29	8
Gabala FC	Total		112	29	13	4	0	0	2	0	127	33
NorthEast United	2015	Indian Super League	4	1	—		—		—		4	1
Blanc Mesnil	2016–17	Division d'Honneur					—		—			
Blanc Mesnil	2017–18	Championnat National 3	26	11	2	2	—		—		12	5
Blanc Mesnil	2018–19	Championnat National 3	25	7	0	0	—		—		12	5
Blanc Mesnil	2019–20	Championnat National 3	3	1	0	0	—		—		3	1
Blanc Mesnil	Total											
Career total			260	67	24	8	6	1	2	0	292	76
