= Daniel Cruz (footballer, born 1982) =

Brazilian footballer

Personal information
- Full name: Daniel Lopez Cruz
- Date of birth: 1 June 1982 (age 44)
- Place of birth: Salvador, Brazil
- Height: 1.81 m (5 ft 11 1/2 in)
- Position: Defender

Senior career*
Years	Team	Apps	(Gls)
2002	Juventude	0	(0)
2003	Corinthians-AL		
2004	CRB		
2004	Mogi Mirim		
2005	Rio Branco-PR		
2005–2006	Legia Warsaw	0	(0)
2006–2007	Pogoń Szczecin	22	(0)
2007	Coritiba	1	(0)
2007	Vitória	9	(0)
2008	Paraná	0	(0)
2008–2010	Naval	50	(1)
2011–2013	Gabala	36	(1)
2014	Itapirense		
2015	Grêmio Barueri		
- * Club domestic league appearances and goals

Daniel Lopez Cruz (born 1 June 1982) is a Brazilian former professional footballer who played as a defender.

== Career statistics ==
As of 2 April 2013

Club statistics
Season	Club	League	League		Cup		League Cup		Other		Total	
Season	Club	League	App	Goals	App	Goals	App	Goals	App	Goals	App	Goals
Portugal			League		Taça de Portugal		Taça da Liga		Europe		Total	
2008–09	Naval 1º de Maio	Primeira Liga	21	1					-		21	1
2009–10	Naval 1º de Maio	Primeira Liga	17	0	4	1	1	0	-		22	1
2010–11	Naval 1º de Maio	Primeira Liga	12	0	0	0	1	0	-		13	0
Azerbaijan			League		Azerbaijan Cup		League Cup		Europe		Total	
2011–12	Gabala	Azerbaijan Premier League	22	1	1	0	-		-		23	1
2012–13	Gabala	Azerbaijan Premier League	13	0	1	0	-		-		14	0
Total	Portugal		50	1	4	1	2	0	-		56	2
Total	Azerbaijan		35	1	2	0	-		-		37	1
Career total			85	2	6	1	2	0	0	0	93	3
