= Sergei Sokolov (footballer, born 1977) =

Russian-Azerbaijani footballer (born 1977)

Personal information
- Full name: Sergei Sokolov
- Date of birth: 12 March 1977 (age 49)
- Place of birth: Stavropol, Russia, USSR
- Height: 1.82 m (6 ft 0 in)
- Position: Defender

Senior career*
| Years | Team | Apps | (Gls) |
| 1997 | Dynamo Stavropol | 11 | (1) |
| 1997–1998 | Lokomotiv Mineralnye Vody | 40 | (0) |
| 2000–2002 | Kavkaztransgaz Izobilny | 90 | (1) |
| 2003–2004 | Okean Nakhodka | 40 | (2) |
| 2005 | Kapaz | 25 | (1) |
| 2006 | Qarabağ | 19 | (2) |
| 2008–2010 | Simurq | 41 | (4) |
| 2010–2012 | Gabala | 12 | (0) |

International career^{‡}
| 2006 | Azerbaijan | 7 | (0) |
- * Club domestic league appearances and goals ‡ National team caps and goals as of 29 September 2009

Sergei Sokolov (born 12 March 1977) is a Russian-born retired naturalized Azerbaijani footballer who played as a defender.

== International career ==
Sokolov was invited by Shahin Diniyev to play for Azerbaijan, which Sokolov earned 4 caps in Euro 2008 qualifying, before tested positive after the match against Belgium, 11 October 2006.

Sokolov was banned from football for 18 months in January 2007, after testing positive for betamethasone.
