= Bruno Silva (footballer, born 1988) =

Brazilian footballer

Personal information
- Full name: Bruno da Silva Barbosa
- Date of birth: 15 February 1988 (age 38)
- Place of birth: Sorocaba, Brazil
- Height: 1.83 m (6 ft 0 in)
- Positions: Defensive midfielder; centre back

Team information
- Current team: Capivariano

Youth career
- 1998–2002: Atlético Sorocaba
- 2002–2008: São Paulo

Senior career*
Years	Team	Apps	(Gls)
2008–2010	São Paulo	5	(0)
2009	→ Toledo (loan)	1	(0)
2010	→ Catanduvense (loan)	0	(0)
2010–2012	Gabala	65	(2)
2013	Atlético Ibirama	12	(1)
2014	Novo Hamburgo	4	(0)
2014	Marcílio Dias	5	(0)
2015–2016	Audax	23	(0)
2016	Oeste	31	(0)
2017	Santa Cruz	46	(1)
2018	Ferroviária	11	(0)
2018–2019	→ Vasco da Gama (loan)	15	(1)
2019	Vasco da Gama	7	(0)
2019–2022	Guarani	96	(2)
2022–2023	Novorizontino	1	(0)
2024–	Capivariano	0	(0)
- * Club domestic league appearances and goals as of 31 August 2019 (UTC)

Bruno da Silva Barbosa (born 15 February 1988), known as Bruno Silva, is a Brazilian footballer who plays for Capivariano. Mainly a defensive midfielder, he can also play as a centre back.

== Career ==
Bruno left Gabala in January 2013, returning to Brazil with Atlético Ibirama.

On 5 March 2014, Novo Hamburgo cancelled Bruno's contract with immediate effect.

Silva joined Guarani FC on 10 June 2019.

== Career statistics ==
As of 21 December 2012

Club statistics
Season	Club	League	League		Cup		League Cup		Other		Total	
Season	Club	League	App	Goals	App	Goals	App	Goals	App	Goals	App	Goals
2010–11	Gabala	Azerbaijan Premier League	17	1	3	0	-		-		20	1
2011–12	Gabala	Azerbaijan Premier League	24	0	3	0	-		-		27	0
2012–13	Gabala	Azerbaijan Premier League	17	1	1	0	-		-		18	1
Total			58	2	7	0	0	0	0	0	65	2

== Honours ==
São Paulo

- Campeonato Brasileiro Série A: 2008
