= Steve Olfers =

Dutch footballer (born 1982)

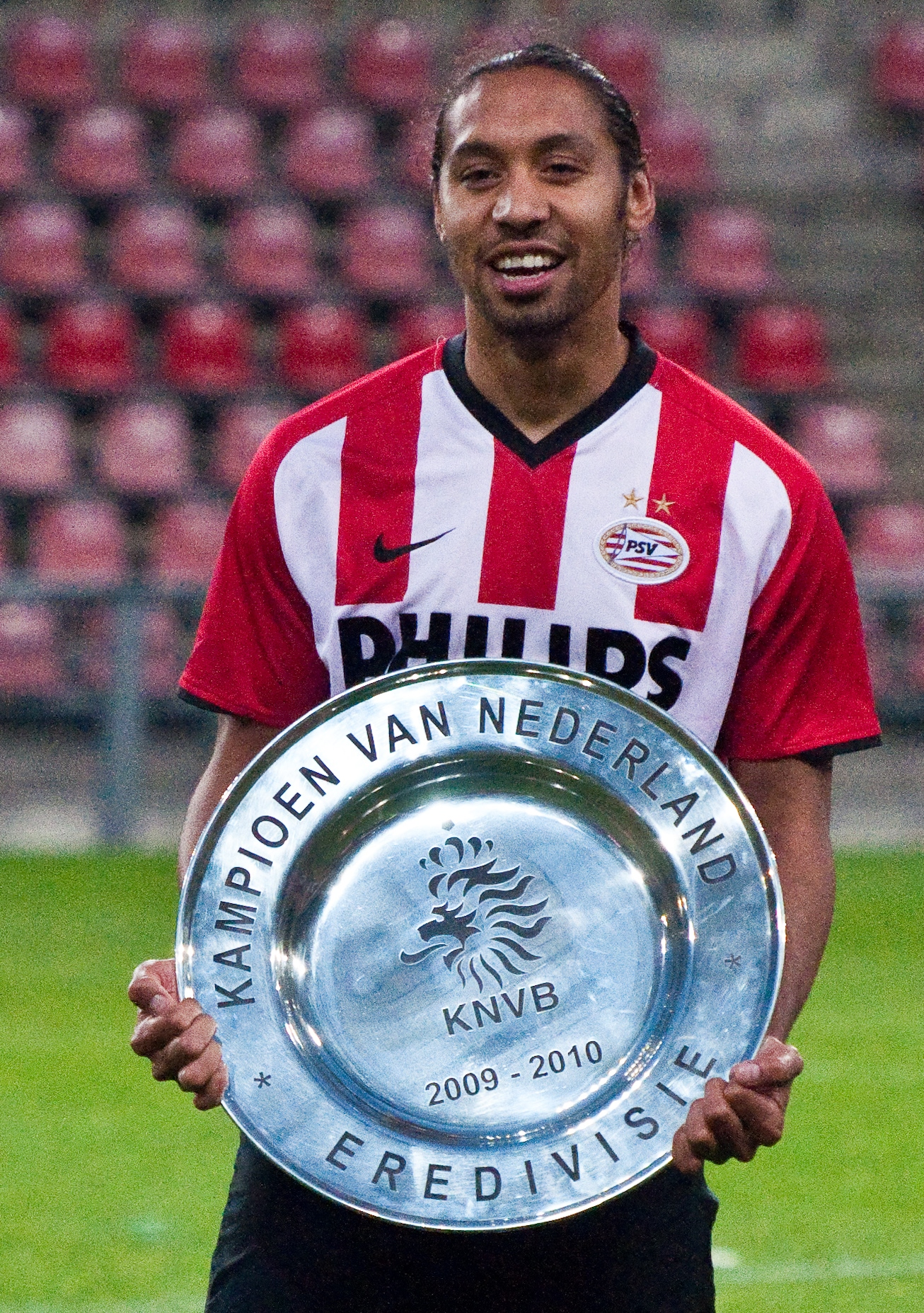
- Olfers at PSV Eindhoven in 2010

Personal information
- Date of birth: 25 February 1982 (age 44)
- Place of birth: Haarlem, Netherlands
- Height: 1.79 m (5 ft 10 in)
- Position: Centre back

Youth career
- DIO Oosterwolde
- Haarlem
- Feyenoord

Senior career*
| Years | Team | Apps | (Gls) |
| 2000–2001 | Feyenoord | 1 | (0) |
| 2001–2003 | Excelsior | 78 | (5) |
| 2003–2004 | RKC Waalwijk | 32 | (1) |
| 2004–2005 | Excelsior | 12 | (1) |
| 2005 | FC Den Bosch | 16 | (1) |
| 2005–2007 | Sparta Rotterdam | 51 | (1) |
| 2007–2009 | AaB | 56 | (1) |
| 2009–2010 | PSV Eindhoven | 0 | (0) |
| 2010–2012 | Gabala | 49 | (0) |
| 2014–2015 | Telstar | 27 | (2) |
- * Club domestic league appearances and goals as of 11 May 2015 (UTC)

Steve Olfers (born 25 February 1982 in Haarlem) is a Dutch former footballer who played as a centre back.

== Career ==
Olfers made his debut in professional football, being part of the Feyenoord squad in the 1999–2000 season. He also played for Excelsior, RKC Waalwijk, FC Den Bosch, Sparta Rotterdam and AaB before joining Gabala in August 2010.

During an interview in July 2013, Olfers stated that he was looking for a new club, preferably outside of the Netherlands. After two-years out of the game, Olfers signed a one-year contract with Eerste Divisie side Telstar in June 2014.

== Career statistics ==
As of 22 October 2015

Club statistics
| Season | Club | League | League | | Cup | | Continental | | Total | |
| Season | Club | League | App | Goals | App | Goals | App | Goals | App | Goals |
|---|---|---|---|---|---|---|---|---|---|---|
| 2007–08 | AaB | Danish Superliga | 21 | 1 | | | — | | 21 | 0 |
| 2008–09 | AaB | Danish Superliga | 21 | 0 | | | 10 | 0 | 31 | 0 |
| 2009–10 | PSV Eindhoven | Eredivisie | 0 | 0 | 0 | 0 | — | | 0 | 0 |
| 2010–11 | Gabala | Azerbaijan Premier League | 25 | 0 | 3 | 0 | — | | 28 | 0 |
| 2011–12 | Gabala | Azerbaijan Premier League | 24 | 0 | 2 | 0 | — | | 26 | 0 |
| 2014–15 | Telstar | Eerste Divisie | 27 | 2 | 1 | 0 | — | | 28 | 2 |
| Total | Denmark | | 42 | 1 | 0 | 0 | 10 | 0 | 52 | 1 |
| Total | Azerbaijan | | 49 | 0 | 5 | 0 | 0 | 0 | 54 | 0 |
| Total | Netherlands | | 27 | 2 | 1 | 0 | 0 | 0 | 28 | 2 |
| Total | | | 120 | 3 | 6 | 0 | 10 | 0 | 132 | 3 |

== Honours ==
=== Club ===
AaB

- Danish Superliga (1): 2007–08
