= Murad Hüseynov =

Azerbaijani footballer (born 1989)

Personal information
- Full name: Murad Saidovich Hüseynov
- Date of birth: 25 January 1989 (age 37)
- Place of birth: Makhachkala, Dagestan ASSR, Russian SFSR, Soviet Union
- Height: 1.90 m (6 ft 3 in)
- Position: Forward

Youth career
- –2006: Anzhi Makhachkala

Senior career*
Years	Team	Apps	(Gls)
2006–2007	Anzhi Makhachkala	22	(5)
2008	Shinnik Yaroslavl	0	(0)
2008	Sheksna Cherepovets	13	(0)
2009–2011	Mladost Lučani	14	(1)
2011–2012	Gabala	24	(4)
2012–2013	Sumgayit	5	(0)
2013	Sloboda Užice	0	(0)
2014	Daugava Daugavpils	6	(1)
2014–2015	Baku	0	(0)

International career
2011	Azerbaijan	5	(1)
- * Club domestic league appearances and goals

Murad Hüseynov (Azerbaijani: Murad Hüseynov, born 25 January 1989) is an Azerbaijani former football forward.

== Club career ==
Hüseynov has been a regular player for FK Mladost Lučani in the Serbian First League (Serbian second tier) where he played between January 2009 and January 2010. Previously he has played for FC Sheksna Cherepovets and FC Anzhi Makhachkala of Russia.

=== FC Gabala ===
In 2011, he was signed by Gabala FC after impressing Tony Adams. On 17 March 2011 Hüseynov made his debut for Gabala FC and also scored what turned out to be the winning goal in their game against FK Mughan.

In the 2012–13 season he played with Sumgayit also in the Azerbaijan Premier League.

=== Sloboda Užice ===
On 9 September 2013, he signed a contract with Serbian top league side FK Sloboda Užice. He was released two months later without making a single appearance.

=== Daugava Daugavpils ===
In March 2014 Huseynov made his league debut for FC Daugava in the Latvian Higher League. He scored his first league goal in a 5–3 victory over FK Liepāja on 30 April 2014, being precise from the penalty spot. In June 2014 he was released.

In January 2015, Hüseynov went on trial with Azerbaijan Premier League side FK Baku.

== International career ==
In December 2010, he received his first call up to Azerbaijan after impressing Berti Vogts and was naturalised as a citizen of Azerbaijan from Russian citizenship.

He debuted against Hungary on 9 February 2011.

=== International goals ===
Scores and results list Azerbaijan's goal tally first.

#	Date	Venue	Opponent	Score	Result	Competition
1.	7 June 2011	Tofiq Bahramov Republican Stadium, Baku, Azerbaijan	Germany	1–2	1–3	UEFA Euro 2012 qualification
