= Serge Djiéhoua =

Ivorian footballer

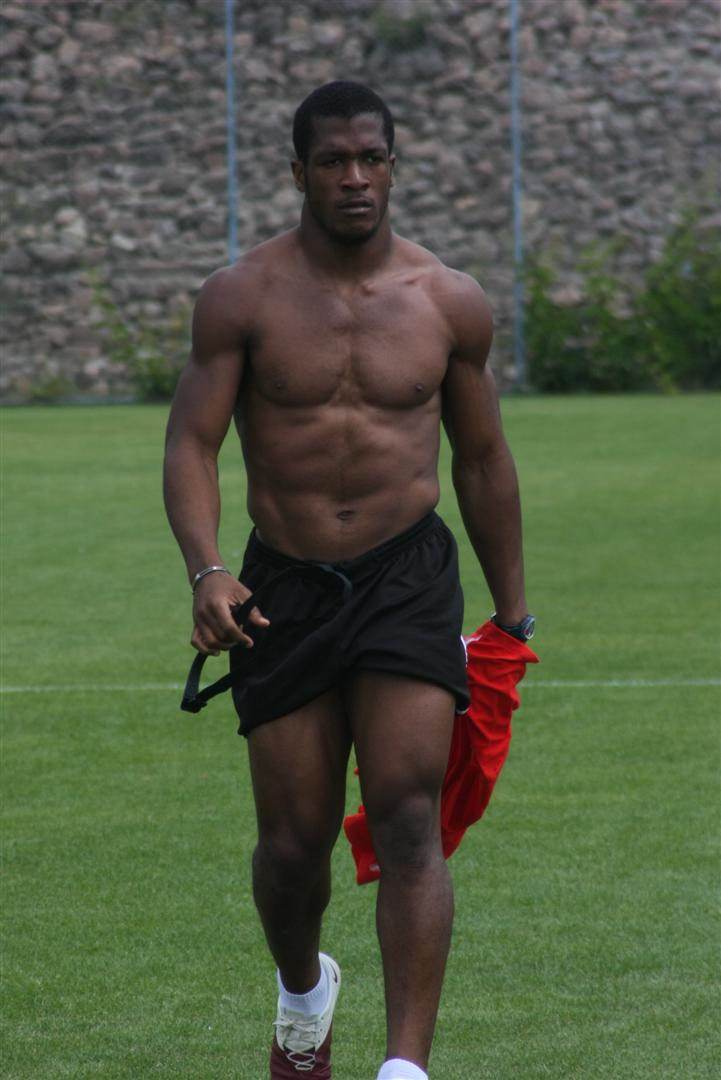

Personal information
- Full name: Serge Pacôme Djiéhoua
- Date of birth: September 25, 1983 (age 43)
- Place of birth: Abidjan, Ivory Coast
- Height: 1.80 m (5 ft 11 in)
- Position: Forward

Team information
- Current team: Sarayköy Spor

Senior career*
Years	Team	Apps	(Gls)
2002–2004	Stella Club		
2005–2008	Kaizer Chiefs		
2007–2008	→ Thanda Royal Zulu (loan)		
2008–2011	Antalyaspor	70	(12)
2011–2012	Gabala	9	(2)
2012–2013	Boluspor	31	(6)
2013	Glyfada	1	(0)
2013–2014	US Monastir	3	(0)
2014–2015	Cizrespor	36	(13)
2015–2016	Ödemişspor	16	(11)
2016–2017	Iğdır Arasspor		
2016–2017	Yozgatspor	2	(2)
2017–2018	Çorluspor		
2017–2018	Bulancakspor		
2018–2019	Serinhisarspor		
2019–	Sarayköy Spor		
- * Club domestic league appearances and goals as of July 23, 2020 ‡ National team caps and goals as of May 19, 2017

Serge Pacôme Djiéhoua (born September 25, 1983, in Abidjan) is an Ivorian footballer who plays as a forward for Sarayköy Spor.

== Career ==
On 24 August 2008, he made his debut for Antalyaspor against Beşiktaş JK in the Süper Lig, scoring his team's second goal in a losing effort. On 23 December, Gabala revealed that Djiéhoua's contract with the club was terminated.

Djiéhoua was sent off seven seconds after coming on in his debut for Glyfada against Olympiacos Volos.

In September 2014, Djiéhoua signed for Cizrespor. He signed for the fourth tier club, because he thought it was the Süper Lig team, Çaykur Rizespor. When he arrived at the airport, he was surprised to be greeted by Cizrespor fans instead of Rizespor fans. It was the moment he realized he signed for the wrong team. He left the club after the 2014 Kobanî protests.

== Career statistics ==
Club performance			League		Cup		Continental		Total	
Season	Club	League	Apps	Goals	Apps	Goals	Apps	Goals	Apps	Goals
2008–09	Antalyaspor	Süper Lig	30	8	5	3	-		35	11
2009–10	Antalyaspor	Süper Lig	19	3	8	5	-		27	8
2010–11	Antalyaspor	Süper Lig	21	1	5	1	-		26	2
2011-12	Gabala	Azerbaijan Premier League	9	2	1	2	-		10	4
2012–13	Boluspor	TFF First League	31	6	1	0	-		32	6
2013–14	Glyfada	Football League	1	0	0	0	-		1	0
2013–14	Monastir	CLP-1	3	0			-		3	0
2014-15	Cizrespor	Turkish Regional Amateur League	6	5	1	0	-		6	6
Total	Turkey		107	23	20	10	-		127	33
Total	Azerbaijan		9	2	1	2	-		10	4
Total	Greece		1	0	0	0	-		1	0
Total	Tunisia		3	0	0	0	-		3	0
Career total			120	25	21	12	-		141	37
