= Anar Salmanov =

Azerbaijani football referee (born 4 October 1980)

- Born: October 4, 1980 (age 46); Baku, Azerbaijan
- Other occupation: Lecturer

Domestic
Years	League	Role
2003–	Azerbaijan Premier League	Referee

International
Years	League	Role
2010–2012	FIFA listed	Referee

Anar Salmanov (Azerbaijani: Anar Salmanov; born 4 October 1980) is an Azerbaijani football referee.

== Biography ==
Salmanov teaches at the Azerbaijan Sport and Health University. He refereed in Azerbaijan Premier League since 2003. He is a UEFA category 2 referee.

== UEFA Euro 2012 Qualifying ==
7 June 2011
20:00 UTC+3

Belarus	2 – 0	Luxembourg
Kornilenko 48' (pen.); Putsila 73'	Report

Dinamo Stadium, Minsk
Attendance: 9,500
Referee: Anar Salmanov (Azerbaijan)
