= Yannick Kamanan =

French footballer (born 1981)

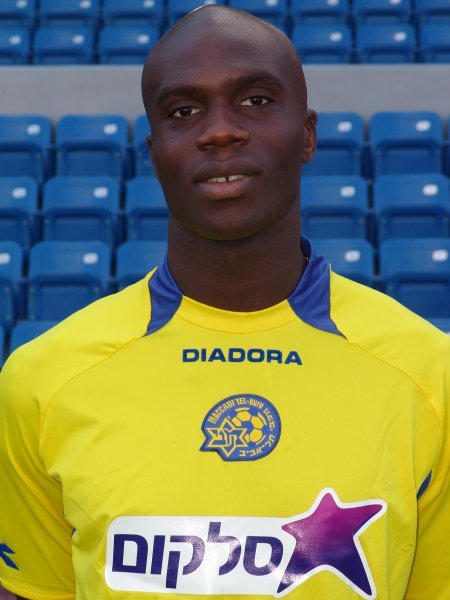

Personal information
- Full name: Yannick Étienne Stanislas Kamanan
- Date of birth: 5 October 1981 (age 45)
- Place of birth: Saint-Pol-sur-Mer, France
- Height: 1.90 m (6 ft 3 in)
- Position: Striker

Youth career
- 1998–1999: Le Mans
- 1999–2001: Tottenham Hotspur

Senior career*
Years	Team	Apps	(Gls)
2001–2002	Tottenham Hotspur	0	(0)
2002–2003	Strasbourg	3	(0)
2003–2004	Dijon	21	(3)
2004–2005	Gazélec Ajaccio	0	(0)
2005–2006	K.V. Oostende	26	(6)
2006	FC Schaffhausen	8	(2)
2007	Maccabi Herzliya	17	(6)
2007–2009	Maccabi Tel Aviv	45	(15)
2009–2011	Sivasspor	52	(11)
2011	Mersin İdmanyurdu	8	(0)
2012–2014	Gabala	62	(16)
2015–2016	Aulnoye	18	(5)
2016–2017	ES Viry-Châtillon	14	(2)
2017–2018	Ware	6	(5)
- * Club domestic league appearances and goals

Yannick Étienne Stanislas Kamanan (born 5 October 1981) is a French footballer, who last played for Ware and as a striker.

== Career ==
In January 2009 Kamanan signed for Sivasspor until June 2011. On 3 February 2009 he scored his first goal for the club in a Turkish Cup quarter final match against Galatasaray which helped Sivasspor advance to the semi-final.

On 4 August 2009, at the start of the 2009–10 season, he scored Sivas's second goal in their Champions League game against Anderlecht in the second leg of the third round qualifying. The game ended 3–1 to Sivas.

On 7 January 2012, Kamanan signed a two-half-year contract with Gabala FC in Azerbaijan. After 60 appearances for the club and 17 goals, ranking third in their all time goalscorers list.

In August 2015, after a year without a club, Kamanan signed for Championnat de France amateur 2 Aulnoye.

On 7 July 2017, Ware F.C. announced the signing of Kamanan.

== Personal life ==
Kamanan holds French and Ivorian nationalities.

== Career statistics ==
As of Match played 12 April 2014

Club performance			League		Cup		League Cup		Continental		Total	
Season	Club	League	Apps	Goals	Apps	Goals	Apps	Goals	Apps	Goals	Apps	Goals
2001–02	Tottenham Hotspur	Premier League	0	0	0	0	—		—		0	0
2002–03	RC Strasbourg	Ligue 1	3	0	0	0	—		—		3	0
2003-04	Dijon FCO	Championnat National	21	3	0	0	—		—		21	3
2004-05	Gazélec Ajaccio	Championnat National	0	0	0	0	—		—		0	0
2005-06	K.V. Oostende	Belgian Second Division	26	6	0	0	—		—		26	6
2006–07	FC Schaffhausen	Swiss Super League	8	2	0	0	—		—		8	2
2006–07	Maccabi Herzliya	Israeli Premier League	17	8	0	0	—		—		17	8
2007–08	Maccabi Tel Aviv	Israeli Premier League	45	5	0	0	—		—		45	5
2008–09	Maccabi Tel Aviv	Israeli Premier League	45	5	0	0	—		—		45	5
2008–09	Sivasspor	Süper Lig	17	4	7	2	—		—		17	4
2009–10	Sivasspor	Süper Lig	26	6	7	2	—		—		26	6
2010–11	Sivasspor	Süper Lig	9	1	7	2	—		—		9	1
2011–12	Mersin İdmanyurdu	Süper Lig	8	0	7	1	—		—		8	1
2011–12	Gabala	Azerbaijan Premier League	14	9	2	0	—		—		16	9
2012–13	Gabala	Azerbaijan Premier League	30	5	3	1	—		—		33	6
2013–14	Gabala	Azerbaijan Premier League	18	2	1	0	—		—		18	2
Total	England		0	0	0	0	0	0	0	0	0	0
Total	France		24	3	0	0	0	0	0	0	24	3
Total	Belgium		26	6	0	0	0	0	0	0	26	6
Total	Switzerland		8	2	0	0	0	0	0	0	8	2
Total	Israel		62	13	0	0	0	0	0	0	62	13
Total	Turkey		60	11	7	3	0	0	0	0	67	14
Total	Azerbaijan		62	16	6	1	0	0	0	0	68	17
Career total			241	51	13	4	0	0	0	0	254	55

== Honours ==
Maccabi Herzliya

- Toto Cup: 2006–07
