= Sasha Yunisoglu =

Azerbaijani footballer (born 1985)

Saşa Yunisoğlu
Personal information
- Date of birth: 18 December 1985 (age 40)
- Place of birth: Mykolaiv, Ukraine-Soviet Union
- Height: 1.85 m (6 ft 1 in)
- Position: Defender

Senior career*
Years	Team	Apps	(Gls)
2002	Inter Baku	4	(0)
2003	Neftchi Baku	2	(0)
2003–2004	Bakılı PFK	15	(0)
2004–2007	MKT Araz	55	(2)
2007–2008	Dyskobolia Grodzisk	8	(0)
2008–2009	Polonia Warsaw	0	(0)
2009–2010	Baku	18	(0)
2010–2012	Gabala	44	(3)
2012	Neftchi Baku	1	(0)
2013	AZAL	1	(0)
2013–2014	Denizlispor	18	(0)
2014	Araz-Naxçıvan	3	(0)
2015–2016	Ravan Baku	18	(0)
2016–2017	Sabail	22	(3)
Total		209	(8)

International career
2004–2006	Azerbaijan U21	4	(0)
2007–2011	Azerbaijan	28	(0)
- * Club domestic league appearances and goals

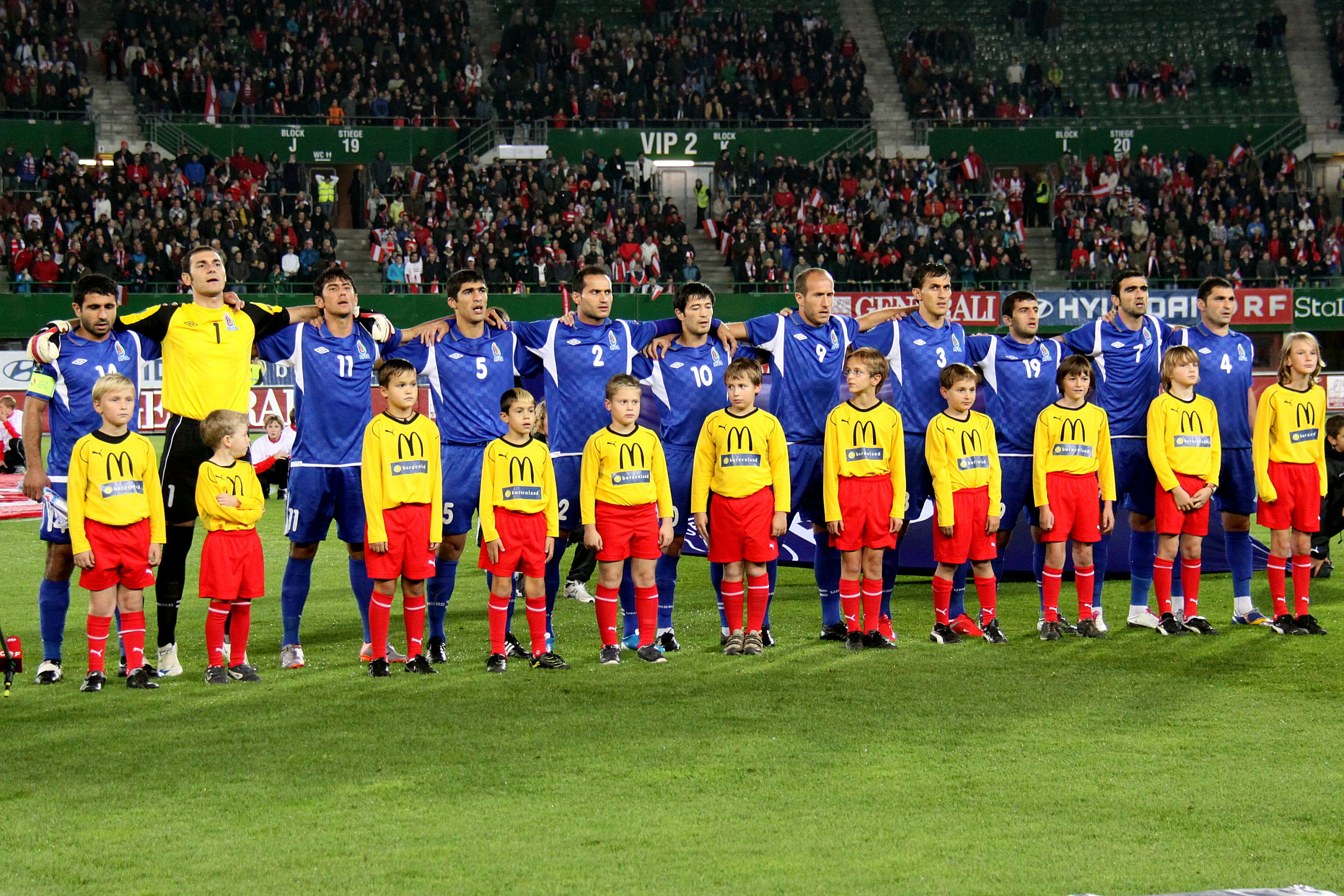
Sasha Yunisoglu (In Jersey Number 7 in back row) with teammates, 2010.

Saşa Yunisoğlu or Sasha Yunisoglu (born 18 December 1985 in Mykolaiv, now Ukraine) is an Azerbaijani former professional footballer who played as a defender.

== Career ==
=== Club ===
Yunisoğlu started his career with Azerbaijani side MKT-Araz Imishli. He moved to Polish club Dyskobolia, after a match between the two clubs. He made his Ekstraklasa debut against Zagłębie Lubin on 7 October 2007. He was the second Azerbaijani to have played in Ekstraklasa. Dyskobolia finished the 2007–08 Ekstraklasa season in third.

On 9 January 2009, he returned to Azerbaijan to join FC Baku.

In June 2013, Yunisoğlu signed for Sumgayit. However, two weeks later Yunisoğlu cancelled his contract with the club and signed with Turkish side Denizlispor. In April 2014, Yunisoğlu left Denizlispor, citing unpaid wages. Yunisoğlu was made a free agent when Araz-Naxçıvan folded and withdrew from the Azerbaijan Premier League on 17 November 2014.

After nearly a year without a club, Yunisoğlu signed for Ravan Baku on 21 October 2015.

=== International ===
Yunisoglu earned 28 caps for the Azerbaijan national team, making his debut in 2007 against Uzbekistan.

== Career statistics ==
=== International ===
Appearances and goals by national team and year
National team	Year	Apps	Goals
Azerbaijan
Azerbaijan	2007	4	0
Azerbaijan	2008	8	0
Azerbaijan	2009	8	0
Azerbaijan	2010	6	0
Azerbaijan	2011	2	0
Total		28	0

== Honours ==
Dyskobolia Grodzisk

- Ekstraklasa Cup: 2007–08

FC Baku

- Azerbaijan Premier League: 2008–09
- Azerbaijan Cup: 2009–10
