= Deon Burton =

English-Jamaican footballer (born 1976)

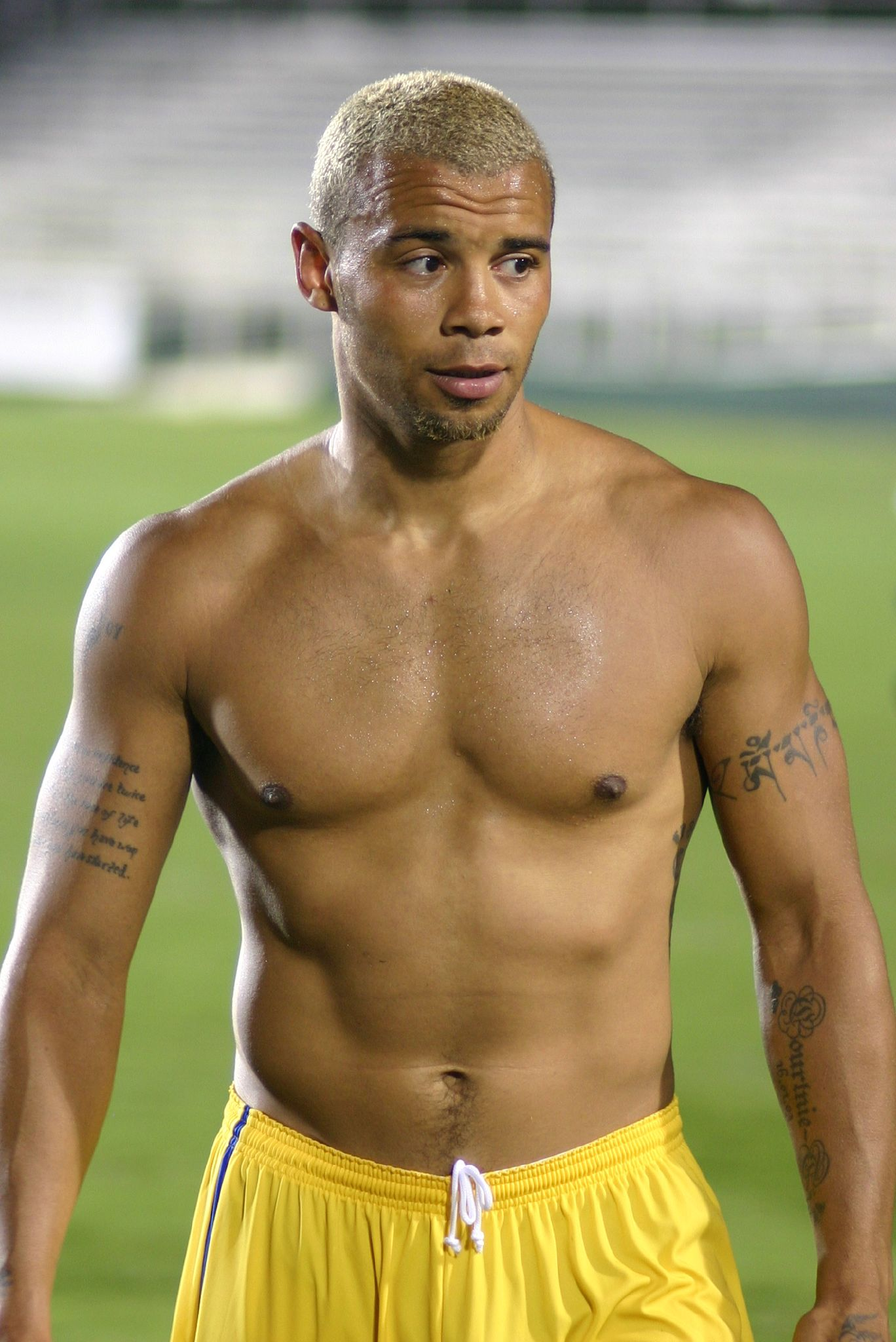
- Burton in 2006

Personal information
- Full name: Deon John Burton
- Date of birth: 25 October 1976 (age 49)
- Place of birth: Reading, England
- Height: 5 ft 9 in (1.75 m)
- Position: Striker

Youth career
- –1994: Portsmouth

Senior career*
Years	Team	Apps	(Gls)
1994–1997	Portsmouth	62	(10)
1996–1997	→ Cardiff City (loan)	5	(2)
1997–2002	Derby County	125	(25)
1998	→ Barnsley (loan)	3	(0)
2002	→ Stoke City (loan)	12	(2)
2002	→ Portsmouth (loan)	6	(3)
2002–2004	Portsmouth	10	(1)
2003	→ Walsall (loan)	3	(0)
2003	→ Swindon Town (loan)	4	(1)
2004–2005	Brentford	40	(10)
2005–2006	Rotherham United	24	(12)
2006–2009	Sheffield Wednesday	116	(24)
2008–2009	→ Charlton Athletic (loan)	7	(1)
2009–2010	Charlton Athletic	52	(17)
2010–2012	Gabala	49	(15)
2012–2013	Gillingham	40	(12)
2013–2015	Scunthorpe United	34	(6)
2014	→ York City (loan)	1	(0)
2015	Eastleigh	12	(2)
2015	Brackley Town	4	(0)
2015–2016	Worcester City	23	(5)
Total		632	(148)

International career
1997–2009	Jamaica	62	(13)

Managerial career
- 2019–2020: West Bromwich Albion U23 (caretaker)
- 2020–: West Bromwich Albion U23
- * Club domestic league appearances and goals

Deon John Burton (born 25 October 1976) is a football coach and former professional footballer who played as a striker and who is the manager of EFL Championship club West Bromwich Albion's under-23 team. His numerous clubs in English football included Portsmouth, Derby County and Sheffield Wednesday. He represented Jamaica internationally, including at the 1998 World Cup, and was named Jamaican Sportsman of the Year in 1997.

== Club career ==
=== Early career ===
Born in Reading, Berkshire, Burton began his professional career with Portsmouth, with whom he made his debut in the 1993–94 season, playing in two games. Burton would play intermittently for Portsmouth over the next three seasons and scored the goal that kept the club in the First Division in a 1–0 final day win against Huddersfield Town in May 1996.

In 1997, former Portsmouth manager Jim Smith signed Burton for Premier League club Derby County in a £1 million move.

=== Derby County, return to Portsmouth and loans ===
Burton would again struggle to establish a starting role at Derby, playing intermittently there with loans at other clubs including Stoke in February 2002, and a second spell at Portsmouth, which began in August 2002. He returned to Derby in September having broken a bone in his foot, but later signed for Portsmouth in December 2002 for a fee rising to £250,000 and Portsmouth were promoted at the end of the season. Burton stayed shortly at Portsmouth, but, unable to establish a starting role, was loaned to Walsall and Swindon Town, where he scored once against Wycombe Wanderers. In July 2004 he signed for Brentford, playing for them in the 2004–05 campaign and helping the club to the League One play-off semi-finals against Sheffield Wednesday as their top scorer.

=== Rotherham United ===
In July 2005 he joined Rotherham United on a free transfer, signing a contract for two years. After scoring 14 goals in the first half of the season, including a hat-trick in a 4–0 victory against Blackpool, Burton put in a transfer request in December 2005.

=== Sheffield Wednesday ===
Sheffield Wednesday bought Burton from Rotherham United in January 2006 for a fee of £110,000, after he had failed to turn up at the Yorkshire derby between Rotherham and Doncaster Rovers on New Year's Eve. He scored his first goal for Wednesday in March 2006 against Queens Park Rangers.

He went on to play a crucial part in Sheffield Wednesday's Championship survival and returned to play against his old club Derby County on the final day of the 2005–06 season, captaining the Wednesday side to a 2–0 victory with another former Ram, Marcus Tudgay, scoring the first goal.

His good form for Wednesday led to a recall to the international stage. Named as a standby for the friendlies against Ghana and England, he was eventually called up as a replacement for Watford striker Marlon King who was sent home for a breach of discipline. Burton made a second-half appearance as substitute in the 6–0 defeat to England.

Despite only scoring one goal with four months of the 2006–07 campaign gone, Burton's second half of season form was excellent. He scored 12 more goals, making him the club's joint top scorer for the season, alongside Steve MacLean.

Burton reached a milestone 100 career goals at club level on 26 December 2007, scoring a penalty against Burnley at Turf Moor. On the last day of the season against Norwich, with Wednesday needing a win to guarantee survival, Burton cancelled out Darren Huckerby's opening goal with a penalty, before scoring his second, and Wednesday's third, later in the game, which was won 4–1 by Wednesday. These two goals brought his tally for the season to nine goals in all competitions, again making him the club's top scorer for the 2007–08 season. Burton scored his first goal of the 2008–09 season on 25 November 2008, in Wednesday's 0–2 away win at Blackpool.

=== Charlton Athletic ===
Burton joined Championship side Charlton Athletic on loan on 27 November 2008 with a view to a permanent move, Wednesday manager Brian Laws citing Burton's poor start to the 2008–09 season for the move as well as not being able to give the player assurances over his long-term future at Hillsborough. On 2 January 2009, Burton was named as a permanent Charlton player, joining the club on a free transfer.

=== Gabala ===
In 2010, Burton joined Azerbaijan Premier League outfit Gabala under the management of Tony Adams signing a two-year contract. After two years and 15 goals in the 50 league games, Burton left Gabala at the end of the 2011–12 season.

=== Gillingham ===
On 7 August 2012, Burton signed a one-year deal at League Two club Gillingham, turning down the offer of a deal at an unnamed League One side. He made his debut for Gillingham on 18 August 2012 in 3–1 win over Bradford City. He scored his first goal for the club on 25 August in a 2–1 win away to Dagenham & Redbridge. While with the Gills Burton scored 13 goals in all competitions and won the League Two title, but was not offered an extension to his contract and left the club.

=== Later career ===
Burton signed for League Two club Scunthorpe United on a one-year deal on 22 July 2013 after impressing on trial. He joined League Two team York City, managed by his former Scunthorpe manager Russ Wilcox, on a one-month loan on 30 October 2014. He made his debut two days later in a 1–0 away win over Cheltenham Town, but after being ruled out for two to three months with a medial ligament injury sustained in his second appearance for the club, the loan came to an end on 12 November 2014.

Burton was released from Scunthorpe in January 2015 and then joined Eastleigh the following month.

After a short spell at Eastleigh, Burton signed for Brackley Town on 8 August 2015. He then moved on to Worcester City in September 2015. He retired from football at the end of the 2015–16 season.

Burton now runs a football training company called Deon Burton Training Academy.

== Coaching career ==
In 2018, Burton joined West Bromwich Albion as a youth coach. In July 2020, Burton was named as the manager of the U23 team after he had impressed when he took over on a temporary basis when Michael Appleton left the role to join to Lincoln City in September 2019. On 13 May 2022, Burton lead West Brom U23 to victory in the 2021–22 Premier League Cup, beating Wolverhampton Wanderers U23s on penalties in the final.

== International career ==
Burton made his debut for the Jamaica national team on 7 September 1997 in the latter stages of their 1998 FIFA World Cup qualifying campaign. He finished with four goals from five games, an exploit which won him Jamaican Sportsman of the Year Award for almost single-handedly getting the country to the 1998 FIFA World Cup finals. However, he failed to score in France. He also appeared in each of Jamaica's games as they finished fourth in the 1998 CONCACAF Gold Cup but he failed to score. He was also in the squad that failed to qualify for the 2002 FIFA World Cup and was again included on the roster for the 2000 CONCACAF Gold Cup.

He was included in the qualifying squad for the 2003 CONCACAF Gold Cup, making substitute appearances but was dropped from the squad after qualification.

Burton had to wait three years for his next international involvement – coming against the country of his birth England. Good form for Sheffield Wednesday meant that he was recalled for a friendly match against Trinidad and Tobago on 27 March 2008. He came on as a second-half substitute for Marlon King in a 2–2 draw. He kept his place in the squad for the next friendly game against Saint Vincent and the Grenadines on 3 June, again coming off the bench for King in the second half, to score his side's fourth goal a minute later and also to cross for Ricardo Gardner to score the fifth and final goal in the 87th minute of a 5–1 victory.

== Career statistics ==
=== Club ===
Appearances and goals by club, season and competition
Club	Season	League			National cup (Note: Appearances in FA Cup and Azerbaijan Cup)		League Cup		Other		Total	
Club	Season	Division	Apps	Goals	Apps	Goals	Apps	Goals	Apps	Goals	Apps	Goals
Portsmouth	1993–94	First Division	2	0	0	0	0	0	0	0	2	0
Portsmouth	1994–95	First Division	7	2	0	0	1	0	—		8	2
Portsmouth	1995–96	First Division	32	7	1	0	2	0	—		35	7
Portsmouth	1996–97	First Division	21	1	1	1	2	2	—		24	4
Portsmouth	Total		62	10	2	1	5	2	0	0	69	13
Cardiff City (loan)	1996–97	Third Division	5	2	—		—		—		5	2
Derby County	1997–98	Premier League	29	3	2	0	1	0	—		32	3
Derby County	1998–99	Premier League	21	9	5	3	1	0	—		27	12
Derby County	1999–2000	Premier League	19	4	1	0	1	0	—		21	4
Derby County	2000–01	Premier League	32	5	2	0	3	1	—		37	6
Derby County	2001–02	Premier League	17	1	0	0	2	2	—		19	3
Derby County	2002–03	First Division	7	3	0	0	0	0	—		7	3
Derby County	Total		125	25	10	3	8	3	—		143	31
Barnsley (loan)	1998–99	First Division	3	0	—		—		—		3	0
Stoke City (loan)	2001–02	Second Division	12	2	—		—		3 (Note: Appearances in Second Division play-offs)	2	15	4
Portsmouth	2002–03	First Division	15	3	1	0	—		—		16	4
Portsmouth	2003–04	Premier League	1	0	1	0	0	0	—		2	0
Portsmouth	Total		16	4	2	0	0	0	—		18	4
Walsall (loan)	2003–04	First Division	3	0	—		1	0	—		4	0
Swindon Town (loan)	2003–04	Second Division	4	1	—		—		—		4	1
Brentford	2004–05	League One	40	10	7	0	1	0	2 (Note: Appearances in League One play-offs)	0	50	10
Rotherham United	2005–06	League One	24	12	1	1	2	1	0	0	27	14
Sheffield Wednesday	2005–06	Championship	17	3	—		—		—		17	3
Sheffield Wednesday	2006–07	Championship	42	13	2	0	0	0	—		44	13
Sheffield Wednesday	2007–08	Championship	40	7	2	0	3	2	—		45	9
Sheffield Wednesday	2008–09	Championship	17	1	—		1	0	—		18	1
Sheffield Wednesday	Total		116	24	4	0	4	2	—		124	26
Charlton Athletic	2008–09	Championship	20	5	3	0	—		—		23	5
Charlton Athletic	2009–10	League One	39	13	1	0	1	0	3 (Note: One appearance in Football League Trophy, two appearances and one goal in League One play-offs)	1	44	14
Charlton Athletic	Total		59	18	4	0	1	0	3	1	67	19
Gabala	2010–11	Azerbaijan Premier League	28	9	3	0	—		—		31	9
Gabala	2011–12	Azerbaijan Premier League	21	6	2	0	—		—		23	6
Gabala	Total		49	15	5	0	—		—		54	15
Gillingham	2012–13	League Two	40	12	2	1	1	0	0	0	43	13
Scunthorpe United	2013–14	League Two	29	6	2	0	1	0	1 (Note: Appearance in Football League Trophy)	0	33	6
Scunthorpe United	2014–15	League One	5	0	—		0	0	0	0	5	0
Scunthorpe United	Total		34	6	2	0	1	0	1	0	38	6
York City (loan)	2014–15	League Two	1	0	1	0	—		—		2	0
Eastleigh	2014–15	Conference Premier	12	2	—		—		1 (Note: Appearance in Conference Premier play-offs)	0	13	2
Brackley Town	2015–16	National League North	4	0	—		—		—		4	0
Worcester City	2015–16	National League North	23	5	4	4	—		2 (Note: Appearances in FA Trophy)	0	29	9
Career total			632	148	44	10	24	8	12	3	712	169

=== International ===
Appearances and goals by national team and year
National team	Year	Apps	Goals
Jamaica	1997	9	4
Jamaica	1998	13	0
Jamaica	1999	1	1
Jamaica	2000	9	2
Jamaica	2001	9	2
Jamaica	2002	3	0
Jamaica	2003	5	1
Jamaica	2004	3	0
Jamaica	2006	1	0
Jamaica	2008	8	3
Jamaica	2009	1	0
Total		62	13

== Honours ==
Stoke City

- Football League Second Division play-offs: 2002

Portsmouth

- Football League First Division: 2002–03

Gillingham

- Football League Two: 2012–13

Scunthorpe United

- Football League Two runner-up: 2013–14

Individual

- Football League Two Player of the Month: December 2013

=== As a coach ===
West Bromwich Albion U23

- Premier League Cup: 2021–22
