= List of Azerbaijan football transfers summer 2014 =

This is a list of Azerbaijan football transfers in the summer transfer window 2014 by club. Only clubs of the 2014–15 Azerbaijan Premier League are included.

== Azerbaijan Premier League 2014-15 ==
=== Araz-Naxçıvan ===
In: Note: Flags indicate national team as defined under FIFA eligibility rules; some limited exceptions apply. Players may hold more than one non-FIFA nationality.

No.	Pos.	Nation	Player
6	MF	AZE	Budaq Nəsirov
7	MF	AZE	Ramal Huseynov (from (Azerbaijan) Qaradağ)
9	MF	AZE	Garib Ibrahimov (from (Azerbaijan) AZAL)
11	FW	AZE	Vugar Asgarov
13	DF	AZE	Agil Nabiyev (from (Azerbaijan) Ravan Baku)
14	DF	AZE	Elhad Naziri (from (Azerbaijan) Inter Baku)
15	FW	AZE	Ruslan Nasirli (from (Azerbaijan) Sumgayit)
16	DF	AZE	Emin Jafarguliyev (from (Azerbaijan) AZAL)
23	GK	AZE	Elchin Sadigov (from (Azerbaijan) AZAL)
44	DF	AZE	Saşa Yunisoğlu (from (Turkey) Denizlispor)
85	GK	AZE	Kamal Bayramov (from (Azerbaijan) Ravan Baku)
91	MF	AZE	Kamil Nurähmädov (from (Azerbaijan) Ravan Baku)
—	MF	AZE	Kamil Hüseynov (from (Azerbaijan) Sumgayit)

Out: Note: Flags indicate national team as defined under FIFA eligibility rules; some limited exceptions apply. Players may hold more than one non-FIFA nationality.

No.	Pos.	Nation	Player
1	GK	AZE	Emil Balayev (loan return to (Azerbaijan) Neftchi Baku)
4	DF	AZE	Farman Ganbarov
6	DF	AZE	Mikayil Rahimov
9	MF	AZE	Irfan Yuseinov
11	FW	AZE	Farid Guliyev (to (Azerbaijan) Sumgayit)
16	MF	AZE	Vugar Ahmadov
18	FW	AZE	Ibrahim Aliyev
25	MF	AZE	Elgiz Karimli

=== AZAL ===
In: Note: Flags indicate national team as defined under FIFA eligibility rules; some limited exceptions apply. Players may hold more than one non-FIFA nationality.

No.	Pos.	Nation	Player
6	FW	BRA	Eduardo (from (Lebanon) Al-Ahli Aley)
7	MF	AZE	Tamkin Khalilzade (loan from (Azerbaijan) Qarabağ)
10	MF	BUL	Tomi Kostadinov (from (Greece) Chania)
11	FW	COL	John Córdoba (from (Colombia) América S.A.)
12	MF	HON	Luis Ramos (from (Czech Republic) Teplice)
14	MF	AZE	Asif Mirili (from (Azerbaijan) Inter Baku)
16	GK	MDA	Stanislav Namașco (from (Moldova) FC Dinamo-Auto)
18	DF	AZE	Orkhan Lalayev (loan from (Azerbaijan) Ravan Baku)
20	FW	COD	Freddy Mombongo-Dues (from (Belgium) Royal Antwerp)
22	DF	AZE	Eltun Yagublu (loan from (Azerbaijan) Qarabağ)
30	MF	AZE	Seymur Asadov (loan from (Azerbaijan) Gabala)

Out: Note: Flags indicate national team as defined under FIFA eligibility rules; some limited exceptions apply. Players may hold more than one non-FIFA nationality.

No.	Pos.	Nation	Player
3	DF	AZE	Aleksandr Shemonayev (to (Azerbaijan) Khazar Lankaran)
4	DF	BRA	Junior Ailton
5	MF	AZE	Murad Agayev (to (Azerbaijan) Sumgayit)
7	MF	AZE	Javid Tagiyev (to (Azerbaijan) Qarabağ)
8	MF	AZE	Garib Ibrahimov (to (Azerbaijan) Araz-Naxçıvan)
9	MF	AZE	Orkhan Hasanov (to (Azerbaijan) Ravan Baku)
10	MF	USA	Will John (to (Morocco) MAS Fez)
12	GK	AZE	Jahangir Hasanzade (to (Azerbaijan) Khazar Lankaran)
16	GK	AZE	Elchin Sadigov (to (Azerbaijan) Araz-Naxçıvan)
18	MF	SLE	Samuel Barlay (to (Sweden) Syrianska)
20	DF	SRB	Branislav Arsenijević
21	FW	AZE	Rey Mammadbayli
22	FW	TJK	Akhtam Khamrakulov (to (Tajikistan) Regar-TadAZ)
28	DF	AZE	Emin Jafarguliyev (to (Azerbaijan) Araz-Naxçıvan)
89	FW	BIH	Nedo Turković (to (Bosnia and Herzegovina) Željezničar Sarajevo)
—	GK	AZE	Elmaddin Mammadov
—	GK	AZE	Tural Assad
—	DF	AZE	Elmin Ahmadov
—	MF	AZE	Elgun Abbasli
—	MF	AZE	Farid Ganbarov

=== Baku ===
In: Note: Flags indicate national team as defined under FIFA eligibility rules; some limited exceptions apply. Players may hold more than one non-FIFA nationality.

No.	Pos.	Nation	Player
7	MF	AZE	Nuran Gurbanov (from (Azerbaijan) Gabala)
30	MF	AZE	Jamshid Maharramov (from (Azerbaijan) Ravan Baku)
85	FW	BRA	Jabá (from (Brazil) Juventus)
—	FW	AZE	Rahman Hajiyev (loan return from (Azerbaijan) Sumgayit)

Out: Note: Flags indicate national team as defined under FIFA eligibility rules; some limited exceptions apply. Players may hold more than one non-FIFA nationality.

No.	Pos.	Nation	Player
2	MF	LTU	Deividas Česnauskis (to (Lithuania) FK Trakai)
4	DF	ESP	Mario (to (Spain) Real Zaragoza)
5	DF	ESP	Rubén (to (Spain) Real Zaragoza)
6	FW	AZE	Vagif Abdullayev
7	MF	AZE	Afran Ismayilov (to (Azerbaijan) Khazar Lankaran)
8	FW	AZE	Javid Huseynov (to (Azerbaijan) Gabala)
10	MF	CRO	Aleksandar Šolić
12	DF	BRA	Etto
11	FW	AZE	Rauf Aliyev (to (Azerbaijan) Khazar Lankaran)
13	GK	MKD	Edin Nuredinoski
15	MF	ESP	Alberto Noguera (to (Spain) Trival Valderas)
16	MF	BRA	Juninho
18	MF	ESP	Mario Rubio (to (Spain) Tarazona)
19	FW	ROU	Marius Pena (to (Romania) Concordia Chiajna)
20	MF	LTU	Mindaugas Kalonas (to (Israel) Hapoel Haifa, previously on loan to (Azerbaijan) Simurq)
21	MF	AZE	Elvin Mammadov (to (Azerbaijan) Inter Baku)
22	FW	AZE	Namig Alasgarov (to (Azerbaijan) Qarabağ)
31	FW	AZE	Vugar Mustafayev (to (Azerbaijan) Simurq)
34	DF	AZE	Shahriyar Aliyev (to (Azerbaijan) Qarabağ)
—	FW	AZE	Rahman Hajiyev (loan to (Turkey) Gaziantep BB)
—	DF	AZE	Vadim Abdullayev (to (Azerbaijan) Simurq)
—	MF	AZE	David Alesgerov

=== Gabala ===
In: Note: Flags indicate national team as defined under FIFA eligibility rules; some limited exceptions apply. Players may hold more than one non-FIFA nationality.

No.	Pos.	Nation	Player
7	DF	AZE	Ruslan Amirjanov (from (Azerbaijan) Inter Baku)
8	MF	BRA	Marquinhos (from (Romania) Oțelul Galați)
11	FW	ROU	Andrei Cristea (from (Romania) FC Brașov)
12	DF	ROU	Alexandru Benga (from (Bulgaria) Botev Plovdiv)
14	FW	AZE	Javid Huseynov (from (Azerbaijan) Baku)
15	DF	AZE	Ruslan Abishov (loan from (Russia) Rubin Kazan)
21	FW	POR	Yazalde (loan from (Portugal) S.C. Braga)
25	MF	ROU	Adrian Ropotan (from (Russia) Volga Nizhny Novgorod)
26	DF	SVK	Pavol Farkaš (from (Italy) Chievo Verona)
27	FW	AZE	Bakhtiyar Soltanov (from (Azerbaijan) Araz-Naxçıvan)
90	FW	NGA	Ekigho Ehiosun (loan from (Turkey) Gençlerbirliği)

Out: Note: Flags indicate national team as defined under FIFA eligibility rules; some limited exceptions apply. Players may hold more than one non-FIFA nationality.

No.	Pos.	Nation	Player
2	DF	AZE	Rail Malikov (to (Turkey) Denizlispor)
3	DF	SRB	Nikola Valentić (to (Serbia) Jagodina)
4	MF	AZE	Amit Guluzade (to (Portugal) Atlético CP)
7	MF	RUS	Marat Izmailov (loan return to (Portugal) Porto)
8	MF	AZE	Nizami Hajiyev (to (Azerbaijan) Inter Baku)
13	MF	AZE	Seymur Asadov (loan to (Azerbaijan) AZAL)
14	MF	NED	Lorenzo Ebecilio (loan to (Russia) Mordovia Saransk)
15	DF	GUI	Oumar Kalabane
17	MF	AZE	Nuran Gurbanov (to (Azerbaijan) Baku)
18	MF	SEN	Ibrahima Niasse (to (Russia) Mordovia Saransk)
19	FW	NGA	Abdulwaheed Afolabi (to (Moldova) Saxan Gagauz Yeri)
21	MF	AZE	Elmar Bakhshiev (Retired)
22	MF	BRA	Lourival Assis (to (Brazil) Bragantino)
25	GK	BRA	Diego (to (Portugal) Moreirense)
27	GK	POL	Dawid Pietrzkiewicz
31	FW	SUI	Danijel Subotić (to (Kuwait) Qadsia)
36	DF	AZE	Elnur Allahverdiyev (to (Azerbaijan) Neftchi Baku)
42	MF	BRA	Leonardo (to (Russia) Anzhi Makhachkala)
46	DF	TJK	Davron Ergashev (to (Kazakhstan) Zhetysu)
—	DF	ROU	Cristian Pulhac (to (Poland) Zawisza Bydgoszcz)
—	MF	AZE	Tarzin Jahangirov (loan extended at (Azerbaijan) Sumgayit)
—	FW	AZE	Amil Yunanov (to (Azerbaijan) Ravan Baku)

=== Inter Baku ===
In: Note: Flags indicate national team as defined under FIFA eligibility rules; some limited exceptions apply. Players may hold more than one non-FIFA nationality.

No.	Pos.	Nation	Player
5	DF	GEO	Aleksandr Amisulashvili (from (Russia) Krylia Sovetov)
9	MF	AZE	Mirzaga Huseynpur (from (Azerbaijan) Sumgayit)
10	MF	AZE	Elvin Mammadov (from (Azerbaijan) Baku)
12	FW	BRA	Nildo (from (Azerbaijan) Khazar Lankaran)
17	MF	AZE	Magomed Mirzabekov (from (Azerbaijan) Sumgayit)
80	MF	AZE	Nizami Hajiyev (from (Azerbaijan) Gabala)

Out: Note: Flags indicate national team as defined under FIFA eligibility rules; some limited exceptions apply. Players may hold more than one non-FIFA nationality.

No.	Pos.	Nation	Player
6	MF	AZE	Samir Zargarov (to (Azerbaijan) Simurq)
7	DF	AZE	Ruslan Amirjanov (to (Azerbaijan) Gabala)
9	FW	GEO	Alexander Iashvili (Retired)
12	MF	CZE	Ivo Táborský (loan return to (Czech Republic) Teplice)
20	DF	CGO	Bruce Abdoulaye (to (France) US Orléans)
64	DF	AZE	Elhad Naziri (to (Azerbaijan) Araz-Naxçıvan)
70	FW	AZE	Vagif Javadov (to (Turkey) Gaziantep B.B.)
77	MF	BRA	Flávio (to (Montenegro) Budućnost Podgorica)
87	DF	AZE	Jamal Hajiyev (to (Azerbaijan) Sumgayit)
—	MF	AZE	Asif Mirili (to (Azerbaijan) AZAL)

=== Khazar Lankaran ===
In: Note: Flags indicate national team as defined under FIFA eligibility rules; some limited exceptions apply. Players may hold more than one non-FIFA nationality.

No.	Pos.	Nation	Player
6	MF	AZE	Rashad Sadiqov (from (Azerbaijan) Neftchi Baku)
8	MF	BUL	Galin Ivanov (from (Bulgaria) Slavia Sofia)
9	MF	AZE	Uğur Pamuk (loan return from (Azerbaijan) Sumgayit)
11	FW	AZE	Rauf Aliyev (from (Azerbaijan) Baku)
12	GK	AZE	Jahangir Hasanzade (from (Azerbaijan) AZAL)
13	DF	AZE	Aleksandr Shemonayev (from (Azerbaijan) AZAL)
22	MF	AZE	Afran Ismayilov (from (Azerbaijan) Baku)
28	MF	BRA	Fernando Gabriel (from (Brazil) Paraná)
63	MF	SLE	Alfred Sankoh (from (Turkey) Şanlıurfaspor)

Out: Note: Flags indicate national team as defined under FIFA eligibility rules; some limited exceptions apply. Players may hold more than one non-FIFA nationality.

No.	Pos.	Nation	Player
2	DF	AZE	Slavik Alkhasov (to (Azerbaijan) Neftchi Baku)
4	DF	ESP	Álvaro Silva (to (Kuwait) Qadsia)
7	FW	CMR	Mbilla Etame (to (Turkey) Samsunspor)
9	FW	AZE	Orkhan Aliyev (loan to (Azerbaijan) Sumgayit)
11	MF	MAR	Zouhir Benouahi (to (Morocco) Olympic Safi)
12	FW	BRA	Nildo (to (Azerbaijan) Inter Baku)
16	MF	ROU	Adrian Piț (to (Romania) Viitorul Constanța)
22	MF	BRA	Deyvid Sacconi (to (Brazil) ABC)
23	MF	MKD	Nikola Gligorov (to (North Macedonia) FK Vardar)
30	MF	BRA	Elias

=== Neftchi Baku ===
In: Note: Flags indicate national team as defined under FIFA eligibility rules; some limited exceptions apply. Players may hold more than one non-FIFA nationality.

No.	Pos.	Nation	Player
10	MF	SLE	Julius Wobay (loan return from (United Arab Emirates) Al-Shaab CSC)
11	FW	CHI	Nicolás Canales (from (Chile) Colo-Colo)
12	GK	AZE	Emil Balayev (loan return from (Azerbaijan) Araz-Naxçıvan)
14	DF	AZE	Elnur Allahverdiyev (from (Azerbaijan) Gabala)
15	MF	PAR	Éric Ramos (from (Paraguay) Rubio Ñu, previously on loan)
17	MF	AZE	Nijat Gurbanov (loan return from (Azerbaijan) Simurq)
18	MF	BRA	Cauê (from (Romania) FC Vaslui)
—	DF	AZE	Slavik Alkhasov (from (Azerbaijan) Khazar Lankaran)

Out: Note: Flags indicate national team as defined under FIFA eligibility rules; some limited exceptions apply. Players may hold more than one non-FIFA nationality.

No.	Pos.	Nation	Player
4	DF	AZE	Tärlän Quliyev (to (Azerbaijan) Qarabağ)
5	DF	MKD	Igor Mitreski (Retired)
6	MF	AZE	Rashad Sadiqov (to (Azerbaijan) Khazar Lankaran)
11	FW	NED	Melvin Platje (Released, previously on loan to (Sweden) Kalmar)
13	MF	AZE	Vasif Aliyev
14	FW	UZB	Bahodir Nasimov (to (Iran) Padideh)
22	DF	AZE	Mahir Shukurov (to (Turkey) Karşıyaka)
25	MF	AZE	Javid Imamverdiyev (to (Turkey) Elazigspor)

=== Qarabağ ===
In: Note: Flags indicate national team as defined under FIFA eligibility rules; some limited exceptions apply. Players may hold more than one non-FIFA nationality.

No.	Pos.	Nation	Player
3	DF	AZE	Tärlän Quliyev (from (Azerbaijan) Neftchi Baku)
11	FW	BRA	Danilo Dias (from (Portugal) Marítimo)
33	DF	AZE	Shahriyar Aliyev (from (Azerbaijan) Baku)
77	MF	AZE	Javid Tagiyev (from (Azerbaijan) AZAL)
99	FW	AZE	Namig Alasgarov (from (Azerbaijan) Baku)
--	FW	SUI	Innocent Emeghara

Out: Note: Flags indicate national team as defined under FIFA eligibility rules; some limited exceptions apply. Players may hold more than one non-FIFA nationality.

No.	Pos.	Nation	Player
11	FW	CGO	Ulrich Kapolongo (to (Czech Republic) Teplice)
19	FW	GEO	Jaba Dvali (loan return to (Georgia (country)) Dinamo Tbilisi)
33	MF	AZE	Tamkin Khalilzade (loan to (Azerbaijan) AZAL)
44	DF	AZE	Eltun Yagublu (loan to (Azerbaijan) AZAL)
99	FW	GEO	Nikoloz Gelashvili (to (Georgia (country)) Zestafoni)

=== Simurq ===
In: Note: Flags indicate national team as defined under FIFA eligibility rules; some limited exceptions apply. Players may hold more than one non-FIFA nationality.

No.	Pos.	Nation	Player
3	DF	POL	Adam Banaś (from (Poland) Zagłębie Lubin)
5	DF	AZE	Vadim Abdullayev (from (Azerbaijan) Baku)
6	MF	AZE	Samir Zargarov (from (Azerbaijan) Inter Baku)
9	FW	CZE	Lukáš Třešňák (from (Czech Republic) Baumit Jablonec)
13	DF	AZE	Ali Gökdemir (from (Germany) Hannover 96)
14	FW	AZE	Vugar Mustafayev (from (Azerbaijan) Baku)
88	MF	SRB	Marko Stanojević (loan from (Moldova) Sheriff Tiraspol)

Out: Note: Flags indicate national team as defined under FIFA eligibility rules; some limited exceptions apply. Players may hold more than one non-FIFA nationality.

No.	Pos.	Nation	Player
3	DF	AZE	Nduka Usim
4	DF	BIH	Dilaver Zrnanović
5	DF	BRA	Anderson do Ó
6	MF	AZE	Tagim Novruzov (to (Azerbaijan) Sumgayit)
7	DF	AZE	Ruslan Poladov (to (Azerbaijan) Sumgayit)
9	MF	LTU	Mindaugas Kalonas (loan return to (Azerbaijan) Baku)
22	FW	MLI	Salif Ballo (to (Algeria) MO Béjaïa)
30	MF	ROU	Raul Costin (to (Romania) Universitatea Cluj)
77	FW	AZE	Nijat Gurbanov (loan return to (Azerbaijan) Neftchi Baku)

=== Sumgayit ===
In: Note: Flags indicate national team as defined under FIFA eligibility rules; some limited exceptions apply. Players may hold more than one non-FIFA nationality.

No.	Pos.	Nation	Player
5	DF	AZE	Agil Nabiyev (from (Azerbaijan) Ravan Baku)
6	MF	AZE	Tagim Novruzov (from (Azerbaijan) Simurq)
7	DF	AZE	Ruslan Poladov (from (Azerbaijan) Simurq)
9	FW	AZE	Orkhan Aliyev (loan from (Azerbaijan) Khazar Lankaran)
10	MF	AZE	Tarzin Jahangirov (loan extended from (Azerbaijan) Gabala)
11	FW	GER	Kiyan Soltanpour (from (Germany) Berliner AK)
17	MF	AZE	Ramazan Abbasov (from (Azerbaijan) Ravan Baku)
22	MF	AZE	Tofig Mikayilov (from (Azerbaijan) Ravan Baku)
45	MF	AZE	Murad Agayev (from (Azerbaijan) AZAL)
77	MF	RUS	Tavakkyul Mamedov (from (Russia) Torpedo Armavir)
—	DF	AZE	Jamal Hajiyev (from (Azerbaijan) Inter Baku)
—	FW	AZE	Farid Guliyev (from (Azerbaijan) Araz-Naxçıvan)

Out: Note: Flags indicate national team as defined under FIFA eligibility rules; some limited exceptions apply. Players may hold more than one non-FIFA nationality.

No.	Pos.	Nation	Player
4	DF	AZE	Samir Abbasov (Retired)
5	DF	AZE	Kamil Huseynov (to (Azerbaijan) Araz-Naxçıvan)
8	MF	AZE	Agshin Mukhtaroglu
10	MF	AZE	Uğur Pamuk (loan return to (Azerbaijan) Khazar Lankaran)
17	DF	RUS	Adil Ibragimov (to (Russia) SKChF Sevastopol)
19	MF	AZE	Magomed Mirzabekov (to (Azerbaijan) Inter Baku)
77	FW	AZE	Ramil Mansurov
88	MF	AZE	Mirzaga Huseynpur (to (Azerbaijan) Inter Baku)
95	FW	AZE	Ruslan Nasirli (to (Azerbaijan) Araz-Naxçıvan)
99	FW	AZE	Rahman Hajiyev (loan return to (Azerbaijan) Baku)
