= 2013–14 Gabala FC season =

Gabala
2013–14 season
- Chairman: Taleh Heydərov
- Manager: Yuri Semin
- Stadium: Gabala City Stadium
- Premier League: 3rd
- Azerbaijan Cup: Runners-up
- Top goalscorer: League: Danijel Subotić (12); All: Danijel Subotić (13)
- Highest home attendance: 2,800 vs. Qarabağ; 8 February 2014 vs. Khazar Lankaran; 15 February 2014
- Lowest home attendance: 500 vs. Ravan Baku; 20 September 2013 vs. Sumgayit; 25 October 2013
- Average home league attendance: 1,330
Home colours	Away colours

The 2013–14 season was Gabala's ninth season as a club and their eighth season in the Azerbaijan Premier League, the top flight of Azerbaijani football. They finished the season in their highest ever position, third, and earned qualification to the UEFA Europa League for the first time in the club's history. They also participated in the Azerbaijan Cup, reaching the final for the first time, where they lost to Neftchi Baku on penalties. It was their first, and only, season with manager Yuri Semin, who mutually terminated his contract at the end of the season. Danijel Subotić was the team's top goalscorer for the season with 13, 12 of which came in the Premier League.

== Season review ==
=== Preseason ===
On 29 May 2013 Yuri Semin was officially unveiled as the club's new manager, appointing recently retired ex-national team goalkeeper Dmitriy Kramarenko as one of his coaches.

=== Transfers ===
The summer transfer window saw a lot of transfer movement from Gabala, with 11 players joining the club and 15 players leaving the club. The most notable departures were January signings Luka Žinko to Hangzhou Greentown and Moustapha Dabo to Kahramanmaraşspor, whilst Ifeanyi Emeghara was released, Jeyhun Sultanov retired and Cristian Pulhac was told he was free to leave the club. Aleksandr Chertoganov, Vurğun Hüseynov and Anar Nazirov all joined Sumgayit, whilst Rashad Abdullayev also left the club after one season, joining Baku. Elnar Karimov, Yashar Abuzerov, Rovshan Amiraslanov, Daniel Cruz, Rey Mammadbayli and Amil Yunanov were the other players to leave the club.

Gabala's made their first two signings of the season in May, when Volodimir Levin and Nizami Hajiyev both from Inter Baku. In June Ibrahima Niasse followed from Inter Baku and Dawid Pietrzkiewicz from Simurq, whilst Lorenzo Ebecilio, on loan, and Abdulwaheed Afolabi joined from Metalurh Donetsk and Kuban Krasnodar respectively. Gabala added another three signings in July, with Rail Malikov moving from Denizlispor, Danijel Subotić from Volyn Lutsk and Leonardo from Metalurh Donetsk. Elnur Allahverdiyev signed with Gabala in September on an initial six-month-long loan deal after Rail Malikov was ruled out by injury.

=== August ===
Gabala started the season with 2 victories, a 2–1 away victory over Baku on 2 August and a 3–2 home victory Inter Baku on 10 August. Victor Mendy picked up the club's first goals of the season, netting twice in the game against Baku, whilst Leonardo, Volodimir Levin and Ibrahima Niasse all scored their first goals for the club since their summer moves in the victory over Inter Baku. Gabala lost their next games, 2–1 away to Sumgayit and 1–0 at home to Qarabağ, Yannick Kamanan scored Gabala's goal in these two games, and Levin was sent off in the defeat to Sumgayit after picking up two yellow cards. Gabala got back to winning ways in their last game of August, a 2–0 victory over Khazar Lankaran at home on 31 August, with Leonardo scoring his second for the club and Lorenzo Ebecilio his first.

=== September ===
After the international break, Gabala traveled to Baku to face AZAL on 15 September, and they picked up their 4th win of the season. AZAL took the lead in the 3rd minute with Will John scoring, but Mendy struck 5 minutes later to level the game. Danijel Subotić, playing his first game for the club after his registration issues were sorted out during the break, scored what turned out to be the winner in the 32nd minute before Amit Guluzade picked up Gabala's second red card of the season for two bookings. Gabala recorded their 5th win, and moved top of the league for the first time in their history, on 20 September, defeating Ravan Baku at home. Subotić scored his second in two appearances in the 8th minute before Levin double the lead 2 minutes later and Leonardo finished off the scoring in the second half. Gabala's last game of September was a 0–0 draw away to Simurq, who played the majority of the game with 10 men following Ilkin Qirtimov's first half red card.

=== October ===
Gabala's first game of October was on 4 October at home to Neftchi Baku, and was the last game before the international break. Gabala took the lead in the 7th minute through Lorenzo Ebecilio, before Mahir Shukurov equalised and Rashad Sadiqov scored the winner. On 19 October 2013, Gabala returned from the international break with an away trip to Inter Baku, a game which they won 1-0 thanks to a Danijel Subotić first half goal. Gabala followed this up with another victory on 25 October against Sumgayit, winning the game 2–0 with the goals coming from Danijel Subotić in the first half and Dodô in the second.

=== November ===
On 3 November Gabala traveled to face Qarabağ in Baku. Gabala went 4-0 down to Qarabağ, after a Nikoloz Gelashvili brace and goals apiece from Vüqar Nadirov and Chumbinho, before scoring three themselves in 15mins to ensure a close last 5 minutes. Gabala's goals came from Lorenzo Ebecilio, Leonardo and Dodô. Gabala's second game of November was a 0–0 away draw against Khazar Lankaran, which kept them third in the table. On 22 November, Gabala faced AZAL at home, and recorded their 8th win of the season as a second half Leonardo goal gave them a 1–0 win. At the end of November, Oumar Kalabane suffered a meniscus tear at his knee during training and underwent surgery at Acibadem Fulya Hospital. Gabala won their final game of November, a 1–0 away victory over Ravan Baku on 29 November 2013, with the goal coming from Yannick Kamanan.

=== December ===
Gabala started December with a 2–1 win over Mil-Muğan in the Azerbaijan Cup, with the goals coming from Leonardo and Abdulwaheed Afolabi, his first goal for the club. Gabala's next game was on 8 December against Simurq, which ended as a 2–1 victory to Gabala after Danijel Subotić scored an injury time winner following his early goal and Amit Guluzade scored an own goal for Simurq. Gabala suffered their fifth defeat of the season on 15 December away to Neftchi Baku. Neftchi took the lead through a 12th minute Araz Abdullayev penalty after Flavinho had been fouled, with Leonardo leveling things up in first half stoppage time from the penalty spot. Mushfig Teymurov was sent off for Gabala after collecting two yellow cards, before Mahir Shukurov scored an injury time free-kick to seal the victory for Neftchi. On 18 December, Diego underwent surgery for a knee injury sustained during training the previous week. Gabala's last game before the winter break, and the last in the first round of 19 matches, was on 20 December at home to Baku. Gabala won the game 2–0 with goals from Danijel Subotić and Lorenzo Ebecilio, two go 2nd in the table.

=== January transfers ===
On 23 December, it was announced that Gabala had signed Ruslan Tagizade from AZAL on a two-year contract, whilst defenders Shahriyar Khalilov and Dejan Kelhar all left the club and Tarzin Jahangirov joined Simurq on loan. On 30 December 2013, Gabala announced that they had agreed to sign Rafael Santos, who left Arsenal Kyiv following their bankruptcy in November, on a two-year contract subject to completing medical. On 6 January 2014, Santos completed his move to Gabala. On 8 January, Elnur Allahverdiyev made his move to Gabala permanent, signing a one-year deal. On 13 January, Anar Nazirov resigned for Gabala from Sumgayit on a one-year contract. On 26 January, Gabala revealed that Davron Ergashev had signed on a six-month contract from Zhetysu following a successful trial period. It also came to light that Cristian Pulhac was still at the club after refusing to terminate his contract and was currently training with the youth team. On 31 January, Gabala signed Marat Izmailov on a six-month loan deal from F.C. Porto, and Kamran Agayev from Baku on an 18-month contract.

=== February ===
Gabala's first game of the 2014 was on 2 February away to Sumgayit, which they won 3-0 thanks to goals from Victor Mendy, Lorenzo Ebecilio and Leonardo, to return to the top of the league. On 8 February Gabala dropped off the top of the table after a 0–1 home defeat to Qarabağ, this was followed up with another defeat on 15 February at home to Khazar Lankaran. Gabala got back to winning ways on 19 February despite going 1-0 down to a Nedo Turkovic penalty before Danijel Subotić scored his tenth of the season and a Shahriyar Rahimov gave Gabala a 2–1 away win over AZAL. Gabala's next two games were 0-0 draws against Ravan Baku and Simurq.

=== March ===
On 9 March Gabala faced Neftchi Baku at home in a game that ended 1–2 to Neftchi, with Gabala's goal coming from Lorenzo Ebecilio. Gabala's next game was a 0–0 draw on 12 March against Qarabağ in the Cup, before they drew 1–1 against FK Baku 4 days later in the league. Gabala progressed to the Semi-Finals of the cup on 19 March winning 2–1 in the second leg of their quarter-final match against Qarabağ, thanks to goals from Danijel Subotić and Victor Mendy. On 23 March Gabala were beaten 4–1 at home by Inter Baku, Victor Mendy scoring their only goal whilst they slipped out of the European places for the first time since week 5 of the season. On 25 March 2014, Bakhshiev announced that he would be retiring at the end of the 2013–14 season. Gabala suffered their second defeat in a row, and third in four games, on 30 March, losing 3–0 away to Qarabağ in a game that saw Elnur Allahverdiyev sent off.

=== April ===
Gabala lost their first game of April, going down 1–0 away to Khazar Lankaran on 5 April. Gabala's next game was on 12 April, which they drew 0–0 at home to AZAL to earn only their 4th point in eight games. On 15 April Sumin released Yannick Kamanan from his contract that was due to expire at the end of the season. The next day Gabala defeated Khazar Lankaran 3–0 in the first leg of their Azerbaijan Cup Semi-final, with Nizami Hajiyev scoring a bracing and Victor Mendy scoring the other. Gabala followed that win up with a 2–1 away victory over Ravan Baku on 20 April, Mendy scoring again with Gabalas other goal coming from Urfan Abbasov, his first for the club. Gabala went on to seal a place in the Azerbaijan Cup Final on 24 April, with a 1–1 draw in the second leg of against Khazar Lankaran, after Mendy scored his third goal in three games. Gabala's last game of April was a 1–0 home win over Simurq on the 27th, Dodô grabbing the only goal.

=== May ===
Gabala started May as they finished April, with a 2–1 away victory over Neftchi Baku. Javid Imamverdiyev gave Neftchi the lead in the 50th minute, with Dodô equalising in the 62nd minute before Lorenzo Ebecilio scored the winner in the 90th minute, and getting sent off for two yellow cards in stoppage time. On 7 May Gabala beat Baku 3–1 to go back into 3rd in the table. The goals came from Marat Izmailov, Mushfig Teymurov and Danijel Subotić, with Izmailov's and Teymurov's goals being their first for the club. Gabala drew their penultimate league game on 12 May against Inter Baku 0-0. On the last day of the League season, Gabala started in fourth place, 1 point behind Neftchi Baku. Gabala came from behind to beat Sumgayit 3–1, Magomed Kurbanov scoring for Sumgayit before Victor Mendy, Lorenzo Ebecilio and Abdulwaheed Afolabi scored to give Gabala the win that moved them into third place after Neftchi Baku drew 0–0 at Simurq. Gabala finished the season by playing in the Azerbaijan Cup Final against Neftchi Baku. Marat Izmailov scored Gabala's only goal to cancel out Samir Masimovs early strike to send the game into extra-time, and then to penalties, of which Gabala missed three of their five and Neftchi scored three of their four.

== Transfers ==
=== Summer ===
In: Note: Flags indicate national team as defined under FIFA eligibility rules; some limited exceptions apply. Players may hold more than one non-FIFA nationality.

No.	Pos.	Nation	Player
2	DF	AZE	Rail Malikov (from (Turkey) Denizlispor)
6	DF	AZE	Volodimir Levin (from (Azerbaijan) Inter Baku)
8	MF	AZE	Nizami Hajiyev (from (Azerbaijan) Inter Baku)
14	MF	NED	Lorenzo Ebecilio (loan from (Ukraine) Metalurh Donetsk)
17	MF	AZE	Nuran Gurbanov (loan return from (Azerbaijan) Ravan Baku)
18	MF	SEN	Ibrahima Niasse (from (Azerbaijan) Inter Baku)
19	FW	NGR	Abdulwaheed Afolabi (from (Russia) Kuban Krasnodar)
27	GK	POL	Dawid Pietrzkiewicz (from (Azerbaijan) Simurq)
31	FW	SUI	Danijel Subotić (from (Ukraine) Volyn Lutsk)
36	DF	AZE	Elnur Allahverdiyev (loan from (Azerbaijan) Khazar Lankaran)
42	MF	BRA	Leonardo (from (Ukraine) Metalurh Donetsk)

Out: Note: Flags indicate national team as defined under FIFA eligibility rules; some limited exceptions apply. Players may hold more than one non-FIFA nationality.

No.	Pos.	Nation	Player
1	GK	AZE	Elnar Karimov
3	DF	AZE	Vurğun Hüseynov (to (Azerbaijan) Sumgayit)
5	MF	SLO	Luka Žinko (to (China) Hangzhou Greentown)
7	MF	AZE	Yashar Abuzerov
14	FW	SEN	Moustapha Dabo (to (Turkey) Kahramanmaraşspor)
16	DF	NGR	Ifeanyi Emeghara
18	MF	AZE	Aleksandr Chertoganov (to (Azerbaijan) Sumgayit)
19	MF	AZE	Rovshan Amiraslanov (to (Azerbaijan) Simurq)
26	DF	BRA	Daniel Cruz
27	MF	AZE	Rashad Abdullayev (to (Azerbaijan) Baku)
30	GK	AZE	Anar Nazirov (to (Azerbaijan) Sumgayit)
38	FW	AZE	Rey Mammadbayli (to (Azerbaijan) AZAL)
90	MF	AZE	Jeyhun Sultanov (Retired)
99	FW	AZE	Amil Yunanov (loan to (Azerbaijan) Neftchala)

=== Winter ===
In: Note: Flags indicate national team as defined under FIFA eligibility rules; some limited exceptions apply. Players may hold more than one non-FIFA nationality.

No.	Pos.	Nation	Player
1	GK	AZE	Kamran Agayev (from (Azerbaijan) Baku)
7	MF	RUS	Marat Izmailov (loan from (Portugal) F.C. Porto)
16	MF	AZE	Ruslan Tagizade (from (Azerbaijan) AZAL)
36	DF	AZE	Elnur Allahverdiyev (from (Azerbaijan) Khazar Lankaran)
30	GK	AZE	Anar Nazirov (from (Azerbaijan) Sumgayit)
44	DF	BRA	Rafael Santos (from (Ukraine) Arsenal Kyiv)
46	DF	TJK	Davron Ergashev (from (Kazakhstan) Zhetysu)

Out: Note: Flags indicate national team as defined under FIFA eligibility rules; some limited exceptions apply. Players may hold more than one non-FIFA nationality.

No.	Pos.	Nation	Player
7	MF	AZE	Tarzin Jahangirov (loan to (Azerbaijan) Sumgayit)
11	FW	FRA	Yannick Kamanan
23	DF	AZE	Shahriyar Khalilov (to (Azerbaijan) Sumgayit)
84	DF	SLO	Dejan Kelhar (to (Serbia) Red Star Belgrade)

== Squad ==
As of match played 22 May 2014

No.	Name	Nationality	Position	Date of birth (age (Note: Age as of the end of the season))	Signed from	Signed in	Contract ends	Apps.	Goals
Goalkeepers
1	Kamran Agayev	(Azerbaijan)	GK	9 February 1986 (aged 28)	Baku	2014	2015	20	0
25	Diego	(Brazil)	GK	11 May 1979 (aged 35)	(Portugal) Vitória	2012	2014	27	0
27	Dawid Pietrzkiewicz	(Poland)	GK	9 February 1988 (aged 26)	Simurq	2013	2014	10	0
30	Anar Nazirov	(Azerbaijan)	GK	8 September 1985 (aged 28)	Sumgayit	2014	2016	23	0
55	Javidan Huseynzadeh	(Azerbaijan)	GK	7 March 1991 (aged 23)	Trainee	2013		1	0
Defenders
2	Rail Malikov	(Azerbaijan)	CB	18 December 1985 (aged 28)	(Turkey) Denizlispor	2013	2014	12	0
3	Nikola Valentić	(Serbia)	LB	6 September 1983 (aged 30)	(Serbia) Jagodina	2013	2014	27	0
5	Sadig Guliyev	(Azerbaijan)	CB	9 March 1995 (aged 19)	Trainee	2012		5	0
6	Volodimir Levin	(Azerbaijan)	CB	23 January 1984 (aged 30)	Inter Baku	2013	2015	28	2
15	Oumar Kalabane	(Guinea)	CB	1 August 1987 (aged 26)	(United Arab Emirates) Al Dhafra	2012	2014	32	2
34	Urfan Abbasov	(Azerbaijan)	CB	14 October 1992 (aged 21)	Qarabağ	2011		67	1
36	Elnur Allahverdiyev	(Azerbaijan)	CB	2 January 1983 (aged 31)	Khazar Lankaran	2013	2015	24	0
44	Rafael Santos	(Brazil)	CB	10 November 1984 (aged 29)	(Ukraine) Arsenal Kyiv	2014	2016	18	0
45	Murad Musayev	(Azerbaijan)	CB	13 June 1994 (aged 19)	Trainee	2012		2	0
46	Davron Ergashev	(Tajikistan)	CB	19 March 1988 (aged 26)	(Kazakhstan) Zhetysu	2014	2014	13	0
	Cristian Pulhac	(Romania)	CB	17 August 1984 (aged 29)	(Romania) Dinamo București	2013	2015	12	0
Midfielders
4	Amit Guluzade	(Azerbaijan)	MF	20 November 1992 (aged 21)	Ravan Baku	2013	2014	24	0
7	Marat Izmailov	(Russia)	MF	21 September 1982 (aged 31)	loan from (Portugal) F.C. Porto	2014	2014	18	2
8	Nizami Hajiyev	(Azerbaijan)	MF	8 February 1988 (aged 26)	Inter Baku	2013	2014	34	2
13	Seymur Asadov	(Azerbaijan)	MF	5 May 1994 (aged 20)	Trainee	2011		1	0
14	Lorenzo Ebecilio	(Netherlands)	MF	24 September 1991 (aged 22)	loan from (Ukraine) Metalurh Donetsk	2013	2014	37	8
16	Ruslan Tagizade	(Azerbaijan)	MF	9 December 1993 (aged 20)	AZAL	2014	2016	19	0
17	Nuran Gurbanov	(Azerbaijan)	ST	10 August 1993 (aged 20)	MOIK Baku	2011		14	0
18	Ibrahima Niasse	(Senegal)	MF	18 April 1988 (aged 26)	Inter Baku	2013	2014	35	1
20	Rashid Amiraslanov	(Azerbaijan)	MF	4 May 1992 (aged 22)	Trainee	2012		1	0
21	Elmar Bakhshiev	(Azerbaijan)	MF	3 August 1980 (aged 33)	Neftchi Baku	2012		28	0
22	Lourival Assis	(Brazil)	MF	3 February 1984 (aged 30)	(Bulgaria) Chernomorets Burgas	2012	2015	44	6
33	Elvin Jamalov	(Azerbaijan)	MF	4 February 1995 (aged 19)	Trainee	2013		2	0
37	Kamal Mirzayev	(Azerbaijan)	MF	14 September 1994 (aged 19)	Trainee	2012		5	0
42	Leonardo	(Brazil)	MF	18 March 1992 (aged 22)	(Ukraine) Metalurh Donetsk	2013	2014	33	8
88	Mushfig Teymurov	(Azerbaijan)	MF	15 January 1993 (aged 21)	Trainee	2009		16	1
Forwards
9	Victor Mendy	(Senegal)	ST	22 December 1981 (aged 32)	(Turkey) Bucaspor	2011		97	25
10	Dodô	(Brazil)	ST	16 October 1987 (aged 26)	(Croatia) Lokomotiva	2011		107	18
19	Abdulwaheed Afolabi	(Nigeria)	ST	8 December 1991 (aged 22)	(Russia) Kuban Krasnodar	2013	2014	26	2
31	Danijel Subotić	(Switzerland)	ST	31 January 1989 (aged 25)	(Ukraine) Volyn Lutsk	2013	2014	35	13

== Competitions ==
=== Friendlies ===
2 July 2013	Azerbaijan Select	1–2	(Azerbaijan) Gabala	Azerbaijan
AZST (UTC+5)	Goal	Summary	Kamanan; Dodô

3 July 2013	Metalurh Zaporizhya (Ukraine)	1–1	(Azerbaijan) Gabala	Turkey
AZST (UTC+5)	Goal	Summary; Video	Hajiyev 30'

7 July 2013	Trabzonspor (Turkey)	2–0	(Azerbaijan) Gabala	Turkey
AZST (UTC+5)		Summary

10 July 2013	Spartaspor (Turkey)	0–7	(Azerbaijan) Gabala	Turkey
20:00 AZST (UTC+5)		Summary	Kamanan; Kelhar; N.Gurbanov; Assis

13 July 2013	Antalyaspor (Turkey)	2–2	(Azerbaijan) Gabala	Turkey
AZST (UTC+5)	Yıldırım 23'; Tita 51'	Summary	Ebecilio 25', 56'

20 July 2013	Gabala (Azerbaijan)	Postponed	Salzburg, Austria
AZST (UTC+5)		Summary

23 July 2013	Gabala (Azerbaijan)	3–1	(Turkey) Gençlerbirliği	Munich, Germany
21:00 AZST (UTC+5)	Ebecilio 41' (pen.); Subotić 54' (pen.); Leonardo 60'	Summary	Görgülü 76'	Stadium: Hans-Bayer Stadion

25 July 2013	Gabala (Azerbaijan)	3–0	(Hungary) Zalaegerszegi	Salzburg, Austria
20:00 AZST (UTC+5)	T.Jahangirov 20'; Dodô 28'; Leonardo 42'	Summary

27 July 2013	Gabala (Azerbaijan)	2–1	(Slovenia) Šmartno	Salzburg, Austria
AZST (UTC+5)	Leonardo 27', 70' (pen.)	Summary	41'

10 January 2014	Gabala (Azerbaijan)	1–1	(Turkey) Malatyaspor	Antalya, Turkey
18:00 AZT (UTC+4)	Kamanan 25'	Summary	89'

13 January 2014	Gabala (Azerbaijan)	2–1	(Kazakhstan) Tobol	Antalya, Turkey
AZT (UTC+4)	Subotić 18'; Mendy 23'	Summary	Volkov 90'

16 January 2014	Gabala (Azerbaijan)	2–4	(Turkey) Konyaspor	Antalya, Turkey
AZT (UTC+4)	Santos 9'; Kamanan 31'	Summary	Kabze 37', 53'; Djalma 43'; Þorvaldsson 70'

20 January 2014	Gabala (Azerbaijan)	1–1	(Kazakhstan) Spartak Semey	Antalya, Turkey
AZT (UTC+4)	Leonardo 66' (pen.)	Summary

22 January 2014	Gabala (Azerbaijan)	0–0	(Russia) Volga Nizhny Novgorod	Antalya, Turkey
19:00 AZT (UTC+4)		Summary

25 January 2014	Gabala (Azerbaijan)	Cancelled	(Russia) Torpedo Moscow	Antalya, Turkey
AZT (UTC+4)		Summary

=== Azerbaijan Premier League ===
==== Results summary ====
Overall								Home						Away					
Pld	W	D	L	GF	GA	GD	Pts	W	D	L	GF	GA	GD	W	D	L	GF	GA	GD
36	18	7	11	48	36	+12	61	10	2	6	27	18	+9	8	5	5	21	18	+3

Last updated: 17 May 2014.
Source: Soccerway

==== Results by round ====
Round	1	2	3	4	5	6	7	8	9	10	11	12	13	14	15	16	17	18	19	20	21	22	23	24	25	26	27	28	29	30	31	32	33	34	35	36
Ground	A	H	A	H	H	A	H	A	H	A	H	A	A	H	A	H	A	H	A	H	H	A	H	A	H	A	H	A	A	H	A	H	A	H	A	H
Result	W	W	L	L	W	W	W	D	L	W	W	L	D	W	W	W	L	W	W	L	L	W	D	D	L	D	L	L	L	D	W	W	W	W	D	W
Position	3	3	3	4	4	3	1	1	3	3	2	3	3	3	3	2	3	2	1	3	3	2	2	2	2	3	5	5	5	5	5	4	4	3	4	3

Source: Soccerway
A = Away; H = Home; W = Win; D = Draw; L = Loss

==== Results ====
2 August 2013 1	Baku	1–2	Gabala	Baku
18:30 AZST (UTC+5)	Kalonas 12'; Nabiyev (yellow card) 20'	Summary	Mendy 61', 81'; Leonardo (yellow card) 70'	Stadium: Tofik Bakhramov Stadium; Attendance: 1,000; Referee: Fariz Yusifov

10 August 2013 2	Gabala	3–2	Inter Baku	Qabala
18:00 AZST (UTC+5)	Leonardo 54' (pen.); Levin 69'; Niasse 83'	Summary	Georgievski 20'; Iashvili (yellow card) 55'; Abdoulaye (yellow card) 67'; Javadov 90+1'; Mammadov (yellow card) 90+2'	Stadium: Gabala City Stadium; Attendance: 1,100; Referee: Aliyar Aghayev

19 August 2013 3	Sumgayit	2–1	Gabala	Sumgayit
18:00 AZST (UTC+5)	Asgarov 4'; Novruzov (yellow card) 30'; R.Gurbanov 62' (pen.)	Summary	Kamanan 14'; Levin (yellow card) 51' (yellow-red card) 61'; Leonardo (yellow card) 64'; Malikov (yellow card) 81'; Ebecilio (yellow card) 87'; Hajiyev (yellow card) 90+4'	Stadium: Mehdi Huseynzade Stadium; Attendance: 6,000; Referee: Orkhan Mämmädov

25 August 2013 4	Gabala	0–1	Qarabağ	Qabala
18:00 AZST (UTC+5)	Malikov (yellow card) 7'; Guluzade (yellow card) 43'; Ebecilio (yellow card) 68'	Summary	Nadirov 16' (yellow card) 68'; Garayev (yellow card) 59'; Veliyev (yellow card) 61'; Kapolongo (yellow card) 68'	Stadium: Gabala City Stadium; Attendance: 2,000; Referee: Aliyar Aghayev

31 August 2013 5	Gabala	2–0	Khazar Lankaran	Qabala
18:00 AZST (UTC+5)	Leonardo 39' (yellow card) 66'; Ebecilio 61' (yellow card) 66'; Valentić (yellow card) 81'	Summary		Stadium: Gabala City Stadium; Attendance: 1,200; Referee: Vusal Äliyev

15 September 2013 6	AZAL	1–2	Gabala	Baku
18:00 AZST (UTC+5)	John 3'; Barlay (yellow card) 19'; Kļava (yellow card) 46'; Tagizade (yellow card) 55'; Shemonayev (yellow card) 80'; Bogdanović (yellow card) 90+2'	Summary	Mendy 8'; Subotić 32'; Guluzade (yellow card) 22' (yellow-red card) 50'	Stadium: AZAL Arena; Attendance: 1,500; Referee: Aliyar Aghayev

20 September 2013 7	Gabala	3–0	Ravan Baku	Qabala
17:00 AZST (UTC+5)	Subotić 8'; Levin 10'; Leonardo 52' (pen.)	Summary	Savankulov (yellow card) 52'; Mammadov (yellow card) 56'; Balokog (yellow card) 65'; Torres (yellow card) 66'	Stadium: Gabala City Stadium; Attendance: 500; Referee: Rahim Hasanov

29 September 2013 8	Simurq	0–0	Gabala	Zaqatala
18:00 AZST (UTC+5)	Qirtimov (red card) 36'; R.Eyyubov (yellow card) 52'; Anderson do Ó (yellow card) 66'	Summary		Stadium: Zaqatala City Stadium; Attendance: 600; Referee: Fariz Yusifov

4 October 2013 9	Gabala	1–2	Neftchi Baku	Qabala
16:00 AZST (UTC+5)	Ebecilio 7'; Guluzade (yellow card) 19'	Summary	Shukurov 20' (pen.) (yellow card) 21'; Bertucci (yellow card) 38'; Sadiqov 56'; Cardoso (yellow card) 90+2'	Stadium: Gabala City Stadium; Attendance: 2,500; Referee: Rauf Jabbarov

19 October 2013 10	Inter Baku	0–1	Gabala	Baku
19:00 AZST (UTC+5)	Tskhadadze (yellow card) 23'; Dashdemirov (yellow card) 52'; Zargarov (yellow card) 90'	Summary	Niasse (yellow card) 25'; Subotić (yellow card) 39' (goal) 45+2'; Ebecilio (yellow card) 67'; Assis (yellow card) 87'; Diego (yellow card) 90+4'	Stadium: Shafa Stadium; Attendance: 3,000; Referee: Aliyar Aghayev

25 October 2013 11	Gabala	2–0	Sumgayit	Qabala
15:00 AZST (UTC+5)	Subotić 23'; Niasse (yellow card) 25'; Valentić (yellow card) 36'; Dodô 64'	Summary	Hasanalizade (yellow card) 9'; Ibragimov (yellow card) 37'; Fardjad-Azad (yellow card) 67'	Stadium: Gabala City Stadium; Attendance: Rahim Häsänov; Referee: 500

3 November 2013 12	Qarabağ	4–3	Gabala	Baku
17:00 AZT (UTC+4)	Gelashvili 26', 50'; Nadirov 37'; Chumbinho 65'; Reynaldo (yellow card) 90+1'	Summary	Levin (yellow card) 64'; Abbasov (yellow card) 66'; Ebecilio 72'; Leonardo 77'; Dodô 85'	Stadium: Tofiq Bahramov Stadium^{1} Attendance: 1,000; Referee: Aliyar Aghayev

10 November 2013 13	Khazar Lankaran	0–0	Gabala	Lankaran
18:00 AZT (UTC+4)		Summary	Valentić (yellow card) 23'; Dodô (yellow card) 36'; Hajiyev (yellow card) 90'	Stadium: Lankaran City Stadium; Attendance: 4,000; Referee: Vusal Äliyev

22 November 2013 14	Gabala	1–0	AZAL	Qabala
14:20 AZST (UTC+5)	Dodô (yellow card) 36'; Mendy (yellow card) 65'; Leonardo 72' (yellow card) 82'	Summary	Igbekoi (yellow card) 34'	Stadium: Gabala City Stadium; Attendance: 1,000; Referee: Fariz Yusifov

29 November 2013 15	Ravan Baku	0–1	Gabala	Baku
19:00 AZT (UTC+4)	Pecha (yellow card) 14'; Abdullayev (yellow card) 69' (yellow-red card) 85'	Summary	Kamanan 26' (yellow card) 70'	Stadium: Bayil Stadium; Attendance: 250; Referee: Vusal Äliyev

8 December 2013 16	Gabala	2–1	Simurq	Qabala
14:00 AZT (UTC+4)	Niasse (yellow card) 34'; Levin (yellow card) 45'; Allahverdiyev (yellow card) 45+2'; Subotić 52', 90+3' (yellow card) 90+3'	Summary	Guluzade 64' (o.g.); Ćeran (yellow card) 66'; Anderson do Ó (yellow card) 86'; Gurbanov (yellow card) 89'	Stadium: Gabala City Stadium; Attendance: 1,500; Referee: Rahim Hasanov

15 December 2013 17	Neftchi Baku	2–1	Gabala	Baku
18:00 AZT (UTC+4)	Shukurov (yellow card) 5' (goal) 90+4'; Abdullayev 12' (pen.); Sadiqov (yellow card) 32'; Cardoso (yellow card) 45+1'; Guliyev (yellow card) 72'	Summary	Leonardo 45+1' (pen.); Teymurov (yellow card) 11' (yellow-red card) 84'; Afolabi (yellow card) 74'; Guluzade (yellow card) 90+3'	Stadium: Bakcell Arena; Attendance: 800; Referee: Aliyar Aghayev

20 December 2013 18	Gabala	2–0	Baku	Qabala
13:00 AZT (UTC+4)	Guluzade (yellow card) 18'; Subotić 20' (yellow card) 47'; Allahverdiyev (yellow card) 42'; Pietrzkiewicz (yellow card) 83'; Ebecilio (yellow card) 85' (goal) 90+3'	Summary	Noguera (yellow card) 38'; S.Aliyev (yellow card) 54' (yellow-red card) 90+2'; Etto (yellow card) 63'; Rubén (yellow card) 76'	Stadium: Gabala City Stadium; Attendance: 1,500; Referee: Fariz Yusifov

2 February 2014 19	Sumgayit	0–3	Gabala	Baku
14:30 AZT (UTC+4)	Fardjad-Azad (yellow card) 11'	Summary	Mendy 3'; Gurbanov (yellow card) 49'; Ebecilio 55'; Leonardo 57'	Stadium: Bayil Stadium; Attendance: 100; Referee: Rahim Hasanov

8 February 2014 20	Gabala	0–1	Qarabağ	Qabala
14:30 AZT (UTC+4)	Dodô (yellow card) 14'; Allahverdiyev (yellow card) 79'	Summary	Sadygov (yellow card) 30'; Reynaldo (yellow card) 50' (goal) 74'; Šehić (yellow card) 90+3'; Gurbanov (yellow card) 81'	Stadium: Gabala City Stadium; Attendance: 2,800; Referee: Aliyar Aghayev

15 February 2014 21	Gabala	2–3	Khazar Lankaran	Qabala
15:00 AZT (UTC+4)	Subotić 26', 65'; Niasse (yellow card) 36'; Tagizade (yellow card) 45'	Summary	Sadio 51'; Etame 56', 84'; Blaževski (yellow card) 62'; Scarlatache (yellow card) 78'	Stadium: Gabala City Stadium; Attendance: 2,800; Referee: Vusal Äliyev

19 February 2014 22	AZAL	1–2	Gabala	Baku
15:00 AZT (UTC+4)	N.Turković 39' (pen.); Barlay (yellow card) 45+1'; Rahimov (yellow card) 69'	Summary	Subotić 44'; Hajiyev (yellow card) 45'; Rahimov 71' (o.g.)	Stadium: AZAL Arena; Attendance: 500; Referee: Rahim Häsänov

23 February 2014 23	Gabala	0–0	Ravan Baku	Qabala
13:00 AZT (UTC+4)	Leonardo (yellow card) 56'; Allahverdiyev (yellow card) 65'; Subotić (yellow card) 81'; Tagizade (yellow card) 87'	Summary	Mörec (yellow card) 21'; Maharramov (yellow card) 42'; O.Lalayev (yellow card) 54' júlio César (yellow card) 70'; Marković (yellow card) 72'; Sapela (red card) 74'; Mammadov (yellow card) 74'; Bayramov (yellow card) 90+4'	Stadium: Gabala City Stadium; Attendance: 1,500; Referee: Elvin Äsgärov

28 February 2014 24	Simurq	0–0	Gabala	Zaqatala
15:00 AZT (UTC+4)	Gurbanov (yellow card) 39'; Lambot (yellow card) 58'; Anderson do Ó (yellow card) 90'	Summary	Dodô (yellow card) 90+1'	Stadium: Zaqatala City Stadium; Attendance: 2,700; Referee: Aliyar Aghayev

9 March 2014 25	Gabala	1–2	Neftchi Baku	Qabala
13:00 AZT (UTC+4)	Valentić (yellow card) 6'; Ebecilio 68' (yellow card) 90+2'	Summary	Nasimov 29', 64'; Shukurov (yellow card) 82'	Stadium: Gabala City Stadium; Attendance: 2,000; Referee: Fariz Yusifov

16 March 2014 26	Baku	1–1	Gabala	Baku
14:00 AZT (UTC+4)	Horvat (yellow card) 35'; E.Mammadov 90+1'	Summary	Allahverdiyev (yellow card) 65'; Rafael Santos (yellow card) 73'; Subotić 80' (yellow card) 90'	Stadium: Tofik Bakhramov Stadium; Attendance: 600; Referee: Aliyar Aghayev

23 March 2014 27	Gabala	1–4	Inter Baku	Qabala
15:00 AZT (UTC+4)	Allahverdiyev (yellow card) 41'; Teymurov (yellow card) 62'; Izmailov (yellow card) 65'; Mendy 89'	Summary	Tskhadadze 14'; A.Abatsiyev (yellow card) 46'; Álvaro 46', 54'; Špičić 57'; Abdoulaye (yellow card) 74'	Stadium: Gabala City Stadium; Attendance: 2,000; Referee: Rauf Jabbarov

30 March 2014 28	Qarabağ	3–0	Gabala	Baku
18:00 AZST (UTC+5)	Chumbinho 48'; Reynaldo 65', 87'; Gurbanov (yellow card) 66'	Summary	Abbasov (yellow card) 35'; Mendy (yellow card) 38'; Allahverdiyev (yellow card) 76' (yellow-red card) 78'	Stadium: Tofiq Bahramov Stadium^{1} Attendance: 300; Referee: Rahim Häsänov

5 April 2014 29	Khazar Lankaran	1–0	Gabala	Lankaran
18:00 AZST (UTC+5)	Gligorov (yellow card) 31'; Etame 71'; Ramaldanov (yellow card) 31'	Summary	Ebecilio (yellow card) 14'; Abbasov (yellow card) 28'; R.Tagizade (yellow card) 84'; Kamanan (yellow card) 90+3'	Stadium: Lankaran City Stadium; Attendance: 2,500; Referee: Rauf Jabbarov

12 April 2014 30	Gabala	0–0	AZAL	Qabala
15:00 AZST (UTC+5)	Izmailov (yellow card) 59'	Summary	K.Diniyev (yellow card) 56'; Barlay (yellow card) 66'; V.Igbekoi (yellow card) 78'; Aílton Júnior (yellow card) 84'; A.Shemonayev (yellow card) 90'; L.Kasradze (yellow card) 90+2'	Stadium: Gabala City Stadium; Attendance: 500; Referee: Fariz Yusifov

20 April 2014 31	Ravan Baku	1–2	Gabala	Baku
17:00 AZST (UTC+5)	Adamović (yellow card) 66'; Y.Ağakärimzadä 85'	Summary	Mendy 38'; Abbasov 41'; Subotić (yellow card) 44'; Niasse (yellow card) 48'	Stadium: Bakcell Arena; Attendance: 300; Referee: Vusal Äliyev

27 April 2014 32	Gabala	1–0	Simurq	Qabala
16:00 AZST (UTC+5)	Dodô 57' (yellow card) 62'; Subotić (yellow card) 90+4'	Summary	Qirtimov (yellow card) 58'	Stadium: Gabala City Stadium; Attendance: 2,000; Referee: Omar Paşayev

2 May 2014 33	Neftchi Baku	1–2	Gabala	Baku
17:00 AZST (UTC+5)	Yunuszade (yellow card) 38'; Imamverdiyev 50'; T.Guliyev (yellow card) 68'	Summary	Abbasov (yellow card) 33'; Dodô 63'; Ebecilio 90' (yellow card) 90+1' (yellow-red card) 90+3'	Stadium: Bakcell Arena; Attendance: 2,000; Referee: Aliyar Aghayev

7 May 2014 34	Gabala	3–1	Baku	Qabala
17:00 AZST (UTC+5)	Izmailov 15'; M.Teymurov 27' (yellow card) 27'; Subotić 57'	Summary	Mario (yellow card) 39'; Alasgarov 65'; Travner (yellow card) 90'	Stadium: Gabala City Stadium; Attendance: 2,000; Referee: Rahim Häsänov

12 May 2014 35	Inter Baku	0–0	Gabala	Baku
18:00 AZST (UTC+5)	D.Meza (yellow card) 73'; J.Diniyev (yellow card) 90+1'	Summary	Allahverdiyev (yellow card) 30'	Stadium: Shafa Stadium; Attendance: 1,000; Referee: Fariz Yusifov

17 May 2014 36	Gabala	3–1	Sumgayit	Qabala
17:00 AZST (UTC+5)	R.Tagizade (yellow card) 26'; Mendy 39'; Dodô (yellow card) 47'; Afolabi (yellow card) 69' (goal) 90+1'; Ebecilio 86' (yellow card) 87'; Agayev (yellow card) 90+1'	Summary	Kurbanov 7'; Mammadov (yellow card) 71'; Hüseynov (yellow card) 80'; Ibragimov (yellow card) 82'	Stadium: Gabala City Stadium; Attendance: 2,000; Referee: Elvin Äsgärov

==== League table ====
Pos	Team	Pld	W	D	L	GF	GA	GD	Pts	Qualification or relegation
1	Qarabağ (C)	36	21	9	6	65	21	+44	72	Qualification for Champions League second qualifying round
2	Inter Baku	36	20	7	9	60	37	+23	67	Qualification for Europa League first qualifying round
3	Gabala	36	18	7	11	48	36	+12	61	Qualification for Europa League first qualifying round
4	Neftçi Baku	36	17	9	10	47	43	+4	60	Qualification for Europa League second qualifying round
5	Baku	36	16	9	11	53	43	+10	57	

Source: Azerbaijan Professional Football league
Rules for classification: 1) points; 2) goal difference; 3) number of goals scored.
(C) Champions

=== Azerbaijan Cup ===
4 December 2013 Second Round	Mil-Muğan	1–2	Gabala	Qabala
13:00 AZT (UTC+4)	E.Mammadov 1'; C.Hasanov (red card) 11'; Z. Mamedov (yellow card) 67'; E.Mammadov (yellow card) 68'; S.Babaev (yellow card) 69'; Mr.Hajiyev (yellow card) 75'	Summary	Leonardo 15' (pen.) (yellow card) 71'; Afolabi 18'; Ebecilio (yellow card) 36'; Kamanan (yellow card) 69'; Guluzade (yellow card) 75'	Stadium: Gabala City Stadium; Attendance: 500; Referee: Elvin Äsgärov

12 March 2014 Quarterfinals 1st leg	Gabala	0–0	Qarabağ	Qabala
14:30 AZT (UTC+4)	Dodô (yellow card) 87'	Summary	Medvedev (yellow card) 32'	Stadium: Gabala City Stadium; Attendance: 1,200; Referee: Rahim Häsänov

19 March 2014 Quarterfinals 2nd leg	Qarabağ	1–2 (1–2 agg.)	Gabala	Baku
17:00 AZT (UTC+4)	Reynaldo 61'; Medvedev (yellow card) 70'; Nadirov (yellow card) 90+2'	Summary	Subotić 45+1'; Dodô (yellow card) 54'; Izmailov (yellow card) 54'; Mendy 82'; Nazirov (yellow card) 90+1'; Ebecilio (yellow card) 90+2'	Stadium: Tofiq Bahramov Stadium^{1} Attendance: 2,000; Referee: Rahim Häsänov

16 April 2014 Semifinals 1st leg	Gabala	3–0	Khazar Lankaran	Qabala
16:00 AZST (UTC+5)	Hajiyev 53', 71'; Mendy 59'	Summary		Stadium: Gabala City Stadium; Attendance: 2,000; Referee: Rahim Häsänov

24 April 2014 Semifinals 2nd leg	Khazar Lankaran	1–1 (1–4 agg.)	Gabala	Lankaran
19:00 AZST (UTC+5)	Nildo 54'	Summary	Mendy 23'	Stadium: Lankaran City Stadium; Attendance: 5,000; Referee: Rahim Häsänov

22 May 2014 Final	Neftchi Baku	1–1 (a.e.t.) (3–2 p)	Gabala	Baku
20:00 AZST (UTC+5)	Masimov 52'	Summary	Izmailov 71'	Stadium: Tofiq Bahramov Stadium; Attendance: 22,000; Referee: Aliyar Aghayev
	Penalties
	Ramos (penalty scored); Flavinho (penalty scored); Denis (penalty missed); Bruno (penalty scored)		Izmailov (penalty missed); Santos (penalty missed); Assis (penalty scored); Hajiyev (penalty scored); Niasse (penalty missed)

== Squad statistics ==
As of Match played 22 May 2014

=== Appearances and goals ===
No.	Pos	Nat	Player	Total		Premier League		Azerbaijan Cup	
No.	Pos	Nat	Player	Apps	Goals	Apps	Goals	Apps	Goals
1	GK	(Azerbaijan) AZE	Kamran Agayev	20	0	16+0	0	4+0	0
2	DF	(Azerbaijan) AZE	Rail Malikov	12	0	9+1	0	1+1	0
3	DF	(Serbia) SRB	Nikola Valentić	17	0	11+4	0	2+0	0
4	MF	(Azerbaijan) AZE	Amit Guluzade	15	0	13+1	0	0+1	0
5	DF	(Azerbaijan) AZE	Sadig Guliyev	4	0	3+0	0	1+0	0
6	DF	(Azerbaijan) AZE	Volodimir Levin	28	2	25+0	2	3+0	0
7	MF	(Russia) RUS	Marat Izmailov	18	2	11+3	1	4+0	1
8	MF	(Azerbaijan) AZE	Nizami Hajiyev	34	2	20+9	0	4+1	2
9	FW	(Senegal) SEN	Victor Mendy	41	10	26+9	7	6+0	3
10	FW	(Brazil) BRA	Dodô	40	4	33+2	4	5+0	0
14	MF	(Netherlands) NED	Lorenzo Ebecilio	36	8	28+3	8	5+0	0
15	DF	(Guinea) GUI	Oumar Kalabane	3	0	3+0	0	0+0	0
16	MF	(Azerbaijan) AZE	Ruslan Tagizade	19	0	11+3	0	5+0	0
17	MF	(Azerbaijan) AZE	Nuran Gurbanov	5	0	2+3	0	0+0	0
18	MF	(Senegal) SEN	Ibrahima Niasse	35	1	26+3	1	6+0	0
19	FW	(Nigeria) NGR	Abdulwaheed Afolabi	26	2	1+21	1	1+3	1
22	MF	(Brazil) BRA	Lourival Assis	14	0	2+7	0	0+5	0
25	GK	(Brazil) BRA	Diego	9	0	9+0	0	0+0	0
27	GK	(Poland) POL	Dawid Pietrzkiewicz	10	0	10+0	0	0+0	0
30	GK	(Azerbaijan) AZE	Anar Nazirov	2	0	1+0	0	1+0	0
31	FW	(Switzerland) SUI	Danijel Subotić	35	13	27+2	12	4+2	1
33	MF	(Azerbaijan) AZE	Elvin Jamalov	2	0	1+0	0	1+0	0
34	DF	(Azerbaijan) AZE	Urfan Abbasov	23	1	18+3	1	2+0	0
36	DF	(Azerbaijan) AZE	Elnur Allahverdiyev	24	0	22+2	0	0+0	0
42	MF	(Brazil) BRA	Leonardo	33	8	24+7	7	1+1	1
44	DF	(Brazil) BRA	Rafael Santos	18	0	15+0	0	3+0	0
45	DF	(Azerbaijan) AZE	Murad Musayev	1	0	0+0	0	0+1	0
46	DF	(Tajikistan) TJK	Davron Ergashev	13	0	7+2	0	4+0	0
55	GK	(Azerbaijan) AZE	Javidan Huseynzadeh	1	0	0+0	0	1+0	0
88	MF	(Azerbaijan) AZE	Mushfig Teymurov	12	1	8+2	1	2+0	0
Players away from Gabala on loan:
7	MF	(Azerbaijan) AZE	Tarzin Jahangirov	1	0	0+1	0	0+0	0
Players who appeared for Gabala no longer at the club:
11	FW	(France) FRA	Yannick Kamanan	19	2	13+5	2	0+1	0
84	DF	(Slovenia) SLO	Dejan Kelhar	7	0	2+5	0	0+0	0

=== Goal scorers ===
Place	Position	Nation	Number	Name	Premier League	Azerbaijan Cup	Total
1	FW	(Switzerland)	31	Danijel Subotić	12	1	13
2	FW	(Senegal)	9	Victor Mendy	7	3	10
3	MF	(Netherlands)	14	Lorenzo Ebecilio	8	0	8
3	MF	(Brazil)	42	Leonardo	7	1	8
5	FW	(Brazil)	10	Dodô	4	0	4
6	DF	(Azerbaijan)	6	Volodimir Levin	2	0	2
6	FW	(France)	11	Yannick Kamanan	2	0	2
6	FW	(Nigeria)	19	Abdulwaheed Afolabi	1	1	2
6	MF	(Russia)	7	Marat Izmailov	1	1	2
6	MF	(Azerbaijan)	8	Nizami Hajiyev	0	2	2
11	MF	(Senegal)	18	Ibrahima Niasse	1	0	1
11	DF	(Azerbaijan)	34	Urfan Abbasov	1	0	1
11	MF	(Azerbaijan)	88	Mushfig Teymurov	1	0	1
11				Own goal	1	0	1
				TOTALS	48	9	57

=== Disciplinary record ===
Number	Nation	Position	Name	Premier League		Azerbaijan Cup		Total	
Number	Nation	Position	Name	Yellow card	Red card	Yellow card	Red card	Yellow card	Red card
1	(Azerbaijan)	GK	Kamran Agayev	1	0	1	0	2	0
2	(Azerbaijan)	DF	Rail Malikov	2	0	1	0	3	0
3	(Serbia)	DF	Nikola Valentić	4	0	0	0	4	0
4	(Azerbaijan)	MF	Amit Guluzade	6	1	1	0	7	1
6	(Azerbaijan)	DF	Volodimir Levin	4	1	0	0	4	1
7	(Russia)	MF	Marat Izmailov	2	0	2	0	4	0
8	(Azerbaijan)	MF	Nizami Hajiyev	3	0	1	0	4	0
9	(Senegal)	FW	Victor Mendy	2	0	0	0	2	0
10	(Brazil)	FW	Dodô	6	0	2	0	8	0
14	(Netherlands)	MF	Lorenzo Ebecilio	10	1	2	0	12	1
16	(Azerbaijan)	MF	Ruslan Tagizade	4	0	1	0	5	0
17	(Azerbaijan)	MF	Nuran Gurbanov	1	0	0	0	1	0
18	(Senegal)	MF	Ibrahima Niasse	5	0	0	0	5	0
19	(Nigeria)	FW	Abdulwaheed Afolabi	2	0	0	0	2	0
22	(Brazil)	MF	Lourival Assis	1	0	0	0	1	0
25	(Brazil)	GK	Diego	1	0	0	0	1	0
27	(Poland)	GK	Dawid Pietrzkiewicz	1	0	0	0	1	0
30	(Azerbaijan)	GK	Anar Nazirov	0	0	1	0	1	0
31	(Switzerland)	FW	Danijel Subotić	7	0	1	0	8	0
34	(Azerbaijan)	DF	Urfan Abbasov	5	0	1	0	6	0
36	(Azerbaijan)	DF	Elnur Allahverdiyev	9	1	0	0	9	1
42	(Brazil)	MF	Leonardo	5	0	1	0	6	0
44	(Brazil)	DF	Rafael Santos	1	0	1	0	2	0
46	(Tajikistan)	DF	Davron Ergashev	0	0	2	0	2	0
88	(Azerbaijan)	MF	Mushfig Teymurov	4	1	0	0	4	1
Players who left Gabala during the season:
11	(France)	FW	Yannick Kamanan	2	0	1	0	3	0
			TOTALS	88	5	20	0	108	5

== Notes ==
- Qarabağ have played their home games at the Tofiq Bahramov Stadium since 1993 due to the ongoing situation in Quzanlı.
