= List of Azerbaijan football transfers summer 2013 =

This is a list of Azerbaijan football transfers in the summer transfer window 2013 by club. Only clubs of the 2013–14 Azerbaijan Premier League are included.

== Azerbaijan Premier League 2013-14 ==
=== AZAL ===
In: Note: Flags indicate national team as defined under FIFA eligibility rules; some limited exceptions apply. Players may hold more than one non-FIFA nationality.

No.	Pos.	Nation	Player
3	DF	AZE	Aleksandr Shemonayev (from (Azerbaijan) Simurq)
5	MF	AZE	Murad Agayev (from (Azerbaijan) Sumgayit)
8	MF	AZE	Garib Ibrahimov (from (Azerbaijan) Simurq)
16	FW	SWE	Freddy Borg (from (Germany) SV Darmstadt 98)
18	MF	SLE	Samuel Barlay (from (Azerbaijan) Ravan Baku)
21	FW	AZE	Rey Mammadbayli (from (Azerbaijan) Gabala)
27	GK	AZE	Elmaddin Mammadov (from Youth Team)
28	MF	AZE	Emin Jafarguliyev (from (Azerbaijan) Sumgayit)
30	FW	UKR	Yuriy Fomenko (from (Azerbaijan) Inter Baku)
—	MF	AZE	Shahriyar Rahimov (from (Azerbaijan) Ravan Baku)

Out: Note: Flags indicate national team as defined under FIFA eligibility rules; some limited exceptions apply. Players may hold more than one non-FIFA nationality.

No.	Pos.	Nation	Player
1	GK	AZE	Amil Agajanov (to (Azerbaijan) Simurq)
3	DF	AZE	Nduka Usim (to (Turkey) Tavşanlı Linyitspor)
6	MF	AZE	Tagim Novruzov (to (Azerbaijan) Simurq)
8	MF	TKM	Elman Tagaýew (to (Turkmenistan) Aşgabat)
9	FW	AZE	Elshan Mammadov
10	MF	AZE	Tarlan Khalilov (to (Azerbaijan) Shusha)
11	MF	MAR	Zouhir Benouahi (to (Azerbaijan) Khazar Lankaran)
16	FW	BRA	Nildo (to (Azerbaijan) Khazar Lankaran)
19	MF	AZE	Orkhan Safiyaroglu (to (Azerbaijan) Simurq)
24	DF	UKR	Ruslan Zubkov
37	FW	LTU	Andrius Velička (to (Lithuania) Žalgiris Vilnius)
77	DF	AZE	Saşa Yunisoğlu (to (Azerbaijan) Sumgayit)

=== Baku ===
In: Note: Flags indicate national team as defined under FIFA eligibility rules; some limited exceptions apply. Players may hold more than one non-FIFA nationality.

No.	Pos.	Nation	Player
3	DF	SVN	Jure Travner (from (Slovenia) ND Mura 05)
4	DF	ESP	Mario (from (Spain) Real Betis)
5	DF	ESP	Rubén (from (Spain) Osasuna)
7	MF	AZE	Afran Ismayilov (from (Azerbaijan) Qarabağ)
12	MF	BRA	Etto (from (Greece) PAOK)
15	MF	ESP	Alberto Noguera (from (England) Blackpool)
20	MF	LTU	Mindaugas Kalonas (from (Azerbaijan) Ravan Baku)
24	DF	CYP	Giorgos Pelagias (from (Cyprus) Olympiakos Nicosia)
27	MF	AZE	Rashad Abdullayev (from (Azerbaijan) Gabala)
30	MF	AZE	Vugar Baybalayev (from (Azerbaijan) Turan Tovuz)

Out: Note: Flags indicate national team as defined under FIFA eligibility rules; some limited exceptions apply. Players may hold more than one non-FIFA nationality.

No.	Pos.	Nation	Player
2	DF	BOL	Edemir Rodríguez (to (Bolivia) Club Bolívar)
3	DF	LVA	Deniss Ivanovs
5	DF	AZE	Agil Nabiyev (to (Azerbaijan) Ravan Baku)
6	DF	SLE	Ibrahim Kargbo (to (Belgium) Brussels FC)
19	FW	AZE	Nurlan Novruzov (loan to (Azerbaijan) Sumgayit)
21	DF	AZE	Novruz Mammadov (to (Azerbaijan) Ravan Baku)
26	DF	AZE	Aziz Guliyev (loan to (Azerbaijan) Ravan Baku)
27	DF	GEO	George Popkhadze (to (Poland) Jagiellonia Białystok)
27	MF	AZE	Rashad Abdullayev (loan to (Azerbaijan) Ravan Baku)
28	FW	TUR	Ferdi Elmas
36	FW	CRC	Winston Parks (to (Costa Rica) Uruguay Coronado)

=== Gabala ===
In: Note: Flags indicate national team as defined under FIFA eligibility rules; some limited exceptions apply. Players may hold more than one non-FIFA nationality.

No.	Pos.	Nation	Player
1	GK	POL	Dawid Pietrzkiewicz (from (Azerbaijan) Simurq)
2	DF	AZE	Rail Malikov (from (Turkey) Denizlispor)
6	DF	AZE	Volodimir Levin (from (Azerbaijan) Inter Baku)
8	MF	AZE	Nizami Hajiyev (from (Azerbaijan) Inter Baku)
14	MF	NED	Lorenzo Ebecilio (from (Ukraine) Metalurh Donetsk)
17	MF	AZE	Nuran Gurbanov (loan return from (Azerbaijan) Ravan Baku)
18	MF	SEN	Ibrahima Niasse (from (Azerbaijan) Inter Baku)
19	FW	NGA	Abdulwaheed Afolabi (from (Russia) Kuban Krasnodar)
31	FW	SUI	Danijel Subotić (from (Ukraine) Volyn Lutsk)
36	DF	AZE	Elnur Allahverdiyev (loan from (Azerbaijan) Khazar Lankaran)
42	MF	BRA	Leonardo (from (Ukraine) Metalurh Donetsk)

Out: Note: Flags indicate national team as defined under FIFA eligibility rules; some limited exceptions apply. Players may hold more than one non-FIFA nationality.

No.	Pos.	Nation	Player
1	GK	AZE	Elnar Karimov
3	DF	AZE	Vurğun Hüseynov (to (Azerbaijan) Sumgayit)
5	MF	SVN	Luka Žinko (to (China) Hangzhou Greentown)
7	MF	AZE	Yashar Abuzerov
14	FW	SEN	Moustapha Dabo (to (Turkey) Kahramanmaraşspor)
16	DF	NGA	Ifeanyi Emeghara
18	MF	AZE	Aleksandr Chertoganov (to (Azerbaijan) Sumgayit)
19	MF	AZE	Rovshan Amiraslanov (to (Azerbaijan) Simurq)
26	DF	BRA	Daniel Cruz
27	MF	AZE	Rashad Abdullayev (to (Azerbaijan) Baku)
30	GK	AZE	Anar Nazirov (to (Azerbaijan) Sumgayit)
38	FW	AZE	Rey Mammadbayli (to (Azerbaijan) AZAL)
90	MF	AZE	Jeyhun Sultanov (Retired)
99	FW	AZE	Amil Yunanov (to (Azerbaijan) Turan-T)

=== Inter Baku ===
In: Note: Flags indicate national team as defined under FIFA eligibility rules; some limited exceptions apply. Players may hold more than one non-FIFA nationality.

No.	Pos.	Nation	Player
3	DF	GEO	Lasha Salukvadze (from (Russia) SKA-Energiya Khabarovsk)
4	DF	ESP	Iván Benítez (from (Cyprus) Nea Salamis)
8	MF	ESP	Mikel Álvaro (from (Georgia (country)) Dinamo Tbilisi)
9	FW	GEO	Alexander Iashvili (from (Germany) VfL Bochum)
15	DF	BRA	João Paulo (from (Brazil) Bragantino)
18	MF	PAR	César Meza (from (Italy) Cesena)
22	FW	MKD	Ilčo Naumoski (from (Austria) Mattersburg)
25	GK	AZE	Salahat Aghayev (loan return from (Azerbaijan) Sumgayit)
33	DF	CRO	Matija Špičić (from (Russia) Sibir Novosibirsk)
64	DF	AZE	Elhad Naziri (from (Azerbaijan) Ravan Baku)
70	FW	AZE	Vagif Javadov (from (Azerbaijan) Qarabağ)
77	FW	BRA	Flavio Beck (from (Montenegro) Budućnost Podgorica)
88	MF	PAR	David Meza (from (Italy) Cesena)
—	DF	AZE	Rustam Abasov (loan return from (Azerbaijan) Simurq)

Out: Note: Flags indicate national team as defined under FIFA eligibility rules; some limited exceptions apply. Players may hold more than one non-FIFA nationality.

No.	Pos.	Nation	Player
4	DF	GEO	Valeri Abramidze (to (Georgia (country)) Sioni Bolnisi)
8	MF	AZE	Nizami Hajiyev (to (Azerbaijan) Gabala)
10	FW	GEO	Georgi Adamia (to (Georgia (country)) Zestafoni)
14	MF	BUL	Petar Zlatinov (to (Bulgaria) Litex Lovech)
15	DF	AZE	Volodimir Levin (to (Azerbaijan) Gabala)
18	DF	GEO	Ilia Kandelaki (to (Georgia (country)) Zestafoni)
23	FW	POL	Tales Schütz (to Hong Kong Rangers)
25	MF	SEN	Ibrahima Niasse (to (Azerbaijan) Gabala)
30	FW	UKR	Yuriy Fomenko (to (Azerbaijan) AZAL)
74	GK	GEO	Revaz Tevdoradze (to (Georgia (country)) Chikhura Sachkhere)
91	FW	BRA	Leonardo Rocha (to (Brazil) Olaria)
—	DF	AZE	Rustam Abasov

=== Khazar Lankaran ===
In: Note: Flags indicate national team as defined under FIFA eligibility rules; some limited exceptions apply. Players may hold more than one non-FIFA nationality.

No.	Pos.	Nation	Player
6	DF	AZE	Rasim Ramaldanov (from (Azerbaijan) Simurq)
8	MF	ESP	Eduard Oriol (from (Spain) Real Zaragoza)
11	MF	MAR	Zouhir Benouahi (from (Azerbaijan) AZAL)
12	FW	BRA	Nildo (from (Azerbaijan) AZAL)
18	MF	AZE	Tural Jalilov (from (Azerbaijan) Ravan Baku)
20	FW	CMR	Mbilla Etame (from (Turkey) Adanaspor)
22	MF	BRA	Deyvid Sacconi (from (Brazil) Bragantino)
23	MF	MKD	Nikola Gligorov (from (Cyprus) Alki Larnaca)
25	GK	AZE	Tarlan Qasımzade (loan from (Azerbaijan) MOIK Baku)
33	GK	BRA	Douglas Leite (from (Brazil) Criciúma)
42	MF	AZE	Kamran Abdullazadeh (loan from (Azerbaijan) MOIK Baku)

Out: Note: Flags indicate national team as defined under FIFA eligibility rules; some limited exceptions apply. Players may hold more than one non-FIFA nationality.

No.	Pos.	Nation	Player
5	DF	AZE	Elnur Allahverdiyev (loan to (Azerbaijan) Gabala)
8	DF	BRA	Éder Bonfim
11	FW	GRE	Dimitris Sialmas (to (Greece) Platanias)
16	MF	ROU	Adrian Piț (resigned with Khazar)
24	FW	TUR	Gökhan Güleç (to (Turkey) İnegölspor)
30	GK	ESP	Toni Doblas
35	FW	ARG	Luciano Olguín (to (Argentina) Aldosivi)
99	MF	CRO	Marin Oršulić (to (Croatia) NK Zadar)

=== Neftchi Baku ===
In: Note: Flags indicate national team as defined under FIFA eligibility rules; some limited exceptions apply. Players may hold more than one non-FIFA nationality.

No.	Pos.	Nation	Player
1	GK	LVA	Pāvels Doroševs (from (Latvia) Liepājas Metalurgs)
2	DF	BRA	Carlos Cardoso (from (Brazil) Vitória)
11	FW	NED	Melvin Platje (from (Netherlands) NEC)
15	MF	PAR	Éric Ramos (loan extended from (Paraguay) Rubio Ñu)
17	MF	AZE	Nijat Gurbanov (loan return from (Azerbaijan) Simurq PFC)
90	FW	CMR	Ernest Nfor (from (Belgium) KV Kortrijk)
—	GK	AZE	Eyyub Aliyev (loan return from (Azerbaijan) Simurq)
—	DF	AZE	Slavik Alkhasov (loan return from (Azerbaijan) Sumgayit)
—	FW	AZE	Ruslan Qurbanov (loan return from (Azerbaijan) Sumgayit)

Out: Note: Flags indicate national team as defined under FIFA eligibility rules; some limited exceptions apply. Players may hold more than one non-FIFA nationality.

No.	Pos.	Nation	Player
2	MF	CHI	José Cabión (to (Chile) Rangers de Talca)
8	FW	AZE	Elshan Abdullayev (on loan to (Azerbaijan) Sumgayit)
10	MF	SLE	Julius Wobay (on loan to (United Arab Emirates) Al Shabab)
11	FW	CHI	Nicolás Canales (to (Chile) Colo-Colo)
17	MF	AZE	Nijat Gurbanov (on loan to (Azerbaijan) Simurq PFC)
20	DF	AZE	Slavik Alkhasov (on loan to (Azerbaijan) Sumgayit)
21	FW	AZE	Kamil Nurähmädov (to (Azerbaijan) Ravan Baku)
26	DF	AZE	Karim Diniyev (on loan to (Azerbaijan) Sumgayit)
29	FW	AZE	Ilham Allahverdiyev (on loan to (Azerbaijan) FK Qaradag)
—	GK	AZE	Rashad Azizli (on loan to (Azerbaijan) Simurq)
—	MF	AZE	Tanrıverdi Maharramli (loan to (Azerbaijan) Neftchala)
—	FW	AZE	Ruslan Qurbanov (on loan to (Azerbaijan) Sumgayit)

=== Qarabağ ===
In: Note: Flags indicate national team as defined under FIFA eligibility rules; some limited exceptions apply. Players may hold more than one non-FIFA nationality.

No.	Pos.	Nation	Player
11	FW	GEO	Nikoloz Gelashvili (from (Germany) VfL Bochum)
16	FW	NED	Leroy George (from (Netherlands) NEC)
19	FW	AZE	Murad Sattarly (loan return from (Azerbaijan) Simurq)
70	MF	BRA	Chumbinho (from (Greece) Olympiacos)
88	FW	CGO	Ulrich Kapolongo (from (Jordan) Shabab Al-Ordon)
—	GK	BIH	Ibrahim Šehić (from (Turkey) Mersin İdmanyurdu)
—	FW	AZE	Bakhtiyar Soltanov (loan return from (Azerbaijan) Simurq)

Out: Note: Flags indicate national team as defined under FIFA eligibility rules; some limited exceptions apply. Players may hold more than one non-FIFA nationality.

No.	Pos.	Nation	Player
3	DF	AZE	Kamil Huseynov (loan to (Azerbaijan) Neftchala FK)
4	DF	AZE	Zaur Hashimov (loan to (Azerbaijan) Sumgayit)
11	FW	AZE	Branimir Subašić (to (Turkey) Orduspor)
15	FW	NGA	Emeka Opara
16	FW	AZE	Elnur Abdulov (to (Azerbaijan) Ravan Baku)
19	MF	AZE	Emin Imamaliev (to (Azerbaijan) Araz)
19	FW	AZE	Murad Sattarly (on loan to (Azerbaijan) Simurq)
22	MF	AZE	Afran Ismayilov (to (Azerbaijan) Baku)
70	FW	AZE	Vagif Javadov (to (Azerbaijan) Inter Baku)
88	MF	ARG	Cristián Torres (to (Azerbaijan) Ravan Baku)
—	FW	AZE	Bakhtiyar Soltanov (to (Azerbaijan) Ravan Baku)

=== Ravan Baku ===
In: Note: Flags indicate national team as defined under FIFA eligibility rules; some limited exceptions apply. Players may hold more than one non-FIFA nationality.

No.	Pos.	Nation	Player
5	DF	AZE	Agil Nabiyev (from (Azerbaijan) Baku)
6	MF	AZE	Jeyhun Javadov
7	MF	AZE	Elvin Häsänäliyev (from (Azerbaijan) Kəpəz)
9	FW	AZE	Elnur Abdulov (from (Azerbaijan) Qarabağ)
10	FW	SWE	Sebastian Castro-Tello (loan from (Sweden) Hammarby)
11	FW	AZE	Kamil Nurähmädov (from (Azerbaijan) Neftchi Baku)
12	GK	AZE	Fuad Ahmadov
13	MF	AZE	Shahriyar Rahimov (to (Azerbaijan) AZAL)
18	FW	AZE	Bakhtiyar Soltanov (from (Azerbaijan) Qarabağ)
21	DF	AZE	Novruz Mammadov (from (Azerbaijan) Baku)
23	MF	ARG	Cristián Torres (from (Azerbaijan) Qarabağ)
27	MF	AZE	Rashad Abdullayev (loan from (Azerbaijan) Baku)
29	DF	AZE	Aziz Guliyev (loan from (Azerbaijan) Baku)
30	MF	AZE	Jamshid Maharramov (from (Azerbaijan) Kapaz)
33	DF	TJK	Sohib Savankulov (from (Tajikistan) Istiqlol Dushanbe)
35	MF	SWE	Fredrik Holster (from (Sweden) GIF Sundsvall)
38	DF	SVK	Ivan Pecha (from (Belarus) Neman Grodno)
40	MF	CMR	Michel Balokog (from (Slovenia) NK Domžale)
64	DF	AZE	Elhad Naziri (from (Romania) Petrolul Ploiești)
85	GK	AZE	Kamal Bayramov (from (Azerbaijan) Turan Tovuz)
—	DF	SVN	Jovan Vidović (from (Slovenia) Maribor)
—	FW	NGA	Kabiru Musa (from (Egypt) Al-Mokawloon Al-Arab)

Out: Note: Flags indicate national team as defined under FIFA eligibility rules; some limited exceptions apply. Players may hold more than one non-FIFA nationality.

No.	Pos.	Nation	Player
4	DF	AZE	Nodar Mammadov (to (Azerbaijan) Sumgayit)
5	DF	MDA	Nicolae Orlovschi (to (Moldova) Dacia Chișinău)
7	MF	AZE	Ramil Hashimzade
8	MF	AZE	Tural Akhundov (to (Azerbaijan) Simurq)
9	MF	AZE	Vusal Qarayev
10	MF	LTU	Mindaugas Kalonas (to (Azerbaijan) Baku)
12	GK	AZE	Davud Karimi (to (Turkey) Fethiyespor)
13	MF	AZE	Shahriyar Rahimov (to (Azerbaijan) AZAL)
15	MF	AZE	Tural Jalilov (to (Azerbaijan) Khazar Lankaran)
18	MF	SLE	Samuel Barlay (to (Azerbaijan) AZAL)
18	FW	AZE	Bakhtiyar Soltanov (to (Azerbaijan) Araz)
27	MF	AZE	Nuran Gurbanov (loan return to (Azerbaijan) Gabala)
28	MF	AZE	Emin Mustafayev
64	DF	AZE	Elhad Naziri (to (Azerbaijan) Inter Baku)
—	DF	SVN	Jovan Vidović (to (Germany) Wehen Wiesbaden)
—	FW	NGA	Kabiru Musa (to (Egypt) El Qanah)

=== Simurq ===
In: Note: Flags indicate national team as defined under FIFA eligibility rules; some limited exceptions apply. Players may hold more than one non-FIFA nationality.

No.	Pos.	Nation	Player
1	GK	POL	Paweł Kapsa (from (Cyprus) Olympiakos Nicosia)
6	MF	AZE	Tagim Novruzov (from (Azerbaijan) AZAL)
8	MF	KEN	Patrick Osiako (from (Israel) Hapoel Be'er Sheva)
9	FW	AZE	Rovshan Amiraslanov (from (Azerbaijan) Gabala)
11	FW	SRB	Dragan Ćeran (from (Israel) Maccabi Netanya)
16	DF	AZE	Maharram Huseynov (from (Azerbaijan) Kəpəz)
18	DF	AZE	Tural Akhundov (from (Azerbaijan) Ravan Baku)
19	MF	AZE	Orkhan Safiyaroglu (from (Azerbaijan) AZAL)
20	MF	ISR	Idan Weitzman (from (Israel) Bnei Sakhnin)
21	MF	AZE	Murad Sattarly (on loan from (Azerbaijan) Qarabağ)
22	FW	MLI	Salif Ballo (from (Azerbaijan) Turan Tovuz)
30	MF	ROU	Raul Costin (from (Romania) Vaslui)
35	GK	AZE	Amil Agajanov (from (Azerbaijan) AZAL)
77	MF	AZE	Nijat Gurbanov (on loan from (Azerbaijan) Neftchi Baku)
94	GK	AZE	Rashad Azizli (loan from (Azerbaijan) Neftchi Baku)

Out: Note: Flags indicate national team as defined under FIFA eligibility rules; some limited exceptions apply. Players may hold more than one non-FIFA nationality.

No.	Pos.	Nation	Player
1	GK	AZE	Dmitriy Kramarenko (Retired)
3	DF	AZE	Rasim Ramaldanov (to (Azerbaijan) Khazar Lankaran)
5	DF	AZE	Rustam Abasov (loan return to (Azerbaijan) Inter Baku)
8	MF	AZE	Garib Ibrahimov (to (Azerbaijan) AZAL)
9	MF	POL	Marcin Burkhardt (to (Poland) Miedz Legnica)
10	FW	CRO	Zdravko Popović (to (Greece) AEK Athens)
12	FW	CRO	Tomislav Bušić (to (Croatia) Solin)
13	DF	AZE	Aleksandr Shemonayev (to (Azerbaijan) AZAL)
18	FW	AZE	Gafar Gafarov
19	MF	AZE	Nijat Gurbanov (loan return to (Azerbaijan) Neftchi Baku)
21	FW	AZE	Murad Sattarly (loan return to (Azerbaijan) Qarabağ)
22	GK	POL	Dawid Pietrzkiewicz (to (Azerbaijan) Gabala)
24	MF	AZE	Mehman Mammadov
25	MF	BIH	Mario Božić (to (Greece) Panachaiki)
27	FW	AZE	Bakhtiyar Soltanov (loan return to (Azerbaijan) Qarabağ)
99	GK	AZE	Eyyub Aliyev (loan return to (Azerbaijan) Neftchi Baku)

=== Sumgayit ===
In: Note: Flags indicate national team as defined under FIFA eligibility rules; some limited exceptions apply. Players may hold more than one non-FIFA nationality.

No.	Pos.	Nation	Player
1	GK	AZE	Anar Nazirov (from (Azerbaijan) Gabala)
2	DF	AZE	Slavik Alkhasov (loan from (Azerbaijan) Neftchi Baku)
3	DF	AZE	Vurğun Hüseynov (from (Azerbaijan) Gabala)
5	DF	AZE	Karim Diniyev (loan from (Azerbaijan) Neftchi Baku)
10	FW	AZE	Ruslan Qurbanov (loan from (Azerbaijan) Neftchi Baku)
15	DF	AZE	Nodar Mammadov (from (Azerbaijan) Ravan Baku)
17	DF	RUS	Adil Ibragimov (from (Russia) Fakel Voronezh)
18	MF	AZE	Aleksandr Chertoganov (from (Azerbaijan) Gabala)
22	DF	AZE	Zaur Hashimov (from (Azerbaijan) Qarabağ)
27	FW	AZE	Nurlan Novruzov (loan from (Azerbaijan) Baku)
88	FW	AZE	Elshan Abdullayev (loan from (Azerbaijan) Neftchi Baku)
91	FW	AZE	Vugar Asgarov (from (Latvia) Liepājas Metalurgs)
—	MF	AZE	Budag Nasirov (frin (Azerbaijan) Turan Tovuz)
--	DF	AZE	Saşa Yunisoğlu (from (Azerbaijan) AZAL)

Out: Note: Flags indicate national team as defined under FIFA eligibility rules; some limited exceptions apply. Players may hold more than one non-FIFA nationality.

No.	Pos.	Nation	Player
1	GK	AZE	Salahat Aghayev (loan return to (Azerbaijan) Inter Baku)
2	DF	AZE	Slavik Alkhasov (loan return to (Azerbaijan) Neftchi Baku)
3	DF	GER	Murat Doymuş (to other (Germany) Viktoria 1889)
5	MF	AZE	Aftandil Hajiyev
6	MF	TUR	Taner Taktak (to (Turkey) Fethiyespor)
11	FW	AZE	Sabir Allahquliyev
13	MF	AZE	Murad Agayev (to (Azerbaijan) AZAL)
17	MF	AZE	Emin Jafarguliyev (to (Azerbaijan) AZAL)
22	DF	RUS	Khayal Mustafayev
50	FW	AZE	Murad Hüseynov (to (Serbia) Sloboda Užice)
76	MF	TUR	Can Akgün (to (Turkey) Bayrampaşaspor)
86	DF	AZE	Eldar Jankishiyev (loan return to (Russia) Anzhi Makhachkala)
91	FW	AZE	Ruslan Qurbanov (loan return to (Azerbaijan) Neftchi Baku)
--	DF	AZE	Saşa Yunisoğlu (to (Turkey) Denizlispor)
