= Demirer =

Demirer is a Turkish surname and may refer to:

- Ata Demirer (born 1972), Turkish filmmaker and stand-up comedian
- Mertcan Demirer (born 1993), Turkish professional footballer
- Rojda Demirer (born 1980), Turkish actress
