= Erol Kolcu =

Turkish footballer

Personal information
- Date of birth: 20 April 1962 (age 64)
- Place of birth: Sakarya, Turkey
- Position: Defender

Senior career*
Years	Team	Apps	(Gls)
1984–1987	Samsunspor		
1987–1991	Sakaryaspor		
1991–1993	Mersin İdman Yurdu		
1993–1994	Nevşehirspor		
1994–1996	Alanyaspor		

Managerial career
- 1999–2000: Diyarbakırspor (assistant)
- 2000–2002: Sakaryaspor (assistant)
- 2003–2005: Antalyaspor (assistant)
- 2006: Fethiyespor (assistant)
- 2006–2007: Bursaspor (assistant)
- 2007–2008: Karşıyaka (assistant)
- 2008: Kocaelispor (assistant)
- 2008–2009: Sakaryaspor (assistant)
- 2010–2011: Adana Demirspor (assistant)
- 2011: Tavşanlı Linyitspor (assistant)
- 2013–2014: Sakaryaspor
- 2018: Gaziantepspor (assistant)
- 2019: Tuzlaspor (assistant)
- * Club domestic league appearances and goals

Erol Kolcu (born 20 April 1962) is a retired Turkish football defender and later manager.
