= Metin Erol =

Turkish footballer

Personal information
- Date of birth: 24 January 1987 (age 39)
- Place of birth: İzmit, Turkey
- Height: 1.82 m (6 ft 0 in)
- Position: Goalkeeper

Team information
- Current team: Düzcespor
- Number: 41

Senior career*
Years	Team	Apps	(Gls)
2006–2011	Kocaelispor	65	(0)
2007	→ Gölcükspor (loan)	0	(0)
2007–2008	→ Orhangazi Gençlerbirliği SK (loan)	29	(0)
2011–2012	Kocaeli Birlik Spor	26	(0)
2012–2014	Tavşanlı Linyitspor	51	(0)
2014–2016	Fethiyespor	48	(0)
2016–2019	Ümraniyespor	12	(0)
2019	Giresunspor	11	(0)
2020–2021	Tuzlaspor	8	(0)
2021–2022	Ankaraspor	22	(0)
2023	Ankara Demirspor	1	(0)
2023–	Düzcespor	3	(0)
- * Club domestic league appearances and goals as of 23 September 2023

Metin Erol (born 24 January 1987) is a Turkish footballer who plays as a goalkeeper for Düzcespor.

== Career ==
Born in İzmit, Erol began playing youth football with Kocaelispor. He signed a professional contract in 2005, and would become Kocaelispor's starting goalkeeper by the 2010–11 season. Erol made two appearances in the Turkish Süper Lig for Kocaelispor before leaving the club in the summer of 2011.
