= TKİ Tavşanlı Linyitspor =

Turkish sports club

Tavşanlı Linyitspor
- Full name: TKİ Tavşanlı Linyitspor
- Founded: 1943
- Ground: Tavşanlı Ada Stadium; Tavşanlı, Turkey
- Capacity: 5,000
- Chairman: Mustafa Çokuslu
- Manager: Sertaç Gezer
- League: Turkish Regional Amateur League
Home colours	Away colours	Third colours

TKİ Tavşanlı Linyitspor is a Turkish sports club located in Tavşanlı, Kütahya Province. The football club was established in 1943. It plays in the Turkish Regional Amateur League. In 2009–2010 season of second league, they promoted to Bank Asya 1.Lig after play-off matches.

== Current squad ==
Note: Flags indicate national team as defined under FIFA eligibility rules; some limited exceptions apply. Players may hold more than one non-FIFA nationality.

No.	Pos.	Nation	Player
2	DF	TUR	Musa Dolu
4	DF	TUR	Kemal Canak
6	MF	TUR	Ahmet Topal
7	MF	TUR	Mertcan Demirer
9	FW	TUR	Abdi Aktas
10	MF	TUR	Mehmet Besler
11	MF	KGZ	Vadim Harchenko
14	DF	TUR	Hakan Çevik
15	MF	TUR	Soner Özdemir
19	MF	ARG	Luciano Guaycochea
21	MF	TUR	Ismail Aslan

No.	Pos.	Nation	Player
22	DF	TUR	Hasan Yasar
23	DF	TUR	Sakıb Aytaç
26	DF	TUR	Batuhan Tur
27	FW	TUR	Egecan Cevir
35	DF	TUR	Hasan Erbey
38	DF	TUR	Kemal Okyay
41	GK	TUR	Metin Erol
48	DF	TUR	Murat Özavci
77	FW	TUR	Ali Kucik
80	FW	NGA	Akeem Agbetu
99	FW	TUR	Özgürcan Özcan
—	DF	KGZ	Ilgar Nabiyev
