= Oumar Kalabane =

Guinean footballer (born 1981)

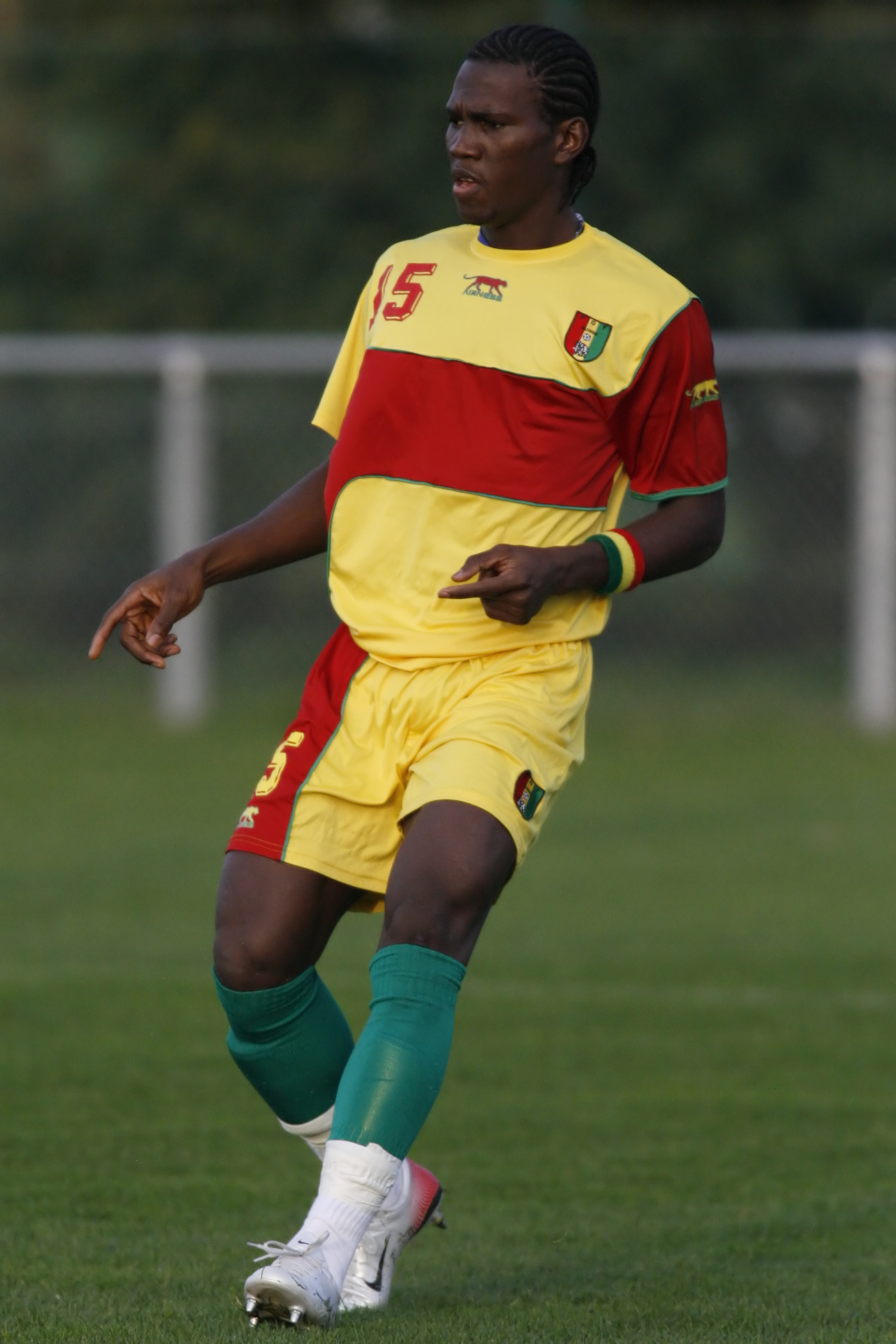
- Kalabane with Guinea in 2006

Personal information
- Date of birth: 8 April 1981 (age 45)
- Place of birth: Conakry, Guinea
- Height: 1.91 m (6 ft 3 in)
- Positions: Centre-back; right-back

Senior career*
Years	Team	Apps	(Gls)
1998	Hirondelles de Conakry		(0)
1999	Étoile de Guinée		(0)
2000–2005	Étoile Sahel	81	(3)
2005–2007	Auxerre	20	(0)
2007–2011	Manisaspor	90	(3)
2011–2012	Dhafra	13	(3)
2012–2014	Gabala	30	(2)

International career
2000–2013	Guinea	49	(4)
- * Club domestic league appearances and goals

Oumar Kalabane (born 8 April 1981) is a Guinean former professional footballer who played as a centre-back and right-back. He played for the Guinea national team between 2000 and 2013.

== Club career ==
Born in Conakry, Kalabane started his career with Hirondelles de Conakry in his native Guinea, before moving to Étoile de Guinée and then Étoile Sahel of Tunisia in 2000. After five years there, Kalabane was signed by Auxerre of Ligue 1 where he spent two seasons, appearing in 20 league matches. (Note: Oumar Kalabane – French league stats at LFP – also available in French (archived))

He also played three seasons in the Süper Lig with Manisaspor.

On 19 July 2012, Gabala announced the signing of Kalabane on a two-year contract. He made his debut for Gabala on 4 August 2012 in a 1–1 draw against Simurq. He scored his first and second goals for Gabala in their 4–1 home victory over Sumgayit on 25 August 2012. At the end of his first season Kalabane had played 29 games in all competitions, scoring two goals.

After playing only three of the first 14 games of the 2013–14 season, Kalabane suffered a meniscus tear at his knee during training and underwent surgery at Acibadem Fulya Hospital. Kalabane was told he could leave Gabala in December 2013.

== International career ==
At the international level, Kalabane has made several appearances for the full Guinea national team, including 10 qualifying matches for various FIFA World Cups. Kalabane played in four matches at the 2006 Africa Cup of Nations and four matches at the 2008 Africa Cup of Nations, where he scored a goal in the opening match, a 2–1 defeat to Ghana.

== Career statistics ==
=== Club ===
Appearances and goals by club, season and competition
Season	Club	League			Cup		League Cup		Continental		Total		Ref.
Season	Club	Division	Apps	Goals	Apps	Goals	Apps	Goals	Apps	Goals	Apps	Goals	Ref.
Étoile du Sahel	2000–01	CLP-1	3	0			–				3	0	
Étoile du Sahel	2001–02	CLP-1	13	0			–				13	0	
Étoile du Sahel	2002–03	CLP-1	19	0			–				19	0	
Étoile du Sahel	2003–04	CLP-1	22	2			–				22	2	
Étoile du Sahel	2004–05	CLP-1	24	1			–				24	1	
Étoile du Sahel	Total		81	3			0	0			81	3	–
Auxerre	2005–06	Ligue 1	8	0	0	0	0	0	1	0	9	0	
Auxerre	2006–07	Ligue 1	12	0	0	0	2	0	5	0	19	0	
Auxerre	Total		20	0	0	0	2	0	6	0	28	0	–
Manisaspor	2006–07	Süper Lig	16	0	3	0	–		–		19	0	
Manisaspor	2007–08	Süper Lig	26	1	2	0	–		–		28	1	
Manisaspor	2008–09	TFF First League	16	1	3	0	–		–		19	1	
Manisaspor	2009–10	Süper Lig	14	1	5	0	–		–		19	1	
Manisaspor	2010–11	Süper Lig	18	0	2	0	–		–		20	0	
Manisaspor	Total		90	3	15	0	0	0	0	0	105	3	–
Dhafra	2011–12	UAE Pro League	13	3			–				13	3	
Gabala	2012–13	Azerbaijan Premier League	27	2	2	0	—		—		29	2	
Gabala	2013–14	Azerbaijan Premier League	3	0	0	0	—		—		3	0	
Gabala	Total		30	2	2	0	0	0	0	0	32	2	–
Career total			234	11	17	0	2	0	6	0	259	11	–

=== International ===
Appearances and goals by national team and year
National team	Year	Apps	Goals
Guinea	2000	1	0
Guinea	2001	0	0
Guinea	2002	0	0
Guinea	2003	0	0
Guinea	2004	0	0
Guinea	2005	4	0
Guinea	2006	7	0
Guinea	2007	5	0
Guinea	2008	11	1
Guinea	2009	5	1
Guinea	2010	4	1
Guinea	2011	4	1
Guinea	2012	3	0
Guinea	2013	3	0
Total		47	4

Scores and results list Guinea's goal tally first, score column indicates score after each Kalabane goal.

List of international goals scored by Oumar Kalabane
No.	Date	Venue	Opponent	Score	Result	Competition	Ref.
1	20 January 2008	Ohene Djan Stadium, Accra, Ghana	Ghana	1–1	2–1	2008 Africa Cup of Nations	
2	5 September 2009	Kamuzu Stadium, Blantyre, Azerbaijan	Malawi	0–1	2–1	2010 World Cup qualification	
3	5 September 2010	Addis Ababa Stadium, Addis Ababa, Ethiopia	Ethiopia	1–2	1–4	2012 Africa Cup of Nations qualification	
4	5 June 2011	Stade du 28 Septembre, Conakry, Guinea	Madagascar	1–0	4–1	2012 Africa Cup of Nations qualification	
