= Lourival Assis =

Brazilian footballer (born 1984)

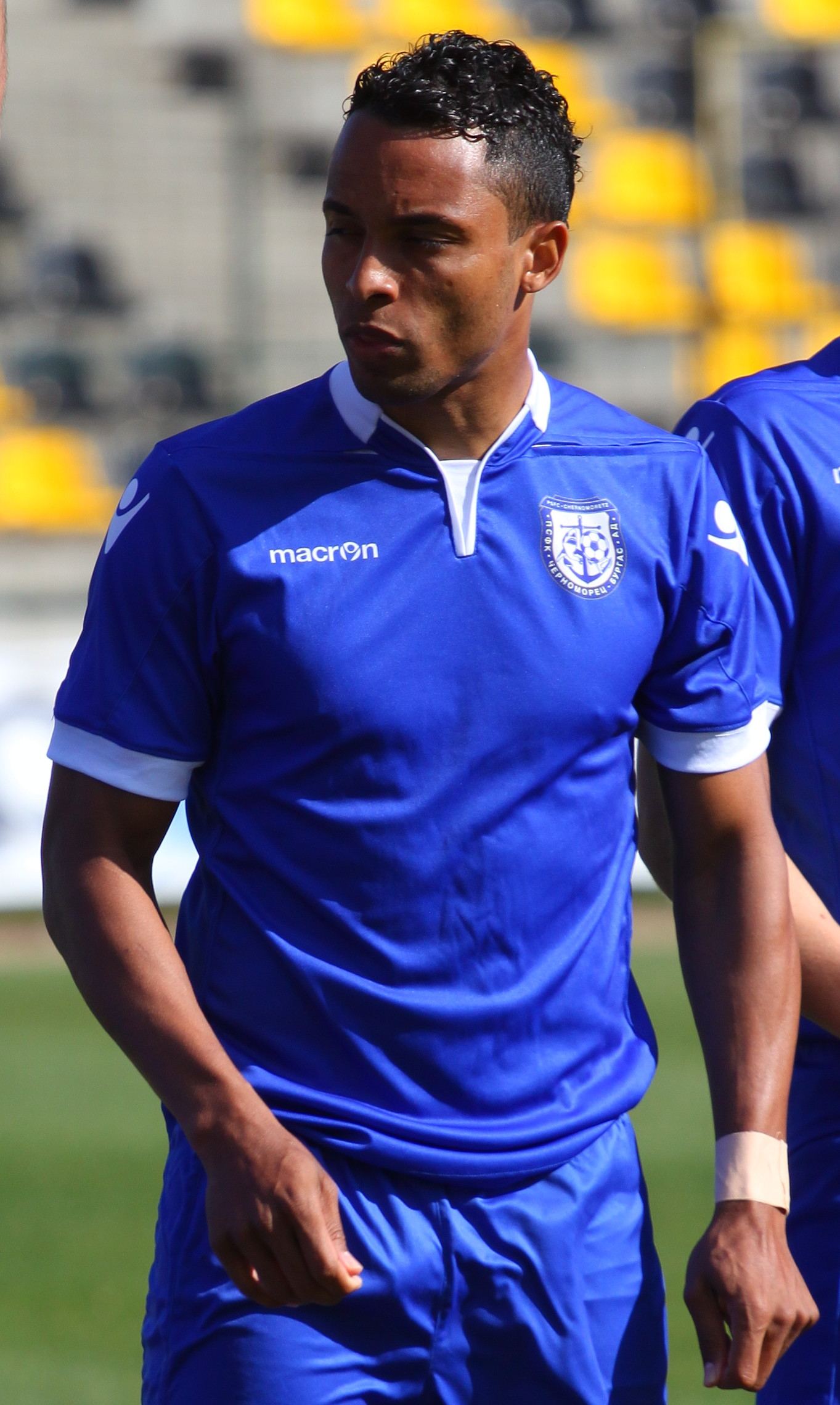
- Assis with Chernomorets Burgas in 2012

Personal information
- Full name: Lourival Rodrigues Assis Filho
- Date of birth: 3 February 1984 (age 42)
- Place of birth: Nova Viçosa, Brazil
- Height: 1.79 m (5 ft 10 in)
- Position: Left winger

Senior career*
Years	Team	Apps	(Gls)
2004–2008	Iraty		
2009	Kalmar	7	(0)
2009	Avaí	6	(0)
2010	América RN	5	(0)
2011	Botafogo SP	12	(0)
2011–2012	Chernomorets Burgas	25	(10)
2012–2014	Gabala	36	(6)
2014	Bragantino	6	(1)
2015	CRAC	12	(5)
2015	Cuiabá	1	(0)
2015	Atlético Goianiense	5	(0)
2016	Brusque	15	(5)
2016	Botafogo-PB	9	(0)
2017	Brusque	15	(1)
2017	Villa Nova	6	(1)
2018	América RJ	10	(4)
2018	Atlético Tubarão	4	(0)
2019	Fluminense de Feira	7	(1)
- * Club domestic league appearances and goals

Lourival Rodrigues Assis Filho (born 3 February 1984) is a Brazilian former professional football midfielder who plays as a left winger.

He has previously played for Iraty, Kalmar, Avaí, América RN, Botafogo SP, Chernomorets Burgas, Gabala, Bragantino, CRAC, Fluminense de Feira.

== Career ==
=== Gabala ===
In August 2012, Assis joined Gabala of the Azerbaijan Premier League on a three-year contract. Assis made his debut came on 4 August 2012 against Simurq coming on as a 60th-minute substitute. Assis played a total of 30 games in all competitions, scoring 6 goals to be the seasons joint top goal scorer with Victor Mendy.

== Career statistics ==
Appearances and goals by club, season and competition
Club	Season	League			National cup		Total	
Club	Season	Division	Apps	Goals	Apps	Goals	Apps	Goals
Kalmar	2009	Allsvenskan	7	0	1	0	8	0
Avaí	2009	Campeonato Brasileiro Série A	6	0	0	0	6	0
América	2010	Campeonato Brasileiro Série B	5	0	1	0	6	0
Botafogo	2011	Campeonato Paulista	12	0	0	0	12	0
Chernomorets Burgas	2011–12	A PFG	25	10	1	0	26	10
Gabala	2012–13	Azerbaijan Premier League	27	6	3	0	30	6
Gabala	2013–14	Azerbaijan Premier League	9	0	5	0	14	0
Gabala	Total		36	6	8	0	44	6
Career total			92	16	11	0	102	16
