= Elhad Naziri =

Azerbaijani footballer (born 1992)

Personal information
- Full name: Elhad Naziri
- Date of birth: 29 December 1992 (age 33)
- Place of birth: Baku, Azerbaijan
- Height: 1.80 m (5 ft 11 in)
- Position: Defender

Youth career
- Neftchi Baku
- Qarabağ

Senior career*
Years	Team	Apps	(Gls)
2011–2012	Lokomotiv Bilajary	20	(7)
2012	Milsami	6	(0)
2013	Petrolul Ploiești	2	(0)
2013	Ravan Baku	0	(0)
2013–2014	Inter Baku	0	(0)
2014	Araz-Naxçıvan	0	(0)
2015	Neftchala	6	(0)
2016	Metalul Reșița	8	(0)
2016	Bakılı Baku	4	(0)
2017	Ravan Baku	5	(1)
Total		51	(8)

International career^{‡}
2012	Azerbaijan	1	(0)
- * Club domestic league appearances and goals as of 23 May 2018 ‡ National team caps and goals as of 17 February 2013

Elhad Naziri (Azerbaijani: Elhad Nəziri; born 29 December 1992) is an Azerbaijani former international footballer who played as a defender.

== Football career ==
Elhad Naziri was born in Baku, Azerbaijan. He played for FK Qarabağ's and Neftchi Baku youth teams. He started his professional career in 2011 with Lokomotiv Bilajary, a club from the Azerbaijan First Division. His second club was Milsami in Moldovan National Division where he would play six matches. He was transferred to FC Petrolul Ploiești in 2013.

In August 2013 Naziri signed for Ravan Baku from Petrolul Ploiești. Before the end of August, he would see his contract cancelled, and he would on to sign a one-year deal with fellow Azerbaijan Premier League side Inter Baku. Naziri was made a free agent when Araz-Naxçıvan folded and withdrew from the Azerbaijan Premier League on 17 November 2014. Naziri signed with Metalul Reșița on 26 February 2016.

== International career ==
He made his national team debut on 14 November 2012 against Northern Ireland in a 2014 FIFA World Cup qualification.

== Career statistics ==
As of 25 Jule 2013.

Club	Season	League		Cup		Europe		Total	
Club	Season	Apps	Goals	Apps	Goals	Apps	Goals	Apps	Goals
Milsami	2012-13	6	0	0	0	—		6	0
Milsami	Total	6	0	0	0	—		6	0
Petrolul Ploiești	2012-13	1	0	0	0	—		1	0
Petrolul Ploiești	2013-14	1	0	0	0	2	0	3	0
Petrolul Ploiești	Total	2	0	0	0	2	0	4	0
Career totals		8	0	0	0	2	0	10	0

== Honours ==
=== Club ===
Petrolul Ploiești

- Cupa României (1): 2012–13

Neftchala

- Azerbaijan First Division (1): 2014–15
