= Will John =

American soccer player

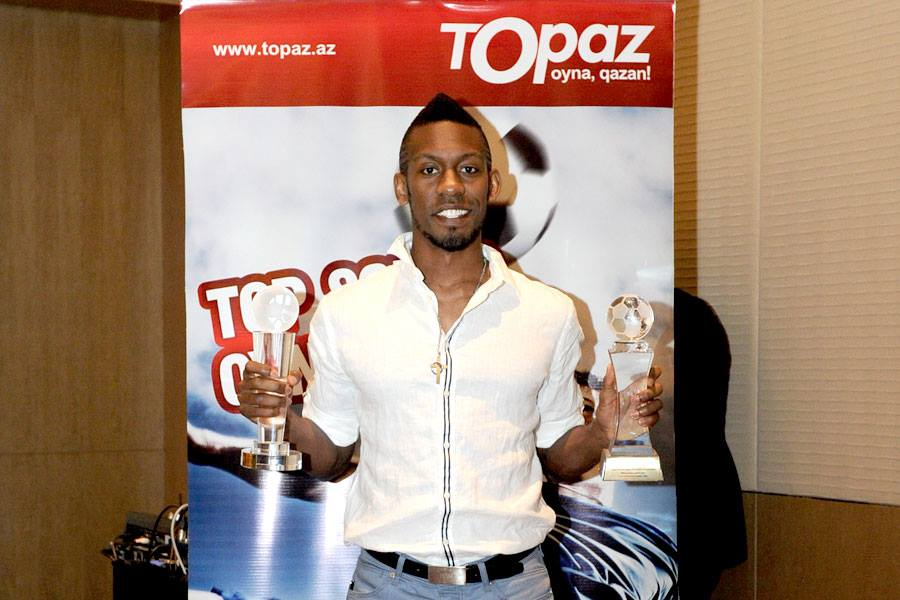
- John with two of his three Goal of the Month awards at Shuvalan FK

Personal information
- Full name: William Oluremi John
- Date of birth: June 13, 1985 (age 41)
- Place of birth: Overland Park, Kansas, U.S.
- Height: 5 ft 9 in (1.75 m)
- Positions: Midfielder; forward

Youth career
- Rockhurst Hawklets
- Kansas City Attack

College career
| Years | Team | Apps | (Gls) |
- Saint Louis Billikens

Senior career*
| Years | Team | Apps | (Gls) |
| 2003–2004 | Kansas City Brass | 12 | (6) |
| 2005 | Chicago Fire | 6 | (0) |
| 2006–2007 | Kansas City Wizards | 4 | (0) |
| 2008 | Randers | 1 | (0) |
| 2008 | Čukarički | 3 | (0) |
| 2009–2011 | Vinogradar | 38 | (3) |
| 2013–2014 | AZAL | 41 | (12) |
| 2014–2015 | MAS Fez | 3 | (0) |
| 2015–2016 | RoPS | 38 | (5) |
| 2018–2019 | Locomotive Tbilisi | 9 | (0) |
| 2021–2022 | Jarun Zagreb | 3 | (0) |

International career^{‡}
- United States U14
- United States U16
| 2005 | United States U20 | 1+ | (10) |
- * Club domestic league appearances and goals as of 20 March 2019 ‡ National team caps and goals as of 09:44, 27 December 2025 (UTC)

William Oluremi John (June 13, 1985) is an American former soccer player. He is also known as Goluremi.

== Early life ==
William John played high school soccer at Rockhurst High School in Kansas City, Missouri. He currently holds the Rockhurst single season scoring title with 36 goals and 20 assists. He played club soccer for the Kansas City Attack. John played college soccer at Saint Louis University, and in the USL Premier Development League for Kansas City Brass.

== Career ==
=== Club ===
John was drafted by the Chicago Fire in the second round of the 2005 MLS SuperDraft and led the team in scoring in the Lamar Hunt US Open Cup. After a season with the Fire, William was traded to the Kansas City Wizards for Diego Gutierrez.

In January 2008, John moved to Danish Superliga side Randers, signing a 1-year contract. On 7 August 2008, Randers announced that William had agreed to personal terms and joined Serbian SuperLiga team Čukarički Stankom.

In February 2009 John signed a contract with MŠK Žilina after agreeing to personal terms with the club. However, his former club Čukarički withheld his registration papers and he was forced to leave the club. William subsequently joined NK Vinogradar.

In February 2013 John signed for Azerbaijan Premier League side AZAL on a two-year contract. He became the first American to play and score in the Azerbaijan Premier League. William came on as a substitute for AZAL in their 3–0 victory against Kəpəz on 24 February 2013. John scored his first goal for AZAL on 3 March 2013 in a home victory over Gabala. William's consecutive goal scoring run was abruptly ended by a slight meniscus tear against Khazar Lankaran. The subsequent surgery saw William miss the remainder of the season.

The 2013–2014 season saw John establish himself as one of the most notable and skillful players in the Azerbaijan Premier League. He became the first player in the league's history to win 3 "Goal of the month awards" in the same season. With 8 goals and 5 assists he was AZAL's leading goal scorer. John is most commonly known in Azerbaijan as Con Oluremi.

After leaving AZAL, John signed for Moroccan Botola side MAS Fez in September 2014. However, in January 2015 William left MAS Fez citing unpaid wages, with a proposed move to League of Ireland powerhouse Shamrock Rovers falling through in February 2015. In August 2015, John signed for Veikkausliiga side RoPS. On September 14, 2015, William's two goals in a win against KTP propelled RoPS to top of the table for the first time in over 25 years. William was awarded Man of the Match for his performance. In March 2016, William signed a new contract with RoPS.

On 13 September 2018, Locomotive Tbilisi announced the signing of John on a contract until the end of the 2020 season.

On September 23, 2021, NK Jarun announced the signing of John. He made his league debut in a match against NK Sesvete on December 4, 2021, a game in which Jarun won 4–3.

=== International ===
John was part of the U-14, U-16 Youth National Teams as well as the U.S. Under-20 team at the 2005 FIFA World Youth Championship. As of June 2009 William is eligible for selection by both the Nigerian and US National teams due to the new FIFA Regulations.

William John serves on the United States Soccer Federation's Athlete Council which is a group of twenty athletes who are elected by their peers. The purpose of the council as laid out in U.S. Soccer's bylaws is to provide a broader means of communication between Athletes and the Federation and make reports and recommendations to the Board of Directors about matters affecting Athletes.

In 2018 John was named U.S. Soccer Foundation Ambassador. The mission of the U.S. Soccer Foundation is to enhance, assist and grow the sport of soccer in the United States, with a special emphasis on underserved communities.

== Career statistics ==
As of 25 November 2018

Appearances and goals by club, season and competition
| Club | Season | League | | | National cup | | League cup | | Continental | | Total | |
| Club | Season | Division | Apps | Goals | Apps | Goals | Apps | Goals | Apps | Goals | Apps | Goals |
|---|---|---|---|---|---|---|---|---|---|---|---|---|
| Vinogradar | 2009–10 | Druga HNL | 12 | 1 | | | — | | — | | 12 | 1 |
| Vinogradar | 2010–11 | Druga HNL | 26 | 2 | | | — | | — | | 26 | 2 |
| Vinogradar | Total | | 38 | 3 | | | — | | — | | 38 | 3 |
| AZAL | 2012–13 | Azerbaijan Premier League | 6 | 4 | 0 | 0 | — | | — | | 6 | 4 |
| AZAL | 2013–14 | Azerbaijan Premier League | 35 | 8 | 1 | 0 | — | | — | | 36 | 8 |
| AZAL | Total | | 41 | 12 | 1 | 0 | — | | — | | 42 | 12 |
| MAS Fez | 2014–15 | Botola | 3 | 0 | 0 | 0 | — | | — | | 3 | 0 |
| RoPS | 2015 | Veikkausliiga | 11 | 3 | 0 | 0 | 0 | 0 | — | | 11 | 3 |
| RoPS | 2016 | Veikkausliiga | 27 | 2 | 2 | 1 | 0 | 0 | 4 | 0 | 33 | 3 |
| RoPS | Total | | 38 | 5 | 2 | 1 | 0 | 0 | 4 | 0 | 44 | 6 |
| Locomotive Tbilisi | 2018 | Erovnuli Liga | 9 | 0 | 0 | 0 | — | | — | | 9 | 0 |
| Career total | | | 129 | 20 | 3 | 1 | 0 | 0 | 4 | 0 | 136 | 21 |

== Media ==
=== YouTube ===
In 2013, John started his own YouTube channel that now has over 900,000 subscribers worldwide and 101 million views. His 21-day challenge has now been viewed by over 12 million people and marked his initial surge into the platform. He speaks at least nine languages, including English, Swedish, Croatian, Italian, Danish, German, Spanish, French and Russian, which he showcases on his Goluremi Languages YouTube channel.
