= Ibrahima Niasse =

Senegalese footballer

Personal information
- Full name: Baye Ibrahima Niasse
- Date of birth: 18 April 1988 (age 38)
- Place of birth: Dakar, Senegal
- Height: 1.88 m (6 ft 2 in)
- Position: Defensive midfielder

Senior career*
Years	Team	Apps	(Gls)
2006–2008	Nancy B	23	(2)
2008–2011	Neuchâtel Xamax	64	(10)
2011	Apollon Limassol	0	(0)
2012–2013	Inter Baku	48	(6)
2013–2014	Gabala	29	(1)
2014–2015	Mordovia Saransk	26	(1)
2016	Concordia Chiajna	13	(0)
2016	Delhi Dynamos	4	(0)
2017–2018	Levadiakos	34	(3)
2018–2019	Raja CA	30	(2)
2019–2020	Gabala	3	(0)
2020	Lamia	11	(0)
2021	Ionikos	19	(4)
2022–2023	Kozani	28	(9)

International career
2007	Senegal U20	4	(1)
- * Club domestic league appearances and goals

Baye Ibrahima Niasse (born 18 April 1988) is a Senegalese former professional footballer.

== Club career ==
Niasse was born in Dakar, Senegal.

He played 64 league games for Neuchâtel Xamax in Switzerland.

On 5 June 2013, Niasse signed a one-year contract with Gabala, moving from fellow Azerbaijan Premier League Inter Baku. Niasse made his debut for Gabala in their 2–1 away victory over FK Baku on 2 August 2013. His first goal for the club was the third goal in a 3–2 victory over Inter Baku in his second game for the club.

After leaving Gabala at the end of his one-year contract, Niasse went on trial with Mordovia Saransk, managed by his former Gabala manager Yuri Semin, signing a two-year contract on 26 June 2014. After just one season with Mordovia Saransk, Niasse left the club by mutual consent in June 2015.

After six months without a club, Niasse signed a six-month contract with Concordia Chiajna in January 2016.

After being released by Concordia China, Niasse signed with Indian Super League side Delhi Dynamos on 10 September 2016.

On 26 January 2017, Niasse signed a season and half contract with Levadiakos.

On 31 October 2019, Niasse returned to Gabala, signing a contract until the end of the 2019–20 season.

On 28 January 2020, Niasse returns to Greek Super League with Lamia.

== Personal life ==
His brother Oumar Niasse is also a professional footballer.

== Career statistics ==
=== Club ===
As of match played 19 December 2019

Appearances and goals by club, season and competition
Club	Season	League			National Cup		Continental		Other		Total	
Club	Season	Division	Apps	Goals	Apps	Goals	Apps	Goals	Apps	Goals	Apps	Goals
Neuchâtel Xamax	2008–09	Swiss Super League	21	4			-		-		21	4
Neuchâtel Xamax	2009–10	Swiss Super League	12	2	1	0	-		-		13	2
Neuchâtel Xamax	2010–11	Swiss Super League	31	4	4	0	-		-		35	4
Neuchâtel Xamax	Total		64	10	5	0	-	-	-	-	69	10
Inter Baku	2011–12	Azerbaijan Premier League	21	3	4	0	0	0	-		25	3
Inter Baku	2012–13	Azerbaijan Premier League	27	3	2	1	3	0	-		32	4
Inter Baku	Total		48	6	6	1	3	0	-	-	57	7
Gabala	2013–14	Azerbaijan Premier League	29	1	6	0	-		-		35	1
Mordovia Saransk	2014–15	Russian Premier League	26	1	2	0	-		-		28	1
Concordia Chiajna	2015–16	Liga I	13	0	2	0	-		-		15	0
Delhi Dynamos	2016	Indian Super League	4	0	-		-		-		4	1
Levadiakos	2016–17	Super League Greece	9	0	1	0	-		-		10	0
Levadiakos	2017–18	Super League Greece	25	3	1	1	-		-		26	4
Levadiakos	Total		34	3	2	1	-	-	-	-	36	4
Raja CA	2018–19	Botola	15	0	0	0	12	0	-		27	0
Gabala	2019–20	Azerbaijan Premier League	3	0	2	0	0	0	-		5	0
Career total			236	21	25	2	15	0	-	-	276	23

== Honours ==
Raja CA

- CAF Confederation Cup: 2018
- CAF Super Cup: 2019

Ionikos

- Super League Greece 2: 2020–21
