= Diego (footballer, born 1979) =

Brazilian footballer

Personal information
- Full name: Diego Costa Silva
- Date of birth: 11 May 1979 (age 47)
- Place of birth: Itaqui, Brazil
- Height: 1.88 m (6 ft 2 in)
- Position: Goalkeeper

Youth career
- 1992–1996: Grêmio
- 1997–1999: Juventude

Senior career*
Years	Team	Apps	(Gls)
1999–2002	Juventude	62	(0)
2003–2005	Atlético-PR	118	(0)
2006–2008	Fluminense	13	(0)
2009	Santo André		
2009–2010	Leixões	23	(0)
2010–2012	Vitória Setúbal	58	(0)
2012–2014	Gabala	25	(0)
2015	Juventude	2	(0)
2015–2017	Vitória Setúbal	0	(0)
Total		301	(0)
- * Club domestic league appearances and goals

Diego Costa Silva (born 11 May 1979), known simply as Diego, is a Brazilian former professional footballer who played as a goalkeeper.

== Club career ==
Born in Itaqui, Rio Grande do Sul, Diego represented in his country Esporte Clube Juventude, Clube Atlético Paranaense, Fluminense FC and Esporte Clube Santo André. He competed in the Série A with all the clubs, for example being an undisputed starter for the second as it finished second in the 2004 season (45 games).

In 2009, Diego moved to Portugal, where he played for Leixões S.C. and Vitória FC, both in the Primeira Liga. At the end of his second campaign with the Setúbal-based team, he was chosen as best player in the squad.

In June 2012, 33-year-old Diego signed for Azerbaijan Premier League side Gabala FC, on a two-year contract. In his first season at his new club he split starting duties with Anar Nazirov, appearing in a total of 18 official matches – two in the domestic cup – and making his debut on 4 August against Simurq PFC.

== Personal life ==
Diego's son, Diego Callai, is also a professional football goalkeeper.

== Club statistics ==
As of 3 November 2013

Club statistics
Season	Club	League	League		Cup		League Cup		Other		Total	
Season	Club	League	App	Goals	App	Goals	App	Goals	App	Goals	App	Goals
Portugal			League		Taça de Portugal		Taça da Liga		Europe		Total	
2009–10	Leixões	Primeira Liga	23	0	0	0	3	0	-		26	0
2010–11	Setúbal	Primeira Liga	30	0	3	0	0	0	-		33	0
2011–12	Setúbal	Primeira Liga	28	0	0	0	2	0	-		30	0
Azerbaijan			League		Azerbaijan Cup		League Cup		Europe		Total	
2012–13	Gabala	Azerbaijan Premier League	16	0	2	0	-		-		18	0
2013–14	Gabala	Azerbaijan Premier League	9	0	0	0	-		-		9	0
Total	Portugal		81	0	3	0	5	0	0	0	89	0
Total	Azerbaijan		25	0	2	0	0	0	0	0	27	0
Total			106	0	5	0	5	0	0	0	116	0

== Honours ==
=== Club ===
Juventude

- Campeonato Gaúcho: 1998
- Copa do Brasil: 1999

Atlético Paranaense

- Campeonato Paranaense: 2005

Fluminense

- Copa do Brasil: 2007
- Copa Libertadores: Runner-up 2008

=== Individual ===
- Bola de Prata: 2002
