= Mertcan Demirer =

Turkish professional footballer

Mertcan Demirer (born 14 March 1993 in Kadıköy) is a Turkish professional footballer who plays as a midfielder for Kars 36 Spor.

== Life and career ==
Demirer began his career with Beşiktaş J.K. in 2006. He made his professional debut on 21 May 2011 against Gaziantepspor replacing Rıdvan Şimşek.
