= Dawid Pietrzkiewicz =

Polish footballer (born 1988)

Personal information
- Date of birth: 9 February 1988 (age 38)
- Place of birth: Sanok, Poland
- Height: 1.89 m (6 ft 2 in)
- Position: Goalkeeper

Team information
- Current team: Zgoda Zarszyn (player-manager)
- Number: 20

Senior career*
Years	Team	Apps	(Gls)
2004	Alces Długie		
2004–2007	Stal Sanok	34	(0)
2007–2008	Polonia Warsaw	1	(0)
2008	Polonia Warsaw II	4	(0)
2009	Stal Sanok	17	(0)
2009–2012	Baník Ostrava	25	(0)
2010–2011	→ NK Primorje (loan)	10	(0)
2012–2013	Simurq	28	(0)
2013–2014	Gabala	10	(0)
2015–2017	Gabala	2	(0)
2017–2018	Sandecja Nowy Sącz	1	(0)
2019–2020	Raków Częstochowa	0	(0)
2020	Stal Stalowa Wola	14	(0)
2020–2023	Sandecja Nowy Sącz	66	(0)
2024–	Zgoda Zarszyn	41	(47)

International career
	Poland U19	8	(0)

Managerial career
- 2023–: Zgoda Zarszyn
- * Club domestic league appearances and goals as of 10:47, 26 November 2025 (UTC)

Dawid Pietrzkiewicz (born 9 February 1988) is a Polish footballer who is a player-manager for regional league club Zgoda Zarszyn. A goalkeeper throughout his entire professional career, he is currently an outfield player.

== Club career ==
In September 2010, he was loaned to NK Primorje. He made his Gambrinus liga debut for Baník Ostrava on 30 April 2011. In the summer of 2012, Pietrzkiewicz joined Azerbaijan Premier League side Simurq. In his only season with the club he featured in all bar 4 games for Simurq, making 31 appearances.

=== Gabala ===
On 5 June 2013, Pietrzkiewicz was unveiled as a new signing for Gabala, moving from fellow Azerbaijan Premier League club Simurq on a one-year contract with the option of another year. He made his debut on 2 August 2013 in their 1–2 away victory against Baku. Pietrzkiewicz left Gabala at the end of his one-year contract, having made 10 appearances for the club. After being without a club for a year, Pietrzkiewicz re-signed with Gabala on 28 July 2015.

=== Sandecja Nowy Sącz ===
On 22 August 2017, he signed a contract with Sandecja Nowy Sącz.

=== Stal Stalowa Wola ===
Pietrzkiewicz played 14 matches for Stal Stalowa Wola in the 2019–20 II liga season. On 10 August 2020, his contract was terminated.

== International career ==
He was a part of the Poland national under-19 team.

== Career statistics ==
As of match played 16 November 2025

Appearances and goals by club, season and competition
Club	Season	League			National cup (Note: Includes Polish Cup, Czech Cup)		Europe		Total	
Club	Season	Division	Apps	Goals	Apps	Goals	Apps	Goals	Apps	Goals
Stal Sanok	2006–07	III liga, gr. IV			4	0	—		4	0
Polonia Warsaw	2007–08	II liga	1	0	2	0	—		3	0
Stal Sanok	2008–09	IV liga Subcarpathia			2	0	—		0	0
Baník Ostrava	2009–10	Gambrinus Liga	0	0			—		0	0
Baník Ostrava	2010–11	Gambrinus Liga	3	0			—		3	0
Baník Ostrava	2011–12	Gambrinus Liga	22	0	1	0	—		23	0
Baník Ostrava	Total		25	0	1	0	—		26	0
Primorje (loan)	2010–11	Slovenian PrvaLiga	10	0	0	0	—		10	0
Simurq	2012–13	Azerbaijan Premier League	28	0	0	0	—		28	0
Gabala	2013–14	Azerbaijan Premier League	10	0	0	0	—		10	0
Gabala	2015–16	Azerbaijan Premier League	1	0	0	0	1 (Note: Appearance in UEFA Europa League)	0	2	0
Gabala	2016–17	Azerbaijan Premier League	1	0	0	0	0	0	1	0
Gabala	Total		12	0	0	0	1	0	13	0
Sandecja Nowy Sącz	2017–18	Ekstraklasa	1	0	0	0	—		1	0
Raków Częstochowa	2019–20	Ekstraklasa	0	0	0	0	—		0	0
Stal Stalowa Wola	2019–20	II liga	14	0	—		—		14	0
Sandecja Nowy Sącz	2020–21	I liga	21	0	0	0	—		21	0
Sandecja Nowy Sącz	2021–22	I liga	34	0	0	0	—		34	0
Sandecja Nowy Sącz	2022–23	I liga	11	0	0	0	—		11	0
Sandecja Nowy Sącz	Total		66	0	0	0	—		66	0
Zgoda Zarszyn	2024–25	Klasa A Krosno I	27	35	—		—		27	35
Zgoda Zarszyn	2025–26	Regional league Krosno	14	12	—		—		14	12
Zgoda Zarszyn	Total		41	47	—		—		41	47
Career total			198	0	9	0	1	0	208	47

== Managerial statistics ==
As of match played 16 November 2025

Managerial record by team and tenure
Team	From	To	Record							
Team	From	To	G	W	D	L	GF	GA	GD	Win %
Zgoda Zarszyn	September 2023	Present	65	43	12	10	208	83	+125	66.15
Total			65	43	12	10	208	83	+125	66.15

== Honours ==
Stal Sanok

- IV liga Subcarpathia: 2008–09
