= Abdulwaheed Afolabi =

Nigerian footballer (born 1991)

Personal information
- Date of birth: 8 December 1991 (age 34)
- Place of birth: Kaduna, Nigeria
- Height: 1.96 m (6 ft 5 in)
- Position: Striker

Team information
- Current team: Loto-Popo FC

Youth career
- 2003: Karamone

Senior career*
Years	Team	Apps	(Gls)
2009–2011	Niger Tornadoes	48	(21)
2012	Tavriya Simferopol	4	(0)
2012–2013	Kuban Krasnodar	2	(0)
2013–2014	Gabala	22	(1)
2014–2015	Saxan Gagauz Yeri	16	(1)
2015–2016	Lobi Stars	4	(0)
2017	Shooting Stars	10	(2)
2017	Gombe United	14	(2)
2018	Plateau United	6	(0)
2018–2019	El-Kanemi Warriors	5	(0)
2019–2020	Kwara United	11	(1)
2020–	Loto-Popo FC	0	(0)

International career
2006–2007	Nigeria U-17	7	(3)
2008–2009	Nigeria U-20	5	(2)
2009	Nigeria U-23	2	(1)
- * Club domestic league appearances and goals as of 1 March 2020

Abdulwaheed Afolabi (born 8 December 1991) is a Nigerian professional football player who plays for Beninese club Loto-Popo FC. Abdulwaheed has played for Russian Premier League team Kuban Krasnodar and Ukraine Premier League team Tavriya Simferopol. He has earned 14 caps and scored 3 goals for the Nigeria national youth teams.

== Career ==
Afolabi went on trial with Black Leopards of the South African Premier Soccer League in August 2011, but negotiations broke down and he returned to Niger Tornadoes. In March 2012, Afolabi signed a two-year contract with Ukrainian side Tavriya Simferopol. Afolabi then transferred to Russian Premier League side Kuban Krasnodar in August 2012, signing a four-year contract. Afolabi made his debut for Kubam on 30 November 2012 in a game against FC Krasnodar.

In May 2017, Afolabi signing for Gombe United.
