= Adil Ibragimov =

Russian footballer

Personal information
- Full name: Adil Abukayevich Ibragimov
- Date of birth: April 23, 1989 (age 37)
- Place of birth: Makhachkala, USSR (now Russia)
- Height: 1.87 m (6 ft 1 1/2 in)
- Position: Defender

Youth career
- 2001–2002: Torpedo Moscow
- 2002–2007: CSKA Moscow
- 2007–2009: Khimki

Senior career*
Years	Team	Apps	(Gls)
2009–2010	Khimki	36	(2)
2011–2013	Fakel Voronezh	16	(0)
2012	→ Skonto Riga (loan)	13	(0)
2013–2014	Sumgayit	32	(0)
2014	FC Strogino Moscow	0	(0)
2014	FC SKChF Sevastopol	16	(0)
2015	FC Solyaris Moscow	4	(0)
2016–2017	NTSV Strand 08	25	(0)
2018	Phönix Lübeck	5	(0)
2018	TSV Travemünde	7	(0)
2019–2020	Sereetzer SV		
- * Club domestic league appearances and goals

Adil Abukayevich Ibragimov (Russian: Адиль Абукаевич Ибрагимов; born 23 April 1989) is a Russian former football player.

== Career ==
Ibragimov made his debut in the Russian Premier League on 13 June 2009 for FC Khimki in a game against FC Spartak Moscow.

Whilst on loan with Skonto Riga, Ibragimov won the 2012 Latvian Cup, despite being sent off after in the 62nd minute.

In July 2013 Ibragimov signed a two-year contract with Sumgayit of the Azerbaijan Premier League. After one season with Sumgayit, Ibragimov left in June 2014.

== Career statistics ==
As of 16 June 2014

Club performance			League		Cup		Continental		Total	
Season	Club	League	Apps	Goals	Apps	Goals	Apps	Goals	Apps	Goals
2013–14	Sumgayit	Azerbaijan Premier League	32	0	1	0	-		33	0
Total	Azerbaijan		32	0	1	0	-		33	0
Career total			32	0	1	0	-		33	0

== Personal life ==
Ibragimov is the second cousin of fellow footballer Eldar Mamayev.

== Honours ==
Skonto Riga

- Latvian Cup (1): 2011–12
