= Rail Malikov =

Azerbaijani footballer (born 1985)

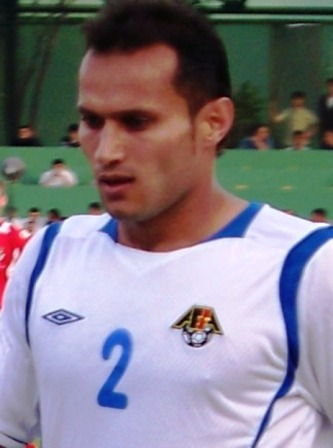

Personal information
- Full name: Rail Nadir oglu Malikov
- Date of birth: 18 December 1985 (age 40)
- Place of birth: Baku, Azerbaijan SSR, Soviet Union
- Height: 1.87 m (6 ft 1 1/2 in)
- Position: Defender

Senior career*
Years	Team	Apps	(Gls)
2004–2007	FC Baku	73	(1)
2007–2012	Neftchi Baku	115	(1)
2012–2013	Denizlispor	25	(0)
2013–2014	Gabala	10	(0)
2014–2015	Denizlispor	6	(0)
2015–2016	AZAL	33	(0)
2016–2020	Sumgayit	73	(0)
2020–2022	Keşla	1	(0)

International career
2004–2011	Azerbaijan	40	(0)

Managerial career
- 2023–2024: Araz-Naxçıvan (assistant)
- * Club domestic league appearances and goals

Rail Malikov (Azerbaijani: Rail Məlikov; born 18 December 1985) is an Azerbaijani football coach and a former defender.

== Career ==
Malikov was born in Baku, Azerbaijan.

In the summer of 2012, Malikov left Neftchi Baku for TFF First League side Denizlispor. Malikov made 25 appearances for Denizlispor in his first, and only season with the club.

=== Gabala ===
On 2 July 2013, Malikov returned to the Azerbaijan Premier League to sign a one-year contract with Gabala. Malikov made his debut for Gabala on 2 August 2013 against Baku, a game Gabala won 2–1. On 31 August 2013, in Gabala's 2–0 victory over Khazar Lankaran, Malikov broke his leg and was ruled out for 4–5 months. Malikov made his return from injury on 19 March 2014 in the Azerbaijan Cup. Malikov left Gabala at the end of his contract.

=== Return to Denizlispor ===
On 7 August 2014, Malikov re-signed for Denizlispor on a one-year contract.

=== Sumgayit ===
On 21 June 2016, Malikov signed with Sumgayit.

=== Keşla ===
On 24 August 2020, Malikov signed a contract with Keşla FK until the end of the 2020–21 season.

== Career statistics ==
As of match played 29 April 2017

Club performance			League		Cup		Continental		Total	
Season	Club	League	Apps	Goals	Apps	Goals	Apps	Goals	Apps	Goals
Azerbaijan			League		Azerbaijan Cup		Europe		Total	
2003–04	FC Baku	Azerbaijan Premier League	24	1			-		24	1
2004–05	FC Baku	Azerbaijan Premier League	26	0			-		26	0
2005–06	FC Baku	Azerbaijan Premier League	24	0			-		24	0
2006–07	FC Baku	Azerbaijan Premier League	23	0			-		23	0
2007–08	Neftchi Baku	Azerbaijan Premier League	21	0			-		21	0
2008–09	Neftchi Baku	Azerbaijan Premier League	21	0			-		21	0
2009–10	Neftchi Baku	Azerbaijan Premier League	27	1	1	0	-		28	1
2010–11	Neftchi Baku	Azerbaijan Premier League	20	0	3	0	-		23	0
2011–12	Neftchi Baku	Azerbaijan Premier League	25	0	2	0	2	0	29	0
Turkey			League		Turkish Cup		Europe		Total	
2012–13	Denizlispor	TFF First League	25	0	0	0	-		25	0
Azerbaijan			League		Azerbaijan Cup		Europe		Total	
2013–14	Gabala	Azerbaijan Premier League	10	0	2	0	-		12	0
Turkey			League		Turkish Cup		Europe		Total	
2014–15	Denizlispor	TFF First League	6	0	1	0	-		7	0
Azerbaijan			League		Azerbaijan Cup		Europe		Total	
2015–16	AZAL	Azerbaijan Premier League	33	0	0	0	-		33	0
2016–17	Sumgayit	Azerbaijan Premier League	24	0	2	0	-		26	0
Total	Azerbaijan		279	2	10	0	2	0	291	0
Total	Turkey		31	0	1	0	-		32	0
Career total			310	2	11	0	2	0	323	2

== Honours ==
FK Baku

- Azerbaijan Premier League (1): 2005–06
- Azerbaijan Cup (1): 2004–05

Neftchi Baku

- Azerbaijan Premier League (2): 2010–11, 2011–12
