= 2013–14 Ravan Baku season =

Ravan Baku
2013-14 season
- President: Mushfig Safiyev
- Manager: Ramil Aliyev until 12 August 2013; Vladislav Kadyrov; 12 August - 5 October 2013; Shahin Diniyev; 7 October 2013 - 3 January 2014; Güvenç Kurtar; 3 January 2014 -
- Stadium: Bayil Stadium
- Premier League: 10th
- Azerbaijan Cup: Semifinals vs Neftchi Baku
- Top goalscorer: League: Miloš Adamović (5); All: Miloš Adamović (5)
- Highest home attendance: 1,000 vs Khazar Lankaran; 4 October 2013
- Lowest home attendance: 200 vs Baku; 17 May 2014
- Average home league attendance: 483
Home colours	Away colours

The Ravan Baku 2013-14 season was Ravan Baku's third, and final, season in the Azerbaijan Premier League, after finishing 10th and being relegated. They also reached the Semifinals of the Azerbaijan Cup where they were defeated by Neftchi Baku. It was to be Ramil Aliyev's first full season as manager, however he resigned on 12 August 2013 following 2 successive defeats and Ravan bottom of the table, Vladislav Kadyrov took over as manager. Kadyrov was himself was replaced on 7 October by Shahin Diniyev, who resigned on 3 January 2014 with Güvenç Kurtar being appointed in his place.

== Squad ==
As of 8 March 2014

Note: Flags indicate national team as defined under FIFA eligibility rules; some limited exceptions apply. Players may hold more than one non-FIFA nationality.

No.	Pos.	Nation	Player
1	GK	POL	Łukasz Sapela
4	DF	SLO	Mitja Mörec
6	MF	AZE	Jeyhun Javadov
7	MF	AZE	Elvin Hasanliyev
8	DF	BRA	Júlio César
9	FW	AZE	Elnur Abdulov
10	FW	BRA	Thiago Miracema
11	MF	AZE	Kamil Nurähmädov
12	GK	AZE	Fuad Ahmadov
14	FW	ARG	Juan Varea
15	DF	EST	Dmitri Kruglov
16	MF	AZE	Orkhan Lalayev
17	MF	AZE	Ramazan Abbasov

No.	Pos.	Nation	Player
18	FW	NGR	Oke Akpoveta
19	MF	AZE	Huseyn Akhundov
20	MF	SRB	Miloš Adamović
21	DF	AZE	Novruz Mammadov
22	MF	AZE	Tofig Mikayilov
24	DF	AZE	Yamin Ağakärimzadä
25	MF	AZE	Ayaz Mehdiyev
28	DF	BIH	Bojan Marković
30	MF	AZE	Jamshid Maharramov
40	MF	CMR	Michel Balokog
41	MF	SVK	Kamil Kopúnek
85	GK	AZE	Kamal Bayramov
99	GK	AZE	Murad Ganbarov

== Transfers ==
=== Summer ===
In: Note: Flags indicate national team as defined under FIFA eligibility rules; some limited exceptions apply. Players may hold more than one non-FIFA nationality.

No.	Pos.	Nation	Player
5	DF	AZE	Agil Nabiyev (from (Azerbaijan) Baku)
6	MF	AZE	Jeyhun Javadov
7	MF	AZE	Elvin Häsänäliyev (from (Azerbaijan) Kəpəz)
9	FW	AZE	Elnur Abdulov (from (Azerbaijan) Qarabağ)
10	FW	SWE	Sebastian Castro-Tello (loan from (Sweden) Hammarby)
11	FW	AZE	Kamil Nurähmädov (from (Azerbaijan) Neftchi Baku)
12	GK	AZE	Fuad Ahmadov
18	FW	AZE	Bakhtiyar Soltanov (from (Azerbaijan) Qarabağ)
21	DF	AZE	Novruz Mammadov (from (Azerbaijan) Baku)
23	MF	ARG	Cristian Torres (from (Azerbaijan) Qarabağ)
27	MF	AZE	Rashad Abdullayev (loan from (Azerbaijan) Baku)
29	DF	AZE	Aziz Guliyev (loan from (Azerbaijan) Baku)
30	MF	AZE	Jamshid Maharramov (from (Azerbaijan) Kapaz)
33	DF	TJK	Sokhib Suvonkulov (from (Tajikistan) Istiqlol Dushanbe)
35	MF	SWE	Fredrik Holster (from (Sweden) GIF Sundsvall)
38	DF	CZE	Ivan Pecha (from (Belarus) Neman Grodno)
40	MF	CMR	Michel Balokog (from (Slovenia) NK Domžale)
64	DF	AZE	Elhad Naziri (from (Romania) Petrolul Ploiești)
85	GK	AZE	Kamal Bayramov (from (Azerbaijan) Turan Tovuz)
—	DF	SLO	Jovan Vidović (from (Slovenia) Maribor)
—	FW	NGR	Kabiru Musa (from (Egypt) Al-Mokawloon Al-Arab)

Out: Note: Flags indicate national team as defined under FIFA eligibility rules; some limited exceptions apply. Players may hold more than one non-FIFA nationality.

No.	Pos.	Nation	Player
4	DF	AZE	Nodar Mammadov (to (Azerbaijan) Sumgayit)
5	DF	MDA	Nicolae Orlovschi (to (Moldova) Dacia Chișinău)
7	MF	AZE	Ramil Hashimzade
8	MF	AZE	Tural Akhundov (to (Azerbaijan) Simurq)
10	MF	LTU	Mindaugas Kalonas (to (Azerbaijan) Baku)
12	GK	AZE	Davud Karimi (to (Turkey) Fethiyespor)
13	MF	AZE	Shahriyar Rahimov (to (Azerbaijan) AZAL)
15	MF	AZE	Tural Jalilov (to (Azerbaijan) Khazar Lankaran)
18	MF	SLE	Samuel Barlay (to (Azerbaijan) AZAL)
18	FW	AZE	Bakhtiyar Soltanov (to (Azerbaijan) Araz)
27	MF	AZE	Nuran Gurbanov (loan return to (Azerbaijan) Gabala)
28	MF	AZE	Emin Mustafayev
64	DF	AZE	Elhad Naziri (to (Azerbaijan) Inter Baku)
—	DF	SLO	Jovan Vidović (to (Germany) Wehen Wiesbaden)
—	FW	NGR	Kabiru Musa (to (Egypt) El Qanah)

=== Winter ===
In: Note: Flags indicate national team as defined under FIFA eligibility rules; some limited exceptions apply. Players may hold more than one non-FIFA nationality.

No.	Pos.	Nation	Player
4	DF	SLO	Mitja Mörec (from (Kazakhstan) Kaisar)
8	DF	BRA	Júlio César (from (Brazil) Central)
10	MF	BRA	Thiago Miracema (from (Brazil) Sampaio Corrêa)
15	DF	EST	Dmitri Kruglov (from (Estonia) Levadia)
18	FW	NGR	Oke Akpoveta (from (Denmark) Brøndby)
28	DF	BIH	Bojan Marković (from (Israel) Hapoel Be'er Sheva)
41	MF	SVK	Kamil Kopúnek (from (Slovakia) Slovan Bratislava)

Out: Note: Flags indicate national team as defined under FIFA eligibility rules; some limited exceptions apply. Players may hold more than one non-FIFA nationality.

No.	Pos.	Nation	Player
5	DF	AZE	Agil Nabiyev
10	FW	SWE	Sebastian Castro-Tello (loan return to (Sweden) Hammarby IF)
23	MF	ARG	Cristian Torres (to (Latvia) Liepājas Metalurgs)
27	MF	AZE	Rashad Abdullayev (loan return to (Azerbaijan) Baku)
29	DF	AZE	Aziz Guliyev (loan return to (Azerbaijan) Baku)
33	DF	TJK	Sokhib Suvonkulov
35	MF	SWE	Fredrik Holster (to (Sweden) Assyriska)
38	DF	SVK	Ivan Pecha (to (Latvia) Liepājas Metalurgs)
89	MF	AZE	Vusal Garaev

== Competitions ==
=== Friendlies ===
10 January 2014	Sumgayit	0 – 0	Ravan Baku	Sumqayit
16:00 AZT (UTC+4)		Summary		Stadium: Mehdi Huseynzade Stadium

12 January 2014	Ravan Baku	1 – 0	Araz	Baku
13:00 AZT (UTC+4)	Miracema	Summary		Stadium: Bayil Stadium

19 January 2014	Ravan Baku (Azerbaijan)	2 – 1	(Brazil) União	Antalya, Turkey
19:00 AZT (UTC+4)	Nurähmädov; J.Javadov	[ Summary]	Goal

22 January 2014	Ravan Baku (Azerbaijan)	1 – 0	(Romania) Universitatea Craiova	Antalya, Turkey
AZT (UTC+4)	Miracema 27'	Summary

25 January 2014	Ravan Baku (Azerbaijan)	Cancelled	(Croatia) Hajduk Split	Antalya, Turkey
19:30 AZT (UTC+4)		Summary

=== Azerbaijan Premier League ===
==== Results summary ====
Overall								Home						Away					
Pld	W	D	L	GF	GA	GD	Pts	W	D	L	GF	GA	GD	W	D	L	GF	GA	GD
36	4	10	22	22	66	−44	22	3	6	9	13	26	−13	1	4	13	9	40	−31

Last updated: 19 May 2014.
Source: Soccerway

==== Results by round ====
Round	1	2	3	4	5	6	7	8	9	10	11	12	13	14	15	16	17	18	19	20	21	22	23	24	25	26	27	28	29	30	31	32	33	34	35	36
Ground	A	H	A	H	A	H	A	H	H	A	H	A	H	A	H	A	A	H	A	H	A	H	A	H	H	A	H	A	H	A	H	A	A	H	A	H
Result	L	L	L	L	W	D	L	D	D	L	D	L	D	D	L	L	L	L	L	L	D	L	D	W	W	L	L	L	D	L	L	D	L	W	L	L
Position	9	10	10	10	10	9	10	10	9	9	9	9	9	9	9	9	9	9	9	9	9	9	10	9	9	9	9	9	9	10	10	10	10	10	10	10

Source: Soccerway
A = Away; H = Home; W = Win; D = Draw; L = Loss

==== Results ====
3 August 2013 1	Simurq	2 – 0	Ravan Baku	Qabala
18:30 AZST (UTC+5)	Poljak 64'; Safiyaroglu 88'	Summary		Stadium: Gabala City Stadium; Attendance: 150; Referee: Orkhan Mämmädov

9 August 2013 2	Ravan Baku	0 – 2	Neftchi Baku	Baku
21:00 AZST (UTC+5)	Adamović (yellow card) 51' (yellow-red card) 78'	Summary	Nasimov 15', 85'	Stadium: Bayil Stadium; Attendance: 500; Referee: Ramil Diniyev

18 August 2013 3	Baku	5 – 0	Ravan Baku	Baku
18:00 AZST (UTC+5)	Travner 9'; Kalonas 11', 39'; Huseynov 79'; Šolić 82'	Summary		Stadium: Tofik Bakhramov Stadium Training Ground^{2} Attendance: 1,000; Referee: Vusal Äliyev

25 August 2013 4	Ravan Baku	1 – 5	Inter Baku	Baku
20:00 AZST (UTC+5)	Castro-Tello 12'	Summary	Abdoulaye 17'; Tskhadadze 30', 36', 42'; Mammadov 88'	Stadium: Bayil Stadium; Attendance: 250; Referee: Elvin Äsgärov

31 August 2013 5	Sumgayit	0 – 1	Ravan Baku	Sumqayit
18:00 AZST (UTC+5)		Summary	Nurähmädov 50'; Abbasov (yellow card) 68' (yellow-red card) 89'	Stadium: Mehdi Huseynzade Stadium; Attendance: 1,700; Referee: Fariz Yusifov

13 September 2013 6	Ravan Baku	1 – 1	Qarabağ	Baku
18:00 AZST (UTC+5)	Castro-Tello 19'	Summary	George 88'	Stadium: Bayil Stadium; Attendance: 300; Referee: Sabayel Gurbanova

20 September 2013 7	Gabala	3 – 0	Ravan Baku	Qabala
17:00 AZST (UTC+5)	Subotić 8'; Levin 10'; Leonardo 52' (pen.)	Summary		Stadium: Gabala City Stadium; Attendance: 500; Referee: Rahim Hasanov

29 September 2013 8	Ravan Baku	0 – 0	AZAL	Baku
19:00 AZST (UTC+5)		Summary		Stadium: Bayil Stadium; Attendance: 300; Referee: Rauf Jabbarov

4 October 2013 9	Ravan Baku	1 – 1	Khazar Lankaran	Baku
18:00 AZST (UTC+5)	Suvonkulov 18'	Summary	Nildo 75'	Stadium: Bayil Stadium; Attendance: 1,000; Referee: Elvin Äsgärov

19 October 2013 10	Neftchi Baku	2 – 1	Ravan Baku	Baku
16:00 AZST (UTC+5)	Denis 65'; Nasimov 79'	Summary	Varea 8'	Stadium: Bakcell Arena; Attendance: 1,000; Referee: Orkhan Mämmädov

25 October 2013 11	Ravan Baku	0 – 0	Baku	Baku
18:00 AZST (UTC+5)		Summary		Stadium: Bayil Stadium; Attendance: 300; Referee: Fariz Yusifov

2 November 2013 12	Inter Baku	3 – 2	Ravan Baku	Baku
17:00 AZT (UTC+4)	Tskhadadze 5'; Javadov 11'; Abdoulaye 82'	Summary	Abbasov 15'; Adamović 90'	Stadium: Shafa Stadium; Referee: Vusal Äliyev

8 November 2013 13	Ravan Baku	1 – 1	Sumgayit	Baku
17:00 AZT (UTC+4)	Javadov 15'	Summary	Fardjad-Azad 45'	Stadium: Bayil Stadium; Attendance: 500; Referee: Aliyar Ağayev

24 November 2013 14	Qarabağ	0 – 0	Ravan Baku	Baku
18:00 AZT (UTC+4)		Summary		Stadium: Tofiq Bahramov Stadium^{1} Attendance: 700; Referee: Rauf Jabbarov

29 November 2013 15	Ravan Baku	0 – 1	Gabala	Baku
19:00 AZT (UTC+4)	Abdullayev (yellow card) 69' (yellow-red card) 85'	Summary	Kamanan 26'	Stadium: Bayil Stadium; Attendance: 250; Referee: Vusal Äliyev

8 December 2013 16	AZAL	2 – 1	Ravan Baku	Baku
16:00 AZT (UTC+4)	Rahimov 90', 90+4'	Summary	H.Akhundov 50'	Stadium: AZAL Arena; Attendance: 200; Referee: Orkhan Mämmädov

15 December 2013 17	Khazar Lankaran	1 – 0	Ravan Baku	Lankaran
16:00 AZT (UTC+4)	Etame 27'	Summary		Stadium: Lankaran City Stadium; Attendance: 4,000; Referee: Rauf Jabbarov

20 December 2013 18	Ravan Baku	0 – 3	Simurq	Baku
16:00 AZT (UTC+4)	Balokog (red card) 59'	Summary	Ćeran 22'; Costin 39'; Poljak 45'	Stadium: Bayil Stadium; Attendance: 200; Referee: Rahim Häsänov

2 February 2014 19	Baku	5 – 1	Raven Baku	Baku
13:30 AZT (UTC+4)	Huseynov 12' (pen.); Ristović 23'; Juninho 46'; R.Aliyev 65'; Šolić 80'	Summary	Miracema 90+'	Stadium: Tofik Bakhramov Stadium

8 February 2014 20	Ravan Baku	1 – 2	Inter Baku	Baku
15:00 AZT (UTC+4)	H.Akhundov (yellow card) 19' (yellow-red card) 44'; Akpoveta 56'	Summary	Iashvili 17'; Javadov 90+4'	Stadium: Bayil Stadium; Attendance: 500; Referee: Rauf Jabbarov

15 February 2014 21	Sumgayit	1 – 1	Ravan Baku	Sumqayit
16:00 AZT (UTC+4)	Hajiyev 24'	Summary	Adamović 43'	Stadium: Mehdi Huseynzade Stadium; Attendance: 1,200; Referee: Fariz Yusifov

19 February 2014 22	Ravan Baku	0 – 2	Qarabağ	Baku
17:00 AZT (UTC+4)		Summary	George 61', 68'	Stadium: Bayil Stadium; Attendance: 1,000; Referee: Omar Paşayev

23 February 2014 23	Gabala	0 – 0	Ravan Baku	Qabala
13:00 AZT (UTC+4)		Summary	Sapela (red card) 74'	Stadium: Gabala City Stadium; Attendance: 1,500; Referee: Elvin Äsgärov

28 February 2014 24	Ravan Baku	1 – 0	AZAL	Baku
19:00 AZT (UTC+4)	Maharramov (yellow card) 20' (yellow-red card) 46'; Adamović 76'	Summary	Junior (red card) 75'; Igbekoi (yellow card) 71' (yellow-red card) 85'	Stadium: Bayil Stadium; Attendance: 800; Referee: Rahim Häsänov

8 March 2014 25	Ravan Baku	2 – 1	Khazar Lankaran	Baku
15:00 AZT (UTC+4)	O.Lalayev 32'; Adamović 90+3'	Summary	Gligorov 12'	Stadium: Bayil Stadium; Attendance: 2,000; Referee: Omar Paşayev

16 March 2014 26	Simurq	2 – 0	Ravan Baku	Zaqatala
15:00 AZT (UTC+4)	R.Eyyubov 13'; Ćeran 31'	Summary		Stadium: Zaqatala City Stadium; Attendance: 500; Referee: Omar Paşayev

23 March 2014 27	Ravan Baku	0 – 1	Neftchi Baku	Baku
17:00 AZT (UTC+4)	Balokog (yellow card) 65' (yellow-red card) 70'	Summary	R.Gurbanov 10'	Stadium: Bayil Stadium; Attendance: 300; Referee: Ramil Diniyev

31 March 2014 28	Inter Baku	3 – 0	Ravan Baku	Baku
17:00 AZST (UTC+5)	Tskhadadze 24'; Iashvili 66'; Álvaro 90+3'	Summary		Stadium: Shafa Stadium; Attendance: 700; Referee: Ellvin Äsgärov

5 April 2014 29	Ravan Baku	1 – 1	Sumgayit	Baku
17:00 AZST (UTC+5)	Miracema 68'	Summary	Kurbanov 23'	Stadium: Bayil Stadium; Attendance: 650; Referee: Orkhan Mämmädov

12 April 2014 30	Qarabağ	5 – 1	Ravan Baku	Baku
18:30 AZST (UTC+5)	George 34', 65'; Muarem 62'; Richard 71'; Reynaldo 90' (pen.)	Summary	Miracema 68'; O.Lalayev (yellow card) 57' (yellow-red card) 89'	Stadium: Tofiq Bahramov Stadium^{1} Attendance: 1,000; Referee: Alik Yunusov

20 April 2014 31	Ravan Baku	1 – 2	Gabala	Baku
17:00 AZST (UTC+5)	Y.Ağakärimzadä 85'	Summary	Mendy 38'; U.Abbasov 41'	Stadium: Bayil Stadium; Attendance: 300; Referee: Vusal Äliyev

27 April 2014 32	AZAL	0 – 0	Ravan Baku	Baku
17:00 AZST (UTC+5)		Summary		Stadium: AZAL Arena; Attendance: 200; Referee: Rauf Jabbarov

2 May 2014 33	Khazar Lankaran	4 – 0	Ravan Baku	Lankaran
18:00 AZST (UTC+5)	Elias 19'; Blaževski 52'; E.Abdullayev 53'; Etame 61'	Summary		Stadium: Lankaran City Stadium; Attendance: 1,500; Referee: Elvin Äsgärov

7 May 2014 34	Ravan Baku	1 – 0	Simurq	Baku
18:00 AZST (UTC+5)	Varea 28' (pen.)	Summary	Qirtimov (yellow card) 63' (yellow-red card) 73'	Stadium: Bayil Stadium; Attendance: 500; Referee: Omar Paşayev

12 May 2014 35	Neftchi Baku	2 – 1	Ravan Baku	Baku
18:00 AZST (UTC+5)	Bertucci 45'; Shukurov 88'	Summary	Balokog 8'	Stadium: Ismat Gayibov Stadium; Attendance: 1,000; Referee: Orkhan Mämmädov

17 May 2014 36	Ravan Baku	2 – 3	Baku	Baku
17:00 AZST (UTC+5)	Adamović 90'; Varea 90+4'	Summary	Aliyev 23'; Šolić 83'; T.Gurbatov 90+1'	Stadium: Bayil Stadium; Attendance: 200; Referee: Rahim Häsänov

==== League table ====
Pos	Team	Pld	W	D	L	GF	GA	GD	Pts	Qualification or relegation
6	Khazar Lankaran	36	12	13	11	44	49	−5	49	
7	Simurq	36	11	13	12	35	28	+7	46	
8	AZAL	36	6	13	17	29	49	−20	31	
9	Sumgayit	36	5	10	21	27	61	−34	25	
10	Ravan Baku (R)	36	4	10	22	22	66	−44	22	Relegation to Azerbaijan First Division

Source: Azerbaijan Professional Football league
Rules for classification: 1) points; 2) goal difference; 3) number of goals scored.
(R) Relegated

=== Azerbaijan Cup ===
4 December 2013 Second Round	Qaradağ	2 – 5	Ravan Baku	Baku
12:00 AZT (UTC+4)	R.Mammadov 21'; E.Jafarov (red card) 36'; A.Hasanov 60' (pen.)	Summary	Pecha 19'; Garaev 27', 90+3'; E.Abdulov 40' (pen.); Abdullayev 64'	Stadium: Bayil Stadium; Attendance: 200; Referee: Omar Paşayev

12 March 2014 Quarterfinals 1st leg	Ravan Baku	0 – 1	Baku	Baku
15:00 AZT (UTC+4)		Summary	Huseynov 29'	Stadium: Bayil Stadium; Attendance: 300; Referee: Orkhan Mämmädov

19 March 2014 Quarterfinals 2nd leg	Baku	0 – 1 (a.e.t.) (1 – 1 agg.) (8 – 9 p)	Ravan Baku	Baku
14:00 AZT (UTC+4)		Summary	E.Hasanliyev 85'	Stadium: Tofik Bakhramov Stadium; Attendance: 300; Referee: Elvin Äsgärov
	Penalties
	Penalty scored Penalty missed		Penalty scored

16 April 2014 Semifinals 1st leg	Neftchi Baku	1 – 1	Ravan Baku	Baku
19:00 AZST (UTC+5)	Abdullayev 52'	Summary	Miracema 90+3'	Stadium: Bakcell Arena; Attendance: 1,500; Referee: Rauf Jabbarov

24 April 2014 Semifinals 2nd leg	Ravan Baku	1 – 3 (2 – 4 agg.)	Neftchi Baku	Baku
17:00 AZST (UTC+5)	Varea 17'	Summary	R. Gurbanov 9'; Flavinho 18'; Bertucci 55'	Stadium: Bayil Stadium; Attendance: 500; Referee: Aliyar Ağayev

== Squad statistics ==
As of Match Played 17 May 2014

=== Appearances and goals ===
No.	Pos	Nat	Player	Total		Premier League		Azerbaijan Cup	
No.	Pos	Nat	Player	Apps	Goals	Apps	Goals	Apps	Goals
1	GK	(Poland) POL	Łukasz Sapela	29	0	26+0	0	3+0	0
4	DF	(Slovenia) SLO	Mitja Mörec	19	0	15+0	0	4+0	0
6	MF	(Azerbaijan) AZE	Jeyhun Javadov	20	1	12+8	1	0+0	0
7	MF	(Azerbaijan) AZE	Elvin Hasanliyev	17	1	6+7	0	1+3	1
8	DF	(Brazil) BRA	Júlio César	16	0	13+0	0	3+0	0
9	FW	(Azerbaijan) AZE	Elnur Abdulov	16	1	9+6	0	1+0	1
10	FW	(Brazil) BRA	Thiago Miracema	15	4	9+3	3	0+3	1
11	MF	(Azerbaijan) AZE	Kamil Nurähmädov	12	1	3+8	1	1+0	0
14	FW	(Argentina) ARG	Juan Varea	32	4	25+4	3	1+2	1
15	DF	(Estonia) EST	Dmitri Kruglov	8	0	5+1	0	2+0	0
16	MF	(Azerbaijan) AZE	Orkhan Lalayev	20	1	16+0	1	3+1	0
17	DF	(Azerbaijan) AZE	Ramazan Abbasov	27	1	19+6	1	1+1	0
18	FW	(Nigeria) NGR	Oke Akpoveta	15	1	9+2	1	4+0	0
19	MF	(Azerbaijan) AZE	Huseyn Akhundov	26	1	12+11	1	3+0	0
20	MF	(Serbia) SRB	Miloš Adamović	29	5	24+3	5	2+0	0
21	DF	(Azerbaijan) AZE	Novruz Mammadov	34	0	29+1	0	4+0	0
22	MF	(Azerbaijan) AZE	Tofig Mikayilov	1	0	1+0	0	0+0	0
24	DF	(Azerbaijan) AZE	Yamin Ağakärimzadä	9	1	2+6	1	0+1	0
25	MF	(Azerbaijan) AZE	Ayaz Mehdiyev	18	0	8+5	0	4+1	0
28	DF	(Bosnia and Herzegovina) BIH	Bojan Marković	13	0	10+2	0	1+0	0
30	MF	(Azerbaijan) AZE	Jamshid Maharramov	33	0	25+4	0	3+1	0
40	MF	(Cameroon) CMR	Michel Balokog	35	1	25+5	1	5+0	0
41	MF	(Slovakia) SVK	Kamil Kopúnek	14	0	11+0	0	2+1	0
85	GK	(Azerbaijan) AZE	Kamal Bayramov	13	0	10+1	0	2+0	0
Players who appeared for Ravan Baku no longer at the club:
4	DF	(Azerbaijan) AZE	Nodar Mammadov	3	0	3+0	0	0+0	0
5	DF	(Azerbaijan) AZE	Agil Nabiyev	13	0	13+0	0	0+0	0
10	FW	(Sweden) SWE	Sebastian Castro-Tello	9	2	9+0	2	0+0	0
13	MF	(Azerbaijan) AZE	Shahriyar Rahimov	4	0	4+0	0	0+0	0
18	FW	(Azerbaijan) AZE	Bakhtiyar Soltanov	2	0	0+2	0	0+0	0
23	MF	(Argentina) ARG	Cristian Torres	6	0	3+3	0	0+0	0
27	MF	(Azerbaijan) AZE	Rashad Abdullayev	16	1	13+2	0	1+0	1
29	DF	(Azerbaijan) AZE	Aziz Guliyev	2	0	2+0	0	0+0	0
33	DF	(Tajikistan) TJK	Sokhib Suvonkulov	8	1	5+2	1	1+0	0
35	MF	(Sweden) SWE	Fredrik Holster	6	0	1+4	0	1+0	0
38	DF	(Slovakia) SVK	Ivan Pecha	18	1	17+0	0	1+0	1
89	MF	(Azerbaijan) AZE	Vusal Garaev	4	2	0+3	0	1+0	2

=== Goal scorers ===
Place	Position	Nation	Number	Name	Premier League	Azerbaijan Cup	Total
1	MF	(Serbia)	20	Miloš Adamović	5	0	5
2	FW	(Brazil)	10	Thiago Miracema	3	1	4
2	FW	(Argentina)	14	Juan Varea	3	1	4
4	FW	(Sweden)	10	Sebastian Castro-Tello	2	0	2
4	MF	(Azerbaijan)	89	Vusal Garaev	0	2	2
6	MF	(Azerbaijan)	11	Kamil Nurähmädov	1	0	1
6	DF	(Tajikistan)	33	Sokhib Suvonkulov	1	0	1
6	DF	(Azerbaijan)	17	Ramazan Abbasov	1	0	1
6	MF	(Azerbaijan)	6	Jeyhun Javadov	1	0	1
6	MF	(Azerbaijan)	19	Huseyn Akhundov	1	0	1
6	FW	(Nigeria)	18	Oke Akpoveta	1	0	1
6	MF	(Azerbaijan)	16	Orkhan Lalayev	1	0	1
6	DF	(Azerbaijan)	24	Yamin Ağakärimzadä	1	0	1
6	MF	(Cameroon)	40	Michel Balokog	1	0	1
6	MF	(Azerbaijan)	27	Rashad Abdullayev	0	1	1
6	DF	(Czech Republic)	38	Ivan Pecha	0	1	1
6	FW	(Azerbaijan)	9	Elnur Abdulov	0	1	1
6	MF	(Azerbaijan)	7	Elvin Hasanliyev	0	1	1
				TOTALS	22	8	30

=== Disciplinary record ===
Number	Nation	Position	Name	Premier League		Azerbaijan Cup		Total	
Number	Nation	Position	Name	Yellow card	Red card	Yellow card	Red card	Yellow card	Red card
1	(Poland)	GK	Łukasz Sapela	1	1	0	0	1	1
4	(Slovenia)	DF	Mitja Mörec	4	0	1	0	5	0
5	(Azerbaijan)	DF	Agil Nabiyev	2	0	0	0	2	0
6	(Azerbaijan)	MF	Jeyhun Javadov	5	0	0	0	5	0
8	(Brazil)	DF	Júlio César	4	0	0	0	4	0
9	(Azerbaijan)	FW	Elnur Abdulov	1	0	0	0	1	0
10	(Sweden)	FW	Sebastian Castro-Tello	1	0	0	0	1	0
10	(Brazil)	FW	Thiago Miracema	1	0	1	0	2	0
13	(Azerbaijan)	MF	Shahriyar Rahimov	2	0	0	0	2	0
14	(Argentina)	FW	Juan Varea	2	0	0	0	2	0
16	(Azerbaijan)	MF	Orkhan Lalayev	4	1	2	0	6	1
17	(Azerbaijan)	DF	Ramazan Abbasov	5	1	0	0	5	1
18	(Nigeria)	FW	Oke Akpoveta	6	0	1	0	7	0
19	(Azerbaijan)	MF	Huseyn Akhundov	7	1	1	0	8	1
20	(Serbia)	MF	Miloš Adamović	10	1	0	0	10	1
21	(Azerbaijan)	DF	Novruz Mammadov	12	0	0	0	12	0
23	(Argentina)	MF	Cristian Torres	2	0	0	0	2	0
24	(Azerbaijan)	DF	Yamin Ağakärimzadä	3	0	0	0	3	0
25	(Azerbaijan)	MF	Ayaz Mehdiyev	2	0	0	0	2	0
27	(Azerbaijan)	MF	Rashad Abdullayev	5	1	0	0	5	1
28	(Bosnia and Herzegovina)	DF	Bojan Marković	3	0	0	0	3	0
29	(Azerbaijan)	DF	Aziz Guliyev	1	0	0	0	1	0
30	(Azerbaijan)	MF	Jamshid Maharramov	9	1	2	0	11	1
33	(Tajikistan)	DF	Sokhib Suvonkulov	2	0	0	0	2	0
35	(Sweden)	MF	Fredrik Holster	0	0	1	0	1	0
38	(Slovakia)	DF	Ivan Pecha	4	0	0	0	4	0
40	(Cameroon)	MF	Michel Balokog	10	2	1	0	11	2
41	(Slovakia)	MF	Kamil Kopúnek	1	0	2	0	3	0
85	(Azerbaijan)	GK	Kamal Bayramov	3	0	0	0	3	0
			TOTALS	112	9	12	0	124	9
