= List of Azerbaijan football transfers winter 2014 =

This is a list of Azerbaijan football transfers in the winter transfer window 2014 by club. Only clubs of the 2013–14 Azerbaijan Premier League are included.

== Azerbaijan Premier League 2013-14 ==
=== AZAL ===
In: Note: Flags indicate national team as defined under FIFA eligibility rules; some limited exceptions apply. Players may hold more than one non-FIFA nationality.

No.	Pos.	Nation	Player
16	GK	AZE	Elchin Sadigov (from (Azerbaijan) Sumgayit)
22	FW	TJK	Akhtam Khamroqulov (from (Tajikistan) Regar-TadAZ)
26	FW	AZE	Karim Diniyev (from (Azerbaijan) Neftchi Baku)
27	MF	AZE	Rashad Abdullayev (from (Azerbaijan) Baku, previously on loan Ravan Baku)
32	DF	GEO	Lasha Kasradze (from (Georgia (country)) WIT Georgia)
89	FW	BIH	Nedo Turković (from (Kazakhstan) Akzhayik)
—	MF	AZE	Orkhan Safiyaroglu (from (Azerbaijan) Simurq)

Out: Note: Flags indicate national team as defined under FIFA eligibility rules; some limited exceptions apply. Players may hold more than one non-FIFA nationality.

No.	Pos.	Nation	Player
16	FW	SWE	Freddy Borg (to (Sweden) Trelleborgs FF)
22	MF	AZE	Ruslan Tagizade (to (Azerbaijan) Gabala)
30	FW	UKR	Yuriy Fomenko
32	MF	SRB	Vladimir Bogdanović

=== Baku ===
In: Note: Flags indicate national team as defined under FIFA eligibility rules; some limited exceptions apply. Players may hold more than one non-FIFA nationality.

No.	Pos.	Nation	Player
—	DF	AZE	Aziz Guliyev (loan return from (Azerbaijan) Ravan Baku)
—	MF	AZE	Rashad Abdullayev (loan return from (Azerbaijan) Ravan Baku)
—	FW	AZE	Nurlan Novruzov (loan return from (Azerbaijan) Sumgayit)

Out: Note: Flags indicate national team as defined under FIFA eligibility rules; some limited exceptions apply. Players may hold more than one non-FIFA nationality.

No.	Pos.	Nation	Player
20	MF	LTU	Mindaugas Kalonas (loan to (Azerbaijan) Simurq)
27	MF	AZE	Rahman Hajiyev (to (Azerbaijan) Sumgayit)
29	GK	AZE	Kamran Aghayev (to (Azerbaijan) Gabala)
—	DF	AZE	Aziz Guliyev
—	MF	AZE	Rashad Abdullayev (to (Azerbaijan) AZAL)
—	FW	AZE	Nurlan Novruzov (to (Turkey) Fethiyespor)

=== Gabala ===
In: Note: Flags indicate national team as defined under FIFA eligibility rules; some limited exceptions apply. Players may hold more than one non-FIFA nationality.

No.	Pos.	Nation	Player
1	GK	AZE	Kamran Aghayev (from (Azerbaijan) Baku)
7	MF	RUS	Marat Izmailov (loan from (Portugal) F.C. Porto)
16	MF	AZE	Ruslan Tagizade (from (Azerbaijan) AZAL)
30	GK	AZE	Anar Nazirov (from (Azerbaijan) Sumgayit)
36	DF	AZE	Elnur Allahverdiyev (from (Azerbaijan) Khazar Lankaran, previously on loan)
44	DF	BRA	Rafael Santos (from (Ukraine) Arsenal Kyiv)
—	DF	TJK	Davron Ergashev (from (Kazakhstan) Zhetysu)

Out: Note: Flags indicate national team as defined under FIFA eligibility rules; some limited exceptions apply. Players may hold more than one non-FIFA nationality.

No.	Pos.	Nation	Player
7	MF	AZE	Tarzin Jahangirov (loan to (Azerbaijan) Sumgayit)
23	DF	AZE	Shahriyar Khalilov (to (Azerbaijan) Sumgayit)
84	DF	SVN	Dejan Kelhar (to (Serbia) Red Star Belgrade)

=== Inter Baku ===
In: Note: Flags indicate national team as defined under FIFA eligibility rules; some limited exceptions apply. Players may hold more than one non-FIFA nationality.

No.	Pos.	Nation	Player
12	MF	CZE	Ivo Táborský (loan from (Czech Republic) Teplice)
15	DF	FRA	Yohan Bocognano (from (France) FC Istres)
27	MF	CRC	Diego Madrigal (from (Costa Rica) Saprissa)

Out: Note: Flags indicate national team as defined under FIFA eligibility rules; some limited exceptions apply. Players may hold more than one non-FIFA nationality.

No.	Pos.	Nation	Player
10	MF	BUL	Daniel Genov (to (Bulgaria) Lokomotiv Sofia)
17	FW	AZE	Ramil Mansurov (to (Azerbaijan) Sumgayit)
22	FW	MKD	Ilčo Naumoski (to (North Macedonia) Vardar)
44	DF	BRA	João Paulo (to (Brazil) Atlético Sorocaba)

=== Khazar Lankaran ===
In: Note: Flags indicate national team as defined under FIFA eligibility rules; some limited exceptions apply. Players may hold more than one non-FIFA nationality.

No.	Pos.	Nation	Player
2	DF	AZE	Slavik Alkhasov (from (Azerbaijan) Neftchi Baku)
5	DF	BRA	Thiego (from (Brazil) Figueirense)
8	MF	MKD	Dejan Blaževski (from (North Macedonia) Turnovo)
9	FW	AZE	Orkhan Aliyev (from (Azerbaijan) Sumgayit)
19	GK	CRO	Vjekoslav Tomić (from (Moldova) Sheriff Tiraspol)
16	MF	ROU	Adrian Piț (Re-signed)
30	MF	BRA	Elias (from (Brazil) Atlético Paranaense)

Out: Note: Flags indicate national team as defined under FIFA eligibility rules; some limited exceptions apply. Players may hold more than one non-FIFA nationality.

No.	Pos.	Nation	Player
5	DF	AZE	Elnur Allahverdiyev (to (Azerbaijan) Gabala, previously on loan)
8	MF	ESP	Eduard Oriol (to (Cyprus) AEL Limassol)
9	MF	AZE	Uğur Pamuk (loan to (Azerbaijan) Sumgayit)
17	MF	AZE	Kazım Kazımlı
21	DF	BUL	Radomir Todorov (to (Bulgaria) Spartak Varna)
33	GK	BRA	Douglas (to (Brazil) Guarani)

=== Neftchi Baku ===
In: Note: Flags indicate national team as defined under FIFA eligibility rules; some limited exceptions apply. Players may hold more than one non-FIFA nationality.

No.	Pos.	Nation	Player
8	MF	AZE	Elshan Abdullayev (loan return from (Azerbaijan) Sumgayit)
20	DF	AZE	Slavik Alkhasov (loan return from (Azerbaijan) Sumgayit)
21	MF	AZE	Samir Masimov (from (Russia) Lokomotiv Moscow)
26	DF	AZE	Karim Diniyev (loan return from (Azerbaijan) Sumgayit)
—	FW	AZE	Ruslan Qurbanov (loan return from (Azerbaijan) Sumgayit)
—	DF	AZE	Elvin Badalov (from (Russia) Zenit St. Petersburg)

Out: Note: Flags indicate national team as defined under FIFA eligibility rules; some limited exceptions apply. Players may hold more than one non-FIFA nationality.

No.	Pos.	Nation	Player
11	FW	NED	Melvin Platje (on loan to (Sweden) Kalmar)
12	GK	AZE	Emil Balayev (on loan to (Azerbaijan) Araz Naxchivan)
20	DF	AZE	Slavik Alkhasov (to (Azerbaijan) Khazar Lankaran)
26	DF	AZE	Karim Diniyev (to (Azerbaijan) AZAL)

=== Qarabağ ===
In: Note: Flags indicate national team as defined under FIFA eligibility rules; some limited exceptions apply. Players may hold more than one non-FIFA nationality.

No.	Pos.	Nation	Player
19	FW	GEO	Jaba Dvali (loan from (Georgia (country)) Dinamo Tbilisi)

Out: Note: Flags indicate national team as defined under FIFA eligibility rules; some limited exceptions apply. Players may hold more than one non-FIFA nationality.

No.	Pos.	Nation	Player
3	DF	AZE	Kamil Huseynov (to (Azerbaijan) Sumgayit, previously on loan to Neftchala)
12	GK	AZE	Osman Umarov (retired)
19	MF	AZE	Murad Sattarli (to (Azerbaijan) Simurq)
89	GK	CRO	Miro Varvodić (to (Hungary) Győri ETO)

=== Ravan Baku ===
In: Note: Flags indicate national team as defined under FIFA eligibility rules; some limited exceptions apply. Players may hold more than one non-FIFA nationality.

No.	Pos.	Nation	Player
4	DF	SVN	Mitja Mörec (from (Kazakhstan) Kaisar)
8	DF	BRA	Júlio César (from (Brazil) Central)
10	MF	BRA	Thiago Miracema (from (Brazil) Sampaio Corrêa)
15	DF	EST	Dmitri Kruglov (from (Estonia) Levadia)
18	FW	NGA	Oke Akpoveta (from (Denmark) Brøndby)
28	DF	BIH	Bojan Marković (from (Israel) Hapoel Be'er Sheva)
41	MF	SVK	Kamil Kopúnek (from (Slovakia) Slovan Bratislava)

Out: Note: Flags indicate national team as defined under FIFA eligibility rules; some limited exceptions apply. Players may hold more than one non-FIFA nationality.

No.	Pos.	Nation	Player
5	DF	AZE	Agil Nabiyev
10	FW	SWE	Sebastian Castro-Tello (loan return to (Sweden) Hammarby IF)
23	MF	ARG	Cristián Torres (to (Latvia) Liepājas Metalurgs)
27	MF	AZE	Rashad Abdullayev (loan return to (Azerbaijan) Baku)
29	DF	AZE	Aziz Guliyev (loan return to (Azerbaijan) Baku)
33	DF	TJK	Sokhib Suvonkulov
35	MF	SWE	Fredrik Holster (to (Sweden) Assyriska)
38	DF	SVK	Ivan Pecha (to (Latvia) Liepājas Metalurgs)
89	MF	AZE	Vusal Garaev

=== Simurq ===
In: Note: Flags indicate national team as defined under FIFA eligibility rules; some limited exceptions apply. Players may hold more than one non-FIFA nationality.

No.	Pos.	Nation	Player
9	MF	LTU	Mindaugas Kalonas (loan from (Azerbaijan) Baku)
21	MF	AZE	Murad Sattarly (from (Azerbaijan) Qarabağ)
26	MF	BEL	Benjamin Lambot (from (Belgium) Lierse)
—	DF	AZE	Nduka Usim (from (Turkey) Tavşanlı Linyitspor)

Out: Note: Flags indicate national team as defined under FIFA eligibility rules; some limited exceptions apply. Players may hold more than one non-FIFA nationality.

No.	Pos.	Nation	Player
9	FW	AZE	Rovshan Amiraslanov
19	MF	AZE	Orkhan Safiyaroglu (to (Azerbaijan) AZAL)
28	MF	BIH	Nenad Kiso

=== Sumgayit ===
In: Note: Flags indicate national team as defined under FIFA eligibility rules; some limited exceptions apply. Players may hold more than one non-FIFA nationality.

No.	Pos.	Nation	Player
1	GK	AZE	Andrey Popoviç (from (Turkey) Tavşanlı Linyitspor)
2	DF	AZE	Shahriyar Khalilov (from (Azerbaijan) Gabala)
5	DF	AZE	Kamil Huseynov (from (Azerbaijan) Qarabağ)
9	MF	AZE	Tarzin Jahangirov (loan from (Azerbaijan) Gabala)
10	MF	AZE	Uğur Pamuk (loan from (Azerbaijan) Khazar Lankaran)
14	MF	RUS	Magomed Kurbanov (from (Russia) Taganrog)
77	FW	AZE	Ramil Mansurov (from (Azerbaijan) Inter Baku)
99	MF	AZE	Rahman Hajiyev (from (Azerbaijan) Baku)

Out: Note: Flags indicate national team as defined under FIFA eligibility rules; some limited exceptions apply. Players may hold more than one non-FIFA nationality.

No.	Pos.	Nation	Player
1	GK	AZE	Anar Nazirov (to (Azerbaijan) Gabala)
2	DF	AZE	Slavik Alkhasov (loan return to (Azerbaijan) Neftchi Baku)
5	DF	AZE	Karim Diniyev (loan return to (Azerbaijan) Neftchi Baku)
9	FW	AZE	Orkhan Aliyev (to (Azerbaijan) Khazar Lankaran)
10	FW	AZE	Ruslan Qurbanov (loan return to (Azerbaijan) Neftchi Baku)
12	GK	AZE	Elchin Sadigov (to (Azerbaijan) AZAL)
20	FW	AZE	Sabir Allahquliyev
22	DF	AZE	Zaur Hashimov
27	FW	AZE	Nurlan Novruzov (loan return to (Azerbaijan) Baku)
88	MF	AZE	Elshan Abdullayev (loan return to (Azerbaijan) Neftchi Baku)
91	FW	AZE	Vugar Asgarov
