= Michel Nack Balokog =

Cameroonian footballer

Personal information
- Full name: Michel Nack Balokog
- Date of birth: September 10, 1986 (age 40)
- Place of birth: Douala, Cameroon
- Height: 1.83 m (6 ft 0 in)
- Position: Midfielder

Senior career*
Years	Team	Apps	(Gls)
2008–2012	Coton Sport		
2012–2013	Domžale	21	(0)
2013–2014	Ravan Baku	30	(1)
- * Club domestic league appearances and goals as of 19 May 2014

Michel Nack Balokog (born September 10, 1986) is a Cameroonian football midfielder whose last known club was Ravan Baku in the Azerbaijan Premier League.

== Career ==
Balokog started his professional career with Coton Sport in his native Cameroon, where he won the national championship twice and the national cup twice.

During the 2011–12 winter transfer window, Balokog joined Slovenian 1. SNL team Domžale.

In August 2013 Balokog signed for Azerbaijan Premier League side Ravan Baku. Balokog made his debut for Ravan Baku in their second game of the 2013–14 season, a 0–2 home defeat against Neftchi Baku.

== Career statistics ==
As of Match played 17 May 2014

Club statistics
Season	Club	League	League		Cup		Other		Total	
Season	Club	League	App	Goals	App	Goals	App	Goals	App	Goals
2011-12	Domžale	1. SNL	7	0	0	0	—		7	0
2012-13	Domžale	1. SNL	14	0	1	0	—		15	0
2013-14	Domžale	1. SNL	0	0	0	0	0	0	0	0
2013–14	Ravan Baku	Azerbaijan Premier League	30	1	5	0	—		35	1
Total	Slovenia		21	0	1	0	0	0	22	0
Total	Azerbaijan		30	1	5	0	0	0	35	1
Career total			51	1	6	0	0	0	57	1

== Honours ==
=== Player ===
Coton Sport

- Elite One (2) - 2009/10, 2010/11
- Cameroonian Cup (2) - 2008, 2011
