= 2015–16 Ravan Baku FK season =

Ravan Baku
2015-16 season
- President: Mushfig Safiyev
- Manager: Emin Quliyev (until 17 October); Bahman Hasanov (from 17 October)
- Stadium: Bayil Stadium
- Premier League: 10th
- Azerbaijan Cup: Quarterfinal vs Inter Baku
- Top goalscorer: League: Tural Gurbatov (4); All: Tural Gurbatov (4)

The Ravan Baku FK 2015-16 season was Ravan's first season back in the Azerbaijan Premier League, following their relegation at the end of the 2013–14 season, and seventh in their history. It was their first season with Emin Quliyev as manager, during which they participated in the Azerbaijan Cup as well as the League.

== Season events ==
On 17 October, Emin Quliyev resigned as manager and was replaced with Bahman Hasanov.

== Squad ==
As of 31 January 2016

Note: Flags indicate national team as defined under FIFA eligibility rules; some limited exceptions apply. Players may hold more than one non-FIFA nationality.

No.	Pos.	Nation	Player
1	GK	AZE	Rashad Azizli
2	DF	AZE	Ruslan Tagizade
3	DF	AZE	Saşa Yunisoğlu
4	DF	AZE	Kanan Muslumov
5	MF	AZE	Mirkmail Hashimli
6	DF	AZE	Vugar Baybalayev
7	MF	AZE	Elvin Hasanaliyev
8	MF	AZE	Mammad Quliyev
9	MF	AZE	Nuran Gurbanov
11	MF	AZE	Elnur Abdulov
13	MF	AZE	Jamshid Maharramov
14	DF	AZE	Elvin Aliyev

No.	Pos.	Nation	Player
16	DF	AZE	Orkhan Lalayev
17	MF	AZE	Ramazan Abbasov
21	DF	AZE	Novruz Mammadov
22	DF	AZE	Elmin Aghayev
24	MF	AZE	Elchin Ismayilov
55	DF	AZE	Huseyn Akhundov
86	FW	UKR	Yasyn Khamid
96	GK	AZE	Aydin Bayramov
92	DF	AZE	Yamin Ağakarimzada
97	MF	AZE	Anar Hasanov
99	MF	AZE	Aziz Huseynov

== Transfers ==
=== Summer ===
In: Note: Flags indicate national team as defined under FIFA eligibility rules; some limited exceptions apply. Players may hold more than one non-FIFA nationality.

No.	Pos.	Nation	Player
1	GK	AZE	Rashad zizli (from (Azerbaijan) Simurq)
2	MF	AZE	Ruslan Tagizade (from (Azerbaijan) Gabala)
3	DF	AZE	Saşa Yunisoğlu
4	DF	AZE	Kanan Muslumov (from (Azerbaijan) Simurq)
6	DF	AZE	Vugar Baybalayev (from (Azerbaijan) Baku)
10	MF	LTU	Mindaugas Kalonas (from (Latvia) Skonto)
10	MF	UZB	Alibobo Rakhmatullaev (from (Uzbekistan) Navbahor Namangan)
11	DF	SLE	Sheriff Suma (from (Sweden) Syrianska IF Kerburan)
14	DF	AZE	Elvin Aliyev (from (Azerbaijan) Baku)
13	MF	AZE	Jamshid Maharramov (from (Turkey) Adanaspor)
16	DF	AZE	Orkhan Lalayev (loan return from (Azerbaijan) AZAL)
17	MF	AZE	Ramazan Abbasov (from (Azerbaijan) Baku)
18	MF	SLE	Samuel Barlay (from (Sweden) Syrianska IF Kerburan)
19	FW	AZE	Tural Gurbatov (loan from (Azerbaijan) Inter Baku)
21	DF	AZE	Novruz Mammadov (from (Azerbaijan) Inter Baku)
22	FW	AZE	Mahammad Aliyev (from (Azerbaijan) Neftchala)
25	FW	AZE	Oruj Balashli (from (Azerbaijan) Simurq)
32	GK	UKR	Kostyantyn Makhnovskyi
77	MF	AZE	Cavad Kazımov (from (Azerbaijan) Simurq)
86	FW	AZE	Farid Guliyev (from (Azerbaijan) Sumgayit)
88	MF	AZE	Roini Ismayilov (from (Azerbaijan) Simurq)
99	MF	AZE	Nicat Muxtarov (from (Azerbaijan) Simurq)

Out: Note: Flags indicate national team as defined under FIFA eligibility rules; some limited exceptions apply. Players may hold more than one non-FIFA nationality.

No.	Pos.	Nation	Player
10	MF	UZB	Alibobo Rakhmatullaev
10	MF	LTU	Mindaugas Kalonas (to (Israel) Hapoel Nazareth Illit)
18	MF	SLE	Samuel Barlay
—	GK	AZE	Tural Abbaszade (to (Azerbaijan) Sumgayit)
—	DF	AZE	Tural Narimanov (to (Azerbaijan) AZAL)
—	MF	AZE	Jeyhun Javadov (to (Azerbaijan) Kapaz)

=== Winter ===
In: Note: Flags indicate national team as defined under FIFA eligibility rules; some limited exceptions apply. Players may hold more than one non-FIFA nationality.

No.	Pos.	Nation	Player
5	MF	AZE	Mirkamil Hashimli (from (Azerbaijan) Zira)
9	MF	AZE	Nuran Gurbanov (from (Azerbaijan) Sumgayit)
11	MF	AZE	Elnur Abdulov (from (Azerbaijan) Sumgayit)
22	DF	AZE	Elmin Aghayev (from (Azerbaijan) Sharurspor)
86	FW	UKR	Yasyn Khamid (Free agent)
99	MF	AZE	Aziz Huseynov (from (Azerbaijan) Shamkir)

Out: Note: Flags indicate national team as defined under FIFA eligibility rules; some limited exceptions apply. Players may hold more than one non-FIFA nationality.

No.	Pos.	Nation	Player
11	DF	SLE	Sheriff Suma
19	FW	AZE	Tural Gurbatov (loan return to (Azerbaijan) Inter Baku)
20	MF	AZE	Kanan Manafov (to (Azerbaijan) Sumgayit)
22	FW	AZE	Mahammad Aliyev
32	GK	UKR	Kostyantyn Makhnovskyi
77	MF	AZE	Javad Kazimov (to (Azerbaijan) Neftchala)
86	FW	AZE	Farid Guliyev (to (Turkey) Yozgatspor)
88	MF	AZE	Roini Ismayilov (to (Azerbaijan) Neftchala)
99	MF	AZE	Nijat Mukhtarov (to (Azerbaijan) Sumgayit)

== Competitions ==
=== Azerbaijan Premier League ===
==== Results summary ====
Overall								Home						Away					
Pld	W	D	L	GF	GA	GD	Pts	W	D	L	GF	GA	GD	W	D	L	GF	GA	GD
36	5	9	22	27	63	−36	24	4	3	11	11	30	−19	1	6	11	16	33	−17

Last updated: 20 May 2016.
Source: Soccerway

==== Results ====
10 August 2015 1	Ravan Baku	0 – 0	Sumgayit	Baku
21:00 AZST (UTC+5)	Barlay (yellow card) 16'; Y.Ağakärimzadä (yellow card) 79'; J.Kazimov (yellow card) 90+2'; R.Tagizade (yellow card) 90+4'	Report	Pamuk (yellow card) 37'; A.Ramazanov (red card) 40'; T.Mikayilov (yellow card) 86'; Mammadov (yellow card) 90+4'	Stadium: Bayil Stadium; Attendance: 1,000; Referee: Ingilab Mämmädov

15 August 2015 2	Ravan Baku	1 – 2	Qarabağ	Baku
21:00 AZST (UTC+5)	Y.Ağakärimzadä (yellow card) 75'; T.Gurbatov 88'	Report	Yunuszade (yellow card) 27'; V.Mustafayev (yellow card) 38'; J.Diniyev (yellow card) 59'; Y.Ağakärimzadä 67' (o.g.); Garayev 83'	Stadium: Bayil Stadium; Attendance: 1,000; Referee: Ramil Diniyev

22 August 2015 3	Khazar Lankaran	1 – 1	Ravan Baku	Lankaran
21:00 AZST (UTC+5)	E. Rzazadä (yellow card) 23' (yellow-red card) 48'; Scarlatache (yellow card) 30' (yellow-red card) 90+1'; Amirguliyev 87' (pen.) (yellow card) 87'	Report	Y. Ağakärimzadä (yellow card) 34'; Barlay (yellow card) 50'; Abbasov 55'; T. Gurbatov (yellow card) 78'; R. Tagizade (yellow card) 81'; N.Mukhtarov (yellow card) 86'	Stadium: Lankaran City Stadium; Attendance: Rähim Häsänov; Referee: 9,500

13 September 2015 4	Ravan Baku	1 – 3	Neftchi Baku	Baku
21:00 AZST (UTC+5)	Y.Ağakärimzadä (yellow card) 7'; N.Mukhtarov 70'; Barlay (yellow card) 89'	Summary	Ailton (yellow card) 20' (yellow-red card) 56'; F.Muradbayli 24', 82'; R.Hajiyev 40'; R.Mammadov (yellow card) 53'; Cauê (yellow card) 64'	Stadium: Bayil Stadium; Attendance: 500; Referee: Aliyar Ağayev

19 September 2015 5	Zira	2 – 1	Ravan Baku	Baku
21:00 AZST (UTC+5)	Abdullayev 14' (pen.); Krneta 24'; S.Guliyev (yellow card) 52'; V.Igbekoi (yellow card) 58'; Mbah (yellow card) 61' (yellow-red card) 82'	Report	Barlay (yellow card) 11'; Abbasov (yellow card) 20'; T.Gurbatov 62'	Stadium: Zirə Olympic Sport Complex Stadium; Attendance: 1,000; Referee: Rauf Jabbarov

25 September 2015 6	Ravan Baku	0 – 3	Gabala	Baku
20:00 AZST (UTC+5)		Report	Dodô 37'; S.Zargarov 58' (yellow card) 73'; Gai 78'	Stadium: Bayil Stadium; Attendance: 430; Referee: Elvin Äsgärov

2 October 2015 7	AZAL	1 – 0	Ravan Baku	Baku
19:00 AZST (UTC+5)	Kvirtia 7'; T.Novruzov (yellow card) 21'; I.Alakbarov (yellow card) 77'; Jafarguliyev (yellow card) 89'; Namașco (yellow card) 90+1'	Report	N.Mammadov (yellow card) 25'; Suma (yellow card) 61'; Y.Ağakärimzadä (yellow card) 78'	Stadium: AZAL Arena; Attendance: 300; Referee: Rauf Jabbarov

16 October 2015 8	Ravan Baku	0 – 2	Kapaz	Baku
20:30 AZST (UTC+5)	N.Mammadov (yellow card) 11' (yellow-red card) 87'; K.Manafov (yellow card) 33' (yellow-red card) 59'; Makhnovskyi (yellow card) 61'; O.Lalayev (yellow card) 75' (yellow-red card) 90+1'	Report	Dário (yellow card) 35'; Ebah 48'; Juninho 52'; S.Aliyev (yellow card) 61'; J.Javadov (yellow card) 78'; R.Eyyubov (yellow card) 84'	Stadium: Bayil Stadium; Attendance: 200; Referee: Orxan Mämmädov

24 October 2015 9	Inter Baku	2 – 0	Ravan Baku	Baku
18:00 AZST (UTC+5)	Fomenko 32'; Qirtimov 49'	Report	K.Muslumov (yellow card) 47'; Makhnovskyi (yellow card) 49'	Stadium: Inter Arena; Attendance: 500; Referee: Rähim Häsänov

28 October 2015 10	Qarabağ	1 – 0	Ravan Baku	Baku
19:00 AZT (UTC+4)	V.Mustafayev 36'	Report	Y.Ağakärimzadä (yellow card) 40'; N.Mammadov (yellow card) 77'	Stadium: Tofiq Bahramov Stadium^{1} Attendance: 350; Referee: Omar Paşayev

2 November 2015 11	Ravan Baku	0 – 1	Khazar Lankaran	Baku
21:00 AZT (UTC+4)	Suma (yellow card) 56'; E.Hasanaliyev (yellow card) 70'; Y.Ağakärimzadä (yellow card) 79'	Report	S.Tounkara (yellow card) 11'; E.Jäfärov 80'	Stadium: Bayil Stadium; Attendance: 600; Referee: Orxan Mämmädov

8 November 2015 12	Neftchi Baku	2 – 3	Ravan Baku	Baku
18:00 AZT (UTC+4)	Qurbanov (yellow card) 31' (goal) 41', 90'; Peškovič (yellow card) 77'	Report	N.Mukhtarov 47'; Y.Ağakärimzadä 49'; R.Tagizade 65'; Abbasov (yellow card) 77'; M.Quliyev (yellow card) 84'	Stadium: Bakcell Arena; Attendance: 500; Referee: Omar Paşayev

22 November 2015 13	Ravan Baku	1 – 0	Zira	Baku
20:00 AZT (UTC+4)	T.Gurbatov 6' (yellow card) 45'; N.Mammadov (yellow card) 72'; R.Tagizade (yellow card) 83'	Report	V.Igbekoi (yellow card) 12'; A.Shemonayev (yellow card) 28'; T.Khalilzade (yellow card) 72'; Krneta (yellow card) 82'	Stadium: Bayil Stadium; Attendance: 600; Referee: Ramil Diniyev

30 November 2015 14	Gabala	1 – 1	Ravan Baku	Qabala
17:00 AZT (UTC+4)	Mirzabekov (yellow card) 17'; Pereyra 90+5'	Report	Aliyev (yellow card) 34'; T.Gurbatov 66'; Makhnovskyi (yellow card) 72'; V.Baybalayev (yellow card) 78'; Suma (yellow card) 82'; Yunisoğlu (yellow card) 90+3'	Stadium: Gabala City Stadium; Attendance: 1,100; Referee: Rauf Jabbarov

7 December 2015 15	Ravan Baku	0 – 0	AZAL	Baku
20:00 AZT (UTC+4)	T.Gurbatov (yellow card) 37'; K.Muslumov (yellow card) 66'; Yunisoğlu (yellow card) 76'; C.Abdullayev (yellow card) 83'	Report	K.Mirzayev (yellow card) 26'; Malikov (yellow card) 55'	Stadium: Bayil Stadium; Attendance: 1,000; Referee: Rahim Häsänov

11 December 2015 16	Kapaz	0 – 0	Ravan Baku	Ganja
14:00 AZT (UTC+4)	A.Kärimov (yellow card) 66'	Report	O.Lalayev (yellow card) 34'; E.Hasanaliyev (yellow card) 52'; Suma (yellow card) 66'; N.Mammadov (yellow card) 90+4'	Stadium: Ganja City Stadium; Attendance: 11,000; Referee: Ingilab Mämmädov

15 December 2015 17	Ravan Baku	0 – 2	Inter Baku	Baku
20:30 AZT (UTC+4)	V.Baybalayev (yellow card) 29'; K.Muslumov (yellow card) 68'	Report	Abatsiyev (yellow card) 45'; Khizanishvili 51'; Fomenko (yellow card) 67'; Qirtimov (yellow card) 75'; Seydi 85'; E.Abdullayev (yellow card) 90+3'	Stadium: Bayil Stadium; Attendance: 200; Referee: Rauf Jabbarov

19 December 2015 18	Sumgayit	3 – 3	Ravan Baku	Sumqayit
15:30 AZT (UTC+4)	A.Yunanov 12', 34'; E.Mehdiyev (yellow card) 62' (yellow-red card) 73'; M.Rahimov 90+3'	Report	Suma 27'; R.Tagizade 35'; Abbasov 75' (pen.) (yellow card) 76'; Y.Ağakärimzadä (yellow card) 77'; N.Mammadov (yellow card) 83'; Makhnovskyi (yellow card) 88'	Stadium: Kapital Bank Arena; Attendance: 500; Referee: Orhan Mämmädov

31 January 2016 19	Khazar Lankaran	0 – 0	Ravan Baku	Lankaran
13:30 AZT (UTC+4)	F.Asadov (yellow card) 56'; E.Baləhmədov (yellow card) 70'; I.Gadirzade (yellow card) 82'	Report	Aliyev (yellow card) 18'	Stadium: Lankaran City Stadium; Attendance: 800; Referee: Omar Paşayev

5 February 2016 20	Neftchi Baku	1 – 1	Ravan Baku	Baku
16:30 AZT (UTC+4)	Jairo (yellow card) 38' (yellow-red card) 88' (goal) 83'; Imamverdiyev (yellow card) 44'; Qurbanov (yellow card) 51'	Report	R.Tagizade (yellow card) 16'; N.Mammadov (yellow card) 19'; N.Gurbanov (yellow card) 36'; C.Abdullayev 48'; Khamid (yellow card) 85' (red card) 89'; Yunisoğlu (yellow card) 90+1'; Abbasov (yellow card) 90+5'	Stadium: Bakcell Arena; Attendance: 200; Referee: Elvin Äsgärov

15 February 2016 21	Zira	2 – 1	Ravan Baku	Baku
18:30 AZT (UTC+4)	V.Igbekoi (yellow card) 17'; Bonilla 23', 86' (pen.); T.Khalilzade (yellow card) 63'	Report	K.Muslumov (yellow card) 27' (yellow-red card) 85'; O.Lalayev (yellow card) 71'; Y.Ağakarimzada 83'	Stadium: Zira Olympic Sport Complex Stadium; Attendance: 600; Referee: Ingilab Məmmədov

21 February 2016 22	Ravan Baku	0 – 1	Gabala	Baku
16:30 AZT (UTC+4)		Report	Dashdemirov 77'	Stadium: Bayil Stadium; Attendance: 300; Referee: Ömər Paşayev

27 February 2016 23	AZAL	1 – 0	Ravan Baku	Baku
15:00 AZT (UTC+4)	G.Magomedov (yellow card) 23' (yellow-red card) 51'; Kvirtia 61' (yellow card) 72'; M.Sattarly (yellow card) 81'; Namașco (yellow card) 90+2'	Report	Aliyev (yellow card) 32'; Yunisoğlu (yellow card) 54'; R.Azizli (yellow card) 79'	Stadium: AZAL Arena; Attendance: 300; Referee: Rauf Jabbarov

6 March 2016 24	Ravan Baku	1 – 3	Kapaz	Baku
16:00 AZT (UTC+4)	M.Quliyev 82'	Report	K.Diniyev 16'; Alasgarov 29'; B.Nasirov (yellow card) 36'; S.Rahimov (yellow card) 52'; Juninho 56'; S.Aliyev (yellow card) 75'	Stadium: Bayil Stadium; Attendance: 80; Referee: Elvin Əsgərov

13 March 2016 25	Inter Baku	3 – 1	Ravan Baku	Baku
15:00 AZT (UTC+4)	Khizanishvili 8'; M.Abbasov 18'; Kvekveskiri 22'; Amirjanov (yellow card) 35'; C.Meza (yellow card) 49'	Report	R.Tagizade 7'; K.Muslumov (yellow card) 21'; Khamid (yellow card) 41'; Yunisoğlu (yellow card) 58'	Stadium: Inter Arena; Attendance: 300; Referee: Orkhan Məmmədov

18 March 2016 26	Ravan Baku	1 – 2	Sumgayit	Baku
21:00 AZT (UTC+4)	R.Tagizade 90' (pen.)	Report	Yunisoğlu 8' (o.g.); A.Yunanov 33'; Ramaldanov (yellow card) 36'; Agayev (yellow card) 45+2'; J.Hajiyev (yellow card) 89'	Stadium: Bayil Stadium; Attendance: 150; Referee: Ravan Həmzəzadə

30 March 2016 27	Qarabağ	5 – 1	Ravan Baku	Baku
17:30 AZT (UTC+4)	Míchel 16'; Muarem 53'; Richard 55'; Reynaldo 64' (yellow card) 66'; Quintana 90+1'	Report	M.Hashimli (yellow card) 39'; Khamid 68'; Y.Ağakarimzada (yellow card) 74'	Stadium: Azersun Arena; Attendance: 1,800; Referee: Orkhan Məmmədov

3 April 2016 28	Ravan Baku	1 – 0	Neftchi Baku	Baku
17:00 AZT (UTC+4)	E.Hasanaliyev 3'; Abbasov (yellow card) 81'	Report	K.Gurbanov (yellow card) 24'; Ailton (yellow card) 41'; Qurbanov (yellow card) 78'	Stadium: Bayil Stadium; Attendance: 200; Referee: Omar Paşayev

10 April 2016 29	Ravan Baku	0 – 4	Zira	Baku
14:00 AZT (UTC+4)	A.Huseynov (yellow card) 11'	Report	Tato 16' (yellow card) 62'; Bonilla 52', 57', 90+2'	Stadium: Bayil Stadium; Attendance: 400; Referee: Ramil Diniyev

15 April 2016 30	Gabala	2 – 0	Ravan Baku	Qabala
16:00 AZT (UTC+4)	Ricardinho (yellow card) 68'; E.Jamalov (yellow card) 73'; A.Mammadov (yellow card) 76' (goal) 80'; Antonov 85'; Stanković (yellow card) 88'	Report	Yunisoğlu (yellow card) 54' (yellow-red card) 61'	Stadium: Gabala City Stadium; Attendance: 600; Referee: Rauf Jabbarov

24 April 2016 31	Ravan Baku	1 – 0	AZAL	Baku
16:00 AZT (UTC+4)	Khamid 14'; H.Akhundov (yellow card) 55'; N.Gurbanov (yellow card) 80'	Report		Stadium: Bayil Stadium; Attendance: 300; Referee: Orkhan Məmmədov

30 April 2016 32	Kapaz	3 – 2	Ravan Baku	Ganja
15:00 AZT (UTC+4)	Ebah 10'; Alasgarov (yellow card) 42'; K.Muslumov 47' (o.g.); T.Akhundov 61' (pen.)	Report	Abbasov 40' (pen.); R.Tagizade (yellow card) 42'; M.Quliyev (yellow card) 55'; K.Muslumov (yellow card) 60'; E.Abdulov 89'	Stadium: Ganja City Stadium; Attendance: 8,100; Referee: Ravan Həmzəzadə

7 May 2016 33	Ravan Baku	0 – 4	Inter Baku	Baku
17:00 AZT (UTC+4)	R.Tagizade (yellow card) 24'; N.Mammadov (yellow card) 76'; A.Huseynov (yellow card) 89'	Report	A.Hüseynov (yellow card) 20' (goal) 23'; M.Abbasov 42', 56'; Hajiyev (yellow card) 82' (goal) 90'	Stadium: Bayil Stadium; Attendance: 250; Referee: Fariz Yusifov

11 May 2016 34	Sumgayit	3 – 1	Ravan Baku	Sumqayit
18:00 AZT (UTC+4)	A.Yunanov 64'; Fardjad-Azad 71', 81'	Report	Khamid 8'; E.Abdulov (yellow card) 69'	Stadium: Kapital Bank Arena; Attendance: 800; Referee: Ravan Həmzəzadə

15 May 2016 35	Ravan Baku	2 – 1	Qarabağ	Baku
18:00 AZT (UTC+4)	Abbasov 27' (pen.); Yunisoğlu (yellow card) 45'; E.Abdulov 55'; H.Akhundov (yellow card) 86'; R.Azizli (yellow card) 89'; R.Tagizade (yellow card) 90+1'	Report	E.Yagublu (red card) 25'; Ismayilov 45+1' (pen.)	Stadium: Bayil Stadium; Attendance: 400; Referee: Elvin Asgərov

20 May 2016 36	Ravan Baku	2 – 2	Khazar Lankaran	Baku
17:00 AZT (UTC+4)	K.Muslumov (yellow card) 33'; Khamid 76'; Abbasov 84' (pen.); R.Azizli (yellow card) 87'	Report	B.Budagov 2'; Z.Mirzazade (yellow card) 36'; I.Gadirzade 66'; O.Sadigli (yellow card) 80'; Jalilov (yellow card) 80'; T.Gasimzada (yellow card) 83'; V.Gulaliyev (yellow card) 90+3'	Stadium: Bayil Stadium; Attendance: 800; Referee: Ramil Diniyev

==== League table ====
Pos	Team	Pld	W	D	L	GF	GA	GD	Pts	Qualification or relegation
6	Neftçi Baku	36	13	10	13	41	41	0	49	Qualification for the Europa League first qualifying round
7	AZAL	36	13	7	16	26	38	−12	46	
8	Sumgayit	36	9	12	15	41	49	−8	39	
9	Ravan Baku	36	5	9	22	27	63	−36	18	
10	Khazar Lankaran (R)	36	3	6	27	16	51	−35	15	Relegation to the Azerbaijan First Division

Source: PFL, UEFA, Soccerway
Rules for classification: 1) Points; 2) Head-to-head points; 3) Head-to-head goal difference; 4) Head-to-head goals scored; 5) Head-to-head away goals scored (only if two teams); 6) Goal difference; 7) Goals scored.
(R) Relegated

=== Azerbaijan Cup ===
3 December 2015 Second Round	Ravan Baku	1 – 0	Baku	Baku
20:00 AZT (UTC+4)	V.Baybalayev 23'; Suma (yellow card) 75'	Summary		Stadium: Bayil Stadium; Attendance: 100; Referee: Aliyar Ağayev

2 March 2016 Quarterfinal 1st leg	Ravan Baku	2 – 1	Inter Baku	Baku
19:00 AZT (UTC+4)	R.Tagizade (yellow card) 16'; M.Hashimli (yellow card) 43'; N.Gurbanov 61' (yellow card) 90'; Abbasov 81'	Summary	Denis (yellow card) 7'; C.Meza (yellow card) 22' (goal) 56'; A.Huseynov (yellow card) 70'; Nadirov (yellow card) 80'	Stadium: Bayil Stadium; Attendance: 200; Referee: Ramil Diniyev

9 March 2016 Quarterfinal 2nd leg	Inter Baku	3 – 0 (4 – 2 agg.)	Ravan Baku	Baku
14:00 AZT (UTC+4)	Kvekveskiri 31'; C.Meza (yellow card) 63' (goal) 65'; Nadirov 85'	Summary	Y.Ağakarimzada (yellow card) 10'; R.Azizli (yellow card) 30'; Khamid (yellow card) 71'; K.Muslumov (yellow card) 76'	Stadium: Inter Arena; Attendance: 400; Referee: Ramil Diniyev

== Squad statistics ==
As of Match played 20 May 2016

=== Appearances and goals ===
No.	Pos	Nat	Player	Total		Premier League		Azerbaijan Cup	
No.	Pos	Nat	Player	Apps	Goals	Apps	Goals	Apps	Goals
1	GK	(Azerbaijan) AZE	Rashad Azizli	18	0	16	0	2	0
2	MF	(Azerbaijan) AZE	Ruslan Tagizade	33	4	28+2	4	3	0
3	DF	(Azerbaijan) AZE	Saşa Yunisoğlu	21	0	17+1	0	3	0
4	DF	(Azerbaijan) AZE	Kanan Muslumov	24	0	20+2	0	1+1	0
5	DF	(Azerbaijan) AZE	Mirkmail Hashimli	12	0	6+5	0	1	0
6	DF	(Azerbaijan) AZE	Vugar Baybalayev	19	1	16+2	0	1	1
7	MF	(Azerbaijan) AZE	Elvin Hasanaliyev	17	1	10+6	1	0+1	0
8	MF	(Azerbaijan) AZE	Mämmäd Quliyev	26	1	22+3	1	1	0
9	MF	(Azerbaijan) AZE	Nuran Gurbanov	11	1	5+4	0	1+1	1
11	MF	(Azerbaijan) AZE	Elnur Abdulov	11	2	5+5	2	0+1	0
12	GK	(Azerbaijan) AZE	Elçin Sadıqov	2	0	2	0	0	0
13	MF	(Azerbaijan) AZE	Jamshid Maharramov	22	0	11+10	0	1	0
14	DF	(Azerbaijan) AZE	Elvin Aliyev	14	0	9+3	0	2	0
15	FW	(Azerbaijan) AZE	Jeyhun Abdullayev	18	1	10+7	1	1	0
16	DF	(Azerbaijan) AZE	Orkhan Lalayev	27	0	21+4	0	2	0
17	MF	(Azerbaijan) AZE	Ramazan Abbasov	35	6	31+1	5	3	1
19	DF	(Azerbaijan) AZE	Huseyn Akhundov	12	0	7+5	0	0	0
21	DF	(Azerbaijan) AZE	Novruz Mammadov	35	0	32+1	0	2	0
25	FW	(Azerbaijan) AZE	Oruj Balashli	2	0	0+2	0	0	0
29	MF	(Azerbaijan) AZE	Aziz Quliyev	4	0	3+1	0	0	0
39	MF	(Azerbaijan) AZE	Əlibəy Məmmədli	5	0	0+3	0	1+1	0
86	FW	(Ukraine) UKR	Yasyn Khamid	17	4	10+5	4	2	0
92	DF	(Azerbaijan) AZE	Yamin Ağakärimzadä	30	2	25+3	2	2	0
99	MF	(Azerbaijan) AZE	Aziz Huseynov	16	0	9+5	0	0+2	0
Players who appeared for Ravan Baku but left during the season:
10	MF	(Uzbekistan) UZB	Alibobo Rakhmatullaev	4	0	1+3	0	0	0
11	DF	(Sierra Leone) SLE	Sheriff Suma	18	1	17	1	1	0
18	MF	(Sierra Leone) SLE	Samuel Barlay	6	0	6	0	0	0
19	FW	(Azerbaijan) AZE	Tural Gurbatov	16	4	13+2	4	1	0
20	MF	(Azerbaijan) AZE	Kanan Manafov	2	0	1	0	1	0
22	FW	(Azerbaijan) AZE	Mahammad Aliyev	10	0	7+3	0	0	
32	GK	(Ukraine) UKR	Kostyantyn Makhnovskyi	19	0	18	0	1	0
77	MF	(Azerbaijan) AZE	Javad Kazimov	7	0	0+6	0	0+1	0
86	FW	(Azerbaijan) AZE	Farid Guliyev	7	0	4+3	0	0	0
99	MF	(Azerbaijan) AZE	Nijat Mukhtarov	17	2	14+3	2	0	0

=== Goal scorers ===
Place	Position	Nation	Number	Name	Premier League	Azerbaijan Cup	Total
1	MF	(Azerbaijan)	17	Ramazan Abbasov	5	1	6
2	FW	(Azerbaijan)	19	Tural Gurbatov	4	0	4
2	MF	(Azerbaijan)	2	Ruslan Tagizade	4	0	4
2	FW	(Ukraine)	86	Yasyn Khamid	4	0	4
5	MF	(Azerbaijan)	99	Nijat Mukhtarov	2	0	2
5	DF	(Azerbaijan)	92	Yamin Ağakärimzadä	2	0	2
5	MF	(Azerbaijan)	11	Elnur Abdulov	2	0	2
8	DF	(Azerbaijan)	6	Vugar Baybalayev	1	0	1
8	DF	(Sierra Leone)	11	Sheriff Suma	1	0	1
8	FW	(Azerbaijan)	15	Ceyhun Abdullayev	1	0	1
8	MF	(Azerbaijan)	9	Nuran Gurbanov	1	0	1
8	MF	(Azerbaijan)	8	Mämmäd Quliyev	1	0	1
8	MF	(Azerbaijan)	7	Elvin Hasanaliyev	1	0	1
				TOTALS	27	3	30

=== Disciplinary record ===
Number	Nation	Position	Name	Premier League		Azerbaijan Cup		Total	
Number	Nation	Position	Name	Yellow card	Red card	Yellow card	Red card	Yellow card	Red card
1	(Azerbaijan)	GK	Rashad Azizli	3	0	1	0	4	0
2	(Azerbaijan)	MF	Ruslan Tagizade	7	0	1	0	8	0
3	(Azerbaijan)	DF	Saşa Yunisoğlu	8	1	0	0	8	1
4	(Azerbaijan)	DF	Kanan Muslumov	8	1	1	0	9	1
5	(Azerbaijan)	DF	Mirkmail Hashimli	1	0	1	0	2	0
6	(Azerbaijan)	DF	Vugar Baybalayev	2	0	0	0	2	0
7	(Azerbaijan)	MF	Elvin Hasanaliyev	2	0	0	0	2	0
8	(Azerbaijan)	MF	Mämmäd Quliyev	2	0	0	0	2	0
9	(Azerbaijan)	MF	Nuran Gurbanov	2	0	1	0	3	0
11	(Azerbaijan)	FW	Elnur Abdulov	1	0	0	0	1	0
11	(Azerbaijan)	FW	Ceyhun Abdullayev	1	0	0	0	1	0
14	(Azerbaijan)	DF	Elvin Aliyev	3	0	0	0	3	0
15	(Azerbaijan)	FW	Ceyhun Abdullayev	1	0	0	0	1	0
16	(Azerbaijan)	DF	Orkhan Lalayev	4	1	0	0	4	1
17	(Azerbaijan)	MF	Ramazan Abbasov	5	0	0	0	5	0
18	(Sierra Leone)	MF	Samuel Barlay	4	0	0	0	4	0
19	(Azerbaijan)	FW	Tural Gurbatov	4	0	0	0	4	0
19	(Azerbaijan)	DF	Huseyn Akhundov	1	0	0	0	1	0
20	(Azerbaijan)	MF	Kanan Manafov	2	1	0	0	2	1
21	(Azerbaijan)	DF	Novruz Mammadov	9	1	0	0	9	1
32	(Ukraine)	GK	Kostyantyn Makhnovskyi	4	0	0	0	4	0
77	(Azerbaijan)	MF	Javad Kazimov	1	0	0	0	1	0
86	(Ukraine)	FW	Yasyn Khamid	2	1	1	0	3	1
92	(Azerbaijan)	DF	Yamin Ağakärimzadä	9	0	1	0	10	0
99	(Azerbaijan)	MF	Nijat Mukhtarov	1	0	0	0	1	0
99	(Azerbaijan)	MF	Aziz Huseynov	2	0	0	0	2	0
			TOTALS	92	6	8	0	100	6

== Notes ==
- Qarabağ have played their home games at the Tofiq Bahramov Stadium since 1993 due to the ongoing situation in Quzanlı.
