= Musa Kabiru =

Nigerian footballer

Personal information
- Full name: Musah Kabiru
- Date of birth: 16 June 1992 (age 34)
- Place of birth: Ugbawka, Nigeria
- Height: 1.75 m (5 ft 9 in)
- Position: Forward

Senior career*
Years	Team	Apps	(Gls)
2006–2009	Kaduna United F.C.	60	(34)
2009–2013	Arab Contractors	61	(30)
2013	Ravan Baku		
2013–2014	El Qanah	18	(12)
2014–2015	Sheikh Jamal		
2015–2016	Shabab Al-Sahel	21	(16)
2016	Al-Ahed	8	(3)
2017	Al-Quwa Al-Jawiya	0	(0)
2017–2018	Nejmeh	19	(6)
2018–2019	Al-Salt		
2019–2020	Tadamon Sour	0	(0)

International career
	Nigeria U-20	9	(7)
2008	Nigeria	2	(2)
- * Club domestic league appearances and goals as of 19:33, 19 January 2021 (UTC)

Musa Kabiru (born 16 June 1986) is a Nigerian professional footballer who plays as a midfielder.

== Club career ==
He began his career with Kaduna United. Musa Kabiru joined the Egyptian club, Al-Mokawloon Al-Arab, before the start of the 2009-10 Egyptian Premier League season.

In August 2013 Musa signed for Azerbaijan Premier League side Ravan Baku. However the transfer fell through as due to problems with the players documentation, and Musa went on to sign for fellow Egyptian team Olympic El Qanah. Musa scored in his second game for El Qanah, a 1-1 draw against El-Gaish in the 2013–14 Egyptian Premier League.

== International career ==
He played for the Home-based Nigeria national football team his first game was on 3 December 2008 against Ghana national football team in an African Nations Championship qualifier. He scored Nigeria's two goals.

== Career statistics ==
=== Club ===
As of 7 January 2014

Club performance			League		Cup		Continental		Total	
Season	Club	League	Apps	Goals	Apps	Goals	Apps	Goals	Apps	Goals
2009–10	Al-Mokawloon Al-Arab	Egyptian Premier League	8	0		0	—		8	0
2010–11	Al-Mokawloon Al-Arab	Egyptian Premier League	26	5	3	2	—		29	7
2011–12	Al-Mokawloon Al-Arab	Egyptian Premier League	12	2	cancelled		—		0	0
2012–13	Al-Mokawloon Al-Arab	Egyptian Premier League	15	5			—		0	0
2013–14	Ravan Baku	Azerbaijan Premier League	0	0	0	0	—		0	0
2013–14	Olympic El Qanah	Egyptian Premier League	3	2			—		2	1
Total	Egypt		64	14	3	2	-		67	16
Total	Azerbaijan		0	0	0	0	-		0	0
Career total			64	14	3	2	-		67	16

== Honours ==
Individual

- Lebanese Premier League Best Foreign Player: 2015–16
