= Łukasz Sapela =

Polish footballer

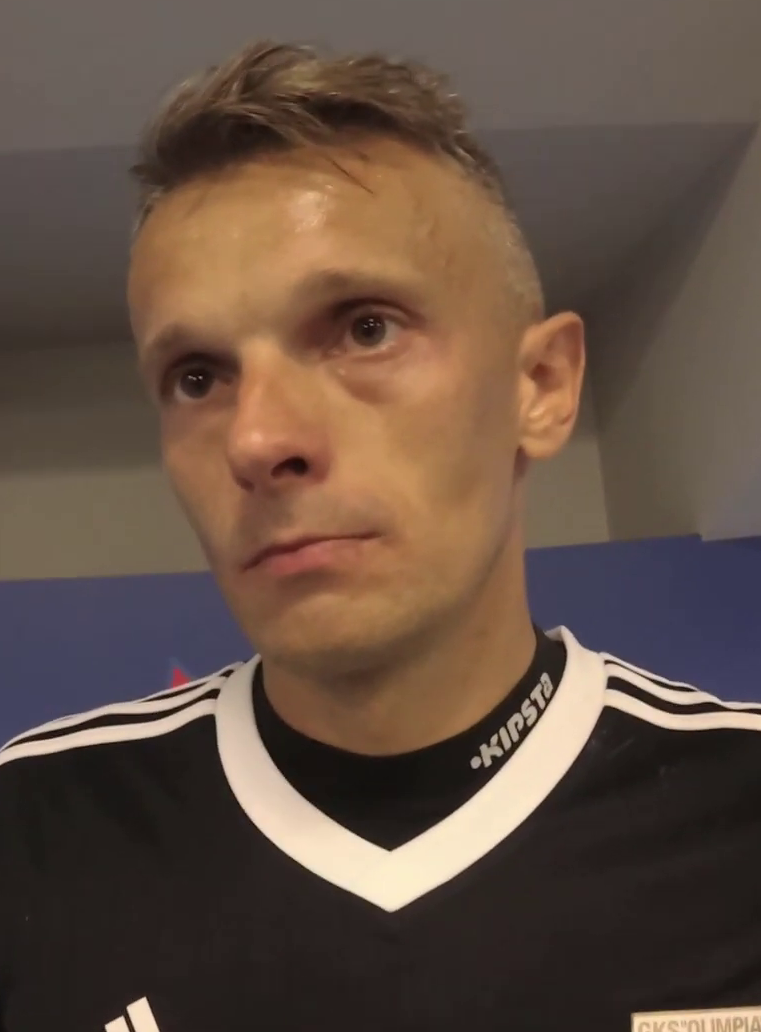
- Sapela in 2019

Personal information
- Full name: Łukasz Sapela
- Date of birth: 21 September 1982 (age 44)
- Place of birth: Piotrków Trybunalski, Poland
- Height: 1.86 m (6 ft 1 in)
- Position: Goalkeeper

Youth career
- GKS Bełchatów

Senior career*
Years	Team	Apps	(Gls)
2000–2012	GKS Bełchatów	138	(0)
2012–2014	Ravan Baku	44	(0)
2014–2015	Olimpia Grudziądz	12	(0)
2015	Flota Świnoujście	9	(0)
2015–2016	Zawisza Bydgoszcz	21	(0)
2016–2019	Miedź Legnica	34	(0)
2016–2017	Miedź Legnica II	2	(0)
2019–2021	Olimpia Grudziądz	30	(0)
Total		290	(0)
- * Club domestic league appearances and goals

Łukasz Sapela (born 21 September 1982) is a Polish former professional footballer who played as a goalkeeper. He was most recently the goalkeeping coach and sporting manager of GKS Bełchatów.

== Career ==
In May 2012, Sapela was listed on a list of players facing match fixing chargers whilst playing for GKS Bełchatów in the 2003–04 season.

In June 2012, Sapela left GKS Bełchatów after 12 years with the club. In July 2012, Sapela signed a one-year contract with Ravan Baku.

In July 2014, Sapela signed a one-year contract with I liga side Olimpia Grudziądz, with the option of a second if they are promoted to the Ekstraklasa.

In July 2015, Sapela joined I liga side Zawisza Bydgoszcz on a one-year deal.

== Career statistics ==
Appearances and goals by club, season and competition
Club	Season	League			National cup (Note: Includes Polish Cup, Azerbaijan Cup)		Europe		Other		Total	
Club	Season	Division	Apps	Goals	Apps	Goals	Apps	Goals	Apps	Goals	Apps	Goals
GKS Bełchatów	2003–04	II liga	1	0	0	0	—		—		1	0
GKS Bełchatów	2004–05	II liga	0	0	7	0	—		—		7	0
GKS Bełchatów	2005–06	Ekstraklasa	9	0	0	0	—		—		9	0
GKS Bełchatów	2006–07	Ekstraklasa	8	0	1	0	—		8 (Note: Appearances in Ekstraklasa Cup)	0	17	0
GKS Bełchatów	2007–08	Ekstraklasa	21	0	0	0	0	0	2 (Note: One appearance in Ekstraklasa Cup, one appearance in Polish Super Cup)	0	23	0
GKS Bełchatów	2008–09	Ekstraklasa	11	0	1	0	—		6	0	18	0
GKS Bełchatów	2009–10	Ekstraklasa	30	0	1	0	—		—		31	0
GKS Bełchatów	2010–11	Ekstraklasa	29	0	1	0	—		—		30	0
GKS Bełchatów	2011–12	Ekstraklasa	29	0	0	0	—		—		29	0
GKS Bełchatów	Total		138	0	11	0	0	0	16	0	165	0
Ravan Baku	2012–13	Azerbaijan Premier League	18	0	2	0	—		—		20	0
Ravan Baku	2013–14	Azerbaijan Premier League	26	0	3	0	—		—		29	0
Ravan Baku	Total		44	0	5	0	—		—		49	0
Olimpia Grudziądz	2014–15	I liga	12	0	0	0	—		—		12	0
Flota Świnoujście	2014–15	I liga	9	0	—		—		—		9	0
Zawisza Bydgoszcz	2015–16	I liga	21	0	0	0	—		—		21	0
Miedź Legnica	2016–17	I liga	3	0	1	0	—		—		4	0
Miedź Legnica	2017–18	I liga	21	0	1	0	—		—		22	0
Miedź Legnica	2018–19	Ekstraklasa	10	0	2	0	—		—		12	0
Miedź Legnica	Total		34	0	4	0	—		—		38	0
Miedź Legnica II	2016–17	III liga, gr. III	1	0	0	0	—		—		1	0
Miedź Legnica II	2017–18	III liga, gr. III	1	0	—		—		—		1	0
Miedź Legnica II	Total		2	0	0	0	—		—		2	0
Olimpia Grudziądz	2019–20	I liga	26	0	0	0	—		—		26	0
Olimpia Grudziądz	2020–21	II liga	4	0	2	0	—		—		6	0
Olimpia Grudziądz	Total		30	0	2	0	—		—		32	0
Career total			290	0	22	0	0	0	16	0	328	0

== Honours ==
Miedź Legnica

- I liga: 2017–18
