= Fredrik Holster =

Swedish footballer

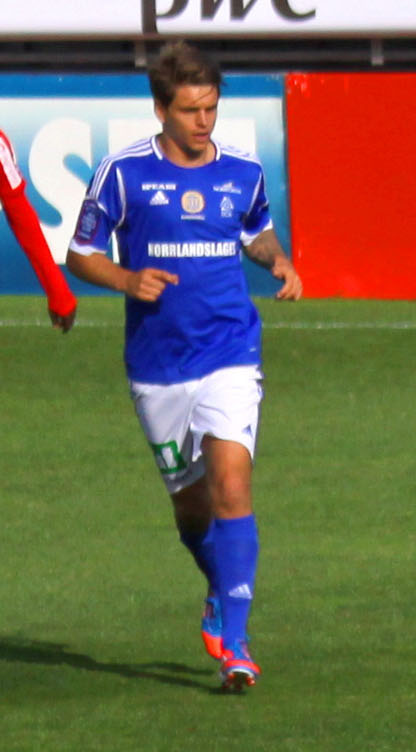

Personal information
- Full name: Fredrik Holster
- Date of birth: 10 March 1988 (age 38)
- Place of birth: Nyköping, Sweden
- Height: 1.80 m (5 ft 11 in)
- Position: Midfielder

Team information
- Current team: Nyköpings BIS
- Number: 12

Youth career
- Nyköpings BIS

Senior career*
Years	Team	Apps	(Gls)
2004–2005	Nyköpings BIS	17	(3)
2006–2008	BK Häcken	16	(0)
2008–2010	Väsby United	55	(5)
2010–2013	GIF Sundsvall	66	(21)
2013–2014	Ravan Baku	5	(0)
2014–2016	Assyriska	84	(11)
2017	Åtvidabergs FF	26	(1)
2018–	Nyköpings BIS	0	(0)

International career^{‡}
2005	Sweden U17	5	(0)
2005–2007	Sweden U19	12	(1)
- * Club domestic league appearances and goals as of 28 February 2018 ‡ National team caps and goals as of 3 October 2012

Fredrik Holster (born 10 March 1988 in Nyköping) is a Swedish footballer who last played for Nyköpings BIS.

== Career ==
He has previously played for BK Häcken and FC Väsby United and GIF Sundsvall.

In August 2013 Holster signed for Azerbaijan Premier League side Ravan Baku. On 19 October 2013, Holster made his debut for Ravan Baku, coming on as a half time substitute for Miloš Adamović in their 2-1 defeat to Neftchi Baku. Holster left Ravan at the start of the winter break in December 2013, and went on to sign a two-year contract with Assyriska in March 2014.

== Career statistics ==
As of 14 July 2014

Club performance			League		Cup		Continental		Play-Offs		Total	
Season	Club	League	Apps	Goals	Apps	Goals	Apps	Goals	Apps	Goals	Apps	Goals
2006	BK Häcken	Allsvenskan	2	0			—		0	0	2	0
2007	BK Häcken	Superettan	8	0			3	0	—		11	0
2008	BK Häcken	Superettan	6	0			—		—		6	0
2008	Väsby United	Superettan	12	0			—		—		12	0
2009	Väsby United	Superettan	28	2	1	0	—		—		29	2
2010	Väsby United	Superettan	15	2	2	1	—		—		17	3
2010	GIF Sundsvall	Superettan	8	2	0	0	—		2	0	10	2
2011	GIF Sundsvall	Superettan	26	14	2	1	—		—		28	15
2012	GIF Sundsvall	Allsvenskan	29	5	1	2	—		2	1	32	8
2013	GIF Sundsvall	Superettan	1	0	3	0	—		—		4	0
2013–14	Ravan Baku	Azerbaijan Premier League	5	0	1	0	—		—		6	0
2014	Assyriska	Superettan	14	3	0	0	—		—		14	3
Total	Sweden		151	29	9	4	3	0	4	1	167	34
Total	Azerbaijan		5	0	1	0	-		-		6	0
Career total			156	29	10	4	3	0	4	1	173	34
