= Ivan Pecha =

Slovak footballer (born 1986)

Personal information
- Full name: Ivan Pecha
- Date of birth: 23 January 1986 (age 40)
- Place of birth: Bratislava, Czechoslovakia
- Height: 1.87 m (6 ft 2 in)
- Position: Defender

Senior career*
Years	Team	Apps	(Gls)
2005–2006	Slovan Bratislava	2	(0)
2006–2007	Senec	37	(1)
2008–2009	Ceahlăul Piatra Neamț	10	(0)
2008	→ BATE Borisov (loan)	4	(0)
2009–2010	Khazar Lankaran	31	(0)
2011–2012	Neman Grodno	26	(0)
2013	Ravan Baku	17	(0)
2014	Liepāja	14	(0)
2014	Oțelul Galați	2	(0)
2015	Levadia Tallinn	13	(0)
2016	Motor Lublin	2	(0)
2016	Torrevieja	5	(0)
2017	Ciudad Murcia	16	(1)
2018	Atlantas	9	(0)
2019	Motorlet Prague	3	(0)
2020	ASK Kematen		
- * Club domestic league appearances and goals

Ivan Pecha (born 23 January 1986) is a Slovak former footballer who played as a defender.

== Career ==
Previously he played for Neman Grodno and BATE Borisov in Belarus, Khazar Lankaran in Azerbaijan, Ceahlăul Piatra Neamț in Romania and Senec and Slovan Bratislava in Slovakia.

In February 2008, Pecha joined Ceahlăul Piatra Neamţ before moving to BATE Borisov on loan in August 2008.

In July 2013, Pecha returned to Azerbaijan, signing a one-year contract with Ravan Baku. During the winter break, Ravan decided to release Pecha, and he moved to FK Liepāja with fellow Ravan Baku player Cristián Torres.

At the end of July 2014, Pecha moved from FK Liepāja to Liga I side Oțelul Galați.

In January 2015, Pecha moved to Estonia, signing with Levadia Tallinn. In July, Levadia cancelled the contract with Pecha.

On 11 August 2016, he signed a contract with Polish club Motor Lublin.

On 23 November 2016, Ivan signed a contract with Spanish team Torrevieja.

== Career statistics ==
As of Match played 10 July 2015

Club performance			League		Cup		Continental		Other		Total	
Season	Club	League	Apps	Goals	Apps	Goals	Apps	Goals	Apps	Goals	Apps	Goals
2009–10	Khazar Lankaran	Azerbaijan Premier League	31	0	6	0	—		-		37	0
2011	Neman Grodno	Belarusian Premier League	7	0	0	0	—		-		7	0
2012	Neman Grodno	Belarusian Premier League	19	0	3	0	—		-		22	0
2013–14	Ravan Baku	Azerbaijan Premier League	17	0	1	1	—		-		18	1
2014	FK Liepāja	Latvian Higher League	14	0	1	0	-		-		15	0
2014–15	Oțelul Galați	Liga I	2	0	0	0	-		-		2	0
2015	Levadia Tallinn	Meistriliiga	13	0	1	0	-		2	0	16	0
Total	Azerbaijan		48	0	7	1	-		-		55	1
Total	Belarus		27	0	3		-		-		30	0
Total	Latvia		14	0	1	0	-		-		15	0
Total	Romania		2	0	0	0	-		-		2	0
Total	Estonia		13	0	1	0	-		2	0	16	0
Career total			104	0	12	1	-		2	0	118	1

== Honours ==
Levadia Tallinn

- Estonian Supercup: 2015
