= Oke Akpoveta =

Nigerian footballer (born 1991)

Personal information
- Date of birth: 13 December 1991 (age 34)
- Place of birth: Warri, Nigeria
- Height: 1.78 m (5 ft 10 in)
- Position: Forward

Team information
- Current team: Åstorps FF

Senior career*
Years	Team	Apps	(Gls)
2009–2011	Warri Wolves		
2011–2014	Brøndby	20	(0)
2014	Ravan Baku	11	(1)
2014–2015	Brønshøj	26	(5)
2015–2016	Lyngby	13	(3)
2016	→ IK Frej (loan)	13	(10)
2016	Dalkurd FF	12	(0)
2017	Helsingborg	23	(8)
2018	AFC Eskilstuna	22	(3)
2019	Sabail	9	(2)
2019	IK Frej	11	(3)
2020–2021	Norrby IF	21	(6)
2021	Al-Thoqbah	2	(0)
2021	KPV	13	(9)
2022	Höganäs BK	12	(7)
2022	Valletta	12	(4)
2023	Nosaby IF	12	(3)
2023–2024	KPV	7	(4)
2024–	Åstorps FF	19	(19)
- * Club domestic league appearances and goals as of 20:49, 20 November 2024 (UTC)

Oke Akpoveta (born 13 December 1991) is a Nigerian footballer who as a forward for Division 3 club Åstorps FF.

== Career ==
Akpoveta signed a four-year-long contract with Brøndby in the Danish Superliga on the 9 of August 2011. He made his official debut at the 28 of August against FC Midtjylland. He got injured at the 6 of September in a reserve-match against FC Copenhagen and was out the rest of the season. On 6 January 2014, Akpoveta had his contract with Brøndby cancelled by mutual consent.

In January 2014 Akpoveta moved to Ravan Baku in the Azerbaijan Premier League, signing an 18-month contract. In April 2014, Akpoveta was given permission to return to Denmark for a couple of days, but then failed to return to the club, and left the club permanently at the end of the season.

On 16 July 2014 Akpoveta returned to Denmark signing an 18-month contract with Danish First Division side Brønshøj. On 30 June 2015, Akpoveta signed a 12-month contract with Danish First Division side Lyngby.

In the January transfer window Akpoveta was loaned out to Swedish Superettan club IK Frej for the remainder of the 2015–16 season. He impressed, scoring 12 goals in 13 games. As a result, on 13 July 2016, fellow Superettan club Dalkurd revealed that the club had signed Akpoveta on a free transfer after a few weeks speculation. After a trial with the Superettan rival club Helsingborgs IF where he made an assist in a friendly against Odense, Akpoveta signed for Helsingborgs IF on 17 February 2017 for an unknown fee.

On 16 February 2019, Akpoveta signed a six-month contract with Azerbaijan Premier League club Sabail FK.

On 31 July 2019, Akpoveta returned to IK Frej, where he signed a one-and-a-half-year contract. Six months later, in January 2020, Akpoveta signed a two-year contract with Norrby IF. Akpoveta then had short stints with Saudi club Al-Thoqbah, Finnish club KPV, and Swedish club Höganäs before joining Maltese club Valletta on 25 July 2022. His contract with Valletta was terminated by mutual consent on 29 December 2022, making him a free agent.

On 28 July 2023, Akpoveta signed a contract with Finnish side KPV for the rest of the season. He scored in his debut match. In February 2024, he joined Swedish Division 3 club Åstorps FF.

== Career statistics ==
As of 30 September 2017

Club performance			League		Cup		Continental		Total	
Season	Club	League	Apps	Goals	Apps	Goals	Apps	Goals	Apps	Goals
Denmark		Division	League		Cup		Continental		Total	
2011–12	Brøndby	Danish Superliga	1	0	0	0	—		1	0
2012–13	Brøndby	Danish Superliga	19	0	4	0	—		23	0
Azerbaijan		Division	League		Cup		Continental		Total	
2013–14	Ravan Baku	Azerbaijan Premier League	11	1	4	0	—		15	1
Denmark		Division	League		Cup		Continental		Total	
2014–15	Brønshøj BK	Danish 1st Division	20	4	2	1	—		22	5
2015–16	Lyngby Boldklub	Danish 1st Division	13	3	1	0	—		14	3
Sweden		Division	League		Cup		Continental		Total	
2016	IK Frej (loan)	Superettan	13	10	3	1	—		16	11
2016	Dalkurd FF	Superettan	12	0	1	1	—		12	1
2017	Helsingborgs IF	Superettan	23	8	2	1	—		25	9
Total	Denmark		53	7	7	1	—		60	8
Total	Azerbaijan		11	1	4	0	—		15	1
Total	Sweden		46	18	6	3	—		53	21
Career total			110	26	17	4	0	0	128	30
