= Mitja Mörec =

Slovenian footballer

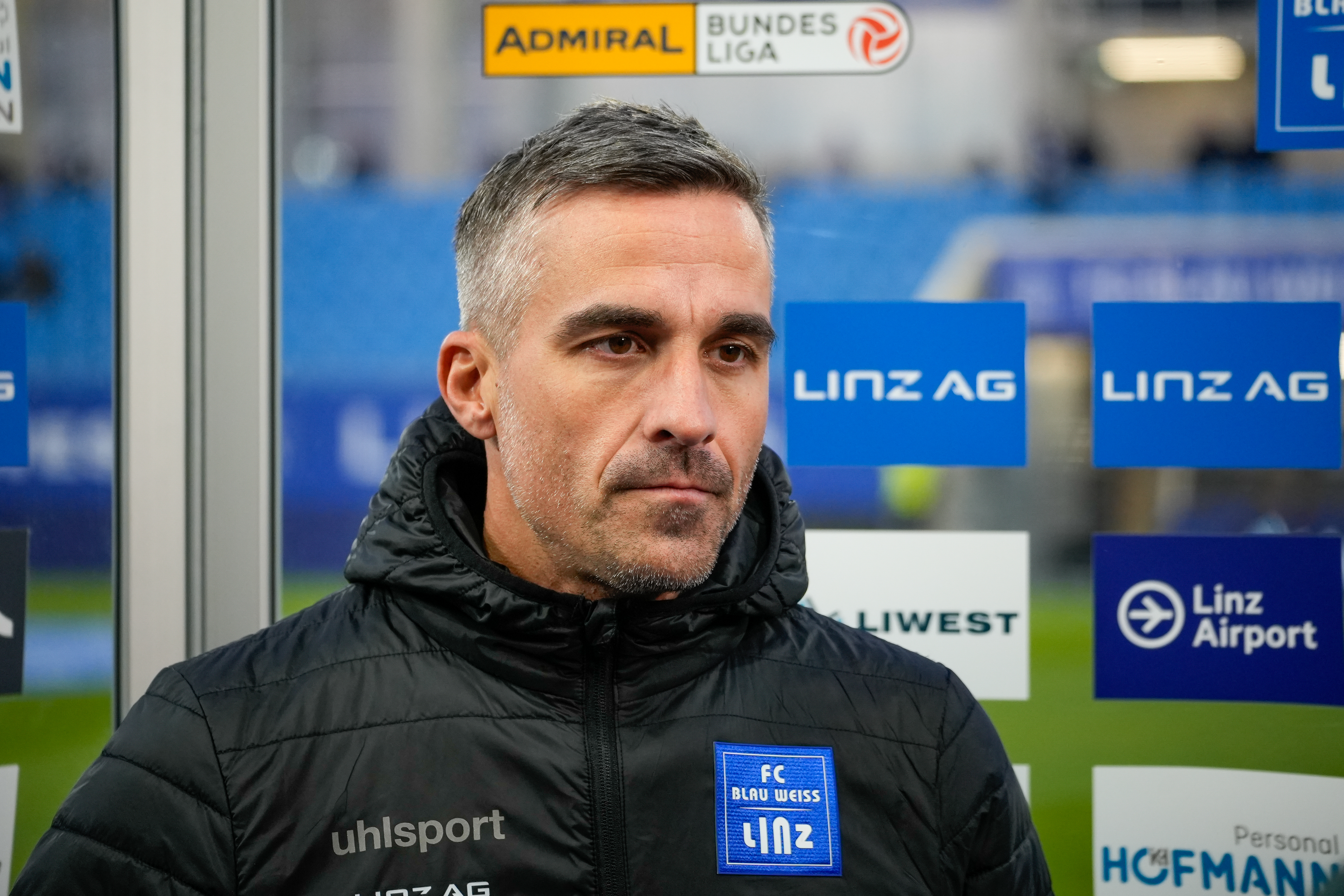
- Mörec in 2025

Personal information
- Full name: Mitja Mörec
- Date of birth: 21 February 1983 (age 43)
- Place of birth: Murska Sobota, Slovenia
- Height: 1.88 m (6 ft 2 in)
- Position: Centre back

Team information
- Current team: Mura (manager)

Youth career
- Mura

Senior career*
Years	Team	Apps	(Gls)
2000–2002	Mura	6	(0)
2002–2007	Sturm Graz	55	(0)
2007–2008	Maccabi Herzliya	29	(0)
2008	CSKA Sofia	2	(0)
2009	Slavia Sofia	10	(0)
2009–2011	Panetolikos	28	(0)
2011	Lyngby	5	(0)
2011–2012	ADO Den Haag	5	(0)
2012–2013	Mura 05	16	(0)
2013	Kaisar	15	(3)
2014	Ravan Baku	15	(0)
2014–2015	Hoàng Anh Gia Lai	1	(0)
2015–2017	UFC Bad Radkersburg	46	(5)
2019–2020	FavAC	22	(0)
Total		255	(8)

International career
2000–2001	Slovenia U17	4	(0)
2001	Slovenia U18	10	(0)
2002–2005	Slovenia U19	1	(0)
2002–2003	Slovenia U20	4	(0)
2002–2005	Slovenia U21	19	(0)
2007–2009	Slovenia	14	(0)

Managerial career
- 2018–2020: FavAC (U15)
- 2021–2025: Floridsdorfer AC
- 2025: Blau-Weiß Linz
- 2026–: Mura
- * Club domestic league appearances and goals

Mitja Mörec (born 21 February 1983) is a Slovenian professional football manager and former player who played as a centre-back. He is currently the manager of Slovenian PrvaLiga club Mura.

== Playing career ==
=== Club ===
In March 2011, Mörec signed a contract with Lyngby BK for the remainder of the 2010–11 season. Following the expiration of his Lyngby contract, Mörec signed for ADO Den Haag in August 2011 on a one-year contract. However, his contract was terminated in January 2012.

In July 2013, Mörec signed for Kazakhstan First Division side Kaisar on a 30-month contract. But after only six-months Mörec moved to Ravan Baku of the Azerbaijan Premier League in January 2014 on an 18-month contract.

=== International ===
Mörec made his debut for Slovenia in a June 2007 European Championship qualification match away against Romania and earned a total of 14 caps, scoring no goals. His final international was a February 2009 friendly match away against Belgium.

== Coaching and later career ==
From the summer of 2017 to the summer of 2018, Mörec was coaching at an AC Milan soccer school in Dubai. On 1 November 2018, Mörec was appointed U-15 manager at Favoritner AC. He also began playing for the club’s first team in the Wiener Stadtliga from 1 January 2019.

On 7 May 2020, Mörec left Favoritner AC to join SV Wienerberg as an assistant coach under manager Andreas Reisinger. In January 2021, Mörec moved on to Floridsdorfer AC, where he was appointed assistant coach to Roman Ellensohn. When Ellensohn was fired on 16 April 2021, Mörec and Aleksandar Gitsov were appointed as an interim manager duo. In June 2021, the club announced that Mörec would continue as the manager and Gitsov as assistant coach for the 2021–22 season.

In July 2025, Mörec became the head coach of top-division side Blau-Weiß Linz.

== Career statistics ==
As of 19 May 2014

Appearances and goals by club, season and competition
Club	Season	League			National cup (Note: Includes KNVB Cup, Azerbaijan Cup)		Europe		Total	
Club	Season	Division	Apps	Goals	Apps	Goals	Apps	Goals	Apps	Goals
Mura	2000–01	Slovenian PrvaLiga	4	0			—		4	0
Mura	2001–02	Slovenian PrvaLiga	7	0			—		7	0
Mura	Total		11	0			—		11	0
Sturm Graz	2002–03	Austrian Football Bundesliga	0	0			—		0	0
Sturm Graz	2003–04	Austrian Football Bundesliga	3	0			—		3	0
Sturm Graz	2004–05	Austrian Football Bundesliga	12	0			—		12	0
Sturm Graz	2005–06	Austrian Football Bundesliga	16	0			—		16	0
Sturm Graz	2006–07	Austrian Football Bundesliga	24	0			—		24	0
Sturm Graz	Total		55	0			—		55	0
Maccabi Herzliya	2007–08	Israeli Premier League	29	0			—		29	0
CSKA Sofia	2008–09	A PFG	2	0			—		2	0
Slavia Sofia	2008–09	A PFG	9	0			—		9	0
Panetolikos	2009–10	Beta Ethniki	28	0			—		28	0
Panetolikos	2010–11	Football League	0	0			—		0	0
Panetolikos	Total		28	0			—		28	0
Lyngby BK	2010–11	Danish Superliga	5	0			—		5	0
ADO Den Haag	2011–12	Eredivisie	4	0	1	0	—		5	0
Mura 05	2012–13	Slovenian PrvaLiga	16	0	0	0	—		16	0
Kaisar	2013	Kazakhstan First Division	15	3			—		15	3
Ravan Baku	2013–14	Azerbaijan Premier League	15	0	4	0	—		19	0
Career total			189	3	5	0	0	0	194	3
