= Bojan Marković =

Bosnian footballer

Personal information
- Full name: Bojan Marković
- Date of birth: 12 November 1985 (age 40)
- Place of birth: Zenica, SFR Yugoslavia
- Height: 1.97 m (6 ft 5 1/2 in)
- Position: Centre-back

Senior career*
Years	Team	Apps	(Gls)
2003–2007	Rudar Ugljevik		
2007–2010	Čelik Zenica	40	(0)
2010	→ Spartak Nalchik (loan)	0	(0)
2011	Panserraikos	1	(0)
2011–2012	Borac Banja Luka	20	(0)
2012–2014	Hapoel Be'er Sheva	29	(1)
2014	Ravan Baku	12	(0)
2014–2015	Mladost Velika Obarska	4	(0)
2015	Politehnica Iași	3	(0)
2015	Slavija Sarajevo	24	(0)
2016	Čelik Zenica	15	(1)
2017	Teuta Durrës	16	(1)
2017–2018	Ruch Chorzów	21	(2)
2018–2019	Mladost Doboj Kakanj	22	(0)
2019–2020	Zvijezda 09	13	(1)
- * Club domestic league appearances and goals

Bojan Marković (Serbian Cyrillic: Бојан Марковић; born 12 November 1985) is a Bosnian former professional footballer who played as a centre-back.

== Honours ==
Borac Banja Luka

- Republika Srpska Cup: 2011–12
