= Miloš Adamović =

Serbian footballer

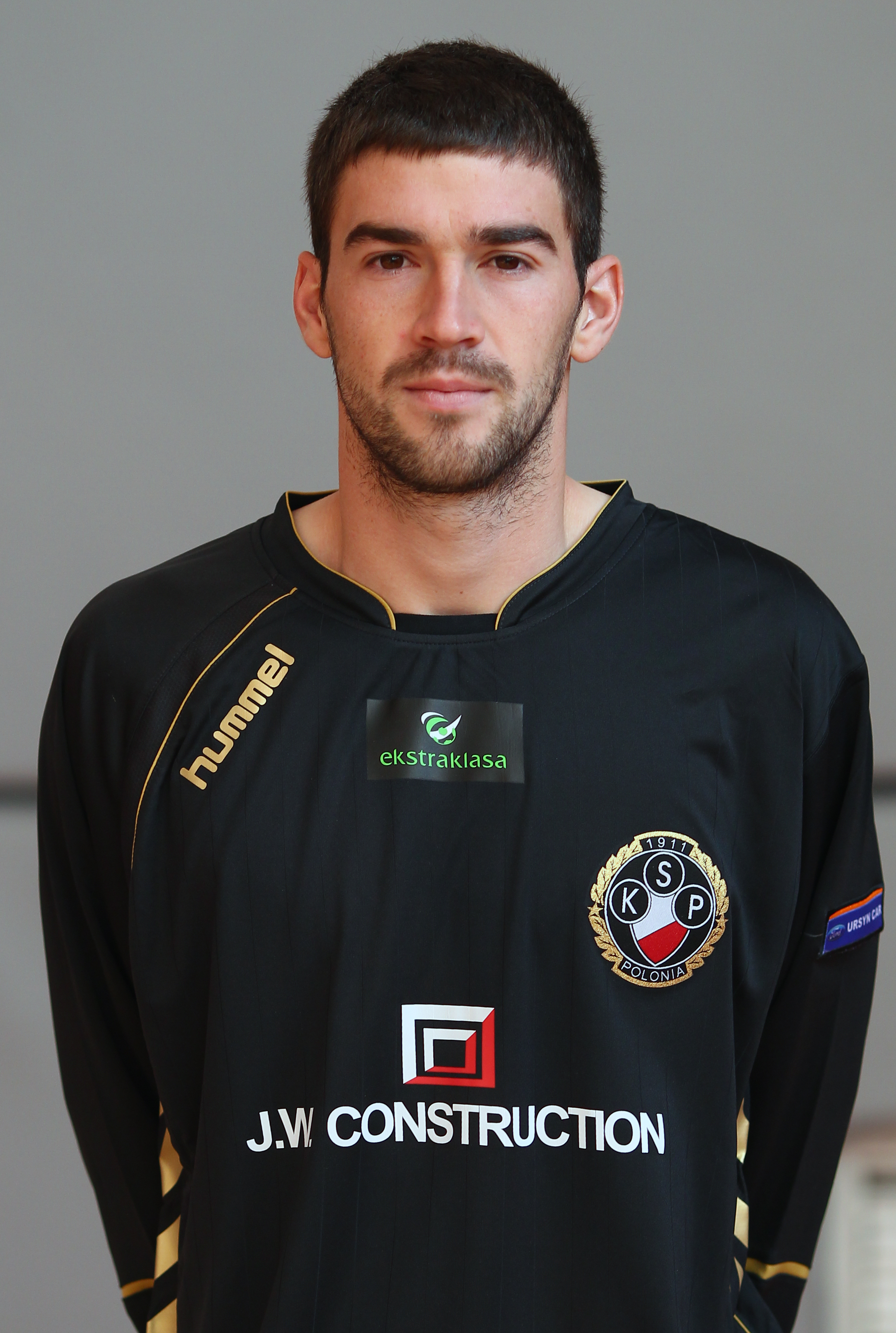

Personal information
- Full name: Miloš Adamović
- Date of birth: 19 June 1988 (age 38)
- Place of birth: Šabac, SFR Yugoslavia
- Height: 1.79 m (5 ft 10 in)
- Position: Midfielder

Youth career
- OFK Beograd

Senior career*
Years	Team	Apps	(Gls)
2006–2009	OFK Beograd	40	(0)
2006	→ Palilulac Beograd (loan)	13	(0)
2007	→ Dinamo Vranje (loan)	14	(0)
2010–2011	Sheriff Tiraspol	30	(3)
2011	→ Polonia Warsaw (loan)	3	(0)
2011	Taraz	15	(2)
2012	Sunkar	10	(1)
2013–2014	Ravan Baku	39	(10)
2014–2015	Mladost Lučani	26	(2)
2015–2016	Vasas	16	(0)
2016–2017	Radnik Surdulica	31	(3)
2017–2022	Mačva Šabac	155	(18)
2023	Javor Ivanjica	19	(0)
2024	Mačva Šabac	15	(1)
- * Club domestic league appearances and goals

Miloš Adamović (Serbian Cyrillic: Милош Адамовић; born 19 June 1988) is a Serbian retired professional footballer who played as a midfielder.

== Career ==
In February 2011, he was loaned to Polish club Polonia Warsaw on a half-year deal.

During the 2013 Adamović signed for Ravan Baku of the Azerbaijan Premier League. His first game and first goal for Ravan Baku in an Azerbaijan Premier League against Turan Tovuz PFC. In May 2014 Adamović left Ravan Baku and joined Hapoel Petah Tikva on a one-year contract. On 12 July, before he made his official debut in Hapoel Petah Tikva, he was released.

In July 2014, Adamović signed for Serbian SuperLiga newcomers Mladost Lučani.

== Career statistics ==
As of 19 May 2014

Club statistics
Season	Club	League	League		Cup		Other		Total	
Season	Club	League	App	Goals	App	Goals	App	Goals	App	Goals
2009–10	Sheriff Tiraspol	Divizia Naţională	16	1	0	0	6	0	24	1
2010–11	Sheriff Tiraspol	Divizia Naţională	14	2	0	0	6	0	20	2
2010–11	Polonia Warsaw (loan)	Ekstraklasa	3	0	1	0	—		4	0
2011	Taraz	Kazakhstan Premier League	15	2	2	0	—		17	2
2012	Sunkar	Kazakhstan Premier League	10	1			—		10	1
2012–13	Ravan Baku	Azerbaijan Premier League	12	5	2	1	—		14	6
2013–14	Ravan Baku	Azerbaijan Premier League	27	5	2	0	—		29	5
Total			97	16	7	1	12	0	116	17

== Honours ==
Sheriff Tiraspol

- Divizia Naţională: 2009–10
- Moldovan Cup: 2009–10
