= Yasyn Khamid =

Ukrainian footballer

Personal information
- Full name: Yasyn Suleymanovych Khamid
- Date of birth: 10 January 1993 (age 33)
- Place of birth: Kharkiv, Ukraine
- Height: 1.85 m (6 ft 1 in)
- Position: Striker

Youth career
- 2006–2008: UFK Kharkiv

Senior career*
Years	Team	Apps	(Gls)
2008–2009	Kharkiv	0	(0)
2009–2014	Metalurh Donetsk	0	(0)
2014	→ Stal Alchevsk (loan)	17	(0)
2015	AZAL	0	(0)
2016	Ravan Baku	15	(4)
2016	Zira	3	(0)

International career^{‡}
2008–2009	Ukraine U16	10	(3)
2009–2010	Ukraine U17	10	(3)
2010	Ukraine U18	5	(0)
- * Club domestic league appearances and goals as of 10 January 2017 ‡ National team caps and goals as of 16 August 2016

Yasyn Suleymanovych Khamid (Ukrainian: Ясин Сулейманович Хамід; born 10 January 1993) is a Ukrainian professional football striker of Egyptian descent who last played for Zira FK in the Azerbaijan Premier League.

Khamid is product of youth team systems of UFK Kharkiv. He spent 6 years played for FC Metalurh Donetsk Reserves and Youth Team and went on loan in the Ukrainian First League club FC Stal Alchevsk. He made his debut for FC Stal entering as a second-half substitute against FC Zirka Kirovohrad on 26 July 2014 in Ukrainian First League.
