= Júlio César (footballer, born January 1983) =

Brazilian footballer

Personal information
- Full name: Júlio César Mendes Moreira
- Date of birth: 19 January 1983 (age 43)
- Place of birth: Pouso Alegre, Brazil
- Height: 1.66 m (5 ft 5 in)
- Position: Left-back

Youth career
- Cruzeiro

Senior career*
Years	Team	Apps	(Gls)
2004–2005	Portuguesa Santista	0	(0)
2005	→ Inter de Limeira (loan)	0	(0)
2006	CRAC	0	(0)
2006	Belasitsa Petrich		
2006–2008	Denizlispor	46	(2)
2008–2009	Kocaelispor	18	(2)
2009	Montana	10	(0)
2010	Metalurh Donetsk	2	(0)
2010	Sriwijaya		
2011	Ipatinga	0	(0)
2011	Salgueiro	3	(0)
2012	Metropolitano	5	(0)
2013	Central	8	(1)
2014	Ravan Baku	13	(0)
2015–2016	Caldas Novas	2	(0)
2017	Bahia de Feira	0	(0)
- * Club domestic league appearances and goals

Júlio César Mendes Moreira (born 19 January 1983) is a Brazilian former professional footballer who played as a left-back.

== Career ==
=== São Paulo state ===
Born in Pouso Alegre, Minas Gerais state, César was signed by Portuguesa Santista in 2004. In January 2005 he extended his contract for one more year (until 31 October 2005) but left for Inter de Limeira on loan. He finished as the bottom club in 2005 Campeonato Paulista.

=== Europe ===
On 1 December 2005, César left for Clube Recreativo e Atlético Catalano. In January 2006 he left for Bulgarian A PFG club PFC Belasitsa.

On 1 September 2006, César signed for Süper Lig club Denizlispor on a one-year contract. He played 23 league games. On 7 August 2007, he signed a new two-year contract. In June 2008 he was transferred to fellow Süper Lig club Kocaelispor.

After being close to a signature with Terek Grozny, César then returned to Bulgaria for Montana. In January 2010 he moved again, to Ukrainian club Metalurh Donetsk on a 2 1/2-year contract.

He then played for Sriwijaya F.C. of Indonesia Super League.

=== Return to Brazil ===
In January 2011 César signed for Minas Gerais club Ipatinga. On 1 September he left for Salgueiro in short-term deal.

=== Ravan Baku ===
In January 2014 César moved to Ravan Baku in the Azerbaijan Premier League, signing an 18-month contract.

=== Later years ===
César returned to Brazil in 2015, playing in just two games in two seasons with Caldas Novas in the first division of the Campeonato Goiano, the state league in Goiás. He moved to Bahia de Feira in 2017, where he did not play any matches, before retiring from football.
