= Vladislav Kadyrov =

Azerbaijani footballer (born 1970)

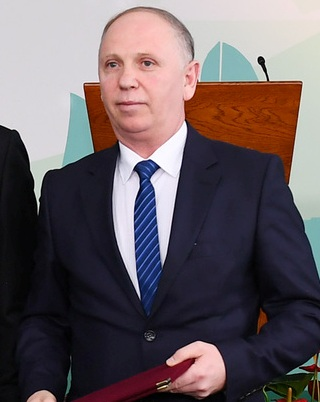

Personal information
- Full name: Vladislav Azizovich Kadyrov
- Date of birth: 16 November 1970 (age 55)
- Place of birth: Baku, Azerbaijani SSR
- Height: 1.80 m (5 ft 11 in)
- Positions: Midfielder; forward

Senior career*
Years	Team	Apps	(Gls)
1985–1991	Neftchi Baku PFC	93	(11)
1992–1994	FC Sakhalin Kholmsk	74	(54)
1995	FC Lokomotiv Nizhny Novgorod	0	(0)
1995	FC Arsenal Tula	29	(9)
1996–1997	FC Spartak Ryazan	54	(8)
1998	FC Lada-Grad Dimitrovgrad	21	(1)

International career
1994–1996	Azerbaijan	10	(0)

Managerial career
- 2007–2008: FK Mughan
- 2010–11: Ravan Baku
- 2011–12: Ravan Baku
- 2013: Ravan Baku
- * Club domestic league appearances and goals

Vladislav Azizovich Kadyrov (Russian: Владислав Азизович Кадыров; Azerbaijani: Vladislav Əziz oğlu Qədirov; born 16 November 1970) is an Azerbaijani professional football coach and a former player. He also holds Russian citizenship.

== Managerial statistics ==
As of 5 October 2013

Name	Managerial Tenure	P	W	D	L	Win %
Ravan Baku	? 2010 – 2011	?	?	?	?	0
Ravan Baku	20 September 2011 – 6 February 2012	13	5	4	4	38.46
Ravan Baku	12 August 2013 – 5 October 2013	7	1	3	3	14.29

== Honours ==
- 1987 FIFA U-16 World Championship champion for USSR.
- USSR Federation Cup finalist: 1988.
- Russian Second League top scorer: 1994 (Zone East, 34 goals).
