= 2013–14 Azerbaijan Premier League =

Azerbaijan Premier League
- Season: 2013–14
- Champions: Qarabağ
- Matches: 180
- Goals: 416 (2.31 per match)
- Top goalscorer: Reynaldo (22 goals)
- Biggest home win: Qarabağ 5–1 Sumgayit; Qarabağ 5–1 Ravan Baku
- Biggest away win: Ravan 1–5 Inter
- Highest scoring: Qarabağ 4–3 Gabala; Khazar Lankaran 4–3 Sumgayit
- Longest winning run: 7 games Qarabağ, AZAL
- Longest unbeaten run: 11 games Qarabağ
- Longest losing run: 4 games Ravan Baku, Sumgayit
- Highest attendance: 10,000; Khazar 0–0 Neftchi (25 August 2013)
- Lowest attendance: 150; Simurq 2–0 Ravan Baku (3 August 2013)
- Average attendance: 1,608

The 2013–14 Azerbaijan Premier League was the 22nd season of Azerbaijan Premier League, the top tier of Azerbaijani professional league for association football clubs, since its establishment in 1992. Neftchi Baku were the defending champions, having won the previous season.

== Teams ==
Location of teams in 2013–14 Azerbaijan Premier League

Kəpəz and Turan were relegated from the 2012–13 Azerbaijan Premier League.

The format of the league changed as a total of 10 teams contested the league, with two clubs relegated in the previous season and no teams promoted from the first division. The competition format follows the usual double round-robin format. During the course of a season, which lasts from August to May, each club plays every other club four times, twice at home and twice away, for a total of 36 games.

As of this season, PFL announced that each player will have to wear not only the number, but also his name on the back of the jersey.

=== Stadia and locations ===
Note: Table lists in alphabetical order.

Team	Location	Venue	Capacity
AZAL	Baku	AZAL Stadium	3,000
Baku	Baku	FC Baku's Training Base	2,000
Gabala	Gabala	Gabala City Stadium	4,000
Inter	Baku	Shafa Stadium	8,000
Khazar	Lankaran	Lankaran City Stadium	15,000
Neftchi	Baku	Bakcell Arena	11,000
Qarabağ	Ağdam	Tofig Bahramov Stadium	31,200
Ravan	Baku	Bayil Stadium	5,000
Simurq	Zaqatala	Zaqatala City Stadium	3,500
Sumgayit	Sumqayit	Mehdi Huseynzade Stadium	16,000

=== Personnel and kits ===
Note: Flags indicate national team as has been defined under FIFA eligibility rules. Players may hold more than one non-FIFA nationality.

Team	Manager	Team captain	Kit manufacturer	Shirt sponsor
AZAL	(Azerbaijan) Vagif Sadygov	(Azerbaijan) Jahangir Hasanzade	Umbro	Silk Way
Baku	(Serbia) Milinko Pantić	(Azerbaijan) Elvin Mammadov	Kappa	
Gabala	(Russia) Yuri Semin	(Azerbaijan) Volodimir Levin	Joma	Pepsi
Inter	(Georgia (country)) Kakhaber Tskhadadze	(Azerbaijan) Vagif Javadov	Umbro	IBA
Khazar	(Turkey) Mustafa Denizli	(Azerbaijan) Rahid Amirguliyev	Puma	Palmali
Neftçi	(Azerbaijan) Boyukagha Hajiyev	(Azerbaijan) Rashad Sadiqov	Adidas	SOCAR
Qarabağ	(Azerbaijan) Gurban Gurbanov	(Azerbaijan) Rashad Sadygov	Adidas	Azersun
Ravan	(Turkey) Güvenç Kurtar	(Azerbaijan) Ramazan Abbasov	Legea	Nissan
Simurq	(Georgia (country)) Giorgi Chikhradze	(Azerbaijan) Ruslan Poladov	Joma	
Sumgayit	(Azerbaijan) Agil Mammadov	(Azerbaijan) Samir Abbasov	Umbro	Azerkimya

=== Managerial changes ===
Team	Outgoing manager	Manner of departure	Date of vacancy	Position in table	Incoming manager	Date of appointment
Baku	(Serbia) Božidar Bandović	Sacked	20 May 2013	Pre-season	(Serbia) Milinko Pantić	14 June 2013
Gabala	(Spain) Luis Aragón (caretaker)	End of tenure as caretaker	20 May 2013	Pre-season	(Russia) Yuri Semin	21 May 2013
Sumgayit	(Germany) Bernhard Raab	Resigned	11 June 2013	Pre-season	(Azerbaijan) Agil Mammadov	12 June 2013
Neftchi	(Azerbaijan) Boyukagha Hajiyev	Resigned	25 July 2013	Pre-season	(Azerbaijan) Tarlan Ahmadov	26 July 2013
Ravan	(Azerbaijan) Ramil Aliyev	Resigned	12 August 2012	10th	(Azerbaijan) Vladislav Kadyrov	12 August 2013
Ravan	(Azerbaijan) Vladislav Kadyrov	Sacked	5 October 2013	9th	(Azerbaijan) Shahin Diniyev	7 October 2013
Neftchi	(Azerbaijan) Tarlan Ahmadov	Sacked	23 October 2013	2nd	(Azerbaijan) Nazim Suleymanov	25 October 2013
Khazar	(Wales) John Toshack	Resigned	22 November 2013	8th	(Italy) Giovanni Melkiorre (caretaker)	22 November 2013
Khazar	(Italy) Giovanni Melkiorre (caretaker)	End of tenure as caretaker	3 December 2013	8th	(Turkey) Mustafa Denizli	3 December 2013
Ravan	(Azerbaijan) Shahin Diniyev	Resigned	3 January 2014	9th	(Turkey) Güvenç Kurtar	3 January 2014
Neftchi	(Azerbaijan) Nazim Suleymanov	Resigned	8 January 2014	3rd	(Azerbaijan) Boyukagha Hajiyev	11 January 2014
AZAL	(Azerbaijan) Vagif Sadygov	Sacked	16 March 2014	8th	(Azerbaijan) Tarlan Ahmadov	17 March 2014
Khazar	(Turkey) Mustafa Denizli	Mutual Termination	16 May 2014	6th	TBD	TBD

== League table ==
Pos	Team	Pld	W	D	L	GF	GA	GD	Pts	Qualification or relegation
1	Qarabağ (C)	36	21	9	6	65	21	+44	72	Qualification for Champions League second qualifying round
2	Inter Baku	36	20	7	9	60	37	+23	67	Qualification for Europa League first qualifying round
3	Gabala	36	18	7	11	48	36	+12	61	Qualification for Europa League first qualifying round
4	Neftçi Baku	36	17	9	10	47	43	+4	60	Qualification for Europa League second qualifying round
5	Baku	36	16	9	11	53	43	+10	57	
6	Khazar Lankaran	36	12	13	11	44	49	−5	49	
7	Simurq	36	11	13	12	35	28	+7	46	
8	AZAL	36	6	13	17	29	49	−20	31	
9	Sumgayit	36	5	10	21	27	61	−34	25	
10	Ravan Baku (R)	36	4	10	22	22	66	−44	22	Relegation to Azerbaijan First Division

Source: Azerbaijan Professional Football league
Rules for classification: 1) points; 2) goal difference; 3) number of goals scored.
(C) Champions; (R) Relegated

== Results ==
=== Games 1–18 ===
Home \ Away	AZL	BAK	INT	KHA	SIM	NEF	QAR	GAB	RAV	SUM
AZAL		1–0	0–2	1–3	1–1	2–1	1–1	1–2	2–1	1–0
Baku	2–2		0–1	3–0	3–2	3–0	2–1	1–2	5–0	1–0
Inter Baku	1–2	2–2		0–0	1–2	3–1	1–2	0–1	3–2	2–0
Khazar Lankaran	1–1	2–1	0–1		0–0	0–0	0–3	0–0	1–0	4–3
Simurq	3–0	0–3	0–1	1–2		0–0	0–0	0–0	2–0	3–1
Neftçi Baku	4–1	2–1	3–1	4–1	1–0		0–0	2–1	2–1	0–0
Qarabağ	0–1	3–0	2–0	2–0	0–0	3–1		4–3	0–0	5–1
Gabala	1–0	2–0	3–2	2–0	2–1	1–2	0–1		3–0	2–0
Ravan Baku	0–0	0–0	1–5	1–1	0–3	0–2	1–1	0–1		1–1
Sumgayit	0–0	1–2	0–2	1–1	0–1	1–2	0–3	2–1	0–1	

Source: Soccerway: Azerbaijan Premier League Table
Legend: Blue = home team win; Yellow = draw; Red = away team win.

=== Games 19–36 ===
Home \ Away	AZL	BAK	INT	KHA	SIM	NEF	QAR	GAB	RAV	SUM
AZAL		1–2	1–3	2–2	0–2	0–0	0–2	1–2	0–0	2–2
Baku	1–0		0–4	2–2	2–1	2–0	0–0	1–1	5–1	0–0
Inter Baku	2–1	1–1		3–0	0–0	2–1	0–3	0–0	3–0	2–0
Khazar Lankaran	1–1	0–2	1–1		1–3	2–2	2–1	1–0	4–0	4–1
Simurq	0–0	0–1	0–1	2–2		0–0	1–0	0–0	2–0	4–0
Neftçi Baku	2–1	1–0	2–2	1–0	3–0		1–4	1–2	2–1	1–3
Qarabağ	2–1	4–0	4–1	0–1	0–0	1–1		3–0	5–1	3–0
Gabala	0–0	3–1	1–4	2–3	1–0	1–2	0–1		0–0	3–1
Ravan Baku	1–0	2–3	1–2	2–1	1–0	0–1	0–2	1–2		1–1
Sumgayit	2–1	1–1	0–1	0–1	1–1	2–0	1–0	0–3	1–1	

Source: Soccerway: Azerbaijan Premier League Table
Legend: Blue = home team win; Yellow = draw; Red = away team win.

== Season statistics ==
=== Scoring ===
- First goal of the season: Mindaugas Kalonas for Baku against Gabala (2 August 2013)
- Fastest goal of the season: 2nd minute,
  - Ernest Nfor for Neftchi Baku against Baku (10 November 2013)
- Latest goal of the season: 94 minutes,
  - Shahriyar Rahimov for AZAL against Ravan Baku (8 December 2013)
    Mahir Shukurov for Neftchi Baku against Gabala (15 December 2013)
- Largest winning margin: 5 goals
  - Baku 5–0 Ravan Baku (18 August 2013)
- Highest scoring game: 7 goals
  - Qarabağ 4–3 Gabala (3 November 2013)
- Most goals scored in a match by a single team: 5 goals
  - Qarabağ 5–1 Sumgayit (11 August 2013)
  - Baku 5–0 Ravan Baku (18 August August 2013)
  - Ravan Baku 1–5 Inter Baku (25 August 2013)
- Most goals scored in a match by a losing team: 2 goals
  - Gabala 3–2 Inter Baku (3 August 2013)

==== Top scorers ====
As of 12 May 2014

Rank	Player	Club	Goals
1	(Brazil) Reynaldo	Qarabağ	22
2	(Azerbaijan) Vagif Javadov	Inter	14
4	(Serbia) Dragan Ćeran	Simurq	13
3	(Switzerland) Danijel Subotić	Gabala	12
5	(Cameroon) Mbilla Etame	Khazar	11
6	(Georgia (country)) Bachana Tskhadadze	Inter	10
7	(Netherlands) Leroy George	Qarabağ	9
8	(Azerbaijan) Rauf Aliyev	Baku	8
8	(Brazil) Chumbinho	Qarabağ	8
8	(Azerbaijan) Afran Ismayilov	Baku	8
8	(United States) Will John	AZAL	8
12	(Brazil) Leonardo	Gabala	7
12	(Uzbekistan) Bahodir Nasimov	Neftchi	7
12	(Croatia) Stjepan Poljak	Simurq	7
12	(Brazil) Nildo	Khazar	7
12	(Netherlands) Lorenzo Ebecilio	Gabala	7

==== Hat-tricks ====
Player	For	Against	Result	Date
(Georgia (country)) Bachana Tskhadadze	Inter	Ravan	5–1	25 August 2013
(Brazil) Reynaldo	Qarabağ	Neftchi	4–1	28 February 2014
(Brazil) Reynaldo	Qarabağ	Inter	4–1	7 May 2014

=== Clean sheets ===
- Most clean sheets: 18
  - Qarabağ
- Fewest clean sheets: 4
  - Sumgayit

=== Discipline ===
==== Player ====
- Most yellow cards: 16
  - Aleksandr Shemonayev (AZAL)
- Most red cards: 3
  - Elvin Yunuszade (Neftchi Baku)
  - Ilkin Qirtimov (Simurq)

==== Club ====
- Most yellow cards: 112
  - Ravan Baku
- Most red cards: 13
  - Neftchi Baku

== Awards ==
=== Monthly awards ===
Month
Month	Player	Club
August	(Azerbaijan) Javid Huseynov	Baku
September	(Azerbaijan) Afran Ismayilov	Baku
October	(Brazil) Reynaldo	Qarabağ
November	(Azerbaijan) Vagif Javadov	Inter Baku
December	(Switzerland) Danijel Subotić	Gabala
February	(Brazil) Reynaldo	Qarabağ
March	(Brazil) Reynaldo	Qarabağ
April	(Brazil) Richard Almeida	Qarabağ
May	(Brazil) Reynaldo	Qarabağ

Last updated: 11 November 2013
Source: Azerbaijan Premier League

==== PFL Team of the Year ====

2014 PFL Team of the Year

The PFL team of the year was:

- Goalkeeper: Giorgi Lomaia (Inter)
- Defence: Bruno Bertucci (Neftchi), Mahir Shukurov (Neftchi), Denis Silva (Neftchi), Yohan Bocognano (Inter)
- Midfield: David Meza (Inter), Richard Almeida (Qarabağ), Leroy George (Qarabağ), Chumbinho (Qarabağ)
- Attack: Reynaldo (Qarabağ), Ernest Nfor (Neftchi)

== See also ==
- 2013–14 Azerbaijan Cup
- 2013 Azerbaijan Supercup
