= Ravan Baku FK =

- Full name: Rəvan Futbol Klubu
- Nickname: Aslanlar (The Lions)
- Founded: 2009; 17 years ago
- Dissolved: 2017; 9 years ago
- Ground: Bayil Stadium
- Capacity: 5,000
- Chairman: Mushfig Safiyev
- Manager: Bahman Hasanov
- League: Azerbaijan First Division
- 2015–16: 9th
Home colours	Away colours

Ravan Baku FK (Azerbaijani: Rəvan Futbol Klubu) is an Azerbaijani football club based in Baku that plays in the Azerbaijan First Division.

== History ==
The club was founded in 2009. In May 2011, the team secured their promotion to Azerbaijan Premier League after clinching second place in Azerbaijan First Division.

In the club's debut 2011–12 season, Ravan ended in 8th position in the Azerbaijan Premier League, the club's highest ever league finish. The following season, the club repeated its record by finishing 8th once again. In 2013, Ravan's ownership faced heavy criticism from local media, football experts and fans, for hiring and firing managers quite so often. Ravan were officially relegated on 17 May 2014 after suffering a 3–2 defeat at home to Baku.

=== Domestic history ===
As of 20 May 2016

Season	League									Azerbaijan Cup	Top goalscorer	
Season	Div.	Pos.	Pl.	W	D	L	GS	GA	P	Azerbaijan Cup	Name	League
2009–10	2nd	6	22	11	4	7	32	28	37	Preliminary Round		
2010–11	2nd	2	26	19	3	4	54	14	60	First round	(Azerbaijan) Asim İbrahimov	
2011–12	1st	8	31	10	11	11	39	39	41	First round	(Serbia) Miloš Zečević (Serbia) Nemanja Vidaković (Azerbaijan) Tagim Novruzov	5
2012–13	1st	8	32	12	4	16	46	53	40	1/4 Finals	(Argentina) Juan Manuel Varea	14
2013–14	1st	10	36	4	10	21	22	66	22	Semi-finals	(Serbia) Miloš Adamović	5
2014–15	2nd	3	30	21	4	5	70	22	67	Second round		
2015–16	1st	9	36	5	9	22	27	63	18	Quarter-final	(Azerbaijan) Ramazan Abbasov	5
2016–17	2nd	13	26	6	1	19	24	70	10	1/8 finals	(Azerbaijan) Mehemmed Aliyev	4

== Stadium ==
Bayil Stadium is a typical football stadium in Bayil district of Baku, Azerbaijan. The stadium was one of the venues during 2012 FIFA U-17 Women's World Cup.

== Players ==
Azerbaijani teams are limited to nine players without Azerbaijani citizenship. The squad list includes only the principal nationality of each player; several non-European players on the squad have dual citizenship with an EU country.

=== Current squad ===
As of 7 August 2016

Note: Flags indicate national team as defined under FIFA eligibility rules; some limited exceptions apply. Players may hold more than one non-FIFA nationality.

No.	Pos.	Nation	Player
1	GK	AZE	Farid Aghayev
2	GK	AZE	Tural Abbaszade
3	GK	IRI	Omid Masumi
4	DF	AZE	Afsar Mammadov
5	DF	AZE	Ulvi Kalashov
6	DF	AZE	Suleyman Mustafazade
7	DF	AZE	Farid Guliyev
8	DF	AZE	Rashad Soltanov
9	DF	AZE	Imran Tahmirazli
10	DF	AZE	Akbar Ahmadov
11	DF	AZE	Elvin Aliyev
12	DF	AZE	Eltun Khudadatov
13	MF	AZE	Elnur Abdulov

No.	Pos.	Nation	Player
14	MF	AZE	Jamshid Maharramov
15	MF	AZE	Aslan Huseynov
16	MF	AZE	Samir Abdulov
17	MF	AZE	Elmir Namazov
18	MF	AZE	Mirgasim Cabbarli
19	MF	AZE	Aziz Huseynov
20	MF	AZE	Mirkamil Hashimli
21	MF	AZE	Zeynalabdin Huseynov
22	MF	IRI	Saed Fakharishalde
23	MF	IRI	Changiz Shahriari
24	FW	AZE	Ceyhun Abdullayev
25	FW	IRI	Javid Taleb
26	FW	UKR	Yasyn Khamid

== Managers ==
As of Match played 24 October 2014

Name	Managerial Tenure	P	W	D	L	Win %
(Azerbaijan) Asim İbrahimov	? 2010 – 2011	?	?	?	?	0
(Azerbaijan) Bahman Hasanov	? 2011 – Sep 2011	6	0	3	3	0
(Azerbaijan) Vladislav Kadyrov	Sep 2011 – Feb 2012	13	5	4	4	38.46
(Azerbaijan) Bahman Hasanov	Feb 2012 – Jun 2012	14	5	4	5	35.71
(Turkey) Cevat Güler	Jul 2012 – Aug 2012	4	0	3	1	0
(Azerbaijan) Bahman Hasanov (Caretaker)	Aug 2012 – Sep 2012	2	1	0	1	50
(Bosnia and Herzegovina) Kemal Alispahić	Sept 2012 – Dec 2012	13	5	1	8	38.46
(Azerbaijan) Ramil Aliyev	Dec 2012 – Aug 2013	16	8	0	8	50
(Azerbaijan) Vladislav Kadyrov	Aug 2013 – Oct 2013	7	1	3	3	14.29
(Azerbaijan) Shahin Diniyev	Oct 2013 – Jan 2014	11	1	3	7	9.09
(Turkey) Güvenç Kurtar	Jan 2014 – May 2014	22	3	6	13	13.64
(Azerbaijan) Ramil Aliyev	Jun 2014 – Jul 2015	31	21	4	6	67.74
(Azerbaijan) Emin Quliyev	Jul 2015 – 17 Oct 2015	8	0	2	6	0
(Azerbaijan) Bahman Hasanov	17 Oct 2015 –	0	0	0	0	0
