= List of Ravan Baku FK records and statistics =

Ravan Baku is an Azerbaijani professional football club based in Baku.

This list encompasses the major records set by the club and their players in the Azerbaijan Premier League. The player records section includes details of the club's goalscorers and those who have made more than 50 appearances in first-team competitions.

== Player ==
=== Most appearances ===
As of Match played 17 May 2014

Players played over 50 competitive, professional matches only. Appearances as substitute (goals in parentheses) included in total.

	Name	Years	League	Azerbaijan Cup	Total
1	(Azerbaijan) Ramazan Abbasov	2011–Present	70 (7)	5 (0)	75 (7)
2	(Argentina) Juan Varea	2012–Present	60 (17)	6 (2)	66 (19)
3	(Sierra Leone) Samuel Barlay	2011–2013	55 (5)	3 (0)	58 (3)
4	(Azerbaijan) Tural Akhundov	2011–2013	54 (0)	3 (0)	57 (0)
5	(Argentina) Cristian Torres	2009–2012, 2013	51 (5)	2 (0)	53 (5)
6	(Serbia) Miloš Zečević	2009–2012	49 (5)	3 (1)	52 (6)

=== Overall scorers ===
As of Match played 17 May 2014
Competitive, professional matches only, appearances including substitutes appear in brackets.

	Name	Years	League	Azerbaijan Cup	Total
1	(Argentina) Juan Varea	2012–present	17 (60)	2 (6)	19 (66)
2	(Serbia) Miloš Adamović	2013–present	10 (39)	1 (4)	11 (43)
3	(Lithuania) Mindaugas Kalonas	2013	8 (13)	0 (2)	8 (15)
4	(Serbia) Nemanja Vidaković	2012	7 (27)	0 (1)	7 (28)
5	(Serbia) Miloš Zečević	2011–2013	5 (50)	1 (3)	6 (53)
5	(Azerbaijan) Ramazan Abbasov	2011–present	7 (70)	0 (5)	7 (75)
7	(Azerbaijan) Tagim Novruzov	2011–2012	5 (23)	0 (1)	5 (24)
7	(Argentina) Cristian Torres	2009–2012, 2013	5 (51)	0 (2)	5 (53)
7	(Sierra Leone) Samuel Barlay	2011–2013	5 (56)	0 (3)	5 (59)
10	(Brazil) Igor Souza	2011	4 (16)	0 (1)	4 (17)
10	(Bosnia and Herzegovina) Ekrem Hodžić	2011-2012	4 (36)	0 (1)	4 (37)
10	(Brazil) Thiago Miracema	2014–present	3 (12)	1 (3)	4 (15)
13	(Azerbaijan) Tofig Mikayilov	2012–present	3 (31)	0 (2)	3 (33)
13	(Moldova) Nicolae Orlovschi	2012–2013	3 (20)	0 (3)	3 (23)
13	(Azerbaijan) Vusal Garaev	2012-2013	1 (17)	2 (2)	3 (19)
16	(Sweden) John Pelu	2011	2 (9)	0 (0)	2 (9)
16	(Azerbaijan) Nuran Gurbanov	2012–2013	2 (17)	0 (2)	2 (19)
16	(Sweden) Sebastian Castro-Tello	2013	2 (9)	0 (0)	2 (9)
16	(Azerbaijan) Orkhan Lalayev	2012–present	1 (30)	1 (5)	2 (35)
20	(Sierra Leone) Sheriff Suma	2011-2012	1 (36)	0 (2)	1 (36)
20	(Azerbaijan) Amid Huseynov	2011-2013	1 (9)	0 (0)	1 (9)
20	(Sierra Leone) Sallieu Bundu	2012	1 (3)	0 (0)	1 (3)
20	(Azerbaijan) Emin Ibrahimov	2012	1 (7)	0 (0)	1 (7)
20	(Azerbaijan) Ayaz Mehdiyev	2012–present	1 (24)	0 (6)	1 (30)
20	(Azerbaijan) Kamil Nurähmädov	2013–present	1 (11)	0 (1)	1 (12)
20	(Tajikistan) Sokhib Suvonkulov	2013	1 (7)	0 (1)	1 (8)
20	(Azerbaijan) Huseyn Akhundov	2012–present	1 (35)	0 (4)	1 (39)
20	(Azerbaijan) Rashad Abdullayev	2013	0 (15)	1 (1)	1 (16)
20	(Czech Republic) Ivan Pecha	2013	0 (17)	1 (1)	1 (18)
20	(Azerbaijan) Elnur Abdulov	2013–present	0 (15)	1 (1)	1 (16)
20	(Nigeria) Oke Akpoveta	2014–present	1 (11)	0 (4)	1 (15)
20	(Azerbaijan) Elvin Hasanliyev	2013–present	0 (13)	1 (4)	1 (17)
20	(Azerbaijan) Yamin Ağakärimzadä	2013–present	1 (8)	0 (1)	1 (9)
20	Own Goal	2011–Present	1 (-)	0 (0)	1 (-)

== Team ==
=== Record wins ===
- Record win: 6–2 v Turan Tovuz, 2012-13 Azerbaijan Premier League, 30 March 2013
- Record League win: 6–2 v Turan Tovuz, 2012-13 Azerbaijan Premier League, 30 March 2013
- Record Azerbaijan Cup win: 5–2 v Qaradağ, 4 December 2013
- Record away win: 6–2 v Turan Tovuz, 2012-13 Azerbaijan Premier League, 30 March 2013
- Record home win 5–1 v Kəpəz, 2011-12 Azerbaijan Premier League, 28 April 2012

=== Record defeats ===
- Record defeat: 0–5

v Baku, 2013-14 Azerbaijan Premier League, 18 August 2013

- Record League defeat: 0–4

v Baku, 2013-14 Azerbaijan Premier League, 18 August 2013

- Record away defeat: 0–5

v Baku, 2013-14 Azerbaijan Premier League, 18 August 2013

- Record Azerbaijan Cup defeat: 0–5

v Khazar Lankaran, Quarterfinals 2nd leg, 7 March 2013

- Record home defeat: 3–5

v AZAL, Azerbaijan Premier League, 14 May 2013

=== Goals ===
- Most Premier League goals scored in a season: 46 – 2012–13
- Fewest League goals scored in a season: 30 – 2013-14
- Most League goals conceded in a season: 53 – 2012–13
- Fewest League goals conceded in a season: 22 – 2013-14

=== Points ===
- Most points in a season:

41 in 32 matches, Azerbaijan Premier League, 2011–12

- Fewest points in a season:

22 in 38 matches, Azerbaijan Premier League, 2013–14

== International representatives ==
As of 4 February 2014

=== Current Ravan players ===
Player	Nation	Caps	Goals	International years	Ravan years
Ramazan Abbasov	Azerbaijan	7	0	2005-	2011–12, 2013-
Jamshid Maharramov	Azerbaijan	6	0	2007-	2013–
Agil Nabiyev	Azerbaijan	9	0	2008-	2013–
Dmitri Kruglov	Estonia	91	3	2004-	2014-
Kamil Kopúnek	Slovakia	17	2	2006-	2014-
Mitja Mörec	Slovenia	14	0	2007-09	2014-

=== Former Ravan players ===
Player	Nation	Caps	Goals	International years	Ravan years
Rashad Abdullayev	Azerbaijan	10	0	2004-06	2013
Amit Guluzade	Azerbaijan	3	0	2010-	2012
Tural Jalilov	Azerbaijan	4	0	2008-	2011-2013
Nodar Mammadov	Azerbaijan	4	0	2007-	2013
Artur Kotenko	Estonia	27	0	2004-	2011
Francis Bossman	Ghana	1	0	2003	2012
Nicolae Orlovschi	Moldova	1	0	2012-	2012-13
Mindaugas Kalonas	Lithuania	43	3	2006-	2013
Samuel Barlay	Sierra Leone	17	1	2004-	2011-13
Sheriff Suma	Sierra Leone	37	8	2006-13	2011-12
Sokhib Suvonkulov	Tajikistan	38	3	2008-	2013
