= 2012–13 Ravan Baku season =

Ravan Baku
2012-13 season
- President: Mushfig Safiyev
- Manager: Bahman Hasanov; Until 8 June 2012; Cevat Güler; 12 July - 25 August 2012; Bahman Hasanov; 25 August - 24 September 2012; Kemal Alispahić; 24 September - 21 December 2012; Ramil Aliyev; 21 December 2012
- Stadium: Dalga Arena
- Premier League: 9th
- Azerbaijan Cup: Quarterfinals
- Top goalscorer: League: Juan Manuel Varea (14); All: Juan Manuel Varea (15)
- Highest home attendance: 1,200 vs Simurq; 15 September 2012; Neftchi Baku 28 October 2012; Gabala 25 November 2012
- Lowest home attendance: 200 vs Baku; 18 August 2012 vs Sumgayit; 7 April 2013 vs Kəpəz; 13 April 2013 vs Turan Tovuz; 27 April 2013
- Average home league attendance: 553
Home colours	Away colours

The Ravan Baku 2012-13 season was Ravan Baku's second Azerbaijan Premier League season. Ravan started the season under new manager Cevat Güler, having replaced Bahman Hasanov in preseason. Güler was sacked as manager on 25 August with Hasanov being brought in as caretaker manager until Ravan appointed Kemal Alispahić on 24 September. Alispahić himself was sacked on 21 December 2012, after 4 wins in 13 games, and was replaced by Ramil Aliyev. Ravan went on to finish 8th in the league. They also participate in the 2012–13 Azerbaijan Cup, reaching the Quarterfinals, where they went out 6-2 on aggregate to Khazar Lankaran.

== Squad ==
As of 4 March 2013

Note: Flags indicate national team as defined under FIFA eligibility rules; some limited exceptions apply. Players may hold more than one non-FIFA nationality.

No.	Pos.	Nation	Player
1	GK	POL	Łukasz Sapela
3	DF	SRB	Miloš Zečević (captain)
4	DF	AZE	Nodar Mammadov
5	DF	MDA	Nicolae Orlovschi
6	DF	AZE	Mukhtar Ismayilov
7	MF	AZE	Ramil Hashimzade
8	DF	AZE	Tural Akhundov
9	MF	AZE	Vusal Garaev
10	MF	LTU	Mindaugas Kalonas
12	GK	AZE	Davud Karimi
13	MF	AZE	Shahriyar Rahimov
14	FW	ARG	Juan Varea

No.	Pos.	Nation	Player
15	MF	AZE	Tural Jalilov
16	DF	AZE	Orkhan Lalayev
17	MF	AZE	Ramazan Abbasov
18	MF	SLE	Samuel Barlay
19	MF	AZE	Huseyn Akhundov
20	MF	SRB	Miloš Adamović
22	MF	AZE	Tofig Mikayilov
25	MF	AZE	Ali Aliyev
27	MF	AZE	Nuran Gurbanov (loan from Gabala)
28	MF	AZE	Emin Mustafayev
99	GK	AZE	Murad Ganbarov

== Transfers ==
=== Summer ===
In: Note: Flags indicate national team as defined under FIFA eligibility rules; some limited exceptions apply. Players may hold more than one non-FIFA nationality.

No.	Pos.	Nation	Player
1	GK	POL	Łukasz Sapela (from (Poland) GKS Bełchatów)
5	DF	MDA	Nicolae Orlovschi (from (Moldova) Olimpia)
14	FW	ARG	Juan Manuel Varea (from (Bosnia and Herzegovina) Široki Brijeg)
19	MF	AZE	Huseyn Akhundov (from (Azerbaijan) AZAL)
23	FW	SLE	Sallieu Bundu (loan from (United States) Charleston Battery)
27	MF	AZE	Nuran Gurbanov (loan from (Azerbaijan) Gabala)
28	MF	AZE	Amit Guluzade (from (Turkey) Kayseri Erciyesspor)
33	MF	GHA	Francis Bossman (from (Serbia) Sloboda Užice)

Out: Note: Flags indicate national team as defined under FIFA eligibility rules; some limited exceptions apply. Players may hold more than one non-FIFA nationality.

No.	Pos.	Nation	Player
5	DF	AZE	Natig Karimi
6	MF	AZE	Tagim Novruzov (to (Azerbaijan) AZAL)
7	MF	AZE	Elvin Musazade (loan return to (Azerbaijan) Neftchi Baku)
13	DF	AZE	Farid Hashimzade (to (Azerbaijan) Kəpəz)
14	FW	UKR	Serhiy Artiukh (to (Ukraine) Naftovyk-Ukrnafta Okhtyrka)
16	DF	AZE	Farrukh Rahimov
17	MF	AZE	Ramazan Abbasov (to (Azerbaijan) Baku)
21	FW	AZE	Jeyhun Abdullayev
22	FW	AZE	Amid Huseynov (loan return to (Azerbaijan) Khazar Lankaran)
24	DF	AZE	Huseyn Isgandarov (to (Azerbaijan) Turan Tovuz)
25	DF	AZE	Ramil Nuriyev
23	FW	SLE	Sallieu Bundu (loan return to (United States) Charleston Battery)
61	GK	RUS	Ivan Vasiliev
87	MF	GEO	George Gulordava

=== Winter ===
In: Note: Flags indicate national team as defined under FIFA eligibility rules; some limited exceptions apply. Players may hold more than one non-FIFA nationality.

No.	Pos.	Nation	Player
4	DF	AZE	Nodar Mammadov (from (Azerbaijan) Gabala)
10	MF	LTU	Mindaugas Kalonas (from (Poland) Stomil Olsztyn)
17	MF	AZE	Ramazan Abbasov (from (Azerbaijan) Baku)
20	MF	SRB	Miloš Adamović (from (Kazakhstan) Sunkar)
28	MF	AZE	Emin Mustafayev (from (Azerbaijan) Qarabağ)
--	MF	AZE	Ramil Hashimzade (from (Azerbaijan) Sumgayit)

Out: Note: Flags indicate national team as defined under FIFA eligibility rules; some limited exceptions apply. Players may hold more than one non-FIFA nationality.

No.	Pos.	Nation	Player
4	DF	BIH	Ekrem Hodžić (to (Bosnia and Herzegovina) Jedinstvo Bihać)
7	DF	AZE	Elvin Musazada (to (Azerbaijan) Qarabağ)
10	FW	SRB	Nemanja Vidaković (to (Kazakhstan) Ordabasy)
11	MF	SLE	Sheriff Suma
17	MF	AZE	Emin Ibrahimov
20	MF	ARG	Cristian Torres (to (Azerbaijan) Qarabağ)
26	MF	GHA	Francis Bossman (to (Serbia) Jagodina)
28	MF	AZE	Amit Guluzade (to (Azerbaijan) Gabala)

== Competitions ==
=== Friendlies ===
12 October 2012	Baku	0 - 0	Ravan Baku
18:00 AZST (UTC+5)		Report

=== Azerbaijan Premier League ===
==== Results summary ====
Overall								Home						Away					
Pld	W	D	L	GF	GA	GD	Pts	W	D	L	GF	GA	GD	W	D	L	GF	GA	GD
22	6	4	12	23	34	−11	22	3	2	6	13	17	−4	3	2	6	10	17	−7

Last updated: 4 March 2013.
Source: Soccerway

==== Results by round ====
Round	1	2	3	4	5	6	7	8	9	10	11	12	13	14	15	16	17	18	19	20	21	22
Ground	H	A	H	A	H	A	H	H	A	H	A	A	H	H	A	A	H	A	H	A	H	A
Result	D	L	D	D	L	W	L	L	W	W	D	L	W	L	L	L	L	L	W	W	L	L
Position	7	10	11	10	11	9	10	12	10	8	8	9	8	9	10	10	11	11	11	9	10	10

Source: Soccerway
A = Away; H = Home; W = Win; D = Draw; L = Loss

==== Results ====
3 August 2012 1	Ravan Baku	1 – 1	Khazar Lankaran	Baku
20:00 AZST (UTC+5)	Bundu 10'	Summary	Subašić 55'	Stadium: Bayil Stadium; Attendance: 600; Referee: Vusal Aliyev

11 August 2012 2	AZAL	3 – 1	Ravan Baku	Baku
18:00 AZST (UTC+5)	Nildo 4'; Benouahi 68', 73'	Summary	Varea 76'	Stadium: AZAL Stadium; Attendance: 2,500; Referee: Elchin Mammadov

18 August 2012 3	Ravan Baku	1 – 1	Baku	Baku
20:00 AZST (UTC+5)	Mikayilov 74'	Summary	Parks 88'	Stadium: Bayil Stadium; Attendance: 200; Referee: Rahim Hasanov

24 August 2012 4	Qarabağ	0 – 0	Ravan Baku	Quzanlı
20:00 AZST (UTC+5)		Summary		Stadium: Guzanli Olympic Complex Stadium; Attendance: 350; Referee: Rauf Jabbarov

15 September 2012 5	Ravan Baku	0 – 2	Simurq	Baku
AZST (UTC+5)		Summary	Božić 70'; Burkhardt 76'	Stadium: Bayil Stadium; Attendance: 1,000; Referee: Anar Salmanov

24 September 2012 6	Gabala	1 – 3	Ravan Baku	Qabala
17:00 AZST (UTC+5)	Chertoganov 37'; Chertoganov (yellow card) 72' (yellow-red card) 72'	Summary	Varea 23'; Torres 64'; Gurbanov 90+1'	Stadium: Gabala City Stadium; Attendance: 1,200; Referee: Rahim Hasanov

30 September 2012 7	Ravan Baku	1 – 2	Kəpəz	Baku
20:00 AZST (UTC+5)	Varea 40'	Summary	Fomenko 27'; Soltanov 45+1'	Stadium: Bayil Stadium; Attendance: 960; Referee: Rauf Jabbarov

4 October 2012 8	Ravan Baku	0 – 2	Inter Baku	Baku
19:00 AZST (UTC+5)		Summary	Hajiyev 27'; Tskhadadze 61'	Stadium: Bayil Stadium; Attendance: 500; Referee: Rahim Hasanov

20 October 2012 9	Sumgayit	0 – 1	Ravan Baku	Sumqayit
16:00 AZST (UTC+5)		Summary	Varea 4'	Stadium: Mehdi Huseynzade Stadium; Attendance: 8,000; Referee: Fariz Yusifov

28 October 2012 10	Ravan Baku	2 – 0	Neftchi Baku	Baku
15:30 AZT (UTC+4)	Orlovschi 33'; Varea 76' (pen.)	Summary		Stadium: Dalga Arena; Attendance: 1,000; Referee: Aliyar Ağayev

31 October 2012 11	Turan Tovuz	2 – 2	Ravan Baku	Tovuz
16:00 AZT (UTC+4)	Aghakishiyev 24'; Krutskevich 90+4'	Summary	Vidaković 77', 81'	Stadium: Tovuz City Stadium; Attendance: 4,000; Referee: Elvin Äsgärov

4 November 2012 12	Khazar Lankaran	4 – 0	Ravan Baku	Lankaran
16:00 AZT (UTC+4)	Piț 10'; Sialmas 12', 69'; Sadio 33'	Summary		Stadium: Lankaran City Stadium; Attendance: 7,200; Referee: Vusal Äliyev

19 November 2012 13	Ravan Baku	1 – 0	AZAL	Baku
16:00 AZT (UTC+4)	N.Gurbanov 84'	Summary		Stadium: Dalga Arena; Attendance: 500; Referee: Elçin Mämmädov

25 November 2012 14	Ravan Baku	1 – 3	Gabala	Baku
18:00 AZT (UTC+4)	T.Mikayilov 24'; E.Hodžić (red card) 70'	Summary	Mendy 13'; Abdullayev 36'; Abdullayev (red card) 44'; Assis 71' (pen.)	Stadium: Dalga Arena; Attendance: 1,000; Referee: Fariz Yusifov

2 December 2012 15	Inter Baku	2 – 0	Ravan Baku	Baku
16:00 AZT (UTC+4)	Tskhadadze 51' (pen.); S.Zargarov 90+4'	Summary		Stadium: Shafa Stadium; Attendance: 700; Referee: Aliyar Ağayev

10 December 2012 16	Neftchi Baku	2 – 0	Ravan Baku	Baku
18:00 AZT (UTC+4)	Seyidov 44'; Canales 63'	Summary		Stadium: Ismat Gayibov Stadium; Attendance: 1,500; Referee: Anar Salmanov

16 December 2012 17	Ravan Baku	2 – 3	Sumgayit	Baku
16:00 AZT (UTC+4)	N.Orlovschi 32'; Varea 83'	Summary	Fardjad-Azad 8'; U.Pamuk 79'; Sultanov 90+3' (pen.)	Stadium: Bayil Stadium; Attendance: 250; Referee: Rauf Jabbarov

20 December 2012 18	Simurq	3 – 0^{1}	Ravan Baku	Zaqatala
15:00 AZT (UTC+4)	Popović 90+2'	Summary		Stadium: Zaqatala City Stadium; Attendance: 2,500; Referee: Elvin Äsgärov

9 February 2013 19	Ravan Baku	2 – 0	Turan Tovuz	Baku
17:00 AZT (UTC+4)	Adamović 36'; Kalonas 71'	Summary		Stadium: Bayil Stadium; Attendance: 250

16 February 2013 20	Kəpəz	0 – 2	Ravan Baku	Ganja
15:00 AZT (UTC+4)		Summary	Kalonas 7'; Abbasov 64'	Stadium: Ganja City Stadium; Attendance: 150; Referee: Orkhan Mämmädov

22 February 2013 21	Ravan Baku	2 – 3	Qarabağ	Baku
15:00 AZT (UTC+4)	Varea 26'; Kalonas 59'; Adamović (yellow card) 29' (yellow-red card) 67'	Summary	Richard 6'; Agolli 19'; Teli 90+1'	Stadium: Dalga Arena; Attendance: 600; Referee: Elchin Mämmädov

3 March 2013 22	Baku	2 – 1	Ravan Baku	Baku
15:00 AZT (UTC+4)	Pena 19', 57'	Summary	Rahimov 12'	Stadium: Tofig Bakhramov Stadium; Attendance: 1,000; Referee: Fariz Yusifov

==== League table ====
Pos	Team	Pld	W	D	L	GF	GA	GD	Pts	Qualification
8	Khazar Lankaran	22	7	7	8	32	27	+5	28	Qualification for relegation group
9	Turan	22	6	5	11	24	35	−11	23	Qualification for relegation group
10	Sumgayit	22	5	7	10	20	39	−19	22	Qualification for relegation group
11	Ravan Baku	22	6	4	12	23	36	−13	22	Qualification for relegation group
12	Kapaz	22	2	4	16	12	45	−33	10	Qualification for relegation group

Source: Association of Football Federations of Azerbaijan and Soccerway.com
Rules for classification: 1) points; 2) goal difference; 3) number of goals scored.

Notes

- Note 1: Simurq were awarded a 3-0 victory after Ravan Baku fielded 8 foreigners during the game instead of the maximum 7.

=== Azerbaijan Premier League Relegation Group ===
==== Results summary ====
Overall								Home						Away					
Pld	W	D	L	GF	GA	GD	Pts	W	D	L	GF	GA	GD	W	D	L	GF	GA	GD
10	6	0	4	23	18	+5	18	4	0	1	11	5	+6	2	0	3	12	13	−1

Last updated: 22 May 2013.
Source: Soccerway

==== Results by round ====
Round	1	2	3	4	5	6	7	8	9	10
Ground	H	A	H	H	A	H	A	A	H	A
Result	W	W	W	W	L	W	L	L	L	W
Position	9	9	9	8	9	8	9	9	9	9

Updated to match(es) played on 22 May 2013. Source: Soccerway
A = Away; H = Home; W = Win; D = Draw; L = Loss

==== Results ====
12 March 2013 23	Ravan Baku	1 – 0	Khazar Lankaran	Baku
15:00 AZT (UTC+4)	Varea 90' (pen.)	Summary	Abdullayev (yellow card) 56' (yellow-red card) 74'	Stadium: Dalga Arena; Attendance: 300; Referee: Aliyar Ağayev

30 March 2013 24	Turan Tovuz	2 – 6	Ravan Baku	Baku
15:00 AZT (UTC+4)	Mammadov 29'; F.Aliyev 34'	Summary	Kalonas 9', 60'; Varea 58', 61', 72' (pen.); Adamović 73'	Stadium: Dalga Arena; Attendance: 155; Referee: Vusal Äliyev

7 April 2013 25	Ravan Baku	3 – 0	Sumgayit	Baku
17:00 AZST (UTC+5)	Kalonas 10'; Adamović 79'; Barlay 90+1'	Summary		Stadium: Dalga Arena; Attendance: 200; Referee: Aliyar Ağayev

13 April 2013 26	Ravan Baku	3 – 0	Kəpəz	Baku
17:00 AZST (UTC+5)	Varea 42', 55'; T.Mikayilov 57'	Summary		Stadium: Dalga Arena; Attendance: 200; Referee: Ramil Diniyev

19 April 2013 27	AZAL	3 – 2	Ravan Baku	Baku
19:00 AZST (UTC+5)	Nildo 5'; John 58', 84'	Summary	Abbasov 68'; Kalonas 90+3'	Stadium: AZAL Stadium; Attendance: 200; Referee: Vusal Äliyev

27 April 2013 28	Ravan Baku	1 – 0	Turan Tovuz	Baku
17:00 AZST (UTC+5)	A.Mehdiyev 6'	Summary		Stadium: Dalga Arena; Attendance: 200; Referee: Namiq Bäkirov

4 May 2013 29	Sumgayit	4 – 1	Ravan Baku	Baku
17:00 AZST (UTC+5)	Taktak 30'; Gurbanov 50', 89'; Akgün 67'; Gurbanov (yellow card) 29' (yellow-red card) 90+2'	Summary	Varea 34'; Lalayev (yellow card) 37' (yellow-red card) 44'; Barlay (yellow card) 55' (yellow-red card) 60'	Stadium: Bayil Stadium; Attendance: 150; Referee: Aliyar Ağayev

8 May 2013 30	Kəpəz	3 – 1	Ravan Baku	Baku
18:00 AZST (UTC+5)	Asani 41'; Serebriakov 82', 89'	Summary	Garaev 90+3'	Stadium: Dalga Arena; Attendance: 50; Referee: Orkhan Mämmädov

14 May 2013 31	Ravan Baku	3 – 5	AZAL	Baku
17:30 AZST (UTC+5)	Igbekoi 28' (o.g.); Adamović 44'; Abbasov 52'; Orlovschi (red card) 85'	Summary	Tagizade; Igbekoi 31'; Novruzov 63'; Nildo 66', 75' (pen.)	Stadium: Dalga Arena; Attendance: 400; Referee: Ramil Diniyev

20 May 2013 32	Khazar Lankaran	1 – 2	Ravan Baku	Lankaran
19:00 AZST (UTC+5)	Güleç 70'	Summary	Adamović 23'; Hashimzade (yellow card) 60' (yellow-red card) 68'; Kalonas 89'	Stadium: Lankaran City Stadium; Attendance: 3,000; Referee: Vusal Äliyev

==== Table ====
Pos	Team	Pld	W	D	L	GF	GA	GD	Pts	Qualification or relegation
7	AZAL	32	16	9	7	57	32	+25	57	
8	Khazar Lankaran	32	10	10	12	40	37	+3	40	Qualification for Europa League first qualifying round (Note: Khazar Lankaran qualified for the first qualifying round of the 2013–14 UEFA Europa League as winner of the 2012–13 Azerbaijan Cup.)
9	Ravan Baku	32	12	4	16	46	53	−7	40	
10	Sumgayit	32	9	8	15	31	49	−18	35	
11	Turan (R)	32	8	6	18	34	59	−25	30	Relegation to Azerbaijan First Division

Source: Association of Football Federations of Azerbaijan
Rules for classification: 1) points; 2) goal difference; 3) number of goals scored.
(R) Relegated

=== Azerbaijan Cup ===
28 November 2012 Second Round	Ravan Baku	2 – 1	Neftçala	Baku
18:00 AZT (UTC+4)	O.Lalayev 40'; Varea 89'	Summary	S.Abdulov 33'	Stadium: Dalga Arena; Attendance: 1,000; Referee: Ramil Diniyev

27 February 2013 Quarterfinals 1st leg	Ravan Baku	1 – 2	Khazar Lankaran	Baku
17:00 AZT (UTC+4)	Zečević 6'	Summary	Amirguliyev 74'; Pamuk 80'	Stadium: Dalga Arena; Attendance: 1,200; Referee: Rauf Jabbarov

7 March 2013 Quarterfinals 2nd leg	Khazar Lankaran	4 – 1 (6 – 2 agg.)	Ravan Baku	Lankaran
17:00 AZT (UTC+4)	Ramazanov 8', 81' (pen.), 90+2'; Olguín 28'	Summary	Adamović 69'	Stadium: Lankaran City Stadium; Attendance: 5,000; Referee: Orkhan Mammadov

== Squad statistics ==
As of 21 May 2013

=== Appearances and goals ===
No.	Pos	Nat	Player	Total		Premier League		Azerbaijan Cup	
No.	Pos	Nat	Player	Apps	Goals	Apps	Goals	Apps	Goals
1	GK	(Poland) POL	Łukasz Sapela	20	0	18+0	0	2+0	0
3	DF	(Serbia) SRB	Miloš Zečević	23	1	21+0	0	2+0	1
4	FW	(Azerbaijan) AZE	Nodar Mammadov	16	0	12+2	0	2+0	0
5	DF	(Moldova) MDA	Nicolae Orlovschi	23	3	19+1	3	3+0	0
6	MF	(Azerbaijan) AZE	Anar Hasanov	2	0	0+2	0	0+0	0
7	MF	(Azerbaijan) AZE	Ramil Hashimzade	7	0	2+4	0	0+1	0
8	DF	(Azerbaijan) AZE	Tural Akhundov	26	0	23+1	0	2+0	0
9	MF	(Azerbaijan) AZE	Vusal Garaev	6	1	1+4	1	1+0	0
10	MF	(Lithuania) LTU	Mindaugas Kalonas	15	8	12+1	8	2+0	0
11	MF	(Azerbaijan) AZE	Anar Hüseynov	2	0	0+2	0	0+0	0
12	GK	(Azerbaijan) AZE	Sadiq Ramazanov	1	0	1+0	0	0+0	0
13	MF	(Azerbaijan) AZE	Shahriyar Rahimov	29	1	24+2	1	1+2	0
14	FW	(Argentina) ARG	Juan Manuel Varea	34	15	31+0	14	2+1	1
15	MF	(Azerbaijan) AZE	Tural Jalilov	14	0	9+4	0	0+1	0
16	DF	(Azerbaijan) AZE	Orkhan Lalayev	15	1	12+2	0	1+0	1
17	MF	(Azerbaijan) AZE	Ramazan Abbasov	13	2	6+5	2	2+0	0
18	MF	(Sierra Leone) SLE	Samuel Barlay	30	1	27+1	1	2+0	0
19	MF	(Azerbaijan) AZE	Huseyn Akhundov	13	0	5+7	0	0+1	0
20	MF	(Serbia) SRB	Miloš Adamović	14	6	12+0	5	2+0	1
22	MF	(Azerbaijan) AZE	Tofig Mikayilov	33	3	19+12	3	2+0	0
25	MF	(Azerbaijan) AZE	Ayaz Mehdiyev	12	1	9+2	1	1+0	0
27	MF	(Azerbaijan) AZE	Nuran Gurbanov	19	2	16+1	2	2+0	0
28	MF	(Azerbaijan) AZE	Emin Mustafayev	2	0	2+0	0	0+0	0
	MF	(Azerbaijan) AZE	Ali Aliyev	3	0	0+3	0	0+0	0
	MF	(Azerbaijan) AZE	Camil Rahimli	1	0	1+0	0	0+0	0
Players who appeared for Raven Baku no longer at the club:
4	DF	(Bosnia and Herzegovina) BIH	Ekrem Hodžić	10	0	9+1	0	0+0	0
7	DF	(Azerbaijan) AZE	Elvin Musazada	4	0	2+2	0	0+0	0
10	FW	(Serbia) SRB	Nemanja Vidaković	14	2	3+10	2	1+0	0
11	DF	(Sierra Leone) SLE	Sheriff Suma	11	0	5+5	0	1+0	0
12	GK	(Azerbaijan) AZE	Davud Karimi	15	0	13+1	0	1+0	0
17	MF	(Azerbaijan) AZE	Emin Ibrahimov	7	1	4+3	1	0+0	0
20	MF	(Argentina) ARG	Cristian Torres	18	1	15+2	1	1+0	0
23	FW	(Sierra Leone) SLE	Sallieu Bundu	3	1	3+0	1	0+0	0
26	MF	(Ghana) GHA	Francis Bossman	16	0	11+4	0	0+1	0
28	MF	(Azerbaijan) AZE	Amit Guluzade	11	0	4+7	0	0+0	0

=== Goal scorers ===
Place	Position	Nation	Number	Name	Premier League	Azerbaijan Cup	Total
1	FW	(Argentina)	14	Juan Manuel Varea	14	1	15
2	MF	(Lithuania)	10	Mindaugas Kalonas	8	0	8
3	MF	(Serbia)	20	Miloš Adamović	5	1	6
4	MF	(Azerbaijan)	22	Tofig Mikayilov	3	0	3
4	DF	(Moldova)	5	Nicolae Orlovschi	3	0	3
6	FW	(Serbia)	10	Nemanja Vidaković	2	0	2
6	MF	(Azerbaijan)	27	Nuran Gurbanov	2	0	2
6	MF	(Azerbaijan)	17	Ramazan Abbasov	2	0	2
8	MF	(Sierra Leone)	23	Sallieu Bundu	1	0	1
8	MF	(Argentina)	20	Cristian Torres	1	0	1
8	MF	(Azerbaijan)	17	Emin Ibrahimov	1	0	1
8	MF	(Azerbaijan)	13	Shahriyar Rahimov	1	0	1
8	MF	(Sierra Leone)	18	Samuel Barlay	1	0	1
8	MF	(Azerbaijan)	25	Ayaz Mehdiyev	1	0	1
8	MF	(Azerbaijan)	9	Vusal Garaev	1	0	1
8	DF	(Azerbaijan)	16	Orkhan Lalayev	0	1	1
8	DF	(Serbia)	3	Miloš Zečević	0	1	1
				TOTALS	46	4	50

=== Disciplinary record ===
Number	Nation	Position	Name	Premier League		Azerbaijan Cup		Total	
Number	Nation	Position	Name	Yellow card	Red card	Yellow card	Red card	Yellow card	Red card
3	(Serbia)	DF	Miloš Zečević	6	0	1	0	7	0
4	(Azerbaijan)	DF	Nodar Mammadov	2	0	0	0	2	0
4	(Bosnia and Herzegovina)	DF	Ekrem Hodžić	4	1	0	0	4	1
5	(Moldova)	DF	Nicolae Orlovschi	6	1	0	0	6	1
7	(Azerbaijan)	MF	Ramil Hashimzade	2	1	0	0	2	1
8	(Azerbaijan)	DF	Tural Akhundov	2	0	0	0	2	0
9	(Azerbaijan)	MF	Vusal Garaev	0	0	1	0	1	0
10	(Lithuania)	MF	Mindaugas Kalonas	4	0	0	0	4	0
11	(Sierra Leone)	DF	Sheriff Suma	1	0	0	0	1	0
12	(Azerbaijan)	GK	Davud Karimi	2	0	0	0	2	0
13	(Azerbaijan)	MF	Shahriyar Rahimov	8	0	1	0	9	0
14	(Argentina)	FW	Juan Manuel Varea	4	0	0	0	4	0
16	(Azerbaijan)	DF	Orkhan Lalayev	6	1	1	0	7	1
17	(Azerbaijan)	MF	Ramazan Abbasov	2	0	0	0	2	0
18	(Sierra Leone)	MF	Samuel Barlay	14	1	0	0	14	1
19	(Azerbaijan)	MF	Huseyn Akhundov	2	0	1	0	3	0
20	(Argentina)	MF	Cristian Torres	4	0	0	0	4	0
20	(Serbia)	MF	Miloš Adamović	7	1	1	0	8	1
22	(Azerbaijan)	MF	Tofig Mikayilov	2	0	0	0	2	0
25	(Azerbaijan)	MF	Ayaz Mehdiyev	1	0	0	0	1	0
26	(Ghana)	MF	Francis Bossman	4	0	1	0	5	0
27	(Azerbaijan)	MF	Nuran Gurbanov	5	0	0	0	54	0
28	(Azerbaijan)	MF	Amit Guluzade	1	0	0	0	1	0
			TOTALS	89	6	8	0	97	6
