= 2011–12 Ravan Baku season =

Ravan Baku
2011–12 season
- President: Mushfig Safiyev
- Manager: Bahman Hasanov until 20 September 2011; Vladislav Kadyrov; 20 September 2011 – 5 February 2012; Bahman Hasanov from 6 February 2012
- Stadium: Dalga Arena
- Premier League: 8th
- Azerbaijan Cup: First Round vs Baku
- Top goalscorer: League: 3 Players (5); All: 3 Players (5)
Home colours	Away colours

The Ravan Baku 2011–12 season was Ravan Baku's first Azerbaijan Premier League season, which they finished in 8th place. They also took part in the 2011–12 Azerbaijan Cup, getting knocked out in the first round by FK Baku on penalties. Ravan Baku started the season under Bahman Hasanov who Resigned on 20 September 2011, being replaced by Vladislav Kadyrov who in turn was sacked on 5 February 2012, to be replaced by Bahman Hasanov.

== Squad ==
As of 28 January 2012

Note: Flags indicate national team as defined under FIFA eligibility rules; some limited exceptions apply. Players may hold more than one non-FIFA nationality.

No.	Pos.	Nation	Player
3	DF	SRB	Miloš Zečević (captain)
4	DF	BIH	Ekrem Hodžić
5	MF	AZE	Natig Karimi
6	MF	AZE	Tagim Novruzov
7	MF	AZE	Elvin Musazade
8	DF	AZE	Tural Akhundov
9	MF	AZE	Vusal Garaev
10	FW	SRB	Nemanja Vidaković
11	MF	SLE	Sheriff Suma
12	GK	AZE	Davud Karimi
13	DF	AZE	Farid Hashimzade
14	FW	UKR	Serhiy Artiukh
15	MF	AZE	Tural Jalilov

No.	Pos.	Nation	Player
16	DF	AZE	Farrukh Rahimov
17	MF	AZE	Ramazan Abbasov
18	MF	SLE	Samuel Barlay
20	MF	ARG	Cristian Torres
21	MF	AZE	Jeyhun Abdullayev
22	FW	AZE	Amid Huseynov (on loan from Khazar Lankaran)
24	DF	AZE	Huseyn Iskanderov
25	MF	AZE	Orkhan Lalayev
30	DF	AZE	Maharram Muslumzadeh
61	GK	RUS	Ivan Vasiliev
87	MF	GEO	George Gulordava
90	MF	RUS	Sergey Chernyshev
-	DF	AZE	Ramil Nuriyev

== Transfers ==
=== Summer ===
In: Note: Flags indicate national team as defined under FIFA eligibility rules; some limited exceptions apply. Players may hold more than one non-FIFA nationality.

No.	Pos.	Nation	Player
1	GK	EST	Artur Kotenko (from (Cyprus) AEP Paphos)
3	DF	SRB	Miloš Zečević (from (Azerbaijan) Mughan)
4	DF	BIH	Ekrem Hodžić (from (Azerbaijan) Mughan)
5	MF	AZE	Natig Karimi (from (Azerbaijan) Absheron)
6	MF	AZE	Tagim Novruzov (from (Azerbaijan) Mughan)
7	MF	BRA	Igor Souza (from (Azerbaijan) Mughan)
8	DF	AZE	Tural Akhundov (from (Azerbaijan) Mughan)
9	FW	SWE	John Pelu (from (Azerbaijan) Mughan)
10	FW	URU	Angel Gutiérrez (from (Azerbaijan) Mughan)
11	DF	SLE	Sheriff Suma (from (Sweden) Jönköpings Södra)
12	GK	AZE	Davud Karimi (from (Azerbaijan) Mughan)
13	DF	AZE	Farid Hashimzade (from (Azerbaijan) Mughan)
15	MF	AZE	Tural Jalilov (on loan from (Azerbaijan) Khazar Lankaran)
17	MF	AZE	Ramazan Abbasov (from (Azerbaijan) Kəpəz)
18	MF	SLE	Samuel Barlay (from (Azerbaijan) Mughan)
19	FW	CMR	Bong Bertrand (from (Oman) Saham Club)
20	MF	ARG	Cristian Torres (from (Azerbaijan) Gabala)
21	MF	AZE	Jeyhun Abdullayev (from (Azerbaijan) Mughan)
22	FW	AZE	Amid Huseynov (on loan from (Azerbaijan) Khazar Lankaran)
30	MF	RUS	Sharapudin Shalbuzov (from (Russia) Anzhi Makhachkala)
87	MF	GEO	George Gulordava (from (Azerbaijan) Mughan)
90	MF	RUS	Sergey Chernyshev (from (Azerbaijan) Mughan)
—	DF	AZE	Elkhan Jabrailov (from (Azerbaijan) Mughan)
—	MF	AZE	Anar Gasimov (from (Azerbaijan) Mughan)

Out: Note: Flags indicate national team as defined under FIFA eligibility rules; some limited exceptions apply. Players may hold more than one non-FIFA nationality.

No.	Pos.	Nation	Player
—	GK	AZE	Kamil Qafarov (released)
—	GK	AZE	Elchin Jafarov Qafarov (released)
—	GK	AZE	Kenan Hajiyev (released)
—	DF	AZE	Mushfig Gambarov (released)
—	DF	AZE	Bakhtiyar Mehraliyev (released)
—	DF	AZE	Shahin Khasayly (released)
—	DF	AZE	Rashad Mammadov (released)
—	DF	AZE	Shikhgayib Shikhgayibov (released)
—	DF	AZE	Elchin Hashimov (released)
—	GK	AZE	Tarik Gasymov (released)
—	DF	AZE	Fakhraddin Murvatov (released)
—	MF	AZE	Samed Rzayev (released)
—	MF	AZE	Javid Rajabov (released)
—	MF	AZE	Elnur Huseynov (released)
—	MF	AZE	Farkhad Iskanderov (released)
—	MF	AZE	Agshin Hashimov (released)
—	MF	AZE	Eldar Ismayilov (released)
—	MF	AZE	Asif Zeynalov (released)
—	FW	AZE	Izzatali Suleymanov (released)
—	FW	AZE	Zahid Tayibov (released)
—	FW	AZE	Emin Amiraslanov (released)
—	FW	AZE	Zaur Mammadov (released)
—	MF	NGR	Abu Abedi Kanu (released)

=== Winter ===
In: Note: Flags indicate national team as defined under FIFA eligibility rules; some limited exceptions apply. Players may hold more than one non-FIFA nationality.

No.	Pos.	Nation	Player
7	MF	AZE	Elvin Musazade (on loan from (Azerbaijan) Neftchi Baku)
9	MF	AZE	Vusal Garaev (from (Azerbaijan) AZAL)
10	FW	SRB	Nemanja Vidaković (from (Bosnia and Herzegovina) Borac Banja Luka)
14	FW	UKR	Serhiy Artiukh (from (Azerbaijan) Turan Tovuz)
25	DF	AZE	Orkhan Lalayev (loan return from (Azerbaijan) FC Shusha)
30	MF	AZE	Maharram Muslumzade (from (Azerbaijan) Turan Tovuz)
61	GK	RUS	Ivan Vasiliev (from (Azerbaijan) Karvan)
—	DF	AZE	Elmar Yehyabeyov (from (Azerbaijan) Shahdag Qusar)
—	DF	AZE	Ramil Nuriyev (from (Azerbaijan) Sumgayit)
—	DF	AZE	Asif Zeynalov (from (Azerbaijan) Bakili Baku)

Out: Note: Flags indicate national team as defined under FIFA eligibility rules; some limited exceptions apply. Players may hold more than one non-FIFA nationality.

No.	Pos.	Nation	Player
1	GK	EST	Artur Kotenko (to (Finland) FF Jaro)
7	MF	BRA	Igor Souza
9	FW	SWE	John Pelu (to (Norway) Strindheim IL)
10	FW	URU	Ángel Gutiérrez (to (Guatemala) Deportivo Mictlán)
19	FW	CMR	Bong Bertrand (to (Bahrain) Al-Ahli)
30	MF	RUS	Sharapudin Shalbuzov
—	DF	AZE	Elkhan Jabrailov
—	MF	AZE	Anar Gasymov (to (Azerbaijan) FK Neftchala)
—	DF	AZE	Sabuhi Hasanov

== Competitions ==
=== Azerbaijan Premier League ===
==== Results summary ====
Overall								Home						Away					
Pld	W	D	L	GF	GA	GD	Pts	W	D	L	GF	GA	GD	W	D	L	GF	GA	GD
22	6	7	9	23	29	−6	25	2	5	4	10	14	−4	4	2	5	13	15	−2

Last updated: 21 December 2011.
Source: Soccerway

==== Results by round ====
Round	1	2	3	4	5	6	7	8	9	10	11	12	13	14	15	16	17	18	19	20	21	22
Ground	A	H	A	H	A	H	A	A	H	A	H	H	A	A	H	H	A	H	H	A	H	A
Result	L	L	D	D	L	D	W	W	D	W	L	D	D	W	L	D	L	W	W	L	L	L
Position																						

Source: Soccerway
A = Away; H = Home; W = Win; D = Draw; L = Loss

==== Results ====
6 August 2011 1	Kəpəz	3 – 2	Ravan Baku	Ganja City Stadium
18:00 AZST (UTC+5)	Junivan 37'; Sultanov 85', 88'	Summary	Zečević 77' (pen.); Pelu 37'	Attendance: 5,200; Referee: Rauf Jabbarov

14 August 2011 2	Ravan Baku	0 – 1	Neftchi	Dalga Arena
18:00 AZST (UTC+5)		Summary	Nasimov 17'; Alessandro (yellow card) 88' (yellow-red card) 90+2'	Attendance: 2,000; Referee: Elnur Muradov

20 August 2011 3	Simurq	1 – 1	Ravan Baku	Zaqatala City Stadium
20:00 AZST (UTC+5)	Khalilov 82'	Summary	Abbasov 90+4'	Attendance: 2,000; Referee: Fariz Yusifov

27 August 2011 4	Ravan Baku	1 – 1	Khazar Lankaran	Dalga Arena
	Igor Souza 35'	Summary	Doman 54'	Attendance: 1,200

10 September 2011 5	Baku	3 – 2	Ravan Baku	Tofig Bakhramov Stadium
	Šolić 7', 30'; Ivanovs 20'	Summary	Novruzov (red card) 48'; Torres 70'; Barlay 79'	Attendance: 300

18 September 2011 6	Ravan Baku	0 – 0	Sumgayit	Dalga Arena
		Summary		Attendance: 300

23 September 2011 7	Turan Tovuz	0 – 1	Ravan Baku	Tovuz City Stadium
		Summary	Igor Souza 60'	Attendance: 1,500

29 September 2011 8	Gabala	2 – 3	Ravan Baku	Gabala City Stadium
	M Hüseynov 7'; Dodo 77'	Summary	M Hüseynov 21' (o.g.); Pelu 35'; Barlay 52'; Suma (red card) 76'	Attendance: 1,500; Referee: Jeyhun Hashimov

16 October 2011 9	Ravan Baku	1 – 1	Qarabağ	Dalga Arena
	Zečević 90+3'	Summary	Leo Rocha 75'	Attendance: 800

22 October 2011 10	AZAL	1 – 2	Ravan Baku	AZAL Stadium
	Mammadov 35'	Summary	Zečević 27'; Hodžić 89'	Attendance: 1,100

28 October 2011 11	Ravan Baku	1 – 2	Inter Baku	Dalga Arena
	Hodžić 90+1'	Summary	Kandelaki 13'; Abdulov 44'	Attendance: 800

4 November 2011 12	Raven Baku	1 – 1	Simurq	Dalga Arena
16:00 AZST (UTC+5)	Barlay 15'; Hodzic (yellow card) 43' (yellow-red card) 56'	Summary	Yanotovskiy (yellow card) 43' (yellow-red card) 63'; Rubins 72'	Attendance: 250; Referee: Rammil Diniyev

19 November 2011 13	Khazar Lankaran	1 – 1	Ravan Baku	Lankaran City Stadium
	Amirguliev 88'	Summary	Torres 90'	Attendance: 6,000

25 November 2011 14	Sumgayit	0 – 1	Ravan Baku	Mehdi Huseynzade Stadium
		Summary	Suma 18'	Attendance: 150

4 December 2011 15	Ravan Baku	1 – 2	Kəpəz	Dalga Arena
	Igor Souza 57'	Summary	Fomenko 39'; Parkhachev 43'	Attendance: 200

10 December 2011 16	Ravan Baku	0 – 0	Baku	Dalga Arena
		Summary		Attendance: 300

14 December 2011 17	Qarabağ	2 – 0	Ravan Baku	Guzanli Olympic Stadium
	Ismayilov 72', 76' (pen.)	Summary		Attendance: 2,000

20 December 2011 18	Ravan Baku	3 – 1	AZAL	Dalga Arena
	Huseynov 34'; Barlay 45+1'; Igor Souza 60'	Summary	Benouahi 70'	Attendance: 200

15 February 2012 19	Ravan Baku	2 – 1	Turan Tovuz	Dalga Arena
	Vidaković 17', 45'	Summary	Tagiyev 45'

21 February 2012 20	Neftchi	1 – 0	Ravan Baku	Ismat Gayibov Stadium
	Flavinho 83'	Summary		Attendance: 1,000

2 March 2012 21	Ravan Baku	0 – 4	Gabala	Dalga Arena
	Vasiliev (yellow card) 76' (yellow-red card) 77'	Summary	Mendy 3'; Kamanan 9', 25'; Burton 83'

6 March 2012 22	Inter Baku	1 – 0	Ravan Baku	Shafa Stadium
	Niasse 43'	Summary

==== Table ====
Pos	Team	Pld	W	D	L	GF	GA	GD	Pts	Qualification
6	Gabala	22	10	5	7	27	23	+4	35	Qualification for championship group
7	AZAL	22	8	5	9	35	35	0	29	Qualification for relegation group
8	Ravan Baku	22	6	7	9	23	29	−6	25	Qualification for relegation group
9	Kapaz	22	6	4	12	26	38	−12	22	Qualification for relegation group
10	Simurq	22	5	4	13	18	34	−16	19	Qualification for relegation group

Source: Soccerway: Azerbaijan Premier League Table
Rules for classification: 1) points; 2) goal difference; 3) number of goals scored.

=== Azerbaijan Premier League Relegation Group ===
11 March 2012 23	Sumgayit	0 – 1	Ravan Baku	Sumgayit
14:00 AZT (UTC+4)	Mustafayev (penalty missed) 66'	Summary	Zečević (penalty missed) 38'; Zečević 90'	Stadium: Mehdi Huseynzade Stadium; Attendance: 100; Referee: Rauf Jabbarov

18 March 2012 24	Ravan Baku	2 – 0	AZAL	Baku
16:00 AZT (UTC+4)	Hodžić 18'; Novruzov 41' (pen.)	Summary		Stadium: Dalga Arena; Attendance: 200; Referee: Alik Yunusov

25 March 2012 25	Turan Tovuz	2 – 1	Ravan Baku	Tovuz
15:00 AZT (UTC+4)	Mammadov 45+1'; Beriashvili 58'	Summary	Novruzov 45'; Novruzov (yellow card) 61' (yellow-red card) 73'	Stadium: Tovuz City Stadium; Attendance: 1,500; Referee: Elvin Äsgärov

2 April 2012 26	Kəpəz	1 – 0	Ravan Baku	Ganja
16:00 AZST (UTC+5)	Fomenko 45' (pen.)	Summary		Stadium: Ganja City Stadium; Attendance: 8,000; Referee: Fariz Yusifov

8 April 2012 27	Ravan Baku	0 – 0	Simurq	Baku
18:15 AZST (UTC+5)		Summary		Stadium: Dalga Arena; Attendance: 1,350; Referee: Rauf Jabbarov

14 April 2012 28	AZAL	1 – 1	Ravan Baku	Baku
16:00 AZST (UTC+5)	Hodžić 47'	Summary	Benouahi 58'	Stadium: AZAL Arena; Attendance: 300; Referee: Elvin Äsgärov

21 April 2012 29	Ravan Baku	2 – 2	Turan	Baku
16:00 AZST (UTC+5)	Novruzov 54' (pen.); Novruzov (yellow card) 44' (red card) 60'; Zečević 83' (pen.)	Summary	Beriashvili 84'; Gogoberishvili 88' (pen.)	Stadium: Dalga Arena; Attendance: 100; Referee: Anar Salmanov

28 April 2012 30	Ravan Baku	5 – 1	Kəpəz	Baku
16:30 AZST (UTC+5)	Vidaković 24'; Torres 56', 90+3'; Abbasov 71', 84'	Summary	Emad (yellow card) 39' (yellow-red card) 42'; Fomenko 75'	Stadium: Dalga Arena; Attendance: 200; Referee: Fariz Yusifov

6 May 2012 31	Simurq	1 – 1	Ravan Baku	Zaqatala
17:30 AZST (UTC+5)	Ramaldanov 8'	Summary	Vidaković 85'; Barlay (yellow card) 22' (yellow-red card) 90+3'	Stadium: Zaqatala City Stadium; Attendance: 500; Referee: Fuad Häsänov

11 May 2012 32	Ravan Baku	3 – 2	Sumgayit	Baku
17:30 AZST (UTC+5)	Novruzov 32', 35'; Vidaković 53'	Summary	Pamuk 10'; Aliyev 26'	Stadium: Dalga Arena; Attendance: 2,000; Referee: Aliyar Ağayev

==== Table ====
Pos	Team	Pld	W	D	L	GF	GA	GD	Pts	Qualification or relegation
7	AZAL	32	12	8	12	44	44	0	44	
8	Ravan Baku	32	10	11	11	39	39	0	41	
9	Simurq	32	8	10	14	27	41	−14	34	
10	Kapaz	32	9	5	18	35	55	−20	32	
11	Turan (R)	32	6	7	19	26	42	−16	25	Qualification for relegation playoffs
12	Sumgayit (R)	32	6	6	20	27	52	−25	24	Relegation to Azerbaijan First Division

Source: Soccerway.com
Rules for classification: 1) points; 2) goal difference; 3) number of goals scored.
(R) Relegated

=== Azerbaijan Cup ===
30 November 2011 First Round	Baku	0 – 0 (a.e.t.) (3 – 2 p)	Ravan Baku	Baku
13:30 AZT (UTC+4)		Summary		Stadium: Tofig Bakhramov Stadium; Attendance: 1,000; Referee: Rovshan Ahmadov

== Squad statistics ==
As of 15 May 2012

=== Appearances and goals ===
No.	Pos	Nat	Player	Total		Premier League		Azerbaijan Cup	
No.	Pos	Nat	Player	Apps	Goals	Apps	Goals	Apps	Goals
3	DF	(Serbia) SRB	Miloš Zečević	30	5	29+0	5	1+0	0
4	DF	(Bosnia and Herzegovina) BIH	Ekrem Hodžić	27	4	26+0	4	1+0	0
5	MF	(Azerbaijan) AZE	Natig Karimi	20	0	16+3	0	1+0	0
6	MF	(Azerbaijan) AZE	Tagim Novruzov	23	5	19+3	5	0+1	0
7	MF	(Azerbaijan) AZE	Elvin Musazade	8	0	6+2	0	0+0	0
8	DF	(Azerbaijan) AZE	Tural Akhundov	32	0	31+0	0	1+0	0
9	MF	(Azerbaijan) AZE	Vusal Garaev	9	0	4+5	0	0+0	0
10	FW	(Serbia) SRB	Nemanja Vidaković	14	5	14+0	5	0+0	0
11	DF	(Sierra Leone) SLE	Sheriff Suma	29	1	28+0	1	1+0	0
12	GK	(Azerbaijan) AZE	Davud Karimi	26	0	24+1	0	1+0	0
13	DF	(Azerbaijan) AZE	Farid Hashimzade	16	0	8+8	0	0+0	0
14	FW	(Ukraine) UKR	Serhiy Artiukh	8	0	5+3	0	0+0	0
15	MF	(Azerbaijan) AZE	Tural Jalilov	17	0	10+6	0	0+1	0
16	DF	(Azerbaijan) AZE	Farrukh Rahimov	1	0	0+1	0	0+0	0
17	MF	(Azerbaijan) AZE	Ramazan Abbasov	32	3	21+10	3	1+0	0
18	MF	(Sierra Leone) SLE	Samuel Barlay	29	4	26+2	4	1+0	0
20	MF	(Argentina) ARG	Cristian Torres	29	4	22+6	4	1+0	0
21	FW	(Azerbaijan) AZE	Jeyhun Abdullayev	3	0	0+3	0	0+0	0
22	FW	(Azerbaijan) AZE	Amid Huseynov	9	1	1+8	1	0+0	0
24	DF	(Azerbaijan) AZE	Huseyn Iskanderov	14	0	11+2	0	1+0	0
25	DF	(Azerbaijan) AZE	Ramil Nuriyev	2	0	1+1	0	0+0	0
30	DF	(Azerbaijan) AZE	Maharram Muslumzadeh	1	0	1+0	0	0+0	0
61	GK	(Russia) RUS	Ivan Vasiliev	4	0	4+0	0	0+0	0
87	MF	(Georgia (country)) GEO	George Gulordava	5	0	4+1	0	0+0	0
90	MF	(Russia) RUS	Sergey Chernyshev	14	0	1+13	0	0+0	0
Players who appeared for Raven Baku no longer at the club:
1	GK	(Estonia) EST	Artur Kotenko	4	0	4+0	0	0+0	0
7	MF	(Brazil) BRA	Igor Souza	17	4	16+0	4	1+0	0
9	FW	(Sweden) SWE	John Pelu	9	2	9+0	2	0+0	0
10	FW	(Uruguay) URU	Ángel Gutiérrez	11	0	10+1	0	0+0	0
19	FW	(Cameroon) CMR	Bong Bertrand	1	0	0+1	0	0+0	0
30	MF	(Russia) RUS	Sharapudin Shalbuzov	8	0	2+6	0	0+0	0

=== Goal scorers ===
Place	Position	Nation	Number	Name	Premier League	Azerbaijan Cup	Total
1	DF	(Serbia)	3	Miloš Zečević	5	0	5
1	FW	(Serbia)	10	Nemanja Vidaković	5	0	5
1	MF	(Azerbaijan)	6	Tagim Novruzov	5	0	5
4	MF	(Brazil)	7	Igor Souza	4	0	4
4	MF	(Sierra Leone)	18	Samuel Barlay	4	0	4
4	DF	(Bosnia and Herzegovina)	4	Ekrem Hodžić	4	0	4
4	MF	(Argentina)	20	Cristian Torres	4	0	4
8	MF	(Azerbaijan)	17	Ramazan Abbasov	3	0	3
9	FW	(Sweden)	9	John Pelu	2	0	2
9	MF	(Sierra Leone)	11	Sheriff Suma	1	0	1
9	FW	(Azerbaijan)	22	Amid Huseynov	1	0	1
9				Own goal	1	0	1
				TOTALS	39	0	39

=== Disciplinary record ===
Number	Nation	Position	Name	Premier League		Azerbaijan Cup		Total	
Number	Nation	Position	Name	Yellow card	Red card	Yellow card	Red card	Yellow card	Red card
3	(Serbia)	DF	Miloš Zečević	7	0	0	0	7	0
4	(Bosnia and Herzegovina)	DF	Ekrem Hodžić	9	1	0	0	9	1
5	(Azerbaijan)	MF	Natig Karimi	2	0	0	0	2	0
6	(Azerbaijan)	MF	Tagim Novruzov	10	3	0	0	10	3
7	(Brazil)	MF	Igor Souza	5	0	0	0	5	0
8	(Azerbaijan)	DF	Tural Akhundov	6	0	0	0	6	0
9	(Sweden)	FW	John Pelu	3	0	0	0	3	0
10	(Uruguay)	FW	Ángel Gutiérrez	3	0	0	0	3	0
10	(Serbia)	FW	Nemanja Vidaković	1	0	0	0	1	0
11	(Sierra Leone)	DF	Sheriff Suma	4	1	0	0	4	1
12	(Azerbaijan)	GK	Davud Karimi	2	0	0	0	2	0
15	(Azerbaijan)	MF	Tural Jalilov	1	0	0	0	1	0
16	(Azerbaijan)	DF	Farrukh Rahimov	1	0	0	0	1	0
17	(Azerbaijan)	MF	Ramazan Abbasov	2	0	0	0	2	0
18	(Sierra Leone)	MF	Samuel Barlay	4	1	0	0	4	1
20	(Argentina)	MF	Cristian Torres	4	0	0	0	4	0
22	(Azerbaijan)	FW	Amid Huseynov	1	0	0	0	1	0
24	(Azerbaijan)	DF	Huseyn Iskanderov	4	0	0	0	4	0
30	(Russia)	MF	Sharapudin Shalbuzov	3	0	0	0	3	0
61	(Russia)	GK	Ivan Vasiliev	3	1	0	0	3	1
87	(Georgia (country))	MF	George Gulordava	4	0	0	0	4	0
90	(Russia)	MF	Sergey Chernyshev	1	0	0	0	1	0
			TOTALS	77	6	0	0	77	6
