= 2010–11 Gabala FC season =

Gabala
2010–11 season
- Chairman: Taleh Heydərov
- Manager: Tony Adams
- Stadium: Gabala City Stadium
- Premier League: 7th
- Azerbaijan Cup: Quarter final vs FK Baku
- Top goalscorer: League: Deon Burton (9); All: Deon Burton (9)
- Highest home attendance: 2,500 vs Khazar Lankaran; 6 November 2010; Baku; 23 December 2010
- Lowest home attendance: 300 vs Neftchi ISM; 8 December 2010; FK Ganja; 1 April 2011; MOIK Baku; 24 April 2011
- Average home league attendance: League: 1,281; All: 1,172
Home colours	Away colours

The Gabala FC 2010–11 season was Gabala's fifth Azerbaijan Premier League season, which they finished in 7th position. They were knocked out of the Azerbaijan Cup by Baku at the Quarter Finals stage. It was their first season Tony Adams as their manager.

== Squad ==
As of match played 18 May 2011

No.	Name	Nationality	Position	Date of birth (age)	Signed from	Signed in	Contract ends	Apps.	Goals
Goalkeepers
1	Elnar Karimov	(Azerbaijan)	GK	5 April 1985 (aged 26)	Khazar Lankaran	2006		18	0
12	Pāvels Doroševs	(Latvia)	GK	9 October 1980 (aged 30)	Skonto Riga	2009		72	0
30	Anar Nazirov	(Azerbaijan)	GK	8 September 1985 (aged 25)	Standard Sumgayit	2010		5	0
Defenders
2	Velichko Velichkov	(Bulgaria)	DF	24 November 1986 (aged 24)	OFC Sliven 2000	2010			
3	Nodar Mammadov (Note: Nodar Mammadov was born in Kaspi, Georgian SSR, but qualified to represent Azerbaijan, representing them at senior level between 2007 and 2008.)	(Azerbaijan)	DF	3 June 1988 (aged 22)	Qarabağ	2010		30	3
4	Ramin Guliyev	(Azerbaijan)	DF	22 June 1981 (aged 29)	Standard Sumgayit	2010		8	0
5	Sergei Sokolov (Note: Sergei Sokolov was born in Stavropol, Russian SFSR, but qualified to represent Azerbaijan, representing them at senior level in 2006.)	(Azerbaijan)	DF	12 March 1977 (aged 34)	Simurq	2010			
6	Ljubo Baranin	(Serbia)	DF	25 August 1986 (aged 24)	Bežanija	2009			
14	Milan Antić	(Serbia)	DF	1 July 1981 (aged 29)	Jedinstvo Bijelo Polje	2009			
15	Răzvan Țârlea	(Romania)	DF	5 August 1979 (aged 31)	Petrolul Ploiești	2009			
33	Sasha Yunisoglu (Note: Sasha Yunisoglu was born in Mykolaiv, Ukrainian SSR, but qualified to represent Azerbaijan, representing them at senior level between 2007 and 2011.)	(Azerbaijan)	DF	18 December 1985 (aged 25)	Baku	2010		28	3
34	Steve Olfers	(Netherlands)	DF	25 February 1982 (aged 29)	PSV Eindhoven	2010		28	0
Midfielders
7	Yashar Abuzarov	(Azerbaijan)	MF	9 September 1977 (aged 33)	Olimpik Baku	2009			
8	Bruno Barbosa	(Brazil)	MF	15 February 1988 (aged 23)	São Paulo	2010		20	1
9	Bruno Anjos	(Brazil)	MF	18 December 1991 (aged 19)	on loan from São Paulo	2010		17	1
11	Terry Cooke	(England)	MF	5 August 1976 (aged 34)	North Queensland Fury	2010		12	1
16	Kader Camara	(Guinea)	MF	16 August 1977 (aged 33)	Olimpik-Shuvalan	2010			
17	Arif İsayev	(Azerbaijan)	MF	28 July 1985 (aged 25)	Standard Sumgayit	2010		28	2
18	Goga Beraia (Note: Goga Beraia was born in the Georgian SSR, but qualified to represent Azerbaijan, representing them at U21 level in 2006.) (captain)	(Azerbaijan)	MF	26 January 1984 (aged 27)	Qarabağ	2008			
20	Cristian Torres (Note: Cristian Torres was born in Vicente López, Argentina, but qualified to represent Latvia after gaining citizenship, making his international debut for Latvia in September 2016.)	(Argentina)	MF	18 June 1985 (aged 25)	Jūrmala-VV	2009			
21	Al Bangura	(Sierra Leone)	MF	24 January 1988 (aged 23)	Forest Green Rovers	2011		5	0
24	Tarzin Cahangirov	(Azerbaijan)	MF	17 January 1992 (aged 19)	Academy	2010		6	0
25	Nuran Qurbanov	(Azerbaijan)	MF	10 August 1993 (aged 17)	MOIK Baku	2011		5	0
26	Namig Aliev	(Azerbaijan)	MF	29 September 1990 (aged 20)		2009			
28	Mushfig Teymurov	(Azerbaijan)	MF	15 January 1993 (aged 18)	Karvan	2009			
Forwards
10	Deon Burton (Note: Deon Burton was born in Reading, England, but qualified to represent Jamaica, representing them at senior level between 1997 and 2009.)	(Jamaica)	FW	25 October 1976 (aged 33)	Charlton Athletic	2010	2012	31	9
11	Collins John (Note: Collins John was born in Zwedru, Liberia, but qualified to represent Netherlands, representing them at senior level in 2004.)	(Netherlands)	FW	17 October 1985 (aged 24)	Chicago Fire	2011		3	0
19	Branimir Subašić (Note: Branimir Subašić was born in Belgrade, SR Serbia, but qualified to represent Azerbaijan, representing them at senior level between 2007 and 2013.)	(Azerbaijan)	FW	7 April 1982 (aged 29)	Red Star Belgrade	2010		21	2
22	Murad Hüseynov (Note: Murad Hüseynov was born in Makhachkala, Russian SFSR, but qualified to represent Azerbaijan, representing them at senior level in 2011.)	(Azerbaijan)	FW	25 January 1989 (aged 22)	Mladost Lučani	2011		12	3
Left during the season
19	Julio Cézar	(Brazil)	FW	28 June 1990 (aged 20)	on loan from São Paulo	2010		0	0
21	Asaf Qadiri	(Azerbaijan)	MF	17 August 1984 (aged 26)	Turan Tovuz	2010		1	0
25	Rahman Musayev	(Azerbaijan)	FW	14 December 1986 (aged 24)	Turan Tovuz	2010		5	0

== Transfers ==
=== In ===
Date	Position	Nationality	Name	From	Fee	Ref.
Summer 2010	GK	(Azerbaijan)	Anar Nazirov	Standard Sumgayit	Undisclosed	
Summer 2010	DF	(Azerbaijan)	Ramin Guliyev	Standard Sumgayit	Undisclosed	
Summer 2010	DF	(Azerbaijan)	Nodar Mammadov	Qarabağ	Undisclosed	
Summer 2010	DF	(Azerbaijan)	Sasha Yunisoglu	Baku	Undisclosed	
Summer 2010	MF	(Azerbaijan)	Asaf Gadiri	Turan Tovuz	Undisclosed	
Summer 2010	MF	(Azerbaijan)	Arif İsayev	Standard Sumgayit	Undisclosed	
Summer 2010	MF	(Brazil)	Bruno Silva	São Paulo	Undisclosed	
Summer 2010	MF	(England)	Terry Cooke	Unattached	Free	
Summer 2010	FW	(Azerbaijan)	Murad Hüseynov	Mladost Lučani	Undisclosed	
Summer 2010	FW	(Azerbaijan)	Branimir Subašić	Red Star Belgrade	Undisclosed	
Summer 2010	FW	(Brazil)	Julio Cézar	Noroeste	Undisclosed	
July 2010	FW	(Jamaica)	Deon Burton	Charlton Athletic	Undisclosed	
August 2010	DF	(Netherlands)	Steve Olfers	PSV Eindhoven	Undisclosed	
Winter 2011	MF	(Azerbaijan)	Nuran Gurbanov	MOIK Baku	Undisclosed	
Winter 2011	MF	(Sierra Leone)	Al Bangura	Unattached	Free	
January 2011	FW	(Netherlands)	Collins John	Unattached	Free	

=== Loans in ===
Date from	Position	Nationality	Name	From	Date to	Ref.
Summer 2010	MF	(Brazil)	Bruno Anjos	São Paulo	Summer 2011	

=== Out ===
Date	Position	Nationality	Name	To	Fee	Ref.
Winter 2011	FW	(Brazil)	Julio Cézar	Red Bull Brasil	Undisclosed	

=== Released ===
Date	Position	Nationality	Name	Joined	Date	Ref.
Winter 2011	MF	(Azerbaijan)	Parvin Pashayev	Mughan		
Winter 2011	MF	(Azerbaijan)	Rahman Musayev	Qaradağ		
31 May 2011	DF	(Azerbaijan)	Ramin Guliyev	Retired		
31 May 2011	MF	(England)	Terry Cooke	Retired		
31 May 2011	FW	(Sierra Leone)	Al Bangura	Forest Green Rovers	1 July 2011	

=== Trial ===
Date From	Date To	Position	Nationality	Name	Last club	Ref.
Summer 2010	Summer 2010	FW	(Ghana)	Samad Oppong		

== Competitions ==
=== Overview ===
Competition	First match	Last match	Starting round	Final position	Record							
Competition	First match	Last match	Starting round	Final position	Pld	W	D	L	GF	GA	GD	Win %
Premier League	7 August 2010	18 May 2011	Matchday 1	7th	32	13	12	7	31	18	+13	40.63
Azerbaijan Cup	8 December 2010	8 March 2011	Quarter Final	Last 16	3	1	1	1	2	1	+1	33.33
Total					35	14	13	8	33	19	+14	40.00

Last updated: 18 May 2011
Source: Competitions

=== Premier League ===
==== First Round ====
===== Results =====
7 August 2010 1	Khazar	1 - 0	Gabala	Lankaran
20:00 AZST (UTC+5)	Beqiri 75'	Report; Summary		Stadium: Lankaran City Stadium; Attendance: 9,000; Referee: Vusal Aliyev

15 August 2010 2	Gabala	0 - 2	Neftchi Baku	Qabala
18:00 AZST (UTC+5)		Report; Summary	Abdullayev 69'; Nasimov 75'	Stadium: Gabala City Stadium; Attendance: 2,000; Referee: Anar Salmanov

22 August 2010 3	Baku	2 - 1	Gabala	Baku
20:00 AZST (UTC+5)	Ramim 29'; Jabá 75' (pen.)	Report; Summary	Burton 6'; Antić (yellow card) 87' (red card) 89'; Baranin (red card) 90+2'	Stadium: Tofik Bakhramov Stadium; Attendance: 150; Referee: Vusal Aliyev

29 August 2010 4	Gabala	0 - 0	MOIK Baku	Qabala
17:30 AZST (UTC+5)		Report; Summary		Stadium: Gabala City Stadium; Attendance: 2,000; Referee: Afgan Hamzayev

11 September 2010 5	Turan Tovuz	0 - 1	Gabala	Tovuz
17:00 AZST (UTC+5)		Report; Summary	Yunisoğlu 60'	Stadium: Tovuz City Stadium; Attendance: 3,000; Referee: Elchin Mammadov

19 September 2010 6	Gabala	0 - 1	Inter Baku	Qabala
17:00 AZST (UTC+5)		Report; Summary	Amiraslanov 35'	Stadium: Gabala City Stadium; Attendance: 1,200; Referee: Elnur Muradov

25 September 2010 7	Gabala	2 - 1	Qarabağ	Qabala
17:00 AZST (UTC+5)	Burton 57'; Subašić 72'	Report; Summary	Imamaliyev 83'	Stadium: Gabala City Stadium; Attendance: 1500; Referee: Afgan Hamzayev

1 October 2010 8	Simurq	0 - 2	Gabala	Zaqatala
16:00 AZST (UTC+5)		Report; Summary	Yunisoğlu 14'; Cooke 85'	Stadium: Zaqatala City Stadium; Attendance: 700; Referee: Jeyhun Hashimov

16 October 2010 9	Gabala	2 - 0	FK Mughan	Qabala
15:00 AZST (UTC+5)	Subašić 5'; Burton 34'	Report; Summary		Stadium: Gabala City Stadium; Attendance: 2000; Referee: Elchin Mammadov

23 October 2010 10	Gabala	0 - 0	AZAL	Qabala
15:00 AZST (UTC+5)		Report; Summary		Stadium: Gabala City Stadium; Attendance: 800; Referee: Jeyhun Hashimov

31 October 2010 11	FK Ganja	0 - 0	Gabala	Ganja
14:00 AZT (UTC+4)		Report; Summary		Stadium: Ganja City Stadium; Attendance: 7,000; Referee: Vusal Aliyev

6 November 2010 12	Gabala	1 - 0	Khazar Lankaran	Qabala
14:00 AZT (UTC+4)	Baranin 35'	Report; Summary		Stadium: Gabala City Stadium; Attendance: 2,500; Referee: Fariz Yusifov

13 November 2010 13	Inter Baku	0 - 0	Gabala	Baku
18:00 AZT (UTC+4)		Report; Summary		Stadium: Shafa Stadium; Attendance: 500; Referee: Elchin Mammadov

21 November 2010 14	Neftchi Baku	0 - 0	Gabala	Baku
16:00 AZT (UTC+4)		Report; Summary		Stadium: Tofik Bakhramov Stadium; Attendance: 1,000; Referee: Fariz Yusifov

27 November 2010 15	Gabala	4 - 0	Simurq	Qabala
14:00 AZT (UTC+4)	Burton 30' (pen.), 61' (pen.); Torres 55'; İsayev 90'	Report; Summary		Stadium: Gabala City Stadium; Attendance: 1,500; Referee: Anar Salmanov

4 December 2010 16	MOIK Baku	0 - 3	Gabala	Baku
14:00 AZT (UTC+4)		Report; Summary	Burton 41', 89' (pen.); Bruno 44'	Stadium: MOIK Stadium; Attendance: 200; Referee: Afgan Hamzayev

11 December 2010 17	Gabala	1 - 0	Turan Tovuz	Qabala
14:00 AZT (UTC+4)	Mammadov 33'	Report; Summary		Stadium: Gabala City Stadium; Attendance: 2,000; Referee: Elchin Mammadov

19 December 2010 18	AZAL	2 - 2	Gabala	Baku
14:00 AZT (UTC+4)	Juška 45'; Petrov 90'	Report; Summary	İsayev 3'; Antić 19'	Stadium: Shafa Stadium; Attendance: 1,000; Referee: Rovshan Ahmadov

23 December 2010 19	Gabala	0 - 1	Baku	Qabala
13:00 AZT (UTC+4)		Report; Summary	Jabá 50'	Stadium: Gabala City Stadium; Attendance: 2,500; Referee: Elchin Mammadov

12 February 2011 20	Qarabağ	3 - 0	Gabala	Baku^{1}
14:00 AZT (UTC+4)	Aliyev 14'; Adamia 63'; Ismayilov 73'	Report; Summary		Stadium: Tofiq Bahramov Stadium; Attendance: 1500; Referee: Elchin Mammadov

20 February 2011 21	FK Mughan	1 - 0	Gabala	Salyany
15:00 AZT (UTC+4)	Mammadov 46'; Novruzov (yellow card) 4' (yellow-red card) 58'	Report; Summary		Stadium: Salyany Olympic Stadium; Attendance: 500; Referee: Afgan Hamzayev

27 February 2011 22	Gabala	0 - 0	FK Ganja	Qabala
14:00 AZT (UTC+4)		Report; Summary	Huseynov (red card) 41'	Stadium: Gabala City Stadium; Attendance: 600; Referee: Ramil Diniyev

===== League table =====
Pos	Team	Pld	W	D	L	GF	GA	GD	Pts	Qualification
5	AZAL	22	9	9	4	27	16	+11	36	Qualification for championship group
6	Baku	22	9	6	7	28	21	+7	33	Qualification for championship group
7	Gabala	22	8	7	7	19	14	+5	31	Qualification for relegation group
8	Mughan	22	7	6	9	14	23	−9	27	Qualification for relegation group
9	Ganja	22	5	9	8	23	27	−4	24	Qualification for relegation group

Source: Soccerway.com
Rules for classification: 1) points; 2) goal difference; 3) number of goals scored.

==== Relegation Group ====
===== Results =====
13 March 2011 23	MOIK Baku	1 - 1	Gabala	Baku
14:00 AZT (UTC+4)	Jafarguliyev 56'	Report; Summary	Burton 52'	Stadium: MOIK Stadium; Attendance: 150; Referee: Aliyar Aghayev

17 March 2011 24	FK Mughan	1 - 2	Gabala FC	Salyany
14:00 AZT (UTC+4)	Souza 15'	Report; Summary	Antić 20'; Hüseynov 80'; Mammadov (red card) 84'	Stadium: Salyany Olimpic Stadium; Attendance: 500; Referee: Elvin Askerov

1 April 2011 25	Gabala	1 - 1	FK Ganja	Qabala
15:00 AZST (UTC+5)	Hüseynov 26'	Report; Summary	Soares 56'	Stadium: Gabala City Stadium; Attendance: 300; Referee: Rahim Hasanov

9 April 2011 26	Turan Tovuz	0 - 2	Gabala	Tovuz
15:00 AZST (UTC+5)		Report; Summary	Yunisoğlu 61'; Burton 85'	Stadium: Tovuz City Stadium; Attendance: 2,000; Referee: Jeyhun Hashimov

17 April 2011 27	Gabala	3 - 0	Simurq	Qabala
15:00 AZST (UTC+5)	Antić 34'; Baranin 55'; Torres 88'	Report; Summary		Stadium: Gabala City Stadium; Attendance: 500; Referee: Vusal Aliyev

24 April 2011 28	Gabala	0 - 0	MOIK Baku	Qabala
16:00 AZST (UTC+5)		Report; Summary		Stadium: Gabala City Stadium; Attendance: 300; Referee: Fuad Hasanov

29 April 2011 29	Simurq	0 - 0	Gabala	Zaqatala
16:00 AZST (UTC+5)		Report; Summary		Stadium: Zaqatala City Stadium; Attendance: 300; Referee: Jeyhun Hashimov

7 May 2011 30	Gabala	1 - 0	Turan Tovuz	Qabala
16:00 AZST (UTC+5)	Abuzerov 15'	Report; Summary		Stadium: Gabala City Stadium; Attendance: 400; Referee: Rauf Jabbarov

11 May 2011 31	FK Ganja	0 - 0	Gabala	Ganja
16:00 AZST (UTC+5)		Summary	Dorosevs (red card) 31'	Stadium: Shehar Stadium; Attendance: 1,500; Referee: Elnur Muradov

18 May 2011 32	Gabala	2 - 1	FK Mughan	Qabala
16:00 AZST (UTC+5)	Hüseynov 16'; Abuzerov 87'	Summary	Pelu 38'	Stadium: Gabala City Stadium; Attendance: 400; Referee: Elchin Mammadov

===== League table =====
Pos	Team	Pld	W	D	L	GF	GA	GD	Pts	Relegation
7	Gabala	32	13	12	7	31	18	+13	51	
8	Mughan	32	13	8	11	29	31	−2	47	
9	Ganja	32	8	12	12	33	37	−4	36	
10	Turan	32	7	6	19	24	47	−23	27	
11	Simurq (R)	32	4	7	21	20	52	−32	19	Relegation to Azerbaijan First Division
12	MOIK Baku (R)	32	4	6	22	14	55	−41	18	Relegation to Azerbaijan First Division

Source: Soccerway.com
Rules for classification: 1) points; 2) goal difference; 3) number of goals scored.
(R) Relegated

=== Azerbaijan Cup ===
8 December 2010 Last 16	Gabala	2 - 0	Neftchi ISM	Qabala
13:00 AZT (UTC+4)	Baranin 38'; Bruno Anjos 67'	Summary		Stadium: Gabala City Stadium; Attendance: 300; Referee: Aliyar Aghayev

3 March 2011 Quarter Finals 1st Leg	Gabala	0 - 0	Baku	Qabala
14:00 AZT (UTC+4)		Summary		Stadium: Gabala City Stadium; Attendance: 500; Referee: Rovshan Ahmadov

8 March 2011 Quarter Finals 2nd Leg	Baku	1 - 0	Gabala	Baku
16:00 AZT (UTC+4)	Jabá 57'	Summary		Stadium: Tofik Bakhramov Stadium; Attendance: 500; Referee: Elchin Mammadov

== Squad statistics ==
=== Appearances and goals ===
No.	Pos	Nat	Player	Total		Premier League		Azerbaijan Cup	
No.	Pos	Nat	Player	Apps	Goals	Apps	Goals	Apps	Goals
1	GK	(Azerbaijan) AZE	Elnar Karimov	1	0	0+1	0	0+0	0
3	DF	(Azerbaijan) AZE	Nodar Mammadov	30	3	27+0	3	2+1	0
4	DF	(Azerbaijan) AZE	Ramin Guliyev	8	0	1+4	0	2+1	0
5	DF	(Azerbaijan) AZE	Sergey Sokolov	7	0	6+0	0	1+0	0
6	DF	(Serbia) SRB	Ljubo Baranin	30	3	27+0	2	3+0	1
7	MF	(Azerbaijan) AZE	Yashar Abuzerov	15	2	10+4	2	1+0	0
8	MF	(Brazil) BRA	Bruno Barbosa	20	1	16+1	1	3+0	0
9	MF	(Brazil) BRA	Bruno Anjos	17	1	11+4	0	1+1	1
10	FW	(Jamaica) JAM	Deon Burton	31	9	28+0	9	3+0	0
11	FW	(Netherlands) NED	Collins John	3	0	3+0	0	0+0	0
12	GK	(Latvia) LAT	Pāvels Doroševs	30	0	27+0	0	3+0	0
14	DF	(Serbia) SRB	Milan Antić	27	3	24+1	3	2+0	0
15	DF	(Romania) ROU	Răzvan Ţârlea	24	0	16+5	0	3+0	0
16	MF	(Guinea) GUI	Abdoul Kader Camara	25	0	19+6	0	0+0	0
17	MF	(Azerbaijan) AZE	Arif İsayev	28	2	12+13	2	1+2	0
18	MF	(Azerbaijan) AZE	Goga Beraia	20	0	14+3	0	2+1	0
19	FW	(Azerbaijan) AZE	Branimir Subašić	21	2	16+3	2	2+0	0
20	MF	(Argentina) ARG	Cristian Torres	25	2	16+8	2	1+0	0
21	MF	(Sierra Leone) SLE	Al Bangura	5	0	4+1	0	0+0	0
22	FW	(Azerbaijan) AZE	Murad Hüseynov	12	3	9+1	3	2+0	0
24	MF	(Azerbaijan) AZE	Tarzin Jahangirov	6	0	0+6	0	0+0	0
25	MF	(Azerbaijan) AZE	Nuran Gurbanov	5	0	2+3	0	0+0	0
26	MF	(Azerbaijan) AZE	Namig Aliyev	5	0	2+3	0	0+0	0
29	FW	(Azerbaijan) AZE	Amil Yunanov	1	0	0+1	0	0+0	0
30	GK	(Azerbaijan) AZE	Anar Nazirov	5	0	5+0	0	0+0	0
33	DF	(Azerbaijan) AZE	Saşa Yunisoğlu	28	3	27+0	3	1+0	0
34	DF	(Netherlands) NED	Steve Olfers	28	0	25+0	0	3+0	0
40	MF	(Azerbaijan) AZE	Farid Hagverdiyev	2	0	0+2	0	0+0	0
Players who appeared for Gabala who left during the season:
11	MF	(England) ENG	Terry Cooke	12	1	4+8	1	0+0	0
21	MF	(Azerbaijan) AZE	Asaf Gadiri	1	0	0+1	0	0+0	0
25	FW	(Azerbaijan) AZE	Rahman Musayev	5	0	2+3	0	0+0	0

=== Goal scorers ===
Place	Position	Nation	Number	Name	Premier League	Azerbaijan Cup	Total
1	FW	(Jamaica)	10	Deon Burton	9	0	9
2	DF	(Azerbaijan)	33	Saşa Yunisoğlu	3	0	3
2	MF	(Serbia)	14	Milan Antić	3	0	3
2	FW	(Azerbaijan)	22	Murad Hüseynov	3	0	3
2	DF	(Serbia)	6	Ljuba Baranin	2	1	3
6	FW	(Serbia)	19	Branimir Subašić	2	0	2
6	MF	(Azerbaijan)	21	Arif İsayev	2	0	2
6	MF	(Argentina)	20	Cristian Torres	2	0	2
6	MF	(Azerbaijan)	7	Yashar Abuzerov	2	0	2
10	MF	(England)	11	Terry Cooke	1	0	1
10	MF	(Brazil)	8	Bruno Barbosa	1	0	1
10	DF	(Azerbaijan)	3	Nodar Mammadov	1	0	1
10	MF	(Brazil)	9	Bruno Anjos	0	1	1
				TOTALS	31	2	33

=== Disciplinary record ===
Number	Nation	Position	Name	Premier League		Azerbaijan Cup		Total	
Number	Nation	Position	Name	Yellow card	Red card	Yellow card	Red card	Yellow card	Red card
1	(Azerbaijan)	GK	Elnar Kerimov	1	0	0	0	1	0
3	(Azerbaijan)	DF	Nodar Mammadov	3	1	0	0	3	1
4	(Azerbaijan)	MF	Ramin Guliyev	1	0	0	0	1	0
5	(Azerbaijan)	MF	Sergey Sokolov	1	0	0	0	1	0
6	(Serbia)	DF	Ljubo Baranin	4	1	0	0	4	1
7	(Azerbaijan)	MF	Yashar Abuzerov	5	0	0	0	5	0
8	(Azerbaijan)	MF	Bruno Barbosa	1	0	0	0	1	0
9	(Azerbaijan)	MF	Bruno Anjos	1	0	0	0	1	0
10	(Jamaica)	FW	Deon Burton	5	1	0	0	5	1
11	(England)	MF	Terry Cooke	1	0	0	0	1	0
12	(Latvia)	GK	Pāvels Doroševs	3	1	0	0	3	1
14	(Serbia)	DF	Milan Antić	3	1	0	0	3	1
15	(Romania)	DF	Răzvan Ţârlea	5	0	0	0	5	0
16	(Guinea)	MF	Abdoul Kader Camara	9	0	0	0	9	0
17	(Azerbaijan)	MF	Arif İsayev	3	0	0	0	3	0
18	(Azerbaijan)	MF	Goga Beraia	8	0	0	0	8	0
20	(Azerbaijan)	MF	Cristian Torres	1	0	0	0	1	0
21	(Sierra Leone)	MF	Al Bangura	2	0	0	0	2	0
22	(Azerbaijan)	MF	Murad Hüseynov	2	0	0	0	2	0
26	(Azerbaijan)	MF	Namig Aliyev	1	0	0	0	1	0
33	(Azerbaijan)	DF	Saşa Yunisoğlu	6	0	0	0	6	0
34	(Netherlands)	DF	Steve Olfers	4	0	0	0	4	0
			TOTALS	70	5	0	0	70	5
