= Al Bangura =

Sierra Leonean footballer

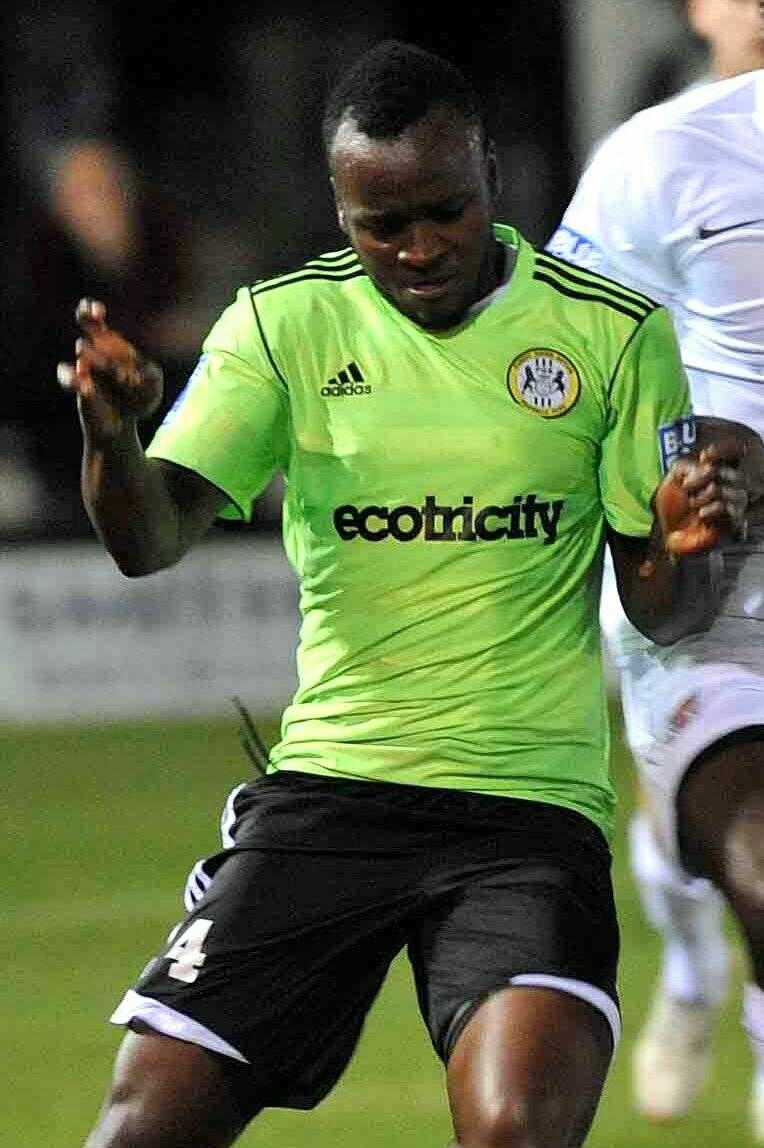
- Bangura with Forest Green Rovers in 2012

Personal information
- Full name: Alhassan Bangura
- Date of birth: 24 January 1988 (age 38)
- Place of birth: Freetown, Sierra Leone
- Height: 5 ft 8 in (1.73 m)
- Position: Midfielder

Youth career
- 2004–2005: Watford

Senior career*
Years	Team	Apps	(Gls)
2005–2009	Watford	62	(1)
2008-2009	→ Brighton & Hove Albion (loan)	6	(0)
2009–2010	Blackpool	9	(0)
2010–2011	Mersin İdmanyurdu	6	(0)
2011	Gabala	5	(0)
2011–2014	Forest Green Rovers	83	(0)
2014–2015	Coventry City	0	(0)
2015–2016	St Albans City	5	(0)
2016–2017	Nuneaton Town	3	(0)
Total		179	(1)

International career
2008–2014	Sierra Leone	3	(0)
- * Club domestic league appearances and goals

Alhassan "Al" Bangura (born 24 January 1988) is a Sierra Leonean former professional footballer who played as a midfielder.

Bangura played for the Sierra Leone national team and is notable for having been the victim of human trafficking when he was a teenager and also the subject of a deportation case in the United Kingdom in 2007.

== Early life ==
Bangura was born and brought up in Freetown, Sierra Leone, and his father was the head of the Poro Secret Society, however he died when Alhassan was a young child. As he was the oldest in his family, custom dictated that he took over his father's place in Poro, when he grew up. He refused to do so, and instead fled to Guinea aged just 15 years-old, saying later, "I didn't like it at all so I fled to Guinea". However, in Guinea he met a Frenchman, who he did not realise was involved in human trafficking and who took Bangura to France intending to make him a male prostitute. When the man took Bangura to the UK, he intended again to use him as a prostitute, however Bangura sought asylum.

"I come from a strange background and from a country where there is not that much opportunity to get into the game of football professionally. It was hard when I was back home because no-one is there for you, no-one is encouraging you.... I also had problems away from football that made it hard."

— Bangura on his early life in Sierra Leone.

== Playing career ==
=== Club ===
Discovered by a Watford scout playing for Chertsey Town Youth in 2004, Bangura joined the Hornets youth set-up, and made his debut in a 1–0 win over Stoke City at the Britannia Stadium in April 2005, coming on for the injured Gavin Mahon after 30 minutes. Bangura started the following game against West Ham United, on the final day of the 2004–05 season. In the 2005–06 season he was a regular in the Watford side, making 40 appearances in all competitions. His first goal for the Hornets, was a 90th-minute equaliser in a 2–2 draw against Derby County at Vicarage Road in March 2006. At the end of the season he won the club's Young Player of the year award.

At the end of the 2005–06 Championship season Watford were promoted to the Premier League and Bangura was rewarded with a contract extension taking him through to the end of the 2008–09 season. The 2006–07 season saw Bangura make his Premier League debut as a 75th-minute substitute in a 1–2 home defeat to Manchester United. He made a total of 20 appearances, 16 of which were in the Premier League as Watford finished bottom of the table in 20th place and were relegated back to the Championship.

He signed a new three-year contract with Watford in May 2007, but only made 10 appearances in the 2007–08 season. In the following season he made five appearances, before going out on loan for the remainder of the season to League One side Brighton & Hove Albion in March 2009. He made his debut for the Seagulls four days after signing in a 2–1 defeat to Leyton Orient at Brisbane Road. He made a total of six appearances for Brighton.

At the end of the season he returned to Watford, but left the club by mutual consent. He was subsequently signed in August by Blackpool on a non-contract basis, and later the same day was an unused substitute in a 0–0 home draw with Derby County.

He made his debut in August, in the Seasiders' 4–1 victory over Premier League side Wigan Athletic in the second round of the 2009–10 Football League Cup. His league debut came two days later when he was an 80th-minute substitute in a 3–0 home win over Coventry City. In September 2009 he signed a one-year contract with an option for a further year with the Seasiders. After three substitute appearances his first league start came in a 3–0 win at home over Sheffield United in October. He was released at the end of the season.

In 2011, he signed for Tony Adams' Gabala in Azerbaijan.

On 1 July 2011, Bangura signed for Forest Green Rovers on a two-year contract, linking up with his former youth coach at Watford, Dave Hockaday, who was then manager at Forest Green. He picked up a knee injury later in the month whilst training and was required to undergo surgery which led to him missing the start of Rovers season.

Bangura made his return from injury by featuring in a reserve team game against Brighton & Hove Albion in September 2011 and made his first team debut in a 3–2 home loss against Southport on 17 September 2011. Bangura then suffered another knee injury which led to him having a second operation in just four months to correct it.

On 6 December 2012, Bangura extended his contract with Forest Green for a further two years, keeping him at the club until June 2015. However, in August 2014, he agreed to terminate his contract a year early and left the club.

Following the appointment of former Forest Green Rovers manager Dave Hockaday as under-21 manager at Coventry City, Al Bangura joined the League One side on a trial basis in February 2015. Bangura impressed new Sky Blues boss Tony Mowbray to the extent that he was rewarded with a short-term deal to join the club until the end of the season.

Bangura took time away from football after leaving Coventry City, however he returned to playing in January 2016. During his time away, he worked with the Premier League to raise awareness of the growing number of teenage players being tricked into leaving Africa for Europe. In January 2016, Bangura signed for National League South side St Albans City. A year later, Bangura joined National League North club Nuneaton Town. Following his spell with the club, Bangura settled in the area but left football, instead going onto work at a care home.

=== International ===
Bangura was called up to the Sierra Leone squad by national manager Ahmed Kanu in October 2008. However, it was also revealed that he would not be able to play home matches in Sierra Leone, as he has said he feared his life would be in danger in the country he was forced to flee.

He made his Leone Stars debut on 11 October in a 2010 FIFA World Cup and 2010 African Cup of Nations qualifier 4–1 defeat to Nigeria at the Abuja Stadium, Abuja, Nigeria. On 2 November 2009 he was called up for a friendly against Dutch Eredivisie side Willem II on 14 November, in aid of the Ibrahim Kargbo Foundation. Bangura played in the game which ended 1–1.

== Personal life ==
In September 2009 he moved from Watford to live on the Fylde Coast.

=== Asylum case ===
In early 2007 Bangura was cleared to stay in the UK. However, the Home Office lodged an appeal on a legal technicality, claiming his status as an asylum seeker changed when he turned 18 years old. In November 2007, Bangura appeared before an Asylum and Immigration Tribunal, with Watford manager Aidy Boothroyd speaking on his behalf.

On 11 December 2007 he lost his case to stay in the UK, despite Bangura fearing a return to his homeland, where he could be under threat from the Soko tribe, formerly led by his father. He launched an immediate appeal against the decision.

The appeal against the decision, was backed by FIFPro, the worldwide representative organisation for professional footballers, Watford MP Claire Ward, Watford manager Aidy Boothroyd, former Home Secretary David Blunkett, and the club's honorary Life President Elton John.

On 15 December 2007, Watford fans staged a half-time protest during the club's game against Plymouth Argyle, holding up posters on which Bangura's face appeared under the words "He's family", with Argyle fans in the 18,000 crowd joining in the protest.

"The support that I got from the Watford people is something I will never forget. They did so much for me, they are like family."

— Bangura in September 2009 talking about Watford and the club's supporters.

Four days later the Home Office announced that Bangura would be allowed to remain in the UK while he applied for a work permit, a process that would take place in parallel with his appeal against deportation back to Sierra Leone.

Bangura won his appeal to stay in the UK after being awarded a work permit by a six-strong Government panel on 14 January 2008. At a Press Conference the following day Bangura said, "It's not the end of my career if I went back, It's the end of my life. It's going to make a big difference to my life. And, of course, I can concentrate more on my football now.".

== Career statistics ==
=== Club ===
Appearances and goals by club, season and competition
Club	Season	League			National Cup		League Cup		Other		Total	
Club	Season	Division	Apps	Goals	Apps	Goals	Apps	Goals	Apps	Goals	Apps	Goals
Watford	2004–05	Championship	2	0	0	0	0	0	—		2	0
Watford	2005–06	Championship	35	1	0	0	3	0	3 (Note: Appearance(s) in Championship play-offs)	0	41	1
Watford	2006–07	Premier League	16	0	2	0	2	0	—		20	0
Watford	2007–08	Championship	7	0	1	0	2	0	0	0	10	0
Watford	2008–09	Championship	2	0	0	0	3	0	—		5	0
Watford	Total		62	1	3	0	10	0	3	0	78	1
Brighton & Hove Albion (loan)	2008–09	League One	6	0	0	0	0	0	0	0	6	0
Blackpool	2009–10	Championship	9	0	0	0	2	0	0	0	11	0
Mersin İdmanyurdu	2010–11	TFF First League	6	0	0	0	—		—		6	0
Gabala	2010–11	Azerbaijan Premier League	5	0	0	0	—		—		5	0
Forest Green Rovers	2011–12	Conference Premier	12	0	1	0	—		0	0	13	0
Forest Green Rovers	2012–13	Conference Premier	33	0	2	0	—		2 (Note: Appearance(s) in FA Trophy)	0	37	0
Forest Green Rovers	2013–14	Conference Premier	38	0	1	0	—		2	0	41	0
Forest Green Rovers	2014–15	Conference Premier	0	0	0	0	—		0	0	0	0
Forest Green Rovers	Total		83	0	4	0	—		4	0	91	0
Coventry City	2014–15	League One	0	0	0	0	0	0	0	0	0	0
St Albans City	2015–16	National League South	5	0	0	0	—		1 (Note: Appearance(s) in Herts Charity Cup)	0	6	0
Nuneaton Town	2016–17	National League North	3	0	0	0	—		0	0	3	0
Career total			179	1	7	0	12	0	8	0	206	1

=== International ===
Appearances and goals by national team and year
National team	Year	Apps	Goals
Sierra Leone
Sierra Leone	2008	1	0
Sierra Leone	2014	2	0
Total		3	0

== Honours ==
Watford

- Football League Championship play-offs: 2006

Individual

- Watford Young Player of the Season: 2005–06
