= Amit Guluzade =

Azerbaijani footballer (born 1992)

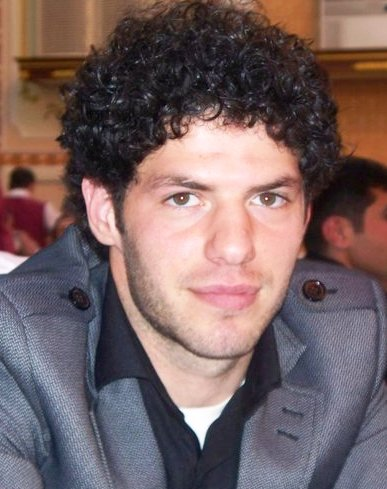

Personal information
- Full name: Amit Sevindik oglu Guluzade
- Date of birth: 20 November 1992 (age 34)
- Place of birth: Baku, Azerbaijan
- Height: 1.76 m (5 ft 9 1/2 in)
- Position: Midfielder

Youth career
- –2009: Neftçi

Senior career*
Years	Team	Apps	(Gls)
2009–2011	Neftçi	10	(0)
2011–2012	Kayseri Erciyesspor	21	(0)
2012	Ravan Baku	11	(0)
2013–2014	Gabala	21	(0)
2014–2015	Atlético CP	6	(0)
2015–2017	Sumgayit	35	(1)
2017	AEL	4	(0)
2017	Sabail	6	(0)
2018	Drita	5	(0)
2019	Čelik Zenica	1	(0)
2020–2021	Milsami Orhei	8	(0)
2022	Stadl-Paura	5	(0)

International career^{‡}
2007–2009	Azerbaijan U17	12	(0)
2009–2011	Azerbaijan U19	12	(0)
2011–2012	Azerbaijan U21	9	(1)
2010	Azerbaijan	3	(0)
- * Club domestic league appearances and goals as of 29 April 2022 ‡ National team caps and goals as of 17 September 2013

Amit Guluzade (Azerbaijani: Amit Quluzadə; born 20 November 1992) is an Azerbaijani football manager, pundit and former professional player, who currently works as the head coach of Qaradağ Lökbatan in Azerbaijan Second League.

== Club Career ==
Born in Baku, Guluzade played for Neftçi's youth team before joining the first team. He became the champion of Azerbaijan Premier League with Neftçi in the 2010-2011 season.

On 25 June 2011, Turkish side Kayseri Erciyesspor signed Guluzade to a two-year contract with the option of a third. As part of the transfer, Neftçi stipulated that if Guluzade did not play at least 50% of the club's matches in each year, he could return to Neftçi; and that Erciyesspor could sell Guluzade at any point, but only with Neftçi's approval.

After one season in Turkey, Guluzade joined Ravan Baku on 4 July 2012. Guluzade made his debut for Ravan Baku in the first game of the season in a 1–1 home draw with Khazar Lankaran on 5 August 2012.

On 9 January 2013, it was announced that Guluzade had signed for Gabala on an 18-month contract. Guluzade made his Gabala debut on 10 February 2013 in a 1–1 home draw against Qarabağ.

On 21 August 2014, Guluzade joined Atlético CP on a two-year contract.

On 3 August 2015, Guluzade moved back to Azerbaijan, signing for Sumgayit FK on a one-year contract.

On 11 January 2017, Guluzade signed a two-and-a-half-year contract with Greek Super League side AEL. On 4 May 2017, he left the team by mutual agreement after having played in only 4 league games.

On 25 June 2020, Guluzade signed for Moldovan side Milsami Orhei. Amit retired in 2022 after playing with Austrian side, Stadl-Paura.

== International Career ==
Guluzade appeared 12 times for both the U-17 and U-19's before making the jump to full Azerbaijan squad for some of the 2010 World Cup qualification matches. Guluzade international debut came on 29 May 2010 in a friendly match against Macedonia.

== Coaching Career ==
In 2023, Guluzade worked as the sports director of Füzuli FK. In September 2024, Guluzade was appointed as the head caoch of Qaradağ Lökbatan in Azerbaijan First League. Amit departed at the end of the season, after the team got the last place in the league and was relegated to Azerbaijan Second League.

Amit worked as a football pundit at SportInfo.az TV from fall of 2025 until summer of 2026. In August 2026, Amit Guluzade was appointed as the head coach of Qaradağ Lökbatan in Azerbaijan Second League.

== Career statistics ==
=== Club ===
As of matches played 29 April 2022

Appearances and goals by club, season and competition
Club	Season	League			Domestic Cup		League Cup		Continental		Other		Total	
Club	Season	Division	Apps	Goals	Apps	Goals	Apps	Goals	Apps	Goals	Apps	Goals	Apps	Goals
Neftçi	2009–10	Premyer Liqası	1	0	2	1	—						3	1
Neftçi	2010–11	Premyer Liqası	9	0	0	0	—						9	0
Neftçi	Total		10	0	2	1	—						12	1
Kayseri Erciyesspor	2011–12	TFF 1. Lig	21	0	1	0	—						22	0
Ravan Baku	2012–13	Premyer Liqası	11	0	0	0	—						11	0
Gabala	2012–13	Premyer Liqası	7	0	2	0	—						9	0
Gabala	2013–14	Premyer Liqası	14	0	1	0	—						15	0
Gabala	Total		21	0	3	0	—						24	0
Atlético CP	2014–15	Segunda Liga	6	0	1	0	1	0	—				8	0
Sumgayit	2015–16	Premyer Liqası	22	0	2	0	—						24	0
Sumgayit	2016–17	Premyer Liqası	13	1	3	0	—						16	1
Sumgayit	Total		35	1	5	0	—						40	1
AEL	2016–17	Super League Greece	4	0	0	0	—						4	0
Sabail	2017–18	Premyer Liqası	6	0	1	0	—						7	0
Drita	2017–18	Superliga e Kosovës	5	0	0	0	—						5	0
Čelik Zenica	2018–19	Premijer Liga	1	0	0	0	—						1	0
Milsami Orhei	2020–21	Divizia Națională	8	0	0	0	—						8	0
Stadl-Paura	2021–22	Regionalliga Central	5	0	0	0	—						5	0
Career total			131	1	13	1	1	0	—				145	2

=== International ===
Azerbaijan national team
Year	Apps	Goals
2010	3	0
Total	3	0

Statistics accurate as of match played 2 June 2010

== Honours ==
=== Club ===
Neftçi

- Premyer Liqası
  - Winner (1): 2010–11

Drita

- Superliga e Kosovës
  - Winner (1): 2017–18
