= Cristian Torres (footballer, born 1985) =

Latvian footballer

Personal information
- Full name: Cristian Damián Torres
- Date of birth: 18 June 1985 (age 41)
- Place of birth: Vicente López, Argentina
- Height: 1.69 m (5 ft 7 in)
- Position: Midfielder

Youth career
- Colegiales

Senior career*
Years	Team	Apps	(Gls)
2002–2004	Colegiales		
2004–2006	Jūrmala	61	(9)
2007	Liepājas Metalurgs	18	(2)
2008–2009	Jūrmala-VV	40	(5)
2009–2011	Gabala	52	(7)
2011–2012	Ravan Baku	45	(5)
2013	Qarabağ	6	(0)
2013	Ravan Baku	6	(0)
2014–2021	Liepāja	160	(6)

International career^{‡}
2016–2018	Latvia	7	(0)
- * Club domestic league appearances and goals as of 22 June 2023 ‡ National team caps and goals as of 22 June 2023

Cristian Damián Torres (Latvian: Kristians Damians Torress; born 18 June 1985) is a professional football player who last played for Liepāja. Born in Argentina, he played for the Latvia national team.

== Career ==
=== Club ===
During the summer of 2012, Torres moved from Gabala to Ravan Baku. 18-months later, Torres signed for Qarabağ for six-months before re-signing with Ravan Baku in the summer of 2013.

In March 2014, Torres signed for Liepāja.

== Career statistics ==
=== Club ===
As of match played 7 August 2021

Appearances and goals by club, season and competition
Club	Season	League			National Cup		Continental		Total	
Club	Season	Division	Apps	Goals	Apps	Goals	Apps	Goals	Apps	Goals
Gabala	2009–10	Azerbaijan Premier League	28	5			–		28	5
Gabala	2010–11	Azerbaijan Premier League	24	2	1	0	–		25	2
Gabala	Total		52	7	1	0	-	-	53	7
Ravan Baku	2011–12	Azerbaijan Premier League	28	4	1	0	–		29	4
Ravan Baku	2012–13	Azerbaijan Premier League	17	1	1	0	–		18	1
Ravan Baku	Total		45	5	2	0	-	-	47	5
Qarabağ	2012–13	Azerbaijan Premier League	6	0	2	0	–		8	0
Ravan Baku	2013–14	Azerbaijan Premier League	6	0	0	0	–		6	0
Liepāja	2014	Latvian Higher League	33	4	2	0	-		35	4
Liepāja	2015	Latvian Higher League	20	0	3	0	-		23	0
Liepāja	2016	Latvian Higher League	26	1	1	0	2	0	29	1
Liepāja	2017	Latvian Higher League	19	1	3	0	4	0	26	1
Liepāja	2018	Latvian Higher League	24	0	2	0	2	0	28	0
Liepāja	2019	Latvian Higher League	18	0	1	0	1	0	20	0
Liepāja	2020	Latvian Higher League	18	1	1	0	-		19	1
Liepāja	2021	Latvian Higher League	2	0	1	0	0	0	3	0
Liepāja	Total		160	6	14	0	9	0	183	6
Career total			279	18	19	0	9	0	297	18

=== International ===
Latvia national team
Year	Apps	Goals
2016	2	0
2017	1	0
2018	4	0
Total	7	0

Statistics accurate as of match played 9 June 2018

== Honours ==
Liepāja

- Latvian Higher League (1): 2015
- Latvian Football Cup (2): 2017, 2020
