= Sallieu Bundu =

Sierra Leonean footballer

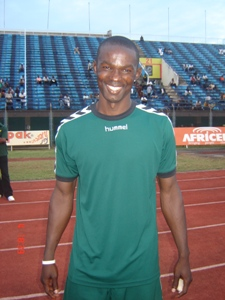

Personal information
- Full name: Sallieu Bundu
- Date of birth: January 1, 1984 (age 42)
- Place of birth: Freetown, Sierra Leone, Sierra Leone
- Height: 6 ft 1 in (1.85 m)
- Position: Forward

Senior career*
Years	Team	Apps	(Gls)
2008	Cleveland City Stars	19	(8)
2009–2011	Carolina RailHawks	30	(10)
2011	→ Charlotte Eagles (loan)	22	(7)
2012	Charleston Battery	16	(1)
2012	→ Ravan Baku (loan)	3	(1)
2013	VSI Tampa Bay FC	17	(2)

International career^{‡}
2008	Sierra Leone	4	(0)
- * Club domestic league appearances and goals as of September 6, 2012 ‡ National team caps and goals as of June 28, 2011

Sallieu Bundu (born January 1, 1984, in Freetown, Sierra Leone) nicknamed Teacher, is a Sierra Leonean footballer.

== Early life ==
Bundu, who is commonly known by his nickname Teacher, grew up in his hometown of Freetown, Sierra Leone, the second largest city in Sierra Leone. He attended the Independence Memorial High School. At the age of 15, Bundu fled on foot with his mother and siblings to Guinea to escape the civil war in his home country; his father was murdered by rebels. After five years of living in Guinea, Bundu's brother won a US immigrant visa in the Green Card Lottery, allowing the family to settle in the United States.

== Career ==
=== Professional ===
Bundu settled in Twinsburg, Ohio, and on April 10, 2008, signed with the Cleveland City Stars after impressing head coach Martin Rennie in a trial. He was a revelation in his first season with the team, netting 8 goals in 19 appearances, and on August 23, 2008, scored the winning goal for Cleveland in the USL Second Division championship game. Sallieu Bundu has walked on the way to sign a contract with Carolina RailHawks FC.

Carolina loaned Bundu to Charlotte Eagles of the USL Pro league for the 2011 season.

Bundu went on loan to Ravan Baku of the Azerbaijan Premier League at the start of the 2012–2013 season. Bundu made three appearances for Ravan, scoring once.

Bundu signed with USL Pro club Charleston Battery on March 20, 2012.

=== International ===
Bundu has recently been called up to the Sierra Leone national team.

== Philanthropy ==
Bundu physically left Sierra Leone, but Sierra Leone never left his heart. Throughout Bundu's professional career he often helped the people of Sierra Leone through collecting items such as shoes, clothing, and even soccer equipment and sending them "back home." But Bundu always longed to do more. It was the yearning in his heart to provide aid to the people of Sierra Leone that solidified the need for the Sal Bundu Foundation.

The Sal Bundu Foundation, is a 501(c)(3) organization whose mission is "to enhance the lives of the people of Sierra Leone through generous giving." The Sal Bundu Foundation collects monetary and non-monetary items such as shoes and clothing.'' Non-monetary items are packaged and shipped to orphanages and shelters in Sierra Leone for families and children in need. Monetary donations are used to provide structured assistance for those individuals.

Bundu also raises funds for the Sal Bundu Foundation through conducting youth soccer clinics where Bundu trains and teaching young men about the sport of soccer.
