= Francis Bossman =

Ghanaian footballer

Personal information
- Full name: Francis Jojo Bossman
- Date of birth: 24 June 1984 (age 42)
- Place of birth: Accra, Ghana
- Height: 1.80 m (5 ft 11 in)
- Position: Defensive midfielder

Senior career*
Years	Team	Apps	(Gls)
2002–2004	Berekum Arsenal		
2004–2009	Hearts of Oak		
2009–2010	New Edubiase United		
2010–2012	Sloboda Užice	38	(1)
2012	Ravan Baku	15	(0)
2013	Jagodina	1	(0)
2013	Sloga Petrovac na Mlavi	6	(0)
2014–2015	Sloboda Užice	13	(0)
2016	Mornar Bar	2	(0)

International career^{‡}
2003	Ghana	1	(0)
- * Club domestic league appearances and goals as of 22 March 2016 ‡ National team caps and goals as of 22 March 2016

Francis Bossman (born 24 June 1984) is a Ghanaian footballer who last played for FK Mornar in the Montenegrin First League.

== Club career ==
Born in Accra, Bossman begin his senior career in 2002 playing with Berekum Arsenal in the Ghana Premier League. His nickname is Makelele. He earned while still young a call to represent the Ghana national team, in 2003. All this contributed for his move to Hearts of Oak in 2004. Same year Hearts won the 2004 CAF Confederation Cup. Bossman will stay in Accra 5 consecutive seasons, winning 4 national championship titles.

In 2009 Bossman moved to New Edubiase United another Ghana Premier League club, but in summer 2010 he decided to accept an offer to move abroad and in the August 2010, he officially signed a contract with Serbian club FK Sloboda Užice for an undisclosed fee.

=== Ravan Baku ===
In the Summer of 2012 Bossman joined Ravan Baku of the Azerbaijan Premier League on a two-year contract.

=== Jagodina ===
On January 26, 2013, it was announced that Bossman left Ravan Baku to sign a 1.5-year contract for ambitious Serbian side FK Jagodina. However, because of a knee-injury Bossman missed most of the second half of the 2012–13 season and made only one league appearance before being released.

=== Sloga PM ===
In September 2013, Bossman signed for newly promoted Sloga Petrovac na Mlavi.

== National team ==
Jojo Bossman played one match for the Ghana national team in 2003.

== Honours ==
Hearts of Oak

- CAF Confederation Cup: 2004
- Ghana Premier League: 2004–05, 2005, 2006–07, 2008–09

Jagodina

- Serbian Cup: 2013
