= Juan Manuel Varea =

Argentine footballer (born 1986)

Juan Varea
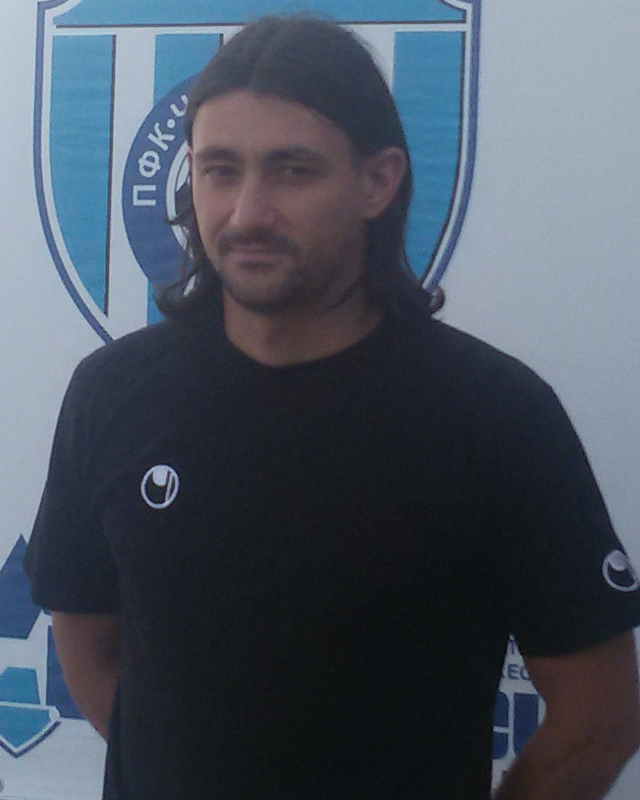

Personal information
- Full name: Juan Manuel Varea
- Date of birth: 23 March 1986 (age 40)
- Place of birth: Buenos Aires, Argentina
- Height: 1.78 m (5 ft 10 in)
- Positions: Second striker; attacking midfielder

Team information
- Current team: Kamen Ivanbegovina

Senior career*
Years	Team	Apps	(Gls)
2006–2007	Vélez Sársfield	5	(1)
2007	Deportivo Español	11	(2)
2008	Depor Aguablanca	18	(9)
2008–2009	Central Córdoba	18	(1)
2009–2012	Široki Brijeg	74	(26)
2012–2014	Ravan Baku	60	(17)
2014–2015	Željezničar Sarajevo	22	(3)
2015	Cherno More	6	(2)
2016	Bylis Ballsh	15	(1)
2016	Hibernians	12	(0)
2017	Imotski	13	(4)
2017–2019	Dugopolje	18	(2)
2018	→ RNK Split (loan)	13	(8)
2018–2019	Imotski		
2019–	Kamen Ivanbegovina		
- * Club domestic league appearances and goals as of 27 May 2018

Juan Manuel Varea (born 23 March 1986 in Buenos Aires) is an Argentine football player who currently plays for Croatian side NK Kamen Ivanbegovina.

== Career ==
Varea started his career with Vélez Sársfield and made his debut in the Argentine Primera División on 12 November 2006, replacing Lucas Castromán in the 72nd minute in a 3–0 win over Gimnasia La Plata. He scored his first goal for the club on 25 November to level the scoreline at 1–1 in an away draw against Nueva Chicago.

In the summer of 2007, Varea joined Deportivo Español in the third division, where he played 11 matches and scored two goals until December 2007. In 2008, Varea signed with Colombian side Depor. He also played for Central Córdoba in Rosario before joined NK Široki Brijeg in summer 2009.

Varea made his debut for Široki Brijeg in a 2–1 away loss against Sturm Graz on 16 July, in the second qualifying round of the 2009–10 Europa League. He made his league debut on 9 August against Željezničar Sarajevo and scored his first goal for the club on 30 August, in a 2–0 home win over Sloboda Tuzla. In January 2010, Varea was awarded the best foreign player in Bosnia and Herzegovina. At the 11th memorial tournament Gojko Šušak 2010 in Široki Brijeg he was awarded the best player of the tournament.

In June 2012, Varea joined Ravan Baku in the Azerbaijan Premier League. On 30 March 2013, he scored his first hat-trick in his career in a 6–2 away win over Turan IK. Varea made 31 appearances during the 2012–13 season finishing as the club's top scorer with 14 goals.

In July 2014, Varea moved back to Bosnia and Herzegovina, joining Željezničar Sarajevo.

On 25 June 2015, Varea signed a one-year contract with Bulgarian side Cherno More Varna, after a successful trial period with the club. He made his debut in a 1–1 home draw against Dinamo Minsk in the second qualifying round of the 2015–16 UEFA Europa League on 16 July. Varea scored his first goal on 11 September, opening a 2–1 home win over Lokomotiv Plovdiv.

In the summer 2019, Varea joined Croatian club NK Kamen Ivanbegovina.

== Career statistics ==
As of 1 June 2016

Club statistics
Season	Club	League	League		Cup		Continental		Total	
Season	Club	League	App	Goals	App	Goals	App	Goals	App	Goals
2006–07	Vélez Sársfield	Primera División	5	1	0	0	—		5	1
2007–08	Deportivo Español	Primera B Metropolitana	11	2	0	0	—		11	2
2008	Depor Aguablanca	Categoría Primera B	18	9	0	0	—		18	9
2008–09	Central Córdoba	Primera B Metropolitana	18	1	0	0	—		18	1
2009–10	Široki Brijeg	Premijer Liga	29	14	0	0	2	0	31	14
2010–11	Široki Brijeg	Premijer Liga	15	4	1	0	4	0	20	4
2011–12	Široki Brijeg	Premijer Liga	22	8	5	0	1	0	28	8
2012–13	Ravan Baku	Azerbaijan Premier League	31	14	3	1	—		34	15
2013–14	Ravan Baku	Azerbaijan Premier League	29	3	3	1	—		32	4
2014–15	Željezničar Sarajevo	Premijer Liga	20	2	2	1	—		22	3
2015–16	Cherno More	Bulgarian A Group	6	2	2	1	1	0	9	3
2015–16	Bylis Ballsh	Albanian Superliga	14	1	0	0	0	0	14	1
Total	Argentina		34	4	0	0	0	0	34	4
Total	Colombia		18	9	0	0	0	0	18	9
Total	Bosnia and Herzegovina		86	28	8	1	7	0	101	29
Total	Azerbaijan		60	17	6	2	0	0	66	19
Total	Bulgaria		6	2	2	1	1	0	9	3
Total	Albania		14	1	0	0	0	0	14	1
Career total			217	61	16	4	8	0	242	65
