= Nodar Mammadov =

Azerbaijani footballer (born 1988)

Personal information
- Full name: Nodar Mikayil oglu Mammadov
- Date of birth: 3 June 1988 (age 38)
- Place of birth: Kaspi, Georgian SSR, Soviet Union
- Height: 1.80 m (5 ft 11 in)
- Position: Defender

Team information
- Current team: Kapaz

Senior career*
Years	Team	Apps	(Gls)
2004–2007	FC Sahdag Qusar	23	(0)
2007–2008	FK Qarabağ	27	(0)
2008–2009	→ MOIK Baku (loan)	24	(0)
2009	→ FK Mughan (loan)	0	(0)
2009–2010	FK Qarabağ	5	(0)
2010–2013	FC Gabala	54	(2)
2013	Ravan Baku	17	(0)
2013–2015	Sumgayit	60	(0)
2016	Khazar Lankaran	3	(0)
2016–2017	Turan Tovuz		
2017	Mil-Muğan	0	(0)
2017	Yeni Boğaziçi	15	(1)
2018	Khazar Baku		
2018–2019	Shuvalan		
2019–	Kapaz		

International career^{‡}
2007–2008	Azerbaijan U21	6	(2)
2007–	Azerbaijan	4	(0)
- * Club domestic league appearances and goals as of 11:57, 25 May 2020 (UTC) ‡ National team caps and goals as of 23 June 2009

Nodar Mammadov (Azerbaijani: Nodar Məmmədov; born 3 June 1988 in Kaspi, Georgia) is an Azerbaijani football defender who plays for Kapaz PFK.

== Career statistics ==
As of 2 July 2014

Club performance			League		Cup		Continental		Total	
Season	Club	League	Apps	Goals	Apps	Goals	Apps	Goals	Apps	Goals
Azerbaijan			League		Azerbaijan Cup		Europe		Total	
2004–05	Sahdag Qusar	Azerbaijan Premier League	18	0			—		18	0
2005–06	Sahdag Qusar	Azerbaijan Premier League	12	0			—		12	0
2006–07	Sahdag Qusar	Azerbaijan Premier League	11	0			—		11	0
2006–07	Qarabağ	Azerbaijan Premier League	9	0			—		9	0
2007–08	Qarabağ	Azerbaijan Premier League	18	0			—		18	0
2008–09	MOIK Baku (Loan)	Azerbaijan Premier League	24	0			—		24	0
2009–10	FK Mughan (Loan)	Azerbaijan Premier League	0	0			—		0	0
2009–10	Qarabağ	Azerbaijan Premier League	5	0	0	0	—		5	0
2010–11	Gabala	Azerbaijan Premier League	27	1	3	0	—		30	1
2011–12	Gabala	Azerbaijan Premier League	18	1	1	0	—		19	1
2012–13	Gabala	Azerbaijan Premier League	9	0	1	0	—		10	0
2012–13	Ravan Baku	Azerbaijan Premier League	14	0	2	0	—		14	0
2013–14	Ravan Baku	Azerbaijan Premier League	3	0	0	0	—		3	0
2013–14	Sumgayit	Azerbaijan Premier League	23	0	1	0	—		24	0
Total	Azerbaijan		191	2			0	0	191	2
Career total			191	2			0	0	191	2
