= Igor Souza (footballer, born 1979) =

Brazilian footballer

Personal information
- Full name: Igor Claudinei Reis Souza
- Date of birth: 27 May 1979 (age 47)
- Place of birth: Jequié, Brazil
- Height: 1.74 m (5 ft 9 in)
- Position: Forward

Senior career*
Years	Team	Apps	(Gls)
2000	Central		
2000–2001	Estrela da Amadora	12	(1)
2001–2002	Torreense		
2002–2003	Micaelense		
2003–2004	Torreense		
2004–2005	Marco	10	(2)
2005–2006	Estrela da Amadora	7	(0)
2005–2006	→ Estoril Praia (loan)	14	(3)
2006–2007	Estoril Praia	28	(3)
2007–2009	Gil Vicente	45	(7)
2009–2010	Feirense	20	(3)
2010–2011	Mughan	23	(3)
2011	Ravan Baku	16	(4)
2013	Ceilandense		
2014	Interporto		
2017	Capital CF		
- * Club domestic league appearances and goals

Igor Claudinei Reis Souza (born 27 May 1979) is a Brazilian former footballer who played as a forward for Estrela da Amadora and Gil Vicente in the Portuguese Primeira Liga. He also played for Mughan and Ravan Baku in the Azerbaijan Premier League.

== Career statistics ==
Club statistics
Season	Club	League	League		Cup		Other		Total	
Season	Club	League	App	Goals	App	Goals	App	Goals	App	Goals
Azerbaijan			League		Azerbaijan Cup		Europe		Total	
2010–11	Mughan	Azerbaijan Premier League	23	3	1	0	—		24	3
2011–12	Ravan Baku	Azerbaijan Premier League	16	4	1	0	—		17	4
Total			69	7	3	0	0	0	72	7
