= Sheriff Suma =

Sierra Leonean footballer (born 1986)

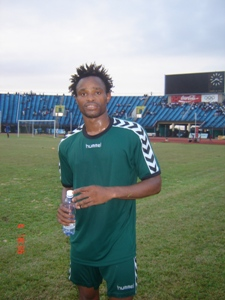
- Suma with Sierra Leone

Personal information
- Full name: Sheriff Awilo Suma
- Date of birth: 12 October 1986 (age 40)
- Place of birth: Freetown, Sierra Leone
- Height: 1.83 m (6 ft 0 in)
- Position: Left winger

Senior career*
Years	Team	Apps	(Gls)
2002–2005	F.C. Kallon		
2005–2006	Åtvidabergs FF	49	(7)
2007–2008	GAIS	14	(0)
2008	→ Haugesund (loan)	11	(1)
2009	Ermis Aradippou	14	(2)
2010	Kocaelispor	5	(1)
2010–2011	Jönköpings Södra	22	(3)
2011–2012	Ravan Baku	38	(1)
2013	FC Johansen		
2014–2015	Syrianska Kerburan		
2015	Ravan Baku	17	(1)
2018–2019	Atlanta SC		

International career
2006–2013	Sierra Leone	36	(3)
- * Club domestic league appearances and goals

Sheriff Awilo Suma (born 12 October 1986) is a Sierra Leonean former professional footballer who played as a left winger. A member of Sierra Leone U17 national team at the 2003 FIFA U-17 World Championship in Finland, he made his debut for the senior national team in 2006.

Suma is one of the most popular Sierra Leonean footballers and he is known for frequently changing his unusual and colourful hairstyles.

== Career ==
Suma was born in Freetown, Sierra Leone. Like many African footballers, Suma grew up playing street football in his neighbourhood.

He fled his country's civil war and moved to The Gambia in 1997. Suma was widely considered the best Sierra Leonean youth footballer while in The Gambia. In 2001, the young Suma was discovered by Sierra Leonean football agent Chernor Musa Jalloh while playing in a local football league in Banjul, Gambia. Jalloh introduced Suma to Mohamed Kallon, Sierra Leone's most successful footballer. Kallon asked him if he would like to play for F.C. Kallon in the Sierra Leone National Premier League. Suma returned to Sierra Leone for the first time in five years in 2002 and sign for top Sierra Leone National Premier League club F.C. Kallon, which is owned by Mohamed Kallon himself. In his first season in the Sierra Leonean Premier League, Suma was the second top goal-scorer.

After playing in the qualifying rounds, Suma was omitted from the final squad for the 2003 African U-17 Championship in Swaziland, something he describes as the worst moment of his life. In the championship, Sierra Leone placed second, behind Cameroon, thereby qualifying for the 2003 FIFA U-17 World Championship in Finland.

Fortunately for Suma, he was called back to the squad for the U-17 world championship in Finland. While the team failed to advance past the group stage of the tournament, the coach commended Suma for his energy and flair with the ball. Following this event, 12 of the 23 players failed to return to Sierra Leone and some later applied for political asylum. Among those who did return home was Suma.

Shortly after the U-17 world championship, talent scout Chernor Musa Jalloh helped Suma move to the Swedish team Åtvidaberg on a two-year contract from F.C. Kallon.

Suma made his debut for the senior national team on 3 September 2006 in a 2008 African Nations Cup qualifying match against Mali in Freetown. In December 2006, Suma was traded to GAIS, one of Sweden's oldest teams.

Suma was loaned to FK Haugesund in the summer of 2008 for the rest of the season.

In December 2012 Suma was released from his contract with Ravan Baku.

In June 2014 Suma joined Syrianska Kerburan with fellow Sierra Leone International Samuel Barlay, signing a new one-year contract with Syrianska Kerburan in December 2014.

In July 2015, Suma's proposed move to Kvik Halden FK fell through, before later in the same month he re-signed for Azerbaijan Premier League side Ravan Baku FK.

== Career statistics ==
As of 12 November 2013

Appearances and goals by club, season and competition
Club	Season	League			Cup		Continental		Total	
Club	Season	Division	Apps	Goals	Apps	Goals	Apps	Goals	Apps	Goals
Åtvidaberg	2005	Superettan	23	4			–		23	4
Åtvidaberg	2006	Superettan	26	3			–		26	3
Åtvidaberg	Total		49	7	0	0	0	0	49	7
GAIS	2007	Allsvenskan	9	0			–		9	0
GAIS	2008	Allsvenskan	5	0			–		5	0
GAIS	Total		14	0	0	0	0	0	14	0
Haugesund (loan)	2008	Adeccoligaen	11	1			–		11	1
Ermis Aradippou	2009–10	Marfin Laiki League	14	2	0	0	–		14	2
Kocaelispor	2009–10	PTT 1. Lig	5	1	0	0	–		5	1
Jönköpings Södra	2010	Superettan	10	1			–		10	1
Jönköpings Södra	2011	Superettan	11	1	2	0	–		13	1
Jönköpings Södra	Total		21	2	2	0	0	0	23	2
Ravan Baku	2011–12	Azerbaijan Premier League	28	1	1	0	–		29	1
Ravan Baku	2012–13	Azerbaijan Premier League	10	0	1	0	–		11	0
Ravan Baku	Total		38	1	2	0	0	0	40	1
Career total			152	14	4	0	0	0	156	14
