= 2014–15 AZAL PFC season =

AZAL
2014–15 season
- President: Zaur Akhundov
- Manager: Tarlan Ahmadov
- Stadium: AZAL Arena
- Premier League: 6th
- Azerbaijan Cup: Quarterfinal vs Neftchi Baku
- Top goalscorer: League: Freddy Mombongo-Dues (13); All: Freddy Mombongo-Dues (14)
- Highest home attendance: 5,000 vs Khazar Lankaran; 9 August 2014
- Lowest home attendance: 5,000 vs Sumgayit; 29 November 2014
- Average home league attendance: 638; 29 May 2015
Home colours	Away colours	Third colours

The AZAL 2014–15 season is AZAL's tenth Azerbaijan Premier League season. They will participate in the League and the Azerbaijan Cup. It will be their first full season with Tarlan Ahmadov as their manager.

== Squad ==
As of 31 January 2015

Note: Flags indicate national team as defined under FIFA eligibility rules; some limited exceptions apply. Players may hold more than one non-FIFA nationality.

No.	Pos.	Nation	Player
1	GK	AZE	Ruslan Majidov
3	DF	ESP	Juanfran
4	DF	GEO	Lasha Kasradze
5	DF	AZE	Karim Diniyev
6	FW	BRA	Eduardo
7	MF	AZE	Tamkin Khalilzade (loan from Qarabağ)
8	MF	AZE	Seymur Asadov (loan from Gabala)
9	DF	AZE	Aydin Gasimov
10	MF	AZE	Nijat Gurbanov
11	FW	AZE	Ruslan Nasirli
12	MF	HON	Luis Ramos
13	MF	AZE	Shahriyar Rahimov
15	DF	LAT	Oskars Kļava

No.	Pos.	Nation	Player
16	GK	MDA	Stanislav Namașco
17	MF	NGR	Victor Igbekoyi
18	DF	AZE	Orkhan Lalayev (on loan from Ravan Baku)
20	FW	COD	Freddy Mombongo-Dues
21	DF	AZE	Novruz Mammadov
22	DF	AZE	Eltun Yagublu (loan from Qarabağ)
23	DF	AZE	Aleksandr Shemonayev
24	MF	AZE	Azer Mammadov
25	MF	UKR	Valeriy Kutsenko
27	MF	AZE	Rashad Abdullayev
85	GK	AZE	Kamal Bayramov
—	DF	AZE	Agil Nabiyev

== Transfers ==
=== Summer ===
In: Note: Flags indicate national team as defined under FIFA eligibility rules; some limited exceptions apply. Players may hold more than one non-FIFA nationality.

No.	Pos.	Nation	Player
6	FW	BRA	Eduardo (from (Bahrain) Riffa)
7	MF	AZE	Tamkin Khalilzade (loan from (Azerbaijan) Qarabağ)
10	MF	BUL	Tomi Kostadinov (from (Greece) Chania)
11	FW	COL	John Córdoba (from (Colombia) América S.A.)
12	MF	HON	Luis Ramos (from (Czech Republic) Teplice)
14	MF	AZE	Asif Mirili (from (Azerbaijan) Inter Baku)
16	GK	MDA	Stanislav Namașco (from (Moldova) FC Dinamo-Auto)
18	DF	AZE	Orkhan Lalayev (loan from (Azerbaijan) Ravan Baku)
20	FW	COD	Freddy Mombongo-Dues (from (Belgium) Royal Antwerp)
22	DF	AZE	Eltun Yagublu (loan from (Azerbaijan) Qarabağ)
30	MF	AZE	Seymur Asadov (loan from (Azerbaijan) Gabala)
85	GK	AZE	Kamal Bayramov (from (Azerbaijan) Araz-Naxçıvan)
—	MF	IRI	Mohammad Hossein Mehrazma (Trial)
—	MF	NGR	Nnaemeka Ajuru (Trial)

Out: Note: Flags indicate national team as defined under FIFA eligibility rules; some limited exceptions apply. Players may hold more than one non-FIFA nationality.

No.	Pos.	Nation	Player
3	DF	AZE	Aleksandr Shemonayev (to (Azerbaijan) Khazar Lankaran)
4	DF	BRA	Junior Ailton
5	MF	AZE	Murad Agayev (to (Azerbaijan) Sumgayit)
7	MF	AZE	Javid Taghiyev (to (Azerbaijan) Qarabağ)
8	MF	AZE	Garib Ibrahimov (to (Azerbaijan) Araz-Naxçıvan)
9	MF	AZE	Orkhan Hasanov (to (Azerbaijan) Ravan Baku)
10	MF	USA	Will John (to (Morocco) MAS Fez)
12	GK	AZE	Jahangir Hasanzade (to (Azerbaijan) Khazar Lankaran)
14	MF	AZE	Habil Nurəhmədov
16	GK	AZE	Elchin Sadigov (to (Azerbaijan) Araz-Naxçıvan)
18	MF	SLE	Samuel Barlay (to (Sweden) Syrianska)
20	DF	SRB	Branislav Arsenijević
21	FW	AZE	Rey Mammadbayli
22	FW	TJK	Akhtam Khamrakulov (to (Tajikistan) Regar-TadAZ)
28	MF	AZE	Emin Jafarguliyev (to (Azerbaijan) Araz-Naxçıvan)
89	FW	BIH	Nedo Turković (to (Bosnia and Herzegovina) Željezničar Sarajevo)
—	GK	AZE	Elmaddin Mammadov
—	GK	AZE	Tural Assad
—	DF	AZE	Elmin Ahmadov
—	MF	AZE	Elgun Abbasli
—	MF	AZE	Farid Ganbarov

=== Winter ===
In: Note: Flags indicate national team as defined under FIFA eligibility rules; some limited exceptions apply. Players may hold more than one non-FIFA nationality.

No.	Pos.	Nation	Player
10	MF	AZE	Nijat Gurbanov (loan from (Azerbaijan) Neftchi Baku)
11	FW	AZE	Ruslan Nasirli (from (Azerbaijan) Araz-Naxçıvan)
23	DF	AZE	Aleksandr Shemonayev (from (Azerbaijan) Khazar Lankaran)
24	MF	AZE	Azer Mammadov (from (Azerbaijan) Araz-Naxçıvan)
25	MF	UKR	Valeriy Kutsenko (from (Latvia) Daugava Daugavpils)
—	DF	AZE	Agil Nabiyev (from (Azerbaijan) Araz-Naxçıvan)

Out: Note: Flags indicate national team as defined under FIFA eligibility rules; some limited exceptions apply. Players may hold more than one non-FIFA nationality.

No.	Pos.	Nation	Player
10	MF	BUL	Tomi Kostadinov (to (Bulgaria) Minyor Pernik)
11	FW	COL	John Córdoba
14	MF	AZE	Asif Mirili
19	MF	AZE	Orkhan Safiyaroglu
23	DF	AZE	Tural Narimanov
25	DF	AZE	Adil Nagiyev (loan to (Azerbaijan) Zira)

== Friendlies ==
19 June 2014	AZAL	4 – 0	Baku, Azerbaijan
AZST (UTC+5)		Report

19 June 2014	AZAL	3 – 0	Ravan Baku	Baku, Azerbaijan
AZST (UTC+5)	A.Hasanov 12' (o.g.); A.Gasimov 55'; O.Safiyaroglu 78'	Report

20 July 2014	AZAL (Azerbaijan)	2 – 1	(Turkey) Mersin İdmanyurdu	Turkey
AZST (UTC+5)	Goal	Report	Goal

26 July 2014	AZAL (Azerbaijan)	2 – 1	(Turkey) Antalyaspor	Turkey
AZST (UTC+5)	Goal	Report	Goal

27 July 2014	AZAL (Azerbaijan)	0 – 0	(Georgia (country)) Kolkheti-1913	Turkey
AZST (UTC+5)		Report

3 August 2014	Inter Baku	2 – 0	AZAL	Baku
AZST (UTC+5)	Tskhadadze 5'; A.Mammadov 82'	Report		Stadium: Shafa Stadium

15 January 2015	AZAL	2 – 2	Qaradağ Lökbatan	Baku
AZT (UTC+4)	Mombongo-Dues (.)	Report	Goal	Stadium: AZAL Arena

18 January 2015	Sumgayit	0 – 0	AZAL	Sumqayit
AZT (UTC+4)		Report		Stadium: Kapital Bank Arena

19 January 2015	AZAL	1 – 0	Sumgayit	Baku
AZT (UTC+4)	S.Asadov 68'	Report		Stadium: AZAL Arena

22 January 2015	Baku	0 – 1	AZAL	Baku
AZT (UTC+4)		Report	S.Asadov 14'	Stadium: Tofik Bakhramov Stadium

24 January 2015	AZAL	1 – 1	Shusha	Baku
AZT (UTC+4)	K.Diniyev	Report	Goal	Stadium: AZAL Arena

== Competitions ==
=== Azerbaijan Premier League ===
==== Results summary ====
Overall								Home						Away					
Pld	W	D	L	GF	GA	GD	Pts	W	D	L	GF	GA	GD	W	D	L	GF	GA	GD
32	10	9	13	37	41	−4	39	5	6	5	24	22	+2	5	3	8	13	19	−6

Last updated: 29 May 2015.
Source: Soccerway

==== Results ====
9 August 2014 1	AZAL	1 – 1	Khazar Lankaran	Baku
20:00 AZST (UTC+5)	Khalilzade (yellow card) 29'; Rahimov (yellow card) 32' (yellow-red card) 59'; Kostadinov 74' (yellow card) 90+2'	Summary	Aliyev 35'; Sankoh (yellow card) 72'	Stadium: AZAL Arena; Attendance: 5,000; Referee: Rahim Häsänov

17 August 2014 2	Simurq	2 – 0	AZAL	Zaqatala
19:00 AZST (UTC+5)	R.Eyyubov 4'; T.Narimanov 15' (o.g.); Ćeran (yellow card) 66'	Summary		Stadium: Zaqatala City Stadium; Attendance: 2,000; Referee: Aliyar Ağayev

25 August 2014 3	AZAL	Postponed	Neftchi Baku	Baku
19:00 AZST (UTC+5)		Summary		Stadium: AZAL Arena; Referee: Orkhan Mämmädov

30 August 2014 4	Gabala	1 – 2	AZAL	Qabala
19:30 AZST (UTC+5)	Ropotan (yellow card) 3'; Farkaš (yellow card) 45+1'; Abışov (yellow card) 64'; Huseynov 82' (pen.)	Summary	Kļava (yellow card) 10'; Eduardo (yellow card) 31' (yellow-red card) 90+3'; Abdullayev 45+1' (pen.); Kasradze (yellow card) 56'; Ramos (yellow card) 65'; K.Diniyev 68' (yellow card) 69'; Namașco (yellow card) 90'	Stadium: Gabala City Stadium; Attendance: 2,800; Referee: Rauf Jabbarov

13 September 2014 5	AZAL	0 – 3	Qarabağ	Baku
21:00 AZST (UTC+5)	Córdoba (yellow card) 16'; E.Yagublu (yellow card) 39'; A.Gasimov (yellow card) 68'	Summary	Chumbinho 20'; George 42'; Reynaldo 66' (yellow card) 81'	Stadium: AZAL Arena; Attendance: 500; Referee: Orkhan Mämmädov

20 September 2014 6	Sumgayit	0 – 1	AZAL	Sumqayit
17:00 AZST (UTC+5)	B.Hasanalizade (yellow card) 48'; Hüseynov (yellow card) 54'; S.Alkhasov (yellow card) 89'	Summary	Mombongo-Dues 24' (yellow card) 75'; Rahimov (yellow card) 51'; K.Diniyev (yellow card) 69'; Kļava (yellow card) 82'; N.Mammadov (yellow card) 85'	Stadium: Kapital Bank Arena; Attendance: 1,600; Referee: Omar Paşayev

27 September 2014 7	AZAL	1 – 1	Inter Baku	Baku
17:00 AZST (UTC+5)	K.Diniyev 4'; E.Yagublu (yellow card) 18'; Ramos (yellow card) 28'; Eduardo (yellow card) 32'; Rahimov (yellow card) 56'	Summary	Hajiyev (yellow card) 58'; J.Diniyev (yellow card) 73'; Álvaro 76'; Aghayev (yellow card) 81'; Dashdemirov (yellow card) 82'	Stadium: AZAL Arena; Attendance: 350; Referee: Elvin Äsgärov

18 October 2014 8	Araz-Naxçıvan	Annulled^{2}	AZAL	Nakhchivan
15:00 AZST (UTC+5)	Zubkov (yellow card) 12'; T.Hümbätov (yellow card) 23'; Nabiyev (yellow card) 33'; D.Janalidze (yellow card) 42' (goal) 44'; B.Soltanov 62'	Summary	Abdullayev (yellow card) 13' (goal) 23' (pen.); Mombongo-Dues (yellow card) 28'; Eduardo 49'; Ramos (yellow card) 57'	Stadium: Nakhchivan City Stadium; Attendance: 4,100; Referee: Fariz Yusifov

25 October 2014 9	AZAL	0 – 1	Baku	Baku
17:00 AZST (UTC+5)	Abdullayev (yellow card) 45'; N.Mammadov (yellow card) 87'; Igbekoyi (yellow card) 90'	Summary	Maharramov (yellow card) 28'; A.Guliyev (yellow card) 35'; N.Novruzov 46'; V.Baybalayev (yellow card) 62' (yellow-red card) 77'	Stadium: AZAL Arena; Attendance: 400; Referee: Elvin Äsgärov

29 October 2014 10	AZAL	2 – 2	Simurq	Baku
17:00 AZT (UTC+4)	Kļava (yellow card) 48'; Abdullayev 56' (pen.); Rahimov (yellow card) 73'; Eduardo 79'	Summary	S.Zargarov 15'; R.Mammadov (yellow card) 56'; T.Akhundov (yellow card) 76'; Gökdemir 90+1'	Stadium: AZAL Arena; Attendance: 250; Referee: Fariz Yusifov

2 November 2014 11	Neftchi Baku	4 – 0	AZAL	Baku
17:15 AZT (UTC+4)	E.Yagublu 10' (o.g.); Denis 38'; Canales 71', 85'; E.Abdullayev (yellow card) 73'	Summary	Ramos (yellow card) 80' (yellow-red card) 82'; Córdoba (yellow card) 84'	Stadium: Bakcell Arena; Attendance: 1,000; Referee: Aliyar Ağayev

20 November 2014 12	AZAL	3 – 3	Gabala	Baku
18:00 AZT (UTC+4)	Eduardo 32' (yellow card) 59'; Igbekoyi 50'; Mombongo-Dues 80'; E.Yagublu (yellow card) 82'	Summary	Farkaš (yellow card) 18'; Kasradze 23' (o.g.); S.Guliyev (yellow card) 25'; Marquinhos 70'; R.Tagizade (yellow card) 78'; Huseynov 87' (pen.)	Stadium: AZAL Arena; Attendance: 200; Referee: Omar Paşayev

23 November 2014 13	Qarabağ	2 – 1	AZAL	Baku
15:00 AZT (UTC+4)	Teli (yellow card) 24'; Gurbanov 30'; E.Yagublu 57' (o.g.)	Summary	Majidov (red card) 31'; Eduardo (yellow card) 53'; Abdullayev 61' (pen.)	Stadium: Tofiq Bahramov Stadium^{1} Attendance: 400; Referee: Ingilab Mämmädov

29 November 2014 14	AZAL	3 – 2	Sumgayit	Baku
15:00 AZT (UTC+4)	Abdullayev 39'; Igbekoyi (yellow card) 55' (goal) 63'; K.Diniyev (yellow card) 61'; N.Mammadov 73'	Summary	O.Aliyev 45'; T.Mikayilov 51'	Stadium: AZAL Arena; Attendance: 150; Referee: Fariz Yusifov

7 December 2014 15	Inter Baku	1 – 0	AZAL	Baku
17:15 AZT (UTC+4)	Nildo 68'; Amisulashvili (yellow card) 76'; Abatsiyev (yellow card) 90+4'	Summary	Rahimov (yellow card) 26'; Igbekoyi (yellow card) 72'; N.Mammadov (yellow card) 82'	Stadium: Inter Arena; Attendance: 200; Referee: Rahim Häsänov

12 December 2014 16	AZAL	– ^{2}	Araz-Naxçıvan	Baku
AZT (UTC+4)		[ Summary]		Stadium: AZAL Arena

17 December 2014 17	Baku	1 – 3	AZAL	Baku
14:00 AZT (UTC+4)	Jabá (yellow card) 17'; E.Manafov (yellow card) 17'; N.Novruzov (yellow card) 26' (goal) 89'; V.Baybalayev (yellow card) 45+1'	Summary	Kostadinov 42', 45'; Kļava 61'; S.Asadov (yellow card) 64'; Juanfran (yellow card) 75'	Stadium: Tofik Bakhramov Stadium; Attendance: 500; Referee: Elvin Äsgärov

21 December 2014 18	Khazar Lankaran	1 – 1	AZAL	Lankaran
15:00 AZT (UTC+4)	Fernando Gabriel 60'; Ramaldanov (yellow card) 65'; Amirguliyev (yellow card) 80'	Summary	O.Lalayev (yellow card) 29'; Kļava (yellow card) 38'; Mombongo-Dues 43'; Eduardo (yellow card) 78'	Stadium: Lankaran City Stadium; Attendance: 1,000; Referee: Aliyar Ağayev

31 January 2015 19	AZAL	2 – 1	Neftchi Baku	Baku
15:00 AZT (UTC+4)	Mombongo-Dues 26', 90+2'	Summary	Canales 68' (pen.)	Stadium: AZAL Arena; Attendance: 350; Referee: Elvin Äsgärov

6 February 2015 20	Gabala	0 – 1	AZAL	Qabala
14:00 AZT (UTC+4)	E.Jamalov (yellow card) 73'	Summary	A.Shemonayev (yellow card) 28'; O.Lalayev (yellow card) 70'; Igbekoyi (yellow card) 75' (yellow-red card) 78'; Abdullayev 90+3' (pen.); S.Asadov (yellow card) 90+3'	Stadium: Gabala City Stadium; Attendance: 1,500; Referee: Rahim Häsänov

11 February 2015 21	AZAL	0 – 1	Qarabağ	Baku
15:00 AZT (UTC+4)	Kutsenko (yellow card) 56'; A.Shemonayev (yellow card) 67'; N.Gurbanov (yellow card) 85'	Summary	Reynaldo 57'; Medvedev (yellow card) 60'; George (yellow card) 71'; J.Taghiyev (yellow card) 73'	Stadium: AZAL Arena; Attendance: 500; Referee: Orkhan Mämmädov

15 February 2015 22	Sumgayit	0 – 0	AZAL	Sumqayit
16:00 AZT (UTC+4)	Chertoganov (yellow card) 15'; Kurbanov (yellow card) 74'; Fardjad-Azad (yellow card) 75'	Summary	N.Mammadov (yellow card) 45'; S.Asadov (yellow card) 50'; O.Lalayev (yellow card) 90+2'	Stadium: Kapital Bank Arena; Attendance: 500

19 February 2015 23	AZAL	1 – 1	Inter Baku	Baku
15:00 AZT (UTC+4)	Mombongo-Dues 1'; N.Gurbanov (yellow card) 90+4'	Summary	Nildo 18'; Špičić (yellow card) 59'; Tskhadadze (yellow card) 90+4'	Stadium: AZAL Arena; Attendance: 250; Referee: Fariz Yusifov

24 February 2015 3	AZAL	0 – 1	Neftchi Baku	Baku
15:00 AZT (UTC+4)	Juanfran (yellow card) 53'	Summary	Canales 8'; Cardoso (yellow card) 11'; M.Isayev (yellow card) 27'; Yunuszade (yellow card) 57'; Mammadov (yellow card) 70'; Flavinho (yellow card) 79'; E.Mehdiyev (yellow card) 88'	Stadium: AZAL Arena; Attendance: 800; Referee: Elvin Äsgärov

27 February 2015 24	Araz-Naxçıvan	– ^{2}	AZAL	Nakhchivan
AZT (UTC+4)		[ Summary]		Stadium: Nakhchivan City Stadium

8 March 2015 25	AZAL	2 – 0	Baku	Baku
16:00 AZT (UTC+4)	A.Gasimov 79'; Kasradze (yellow card) 81'; N.Gurbanov (yellow card) 83' (goal) 90+1'; Abdullayev (red card) 86'; K.Bayramov (yellow card) 90'	Summary	N.Asgarov (yellow card) 23'; Jabá (yellow card) 36' (yellow-red card) 69'	Stadium: AZAL Arena; Attendance: 200; Referee: Rahim Häsänov

18 March 2015 26	AZAL	3 – 1	Khazar Lankaran	Baku
16:00 AZT (UTC+4)	Kutsenko 20'; Mombongo-Dues 42', 62'; Rahimov (yellow card) 59'; Khalilzade (yellow card) 64'; S.Asadov (yellow card) 72'	Summary	I.Alakbarov 14'; Sankoh (yellow card) 19'	Stadium: AZAL Arena; Attendance: 300; Referee: Elvin Äsgärov

1 April 2015 27	Simurq	1 – 0	AZAL	Zaqatala
15:00 AZST (UTC+5)	Ćeran 37' (pen.) (yellow card) 47'; T.Akhundov (yellow card) 41'; S.Zargarov (yellow card) 43'	Summary	O.Lalayev (yellow card) 16'; A.Shemonayev (yellow card) 37'; Mombongo-Dues (yellow card) 41'	Stadium: Zaqatala City Stadium; Attendance: 1,500; Referee: Orkhan Mämmädov

5 April 2015 28	AZAL	0 – 4	Gabala	Baku
17:00 AZST (UTC+5)	N.Mammadov (yellow card) 21'; Majidov (yellow card) 40'; Kutsenko (yellow card) 51'	Summary	Huseynov 24', 41' (pen.) (yellow card) 45'; Mendy 26'; Rafael Santos (yellow card) 47'; Ricardinho (yellow card) 66'; Abışov (yellow card) 79'; Ehiosun 86'	Stadium: AZAL Arena; Attendance: 500; Referee: Aliyar Ağayev

9 April 2015 29	Qarabağ	2 – 1	AZAL	Baku
17:00 AZST (UTC+5)	George 20'; Sadygov (yellow card) 40'; Nadirov 50'	Summary	S.Asadov 10'; Kutsenko (yellow card) 44'; Juanfran (yellow card) 47'; Mombongo-Dues (yellow card) 67'	Stadium: Tofiq Bahramov Stadium^{1} Attendance: 800; Referee: Rahim Häsänov

17 April 2015 30	AZAL	1 – 1	Sumgayit	Baku
16:00 AZST (UTC+5)	S.Asadov (yellow card) 44'; Juanfran (yellow card) 62'; Kutsenko (yellow card) 75'	Summary	J.Hajiyev (yellow card) 64'; Kurbanov 90+1'	Stadium: AZAL Arena; Attendance: 250; Referee: Orkhan Mämmädov

25 April 2015 31	Inter Baku	2 – 0	AZAL	Baku
18:00 AZST (UTC+5)	J.Diniyev (yellow card) 35'; Dashdemirov 59', 76'	Summary	Kasradze (yellow card) 90+2'	Stadium: Inter Arena; Attendance: 300; Referee: Ramil Diniyev

2 May 2015 32	AZAL	– ^{2}	Araz-Naxçıvan	Baku
AZST (UTC+5)		[ Summary]		Stadium: AZAL Arena

9 May 2015 33	Baku	0 – 2	AZAL	Baku
17:00 AZST (UTC+5)	Pelagias (yellow card) 40'; V.Baybalayev (yellow card) 48' (yellow-red card) 73'; Jabá (yellow card) 58'; M.Madatov (red card) 90+2'	Summary	Abdullayev 45'; Mombongo-Dues (yellow card) 58' (goal) 75'	Stadium: Tofik Bakhramov Stadium; Attendance: 400; Referee: Rahim Häsänov

16 May 2015 34	Khazar Lankaran	1 – 0	AZAL	Lankaran
18:00 AZST (UTC+5)	Jalilov (yellow card) 28'; E.Rzazadä (yellow card) 76'; Amirguliyev 82'	Summary	E.Yagublu (yellow card) 59'	Stadium: Lankaran City Stadium; Attendance: 1,700; Referee: Ramil Diniyev

22 May 2015 35	AZAL	5 – 0	Simurq	Baku
19:00 AZST (UTC+5)	Mombongo-Dues 17', 39', 43', 80'; Abdullayev 54'	Summary	T.Akhundov (yellow card) 18'; A.Agajanov (red card) 21'	Stadium: AZAL Arena; Attendance: 200; Referee: Fariz Yusifov

28 May 2015 36	Neftchi Baku	1 – 1	AZAL	Baku
20:00 AZST (UTC+5)	Ramos (yellow card) 43'; E.Abdullayev 60'; A.Guliyev (red card) 75'; E.Mehdiyev (yellow card) 81'; Mammadov (yellow card) 90'	Summary	S.Asadov (yellow card) 20'; K.Diniyev (yellow card) 41'; O.Lalayev (yellow card) 44' (yellow-red card) 55'; N.Gurbanov 84'; K.Bayramov (yellow card) 90+5'	Stadium: Bakcell Arena; Attendance: 500; Referee: Elvin Äsgärov

==== League table ====
Pos	Team	Pld	W	D	L	GF	GA	GD	Pts	Qualification
1	Qarabağ (C)	32	20	8	4	51	28	+23	68	Qualification for Champions League second qualifying round
2	Inter Baku	32	17	12	3	55	20	+35	63	Qualification for Europa League first qualifying round
3	Gabala	32	15	9	8	46	35	+11	54	Qualification for Europa League first qualifying round
4	Neftchi Baku	32	13	10	9	38	33	+5	49	Qualification for Europa League first qualifying round
5	Simurq	32	11	6	15	41	39	+2	39	
6	AZAL	32	10	9	13	37	42	−5	39	
7	Khazar Lankaran	32	8	8	16	35	46	−11	32	
8	Sumgayit	32	7	10	15	32	43	−11	31	
9	Baku	32	3	8	21	19	68	−49	17	Relegation to the Azerbaijan First Division
10	Araz-Naxçıvan (Note: Araz-Naxçıvan were officially withdrawn from the league on 17 November 2014)	0	0	0	0	0	0	0	0	Team withdrawn

Source: uefa.com
Rules for classification: 1) points; 2) head-to-head points; 3) head-to-head goal difference; 4) head-to-head goals scored; 5. head-to-head away goals (only if 2 teams are tied); 6) goal difference; 7) goals scored.
(C) Champions

=== Azerbaijan Cup ===
3 December 2014 Second Round	Neftchala	1 – 2	AZAL	Neftçala
13:00 AZT (UTC+4)	M. Aliyev 9'; M.Bädälbäyli (yellow card) 21'; R.Kärimov (yellow card) 67'; M.Şahquliyev (yellow card) 82'; V.Güläliyev (yellow card) 86'; E.Adışirinli (red card) 90+4'	Summary	Eduardo (yellow card) 17'; Mombongo-Dues 88'; Kasradze 90+2' Rahimov (yellow card) 90+2'; Juanfran (red card) 90+4'	Stadium: Nariman Narimanov Stadium; Attendance: 100; Referee: Ingilab Mämmädov

4 March 2015 Quarterfinals 1st leg	Neftchi Baku	0 – 0	AZAL	Baku
17:00 AZT (UTC+4)	Aliyev (yellow card) 34'; Ramos (yellow card) 47'; Flavinho (yellow card) 82'	Summary	Kļava (yellow card) 49'; Igbekoyi (yellow card) 65'	Stadium: Bakcell Arena; Attendance: 1,000; Referee: Ingilab Mämmädov

13 March 2015 Quarterfinals 2nd leg	AZAL	0 – 1 (0 – 1 agg.)	Neftchi Baku	Baku
15:00 AZT (UTC+4)	Kutsenko (yellow card) 26'	Summary	Wobay 19'; S.Masimov (yellow card) 25'; Ramos (yellow card) 45'; M.Isayev (yellow card) 47'; Yunuszade (yellow card) 63'	Stadium: AZAL Arena; Attendance: 400; Referee: Ingilab Mämmädov

== Squad statistics ==
As of Match played 28 May 2015

=== Appearances and goals ===
No.	Pos	Nat	Player	Total		Premier League		Azerbaijan Cup	
No.	Pos	Nat	Player	Apps	Goals	Apps	Goals	Apps	Goals
1	GK	(Azerbaijan) AZE	Ruslan Majidov	9	0	9	0	0	0
3	DF	(Spain) ESP	Juanfran	23	0	18+4	0	0+1	0
4	DF	(Georgia (country)) GEO	Lasha Kasradze	35	1	26+6	0	2+1	1
5	DF	(Azerbaijan) AZE	Karim Diniyev	31	2	19+10	2	1+1	0
6	FW	(Brazil) BRA	Eduardo	15	2	12+2	2	1	0
7	MF	(Azerbaijan) AZE	Tamkin Khalilzade	25	0	8+15	0	1+1	0
8	MF	(Azerbaijan) AZE	Seymur Asadov	23	1	18+2	1	3	0
9	DF	(Azerbaijan) AZE	Aydin Gasimov	14	1	2+9	1	0+3	0
10	MF	(Azerbaijan) AZE	Nijat Gurbanov	17	2	2+13	2	1+1	0
12	MF	(Honduras) HON	Luis Ramos	9	0	8+1	0	0	0
13	MF	(Azerbaijan) AZE	Shahriyar Rahimov	22	0	20+1	0	1	0
15	DF	(Latvia) LAT	Oskars Kļava	31	1	28	1	3	0
16	GK	(Moldova) MDA	Stanislav Namașco	21	0	17+1	0	3	0
17	MF	(Nigeria) NGR	Victor Igbekoyi	24	2	17+5	2	2	0
18	DF	(Azerbaijan) AZE	Orkhan Lalayev	22	0	16+5	0	1	0
20	FW	(Democratic Republic of the Congo) COD	Freddy Mombongo-Dues	31	14	28	13	3	1
21	DF	(Azerbaijan) AZE	Novruz Mammadov	24	1	19+2	1	3	0
22	DF	(Azerbaijan) AZE	Eltun Yagublu	13	0	13	0	0	0
23	DF	(Azerbaijan) AZE	Aleksandr Shemonayev	11	0	8+1	0	2	0
25	MF	(Ukraine) UKR	Valeriy Kutsenko	16	2	14	2	2	0
27	MF	(Azerbaijan) AZE	Rashad Abdullayev	31	7	27+1	7	3	0
33	MF	(Azerbaijan) AZE	Kamal Mirzäyev	2	0	0+2	0	0	0
85	GK	(Azerbaijan) AZE	Kamal Bayramov	6	0	6	0	0	0
Players who appeared for AZAL no longer at the club:
10	MF	(Bulgaria) BUL	Tomi Kostadinov	14	3	9+4	3	1	0
11	FW	(Colombia) COL	John Córdoba	8	0	6+2	0	0	0
14	MF	(Azerbaijan) AZE	Asif Mirili	2	0	1+1	0	0	0
23	DF	(Azerbaijan) AZE	Tural Narimanov	1	0	1	0	0	0

=== Goal scorers ===
Place	Position	Nation	Number	Name	Premier League	Azerbaijan Cup	Total
1	FW	(Democratic Republic of the Congo)	20	Freddy Mombongo-Dues	13	1	14
2	MF	(Azerbaijan)	27	Rashad Abdullayev	7	0	7
3	MF	(Bulgaria)	10	Tomi Kostadinov	3	0	3
4	DF	(Azerbaijan)	5	Karim Diniyev	2	0	2
4	FW	(Brazil)	6	Eduardo	2	0	2
4	MF	(Nigeria)	17	Victor Igbekoyi	2	0	2
4	MF	(Ukraine)	25	Valeriy Kutsenko	2	0	2
4	FW	(Azerbaijan)	10	Nijat Gurbanov	2	0	2
9	DF	(Azerbaijan)	21	Novruz Mammadov	1	0	1
9	DF	(Latvia)	15	Oskars Kļava	1	0	1
9	DF	(Azerbaijan)	9	Aydin Gasimov	1	0	1
9	MF	(Azerbaijan)	8	Seymur Asadov	1	0	1
9	DF	(Georgia (country))	4	Lasha Kasradze	0	1	1
				TOTALS	37	2	39

=== Disciplinary record ===
Number	Nation	Position	Name	Premier League		Azerbaijan Cup		Total	
Number	Nation	Position	Name	Yellow card	Red card	Yellow card	Red card	Yellow card	Red card
1	(Azerbaijan)	GK	Ruslan Majidov	1	1	0	0	1	1
3	(Spain)	DF	Juanfran	4	0	0	1	4	1
4	(Georgia (country))	DF	Lasha Kasradze	3	0	0	0	3	0
5	(Azerbaijan)	DF	Karim Diniyev	4	0	0	0	4	0
6	(Brazil)	FW	Eduardo	6	1	1	0	7	1
7	(Azerbaijan)	MF	Tamkin Khalilzade	2	0	0	0	2	0
8	(Azerbaijan)	MF	Seymur Asadov	6	0	0	0	6	0
9	(Azerbaijan)	DF	Aydin Gasimov	1	0	0	0	1	0
10	(Bulgaria)	MF	Tomi Kostadinov	1	0	0	0	1	0
10	(Azerbaijan)	MF	Nijat Gurbanov	3	0	0	0	3	0
11	(Colombia)	FW	John Córdoba	2	0	0	0	2	0
12	(Honduras)	MF	Luis Ramos	4	1	0	0	4	1
13	(Azerbaijan)	MF	Shahriyar Rahimov	7	1	1	0	8	1
15	(Latvia)	DF	Oskars Kļava	3	0	1	0	4	0
16	(Moldova)	GK	Stanislav Namașco	1	0	0	0	1	0
17	(Nigeria)	MF	Victor Igbekoyi	5	1	1	0	6	1
18	(Azerbaijan)	MF	Orkhan Lalayev	7	1	0	0	7	1
20	(Democratic Republic of the Congo)	FW	Freddy Mombongo-Dues	4	0	0	0	4	0
21	(Azerbaijan)	DF	Novruz Mammadov	5	0	0	0	5	0
22	(Azerbaijan)	DF	Eltun Yagublu	4	0	0	0	4	0
23	(Azerbaijan)	DF	Aleksandr Shemonayev	3	0	0	0	3	0
25	(Ukraine)	MF	Valeriy Kutsenko	3	0	1	0	4	0
27	(Azerbaijan)	MF	Rashad Abdullayev	1	1	0	0	1	1
85	(Azerbaijan)	GK	Kamal Bayramov	2	0	0	0	2	0
			TOTALS	82	7	5	1	87	8

== Notes ==
- Qarabağ have played their home games at the Tofiq Bahramov Stadium since 1993 due to the ongoing situation in Quzanlı.
- Araz-Naxçıvan were excluded from the Azerbaijan Premier League on 17 November 2014, with all their results being annulled.
