= 2013–14 AZAL PFC season =

AZAL
2013–14 season
- President: Zaur Akhundov
- Manager: Vagif Sadygov till 16 March 2014; Tarlan Ahmadov from 17 March 2014
- Stadium: AZAL Arena
- Premier League: 8th
- Azerbaijan Cup: Second Round vs Qarabağ
- Top goalscorer: League: Will John (8); All: Will John (8)
- Highest home attendance: 2,500 vs Khazar Lankaran; 22 September 2013
- Lowest home attendance: 200 vs Sumgayit; 23 August 2013; Inter Baku; 26 October 2013; Ravan Baku; 8 December 2013
- Average home league attendance: 661
Home colours	Away colours	Third colours

The AZAL 2013–14 season was AZAL's ninth Azerbaijan Premier League season, in which they finished 8th in the League. They also participated in the Azerbaijan Cup, where they were defeated in the Second Round by Qarabağ. AZAL started the season under the management of Vagif Sadygov, but he was sacked on 16 March 2014 following their defeat to Neftchi Baku, and replaced the following day by former Neftchi Assistant Tarlan Ahmadov.

== Squad ==
As of 10 January 2014

Note: Flags indicate national team as defined under FIFA eligibility rules; some limited exceptions apply. Players may hold more than one non-FIFA nationality.

No.	Pos.	Nation	Player
1	GK	AZE	Ruslan Majidov
2	DF	ESP	Juanfran
3	DF	AZE	Aleksandr Shemonayev
4	DF	BRA	Aílton Júnior
5	MF	AZE	Murad Agayev
7	MF	AZE	Javid Tagiyev
8	MF	AZE	Garib Ibrahimov
9	MF	AZE	Orkhan Hasanov
10	MF	USA	Will John
12	GK	AZE	Jahangir Hasanzade (Captain)
14	MF	AZE	Habil Nurəhmədov
15	DF	LAT	Oskars Kļava
16	GK	AZE	Elchin Sadigov
17	MF	NGR	Victor Igbekoyi

No.	Pos.	Nation	Player
18	MF	SLE	Samuel Barlay
19	MF	AZE	Orkhan Safiyaroglu
20	DF	SRB	Branislav Arsenijević
21	FW	AZE	Rey Mammadbayli
22	FW	TJK	Akhtam Khamroqulov
23	DF	AZE	Tural Narimanov
26	DF	AZE	Karim Diniyev
27	MF	AZE	Rashad Abdullayev
28	DF	AZE	Emin Jafarguliyev
31	MF	AZE	Shahriyar Rahimov
32	DF	GEO	Lasha Kasradze
89	FW	BIH	Nedo Turković
—	GK	AZE	Elmaddin Mammadov

=== Out on loan ===
Note: Flags indicate national team as defined under FIFA eligibility rules; some limited exceptions apply. Players may hold more than one non-FIFA nationality.

No. / Pos. / Nation / Player; — / MF / AZE / Elgun Abbasli (at Araz)	No. / Pos. / Nation / Player

== Transfers ==
=== Summer ===
In: Note: Flags indicate national team as defined under FIFA eligibility rules; some limited exceptions apply. Players may hold more than one non-FIFA nationality.

No.	Pos.	Nation	Player
3	DF	AZE	Aleksandr Shemonayev (from (Azerbaijan) Simurq)
5	MF	AZE	Murad Agayev (from (Azerbaijan) Sumgayit)
8	MF	AZE	Garib Ibrahimov (from (Azerbaijan) Simurq)
16	FW	SWE	Freddy Borg (from (Germany) SV Darmstadt 98)
18	MF	SLE	Samuel Barlay (from (Azerbaijan) Ravan Baku)
21	FW	AZE	Rey Mammadbayli (from (Azerbaijan) Gabala)
27	GK	AZE	Elmaddin Mammadov (from Youth Team)
28	DF	AZE	Emin Jafarguliyev (from (Azerbaijan) Sumgayit)
30	FW	UKR	Yuriy Fomenko (from (Azerbaijan) Inter Baku)
31	MF	AZE	Shahriyar Rahimov (from (Azerbaijan) Ravan Baku)

Out: Note: Flags indicate national team as defined under FIFA eligibility rules; some limited exceptions apply. Players may hold more than one non-FIFA nationality.

No.	Pos.	Nation	Player
1	GK	AZE	Amil Agajanov (to (Azerbaijan) Simurq)
3	DF	AZE	Nduka Usim (to (Turkey) Tavşanlı Linyitspor)
6	MF	AZE	Tagim Novruzov (to (Azerbaijan) Simurq)
8	MF	TKM	Elman Tagayew (to (Turkmenistan) Aşgabat)
9	FW	AZE	Elshan Mammadov
10	MF	AZE	Tarlan Khalilov (to (Azerbaijan) Shusha)
11	MF	MAR	Zouhir Benouahi (to (Azerbaijan) Khazar Lankaran)
16	FW	BRA	Nildo (to (Azerbaijan) Khazar Lankaran)
19	MF	AZE	Orkhan Safiyaroglu (to (Azerbaijan) Simurq)
24	DF	UKR	Ruslan Zubkov
37	FW	LTU	Andrius Velička (to (Lithuania) Žalgiris Vilnius)
77	DF	AZE	Saşa Yunisoğlu (to (Azerbaijan) Sumgayit)

=== Winter ===
In: Note: Flags indicate national team as defined under FIFA eligibility rules; some limited exceptions apply. Players may hold more than one non-FIFA nationality.

No.	Pos.	Nation	Player
16	GK	AZE	Elchin Sadigov (from (Azerbaijan) Sumgayit)
19	MF	AZE	Orkhan Safiyaroglu (from (Azerbaijan) Simurq)
22	FW	TJK	Akhtam Khamroqulov (from (Tajikistan) Regar-TadAZ).
26	DF	AZE	Karim Diniyev (from (Azerbaijan) Neftchi Baku)
27	MF	AZE	Rashad Abdullayev (from (Azerbaijan) Baku, previously on loan Ravan Baku)
32	DF	GEO	Lasha Kasradze (from (Georgia (country)) WIT Georgia)
89	FW	BIH	Nedo Turković (from (Kazakhstan) Akzhayik)

Out: Note: Flags indicate national team as defined under FIFA eligibility rules; some limited exceptions apply. Players may hold more than one non-FIFA nationality.

No.	Pos.	Nation	Player
16	FW	SWE	Freddy Borg (to (Sweden) Trelleborgs FF)
22	MF	AZE	Ruslan Tagizade (to (Azerbaijan) Gabala)
30	FW	UKR	Yuriy Fomenko
32	MF	SRB	Vladimir Bogdanović

== Competitions ==
=== Friendlies ===
30 June 2013	AZAL (Azerbaijan)	3 - 0	(Azerbaijan) Ravan Baku	Baku, Azerbaijan
10:00 AZT (UTC+4)	Bogdanović 12'; Igbekoyi 65'; F. Guliyev 76'			Stadium: AZAL Arena

6 July 2013	AZAL (Azerbaijan)	0 - 0	(Azerbaijan) Sumgayit	Sumgayit, Azerbaijan
19:00 AZT (UTC+4)				Stadium: Mehdi Huseynzade Stadium

12 July 2013	AZAL (Azerbaijan)	9 - 1	(Azerbaijan) FC Shusha	Baku, Azerbaijan
10:00 AZT (UTC+4)				Stadium: AZAL Arena

14 July 2013	AZAL (Azerbaijan)	1 - 0	(Azerbaijan) Ravan Baku	Baku, Azerbaijan
19:00 AZT (UTC+4)	Nyang 49'			Stadium: Bayil Arena

17 July 2013	AZAL (Azerbaijan)	2 - 0	(Azerbaijan) FK Neftchala	Baku, Azerbaijan
10:00 AZT (UTC+4)	Kļava 21'; Savankulov 85'			Stadium: AZAL Arena

19 July 2013	AZAL (Azerbaijan)	0 - 1	(Azerbaijan) FK Qaradağ	Baku, Azerbaijan
19:00 AZT (UTC+4)				Stadium: AZAL Arena

28 July 2013	AZAL (Azerbaijan)	2 - 1	(Azerbaijan) FK Qaradağ	Baku, Azerbaijan
19:00 AZT (UTC+4)	Fomenko; John			Stadium: AZAL Arena

January 2014	AZAL	3 - 0	Qaradağ	Baku, Azerbaijan
AZT (UTC+4)		[ Summary]

January 2014	AZAL	v	Shusha	Baku, Azerbaijan
AZT (UTC+4)		[ Summary]

18 January 2014	AZAL	1 - 2	Sumgayit	Baku, Azerbaijan
AZT (UTC+4)		[ Summary]

22 January 2014	AZAL	2 - 0	Araz-Naxçıvan	Baku, Azerbaijan
AZT (UTC+4)	Igbekoyi; Turkovic	Summary

24 January 2014	AZAL	6 - 0	Ağsu	Baku, Azerbaijan
AZT (UTC+4)	Goal	Summary

=== Azerbaijan Premier League ===
==== Results summary ====
Overall								Home						Away					
Pld	W	D	L	GF	GA	GD	Pts	W	D	L	GF	GA	GD	W	D	L	GF	GA	GD
36	6	13	17	29	49	−20	31	4	6	8	17	26	−9	2	7	9	12	23	−11

Last updated: 19 May 2014.
Source: Soccerway

==== Results by round ====
Round	1	2	3	4	5	6	7	8	9	10	11	12	13	14	15	16	17	18	19	20	21	22	23	24	25	26	27	28	29	30	31	32	33	34	35	36
Ground	A	H	A	H	A	H	H	A	H	A	H	A	H	A	A	H	A	H	A	H	A	H	H	A	H	A	H	A	H	A	A	H	A	H	A	H
Result	L	W	W	W	W	L	L	D	D	D	L	D	D	L	D	W	L	W	L	D	L	L	D	L	L	L	L	L	L	D	D	D	D	D	L	L
Position	10	5	4	3	1	4	4	5	4	4	5	6	6	7	7	6	7	7	7	8	8	8	8	8	8	8	8	8	8	8	8	8	8	8	8	8

Source: Soccerway
A = Away; H = Home; W = Win; D = Draw; L = Loss

==== Results ====
3 August 2013 1	Neftchi Baku	4 – 1	AZAL	Baku
20:00 AZST (UTC+5)	Nasimov 9'; Flavinho 29'; R. Sadiqov 36'; E. Mehdiyev 90+2'	Summary	John 58'	Stadium: Bakcell Arena; Attendance: 2,000; Referee: Vusal Äliyev

9 August 2013 2	AZAL	1 – 0	Baku	Baku
19:00 AZST (UTC+5)	Igbekoyi 27'	Summary	Česnauskis (yellow card) 36' (yellow-red card) 45+1'	Stadium: AZAL Arena; Attendance: 1,000; Referee: Rahim Häsänov

18 August 2013 3	Inter Baku	1 – 2	AZAL	Baku
20:00 AZST (UTC+5)	Amirjanov 30'	Summary	Igbekoyi 42', 67'	Stadium: Shafa Stadium; Attendance: 300; Referee: Rauf Jabbarov

23 August 2013 4	AZAL	1 – 0	Sumgayit	Baku
19:00 AZST (UTC+5)	John 45+1'	Summary	K.Diniyev (yellow card) 12' (yellow-red card) 54'; Mirzabekov (red card) 73'	Stadium: AZAL Arena; Attendance: 200; Referee: Vusal Äliyev

1 September 2013 5	Qarabağ	0 – 1	AZAL	Baku
20:00 AZST (UTC+5)		Summary	Arsenijević 21'	Stadium: Tofiq Bahramov Stadium^{1} Attendance: 1,500; Referee: Ramil Diniyev

15 September 2013 6	AZAL	1 – 2	Gabala	Baku
18:00 AZST (UTC+5)	John 3'	Summary	Mendy 8'; Subotić 32'; Guluzade (yellow card) (yellow-red card)	Stadium: AZAL Arena; Attendance: 1,500; Referee: Aliyar Ağayev

22 September 2013 7	AZAL	1 – 3	Khazar Lankaran	Baku
19:00 AZST (UTC+5)	Tagiyev 10'; Kļava (red card) 45+1'	Summary	Sacconi 3'; Nildo 68', 76'	Stadium: AZAL Arena; Attendance: 2,500; Referee: Vusal Äliyev

29 September 2013 8	Ravan Baku	0 – 0	AZAL	Baku
19:00 AZST (UTC+5)		Summary		Stadium: Bayil Stadium; Attendance: 300; Referee: Rauf Jabbarov

4 October 2013 9	AZAL	1 – 1	Simurq	Baku
18:00 AZST (UTC+5)	Ibrahimov 24'	Summary	R.Eyyubov 52' (pen.)	Stadium: AZAL Arena; Attendance: 1,000; Referee: Ramil Diniyev

20 October 2013 10	Baku	2 – 2	AZAL	Baku
16:00 AZST (UTC+5)	Aliyev 11', 22'	Summary	Arsenijević 29'; Fomenko 70'	Stadium: Tofik Bakhramov Stadium; Attendance: 850; Referee: Rahim Häsänov

26 October 2013 11	AZAL	0 – 2	Inter Baku	Baku
17:00 AZST (UTC+5)		Summary	Tskhadadze 67'; Mammadov 82'	Stadium: AZAL Arena; Attendance: 200; Referee: Orkhan Mämmädov

3 November 2013 12	Sumgayit	0 – 0	AZAL	Sumgayit
15:00 AZT (UTC+4)		Summary		Stadium: Mehdi Huseynzade Stadium; Attendance: 1,000; Referee: Fariz Yusifov

9 November 2013 13	AZAL	1 – 1	Qarabağ	Baku
17:00 AZT (UTC+4)	Igbekoyi 33'	Summary	Medvedev 73'	Stadium: AZAL Arena; Attendance: 500; Referee: Rahim Häsänov

22 November 2013 14	Gabala	1 – 0	AZAL	Qabala
14:20 AZST (UTC+5)	Leonardo 72'	Summary		Stadium: Gabala City Stadium; Attendance: 1,000; Referee: Fariz Yusifov

30 November 2013 15	Khazar Lankaran	1 – 1	AZAL	Lankaran
17:00 AZT (UTC+4)	Abdullayev 36'; Ramazanov (red card) 85'	Summary	Barlay 22'; Arsenijević (yellow card) 10' (yellow-red card) 55'	Stadium: Lankaran City Stadium; Attendance: 4,500; Referee: Rauf Jabbarov

8 December 2013 16	AZAL	2 – 1	Ravan Baku	Baku
16:00 AZT (UTC+4)	Rahimov 90', 90+4'	Summary	Akhundov 50'	Stadium: AZAL Arena; Attendance: 200; Referee: Orkhan Mämmädov

14 December 2013 17	Simurq	3 – 0	AZAL	Zaqatala
17:00 AZT (UTC+4)	Ćeran 22'; Costin 45+1'; Poladov 90'	Summary		Stadium: Zaqatala City Stadium; Attendance: 2,000; Referee: Ramil Diniyev

20 December 2013 18	AZAL	2 – 1	Neftchi Baku	Baku
15:00 AZT (UTC+4)	John 19'; Shemonayev 88'	Summary	Sadiqov 59'; Shukurov (yellow card) 74' (yellow-red card) 80'; Yunuszade (yellow card) 27' (red card) 83'	Stadium: AZAL Arena; Attendance: 500; Referee: Orkhan Mämmädov

2 February 2014 19	Inter Baku	2 – 1	AZAL	Baku
17:00 AZT (UTC+4)	A.Abatsiyev 6'; Amirjanov 78'	Summary	N.Turković 49'	Stadium: Shafa Stadium; Attendance: 200; Referee: Fariz Yusifov

8 February 2014 20	AZAL	2 – 2	Sumgayit	Baku
15:00 AZT (UTC+4)	N.Turković 45'; Igbekoyi 80'	[ Summary]	Jahangirov 60'; Fardjad-Azad 89' (pen.)	Stadium: AZAL Arena; Attendance: 300; Referee: Elvin Äsgärov

15 February 2014 21	Qarabağ	2 – 1	AZAL	Baku
17:00 AZT (UTC+4)	Narimanov 33' (o.g.); Chumbinho 47'	Summary	Igbekoyi 66'	Stadium: Bakcell Arena^{2} Attendance: 1,500; Referee: Orkhan Mämmädov

19 February 2014 22	AZAL	1 – 2	Gabala	Baku
15:00 AZT (UTC+4)	N.Turković 39' (pen.)	Summary	Subotić 44'; Rahimov 71' (o.g.)	Stadium: AZAL Arena; Attendance: 500; Referee: Rahim Häsänov

22 February 2014 23	AZAL	2 – 2	Khazar Lankaran	Baku
17:00 AZT (UTC+4)	N.Turković 84'; Shemonayev (yellow card) 67' (yellow-red card) 90+1'; John 90+5' (pen.)	Summary	Nildo 22'; Abdullayev 48'	Stadium: AZAL Arena; Attendance: 2,000; Referee: Aliyar Ağayev

28 February 2014 24	Ravan Baku	1 – 0	AZAL	Baku
19:00 AZT (UTC+4)	Maharramov (yellow card) 20' (yellow-red card) 46'; Adamović 76'	Summary	Junior (red card) 75'; Igbekoyi (yellow card) 71' (yellow-red card) 85'	Stadium: Bayil Stadium; Attendance: 800; Referee: Rahim Häsänov

8 March 2014 25	AZAL	0 – 2	Simurq	Baku
16:00 AZT (UTC+4)	Shemonayev (red card) 73'	Summary	Poljak 29'; Qirtimov (red card) 73'; Ćeran 87'	Stadium: AZAL Arena; Attendance: 400; Referee: Orkhan Mämmädov

16 March 2014 26	Neftchi Baku	2 – 1	AZAL	Baku
17:30 AZT (UTC+4)	Abdullayev 6', 44'	Summary	John 90+3' (pen.)	Stadium: Bakcell Arena; Attendance: 500; Referee: Rauf Jabbarov

23 March 2014 27	AZAL	1 – 2	Baku	Baku
16:00 AZT (UTC+4)	John 39'	Summary	Travner 30'; Aílton Júnior 47' (o.g.)	Stadium: AZAL Arena; Attendance: 300; Referee: Ramil Häsänov

28 March 2014 28	Sumgayit	2 – 1	AZAL	Sumqayit
15:00 AZT (UTC+4)	Kurbanov 21'; Pamuk 55'	Summary	Kasradze 7'	Stadium: Mehdi Huseynzade Stadium; Attendance: 900; Referee: Fariz Yusifov

5 April 2014 29	AZAL	0 – 2	Qarabağ	Baku
17:00 AZST (UTC+5)		Summary	Reynaldo 24'; Richard 59'	Stadium: AZAL Arena; Attendance: 800; Referee: Ramil Diniyev

12 April 2014 30	Gabala	0 – 0	AZAL	Qabala
15:00 AZST (UTC+5)		Summary		Stadium: Gabala City Stadium; Attendance: 500; Referee: Fariz Yusifov

20 April 2014 31	Khazar Lankaran	1 – 1	AZAL	Lankaran
18:00 AZST (UTC+5)	T.Sadio 9'	Summary	John 34'	Stadium: Lankaran City Stadium; Attendance: 1,200; Referee: Omar Paşayev

27 April 2014 32	AZAL	0 – 0	Ravan Baku	Baku
17:00 AZST (UTC+5)		Summary		Stadium: AZAL Arena; Attendance: 200; Referee: Rauf Jabbarov

2 May 2014 33	Simurq	0 – 0	AZAL	Zaqatala
18:00 AZST (UTC+5)		Summary		Stadium: Zaqatala City Stadium; Attendance: 1,000; Referee: Rahim Häsänov

7 May 2014 34	AZAL	0 – 0	Neftchi Baku	Baku
18:00 AZST (UTC+5)	K.Diniyev (yellow card) 37' (yellow-red card) 58'; Agayev (red card) 86'	Summary		Stadium: AZAL Arena; Attendance: 650; Referee: Fariz Yusifov

12 May 2014 35	Baku	1 – 0	AZAL	Baku
18:00 AZST (UTC+5)	Šolić 71'	Summary		Stadium: Tofik Bakhramov Stadium; Attendance: 500; Referee: Omar Paşayev

17 May 2014 36	AZAL	1 – 3	Inter Baku	Baku
17:00 AZST (UTC+5)	A.Qasımov 75'	Summary	S.Zargarov 2'; Madrigal 9', 84'	Stadium: AZAL Arena; Attendance: 400; Referee: Rauf Jabbarov

==== League table ====
Pos	Team	Pld	W	D	L	GF	GA	GD	Pts	Qualification or relegation
6	Khazar Lankaran	36	12	13	11	44	49	−5	49	
7	Simurq	36	11	13	12	35	28	+7	46	
8	AZAL	36	6	13	17	29	49	−20	31	
9	Sumgayit	36	5	10	21	27	61	−34	25	
10	Ravan Baku (R)	36	4	10	22	22	66	−44	22	Relegation to Azerbaijan First Division

Source: Azerbaijan Professional Football league
Rules for classification: 1) points; 2) goal difference; 3) number of goals scored.
(R) Relegated

=== Azerbaijan Cup ===
4 December 2013 Second Round	Qarabağ	1 – 0	AZAL	Baku
16:30 AZT (UTC+4)	Reynaldo 79'	Summary	Shemonayev (yellow card) 43' (yellow-red card) 64'	Stadium: Tofiq Bahramov Stadium^{1} Attendance: 200; Referee: Ramil Diniyev

== Squad statistics ==
As of Match played 17 May 2014

=== Appearances and goals ===
No.	Pos	Nat	Player	Total		Premier League		Azerbaijan Cup	
No.	Pos	Nat	Player	Apps	Goals	Apps	Goals	Apps	Goals
1	GK	(Azerbaijan) AZE	Ruslan Majidov	25	0	24+0	0	1+0	0
2	DF	(Spain) ESP	Juanfran	10	0	7+2	0	1+0	0
3	DF	(Azerbaijan) AZE	Aleksandr Shemonayev	30	1	27+2	1	1+0	0
4	DF	(Brazil) BRA	Aílton	29	0	27+1	0	1+0	0
5	MF	(Azerbaijan) AZE	Murad Agayev	13	0	2+11	0	0+0	0
6	MF	(Azerbaijan) AZE	Aydın Qasımov	2	1	2+0	1	0+0	0
7	MF	(Azerbaijan) AZE	Javid Tagiyev	27	1	18+8	1	0+1	0
8	MF	(Azerbaijan) AZE	Garib Ibrahimov	17	1	16	1	0+1	0
9	MF	(Azerbaijan) AZE	Orkhan Hasanov	3	0	1+2	0	0+0	0
10	MF	(United States) USA	Will John	36	8	34+1	8	1+0	0
12	GK	(Azerbaijan) AZE	Jahangir Hasanzade	12	0	12+0	0	0+0	0
15	DF	(Latvia) LAT	Oskars Kļava	33	0	32+0	0	1+0	0
16	GK	(Azerbaijan) AZE	Elchin Sadigov	1	0	0+1	0	0+0	0
17	MF	(Nigeria) NGR	Victor Igbekoyi	32	6	31+0	6	1+0	0
18	MF	(Sierra Leone) SLE	Samuel Barlay	25	1	17+7	1	1+0	0
19	MF	(Azerbaijan) AZE	Orkhan Safiyaroglu	4	0	1+3	0	0+0	0
20	DF	(Serbia) SRB	Branislav Arsenijević	31	2	30+0	2	1+0	0
21	FW	(Azerbaijan) AZE	Rey Mammadbayli	7	0	2+5	0	0+0	0
22	FW	(Tajikistan) TJK	Akhtam Khamroqulov	7	0	0+7	0	0+0	0
23	DF	(Azerbaijan) AZE	Tural Narimanov	22	0	21+1	0	0+0	0
25	MF	(Azerbaijan) AZE	Äbülfäz Hüseynli	1	0	0+1	0	0+0	0
26	DF	(Azerbaijan) AZE	Karim Diniyev	9	0	8+1	0	0+0	0
27	MF	(Azerbaijan) AZE	Rashad Abdullayev	14	0	9+5	0	0+0	0
28	DF	(Azerbaijan) AZE	Emin Jafarguliyev	7	0	1+6	0	0+0	0
31	MF	(Azerbaijan) AZE	Shahriyar Rahimov	26	2	20+5	2	1+0	0
32	DF	(Georgia (country)) GEO	Lasha Kasradze	13	1	12+1	1	0+0	0
89	FW	(Bosnia and Herzegovina) BIH	Nedo Turković	17	4	16+1	4	0+0	0
Players who appeared for Ravan Baku no longer at the club:
16	FW	(Sweden) SWE	Freddy Borg	6	0	0+6	0	0+0	0
22	MF	(Azerbaijan) AZE	Ruslan Tagizade	14	0	10+3	0	1+0	0
30	FW	(Ukraine) UKR	Yuriy Fomenko	13	1	5+7	1	0+1	0
32	DF	(Serbia) SRB	Vladimir Bogdanović	12	0	11+1	0	0+0	0

=== Goal scorers ===
Place	Position	Nation	Number	Name	Premier League	Azerbaijan Cup	Total
1	MF	(United States)	10	Will John	8	0	8
2	MF	(Nigeria)	17	Victor Igbekoyi	6	0	6
3	FW	(Bosnia and Herzegovina)	89	Nedo Turković	4	0	4
4	DF	(Serbia)	20	Branislav Arsenijević	2	0	2
4	MF	(Azerbaijan)	31	Shahriyar Rahimov	2	0	2
6	DF	(Azerbaijan)	7	Javid Tagiyev	1	0	1
6	MF	(Azerbaijan)	8	Garib Ibrahimov	1	0	1
6	FW	(Ukraine)	30	Yuriy Fomenko	1	0	1
6	FW	(Sierra Leone)	18	Samuel Barlay	1	0	1
6	DF	(Azerbaijan)	3	Aleksandr Shemonayev	1	0	1
6	DF	(Georgia (country))	32	Lasha Kasradze	1	0	1
6	MF	(Azerbaijan)	6	Aydın Qasımov	1	0	1
				TOTALS	29	0	29

=== Disciplinary record ===
Number	Nation	Position	Name	Premier League		Azerbaijan Cup		Total	
Number	Nation	Position	Name	Yellow card	Red card	Yellow card	Red card	Yellow card	Red card
1	(Azerbaijan)	GK	Ruslan Majidov	4	0	0	0	4	0
2	(Spain)	DF	Juanfran	2	0	0	0	2	0
3	(Azerbaijan)	DF	Aleksandr Shemonayev	16	2	2	1	18	3
4	(Brazil)	DF	Aílton	8	1	0	0	8	1
5	(Azerbaijan)	MF	Murad Agayev	0	1	0	0	0	1
7	(Azerbaijan)	MF	Javid Tagiyev	5	0	0	0	5	0
8	(Azerbaijan)	MF	Garib Ibrahimov	3	0	0	0	3	0
10	(United States)	MF	Will John	4	0	0	0	4	0
15	(Latvia)	DF	Oskars Kļava	10	1	0	0	10	1
17	(Nigeria)	MF	Victor Igbekoyi	10	1	0	0	10	1
18	(Sierra Leone)	MF	Samuel Barlay	8	0	1	0	9	0
20	(Serbia)	DF	Branislav Arsenijević	6	1	0	0	6	1
22	(Azerbaijan)	MF	Ruslan Tagizade	4	0	0	0	4	0
23	(Azerbaijan)	MF	Tural Narimanov	3	0	0	0	3	0
26	(Azerbaijan)	DF	Karim Diniyev	4	1	0	0	4	1
30	(Ukraine)	FW	Yuriy Fomenko	1	0	0	0	1	0
31	(Azerbaijan)	MF	Shahriyar Rahimov	10	0	0	0	10	0
32	(Serbia)	DF	Vladimir Bogdanović	5	0	0	0	5	0
32	(Georgia (country))	DF	Lasha Kasradze	3	0	0	0	3	0
89	(Bosnia and Herzegovina)	FW	Nedo Turković	4	0	0	0	4	0
			TOTALS	110	8	3	1	113	9
