= 2012–13 AZAL PFC season =

AZAL
2012–13 season
- Chairman: Zaur Akhundov
- Manager: Vagif Sadygov
- Stadium: AZAL Arena
- Premier League: 7th
- Azerbaijan Cup: Second Round vs Simurq
- Top goalscorer: League: Nildo (21); All: Nildo (21)
- Highest home attendance: 2,500 vs Ravan Baku; 11 August 2012
- Lowest home attendance: 200 vs Sumgayit; 25 November 2012; 200 vs Turan Tovuz; 15 December 2012; 200 vs Kəpəz; 23 February 2013; 200 vs Ravan Baku; 19 April 2013; 200 vs Sumgayit; 8 May 2013
- Average home league attendance: 785
Home colours	Away colours	Third colours

The AZAL 2012–13 season was AZAL's eighth Azerbaijan Premier League season and their first season with Vagif Sadygov as manager. They participated in the 2012–13 Azerbaijan Premier League, finishing 7th in the initial 22 game championship. They then went unbeaten, winning nine and drawing one, as the finished top of the Relegation Group with 57 points, 17 points clear of 8th placed Khazar Lankaran. They took part in the 2012–13 Azerbaijan Cup, which they were knocked out of at the second round stage by Simurq.

== Squad ==
As of 10 April 2013

Note: Flags indicate national team as defined under FIFA eligibility rules; some limited exceptions apply. Players may hold more than one non-FIFA nationality.

No.	Pos.	Nation	Player
1	GK	AZE	Amil Agajanov
2	DF	ESP	Juanfran
3	DF	AZE	Nduka Usim (Vice-captain)
4	DF	BRA	Aílton
6	MF	AZE	Tagim Novruzov
7	MF	AZE	Javid Tagiyev
9	FW	AZE	Elshan Mammadov
10	MF	AZE	Tarlan Khalilov
11	MF	MAR	Zouhir Benouahi
12	GK	AZE	Jahangir Hasanzade (Captain)
15	DF	LAT	Oskars Kļava
16	FW	BRA	Nildo
17	MF	NGR	Victor Igbekoyi

No.	Pos.	Nation	Player
19	MF	AZE	Orkhan Safiyaroglu
20	DF	SRB	Branislav Arsenijević
22	DF	AZE	Ruslan Tagizade
23	DF	AZE	Tural Narimanov
24	DF	UKR	Ruslan Zubkov
25	MF	AZE	Habil Nurəhmədov
27	GK	AZE	Ruslan Majidov
28	MF	USA	Will John
32	MF	SRB	Vladimir Bogdanović
37	MF	LTU	Andrius Velička
77	DF	AZE	Saşa Yunisoğlu
99	MF	AZE	Orkhan Hasanov

== Transfers ==
=== Summer ===
In: Note: Flags indicate national team as defined under FIFA eligibility rules; some limited exceptions apply. Players may hold more than one non-FIFA nationality.

No.	Pos.	Nation	Player
2	DF	ESP	Juanfran (from (Spain) La Nucía)
4	DF	BRA	Aílton ( (Hungary) Ferencvárosi)
6	MF	AZE	Tagim Novruzov (from (Azerbaijan) Ravan)
7	MF	AZE	Javid Tagiyev (from (Azerbaijan) Turan Tovuz)
8	MF	TKM	Elman Tagaýew (from (Turkmenistan) Altyn Asyr)
15	DF	LAT	Oskars Kļava (from (Latvia) Liepājas Metalurgs)
16	FW	BRA	Nildo (from (Poland) Górnik Leczna)
18	FW	AZE	Rahman Musayev (from (Azerbaijan) Qaradağ)
21	FW	AZE	Yasin Abbasov (from (Azerbaijan) Sumgayit)
22	DF	AZE	Ruslan Tagizade (from (Azerbaijan) Neftchi Baku)
24	DF	UKR	Ruslan Zubkov (from (Ukraine) Odesa)
27	GK	AZE	Ruslan Majidov (from (Azerbaijan) Sumgayit)
28	MF	MDA	Artur Pătraş ( (Romania) Politehnica Timișoara)
33	GK	AZE	Khayyam Hasanov (from (Azerbaijan) Shusha)
37	FW	LTU	Andrius Velička (from (Lithuania) Ekranas)
77	FW	AZE	Arif Isayev (from (Azerbaijan) Gabala)
99	MF	AZE	Orkhan Hasanov (from (Azerbaijan) Neftchi Baku)

Out: Note: Flags indicate national team as defined under FIFA eligibility rules; some limited exceptions apply. Players may hold more than one non-FIFA nationality.

No.	Pos.	Nation	Player
2	DF	MKD	Robert Petrov
6	DF	LTU	Mindaugas Daunoravičius (to (Lithuania) FK Nevėžis)
10	MF	RUS	Nugzar Kvirtiya (to (Azerbaijan) Turan Tovuz)
13	DF	AZE	Shahriyar Rahimov (loan return to (Azerbaijan) Inter Baku)
15	FW	MDA	Gheorghe Boghiu (to (Moldova) Milsami)
19	MF	AZE	Huseyn Akhundov (to (Azerbaijan) Ravan Baku)
20	MF	KOS	Mensur Limani (to (Albania) KF Tirana)
23	FW	BRA	Tales Schutz (to (Azerbaijan) Inter Baku)
24	DF	UKR	Ruslan Zubkov (loan to (Azerbaijan) Turan Tovuz)
88	MF	ALB	Ervin Bulku (to (Iran) Sepahan)

=== Winter ===
In: Note: Flags indicate national team as defined under FIFA eligibility rules; some limited exceptions apply. Players may hold more than one non-FIFA nationality.

No.	Pos.	Nation	Player
24	DF	UKR	Ruslan Zubkov (loan return from (Azerbaijan) Turan Tovuz)
25	MF	AZE	Habil Nurəhmədov (from (Azerbaijan) Khazar Lankaran)
28	MF	USA	Will John (from (Ukraine) Oleksandriya, previously on loan to (United States) Missouri Comets)
32	MF	SRB	Vladimir Bogdanović (from (Greece) Panetolikos)
77	DF	AZE	Saşa Yunisoğlu (from (Azerbaijan) Neftchi Baku)

Out: Note: Flags indicate national team as defined under FIFA eligibility rules; some limited exceptions apply. Players may hold more than one non-FIFA nationality.

No.	Pos.	Nation	Player
5	DF	AZE	Agil Nabiyev (to (Azerbaijan) Baku)
8	MF	TKM	Elman Tagaýew (to (Turkmenistan) Aşgabat)
14	DF	AZE	Sabuhi Hasanov
18	MF	AZE	Rahman Musayev
21	FW	AZE	Yasin Abbasov (to (Azerbaijan) Neftchala)
26	MF	AZE	Etibar Shahmardanov (to (Germany) Henstedt-Ulzburg)
28	MF	MDA	Artur Pătraş (to (Moldova) Politehnica Chişinău)
77	MF	AZE	Arif Isayev (to (Turkey) Denizlispor)

== Competitions ==
=== Friendlies ===
19 January 2013	AZAL (Azerbaijan)	1 - 3	(Ukraine) Volyn	Antalya, Turkey
17:00 AZT (UTC+4)	Mammadov 87'	Summary; Report	Lopes 29'; 41'; Iliev 76'

22 January 2013	AZAL (Azerbaijan)	1 - 1	(China) Dalian Aerbin	Antalya, Turkey
17:00 AZT (UTC+4)	Velička 57'		Hoarau 87'

29 January 2013	AZAL (Azerbaijan)	4 - 0	(Finland) Zenith Myllypuro	Antalya, Turkey
17:00 AZT (UTC+4)	Nildo 34'; Benouahi 54'; Bogdanović 78'; Igbekoyi 87'

1 February 2013	AZAL (Azerbaijan)	4 - 0	(North Macedonia) Teteks	Antalya, Turkey
14:00 AZT (UTC+4)	Benouahi 35', 55'; Novruzov 67'; Hasanov 90+3'

=== Azerbaijan Premier League ===
==== Results summary ====
Overall								Home						Away					
Pld	W	D	L	GF	GA	GD	Pts	W	D	L	GF	GA	GD	W	D	L	GF	GA	GD
22	7	8	7	32	25	+7	29	5	4	2	23	11	+12	2	4	5	9	14	−5

Last updated: 3 March 2013.
Source: Soccerway

==== Results by round ====
Round	1	2	3	4	5	6	7	8	9	10	11	12	13	14	15	16	17	18	19	20	21	22
Ground	A	H	A	H	H	A	H	A	A	H	A	A	H	A	A	H	A	H	H	A	H	H
Result	D	W	W	W	D	D	L	L	D	W	L	L	D	W	D	D	L	D	L	L	W	W
Position	2	2	2	1	2	2	3	5	4	3	6	7	7	6	7	7	7	7	7	8	8	7

Source: Soccerway
A = Away; H = Home; W = Win; D = Draw; L = Loss

==== Results ====
4 August 2012 1	Sumgayit	2 – 2	AZAL	Sumgayit
18:30 AZST (UTC+5)	Aliyev 44'; Fardjad-Azad 55'	Summary	Tagiyev 12'; Benouahi 67'	Stadium: Mehdi Huseynzade Stadium; Attendance: 2,400; Referee: Anar Salmanov

11 August 2012 2	AZAL	3 – 1	Ravan Baku	Baku
18:00 AZST (UTC+5)	Nildo 4'; Benouahi 68', 73'	Summary	Varea 76'	Stadium: AZAL Arena; Attendance: 2,500; Referee: Elchin Mammadov

18 August 2012 3	Kəpəz	0 – 2	AZAL	Ganja
18:00 AZST (UTC+5)		Summary	Nildo 30', 51'	Stadium: Ganja City Stadium; Attendance: 2,500; Referee: Vusal Aliyev

16 September 2012 5	AZAL	6 – 2	Qarabağ	Baku
18:30 AZST (UTC+5)	Arsenijević 13'; Nildo 19', 49', 59', 77'; Benouahi 43' (pen.)	Summary	Richard 81', 87'	Stadium: AZAL Arena; Attendance: 2,000; Referee: Aliyar Agayev

23 September 2012 6	AZAL	0 – 0	Inter Baku	Sumgayit
16:00 AZST (UTC+5)		Summary		Stadium: Mehdi Huseynzade Stadium; Attendance: 500; Referee: Anar Salmanov

29 September 2012 7	Gabala	0 – 0	AZAL	Qabala
16:00 AZST (UTC+5)		Summary		Stadium: Gabala City Stadium; Attendance: 500; Referee: Fariz Yusifov

3 October 2012 8	AZAL	0 – 2	Khazar Lankaran	Baku
18:30 AZST (UTC+5)		Summary	Scarlatache 41', 45'	Stadium: AZAL Arena; Attendance: 1,500; Referee: Aliyar Ağayev

20 October 2012 9	Turan Tovuz	1 – 0	AZAL	Tovuz
16:00 AZST (UTC+5)	Günlü 13'	Summary		Stadium: Tovuz City Stadium; Attendance: 3,000; Referee: Rahim Hasanov

26 October 2012 10	Simurq	1 – 1	AZAL	Zaqatala
18:00 AZST (UTC+5)	Sattarly 90+4'	Summary	R.Tagizade 29'	Stadium: Zaqatala City Stadium; Attendance: 3,500; Referee: Orkhan Mämmädov

30 October 2012 11	AZAL	2 – 1	Baku	Baku
19:00 AZST (UTC+5)	Igbekoyi 39'; Nildo 76'	Summary	Horvat 10'	Stadium: AZAL Arena; Attendance: 2,000; Referee: Rahim Hasanov

4 November 2012 12	Qarabağ	2 – 0	AZAL	Baku
15:00 AZT (UTC+4)	Muarem 59'; Javadov 65'	Summary		Stadium: Tofig Bakhramov Stadium; Attendance: 200; Referee: Aliyar Ağayev

19 November 2012 13	Ravan Baku	1 – 0	AZAL	Baku
16:00 AZT (UTC+4)	N.Gurbanov 84'	Summary		Stadium: Bayil Stadium; Attendance: 500; Referee: Elçin Mämmädov

25 November 2012 14	AZAL	1 – 1	Sumgayit	Baku
16:00 AZT (UTC+4)	Fardjad-Azad 3'	Summary	Benouahi 9' (pen.)	Stadium: AZAL Arena; Attendance: 200; Referee: Äliyar Ağayev

2/3 December 2012^{1} 15	Khazar Lankaran	1 – 2	AZAL	Lankaran
14:00 AZT (UTC+4)	Subašić 21'	Summary	Tagizade 11'; Benouahi 80'	Stadium: Lankaran City Stadium; Attendance: 2,000; Referee: Rahim Häsänov

9 December 2012 16	Inter Baku	0 – 0	AZAL	Baku
15:15AZT (UTC+4)		Summary		Stadium: Shafa Stadium; Attendance: 400; Referee: Fariz Yusifov

15 December 2012 17	AZAL	0 – 0	Turan Tovuz	Baku
15:00 AZT (UTC+4)		Summary		Stadium: AZAL Arena; Attendance: 200; Referee: Rahim Häsänov

22 December 2012 18	Neftchi Baku	4 – 2	AZAL	Baku
17:00 AZT (UTC+4)	Flavinho 18'; Wobay 36'; Sadiqov 68'; Imamverdiyev 89'	Summary	Benouahi 78'; Nildo 90' (pen.)	Stadium: Eighth Kilometer District Stadium; Attendance: 1000; Referee: Elchin Mammadov

9 February 2013 19	AZAL	1 – 1	Simurq	Baku
18:30 AZT (UTC+4)	Nildo 55'	Summary	Popović 2'; Ramaldanov (red card) 62'	Stadium: AZAL Arena; Attendance: 300; Referee: Anar Salmanov

13 February 2012 4	AZAL	1 – 2	Neftchi Baku	Baku
16:00 AZT (UTC+4)	Nildo 73'	Summary	Canales 28', 46'	Stadium: AZAL Stadium; Attendance: 500; Referee: Fariz Yusifov

16 February 2013 20	Baku	2 – 0	AZAL	Baku
14:00 AZT (UTC+4)	Nabiyev 42'; Horvat 80'	Summary		Stadium: Tofig Bakhramov Stadium; Attendance: 700; Referee: Vusal Äliyev

23 February 2013 21	AZAL	3 – 0	Kəpəz	Baku
18:00 AZT (UTC+4)	Tagiyev 27'; Safiyaroglu 37'; Igbekoyi 81'	Summary		Stadium: AZAL Arena; Attendance: 200; Referee: Rauf Jabbarov

3 March 2012 22	AZAL	6 – 1	Gabala	Baku
15:00 AZT (UTC+4)	Igbekoyi 19'; Tagiyev 47', 64'; Arsenijević 75'; Benouahi 80'; John 89'	Summary	Dabo 14'; Hüseynov (yellow card) 64' (yellow-red card) 83'	Stadium: AZAL Stadium; Attendance: 500; Referee: Rahim Häsänov

==== League table ====
Pos	Team	Pld	W	D	L	GF	GA	GD	Pts	Qualification
5	Gabala	22	9	5	8	26	27	−1	32	Qualification for championship group
6	Baku	22	6	12	4	24	15	+9	30	Qualification for championship group
7	AZAL	22	7	8	7	32	25	+7	29	Qualification for relegation group
8	Khazar Lankaran	22	7	7	8	32	27	+5	28	Qualification for relegation group
9	Turan	22	6	5	11	24	35	−11	23	Qualification for relegation group

Source: Association of Football Federations of Azerbaijan and Soccerway.com
Rules for classification: 1) points; 2) goal difference; 3) number of goals scored.
- Note 1: The match was originally played on 02.12.2012 but suspended in 54th minute at 1-1 due to fog. The remaining minutes were played the next day.

=== Azerbaijan Premier League Relegation Group ===
==== Results summary ====
Overall								Home						Away					
Pld	W	D	L	GF	GA	GD	Pts	W	D	L	GF	GA	GD	W	D	L	GF	GA	GD
10	9	1	0	25	8	+17	28	5	0	0	12	3	+9	4	1	0	13	5	+8

Last updated: 20 May 2013.
Source: Soccerway

==== Results by round ====
Round	1	2	3	4	5	6	7	8	9	10
Ground	A	A	H	A	H	H	A	H	A	H
Result	W	D	W	W	W	W	W	W	W	W
Position	7	7	7	7	7	7	7	7	7	7

Updated to match(es) played on 20 May 2013. Source: Soccerway
A = Away; H = Home; W = Win; D = Draw; L = Loss

==== Results ====
13 March 2013 23	Kəpəz	1 – 3	AZAL	Baku
15:00 AZT (UTC+4)	Guliyev 53'	Summary	Nildo 17', 29' (pen.); Igbekoyi 47'	Stadium: Dalga Arena; Attendance: 100; Referee: Elchin Mämmädov

30 March 2013 24	Khazar Lankaran	1 – 1	AZAL	Lankaran
18:00 AZT (UTC+4)	Silva 34'	Summary	Kļava 23'; Aílton (yellow card) 20' (yellow-red card) 72'	Stadium: Lankaran City Stadium; Attendance: 5,500; Referee: Ramil Diniyev

7 April 2013 25	AZAL	2 – 0	Turan Tovuz	Baku
17:30 AZST (UTC+5)	Nildo 16'; John 75'	Summary		Stadium: AZAL Stadium; Attendance: 500; Referee: Anar Salmanov

14 April 2013 26	Sumgayit	0 – 2	AZAL	Baku
17:00 AZST (UTC+5)		Summary	Tagizade 6'; Nildo 30'	Stadium: Bayil Stadium; Attendance: 200; Referee: Rauf Jabbarov

19 April 2013 27	AZAL	3 – 2	Ravan Baku	Baku
19:00 AZST (UTC+5)	Nildo 5'; John 58', 84'	Summary	Abbasov 68'; Kalonas 90+3'	Stadium: AZAL Stadium; Attendance: 200; Referee: Vusal Äliyev

28 April 2013 28	AZAL	2 – 0	Khazar Lankaran	Baku
18:00 AZST (UTC+5)	Igbekoyi 21'; Tagiyev 64'	Summary	Allahverdiyev (red card) 45'	Stadium: AZAL Arena; Attendance: 650; Referee: Rauf Jabbarov

3 May 2013 29	Turan Tovuz	0 – 2	AZAL	Baku
17:00 AZST (UTC+5)		Summary	Nildo 7', 27'; Tagiyev (yellow card) 28' (yellow-red card) 45+3'	Stadium: Dalga Arena; Attendance: 30; Referee: Rahim Häsänov

8 May 2013 30	AZAL	1 – 0	Sumgayit	Baku
18:00 AZST (UTC+5)	Nildo 70'	Summary		Stadium: AZAL Stadium; Attendance: 200; Referee: Elvin Äsgärov

14 May 2013 31	Ravan Baku	3 – 5	AZAL	Baku
17:30 AZST (UTC+5)	Igbekoyi 28' (o.g.); Adamović 44'; Abbasov 52'; Orlovschi (red card) 85'	Summary	Tagizade 12'; Igbekoyi 31'; Novruzov 63'; Nildo 66', 75' (pen.)	Stadium: Dalga Arena; Attendance: 400; Referee: Ramil Diniyev

18 May 2013 32	AZAL	4 – 0	Kəpəz	Baku
18:00 AZST (UTC+5)	Igbekoyi 6', 30'; Tagizade 30'; Kļava 70'	Summary		Stadium: AZAL Stadium; Attendance: 250; Referee: Ramil Ähmädov

==== Table ====
Pos	Team	Pld	W	D	L	GF	GA	GD	Pts	Qualification or relegation
7	AZAL	32	16	9	7	57	32	+25	57	
8	Khazar Lankaran	32	10	10	12	40	37	+3	40	Qualification for Europa League first qualifying round (Note: Khazar Lankaran qualified for the first qualifying round of the 2013–14 UEFA Europa League as winner of the 2012–13 Azerbaijan Cup.)
9	Ravan Baku	32	12	4	16	46	53	−7	40	
10	Sumgayit	32	9	8	15	31	49	−18	35	
11	Turan (R)	32	8	6	18	34	59	−25	30	Relegation to Azerbaijan First Division

Source: Association of Football Federations of Azerbaijan
Rules for classification: 1) points; 2) goal difference; 3) number of goals scored.
(R) Relegated

=== Azerbaijan Cup ===
28 November 2012 Second Round	AZAL	0 – 1	Simurq	Baku
17:45 AZT (UTC+4)		Summary	R.Poladov 26'	Stadium: AZAL Arena; Attendance: 1,400; Referee: Vusal Äliyev

== Squad statistics ==
As of 21 May 2013

=== Appearances and goals ===
No.	Pos	Nat	Player	Total		Premier League		Azerbaijan Cup	
No.	Pos	Nat	Player	Apps	Goals	Apps	Goals	Apps	Goals
1	GK	(Azerbaijan) AZE	Amil Agajanov	9	0	8+0	0	1+0	0
2	DF	(Spain) ESP	Juanfran	30	0	29+0	0	1+0	0
3	DF	(Azerbaijan) AZE	Nduka Usim	28	0	25+2	0	1+0	0
4	DF	(Brazil) BRA	Junior Ailton	28	0	27+0	0	1+0	0
6	MF	(Azerbaijan) AZE	Tagim Novruzov	29	1	27+1	1	1+0	0
7	MF	(Azerbaijan) AZE	Javid Tagiyev	26	5	17+8	5	1+0	0
9	FW	(Azerbaijan) AZE	Elshan Mammadov	3	0	0+3	0	0+0	0
10	MF	(Azerbaijan) AZE	Tarlan Khalilov	1	0	0+1	0	0+0	0
11	MF	(Morocco) MAR	Zouhir Benouahi	26	8	24+1	8	0+1	0
12	GK	(Azerbaijan) AZE	Jahangir Hasanzade	19	0	19+0	0	0+0	0
14	MF	(Azerbaijan) AZE	Orkhan Safiyaroglu	5	0	2+2	0	0+1	0
15	DF	(Latvia) LAT	Oskars Kļava	26	2	20+5	2	1+0	0
16	FW	(Brazil) BRA	Nildo	33	21	30+2	21	1+0	0
17	MF	(Nigeria) NGR	Victor Igbekoyi	30	8	28+1	8	1+0	0
19	MF	(Azerbaijan) AZE	Orkhan Safiyaroglu	7	1	5+2	1	0+0	0
20	DF	(Serbia) SRB	Branislav Arsenijević	32	2	30+1	2	1+0	0
22	DF	(Azerbaijan) AZE	Ruslan Tagizade	26	5	16+10	5	0+0	0
23	DF	(Azerbaijan) AZE	Tural Narimanov	11	0	6+5	0	0+0	0
27	GK	(Azerbaijan) AZE	Ruslan Majidov	6	0	5+1	0	0+0	0
28	MF	(United States) USA	Will John	6	4	3+3	4	0+0	0
32	MF	(Serbia) SRB	Vladimir Bogdanović	14	0	7+7	0	0+0	0
37	MF	(Lithuania) LTU	Andrius Velicka	15	0	4+11	0	0+0	0
77	DF	(Azerbaijan) AZE	Saşa Yunisoğlu	1	0	0+1	0	0+0	0
99	MF	(Azerbaijan) AZE	Orkhan Hasanov	14	0	7+7	0	0+0	0
Players who appeared for AZAL no longer at the club:
5	DF	(Azerbaijan) AZE	Agil Nabiyev	2	0	1+1	0	0+0	0
8	MF	(Turkmenistan) TKM	Elman Tagaýew	8	0	8+0	0	0+0	0
26	MF	(Azerbaijan) AZE	Etibar Shahmardanov	2	0	0+2	0	0+0	0
28	MF	(Moldova) MDA	Artur Pătraş	8	0	6+1	0	1+0	0
77	FW	(Azerbaijan) AZE	Arif Isayev	5	0	0+4	0	0+1	0

=== Goal scorers ===
Place	Position	Nation	Number	Name	Premier League	Azerbaijan Cup	Total
1	FW	(Brazil)	16	Nildo	21	0	21
2	MF	(Morocco)	11	Zouhir Benouahi	8	0	8
2	FW	(Nigeria)	17	Victor Igbekoyi	8	0	8
4	MF	(Azerbaijan)	7	Javid Tagiyev	5	0	5
5	MF	(United States)	28	Will John	4	0	4
5	DF	(Azerbaijan)	22	Ruslan Tagizade	4	0	4
7	DF	(Serbia)	20	Branislav Arsenijević	2	0	2
7	DF	(Latvia)	15	Oskars Kļava	2	0	2
9	MF	(Azerbaijan)	19	Orkhan Safiyaroglu	1	0	1
9	MF	(Azerbaijan)	6	Tagim Novruzov	1	0	1
				TOTALS	57	0	57

=== Disciplinary record ===
Number	Nation	Position	Name	Premier League		Azerbaijan Cup		Total	
Number	Nation	Position	Name	Yellow card	Red card	Yellow card	Red card	Yellow card	Red card
1	(Azerbaijan)	GK	Amil Agajanov	3	0	0	0	3	0
2	(Spain)	DF	Juanfran	5	0	0	0	5	0
3	(Azerbaijan)	DF	Nduka Usim	3	0	0	0	3	0
4	(Brazil)	DF	Junior Ailton	4	1	0	0	4	1
6	(Azerbaijan)	MF	Tagim Novruzov	11	0	0	0	11	0
7	(Azerbaijan)	MF	Javid Tagiyev	5	1	0	0	5	1
11	(Morocco)	MF	Zouhir Benouahi	4	0	0	0	4	0
12	(Azerbaijan)	GK	Jahangir Hasanzade	1	0	0	0	1	0
15	(Latvia)	DF	Oskars Kļava	9	0	1	0	10	0
17	(Nigeria)	FW	Victor Igbekoyi	6	0	0	0	6	0
20	(Serbia)	DF	Branislav Arsenijević	2	0	0	0	2	0
22	(Azerbaijan)	DF	Ruslan Tagizade	7	0	0	0	7	0
23	(Azerbaijan)	DF	Tural Narimanov	1	0	0	0	1	0
26	(Azerbaijan)	MF	Etibar Shahmardanov	1	0	0	0	1	0
28	(Moldova)	MF	Artur Pătraş	1	0	0	0	1	0
32	(Serbia)	MF	Vladimir Bogdanović	1	0	0	0	1	0
37	(Lithuania)	MF	Andrius Velička	1	0	0	0	1	0
99	(Azerbaijan)	MF	Orkhan Hasanov	1	0	0	0	1	0
			TOTALS	66	2	1	0	67	2
