= Emin Jafarguliyev =

Azerbaijani footballer (born 1990)

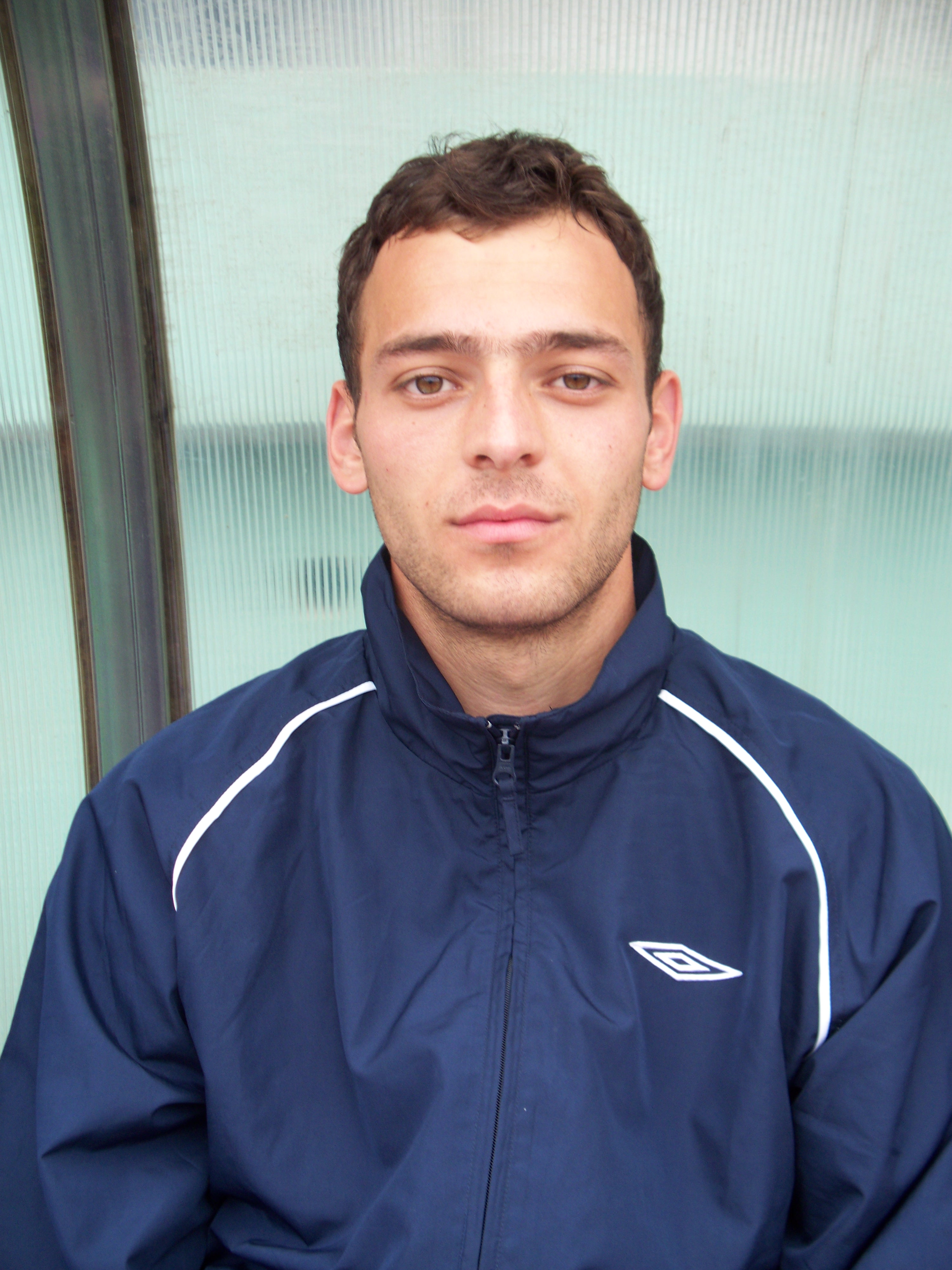

Personal information
- Full name: Emin Rzagulu oglu Jafarguliyev
- Date of birth: 17 June 1990 (age 36)
- Place of birth: Sumqayit, Soviet Union
- Height: 1.85 m (6 ft 1 in)
- Position: Defender

Team information
- Current team: Bine
- Number: 24

Youth career
- 2007–2008: Neftchi Baku

Senior career*
Years	Team	Apps	(Gls)
2008–2009	Neftchi Baku	6	(0)
2009–2010	FK Karvan	13	(0)
2010–2012	FC Baku	6	(1)
2011	→ MOIK Baku (loan)	10	(1)
2011–2012	→ Simurq (loan)	12	(0)
2012–2013	Sumgayit	23	(1)
2013–2014	AZAL	7	(0)
2014	Araz-Naxçıvan	9	(0)
2015	Shusha	2	(0)
2015–2017	AZAL	59	(0)
2017–	Bine	0	(0)

International career^{‡}
2008–	Azerbaijan	1	(0)
- * Club domestic league appearances and goals as of 4 September 2017 ‡ National team caps and goals as of 4 August 2013

Emin Jafarguliyev (Azerbaijani: Emin Cəfərquliyev; born 17 June 1990) is an Azerbaijani professional footballer who plays as a defender for Bine FK.

== Career ==
In June 2014, Jafarguliyev left AZAL, going on to join Jahangir Hasanzade at newly promoted Araz-Naxçıvan. Jafarguliyev was made a free agent when Araz-Naxçıvan folded and withdrew from the Azerbaijan Premier League on 17 November 2014.

== International career ==
Jafarguliyev made his debut for Azerbaijan on 15 October 2008 in their 2–1 away victory over Bahrain in Manama.

== Career statistics ==
As of match played 20 May 2016

Club statistics
Season	Club	League	League		Cup		Other		Total	
Season	Club	League	App	Goals	App	Goals	App	Goals	App	Goals
Azerbaijan			League		Azerbaijan Cup		Europe		Total	
2008–09	Neftchi Baku	Azerbaijan Premier League	6	0			-		6	0
2009–10	FK Karvan	Azerbaijan Premier League	13	0			-		13	0
2010–11	FK Baku	Azerbaijan Premier League	4	1	0	0	0	0	4	1
2010–11	MOIK Baku (loan)	Azerbaijan Premier League	10	1			-		10	1
2011–12	FK Baku	Azerbaijan Premier League	2	0	0	0	-		2	0
2011–12	Simurq (loan)	Azerbaijan Premier League	12	0	0	0	-		12	0
2012–13	Sumgayit	Azerbaijan Premier League	23	1	1	0	-		24	1
2013–14	AZAL	Azerbaijan Premier League	7	0	0	0	-		7	0
2014–15	Araz-Naxçıvan	Azerbaijan Premier League	9	0	0	0	-		7	0
2014–15	Shusha	Azerbaijan First Division	2	0	0	0	-		2	0
2015–16	AZAL	Azerbaijan Premier League	34	0	1	0	-		35	0
Total			122	3	2	0	0	0	124	3
