= Victor Igbekoyi =

Nigerian footballer

Personal information
- Full name: Victor Kayode Igbekoyi
- Date of birth: 1 September 1986 (age 40)
- Place of birth: Ondo City, Nigeria
- Height: 1.80 m (5 ft 11 in)
- Position: Midfielder

Youth career
- Hearts of Abuja
- Sunshine Stars

Senior career*
Years	Team	Apps	(Gls)
2006–2007	Turan Tovuz	22	(9)
2007–2008	Qarabağ	25	(6)
2009	Turan Tovuz	11	(7)
2009–2015	Shuvalan	156	(23)
2015–2018	Zira	82	(5)
2018–2019	North Carolina	19	(0)
- * Club domestic league appearances and goals as of 18 November 2019

Victor Kayode Igbekoyi (born 1 September 1986) is a Nigerian football midfielder. He formerly played for North Carolina FC in the USL Championship.

== Career ==
=== Club ===
On 27 June 2015, Igbekoyi became Zira's first foreign signing.

On 27 August 2018, Igbekoyi signed for North Carolina FC in the United Soccer League On 3 December 2019, North Carolina announced that they had declined the option on Igbekoyi's contract and therefore he'd become a free agent.

=== International ===
On 23 August 2012, Igbekoyi was selected in Sierra Leone's 19-man squad for their 2013 Africa Cup of Nations qualification match against Tunisia. Days later, Igbekoyi was withdrawn from the squad, before he was cleared to represent Sierra Leone in October 2012.

== Career statistics ==
=== Club ===
As of match played 13 October 2019

Appearances and goals by club, season and competition
Club	Season	League			National Cup		Continental		Other		Total	
Club	Season	Division	Apps	Goals	Apps	Goals	Apps	Goals	Apps	Goals	Apps	Goals
Turan-Tovuz	2006–07	Azerbaijan Premier League	22	9			–		–		22	9
Qarabağ	2007–08	Azerbaijan Premier League	22	5			-		-		22	5
Qarabağ	2008–09	Azerbaijan Premier League	3	1			-		-		3	1
Qarabağ	Total		25	6			-	-	-	-	25	6
Turan-Tovuz	2008–09	Azerbaijan Premier League	11	7			–		–		11	7
AZAL/Shuvalan	2009–10	Azerbaijan Premier League	20	3	4	0	-		-		20	3
AZAL/Shuvalan	2010–11	Azerbaijan Premier League	29	3	4	0	-		-		33	0
AZAL/Shuvalan	2011–12	Azerbaijan Premier League	24	1	3	0	2	1	-		29	2
AZAL/Shuvalan	2012–13	Azerbaijan Premier League	29	8	1	0	-		-		30	8
AZAL/Shuvalan	2013–14	Azerbaijan Premier League	31	6	1	0	-		-		32	6
AZAL/Shuvalan	2014–15	Azerbaijan Premier League	22	2	2	0	-		-		24	2
AZAL/Shuvalan	Total		155	23	15	0	2	1	-	-	172	24
Zira	2015–16	Azerbaijan Premier League	34	2	1	0	-		-		35	2
Zira	2016–17	Azerbaijan Premier League	23	2	0	0	-		-		23	2
Zira	2017–18	Azerbaijan Premier League	25	1	3	0	3	0	-		31	1
Zira	Total		82	5	4	0	3	0	-	-	89	5
North Carolina	2018	United Soccer League	6	0	0	0	–		–		6	0
North Carolina	2019	United Soccer League	13	0	0	0	–		–		13	0
North Carolina	Total		19	0	0	0	-	-	-	-	19	0
Career total			313	50	19+	0	5	1	-	-	337+	51
