= John Córdoba =

Colombian footballer (born 1987)

Personal information
- Full name: John Enrique Córdoba Córdoba
- Date of birth: 10 February 1987 (age 39)
- Place of birth: Atrato, Colombia
- Height: 1.82 m (6 ft 0 in)
- Position: Forward

Senior career*
Years	Team	Apps	(Gls)
2009–2010	ACD Lara	28	(14)
2010–2011	Deportivo Petare	30	(7)
2011–2012	Bolívar	11	(2)
2012	Zamora	11	(2)
2013	Trujillanos	34	(9)
2013–2014	Cúcuta Deportivo	10	(0)
2014	América Cali	15	(1)
2014	AZAL	9	(0)
2015	Suchitepéquez	16	(12)
2016	Cobán Imperial	11	(11)
- * Club domestic league appearances and goals as of 5 December 2016

John Enrique Córdoba Córdoba; (born 10 February 1987) is a Colombian footballer who last played for Cobán Imperial as a forward.

== Career ==
In July 2014, Córdoba moved to Azerbaijan Premier League team AZAL, signing a two-year contract, but left the club in the December of the same year.

== Career statistics ==
As of 8 December 2014

Club performance			League		Cup		Continental		Total	
Season	Club	League	Apps	Goals	Apps	Goals	Apps	Goals	Apps	Goals
2009–10	ACD Lara	Liga Venezolana	28	14			—		28	14
2010–11	Deportivo Petare	Liga Venezolana	30	7			1	0	31	7
2011–12	Bolívar	Liga de Fútbol Profesional Boliviano	11	2			—		11	2
2011–12	Zamora	Liga Venezolana	11	2			4	0	15	2
2012–13	Trujillanos	Liga Venezolana	34	9			—		34	9
2013	Cúcuta Deportivo	Categoría Primera A	10	0	1	0	—		11	0
2014	América S.A.	Categoría Primera B	15	1			—		15	1
2014–15	AZAL	Premier League	8	0	0	0	—		8	0
2015–16	Suchitepéquez	Liga Mayor "A"	3	2	0	0	—		3	2
Total	Colombia		25	1	1	0	—		26	1
Total	Venezuela		103	32			5	0	108	32
Total	Bolivia		11	2			—		11	2
Total	Azerbaijan		8	0	0	0	—		8	0
Total	Guatemala		3	2	0	0	—		3	2
Career total			150	37	1	0	5	0	156	37
