= Oskars Kļava =

Latvian footballer

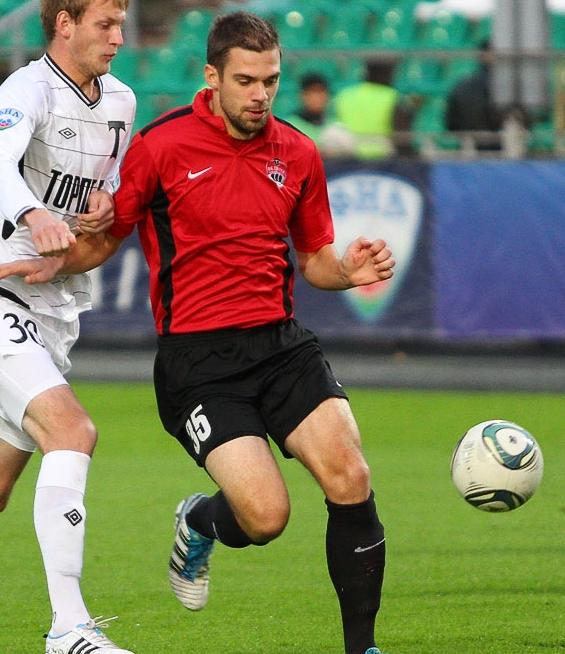
- Kļava with Khimki in 2011

Personal information
- Date of birth: 8 August 1983 (age 43)
- Place of birth: Liepāja, Latvian SSR, Soviet Union (now Republic of Latvia)
- Height: 1.88 m (6 ft 2 in)
- Position: Defender

Team information
- Current team: Grobiņa (manager)

Youth career
- Liepājas Metalurgs

Senior career*
| Years | Team | Apps | (Gls) |
| 2002–2010 | Liepājas Metalurgs | 189 | (7) |
| 2010–2012 | Anzhi Makhachkala | 11 | (0) |
| 2011 | → Khimki (loan) | 11 | (0) |
| 2012 | Liepājas Metalurgs | 14 | (2) |
| 2012–2015 | AZAL | 85 | (3) |
| 2015–2017 | Liepāja | 59 | (7) |

International career
| 2002–2004 | Latvia U21 | | |
| 2005–2013 | Latvia | 65 | (1) |

Managerial career
- 2022: Spartaks Jūrmala
- 2025–: Grobiņa
- * Club domestic league appearances and goals

Oskars Kļava (born 8 August 1983) is a Latvian professional football manager and former player who played as a defender. He is currently the manager of Latvian Higher League club Grobiņa. He was the general manager of Spartaks Jūrmala in 2022 and director of Liepāja Football School (Liepājas FS).

== Career ==
=== Club ===
Kļava was born in Liepāja. As a youth player, he played for his local club Liepājas Metalurgs, making his first-team debut in 2002. That year, he also made his European competitions debut and was sent off against the Austrian club FC Kärnten in a 2002–03 UEFA Cup qualifying round match, which Kärnten won 2–0 on 15 August 2002. With the number of appearances growing each season, Kļava played in Liepāja for nine seasons. He became a first eleven player in 2005. In January 2008, Kļava went on trial with Football League One side Leeds United in England. He left Metalurgs in 2010, having played 189 league matches, scoring seven goals.

In June 2010, Kļava went on trial with Russian Premier League club Anzhi Makhachkala and signed a three-year contract with them in August the same year. He was given the 83 jersey number and, despite his surname being Kļava, he had his name Oskars written on it. He made his league debut in the 17th round match against CSKA Moscow, coming on as a substitute on 15 August 2010. In his first season in Makhachkala, Kļava appeared in eleven Premier League matches, as well as twelve reserve team games, scoring one goal. He lost his place in the starting line-up after the arrival of the Brazilian veteran Roberto Carlos.

In August 2011, Kļava joined Russian First Division club FK Khimki on a half-year loan. Having played eleven matches there, he returned to Anzhi at the end of 2011. Before the start of the 2012 season ,Kļava rejoined his home-town club Liepājas Metalurgs playing in the Latvian Higher League. He scored two goals in fourteen league matches.

In July 2012, Kļava signed a contract with the Azerbaijan Premier League club AZAL. In his first two seasons with the club, Kļava appeared in 57 league matches and scored two goals.

=== International ===
Kļava was a member of Latvia U21 team. He made his international debut for the senior side in 2005 in a 1–1 draw against Thailand under that time national team's manager Jurijs Andrejevs, who had picked him up for a tournament in Bahrain. Kļava scored his first international goal in October 2007 against Iceland.

== Career statistics ==
=== Club ===
As of match played 4 November 2017

Appearances and goals by club, season and competition
| Club | Season | League | | | National cup (Note: Includes Russian Cup, Azerbaijan Cup, Latvian Cup) | | Continental | | Other | | Total | |
| Club | Season | Division | Apps | Goals | Apps | Goals | Apps | Goals | Apps | Goals | Apps | Goals |
|---|---|---|---|---|---|---|---|---|---|---|---|---|
| Liepājas Metalurgs | 2002 | Virsliga | 17 | 0 | | | 0 | 0 | — | | 17 | 0 |
| Liepājas Metalurgs | 2003 | Virslīga | 17 | 0 | | | 0 | 0 | — | | 17 | 0 |
| Liepājas Metalurgs | 2004 | Virslīga | 16 | 1 | | | 0 | 0 | — | | 16 | 1 |
| Liepājas Metalurgs | 2005 | Virslīga | 25 | 0 | | | 0 | 0 | — | | 25 | 0 |
| Liepājas Metalurgs | 2006 | Virslīga | 27 | 1 | | | 4 | 0 | — | | 31 | 1 |
| Liepājas Metalurgs | 2007 | Virslīga | 24 | 1 | | | 0 | 0 | — | | 24 | 1 |
| Liepājas Metalurgs | 2008 | Virslīga | 24 | 2 | | | 4 | 0 | — | | 28 | 2 |
| Liepājas Metalurgs | 2009 | Virslīga | 27 | 2 | | | 2 | 0 | — | | 29 | 2 |
| Liepājas Metalurgs | 2010 | Virslīga | 12 | 0 | | | 2 | 0 | — | | 14 | 0 |
| Liepājas Metalurgs | Total | | 189 | 7 | | | 12 | 0 | — | | 201 | 7 |
| Anzhi Makhachkala | 2010 | Russian Premier League | 10 | 0 | 0 | 0 | — | | — | | 10 | 0 |
| Anzhi Makhachkala | 2011–12 | Russian Premier League | 0 | 0 | 0 | 0 | — | | — | | 0 | 0 |
| Anzhi Makhachkala | Total | | 10 | 0 | 0 | 0 | — | | — | | 10 | 0 |
| Khimki (loan) | 2011–12 | Russian National League | 11 | 0 | 0 | 0 | — | | — | | 11 | 0 |
| AZAL | 2012–13 | Azerbaijan Premier League | 25 | 2 | 1 | 0 | — | | — | | 26 | 2 |
| AZAL | 2013–14 | Azerbaijan Premier League | 32 | 0 | 1 | 0 | — | | — | | 33 | 0 |
| AZAL | 2014–15 | Azerbaijan Premier League | 28 | 1 | 3 | 0 | — | | — | | 31 | 1 |
| AZAL | Total | | 85 | 3 | 5 | 0 | — | | — | | 90 | 3 |
| Liepāja | 2015 | Virslīga | 13 | 0 | 2 | 0 | — | | — | | 15 | 0 |
| Liepāja | 2016 | Virslīga | 24 | 6 | 1 | 0 | 2 | 0 | — | | 27 | 6 |
| Liepāja | 2017 | Virslīga | 22 | 1 | 4 | 0 | 2 | 0 | — | | 28 | 1 |
| Liepāja | Total | | 59 | 7 | 7 | 0 | 4 | 0 | — | | 70 | 7 |
| Career total | | | 354 | 17 | 12 | 0 | 16 | 0 | 0 | 0 | 382 | 17 |

=== International ===
Appearances and goals by national team and year
| National team | Year | Apps | Goals |
|---|---|---|---|
Latvia
| Latvia | 2005 | 3 | 0 |
| Latvia | 2006 | 5 | 0 |
| Latvia | 2007 | 11 | 1 |
| Latvia | 2008 | 7 | 0 |
| Latvia | 2009 | 8 | 0 |
| Latvia | 2010 | 8 | 0 |
| Latvia | 2011 | 7 | 0 |
| Latvia | 2012 | 8 | 0 |
| Latvia | 2013 | 4 | 0 |
| Total | | 61 | 1 |

Scores and results list Latvia's goal tally first, score column indicates score after each Kļava goal.

List of international goals scored by Oskars Kļava
| No. | Date | Venue | Opponent | Score | Result | Competition | Ref. |
|---|---|---|---|---|---|---|---|
| 1 | 13 October 2007 | Laugardalsvöllur, Reykjavík, Iceland | Iceland | 1–1 | 4–2 | UEFA Euro 2008 qualifying | |

== Honours ==
Liepājas Metalurgs

- Virsliga: 2005, 2009; runner-up 2003, 2004, 2006, 2007, 2008
- Latvian Cup 2006
- Baltic League: 2007

Latvia

- Baltic Cup: 2008, 2012
