= Freddy Mombongo-Dues =

Congolese footballer

Personal information
- Full name: Freddy Mombongo-Dues
- Date of birth: 30 August 1985 (age 41)
- Place of birth: Kinshasa, DR Congo
- Height: 1.85 m (6 ft 1 in)
- Position: Forward

Team information
- Current team: Patro Eisden Maasmechelen

Senior career*
Years	Team	Apps	(Gls)
2003–2004	1. FC Köln II	3	(0)
2004	Bonner SC		
2005–2006	Germania Dattenfeld		
2006–2007	VfL Rheinbach		
2007–2008	Wuppertaler SV Borussia	4	(0)
2008	→ Wuppertaler SV Borussia II	11	(3)
2008–2011	Eupen	77	(30)
2011	Mons	13	(0)
2012–2014	Royal Antwerp	38	(14)
2014–2015	AZAL	28	(13)
2015	Viktoria Köln	14	(6)
2016	Waldhof Mannheim	13	(2)
2016–2018	Union SG	20	(2)
2017–2018	→ RFC Liège (loan)	?	(?)
2018–	Patro Eisden Maasmechelen	?	(?)
- * Club domestic league appearances and goals as of 5 December 2016

Freddy Mombongo-Dues (born 30 August 1985) is a Congolese footballer who plays for Patro Eisden Maasmechelen in the Belgian Second Amateur Division.

== Career ==
=== Club ===
On 27 July 2011, Mombongo-Dues signed a one-year contract, with the option of a second, with Belgian Pro League side Mons. After only six months with Mons, Mombongo-Dues moved to fellow Pro League side Royal Antwerp on 31 January 2012, signing a 2.5-year contract. After his Antwerp contract expired, Mombongo-Dues moved to AZAL PFK of the Azerbaijan Premier League on 25 August 2014, signing a two-year contract.

== Career statistics ==
=== Club ===
As of 29 May 2015

Club performance			League		Cup		Continental		Total	
Season	Club	League	Apps	Goals	Apps	Goals	Apps	Goals	Apps	Goals
2003–04	1. FC Köln II	Regionalliga Nord	3	0			—		3	0
2004–05	Bonner SC	Oberliga Nordrhein					—			
2004–05	Dattenfeld	Oberliga Nordrhein					—			
2005–06	Dattenfeld	Oberliga Nordrhein					—			
2006–07	VfL Rheinbach	Verbandsliga Mittelrhein					—			
2007–08	Wuppertal	Regionalliga Nord	4	0	1	0	—		5	0
2007–08	Wuppertal II	Oberliga Nordrhein	11	3			—		11	3
2008–09	Eupen	Belgian Second Division	13	13			—		13	13
2009–10	Eupen	Belgian Second Division	31	13			—		31	13
2010–11	Eupen	Belgian Pro League	15	2	2	1	—		17	3
2011–12	Mons	Belgian Pro League	13	0	1	0	—		14	0
2011–12	Antwerp	Belgian Second Division	10	5	0	0	—		10	5
2012–13	Antwerp	Belgian Second Division	5	2	1	0	—		6	2
2013–14	Antwerp	Belgian Second Division	23	7	0	0	—		23	7
2014–15	AZAL	Azerbaijan Premier League	28	13	3	1	—		31	14
Total	Germany		18	3	1	0	—		19	3
Total	Belgium		110	42	4	1	—		114	43
Total	Azerbaijan		28	13	3	1	—		31	14
Career total			138	55	7	2	—		145	57
