= Javid Taghiyev (footballer) =

Azerbaijani footballer (born 1992)

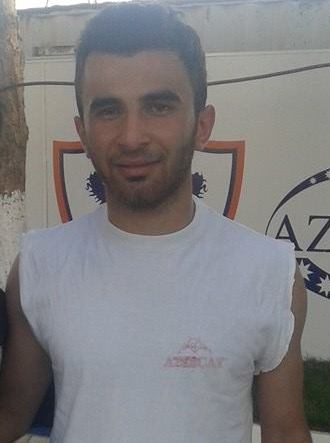

Personal information
- Full name: Javid Gabil oglu Taghiyev
- Date of birth: 22 July 1992 (age 34)
- Place of birth: Tovuz, Azerbaijan
- Height: 1.71 m (5 ft 7 in)
- Position: Midfielder

Team information
- Current team: Jabrayil
- Number: 28

Youth career
- Turan Tovuz

Senior career*
Years	Team	Apps	(Gls)
2008–2012	Turan Tovuz	35	(3)
2012–2014	AZAL	52	(6)
2014–2016	Qarabağ	44	(2)
2016–2017	Zira	12	(1)
2017–2019	Sumgayit	43	(2)
2019–2020	Sabah	4	(0)
2021–2022	Sabail	23	(0)
2022–2023	Turan Tovuz	12	(0)
2024–	Jabrayil		

International career^{‡}
2012	Azerbaijan U21	1	(0)
2015–2016	Azerbaijan	2	(0)
- * Club domestic league appearances and goals as of 11 April 2024 ‡ National team caps and goals as of 26 March 2016

Javid Taghiyev (Azerbaijani: Cavid Tağıyev, born on 22 July 1992) is an Azerbaijani professional footballer who plays as a midfielder for Jabrayil FK.

== Career ==
In June 2014, Taghiyev moved from AZAL to Qarabağ.

On 30 August 2016, Taghiyev signed a two-year contract with Zira FK.

On 31 May 2019, Taghiyev signed a two-year contract with Sabah FK.

== Career statistics ==
=== Club ===
As of match played 21 August 2016

Club	Season	League			National Cup		Continental		Total	
Club	Season	Division	Apps	Goals	Apps	Goals	Apps	Goals	Apps	Goals
Turan Tovuz	2009–10	Azerbaijan Premier League	4	1	0	0	-		4	1
Turan Tovuz	2010–11	Azerbaijan Premier League	16	1	0	0	-		16	1
Turan Tovuz	2011–12	Azerbaijan Premier League	15	1	0	0	-		15	1
Turan Tovuz	Total		35	3	0	0	-	-	35	3
AZAL	2012–13	Azerbaijan Premier League	26	5	1	0	-		27	5
AZAL	2013–14	Azerbaijan Premier League	26	1	1	0	-		27	1
AZAL	Total		52	6	2	0	-	-	54	6
Qarabağ	2014–15	Azerbaijan Premier League	29	2	4	2	4	0	37	4
Qarabağ	2015–16	Azerbaijan Premier League	15	0	3	1	9	0	27	1
Qarabağ	Total		44	2	7	3	13	0	64	5
Career total			131	11	9	3	13	0	153	14

=== International ===
Azerbaijan
Year	Apps	Goals
2015	1	0
2016	1	0
Total	2	0

Statistics accurate as of match played 26 March 2016 |}

== Honours ==
Qarabağ

- Azerbaijan Premier League: (2) 2014-15, 2015–16
- Azerbaijan Cup: (2) 2014-15, 2015-16
