= Alfred Sankoh =

Sierra Leonean footballer

Personal information
- Date of birth: 22 October 1988 (age 38)
- Place of birth: Freetown, Sierra Leone
- Height: 1.75 m (5 ft 9 in)
- Position: Midfielder

Team information
- Current team: NSÍ Runavík

Senior career*
Years	Team	Apps	(Gls)
–2005	Kallon		
2006	GPA		
2006	Old Edwardians		
2007–2008	Ullern	22	(5)
2008–2012	Strømsgodset	79	(7)
2012–2014	Şanlıurfaspor	57	(3)
2014–2015	Khazar Lankaran	25	(2)
2015–2016	Balıkesirspor	21	(0)
2016–2017	Denizlispor	33	(0)
2018–2019	Al Jabalain		
2019	Majees		
2019	Notodden	7	(0)
2020–	NSÍ Runavík	0	(0)

International career^{‡}
2010–	Sierra Leone	15	(0)
- * Club domestic league appearances and goals as of 27 October 2019 ‡ National team caps and goals as of 12 August 2014

Alfred Sankoh (born 22 October 1988) is a Sierra Leonean footballer who is currently plays for NSÍ Runavík as a midfielder.

== Career ==
=== Club ===
Sankoh began training with Strømsgodset in May 2008, going on to sign permanently for the club in July of the same year. In July 2012, Sankoh signed a three-year contract with TFF First League side Şanlıurfaspor. Two years later, in July 2014, Sankoh moved to Khazar Lankaran, signing a two-year contract.

=== International ===
Sankoh made his debut for Sierra Leone in a 0-0, 2012 Africa Cup of Nations qualifier, draw against South Africa on 10 October 2010.

== Career statistics ==
=== Club ===
As of 8 March 2014

Season	Club	Division	League		Cup		Total	
Season	Club	Division	Apps	Goals	Apps	Goals	Apps	Goals
2008	Strømsgodset	Tippeligaen	2	0	2	0	4	0
2009	Strømsgodset	Tippeligaen	19	1	1	0	20	1
2010	Strømsgodset	Tippeligaen	25	1	6	2	31	3
2011	Strømsgodset	Tippeligaen	22	4	4	1	26	5
2012	Strømsgodset	Tippeligaen	11	1	2	1	13	2
2012–13	Şanlıurfaspor	TFF First League	27	0	2	0	29	0
2013–14	Şanlıurfaspor	TFF First League	30	3	1	0	31	3
2014–15	Khazar Lankaran	Azerbaijan Premier League	25	2	1	0	19	2
2015–16	Balıkesirspor	TFF First League	0	0	0	0	0	0
Career Total			161	12	19	4	173	16

=== International ===
Sierra Leone national team
Year	Apps	Goals
2010	1	0
2011	2	0
2012	2	0
2013	1	0
2014	3	0
2016	2	0
Total	11	0

Statistics accurate as of match played 19 July 2014
