= Vladimir Bogdanović =

Serbian footballer

Personal information
- Full name: Владимир Богдановић
- Date of birth: 5 October 1986 (age 40)
- Place of birth: Kraljevo, SFR Yugoslavia
- Height: 1.80 m (5 ft 11 in)
- Position: Central midfielder

Youth career
- 1998–2001: Sloga Kraljevo
- 2001–2004: Red Star Belgrade

Senior career*
Years	Team	Apps	(Gls)
2004–2011	Red Star Belgrade	53	(4)
2004–2005	→ Jedinstvo Ub (loan)	26	(0)
2005–2006	→ Radnički Niš (loan)	28	(0)
2006–2007	→ Smederevo (loan)	25	(1)
2011	Liaoning Whowin	18	(1)
2012	Lokomotiv Sofia	1	(0)
2012–2013	Panetolikos	12	(0)
2013	AZAL	26	(0)
2014–2015	Veris	15	(0)
2015–2016	Radnički Niš	22	(0)
2016	Borac Čačak	14	(1)
2017–2019	Speranța Nisporeni	49	(0)
2019	Petrocub Hîncești	11	(0)

International career
	Serbia U-21	5	(0)
- * Club domestic league appearances and goals as of 26 November 2019

Vladimir "Guma" Bogdanović (Serbian Cyrillic: Владимир Богдановић, pronounced [ʋlǎdimiːr boɡdǎːnoʋitɕ]; born 5 October 1986) is a Serbian retired footballer.

== Career ==
Bogdanović started his career at FK Jedinstvo Ub before joining Red Star. He was then loaned to FK Smederevo and came back to Red Star prior to the Serbian Superliga 2007-08 season. He transferred to Chinese club Liaoning Whowin at March 2011. In July 2012 he signed a 1-year contract with Greek club Panetolikos F.C., after being on trial for a week. He was released on 20 January 2013. After Greece, Bogdanovic played 2 seasons in Azerbaijan's team AZAL, after which exceeds the Moldovan Veris Chișinău. In July 2015, he returned to Serbian Superliga, and will perform in Radnički Niš. In July 2016, he signed for Borac Čačak.
