= Elmaddin Mammadov =

Azerbaijani footballer (born 1995)

Personal information
- Full name: Məmmədov Elməddin Azad oğlu
- Date of birth: October 9, 1995 (age 31)
- Place of birth: Baku, Azerbaijan
- Height: 1.92 m (6 ft 4 in)
- Position: Goalkeeper

Team information
- Current team: T.C. Sports Club
- Number: 1

Youth career
- -2013: AZAL PFK

Senior career*
Years	Team	Apps	(Gls)
2013-2014	AZAL PFK-2		
2015	FK Baku		
2015–2017	Zira FK		
2017	FC Alga Bishkek	8	(0)
2017–2018	Sabah FK	1	(0)
2018–2019	FC Tskhinvali	8	(0)
2019–2020	St. Andrews	1	(0)
2020–	TC Sports Club	9	(0)

International career
2010	Azerbaijan U15		
2012	Azerbaijan U17		
2013	Azerbaijan U19	3	(1)
- Azerbaijan U21
- * Club domestic league appearances and goals

Elmaddin Mammadov (Azerbaijani: Elməddin Məmmədov; born on 9 October 1995), is an Azerbaijani footballer who plays as a goalkeeper for TC Sports Club in the Dhivehi Premier League. He defended the colors of the youth (up to 15, 17 and up to 19 years old) and youth teams of Azerbaijan.

== Biography ==
Elmaddin Mammadov was born on October 9, 1995, in Baku.

In 2003-2014 he studied at the secondary school No. 247 in Baku.

== Career ==
=== Club career ===
==== Early career ====
He started playing football at the age of 9, in the children's football school of the AZAL club, of which he is a pupil.

==== Professional career ====
===== AZAL =====
He began his professional career as a football player in the reserve squad of FC AZAL in 2011.

===== Alga Bishkek =====
In 2016–2017, for the first time in his career, he became a legionnaire. By signing an annual contract with the club of the Premier League of Kyrgyzstan - "Alga" FC. He also played one game in the Kyrgyzstan Cup.

===== Tskhinvali =====
In the 2018–2019 season, he spent one season in the club of the first Georgian league - "Tskhinvali". He played 8 games in the championship. He also played one game in the Georgian Cup.

===== St. Andrews =====
In 2019-2020 for 4 months he played in the St. Andrews F.C. in the top division of the championship of Malta.

===== TC Sports Club =====
In 2020, Mammadov signed for Maldivian side TC Sports Club.

=== International career ===
He has experience in playing for the youth teams of Azerbaijan under 15, 17 and 19 years old, as well as for the youth team of Azerbaijan under 21 years old.

==== U-19 ====
He made his debut in the Azerbaijan youth team U19 on March 22, 2013, in a friendly match against the Estonian youth team U17. He played all 90 minutes of the match on the field.
