= Shahriyar Rahimov =

Azerbaijani footballer (1989–2023)

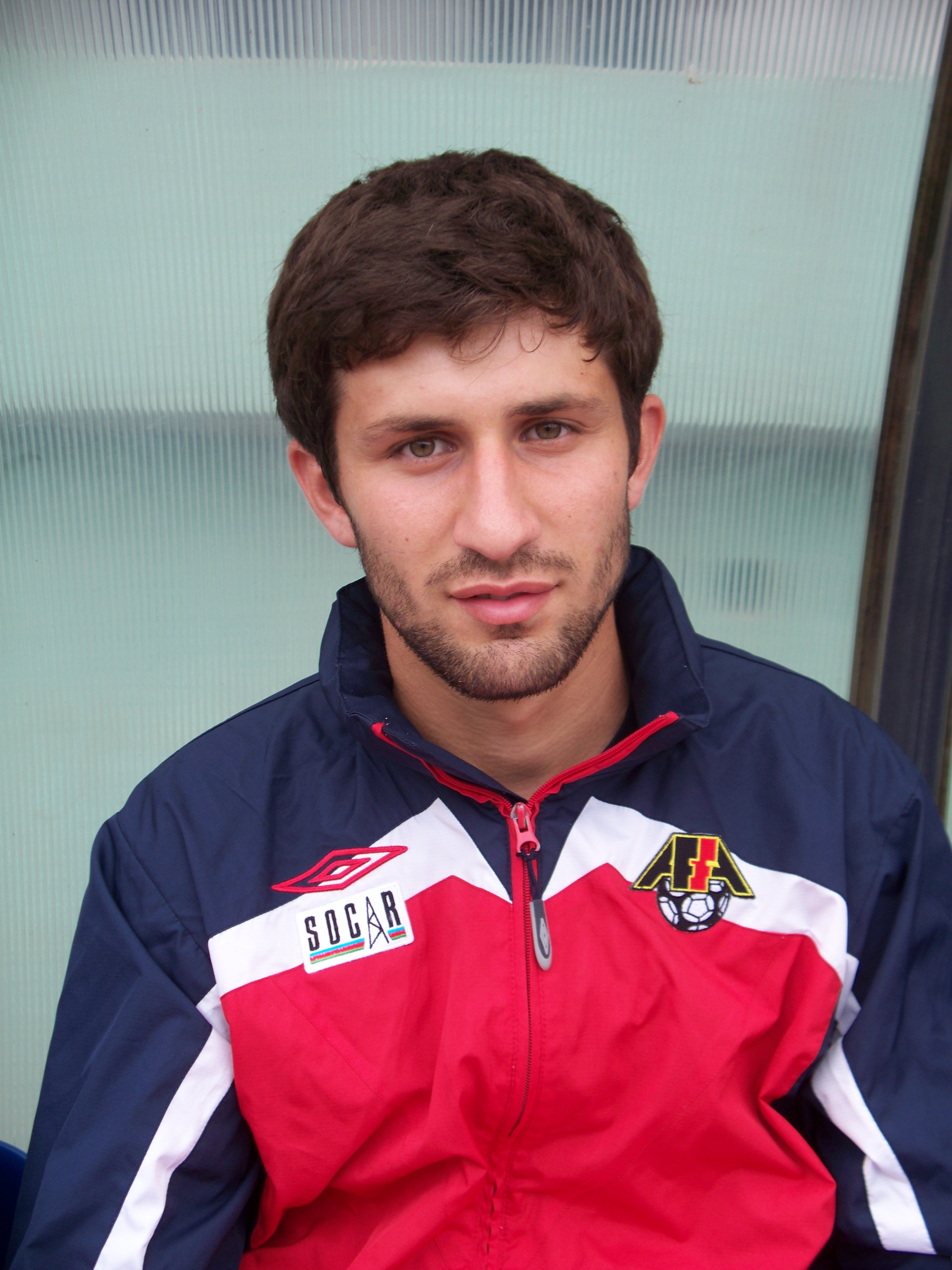

Personal information
- Full name: Shahriyar Agali oglu Rahimov
- Date of birth: 6 April 1989
- Place of birth: Baku, Azerbaijan SSR, USSR
- Date of death: 25 August 2023 (aged 34)
- Place of death: Turkey
- Position: Left-back

Senior career*
Years	Team	Apps	(Gls)
2007–2011	Keşla	23	(0)
2010	→ Karvan (loan)	12	(1)
2012	Shuvalan	10	(0)
2012–2013	Ravan Baku	31	(1)
2013–2015	Shuvalan	46	(2)
2015–2018	Kapaz	89	(8)
2018–2020	Sabail	43	(2)
2020–2021	Zira	9	(0)
Total		263	(14)

International career
2009–2010	Azerbaijan U21	12	(1)
2018–2019	Azerbaijan	9	(0)
- * Club domestic league appearances and goals

Shahriyar Agali oglu Rahimov (Azerbaijani: Şəhriyar Ağəli oğlu Rəhimov; 6 April 1989 – 25 August 2023) was an Azerbaijani professional footballer who played as a left-back.

== Club career ==
On 19 July 2020, Rahimov signed a two-year contract with Zira FK.

== International career ==
Rahimov made 12 appearances under Azerbaijan U21 form (both official and friendly) and scored goal in a friendly match against Moldovan peers.

On 23 March 2018, Rahimov made his senior international debut for Azerbaijan against Belarus.

== Death ==
Shahriyar Rahimov died of cancer on 25 August 2023, at the age of 34.

== Career statistics ==
Appearances and goals by national team and year
National team	Year	Apps	Goals
Azerbaijan	2018	1	0
Azerbaijan	2019	8	0
Total		9	0
