= Ruslan Majidov =

Azerbaijani footballer (born 1985)

Personal information
- Full name: Ruslan Majidov
- Date of birth: 22 August 1985 (age 41)
- Place of birth: Azerbaijan SSR, Soviet Union
- Height: 1.92 m (6 ft 3 1/2 in)
- Position: Goalkeeper

Senior career*
Years	Team	Apps	(Gls)
2001–2002	Spartak Moscow	0	(0)
2003	Kristall Smolensk	1	(0)
2004	FC Vidnoe	1	(0)
2005	Anzhi Makhachkala	0	(0)
2006–2007	Widzew Łódź	7	(0)
2007	Neftchi Baku	1	(0)
2008–2009	Ganjlarbirliyi Sumgayit	9	(0)
2009–2010	Gostaresh Foolad	0	(0)
2010–2011	Kapaz	3	(0)
2011–2012	Sumgayit	0	(0)
2012–2015	AZAL	40	(0)
Total		62	(0)

International career
2003–2005	Azerbaijan U21		
2005	Azerbaijan	1	(0)
- * Club domestic league appearances and goals

Ruslan Majidov, also spelled Medzhidov (Azeri: Ruslan Məcidov), (born 22 August 1985) is an Azerbaijani former professional footballer who played as a goalkeeper. He is a former member of the Azerbaijan national team. Majidov also has Russian citizenship.

== Career statistics ==
=== Club ===
As of 13 August 2015

Appearances and goals by club, season and competition
Club	Season	League	League		Cup		Other		Total	
Club	Season	League	Apps	Goals	Apps	Goals	Apps	Goals	Apps	Goals
Widzew Łódź	2005–06	II liga	5	0	0	0	—		5	0
Widzew Łódź	2006–07	Ekstraklasa	2	0	2	0	—		4	0
Widzew Łódź	Total		7	0	2	0	0	0	9	0
Neftchi Baku	2007–08	Azerbaijan Premier League	1	0	0	0	—		1	0
Gänclärbirliyi Sumqayit	2007–08	Azerbaijan Premier League	9	0	0	0	—		9	0
Gostaresh Foulad	2009–10	Azadegan League	0	0	0	0	—		0	0
Kapaz	2010–11	Azerbaijan Premier League	3	0	0	0	-		3	0
Sumgayit	2011–12	Azerbaijan Premier League	0	0	0	0	—		0	0
AZAL	2012–13	Azerbaijan Premier League	6	0	0	0	—		6	0
AZAL	2013–14	Azerbaijan Premier League	24	0	1	0	—		25	0
AZAL	2014–15	Azerbaijan Premier League	10	0	0	0	—		10	0
AZAL	Total		40	0	1	0	0	0	41	0
Career total			60	0	3	0	0	0	63	0

=== International ===
Azerbaijan national team
Year	Apps	Goals
2005	1	0
Total	1	0

== Honours ==
Widzew Łódź

- II liga: 2005–06
