= Ruslan Zubkov =

Ukrainian footballer

Personal information
- Full name: Ruslan Vladyslavovych Zubkov
- Date of birth: 24 November 1991 (age 34)
- Place of birth: Odesa, Ukraine
- Height: 1.89 m (6 ft 2 in)
- Position: Centre-back

Team information
- Current team: LKS Ślesin
- Number: 6

Youth career
- 2004–2008: Chornomorets Odesa

Senior career*
Years	Team	Apps	(Gls)
2009–2010	Tytan Armyansk	15	(0)
2010–2012	Odesa	39	(0)
2012–2013	AZAL Baku	0	(0)
2012	→ Turan Tovuz (loan)	10	(0)
2014	Araz Naxçıvan	8	(1)
2015	Illichivets Mariupol	9	(1)
2015–2016	Real Pharma Odesa	8	(4)
2016	Zirka Kropyvnytskyi	15	(0)
2017–2018	Neman Grodno	25	(0)
2019	Lviv	7	(0)
2020	Veres Rivne	0	(0)
2020	Kremin Kremenchuk	14	(1)
2021	Kramatorsk	29	(5)
2022	Ahrobiznes Volochysk	0	(0)
2022	→ Ruch Chorzów (loan)	10	(0)
2022–2023	Polonia Bytom	25	(2)
2023–	LKS Ślesin	42	(31)
- * Club domestic league appearances and goals as of 12 November 2024

Ruslan Vladyslavovych Zubkov (Ukrainian: Руслан Владиславович Зубков; born 24 November 1991) is a Ukrainian professional footballer who plays as a centre-back for Polish IV liga club LKS Ślesin.

== Career ==
Zubkov previously played for Chornomorets Odesa youth teams and FC Odesa. In June 2012, he joined to AZAL PFC and signed two years-long contract and was loaned by Turan Tovuz. In December he came back to his club. Zubkov was made a free agent when Araz-Naxçıvan folded and withdrew from the Azerbaijan Premier League on 17 November 2014.

== Honours ==
Polonia Bytom

- III liga, group III: 2022–23

LKS Ślesin

- V liga Greater Poland II: 2023–24
