= 2014–15 Azerbaijan Premier League =

Azerbaijan Premier League
- Season: 2014–15
- Champions: Qarabağ
- Champions League: Qarabağ
- Europa League: Inter Baku; Gabala; Neftchi Baku
- Matches: 144
- Goals: 354 (2.46 per match)
- Top goalscorer: Nurlan Novruzov (14 goals)
- Biggest home win: Inter Baku 7–0 Baku
- Biggest away win: AZAL 0–4 Gabala
- Highest scoring: Inter Baku 7–0 Baku; Simurq 5–2 Baku
- Highest attendance: 7,500; Araz-Naxçıvan 3–0 Neftchi (11 August 2014)
- Lowest attendance: 500; AZAL 1–1 Khazar Lankaran (9 August 2014)
- All statistics correct as of 9 March 2015.

The 2014–15 Azerbaijan Premier League was the 23rd season of Azerbaijan Premier League, the Azerbaijani professional league for association football clubs, since its establishment in 1992. Qarabağ were the defending champions, having won the previous season. The season started on 9 August 2014 and ended on 28 May 2015.

== Teams ==
Location of teams in 2014–15 Azerbaijan Premier League

Ravan Baku were relegated to Azerbaijan First Division.

The format of the league did not change as a total of 10 teams contested the league, with the last club relegated and Araz-Naxçıvan promoted from the First Division. The competition format follows the usual double round-robin format. During the course of a season, which lasts from August to May, each club plays every other club four times, twice at home and twice away, for a total of 36 games.

On 3 November 2014, Araz-Naxçıvan announced their withdrawal from the league due to alleged constant biased referee decisions, which meant that all of their results were annulled.

=== Stadia and locations ===
Note: Table lists in alphabetical order.

Team	Location	Venue	Capacity
Araz-Naxçıvan	Nakhchivan	Nakhchivan City Stadium	11,800
AZAL	Baku	AZAL Stadium	5,000
Baku	Baku	FC Baku's Training Base	2,000
Gabala	Gabala	Gabala City Stadium	8,000
Inter Baku	Baku	Inter Arena	10,000
Khazar Lankaran	Lankaran	Lankaran City Stadium	15,000
Neftchi Baku	Baku	Bakcell Arena	11,000
Qarabağ	Ağdam	Tofiq Bahramov Stadium	31,200
Simurq	Zaqatala	Zaqatala City Stadium	3,500
Sumgayit	Sumqayit	Kapital Bank Arena	16,000

=== Personnel and kits ===
Note: Flags indicate national team as has been defined under FIFA eligibility rules. Players may hold more than one non-FIFA nationality.

Team	Manager	Team captain	Kit manufacturer	Shirt sponsor
Araz-Naxçıvan	(Azerbaijan) Asgar Abdullayev	(Azerbaijan) Elmin Chobanov	Joma	
AZAL	(Azerbaijan) Tarlan Ahmadov	(Azerbaijan) Shahriyar Rahimov	Umbro	Silk Way
Baku	(Turkey) Ibrahim Uzunca	(Azerbaijan) Aqil Mammadov	Kappa	
Gabala	(Ukraine) Roman Hryhorchuk	(Azerbaijan) Volodimir Levin	Joma	Pepsi
Inter Baku	(Georgia (country)) Kakhaber Tskhadadze	(Azerbaijan) Asif Mammadov	Umbro	IBA
Khazar Lankaran	(Azerbaijan) Elbrus Mammadov	(Azerbaijan) Rahid Amirguliyev	Puma	Palmali
Neftçi Baku	(Azerbaijan) Arif Asadov	(Brazil) Flavinho	Adidas	SOCAR
Qarabağ	(Azerbaijan) Gurban Gurbanov	(Azerbaijan) Rashad Sadygov	Adidas	Azersun
Simurq	(Georgia (country)) Giorgi Chikhradze	(Azerbaijan) Ilkin Qirtimov	Joma	
Sumgayit	(Azerbaijan) Agil Mammadov	(Azerbaijan) Ruslan Poladov	Umbro	Azerkimya

=== Managerial changes ===
Team	Outgoing manager	Manner of departure	Date of vacancy	Position in table	Incoming manager	Date of appointment
Khazar Lankaran	(Turkey) Mustafa Denizli	Mutual consent	16 May 2014	Pre-season	(Turkey) Oğuz Çetin	5 June 2014
Gabala	(Russia) Yuri Semin	Mutual consent	23 May 2014	Pre-season	(Romania) Dorinel Munteanu	14 June 2014
Baku	(Serbia) Milinko Pantić	Mutual consent	24 July 2014	Pre-season	(Turkey) Ibrahim Uzunca	12 August 2014
Neftchi Baku	(Azerbaijan) Boyukagha Hajiyev	Resigned	3 September 2014	6th	(Azerbaijan) Arif Asadov	4 September 2014
Gabala	(Romania) Dorinel Munteanu	Sacked	8 December 2014	6th	(Azerbaijan) Sanan Gurbanov (caretaker)	8 December 2014
Gabala	(Azerbaijan) Sanan Gurbanov (caretaker)	End of tenure as caretaker	21 December 2014	6th	(Ukraine) Roman Hryhorchuk	21 December 2014
Khazar	(Turkey) Oğuz Çetin	Resigned	22 December 2014	5th	(Azerbaijan) Elbrus Mammadov	23 December 2014

== League table ==
Pos	Team	Pld	W	D	L	GF	GA	GD	Pts	Qualification
1	Qarabağ (C)	32	20	8	4	51	28	+23	68	Qualification for Champions League second qualifying round
2	Inter Baku	32	17	12	3	55	20	+35	63	Qualification for Europa League first qualifying round
3	Gabala	32	15	9	8	46	35	+11	54	Qualification for Europa League first qualifying round
4	Neftchi Baku	32	13	10	9	38	33	+5	49	Qualification for Europa League first qualifying round
5	Simurq	32	11	6	15	41	39	+2	39	
6	AZAL	32	10	9	13	37	42	−5	39	
7	Khazar Lankaran	32	8	8	16	35	46	−11	32	
8	Sumgayit	32	7	10	15	32	43	−11	31	
9	Baku	32	3	8	21	19	68	−49	17	Relegation to the Azerbaijan First Division
10	Araz-Naxçıvan (Note: Araz-Naxçıvan were officially withdrawn from the league on 17 November 2014)	0	0	0	0	0	0	0	0	Team withdrawn

Source: uefa.com
Rules for classification: 1) points; 2) head-to-head points; 3) head-to-head goal difference; 4) head-to-head goals scored; 5. head-to-head away goals (only if 2 teams are tied); 6) goal difference; 7) goals scored.
(C) Champions

== Results ==
=== Games 1–18 ===
Home \ Away	AZL	BAK	INT	KHA	SIM	NEF	QAR	GAB	SUM
AZAL		0–1	1–1	1–1	2–2	2–1	0–3	3–3	3–2
Baku	1–3		0–1	0–0	1–0	1–3	2–4	0–2	1–2
Inter Baku	1–0	7–0		3–1	0–0	2–1	0–0	4–0	5–1
Khazar Lankaran	1–1	4–0	1–0		2–1	2–2	2–3	3–0	0–1
Simurq	2–0	5–2	1–1	2–0		1–0	2–3	1–2	3–2
Neftçi Baku	4–0	1–0	0–0	1–0	2–1		1–3	0–0	3–2
Qarabağ	2–1	2–2	0–0	3–2	1–0	0–0		2–0	2–0
Gabala	1–2	1–1	1–1	1–1	2–3	0–0	2–1		3–1
Sumgayit	0–1	1–1	0–0	1–2	2–1	0–1	3–0	1–1	

Source: Azerbaijan Premier League
Legend: Blue = home team win; Yellow = draw; Red = away team win.

=== Games 19–36 ===
Home \ Away	AZL	BAK	INT	KHA	SIM	NEF	QAR	GAB	SUM
AZAL		2–0	1–1	3–1	5–0	0–1	0–1	0–4	1–1
Baku	0–2		1–2	2–1	0–3	0–0	1–1	0–2	0–0
Inter Baku	2–0	4–0		2–0	2–1	4–0	2–1	1–2	0–0
Khazar Lankaran	1–0	2–1	1–2		0–0	2–2	1–1	0–1	3–2
Simurq	1–0	4–0	2–3	2–0		0–1	0–2	2–0	1–1
Neftçi Baku	1–1	2–0	0–2	2–0	0–0		0–1	1–3	2–2
Qarabağ	2–1	4–1	0–0	1–0	1–0	3–2		0–1	1–0
Gabala	0–1	3–0	1–1	3–1	1–0	1–3	1–1		2–0
Sumgayit	0–0	0–0	3–1	2–0	1–0	0–1	1–2	0–2	

Legend: Blue = home team win; Yellow = draw; Red = away team win.

== Season statistics ==
=== Scoring ===
- First goal of the season: Rauf Aliyev for Khazar against AZAL (9 August 2014)
- Fastest goal of the season: 1st minute,
  - Freddy Mombongo-Dues for AZAL against Inter Baku (19 February 2015)
- Latest goal of the season: 94 minutes,
  - Mirhuseyn Seyidov for Neftchi Baku against Khazar Lankaran (24 November 2014)
- Largest winning margin: 7 goals
  - Inter Baku 7–0 Baku (19 September 2014)
- Highest scoring game: 7 goals
  - Inter Baku 7–0 Baku (19 September 2014)
- Most goals scored in a match by a single team: 7 goals
  - Inter Baku 7–0 Baku (19 September 2014)

=== Top scorers ===
As of 28 May 2015

Rank	Player	Club	Goals
1	(Azerbaijan) Nurlan Novruzov	Baku	15
2	(Serbia) Dragan Ćeran	Simurq	14
3	(Democratic Republic of the Congo) Freddy Mombongo-Dues	AZAL	13
3	(Azerbaijan) Magomed Kurbanov	Sumgayit	13
5	(Azerbaijan) Javid Huseynov	Gabala	11
5	(Chile) Nicolás Canales	Neftchi	11
7	(Brazil) Reynaldo	Qarabağ	10
7	(Netherlands) Leroy George	Qarabağ	10
9	(Spain) Mikel Álvaro	Inter Baku	9
10	(Brazil) Nildo	Inter Baku	8

=== Hat-tricks ===
Player	For	Against	Result	Date
(Democratic Republic of the Congo) Freddy Mombongo-Dues^{4}	AZAL	Simurq	5–0	22 May 2015

- ^{4} Player scored 4 goals

=== Discipline ===
==== Player ====
Most yellow cards; 12

- Ruslan Abışov (Gabala)
- Alfred Sankoh (Khazar Lankaran)
- Éric Ramos (Neftchi Baku)

Most red cards; 2

- Vugar Baybalayev (Baku)
- Elshad Manafov (Baku)
- Carlos Cardoso (Neftchi Baku)

==== Club ====
- Most yellow cards: 105
  - Neftchi Baku
- Most red cards: 8
  - Baku
  - Neftchi Baku
