= AZAL Arena =

Football stadium in Shuvelan, Baku, Azerbaijan

Coordinates: 40°29′49″N 50°11′47″E

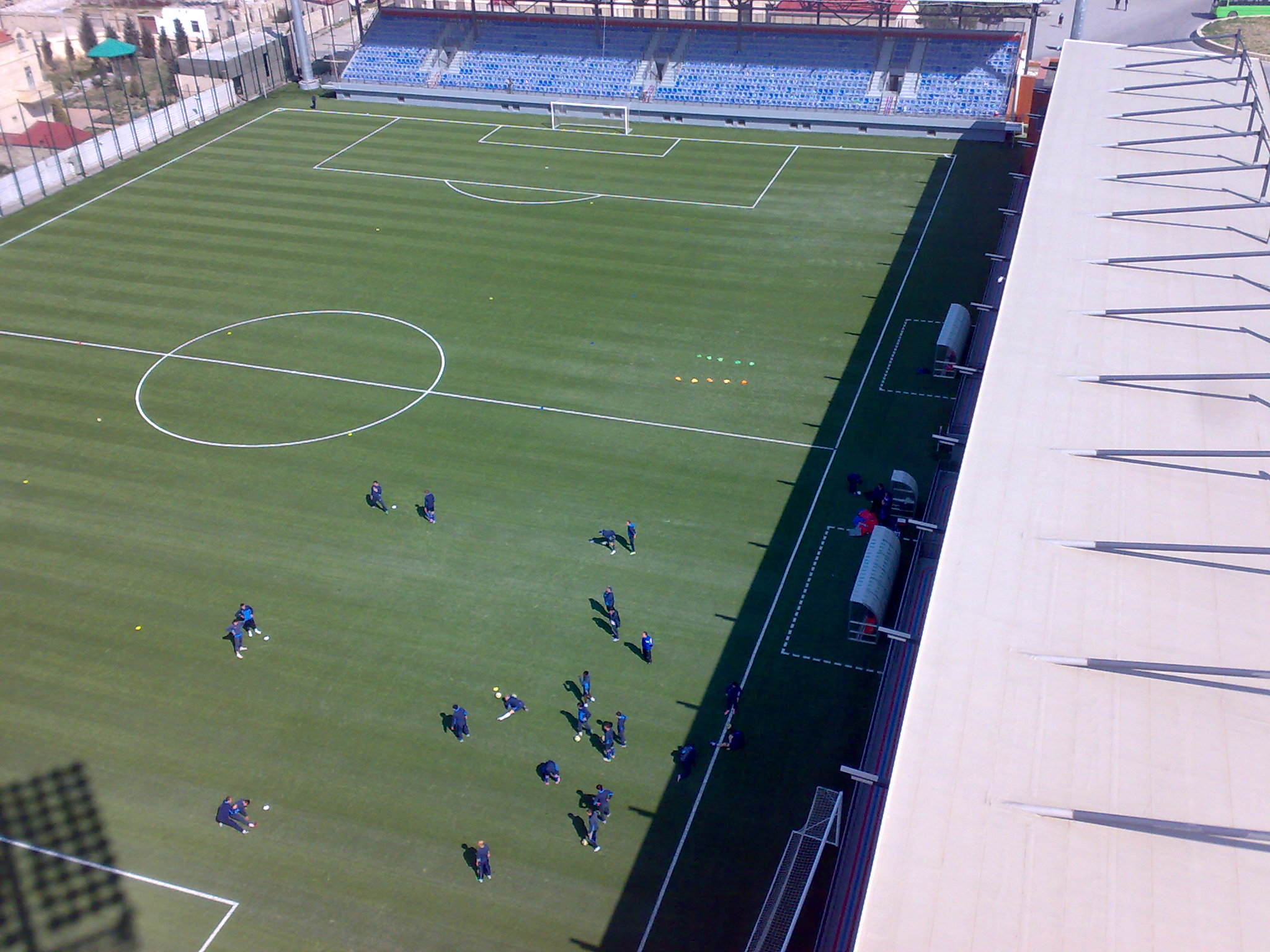
- UEFA
- Interactive map of AZAL Arena
- Location: Shuvelan, Baku, Azerbaijan
- Owner: Shuvalan FK
- Capacity: 2,983
- Surface: Artificial

Construction
- Groundbreaking: 2009
- Opened: April 10, 2011

Tenant
- Shuvalan FK

AZAL Arena is a football stadium in the Shuvelan settlement of Baku, Azerbaijan. It was the home stadium of Shuvalan FK. The stadium holds 2,983 people and opened in 2011.

== Background ==
The first game ever played at AZAL Arena was AZAL PFC - FK Baku (1:0), on April 10, 2011. Belarusian striker Gennady Bliznyuk scored a first goal at the stadium.

On 17 February 2011, UEFA approved this stadium to be used for international football matches and gave 2 stars for the stadium category.

== Future ==
The club plans to construct another tribune and increase the capacity to 6000 in the coming years.

== Events ==
The stadium was used as a training ground during 2012 FIFA U-17 Women's World Cup.

== See also ==
- List of football stadiums in Azerbaijan
