= Jahangir Hasanzade =

Azerbaijani footballer (born 1979)

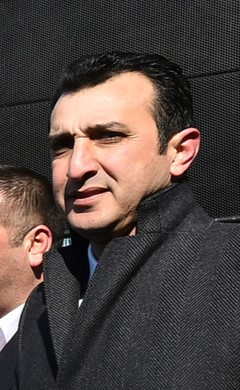

Personal information
- Full name: Cahangir Əli oğlu Həsənzadə
- Date of birth: 4 August 1979 (age 47)
- Place of birth: Baku, Azerbaijan SSR, Soviet Union
- Height: 1.91 m (6 ft 3 in)
- Position: Goalkeeper

Senior career*
Years	Team	Apps	(Gls)
1995–1996	MOIK Baku	8	(0)
1996	Farid Baku	9	(0)
1997	Shafa Baku	18	(0)
1997	Bakili Baku	1	(0)
1998–2002	Neftchi Baku	68	(0)
2000	→ Shafa Baku (loan)	7	(0)
2002	Volyn Lutsk	0	(0)
2002–2003	Tavriya Simferopol	12	(0)
2004–2005	Neftchi Baku	14	(0)
2005–2007	Qarabağ	33	(0)
2007–2008	Inter Baku	6	(0)
2008–2009	Gabala	11	(0)
2009–2014	AZAL	89	(0)
2014	Khazar Lankaran	6	(0)

International career^{‡}
1998–2007	Azerbaijan	34	(0)
- * Club domestic league appearances and goals as of 22 August 2014 ‡ National team caps and goals as of 22 March 2014

Jahangir Hasanzade (Azerbaijani: Cahangir Əli oğlu Həsənzadə; born 4 August 1979) is a retired Azerbaijani footballer who last played for Khazar Lankaran.

== Career ==
Jahangir Hasanzade began his career at Baku clubs, such as MOIK, Farid and Bakili. In 1998, Azerbaijan national football team former head coach Ahmad Alaskarov invited him to Neftchi Baku. Hasanzade became the No. 1 immediately and played a key role in 1998-99 Azerbaijan Cup final game. Later, he became the main goalkeeper national team, especially after a brilliant performance in a 2–0 win against Slovakia.

After Neftchi and one-year loan in Shafa Jahangir went to Ukraine and played for Volyn and Tavriya in the Ukraine Premier League. First part of experience was not so successful, but at Tavriya he was a main goalkeeper till his return to Neftchi, where Hasanzade achieved his first championship.

In 2005, Jahangir Hasanzade unexpectedly cancelled contract with Neftchi and was signed by Karabakh. At the end of the season, he raised his 3rd Azerbaijan Cup.

For Inter Baku, where he won Azerbaijan Premier League for the second time, Jahangir capped only 6 times. He also failed to be the main goalkeeper in Gabala FC, and in 2009 signed a contract with AZAL PFC.

During 3 years Hasanzade capped for AZAL PFC over 80 times. In November 2012, he became the captain of the team.

In August 2014, Hasanzade moved to fellow Azerbaijan Premier League side Khazar Lankaran, signing a one-year contract.

== Career statistics ==
=== International ===
Appearances and goals by national team and year
National team	Year	Apps	Goals
Azerbaijan	1998	1	0
Azerbaijan	1999	1	0
Azerbaijan	2000	2	0
Azerbaijan	2001	6	0
Azerbaijan	2002	6	0
Azerbaijan	2003	3	0
Azerbaijan	2004	4	0
Azerbaijan	2005	3	0
Azerbaijan	2006	–	
Azerbaijan	2007	6	0
Total		32	0

== Honours ==
=== Club ===
Neftchi Baku

- Azerbaijan Premier League: (1) 2004–05
- Azerbaijan Cup: (2) 1998–99, 2000–01

FK Qarabağ

- Azerbaijan Cup: (1) 2005–06

Inter Baku

- Azerbaijan Premier League: (1) 2007–08
