= 2007–08 AZAL PFC season =

Olimpik Baku
2007–08 season
- Chairman: Rasul Rasulov
- Manager: Asgar Abdullayev
- Stadium: Shafa Stadium
- Premier League: 2nd
- Azerbaijan Cup: Quarter-finals vs Khazar Lankaran
- Top goalscorer: Junivan (11)
Home colours	Away colours

The Olimpik Baku 2007–08 season was Olimpik Baku's third Azerbaijan Premier League season and their second season with Asgar Abdullayev as manager. They participated in the 2007–08 Azerbaijan Premier League as well as the 2007–08 Azerbaijan Cup, finishing the league in 2nd, qualifying for a European competition for the first time, and reaching the quarterfinal stage of the cup, where they were eliminated by Khazar Lankaran.

== Squad ==
Note: Flags indicate national team as defined under FIFA eligibility rules; some limited exceptions apply. Players may hold more than one non-FIFA nationality.

No.	Pos.	Nation	Player
2	DF	AZE	Ilyas Gurbanov
3	DF	AZE	Nduka Usim
5	DF	SRB	Dragan Mandic
4	DF	AZE	Tarlan Ahmadov
7	DF	AZE	Agil Nabiyev
8	FW	BRA	Junivan
9	FW	SRB	Jovan Drobnjak
10	MF	AZE	Fábio
11	MF	AZE	Namiq Əliyev
12	GK	AZE	Zabit Safarov
14	DF	AZE	Elvin Aliyev
16	FW	AZE	Farrukh Ismayilov
17	MF	BRA	Aleşandro De Paula

No.	Pos.	Nation	Player
18	FW	AZE	Fəqan Şahbazov
19	FW	BLR	Dmitri Parkhachev
22	FW	GUI	Pathé Bangoura
44	GK	AZE	Rauf Mehdiyev
77	MF	AZE	Yashar Abuzerov
96	GK	AZE	Elshan Poladov
—	DF	MKD	Bilal Velija
—	MF	AZE	Yuri Muzika
—	MF	MKD	Ilami Halimi
—	MF	AZE	Narvik Sirkhayev
—	FW	AZE	Samir Musayev
—	UNK	UKR	Sergey Qribanov
—	UNK	AZE	Orxan Rəcəbov

== Transfers ==
=== Summer ===
In: Note: Flags indicate national team as defined under FIFA eligibility rules; some limited exceptions apply. Players may hold more than one non-FIFA nationality.

No.	Pos.	Nation	Player
2	DF	AZE	Ilyas Gurbanov (from (Azerbaijan) MKT-Araz)
8	FW	BRA	Junivan (from (Bulgaria) Belasitsa Petrich)
16	FW	AZE	Farrukh Ismayilov (from (Azerbaijan) Neftchi Baku)
19	FW	BLR	Dmitri Parkhachev (from (Belarus) Dinamo Brest)
20	FW	AZE	Senan Gurbanov (from (Azerbaijan) Gabala)
21	FW	AZE	Javid Huseynov (from (Azerbaijan) Turan Tovuz)
96	GK	AZE	Elshan Poladov (from (Azerbaijan) Inter Baku)
—	MF	AZE	Yuri Muzika (from (Azerbaijan) Karvan)

Out: Note: Flags indicate national team as defined under FIFA eligibility rules; some limited exceptions apply. Players may hold more than one non-FIFA nationality.

No.	Pos.	Nation	Player
—	MF	AZE	Vidadi Rzayev (Retired)
—	FW	AZE	Vadim Vasilyev (to (Azerbaijan) Karvan)
—	FW	AZE	Khagani Mammadov (to (Azerbaijan) Inter Baku)
—	FW	NIG	Ghani Animofoshe (to (Niger) JS du Ténéré)
—	FW	CGO	Mwanza Muteba (to (Northern Cyprus) Tatlısu Halk Odası)

=== Winter ===
In: Note: Flags indicate national team as defined under FIFA eligibility rules; some limited exceptions apply. Players may hold more than one non-FIFA nationality.

No.	Pos.	Nation	Player
—	DF	MKD	Bilal Velija (from (Finland) Porin Palloilijat)
—	MF	MKD	Ilami Halimi (from (Bulgaria) Lokomotiv Plovdiv)
—	MF	AZE	Narvik Sirkhayev (from (Russia) Anzhi Makhachkala)
—	FW	AZE	Samir Musayev (from (Azerbaijan) Simurq)

Out: Note: Flags indicate national team as defined under FIFA eligibility rules; some limited exceptions apply. Players may hold more than one non-FIFA nationality.

No.	Pos.	Nation	Player
20	FW	AZE	Senan Gurbanov (to (Azerbaijan) ABN Bärdä)
21	FW	AZE	Javid Huseynov (to (Azerbaijan) Inter Baku)

== Competitions ==
=== Azerbaijan Premier League ===
==== Results ====
12 August 2007 1	Olimpik Baku	1 – 0	ABN Bärdä	Baku
17:00 AZST (UTC+5)	Mandic	Summary		Stadium: Shafa Stadium

19 August 2007 2	Turan Tovuz	1 – 3	Olimpik Baku	Tovuz
17:00 AZST (UTC+5)	Garaev 13'	Summary	Usim 40'; Bangoura 76'; Drobnjak 90'	Stadium: Tovuz City Stadium

26 August 2007 3	Olimpik Baku	1 – 0	Gänclärbirliyi Sumqayit	Baku
19:00 AZST (UTC+5)	Bangoura 24'	Summary		Stadium: Shafa Stadium

2 September 2007 4	Gabala	0 – 1	Olimpik Baku	Qabala
19:00 AZST (UTC+5)		Summary	Ismayilov 35'	Stadium: Gabala City Stadium

16 September 2007 5	Olimpik Baku	1 – 0	Inter Baku	Baku
18:00 AZST (UTC+5)	Junivan 59'	Summary		Stadium: Shafa Stadium

22 September 2007 6	Standard Baku	0 – 0	Olimpik Baku	Baku
17:00 AZST (UTC+5)		Summary		Stadium: Shafa Stadium

30 September 2007 7	Olimpik Baku	3 – 0	Baku	Baku
19:00 AZST (UTC+5)	Junivan 6', 70'; Y.Abuzerov 45'	Summary		Stadium: Shafa Stadium

6 October 2007 8	Neftchi Baku	0 – 0	Olimpik Baku	Baku
15:00 AZST (UTC+5)		Summary		Stadium: Tofik Bakhramov Stadium

27 October 2007 9	Olimpik Baku	3 – 1	FK Masallı	Baku
22:25 AZST (UTC+5)	Junivan 35'; Mandic 54'; Vəliyev 56' (o.g.)	Summary	Oz 59'	Stadium: Shafa Stadium

4 November 2007 10	Olimpik Baku	1 – 0	Simurq	Baku
15:00 AZT (UTC+4)	Junivan 20'	Summary		Stadium: Shafa Stadium

10 November 2007 11	Karvan	0 – 1	Olimpik Baku	Yevlakh
15:00 AZT (UTC+4)		Summary	Junivan 31'	Stadium: Yevlakh Stadium

25 November 2007 12	Olimpik Baku	0 – 0	Khazar Lankaran	Baku
15:00 AZT (UTC+4)		Summary		Stadium: Shafa Stadium

1 December 2007 13	Qarabağ	0 – 1	Olimpik Baku	Baku
14:15 AZT (UTC+4)		Summary	Junivan 25'	Stadium: Tofiq Bahramov Stadium^{1}

16 February 2008 14	ABN Bärdä	1 – 1	Olimpik Baku	Barda
15:00 AZT (UTC+4)	S.Gurbanov 30'	Summary	Fábio 67'	Stadium: Barda City Stadium

23 February 2008 15	Olimpik Baku	3 – 0	Turan Tovuz	Baku
15:00 AZT (UTC+4)	Junivan 7', 31'; Musayev 30'	Summary		Stadium: Shafa Stadium

1 March 2008 16	Gänclärbirliyi Sumqayit	0 – 1	Olimpik Baku	Sumqayit
15:00 AZT (UTC+4)		Summary	Junivan 20'	Stadium: Mehdi Huseynzade Stadium

15 March 2008 17	Olimpik Baku	2 – 0	Gabala	Baku
15:00 AZT (UTC+4)	Junivan 22'; Fábio 79'	Summary		Stadium: Shafa Stadium

30 March 2008 18	Olimpik Baku	1 – 0	Standard Baku	Baku
16:00 AZST (UTC+5)	Ismayilov 26'	Summary		Stadium: Shafa Stadium

6 April 2008 19	Baku	0 – 1	Olimpik Baku	Baku
17:15 AZST (UTC+5)		Summary	S.Musayev 55'	Stadium: Tofig Bakhramov Stadium

13 April 2008 20	Olimpik Baku	0 – 0	Neftchi Baku	Baku
16:00 AZST (UTC+5)		Summary		Stadium: Shafa Stadium

19 April 2008 21	FK Masallı	1 – 2	Olimpik Baku	Masally
16:00 AZST (UTC+5)	B.Goncharov 24'	Summary	Velija 48'; Musayev 53'	Stadium: Anatoly Banishevski Stadium

28 April 2008 22	Inter Baku	2 – 0	Olimpik Baku	Baku
17:00 AZST (UTC+5)	Mammadov 29'; Zlatinov 90'	Summary		Stadium: Zabrat Stadium

4 May 2008 23	Simurq	0 – 0	Olimpik Baku	Zaqatala
17:00 AZST (UTC+5)		Summary		Stadium: Zaqatala City Stadium

12 May 2008 24	Olimpik Baku	2 – 0	Karvan	Baku
17:00 AZST (UTC+5)	Fábio 50'; Musayev 87'	Summary		Stadium: Shafa Stadium

17 May 2008 25	Khazar Lankaran	0 – 0	Olimpik Baku	Lankaran
18:00 AZST (UTC+5)		Summary		Stadium: Lankaran City Stadium

28 May 2008 26	Olimpik Baku	0 – 1	Qarabağ	Baku
16:00 AZST (UTC+5)		Summary	Hashimov 80'	Stadium: Shafa Stadium

==== Table ====
Pos	Team	Pld	W	D	L	GF	GA	GD	Pts	Qualification or relegation
1	Inter Baku (C)	26	18	4	4	55	18	+37	58	Qualification for Champions League first qualifying round
2	Olimpik Baku	26	17	7	2	29	7	+22	58	Qualification for UEFA Cup first qualifying round (Note: Khazar Lankaran qualified for the first qualifiying round of the 1st qualifying round of the UEFA Cup as winners of the 2007–08 Azerbaijan Cup.)
3	Neftçi Baku	26	16	7	3	42	18	+24	55	Qualification for Intertoto Cup first round
4	Khazar Lankaran	26	14	10	2	44	16	+28	52	Qualification for UEFA Cup first qualifying round
5	Qarabağ	26	11	8	7	25	16	+9	41	

Source: Azerbaijan Professional Football league
Rules for classification: 1) points; 2) goal difference; 3) number of goals scored.
(C) Champions

=== Azerbaijan Cup ===
26 September 2007 First Round 1st leg	Bakılı	0 – 3	Olimpik Baku	Baku
AZT (UTC+4)		[ Summary]		Stadium: Shafa Stadium

3 October 2007 First Round 2nd leg	Olimpik Baku	1 – 1 (4 – 1 agg.)	Bakılı	Baku
AZT (UTC+4)		[ Summary]		Stadium: Shafa Stadium

24 October 2007 Last 16 1st leg	ABN Bärdä	1 – 1	Olimpik Baku	Barda
AZT (UTC+4)	S.Gurbanov 32'	Summary	I.Gurbanov 84'	Stadium: Barda City Stadium

31 October 2007 Last 16 2nd leg	Olimpik Baku	3 – 1 (4 – 2 agg.)	ABN Bärdä	Baku
AZT (UTC+4)	Ismayilov 3', 11'; Fábio 76'	Summary	Gurbanov 44' (o.g.)	Stadium: Shafa Stadium

6 March 2008 Quarterfinals 1st Leg	Olimpik Baku	1 – 0	Khazar Lankaran	Baku
15:00 AZT (UTC+4)	Parkhachev 14'	Summary		Stadium: Shafa Stadium

19 March 2008 Quarterfinals 2nd Leg	Khazar Lankaran	2 – 0 (2 – 1 agg.)	Olimpik Baku	Lankaran
17:00 AZT (UTC+4)		Summary		Stadium: Lankaran City Stadium

== Squad statistics ==
=== Appearances and goals ===
No.	Pos	Nat	Player	Total		Premier League		Azerbaijan Cup	
No.	Pos	Nat	Player	Apps	Goals	Apps	Goals	Apps	Goals
2	DF	(Azerbaijan) AZE	Ilyas Gurbanov	7	0	7	0	0	0
3	DF	(Azerbaijan) AZE	Usim Nduka	26	1	26	1	0	0
4	DF	(Azerbaijan) AZE	Tarlan Ahmadov	26	0	26	0	0	0
5	DF	(Serbia) SRB	Dragan Mandic	23	2	23	2	0	0
7	DF	(Azerbaijan) AZE	Agil Nabiyev	26	0	26	0	0	0
8	FW	(Brazil) BRA	Junivan	21	11	21	11	0	0
9	FW	(Serbia) SRB	Jovan Drobnjak	15	1	15	1	0	0
10	MF	(Azerbaijan) AZE	Fábio	23	3	23	3	0	0
11	MF	(Azerbaijan) AZE	Namiq Əliyev	24	0	24	0	0	0
14	DF	(Azerbaijan) AZE	Elvin Aliyev	23	0	23	0	0	0
16	FW	(Azerbaijan) AZE	Farrukh Ismayilov	21	2	21	2	0	0
17	MF	(Brazil) BRA	Aleşandro De Paula	2	0	2	0	0	0
18	FW	(Azerbaijan) AZE	Fəqan Şahbazov	3	0	3	0	0	0
19	FW	(Belarus) BLR	Dmitri Parkhachev	25	0	25	0	0	0
22	FW	(Guinea) GUI	Pathé Bangoura	8	2	8	2	0	0
44	GK	(Azerbaijan) AZE	Rauf Mehdiyev	23	0	23	0	0	0
77	MF	(Azerbaijan) AZE	Yashar Abuzerov	21	1	21	1	0	0
96	GK	(Azerbaijan) AZE	Elshan Poladov	4	0	4	0	0	0
	DF	(North Macedonia) MKD	Bilal Velija	9	1	9	1	0	0
	MF	(Azerbaijan) AZE	Yuri Muzika	6	0	6	0	0	0
	MF	(North Macedonia) MKD	Ilami Halimi	5	0	5	0	0	0
	MF	(Azerbaijan) AZE	Narvik Sirkhayev	1	0	1	0	0	0
	FW	(Azerbaijan) AZE	Samir Musayev	10	4	10	4	0	0
		(Ukraine) UKR	Sergey Qribanov	7	0	7	0	0	0
		(Azerbaijan) AZE	Orxan Rəcəbov	1	0	1	0	0	0
Players who appeared for Olimpik Baku and left during the season:
21	FW	(Azerbaijan) AZE	Javid Huseynov	3	0	3	0	0	0

=== Goal scorers ===
Place	Position	Nation	Number	Name	Premier League	Azerbaijan Cup	Total
1	FW	(Brazil)	8	Junivan	11	0	11
2	FW	(Azerbaijan)		Samir Musayev	4	0	4
2	MF	(Azerbaijan)	10	Fábio	3	1	4
2	FW	(Azerbaijan)	16	Farrukh Ismayilov	2	2	4
5	DF	(Serbia)	5	Dragan Mandic	2	0	2
5	FW	(Guinea)	21	Pathé Bangoura	2	0	2
7	DF	(Azerbaijan)	3	Nduka Usim	1	0	1
7	MF	(Azerbaijan)	77	Yashar Abuzerov	1	0	1
7	MF	(Serbia)	9	Jovan Drobnjak	1	0	1
7	DF	(North Macedonia)		Bilal Velija	1	0	1
7	FW	(Belarus)	19	Dmitri Parkhachev	0	1	1
7	DF	(Azerbaijan)	2	Ilyas Gurbanov	0	1	1
7				Own goal	1	0	1
				Unknown	0	4	4
				TOTALS	29	9	38

== Notes ==
- Qarabağ have played their home games at the Tofiq Bahramov Stadium since 1993 due to the ongoing situation in Quzanlı.
