= 2011–12 AZAL PFC season =

AZAL
2011–12 season
- Chairman: Zaur Akhundov
- Manager: Nazim Suleymanov until 7 July 2011; Elkhan Abdullayev; 12 July – 31 October 2011; Rafig Mirzayev; 1 November 2011 – 2 April 2012; Mais Azimov (caretaker) 2–6 April 2012; Vagif Sadygov from 6 April 2011
- Stadium: AZAL Arena
- Premier League: 7th
- Azerbaijan Cup: Quarter-finals vs Baku
- Europa League: 1st Qualifying Round vs Minsk
- Top goalscorer: League: Tales Schutz; Zouhir Benouahi (10); All: Zouhir Benouahi (11)
- Highest home attendance: 2,800 vs Khazar; 14 August 2011
- Lowest home attendance: 100 vs Turan; 12 May 2012
- Average home league attendance: 887
Home colours	Away colours

The AZAL 2011–12 season was AZAL's seventh Azerbaijan Premier League season. AZAL finished the season in 7th place and were knocked out of the 2011–12 Azerbaijan Cup by FK Baku in the Quarter-finals and by FC Minsk of Belarus in the 1st Qualifying Round of the 2011–12 UEFA Europa League.

Nazim Suleymanov resigned as manager of AZAL during preseason, being replaced by Elkhan Abdullayev, who himself resigned in October, being replaced by Rafig Mirzayev. Mirzayev was the manager for 6 months before having his contract terminated by mutual consent in April 2012. Mais Azimov was appointed as a caretaker manager for one game before Vagif Sadygov was appointed manager on 6 April 2012. The team's kit was supplied by Umbro and their sponsor was Silk Way.

== Squad ==
As of 7 February 2012

Note: Flags indicate national team as defined under FIFA eligibility rules; some limited exceptions apply. Players may hold more than one non-FIFA nationality.

No.	Pos.	Nation	Player
1	GK	AZE	Amil Ağacanov
2	DF	MKD	Robert Petrov
3	DF	AZE	Nduka Usim (2nd vice-captain)
5	DF	AZE	Aqil Nabiyev (captain)
6	DF	LTU	Mindavgas Daunoraviçius
7	MF	AZE	Tarlan Xalilov
8	FW	AZE	Əlşan Məmmədov
10	MF	RUS	Nuqzar Kvirtiya
11	MF	MAR	Zunair Benüahi
12	GK	AZE	Cəhangir Hasanzadə (1st vice-captain)
13	DF	AZE	Şəhriyar Rəhimov (on loan from Inter Baku)

No.	Pos.	Nation	Player
14	MF	AZE	Orxan Safiyəroğlu
15	FW	MDA	Georqiy Boğiu
16	DF	SRB	Branişlav Arsənijeviç
17	MF	NGR	Viktor İqbekoyi
19	MF	AZE	Hüseyn Axundov
20	MF	KOS	Mənsur Limanı
22	MF	AZE	Elqun Abbaslı
23	FW	BRA	Tales Şutz
25	DF	AZE	Tural Nərimanov (on loan from Neftchi Baku)
88	MF	ALB	Ervin Bulku

== Transfers ==
=== Summer ===
In: Note: Flags indicate national team as defined under FIFA eligibility rules; some limited exceptions apply. Players may hold more than one non-FIFA nationality.

No.	Pos.	Nation	Player
1	GK	AZE	Amil Agajanov (from (Azerbaijan) Mughan)
6	DF	LTU	Mindaugas Daunoravičius (from (Lithuania) Tauras)
8	FW	AZE	Elshan Mammadov (from (Azerbaijan) Mughan)
15	FW	MDA	Gheorghe Boghiu (from (Moldova) Milsami)
16	DF	SRB	Branislav Arsenijević (from (Bosnia and Herzegovina) Sarajevo)
23	FW	BRA	Tales Schutz (from (Hong Kong) South China AA)
25	FW	ARG	Christian Ruiz (from (Bolivia) The Strongest)
88	MF	ALB	Ervin Bulku (from (Croatia) Hajduk Split)

Out: Note: Flags indicate national team as defined under FIFA eligibility rules; some limited exceptions apply. Players may hold more than one non-FIFA nationality.

No.	Pos.	Nation	Player
6	DF	LAT	Ritus Krjauklis (to (Latvia) FK Liepājas Metalurgs)
8	FW	ALB	Eleandro Pema (to (Albania) KS Kamza)
13	MF	SRB	Dragan Mandić (retired)
14	DF	AZE	Elvin Aliyev (to (Azerbaijan) FK Baku)
15	FW	LTU	Gvidas Juska (to (Lithuania) Banga)
20	FW	BLR	Gennadi Bliznyuk (to (Belarus) Belshina)
21	MF	SRB	Mirko Bunjevčević (to (Serbia) Zemun)
22	MF	AZE	Anar Hasanov (to (Azerbaijan) FK Karvan)
24	FW	BUL	Enyo Krastovchev (to (Azerbaijan) Inter Baku)
96	GK	AZE	Elshan Poladov (to (Azerbaijan) FC Kəpəz)

=== Winter ===
In: Note: Flags indicate national team as defined under FIFA eligibility rules; some limited exceptions apply. Players may hold more than one non-FIFA nationality.

No.	Pos.	Nation	Player
13	DF	AZE	Shahriyar Rahimov (on loan from (Azerbaijan) Inter Baku)
25	DF	AZE	Tural Narimanov (on loan from (Azerbaijan) Neftchi Baku)

Out: Note: Flags indicate national team as defined under FIFA eligibility rules; some limited exceptions apply. Players may hold more than one non-FIFA nationality.

No.	Pos.	Nation	Player
9	MF	AZE	Vusal Garayev (to (Azerbaijan) Ravan Baku)
23	MF	NGR	Pius Ikedia (to (Northern Cyprus) Mağusa Türk Gücü)
25	FW	ARG	Cristian Ruiz (to (Colombia) Deportivo Pereira)}

== Competitions ==
=== Azerbaijan Premier League ===
==== Results summary ====
Overall								Home						Away					
Pld	W	D	L	GF	GA	GD	Pts	W	D	L	GF	GA	GD	W	D	L	GF	GA	GD
22	8	5	9	35	35	0	29	7	1	3	26	16	+10	1	4	6	9	19	−10

Last updated: 13 August 2011.
Source: Soccerway

==== Results by round ====
Round	1	2	3	4	5	6	7	8	9	10	11	12	13	14	15	16	17	18	19	20	21	22
Ground	A	H	A	H	A	H	H	A	A	H	A	H	H	A	H	A	H	A	A	H	A	H
Result	W	L	D	W	L	D	L	D	D	L	L	W	W	D	W	L	W	L	L	W	L	W
Position																						7

Source: Soccerway
A = Away; H = Home; W = Win; D = Draw; L = Loss

==== Results ====
7 August 2011 1	Simurq	0–3	AZAL	Zaqatala City Stadium
20:00 AZST (UTC+5)	Shemonayev (red card) 67'	Summary	Benouahi 17', 46'; Ramaldanov 90+3' (o.g.); Igbekoyi (yellow card) 13' (red card) 40'	Attendance: 2,000; Referee: Ramil Diniyev

14 August 2011 2	AZAL	0–3	Khazar Lankaran	AZAL Stadium
20:00 AZST (UTC+5)		Summary	Piţ 13'; Opara 61', 75'	Attendance: 2,800; Referee: Fariz Yusifov

18 August 2011 3	Gabala	1–1	AZAL	Gabala City Stadium
17:00 AZST (UTC+5)	Shukurov (red card) 11'; Burton 50'	summary	Igbekoyi 43'	Attendance: 1,000; Referee: Aliyar Agayev

27 August 2011 4	AZAL	3–1	Neftchi Baku	AZAL Stadium
19:00 AZST (UTC+5)	Mammadov 45', 72'; Bulku 56'	Summary	Georgievski 57'	Attendance: 1,400; Referee: Fariz Yusifov

11 September 2011 5	Kəpəz	3–1	AZAL	Ganja City Stadium
17:00 AZST (UTC+5)	Karimov 1'; Feutchine 36'; Fomenko 81'	Summary	Bulku 45+2'	Attendance: 15,000; Referee: Aliyar Ağayev

17 September 2011 6	AZAL	1–1	Inter Baku	AZAL Stadium
19:00 AZST (UTC+5)	Boghiu 49'	Summary	Levin 87'	Attendance: 2,000; Referee: Rovshan Ahmadov

23 September 2011 7	AZAL	1–3	Qarabağ	AZAL Stadium
18:00 AZST (UTC+5)	Boghiu 3'	Summary	Arsenijević 15' (o.g.); Adamia 21', 77'; Adamia (yellow card) 41' (yellow-red card) 82'	Attendance: 1,100; Referee: Anar Salmanov

29 September 2011 8	Baku	0–0	AZAL	Tofig Bahramov Stadium
18:00 AZST (UTC+5)		Summary		Attendance: 420; Referee: Vusal Aliyev

15 October 2011 9	Turan Tovuz	0–0	AZAL	Tovuz City Stadium
15:00 AZST (UTC+5)	Beriashvili (red card) 45+1'	Summary		Attendance: 1,500; Referee: Ramil Diniyev

22 October 2011 10	AZAL	1–2	Ravan Baku	AZAL Stadium
17:00 AZST (UTC+5)	Mammadov 35'	Summary	Zečević 27'; Hodžić 89'	Attendance: 1,100; Referee: Elchin Mämmädov

30 October 2011 11	Sumgayit	2–1	AZAL	Mehdi Huseynzade Stadium
14:00 AZT (UTC+4)	Abdulov 5'; Mammadov 33'	Summary	Schutz 70'	Attendance: 500; Referee: Rauf Jabbarov

5 November 2011 12	AZAL	3–0	Gabala	AZAL Stadium
16:00 AZT (UTC+4)	Schutz 50', 69'; Khalilov 90'	Summary		Attendance: 1,000; Referee: Anar Salmanov

19 November 2011 13	AZAL	2–0	Kəpəz	AZAL Stadium
16:00 AZT (UTC+4)	Arsenijević 38'; Schutz 59'	Summary		Attendance: 1000; Referee: Fariz Yusifov

25 November 2011 14	Inter Baku	1–1	AZAL	Shafa Stadium
18:00 AZT (UTC+4)	Zargarov 54'	Summary	Schutz 10'	Attendance: 1,600; Referee: Rovshan Ahmadov

4 December 2011 15	AZAL	1–0	Baku	AZAL Stadium
16:00 AZT (UTC+4)	Schutz 16'; Khalilov (yellow card) 79' (yellow-red card) 86'	Summary		Attendance: 1000; Referee: Anar Salmanov

11 December 2011 16	Neftchi Baku	7–1	AZAL	Ismat Gayibov Stadium
14:00 AZT (UTC+4)	Kvirtiya 3' (o.g.); Nasimov 11' (pen.), 19', 32'; Huseynov 52'; Flavinho 56'; Georgievski 77'	Summary	Benouahi 64'	Attendance: 2,000; Referee: Aliyar Ağayev

14 December 2011 17	AZAL	5–1	Simurq	AZAL Stadium
16:00 AZT (UTC+4)	Mammadov 17'; Benouahi 19' (pen.); Schutz 49', 53'; Boghiu 90+2'	Summary	Poškus 68'	Attendance: 950; Referee: Anar Salmanov

20 December 2011 18	Ravan Baku	3–1	AZAL	Dalga Arena
15:00 AZT (UTC+4)	Huseynov 34'; Barlay 45+1'; Igor Souza 60'	Summary	Benouahi 70'	Attendance: 200; Referee: Rauf Jabbarov

15 February 2012 19	Khazar Lankaran	1–0	AZAL	Lankaran City Stadium
16:00 AZT (UTC+4)	Amirguliev 74'	Summary		Attendance: 6,500; Referee: Fariz Yusifov

21 February 2012 20	AZAL	3–2	Turan Tovuz	AZAL Stadium
14:00 AZT (UTC+4)	Benouahi 1', 71'; Boghiu 78'	Summary	Nabiyev 38'; Huseynov 90'	Attendance: 200; Referee: Alik Yunusov

2 March 2012 21	Qarabağ	1–0	AZAL	Guzanli Olympic Stadium
14:30 AZT (UTC+4)	Aliyev 80'	Summary		Attendance: 2,000; Referee: Rahim Hasanov

7 March 2012 22	AZAL	6–3	Sumgayit	AZAL Stadium
14:00 AZT (UTC+4)	Schutz 30', 71'; Benouahi 33', 53'; Arsenijević 55'; Khalilov 72'	Summary	Aliyev 54'; Pamuk 76'; Mustafayev 78' (pen.)	Attendance: 300; Referee: Elvin Askerov

==== Table ====
Pos	Team	Pld	W	D	L	GF	GA	GD	Pts	Qualification
5	Baku	22	10	5	7	27	22	+5	35	Qualification for championship group
6	Gabala	22	10	5	7	27	23	+4	35	Qualification for championship group
7	AZAL	22	8	5	9	35	35	0	29	Qualification for relegation group
8	Ravan Baku	22	6	7	9	23	29	−6	25	Qualification for relegation group
9	Kapaz	22	6	4	12	26	38	−12	22	Qualification for relegation group

Source: Soccerway: Azerbaijan Premier League Table
Rules for classification: 1) points; 2) goal difference; 3) number of goals scored.

=== Azerbaijan Premier League Relegation Group ===
==== Results summary ====
Overall								Home						Away					
Pld	W	D	L	GF	GA	GD	Pts	W	D	L	GF	GA	GD	W	D	L	GF	GA	GD
10	4	3	3	9	9	0	15	2	3	0	5	2	+3	2	0	3	4	7	−3

Last updated: 21 December 2011.
Source: Soccerway

==== Results by round ====
Round	1	2	3	4	5	6	7	8	9	10
Ground	A	A	H	A	H	H	A	H	A	H
Result	L	L	W	W	D	D	W	D	L	W
Position	7	8	7	7	7	7	7	7	7	7

Source: Soccerway
A = Away; H = Home; W = Win; D = Draw; L = Loss

==== Results ====
11 March 2012 23	Turan	3–0	AZAL	Tovuz
14:00 AZT (UTC+4)	Erdoğdu 10'; Agamammadli 16' (o.g.); Islamov 48' (o.g.)	Summary		Stadium: Tovuz City Stadium; Attendance: 800; Referee: Fuad Hasanov

18 March 2012 24	Ravan Baku	2–0	AZAL	Baku
16:00 AZT (UTC+4)	Hodžić 18'; Novruzov 41' (pen.)	Summary		Stadium: Dalga Arena; Attendance: 200; Referee: Alik Yunusov

24 March 2012 25	AZAL	2–0	Kəpəz	Baku
14:00 AZT (UTC+4)	Kvirtia 59'; Boghiu 72'	Summary		Stadium: AZAL Stadium; Attendance: 500; Referee: Elchin Mämmädov

1 April 2012 26	Simurq	1–2	AZAL	Zaqatala
16:00 AZST (UTC+5)	Tarasovs 24'	Summary	Safiyaroglu 27'; Kvirtiya 61'	Stadium: Zaqatala City Stadium; Attendance: 300; Referee: Orkhan Mämmädov

8 April 2012 27	AZAL	1–1	Sumgayit	Baku
17:00 AZST (UTC+5)	Nabiyev (yellow card) 40' (yellow-red card) 79'; Igbekoyi (yellow card) 55' (red card) 55'; Bulku 87'	Summary	E.Guliyev 54' (pen.); T.Guliyev (yellow card) 15' (yellow-red card) 74'	Stadium: AZAL Stadium; Attendance: 200; Referee: Rahim Hasanov

14 April 2012 28	AZAL	1–1	Ravan Baku	Baku
16:00 AZST (UTC+5)	Benouahi 58'	Summary	Hodžić 47'	Stadium: AZAL Arena; Attendance: 300; Referee: Elvin Askerov

22 April 2012 29	Kəpəz	0–2	AZAL	Tovuz
16:00 AZST (UTC+5)		Summary	Allahguliyev 55' (o.g.); Narimanov 65'	Stadium: Tovuz City Stadium; Attendance: 3,000; Referee: Vusal Aliyev

29 April 2012 30	AZAL	0–0	Simurq	Baku
18:15 AZST (UTC+5)		Summary		Stadium: AZAL Arena; Attendance: 250; Referee: Orkhan Mämmädov

6 May 2012 31	Sumgayit	1–0	AZAL	Sumgayit
17:30 AZST (UTC+5)	Hasanov 83'	Summary		Stadium: Mehdi Huseynzade Stadium; Attendance: 135; Referee: Rauf Jabbarov

12 May 2012 32	AZAL	1–0	Turan	Baku
17:30 AZST (UTC+5)	Safiyaroglu 10'; Schutz (yellow card) 35' (yellow-red card) 75'	Summary		Stadium: AZAL Arena; Attendance: 100; Referee: Elvin Askerov

==== Table ====
Pos	Team	Pld	W	D	L	GF	GA	GD	Pts	Qualification or relegation
7	AZAL	32	12	8	12	44	44	0	44	
8	Ravan Baku	32	10	11	11	39	39	0	41	
9	Simurq	32	8	10	14	27	41	−14	34	
10	Kapaz	32	9	5	18	35	55	−20	32	
11	Turan (R)	32	6	7	19	26	42	−16	25	Qualification for relegation playoffs
12	Sumgayit (R)	32	6	6	20	27	52	−25	24	Relegation to Azerbaijan First Division

Source: Soccerway.com
Rules for classification: 1) points; 2) goal difference; 3) number of goals scored.
(R) Relegated

=== Azerbaijan Cup ===
30 November 2011 Last 16	AZAL	2–0	Shahdag	Baku
16:00 AZT (UTC+4)	Benouahi 65'; Kvirtiya 90'	Summary		Stadium: AZAL Arena; Attendance: 500; Referee: Orkhan Mämmädov

14 March 2012 Quarter-finals 1st leg	Baku	3–1	AZAL	Baku
15:00 AZT (UTC+4)	Šolić 27'; Česnauskis 59'; Koke 64'	Summary	Rahimov 68'	Stadium: Tofig Bahramov Stadium; Attendance: 1,000; Referee: Rahim Hasanov

28 March 2012 Quarter-finals 2nd leg	AZAL	1–2 (2–5 agg.)	Baku	Baku
16:00 AZT (UTC+4)	Kvirtiya (red card) 45+1'; Safiyaroglu 52'	Summary	Juninho 5', 85'	Stadium: AZAL Arena; Attendance: 300; Referee: Aliyar Ağayev

=== Europa League ===
==== First qualifying round ====
30 June 2011 1st leg	AZAL (Azerbaijan)	1–1	(Belarus) Minsk	Baku, Azerbaijan
20:00 AZST (UTC+5)	Igbekoyi 14'	Report	Voronkov 11'	Stadium: AZAL Stadium; Attendance: 2,900; Referee: Andris Treimanis (Latvia)

7 July 2011 2nd leg	Minsk (Belarus)	2–1 (3–2 agg.)	(Azerbaijan) AZAL	Minsk, Belarus
21:00 AZST (UTC+5)	Loshankov 5'; Sascheko 11'	Report	Sachivko 66' (o.g.); Usim (red card) 46'	Stadium: Dynama Stadium; Attendance: 3,000; Referee: Angel Angelov (Bulgaria)

== Squad statistics ==
=== Appearances and goals ===
As of 14 May 2012

No.	Pos	Nat	Player	Total		Premier League		Azerbaijan Cup		Europa League	
No.	Pos	Nat	Player	Apps	Goals	Apps	Goals	Apps	Goals	Apps	Goals
1	GK	(Azerbaijan) AZE	Amil Agajanov	12	0	10+0	0	1+1	0	0+0	0
2	DF	(North Macedonia) MKD	Robert Petrov	30	0	24+1	0	3+0	0	2+0	0
3	DF	(Azerbaijan) AZE	Nduka Usim	32	0	28+0	0	2+0	0	2+0	0
5	DF	(Azerbaijan) AZE	Agil Nabiyev	23	0	18+0	0	3+0	0	2+0	0
6	DF	(Lithuania) LTU	Mindaugas Daunoravičius	14	0	8+5	0	1+0	0	0+0	0
7	MF	(Azerbaijan) AZE	Tarlan Khalilov	32	2	15+14	2	1+0	0	2+0	0
8	FW	(Azerbaijan) AZE	Elshan Mammadov	25	4	15+6	4	1+1	0	0+2	0
10	MF	(Russia) RUS	Nugzar Kvirtiya	33	3	26+2	2	2+1	1	1+1	0
11	MF	(Morocco) MAR	Zouhir Benouahi	30	11	23+2	10	3+0	1	2+0	0
12	GK	(Azerbaijan) AZE	Jahangir Hasanzade	25	0	21+0	0	2+0	0	2+0	0
13	DF	(Azerbaijan) AZE	Shahriyar Rahimov	11	1	7+2	0	1+1	1	0+0	0
14	MF	(Azerbaijan) AZE	Orkhan Safiyaroglu	16	3	5+9	2	1+1	1	0+0	0
15	FW	(Moldova) MDA	Gheorghe Boghiu	30	5	14+13	5	3+0	0	0+0	0
16	MF	(Serbia) SRB	Branislav Arsenijević	30	2	27+0	2	3+0	0	0+0	0
17	MF	(Nigeria) NGR	Victor Igbekoyi	29	2	24+0	1	2+1	0	2+0	1
18	FW	(Azerbaijan) AZE	Elmin Chobanov	1	0	0+1	0	0+0	0	0+0	0
19	MF	(Azerbaijan) AZE	Huseyn Akhundov	23	0	11+10	0	0+1	0	1+0	0
20	MF	(Kosovo) KOS	Mensur Limani	17	0	9+5	0	1+0	0	2+0	0
22	MF	(Azerbaijan) AZE	Elgun Abbasli	3	0	0+3	0	0+0	0	0+0	0
23	FW	(Brazil) BRA	Tales Schutz	23	10	20+2	10	1+0	0	0+0	0
25	DF	(Azerbaijan) AZE	Tural Narimanov	10	1	8+2	1	0+0	0	0+0	0
88	MF	(Albania) ALB	Ervin Bulku	24	3	20+2	3	2+0	0	0+0	0
Players who appeared for AZAL no longer at the club:
6	DF	(Latvia) LAT	Ritus Krjauklis	1	0	0+0	0	0+0	0	1+0	0
9	MF	(Azerbaijan) AZE	Vusal Garayev	9	0	5+2	0	1+0	0	0+1	0
23	MF	(Nigeria) NGR	Pius Ikedia	2	0	0+0	0	0+0	0	1+1	0
24	FW	(Bulgaria) BUL	Enyo Krastovchev	4	0	2+0	0	0+0	0	2+0	0
25	FW	(Argentina) ARG	Cristian Ruiz	7	0	2+5	0	0+0	0	0+0	0

=== Goal scorers ===
Place	Position	Nation	Number	Name	Premier League	Azerbaijan Cup	Europa League	Total
1	MF	(Morocco)	11	Zouhir Benouahi	10	1	0	11
2	FW	(Brazil)	23	Tales Schutz	10	0	0	10
3	MF	(Azerbaijan)	8	Elshan Mammadov	4	0	0	4
3	FW	(Moldova)	15	Gheorghe Boghiu	5	0	0	5
5	MF	(Russia)	10	Nugzar Kvirtiya	2	1	0	3
5	MF	(Albania)	88	Ervin Bulku	3	0	0	3
5	DF	(Azerbaijan)	14	Orkhan Safiyaroglu	2	1	0	3
5				Own goal	2	0	1	3
9	MF	(Nigeria)	17	Victor Igbekoyi	1	0	1	2
9	MF	(Serbia)	16	Branislav Arsenijević	2	0	0	2
9	MF	(Azerbaijan)	7	Tarlan Khalilov	2	0	0	2
12	DF	(Azerbaijan)	13	Tural Narimanov	1	0	0	1
12	DF	(Azerbaijan)	13	Shahriyar Rahimov	0	1	0	1
				TOTALS	43	4	2	49

=== Disciplinary record ===
Number	Nation	Position	Name	Premier League		Azerbaijan Cup		Europa League		Total	
Number	Nation	Position	Name	Yellow card	Red card	Yellow card	Red card	Yellow card	Red card	Yellow card	Red card
1	(Azerbaijan)	GK	Amil Agajanov	3	0	0	0	0	0	3	0
2	(North Macedonia)	DF	Robert Petrov	7	0	0	0	0	0	7	0
3	(Azerbaijan)	DF	Nduka Usim	6	0	0	0	1	1	7	1
5	(Azerbaijan)	DF	Agil Nabiyev	7	1	1	0	1	0	9	1
6	(Lithuania)	DF	Mindaugas Daunoravičius	4	0	0	0	0	0	4	0
7	(Azerbaijan)	MF	Tarlan Khalilov	2	1	0	0	0	0	2	1
8	(Azerbaijan)	FW	Elshan Mammadov	2	0	0	0	0	0	2	0
10	(Russia)	MF	Nugzar Kvirtiya	3	0	0	1	0	0	3	1
11	(Morocco)	MF	Zouhir Benouahi	8	0	0	0	1	0	9	0
12	(Azerbaijan)	GK	Jahangir Hasanzade	2	0	0	0	0	0	2	0
13	(Azerbaijan)	DF	Shahriyar Rahimov	3	0	1	0	0	0	4	0
14	(Azerbaijan)	MF	Orkhan Safiyaroglu	1	0	0	0	0	0	1	0
15	(Moldova)	FW	Gheorghe Boghiu	2	0	1	0	0	0	3	0
16	(Serbia)	MF	Branislav Arsenijević	1	0	1	0	0	0	2	0
17	(Nigeria)	MF	Victor Igbekoyi	6	2	2	0	1	0	9	2
19	(Azerbaijan)	MF	Huseyn Akhundov	2	0	0	0	0	0	2	0
20	(Kosovo)	MF	Mensur Limani	2	0	0	0	0	0	2	0
22	(Azerbaijan)	MF	Elgun Abbasli	1	0	0	0	0	0	1	0
23	(Brazil)	FW	Tales Schutz	8	1	0	0	0	0	8	1
25	(Azerbaijan)	DF	Tural Narimanov	3	0	0	0	0	0	3	0
25	(Argentina)	FW	Cristian Ruiz	1	0	0	0	0	0	1	0
88	(Albania)	MF	Ervin Bulku	8	0	1	0	0	0	9	0
			TOTALS	82	5	7	1	4	1	93	7
