= Elshan Mamedov =

Azerbaijani footballer (born 1980)

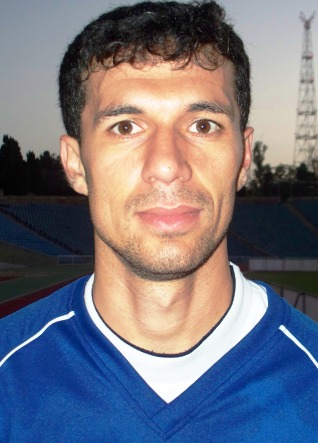

Personal information
- Date of birth: 4 May 1980 (age 46)
- Place of birth: Baku, Azerbaijan SSR
- Height: 1.76 m (5 ft 9 in)
- Position: Forward

Team information
- Current team: Sharurspor
- Number: 99

Senior career*
| Years | Team | Apps | (Gls) |
| 2000–2007 | Inter Baku | 112 | (21) |
| 2007 | Standard Baku | 8 | (1) |
| 2008 | Karabakh | 8 | (1) |
| 2008–2010 | Simurq | 51 | (13) |
| 2010–2011 | Mughan | 23 | (4) |
| 2011–2013 | AZAL | 26 | (4) |
| 2016– | Sharurspor | 1 | (0) |

International career^{‡}
| 2006–2011 | Azerbaijan | 6 | (0) |
- * Club domestic league appearances and goals as of 20 February 2016 ‡ National team caps and goals as of 27 April 2013

Elshan Mamedov (Azerbaijani: Elşən Məmmədov; born 4 May 1980 in Baku) is an Azerbaijani football player who currently plays for Sharurspor PFK as a forward.

== Career statistics ==
As of 6 August 2013

| Club performance | | | League | | Cup | | Continental | | Total | |
| Season | Club | League | Apps | Goals | Apps | Goals | Apps | Goals | Apps | Goals |
| Azerbaijan | | | League | | Azerbaijan Cup | | Europe | | Total | |
|---|---|---|---|---|---|---|---|---|---|---|
| 2000–01 | Inter Baku | Azerbaijan Premier League | 0 | 0 | | | — | | 0 | 0 |
| 2001–02 | Inter Baku | Azerbaijan Premier League | 19 | 2 | | | — | | 19 | 2 |
| 2003–04 | Inter Baku | Azerbaijan Premier League | 18 | 5 | | | — | | 18 | 5 |
| 2004–05 | Inter Baku | Azerbaijan Premier League | 32 | 10 | | | — | | 32 | 10 |
| 2005–06 | Inter Baku | Azerbaijan Premier League | 22 | 3 | | | — | | 22 | 3 |
| 2006–07 | Inter Baku | Azerbaijan Premier League | 21 | 2 | | | — | | 21 | 2 |
| 2007–08 | Standard Baku | Azerbaijan Premier League | 8 | 1 | | | — | | 8 | 1 |
| 2007–08 | Karabakh | Azerbaijan Premier League | 8 | 1 | | | — | | 8 | 1 |
| 2008–09 | Simurq | Azerbaijan Premier League | 21 | 6 | | | — | | 21 | 6 |
| 2009–10 | Simurq | Azerbaijan Premier League | 30 | 7 | 2 | 0 | — | | 32 | 7 |
| 2010–11 | Mughan | Azerbaijan Premier League | 23 | 4 | 1 | 0 | — | | 24 | 4 |
| 2011–12 | AZAL | Azerbaijan Premier League | 22 | 4 | 2 | 0 | 2 | 0 | 26 | 4 |
| 2012–13 | AZAL | Azerbaijan Premier League | 4 | 0 | 0 | 0 | — | | 4 | 0 |
| Total | Azerbaijan | | 228 | 45 | | | 2 | 0 | 230 | 45 |
| Career total | | | 228 | 45 | | | 2 | 0 | 230 | 45 |
