= Junivan =

Brazilian footballer

Personal information
- Full name: Junivan Soares de Melo
- Date of birth: 20 November 1977 (age 48)
- Place of birth: Manaus, Amazonas, Brazil
- Height: 1.80 m (5 ft 11 in)
- Position: Forward

Senior career*
Years	Team	Apps	(Gls)
?–2001	Heliópolis		
2001	→ Lokomotiv Plovdiv (loan)		
2002–2004	→ PFC Belasitsa Petrich (loan)		
2005	→ Slavia Sofia (loan)	4	(0)
2005	Turan Tovuz	12	(8)
2006	Kayseri Erciyesspor	2	(0)
2006–2007	PFC Belasitsa Petrich	12	(2)
2007–2009	Olimpik Baku	43	(17)
2009–2010	Turan Tovuz	14	(0)
2010	Olimpik-Shuvalan	12	(0)
2010–2012	Kapaz	58	(15)
- * Club domestic league appearances and goals

Junivan Soares de Melo (born 20 November 1977), known as just Junivan, is a Brazilian former professional footballer who played as a forward.

== Career statistics ==
As of 15 August 2013

Appearances and goals by club, season and competition
Club	Season	League			National cup		Continental		Total	
Club	Season	Division	Apps	Goals	Apps	Goals	Apps	Goals	Apps	Goals
Belasitsa Petrich (loan)	2003–04	A Group	13	7			–		13	7
Belasitsa Petrich (loan)	2004–05	A Group	11	1			–		11	1
Slavia Sofia (loan)	2004–05	A Group	4	0			–		4	0
Turan Tovuz	2005–06	Azerbaijan Premier League	12	8			–		12	8
Kayseri Erciyesspor	2005–06	Süper Lig	2	0	2	0	–		4	0
Belasitsa Petrich	2006–07	A Group	12	2			–		12	2
Olimpik Baku	2007–08	Azerbaijan Premier League	21	11			–		21	11
Olimpik Baku	2008–09	Azerbaijan Premier League	22	6			0	0	22	6
Turan Tovuz	2009–10	Azerbaijan Premier League	14	0			–		14	0
Olimpik-Shuvalan	2009–10	Azerbaijan Premier League	12	0	4	0	–		16	0
Kapaz	2010–11	Azerbaijan Premier League	29	10	1	0	–		30	10
Kapaz	2011–12	Azerbaijan Premier League	29	5	1	0	–		30	5
Career total			181	50	8	0	0	0	189	50
