= Bilal Velija =

Macedonian footballer (born 1982)

Personal information
- Date of birth: 22 October 1982 (age 44)
- Place of birth: Negotino Pološko, SFR Yugoslavia
- Height: 1.75 m (5 ft 9 in)
- Position: Defender

Senior career*
Years	Team	Apps	(Gls)
2004–2007	Shkëndija	79	(4)
2007	Porin Palloilijat	16	(3)
2008	Olimpik Baku	9	(1)
2008–2009	Besa Kavajë	12	(0)
2009–2010	Løv-Ham	35	(3)
2010–2011	Besa Kavajë	8	(1)
2011–2013	Renova	45	(0)
2013–2014	Gostivar	21	(0)
2014	JJK Jyväskylä	25	(0)
2015-2018	MuSa	73	(4)
- * Club domestic league appearances and goals

Bilal Velija (born 22 October 1982) is a North Macedonia former professional footballer who played as a defender.

== Career ==
Velija joined Olimpik Baku during the 2008 winter transfer window, helping them finish second in the 2007–08 season before leaving the club in June 2008.

In March 2009, Velija signed a two-year contract with Løv-Ham of the Adeccoligaen. Velija's time in Norway came to an end in 2010, when Løv-Ham decided to return to a semi-professional club, therefore releasing their full-time players, which included Velija.

In February 2014, Velija went on trial with Veikkausliiga side VPS, playing for them twice in the League Cup before returning to Gostivar. In April of the same year, Velija signed a six-month contract with Finnish Second Tier side JJK.

Velija joined Musan Salama of the Finnish third tier Kakkonen in 2015.

== Career statistics ==
As of 22 February 2015

Appearances and goals by club, season and competition
Club	Season	League			Cup		Other		Total	
Club	Season	Division	Apps	Goals	Apps	Goals	Apps	Goals	Apps	Goals
Olimpik Baku	2007–08	Azerbaijan Premier League	9	1			–		9	1
Besa Kavajë	2008–09	Albanian Superliga	12	0			–		12	0
Løv-Ham	2009	Adeccoligaen	27	3	2	0	–		29	3
Løv-Ham	2010	Adeccoligaen	8	0	3	1	–		11	1
Løv-Ham	Total		35	3	5	1	0	0	40	4
Besa Kavajë	2010–11	Albanian Superliga	8	1			–		8	1
Renova	2011–12	1. MFL	17	0			–		17	0
Renova	2012–13	1. MFL	28	0	2	0	2	0	32	0
Renova	Total		45	0	2	0	2	0	49	0
Gostivar	2013–14	1. MFL	21	0	0	0	–		21	0
VPS (trial)	2014	Veikkausliiga	0	0	2	0	–		2	0
JJK	2014	Ykkönen	25	0	2	0	–		27	0
Total			153	5	12	1	2	0	165	6
