= Tomislav Višević =

Bosnian Croat footballer

Personal information
- Full name: Tomislav Višević
- Date of birth: 9 December 1980 (age 45)
- Place of birth: Karlsruhe, West Germany
- Height: 1.83 m (6 ft 0 in)
- Position: Defender

Senior career*
Years	Team	Apps	(Gls)
2000-2001	Cibalia	3	(0)
2001–2002	Posušje	28	(0)
2002–2004	Metalurh Zaporizhzhia	32	(1)
2004	→ Metalurh-2 Zaporizhzhia	2	(0)
2004–2005	Neftçi	15	(0)
2005	Olimpik Baku	11	(0)
2006	Posušje	13	(1)
2006–2007	Zagłębie Lubin	10	(0)
2007-2009	Osijek	35	(1)
2010	Vinogradar	8	(0)
- * Club domestic league appearances and goals

Tomislav Višević (born December 9, 1980, in Karlsruhe, West Germany) is a Bosnian Croat former professional footballer who played as a defender.

== Club career ==
During his career he played for clubs from Croatia, Bosnia and Herzegovina, Azerbaijan, Ukraine and Poland.

== Honours ==
Zagłębie Lubin

- Ekstraklasa: 2006–07
