= Nduka Usim =

Azerbaijani footballer (born 1985)

Personal information
- Full name: Nduka Charles Usim
- Date of birth: 23 March 1985 (age 41)
- Place of birth: Lagos, Nigeria
- Height: 1.78 m (5 ft 10 in)
- Position: Defender

Senior career*
Years	Team	Apps	(Gls)
2004–2013	AZAL	208	(5)
2013	Tavşanlı Linyitspor	13	(0)
2014	Simurq	0	(0)

International career^{‡}
2007–2008	Azerbaijan	10	(0)
- * Club domestic league appearances and goals as of 6 August 2014 ‡ National team caps and goals as of 16 May 2013

Nduka Charles Usim (born 23 March 1985) is a retired footballer who played as a defender, most notably for AZAL in the Azerbaijan Premier League. Born in Nigeria, he represented Azerbaijan at international level.

== Career ==
=== Club ===
Nduka began to play football in Nigeria for the youth teams. In 2004, he went on a trial for AZAL PFC and signed a one-year contract. For the next season he renewed his contract and made his debut in Azerbaijan Premier League. Since then Nduka plays for AZAL PFC becoming most capping player with more than 200 games.

In July 2013, after 208 games for AZAL, Usim moved to TFF First League side Tavşanlı Linyitspor on a one-year contract. After only six-months in Turkey, Usim signed a six-month contract with Simurq on 25 January 2014.

=== International ===
In early 2007, Usim was called up to the Azerbaijan U21 Usim was called for Azerbaijan national football team for the games versus Finland and Belgium in UEFA Euro 2008 qualifying Group A. He also played during the 2010 World Cup qualifier matches.

== After football ==
Following his retirement from football, Usim ran a construction business in Nigeria

He is also a Registered Intermediary of the Nigerian Football Federation.

== Career statistics ==
=== Club ===
As of 25 January 2014

Club performance			League		Cup		Continental		Total	
Season	Club	League	Apps	Goals	Apps	Goals	Apps	Goals	Apps	Goals
2005–06	AZAL	Azerbaijan Premier League	22	1			—		22	1
2006–07	AZAL	Azerbaijan Premier League	22	0			—		22	0
2007–08	AZAL	Azerbaijan Premier League	26	1			—		26	1
2008–09	AZAL	Azerbaijan Premier League	24	0			2	0	26	0
2009–10	AZAL	Azerbaijan Premier League	29	0			—		29	0
2010–11	AZAL	Azerbaijan Premier League	31	3	5	0	—		36	3
2011–12	AZAL	Azerbaijan Premier League	27	0	2	0	2	0	31	0
2012–13	AZAL	Azerbaijan Premier League	27	0	1	0	—		28	0
2013–14	Tavşanlı Linyitspor	TFF First League	13	0	2	0	—		15	0
2013–14	Simurq	Azerbaijan Premier League	0	0	0	0	—		0	0
Total	Azerbaijan		208	5	8	0	4	0	220	0
Total	Turkey		13	0	2	0	0	0	15	0
Career total			221	5	10	0	4	0	235	0

=== International ===
Azerbaijan
Year	Apps	Goals
2007	3	0
2008	7	0
Total	10	0

Statistics accurate as of 6 August 2014
