= Jahangir Asgarov =

Azerbaijani pilot and aviation executive

- Cahangir Əsgərov
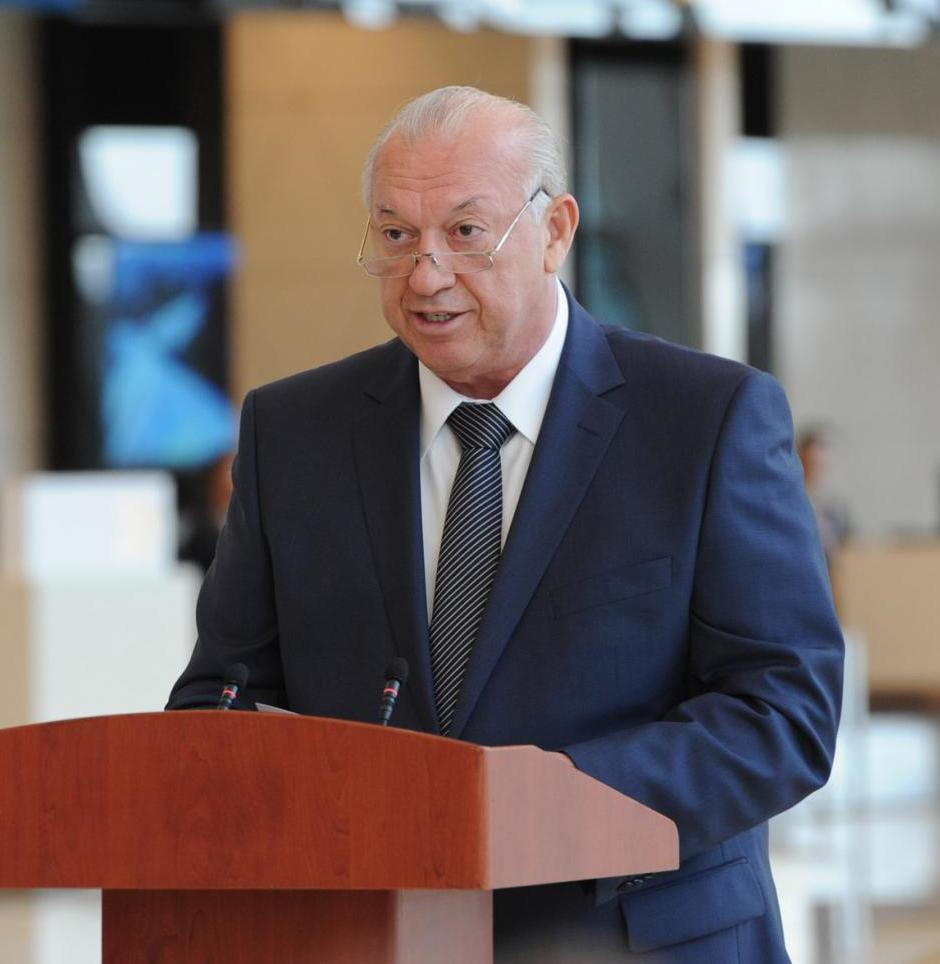

President of Azerbaijan Airlines (Note: Served as General Director of the Azerbaijan Airlines from 15 July 1996 to 1 May 2008.)
- In office 15 July 1996 – 1 September 2023
- Succeeded by: Samir Rzayev

Personal details
- Born: 11 July 1950 (age 74); Baku, Azerbaijan SSR, USSR

Jahangir Jalal oghlu Asgarov (Azerbaijani: Cahangir Cəlal oğlu Əsgərov; born 11 July 1950) is an Azerbaijani pilot and aviation executive who headed the Azerbaijan Airlines from 1996 to 2023.

== Biography ==
Jahangir Asgarov was born on 11 July 1950, in Baku, Azerbaijan, into a family of civil servants. He began his professional career in 1970 at the Baku United Aviation Group of the Azerbaijan Civil Aviation Administration. After graduating from the Kremenchuk Civil Aviation Flight School in 1972 with a specialty in piloting, he was sent to the Cherkasy United Aviation Group of the Ukrainian Civil Aviation Administration as a co-pilot of the An-2 aircraft. In the same year, he was transferred to the Zabrat United Flight Group of the Azerbaijan Civil Aviation Administration, where he served as the commander of the aviation squadron and deputy commander of the flight group until 1977. From 1978 to 1980, he served as the commander of the Yevlakh United Aviation Group and the head of the airport of the Azerbaijan Civil Aviation Administration.

In 1980, Asgarov graduated from the USSR Civil Aviation Academy named after Lenin, with a degree in engineering-pilot. Between 1980 and 1981, he worked as an instructor-pilot of the An-2 aircraft in the training group of the Azerbaijan Civil Aviation Administration. From 1981 to 1984, he performed flights as a co-pilot of the Tupolev Tu-134 in the Baku United Aviation Group. He served as the captain of the Tu-134 aircraft, deputy commander of the aviation squadron from 1984 to 1988, and was appointed the squadron commander for these aircraft types in 1988.

From 1991 to 1993, Asgarov was the president of the Azerbaijan Flight Crew Association Trade Union, and later, the chairman of the Trade Union of Azerbaijan Aviation.

From 1993 to 1996, he worked as the chief representative of the Azerbaijan Airlines State Concern in Turkey. On July 15, 1996, he was appointed as the General Director of the Azerbaijan Airlines State Concern. On 1 May 2008, he was appointed the President of the Azerbaijan Airlines Closed Joint-Stock Company. On 1 September 2023, by the decree of President of Azerbaijan, he was relieved of his duties as president of the company. He was succeeded by Samir Rzayev.

In 2004, Asgarov defended his candidate dissertation and became a candidate of technical sciences. He is a full member of the International Engineering Academy. He also served as the head of the Department of Air Transport Production at the National Aviation Academy. In 2024, he was dismissed from his position.

== Honours ==
Jahangir Asgarov received several awards and honours from Azerbaijan and foreign countries:

- Merited Pilot of Azerbaijan (31 May 2011, Azerbaijan)
- Sharaf Order (11 July 2020, Azerbaijan)
- Shohrat Order (10 July 2010, Azerbaijan)
- Order of Friendship (24 December 2007, Russia)
- Order of Prince Yaroslav the Wise, 5th class (20 November 2004, Ukraine)
- Order of Honor (13 November 2013, Georgia)
- Medal For Merits in the Field of Civil Aviation (10 May 2018, Azerbaijan)
- Jubilee Medal 75 Years (1938–2013) of Civil Aviation of Azerbaijan (2 June 2014, Azerbaijan)
- Gold Medal of the Azerbaijan Engineering Academy (3 July 2015)
