= Samir Rzayev =

Azerbaijani aviation executive

President of Azerbaijan Airlines
- Incumbent
- Assumed office 22 February 2024
- Preceded by: Jahangir Asgarov

Personal details
- Born: 9 May 1980 (age 44); Baku, Azerbaijan SSR, USSR

Samir Musa oghlu Rzayev (Azerbaijani: Samir Musa oğlu Rzayev; born 9 May 1980) is an Azerbaijani aviation executive who is the President of Azerbaijan Airlines.

== Biography ==
Samir Musa oghlu Rzayev was born on 9 May 1980, in Baku. He studied General Economics at the Azerbaijan State University of Economics, receiving his bachelor's degree in 2001 and his master's degree in 2003. To further his education, he pursued a master's degree in Finance and Investment at Durham University in the United Kingdom from 2003 to 2004.

In 2001, Samir Rzayev began his career as an economist at the Central Bank of Azerbaijan, where he worked until September 2003. Upon completing his studies abroad, he returned to the Central Bank, advancing to the role of Senior Economist from 2004 to 2005, and subsequently became the head of the Foreign Reserves Management Department from 2005 to 2007.

S.Rzayev then started working at PASHA Construction, where he was Finance Director from 2007 to 2008 and Commercial Director from 2008 to 2009. In March 2009, he was appointed Head of the Treasury Department at the Mortgage and Credit Guarantee Fund of Azerbaijan, a position he held until October 2016, followed by a tenure as Chief Financial Director of the fund until July 2017. From 2017 to 2022, Samir Rzayev held the position of Trading Director at Azerbaijan Supermarket LLC.

In February 2022, by order of the President of Azerbaijan, he was appointed vice-president of Azerbaijan Airlines Closed Joint-Stock Company. In November 2022, he was promoted to First Vice-president and temporarily assumed the role of Acting President in September 2023. On February 22, 2024, Samir Rzayev was appointed President of Azerbaijan Airlines CJSC by order of the President of Azerbaijan.

== Personal life ==
Rzayev is married and has three children.
