= Sharurspor PFK =

- Full name: Şərurspor Peşəkar Futbol Klubu
- Founded: 2015; 11 years ago
- Dissolved: 2017
- Ground: Bayil Stadium, Baku, Azerbaijan
- Capacity: 5,000
- President: Serdar Baghirov
- Manager: Mahammadali Ganiyev
- League: Azerbaijan First Division
Home colours	Away colours

Sharurspor PFK (Azerbaijani: Şərurspor Peşəkar Futbol Klubu) or Şərurspor PFK is an Azerbaijani football club based in Baku.

== History ==
The club was founded in 2015 and participated in the Azerbaijan First Division. They were relegated in 2017.

== Stadium ==
Bayil Stadium is a football stadium in the Bayil district of Baku. The stadium was one of the venues during 2012 FIFA U-17 Women's World Cup.

== 2016 squad ==
As of 7 August 2016

Note: Flags indicate national team as defined under FIFA eligibility rules; some limited exceptions apply. Players may hold more than one non-FIFA nationality.

No.	Pos.	Nation	Player
1	GK	AZE	Cavid Safarov
2	GK	AZE	Royal Alizade
3	GK	AZE	Ramil Karimov
4	DF	AZE	Abulfaz Haciyev
5	DF	AZE	Vugar Hasanli
6	DF	AZE	Cavid Heydarov
7	DF	AZE	Mehdi Rasulov
8	DF	AZE	Baghir Shahbazov
9	DF	AZE	Mehman Mammadov
10	DF	AZE	Gadir Hasanli
11	DF	AZE	Rashad Orucov
12	DF	AZE	Maharram Ahmadov

No.	Pos.	Nation	Player
13	MF	AZE	Matin Abilsoy
14	MF	AZE	Fuad Mammadzade
15	MF	AZE	Ramil Hasanov
16	MF	AZE	Anar Aghayev
17	MF	AZE	Elmaddin Huseynzade
18	MF	AZE	Afiq Yusifov
19	MF	AZE	Tarlan Khalilov
20	MF	AZE	Samir Musayev
21	FW	AZE	Boyukagha Guliyev
22	FW	AZE	Farmayil Aliyev
23	FW	AZE	Aslan Huseynov
24	FW	AZE	Joshgun Suleymanov

== Managers ==
- (Azerbaijan) Mahammadali Ganiyev (2015–)
