= 2010–11 Azerbaijan Premier League =

Azerbaijan Premier League
- Season: 2010–11
- Champions: Neftchi Baku
- Relegated: Simurq Zaqatala; MOIK Baku
- Champions League: Neftchi Baku
- Europa League: Khazar Lankaran; Qarabağ; AZAL Baku
- Matches: 192
- Goals: 302 (1.57 per match)
- Top goalscorer: Georgi Adamia (18)
- Biggest home win: AZAL 5–0 Inter
- Biggest away win: MOIK 0–5 Ganja
- Highest scoring: Neftchi 6–2 Ganja

The 2010–11 Azerbaijan Premier League (known as the Unibank Premyer Liqası for sponsorship reasons) was the nineteenth season of the top tier Azerbaijan Premier League since its establishment in 1992. The fixtures were announced on 29 July 2010; the season began on 7 August 2010 and ended on 28 May 2011. Neftchi Baku were the eventual champions, winning their first Azerbaijani championship since 2005.

The league was competed over two stages. The first stage consisted of a regular home-and-away round-robin schedule for a total of 22 matches per team. The competition was then split in half, with the teams ranked first through sixth playing out the championship and the European spots while the bottom six teams having to avoid one of the two relegation places. In contrast to the previous season, each team transferred their full record from the first to the second stage.

Adidas provided their Jabulani match ball for the season.

== Teams ==
Standard Sumgayit and Karvan had been relegated to the Azerbaijan First Division after finishing 11th and 12th, respectively, at the end of last season. They were replaced by First Division champions Ganja and runners-up MOIK Baku.

Olimpik-Shuvalan Baku were renamed AZAL Baku prior to the start of the season.

=== Stadia and locations ===
Location of teams in Azerbaijan Premier League 2010-11

Team	Location	Venue	Capacity
AZAL	Baku	AZAL Stadium	3,000
FK Baku	Baku	Tofig Bahramov Stadium	30,000
Ganja	Ganja	Ganja City Stadium	25,000
Inter	Baku	Shafa Stadium	8,150
Khazar	Lankaran	Lankaran City Stadium	15,000
MOIK Baku	Baku	MOIK Stadium	1,000
Mughan	Salyan	Salyany Olympic Stadium	2,000
Neftchi	Baku	Ismat Gayibov Stadium	5,000
Qarabağ	Aghdam	Guzanli Olympic Stadium	2,000
Gabala FC	Gabala	Gabala City Stadium	2,000
Simurq	Zaqatala	Zaqatala City Stadium	3,500
Turan	Tovuz	Tovuz City Stadium	10,000

=== Personnel and sponsoring ===
Team	Head coach	Team captain	Kitmaker	Shirt sponsor
AZAL	(Azerbaijan) Nazim Suleymanov	(Azerbaijan) Agil Nabiyev	Umbro	Silk Way
FK Baku	(Latvia) Aleksandrs Starkovs	(Azerbaijan) Jamshid Maharramov	Kappa	
FK Ganja	(Azerbaijan) Mehman Allahverdiyev	(Azerbaijan) Azer Mammadov	Adidas	
Inter	(Georgia (country)) Kakhaber Tskhadadze	(Azerbaijan) Vladimir Levin	Adidas	IBA
Khazar	(Romania) Mircea Rednic	(Azerbaijan) Kamran Agaev	Puma	Palmali
MOIK Baku	(Azerbaijan) Gahraman Aliyev	(Azerbaijan) Farid Hashimzadeh	Umbro	
Mughan	(Azerbaijan) Bahman Hasanov	(Azerbaijan) Elnur Abdullayev	Olympikus	Nissan
Neftchi	(Azerbaijan) Arif Asadov	(Azerbaijan) Rail Malikov	Adidas	SOCAR
Qarabağ	(Azerbaijan) Gurban Gurbanov	(Azerbaijan) Aslan Kerimov	Adidas	Azersun Holding
Qabala	(England) Tony Adams	(Azerbaijan) Kanan Karimov	Erreà	Hyundai
Simurq	(North Macedonia) Gjoko Hadžievski	(Azerbaijan) Rasim Ramaldanov	Umbro	
Turan	(Azerbaijan) Asgar Abdullayev	(Azerbaijan) Vurgun Huseynov	Umbro	

=== Managerial changes ===
Team	Outgoing manager	Manner of departure	Date of vacancy	Replaced by	Date of appointment
Gabala	(Azerbaijan) Ramiz Mammadov	End of contract	10 May 2010	(England) Tony Adams	12 May 2010
FK Baku	(Turkey) Cüneyt Biçer	End of contract	10 June 2010	(Germany) Winfried Schäfer	10 June 2010
Simurq PFC	(Ukraine) Roman Pokora	Sacked	18 June 2010	(North Macedonia) Gjoko Hadžievski	18 June 2010
Turan Tovuz	(Azerbaijan) Nizami Sadygov	Sacked	29 June 2010	(Azerbaijan) Sakit Aliyev	29 June 2010
Khazar Lankaran	(Azerbaijan) Agaselim Mirjavadov	Resigned	8 July 2010	(Romania) Mircea Rednic	15 July 2010
Turan Tovuz	(Azerbaijan) Sakit Aliyev	Sacked	30 September 2010	(Georgia (country)) Revaz Dzodzuashvili	30 September 2010
FK Mughan	(Bosnia and Herzegovina) Almir Hurtić	Resigned	13 November 2010	(Azerbaijan) Bahman Hasanov	13 November
Turan Tovuz	(Georgia (country)) Revaz Dzodzuashvili	End of contract	23 December 2010	(Turkey) Naci Şensoy	25 December 2010
FK Baku	(Germany) Winfried Schäfer	Sacked	6 January 2011	(Latvia) Aleksandrs Starkovs	16 January 2011
FK Ganja	(Azerbaijan) Fuad Ismayilov	Resigned	17 March 2011	(Azerbaijan) Mehman Allahverdiyev	18 March 2011
Turan Tovuz	(Turkey) Naci Şensoy	Sacked	6 May 2011	(Azerbaijan) Asgar Abdullayev	6 May 2011

== First round ==
=== League table ===
Pos	Team	Pld	W	D	L	GF	GA	GD	Pts	Qualification
1	Neftçi Baku	22	14	6	2	40	9	+31	48	Qualification for championship group
2	Khazar Lankaran	22	14	5	3	28	12	+16	47	Qualification for championship group
3	Qarabağ	22	13	3	6	30	14	+16	42	Qualification for championship group
4	Inter Baku	22	12	4	6	24	16	+8	40	Qualification for championship group
5	AZAL	22	9	9	4	27	16	+11	36	Qualification for championship group
6	Baku	22	9	6	7	28	21	+7	33	Qualification for championship group
7	Gabala	22	8	7	7	19	14	+5	31	Qualification for relegation group
8	Mughan	22	7	6	9	14	23	−9	27	Qualification for relegation group
9	Ganja	22	5	9	8	23	27	−4	24	Qualification for relegation group
10	Turan	22	3	6	13	17	35	−18	15	Qualification for relegation group
11	Simurq	22	2	6	14	12	34	−22	12	Qualification for relegation group
12	MOIK Baku	22	1	3	18	6	47	−41	6	Qualification for relegation group

Source: Soccerway.com
Rules for classification: 1) points; 2) goal difference; 3) number of goals scored.

=== Results ===
Home \ Away	AZL	BAK	GAN	INT	KHA	MOI	MUG	NEF	QAR	GAB	SIM	TUR
AZAL		0–0	0–0	5–0	0–1	2–0	2–0	0–0	2–0	2–2	2–1	1–0
Baku	2–3		1–1	1–2	1–1	2–1	1–1	0–2	2–0	2–1	0–1	3–1
Ganja	1–1	1–3		1–0	4–1	1–0	3–0	0–4	0–1	0–0	1–1	1–1
Inter Baku	1–1	1–0	1–0		1–3	1–0	1–0	0–2	1–0	0–0	2–0	3–0
Khazar Lankaran	2–1	1–1	1–0	0–0		3–0	2–0	1–0	1–2	1–0	1–0	2–0
MOIK Baku	1–1	0–4	0–5	0–4	0–2		3–2	0–4	0–1	0–3	0–2	0–2
Mughan	3–1	1–0	1–1	1–0	0–0	1–0		0–3	0–0	1–0	1–0	0–0
Neftçi Baku	1–0	0–2	6–2	1–1	0–0	1–0	1–0		1–1	0–0	4–0	2–0
Qarabağ	0–0	2–0	3–0	1–0	0–1	3–0	2–0	0–1		3–0	3–2	5–1
Gabala	0–0	0–1	0–0	0–1	1–0	0–0	2–0	0–2	2–1		4–0	1–0
Simurq	0–1	1–1	0–0	0–1	0–2	1–1	0–1	0–3	0–1	0–2		2–2
Turan	1–2	0–1	2–1	0–3	1–2	2–0	1–1	2–2	0–1	0–1	1–1	

Source: Soccerway.com
Legend: Blue = home team win; Yellow = draw; Red = away team win.

== Second round ==
The league was split into two groups; however, each team retained its record from the first round.

=== Championship group ===
The top six teams of the first phase participate in this group, which will decide which team will win the championship. Additionally, teams in this group compete for one 2011–12 Champions League and two Europa League spots.

The winners will qualify for the Champions League Second qualifying round, with the runners-up and third place team earning a spot in the Europa League first qualifying round.

==== Table ====
Pos	Team	Pld	W	D	L	GF	GA	GD	Pts	Qualification
1	Neftçi Baku (C)	32	19	10	3	53	17	+36	67	Qualification for Champions League second qualifying round
2	Khazar Lankaran	32	16	12	4	38	18	+20	60	Qualification for Europa League second qualifying round (Note: Khazar Lankaran won the 2010–11 Azerbaijan Cup and therefore qualified for the second qualifying round of the 2011–12 UEFA Europa League.)
3	Qarabağ	32	17	7	8	41	22	+19	58	Qualification for Europa League first qualifying round
4	AZAL	32	13	10	9	36	28	+8	49	Qualification for Europa League first qualifying round
5	Inter Baku	32	13	10	9	29	24	+5	49	
6	Baku	32	10	10	12	33	32	+1	40	

Source: Soccerway.com
Rules for classification: 1) points; 2) goal difference; 3) number of goals scored.
(C) Champions

==== Results ====
Home \ Away	AZL	BAK	INT	KHA	NEF	QAR
AZAL		1–0	1–0	1–0	1–3	3–1
Baku	2–1		0–1	0–0	0–1	0–0
Inter Baku	0–0	1–1		1–1	1–1	0–2
Khazar Lankaran	3–0	2–0	1–1		1–1	1–1
Neftçi Baku	2–1	2–0	0–0	1–1		2–0
Qarabağ	1–0	2–2	1–0	0–0	3–0	

Source: Soccerway.com
Legend: Blue = home team win; Yellow = draw; Red = away team win.

=== Relegation group ===
==== Table ====
Pos	Team	Pld	W	D	L	GF	GA	GD	Pts	Relegation
7	Gabala	32	13	12	7	31	18	+13	51	
8	Mughan	32	13	8	11	29	31	−2	47	
9	Ganja	32	8	12	12	33	37	−4	36	
10	Turan	32	7	6	19	24	47	−23	27	
11	Simurq (R)	32	4	7	21	20	52	−32	19	Relegation to Azerbaijan First Division
12	MOIK Baku (R)	32	4	6	22	14	55	−41	18	Relegation to Azerbaijan First Division

Source: Soccerway.com
Rules for classification: 1) points; 2) goal difference; 3) number of goals scored.
(R) Relegated

==== Results ====
Home \ Away	GAB	GAN	MOI	MUG	SIM	TUR
Gabala		1–1	0–0	2–1	3–0	1–0
Ganja	0–0		1–0	1–1	0–1	1–0
MOIK Baku	1–1	0–2		0–0	1–0	4–1
Mughan	1–2	2–1	1–0		3–0	2–1
Simurq	0–0	4–3	1–2	1–3		0–1
Turan	0–2	1–0	1–0	0–1	2–1	

Source: Soccerway.com
Legend: Blue = home team win; Yellow = draw; Red = away team win.

== Season statistics ==
=== Top scorers ===
As of 18 May 2011

Rank	Player	Club	Goals
1	(Georgia (country)) Georgi Adamia	Qarabağ	18
2	(Uzbekistan) Bahodir Nasimov	Neftchi Baku	15
3	(Brazil) Flavinho	Neftchi Baku	11
4	(Azerbaijan) Rauf Aliyev	Qarabağ	10
4	(Lithuania) Gvidas Juška	AZAL	10
4	(Brazil) Junivan	Gence	10
5	(Jamaica) Deon Burton	Gabala	9
5	(Azerbaijan) Sabir Allahquliyev	FK Gence	9
6	(Costa Rica) Winston Parks	Khazar	8
7	(Azerbaijan) Rashad Abdullayev	Neftchi Baku	7
7	(Brazil) Jabá	FK Baku	7

=== Hat-tricks ===
Player	For	Against	Result	Date
(Uzbekistan) Bahodir Nasimov	Neftchi Baku	Simurq	4–0	21 August 2010
(Georgia (country)) Giorgi Adamia	Qarabağ	Neftchi Baku	3–0	13 May 2011

=== Scoring ===
- First goal of the season: Bachana Tskhadadze for Simurq against Ganja (7 August 2010)
- Fastest goal of the season: 1st minute, Bahodir Nasimov for Neftchi Baku against Simurq (21 August 2010)
- Latest goal of the season: 94 minutes, George Gulordava for FK Mughan against Simurq (12 March 2011)
- Largest winning margin: 5 goals
  - MOIK Baku 0–5 Ganja (2 October 2010)
  - AZAL 5–0 Inter Baku (16 October 2010)
- Highest scoring game: 8 goals
  - Neftchi Baku 6–2 Ganja (23 October 2010)
- Most goals scored in a match by a single team: 6 goals
  - Neftchi Baku 6–2 Ganja (23 October 2010)
- Most goals scored in a match by a losing team: 3 goals
  - Simurq 4–3 Ganja (19 May 2011)

=== Clean sheets ===
- Most clean sheets: 19
  - Neftchi Baku
  - Gabala
- Fewest clean sheets: 4
  - MOIK Baku

=== Discipline ===
- Most yellow cards (club): 77
  - FK Mughan
- Most yellow cards (player): 12
  - Zurab Dzamsashvili (Ganja)
- Most red cards (club): 6
  - Baku
  - Ganja
- Most red cards (player): 2
  - Aziz Guliyev (Baku)
  - Ramal Huseynov (Ganja)

=== Monthly awards ===
Month	Player of the Month	
Month	Player	Club
September	(Uzbekistan) Bahodir Nasimov	Neftchi Baku
October	(Brazil) Flavinho	Neftchi Baku
November	(Morocco) Zouhir Benouahi	AZAL
December	(Azerbaijan) Samir Aliyev	Simurg
February	(Brazil) Flavinho	Neftchi Baku
March	(Azerbaijan) Rauf Aliyev	FK Qarabag
April	(Costa Rica) Winston Parks	Khazar
May	(Georgia (country)) Giorgi Adamia	Qarabağ
