= Ilami Halimi =

Macedonian footballer

Personal information
- Full name: Ilami Halimi; Илами Халими
- Date of birth: 8 November 1975 (age 50)
- Place of birth: Vrapčište, SFR Yugoslavia
- Height: 1.79 m (5 ft 10 1/2 in)
- Position: Midfielder

Senior career*
Years	Team	Apps	(Gls)
1998–1999	Beltinci	7	(1)
1999–2000	Čakovec	15	(2)
2000–2003	Varteks	43	(2)
2003–2004	Pobeda	18	(6)
2004	Škendija 79	14	(3)
2005–2007	Lokomotiv Plovdiv	63	(9)
2008	Olimpik Baku	5	(0)
2008–2009	Kastoria	14	(1)
2009–2011	DAC Dunajská Streda	44	(1)
Total		223	(25)

International career
2002–2005	Macedonia	4	(0)
- * Club domestic league appearances and goals

Ilami Halimi (Macedonian: Илами Халими; born 8 November 1975) is a Macedonian former footballer of Turkish ethnicity who played as a midfielder.

== Club career ==
- Potrosnik Beltinci (1998–1999)
- NK Čakovec (1999–2000)
- NK Varteks (2000–2003)
- Pobeda Prilep (2003–2004)
- Škendija 79 (2004)
- Lokomotiv Plovdiv (2004–2007)
- Olimpik Baku (2008)
- Kastoria (2008–2009)
- DAC Dunajská Streda (2009–2011)

== International career ==
He made his senior debut for Macedonia in a November 2002 friendly match against Israel in Skopje and has earned a total of 4 caps, scoring no goals. His final international was an August 2005 FIFA World Cup qualification match against Finland.
