= Pius Ikedia =

Nigerian footballer

Personal information
- Full name: Pius Nelson Ikedia
- Date of birth: 11 July 1980 (age 46)
- Place of birth: Lagos, Nigeria
- Height: 1.66 m (5 ft 5 in)
- Position: Winger

Youth career
- –1996: Okin Oloja Ventures

Senior career*
Years	Team	Apps	(Gls)
1997–1998	Bendel Insurance		
1998–1999	ASEC Mimosas		
1999–2005	Ajax	25	(2)
2002–2003	→ Groningen (loan)	27	(1)
2003–2005	→ RBC Roosendaal (loan)	39	(5)
2005–2007	AZ	12	(1)
2006–2007	→ RKC Waalwijk (loan)	24	(2)
2007–2008	Metalurh Donetsk	3	(0)
2008–2010	RBC Roosendaal	14	(0)
2010–2011	AZAL	21	(1)
2011–2012	Mağusa Türk Gücü	18	(4)
2014–2016	OFC Oostzaan		

International career
1997–2004	Nigeria	15	(1)
- * Club domestic league appearances and goals

Pius Nelson Ikedia (born 11 July 1980) is a Nigerian former professional footballer who played as a winger.

== Club career ==
A product of Abesan estate community in Ipaja area of Lagos.

While still a teenager, Ikedia scored goals along with Julius Aghahowa at Nigerian club Bendel Insurance. He played professional football for one year in Ivory Coast before he was discovered by Dutch giants Ajax. After three seasons with Ajax he was loaned out to various Dutch clubs before finally signing a permanent deal with AZ in 2005. In the 2006–07 season he was out on loan to RKC Waalwijk but failed to make an impact and was subsequently released by AZ. He returned to RBC Roosendaal, whom he had been loaned out to while at Ajax, after a trial with the Chicago Fire, after which he would go on to play for Metalurh Donetsk in Ukraine in 2007. Between 2008 and 2010, he once again played for RBC in the Netherlands. After spells in Azerbaijan and Cyprus with AZAL and Mağusa Türk Gücü, respectively, Ikedia returned to the Netherlands to play for amateur side OFC Oostzaan in 2014. He retired in 2016.

On 20 August 2016, in a match where Ikedia represented Lucky Ajax, a team of former Ajax players, against Sportclub Haarlo, he collapsed and was resuscitated on the pitch. Later, it was announced that he was recovering in the hospital and fine considering the circumstances.

== International career ==
Ikedia has played 15 international matches and scored one goal for Nigeria, for whom he debuted in 1997. He played at the 2002 FIFA World Cup and the 2000 Summer Olympics.
