= Shuvalan FK =

Shuvalan
- Full name: Şüvəlan Futbol Klubu
- Founded: 2005; 21 years ago
- Dissolved: 2019; 7 years ago
- Ground: AZAL Arena
- Capacity: 3,500
- Owner: Jahangir Asgarov
- League: Azerbaijan First Division
- 2018–19: 7th
| Home colours | Away colours |

Shuvalan FK (Azerbaijani: Şüvəlan Futbol Klubu, pronounced [ʃyvæˈlɑn]) was an Azerbaijani football club based in Şüvəlan, Baku. The club was founded in 2005 and dissolved in 2019.

The club was renamed four times in its short history, becoming Olimpik Baku, Olimpik-Shuvalan Baku, AZAL and Shuvalan. UEFA is still recognizing the club as Olimpik-Shuvalan at European competitions.

The club is also a member of the European Club Association, an organization that replaced the previous G-14 which consists of major football clubs in Europe.

== History ==
=== Early years (1996–2006) ===
The club was established in 1996 as a futsal club under the name of AMMK. It participated in national futsal league from the season 1996–97 until 2003–04. AMMK also represented Azerbaijan in UEFA Futsal Cup 2003/04 season.

AMMK became a professional football team in 2004 and joined the Azerbaijan First Division. The first Azerbaijan Premier League season was not much successful for Olimpik Baku. Croatian manager Stjepan Čordaš worked just for a couple of months and was sacked after poor results. His place was taken by Serbian Petar Kurčubić, but he was also unable to achieve good results, and Olimpik Baku finished 12th. At that time, Olimpik was called 'The club from Balkans', as there were a lot of players from Balkan countries such as Marko Mitrović, Srdjan Baljak, Rašo Babić, Saša Kovačević, Tomislav Višević and others.

=== Abdullayev years (2006–2009) ===
In June 2006, Asgar Abdullayev was appointed as the new head coach of Olimpik. He still remains as the most successful manager in the club's history. Led by Abdullayev, Olimpik improved its results, ranked 6th in 2007 and 2nd in 2008. Olimpik came very close to winning the 2007–08 league title, but the team was beaten by Qarabağ in the last round game, although they only needed to play a draw to win.

Olimpik's debut in European competitions was also not successful, as they were eliminated in the 1st qualifying round of 2008–09 UEFA Cup by Serbian side Vojvodina. Roman Akhalkatsi became the first goalscorer of Olimpik in the European club tournaments.

=== 2009–2017 ===
In 2009, the club moved from center to Shuvalan settlement and was renamed into Olimpik-Shuvalan PFC. In November 2009, Asgar Abdullayev completed his mission and he was changed by former Azerbaijani football star Nazim Suleymanov. At his debut season, Suleymanov took the team over the Azerbaijan Cup quarter-final for a first time in its history. The club once again was renamed in 2010, this time to AZAL PFC due to sponsorship reasons from airline company Azerbaijan Airlines. In September 2010, the club management announced the construction of new AZAL Arena in Shuvalan.

The 2010–11 Azerbaijan Premier League season was a great for AZAL. The team finished 4th and entered UEFA Europa League 2011-12 season. Although the club was renamed into AZAL in 2010, it represented as Olimpik-Shuvalan in UEFA Europa League competitions due to UEFA's sponsorship regulations. Before the home game against Minsk, Suleymanov said that he would resign in case of defeat. AZAL lost to Minsk 2–3 in aggregate, and Suleymanov announced his resignation after second match in Minsk.

In July, club president Vaqif Gasymov invited Elkhan Abdullayev to AZAL and he signed a one-year contract. He started with a brilliance victory over Simurq (3:0), but resigned after 11 games, when AZAL came down to 11th position. The club sponsors made a decision to replace him by Rafig Mirzayev, Abdullayev's former assistant. Mirzayev started as a caretaker, winning 3 games consecutively and taking the team up to 7th place. In December 2011, Mirzayev signed a half-year contract with AZAL. In April, after the unsuccessful run, Mirzayev was sacked, and Azerbaijan national football team former manager Vagif Sadygov was appointed as a new head coach.

It was an ambiguous season for AZAL and its manager. The team won 16 games, scored 57 goals, renewing own records, but for the second time consecutively did not enter Championship Group after Preliminary Round. The management recognized the season as unsuccessful despite the fact that the team has won 9 of the 10 matches in the relegation group. Brazilian striker Nildo scored 21 goals, showing the best individual record in AZAL's history for the scorers in a single season and became one of the topscorers of the 2012–13 Azerbaijan Premier League.

The summer of 2013, saw more budget cuts and several big names as Nildo, Zouhir Benouahi, Nduka Usim, etc. leaving the club, but this time the main concern for fans was the very future of the club.

=== Recent years (2017–) ===
On 12 May 2017, the club was renamed into Shuvalan FK.

The club dissolved in 2019.

=== Domestic league and cup history ===
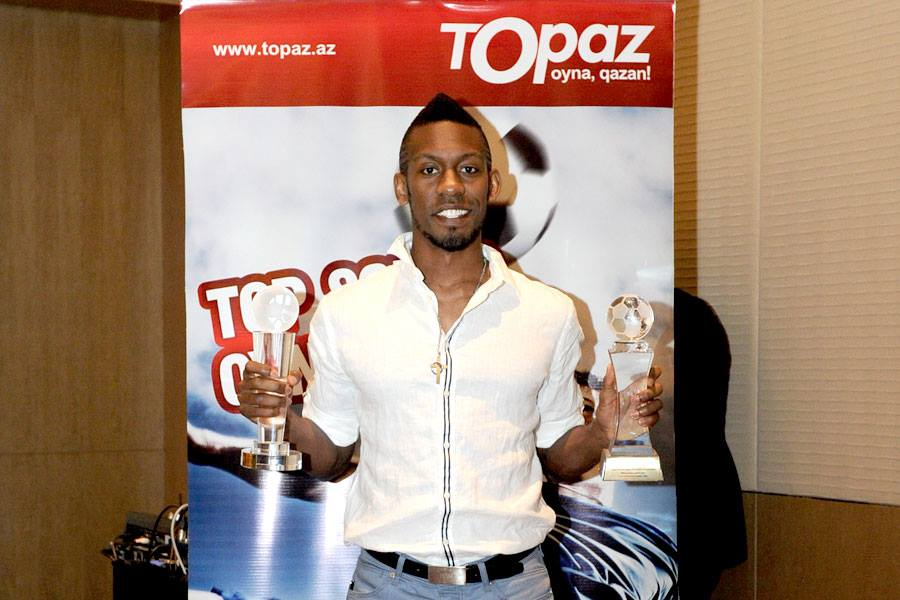
John Oluremi was Shuvalan's top goalscorer during the 2013–14 season.

| Season | Div. | Pos. | Pl. | W | D | L | GS | GA | P | Domestic Cup | Top scorer | Goals | Manager |
|---|---|---|---|---|---|---|---|---|---|---|---|---|---|
| 2004–05 | 2nd | 1 | 14 | 10 | 3 | 1 | 25 | 9 | 33 | 1/16 Finals | | | (Azerbaijan) Garibov |
| 2005–06 | 1st | 12 | 26 | 5 | 8 | 13 | 15 | 27 | 23 | 1/8 Finals | (Serbia) Baljak | 3 | (Croatia) Čordaš / (Serbia) Kurčubić |
| 2006–07 | 1st | 6 | 24 | 11 | 8 | 5 | 28 | 17 | 41 | 1/8 Finals | (Azerbaijan) Mammadov | 13 | (Azerbaijan) A.Abdullayev |
| 2007–08 | 1st | 2 | 26 | 17 | 7 | 2 | 29 | 7 | 58 | Quarterfinals | (Brazil) Junivan | 11 | (Azerbaijan) A.Abdullayev |
| 2008–09 | 1st | 6 | 26 | 12 | 8 | 6 | 32 | 18 | 44 | Quarterfinals | (Azerbaijan) Gomes | 10 | (Azerbaijan) A.Abdullayev |
| 2009–10 | 1st | 7 | 42 | 16 | 13 | 13 | 47 | 29 | 61 | Semi-finals | (Moldova) Doroş | 12 | (Azerbaijan) A.Abdullayev / (Azerbaijan) Suleymanov |
| 2010–11 | 1st | 4 | 32 | 13 | 10 | 9 | 36 | 28 | 49 | Semi-finals | (Lithuania) Juška | 10 | (Azerbaijan) Suleymanov |
| 2011–12 | 1st | 7 | 32 | 12 | 8 | 12 | 44 | 44 | 44 | Quarterfinals | (Morocco) Benouahi | 10 | (Azerbaijan) E.Abdullayev / (Azerbaijan) Mirzayev / (Azerbaijan) Sadygov |
| 2012–13 | 1st | 7 | 32 | 16 | 9 | 7 | 57 | 32 | 57 | 1/8 Finals | (Brazil) Nildo | 21 | (Azerbaijan) Sadygov |
| 2013–14 | 1st | 8 | 36 | 6 | 13 | 17 | 29 | 49 | 31 | Second Round | (United States) Oluremi | 8 | (Azerbaijan) Sadygov / (Azerbaijan) Ahmadov |
| 2014–15 | 1st | 6 | 32 | 10 | 9 | 13 | 37 | 42 | 39 | Quarter Final | (Democratic Republic of the Congo) Mombongo-Dues | 13 | (Azerbaijan) Ahmadov |
| 2015–16 | 1st | 7 | 36 | 13 | 7 | 16 | 26 | 38 | 46 | Second round | (Georgia (country)) Kvirtia | 7 | (Azerbaijan) Ahmadov |
| 2016–17 | 1st | 8 | 28 | 1 | 7 | 20 | 13 | 50 | 10 | Quarterfinal | (Georgia (country)) Kvirtia (Georgia (country)) Janelidze | 3 | (Azerbaijan) Ahmadov |
| 2017–18 | 2nd | 3 | 27 | 13 | 6 | 8 | 30 | 20 | 45 | 1/8 finals | (Georgia (country)) Kvirtia | 8 | (Azerbaijan) Nabiyev |

=== European history ===
Updated 10 February 2013.

| Season | Competition | Round | Country | Club | Home | Away | Aggregate |
|---|---|---|---|---|---|---|---|
| 2008–09 | UEFA Cup | Q1 | (Serbia) | Vojvodina | 1–1 | 0–1 | 1–2 |
| 2011–12 | UEFA Europa League | Q1 | (Belarus) | Minsk | 1–1 | 1–2 | 2–3 |

- Q = Qualifying

== Stadium ==
AZAL Arena is a football stadium in Shuvalan settlement of Baku, Azerbaijan. It is currently used as club's home stadium and holds 3,500 people. The club plans to construct another tribune by increasing stadiums' capacity to 6000 in the upcoming years.

During 2005–2011 years Shuvalan played its home games at Shafa Stadium.

== Crest and colours ==
1996–04

2005–09

2009–10

Shuvalan changed the crest five times during its short history. Between 1996 and 2004 years the crest was the same of AMMK's organisation logo. In 2005, as soon as AMMK was renamed into Olimpik Baku the logo was also modified. New logo was the form of circular blue shield with the Olympic flame in the middle.

In 2009, it was designed a new version of the crest with a white and blue stripes, and remained for a next season, however the club became AZAL PFK. Last logo seems like the older logo, but in the center of traditional blue circular shield is drawn an airliner

In 2017, AZAL was renamed into Shuvalan the logo was also modified.

=== Shirt sponsors and kit manufacturers ===
Since its foundation Shuvalan's traditional home kit is completely blue. For the guest games the team usually wears an all white kit, except 2007–08 season, when Shuvalan has worn red-black striped jersey, black shorts and red socks. For the last three years the club's kits are manufactured by Umbro and sponsored by Silk Way Airlines. Shuvalan's new kit manufacturer is Joma.

| Years | Manufacturer | Sponsor |
|---|---|---|
| 2008–2009 | (England) Umbro | (Azerbaijan) Silk Way Airlines |
| 2009–2010 | (Germany) Adidas | (Azerbaijan) Silk Way Airlines |
| 2010–2016 | (England) Umbro | (Azerbaijan) Silk Way Airlines |
| 2016–present | (Spain) Joma | (Azerbaijan) Silk Way Airlines |

== Players ==
- Rashad Abdullayev
- Murad Agayev
- Tarlan Ahmadov
- Aílton José Pereira Júnior
- Daniel Akhtyamov
- Elvin Aliyev
- Ghani Animofoshe
- Rašo Babić
- Srđan Baljak
- Pathé Bangoura

- Samuel Barlay
- Gennadi Bliznyuk
- Ervin Bulku
- Mirko Bunjevčević
- Brian Fok
- John Córdoba
- Arif Dashdemirov
- Eduardo da Conceição Maciel
- Roman Goginashvili
- Aleksandre Gogoberishvili

- Leandro Melino Gomes
- Eshgin Guliyev
- Royal Najafov
- Ramin Guliyev
- Ender Günlü
- Ilgar Gurbanov
- Sanan Gurbanov
- Aleksandre Guruli
- Rail Malikov
- Nodar Mammadov

- Samir Masimov
- Rauf Mehdiyev
- Marko Mitrović
- Bechir Mogaadi
- Freddy Mombongo-Dues
- Yuri Muzika
- Agil Mammadov
- Nugzar Kvirtiya
- Valeriy Kutsenko
- Ritus Krjauklis

- Enyo Krastovchev
- Nikolajs Kozačuks
- Domagoj Kosić
- Oskars Kļava
- Lasha Kasradze
- Tamkin Khalilzade
- Yasyn Khamid
- Akhtam Khamrakulov
- Mikheil Khutsishvili
- Serghei Lașcencov

- Nizami Hajiyev
- Ilami Halimi
- Arkadi Halperin
- Victor Igbekoyi
- Pius Ikedia
- Arif İsayev
- Emin Jafarguliyev
- Mensur Limani
- Agil Nabiyev
- Adil Naghiyev
- Shahriyar Rahimov

== Records ==
=== Club ===
- Best position in Azerbaijan Premier League: **2nd** (2007–08 season)
- Worst position in Azerbaijan Premier League: **12th**(2005–06 season)
- First competitive match in Azerbaijan competition: v. Adliyya Baku, Azerbaijan First Division 2004–05 season, 9 October 2004 (draw 0–0).
- First competitive match in European competition: v. FK Vojvodina, UEFA Cup 2008–09 season, 17 July 2008 (lost 0–1).

=== Individual ===
Lists of the players with the most caps and top goalscorers for Shuvalan.(players in bold signifies current Shuvalan player):

==== Top goalscorers ====
As of Match played 13 February 2016

| | Name | Years | League | Azerbaijan Cup | CBC Sport Cup | Europe | Total |
|---|---|---|---|---|---|---|---|
| 1 | (Georgia (country)) **Nugzar Kvirtia** | 2009–2012, 2015-2018 | 24 (171) | 2 (15) | 1 (3) | 0 (2) | **26** (191) |
| 2 | (Morocco) Zouhir Benouahi | 2010–2013 | 24 (76) | 1 (7) | 0 (0) | 0 (2) | **25** (85) |
| 3 | (Nigeria) Victor Igbekoyi | 2009–2015 | 23 (156) | 0 (15) | 0 (0) | 1 (2) | **24** (173) |
| 4 | (Brazil) Nlido | 2012–2013 | 21 (32) | 0 (1) | 0 (0) | 0 (0) | **21** (33) |
| 5 | (Brazil) Junivan | 2007–2009, 2010 | 17 (55) | 0 (?) | 0 (0) | 0 (0) | **17** (?) |
| 6 | (Democratic Republic of the Congo) Freddy Mombongo-Dues | 2014–2015 | 13 (28) | 1 (3) | 0 (0) | 0 (0) | **14** (31) |
| 7 | (Azerbaijan) Khagani Mammadov | 2006–2007 | 13 (23) | 1 (?) | 0 (0) | 0 (0) | **14** (?) |
| 7 | (Moldova) Anatolie Doroș | 2008–2009 | 12 (28) | 2 (?) | 0 (0) | 0 (0) | **14** (?) |
| 8 | (United States) Jon Oluremi | 2012–2014 | 12 (41) | 0 (1) | 0 (0) | 0 (0) | **12** (42) |
| 9 | (Lithuania) Gvidas Juška | 2010–2011 | 10 (31) | 1 (4) | 0 (0) | 0 (0) | **11** (35) |

==== Most appearances ====
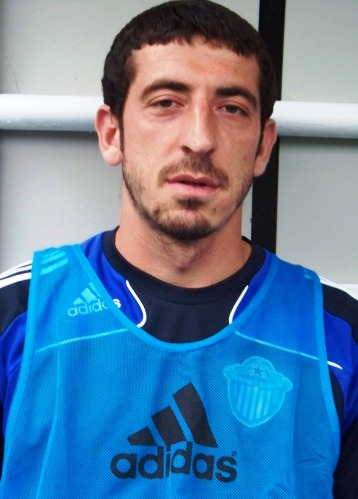
Agil Nabiyev appeared over 129 times during his six-year stint at Shuvalan.

As of Match played 13 February 2016

| | Name | Years | League | Azerbaijan Cup | CBC Sport Cup | Europe | Total |
|---|---|---|---|---|---|---|---|
| 1 | (Azerbaijan) Nduka Usim | 2004–2013 | 208 (5) | ? (0) | 0 (0) | 4 (0) | **212+** (5) |
| 2 | (Georgia (country)) **Nugzar Kvirtia** | 2009–2012, 2015-2018 | 171 (24) | 15 (2) | 1 (3) | 2 (0) | **191** (26) |
| 3 | (Nigeria) Victor Igbekoyi | 2009–2015 | 156 (23) | 15 (0) | 0 (0) | 2 (1) | **173** (24) |
| 4 | (Azerbaijan) Agil Nabiyev | 2006–2012 | 125 (0) | ? (1) | 0 (0) | 4 (0) | **129+** (1) |
| 5 | (Serbia) Dragan Mandic | 2007–2011 | 107 (1) | ? (0) | 0 (0) | 0 (0) | **107+** (1) |
| 6 | (Azerbaijan) Jahangir Hasanzade | 2009–2014 | 89 (0) | 9 (0) | 0 (0) | 2 (0) | **100** (0) |
| 7 | (Serbia) Branislav Arsenijević | 2011–2014 | 88 (6) | 5 (0) | 0 (0) | 0 (0) | **93** (6) |
| 8 | (Latvia) Oskars Kļava | 2012–2015 | 86 (3) | 5 (0) | 0 (0) | 0 (0) | **91** (3) |
| 9 | (Morocco) Zouhir Benouahi | 2010–2013 | 75 (24) | 7 (1) | 0 (0) | 2 (0) | **85** (25) |
| 10 | (Azerbaijan) Tarlan Ahmadov | 2006–2009 | 72 (1) | ? (0) | 0 (0) | 2 (0) | **74+** (1) |

== Notable managers ==
Information correct as of match played 28 April 2017. Only competitive matches are counted.

| Name | Nat. | From | To | P | W | D | L | GS | GA | %W | Honours | Notes |
|---|---|---|---|---|---|---|---|---|---|---|---|---|
| Shakir Garibov | Azerbaijan | June 2004 | May 2005 | 16 | 10 | 3 | 3 | 0 | 0 | 62.50 | | |
| Stjepan Čordaš | Croatia | June 2005 | Aug 2005 | 4 | 1 | 1 | 2 | 0 | 0 | 25.00 | | |
| Jamaladdin Aliyev (Interim) | Azerbaijan | June 2004 | May 2005 | 1 | 0 | 1 | 0 | 0 | 0 | 0.00 | | |
| Petar Kurčubić | Serbia | Aug 2005 | May 2006 | 26 | 7 | 7 | 12 | 0 | 0 | 26.92 | | |
| Asgar Abdullayev | Azerbaijan | June 2006 | Nov 2009 | 105 | 52 | 30 | 23 | 0 | 0 | 49.52 | | |
| Nazim Suleymanov | Azerbaijan | 23 Nov 2009 | 7 July 2011 | 64 | 24 | 22 | 18 | 0 | 0 | 37.50 | | |
| Elkhan Abdullayev (Interim) | Azerbaijan | June 2011 | Oct 2011 | 11 | 2 | 4 | 5 | 0 | 0 | 18.18 | | |
| Rafig Mirzayev | Azerbaijan | Nov 2011 | April 2012 | 18 | 9 | 1 | 8 | 0 | 0 | 50.00 | | |
| Vagif Sadygov | Azerbaijan | 6 April 2012 | 15 March 2014 | 63 | 23 | 19 | 21 | 0 | 0 | 36.51 | | |
| Shakir Garibov | Azerbaijan | 16 March 2014 | 17 March 2014 | 1 | 0 | 0 | 1 | 0 | 0 | 0.00 | | |
| Tarlan Ahmadov | Azerbaijan | 18 March 2014 | 3 May 2017 | 113 | 26 | 29 | 58 | 88 | 148 | 23.01 | | |
| Agil Nabiyev | Azerbaijan | 10 June 2017 | | | | | | | | | | |

- Notes:

P – Total of played matches W – Won matches D – Drawn matches L – Lost matches GS – Goal scored GA – Goals against
%W – Percentage of matches won

Nationality is indicated by the corresponding FIFA country code(s).

=== Presidential history ===
Shuvalan was founded by former futsal player, currently FIFA licensed Football agent Kamil Mammadov. In 2005, he sold the club to Silk Way Airlines. Since the Shuvalan FK has had just two presidents: former general officer Rasul Rasulov and the club's former vice-president Vaqif Gasymov. At the end of 2011, after Gasymov's resign Silk Way Airlines company chairman Zaur Akhundov became the Shuvalan FK new president.

| Name | Years |
|---|---|
| Kamil Mammadov | 1996–2006 |
| Rasul Rasulov | 2006–2009 |
| Vaqif Gasymov | 2009–2012 |
| Zaur Akhundov | 2012–2017 |
