= Ghani Animofoshe =

Nigerien footballer

Personal information
- Full name: Ayotunde Ganiyu Anifowoshe
- Date of birth: February 3, 1985 (age 41)
- Place of birth: Niamey, Niger
- Height: 1.74 m (5 ft 9 in)
- Position: Striker

Team information
- Current team: Kwara United F.C.
- Number: 23

Senior career*
Years	Team	Apps	(Gls)
2000–2001	Sunshine Stars		
2002–2004	Kandadji Sport		
2004–2006	Göyazan Qazax	49	(8)
2006–2007	Olimpik Baku	2	(0)
2009	JS du Ténéré		
2010	Sunshine Stars	?	(4)
2011–	Kwara United		
- * Club domestic league appearances and goals

Ayotunde Ganiyu Anifowoshe (born 3 February 1985 in Niamey) is a Nigerien footballer who plays for Kwara United F.C.

== Career ==
Anifowoshe played for Göyazan Qazax during the 2004–05 and 2005–06 Azerbaijan season's and for Olimpik Baku during the 2006–07 season.

== Career statistics ==
Club performance			League		Cup		Continental		Total	
Season	Club	League	Apps	Goals	Apps	Goals	Apps	Goals	Apps	Goals
2004–06	Göyazan Qazax	Azerbaijan Premier League	26	5			-		26	5
2005–06	Göyazan Qazax	Azerbaijan Premier League	23	3		1	-		23	4
2006–07	Olimpik Baku	Azerbaijan Premier League	2	0			-		2	0
Total	Azerbaijan		51	8		1	-		51	9
Career total			51	8		1	-		51	9
