= Kremenchuk flight college of National Aviation University =

Aviation school in Ukraine

Coordinates: 49.0664°N 33.4015°E

Kremenchuk flight college of Kharkiv National University of Internal Affairs
- Кременчуцький льотний коледж Харківського національного Університету внутрішніх справ
- Motto: Volare ubicumque est caelum
- Established: 1 July 1960
- Rector: Volodymyr Vasylyovych Holovenskiy
- Students: 1,049
- Location: Kremenchuk, Ukraine
- Website: www.flightcollege.com.ua

The Kremenchuk flight college of Kharkiv National University of Internal Affairs (KFC KNUIA; Ukrainian: Кременчуцький льотний коледж Харківського національного університету внутрішніх справ; КЛК ХНУВС) is a college in Ukraine specialising in the teaching of aerospace-related courses.

== History ==
=== Soviet era ===
The foundations of flight training in Kremenchuk lay in the postwar period. In 1952, the Tenth Military Aviation School for ab initio training of pilots of the Air Force was established by a decision of the Kiev military district command. Some time later, in 1956, the school was reorganized as a specialized flight school, because of the great need for civil aviation pilots during the changeover of the country to a peacetime footing. On 1 July 1960 it was decided to create Kremenchug Aviation flight school by the command of the Air Force Chief at the Council of USSR Ministers Colonel General E.T. Loginov. Kremenchuk was chosen as an aviation personnel training center because during the first postwar Five-Year Plan it had become an important industrial city with a developed road, rail and river traffic infrastructure. The geographical location of the city on the Dnieper River was also considered an important factor in this choice. The Kremenchug region is mainly flat, cut through with the woods and rivers, which made it ideal for flying training. Weather conditions were also favorable: a lot of sunny days, with mild winters. Prevailing south-eastern winds made flights possible throughout the year and in all weather conditions.

=== Post-Ukraine independence ===
After the breakup of the Soviet Union the school was renamed Kremenchug Flight College in 1993. Since 2003 the college has been part of the National Aviation University along with Sloviansk college, Kryvyi Rih college, Zhytomyr military institute and other campuses.

In its more than 50-year history KFC NAU has trained more than 60,000 professionals from Ukraine and CIS countries; and approximately 7,000 aviation specialists from 73 other countries (including Australia, Bulgaria, Spain, Iran, India, Canada, China, Congo, Cuba, Laos, Libya, Mexico, Germany, Nepal, Poland, USA and Ecuador). Training and retraining of foreign specialists was and remains one of the priorities of Kremenchug Flight College NAU.

KFC NAU has specialised in the field of training and retraining of helicopter personnel. Fixed-wing aircraft used include the Yakovlev Yak-18T and Antonov An-2; training helicopters used over the years include the Aerocopter AK-1-3, Kamov Ka-15, Kamov Ka-26, Mil Mi-1, Mil Mi-2, Mil Mi-4, Mil Mi-8 and Mil Mi-26.

== Campuses and buildings ==
The infrastructure of the school includes two buildings. They consist of 79 lecture halls, studies and laboratories with total area of 9,544 m^{2} (102,731 ft^{2}). Studies and laboratories are used for academic training. In addition to several laboratories for teaching science and technical subjects, there are procedures trainers for the Mi-2, Mi-8 and Mi-8MTV. Vocational subjects are taught in single-purpose studies, equipped with proper training aids. The college library total area is 392 m^{2} (4,219 ft^{2}) with over 100,000 books. A library reading hall can accommodate up to 80 people.

The Campus also includes cadets’ dormitories of 6,999 m^{2} (75,337 ft^{2}) that can accommodate up to 500 students; a 300-seat canteen (one of several dining facilities accommodating a total of 626 persons); a sports complex; and a training airfield with ancillary facilities.

== Departments and faculties ==
The academic training department of the college consists of 7 departments:

- Aeronautical and technical subjects
- Economy
- Distance training
- Foreign students and conversion training
- Training process managing and monitoring
- Practical training and employment
- Methodical assistance
- Library

12 faculties provide training:

- Airframe flight line maintenance faculty
- Airframe and engines design faculty
- Avionics faculty
- Technical subjects faculty
- Fuel and oils faculty
- Accountancy and audit faculty
- Transport companies management faculty
- General economics faculty
- Nature science, mathematics and information technologies faculty
- Social and humanitarian faculty
- Ukrainian and English language faculty
- Physical training faculty

== Notable alumni ==
Among the tens of thousands pilot graduates are several recipients of the title Hero of the Soviet Union, including:

- Alexei Leonov, cosmonaut; the first person to conduct an extra-vehicular activity (EVA), also known as a space walk
- Anatoli Levchenko, cosmonaut; selected to be the back-up commander of the first Buran space shuttle flight

== Awards and reputation ==
On 4 January 1983, the College was awarded the Order of Friendship of Peoples by the Presidium of the Supreme Soviet of the USSR, for its "great contribution in training highly skilled aviation personnel for civil aviation of the USSR and other countries and mastering new aircraft types".
