= Asgar Abdullayev (footballer) =

Azerbaijani footballer and manager (born 1960)

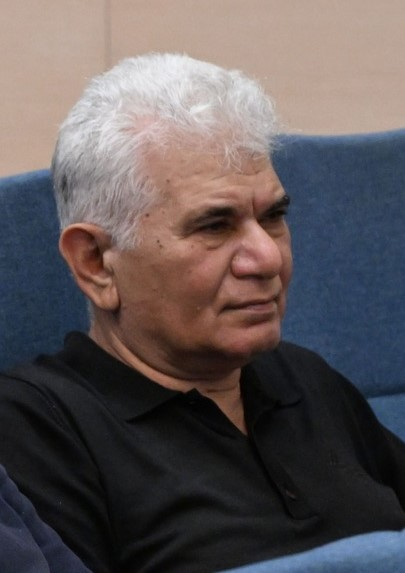

Personal information
- Full name: Asgar Mammad oglu Abullayev
- Date of birth: 27 March 1963 (age 63)
- Place of birth: Baku, Azerbaijan SSR, Soviet Union
- Height: 1.70 m (5 ft 7 in)
- Position: Defender

Senior career*
Years	Team	Apps	(Gls)
1979–1991	Neftchi Baku	319	(1)

Managerial career
- 1998–2001: Shafa Baku FK
- 2000–2002: Azerbaijan U-21
- 2000–2003: Azerbaijan, assistant
- 2003–2004: Azerbaijan
- 2004–2005: Azerbaijan, assistant
- 2005–2006: Baku
- 2006–2009: AZAL
- 2011–2012: Turan Tovuz
- 2013–2014: Araz
- 2015–2016: Neftchi Baku
- 2016–2018: Turan Tovuz
- * Club domestic league appearances and goals as of 8 July 2008 ‡ National team caps and goals as of 8 July 2008

Asgar Mammad oglu Abdullayev (born 27 March 1960) is an Azerbaijani retired footballer. He is currently manager of Turan Tovuz. He played for Neftchi Baku as a defender for a long time, making 319 appearances and scoring 1 goal.

Abdullayev began his managerial career at Shafa Baku FK. He has also managed the Azerbaijan U-21 and Azerbaijan national football team, FC Baku, Shuvalan FK. He is currently manager of Araz in Azerbaijan Premier League.

== Managerial career statistics ==
Club	Managerial Tenure	P	W	D	L	Win %
(Azerbaijan) Shafa Baku FK	1998 - 2001					
Azerbaijan	2002–2003	9	1	2	6	11.11
(Azerbaijan) Baku	2004 - 2006					
(Azerbaijan) AZAL	June 2006 – November 2009	105	52	30	23	49.52
(Azerbaijan) Turan Tovuz	6 May 2011 – 12 October 2013	41	8	8	25	19.51
