= Vagif Sadygov =

Azerbaijani footballer and manager (born 1959)

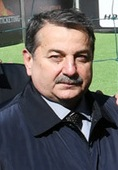
- Sadygov in 2019

Personal information
- Full name: Vaqif Ağa-Əli oğlu Sadıqov
- Date of birth: 1 April 1959 (age 67)
- Place of birth: Baku, Azerbaijan SSR, USSR
- Position: Midfielder

Senior career*
Years	Team	Apps	(Gls)
1977—1979	Araz Nakhchivan		
1980—1987	Neftchi Baku	92	(2)
1988	Nistru Chişinău	3	(0)
1988	Goyazan Qazakh	10	(0)
1988	Khazar Sumgayit	6	(0)
1989	Neftchi Baku	23	(0)
1989—1992	Khazar Sumgayit	107	(46)
1993	Nijat Mashtaga	2	(2)

Managerial career
- 1993: Nijat Mashtaga
- 1993—1995: Neftchi Baku
- 1994—1995: Azerbaijan U21
- 1995—1997: Farid Baku
- 1997—1998: Azerbaijan
- 1999: Anzhi Makhachkala, (assistant)
- 2000—2001: ANS-Pivani Baku
- 2001—2002: Shafa Baku
- 2002: Azerbaijan
- 2003: Machine Sazi
- 2004—2005: Azerbaijan U21
- 2005: Azerbaijan
- 2005—2008: Ganjlarbirliyi Sumgayit, (vice-president)
- 2009: Azerbaijan, (assistant)
- 2009—2010: Neftchi Baku
- 2011: Anzhi Makhachkala, (assistant)
- 2012—2014: AZAL PFC
- * Club domestic league appearances and goals

Vagif Sadygov (born 1 April 1959, Azerbaijani: Vaqif Sadıqov) is an Azerbaijani football manager.

== Life and career ==
Sadygov started playing football as a midfielder for Araz Nakhichevan. His club career included spells with Neftchi Baku, Khazar Sumgayit and FC Nistru Otaci. After his playing career ended, he moved into management, first with Neftchi Baku in 1993, then with ANS Pivani Baki. He also managed Shafa Baku, Azerbaijan national under-21 football team in 1996, which then led him to manage Azerbaijan national football team in 1997. After unsuccessful results, he was dismissed in 1998, but returned in 2005 to replace the Brazilian Carlos Alberto Torres. He also managed Shafa Baku, Genclerbirliyi Sumgayit, Azerbaijan national under-21 football team.

== Achievements ==
- Azerbaijan Cup
  - Winner: 2 (1995, 2001)
- Azerbaijan Supercup
  - Winner: 1 (1995)
- Azerbaijan First Division
  - Winner: 1 (1996)
