= 2009–10 Azerbaijan Premier League =

Azerbaijan Premier League
- Season: 2009–10
- Champions: Inter Baku
- Relegated: Standard Baku; FK Karvan
- Champions League: Inter Baku
- Europa League: FK Baku; FK Qarabağ; Khazar Lankaran (via domestic cup)
- Matches: 172
- Goals: 392 (2.28 per match)
- Top goalscorer: Farid Guliyev (16)
- Biggest home win: Standard 6–0 Karvan
- Biggest away win: Mughan 1–6 Inter
- Highest scoring: Mughan 1–6 Inter; Standard 3–4 Baku

The 2009–10 Azerbaijan Premier League was the eighteenth season of top-tier football in Azerbaijan. It began on 14 August 2009 and finished in May 2010. FK Baku were the defending champions.

The league was competed in two stages. The first stage consisted of a regular home-and-away round-robin schedule for a total of 22 matches per team. The competition then split into two halves. However, each team took over to the respective group only records earned against the remaining 5 teams in their second round group. The teams ranked first through sixth played out the championship and the European spots while the bottom six teams had to avoid one of the two relegation places.

== Teams ==
MOIK Baku and Bakili Baku were relegated after finishing the 2008–09 season in the bottom two places. Since the Association of Football Federations of Azerbaijan did not grant a Premier League license to any of the teams in the Azerbaijan First Division, the league size was reduced to twelve teams.

=== Stadia and locations ===
Location of teams in Azerbaijan Premier League 2009–10

| Team | Location | Venue | Capacity |
|---|---|---|---|
| FK Baku | Baku | Tofig Bakhramov Stadium | 29,858 |
| Inter | Baku | Shafa Stadium | 7,840 |
| Karvan | Yevlakh | Yevlakh Stadium | 8,500 |
| Khazar | Lankaran | Lankaran City Stadium | 17,500 |
| Mughan | Salyan | Salyany Olympic Stadium | 4,000 |
| Neftchi | Baku | Ismet Gaibov Stadium | 7,000 |
| Olimpik-Shuvalan | Baku | Shafa Stadium | 7,840 |
| Qarabağ | Aghdam | Guzanli Olympic Stadium | 15,000 |
| Qäbälä PFC | Qäbälä | Gabala City Stadium | 2,000 |
| Simurq | Zaqatala | Zaqatala City Stadium | 3,500 |
| Standard | Sumgayit | Mehdi Huseynzade Stadium | 26,000 |
| Turan | Tovuz | Tovuz City Stadium | 10,000 |

=== Personnel and sponsoring ===
| Team | Head coach | Team captain | Kitmaker | Shirt sponsor |
|---|---|---|---|---|
| FK Baku | Cüneyt Biçer | Jamshid Maharramov | Erreà | |
| Inter | Kakhaber Tskhadadze | Samir Abbasov | Adidas | IBA |
| Karvan | Yunis Huseynov | Ismayil Mammadov | Adidas | Azneftemash |
| Khazar | Agaselim Mirjavadov | Kamran Agaev | Puma | PalSüd |
| Mughan | Almir Hurtic | Elnur Mammadov | Olympikus | Nissan |
| Neftchi | Arif Asadov | Rail Malikov | Adidas | SOCAR |
| Olimpik-Shuvalan | Nazim Suleymanov | Agil Nabiyev | Adidas | Silk Way |
| Qarabağ | Gurban Gurbanov | Aslan Kerimov | Adidas | Azersun Holding |
| Qäbälä PFC | Tony Adams | Kanan Karimov | Adidas | |
| Simurq | Roman Pokora | Alexandr Malygin | Adidas | |
| Standard | Boyukagha Hajiyev | Agil Mammadov | Kappa | Bank Standard |
| Turan | Nizami Sadygov | Nadir Nabiyev | Adidas | |

=== Managerial changes ===
| Team | Outgoing manager | Manner of departure | Date of vacancy | Replaced by | Date of appointment |
|---|---|---|---|---|---|
| Inter Baku | Valentin Khodukin | Resigned | 10 June 2009 | Kakhaber Tskhadadze | 10 June 2009 |
| Khazar Lankaran | Igor Ponomaryov | Resigned | 11 June 2009 | Agaselim Mirjavadov | 16 June 2009 |
| Neftchi Baku | Boyukaga Aghayev | Mutual consent | 16 September 2009 | Vagif Sadygov | 29 September 2009 |
| FK Baku | Gjoko Hadžievski | Resigned | 24 September 2009 | Bülent Korkmaz | 25 September 2009 |
| FK Standard Sumgayit | Valdas Ivanauskas | Sacked | 21 October 2009 | Boyukagha Hajiyev | 23 October 2009 |
| Olimpik-Shuvalan | Asgar Abdullayev | Resigned | 23 November 2009 | Nazim Suleymanov | 23 November 2009 |
| FK Mughan | Kemal Alispahić | Sacked | 1 December 2009 | Almir Hurtić | 1 December 2009 |
| Neftchi Baku | Vagif Sadygov | Sacked | 21 February 2010 | Arif Asadov | 25 February 2010 |
| FK Baku | Bülent Korkmaz | Resigned | 22 March 2010 | Cüneyt Biçer | 3 April 2010 |

== First round ==
=== League table ===
| Pos | Team | Pld | W | D | L | GF | GA | GD | Pts | Qualification |
|---|---|---|---|---|---|---|---|---|---|---|
| 1 | Inter Baku | 22 | 15 | 4 | 3 | 36 | 18 | +18 | 49 | Qualification for championship group |
| 2 | Khazar Lankaran | 22 | 12 | 8 | 2 | 29 | 11 | +18 | 44 | Qualification for championship group |
| 3 | Qarabağ | 22 | 11 | 9 | 2 | 21 | 12 | +9 | 42 | Qualification for championship group |
| 4 | Baku | 22 | 10 | 7 | 5 | 22 | 17 | +5 | 37 | Qualification for championship group |
| 5 | Gabala | 22 | 10 | 6 | 6 | 24 | 21 | +3 | 36 | Qualification for championship group |
| 6 | Neftçi Baku | 22 | 9 | 8 | 5 | 20 | 14 | +6 | 35 | Qualification for championship group |
| 7 | Simurq | 22 | 9 | 7 | 6 | 26 | 21 | +5 | 34 | Qualification for relegation group |
| 8 | Olimpik-Shuvalan | 22 | 6 | 7 | 9 | 20 | 23 | −3 | 25 | Qualification for relegation group |
| 9 | Turan | 22 | 4 | 5 | 13 | 23 | 32 | −9 | 17 | Qualification for relegation group |
| 10 | Mughan | 22 | 3 | 7 | 12 | 12 | 27 | −15 | 16 | Qualification for relegation group |
| 11 | Standard | 22 | 2 | 5 | 15 | 16 | 34 | −18 | 11 | Qualification for relegation group |
| 12 | Karvan | 22 | 2 | 5 | 15 | 17 | 36 | −19 | 11 | Qualification for relegation group |

Source: Soccerway.com
Rules for classification: 1) points; 2) goal difference; 3) number of goals scored.

=== Results ===
| Home \ Away | BAK | INT | KAR | KHA | MUG | NEF | OLS | QAR | GAB | SIM | STA | TUR |
|---|---|---|---|---|---|---|---|---|---|---|---|---|
| Baku | | 2–0 | 1–0 | 0–3 | 0–0 | 0–2 | 0–0 | 0–1 | 2–0 | 1–2 | 0–0 | 2–1 |
| Inter Baku | 1–0 | | 1–0 | 1–1 | 1–0 | 1–0 | 2–2 | 2–1 | 3–2 | 2–1 | 4–2 | 3–1 |
| Karvan | 1–1 | 0–2 | | 0–2 | 1–1 | 0–1 | 1–3 | 1–1 | 4–1 | 3–2 | 2–2 | 0–0 |
| Khazar Lankaran | 1–1 | 1–0 | 3–0 | | 2–0 | 0–0 | 2–1 | 0–0 | 1–0 | 3–0 | 0–0 | 1–1 |
| Mughan | 0–1 | 1–6 | 1–0 | 1–2 | | 2–2 | 0–1 | 0–1 | 0–0 | 0–0 | 1–0 | 2–3 |
| Neftçi Baku | 1–1 | 2–1 | 1–0 | 0–0 | 0–2 | | 0–0 | 0–0 | 1–1 | 0–1 | 2–0 | 2–0 |
| Olimpik-Shuvalan | 0–1 | 0–1 | 4–0 | 1–0 | 0–0 | 0–1 | | 1–1 | 0–2 | 0–3 | 2–0 | 3–3 |
| Qarabağ | 0–0 | 1–1 | 3–2 | 1–0 | 2–1 | 1–0 | 1–0 | | 0–0 | 0–0 | 1–0 | 2–1 |
| Gabala | 0–2 | 0–1 | 1–0 | 1–1 | 3–0 | 1–0 | 2–1 | 1–1 | | 2–1 | 2–1 | 1–0 |
| Simurq | 1–2 | 1–1 | 2–0 | 1–2 | 0–0 | 0–0 | 2–0 | 1–0 | 1–1 | | 1–1 | 2–1 |
| Standard | 3–4 | 0–1 | 1–0 | 1–2 | 1–0 | 1–2 | 0–1 | 0–1 | 1–2 | 1–2 | | 1–1 |
| Turan | 0–1 | 0–1 | 2–1 | 1–2 | 1–0 | 2–3 | 0–0 | 1–2 | 0–1 | 1–2 | 3–0 | |

Source: Soccerway.com
Legend: Blue = home team win; Yellow = draw; Red = away team win.

== Second round ==
=== Championship group ===
| Pos | Team | Pld | W | D | L | GF | GA | GD | Pts | Qualification |
|---|---|---|---|---|---|---|---|---|---|---|
| 1 | Inter Baku (C) | 20 | 7 | 8 | 5 | 22 | 19 | +3 | 29 | Qualification for Champions League second qualifying round |
| 2 | Baku | 20 | 7 | 7 | 6 | 19 | 15 | +4 | 28 | Qualification for Europa League second qualifying round (Note: Baku were the winners of the 2009–10 Azerbaijan Cup competition and qualified for the second qualifying round of the UEFA Europa League.) |
| 3 | Qarabağ | 20 | 6 | 9 | 5 | 16 | 18 | −2 | 27 (Note: QAR: 7 pts, 4–3; KHA: 4 pts, 3–4) | Qualification for Europa League first qualifying round |
| 4 | Khazar Lankaran | 20 | 6 | 9 | 5 | 19 | 14 | +5 | 27 | Qualification for Europa League first qualifying round |
| 5 | Neftçi Baku | 20 | 4 | 11 | 5 | 11 | 12 | −1 | 23 | |
| 6 | Gabala | 20 | 4 | 8 | 8 | 18 | 27 | −9 | 20 | |

Source: Soccerway.com
Rules for classification: 1) points; 2) head-to-head points; 3) head-to-head goal difference; 4) head-to-head goals scored; 5) goal difference; 6) number of goals scored.
(C) Champions
Notes:

| Home \ Away | BAK | INT | KHA | NEF | QAR | GAB |
|---|---|---|---|---|---|---|
| Baku | | 0–0 | 1–0 | 1–1 | 2–0 | 1–1 |
| Inter Baku | 1–1 | | 1–0 | 1–1 | 0–1 | 4–1 |
| Khazar Lankaran | 0–1 | 2–2 | | 0–0 | 2–1 | 4–1 |
| Neftçi Baku | 1–0 | 1–0 | 0–0 | | 0–0 | 1–2 |
| Qarabağ | 1–4 | 1–1 | 2–1 | 2–0 | | 1–1 |
| Gabala | 1–0 | 1–1 | 1–2 | 0–0 | 3–1 | |

Source: Soccerway.com
Legend: Blue = home team win; Yellow = draw; Red = away team win.

=== Relegation group ===
| Pos | Team | Pld | W | D | L | GF | GA | GD | Pts | Relegation |
|---|---|---|---|---|---|---|---|---|---|---|
| 7 | Olimpik-Shuvalan | 20 | 10 | 6 | 4 | 27 | 15 | +12 | 36 | |
| 8 | Simurq | 20 | 8 | 7 | 5 | 21 | 21 | 0 | 31 | |
| 9 | Turan | 20 | 7 | 8 | 5 | 27 | 22 | +5 | 29 | |
| 10 | Mughan | 20 | 7 | 6 | 7 | 17 | 16 | +1 | 27 | |
| 11 | Standard (R) | 20 | 7 | 4 | 9 | 26 | 23 | +3 | 25 | Relegation to Azerbaijan First Division |
| 12 | Karvan (R) | 20 | 2 | 7 | 11 | 14 | 35 | −21 | 13 | Relegation to Azerbaijan First Division |

Source: Soccerway.com
Rules for classification: 1) points; 2) goal difference; 3) number of goals scored.
(R) Relegated

| Home \ Away | KAR | MUG | OLS | SIM | STA | TUR |
|---|---|---|---|---|---|---|
| Karvan | | 0–0 | 0–1 | 0–0 | 1–2 | 1–4 |
| Mughan | 2–3 | | 2–1 | 3–1 | 1–0 | 0–0 |
| Olimpik-Shuvalan | 0–0 | 2–0 | | 0–0 | 1–2 | 4–1 |
| Simurq | 0–0 | 1–0 | 0–3 | | 0–4 | 2–1 |
| Standard | 6–0 | 0–2 | 0–1 | 3–1 | | 2–3 |
| Turan | 2–0 | 1–2 | 0–0 | 0–0 | 0–0 | |

Source: Soccerway.com
Legend: Blue = home team win; Yellow = draw; Red = away team win.

== Season statistics ==
=== Top scorers ===
| Rank | Player | Club | Goals |
|---|---|---|---|
| 1 | Farid Guliyev | Standard Sumgayit | 16 |
| 2 | Anatoli Doros | Olimpik-Shuvalan | 12 |
| 2 | Robertas Poškus | Inter Baku | 12 |
| 4 | Adrian Neaga | Neftchi Baku | 11 |
| 5 | Jabá | Baku | 10 |
| 5 | Nadir Nabiev | Turan Tovuz | 10 |
| 7 | Mario Sergio | Baku | 9 |
| 7 | Allan Lalín | Turan Tovuz | 9 |
| 9 | Ģirts Karlsons | Inter Baku | 8 |
| 10 | Khagani Mammadov | Karvan | 7 |

=== Hat-tricks ===
| Player | For | Against | Result | Date |
|---|---|---|---|---|
| Samir Musayev | Turan Tovuz | Mughan | 3–2 | 1 November 2009 |
| Ģirts Karlsons | Inter Baku | Turan Tovuz | 3–1 | 15 May 2010 |
| Anatolie Doroș | Olimpik-Shuvalan | Turan Tovuz | 4–1 | 3 April 2010 |
| Farid Guliyev^{4} | Standard | Karvan | 6–0 | 9 May 2010 |
| Robertas Poškus | Inter Baku | Gabala | 4–1 | 15 May 2010 |
| Nadir Nabiyev | Turan Tovuz | Karvan | 4–1 | 16 May 2010 |
| Farid Guliyev | Standard | Simurq | 4–0 | 16 May 2010 |

- ^{4} Player scored 4 goals

=== Scoring ===
- First goal of the season: Oleg Gvelesiani own goal for Mughan against Standard Baku (14 August 2009)
- Fastest goal of the season: 1st minute,
  - Allan Lalín for Khazar Lankaran against Standard Baku (17 October 2009)
  - Jabá for Baku against Inter Baku (4 April 2010)
- Latest goal of the season: 95th minute,
  - Tomasz Stolpa for Gabala against Neftchi Baku (3 April 2010)
- Largest winning margin: 6 goals
  - Standard Baku 6–0 Karvan (9 May 2010)
- Highest scoring game: 7 goals
  - Mughan 1–6 Inter Baku (18 October 2010)
  - Standard Baku 3–4 Baku (5 December 2009)
- Most goals scored in a match by a single team: 6 goals
  - Standard Baku 6–0 Karvan (9 May 2010)
  - Mughan 1–6 Inter Baku (18 October 2010)
- Most goals scored in a match by a losing team: 3 goals
  - Standard Baku 3–4 Baku (5 December 2009)

=== Clean sheets ===
- Most clean sheets: 17
  - Neftchi Baku
- Fewest clean sheets: 5
  - Mughan

== Awards ==
=== Monthly awards ===
| Month | Player of the Month | |
| Month | Player | Club |
|---|---|---|
| October | Vagif Javadov | FK Qarabağ |
| November | Mario Sergio | Khazar Lankaran |
| December | Afran Ismayilov | FK Qarabağ |
| January | | |
| February | Khagani Mammadov | FK Karvan |
| March | Araz Abdullayev | Neftchi Baku |
| April | | |
| May | | |
