= Agil Nabiyev =

Azerbaijani footballer and manager (born 1982)

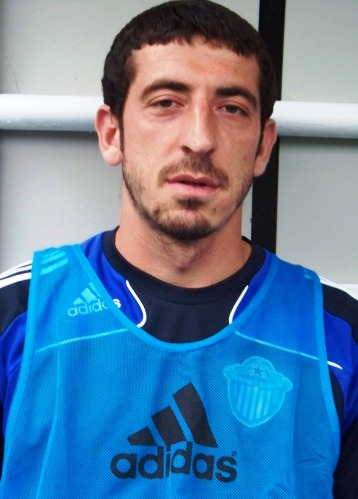

Personal information
- Full name: Aqil Eldar oğlu Nəbiyev
- Date of birth: 16 June 1982 (age 44)
- Place of birth: Tovuz, Azerbaijani SSR
- Height: 1.84 m (6 ft 1/2 in)
- Position: Defender

Team information
- Current team: Shuvalan (Manager)

Senior career*
| Years | Team | Apps | (Gls) |
| 1999–2002 | Turan Tovuz | 26 | (0) |
| 2002–2003 | Neftchi Baku | 7 | (0) |
| 2003–2006 | Turan Tovuz | 30 | (1) |
| 2006–2013 | Shuvalan | 125 | (0) |
| 2013 | Baku | 10 | (1) |
| 2013–2014 | Ravan Baku | 13 | (0) |
| 2014 | Araz-Naxçıvan | 6 | (0) |

International career^{‡}
| 2008–2014 | Azerbaijan | 9 | (0) |

Managerial career
- 2017–2019: Shuvalan
- * Club domestic league appearances and goals as of 8 January 2015 ‡ National team caps and goals as of 28 October 2012

Agil Nabiyev (Azerbaijani: Aqil Nəbiyev; born 16 June 1982) is an Azerbaijani football manager and former player. He was the manager of Shuvalan.

== Career ==
Nabiyev was born in Tovuz.

On 13 January 2013, Nabiyev signed an 18-month contract with FK Baku. In August 2013 Nabiyev signed for Ravan Baku, however in March 2014, after 13 appearances, Nabiyev left Ravan by mutual consent. Nabiyev was made a free agent when Araz-Naxçıvan folded and withdrew from the Azerbaijan Premier League on 17 November 2014.

== Career statistics ==
=== Club ===
As of 13 November 2014

| Club performance | | | League | | Cup | | Continental | | Total | |
| Season | Club | League | Apps | Goals | Apps | Goals | Apps | Goals | Apps | Goals |
| Azerbaijan | | | League | | Azerbaijan Cup | | Europe | | Total | |
|---|---|---|---|---|---|---|---|---|---|---|
| 1999–2000 | Turan Tovuz | Azerbaijan Premier League | 5 | 0 | | | — | | 5 | 0 |
| 2000–01 | Turan Tovuz | Azerbaijan Premier League | 2 | 0 | | | — | | 2 | 0 |
| 2001–02 | Turan Tovuz | Azerbaijan Premier League | 19 | 0 | | | — | | 19 | 0 |
| 2002–03 | | Azerbaijan Premier League | no league championship was held. | | | | | | - | - |
| 2003–04 | Neftchi Baku | Azerbaijan Premier League | 7 | 0 | | | — | | 7 | 0 |
| 2003–04 | Turan Tovuz | Azerbaijan Premier League | 4 | 1 | | | — | | 4 | 1 |
| 2004–05 | Turan Tovuz | Azerbaijan Premier League | 12 | 0 | | | — | | 12 | 0 |
| 2005–06 | Turan Tovuz | Azerbaijan Premier League | 14 | 0 | | | — | | 14 | 0 |
| 2006–07 | AZAL | Azerbaijan Premier League | 10 | 0 | | | — | | 10 | 0 |
| 2007–08 | AZAL | Azerbaijan Premier League | 26 | 0 | | | — | | 26 | 0 |
| 2008–09 | AZAL | Azerbaijan Premier League | 15 | 0 | | | 2 | 0 | 17 | 0 |
| 2009–10 | AZAL | Azerbaijan Premier League | 24 | 0 | | | — | | 24 | 0 |
| 2010–11 | AZAL | Azerbaijan Premier League | 28 | 0 | 5 | 0 | — | | 33 | 0 |
| 2011–12 | AZAL | Azerbaijan Premier League | 20 | 0 | 3 | 0 | 2 | 0 | 25 | 0 |
| 2012–13 | AZAL | Azerbaijan Premier League | 2 | 0 | 0 | 0 | — | | 2 | 0 |
| 2012–13 | Baku | Azerbaijan Premier League | 8 | 1 | 3 | 0 | — | | 11 | 1 |
| 2013–14 | Baku | Azerbaijan Premier League | 2 | 0 | 0 | 0 | — | | 2 | 0 |
| 2013–14 | Ravan Baku | Azerbaijan Premier League | 13 | 0 | 0 | 0 | — | | 13 | 0 |
| 2014–15 | Araz-Naxçıvan | Azerbaijan Premier League | 6 | 0 | 0 | 0 | — | | 6 | 0 |
| 2014–15 | AZAL | Azerbaijan Premier League | 0 | 0 | 0 | 0 | — | | 0 | 0 |
| Total | Azerbaijan | | 217 | 2 | 11 | 0 | 4 | 0 | 232 | 2 |
| Career total | | | 217 | 2 | 11 | 0 | 4 | 0 | 232 | 2 |

=== International ===
As of match played 23 May 2012

Azerbaijan national team
| Year | Apps | Goals |
|---|---|---|
| 2008 | 2 | 0 |
| 2009 | 3 | 0 |
| 2011 | 2 | 0 |
| 2012 | 2 | 0 |
| Total | 9 | 0 |
