= 2009–10 Simurq PFC season =

Simurq
2009–10 season
- Chairman: Zaur Mammadov
- Manager: Roman Pokora
- Stadium: Zaqatala City Stadium
- Premier League: 8th
- Azerbaijan Cup: Last 16 vs Olimpik-Shuvalan
- Europa League: First qualifying round vs Bnei Yehuda
- Top goalscorer: League: Ruslan Hunchak & Elshan Mammadov (7); All: Ruslan Hunchak & Elshan Mammadov (7)
Home colours	Away colours

The Simurq PFC 2009–10 season was Simurq's fourth Azerbaijan Premier League season, which they finished in 8th position. They were knocked out of the Azerbaijan Cup by Olimpik-Shuvalan at the quarterfinal stage. It was their fourth and final season with Roman Pokora as their manager.

== Squad ==
Note: Flags indicate national team as defined under FIFA eligibility rules; some limited exceptions apply. Players may hold more than one non-FIFA nationality.

No.	Pos.	Nation	Player
1	GK	UKR	Taras Chopyk
2	DF	GEO	Teymuraz Gongadze
3	DF	AZE	Rasim Ramaldanov (captain)
8	MF	UKR	Ruslan Hunchak
9	FW	AZE	Elshan Mammadov
11	DF	AZE	Rustam Mammadov
12	GK	AZE	Fuad Ahmadov
15	MF	AZE	Tural Jalilov
17	MF	GEO	Kakhaber Chkhetiani
18	MF	GEO	David Bolkvadze

No.	Pos.	Nation	Player
19	MF	UKR	Yuriy Bulychev
21	FW	BUL	Nikolay Valev
23	MF	GEO	Roman Akhalkatsi
24	MF	UKR	Andriy Raspopov
25	MF	AZE	Ramil Sayadov
27	FW	AZE	Ramin Nasibov
32	FW	MDA	Alexandru Golban
77	GK	UKR	Vitaliy Postranskyi
88	MF	AZE	Jamal Mammadov

== Transfers ==
=== Summer ===
In: Note: Flags indicate national team as defined under FIFA eligibility rules; some limited exceptions apply. Players may hold more than one non-FIFA nationality.

No.	Pos.	Nation	Player
2	DF	GEO	Teymuraz Gongadze (from (Georgia (country)) Olimpi Rustavi)
7	MF	LAT	Genādijs Soloņicins (from (Latvia) Liepājas Metalurgs)
10	MF	MDA	Alexandru Popovici (loan from (Moldova) Tiligul-Tiras Tiraspol)
21	FW	BUL	Nikolay Valev (from (Bulgaria) Slavia Sofia)
23	MF	GEO	Roman Akhalkatsi (from (Azerbaijan) Olimpik Baku)
27	FW	BLR	Andrey Sherakow (from (Belarus) Torpedo-BelAZ Zhodino)
32	DF	UKR	Andriy Sokolenko (from (Ukraine) Kharkiv)
33	FW	AZE	Daniel Akhtyamov (from (Belarus) Minsk)
44	GK	AZE	Rauf Mehdiyev (from (Azerbaijan) Olimpik Baku)
77	GK	UKR	Vitaliy Postranskyi (from (Ukraine) Metalurh Zaporizhya)

Out: Note: Flags indicate national team as defined under FIFA eligibility rules; some limited exceptions apply. Players may hold more than one non-FIFA nationality.

No.	Pos.	Nation	Player
10	MF	MDA	Alexandru Popovici (loan return to (Georgia (country)) Tiligul-Tiras Tiraspol)
13	MF	UKR	Volodymyr Mazyar (to (Ukraine) Arsenal-Kyivshchyna Bila Tserkva)
20	MF	GEO	Mikheil Makhviladze (to (Georgia (country)) Sioni Bolnisi)
21	MF	AZE	Aleksandr Chertoganov (loan return to (Azerbaijan) Neftchi Baku)
22	MF	GEO	Grigol Dolidze (to (Moldova) Olimpi Rustavi)
23	DF	AZE	Fizuli Mammedov (loan return to (Azerbaijan) Khazar Lankaran)

=== Winter ===
In: Note: Flags indicate national team as defined under FIFA eligibility rules; some limited exceptions apply. Players may hold more than one non-FIFA nationality.

No.	Pos.	Nation	Player
5	DF	SRB	Dragan Perišić (from (Ukraine) Metalurh Zaporizhya)
24	MF	UKR	Andriy Raspopov (from (Belarus) Granit Mikashevichi)
32	FW	MDA	Alexandru Golban (from (Kazakhstan) Tobol)
33	MF	SRB	Nenad Begović (from (Israel) Ashdod)

Out: Note: Flags indicate national team as defined under FIFA eligibility rules; some limited exceptions apply. Players may hold more than one non-FIFA nationality.

No.	Pos.	Nation	Player
4	DF	UKR	Aleksandr Malygin (to (Ukraine) Zakarpattia)
5	DF	AZE	Sergei Sokolov (to (Azerbaijan) Gabala)
5	DF	SRB	Dragan Perišić (to (Bangladesh) Sheikh Jamal)
7	MF	LAT	Genādijs Soloņicins (to (Latvia) Liepājas Metalurgs)
14	FW	UKR	Serhiy Artiukh (to (Ukraine) Poltava)
27	FW	BLR	Andrey Sherakow (to (Belarus) Minsk)
32	DF	UKR	Andriy Sokolenko
33	FW	AZE	Daniel Akhtyamov
33	MF	SRB	Nenad Begović (to (Canada) Brantford Galaxy)
44	GK	AZE	Rauf Mehdiyev (to (Azerbaijan) Karvan)

== Competitions ==
=== Azerbaijan Premier League ===
==== First round ====
===== Results =====
16 August 2009 1	Gabala	2 - 1	Simurq	Qabala
18:00 AZST (UTC+5)	Karimov 11'; Melnyk 23'	Summary	Artiukh 34'	Stadium: Gabala City Stadium; Attendance: 2,600; Referee: Rovshan Ahmadov

23 September 2009 2	Simurq	0 - 0	Inter Baku	Zaqatala
16:00 AZST (UTC+5)		Summary		Stadium: Zaqatala City Stadium; Attendance: 3,000; Referee: Anar Salmanov

20 October 2009 3	Standard	1 - 2	Simurq	Sumgayit
16:00 AZST (UTC+5)	Guliyev 3'	Summary	Bolkvadze 30'; Y.Bulychev 37'	Stadium: Mehdi Huseynzade Stadium; Attendance: 1,000; Referee: Anar Salmanov

12 September 2009 4	Baku	1 - 2	Simurq	Baku
18:00 AZST (UTC+5)	Šolić 65'	Summary	Mammadov 54'; Hunchak 75'	Stadium: Tofig Bakhramov Stadium; Attendance: 500; Referee: Fariz Yusifov

20 September 2009 5	Simurq	1 - 0	Qarabağ	Zaqatala
21:00 AZST (UTC+5)	Artiukh 6'	Summary		Stadium: Zaqatala City Stadium; Attendance: 1,500; Referee: Afgan Hamzayev

27 September 2009 6	Neftchi Baku	0 - 1	Simurq	Baku
16:15 AZST (UTC+5)		Summary	Sokolov 24'	Stadium: Tofik Bakhramov Stadium; Attendance: 700; Referee: Fariz Yusifov

17 October 2009 7	Simurq	2 - 0	Karvan	Zaqatala
19:00 AZST (UTC+5)	Mammadov 34'; Hunchak 52'	Summary		Stadium: Zaqatala City Stadium; Attendance: 450; Referee: Elchin Mämmädov

24 October 2009 8	Khazar Lankaran	3 - 0	Simurq	Lankaran
18:00 AZST (UTC+5)	Lalín 4'; Calincov 24'; Tsvetkov 48'	Summary		Stadium: Lankaran City Stadium; Attendance: 6,500; Referee: Azad Mutallimov

31 October 2009 9	Simurq	1 - 1	Inter Baku	Zaqatala
18:00 AZT (UTC+4)	Chkhetiani 6'	Summary	Odikadze 49'	Stadium: Zaqatala City Stadium; Attendance: 1,000; Referee: Vusal Äliyev

8 November 2009 10	Olimpik-Shuvalan	0 - 3	Simurq	Baku
14:00 AZT (UTC+4)	V.Hagverdiyev (yellow card) 17' (yellow-red card) 69'	Summary	E.Mammadov 10'; Hunchak 69' (pen.); Valev 10'	Stadium: Shafa Stadium; Attendance: 100; Referee: Anar Salmanov

21 November 2009 11	Simurq	2 - 1	Turan Tovuz	Zaqatala
18:00 AZT (UTC+4)	Soloņicins 38'; Chkhetiani 62'	Summary	R.Abbasov 29'	Stadium: Zaqatala City Stadium; Attendance: 1,000; Referee: Elnur Muradov

28 November 2009 12	Simurq	1 - 1	Gabala	Zaqatala
18:00 AZT (UTC+4)	Mammadov 47'	Summary	Malygin 86' (o.g.)	Stadium: Zaqatala City Stadium; Attendance: 2,000; Referee: Elchin Mämmädov

6 December 2010 13	Mughan	0 - 0	Simurq	Salyan
14:00 AZT (UTC+4)		Summary		Stadium: Salyan Olympic Sport Complex Stadium; Attendance: 800; Referee: Azad Mutallimov

9 December 2010 14	Simurq	1 - 1	Standard	Zaqatala
18:00 AZT (UTC+4)	Valev 20'	Summary	Guliyev 22'	Stadium: Zaqatala City Stadium; Attendance: 950; Referee: Rasim Mämmädov

13 December 2009 15	Simurq	1 - 2	Baku	Zaqatala
18:00 AZT (UTC+4)	Hunchak 45' (pen.)	Summary	Fábio 5'; Šolić 65'	Stadium: Zaqatala City Stadium; Attendance: 3,050; Referee: Azer Hamzayev

20 December 2009 16	Qarabağ	0 - 0	Simurq	Baku^{1}
14:15 AZT (UTC+4)		Summary		Stadium: Tofiq Bahramov Stadium; Attendance: 2,500; Referee: Anar Salmanov

26 December 2009 17	Simurq	0 - 0	Neftchi Baku	Zaqatala
15:00 AZT (UTC+4)		Summary		Stadium: Zaqatala City Stadium; Attendance: Elnur Muradov; Referee: 500

3 February 2010 18	Karvan	3 - 2	Simurq	Yevlakh
14:00 AZT (UTC+4)	Mammadov 5', 64'; Marcos 42'	Summary	Perišić 35'; Intskirveli 74' (o.g.)	Stadium: Yevlakh City Stadium; Attendance: 2,000; Referee: Fariz Yusifov

9 February 2010 19	Simurq	1 - 2	Khazar Lankaran	Zaqatala
17:00 AZT (UTC+4)	Hunchak 81' (pen.)	Summary	Juninho; Cristian 67'	Stadium: Zaqatala City Stadium; Attendance: 2,000; Referee: Afgan Hamzayev

13 February 2010 20	Inter Baku	2 - 1	Simurq	Baku
18:00 AZT (UTC+4)	Poškus 25'; Navalovski 45'	Summary	Hunchak 54' (pen.)	Stadium: Shafa Stadium; Attendance: 800; Referee: Hacieli Ağayev

17 February 2010 21	Simurq	2 - 0	Olimpik-Shuvalan	Zaqatala
14:00 AZT (UTC+4)	Hunchak 16'; Golban 39'; Jalilov (red card) 85'	Summary	Ismael Gaúcho (red card) 52'	Stadium: Zaqatala City Stadium; Attendance: 600; Referee: Rasim Mämmädov

21 February 2010 22	Turan Tovuz	1 - 2	Simurq	Tovuz
14:00 AZT (UTC+4)	P.Kolawole 90+3'	Summary	Bolkvadze 14', 63'	Stadium: Tovuz City Stadium; Attendance: 2,300; Referee: Azad Mutallimov

===== League table =====
Pos	Team	Pld	W	D	L	GF	GA	GD	Pts	Qualification
5	Gabala	22	10	6	6	24	21	+3	36	Qualification for championship group
6	Neftçi Baku	22	9	8	5	20	14	+6	35	Qualification for championship group
7	Simurq	22	9	7	6	26	21	+5	34	Qualification for relegation group
8	Olimpik-Shuvalan	22	6	7	9	20	23	−3	25	Qualification for relegation group
9	Turan	22	4	5	13	23	32	−9	17	Qualification for relegation group

Source: Soccerway.com
Rules for classification: 1) points; 2) goal difference; 3) number of goals scored.

==== Relegation group ====
===== Results =====
12 March 2010 23	Simurq	0 - 0	Karvan	Zaqatala
15:00 AZT (UTC+4)		Summary		Stadium: Zaqatala City Stadium; Attendance: 250; Referee: Jeyhun Hashimov

20 March 2010 24	Simurq	0 - 3	Olimpik-Shuvalan	Zaqatala
15:00 AZT (UTC+4)		Summary	Ibekoyi 10'; Claudiano 38'; Doroș 39'	Stadium: Zaqatala City Stadium; Attendance: 300; Referee: Elchin Mämmädov

27 March 2010 25	Turan Tovuz	0 - 0	Simurq	Tovuz
16:00 AZT (UTC+4)		Summary		Stadium: Tovuz City Stadium; Attendance: 1,600; Referee: Azad Mutallimov

3 April 2010 26	Simurq	1 - 0	Mughan	Zaqatala
16:00 AZST (UTC+5)	Mammadov 16'	Summary		Stadium: Zaqatala City Stadium; Attendance: 300; Referee: Hajieli Ağayev

10 April 2010 27	Standard	3 - 1	Simurq	Sumgayit
16:00 AZST (UTC+5)	Mazyar 36'; Guliyev 49'; Requelme 77'	Summary	Mammadov 47'	Stadium: Mehdi Huseynzade Stadium; Attendance: 1,500; Referee: Elnur Muradov

17 April 2010 28	Karvan	0 - 0	Simurq	Yevlakh
16:00 AZST (UTC+5)	M.Hamroyev (yellow card) 35' (yellow-red card) 59'; Pereira (yellow card) 32' (yellow-red card) 82'	Summary		Stadium: Yevlakh City Stadium; Attendance: 500; Referee: Rahim Häsänov

23 April 2010 29	Olimpik-Shuvalan	0 - 0	Simurq	Baku
16:00 AZST (UTC+5)		Summary		Stadium: Shafa Stadium; Attendance: 200; Referee: Elnur Muradov

1 May 2010 30	Simurq	2 - 1	Turan Tovuz	Zaqatala
AZST (UTC+5)	Golban 39'; Elsh.Mammadov 80'	Summary	Eln.Mammadov 67'	Stadium: Zaqatala City Stadium; Attendance: 200; Referee: Afgan Hamzayev

9 May 2010 31	Mughan	3 - 1	Simurq	Salyan
17:15 AZST (UTC+5)	M.Zečević 26'; Akhundov 52'; Jugo 87'	Summary	Jalilov 16'	Stadium: Salyan Olympic Sport Complex Stadium; Attendance: 500; Referee: Rahim Häsänov

16 May 2010 32	Simurq	0 - 4	Standard	Zaqatala
17:15 AZST (UTC+5)		Summary	İsayev 14'; Guliyev 18', 88', 90+2'	Stadium: Zaqatala City Stadium; Attendance: 400; Referee: Fuad Häsänov

===== Table =====
Pos	Team	Pld	W	D	L	GF	GA	GD	Pts	Relegation
7	Olimpik-Shuvalan	20	10	6	4	27	15	+12	36	
8	Simurq	20	8	7	5	21	21	0	31	
9	Turan	20	7	8	5	27	22	+5	29	
10	Mughan	20	7	6	7	17	16	+1	27	
11	Standard (R)	20	7	4	9	26	23	+3	25	Relegation to Azerbaijan First Division

Source: Soccerway.com
Rules for classification: 1) points; 2) goal difference; 3) number of goals scored.
(R) Relegated

=== Azerbaijan Cup ===
4 November 2009 First round 1st leg	Simurq	2 - 0	Ganca	Zaqatala
18:00 AZT (UTC+4)	Artiukh 45'; Y.Bulychev 55'	Summary		Stadium: Zaqatala City Stadium

11 November 2009 First round 2nd leg	Ganca	0 - 1 (0 - 3 agg.)	Simurq	Ganja
13:30 AZT (UTC+4)		Summary	R.Mammadov 10'	Stadium: Ganja City Stadium

7 March 2010 Quarterfinal 1st leg	Simurq	0 - 0	Olimpik-Shuvalan	Zaqatala
15:00 AZT (UTC+4)		Summary; Summary		Stadium: Zaqatala City Stadium; Attendance: 400; Referee: Elnur Muradov

16 March 2010 Quarterfinal 2nd leg	Olimpik-Shuvalan	0 - 0 (0 - 0 agg.) (4 – 2 p)	Simurq	Baku
15:00 AZT (UTC+4)		Summary; Summary		Stadium: Shafa Stadium; Attendance: 850; Referee: Azad Mutallimov

=== UEFA Europa League ===
==== Qualifying phase ====
2 July 2009 First qualifying round 1st leg	Simurq (Azerbaijan)	0 – 1	(Israel) Bnei Yehuda	Baku^{1}, Azerbaijan
29:00 AZST (UTC+5)		Summary	Baldout 83'	Stadium: Tofik Bakhramov Stadium; Attendance: 11,500; Referee: Richard Trutz (Slovakia)

9 July 2009 First qualifying round 2nd leg	Bnei Yehuda (Israel)	3 – 0 (4 – 0 agg.)	(Azerbaijan) Simurq	Tel Aviv, Israel
20:00 AZST (UTC+5)	Galván 27', 66'; Biton 86'	Summary		Stadium: Bloomfield Stadium; Attendance: 2,937; Referee: Radek Příhoda (Czech Republic)

== Squad statistics ==
=== Appearances and goals ===
No.	Pos	Nat	Player	Total		Premier League		Azerbaijan Cup		Europa League	
No.	Pos	Nat	Player	Apps	Goals	Apps	Goals	Apps	Goals	Apps	Goals
1	GK	(Ukraine) UKR	Taras Chopik	10	0	10	0	0	0	0+0	0
2	MF	(Georgia (country)) GEO	Teymuraz Gongadze	12	0	12	0	0	0	0+0	0
3	DF	(Azerbaijan) AZE	Rasim Ramaldanov	11	0	11	0	0	0	0+0	0
8	MF	(Ukraine) UKR	Ruslan Hunchak	32	7	31	7	0	0	1+0	0
9	FW	(Azerbaijan) AZE	Elshan Mammadov	32	7	30	7	0	0	1+1	0
11	DF	(Azerbaijan) AZE	Rustam Mammadov	10	0	10	0	0	0	0+0	0
12	GK	(Azerbaijan) AZE	Fuad Ahmadov	2	0	2	0	0	0	0+0	0
15	MF	(Azerbaijan) AZE	Tural Jalilov	29	1	28	1	0	0	0+1	0
17	MF	(Georgia (country)) GEO	Kakhaber Chkhetiani	30	2	28	2	0	0	2+0	0
18	MF	(Georgia (country)) GEO	David Bolkvadze	31	3	29	3	0	0	2+0	0
19	MF	(Ukraine) UKR	Yuri Bulychev	32	1	30	1	0	0	2+0	0
21	FW	(Bulgaria) BUL	Nikolay Valev	19	2	17	2	0	0	2+0	0
23	MF	(Georgia (country)) GEO	Roman Akhalkatsi	20	0	18	0	0	0	2+0	0
24	DF	(Ukraine) UKR	Andriy Raspopov	5	0	5	0	0	0	0+0	0
25	MF	(Azerbaijan) AZE	Ramil Sayadov	12	0	12	0	0	0	0+0	0
27	FW	(Azerbaijan) AZE	Ramin Nasibov	8	0	8	0	0	0	0+0	0
32	FW	(Moldova) MDA	Alexandru Golban	15	2	15	2	0	0	0+0	0
77	GK	(Ukraine) UKR	Vitaliy Postranskyi	18	0	18	0	0	0	0+0	0
88	MF	(Azerbaijan) AZE	Jamal Mammadov	11	0	11	0	0	0	0+0	0
	MF	(Azerbaijan) AZE	Ramil Ağayev	6	0	6	0	0	0	0+0	0
	GK	(Azerbaijan) AZE	Səbuhi Əhmədov	2	0	2	0	0	0	0+0	0
	FW	(Azerbaijan) AZE	Laçın Şəkərov	2	0	2	0	0	0	0+0	0
	DF	(Azerbaijan) AZE	Ilkin Qirtimov	1	0	1	0	0	0	0+0	0
Players who appeared for Simurq who left during the season:
4	DF	(Ukraine) UKR	Aleksandr Malygin	21	0	19	0	0	0	2+0	0
5	MF	(Azerbaijan) AZE	Sergei Sokolov	18	1	16	1	0	0	2+0	0
5	DF	(Serbia) SRB	Dragan Perišić	4	1	4	1	0	0	0+0	0
7	MF	(Latvia) LAT	Genādijs Soloņicins	20	1	18	1	0	0	1+1	0
10	MF	(Moldova) MDA	Alexandru Popovici	2	0	0	0	0	0	1+1	0
13	FW	(Ukraine) UKR	Volodymyr Mazyar	1	0	0	0	0	0	0+1	0
14	FW	(Ukraine) UKR	Serhiy Artiukh	21	2	19	2	0	0	2+0	0
20	DF	(Georgia (country)) GEO	Mikheil Makhviladze	1	0	0	0	0	0	1+0	0
22	MF	(Georgia (country)) GEO	Grigol Dolidze	1	0	0	0	0	0	1+0	0
27	FW	(Belarus) BLR	Andrey Sherakow	7	0	7	0	0	0	0+0	0
32	DF	(Ukraine) UKR	Andriy Sokolenko	9	0	9	0	0	0	0+0	0
33	FW	(Azerbaijan) AZE	Daniel Akhtyamov	3	0	3	0	0	0	0+0	0
33	MF	(Serbia) SRB	Nenad Begović	4	0	4	0	0	0	0+0	0
44	GK	(Azerbaijan) AZE	Rauf Mehdiyev	2	0	0	0	0	0	2+0	0

=== Goal scorers ===
Place	Position	Nation	Number	Name	Premier League	Azerbaijan Cup	Europa League	Total
1	MF	(Ukraine)	8	Ruslan Hunchak	7	0	0	7
1	FW	(Azerbaijan)	9	Elshan Mammadov	7	0	0	7
3	MF	(Georgia (country))	18	David Bolkvadze	3	0	0	3
3	FW	(Ukraine)	14	Serhiy Artiukh	2	1	0	3
5	MF	(Georgia (country))	17	Kakhaber Chkhetiani	2	0	0	2
5	FW	(Bulgaria)	21	Nikolay Valev	2	0	0	2
5	FW	(Moldova)	32	Alexandru Golban	2	0	0	2
5	FW	(Ukraine)	19	Yuriy Bulychev	1	1	0	2
9	MF	(Azerbaijan)	15	Tural Jalilov	1	0	0	1
9	MF	(Latvia)	7	Genādijs Soloņicins	1	0	0	1
9	DF	(Azerbaijan)	5	Sergei Sokolov	1	0	0	1
9	DF	(Serbia)	5	Dragan Perišić	1	0	0	1
9	FW	(Azerbaijan)	11	Rustam Mammadov	0	1	0	1
9				Own goal	1	0	0	1
				TOTALS	31	3	0	34

== Notes ==
- Note 1: Played in Baku at Tofik Bakhramov Stadium as Simurq Zaqatala's Zaqatala City Stadium did not meet UEFA criteria.
