= 2009–10 AZAL PFC season =

Olimpik-Shuvalan
2009–10 season
- Chairman: Zaur Akhundov
- Manager: Nazim Suleymanov
- Stadium: Shafa Stadium
- Premier League: 7th
- Azerbaijan Cup: Semi-finals vs Khazar Lankaran
- Top goalscorer: League: Anatolie Doroș (12); All: Anatolie Doroș (14)
Home colours	Away colours

The Olimpik-Shuvalan 2009–10 season was Olimpik-Shuvalan's fifth Azerbaijan Premier League season and their first season with Nazim Suleymanov as manager. They participated in the 2009–10 Azerbaijan Premier League as well as the 2009–10 Azerbaijan Cup, finishing the league in 7th place and being knocked out of the Cup at the Semifinal stage by Khazar Lankaran.

== Squad ==
Note: Flags indicate national team as defined under FIFA eligibility rules; some limited exceptions apply. Players may hold more than one non-FIFA nationality.

No.	Pos.	Nation	Player
1	GK	AZE	Elshan Poladov
2	DF	MDA	Serghei Laşcencov
3	DF	AZE	Nduka Usim
4	MF	GEO	Roman Goginashvili
5	MF	BRA	Diano
7	DF	AZE	Agil Nabiyev
9	FW	MDA	Anatolie Doroș
10	MF	RUS	Nugzar Kvirtiya
11	DF	SRB	Dragan Mandic
12	GK	AZE	Jahangir Hasanzade
13	FW	AZE	Nariman Äzimov

No.	Pos.	Nation	Player
15	MF	AZE	Huseyn Akhundov
17	MF	AZE	Tarlan Khalilov
18	MF	AZE	Ilgar Gurbanov
23	FW	NGR	Victor Igbekoyi
—	DF	SRB	Mirko Bunjevčević
—	MF	AZE	Orkhan Safiyaroglu
—	FW	AZE	Samir Abdulov
—	FW	AZE	Vusal Garaev
—	FW	BRA	Junivan
—	FW	BRA	Ismael Gaúcho

== Transfers ==
=== Summer ===
In: Note: Flags indicate national team as defined under FIFA eligibility rules; some limited exceptions apply. Players may hold more than one non-FIFA nationality.

No.	Pos.	Nation	Player
4	MF	GEO	Roman Goginashvili
6	MF	GUI	Abdoul Kader Camara (from (Azerbaijan) Gabala)
9	FW	MDA	Anatolie Doroș (from (Azerbaijan) Karvan)
10	MF	RUS	Nugzar Kvirtiya (from (Russia) FC Znamya)
15	MF	AZE	Huseyn Akhundov (from (Azerbaijan) MOIK Baku)
17	MF	AZE	Tarlan Khalilov (from (Azerbaijan) FK Mughan)
18	MF	AZE	Ilgar Gurbanov (from (Turkey) Sivasspor)
19	MF	BLR	Artsyom Vaskow (from (Belarus) Neman Grodno)
22	MF	FRA	Ender Günlü (from (Switzerland) Racing Club Genève)
23	FW	NGR	Victor Igbekoyi (from (Azerbaijan) Turan Tovuz)
24	FW	LAT	Nikolajs Kozačuks (from (Latvia) Tukums 2000)
—	MF	AZE	Vusal Garaev (from (Azerbaijan) FK Mughan)

Out: Note: Flags indicate national team as defined under FIFA eligibility rules; some limited exceptions apply. Players may hold more than one non-FIFA nationality.

No.	Pos.	Nation	Player
1	GK	AZE	Zabit Safarov (to (Azerbaijan) Khazar Lankaran)
4	DF	AZE	Tarlan Ahmadov (Retired)
8	FW	BRA	Junivan (to (Azerbaijan) Turan Tovuz)
10	MF	TUN	Bechir Mogaadi (to (Azerbaijan) Karvan)
17	DF	AZE	Ramin Guliyev (to (Azerbaijan) Standard Sumgayit)
19	MF	GEO	Revaz Getsadze (to (Azerbaijan) Gabala)
20	MF	AZE	Nizami Hajiyev (to (Azerbaijan) Khazar Lankaran)
25	DF	AZE	Mahir Shukurov (to (Azerbaijan) Inter Baku)
35	MF	GEO	Roman Akhalkatsi (to (Azerbaijan) Simurq)
44	GK	AZE	Rauf Mehdiyev (to (Azerbaijan) Simurq)
55	FW	AZE	Leandro Gomes (to (Azerbaijan) Karvan)

=== Winter ===
In: Note: Flags indicate national team as defined under FIFA eligibility rules; some limited exceptions apply. Players may hold more than one non-FIFA nationality.

No.	Pos.	Nation	Player
—	DF	SRB	Mirko Bunjevčević (from (Serbia) FK Čukarički)
—	MF	AZE	Orkhan Safiyaroglu (from (Azerbaijan) Baku)
—	FW	BRA	Junivan (from (Azerbaijan) Turan Tovuz)
—	FW	BRA	Ismael Gaúcho (from (Portugal) Pinhalnovense)

Out: Note: Flags indicate national team as defined under FIFA eligibility rules; some limited exceptions apply. Players may hold more than one non-FIFA nationality.

No.	Pos.	Nation	Player
6	MF	GUI	Abdoul Kader Camara (to (Azerbaijan) Gabala)
8	DF	AZE	Fizuli Mammedov (to (Azerbaijan) FK Karvan)
14	DF	AZE	Vasif Hagverdiyev
16	MF	RUS	Ramaz Dzhabnidze (to (Russia) FC Nara-ShBFR Naro-Fominsk)
19	MF	BLR	Artsyom Vaskow (to (Latvia) SK Blāzma)
20	FW	AZE	Ramin Nasibov (to (Azerbaijan) Simurq)
22	MF	FRA	Ender Günlü (to (Bulgaria) Akademik Sofia)
24	FW	LAT	Nikolajs Kozačuks (to (Latvia) FC Tranzit)

== Competitions ==
=== Azerbaijan Premier League ===
==== Results ====
16 August 2009 1	Olimpik-Shuvalan	0 - 1	Neftchi Baku	Baku
20:00 AZST (UTC+5)	Camara (yellow card) 70' (yellow-red card) 70'	Summary	Naidin 10'	Stadium: Shafa Stadium; Attendance: 800; Referee: Vusal Aliyev

23 August 2009 2	FK Karvan	2 - 3	Olimpik-Shuvalan	Yevlakh
19:00 AZST (UTC+5)	Usim 19' (o.g.); Gomes 90+1'	Summary	Doroș 14', 28'; Diano 37'	Stadium: Yevlakh Stadium; Attendance: 2,400; Referee: Azad Mutallimov

13 September 2009 4	Inter Baku	2 - 2	Olimpik-Shuvalan	Baku
18:00 AZST (UTC+5)	Karlsons 78'; Rubins 84'	Summary	Goginashvili 5'; Doroş 50'	Stadium: Shafa Stadium; Attendance: 300; Referee: Anar Salmanov

20 September 2009 5	Olimpik-Shuvalan	0 - 1	Baku	Baku
18:00 AZST (UTC+5)		Summary	Skulić 63'	Stadium: Shafa Stadium; Attendance: 400; Referee: Vusal Aliyev

27 September 2009 6	Olimpik-Shuvalan	3 - 3	Turan Tovuz	Baku
17:00 AZST (UTC+5)	Goginashvili 23'; Kvirtiya 52'; Doroş 90+1'	Summary	R.Hasanov 61', 90+2'; A.Kovalevsky 71'	Stadium: Shafa Stadium; Attendance: 1,500; Referee: Elnur Muradov

17 October 2009 7	Gabala	2 - 1	Olimpik-Shuvalan	Qabala
16:00 AZST (UTC+5)	Kerimov 60'; Diano 68' (o.g.)	Summary	Doroş 55'	Stadium: Gabala City Stadium; Attendance: 1,000; Referee: Vusal Aliyev

21 October 2009 3	Olimpik-Shuvalan	1 - 0	Khazar Lankaran	Baku
16:00 AZST (UTC+5)	Doroş 29'	Summary		Stadium: Shafa Stadium; Attendance: 2,500; Referee: Elchin Mämmädov

24 October 2009 8	Olimpik-Shuvalan	0 - 0	FK Mughan	Baku
15:00 AZT (UTC+4)		Summary		Stadium: Shafa Stadium; Attendance: 200; Referee: Rovshan Ahmadov

1 November 2009 9	Standard	0 - 1	Olimpik-Shuvalan	Sumgayit
14:00 AZT (UTC+4)	Huseynov (yellow card) 78' (red card) 79'	Summary	Khalilov 90'	Stadium: Mehdi Huseynzade Stadium; Attendance: 600; Referee: Afgan Hamzayev

8 November 2009 10	Olimpik-Shuvalan	0 - 3	Simurq	Baku
14:00 AZT (UTC+4)	V.Hagverdiyev (yellow card) 17' (yellow-red card) 69'	Summary	E.Mammadov 10'; Hunchak 69' (pen.); Valev 10'	Stadium: Shafa Stadium; Attendance: 100; Referee: Anar Salmanov

22 November 2009 11	Qarabağ	1 - 0	Olimpik-Shuvalan	Baku^{1}
14:15 AZT (UTC+4)	Ismayilov 70'; Allahverdiyev (yellow card) 24' (yellow-red card) 75'	Summary	Laşcencov (yellow card) 39' (yellow-red card) 86'	Stadium: Tofiq Bahramov Stadium; Attendance: 1,600; Referee: Elchin Mämmädov

29 November 2009 12	Neftchi Baku	0 - 0	Olimpik-Shuvalan	Baku
14:00 AZT (UTC+4)		Summary		Stadium: Tofik Bakhramov Stadium; Attendance: 500; Referee: Rovshan Ahmadov

4 December 2009 13	Olimpik-Shuvalan	4 - 0	FK Karvan	Baku
14:00 AZT (UTC+4)	Mandić 12'; Doroș 50'; A.Häsänov 52' (o.g.); Kvirtiya 69'	Summary	Berdiýew (red card) 51'	Stadium: Shafa Stadium; Attendance: 200; Referee: Rauf Jabbarov

10 December 2009 14	Khazar Lankaran	2 - 1	Olimpik-Shuvalan	Lankaran
16:00 AZT (UTC+4)	Lalín 27'; Camara 63' (o.g.); Mario Sergio (red card) 87'	Summary	Igbekoyi 29'	Stadium: Lankaran City Stadium; Attendance: 5,000; Referee: Afgan Hamzayev

13 December 2009 15	Olimpik-Shuvalan	0 - 1	Inter Baku	Baku
16:00 AZT (UTC+4)		Summary	Karlsons 47'	Stadium: Shafa Stadium; Attendance: 400; Referee: Elnur Muradov

20 December 2009 16	Baku	0 - 0	Olimpik-Shuvalan	Baku
14:00 AZT (UTC+4)		Summary		Stadium: Tofig Bakhramov Stadium; Attendance: 200; Referee: Elchin Mämmädov

26 December 2009 17	Turan Tovuz	0 - 0	Olimpik-Shuvalan	Tovuz
14:00 AZT (UTC+4)		Summary		Stadium: Tovuz City Stadium; Attendance: 1,000; Referee: Hajieli Ağayev

2 February 2010 18	Olimpik-Shuvalan	0 - 2	Gabala	Baku
14:00 AZT (UTC+4)		Summary	Torres 11', 43'	Stadium: Shafa Stadium; Attendance: 400; Referee: Rasim Mammadov

9 February 2010 19	Mughan	0 - 1	Olimpik-Shuvalan	Salyan
13:00 AZT (UTC+4)		Summary	Hasanzade (red card) 28'; Ismael Gaúcho 34'	Stadium: Salyan Olympic Sport Complex Stadium; Attendance: 600; Referee: Elnur Muradov

13 February 2010 20	Olimpik-Shuvalan	2 - 0	Standard	Baku
13:00 AZT (UTC+4)	Ismael Gaúcho 15', 60'	Summary		Stadium: Shafa Stadium; Attendance: 300; Referee: Elnur Muradov

17 February 2010 21	Simurq	2 - 0	Olimpik-Shuvalan	Zaqatala
14:00 AZT (UTC+4)	Hunchak 16'; Golban 39'; Jalilov (red card) 85'	Summary	Ismael Gaúcho (red card) 52'	Stadium: Zaqatala City Stadium; Attendance: 600; Referee: Rasim Mämmädov

20 February 2010 22	Olimpik-Shuvalan	1 - 1	Qarabağ	Baku
14:00 AZT (UTC+4)	Gurbanov 63'	Summary	Teli 75'	Stadium: Shafa Stadium; Attendance: 500; Referee: Afgan Hamzayev

==== Table ====
Pos	Team	Pld	W	D	L	GF	GA	GD	Pts	Qualification
6	Neftçi Baku	22	9	8	5	20	14	+6	35	Qualification for championship group
7	Simurq	22	9	7	6	26	21	+5	34	Qualification for relegation group
8	Olimpik-Shuvalan	22	6	7	9	20	23	−3	25	Qualification for relegation group
9	Turan	22	4	5	13	23	32	−9	17	Qualification for relegation group
10	Mughan	22	3	7	12	12	27	−15	16	Qualification for relegation group

Source: Soccerway.com
Rules for classification: 1) points; 2) goal difference; 3) number of goals scored.

=== Azerbaijan Premier League Relegation Group ===
==== Results ====
12 March 2010 23	Olimpik-Shuvalan	1 - 2	Standard	Baku
15:00 AZT (UTC+4)	Bunjevcevic 37'	Summary	Requelme Chiappa 68'; Guliyev 75'	Stadium: Shafa Stadium; Attendance: 300; Referee: Rauf Jabbarov

20 March 2010 24	Simurq	0 - 3	Olimpik-Shuvalan	Zaqatala
15:00 AZT (UTC+4)		Summary	Igbekoyi 10'; Diano 38'; Doroș 39'	Stadium: Zaqatala City Stadium; Attendance: 300; Referee: Elchin Mämmädov

28 March 2010 25	Olimpik-Shuvalan	0 - 0	FK Karvan	Baku
16:00 AZT (UTC+4)		Summary		Stadium: Shafa Stadium; Attendance: 300; Referee: Zohrab Aliyev

3 April 2010 26	Olimpik-Shuvalan	4 - 1	Turan Tovuz	Baku
16:00 AZST (UTC+5)	Doroș 2', 41', 44'; Diano 62'	Summary	Nabiev 85'	Stadium: Shafa Stadium; Attendance: 200; Referee: Rahim Häsänov

10 April 2010 27	FK Mughan	2 - 1	Olimpik-Shuvalan	Salyan
16:00 AZST (UTC+5)	V.Huseynov 45'; Ismayilov 54'	Summary	Doroș 59'	Stadium: Salyan Olympic Sport Complex Stadium; Attendance: 860; Referee: Azad Mutallimov

18 April 2010 28	Standard	0 - 1	Olimpik-Shuvalan	Sumgayit
16:00 AZST (UTC+5)		Summary	Igbekoyi 54'	Stadium: Mehdi Huseynzade Stadium; Attendance: 1,000; Referee: Elchin Mämmädov

23 April 2010 29	Olimpik-Shuvalan	0 - 0	Simurq	Baku
16:00 AZST (UTC+5)		Summary		Stadium: Shafa Stadium; Attendance: 200; Referee: Elnur Muradov

1 May 2010 30	FK Karvan	0 - 1	Olimpik-Shuvalan	Yevlakh
17:00 AZST (UTC+5)	J.Adışirinov (red card) 85'	Summary	Gurbanov 50'	Stadium: Yevlakh Stadium; Attendance: 500; Referee: Ramil Diniyev

9 May 2010 31	Turan Tovuz	0 - 0	Olimpik-Shuvalan	Tovuz
17:15 AZST (UTC+5)		Summary		Stadium: Tovuz City Stadium; Attendance: 300; Referee: Elvin Äsgärov

16 May 2010 32	Olimpik-Shuvalan	2 - 0	FK Mughan	Baku
17:15 AZST (UTC+5)	Khalilov 5'; Svanidze 73' (o.g.)	Summary		Stadium: Shafa Stadium; Attendance: 400; Referee: Jeyhun Haşımov

==== Table ====
Pos	Team	Pld	W	D	L	GF	GA	GD	Pts	Relegation
7	Olimpik-Shuvalan	20	10	6	4	27	15	+12	36	
8	Simurq	20	8	7	5	21	21	0	31	
9	Turan	20	7	8	5	27	22	+5	29	
10	Mughan	20	7	6	7	17	16	+1	27	
11	Standard (R)	20	7	4	9	26	23	+3	25	Relegation to Azerbaijan First Division

Source: Soccerway.com
Rules for classification: 1) points; 2) goal difference; 3) number of goals scored.
(R) Relegated

=== Azerbaijan Cup ===
4 November 2009 Last 16 1st Leg	Olimpik-Shuvalan	2 - 0	Gabala	Baku
14:00 AZT (UTC+4)	Doroș 74', 76'	Summary; Summary		Stadium: Shafa Stadium; Referee: Azad Mutallimov

11 November 2009 Last 16 2nd Leg	Gabala	1 - 0 (1 - 2 agg.)	Olimpik-Shuvalan	Qabala
14:00 AZT (UTC+4)	Kerimov 90'	Summary; Summary		Stadium: Gabala City Stadium

7 March 2010 Quarterfinal 1st leg	Simurq	0 - 0	Olimpik-Shuvalan	Zaqatala
15:00 AZT (UTC+4)		Summary; Summary		Stadium: Zaqatala City Stadium; Attendance: 400; Referee: Elnur Muradov

16 March 2010 Quarterfinal 2nd leg	Olimpik-Shuvalan	0 - 0 (0 - 0 agg.) (4 – 2 p)	Simurq	Baku
15:00 AZT (UTC+4)		Summary; Summary		Stadium: Shafa Stadium; Attendance: 850; Referee: Azad Mutallimov

27 April 2010 Semi-Final 1st Leg	Olimpik-Shuvalan	1 - 1	Khazar Lankaran	Baku
16:00 AZST (UTC+5)	Gurbanov 73'	Summary	Calincov 23'	Stadium: Shafa Stadium; Attendance: 1,500; Referee: Fariz Yusifov

5 May 2010 Semi-Final 2nd Leg	Khazar Lankaran	2 - 1 (3 - 2 agg.)	Olimpik-Shuvalan	Lankaran
18:00 AZST (UTC+5)	Lalín 6'; Mario Sergio 81'	Summary	Bunjevčević 77'	Stadium: Lankaran City Stadium; Attendance: 10,000; Referee: Elnur Muradov

== Squad statistics ==
=== Appearances and goals ===
No.	Pos	Nat	Player	Total		Premier League		Azerbaijan Cup	
No.	Pos	Nat	Player	Apps	Goals	Apps	Goals	Apps	Goals
1	GK	(Azerbaijan) AZE	Elshan Poladov	22	0	21+1	0	0	0
2	DF	(Moldova) MDA	Serghei Laşcencov	25	0	25	0	0	0
3	DF	(Azerbaijan) AZE	Nduka Usim	29	0	29	0	0	0
4	MF	(Georgia (country)) GEO	Roman Goginashvili	10	2	9+1	2	0	0
5	MF	(Brazil) BRA	Diano	28	3	28	3	0	0
7	DF	(Azerbaijan) AZE	Agil Nabiyev	24	0	24	0	0	0
9	FW	(Moldova) MDA	Anatolie Doroș	28	12	27+1	12	0	0
10	MF	(Russia) RUS	Nugzar Kvirtiya	30	2	25+5	2	0	0
11	DF	(Serbia) SRB	Dragan Mandic	28	1	28	1	0	0
12	GK	(Azerbaijan) AZE	Jahangir Hasanzade	12	0	11+1	0	0	0
13	FW	(Azerbaijan) AZE	Nariman Äzimov	8	0	1+7	0	0	0
15	MF	(Azerbaijan) AZE	Huseyn Akhundov	13	0	6+7	0	0	0
17	MF	(Azerbaijan) AZE	Tarlan Khalilov	27	2	25+2	2	0	0
18	MF	(Azerbaijan) AZE	Ilgar Gurbanov	23	2	17+6	2	0	0
23	FW	(Nigeria) NGR	Victor Igbekoyi	20	3	17+3	3	0	0
	DF	(Serbia) SRB	Mirko Bunjevčević	13	1	13	1	0	0
	MF	(Azerbaijan) AZE	Orkhan Safiyaroglu	3	0	0+3	0	0	0
	FW	(Azerbaijan) AZE	Samir Abdulov	10	0	7+3	0	0	0
	FW	(Azerbaijan) AZE	Vusal Garaev	6	0	4+2	0	0	0
	FW	(Brazil) BRA	Junivan	12	0	3+9	0	0	0
	FW	(Brazil) BRA	Ismael Gaúcho	11	3	6+5	3	0	0
Players who appeared for AZAL and left during the season:
6	MF	(Russia) RUS	Ramaz Dzhabnidze	3	0	0+3	0	0	0
6	MF	(Guinea) GUI	Abdoul Kader Camara	14	0	12+2	0	0	0
8	DF	(Azerbaijan) AZE	Fizuli Mammedov	5	0	1+4	0	0	0
14	DF	(Azerbaijan) AZE	Vasif Hagverdiyev	7	0	1+6	0	0	0
19	MF	(Belarus) BLR	Artsyom Vaskow	12	0	5+7	0	0	0
22	MF	(France) FRA	Ender Günlü	8	0	2+6	0	0	0
24	FW	(Latvia) LAT	Nikolajs Kozačuks	10	0	5+5	0	0	0
	FW	(Azerbaijan) AZE	Ramin Nasibov	1	0	0+1	0	0	0

=== Goal scorers ===
Place	Position	Nation	Number	Name	Premier League	Azerbaijan Cup	Total
1	FW	(Moldova)	9	Anatolie Doroș	12	2	14
2	MF	(Brazil)	5	Diano	3	0	3
2	MF	(Nigeria)	23	Victor Igbekoyi	3	0	3
2	FW	(Brazil)		Ismael Gaúcho	3	0	3
2	MF	(Azerbaijan)	18	Ilgar Gurbanov	2	1	3
6	MF	(Georgia (country))	4	Roman Goginashvili	2	0	2
6	MF	(Azerbaijan)	17	Tarlan Khalilov	2	0	2
6	MF	(Russia)	10	Nugzar Kvirtiya	2	0	2
6				Own goal	2	0	2
6	DF	(Serbia)		Mirko Bunjevcevic	1	1	2
11	DF	(Serbia)	11	Dragan Mandic	1	0	1
				TOTALS	33	4	37

Number	Nation	Position	Name	Premier League		Azerbaijan Cup		Total	
Number	Nation	Position	Name	Yellow card	Red card	Yellow card	Red card	Yellow card	Red card
1	(Azerbaijan)	GK	Elshan Poladov	1	0	0	0	1	0
2	(Moldova)	DF	Serghei Laşcencov	10	1	0	0	10	1
3	(Azerbaijan)	DF	Nduka Usim	7	0	0	0	7	0
4	(Georgia (country))	MF	Roman Goginashvili	4	0	0	0	4	0
5	(Brazil)	MF	Diano	4	0	0	0	4	0
6	(Guinea)	MF	Abdoul Kader Camara	8	1	0	0	8	1
7	(Azerbaijan)	DF	Agil Nabiyev	9	0	0	0	9	0
8	(Azerbaijan)	DF	Fizuli Mammedov	2	0	0	0	2	0
9	(Moldova)	FW	Anatolie Doroș	4	0	0	0	4	0
10	(Russia)	MF	Nugzar Kvirtiya	5	0	0	0	5	0
11	(Serbia)	DF	Dragan Mandic	5	0	0	0	5	0
12	(Azerbaijan)	GK	Jahangir Hasanzade	2	1	0	0	2	1
13	(Azerbaijan)	FW	Nariman Äzimov	1	0	0	0	1	0
14	(Azerbaijan)	DF	Vasif Hagverdiyev	2	1	0	0	2	1
15	(Azerbaijan)	MF	Huseyn Akhundov	2	0	0	0	2	0
17	(Azerbaijan)	MF	Tarlan Khalilov	6	0	0	0	6	0
18	(Azerbaijan)	MF	Ilgar Gurbanov	4	0	0	0	4	0
19	(Belarus)	MF	Artsyom Vaskow	2	0	0	0	2	0
20	(Azerbaijan)	FW	Ramin Nasibov	1	0	0	0	1	0
23	(Nigeria)	FW	Victor Igbekoyi	5	0	0	0	5	0
24	(Latvia)	FW	Nikolajs Kozačuks	2	0	0	0	2	0
	(Azerbaijan)	FW	Samir Abdulov	1	0	0	0	1	0
	(Brazil)	FW	Ismael Gaúcho	2	1	0	0	2	1
	(Brazil)	FW	Junivan	2	0	0	0	2	0
			TOTALS	90	5	0	0	0	0
