= 2008–09 AZAL PFC season =

Olimpik Baku
2008–09 season
- Chairman: Rasul Rasulov
- Manager: Asgar Abdullayev
- Stadium: Shafa Stadium
- Premier League: 6th
- Azerbaijan Cup: Quarter-finals vs Gabala
- UEFA Cup: 1st Qualifying Round vs Vojvodina
- Top goalscorer: League: Leandro Gomes (10); All: Leandro Gomes (10)
Home colours	Away colours

The Olimpik Baku 2008–09 season was Olimpik Baku's fourth Azerbaijan Premier League season and their third season with Asgar Abdullayev as manager. They participated in the 2008–09 Azerbaijan Premier League as well as the 2008–09 Azerbaijan Cup, finishing the league in 6th place, being knocked out of the Cup at the Quarterfinal stage by Gabala and going out of the UEFA Cup at the 1st Qualifying Round stage after defeat to Vojvodina.

== Squad ==
Note: Flags indicate national team as defined under FIFA eligibility rules; some limited exceptions apply. Players may hold more than one non-FIFA nationality.

No.	Pos.	Nation	Player
1	GK	(Azerbaijan) AZE	Zabit Safarov
2	DF	(Moldova) MDA	Serghei Laşcencov
3	DF	(Azerbaijan) AZE	Nduka Usim
4	DF	(Azerbaijan) AZE	Tarlan Ahmadov
5	MF	(Lithuania) LTU	Marijan Choruzi
6	DF	(Brazil) BRA	Diano
7	DF	(Azerbaijan) AZE	Agil Nabiyev
8	FW	(Brazil) BRA	Junivan
9	FW	(Azerbaijan) AZE	Samir Musayev
10	MF	(Tunisia) TUN	Bechir Mogaadi
11	MF	(Serbia) SRB	Dragan Mandic
13	MF	(Azerbaijan) AZE	Nariman Azimov
14	MF	(Georgia (country)) GEO	Aleksandr Gogoberishvili

No.	Pos.	Nation	Player
17	MF	(Azerbaijan) AZE	Nizami Hajiyev
19	MF	(Georgia (country)) GEO	Revaz Getsadze
25	DF	(Azerbaijan) AZE	Mahir Shukurov
31	MF	(Azerbaijan) AZE	Samir Guliyev
35	FW	(Georgia (country)) GEO	Roman Akhalkatsi
44	GK	(Azerbaijan) AZE	Rauf Mehdiyev
55	FW	(Azerbaijan) AZE	Leandro Gomes
77	DF	(Azerbaijan) AZE	Ramin Guliyev
96	GK	(Azerbaijan) AZE	Elshan Poladov
—	MF	(Azerbaijan) AZE	Rasif Safiyarov
—	MF	(Azerbaijan) AZE	Shahin Gurbanov
—	GK	(Azerbaijan) AZE	Jahangir Hasanzade

== Transfers ==
=== Summer ===
In: Note: Flags indicate national team as defined under FIFA eligibility rules; some limited exceptions apply. Players may hold more than one non-FIFA nationality.

No.	Pos.	Nation	Player
2	DF	(Moldova) MDA	Serghei Laşcencov (from (Ukraine) Karpaty Lviv)
5	MF	(Lithuania) LTU	Marijan Choruzi (from (Latvia) Ventspils)
6	DF	(Brazil) BRA	Diano (from (Bulgaria) Belasitsa Petrich)
8	FW	(Brazil) BRA	Junivan (from (Azerbaijan) Turan Tovuz)
8	MF	(Azerbaijan) AZE	Arif Dashdemirov (from (Azerbaijan) Masallı)
10	MF	(Tunisia) TUN	Bechir Mogaadi (from (Tunisia) ES Hammam-Sousse)
17	DF	(Azerbaijan) AZE	Ramin Guliyev (from (Azerbaijan) Neftchi Baku)
19	MF	(Georgia (country)) GEO	Revaz Getsadze (from (Georgia (country)) Metalurgi Rustavi)
20	MF	(Azerbaijan) AZE	Nizami Hajiyev (from (Azerbaijan) Inter Baku)
25	DF	(Azerbaijan) AZE	Mahir Shukurov (from (Azerbaijan) Khazar Lankaran)
31	FW	(Georgia (country)) GEO	Mikheil Khutsishvili (from (Georgia (country)) Dinamo Tbilisi)
35	MF	(Georgia (country)) GEO	Roman Akhalkatsi (from (Azerbaijan) Karvan)
55	FW	(Azerbaijan) AZE	Leandro Gomes (from (Azerbaijan) Baku)

Out: Note: Flags indicate national team as defined under FIFA eligibility rules; some limited exceptions apply. Players may hold more than one non-FIFA nationality.

No.	Pos.	Nation	Player
2	DF	(Azerbaijan) AZE	Ilyas Gurbanov (to (Azerbaijan) Mughan)
8	MF	(Azerbaijan) AZE	Arif Dashdemirov (to (Azerbaijan) Standard Sumgayit)
10	MF	(Azerbaijan) AZE	Fabio Luis Ramim (to (Azerbaijan) Baku)
17	MF	(Brazil) BRA	Alessandro De Paula
21	FW	(Azerbaijan) AZE	Javid Huseynov (to (Azerbaijan) Inter Baku)
22	FW	(Guinea) GUI	Pathé Bangoura (to (Azerbaijan) Mughan)
—	DF	(North Macedonia) MKD	Bilal Velija (to (Albania) Besa Kavajë)
—	MF	(North Macedonia) MKD	Ilami Halimi (to (Greece) Kastoria)
—	FW	(Azerbaijan) AZE	Narvik Sirkhayev (Retired)

=== Winter ===
In: Note: Flags indicate national team as defined under FIFA eligibility rules; some limited exceptions apply. Players may hold more than one non-FIFA nationality.

No.	Pos.	Nation	Player
14	MF	(Georgia (country)) GEO	Aleksandr Gogoberishvili (from (Azerbaijan) Qarabağ)
—	GK	(Azerbaijan) AZE	Jahangir Hasanzade (from (Azerbaijan) Gabala)

Out: Note: Flags indicate national team as defined under FIFA eligibility rules; some limited exceptions apply. Players may hold more than one non-FIFA nationality.

No.	Pos.	Nation	Player
31	FW	(Georgia (country)) GEO	Mikheil Khutsishvili (to (Serbia) FK Vojvodina)
77	MF	(Azerbaijan) AZE	Yashar Abuzerov (to (Azerbaijan) Gabala)

== Competitions ==
=== Azerbaijan Premier League ===
==== Results ====
10 August 2008 1	Olimpik Baku	1 – 1	Inter Baku	Baku
19:00 AZST (UTC+5)	Gomes 86'	Summary	E.Mammadov 24'	Stadium: Shafa Stadium

16 August 2008 2	Qarabağ	1 – 1	Olimpik Baku	Baku
18:00 AZST (UTC+5)	Ferhatovic 90'	Summary	Junivan 22'	Stadium: Tofiq Bahramov Stadium^{2}

24 August 2008 3	Olimpik Baku	1 – 0	FK Karvan	Baku
21:00 AZST (UTC+5)	Gomes 30'	Summary		Stadium: Shafa Stadium

31 August 2008 4	Bakili Baku	1 – 2	Olimpik Baku	Baku
18:00 AZST (UTC+5)	A.Abbasov 90'	Summary	Musayev 24'; Shukurov 86'	Stadium: Shafa Stadium

20 September 2008 5	Olimpik Baku	0 – 1	Khazar Lankaran	Baku
18:00 AZST (UTC+5)		Summary	Tsvetkov 34'	Stadium: Shafa Stadium

27 September 2008 6	Olimpik Baku	0 – 0	Standard Baku	Baku
16:30 AZST (UTC+5)		Summary		Stadium: Shafa Stadium

4 October 2008 7	Baku	3 – 1	Olimpik Baku	Baku
17:15 AZST (UTC+5)	Mujiri 41' (pen.); Tijani 67'; Fabio 87'	Summary	Lascencov 14' (pen.)	Stadium: Tofig Bakhramov Stadium

18 October 2008 8	Olimpik Baku	1 – 0	Gabala	Baku
16:00 AZST (UTC+5)	Getsadze 3'	Summary		Stadium: Shafa Stadium

26 October 2008 9	Simurq	1 – 1	Olimpik Baku	Zaqatala
18:00 AZST (UTC+5)	Nasibov 44'	Summary	Getsadze 86'	Stadium: Zaqatala City Stadium

8 November 2008 10	Olimpik Baku	3 – 0	Turan Tovuz	Baku
15:00 AZST (UTC+5)	Lascencov 28' (pen.); Junivan 59'; Mogaadi 85'	Summary		Stadium: Shafa Stadium

16 November 2008 11	FK Mughan^{2}	0 – 1	Olimpik Baku	Salyan
14:00 AZST (UTC+5)		Summary	Junivan 73'	Stadium: Salyany Olympic Sport Complex Stadium

22 November 2008 12	Olimpik Baku	3 – 1	MOIK Baku	Baku
15:00 AZST (UTC+5)	Diano 23'; Akhalkatsi 75'; Mogaadi 89' (pen.)	Summary	Lascencov 43' (o.g.)	Stadium: Shafa Stadium

30 November 2008 13	Neftchi Baku	1 – 2	Olimpik Baku	Baku
14:30 AZT (UTC+4)	Bakhshiev 6'	Summary	Gomes 13'; Getsadze 90'	Stadium: Tofig Bakhramov Stadium

15 February 2009 14	Inter Baku	1 – 0	Olimpik Baku	Baku
18:00 AZT (UTC+4)	Accioly 62'	Summary		Stadium: Shafa Stadium

21 February 2009 15	Olimpik Baku	0 – 1	Qarabağ	Baku
14:00 AZT (UTC+4)		Summary	Ramazanov 24'	Stadium: Shafa Stadion

28 February 2009 16	Karvan	0 – 1	Olimpik Baku	Yevlakh
14:00 AZST (UTC+5)		Summary	Gomes 23'	Stadium: Yevlakh City Stadium

7 March 2009 17	Olimpik Baku	4 – 0	Bakili Baku	Baku
15:00 AZT (UTC+4)	Gomes 8', 10', 87'; Junivan 58'	Summary		Stadium: Shafa Stadion

14 March 2009 18	Khazar Lankaran	0 – 0	Olimpik Baku	Lankaran
16:00 AZT (UTC+4)		Summary		Stadium: Lankaran City Stadium

22 March 2009 19	Standard Baku	0 – 0	Olimpik Baku	Baku
18:00 AZST (UTC+4)		Summary		Stadium: Shafa Stadium

5 April 2009 20	Olimpik Baku	2 – 1	Baku	Baku
16:00 AZST (UTC+5)	Junivan 51'; Gomes 74'	Summary	Tijani 12'	Stadium: Shafa Stadion

12 April 2009 21	Gabala	1 – 1	Olimpik Baku	Qabala
16:00 AZST (UTC+5)	Hatami 50'	Summary	Gomes 86'	Stadium: Gabala City Stadium

18 April 2009 22	Olimpik Baku	0 – 2	Simurq	Baku
16:00 AZST (UTC+5)		Summary	Bolkvadze 45'; Mazyar 69'	Stadium: Shafa Stadion

26 April 2009 23	Turan Tovuz	1 – 0	Olimpik Baku	Tovuz
16:00 AZST (UTC+5)	Igbekoi 34'	Summary		Stadium: Tovuz City Stadium

3 May 2009 24	Olimpik Baku	1 – 0	FK Mughan^{2}	Baku
17:00 AZST (UTC+5)	Junivan 12'	Summary		Stadium: Shafa Stadion

11 May 2009 25	MOIK Baku	1 – 6	Olimpik Baku	Baku
17:00 AZST (UTC+5)	Akhundov 80'	Summary	N.Azimov 30', 40', 56'; Gomes 50'; Hajiyev 73'; Gogoberishvili 86'	Stadium: Shafa Stadium

17 May 2009 26	Olimpik Baku	0 – 0	Neftchi Baku	Baku
18:00 AZST (UTC+5)		Summary		Stadium: Shafa Stadion

==== Table ====
Pos	Team	Pld	W	D	L	GF	GA	GD	Pts	Qualification or relegation
4	Khazar Lankaran	26	15	5	6	49	21	+28	50	
5	Qarabağ	26	14	7	5	35	22	+13	49	Qualification for Europa League second qualifying round (Note: Karabakh won the 2008–09 Azerbaijan Cup and therefore qualified for the second qualifying round of the UEFA Europa League.)
6	Olimpik Baku	26	12	8	6	32	18	+14	44	
7	Standard Baku	26	12	3	11	30	31	−1	39	
8	Neftçi Baku	26	9	9	8	30	21	+9	36	

Source: Soccerway.com
Rules for classification: 1) points; 2) goal difference; 3) number of goals scored.

=== Azerbaijan Cup ===
30 October 2008 Last 16 1st Leg	Olimpik Baku	1 – 0	Karvan	Baku
20:00 AZT (UTC+4)	Shukurov 52'	Summary		Stadium: Shafa Stadion

5 November 2008 Last 16 2nd Leg	Karvan	0 – 1 (0 – 2 agg.)	Olimpik Baku	Yevlakh
14:00 AZT (UTC+4)		Summary	Diano 78'	Stadium: Yevlakh Stadium

25 February 2009 Quarterfinals 1st Leg	Gabala	1 - 1	Olimpik Baku	Qabala
14:00 AZT (UTC+4)	Kerimov 67' (pen.)	Summary	Mogaadi 35' (pen.)	Stadium: Gabala City Stadium

11 March 2009 Quarterfinals 2nd Leg	Olimpik Baku	0 - 1 (1 - 2 agg.)	Gabala	Baku
15:00 AZT (UTC+4)		Summary	Hatami 66'	Stadium: AZAL Stadium

=== UEFA Cup ===
==== Qualifying rounds ====
17 July 2008 1st qualifying round 1st leg	Vojvodina (Serbia)	1 – 0	(Azerbaijan) Olimpik Baku	Novi Sad, Serbia
22:00 AZST (UTC+5)	Đurić 59'	Report		Stadium: Karađorđe Stadium, Referee: Mark Whitby (Wales)

31 July 2008 1st qualifying round 2nd leg	Olimpik Baku (Azerbaijan)	1 – 1 (1 – 2 agg.)	(Serbia) Vojvodina	Baku, Azerbaijan
20:00 AZST (UTC+5)	Akhalkatsi 49'	Report	Đurić 86'	Stadium: Tofik Bakhramov Stadium; Referee: Sandor Szabo (Hungary)

== Squad statistics ==
=== Appearances and goals ===
No.	Pos	Nat	Player	Total		Premier League		Azerbaijan Cup		UEFA Cup	
No.	Pos	Nat	Player	Apps	Goals	Apps	Goals	Apps	Goals	Apps	Goals
2	DF	(Moldova) MDA	Serghei Laşcencov	21	2	19	2	0	0	2	0
3	DF	(Azerbaijan) AZE	Usim Nduka	26	0	24	0	0	0	2	0
4	DF	(Azerbaijan) AZE	Tarlan Ahmadov	25	0	23	0	0	0	2	0
5	MF	(Lithuania) LTU	Marijan Choruzi	19	0	17	0	0	0	2	0
6	DF	(Brazil) BRA	Diano	23	1	21	1	0	0	1+1	0
7	DF	(Azerbaijan) AZE	Agil Nabiyev	17	0	15	0	0	0	1+1	0
8	FW	(Brazil) BRA	Junivan	22	6	22	6	0	0	0	0
9	FW	(Azerbaijan) AZE	Samir Musayev	17	1	15	1	0	0	0+2	0
10	MF	(Tunisia) TUN	Bechir Mogaadi	20	2	18	2	0	0	2	0
11	MF	(Serbia) SRB	Dragan Mandic	18	0	18	0	0	0	0	0
13	MF	(Azerbaijan) AZE	Nariman Azimov	3	3	3	3	0	0	0	0
14	MF	(Georgia (country)) GEO	Aleksandr Gogoberishvili	13	1	13	1	0	0	0	0
17	MF	(Azerbaijan) AZE	Nizami Hajiyev	18	1	18	1	0	0	0	0
19	MF	(Georgia (country)) GEO	Revaz Getsadze	13	3	13	3	0	0	0	0
25	DF	(Azerbaijan) AZE	Mahir Shukurov	18	1	18	1	0	0	0	0
25	MF	(Azerbaijan) AZE	Vəliyev Arzuman	2	0	2	0	0	0	0	0
31	MF	(Azerbaijan) AZE	Samir Guliyev	1	0	1	0	0	0	0	0
35	FW	(Georgia (country)) GEO	Roman Akhalkatsi	23	2	21	1	0	0	2	1
44	GK	(Azerbaijan) AZE	Rauf Mehdiyev	21	0	19	0	0	0	2	0
55	GK	(Azerbaijan) AZE	Leandro Gomes	25	10	24	10	0	0	1	0
77	DF	(Azerbaijan) AZE	Ramin Guliyev	19	0	17	0	0	0	2	0
96	GK	(Azerbaijan) AZE	Elshan Poladov	7	0	7	0	0	0	0	0
Players who appeared for Olimpik Baku and left during the season:
8	DF	(Azerbaijan) AZE	Arif Dashdemirov	2	0	0	0	0	0	0+2	0
31	FW	(Georgia (country)) GEO	Mikheil Khutsishvili	12	0	10	0	0	0	2	0
77	MF	(Azerbaijan) AZE	Yashar Abuzerov	5	0	4	0	0	0	1	0

=== Goal scorers ===
Place	Position	Nation	Number	Name	Premier League	Azerbaijan Cup	UEFA Cup	Total
1	FW	(Azerbaijan)	55	Leandro Gomes	10	0	0	10
2	FW	(Brazil)	8	Junivan	6	0	0	6
3	MF	(Georgia (country))	19	Revaz Getsadze	3	0	0	3
3	MF	(Azerbaijan)	13	Nariman Äzimov	3	0	0	3
3	MF	(Tunisia)	10	Bechir Mogaadi	2	1	0	3
6	DF	(Moldova)	2	Serghei Laşcencov	2	0	0	2
6	DF	(Brazil)	6	Diano	1	1	0	2
6	DF	(Azerbaijan)	25	Mahir Shukurov	1	1	0	2
6	FW	(Georgia (country))	35	Roman Akhalkatsi	1	0	1	2
10	MF	(Azerbaijan)	20	Nizami Hajiyev	1	0	0	1
10	FW	(Azerbaijan)	9	Samir Musayev	1	0	0	1
10	MF	(Georgia (country))	14	Aleksandr Gogoberishvili	1	0	0	1
				TOTALS	32	3	1	36

=== Disciplinary record ===
Number	Nation	Position	Name	Premier League		Azerbaijan Cup		UEFA Cup		Total	
Number	Nation	Position	Name	Booked	Sent off (straight red)	Booked	Sent off (straight red)	Booked	Sent off (straight red)	Booked	Sent off (straight red)
7	(Azerbaijan)	DF	Agil Nabiyev	0	0	0	0	1	0	1	0
10	(Tunisia)	MF	Bechir Mogaadi	0	0	0	0	1	0	1	0
17	(Azerbaijan)	DF	Ramin Guliyev	0	0	0	0	1	0	1	0
77	(Azerbaijan)	MF	Yashar Abuzerov	0	0	0	0	1	0	1	0
			TOTALS	0	0	0	0	4	0	4	0

== Notes ==
- Qarabağ have played their home games at the Tofiq Bahramov Stadium since 1993 due to the ongoing situation in Quzanlı.
- On 31 October 2008, FK NBC Salyan changed their name to FK Mughan.
