= 2010–11 AZAL PFC season =

AZAL
2010–11 season
- Chairman: Zaur Akhundov
- Manager: Nazim Suleymanov
- Stadium: Shafa Stadium
- Premier League: 4th
- Azerbaijan Cup: Semi-finals vs Inter Baku
- Top goalscorer: League: Gvidas Juska (9); All: Gvidas Juska (9)
- Highest home attendance: 4,000 vs Khazar Lankaran; 13 March 2011
- Lowest home attendance: 300 vs Turan Tovuz; 14 August 2010; Simurq; 12 September 2010; Inter Baku; 16 October 2010
- Average home league attendance: 1,311
Home colours	Away colours

The AZAL 2010–11 season was AZAL's sixth Azerbaijan Premier League season. AZAL finished the season in 8th place and were knocked out of the 2010–11 Azerbaijan Cup by Inter Baku in the semi-finals. It was their first full season under the management of Nazim Suleymanov. The team's kit was supplied by Umbro and their sponsor was Silk Way.

== Squad ==
Note: Flags indicate national team as defined under FIFA eligibility rules; some limited exceptions apply. Players may hold more than one non-FIFA nationality.

No.	Pos.	Nation	Player
2	DF	MKD	Robert Petrov
3	DF	AZE	Nduka Usim (2nd vice-captain)
4	DF	AZE	Namig Abdullazade
5	DF	AZE	Agil Nabiyev (captain)
6	DF	LAT	Ritus Krjauklis
7	MF	AZE	Tarlan Khalilov
8	FW	ALB	Eleandro Pema
9	MF	NGR	Victor Igbekoyi
10	MF	RUS	Nugzar Kvirtiya
11	MF	MAR	Zouhir Benouahi
12	GK	AZE	Jahangir Hasanzade (1st vice-captain)
13	MF	SRB	Dragan Mandić

No.	Pos.	Nation	Player
14	DF	AZE	Elvin Aliyev
15	FW	LTU	Gvidas Juska
16	MF	KOS	Mensur Limani
17	MF	AZE	Vusal Garaev
18	MF	AZE	Orkhan Safiyaroglu
19	MF	AZE	Huseyn Akhundov
20	FW	BLR	Gennadi Bliznyuk
21	MF	SRB	Mirko Bunjevčević
22	MF	AZE	Anar Hasanov
23	MF	NGR	Pius Ikedia
24	FW	BUL	Enyo Krastovchev
96	GK	AZE	Elshan Poladov

== Transfers ==
=== Summer ===
In: Note: Flags indicate national team as defined under FIFA eligibility rules; some limited exceptions apply. Players may hold more than one non-FIFA nationality.

No.	Pos.	Nation	Player
2	DF	MKD	Robert Petrov (from (Bulgaria) Slavia Sofia)
6	DF	LAT	Ritus Krjauklis (from (Latvia) Ventspils)
8	FW	ALB	Eleandro Pema (from (Albania) Kastrioti Kruje)
11	MF	MAR	Zouhir Benouahi (from (Kuwait) Al-Fahaheel)
14	DF	AZE	Elvin Aliyev (loan from (Azerbaijan) FK Baku)
20	DF	LTU	Marius Kazlauskas (from (Slovakia) Dunajská Streda)
23	MF	NGR	Pius Ikedia (from (Netherlands) RBC Roosendaal)

Out: Note: Flags indicate national team as defined under FIFA eligibility rules; some limited exceptions apply. Players may hold more than one non-FIFA nationality.

No.	Pos.	Nation	Player
2	DF	MDA	Serghei Laşcencov (Banned)
5	MF	BRA	Claudiano (to (Indonesia) Sriwijaya)
—	FW	BRA	Ismael Gaúcho (to (Portugal) Juventude Sport Clube)

=== Winter ===
In: Note: Flags indicate national team as defined under FIFA eligibility rules; some limited exceptions apply. Players may hold more than one non-FIFA nationality.

No.	Pos.	Nation	Player
16	MF	KOS	Mensur Limani (from (Albania) Vllaznia Shkodër)
20	FW	BLR	Gennadi Bliznyuk (from (Belarus) Belshina Bobruisk)
24	FW	BUL	Enyo Krastovchev (from (Bulgaria) Levski Sofia)

Out: Note: Flags indicate national team as defined under FIFA eligibility rules; some limited exceptions apply. Players may hold more than one non-FIFA nationality.

No.	Pos.	Nation	Player
6	DF	NGR	Abiodun Lawal (released)
16	FW	AZE	Samir Abdulov (to (Azerbaijan) FK Ganja)
17	MF	AZE	Huseyn Akhundov (loan to (Azerbaijan) FK Mughan)
20	DF	LTU	Marius Kazlauskas (to (Lithuania) Banga Gargždai)

== Competitions ==
=== Azerbaijan Premier League ===
==== Results ====
7 August 2010 1	Baku	2 - 3	AZAL	Baku
20:00 AZST (UTC+5)	Jabá 64', 77'	Summary	Juška 43', 52'; Bunjevčević 54'	Stadium: Tofik Bakhramov Stadium; Attendance: 450; Referee: Elchin Mämmädov

14 August 2010 2	AZAL	1 - 0	Turan Tovuz	Baku
20:00 AZST (UTC+5)	Mandić 69'	Summary		Stadium: Shafa Stadium; Attendance: 300; Referee: Afgan Hamzayev

21 August 2010 3	FK Ganja	1 - 1	AZAL	Qabala
18:00 AZST (UTC+5)	Junivan 42'	Summary	Usim 69'	Stadium: Ganja City Stadium; Attendance: 5,000; Referee: Elchin Mämmädov

29 August 2010 4	AZAL	0 - 1	Khazar Lankaran	Baku
20:00 AZST (UTC+5)		Summary	Beqiri 90+2'	Stadium: Shafa Stadium; Attendance: 2,500; Referee: Rovshan Ahmadov

12 September 2010 5	AZAL	2 - 1	Simurq	Baku
18:30 AZST (UTC+5)	Juška 73' (pen.), 85'; Garaev (yellow card) 34' (yellow-red card) 75'	Summary	Rahimov 90'	Stadium: Shafa Stadium; Attendance: 300; Referee: Rahim Hasanov

19 September 2010 6	Qarabağ	0 - 0	AZAL	Baku^{1}
17:10 AZST (UTC+5)		Summary		Stadium: Tofiq Bahramov Stadium; Attendance: 300; Referee: Rovshan Ahmadov

26 September 2010 7	AZAL	2 - 0	MOIK Baku	Baku
17:00 AZST (UTC+5)	Garaev 39'; Juska 90'	Summary		Stadium: Shafa Stadium; Attendance: 400; Referee: Ramil Diniyev

1 October 2010 8	Neftchi Baku	1 - 0	AZAL	Baku
18:00 AZST (UTC+5)	Mpenza 3'	Summary		Stadium: Tofik Bakhramov Stadium; Attendance: 1,000; Referee: Afgan Hamzayev

16 October 2010 9	AZAL	5 - 0	Inter Baku	Baku
16:30 AZST (UTC+5)	Juška 69'; Igbekoyi 49', 79'; Kvirtiya 76'; Garaev 82'	Summary		Stadium: Shafa Stadium; Attendance: 300; Referee: Fariz Yusifov

23 October 2010 10	Gabala	0 - 0	AZAL	Qabala
15:00 AZST (UTC+5)		Report; Summary		Stadium: Gabala City Stadium; Attendance: 800; Referee: Jeyhun Hashimov

30 October 2010 11	AZAL	2 - 0	FK Mughan	Baku
15:00 AZST (UTC+5)	Juška 29'; Igbekoyi 85'	Summary		Stadium: Shafa Stadium; Attendance: 500; Referee: Elchin Mämmädov

6 November 2010 12	Simurq	0 - 1	AZAL	Zaqatala
14:00 AZT (UTC+4)		Summary	Benouahi 28'	Stadium: Zaqatala City Stadium; Attendance: 155; Referee: Rauf Jabbarov

12 November 2010 13	MOIK Baku	1 - 1	AZAL	Baku
14:00 AZT (UTC+4)	Gurbanov 47' (pen.); Gventsadze (red card) 60'	Summary	Ikedia 27'	Stadium: Shafa Stadium; Attendance: 100; Referee: Elvin Askerov

21 November 2010 14	AZAL	2 - 0	Qarabağ	Baku
14:00 AZT (UTC+4)	Benouahi 75', 84'	Summary		Stadium: Shafa Stadium; Attendance: 600; Referee: Elchin Mämmädov

28 November 2010 15	Turan Tovuz	1 - 2	AZAL	Tovuz
14:00 AZT (UTC+4)	Erdoğdu 58'	Summary	Benouahi 12', 53'	Stadium: Tovuz City Stadium; Attendance: 2,300; Referee: Elnur Muradov

4 December 2010 16	AZAL	0 - 0	Neftchi Baku	Baku
14:00 AZT (UTC+4)		Summary		Stadium: Shafa Stadium; Attendance: 1,500; Referee: Elchin Mämmädov

11 December 2010 17	Inter Baku	1 - 1	AZAL	Baku
16:00 AZT (UTC+4)	Zlatinov 61'	Summary	Juška 70'	Stadium: Shafa Stadium; Attendance: 2,000; Referee: Fariz Yusifov

19 December 2010 18	AZAL	2 - 2	Gabala	Baku
14:00 AZT (UTC+4)	Juška 45'; Petrov 90'	Report; Summary	Isayev 3'; Antić 19'	Stadium: Shafa Stadium; Attendance: 1,000; Referee: Rovshan Ahmadov

23 December 2010 19	FK Mughan	3 - 1	AZAL	Salyan
13:00 AZT (UTC+4)	Mammadov 27', 61'; Hodžić 70'; Mirzayev (yellow card) 43' (yellow-red card) 90+4'	Summary	Garaev 8'	Stadium: Salyan Olympic Sport Complex Stadium; Attendance: 500; Referee: Fariz Yusifov

12 February 2011 20	AZAL	0 - 0	FK Ganja	Baku
15:00 AZT (UTC+4)		Summary		Stadium: Shafa Stadium; Attendance: 500; Referee: Elnur Muradov

20 February 2011 21	Khazar Lankaran	2 - 1	AZAL	Lankaran
17:30 AZT (UTC+4)	Abdullayev 45'; Chiacu 78'	Summary	Nduka 57'	Stadium: Lankaran City Stadium; Attendance: 12,000; Referee: Fariz Yusifov

25 February 2011 22	AZAL	0 - 0	Baku	Baku
16:00 AZT (UTC+4)		Summary		Stadium: Shafa Stadium; Attendance: 500; Referee: Elchin Mämmädov

==== League table ====
Pos	Team	Pld	W	D	L	GF	GA	GD	Pts	Qualification
3	Qarabağ	22	13	3	6	30	14	+16	42	Qualification for championship group
4	Inter Baku	22	12	4	6	24	16	+8	40	Qualification for championship group
5	AZAL	22	9	9	4	27	16	+11	36	Qualification for championship group
6	Baku	22	9	6	7	28	21	+7	33	Qualification for championship group
7	Gabala	22	8	7	7	19	14	+5	31	Qualification for relegation group

Source: Soccerway.com
Rules for classification: 1) points; 2) goal difference; 3) number of goals scored.

=== Azerbaijan Premier League Championship Group ===
==== Results ====
13 March 2011 23	AZAL	1 - 0	Khazar Lankaran	Baku
14:00 AZT (UTC+4)	Krastovchev 76'	Summary		Stadium: AZAL Stadium; Attendance: 4,000; Referee: Rovshan Ahmadov

18 March 2011 24	Qarabağ	1 - 0	AZAL	Baku
14:00 AZT (UTC+4)	Adamia 31' (pen.)	Summary		Stadium: Tofiq Bahramov Stadium^{1} Attendance: 550; Referee: Anar Salmanov

3 April 2011 25	AZAL	1 - 0	Inter Baku	Baku
16:00 AZST (UTC+5)	Kvirtiya 45'	Summary		Stadium: AZAL Arena; Attendance: 800; Referee: Fariz Yusifov

10 April 2011 26	AZAL	1 - 0	Baku	Baku
18:00 AZST (UTC+5)	Bliznyuk 45+2'	Summary		Stadium: AZAL Stadium; Attendance: 2,000; Referee: Elnur Muradov

17 April 2011 27	Neftchi Baku	2 - 1	AZAL	Baku
16:00 AZST (UTC+5)	Abdullayev 49'; Mpenza 51'	Summary	Benouahi 6'	Stadium: Tofik Bakhramov Stadium; Attendance: 1,500; Referee: Ramil Diniyev

23 April 2011 28	Khazar Lankaran	3 - 0	AZAL	Lankaran
18:30 AZST (UTC+5)	Opara 58'; Parks 76'; Abdullayev 79'	Summary		Stadium: Lankaran City Stadium; Attendance: 10,500; Referee: Vusal Aliyev

1 May 2011 29	AZAL	1 - 3	Neftchi Baku	Baku
20:00 AZST (UTC+5)	Petrov (yellow card) 75' (yellow-red card) 87'; Juska 90+1'	Summary	Huseynov 11'; Krjauklis 17' (o.g.); Rodriguinho 90'	Stadium: AZAL Arena; Attendance: 3,000; Referee: Rovshan Ahmadov

7 May 2011 30	Baku	2 - 1	AZAL	Baku
15:00 AZST (UTC+5)	Šolić 20'; Sofroni 79'	Summary	Usim 66'	Stadium: Tofik Bakhramov Stadium; Attendance: 100; Referee: Rahim Hasanov

13 May 2011 31	Inter Baku	0 - 0	AZAL	Baku
19:00 AZST (UTC+5)		Summary		Stadium: Shafa Stadium; Attendance: 700; Referee: Ramil Diniyev

18 May 2011 32	AZAL	3 - 1	Qarabağ	Baku
20:00 AZST (UTC+5)	Limani 41'; Bunjevčević 43'; Krastovchev 88'	Summary	Adamia 12'	Stadium: Tofig Bahramov Stadium; Attendance: 2,000; Referee: Fariz Yusifov

==== Table ====
Pos	Team	Pld	W	D	L	GF	GA	GD	Pts	Qualification
1	Neftçi Baku (C)	32	19	10	3	53	17	+36	67	Qualification for Champions League second qualifying round
2	Khazar Lankaran	32	16	12	4	38	18	+20	60	Qualification for Europa League second qualifying round (Note: Khazar Lankaran won the 2010–11 Azerbaijan Cup and therefore qualified for the second qualifying round of the 2011–12 UEFA Europa League.)
3	Qarabağ	32	17	7	8	41	22	+19	58	Qualification for Europa League first qualifying round
4	AZAL	32	13	10	9	36	28	+8	49	Qualification for Europa League first qualifying round
5	Inter Baku	32	13	10	9	29	24	+5	49	
6	Baku	32	10	10	12	33	32	+1	40	

Source: Soccerway.com
Rules for classification: 1) points; 2) goal difference; 3) number of goals scored.
(C) Champions

=== Azerbaijan Cup ===
8 December 2010 First Round	Ravan Baku	1 - 2	AZAL	Baku
13:00 AZT (UTC+4)	R.Mammadov 90+2'	Summary	Pema 30'; Nabiyev 63'	Stadium: Bayil Stadium; Attendance: 200; Referee: Jeyhun Hashimov

2 March 2011 Quarterfinal 1st Leg	AZAL	2 - 0	Turan Tovuz	Baku
16:00 AZT (UTC+4)	Juska 39'; Kvirtiya 43'	Summary		Stadium: Shafa Stadium; Attendance: 600; Referee: Ramil Diniyev

9 March 2011 Quarterfinal 2nd Leg	Turan Tovuz	1 - 1 (3 - 1 agg.)	AZAL	Tovuz
14:00 AZT (UTC+4)	Kondev 76'	Summary	Pema 63'	Stadium: Tovuz City Stadium; Attendance: 1,500; Referee: Fariz Yusifov

27 April 2011 Semi Final 1st Leg	Inter Baku	0 - 0	AZAL	Baku
18:00 AZST (UTC+5)		Summary		Stadium: Shafa Stadium; Attendance: 600; Referee: Elchin Mämmädov

4 May 2011 Semi Final 2nd Leg	AZAL	0 - 1 (0 - 1 agg.)	Inter Baku	Baku
18:00 AZST (UTC+5)		Summary	Odikadze 2'	Stadium: Shafa Stadium; Attendance: 2,800; Referee: Fariz Yusifov

== Squad statistics ==
=== Appearances and goals ===
No.	Pos	Nat	Player	Total		Premier League		Azerbaijan Cup	
No.	Pos	Nat	Player	Apps	Goals	Apps	Goals	Apps	Goals
2	DF	(North Macedonia) MKD	Robert Petrov	35	1	31+0	1	4+0	0
3	DF	(Azerbaijan) AZE	Nduka Usim	36	3	31+0	3	5+0	0
4	DF	(Azerbaijan) AZE	Namig Abdullazade	3	0	0+1	0	0+2	0
5	DF	(Azerbaijan) AZE	Agil Nabiyev	33	1	28+0	0	5+0	1
6	DF	(Latvia) LAT	Ritus Krjauklis	14	0	7+3	0	4+0	0
7	MF	(Azerbaijan) AZE	Tarlan Khalilov	10	0	4+5	0	0+1	0
8	FW	(Albania) ALB	Eleandro Pema	17	2	8+6	0	3+0	2
9	MF	(Nigeria) NGR	Victor Igbekoyi	33	3	29+0	3	4+0	0
10	MF	(Russia) RUS	Nugzar Kvirtiya	31	3	20+7	2	3+1	1
11	MF	(Morocco) MAR	Zouhir Benouahi	28	6	22+4	6	2+0	0
12	GK	(Azerbaijan) AZE	Jahangir Hasanzade	29	0	25+0	0	4+0	0
13	MF	(Serbia) SRB	Dragan Mandić	21	1	20+0	1	1+0	0
14	DF	(Azerbaijan) AZE	Elvin Aliyev	29	0	27+0	0	2+0	0
15	FW	(Lithuania) LTU	Gvidas Juska	35	11	24+7	10	2+2	1
16	MF	(Kosovo) KOS	Mensur Limani	12	1	7+2	1	2+1	0
17	MF	(Azerbaijan) AZE	Vusal Garaev	27	3	12+12	3	2+1	0
18	MF	(Azerbaijan) AZE	Orkhan Safiyaroglu	1	0	0+0	0	0+1	0
20	FW	(Belarus) BLR	Gennadi Bliznyuk	8	1	6+0	1	2+0	0
21	MF	(Serbia) SRB	Mirko Bunjevčević	34	2	29+2	2	2+1	0
22	MF	(Azerbaijan) AZE	Anar Hasanov	10	0	0+8	0	1+1	0
23	MF	(Nigeria) NGR	Pius Ikedia	23	1	7+14	1	2+0	0
24	FW	(Bulgaria) BUL	Enyo Krastovchev	15	2	5+6	2	3+1	0
96	GK	(Azerbaijan) AZE	Elshan Poladov	8	0	7+0	0	1+0	0
		(Azerbaijan) AZE	Javid Rahimov	2	0	0+1	0	0+1	0
Players who appeared for AZAL and left on loan during the season:
19	MF	(Azerbaijan) AZE	Huseyn Akhundov	6	0	0+5	0	0+1	0
Players who appeared for AZAL and left during the season:
6	MF	(Nigeria) NGR	Abiodun Lawal	2	0	1+1	0	0+0	0
16	FW	(Azerbaijan) AZE	Samir Abdulov	9	0	2+6	0	1+0	0

=== Goal scorers ===
Place	Position	Nation	Number	Name	Premier League	Azerbaijan Cup	Total
1	FW	(Lithuania)	15	Gvidas Juska	10	1	11
2	MF	(Morocco)	11	Zouhir Benouahi	6	0	6
3	MF	(Nigeria)	9	Victor Igbekoyi	3	0	3
3	DF	(Azerbaijan)	3	Nduka Usim	3	0	3
3	MF	(Azerbaijan)	17	Vusal Garaev	3	0	3
3	MF	(Russia)	10	Nugzar Kvirtiya	2	1	3
7	MF	(Serbia)	21	Mirko Bunjevčević	2	0	2
7	FW	(Bulgaria)	24	Enyo Krastovchev	2	0	2
7	FW	(Albania)	8	Eleandro Pema	0	2	2
10	MF	(Serbia)	13	Dragan Mandić	1	0	1
10	DF	(North Macedonia)	2	Robert Petrov	1	0	1
10	MF	(Kosovo)	16	Mensur Limani	1	0	1
10	FW	(Belarus)	20	Gennadi Bliznyuk	1	0	1
10	MF	(Nigeria)	23	Pius Ikedia	1	0	1
10	DF	(Azerbaijan)	5	Agil Nabiyev	0	1	1
				TOTALS	36	5	41

=== Disciplinary record ===
Number	Nation	Position	Name	Premier League		Azerbaijan Cup		Total	
Number	Nation	Position	Name	Yellow card	Red card	Yellow card	Red card	Yellow card	Red card
2	(North Macedonia)	DF	Robert Petrov	4	1	1	0	1	0
3	(Azerbaijan)	DF	Nduka Usim	5	0	0	0	5	0
5	(Azerbaijan)	DF	Agil Nabiyev	4	0	0	0	4	0
9	(Nigeria)	MF	Victor Igbekoyi	8	0	1	0	9	0
10	(Russia)	MF	Nugzar Kvirtiya	3	0	1	0	4	0
11	(Morocco)	MF	Zouhir Benouahi	9	0	1	0	10	0
12	(Azerbaijan)	GK	Jahangir Hasanzade	3	0	1	0	4	0
13	(Serbia)	MF	Dragan Mandić	3	0	0	0	3	0
14	(Azerbaijan)	DF	Elvin Aliyev	10	0	0	0	10	0
15	(Lithuania)	FW	Gvidas Juska	1	0	0	0	1	0
16	(Azerbaijan)	MF	Samir Abdulov	0	0	1	0	1	0
17	(Azerbaijan)	MF	Vusal Garaev	4	1	1	0	5	1
21	(Serbia)	MF	Mirko Bunjevčević	3	0	0	0	3	0
23	(Nigeria)	MF	Pius Ikedia	1	0	0	0	1	0
24	(Bulgaria)	FW	Enyo Krastovchev	1	0	0	0	1	0
			TOTALS	57	2	7	0	64	2
