= Jugo (disambiguation) =

Jugo is the name for the Mediterranean wind that blows from the Sahara.

Jugo may also refer to:

- Jugo bean, alternative name for the Bambara groundnut
- Jugo (Naruto), an antagonist in the Japanese animated series Naruto
- Jugo (poem), 1930s poem by Jakub Deml
- Zastava Koral, subcompact Yugoslav car widely known as the Yugo, or in some markets, the Jugo

People with the family name Jugo include:

- Jenny Jugo (1904–2001), Austrian film star
- Bogs Jugo (born 1979), drummer in Philippine rock band Pupil
- Amer Jugo (born 1982), Bosnian footballer

== See also ==
- Hugo (disambiguation)
- Yugo (disambiguation)
