= Bunjevčević =

Bunjevčević is a Serbian and Croatian surname, derived from the demonym Bunjevci. Notable people with the surname include:

- Goran Bunjevčević (1973–2018), former Serbian footballer
- Mirko Bunjevčević (born 1978), Serbian footballer
