= Sokolenko =

Sokolenko (Ukrainian: Соколенко) is a Ukrainian surname.

This surname is shared by the following people:

- Alla Sokolenko (born 1966), Ukrainian actress
- Andriy Sokolenko (born 1978), Ukrainian football defender
- Ivan Sokolenko, real name of Jan Zasidatel (1833-1893), Ukrainian portraitist
- Konstantin Sokolenko (born 1987), Kazakhstani Nordic combined skier
- Olha Sokolenko (born 1985) Ukrainian footballer
- Valeriy Sokolenko (born 1982), Ukrainian footballer
- Vasyl Sokolenko (1922-2018), Ukrainian artist
