= Toplica Spasojević =

Serbian businessman

- Born: 1956 (age 68–69); Svilajnac, Serbia
- Occupations: Businessman and ex-sports-team chairman

Toplica Spasojević (Serbian Cyrillic: Топлица Спасојевић; born 1956 in Svilajnac, Serbia, SFR Yugoslavia), is a former president of Red Star Belgrade. He has graduated from the University of Belgrade Faculty of Economics. Work experience: 1981–1992 Yugoslavia Commerce Belgrade, commercial manager, division manager, deputy general manager, chairman of the board of directors, 1992– MTI London, UK Director, 1993–1997 MTI Moscow, director, 1994–1999 ITM Company / ITM Group Belgrade, co-founder and general manager, 1999 Holding company ITM Group Belgrade Company chairman. Social engagement: 2005– Belgrade Commercial Chamber, president of the Trade Association, member of board of directors, member of Chamber Assembly, 2005– National project – Strategy for economic development of Serbia – member of team for economic development 2005– Economic team for Kosovo and Metohija and the South of Serbia Trade coordinator, 2006– member of board of executive directors of the Serbian business Club „Privrednik“, 2006– member of board of directors of Sports society Red Star Belgrade, 2007– The Serbian Economic Journalists Club Award "Businessman of the year for 2006", 2007– president of the Serbian Association of Corporate Managers (UKDS) 2007– vice president of NALED (National alliance for local and economic development), 2007– Serbian chamber of commerce Member of Chamber Assembly. He speaks English and Russian language.

== Red Star president 2007–2008 ==
On Tuesday, November 20, 2007, the Assembly of Red Star Belgrade football club elected Toplica Spasojević as president of Red Star Belgrade. In the Assembly meeting, Spasojević was appointed as new president with 52 votes in favour and 5 abstained. The Assembly has previously relieved his predecessor Dragan Stojković, who has been the club president since July 2005, of his duties. A newly appointed member of the Assembly of Red Star Belgrade is Vladica Popović in place of recently deceased Srđan Mrkušić.

Spasojević has informed the Assembly about the five-year plan for the development of the club and announced the making of a long-term plan. According to the new president, Red Star Belgrade has to keep the status of the biggest club in the central and southeastern parts of Europe, to form a scouts’ network in Serbia, and to transform its school into one of the best football schools in the world.

On March 2, 2008, Spasojević appointed former Red Star player Goran Bunjevčević to be the club's sporting director in charge of transfers and player personnel.

After failing to win the 2007–08 league title or Serbian Cup, Spasojević and Bunjevčević fared even worse during the 2008 summer transfer window. Bringing in Zdenek Zeman as the new head coach along with a series of uninspired signings, Red Star started 2008–09 season in disastrous fashion.

Spasojević and Bunjevčević left the club on September 2, 2008.

Also, he was a member of the KK Crvena zvezda managing board in 2009.
