= Yugo (disambiguation) =

Yugo was the name used by Zastava Automobiles in many export markets.

It may also refer to:

- Yūgo (given name), a masculine Japanese given name
- Yugo, Baltistan, a small village in the disputed Jammu and Kashmir region
- Yugo Amaryl, a fictional character in Isaac Asimov's Foundation series
- Yugo (manga), a Japanese manga series by Shinji Makari and Shū Akana
- King Yugo, the main character of the Wakfu (TV series)
- Yugo class submarine, midget submarines used by North Korea

== See also ==
- Yugo-nostalgia, a cultural phenomenon occurring among some citizens of the former Yugoslavia
- Yugo-Zapadnaya (Moscow Metro), the southwestern terminus of the Sokolnicheskaya Line
