= Eleandro Pema =

Albanian footballer

Personal information
- Full name: Eleandro Pema
- Date of birth: 9 February 1985 (age 41)
- Place of birth: Tirana, Albania
- Height: 1.80 m (5 ft 11 in)
- Position: Midfielder

Youth career
- 1997–2001: Skrapari
- 2001–2003: Samsunspor

Senior career*
Years	Team	Apps	(Gls)
2003–2004	Samsunspor	16	(7)
2004–2005	Tirana	5	(0)
2005–2006	Dinamo Tirana	8	(2)
2006–2007	Tirana	30	(5)
2007–2008	Dinamo Tirana	20	(4)
2008–2009	Flamurtari	8	(0)
2009	Elbasani	13	(1)
2009–2010	Kastrioti	31	(5)
2010–2011	AZAL	14	(0)
2011–2012	Kamza	15	(4)
2012–2013	Tirana	3	(0)
2013	Kastrioti	1	(0)
2014	Dinamo Tirana	0	(0)

International career
2001–2002	Albania U-17	3	(0)
2002–2003	Albania U-19	6	(0)
2004–2006	Albania U-21	4	(0)
- * Club domestic league appearances and goals

Eleandro Pema (born 9 February 1985) is an Albanian retired football striker. He last played for KS Dinamo

== Club career ==
He has previously played for Samsunspor in Turkey.

=== Career statistics ===
As of Match played 31 August 2013

Appearances and goals by club, season and competition
Club	Season	League			Cup		Other		Total	
Club	Season	Division	Apps	Goals	Apps	Goals	Apps	Goals	Apps	Goals
Kastrioti Krujë	2009–10	Albanian Superliga	31	5			-		31	5
AZAL	2010–11	Azerbaijan Premier League	14	0	3	2	-		17	2
Kamza	2011–12	Albanian Superliga	15	4	11	4	-		26	8
Tirana	2012–13	Albanian Superliga	3	0			-		3	0
Kastrioti Krujë	2013–14	Albanian Superliga	1	0			-		1	0
Career total			64	9	14	6	0	0	78	15
