= Vitaliy Postranskyi =

Ukrainian goalkeeper (born 1977)

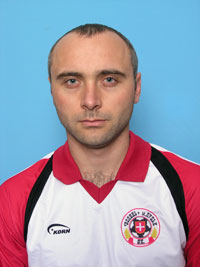

Personal information
- Full name: Vitaliy Mykhaylovych Postranskyi
- Date of birth: 2 August 1977 (age 49)
- Place of birth: Tyshkivtsi, Ivano-Frankivsk Oblast, Ukrainian SSR
- Height: 1.90 m (6 ft 3 in)
- Position: Goalkeeper

Youth career
- 1993: Youth Sportive School Lviv

Senior career*
Years	Team	Apps	(Gls)
1993	FC Halychyna Drohobych	1	(0)
1995	FC LAZ-Skify Lviv	2	(0)
1995	FC Sokil Lviv (Amateur)	9	(0)
1995–1997	FC Haray Zhovkva	38	(0)
1997–1998	FC Karpaty-2 Lviv	15	(0)
1998–2000	FC Lviv	40	(0)
2001	Rotor Volgograd	0	(0)
2001–2002	Kryvbas Kryvyi Rih	10	(0)
2002–2005	Vorskla Poltava	53	(0)
2002–2003	→FC Vorskla-2 Poltava	7	(0)
2005	Volyn Lutsk	20	(0)
2006–2009	Metalurh Zaporizhya	51	(0)
2009–2010	Simurq PFC	18	(0)
2010–2011	Tavriya Simferopol	7	(0)
2011–2012	Volyn Lutsk	0	(0)
2012–2014	Zorya Luhansk	27	(0)
- * Club domestic league appearances and goals as of 4 July 2014

Vitaliy Postranskyi (Ukrainian: Віталій Михайлович Постранський; born 2 August 1977) is a Ukrainian goalkeeper. He last played for Ukrainian side FC Zorya Luhansk.
