= Andriy Raspopov =

Ukrainian footballer

Personal information
- Full name: Andriy Mykolayovych Raspopov
- Date of birth: 25 June 1978 (age 48)
- Place of birth: Lviv, Ukrainian SSR
- Height: 1.89 m (6 ft 2 in)
- Position: Defender

Youth career
- 1996–1997: Torpedo Mykolaiv

Senior career*
Years	Team	Apps	(Gls)
1997	Mykolaiv	3	(0)
1997–1998	Olimpiya Yuzhnoukrainsk	26	(0)
1998	Mykolaiv	1	(0)
1998–1999	Olimpiya Yuzhnoukrainsk	19	(0)
2000	Kolos Stepove	10	(0)
2000–2002	Dnepr-Transmash Mogilev	38	(3)
2002–2003	Dinamo Minsk	40	(2)
2004–2007	Karpaty Lviv	81	(6)
2007	→ Karpaty-2 Lviv	4	(0)
2007–2009	Arsenal Kyiv	34	(0)
2009	Granit Mikashevichi	6	(0)
2010	Simurq	5	(0)
2010–2011	Dnepr Mogilev	51	(0)
2012	Vitebsk	16	(1)
- * Club domestic league appearances and goals

Andriy Mykolayovych Raspopov (Ukrainian: Андрій Миколайович Распопов; born 25 June 1978) is a retired Ukrainian footballer who last played for Belarusian First League club Vitebsk.
