= Teimuraz Gongadze =

Georgian footballer

Teymuraz Gongadze
Personal information
- Date of birth: 8 September 1985 (age 41)
- Place of birth: Tbilisi, Soviet Union
- Height: 1.73 m (5 ft 8 in)
- Position: Defender

Team information
- Current team: Rustavi
- Number: 32

Senior career*
Years	Team	Apps	(Gls)
2001–2003	Iveria Khashuri	32	(2)
2003–2004	Tbilisi	24	(0)
2004	Iveria Khashuri	15	(1)
2005	Sagarejo	30	(1)
2006	WIT Georgia-2 Tbilisi	27	(0)
2006–2008	Borjomi	22	(1)
2008	Meskheti Akhaltsikhe	11	(0)
2008–2009	Olimpi Rustavi	19	(0)
2009–2010	Simurq	12	(0)
2010–2011	Olimpi Rustavi	30	(0)
2011	Dinamo Tbilisi	8	(0)
2011–2013	Zestaponi	48	(2)
2013–2014	Dila Gori	14	(1)
2014	Zestaponi	15	(1)
2014–2015	Chikhura Sachkhere	16	(2)
2015–2016	Dila Gori	33	(3)
2017–2018	Lokomotivi Tbilisi	22	(0)
2018–	Rustavi	7	(0)

International career
2009	Georgia	2	(0)
- * Club domestic league appearances and goals as of 4 October 2018

Teymuraz Gongadze (Georgian: თეიმურაზ ღონღაძე; born 8 September 1985) is a Georgian footballer who plays as a defender. He was capped for the national team on 12 August 2009 against Malta.
