= Goran Bunjevčević =

Serbian footballer

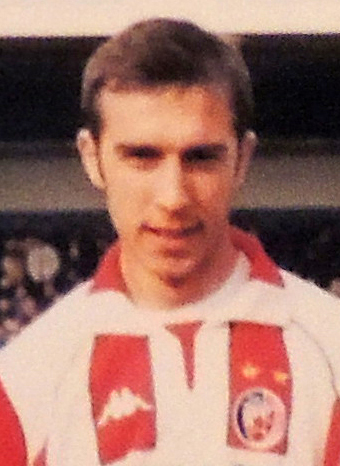
- Bunjevčević captaining Red Star Belgrade in 2000

Personal information
- Full name: Goran Bunjevčević
- Date of birth: 17 February 1973
- Place of birth: Karlovac, SR Croatia, SFR Yugoslavia
- Date of death: 28 June 2018 (aged 45)
- Place of death: Belgrade, Serbia
- Height: 1.90 m (6 ft 3 in)
- Position: Defender

Youth career
- Hajduk Split

Senior career*
Years	Team	Apps	(Gls)
1991–1992	BASK	14	(0)
1992–1994	Grafičar Belgrade	25	(1)
1994–1997	Rad Belgrade	76	(5)
1997–2001	Red Star Belgrade	125	(16)
2001–2006	Tottenham Hotspur	51	(0)
2006–2007	ADO Den Haag	23	(1)
Total		314	(23)

International career
1998–2003	FR Yugoslavia / Serbia and Montenegro	16	(0)
- * Club domestic league appearances and goals

Goran Bunjevčević (Serbian Cyrillic: Горан Буњевчевић, pronounced [ɡǒran buɲêʋtʃeʋitɕ]; 17 February 1973 – 28 June 2018) was a Serbian footballer who played as a defender in Serbia, England and the Netherlands.

== Playing career ==
=== Club career ===
==== Tottenham Hotspur ====
Bunjevčević joined Tottenham Hotspur in May 2001 from Red Star Belgrade for a reported fee of £5 million. He made his Premier League debut on 18 August against Aston Villa in a 0–0 draw. In September of the 2001–02 season Tottenham played Chelsea in the league and Bunjevčević suffered a fractured cheekbone which left him out of the squad till December.

Starting only in League Cup matches, during the 2004–05 season he scored his only goals (two) for the club (in the 6–0 away defeat of Oldham Athletic on 22 September in the competition, and a late equaliser in the 4–3 away win against Bolton Wanderers on 29 October that took the game into extra time). He was released on 26 May 2006 after five years at White Hart Lane and making a total of 58 appearances in all competitions.

==== ADO Den Haag ====
After release by Tottenham, Bunjevčević joined Dutch outfit ADO Den Haag. He played at the club for one season before retiring.

=== International career ===
Bunjevčević was a member of the FR Yugoslavia side at the UEFA Euro 2000 but he did not appear in any matches. In total, he collected sixteen caps between 1998 and 2003 for the national side.

== Administrative career ==
At the beginning of March 2008 he was named as Red Star Belgrade's sporting director, replacing Stevan Stojanović in the position. Bunjevčević worked at the post under club president Toplica Spasojević. On 2 September 2008 Bunjevčević left Red Star Belgrade along with club president Spasojević.

By December 2014, it had been 3 years since he became the chairman of FK Zemun.

In May 2016, Bunjevčević was elected into an executive board of the Football Association of Serbia under a new president, Slaviša Kokeza.

He became sport director of the association, managing among others the appointment of the national team coach.

== Personal life ==
His younger brother Mirko was also a footballer.

== Death ==
On 20 May 2018, Bunjevčević suffered an aneurysm followed by a stroke and had to undergo emergency surgery. While in hospital care, the Serbia national team at the FIFA World Cup beat Costa Rica 1–0, and the team captain and only scorer Aleksandar Kolarov dedicated the goal and the win to Bunjevčević. On 28 June 2018, Bunjevčević died at the age of 45 after over a month in a coma.

== Career statistics ==
=== International ===
National team	Year	Apps	Goals
FR Yugoslavia	1998	1	0
FR Yugoslavia	1999	0	0
FR Yugoslavia	2000	9	0
FR Yugoslavia	2001	3	0
FR Yugoslavia	2002	1	0
Serbia and Montenegro	2003	2	0
Total		16	0

== Honours ==
Red Star Belgrade

- First League of FR Yugoslavia: 1999–00, 2000–01
- FR Yugoslavia Cup: 1998–99, 1999–00
