= Yūgo (given name) =

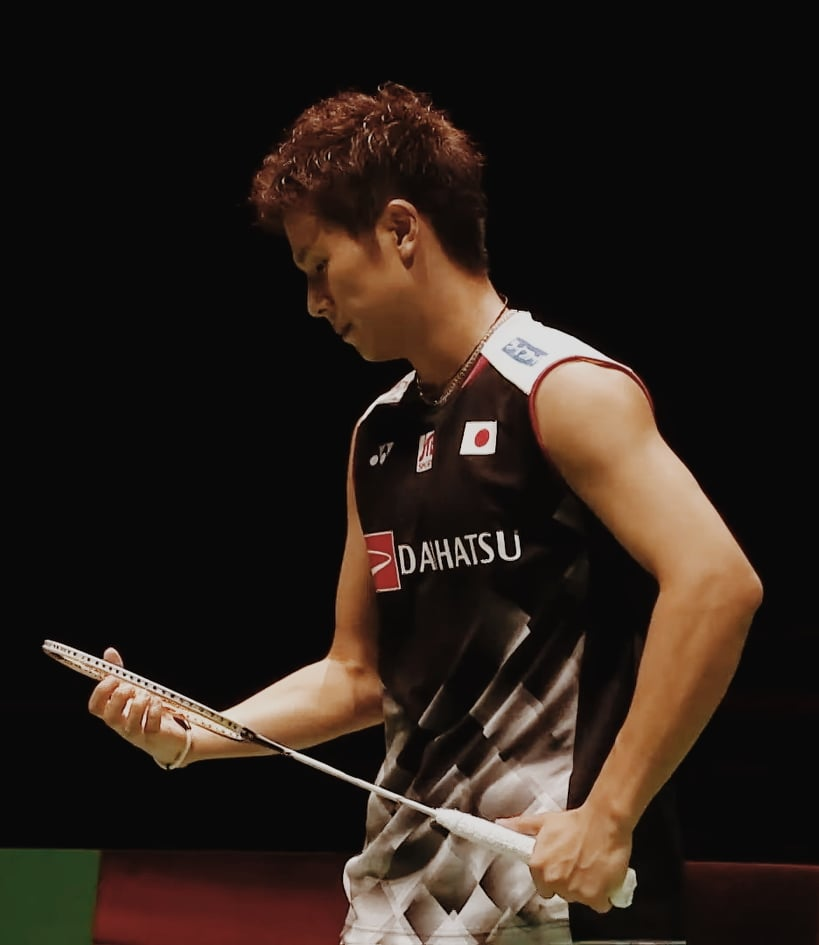
- Yūgo Kobayashi, Japanese badminton player
- Pronunciation: /jɯːgo/, /jɯːgoː/ (IPA)
- Gender: Male

Origin
- Origin: Japanese
- Meaning: Different meanings depending on the kanji used

Yūgo, Yugo or Yuugo is a masculine Japanese given name.

== Written forms ==
Yūgo can be written using many different combinations of kanji characters. Here are some examples:

- 勇五, "courage, five"
- 勇伍, "courage, five"
- 勇吾, "courage, I/my"
- 勇悟, "courage, realize/become aware"
- 勇護, "courage, protect"
- 雄伍, "masculine, five"
- 雄吾, "masculine, I/my"
- 雄悟, "masculine, realize/become aware"
- 悠五, "calm, five"
- 悠吾, "calm, I/my"
- 悠悟, "calm, realize/become aware"
- 優吾, "gentleness, I/my"
- 優悟, "gentleness, realize/become aware"
- 有護, "have, protect"
- 友悟, "friend, realize/become aware"
- 祐午, "help, noon/sign of the horse"
- 裕吾, "abundant, I/my"

The name can also be written in hiragana ゆうご or katakana ユウゴ.

Yūgō or Yuugou is a separate Japanese given name, though it may be romanized the same way Yugo.

- 勇剛, "courage, strength"
- 勇豪, "courage, overpowering"
- 雄剛, "masculine, strength"
- 雄豪, "masculine, overpowering"
- 悠剛, "calm, strength"
- 悠豪, "calm, overpowering"
- 優剛, "gentleness, strength"
- 優豪, "gentleness, overpowering"
- 有剛, "have, strength"
- 友剛, "friend, strength"
- 祐豪, "help, overpowering"
- 由豪, "reason, overpowering"

The name can also be written in hiragana ゆうごう or katakana ユウゴウ.

== Notable people with the name ==
- Yugo Ichiyanagi (一柳 夢吾; born 1985), Japanese footballer
- Yūgo Ishikawa (石川 優吾; born 1960), Japanese manga artist
- Yugo Kanno (菅野 祐悟; born 1977), Japanese music composer
- Yugo Kobayashi (小林 優吾; born 1995), Japanese badminton player
- Yugo Kobayashi (footballer) (born 1991), Japanese footballer
- Yugo Nakamura (中村 勇吾; born 1970), Japanese web designer
- Yugo Takahashi (高橋 裕吾), Japanese voice actor
- Yugo Takeuchi (竹内 雄悟; born 1987), Japanese shogi player
- Yugo Miyajima (宮島 優心, born 2000), member of Orbit, Produce 101 Japan contestant
- Yugo Sako (酒向 雄豪; c. 1928 – 2012), Japanese filmmaker
- Yugo Shinohara (篠原 祐剛; born 1978), Japanese speed skater

Fictional characters:

- Yugo Beppu (別府 勇午), the main character in the manga and anime series Yugo
- Yugo Ogami (大神 勇吾), a character in the video game series Bloody Roar
- Yugo, a character in the anime series Yu-Gi-Oh! Arc-V
- Yugo, a character in the manga series The Promised Neverland
