= Tural Jalilov =

Azerbaijani footballer (born 1986)

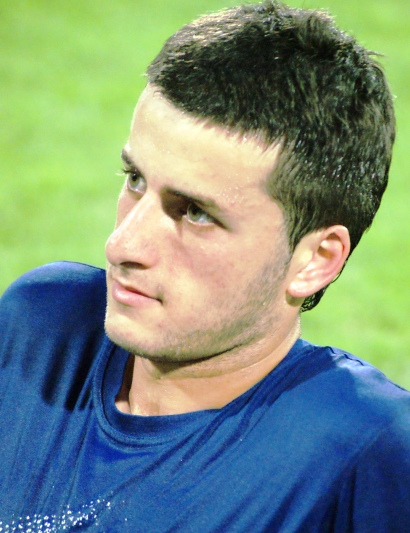

Personal information
- Full name: Tural Alim oğlu Cəlilov
- Date of birth: 28 November 1986 (age 39)
- Place of birth: Khachmaz, Azerbaijan
- Height: 1.70 m (5 ft 7 in)
- Position: Midfielder

Team information
- Current team: Shimal FK
- Number: 18

Senior career*
Years	Team	Apps	(Gls)
2005–2006	Adliyya Baku		
2006–2007	Ganclarbirliyi	10	(0)
2007–2010	Simurq	64	(4)
2010–2011	Khazar Lankaran	3	(0)
2011–2013	Ravan Baku	17	(0)
2013–2016	Khazar Lankaran	81	(0)
2016–2017	Zira	9	(0)
2017–2018	Kapaz	15	(0)
2024–	Shimal FK	12	(1)

International career
2008–	Azerbaijan	4	(0)
- * Club domestic league appearances and goals as of 24 December 2025

Tural Jalilov (Azerbaijani: Tural Cəlilov, born 28 November 1986) is an Azerbaijani professional footballer who plays for Azerbaijan First League club Shimal FK.

== Career ==
Jalilov left Zira FK on 2 May 2017. On 11 May 2017, Jalilov signed a one-year contract with Kapaz PFK.

In 2024, Jalilov returned to football at the age of 38 with the third-tier club Shimal FK after not playing for 6 seasons, and advanced to the second-tier Azerbaijan First League for the 2025–26 season.

== Career statistics ==
=== Club ===
As of match played 20 May 2018

Appearances and goals by club, season and competition
Club	Season	League			National Cup		Continental		Other		Total	
Club	Season	Division	Apps	Goals	Apps	Goals	Apps	Goals	Apps	Goals	Apps	Goals
Gänclärbirliyi Sumqayit	2007–08	Azerbaijan Premier League	10	0			–		–		10	0
Simurq	2007–08	Azerbaijan Premier League	10	0			–		–		10	0
Simurq	2008–09	Azerbaijan Premier League	26	3			–		–		26	3
Simurq	2009–10	Azerbaijan Premier League	28	1			1	0	–		29	1
Simurq	Total		64	4			1	0	-	-	65	4
Khazar Lankaran	2010–11	Azerbaijan Premier League	3	0	1	0	0	0	–		4	0
Ravan Baku	2011–12	Azerbaijan Premier League	15	0	1	0	–		–		16	0
Ravan Baku	2012–13	Azerbaijan Premier League	13	0	1	0	–		–		14	0
Ravan Baku	Total		28	0	2	0	-	-	-	-	30	0
Khazar Lankaran	2013–14	Azerbaijan Premier League	22	0	4	0	0	0	0	0	26	0
Khazar Lankaran	2014–15	Azerbaijan Premier League	24	0	2	0	–		–		26	0
Khazar Lankaran	2015–16	Azerbaijan Premier League	35	0	3	0	–		–		38	0
Khazar Lankaran	Total		81	0	9	0	0	0	0	0	90	0
Zira	2010–11	Azerbaijan Premier League	9	0	3	0	–		–		12	0
Kapaz	2017–18	Azerbaijan Premier League	15	0	3	0	0	0	–		18	0
Career total			210	4	19	0	1	0	0	0	230	0

=== International ===
Azerbaijan national team
Year	Apps	Goals
2008	1	0
2009	3	0
Total	4	0

Statistics accurate as of match played 15 November 2009

== Honours ==
=== Player ===
- Khazar Lankaran
  - Azerbaijan Supercup (1) – 2013
