= Amer Jugo =

Bosnian-Herzegovinian footballer

Personal information
- Date of birth: 5 December 1982 (age 43)
- Place of birth: Trebinje, Bosnia and Herzegovina
- Height: 1.78 m (5 ft 10 in)
- Position: Midfielder

Youth career
- Velež Mostar

Senior career*
Years	Team	Apps	(Gls)
2001–2008	Velež Mostar	50	(5)
2008	Laktaši	11	(3)
2009–2010	Velež Mostar	26	(0)
2010	Mughan	20	(3)
2011	Olimpik	7	(0)
2012	Velež Mostar	13	(1)
2012-2014	Gradina	3	(0)
2015	Turbina	7	(0)

International career
2008–2009	Bosnia and Herzegovina	2	(0)
- * Club domestic league appearances and goals as of January 2012

Amer Jugo (born 5 December 1982) is a Bosnian-Herzegovinian retired footballer. He played for FK Velež Mostar in Bosnian-Herzegovinian Premier League.

== International career ==
He made his debut for Bosnia and Herzegovina in a January 2008 friendly match away against Japan and has earned a total of 2 caps, scoring no goals. His second and final international was a June 2009 friendly against Uzbekistan.
