= Nikolay Valev =

Bulgarian footballer

Personal information
- Full name: Nikolay Valev
- Date of birth: 24 April 1980 (age 46)
- Place of birth: Yambol, Bulgaria
- Height: 1.88 m (6 ft 2 in)
- Position: Forward

Team information
- Current team: Tundzha Yambol
- Number: 9

Senior career*
Years	Team	Apps	(Gls)
2003–2004	Spartak Varna	22	(3)
2004	Cherno more	3	(0)
2005–2006	Svetkavitsa	13	(7)
2006–2008	Cypriot club	?	(?)
2009	Slavia Sofia	6	(0)
2009–2010	Simurg	17	(2)
2010	Mughan	7	(0)
2011–2012	Svetkavitsa	29	(6)
2013	Dobrudzha Dobrich	?	(?)
2014–	Tundzha Yambol	0	(0)
- * Club domestic league appearances and goals as of 9 August 2014

Nikolay Valev (Bulgarian: Николай Вълев; born 24 April 1980 in Yambol) is a Bulgarian football forward who currently plays for Tundzha Yambol.
