= Ruslan Hunchak =

Ukrainian football player (born 1979)

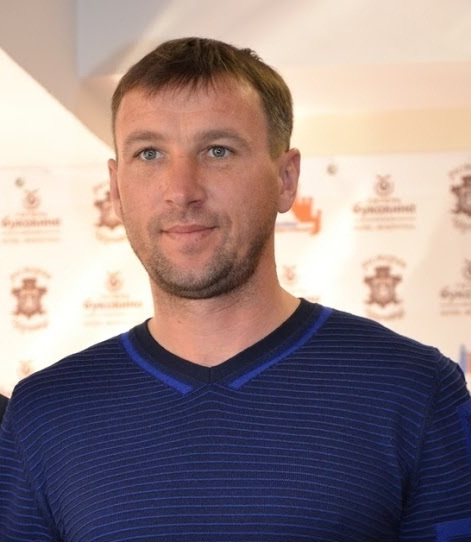

Personal information
- Full name: Ruslan Ivanovych Hunchak
- Date of birth: 9 August 1979 (age 47)
- Place of birth: Shyshkivtsi, Chernivtsi Oblast, Soviet Union (now Ukraine)
- Height: 1.86 m (6 ft 1 in)
- Position: Midfielder

Senior career*
Years	Team	Apps	(Gls)
1998–2001	Bukovyna Chernivtsi	95	(12)
2002	Prykarpattya Ivano-Frankivsk	17	(0)
2002–2004	Illichivets Mariupol	46	(2)
2004	→ Illichivets-2 Mariupol	4	(2)
2004–2005	Metalist Kharkiv	24	(4)
2005–2009	Kharkiv	71	(6)
2009	Luzhany	4	(1)
2009–2010	Simurq Zaqatala	31	(7)
2010–2012	Bukovyna Chernivtsi	75	(30)
2013–2016	Naftan Novopolotsk	117	(15)
2017	Bukovyna Chernivtsi	1	(0)

Managerial career
- 2017: Bukovyna Chernivtsi (assistant)
- * Club domestic league appearances and goals

Ruslan Hunchak (born 9 August 1979) is a retired professional Ukrainian football midfielder.
