= Davit Bolkvadze =

Georgian footballer

Personal information
- Date of birth: 5 June 1980 (age 46)
- Place of birth: Tbilisi, Georgian SSR, Soviet Union
- Height: 1.72 m (5 ft 8 in)
- Position: Midfielder

Team information
- Current team: Merani Tbilisi
- Number: 24

Senior career*
Years	Team	Apps	(Gls)
1998–1999	Guria Lantchkhuti	11	(0)
1999–2002	Merani Tbilisi	62	(8)
2002–2003	WIT Georgia	16	(1)
2003–2004	Spartaki Tbilisi	20	(0)
2004–2005	Torpedo Kutaisi	43	(7)
2005–2006	Sioni Bolnisi	15	(3)
2006–2008	Ameri Tbilisi	36	(3)
2008–2010	Simurq Zaqatala	66	(12)
2010–2011	Olimpi Rustavi	32	(7)
2011–2012	Torpedo Kutaisi	16	(1)
2012	Sioni Bolnisi	3	(0)
2012–2013	Zugdidi	17	(1)
2013	Chikhura Sachkhere	9	(0)
2013–2014	Dila Gori	25	(4)
2014	Merani Martvili	13	(1)
2015	Samtredia	11	(0)
2015	Tskhinvali	1	(0)
2016	Sapovnela Terjola	11	(0)
2016–2017	Kolkheti-1913 Poti	36	(1)
2018	Merani Martvili	14	(2)
2018–	Merani Tbilisi	28	(5)

International career
2007	Georgia	1	(0)
- * Club domestic league appearances and goals as of 17 August 2019

Davit Bolkvadze (Georgian: დავით ბოლქვაძე; born 5 June 1980) is a Georgian footballer who currently plays as a midfielder for Merani Tbilisi. He was capped for the national team on 12 September 2007.
