= Serghei Lașcencov =

Moldovan footballer

Personal information
- Full name: Serghei Lașcencov
- Date of birth: 24 March 1980 (age 46)
- Place of birth: Zdolbuniv, Ukrainian SSR
- Height: 1.78 m (5 ft 10 in)
- Position: Defender

Senior career*
| Years | Team | Apps | (Gls) |
| 1996–1997 | Ciuhur Ocnița | 6 | (2) |
| 1997–2004 | Nistru Otaci | 160 | (3) |
| 2005 | Metalist Kharkiv | 10 | (0) |
| 2005–2007 | Illichivets Mariupol | 24 | (1) |
| 2007–2008 | Karpaty Lviv | 21 | (0) |
| 2008–2010 | Olimpik Baku | 44 | (2) |

International career^{‡}
| 2004–2009 | Moldova | 36 | (0) |
- * Club domestic league appearances and goals as of 24 May 2009 ‡ National team caps and goals as of 1 December 2009

Serghei Lașcencov (Ukrainian: Сергій Миколайович Лащенков, born 24 March 1980 in Zdolbuniv, Ukrainian SSR) is a retired Moldovan footballer and the former captain of the Moldovan national team. In 2010, he was disqualified for five years for match-fixing.

== Career ==
In the summer of 2008 Lașcencov moved to Azerbaijan Premier League side Olimpik Baku on an initial one-year contract. For the 2009–10 season he was made captain of the team.

In August 2010, Lașcencov was given a lifetime ban from football for his involvement in the match-fixing surrounding Metalist Kharkiv and Karpaty Lviv's game on 19 April 2008 during the 2007–08 season. On 17 October 2010, his ban was reduced to five years, a decision that was upheld by CAS in August 2013.

== Career statistics ==
| Season | Club | League | League | | Cup | | Continental | | Total | |
| Season | Club | League | App | Goals | App | Goals | App | Goals | App | Goals |
|---|---|---|---|---|---|---|---|---|---|---|
| 1996–97 | Ciuhur Ocnița | Moldovan National Division | 6 | 2 | | | - | | 6 | 2 |
| 1997–98 | Nistru Otaci | Moldovan National Division | 9 | 1 | | | - | | 9 | 1 |
| 1998–99 | Nistru Otaci | Moldovan National Division | 10 | 0 | | | - | | 10 | 0 |
| 1999–2000 | Nistru Otaci | Moldovan National Division | 30 | 0 | | | - | | 30 | 0 |
| 2000–01 | Nistru Otaci | Moldovan National Division | 26 | 0 | | | | | 26 | 0 |
| 2001–02 | Nistru Otaci | Moldovan National Division | 26 | 0 | | | 1 | 0 | 27 | 0 |
| 2002–03 | Nistru Otaci | Moldovan National Division | 22 | 1 | | | 2 | 0 | 24 | 1 |
| 2003–04 | Nistru Otaci | Moldovan National Division | 27 | 1 | | | 2 | 0 | 29 | 1 |
| 2004–05 | Nistru Otaci | Moldovan National Division | 10 | 0 | | | 4 | 0 | 14 | 0 |
| 2004–05 | Metalist Kharkiv | Ukrainian Premier League | 10 | 0 | | | - | | 10 | 0 |
| 2005–06 | Illichivets Mariupol | Ukrainian Premier League | 7 | 1 | | | - | | 7 | 1 |
| 2006–07 | Illichivets Mariupol | Ukrainian Premier League | 17 | 0 | | | - | | 17 | 0 |
| 2007–08 | Karpaty Lviv | Ukrainian Premier League | 21 | 0 | | | - | | 21 | 0 |
| 2008–09 | Olimpik Baku | Azerbaijan Premier League | 19 | 2 | | | 2 | 0 | 21 | 0 |
| 2009–10 | Olimpik Baku | Azerbaijan Premier League | 25 | 0 | | | - | | 25 | 0 |
| Total | | | 265 | 8 | | | 11 | 0 | 276 | 8 |

== International career ==
Lașcencov made his debut for Moldova in 2004, going on to make 36 appearances and captain the team before his ban.
