= Andriy Sokolenko =

Ukrainian footballer

Personal information
- Full name: Andriy Sokolenko
- Date of birth: 8 June 1978 (age 48)
- Place of birth: Simferopol, Ukrainian SSR, Soviet Union
- Height: 1.81 m (5 ft 11 1/2 in)
- Position: Defender

Youth career
- 1994–1996: Tavriya Simferopol

Senior career*
Years	Team	Apps	(Gls)
1995–1996	Tavriya Simferopol	2	(0)
1996–1997	Dynamo Saky	18	(0)
1998–1999	Prykarpattya Ivano-Frankivsk	1	(0)
1999–2000	Kryvbas Kryvyi Rih	0	(0)
1999–2000	→ Kryvbas-2 Kryvyi Rih	17	(0)
2000–2002	Prykarpattya Ivano-Frankivsk	42	(1)
2002–2003	Volyn Lutsk	20	(0)
2003	Dinamo Minsk	9	(2)
2004–2005	Aktobe	58	(3)
2006	Volyn Lutsk	10	(1)
2006	Obolon Kyiv	15	(0)
2007–2008	Kharkiv	44	(2)
2009	Prykarpattya Ivano-Frankivsk	7	(1)
2009	Simurq	9	(0)
2011–2012	Enerhetyk Burshtyn	20	(0)
- * Club domestic league appearances and goals

Andriy Sokolenko (Ukrainian: Андрій Євгенович Соколенко; born 8 June 1978) is a former Ukrainian football defender.
