= Bechir Mogaadi =

Tunisian footballer

Personal information
- Date of birth: 11 April 1978 (age 48)
- Place of birth: Menzel Bourguiba, Tunisia
- Height: 1.76 m (5 ft 9 in)
- Position: Midfielder

Senior career*
Years	Team	Apps	(Gls)
1999–2002	ES Sahel	71	(13)
2003–2004	Espérance Tunis	20	(5)
2004–2006	FK Karvan	33	(5)
2006–2008	ES Hammam Sousse	54	(19)
2008–2009	Olimpik Baku	18	(2)
2009–2010	FK Karvan	8	(0)
2010	EM Mahdia	7	(6)
2011–2012	Numancia	41	(10)
2013–2014	Zanaco FC	16	(8)

International career
2000	Tunisia	1	(0)
- * Club domestic league appearances and goals

Bechir Mogaadi (born 11 April 1978) is a Tunisian former professional footballer who played as a midfielder.

== Career statistics ==
Club performance			League		Cup		Continental		Total	
Season	Club	League	Apps	Goals	Apps	Goals	Apps	Goals	Apps	Goals
Azerbaijan			League		Azerbaijan Cup		Europe		Total	
2004-05	FK Karvan	Azerbaijan Premier League	11	0			-		11	0
2005-06	FK Karvan	Azerbaijan Premier League	12	2			-		12	2
2006-07	FK Karvan	Azerbaijan Premier League	6	2			3	0	9	2
2008-09	Olimpik Baku	Azerbaijan Premier League	18	2			2	0	20	2
2009-10	FK Karvan	Azerbaijan Premier League	8	0		1	-		8	1
Total	Azerbaijan		55	6		1	4	0	59	7
Career total			55	6		1	4	0	59	7
