= Mirko Bunjevčević =

Serbian footballer

Personal information
- Full name: Mirko Bunjevčević
- Date of birth: February 5, 1978 (age 48)
- Place of birth: Karlovac, SFR Yugoslavia
- Height: 1.86 m (6 ft 1 in)
- Position: Defender

Youth career
- Hajduk Split
- Dinamo Zagreb
- Grafičar Beograd
- Radnički Beograd
- Petrova Gora Vojnić

Senior career*
Years	Team	Apps	(Gls)
1997–1998	IM Rakovica		
1998–2001	Rad	39	(?)
2001–2003	Koper	52	(4)
2003	Mura	16	(2)
2004–2006	Arsenal Kyiv	55	(1)
2006	Hajduk Kula	12	(1)
2007–2009	Zorya Luhansk	32	(2)
2009	Čukarički	11	(1)
2010–2011	AZAL	44	(3)
2011–2014	Zemun	31	(0)
2014–2015	Brodarac 1947	21	(1)
- * Club domestic league appearances and goals

Mirko Bunjevčević (Serbian Cyrillic: Мирко Буњевчевић; born February 5, 1978) is a Serbian former professional footballer who played as a defender. He is currently a coach in the Red Star youth academy.

== Career ==
Born in Karlovac (SR Croatia, SFR Yugoslavia), he started playing football since young age, along his elder brother Goran Bunjevčević who later became Serbian international. Their talent was soon spotted by the most prominent Croatian clubs HNK Hajduk Split and NK Dinamo Zagreb who brought them to their youth teams. Later, they moved to Serbian capital Belgrade, and, after playing for some period with RFK Grafičar Beograd, Goran, 5 years older, will begin his top flight career by joining FK Rad, playing back then in the First League of FR Yugoslavia, while Mirko continued playing in youth levels with FK Radnički Beograd.

After gaining some senior experience by playing one season with lower-league side IM Rakovica, his career will burst in 1998 when he joined FK Rad, a club that his brother successfully represented for four seasons and that led him to sign with local powerhouse Red Star Belgrade a year before Mirko arrived. However this period was much harder generally for football in Serbia, as the country experienced the Kosovo war, NATO bombing and major political turmoil during this time.

Thus Mirko, after spending three seasons with Rad, moved for the first time abroad, by joining Slovenian side FC Koper in summer 2001. He will play two and a half seasons in the Slovenian First League, first two with Koper, and a half season with NK Mura. He played with Koper in the 2002 UEFA Intertoto Cup where they were defeated by Swedish side Helsingborgs IF (0–1; 0–0) in the first round.

In early 2004 he signed a contract with FC Arsenal Kyiv starting a period of almost five years spent in the Ukrainian Premier League. He became a standard player in the team gathering 55 league appearances in two and a half years he spent in Kyiv. The club had mid table results, finishing 9th, 9th and 12th respectively in the seasons he spent there. He left Arsenal in summer 2006 and returned to Serbia where he was one of the signings of FK Hajduk Kula for their 2006–07 UEFA Cup campaign. However after a narrow away-goals defeat in their tied matches against Bulgarian PFC CSKA Sofia (1–1; 0–0) their European campaign came to an end. Bunjevčević played the rest of the first half of the season with Hajduk in the Serbian SuperLiga, but during the winter break he moved back to Ukraine reinforcing the newly promoted Premier League side FC Zorya Luhansk. The club surprisingly became a mid table regular mostly by combining domestic players with Bunjevčević and other signings.

In summer 2009 he returned again to the Serbian SuperLiga, this time joining Belgrade-based FK Čukarički, however, he will stay only half a season, as he will join during the winter break Azerbaijani side Olimpik Baku. The club was just entering into a new era, and it had just had their first ever European participation where they lost against, coincidentally, a Serbian side, FK Vojvodina. Soon after Bunjevčević joined them, the club was renamed for sponsorship reasons into AZAL PFC. During the 2009–10 season AZAL finished 7th in the league, however at beginning of the season a new coach Nazim Suleymanov was appointed and he started a revolution in the club, to which Bunjevčević much contributed in archiving the 4th place at the end of the 2010–11 Azerbaijan Premier League, as he was a starter in 31 of 32 league matches that season. That result led them to the qualifiers for the 2011–12 UEFA Europa League, however their European campaign ended up in disappointment as they lost in the first qualifying round against Belarusian side FC Minsk (1–1; 1–2). As the spirit was high, before the matches had been played coach Suleymanov had promised to resign if the team ended defeated, and as the fortune was not on his side, he kept the promise and so he did. In the following winter break Mirko Bunjevčević also left. During the period he spent with AZAL the club had reached twice the semi-finals of the Azerbaijan Cup.

Bunjevčević returned to Serbia during the winter break of the 2011–12 season, and he joined a historical side FK Zemun. They had been going through a major crisis as they had been relegated the summer before to the Serbian League Belgrade, one of four Serbian third level leagues.
