= Roman Akhalkatsi =

Georgian former footballer

Personal information
- Date of birth: 20 February 1980 (age 46)
- Place of birth: Gori, Georgia, Soviet Union
- Height: 1.80 m (5 ft 11 in)
- Position: Midfielder

Senior career*
Years	Team	Apps	(Gls)
1998–1999	Dila Gori	26	(5)
1999	Shumen	4	(0)
1999–2001	Kolkheti Poti	23	(1)
2001–2004	Torpedo Kutaisi	59	(3)
2004	Lokomotiv Moscow	0	(0)
2004	→ Baltika Kaliningrad (loan)	20	(0)
2005–2008	Karvan	41	(10)
2008–2009	Olimpik Baku	25	(1)
2009–2010	Simurq Zaqatala	18	(0)
2010–2011	Olimpi Rustavi	4	(0)
2011–2013	Dila Gori	48	(7)
2013	Metalurgi Rustavi	9	(1)
2013–2016	Dila Gori	33	(3)
- * Club domestic league appearances and goals

Roman Akhalkatsi (Georgian: რომან ახალკაცი; born 20 February 1980) is a Georgian former footballer who played as a midfielder.

He was the first Georgian to play in the A PFG.

== Azerbaijan statistics ==
Season	Club	League	League		Cup		Other		Continental		Total	
Season	Club	League	App	Goals	App	Goals	App	Goals	App	Goals	App	Goals
Azerbaijan			League		Azerbaijan Cup		Supercup		Europe		Total	
2005–06	Karvan	Azerbaijan Premier League	13	1			-		-		13	1
2006–07	Karvan	Azerbaijan Premier League	7	0			-		4	0	11	0
2007–08	Karvan	Azerbaijan Premier League	21	9			-		-		21	9
2008–09	Olimpik Baku	Azerbaijan Premier League	21	1			-		2	1	23	2
2009–10	Simurq	Azerbaijan Premier League	18	0	2	0	-		2	0	22	0
Total	Azerbaijan		80	11	2	0	-		8	1	90	12
Career total			80	11	2	0	-		8	1	90	12
