= Diano (footballer) =

Brazilian footballer (born 1981)

Personal information
- Full name: Claudiano Alves dos Santos
- Date of birth: 7 October 1981 (age 45)
- Place of birth: Serra Negra, São Paulo, Brazil
- Height: 1.84 m (6 ft 0 in)
- Position: Defender

Senior career*
Years	Team	Apps	(Gls)
2001–2005	Guaçuano		
2005–2008	Belasitsa Petrich	62	(2)
2007	→ Levski Sofia (loan)	0	(0)
2008–2010	Olimpik Baku	49	(4)
2010–2011	Sriwijaya FC	25	(2)
- * Club domestic league appearances and goals

Claudiano Alves dos Santos (born 7 October 1981), better known as Diano, is a Brazilian former professional footballer who played as a defender.

== Career ==
Diano started his career at Guaçuano before being signed by Belasitsa Petrich on 19 July 2005. Diano joined Levski Sofia on loan for the second half of the 2006–07 season before leaving for Olimpik Baku in 2008. Diano spent two seasons with Olimpik Baku before joining Sriwijaya FC in the Indonesia Super League.

== Career statistics ==
As of 16 August 2013

Season	Club	League	League		Cup		Continental		Total	
Season	Club	League	App	Goals	App	Goals	App	Goals	App	Goals
2005–06	Belasitsa Petrich	A Group	26	2			-		26	2
2006–07	Belasitsa Petrich	A Group	11	0			-		11	0
2006–07	Levski Sofia (loan)	A Group	0	0			-		0	0
2007–08	Belasitsa Petrich	A Group	25	0			-		25	0
2008–09	Olimpik Baku	Azerbaijan Premier League	21	1			2	0	23	1
2009–10	Olimpik Baku	Azerbaijan Premier League	28	3			-		28	3
2010–11	Sriwijaya	Indonesia Super League	23	2			8	1	31	3
Total			134	8			10	1	144	9

== Honours ==
Sriwijaya FC

- Piala Indonesia: 2010
- Indonesian Community Shield: 2010
- Indonesian Inter Island Cup: 2010
