= Drobnjaci =

Historical tribe and region in Montenegro

Drobnjaci (Serbian Cyrillic: Дробњаци, pronounced [dro̞bɲǎːt͡si]) was a tribe and historical region, Drobnjak, in Old Herzegovina in Montenegro (municipalities from Nikšić to Šavnik, Žabljak and Pljevlja). Its unofficial centre is in Šavnik. The Serb Orthodox families have St. George (Đurđevdan) as their patron saint (slava) and the majority of churches in Drobnjak are dedicated to St. George as well. Families of distant Drobnjak origin are present in all former Yugoslav republics and in Hungary and Hungarian-populated parts of Romania and Slovakia, where it is spelled in its Magyarized form as Drobnyák.

== History ==
=== Origin and early history ===
According to Serbian historian Andrija Luburić (1930), by oral tradition their origin was from Travnik in Bosnia and Herzegovina, and initially were called as Novljani. First mention of the name was in 1285 Ragusan document, where was mentioned Vlach Bratinja Drobnjak. Term Vlach has germanic root walh meaning foreigner. The surname probably derives from tribal or regional name.

The Novljani were a medieval Serb community, which became a component part of the Drobnjaci tribe in Old Herzegovina (in Montenegro). According to folklore, the Novljani settled Bosnia at the time of the Serb settlement in the Balkans, then later crossed into the Banjani plateau in Old Herzegovina. From there, the Novljani and other Serb tribes pushed out the native population towards the Tara and source of Morača, and towards the south, Podgorica, and then settled and divided the conquered lands between themselves. This happened in olden times, surely prior to the 13th century. The Novljani received the wide land that later encompassed the tribes of Banjani and Drobnjaci. The larger part of Novljani that settled Drobnjak inhabited the whole region between Onogošt (Nikšić) and the Tara river, and from at that time the Piva border to Upper Morača — this part of the Novljani was later named Drobnjaci. The Novljani first settled "korito Drobnjaka" in the area of Drobnjak, where they founded settlements. In Drobnjak, the tribe held the land through which the Roman Onogošt–Pirliktor merchant road crossed. After expanding in numbers, they took over Jezera from the Kriči tribe.

The Novljani settled as an organized tribe, headed by a vojvoda and several knezovi. They settled the area of Drobnjak and called themselves the Drobnjaci. It is unknown whether they collectively descend from one ancestor or a group of various families connected to the general tribal organization.

According to folklore, a part of the Drobnjak families descend from the old Novljani. Today the Novljani number 113 families out of 385 of the Drobnjaci. The Kosovčić brotherhood was the most numerous of the tribe, and for long led the whole tribe of Drobnjaci, also enumerated in epic poetry. Another notable brotherhood, which also led the whole tribe, was the Kosorić.

The tribal name Drobnjaci (Drobignaçich, Drobgnach, Droggnaz, Dropgnach, Drupinach, Idobrignach) in Herzegovina can be followed from 14th century Ragusan sources; Dragossius Costadinich vlachus Drobignaçich (1365), Goitan Banilouich et Bogosclauus Dessiminich vlacchi de chatono de Dobrgnaçi (1376), Vulchota filius Dobroslaui Drobgnach (1377), Dubraueç Chostadinich et Jurech Bogutouich Drobnachi (1377), and so on. Throughout 14th and 15th century they are specifically mentioned as katun "Vlachs" or "Morlachs". They inhabited lands around Jezera, Prijepolje (1423), Bijela (1443). Some individual examples - Milcien Clapcich, Vlachus de Drobnach in 1390 committed to pay 12 perpers to Jakov Gundulić and Pribil Mirković for one horse which was sequestered in Jezera; Vlach Radivoje Vukšić from Drobnjaci, the head of a caravan, in 1423 was accused in Ragusa for the robbery of an Italian and had to pay 40 perpers; certain Vlachus Drobnach sequestered 3 rams in Jezera from a Ragusan; in 1454 kidnapped some escorts, similarly in 1456 kidnapped certain Ragusan young man who was sold to the Turks. In Herzegovina they served lords Sandalj Hranić Kosača and Stjepan Vukčić Kosača.

The tribe's first mention in the documents from Bay of Kotor are from the very end of 14th century. In the second half of 15th and 16th century there is no mention. In concern mostly are personal values and silverware, as well lead. They were not mentioned as Vlachs, beside Radmanus Pethcovich de Drobgnacis Vlachus in 1443, and certain morlachus money in concern of some necklace made in "sclavorum" way.

The oral tradition recorded by Luburić (1930) of the tribe in Montenegro preserved stories about fierce conflicts with the native tribe Kriči. In the first Kriči won, and to make peace Kriči voivode Kalok married daughter of knez Kosorić. However, after several years Drobnjaci generated another conflict and along Onogoštan people, Riđani and Banjani defeated them. Kriči reunited at Foča and attacked Drobnjaci, but again were defeated, and moved over the Tara river. The tradition that on the lands of Drobnjaci started the war against the Greeks probably is reminiscence of the Prince Stefan Vojislav against the Byzantine Empire.

In the defter of 1477, the Drobnjak had 636 households. In the defter was mentioned katun by voivode Herak Kovačev in nahija Komarnica.

=== 16th century ===
Brotherhoods began to be formed in Drobnjak only in the beginning of the 16th century.

In 1538, an Ottoman official in Bosnia, Husret Bey, attacked Drobnjak. He attacked again in 1541, in a battle in Mokro in which his forces were destroyed and he lost his life. Husret Bey is in fact historical figure of Gazi-Husrev Beg

In the late 16th century, Serbian monks Damjan and Pavle of Mileševa sent a letter to the Pope, explaining "what is Serbia", among dozens of clan territories, Drobnjaci were also mentioned among other old katuns.

The burning of Saint Sava's remains after the Banat Uprising (1594) provoked the Serbs in other regions to revolt against the Ottomans. Fights also broke out from Bar to Ulcinj, and in Bjelopavlići. In 1596, an uprising broke out in Bjelopavlići, then spread to Drobnjaci, Nikšić, Piva and Gacko (see Serb Uprising of 1596–97). It was suppressed due to lack of foreign support.

=== 17th and 18th centuries ===
On Đurđevdan 1605 the Drobnjaci defeated Ottomans in Bukovica, however, the same year they were forced to accept Ottoman rule. Drobnjak vojvoda Ivan Kaluđerović was forced to the Ottomans in Pljevlja, where he was murdered by Tataran-paša. In 1620, the knez of Drobnjaci, Sekula Cerović, participated in the assembly of Serb chieftains in Belgrade, regarding liberation actions in which he would take an important role.

The Drobnjaci, as other tribes of Montenegro, Brda, and Eastern Herzegovina, joined Venice in the Cretan War. Drobnjak vojvoda Pavle Abazović fell in Piva in 1646, in a battle which is said to have taken three hundred Drobnjak lives. In 1649, knez Ilija Balotić with the Drobnjaci and other Herzegovinian tribes took over Risak and handed it over to Venice. In 1658 Herzegovinian chieftains requested that the Venetians dispatch to them as soon as possible. In 1662, the sanjak-bey of Herzegovina called 57 chieftains from Nikšić, Piva, Drobnjak and Morača, to come to Kolašin, where he killed them all, on the Grand Vizier's order due to cooperation with Venice. It is believed that during the Cretan War, in which the Drobnjaci supported Venice against the Ottomans, and the partially Islamized Kriči supported the Ottomans, the two tribes came into conflict. The Drobnjaci defeated the Kriči, and killed their vojvoda, and pushed them from the left to the right side of the Tara. The Drobnjaci now held Jezera. In 1664 Evliya Çelebi recounted that Sohrab Mehmed Pasha attacked nahija Drobnjaci, and although they captured a lot of people, Drobnjaci killed over 100 Pasha's soldiers.

The Vulovići, Đurđići, Kosorići, Tomići and Cerovići settled in the Drobnjak county in the 17th century, originally from Banjani. In 1694, Serb Uskoks, driven out by the Turks from Albania, settled in Drobnjak county.

According to folklore the Drobnjak vojvoda Staniša went to the Pasha of Scutari, Mahmud Pasha, and received the voivodeship of the Sanjak of Herzegovina and the alaj-barjak of Herzegovina for the Drobnjak tribe, in ca. 1778. In the 1780s he was murdered by the Ottomans after being deemed uncertain and unreliable to Ottoman rule.

In 1789, Ivan Radonjić, the governor of Montenegro, wrote for the second time to the Empress of Russia: "Now, all of us Serbs from Montenegro, Herzegovina, Banjani, Drobnjaci, Kuči, Piperi, Bjelopavlići, Zeta, Klimenti, Vasojevići, Bratonožići, Peć, Kosovo, Prizren, Albania, Macedonia belong to your Excellency and pray that you, as our kind mother, send over Prince Sofronije Jugović."

=== 19th century ===
After Karađorđe Petrović was chosen as leader of the uprising in the Smederevo Sanjak (1804), smaller uprisings also broke out in Drobnjaci (1805), Rovca and Morača.

Under Prince Nicholas I of Montenegro and the Congress of Berlin recognition (1878), the tribes of Piva, Banjani, Nikšići, Šaranci, Drobnjaci and a large number of the Rudinjani formed the Old Herzegovina region of the new Montenegrin state.

==== Conflict with the Čengić lords ====
Smail-aga Čengić, an Ottoman feudal lord, fought frequently with the Drobnjaci clan, and in letters of Njegoš in 1839 it is known that Rustem-Aga, the son of Smail, had often raped local women of the Drobnjaci and Pivljani. The Drobnjaci had enough of the violations of their women, and approached Petar II Njegoš (who had lost eight family members in the Battle of Grahovo), organizing a plot against the Ottoman lords, planning to first kill Smail. The main conspirators were Novica Cerović and Đoko Malović. Podmalinsko Monastery was gathering place for members of Drobnjaci tribe who traditionally held meetings there, last time in 1840 to decide to kill Smail-aga Čengić. They started by asking Smail to collect the taxes himself, and in September 1840 the Aga is putting up his tent at Mljetičak, in eastern Drobnjaci. In the night, the force attacks the camp and Smail and a number of Turks are killed. The circumstances are mentioned in a letter to the Russian consul in Dubrovnik: "The notorious criminal, Smail-aga Cengic, the musselim of Gacko, Pljevlja, Kolašin and Drobnjaci, attacked our frontier regions with several thousand men almost every year. This year too he pitched his tent three hours away from our border, and started collecting troops to invade our tribe of the Morača. Our men found out about his evil intention earlier, and gathered about 300–400 men, and they attacked his tent on the morning of 23 September, cut down the Aga himself and about 40 of his like-minded criminals... This prominent person was more important in these regions that any of the viziers." The events are richly attested in Serb epic poetry.

=== 20th century ===
The Drobnjaci supported the White List at the Podgorica Assembly p. 285

In 1927, Drobnjaci had 40 settlements of 2,200 houses with 14,000–15,000 inhabitants. The capital was Šavnik.

On 1 April 1945, over thirty conspirators were executed in Šavnik, of whom a large number were of the Karadžići.

== Brotherhoods and families ==
In anthropological studies, the brotherhoods (bratstva) of Drobnjak are divided into either Novljani, Useljenici, Uskoci, and displaced families; or Starinci, Novljani, Useljenici, Uskoci (further divided into Šaranci and Uskoci), and emigrant families.

- The Starinci ("natives") who settled prior to the 16th century, today number 57 families, with Mandić being the oldest.
- The Novljani, today number 113 families.
- The Useljenici, today number 119 families.
- The Šaranci who settled in the second half of the 17th century, today number 44 families.
- The Uskoci, who settled lastly, from the Nikšić area, today number 52 families.

The most notable brotherhoods (bratstva) of the clan are the Abazović, Šljivančanin, Cerović, Karadžić, Malović, Čupić, Kosorić, Jauković and Zarubica families. The brotherhoods of Vulovići, Đurđići, Kosorići, Tomići and Cerovići, were established when they settled in the Drobnjak from Banjani in the 17th century. The clan was originally formed by five related brotherhoods: Cerović, Đurđić, Kosorić, Tomić and Vulović (of whom are the Žugićs). The Drobnjaci are Orthodox in majority, the notably mixed Muslim/Serb family is Kalabić, the Muslim families are Selimović and Džigal.

- Abazović
- Barać
- Brajković
- Cerović
- Čupić
- Drobnjak
- Đukić
- Đurđić
- Đurđević
- Jotić
- Jakić
- Jauković
- Jakšić
- Kankaraš
- Parušić
- Pavićević
- Karadžić
- Kosorić
- Malović
- Mandić, starinci, tribe's oldest family, originate from Old Serb Milešević.
- Memedović
- Ninković
- Novaković
- Radojević
- Tomić
- Vemić
- Vujović
- Sadiković
  - Selimović
  - Ovčine
- Džigal
- Kalabić
- Osmanović
- Grbović
- Janjić
- Janković
- Lasica

The Uskoci and Šaranci clans are also regarded as part of, or kin to, the Drobnjaci.

== Notable people ==
People from Drobnjaci

- Novica Cerović (1805–1895), warrior, senator and Drobnjak chief; born in Tušina, Šavnik

By ancestry

- Mladen Milovanović (c. 1760–1823), one of the leaders in the First Serbian Uprising; father fled Tušina after a blood feud
- Veselin Šljivančanin (born 1953), Yugoslav officer and war criminal; born in Palež, Žabljak
- Radovan Karadžić (born 1945), former president of the self-proclaimed Serbian Republic of Bosnia and Herzegovina and a convicted war criminal; born in Petnjica, Šavnik
- Vuk Karadžić (1787–1864), Serbian philologist, anthropologist and linguist; parents from Drobnjaci
- Jovan Kursula (1768–1813), Serbian vojvoda (commander) from First Serbian Uprising; parents from Drobnjaci
- Žarko Laušević (1960-2023), Serbian and Montenegrin actor; father from Tepca, Žabljak

== See also ==
- Montenegrin clans
