= Brajkovići =

Brajkovići may refer to:

- Brajkovići, Foča, Bosnia and Herzegovina
- Brajkovići, Travnik, Bosnia and Herzegovina
- Brajkovići (Kanfanar), Croatia
- Brajkovići, Pazin, Croatia
- Brajkovići, Kosjerić, Serbia

== See also ==
- Brajković, surname
- Brajkovac (disambiguation)
- Brajići (disambiguation)
