= 2006–07 AZAL PFC season =

Olimpik Baku
2006–07 season
- Chairman: Rasul Rasulov
- Manager: Asgar Abdullayev
- Stadium: Shafa Stadium
- Premier League: 6th
- Azerbaijan Cup: Round of 16 vs Turan Tovuz
- Top goalscorer: Khagani Mammadov (13)
Home colours	Away colours

The Olimpik Baku 2006–07 season was Olimpik Baku's second Azerbaijan Premier League season and their first season with Asgar Abdullayev as manager. They participated in the 2006–07 Azerbaijan Top League as well as the 2006–07 Azerbaijan Cup, finishing the league in 6th and reaching the Last 16 stage of the cup where they were eliminated by Turan Tovuz.

== Squad ==
Note: Flags indicate national team as defined under FIFA eligibility rules; some limited exceptions apply. Players may hold more than one non-FIFA nationality.

No.	Pos.	Nation	Player
—	GK	(Azerbaijan) AZE	Rauf Mehdiyev
—	GK	(Azerbaijan) AZE	Ruslan Guliev
—	GK	(Azerbaijan) AZE	Vagif Shirinbayov
—	DF	(Azerbaijan) AZE	Emin Agaev
—	DF	(Azerbaijan) AZE	Tarlan Ahmadov
—	DF	(Azerbaijan) AZE	Elvin Aliyev
—	DF	(Azerbaijan) AZE	Mixail Kitelman
—	DF	(Azerbaijan) AZE	Agil Nabiyev
—	DF	(Nigeria) NGA	Nduka Usim
—	DF	(Serbia) SRB	Dragan Mandic
—	MF	(Azerbaijan) AZE	Yashar Abuzerov
—	MF	(Azerbaijan) AZE	Namiq Əliyev
—	MF	(Brazil) BRA	Fábio

No.	Pos.	Nation	Player
—	MF	(Azerbaijan) AZE	Nizami Hajiyev
—	MF	(Azerbaijan) AZE	Ruslan Musayev
—	MF	(Azerbaijan) AZE	Vidadi Rzayev
—	MF	(Azerbaijan) AZE	Səbuhi Sadiqov
—	FW	(Niger) NIG	Ghani Animofoshe
—	FW	(Azerbaijan) AZE	Nəriman Əzimov
—	FW	(Guinea) GUI	Pathé Bangoura
—	FW	(Serbia) SRB	Jovan Drobnjak
—	FW	(Azerbaijan) AZE	Vüsal Hüseynov
—	FW	(Azerbaijan) AZE	Khagani Mammadov
—	FW	(Republic of the Congo) CGO	Mwanza Muteba
—	FW	(Azerbaijan) AZE	Etimad Qurbanov
—	FW	(Azerbaijan) AZE	Vadim Vasilyev

== Transfers ==
=== Summer ===
In: Note: Flags indicate national team as defined under FIFA eligibility rules; some limited exceptions apply. Players may hold more than one non-FIFA nationality.

No.	Pos.	Nation	Player
—	GK	(Azerbaijan) AZE	Khayal Zeynalov (from (Azerbaijan) Kapaz)
—	GK	(Azerbaijan) AZE	Ruslan Guliev (from (Azerbaijan) Shahdag)
—	GK	(Azerbaijan) AZE	Rauf Mehdiyev (from (Azerbaijan) Baku)
—	DF	(Azerbaijan) AZE	Emin Agaev (from (Russia) Nosta Novotroitsk)
—	DF	(Azerbaijan) AZE	Tarlan Ahmadov (from (Azerbaijan) Karvan)
—	DF	(Azerbaijan) AZE	Elvin Aliyev (from (Azerbaijan) Neftchi Baku)
—	DF	(Azerbaijan) AZE	Agil Nabiyev (from (Azerbaijan) Turan Tovuz)
—	DF	(Serbia) SRB	Dragan Mandic (from (Serbia) Vojvodina Novi Sad)
—	MF	(Azerbaijan) AZE	Yashar Abuzerov (from (Azerbaijan) Baku)
—	MF	(Azerbaijan) AZE	Ruslan Musayev (from (Azerbaijan) Baku)
—	FW	(Azerbaijan) AZE	Khagani Mammadov (from (Azerbaijan) Khazar Lankaran)
—	FW	(Azerbaijan) AZE	Vadim Vasilyev (from (Azerbaijan) Baku)
—	FW	(Republic of the Congo) CGO	Mwanza Muteba (from (Azerbaijan) MKT Araz)
—	FW	(Niger) NIG	Ghani Animofoshe (from (Azerbaijan) Göyazan Qazax)
—	FW	(Serbia) SRB	Jovan Drobnjak (from (Albania) Vllaznia Shkodër)

Out: Note: Flags indicate national team as defined under FIFA eligibility rules; some limited exceptions apply. Players may hold more than one non-FIFA nationality.

No.	Pos.	Nation	Player
—	GK	(Azerbaijan) AZE	Amil Agajanov (to (Azerbaijan) Turan Tovuz)
—	GK	(Azerbaijan) AZE	Huseyn Mahammadov (to (Azerbaijan) Karvan)
—	GK	(Azerbaijan) AZE	Vaqif Sjirinbäjov (to (Azerbaijan) Inter Baku)
—	DF	(Azerbaijan) AZE	Khayal Mustafayev (to (Azerbaijan) Inter Baku)
—	DF	(Azerbaijan) AZE	Şəhruz Mustafayev (to (Azerbaijan) Gabala)
—	DF	(Azerbaijan) AZE	Əfqan Nağıyev
—	DF	(Azerbaijan) AZE	Vüqar Quliyev (to (Azerbaijan) Baku)
—	DF	(Azerbaijan) AZE	Əhməd Qurbanov (to (Azerbaijan) MKT Araz)
—	DF	(Russia) RUS	Nurməhəmməd Murtuzəliyev
—	DF	(Serbia) SRB	Rašo Babić (to (Serbia) Banat Zrenjanin)
—	DF	(Serbia) SRB	Dalibor Dragić (to (Serbia) Banat Zrenjanin)
—	MF	(Azerbaijan) AZE	Elnur Abdullayev (loan return to (Azerbaijan) Baku)
—	MF	(Azerbaijan) AZE	Zaur İsmayılov
—	MF	(Azerbaijan) AZE	Emil Kitelman
—	MF	(Azerbaijan) AZE	Elmir Aliev (to (Azerbaijan) Gabala)
—	MF	(Azerbaijan) AZE	Samir Mütəllimov
—	MF	(Azerbaijan) AZE	Təhmuraz Rzayev
—	MF	(Azerbaijan) AZE	Səbuhi Sadiqov
—	MF	(Azerbaijan) AZE	Yusif Şamilov
—	MF	(Azerbaijan) AZE	Anar Vəliyev (to (Azerbaijan) Gabala)
—	MF	(Croatia) CRO	Domoqoy Kosiç
—	MF	(Croatia) CRO	Boşko Peraitsa
—	MF	(Serbia) SRB	Marko Mitrović (to (Serbia) Banat Zrenjanin)
—	MF	(Turkey) TUR	Abdulkadir Öz
—	FW	(Azerbaijan) AZE	Daniel Akhtyamov (to (Azerbaijan) Inter Baku)
—	FW	(Serbia) SRB	Mirko Babiç
—	FW	(Serbia) SRB	Srđan Baljak (to (Serbia) Banat Zrenjanin)
—	FW	(Serbia) SRB	Saša Kovačević (to (Serbia) Hajduk Beograd)

=== Winter ===
In: Note: Flags indicate national team as defined under FIFA eligibility rules; some limited exceptions apply. Players may hold more than one non-FIFA nationality.

No.	Pos.	Nation	Player
—	MF	(Brazil) BRA	Fábio (from (Azerbaijan) MKT Araz)
—	FW	(Guinea) GUI	Pathé Bangoura (from (Azerbaijan) Baku)

Out: Note: Flags indicate national team as defined under FIFA eligibility rules; some limited exceptions apply. Players may hold more than one non-FIFA nationality.

No.	Pos.	Nation	Player
—	GK	(Azerbaijan) AZE	Khayal Zeynalov (to (Azerbaijan) Gabala)

== Competitions ==
=== Azerbaijan Premier League ===
==== Results ====
5 August 2006 1	Baku	1 – 0	Olimpik Baku	Baku
	Andrezinho 70'	[ Summary]		Stadium: Tofig Bakhramov Stadium

21 August 2006 3	Olimpik Baku	1 – 0	Turan Tovuz	Baku
	Ahmadov 87'	[ Summary]		Stadium: Shafa Stadium

26 August 2006 4	Gänclärbirliyi Sumqayit	1 – 1	Olimpik Baku	Sumgayit
	Nikiema 53'	[ Summary]	Mammadov 5'	Stadium: Mehdi Huseynzade Stadium

31 August 2006 2	Karvan	1 – 0	Olimpik Baku	Yevlakh
	Mirzaev 90'	[ Summary]		Stadium: Yevlakh City Stadium

17 September 2006 5	Olimpik Baku	1 – 2	Khazar Lankaran	Baku
	Muteba 52'	[ Summary]	Nadirov 32'; Gurbanov 36'	Stadium: Shafa Stadium; Attendance: 800

23 September 2006 6	Inter Baku	0 – 0	Olimpik Baku	Baku
		[ Summary]		Stadium: Shafa Stadium

30 September 2006 7	Olimpik Baku	1 – 0	MKT-Araz	Baku
	Mammadov 79'	[ Summary]		Stadium: Shafa Stadium; Attendance: 500

23 October 2006 8	Qarabağ	1 – 1	Olimpik Baku	Baku
	Huseynov 9'	[ Summary]	Muteba 57'	Stadium: Tofik Bakhramov Stadium^{2}

3 November 2006 10	Gabala	0 – 3	Olimpik Baku	Qabala
		[ Summary]	Mammadov 35'; Drobnjak 40'; Rzayev 87'	Stadium: Gabala City Stadium; Attendance: 500

27 November 2006 11	Neftchi Baku	3 – 0	Olimpik Baku	Baku
	Ismayilov 27'; Näbiyev 44'; Adamia 72'	[ Summary]		Stadium: Tofik Bakhramov Stadium

8 December 2006 12	Olimpik Baku	3 – 0	Simurq	Baku
	Rzayev 54'; Mammadov 66', 88'	[ Summary]		Stadium: Shafa Stadium; Attendance: 200

13 December 2006 9	Olimpik Baku	3 – 1	Shahdag	Baku
	Mammadov 59', 66', 88'	[ Summary]	Tijani 15'	Stadium: Shafa Stadium; Attendance: 400

11 February 2007 13	Olimpik Baku	0 – 0	Baku	Baku
		[ Summary]		Stadium: Shafa Stadium; Attendance: 700

17 February 2007 14	Olimpik Baku	1 – 0	Karvan	Baku
	Hajiyev 14'	[ Summary]		Stadium: Shafa Stadium; Attendance: 450

22 February 2007 15	Turan Tovuz	0 – 1	Olimpik Baku	Tovuz
		[ Summary]	Fábio 82'	Stadium: Tovuz City Stadium; Attendance: 400

17 March 2007 16	Olimpik Baku	2 – 0	Gänclärbirliyi Sumqayit	Baku
	Hajiyev 2'; Bangoura 65'	[ Summary]		Stadium: Shafa Stadium; Attendance: 180

2 April 2007 17	MKT-Araz	0 – 0	Olimpik Baku	Imishli
		[ Summary]		Stadium: Heydar Aliyev Stadium

8 April 2007 18	Olimpik Baku	0 – 0	Qarabağ	Baku
		[ Summary]		Stadium: Shafa Stadium

17 April 2007 19	Şahdağ	0 – 0	Olimpik Baku	Qusar
		[ Summary]		Stadium: Şövkət Orduxanov Stadium; Attendance: 300

27 April 2007 20	Khazar Lankaran	3 – 2	Olimpik Baku	Lankaran
	Quliyev 41', 76'; Ramazanov 45+1' (pen.)	[ Summary]	Mammadov 9'; Fábio 43'	Stadium: Lankaran City Stadium; Attendance: 9,000

2 May 2007 21	Olimpik Baku	3 – 1	Gabala	Baku
	Mammadov 25'; Bangoura 27'; Äliyev 62'	[ Summary]	Balamestny 33'	Stadium: Shafa Stadium; Attendance: 400

12 May 2007 22	Olimpik Baku	1 – 0	Inter Baku	Baku
	Fábio 55'	[ Summary]		Stadium: Shafa Stadium; Attendance: 200

17 May 2007 23	Olimpik Baku	2 – 1	Neftchi Baku	Baku
	Bangoura 63'; Mammadov 66'	[ Summary]	Sadygov 11' (pen.)	Stadium: Shafa Stadium; Attendance: 3,000

23 May 2007 24	Simurq	2 – 2	Olimpik Baku	Zaqatala
	Nasibov 49', 69'	[ Summary]	Mammadov 55', 80'	Stadium: Zaqatala City Stadium; Attendance: 400

==== Table ====
Pos	Team	Pld	W	D	L	GF	GA	GD	Pts	Qualification or relegation
4	Inter Baku	24	13	6	5	36	12	+24	45	
5	FK MKT-Araz	24	12	5	7	23	18	+5	41	Qualification for UEFA Cup first qualifying round (Note: MKT-Araz qualified for the first qualifying round of the 2005–06 UEFA Cup as winner of the 2004–05 Azerbaijan Cup.)
6	Olimpik Baku	24	11	8	5	28	17	+11	41	
7	Karvan	24	10	5	9	36	30	+6	35	
8	Qarabağ	24	6	9	9	20	27	−7	27	

Source: Azerbaijan Professional Football league

=== Azerbaijan Cup ===
11 September 2006 First Round 1st leg	Khazar Lankaran-2	0 – 2	Olimpik Baku	Lankaran
AZT (UTC+4)		[ Summary]	Drobnjak 71'; Mammadov 75'	Stadium: Lankaran City Stadium

17 October 2006 First Round 2nd leg	Olimpik Baku	7 – 2 (9 – 3 agg.)	Khazar Lankaran-2	Baku
AZT (UTC+4)		[ Summary]		Stadium: Shafa Stadium

21 November 2006 Last 16 1st leg	Turan Tovuz	2 – 0	Olimpik Baku	Tovuz
AZT (UTC+4)	V.Fərhadov 45+1'; A.Qadiri 78'	Summary		Stadium: Tovuz City Stadium; Attendance: 500

3 December 2006 Last 16 2nd leg	Olimpik Baku	1 – 0 (1 – 2 agg.)	Turan Tovuz	Baku
AZT (UTC+4)	Abuzerov 62'	Summary		Stadium: Shafa Stadium; Attendance: 300

== Squad statistics ==
=== Appearances and goals ===
No.	Pos	Nat	Player	Total		Premier League		Azerbaijan Cup	
No.	Pos	Nat	Player	Apps	Goals	Apps	Goals	Apps	Goals
	GK	(Azerbaijan) AZE	Rauf Mehdiyev	23	0	23	0	0	0
	DF	(Azerbaijan) AZE	Emin Agaev	6	0	6	0	0	0
	DF	(Azerbaijan) AZE	Tarlan Ahmadov	23	1	23	1	0	0
	DF	(Azerbaijan) AZE	Elvin Aliyev	20	0	20	0	0	0
	DF	(Azerbaijan) AZE	Mixail Kitelman	3	0	3	0	0	0
	DF	(Serbia) SRB	Dragan Mandic	18	0	18	0	0	0
	DF	(Azerbaijan) AZE	Agil Nabiyev	10	0	10	0	0	0
	DF	(Nigeria) NGA	Usim Nduka	22	0	22	0	0	0
	MF	(Azerbaijan) AZE	Yashar Abuzerov	21	0	21	0	0	0
	MF	(Azerbaijan) AZE	Namiq Əliyev	16	1	16	1	0	0
	MF	(Brazil) BRA	Fábio	12	3	12	3	0	0
	MF	(Azerbaijan) AZE	Nizami Hajiyev	21	2	21	2	0	0
	MF	(Azerbaijan) AZE	Ruslan Musayev	5	0	5	0	0	0
	MF	(Azerbaijan) AZE	Vidadi Rzayev	18	2	18	2	0	0
	MF	(Azerbaijan) AZE	Səbuhi Sadiqov	2	0	2	0	0	0
	FW	(Niger) NIG	Ghani Animofoshe	2	0	2	0	0	0
	FW	(Azerbaijan) AZE	Nəriman Əzimov	2	0	2	0	0	0
	FW	(Guinea) GUI	Pathé Bangoura	12	3	12	3	0	0
	FW	(Serbia) SRB	Jovan Drobnjak	13	1	13	1	0	0
	FW	(Azerbaijan) AZE	Vüsal Hüseynov	15	0	15	0	0	0
	FW	(Azerbaijan) AZE	Khagani Mammadov	23	13	23	13	0	0
	FW	(Republic of the Congo) CGO	Mwanza Muteba	14	2	14	2	0	0
	FW	(Azerbaijan) AZE	Etimad Qurbanov	5	0	5	0	0	0
	FW	(Azerbaijan) AZE	Vadim Vasilyev	9	0	9	0	0	0
Players who appeared for Olimpik Baku and left during the season:
	GK	(Azerbaijan) AZE	Khayal Zeynalov	1	0	1	0	0	0

=== Goal scorers ===
Place	Position	Nation	Number	Name	Premier League	Azerbaijan Cup	Total
1	FW	(Azerbaijan)		Khagani Mammadov	13	1	14
2	MF	(Brazil)		Fábio	3	0	3
2	FW	(Guinea)		Pathé Bangoura	3	0	3
4	MF	(Azerbaijan)		Nizami Hajiyev	2	0	2
4	MF	(Azerbaijan)		Vidadi Rzayev	2	0	2
4	FW	(Republic of the Congo)		Mwanza Muteba	2	0	2
4	FW	(Serbia)		Jovan Drobnjak	1	1	1
8	DF	(Azerbaijan)		Tarlan Ahmadov	1	0	1
8	MF	(Azerbaijan)		Namiq Əliyev	1	0	1
8	MF	(Azerbaijan)		Yashar Abuzerov	0	1	1
				Unknown	0	7	7
				TOTALS	28	10	38

== Notes ==
- Qarabağ have played their home games at the Tofiq Bahramov Stadium since 1993 due to the ongoing situation in Quzanlı.
