= Adrijan Sarajlija =

Serbian writer (born 1976)

Adrijan Sarajlija Адријан Сарајлија
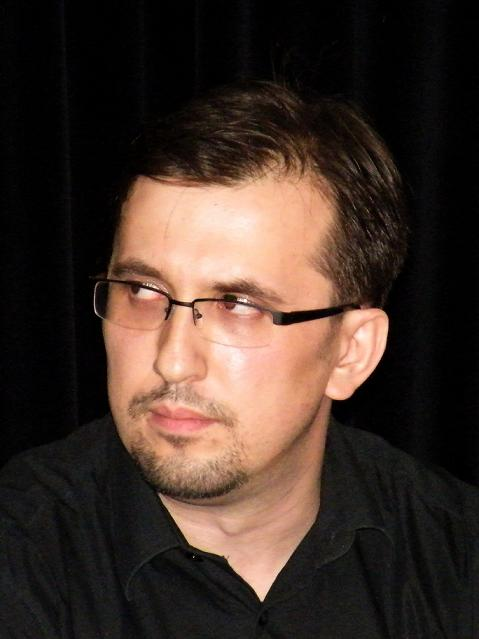
- Born: 6 April 1976 (age 50); Zvornik, Bosnia and Herzegovina Yugoslavia
- Education: University of Belgrade Faculty of Medicine
- Occupations: medicine, medical sciences, literature
- Years active: 2007–

Adrijan Sarajlija (born 6 April 1976) is a Serbian writer, physician and medical scientist. He is known in region of former Yugoslavia for his short speculative fiction stories and his SF novel A Mirror for the Vampire /Ogledalo za vampira/. He completed the First Belgrade High School and graduated from the Faculty of Medicine in Belgrade.

Sarajlija is part of the Signalism international art movement. He is a member of the Association of Writers of Serbia. He is married, lives and works in Belgrade.

== Works ==
Adrijan Sarajlija's short stories have been published in a number of national and Balkan anthologies, such as: Best of Umbrella 1 (Best of Kišobran, 2008), White Noise (Beli šum, 2008), City Stories 3 – Fantasy (Gradske priče 3 – Fantastika, 2008), True Lies (Istinite laži, 2009), City Stories 4 – Watermill (Gradske priče 4 – Vodenica, 2009), Best of Umbrella 2 (Best of Kišobran 2, 2010), Paracosmos (Parasvemir, 2010), Phan(tom) (Fan(tom), 2010). He has also been featured in the Emitor prozine and on the regional websites Art-Anima and Umbrella.

He is the author of the short stories collection Manufactory G (Manufaktura G, 2010), the novel The Mirror for the Vampire (Ogledalo za vampira, 2012) and the collection Naked Voices (Goli glasovi, 2017). Manufactory G contains nine genre-heterogeneous stories ranging from science fiction, through horror to magical realism. According to critics, among the stories stands out the most ambitious and the longest – Everything that grows /Sve što raste/, a striking and creepy picture of a world-destroying monster.

The novel A Mirror for the Vampire follows the fate of Eduardo, a frustrated professor of history at a private high school in Brazil. Enchanted by vampire mythology, Eduardo decides to use the advances of modern medicine to become as close to his dark patterns as possible, and to seek revenge on those who have done him harm.

== Critical reception ==
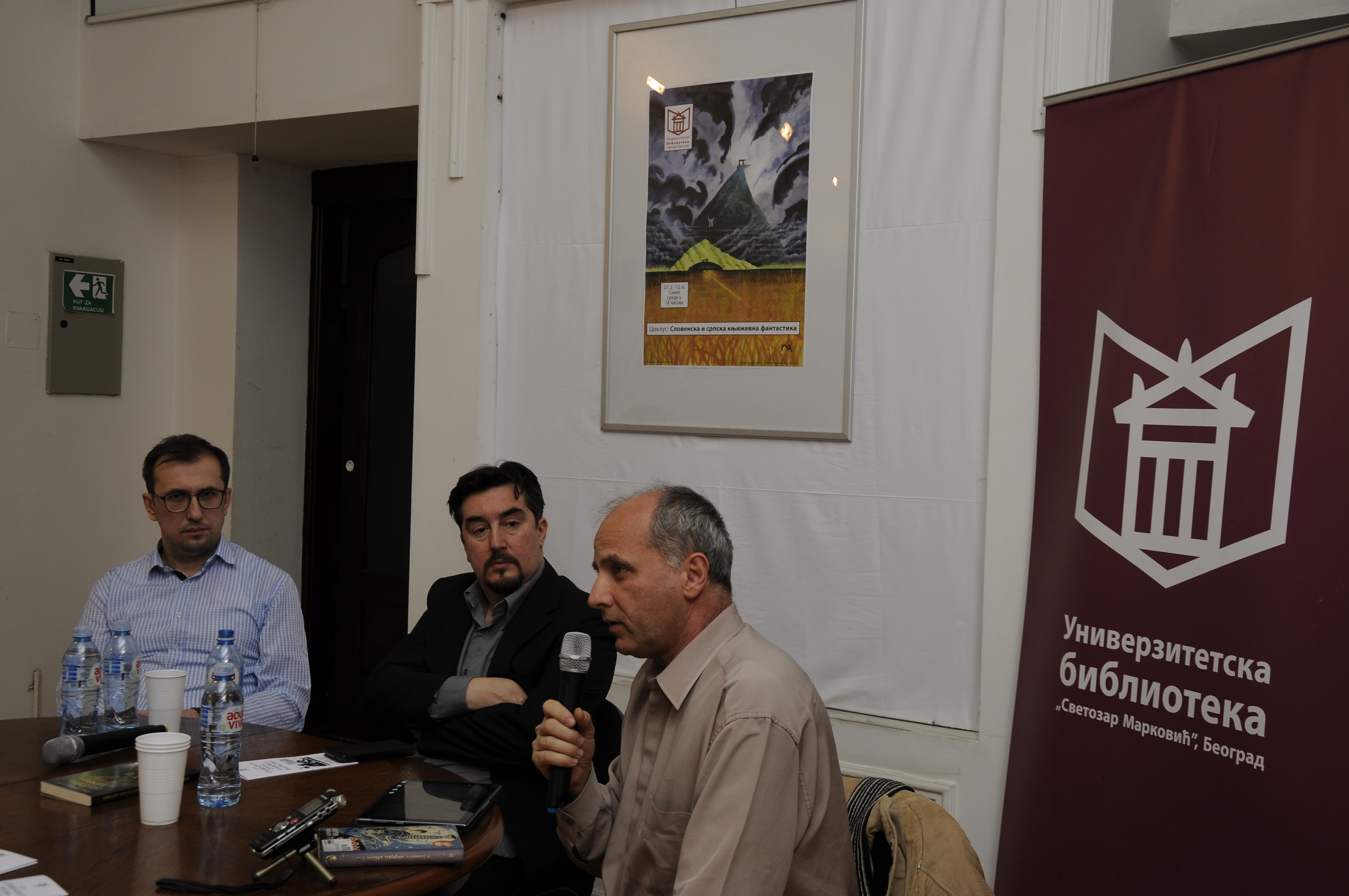
A panel discussion about Sarajlija's work – Adrijan Sarajlija, Zoran Stefanović and Prof. Dejan Ajdačić, Belgrade University Library, Ciklus Slovenska i srpska fantastika /Slavic and Serbian fantasy cycle/, University library, Belgrade, Serbia 13 March 2019.

Belgrade critic and editor Miloš Cvetković described the first book as following: "Manufactory G is the debut collection of Adrijan Sarajlija; it consists of nine obviously carefully chosen stories that span a diverse genre ranging from science fiction, horror, steampunk, to western... All the stories in the collection are carefully crafted and while Sarailija is obviously still looking for her own voice and is experimenting with form and content a lot, what is constant for all stories is his dedication to detail, safe storytelling and great richness of ideas."

Istrian Croatian critic Davor Šišović recommended the collection in the Voice of Istria: "Style equal to the classics of magical realism, but also to the Andrić-Selimović style of storytelling, very natural dialogues, extremely artful atmosphere, layered characters, but also ruthlessness to their destinies, these are just some of the characteristics. Sarajlija's prose."

Eminent Serbian writer and critic Ilija Bakić wrote about the novel The mirror for the vampire: "Adrijan Sarajlija's novel is an unrestrained, perspicacious and witty narrative that confirms author's notable place among the younger Serbian fiction writers deserved by the collection of Manufactures G. "

In a cultural supplement to the eminent Politika newspaper, 16 June 2012, an extensive review of Sarajlija's novel was signed by political scientist Prof. Alexander L. Jugović, one of the leading Serbian theorists of social deviance. He writes: "Using horror, the author tells us that sex, power, and media fame are the key values of a spectacle society... Sarajlija uses the metamorphosis of Professor Eduard into a vampire ("vampirinho") to show us the fears of a man living in modern society: because of belonging, social status, sexual orientation, health…. His hero is the paradigm of a confused, marginalized and unhappy man in a time of media consumerism."

On 29 June 2012, in a review for the Popboks site, Belgrade critic Đorđe Bajić wrote: "Some readers may be rejected by some overly explicit descriptions, but it should be borne in mind that they are the means by which Sarajlija achieves its goal – the grotesque realism of the Rabble type."

Istrian writer Saša Šebelić says: "Despite what the title suggests, it is not a horror genre, but pure speculative fiction, in which the author summarizes and describes, without condemning, not disgusting, the vices of modern, hybrid times, decadence and amorality who as a patina has settled in this world and is all around us, not bypassing even professions that are expected to have at least a minimum of ethics."

The poet and prose writer Slobodan Škerović wrote about Sarajlija's novel: "The extraordinarily rich, exotic and receptible scenery is imbued with the carnival-like, unbridled humor that Sarajlija's grotesques speak. In this debut novel, the eloquence, insight and mastery of Adrijan Sarajlija came to the fore. The funny side of the vampire world is violently colliding with the dark and cruel reality of Brazil's carnal passions and their consequent bizarre modi vivendi, leading to the bursting of human forms into jungle beings of a different kind, more destructive and unpredictable than the real Amazonia."

The novel A Mirror for the Vampire has been shortlisted for the NIN Award, the main literary award in former Yugoslavia.

== Bibliography ==
Novels

- A Mirror for the Vampire (Ogledalo za vampira, author's publication, 2012; Čarobna knjiga, 2013).

Prose Collections

- Manufactory G (Manufaktura G, "Tardis", 2010).
- Naked Voices (Goli glasovi, "Everest media", 2017)

Anthologies and Group Collections

- Chronovision /Hronovizija/ in the White Noise: An Anthology of Television Stories /Beli šum: Antologija priča o televiziji/, edited by Goran Skrobonja, Paladin (Fraktali Library), 2008.
- Abrakadabra in True Lies: Urban Legends Stories /Istinite laži: Priče o urbanim legendama/, edited by Goran Skrobonja, Paladin (Fraktals Library), 2009.
- Berlin Bob in Apocalypse yesterday, today, tomorrow /Apokalipsa juče, danas, sutra/, edited by Goran Skrobonja, Paladin (Fraktali Library), 2011.
- Wasserkrabbe in the Paracosmos /Parasvemir/ Anthology, edited by Tatjana Jambrišak and Darko Vrban, Mentor, Zagreb, 2010.
- A Letter /Pismo/ in Dark, ebonite matter /Tamna, tmasta tvar/, edited by Tatjana Jambrišak, Darko Vrban and Ivana Delač, Mentor, Zagreb, 2013.
