= Drobnjak =

Drobnjak is a Souts Slavic surname. Notable people with the surname include:

- Anto Drobnjak, Montenegrin football player
- Branislav Drobnjak, Montenegrin football player
- Dragiša Drobnjak, Slovenian basketball player
- Jovan Drobnjak (born 1974), Montenegrin footballer
- Luka Drobnjak, Serbian footballer
- Marko Drobnjak (born 1995), Serbian footballer
- Predrag Drobnjak, Montenegrin basketball player
- Vladimir Drobnjak, Croatian diplomat

== See also ==
- Drobnjak, Montenegro, a region in Montenegro
- Serbian name for Dromjak, a village in Hani i Elezit, Kosovo
