= Cerović =

Cerović (Serbian: Церовић) is a surname. Notable people with the surname include:

- Ivan Cerović (born 1982), Croatian tennis player
- Miloš Cerović (born 1980), Serbian swimmer
- Novica Cerović (1805–1895), Montenegrin noble
- Srđan Cerović (born 1971), Serbian footballer and manager
- Stojan Cerović (1949–2005), Serbian journalist
