= The Death of Smail-aga Čengić =

1846 epic poem by Ivan Mažuranić

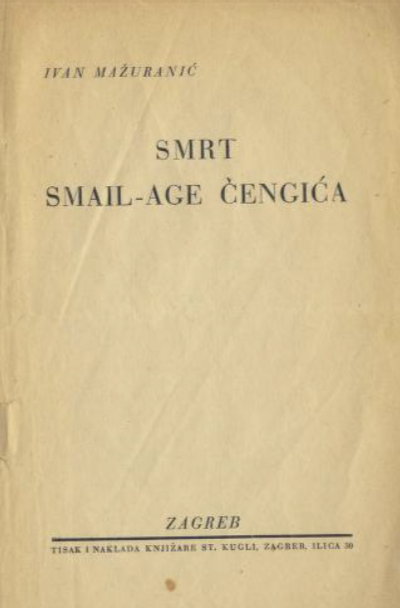
- Author: Ivan Mažuranić
- Original title: Smrt Smail-age Čengića
- Language: Croatian
- Genre: Epic poem
- Publication date: 1846
- Publication place: Austrian Empire
- Media type: Print

The Death of Smail-aga Čengić (Croatian: Smrt Smail-age Čengića) is an epic poem by Croatian poet and later Ban of Croatia Ivan Mažuranić during 1845 and first published in the almanac Iskra for 1846. It is based on the real events of the murder of Bosnian Ottoman army general (aga) Smail-aga Čengić by Montenegrin vojvoda Novica Cerović in 1840. In the poem, Smail-aga is famous for his bravery, but disparaged for his truculence; the main motif is his death, happening after he engages in a battle against the Herzegovinian Montenegrins.

The poem was initially ordered by Dimitrija Demeter. It is divided in five sections and contains exactly 1134 verses.

== Synopsis ==
The poem is divided into five sections: Smail-aga's Display of Power (Croatian: Agovanje), The Night Traveller (Noćnik), A Company (Četa), A Tribute (Harač) and Doom (Kob).

=== Display of Power (Agovanje) ===
Smail-aga rules from his fort in Stolac in Herzegovina. He calls his servants to gather the Highlanders he had recently captured near the river Morača. He also brings out Durak, an old man who advised him to release his prisoners, fearing a reprisal from the Orthodox population ("Vlachs") if he were to execute them.

He threatens his prisoners before killing them, but the Montenegrins remain silent as they are being executed by impalement, hanging, and beheading. Young Turks spectate and are pleased, while older Turks anticipate reprisals and are silent with fear. Smail-aga is disheartened by and in awe of the fact that his prisoners retained composure.

In a moment of awe and fury, he lashes out on Durak for advising him against his brutal ways, and threatens to hang him in front of his son, Novica. Durak and Novica plead for Durak's life, but Smail-aga proceeds to hang him regardless.

=== The Night Traveller (Noćnik) ===
Novica travels by night towards Cetinje, knowing that he could not get through Montenegro alive in broad daylight, since he participated in battles against them with Smail-aga. He passes through Cuce, Bjelice and Ćeklići, and reaches the guards of Cetinje.

Novica introduces himself as a fighter from Tušina, a village under Durmitor mountain, desperate after Čengić killed his compatriots from Morača and his father, and looking for revenge. The guards allow him to pass after disarming him.

=== A Company (Četa) ===
A company of hajduks moves from Cetinje to Morača, passing through Zagarač, Bjelopavlići and Rovca. They move silently led by Mirko.

The company sits down to rest by the Morača river. As shepherds start to return their sheep for sundown, a priest approaches the men and starts to eulogize their struggle. During his speech, Novica approaches the group and tells them of his goal. He asks to be baptized and the priest baptizes him, while the hajduks receive the eucharist. The priest leaves and the company continues their trek.

=== A Tribute (Harač) ===
Smail-aga arrives at Gatačko Polje with his men on horseback. They set up camp and intend to collect harač from the locals of Gacko and surrounding villages. As payment, they require a sequin for every person, as well as a ram and a young woman per house. Since most peasants are unable to pay, the Turks drag them back to the camp, tied to their horses.

Meanwhile, Smail-aga practices throwing his javelin. He strikes his servant Safer by accident when aiming at a Christian man, and Safer loses an eye. In a fit of rage, Smail-aga orders his men to torture the captured peasants. They chase the peasants on horseback. After they fall to the ground tired, the Turks drag them across the ground with their horses. Smail-aga then orders them to whip the prisoners until they stand up, and threatens to shoe them with horseshoes in mockery of them being barefoot.

The Turks feast on a spit-roasted ram, and throw the bones to their captives who claim they had not eaten in days. They prepare to hang the peasants upside down on linden trees and ignite the hay under their heads.

The company of hajduks travels to Smail-aga's camp through a stormy night. Smail-aga sits in his tent, drinking coffee and smoking pipe with his henchmen Bauk and Mustapa. He asks Bauk to sing to the gusle for him. Bauk mocks Smail-aga, singing about a Rizvan-aga who collected harač in Kosovo, but got copper instead of gold sequins, skinny rams and was provided with old women to rape. Smail-aga is furious and rallies his men to attack the Christians once again.

At that moment, the company attacks Smail-aga and kills Safer with a shot to the other eye. Mirko kills Smail-aga, and the other hajduks kill Mustapa, several of his named henchmen, and around thirty other Turks. Bauk escapes in the night, and Novica is struck down next to Smail-aga while trying to behead his corpse.

=== Doom (Kob) ===
The dead body of Smail-aga (or a puppet in his likeness) has been turned into a mannequin standing in a cottage near Cetinje. He wears all of his old clothes and weapons, but the mannequin is made to put his hands together and bow to a cross, triggered by a tap on the floor.

== Reception ==
Writing in the almanac Danica in 1846, Bogoslav Šulek names the poem "the most beautiful work of this year's Iskra". He claims the work bridges the gap between "romantic" and "folk" poetry, and claims "some follow the Romanticism of the West and of Dubrovnik, others cling to folk poetry. Each side has its reasons; though it seems to me that here, as always – in medio virtus". Croatian literary historian Ivo Frangeš, while generally agreeing with Šulek, points out several issues with his terminology. Most importantly, that the literature of Dubrovnik could more accurately be described as an extension of classicism than of romanticism. He disagrees on the fact that, while incorporating folk elements, Mažuranić strives more strongly towards the artistic, when interpreted dynamically.

== Quotes ==
Ljutit aga mrko gleda
Gdje se silom divit mora
Silan arslan gorskom mišu.

Translation:

The angry aga glumly glances
As he, the mighty lion, is forced
To admire the mountain mouse.

== See also ==
- Illyrian movement
- Croatian literature
