= Brajkovac =

Brajkovac (Serbian Cyrillic: Брајковац) may refer to:

- Brajkovac, Lazarevac
- Brajkovac, Prijepolje
- Brajkovac, Kruševac

== See also ==
- Brajkovići (disambiguation)
- Brajnovac
