= Velibor Kikerec =

Croatian politician (1925–2006)

Velibor Kikerec (29 November 1925 – 17 June 2006) was a Croatian politician.

== Biography ==
Velibor Kikerec was born in Slavonski Brod in 1925 to Ivana and Branimir. His father was the son of noted painter Ferdo Quiquerez. During World War II he was a member of the Yugoslav Partisans. After the war, he worked as a jurist.

In 1990 he became one of the founders of the Croatian Democratic Union (HDZ) party was elected as parliament secretary in May 1990. From August 1991 to January 1992 Kikerec was an assistant Minister of Defense and received rank of Major General in November 1991 during the Croatian War of Independence.

Kikerec died on 17 June 2006 at age 81, and was buried at the Quiquerez/Kikerec family plot in Mirogoj cemetery.
