= Radoje =

Radoje (Cyrillic script: Радоје) is a masculine given name of Slavic origin. It may refer to:

- Radoje Domanović (1873–1908), Serbian writer
- Radoje Đerić (born 1991), Serbian rower
- Radoje Knežević (1901–1981), Serbian politician
- Radoje Kontić (born 1937), Montenegrin politician

== See also ==
- Radojević
- Radojevo
