= Novica Cerović =

Montenegrin duke (1805-95)

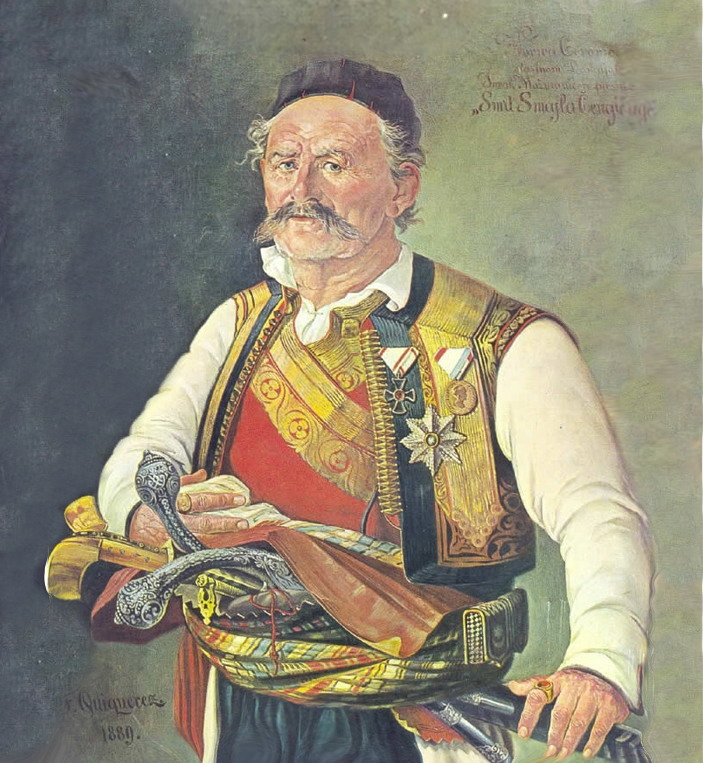
- Novica Cerović by Ferdo Quiquerez, 1889
- Born: 27 October 1805; Tušina, Ottoman Empire
- Died: 1895 (aged 89–90); Tušina, Principality of Montenegro

Novica Cerović (Serbian Cyrillic: Новица Цepoвић; 1805–1895) was a Montenegrin vojvoda (duke) of the Drobnjak clan, who is noted as having defeated and killed a local Ottoman tyrant, Smail-aga Čengić, on the auspices of Petar II Petrović-Njegoš, the Prince-Bishop of Montenegro. He later became a senator in the Montenegrin government.

== Life ==
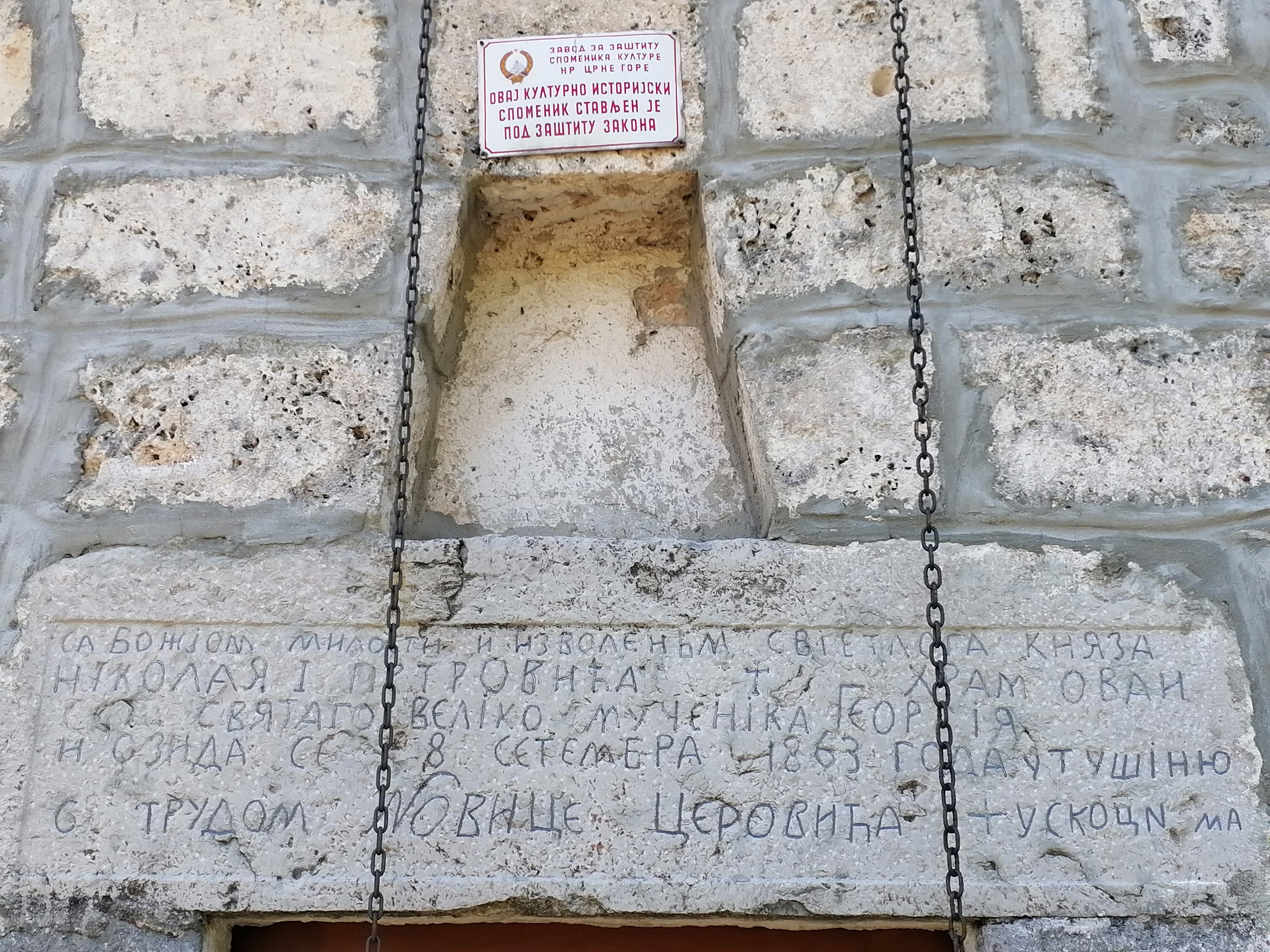

Cerović was born in Tušina, a village near Šavnik in the Drobnjaci clan, then part of the Ottoman Empire (today in Montenegro). His most notable act was leading a successful assault to kill local Ottoman tyrant Smail-aga Čengić under the auspices of Petar II Petrović-Njegoš thereby freeing parts of Herzegovina from the Ottoman Empire and joining them to the Principality of Montenegro.

== Legacy ==
His heroism and the death of Smail-aga Čengić were the theme of Ivan Mažuranić's poem Smrt Smail-age Čengića, an epic poem celebrating the struggle for freedom.

There is a tower in Tušina named after him (the Tower of Duke Novica Cerović).

== See also ==
- Gavro Vuković
