= Ferdo Quiquerez =

Croatian painter of French ancestry

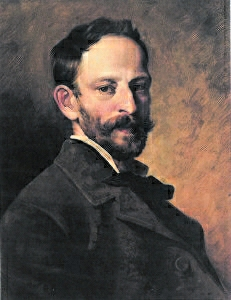
- Self portrait, 1879
- Born: Ferdinand Quiquerez; 17 March 1845; Budapest, Austrian Empire
- Died: 12 January 1893 (aged 47); Zagreb, Austria-Hungary
- Known for: Painting
- Notable work: Arrival of the Croats at Sea; Antemurale Christianitatis

Ferdinand (Ferdo) von Quiquerez, also called Ferdo Kikerec (17 March 1845 – 12 January 1893) was a Croatian painter of French ancestry. Among his most popular history paintings are the Arrival of the Croats at Sea (1870), Kosovo Maiden (1879), and Antemurale Christianitatis (1892).

== Biography ==
Ferdinand Peter von Quiquerez was born in Budapest in 1845. His father Ferdinand von Quiquerez was an Austrian military doctor of French origin, while his mother Maria was from a German-speaking family in Slovenia. After completing his education in Zagreb, he spent a year in the Austrian military school before returning to Zagreb for university. He originally intended to pursue a career in law, but began to study painting with József Ferenc Mücke (1819–1883), who soon redirected his interests. In 1870, a scholarship enabled him to attend the Academy of Fine Arts, Munich where he studied under Johann Leonhard Raab and Karl von Piloty. While in Munich, he met fellow Croatian painter Izidor Kršnjavi, who encouraged him to continue studying ancient art rather than go to Paris, as Quiquerez wanted to do. Poor health, however, led him to transfer to the Accademia di Belle Arti di Venezia where he continued his studies with Pompeo Marino Molmenti. His patriotic inclinations led him to specialize in historical and folkloric works. He found himself unhappy in Venice, and soon embarked on traveling through Italy with Kršnjavi, staying in places such as Florence, Rome, Naples, and Pompeii.

In 1875, Quiquerez went to Dalmatia, where he spent some time before traveling to Montenegro, where he worked for Prince Nicholas during the campaign against the Ottomans. He painted a portrait of the famed Montenegrin warrior Novica Cerović, who had killed Ottoman Bosnian general Smail Agha Čengić decades earlier. Upon his return to Zagreb in 1876, he worked as a drawing teacher in a secondary school, where one of his students was Croatian painter Oton Iveković.

During the Austro-Hungarian campaign in Bosnia and Herzegovina in 1878 and 1879, Quiquerez composed several sketches and drawings of Austro-Hungarian troops led by general Josip Filipović entering Bosanski Brod. In Marija Bistrica, Quiqerez painted 22 frescoes along the arcades of the newly built church which depicted miracles granted by the Blessed Virgin Mary. He also composed drawings of the former monastery in Lepoglava before the great earthquake of 1880 caused significant damage.

In 1883 he married Gizela Hadrović (1863–1914) and six years later they had a son, Branimir, who would eventually become a professor in Slavonski Brod. Branimir's son Velibor Kikerec (1925–2006) would serve as a Partisan in World War II and then assistant Minister of Defense during the Croatian War of Independence.

His last years were marked by ill health, according to longtime friend Izidor Kršnjavi, who visited him two days before his death. Quiquerez died in Zagreb in 1893, and is buried in Mirogoj Cemetery.

== Gallery ==
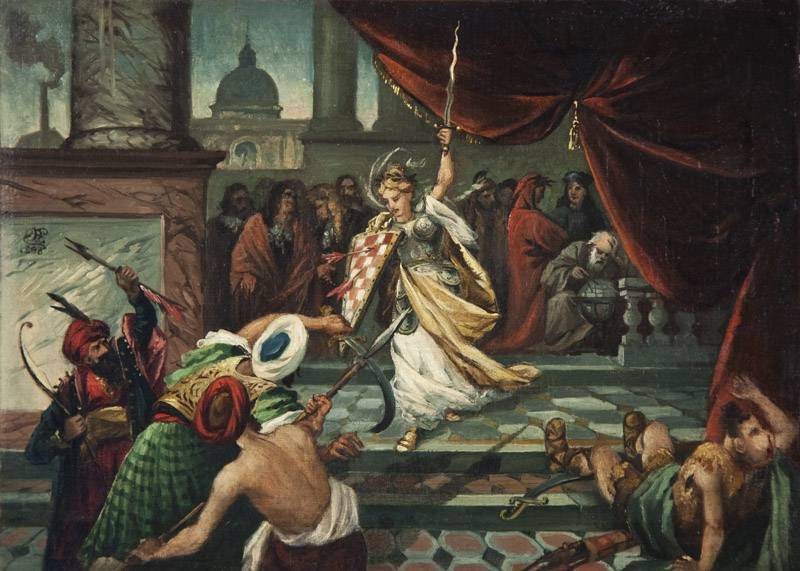
Antemurale Christianitatis

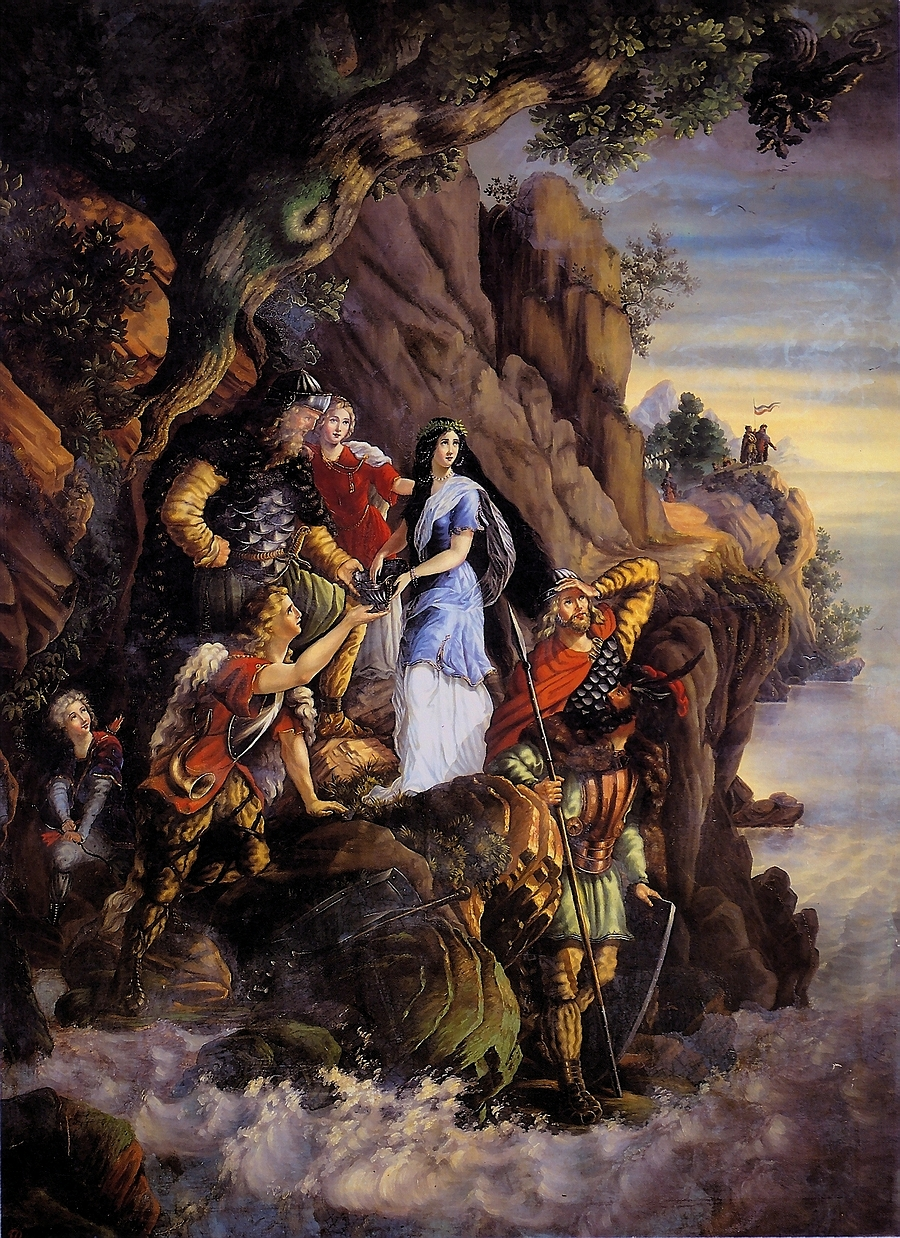
Arrival of the Croats at Sea

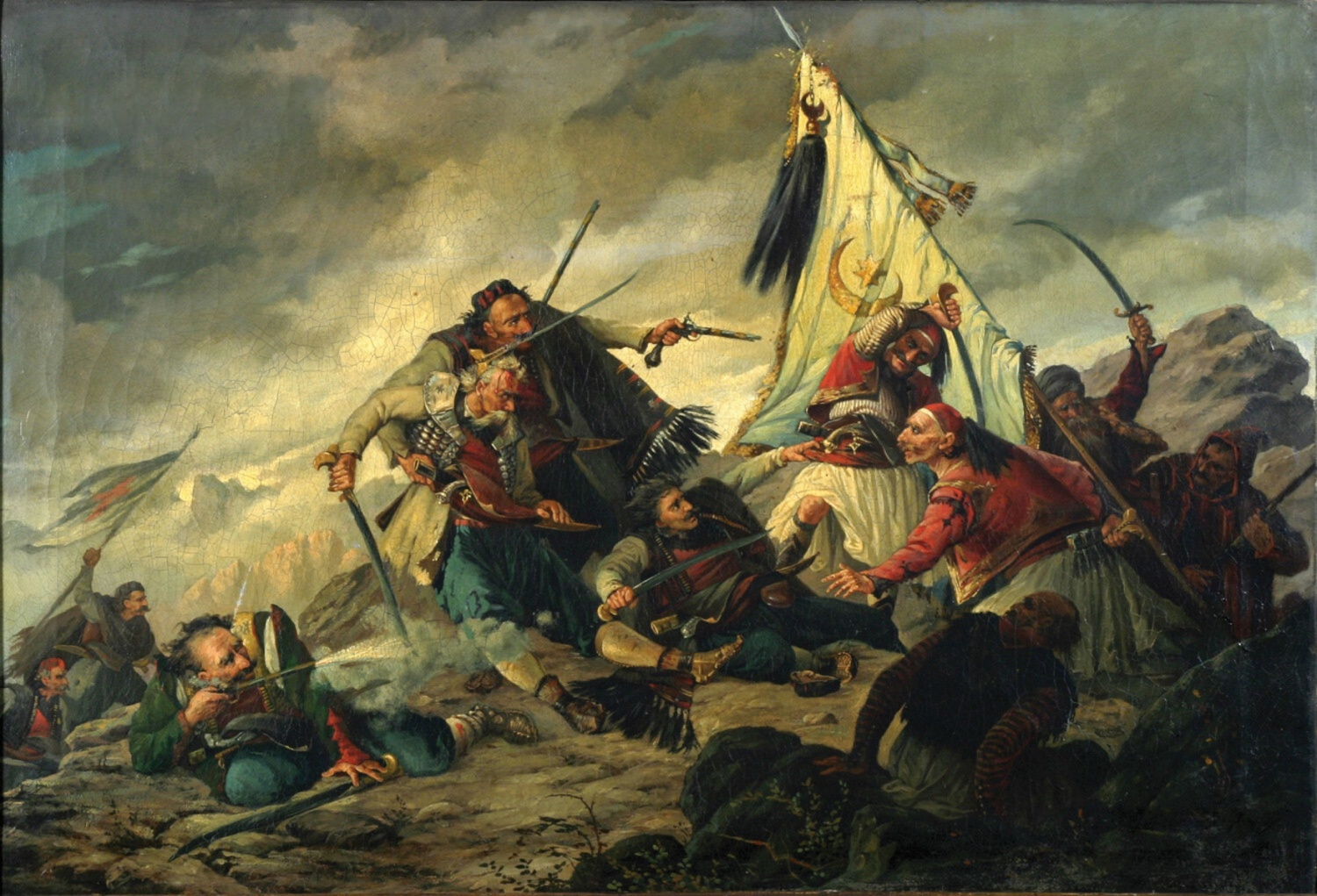
Battle of Montenegrins with Turks

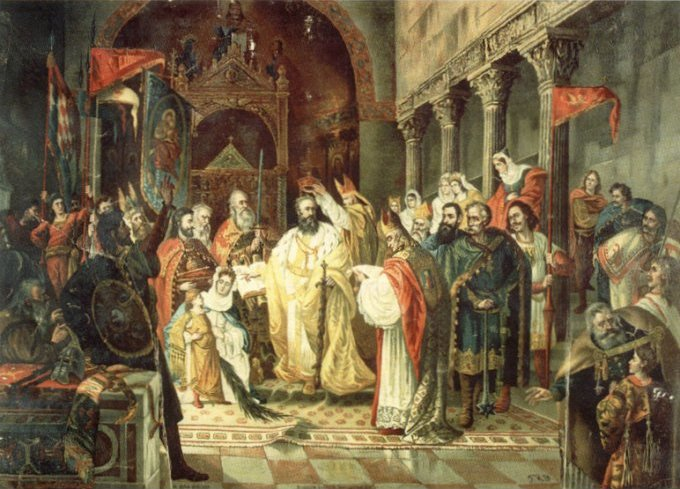
Coronation of King Zvonimir

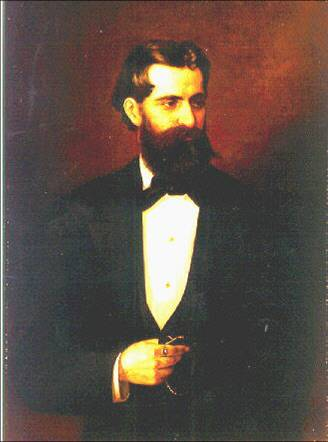
Portrait of Franjo Maixner

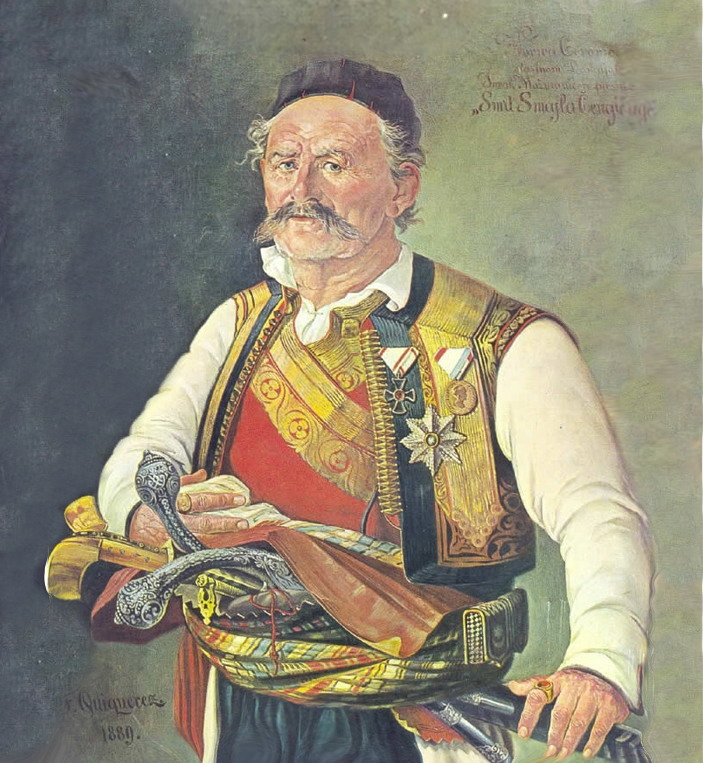
Novica Cerović

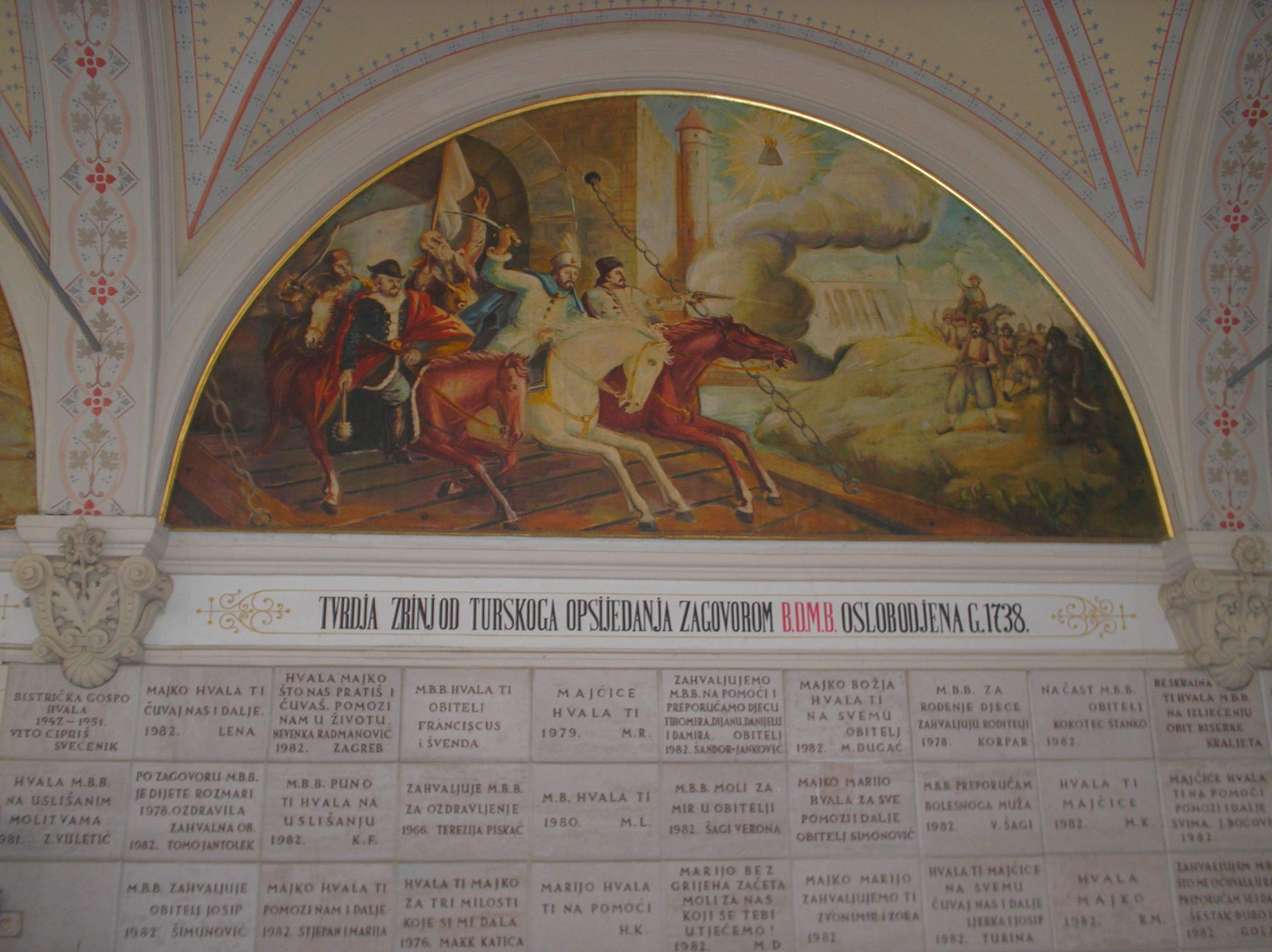
Fresco depicting Zrinj Fortress under Turkish siege during Marian intercession, Marija Bistrica

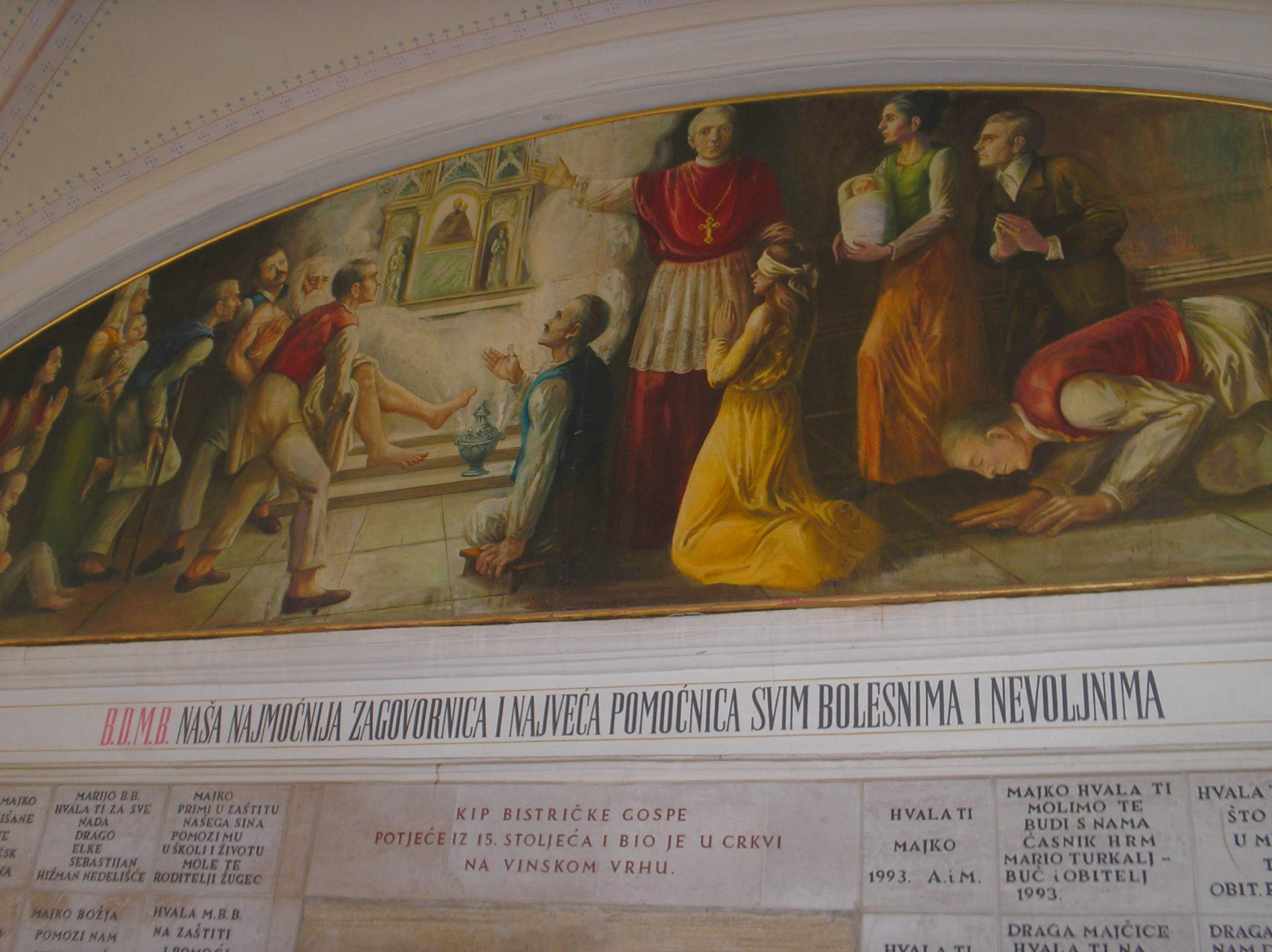
Fresco in the Basilica, Marija Bistrica

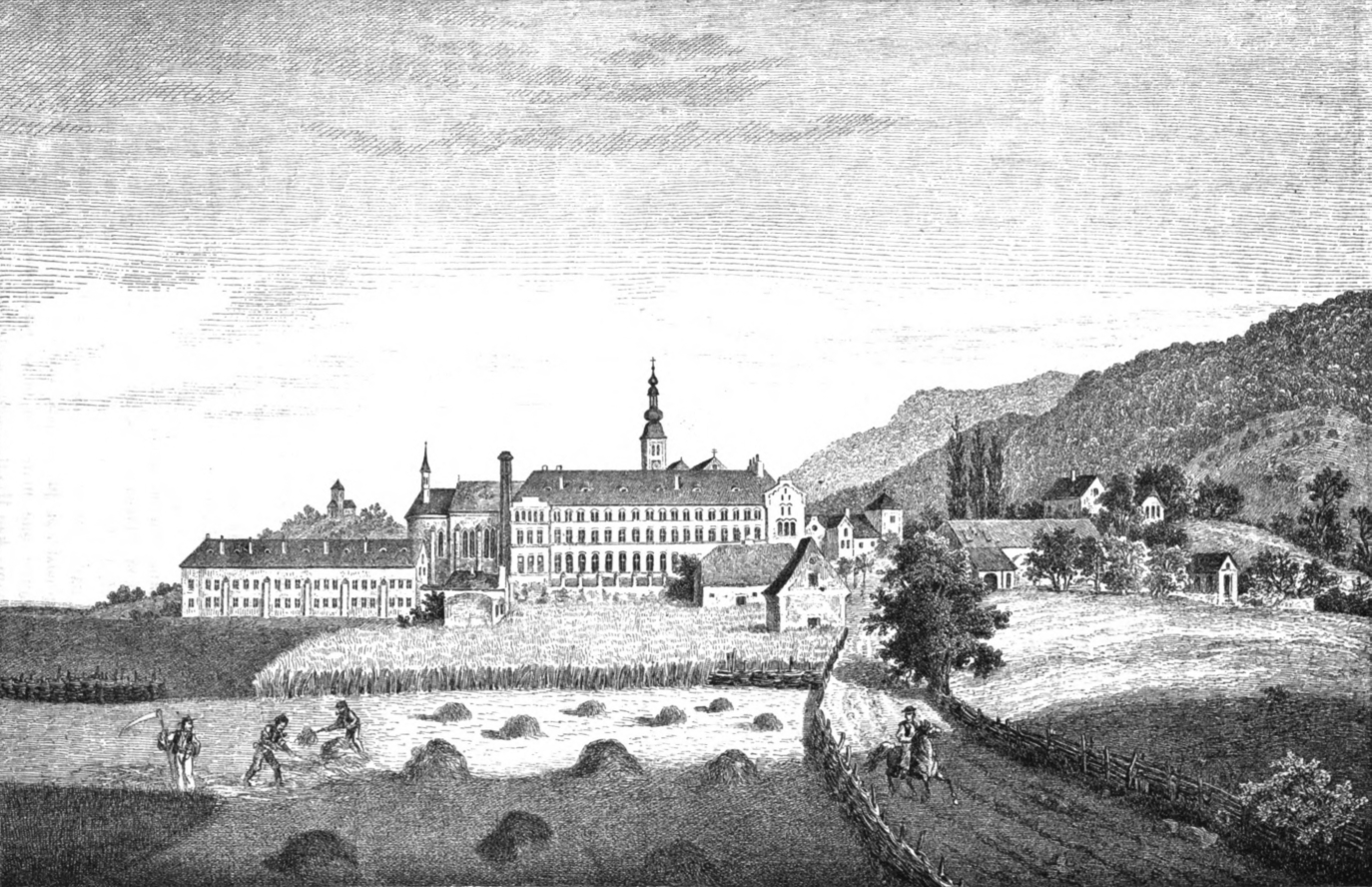
Sketch of Lepoglava in Vienac, 1880.
