= Malović =

Malović (Serbian: Маловић) is a surname. Notable people with the surname include:

- Djurdjina Malović (born 1996), Montenegrin handball player
- Miloš Malović (born 1989), Serbian footballer
- Nikola Malović (born 1970), Serbian writer
- Snežana Malović (born 1976), Serbian politician
- Steve Malovic (1956–2007), American-Israeli basketball player

== See also ==
- Marica Malović-Đukić (born 1949), Serbian historian
