= Brajići =

Brajići may refer to:

- Brajići, Foča, Bosnia and Herzegovina
- Brajići, Travnik, Bosnia and Herzegovina
- Brajići, Budva, Montenegro
- Brajići (Gornji Milanovac), Serbia
