= Kankaraš =

- Language: Serbian

Origin
- Meaning: "Brotherhood" (from Turkish words каn = blood, каrdash = brother)
- Region of origin: northern Montenegro

Kankaraš (Montenegrin, Serbian Cyrillic: Канкараш) is a Serbo-Croatian surname found mostly in Montenegro. Its bearers are either Orthodox Christian or Muslim. There is an old Kankaraš brotherhood (pl. Kankaraši) of the Drobnjaci tribe around Golija near Nikšić (in northwestern Montenegro). A part of the Kankaraši settled Plovdiv, Bulgaria and changed their surname to Černogorski ("Montenegrin"). The Muslim Kankaraš family in Pljevlja hail from Foča, which they left following the Austro-Hungarian occupation of Bosnia and Herzegovina (1878); they are not related to the Kankaraš family in the town. The name is a nickname, derived from Turkish, meaning "large black eyebrows". At least seven individuals with the surname died in the Holocaust in Croatia.

It may refer to:

- Gorica Kankaraš, best Serbian female weightlifter 58 kg, 71 kg and 84 kg.
- Miodrag Kankaraš, former mayor of Tivat, Montenegro, and current general consul of Montenegro in Serbia.
- Sreten Kankaraš, owner of Grand Travel Agency in Montenegro, and Aikido trainer.
- Anto Kankaraš, Serbian mercenary. Also known as the Publisher of Posavina
- Petar Kankaraš, Liberal politician and lawyer from Podgorica.
- Milivoje Kankaraš (d. 28 August 2000), Serbian local politician killed in Marovac, Serbia in 2000 during the Insurgency in the Preševo Valley. He and his wife were abducted and shot by five Albanians.
- Duka Kankaraš (fl. 1855), Montenegrin serdar, from Golija. Served Danilo I, Prince of Montenegro.
- Branko Kankaraš (born 1988), Serbian-born Montenegrin handball player
