= Dromjak =

Village in Ferizaj District, Kosovo

Dromjak Dërmjak (Albanian) Дробњак (Serbian) Drobnjak
- Location within Kosovo
- Coordinates: 42.175034°N 21.306460°E
- Country: Kosovo
- District: Ferizaj
- Municipality: Hani i Elezit
- Elevation: 764 m (2,507 ft)

Population (2011)
  - Total: 121
- Time zone: UTC+1 (CET)
  - Summer (DST): UTC+2 (CEST)
- Postal code: 71510

Dromjak (Albanian: Dërmjak, Serbian Cyrillic: Дробњак /Drobnjak) is a village in Hani i Elezit municipality, Kosovo.

== Demographics ==
According to the 1961 and 1971 censuses, the settlement of Dromjak had an identical population of 107 inhabitants. By the 2011 census, the population had increased to 121 residents, all of whom were recorded as ethnic Albanians.

=== Demographic history ===
Historical population of Dromjak
Year	1961	1971	2011
Population	107	107	121

=== Linguistics ===
The natives of Dromjak speak a distinct sub-dialect with Albanian characteristics of the Kaçanik region. According to philological research published by the Academy of Sciences of Albania, the local speech of Dromjak shares strong linguistic convergence and phonetic features with the sub-dialects spoken in the neighboring settlements of Glloboçicë, Strazhë, Kotlinë, Gorancë, Rezhançë, Krivenik, Seçishtë, Paldonicë, Laç, and Pustenik.
