= Ćopić =

Ćopić is a surname. Notable people with the surname include:

- Branko Ćopić (1915–1984), Bosnian Serb writer
- Milan Ćopić (1897–1941), Yugoslav Croatian communist
- Vladimir Ćopić (1891–1939), Croatian communist

== See also ==
- Čupić
