= Osmanović =

Osmanović is a surname of Bosnian origin. It is a patronymic derived from the Muslim given name Osman. Notable people with the surname include:

- Adil Osmanović (born 1963), Bosnian politician
- Adnan Osmanović (born 1997), Bosnian footballer
- Alek Osmanović (born 1982), Croatian bobsledder
- Amir Osmanović (1970–2025), Bosnian footballer
- Edin Osmanović (born 1964), Slovenian football player and manager
- Dejan Osmanović (born 1973), Serbian footballer
- Dženan Osmanović (born 2000), Bosnian footballer
