= Marica Malović-Đukić =

Serbian historian

Marica Malović-Đukić (Serbian Cyrillic: Марица Маловић-Ђукић; born 1949) is a Serbian historian, specialized in the economic and social history of maritime communes in the Middle Ages, with special focus on Kotor and Dubrovnik.

She finished studying history at the Faculty of Philosophy in Belgrade in 1973, with the work Длугошев списак српских градова for which she received the October Award of the city of Belgrade. She magistered with the work Стефан Дечански in 1977, and the doctorate dissertation Котор у XIII и XIV вијеку was defended in 1988.

She worked at the Historical Institute of SR Montenegro in Podgorica from 1975, and from 1988 she works at the Historical Institute of Serbia. She has worked with the Serbian Academy of Sciences and Arts.

Her languages also include Italian, English, Latin and Old Slavic.

== Sources ==
- Историјски институт Београд. "др Марица Маловић-Ђукић, виши научни сарадник". С А Р А Д Н И Ц И. Историјски институт Београд.
