= Brajkovići, Travnik =

Brajkovići
- Village
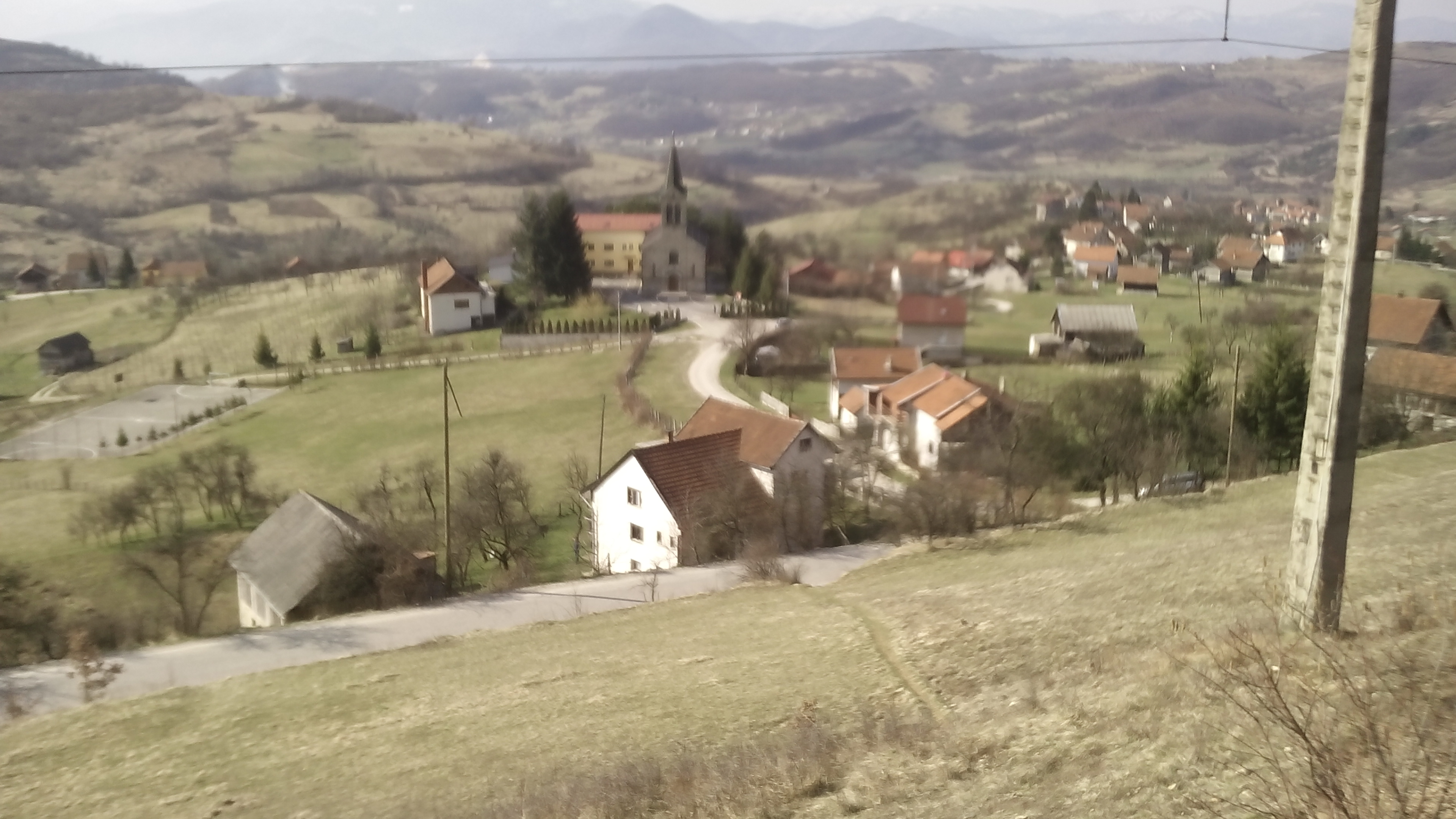

- Location within Bosnia and Herzegovina
- Coordinates: 44.2365544°N 17.7635542°E
- Country: Bosnia and Herzegovina
- Entity: Federation of Bosnia and Herzegovina
- Canton: Central Bosnia
- Municipality: Travnik

Area
  - Total: 1.10 sq mi (2.86 km^{2})

Population (2013)
  - Total: 394
  - Density: 357/sq mi (138/km^{2})
- Time zone: UTC+1 (CET)
  - Summer (DST): UTC+2 (CEST)

Brajkovići is a village in the municipality of Travnik, Bosnia and Herzegovina.

== Demographics ==
According to the 2013 census, its population was 394.

Ethnicity in 2013
Ethnicity	Number	Percentage
Croats	373	94.7%
Bosniaks	17	4.3%
other/undeclared	4	1.0%
Total	394	100%
