= Stojan Cerović =

Serbian journalist

Stojan Cerović (9 July 1949 in Titograd, PR Montenegro, FPR Yugoslavia – 21 March 2005 in Paris, France) was a Serbian journalist.

== Biography ==
Cerović graduated from the University of Belgrade with a degree in psychology in 1973.

Cerović's early professional life was spent opposing Tito in his post-graduate years, the 1970s, then Milošević and his opposition. He had twice evaded the draft. In 1992, during the wake of the war with Croatia, Cerović co-founded the Centre for Anti-War Action in Belgrade and refused induction into the armed forces, calling on his peers to do likewise in a widely-broadcast radio interview. For weeks Cerović was forced to lie low in Montenegro, but returned to Belgrade when things simmered down and resumed writing his column lambasting Milošević and his officials who were still in power.

Cerović made a name for himself as a political critic for the independent weekly magazine Vreme. He often discussed his ambivalent feelings towards both the government and the opposition and stated that he "[does] not care much for any of the opposition parties, not even for all of them together. I have nothing against the regime, except that I consider it responsible for the war, the sanctions, for poverty, theft, crime, and the strangling of the free press. It does not seem to me that anybody in the opposition would be any better, only less effective, which is an advantage. It also seems to me that it is too late to hope for any great improvement in the quality of life, whoever may come into power." Regarding the Belgrade government, he remarked that "The boundaries between real and surreal [were] erased a long time ago."

In March 1999, a week before NATO began its bombing campaign against Yugoslavia, Milošević censored Vreme, which until then was free to criticize the government. Cerović was called upon to join the military. Once again he refused to be conscripted, but this time he had to flee the country. In mid-April (1999) he fled to Hungary with his wife and three children. In Budapest his family was provided with accommodations and given the red carpet treatment by the Hungarian government, a privilege no other Serbian draft dodger and his family was accorded. There Cerović was asked to join an Anglo-American sponsored shadowy government-in-exile, which he refused. In 2000, from January to November, he was employed by the United States Institute of Peace, a U.S. Congress sponsored organization, as a Senior fellow with Special Project Focus. The next few years he lived in a Paris apartment with his family. He became separated from his wife Tinda and died in 2005 following complications after a heart transplant.

He is the author of "Bahanalija", published by Vreme, 1993.
