= Envera Selimović =

- Education: SAIS – The Paul H. Nitze School of Advanced International Studies at Johns Hopkins University in Washington
- Occupation: U.N. Department of Public Information Representative in Azerbaijan

Envera Selimović is a Bosnian journalist. She was the United Nations Department of Public Information Representative in Azerbaijan. At her appointment in 2006, she was described as "one of Bosnia’s best-known and highly respected journalists."

Selimović graduated Politology at the Faculty of Political Sciences in Sarajevo. After graduation, she worked at TV Sarajevo, Radio "202" and then at the Radio Sarajevo.

In 1992 when the Bosnian War broke out, Envera returned to working on television and for almost three years worked as a principal network news anchor and chief foreign editor for Television of Bosnia and Herzegovina. At the end of 1994 she was assigned to work in the United States of America as the head of the New York/Washington, D.C. Bureau for Radio and Television of Bosnia and Herzegovina.

Selimović was awarded the scholarship for the postgraduate studies by the American government, and she holds master's degree in international public policy from The Paul H. Nitze School of Advanced International Studies (SAIS) at Johns Hopkins University, in Washington, D.C.

By the end of 1999, Selimović returned to Sarajevo, and for the next three years she worked at Television of Bosnia and Herzegovina creating a show simply called The Interview. Aside from being remembered by exclusive interviews with then most famous leaders of the country, region, and the whole world, she also hosted numerous world intellectuals and philosophers.

In 2001, Selimovic was declared Bosnia's female journalist of the year.

In March 2003, she left Bosnia and Herzegovina and moved to Tbilisi to perform the job of Spokesperson for the United Nations Observer Mission in Georgia (UNOMIG). For the next three years she was responsible for the mission's strategic communications and advising the head of mission on public information initiatives and activities.

In October 2006, UN Secretary-General, Kofi Annan, appointed Selimović as the Representative of the UN Department of Public Information Office in Baku, Azerbaijan.
