= Seçishtë =

Village in Kosovo

- Village
- Location within Kosovo
- Coordinates: 42°8′39″N 21°17′38″E
- Country: Kosovo
- District: Ferizaj
- Municipality: Hani i Elezit

Population (2024)
  - Total: 2,123
- Time zone: UTC+1 (CET)
  - Summer (DST): UTC+2 (CEST)

Seçishtë is a village in the municipality of Hani i Elezit, Kosovo. According to the Kosovo Agency of Statistics (KAS) from the 2024 census, there were 2,123 people residing in Seçishtë, with Albanians constituting the majority of the population.
