= Brajnovac =

- Village
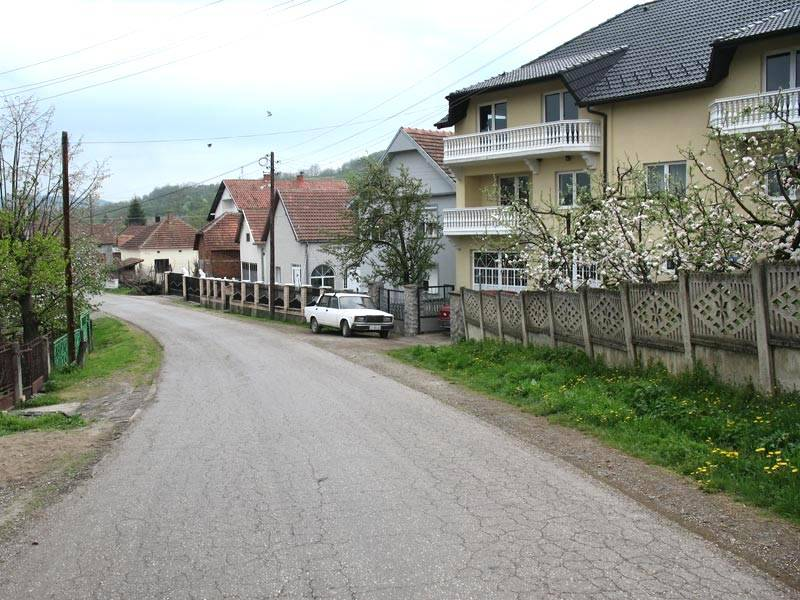

- Location within Serbia
- Coordinates: 43°46′49″N 21°07′45″E
- Country: Serbia

Population (2022)
  - Total: 155
- Time zone: UTC+1 (CET)
  - Summer (DST): UTC+2 (CEST)

Brajnovac (Serbian Cyrillic: Брајновац) is a village in Central Serbia (Šumadija), in the municipality of Rekovac (Region of Levač), located at 43°46′49″N 21°07′45″E, at an elevation of 270 metres (890 ft). According to the 2022 census, the village had 155 citizens.
