= Dejan Ajdačić =

Serbian philologist

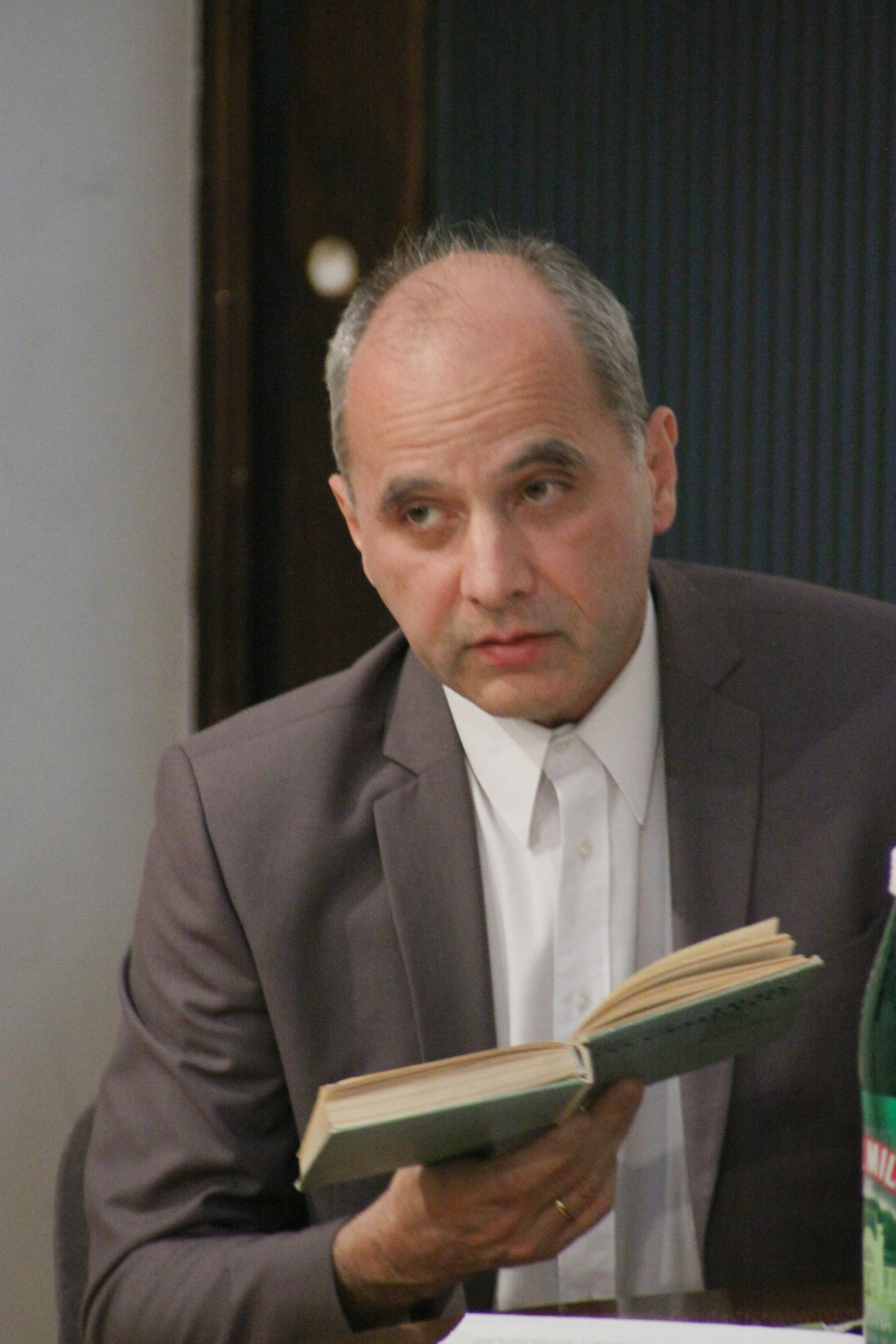
- Born: January 22, 1959 (age 67); Belgrade, Socialist Federal Republic of Yugoslavia
- Occupation: Linguist

Academic background
- Thesis: The world of demons in the literature of Serbian romanticism (2000)

Dejan Ajdačić (Serbian: Дејан Ајдачић; born January 22, 1959), is a Serbian Slavist, philologist, folklorist, ethnolinguist, literary critic, translator and editor.

== Biography ==
=== Education ===
He grew up in Belgrade. Both of his parents were physiochemists. He attended the Primary School "Drinka Pavlović", the Fifth Belgrade Grammar School and Music High School "Stanković" (the violin department). He studied at the Faculty of Philology in Belgrade at the Department of Yugoslav Literature and World Literature. He graduated in 1984 with the paper "On Colours in Serbian National Poetry". He defended his Masters thesis under the title "Images of Love and Beauty in the Poetry of the Petrarchists of Dubrovnik" in 1986, and his doctoral dissertation entitled "The World of Demons in the Literature of Serbian Romanticism" in 2000, at the University of Belgrade Faculty of Philology.

=== Work in Belgrade ===
From 1986 to 1987, he worked at the Vuk Karadžić Endowment, as the first employee since its foundation, and from 1988 to 2002 he was employed at the Department of Folk Literature of the University Library Svetozar Marković in Belgrade – at the Legacy of Vojislav M. Jovanović. In the home of the legator, writer and folklorist, he maintained the library of the endower and his legacy, organized debates and promotions about national culture, such as the conference entitled "The Magical and Aesthetic in the Folklore of the Balkan Slavs" (1993). In collaboration with Ilija Nikolić he edited the book of Vojislav M. Jovanovic entitled "Zbornik radova o narodnoj književnosti" (Collection of Papers on Folk Literature), and with Milanka Todić and colleagues he uncovered his work as an amateur photographer. From 2002 until the autumn of 2003, in the function of the acting general manager of the library, he set up and opened the Austrian library, launched a number of exhibitions in the cycle entitled "Us and Others" (on Serbian relations with the Hungarians, Bulgarians, Arabs, Germans), as well as the cycle "The Great Names of Belgrade University", "Internet and Society", he initiated talks about the reconstruction of the library's interior and participated in the implementation of the TEMPUS project.

=== Work in Kyiv ===
From 2003 he has lived and worked in Kyiv, at the department of Slavic Philology of the Institute of Philology at the Taras Shevchenko National University of Kyiv, holding the position of Serbian lecturer. In the title of an Associate Professor (until 2013) and Full Professor (since 2013) he has taught courses in Serbian language and literature and a number of Slavistics subjects. He has founded and edited "Ukrainian–Serbian collection of papers: Ukras (Ornament)" (since 2006), he took part in compiling the bibliography of Ukrainian translations and studying the Serbian folklore and literature (2005) and he edited the anthology "Modern Serbian Drama" (2006). By bringing together Serbian authors and institutions on the one hand, and Ukrainian publishers on the other, he contributed to the realization of a great number of translations, studies and exhibitions. At the Institute of Philology in Kyiv he organized the conferences "Serbian writer Dragoslav Mihailović" (24 April 2008), "Slavic fantastic literature" (11–12 May 2012; 24 October 2014), as well as the discussions of the authors from the annual collection of papers "Ukras".

=== Work in Łódź ===
From 2017 he has been working in Faculty of Philology, teaching Slavic Philology in University of Łódź.

== Work ==
=== Conferences and Projects ===
He took part in numerous conferences and congresses in Serbia, Croatia, Macedonia, Bulgaria, Belarus, Ukraine, Russia, Poland, Slovakia, Slovenia, Austria and Italy, and in five Slavistic congresses (in 1993, 1998, 2003, 2008, and 2013). He was a researcher participating in the projects of the Ministry of Science of the Republic of Serbia "Comparative studies of Serbian literature (in European context)" (from 2006 to 2010, No. 148018) at the Institute for Literature and Art, and in the project "Folk culture of Serbs between East and West" (from 2011 to 2016, No. 177022) at the Institute for Balkan Studies of the Serbian Academy of Sciences and Arts. He was involved in the international project "Value system of Serbs and their neighbours" EUROJOS (2009–2015), which was headed by Jerzy Bartmiński.

=== Publications ===
The first folkloristic paper of Dejan Ajdačić came out in 1983, and his publishing research has intensified since 1990. Dejan Ajdačić has published papers in Serbian, Bulgarian, Polish, Ukrainian, Russian, English and Italian. He has written nine books in Serbian, one dictionary and five books in Ukrainian, 249 contributions. Some papers have been re-published in several editions and in different languages. The subjects of authorized papers of Dejan Ajdačić fit within the general themes of the collections of papers and annual collections that he has edited, about a third of the papers represents presentations at scientific conferences.

Oral literature of Serbs has been the subject of the early works of Dejan Ajdačić. His career in the library containing rare books of folk literature made him broaden his field of scientific interest to include the folklore of the Balkanic Slavs. The texts devoted to folkloristic science were followed by articles on the work of Vojislav M. Jovanović, his library and his legacy in manuscript form. In 1990s, he produced a number of literary studies, studies at the interface of literature and folk culture from a broader Slavic perspective, and in the latter part of that period the ethnolinguistic studies, as well as lexical and phraseological themes.

=== Translations ===
Ajdačić has done translations (mostly of philological papers) from Polish, Russian, Ukrainian, Italian, Bulgarian, as well as several literary texts from the Ukrainian language.

=== Editorship ===
As a student, Dejan Ajdačić was a member of the editorial staff of the magazine "Znak" (Sign, 1983), and, later on, of the magazine Književna reč (1995). He is the founder and editor-in-chief of the folkloristic-ethnolinguistic magazine "Kodovi slovenskih kultura" (Codes of Slavic Cultures), with contributions in Russian and Serbian (since 1996, ten collections with the following topics: plants, food and drink, wedding, parts of the body, agriculture, colours, children, birds, death, fire). He is the founder and editor of "Ukrainian–Serbian collection Ukras (Ornament)" (since 2006, 8 collections) in Ukrainian. From 1999 he has been the head manager of the electronic library of Serbian culture and culture network Project Rastko which was founded by the playwright Zoran Stefanović.

He has edited approximately twenty thematic Slavistic collections of papers (on eroticism, dystopia, miracles, Old Testament legends, fantastic literature, body, Tesla, Venice, Kyiv, cultural values in language, etc.), which came out in Belgrade, Kraków and Kyiv, then, he compiled an anthology of modern Serbian drama in Ukrainian "Novitnia serbs’ka dramaturgiia" (2006) and a collection of papers of Vojislav M. Jovanovic (1997, 2001), Novak Kilibarda (three books 1998, 2001), Mikola Rjabcuk (2003), Darko Suvin (2009), Per Jakobsen (2010) and Jerzy Bartmiński (2011).

The magazines and collection that were edited by Dejan Ajdačić contain the papers of 430 authors, from Ukraine, Serbia, Poland, Russia, Bulgaria, Croatia, Italia, and Macedonia.

He is a member of editorial boards, editorial staff or a reviewer of a number of magazines in Bulgaria, Poland and Serbia, a member of the Committee for Ethnolinguistics and the Committee for Folkoristics of the International Committee of Slavists.

== Bibliography ==
- Izabrana dela, Beograd, 1988, 50 s. (co-author Ivan Srdanović)
- Novak Kilibarda — naučnik, književnik, Bar, 2000, 437 pp.
- Prilozi proučavanju folklora balkanskih Slovena, Beograd, 2004, 311 pp. ISBN 86-83215-03-2
- Korotkyj ukrajins'ko-serbs'kyj slovnyk spolučuvanostі slіv. Navčal'nyj slovnyk, Kyiv, 2005, 126 pp. (co-author Iulіa Bіlonog)
- Serbs'ki fol'klor i literatura v ukrajins'kyh perekladah i doslidžennjah 1837–2004: Materialy do bibliografiji, Kyiv, 2005.
- Slavistička istraživanja, Beograd, 2007, 298 pp. ISBN 978-86-7363-521-7
- Futuroslavija. Studije o slovenskoj naučnoj fantastici, Beograd, Emitor No. 463, 2008, 102 pp.
  - Futuroslavija. Studije o slovenskoj naučnoj fantastici, Beograd, 2009, 200 pp. ISBN 978-86-84775-01-8
- Futuroslavіja. Lіteraturoznavčі ogljady pro futurofantastyku, Kyiv, 2010, 172 pp. ISBN 978-966-439-305-5
- Slavіstyčnі doslіdžennja: fol'klorystyčnі, lіteraturoznavčі, movoznavčі, Kyiv, 2010, 307 pp. ISBN 978-966-439-316-1
- Demony і bogy u slov'jans'kyh lіteraturah, Kyiv, 2011, 184 pp. ISBN 978-966-439-411-3
- Erotoslavija. Preobraženja Erosa u slovenskim književnostima, Beograd, 2013, 415 pp. ISBN 978-86-6081-110-5
- Erotoslavija: Peretvorennja Erosa u slov'jans'kyh literaturah, Kyiv, 2015, 513 pp. ISBN 978-617-569-207-3
- Porivnjal'na serbs'ko-ukrajins'ka frazeologija: Navchal'nyj posibnyk, Kyiv, 2015, 272 pp. (co-author Lidia Nepop-Ajdačić) ISBN 978-617-7241-49-1
- Porivnjal'na serbs'ko-ukrajins'ka frazeologija: Navchal'nyj posibnyk, Kyiv, 2015, 259 pp. (co-author Lidia Nepop-Ajdačić)
- Poredbena srpsko-ukrajinska frazeologija, Beograd, 2015, 242 pp. (co-author Lidia Nepop-Ajdačić) ISBN 978-86-7974-371-8
- Perunoslavija: O paganskim bogovima u nepaganska vremena, Beograd, 2016, 184 pp. ISBN 978-86-7974-414-2
- Radovi Dejana Ajdačića. Anotirana bibliografija, Beograd, 2016, 261 pp. (co-author Vera Petrović) ISBN 978-86-7974-426-5
- SlovoSlavia: Studia z etnolingwistyki slowianskiej, Łódź, 2018, 262 pp. ISBN 978-8380889873
