= Vemić =

Vemić (Serbian Cyrillic: Вемић) is a Serbo-Croatian surname. Notable people with the surname include:

- Dušan Vemić (born 1976), Serbian tennis coach and former player
- Miloš Vemić (born 1987), Serbian volleyball player
- Uroš Vemić (born 1987), Serbian-born Montenegrin footballer
