= Maurice Pedro Muteba Mwanza =

Congolese footballer

Mwanza Muteba
Personal information
- Full name: Maurice Pedro Muteba Mwanza
- Date of birth: 29 September 1980 (age 46)
- Place of birth: Republic of the Congo
- Height: 1.78 m (5 ft 10 in)
- Position: Midfielder

Senior career*
Years	Team	Apps	(Gls)
1998–1999	Vita Club Mokanda		
1999–2000	Vita Club		
2001	Anzhi Makhachkala	1	(0)
2002	Torpedo-Kadino Mogilev	12	(3)
2004–2006	MKT Araz	44	(6)
2006–2007	Olimpik Baku	14	(2)
2007–2012	Tatlısu Halk Odası		
2012–2013	Doğan Türk Birliği	13	(0)
2013	AS Ponténégrine		
- * Club domestic league appearances and goals

Mwanza Muteba (born 29 September 1980) is a Congolese former football player.

== Career ==
In 2001, Muteba became the first Congolese footballer to play in the Russian top flight, when he signed for Anzhi Makhachkala, but only made one appearance for the club.

== Career statistics ==
Club statistics
Season	Club	League	League		Cup		Other		Total	
Season	Club	League	App	Goals	App	Goals	App	Goals	App	Goals
2001	Anzhi Makhachkala	RFPL	1	0			—		1	0
2002	Torpedo-Kadino Mogilev	Belarusian First League	12	3			—		12	3
2004–05	MKT Araz	Azerbaijan Top League	27	4			—		27	4
2005–06	MKT Araz	Azerbaijan Top League	17	2			—		17	2
2006–07	Olimpik Baku	Azerbaijan Top League	14	2			—		14	2
2007-08	Tatlısu Halk Odası	Birinci Lig					—			
2008-09	Tatlısu Halk Odası	Birinci Lig					—			
2009-10	Tatlısu Halk Odası	Birinci Lig					—			
2010-11	Tatlısu Halk Odası	Birinci Lig	2	1			—		2	1
2011-12	Tatlısu Halk Odası	Birinci Lig	24	5	0	0	—		24	5
2012-13	Doğan Türk Birliği	Birinci Lig	13	0	2	0	—		15	0
Total	Russia		1	0			—		1	0
Total	Belarus		12	3			—			
Total	Azerbaijan		58	8			—		58	8
Total	Northern Cyprus						—			
Career total			71	11			0	0	71	11
