= Selimović =

Selimović is a Bosnian surname meaning "son of Salim". It may refer to:

- Alma Selimovic (born 1981), artist and LGBT activist
- Beba Selimović (1939–2020), Bosnian singer
- Denis Selimović (born 1979), Slovenian footballer
- Edin Selimović (born 1991), Serbian footballer
- Envera Selimović, national of Bosnia and Herzegovina and United Nations Department of Public Information Representative in Azerbaijan
- Himzo Selimović (born 1961), Bosnian politician and former policeman
- Jasenko Selimović (born 1968), Bosnian-born Swedish theatre director
- Meša Selimović (1910–1982), Yugoslav writer
- Sabina Selimovic (1999-?), Austrian national which joined ISIS in 2014 and later disappeared
- Šejla Selimović (1995), Bosnian footballer
- Suvada Selimović (born 1965), Bosnian activist and pacifist
- Vahid Selimović, (born 1997), Serbian-Luxembourgian footballer
