= Radojević =

Radojević (Serbian Cyrillic: Радојевић) is a Serbian surname, a patronymic derived from the masculine given name Radoje. It may refer to:

- Aleksandar Radojević (born 1976), basketball player
- Goran Radojević (born 1963), football player
- Miloš Radojević (born 1986), football player
- Prvoslav Radojević, Serbian nobleman
