= Pavićević =

Pavićević (Serbian Cyrillic: Павићевић, pronounced [paʋǐːtɕeʋitɕ]) is a South Slavic surname, commonly found in Montenegro, Serbia and Croatia. Notable people with the surname include:

- Biljana Pavićević (basketball) (born 1980), Montenegrin women's basketball player
- Biljana Pavićević (handballer) (born 1988), Montenegrin women's handball player
- Bojan Pavićević (born 1975), Serbian futsal player
- Borka Pavićević (1947–2019), Montenegrin dramaturge and cultural activist
- Darko Pavićević (born 1986), Montenegrin footballer
- Ljubomir Pavićević Fis (1927–2015), Serbian graphic and industrial designer
- Luka Pavićević (born 1968), Serbian basketball coach
- Marko Pavićević (born 1986), Serbian footballer
- Milija Pavićević (1943-2011),physician, neuropsychiatrist, Doctor of Medical Sciences,primarius, and professor
- Mila Pavićević (born 1988), Croatian writer
- Nataša M. Pavićević (born 1993), poet
- Savo Pavićević (born 1980), Montenegrin footballer
- Zorica Pavićević (born 1956), Montenegrin women's handball player
