= Čupić =

Čupić (Serbian Cyrillic: Чупић) is a Serbian surname, a patronymic derived from the nickname Čupo, meaning "mug" or "jar". It may refer to:

- Čedomir Čupić (born 1947), Serbian political scientist and lawyer
- Ivan Čupić (born 1986), Croatian handballer
- Ljubo Čupić (1913–1942), Yugoslav communist
- Miloš Čupić (born 1999), Serbian football goalkeeper
- Stefan Čupić (born 1994), Serbian football goalkeeper
- Stojan Čupić (1765–1815), Serbian Revolutionary

== See also ==
- Ćopić
