= Brajići, Travnik =

Brajići
- Village
- Location within Bosnia and Herzegovina
- Coordinates: 44.2158427°N 17.7495302°E
- Country: Bosnia and Herzegovina
- Entity: Federation of Bosnia and Herzegovina
- Canton: Central Bosnia
- Municipality: Travnik

Area
  - Total: 1.19 sq mi (3.08 km^{2})

Population (2013)
  - Total: 628
  - Density: 528/sq mi (204/km^{2})
- Time zone: UTC+1 (CET)
  - Summer (DST): UTC+2 (CEST)

Brajići is a village in the municipality of Travnik, Bosnia and Herzegovina.

== Demographics ==
According to the 2013 census, its population was 628.

Ethnicity in 2013
Ethnicity	Number	Percentage
Bosniaks	600	95.5%
Croats	24	3.8%
other/undeclared	4	0.6%
Total	628	100%
