= Miloš Cerović =

Serbian swimmer (born 1980)

Personal information
- Full name: Miloš Cerović
- National team: Yugoslavia
- Born: 7 April 1980 (age 46) Belgrade, SR Serbia, SFR Yugoslavia
- Height: 1.83 m (6 ft 0 in)
- Weight: 73 kg (161 lb)

Sport
- Sport: Swimming
- Strokes: Backstroke
- Club: Partizan Beograd
- College team: Ohio State University (U.S.)
- Coach: Bill Wadley (U.S.)

Miloš Cerović (Serbian: Милош Церовић; born April 7, 1980) is a Serbian former swimmer, who specialized in backstroke events. He is a 2000 Olympian, and a member of the Ohio State University swimming and diving team while studying in the United States.

Cerovic competed only in the men's 200 m backstroke at the 2000 Summer Olympics in Sydney, as a member of the former Yugoslav squad. He posted a FINA B-standard entry time of 2:07.03 from the U.S. National Championships in Federal Way, Washington. He challenged five other swimmers in heat one, including Hong Kong's Alex Fong, who later became one of city's most popular singers. He fought off a challenge from Kyrgyzstan's Aleksandr Yegorov to earn a fifth spot in 2:09.07. Cerovic failed to advance into the semifinals, as he placed forty-third overall in the prelims.

A graduate of hotel management from St. Johns University with a master's degree in hotel management from the University Nevada Las Vegas, Cerovic currently works as a resident manager for Shangri-La. He also served as a "residential service lead" for the athletes' village when London hosted the 2012 Summer Olympics. Cerovic is fluent in English and Serbian.

Cerović has worked Hotel Beach Rotana Abu Dhabi as resident manager from May 2016 onward.
