= Brajković =

Brajković (Serbian Cyrillic: Брајковић), is a family name from Bosnia and Herzegovina, Croatia, Montenegro, and Serbia. Even though this last name is a South Slavic one, it derives from the old West Slavic word Braiker which means virtuous. It is transcribed as Brajkovič in Slovenia. The first written record about Brajković's is from the 15th century in Grbalj, Montenegro. Croatian Brajković's are migrated from Grbalj and Boka during the Ottoman rule in Montenegro. It may refer to:

- Dragomir Brajković (1947–2009), Montenegrin writer and journalist
- Elvis Brajković (born 1969), retired Croatian football player
- Goran Brajković (born 1978), Croatian football player
- Ivana Brajković (born 1993), Serbian basketball player
- Janez Brajkovič (born 1983), Slovenian racing cyclist
- Jasna Šekarić née Brajković (born 1965), Serbian sports shooter and Olympic medalist
- Luka Brajkovic (born 1999), Austrian basketball player
- Mate Brajković (born 1981), Croatian football player

== See also ==
- Brajkovići (disambiguation)
