= Grbović =

Grbović (also spelt Grbovic) is a surname.

Notable people with the surname include:

- Miomir Grbović, leader of the League of Communists of Yugoslavia
- Radovan Grbović, a Serbian knez and vojvoda
- Pavle Grbović, a Serbian politician
- Goran Grbović, a Serbian basketball player
- Vedrana Grbović, a Serbian model
- Ivan Grbovic, a Canadian cinematographer, film director and screenwriter (Serbian descent)
- Andrija Grbović, a Montenegrin basketball player
- Nikola Grbović, a Serbian revolutionary
- Milovan Grbović, a Serbian revolutionary
- Lazar Grbović, a Serbian basketball player
- Žarko Grbović, a Montenegrin footballer
- Altin Grbović, a Serbian footballer
- Nemanja Grbović, a Montenegrin handball player
