= Jovan Drobnjak =

Montenegrin footballer (born 1974)

Personal information
- Date of birth: 15 July 1974 (age 52)
- Place of birth: Mojkovac, SFR Yugoslavia
- Height: 1.84 m (6 ft 0 in)
- Position: Striker

Senior career*
Years	Team	Apps	(Gls)
–2001	FK Beograd		
2001	FC HIT	2	(0)
2002	Korotan Prevalje	8	(0)
2002-2003	Dunaferr	21	(5)
2003–2004	Honvéd Budapest		
2004-2005	Békéscsaba	12	(0)
2005	Vllaznia Shkodër	3	(0)
2006	Partizani Tirana	7	(1)
2006-2008	Olimpik Baku	28	(2)
- * Club domestic league appearances and goals

Jovan Drobnjak (born 15 July 1974) is a Serbian retired football striker.
