= Tušina, Šavnik =

Tušina Тушина
- Village
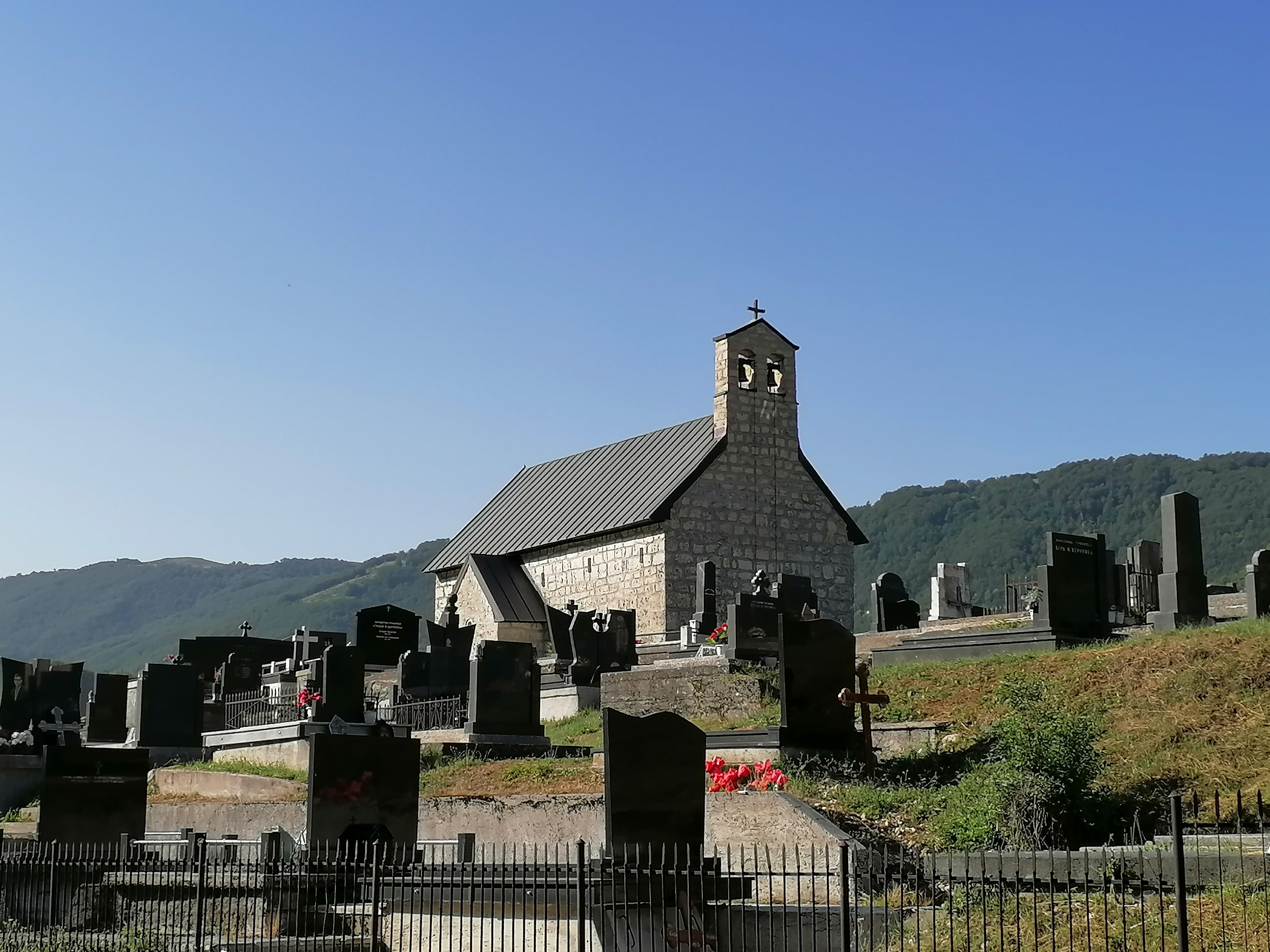

- Location within Montenegro
- Country: Montenegro
- Region: Northern
- Municipality: Šavnik

Population (2011)
  - Total: 120
- Time zone: UTC+1 (CET)
  - Summer (DST): UTC+2 (CEST)

Tušina (Montenegrin: Тушина) is a village in the municipality of Šavnik, Montenegro.

== Demographics ==
According to the 2011 census, its population was 120.

Ethnicity in 2011
| Ethnicity | Number | Percentage |
|---|---|---|
| Montenegrins | 74 | 61.7% |
| Serbs | 39 | 32.5% |
| other/undeclared | 7 | 5.8% |
| Total | 120 | 100% |
