= 2016–17 Neftchi Baku PFK season =

Neftchi Baku
2016–17 season
- Chairman: Chingiz Abdullayev
- Manager: Vali Gasimov (until 14 September); Elkhan Abdullayev (from 15 September)
- Stadium: Bakcell Arena
- Premier League: 7th
- Azerbaijan Cup: Semi-final vs Qarabağ
- Europa League: Second qualifying round vs Shkëndija
- Top goalscorer: League: Daniel Lucas (4); All: Two Players (4)
Home colours	Away colours	Third colours

The Neftchi Baku 2016–17 season is Neftchi Baku's 25th Azerbaijan Premier League season. Neftchi will compete Azerbaijan Premier League and in the 2016–17 Azerbaijan Cup and UEFA Europa League.

== Season events ==
Following the club's 8-0 defeat to Gabala on 10 September, Vali Gasimov was fired as manager. The following day Elkhan Abdullayev was appointed as manager until the end of the season.

== Squad ==
As of match played 29 April 2017

No.	Name	Nationality	Position	Date of birth (age)	Signed from	Signed in	Contract ends	Apps.	Goals
Goalkeepers
33	Boban Bajković	(Montenegro)	GK	15 March 1985 (aged 32)	Unattached	2016	2017	19	0
53	Maksim Vaylo	(Azerbaijan)	GK	13 May 1995 (aged 21)	Dynamo Kyiv	2014		14	0
Defenders
3	Jairo	(Brazil)	DF	31 December 1992 (aged 24)	Trofense	2015		46	3
4	Rahil Mammadov	(Azerbaijan)	DF	24 November 1995 (aged 21)	Academy	2013		43	1
6	Pavel Dreksa	(Czech Republic)	DF	17 September 1989 (aged 27)	on loan from MFK Karviná	2017	2017	12	0
15	Ruslan Abishov	(Azerbaijan)	DF	10 October 1987 (aged 29)	Inter Baku	2017			
22	Mahir Shukurov	(Azerbaijan)	DF	12 December 1982 (aged 34)	Karşıyaka	2016			
26	Kamal Gurbanov	(Azerbaijan)	DF	6 May 1994 (aged 22)	Academy	2015		40	1
27	Magsad Isayev	(Azerbaijan)	DF	7 June 1994 (aged 22)	Academy	2013		95	1
29	Giorgi Navalovski	(Georgia (country))	DF	28 June 1986 (aged 30)	Veria	2017		16	0
61	Tayyar Mammadov	(Azerbaijan)	DF	10 February 1996 (aged 21)	Baku	2016		2	0
95	Elvin Badalov	(Azerbaijan)	DF	14 June 1995 (aged 21)	Zenit St.Petersburg	2014		58	1
Midfielders
7	Namiq Ələsgərov	(Azerbaijan)	MF	3 February 1995 (aged 22)	Qarabağ	2017		12	2
8	Zdeněk Folprecht	(Czech Republic)	MF	7 January 1991 (aged 26)	on loan from Slovan Liberec	2017		16	1
10	Javid Imamverdiyev	(Azerbaijan)	MF	1 August 1990 (aged 26)	Academy	2008			
13	Murad Agayev	(Azerbaijan)	MF	9 February 1993 (aged 24)	Sumgayit	2016		15	0
17	Rahman Hajiyev	(Azerbaijan)	MF	25 July 1993 (aged 23)	Baku	2015		94	9
19	Fahmin Muradbayli	(Azerbaijan)	MF	16 March 1996 (aged 21)	Academy	2013		67	6
21	Agshin Gurbanli	(Azerbaijan)	MF	15 July 1996 (aged 20)	Academy	2013		3	0
23	Tarzin Cahangirov	(Azerbaijan)	MF	17 January 1992 (aged 25)	Academy	2016		22	0
28	Kyrylo Petrov	(Ukraine)	MF	22 June 1990 (aged 26)	Olimpik Donetsk	2017		12	0
80	Edson Castillo	(Venezuela)	MF	18 May 1994 (aged 22)	Mineros de Guayana	2016		27	0
Forwards
9	Hugo Bargas	(France)	FW	22 October 1986 (aged 30)	Club Blooming	2017		15	2
11	Ignacio Herrera	(Chile)	FW	14 October 1987 (aged 29)	Irtysh Pavlodar	2017		15	3
12	Dani Segovia	(Spain)	FW	23 May 1985 (aged 31)	SKN St. Pölten	2017		15	4
49	Ibrahim Aliyev	(Azerbaijan)	FW	17 July 1999 (aged 17)	Academy	2016		3	0
Away on loan
20	Eltun Yagublu	(Azerbaijan)	DF	19 August 1991 (aged 25)	Qarabağ	2016		7	0
88	Orkhan Gurbanli	(Azerbaijan)	MF	12 July 1995 (aged 21)	Academy	2014		1	0
	Mirabdulla Abbasov	(Azerbaijan)	FW	27 April 1995 (aged 22)	Academy	2015		5	0
Left during the season
1	Krševan Santini	(Croatia)	GK	11 April 1987 (aged 30)	Enosis Neon Paralimni	2016		12	0
6	Vanče Šikov	(North Macedonia)	DF	19 July 1985 (aged 31)	Austria Wien	2016		10	0
7	Araz Abdullayev	(Azerbaijan)	MF	18 April 1992 (aged 25)	Everton	2012		217	35
8	Elshan Abdullayev	(Azerbaijan)	MF	5 February 1994 (aged 23)	Academy	2012			
9	Cătălin Țîră	(Romania)	FW	18 June 1994 (aged 22)	Rapid București	2016		8	1
11	Ruslan Gurbanov	(Azerbaijan)	FW	12 September 1991 (aged 25)	Rostov	2010		88	27
30	Dario Melnjak	(Croatia)	DF	31 October 1992 (aged 24)	on loan from Lokeren Oost-Vlaanderen	2016		14	0
90	Pessalli	(Brazil)	MF	24 September 1990 (aged 26)	Angers	2016		10	4
99	Denílson	(Brazil)	FW	18 July 1995 (aged 21)	on loan from Recreativo Granada	2016		9	1

=== Out on loan ===
Note: Flags indicate national team as defined under FIFA eligibility rules; some limited exceptions apply. Players may hold more than one non-FIFA nationality.

No.	Pos.	Nation	Player
20	DF	AZE	Eltun Yagublu (at Sabail)
88	MF	AZE	Orkhan Gurbanli (at Sabail)

No.	Pos.	Nation	Player
—	FW	AZE	Mirabdulla Abbasov (at Sumgayit)

== Transfers ==
=== Summer ===
In: Note: Flags indicate national team as defined under FIFA eligibility rules; some limited exceptions apply. Players may hold more than one non-FIFA nationality.

No.	Pos.	Nation	Player
1	GK	CRO	Krševan Santini (from (Cyprus) Enosis)
6	DF	MKD	Vanče Šikov (from Austria Wien)
9	FW	ROU	Cătălin Țîră (from (Romania) Rapid București)
13	MF	AZE	Murad Agayev (from (Azerbaijan) Sumgayit)
20	DF	AZE	Eltun Yagublu (loan from (Azerbaijan) Qarabağ)
22	DF	AZE	Mahir Shukurov
23	MF	AZE	Tarzin Jahangirov (from (Azerbaijan) Gabala)
30	DF	CRO	Dario Melnjak (loan from (Belgium) Lokeren)
33	GK	MNE	Boban Bajković
80	MF	VEN	Edson Castillo (from (Venezuela) Mineros)
88	MF	AZE	Orkhan Gurbanli (loan return from (Latvia) Daugavpils)
90	MF	BRA	Pessalli (from (France) Angers)
99	FW	BRA	Denílson (loan from (Spain) Granada B)

Out: Note: Flags indicate national team as defined under FIFA eligibility rules; some limited exceptions apply. Players may hold more than one non-FIFA nationality.

No.	Pos.	Nation	Player
1	GK	AZE	Aqil Mammadov (to (Azerbaijan) AZAL)
5	DF	ESP	Melli (to (Spain) Reus Deportiu)
6	DF	BRA	Ailton (loan return to (Brazil) Fluminense)
9	FW	CHI	Nicolás Canales (to (Kazakhstan) Okzhetpes)
11	FW	AZE	Ruslan Qurbanov (to (Azerbaijan) Gabala)
14	FW	AZE	Magomed Kurbanov (loan return to (Azerbaijan) Sumgayit)
15	MF	PAR	Éric Ramos (to (Paraguay) Rubio Ñu)
18	MF	AZE	Elshan Rzazade (to (Azerbaijan) Mil-Muğan)
20	FW	ESP	Añete (to (Bulgaria) Levski Sofia)
22	FW	AZE	Mirabdulla Abbasov (loan to (Azerbaijan) Sumgayit, previously on loan to (Latvia) Daugavpils)

=== Winter ===
In: Note: Flags indicate national team as defined under FIFA eligibility rules; some limited exceptions apply. Players may hold more than one non-FIFA nationality.

No.	Pos.	Nation	Player
6	DF	CZE	Pavel Dreksa (loan from (Czech Republic) MFK Karviná)
7	MF	AZE	Namig Alasgarov (from (Azerbaijan) Qarabağ)
8	MF	CZE	Zdeněk Folprecht (loan from (Czech Republic) Slovan Liberec)
9	FW	FRA	Hugo Bargas (from (Bolivia) Blooming)
11	FW	CHI	Ignacio Herrera (from (Kazakhstan) Irtysh Pavlodar)
12	FW	ESP	Daniel Lucas (from (Austria) St. Pölten)
15	DF	AZE	Ruslan Abışov (to (Azerbaijan) Neftchi Baku)
28	MF	UKR	Kyrylo Petrov (from (Ukraine) Olimpik Donetsk)
29	DF	GEO	Giorgi Navalovski (from (Greece) Veria)

Out: Note: Flags indicate national team as defined under FIFA eligibility rules; some limited exceptions apply. Players may hold more than one non-FIFA nationality.

No.	Pos.	Nation	Player
1	GK	CRO	Krševan Santini
5	DF	AZE	Anton Krivotsyuk
6	DF	MKD	Vanče Šikov
7	MF	AZE	Araz Abdullayev (to (Azerbaijan) Gabala)
8	MF	AZE	Elshan Abdullayev (to (Azerbaijan) Qarabağ)
9	FW	ROU	Cătălin Țîră
20	DF	AZE	Eltun Yagublu (loan to (Azerbaijan) Sabail)
30	DF	CRO	Dario Melnjak (loan return to (Belgium) Lokeren)
41	DF	AZE	Omar Buludov
45	MF	AZE	Kamran Najafzade
66	GK	AZE	Kamran Ibrahimov
72	DF	AZE	Bilal Abbaszade
88	MF	AZE	Orkhan Gurbanli (loan to (Azerbaijan) Sabail)
90	MF	BRA	Pessalli (to (Brazil) Paraná)
99	FW	BRA	Denílson (loan return to (Spain) Granada B)

Trialists: Note: Flags indicate national team as defined under FIFA eligibility rules; some limited exceptions apply. Players may hold more than one non-FIFA nationality.

No.	Pos.	Nation	Player
—	FW	PAR	Ramón Cardozo

== Friendlies ==
8 January 2017	Sivasspor (Turkey)	0 – 0	(Azerbaijan) Neftchi Baku	Antalya, Turkey
AZT (UTC+4)		Report		Stadium: Bellis Deluxe Hotel

11 January 2017	Nasaf Qarshi (Uzbekistan)	1 – 0	(Azerbaijan) Neftchi Baku	Antalya, Turkey
18:00 AZT (UTC+4)	82'	Report		Stadium: Bellis Deluxe Hotel

15 January 2017	Kukësi (Albania)	4 – 2	(Azerbaijan) Neftchi Baku	Antalya, Turkey
AZT (UTC+4)	Goal	Report	Folprecht 29'; Imamverdiyev 31'

17 January 2017	Tosno (Russia)	2 – 2	(Azerbaijan) Neftchi Baku	Antalya, Turkey
AZT (UTC+4)	Goal	Report	Cardozo 17'; Agayev 90+1'

== Competitions ==
=== Overview ===
Competition	First match	Last match	Starting round	Final position	Record							
Competition	First match	Last match	Starting round	Final position	Pld	W	D	L	GF	GA	GD	Win %
Premier League	6 August 2016	29 April 2017	Matchday 1	7th	28	9	2	17	24	45	−21	32.14
Azerbaijan Cup	2 December 2016	5 April 2017	Second round	Semifinal	5	2	1	2	6	4	+2	40.00
UEFA Europa League	30 June 2016	21 July 2016	First qualifying round	Second qualifying round	4	1	1	2	3	3	+0	25.00
Total					37	12	4	21	33	52	−19	32.43

Last updated: 29 April 2017
Source: Competitions

=== Premier League ===
==== Results summary ====
Overall								Home						Away					
Pld	W	D	L	GF	GA	GD	Pts	W	D	L	GF	GA	GD	W	D	L	GF	GA	GD
28	9	2	17	24	45	−21	29	6	1	7	15	20	−5	3	1	10	9	25	−16

Last updated: 29 April 2017.
Source: See Results

==== Results ====
6 August 2016 1	AZAL	0 – 2	Neftchi Baku	Baku
18:00 AZT (UTC+4)	E.Manafov (yellow card) 18'; R.Nasirli (red card) 36'	Report	Jairo (yellow card) 23' (yellow-red card) 36'; Badalov 60'; K.Gurbanov (yellow card) 65'; Hajiyev 70'	Stadium: AZAL Arena; Attendance: 350; Referee: Rahim Həsənov

14 August 2016 2	Neftchi Baku	0 – 1	Zira	Masazır
20:00 AZT (UTC+4)	Imamverdiyev (yellow card) 19'	Report	T.Khalilzade (yellow card) 14'; Đurić (yellow card) 40'; Mustafayev 43'	Stadium: Alinja Arena; Attendance: 750; Referee: Ramil Diniyev

21 August 2016 3	Qarabağ	3 – 0	Neftchi Baku	Masazır
20:00 AZT (UTC+4)	Jairo 24' (o.g.); M.Madatov 47'; El Jadeyaoui 80'	Report		Stadium: Alinja Arena; Attendance: 2,500; Referee: Aliyar Ağayev

10 September 2016 4	Neftchi Baku	0 – 8	Gabala	Masazır
20:00 AZT (UTC+4)	Abdullayev (yellow card) 75'	Report	Dabo 6', 16', 59'; Vernydub 10'; Ozobić 29'; Qurbanov 45+1', 83'; Jairo 70' (o.g.)	Stadium: Alinja Arena; Attendance: 1,500; Referee: Rahim Hasanov

18 September 2016 5	Inter Baku	2 – 1	Neftchi Baku	Baku
20:00 AZT (UTC+4)	Fardjad-Azad (yellow card) 45+1'; Aliyev 87', 90+3' (yellow card) 90+4'; Aghayev (yellow card) 90+3'	Report	Abdullayev 67' (pen.)	Stadium: Inter Arena; Attendance: 500; Referee: Fariz Yusifov

27 September 2016 6	Neftchi Baku	1 – 2	Sumgayit	Masazır
19:00 AZT (UTC+4)	Imamverdiyev 6'; Jairo (yellow card) 78'	Report	Y.Nabiyev 19'; S.Asadov 71'	Stadium: Alinja Arena; Attendance: 600; Referee: Ramil Diniyev

1 October 2016 7	Neftchi Baku	2 – 0	Kapaz	Masazır
19:00 AZT (UTC+4)	Denílson 14'; Țîră (yellow card) 31' (goal) 90+2'	Report	A.Karimov (yellow card) 30'; N.Gurbanov (yellow card) 42'; V.Beybalayev (yellow card) 54'; S.Rahimov (yellow card) 65'	Stadium: Alinja Arena; Attendance: 900; Referee: Omar Paşayev

16 October 2016 8	Zira	0 – 2	Neftchi Baku	Zirə
18:30 AZT (UTC+4)	Meza (yellow card) 15'; Mustafayev (yellow card) 24'; Krneta 43' (pen.); Naghiyev 50' (yellow card) 58'	Report	Denílson (yellow card) 24'; R.Mammadov (yellow card) 39' (yellow-red card) 47'; K.Gurbanov (yellow card) 90+2'	Stadium: Zira Olympic Sport Complex Stadium; Attendance: 500; Referee: Rahim Həsənov

25 October 2016 9	Neftchi Baku	0 – 2	Qarabağ	Baku
19:00 AZT (UTC+4)	Castillo (yellow card) 43'; Jairo (yellow card) 67'; Hajiyev (yellow card) 85'; Țîră (red card) 90+2'	Report	Amirguliyev 29'; Quintana (yellow card) 83'; Ndlovu (yellow card) 85'; Jairo 90' (o.g.)	Stadium: Bakcell Arena; Attendance: 1,500; Referee: Ramil Diniyev

28 October 2016 10	Gabala	4 – 1	Neftchi Baku	Qabala
15:00 AZT (UTC+4)	Zenjov 11', 59'; A.Mammadov (yellow card) 34' (goal) 62'; Eyyubov 77'; Vernydub (yellow card) 90+1'	Report	A.Abdullayev 49' (yellow card) 74'; Castillo (yellow card) 53'	Stadium: Gabala City Stadium; Attendance: 1,500; Referee: Aliyar Ağayev

5 November 2016 11	Neftchi Baku	2 – 1	Inter Baku	Baku
17:00 AZT (UTC+4)	Pessalli 54'; A.Abdullayev 61' (pen.); Castillo (yellow card) 64'; Bajković (yellow card) 90+3'	Report	Abışov (yellow card) 49'; Ramazanov (yellow card) 64'; Guliyev (yellow card) 66'; Hajiyev (yellow card) 67'; Khizanishvili 90+1' (yellow card) 90+3'	Stadium: Bakcell Arena; Attendance: 1,500; Referee: Ravan Həmzəzadə

20 November 2016 12	Sumgayit	2 – 0	Neftchi Baku	Sumqayit
14:00 AZT (UTC+4)	Guluzade 3' (yellow card) 43'; A.Mehdiyev (yellow card) 63'; Abbasov 75'	Report	Badalov (yellow card) 65'	Stadium: Kapital Bank Arena; Attendance: 1,300; Referee: Rahim Həsənov

27 November 2016 13	Kapaz	2 – 0	Neftchi Baku	Ganja
14:00 AZT (UTC+4)	O.Aliyev 27'; K.Diniyev (yellow card) 45+1'; Ebah 49'	Report	Hajiyev (yellow card) 64'	Stadium: Ganja City Stadium; Attendance: 8,350; Referee: Omar Paşayev

17 December 2016 14	Neftchi Baku	0 – 1	AZAL	Baku
16:00 AZT (UTC+4)	Jairo (yellow card) 63'	Report	I.Alakbarov (yellow card) 67'; D.Janelidze 80'; E.Suleymanov (yellow card) 82'; Amirjanov (yellow card) 88'	Stadium: Dalga Arena; Attendance: 150; Referee: Rauf Jabbarov

29 January 2017 15	Qarabağ	1 – 1	Neftchi Baku	Baku
17:30 AZT (UTC+4)	Ramazanov (yellow card) 60'; Ndlovu 72' (pen.)	Report	Imamverdiyev 13' (yellow card) 82'; Navalovski (yellow card) 50'; Hajiyev (yellow card) 67'; F.Muradbayli (yellow card) 81'	Stadium: Azersun Arena; Attendance: 3,200; Referee: Ramil Diniyev

3 February 2017 16	Gabala	1 – 0	Neftchi Baku	Qabala
17:00 AZT (UTC+4)	Stanković (yellow card) 39'; Sadiqov (yellow card) 47'; Abdullayev (yellow card) 57'; Subotić 77' (yellow card) 89'	Report	Abışov (yellow card) 76'	Stadium: Gabala City Stadium; Attendance: 1,200; Referee: Fariz Yusifov

9 February 2017 17	Inter Baku	1 – 3	Neftchi Baku	Baku
17:30 AZT (UTC+4)	Aliyev 35'; F.Bayramov (yellow card) 41'	Report	Lucas 13'; Alasgarov 17'; Herrera 58'; K.Gurbanov (yellow card) 89'	Stadium: Inter Arena; Attendance: 1,200; Referee: Aliyar Ağayev

13 February 2017 18	Neftchi Baku	1 – 0	Sumgayit	Baku
17:30 AZT (UTC+4)	Petrov (yellow card) 69'; Navalovski (yellow card) 76'; Bargas 86' (yellow card) 86'; M.Isayev (yellow card) 88'	Report	K.Najafov (yellow card) 82'	Stadium: Bakcell Arena; Attendance: 1,800; Referee: Fariz Yusifov

18 February 2017 19	Neftchi Baku	0 – 0	Kapaz	Baku
18:00 AZT (UTC+4)	Navalovski (yellow card) 90+2'	[ Report]	S.Rahimov (yellow card) 24'; S.Aliyev (yellow card) 90+1'	Stadium: Bakcell Arena; Attendance: 2,500; Referee: Rauf Jabbarov

27 February 2017 20	AZAL	0 – 1	Neftchi Baku	Baku
15:30 AZT (UTC+4)		Report	Lucas 4'; Alasgarov (yellow card) 31'; Folprecht (yellow card) 69'; Agayev (yellow card) 90+3'	Stadium: AZAL Arena; Attendance: 400; Referee: Omar Paşayev

5 March 2017 21	Neftchi Baku	1 – 2	Zira	Baku
18:00 AZT (UTC+4)	Lucas 60' (pen.); T.Jahangirov (yellow card) 90+3'	Report	V.Igbekoi (yellow card) 49'; Navalovski 62'; Đurić 79'	Stadium: Bakcell Arena; Attendance: 500; Referee: Rahim Həsənov

14 March 2017 22	Neftchi Baku	1 – 0	Gabala	Baku
20:00 AZT (UTC+4)	Alasgarov 40'; Petrov (yellow card) 67'; Bajković (yellow card) 89'	Report	Subotić (yellow card) 47'	Stadium: Bakcell Arena; Attendance: 1,100; Referee: Elvin Əsgərov

18 March 2017 23	Neftchi Baku	2 – 1	Inter Baku	Baku
19:37 AZT (UTC+4)	Bargas 42'; Hajiyev 70'	Report	Hajiyev 71'	Stadium: Bakcell Arena; Attendance: 2,500; Referee: Fariz Yusifov

2 April 2017 24	Sumgayit	2 – 0	Neftchi Baku	Sumqayit
16:30 AZT (UTC+4)	Gystarov (yellow card) 53'; B.Hasanalizade 60'; Yunanov 63'	Report	Imamverdiyev (yellow card) 74'	Stadium: Kapital Bank Arena; Attendance: 2,002; Referee: Rahim Həsənov

9 April 2017 25	Kapaz	2 – 0	Neftchi Baku	Ganja
16:00 AZT (UTC+4)	T.Akhundov 14' (pen.), 42' (pen.)	Report	M.Isayev (yellow card) 11'; Shukurov (yellow card) 81'	Stadium: Ganja City Stadium; Attendance: 10,000; Referee: Elvin Asgərov

15 April 2017 26	Neftchi Baku	4 – 0	AZAL	Baku
18:30 AZT (UTC+4)	Folprecht 13' (yellow card) 74'; Lucas 17'; Herrera 35'; Hajiyev 55'	Report	K.Huseynov (yellow card) 45'	Stadium: Bakcell Arena; Attendance: 1,000; Referee: Orkhan Məmmədov

23 April 2017 27	Zira	3 – 0	Neftchi Baku	Zirə
17:00 AZT (UTC+4)	Gadze (yellow card) 38'; T.Khalilzade 42'; Meza (yellow card) 44'; Mustafayev (yellow card) 59'; Latifu 63'	Report	Herrera 34' (yellow card) 34'; Abışov (yellow card) 39'; Alasgarov (yellow card) 45+1'; Folprecht (yellow card) 55'; Bajković (yellow card) 90'; Lucas 90+2'	Stadium: Zira Olympic Sport Complex Stadium; Attendance: 1,000; Referee: Fariz Yusifov
Note: On 25 April 2017, Zira were awarded a 3-0 victory over Neftchi Baku fielded 7 foreign players in this match.

29 April 2017 28	Neftchi Baku	1 – 2	Qarabağ	Baku
17:00 AZT (UTC+4)	M.Isayev (yellow card) 40'; Herrera 90'	Report	Ndlovu 48'; Abışov 60' (o.g.)	Stadium: Bakcell Arena; Attendance: 500; Referee: Omar Paşayev

==== League table ====
Pos	Team	Pld	W	D	L	GF	GA	GD	Pts	Qualification or relegation
4	Zira	28	10	9	9	29	26	+3	39	Qualification for the Europa League first qualifying round
5	Kapaz	28	9	9	10	24	27	−3	36	
6	Sumgayit	28	9	8	11	28	35	−7	35	
7	Neftçi Baku	28	9	2	17	24	45	−21	29	
8	AZAL (R)	28	1	7	20	13	50	−37	10	Relegation to the Azerbaijan First Division

Source: PFL (in Azerbaijani), UEFA, Soccerway
Rules for classification: 1) Points; 2) Head-to-head points; 3) Head-to-head goal difference; 4) Head-to-head goals scored; 5) Head-to-head away goals scored (only if two teams); 6) Goal difference; 7) Goals scored.
(R) Relegated

=== Azerbaijan Cup ===
2 December 2016 Second Round	Neftchi Baku	2 – 0	Sharurspor	Baku
17:00 AZT (UTC+4)	Muradbayli 14'; Isayev 22'; Yagublu (yellow card) 64'	Report	A.Ağayev (yellow card) 44'; J.Süleymanov (yellow card) 74'	Stadium: Bakcell Arena; Attendance: 300

13 December 2016 Quarterfinal First Leg	Zira	0 – 3	Neftchi Baku	Zirə
17:00 AZT (UTC+4)		Report	Pessalli 44', 58', 63'	Stadium: Zira Olympic Sport Complex Stadium; Attendance: 400; Referee: Aliyar Ağayev

21 December 2016 Quarterfinal Second Leg	Neftchi Baku	1 – 2 (4 – 2 agg.)	Zira	Baku
17:00 AZT (UTC+4)	Mammadov 40'; Yagublu (yellow card) 59'; Jairo (yellow card) 61'	Report	Đurić 34' (yellow card) 59'; Krneta (yellow card) 35'; Naghiyev (yellow card) 39'; Meza (yellow card) 57'; Novruzov 85'	Stadium: Bakcell Arena; Attendance: 200; Referee: Ramil Diniyev

30 March 2017 Semifinal First Leg	Neftchi Baku	0 – 2	Qarabağ	Baku
19:30 AZT (UTC+4)	Petrov (yellow card) 48'	Report	Muarem 13'; Ndlovu 28'; Abdullayev (yellow card) 72'; Magomedaliyev (yellow card) 89'	Stadium: Bakcell Arena; Attendance: 3,800; Referee: Aliyar Ağayev

5 April 2017 Semifinal Second Leg	Qarabağ	0 – 0 (2 – 0 agg.)	Neftchi Baku	Baku
19:30 AZT (UTC+4)		Report	Petrov (yellow card) 19'	Stadium: Tofiq Bahramov Republican Stadium; Attendance: 3,500; Referee: Aliyar Ağayev

=== UEFA Europa League ===
==== Qualifying rounds ====
30 June 2016 First qualifying round 1st leg	Balzan (Malta)	0 – 2	(Azerbaijan) Neftchi Baku	Paola (Note: Balzan played their home match at Hibernians Stadium, Paola, instead of their regular stadium National Stadium, Ta' Qali.), Malta
20:00 AZT (UTC+4)	Bezzina (yellow card) 53'; C.Brincat (yellow card) 72'; Grioli (yellow card) 86'	Report	Hajiyev 14'; Castillo (yellow card) 64'; Qurbanov 83' (pen.)	Stadium: Hibernians Stadium; Attendance: 357; Referee: Jovan Kaluđerović (Montenegro)

7 July 2016 First qualifying round 2nd leg	Neftchi Baku (Azerbaijan)	1 – 2 (3 – 2 agg.)	(Malta) Balzan	Baku, Azerbaijan
20:00 AZT (UTC+4)	Jairo 20' (yellow card) 53'; Melnjak (yellow card) 56'; Abdullayev (yellow card) 72'	Report	D.Grima (yellow card) 44'; Micallef 51', 67'; C.Brincat (yellow card) 83'; Serrano (yellow card) 85'; Anderson (yellow card) 86'; B.Kaljević (yellow card) 86'; Fenech (yellow card) 86'; Grioli (yellow card) 90+5'	Stadium: Bakcell Arena; Attendance: 7,650; Referee: Yaroslav Kozyk (Ukraine)

14 July 2016 Second qualifying round 1st leg	Neftchi Baku (Azerbaijan)	0 – 0	(North Macedonia) Shkëndija	Baku, Azerbaijan
20:00 AZT (UTC+4)	Agayev (yellow card) 48'	Report	Alimi (yellow card) 57'; Vujčić (yellow card) 75'	Stadium: Bakcell Arena; Attendance: 6,891; Referee: Sergey Tsinkevich (Belarus)

21 July 2016 Second qualifying round 2nd leg	Shkëndija (North Macedonia)	1 – 0 (1 – 0 agg.)	(Azerbaijan) Neftchi Baku	Skopje (Note: Shkëndija play their home matches at Philip II Arena, Skopje, instead of their regular stadium City Stadium, Tetovo.), Macedonia
22:00 AZT (UTC+4)	Ibraimi 31'; Júnior (yellow card) 90+2'	Report	Isayev (yellow card) 23'; Šikov (yellow card) 49' (yellow-red card) 72'; Qurbanov (yellow card) 72'; Jairo (yellow card) 88'	Stadium: Philip II Arena; Referee: Erik Lambrechts (Belgium)

== Squad statistics ==
As of match played 29 April 2017

=== Appearances and goals ===
No.	Pos	Nat	Player	Total		Premier League		Azerbaijan Cup		Europa League	
No.	Pos	Nat	Player	Apps	Goals	Apps	Goals	Apps	Goals	Apps	Goals
3	DF	(Brazil) BRA	Jairo	21	1	12+1	0	3+1	0	4	1
4	DF	(Azerbaijan) AZE	Rahil Mammadov	13	1	7+1	0	2	1	0+3	0
6	DF	(Czech Republic) CZE	Pavel Dreksa	12	0	11	0	1	0	0	0
7	MF	(Azerbaijan) AZE	Namiq Ələsgərov	12	2	12	2	0	0	0	0
8	MF	(Czech Republic) CZE	Zdeněk Folprecht	16	1	13+1	1	1+1	0	0	0
9	FW	(France) FRA	Hugo Bargas	15	2	3+10	2	1+1	0	0	0
10	MF	(Azerbaijan) AZE	Javid Imamverdiyev	27	2	13+7	2	2+1	0	0+4	0
11	FW	(Chile) CHI	Ignacio Herrera	15	3	12+1	3	2	0	0	0
12	FW	(Spain) ESP	Dani Segovia	15	4	11+2	4	1+1	0	0	0
13	MF	(Azerbaijan) AZE	Murad Agayev	15	0	6+2	0	1+2	0	4	0
15	DF	(Azerbaijan) AZE	Ruslan Abishov	9	0	9	0	0	0	0	0
17	MF	(Azerbaijan) AZE	Rahman Hajiyev	36	4	22+5	3	4+1	0	4	1
19	MF	(Azerbaijan) AZE	Fahmin Muradbayli	28	1	11+8	0	5	1	2+2	0
21	MF	(Azerbaijan) AZE	Agshin Gurbanli	2	0	0	0	0+1	0	0+1	0
22	DF	(Azerbaijan) AZE	Mahir Shukurov	8	0	4+3	0	0+1	0	0	0
23	MF	(Azerbaijan) AZE	Tarzin Jahangirov	22	0	13+4	0	3+2	0	0	0
25	MF	(Ukraine) UKR	Kyrylo Petrov	12	0	10	0	2	0	0	0
26	DF	(Azerbaijan) AZE	Kamal Gurbanov	10	0	5+5	0	0	0	0	0
27	DF	(Azerbaijan) AZE	Magsad Isayev	31	1	21+1	0	5	1	4	0
29	DF	(Georgia (country)) GEO	Giorgi Navalovski	16	0	13+1	0	2	0	0	0
33	GK	(Montenegro) MNE	Boban Bajković	19	0	14	0	5	0	0	0
49	FW	(Azerbaijan) AZE	Ibrahim Aliyev	3	0	0+2	0	0+1	0	0	0
53	GK	(Azerbaijan) AZE	Maksim Vaylo	7	0	6+1	0	0	0	0	0
80	MF	(Venezuela) VEN	Edson Castillo	27	0	16+4	0	3	0	4	0
95	DF	(Azerbaijan) AZE	Elvin Badalov	21	1	13+3	1	5	0	0	0
Players away from Neftchi Baku on loan:
20	DF	(Azerbaijan) AZE	Eltun Yagublu	7	0	3+1	0	3	0	0	0
88	MF	(Azerbaijan) AZE	Orkhan Gurbanli	1	0	0+1	0	0	0	0	0
Players who appeared for Neftchi Baku no longer at the club:
1	GK	(Croatia) CRO	Krševan Santini	12	0	8	0	0	0	4	0
6	DF	(North Macedonia) MKD	Vanče Šikov	10	0	6	0	0	0	4	0
7	MF	(Azerbaijan) AZE	Araz Abdullayev	17	3	9+2	3	1+1	0	4	0
8	MF	(Azerbaijan) AZE	Elshan Abdullayev	3	0	0	0	0	0	2+1	0
9	FW	(Romania) ROU	Cătălin Țîră	8	1	4+4	1	0	0	0	0
11	FW	(Azerbaijan) AZE	Ruslan Gurbanov	7	1	2+1	0	0	0	4	1
30	DF	(Croatia) CRO	Dario Melnjak	14	0	10	0	0	0	4	0
90	MF	(Brazil) BRA	Pessalli	10	4	3+4	1	3	3	0	0
99	FW	(Brazil) BRA	Denílson	9	1	7+2	1	0	0	0	0

=== Goal scorers ===
Place	Position	Nation	Number	Name	Premier League	Azerbaijan Cup	Europa League	Total
1	FW	(Spain)	12	Dani Segovia	4	0	0	4
1	MF	(Azerbaijan)	17	Rahman Hajiyev	3	0	1	4
1	MF	(Brazil)	90	Pessalli	1	3	0	4
4	MF	(Azerbaijan)	7	Araz Abdullayev	3	0	0	3
4	FW	(Chile)	11	Ignacio Herrera	3	0	0	3
6	MF	(Azerbaijan)	10	Javid Imamverdiyev	2	0	0	2
6	MF	(Azerbaijan)	7	Namiq Ələsgərov	2	0	0	2
6	FW	(France)	9	Hugo Bargas	2	0	0	2
9	DF	(Azerbaijan)	95	Elvin Badalov	1	0	0	1
9	FW	(Brazil)	99	Denílson	1	0	0	1
9	FW	(Romania)	9	Cătălin Țîră	1	0	0	1
9	MF	(Czech Republic)	8	Zdeněk Folprecht	1	0	0	1
9	MF	(Azerbaijan)	19	Fahmin Muradbayli	0	1	0	1
9	DF	(Azerbaijan)	27	Magsad Isayev	0	1	0	1
9	DF	(Azerbaijan)	4	Rahil Mammadov	0	1	0	1
9	FW	(Azerbaijan)	11	Ruslan Gurbanov	0	0	1	1
9	DF	(Brazil)	3	Jairo	0	0	1	1
				TOTALS	24	6	3	33

=== Clean sheets ===
Place	Position	Nation	Number	Name	Premier League	Azerbaijan Cup	Europa League	Total
1	GK	(Montenegro)	33	Boban Bajković	2	3	0	5
2	GK	(Croatia)	1	Krševan Santini	2	0	2	4
3	GK	(Azerbaijan)	53	Maksim Vaylo	3	0	0	3
				TOTALS	7	3	2	12

=== Disciplinary record ===
Number	Nation	Position	Name	Premier League		Azerbaijan Cup		Europa League		Total	
Number	Nation	Position	Name	Yellow card	Red card	Yellow card	Red card	Yellow card	Red card	Yellow card	Red card
3	(Brazil)	DF	Jairo	5	1	1	0	2	0	8	1
4	(Azerbaijan)	DF	Rahil Mammadov	2	1	0	0	0	0	2	1
7	(Azerbaijan)	MF	Namiq Ələsgərov	2	0	0	0	0	0	2	0
8	(Czech Republic)	MF	Zdeněk Folprecht	3	0	0	0	0	0	3	0
9	(France)	FW	Hugo Bargas	1	0	0	0	0	0	1	0
10	(Azerbaijan)	MF	Javid Imamverdiyev	3	0	0	0	0	0	3	0
11	(Chile)	FW	Ignacio Herrera	1	0	0	0	0	0	1	0
13	(Azerbaijan)	MF	Murad Agayev	1	0	0	0	1	0	2	0
15	(Azerbaijan)	DF	Ruslan Abishov	2	0	0	0	0	0	2	0
17	(Azerbaijan)	MF	Rahman Hajiyev	3	0	0	0	0	0	3	0
19	(Azerbaijan)	MF	Fahmin Muradbayli	1	0	0	0	0	0	1	0
22	(Azerbaijan)	DF	Mahir Shukurov	1	0	0	0	0	0	1	0
23	(Azerbaijan)	MF	Tarzin Jahangirov	1	0	0	0	0	0	1	0
25	(Ukraine)	MF	Kyrylo Petrov	2	0	2	0	0	0	4	0
26	(Azerbaijan)	DF	Kamal Gurbanov	3	0	0	0	0	0	3	0
27	(Azerbaijan)	DF	Magsad Isayev	3	0	0	0	1	0	4	0
29	(Georgia (country))	DF	Giorgi Navalovski	3	0	0	0	0	0	3	0
33	(Montenegro)	GK	Boban Bajković	2	0	0	0	1	0	3	0
80	(Venezuela)	MF	Edson Castillo	3	0	0	0	1	0	4	0
95	(Azerbaijan)	DF	Elvin Badalov	1	0	0	0	0	0	1	0
Players away on loan:
20	(Azerbaijan)	DF	Eltun Yagublu	0	0	2	0	0	0	2	0
Players who left Neftçi during the season:
6	(North Macedonia)	DF	Vanče Šikov	0	0	0	0	2	1	1	0
7	(Azerbaijan)	MF	Araz Abdullayev	2	0	0	0	0	0	2	0
8	(Azerbaijan)	MF	Elshan Abdullayev	0	0	0	0	1	0	1	0
9	(Romania)	FW	Cătălin Țîră	1	1	0	0	0	0	1	1
11	(Azerbaijan)	FW	Ruslan Gurbanov	0	0	0	0	1	0	1	0
30	(Croatia)	DF	Dario Melnjak	0	0	0	0	1	0	1	0
99	(Brazil)	FW	Denílson	1	0	0	0	0	0	1	0
			TOTALS	47	3	4	0	10	1	61	4
