= List of Azerbaijan football transfers summer 2016 =

This is a list of Azerbaijan football transfers in the summer transfer window, 9 June - 31 August 2016, by club. Only clubs of the 2016–17 Azerbaijan Premier League are included.

== Azerbaijan Premier League 2016-17 ==
=== AZAL ===
In: Note: Flags indicate national team as defined under FIFA eligibility rules; some limited exceptions apply. Players may hold more than one non-FIFA nationality.

No.	Pos.	Nation	Player
9	FW	AZE	Royal Najafov (from (Azerbaijan) MOIK Baku)
12	MF	AZE	Mahsun Gambarli (from (Azerbaijan) Khazar Lankaran)
15	DF	HKG	Brian Fok (loan from (China) Shanghai Greenland Shenhua)
16	DF	IRN	Ashkan Feizi
17	MF	AZE	Rashad Abdullayev (from (Azerbaijan) Zira)
18	DF	AZE	Ruslan Amirjanov (from (Azerbaijan) Inter Baku)
19	MF	AZE	Elnur Suleymanov (from (Azerbaijan) Inter Baku)
23	GK	AZE	Aqil Mammadov (from (Azerbaijan) Neftçi Baku)
55	MF	AZE	Geyrat Aliyev (from (Azerbaijan) Baku)

Out: Note: Flags indicate national team as defined under FIFA eligibility rules; some limited exceptions apply. Players may hold more than one non-FIFA nationality.

No.	Pos.	Nation	Player
2	DF	AZE	Rail Malikov (to (Azerbaijan) Sumgayit)
7	MF	AZE	Tarlan Khalilov (to (Azerbaijan) Sharurspor)
8	MF	AZE	Seymur Asadov (to (Azerbaijan) Sumgayit)
9	FW	AZE	Aydin Gasimov (to (Azerbaijan) Qaradağ Lökbatan)
15	FW	AZE	Rufat Musayev
16	GK	MDA	Stanislav Namașco (to (Greece) Levadiakos)
19	FW	AZE	Mahammad Badalbayli (to (Azerbaijan) MOIK Baku)
21	MF	AZE	Murad Sattarli (to (Azerbaijan) Zira)
27	MF	GEO	Aleksandre Guruli

=== Gabala ===
In: Note: Flags indicate national team as defined under FIFA eligibility rules; some limited exceptions apply. Players may hold more than one non-FIFA nationality.

No.	Pos.	Nation	Player
7	MF	GEO	Nika Kvekveskiri (from (Azerbaijan) Inter Baku)
10	FW	AZE	Ruslan Qurbanov (from (Azerbaijan) Neftchi Baku)
14	MF	AZE	Javid Huseynov
18	FW	FRA	Bagaliy Dabo (from (France) US Créteil)
19	MF	CRO	Filip Ozobić (from (Croatia) Slaven Belupo)
27	MF	LBR	Theo Weeks (loan from (Cyprus) Ermis Aradippou)
30	MF	CRO	Petar Franjić (from (Croatia) RNK Split)
39	DF	AZE	Sadig Guliyev (loan return from (Azerbaijan) Zira)
88	MF	AZE	Tellur Mutallimov (loan return from (Azerbaijan) Zira)

Out: Note: Flags indicate national team as defined under FIFA eligibility rules; some limited exceptions apply. Players may hold more than one non-FIFA nationality.

No.	Pos.	Nation	Player
1	GK	AZE	Andrey Popoviç
5	DF	AZE	Pavlo Pashayev (to (Ukraine) Stal)
7	FW	BIH	Ermin Zec (to (Turkey) Kardemir Karabükspor)
10	MF	BRA	Dodô (to (Brazil) Joinville)
16	MF	AZE	Emin Zamanov (loan to (Azerbaijan) Kapaz)
18	MF	AZE	Vadim Abdullayev (to (Azerbaijan) Zagatala)
19	MF	UKR	Oleksiy Gai (to (Russia) Kuban Krasnodar)
21	DF	AZE	Arif Dashdemirov (to (Azerbaijan) Qarabağ)
23	MF	AZE	Shamil Jamaleddinov (to (Azerbaijan) Shamkir)
66	MF	AZE	Samir Zargarov (to (Azerbaijan) Inter Baku)
69	FW	UKR	Oleksiy Antonov
74	DF	AZE	Yusif Nabiyev (loan to (Azerbaijan) Sumgayit)
87	DF	AZE	Ruslan Abışov (to (Azerbaijan) Inter Baku)
—	MF	AZE	Tarzin Jahangirov (to (Azerbaijan) Neftchi Baku, previously on loan to (Azerbaijan) Zira)

=== Inter Baku ===
In: Note: Flags indicate national team as defined under FIFA eligibility rules; some limited exceptions apply. Players may hold more than one non-FIFA nationality.

No.	Pos.	Nation	Player
1	GK	AZE	Salahat Aghayev (from (Azerbaijan) Sumgayit)
4	DF	AZE	Slavik Alkhasov (from (Azerbaijan) Sumgayit)
6	MF	AZE	Samir Zargarov (from (Azerbaijan) Gabala)
9	FW	AZE	Pardis Fardjad-Azad (from (Azerbaijan) Sumgayit)
13	GK	AZE	Orkhan Sadigli (from (Azerbaijan) Khazar Lankaran)
15	DF	AZE	Ruslan Abışov (from (Azerbaijan) Gabala)
27	DF	ROU	Adrian Scarlatache (from (Romania) Astra Giurgiu)
33	DF	AZE	Tarlan Guliyev (from (Azerbaijan) Qarabağ)
42	DF	AZE	İbrahim Gadirzade (from (Azerbaijan) Khazar Lankaran)
55	FW	AZE	Aghabala Ramazanov (from (Azerbaijan) Sumgayit)
88	MF	AZE	Mammad Guliyev (from (Azerbaijan) Ravan Baku)
99	DF	AZE	Rijat Garayev (from (Azerbaijan) Sumgayit)

Out: Note: Flags indicate national team as defined under FIFA eligibility rules; some limited exceptions apply. Players may hold more than one non-FIFA nationality.

No.	Pos.	Nation	Player
1	GK	AZE	Kamran Aghayev (to (Portugal) Boavista)
4	DF	GEO	Lasha Kasradze (to (Georgia (country)) Sioni Bolnisi)
6	DF	GEO	Lasha Salukvadze (to (Georgia (country)) Dila Gori)
7	MF	GEO	Nika Kvekveskiri (to (Azerbaijan) Gabala)
12	DF	AZE	Ruslan Amirjanov (to (Azerbaijan) AZAL)
17	FW	AZE	Vüqar Nadirov (to (Azerbaijan) Qarabağ)
20	FW	UKR	Yuriy Fomenko (to (Armenia) Alashkert)
23	MF	PAR	César Meza Colli (to (Azerbaijan) Zira)
39	MF	AZE	Elnur Suleymanov (to (Azerbaijan) AZAL)
49	MF	AZE	Suleyman Ahmadov (to (Azerbaijan) Sumgayit)
79	GK	GEO	Giorgi Lomaia (to (Georgia (country)) Dinamo Tbilisi)
96	GK	AZE	Elshan Poladov (to (Azerbaijan) Shamkir)
—	FW	AZE	Tural Gurbatov (to (Azerbaijan) Kapaz, previously on loan to (Azerbaijan) Khazar Lankaran)

=== Kapaz ===
In: Note: Flags indicate national team as defined under FIFA eligibility rules; some limited exceptions apply. Players may hold more than one non-FIFA nationality.

No.	Pos.	Nation	Player
7	DF	AZE	Vugar Beybalayev (from (Azerbaijan) Khazar Lankaran)
9	FW	AZE	Tural Gurbatov (from (Azerbaijan) Inter Baku)
16	MF	AZE	Emin Zamanov (loan from (Azerbaijan) Gabala)
17	MF	AZE	Nijat Gurbanov (from (Azerbaijan) Zira)
21	DF	AZE	Novruz Mammadov (from (Azerbaijan) Ravan Baku)
36	DF	BRA	Renan (from (Portugal) Gil Vicente)
77	FW	POR	Serginho (from (Portugal) Trofense)
30	GK	AZE	Davud Karimi (from (Azerbaijan) Ağsu)

Out: Note: Flags indicate national team as defined under FIFA eligibility rules; some limited exceptions apply. Players may hold more than one non-FIFA nationality.

No.	Pos.	Nation	Player
3	DF	AZE	Tarlan Guliyev (loan return to (Azerbaijan) Qarabağ)
4	MF	AZE	Elvin Jabrayilli (to (Azerbaijan) Qaradağ Lökbatan)
7	MF	BRA	Juninho
8	MF	AZE	Budag Nasirov (loan return to (Azerbaijan) Sumgayit)
9	MF	AZE	Namig Alasgarov (loan return to (Azerbaijan) Qarabağ)
21	DF	AZE	Khazar Garibov (to (Azerbaijan) Bakili)
27	FW	AZE	Bakhtiyar Soltanov (to (Azerbaijan) Qaradağ Lökbatan)

=== Neftchi Baku ===
In: Note: Flags indicate national team as defined under FIFA eligibility rules; some limited exceptions apply. Players may hold more than one non-FIFA nationality.

No.	Pos.	Nation	Player
1	GK	CRO	Krševan Santini (from (Cyprus) Enosis)
6	DF	MKD	Vanče Šikov (from Austria Wien)
9	FW	ROU	Cătălin Țîră (from (Romania) Rapid București)
13	MF	AZE	Murad Agayev (from (Azerbaijan) Sumgayit)
20	DF	AZE	Eltun Yagublu (loan from (Azerbaijan) Qarabağ)
22	DF	AZE	Mahir Shukurov (Free agent)
23	MF	AZE	Tarzin Jahangirov (from (Azerbaijan) Gabala)
30	DF	CRO	Dario Melnjak (loan from (Belgium) Lokeren)
33	GK	MNE	Boban Bajković (Free agent)
80	MF	VEN	Edson Castillo (from (Venezuela) Mineros)
88	MF	AZE	Orkhan Gurbanli (loan return from (Latvia) Daugavpils)
90	MF	BRA	Pessalli (Free agent)
99	FW	BRA	Denílson (loan from (Brazil) Fluminense)

Out: Note: Flags indicate national team as defined under FIFA eligibility rules; some limited exceptions apply. Players may hold more than one non-FIFA nationality.

No.	Pos.	Nation	Player
1	GK	AZE	Aqil Mammadov (to (Azerbaijan) AZAL)
5	DF	ESP	Melli (to (Spain) Reus Deportiu)
6	DF	BRA	Ailton (loan return to (Brazil) Fluminense)
9	FW	CHI	Nicolás Canales (to (Kazakhstan) Okzhetpes)
11	FW	AZE	Ruslan Qurbanov (to (Azerbaijan) Gabala)
14	FW	AZE	Magomed Kurbanov (loan return to (Azerbaijan) Sumgayit)
15	MF	PAR	Éric Ramos (to (Paraguay) Rubio Ñu)
18	MF	AZE	Elshan Rzazade (to (Azerbaijan) Mil-Muğan)
20	FW	ESP	Añete (to (Bulgaria) Levski Sofia)
22	FW	AZE	Mirabdulla Abbasov (loan to (Azerbaijan) Sumgayit, previously on loan to (Latvia) Daugavpils)

=== Qarabağ ===
In: Note: Flags indicate national team as defined under FIFA eligibility rules; some limited exceptions apply. Players may hold more than one non-FIFA nationality.

No.	Pos.	Nation	Player
6	FW	RSA	Dino Ndlovu (from (Cyprus) Anorthosis Famagusta)
17	FW	AZE	Namig Alasgarov (loan return from (Azerbaijan) Kapaz)
21	DF	AZE	Arif Dashdemirov (from (Azerbaijan) Gabala)
42	DF	AZE	Ilyas Safarzade (from (Azerbaijan) Khazar Lankaran)
64	GK	AZE	Emil Balayev (from (Germany) Eintracht Frankfurt)
71	FW	AZE	Vüqar Nadirov (from (Azerbaijan) Inter Baku)

Out: Note: Flags indicate national team as defined under FIFA eligibility rules; some limited exceptions apply. Players may hold more than one non-FIFA nationality.

No.	Pos.	Nation	Player
1	GK	AZE	Farhad Valiyev (to (Azerbaijan) Sumgayit)
4	DF	AZE	Eltun Yagublu (loan to (Azerbaijan) Neftchi Baku)
6	MF	AZE	Vugar Mustafayev (loan to (Azerbaijan) Zira)
7	MF	AZE	Namiq Yusifov (retired)
19	DF	AZE	Azer Salahli (loan to (Azerbaijan) Sumgayit)
77	MF	AZE	Javid Taghiyev (to (Azerbaijan) Zira)
90	FW	SWE	Samuel Armenteros (to (Netherlands) Heracles)

=== Sumgayit ===
In: Note: Flags indicate national team as defined under FIFA eligibility rules; some limited exceptions apply. Players may hold more than one non-FIFA nationality.

No.	Pos.	Nation	Player
1	GK	AZE	Farhad Valiyev (from (Azerbaijan) Qarabağ)
2	DF	AZE	Rail Malikov (from (Azerbaijan) AZAL)
5	MF	AZE	Seymur Asadov (from (Azerbaijan) AZAL)
10	FW	AZE	Magomed Kurbanov (loan return from (Azerbaijan) Neftçi Baku)
11	MF	IRN	Ebrahim Abednezhad (from (Iran) Tractor Sazi)
17	DF	AZE	Vaguf Gulaliyev (from (Azerbaijan) Khazar Lankaran)
18	MF	AZE	Suleyman Ahmadov (from (Azerbaijan) Inter Baku)
19	DF	AZE	Azer Salahli (loan from (Azerbaijan) Qarabağ)
21	MF	RUS	Nasir Abilayev (from (Russia) Lokomotiv Moscow)
22	FW	AZE	Mirabdulla Abbasov (loan from (Azerbaijan) Neftçi Baku)
38	MF	AZE	Ülvi Suleymanov (from (Azerbaijan) Zira)
42	MF	AZE	Kamran Abdullazade (from (Azerbaijan) Khazar Lankaran)
66	MF	IRN	Afshin Esmaeilzadeh (from (Iran) Giti Pasand)
74	DF	AZE	Yusif Nabiyev (loan from (Azerbaijan) Gabala)

Out: Note: Flags indicate national team as defined under FIFA eligibility rules; some limited exceptions apply. Players may hold more than one non-FIFA nationality.

No.	Pos.	Nation	Player
1	GK	AZE	Salahat Aghayev (to (Azerbaijan) Inter Baku)
2	DF	AZE	Slavik Alkhasov (to (Azerbaijan) Inter Baku)
5	DF	AZE	Jamil Hajiyev (to (Azerbaijan) Zira)
7	FW	AZE	Pardis Fardjad-Azad (to (Azerbaijan) Inter Baku)
10	MF	AZE	Uğur Pamuk (to (Turkey) Manisaspor)
12	GK	AZE	Tural Abbaszade (to (Azerbaijan) Ravan Baku)
13	MF	AZE	Murad Agayev (to (Azerbaijan) Neftchi Baku)
15	DF	AZE	Rijat Garayev (to (Azerbaijan) Inter Baku)
22	MF	AZE	Tofig Mikayilov (to (Azerbaijan) Mil-Muğan)
55	FW	AZE	Aghabala Ramazanov (to (Azerbaijan) Inter Baku)
99	DF	AZE	Rasim Ramaldanov (to (Georgia (country)) Kolkheti-1913)
—	MF	AZE	Budag Nasirov (to (Portugal) Sporting CP, previously on loan to (Azerbaijan) Kapaz)

=== Zira ===
In: Note: Flags indicate national team as defined under FIFA eligibility rules; some limited exceptions apply. Players may hold more than one non-FIFA nationality.

No.	Pos.	Nation	Player
6	MF	AZE	Vugar Mustafayev (loan from (Azerbaijan) Qarabağ)
7	MF	ALB	Gerhard Progni (from (Albania) Skënderbeu)
8	MF	SRB	Milan Đurić (from (Croatia) Istra)
18	MF	AZE	Tural Jalilov (from (Azerbaijan) Khazar Lankaran)
20	MF	PAR	César Meza Colli (from (Azerbaijan) Inter Baku)
21	MF	AZE	Murad Sattarli (from (Azerbaijan) AZAL)
44	DF	POR	Miguel Lourenço (loan from (Portugal) Vitória de Setúbal)
55	DF	AZE	Jamil Hajiyev (from (Azerbaijan) Sumgayit)
77	DF	AZE	Yamin Agakerimzade (from (Azerbaijan) Ravan Baku)
92	MF	AZE	Javid Taghiyev (from (Azerbaijan) Qarabağ)
99	FW	UKR	Yasyn Khamid (from (Azerbaijan) Ravan Baku)

Out: Note: Flags indicate national team as defined under FIFA eligibility rules; some limited exceptions apply. Players may hold more than one non-FIFA nationality.

No.	Pos.	Nation	Player
2	DF	NGA	Chimezie Mbah
8	MF	AZE	Tarzin Jahangirov (loan return to (Azerbaijan) Gabala)
9	FW	SLV	Nelson Bonilla (to (Portugal) Nacional)
10	FW	MNE	Igor Ivanović (to (Montenegro) Sutjeska)
14	MF	AZE	Tellur Mutallimov (loan return to (Azerbaijan) Gabala)
17	MF	AZE	Nijat Gurbanov (to (Azerbaijan) Kapaz)
27	MF	AZE	Rashad Abdullayev (to (Azerbaijan) AZAL)
32	MF	ESP	Tato (to (Spain) Escobedo)
33	MF	BRA	Diego Souza
39	DF	AZE	Sadig Guliyev (loan return to (Azerbaijan) Gabala)
64	MF	AZE	Ülvi Suleymanov (to (Azerbaijan) Sumgayit)
77	DF	AZE	Ruslan Poladov (to (Azerbaijan) Shamkir)
