= 2016–17 FC Inter Baku season =

Inter Baku
2016–17 season
- President: Jahangir Hajiyev
- Manager: Zaur Svanadze
- Stadium: Inter Arena
- Premier League: 3rd
- Azerbaijan Cup: Semifinal vs Gabala
- Top goalscorer: League: Rauf Aliyev (11); All: Rauf Aliyev (14)
Home colours	Away colours

The Inter Baku 2016–17 season was Inter Baku's sixteenth Azerbaijan Premier League season, and their second season under manager Zaur Svanadze. They finished the season in third place, and were knocked out of the Azerbaijan Cup at the semifinal stage by Gabala.

== Squad ==
As of 6 January 2017

Note: Flags indicate national team as defined under FIFA eligibility rules; some limited exceptions apply. Players may hold more than one non-FIFA nationality.

No.	Pos.	Nation	Player
1	GK	AZE	Salahat Aghayev
2	DF	AZE	Sertan Tashkin
3	DF	BRA	Denis Silva
4	DF	AZE	Slavik Alkhasov
6	MF	AZE	Samir Zargarov
8	MF	AZE	Nizami Hajiyev (captain)
9	FW	AZE	Pardis Fardjad-Azad
10	MF	AZE	Elnur Abdullayev
11	FW	AZE	Rauf Aliyev
12	DF	AZE	Ruslan Amirjanov
13	GK	AZE	Orkhan Sadigli
14	DF	GEO	Zurab Khizanishvili
16	GK	AZE	Shahin Zakiyev

No.	Pos.	Nation	Player
17	DF	AZE	Abbas Huseynov
18	MF	AZE	Mansur Nahavandi
19	MF	AZE	Mirhuseyn Seyidov
22	DF	AZE	Ilkin Qirtimov
24	MF	AZE	Fuad Bayramov
27	DF	ROU	Adrian Scarlatache
33	DF	AZE	Tarlan Guliyev
45	FW	AZE	Ilkin Sadigov
77	MF	AZE	Mirsahib Abbasov
88	MF	AZE	Mammad Guliyev
98	FW	AZE	Gara Garayev
—	DF	AZE	Rijat Garayev

== Transfers ==
=== Summer ===
In: Note: Flags indicate national team as defined under FIFA eligibility rules; some limited exceptions apply. Players may hold more than one non-FIFA nationality.

No.	Pos.	Nation	Player
1	GK	AZE	Salahat Aghayev (from (Azerbaijan) Sumgayit)
4	DF	AZE	Slavik Alkhasov (from (Azerbaijan) Sumgayit)
6	MF	AZE	Samir Zargarov (from (Azerbaijan) Gabala)
9	FW	AZE	Pardis Fardjad-Azad (from (Azerbaijan) Sumgayit)
13	GK	AZE	Orkhan Sadigli (from (Azerbaijan) Khazar Lankaran)
15	DF	AZE	Ruslan Abışov (from (Azerbaijan) Gabala)
27	DF	ROU	Adrian Scarlatache (from (Romania) Astra Giurgiu)
33	DF	AZE	Tarlan Guliyev (from (Azerbaijan) Qarabağ)
55	FW	AZE	Aghabala Ramazanov (from (Azerbaijan) Sumgayit)
88	MF	AZE	Mammad Guliyev (from (Azerbaijan) Ravan Baku)
—	DF	AZE	Rijat Garayev (from (Azerbaijan) Sumgayit)
—	MF	AZE	Ilter Tashkin (from (Germany) Neustrelitz)

Out: Note: Flags indicate national team as defined under FIFA eligibility rules; some limited exceptions apply. Players may hold more than one non-FIFA nationality.

No.	Pos.	Nation	Player
1	GK	AZE	Kamran Aghayev (to (Portugal) Boavista)
4	DF	GEO	Lasha Kasradze (to (Georgia (country)) Sioni Bolnisi)
6	DF	GEO	Lasha Salukvadze (to (Georgia (country)) Dila Gori)
7	MF	GEO	Nika Kvekveskiri (to (Azerbaijan) Gabala)
17	FW	AZE	Vüqar Nadirov (to (Azerbaijan) Qarabağ)
20	FW	UKR	Yuriy Fomenko (to (Armenia) Alashkert)
23	MF	PAR	César Meza Colli (to (Azerbaijan) Zira)
79	GK	GEO	Giorgi Lomaia (to (Georgia (country)) Dinamo Tbilisi)
96	GK	AZE	Elshan Poladov
—	FW	AZE	Tural Gurbatov (to (Azerbaijan) Kapaz, previously on loan to (Azerbaijan) Khazar Lankaran)
—	MF	AZE	Ilter Tashkin (to (Turkey) Denizlispor)

=== Winter ===
In: Note: Flags indicate national team as defined under FIFA eligibility rules; some limited exceptions apply. Players may hold more than one non-FIFA nationality.

No.	Pos.	Nation	Player

Out: Note: Flags indicate national team as defined under FIFA eligibility rules; some limited exceptions apply. Players may hold more than one non-FIFA nationality.

No.	Pos.	Nation	Player
15	DF	AZE	Ruslan Abışov (to (Azerbaijan) Neftchi Baku)
55	FW	AZE	Aghabala Ramazanov (to (Azerbaijan) Qarabağ)

== Friendlies ==
19 January 2017	Istiklol (Tajikistan)	1 – 2	(Azerbaijan) Inter Baku	Antalya, Turkey
19:00 AZT (UTC+4)	Fatkhuloev 54'; Vasiev (yellow card)	Summary	Seyidov 56'; Fardjad-Azad 77'; Scarlatache (yellow card)	Stadium: The Sense Deluxe Hotel; Referee: Vladimir Akodis (Ukraine)

== Competitions ==
=== Azerbaijan Premier League ===
==== Results summary ====
Overall								Home						Away					
Pld	W	D	L	GF	GA	GD	Pts	W	D	L	GF	GA	GD	W	D	L	GF	GA	GD
28	11	10	7	38	32	+6	43	7	4	3	22	17	+5	4	6	4	16	15	+1

Last updated: 29 April 2017.
Source: See Results

==== Results ====
7 August 2016 1	Inter Baku	2 – 1	Qarabağ	Baku
20:00 AZT (UTC+4)	O.Sadigli (yellow card) 44'; Guliyev (yellow card) 52'; Abışov (yellow card) 69' (goal) 70', 75'; Hajiyev (yellow card) 90+1'; Aghayev (yellow card) 90+3'	Report	Reynaldo 11'	Stadium: Inter Arena; Attendance: 2,200; Referee: Aliyar Ağayev

12 August 2016 2	Gabala	0 – 0	Inter Baku	Baku
20:00 AZT (UTC+4)	Santos (yellow card) 6'; Abbasov (yellow card) 31'; Weeks (yellow card) 86'; Zenjov (yellow card) 90'	Report	F.Bayramov (yellow card) 21'; Qirtimov (yellow card) 50'; S.Zargarov (yellow card) 84'; Khizanishvili (yellow card) 86'	Stadium: Dalga Arena; Attendance: 500; Referee: Rauf Jabbarov

19 August 2016 3	Inter Baku	2 – 2	Kapaz	Baku
21:00 AZT (UTC+4)	F.Bayramov (yellow card) 19'; Scarlatache 24'; Khizanishvili (yellow card) 27'; Aghayev (yellow card) 43'; Aliyev (yellow card) 45+2'; Qirtimov (yellow card) 77'; Abışov 90'; S.Zargarov (yellow card) 90+3'	Report	Serginho (yellow card) 23'; T.Akhundov 28' (pen.); Ebah 73'; S.Aliyev (yellow card) 89'	Stadium: Inter Arena; Attendance: 500; Referee: Omar Paşayev

11 September 2016 4	Sumgayit	1 – 2	Inter Baku	Sumqayit
20:30 AZT (UTC+4)	Javadov 90+1'	Report	Denis 2'; Khizanishvili (yellow card) 30'; F.Bayramov (yellow card) 45'; Ramazanov 61'; Hajiyev (yellow card) 90+2'	Stadium: Kapital Bank Arena; Attendance: 1,350; Referee: Aliyar Ağayev

18 September 2016 5	Inter Baku	2 – 1	Neftchi Baku	Baku
20:00 AZT (UTC+4)	Fardjad-Azad (yellow card) 45+1'; Aliyev 87', 90+3' (yellow card) 90+4'; Aghayev (yellow card) 90+3'	Report	Abdullayev 67' (pen.)	Stadium: Inter Arena; Attendance: 500; Referee: Fariz Yusifov

24 September 2016 6	AZAL	1 – 3	Inter Baku	Baku
16:00 AZT (UTC+4)	G.Magomedov (yellow card) 31'; T.Hümbatov (yellow card) 45'; Kvirtia 54'	Report	Hajiyev 45+1' (pen.); Aliyev 63'; Ramazanov 65' (yellow card) 76'	Stadium: AZAL Arena; Attendance: 300; Referee: Aliyar Ağayev

30 September 2016 7	Inter Baku	1 – 1	Zira	Baku
15:00 AZT (UTC+4)	Ramazanov 22'; E.Abdullayev (yellow card) 31'	Report	Igbekoyi (yellow card) 58' (goal) 90+2'; T.Khalilzade (yellow card) 63'; Mustafayev (yellow card) 74'; Krneta (yellow card) 77'	Stadium: Inter Arena; Attendance: 500; Referee: Fariz Yusifov

15 October 2016 8	Inter Baku	1 – 1	Gabala	Baku
16:00 AZT (UTC+4)	Ramazanov 48'; Abışov (yellow card) 50'; Hajiyev (yellow card) 60'; Qirtimov (yellow card) 61'; F.Bayramov (yellow card) 78'	Report	Ozobić (yellow card) 28'; Zenjov 69'	Stadium: Inter Arena; Attendance: 700; Referee: Ravan Həmzəzadə

23 October 2016 9	Kapaz	0 – 0	Inter Baku	Ganja
14:30 AZT (UTC+4)	Renan (yellow card) 8'; Ebah (yellow card) 36'	Report	E.Abdullayev (yellow card) 35'; Ramazanov (yellow card) 64'; Denis (yellow card) 71'; Guliyev (yellow card) 78'; S.Alkhasov (yellow card) 82'; Fardjad-Azad (yellow card) 88'	Stadium: Ganja City Stadium; Attendance: 10,650; Referee: Fariz Yusifov

30 October 2016 10	Inter Baku	3 – 1	Sumgayit	Baku
16:00 AZT (UTC+4)	Khizanishvili 21'; Fardjad-Azad (yellow card) 25'; Hajiyev 55', 80'	Report	M.Abbasov 3' (yellow card) 59'; Malikov (yellow card) 58'	Stadium: Inter Arena; Attendance: 200; Referee: Omar Paşayev

5 November 2016 11	Neftchi Baku	2 – 1	Inter Baku	Baku
16:00 AZT (UTC+4)	Pessalli 54'; A.Abdullayev 61' (pen.); Castillo (yellow card) 64'; Bajković (yellow card) 90+3'	Report	Abışov (yellow card) 49'; Ramazanov (yellow card) 64'; Guliyev (yellow card) 66'; Hajiyev (yellow card) 67'; Khizanishvili 90+1' (yellow card) 90+3'	Stadium: Bakcell Arena; Attendance: 1,500; Referee: Ravan Həmzəzadə

20 November 2016 12	Inter Baku	3 – 0	AZAL	Baku
16:00 AZT (UTC+4)	S.Alkhasov (yellow card) 14' (goal) 65'; Abışov 23' (pen.); Qirtimov 56'; Guliyev (yellow card) 82'	Report	Fok (yellow card) 22' (yellow-red card) 68'; T.Novruzov (yellow card) 56'; G.Magomedov (yellow card) 82'; E.Huseynov (yellow card) 89'	Stadium: Inter Arena; Attendance: 300; Referee: Aliyar Ağayev

28 November 2016 13	Zira	1 – 1	Inter Baku	Zirə
17:00 AZT (UTC+4)	Mustafayev (yellow card) 30'; Meza (yellow card) 63'; Mammadov (yellow card) 77'; Krneta 90+3' (yellow card) 90+3'	Report	Fardjad-Azad (yellow card) 19'; Denis (yellow card) 30'; Aghayev (yellow card) 30'; Abışov 48'; Scarlatache (yellow card) 62' (yellow-red card) 66'; Qirtimov (yellow card) 63'	Stadium: Zira Olympic Sport Complex Stadium; Attendance: 1,100; Referee: Orkhan Məmmədov

17 December 2016 14	Qarabağ	0 – 0	Inter Baku	Baku
17:00 AZT (UTC+4)	Quintana (yellow card) 44'; Garayev (yellow card) 62'	Report	Aliyev (yellow card) 32'; Guliyev (yellow card) 37'; Khizanishvili (yellow card) 82'	Stadium: Azersun Arena; Attendance: 500; Referee: Fariz Yusifov

28 January 2017 15	Inter Baku	4 – 1	Kapaz	Baku
17:00 AZT (UTC+4)	F.Bayramov (yellow card) 43' (goal) 53'; Hajiyev 45+2'; A.Huseynov 60'; E.Abdullayev (yellow card) 65'; Aliyev 79'	Report	T.Akhundov (yellow card) 25' (goal) 39'	Stadium: Inter Arena; Attendance: 300; Referee: Rahim Həsənov

4 February 2017 16	Sumgayit	2 – 2	Inter Baku	Sumqayit
16:30 AZT (UTC+4)	Hüseynov (yellow card) 8'; M.Abbasov 19' (pen.); Malikov (yellow card) 60'; N.Mukhtarov 90+1'	Report	Guliyev (yellow card) 18'; Qirtimov 49'; S.Alkhasov (yellow card) 57'; E.Abdullayev (yellow card) 69'; Aliyev 90'	Stadium: Kapital Bank Arena; Attendance: 1,300; Referee: Ingilab Məmmədov

9 February 2017 17	Inter Baku	1 – 3	Neftchi Baku	Baku
17:30 AZT (UTC+4)	Aliyev 35'; F.Bayramov (yellow card) 41'	Report	Lucas 13'; Alasgarov 17'; Herrera 58'; K.Gurbanov (yellow card) 89'	Stadium: Inter Arena; Attendance: 1,200; Referee: Aliyar Ağayev

13 February 2017 18	AZAL	0 – 1	Inter Baku	Baku
15:00 AZT (UTC+4)	T.Hümbatov (yellow card) 30'; Kvirtia (yellow card) 90+1'	Report	F.Bayramov (yellow card) 66'; Hajiyev 84'	Stadium: AZAL Arena; Attendance: 500; Referee: Elvin Əsgərov

18 February 2017 19	Inter Baku	1 – 1	Zira	Baku
15:30 AZT (UTC+4)	Scarlatache (yellow card) 35'; Khizanishvili (yellow card) 42'; Aliyev 47'; S.Alkhasov (yellow card) 48'; Qirtimov (yellow card) 68'	Report	Naghiyev (yellow card) 15'; Silva 40' (o.g.); Gadze (yellow card) 72'; Nazirov (red card) 74'	Stadium: Inter Arena; Attendance: 300; Referee: Orkhan Məmmədov

28 February 2017 20	Qarabağ	0 – 1	Inter Baku	Baku
18:00 AZT (UTC+4)	Gurbanov (yellow card) 50'; Diniyev (yellow card) 90+3'	Report	F.Bayramov (yellow card) 34'; Qirtimov (yellow card) 38'; Khizanishvili 72'; Hajiyev (yellow card) 79'	Stadium: Azersun Arena; Attendance: 1,200; Referee: Elvin Əsgərov

4 March 2017 21	Inter Baku	0 – 2	Gabala	Baku
20:00 AZT (UTC+4)	Qirtimov (yellow card) 14'; Guliyev (yellow card) 51'; Fardjad-Azad (yellow card) 83'	Report	Ramaldanov (yellow card) 12'; Weeks (yellow card) 60'; T.Mutallimov 71'; Subotić 82'	Stadium: Inter Arena; Attendance: 2,500; Referee: Fariz Yusifov

13 March 2017 22	Inter Baku	1 – 0	Sumgayit	Baku
18:00 AZT (UTC+4)	Hajiyev 39'; E.Abdullayev (yellow card) 45+1'; Scarlatache (yellow card) 52'	Report	Malikov (yellow card) 56'; E.Shahverdiyev (yellow card) 74'	Stadium: Inter Arena; Attendance: 700; Referee: Aliyar Ağayev

18 March 2017 23	Neftchi Baku	2 – 1	Inter Baku	Baku
19:37 AZT (UTC+4)	Bargas 42'; Hajiyev 70'	Report	Hajiyev 71'	Stadium: Bakcell Arena; Attendance: 2,500; Referee: Fariz Yusifov

2 April 2017 24	Inter Baku	2 – 1	AZAL	Baku
17:00 AZT (UTC+4)	Fardjad-Azad (yellow card) 28'; Denis 48'; F.Bayramov (yellow card) 67'; Khizanishvili (yellow card) 74'; Aliyev 90+1'	Report	Tounkara (yellow card) 79'; Amirjanov 90+3'	Stadium: Inter Arena; Attendance: 350; Referee: Ravan Həmzəzadə

10 April 2017 25	Zira	1 – 1	Inter Baku	Zirə
15:00 AZT (UTC+4)	Gadze 19'; Mammadov (yellow card) 66'	Report	Aliyev 12'; Qirtimov (yellow card) 54'; F.Bayramov (yellow card) 90+1'	Stadium: Zira Olympic Sport Complex Stadium; Attendance: 2,000; Referee: Ramil Diniyev

16 April 2017 26	Inter Baku	0 – 3	Qarabağ	Baku
18:30 AZT (UTC+4)	Seyidov (yellow card) 43'	Report	Madatov 4'; Ndlovu 54', 78'	Stadium: Inter Arena; Attendance: 1,234; Referee: Rahim Həsənov

24 April 2017 27	Gabala	4 – 3	Inter Baku	Qabala
14:30 AZT (UTC+4)	Ricardinho 14'; Zenjov 26'; Scarlatache 33' (o.g.); Subotić (yellow card) 67'; Sadiqov (yellow card) 70'; Mutallimov 90+1'	Report	Aliyev 3', 78'; E.Abdullayev (yellow card) 72'	Stadium: Gabala City Stadium; Attendance: 1,600; Referee: Rauf Jabbarov

29 April 2017 28	Kapaz	1 – 0	Inter Baku	Ganja
16:00 AZT (UTC+4)	Dário 50'; D.Karimi (yellow card) 51'; T.Akhundov (yellow card) 53'; Ebah (yellow card) 66'; S.Aliyev (yellow card) 70'	Report	Aliyev (yellow card) 51'; E.Abdullayev (yellow card) 54'; M.Guliyev (yellow card) 90'	Stadium: Ganja City Stadium; Attendance: 11,000; Referee: Rahim Həsənov

==== League table ====
Pos	Team	Pld	W	D	L	GF	GA	GD	Pts	Qualification or relegation
1	Qarabağ (C)	28	19	5	4	46	14	+32	62	Qualification for the Champions League second qualifying round (Note: Qarabağ qualified for the Europa League second qualifying round by winning the 2016–17 Azerbaijan Cup. However, since they already qualified for European competition based on their league position, the spot awarded to the cup winners was passed down the league.)
2	Gabala	28	14	10	4	48	21	+27	52	Qualification for the Europa League second qualifying round
3	Inter Baku	28	11	10	7	39	33	+6	43	Qualification for the Europa League first qualifying round
4	Zira	28	10	9	9	29	26	+3	39	Qualification for the Europa League first qualifying round
5	Kapaz	28	9	9	10	24	27	−3	36	

Source: PFL (in Azerbaijani), UEFA, Soccerway
Rules for classification: 1) Points; 2) Head-to-head points; 3) Head-to-head goal difference; 4) Head-to-head goals scored; 5) Head-to-head away goals scored (only if two teams); 6) Goal difference; 7) Goals scored.
(C) Champions

=== Azerbaijan Cup ===
2 December 2016 Second Round	Inter Baku	5 – 1	Qaradağ Lökbatan	Baku
15:00 AZT (UTC+4)	Aliyev 13', 53'; Ramazanov (yellow card) 36' (goal) 61'; Denis (yellow card) 45'; Abışov 51' (pen.), 76'; Scarlatache (yellow card) 67'; A.Huseynov (yellow card) 74'	Report	M.Şahquliyev (yellow card) 46'; E.Məmmədov (yellow card) 51'; M.Aliyev 90+1'	Stadium: Inter Arena; Attendance: 100; Referee: Ramil Diniyev

13 December 2016 Quarterfinal First Leg	Inter Baku	2 – 0	Kapaz	Baku
17:00 AZT (UTC+4)	Qirtimov (yellow card) 21'; Guliyev (yellow card) 32'; Aliyev 58'; Hajiyev 61'; F.Bayramov (yellow card) 63'	Report	S.Rahimov (yellow card) 13'; N.Gurbanov (yellow card) 75'; Renan (yellow card) 78'	Stadium: Inter Arena; Attendance: 500; Referee: Rahim Hasanov

21 December 2016 Quarterfinal Second Leg	Kapaz	0 – 0	Inter Baku	Ganja
13:00 AZT (UTC+4)	N.Mammadov (yellow card) 24'; O.Aliyev (yellow card) 66'; Renan (yellow card) 88'	Report	F.Bayramov (yellow card) 36'; S.Zargarov (yellow card) 59'	Stadium: Ganja City Stadium; Attendance: 5,500

30 March 2017 Semifinal First Leg	Inter Baku	1 – 3	Gabala	Baku
17:00 AZT (UTC+4)	E.Abdullayev (yellow card) 13'; Scarlatache 18'; M.Guliyev (yellow card) 34'; O.Sadigli (yellow card) 87'	Report	Subotić 14' (pen.), 47'; Ozobić 88' (pen.); Santos (yellow card) 90+3'	Stadium: Inter Arena; Attendance: 500; Referee: Elvin Asgərov

5 April 2017 Semifinal Second Leg	Gabala	2 – 0 (5 – 1 agg.)	Inter Baku	Qabala
16:30 AZT (UTC+4)	Subotić 12'; Dabo 33'	Report	E.Abdullayev (yellow card) 54'	Stadium: Gabala City Stadium; Attendance: 1,800; Referee: Omar Pashayev

== Squad statistics ==
As of Match played 29 April 2017

=== Appearances and goals ===
No.	Pos	Nat	Player	Total		Premier League		Azerbaijan Cup	
No.	Pos	Nat	Player	Apps	Goals	Apps	Goals	Apps	Goals
1	GK	(Azerbaijan) AZE	Salahat Aghayev	24	0	22	0	2	0
2	DF	(Azerbaijan) AZE	Sertan Tashkin	13	0	3+8	0	0+2	0
3	DF	(Brazil) BRA	Denis Silva	28	2	21+4	2	3	0
4	DF	(Azerbaijan) AZE	Slavik Alkhasov	22	1	16+2	1	4	0
6	MF	(Azerbaijan) AZE	Samir Zargarov	24	0	5+14	0	2+3	0
7	MF	(Azerbaijan) AZE	Mirsahib Abbasov	14	0	9+4	0	1	0
8	MF	(Azerbaijan) AZE	Nizami Hajiyev	28	8	22+3	7	3	1
9	FW	(Azerbaijan) AZE	Pardis Fardjad-Azad	26	0	8+15	0	1+2	0
10	MF	(Azerbaijan) AZE	Elnur Abdullayev	26	1	20+3	1	3	0
11	FW	(Azerbaijan) AZE	Rauf Aliyev	30	14	25+1	11	4	3
13	GK	(Azerbaijan) AZE	Orkhan Sadigli	9	0	6	0	3	0
14	DF	(Georgia (country)) GEO	Zurab Khizanishvili	31	3	26	3	4+1	0
17	DF	(Azerbaijan) AZE	Abbas Huseynov	16	1	9+6	1	1	0
19	MF	(Azerbaijan) AZE	Mirhüseyn Seyidov	8	0	3+3	0	2	0
22	DF	(Azerbaijan) AZE	Ilkin Qirtimov	28	2	24	2	4	0
24	MF	(Azerbaijan) AZE	Fuad Bayramov	28	1	24	1	4	0
27	DF	(Romania) ROU	Adrian Scarlatache	24	2	16+3	1	4+1	1
33	DF	(Azerbaijan) AZE	Tarlan Guliyev	27	0	23	0	4	0
65	MF	(Azerbaijan) AZE	Jabir Amirli	3	0	1+1	0	0+1	0
66	DF	(Azerbaijan) AZE	Murad Qayalı	2	0	0+1	0	0+1	0
88	MF	(Azerbaijan) AZE	Mammad Guliyev	10	0	2+5	0	1+2	0
98	FW	(Azerbaijan) AZE	Gara Garayev	2	0	0+1	0	0+1	0
Players who left Inter Baku during the season:
15	DF	(Azerbaijan) AZE	Ruslan Abışov	16	7	11+2	5	2+1	2
55	FW	(Azerbaijan) AZE	Aghabala Ramazanov	16	5	13	4	3	1

=== Goal scorers ===
Place	Position	Nation	Number	Name	Premier League	Azerbaijan Cup	Total
1	FW	(Azerbaijan)	11	Rauf Aliyev	11	3	14
2	MF	(Azerbaijan)	8	Nizami Hajiyev	7	1	8
3	DF	(Azerbaijan)	15	Ruslan Abışov	5	2	7
4	FW	(Azerbaijan)	55	Aghabala Ramazanov	4	1	5
5	DF	(Georgia (country))	14	Zurab Khizanishvili	3	0	3
6	DF	(Azerbaijan)	22	Ilkin Qirtimov	2	0	2
6	DF	(Brazil)	3	Denis Silva	2	0	2
6	DF	(Romania)	27	Adrian Scarlatache	1	1	2
9	DF	(Azerbaijan)	4	Slavik Alkhasov	1	0	1
9	DF	(Azerbaijan)	17	Abbas Huseynov	1	0	1
9	MF	(Azerbaijan)	24	Fuad Bayramov	1	0	1
9	MF	(Azerbaijan)	10	Elnur Abdullayev	1	0	1
				TOTALS	39	8	47

=== Disciplinary record ===
Number	Nation	Position	Name	Premier League		Azerbaijan Cup		Total	
Number	Nation	Position	Name	Yellow card	Red card	Yellow card	Red card	Yellow card	Red card
1	(Azerbaijan)	GK	Salahat Aghayev	4	0	0	0	4	0
3	(Brazil)	DF	Denis Silva	2	0	1	0	3	0
4	(Azerbaijan)	DF	Slavik Alkhasov	3	0	0	0	3	0
6	(Azerbaijan)	MF	Samir Zargarov	2	0	1	0	3	0
8	(Azerbaijan)	MF	Nizami Hajiyev	5	0	0	0	5	0
9	(Azerbaijan)	FW	Pardis Fardjad-Azad	6	0	0	0	6	0
10	(Azerbaijan)	MF	Elnur Abdullayev	6	0	2	0	8	0
11	(Azerbaijan)	FW	Rauf Aliyev	4	0	0	0	4	0
13	(Azerbaijan)	GK	Orkhan Sadigli	1	0	1	0	2	0
14	(Georgia (country))	DF	Zurab Khizanishvili	7	0	0	0	7	0
15	(Azerbaijan)	DF	Ruslan Abışov	3	0	0	0	3	0
17	(Azerbaijan)	DF	Abbas Huseynov	0	0	1	0	1	0
19	(Azerbaijan)	MF	Mirhüseyn Seyidov	1	0	0	0	1	0
22	(Azerbaijan)	DF	Ilkin Qirtimov	8	0	1	0	9	0
24	(Azerbaijan)	MF	Fuad Bayramov	10	0	2	0	12	0
27	(Romania)	DF	Adrian Scarlatache	4	1	1	0	5	1
33	(Azerbaijan)	DF	Tarlan Guliyev	7	0	1	0	8	0
55	(Azerbaijan)	FW	Aghabala Ramazanov	3	0	1	0	4	0
88	(Azerbaijan)	MF	Mammad Guliyev	1	0	1	0	2	0
			TOTALS	76	1	13	0	89	1
