= 2016–17 Azerbaijan Cup =

Tournament details
- Country: Azerbaijan
- Teams: 18

Tournament statistics
- Matches played: 23
- Goals scored: 72 (3.13 per match)
- Top goal scorer(s): Namik Alaskarov; Dino Ndlovu (4 goals)

The 2016–17 Azerbaijan Cup is the 25th season of the annual cup competition in Azerbaijan. The final is set to be played on 5 May 2017.

== First round ==
The First Round games were drawn on 6 October 2016.

12 October 2016 Match 1	Turan-Tovuz (2)	4 – 0	Bakılı (2)	Tovuz
15:00 AZST (UTC+5)	R.Musayev 30', 67'; S.Gojayev (yellow card) 31'; T.Əliyev 61' (o.g.); T.Alhuseynli 69'	Summary	S.Markelov (yellow card) 34'	Stadium: Tovuz City Stadium; Attendance: 3,000; Referee: Orkhan Məmmədov

12 October 2016 Match 2	Shamkir (2)	1 – 2	Qaradağ Lökbatan (2)	Şəmkir
15:00 AZST (UTC+5)	S.Baleljae 45'	Summary	R.Mammadov 43'; B.Soltanov 90'	Stadium: Shamkir Olympic Sport Complex Stadium; Attendance: 1,500; Referee: Ingilab Məmmədov

== Second round ==
The two winners of the First Round will progress to the Second Round, which was also drawn on 6 October 2016.

3 December 2016 Match 3	Turan-Tovuz (2)	0 – 1	Zira (1)	Tovuz
13:00 AZT (UTC+4)	A.Dashzarini (yellow card) 61'; A.Mukhtaroglu (yellow card) 82'; V.Asaliyev (yellow card) 83'	Summary	N.Novruzov (yellow card) 61'; A.Shemonayev 80'	Stadium: Tovuz City Stadium; Attendance: 1,500; Referee: Ingilab Məmmədov

2 December 2016 Match 4	Neftchi Baku (1)	2 – 0	Sharurspor (2)	Baku
17:00 AZT (UTC+4)	F.Muradbayli 14'; M.Isayev 22'; E.Yagublu (yellow card) 64'	Summary	A.Ağayev (yellow card) 44'; J.Süleymanov (yellow card) 74'	Stadium: Bakcell Arena; Attendance: 300; Referee: Orkhan Məmmədov

3 December 2016 Match 5	Qarabağ (1)	5 – 0	Səbail (2)	Baku
17:00 AZT (UTC+4)	Ndlovu 21', 53'; Quintana 33'; Míchel 55'; Diniyev 81'	Summary		Stadium: Azersun Arena; Attendance: 700; Referee: Omar Paşayev

2 December 2016 Match 6	MOIK Baku (2)	0 – 2	Sumgayit (1)	Baku
14:00 AZT (UTC+4)	J.Muxtarzadə (yellow card) 45'; G.İbrahimov (yellow card) 66'	Summary	A.Mehdiyev (yellow card) 44'; Kurbanov 76'; Hüseynov (yellow card) 78'; Yunanov 83'	Stadium: Bayil Stadium; Attendance: 150; Referee: Aliyar Ağayev

2 December 2016 Match 7	Inter Baku (1)	5 – 1	Qaradağ Lökbatan (2)	Baku
15:00 AZT (UTC+4)	Aliyev 13', 53'; Ramazanov (yellow card) 36' (goal) 61'; Denis (yellow card) 45'; Abışov 51' (pen.), 76'; Scarlatache (yellow card) 67'; A.Huseynov (yellow card) 74'	Summary	M.Şahquliyev (yellow card) 46'; E.Məmmədov (yellow card) 51'; M.Aliyev 90+1'	Stadium: Inter Arena; Attendance: 100; Referee: Ramil Diniyev

3 December 2016 Match 8	Shahdag Qusar (2)	1 – 5	Kapaz (1)	Baku
13:00 AZT (UTC+4)	A.Alimammadov (yellow card) 2'; E.Yahyabayov (yellow card) 13'; F.Aghalarov (yellow card) 54'; H.Hasanov 78'	Summary	O.Aliyev 10'; S.Rahimov 12'; T.Gurbatov 31'; T.Rzayev 51' (yellow card) 54'; J.Javadov 87'	Stadium: Bayil Stadium; Attendance: 150; Referee: Ravan Həmzəzadə

3 December 2016 Match 9	Gabala (1)	2 – 2 (a.e.t.) (4–1 p)	Zagatala (2)	Qabala
15:00 AZT (UTC+4)	Stanković 12'; Eyyubov 45+2' (pen.); Kvekveskiri (yellow card) 60'; E.Jamalov (yellow card) 70'; Huseynov (yellow card) 71'; Santos (yellow card) 114'; Qurbanov (yellow card) 120'	Summary	S.Abdullayev 32'; O.Balash 65' (yellow card) 109'; A.Agajanov (yellow card) 111'	Stadium: Gabala City Stadium; Attendance: 1,000; Referee: Rauf Cabbarov
	Penalties
	Ozobić (penalty scored); Stanković (penalty scored); Eyyubov (penalty scored); Qurbanov (penalty scored)		O.Balash (penalty scored); V.Abdullayev (penalty missed); R.Tagizade (penalty missed)

2 December 2016 Match 10	AZAL (1)	4 – 0	Ravan Baku (2)	Baku
16:00 AZT (UTC+4)	S.Mammadov 12'; A.Najafov (yellow card) 60'; Mirzaga Huseynpur 62'; Abdullayev (yellow card) 72'; D.Janelidze 80', 85'	Summary	M.Haşımlı (yellow card) 82'; Z.Quliyev (red card) 90+1'	Stadium: AZAL Arena; Attendance: 100; Referee: Fariz Yusifov

== Quarterfinals ==
The eight winners from the Second Round are drawn into four two-legged ties.

13 December 2016 Match 11 1st leg	Zira (1)	0 – 3	Neftchi Baku (1)	Zirə
17:00 AZT (UTC+4)		Summary	Pessalli 44', 58', 63'	Stadium: Zira Olympic Sport Complex Stadium; Attendance: 400; Referee: Aliyar Ağayev

21 December 2016 Match 11 2nd leg	Neftchi Baku (1)	1 – 2 (4 – 2 agg.)	Zira (1)	Baku
17:00 AZT (UTC+4)	R.Mammadov 40'; E.Yagublu (yellow card) 59'; Jairo (yellow card) 61'	Summary	Đurić 34' (yellow card) 59'; Krneta (yellow card) 35'; Naghiyev (yellow card) 39'; Meza (yellow card) 57'; N.Novruzov 85'	Stadium: Bakcell Arena; Attendance: 200; Referee: Ramil Diniyev

13 December 2016 Match 12 1st leg	Qarabağ	6 – 0	Sumgayit (1)	Baku
18:00 AZT (UTC+4)	Richard 25' (pen.); Ndlovu 34' (pen.); Diniyev 40'; Madatov 64', 78'; Alasgarov 67'	Summary	Hüseynov (yellow card) 34'; B.Hasanalizade (yellow card) 54'; K.Najafov (yellow card) 68'	Stadium: Azersun Arena; Attendance: 500; Referee: Orkhan Mammadov

21 December 2016 Match 12 2nd leg	Sumgayit (1)	2 – 5 (2 – 11 agg.)	Qarabağ	Sumqayit
15:00 AZT (UTC+4)	Yunanov 14', 80'; B.Hasanalizade (yellow card) 66'; N.Abilayev (yellow card) 72'	Summary	Alasgarov 8', 16', 82'; Nadirov 70'; Amirguliyev 90'	Stadium: Kapital Bank Arena; Attendance: 950; Referee: Rauf Jabbarov

13 December 2016 Match 13 1st leg	Inter Baku (1)	2 – 0	Kapaz (1)	Baku
17:00 AZT (UTC+4)	Qirtimov (yellow card) 21'; Guliyev (yellow card) 32'; Aliyev 58'; Hajiyev 61'; F.Bayramov (yellow card) 63'	Summary	S.Rahimov (yellow card) 13'; N.Gurbanov (yellow card) 75'; Renan (yellow card) 78'	Stadium: Inter Arena; Attendance: 500; Referee: Rahim Hasanov

21 December 2016 Match 13 2nd leg	Kapaz (1)	0 – 0 (0 – 2 agg.)	Inter Baku (1)	Ganja
13:00 AZT (UTC+4)	N.Mammadov (yellow card) 24'; O.Aliyev (yellow card) 66'; Renan (yellow card) 88'	Summary	F.Bayramov (yellow card) 36'; S.Zargarov (yellow card) 59'	Stadium: Ganja City Stadium; Attendance: 5,500; Referee: Rahim Həsənov

13 December 2016 Match 14 1st leg	Gabala (1)	2 – 1	AZAL (1)	Qabala
15:00 AZT (UTC+4)	Ozobić 61'; Qurbanov 74' (yellow card) 90+1'	Summary	Mirzaga Huseynpur 37'; Amirjanov (yellow card) 76'	Stadium: Gabala City Stadium; Attendance: 500; Referee: Fariz Yusifov

21 December 2016 Match 14 2nd leg	AZAL (1)	0 – 1 (1 – 2 agg.)	Gabala (1)	Baku
16:00 AZT (UTC+4)	D.Janelidze (yellow card) 32'; K.Hüseynov (yellow card) 51'; K.Mirzayev (yellow card) 68'; E.Huseynov (yellow card) 87'	Summary	Stanković (yellow card) 24'; A.Mammadov 53'	Stadium: AZAL Arena; Attendance: 250; Referee: Fariz Yusifov

== Semi-finals ==
The four winners from the Quarterfinals were drawn into two two-legged ties.

30 March 2017 Match 15 1st leg	Neftchi Baku (1)	0 – 2	Qarabağ (1)	Baku
20:30 AZST (UTC+5)	Petrov (yellow card) 48'	Summary	Muarem 13'; Ndlovu 28'; E.Abdullayev (yellow card) 72'; S.Mahammadaliyev (yellow card) 89'	Stadium: Bakcell Arena; Attendance: 3,800; Referee: Aliyar Ağayev

5 April 2017 Match 15 2nd leg	Qarabağ (1)	0 – 0 (2 – 0 agg.)	Neftchi Baku (1)	Baku
20:30 AZST (UTC+5)		Summary	Petrov (yellow card) 19'	Stadium: Tofiq Bahramov Republican Stadium; Attendance: 3,500; Referee: Aliyar Ağayev

30 March 2017 Match 16 1st leg	Inter Baku (1)	1 – 3	Gabala (1)	Baku
18:00 AZST (UTC+5)	E.Abdullayev (yellow card) 13'; Scarlatache 18'; M.Guliyev (yellow card) 34'; O.Sadigli (yellow card) 87'	Summary	Subotić 14' (pen.), 47'; Ozobić 88' (pen.); Santos (yellow card) 90+3'	Stadium: Inter Arena; Attendance: 500; Referee: Elvin Asgərov

5 April 2017 Match 16 2nd leg	Gabala (1)	2 – 0 (5 – 1 agg.)	Inter Baku (1)	Qabala
17:30 AZST (UTC+5)	Subotić 12'; Dabo 33'	Summary	E.Abdullayev (yellow card) 54'	Stadium: Gabala City Stadium; Attendance: 1,800; Referee: Omar Pashayev

== Final ==
5 May 2017
17:00 AZST (UTC+5)

Qarabağ (1)	2–0	(1) Gabala
Madatov (yellow card) 28' (goal) 52'; Abbasov 68' (o.g.)	Summary	Stanković (yellow card) 79'

Nakhchivan City Stadium, Nakhchivan
Attendance: 12,800
Referee: Fariz Yusifov

Qarabağ	Gabala

GK	13	(Bosnia and Herzegovina) Ibrahim Šehić
DF	5	(Azerbaijan) Maksim Medvedev
DF	14	(Azerbaijan) Rashad Sadygov		(substituted off) 54'
DF	25	(Albania) Ansi Agolli
DF	55	(Azerbaijan) Badavi Guseynov
MF	2	(Azerbaijan) Gara Garayev
MF	8	(Spain) Míchel
MF	10	(North Macedonia) Muarem Muarem
MF	20	(Brazil) Richard Almeida		(substituted off) 85'
MF	22	(Azerbaijan) Afran Ismayilov
FW	11	(Azerbaijan) Mahir Madatov	(yellow card) 28'	(substituted off) 74'
Substitutes:
GK	12	(Azerbaijan) Shahruddin Mahammadaliyev
MF	18	(Azerbaijan) Ilgar Gurbanov
MF	21	(Azerbaijan) Arif Dashdemirov
MF	22	(Azerbaijan) Rahid Amirguliyev		(substituted on) 85'
MF	44	(Azerbaijan) Aghabala Ramazanov		(substituted on) 74'
MF	77	(Azerbaijan) Elshan Abdullayev
MF	91	(Azerbaijan) Joshgun Diniyev		(substituted on) 54'
Manager:
(Azerbaijan) Gurban Gurbanov

GK	'22	(Ukraine) Dmytro Bezotosnyi
DF	3	(Serbia) Vojislav Stanković	(yellow card) 79'
DF	34	(Azerbaijan) Urfan Abbasov
MF	6	(Azerbaijan) Rashad Sadiqov
MF	14	(Azerbaijan) Javid Huseynov
MF	27	(Liberia) Theo Weeks		(substituted off) 27'
MF	77	(Azerbaijan) Araz Abdullayev		(substituted off) 73'
MF	7	(Georgia (country)) Nika Kvekveskiri
MF	19	(Croatia) Filip Ozobić
MF	88	(Azerbaijan) Tellur Mutallimov		(substituted off) 26'
FW	9	(Estonia) Sergei Zenjov
Substitutes:
GK	33	(Poland) Dawid Pietrzkiewicz
FW	10	(Azerbaijan) Ruslan Qurbanov
MF	11	(Azerbaijan) Asif Mammadov
DF	17	(Azerbaijan) Magomed Mirzabekov		(substituted on) 27'
FW	18	(France) Bagaliy Dabo		(substituted on) 73'
MF	21	(Azerbaijan) Roman Huseynov		(substituted on) 26'
DF	44	(Brazil) Rafael Santos
Manager:
(Ukraine) Roman Hryhorchuk

== Scorers ==
4 goals:

- (Azerbaijan) Namig Alasgarov - Qarabağ
- (South Africa) Dino Ndlovu - Qarabağ

3 goals:

- (Switzerland) Danijel Subotić - Gabala
- (Azerbaijan) Rauf Aliyev - Inter Baku
- (Brazil) Pessalli - Neftchi Baku
- (Azerbaijan) Mahir Madatov - Qarabağ
- (Azerbaijan) Amil Yunanov - Sumgayit

2 goals:

- (Azerbaijan) Mirzaga Huseynpur - AZAL
- (Georgia (country)) David Janelidze - AZAL
- (Croatia) Filip Ozobić - Gabala
- (Azerbaijan) Ruslan Abışov - Inter Baku
- (Azerbaijan) Joshgun Diniyev - Qarabağ
- (Azerbaijan) Rahman Musayev - Turan Tovuz

1 goals:

- (Azerbaijan) Shirmammad Mammadov - AZAL
- (Azerbaijan) Rashad Eyyubov - Gabala
- (Azerbaijan) Asif Mammadov - Gabala
- (Azerbaijan) Ruslan Qurbanov - Gabala
- (France) Bagaliy Dabo - Gabala
- (Serbia) Vojislav Stanković - Gabala
- (Azerbaijan) Aghabala Ramazanov - Inter Baku
- (Azerbaijan) Nizami Hajiyev - Inter Baku
- (Romania) Adrian Scarlatache - Inter Baku
- (Azerbaijan) Orkhan Aliyev - Kapaz
- (Azerbaijan) Shahriyar Rahimov - Kapaz
- (Azerbaijan) Tural Gurbatov - Kapaz
- (Azerbaijan) Tural Rzayev - Kapaz
- (Azerbaijan) Jeyhun Javadov - Kapaz
- (Azerbaijan) Fahmin Muradbayli - Neftchi Baku
- (Azerbaijan) Magsad Isayev - Neftchi Baku
- (Azerbaijan) Rahil Mammadov - Neftchi Baku
- (Azerbaijan) Rahid Amirguliyev - Qarabağ
- (Azerbaijan) Vüqar Nadirov - Qarabağ
- (Brazil) Richard - Qarabağ
- (Spain) Míchel - Qarabağ
- (Spain) Dani Quintana - Qarabağ
- (North Macedonia) Muarem Muarem - Qarabağ
- (Azerbaijan) Mahammad Aliyev - Qaradağ Lökbatan
- (Azerbaijan) Rufet Mammadov - Qaradağ Lökbatan
- (Azerbaijan) Bakhtiyar Soltanov - Qaradağ Lökbatan
- (Azerbaijan) Hagverdi Hasanov - Shahdag Qusar
- (Azerbaijan) S.Baleljae - Shamkir
- (Azerbaijan) Magomed Kurbanov - Sumgayit
- (Azerbaijan) Tugay Alhüseynli - Turan Tovuz
- (Azerbaijan) S.Abdullayev - Zagatala
- (Azerbaijan) Oruc Balaşlı - Zagatala
- (Azerbaijan) Aleksandr Shemonayev - Zira
- (Azerbaijan) Nurlan Novruzov - Zira
- (Serbia) Milan Đurić - Zira

Own goals:

- (Azerbaijan) Tapdıq Əliyev (12 October 2016 vs Turan Tovuz)
- (Azerbaijan) Urfan Abbasov (5 May 2017 vs Qarabağ)
