= Eltun Yagublu =

Azerbaijani footballer (born 1991)

Personal information
- Full name: Eltun Shofik oglu Yagublu
- Date of birth: 19 August 1991 (age 35)
- Place of birth: Baku, Azerbaijan
- Height: 1.76 m (5 ft 9 in)
- Position: Right-back

Team information
- Current team: Zira (assistant manager)

Youth career
- Neftçi Baku

Senior career*
Years	Team	Apps	(Gls)
2013–2016	Qarabağ	6	(0)
2014–2015	→ Shuvalan (loan)	14	(1)
2016–2017	Neftçi Baku	4	(0)
2017–2020	Sabail	33	(1)

Managerial career
- 2020–: Zira (assistant manager)
- * Club domestic league appearances and goals as of 23 September 2020

Eltun Yagublu (Azerbaijani: Eltun Yaqublu; born 19 August 1991) is an Azerbaijani footballer who last played as a defender for Sabail in the Azerbaijan Premier League.

== Club career ==
On 20 February 2012, Yagublu made his debut in the Azerbaijan Premier League for Qarabağ match against Kapaz.

== Honours ==
Qarabağ

- Azerbaijan Premier League (2): 2013–14, 2015–16
- Azerbaijan Cup (1): 2015–16
