= Krševan Santini =

Croatian footballer

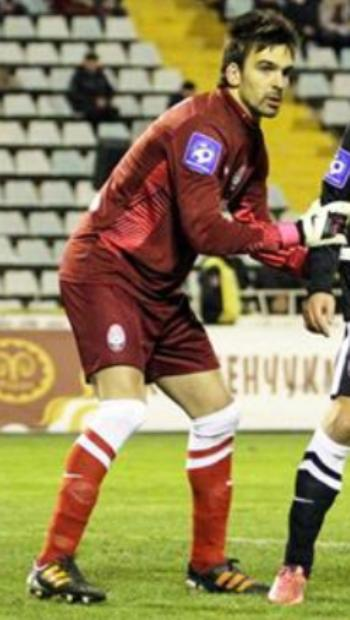
- Santini playing with Zorya Luhansk in 2013

Personal information
- Date of birth: 11 April 1987 (age 39)
- Place of birth: Zadar, SFR Yugoslavia
- Height: 1.89 m (6 ft 2 in)
- Position: Goalkeeper

Youth career
- –2004: Zadar

Senior career*
Years	Team	Apps	(Gls)
2004–2005	Zadar	1	(0)
2006	Velebit Benkovac	0	(0)
2007	Segesta	0	(0)
2007–2009	Moslavina	36	(0)
2009	Velebit Benkovac	7	(0)
2010	Hrvatski Dragovoljac	7	(0)
2010–2012	Inter Zaprešić	76	(0)
2013–2015	Zorya Luhansk	32	(0)
2016	EN Paralimni	8	(0)
2016	Neftchi Baku	8	(0)
2017–2018	Inter Zaprešić	19	(0)
2018–2019	Osijek	5	(0)
2019	→ Domžale (loan)	16	(0)
2019–2020	Jagiellonia	0	(0)
2021–2023	Lokomotiva Zagreb	31	(0)
- * Club domestic league appearances and goals

Krševan Santini (born 11 April 1987) is a Croatian former professional footballer who played as a goalkeeper.

== Career ==
Krševan Santini, born in Zadar, followed in the footsteps of his younger brother Ivan, who would also become a professional football player, and joined the Zadar youth team after watching his brother play. He debuted aged 17, coming in the 4–1 loss against Inter Zaprešić on 20.11.2004, for Thomas Amugi, after Danijel Subašić was sent off and conceding three goals in the last 15 minutes of the game. He didn't appear again for the club, and as Antonijo Ježina was chosen as Subašić's replacement, he decided to move elsewhere in late 2005. After trying to find a club in Italy and not succeeding, he joined the third-tier Velebit Benkovac for the remainder of the season. He moved on to the Druga HNL. He spent the following four seasons alternating between Druga HNL and Treća HNL, playing for Segesta, Moslavina, Velebit Benkovac again and Hrvatski Dragovoljac.

In the summer of 2010 he found his first professional engagement, signing a contract with the very club he made his Prva HNL debut against in 2004, Inter Zaprešić, as a replacement for Matej Delač. He went on to become a first team fixture, playing 76 league games for the club in the following two and a half years.

Santini made his first move abroad in February 2013, more precisely, Ukraine, signing a contract with Zorya Luhansk, which was extended to two years in May 2013 after his good performances for the team.

On 23 June 2016, Santin signed with Neftchi Baku, before having his contract terminated by mutual consent on 16 December 2016.

In June 2017, Santini returned to Inter Zaprešić.

== International career ==
Santini was on the list for the Croatia U21 friendlies against the Faroe Islands in 2007, while playing in the Druga HNL for Moslavina.

== Personal life ==
His brother is striker Ivan Santini, who has been capped for Croatia senior team. Their father is the late singer Romeo Santini.
