= Justin Grioli =

Maltese footballer

Personal information
- Date of birth: 20 September 1987 (age 39)
- Position: Right back

Team information
- Current team: Gudja United
- Number: 27

Senior career*
Years	Team	Apps	(Gls)
2005–2010	Valletta	77	(4)
2010–2013	Tarxien Rainbows	90	(0)
2013–2019	Balzan	140	(2)
2019–	Gudja United	9	(0)

International career^{‡}
2014–	Malta	2	(0)
- * Club domestic league appearances and goals as of 00:29, 7 November 2019 (UTC) ‡ National team caps and goals as of 15:20, 25 January 2018 (UTC)

Justin Grioli (born 20 September 1987) is a Maltese international footballer who plays for Gudja United, as a right back.

== Career ==
Grioli has played club football for Valletta, Tarxien Rainbows and Balzan.

He made his international debut for Malta in 2014.
