= Elkin Serrano =

Colombian footballer (born 1984)

Personal information
- Full name: Elkin Orlando Serrano Valero
- Date of birth: March 17, 1984 (age 42)
- Place of birth: Bogotá, Colombia
- Position: Centre back

Team information
- Current team: Victoria Hotspurs
- Number: 23

Senior career*
Years	Team	Apps	(Gls)
2006–2007	Academia		
2008–2010	La Equidad	39	(1)
2011	Itagüí Ditaires	19	(2)
2012	Cúcuta Deportivo	12	(0)
2012	Atlético Bucaramanga	14	(0)
2013	Alianza Petrolera	5	(0)
2014–2019	Balzan	123	(9)
2019–2020	Nadur Youngsters	15	
- * Club domestic league appearances and goals ‡ National team caps and goals as of 21:51, 5 February 2020 (UTC)

Elkin Orlando Serrano Valero (Bogotá, Colombia, March 17, 1984) is a Colombian footballer who plays as a centre back for Victoria Hotspurs in Malta.

== Career ==
=== Nadur Youngsters ===
Ahead of the 2019–20 season, Serrando joined Nadur Youngsters in Malta.
