= Taşkın İlter =

Azerbaijani footballer (born 1994)

Personal information
- Date of birth: 5 July 1994 (age 32)
- Place of birth: Berlin, Germany
- Height: 1.85 m (6 ft 1 in)
- Position: Midfielder

Team information
- Current team: Eyüpspor
- Number: 28

Youth career
- Tasmania Gropiusstadt
- Hertha BSC
- –2012: Hertha Zehlendorf
- 2012: Türkiyemspor Berlin
- 2013: Eintracht Braunschweig

Senior career*
Years	Team	Apps	(Gls)
2013–2015	Eintracht Braunschweig II	30	(1)
2015–2016	TSG Neustrelitz	23	(1)
2016–2018	Denizlispor	30	(0)
2018–2019	Afyonspor	21	(1)
2019	Sakaryaspor	12	(0)
2020–	Eyüpspor	140	(6)

International career^{‡}
2012	Azerbaijan U19	3	(0)
2013–2015	Azerbaijan U21	16	(0)
2013	Azerbaijan	1	(0)
- * Club domestic league appearances and goals as of 10 June 2026 ‡ National team caps and goals as of 27 October 2016

Taşkın İlter (born on 5 July 1994) is a professional footballer who plays as a midfielder for Turkish club Eyüpspor. Born in Berlin, Germany, he plays for the Azerbaijan national team.

== Club career ==
After playing for various youth teams in his hometown of Berlin, İlter joined the U19 side of Eintracht Braunschweig during the winter break of the 2012–13 season. For the 2013–14 season he was promoted to the club's reserve side in the Regionalliga Nord. In 2015, he transferred to TSG Neustrelitz in the Regionalliga Nordost.

In July 2016, İlter joined Denizlispor.

== International career ==
Despite not having played a professional game in his career, İlter was called up to the Azerbaijani senior national team by Berti Vogts in November 2013. There he made his full international debut on 19 November 2013 in a friendly against Kyrgyzstan. After a break of eleven months, he was called up again in October 2014 for Azerbaijan's UEFA Euro 2016 qualifying games against Italy and Croatia.
