= NK Velebit =

Croatian football club

Velebit Benkovac
- Full name: Hrvatski nogometni klub Velebit Benkovac
- Founded: 1925
- Ground: Town stadium Benkovac
- Capacity: 3,000
- Chairman: Boris Erceg
- Manager: Šime Kardum
- League: 1. ŽNL – Zadar
- 2023–24: 1. ŽNL – Zadar, 7th
| Home colours | Away colours |

HNK Velebit Benkovac is a Croatian football club based in the town of Benkovac.
