= Dani Segovia =

Spanish footballer

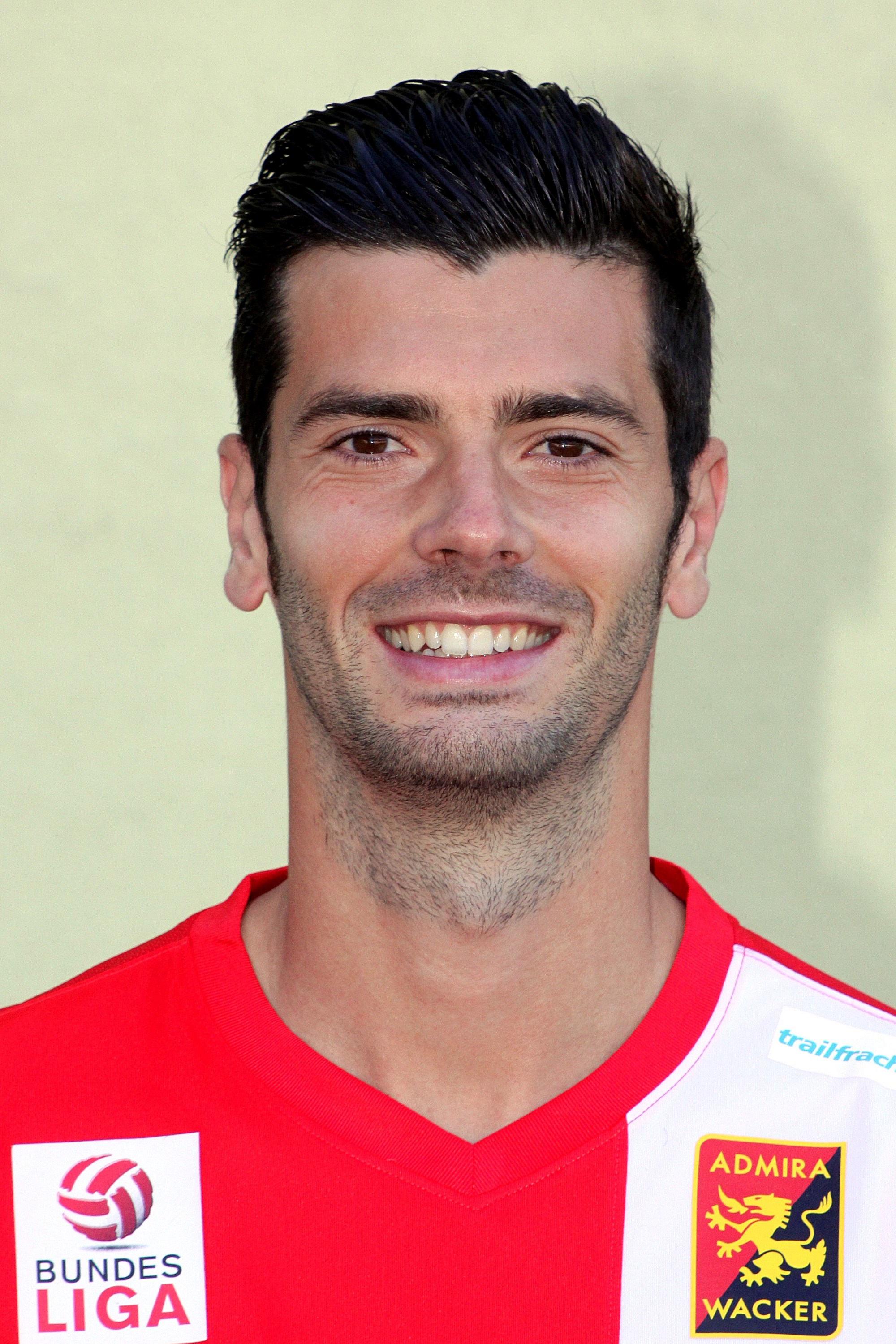
- Segovia being presented at Admira Wacker

Personal information
- Full name: Daniel Lucas Segovia
- Date of birth: 23 May 1985 (age 41)
- Place of birth: Madrid, Spain
- Height: 1.90 m (6 ft 3 in)
- Position: Striker

Team information
- Current team: Moscardó

Youth career
- Dosa
- Rayo Vallecano

Senior career*
Years	Team	Apps	(Gls)
2004–2006	Rayo Vallecano B		
2004–2005	Rayo Vallecano	7	(2)
2006–2007	Fuenlabrada	22	(3)
2007	Algeciras	12	(2)
2008	Zaragoza B		
2008–2009	Atlético Pinto		
2009–2010	Conquense	32	(8)
2010–2011	Atlético Baleares	30	(4)
2011–2013	St. Pölten	48	(29)
2013	Admira Wacker	15	(3)
2013–2014	Wolfsberger AC	18	(0)
2014–2017	St. Pölten	82	(33)
2017–2018	Neftchi	19	(5)
2018	Bengaluru	5	(0)
2018–2019	Racing Santander	23	(7)
2019–2020	Badajoz	11	(1)
2020	UCAM Murcia	5	(0)
2020–2021	Ejea	20	(5)
2021–2022	Montijo	30	(9)
2022–2023	Unión Adarve	30	(10)
2023–2024	Gimnástica Segoviana	29	(6)
2024–	Moscardó	49	(15)
- * Club domestic league appearances and goals as of 02:28, 25 January 2026 (UTC)

Daniel "Dani" Lucas Segovia (born 23 May 1985) is a Spanish professional footballer who plays as a striker for Segunda Federación club Moscardó.

== Club career ==
Born in Madrid, Segovia finished his development with local Rayo Vallecano, first appearing with the main squad during the 2004–05 season in Segunda División B. Released in June 2006, he went on to resume his career at that level but also in the Tercera División, representing CF Fuenlabrada, Algeciras CF, Deportivo Aragón, CA Pinto, UB Conquense and CD Atlético Baleares.

Segovia moved abroad for the first time in his career in the summer of 2010, joining Austrian Football First League club SKN St. Pölten. On 12 July 2011, he played his first match as a professional, coming on as a second-half substitute in a 0–2 home loss against WAC St. Andrä. He finished his first season abroad with 17 goals, ranking third in the league's scoring charts.

After one and a half years, Segovia changed teams but stayed in Austria, signing for Bundesliga's FC Admira Wacker Mödling. He made his debut in the competition on 16 February 2013, in a 1–2 home defeat to SC Wiener Neustadt where he featured 36 minutes from the bench. On 13 April, now as a starter, he scored his first goals for his new team, netting twice in the 4–3 win against FC Wacker Innsbruck.

On 26 May 2013, Segovia scored the game's only goal at SV Mattersburg in the last matchday, helping Admira leapfrog their opponent to finish in ninth position and thus barely avoid relegation. In the off-season, he transferred to Wolfsberger AC of the same league.

On 2 February 2017, Segovia left St. Pölten and signed a six-month deal with Neftçi PFK from the Azerbaijan Premier League. His contract was terminated by mutual consent on 29 January 2018.

Segovia joined Indian Super League side Bengaluru FC on 15 February 2018, as a replacement for injured compatriot Braulio Nóbrega. He returned to his homeland on 9 August, agreeing to a one-year contract at Racing de Santander.

== Career statistics ==
As of match played on 30 September 2018

Club	Season	League			Cup		Other		Total	
Club	Season	Division	Apps	Goals	Apps	Goals	Apps	Goals	Apps	Goals
Rayo Vallecano	2004–05	Segunda División B	7	2	1	0	—		8	2
Fuenlabrada	2006–07	Segunda División B	22	3	1	0	—		23	3
Algeciras	2007–08	Segunda División B	12	2	1	0	—		13	1
Conquense	2009–10	Segunda División B	32	8	2	0	—		34	8
Atlético Baleares	2010–11	Segunda División B	30	4	1	0	—		31	4
St. Pölten	2011–12	Erste Liga	35	17	1	0	—		36	17
St. Pölten	2012–13	Erste Liga	13	12	1	0	—		14	12
St. Pölten	Total		48	29	2	0	—		50	29
Admira	2012–13	Austrian Bundesliga	15	3	0	0	—		15	0
Wolfsberger AC	2013–14	Austrian Bundesliga	13	12	1	0	—		14	12
St. Pölten	2014–15	Erste Liga	31	10	3	2	4 (Note: Appearances in UEFA Europa League)	4	38	16
St. Pölten	2015–16	Erste Liga	34	19	5	2	—		39	21
St. Pölten	2016–17	Austrian Bundesliga	17	4	2	1	—		19	5
St. Pölten	Total		82	33	10	5	4	4	96	42
Neftchi	2016–17	Azerbaijan Premier League	13	5	2	0	—		15	5
Neftchi	2017–18	Azerbaijan Premier League	6	0	1	3	—		7	3
Neftchi	Total		19	5	3	3	—		22	8
Bengaluru	2017–18	Indian Super League	5	0	0	0	5 (Note: Appearances in AFC Cup)	4	10	4
Racing Santander	2018–19	Segunda División B	5	3	1	1	—		6	4
Career total			296	92	23	10	9	8	328	110
