= Aghabala Ramazanov =

Azerbaijani footballer (born 1993)

Personal information
- Full name: Aghabala Ramazanov
- Date of birth: 20 January 1993 (age 33)
- Place of birth: Azerbaijan
- Height: 1.69 m (5 ft 6 1/2 in)
- Position: Forward

Youth career
- –2011: Neftchi U-19

Senior career*
Years	Team	Apps	(Gls)
2011–2012	Neftchi Baku	1	(0)
2012–2015	Khazar Lankaran	54	(4)
2015–2016	Sumgayit	33	(5)
2016–2017	Inter Baku	13	(4)
2017–2018	Qarabağ	18	(0)
2018–2019	Sabail	33	(10)
2020–2022	Zira	47	(12)
2022–2024	Sabail	37	(6)

International career^{‡}
2013–2014	Azerbaijan U21	8	(2)
2017	Azerbaijan U23	5	(1)
2014–2019	Azerbaijan	18	(1)
Medal record
Men's football
Representing Azerbaijan
Islamic Solidarity Games
Winner	2017 Azerbaijan
- * Club domestic league appearances and goals as of 14 September 2024 ‡ National team caps and goals as of 20 November 2019

Aghabala Ramazanov (born 20 January 1993) is an Azerbaijani football coach and former professional footballer. He is the brother of Zaur Ramazanov.

== Career ==
=== Club ===
Ağabala Ramazanov started football with the Neftchi PFK's U-19 team.

Ramazanov began his senior career in 2011 with Neftchi PFK. In 2012, he was transferred to Khazar Lankaran.

In June 2015, Ramazanov moved from Khazar Lankaran FK to Sumgayit FK. He played for Inter Baku in 2016 and was transferred to Qarabağ FK in January 2017.

On 24 May 2018, Qarabağ FK announced that Ramazanov had been released by the club following expiration of his contract. On 26 May 2018, Sabail FK announced the signing of Ramazanov.

On 4 June 2021, Ramazanov signed 1.5 years contract with Zira FK. Ramazanov left Zira at the end of May 2022.

Ramazanov played for Sabail FK until the end of his career in June 2024. On 4 September 2024 Zira FK announced that Ramazanov would be working as a coach at the club. On March 6, 2025, the club announced that it had signed a contract with Ramazanov and that he would join the first team's coaching staff.

== Personal life ==
Aghabala is the younger brother of retired Azerbaijan international footballer Zaur.

== Career statistics ==
=== Club ===
As of 14 September 2024

Appearances and goals by club, season and competition
Club	Season	League			National Cup		Continental		Other		Total	
Club	Season	Division	Apps	Goals	Apps	Goals	Apps	Goals	Apps	Goals	Apps	Goals
Neftchi Baku	2011–12	Azerbaijan Premier League	1	0	0	0	–		–		1	0
Khazar Lankaran	2012–13	Azerbaijan Premier League	19	1	5	4	–		–		24	5
Khazar Lankaran	2013–14	Azerbaijan Premier League	21	1	1	0	0	0	1	0	22	1
Khazar Lankaran	2014–15	Azerbaijan Premier League	20	5	2	0	–		–		22	5
Khazar Lankaran	Total		60	7	8	4	0	0	1	0	69	11
Sumgayit	2015–16	Azerbaijan Premier League	33	5	3	0	–		–		36	5
Inter Baku	2016–17	Azerbaijan Premier League	13	4	3	1	–		–		16	5
Qarabağ	2016–17	Azerbaijan Premier League	12	0	3	0	–		–		15	0
Qarabağ	2017–18	Azerbaijan Premier League	6	0	0	0	4	0	–		10	0
Qarabağ	Total		18	0	3	0	4	0	–	–	25	0
Sabail FK	2018–19	Azerbaijan Premier League	20	7	3	1	–		–		23	8
Sabail FK	2019–20	Azerbaijan Premier League	13	3	2	0	2	3	–		17	6
Sabail FK	Total		33	10	5	1	2	3	–	–	40	14
Zira	2019–20	Azerbaijan Premier League	4	3	0	0	–		–		4	3
Zira	2020–21	Azerbaijan Premier League	22	6	2	0	–		–		24	6
Zira	2021–22	Azerbaijan Premier League	21	3	2	1	–		–		23	4
Zira	Total		47	12	4	1	–	–	–	–	51	13
Sabail	2022–23	Azerbaijan Premier League	23	5	3	0	–		–		26	5
Sabail	2023–24	Azerbaijan Premier League	14	1	0	0	–		–		14	1
Sabail	Total		37	6	3	0	–	–	0	0	40	6
Career total			242	44	29	7	6	3	1	0	278	54

=== International ===
As of 14 September 2024

	Year	Apps	Goals
Azerbaijan U-18	2015	8	2
Azerbaijan national team	2014	1	0
Azerbaijan national team	2015	1	1
Azerbaijan national team	2016	5	0
Azerbaijan national team	2017	1	0
Azerbaijan national team	2018	5	0
Azerbaijan national team	2019	1	0
Azerbaijan national team	2020	5	0
Azerbaijan national team	Total	19	1
Career total		27	3

== Honours ==
=== Club ===
Neftchi Baku

- Azerbaijan Premier League (1): 2011–2012

Qarabag

- Azerbaijan Premier League (1): 2016–17

Khazar Lankaran

- Azerbaijan Supercup (1): 2013

=== International ===
Azerbaijan U23

- Islamic Solidarity Games: (1) 2017
