= Cătălin Țîră =

Romanian footballer

Personal information
- Full name: Cătălin Ștefan Țîră
- Date of birth: 18 June 1994 (age 32)
- Place of birth: Bucharest, Romania
- Height: 1.85 m (6 ft 1 in)
- Position: Forward

Youth career
- 2001–2009: Dinamo București
- 2009–2010: Udinese
- 2010–2013: Lazio

Senior career*
Years	Team	Apps	(Gls)
2013–2014	ADO Den Haag	1	(0)
2014–2015	FC Brașov	19	(2)
2015–2016	Concordia Chiajna	7	(0)
2016	Rapid București	8	(0)
2016	Neftchi Baku	8	(1)
2017	Dunărea Călărași	12	(3)
2017–2018	Juventus București	16	(2)
2018	ACS Șirineasa	5	(4)
2018	Viitorul Constanța	0	(0)
2018	Luceafărul Oradea	10	(1)
2019	Episkopi		
2019–2020	Voluntari	25	(5)
2020–2021	Rapid București	9	(0)
2021	Sūduva	6	(0)
2021–2022	Dinamo București	6	(0)
2022	Bisceglie	3	(2)
2022–2023	Dinamo București	20	(1)
2024–2025	CSM Slatina	9	(1)
2025	Voluntari	1	(0)

International career
2013–2014	Romania U21	3	(1)
- * Club domestic league appearances and goals as of 8 March 2025

Ștefan Cătălin Țîră (born 18 June 1994) is a Romanian professional footballer who plays as a forward.

His father, Fănel Țîră was also a footballer who spent most of his career at Rapid București.

== Career ==
On 1 August 2016, Țîră signed a one-year contract with Azerbaijan Premier League side Neftchi Baku.

On 25 October 2016, Țîră was sent-off in Neftchi's 2–0 defeat to Qarabağ, for hitting a pitch invader, and was subsequently banned from training. before having his contract with the club terminated on 30 October 2016.

On 11 August 2019, Țîră made his debut for Voluntari against Liga I rivals FCSB and scored after just 36 seconds in a 3–1 win.

In 2021 he became a member of Lithuanian Sūduva. On 23 June 2021 he left club. He played six matches in Optibet A lyga and twice in I lyga.

He joined Romanian side Dinamo București in September 2021. He made six appearances for the club in Liga I during the 2021–22 season, only one as a starting player. Țîră also played 2 games for Dinamo București in the Romanian Cup, scoring his single official goal for the club in the match lost against FC Argeș in the round of 16 match. He was released by the club in January 2022. He returned to Dinamo în August 2022.

== Honours ==
Lazio Youth

- Campionato Primavera: 2012–13

Rapid București

- Liga II: 2015–16

ACS Șirineasa

- Liga III: 2017–18
