= Pessalli =

Brazilian footballer (1990–2017)

Personal information
- Full name: Jonas Henrique Pessalli
- Date of birth: 24 September 1990
- Place of birth: Bento Gonçalves, Brazil
- Date of death: 12 June 2017 (aged 26)
- Place of death: Curitiba, Brazil
- Height: 1.78 m (5 ft 10 in)
- Position: Midfielder

Youth career
- Grêmio

Senior career*
Years	Team	Apps	(Gls)
2009–2013	Grêmio	6	(0)
2012	→ Grêmio Barueri (loan)	13	(1)
2013	→ Angers (loan)	1	(0)
2013–2016	Angers	28	(3)
2016	→ Luçon (loan)	14	(4)
2016	Neftchi Baku	7	(3)
2017	Paraná	0	(0)
- * Club domestic league appearances and goals

Jonas Henrique Pessalli (24 September 1990 – 12 June 2017) was a Brazilian professional footballer who played as a midfielder.

== Career ==
Pessalli played with Grêmio Barueri on loan from Grêmio.

In October 2016, he signed with Neftchi Baku until the end of the 2016–17 season.

== Death ==
On 12 June 2017, Pessalli lost control of his Audi A5 Sportback when going around a corner and crashed sideways against a utility pole. The crash was so strong that it tore the pole off the ground. Pessalli died on the spot because of his injuries. He was 26.

== Career statistics ==
As of match played 19 April 2017

Appearances and goals by club, season and competition
Club	Season	League			National cup		League cup		Continental		Other		Total	
Club	Season	Division	Apps	Goals	Apps	Goals	Apps	Goals	Apps	Goals	Apps	Goals	Apps	Goals
Angers	2012–13	Ligue 2	1	0	0	0	0	0	–		–		1	0
Angers	2013–14	Ligue 2	12	1	2	1	1	0	–		–		15	2
Angers	2014–15	Ligue 2	16	2	2	3	2	0	–		–		20	5
Angers	2015–16	Ligue 1	0	0	0	0	0	0	–		–		0	0
Angers	2016–17	Ligue 1	0	0	0	0	0	0	–		–		0	0
Angers	Total		29	3	4	4	3	0	0	0	0	0	36	7
Neftchi Baku	2016–17	Azerbaijan Premier League	7	1	3	3	–		0	0	–		10	4
Paraná	2017	Série B	0	0	3	0	–		–		5	1	8	1
Career total			36	4	10	7	3	0	0	0	5	1	54	12
