= Namiq Ələsgərov =

Azerbaijani footballer (born 1995)

Personal information
- Full name: Namiq Əvəz oğlu Ələsgərov
- Date of birth: 3 February 1995 (age 31)
- Place of birth: Çiləgir, Azerbaijan
- Height: 1.73 m (5 ft 8 in)
- Position: Attacking midfielder

Team information
- Current team: Zira
- Number: 70

Youth career
- Baku

Senior career*
| Years | Team | Apps | (Gls) |
| 2012–2014 | Baku | 19 | (2) |
| 2014–2016 | Qarabağ | 26 | (1) |
| 2016 | → Kapaz (loan) | 15 | (3) |
| 2017–2021 | Neftçi | 106 | (29) |
| 2021–2022 | Bursaspor | 28 | (6) |
| 2022–2025 | Sabah | 70 | (7) |
| 2025– | Zira | 10 | (0) |

International career^{‡}
| 2010–2011 | Azerbaijan U17 | 6 | (1) |
| 2012–2013 | Azerbaijan U19 | 5 | (0) |
| 2014–2016 | Azerbaijan U21 | 5 | (3) |
| 2015– | Azerbaijan | 39 | (0) |
- * Club domestic league appearances and goals as of 22 June 2026 ‡ National team caps and goals as of 4 May 2023

Namiq Əvəz oğlu Ələsgərov (born 3 February 1995) is an Azerbaijani professional footballer who plays as an attacking midfielder for Zira and the Azerbaijan national team.

== Career ==
=== Club ===
Ələsgərov is the product of the youth academy of FC Baku and made his debut for the senior team at the age of 17. During the summer of 2014, he transferred to Qarabağ. Despite a strong start, Ələsgərov suffered an injury in March 2015, leaving him out of the team until the end of 2015. In 2016, Namiq was loaned out to Kapaz.

Ələsgərov left Qarabağ on 26 December 2016, signing for Neftçi PFK the following day. On 28 July 2020, Ələsgərov extended his contract with Neftçi until the summer of 2022.

The 2020-2021 season became a breakthrough season for Namiq Ələsgərov as he became the top goal scorer of the Azerbaijani Premier League with 19 goals in 26 matches and helped Neftçi win its first league title since 2013.

=== International ===
On 28 March 2015 Ələsgərov made his senior international debut for Azerbaijan game against Malta.

== Career statistics ==
=== Club ===
As of match played 13 June 2021

Appearances and goals by club, season and competition
| Club | Season | League | | | National Cup | | Continental | | Other | | Total | |
| Club | Season | Division | Apps | Goals | Apps | Goals | Apps | Goals | Apps | Goals | Apps | Goals |
|---|---|---|---|---|---|---|---|---|---|---|---|---|
| Baku | 2011–12 | Azerbaijan Premier League | 1 | 0 | 0 | 0 | - | | - | | 1 | 0 |
| Baku | 2012–13 | Azerbaijan Premier League | 3 | 0 | 0 | 0 | - | | - | | 3 | 0 |
| Baku | 2013–14 | Azerbaijan Premier League | 15 | 2 | 0 | 0 | - | | - | | 15 | 2 |
| Qarabağ | 2014–15 | Azerbaijan Premier League | 18 | 1 | 0 | 0 | 5 | 0 | - | | 23 | 1 |
| Qarabağ | 2015–16 | Azerbaijan Premier League | 0 | 0 | 0 | 0 | 0 | 0 | - | | 0 | 0 |
| Qarabağ | 2016–17 | Azerbaijan Premier League | 8 | 0 | 0 | 0 | 3 | 0 | - | | 11 | 0 |
| Kapaz (loan) | 2015–16 | Azerbaijan Premier League | 15 | 3 | 0 | 0 | 0 | 0 | - | | 15 | 3 |
| Neftçi Baku | 2016–17 | Azerbaijan Premier League | 12 | 0 | 0 | 0 | - | | - | | 12 | 0 |
| Neftçi Baku | 2017–18 | Azerbaijan Premier League | 27 | 5 | 5 | 1 | - | | - | | 32 | 6 |
| Neftçi Baku | 2018–19 | Azerbaijan Premier League | 23 | 3 | 2 | 1 | 1 | 0 | - | | 26 | 4 |
| Neftçi Baku | 2019–20 | Azerbaijan Premier League | 18 | 0 | 2 | 0 | 4 | 1 | - | | 24 | 1 |
| Neftçi Baku | 2020–21 | Azerbaijan Premier League | 26 | 19 | 2 | 0 | 2 | 0 | - | | 30 | 19 |
| Career total | | | 166 | 33 | 11 | 2 | 15 | 1 | - | - | 192 | 36 |

=== International ===
As of 13 June 2021

Azerbaijan
| Year | Apps | Goals |
|---|---|---|
| 2015 | 1 | 0 |
| 2016 | 5 | 0 |
| 2017 | 4 | 0 |
| 2018 | 4 | 0 |
| 2019 | 1 | 0 |
| 2020 | 4 | 0 |
| 2021 | 5 | 0 |
| Total | 24 | 0 |

== Honours ==
Baku

- Azerbaijan Cup: 2011–12

Qarabağ

- Azerbaijan Premier League: 2014–15
- Azerbaijan Cup: 2014–15

Neftçi

- Azerbaijan Premier League: 2020–21

Sabah

- Azerbaijan Cup: 2024–25

Individual

- Azerbaijan Premier League top scorer: 2020–21
