= Boban Bajković =

Montenegrin footballer

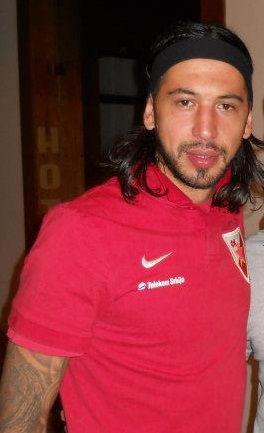
- Bajković in 2011

Personal information
- Full name: Boban Bajković
- Date of birth: 15 March 1985 (age 41)
- Place of birth: Cetinje, SFR Yugoslavia
- Height: 1.88 m (6 ft 2 in)
- Position: Goalkeeper

Team information
- Current team: Sharjah (Goalkeeper coach)

Youth career
- Lovćen

Senior career*
Years	Team	Apps	(Gls)
2001–2003	Lovćen	30	(0)
2004–2014	Red Star Belgrade	100	(0)
2004–2005	→ Jedinstvo Ub (loan)	31	(0)
2006	→ Rad (loan)	6	(0)
2007	→ Smederevo (loan)	7	(0)
2007	→ Srem (loan)	17	(0)
2014–2015	Lierse	26	(0)
2016–2017	Neftçi	14	(0)
Total		231	(0)

Managerial career
- 2017–2019: Red Star Belgrade (Youth goalkeeper coach)
- 2020: Kayserispor (Goalkeeper coach)
- 2020: Denizlispor (Goalkeeper coach)
- 2022: Olimpija Ljubljana (Goalkeeper coach)
- 2023–2025: Al Wasl (Goalkeeper coach)
- 2025–: Sharjah (Goalkeeper coach)
- * Club domestic league appearances and goals

Boban Bajković (Serbian Cyrillic: Бобан Бајковић; born 15 March 1985) is a Montenegrin former professional footballer who played as a goalkeeper.

== Club career ==
Born in Cetinje, Bajković made his first senior appearances with his hometown club Lovćen in the 2001–02 Second League of FR Yugoslavia. He later spent some time on trial at Red Star Belgrade in 2003, but returned to his parent club eventually.

In January 2004, Bajković was officially transferred to Red Star Belgrade. He subsequently went on loans to Jedinstvo Ub (2004–05), Rad (2006), Smederevo (2007), and Srem (2007). In early 2008, Bajković returned to Red Star and made his first competitive appearances for the club in the 2007–08 Serbian SuperLiga. He failed to receive any playing time in the following two seasons. After the arrival of Robert Prosinečki midway through the 2010–11 season, Bajković became the first-choice goalkeeper. He also played regularly under Slaviša Stojanovič in the title-winning 2013–14 campaign. Subsequently, Bajković left the club following the expiration of his contract.

In September 2014, Bajković signed with Belgian club Lierse on a one-year deal, rejoining his former manager Slaviša Stojanovič. He also played for Azerbaijani club Neftçi in the 2016–17 season, before hanging up his boots.

== Statistics ==
Club	Season	League		Cup		Continental		Total	
Club	Season	Apps	Goals	Apps	Goals	Apps	Goals	Apps	Goals
Red Star Belgrade	2003–04	0	0	0	0	0	0	0	0
Red Star Belgrade	2004–05	0	0	0	0	0	0	0	0
Red Star Belgrade	2005–06	0	0	0	0	0	0	0	0
Red Star Belgrade	2006–07	0	0	0	0	0	0	0	0
Red Star Belgrade	2007–08	4	0	0	0	0	0	4	0
Red Star Belgrade	2008–09	0	0	0	0	0	0	0	0
Red Star Belgrade	2009–10	0	0	0	0	0	0	0	0
Red Star Belgrade	2010–11	10	0	1	0	0	0	11	0
Red Star Belgrade	2011–12	29	0	3	0	4	0	36	0
Red Star Belgrade	2012–13	28	0	0	0	6	0	34	0
Red Star Belgrade	2013–14	29	0	1	0	4	0	34	0
Red Star Belgrade	Total	100	0	5	0	14	0	119	0

== Honours ==
Red Star Belgrade

- Serbian SuperLiga: 2013–14
- Serbian Cup: 2009–10, 2011–12
