= 2016–17 Azerbaijan Premier League =

Azerbaijan Premier League
- Season: 2016–17
- Dates: 6 August 2016 – 29 April 2017
- Champions: Qarabağ (5th title)
- Relegated: AZAL
- Champions League: Qarabağ
- Europa League: Gabala; Inter Baku; Zira
- Matches: 112
- Goals: 251 (2.24 per match)
- Biggest home win: Qarabağ 6–0 AZAL (9 September 2016)
- Biggest away win: Neftçi Baku 0–8 Gabala (10 September 2016)
- Highest scoring: Neftçi Baku 0–8 Gabala (10 September 2016)

The 2016–17 Azerbaijan Premier League was the 25th season of the Azerbaijan Premier League, the top tier Azerbaijani professional league for association football clubs, since its establishment in 1992. Qarabağ were the defending champions, having won the previous season. The season began on 6 August 2016 and concluded on 29 April 2017.

On 16 April 2017, Qarabağ defeated Inter Baku 3–0 to successfully defend their league title - their fourth league title in a row and fifth overall.

== Teams ==
On 13 June 2016 the Professional Football League of Azerbaijan announced that both Khazar Lankaran and Ravan had been refused licenses to play in the 2016–17 Premier League and that no First Division teams would replace them.

On 25 April 2017, Zira were awarded a 3–0 victory over Neftçi Baku after Neftçi Baku fielded 7 foreign players in their 2–2 draw on 23 April 2017.

Locations of the 2016–17 Azerbaijan Premier League teams.
Team in italics is from a zone of the Nagorno-Karabakh conflict and is playing its home games in Baku.

Note: Table lists in alphabetical order.

Team	Location	Venue	Capacity
AZAL	Baku	AZAL Stadium	5,000
Gabala	Qabala	Gabala City Stadium	2,000
Inter Baku	Baku	Inter Arena	8,125
Neftçi Baku	Baku	Bakcell Arena	11,000
Qarabağ	Baku	Azersun Arena	5,800
Sumgayit	Sumqayit	Kapital Bank Arena	1,500
Zira	Baku	Zira Olympic Sport Complex Stadium	1,500
Kapaz	Ganja	Ganja City Stadium	27,000

=== Personnel and kits ===
Note: Flags indicate national team as has been defined under FIFA eligibility rules. Players may hold more than one non-FIFA nationality.

Team	Manager	Team captain	Kit manufacturer	Shirt sponsor
AZAL	(Azerbaijan) Tarlan Ahmadov	(Azerbaijan) Emin Jafarguliyev	Joma	Silk Way
Gabala	(Ukraine) Roman Hryhorchuk	(Azerbaijan) Rashad Sadiqov	Joma	QafqaZ Hotels
Inter Baku	(Georgia (country)) Zaur Svanadze	(Azerbaijan) Nizami Hajiyev	Joma	IBA
Neftçi Baku	(Azerbaijan) Elkhan Abdullayev	(Azerbaijan) Ruslan Abışov	Kappa	Asan Xidmət
Qarabağ	(Azerbaijan) Gurban Gurbanov	(Azerbaijan) Rashad Sadygov	Adidas	Azersun
Sumgayit	(Azerbaijan) Samir Abbasov	(Azerbaijan) Vurğun Hüseynov	Joma	Azerkimya
Zira	(Azerbaijan) Aykhan Abbasov	(Azerbaijan) Elvin Mammadov	Umbro	Santral
Kapaz	(Azerbaijan) Shahin Diniyev	(Azerbaijan) Tural Akhundov	Umbro	Gəncə 4000

=== Stadiums ===
Gabala	Inter Baku	Kapaz	Neftçi Baku
Gabala City Stadium	Inter Arena	Ganja City Stadium	Bakcell Arena
Capacity: 2,000	Capacity: 8,125	Capacity: 27,000	Capacity: 11,000
Qarabağ	Səbail	Sumgayit	Zira
Azersun Arena	Bayil Arena	Kapital Bank Arena	Zira Olympic Sport Complex Stadium
Capacity: 5,800	Capacity: 5,000	Capacity: 1,500	Capacity: 1,500

=== Managerial changes ===
Team	Outgoing manager	Manner of departure	Date of vacancy	Position in table	Incoming manager	Date of appointment
Neftçi Baku	(Azerbaijan) Vali Gasimov	Sacked	14 September 2016	7th	(Azerbaijan) Elkhan Abdullayev	15 September 2016
Zira	(Azerbaijan) Adil Shukurov	Mutual termination	27 December 2016	6th	(Azerbaijan) Aykhan Abbasov	27 December 2016

== League table ==
Pos	Team	Pld	W	D	L	GF	GA	GD	Pts	Qualification or relegation
1	Qarabağ (C)	28	19	5	4	46	14	+32	62	Qualification for the Champions League second qualifying round (Note: Qarabağ qualified for the Europa League second qualifying round by winning the 2016–17 Azerbaijan Cup. However, since they already qualified for European competition based on their league position, the spot awarded to the cup winners was passed down the league.)
2	Gabala	28	14	10	4	48	21	+27	52	Qualification for the Europa League second qualifying round
3	Inter Baku	28	11	10	7	39	33	+6	43	Qualification for the Europa League first qualifying round
4	Zira	28	10	9	9	29	26	+3	39	Qualification for the Europa League first qualifying round
5	Kapaz	28	9	9	10	24	27	−3	36	
6	Sumgayit	28	9	8	11	28	35	−7	35	
7	Neftçi Baku	28	9	2	17	24	45	−21	29	
8	AZAL (R)	28	1	7	20	13	50	−37	10	Relegation to the Azerbaijan First Division

Source: PFL (in Azerbaijani), UEFA, Soccerway
Rules for classification: 1) Points; 2) Head-to-head points; 3) Head-to-head goal difference; 4) Head-to-head goals scored; 5) Head-to-head away goals scored (only if two teams); 6) Goal difference; 7) Goals scored.
(C) Champions; (R) Relegated

== Results ==
=== Games 1–14 ===
Home \ Away	AZL	INT	NEF	QAR	GAB	SUM	ZIR	KAP
AZAL	—	1–3	0–2	0–1	0–0	1–1	1–1	0–1
Inter Baku	3–0	—	2–1	2–1	1–1	3–1	1–1	2–2
Neftçi Baku	0–1	2–1	—	0–2	0–8	1–2	0–1	2–0
Qarabağ	6–0	0–0	3–0	—	2–1	3–0	2–0	1–0
Gabala	3–0	0–0	4–1	2–0	—	2–0	1–0	2–0
Sumgayit	1–1	1–2	2–0	0–2	2–2	—	1–0	1–1
Zira	3–1	1–1	2–0	0–2	0–2	0–1	—	2–0
Kapaz	0–0	0–0	2–0	1–1	1–1	0–0	2–0	—

Source: Professional Football League (in Azerbaijani)
Legend: Blue = home team win; Yellow = draw; Red = away team win.

=== Games 15–28 ===
Home \ Away	AZL	INT	NEF	QAR	GAB	SUM	ZIR	KAP
AZAL	—	0–1	0–1	1–2	1–1	1–2	0–3	1–2
Inter Baku	2–1	—	1–3	0–3	0–2	1–0	1–1	4–1
Neftçi Baku	4–0	2–1	—	1–2	1–0	1–0	1–2	0–0
Qarabağ	1–0	0–1	1–1	—	0–0	2–1	2–0	2–1
Gabala	2–0	4–3	1–0	2–0	—	1–1	1–1	2–1
Sumgayit	1–0	2–2	2–0	0–4	2–1	—	1–1	3–1
Zira	2–1	1–1	3–0 (Note: Match awarded 3–0 to Zira due to Neftçi Baku breaching league rules; original result was 2–2 draw.)	0–0	2–2	1–0	—	1–0
Kapaz	1–1	1–0	2–0	0–1	2–0	1–0	1–0	—

Source: Professional Football League (in Azerbaijani)
Legend: Blue = home team win; Yellow = draw; Red = away team win.

== Season statistics ==
=== Top scorers ===
As of match played 29 April 2017

Rank	Player	Club	Goals
1	(Croatia) Filip Ozobić	Gabala	11
1	(Azerbaijan) Rauf Aliyev	Inter Baku	11
3	(South Africa) Dino Ndlovu	Qarabağ	10
4	(Azerbaijan) Mirabdulla Abbasov	Sumqayıt	8
5	(France) Bagaliy Dabo	Gabala	7
5	(Azerbaijan) Nizami Hajiyev	Inter Baku	7
7	(Cameroon) Julien Ebah	Kapaz	6
7	(Azerbaijan) Amil Yunanov	Sumqayıt	6
7	(Estonia) Sergei Zenjov	Gabala	6
10	(Azerbaijan) Ruslan Abışov	Inter Baku	5
10	(Azerbaijan) Tural Akhundov	Kapaz	5

=== Hat-tricks ===
Player	For	Against	Result	Date	Ref.
(France) Bagaliy Dabo	Gabala	Neftchi Baku	8–0	10 September 2016	

=== Scoring ===
- First goal of the season: Elvin Badalov for Neftçi Baku against AZAL (6 August 2016)
- Fastest goal of the season: 2nd minute,
  - Reynaldo for Qarabağ against AZAL (9 September 2016)
