= Tarlan Guliyev =

Azerbaijani footballer (born 1992)

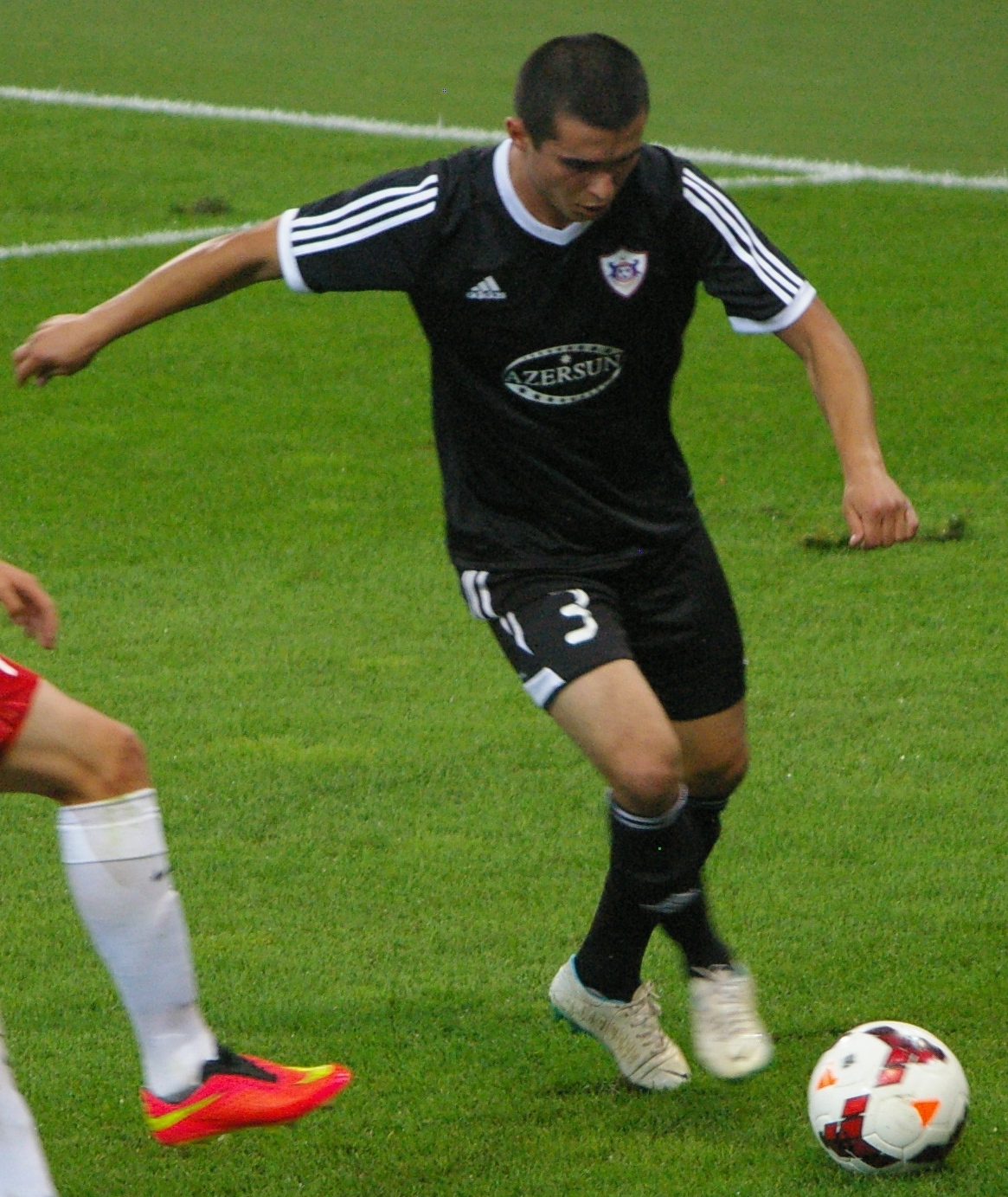
- Guliyev in 2014

Personal information
- Full name: Tarlan Shahmurad oglu Guliyev
- Date of birth: 19 April 1992 (age 34)
- Place of birth: Baku, Azerbaijan
- Height: 1.76 m (5 ft 9 in)
- Position: Defender

Team information
- Current team: İmişli
- Number: 3

Senior career*
Years	Team	Apps	(Gls)
2009–2014	Neftçi Bakı	48	(0)
2012	→ Sumqayıt (loan)	10	(0)
2014–2016	Qarabağ	8	(0)
2015–2016	→ Kapaz (loan)	35	(1)
2016–2022	Shamakhi	106	(2)
2022–2024	Turan Tovuz	27	(1)
2024–	İmişli		

International career^{‡}
2008–2009	Azerbaijan U17	6	(1)
2009	Azerbaijan U19	7	(0)
2009–2014	Azerbaijan U21	18	(0)
2014–2017	Azerbaijan	7	(1)
- * Club domestic league appearances and goals as of 17 May 2024 ‡ National team caps and goals as of 9 March 2017

Tarlan Guliyev (Azerbaijani: Tərlan Quliyev, born on 19 April 1992) is an Azerbaijani professional footballer who plays as a defender for İmişli.

== Career statistics ==
=== Club ===
As of 21 May 2016

Season	Club	League	League		Cup		Other		Total	
Season	Club	League	App	Goals	App	Goals	App	Goals	App	Goals
Azerbaijan			League		Azerbaijan Cup		Europe		Total	
2009–10	Neftchi Baku	Azerbaijan Premier League	1	0			-		1	0
2010–11	Neftchi Baku	Azerbaijan Premier League	5	0			-		5	0
2011–12	Neftchi Baku	Azerbaijan Premier League	5	0			-		5	0
2011–12	Sumgayit (loan)	Azerbaijan Premier League	10	0	0	0	-		10	0
2012–13	Neftchi Baku	Azerbaijan Premier League	22	0	2	0	6	0	30	0
2013–14	Neftchi Baku	Azerbaijan Premier League	15	0	2	0	0	0	17	0
2014–15	Qarabağ	Azerbaijan Premier League	8	0	1	0	2	0	11	0
2015–16	Kapaz (loan)	Azerbaijan Premier League	35	1	1	0	-		36	1
Total			101	1	6	0	8	0	115	1

=== International ===
Scores and results list Azerbaijan's goal tally first.

No	Date	Venue	Opponent	Score	Result	Competition
1.	9 March 2017	Jassim Bin Hamad Stadium, Doha, Qatar	Qatar	1–0	2–1	Friendly
