= 2009–10 FC Inter Baku season =

Inter Baku
2009–10 season
- President: Jahangir Hajiyev
- Manager: Kakhaber Tskhadadze
- Stadium: Shafa Stadium
- Premier League: 1st Champions
- Azerbaijan Cup: Semi-finals vs Baku
- UEFA Europa League: First Qualifying Round vs Spartak Trnava
- Top goalscorer: League: Robertas Poškus (12); All: Robertas Poškus (14)
- Highest home attendance: 5,000 vs Khazar Lankaran; 6 December 2009
- Lowest home attendance: 300 vs Olimpik-Shuvalan; 13 September 2009
- Average home league attendance: 1,562
Home colours	Away colours

The Inter Baku 2009–10 season was Inter Baku's ninth Azerbaijan Premier League season, and their first season under manager Kakhaber Tskhadadze. Inter finished as Champions of the Azerbaijan Premier League, earning themselves entry into the 2010–11 UEFA Champions League at the Second qualifying round stage. They also participated in the 2009–Azerbaijan Cup, getting knocked out in the Semi-Final stage by eventual winners FK Baku, and the UEFA Europa League where they were beaten in the first qualifying round by Spartak Trnava of Slovakia 5-2 on aggregate.

== Squad ==
Note: Flags indicate national team as defined under FIFA eligibility rules; some limited exceptions apply. Players may hold more than one non-FIFA nationality.

No.	Pos.	Nation	Player
1	GK	BRA	Wilson Júnior
3	DF	AZE	Ruhid Yusubov
4	DF	BRA	Accioly
5	DF	SRB	Milan Zagorac
6	MF	AZE	Aliyar Ismailov
7	FW	URU	Ángel Gutiérrez
9	DF	AZE	Samir Abbasov
10	MF	BRA	Sergio Oliveira
11	MF	AZE	Asif Mammadov
12	DF	AZE	Khayal Mustafayev
13	MF	CZE	Bronislav Červenka
14	MF	BUL	Petar Zlatinov
15	DF	AZE	Volodimir Levin
16	MF	AZE	Tofig Mikayilov
17	MF	AZE	Rovshan Amiraslanov
18	MF	SRB	Goran Arnaut
19	MF	GEO	David Odikadze

No.	Pos.	Nation	Player
20	FW	LAT	Ģirts Karlsons
24	MF	LAT	Andrejs Rubins
27	DF	SVK	Lubomír Kubica
29	MF	AZE	Orkhan Mammadov
30	DF	GEO	Kakhaber Mzhavanadze
32	FW	LTU	Robertas Poškus
34	MF	AZE	Aleksandr Chertoganov
42	GK	AZE	Salahat Aghayev
72	GK	GEO	Giorgi Lomaia
84	DF	BRA	Filipe Machado
—	DF	GEO	Giorgi Navalovski (loan from Anzhi Makhachkala)
—	DF	LTU	Paulius Paknys
—	MF	AZE	Nizami Hajiyev
—	MF	AZE	Jamal Mammadov
—	MF	AZE	Tofig Mikayılov
—	FW	AZE	Elnur Abdulov
—	FW	BRA	Leonardo Rocha

=== Out on loan ===
Note: Flags indicate national team as defined under FIFA eligibility rules; some limited exceptions apply. Players may hold more than one non-FIFA nationality.

No. / Pos. / Nation / Player; 2 / DF / AZE / Shahriyar Rahimov (at FK Karvan)	No. / Pos. / Nation / Player; 8 / MF / AZE / Rovshan Amiraslanov (at FK Karvan)

== Transfers ==
=== Summer ===
In: Note: Flags indicate national team as defined under FIFA eligibility rules; some limited exceptions apply. Players may hold more than one non-FIFA nationality.

No.	Pos.	Nation	Player
10	MF	BRA	Sergio Oliveira (From (Turkey) Sivasspor)
19	MF	GEO	David Odikadze (From (Hungary) Győri ETO)
20	DF	AZE	Mahir Shukurov (From (Azerbaijan) Olimpik Baku)
20	FW	LAT	Ģirts Karlsons (From (Latvia) Liepājas Metalurgs)
21	FW	LTU	Robertas Poškus (From (Russia) Ural Sverdlovsk Oblast)
27	DF	SVK	Lubomír Kubica (From (Israel) Ashdod)
30	DF	GEO	Kakhaber Mzhavanadze (From (Moldova) Dacia Chişinău)
34	MF	AZE	Aleksandr Chertoganov (From (Azerbaijan) Simurq)
72	GK	GEO	Giorgi Lomaia (From (Georgia (country)) Lokomotivi Tbilisi)
—	MF	AZE	Nizami Hajiyev (From (Azerbaijan) Khazar Lankaran)
—	FW	BRA	Leonardo Rocha (From (Azerbaijan) Standard Baku)

Out: Note: Flags indicate national team as defined under FIFA eligibility rules; some limited exceptions apply. Players may hold more than one non-FIFA nationality.

No.	Pos.	Nation	Player
10	FW	AZE	Khagani Mammadov (to (Azerbaijan) FK Karvan)
17	MF	AZE	Elvin Mammadov (to (Azerbaijan) Qarabağ)
22	FW	URU	Walter Guglielmone (to (Azerbaijan) Neftchi Baku)
28	FW	BOL	Augusto Andaveris (loan return to (Bolivia) La Paz)
30	MF	LAT	Vladimirs Koļesņičenko (to (Latvia) Skonto Riga)
34	MF	BRA	Adriano Gabiru (loan return to (Brazil) Internacional)

=== Winter ===
In: Note: Flags indicate national team as defined under FIFA eligibility rules; some limited exceptions apply. Players may hold more than one non-FIFA nationality.

No.	Pos.	Nation	Player
—	DF	BRA	Filipe Machado (from (Italy) Salernitana)
—	DF	LTU	Paulius Paknys (from (Poland) Korona Kielce)
—	DF	GEO	Giorgi Navalovski (Loan from (Russia) Anzhi Makhachkala)

Out: Note: Flags indicate national team as defined under FIFA eligibility rules; some limited exceptions apply. Players may hold more than one non-FIFA nationality.

No.	Pos.	Nation	Player
2	DF	AZE	Shahriyar Rahimov (on loan to (Azerbaijan) FK Karvan)
20	DF	AZE	Mahir Shukurov (to (Russia) Anzhi Makhachkala)
25	FW	AZE	Javid Huseynov (to (Azerbaijan) Neftchi Baku)
—	MF	BRA	Cleiton (loan return to (Brazil) ASA)

== Competitions ==
=== Azerbaijan Premier League ===
==== Results ====
15 August 2009 1	Inter Baku	1 - 0	FK Karvan	Shafa Stadium
19:00 AZST (UTC+5)	Karlsons 70'	Summary	Yadullayev (yellow card) 60' (yellow-red card) 68'	Attendance: 416; Referee: Fariz Yusifov

21 August 2009 2	Khazar Lankaran	1 - 0	Inter Baku	Lankaran City Stadium
19:00 AZST (UTC+5)	Calincov 85'; Dzhambazov (yellow card) 3' (yellow-red card) 86'	Summary		Attendance: 10,500; Referee: Vusal Aliyev

13 September 2009 4	Inter Baku	2 - 2	Olimpik-Shuvalan	Shafa Stadium
18:00 AZST (UTC+5)	Karlsons 78'; Rubins 84'	Summary	Goginashvili 5'; Doroş 50'	Attendance: 300; Referee: Anar Salmanov

19 September 2009 5	Turan Tovuz	0 - 1	Inter Baku	Tovuz City Stadium
17:00 AZST (UTC+5)		Summary	Červenka 21'	Attendance: 2,500; Referee: Elchin Mämmädov

26 September 2009 6	Inter Baku	3 - 2	Gabala	Shafa Stadium
17:00 AZST (UTC+5)	Levin 68'; Rocha 88'; Karlsons 90'	Summary	Melnyk 36'; Torres 69'	Attendance: 750; Referee: Aliyar Agayev

18 October 2009 7	Mughan	1 - 6	Inter Baku	Salyan Olympic Sport Complex Stadium
16:00 AZST (UTC+5)	Yaméogo 30' (pen.)	Summary	Rubins 15', 18'; Rocha 24'; Abbasov; Poškus 72', 86'	Attendance: 1,500; Referee: Rovshan Ahmadov

22 October 2009 3	Inter Baku	1 - 0	Baku	Shafa Stadium
17:10 AZST (UTC+5)	Rocha 32'	Summary		Attendance: 1,000; Referee: Vusal Aliyev

25 October 2009 8	Inter Baku	4 - 2	Standard	Shafa Stadium
18:00 AZST (UTC+5)	Abbasov 19'; Zlatinov 21'; Mzhavanadze 59'; A.Gutiérrez 83'	Summary	Guliyev 75'; Zargarov 90'	Attendance: 850; Referee: Elnur Muradov

31 October 2009 9	Simurq	1 - 1	Inter Baku	Zaqatala City Stadium
18:00 AZT (UTC+4)	Chkhetiani 6'	Summary	Odikadze 49'	Attendance: 1,000; Referee: Vusal Aliyev

7 November 2009 10	Inter Baku	2 - 1	Qarabağ	Shafa Stadium
17:15 AZT (UTC+4)	Poškus 58'; Rocha 66'	Summary	Sadygov 87'	Attendance: 2,000; Referee: Fariz Yusifov

22 November 2009 11	Neftchi Baku	2 - 1	Inter Baku	Tofik Bakhramov Stadium
14:00 AZT (UTC+4)	Guglielmone 21'; Aliyev 76'	Summary	Poškus 66'; Shukurov (yellow card) 5' (yellow-red card) 90'	Attendance: 1,500; Referee: Vusal Aliyev

29 November 2009 12	Karvan	0 - 2	Inter Baku	Yevlakh Stadium
14:00 AZT (UTC+4)		Summary	Zlatinov 55'; Poškus 85'	Attendance: 500; Referee: Anar Salmanov

6 December 2009 13	Inter Baku	1 - 1	Khazar Lankaran	Shafa Stadium
17:10 AZT (UTC+4)	Rocha 50'	Summary	Mario Sergio 5'	Attendance: 5,000; Referee: Rovshan Ahmadov

9 December 2009 14	Baku	2 - 0	Inter Baku	Tofig Bakhramov Stadium
14:15 AZT (UTC+4)	Jabá 62'; Skulić 79'	Summary		Attendance: 200; Referee: Anar Salmanov

13 December 2009 15	Olimpik-Shuvalan	0 - 1	Inter Baku	Shafa Stadium
16:00 AZT (UTC+4)		Summary	Karlsons 47'	Attendance: 400; Referee: Elnur Muradov

19 December 2009 16	Inter Baku	3 - 1	Turan Tovuz	Shafa Stadium
16:00 AZT (UTC+4)	Karlsons 44', 87', 90+1'	Summary	Onila 38' (pen.)	Attendance: 500; Referee: Rauf Jabbarov

24 December 2009 17	Gabala	0 - 1	Inter Baku	Gabala City Stadium
14:00 AZT (UTC+4)		Summary	Zlatinov 87'	Attendance: 800; Referee: Afgan Hamzayev

3 February 2010 18	Inter Baku	1 - 0	Mughan	Shafa Stadium
16:00 AZT (UTC+4)	Zlatinov 70'	Summary		Attendance: 500; Referee: Rahim Hasanov

9 February 2010 19	Standard	0 - 1	Inter Baku	Shafa Stadium
18:00 AZT (UTC+4)		Summary	Paknys (yellow card) 50' (yellow-red card) 61'; Odikadze 72'	Referee: Anar Salmanov

13 February 2010 20	Inter Baku	2 - 1	Simurq	Shafa Stadium
18:00 AZT (UTC+4)	Poškus 25'; Navalovski 45'	Summary	Hunchak 54' (pen.)	Attendance: 800; Referee: Hacieli Ağayev

17 February 2010 21	Qarabağ	1 - 1	Inter Baku	Baku^{2}
14:15 AZT (UTC+4)	Karimov 22'	Summary	Poškus 60'	Stadium: Tofiq Bahramov Stadium; Attendance: 2,000; Referee: Vusal Aliyev

21 February 2010 22	Inter Baku	1 - 0	Neftchi Baku	Shafa Stadium
14:00 AZT (UTC+4)	Karlsons 87'	Summary		Attendance: 2,500; Referee: Elchin Mämmädov

==== League table ====
Pos	Team	Pld	W	D	L	GF	GA	GD	Pts	Qualification
1	Inter Baku	22	15	4	3	36	18	+18	49	Qualification for championship group
2	Khazar Lankaran	22	12	8	2	29	11	+18	44	Qualification for championship group
3	Qarabağ	22	11	9	2	21	12	+9	42	Qualification for championship group
4	Baku	22	10	7	5	22	17	+5	37	Qualification for championship group
5	Gabala	22	10	6	6	24	21	+3	36	Qualification for championship group

Source: Soccerway.com
Rules for classification: 1) points; 2) goal difference; 3) number of goals scored.

=== Azerbaijan Premier League Championship Group ===
==== Results ====
13 March 2010 23	Inter Baku	1 - 1	Neftchi Baku	Shafa Stadium
16:00 AZT (UTC+4)	Červenka 45'	Summary	Neaga 77' (pen.)	Attendance: 2,500; Referee: Afgan Hamzayev

21 March 2010 24	Inter Baku	1 - 0	Khazar Lankaran	Shafa Stadium
16:10 AZT (UTC+4)	Zlatinov 4' (pen.)	Summary		Attendance: 3,500; Referee: Fariz Yusifov

27 March 2010 25	Qarabağ	1 - 1	Inter Baku	Baku^{2}
16:00 AZT (UTC+4)	Kerimov 86'	Summary	Abbasov 44'	Stadium: Tofiq Bahramov Stadium; Attendance: 2,000; Referee: Elchin Mämmädov

4 April 2010 26	Inter Baku	1 - 1	Baku	Shafa Stadium
16:00 AZST (UTC+5)	Yunisoğlu 17' (o.g.)	Summary	Jabá 1'	Attendance: 2,000; Referee: Fariz Yusifov

10 April 2010 27	Gabala	1 - 1	Inter Baku	Gabala City Stadium
16:00 AZST (UTC+5)	Kerimov 90' (pen.)	Summary	Poškus 61' (pen.)	Attendance: 1,500; Referee: Anar Salmanov

18 April 2010 28	Neftchi Baku	1 - 0	Inter Baku	Tofik Bakhramov Stadium
16:00 AZST (UTC+5)	Huseynov 10'	Summary		Attendance: 2,000; Referee: Fariz Yusifov

23 April 2010 29	Khazar Lankaran	2 - 2	Inter Baku	Lankaran City Stadium
18:00 AZST (UTC+5)	Tsvetkov 44' (pen.); Opara 88'	Summary	Červenka 15'; Poškus 51'	Attendance: 12,000; Referee: Anar Salmanov

1 May 2010 30	Inter Baku	0 - 1	Qarabağ	Shafa Stadium
18:00 AZST (UTC+5)		Summary	Adamia 81'	Attendance: 1,000; Referee: Elchin Mämmädov

9 May 2010 31	Baku	0 - 0	Inter Baku	Tofig Bakhramov Stadium
17:15 AZST (UTC+5)		Summary		Attendance: 1,500; Referee: Fariz Yusifov

15 May 2010 32	Inter Baku	4 - 1	Gabala	Shafa Stadium
17:15 AZST (UTC+5)	Zlatinov 16'; Poškus 40', 47', 67'	Summary	Stolpa 90+1'	Attendance: 1,500; Referee: Elchin Mämmädov

==== Table ====
Pos	Team	Pld	W	D	L	GF	GA	GD	Pts	Qualification
1	Inter Baku (C)	20	7	8	5	22	19	+3	29	Qualification for Champions League second qualifying round
2	Baku	20	7	7	6	19	15	+4	28	Qualification for Europa League second qualifying round (Note: Baku were the winners of the 2009–10 Azerbaijan Cup competition and qualified for the second qualifying round of the UEFA Europa League.)
3	Qarabağ	20	6	9	5	16	18	−2	27 (Note: QAR: 7 pts, 4–3; KHA: 4 pts, 3–4)	Qualification for Europa League first qualifying round
4	Khazar Lankaran	20	6	9	5	19	14	+5	27	Qualification for Europa League first qualifying round
5	Neftçi Baku	20	4	11	5	11	12	−1	23	

Source: Soccerway.com
Rules for classification: 1) points; 2) head-to-head points; 3) head-to-head goal difference; 4) head-to-head goals scored; 5) goal difference; 6) number of goals scored.
(C) Champions

=== Azerbaijan Cup ===
4 November 2009 Round of 16 1st Leg	Inter Baku	4 - 0	Karvan	Shafa Stadium
AZST (UTC+5)	Pereira 14' (o.g.); Rocha 42'; Červenka 77', 89'	Summary	(red card) 87'

11 November 2009 Round of 16 2nd Leg	Karvan	2 - 3 (2 - 7 agg.)	Inter Baku	Yevlakh Stadium
AZST (UTC+5)	Mogaadi 16' (pen.); Bamba 52' (pen.)	Summary	Pereira 6' (o.g.); Ledenev 10', 28'

7 March 2010 Quarter-Finals 1st Leg	Neftchi Baku	0 - 3	Inter Baku	Tofik Bakhramov Stadium
14:00 AZT (UTC+4)		Summary	Poškus 49', 88'; Odikadze 72'	Attendance: 1,000; Referee: Vusal Aliyev

17 March 2010 Quarter-Finals 2nd Leg	Inter Baku	2 - 1 (5 - 1 agg.)	Neftchi Baku	Shafa Stadium
16:00 AZT (UTC+4)	Mammadov 27'; Karlsons 54'	Summary	Aliuță 83' (pen.)	Attendance: 1,000; Referee: Elnur Muradov

27 April 2010 Semi-Final 1st Leg	Baku	0 - 1	Inter Baku	Tofig Bakhramov Stadium
18:00 AZST (UTC+5)		Summary	Mammadov 61'	Attendance: 300; Referee: Vusal Aliyev

5 May 2010 Semi-Final 2nd Leg	Inter Baku	1 - 3 (2 - 3 agg.)	Baku	Shafa Stadium
AZST (UTC+5)	Gutiérrez 51'	Summary	Sofroni 27'; Jabá 56'; Zagorac 66' (o.g.); Boret (yellow card) 59' (yellow-red card) 72'	Attendance: 3,500; Referee: Afgan Hamzayev

=== UEFA Europa League ===
==== First qualifying round ====
2 July 2009 First qualifying round 1st Leg	Spartak Trnava (Slovakia)	2 – 1	(Azerbaijan) Inter Baku	Trnava
23:00 AZST (UTC+5)	Kožuch 20', 26'	Report	Gutiérrez 80'	Stadium: Štadión Antona Malatinského; Attendance: 3,948; Referee: Victor Shvetsov (Ukraine)

9 July 2009 First qualifying round 2nd Leg	Inter Baku (Azerbaijan)	1 – 3 (2 – 5 agg.)	(Slovakia) Spartak Trnava	Baku
20:00 AZST (UTC+5)	Guglielmone 11'	Report	Sukennik 34'; Kožuch 40'; Procházka 48'; Hanzel (yellow card) 42' (red card) 59'	Stadium: Tofik Bakhramov Stadium^{1} Attendance: 4,753; Referee: Ante Vucemilovic-simunovic, Jr. (Croatia)

Notes

- Note 1: Played in Baku at Tofik Bakhramov Stadium as Inter Baku's Shafa Stadium did not meet UEFA criteria.

== Squad statistics ==
=== Appearances and goals ===
No.	Pos	Nat	Player	Total		Premier League		Azerbaijan Cup		UEFA Europa League	
No.	Pos	Nat	Player	Apps	Goals	Apps	Goals	Apps	Goals	Apps	Goals
1	GK	(Brazil) BRA	Wilson Júnior	14	0	12+0	0	0+0	0	2+0	0
4	DF	(Brazil) BRA	Accioly	26	0	24+0	0	0+0	0	2+0	0
5	DF	(Serbia) SRB	Milan Zagorac	4	0	2+1	0	0+0	0	0+1	0
7	FW	(Uruguay) URU	Ángel Gutiérrez	19	2	7+10	1	0+0	0	2+0	1
9	DF	(Azerbaijan) AZE	Samir Abbasov	28	3	23+3	3	0+0	0	2+0	0
11	MF	(Azerbaijan) AZE	Asif Mammadov	18	0	6+10	0	0+0	0	0+2	0
12	DF	(Azerbaijan) AZE	Khayal Mustafayev	7	0	6+1	0	0+0	0	0+0	0
13	MF	(Czech Republic) CZE	Bronislav Červenka	33	3	21+10	3	0+0	0	2+0	0
14	MF	(Bulgaria) BUL	Petar Zlatinov	30	6	16+12	6	0+0	0	2+0	0
15	DF	(Azerbaijan) AZE	Volodimir Levin	29	1	28+1	1	0+0	0	0+0	0
24	MF	(Latvia) LAT	Andrejs Rubins	32	3	27+3	3	0+0	0	1+1	0
34	MF	(Azerbaijan) AZE	Aleksandr Chertoganov	27	0	21+4	0	0+0	0	2+0	0
42	GK	(Georgia (country)) GEO	Giorgi Lomaia	23	0	20+1	0	0+0	0	2+0	0
	DF	(Brazil) BRA	Filipe Machado	2	0	0+2	0	0+0	0	0+0	0
	DF	(Georgia (country)) GEO	Kakhaber Mzhavanadze	18	0	18+0	0	0+0	0	0+0	0
	DF	(Georgia (country)) GEO	Giorgi Navalovski	13	1	13+0	1	0+0	0	0+0	0
	DF	(Lithuania) LTU	Paulius Paknys	6	0	6+0	0	0+0	0	0+0	0
	DF	(Slovakia) SVK	Lubomír Kubica	19	0	14+5	0	0+0	0	0+0	0
	MF	(Azerbaijan) AZE	Tofig Mikayılov	1	0	0+1	0	0+0	0	0+0	0
	MF	(Georgia (country)) GEO	David Odikadze	25	2	17+8	2	0+0	0	0+0	0
	MF	(Serbia) SRB	Goran Arnaut	2	0	1+1	0	0+0	0	0+0	0
	FW	(Azerbaijan) AZE	Elnur Abdulov	1	0	0+1	0	0+0	0	0+0	0
	FW	(Brazil) BRA	Leonardo Rocha	21	5	19+2	5	0+0	0	0+0	0
	FW	(Latvia) LAT	Ģirts Karlsons	19	8	12+7	8	0+0	0	0+0	0
	FW	(Lithuania) LTU	Robertas Poškus	23	12	21+2	12	0+0	0	0+0	0
Players who left Baku on loan during the season:
	DF	(Azerbaijan) AZE	Shahriyar Rahimov	1	0	0+1	0	0+0	0	0+0	0
8	MF	(Azerbaijan) AZE	Rovshan Amiraslanov	2	0	0+2	0	0+0	0	0+0	0
Players who appeared for Baku who left during the season:
6	MF	(Russia) RUS	Aliyar Ismailov	4	0	0+2	0	0+0	0	2+0	0
10	FW	(Azerbaijan) AZE	Khagani Mammadov	2	0	0+0	0	0+0	0	0+2	0
20	DF	(Azerbaijan) AZE	Mahir Shukurov	17	0	15+0	0	0+0	0	2+0	0
22	FW	(Uruguay) URU	Walter Guglielmone	1	1	0+0	0	0+0	0	1+0	1
25	FW	(Azerbaijan) AZE	Javid Huseynov	6	0	3+1	0	0+0	0	2+0	0

=== Goal scorers ===
Place	Position	Nation	Number	Name	Premier League	Azerbaijan Cup	UEFA Europa League	Total
1	FW	(Lithuania)		Robertas Poškus	12	2	0	14
2	FW	(Latvia)		Ģirts Karlsons	8	1	0	9
3	MF	(Bulgaria)	14	Petar Zlatinov	6	0	0	6
3	FW	(Brazil)		Leonardo Rocha	5	1	0	6
5	MF	(Czech Republic)	13	Bronislav Červenka	3	2	0	5
6	MF	(Latvia)	24	Andrejs Rubins	3	0	0	3
6	DF	(Azerbaijan)	9	Samir Abbasov	3	0	0	3
6	MF	(Georgia (country))		David Odikadze	2	1	0	3
6				Own goal	1	2	0	3
6	FW	(Uruguay)	7	Angel Gutiérrez	1	1	1	3
11		(Belarus)		Ledenev	0	2	0	2
11	MF	(Azerbaijan)	11	Asif Mammadov	0	2	0	2
13	DF	(Georgia (country))		Giorgi Navalovski	1	0	0	1
13	DF	(Azerbaijan)	15	Volodimir Levin	1	0	0	1
13	FW	(Uruguay)	22	Walter Guglielmone	0	0	1	1
				TOTALS	47	14	2	63

=== Disciplinary record ===
Number	Nation	Position	Name	Premier League		Azerbaijan Cup		UEFA Europa League		Total	
Number	Nation	Position	Name	Yellow card	Red card	Yellow card	Red card	Yellow card	Red card	Yellow card	Red card
20	(Azerbaijan)	DF	Mahir Shukurov	0	0	0	0	1	0	1	0
			TOTALS	0	0	0	0	1	0	1	0
