= 2008–09 FC Inter Baku season =

Inter Baku
2008–09 season
- President: Jahangir Hajiyev
- Manager: Valentin Khodukin
- Stadium: Shafa Stadium
- Premier League: 2nd
- Azerbaijan Cup: Runners up vs Qarabag
- UEFA Champions League: Second qualifying round vs Partizan
- Top goalscorer: League: Walter Guglielmone (17); All: Walter Guglielmone (20)
Home colours	Away colours

The Inter Baku 2008–09 season was Inter Baku's eighth Azerbaijan Premier League season, and their third season under manager Valentin Khodukin. They finished 2nd in the league one point behind champions Baku.

== Squad ==
Note: Flags indicate national team as defined under FIFA eligibility rules; some limited exceptions apply. Players may hold more than one non-FIFA nationality.

No.	Pos.	Nation	Player
1	GK	BRA	Wilson Junior
2	DF	AZE	Shahriyar Rahimov
3	MF	AZE	Ruhid Yusubov
4	DF	BRA	Accioly
5	DF	SRB	Milan Zagorac
6	DF	RUS	Aliyar Ismailov
9	DF	AZE	Samir Abbasov
10	FW	AZE	Khagani Mammadov
11	MF	AZE	Asif Mammadov
12	DF	AZE	Khayal Mustafayev
13	MF	CZE	Bronislav Červenka
14	MF	BUL	Petar Zlatinov
15	DF	AZE	Vladimir Levin
16	MF	SRB	Marko Petrovic
17	MF	AZE	Elvin Mammadov

No.	Pos.	Nation	Player
18	MF	SLO	Goran Arnaut
20	MF	BRA	Cleiton
21	MF	MDA	Ion Testemitanu
22	FW	URU	Walter Guglielmone
23	MF	MDA	Oleg Shishkin
24	MF	LAT	Andrejs Rubins
25	MF	AZE	Javid Huseynov
30	MF	LAT	Vladimirs Koļesņičenko
34	MF	BRA	Adriano Gabiru
72	GK	AZE	Fuad Akhmedov
42	GK	AZE	Elkhan Hasanov
88	GK	BUL	Svilen Simeonov
--	MF	BRA	Velton Carlos Silva
—	FW	AZE	Nevruz Keklikov

== Transfers ==
=== Summer ===
In: Note: Flags indicate national team as defined under FIFA eligibility rules; some limited exceptions apply. Players may hold more than one non-FIFA nationality.

No.	Pos.	Nation	Player
1	GK	BRA	Wilson Junior (from (Portugal) Naval)
4	DF	BRA	Accioly (from (Portugal) Santa Clara)
8	MF	BLR	Valyantsin Byalkevich (from (Ukraine) Dynamo Kyiv)
11	MF	AZE	Asif Mammadov (from (Azerbaijan) Standard Baku)
16	DF	SRB	Marko Petrovic (from (Belgium) Hamme)
20	MF	BRA	Cleiton (loan from (Brazil) ASA)
23	MF	MDA	Oleg Shishkin (from (Russia) Avangard Kursk)
24	MF	LAT	Andrejs Rubins (from (Russia) Spartak Moscow, previously on loan to (Latvia) Liepājas Metalurgs)
25	MF	AZE	Javid Huseynov (from (Azerbaijan) Olimpik Baku)
26	MF	LTU	Tadas Labukas (loan from (Romania) Oțelul Galați)
34	MF	BRA	Adriano Gabiru (loan from (Brazil) Internacional)
—	MF	BRA	Velton Carlos Silva
—	FW	AZE	Nevruz Keklikov (from 11 Sosyalist A)

Out: Note: Flags indicate national team as defined under FIFA eligibility rules; some limited exceptions apply. Players may hold more than one non-FIFA nationality.

No.	Pos.	Nation	Player
1	GK	AZE	Jahangir Hasanzade (to (Azerbaijan) Gabala)
4	DF	SRB	Nikola Jolović (to (Serbia) Čukarički Stankom)
7	MF	AZE	Mahmud Qurbanov (to (Azerbaijan) Baku)
10	MF	AZE	Emin Imamaliev (to (Azerbaijan) Qarabağ)
23	FW	BUL	Georgi Vladimirov
—	DF	AZE	Mahir Shukurov (to (Azerbaijan) Khazar Lankaran)
—	DF	AZE	Nizami Hajiyev (to (Azerbaijan) Olimpik Baku)
—	FW	URU	Román Cuello

=== Winter ===
In: Note: Flags indicate national team as defined under FIFA eligibility rules; some limited exceptions apply. Players may hold more than one non-FIFA nationality.

No.	Pos.	Nation	Player
21	DF	MDA	Ion Testimitanu (from (Moldova) Sheriff Tiraspol)
28	FW	BOL	Augusto Andaveris (loan from (Bolivia) La Paz)
30	MF	LAT	Vladimirs Koļesņičenko (from (Latvia) Ventspils)

Out: Note: Flags indicate national team as defined under FIFA eligibility rules; some limited exceptions apply. Players may hold more than one non-FIFA nationality.

No.	Pos.	Nation	Player
26	MF	LTU	Tadas Labukas (loan return to (Romania) Oțelul Galați)

== Competitions ==
=== Azerbaijan Premier League ===
==== Results summary ====
Overall								Home						Away					
Pld	W	D	L	GF	GA	GD	Pts	W	D	L	GF	GA	GD	W	D	L	GF	GA	GD
26	18	7	1	54	16	+38	61	8	4	1	27	8	+19	10	3	0	27	8	+19

Last updated: 22 May 2013.
Source: Soccerway

==== Results ====
10 August 2008 1	Olimpik Baku	1 – 1	Inter Baku	Baku
19:00 AZST (UTC+5)	Gomes 86'	Summary	E.Mammadov 24'	Stadium: Shafa Stadium

16 August 2008 2	Inter Baku	3 – 0	Standard Baku	Baku
19:00 AZST (UTC+5)	Guglielmone 18'; Huseynov 68'; K.Mammadov 87'	Summary		Stadium: Shafa Stadium

24 August 2008 3	Baku	0 – 0	Inter Baku	Baku
21:00 AZST (UTC+5)		Summary		Stadium: Tofig Bakhramov Stadium

30 August 2008 4	Inter Baku	1 – 1	Gabala	Baku
19:00 AZST (UTC+5)	Guglielmone 84'	Summary	Tiago 23'	Stadium: Shafa Stadium

21 September 2008 5	Simurq	0 – 2	Inter Baku	Zaqatala
16:30 AZST (UTC+5)		Summary	Guglielmone 65'; K.Mammadov 90'	Stadium: Zaqatala City Stadium

28 September 2008 6	Inter Baku	3 – 0	Turan Tovuz	Baku
19:00 AZST (UTC+5)	Červenka 18'; Andaveris 50'; Guglielmone 52'	Summary		Stadium: Shafa Stadium

4 October 2008 7	NBC Salyan^{1}	1 – 2	Inter Baku	Salyan
16:00 AZST (UTC+5)	Zeynalov 79' (pen.)	Summary	Andaveris 63'; Rubins 70'	Stadium: Salyan Olympic Sport Complex Stadium

19 October 2008 8	Inter Baku	2 – 0	MOIK Baku	Baku
19:00 AZST (UTC+5)	Zlatinov 6'; Testemitanu 13'	Summary		Stadium: Shafa Stadium

25 October 2008 9	Neftchi Baku	1 – 3	Inter Baku	Baku
14:15 AZST (UTC+5)	Dafchev 83' (pen.)	Summary	Guglielmone 25' (pen.); Accioly 44'; Rubins 63'	Stadium: Tofig Bakhramov Stadium

9 November 2008 10	Khazar Lankaran	2 – 4	Inter Baku	Lankaran
18:00 AZT (UTC+4)	Denis 47'; Rômulo 81'	Summary	Rubins 7'; Andaveris 49'; Zlatinov 62'; Abbasov 90'	Stadium: Lankaran City Stadium

15 November 2008 11	Inter Baku	1 – 1	Karabakh	Baku
16:00 AZT (UTC+4)	Andaveris 14'	Summary	Javadov 24'	Stadium: Shafa Stadium

22 November 2008 12	Karvan	1 – 2	Inter Baku	Yevlakh
14:00 AZT (UTC+4)	Emo 75'	Summary	Rubins 15'; Guglielmone 51'	Stadium: Yevlakh Stadium

30 November 2008 13	Inter Baku	4 – 0	Bakili Baku	Baku
15:00 AZT (UTC+4)	Andaveris 4'; Ismailov 36'; Guglielmone 41'; E.Mammadov 58'	Summary		Stadium: Shafa Stadium

15 February 2009 14	Inter Baku	1 – 0	Olimpik Baku	Baku
18:00 AZT (UTC+4)	Accioly 62'	Summary		Stadium: Shafa Stadium

22 February 2009 15	Standard Baku	0 – 2	Inter Baku	Baku
16:00 AZT (UTC+4)		Summary	E.Mammadov 30'; Guglielmone 66'	Stadium: Shafa Stadium

28 February 2009 16	Inter Baku	0 – 1	Baku	Baku
15:00 AZT (UTC+4)		Summary	Pérez 22'	Stadium: Shafa Stadium

7 March 2009 17	Gabala	0 – 1	Inter Baku	Qabala
15:00 AZT (UTC+4)		Summary	Guglielmone 32'	Stadium: Gabala City Stadium

14 March 2009 18	Inter Baku	2 – 1	Simurq	Baku
15:00 AZT (UTC+4)	E.Mammadov 21'; Adriano Gabiru 71'	Summary	Sayadov 62'	Stadium: Shafa Stadium

21 March 2009 19	Turan Tovuz	0 – 1	Inter Baku	Tovuz
15:00 AZT (UTC+4)		Summary	Accioly 73'	Stadium: Tovuz City Stadium

4 April 2009 20	Inter Baku	2 – 0	Mughan^{1}	Baku
16:00 AZST (UTC+5)	K.Mammadov 17'; Rubins 69'	Summary		Stadium: Shafa Stadium

12 April 2009 21	MOIK Baku	0 – 3	Inter Baku	Baku
16:00 AZST (UTC+5)		Summary	Guglielmone 36', 74', 89'	Stadium: Shafa Stadium

19 April 2009 22	Inter Baku	2 – 2	Neftchi Baku	Baku
16:00 AZST (UTC+5)	Guglielmone 52', 55'	Summary	Petrov 24'; Olefir 44'	Stadium: Shafa Stadium

25 April 2009 23	Inter Baku	2 – 2	Khazar Lankaran	Baku
16:00 AZST (UTC+5)	Levin 33'; Koļesņičenko 45'	Summary	Dzhambazov 75'; Dursun 77'	Stadium: Shafa Stadium

3 May 2009 24	Karabakh	1 – 1	Inter Baku	Baku^{2}
16:00 AZST (UTC+5)	Şaini 35'	Summary	Rubins 59'	Stadium: Tofiq Bahramov Stadium

9 May 2009 25	Inter Baku	4 – 0	Karvan	Baku
18:00 AZST (UTC+5)	Petrovic 9'; Huseynov 67'; Guglielmone 69', 75'	Summary		Stadium: Shafa Stadium

17 May 2009 26	Bakili Baku	1 – 5	Inter Baku	Baku
18:00 AZST (UTC+5)	Aliyev 52'	Summary	Guglielmone 39'; A.Mammadov 46'; Yusubov 56', 87'; Červenka 64'	Stadium: Shafa Stadium

==== Table ====
Pos	Team	Pld	W	D	L	GF	GA	GD	Pts	Qualification or relegation
1	Baku (C)	26	20	2	4	54	13	+41	62	Qualification for Champions League second qualifying round
2	Inter Baku	26	18	7	1	54	16	+38	61	Qualification for Europa League first qualifying round
3	Simurq	26	16	5	5	39	20	+19	53	Qualification for Europa League first qualifying round
4	Khazar Lankaran	26	15	5	6	49	21	+28	50	
5	Qarabağ	26	14	7	5	35	22	+13	49	Qualification for Europa League second qualifying round (Note: Karabakh won the 2008–09 Azerbaijan Cup and therefore qualified for the second qualifying round of the UEFA Europa League.)

Source: Soccerway.com
Rules for classification: 1) points; 2) goal difference; 3) number of goals scored.
(C) Champions

=== Azerbaijan Cup ===
29 October 2008 Round of 16 1st Leg	Inter Baku	2 – 2	Standard Baku	Baku
20:00 AZST (UTC+5)	Andaveris 66'; Accioly 86'	Summary	Sigueira; Gutierrez 48'	Stadium: Shafa Stadium

6 November 2008 Round of 16 2nd Leg	Standard Baku	1 – 2 (3 – 4 agg.)	Inter Baku	Baku
16:00 AZT (UTC+4)	Velton 87' (pen.)	Summary	Zlatinov 39'; Guglielmone 67'; Mustafayev (red card) 86'	Stadium: Shafa Stadium

25 February 2009 Quarterfinals 1st Leg	Inter Baku	2 – 0	Simurq	Baku
15:00 AZT (UTC+4)	Zlatinov 30'; K.Mammadov 83'	Summary		Stadium: Shafa Stadium

11 March 2009 Quarterfinals 2nd Leg	Simurq	2 – 1 (2 – 3 agg.)	Inter Baku	Zaqatala
16:00 AZT (UTC+4)	Mazyar 42', 82'	Summary	K.Mammadov 83'	Stadium: Zaqatala City Stadium

29 April 2009 Semifinals 1st Leg	Inter Baku	5 – 0	Gabala	Baku
	Guglielmone 5', 12' (pen.); Zlatinov 8'; Accioly 61'; Testemitanu 76'	Summary		Stadium: Shafa Stadium

6 May 2009 Semifinals 2nd Leg	Gabala	2 – 0 (2 – 5 agg.)	Inter Baku	Qabala
	Kerimov 41'; Gasimov 89'	Summary		Stadium: Gabala City Stadium

23 May 2009 Final	Karabakh	1 – 0	Inter Baku	Baku
19:00 AZST (UTC+5)	Javadov 57' (pen.)	Summary		Stadium: Tofik Bakhramov Stadium

=== UEFA Champions League ===
==== Qualifying rounds ====
15 July 2008 1st qualifying round 1st leg	Inter Baku (Azerbaijan)	0 – 0	(North Macedonia) Rabotnički	Baku, Azerbaijan
21:00 AZST (UTC+5)		Report		Stadium: Tofik Bakhramov Stadium; Referee: Cyril Zimmermann (Switzerland)

22 July 2008 1st qualifying round 2nd leg	Rabotnički (North Macedonia)	1 – 1 (1 – 1 (a) agg.)	(Azerbaijan) Inter Baku	Skopje, Macedonia
20:00 AZST (UTC+5)	Velkovski 47'; Krsteski (red card) 90+2'	Report	Červenka 77'; Guglielmone (yellow card) 90+2' (yellow-red card) 90+4'	Stadium: Philip II Arena; Referee: Asaf Kenan (Israel)

29 July 2008 2nd qualifying round 1st leg	Inter Baku (Azerbaijan)	1 – 1	(Serbia) Partizan	Baku, Azerbaijan
19:00 AZST (UTC+5)	Zlatinov 84'	Report	Bogunović 4'	Stadium: Tofik Bakhramov Stadium; Referee: Tomasz Mikulski (Poland)

6 August 2008 2nd qualifying round 2nd leg	Partizan (Serbia)	2 – 0 (3 – 1 agg.)	(Azerbaijan) Inter Baku	Belgrade, Serbia
23:45 AZST (UTC+5)	Juca 61'; Diarra 83'	Report		Stadium: Partizan Stadium; Referee: César Muñiz (Spain)

== Squad statistics ==
=== Appearances and goals ===
No.	Pos	Nat	Player	Total		Premier League		Azerbaijan Cup		UEFA Champions League	
No.	Pos	Nat	Player	Apps	Goals	Apps	Goals	Apps	Goals	Apps	Goals
1	GK	(Brazil) BRA	Wilson Júnior	23	0	23	0	0	0	0	0
2	DF	(Azerbaijan) AZE	Shahriyar Rahimov	5	0	3	0	0	0	1+1	0
4	DF	(Brazil) BRA	Accioly	20	3	20	3	0	0	0	0
5	DF	(Serbia) SRB	Milan Zagorac	12	0	10	0	0	0	2	0
6	DF	(Russia) RUS	Aliyar Ismailov	29	1	25	1	0	0	4	0
8	MF	(Belarus) BLR	Valyantsin Byalkevich	6	0	5	0	0	0	1	0
9	DF	(Azerbaijan) AZE	Samir Abbasov	25	1	21	1	0	0	3+1	0
10	FW	(Azerbaijan) AZE	Khagani Mammadov	15	3	12	3	0	0	3	0
11	MF	(Azerbaijan) AZE	Asif Mammadov	5	1	4	1	0	0	0+1	0
12	DF	(Azerbaijan) AZE	Khayal Mustafayev	13	0	13	0	0	0	0	0
13	MF	(Czech Republic) CZE	Bronislav Červenka	26	3	24	2	0	0	2	1
14	MF	(Bulgaria) BUL	Petar Zlatinov	18	3	14	2	0	0	4	1
15	DF	(Azerbaijan) AZE	Vladimir Levin	14	1	10	1	0	0	4	0
16	MF	(Serbia) SRB	Marko Petrovic	15	1	11	1	0	0	4	0
17	MF	(Azerbaijan) AZE	Elvin Mammadov	21	4	18	4	0	0	3	0
18	MF	(Slovenia) SLO	Goran Arnaut	9	0	8	0	0	0	0+1	0
20	MF	(Brazil) BRA	Cleiton	6	0	6	0	0	0	0	0
21	MF	(Moldova) MDA	Ion Testemitanu	14	1	14	1	0	0	0	0
22	FW	(Uruguay) URU	Walter Guglielmone	26	17	24	17	0	0	2	0
23	MF	(Moldova) MDA	Oleg Shishkin	12	0	9	0	0	0	1+2	0
24	MF	(Latvia) LAT	Andrejs Rubins	19	6	19	6	0	0	0	0
25	MF	(Azerbaijan) AZE	Javid Huseynov	17	2	13	2	0	0	0+4	0
28	FW	(Bolivia) BOL	Augusto Andaveris	15	5	15	5	0	0	0	0
88	GK	(Bulgaria) BUL	Svilen Simeonov	7	0	3	0	0	0	4	0
	MF	(Brazil) BRA	Adriano Gabiru	10	1	10	1	0	0	0	0
	MF	(Latvia) LAT	Vladimirs Koļesņičenko	9	1	9	1	0	0	0	0
	MF	(Azerbaijan) AZE	Ruhid Yusubov	2	2	2	2	0	0	0	0
Players who left Baku on loan during the season:
Players who appeared for Baku who left during the season:
7	MF	(Azerbaijan) AZE	Makhmud Gurbanov	8	0	4	0	0	0	4	0
10	MF	(Azerbaijan) AZE	Emin Imamaliev	3	0	0	0	0	0	2+1	0
26	MF	(Lithuania) LTU	Tadas Labukas	7	0	7	0	0	0	0	0
	MF	(Brazil) BRA	Velton Carlos Silva	3	0	3	0	0	0	0	0

=== Goal scorers ===
Place	Position	Nation	Number	Name	Premier League	Azerbaijan Cup	UEFA Champions League	Total
1	FW	(Uruguay)	22	Walter Guglielmone	17	3	0	20
2	MF	(Latvia)	24	Andrejs Rubins	6	0	0	6
2	FW	(Bolivia)	28	Augusto Andaveris	5	1	0	6
2	MF	(Bulgaria)	14	Petar Zlatinov	2	3	1	6
5	DF	(Brazil)	4	Accioly	3	2	0	5
5	FW	(Azerbaijan)	10	Khagani Mammadov	3	2	0	5
7	MF	(Azerbaijan)	17	Elvin Mammadov	4	0	0	4
8	MF	(Czech Republic)	13	Bronislav Červenka	2	0	1	3
9	MF	(Azerbaijan)	25	Javid Huseynov	2	0	0	2
9	MF	(Azerbaijan)		Ruhid Yusubov	2	0	0	2
9	MF	(Moldova)	21	Ion Testemitanu	1	1	0	2
12	DF	(Russia)	5	Aliyar Ismailov	1	0	0	1
12	DF	(Azerbaijan)	9	Samir Abbasov	1	0	0	1
12	MF	(Brazil)		Adriano Gabiru	1	0	0	1
12	MF	(Serbia)	16	Marko Petrovic	1	0	0	1
12	DF	(Azerbaijan)	15	Vladimir Levin	1	0	0	1
12	MF	(Latvia)	30	Vladimirs Koļesņičenko	1	0	0	1
12	MF	(Azerbaijan)	11	Asif Mammadov	1	0	0	1
				TOTALS	54	12	2	68

== Notes ==
- On 31 October 2008, FK NBC Salyan changed their name to FK Mughan.
- Qarabağ have played their home games at the Tofiq Bahramov Stadium since 1993 due to the ongoing situation in Quzanlı.
