= 2010–11 FC Inter Baku season =

Inter Baku
2010–11 season
- President: (Azerbaijan) Jahangir Hajiyev
- Manager: (Georgia (country)) Kakhaber Tskhadadze
- Stadium: Shafa Stadium
- Premier League: 5th
- Azerbaijan Cup: Runners up vs Khazar Lankaran
- UEFA Champions League: Second Qualifying Round vs Lech Poznań
- CIS Cup: Winners
- Top goalscorer: League: Robertas Poškus (5); All: Robertas Poškus (6)
- Highest home attendance: 5,000 vs Khazar Lankaran; 30 April 2011
- Lowest home attendance: 300 vs Simurq; 13 February 2011
- Average home league attendance: 1,286
Home colours	Away colours

The Inter Baku 2010–11 season was Inter Baku's tenth Azerbaijan Premier League season, and their second season under manager Kakhaber Tskhadadze. Inter Baku were reigning champions of the Azerbaijan Premier League, but failed to defend their title finishing 5th and missing out on European qualification. Inter also participated in the Azerbaijan Cup, where they lost in the Final to Khazar Lankaran on penalties, and the UEFA Champions League where they were knocked out on penalties in the Second Qualifying Round by Lech Poznań of Poland.

== Squad ==
As of match played 24 May 2011

No.	Name	Nationality	Position	Date of birth (age)	Signed from	Signed in	Contract ends	Apps.	Goals
Goalkeepers
1	Giorgi Lomaia	(Georgia (country))	GK	8 August 1979 (aged 31)	Locomotive Tbilisi	2009			
72	Dmitry Kramarenko	(Azerbaijan)	GK	12 September 1974 (aged 36)	Khazar Lankaran	2010		11	0
Defenders
4	Danildo Accioly	(Brazil)	DF	30 March 1981 (aged 30)	Santa Clara	2008			
5	Dmitri Kruglov	(Estonia)	DF	24 May 1984 (aged 27)	Neftçi Baku	2010		39	2
15	Volodimir Levin captain	(Azerbaijan)	DF	23 January 1984 (aged 27)	Chornomorets-2 Odesa	2004			
18	Ilia Kandelaki	(Georgia (country))	DF	26 December 1981 (aged 29)	Sturm Graz	2010			
21	Arif Dashdemirov	(Azerbaijan)	DF	10 February 1987 (aged 24)	Gabala	2010		35	1
23	Shahriyar Rahimov	(Azerbaijan)	DF	6 April 1989 (aged 22)	Youth Team	2007			
44	Valeri Abramidze	(Georgia (country))	DF	17 January 1980 (aged 31)	Neftçi Baku	2010		25	0
88	Kakhaber Mzhavanadze	(Georgia (country))	DF	2 October 1978 (aged 32)	Dacia Chișinău	2009			
Midfielders
8	Aleksandr Chertoganov	(Azerbaijan)	MF	8 February 1980 (aged 31)	Neftçi Baku	2009			
11	Asif Mammadov	(Azerbaijan)	MF	5 August 1986 (aged 24)	Khazar Lankaran	2011			
12	Filip Despotovski	(North Macedonia)	MF	18 November 1982 (aged 28)	Vorskla Poltava	2010		16	1
13	Bronislav Červenka	(Czech Republic)	MF	27 September 1975 (aged 35)	Vorskla Poltava	2007			
14	Petar Zlatinov	(Bulgaria)	MF	13 March 1981 (aged 30)	Litex Lovech	2008			
19	David Odikadze	(Georgia (country))	MF	14 April 1981 (aged 30)	Győri ETO	2009			
77	Daniel Genov	(Bulgaria)	MF	19 May 1989 (aged 22)	Kom Berkovitsa	2010		8	0
Forwards
9	Rovshan Amiraslanov	(Azerbaijan)	FW	18 March 1986 (aged 25)	Youth Team	2009			
16	Elnur Abdulov	(Azerbaijan)	FW	18 September 1992 (aged 18)	Youth Team	2009			
20	Ģirts Karlsons	(Latvia)	FW	7 June 1981 (aged 29)	Liepājas Metalurgs	2009			
28	Bachana Tskhadadze	(Georgia (country))	FW	23 October 1987 (aged 23)	Spartak Tskhinvali	2010		2	0
32	Robertas Poškus	(Lithuania)	FW	5 May 1979 (aged 32)	Ural Yekaterinburg	2009			
Also under contract
	Asif Mirili	(Azerbaijan)	MF	10 December 1991 (aged 19)	Youth Team	2010		1	0
Away on loan
5	Zhivko Zhelev	(Bulgaria)	DF	23 July 1979 (aged 31)	Steaua București	2010		2	0
7	Nizami Hajiyev	(Azerbaijan)	MF	8 February 1988 (aged 23)	Khazar Lankaran	2010			
10	Jamal Mammadov	(Azerbaijan)	MF	26 December 1983 (aged 27)	Simurq	2009			
35	Mário Sérgio	(Brazil)	MF	30 January 1977 (aged 34)	Khazar Lankaran	2010		10	3
Left during the season
8	Filipe Machado	(Brazil)	MF	13 March 1984 (aged 27)	Salernitana	2010		11	0

== Transfers ==
=== Summer ===
In: Note: Flags indicate national team as defined under FIFA eligibility rules; some limited exceptions apply. Players may hold more than one non-FIFA nationality.

No.	Pos.	Nation	Player
5	DF	BUL	Zhivko Zhelev (From (Romania) Steaua București)
6	DF	EST	Dmitri Kruglov (From (Azerbaijan) Neftchi Baku)
12	MF	MKD	Filip Despotovski (From (Ukraine) Vorskla Poltava)
18	DF	GEO	Ilia Kandelaki (From (Austria) Sturm Graz)
21	DF	AZE	Arif Dashdemirov (From (Azerbaijan) Gabala)
35	MF	BRA	Mario Sergio (From (Azerbaijan) Khazar Lankaran)
44	DF	GEO	Valeri Abramidze (From (Azerbaijan) Neftchi Baku)
72	GK	AZE	Dmitriy Kramarenko (From (Azerbaijan) Khazar Lankaran)

Out: Note: Flags indicate national team as defined under FIFA eligibility rules; some limited exceptions apply. Players may hold more than one non-FIFA nationality.

No.	Pos.	Nation	Player
5	DF	SRB	Milan Zagorac (to (Serbia) FK Zemun)
5	DF	BUL	Zhivko Zhelev (loan to (Azerbaijan) Simurq)
6	MF	AZE	Aliyar Ismailov (to (Russia) Biolog-Novokubansk Progress)
7	FW	URU	Ángel Gutiérrez (to (Azerbaijan) Mughan)
7	MF	AZE	Nizami Hajiyev (loan to (Azerbaijan) MOIK Baku)
9	DF	AZE	Samir Abbasov (to (Azerbaijan) Qarabağ)
10	MF	AZE	Jamal Mammadov (loan to (Azerbaijan) Simurq)
10	MF	BRA	Sérgio Oliveira (to (Malta) Tarxien Rainbows)
11	FW	AZE	Asif Mammadov (to (Azerbaijan) Khazar Lankaran)
18	MF	SRB	Goran Arnaut (to (Hungary) Vasas)
24	MF	LAT	Andrejs Rubins (to (Azerbaijan) Qarabağ)
—	FW	BRA	Leo Rocha (to (Venezuela) Deportivo Lara)

=== Winter ===
In: Note: Flags indicate national team as defined under FIFA eligibility rules; some limited exceptions apply. Players may hold more than one non-FIFA nationality.

No.	Pos.	Nation	Player
11	FW	AZE	Asif Mammadov (From (Azerbaijan) Khazar Lankaran)
28	FW	GEO	Bachana Tskhadadze (From (Georgia (country)) Spartaki-Tskhinvali Tbilisi)

Out: Note: Flags indicate national team as defined under FIFA eligibility rules; some limited exceptions apply. Players may hold more than one non-FIFA nationality.

No.	Pos.	Nation	Player
10	MF	AZE	Jamal Mammadov (to (Azerbaijan) Simurq)
35	MF	BRA	Mario Sergio (loan to (Azerbaijan) Simurq)
84	DF	BRA	Filipe Machado (to (United Arab Emirates) Al Dhafra Club)

== Competitions ==
=== Azerbaijan Premier League ===
==== First round ====
===== Results =====
8 August 2010 1	Turan Tovuz	0–3	Inter Baku	Tovuz City Stadium
18:00 AZST (UTC+5)		Summary	Poškus 3'; Mario Sergio 7'; Kruglov 17'	Attendance: 2,000; Referee: Elnur Muradov

15 August 2010 2	Inter Baku	1–0	MOIK Baku	Shafa Stadium
20:00 AZST (UTC+5)	Mario Sergio 89' (pen.)	Summary		Attendance: 500; Referee: Rauf Jabbarov

21 August 2010 3	Khazar Lankaran	0–0	Inter Baku	Lankaran City Stadium
20:00 AZST (UTC+5)		Summary		Attendance: 13,500; Referee: Fariz Yusifov

28 August 2010 4	Inter Baku	0–2	Neftchi Baku	Shafa Stadium
20:00 AZST (UTC+5)		Summary	Nasimov 33'; Flavinho 50' (pen.)	Attendance: 2,000; Referee: Anar Salmanov

11 September 2010 5	Inter Baku	1–0	Qarabağ	Shafa Stadium
19:00 AZST (UTC+5)	Chertoganov 12'	Summary		Attendance: 1,200; Referee: Vusal Aliyev

19 September 2010 6	Gabala	0–1	Inter Baku	Gabala City Stadium
17:00 AZST (UTC+5)		Summary	Amiraslanov 35'	Attendance: 1,200; Referee: Elnur Muradov

26 September 2010 7	FK Ganja	1–0	Inter Baku	Ganja City Stadium
17:00 AZST (UTC+5)	Zargarov 21'	Summary		Attendance: 5,000; Referee: Rovshan Ahmadov

1 October 2010 8	Inter Baku	1–0	FK Mughan	Shafa Stadium
18:00 AZST (UTC+5)	Karlsons 81' (pen.)	Summary		Attendance: 500; Referee: Elnur Muradov

16 October 2010 9	AZAL	5–0	Inter Baku	Shafa Stadium
16:30 AZST (UTC+5)	Juška 69'; Igbekoi 49', 79'; Kvirtiya 76'; Garaev 82'	Summary		Attendance: 300; Referee: Fariz Yusifov

24 October 2010 10	Inter Baku	1–0	Baku	Shafa Stadium
18:00 AZST (UTC+5)	Accioly 5'	Summary		Attendance: 1,500; Referee: Vusal Aliyev

31 October 2010 11	Simurq	0–1	Inter Baku	Zaqatala City Stadium
14:00 AZT (UTC+4)		[Filip Despotovski Summary]	Despotovski 14'	Attendance: 500; Referee: Ramil Diniyev

6 November 2010 12	Neftchi Baku	1–1	Inter Baku	Tofik Bakhramov Stadium
16:00 AZT (UTC+4)	Mpenza 83'	Summary	Zlatinov 61'	Attendance: 3,000; Referee: Rovshan Ahmadov

13 November 2010 13	Inter Baku	0–0	Gabala	Shafa Stadium
18:00 AZT (UTC+4)		Summary		Attendance: 500; Referee: Elchin Mammadov

20 November 2010 14	Inter Baku	3–0	Turan Tovuz	Shafa Stadium
16:00 AZT (UTC+4)	Odikadze 2'; Mario Sergio 55'; Poškus 88'	Summary		Attendance: 355; Referee: Rauf Jabbarov

28 November 2010 15	FK Mughan	1–0	Inter Baku	Salyany Olympic Stadium
13:00 AZT (UTC+4)	Gutiérrez 77'	Summary		Attendance: 1,000; Referee: Afgan Hamzayev

4 December 2010 16	Qarabağ	1–0	Inter Baku	Guzanli Olympic Stadium
14:00 AZT (UTC+4)	Aliyev 45'	Summary		Attendance: 1,500; Referee: Vusal Aliyev

11 December 2010 17	Inter Baku	1–1	AZAL	Shafa Stadium
16:00 AZT (UTC+4)	Zlatinov 61'	Summary	Juška 70'	Attendance: 2,000; Referee: Fariz Yusifov

18 December 2010 18	Baku	1–2	Inter Baku	Tofik Bakhramov Stadium
16:30 AZT (UTC+4)	Borbiconi 51'; Borets (yellow card) 80' (yellow-red card) 80'	Summary	Borbiconi 73' (o.g.); Červenka 81'	Attendance: 500; Referee: Vusal Aliyev

23 December 2010 19	Inter Baku	1–0	FK Ganja	Shafa Stadium
16:00 AZT (UTC+4)	Poškus 87'	Summary		Attendance: 1,000; Referee: Ramil Diniyev

13 February 2011 20	Inter Baku	2–0	Simurq	Shafa Stadium
16:00 AZT (UTC+4)	Amiraslanov 25'; Accioly 69'	Summary		Attendance: 300; Referee: Rovshan Ahmadov

19 February 2011 21	MOIK Baku	0–4	Inter Baku	MOIK Stadium
16:00 AZT (UTC+4)		Summary	Kruglov 37'; Odikadze 45'; Kandelaki 76'; Levin 79'	Attendance: 500; Referee: Rauf Jabbarov

27 February 2011 22	Inter Baku	1–3	Khazar Lankaran	Shafa Stadium
AZT (UTC+4)	Karlsons 60' (pen.)	Summary	Chiacu 9'; Piţ 19'; Parks 49'	Attendance: 3,000; Referee: Rovshan Ahmadov

===== Table =====
Pos	Team	Pld	W	D	L	GF	GA	GD	Pts	Qualification
2	Khazar Lankaran	22	14	5	3	28	12	+16	47	Qualification for championship group
3	Qarabağ	22	13	3	6	30	14	+16	42	Qualification for championship group
4	Inter Baku	22	12	4	6	24	16	+8	40	Qualification for championship group
5	AZAL	22	9	9	4	27	16	+11	36	Qualification for championship group
6	Baku	22	9	6	7	28	21	+7	33	Qualification for championship group

Source: Soccerway.com
Rules for classification: 1) points; 2) goal difference; 3) number of goals scored.

==== Championship group ====
===== Results =====
12 March 2011 23	Inter Baku	0–2	Qarabağ	Shafa Stadium
16:00 AZT (UTC+4)		Summary	Aliyev 58'; Adamia 74'	Attendance: 1,500; Referee: Fariz Yusifov

18 March 2011 24	Inter Baku	1–1	Baku	Shafa Stadium
16:00 AZT (UTC+4)	Poškus 82'	Summary	Jabá 9'	Attendance: 500; Referee: Elchin Mämmädov

3 April 2011 25	AZAL	1–0	Inter Baku	AZAL Arena
16:00 AZST (UTC+5)	Kvirtiya 45'	Summary		Attendance: 800; Referee: Fariz Yusifov

9 April 2011 26	Inter Baku	1–1	Neftchi Baku	Shafa Stadium
17:00 AZST (UTC+5)	Poškus 2'; Mzhavanadze (yellow card) 17' (yellow-red card) 85'	Summary	Flavinho 86' (pen.)	Attendance: 1,500; Referee: Afgan Hamzayev

16 April 2011 27	Khazar Lankaran	1–1	Inter Baku	Lankaran City Stadium
19:00 AZST (UTC+5)	Parks 18'	Summary	Odikadze 28'	Attendance: 11,000; Referee: Rovshan Ahmadov

24 April 2011 28	Qarabağ	1–0	Inter Baku	Guzanli Olympic Stadium
16:30 AZST (UTC+5)	Adamia 76' (pen.)	Summary		Attendance: 1,500; Referee: Ramil Diniyev

30 April 2011 29	Inter Baku	1–1	Khazar Lankaran	Shafa Stadium
18:00 AZST (UTC+5)	Dashdemirov 26'	Summary	Chiacu 62'	Attendance: 5,000; Referee: Ramil Diniyev

8 May 2011 30	Neftchi Baku	0–0	Inter Baku	Tofik Bakhramov Stadium
15:40 AZST (UTC+5)		Summary		Attendance: 450; Referee: Aliyar Agayev

13 May 2011 31	Inter Baku	0–0	AZAL	Shafa Stadium
19:00 AZST (UTC+5)		Summary		Attendance: 700; Referee: Ramil Diniyev

18 May 2011 32	Baku	0–1	Inter Baku	Tofik Bakhramov Stadium
15:00 AZST (UTC+5)		Summary	Amiraslanov 26'	Attendance: 300; Referee: Aliyar Agayev

===== Table =====
Pos	Team	Pld	W	D	L	GF	GA	GD	Pts	Qualification
1	Neftçi Baku (C)	32	19	10	3	53	17	+36	67	Qualification for Champions League second qualifying round
2	Khazar Lankaran	32	16	12	4	38	18	+20	60	Qualification for Europa League second qualifying round (Note: Khazar Lankaran won the 2010–11 Azerbaijan Cup and therefore qualified for the second qualifying round of the 2011–12 UEFA Europa League.)
3	Qarabağ	32	17	7	8	41	22	+19	58	Qualification for Europa League first qualifying round
4	AZAL	32	13	10	9	36	28	+8	49	Qualification for Europa League first qualifying round
5	Inter Baku	32	13	10	9	29	24	+5	49	
6	Baku	32	10	10	12	33	32	+1	40	

Source: Soccerway.com
Rules for classification: 1) points; 2) goal difference; 3) number of goals scored.
(C) Champions

=== Azerbaijan Cup ===
8 December 2010 Last 16	FK Şuşa	1–4	Inter Baku	Shafa Stadium
AZT (UTC+4)	Mamishov 69'	Summary	Karlsons 15'; Amiraslanov 23', 85'; Poškus 71'	Attendance: 150; Referee: Elvin Askerov

3 March 2011 Quarter Final 1st Leg	FC Absheron	0–1	Inter Baku	Shafa Stadium
14:00 AZT (UTC+4)		Summary	Karlsons 79'	Attendance: 1,000; Referee: Afgan Hamzayev

8 March 2011 Quarter Final 2nd Leg	Inter Baku	0–0 (1–0 agg.)	FC Absheron	Shafa Stadium
16:00 AZT (UTC+4)		Summary	Israfilov (red card) 42'	Attendance: 500; Referee: Rauf Jabbarov

27 April 2011 Semi Final 1st Leg	Inter Baku	0–0	AZAL	Shafa Stadium
18:00 AZST (UTC+5)		Summary		Attendance: 600; Referee: Elchin Mämmädov

4 May 2011 Semi Final 2nd Leg	AZAL	0–1 (0–1 agg.)	Inter Baku	AZAL Stadium
18:00 AZST (UTC+5)		Summary	Odikadze 2'	Attendance: 2,800; Referee: Fariz Yusifov

24 May 2011 Final	Inter Baku	1–1 (a.e.t.) (2–4 p)	Khazar Lankaran	Tofiq Bahramov Stadium, Baku
20:00 AZST (UTC+5)	Karlsons 100'	Summary	Parks 91'	Attendance: 10,000; Referee: Fariz Yusifov

=== UEFA Champions League ===
==== Second qualifying round ====
13 July 2010 1st Leg	Inter Baku (Azerbaijan)	0–1	(Poland) Lech Poznań	Baku^{1}
20:00 AZST (UTC+5)		Report	Wichniarek 47'	Stadium: Tofiq Bahramov Stadium; Attendance: 7,000; Referee: Sascha Kever (Switzerland)

21 July 2010 2nd Leg	Lech Poznań (Poland)	0–1 (a.e.t.) (1–1 agg.) (9–8 p)	(Azerbaijan) Inter Baku	Poznań
23:00 AZST (UTC+5)		Report	Karlsons 84'	Stadium: Stadion Miejski; Attendance: 13,700; Referee: Milorad Mažić (Serbia)
	Penalties
	Bosacki (penalty scored); Krivets (penalty missed); Peszko (penalty missed); Kiełb (penalty scored); Gancarczyk (penalty scored); Wilk (penalty scored); Injac (penalty scored); Wojtkowiak (penalty scored); Arboleda (penalty scored); Štilić (penalty scored); Kotorowski (penalty scored)		Zlatinov (penalty missed); Karlsons (penalty scored); Odikadze (penalty scored); Kruglov (penalty missed); Accioly (penalty scored); Levin (penalty scored); Dashdemirov (penalty scored); Chertoganov (penalty scored); Kandelaki (penalty scored); Červenka (penalty scored); Lomaia (penalty missed)

Notes

- Note 3: Played in Baku at Tofik Bakhramov Stadium as Inter Baku's Shafa Stadium did not meet UEFA criteria.

=== CIS Cup ===
==== Group A ====
Team	Pld	W	D	L	GF	GA	GD	Pts
(Azerbaijan) Inter Baku	3	3	0	0	7	0	+7	9
(Tajikistan) Istiklol Dushanbe	3	1	1	1	6	4	+2	4
(Moldova) Iskra-Stal Rîbnița	3	1	1	1	2	2	0	4
(Kyrgyzstan) Neftchi Kochkor-Ata	3	0	0	3	0	9	−9	0

15 January 2011 1	Inter Baku (Azerbaijan)	3–0	(Kyrgyzstan) Neftchi Kochkor-Ata	Saint Petersburg
12:00 AZT (UTC+4)	Karlsons 20'; Chertoganov 45'; Yegorov 78'	[ Report]		Stadium: Petersburg SCC; Attendance: 200; Referee: Vitali Meshkov (Russia)

16 January 2011 2	Esteghlal Dushanbe (Tajikistan)	0–3	(Azerbaijan) Inter Baku	Saint Petersburg
12:00 AZT (UTC+4)		[ Report]	Ergashev 44' (o.g.); Savonkulov 64' (o.g.); Rahimov 79'	Stadium: Petersburg SCC; Attendance: 300; Referee: Sergey Lapochkin (Russia)

18 January 2011 3	Inter Baku (Azerbaijan)	1–0	(Moldova) Iskra-Stal	Saint Petersburg
12:00 AZT (UTC+4)	Amiraslanov 80'	[ Report]		Stadium: Petersburg SCC; Attendance: 1,000; Referee: Timur Arslanbekov (Russia)

==== Knockout stages ====
19 January 2011 Quarter-Final	Inter Baku (Azerbaijan)	4–0	(Armenia) Mika	Saint Petersburg
AZT (UTC+4)	Levin 30'; Karlsons 36', 60'; Kruglov 52'	[ Report]		Stadium: Petersburg SCC; Attendance: 1,500

21 January 2011 Semi-Final	Inter Baku (Azerbaijan)	5–0	(Russia) Zenit St.Petersburg	Saint Petersburg
AZT (UTC+4)	Karlsons 2', 15', 53'; Zlatinov 7'; Amiraslanov 68'	[ Report]		Stadium: Petersburg SCC; Attendance: 3,000

==== Final ====
23 January 2011

Inter Baku (Azerbaijan)	0–0	(Belarus) Shakhtyor Soligorsk
Penalties
	6–5

Petersburg SCC, Saint Petersburg
Attendance: 6,000
Referee: Vladislav Bezborodov

(Azerbaijan); INTER:
GK	(Georgia (country)) Giorgi Lomaia
DF	(Estonia) Dmitri Kruglov		(substituted off) 46'
MF	(Azerbaijan) Aleksandr Chertoganov	(yellow card) 88'
MF	(Czech Republic) Bronislav Červenka
MF	(Bulgaria) Petar Zlatinov
DF	(Azerbaijan) Vladimir Levin (c)	(yellow card) 49'
DF	(Georgia (country)) Ilia Kandelaki
MF	(Georgia (country)) David Odikadze		(substituted off) 70'
FW	(Latvia) Ģirts Karlsons
DF	(Azerbaijan) Arif Dashdemirov		(substituted off) 83'
DF	(Georgia (country)) Valeri Abramidze
Substitutions:
MF	(Azerbaijan) Rovshan Amiraslanov	(yellow card) 71'	(substituted on) 46' (substituted off) 110'
DF	(Brazil) Accioly		(substituted on) 110'
MF	(Russia) Sergei Yegorov		(substituted on) 70'
MF	(Georgia (country)) Kakhaber Mjavanadze		(substituted on) 83'
Manager:
(Georgia (country)) Kakhaber Tskhadadze Assistant referees: Lebedev; Zaripov

(Belarus); SHAKHTSYOR:
GK	(Lithuania) Eduardas Kurskis
XX	Kolomyts
DF	(Belarus) Artem Chelyadinsky	(yellow card) 22'
DF	(Belarus) Aleksey Yanushkevich
DF	(Belarus) Denis Polyakov
DF	(Belarus) Ihar Razhkow	(yellow card) 87'
MF	(Belarus) Andrey Lyavonchyk
MF	(Belarus) Alyaksandr Grenkow
MF	(Belarus) Pavel Sitko	(yellow card) 75'
FW	(Russia) Aleksandr Alumona
MF	(Belarus) Alyaksey Ryas	(substituted off) 76'
Substitutes:
FW	(Belarus) Alyaksey Pyatrow	(substituted on) 76'
Manager:
(Belarus) Uladzimir Zhuravel

== Squad statistics ==
=== Appearances and goals ===
No.	Pos	Nat	Player	Total		Premier League		Azerbaijan Cup		Champions League	
No.	Pos	Nat	Player	Apps	Goals	Apps	Goals	Apps	Goals	Apps	Goals
1	GK	(Georgia (country)) GEO	Giorgi Lomaia	28	0	22+0	0	4+0	0	2+0	0
4	DF	(Brazil) BRA	Danildo Accioly	27	2	22+2	2	2+0	0	1+0	0
6	DF	(Estonia) EST	Dmitri Kruglov	39	2	24+8	2	4+1	0	1+1	0
8	MF	(Azerbaijan) AZE	Aleksandr Chertoganov	39	1	30+1	1	6+0	0	2+0	0
9	FW	(Azerbaijan) AZE	Rovshan Amiraslanov	22	5	13+5	3	4+0	2	0+0	0
11	FW	(Azerbaijan) AZE	Asif Mammadov	14	0	4+5	0	3+2	0	0+0	0
12	MF	(North Macedonia) MKD	Filip Despotovski	16	1	11+1	1	2+2	0	0+0	0
13	MF	(Czech Republic) CZE	Bronislav Červenka	37	1	25+4	1	4+2	0	2+0	0
14	MF	(Bulgaria) BUL	Petar Zlatinov	29	2	19+5	2	3+0	0	2+0	0
15	DF	(Azerbaijan) AZE	Volodimir Levin	31	1	21+2	1	6+0	0	2+0	0
16	FW	(Azerbaijan) AZE	Elnur Abdulov	2	0	0+1	0	1+0	0	0+0	0
18	DF	(Georgia (country)) GEO	Ilia Kandelaki	28	1	23+1	1	2+0	0	2+0	0
19	MF	(Georgia (country)) GEO	David Odikadze	35	4	26+2	3	4+1	1	2+0	0
20	FW	(Latvia) LAT	Ģirts Karlsons	36	5	15+14	2	3+2	3	0+2	0
21	DF	(Azerbaijan) AZE	Arif Dashdemirov	35	1	25+5	1	3+0	0	0+2	0
23	DF	(Azerbaijan) AZE	Shahriyar Rahimov	11	0	4+7	0	0+0	0	0+0	0
28	FW	(Georgia (country)) GEO	Bachana Tskhadadze	2	0	0+1	0	0+1	0	0+0	0
32	FW	(Lithuania) LTU	Robertas Poškus	33	6	17+9	5	3+2	1	2+0	0
44	DF	(Georgia (country)) GEO	Valeri Abramidze	25	0	21+0	0	4+0	0	0+0	0
72	GK	(Azerbaijan) AZE	Dmitriy Kramarenko	11	0	9+0	0	2+0	0	0+0	0
77	MF	(Bulgaria) BUL	Daniel Genov	8	0	1+6	0	1+0	0	0+0	0
88	DF	(Georgia (country)) GEO	Kakhaber Mzhavanadze	22	0	8+7	0	3+2	0	2+0	0
	MF	(Azerbaijan) AZE	Asif Mirili	1	0	0+0	0	1+0	0	0+0	0
Players who appeared for Inter Baku who left on loan during the season:
5	DF	(Bulgaria) BUL	Zhivko Zhelev	2	0	1+0	0	0+0	0	1+0	0
7	FW	(Azerbaijan) AZE	Nizami Hajiyev	3	1	0+1	0	0+0	0	1+1	1
10	MF	(Azerbaijan) AZE	Jamal Mammadov	1	0	0+1	0	0+0	0	0+0	0
35	MF	(Brazil) BRA	Mario Sergio	10	3	7+3	3	0+0	0	0+0	0
Players who appeared for Inter Baku who left during the season:
84	DF	(Brazil) BRA	Filipe Machado	8	0	4+3	0	1+0	0	0+0	0

=== Goal scorers ===
Place	Position	Nation	Number	Name	Premier League	Azerbaijan Cup	Champions League	Total
1	FW	(Lithuania)	32	Robertas Poškus	5	1	0	6
1	FW	(Latvia)	20	Ģirts Karlsons	2	3	1	6
3	FW	(Azerbaijan)	9	Rovshan Amiraslanov	3	2	0	5
4	MF	(Georgia (country))	19	David Odikadze	3	1	0	4
5	MF	(Bulgaria)	14	Petar Zlatinov	2	0	0	2
5	DF	(Brazil)	4	Danildo Accioly	2	0	0	2
5	DF	(Estonia)	6	Dmitri Kruglov	2	0	0	2
8	MF	(Azerbaijan)	8	Aleksandr Chertoganov	1	0	0	1
8	MF	(North Macedonia)	12	Filip Despotovski	1	0	0	1
8	MF	(Czech Republic)	13	Bronislav Červenka	1	0	0	1
8	DF	(Azerbaijan)	15	Volodimir Levin	1	0	0	1
8	DF	(Georgia (country))	18	Ilia Kandelaki	1	0	0	1
8	DF	(Azerbaijan)	21	Arif Dashdemirov	1	0	0	1
8	MF	(Brazil)	35	Mario Sergio	1	0	0	1
8	MF	(Azerbaijan)	7	Aizami Hajiyev	0	0	1	1
8				Own goal	1	0	0	1
				TOTALS	29	7	1	37

=== Disciplinary record ===
Number	Nation	Position	Name	Premier League		Azerbaijan Cup		Champions League		Total	
Number	Nation	Position	Name	Yellow card	Red card	Yellow card	Red card	Yellow card	Red card	Yellow card	Red card
1	(Georgia (country))	GK	Giorgi Lomaia	2	0	0	0	1	0	3	0
4	(Brazil)	DF	Danildo Accioly	5	0	0	0	0	0	5	0
5	(Bulgaria)	DF	Zhivko Zhelev	1	0	0	0	0	0	1	0
6	(Estonia)	DF	Dmitri Kruglov	3	0	0	0	1	0	4	0
7	(Azerbaijan)	MF	Nizami Hajiyev	0	0	0	0	1	0	1	0
8	(Azerbaijan)	MF	Aleksandr Chertoganov	6	0	1	0	1	0	8	0
9	(Azerbaijan)	FW	Rovshan Amiraslanov	1	0	0	0	0	0	1	0
12	(North Macedonia)	MF	Filip Despotovski	1	0	0	0	0	0	1	0
13	(Czech Republic)	MF	Bronislav Červenka	6	0	0	0	1	0	7	0
14	(Bulgaria)	MF	Petar Zlatinov	2	0	0	0	1	0	3	0
15	(Azerbaijan)	DF	Volodimir Levin	1	0	1	0	2	0	4	0
16	(Azerbaijan)	FW	Elnur Abdulov	0	0	1	0	0	0	1	0
18	(Georgia (country))	DF	Ilia Kandelaki	3	0	1	0	0	0	4	0
19	(Georgia (country))	MF	David Odikadze	2	0	0	0	0	0	2	0
20	(Latvia)	FW	Ģirts Karlsons	1	0	1	0	1	0	3	0
21	(Azerbaijan)	DF	Arif Dashdemirov	6	0	0	0	0	0	6	0
23	(Azerbaijan)	DF	Shahriyar Rahimov	2	0	0	0	0	0	2	0
32	(Lithuania)	FW	Robertas Poškus	4	0	2	0	0	0	6	0
44	(Georgia (country))	DF	Valeri Abramidze	2	0	0	0	0	0	2	0
72	(Azerbaijan)	GK	Dmitriy Kramarenko	2	0	0	0	0	0	2	0
77	(Bulgaria)	MF	Daniel Genov	1	0	0	0	0	0	1	0
88	(Georgia (country))	DF	Kakhaber Mzhavanadze	3	1	1	0	0	0	4	1
			TOTALS	54	1	8	0	9	0	71	1
