= 2011–12 FC Inter Baku season =

Inter Baku
2011–12 season
- President: Jahangir Hajiyev
- Manager: Kakhaber Tskhadadze
- Stadium: Shafa Stadium
- Premier League: 3rd
- Azerbaijan Cup: Semi-final vs Neftchi Baku
- Top goalscorer: League: Bachana Tskhadadze 7 All: Bachana Tskhadadze 8
- Highest home attendance: 5,200 vs Khazar Lankaran; 30 September 2011
- Lowest home attendance: 300 vs Sumgayit; 20 February 2012; Ravan Baku; 6 March 2012
- Average home league attendance: 1647
Home colours	Away colours

The Inter Baku 2011–12 season was Inter Baku's eleventh Azerbaijan Premier League season, and their third season under manager Kakhaber Tskhadadze. They finished the season in 3rd place, qualifying for the 2012–13 UEFA Europa League, entering at the First qualifying round. They also participated in the 2011–12 Azerbaijan Cup, losing to Neftchi Baku in the semi-finals.

== Squad ==
As of 30 December 2011

Note: Flags indicate national team as defined under FIFA eligibility rules; some limited exceptions apply. Players may hold more than one non-FIFA nationality.

No.	Pos.	Nation	Player
1	GK	GEO	Giorgi Lomaia
2	DF	AZE	Khayal Mustafayev
5	DF	AZE	Rustam Abbasov
6	MF	AZE	Samir Zargarov
8	MF	AZE	Nizami Hajiyev
9	FW	BUL	Enyo Krastovchev
10	MF	AZE	Asif Mirili
11	MF	AZE	Asif Mammadov
13	MF	CZE	Bronislav Červenka
14	MF	BUL	Petar Zlatinov
15	DF	AZE	Volodimir Levin (captain)
16	FW	AZE	Elnur Abdulov

No.	Pos.	Nation	Player
18	DF	GEO	Ilia Kandelaki
20	FW	LAT	Ģirts Karlsons
21	DF	AZE	Arif Dashdemirov
22	DF	SVK	Peter Chrappan
25	MF	SEN	Ibrahima Niasse
28	FW	GEO	Bachana Tskhadadze
29	DF	AZE	Aziz Guliyev
30	DF	BRA	Danildo Accioly
32	GK	AZE	Dmitriy Kramarenko
44	DF	GEO	Valeri Abramidze
90	GK	AZE	Salahat Ağayev
99	GK	AZE	Anar Maharramov

== Transfers ==
=== Summer ===
In: Note: Flags indicate national team as defined under FIFA eligibility rules; some limited exceptions apply. Players may hold more than one non-FIFA nationality.

No.	Pos.	Nation	Player
2	DF	AZE	Khayal Mustafayev (from (Azerbaijan) FC Kəpəz)
5	DF	AZE	Rustam Abbasov (from (Russia) FC Tolyatti)
6	MF	AZE	Samir Zargarov (from (Azerbaijan) FC Kəpəz)
7	DF	AZE	Ruslan Poladov (from (Azerbaijan) Khazar Lankaran)
9	FW	BUL	Enyo Krastovchev (from (Azerbaijan) AZAL Baku)
11	MF	AZE	Asif Mammadov (from (Azerbaijan) Khazar Lankaran)
22	DF	SVK	Peter Chrappan (from (Austria) Mattersburg)
—	MF	BRA	Diego Souza (from (Azerbaijan) Khazar Lankaran)

Out: Note: Flags indicate national team as defined under FIFA eligibility rules; some limited exceptions apply. Players may hold more than one non-FIFA nationality.

No.	Pos.	Nation	Player
5	DF	BUL	Zhivko Zhelev (to (Bulgaria) Slavia Sofia)
6	MF	EST	Dmitri Kruglov (to (Russia) Rostov)
8	MF	AZE	Aleksandr Chertoganov (to (Azerbaijan) Gabala)
10	MF	AZE	Jamal Mammadov (to (Azerbaijan) Turan Tovuz)
12	MF	MKD	Filip Despotovski (to (North Macedonia) Rabotnički)
19	MF	GEO	David Odikadze (to (Georgia (country)) Dinamo Tbilisi)
32	FW	LTU	Robertas Poškus (to (Azerbaijan) Simurq)
77	MF	BUL	Daniel Genov (on loan to (Azerbaijan) Simurq)
88	DF	GEO	Kakhaber Mzhavanadze
—	MF	AZE	Tofig Mikayilov (on loan to (Azerbaijan) Simurq)
—	FW	AZE	Ali Bagirov (on loan to (Azerbaijan) Simurq)
—	MF	AZE	Rovshan Amiraslanov (to (Azerbaijan) Gabala)
—	MF	AZE	Aleksandr Gross (on loan to (Azerbaijan) Sumgayit City)
—	MF	BRA	Mario Sergio
—	FW	AZE	Sabuhi Ismayilov (to (Azerbaijan) MOIK Baku)

=== Winter ===
In: Note: Flags indicate national team as defined under FIFA eligibility rules; some limited exceptions apply. Players may hold more than one non-FIFA nationality.

No.	Pos.	Nation	Player
25	MF	SEN	Ibrahima Niasse (from (Switzerland) Neuchâtel Xamax)
29	MF	AZE	Aziz Guliyev (from (Azerbaijan) FC Baku)

Out: Note: Flags indicate national team as defined under FIFA eligibility rules; some limited exceptions apply. Players may hold more than one non-FIFA nationality.

No.	Pos.	Nation	Player
5	DF	AZE	Rustam Abbasov (on loan to (Azerbaijan) Simurq)
7	MF	AZE	Ruslan Poladov (on loan to (Azerbaijan) Simurq)
23	DF	AZE	Shahriyar Rahimov (on loan to (Azerbaijan) AZAL)
72	GK	AZE	Dmitri Kramarenko (on loan to (Azerbaijan) Simurq)
—	MF	BRA	Diego Souza (to (Brazil) Itapirense)

== Competitions ==
=== Azerbaijan Premier League ===
==== Results summary ====
Overall								Home						Away					
Pld	W	D	L	GF	GA	GD	Pts	W	D	L	GF	GA	GD	W	D	L	GF	GA	GD
22	13	7	2	21	10	+11	46	6	4	1	10	6	+4	7	3	1	11	4	+7

Last updated: 21 December 2011.
Source: Soccerway

==== Results by round ====
Round	1	2	3	4	5	6	7	8	9	10	11	12	13	14	15	16	17	18	19	20	21	22
Ground	H	A	H	H	A	A	H	H	A	H	A	A	H	H	A	A	H	A	A	H	A	H
Result	W	L	L	W	W	D	D	W	W	D	W	W	D	D	W	D	W	W	W	W	L	W
Position																			2	2	2	2

Source: Soccerway
A = Away; H = Home; W = Win; D = Draw; L = Loss

==== Results ====
6 August 2011 1	Inter Baku	1–0	Turan	Shafa Stadium
20:00 AZST (UTC+5)	Abdulov 54'	Summary		Attendance: 500; Referee: Aliyar Agayev

14 August 2011 2	Qarabağ	1–0	Inter Baku	Guzanli Olympic Stadium
18:00 AZST (UTC+5)	Aliyev 52'	Summary		Attendance: 5,000; Referee: Elchin Mämmädov

20 August 2011 3	Inter Baku	0–3^{1}	Baku	Shafa Stadium
21:00 AZST (UTC+5)	Lomaia (red card) 90+1'	Summary		Attendance: 2500; Referee: Ramil Diniyev

27 August 2011 4	Inter Baku	1–0	Simurq	Shafa Stadium
19:00 AZST (UTC+5)	Abramidze 53'	Summary		Attendance: 600; Referee: Rahim Hasanov

11 September 2011 5	Sumgayit	0–2	Inter Baku	Mehdi Huseynzade Stadium
17:00 AZST (UTC+5)		Summary	Dashdemirov 71'; Zargarov 90+2'	Attendance: 2,000; Referee: Elnur Muradov

17 September 2011 6	AZAL	1–1	Inter Baku	AZAL Stadium
19:00 AZST (UTC+5)	Boghiu 49'	Summary	Levin 87'	Attendance: 2,000; Referee: Rovshan Ahmadov

23 September 2011 7	Inter Baku	0–0	Kəpəz	Ganja City Stadium
19:00 AZST (UTC+5)		Summary		Attendance: 1,000; Referee: Rahim Hasanov

30 September 2011 8	Inter Baku	1–0	Khazar Lankaran	Shafa Stadium
19:00 AZST (UTC+5)	Hajiyev 72'	Summary		Attendance: 5,200; Referee: Aliyar Agayev

16 October 2011 9	Neftchi	0–1	Inter Baku	Ismat Gayibov Stadium
15:30 AZST (UTC+5)	Abishov (red card) 82'	Summary	Tskhadadze 34'; Zargarov (red card) 80'	Attendance: 1,500; Referee: Elchin Mammadov

22 October 2011 10	Inter Baku	1–1	Gabala	Shafa Stadium
19:00 AZST (UTC+5)	Accioly 20' (pen.)	Summary	Burton 58' (pen.)	Attendance: 1,000; Referee: Rovshan Ahmadov

28 October 2011 11	Ravan Baku	1–2	Inter Baku	Dalga Arena
14:30 AZST (UTC+5)	Hodžić 90+1'	Summary	Kandelaki 13'; Abdulov 44'	Attendance: 800; Referee: Aliyar Agayev

6 November 2011 12	Turan	0–1	Inter Baku	Tovuz City Stadium
14:00 AZT (UTC+4)		Summary	Hajiyev 8'	Attendance: 2,500; Referee: Rovshan Ahmadov

19 November 2011 13	Inter Baku	0–0	Qarabağ	Shafa Stadium
18:00 AZT (UTC+4)		Summary		Attendance: 2,000; Referee: Elchin Mämmädov

25 November 2011 14	Inter Baku	1–1	AZAL	Shafa Stadium
18:00 AZT (UTC+4)	Zargarov 54'	Summary	Tales Schutz 10'	Attendance: 1,600; Referee: Rovshan Ahmadov

4 December 2011 15	Khazar Lankaran	0–1	Inter Baku	Lankaran City Stadium
16:00 AZT (UTC+4)		Summary	Tskhadadze 78'	Attendance: 7,500; Referee: Vusal Aliyev

10 December 2011 16	Gabala	0–0	Inter Baku	Gabala City Stadium
14:00 AZT (UTC+4)		Summary		Attendance: 1,000; Referee: Fariz Yusifov

16 December 2011 17	Inter Baku	2–1	Neftchi	Shafa Stadium
17:00 AZT (UTC+4)	Tskhadadze 63'; Kandelaki 71'	Summary	R.Abdullayev 41'	Attendance: 3,000; Referee: Elchin Mämmädov

21 December 2011 18	Simurq	0–2	Inter Baku	Zaqatala City Stadium
16:00 AZT (UTC+4)	Qirtimov (red card) 54'	Summary	Tskhadadze 13' (pen.); Krastovchev 88'	Attendance: 1,200; Referee: Elvin Askerov

16 February 2012 19	Kəpəz	0–1	Inter Baku	Ganja City Stadium
14:00 AZT (UTC+4)		Summary	Hajiyev 89'	Attendance: 700; Referee: Elchin Mämmädov

20 February 2012 20	Inter Baku	2–0	Sumgayit	Shafa Stadium
14:00 AZT (UTC+4)	Tskhadadze 34'; Dashdemirov (red card) 35'; Levin 65'	Summary		Attendance: 300; Referee: Elchin Mämmädov

2 March 2012 21	Baku	1–0	Inter Baku	Tofig Bahramov Stadium
14:30 AZT (UTC+4)	Juninho 11'; Mammadov (red card) 65'	Summary		Attendance: 1,000; Referee: Elchin Mämmädov

6 March 2012 22	Inter Baku	1–0	Ravan Baku	Shafa Stadium
16:00 AZT (UTC+4)	Niasse 43'	Summary		Attendance: 300; Referee: Rahim Hasanov

Notes

- Match Abandoned in the 94th minute, at 0–0. Match awarded 0–3

==== Table ====
Pos	Team	Pld	W	D	L	GF	GA	GD	Pts	Qualification
1	Neftçi Baku	22	16	1	5	45	17	+28	49	Qualification for championship group
2	Inter Baku	22	13	6	3	21	10	+11	45	Qualification for championship group
3	Khazar Lankaran	22	13	5	4	33	19	+14	44	Qualification for championship group
4	Qarabağ	22	12	5	5	27	14	+13	41	Qualification for championship group
5	Baku	22	10	5	7	27	22	+5	35	Qualification for championship group

Source: Soccerway: Azerbaijan Premier League Table
Rules for classification: 1) points; 2) goal difference; 3) number of goals scored.

=== Azerbaijan Premier League Championship Group ===
==== Results summary ====
Overall								Home						Away					
Pld	W	D	L	GF	GA	GD	Pts	W	D	L	GF	GA	GD	W	D	L	GF	GA	GD
10	3	2	5	8	11	−3	11	2	2	1	5	4	+1	1	0	4	3	7	−4

Last updated: 21 December 2011.
Source: Soccerway

==== Results by round ====
Round	1	2	3	4	5	6	7	8	9	10
Ground	A	H	A	A	H	A	H	H	A	H
Result	W	L	L	L	D	L	W	D	L	W
Position	2	2	3	4	4	4	2	3	4	3

Source: Soccerway
A = Away; H = Home; W = Win; D = Draw; L = Loss

==== Results ====
11 March 2012 23	Baku	0–1	Inter	Tofig Bakhramov Stadium
16:00 AZT (UTC+4)		Summary	Niasse 34'; Mammadov (yellow card) 62' (yellow-red card) 63'	Attendance: 400; Referee: Anar Salmanov

18 March 2012 24	Inter	1–2	Neftchi Baku	Shafa Stadium
16:00 AZT (UTC+4)	Červenka 45'	Summary	Georgievski 5'; Amirjanov 77'	Attendance: 2,000; Referee: Fariz Yusifov

24 March 2012 25	Gabala	2–1	Inter	Gabala City Stadium
15:00 AZT (UTC+4)	Kamanan 61'; Burton 83'	Summary	Hajiyev 77'; Mustafayev (red card) 89'	Attendance: 2,000; Referee: Anar Salmanov

1 April 2012 26	Khazar Lankaran	2–0	Inter Baku	Lankaran City Stadium
18:00 AZST (UTC+5)	Doman 42'; Bates (yellow card) 24' (yellow-red card) 74'; Bonfim 90+2'	Summary	Guliyev (yellow card) 11' (yellow-red card) 41'; Abramidze (yellow card) 28' (red card) 85'	Attendance: 10,000; Referee: Elchin Mämmädov

7 April 2012 27	Inter	1–1	Qarabağ	Shafa Stadium
16:00 AZST (UTC+5)	Tskhadadze 90+1'	Summary	Medvedev 75'	Attendance: 2,000; Referee: Aliyar Agayev

14 April 2012 28	Neftchi	2–1	Inter	Ismat Gayibov Stadium
17:30 AZST (UTC+5)	Nasimov 5'; Georgievski 12'	Summary	Abishov 43' (o.g.)	Attendance: 2,500; Referee: Anar Salmanov

22 April 2012 29	Inter	2–1	Gabala	Shafa Stadium
18:00 AZST (UTC+5)	Hajiyev 25'; Niasse 31'	Summary	Dodo 8'; Shukurov (yellow card) 57' (yellow-red card) 81'	Attendance: 1,000; Referee: Elvin Askerov

29 May 2012 30	Inter	0–0	Khazar Lankaran	Shafa Stadium
19:00 AZST (UTC+5)		Summary		Attendance: 3,000; Referee: Aliyar Agayev

5 May 2012 31	Qarabağ	1–0	Inter	Guzanli Olympic Complex Stadium
17:30 AZST (UTC+5)	Levin 75' (o.g.)	Summary		Attendance: 2,000; Referee: Fariz Yusifov

11 May 2012 32	Inter	1–0	Baku	Shafa Stadium
17:30 AZST (UTC+5)	Tskhadadze 65'	Summary		Attendance: 350; Referee: Vusal Aliyev

==== Table ====
Pos	Team	Pld	W	D	L	GF	GA	GD	Pts	Qualification or relegation
1	Neftçi Baku (C)	32	20	3	9	55	30	+25	63	Qualification for Champions League second qualifying round
2	Khazar Lankaran	32	17	8	7	44	28	+16	59	Qualification for Europa League first qualifying round (Note: Baku qualified for the first qualifiying round of the 2012–13 UEFA Europa League as winner of the 2011–12 Azerbaijan Cup.)
3	Inter Baku	32	16	8	8	29	21	+8	56	Qualification for Europa League first qualifying round
4	Qarabağ	32	15	8	9	37	28	+9	53	
5	Gabala	32	15	7	10	43	32	+11	52	
6	Baku	32	15	5	12	42	37	+5	50	Qualification for Europa League first qualifying round

Source: Soccerway.com
Rules for classification: 1) points; 2) goal difference; 3) number of goals scored.
(C) Champions

=== Azerbaijan Cup ===
30 November 2011 First Round	Inter Baku	3–0^{1}	Turan	Shafa Stadium
17:00 AZT (UTC+4)		Summary		Attendance: 300; Referee: Fuad Hasanov

14 March 2012 Quarterfinals 1st Leg	Inter Baku	3–2	Khazar Lankaran	Shafa Stadium
16:00 AZT (UTC+4)	Hajiyev 41'; Krastovchev 78'; Karlsons 87' (pen.)	Summary	Abdullayev 46'; Brenes 57'	Attendance: 2,000; Referee: Aliyar Agayev

28 March 2012 Quarterfinals 2nd Leg	Khazar Lankaran	1–1 (3–4 agg.)	Inter Baku	Lankaran City Stadium
18:00 AZT (UTC+4)	Brenes 76'	Summary	Tskhadadze 30'	Attendance: 8,000; Referee: Fariz Yusifov

18 April 2012 Semi-final 1st Leg	Inter Baku	0–0	Neftchi Baku	Shafa Stadium
18:00 AZST (UTC+5)		Summary		Attendance: 1,000; Referee: Aliyar Agayev

24 April 2012 Semi-final 2nd Leg	Neftchi Baku	1–0 (1–0 agg.)	Inter Baku	Tofik Bakhramov Stadium
17:20 AZST (UTC+5)	Imamverdiyev 22'	Summary		Attendance: 1,000; Referee: Fariz Yusifov

Notes

- Match Abandoned after Turan refused to restart the game after conceding a disputed goal, Match awarded 3–0

== Squad statistics ==
As of 28 September 2012

=== Appearances and goals ===
No.	Pos	Nat	Player	Total		Premier League		Azerbaijan Cup	
No.	Pos	Nat	Player	Apps	Goals	Apps	Goals	Apps	Goals
1	GK	(Georgia (country)) GEO	Giorgi Lomaia	33	0	29+0	0	4+0	0
2	DF	(Azerbaijan) AZE	Khayal Mustafayev	7	0	5+2	0	0+0	0
6	MF	(Azerbaijan) AZE	Samir Zargarov	28	2	12+12	2	2+2	0
8	MF	(Azerbaijan) AZE	Nizami Hajiyev	31	6	16+11	5	3+1	1
9	FW	(Bulgaria) BUL	Enyo Krastovchev	17	2	7+8	1	0+2	1
10	MF	(Azerbaijan) AZE	Asif Mirili	11	0	5+6	0	0+0	0
11	MF	(Azerbaijan) AZE	Asif Mammadov	31	0	22+6	0	3+0	0
13	MF	(Czech Republic) CZE	Bronislav Červenka	32	1	22+6	1	3+1	0
14	MF	(Bulgaria) BUL	Petar Zlatinov	32	0	24+6	0	1+1	0
15	DF	(Azerbaijan) AZE	Volodimir Levin	31	1	27+0	1	4+0	0
16	FW	(Azerbaijan) AZE	Elnur Abdulov	14	2	9+5	2	0+0	0
18	DF	(Georgia (country)) GEO	Ilia Kandelaki	31	2	27+0	2	4+0	0
20	FW	(Latvia) LAT	Ģirts Karlsons	17	1	6+9	0	2+0	1
21	DF	(Azerbaijan) AZE	Arif Dashdemirov	31	1	26+1	1	4+0	0
22	DF	(Slovakia) SVK	Peter Chrappan	25	0	20+1	0	4+0	0
25	MF	(Senegal) SEN	Ibrahima Niasse	25	3	19+2	3	4+0	0
28	FW	(Georgia (country)) GEO	Bachana Tskhadadze	32	8	21+8	7	2+1	1
30	DF	(Brazil) BRA	Danildo Accioly	13	1	12+1	1	0+0	0
44	DF	(Georgia (country)) GEO	Valeri Abramidze	33	1	29+0	1	4+0	0
90	GK	(Azerbaijan) AZE	Salahat Ağayev	3	0	3+0	0	0+0	0
Players away from Inter Baku on loan:
7	MF	(Azerbaijan) AZE	Ruslan Poladov	3	0	3+0	0	0+0	0
Players who appeared for Inter Baku no longer at the club:
23	DF	(Azerbaijan) AZE	Shahriyar Rahimov	8	0	5+3	0	0+0	0
29	DF	(Azerbaijan) AZE	Aziz Guliyev	3	0	3+0	0	0+0	0

=== Goal scorers ===
Place	Position	Nation	Number	Name	Premier League	Azerbaijan Cup	Total
1	FW	(Georgia (country))	28	Bachana Tskhadadze	7	1	8
2	MF	(Azerbaijan)	8	Nizami Hajiyev	5	1	6
3	MF	(Senegal)	25	Ibrahima Niasse	3	0	3
4	FW	(Azerbaijan)	16	Elnur Abdulov	2	0	2
4	MF	(Azerbaijan)	6	Samir Zargarov	2	0	2
4	DF	(Georgia (country))	18	Ilia Kandelaki	2	0	2
4	DF	(Azerbaijan)	15	Volodimir Levin	2	0	2
4	FW	(Bulgaria)	9	Enyo Krastovchev	1	1	2
9	DF	(Georgia (country))	44	Valeri Abramidze	1	0	1
9	DF	(Azerbaijan)	21	Arif Dashdemirov	1	0	1
9	DF	(Brazil)	30	Danildo Accioly	1	0	1
9	MF	(Czech Republic)	13	Bronislav Červenka	1	0	1
9	FW	(Latvia)	20	Ģirts Karlsons	0	1	1
9				Own goal	1	0	1
9				Awarded Goals	0	3	3
				TOTALS	27	7	34

=== Disciplinary record ===
Number	Nation	Position	Name	Premier League		Azerbaijan Cup		Total	
Number	Nation	Position	Name	Yellow card	Red card	Yellow card	Red card	Yellow card	Red card
1	(Georgia (country))	GK	Giorgi Lomaia	4	1	0	0	4	1
2	(Azerbaijan)	DF	Khayal Mustafayev	2	1	0	0	2	1
6	(Azerbaijan)	MF	Samir Zargarov	3	1	0	0	3	1
8	(Azerbaijan)	MF	Nizami Hajiyev	3	0	0	0	3	0
9	(Bulgaria)	FW	Enyo Krastovchev	2	0	0	0	2	0
10	(Azerbaijan)	MF	Asif Mirili	2	0	0	0	2	0
11	(Azerbaijan)	MF	Asif Mammadov	11	1	1	0	12	1
13	(Czech Republic)	MF	Bronislav Červenka	3	0	1	0	4	0
14	(Bulgaria)	MF	Petar Zlatinov	6	0	0	0	6	0
15	(Azerbaijan)	DF	Volodimir Levin	2	0	1	0	3	0
16	(Azerbaijan)	FW	Elnur Abdulov	2	0	0	0	2	0
18	(Georgia (country))	DF	Ilia Kandelaki	7	0	1	0	8	0
20	(Latvia)	FW	Ģirts Karlsons	1	0	0	0	1	0
21	(Azerbaijan)	DF	Arif Dashdemirov	6	1	0	0	6	1
22	(Slovakia)	DF	Peter Chrappan	1	0	2	0	3	0
23	(Azerbaijan)	DF	Shahriyar Rahimov	1	0	0	0	1	0
25	(Senegal)	MF	Ibrahima Niasse	3	0	1	0	4	0
28	(Georgia (country))	FW	Bachana Tskhadadze	5	0	0	0	5	0
29	(Azerbaijan)	DF	Aziz Guliyev	2	1	0	0	2	1
30	(Brazil)	DF	Danildo Accioly	1	0	0	0	1	0
44	(Georgia (country))	DF	Valeri Abramidze	8	1	1	0	9	1
90	(Azerbaijan)	GK	Salahat Ağayev	1	0	0	0	1	0
			TOTALS	72	7	8	0	80	7

=== Awards ===
==== Player of the Month ====
MONTH	Name	Award
December	(Georgia (country)) Bachana Tskhadadze	Won

== Team kit ==
These are the 2011–12 Inter Baku kits.

Supplier: Umbro
Sponsor(s): IBA

Home	Away
