= Wilson Júnior (footballer, born 1976) =

Brazilian footballer

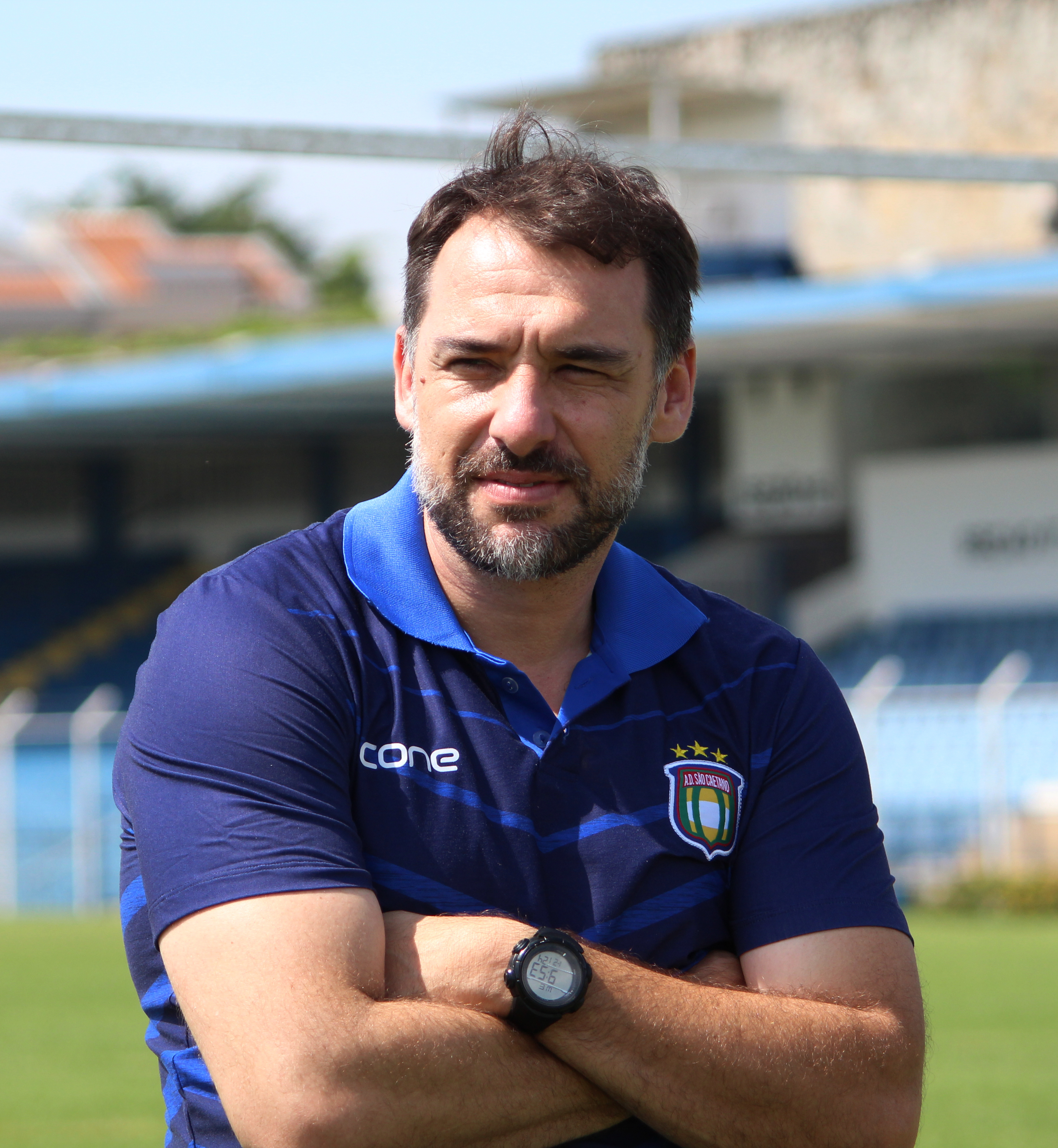
- Wilson Junior with São Caetano in 2022

Personal information
- Full name: Wilson Raimundo Júnior
- Date of birth: 27 October 1976 (age 50)
- Place of birth: São Bernardo do Campo, Brazil
- Height: 1.88 m (6 ft 2 in)
- Position: Goalkeeper

Team information
- Current team: São José-SP (head coach)

Youth career
- Corinthians

Senior career*
Years	Team	Apps	(Gls)
1995–1996	Corinthians	0	(0)
1997	Atlético Paranaense	0	(0)
1998	Náutico		
1999	Portuguesa Santista	19	(0)
1999	Botafogo	3	(0)
2000	Rio Branco-SP	9	(0)
2000	Ferro Carril Oeste	14	(0)
2001	Ceará	8	(0)
2002	Botafogo-SP	42	(0)
2003	São José-SP	14	(0)
2004	União Barbarense	10	(0)
2004–2005	Atlético Sorocaba	23	(0)
2005–2007	Naval	14	(0)
2007–2008	Naval	16	(0)
2008–2010	Inter Baku	35	(0)
2011–2014	São Bernardo	60	(0)
2012	→ Boa Esporte (loan)	13	(0)
2013	→ ABC (loan)	15	(0)
2014	Bragantino	1	(0)
2015	Matonense	10	(0)
Total		306	(0)

Managerial career
- 2015: Matonense
- 2015: São Bernardo
- 2016: Rio Preto
- 2016: Monte Azul
- 2017: Juventus-SP
- 2018–2019: São Bernardo
- 2019–2020: Atibaia
- 2021: São Caetano
- 2021: Santo André
- 2022: Primavera
- 2023: Mixto
- 2024: Taubaté
- 2024: Boa Esporte
- 2025: Náutico (assistant)
- 2025: Náutico U20
- 2026: São Bento
- 2026–: São José-SP
- * Club domestic league appearances and goals

Wilson Raimundo Júnior (born 27 October 1976), known as Wilson Júnior, is a Brazilian football coach and former player who played as a goalkeeper. He is the current head coach of São José-SP.

== Playing career ==
Born in São Bernardo do Campo, São Paulo, Wilson Júnior was a Corinthians youth graduate, being a part of the squad which won the 1995 Campeonato Paulista, but as a fifth-choice behind Ronaldo Giovanelli, Ricardo Pinto, Wilson Ricardo and Maizena. He later had spells at Atlético Paranaense and Náutico, before being a starter for Portuguesa Santista in the 1999 Campeonato Paulista.

In 1999, Wilson Júnior moved to Botafogo, and made his Série A debut on 15 August of that year, in a 2–1 away loss to Vasco da Gama. Rarely used, he returned to his native state with Rio Branco-SP in 2000, before joining Argentine side Ferro Carril Oeste, and having a subsequent spell at Ceará in the following year.

In the following seasons, Wilson Júnior represented Botafogo-SP, São José-SP, União Barbarense and Atlético Sorocaba, all in his native state, before moving abroad with Portuguese side Naval in August 2005.

In 2007, Wilson Júnior left Naval after reaching an agreement with Vitesse in the Netherlands, but the deal later collapsed, and he returned to Naval in September of that year. In the 2007–08 Primeira Liga, he was the first-choice for Naval, competing with Pedro Taborda for the spot. In 2008, he agreed to a deal with Inter Baku, but mainly acted as a backup to Svilen Simeonov.

Wilson Júnior moved to São Bernardo ahead of the 2011 season; and was a backup to Marcelo Pitol during the year's Paulistão. He still renewed his contract in April for the Copa Paulista, where he was a starter during the entire competition.

Still a starter in the following seasons, Wilson Júnior also served loan stints at Boa Esporte and ABC. In December 2014, after a short period at Bragantino, he retired to become the head coach of Guaratinguetá, but went back in the decision after the latter club's change of ownership, and signed for Matonense late in that month, as a player.

== Coaching career ==
In March 2015, Wilson Júnior retired to immediately become the head coach of his last club Matonense, after Luís dos Reis was sacked. In July, he returned to São Bernardo, now as head coach in the Copa Paulista.

On 26 October 2015, Wilson Júnior was named head coach of Rio Preto for the ensuing campaign, but was sacked the following 5 February. In March 2016, he took over Monte Azul, but was unable to prevent the club's relegation from the Campeonato Paulista Série A2.

On 21 October 2016, Wilson Júnior was presented as Juventus-SP's head coach. The following 2 May, he returned to São Bernardo, remaining in charge for more than a year before being dismissed on 10 February 2019.

In August 2019, Wilson Júnior was appointed Atibaia head coach. He renewed his contract in October, but left in September 2020.

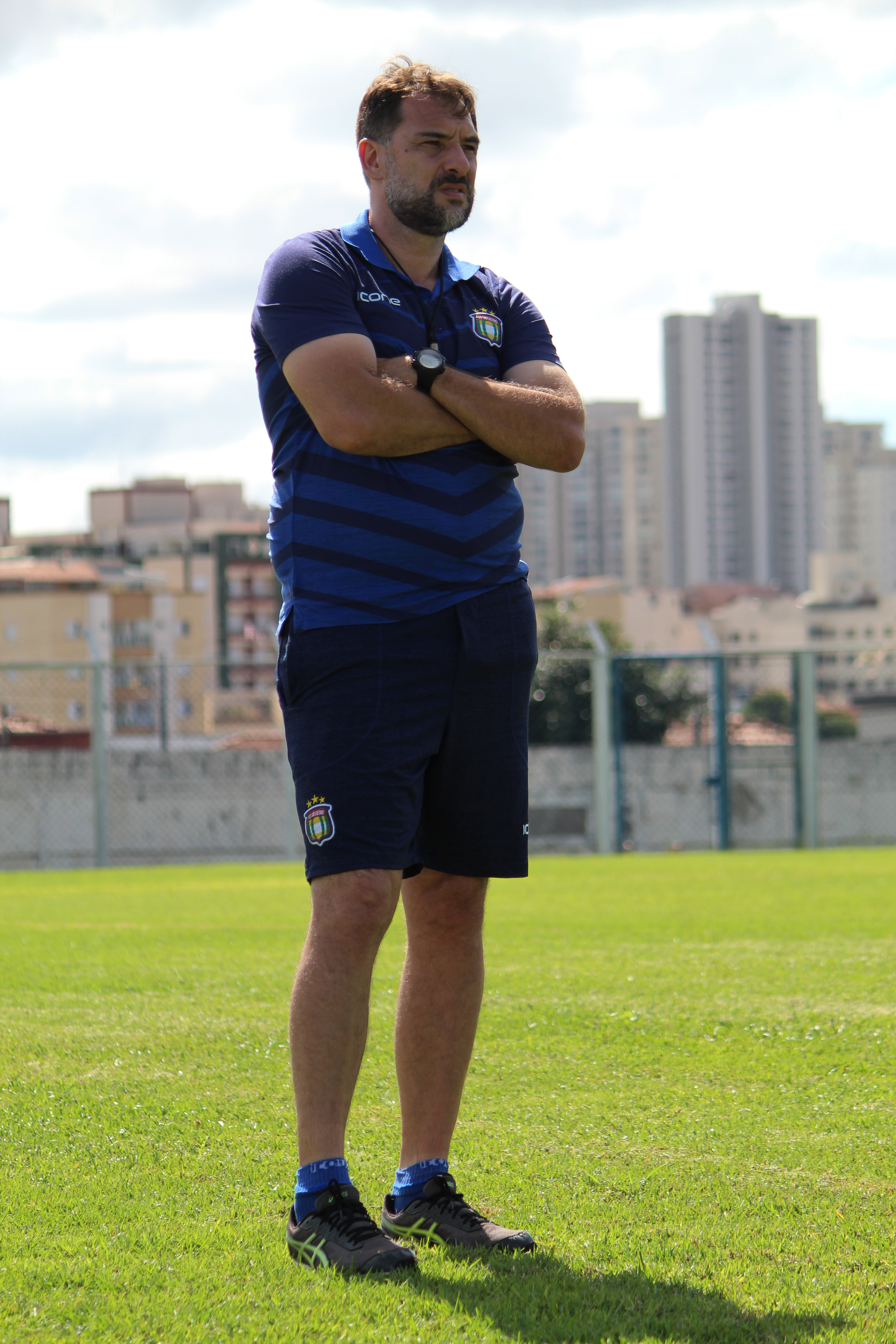
Wilson Júnior during a training session as head coach of São Caetano in 2021

Announced in charge of São Caetano on 11 January 2021, Wilson Júnior resigned on 14 April. He was presented at Santo André on 17 May, but left the club at the end of the season in September.

On 14 February 2022, Wilson Júnior replaced Ademir Fesan at the helm of Primavera, but was himself replaced by Moisés Egert on 29 August. He was announced as head coach of Mixto on 22 November, but was sacked the following 3 February, after three winless matches.

On 10 August 2023, Wilson Júnior agreed to become Taubaté's head coach for the upcoming season. He left at the end of the 2024 Paulistão Série A2, and took over another club he represented as aplayer, Boa Esporte, on 25 March of that year.

Wilson Júnior resigned from Boa on 27 May 2024, and returned to Náutico in January 2025, as a permanent assistant coach. Later in that year, he led the under-20 side to the Campeonato Pernambucano Sub-20 title.

On 3 February 2026, Wilson Júnior took over São Bento, but was also unable to prevent relegation from the Série A2. On 12 June, he was announced as head coach of another club he represented as a player, São José-SP.

== Career statistics ==
Appearances and goals by club, season and competition
Club	Season	League			State League		Cup		Continental		Other		Total	
Club	Season	Division	Apps	Goals	Apps	Goals	Apps	Goals	Apps	Goals	Apps	Goals	Apps	Goals
Portuguesa Santista	1999	Paulista	—		19	0	—		—		—		19	0
Botafogo	1999	Série A	3	0	—		—		—		—		3	0
Rio Branco-SP	2000	Copa João Havelange	0	0	9	0	—		—		—		9	0
Ferro Carril Oeste	2000–01	Primera B Nacional	14	0	—		—		—		—		14	0
Ceará	2001	Série B	0	0	8	0	3	0	—		1 (Note: Appearance(s) in Copa do Nordeste)	0	12	0
Botafogo-SP	2002	Série B	22	0	20	0	2	0	—		—		44	0
São José-SP	2003	Paulista A2	—		14	0	—		—		—		14	0
União Barbarense	2004	Série C	—		10	0	2	0	—		—		12	0
Atlético Sorocaba	2004	Série C	8	0	—		—		—		12 (Note: Appearance(s) in Copa Paulista)	0	20	0
Atlético Sorocaba	2005	Série C	0	0	15	0	—		—		—		15	0
Atlético Sorocaba	Total		8	0	15	0	—		—		12	0	35	0
Naval	2005–06	Primeira Liga	13	0	—		—		—		—		13	0
Naval	2006–07	Primeira Liga	1	0	—		2	0	—		—		3	0
Naval	2007–08	Primeira Liga	16	0	—		1	0	—		—		17	0
Naval	Total		30	0	—		3	0	—		—		33	0
Inter Baku	2008–09	Azerbaijan Premier League	23	0	—		0	0	0	0	—		23	0
Inter Baku	2009–10	Azerbaijan Premier League	12	0	—		0	0	2 (Note: Appearance(s) in UEFA Europa League)	0	—		14	0
Inter Baku	Total		35	0	—		0	0	2	0	—		37	0
São Bernardo	2011	Paulista	—		0	0	—		—		26	0	26	0
São Bernardo	2012	Paulista A2	—		26	0	—		—		11	0	37	0
São Bernardo	2013	Paulista	—		19	0	3	0	—		8	0	30	0
São Bernardo	2014	Paulista	—		15	0	2	0	—		—		17	0
São Bernardo	Total		—		60	0	5	0	—		45	0	110	0
Boa Esporte (loan)	2012	Série B	13	0	—		—		—		—		13	0
ABC (loan)	2013	Série B	15	0	—		—		—		—		15	0
Bragantino	2014	Série B	1	0	—		—		—		—		1	0
Matonense	2015	Paulista A2	—		10	0	—		—		—		10	0
Career total			141	0	165	0	15	0	2	0	58	0	381	0

== Coaching statistics ==
As of 14 June 2026

Managerial record by team and tenure
Team	Nat.	From	To	Record								Ref
Team	Nat.	From	To	G	W	D	L	GF	GA	GD	Win %	Ref
Matonense	(Brazil)	16 March 2015	10 May 2015	9	2	4	3	10	9	+1	22.22	
São Bernardo	(Brazil)	31 July 2015	20 October 2015	12	5	3	4	18	15	+3	41.67	
Rio Preto	(Brazil)	26 October 2015	5 February 2016	3	0	1	2	0	2	−2	0.00	
Monte Azul	(Brazil)	1 March 2016	10 April 2016	9	3	3	3	8	10	−2	33.33	
Juventus-SP	(Brazil)	21 October 2016	30 April 2017	19	8	6	5	21	17	+4	42.11	
São Bernardo	(Brazil)	2 May 2017	10 February 2019	51	19	19	13	58	46	+12	37.25	
Atibaia	(Brazil)	1 August 2019	4 September 2020	19	5	7	7	19	18	+1	26.32	
São Caetano	(Brazil)	11 January 2021	14 April 2021	6	0	1	5	1	13	−12	0.00	
Santo André	(Brazil)	17 May 2021	23 September 2021	16	7	3	6	17	14	+3	43.75	
Primavera	(Brazil)	14 February 2022	29 August 2022	19	7	8	4	17	15	+2	36.84	
Mixto	(Brazil)	22 November 2022	3 February 2023	3	0	0	3	2	7	−5	0.00	
Taubaté	(Brazil)	10 August 2023	20 March 2024	15	4	5	6	12	19	−7	26.67	
Boa Esporte	(Brazil)	25 March 2024	27 May 2024	5	0	3	2	4	7	−3	0.00	
São Bento	(Brazil)	3 February 2026	1 March 2026	7	1	2	4	5	9	−4	14.29	
São José-SP	(Brazil)	12 June 2026	present	0	0	0	0	0	0	+0	—	
Career total				193	61	65	67	192	201	−9	31.61	—
