= Asif Mammadov =

Azerbaijani footballer (born 1986)

Personal information
- Full name: Asif Huseyn oglu Mammadov
- Date of birth: 5 August 1986 (age 40)
- Place of birth: Aghdam, Azerbaijan
- Height: 1.72 m (5 ft 8 in)
- Position: Midfielder

Team information
- Current team: Gabala
- Number: 11

Senior career*
Years	Team	Apps	(Gls)
2004–2006	Adliyya Baku		
2006	MKT Araz	2	(0)
2007	Gabala	9	(3)
2007–2008	Standard Baku	18	(2)
2008–2010	Inter Baku	20	(1)
2010	Khazar Lankaran	8	(0)
2011–2015	Inter Baku	113	(9)
2015–	Gabala	200	(10)

International career^{‡}
2018	Azerbaijan	1	(0)
- * Club domestic league appearances and goals as of 27 October 2026 ‡ National team caps and goals as of 23 March 2018

Asif Mammadov (Azerbaijani: Asif Hüseyn oğlu Məmmədov; born on 5 August 1986) is an Azerbaijani professional footballer who plays for Gabala FK in the Azerbaijan Premier League.

== Career ==
=== Club ===
On 10 June 2015, Mammadov signed for Gabala. On 25 June 2024, Mammadov signed a new one-year contract with Gabala, keeping him at the club until the summer of 2025.

=== International ===
On 23 March 2018, Mammadov made his senior international debut for Azerbaijan game against Belarus.

== Career statistics ==
=== Club ===
As of match played 17 October 2026

Appearances and goals by club, season and competition
Club	Season	League			National Cup		Continental		Other		Total	
Club	Season	Division	Apps	Goals	Apps	Goals	Apps	Goals	Apps	Goals	Apps	Goals
Adliyya Baku	2004–05	Azerbaijan Top League	32	9			-		-		32	9
Adliyya Baku	2005-06	Azerbaijan First Division					-		-			
Adliyya Baku	Total		32	9			-	-	-	-	32	9
MKT Araz	2006–07	Azerbaijan Top League	2	0			–		–		2	0
Gabala	2006–07	Azerbaijan Top League	9	3	0	0	–		–		9	3
Standard Baku	2007–08	Azerbaijan Premier League	18	2			–		–		18	2
Inter Baku	2008–09	Azerbaijan Premier League	4	1			1	0	-		5	1
Inter Baku	2009–10	Azerbaijan Premier League	16	0		2	2	0	-		18	0
Inter Baku	Total		20	1		2	3	0	-	-	23	3
Khazar Lankaran	2010–11	Azerbaijan Premier League	8	0	1	0	0	0	–		9	0
Inter Baku	2010–11	Azerbaijan Premier League	9	0	5	0	0	0	-		14	0
Inter Baku	2011–12	Azerbaijan Premier League	28	0	3	0	-		-		31	0
Inter Baku	2012–13	Azerbaijan Premier League	31	3	3	1	4	1	-		38	5
Inter Baku	2013–14	Azerbaijan Premier League	24	2	2	2	2	1	-		28	5
Inter Baku	2014–15	Azerbaijan Premier League	21	4	2	1	4	0	-		27	5
Inter Baku	Total		113	9	15	4	10	2	-	-	138	15
Gabala	2015–16	Azerbaijan Premier League	19	2	4	1	3	1	-		26	4
Gabala	2016–17	Azerbaijan Premier League	20	2	4	1	12	0	-		36	3
Gabala	2017–18	Azerbaijan Premier League	22	2	4	0	3	0	-		29	2
Gabala	2018–19	Azerbaijan Premier League	22	1	3	0	2	0	-		27	1
Gabala	2019–20	Azerbaijan Premier League	13	0	1	0	2	0	-		16	0
Gabala	2020–21	Azerbaijan Premier League	25	2	3	0	-		-		28	2
Gabala	2021–22	Azerbaijan Premier League	22	1	5	1	-		-		27	2
Gabala	2022–23	Azerbaijan Premier League	30	0	3	0	2	0	-		35	0
Gabala	2023–24	Azerbaijan Premier League	15	0	4	0	0	0	-		19	0
Gabala	2024–25	Azerbaijan First League	11	0	0	0	-		-		11	0
Gabala	2025–26	Azerbaijan Premier League	0	0	0	0	-		-		0	0
Gabala	2026–27	Azerbaijan Premier League	1	0	0	0	-		-		1	0
Gabala	Total		200	10	31	3	24	1	-	-	255	14
Career total			402	33	47	9	37	3	-	-	486	46

=== International ===
Azerbaijan
Year	Apps	Goals
2018	1	0
Total	1	0

Statistics accurate as of match played 23 March 2018

== Honours ==
Gabala

- Azerbaijan Cup: 2018–19
