= Petar Zlatinov =

Bulgarian footballer

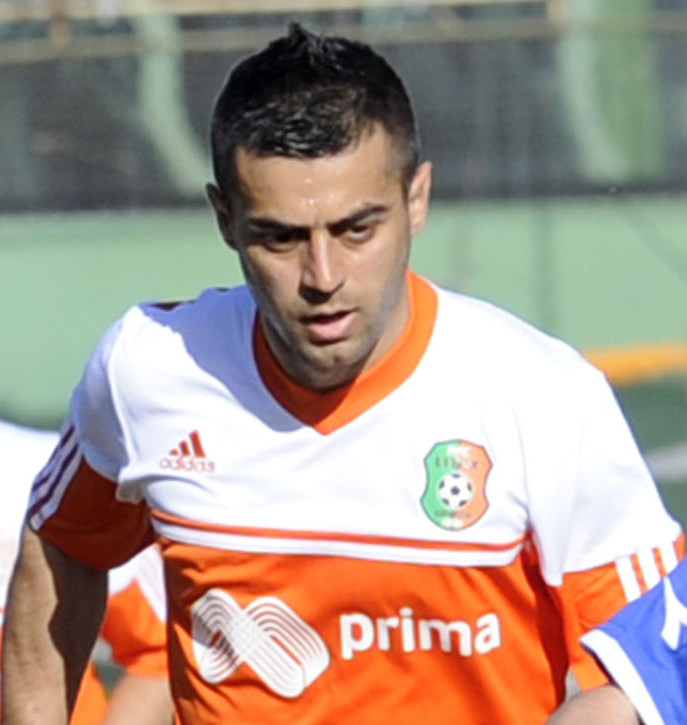

Personal information
- Date of birth: 13 March 1981 (age 45)
- Place of birth: Sandanski, Bulgaria
- Height: 1.79 m (5 ft 10 1/2 in)
- Positions: Central midfielder; winger

Youth career
- 1997–1999: Pirin Blagoevgrad
- 1999–2000: Vihren Sandanski

Senior career*
Years	Team	Apps	(Gls)
2000–2003	CSKA Sofia	24	(1)
2001	→ Cherno More (loan)	11	(0)
2003–2005	Dinamo Minsk	35	(7)
2005–2007	Litex Lovech	56	(9)
2008–2013	Inter Baku	107	(14)
2013–2014	Litex Lovech	30	(2)
2015	Cherno More	5	(2)
2016	Lokomotiv Mezdra	3	(0)
2016	Kariana		
2017–2018	Vihren		

International career
2002	Bulgaria U21	2	(0)

Managerial career
- 2017–2018: Vihren
- 2018–2019: Pirin Blagoevgrad
- 2021–2023: Vihren
- * Club domestic league appearances and goals as of 1 June 2016

Petar Zlatinov (Bulgarian: Петър Златинов; born 13 March 1981) is a Bulgarian former footballer who played as a midfielder.

== Career ==
In early 2000, at 18 years old, Zlatinov signed with CSKA Sofia.

On 1 April 2003, Zlatinov was loaned to Belarusian Premier League side Dinamo Minsk for a period of three months. On 23 April, he scored the only goal in a game against BATE Borisov in the Belarusian Cup to ensure Dinamo progressed to the semi-finals. He then played full 90 minutes in Dinamo's 2–0 defeat of Lokomotiv Minsk in the final on 24 May, and collected his first Belarusian Cup winners medal. In July 2003, Zlatinov moved permanently to Dinamo, winning the 2004 Belarusian Premier League title.

After success in Belarus, Zlatinov moved back to Bulgaria to play for Litex Lovech. In July 2005, he signed a 2+1 year contract. He made his league debut in a 0–2 home loss against Pirin Blagoevgrad on 6 August. His first goal for Litex came on 10 September, scoring the second in a 5–2 win over Cherno More Varna.

On 23 February 2008, Zlatinov joined Inter Baku. Media reports estimated the transfer fee to be around €165,000. He has signed a one-and-a-half-year contract. Zlatinov collected his first Azerbaijan Premier League title winner's medal at the end of the 2007–08 season. On 29 July 2008, he scored a late equalizer to secure a 1–1 home draw against Partizan Belgrade in the second qualifying round of the Champions League.

== Coaching career ==
On 5 July 2017, Zlatinov was appointed as player-manager of Vihren Sandanski.

On 20 June 2018, Zlatinov became manager of Second League club Pirin Blagoevgrad.

== Statistics ==
As of 10 April 2015

Professional club performance
Club	Season	League		Cup		Europe		Total	
Club	Season	Apps	Goals	Apps	Goals	Apps	Goals	Apps	Goals
Dinamo Minsk	2003	12	3	4	1	0	0	16	4
Dinamo Minsk	2004	14	4	1	0	2	0	17	4
Dinamo Minsk	2005	9	0	0	0	0	0	9	0
Dinamo Total		35	7	5	1	2	0	42	8
Litex Lovech	2005–06	27	4	0	0	10	0	37	4
Litex Lovech	2006–07	24	5	0	0	4	1	28	6
Litex Lovech	2007–08	5	0	0	0	1	0	6	0
Litex Total		56	9	0	0	15	1	71	10
Inter Baku	2007–08	10	4	0	0	0	0	10	4
Inter Baku	2008–09	14	2	0	0	4	1	18	3
Inter Baku	2009–10	29	6	3	0	2	0	34	6
Inter Baku	2010–11	24	2	3	0	2	0	29	2
Inter Baku	2011–12	30	0	3	0	–	–	33	0
Inter Baku	2012–13	0	0	0	0	2	0	2	0
Inter Total		107	14	9	0	10	1	126	15
Litex Lovech	2013–14	27	1	3	2	–	–	30	3
Litex Lovech	2014–15	3	1	2	0	3	0	8	1
Litex Total		30	2	5	2	3	0	38	4
Cherno More	2014–15	5	2	2	0	0	0	7	2
Cherno More Total		5	2	2	0	0	0	7	2

== Honours ==
=== CSKA Sofia ===
- Bulgarian Cup (1): 2002

=== Dinamo Minsk ===
- Belarusian Cup (1): 2003
- Belarusian Premier League (1): 2004

=== Inter Baku ===
- Azerbaijan Premier League (2): 2007–08, 2009–10
- CIS Cup (1): 2011
