= Lubomír Kubica =

Czech footballer

Personal information
- Full name: Lubomír Kubica
- Date of birth: 10 March 1979 (age 47)
- Place of birth: Hranice, Czechoslovakia
- Height: 1.84 m (6 ft 0 in)
- Positions: Central defender; holding midfielder

Senior career*
Years	Team	Apps	(Gls)
1999–2002	Baník Ostrava	24	(0)
2000–2001	→ Drnovice (loan)	11	(0)
2002–2004	Drnovice		
2004–2006	Irtysh Pavlodar		
2006–2007	AS Trenčín		
2007–2008	Maribor	42	(0)
2009	Ashdod	10	(1)
2009–2010	Inter Baku	18	(0)
2010–2014	Tescoma Zlín	58	(2)

International career^{‡}
2000–2002	Czech Republic U-21	14	(0)
- * Club domestic league appearances and goals as of 16 September 2014 ‡ National team caps and goals as of 26 September 2011

Lubomír Kubica (born 10 March 1979) is a Czech association footballer who last played for Tescoma Zlín in the Czech 2. Liga.

== Club career ==
Kubica previously played for Baník Ostrava, Drnovice in the Czech Gambrinus liga, Irtysh Pavlodar in Kazakhstan, AS Trenčín in the Slovak Corgoň liga, for Maribor in the Slovenian Prva Liga Telekom Slovenije, for Ashdod in the Israeli Premier League and Inter Baku in the Azerbaijan Premier League.
