= Sergei Yegorov (footballer, born 1983) =

Russian footballer

Personal information
- Full name: Sergei Gennadyevich Yegorov
- Date of birth: 26 October 1983 (age 43)
- Place of birth: Borovichi, Novgorod Oblast, Russian SFSR
- Height: 1.75 m (5 ft 9 in)
- Position: Midfielder

Senior career*
Years	Team	Apps	(Gls)
2001	FC Oazis Yartsevo	15	(0)
2002	FC Spartak Shchyolkovo	0	(0)
2002–2003	FC Arsenal Tula	8	(1)
2004	FC Lokomotiv Chita	1	(0)
2004–2005	FC Torpedo Vladimir	39	(8)
2006–2007	FC Ural Sverdlovsk Oblast	52	(4)
2008	FC Metallurg-Kuzbass Novokuznetsk	40	(6)
2009	FC Baltika Kaliningrad	33	(4)
2010	FC Luch-Energiya Vladivostok	34	(5)
2011	FC Fakel Voronezh	16	(0)
2012–2013	FC Metallurg-Kuzbass Novokuznetsk	23	(6)
2013	FC Petrotrest St. Petersburg	9	(1)
2013–2014	FC Dynamo Saint Petersburg	23	(2)
2014	FC Zenit Penza	20	(1)
2015	FC Zenit-Izhevsk	6	(0)
2015–2016	FC Pskov-747 Pskov	13	(1)
- * Club domestic league appearances and goals

Sergei Gennadyevich Yegorov (Russian: Серге́й Геннадьевич Егоров; born 26 October 1983) is a former Russian professional football player.

== Club career ==
He played 9 seasons in the Russian Football National League for 7 different clubs.
