= Igor Súkenník =

Slovak footballer

Personal information
- Date of birth: 25 October 1989 (age 37)
- Place of birth: Trnava, Czechoslovakia
- Positions: Attacking midfielder; winger

Team information
- Current team: Viktoria Žižkov
- Number: 14

Youth career
- Spartak Trnava

Senior career*
Years	Team	Apps	(Gls)
2008–2010	Spartak Trnava	26	(0)
2010–2011	Viktoria Žižkov	21	(2)
2012	Třinec	8	(1)
2013–2015	Viktoria Žižkov	56	(10)
2015–2016	Hradec Králové	17	(2)
2016–2017	Slovan Liberec	5	(1)
2017–2018	Hradec Králové	13	(0)
2018–2019	Vítkovice	12	(1)
2019–	Viktoria Žižkov	1	(0)
- * Club domestic league appearances and goals as of 4 March 2019

Igor Súkenník (born 25 October 1989) is a Slovak football player who plays for Viktoria Žižkov.
