= Svilen Simeonov =

Bulgarian footballer

Personal information
- Full name: Svilen Marinov Simeonov
- Date of birth: 8 October 1974 (age 52)
- Place of birth: Dobrich, Bulgaria
- Height: 1.84 m (6 ft 1/2 in)
- Position: Goalkeeper

Youth career
- Dobrudzha Dobrich

Senior career*
Years	Team	Apps	(Gls)
1994–2000	Dobrudzha Dobrich	93	(0)
2000–2007	Naftex Burgas	88	(0)
2007–2009	Inter Baku	21	(0)
2009	Spartak Varna	11	(0)
2010	Nesebar	13	(0)
2010–2011	Neftochimic 1986	?	(?)
- * Club domestic league appearances and goals

Svilen Marinov Simeonov (Bulgarian: Свилен Маринов Симеонов; born 8 October 1974) is a former Bulgarian football player, who played as a goalkeeper.
