= Cleiton (footballer, born 1979) =

Brazilian footballer

Personal information
- Full name: Cleiton Oliveira Pinto
- Date of birth: 21 December 1979 (age 46)
- Place of birth: Barreiras, Brazil
- Height: 1.78 m (5 ft 10 in)
- Position: Midfielder

Youth career
- Goiânia

Senior career*
Years	Team	Apps	(Gls)
2000–2001	Goiânia		
2001	Al-Arabi		
2002	Goiatuba		
2002	Caldas Esporte Clube		
2003–2004	Vila Nova		
2005–	Grêmio Inhumense		
2005	→ Rio Ave (loan)	22	(3)
2006–2007	→ Estrela da Amadora (loan)	6	(0)
2007–2008	→ Santa Clara (loan)	26	(2)
2008–2010	ASA	27	(3)
2008–2009	→ Inter Baku (loan)	6	(0)
2011	Fortaleza	17	(4)
2011–2014	Anapolina		
- * Club domestic league appearances and goals as of 9 August 2017 ‡ National team caps and goals as of 24 October 2013

Cleiton Oliveira Pinto (born 21 December 1979), commonly known as Cleiton, is a retired Brazilian footballer who played as a midfielder.

== Azerbaijan Career statistics ==
Club performance			League		Cup		Continental		Total	
Season	Club	League	Apps	Goals	Apps	Goals	Apps	Goals	Apps	Goals
Azerbaijan			League		Azerbaijan Cup		Europe		Total	
2008-09	Inter Baku	Azerbaijan Premier League	6	0			-		6	0
Total	Azerbaijan		6	0			0	0	6	0
Career total			6	0			0	0	6	0
