= Salyan Olympic Sport Complex Stadium =

Multi-purpose stadium in Salyan, Azerbaijan

Salyan Olimpiya Kompleksinin Stadionu
- Interactive map of Salyan Olimpiya Kompleksinin Stadionu
- Location: Salyan, Azerbaijan
- Capacity: 2,000
- Surface: Grass

Construction
- Built: 2007; 19 years ago

Tenant
- FK Mughan

Salyan Olympic Sport Complex Stadium is located in Salyan, Azerbaijan. It is used by FK Mughan and has a seating capacity of 2000 spectators.

== See also ==
- List of football stadiums in Azerbaijan
