= Danildo Accioly =

Brazilian footballer (born 1981)

Personal information
- Full name: Danildo José São Pedro Accioly Filho
- Date of birth: 30 March 1981 (age 45)
- Place of birth: Salvador, Brazil
- Height: 1.85 m (6 ft 1 in)
- Position: Centre-back

Team information
- Current team: Santa Clara (assistant)

Youth career
- Vitória
- 1997–2001: Bahia

Senior career*
Years	Team	Apps	(Gls)
1999–2004	Bahia	18	(2)
2004	Portuguesa		
2005	ABC		
2005	Vila Nova	13	(0)
2006	Portuguesa Santista		
2006	ABC		
2006–2008	Santa Clara	57	(3)
2008–2012	Inter Baku	81	(6)
2012–2019	Santa Clara	225	(10)

Managerial career
- 2019–: Santa Clara (assistant)
- 2023: Santa Clara (caretaker)
- * Club domestic league appearances and goals

Danildo José São Pedro Accioly Filho (born 30 March 1981), known as Accioly, is a Brazilian former professional footballer who played as a central defender. He is currently assistant manager of Primeira Liga club Santa Clara.

He spent the better part of his 20-year senior career with Portuguese club Santa Clara, competing mainly in the Segunda Liga (270 matches).

== Club career ==
Born in Salvador, Bahia, Accioly was a youth graduate of hometown side Esporte Clube Bahia. He was promoted to the first team in 1999, and suffered relegation from the Série A in 2003 as dead last. On 13 April 2004, he signed for Série B team Associação Portuguesa de Desportos.

After failing to impress, Accioly subsequently represented ABC Futebol Clube (two stints), Vila Nova Futebol Clube and Associação Atlética Portuguesa before moving abroad in 2006 and joining Portuguese club C.D. Santa Clara. He made his debut in the Segunda Liga on 27 August that year, playing the full 90 minutes in a 1–0 away win against Portimonense S.C. and being booked in the process.

In 2008, Accioly moved to the Azerbaijan Premier League with FC Inter Baku. In July 2009, he appeared in both legs of the UEFA Europa League's first qualifying round against FC Spartak Trnava (5–2 aggregate loss).

Accioly returned to Azores' Santa Clara in the 2012 off-season. He achieved promotion to the Primeira Liga at the end of the 2017–18 campaign, contributing 17 matches to the feat.

On 12 August 2018, aged 37, Accioly made his debut in the Portuguese top division by playing the entire 1–0 away defeat to C.S. Marítimo. He was the oldest player in the league that season, and became the club's assistant manager at its conclusion.

Accioly was named interim manager of Santa Clara when Mário Silva was sacked on 6 January 2023, though Jorge Simão was hired before he could lead them in a match. When the latter was dismissed after no wins and two draws from seven games on 26 February, the Brazilian was put in charge until the end of the campaign. On his debut a week later, the team lost 3–1 at home to Vitória de Guimarães.

Following relegation as last, Accioly returned to his position as assistant.

== Career statistics ==
As of match played 14 May 2016

Appearances and goals by club, season and competition
Club	Season	League			National Cup		League Cup		Continental		Total	
Club	Season	Division	Apps	Goals	Apps	Goals	Apps	Goals	Apps	Goals	Apps	Goals
Inter Baku	2008–09	Azerbaijan Premier League	20	3			-		-		20	3
Inter Baku	2009–10	Azerbaijan Premier League	24	0	2	0	-		2	0	28	0
Inter Baku	2010–11	Azerbaijan Premier League	24	2	2	0	-		1	0	27	2
Inter Baku	2011–12	Azerbaijan Premier League	13	1	0	0	-		-		13	1
Inter Baku	Total		81	6	4	0	-	-	3	0	88	6
Santa Clara	2012–13	LigaPro	39	3	0	0	3	1	-		42	4
Santa Clara	2013–14	LigaPro	39	2	0	0	4	0	-		43	2
Santa Clara	2014–15	LigaPro	41	1	0	0	3	0	-		44	1
Santa Clara	2015–16	LigaPro	42	3	0	0	0	0	-		42	3
Santa Clara	Total		161	9	0	0	10	1	0	0	171	10
Career total			244	15	4	0	10	1	3	0	259	16

== Managerial statistics ==
As of match played 29 July 2023

Managerial record by team and tenure
Team	From	To	Record				
Team	From	To	G	W	D	L	Win %
Santa Clara (caretaker)	26 February 2023	1 June 2023	14	2	2	10	14.29
Total			14	2	2	10	14.29

== Honours ==
ABC

- Campeonato Potiguar: 2005
- Copa RN: 2005
