= ASK Arena =

Football stadium in Baku, Azerbaijan

Coordinates: 40.4110°N 49.8977°E

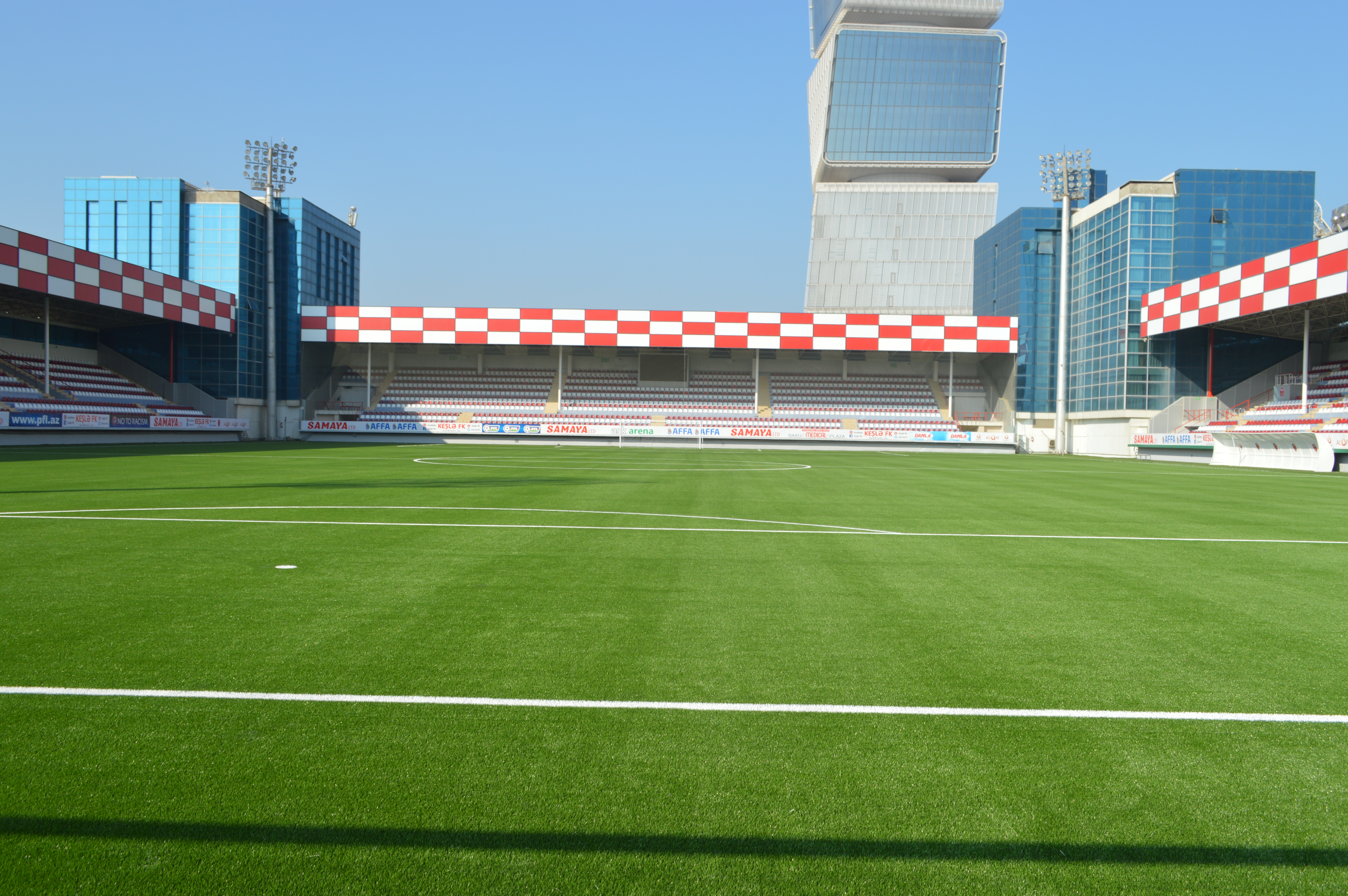
- Interactive map of ASK Arena
- Location: Baku, Azerbaijan
- Owner: ASK
- Capacity: 8,300
- Surface: Artificial

Construction
- Built: 2001

ASK Arena (Azerbaijani: ASK Arena), formerly Inter Arena and Shafa Stadium is an all-seater football stadium located in Baku . The stadium was built on the site of Termist stadium in 2001 and has a capacity of 8,125 spectators. The stadium surrounded by practice fields, administration buildings and four-star hotel.

== Background ==
ASK Arena was built by AFFA in 2001. The first match played was a 2001–02 UEFA Cup first qualifying round between Shafa Baku and Olimija Ljubljana where the match ended 0–4. The first goal scored by Dušan Kosič.

The stadium was one of the venues for the group stages of the 2012 FIFA U-17 Women's World Cup. A Group A match were played there.

In July 2014, it was announced that stadium will change its name to Inter-Arena after Keşla FK (whose former name was "Inter Baku") loaned stadium for long-term from AFFA.

As the stadium changed its owner, in July 2018 it was renamed again into ASK Arena (which means Azerbaijan Industrial Corporation) for sponsorship reasons.

== Transport ==
Keshla station of Baku suburban railway.

Koroğlu (Baku Metro), Ulduz (Baku Metro). The M9 Metro Station is planned in this area by Baku Metro in the future.

== Azerbaijan national football team matches ==
The following national team matches were held in the stadium.

Date	Time (CEST)	Team #1	Res.	Team #2	Round	Attendance
5 September 2001	19:00	Azerbaijan	1–1	(North Macedonia) Macedonia	2002 FIFA World Cup qualifying	4,100
11 June 2003	20:00	Azerbaijan	2–1	Serbia and Montenegro	UEFA Euro 2004 qualifying	1,500
6 September 2003	19:00	Azerbaijan	1–2	Finland	UEFA Euro 2004 qualifying	6,500
