= Bronislav Červenka =

Czech footballer

Personal information
- Date of birth: 27 September 1975 (age 51)
- Place of birth: Luhačovice, Czechoslovakia
- Height: 1.82 m (6 ft 0 in)
- Position: Midfielder

Team information
- Current team: Zbrojovka Brno (assistant)

Senior career*
Years	Team	Apps	(Gls)
1994–1996	Uherské Hradiště	50	(2)
1996–2000	Drnovice	107	(15)
2001–2002	Baník Ostrava	33	(3)
2002–2007	Zlín	114	(5)
2007–2012	Inter Baku	129	(7)
2012–2013	Zlín	25	(0)
2013–2015	Spartak Hulín		

International career
1997	Czech Republic U21	2	(0)

Managerial career
- 2014–2017: Zlín (assistant)
- 2015–2016: Zlín B
- 2017–2018: Baník Ostrava (assistant)
- 2018–2023: Kroměříž
- 2023–2026: Zlín
- 2026–: Zbrojovka Brno (assistant)
- * Club domestic league appearances and goals

Bronislav Červenka (born 27 September 1975) is a Czech football manager and former player.

== Playing career ==
A midfielder, Červenka played in the Czech First League for clubs including Uherské Hradiště, Drnovice, Baník Ostrava, and Zlín at the start of his career. With Drnovice he reached the final of the 1997–98 Czech Cup.

In 2007 he moved to Azerbaijan. While playing with Inter Baku in 2008, Červenka scored an equaliser for the club in their UEFA Champions League qualifier against FK Rabotnički. He made two appearances in the Champions League that season.

== Honours ==
=== Managerial ===
SK HS Kroměříž

- Moravian-Silesian Football League: 2022–23

FC Zlín

- Czech National Football League: 2024–25
