= Volodimir Levin =

Azerbaijani footballer (born 1984)

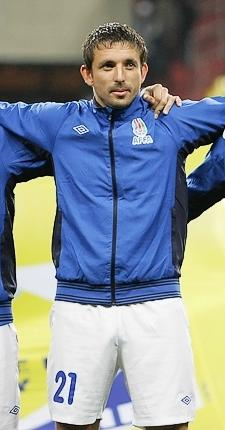
- With Azerbaijan in 2012

Personal information
- Date of birth: 23 January 1984 (age 42)
- Place of birth: Arkhangelsk, Russian SFSR
- Height: 1.87 m (6 ft 1 1/2 in)
- Position: Defender

Senior career*
Years	Team	Apps	(Gls)
2001–2004	Chornomorets-2 Odesa	52	(4)
2004–2013	Inter Baku	204	(11)
2013–2014	Gabala	26	(2)

International career^{‡}
2008–2013	Azerbaijan	28	(0)
- * Club domestic league appearances and goals as of 2 July 2015 ‡ National team caps and goals as of 16 October 2013

Volodimir Levin (born 23 January 1984) is an Azerbaijani professional footballer, who last played as a defender for Gabala and the Azerbaijan national team. He also holds Ukrainian citizenship.

In the summer of 2013 Levin signed with Gabala, having previously spent 9 seasons at Inter Baku after signing from Chornomorets-2 Odesa.

== Career statistics ==
=== Club ===
As of match played 10 August 2014

Club performance			League		Cup		Continental		Total	
Season	Club	League	Apps	Goals	Apps	Goals	Apps	Goals	Apps	Goals
Azerbaijan			League		Azerbaijan Cup		Europe		Total	
2004–05	Inter Baku	Azerbaijan Premier League	27	1			-		27	1
2005–06	Inter Baku	Azerbaijan Premier League	26	2			-		26	2
2006–07	Inter Baku	Azerbaijan Premier League	22	2			-		22	2
2007–08	Inter Baku	Azerbaijan Premier League	12	0			-		12	0
2008–09	Inter Baku	Azerbaijan Premier League	10	1			4	0	14	1
2009–10	Inter Baku	Azerbaijan Premier League	29	1			0	0	29	1
2010–11	Inter Baku	Azerbaijan Premier League	23	1	6	0	2	0	31	1
2011–12	Inter Baku	Azerbaijan Premier League	27	1	4	0	-		31	1
2012–13	Inter Baku	Azerbaijan Premier League	28	2	3	0	4	0	35	2
2013–14	Gabala	Azerbaijan Premier League	25	2	3	0	-		28	2
2014–15	Gabala	Azerbaijan Premier League	1	0	0	0	2	0	3	0
Total	Azerbaijan		230	15	16	0	12	0	258	15
Career total			230	15	16	0	12	0	258	15

=== International ===
As of 16 October 2013

Azerbaijan national team
Year	Apps	Goals
2008	1	0
2009	9	0
2010	5	0
2011	4	0
2012	5	0
2013	4	0
Total	28	0

== Honors ==
Inter Baku

- Azerbaijan Premier League (2): 2007–08, 2009–10
