= 2014–15 FC Inter Baku season =

Inter Baku
2014–15 season
- President: Jahangir Hajiyev
- Manager: Kakhaber Tskhadadze
- Stadium: Inter Arena
- Premier League: 2nd
- Azerbaijan Cup: Semifinal vs Neftchi Baku
- Europa League: Second Qualifying Round vs Elfsborg
- Top goalscorer: League: Mikel Álvaro (9); All: Bachana Tskhadadze (11)
- Highest home attendance: 3,420 vs Elfsborg; 24 July 2014
- Lowest home attendance: 200 vs AZAL; 7 December 2014
- Average home league attendance: 1,125; 29 May 2015
Home colours	Away colours

The Inter Baku 2014–15 season was Inter Baku's fourteenth Azerbaijan Premier League season, and their sixth season under manager Kakhaber Tskhadadze. They competed in the 2014–15 UEFA Europa League, entering at the first qualifying round stage, the Azerbaijan Cup and the Azerbaijan Premier League.

On 5 August 2014, the club changed the name of their stadium from Shafa Stadium to Inter Arena for sponsorship reasons.

== Squad ==
As of 2 February 2015

Note: Flags indicate national team as defined under FIFA eligibility rules; some limited exceptions apply. Players may hold more than one non-FIFA nationality.

No.	Pos.	Nation	Player
1	GK	GEO	Giorgi Lomaia
2	DF	AZE	Azer Salahli
3	DF	GEO	Lasha Salukvadze
4	DF	ESP	Iván Benítez
5	DF	GEO	Aleksandr Amisulashvili
6	MF	MKD	Slavčo Georgievski
7	MF	AZE	Abdulla Abatsiyev
8	MF	ESP	Mikel Álvaro
10	MF	AZE	Elvin Mammadov
11	MF	AZE	Asif Mammadov (captain)
12	FW	BRA	Nildo
13	MF	AZE	Mirsahib Abbasov
15	DF	FRA	Yohan Bocognano
17	MF	AZE	Magomed Mirzabekov
19	MF	PAR	César Meza
21	MF	AZE	Arif Dashdemirov

No.	Pos.	Nation	Player
22	MF	AZE	Afran Ismayilov
23	DF	SRB	Vojislav Stanković
24	MF	AZE	Fuad Bayramov
25	GK	AZE	Salahat Aghayev
27	MF	CRC	Diego Madrigal
28	FW	GEO	Bachana Tskhadadze
29	DF	AZE	Ruslan Cafarov
30	DF	AZE	Abbas Hüseynov
33	DF	CRO	Matija Špičić
80	MF	AZE	Nizami Hajiyev
82	MF	NED	Ruben Schaken
88	MF	PAR	David Meza
91	MF	AZE	Joshgun Diniyev
96	GK	AZE	Elshan Poladov
—	DF	AZE	Tural Hümbätov
—	MF	NED	Youssef Fennich

=== Out on loan ===
Note: Flags indicate national team as defined under FIFA eligibility rules; some limited exceptions apply. Players may hold more than one non-FIFA nationality.

No.	Pos.	Nation	Player
--	MF	AZE	Mirzaga Huseynpur (at Simurq)

== Transfers ==
=== Summer ===
In: Note: Flags indicate national team as defined under FIFA eligibility rules; some limited exceptions apply. Players may hold more than one non-FIFA nationality.

No.	Pos.	Nation	Player
5	DF	GEO	Aleksandr Amisulashvili (from (Russia) Krylia Sovetov)
9	MF	AZE	Mirzaga Huseynpur (from (Azerbaijan) Sumgayit)
10	MF	AZE	Elvin Mammadov (from (Azerbaijan) Baku)
12	FW	BRA	Nildo (from (Azerbaijan) Khazar Lankaran)
17	MF	AZE	Magomed Mirzabekov (from (Azerbaijan) Sumgayit)
80	MF	AZE	Nizami Hajiyev (from (Azerbaijan) Gabala)
—	MF	NED	Youssef Fennich (from (Netherlands) PEC Zwolle)
—	DF	BEL	Jelle De Bock (Trial)
—	FW	FRA	Omar Kossoko (Trial)

Out: Note: Flags indicate national team as defined under FIFA eligibility rules; some limited exceptions apply. Players may hold more than one non-FIFA nationality.

No.	Pos.	Nation	Player
6	MF	AZE	Samir Zargarov (to (Azerbaijan) Simurq)
7	DF	AZE	Ruslan Amirjanov (to (Azerbaijan) Gabala)
9	FW	GEO	Alexander Iashvili (Retired)
12	MF	CZE	Ivo Táborský (loan return to (Czech Republic) Teplice)
20	DF	CGO	Bruce Abdoulaye (to (France) US Orléans)
64	DF	AZE	Elhad Naziri (to (Azerbaijan) Araz-Naxçıvan)
70	FW	AZE	Vagif Javadov (to (Turkey) Gaziantep B.B.)
77	MF	BRA	Flávio (to (Montenegro) Budućnost Podgorica)
87	DF	AZE	Jamal Hajiyev (to (Azerbaijan) Sumgayit)
—	MF	AZE	Asif Mirili (from (Azerbaijan) Inter Baku)

=== Winter ===
In: Note: Flags indicate national team as defined under FIFA eligibility rules; some limited exceptions apply. Players may hold more than one non-FIFA nationality.

No.	Pos.	Nation	Player
22	MF	AZE	Afran Ismayilov (from (Azerbaijan) Khazar Lankaran)
23	DF	SRB	Vojislav Stanković (from (Serbia) Partizan)
82	MF	NED	Ruben Schaken (from (Netherlands) Feyenoord)
—	DF	AZE	Tural Hümbätov (from (Azerbaijan) Araz-Naxçıvan)

Out: Note: Flags indicate national team as defined under FIFA eligibility rules; some limited exceptions apply. Players may hold more than one non-FIFA nationality.

No.	Pos.	Nation	Player
9	MF	AZE	Mirzaga Huseynpur (loan to (Azerbaijan) Simurq)
14	DF	AZE	Ilgar Alakbarov (to (Azerbaijan) Khazar Lankaran)

== Friendlies ==
19 June 2014	Sturm Graz (Austria)	2 – 3	(Azerbaijan) Inter Baku	Austria
21:30 AZST (UTC+5)	Berić 22'; Gruber 77'	[ Report]	Amisulashvili 13'; Todorovski 19' (o.g.); Bocognano 33'

19 July 2014	Spartak Varna (Bulgaria)	0 – 5	(Azerbaijan) Inter Baku	Bulgaria
		Report	U.İbazadə; I.Sadıqov; M.Abbasov

23 July 2014	Suvorovo (Bulgaria)	3 – 1	(Azerbaijan) Inter Baku	Bulgaria
		Report

26 July 2014	Novi Pazar (Serbia)	1 – 1	(Azerbaijan) Inter Baku	Bulgaria
		Report	I.Sadıqov

3 August 2014	Inter Baku	2 – 0	AZAL	Baku
AZST (UTC+5)	Tskhadadze 5'; A.Mammadov 82'	Report		Stadium: Shafa Stadium

8 January 2015	İnegölspor (Turkey)	1 – 4	(Azerbaijan) Inter Baku	Antalya, Turkey
19:00 AZT (UTC+4)	Goal	Report	Hajiyev; Ismayilov; Bocognano (.); A.Mammadov

13 January 2015	Energie Cottbus (Germany)	1 – 1	(Azerbaijan) Inter Baku	Belek, Turkey
	Elsner 17' (pen.)	Report	Hajiyev 4'; Salukvadze (red card)

14 January 2015	Kairat (Kazakhstan)	1 – 3	(Azerbaijan) Inter Baku	Antalya, Turkey
	Gohou	Report	Hajiyev; Madrigal; Álvaro

17 January 2015	Kasımpaşa (Turkey)	1 – 3	(Azerbaijan) Inter Baku	Belek, Turkey
	Goal	Report	Nildo 10'; Mirzabekov 28'; Mammadov 83'

20 January 2015	Metalist Kharkiv (Ukraine)	1 – 1	(Azerbaijan) Inter Baku	Belek, Turkey
	Bobko 25'	Report	Bocognano 31'

23 January 2015	Jeju United (South Korea)	3 – 4	(Azerbaijan) Inter Baku	Belek, Turkey
	Goal	Report	Tskhadadze; D.Meza; Hajiyev

== Competitions ==
=== Azerbaijan Premier League ===
==== Results summary ====
Overall								Home						Away					
Pld	W	D	L	GF	GA	GD	Pts	W	D	L	GF	GA	GD	W	D	L	GF	GA	GD
32	17	12	3	54	19	+35	63	12	3	1	39	7	+32	5	9	2	15	12	+3

Last updated: 29 May 2015.
Source: Soccerway

==== Results ====
9 August 2014 1	Inter Baku	4 – 0	Gabala	Baku
20:00 AZST (UTC+5)	Amisulashvili 9'; Álvaro 15', 71'; Mirzabekov 19'; Bocognano (yellow card) 85'	Summary	Abışov (yellow card) 82'	Stadium: Inter Arena; Attendance: 1,000; Referee: Aliyar Ağayev

16 August 2014 2	Qarabağ	0 – 0	Inter Baku	Baku
21:00 AZST (UTC+5)	George (yellow card) 37'; N.Yusifov (yellow card) 54'	Summary	D.Meza (yellow card) 86'; Madrigal (yellow card) 90+4'	Stadium: Tofiq Bahramov Stadium^{1} Attendance: 1,500; Referee: Fariz Yusifov

24 August 2014 3	Inter Baku	5 – 1	Sumgayit	Baku
21:00 AZST (UTC+5)	Abatsiyev 8' (yellow card) 66'; Hajiyev 27'; D.Meza (yellow card) 44'; Álvaro 44', 90+2'; A.Mammadov 87'	Summary	T.Novruzov (yellow card) 30'; Kurbanov 40'; B.Hasanalizade (yellow card) 45'; Hüseynov (yellow card) 79'	Stadium: Inter Arena; Attendance: 500; Referee: Ramil Diniyev

29 August 2014 4	Khazar Lankaran	1 – 0	Inter Baku	Lankaran
20:00 AZST (UTC+5)	E.Abdullayev 5' (yellow card) 6'; Aliyev (yellow card) 34'; Ivanov (yellow card) 59'; Sadiqov (yellow card) 66'	Summary	D.Meza (yellow card) 16'	Stadium: Lankaran City Stadium; Attendance: 800; Referee: Aliyar Ağayev

12 September 2014 5	Araz-Naxçıvan	Annulled^{2}	Inter Baku	Nakhchivan
17:30 AZST (UTC+5)	Zubkov 81'	Summary	Tskhadadze 48'; J.Diniyev (yellow card) 56' (goal) 61'; Lomaia (yellow card) 57'; A.Mammadov 86'	Stadium: Nakhchivan City Stadium; Attendance: 7,100; Referee: Elvin Äsgärov

19 September 2014 6	Inter Baku	7 – 0	Baku	Baku
19:00 AZST (UTC+5)	Nildo 10', 19'; D.Meza (yellow card) 27'; Dashdemirov 30' (yellow card) 66'; Tskhadadze 44', 48'; J.Diniyev 73'; Hajiyev 85'	Summary		Stadium: Inter Arena; Attendance: 300; Referee: Rauf Jabbarov

27 September 2014 7	AZAL	1 – 1	Inter Baku	Baku
17:00 AZST (UTC+5)	K.Diniyev 4'; E.Yagublu (yellow card) 18'; Ramos (yellow card) 28'; Eduardo (yellow card) 32'; S.Rahimov (yellow card) 56'	Summary	Hajiyev (yellow card) 58'; J.Diniyev (yellow card) 73'; Álvaro 76'; Aghayev (yellow card) 81'; Dashdemirov (yellow card) 82'	Stadium: AZAL Arena; Attendance: 350; Referee: Elvin Äsgärov

18 October 2014 8	Inter Baku	0 – 0	Simurq	Baku
18:00 AZST (UTC+5)	Hajiyev (yellow card) 90+3'	Summary	Poljak (yellow card) 78'; Lambot (yellow card) 90+3'	Stadium: Inter Arena; Attendance: 600; Referee: Ingilab Mämmädov

26 October 2014 9	Neftchi Baku	0 – 0	Inter Baku	Baku
16:00 AZT (UTC+4)	Allahverdiyev (yellow card) 37'; Seyidov (yellow card) 38'; Yunuszade (yellow card) 69'	Summary	Nildo (yellow card) 80'	Stadium: Ismat Gayibov Stadium; Attendance: 300; Referee: Fariz Yusifov

29 October 2014 10	Inter Baku	0 – 0	Qarabağ	Baku
18:00 AZT (UTC+4)	D.Meza (yellow card) 35'	Summary		Stadium: Inter Arena; Attendance: 2,000; Referee: Aliyar Ağayev

2 November 2014 11	Sumgayit	0 – 0	Inter Baku	Sumqayit
16:00 AZT (UTC+4)	Chertoganov (yellow card) 43'	Summary	J.Diniyev (yellow card) 61'	Stadium: Kapital Bank Arena; Attendance: 1,500; Referee: Orkhan Mämmädov

20 November 2014 12	Inter Baku	3 – 1	Khazar Lankaran	Baku
18:00 AZT (UTC+4)	Nildo 10'; Álvaro 20', 74'; Aghayev (yellow card) 55'; D.Meza (yellow card) 61'	Summary	Vanderson (yellow card) 32'; Amirguliyev (yellow card) 45+3'; Thiego (yellow card) 89'; Fernando Gabriel 90+3'	Stadium: Inter Arena; Attendance: 1,000; Referee: Rahim Häsänov

28 November 2014 13	Baku	0 – 1	Inter Baku	Baku
14:00 AZT (UTC+4)	A.Guliyev (yellow card) 31'; Ristović (yellow card) 40'	Summary	Álvaro 39'; Lomaia (yellow card) 54'; Hajiyev (yellow card) 71'	Stadium: Tofik Bakhramov Stadium; Attendance: 200; Referee: Elvin Äsgärov

7 December 2014 15	Inter Baku	1 – 0	AZAL	Baku
17:15 AZT (UTC+4)	Nildo 68'; Amisulashvili (yellow card) 76'; Abatsiyev (yellow card) 90+4'	Summary	S.Rahimov (yellow card) 26'; V.Igbekoi (yellow card) 72'; N.Mammadov (yellow card) 82'	Stadium: Inter Arena; Attendance: 200; Referee: Rahim Häsänov

13 December 2014 16	Simurq	1 – 1	Inter Baku	Zaqatala
17:00 AZT (UTC+4)	Ćeran 43'; Stanojević (yellow card) 71'	Summary	Tskhadadze (yellow card) 26'; Nildo 90+2'	Stadium: Zaqatala City Stadium; Attendance: 1,500; Referee: Orkhan Mämmädov

18 December 2014 17	Inter Baku	2 – 1	Neftchi Baku	Baku
17:00 AZT (UTC+4)	Bocognano (yellow card) 32'; Nildo 63'; Mirzabekov 71'; Álvaro (yellow card) 87'	Summary	Canales 41'; Abdullayev (yellow card) 43'; Yunuszade (yellow card) 52'; Cardoso (yellow card) 74'; Seyidov (yellow card) 80'; Flavinho (yellow card) 90'; N.Gurbanov (yellow card) 90+1'	Stadium: Inter Arena; Attendance: 1,000; Referee: Aliyar Ağayev

21 December 2014 18	Gabala	1 – 1	Inter Baku	Qabala
15:00 AZT (UTC+4)	Ropotan (yellow card) 17'; Dodô 38'; Ehiosun (yellow card) 42'; R.Tagizade (yellow card) 66'; Nazirov (yellow card) 82'	Summary	Bocognano (yellow card) 42'; D.Meza (yellow card) 55'; Mirzabekov 67'; Mammadov (yellow card) 70' (yellow-red card) 87'; Lomaia (yellow card) 90+2'	Stadium: Gabala City Stadium; Attendance: 1,100; Referee: Fariz Yusifov

30 January 2015 19	Inter Baku	0 – 0	Sumgayit	Baku
16:00 AZT (UTC+4)	Bocognano (yellow card) 42'; Tskhadadze (yellow card) 60'	Summary	Fardjad-Azad (yellow card) 90+3'	Stadium: Inter Arena; Attendance: 400

7 February 2015 21	Khazar Lankaran	1 – 2	Inter Baku	Lankaran
17:00 AZT (UTC+4)	A.Babazadä (yellow card) 63'; E.Rzazadä (yellow card) 80'; F.Bayramov 83' (o.g.)	Summary	Mirzabekov 18'; Benítez (yellow card) 21'; Mammadov (yellow card) 27'; Špičić 59'	Stadium: Lankaran City Stadium; Attendance: 2,500; Referee: Elvin Äsgärov

10 February 2015 21	Araz-Naxçıvan	– ^{2}	Inter Baku	Nakhchivan
AZT (UTC+4)		[ Summary]		Stadium: Nakhchivan City Stadium

15 February 2015 22	Inter Baku	4 – 0	Baku	Baku
17:00 AZT (UTC+4)	Tskhadadze 4' (pen.); Ismayilov 7', 39'; F.Bayramov (yellow card) 45+1'; Nildo 52'	Summary	T.Gurbatov (yellow card) 3'	Stadium: Inter Arena; Attendance: 1,000; Referee: Vusal Äliyev

19 February 2015 23	AZAL	1 – 1	Inter Baku	Baku
15:00 AZT (UTC+4)	Mombongo-Dues 1'; N.Gurbanov (yellow card) 90+4'	Summary	Nildo 18'; Špičić (yellow card) 59'; Tskhadadze (yellow card) 90+4'	Stadium: AZAL Arena; Attendance: 250; Referee: Fariz Yusifov

28 February 2015 24	Inter Baku	2 – 1	Simurq	Baku
15:00 AZT (UTC+4)	Tskhadadze 18'; Mammadov 79'; Salukvadze (yellow card) 86'; D.Meza (yellow card) 88'; F.Bayramov (yellow card) 88'	Summary	Lambot (yellow card) 37'; V.Mustafayev (yellow card) 56'; Stanojević 87' (yellow card) 74' (yellow-red card) 88'	Stadium: Inter Arena; Attendance: 700; Referee: Aliyar Ağayev

8 March 2015 24	Neftchi Baku	0 – 2	Inter Baku	Baku
15:00 AZT (UTC+4)	Ramos (yellow card) 57'; Cardoso (yellow card) 60'; Flavinho (yellow card) 60'; Wobay (yellow card) 78'	Summary	M.Isayev 49' (o.g.); Salukvadze (yellow card) 54'; Aghayev (yellow card) 77'; Stanković (yellow card) 77'; A.Mammadov 87'	Stadium: Bakcell Arena; Attendance: 1,500; Referee: Fariz Yusifov

18 March 2015 26	Inter Baku	1 – 2	Gabala	Baku
18:00 AZT (UTC+4)	D.Meza (yellow card) 32'; Amisulashvili 75'; Stanković (yellow card) 90'	Summary	Gai 40' (yellow card) 64'; Abışov 90+1'	Stadium: Inter Arena; Attendance: 450; Referee: Aliyar Ağayev

2 April 2015 27	Qarabağ	0 – 0	Inter Baku	Baku
18:00 AZST (UTC+5)	Richard (yellow card) 11'; N.Yusifov (yellow card) 83'	Summary	Stanković (yellow card) 23'; E.Mammadov (yellow card) 73'	Stadium: Tofiq Bahramov Stadium^{1} Attendance: 1,500; Referee: Rahim Häsänov

5 April 2015 28	Inter Baku	2 – 0	Khazar Lankaran	Baku
18:00 AZST (UTC+5)	Mirzabekov (yellow card) 49'; D.Meza 53' (pen.); Stanković 76'	Summary	A.Ramazanov (yellow card) 52'; Scarlatache (yellow card) 60'	Stadium: Inter Arena; Attendance: 800; Referee: Omar Paşayev

8 April 2015 29	Inter Baku	– ^{2}	Araz-Naxçıvan	Baku
AZST (UTC+5)		[ Summary]		Stadium: Inter Arena

17 April 2015 30	Baku	1 – 2	Inter Baku	Baku
16:00 AZST (UTC+5)	N.Novruzov (yellow card) 23' (goal) 90+3'; E.Huseynov (yellow card) 59'; N.Gurbanov (yellow card) 63'	Summary	C.Meza 9', 55'; Mammadov (yellow card) 71'	Stadium: Tofik Bakhramov Stadium; Attendance: 200; Referee: Vusal Äliyev

25 April 2015 31	Inter Baku	2 – 0	AZAL	Baku
18:00 AZST (UTC+5)	J.Diniyev (yellow card) 35'; Dashdemirov 59', 76'	Summary	L.Kasradze (yellow card) 90+2'	Stadium: Inter Arena; Attendance: 300; Referee: Ramil Diniyev

1 May 2015 32	Simurq	2 – 3	Inter Baku	Zaqatala
17:00 AZST (UTC+5)	S.Zargarov 8'; V.Abdullayev 22'; Gökdemir (yellow card) 45+1'; Qirtimov (yellow card) 90+3'	Summary	Dashdemirov 2'; Álvaro 37'; D.Meza (yellow card) 41'; C.Meza 43' (yellow card) 56'	Stadium: Zaqatala City Stadium; Attendance: 1,000; Referee: Fariz Yusifov

8 May 2015 33	Inter Baku	4 – 0	Neftchi Baku	Baku
20:00 AZST (UTC+5)	J.Diniyev (yellow card) 37'; Tskhadadze 45', 55'; Meza 49'; Aghayev (red card) 65' Mammadov 90+1'	Summary	Ramos (yellow card) 59'; Seyidov (red card) 90'	Stadium: Inter Arena; Attendance: 1,500; Referee: Ingilab Mämmädov

16 May 2015 34	Gabala	1 – 1	Inter Baku	Qabala
20:00 AZST (UTC+5)	Gai 5'; Sadiqov (yellow card) 74'	Summary	A.Mammadov 27'; Amisulashvili (yellow card) 53'; D.Meza (yellow card) 75'	Stadium: Gabala City Stadium; Attendance: 3,000; Referee: Fariz Yusifov

22 May 2015 34	Inter Baku	2 – 1	Qarabağ	Baku
18:00 AZST (UTC+5)	Ismayilov 19'; Dashdemirov 56'; Tskhadadze (yellow card) 76'; Lomaia (yellow card) 90+1'	Summary	Sadygov (yellow card) 28'; George 30'; Reynaldo (yellow card) 42'; Garayev (yellow card) 49'	Stadium: Inter Arena; Attendance: 1,700; Referee: Ingilab Mämmädov

28 May 2015 36	Sumgayit	3 – 1	Inter Baku	Sumqayit
19:00 AZST (UTC+5)	J.Hajiyev (yellow card) 15'; Fardjad-Azad 37'; B.Hasanalizade (yellow card) 43'; Kurbanov 45', 67'; Hüseynov (yellow card) 63'	Summary	I.Sadıqov 7'	Stadium: Kapital Bank Arena; Attendance: 1,500; Referee: Ravan Hämzäzadä

==== League table ====
Pos	Team	Pld	W	D	L	GF	GA	GD	Pts	Qualification
1	Qarabağ (C)	32	20	8	4	51	28	+23	68	Qualification for Champions League second qualifying round
2	Inter Baku	32	17	12	3	55	20	+35	63	Qualification for Europa League first qualifying round
3	Gabala	32	15	9	8	46	35	+11	54	Qualification for Europa League first qualifying round
4	Neftchi Baku	32	13	10	9	38	33	+5	49	Qualification for Europa League first qualifying round
5	Simurq	32	11	6	15	41	39	+2	39	
6	AZAL	32	10	9	13	37	42	−5	39	
7	Khazar Lankaran	32	8	8	16	35	46	−11	32	
8	Sumgayit	32	7	10	15	32	43	−11	31	
9	Baku	32	3	8	21	19	68	−49	17	Relegation to the Azerbaijan First Division
10	Araz-Naxçıvan (Note: Araz-Naxçıvan were officially withdrawn from the league on 17 November 2014)	0	0	0	0	0	0	0	0	Team withdrawn

Source: uefa.com
Rules for classification: 1) points; 2) head-to-head points; 3) head-to-head goal difference; 4) head-to-head goals scored; 5. head-to-head away goals (only if 2 teams are tied); 6) goal difference; 7) goals scored.
(C) Champions

=== Azerbaijan Cup ===
3 December 2014 Second Round	Shahdag Qusar	0 – 3	Inter Baku	Qusar
18:00 AZT (UTC+4)	D.Yusupov (yellow card) 64'	Summary	Tskhadadze 11' (pen.); Mammadov 40'; M.Abbasov 90'	Stadium: Shovkat Ordukhanov Stadium; Attendance: 200

4 March 2015 Quarterfinal 1st leg	Inter Baku	2 – 0	Khazar Lankaran	Baku
17:00 AZT (UTC+4)	D.Meza (yellow card) 38'; Álvaro 41'; Sankoh 69' (o.g.); Dashdemirov (yellow card) 73'; Salukvadze (yellow card) 77'	Summary	E.Mirzäyev (yellow card) 29'; S.Tounkara (yellow card) 72'	Stadium: Inter Arena; Attendance: 1,000; Referee: Orkhan Mämmädov

13 March 2015 Quarterfinal 2nd leg	Khazar Lankaran	0 – 3 (0 – 5 agg.)	Inter Baku	Lankaran
17:00 AZT (UTC+4)	Sankoh (yellow card) 14'	Summary	A.Mammadov 22'; J.Diniyev (yellow card) 32'; Aghayev (yellow card) 34'; Dashdemirov 74'; Nildo (yellow card) 87'; Ismayilov 90+1'	Stadium: Lankaran City Stadium; Attendance: 1,000; Referee: Rahim Häsänov

13 April 2015 Semifinal 1st leg	Neftchi Baku	2 – 0	Inter Baku	Baku
19:00 AZST (UTC+5)	Yunuszade (yellow card) 12'; Canales 19', 71'; Seyidov (yellow card) 62'	Summary	J.Diniyev (yellow card) 8'; Aghayev (yellow card) 20'	Stadium: Bakcell Arena; Attendance: 1,500; Referee: Ingilab Mämmädov

21 April 2015 Semifinal 2nd leg	Inter Baku	2 – 1 (2 – 3 agg.)	Neftchi Baku	Baku
19:00 AZST (UTC+5)	Abatsiyev (yellow card) 17'; Dashdemirov 37'; D.Meza (yellow card) 45+1'; Tskhadadze 57'	Summary	E.Mehdiyev (yellow card) 19'; Canales 27'; Ramos (yellow card) 57'; A.Guliyev (yellow card) 82'; Abdullayev (yellow card) 90+3'	Stadium: Inter Arena; Attendance: 1,500; Referee: Elvin Äsgärov

=== UEFA Europa League ===
==== Qualifying rounds ====
3 July 2014 First qualifying round 1st leg	FC Tiraspol (Moldova)	2 – 3	(Azerbaijan) Inter Baku	Tiraspol, Moldova
22:00 AZST (UTC+5)	L.Japaridze (yellow card) 34'; Novicov 78' (yellow card) 90+2'; Karaneychev 88'	Report	Tskhadadze 8' (pen.); E. Mammadov 10'; Amisulashvili (yellow card) 50'; Novicov 71' (o.g.); D.Meza (yellow card) 77'; Georgievski (yellow card) 80'; Lomaia (yellow card) 90+1'	Stadium: Sheriff Stadium; Attendance: 2,223; Referee: Ante Vučemilović-Šimunović Jr. (Croatia)

10 July 2014 First qualifying round 2nd leg	Inter Baku (Azerbaijan)	3 – 1 (6 – 3 agg.)	(Moldova) FC Tiraspol	Baku, Azerbaijan
21:00 AZST (UTC+5)	A.Mammadov (yellow card) 15'; Dashdemirov 79'; Tskhadadze 83' (pen.); Mirzaga Huseynpur 90+1'	Report	Bulat 6'; S.Shapoval (yellow card) 46'; Karaneychev (yellow card) 55'; Vidović (yellow card) 66'; Georgiev (red card) 76'; L.Japaridze (red card) 83'	Stadium: Shafa Stadium; Attendance: 3,120; Referee: Marios Panayi (Cyprus)

17 July 2014 Second qualifying round 1st leg	Elfsborg (Sweden)	0 – 1	(Azerbaijan) Inter Baku	Borås, Sweden
22:00 AZST (UTC+5)	Claesson (yellow card) 40'; Svensson (yellow card) 44'; Jönsson (yellow card) 53'; Klarström (yellow card) 53'; Larsson (yellow card) 81'	Report	D.Meza (yellow card) 12'; Georgievski 29'; Špičić (yellow card) 49'	Stadium: Borås Arena; Referee: Davide Massa (Italy)

24 July 2014 Second qualifying round 2nd leg	Inter Baku (Azerbaijan)	0 – 1 (1 – 1 agg.) (3 – 4 p)	(Sweden) Elfsborg	Baku, Azerbaijan
21:00 AZST (UTC+5)	Salukvadze (red card) 4'; Madrigal (yellow card) 14'; Bocognano (yellow card) 94'; Lomaia (yellow card) 115'; Álvaro (yellow card) 116'	Report	Svensson (yellow card) 23'; Holmén 45+2'; Hauger (yellow card) 67'	Stadium: Shafa Stadium; Attendance: 3,420; Referee: Stanislav Todorov (Bulgaria)
	Penalties
	Álvaro (penalty missed); Amisulashvili (penalty scored); C.Meza (penalty scored); Špičić (penalty missed); Bocognano (penalty scored); Dashdemirov (penalty missed)		Prodell (penalty scored); Rohdén (penalty scored); Nilsson (penalty missed); Mobaeck (penalty missed); Beckmann (penalty scored); Holmén (penalty scored)

== Squad statistics ==
As of Match played 28 May 2015

=== Appearances and goals ===
No.	Pos	Nat	Player	Total		Premier League		Azerbaijan Cup		Europa League	
No.	Pos	Nat	Player	Apps	Goals	Apps	Goals	Apps	Goals	Apps	Goals
1	GK	(Georgia (country)) GEO	Giorgi Lomaia	9	0	4	0	1	0	4	0
3	DF	(Georgia (country)) GEO	Lasha Salukvadze	34	0	27	0	3	0	4	0
4	DF	(Spain) ESP	Iván Benítez	7	0	2+3	0	0	0	0+2	0
5	DF	(Georgia (country)) GEO	Aleksandr Amisulashvili	27	2	23	2	0	0	4	0
6	MF	(North Macedonia) MKD	Slavčo Georgievski	6	1	1	0	1	0	4	1
7	MF	(Azerbaijan) AZE	Abdulla Abatsiyev	17	1	8+7	1	2	0	0	0
8	MF	(Spain) ESP	Mikel Álvaro	36	10	22+7	9	3	1	3+1	0
10	MF	(Azerbaijan) AZE	Elvin Mammadov	30	4	15+10	2	4	1	1	1
11	MF	(Azerbaijan) AZE	Asif Mammadov	27	5	9+12	4	1+1	1	2+2	0
12	FW	(Brazil) BRA	Nildo	24	8	17+5	8	0+2	0	0	0
13	MF	(Azerbaijan) AZE	Mirsahib Abbasov	3	1	1+1	0	0+1	1	0	0
14	MF	(Azerbaijan) AZE	Mähämmäd Mähämmädov	1	0	0+1	0	0	0	0	0
15	DF	(France) FRA	Yohan Bocognano	30	0	15+6	0	5	0	4	0
17	MF	(Azerbaijan) AZE	Magomed Mirzabekov	33	4	29+1	4	3	0	0	0
18	DF	(Azerbaijan) AZE	Mänsur Nähavändi	1	0	1	0	0	0	0	0
19	MF	(Paraguay) PAR	César Meza	12	3	4+6	3	2	0	0	0
20	DF	(Azerbaijan) AZE	Särtan Taşkin	1	0	1	0	0	0	0	0
21	MF	(Azerbaijan) AZE	Arif Dashdemirov	37	8	29	5	4	2	4	1
22	MF	(Azerbaijan) AZE	Afran Ismayilov	13	4	8+2	3	1+2	1	0	0
23	DF	(Serbia) SRB	Vojislav Stanković	16	1	12	1	4	0	0	0
24	MF	(Azerbaijan) AZE	Fuad Bayramov	9	0	2+5	0	1+1	0	0	0
25	GK	(Azerbaijan) AZE	Salahat Aghayev	31	0	28	0	3	0	0	0
27	MF	(Costa Rica) CRC	Diego Madrigal	15	0	2+8	0	0+1	0	3+1	0
28	FW	(Georgia (country)) GEO	Bachana Tskhadadze	37	11	22+6	7	5	2	3+1	2
30	DF	(Azerbaijan) AZE	Abbas Hüseynov	1	0	0	0	1	0	0	0
33	DF	(Croatia) CRO	Matija Špičić	13	1	6+1	1	2	0	4	0
39	MF	(Azerbaijan) AZE	Elnur Süleymanov	1	0	1	0	0	0	0	0
42	MF	(Azerbaijan) AZE	Ülvi İbazadä	1	0	1	0	0	0	0	0
44	DF	(Azerbaijan) AZE	Tural Hümbätov	1	0	1	0	0	0	0	0
45	FW	(Azerbaijan) AZE	İlkin Sadıqov	1	1	1	1	0	0	0	0
61	MF	(Azerbaijan) AZE	Ruzigar İbrahimzadä	1	0	0+1	0	0	0	0	0
69	MF	(Azerbaijan) AZE	Färhad Budaqov	1	0	1	0	0	0	0	0
77	MF	(Azerbaijan) AZE	Vüsal Nağiyev	1	0	0+1	0	0	0	0	0
80	MF	(Azerbaijan) AZE	Nizami Hajiyev	23	2	12+8	2	1+2	0	0	0
82	MF	(Netherlands) NED	Ruben Schaken	5	0	2+2	0	0+1	0	0	0
88	MF	(Paraguay) PAR	David Meza	38	2	30	2	4	0	4	0
89	MF	(Azerbaijan) AZE	Qaraxan Äliyev	1	0	1	0	0	0	0	0
91	MF	(Azerbaijan) AZE	Joshgun Diniyev	29	2	23+3	2	3	0	0	0
96	GK	(Azerbaijan) AZE	Elshan Poladov	3	0	1+1	0	1	0	0	0
97	DF	(Azerbaijan) AZE	Färid Abbasli	1	0	1	0	0	0	0	0
Players away from Inter Baku on loan:
9	MF	(Azerbaijan) AZE	Mirzaga Huseynpur	6	1	0+1	0	0+1	0	0+4	1
Players who appeared for Inter Baku no longer at the club:

=== Goal scorers ===
Place	Position	Nation	Number	Name	Premier League	Azerbaijan Cup	Europa League	Total
1	FW	(Georgia (country))	28	Bachana Tskhadadze	7	2	2	11
2	MF	(Spain)	8	Mikel Álvaro	9	1	0	10
3	MF	(Azerbaijan)	21	Arif Dashdemirov	6	2	1	9
4	FW	(Brazil)	12	Nildo	8	0	0	8
5	MF	(Azerbaijan)	17	Magomed Mirzabekov	4	0	0	4
5	MF	(Azerbaijan)	11	Asif Mammadov	3	1	0	4
5	MF	(Azerbaijan)	10	Elvin Mammadov	2	1	1	4
5	MF	(Azerbaijan)	22	Afran Ismayilov	3	1	0	4
9	MF	(Paraguay)	19	César Meza	3	0	0	3
9				Own goal	1	1	1	3
11	MF	(Azerbaijan)	80	Nizami Hajiyev	2	0	0	2
11	MF	(Azerbaijan)	91	Joshgun Diniyev	2	0	0	2
11	DF	(Georgia (country))	5	Aleksandr Amisulashvili	2	0	0	2
11	MF	(Paraguay)	88	David Meza	2	0	0	2
15	MF	(Azerbaijan)	7	Abdulla Abatsiyev	1	0	0	1
15	DF	(Croatia)	33	Matija Špičić	1	0	0	1
15	DF	(Serbia)	23	Vojislav Stanković	1	0	0	1
15	FW	(Azerbaijan)	45	İlkin Sadıqov	1	0	0	1
15	MF	(Azerbaijan)	13	Mirsahib Abbasov	0	1	0	1
15	MF	(Azerbaijan)	9	Mirzaga Huseynpur	0	0	1	1
15	MF	(North Macedonia)	6	Slavčo Georgievski	0	0	1	1
				TOTALS	55	10	7	72

=== Disciplinary record ===
Number	Nation	Position	Name	Premier League		Azerbaijan Cup		Europa League		Total	
Number	Nation	Position	Name	Yellow card	Red card	Yellow card	Red card	Yellow card	Red card	Yellow card	Red card
1	(Georgia (country))	GK	Giorgi Lomaia	3	0	0	0	2	0	5	0
3	(Georgia (country))	DF	Lasha Salukvadze	2	0	1	0	0	1	3	1
4	(Spain)	DF	Iván Benítez	1	0	0	0	0	0	1	0
5	(Georgia (country))	DF	Aleksandr Amisulashvili	2	0	0	0	1	0	3	0
6	(North Macedonia)	MF	Slavčo Georgievski	0	0	0	0	1	0	1	0
7	(Azerbaijan)	MF	Abdulla Abatsiyev	2	0	1	0	0	0	3	0
8	(Spain)	MF	Mikel Álvaro	1	0	0	0	1	0	2	0
10	(Azerbaijan)	MF	Elvin Mammadov	5	1	0	0	0	0	5	1
11	(Azerbaijan)	MF	Asif Mammadov	0	0	0	0	1	0	1	0
12	(Brazil)	FW	Nildo	1	0	1	0	0	0	2	0
15	(France)	DF	Yohan Bocognano	4	0	0	0	1	0	5	0
17	(Azerbaijan)	MF	Magomed Mirzabekov	1	0	1	0	0	0	2	0
19	(Paraguay)	MF	César Meza	1	0	0	0	0	0	1	0
21	(Azerbaijan)	MF	Arif Dashdemirov	2	0	1	0	0	0	3	0
23	(Serbia)	DF	Vojislav Stanković	3	0	0	0	0	0	3	0
24	(Azerbaijan)	MF	Fuad Bayramov	2	0	0	0	0	0	2	0
25	(Azerbaijan)	GK	Salahat Aghayev	3	1	2	0	0	0	5	1
27	(Costa Rica)	MF	Diego Madrigal	1	0	0	0	1	0	2	0
28	(Georgia (country))	FW	Bachana Tskhadadze	4	0	0	0	0	0	4	0
33	(Croatia)	DF	Matija Špičić	1	0	0	0	1	0	2	0
80	(Azerbaijan)	MF	Nizami Hajiyev	3	0	0	0	0	0	3	0
88	(Paraguay)	MF	David Meza	11	0	2	0	2	0	15	0
91	(Azerbaijan)	MF	Joshgun Diniyev	4	0	2	0	0	0	6	0
			TOTALS	57	2	10	0	13	1	80	3

== Notes ==
- Qarabağ have played their home games at the Tofiq Bahramov Stadium since 1993 due to the ongoing situation in Quzanlı.
- Araz-Naxçıvan were excluded from the Azerbaijan Premier League on 17 November 2014, with all their results being annulled.
