= 2015–16 FC Inter Baku season =

Inter Baku
2015–16 season
- President: Jahangir Hajiyev
- Manager: Zaur Svanadze
- Stadium: Inter Arena
- Premier League: 4th
- Azerbaijan Cup: Semifinal
- Europa League: Third Qualifying Round vs Athletic Bilbao
- Top goalscorer: League: Dhiego Martins (5); All: Dhiego Martins (6)
Home colours	Away colours

The Inter Baku 2015–16 season is Inter Baku's fifteenth Azerbaijan Premier League season, and their first season under manager Zaur Svanadze. They will compete in the 2015–16 UEFA Europa League, entering at the first qualifying round stage, the Azerbaijan Cup and the League.

== Squad ==
As of 15 March 2016

Note: Flags indicate national team as defined under FIFA eligibility rules; some limited exceptions apply. Players may hold more than one non-FIFA nationality.

No.	Pos.	Nation	Player
1	GK	AZE	Kamran Aghayev
2	DF	AZE	Sertan Tashkin
3	DF	ESP	Juanfran
4	DF	GEO	Lasha Kasradze
5	DF	BRA	Denis Silva
6	DF	GEO	Lasha Salukvadze
7	MF	GEO	Nika Kvekveskiri
8	MF	AZE	Nizami Hajiyev
9	FW	AZE	Gara Garayev
10	MF	AZE	Elnur Abdullayev
11	FW	AZE	Rauf Aliyev
12	DF	AZE	Ruslan Amirjanov
14	DF	GEO	Zurab Khizanishvili
17	FW	AZE	Vüqar Nadirov

No.	Pos.	Nation	Player
18	MF	AZE	Mansur Nahavandi
19	MF	AZE	Mirhuseyn Seyidov
20	FW	UKR	Yuriy Fomenko
22	DF	AZE	Ilkin Qirtimov
23	MF	PAR	César Meza
24	MF	AZE	Fuad Bayramov
30	DF	AZE	Abbas Hüseynov
39	MF	AZE	Elnur Suleymanov
45	FW	AZE	Ilkin Sadigov
77	MF	AZE	Mirsahib Abbasov
79	GK	GEO	Giorgi Lomaia
96	GK	AZE	Elshan Poladov
99	FW	AZE	Bilal Gambarov

=== Out on loan ===
Note: Flags indicate national team as defined under FIFA eligibility rules; some limited exceptions apply. Players may hold more than one non-FIFA nationality.

No. / Pos. / Nation / Player; 17 / FW / AZE / Tural Gurbatov (at Khazar Lankaran)	No. / Pos. / Nation / Player; 23 / DF / SRB / Vojislav Stanković (at Gabala)

== Transfers ==
=== Summer ===
In: Note: Flags indicate national team as defined under FIFA eligibility rules; some limited exceptions apply. Players may hold more than one non-FIFA nationality.

No.	Pos.	Nation	Player
3	DF	ESP	Juanfran (from (Azerbaijan) AZAL)
4	DF	GEO	Lasha Kasradze (from (Azerbaijan) AZAL)
5	DF	BRA	Denis Silva (from (Azerbaijan) Neftchi Baku)
7	MF	GEO	Nika Kvekveskiri (from (Georgia (country)) Dila Gori)
9	FW	FRA	L'Imam Seydi (from (Azerbaijan) Khazar Lankaran)
10	MF	AZE	Elnur Abdullayev (from (Azerbaijan) Simurq)
11	FW	AZE	Rauf Aliyev (from (Azerbaijan) Neftchi Baku)
12	DF	AZE	Ruslan Amirjanov (from (Azerbaijan) Gabala)
14	DF	GEO	Zurab Khizanishvili (from (Georgia (country)) Samtredia)
15	MF	CRO	Stjepan Poljak (from (Azerbaijan) Simurq)
19	MF	AZE	Mirhüseyn Seyidov (from (Azerbaijan) Neftchi Baku)
20	FW	UKR	Yuriy Fomenko (from (Lithuania) Šiauliai)
21	DF	AZE	Novruz Mammadov (from (Azerbaijan) AZAL)
22	DF	AZE	Ilkin Qirtimov (from (Azerbaijan) Simurq)
23	FW	BRA	Dhiego Martins (from (Albania) Skënderbeu Korçë)
77	MF	ALB	Emiljano Vila (from (Albania) Partizani Tirana)

Out: Note: Flags indicate national team as defined under FIFA eligibility rules; some limited exceptions apply. Players may hold more than one non-FIFA nationality.

No.	Pos.	Nation	Player
2	DF	AZE	Azer Salahli (to (Azerbaijan) Qarabağ)
5	DF	GEO	Aleksandr Amisulashvili (to (Turkey) Karşıyaka)
6	MF	MKD	Slavčo Georgievski
8	MF	ESP	Mikel Álvaro (to (New Zealand) Auckland City)
9	MF	PAR	César Meza
10	MF	AZE	Elvin Mammadov (to (Azerbaijan) Qarabağ)
11	MF	AZE	Asif Mammadov (to (Azerbaijan) Gabala)
12	FW	BRA	Nildo
15	DF	FRA	Yohan Bocognano (to (Romania) Petrolul Ploiești)
16	MF	NED	Youssef Fennich
17	MF	AZE	Magomed Mirzabekov (to (Azerbaijan) Gabala)
17	FW	AZE	Tural Gurbatov (loan to (Azerbaijan) Ravan Baku)
21	DF	AZE	Arif Dashdemirov (to (Azerbaijan) Gabala)
21	DF	AZE	Novruz Mammadov (to (Azerbaijan) Ravan Baku)
22	MF	AZE	Afran Ismayilov (to (Azerbaijan) Qarabağ)
23	DF	SRB	Vojislav Stanković (loan to (Azerbaijan) Gabala)
27	MF	CRC	Diego Madrigal (to (Costa Rica) Belén)
28	FW	GEO	Bachana Tskhadadze (to (Albania) Flamurtari Vlorë)
29	DF	AZE	Ruslan Cafarov
33	DF	CRO	Matija Špičić (to (Croatia) Osijek)
82	MF	NED	Ruben Schaken (to (Netherlands) ADO Den Haag)
88	MF	PAR	David Meza (to (Azerbaijan) Gabala)
91	MF	AZE	Joshgun Diniyev (to (Azerbaijan) Qarabağ)
—	MF	AZE	Mirzaga Huseynpur (to (Azerbaijan) Sumgayit)

=== Winter ===
In: Note: Flags indicate national team as defined under FIFA eligibility rules; some limited exceptions apply. Players may hold more than one non-FIFA nationality.

No.	Pos.	Nation	Player
1	GK	AZE	Kamran Aghayev (from (Turkey) Karşıyaka)
9	FW	AZE	Gara Garayev (from (Spain) Málaga)
17	FW	AZE	Vüqar Nadirov (from (Azerbaijan) Gabala)
23	MF	PAR	César Meza (Free agent)

Out: Note: Flags indicate national team as defined under FIFA eligibility rules; some limited exceptions apply. Players may hold more than one non-FIFA nationality.

No.	Pos.	Nation	Player
1	GK	AZE	Salahat Aghayev (to (Azerbaijan) Sumgayit)
3	DF	ESP	Juanfran (to (Spain) Castellón)
9	FW	FRA	L'Imam Seydi (to (Malta) Birkirkara)
15	MF	CRO	Stjepan Poljak (to (Croatia) Zagorec Krapina)
23	FW	BRA	Dhiego Martins (to (Hong Kong) Pegasus)
44	DF	ESP	Iván Benítez
77	MF	ALB	Emiljano Vila (to (Albania) Partizani Tirana)
88	MF	AZE	Abdulla Abatsiyev (to (Russia) Torpedo Armavir)
—	FW	AZE	Tural Gurbatov (loan to (Azerbaijan) Khazar Lankaran, previously on loan to (Azerbaijan) Ravan Baku)

== Friendlies ==
24 June 2015	Gabala	1 – 0	Inter Baku	Qabala
AZST (UTC+5)	Antonov 68'	Report		Stadium: Gabala City Stadium

27 June 2015	Gabala	1 – 1	Inter Baku	Qabala
20:00 AZST (UTC+5)	Huseynov 70'	Report	Aliyev 8'	Stadium: Gabala City Stadium

13 January 2016	Inter Baku (Azerbaijan)	0 – 1	(Germany) Werder Bremen II	Antalya, Turkey
17:00 AZT (UTC+4)		Summary	Bytyqi 61'

15 January 2016	Inter Baku (Azerbaijan)	0 – 1	(Germany) Werder Bremen	Antalya, Turkey
14:00 AZT (UTC+4)		Summary	Pizarro 41'

19 January 2016	Inter Baku (Azerbaijan)	–	(Czech Republic) Slovan Liberec	Antalya, Turkey
AZT (UTC+4)		[ Summary]

23 January 2016	Inter Baku (Azerbaijan)	–	(Kazakhstan) Atyrau	Antalya, Turkey
(UTC+6)		[ Summary]

== Competitions ==
=== Azerbaijan Premier League ===
==== Results summary ====
Overall								Home						Away					
Pld	W	D	L	GF	GA	GD	Pts	W	D	L	GF	GA	GD	W	D	L	GF	GA	GD
36	16	11	9	37	26	+11	59	11	3	4	21	11	+10	5	8	5	16	15	+1

Last updated: 20 May 2016.
Source: Soccerway

==== Results ====
9 August 2015 1	Khazar Lankaran	2 – 0	Inter Baku	Lankaran
21:00 AZST (UTC+5)	E.Jäfärov 7'; Amirguliyev 31'; Ramaldanov (yellow card) 68'; O.Sadıqlı (yellow card) 85'	Report	N.Kvekveskiri (yellow card) 16'; Kasradze (yellow card) 26'; Lomaia (yellow card) 55'	Stadium: Lankaran City Stadium; Attendance: 7,000; Referee: Rahim Häsänov

17 August 2015 2	Inter Baku	1 – 0	Neftchi Baku	Baku
21:00 AZST (UTC+5)	Qirtimov (yellow card) 19' (yellow-red card) 80'; Denis 45' (yellow card) 72'; Aliyev (yellow card) 80'; Khizanishvili (yellow card) 87'	Report	Melli (red card) 16'; Ramos (yellow card) 52'; M.Isayev (yellow card) 56'	Stadium: Inter Arena; Attendance: 1,000; Referee: Orkhan Mämmädov

24 August 2015 3	Zira	0 – 0	Inter Baku	Baku
21:00 AZST (UTC+5)	Meulens (yellow card) 45'; Mbah (yellow card) 55'; V.Igbekoi (yellow card) 67'; N.Gurbanov (yellow card) 88'; Abdullayev (yellow card) 90+4'	Report	Seyidov (yellow card) 67'; Denis (yellow card) 67'	Stadium: Zira Olympic Sport Complex Stadium; Attendance: 1,000; Referee: Fariz Yusifov

12 September 2015 4	Inter Baku	2 – 1	Gabala	Baku
20:00 AZST (UTC+5)	Martins 10', 29'; Hajiyev (yellow card) 88'	Report	Abbasov (yellow card) 36'; Dashdemirov (yellow card) 64'; Antonov 84'	Stadium: Inter Arena; Attendance: 1,000; Referee: Rahim Häsänov

18 September 2015 5	AZAL	0 – 1	Inter Baku	Baku
21:00 AZST (UTC+5)	M.Teymurov (yellow card) 21'; M.Sattarly (yellow card) 64'; I.Alakbarov (yellow card) 88'	Report	Hajiyev 16' (yellow card) 65'; E.Abdullayev (yellow card) 88'	Stadium: AZAL Stadium; Attendance: 100; Referee: Ingilab Mämmädov

25 September 2015 6	Inter Baku	1 – 0	Kapaz	Baku
19:00 AZST (UTC+5)	Hajiyev (yellow card) 45'; Martins 53' (yellow card) 69' (yellow-red card) 83'; Lomaia (yellow card) 85'	Report	B.Soltanov (yellow card) 41'; T.Akhundov (yellow card) 56'; B.Nasirov (yellow card) 56'; Dário (yellow card) 87'	Stadium: Inter Arena; Attendance: 500; Referee: Rauf Jabbarov

4 October 2015 7	Inter Baku	0 – 2	Qarabağ	Baku
19:00 AZST (UTC+5)	Qirtimov (yellow card) 61'; Seyidov (yellow card) 72'; Lomaia (yellow card) 78' (red card) 90'; Khizanishvili (yellow card) 90' (red card) 90+3'	Report	Quintana 30'; Gurbanov (yellow card) 53'; Reynaldo 90+3'	Stadium: Inter Arena; Attendance: 1,800; Referee: Elvin Äsgärov

18 October 2015 8	Sumgayit	1 – 1	Inter Baku	Sumqayit
20:00 AZST (UTC+5)	Fardjad-Azad 10'; E.Mehdiyev (yellow card) 27'	Report	N.Kvekveskiri 36'; Abatsiyev (yellow card) 41'; E.Abdullayev (yellow card) 88'	Stadium: Kapital Bank Arena; Attendance: 1,000; Referee: Omar Paşayev

24 October 2015 9	Inter Baku	2 – 0	Ravan Baku	Baku
17:00 AZST (UTC+5)	Fomenko 32'; Qirtimov 49'	Report	K.Muslumov (yellow card) 47'; Makhnovskyi (yellow card) 49'	Stadium: Inter Arena; Attendance: 500; Referee: Rähim Häsänov

28 October 2015 10	Neftchi Baku	1 – 1	Inter Baku	Baku
19:00 AZT (UTC+4)	Qurbanov 35' (pen.); Ramos (yellow card) 39'; A.Mammadov (yellow card) 52'; F.Muradbayli (yellow card) 63'; Ailton (yellow card) 90+1'	Report	A.Hüseynov (yellow card) 34'; Hajiyev 86'; Abatsiyev (yellow card) 90+2'; Salukvadze (yellow card) 90+3'	Stadium: Bakcell Arena; Attendance: 500; Referee: Elvin Äsgärov

31 October 2015 11	Inter Baku	0 – 0	Zira	Baku
16:00 AZT (UTC+4)	Abatsiyev (yellow card) 22'	Report	Krneta (yellow card) 29'; Mbah (yellow card) 45+1'; Nazirov (yellow card) 74'	Stadium: Inter Arena; Attendance: 450; Referee: Fariz Yusifov

9 November 2015 12	Gabala	1 – 1	Inter Baku	Qabala
16:00 AZT (UTC+4)	Antonov 30'; Mirzabekov (yellow card) 36'; Abbasov (yellow card) 68'; Stanković (yellow card) 71'; E.Jamalov (yellow card) 79'; Dashdemirov (yellow card) 90+3'	Report	Martins 35'; S.Aghayev (yellow card) 77'; A.Hüseynov (yellow card) 90+4'	Stadium: Gabala City Stadium; Attendance: 1,500; Referee: Rahim Häsänov

23 November 2015 13	Inter Baku	2 – 0	AZAL	Baku
17:00 AZT (UTC+4)	Martins 30' (yellow card) 36'; Denis (yellow card) 56'; Khizanishvili (yellow card) 83'; A.Hüseynov 85'; Qirtimov (yellow card) 86'	Report	G.Mähämmädov (yellow card) 45+1'	Stadium: Inter Arena; Attendance: 800; Referee: Ravan Hämzäzadä

27 November 2015 14	Kapaz	0 – 0	Inter Baku	Ganja
14:00 AZT (UTC+4)	A.Karimov (yellow card) 27'; Eyyubov (yellow card) 44'	Report	Poljak (yellow card) 60'; Denis (yellow card) 85'; Khizanishvili (yellow card) 86'	Stadium: Ganja City Stadium; Attendance: 12,300; Referee: Rahim Häsänov

6 December 2015 15	Qarabağ	1 – 0	Inter Baku	Baku
18:30 AZT (UTC+4)	Quintana 34'; Diniyev (yellow card) 88'	Report	Martins (yellow card) 81'	Stadium: Tofiq Bahramov Stadium^{1} Attendance: 1,000; Referee: Aliyar Ağayev

11 December 2015 16	Inter Baku	2 – 3	Sumgayit	Baku
16:30 AZT (UTC+4)	Fomenko 44'; E.Abdullayev 52'; Hajiyev (yellow card) 90'; Khizanishvili (yellow card) 90+3'	Report	A.Yunanov 2', 39'; Chertoganov (yellow card) 17'; S.Alkhasov 32' (yellow card) 89'; Ramazanov (yellow card) 83'	Stadium: Inter Arena; Attendance: 500; Referee: Rävan Hämzäzadä

15 December 2015 17	Ravan Baku	0 – 2	Inter Baku	Baku
20:30 AZT (UTC+4)	V.Baybalayev (yellow card) 29'; K.Muslumov (yellow card) 68'	Report	Abatsiyev (yellow card) 45'; Khizanishvili 51'; Fomenko (yellow card) 67'; Qirtimov (yellow card) 75'; Seydi 85'; E.Abdullayev (yellow card) 90+3'	Stadium: Bayil Stadium; Attendance: 200; Referee: Rauf Jabbarov

20 December 2015 18	Inter Baku	2 – 0	Khazar Lankaran	Baku
16:30 AZT (UTC+4)	Khizanishvili 28'; A.Hüseynov (yellow card) 30'; E.Abdullayev 47'	Report	H.Xəlilzadə (yellow card) 87'	Stadium: Inter Arena; Attendance: 500; Referee: İnqilab Mämmädov

31 January 2016 19	Zira	2 – 1	Inter Baku	Baku
17:30 AZT (UTC+4)	Krneta (yellow card) 2'; Tato 13'; N.Novruzov 86'; V.Igbekoi (yellow card) 88'	Report	A.Hüseynov 48'; G.Garayev (yellow card) 79'; Hajiyev (yellow card) 90+1'	Stadium: Zira Olympic Sport Complex Stadium; Attendance: 1,300; Referee: Rauf Jabbarov

7 February 2016 20	Inter Baku	0 – 1	Gabala	Baku
17:40 AZT (UTC+4)	Meza (yellow card) 55'; Nadirov (yellow card) 89'	Report	Sadiqov (yellow card) 9'; Zec 18'; Santos (yellow card) 44'	Stadium: Inter Arena; Attendance: 500; Referee: Rahim Häsänov

13 February 2016 21	AZAL	0 – 0	Inter Baku	Baku
14:30 AZT (UTC+4)	Jafarguliyev (yellow card) 41'; T.Hümbätov (yellow card) 83'; I.Alakbarov (yellow card) 90'	Report		Stadium: AZAL Arena; Attendance: 300; Referee: Elvin Əsgərov

19 February 2016 22	Inter Baku	1 – 0	Kapaz	Baku
15:00 AZT (UTC+4)	F.Bayramov (yellow card) 36'; Hajiyev 55'; Kvekveskiri (yellow card) 60'; Aghayev (yellow card) 80'; Fomenko (yellow card) 89'	Report	Alasgarov (yellow card) 68'; Ebah (yellow card) 88'	Stadium: Inter Arena; Attendance: 300; Referee: Fariz Yusifov

27 February 2016 23	Inter Baku	1 – 1	Qarabağ	Baku
18:00 AZT (UTC+4)	Hajiyev 42'; Meza (yellow card) 51'; Kvekveskiri (yellow card) 58'; Lomaia (yellow card) 59'; Aghayev (yellow card) 68'	Report	Diniyev (yellow card) 59'; Sadygov 87'	Stadium: Inter Arena; Attendance: 2,000; Referee: Omar Paşayev

5 March 2016 24	Sumgayit	0 – 1	Inter Baku	Sumqayit
17:00 AZT (UTC+4)	J.Hajiyev (yellow card) 32'; Guluzade (yellow card) 39'; Chertoganov (yellow card) 78'	Report	Hajiyev 48'; E.Abdullayev (yellow card) 67'; Qirtimov (yellow card) 87'	Stadium: Kapital Bank Arena; Attendance: 1,400; Referee: Rauf Cabbarov

13 March 2016 25	Inter Baku	3 – 1	Ravan Baku	Baku
15:00 AZT (UTC+4)	Khizanishvili 8'; M.Abbasov 18'; Kvekveskiri 22'; Amirjanov (yellow card) 35'; C.Meza (yellow card) 49'	Report	R.Tagizade 7'; K.Muslumov (yellow card) 21'; Khamid (yellow card) 41'; Yunisoğlu (yellow card) 58'	Stadium: Inter Arena; Attendance: 300; Referee: Orkhan Məmmədov

20 March 2016 26	Khazar Lankaran	0 – 1	Inter Baku	Lankaran
13:30 AZT (UTC+4)		Report	Kasradze (yellow card) 19'; Kvekveskiri 30'; Khizanishvili (yellow card) 51'	Stadium: Lankaran City Stadium; Attendance: 2,700; Referee: Omar Paşayev

30 March 2016 27	Inter Baku	0 – 1	Neftchi Baku	Baku
18:00 AZT (UTC+4)	Khizanishvili (yellow card) 10'; Seyidov (yellow card) 19'; E.Abdullayev (yellow card) 81'; Denis (yellow card) 85'	Report	Qurbanov 50' (pen.); K.Gurbanov (yellow card) 79'	Stadium: Inter Arena; Attendance: 350; Referee: Aliyar Ağayev

3 April 2016 28	Gabala	0 – 0	Inter Baku	Qabala
19:00 AZT (UTC+4)	A.Mammadov (yellow card) 54'	Report	Salukvadze (yellow card) 59'; Fomenko (yellow card) 90+2'	Stadium: Gabala City Stadium; Attendance: 450; Referee: Rəhim Həsənov

9 April 2016 29	Inter Baku	1 – 0	AZAL	Baku
17:00 AZT (UTC+4)	Meza (yellow card) 19'; Amirjanov (yellow card) 60'; Nadirov 64'	Report	T.Hümbätov (yellow card) 45+1'; Jafarguliyev (yellow card) 84'	Stadium: Inter Arena; Attendance: 300; Referee: Orkhan Məmmədov

15 April 2016 30	Kapaz	1 – 1	Inter Baku	Ganja
13:30 AZT (UTC+4)	T.Akhundov 32' (pen.)	Report	Nadirov (yellow card) 10'; E.Abdullayev (yellow card) 20'; Fomenko 56'	Stadium: Ganja City Stadium; Attendance: 11,300; Referee: Aliyar Ağayev

22 April 2016 31	Qarabağ	2 – 0	Inter Baku	Baku
19:00 AZT (UTC+4)	Reynaldo 12'; Muarem 50'	Report	Lomaia (yellow card) 36'; F.Bayramov (yellow card) 44' (yellow-red card) 75'; S.Tashkin (yellow card) 63'; Aliyev (yellow card) 81'	Stadium: Azersun Arena; Attendance: 1,500; Referee: Ravan Həmzəzadə

1 May 2016 32	Inter Baku	2 – 2	Sumgayit	Baku
16:00 AZT (UTC+4)	M.Abbasov 11'; Aghayev (red card) 27'; Aliyev (yellow card) 41'; Kvekveskiri 90+4'	Report	Javadov 6'; A.Yunanov 19'; J.Hajiyev (red card) 90+1'	Stadium: Inter Arena; Attendance: 400; Referee: Omar Paşayev

7 May 2016 33	Ravan Baku	0 – 4	Inter Baku	Baku
17:00 AZT (UTC+4)	R.Tagizade (yellow card) 24'; N.Mammadov (yellow card) 76'; A.Huseynov (yellow card) 89'	Report	A.Hüseynov (yellow card) 20' (goal) 23'; M.Abbasov 42', 56'; Hajiyev (yellow card) 82' (goal) 90'	Stadium: Bayil Stadium; Attendance: 250; Referee: Fariz Yusifov

11 May 2016 34	Inter Baku	2 – 1	Khazar Lankaran	Baku
17:00 AZT (UTC+4)	Aliyev 14'; Fomenko 27' (yellow card) 61'; Lomaia (yellow card) 90+2'	Report	Mammadov (yellow card) 15'; V.Gulaliyev 47' (yellow card) 65'	Stadium: Inter Arena; Attendance: 550; Referee: Omar Paşayev

15 May 2016 35	Neftchi Baku	4 – 2	Inter Baku	Masazır
18:00 AZT (UTC+4)	Qurbanov 27'; A.Abdullayev 33'; E.Abdullayev 51'; Ailton (yellow card) 80' (goal) 84'	Report	M.Abbasov 6', 90+2'; Salukvadze (yellow card) 22'; Lomaia (yellow card) 23'; Meza (yellow card) 41'	Stadium: Alinja Arena; Attendance: 500; Referee: Ramil Diniyev

20 May 2016 36	Inter Baku	1 – 0	Zira	Baku
17:00 AZT (UTC+4)	Hajiyev (yellow card) 52'; Qirtimov (yellow card) 61'; A.Hüseynov 69'; Aliyev (yellow card) 90+4'	Report	A.Hüseynov (yellow card) 37'; Ivanović (yellow card) 45'; A.Naghiyev (yellow card) 53'; Isgandarli (yellow card) 90'	Stadium: Inter Arena; Attendance: 320; Referee: Fariz Yusifov

==== League table ====
Pos	Team	Pld	W	D	L	GF	GA	GD	Pts	Qualification or relegation
2	Zira (Note: Zira would have qualified for the Europa League first qualifying round, but failed to obtain a UEFA licence as the club has existed professionally for less than three season.)	36	17	11	8	42	31	+11	62	
3	Gabala	36	16	11	9	44	28	+16	59 (Note: Gabala ahead of Inter Baku on head-to-head record: Inter Baku–Gabala 2–1, Gabala–Inter Baku 1–1, Inter Baku–Gabala 0–1, Gabala–Inter Baku 0–0.)	Qualification for the Europa League first qualifying round
4	Inter Baku (Note: On 31 March 2016, the Adjudicatory Chamber of the UEFA Club Financial Control Body (CFCB) announced that Inter Baku will be excluded from participating in the next UEFA club competition for which they would otherwise qualify in the next three seasons (i.e. the 2016/17, 2017/18 and 2018/19 seasons).)	36	16	11	9	39	28	+11	59	
5	Kapaz	36	15	11	10	48	40	+8	56	Qualification for the Europa League first qualifying round
6	Neftçi Baku	36	13	10	13	41	41	0	49	Qualification for the Europa League first qualifying round

Source: PFL, UEFA, Soccerway
Rules for classification: 1) Points; 2) Head-to-head points; 3) Head-to-head goal difference; 4) Head-to-head goals scored; 5) Head-to-head away goals scored (only if two teams); 6) Goal difference; 7) Goals scored.

=== Azerbaijan Cup ===
2 December 2015 Second Round	Turan Tovuz	1 – 3	Inter Baku	Tovuz
14:00 AZT (UTC+4)	A.Mammadov 15'; A.Qädiri (yellow card) 30'; Garaev (yellow card) 39'; E.Alışanlı (yellow card) 90+3'	Summary	S.Bağırov 5' (o.g.); F.Bayramov (yellow card) 17'; Kasradze 24'; A.Huseynov 27'; Juanfran (yellow card) 63'	Stadium: Tovuz City Stadium; Attendance: 500; Referee: İnqilab Mämmädov

2 March 2016 Quarterfinal 1st leg	Ravan Baku	2 – 1	Inter Baku	Baku
19:00 AZT (UTC+4)	R.Tagizade (yellow card) 16'; M.Hashimli (yellow card) 43'; N.Gurbanov 61' (yellow card) 90'; Abbasov 81'	Summary	Denis (yellow card) 7'; C.Meza (yellow card) 22' (goal) 56'; A.Huseynov (yellow card) 70'; Nadirov (yellow card) 80'	Stadium: Bayil Stadium; Attendance: 200; Referee: Ramil Diniyev

9 March 2016 Quarterfinal 2nd leg	Inter Baku	3 – 0 (4 – 2 agg.)	Ravan Baku	Baku
14:00 AZT (UTC+4)	Kvekveskiri 31'; C.Meza (yellow card) 63' (goal) 65'; Nadirov 85'	Summary	Y.Ağakarimzada (yellow card) 10'; R.Azizli (yellow card) 30'; Khamid (yellow card) 71'; K.Muslumov (yellow card) 76'	Stadium: Inter Arena; Attendance: 400; Referee: Ramil Diniyev

27 April 2016 Semifinal 1st leg	Inter Baku	0 – 4	Qarabağ	Baku
16:00 AZT (UTC+4)	Seyidov (yellow card) 36'	Summary	Míchel 19', 61'; Quintana 67'; Reynaldo 85'	Stadium: Inter Arena; Attendance: 2,316; Referee: Rahim Həsənov

4 May 2016 Semifinal 2nd leg	Qarabağ	1 – 0	Inter Baku	Masazır
19:00 AZT (UTC+4)	Míchel 23'; Richard (yellow card) 79'; E.Yagublu (yellow card) 87'	Summary	Fomenko (yellow card) 64'	Stadium: Masazir Stadium; Attendance: 2,800; Referee: Ramil Diniyev

=== UEFA Europa League ===
==== Qualifying rounds ====
2 July 2015 First qualifying round 1st leg	Laçi (Albania)	1 – 1	(Azerbaijan) Inter Baku	Laç, Albania
20:30 AZST (UTC+5)	Meto 20' (yellow card) 20'; Sefgjinaj (yellow card) 46'; Sheta (yellow card) 60'	Report	Kvekveskiri 47'; M.Abbasov (yellow card) 70'	Stadium: Laçi Stadium; Attendance: 850; Referee: Carlos del Cerro Grande (Spain)

9 July 2015 First qualifying round 2nd leg	Inter Baku (Azerbaijan)	0 – 0 ((a)1 – 1 agg.)	(Albania) Laçi	Baku, Azerbaijan
AZST (UTC+5)	Khizanishvili (yellow card) 72'	Report	Veliaj (yellow card) 88'	Stadium: Inter Arena; Attendance: 3,000; Referee: Alexandr Aliyev (Kazakhstan)

17 July 2015 Second qualifying round 1st leg	FH (Iceland)	1 – 2	(Azerbaijan) Inter Baku	Hafnarfjörður, Iceland
00:15 AZST (UTC+5)	B.Böðvarsson (yellow card) 19'; Guðnason 39' (pen.); Hendrickx (yellow card) 48'; R.O.Óskarsson (red card) 50'; Viðarsson (yellow card) 66'; Doumbia (yellow card) 79'; K.F.Finnbogason (yellow card) 89'	Report	F.Bayramov (yellow card) 39'; Khizanishvili (yellow card) 48'; Kvekveskiri 54' (pen.); Martins 61'	Stadium: Kaplakrikavöllur; Attendance: 1,020; Referee: Michael Lerjéus (Sweden)

23 July 2015 Second qualifying round 2nd leg	Inter Baku (Azerbaijan)	2 – 2 (a.e.t.) (4 – 3 agg.)	(Iceland) FH	Baku, Azerbaijan
21:00 AZST (UTC+5)	Huseynov 45+2'; Aliyev 91' (yellow card) 101'; S.Aghayev (yellow card) 112'	Report	K.F. Finnbogason (yellow card) 40' (yellow-red card) 55' (goal) 52'; Valdimarsson 47' (yellow card) 84'; Jónsson (yellow card) 57'; E.Pálsson (yellow card) 79'; P.Viðarsson (yellow card) 90+2'	Stadium: Inter Arena; Attendance: 3,500; Referee: Yaroslav Kozyk (Ukraine)

30 July 2015 Third qualifying round 1st leg	Athletic Bilbao (Spain)	2 – 0	(Azerbaijan) Inter Baku	Bilbao, Spain
23:45 AZST (UTC+5)	Eraso 12', 49'	Report	N.Kvekveskiri (yellow card) 62'	Stadium: San Mamés; Attendance: 32,823; Referee: Stavros Tritsonis (Greece)

6 August 2015 Third qualifying round 2nd leg	Inter Baku (Azerbaijan)	0 – 0 (0 – 2 agg.)	(Spain) Athletic Bilbao	Baku, Azerbaijan
21:00 AZST (UTC+5)	Seyidov (yellow card) 55'	Report	Balenziaga (yellow card) 25'	Stadium: Inter Arena; Attendance: 4,000; Referee: Serdar Gözübüyük (Netherlands)

== Squad statistics ==
As of Match played 20 May 2016

=== Appearances and goals ===
No.	Pos	Nat	Player	Total		Premier League		Azerbaijan Cup		Europa League	
No.	Pos	Nat	Player	Apps	Goals	Apps	Goals	Apps	Goals	Apps	Goals
1	GK	(Azerbaijan) AZE	Kamran Aghayev	12	0	9	0	3	0	0	0
2	DF	(Azerbaijan) AZE	Sertan Tashkin	10	0	5+4	0	1	0	0	0
3	DF	(Brazil) BRA	Denis Silva	42	1	34	1	3+1	0	2+2	0
4	DF	(Georgia (country)) GEO	Lasha Kasradze	29	1	14+6	0	3	1	6	0
6	DF	(Georgia (country)) GEO	Lasha Salukvadze	28	0	22+1	0	5	0	0	0
7	MF	(Georgia (country)) GEO	Nika Kvekveskiri	38	7	28+1	4	3	1	6	2
8	MF	(Azerbaijan) AZE	Nizami Hajiyev	33	6	20+5	6	2	0	5+1	0
9	FW	(Azerbaijan) AZE	Gara Garayev	8	0	1+4	0	1+2	0	0	0
10	MF	(Azerbaijan) AZE	Elnur Abdullayev	27	2	13+9	2	3	0	0+2	0
11	FW	(Azerbaijan) AZE	Rauf Aliyev	17	2	8+2	1	1	0	6	1
12	DF	(Azerbaijan) AZE	Ruslan Amirjanov	20	0	10+6	0	1+3	0	0	0
14	DF	(Georgia (country)) GEO	Zurab Khizanishvili	33	3	24	3	3	0	6	0
17	FW	(Azerbaijan) AZE	Vüqar Nadirov	17	2	9+4	1	2+2	1	0	0
18	MF	(Azerbaijan) AZE	Mansur Nahavandi	6	0	2+1	0	0+1	0	0+2	0
19	MF	(Azerbaijan) AZE	Mirhuseyn Seyidov	23	0	10+6	0	2	0	5	0
20	FW	(Ukraine) UKR	Yuriy Fomenko	34	4	20+8	4	2+1	0	1+2	0
22	DF	(Azerbaijan) AZE	Ilkin Qirtimov	36	1	28+3	1	2	0	2+1	0
23	MF	(Paraguay) PAR	César Meza	17	2	15	0	2	2	0	0
24	MF	(Azerbaijan) AZE	Fuad Bayramov	36	0	24+3	0	3	0	6	0
30	DF	(Azerbaijan) AZE	Abbas Hüseynov	35	6	20+6	4	4	1	4+1	1
33	MF	(Azerbaijan) AZE	Agshin Guluzade	2	0	0+1	0	1	0	0	0
45	FW	(Azerbaijan) AZE	Ilkin Sadigov	4	0	0+1	0	0+1	0	0+2	0
77	MF	(Azerbaijan) AZE	Mirsahib Abbasov	28	6	12+9	6	2+1	0	3+1	0
79	GK	(Georgia (country)) GEO	Giorgi Lomaia	16	0	12+2	0	2	0	0	0
96	GK	(Azerbaijan) AZE	Elshan Poladov	2	0	2	0	0	0	0	0
Players away from Inter Baku on loan:
Players who appeared for Inter Baku no longer at the club:
1	GK	(Azerbaijan) AZE	Salahat Aghayev	19	0	13	0	0	0	6	0
3	DF	(Spain) ESP	Juanfran	14	0	6+2	0	1	0	5	0
9	FW	(France) FRA	L'Imam Seydi	8	1	3+4	1	1	0	0	0
15	MF	(Croatia) CRO	Stjepan Poljak	18	0	8+6	0	0+1	0	1+2	0
23	FW	(Brazil) BRA	Dhiego Martins	18	6	14+1	5	0	0	2+1	1
77	MF	(Albania) ALB	Emiljano Vila	7	0	1+5	0	1	0	0	0
88	MF	(Azerbaijan) AZE	Abdulla Abatsiyev	12	0	9+2	0	1	0	0	0

=== Goal scorers ===
Place	Position	Nation	Number	Name	Premier League	Azerbaijan Cup	Europa League	Total
1	MF	(Georgia (country))	7	Nika Kvekveskiri	4	1	2	7
2	MF	(Azerbaijan)	8	Nizami Hajiyev	6	0	0	6
2	MF	(Azerbaijan)	77	Mirsahib Abbasov	6	0	0	6
2	FW	(Brazil)	23	Dhiego Martins	5	0	1	6
5	DF	(Azerbaijan)	30	Abbas Hüseynov	4	0	1	5
6	FW	(Ukraine)	20	Yuriy Fomenko	4	0	0	4
7	DF	(Georgia (country))	14	Zurab Khizanishvili	3	0	0	3
8	MF	(Azerbaijan)	10	Elnur Abdullayev	2	0	0	2
8	FW	(Azerbaijan)	17	Vüqar Nadirov	1	1	0	2
8	FW	(Azerbaijan)	11	Rauf Aliyev	1	0	1	2
8	MF	(Paraguay)	23	César Meza	0	2	0	2
12	DF	(Brazil)	5	Denis Silva	1	0	0	1
12	DF	(Azerbaijan)	22	Ilkin Qirtimov	1	0	0	1
12	FW	(France)	9	L'Imam Seydi	1	0	0	1
12	DF	(Georgia (country))	4	Lasha Kasradze	0	1	0	1
12				Own goal	0	1	0	1
				TOTALS	37	7	5	49

=== Disciplinary record ===
Number	Nation	Position	Name	Premier League		Azerbaijan Cup		Europa League		Total	
Number	Nation	Position	Name	Yellow card	Red card	Yellow card	Red card	Yellow card	Red card	Yellow card	Red card
1	(Azerbaijan)	GK	Salahat Aghayev	1	0	0	0	1	0	2	0
1	(Azerbaijan)	GK	Kamran Aghayev	2	1	0	0	1	0	3	1
2	(Azerbaijan)	DF	Sertan Tashkin	1	0	0	0	0	0	1	0
3	(Spain)	DF	Juanfran	0	0	1	0	0	0	1	0
4	(Georgia (country))	DF	Lasha Kasradze	2	0	0	0	0	0	2	0
5	(Brazil)	DF	Denis Silva	5	0	1	0	0	0	6	0
6	(Georgia (country))	DF	Lasha Salukvadze	4	0	0	0	1	0	5	0
7	(Georgia (country))	MF	Nika Kvekveskiri	3	0	0	0	1	0	4	0
8	(Azerbaijan)	MF	Nizami Hajiyev	7	0	0	0	0	0	7	0
9	(Azerbaijan)	FW	Gara Garayev	1	0	0	0	0	0	1	0
10	(Azerbaijan)	MF	Elnur Abdullayev	6	0	0	0	0	0	6	0
11	(Azerbaijan)	FW	Rauf Aliyev	4	0	0	0	1	0	5	0
12	(Azerbaijan)	DF	Ruslan Amirjanov	2	0	0	0	0	0	2	0
13	(Azerbaijan)	MF	Mirsahib Abbasov	0	0	0	0	1	0	1	0
14	(Georgia (country))	DF	Zurab Khizanishvili	7	1	0	0	2	0	9	1
15	(Croatia)	MF	Stjepan Poljak	1	0	0	0	0	0	1	0
17	(Azerbaijan)	FW	Vüqar Nadirov	2	0	1	0	0	0	3	0
19	(Azerbaijan)	MF	Mirhüseyn Seyidov	3	0	1	0	1	0	5	0
20	(Ukraine)	FW	Yuriy Fomenko	4	0	1	0	0	0	5	0
22	(Azerbaijan)	DF	Ilkin Qirtimov	7	1	0	0	0	0	7	1
23	(Brazil)	FW	Dhiego Martins	4	1	0	0	0	0	4	1
23	(Paraguay)	MF	César Meza	5	0	2	0	0	0	7	0
24	(Azerbaijan)	MF	Fuad Bayramov	3	1	1	0	1	0	5	1
30	(Azerbaijan)	DF	Abbas Hüseynov	4	0	1	0	0	0	5	0
79	(Georgia (country))	GK	Giorgi Lomaia	7	1	0	0	0	0	7	1
88	(Azerbaijan)	MF	Abdulla Abatsiyev	4	0	0	0	0	0	4	0
			TOTALS	88	6	9	0	8	0	105	6

== Notes ==
- Qarabağ have played their home games at the Tofiq Bahramov Stadium since 1993 due to the ongoing situation in Quzanlı.
