= 2014–15 Azerbaijan Cup =

Tournament details
- Country: Azerbaijan
- Teams: 18

Final positions
- Champions: Qarabağ
- Runners-up: Neftchi Baku

Tournament statistics
- Matches played: 23
- Goals scored: 52 (2.26 per match)
- Top goal scorer: Vüqar Nadirov (5)

The 2014–15 Azerbaijan Cup was the 23rd season of the annual cup competition in Azerbaijan. The final of the cup has been played on 3 June 2015.

== First round ==
The First Round games were drawn on 15 October 2014.

22 October 2014 Match 1	Qaradağ (2)	1 – 0	Zira (2)	Baku
14:00 AZST (UTC+5)	Nuriyev 16' (pen.)	Summary	T. Adigozelo (red card) 54'	Stadium: Dalga Arena; Referee: İnqilab Məmmədov

22 October 2014 Match 2	Lokomotiv-Bilajary (2)	0 – 1	MOIK Baku (2)	Baku
14:00 AZST (UTC+5)		Summary	Nəcəfov 53'	Stadium: FC Baku Training Ground; Referee: Rəşad Əhmədov

== Second round ==
The Two winners of the First Round will progress to the Second Round, which was drawn on 15 October 2014.

3 December 2014 Match 3	Neftchi Baku (1)	3 – 0	Qaradağ (2)	Baku
13:00 AZT (UTC+4)	Nfor 17'; Cauê (yellow card) 68'; Qurbanov 75'; Denis 78'	Summary	A.Häsänov (yellow card) 68'	Stadium: Ismat Gayibov Stadium; Attendance: 300; Referee: Vusal Aliyev

3 December 2014 Match 4	Qarabağ (1)	4 – 2	MOIK Baku (2)	Baku
15:30 AZT (UTC+4)	Emeghara 6'; Richard 7'; Veliyev (yellow card) 33'; Medvedev 49'; S.Aliyev (yellow card) 52'; Nadirov 71'	Summary	Qəvami 35'; Nəcəfov 88'	Stadium: Tofiq Bahramov Stadium^{1} Attendance: 100; Referee: Xalil Xälilov

3 December 2014 Match 5	Gabala (1)	3 – 0	Ağsu (2)	Qabala
15:00 AZT (UTC+4)	Soltanov 2', 22'; Farkaš 64'	Summary	N.Karimi (yellow card) 39'	Stadium: Gabala City Stadium; Attendance: 400; Referee: Fariz Yusifov

3 December 2014 Match 6	Simurq (1)	6 – 0	Ravan Baku (2)	Zaqatala
17:00 AZT (UTC+4)	Ćeran 9', 57'; Zargarov (yellow card) 24'; Stanojević 59'; Gökdemir 60'; Eyyubov (yellow card) 67' (goal) 75'; Poljak 82'; Weitzman (yellow card) 84'	Summary	O.Hasanov (yellow card) 29' (yellow-red card) 55'	Stadium: Zaqatala City Stadium

3 December 2014 Match 7	Sumgayit (1)	0 – 0 (a.e.t.) (3 – 4 p)	Baku (1)	Sumqayit
15:00 AZT (UTC+4)	O.Aliyev (yellow card) 43'; N.Mammadov (yellow card) 61'; J.Hajiyev (yellow card) 65' (yellow-red card) 83'; B.Näsirov (yellow card) 68'	Summary	A.Guliyev (yellow card) 27'; V.Baybalayev (yellow card) 57'; N.Gurbanov (yellow card) 62'; Horvat (yellow card) 82'	Stadium: Kapital Bank Arena; Attendance: 300; Referee: Rahim Häsänov
	Penalties
	(penalty scored); Aliyev (penalty missed); Nasirov (penalty scored); Mikayilov (penalty scored); Poladov (penalty missed); Hüseynov (penalty missed)		Horvat (penalty scored); Gurbanov (penalty missed); Madatov (penalty scored); Baybalayev (penalty scored); Jabá (penalty missed); Pelagias (penalty scored)

3 December 2014 Match 8	Neftchala (2)	1 – 2	AZAL (1)	Neftçala
13:00 AZT (UTC+4)	Aliyev 9'; M.Bädälbäyli (yellow card) 21'; R.Kärimov (yellow card) 67'; M.Şahquliyev (yellow card) 82'; V.Güläliyev (yellow card) 86'; E.Adışirinli (red card) 90+4'	Summary	Eduardo (yellow card) 17'; Mombongo-Dues 88'; Kasradze 90+2'; S.Rahimov (yellow card) 90+2'; Juanfran (red card) 90+4'	Stadium: Nariman Narimanov Stadium; Attendance: 100; Referee: Ingilab Mämmädov

3 December 2014 Match 9	Khazar Lankaran (1)	Walkover^{2}	Araz-Naxçıvan (1)	Lankaran
18:00 AZT (UTC+4)		[ Summary]		Stadium: Lankaran City Stadium

3 December 2014 Match 10	Shahdag Qusar (2)	0 – 3	Inter Baku (1)	Qusar
18:00 AZT (UTC+4)	D.Yusupov (yellow card) 64'	Summary	Tskhadadze 11' (pen.); E.Mammadov 40'; Abbasov 90'	Stadium: Shovkat Ordukhanov Stadium; Attendance: 200

== Quarterfinals ==
The eight winners from the Second Round are drawn into four two-legged ties.

4 March 2015 Match 11 First leg	Neftchi Baku (1)	0 – 0	AZAL (1)	Baku
17:00 AZT (UTC+4)	Aliyev (yellow card) 34'; Ramos (yellow card) 47'; Flavinho (yellow card) 82'	Summary	Kļava (yellow card) 49'; V.Igbekoi (yellow card) 65'	Stadium: Bakcell Arena; Attendance: 1,000; Referee: Ingilab Mämmädov

13 March 2015 Match 11 Second leg	AZAL (1)	0 – 1 (0 – 1 agg.)	Neftchi Baku (1)	Baku
15:00 AZT (UTC+4)	Kutsenko (yellow card) 26'	Summary	Wobay 19'; S.Masimov (yellow card) 25'; Ramos (yellow card) 45'; M.Isayev (yellow card) 47'; Yunuszade (yellow card) 63'	Stadium: AZAL Arena; Attendance: 400; Referee: Ingilab Mämmädov

4 March 2015 Match 12 First leg	Inter Baku (1)	2 – 0	Khazar Lankaran (1)	Baku
17:00 AZT (UTC+4)	D.Meza (yellow card) 38'; Álvaro 41'; Sankoh 69' (o.g.); Dashdemirov (yellow card) 73'; Salukvadze (yellow card) 77'	Summary	E.Mirzäyev (yellow card) 29'; S.Tounkara (yellow card) 72'	Stadium: Inter Arena; Attendance: 1,000; Referee: Orkhan Mämmädov

13 March 2015 Match 12 Second leg	Khazar Lankaran (1)	0 – 3 (0 – 5 agg.)	Inter Baku (1)	Lankaran
17:00 AZT (UTC+4)	Sankoh (yellow card) 14'	Summary	A.Mammadov 22'; J.Diniyev (yellow card) 32'; Aghayev (yellow card) 34'; Dashdemirov 74'; Nildo (yellow card) 87'; Ismayilov 90+1'	Stadium: Lankaran City Stadium; Attendance: 1,000; Referee: Rahim Häsänov

4 March 2015 Match 13 First leg	Qarabağ (1)	3 – 0	Baku (1)	Baku
17:00 AZT (UTC+4)	Reynaldo 6', 32'; Nadirov 24'; Teli (yellow card) 66'	Summary		Stadium: Tofiq Bahramov Stadium^{1} Attendance: 500; Referee: Vusal Äliyev

13 March 2015 Match 13 Second leg	Baku (1)	1 – 4 (1 – 7 agg.)	Qarabağ (1)	Baku
15:00 AZT (UTC+4)	Madatov 5' G.Aliyev (yellow card) 9'	Summary	Nadirov 12', 58', 69'; Garayev (yellow card) 27'; Taghiyev 56'	Stadium: Tofiq Bahramov Stadium; Attendance: 300; Referee: Xalili Xälilov

4 March 2015 Match 14 First leg	Gabala (1)	0 – 3	Simurq (1)	Qabala
19:00 AZT (UTC+4)	U.Abbasov (yellow card) 41'; Dodô (yellow card) 61'	Summary	Ćeran 17', 55'; S.Zargarov (yellow card) 20'; Melli (yellow card) 30'; Lambot 57'; T.Akhundov (yellow card) 81'	Stadium: Gabala City Stadium; Attendance: 400; Referee: Aliyar Ağayev

13 March 2015 Match 14 Second leg	Simurq (1)	0 – 0 (3 – 0 agg.)	Gabala (1)	Zaqatala
17:00 AZT (UTC+4)	V.Mustafayev (yellow card) 4'; Qirtimov (yellow card) 59'	Summary	B.Soltanov (yellow card) 32'; Mendy (yellow card) 57'; Huseynov (yellow card) 75'; Santos (yellow card) 84'	Stadium: Zaqatala City Stadium; Attendance: 2,000; Referee: Ramil Diniyev

== Semifinals ==
The four winners from the Quarterfinals were drawn into two two-legged ties.

13 April 2015 Match 15 First leg	Qarabağ (1)	1 – 0	Simurq (1)	Baku
18:00 AZST (UTC+5)	Taghiyev 15'; Medvedev (yellow card) 27'	Summary	Qirtimov (yellow card) 66'	Stadium: Tofiq Bahramov Stadium^{1} Attendance: 1,400; Referee: Aliyar Ağayev

21 April 2015 Match 15 Second leg	Simurq (1)	0 – 0 (0 – 1 agg.)	Qarabağ (1)	Zaqatala
18:00 AZST (UTC+5)	E.Abdullayev (yellow card) 85'; Kapsa (yellow card) 90+3'	Summary	George (yellow card) 40'	Stadium: Zaqatala City Stadium; Attendance: 3,000; Referee: Orkhan Mämmädov

13 April 2015 Match 16 First leg	Neftchi Baku (1)	2 – 0	Inter Baku (1)	Baku
19:00 AZST (UTC+5)	Yunuszade (yellow card) 12'; Canales 19', 71'; Seyidov (yellow card) 62'	Summary	J.Diniyev (yellow card) 8'; Aghayev (yellow card) 20'	Stadium: Bakcell Arena; Attendance: 1,500; Referee: Ingilab Mämmädov

21 April 2015 Match 16 Second leg	Inter Baku (1)	2 – 1 (2 – 3 agg.)	Neftchi Baku (1)	Baku
19:00 AZST (UTC+5)	Abatsiyev (yellow card) 17'; Dashdemirov 37'; D.Meza (yellow card) 45+1'; Tskhadadze 57'	Summary	E.Mehdiyev (yellow card) 19'; Canales 27'; Ramos (yellow card) 57'; A.Guliyev (yellow card) 82'; Abdullayev (yellow card) 90+3'	Stadium: Inter Arena; Attendance: 1,500; Referee: Elvin Äsgärov

== Final ==
3 June 2015
20:00 AZST (UTC+5)

Qarabağ	3 – 1	Neftchi Baku
Reynaldo 5', 39'; Muarem 85'	Summary	Nfor 77'

Gabala City Stadium, Qabala
Attendance: 4,500
Referee: Rähim Häsänov

== Scorers ==
5 goals:

- (Azerbaijan) Vüqar Nadirov, Qarabağ

4 goals:

- (Serbia) Dragan Ćeran, Simurq
- (Brazil) Reynaldo, Qarabağ

3 goals:

- (Chile) Nicolás Canales, Neftchi Baku

2 goals:

- (Azerbaijan) Bakhtiyar Soltanov, Gabala
- (Azerbaijan) Arif Dashdemirov, Inter Baku
- (Georgia (country)) Bachana Tskhadadze, Inter Baku
- (Azerbaijan) Röyal Nəcəfov, MOIK Baku
- (Cameroon) Ernest Nfor, Neftchi Baku
- (Azerbaijan) Javid Taghiyev, Qarabağ

1 goal:

- (Democratic Republic of the Congo) Freddy Mombongo-Dues, AZAL
- (Georgia (country)) Lasha Kasradze, AZAL
- (Slovakia) Pavol Farkaš, Gabala
- (Azerbaijan) Mirsahib Abbasov, Inter Baku
- (Azerbaijan) Afran Ismayilov, Inter Baku
- (Azerbaijan) Asif Mammadov, Inter Baku
- (Azerbaijan) Elvin Mammadov, Inter Baku
- (Spain) Mikel Álvaro, Inter Baku
- (Azerbaijan) Räfael Qävami, MOIK Baku
- (Azerbaijan) Mahammad Aliyev, Neftchala
- (Azerbaijan) Ruslan Qurbanov, Neftchi Baku
- (Brazil) Denis Silva, Neftchi Baku
- (Sierra Leone) Julius Wobay, Neftchi Baku
- (Azerbaijan) Maksim Medvedev, Qarabağ
- (Brazil) Richard Almeida, Qarabağ
- (North Macedonia) Muarem Muarem, Qarabağ
- (Switzerland) Innocent Emeghara, Qarabağ
- (Azerbaijan) Ramil Nuriyev, Qaradağ
- (Azerbaijan) Ali Gökdemir, Simurq
- (Azerbaijan) Rashad Eyyubov, Simurq
- (Belgium) Benjamin Lambot, Simurq
- (Croatia) Stjepan Poljak, Simurq
- (Serbia) Marko Stanojević, Simurq

Own goals:

- (Sierra Leone) Alfred Sankoh (4 March 2015 vs Inter Baku)

== Notes ==
- Qarabağ have played their home games at the Tofiq Bahramov Stadium since 1993 due to the ongoing situation in Quzanlı.
- Following Araz-Naxçıvan's withdrawal from the Azerbaijan Premier League, Khazar Lankaran were awarded the victory.
