= César Meza Colli =

Paraguayan footballer (born 1991)

César Meza
Personal information
- Full name: Cesar Daniel Meza Colli
- Date of birth: 5 October 1991 (age 35)
- Place of birth: Asunción, Paraguay
- Height: 1.72 m (5 ft 8 in)
- Positions: Midfielder; forward

Youth career
- Atromitos
- 2008: Ethnikos Piraeus
- 2008–2009: PAS Giannina
- 2009–2011: Cesena

Senior career*
Years	Team	Apps	(Gls)
2011–2013	Cesena	2	(0)
2012	→ Alavés (loan)	16	(4)
2012–2013	→ Pavia (loan)	17	(3)
2013–2015	Inter Baku	25	(3)
2016	Inter Baku	15	(0)
2016–2017	Zira	20	(4)
2018	Keşla	11	(0)
2018–	Universitatea Craiova	15	(0)
2019–2020	→ Keşla (loan)	16	(4)
2020–2021	Keşla	19	(3)
2021–2023	Neftçi	41	(6)
2023	Ohod	0	(0)
2024	Zira	8	(2)
2024–2025	Araz-Naxçıvan	17	(0)
- * Club domestic league appearances and goals as of 19 June 2025

Cesar Daniel Meza Colli (born 5 October 1991) is a Paraguayan professional footballer who plays as a midfielder, most recently for Araz-Naxçıvan.

== Career ==
Colli made his debut on 21 September 2011 for Cesena, against Lazio.

On 5 January 2012, he left for Deportivo Alavés. On 2 August 2012 he was signed by A.C. Pavia in temporary deal for undisclosed fee, which deducted from the transfer fee of another player.

On 3 September 2013, César and his brother David signed for Azerbaijan Premier League side Inter Baku in a one-year contract. Meza signed a new 1-year contract with Inter Baku in May 2014.

After leaving Inter Baku in the summer of 2015, Colli signed a six-month contract with Inter Baku on 22 January 2016. Six-months later Colli signed a one-year contract with Zira FK.

On 6 February 2018, Keşla FK announced the signing of Colli on a contract until the end of the 2017–18 season.

On 6 August 2018, Universitatea Craiova announced the signing of Colli on a three-year contract.

On 22 July 2019, Keşla FK announced the signing of Colli on one-year long loan. On 18 September 2020, Colli returned to Keşla on a contract until the end of the 2020–21 season.

On 12 June 2021, Neftçi PFK announced the signing of Colli to a two-year contract.

On 21 June 2023, Colli joined Saudi First Division side Ohod.

On 1 March 2024, Zira announced the return of Meza Colli on a contract until the end of the season.

On 15 October 2024 Azerbaijan First League club Araz-Naxçıvan PFK signed a contract with Colli until the end of the season. On 18 June 2025, Araz announced the departure of Colli after his contract had expired.

== Career statistics ==
As of match played 24 May 2021

Club	Season	League			National Cup		Continental		Total	
Club	Season	Division	Apps	Goals	Apps	Goals	Apps	Goals	Apps	Goals
Cesena	2011–12	Serie A	2	0	1	0	–		3	0
Cesena	2012–13	Serie B	0	0	0	0	—		0	0
Cesena	Total		2	0	1	0	-	-	3	0
Alavés (loan)	2011–12	Segunda División B	16	4	0	0	–		16	4
Pavia (loan)	2012–13	Lega Pro	17	3			–		17	3
Inter Baku	2013–14	Azerbaijan Premier League	15	0	3	0	—		18	0
Inter Baku	2014–15	Azerbaijan Premier League	10	3	2	0	—		12	3
Inter Baku	2015–16	Azerbaijan Premier League	15	0	2	2	—		17	2
Inter Baku	Total		40	3	7	2	-	-	47	5
Zira	2016–17	Azerbaijan Premier League	20	4	2	0	–		22	4
Keşla	2017–18	Azerbaijan Premier League	11	0	3	2	–		14	2
Keşla	2018–19	Azerbaijan Premier League	0	0	0	0	2	2	2	2
Keşla	Total		11	0	3	2	2	2	16	4
Universitatea Craiova	2018–19	Liga I	15	0	2	0	0	0	17	0
Universitatea Craiova	2019–20	Liga I	0	0	0	0	0	0	0	0
Universitatea Craiova	Total		15	0	2	0	0	0	17	0
Keşla (loan)	2019–20	Azerbaijan Premier League	16	3	3	0	–		19	3
Keşla	2020–21	Azerbaijan Premier League	19	3	5	4	–		24	7
Career total			157	21	23	8	2	2	182	31
