= Nizami Hajiyev =

Azerbaijani footballer (born 1988)

Personal information
- Full name: Nizami Ogtay oglu Hajiyev
- Date of birth: 8 February 1988 (age 38)
- Place of birth: Baku, Azerbaijan SSR, Soviet Union
- Height: 1.73 m (5 ft 8 in)
- Position: Midfielder

Senior career*
Years	Team	Apps	(Gls)
2005–2007	Olimpik Baku	36	(4)
2007–2008	Inter Baku	14	(4)
2008–2009	Olimpik Baku	21	(1)
2009–2010	Khazar Lankaran	19	(0)
2010–2013	Inter Baku	53	(7)
2011	→ MOIK Baku (loan)	12	(0)
2013–2014	Gabala	29	(0)
2014–2017	Keshla	77	(17)

International career^{‡}
2006–2008	Azerbaijan U19	9	(3)
2008–2010	Azerbaijan U21	10	(1)
2011–2012	Azerbaijan	2	(1)
- * Club domestic league appearances and goals as of 30 November 2017 ‡ National team caps and goals as of 1 December 2017

Nizami Hajiyev (Azerbaijani: Nizami Hacıyev; born 8 February 1988) is an Azerbaijani football midfielder who is currently banned from football by the AFFA.

== Career ==
=== Club ===
Hajiyev started his career with Olimpik Baku in 2006, before moving in 2008 to Khazar Lankaran.

In May 2013 Hajiyev moved from Keshla and signed a one-year contract with Gabala. Hajiyev left Gabala on 7 August 2014.

On 30 November 2017, Keshla FK confirmed that they had terminated Hajiyev's contract due to suspicion of manipulating matches. The following day, 1 December 2017, Hajiyev was banned from all footballing activities by the AFFA.

=== International ===
He is also a member of the Azerbaijan national under-21 football team, and played for Azerbaijan's U21 side in the Euro 2009–2010 qualifiers against Austria.

== Career statistics ==
=== Club ===
As of Match played 25 November 2017

Appearances and goals by club, season and competition
Club	Season	League			National Cup		Continental		Other		Total	
Club	Season	Division	Apps	Goals	Apps	Goals	Apps	Goals	Apps	Goals	Apps	Goals
Olimpik Baku	2005–06	Azerbaijan Premier League	15	2			-		-		15	2
Olimpik Baku	2006–07	Azerbaijan Premier League	21	2			-		-		21	2
Olimpik Baku	Total		36	4			-	-	-	-	36	4
Inter Baku	2007–08	Azerbaijan Premier League	14	4			-		-		14	4
Olimpik Baku	2008–09	Azerbaijan Premier League	18	1			-		-		18	1
Khazar Lankaran	2009–10	Azerbaijan Premier League	19	0	4	0	-		-		23	0
Inter Baku	2010–11	Azerbaijan Premier League	1	0	0	0	2	1	-		3	1
Inter Baku	2011–12	Azerbaijan Premier League	27	5	4	1	-		-		31	6
Inter Baku	2012–13	Azerbaijan Premier League	20	2	2	1	4	2	-		26	5
Inter Baku	Total		48	7	6	2	6	3	-	-	60	12
MOIK Baku (Loan)	2010–11	Azerbaijan Premier League	12	0	0	0	-		-		12	0
Gabala	2013–14	Azerbaijan Premier League	29	0	5	2	-		-		34	2
Gabala	2014–15	Azerbaijan Premier League	0	0	0	0	2	0	-		2	0
Gabala	Total		29	0	5	0	2	0	-	-	36	2
Keshla	2014–15	Azerbaijan Premier League	20	2	3	0	0	0	-		23	2
Keshla	2015–16	Azerbaijan Premier League	25	6	2	0	6	0	-		33	6
Keshla	2016–17	Azerbaijan Premier League	24	7	3	1	-		-		27	8
Keshla	2017–18	Azerbaijan Premier League	8	2	0	0	4	1	-		12	3
Keshla	Total		77	17	8	1	10	1	-	-	95	19
Career total			253	33	23	5	18	4	-	-	294	42

=== International ===
Azerbaijan
Year	Apps	Goals
2011	1	0
2012	1	1
Total	2	1

Statistics accurate as of match played 27 February 2012

=== International goals ===
#	Date	Venue	Opponent	Score	Result	Competition
1.	27 February 2012	Dubai, United Arab Emirates	India	3-0	3-0	Friendly
