= David Meza (footballer) =

Paraguayan footballer (born 1988)

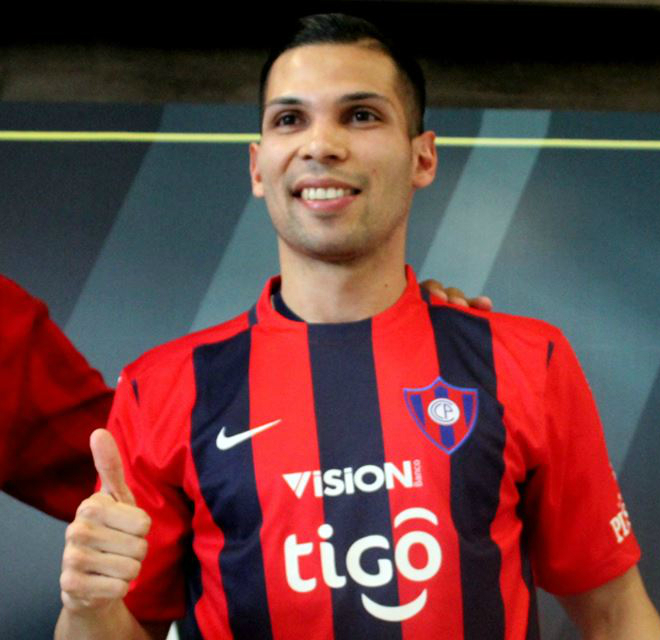

Personal information
- Full name: Derlis David Meza Colli
- Date of birth: 15 August 1988 (age 38)
- Place of birth: Asunción, Paraguay
- Height: 1.79 m (5 ft 10 in)
- Position: Central midfielder

Team information
- Current team: ŁKS Łódź (assistant)

Youth career
- 2000–2007: L'Escala

Senior career*
Years	Team	Apps	(Gls)
2007–2010	Atromitos	2	(0)
2008	→ Ethnikos Piraeus (loan)	16	(0)
2008–2009	→ PAS Giannina (loan)	15	(0)
2009–2010	→ Messiniakos (loan)	32	(11)
2010–2013	Cesena	23	(1)
2011–2012	→ Pavia (loan)	37	(1)
2013–2015	Inter Baku	56	(4)
2015	Gabala	4	(0)
2016	Cerro Porteño	15	(0)
2017–2018	Neftchi Baku	26	(1)
2019–2020	Petrolul Ploiești	26	(1)
2020–2023	Argeș Pitești	107	(1)
2023	Ohod	4	(0)

Managerial career
- 2024–2025: PAS Giannina (assistant)
- 2025–: ŁKS Łódź (assistant)
- * Club domestic league appearances and goals

Derlis David Meza Colli (born 15 August 1988), simply known as David Meza, is a Paraguayan former professional footballer who played as a central midfielder who is currently the assistant coach of Polish club ŁKS Łódź.

== Playing career ==
Meza has played the 2008–09 season with PAS Giannina of Beta Ethniki on loan from his club Atromitos. On 3 September 2013 David, and his brother César, signed for Azerbaijan Premier League side Inter Baku on a one-year contract. Meza signed a new 1-year contract with Inter Baku in May 2014. On 31 August 2015, Meza signed a one-year contract with another Azerbaijan Premier League side, Gabala. On 20 December 2015, Meza was released from his Gabala contract six-months early.

On 6 January 2016, Meza signed for Cerro Porteño.

On 30 July 2017, Meza signed a one-year contract with Neftchi Baku.

On 27 July 2019, Meza was announced as a member of Petrolul Ploiești squad for the 2019–20 season.

On 16 July 2023, Meza joined Saudi First Division side Ohod.

== Coaching career ==
On 26 October 2024, Meza was announced as part of new PAS Giannina head coach, Ariel Galeano's, coaching staff.

On 25 February 2025, he followed Galeano to work under him as an assistant at Polish second-tier club ŁKS Łódź.
