= Şamaxı FK =

Association football club in Azerbaijan

Şamaxı
- Full name: Şamaxı Futbol Klubu
- Nickname: Şirlər (The Lions)
- Founded: 1997; 29 years ago, as Khazar University
- Ground: Shamakhi City Stadium
- Capacity: 2,176
- Chairman of the Board: Elchin Usub
- Manager: Azer Bagirov
- League: Azerbaijan Premier League
- 2025–26: Azerbaijan Premier League, 8th of 12
- Website: www.shamakhifc.az
Home colours	Away colours

Şamaxı Futbol Klubu (pronounced [ʃɑmɑˈxɯ], lit. 'Shamakhi Football Club') is an Azerbaijani professional football club based in Shamakhi, which competes in the Azerbaijan Premier League. The club has won the Premier League title twice. Previously the club was known as Xəzər Universiteti FK (1999–2004), İnter Bakı PİK (2004–2017) and Keşlə FK (2017–2022).

== History ==
=== Early years (1997–2004) ===
The club has been functioning since 1997, initially as an amateur side that shared its name with Khazar University, the first private university in Azerbaijan, which founded the club. In 1999, Khazar University began to play in the Azerbaijan Premier League, finishing eleventh. In subsequent years, Inter finished in 7th place (2000/01 season) and 3rd place (2003–04 season).

In the 2003–04 season, the team finished in fourth place, thereby qualifying for the UEFA Intertoto Cup for the first time. In the first round of the 2004 UEFA Intertoto Cup, they defeated Bregenz of Austria 3–0 on a forfeiture in the first leg, and 2–1 in the second leg. In the second round, they played Tampere United of Finland, losing the first leg 0–3; winning the return leg, played in Baku, 1–0; but going out on aggregate 1–3.

=== The Double and Tskhadadze years (2004–2014) ===
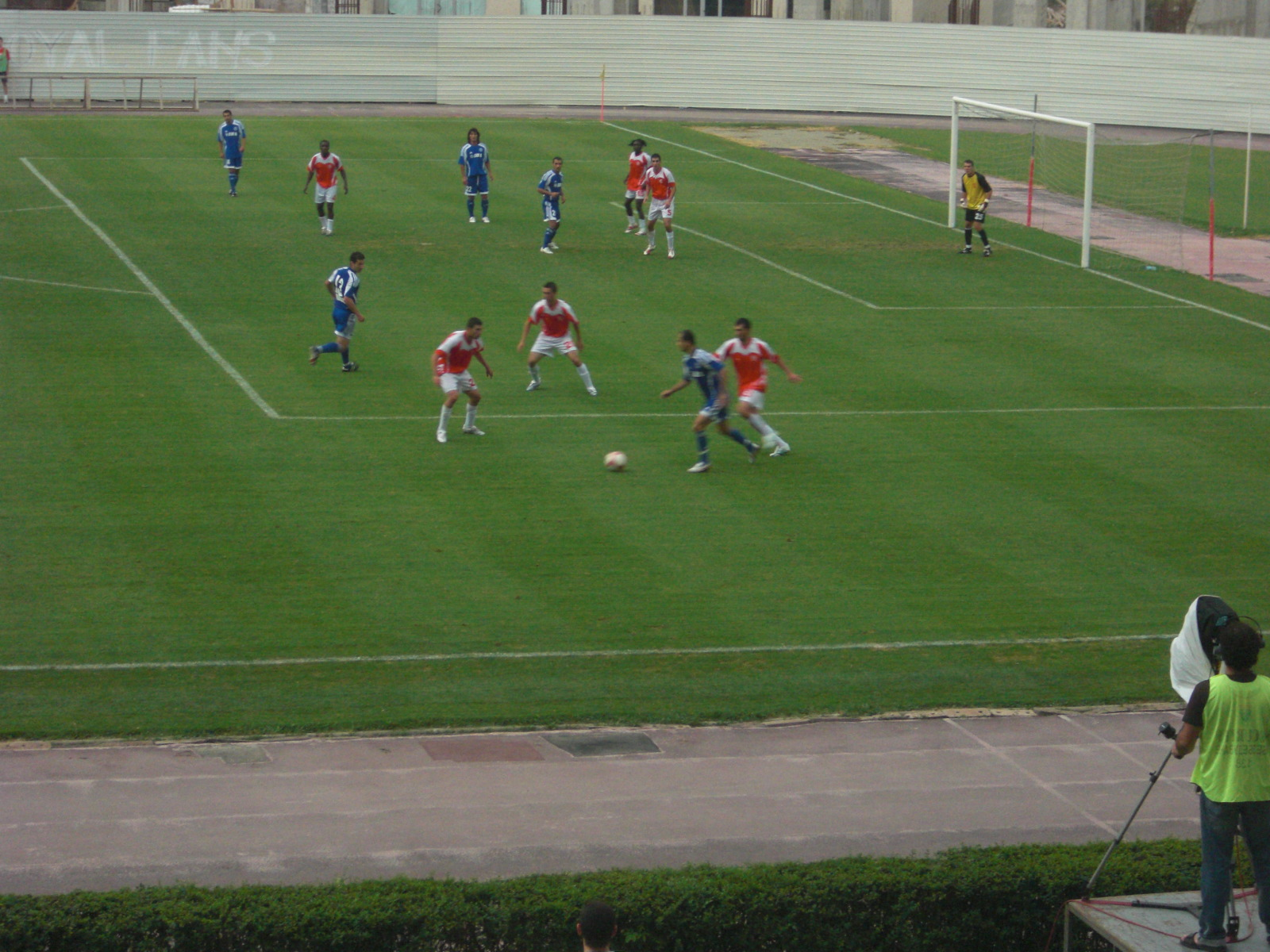
UEFA Champions League 2008–2009 Qualifying match in Skopje, Macedonia; FK Rabotnicki (Macedonia) – Inter Baku (Azerbaijan) 1–1

In the summer of 2004, all rights of the Khazar University club were transferred to the newly created Inter Baku Professional Football Club, and the team participated in the 13th championship of the Azerbaijani Premier League under the name of Inter Baku. Later in 2004, certain structural changes were made in the club's management, and Inter Baku was renamed the Inter Professional Club, finishing the 2004–2005 season in seventh place. Inter's progression up the standings continued in the 14th iteration of the Azerbaijan Premier League when Inter finished in fourth place.

The club finished fourth again in 2006–07, and first in 2007–08. Following its championship season, Inter qualified for its first-ever appearance in the UEFA Champions League in 2008 and advanced to the second qualifying round by defeating Rabotnički of the Republic of Macedonia on away goals.

2009 saw Inter Baku retain the Azerbaijan Premier League title, securing it for the second time in the club's history. The club's Champions League campaign was less successful – losing to Lech Poznań away on penalties. In 2011, Inter Baku also managed to win the CIS Cup after defeating Shakhtyor Soligorsk in the final.

In 2012, the club recorded an Azerbaijani record for the biggest win in a European competition by beating Narva Trans 5–0 in Estonia. The club had started the 2013–14 season with a three-game losing streak, setting a record for worst start to a season in its history. However, the team managed to clinch second spot in the league.

=== Downturn and financial difficulties of Inter Baku (2015–2017) ===
During the 2015–16 season, Inter started experiencing financial difficulties at the same time with its main sponsor, The International Bank of Azerbaijan. In December 2015, the club's president, Georgi Nikolov was replaced by Rashad Gasimov. On 31 March 2016, Inter Baku were banned from participating in the next UEFA club competition that they would qualify for in the next three seasons, covering the 2016/17, 2017/18 and 2018/19 seasons.

The situation continued during the 2016–17 season as Inter struggled to pay salaries to its players and make new transfers. Despite that, Inter was able to claim the bronze medal in the national championship and reach the semi-finals stage in the Cup. At the end of the season, IBA announced that it would no longer sponsor the club, and this led to new changes in the administration. Zaur Akhundov, former director of the National Futzal Federation, was appointed as the head of the supervisory board and Ramish Maliyev became the new executive director of the club. Despite the rumors about the liquidation, Inter was able to find sponsorship for the 2017–18 season and play in the Europe League, where it eliminated Serbian Mladost Lučani in the first qualifying round before getting eliminated by Fola Esch in the second round.

=== Keşlə FK (2017–2022) ===
On 28 October 2017, Inter Baku PIK officially changed its name to Keşlə FK. The club also replaced its logo and jersey colors. In its first match, Keşlə lost 0–2 against Kapaz. The next day, the team's manager Zaur Svanadze was replaced by Ramiz Mammadov. On 25 December 2017, Keşlə announced that Mammadov had become the club's Sporting Director, with Yuriy Maksymov coming in as the club's new manager. On 17 July 2018, Maksymov was sacked, and Mladen Milinković appointed the new manager on 25 July 2018. On 29 October 2018, Milinković was sacked as manager, with Tarlan Ahmadov being appointed as his replacement on 30 October 2018. On 8 August 2020, Ahmadov left Keşlə.

On 16 August 2020, Keşlə announced Yunis Huseynov's appointment as the new manager. On 24 January 2021, Huseynov resigned; Sanan Gurbanov was appointed the club's new manager on 25 January 2021.

=== Şamaxı FK (2022–present) ===
On 6 April 2022, the Azerbaijan Premier League approved the name change of Keşlə FK to Şamaxı FK.

=== Domestic history ===
Team name	Season	League									Azerbaijan Cup	Top goalscorer	
Team name		Div.	Pos.	Pl.	W	D	L	GS	GA	P	Azerbaijan Cup	Name	League
Xəzər Universiteti	1999–2000	1st	11th	22	5	3	14	19	41	18	1/8 Finals	(Azerbaijan) Samir Alakbarov	7
Xəzər Universiteti	2000–01	1st	7th	20	9	2	9	26	38	29	1/8 Finals	(Azerbaijan) R. Nasibov	8
Xəzər Universiteti	2001–02	1st	6th	22	11	3	8	33	24	36	Semi-finals		
Xəzər Universiteti	2002–03	Season was not played											
Xəzər Universiteti	2003–04	1st	4th	26	15	6	5	43	16	51	1/8 Finals	(Georgia (country)) A. Sokhadze	6
İnter Bakı	2004–05	1st	7th	34	19	9	6	44	24	66	Runner-up	(Azerbaijan) Elshan Mammadov	10
İnter Bakı	2005–06	1st	4th	26	14	8	4	35	14	50	Quarter-finals	(Nigeria) Lucky Idahor	6
İnter Bakı	2006–07	1st	4th	24	13	6	5	36	12	45	Semi-finals	(Azerbaijan) Samir Aliyev	6
İnter Bakı	2007–08	1st	1st	26	18	4	4	55	18	58	Runner-up	(Azerbaijan) Khagani Mammadov	19
İnter Bakı	2008–09	1st	2nd	26	18	7	1	54	16	61	Runner-up	(Uruguay) Walter Guglielmone	17
İnter Bakı	2009–10	1st	1st	32	22	12	8	58	37	78	Semi-finals	(Lithuania) Robertas Poškus	12
İnter Bakı	2010–11	1st	5th	32	13	10	9	29	24	49	Runner-up	(Lithuania) Robertas Poškus	5
İnter Bakı	2011–12	1st	3rd	32	16	8	8	29	21	56	Semi-finals	(Georgia (country)) Bachana Tskhadadze	7
İnter Bakı	2012–13	1st	3rd	32	16	9	7	38	22	57	Quarter-finals	(Georgia (country)) Bachana Tskhadadze	8
İnter Bakı	2013–14	1st	2nd	36	20	7	9	60	37	67	Quarter-finals	(Azerbaijan) Vagif Javadov	16
İnter Bakı	2014–15	1st	2nd	32	17	12	3	55	20	63	Semi-finals	(Spain) Mikel Álvaro	9
İnter Bakı	2015–16	1st	4th	36	16	11	9	39	28	59	Semi-finals	(Azerbaijan) Nizami Hajiyev (Azerbaijan) Mirsahib Abbasov	6
İnter Bakı	2016–17	1st	3rd	28	11	10	7	39	33	43	Semi-finals	(Azerbaijan) Rauf Aliyev	11
Keşlə	2017–18	1st	6th	28	8	7	13	29	39	31	Winner	(Azerbaijan) Pardis Fardjad-Azad (Romania) Adrian Scarlatache (Azerbaijan) Slavik Alkhasov	4
Keşlə	2018–19	1st	8th	28	6	5	17	29	45	23	Quarter-finals	(Azerbaijan) Amil Yunanov (Togo) Jonathan Ayité	5
Keşlə	2019–20	1st	3rd	20	8	6	6	27	21	30	Quarter-finals	(Paraguay) Lorenzo Frutos	6
Keşlə	2020–21	1st	6th	28	5	11	12	25	40	26	Winner	(Azerbaijan) Azer Salahli	5
Şamaxı	2021–22	1st	7th	28	5	7	16	25	49	22	Quarter-finals	(Brazil) Felipe Santos	6
Şamaxı	2022–23	1st	10th	36	4	13	19	26	52	25	Semi-finals	(Azerbaijan) Amil Yunanov	7
Şamaxı	2023–24	2nd	1st	16	9	2	19	60	22	57	1/8 finals		
Şamaxı	2024–25	1st	7th	36	9	9	18	32	46	36	1/8 finals		

=== European history ===
As of match played 29 July 2021

Competition	Pld	W	D	L	GF	GA
UEFA Champions League	6	1	3	2	3	5
UEFA Europa League	27	12	8	7	37	29
UEFA Europa Conference League	2	0	0	2	2	7
UEFA Intertoto Cup	4	3	0	1	6	4
Total	39	16	11	12	48	45

Games of Shamakhi in UEFA competitions
Season	Competition	Round	Club	Home	Away	Aggregate
2004	Intertoto Cup	R1	(Austria) Bregenz	2–1	3–0	5–1
2004	Intertoto Cup	R2	(Finland) Tampere United	1–0	0–3	1–3
2008–09	Champions League	1Q	(North Macedonia) Rabotnički	0–0	1–1	1–1(a)
2008–09	Champions League	2Q	(Serbia) Partizan	1–1	0–2	1–3
2009–10	Europa League	2Q	(Slovakia) Spartak Trnava	1–2	1–3	2–5
2010–11	Champions League	2Q	(Poland) Lech Poznań	0–1	1–0	1–1 (8–9 p)
2012–13	Europa League	1Q	(Estonia) Narva Trans	5–0	2–0	7–0
2012–13	Europa League	2Q	(Greece) Asteras Tripolis	1–1	1–1	2–2 (2–4 p)
2013–14	Europa League	1Q	(Finland) IFK Mariehamn	1–1	2–0	3–1
2013–14	Europa League	2Q	(Norway) Tromsø	1–0	0–2	1–2
2014–15	Europa League	1Q	(Moldova) Tiraspol	3–1	3–2	6–3
2014–15	Europa League	2Q	(Sweden) IF Elfsborg	0–1	1–0	1–1 (3–4 p)
2015–16	Europa League	1Q	(Albania) Laçi	0–0	1–1	1–1 (a)
2015–16	Europa League	2Q	(Iceland) FH	2–2	2–1	4–3
2015–16	Europa League	3Q	(Spain) Athletic Bilbao	0–0	0–2	0–2
2017–18	Europa League	1Q	(Serbia) Mladost Lučani	2–0	3–0	5–0
2017–18	Europa League	2Q	(Luxembourg) Fola Esch	1–0	1–4	2–4
2018–19	Europa League	1Q	(Malta) Balzan	2–1	1–4	3–5
2020–21	Europa League	1Q	(Albania) Laçi	0–0 (4–5 p)	—N/a	—N/a
2021–22	Europa Conference League	2Q	(Russia) Sochi	2–4	0–3	2–7

== Stadium ==
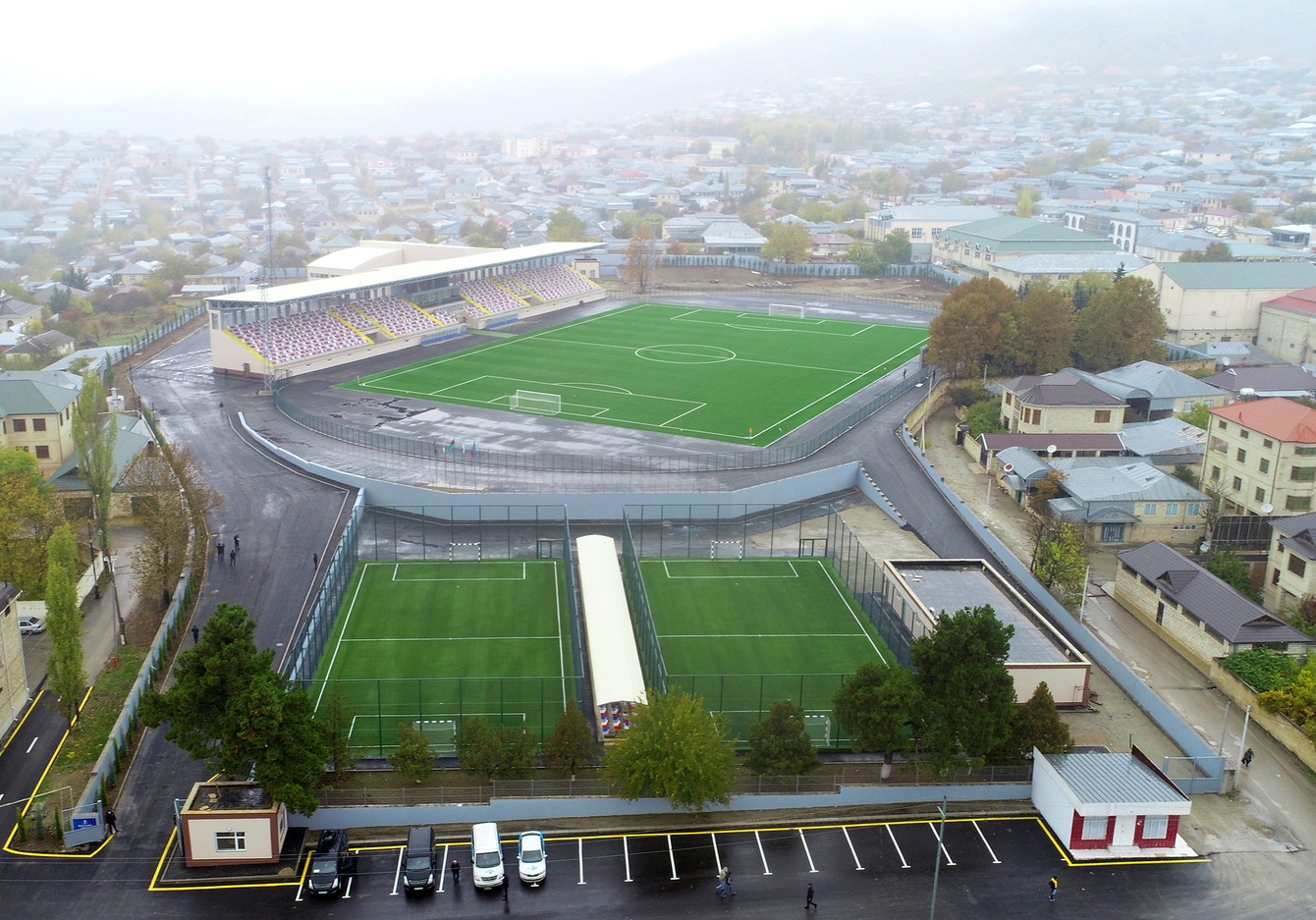
Shamakhi City Stadium

Shamakhi's home ground is Shamakhi City Stadium, which has a capacity of 2,200.

== Shirt sponsor and kit manufacturer ==
Years	Manufacturer	Sponsor
2004–2011	Adidas	IBA
2011–2015	Umbro	IBA
2015–2017	Joma	IBA
2017–2022	Joma	Samaya LTD
2022–2023	Joma	none
2023–2024	Kirpi Tekstil	none
2024–	Joma	none

== Players ==
Azerbaijani teams are limited to nine players without Azerbaijani citizenship. The squad list includes only the principal nationality of each player; several non-European players on the squad have dual citizenship with an EU country.

=== Current squad ===
As of 18 August 2026

Note: Flags indicate national team as defined under FIFA eligibility rules; some limited exceptions apply. Players may hold more than one non-FIFA nationality.

No.	Pos.	Nation	Player
1	GK	POR	Ricardo Fernandes (Captain)
2	DF	AZE	Fariz Xeyrullayev
3	DF	POR	João Oliveira
4	DF	POR	Rui Pacheco
5	DF	AZE	Emin Rüstəmov
7	MF	AZE	Emil Süleymanov
8	MF	ISR	David Dego
9	FW	GEO	Tornike Akhvlediani
10	MF	AZE	Edqar Adilkhanov
11	MF	MAR	Ayman Bouali
13	MF	POR	Ricardo Apolinário
14	FW	AZE	Ugur Cahangirov

No.	Pos.	Nation	Player
17	DF	AZE	Sənan Muradlı
19	FW	NGR	Abdullahi Shuaibu
25	MF	POR	Filipe Marques
52	DF	BEN	Abdoul Rachid Moumini
62	GK	AZE	Abdulla Seyidahmadov
66	MF	AZE	Ceyhun Bağırzadə
77	MF	AZE	Okan Tahmazli
80	MF	AZE	Habib Ismayilov
88	DF	AZE	Hacıəli Şirəliyev
96	GK	AZE	Nijat Qaragozlu
97	MF	AZE	Oruc Mammadov

== Club officials ==
=== Management ===
Position	Staff
Chairman of the Board	(Azerbaijan) Elchin Usub
General Manager	(Azerbaijan) Kamran Ismayılov
Press secretary	(Azerbaijan) Yusif Huseynov

=== Coaching staff ===
Position	Name
Head coach	(Azerbaijan) Aykhan Abbasov
Assistant coach	(Azerbaijan) Elnur Chodarov (Azerbaijan) Khayal Garayev (Azerbaijan) Vusal Garayev (Azerbaijan) Jeyhun Rzayev
Goalkeeping coach	(Azerbaijan) Kamil Gafarov

== Records ==
=== Top goalscorers ===
As of match played 22 May 2022

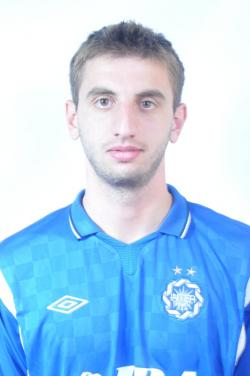
Bachana Tskhadadze is the clubs top goal scorer in history.

	Name	Years	League	Azerbaijan Cup	Europe	Total
1	(Georgia (country)) Bachana Tskhadadze	2011–2015	36 (116)	10 (20)	6 (11)	47 (147)
2	(Azerbaijan) Nizami Hajiyev	2007–2008; 2010–2013; 2014–2017	28 (139)	4 (22)	4 (16)	36 (177)
3	(Uruguay) Walter Guglielmone	2007–2009	28 (44)	4 (?)	1 (3)	33 (47+)
4	(Azerbaijan) Khagani Mammadov	2007–2009	22 (35)	3 (?)	0 (5)	25 (40+)
5	(Lithuania) Robertas Poškus	2009–2011	17 (49)	3 (5+)	0 (2)	20 (46+)
5	(Paraguay) César Meza	2013–2015, 2016; 2018, 2019–2021	10 (86)	8 (18)	2 (2)	20 (106)
5	(Azerbaijan) Vagif Javadov	2013–2014; 2018–2020	17 (52)	2 (7)	1 (5)	20 (64)
8	(Azerbaijan) Rauf Aliyev	2016–2017	12 (36)	3 (5)	2 (10)	17 (51)
9	(Latvia) Ģirts Karlsons	2009–2015	10 (63)	5 (7+)	1 (2)	16 (72+)
10	(Bulgaria) Petar Zlatinov	2008–2013	14 (107)	0 (9+)	1 (10)	15 (126+)

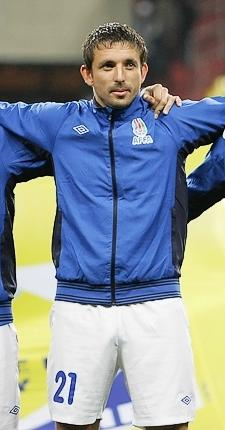
Volodimir Levin is the club's most capped player.

Top Ten Players With Most Appearances
Player		Period	Caps	Goals
1	(Azerbaijan) Volodimir Levin	2004–13	204	11
2	(Azerbaijan) Asif Mammadov	2008–10; 2011–2015	118	7
3	(Georgia (country)) Bachana Tskhadadze	2010–2015	117	47
4	(Georgia (country)) Giorgi Lomaia	2009–2016	108	0
5	(Azerbaijan) Arif Dashdemirov	2010–2015	98	5
6	(Bulgaria) Petar Zlatinov	2008–13	97	10
7	(Georgia (country)) Ilia Kandelaki	2010–13	75	3
8	(Azerbaijan) Elmar Bakhshiev	2004–07	74	1
9	(Latvia) Ģirts Karlsons	2009–12	73	36
10	(Czech Republic) Bronislav Červenka	2007–12	72	5

== Notable managers ==
Information correct as of match played 23 February 2019. Only competitive matches are counted.

Name	Nat.	From	To	P	W	D	L	GS	GA	%W	Honours	Notes
Ismail Aliyev	Azerbaijan	1997	1998	N/A	N/A	N/A	N/A	N/A	N/A	N/A		
Samir Alakbarov	Azerbaijan	1999	2000	N/A	N/A	N/A	N/A	N/A	N/A	N/A		
Boyukagha Aghayev	Azerbaijan	2001	2004	N/A	N/A	N/A	N/A	N/A	N/A	N/A		
Anatoly Konjkov	Ukraine	2004	2006	N/A	N/A	N/A	N/A	N/A	N/A	N/A		
Oleg Smolyaninov	Russia	2006	2006	N/A	N/A	N/A	N/A	N/A	N/A	N/A		
Valentyn Khodukin	Ukraine	2006	Jun 2009	N/A	N/A	N/A	N/A	N/A	N/A	N/A	Azerbaijan Premier League	
Kakhaber Tskhadadze	Georgia	Jul 2009	Jun 2015	220	111	63	46	301	166	50.45	Azerbaijan Premier League; CIS Cup	
Zaur Svanadze	Georgia	Jun 2015	29 October 2017	94	37	28	29	112	109	39.36		
Ramiz Mammadov	Azerbaijan	29 October 2017	25 December 2017	7	3	0	4	2	10	42.86		
Yuriy Maksymov	Ukraine	25 December 2017	17 July 2018	17	8	6	3	23	15	47.06	Azerbaijan Cup	
Mladen Milinković	Serbia	25 July 2018	29 October 2018	8	1	2	5	7	12	12.50		
Tarlan Ahmadov	Azerbaijan	30 October 2018	8 August 2020	23	6	5	12	15	19	26.09		
Yunis Huseynov	Azerbaijan	16 August 2020	24 January 2021	15	3	5	7	13	21	20.00		
Sanan Gurbanov	Azerbaijan	24 January 2021		0	0	0	0	0	0	—		

- Notes:

P – Total of played matches W – Won matches D – Drawn matches L – Lost matches GS – Goal scored GA – Goals against
%W – Percentage of matches won

Nationality is indicated by the corresponding FIFA country code(s).

== Honours ==
=== National ===
- Azerbaijan League
  - Winners (2): 2007–08, 2009–10
- Azerbaijan Cup
  - Winners (2): 2017–18, 2020–21

=== Regional ===
- CIS Cup
  - Winners (1): 2011
