= Abdulla Abatsiyev =

Azerbaijani-Russian footballer (born 1993)

Personal information
- Full name: Abdulla Alxazoviç Abatsiyev
- Date of birth: 16 August 1993 (age 33)
- Place of birth: Vladikavkaz, Russia
- Height: 1.78 m (5 ft 10 in)
- Position: Midfielder

Youth career
- Yunost Vladikavkaz

Senior career*
Years	Team	Apps	(Gls)
2011–2012	Sumgayit FK	16	(0)
2012	Alania Vladikavkaz 2		
2012–2015	Inter Baku	69	(4)
2016	Torpedo Armavir	7	(0)
2016	FC Spartak Vladikavkaz	8	(0)
2017	FC SKA Rostov-on-Don	18	(3)
2018	FC Mashuk-KMV Pyatigorsk	13	(1)
2019–2020	FC Olimp Khimki	15	(1)

International career
2010	Azerbaijan U17	3	(1)
2010	Azerbaijan U19	5	(0)
2013–2014	Azerbaijan U21	6	(1)
2014	Azerbaijan	1	(0)
- * Club domestic league appearances and goals

Abdulla Alxazoviç Abatsiyev (Russian: Абдулла Алхазович Абациев, 16 August 1993) is an Azerbaijani football coach and a former midfielder. He also holds Russian citizenship.

== Club career ==
Abatsiyev signed with FC Torpedo Armavir on 26 February 2016.

== International career ==
Abatsiyev played his first international game with the national team on 27 May 2014, in a friendly in and against United States where he was named in the starting line-up and played 71 minutes.

On April 16, 2010, he played his first game for the Azerbaijan U19 national team in a European Championship qualifying round match against Norway, which ended in a 1-1 draw. He played the first 63 minutes of the match.
