= Arif Dashdemirov =

Azerbaijani football defender (born 1987)

Personal information
- Full name: Arif Dashdemirov
- Date of birth: 10 February 1987 (age 39)
- Place of birth: Makhachkala, Dagestan ASSR
- Height: 1.70 m (5 ft 7 in)
- Position: Defender

Senior career*
| Years | Team | Apps | (Gls) |
| 2004–2006 | Shahdagh Qusar | 19 | (2) |
| 2006–2007 | → MKT Araz (loan) | 22 | (2) |
| 2007–2008 | Masallı | 20 | (1) |
| 2008 | AZAL | 10 | (0) |
| 2009 | Standard Sumgayit | 16 | (0) |
| 2009–2010 | Gabala | 18 | (0) |
| 2010–2015 | Inter Baku | 139 | (9) |
| 2015–2016 | Gabala | 30 | (1) |
| 2016–2018 | Qarabağ | 15 | (0) |
| 2018–2019 | Sumgayit | 24 | (0) |

International career^{‡}
| 2004 | Azerbaijan U17 | 3 | (0) |
| 2005 | Azerbaijan U19 | 3 | (1) |
| 2006–2007 | Azerbaijan U21 | 7 | (0) |
| 2010– | Azerbaijan | 13 | (0) |
- * Club domestic league appearances and goals as of 31 May 2019 ‡ National team caps and goals as of 12 October 2016

Arif Dashdemirov (Azerbaijani: Arif Daşdəmirov; born 10 February 1987) is an Azerbaijani football defender who has played for the Azerbaijan national team and last played for Sumgayit FK in the Azerbaijan Premier League.

== Career ==
Dashdemirov signed a one-year contract with Gabala in August 2009. Dashdemirov re-signed for Gabala in June 2015. On 25 May 2016, Gabala announced that Dashdemirov had left the club. Following the 2015–16 Cup Final, Qarabağ FK manager Gurban Gurbanov announced that the club had signed Dashdemirov.

On 6 August 2018, Dashdemirov signed for Sumgayit FK.

In all, Dashdemirov has made 14 appearances for the Azerbaijan national team.

== Career statistics ==
=== Club ===
As of match played 11 May 2016

| Season | Club | League | League | | Cup | | Continental | | Total | |
| Season | Club | League | App | Goals | App | Goals | App | Goals | App | Goals |
|---|---|---|---|---|---|---|---|---|---|---|
| 2005–06 | Shahdag Qusar | Azerbaijan Premier League | 19 | 2 | | | - | | | |
| 2006–07 | MKT Araz (loan) | Azerbaijan Premier League | 22 | 2 | | | - | | 22 | 2 |
| 2007–08 | Masallı | Azerbaijan Premier League | 20 | 1 | | | - | | 20 | 1 |
| 2008–09 | Standard Sumgayit | Azerbaijan Premier League | 16 | 0 | | | - | | 16 | 0 |
| 2009–10 | Gabala | Azerbaijan Premier League | 18 | 0 | | | - | | 18 | 0 |
| 2010–11 | Inter Baku | Azerbaijan Premier League | 30 | 1 | 3 | 0 | 2 | 0 | 35 | 1 |
| 2011–12 | Inter Baku | Azerbaijan Premier League | 27 | 1 | 4 | 0 | - | | 31 | 1 |
| 2012–13 | Inter Baku | Azerbaijan Premier League | 25 | 1 | 1 | 0 | 3 | 0 | 29 | 1 |
| 2013–14 | Inter Baku | Azerbaijan Premier League | 28 | 1 | 1 | 0 | 3 | 0 | 32 | 0 |
| 2014–15 | Inter Baku | Azerbaijan Premier League | 29 | 5 | 4 | 2 | 4 | 1 | 37 | 8 |
| 2015–16 | Gabala | Azerbaijan Premier League | 30 | 1 | 2 | 0 | 14 | 0 | 46 | 1 |
| Total | | | 264 | 15 | 15 | 2 | 26 | 1 | 305 | 18 |

=== International ===
Azerbaijan
| Year | Apps | Goals |
|---|---|---|
| 2012 | 1 | 0 |
| 2013 | 0 | 0 |
| 2014 | 0 | 0 |
| 2015 | 8 | 0 |
| Total | 9 | 0 |

Statistics accurate as of match played 17 November 2015

== Honours ==
Qarabağ FK

- Azerbaijan Premier League: (1) 2016–17
