= Bachana Tskhadadze =

Georgian footballer

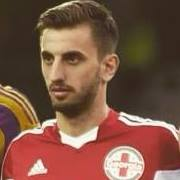

Personal information
- Date of birth: 23 October 1987 (age 39)
- Place of birth: Tbilisi, Georgia
- Height: 1.85 m (6 ft 1 in)
- Position: Forward

Senior career*
Years	Team	Apps	(Gls)
2006–2007	Sioni Bolnisi	23	(4)
2007–2008	WIT Georgia Tbilisi	2	(0)
2008	Ameri Tbilisi	13	(7)
2008–2009	Standard Sumgayit	8	(0)
2009	Gagra	13	(3)
2009–2010	Spartaki Tskhinvali	15	(5)
2010–2015	Inter Baku	117	(47)
2010	→ Simurq (loan)	8	(5)
2015	Flamurtari Vlorë	11	(5)
2016	Locomotive Tbilisi	11	(1)
2016–2017	Samtredia	1	(1)
2017	Chikhura	9	(0)
2018	Bastia	1	(0)

International career
2014–2018	Georgia	5	(0)
- * Club domestic league appearances and goals

Bachana Tskhadadze (Georgian: ბაჩანა ცხადაძე; born 23 October 1987) is a Georgian former footballer who played as a forward. He works as a football manager.

== Club career ==
=== Inter Baku ===
Tskhadadze signed for Inter Baku in May 2010, where he spent 5 seasons and managed to score 47 goals which is the club's all-time record until present.

=== Flamurtari Vlorë ===
On 10 August 2015, Tskhadadze signed a one-year deal with Albanian Superliga side Flamurtari Vlorë with an option to extend for another year. He was presented to the media the very same day, and was given number 28 for the upcoming 2015–16 season.

=== Bastia ===
Tskhadadze joined Corsican club Bastia in the summer of 2018 just a year from recovery of an Achilles tendon surgery. He announced his retirement in January 2019 because of the multiple injuries he was suffering.

== International career ==
Tskhadadze debuted for Georgia's national team in a friendly match against Liechtenstein on 5 March 2014.

== Post-playing career ==
After retiring from professional football as a player, Bachana Tskhadadze founded an international sports agency; Football Business Consulting, where he was the CEO from 2019 to 2022.

In February 2022, Tskhadadze was appointed as the sports director of FC RUSTAVI and from April 2022 until present he is the General director of FC RUSTAVI.

== Personal life ==
Bachana Tskhadadze is the son of former Georgian international football player and current football coach Kakhaber Tskhadadze.

== Career statistics ==
=== Club ===
As of 15 January 2016

Appearances and goals by club, season and competition
Club	Season	League			National cup		Continental		Other		Total	
Club	Season	Division	Apps	Goals	Apps	Goals	Apps	Goals	Apps	Goals	Apps	Goals
Sioni Bolnisi	2006–07	Umaglesi Liga	19	1	3	1	0	0	—		22	2
WIT Georgia	2007–08	Umaglesi Liga	2	0	0	0	—		—		2	0
Ameri Tbilisi	2007–08	Umaglesi Liga	3	0	6	4	—		—		9	4
Standard Sumgayit	2008–09	Azerbaijan Premier League	5	0	0	0	—		—		5	0
Gagra	2008–09	Umaglesi Liga	9	2	2	0	—		—		11	2
Spartaki Tskhinvali	2009–10	Umaglesi Liga	15	3	0	0	—		—		15	3
Inter Baku	2010–11	Azerbaijan Premier League	1	0	1	0	—		—		2	0
Inter Baku	2011–12	Azerbaijan Premier League	29	8	3	1	—		—		32	9
Inter Baku	2012–13	Azerbaijan Premier League	29	7	3	2	3	2	—		35	11
Inter Baku	2013–14	Azerbaijan Premier League	29	14	2	0	4	2	—		35	16
Inter Baku	2014–15	Azerbaijan Premier League	28	7	5	2	4	2	—		37	11
Inter Baku	Total		116	36	20	10	11	6	0	0	147	47
Simurq (loan)	2010–11	Azerbaijan Premier League	8	5	0	0	—		—		8	5
Flamurtari Vlorë	2014–15	Albanian Superliga	11	4	2	1	—		—		13	5
Career total			192	51	21	11	11	6	0	0	224	68

=== International ===
As of 15 January 2016

Georgia
Year	Apps	Goals
2014	2	0
2014	3	0
Total	5	0

== Honours ==
Ameri Tbilisi

- Georgian Super Cup: 2007

Inter Baku

- Commonwealth of Independent States Cup: 2011

Samtredia

- Erovnuli Liga: 2016

Chikhura Sachkhere

- Georgian Cup: 2017
