= Mikel Álvaro =

Spanish footballer

Personal information
- Full name: Mikel Álvaro Salazar
- Date of birth: 20 December 1982 (age 43)
- Place of birth: Amurrio, Spain
- Height: 1.76 m (5 ft 9 1/2 in)
- Position: Winger

Senior career*
Years	Team	Apps	(Gls)
2001–2002	Aurrerá		
2002–2003	Indautxu		
2003–2006	Amurrio	67	(5)
2006–2007	Barakaldo	30	(2)
2007–2008	Dénia	35	(1)
2008–2009	Lleida	36	(13)
2009–2011	Numancia	50	(4)
2011–2013	Dinamo Tbilisi	59	(21)
2013–2015	Inter Baku	49	(13)
2015–2016	Auckland City	5	(2)
2016	Dinamo Tbilisi	10	(0)
2017–2022	Amorebieta	129	(7)
2022–2023	Portugalete	6	(1)
2023	Laredo	13	(1)
Total		489	(70)
- * Club domestic league appearances and goals

Mikel Álvaro Salazar (born 20 December 1982) is a Spanish former professional footballer who played as a right winger.

== Club career ==
Álvaro was born in Amurrio, Álava. After spending most of his career in the Segunda División B or lower, mainly with hometown's Amurrio Club, he arrived at already 27 at CD Numancia of Segunda División. His first game in the competition occurred on 29 August 2009, as he played one minute in a 2–1 away win against RC Celta de Vigo. Already as a starter, he scored his first goal as a professional, in a 1–0 home victory over Real Unión.

In early August 2011, Álvaro terminated his contract with the Soria club, going on to spend the following two seasons in Georgia with FC Dinamo Tbilisi, where he shared teams with several compatriots. In the summer of 2013, he joined Azerbaijan Premier League side Inter Baku PIK on a two-year deal.

Álvaro left Auckland City FC in January 2016, and rejoined Dinamo Tbilisi later that month. He returned to both his homeland and his native region on 16 January 2017, signing for third-tier SD Amorebieta and helping to a first-ever promotion to the professional leagues at the end of the 2020–21 campaign.

Álvaro retired in June 2023 aged 40, following short spells in the lower leagues with Club Portugalete and CD Laredo.

== Career statistics ==
As of match played 25 August 2016

Club	Season	League			National Cup		Continental		Total	
Club	Season	Division	Apps	Goals	Apps	Goals	Apps	Goals	Apps	Goals
Barakaldo	2006–07	Segunda División B	30	2			–		30	2
Dénia	2007–08	Segunda División B	35	1			–		35	1
Lleida	2008–09	Segunda División B	36	13			–		36	13
Numancia	2009–10	Segunda División	34	4			-		34	4
Numancia	2010–11	Segunda División	16	0			-		16	0
Numancia	Total		50	4	0	0	-	-	50	4
Dinamo Tbilisi	2011–12	Erovnuli Liga	29	7	1	0	2	0	32	7
Dinamo Tbilisi	2012–13	Erovnuli Liga	30	14	8	4	0	0	38	18
Dinamo Tbilisi	Total		59	21	9	4	2	0	70	25
Inter Baku	2013–14	Azerbaijan Premier League	20	4	2	0	4	0	26	4
Inter Baku	2014–15	Azerbaijan Premier League	29	9	3	1	4	0	36	10
Inter Baku	Total		49	13	5	1	8	0	62	14
Auckland City	2015–16	Football Championship	5	2	0	0	1	0	6	2
Auckland City	Total		5	2	0	0	1	0	6	2
Dinamo Tbilisi	2015–16	Erovnuli Liga	7	0	3	0	0	0	10	0
Dinamo Tbilisi	2016	Erovnuli Liga	3	0	0	0	3	0	6	0
Dinamo Tbilisi	Total		10	0	3	0	3	0	16	0
Career total			274	56	17	5	14	0	305	61

== Honours ==
Dinamo Tbilisi

- Erovnuli Liga: 2012–13, 2015–16
- Georgian Cup: 2012–13, 2015–16
