= 2013–14 FC Inter Baku season =

Inter Baku
2013–14 season
- President: Jahangir Hajiyev
- Manager: Kakhaber Tskhadadze
- Stadium: Shafa Stadium
- Premier League: 2nd
- Azerbaijan Cup: Quarterfinals vs Neftchi Baku
- Europa League: 2nd Qualifying round vs Tromsø
- Top goalscorer: League: Vagif Javadov (14); All: Vagif Javadov (16)
- Highest home attendance: 2,300 vs Mariehamn; 4 July 2013
- Lowest home attendance: 200 vs AZAL; 1 February 2014
- Average home league attendance: 1,123
Home colours	Away colours

The Inter Baku 2013–14 season was Inter Baku's thirteenth Azerbaijan Premier League season, and their fifth season under manager Kakhaber Tskhadadze. They started the season competing in the 2013–14 UEFA Europa League, defeating Mariehamn before losing to Tromsø in the second qualifying round. They reached the Quarterfinals of the Azerbaijan Cup, losing to Neftchi Baku, and finished 2nd in the League.

== Squad ==
As of 6 February 2014

Note: Flags indicate national team as defined under FIFA eligibility rules; some limited exceptions apply. Players may hold more than one non-FIFA nationality.

No.	Pos.	Nation	Player
1	GK	GEO	Giorgi Lomaia (captain)
2	DF	AZE	Azer Salahli
3	DF	GEO	Lasha Salukvadze
4	DF	ESP	Iván Benítez
5	MF	MKD	Slavčo Georgievski
6	MF	AZE	Samir Zargarov
7	DF	AZE	Ruslan Amirjanov
8	MF	ESP	Mikel Álvaro
9	FW	GEO	Alexander Iashvili
11	MF	AZE	Asif Mammadov
12	MF	CZE	Ivo Táborský (loan from Teplice)
13	MF	AZE	Mirsahib Abbasov
14	DF	AZE	Ilgar Alakbarov
15	DF	FRA	Yohan Bocognano
19	MF	PAR	César Meza
20	DF	CGO	Bruce Abdoulaye

No.	Pos.	Nation	Player
21	MF	AZE	Arif Dashdemirov
24	MF	AZE	Fuad Bayramov
25	GK	AZE	Salahat Aghayev
27	MF	CRC	Diego Madrigal
28	FW	GEO	Bachana Tskhadadze
30	DF	AZE	Abbas Hüseynov
33	DF	CRO	Matija Špičić
47	MF	AZE	Abdulla Abatsiyev
64	DF	AZE	Elhad Naziri
70	FW	AZE	Vagif Javadov
77	MF	BRA	Flavio
87	DF	AZE	Jamal Hajiyev
88	MF	PAR	David Meza
91	MF	AZE	Joshgun Diniyev
96	GK	AZE	Elshan Poladov

== Transfers ==
=== Summer ===
In: Note: Flags indicate national team as defined under FIFA eligibility rules; some limited exceptions apply. Players may hold more than one non-FIFA nationality.

No.	Pos.	Nation	Player
3	DF	GEO	Lasha Salukvadze (from (Russia) SKA-Energiya Khabarovsk)
4	DF	ESP	Iván Benítez (from (Cyprus) Nea Salamis)
8	MF	ESP	Mikel Álvaro (from (Georgia (country)) Dinamo Tbilisi)
9	FW	GEO	Alexander Iashvili (from (Germany) VfL Bochum)
19	MF	PAR	César Meza (from (Italy) Cesena)
22	FW	MKD	Ilčo Naumoski (from (Austria) Mattersburg)
25	GK	AZE	Salahat Aghayev (loan return from (Azerbaijan) Sumgayit)
33	DF	CRO	Matija Špičić (from (Russia) Sibir Novosibirsk)
44	DF	BRA	João Paulo (from (Brazil) Bragantino)
64	DF	AZE	Elhad Naziri (from (Azerbaijan) Ravan Baku)
70	FW	AZE	Vagif Javadov (from (Azerbaijan) Qarabağ)
77	FW	BRA	Flavio Beck (from (Montenegro) Budućnost Podgorica)
88	MF	PAR	David Meza (from (Italy) Cesena)
—	DF	AZE	Rustam Abasov (loan return from (Azerbaijan) Simurq)

Out: Note: Flags indicate national team as defined under FIFA eligibility rules; some limited exceptions apply. Players may hold more than one non-FIFA nationality.

No.	Pos.	Nation	Player
4	DF	GEO	Valeri Abramidze (to (Georgia (country)) Sioni Bolnisi)
8	MF	AZE	Nizami Hajiyev (to (Azerbaijan) Gabala)
10	FW	GEO	Georgi Adamia (to (Georgia (country)) Zestafoni)
14	MF	BUL	Petar Zlatinov (to (Bulgaria) Litex Lovech)
15	DF	AZE	Volodimir Levin (to (Azerbaijan) Gabala)
18	DF	GEO	Ilia Kandelaki (to (Georgia (country)) Zestafoni)
23	FW	POL	Tales Schütz (to Hong Kong Rangers)
25	MF	SEN	Ibrahima Niasse (to (Azerbaijan) Gabala)
29	DF	AZE	Ruslan Cafarov (to (Azerbaijan) Khazar Lankaran)
30	FW	UKR	Yuriy Fomenko (to (Azerbaijan) AZAL)
74	GK	GEO	Revaz Tevdoradze (to (Georgia (country)) Chikhura Sachkhere)
91	FW	BRA	Leonardo Rocha (to (Brazil) Olaria)
—	DF	AZE	Rustam Abasov
—	GK	AZE	Asif Mirili

=== Winter ===
In: Note: Flags indicate national team as defined under FIFA eligibility rules; some limited exceptions apply. Players may hold more than one non-FIFA nationality.

No.	Pos.	Nation	Player
12	MF	CZE	Ivo Táborský (loan from (Czech Republic) Teplice)
15	DF	FRA	Yohan Bocognano (from (France) Istres)
27	MF	CRC	Diego Madrigal (from (Costa Rica) Saprissa)

Out: Note: Flags indicate national team as defined under FIFA eligibility rules; some limited exceptions apply. Players may hold more than one non-FIFA nationality.

No.	Pos.	Nation	Player
10	MF	BUL	Daniel Genov (to (Bulgaria) Lokomotiv Sofia)
17	FW	AZE	Ramil Mansurov (to (Azerbaijan) Sumgayit)
22	FW	MKD	Ilčo Naumoski (to (North Macedonia) Vardar)
44	DF	BRA	João Paulo (to (Brazil) Atlético Sorocaba)

== Competitions ==
=== Friendlies ===
	Inter Baku (Azerbaijan)	8 – 0	(Austria) Wacker Innsbruck	Austria
AZST (UTC+5)	Goal	Summary

22 June 2013	Inter Baku (Azerbaijan)	0 – 0	(Russia) Krasnodar	Austria
AZST (UTC+5)		Summary

24 June 2013	Inter Baku (Azerbaijan)	1 – 1	(Czech Republic) Slavia Prague	Austria
18:30 AZST (UTC+5)	Amirjanov 15'	Summary	Škoda 88'

27 June 2013	Inter Baku (Azerbaijan)	0 – 1	(Russia) Anzhi Makhachkala	Austria
AZST (UTC+5)		Video; Summary	Ionov 61'

11 January 2014	Inter Baku (Azerbaijan)	8 – 0	(Netherlands) NWC Asten	Antalya, Turkey
AZT (UTC+4)	Tskhadadze; Špičić; Álvaro; I.Alakbarov; N.Mənsimzadə	Summary

16 January 2014	Inter Baku (Azerbaijan)	0 – 3	(Germany) Holstein Kiel	Antalya, Turkey
AZT (UTC+4)		[ Summary]	Goal

18 January 2014	Inter Baku (Azerbaijan)	1 – 1	(Kazakhstan) Aktobe	Antalya, Turkey
AZT (UTC+4)	Iashvili 41'	Summary

22 January 2014	Inter Baku (Azerbaijan)	2 – 0	(Germany) Zeitz	Antalya, Turkey
AZT (UTC+4)	Tskhadadze 4'; C. Meza 40'	Summary

24 January 2014	Inter Baku (Azerbaijan)	3 – 1	(Brazil) União	Antalya, Turkey
20:00 AZT (UTC+4)		Summary

January 2014	Inter Baku (Azerbaijan)	2 – 2	(Germany) Arminia Bielefeld	Antalya, Turkey
		[ Summary]

=== Azerbaijan Premier League ===
==== Results summary ====
Overall								Home						Away					
Pld	W	D	L	GF	GA	GD	Pts	W	D	L	GF	GA	GD	W	D	L	GF	GA	GD
35	19	7	9	60	37	+23	64	8	5	5	26	18	+8	11	2	4	34	19	+15

Last updated: 19 May 2014.
Source: Soccerway

==== Results by round ====
Round	1	2	3	4	5	6	7	8	9	10	11	12	13	14	15	16	17	18	19	20	21	22	23	24	25	26	27	28	29	30	31	32	33	34	35	36
Ground	H	A	H	A	H	A	H	A	A	H	A	H	H	H	A	H	H	A	H	A	A	A	H	A	H	H	A	H	A	H	A	H	H	A	H	A
Result	L	L	L	W	L	L	D	W	W	L	W	W	D	W	W	D	W	L	W	W	W	D	D	D	W	L	W	W	W	W	W	W	W	L	D	W
Position	8	8	9	8	8	10	9	8	7	8	7	5	5	5	4	5	5	5	5	5	5	5	5	5	4	4	4	4	3	2	2	2	2	2	2	2

Source: Soccerway
A = Away; H = Home; W = Win; D = Draw; L = Loss

==== Results ====
4 August 2013 1	Inter Baku	1 – 2	Qarabağ	Baku
20:00 AZST (UTC+5)	Javadov 7'	Summary	Chumbinho 36'; George 57'	Stadium: Shafa Stadium; Attendance: 350; Referee: Rahim Häsänov

10 August 2013 2	Gabala	3 – 2	Inter Baku	Qabala
18:00 AZST (UTC+5)	Leonardo 54' (pen.); Levin 69'; Niasse 83'	Summary	Georgievski 20'; Javadov 90+1'	Stadium: Gabala City Stadium; Attendance: 1,100; Referee: Aliyar Ağayev

18 August 2013 3	Inter Baku	1 – 2	AZAL	Baku
20:00 AZST (UTC+5)	Amirjanov 30'	Summary	Igbekoi 42', 67'	Stadium: Shafa Stadium; Attendance: 300; Referee: Rauf Jabbarov

25 August 2013 4	Ravan Baku	1 – 5	Inter Baku	Baku
20:00 AZST (UTC+5)	Castro-Tello 12'	Summary	Abdoulaye 17'; Tskhadadze 30', 36', 42'; Mammadov 88'	Stadium: Bayil Stadium; Attendance: 250; Referee: Elvin Äsgärov

1 September 2013 5	Inter Baku	1 – 2	Simurq	Baku
20:00 AZST (UTC+5)	I.Alakbarov 31'	Summary	Ćeran 78'; Costin 89'	Stadium: Shafa Stadium; Attendance: 600; Referee: Aliyar Ağayev

12 September 2013 6	Neftchi Baku	3 – 1	Inter Baku	Baku
19:00 AZST (UTC+5)	Abdullayev 14'; Cardoso 21'; Platje 45+1'; Bertucci (yellow card) 35' (yellow-red card) 83'	Summary	Javadov 67'; A.Abatsiyev (yellow card) 54' (yellow-red card) 83'	Stadium: Bakcell Arena; Attendance: 1,500; Referee: Vusal Äliyev

21 September 2013 7	Inter Baku	2 – 2	Baku	Baku
17:00 AZST (UTC+5)	Iashvili 30'; Špičić 86'	Summary	Ismayilov 7', 45+1' (pen.)	Stadium: Shafa Stadium; Attendance: 600; Referee: Fariz Yusifov

27 September 2013 8	Khazar Lankaran	0 – 1	Inter Baku	Lankaran
19:00 AZST (UTC+5)		Summary	Špičić 10'	Stadium: Lankaran City Stadium; Attendance: 6,500; Referee: Orkhan Mämmädov

4 October 2013 9	Sumgayit	0 – 2	Inter Baku	Sumqayit
16:00 AZST (UTC+5)	R.Gurbanov (yellow card) 28' (yellow-red card) 66'	Summary	Ibragimov 14' (o.g.); Javadov 31'	Stadium: Mehdi Huseynzade Stadium; Attendance: 300; Referee: Rahim Häsänov

19 October 2013 10	Inter Baku	0 – 1	Gabala	Baku
19:00 AZST (UTC+5)		Summary	Subotić 45+2'	Stadium: Shafa Stadium; Attendance: 3,000; Referee: Aliyar Ağayev

26 October 2013 11	AZAL	0 – 2	Inter Baku	Baku
17:00 AZST (UTC+5)		Summary	Tskhadadze 67'; Mammadov 82'	Stadium: AZAL Arena; Attendance: 200; Referee: Orkhan Mämmädov

2 November 2013 12	Inter Baku	3 – 2	Ravan Baku	Baku
17:00 AZST (UTC+5)	Tskhadadze 5'; Javadov 11'; Abdoulaye 82'	Summary	Abbasov 15'; Adamović 90'	Stadium: Shafa Stadium; Attendance: 500; Referee: Vusal Äliyev

9 November 2013 13	Inter Baku	0 – 0	Simurq	Baku
18:00 AZST (UTC+5)		Summary		Stadium: Shafa Stadium; Attendance: 700; Referee: Orkhan Mämmädov

23 November 2013 14	Inter Baku	3 – 1	Neftchi Baku	Baku
15:00 AZT (UTC+4)	Javadov 33', 77'; Iashvili 81'	Summary	Flavinho (red card) 63'; Cardoso 65'	Stadium: Shafa Stadium; Attendance: 1,000; Referee: Rahim Häsänov

30 November 2013 15	Baku	0 – 1	Inter Baku	Baku
14:00 AZT (UTC+4)		Summary	Javadov 59'	Stadium: Tofik Bakhramov Stadium; Attendance: 500; Referee: Orkhan Mämmädov

8 December 2013 16	Inter Baku	0 – 0	Khazar Lankaran	Baku
17:00 AZT (UTC+4)		Summary		Stadium: Shafa Stadium; Attendance: 3,500; Referee: Aliyar Ağayev

14 December 2013 17	Inter Baku	2 – 0	Sumgayit	Baku
17:00 AZT (UTC+4)	A.Abatsiyev 32'; Javadov 88'	Summary		Stadium: Shafa Stadium; Attendance: 250; Referee: Orkhan Mämmädov

20 December 2013 18	Qarabağ	2 – 0	Inter Baku	Baku
17:00 AZT (UTC+4)	Nadirov 58'; Richard 65'	Summary		Stadium: Tofiq Bahramov Stadium^{1} Attendance: 500; Referee: Aliyar Ağayev

1 February 2014 19	Inter Baku	2 – 1	AZAL	Baku
17:00 AZT (UTC+4)	A.Abatsiyev 6'; Amirjanov 78'	Summary	N.Turković 49'	Stadium: Shafa Stadium; Attendance: 200; Referee: Fariz Yusifov

8 February 2014 20	Ravan Baku	1 – 2	Inter Baku	Baku
15:00 AZT (UTC+4)	Huseyn Akhundov (yellow card) 19' (yellow-red card) 44'; Akpoveta 56'	Summary	Iashvili 17'; Javadov 90+4'	Stadium: Bayil Stadium; Attendance: 500; Referee: Rauf Jabbarov

14 February 2014 21	Simurq	0 – 1	Inter Baku	Zaqatala
15:00 AZT (UTC+4)		Summary	Madrigal 72'	Stadium: Zaqatala City Stadium; Attendance: 1,500; Referee: Omar Paşayev

19 February 2014 22	Neftchi Baku	2 – 2	Inter Baku	Baku
16:00 AZT (UTC+4)	Abdullayev 76' (pen.); R.Gurbanov 86'	Summary	Bocognano 29'; Salukvadze 81'	Stadium: Bakcell Arena; Attendance: 500; Referee: Fariz Yusifov

23 February 2014 23	Inter Baku	1 – 1	Baku	Baku
16:00 AZT (UTC+4)	Javadov 27'	Summary	Šolić 12'	Stadium: Shafa Stadium; Attendance: 500; Referee: Rahim Häsänov

28 February 2014 24	Khazar Lankaran	1 – 1	Inter Baku	Lankaran
16:00 AZT (UTC+4)	Thiego 42'	Summary	Tskhadadze 32' (pen.)	Stadium: Lankaran City Stadium; Attendance: 2,000; Referee: Elvin Äsgärov

8 March 2014 25	Sumgayit	0 – 1	Inter Baku	Sumgayit
14:00 AZT (UTC+4)		Summary	Javadov 63'	Stadium: Mehdi Huseynzade Stadium; Attendance: 2,500; Referee: Rahim Häsänov

16 March 2014 26	Inter Baku	0 – 3	Qarabağ	Baku
17:00 AZT (UTC+4)		Summary	George 38'; Nadirov 60'; Medvedev 89'	Stadium: Shafa Stadium; Attendance: 2,000; Referee: Fariz Yusifov

23 March 2014 27	Gabala	1 – 4	Inter Baku	Qabala
15:00 AZT (UTC+4)	Mendy 89'	Summary	Tskhadadze 14'; Álvaro 46', 54'; Špičić 57'	Stadium: Gabala City Stadium; Attendance: 2,000; Referee: Rauf Jabbarov

31 March 2014 28	Inter Baku	3 – 0	Ravan Baku	Baku
17:00 AZT (UTC+4)	Tskhadadze 24'; Iashvili 66'; Álvaro 90+3'	Summary		Stadium: Shafa Stadium; Attendance: 700; Referee: Ellvin Äsgärov

6 April 2014 29	Simurq	0 – 1	Inter Baku	Zaqatala
16:00 AZST (UTC+5)		Summary	Tskhadadze 74'	Stadium: Zaqatala City Stadium; Attendance: 200; Referee: Vusal Äliyev

11 April 2014 30	Inter Baku	2 – 1	Neftchi Baku	Baku
17:00 AZST (UTC+5)	Špičić 48', 66'	Summary	Yunuszade 61'	Stadium: Shafa Stadium; Attendance: 2,200; Referee: Orkhan Mämmädov

20 April 2014 31	Baku	0 – 4	Inter Baku	Baku
15:00 AZST (UTC+5)	Etto (yellow card) 72' (yellow-red card) 72'	Summary	D.Meza 11'; Etto 50' (o.g.); Álvaro 80'; Javadov 88'	Stadium: Tofik Bakhramov Stadium; Attendance: 1,000; Referee: Rahim Häsänov

27 April 2014 32	Inter Baku	3 – 0	Khazar Lankaran	Baku
19:00 AZST (UTC+5)	Dashdemirov 5'; A.Abatsiyev 75'; D.Meza 84'	Summary		Stadium: Shafa Stadium; Attendance: 2,200; Referee: Aliyar Ağayev

2 May 2014 33	Inter Baku	2 – 0	Sumgayit	Baku
17:00 AZST (UTC+5)	Iashvili 51'; Javadov 90+2'	Summary		Stadium: Shafa Stadium; Attendance: 350; Referee: Rauf Jabbarov

7 May 2014 34	Qarabağ	4 – 1	Inter Baku	Baku
19:00 AZST (UTC+5)	Reynaldo 12', 70', 85'; Muarem 86'	Summary	Tskhadadze 74'	Stadium: Tofiq Bahramov Stadium^{1} Attendance: 4,000; Referee: Orkhan Mämmädov

12 May 2014 35	Inter Baku	0 – 0	Gabala	Baku
18:00 AZST (UTC+5)		Summary		Stadium: Shafa Stadium; Attendance: 1,000; Referee: Fariz Yusifov

17 May 2014 36	AZAL	1 – 3	Inter Baku	Baku
17:00 AZST (UTC+5)	A.Qasımov 75'	Summary	S.Zargarov 2'; Madrigal 9', 84'	Stadium: AZAL Arena; Attendance: 400; Referee: Rauf Jabbarov

==== League table ====
Pos	Team	Pld	W	D	L	GF	GA	GD	Pts	Qualification or relegation
1	Qarabağ (C)	36	21	9	6	65	21	+44	72	Qualification for Champions League second qualifying round
2	Inter Baku	36	20	7	9	60	37	+23	67	Qualification for Europa League first qualifying round
3	Gabala	36	18	7	11	48	36	+12	61	Qualification for Europa League first qualifying round
4	Neftçi Baku	36	17	9	10	47	43	+4	60	Qualification for Europa League second qualifying round
5	Baku	36	16	9	11	53	43	+10	57	

Source: Azerbaijan Professional Football league
Rules for classification: 1) points; 2) goal difference; 3) number of goals scored.
(C) Champions

=== Azerbaijan Cup ===
4 December 2013 Second Round	Inter Baku	7 – 0	Shusha	Baku
AZT (UTC+4)	Iashvili 27', 33', 62'; Amirjanov 36'; Mammadov 45', 57'; Abatsiyev 90+1'	Summary	Garayev (red card) 84'	Stadium: Shafa Stadium; Attendance: 400; Referee: Anar Salmanov

12 March 2014 Quarterfinals 1st leg	Inter Baku	1 – 1	Neftchi Baku	Baku
15:00 AZT (UTC+4)	Javadov 83'	Summary	Nasimov 51'	Stadium: Shafa Stadium; Attendance: 2,000; Referee: Äliyar Ağayev

19 March 2014 Quarterfinals 2nd leg	Neftchi Baku	0 – 0 (a1 – 1 agg.)	Inter Baku	Baku
19:00 AZT (UTC+4)		Summary		Stadium: Bakcell Arena; Attendance: 1,200; Referee: Aliyar Ağayev

=== UEFA Europa League ===
==== Qualifying phase ====
4 July 2013 1st qualifying round 1st leg	Inter Baku (Azerbaijan)	1 – 1	(Finland) Mariehamn	Baku, Azerbaijan
21:00 AZST (UTC+5)	Mammadov 7'	Summary	P.Jokihaara 72'	Stadium: Bayil Stadium^{1} Attendance: 2,300; Referee: Sergejus Slyva (Lithuania)

11 July 2013 1st qualifying round 2nd leg	Mariehamn (Finland)	0 – 2 (1 – 3 agg.)	(Azerbaijan) Inter Baku	Mariehamn, Finland
22:00 AZST (UTC+5)		Report	Tskhadadze 21' (pen.); Javadov 86'	Stadium: Wiklöf Holding Arena; Attendance: 1,532; Referee: Mervyn Smyth (Northern Ireland)

18 July 2013 2nd qualifying round 1st leg	Tromsø (Norway)	2 – 0	(Azerbaijan) Inter Baku	Tromsø, Norway
22:00 AZST (UTC+5)	Ondrášek 43'; Andersen 62'	Report		Stadium: Alfheim Stadion; Attendance: 1,998; Referee: Yuriy Mozharovsky (Ukraine)

25 July 2013 2nd qualifying round 2nd leg	Inter Baku (Azerbaijan)	1 – 0 (1 – 2 agg.)	(Norway) Tromsø	Baku, Azerbaijan
21:00 AZST (UTC+5)	Tskhadadze 76'	Report		Stadium: Bayil Stadium^{1} Attendance: 2,100; Referee: Eli Hacmon (Israel)

== Squad statistics ==
As of Match played 17 May 2014

=== Appearances and goals ===
No.	Pos	Nat	Player	Total		Premier League		Azerbaijan Cup		Europa League	
No.	Pos	Nat	Player	Apps	Goals	Apps	Goals	Apps	Goals	Apps	Goals
1	GK	(Georgia (country)) GEO	Giorgi Lomaia	14	0	9+1	0	0+0	0	4+0	0
2	DF	(Azerbaijan) AZE	Azer Salahli	1	0	0+1	0	0+0	0	0+0	0
3	DF	(Georgia (country)) GEO	Lasha Salukvadze	30	1	26+0	1	3+0	0	1+0	0
4	DF	(Spain) ESP	Iván Benítez	27	0	23+0	0	1+0	0	3+0	0
5	MF	(North Macedonia) MKD	Slavčo Georgievski	26	1	15+6	1	1+0	0	4+0	0
6	MF	(Azerbaijan) AZE	Samir Zargarov	6	1	1+3	1	0+0	0	0+2	0
7	DF	(Azerbaijan) AZE	Ruslan Amirjanov	32	2	21+4	2	3+0	0	4+0	0
8	MF	(Spain) ESP	Mikel Álvaro	26	4	10+10	4	1+1	0	3+1	0
9	FW	(Georgia (country)) GEO	Alexander Iashvili	40	7	27+6	5	2+1	2	4+0	0
11	MF	(Azerbaijan) AZE	Asif Mammadov	28	5	8+16	2	1+1	2	2+0	1
12	MF	(Czech Republic) CZE	Ivo Táborský	6	0	0+6	0	0+0	0	0+0	0
13	MF	(Azerbaijan) AZE	Mirsahib Abbasov	1	0	0+0	0	0+1	0	0+0	0
14	DF	(Azerbaijan) AZE	Ilgar Alakbarov	15	1	9+5	1	0+0	0	0+1	0
15	DF	(France) FRA	Yohan Bocognano	16	1	13+1	1	2+0	0	0+0	0
18	MF	(Paraguay) PAR	César Meza	18	0	7+8	0	1+2	0	0+0	0
20	DF	(Republic of the Congo) CGO	Bruce Abdoulaye	38	2	31+0	2	3+0	0	4+0	0
21	MF	(Azerbaijan) AZE	Arif Dashdemirov	32	1	23+5	1	1+0	0	3+0	0
24	MF	(Azerbaijan) AZE	Fuad Bayramov	5	0	1+4	0	0+0	0	0+0	0
25	GK	(Azerbaijan) AZE	Salahat Aghayev	28	0	25+0	0	3+0	0	0+0	0
27	MF	(Costa Rica) CRC	Diego Madrigal	6	3	1+5	3	0+0	0	0+0	0
28	FW	(Georgia (country)) GEO	Bachana Tskhadadze	35	12	26+3	10	1+1	0	3+1	2
30	DF	(Azerbaijan) AZE	Abbas Hüseynov	2	0	1+1	0	0+0	0	0+0	0
33	MF	(Croatia) CRO	Matija Špičić	34	6	25+4	5	2+1	1	1+1	0
35	FW	(Azerbaijan) AZE	İlkin Sadıqov	1	0	0+1	0	0+0	0	0+0	0
47	MF	(Azerbaijan) AZE	Abdulla Abatsiyev	31	4	23+2	3	3+0	1	3+0	0
70	FW	(Azerbaijan) AZE	Vagif Javadov	40	16	32+1	14	3+0	1	4+0	1
77	MF	(Brazil) BRA	Flavio Beck	5	0	2+2	0	0+0	0	1+0	0
88	MF	(Paraguay) PAR	David Meza	29	2	25+1	2	2+1	0	0+0	0
91	MF	(Azerbaijan) AZE	Joshgun Diniyev	7	0	5+2	0	0+0	0	0+0	0
96	GK	(Azerbaijan) AZE	Elshan Poladov	2	0	2+0	0	0+0	0	0+0	0
Players who appeared for Inter Baku no longer at the club:
10	MF	(Bulgaria) BUL	Daniel Genov	6	0	1+1	0	0+0	0	0+4	0
17	FW	(Azerbaijan) AZE	Ramil Mansurov	2	0	0+1	0	0+0	0	0+1	0
22	FW	(North Macedonia) MKD	Ilčo Naumoski	4	0	1+3	0	0+0	0	0+0	0
44	DF	(Brazil) BRA	João Paulo	5	0	3+2	0	0+0	0	0+0	0

=== Goal scorers ===
Place	Position	Nation	Number	Name	Premier League	Azerbaijan Cup	Europa League	Total
1	FW	(Azerbaijan)	70	Vagif Javadov	14	1	1	16
2	FW	(Georgia (country))	28	Bachana Tskhadadze	10	0	2	12
3	FW	(Georgia (country))	9	Alexander Iashvili	5	2	0	7
4	FW	(Azerbaijan)	11	Asif Mammadov	2	2	1	5
5	DF	(Croatia)	33	Matija Špičić	5	1	0	6
6	MF	(Spain)	8	Mikel Álvaro	4	0	0	4
6	MF	(Azerbaijan)	47	Abdulla Abatsiyev	3	1	0	4
8	MF	(Costa Rica)	27	Diego Madrigal	3	0	0	3
8	MF	(Azerbaijan)	7	Ruslan Amirjanov	2	1	0	3
10	DF	(Republic of the Congo)	20	Bruce Abdoulaye	2	0	0	2
10	MF	(Paraguay)	88	David Meza	2	0	0	2
10				Own goal	2	0	0	2
13	MF	(North Macedonia)	5	Slavčo Georgievski	1	0	0	1
13	DF	(Azerbaijan)	14	Ilgar Alakbarov	1	0	0	1
13	DF	(France)	15	Yohan Bocognano	1	0	0	1
13	DF	(Georgia (country))	3	Lasha Salukvadze	1	0	0	1
13	MF	(Azerbaijan)	21	Arif Dashdemirov	1	0	0	1
13	MF	(Azerbaijan)	6	Samir Zargarov	1	0	0	1
				TOTALS	60	8	4	72

=== Disciplinary record ===
Number	Nation	Position	Name	Premier League		Azerbaijan Cup		Europa League		Total	
Number	Nation	Position	Name	Yellow card	Red card	Yellow card	Red card	Yellow card	Red card	Yellow card	Red card
1	(Georgia (country))	GK	Giorgi Lomaia	2	0	0	0	0	0	2	0
3	(Georgia (country))	DF	Lasha Salukvadze	1	0	1	0	0	0	2	0
4	(Spain)	DF	Iván Benítez	3	0	0	0	1	0	4	0
5	(North Macedonia)	MF	Slavčo Georgievski	1	0	0	0	1	0	2	0
6	(Azerbaijan)	MF	Samir Zargarov	1	0	0	0	0	0	1	0
7	(Azerbaijan)	MF	Ruslan Amirjanov	4	0	0	0	0	0	4	0
8	(Spain)	MF	Mikel Álvaro	4	0	0	0	0	0	4	0
9	(Georgia (country))	FW	Alexander Iashvili	3	0	0	0	1	0	4	0
11	(Azerbaijan)	MF	Asif Mammadov	1	0	0	0	0	0	1	0
14	(Azerbaijan)	DF	Ilgar Alakbarov	1	0	0	0	0	0	1	0
15	(France)	DF	Yohan Bocognano	5	0	0	0	0	0	5	0
18	(Paraguay)	MF	César Meza	2	0	1	0	0	0	3	0
20	(Republic of the Congo)	DF	Bruce Abdoulaye	12	0	2	0	1	0	15	0
21	(Azerbaijan)	MF	Arif Dashdemirov	4	0	0	0	0	0	4	0
22	(North Macedonia)	FW	Ilčo Naumoski	1	0	0	0	0	0	1	0
24	(Azerbaijan)	MF	Fuad Bayramov	1	0	0	0	0	0	1	0
25	(Azerbaijan)	GK	Salahat Aghayev	1	0	0	0	0	0	1	0
27	(Costa Rica)	MF	Diego Madrigal	1	0	0	0	0	0	1	0
28	(Georgia (country))	FW	Bachana Tskhadadze	10	0	1	0	1	0	12	0
30	(Azerbaijan)	DF	Abbas Hüseynov	1	0	0	0	0	0	1	0
33	(Croatia)	MF	Matija Špičić	4	0	0	0	0	0	4	0
44	(Brazil)	DF	João Paulo	1	0	0	0	0	0	1	0
47	(Azerbaijan)	MF	Abdulla Abatsiyev	6	1	0	0	2	0	8	1
70	(Azerbaijan)	FW	Vagif Javadov	4	0	0	0	1	0	5	0
77	(Brazil)	MF	Flavio Beck	1	0	0	0	0	0	1	0
88	(Paraguay)	MF	David Meza	6	0	1	0	0	0	7	0
91	(Azerbaijan)	MF	Joshgun Diniyev	2	0	0	0	0	0	2	0
			TOTALS	83	1	6	0	8	0	97	1
