= 2012–13 FC Inter Baku season =

Inter Baku
2012–13 season
- President: Jahangir Hajiyev
- Manager: Kakhaber Tskhadadze
- Stadium: Shafa Stadium
- Premier League: 3rd
- Azerbaijan Cup: Quarterfinals vs Baku
- Europa League: 2nd Qualifying Round vs Asteras Tripoli
- Top goalscorer: League: Bachana Tskhadadze (8); All: Bachana Tskhadadze (12)
- Highest home attendance: 2,500 vs Neftchi Baku; 25 December 2012
- Lowest home attendance: 200 vs Simurq; 20 October 2012; Turan; 18 November 2012
- Average home league attendance: 894
Home colours	Away colours

The Inter Baku 2012–13 season is Inter Baku's twelfth Azerbaijan Premier League season, and their fourth season under manager Kakhaber Tskhadadze.

== Squad ==
As of 9 February 2013

Note: Flags indicate national team as defined under FIFA eligibility rules; some limited exceptions apply. Players may hold more than one non-FIFA nationality.

No.	Pos.	Nation	Player
1	GK	GEO	Giorgi Lomaia
4	DF	GEO	Valeri Abramidze
5	MF	MKD	Slavčo Georgievski
6	MF	AZE	Samir Zargarov
7	DF	AZE	Ruslan Amirjanov
8	MF	AZE	Nizami Hajiyev
9	MF	BUL	Daniel Genov
10	FW	GEO	Georgi Adamia
11	MF	AZE	Asif Mammadov
14	MF	BUL	Petar Zlatinov
15	DF	AZE	Volodimir Levin (captain)
18	DF	GEO	Ilia Kandelaki
19	FW	AZE	Ramil Mansurov

No.	Pos.	Nation	Player
20	DF	CGO	Bruce Abdoulaye
21	MF	AZE	Arif Dashdemirov
23	FW	BRA	Tales Schütz
24	MF	AZE	Fuad Bayramov
25	MF	SEN	Ibrahima Niasse
28	FW	GEO	Bachana Tskhadadze
29	DF	AZE	Ruslan Cafarov
30	FW	UKR	Yuriy Fomenko
47	MF	AZE	Abdulla Abatsiyev
74	GK	GEO	Revaz Tevdoradze
91	FW	BRA	Leonardo Rocha
96	GK	AZE	Elshan Poladov

=== Out on loan ===
Note: Flags indicate national team as defined under FIFA eligibility rules; some limited exceptions apply. Players may hold more than one non-FIFA nationality.

No. / Pos. / Nation / Player; 12 / GK / AZE / Asef Mirili (at Simurq)	No. / Pos. / Nation / Player; — / DF / AZE / Shahriyar Rahimov (at Ravan Baku)

== Transfers ==
=== Summer ===
In: Note: Flags indicate national team as defined under FIFA eligibility rules; some limited exceptions apply. Players may hold more than one non-FIFA nationality.

No.	Pos.	Nation	Player
5	MF	MKD	Slavčo Georgievski (from (Azerbaijan) Neftchi Baku)
7	MF	AZE	Ramil Hashimzade
10	FW	GEO	Giorgi Adamia (from (Azerbaijan) Qarabağ)
20	DF	CGO	Bruce Abdoulaye (from (France) Metz)
23	FW	BRA	Tales Schutz (from (Azerbaijan) AZAL)
30	FW	TOG	Arafat Djako (from (Russia) Anzhi Makhachkala)
47	MF	AZE	Abdulla Abatsiyev (from (Russia) Alania Vladikavkaz)
74	GK	GEO	Revaz Tevdoradze (from (Georgia (country)) Chikhura Sachkhere)
77	DF	AZE	Ruslan Amirjanov (from (Azerbaijan) Neftchi Baku)
87	DF	DOM	Heinz Barmettler (from (Switzerland) Zürich)
96	GK	AZE	Elshan Poladov (from (Azerbaijan) Kəpəz)

Out: Note: Flags indicate national team as defined under FIFA eligibility rules; some limited exceptions apply. Players may hold more than one non-FIFA nationality.

No.	Pos.	Nation	Player
2	DF	AZE	Khayal Mustafayev (to (Azerbaijan) Sumgayit)
5	DF	AZE	Rustam Abbasov (to (Azerbaijan) Simurq)
9	FW	BUL	Enyo Krastovchev
13	MF	CZE	Bronislav Červenka (to (Czech Republic) Zlín)
16	FW	AZE	Elnur Abdulov (to (Azerbaijan) Qarabağ)
20	FW	LAT	Ģirts Karlsons (to (Latvia) Liepājas Metalurgs)
22	DF	SVK	Peter Chrappan (to (Slovakia) Banská Bystrica)
29	DF	AZE	Aziz Guliyev (to (Azerbaijan) Baku)
30	DF	BRA	Danildo Accioly (to (Portugal) Santa Clara)
99	GK	AZE	Anar Maharramov (to (Azerbaijan) Sumgayit)

=== Winter ===
In: Note: Flags indicate national team as defined under FIFA eligibility rules; some limited exceptions apply. Players may hold more than one non-FIFA nationality.

No.	Pos.	Nation	Player
17	FW	BRA	Robertinho (from (Georgia (country)) Dinamo Tbilisi)
30	FW	UKR	Yuriy Fomenko (from (Azerbaijan) Kəpəz)
91	MF	BRA	Leonardo Rocha (from (Brazil) Olaria)

Out: Note: Flags indicate national team as defined under FIFA eligibility rules; some limited exceptions apply. Players may hold more than one non-FIFA nationality.

No.	Pos.	Nation	Player
17	MF	AZE	Aleksandr Gross (Released)
17	FW	BRA	Robertinho (Released)
30	FW	TOG	Arafat Djako (to (Israel) Bnei Sakhnin)
87	DF	DOM	Heinz Barmettler (to (Liechtenstein) FC Vaduz)

== Competitions ==
=== Friendlies ===
17 January 2013	Inter Baku (Azerbaijan)	1–1	(Germany) VfR Aalen	Belek, Turkey
18:00 AZT (UTC+4)	Zargarov 21'	Report	Dausch 79'	Stadium: Susesi Sport Center

=== Azerbaijan Premier League ===
==== Results summary ====
Overall								Home						Away					
Pld	W	D	L	GF	GA	GD	Pts	W	D	L	GF	GA	GD	W	D	L	GF	GA	GD
22	11	8	3	24	11	+13	41	7	4	0	14	4	+10	4	4	3	10	7	+3

Last updated: 3 March 2013.
Source: Soccerway

==== Results by round ====
Round	1	2	3	4	5	6	7	8	9	10	11	12	13	14	15	16	17	18	19	20	21	22
Ground	H	A	H	A	H	A	A	H	A	H	A	H	A	H	H	A	H	H	A	H	A	A
Result	D	L	D	W	W	D	W	W	D	W	D	W	L	W	D	W	W	D	W	W	L	D
Position	9		10	7	4	4	4	2	2	1	1	1	2	1	1	1	1	1	1	1	2	2

Source: Soccerway
A = Away; H = Home; W = Win; D = Draw; L = Loss

==== Results ====
3 August 2012 1	Inter Baku	1–1	Qarabağ	Baku
AZST (UTC+5)	Teli 89' (o.g.)	Summary	Muarem 37'	Stadium: Shafa Stadium; Attendance: 1,000; Referee: Fariz Yusifov

10 August 2012 2	Gabala	1–0	Inter Baku	Qabala
19:00 AZST (UTC+5)	Assis 13'	Summary		Stadium: Gabala City Stadium; Attendance: 2,000; Referee: Vusal Aliyev

19 August 2012 3	Inter Baku	0–0	Khazar Lankaran	Baku
18:30 AZST (UTC+5)		Summary		Stadium: Shafa Stadium; Attendance: 1,500; Referee: Aliyar Agayev

25 August 2012 4	Turan Tovuz	2–3	Inter Baku	Tovuz
18:00 AZST (UTC+5)	Ballo 73'; Mammadov 84'	Summary	Adamia 58'; Levin 88'; Georgievski 90+3'	Stadium: Tovuz City Stadium; Attendance: 2,000; Referee: Rahim Hasanov

15 September 2012 5	Inter Baku	1–0	Sumgayit	Baku
18:00 AZST (UTC+5)	Djako 6'	Summary		Stadium: Shafa Stadium; Attendance: 300; Referee: Rauf Jabbarov

23 September 2012 6	AZAL	0–0	Inter Baku	Baku
16:00 AZST (UTC+5)		Summary		Stadium: AZAL Stadium; Attendance: 500; Referee: Anar Salmanov

28 September 2012 7	Inter Baku	Postponed	Neftchi Baku	Baku
16:00 AZT (UTC+4)		[ Summary]		Stadium: Shafa Stadium

4 October 2012 8	Ravan Baku	0–2	Inter Baku	Baku
19:00 AZST (UTC+5)		Summary	Hajiyev 27'; Tskhadadze 61'	Stadium: Bayil Stadium; Attendance: 500; Referee: Rahim Hasanov

20 October 2012 9	Inter Baku	1–0	Simurq	Baku
18:00 AZST (UTC+5)	Tskhadadze 52'	Summary		Stadium: Dalga Arena; Attendance: 200; Referee: Anar Salmanov

26 October 2012 10	Baku	0–0	Inter Baku	Baku
16:00 AZST (UTC+5)		Summary		Stadium: Tofig Bakhramov Stadium; Attendance: 1,200; Referee: Vusal Aliyev

30 October 2012 11	Inter Baku	3–1	Kəpəz	Baku
18:00 AZT (UTC+4)	Niasse 39', 45'; Tskhadadze 55'	Summary	E.Azizov 5'	Stadium: AZAL Stadium; Attendance: 700; Referee: Fariz Yusifov

4 November 2012 12	Sumgayit	0–0	Inter Baku	Sumgayit
14:00 AZT (UTC+4)		Summary		Stadium: Mehdi Huseynzade Stadium; Attendance: 1,000; Referee: Rahim Hasanov

18 November 2012 13	Inter Baku	2–0	Turan	Baku
18:00 AZT (UTC+4)	Zargarov 11'; Tskhadadze 55'	Summary		Stadium: Tofig Bakhramov Stadium; Attendance: 200; Referee: Aliyar Ağayev

24 November 2012 14	Simurq	1–0	Inter Baku	Zaqatala
15:00 AZT (UTC+4)	Popović 53'	Summary		Stadium: Zaqatala City Stadium; Attendance: 1,200; Referee: Rauf Jabbarov

2 December 2012 15	Inter Baku	2–0	Ravan Baku	Baku
16:00 AZT (UTC+4)	Tskhadadze 51' (pen.); Zargarov 90+4'	Summary		Stadium: Shafa Stadium; Attendance: 700; Referee: Aliyar Ağayev

9 December 2012 16	Inter Baku	0–0	AZAL	Baku
15:15 AZT (UTC+4)		Summary		Stadium: Tofig Bakhramov Stadium; Attendance: 400; Referee: Fariz Yusifov

15 December 2012 17	Kəpəz	0–2	Inter Baku	Ganja
14:00 AZT (UTC+4)		Summary	Levin 23'; Hajiyev 72'	Stadium: Ganja City Stadium; Attendance: 1,000; Referee: Aliyar Ağayev

22 December 2012 18	Inter Baku	1–0	Baku	Baku
15:00 AZT (UTC+4)	Tskhadadze 58' (pen.)	Summary		Stadium: Shafa Stadium; Attendance: 350; Referee: Rauf Jabbarov

25 December 2012 7	Inter Baku	1–1	Neftchi	Baku
18:00 AZT (UTC+4)	Niasse 75'	Summary	Canales 11'	Stadium: Shafa Stadium; Attendance: 2,500; Referee: Vusal Aliyev

11 February 2013 19	Khazar Lankaran	2–3	Inter Baku	Lankaran
16:00 AZT (UTC+4)	Pamuk 52'; Ramazanov 83'	Summary	Mammadov 5'; Tskhadadze 30'; Zargarov 82'	Stadium: Lankaran City Stadium; Attendance: 11,000; Referee: Rahim Häsänov

16 February 2012 20	Inter	2–1	Gabala	Baku
15:00 AZT (UTC+4)	Dashdemirov 6'; Zargarov 73'	Summary	Kamanan 23'	Stadium: Shafa Stadium; Attendance: 1,000; Referee: Anar Salmanov

23 February 2013 21	Neftchi Baku	2–0	Inter Baku	Baku
17:00 AZT (UTC+4)	Canales 49'; Abramidze 90+2' (o.g.)	Summary		Stadium: Ismat Gayibov Stadium; Attendance: 5,000; Referee: Aliyar Ağayev

3 March 2013 22	Qarabağ	0–0	Inter Baku	Baku^{1}
17:00 AZT (UTC+4)		Summary		Stadium: Tofiq Bahramov Stadium; Attendance: 500; Referee: Vusal Aliyev

==== League table ====
Pos	Team	Pld	W	D	L	GF	GA	GD	Pts	Qualification
1	Neftçi Baku	22	14	2	6	47	24	+23	44	Qualification for championship group
2	Inter Baku	22	11	8	3	24	12	+12	41	Qualification for championship group
3	Qarabağ	22	10	9	3	30	19	+11	39	Qualification for championship group
4	Simurq	22	9	9	4	25	15	+10	36	Qualification for championship group
5	Gabala	22	9	5	8	26	27	−1	32	Qualification for championship group

Source: Association of Football Federations of Azerbaijan and Soccerway.com
Rules for classification: 1) points; 2) goal difference; 3) number of goals scored.

=== Azerbaijan Premier League Championship Group ===
==== Results summary ====
Overall								Home						Away					
Pld	W	D	L	GF	GA	GD	Pts	W	D	L	GF	GA	GD	W	D	L	GF	GA	GD
10	5	1	4	9	10	−1	16	3	1	1	3	2	+1	2	0	3	6	8	−2

Last updated: 20 May 2013.
Source: Soccerway

==== Results by round ====
Round	1	2	3	4	5	6	7	8	9	10
Ground	A	H	A	A	H	A	H	H	A	H
Result	W	L	W	L	W	L	W	D	L	W
Position	2	2	2	3	3	3	3	3	3	3

Updated to match(es) played on 20 May 2013. Source: Soccerway
A = Away; H = Home; W = Win; D = Draw; L = Loss

==== Results ====
13 March 2013 23	Gabala	1–2	Inter Baku	Qabala
15:00 AZT (UTC+4)	Mendy 62'	Summary	Mammadov 26'; Fomenko 29'	Stadium: Gabala City Stadium; Attendance: 1,500; Referee: Vusal Aliyev

30 March 2013 24	Inter Baku	0–1	Neftchi Baku	Baku
17:00 AZT (UTC+4)		Summary	Wobay 31'; Sadiqov (yellow card) 16' (yellow-red card) 74'	Stadium: Shafa Stadium; Attendance: 1,500; Referee: Anar Salmanov

6 April 2013 25	Baku	1–2	Inter Baku	Baku
15:00 AZST (UTC+5)	Nabiyev 90+3'	Summary	Mammadov 68'; Fomenko 81'	Stadium: Tofig Bakhramov Stadium; Attendance: 1,000; Referee: Fariz Yusifov

13 April 2013 26	Qarabağ	3–2	Inter Baku	Baku^{1}
15:00 AZST (UTC+5)	Medvedev 26'; Nadirov 46'; Opara	Summary	Fomenko 54'; F.Bayramov 57'	Stadium: Tofiq Bahramov Stadium; Attendance: 1,000; Referee: Aliyar Ağayev

20 April 2013 27	Inter Baku	5–0	Simurq	Baku
15:00 AZST (UTC+5)	Fomenko 4', 44'; Genov 37', 67'; Mansurov 59'	Summary	Božić (yellow card) 26' (yellow-red card) 30'	Stadium: Shafa Stadium; Attendance: 500; Referee: Elchin Mämmädov

28 April 2013 28	Neftchi	2–0	Inter Baku	Baku
18:00 AZST (UTC+5)	Canales 52', 70' (pen.)	Summary	Niasse (yellow card) 63' (yellow-red card) 69'	Stadium: Bakcell Arena; Attendance: 2,000; Referee: Vusal Aliyev

4 May 2013 29	Inter Baku	2–1	Baku	Baku
21:00 AZST (UTC+5)	Tskhadadze 35'; Rocha 41'	Summary	Huseynov 50'	Stadium: Shafa Stadium; Attendance: 650; Referee: Rauf Jabbarov

9 May 2013 30	Inter Baku	0–0	Qarabağ	Baku
19:00 AZST (UTC+5)		Summary		Stadium: Shafa Stadium; Attendance: 1,000; Referee: Aliyar Agayev

14 May 2013 31	Simurq	1–0	Inter Baku	Zaqatala
17:30 AZST (UTC+5)	Popović 39' (pen.); Gurbanov (red card) 54'	Summary	Levin (yellow card) 56' (yellow-red card) 74'	Stadium: Zaqatala City Stadium; Referee: Orkhan Mämmädov

19 May 2013 32	Inter Baku	1–0	Gabala	Baku
16:00 AZST (UTC+5)	Mansurov 87'	Summary		Stadium: Shafa Stadium; Attendance: 1,500; Referee: Aliyar Ağayev

==== Table ====
Pos	Team	Pld	W	D	L	GF	GA	GD	Pts	Qualification
1	Neftçi Baku (C)	32	19	5	8	59	32	+27	62	Qualification for Champions League second qualifying round
2	Qarabağ	32	16	11	5	43	26	+17	59	Qualification for Europa League first qualifying round
3	Inter Baku	32	16	9	7	38	22	+16	57	Qualification for Europa League first qualifying round
4	Simurq	32	12	12	8	32	26	+6	48	
5	Baku	32	9	14	9	33	27	+6	41	

Source: Soccerway.com
Rules for classification: 1) points; 2) goal difference; 3) number of goals scored.
(C) Champions

=== Azerbaijan Cup ===
28 November 2012 Second Round	MOIK Baku	0–3	Inter Baku	Baku
18:00 AZT (UTC+4)		Summary	Niasse 22'; Hajiyev 35'; Mammadov 56'	Stadium: Shafa Stadium; Attendance: 500; Referee: Elchin Mämmädov

27 February 2013 Quarterfinals 1st leg	Baku	1–1	Inter Baku	Baku
15:00 AZT (UTC+4)	Nabiyev 90+2'	Summary	Kandelaki 80'	Stadium: Tofig Bakhramov Stadium; Attendance: 1,000; Referee: Rahim Häsänov

7 March 2013 Quarterfinals 2nd leg	Inter Baku	2–2 (3–3 a agg.)	Baku	Baku
16:00 AZT (UTC+4)	Tskhadadze 42', 60'	Summary	Šolić 32'; Aliyev 68'	Stadium: Shafa Stadium; Attendance: 1,500; Referee: Anar Salmanov

=== UEFA Europa League ===
==== Qualifying phase ====
5 July 2012 1st qualifying round 1st leg	Narva Trans (Estonia)	0–5	(Azerbaijan) Inter Baku	Narva
20:30 AZST (UTC+5)		Report	Tskhadadze 12', 36'; Mammadov 63'; Adamia 71'; Hajiyev 78' (pen.)	Stadium: Kreenholmi Stadium^{2} Attendance: 300; Referee: Alexandre Boucaut (Belgium)

12 July 2012 1st qualifying round 2nd leg	Inter Baku (Azerbaijan)	2–0 (7–0 agg.)	(Estonia) Narva Trans	Baku
21:00 AZST (UTC+5)	Georgievski 22'; Hajiyev 86'	Report		Stadium: Dalga Arena^{3} Attendance: 990; Referee: Kevin Clancy (Scotland)

19 July 2012 2nd qualifying round 1st leg	Inter Baku (Azerbaijan)	1–1	(Greece) Asteras Tripoli	Baku
21:00 AZST (UTC+5)	Schutz 46'	Report	Usero 54'	Stadium: Dalga Arena^{3} Attendance: 2,000; Referee: Mihaly Fabian (Hungary)

26 July 2012 2nd qualifying round 2nd leg	Asteras Tripoli (Greece)	1–1 (a.e.t.) (2–2 agg.) (4–2 p)	(Azerbaijan) Inter Baku	Tripoli
22:00 AZST (UTC+5)	Navarro 68'	Report	Schutz 88'	Stadium: Asteras Tripolis Stadium; Attendance: 2,661; Referee: Lars Christoffersen (Denmark)
	Penalties
	Tsabouris (penalty missed); Rayos (penalty scored); Usero (penalty scored); Juanito (penalty scored); Perrone (penalty scored)		(penalty missed) Georgievski; (penalty scored) Tskhadadze; (penalty missed) Barmettler; (penalty scored) Genov

== Squad statistics ==
As of 20 May 2013

=== Appearances and goals ===
No.	Pos	Nat	Player	Total		Premier League		Azerbaijan Cup		Europa League	
No.	Pos	Nat	Player	Apps	Goals	Apps	Goals	Apps	Goals	Apps	Goals
1	GK	(Georgia (country)) GEO	Giorgi Lomaia	29	0	25+0	0	1+0	0	3+0	0
4	DF	(Georgia (country)) GEO	Valeri Abramidze	21	0	9+6	0	3+0	0	3+0	0
5	MF	(North Macedonia) MKD	Slavčo Georgievski	37	2	30+0	1	3+0	0	4+0	1
6	FW	(Azerbaijan) AZE	Samir Zargarov	22	4	10+9	4	3+0	0	0+0	0
7	DF	(Azerbaijan) AZE	Ruslan Amirjanov	25	0	19+2	0	2+0	0	2+0	0
8	MF	(Azerbaijan) AZE	Nizami Hajiyev	26	5	10+10	2	1+1	1	1+3	2
9	MF	(Bulgaria) BUL	Daniel Genov	24	2	4+15	2	1+0	0	0+4	0
10	FW	(Georgia (country)) GEO	Giorgi Adamia	9	2	4+1	1	0+0	0	4+0	1
11	MF	(Azerbaijan) AZE	Asif Mammadov	38	5	24+7	3	2+1	1	3+1	1
13	MF	(Azerbaijan) AZE	Joshgun Diniyev	2	0	0+2	0	0+0	0	0+0	0
14	DF	(Bulgaria) BUL	Petar Zlatinov	2	0	0+0	0	0+0	0	1+1	0
15	DF	(Azerbaijan) AZE	Volodimir Levin	35	2	28+0	2	3+0	0	4+0	0
18	DF	(Georgia (country)) GEO	Ilia Kandelaki	30	1	25+0	0	2+0	1	3+0	0
20	DF	(Republic of the Congo) CGO	Bruce Abdoulaye	35	0	27+2	0	2+0	0	4+0	0
21	MF	(Azerbaijan) AZE	Arif Dashdemirov	29	1	18+7	1	1+0	0	3+0	0
23	FW	(Brazil) BRA	Tales Schutz	15	2	4+6	0	0+1	0	2+2	2
24	MF	(Azerbaijan) AZE	Fuad Bayramov	18	1	12+4	1	1+1	0	0+0	0
25	MF	(Senegal) SEN	Ibrahima Niasse	32	4	26+1	3	2+0	1	3+0	0
28	FW	(Georgia (country)) GEO	Bachana Tskhadadze	35	12	28+1	8	3+0	2	2+1	2
30	FW	(Ukraine) UKR	Yuriy Fomenko	14	5	10+2	5	1+1	0	0+0	0
29	DF	(Azerbaijan) AZE	Ruslan Cafarov	3	0	1+2	0	0+0	0	0+0	0
47	MF	(Azerbaijan) AZE	Abdulla Abatsiyev	20	0	16+2	0	2+0	0	0+0	0
74	GK	(Georgia (country)) GEO	Revaz Tevdoradze	8	0	6+0	0	1+0	0	1+0	0
77	FW	(Azerbaijan) AZE	Ramil Mansurov	4	2	1+3	2	0+0	0	0+0	0
87	DF	(Azerbaijan) AZE	İlqar Äläkbärov	8	0	5+3	0	0+0	0	0+0	0
91	MF	(Brazil) BRA	Leonardo Rocha	9	1	3+6	1	0+0	0	0+0	0
96	GK	(Azerbaijan) AZE	Elshan Poladov	2	0	1+0	0	1+0	0	0+0	0
Players who left Inter Baku during the season:
7	MF	(Azerbaijan) AZE	Ramil Hashimzade	4	0	2+2	0	0+0	0	0+0	0
17	DF	(Azerbaijan) AZE	Aleksandr Gross	1	0	0+0	0	1+0	0	0+0	0
17	FW	(Brazil) BRA	Robertinho	2	0	0+1	0	0+1	0	0+0	0
30	FW	(Togo) TOG	Arafat Djako	4	1	3+1	1	0+0	0	0+0	0
87	DF	(Dominican Republic) DOM	Heinz Barmettler	3	0	2+0	0	0+0	0	1+0	0

=== Goal scorers ===
Place	Position	Nation	Number	Name	Premier League	Azerbaijan Cup	Europa League	Total
1	FW	(Georgia (country))	28	Bachana Tskhadadze	8	2	2	12
2	FW	(Ukraine)	30	Yuriy Fomenko	5	0	0	5
3	MF	(Azerbaijan)	8	Nizami Hajiyev	2	1	2	5
3	MF	(Azerbaijan)	11	Asif Mammadov	3	1	1	5
5	MF	(Senegal)	25	Ibrahima Niasse	3	1	0	4
5	FW	(Azerbaijan)	6	Samir Zargarov	4	0	0	4
7	DF	(Azerbaijan)	15	Volodimir Levin	2	0	0	2
7	FW	(Bulgaria)	9	Daniel Genov	2	0	0	2
7	FW	(Azerbaijan)	77	Ramil Mansurov	2	0	0	2
7	FW	(Georgia (country))	10	Giorgi Adamia	1	0	1	2
7	MF	(North Macedonia)	5	Slavčo Georgievski	1	0	1	2
7	FW	(Brazil)	23	Tales Schutz	0	0	2	2
13	FW	(Togo)	30	Arafat Djako	1	0	0	1
13	MF	(Azerbaijan)	21	Arif Dashdemirov	1	0	0	1
13	MF	(Azerbaijan)	24	Fuad Bayramov	1	0	0	1
13	FW	(Brazil)	91	Leonardo Rocha	1	0	0	1
13	DF	(Georgia (country))	18	Ilia Kandelaki	0	1	0	1
13				Own goal	1	0	0	1
				TOTALS	38	6	9	53

=== Disciplinary record ===
Number	Nation	Position	Name	Premier League		Azerbaijan Cup		Europa League		Total	
Number	Nation	Position	Name	Yellow card	Red card	Yellow card	Red card	Yellow card	Red card	Yellow card	Red card
1	(Georgia (country))	GK	Giorgi Lomaia	3	0	0	0	0	0	3	0
4	(Georgia (country))	DF	Valeri Abramidze	4	0	1	0	0	0	5	0
5	(North Macedonia)	MF	Slavčo Georgievski	8	0	0	0	0	0	8	0
6	(Azerbaijan)	FW	Samir Zargarov	4	0	0	0	0	0	4	0
7	(Azerbaijan)	FW	Ruslan Amirjanov	3	0	0	0	0	0	3	0
8	(Azerbaijan)	MF	Nizami Hajiyev	1	0	0	0	1	0	2	0
9	(Bulgaria)	MF	Daniel Genov	1	0	0	0	0	0	1	0
10	(Georgia (country))	FW	Giorgi Adamia	1	0	0	0	1	0	2	0
11	(Azerbaijan)	FW	Asif Mammadov	6	0	0	0	1	0	7	0
15	(Azerbaijan)	DF	Volodimir Levin	11	1	2	0	0	0	13	1
17	(Brazil)	FW	Robertinho	1	0	0	0	0	0	1	0
18	(Georgia (country))	DF	Ilia Kandelaki	4	0	1	0	0	0	5	0
20	(Republic of the Congo)	DF	Bruce Abdoulaye	9	0	0	0	1	0	10	0
21	(Azerbaijan)	MF	Arif Dashdemirov	4	0	0	0	0	0	4	0
23	(Brazil)	FW	Tales Schutz	1	0	0	0	1	0	2	0
24	(Azerbaijan)	MF	Fuad Bayramov	4	0	0	0	0	0	4	0
25	(Senegal)	MF	Ibrahima Niasse	5	1	0	0	0	0	5	1
28	(Georgia (country))	FW	Bachana Tskhadadze	3	0	1	0	1	0	5	0
29	(Azerbaijan)	DF	Ruslan Cafarov	1	0	0	0	0	0	1	0
47	(Azerbaijan)	MF	Abdulla Abatsiyev	7	0	1	0	1	0	9	0
74	(Georgia (country))	GK	Revaz Tevdoradze	2	0	1	0	0	0	3	0
77	(Azerbaijan)	DF	Ruslan Amirjanov	4	0	0	0	0	0	4	0
91	(Brazil)	MF	Leonardo Rocha	1	0	0	0	0	0	1	0
			TOTALS	88	2	7	0	6	0	99	2

== Team kit ==
These are the 2012–13 Inter Baku kits.

Supplier: Umbro
Sponsor(s): IBA

Inter Baku 's Home Kit	Inter Baku's Away Kit
