= Fuad Bayramov =

Fuad Bayramov may refer to:

- Fuad Bayramov (footballer, born 1994)
- Fuad Bayramov (footballer, born 1998)
