= Ruslan Amirjanov =

Azerbaijani defender (born 1985)

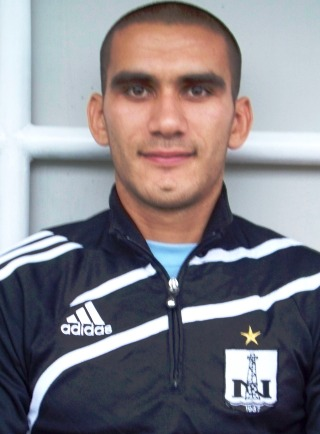

Personal information
- Full name: Ruslan Ramiz oglu Amirjanov
- Date of birth: 1 February 1985 (age 41)
- Place of birth: Mingachevir, Azerbaijan SSR, Soviet Union
- Height: 1.76 m (5 ft 9 in)
- Position: Defender

Team information
- Current team: Jabrayil
- Number: 20

Senior career*
Years	Team	Apps	(Gls)
2001–2002	Umud Baku	2	(0)
2003–2004	Adliyya Baku	23	(1)
2004–2007	FK Karvan	54	(0)
2007–2009	Standard Sumgayit	43	(0)
2009–2012	Neftchi Baku	54	(2)
2012–2014	Inter Baku	46	(2)
2014–2015	Gabala	7	(0)
2015–2016	Inter Baku	16	(0)
2016–2017	AZAL	26	(2)
2017-2018	Sabail	2	(0)
2018–2022	Shamakhi	1	(0)
2024–	Jabrayil		

International career^{‡}
–	Azerbaijan U-17	-	(-)
–	Azerbaijan U-19	-	(-)
2003–2006	Azerbaijan U-21	-	(-)
2008–2014	Azerbaijan	3	(0)
- * Club domestic league appearances and goals as of 11 April 2024 ‡ National team caps and goals as of 28 May 2014

Ruslan Amirjanov (Azerbaijani: Ruslan Əmircanov; born 1 February 1985, in Mingachevir, Soviet Union) is an Azerbaijani defender who plays for the Jabrayil FK.

== Career ==
=== Club ===
On 23 May 2014, Amirjanov signed a one-year contract with Gabala FC.

Amirjanov was released by Sabail FK at the end of the 2017–18 season.

On 30 August 2018, Amirjanov signed a one-year contract with Keşla FK.

=== International ===
Ruslan debuted for Azerbaijan in 2008, and so far has 3 caps.

== Career statistics ==
=== Club ===
As of match played 3 December 2019

Appearances and goals by club, season and competition
Club	Season	League			National Cup		Continental		Total	
Club	Season	Division	Apps	Goals	Apps	Goals	Apps	Goals	Apps	Goals
Karvan	2004–05	Azerbaijan Premier League	27	0			—		27	0
Karvan	2005–06	Azerbaijan Premier League	6	0					6	0
Karvan	2006–07	Azerbaijan Premier League	21	0			0	0	21	0
Karvan	Total		54	0			0	0	54	0
Standard Sumgayit	2007–08	Azerbaijan Premier League	17	0			—		17	0
Standard Sumgayit	2008–09	Azerbaijan Premier League	25	0			—		25	0
Standard Sumgayit	Total		42	0			-	-	42	0
Neftchi Baku	2009–10	Azerbaijan Premier League	21	0			—		21	0
Neftchi Baku	2010–11	Azerbaijan Premier League	12	0	0	0	—		12	0
Neftchi Baku	2011–12	Azerbaijan Premier League	21	2	6	0	1	0	28	2
Neftchi Baku	Total		54	2	6	0	1	0	61	2
Inter Baku	2012–13	Azerbaijan Premier League	21	0	2	0	2	0	25	0
Inter Baku	2013–14	Azerbaijan Premier League	25	2	3	0	4	0	32	2
Inter Baku	Total		46	2	5	0	6	0	57	2
Gabala	2014–15	Azerbaijan Premier League	7	0	0	0	2	0	9	0
Inter Baku	2015–16	Azerbaijan Premier League	16	0	4	0	0	0	20	0
AZAL	2016–17	Azerbaijan Premier League	26	2	3	0	—		29	2
Sabail	2017–18	Azerbaijan Premier League	2	0	0	0	—		2	0
Keşla	2018–19	Azerbaijan Premier League	1	0	0	0	0	0	1	0
Keşla	2019–20	Azerbaijan Premier League	0	0	1	1	-		1	1
Keşla	Total		1	0	1	1	0	0	2	1
Career total			248	6	19	1	9	0	276	7

=== International ===
Azerbaijan
Year	Apps	Goals
2010	2	0
2011	0	0
2012	0	0
2013	0	0
2014	2	0
Total	4	0

Statistics accurate as of match played 3 September 2014

== Achievements ==
Neftchi Baku

- Azerbaijan Premier League (2): 2010–11, 2011–12
