= Iván Benítez =

Spanish footballer

Personal information
- Full name: Iván Alejandro Benítez
- Date of birth: 31 May 1988 (age 38)
- Place of birth: Las Palmas, Spain
- Height: 1.80 m (5 ft 11 in)
- Position: Centre back

Youth career
- Faycan
- Las Palmas

Senior career*
Years	Team	Apps	(Gls)
2007–2009	Las Palmas B	19	(1)
2007	Las Palmas	1	(0)
2009–2010	Barcelona B	12	(0)
2010	Atlético Madrid B	7	(0)
2011	Doxa	10	(0)
2011–2013	Nea Salamis	46	(0)
2013–2015	Inter Baku	28	(0)

International career
2007	Spain U19	1	(0)
- * Club domestic league appearances and goals as of 12 May 2015

Iván Alejandro Benítez (born 31 May 1988) is a Spanish professional footballer who plays as a central defender.

== Club career ==
Benítez was born in Las Palmas, Canary Islands. Save for one Segunda División match with UD Las Palmas he competed solely in lower league football in his country, representing UD Las Palmas Atlético, FC Barcelona B and Atlético Madrid B.

Abroad, Benítez played for Doxa Katokopias FC and Nea Salamis Famagusta FC (both in Cyprus), and Inter Baku PIK in the Azerbaijan Premier League.

== Club statistics ==
As of match played on 17 April 2015

Club	Season	League			Cup		Other		Total	
Club	Season	Division	Apps	Goals	Apps	Goals	Apps	Goals	Apps	Goals
Las Palmas	2007–08	Segunda División	1	0	1	0	—		2	0
Barcelona B	2009–10	Segunda División B	9	0	—		—		9	0
Atlético Madrid B	2009–10	Segunda División B	7	0	—		—		7	0
Doxa	2010–11	Cypriot First Division	9	0	0	0	—		9	0
Nea Salamis	2011–12	Cypriot First Division	23	0	1	0	—		24	0
Nea Salamis	2012–13	Cypriot First Division	23	0	2	0	—		25	0
Nea Salamis	Total		46	0	3	0	—		49	0
Inter Baku	2013–14	Azerbaijan Premier League	23	0	1	0	3 (Note: Appearances in UEFA Europa League)	0	27	0
Inter Baku	2014–15	Azerbaijan Premier League	5	0	0	0	2	0	7	0
Inter Baku	2015–16	Azerbaijan Premier League	0	0	0	0	0	0	0	0
Inter Baku	Total		28	0	1	0	5	0	34	0
Career total			100	0	5	0	5	0	110	0
