= Matija Špičić =

Croatian footballer

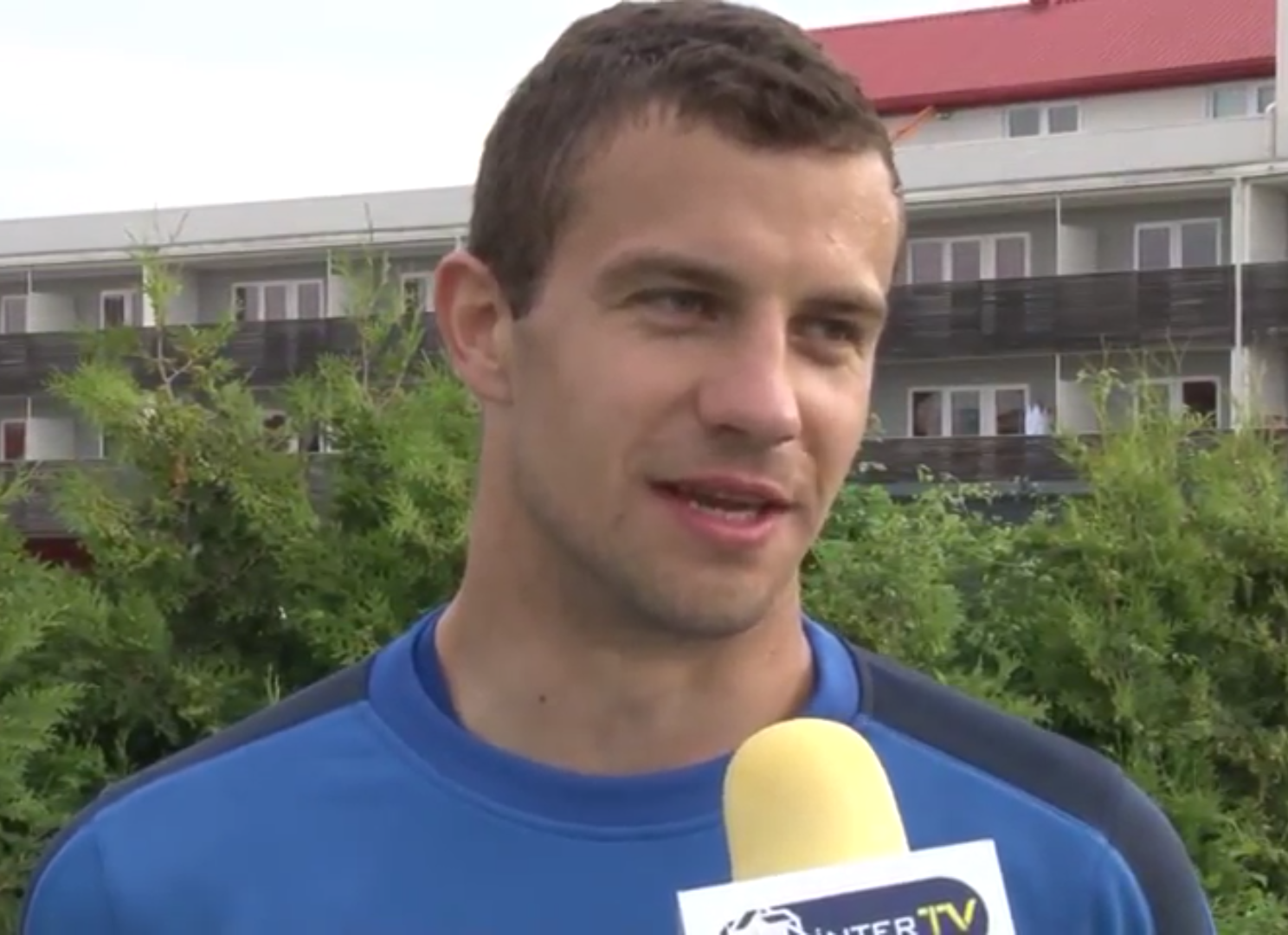

Personal information
- Date of birth: 24 February 1988 (age 38)
- Place of birth: Zagreb, SR Croatia, SFR Yugoslavia
- Height: 1.75 m (5 ft 9 in)
- Position: Left-back

Team information
- Current team: NK Kralj Tomislav

Youth career
- NK Zagreb

Senior career*
Years	Team	Apps	(Gls)
2006–2011	NK Zagreb	48	(2)
2011	Tavriya Simferopol	3	(0)
2011	Istra 1961	8	(0)
2012–2013	Sibir Novosibirsk	40	(3)
2013–2015	Inter Baku	36	(6)
2015–2016	Osijek	17	(0)
2016–2017	Dinamo Tbilisi	3	(0)
2017	Wisła Kraków	6	(0)
2018–2020	Gorica	29	(0)
2020	Varaždin	7	(0)
2020–2022	Ravnice		
2022–	Kralj Tomislav		

International career
2003–2004	Croatia U16	4	(3)
2004–2005	Croatia U17	14	(2)
2005–2006	Croatia U18	5	(3)
2006–2007	Croatia U19	7	(3)
2009	Croatia U20	3	(0)
- * Club domestic league appearances and goals as of 24 July 2020

Matija Špičić (born 24 February 1988) is a Croatian footballer who plays as a left-back for NK Kralj Tomislav.

== Club career ==
Špičić joined NK Zagreb as a twelve-year-old. A product of NK Zagreb youth academy, he was promoted to first team in April 2006 and has been playing for the club ever since, usually as left winger. Although he was seen as one of the most talented NK Zagreb young players, his career suffered a setback when he broke his leg twice in 2008. After a period of recovery, he is now a first-team regular with the team.

As of October 2009, he has earned 33 caps and scored 11 goals for Croatia's national team at various youth levels between 2003 and 2009. and was a first-team member of the squad which participated at the 2005 European Under-17 Championship.

In June 2013 Špičić signed with Azerbaijan Premier League side Inter Baku.

== Career statistics ==
As of 13 July 2015

Club performance			League		Cup		Continental		Total	
Season	Club	League	Apps	Goals	Apps	Goals	Apps	Goals	Apps	Goals
2010–11	Tavriya Simferopol	Ukrainian Premier League	3	0	0	0	-		5	0
2011–12	Istra 1961	Prva HNL	8	0	1	0	-		9	0
2011–12	Sibir Novosibirsk	FNL	12	1	0	0	-		12	1
2012–13	Sibir Novosibirsk	FNL	28	2	1	0	-		29	2
2013–14	Inter Baku	Azerbaijan Premier League	29	5	3	1	2	0	34	6
2014–15	Inter Baku	Azerbaijan Premier League	7	1	2	0	4	0	13	1
Total	Ukraine		3	0	0	0	-		3	0
Total	Croatia		8	0	1	0	-		9	0
Total	Russia		40	3	1	0	-		41	3
Total	Azerbaijan		36	6	5	1	6	0	47	7
Career total			87	9	7	1	6	0	100	10
