= Ivo Táborský =

Czech footballer

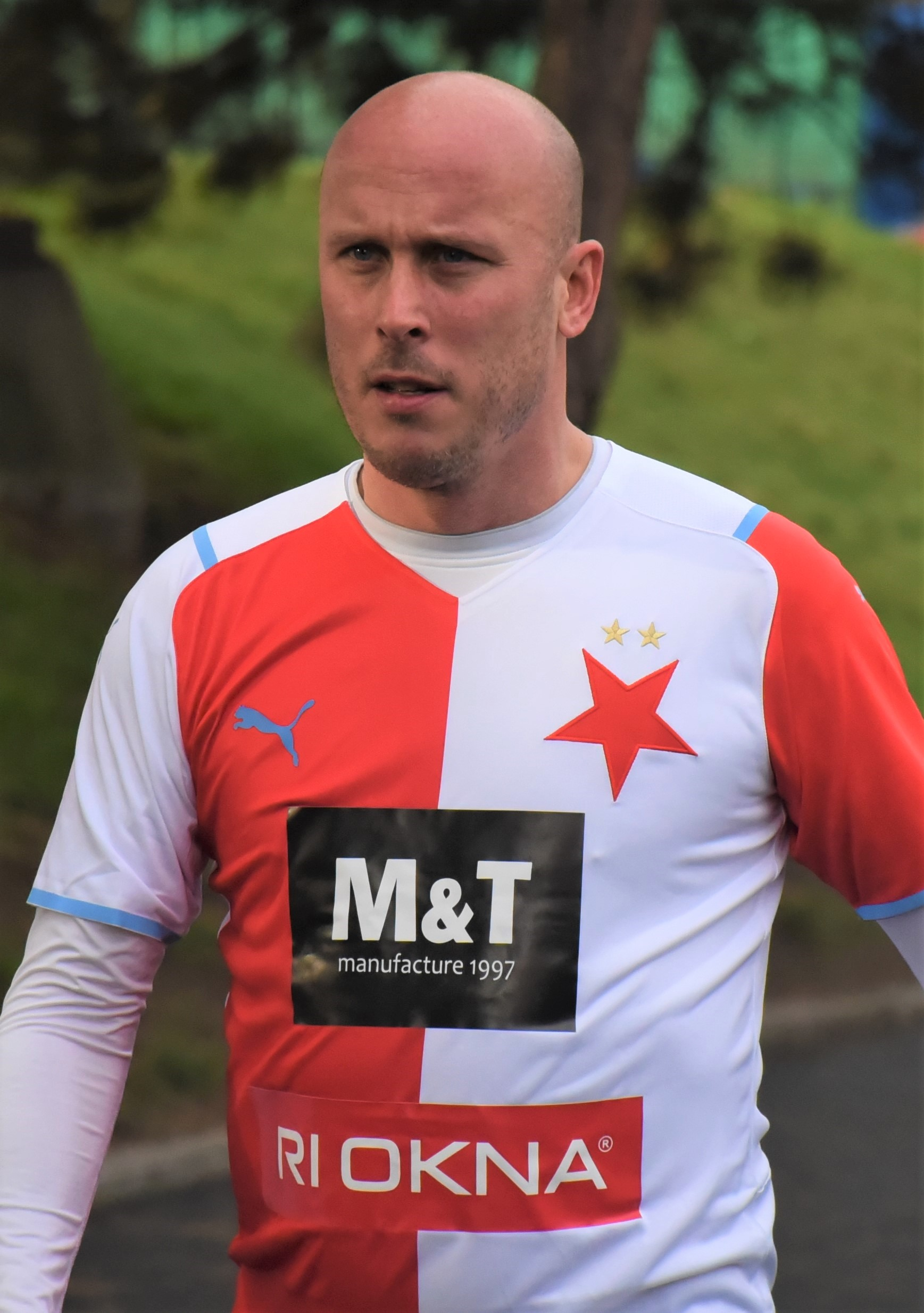
- Táborský in 2022

Personal information
- Full name: Ivo Táborský
- Date of birth: 10 May 1985 (age 41)
- Place of birth: Prague, Czechoslovakia
- Height: 1.84 m (6 ft 1/2 in)
- Positions: Attacking midfielder; left midfielder

Youth career
- Slavia Praha

Senior career*
Years	Team	Apps	(Gls)
2001–2006	Slavia Praha	4	(0)
2003–2004	→ Bohemians 1905 (loan)	16	(2)
2004	→ FK Příbram (loan)	6	(0)
2005–2007	→ České Budějovice (loan)	20	(9)
2007–2013	FK Mladá Boleslav	105	(11)
2011	→ Slovan Bratislava (loan)	9	(1)
2012–2013	→ České Budějovice (loan)	22	(4)
2013–2016	Teplice	47	(6)
2014	→ Inter Baku (loan)	6	(0)
2016–2020	České Budějovice	58	(17)

International career^{‡}
2000–2001	Czech Republic U15	9	(4)
2001	Czech Republic U16	3	(0)
2001	Czech Republic U17	9	(2)
2002–2003	Czech Republic U18	10	(0)
2004	Czech Republic U19	1	(1)
2006	Czech Republic U21	1	(0)
- * Club domestic league appearances and goals as of 1 July 2018 ‡ National team caps and goals as of 25 December 2014

Ivo Táborský (born 10 May 1985, in Prague) is a former Czech football midfielder who last played for České Budějovice. He is a product of the Slavia Prague youth academy.

== Career ==
On 5 February 2014, Táborský signed a six-month contract loan deal with Azerbaijan Premier League side Inter Baku, with an option of a permanent move. Táborský made six substitute appearances for Inter Baku, and with the Inter declining to take up the opportunity to make the move permanent, Táborský went on trial with Erzgebirge Aue.
