= João Paulo (footballer, born April 1988) =

Brazilian footballer

Personal information
- Full name: João Paulo de Souza Dantas
- Date of birth: 7 April 1988 (age 38)
- Place of birth: São Paulo, Brazil
- Height: 1.89 m (6 ft 2 in)
- Position: Defender

Youth career
- 2003–2007: Palmeiras
- 2008: Ipatinga

Senior career*
Years	Team	Apps	(Gls)
2009	Ipatinga	0	(0)
2009–2010	Freamunde	19	(0)
2010–2011	Santo André	2	(0)
2012	Chengdu Blades	14	(0)
2013	Bragantino	0	(0)
2013–2014	Inter Baku	5	(0)
2014	Sorocaba	3	(0)
2014	Chaves	0	(0)
2015	Oeste	0	(0)
2015	Mogi Mirim	0	(0)
2015–2016	CSMS Iași	2	(0)
2016	SE Gama	19	(0)
2016–2018	América FC	0	(0)
2018	Doxa Drama	0	(0)
- * Club domestic league appearances and goals as of 23 May 2016

João Paulo de Souza Dantas (born 7 April 1988), simply known as João Paulo is a Brazilian professional footballer who plays as a defender.
