= Heinz Barmettler =

Dominican footballer (born 1987)

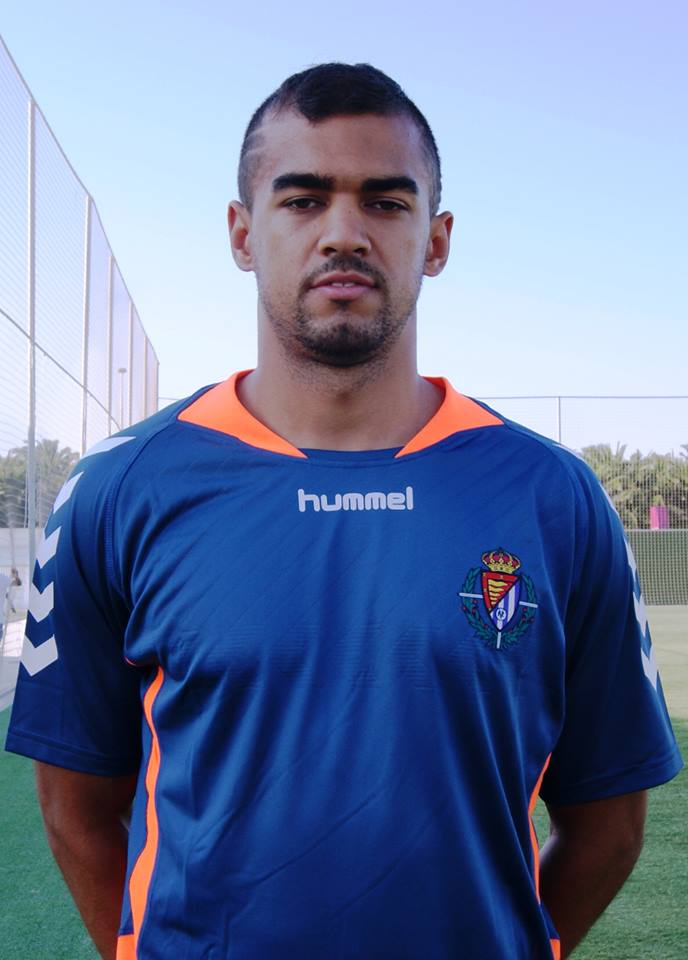
- Barmettler in training with Valladolid in 2013

Personal information
- Full name: Heinz Barmettler Veloz
- Date of birth: 21 July 1987 (age 39)
- Place of birth: Zürich, Switzerland
- Height: 1.81 m (5 ft 11 in)
- Position: Centre back

Youth career
- 1993–1999: FC Blue Stars Zürich
- 1999–2005: Grasshopper

Senior career*
Years	Team	Apps	(Gls)
2005–2006	Grasshopper B	29	(6)
2006–2012	FC Zürich	110	(0)
2012	Inter Baku	2	(0)
2013	Vaduz	0	(0)
2013–2014	Valladolid	1	(0)
2015	Cibao FC	7	(0)
2016	SC Freiburg II	2	(0)
Total		151	(6)

International career
2006–2009	Switzerland U21	9	(0)
2009	Switzerland	1	(0)
2012–2016	Dominican Republic	11	(0)
- * Club domestic league appearances and goals

Heinz Barmettler Veloz (born 21 July 1987) is a retired professional footballer who played as a central defender. Born in Switzerland, he represented the Dominican Republic internationally.

== Club career ==
Barmettler was born in Zurich, Switzerland to a Swiss father and a Dominican mother. His father, Heinz Barmettler Sr., is a vice-president of FC Blue Stars Zürich.

Barmettler was part of the 2006–07 Swiss Championship winning team FC Zürich.

On 12 July 2012 Barmettler joined Inter Baku on a two-year contract. On 7 January 2013, he moved to FC Vaduz on a 6-month contract, with the option of another 2 years, on a free transfer.

On 2 August 2013 following a successful trial period in the summer with Real Valladolid, the club have opted to sign Barmettler on a two-year contract, making him the first Dominican player to play in La Liga. He made his debut in the competition on the 24th, playing the full 90 minutes in a 1–2 away loss against Villarreal CF.

On 14 July 2014 Barmettler rescinded with the Pucelanos, after their relegation. On 4 March of the following year he returned to his homeland, being presented at Cibao FC.

== International career ==
On 14 November 2009, Barmettler had made his international debut for Switzerland in the 0–1 home loss to Norway, playing the full 90 minutes. However, as the match was friendly and in addition he was never called after that date, Barmettler chose to change his FIFA nationality into Dominican Republic in 2012.

His first match with the Dominican national team was in the 2012 Caribbean Championship. He debuted on 24 September of that year in a 2–2 draw against Aruba. He was the captain of the Dominican national team.

== Career statistics ==
As of 7 April 2014

Club statistics
Season	Club	League	League		Cup		Other		Total	
Season	Club	League	App	Goals	App	Goals	App	Goals	App	Goals
2005–06	Grasshopper	Swiss Super League	0	0	1	0	0	0	1	0
2006–07	FC Zürich	Swiss Super League	17	0	2	0	0	0	19	0
2007–08	FC Zürich	Swiss Super League	20	0	2	0	1	0	23	0
2008–09	FC Zürich	Swiss Super League	27	0	3	1	4	0	34	1
2009–10	FC Zürich	Swiss Super League	18	0	3	0	3	0	24	0
2010–11	FC Zürich	Swiss Super League	3	0	0	0	1	0	4	0
2011–12	FC Zürich	Swiss Super League	15	0	0	0	3	0	18	0
2012–13	Inter Baku	Azerbaijan Premier League	2	0	0	0	1	0	3	0
2012–13	FC Vaduz	Swiss Challenge League	0	0	0	0	-		0	0
2013–14	Real Valladolid	La Liga	1	0	0	0	9	-	10	0
2015	Cibao FC	Liga Mayor	7	0	0	0	-	-	7	0
Total			110	0	11	1	13	0	143	1
