= Diego Madrigal =

Costa Rican footballer (born 1989)

Personal information
- Full name: Diego Josué Madrigal Ulloa
- Date of birth: 19 March 1989 (age 37)
- Place of birth: San José, Costa Rica
- Height: 1.70 m (5 ft 7 in)
- Position: Midfielder

Team information
- Current team: Municipal Liberia
- Number: 7

Senior career*
Years	Team	Apps	(Gls)
2008–2010	UCR	36	(8)
2010	Herediano	13	(3)
2011	Cerro Porteño	5	(0)
2011–2012	Herediano	15	(0)
2012	Santos de Guápiles	14	(5)
2013	Saprissa	31	(6)
2014–2015	Inter Baku	10	(0)
2015	Belén	11	(2)
2016	Alajuelense	42	(13)
2017	Suphanburi	14	(3)
2018	Santos de Guápiles	15	(1)
2018–2020	San Carlos	49	(4)
2020	Cariari Pococí		
2021–2022	Sporting San Jose	31	(3)
2022–	Municipal Liberia	46	(3)

International career
2009	Costa Rica U-20	7	(1)
2010	Costa Rica U-21	2	(4)
2011	Costa Rica U-23	4	(1)
2010–2016	Costa Rica	11	(1)
- * Club domestic league appearances and goals as of 19:50, 5 October 2024 (UTC)

Diego Josué Madrigal Ulloa (born 19 March 1989) is a Costa Rican professional footballer who plays as a midfielder for Municipal Liberia in the Liga FPD. He was a member of Costa Rica's under-20 team that finished fourt at the 2009 FIFA U-20 World Cup in Egypt.

== Club career ==
Madrigal made his Primera debut for UCR in January 2009 and scored his first Primera goal in March of that year. After leaving a good image at the 2009 FIFA U-20 World Cup, Euro Data Marketing, which represented Madrigal, intended transferring him to European football, ultimately signing for Sport Heredino. At UCR, Madrigal disputed 23 games and noted 4 goals.

=== Cerro Porteño ===
In December 2010, it was announced that Madrigal was Cerro Porteño's new striker. Madrigal signed for one year. In Madrigal's team was Jonathan Fabbro, Fredy Bareiro, Roberto Nanni, Javier Villarreal, Juan Manuel Lucero, Julio dos Santos, Rodrigo Burgos, Mathías Corujo, Luis Nuñez and Diego Barreto. In January 2010, Madrigal was expected to play in a friendly match for Cerro Porteño against Atlético Paranaense's B Team. Madrigal was usually a substitute in Cerro Porteño's team. On 13 February 2011, Madrigal made his first league appearance for Cerro Porteño in a 2–2 draw against Rubio Ñu, when he was substituted onto the field for Ivan Torres in the 55th minute. Whilst at Cerro Porteño, his national team selected him for the 2011 Copa América squad. In June 2011, Madrigal was associated with a move to Deportivo Saprissa.

=== Herediano ===
In August 2011, he returned to his former club Herediano.

=== Santos de Guápiles ===
In August 2012, he joined Santos de Guápiles.

=== Inter Baku ===
In January 2014, Madrigal signed for Azerbaijan Premier League side Inter Baku on a two-year contract.

=== Belén ===
In September 2015, Madrigal returned to Costa Rica, signing with Belén

=== Sporting San José ===
For the 2020/21 season, Madrigal joined Sporting San José.

== International career ==
Madrigal played for the Costa Rica national football team at the 2009 FIFA U-20 World Cup in Egypt, where the team finished in fourth place. On 26 January 2010, Madrigal made his first appearance and scored his first goal for the senior side in a friendly match against Argentina. In May 2011, Madrigal scored in a victory for Costa Rica against Nigeria. In 2011, Madrigal was selected for the 2011 Copa América in Argentina.

== Personal life ==
When Madrigal played in Thailand, he frequently visited the beaches. He desires to conclude his career in Public Administration, which he began when he played at Universidad de Costa Rica.

== Career statistics ==
=== Club ===
As of 5 May 2015

Club performance			League		Cup		Continental		Total	
Season	Club	League	Apps	Goals	Apps	Goals	Apps	Goals	Apps	Goals
2008–09	CF UCR	Primera División de Costa Rica	19	3	-		-		19	3
2009–10	CF UCR	Primera División de Costa Rica	17	5	-		-		17	5
2010–11	Herediano	Primera División de Costa Rica	7	2	-		-		7	2
2011	Cerro Porteño	Paraguayan Primera División	5	0	-		2	0	7	0
2011–12	Herediano	Primera División de Costa Rica	12	0	-		3	0	15	0
2012–13	Deportivo Saprissa	Primera División de Costa Rica	18	3	-		-		18	3
2012–13	Santos de Guápiles	Primera División de Costa Rica	13	5	-		-		13	5
2013–14	Deportivo Saprissa	Primera División de Costa Rica	8	2	-		-		8	2
2013–14	Inter Baku	Azerbaijan Premier League	6	3	0	0	0	0	6	3
2014–15	Inter Baku	Azerbaijan Premier League	10	0	1	0	4	0	15	0
Total	Costa Rica		94	20	-		3	0	97	20
Total	Paraguay		5	0	-		2	0	7	0
Total	Azerbaijan		16	3	1	0	4	0	21	3
Career total			115	23	1	0	9	0	125	23

=== International ===
Costa Rica
Year	Apps	Goals
2010	4	1
2011	7	0
Total	11	1

Statistics accurate as of match played 27 February 2012

#	Date	Venue	Opponent	Score	Result	Competition
1.	26 January 2010	San Juan, Argentina	Argentina	2-2	3-2	Friendly
