= Revaz Tevdoradze =

Georgian footballer

Personal information
- Date of birth: 14 February 1988 (age 38)
- Place of birth: Tbilisi, Georgia
- Height: 1.91 m (6 ft 3 in)
- Position: Goalkeeper

Team information
- Current team: Dinamo Tbilisi (goalkeeping coach)

Youth career
- 2003–2004: FC Tbilisi
- 2004–2005: Metalurh Zaporizhya

Senior career*
Years	Team	Apps	(Gls)
2005–2006	FC Tbilisi	8	(0)
2006–2007	Dila Gori	11	(0)
2007–2008	Merani Tbilisi	20	(0)
2008–2010	Gagra	57	(0)
2010	Olimps	2	(0)
2011	Dinamo Batumi	0	(0)
2011–2012	Chikhura Sachkhere	18	(0)
2012–2013	Inter Baku	6	(0)
2013–2014	Chikhura Sachkhere	17	(0)
2014	Zugdidi	14	(0)
2015	Samtredia	13	(0)
2015	Torpedo Kutaisi	13	(0)
2016–2018	Locomotive Tbilisi	76	(0)
2019–2021	Merani Tbilisi	47	(0)
2021–2023	Locomotive Tbilisi	12	(0)
2023	Rustavi		

International career
2005–2009	Georgia U21	15	(0)
2006	Georgia (unofficial)	1	(0)

Managerial career
- 2025–: Dinamo Tbilisi (goalkeeping coach)
- * Club domestic league appearances and goals as of 11 April 2022

Revaz Tevdoradze (Georgian: რევაზ თევდორაძე, born 14 February 1988) is a former Georgian professional football player.
