= Robertinho (footballer, born 1988) =

Brazilian footballer

Personal information
- Full name: Roberto Soares Anghinetti
- Date of birth: June 13, 1988 (age 38)
- Place of birth: Belo Horizonte, Brazil
- Height: 1.72 m (5 ft 7 1/2 in)
- Position: Left winger

Team information
- Current team: Estrela do Norte
- Number: 11

Youth career
- 1995–2006: América Mineiro
- 2007–2008: Vila Nova

Senior career*
Years	Team	Apps	(Gls)
2008–2009	América Mineiro	2	(0)
2010–2013	Dinamo Tbilisi	72	(5)
2013	Inter Baku	1	(0)
2016–	Estrela do Norte	0	(0)
- * Club domestic league appearances and goals as of 28 January 2016

Roberto Soares Anghinetti (or simply Robertinho) (born June 13, 1988) is a Brazilian football player. He is a winger who plays for Estrela do Norte.

== Career statistics ==
Club	Season	League		Cup		Continental		Total	
Club	Season	Apps	Goals	Apps	Goals	Apps	Goals	Apps	Goals
Dinamo Tbilisi	2009-10	8	1	1	0	0	0	9	1
Dinamo Tbilisi	2010-11	25	1	0	0	5	1	31	2
Dinamo Tbilisi	2011-12	25	2	1	0	5	3	24	4
Dinamo Tbilisi	2012-13	14	1	1	1	0	0	15	2
Dinamo Tbilisi	Total	72	5	3	1	10	4	85	10
Inter Baku	2012-13	1	0	1	0	0	0	2	0
Inter Baku	Total	1	0	1	0	0	0	2	0
Career Total		73	5	4	1	10	4	87	10

Last edit: March 3, 2013
