= Ilia Kandelaki =

Georgian footballer

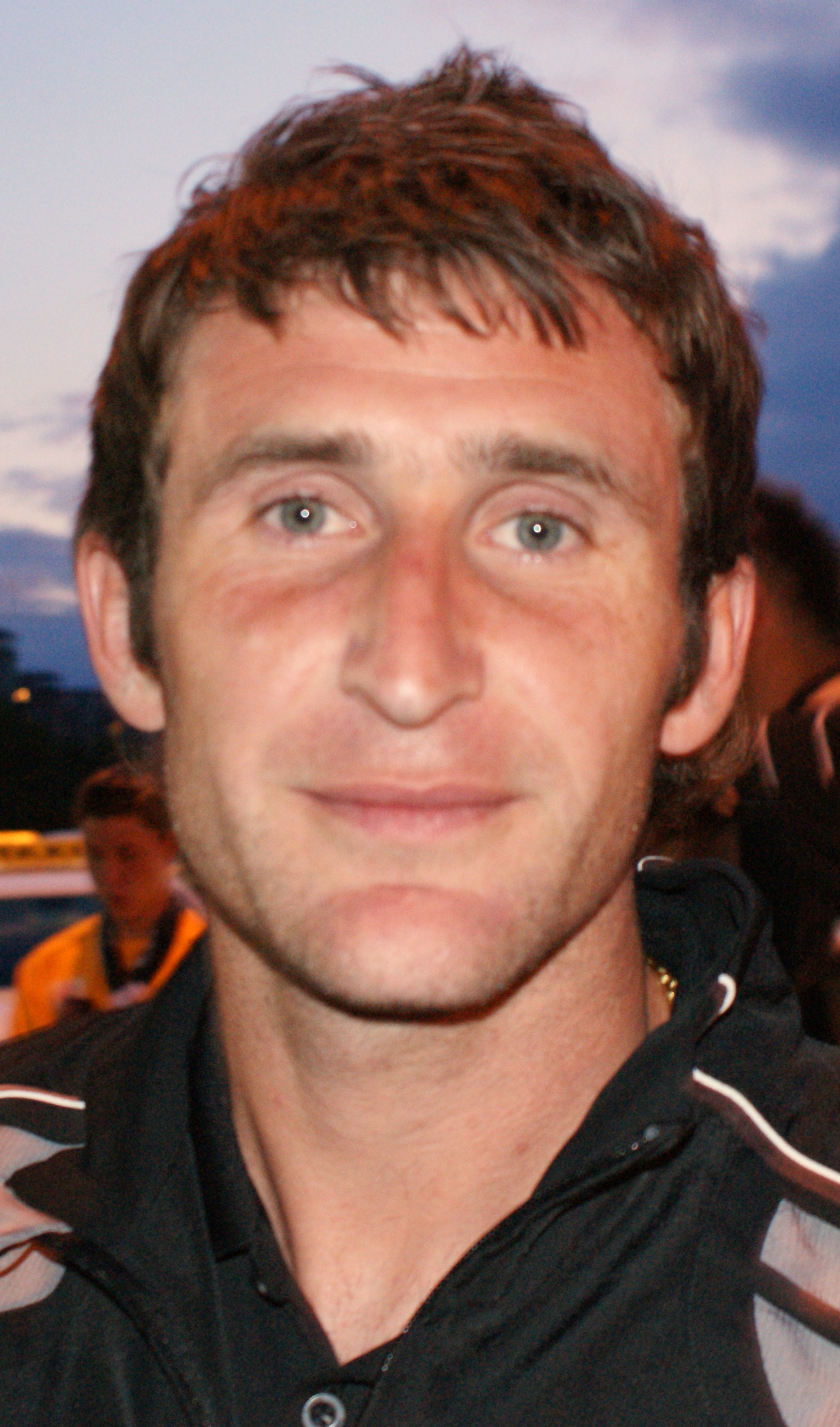

Personal information
- Full name: Ilia Kandelaki
- Date of birth: 26 December 1981 (age 44)
- Place of birth: Tbilisi, Soviet Union
- Height: 1.81 m (5 ft 11 1/2 in)
- Position: Defender

Senior career*
Years	Team	Apps	(Gls)
2000–2005	Dinamo Tbilisi	128	(1)
2005–2007	Chornomorets Odesa	39	(0)
2007–2008	Carl Zeiss Jena	20	(0)
2008–2010	Sturm Graz	60	(1)
2010–2013	Inter Baku	75	(3)
2013–2014	Zestaponi	12	(0)
2014–2015	Sioni Bolnisi	19	(0)

International career
2001–2003	Georgia U21	12	(0)
2004–2010	Georgia	14	(0)
- * Club domestic league appearances and goals

Ilia Kandelaki (Georgian: ილია კანდელაკი; born 26 December 1981) is a retired Georgian footballer of Caucasus Greek descent who last played for Sioni Bolnisi.

Kandelaki made his professional debut for Dinamo Tbilisi in 2000. He played at clubs in Ukraine, Germany, Austria and Azerbaijan during a 15-year career, and won 14 caps for Georgia between 2004 and 2010.

== Honours ==
Dinamo Tbilisi

- Erovnuli Liga: 2002–03, 2004–05
- Georgian Cup: 2002–03, 2003–04

Sturm Graz

- Austrian Cup: 2009–10
