= Fuad Bayramov (footballer, born 1994) =

Azerbaijani footballer (born 1994)

Personal information
- Full name: Fuad Hasan oglu Bayramov
- Date of birth: 30 November 1994 (age 31)
- Place of birth: Barda, Azerbaijan
- Height: 1.80 m (5 ft 11 in)
- Position: Midfielder

Senior career*
Years	Team	Apps	(Gls)
2012–2018	Keşla	100	(4)
2019	Rustavi	6	(1)
2021	KSZO Ostrowiec Świętokrzyski	11	(4)

International career
2010	Azerbaijan U17	2	(0)
2011	Azerbaijan U18	1	(0)
2011–2012	Azerbaijan U19	4	(0)
2015	Azerbaijan U21	2	(0)
- * Club domestic league appearances and goals as of 26 January 2022

Fuad Bayramov (born 30 November 1994) is an Azerbaijani professional footballer who plays as a midfielder.

== Club career ==
On 19 August 2012, Bayramov made his Azerbaijan Premier League debut for Keşla in a match against Khazar Lankaran.

== Honours ==
Keşla

- Azerbaijan Cup: 2017–18

KSZO Ostrowiec Świętokrzyski

- Polish Cup (Świętokrzyskie regionals): 2020–21
