= Bruce Abdoulaye =

Congolese footballer (born 1982)

Personal information
- Full name: Bruce Abdoulaye
- Date of birth: April 15, 1982 (age 44)
- Place of birth: Château-Thierry, France
- Height: 1.83 m (6 ft 0 in)
- Position: Right-back

Team information
- Current team: US Torcy (U19 manager)

Youth career
- 2001–2002: Vaires-sur-Marne

Senior career*
Years	Team	Apps	(Gls)
2002–2004	Grenoble	6	(0)
2004–2005	Lausanne Sports	2	(0)
2005–2006	Sénart-Moissy	13	(0)
2006–2011	Clermont	114	(1)
2011–2012	Metz	22	(0)
2012–2014	Inter Baku	60	(2)
2014–2015	Orléans	30	(0)
2015–2016	Grenoble	30	(0)
2016–2017	Bourg-Péronnas	22	(0)

International career
2006–2012	Congo	22	(1)

Managerial career
- 2015–2016: Grenoble (U19)
- 2017–2018: Louhans-Cuiseaux
- 2018: Villefranche B
- 2018–2019: Bourg Sud (U13)
- 2019: Central African Republic
- 2020: Tarbes Pyrénées
- 2020–2021: Umm Salal
- 2021–: US Torcy (U19)
- * Club domestic league appearances and goals

Bruce Abdoulaye (born April 15, 1982) is a football coach and former player. He is currently in charge of US Torcy's U19 team. Born in France, he represented Congo at international level.

== Club career ==
Abdoulaye spent most of his playing career in the French Ligue 1 and 2. He signed for Clermont Foot in 2006 and played in 114 competitive games.

In the summer of 2012, Abdoulaye joined Azerbaijan Premier League side Inter Baku. Abdoulaye rejected a new contract from Inter Baku in June 2014, returning to France to sign with US Orléans.

Abdoulaye is a dominant right back, known for his ruthless approach and rash tackling. In the recent game in the Europa League against IFK Mariehamn Abdoulaye was responsible for severely injuring two opposing players.

== International career ==
Abdoulaye made his debut for the Republic of the Congo in 2006.

== Coaching & management career ==
While playing for Grenoble Foot 38 in 2015 and 2016, Abdoulaye also coached the club's U19 squad. In the summer of 2017, he was appointed manager and sporting director of Louhans-Cuiseaux FC.

On 2 August 2018, Abdoulaye was appointed manager of FC Villefranche's B-team in the Regional 2. However, a few days later, the club confirmed that he had left the club again. At the end of the same month, he joined Bourg Sud as responsible for the technical area and U13 manager. In January 2019, Abdoulaye also launched a new academy, Pôle Performance Academy, for both girls and boys between 9 and 17 years old, for individual and collective improvement courses.

In May 2019, Abdoulaye announced he was the new manager of the Central African Republic national team, a claim which was denied by the country's football association. Later that month, it was confirmed that he had been appointed manager for the Central African Republic national team. He left the position in September 2019 when François Zahoui was hired as the new manager.

On 18 May 2020, he was appointed manager of Regional 2 side Tarbes Pyrénées. However, he left the position in September 2020 after accepting an offer from Umm Salal SC, where he was presented as the club's new manager. In the summer of 2021, he took charge of US Torcy's U19s.

== Career statistics ==
As of match played 19 March 2016

Club statistics
Season	Club	League	League		Cup		League Cup		Europe		Total	
Season	Club	League	App	Goals	App	Goals	App	Goals	App	Goals	App	Goals
2005–06	Sénart-Moissy	Championnat de France amateur	13	1					—		13	1
2005–06	Clermont Foot	Ligue 2	17	0					—		17	0
2006–07	Clermont Foot	Championnat National	34	0			2	0	—		36	0
2007–08	Clermont Foot	Ligue 2	30	1	1	0	3	0	—		34	1
2008–09	Clermont Foot	Ligue 2	27	0	2	0	0	0	—		29	0
2009–10	Clermont Foot	Ligue 2	19	0	1	0	4	0	—		24	0
2010–11	Clermont Foot	Ligue 2	31	0	2	0	2	0	—		35	0
2011–12	FC Metz	Ligue 2	22	0	1	0	1	0	—		24	0
2011–12	Metz Reserves	Championnat de France amateur	2	0	0	0	0	0	—		2	0
2012–13	Inter Baku	Azerbaijan Premier League	29	0	2	0	—		4	0	35	0
2013–14	Inter Baku	Azerbaijan Premier League	31	2	3	0	—		4	0	38	2
2014–15	US Orléans	Ligue 2	30	0	1	0	2	0	—		33	0
2015–16	Grenoble Foot 38	CFA	22	0	1	0	—		—		23	0
Total	France		247	2	9	0	14	0	—		269	2
Total	Azerbaijan		60	2	5	0	—		8	0	73	2
Career total			307	4	14	0	14	0	8	0	342	4

=== International goals ===
Scores and results list Congo's tally first.

No	Date	Venue	Opponent	Score	Result	Competition
1.	8 October 2006	Stade Alphonse Massemba-Débat, Brazzaville, Congo	Chad	1–0	3–1	2008 Africa Cup of Nations qualification
