= 2011–12 Sumgayit FK season =

Sumgayit
2011–12 season
- Manager: Bernhard Raab (from 9 September 2011)
- Stadium: Mehdi Huseynzade Stadium
- Premier League: 12th
- Azerbaijan Cup: First Round vs Qarabağ
- Top goalscorer: League: Orkhan Aliyev (5); All: Two Players (5)

The Sumgayit FK 2011–12 season was Sumgayit's first Azerbaijan Premier League season, and second season in their history. The finished the season in 12th place, bottom of the Premier League, and reached they First Round of the Azerbaijan Cup where they were defeated by Qarabağ.

== Squad ==
As of match played 11 May 2012

No.	Name	Nationality	Position	Date of birth (age)	Signed from	Signed in	Contract ends	Apps.	Goals
Goalkeepers
1	Emil Balayev	(Azerbaijan)	GK	17 April 1994 (aged 18)	loan from Neftchi Baku	2011	2012	0	0
12	Sahil Karimov	(Azerbaijan)	GK	22 January 1979 (aged 33)	Qarabağ	2011		6	0
55	Andrey Popovich	(Azerbaijan)	GK	19 March 1993 (aged 19)	FC Baku	2011		29	0
Defenders
2	Slavik Alkhasov	(Azerbaijan)	DF	6 February 1993 (aged 19)	loan from Neftchi Baku	2011	2012	22	0
3	Tarlan Guliyev	(Azerbaijan)	DF	19 April 1992 (aged 20)	loan from Neftchi Baku	2012	2012	10	0
4	Samir Abbasov	(Azerbaijan)	DF	1 February 1978 (aged 34)	Qarabağ	2011		28	3
16	Haji Ahmadov	(Azerbaijan)	DF	23 November 1993 (aged 18)	loan from FC Baku	2011	2012	22	0
20	Timur Israfilov	(Azerbaijan)	DF	25 June 1988 (aged 23)		2011		20	1
22	Ruslan Tagizade	(Azerbaijan)	DF	9 December 1993 (aged 18)	loan from Neftchi Baku	2011	2012	30	0
52	Badavi Huseynov	(Azerbaijan)	DF	11 July 1991 (aged 20)	loan from Anzhi Makhachkala	2011	2012	28	0
	Bakhtiyar Hasanalizade	(Azerbaijan)	DF	29 December 1992 (aged 19)	Trainee	2011		3	0
Midfielders
7	Mahmud Qurbanov	(Azerbaijan)	MF	10 May 1973 (aged 39)	FC Baku	2011		17	0
8	Emin Mustafayev	(Azerbaijan)	MF	2 January 1990 (aged 22)	MOIK Baku	2011		26	2
10	Eshgin Guliyev	(Azerbaijan)	MF	11 December 1990 (aged 21)	loan from Neftchi Baku	2011	2012	19	2
11	Kamil Nurahmadov	(Azerbaijan)	MF	10 June 1991 (aged 20)	loan from Neftchi Baku	2011	2012	34	5
19	Orkhan Aliyev	(Azerbaijan)	MF	21 December 1995 (aged 16)	Trainee	2011		20	5
70	Shamil Jamaladdinov	(Azerbaijan)	MF	1 May 1995 (aged 17)	Trainee	2011		5	0
76	Uğur Pamuk	(Azerbaijan)	MF	1 May 1995 (aged 17)	TuS Dornberg	2012		14	2
77	Samir Yusifov	(Azerbaijan)	MF	11 February 1994 (aged 18)		2011		3	0
95	Ruslan Nasirli	(Azerbaijan)	MF	12 October 1995 (aged 16)	Trainee	2011		4	0
	Abdulla Abatsiyev	(Russia)	MF	16 August 1993 (aged 18)		2011		18	0
	Murad Agayev	(Azerbaijan)	MF	9 February 1993 (aged 19)		2012		5	0
	Ramil Häşimzadä	(Azerbaijan)	MF	26 March 1991 (aged 21)	Trainee	2011		22	0
	Agil Mammadov	(Azerbaijan)	MF	12 April 1972 (aged 40)	Standard Sumgayit	2010			
Forwards
9	Orkhan Hasanov	(Azerbaijan)	FW	18 December 1991 (aged 20)	loan from Neftchi Baku	2011		18	1
21	Murad Sattarly	(Azerbaijan)	FW	9 May 1992 (aged 20)	loan from Qarabağ	2011		13	1
50	Samir Abdulov	(Azerbaijan)	FW	8 May 1987 (aged 25)	Kapaz	2012		10	1
90	Yasin Abbasov	(Azerbaijan)	FW	15 September 1988 (aged 23)	Turan-Tovuz	2012		6	1
91	Ruslan Gurbanov	(Azerbaijan)	FW	12 September 1991 (aged 20)	loan from Neftchi Baku	2011		16	2
Left during the season
5	Ramil Nuriyev	(Azerbaijan)	DF	10 August 1989 (aged 22)		2011		2	0
15	Aleksandr Gross	(Azerbaijan)	MF	6 May 1993 (aged 19)	Inter Baku	2011		5	0
25	Rashad Karimov	(Azerbaijan)	MF	2 April 1986 (aged 26)	Qarabağ	2011		2	0
90	Eldar Mammadov	(Azerbaijan)	FW	5 January 1990 (aged 22)		2011		13	2

== Transfers ==
=== In ===
Date	Position	Nationality	Name	From	Fee	Ref.
Summer 2011	GK	(Azerbaijan)	Sahil Karimov	Qarabağ		
Summer 2011	GK	(Azerbaijan)	Andrey Popovich	FC Baku		
Summer 2011	DF	(Azerbaijan)	Samir Abbasov	Qarabağ		
Summer 2011	MF	(Azerbaijan)	Rashad Karimov	Qarabağ		
Summer 2011	MF	(Azerbaijan)	Mahmud Qurbanov	FC Baku		
Summer 2011	MF	(Azerbaijan)	Emin Mustafayev	MOIK Baku		
Summer 2011	MF	(Azerbaijan)	Aleksandr Gross	Inter Baku		
January 2012	MF	(Azerbaijan)	Uğur Pamuk	TuS Dornberg		
January 2012	FW	(Azerbaijan)	Samir Abdulov	Kapaz		
January 2012	FW	(Azerbaijan)	Yasin Abbasov	Turan-Tovuz		

=== Loans in ===
Date from	Position	Nationality	Name	From	Date to	Ref.
Summer 2011	GK	(Azerbaijan)	Emil Balayev	Neftchi Baku	End of Season	
Summer 2011	DF	(Azerbaijan)	Slavik Alkhasov	Neftchi Baku	End of Season	
Summer 2011	DF	(Azerbaijan)	Tarlan Guliyev	Neftchi Baku	End of Season	
Summer 2011	DF	(Azerbaijan)	Haji Ahmadov	FC Baku	End of Season	
Summer 2011	DF	(Azerbaijan)	Ruslan Tagizade	Neftchi Baku	End of Season	
Summer 2011	DF	(Azerbaijan)	Badavi Huseynov	Anzhi Makhachkala	End of Season	
Summer 2011	MF	(Azerbaijan)	Eshgin Guliyev	Neftchi Baku	End of Season	
Summer 2011	MF	(Azerbaijan)	Kamil Nurahmadov	Neftchi Baku	End of Season	
Summer 2011	FW	(Azerbaijan)	Orkhan Hasanov	Neftchi Baku	End of Season	
Summer 2011	FW	(Azerbaijan)	Ruslan Gurbanov	Neftchi Baku	End of Season	
Summer 2011	FW	(Azerbaijan)	Murad Sattarly	Qarabağ	End of Season	

=== Released ===
Date	Position	Nationality	Name	Joined	Date
	MF	(Azerbaijan)	Rashad Karimov	Retired	
	DF	(Azerbaijan)	Ramil Nuriyev	Ravan Baku	
	MF	(Azerbaijan)	Aleksandr Gross		
	FW	(Azerbaijan)	Eldar Mammadov		

== Competitions ==
=== Premier League ===
==== Regular Stage ====
===== Results summary =====
Overall								Home						Away					
Pld	W	D	L	GF	GA	GD	Pts	W	D	L	GF	GA	GD	W	D	L	GF	GA	GD
22	4	3	15	16	37	−21	15	3	1	7	8	15	−7	1	2	8	8	22	−14

Last updated: 7 March 2012.
Source: See Results

===== Results =====
6 August 2011 1	Khazar Lankaran	2–1	Sumgayit	Lankaran
20:00 AZST (UTC+5)	Opara 33'; Wobay 42'	Report	E.Guliyev 84'	Stadium: Khazar Lankaran Central Stadium; Attendance: 8,000; Referee: Rahim Hasanov

14 August 2011 2	Sumgayit	1–2	Gabala	Sumqayit
18:00 AZST (UTC+5)	O.Aliyev 90'	Report	Dodô 5' (yellow card) 81'; Hüseynov (yellow card) 28'; Cruz 43'	Stadium: Mehdi Huseynzade Stadium; Attendance: 8,000; Referee: Anar Salmanov

21 August 2011 3	Neftchi Baku	4–0	Sumgayit	Baku
21:00 AZST (UTC+5)	Flavinho 20'; R Abdullayev 25'; Nasimov 42', 59'; Imamverdiyev (yellow card) 84'	Report	Ahmadov (yellow card) 71'	Stadium: Tofiq Bahramov Republican Stadium; Attendance: 400; Referee: Rauf Jabbarov

11 September 2011 5	Sumgayit	0–0	Qarabağ	Sumqayit
17:00 AZST (UTC+5)	R.Tagizade (yellow card) 81'	Report		Stadium: Mehdi Huseynzade Stadium; Attendance: 5,000; Referee: Jeyhun Haşımov

14 September 2011 4	Sumgayit	0–2	Inter Baku	Sumqayit
17:00 AZST (UTC+5)		Report	Červenka (yellow card) 32'; Kandelaki (yellow card) 38'; Dashdemirov 71'; Zargarov 90+2'	Stadium: Mehdi Huseynzade Stadium; Attendance: 2,000; Referee: Elnur Muradov

18 September 2011 6	Ravan Baku	0–0	Sumgayit	Baku
17:00 AZST (UTC+5)	M.Zečević (penalty missed) 55'; G.Gulordava (yellow card) 73'	Report	S.Alkhasov (yellow card) 45'; Popovich (yellow card) 54'	Stadium: Dalga Arena; Attendance: 300; Referee: Aliyev Ağayev

24 September 2011 7	Sumgayit	0–1	Simurq	Sumqayit
15:00 AZST (UTC+5)	K.Nurahmadov (yellow card) 40'; E.Mammadov (yellow card) 90'	Report	Poškus 10'; A.Bagirov (yellow card) 90'; A.Hodžić (yellow card) 90+5'	Stadium: Mehdi Huseynzade Stadium; Attendance: 500; Referee: Vusal Aliyev

30 September 2011 8	Kapaz	1–1	Sumgayit	Ganja
16:00 AZST (UTC+5)	J.Mirzaev (yellow card) 25'; Sultanov 58'; Junivan (yellow card) 80'; S.Karimov (yellow card) 85'	Report	E.Mammadov 33'; S.Alkhasov (yellow card) 36'; Popovich (yellow card) 53'	Stadium: Ganja City Stadium; Attendance: 5,000; Referee: Rauf Jabbarov

16 October 2011 9	Sumgayit	0–1	FC Baku	Sumqayit
15:00 AZST (UTC+5)	Popovich (red card) 18'; R.Häşimzadä (yellow card) 33'; K.Nurahmadov (yellow card) 88'	Report	Verpakovskis 46'	Stadium: Mehdi Huseynzade Stadium; Attendance: 2,000; Referee: Anar Salmanov

23 October 2011 10	Turan-Tovuz	1–0	Sumgayit	Tovuz
15:00 AZST (UTC+5)	Artiukh 30' (pen.); Z.Dzamsashvili (yellow card) 63'; A.Taghiyev (yellow card) 65'; M.Muslumzade (yellow card) 71'; H.Aliyev (yellow card) 77'	Report	Gurbanov (yellow card) 45+1'; R.Tagizade (yellow card) 75'	Stadium: Tovuz City Stadium; Attendance: 3,000; Referee: Vusal Aliyev

30 October 2011 11	Sumgayit	2–1	AZAL	Sumqayit
14:00 AZT (UTC+4)	S.Abdulov 5'; E.Mammadov 33'; R.Tağızadə (yellow card) 85'; Popovich (yellow card) 90+3'	Report	Schutz (yellow card) 12' (goal) 70'; Bulku (yellow card) 16'; Z.Benouahi (yellow card) 58'	Stadium: Mehdi Huseynzade Stadium; Attendance: 500; Referee: Rauf Jabbarov

5 November 2011 12	Qarabağ	1–2	Sumgayit	Quzanlı
14:00 AZT (UTC+4)	Léo Rocha (yellow card) 68' (goal) 90+1'; Agolli (yellow card) 90+2'	Report	K.Nurahmadov 20'; E.Mustafayev (yellow card) 29'; Abbasov (yellow card) 41'; M.Sattarly (yellow card) 72'	Stadium: Guzanli Olympic Complex Stadium; Attendance: 4,000; Referee: Rahim Hasanov

19 November 2011 13	Simurq	1–0	Sumgayit	Zaqatala
16:00 AZT (UTC+4)	A.Shemonayev (yellow card) 40'; Poškus 80'	Report	T.Israfilov (yellow card) 76'	Stadium: Zaqatala City Stadium; Attendance: 1,000; Referee: Anar Salmanov

25 November 2011 14	Sumgayit	0–1	Ravan Baku	Sumqayit
14:00 AZT (UTC+4)	E.Mustafayev (yellow card) 42'; Popovich (yellow card) 45'; Abatsiyev (yellow card) 82'	Report	Suma 18'; Akhundov (yellow card) 51'; H.Iskanderov (yellow card) 58'; Shalbuzov (yellow card) 90'	Stadium: Mehdi Huseynzade Stadium; Attendance: 150; Referee: Vusal Aliyev

4 December 2011 15	Gabala	3–1	Sumgayit	Qabala
14:00 AZT (UTC+4)	Djiehoua 36'; Yunisoglu (yellow card) 62'; Dodô 70' (yellow card) 71'; Mendy 85'; Chertoganov (yellow card) 90+2'	Report	Abbasov 39'	Stadium: Gabala City Stadium; Attendance: 1,000; Referee: Rahim Hasanov

11 December 2011 16	Sumgayit	4–1	Kapaz	Sumqayit
14:00 AZT (UTC+4)	K.Nurahmadov 45', 88' (pen.); T.Israfilov 51'; E.Mustafayev 77'; Qurbanov (yellow card) 80'	Report	S.Allahguliyev 15'; Feutchine (yellow card) 78'; Junivan (yellow card) 82'; A.Mammadov (yellow card) 87'	Stadium: Mehdi Huseynzade Stadium; Attendance: 480; Referee: Anar Salmanov

15 December 2011 17	Baku	1–0	Sumgayit	Baku
14:00 AZT (UTC+4)	Verpakovskis 54'; N.Mammadov (yellow card) 77'	Report	T.Israfilov (yellow card) 53'; K.Nurahmadov (yellow card) 90+1'	Stadium: Tofiq Bahramov Republican Stadium; Attendance: 400; Referee: Vusal Aliyev

20 December 2011 18	Sumgayit	1–0	Turan-Tovuz	Sumqayit
14:00 AZT (UTC+4)	Abatsiyev (yellow card) 51'; R.Häşimzadä (yellow card) 60'; Abbasov 70'	Report	M.Muslumzade (yellow card) 26' (yellow-red card) 68'; Z.Dzamsashvili (yellow card) 54'; S.Tagiyev (yellow card) 63'	Stadium: Mehdi Huseynzade Stadium; Attendance: 500; Referee: Rovshan Ahmadov

15 February 2012 20	Sumgayit	0–3	Neftchi Baku	Baku
14:00 AZT (UTC+4)		Report	Flavinho 45'; Nasimov 49', 85'	Stadium: Shafa Stadium; Attendance: 500; Referee: Anar Salmanov

20 February 2012 21	Inter Baku	2–0	Sumgayit	Baku
14:00 AZT (UTC+4)	Tskhadadze 34'; Dashdemirov (red card) 35'; S.Zargarov (yellow card) 56'; Levin 65'; Mammadov (yellow card) 77'; Hajiyev (yellow card) 86'	Report	R.Häşimzadä (yellow card) 35'; Abatsiyev (yellow card) 45+1'	Stadium: Shafa Stadium; Attendance: 300; Referee: Elchin Mämmädov

3 March 2012 22	Sumgayit	0–3	Khazar Lankaran	Sumqayit
14:00 AZT (UTC+4)	T.Israfilov (yellow card) 31'; Abatsiyev (yellow card) 45+1'; R.Tagizade (yellow card) 54'; R.Häşimzadä (yellow card) 59'	Report	Todorov (yellow card) 22'; Bonfim 27' (yellow card) 90+2'; Mureşan 40' (yellow card) 81'; Doman (yellow card) 60' (goal) 68'	Stadium: Mehdi Huseynzade Stadium; Attendance: 1,000; Referee: Aliyar Ağayev

7 March 2012 19	AZAL	6–3	Sumgayit	Baku
14:00 AZT (UTC+4)	B.Arsenijević (yellow card) 13' (goal) 55'; T.Narimanov (yellow card) 18'; Schutz 30', 71'; Z.Benouahi 33', 53'; T.Khalilov 72'; M.Daunoravičius (yellow card) 77'	Report	O.Hasanov (yellow card) 1'; M.Sattarly (yellow card) 27'; E.Guliyev (yellow card) 36'; O.Aliyev 54'; Pamuk 76'; E.Mustafayev 78' (pen.); Guliyev (yellow card) 84'	Stadium: AZAL Stadium; Attendance: 300; Referee: Elvin Askerov

===== League table =====
Pos	Team	Pld	W	D	L	GF	GA	GD	Pts	Qualification
8	Ravan Baku	22	6	7	9	23	29	−6	25	Qualification for relegation group
9	Kapaz	22	6	4	12	26	38	−12	22	Qualification for relegation group
10	Simurq	22	5	4	13	18	34	−16	19	Qualification for relegation group
11	Sumgayit	22	4	3	15	16	37	−21	15	Qualification for relegation group
12	Turan	22	3	2	17	13	33	−20	11	Qualification for relegation group

Source: Soccerway: Azerbaijan Premier League Table
Rules for classification: 1) points; 2) goal difference; 3) number of goals scored.

==== Relegation Group ====
===== Results summary =====
Overall								Home						Away					
Pld	W	D	L	GF	GA	GD	Pts	W	D	L	GF	GA	GD	W	D	L	GF	GA	GD
10	2	3	5	11	15	−4	9	2	1	2	5	4	+1	0	2	3	6	11	−5

Last updated: 11 May 2012.
Source: See Results

===== Results =====
11 March 2012 23	Sumgayit	0–1	Ravan Baku	Sumqayit
14:00 AZT (UTC+4)	Huseynov (yellow card) 61'; E.Mustafayev (penalty missed) 66'	Report	Suma (yellow card) 24'; M.Zečević (penalty missed) 38' 90'	Stadium: Mehdi Huseynzade Stadium; Attendance: 100; Referee: Rauf Jabbarov

18 March 2012 24	Kapaz	4–1	Sumgayit	Ganja
14:00 AZT (UTC+4)	Fomenko 2', 24'; Huseynov 17' (o.g.); Svezhintsev (yellow card) 26'; S.Karimov (yellow card) 28'; N.Mammadov (yellow card) 78'; Junivan 85' (pen.); R.Sultanov (yellow card) 87'	Report	Abbasov 48'; R.Häşimzadä (yellow card) 78'	Stadium: Ganja City Stadium; Attendance: 5,000; Referee: Vusal Äliyev

25 March 2012 25	Sumgayit	1–2	Simurq	Sumqayit
14:00 AZT (UTC+4)	Abbasov (yellow card) 38'; Y.Abbasov (yellow card) 58' (goal) 90+2'; R.Häşimzadä (yellow card) 85'	Report	Genov 4'; Tarasovs (yellow card) 32'; Doroș 52'; Alunderis (yellow card) 90+1'	Stadium: Mehdi Huseynzade Stadium; Attendance: 600; Referee: Rauf Jabbarov

1 April 2012 26	Sumgayit	1–1	Turan-Tovuz	Sumqayit
14:00 AZST (UTC+5)	K.Nurahmadov 28'; O.Aliyev (yellow card) 46'; Pamuk (yellow card) 80'	Report	G.Beriashvili 45+2'; A.Abbasov (yellow card) 46'; Taghiyev (yellow card) 70'	Stadium: Mehdi Huseynzade Stadium; Attendance: 500; Referee: Vusal Äliyev

8 April 2012 27	AZAL	1–1	Sumgayit	Baku
17:00 AZST (UTC+5)	Nabiyev (yellow card) 40' (yellow-red card) 79'; Igbekoyi (yellow card) 55' (red card) 55'; Rahimov (yellow card) 83'; Bulku 87'	Report	T.Guliyev (yellow card) 15' (yellow-red card) 74'; E.Guliyev 54' (pen.)	Stadium: AZAL Arena; Attendance: 200; Referee: Rahim Hasanov

15 April 2012 28	Sumgayit	2–0	Kapaz	Sumqayit
15:00 AZST (UTC+5)	Abatsiyev (yellow card) 22'; Gurbanov 42', 74'; Agayev (yellow card) 78'	Report	Fomenko (yellow card) 22'; R.Sultanov (yellow card) 69'	Stadium: Mehdi Huseynzade Stadium; Attendance: 200; Referee: Elchin Mämmädov

21 April 2012 29	Simurq	2–1	Sumgayit	Zaqatala
18:00 AZST (UTC+5)	Poladov 35'; Genov (yellow card) 62'; Doroș 67'	Report	O.Hasanov (yellow card) 26'; Abbasov (yellow card) 45'; Gurbanov (yellow card) 51'; E.Guliyev (red card) 54'; Pamuk (yellow card) 63'; Agayev (yellow card) 72'; O.Aliyev 78'	Stadium: Zaqatala City Stadium; Attendance: 1,200; Referee: Rahim Häsänov

28 April 2012 30	Turan-Tovuz	1–1	Sumgayit	Tovuz
16:00 AZST (UTC+5)	F.Aliyev (yellow card) 43'; Gogoberishvili 69' (pen.) (yellow card) 70'; S.Tagiyev (yellow card) 76'	Report	S.Jamaladdinov (yellow card) 52'; O.Aliyev 59'; Gurbanov (yellow card) 70'	Stadium: Tovuz City Stadium; Attendance: 1,000; Referee: Elchin Mämmädov

6 May 2012 31	Sumgayit	1–0	AZAL	Sumqayit
17:30 AZST (UTC+5)	Abatsiyev (yellow card) 29'; O.Hasanov 83' (yellow card) 87'; R.Tagizade (yellow card) 87'	Report	Bulku (yellow card) 41'; Rahimov (yellow card) 58'; Z.Benouahi (yellow card) 87'	Stadium: Mehdi Huseynzade Stadium; Attendance: 135; Referee: Rauf Jabbarov

11 May 2012 32	Ravan Baku	3–2	Sumgayit	Baku
17:30 AZST (UTC+5)	T.Novruzov 32', 35'; Vidaković 53' (yellow card) 53'; E.Hodžić (yellow card) 61'	Report	Pamuk 10' (yellow card) 56'; O.Aliyev 26'; Abbasov (yellow card) 35'; Agayev (yellow card) 53'	Stadium: Dalga Arena; Attendance: 2,000; Referee: Aliyar Ağayev

===== League table =====
Pos	Team	Pld	W	D	L	GF	GA	GD	Pts	Qualification or relegation
7	AZAL	32	12	8	12	44	44	0	44	
8	Ravan Baku	32	10	11	11	39	39	0	41	
9	Simurq	32	8	10	14	27	41	−14	34	
10	Kapaz	32	9	5	18	35	55	−20	32	
11	Turan (R)	32	6	7	19	26	42	−16	25	Qualification for relegation playoffs
12	Sumgayit (R)	32	6	6	20	27	52	−25	24	Relegation to Azerbaijan First Division

Source: Soccerway.com
Rules for classification: 1) points; 2) goal difference; 3) number of goals scored.
(R) Relegated

=== Azerbaijan Cup ===
26 October 2011 Preliminary Round	Lokomotiv-Bilajary	0–2	Sumgayit	Baku
14:00 AZT (UTC+4)	A.İbrahimli (yellow card) 9'; V.Bəybalayev (yellow card) 74'	Report	Abatsiyev (yellow card) 10'; R.Häşimzadä (yellow card) 36'; S.Abdulov (yellow card) 55' (goal) 60'; R.Tağızadə (yellow card) 70'; Gurbanov (red card) 89'; K.Nurəhmədov 90'	Stadium: FK Baku Training Ground; Attendance: 150; Referee: Rahim Həsənov

30 November 2011 First Round	Qarabağ	3–0	Sumgayit	Quzanlı
13:00 AZT (UTC+4)	B.Soltanov 19'; Ismayilov 24'; Rocha 40'	Report	E.Guliyev (yellow card) 78'; E.Mustafayev (yellow card) 84'	Stadium: Guzanli Olympic Complex Stadium; Attendance: 1,500; Referee: Elchin Mämmädov

== Squad statistics ==
As of match played 11 May 2012

=== Appearances and goals ===
No.	Pos	Nat	Player	Total		Premier League		Azerbaijan Cup	
No.	Pos	Nat	Player	Apps	Goals	Apps	Goals	Apps	Goals
2	DF	(Azerbaijan) AZE	Slavik Alkhasov	22	0	16+4	0	2	0
3	DF	(Azerbaijan) AZE	Tarlan Guliyev	10	0	10	0	0	0
4	DF	(Azerbaijan) AZE	Samir Abbasov	28	3	28	3	0	0
7	MF	(Azerbaijan) AZE	Mahmud Qurbanov	17	0	12+5	0	0	0
8	MF	(Azerbaijan) AZE	Emin Mustafayev	26	2	19+5	2	2	0
9	FW	(Azerbaijan) AZE	Orkhan Hasanov	18	1	9+8	1	1	0
10	MF	(Azerbaijan) AZE	Eshgin Guliyev	19	2	13+5	2	1	0
11	MF	(Azerbaijan) AZE	Kamil Nurahmadov	34	5	24+8	4	1+1	1
12	GK	(Azerbaijan) AZE	Sahil Karimov	6	0	3+1	0	2	0
16	DF	(Azerbaijan) AZE	Haji Ahmadov	22	0	21	0	1	0
19	MF	(Azerbaijan) AZE	Orkhan Aliyev	20	5	16+4	5	0	0
20	DF	(Azerbaijan) AZE	Timur Israfilov	20	1	18+2	1	0	0
21	FW	(Azerbaijan) AZE	Murad Sattarly	13	1	6+6	1	1	0
22	DF	(Azerbaijan) AZE	Ruslan Tagizade	30	0	27+1	0	2	0
50	FW	(Azerbaijan) AZE	Samir Abdulov	11	2	3+7	1	0+1	1
52	DF	(Azerbaijan) AZE	Badavi Huseynov	28	0	26	0	2	0
55	GK	(Azerbaijan) AZE	Andrey Popovich	29	0	29	0	0	0
70	MF	(Azerbaijan) AZE	Shamil Jamaladdinov	5	0	1+3	0	0+1	0
76	MF	(Azerbaijan) AZE	Uğur Pamuk	14	2	10+4	2	0	0
77	MF	(Azerbaijan) AZE	Samir Yusifov	3	0	1	0	2	0
90	FW	(Azerbaijan) AZE	Yasin Abbasov	6	1	2+4	1	0	0
91	FW	(Azerbaijan) AZE	Ruslan Gurbanov	16	2	10+5	2	1	0
95	MF	(Azerbaijan) AZE	Ruslan Nasirli	4	0	4	0	0	0
	DF	(Azerbaijan) AZE	Bakhtiyar Hasanalizade	3	0	3	0	0	0
	MF	(Azerbaijan) AZE	Abdulla Abatsiyev	18	0	15+1	0	2	0
	MF	(Azerbaijan) AZE	Murad Agayev	5	0	5	0	0	0
	MF	(Azerbaijan) AZE	Ramil Häşimzadä	22	0	12+9	0	1	0
	MF	(Azerbaijan) AZE	Agil Mammadov	3	0	1+2	0	0	0
Players who left Sumgayit during the season:
5	DF	(Azerbaijan) AZE	Ramil Nuriyev	2	0	0+1	0	0+1	0
15	MF	(Azerbaijan) AZE	Aleksandr Gross	5	0	1+3	0	1	0
25	MF	(Azerbaijan) AZE	Rashad Karimov	2	0	2	0	0	0
90	FW	(Azerbaijan) AZE	Eldar Mammadov	13	2	9+3	2	0+1	0

=== Goal scorers ===
Place	Position	Nation	Number	Name	Premier League	Azerbaijan Cup	Total
1	MF	(Azerbaijan)	19	Orkhan Aliyev	5	0	5
1	MF	(Azerbaijan)	11	Kamil Nurahmadov	4	1	5
3	DF	(Azerbaijan)	4	Samir Abbasov	3	0	3
4	MF	(Azerbaijan)	10	Eshgin Guliyev	2	0	2
4	MF	(Azerbaijan)	8	Emin Mustafayev	2	0	2
4	FW	(Azerbaijan)	91	Ruslan Gurbanov	2	0	2
4	FW	(Azerbaijan)	90	Eldar Mammadov	2	0	2
4	MF	(Azerbaijan)	76	Uğur Pamuk	2	0	2
4	FW	(Azerbaijan)	50	Samir Abdulov	1	1	2
10	DF	(Azerbaijan)	20	Timur Israfilov	1	0	1
10	FW	(Azerbaijan)	9	Orkhan Hasanov	1	0	1
10	FW	(Azerbaijan)	21	Murad Sattarly	1	0	1
10	FW	(Azerbaijan)	90	Yasin Abbasov	1	0	1
				TOTALS	27	2	29

=== Disciplinary record ===
Number	Nation	Position	Name	Premier League		Azerbaijan Cup		Total	
Number	Nation	Position	Name	Booked	Sent off (straight red)	Booked	Sent off (straight red)	Booked	Sent off (straight red)
2	(Azerbaijan)	DF	Slavik Alkhasov	2	0	0	0	2	0
3	(Azerbaijan)	DF	Tarlan Guliyev	3	1	0	0	3	1
4	(Azerbaijan)	DF	Samir Abbasov	4	0	0	0	4	0
7	(Azerbaijan)	MF	Mahmud Qurbanov	1	0	0	0	1	0
8	(Azerbaijan)	MF	Emin Mustafayev	2	0	1	0	3	0
9	(Azerbaijan)	FW	Orkhan Hasanov	1	0	0	0	1	0
10	(Azerbaijan)	MF	Eshgin Guliyev	1	1	1	0	2	1
11	(Azerbaijan)	MF	Kamil Nurahmadov	1	0	0	0	1	0
16	(Azerbaijan)	DF	Haji Ahmadov	4	0	0	0	4	0
19	(Azerbaijan)	MF	Orkhan Aliyev	1	0	0	0	1	0
20	(Azerbaijan)	DF	Timur Israfilov	3	0	0	0	3	0
21	(Azerbaijan)	FW	Murad Sattarly	1	0	0	0	1	0
22	(Azerbaijan)	MF	Ruslan Tagizade	5	0	1	0	6	0
50	(Azerbaijan)	FW	Samir Abdulov	1	0	1	0	2	0
52	(Azerbaijan)	DF	Badavi Huseynov	1	0	0	0	1	0
55	(Azerbaijan)	GK	Andrey Popovich	4	1	0	0	4	1
70	(Azerbaijan)	MF	Shamil Jamaladdinov	1	0	0	0	1	0
76	(Azerbaijan)	MF	Uğur Pamuk	3	0	0	0	3	0
90	(Azerbaijan)	FW	Yasin Abbasov	1	0	0	0	1	0
91	(Azerbaijan)	FW	Ruslan Gurbanov	3	0	0	1	3	1
	(Azerbaijan)	MF	Abdulla Abatsiyev	6	0	1	0	7	0
	(Azerbaijan)	MF	Murad Agayev	1	0	0	0	1	0
	(Azerbaijan)	MF	Ramil Häşimzadä	6	0	1	0	7	0
Players who left Sumgayit during the season:
90	(Azerbaijan)	FW	Eldar Mammadov	1	0	0	0	1	0
			TOTALS	0	0	6	1	6	1
