= 2011–12 FC Kəpəz season =

Kəpəz
2011–12 season
- President: Tofig Zeynalov
- Manager: Mehman Allahverdiyev; Until 21 November 2011; Mirbaghir Isayev; 21 November-24 December 2011; Fuad Ismayilov; From 1 January 2012
- Stadium: Tovuz City Stadium
- Premier League: 10th
- Azerbaijan Cup: Quarterfinals vs Neftchi Baku
- Top goalscorer: League: Yuriy Fomenko (11); All: Yuriy Fomenko (13)
- Highest home attendance: 15,000 vs AZAL; 11 September 2011
- Lowest home attendance: 500 vs Bakili; 30 November 2011
- Average home league attendance: 5,439
Home colours	Away colours

The Kəpəz 2011–12 season was Kəpəz's second Azerbaijan Premier League season since their promotion back into the top flight. They finished the season in 10th place and were knocked out of the Azerbaijan Cup in the Quarterfinals by Neftchi Baku.

Kəpəz started the season under Mehman Allahverdiyev, who resigned 21 November 2011 and was replaced by Mirbaghir Isayev. Isayev himself resigned on 24 December 2011, being replaced by Fuad Ismayilov on 1 January 2012.

== Squad ==
As of 22 December 2011

Note: Flags indicate national team as defined under FIFA eligibility rules; some limited exceptions apply. Players may hold more than one non-FIFA nationality.

No.	Pos.	Nation	Player
1	GK	AZE	Khayal Zeynalov
2	DF	AZE	Nijat Mammadov
4	DF	AZE	Azer Mammadov (captain)
5	DF	AZE	Ali Ismayilov
6	MF	AZE	Vasif Aliyev
8	MF	CMR	Guy Feutchine
9	MF	AZE	Jeyhun Ahmadov
10	MF	AZE	Jeyhun Sultanov
11	FW	AZE	Sabir Allahguliyev
12	MF	EGY	Islam Emad
14	MF	BLR	Dmitri Parkhachev

No.	Pos.	Nation	Player
15	DF	AZE	Shahin Karimov
17	DF	AZE	Renat Sultanov
18	MF	RUS	Nikolai Svezhintsev
19	MF	AZE	Zaur Asadov
20	MF	AZE	Emin Aliyev
22	GK	AZE	Tural Abbaszade
23	FW	BRA	Junivan
25	DF	MDA	Ion Arabadji
27	MF	AZE	Parvin Pashayev
28	FW	UKR	Yuriy Fomenko
88	GK	AZE	Elshan Poladov

== Transfers ==
=== Summer ===
In: Note: Flags indicate national team as defined under FIFA eligibility rules; some limited exceptions apply. Players may hold more than one non-FIFA nationality.

No.	Pos.	Nation	Player
5	DF	TUR	Muammer Erdoğdu (from (Azerbaijan) Turan Tovuz)
6	MF	AZE	Vasif Aliyev (from (Azerbaijan) Simurq)
6	DF	SLE	Sidney Kargbo (from (Belgium) K.V. Red Star Waasland)
9	MF	AZE	Khayal Garayev (from (Azerbaijan) Turan Tovuz)
14	MF	BLR	Dmitri Parkhachev (from (Kazakhstan) Zhetysu)
18	MF	RUS	Nikolay Svezhentsev (from (Russia) Rusichi Oryol)
19	MF	AZE	Zaur Asadov (from (Azerbaijan) Mughan)
22	GK	RUS	Konstantin Kolesnikov (from (Russia) Olimpia Gelendzhik)
25	MF	UKR	Anton Hay (from (Belarus) Dnepr Mogilev)
30	FW	UKR	Yuriy Fomenko (from (Ukraine) FC Helios Kharkiv)
34	DF	AZE	Javad Mirzayev (from (Azerbaijan) Mughan)
88	GK	AZE	Elshan Poladov (from (Azerbaijan) AZAL)
—	DF	ROU	Răzvan Ţârlea (from (Azerbaijan) Gabala)
—	DF	SRB	Milan Antić (from (Azerbaijan) Gabala)

Out: Note: Flags indicate national team as defined under FIFA eligibility rules; some limited exceptions apply. Players may hold more than one non-FIFA nationality.

No.	Pos.	Nation	Player
1	GK	BIH	Edis Kurtanović
2	DF	AZE	Khayal Mustafayev (to (Azerbaijan) Inter Baku)
5	MF	AZE	Matlab Mammadov (released, joined (Azerbaijan) Taraggisummer 2012)
6	MF	AZE	Samir Zargarov (to (Azerbaijan) Inter Baku)
7	MF	AZE	Ramal Huseynov (to (Azerbaijan) Turan Tovuz)
9	MF	AZE	Samir Abdulov (to (Azerbaijan) Sumgayit City)
13	MF	GEO	Zura Dzamsashvili (to (Azerbaijan) Turan Tovuz)
14	MF	AZE	Asaf Qädiri (to (Azerbaijan) Turan Tovuz)
18	MF	AZE	Ibrahim Huseynov (released, joined (Azerbaijan) Taraggisummer 2012)
20	DF	UKR	Volodymyr Kozlenko
20	MF	AZE	Vusal Huseynov
22	GK	AZE	Ruslan Majidov
24	MF	SRB	Vladimir Zelenbaba
25	FW	LAT	Kristaps Grebis (to (Azerbaijan) Simurq)
27	MF	AZE	Ramazan Abbasov (to (Azerbaijan) Ravan Baku)
28	MF	CMR	Patrice Noukeu (to (Belgium) Deinze)

=== Winter ===
In: Note: Flags indicate national team as defined under FIFA eligibility rules; some limited exceptions apply. Players may hold more than one non-FIFA nationality.

No.	Pos.	Nation	Player
1	GK	AZE	Khayal Zeynalov (loan return from (Azerbaijan) Taraggi)
5	DF	AZE	Ali Ismailov (from (Azerbaijan) Taraggi)
7	MF	GEO	Giorgi Sepiashvili (from (Georgia (country)) Spartaki-Tskhinvali)
9	MF	AZE	Jeyhun Ahmadov (from (Azerbaijan) Taraggi)
14	MF	EGY	Islam Emad (from (Egypt) Ismaily)
22	GK	AZE	Tural Abbaszade (from (Azerbaijan) Simurq)
25	MF	MDA	Ivan Arabaçi (from (Moldova) Rapid Chişinău)
—	DF	AZE	Nail Mammadov (from (Azerbaijan) Taraggi)

Out: Note: Flags indicate national team as defined under FIFA eligibility rules; some limited exceptions apply. Players may hold more than one non-FIFA nationality.

No.	Pos.	Nation	Player
3	DF	AZE	Vasif Hagverdiyev
5	DF	TUR	Muammer Erdoğdu (to (Azerbaijan) Turan Tovuz)
6	MF	SLE	Sidney Kargbo
7	MF	AZE	Asef Gadiri (to (Azerbaijan) Turan Tovuz)
9	MF	AZE	Khayal Garaev (to (Azerbaijan) Turan Tovuz)
22	GK	RUS	Konstantin Kolesnikov (to (Russia) Olimpia Gelendzhik)
25	FW	UKR	Anton Hay
34	DF	AZE	Javad Mirzaev (to (Azerbaijan) Turan Tovuz)
—	GK	AZE	Känan Bayramov
—	DF	AZE	Mehman Mämmädov
—	DF	ROU	Răzvan Ţârlea
—	DF	SRB	Milan Antić (to (Albania) Tërbuni Pukë)

== Competitions ==
=== Azerbaijan Premier League ===
==== Results summary ====
Overall								Home						Away					
Pld	W	D	L	GF	GA	GD	Pts	W	D	L	GF	GA	GD	W	D	L	GF	GA	GD
22	6	4	12	26	38	−12	22	3	3	4	14	16	−2	3	1	8	12	22	−10

Last updated: 21 December 2011.
Source: Soccerway

==== Results by round ====
Round	1	2	3	4	5	6	7	8	9	10	11	12	13	14	15	16	17	18	19	20	21	22
Ground	H	A	H	A	H	A	A	H	A	H	A	H	A	H	A	A	H	A	H	A	H	H
Result	W	L	L	W	W	L	D	D	L	D	L	L	L	D	W	L	L	L	L	L	W	W
Position																				10	9	9

Source: Soccerway
A = Away; H = Home; W = Win; D = Draw; L = Loss

==== Results ====
6 August 2011 1	Kəpəz	3–2	Ravan Baku	Ganja City Stadium
18:00 AZST (UTC+5)	Junivan 37'; Sultanov 85', 88'	Summary	Zečević 77' (pen.); Pelu 37'	Attendance: 5,200; Referee: Rauf Jabbarov

14 August 2011 2	Turan Tovuz	3–1	Kəpəz	Tovuz City Stadium
18:00 AZST (UTC+5)	Dzamsashvili 24'; Artiukh 55' (pen.), 80'	Summary	Sultanov 5'	Attendance: 5,000; Referee: Vusal Aliyev

21 August 2011 3	Kəpəz	1–2	Qarabağ	Ganja City Stadium
17:00 AZST (UTC+5)	Parkhachev 49'	Summary	Adamia 8'; Aliyev 13'	Attendance: 10,000; Referee: Anar Salmanov

27 August 2011 4	Baku	0–3	Kəpəz	Tofig Bakhramov Stadium
18:00 AZST (UTC+5)	Kargbo (yellow card) 61' (yellow-red card) 81'	Summary	Allahguliyev 23'; Fomenko 27', 40'	Attendance: 300; Referee: Elchin Mämmädov

4 September 2011 6	Simurq	4–2	Kəpəz	Zaqatala City Stadium
18:00 AZST (UTC+5)	Poškus 6'; Shmakov 32', 70'; Qirtimov (red card) 65'; Mikayilov 80'	Summary	Ţârlea (yellow card) 35' (yellow-red card) 45'; Fomenko 12'; Sultanov (red card) 74'; Feutchine 76'	Attendance: 1,500; Referee: Elchin Mämmädov

11 September 2011 5	Kəpəz	3–1	AZAL	Ganja City Stadium
17:00 AZST (UTC+5)	Karimov 1'; Feutchine 36'; Fomenko 81'	Summary	Bulku 45+2'	Attendance: 15,000; Referee: Aliyar Ağayev

23 September 2011 7	Inter Baku	0–0	Kəpəz	Shafa Stadium
19:00 AZST (UTC+5)		Summary		Attendance: 1,000; Referee: Rahim Hasanov

30 September 2011 8	Kəpəz	1–1	Sumgayit	Ganja City Stadium
AZST (UTC+5)	Sultanov 58'	Summary	Mammadov 33'	Attendance: 5,000

16 October 2011 9	Gabala	2–0	Kəpəz	Gabala City Stadium
15:00 AZST (UTC+5)	Burton 41'; Barbosa (red card) 44'; Dodo 57'	Summary		Attendance: 1,500; Referee: Rahim Hasanov

22 October 2011 10	Kəpəz	1–1	Neftchi	Ganja City Stadium
15:00 AZST (UTC+5)	Antic 19'	Summary	Guliev 48'	Attendance: 8,000; Referee: Anar Salmanov

28 October 2011 11	Khazar Lankaran	1–0	Kəpəz	Lankaran City Stadium
18:00 AZST (UTC+5)	Rusic 34'	Summary		Attendance: 4,500; Referee: Rahim Hasanov

4 November 2011 12	Kəpəz	1–3	Baku	Ganja City Stadium
14:00 AZT (UTC+4)	Feutchine 70'	Summary	Parks 12'; Česnauskis 36'; Šolić 65'	Attendance: 8,300; Referee: Elchin Mämmädov

19 November 2011 13	AZAL	2–0	Kəpəz	AZAL Stadium
16:00 AZT (UTC+4)	Arsenijević 38'; Tales Schutz 59'	Summary		Attendance: 1000; Referee: Fariz Yusifov

25 November 2011 14	Kəpəz	1–1	Turan	Ganja City Stadium
14:00 AZT (UTC+4)	Junivan 25'	Summary	S.Tagiyev 90'	Attendance: 2,000; Referee: Elvin skerov

4 December 2011 15	Ravan Baku	1–2	Kəpəz	Dalga Arena
16:00 AZT (UTC+4)	Igor Souza 57'	Summary	Fomenko 39'; Parkhachev 43'	Attendance: 200; Referee: Elchin Mämmädov

11 December 2011 16	Sumgayit	4–1	Kəpəz	Mehdi Huseynzade Stadium
14:00 AZT (UTC+4)	Nurahmadov 45', 88' (pen.); Israfilov 51'; Mustafayev 77'	Summary	Allahguliyev 15'	Attendance: 480; Referee: Anar Salmanov

16 December 2011 17	Kəpəz	1–4	Khazar Lankaran	Ganja City Stadium
14:00 AZT (UTC+4)	Parkhachev 7'; Antic (red card) 42'	Summary	Rusic 1'; Subašić 43'; Wobay 65'; Guliyev 90+1'	Attendance: 8,000; Referee: Aliyar Ağayev

21 December 2011 18	Neftchi	2–0	Kəpəz	Ismat Gayibov Stadium
14:00 AZT (UTC+4)	Flavinho 18' (pen.); Nasimov 44'; Mitreski (yellow card) 45+1' (yellow-red card) 55'	Summary	Feutchine (yellow card) 40' (yellow-red card) 66'	Attendance: 850; Referee: Anar Salmanov

16 February 2012 19	Kəpəz	0–1	Inter Baku	Ganja City Stadium
14:00 AZT (UTC+4)		Summary	Hajiyev 89'	Attendance: 700; Referee: Elchin Mämmädov

20 February 2012 20	Qarabağ	1–0	Kəpəz	Guzanli Olympic Stadium
14:00 AZT (UTC+4)	Adamia 27'	Summary	Ismayilov (yellow card) 73' (yellow-red card) 90+1'	Attendance: 2,000; Referee: Orkhan Mämmädov

3 March 2012 21	Kəpəz	2–0	Simurq	Ganja City Stadium
14:00 AZT (UTC+4)	Karimov 34'; Fomenko 67'	Summary		Attendance: 8,000; Referee: Fariz Yusifov

7 March 2012 22	Kəpəz	3–2	Gabala	Ganja City Stadium
14:00 AZT (UTC+4)	Allahguliyev 72'; Fomenko 76'; Junivan 88'	Summary	Baranin 32'; Burton (yellow card) 35' (red card) 35'; Kamanan 85'	Attendance: 2,000; Referee: Elchin Mämmädov

==== Table ====
Pos	Team	Pld	W	D	L	GF	GA	GD	Pts	Qualification
7	AZAL	22	8	5	9	35	35	0	29	Qualification for relegation group
8	Ravan Baku	22	6	7	9	23	29	−6	25	Qualification for relegation group
9	Kapaz	22	6	4	12	26	38	−12	22	Qualification for relegation group
10	Simurq	22	5	4	13	18	34	−16	19	Qualification for relegation group
11	Sumgayit	22	4	3	15	16	37	−21	15	Qualification for relegation group

Source: Soccerway: Azerbaijan Premier League Table
Rules for classification: 1) points; 2) goal difference; 3) number of goals scored.

=== Azerbaijan Premier League Relegation Group ===
11 March 2012 23	Simurq	1–1	Kəpəz	Zaqatala City Stadium
16:00 AZT (UTC+4)	Alunderis 18'; Yanotovsky (red card) 61'	Summary	Svezhentsev 45+2'; Sultanov (red card) 61'	Attendance: 400; Referee: Elvin Äsgärov

18 March 2012 24	Kəpəz	4–1	Sumgayit	Ganja City Stadium
14:00 AZT (UTC+4)	Fomenko 2', 24'; Guseynov 17' (o.g.); Junivan 85' (pen.)	Summary	Abbasov 48'	Attendance: 5,000; Referee: Vusal Äliyev

24 March 2012 25	AZAL	2–0	Kəpəz	AZAL Stadium
14:00 AZT (UTC+4)	Kvirtia 59'; Boghiu 72'	Summary		Attendance: 500; Referee: Elchin Mämmädov

2 April 2012 26	Kəpəz	1–0	Ravan Baku	Ganja City Stadium
16:00 AZST (UTC+5)	Fomenko 45' (pen.)	Summary		Attendance: 8,000; Referee: Fariz Yusifov

7 April 2012 27	Turan	2–0	Kəpəz	Tovuz City Stadium
16:00 AZST (UTC+5)	Mammadov 2'; Gogoberishvili 28' (pen.)	Summary		Attendance: 3,500; Referee: Elcin Askerov

15 April 2012 28	Sumgayit	2–0	Kəpəz	Mehdi Huseynzade Stadium
15:00 AZST (UTC+5)	Gurbanov 42', 74'	Summary		Attendance: 200; Referee: Elchin Mämmädov

22 April 2012 29	Kəpəz	0–2	AZAL	Ganja City Stadium
16:00 AZST (UTC+5)		Summary	Allahguliyev 55'; Narimanov 65'	Attendance: 3,000; Referee: Vusal Äliyev

28 April 2012 30	Ravan Baku	5–1	Kəpəz	Dalga Arena
16:30 AZST (UTC+5)	Vidaković 24'; Torres 56', 90+3'; Abbasov 71', 84'	Summary	Fomenko 75'	Attendance: 200; Referee: Fariz Yusifov

6 May 2012 31	Kəpəz	2–1	Turan Tovuz	Ganja City Stadium
17:30 AZST (UTC+5)	Sultanov 43' (pen.); Junivan 76'	Summary	Nabiyev 62'	Attendance: 1,500; Referee: Vusal Aliyev

12 May 2012 32	Kəpəz	0–1	Simurq	Ganja City Stadium
17:30 AZST (UTC+5)		Summary	Tarasovs 59'	Attendance: 1,200; Referee: Orkhan Mämmädov

==== Table ====
Pos	Team	Pld	W	D	L	GF	GA	GD	Pts	Qualification or relegation
7	AZAL	32	12	8	12	44	44	0	44	
8	Ravan Baku	32	10	11	11	39	39	0	41	
9	Simurq	32	8	10	14	27	41	−14	34	
10	Kapaz	32	9	5	18	35	55	−20	32	
11	Turan (R)	32	6	7	19	26	42	−16	25	Qualification for relegation playoffs
12	Sumgayit (R)	32	6	6	20	27	52	−25	24	Relegation to Azerbaijan First Division

Source: Soccerway.com
Rules for classification: 1) points; 2) goal difference; 3) number of goals scored.
(R) Relegated

=== Azerbaijan Cup ===
30 November 2011 First Round	Kəpəz	2–0	Bakili	Ganja City Stadium
13:00 AZT (UTC+4)	Sultanov 49', 66'	Summary		Attendance: 500; Referee: Vusal Aliyev

13 March 2012 Quarter Finals 1st Leg	Kəpəz	1–2	Neftchi Baku	Ganja City Stadium
14:00 AZT (UTC+4)	Fomenko 84'; Svezhentsev (red card) 90'	Summary	Denis 27'; Abdullayev 79'	Attendance: 6,500; Referee: Anar Salmanov

28 March 2012 Quarter Finals 2nd Leg	Neftchi Baku	1–1 (3–2 agg.)	Kəpəz	Ismat Gayibov Stadium
16:00 AZT (UTC+4)	Nasimov 50'; Seyidov (red card) 79'	Summary	Fomenko 33'; A.Ismayilov (red card) 79'	Attendance: 1,500; Referee: Rahim Hasanov

== Squad statistics ==
=== Appearances and goals ===
As of 14 May 2012

No.	Pos	Nat	Player	Total		Premier League		Azerbaijan Cup	
No.	Pos	Nat	Player	Apps	Goals	Apps	Goals	Apps	Goals
1	GK	(Azerbaijan) AZE	Khayal Zeynalov	2	0	2+0	0	0+0	0
2	DF	(Azerbaijan) AZE	Nijat Mammadov	8	0	7+0	0	1+0	0
4	DF	(Azerbaijan) AZE	Azer Mammadov	29	0	26+1	0	2+0	0
5	DF	(Azerbaijan) AZE	Ali Ismayilov	15	0	13+0	0	2+0	0
6	MF	(Azerbaijan) AZE	Vasif Aliyev	9	0	3+5	0	1+0	0
8	MF	(Cameroon) CMR	Guy Feutchine	30	3	26+2	3	1+1	0
9	DF	(Azerbaijan) AZE	Jeyhun Ahmadov	4	0	0+3	0	1+0	0
10	MF	(Azerbaijan) AZE	Jeyhun Sultanov	26	7	21+2	5	2+1	2
11	FW	(Azerbaijan) AZE	Sabir Allahguliyev	28	3	22+4	3	2+0	0
12	MF	(Egypt) EGY	Islam Emad	4	0	3+1	0	0+0	0
14	MF	(Belarus) BLR	Dmitri Parkhachev	28	3	19+7	3	0+2	0
15	DF	(Azerbaijan) AZE	Shahin Karimov	25	2	21+1	2	3+0	0
17	DF	(Azerbaijan) AZE	Renat Sultanov	21	0	11+8	0	2+0	0
18	MF	(Russia) RUS	Nikolay Svezhentsev	28	1	26+0	1	2+0	0
19	MF	(Azerbaijan) AZE	Zaur Asadov	18	0	8+9	0	1+0	0
20	MF	(Azerbaijan) AZE	Emin Aliyev	2	0	0+2	0	0+0	0
22	GK	(Azerbaijan) AZE	Tural Abbaszade	9	0	8+0	0	1+0	0
23	FW	(Brazil) BRA	Junivan	29	5	7+21	5	1+0	0
25	DF	(Moldova) MDA	Ion Arabadji	13	0	10+1	0	2+0	0
27	MF	(Azerbaijan) AZE	Parvin Pashayev	23	0	19+2	0	2+0	0
30	FW	(Ukraine) UKR	Yuriy Fomenko	35	13	32+0	11	2+1	2
88	GK	(Azerbaijan) AZE	Elshan Poladov	7	0	6+0	0	1+0	0
	GK	(Azerbaijan) AZE	Kanan Bayramov	1	0	1+0	0	0+0	0
	DF	(Azerbaijan) AZE	Mehman Mammadov	1	0	1+0	0	0+0	0
	DF	(Azerbaijan) AZE	Nail Mammadov	2	0	0+1	0	1+0	0
Players who appeared for Kəpəz no longer at the club:
3	DF	(Azerbaijan) AZE	Vasif Hagverdiyev	2	0	1+1	0	0+0	0
5	DF	(Turkey) TUR	Muammer Erdoğdu	12	0	12+0	0	0+0	0
6	DF	(Sierra Leone) SLE	Sidney Kargbo	1	0	1+0	0	0+0	0
7	MF	(Azerbaijan) AZE	Asef Gadiri	4	0	2+2	0	0+0	0
9	MF	(Azerbaijan) AZE	Khayal Garaev	2	0	0+2	0	0+0	0
22	GK	(Russia) RUS	Konstantin Kolesnikov	16	0	15+0	0	1+0	0
25	FW	(Ukraine) UKR	Anton Hay	8	0	4+3	0	1+0	0
32	DF	(Romania) ROU	Răzvan Ţârlea	4	0	2+2	0	0+0	0
33	DF	(Azerbaijan) AZE	Tabriz Huseynli	3	0	1+1	0	0+1	0
34	DF	(Azerbaijan) AZE	Javad Mirzaev	13	0	11+1	0	1+0	0
	DF	(Serbia) SRB	Milan Antić	11	1	11+0	1	0+0	0

=== Goal scorers ===
Place	Position	Nation	Number	Name	Premier League	Azerbaijan Cup	Total
1	FW	(Ukraine)	28	Yuriy Fomenko	11	2	13
2	MF	(Azerbaijan)	10	Jeyhun Sultanov	5	2	7
3	FW	(Brazil)	23	Junivan	5	0	5
4	MF	(Belarus)	14	Dmitri Parkhachev	3	0	3
4	MF	(Cameroon)	8	Guy Feutchine	3	0	3
4	FW	(Azerbaijan)	11	Sabir Allahguliyev	3	0	3
7	DF	(Azerbaijan)	15	Shahin Karimov	2	0	2
8	DF	(Serbia)		Milan Antić	1	0	1
9	MF	(Russia)	18	Nikolay Svezhentsev	1	0	1
9				Own goal	1	0	1
				TOTALS	35	4	39

=== Disciplinary record ===
Number	Nation	Position	Name	Premier League		Azerbaijan Cup		Total	
Number	Nation	Position	Name	Yellow card	Red card	Yellow card	Red card	Yellow card	Red card
2	(Turkey)	DF	Nijat Mammadov	1	0	1	0	2	0
4	(Azerbaijan)	DF	Azer Mammadov	4	0	0	0	4	0
5	(Azerbaijan)	DF	Ali Ismayilov	4	1	0	1	4	2
5	(Turkey)	DF	Muammer Erdoğdu	3	0	0	0	3	0
6	(Azerbaijan)	MF	Vasif Aliyev	1	0	0	0	1	0
8	(Cameroon)	MF	Guy Feutchine	6	1	0	0	6	1
10	(Azerbaijan)	MF	Jeyhun Sultanov	3	2	0	0	3	2
11	(Azerbaijan)	FW	Sabir Allahguliyev	5	0	0	0	5	0
12	(Egypt)	MF	Islam Emad	3	1	0	0	3	1
14	(Belarus)	MF	Dmitri Parkhachev	3	0	1	0	4	0
15	(Azerbaijan)	DF	Shahin Karimov	4	0	0	0	4	0
17	(Azerbaijan)	DF	Renat Sultanov	6	0	1	0	7	0
18	(Russia)	MF	Nikolay Svezhentsev	8	0	0	1	8	1
22	(Russia)	GK	Konstantin Kolesnikov	2	0	0	0	2	0
23	(Brazil)	FW	Junivan	6	0	0	0	6	0
25	(Ukraine)	FW	Anton Hay	3	0	0	0	3	0
25	(Moldova)	DF	Ion Arabadji	2	0	2	0	4	0
27	(Azerbaijan)	MF	Parvin Pashayev	2	0	0	0	2	0
30	(Ukraine)	FW	Yuriy Fomenko	3	0	0	0	3	0
34	(Azerbaijan)	DF	Javad Mirzaev	2	0	0	0	2	0
88	(Azerbaijan)	GK	Elshan Poladov	1	0	0	0	1	0
	(Azerbaijan)	GK	Kanan Bayramov	1	0	0	0	1	0
	(Azerbaijan)	DF	Nail Mämmädov	1	0	0	0	1	0
	(Romania)	DF	Răzvan Ţârlea	0	1	0	0	0	1
	(Serbia)	DF	Milan Antić	2	1	0	0	2	1
			TOTALS	76	7	5	2	81	9

=== Monthly awards ===
Month	Azerbaijan Professional Football League Awards	
Month	Player	Award
August	(Azerbaijan) Jeyhun Sultanov	Won
