= 2012–13 FC Kəpəz season =

Kəpəz
2012–13 season
- President: Tofig Zeynalov
- Manager: Fuad Ismayilov; Until 19 August 2012; Mahmud Gurbanov; From 19 August 2012
- Stadium: Ganja City Stadium
- Premier League: 12th
- Azerbaijan Cup: Second Round vs Qarabağ
- Top goalscorer: League: Parvin Pashayev (4); All: Yuriy Fomenko (6)
- Highest home attendance: 8,000 vs Turan Tovuz; 4 August 2012
- Lowest home attendance: 30 vs Turan Tovuz; 20 April 2013
- Average home league attendance: 1,881
Home colours	Away colours

The Kəpəz 2012–13 season was Kəpəz's third Azerbaijan Premier League season since their promotion back into the top flight. Kapaz started the season under Fuad Ismayilov, but he resigned on August 19, being replaced by Mahmud Gurbanov. Kəpəz finished the season in 12th place, getting relegated to the Azerbaijan First Division for the 2013-14 season, after being bottom of the league for all bar two weeks. They also participated in the 2012–13 Azerbaijan Cup, winning their first-round game against Qala 2-4, before losing to Qarabağ in extra time in the second round.

== Squad ==
As of 24 February 2013

Note: Flags indicate national team as defined under FIFA eligibility rules; some limited exceptions apply. Players may hold more than one non-FIFA nationality.

No.	Pos.	Nation	Player
1	GK	AZE	Ramil Karimov
2	DF	AZE	Ceyhun Ahmadov
3	DF	AZE	Samir Hüseynli
4	DF	AZE	Maharram Muslumzade
5	DF	AZE	Ali Ismayilov
6	DF	AZE	Mähärräm Hüseynov
7	MF	AZE	Parvin Pashayev
8	DF	AZE	Elvin Hasanaliyev
9	DF	RUS	Alan Soltanov
10	MF	AZE	Zaur Asadov
11	FW	AZE	Farid Guliyev
16	GK	AZE	Khayal Zeynalov (captain)

No.	Pos.	Nation	Player
17	MF	TKM	Pirkuli Saparov
18	MF	RUS	Nikolay Svezhentsev
19	DF	TKM	Rahimberdi Baltaýew
20	MF	AZE	Emin Aliyev
22	GK	AZE	Tural Abbaszade
23	MF	AZE	Anar Isgandarov
25	MF	AZE	Elgiz Kärämli
26	MF	AZE	Tural Dadashov
27	DF	AZE	Elvin Masiyev
29	DF	GEO	Giorgi Sepiashvili
30	FW	RUS	Vladislav Serebriakov
88	MF	MKD	Bujamin Asani

== Transfers ==
=== Summer ===
In: Note: Flags indicate national team as defined under FIFA eligibility rules; some limited exceptions apply. Players may hold more than one non-FIFA nationality.

No.	Pos.	Nation	Player
1	GK	CRO	Ivan Radoš (loan from (Hungary) Diósgyőri)
3	MF	AZE	Vasif Hagverdiyev
9	MF	GEO	Irakli Beraia (from (Georgia (country)) Dila Gori)
9	FW	AZE	Bakhtiyar Soltanov (from (Azerbaijan) Qarabağ)
11	DF	GEO	Goga Beraia (from (Georgia (country)) Zestafoni)
13	MF	AZE	Emin Imamaliev (loan from (Azerbaijan) Qarabağ)
24	DF	AZE	Farid Hashimzade (from (Azerbaijan) Ravan Baku)
66	DF	SRB	Ljuba Baranin (from (Azerbaijan) Gabala)
88	MF	MKD	Bujamin Asani (from (North Macedonia) Skopje)
—	FW	AZE	Ilgar Nabiyev
—	GK	FRA	Arsène Ondobo

Out: Note: Flags indicate national team as defined under FIFA eligibility rules; some limited exceptions apply. Players may hold more than one non-FIFA nationality.

No.	Pos.	Nation	Player
3	DF	AZE	Tabriz Huseynli
6	DF	SLE	Sidney Kargbo
9	MF	GEO	Irakli Beraia (to (Azerbaijan) Turan Tovuz)
10	FW	AZE	Ceyhun Sultanov (to (Azerbaijan) Sumgayit)
14	MF	BLR	Dmitri Parkhachev (to (Kazakhstan) Kaisar)
19	MF	AZE	Zaur Asadov
20	FW	AZE	Elchin Seyidov
22	GK	AZE	Tural Abbaszade
23	FW	BRA	Junivan Soares (Retired)
32	DF	ROU	Răzvan Ţârlea
66	DF	SRB	Ljuba Baranin (to (Serbia) Novi Pazar)
88	GK	AZE	Elshan Poladov (to (Azerbaijan) Inter Baku)
—	MF	AZE	Sabir Allahquliyev (to (Azerbaijan) Sumgayit City)

=== Winter ===
In: Note: Flags indicate national team as defined under FIFA eligibility rules; some limited exceptions apply. Players may hold more than one non-FIFA nationality.

No.	Pos.	Nation	Player
1	GK	AZE	Ramil Karimov (from (Azerbaijan) Taraggi)
2	MF	AZE	Jamshid Maharramov (from (Azerbaijan) Baku)
9	DF	RUS	Alan Soltanov
10	DF	AZE	Zaur Asadov
11	FW	AZE	Farid Guliyev (from (Azerbaijan) Turan Tovuz)
17	MF	TKM	Pirkuli Saparov (from (Turkmenistan) Altyn Asyr)
19	DF	TKM	Rahimberdi Baltaýew (from (Turkmenistan) Aşgabat)
25	MF	AZE	Elgiz Karamli (from (Azerbaijan) Neftchi Baku)
30	FW	RUS	Vladislav Serebriakov

Out: Note: Flags indicate national team as defined under FIFA eligibility rules; some limited exceptions apply. Players may hold more than one non-FIFA nationality.

No.	Pos.	Nation	Player
1	GK	CRO	Ivan Radoš (Loan return to (Hungary) Diósgyőri)
3	DF	AZE	Tabriz Huseynli (Released)
4	DF	AZE	Azer Mammadov (retired)
9	FW	AZE	Bakhtiyar Soltanov (Loan return to (Azerbaijan) Qarabağ)
10	MF	CMR	Guy Feutchine (to (Malaysia) Suruhanjaya Perkhidmatan Awam)
13	MF	AZE	Emin Imamaliev (Loan return to (Azerbaijan) Qarabağ)
24	DF	AZE	Farid Hashimzade (Released)
28	FW	UKR	Yuriy Fomenko (to (Azerbaijan) Inter Baku)
—	GK	FRA	Arsène Ondobo (Released)

== Competitions ==
=== Azerbaijan Premier League ===
==== Results summary ====
Overall								Home						Away					
Pld	W	D	L	GF	GA	GD	Pts	W	D	L	GF	GA	GD	W	D	L	GF	GA	GD
22	2	4	16	12	42	−30	10	1	4	6	3	10	−7	1	0	10	9	32	−23

Last updated: 4 March 2013.
Source: Soccerway

==== Results by round ====
Round	1	2	3	4	5	6	7	8	9	10	11	12	13	14	15	16	17	18	19	20	21	22
Ground	H	A	H	A	H	A	H	H	A	H	A	H	A	H	A	A	H	A	H	H	A	H
Result	L	L	L	L	W	L	W	D	L	D	L	D	L	L	L	L	L	L	L	L	L	D
Position	12	12	12	12	12	12	11	11	12	12	12	12	12	12	12	12	12	12	12	12	12	12

Source: Soccerway
A = Away; H = Home; W = Win; D = Draw; L = Loss

==== Results ====
4 August 2012 1	Kəpəz	1 – 2	Turan	Ganja
18:30 AZST (UTC+5)	I.Beraia 10'	Summary	Pipia 36'; Mammadov 69'	Stadium: Ganja City Stadium; Attendance: 8,000; Referee: Aliyar Agayev

10 August 2012 2	Khazar	4 – 0	Kəpəz	Lankaran
19:30 AZST (UTC+5)	Scarlatache 15'; Abishov 21'; Piţ 35'; Alviž 38'	Summary		Stadium: Lankaran City Stadium; Attendance: 5,500; Referee: Rahim Hasanov

18 August 2012 3	Kəpəz	0 – 2	AZAL	Ganja
18:00 AZST (UTC+5)		Summary	Nildo 30', 51'	Stadium: Ganja City Stadium; Attendance: 2,500; Referee: Vusal Aliyev

26 August 2012 4	Baku	3 – 1	Kəpəz	Baku
20:00 AZST (UTC+5)	Novruzov 20'; Mantzios 49', 76'	Summary	Huseynli (yellow card) 12' (yellow-red card) 17'; Fomenko 55'	Stadium: Tofig Bakhramov Stadium; Attendance: 600; Referee: Elvin Askerov

14 September 2012 5	Kəpəz	1 – 0	Gabala	Ganja
17:00 AZST (UTC+5)	Soltanov 41'	Summary		Stadium: Ganja City Stadium; Attendance: 4,000; Referee: Elchin Mämmädov

24 September 2012 6	Simurq	2 – 1	Kəpəz	Zaqatala
18:00 AZST (UTC+5)	Poljak 25'; Burkhardt 85'	Summary	Karimov 20'; Imamaliev (yellow card) 6' (yellow-red card) 89'	Stadium: Zaqatala City Stadium; Attendance: 2,000; Referee: Orkhan Mammadov

30 September 2012 7	Ravan Baku	1 – 2	Kəpəz	Baku
20:00 AZST (UTC+5)	Varea 40'	Summary	Fomenko 27'; Soltanov 45+1'	Stadium: Dalga Arena; Attendance: 960; Referee: Rauf Jabbarov

4 October 2012 8	Kəpəz	0 – 0	Qarabağ	Ganja
16:00 AZST (UTC+5)		Summary		Stadium: Ganja City Stadium; Attendance: 8,000; Referee: Elchin Mämmädov

19 October 2012 9	Neftchi	4 – 1	Kəpəz	Baku
16:00 AZST (UTC+5)	Wobay 23'; Canales 26', 64'; Abdullayev 70'	Summary	E.Aliyev 5'	Stadium: Ismat Gayibov Stadium; Attendance: 1,000; Referee: Elvin Askerov

26 October 2012 10	Kəpəz	0 – 0	Sumgayit	Ganja
16:00 AZST (UTC+5)		Summary		Stadium: Ganja City Stadium; Attendance: 1,000; Referee: Rahim Hasanov

30 October 2012 11	Inter Baku	3 – 1	Kəpəz	Baku
18:00 AZT (UTC+4)	Niasse 39', 45'; Tskhadadze 55'	Summary	E.Azizov 5'	Stadium: Shafa Stadium; Attendance: 700; Referee: Fariz Yusifov

3 November 2012 12	Kəpəz	0 – 0	Baku	Ganja
14:00 AZT (UTC+4)		Summary		Stadium: Ganja City Stadium; Attendance: 4,000; Referee: Elchin Mämmädov

19 November 2012 13	Gabala	2 – 0	Kəpəz	Qabala
14:00 AZT (UTC+4)	Mendy 61'; Abdullayev 66' (pen.)	Summary		Stadium: Gabala City Stadium; Attendance: 1,080; Referee: Rahim Hasanov

24 November 2012 14	Kəpəz	0 – 1	Khazar	Ganja
14:00 AZT (UTC+4)		Summary	Subašić 8' (pen.)	Stadium: Ganja City Stadium; Attendance: 2,000; Referee: Vusal Äliyev

2 December 2012 15	Turan	5 – 1	Kəpəz	Tovuz
14:00 AZT (UTC+4)	S.Ballo 2', 19', 58'; Guliyev 44'; Günlü 72'	Summary	Krutskevich 52' (o.g.)	Stadium: Tovuz City Stadium; Attendance: 4,500; Referee: Elchin Mämmädov

7 December 2012 16	Qarabağ	3 – 1	Kəpəz	Quzanlı
16:00 AZT (UTC+4)	Richard 7'; Javadov 21'; Ismayilov 89'	Summary	Fomenko 90+2'	Stadium: Guzanli Olympic Complex Stadium; Attendance: 250; Referee: Rauf Jabbarov

15 December 2012 17	Kəpəz	0 – 2	Inter Baku	Ganja
14:00 AZT (UTC+4)		Summary	Levin 23'; Hajiyev 72'	Stadium: Ganja City Stadium; Attendance: 1,000; Referee: Aliyar Ağayev

20 December 2012 18	Sumgayit	2 – 1	Kəpəz	Sumgayit
16:00 AZT (UTC+4)	S.Allahquliyev 88'; Mirzabekov 90+1'	Summary	Imamaliev 47'; Asani (yellow card) 20' (yellow-red card) 74'	Stadium: Mehdi Huseynzade Stadium; Attendance: 150; Referee: Anar Salmanov

9 February 2013 19	Kəpəz	0 – 3	Neftchi	Baku
15:00 AZT (UTC+4)		Summary	Flavinho 27'; Canales 68'; Abdullayev 72'	Stadium: Dalga Arena; Attendance: 400; Referee: Aliyar Ağayev

16 February 2013 20	Kəpəz	0 – 2	Ravan Baku	Baku
15:00 AZT (UTC+4)		Summary	Kalonas 7'; Abbasov 64'	Stadium: Dalga Arena; Attendance: 150; Referee: Orkhan Mämmädov

23 February 2013 21	AZAL	3 – 0	Kəpəz	Baku
18:00 AZT (UTC+4)	Tagiyev 27'; Safiyaroglu 37'; Igbekoi 81'	Summary		Stadium: AZAL Stadium; Attendance: 200; Referee: Rauf Jabbarov

3 March 2013 22	Kəpəz	1 – 1	Simurq	Baku
15:00 AZT (UTC+4)	S.Karimov 11'	Summary	Božić 53'	Stadium: Dalga Arena; Attendance: 50; Referee: Anar Salmanov

==== League table ====
Pos	Team	Pld	W	D	L	GF	GA	GD	Pts	Qualification
8	Khazar Lankaran	22	7	7	8	32	27	+5	28	Qualification for relegation group
9	Turan	22	6	5	11	24	35	−11	23	Qualification for relegation group
10	Sumgayit	22	5	7	10	20	39	−19	22	Qualification for relegation group
11	Ravan Baku	22	6	4	12	23	36	−13	22	Qualification for relegation group
12	Kapaz	22	2	4	16	12	45	−33	10	Qualification for relegation group

Source: Association of Football Federations of Azerbaijan and Soccerway.com
Rules for classification: 1) points; 2) goal difference; 3) number of goals scored.

=== Azerbaijan Premier League Relegation Group ===
==== Results summary ====
Overall								Home						Away					
Pld	W	D	L	GF	GA	GD	Pts	W	D	L	GF	GA	GD	W	D	L	GF	GA	GD
10	3	0	7	10	19	−9	9	2	0	3	5	7	−2	1	0	4	5	12	−7

Last updated: 20 May 2013.
Source: Soccerway

==== Results by round ====
Round	1	2	3	4	5	6	7	8	9	10
Ground	H	A	H	A	H	H	A	H	A	A
Result	L	L	L	L	L	W	L	W	W	L
Position	12	12	12	12	12	12	12	12	12	12

Updated to match(es) played on 20 May 2013. Source: Soccerway
A = Away; H = Home; W = Win; D = Draw; L = Loss

==== Results ====
13 March 2013 23	Kəpəz	1 – 3	AZAL	Baku
15:00 AZT (UTC+4)	Guliyev 53'	Summary	Nildo 17', 29' (pen.); Igbekoi 47'	Stadium: Dalga Arena; Attendance: 100; Referee: Elchin Mämmädov

30 March 2013 24	Sumgayit	1 – 0	Kəpəz	Baku
15:00 AZT (UTC+4)	Doymuş 67' (pen.)	Summary		Stadium: Bayil Stadium; Attendance: 100; Referee: Elvin Äsgärov

6 April 2013 25	Kəpəz	1 – 2	Khazar Lankaran	Baku
16:00 AZST (UTC+5)	E.Hasanaliyev 90+2'	Summary	Sialmas 30'; Piț 45+1'	Stadium: Dalga Arena; Attendance: 200; Referee: Elchin Mämmädov

13 April 2013 26	Ravan Baku	3 – 0	Kəpəz	Baku
17:00 AZST (UTC+5)	Varea 42', 55'; T.Mikayilov 57'	Summary		Stadium: Dalga Arena; Attendance: 200; Referee: Ramil Diniyev

20 April 2013 27	Kəpəz	0 – 1	Turan Tovuz	Baku
17:00 AZST (UTC+5)		Summary	Ballo 51'	Stadium: Dalga Arena; Attendance: 30; Referee: Omar Paşayev

27 April 2013 28	Kəpəz	1 – 0	Sumgayit	Baku
17:00 AZST (UTC+5)	P.Pashayev 69'	Summary		Stadium: Dalga Arena; Attendance: 50; Referee: Elvin Äsgärov

3 May 2013 29	Khazar Lankaran	1 – 0	Kəpəz	Lankaran
19:00 AZST (UTC+5)	Sadio 50'	Summary		Stadium: Lankaran City Stadium; Attendance: 2,700; Referee: Orkhan Mämmädov

8 May 2013 30	Kəpəz	3 – 1	Ravan Baku	Baku
18:00 AZST (UTC+5)	Asani 41'; Serebriakov 82', 89'	Summary	Qarayev 90+3'	Stadium: Dalga Arena; Attendance: 50

13 May 2013 31	Turan Tovuz	3 – 5	Kəpəz	Baku
17:30 AZST (UTC+5)	Gadiri 44' (pen.); Ballo 59', 87'	Summary	Pashayev 47', 68', 75' (pen.); Asani 52'; Serebriakov 82'	Stadium: Dalga Arena; Attendance: 52; Referee: Ramil Ähmädov

20 May 2013 32	AZAL	4 – 0	Kəpəz	Baku
18:00 AZST (UTC+5)	Igbekoi 6', 30'; Tagizade 30'; Kļava 70'	Summary		Stadium: AZAL Stadium; Attendance: 250; Referee: Ramil Ähmädov

==== Table ====
Pos	Team	Pld	W	D	L	GF	GA	GD	Pts	Qualification or relegation
8	Khazar Lankaran	32	10	10	12	40	37	+3	40	Qualification for Europa League first qualifying round (Note: Khazar Lankaran qualified for the first qualifying round of the 2013–14 UEFA Europa League as winner of the 2012–13 Azerbaijan Cup.)
9	Ravan Baku	32	12	4	16	46	53	−7	40	
10	Sumgayit	32	9	8	15	31	49	−18	35	
11	Turan (R)	32	8	6	18	34	59	−25	30	Relegation to Azerbaijan First Division
12	Kapaz (R)	32	5	4	23	22	64	−42	19	Relegation to Azerbaijan First Division

Source: Association of Football Federations of Azerbaijan
Rules for classification: 1) points; 2) goal difference; 3) number of goals scored.
(R) Relegated

=== Azerbaijan Cup ===
22 October 2012 First Round	Qala	2 – 4	Kəpəz	Baku
17:00 AZST (UTC+5)	Fazai 81', 85'	Summary	Fomenko 2', 13', 60'; Soltanov 45+1'	Stadium: Zira District Stadium; Attendance: 150; Referee: Vusal Äliyev

28 November 2012 Second Round	Kəpəz	0 – 2 (a.e.t.)	Qarabağ	Ganja
13:00 AZT (UTC+4)		Summary	B.Asani 100' (o.g.); Ismayilov 115'	Stadium: Ganja City Stadium; Attendance: 500; Referee: Aliyar Ağayev

== Squad statistics ==
As of 21 May 2013

=== Appearances and goals ===
No.	Pos	Nat	Player	Total		Premier League		Azerbaijan Cup	
No.	Pos	Nat	Player	Apps	Goals	Apps	Goals	Apps	Goals
1	GK	(Azerbaijan) AZE	Ramil Karimov	5	0	5+0	0	0+0	0
2	MF	(Azerbaijan) AZE	Jamshid Maharramov	8	0	8+0	0	0+0	0
3	DF	(Russia) RUS	Vüsal İbrahimov	1	0	0+1	0	0+0	0
4	DF	(Azerbaijan) AZE	Maharram Muslumzade	9	0	8+1	0	0+0	0
5	DF	(Azerbaijan) AZE	Matlab Mämmädov	3	0	0+3	0	0+0	0
6	DF	(Azerbaijan) AZE	Mähärräm Hüseynov	27	0	22+3	0	2+0	0
7	MF	(Azerbaijan) AZE	Parvin Pashayev	19	4	11+7	4	1+0	0
8	MF	(Azerbaijan) AZE	Elvin Häsänäliyev	21	1	13+8	1	0+0	0
9	DF	(Russia) RUS	Alan Soltanov	12	0	9+3	0	0+0	0
10	MF	(Azerbaijan) AZE	Zaur Asadov	7	0	2+5	0	0+0	0
11	FW	(Azerbaijan) AZE	Farid Guliyev	12	1	11+1	1	0+0	0
14	MF	(Azerbaijan) AZE	Elxan Äzizov	22	1	11+9	1	2+0	0
15	DF	(Azerbaijan) AZE	Shahin Karimov	31	2	28+2	2	1+0	0
16	GK	(Azerbaijan) AZE	Khayal Zeynalov	12	0	11+1	0	0+0	0
17	MF	(Turkmenistan) TKM	Pirkuli Saparov	2	0	2+0	0	0+0	0
18	MF	(Russia) RUS	Nikolay Svezhentsev	25	0	22+2	0	1+0	0
19	DF	(Turkmenistan) TKM	Rahimberdi Baltaýew	3	0	3+0	0	0+0	0
20	DF	(Azerbaijan) AZE	Emin Aliyev	20	1	14+4	1	2+0	0
22	GK	(Azerbaijan) AZE	Tural Abbaszade	6	0	6+0	0	0+0	0
23	DF	(Azerbaijan) AZE	Ravil Müslümov	6	0	1+5	0	0+0	0
25	MF	(Azerbaijan) AZE	Elgiz Kärämli	12	0	11+1	0	0+0	0
27	MF	(Azerbaijan) AZE	Kamran Babayev	3	0	0+3	0	0+0	0
29	DF	(Georgia (country)) GEO	Giorgi Sepiashvili	18	0	14+3	0	0+1	0
30	FW	(Russia) RUS	Vladislav Serebriakov	9	3	5+4	3	0+0	0
88	MF	(North Macedonia) MKD	Bujamin Asani	27	2	25+0	2	2+0	0
Players who appeared for Kəpəz no longer at the club:
1	GK	(Croatia) CRO	Ivan Radoš	13	0	10+1	0	2+0	0
2	DF	(Azerbaijan) AZE	Nicat Mammadov	14	0	10+2	0	2+0	0
3	DF	(Azerbaijan) AZE	Tabriz Huseynli	5	0	4+1	0	0+0	0
3	DF	(Russia) RUS	Samir Hüseynli	2	0	2+0	0	0+0	0
4	DF	(Azerbaijan) AZE	Azer Mammadov	16	0	14+0	0	2+0	0
5	DF	(Azerbaijan) AZE	Ali Ismayilov	3	0	3+0	0	0+0	0
9	FW	(Azerbaijan) AZE	Bakhtiyar Soltanov	13	3	9+2	2	2+0	1
9	MF	(Georgia (country)) GEO	Irakli Beraia	3	1	3+0	1	0+0	0
10	MF	(Cameroon) CMR	Guy Feutchine	18	0	17+0	0	1+0	0
11	MF	(Georgia (country)) GEO	Goga Beraia	3	0	1+2	0	0+0	0
11	FW	(Azerbaijan) AZE	Ziyabil Mämmädov	5	0	0+4	0	0+1	0
13	MF	(Azerbaijan) AZE	Emin Imamaliev	11	1	10+0	1	1+0	0
17	DF	(Azerbaijan) AZE	Renat Sultanov	1	0	1+0	0	0+0	0
17	DF	(Azerbaijan) AZE	Jeyhun Ahmadov	9	0	2+5	0	1+1	0
19	DF	(Azerbaijan) AZE	Atin Abdullayev	5	0	2+2	0	0+1	0
23	DF	(Azerbaijan) AZE	Vüqar İbrahimov	3	0	2+1	0	0+0	0
24	DF	(Azerbaijan) AZE	Färid Häşimzadä	2	0	2+0	0	0+0	0
30	FW	(Ukraine) UKR	Yuriy Fomenko	20	6	18+0	3	2+0	3
66	DF	(Serbia) SRB	Ljuba Baranin	3	0	3+0	0	0+0	0

=== Goal scorers ===
Place	Position	Nation	Number	Name	Premier League	Azerbaijan Cup	Total
1	FW	(Ukraine)	11	Yuriy Fomenko	3	3	6
2	MF	(Azerbaijan)	7	Parvin Pashayev	4	0	4
3	FW	(Russia)	30	Vladislav Serebriakov	3	0	3
3	FW	(Azerbaijan)	9	Bakhtiyar Soltanov	2	1	3
4	DF	(Azerbaijan)	15	Shahin Karimov	2	0	2
4	MF	(North Macedonia)	88	Bujamin Asani	2	0	2
6	FW	(Georgia (country))	11	Irakli Beraia	1	0	1
6	DF	(Azerbaijan)	20	Emin Aliyev	1	0	1
6	MF	(Azerbaijan)	14	Elxan Äzizov	1	0	1
6	MF	(Azerbaijan)	13	Emin Imamaliev	1	0	1
6	FW	(Azerbaijan)	11	Farid Guliyev	1	0	1
6	MF	(Azerbaijan)	8	Elvin Häsänäliyev	1	0	1
6				Own goal	1	0	1
				TOTALS	23	4	27

=== Disciplinary record ===
Number	Nation	Position	Name	Premier League		Azerbaijan Cup		Total	
Number	Nation	Position	Name	Yellow card	Red card	Yellow card	Red card	Yellow card	Red card
2	(Azerbaijan)	DF	Jamshid Maharramov	3	0	0	0	3	0
2	(Azerbaijan)	DF	Nicat Mammadov	4	0	0	0	4	0
3	(Azerbaijan)	DF	Tabriz Huseynli	3	1	0	0	3	1
4	(Azerbaijan)	DF	Maharram Muslumzade	3	0	0	0	3	0
4	(Azerbaijan)	DF	Azer Mammadov	5	0	0	0	5	0
5	(Azerbaijan)	DF	Ali Ismayilov	1	0	0	0	1	0
6	(Azerbaijan)	DF	Mähärräm Hüseynov	8	0	0	0	8	0
7	(Azerbaijan)	MF	Parvin Pashayev	1	0	0	0	1	0
8	(Azerbaijan)	MF	Elvin Häsänäliyev	2	0	0	0	2	0
9	(Russia)	DF	Alan Soltanov	3	0	0	0	3	0
9	(Azerbaijan)	FW	Bakhtiyar Soltanov	5	0	0	0	5	0
10	(Cameroon)	MF	Guy Feutchine	5	0	0	0	5	0
11	(Azerbaijan)	FW	Farid Guliyev	4	0	0	0	4	0
11	(Azerbaijan)	FW	Ziyabil Mämmädov	1	0	0	0	1	0
11	(Georgia (country))	MF	Goga Beraia	1	0	0	0	1	0
13	(Azerbaijan)	MF	Emin Imamaliev	4	1	0	0	4	1
14	(Azerbaijan)	MF	Elxan Äzizov	1	0	0	0	1	0
15	(Azerbaijan)	DF	Shahin Karimov	6	0	0	0	6	0
16	(Azerbaijan)	GK	Khayal Zeynalov	4	0	0	0	4	0
17	(Azerbaijan)	DF	Renat Sultanov	1	0	0	0	1	0
18	(Russia)	MF	Nikolay Svezhentsev	5	0	0	0	5	0
19	(Azerbaijan)	DF	Atin Abdullayev	1	0	0	0	1	0
20	(Azerbaijan)	MF	Emin Aliyev	1	0	0	0	1	0
22	(Azerbaijan)	GK	Tural Abbaszade	1	0	0	0	1	0
23	(Azerbaijan)	MF	Anar İsgändärov	1	0	0	0	1	0
24	(Azerbaijan)	DF	Färid Häşimzadä	1	0	0	0	1	0
25	(Azerbaijan)	MF	Elgiz Kärämli	3	0	0	0	3	0
29	(Georgia (country))	DF	Giorgi Sepiashvili	5	0	0	0	5	0
30	(Ukraine)	FW	Yuriy Fomenko	1	0	0	0	1	0
30	(Russia)	FW	Vladislav Serebriakov	2	0	0	0	2	0
88	(North Macedonia)	MF	Bujamin Asani	10	1	0	0	10	1
			TOTALS	96	3	0	0	96	3
