= List of Azerbaijan football transfers winter 2012 =

This is a list of Azerbaijan football transfers in the winter transfer window 2012 by club. Only clubs of the 2011–12 Azerbaijan Premier League are included.

== Azerbaijan Premier League 2011-12 ==
=== AZAL Baku ===
In: Note: Flags indicate national team as defined under FIFA eligibility rules; some limited exceptions apply. Players may hold more than one non-FIFA nationality.

No.	Pos.	Nation	Player
13	DF	AZE	Shahriyar Rahimov (on loan from (Azerbaijan) Inter Baku)
25	DF	AZE	Tural Narimanov (on loan from (Azerbaijan) Neftchi Baku)

Out: Note: Flags indicate national team as defined under FIFA eligibility rules; some limited exceptions apply. Players may hold more than one non-FIFA nationality.

No.	Pos.	Nation	Player
9	MF	AZE	Vusal Garayev (to (Azerbaijan) Ravan Baku)
23	MF	NGA	Pius Ikedia (to (Northern Cyprus) Mağusa Türk Gücü)
25	FW	ARG	Cristian Ruiz (to (Colombia) Deportivo Pereira)

=== Baku ===
In: Note: Flags indicate national team as defined under FIFA eligibility rules; some limited exceptions apply. Players may hold more than one non-FIFA nationality.

No.	Pos.	Nation	Player
2	DF	CRO	Duje Baković (from (Croatia) NK Rijeka)
10	MF	SVN	Lucas Mario Horvat (from (Slovenia) NK Domžale)
24	MF	SRB	Nenad Kovačević (from (Serbia) Red Star Belgrade)
98	FW	ESP	Koke (from (Spain) Rayo Vallecano)

Out: Note: Flags indicate national team as defined under FIFA eligibility rules; some limited exceptions apply. Players may hold more than one non-FIFA nationality.

No.	Pos.	Nation	Player
10	MF	AZE	Nijat Abdullayev
20	MF	AZE	Fábio Luís Ramim
29	MF	AZE	Aziz Guliyev (to (Azerbaijan) Inter Baku)
32	DF	MDA	Alexei Savinov
33	DF	SRB	Stevan Bates (to (Serbia) FK Rad)
39	MF	UKR	Ruslan Levyha (to (Ukraine) Olimpik Donetsk)
85	FW	BRA	Jabá (to (Turkey) Antalyaspor)
—	DF	AZE	Emin Jafarguliyev (on loan to (Azerbaijan) Simurq)

=== Gabala ===
In: Note: Flags indicate national team as defined under FIFA eligibility rules; some limited exceptions apply. Players may hold more than one non-FIFA nationality.

No.	Pos.	Nation	Player
11	FW	FRA	Yannick Kamanan (from (Turkey) Mersin İdmanyurdu SK)
21	MF	AZE	Elmar Bakhshiev (from (Azerbaijan) Neftchi Baku)

Out: Note: Flags indicate national team as defined under FIFA eligibility rules; some limited exceptions apply. Players may hold more than one non-FIFA nationality.

No.	Pos.	Nation	Player
11	FW	CIV	Serge Djiehoua (to (Turkey) Boluspor joined at the start of the 2012-13 Season)

=== Inter Baku ===
In: Note: Flags indicate national team as defined under FIFA eligibility rules; some limited exceptions apply. Players may hold more than one non-FIFA nationality.

No.	Pos.	Nation	Player
25	MF	SEN	Ibrahima Niasse (from (Switzerland) Neuchâtel Xamax)
29	MF	AZE	Aziz Guliyev (from (Azerbaijan) FC Baku)

Out: Note: Flags indicate national team as defined under FIFA eligibility rules; some limited exceptions apply. Players may hold more than one non-FIFA nationality.

No.	Pos.	Nation	Player
5	DF	AZE	Rustam Abbasov (on loan to (Azerbaijan) Simurq)
7	MF	AZE	Ruslan Poladov (on loan to (Azerbaijan) Simurq)
72	GK	AZE	Dmitri Kramarenko (on loan to (Azerbaijan) Simurq)
—	DF	AZE	Shahriyar Rahimov (on loan to (Azerbaijan) AZAL)

=== Qarabağ ===
In: Note: Flags indicate national team as defined under FIFA eligibility rules; some limited exceptions apply. Players may hold more than one non-FIFA nationality.

No.	Pos.	Nation	Player
—	FW	AZE	Vagif Javadov (from (Russia) Volga Nizhny Novgorod)
—	DF	AZE	Eltun Yagublu (from (Azerbaijan) Neftchi Baku)
—	MF	MKD	Muarem Muarem (from (North Macedonia) FK Rabotnički)

Out: Note: Flags indicate national team as defined under FIFA eligibility rules; some limited exceptions apply. Players may hold more than one non-FIFA nationality.

No.	Pos.	Nation	Player
—	FW	BRA	Leo Rocha (to (Brazil) Treze)

=== Kəpəz ===
In: Note: Flags indicate national team as defined under FIFA eligibility rules; some limited exceptions apply. Players may hold more than one non-FIFA nationality.

No.	Pos.	Nation	Player
—	DF	ROU	Răzvan Ţârlea (from (Azerbaijan) Gabala)
—	DF	SRB	Milan Antić (to (Azerbaijan) Gabala)
—	DF	AZE	Nail Mammadov (from (Azerbaijan) Taraggi)
1	GK	AZE	Khayal Zeynalov (loan return from (Azerbaijan) Taraggi FC)
5	DF	AZE	Ali Ismailov (from (Azerbaijan) Taraggi FC)
7	MF	GEO	Giorgi Sepiashvili (from (Georgia (country)) Spartaki-Tskhinvali)
9	MF	AZE	Jeyhun Ahmadov (from (Azerbaijan) Taraggi FC)
22	GK	AZE	Tural Abbaszade (from (Azerbaijan) Simurq)
25	MF	MDA	Ivan Arabaçi (from (Moldova) Rapid Chişinău)

Out: Note: Flags indicate national team as defined under FIFA eligibility rules; some limited exceptions apply. Players may hold more than one non-FIFA nationality.

No.	Pos.	Nation	Player
3	DF	AZE	Vasif Hagverdiyev
5	DF	TUR	Muammer Erdoğdu (to (Azerbaijan) Turan Tovuz)
6	MF	SLE	Sidney Kargbo
7	MF	AZE	Asef Gadiri (to (Azerbaijan) Turan Tovuz)
9	MF	AZE	Khayal Garaev (to (Azerbaijan) Turan Tovuz)
22	GK	RUS	Konstantin Kolesnikov
25	FW	UKR	Anton Hay
34	DF	AZE	Javad Mirzaev (to (Azerbaijan) Turan Tovuz)
—	DF	SRB	Milan Antić (to (Albania) Tërbuni Pukë)
—	DF	ROU	Răzvan Ţârlea

=== Khazar Lankaran ===
In: Note: Flags indicate national team as defined under FIFA eligibility rules; some limited exceptions apply. Players may hold more than one non-FIFA nationality.

No.	Pos.	Nation	Player
4	MF	AZE	Akif Taghiyev (from (Azerbaijan) Turan)
6	MF	CRO	Robert Alviž (from (Cyprus) Anagennisi Dherynia)
12	FW	MLI	Salif Ballo (from (Mali) AS Real Bamako)
15	MF	MLI	Tounkara Sadio (from (Mali) Jeanne d'Arc FC)
21	DF	BUL	Radomir Todorov (from (Bulgaria) Spartak Varna)
30	FW	CRC	Randall Brenes (from (Costa Rica) Cartaginés)
33	DF	SRB	Stevan Bates (on loan from (Serbia) FK Rad)
38	MF	AZE	Gafar Aliyev (from (Azerbaijan) Ravan Baku)

Out: Note: Flags indicate national team as defined under FIFA eligibility rules; some limited exceptions apply. Players may hold more than one non-FIFA nationality.

No.	Pos.	Nation	Player
15	FW	NGA	Emeka Opara (to (Kuwait) Al Naser)
20	MF	AZE	Eldar Ismayilov
27	MF	AZE	Habil Nurəhmədov (to (Azerbaijan) AZAL)
32	MF	ESP	Mario Rosas (to (Spain) SD Huesca)
33	FW	SVN	Dejan Rusič (to (United Arab Emirates) Al-Taawon)
84	MF	SLE	Julius Wobay (to (Egypt) Al-Masry Club)

=== Neftchi Baku ===
In: Note: Flags indicate national team as defined under FIFA eligibility rules; some limited exceptions apply. Players may hold more than one non-FIFA nationality.

No.	Pos.	Nation	Player

Out: Note: Flags indicate national team as defined under FIFA eligibility rules; some limited exceptions apply. Players may hold more than one non-FIFA nationality.

No.	Pos.	Nation	Player
—	MF	AZE	Elmar Bakhshiev (to (Azerbaijan) Gabala)
—	MF	AZE	Nijat Gurbanov (on loan to (Azerbaijan) Simurq)
—	FW	AZE	Ilham Allahverdiyev (on loan to (Azerbaijan) Simurq)
—	DF	AZE	Tarlan Guliyev (on loan to (Azerbaijan) Sumgayit)
—	DF	AZE	Tural Narimanov (on loan to (Azerbaijan) AZAL)
—	MF	AZE	Elvin Musazade (on loan to (Azerbaijan) Ravan Baku)
—	DF	AZE	Elton Yagublu (to (Azerbaijan) FK Qarabağ)
—	MF	AZE	Araz Abdullayev (loan return to (England) Everton // on loan to (Greece) Panionios)

=== Ravan Baku ===
In: Note: Flags indicate national team as defined under FIFA eligibility rules; some limited exceptions apply. Players may hold more than one non-FIFA nationality.

No.	Pos.	Nation	Player
7	MF	AZE	Elvin Musazade (on loan from (Azerbaijan) Neftchi Baku)
9	MF	AZE	Vusal Garayev (from (Azerbaijan) AZAL)
10	FW	SRB	Nemanja Vidaković (from (Bosnia and Herzegovina) Borac Banja Luka)
14	MF	UKR	Serhiy Artiukh (from (Azerbaijan) Turan Tovuz)
25	DF	AZE	Orkhan Lalayev (loan return from (Azerbaijan) FC Shusha)
30	MF	AZE	Maharram Muslumzade (from (Azerbaijan) Turan Tovuz)
61	GK	RUS	Ivan Vasiliev (from (Azerbaijan) Karvan)
—	DF	AZE	Elmar Yehyabeyov (from (Azerbaijan) Shahdag Qusar)
—	DF	AZE	Ramil Nuriyev (from (Azerbaijan) Sumgayit)
—	DF	AZE	Asif Zeynalov (from (Azerbaijan) Bakili Baku)

Out: Note: Flags indicate national team as defined under FIFA eligibility rules; some limited exceptions apply. Players may hold more than one non-FIFA nationality.

No.	Pos.	Nation	Player
1	GK	EST	Artur Kotenko (to (Finland) FF Jaro)
7	MF	BRA	Igor Souza
9	FW	SWE	John Pelu (to (Norway) Strindheim IL)
10	FW	URU	Ángel Gutiérrez (to (Guatemala) Deportivo Mictlán)
19	FW	CMR	Bong Bertrand (to (Bahrain) Al-Ahli)
30	MF	RUS	Sharapudin Shalbuzov
—	DF	AZE	Elkhan Jabrailov
—	MF	AZE	Anar Gasymov (to (Azerbaijan) FK Neftchala)
—	DF	AZE	Sabuhi Hasanov

=== Simurq ===
In: Note: Flags indicate national team as defined under FIFA eligibility rules; some limited exceptions apply. Players may hold more than one non-FIFA nationality.

No.	Pos.	Nation	Player
—	MF	AZE	Nijat Gurbanov (on loan from (Azerbaijan) Neftchi Baku)
—	FW	AZE	Ilham Allahverdiyev (on loan from (Azerbaijan) Neftchi Baku)
—	DF	AZE	Emin Jafarguliyev (on loan from (Azerbaijan) FC Baku)
—	GK	AZE	Dmitri Kramarenko (on loan from (Azerbaijan) Inter Baku)
—	MF	AZE	Ruslan Poladov (on loan from (Azerbaijan) Inter Baku)
—	DF	AZE	Rustam Abbasov (on loan from (Azerbaijan) Inter Baku)
—	FW	MDA	Veaceslav Sofroni (from (Moldova) FC Costuleni)
—	FW	MDA	Anatolie Doroş (from (Kazakhstan) FC Irtysh)
—	MF	LVA	Igors Tarasovs (from (Latvia) Skonto Riga)

Out: Note: Flags indicate national team as defined under FIFA eligibility rules; some limited exceptions apply. Players may hold more than one non-FIFA nationality.

No.	Pos.	Nation	Player
—	GK	CRO	Adnan Hodžić (to (Croatia) Crikvenica)
—	DF	AZE	Anar Hasanli
—	DF	AZE	Aleksandr Shemonayev
—	MF	UKR	Yevhen Shmakov
—	MF	AZE	Elchin Khalilov
—	MF	AZE	Samir Guliyev
—	FW	LVA	Kristaps Grebis (to (Germany) BFC Viktoria 1889)

=== Sumgayit City ===
In: Note: Flags indicate national team as defined under FIFA eligibility rules; some limited exceptions apply. Players may hold more than one non-FIFA nationality.

No.	Pos.	Nation	Player
—	FW	AZE	Uğur Pamuk (from (Germany) TuS Dornberg)
—	DF	AZE	Tarlan Guliyev (on loan from (Azerbaijan) Neftchi Baku)
—	FW	AZE	Yasin Abbasov (from (Azerbaijan) Turan Tovuz)
—	GK	AZE	Ruslan Majidov (as a free agent)

Out: Note: Flags indicate national team as defined under FIFA eligibility rules; some limited exceptions apply. Players may hold more than one non-FIFA nationality.

No.	Pos.	Nation	Player
—	MF	AZE	Rashad Kerimov
—	DF	AZE	Ramil Nuriyev (to (Azerbaijan) Ravan Baku)
—	MF	AZE	Aqil Mammadov
—	DF	AZE	Eldar Mammadov

=== Turan ===
In: Note: Flags indicate national team as defined under FIFA eligibility rules; some limited exceptions apply. Players may hold more than one non-FIFA nationality.

No.	Pos.	Nation	Player
—	DF	GHA	Seidu Salifu
—	DF	AZE	Javad Mirzaev (from (Azerbaijan) FC Kəpəz)
—	DF	TUR	Muammer Erdoğdu (from (Azerbaijan) FC Kəpəz)
—	MF	AZE	Asef Gadiri (from (Azerbaijan) FC Kəpəz)
—	MF	AZE	Khayal Garayev (from (Azerbaijan) FC Kəpəz)
—	MF	MDA	Daniel Pisla (from (Moldova) Academia Chişinău)

Out: Note: Flags indicate national team as defined under FIFA eligibility rules; some limited exceptions apply. Players may hold more than one non-FIFA nationality.

No.	Pos.	Nation	Player
6	DF	MNE	Aleksandar Dubljević (to (Montenegro) Čelik Nikšić)
7	MF	AZE	Ramal Huseynov
8	MF	AZE	Akif Taghiyev (to (Azerbaijan) Khazar Lankaran)
9	FW	AZE	Yasin Abbasov (to (Azerbaijan) Sumgayit)
11	MF	AZE	Agshin Sadygov
15	MF	AZE	Namig Aliyev (to (Azerbaijan) FK Karvan)
17	FW	AZE	Samir Aliyev
20	MF	AZE	Maharram Muslumzade (to (Azerbaijan) Ravan Baku)
25	MF	BUL	Martin Kerchev (to (Albania) Teuta Durrës)
26	MF	GEO	Georgi Chedia (to (Georgia (country)) Metalurgi Rustavi)
27	MF	GEO	Zurab Dzamsashvili (to (Georgia (country)) Chikhura Sachkhere)
28	FW	AZE	Tugay Alhuseynli
—	GK	GER	Goksu Hasancik
—	MF	BRA	Rudison
—	MF	AZE	Jamal Mammadov (to (Azerbaijan) FK Karvan)
—	FW	UKR	Serhiy Artiukh (to (Azerbaijan) Ravan Baku)
—	DF	AZE	Ruslan Namazov (to (Azerbaijan) FK Neftchala)
