= Rahimberdi Baltaýew =

Turkmen footballer

Personal information
- Date of birth: 16 June 1986 (age 40)
- Place of birth: Turkmen SSR, USSR
- Position: Defender

Team information
- Current team: Aşgabat

Senior career*
| Years | Team | Apps | (Gls) |
| 2008–2012 | Aşgabat | | |
| 2013 | Kapaz | 3 | (0) |
| 2013– | Aşgabat | | |

International career^{‡}
| 2012– | Turkmenistan | 5 | (0) |
- * Club domestic league appearances and goals as of 1 November 2017 ‡ National team caps and goals as of 1 November 2017

Rahimberdi Baltayev (Turkmen: Rahimberdi Baltaýew; born 16 June 1986) is a Turkmen footballer who plays for Turkmen club FC Ashgabat. He was part of the Turkmenistan national team from 2012.

== Club career ==
In 2013 played in Azerbaijan Premier League for Kapaz PFK.
