= Andriy Popovych =

Azerbaijani footballer (born 1992)

Personal information
- Full name: Andriy Volodymyrovych Popovych
- Date of birth: 4 March 1992 (age 34)
- Place of birth: Uzhhorod, Ukraine
- Height: 1.91 m (6 ft 3 in)
- Position: Goalkeeper

Youth career
- 2005–2007: Zakarpattia Uzhhorod
- 2008: Metalurh Donetsk

Senior career*
Years	Team	Apps	(Gls)
2008–2011	Baku	0	(0)
2010–2011	→ Absheron (loan)	26	(0)
2011–2012	Sumgayit	29	(0)
2012–2013	Turan Tovuz	15	(0)
2013	Tavşanlı Linyitspor	0	(0)
2014–2015	Sumgayit	29	(0)
2015–2016	Gabala	8	(0)
2016	Polyana	2	(0)
2017–2018	Mynai	13	(0)
2019–2021	Mynai	47	(0)
2021–2023	LNZ Cherkasy	15	(0)
2022	→ Sumgayit (loan)	9	(0)
2023	Feniks Pidmonastyr	0	(0)
2023–2024	Ahrobiznes Volochysk	25	(0)
2024	Khust	2	(0)
2025–2026	Kyrgyzaltyn	16	(0)
2026	Legionovia Legionowo	3	(0)

International career
2008–2009	Azerbaijan U17	6	(0)
2009–2010	Azerbaijan U19	6	(0)
2010–2011	Azerbaijan U21	1	(0)
2011–2012	Azerbaijan	2	(0)
- * Club domestic league appearances and goals as of 08:33, 11 April 2026 (UTC)

Andriy Volodymyrovych Popovych (Azerbaijani: Andrey Vladimiroviç Popoviç; Ukrainian: Андрій Володимирович Попович; born 4 March 1992) is a professional footballer who plays as a goalkeeper. Born in Ukraine, he played for the Azerbaijan national team.

== Club career ==
Andriy Popovych began playing football in Ukraine. He played for Zakarpattia Uzhhorod and Metalurh Donetsk before signing a contract with FC Baku. In 2010, he was a part of Absheron which won the Azerbaijan First Division. In 2011, he signed for Sumgayit FK, followed by a move to Turan Tovuz in 2012. In 2013, Popovych signed with Tavşanlı Linyitspor, but in winter 2014 he returned to Sumgayit.

In June 2015, Popovych signed for Gabala FK. He left Gabala a year later, on 6 June 2016.

On 10 February 2025, it was reported that Popovych signed a one-year contract with Kyrgyz club Kyrgyzaltyn.

== International career ==
Popovych has represented Azerbaijan at all youth levels from under-17 to under-21. On 10 November 2011, he made his senior debut.

== Career statistics ==
=== International ===
Appearances and goals by national team and year
National team	Year	Apps	Goals
Azerbaijan
Azerbaijan	2011	1	0
Azerbaijan	2012	1	0
Total		3	0

== Honours ==
Mynai

- Ukrainian First League: 2019–20
