= Anton Hay =

Ukrainian association football player

Personal information
- Full name: Anton Anatoliyovych Hay
- Date of birth: 25 February 1986 (age 40)
- Place of birth: Zaporizhzhia, Ukrainian SSR, Soviet Union
- Height: 1.81 m (5 ft 11 in)
- Position: Midfielder

Youth career
- 1999–2002: Metalurh Zaporizhzhia

Senior career*
Years	Team	Apps	(Gls)
2002–2008	Metalurh Zaporizhzhia	10	(1)
2002–2006	→ Metalurh-2 Zaporizhzhia	23	(0)
2009	Illichivets Mariupol	1	(0)
2010	Feniks-Illichovets Kalinine	16	(0)
2011	Dnepr Mogilev	6	(0)
2011	Kapaz Ganja	7	(0)
2012	Shakhtar Sverdlovsk	4	(0)

International career
2001	Ukraine-15	1	(0)
2004	Ukraine-18	5	(0)
- * Club domestic league appearances and goals

Anton Anatoliyovych Hay (Ukrainian: Антон Анатолійович Гай; born 25 February 1986) is a retired professional Ukrainian football midfielder.

== Career ==
Hay is a product of Metalurh Zaporizhzhia Youth school system, where he was trained by Mykola Rozdobud'ko. He made his debut for the senior team on 26 October 2005, at a Ukrainian Cup match against FC Veres Rivne. Hay debuted in the Ukrainian Premier League on 10 June 2007, in home match against FC Kharkiv, which Metalurh won 3–1.

== Personal life ==
Anton Hay is a younger brother of Ukrainian international footballer Oleksiy Hay.
