= Samir Yusifov =

Russian footballer (born 1994)

Personal information
- Full name: Samir Sabirovich Yusifov
- Date of birth: 11 February 1994 (age 32)
- Height: 1.77 m (5 ft 9 1/2 in)
- Position: Midfielder

Youth career
- FC Lokomotiv Moscow

Senior career*
Years	Team	Apps	(Gls)
2011–2012	Sumgayit FK	1	(0)
2012–2013	Neftchi Baku PFC	0	(0)
2014–2016	FC Yenisey Krasnoyarsk	12	(0)
2016	FC Oryol	4	(0)
- * Club domestic league appearances and goals

Samir Sabirovich Yusifov (Russian: Самир Сабирович Юсифов; born 11 February 1994) is a Russian former professional football player.

== Club career ==
He made his professional debut on 30 May 2015 for FK Yenisey Krasnoyarsk in a Russian Football National League game against FC Sokol Saratov.

He played for Neftchi Baku PFC in the Azerbaijan Cup.
