= Yuriy Fomenko =

Ukrainian footballer

Personal information
- Full name: Yuriy Serhiyovych Fomenko
- Date of birth: 31 December 1986 (age 39)
- Place of birth: Kotelva, Ukrainian SSR
- Height: 1.80 m (5 ft 11 in)
- Position: Striker

Team information
- Current team: FC Rukh Vynnyky
- Number: 50

Senior career*
Years	Team	Apps	(Gls)
2007	FC Velyka Bahachka	2	(3)
2007–2008	Mykolaiv	33	(2)
2008	Stal Alchevsk	1	(0)
2008–2009	FC Prykarpattya Ivano-Frankivsk	8	(0)
2009–2010	Helios Kharkiv	54	(8)
2010–2013	Kapaz	50	(14)
2013	Inter Baku	12	(5)
2013	AZAL	10	(1)
2015	Šiauliai	6	(2)
2015–2016	Inter Baku	28	(4)
2016–2017	Alashkert	15	(2)
2017	Poltava	3	(0)
2017–	Rukh Vynnyky	1	(0)
- * Club domestic league appearances and goals as of 30 August 2017

Yuriy Fomenko (Ukrainian: Юрій Сергійович Фоменко; born 31 December 1986 in Kotelva, Poltava Oblast, Ukrainian SSR) is a professional Ukrainian football striker who plays for FC Rukh Vynnyky.

Fomenko's first trainer was Ihor Bondarenko. He spent large part of his career as a player in different clubs of the Ukrainian First League and the Ukrainian Second League, then was transferred to Azerbaijan Premier League.

In January 2013 Fomenko joined Inter Baku on a six-month contract. Following six-months at Inter Baku, Fomenko moved to fellow Azerbaijan Premier League side AZAL.

On 1 June 2016, Inter Baku announced that Fomenko had left the club after failing to agree on a new contract.
