= Sidney Kargbo =

Sierra Leonean footballer

Personal information
- Full name: Sidney Kargbo
- Date of birth: July 1, 1986 (age 40)
- Place of birth: Freetown, Sierra Leone
- Height: 1.86 m (6 ft 1 in)
- Position: Central defender

Youth career
- 1999–2002: Sierra Rangers
- 2002–2004: RWD Molenbeek
- 2004–2006: R. Charleroi S.C.

Senior career*
Years	Team	Apps	(Gls)
2006–2008	FC Brussels	42	(3)
2008	FC Inter Turku	3	(0)
2009–2010	K.V. Red Star Waasland	10	(1)
2011–2012	Kapaz PFC	1	(0)

International career
2006	Sierra Leone	1	(0)
- * Club domestic league appearances and goals

Sidney Kargbo (born 1 July 1986 in Freetown) is a Sierra Leonean international footballer who last played for Azerbaijani side Kapaz PFC. He is the younger brother of the Sierra Leone national football team captain Ibrahim Kargbo.

== Early life ==
Kargbo was born and raised in the east end of Freetown, Sierra Leone to Temne parents.

== Career ==
He began his football career with East End Lions in the Sierra Leone National Premier League. Kargbo is commonly known in Sierra Leone by his nickname Pablo Cham. His former teams are Sierra Rangers, Sporting Charleroi. In 2003-2004, Sydney was voted best youth player by the sporting Charleroi fans and joined 2005 to FC Brussels after 42 games in two year was released from FC Brussels. In November 2008, he signed for FC Inter Turku played only one Liigacup match and joined than two months later to K.V. Red Star Waasland.

=== Position ===
He is a central defender/defensive midfielder.

== International career ==
Kargbo plays for the Leone's Star, Sierra Leone senior soccer team. Kargbo made his international debut for Sierra Leone against Mali on September 5, 2006, in Freetown. Since his debut he has been a regular in the Sierra Leone national team.

== Personal life ==
His older brother is Sierra Leonean international defender Ibrahim Kargbo who currently plays for Willem II in the Dutch Eredivisie. Sidney along with his brother Ibrahim Kargbo are the first brothers to play for the Leone Stars (Sierra Leone national team) since the three Kallon brothers (Mohamed Kallon, Kemokai Kallon, Musa Kallon and Kevin Kargbo.
