= Răzvan Țârlea =

Romanian footballer

Personal information
- Full name: Răzvan Casin Țârlea
- Date of birth: 5 August 1979 (age 47)
- Place of birth: Oradea, Romania
- Height: 1.77 m (5 ft 9 1/2 in)
- Position: Left back

Senior career*
| Years | Team | Apps | (Gls) |
| 1999–2000 | Portul Constanța | 5 | (0) |
| 2000 | Farul Constanța | 1 | (0) |
| 2000–2002 | Midia Năvodari | 39 | (2) |
| 2002–2005 | Universitatea Cluj | 61 | (3) |
| 2005–2007 | CFR Cluj | 6 | (0) |
| 2007 | Politehnica Iași | 5 | (0) |
| 2007–2009 | Petrolul Ploiești | 21 | (0) |
| 2009–2011 | Gabala | 46 | (1) |
| 2011–2012 | Kəpəz | 4 | (0) |
| 2016–2018 | Dacia Gepiu | 9 | (0) |
| 2019 | Olimpia Salonta | 15 | (1) |
| Total | | 212 | (7) |
- * Club domestic league appearances and goals as of 12:03, 14 July 2023 (UTC)

Răzvan Casin Țârlea (born 5 August 1979) is a Romanian former footballer who played for teams such as Universitatea Cluj, Petrolul Ploiești or Gabala, among others.

== Career ==
Țârlea's youth career started during the late 1990s at CSȘ Bihorul, a team from his hometown of Oradea.

He made his senior debut for Portul Constanța, but then was picked up by Farul Constanța. He had an unsuccessful stay, playing only one game. After that, he switched to Midia Năvodari in the second-highest Romanian league, where he played for 2 seasons and appeared in 39 matches, scoring two goals. Later Țârlea would go on to play for Universitatea Cluj for four seasons, helping to get the team promoted from the third-highest to the second-highest league.

He played 61 games and scored 3 goals and during the winter of 2005–2006, he transferred to city rivals CFR in the Liga 1, the top division of Romania. He failed to win a place in the starting eleven and, after six matches in one-year and a half, he moved to Politehnica Iași for a short period before joining Petrolul Ploiești. On 17 August 2009, Țârlea signed an initial one-year contract with Azerbaijani club Gabala FC.

== Career statistics ==
As of 16 August 2013

| Club performance | | | League | | Cup | | Continental | | Total | |
| Season | Club | League | Apps | Goals | Apps | Goals | Apps | Goals | Apps | Goals |
| Romania | | | League | | Cupa României | | Europe | | Total | |
|---|---|---|---|---|---|---|---|---|---|---|
| 1999–2000 | Portul Constanța | Liga III | | | | | - | | | |
| 1999–2000 | Farul Constanța | Liga I | 1 | 0 | | | - | | 1 | 0 |
| 2000–01 | Midia Năvodari | Liga II | 22 | 1 | | | - | | 22 | 1 |
| 2001–02 | Midia Năvodari | Liga II | 17 | 1 | | | - | | 17 | 1 |
| 2002–03 | Universitatea Cluj | Liga III | | | | | - | | | |
| 2003–04 | Universitatea Cluj | Liga II | 25 | 0 | | | - | | 25 | 0 |
| 2004–05 | Universitatea Cluj | Liga II | 24 | 3 | | | - | | 24 | 3 |
| 2005–06 | Universitatea Cluj | Liga II | 12 | 0 | | | - | | 12 | 0 |
| 2005–06 | CFR Cluj | Liga I | 5 | 0 | | | - | | 5 | 0 |
| 2006–07 | CFR Cluj | Liga I | 1 | 0 | | | - | | 1 | 0 |
| 2006–07 | Politehnica Iași | Liga I | 5 | 0 | | | - | | 5 | 0 |
| 2007–08 | Petrolul Ploiești | Liga II | 21 | 0 | | | - | | 21 | 0 |
| Azerbaijan | | | League | | Azerbaijan Cup | | Europe | | Total | |
| 2009–10 | Gabala | Azerbaijan Premier League | 25 | 1 | | | - | | 25 | 1 |
| 2010–11 | Gabala | Azerbaijan Premier League | 21 | 0 | 3 | 0 | - | | 24 | 0 |
| 2011–12 | Kəpəz | Azerbaijan Premier League | 4 | 0 | 0 | 0 | - | | 4 | 0 |
| Total | Romania | | 133 | 5 | | | — | | 133 | 5 |
| Total | Azerbaijan | | 50 | 1 | 3 | 0 | — | | 53 | 1 |
| Career total | | | 183 | 6 | 3 | 0 | — | | 186 | 6 |
