= Nikolai Svezhintsev =

Russian footballer

Personal information
- Full name: Nikolai Nikolayevich Svezhintsev
- Date of birth: 7 July 1983 (age 43)
- Place of birth: Valuyki, Belgorod Oblast, Russian SFSR
- Height: 1.80 m (5 ft 11 in)
- Position: Defender

Youth career
- 2000–2001: Spartak Moscow

Senior career*
| Years | Team | Apps | (Gls) |
| 2001 | Spartak Moscow | 0 | (0) |
| 2002 | Mostransgaz Gazoprovod | 15 | (0) |
| 2003 | Dinamo Minsk | 3 | (0) |
| 2004–2006 | Baltika Kaliningrad | 20 | (0) |
| 2006 | → Baltika-2 Kaliningrad | 28 | (1) |
| 2007 | Lukhovitsy | 13 | (1) |
| 2008–2010 | Rusichi Oryol | 39 | (0) |
| 2011–2013 | Kapaz | 49 | (1) |
- * Club domestic league appearances and goals

Nikolai Nikolayevich Svezhintsev (Russian: Николай Николаевич Свежинцев; born 7 July 1983) is a former Russian professional footballer.

== Club career ==
He played in the Russian Football National League for FC Baltika Kaliningrad in 2004.

== Honors ==
- Belarusian Premier League bronze: 2003.
