= Ganja City Stadium =

Football stadium in Azerbaijan

Coordinates: 40°42′22″N 46°21′43″E

- UEFA
- Interactive map of Ganja City Stadium
- Location: Ganja, Azerbaijan
- Owner: Kapaz
- Capacity: 15,343
- Surface: Grass

Construction
- Built: 1960
- Opened: 1963
- Renovated: 2025

Tenant
- Kapaz

Ganja City Stadium is located in Ganja, Azerbaijan. It is used by the Kapaz football club and has a capacity of 15,343. In the 2016-17 domestic league season, tenants Kapaz PFK drew the highest average home attendance (21,096).

During the summer of 2017, the pitch at the Ganja City Stadium was relaid, with work being completed in October 2017.

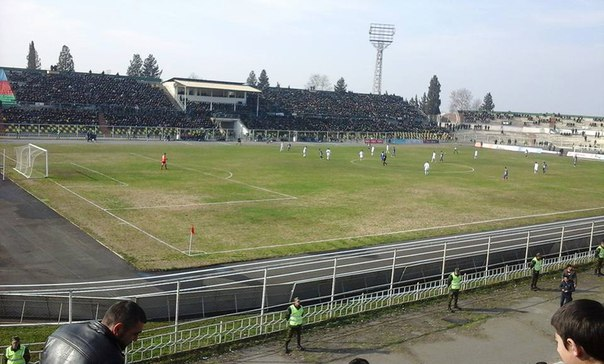
Kapaz-Neftchi game in 2016

== Sport events ==
2025 CIS Games

== Access and transportation ==
Train or bus from Baku to Ganja City Stadium. The best way to get from Baku to Ganja City Stadium is to take a train, which takes 4h 17m and costs $6 - $13.

Ganja City New Stadium, September 2025

New Ganja Stadium exterior

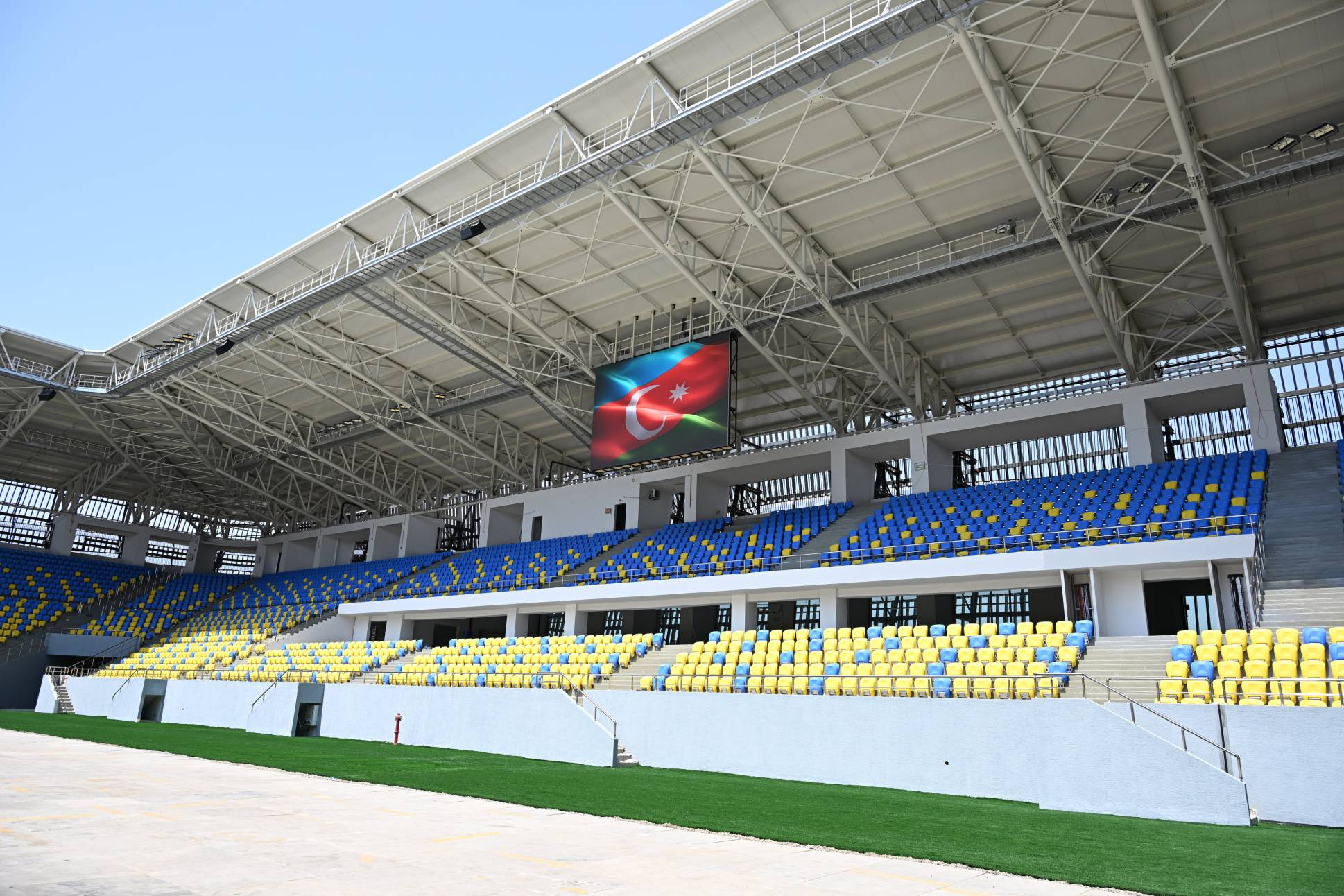
Ganja New Stadium Interior
