= Azer Mammadov =

Azerbaijani footballer (born 1976)

Personal information
- Date of birth: 7 February 1976 (age 50)
- Place of birth: Kirovabad, Azerbaijani SSR, Soviet Union
- Height: 1.78 m (5 ft 10 in)
- Position: Defender

Senior career*
Years	Team	Apps	(Gls)
1992–1994	Kapaz	26	(1)
1994–1995	Khazri Buzovna	21	(0)
1995–1996	Kapaz	32	(6)
1996–1997	MOIK Baku	17	(0)
1997–1999	Kapaz	44	(5)
1999–2004	FK Shamkir	84	(4)
2004–2005	Turan Tovuz	31	(2)
2005	Kapaz	13	(0)
2006–2009	Qarabağ	46	(0)
2009–2010	Gabala	3	(0)
2010–2013	Kapaz	71	(0)

International career^{‡}
2001–2006	Azerbaijan	12	(0)
- * Club domestic league appearances and goals as of 21 August 2013 ‡ National team caps and goals as of December 2009

Azer Mammadov (Azerbaijani: Azər Məmmədov; born 7 February 1976 in Kirovabad) is an Azerbaijani footballer (defender) who retired in 2013, his last club was FC Kapaz. He is also a former member of the Azerbaijan national football team who made 12 appearances from 2001 to 2006.

== Career ==
In August 2009 Mammadov moved from Qarabağ to Gabala.

== Career statistics ==
Club performance			League		Cup		Continental		Total	
Season	Club	League	Apps	Goals	Apps	Goals	Apps	Goals	Apps	Goals
1992	Kapaz	Azerbaijan Top League	3	0			—		3	0
1993	Kapaz	Azerbaijan Top League	8	1			—		8	1
1993–94	Kapaz	Azerbaijan Top League	15	0			—		15	0
1994–95	Khazri Buzovna	Azerbaijan Top League	21	0			—		21	0
1995–96	Kapaz	Azerbaijan Top League	27	5			0	0	27	5
1996–97	Kapaz	Azerbaijan Top League	5	1			—		5	1
1996–97	MOIK Baku	Azerbaijan Top League	14	0			—		14	0
1997–98	MOIK Baku	Azerbaijan Top League	3	0			—		3	0
1997–98	Kapaz	Azerbaijan Top League	9	0			—		9	0
1998–99	Kapaz	Azerbaijan Top League	35	5			0	0	35	5
1999–2000	Shamkir	Azerbaijan Top League	19	0			2	0	21	0
2000–01	Shamkir	Azerbaijan Top League	19	2			3	0	22	2
2001–02	Shamkir	Azerbaijan Top League	22	0			2	0	24	0
2002–03	no league championship was held		-		-		-		0	0
2003–04	Shamkir	Azerbaijan Top League	24	2			—		24	2
2004–05	Turan Tovuz	Azerbaijan Top League	31	2			—		31	2
2005–06	Kapaz	Azerbaijan Top League	13	0			—		13	0
2005–06	Qarabağ	Azerbaijan Top League	13	0			—		13	0
2006–07	Qarabağ	Azerbaijan Top League	5	0			1	0	6	0
2007–08	Qarabağ	Azerbaijan Premier League	18	0			—		18	0
2008–09	Qarabağ	Azerbaijan Premier League	10	0			—		10	0
2009–10	Gabala	Azerbaijan Premier League	3	0			—		3	0
2010–11	Kapaz	Azerbaijan Premier League	30	0	1	0	—		31	0
2011–12	Kapaz	Azerbaijan Premier League	27	0	2	0	—		29	0
2012–13	Kapaz	Azerbaijan Premier League	14	0	2	0	—		16	0
Total	Azerbaijan		388	18	4	0	8	0	400	18
Career total			388	18	4	0	8	0	400	18

== National team statistics ==
Azerbaijan national team
Year	Apps	Goals
2001	4	0
2002	5	0
2003	0	0
2004	0	0
2005	0	0
2006	3	0
Total	12	0
