= Mahmud Qurbanov =

Azerbaijani footballer (born 1973)

Mahmud Gurbanov
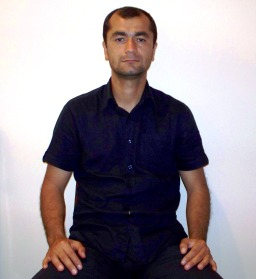

Personal information
- Full name: Mahmud Xanlar oğlu Qurbanov
- Date of birth: 10 May 1973 (age 53)
- Place of birth: Ganja, Soviet Union
- Height: 1.77 m (5 ft 10 in)
- Position: Midfielder

Team information
- Current team: Sabail (manager)

Senior career*
Years	Team	Apps	(Gls)
1993–1996	FC Kapaz	110	(22)
1996–1997	Neftchi Baku reserves	23	(3)
1997–2000	FC Kapaz	58	(10)
2000–2002	FK Shamkir	63	(16)
2002–2003	Foolad F.C.	20	(4)
2003–2004	Tavriya Simferpol	12	(0)
2004–2005	Neftchi Baku	36	(3)
2005–2007	Khazar Lankaran	49	(3)
2007–2008	Inter Baku	27	(4)
2008–2011	FK Baku	38	(0)
2011–2012	Sumgayit FC	17	(1)
Total		453	(66)

International career^{‡}
1994–2008	Azerbaijan	70	(1)

Managerial career
- 2012: Taraggi
- 2012–2013: Kəpəz
- 2013–: Azerbaijan (assistant)
- 2014: Azerbaijan (caretaker)
- 2015–2016: Azerbaijan U18
- 2015–2017: Azerbaijan (assistant)
- 2018–2022: Neftçi-2
- 2022: Sabail
- * Club domestic league appearances and goals as of 20 May 2012 ‡ National team caps and goals as of 1 December 2009

Makhmud Gurbanov (Azerbaijani: Mahmud Qurbanov; born 10 May 1973) is a football midfielder from Azerbaijan. He has won Azerbaijani championship record 12 times with six different teams.

He started his career in FC Kapaz, and has since played for PFC Neftchi, Kapaz (second spell) and FK Shamkir before he played abroad with Iranian team Foolad FC and Ukrainian team FC Tavriya Simferopol. He later rejoined PFC Neftchi. He then signed with FC Inter Baku, where he played until he joined Sumgayit FC.

== National team statistics ==
Azerbaijan national team
Year	Apps	Goals
1994	3	0
1995	3	0
1996	1	0
1997	5	0
1998	4	0
1999	6	0
2000	5	0
2001	9	0
2002	9	0
2003	8	0
2004	8	0
2005	2	0
2006	0	0
2007	2	1
2008	5	0
Total	70	1

== International Goals ==
#	Date	Venue	Opponent	Score	Result	Competition
1.	17 November 2007	Helsinki Olympic Stadium	Finland	0–1	2–1	Euro 2008 qualification

== Honours ==
=== Individual ===
- Azerbaijani Footballer of the Year (1): 2007.
