= Kapaz PFK =

Kapaz
- Full name: Kapaz Professional Football Club
- Nickname: Dağlılar (The Mountaineers)
- Founded: 1959; 67 years ago
- Ground: Ganja City Stadium, Ganja, Azerbaijan
- Capacity: 15.343
- President: Anar Abdullayev
- Manager: Azer Mammadov
- League: Azerbaijan Premier League
- 2025–26: 10th of 12
- Website: kapazpfc.az
Home colours	Away colours

Kapaz PFK (Azerbaijani: Kəpəz Peşəkar Futbol Klubu, pronounced [cæˈpæz]), is an Azerbaijani football club based in Ganja, which competes in the Azerbaijan Premier League, the highest tier of Azerbaijan football. The club was founded as Toxucu in 1959. They have won the Azerbaijani Championship 3 times and the Azerbaijani Football Cup 4 times.

The team's colours are yellow and blue. The club plays at Ganja City Stadium which has a capacity of 15.343.

== History ==
=== Soviet era (1959–1991) ===
Kapaz PFC was founded in 1959 as Toxucu and played in the Soviet First League. However, the team was promoted to the Soviet Top League in 1968 as Dinamo Kirovobad after finishing first in the Soviet First League the previous season. The club has been known as Taraggi and Toxucu during its history; however, it became famous in more modern times as Kapaz when it was renamed in 1982.

=== Post-Soviet era (1993–1999) ===
In 1991, the club was once again renamed as Kapaz after Azerbaijan's independence from the Soviet Union and won the Azerbaijan Premier League title three times. At the end of the 1997–98 season, Kapaz finished the season unbeaten. Out of 26 games, the club's final record for the 1997–1998 league campaign stood at 22 wins, 4 draws, and 0 losses. To date this has not been matched by any team in a single season in an Azerbaijani league division.

Kapaz PFC remained the only team to win the league undefeated, and, for ten months until 23 September 1998, opponents could not even take a point off them. Two of the 22 matches were technical victories awarded to Kapaz.

=== Financial struggles (2002–present) ===
Kapaz, one of the most prominent football clubs in Azerbaijan, entered financial difficulties during the late 2000s. Since 2002, the club has found itself slipping further and further down the table, which has been influenced by financial difficulties. The financial collapse of Kapaz resulted in a great deal of discussion within Azerbaijani football. Major Azerbaijani companies, reportedly "concerned at the current uncertainty about the club's future and its backers" declined to provide Kapaz with the corporate banking facilities it needed.

In 2005, the club's new owners decided to rename the club Ganja despite facing criticism from the club's fans. In 2007, the club was excluded from the Azerbaijan Premier League due to financial struggles. However, after help from the AFFA and local communities, the club participated in the Azerbaijan First Division during the 2009–10 season. In 2010, they became champions of the Azerbaijan First Division finishing the season with 47 points and being promoted to the Azerbaijan Premier League. In 2011, it was decided that the club's name would be changed back to its old name of Kapaz PFC.

In April 2013, Kapaz was relegated to the Azerbaijan First Division. The ended the season in 12th place in the Azerbaijan Premier League, the club's lowest ever league finish. The club's financial situation didn't improve, which caused plenty of players to leave the club.

On 18 November 2017, Shahin Diniyev resigned as manager with Yunis Hüseynov being appointed as his replacement on 20 November 2017.

For the 2022/23 Azerbaijani Premier League season, an expansion of the league to 10 teams was implemented. As there are only five independent football clubs in the first division, and FK Zaqatala, Qaradag Lokbatan, and MOIK Baku declined to play in the Premier League for financial reasons, Kapaz and Turan Tovuz were promoted for next season.

=== League and cup history ===
Season	Div.	Pos.	Pl.	W	D	L	GS	GA	P	Domestic Cup
1992	1st	5th	36	23	8	5	98	29	54	1/8 Finals
1993	1st	4th	18	13	4	1	48	13	30	First round
1993–94	1st	3rd	30	20	7	3	74	25	47	Winners
1994–95	1st	1st	24	19	4	1	71	19	42	Semi-finals
1995–96	1st	3rd	20	9	5	6	34	21	32	Quarter-finals
1996–97	1st	5th	30	18	4	8	59	26	58	Winners
1997–98	1st	1st	26	22	4	0	67	10	70	Winners
1998–99	1st	1st	36	26	5	5	94	24	83	Quarter-finals
1999–00	1st	2nd	22	14	2	6	46	24	44	Winners
2000–01	1st	8th	20	8	1	11	34	29	25	Quarter-finals
2001–02	1st	5th	32	14	5	13	51	50	47	Semi-finals
2003–04	1st	11th	26	6	5	15	22	45	23	Quarter-finals
2004–05	1st	9th	34	11	9	14	37	37	42	1/8 Finals
2005–06	1st	10th	26	7	7	12	35	46	28	1/8 Finals
2009–10	2nd	1st	22	4	5	3	51	15	47	1/8 Finals
2010–11	1st	9th	32	8	12	12	33	37	36	1/8 Finals
2011–12	1st	10th	32	9	5	18	35	55	32	Quarter-finals
2012–13	1st	12th	32	5	4	23	22	64	19	1/8 Finals
2013–14	2nd	13th	30	7	4	19	29	37	25	Second round
2014–15	2nd	9th	30	10	8	12	37	37	38	did not enter
2015–16	1st	5th	36	15	11	10	48	40	56	Second round
2016–17	1st	5th	28	9	9	10	24	27	36	Quarter-finals
2017–18	1st	8th	28	3	5	20	18	47	14	Quarter-finals
2018–19	2nd	11th	26	5	7	14	21	40	22	First round
2019–20	2nd	8	12	5	3	4	14	13	18	First round
2020–21	2nd	8	27	7	7	13	30	38	28	Quarterfinal
2021–22	2nd	6	24	9	9	6	35	31	36	First round
2022-23	1st	8	36	6	13	17	34	62	31	Quarterfinal

=== European history ===
As of match played 20 July 2016

Competition	Pld	W	D	L	GF	GA	±
UEFA Cup / UEFA Europa League	8	1	1	6	2	19	–17
UEFA Cup Winners' Cup	2	0	0	2	0	2	–2
UEFA Champions League	4	1	0	3	4	9	–5
Total	14	2	1	11	6	30	–24

Season	Competition	Round	Club	Home	Away	Aggregate
1995–96	UEFA Cup	PR	Austria Wien	0–4	1–5	1–9
1997–98	UEFA Cup Winners' Cup	1Q	(Latvia) Dinaburg Daugavpils	0–1	0–1	0–2
1998–99	UEFA Champions League	1Q	(Poland) ŁKS Łódź	1–3	1–4	2–7
1999–00	UEFA Champions League	1Q	(North Macedonia) Sloga Jugomagnat	2–1	0–1	2–2
2000–01	UEFA Cup	1Q	(Turkey) Antalyaspor	0–2	0–5	0–7
2016–17	UEFA Europa League	1Q	(Moldova) Dacia Chișinău	0–0	1–0	1–0
2016–17	UEFA Europa League	2Q	(Austria) Admira Wacker	0–2	0–1	0–3

== Supporters ==
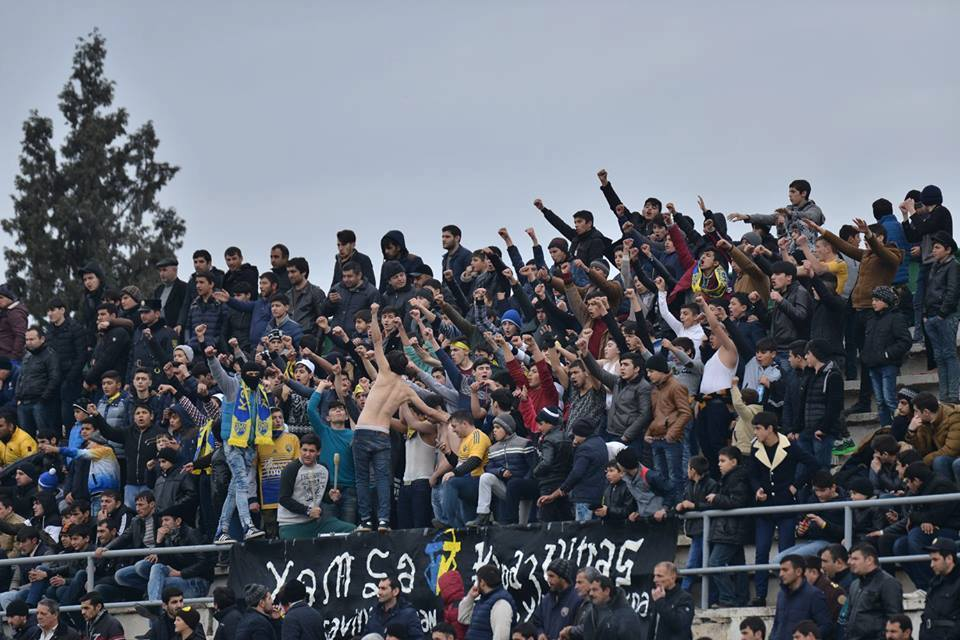
Khamsa Supporters Club

The club have one of the biggest number of supporters in Azerbaijan alongside Neftçi, Khazar Lankaran and Qarabağ. Amongst all Azerbaijani professional football clubs, Kapaz PFC have the highest average fan attendance at their home games. According to official statistics for the first half of 2015–16 season, Kapaz PFC ranked first in fan attendance at nearly 15,000 fans per home game. This was almost triple that of their nearest rival.

The 2015–16 seasons attendance record was set in Ganja, as 20,400 Kapaz fans attended home game against Qarabag FC on February 14, 2016 The fanbase is large and generally loyal and like most major Azerbaijani football clubs, Kapaz have a number of domestic supporters' clubs, including the Khamsa Supporters Club, which works closely with the club and maintains a more independent line. The club's most popular celebrity supporters are the likes of Olympic wrestling champion Toghrul Asgarov.

== Shirt sponsors and kit manufacturers ==
Years	Manufacturer	Sponsor
2010 – 2013	(Germany) Adidas	(Azerbaijan) Nakhchivan Automobile Plant
2013 – 2016	(Germany) Adidas	(Azerbaijan) Gəncə 4000
2016 – 2017	(England) Umbro	(Azerbaijan) Gəncə 4000
2017 – 2018	(United States) Nike	(Azerbaijan) Gəncə 4000
2018 – 2022	(Italy) Givova	
2022 –	(Spain) Joma	

== Honours ==
=== Azerbaijan ===
- Azerbaijan League
  - Champions (3): 1994–95, 1997–98, 1998–99
  - Runners–up (1): 1999–00
- Azerbaijan Cup
  - Winners (4): 1993–94, 1996–97, 1997–98, 1999–00
- Azerbaijan First Division
  - Champions (1): 2009–10

=== USSR ===
- Soviet First League
  - Champions (1): 1967
- Soviet Second League
  - Champions (1): 1965
  - Runners–up (1): 1986
- Soviet Cup
  - Quarter-finalist (1): 1962

== Players ==
For a list of all former and current Kapaz PFC players with a Wikipedia article, see.

Azerbaijani teams are limited to nine players without Azerbaijani citizenship. The squad list includes only the principal nationality of each player; several non-European players on the squad have dual citizenship with an EU country.

=== Current squad ===
As of 13 September 2026

Note: Flags indicate national team as defined under FIFA eligibility rules; some limited exceptions apply. Players may hold more than one non-FIFA nationality.

No.	Pos.	Nation	Player
1	GK	POR	Rogério
2	DF	AZE	Arzu Atakishiyev
3	MF	MLI	Mahamadou Ba
4	DF	GEO	Mate Abuladze
5	DF	AZE	Hüseyn Babayev
6	MF	AZE	Vadim Abdullayev
7	MF	AZE	Namiq Ələsgərov
8	MF	AZE	Şakir Seyidov
9	FW	ZAM	Kenneth Kalunga
10	MF	AZE	Rahman Hajiyev
11	MF	MDA	Viktor Stina
14	DF	BFA	Adama Fofana
15	FW	AZE	Cavad Karimov
17	DF	AZE	Umid Samadov
20	DF	AZE	Rafael Maharramli

No.	Pos.	Nation	Player
21	FW	POR	Asumah Abubakar
23	MF	AZE	Raul Isaqov
27	MF	BEL	Desmond Acquah
29	DF	POR	Diogo Verdasca
33	FW	NGR	Benito
34	DF	AZE	Ürfan Abbasov
55	MF	CIV	Donald Dongo
66	DF	KOS	David Domgjoni
70	MF	AZE	Shahnur Ismayilov
77	MF	AZE	Nicat Mammadov
81	GK	AZE	Elgün Bayramov
94	GK	AZE	Rashad Azizli
99	MF	AZE	Ali Samadov
—	DF	AZE	Magsad Isayev

=== Out on loan ===
Note: Flags indicate national team as defined under FIFA eligibility rules; some limited exceptions apply. Players may hold more than one non-FIFA nationality.

No.	Pos.	Nation	Player

== Managers ==
=== Managers in Soviet League ===
- (Soviet Union) (Georgia (country)) Isay Abramashvili
- (Soviet Union) (Azerbaijan) Sabir Mammadov

=== Managers in modern history ===
- (Azerbaijan) Şahmir Huseynov (1992)
- (Azerbaijan) Mubariz Zeynalov (1993)
- (Azerbaijan) Mehman Allahverdiyev (1993–2003)
- (Azerbaijan) Fuad Ismayilov (2003–2004)
- (Azerbaijan) Arzu Mirzayev (2003)
- (Azerbaijan) Shahin Diniyev (2005–06)
- (Azerbaijan) Fuad Ismayilov (2006)
- (Azerbaijan) Mehman Allahverdiyev (2011)
- (Azerbaijan) Mirbaghir Isayev (2011)
- (Azerbaijan) Fuad Ismayilov (2011–2012)
- (Azerbaijan) Mahmud Gurbanov (2012–2013)
- (Azerbaijan) Vidadi Rzayev (2013–2015)
- (Azerbaijan) Shahin Diniyev (2015–2017)
- (Azerbaijan) Yunis Huseynov (2017–2018)
- (Azerbaijan) Etibar Ibrahimov (2018–2019)
- (Azerbaijan) Yashar Vahabzade (2019–2022)
- (Azerbaijan) Tarlan Ahmadov (2022–2023)
- (Azerbaijan) Adil Shukurov (2023–2024)
- (Azerbaijan) Azer Baghirov (2024–2025)
- (Azerbaijan) Adil Shukurov (2025-present)

=== Anniversary goals in the Azerbaijan Championship ===
On September 2, 2024, during their 651st match, "Kapaz" scored their 1000th goal in the Azerbaijani championships. This goal came in the 5th round of the 2024/2025 Azerbaijan Premier League season, in a match against "Sabah" held at the Tovuz City Stadium. The goal was scored by Viktor Braga. In the same match, "Kapaz" also scored their 1001st goal, but the game ended with a 2:3 victory for "Sabah." With this goal, "Kapaz" became the third team in Azerbaijani championship history to score 1000 or more goals, joining "Qarabağ" and "Neftçi".
