= List of Azerbaijan football transfers summer 2011 =

This is a list of Azerbaijan football transfers in the summer transfer window 2011 by club. Only clubs of the 2011–12 Azerbaijan Premier League are included.

== Azerbaijan Premier League 2011-12 ==
=== AZAL Baku ===
In: Note: Flags indicate national team as defined under FIFA eligibility rules; some limited exceptions apply. Players may hold more than one non-FIFA nationality.

No.	Pos.	Nation	Player
1	GK	AZE	Amil Agajanov (from (Azerbaijan) Mughan)
6	DF	LTU	Mindaugas Daunoravičius (from (Lithuania) Tauras)
8	FW	AZE	Elshan Mammadov (from (Azerbaijan) Mughan)
15	FW	MDA	Gheorghe Boghiu (from (Moldova) Milsami)
16	DF	SRB	Branislav Arsenijević (from (Bosnia and Herzegovina) Sarajevo)
23	FW	BRA	Tales Schutz (from (Hong Kong) South China AA)
25	FW	ARG	Christian Ruiz (from (Bolivia) The Strongest)
88	MF	ALB	Ervin Bulku (from (Croatia) Hajduk Split)
25	DF	AZE	Tural Narimanov (on loan from (Azerbaijan) Neftchi Baku)
13	DF	AZE	Shahriyar Rahimov (on loan from (Azerbaijan) Inter Baku)

Out: Note: Flags indicate national team as defined under FIFA eligibility rules; some limited exceptions apply. Players may hold more than one non-FIFA nationality.

No.	Pos.	Nation	Player
—	DF	AZE	Elvin Aliyev (to (Azerbaijan) FK Baku)
—	GK	AZE	Elshan Poladov (to (Azerbaijan) FC Kəpəz)
—	MF	AZE	Anar Hasanov (to (Azerbaijan) FK Karvan)
—	MF	NGR	Pius Ikedia (to (Northern Cyprus) Mağusa Türk Gücü)
—	FW	ALB	Eleandro Pema (to (Albania) KS Kamza)
—	MF	SRB	Mirko Bunjevčević (to (Serbia) Zemun)
—	MF	SRB	Dragan Mandić (retired)
—	FW	BUL	Enyo Krastovchev (to (Azerbaijan) Inter Baku)
—	FW	BLR	Gennadi Bliznyuk (to (Belarus) Belshina)
—	DF	LAT	Ritus Krjauklis (to (Latvia) FK Liepājas Metalurgs)
—	FW	LTU	Gvidas Juska (to (Lithuania) Banga)

=== Baku ===
In: Note: Flags indicate national team as defined under FIFA eligibility rules; some limited exceptions apply. Players may hold more than one non-FIFA nationality.

No.	Pos.	Nation	Player
3	DF	LAT	Deniss Ivanovs (from (Turkey) Sivasspor)
7	MF	LTU	Deividas Česnauskis (from (Greece) Aris)
8	MF	BRA	Juninho (from (Slovenia) Domžale)
9	FW	LAT	Māris Verpakovskis (from (Ukraine) Dynamo Kyiv)
11	MF	AZE	Elvin Mammadov (from (Azerbaijan) FK Qarabağ)
14	DF	AZE	Elvin Aliyev (from (Azerbaijan) AZAL Baku)
21	DF	AZE	Novruz Mammadov (from (Azerbaijan) Mughan)
36	FW	CRC	Winston Parks (from (Romania) Politehnica Timișoara)

Out: Note: Flags indicate national team as defined under FIFA eligibility rules; some limited exceptions apply. Players may hold more than one non-FIFA nationality.

No.	Pos.	Nation	Player
3	DF	AZE	Rafael Amirbekov
5	DF	FRA	Stéphane Borbiconi (loan return to (France) Metz)
7	MF	AZE	Mahmud Qurbanov (to (Azerbaijan) Sumgayit City)
8	MF	CRO	Ernad Skulić (to (Croatia) Inter Zaprešić)
9	FW	AZE	Vagif Javadov (loan return to (Netherlands) Twente)
11	MF	MAR	Adnan Barakat (to (Thailand) Muangthong United)
12	FW	MDA	Veaceslav Sofroni (to (Moldova) Costuleni)
18	DF	BUL	Radomir Todorov (to (Bulgaria) Spartak Varna)
27	MF	AZE	Bakhtiyar Soltanov (to (Azerbaijan) Qarabağ)
55	MF	BRA	Juninho (to (Brazil) Ferroviária)
99	MF	BRA	Leonardo da Silva Rocha (to (Azerbaijan) Qarabağ)
—	DF	AZE	Haji Ahmadov (on loan to (Azerbaijan) Sumgayit City)

=== Gabala ===
In: Note: Flags indicate national team as defined under FIFA eligibility rules; some limited exceptions apply. Players may hold more than one non-FIFA nationality.

No.	Pos.	Nation	Player
3	DF	AZE	Vurğun Hüseynov (from (Azerbaijan) Turan Tovuz)
4	DF	AZE	Mahir Shukurov (from (Russia) Anzhi)
9	FW	SEN	Victor Mendy (from (Turkey) Bucaspor)
14	MF	SRB	Veseljko Trivunović (from (Serbia) Vojvodina)
18	MF	AZE	Aleksandr Chertoganov (from (Azerbaijan) Inter Baku)
19	MF	AZE	Rovshan Amiraslanov (from (Azerbaijan) Inter Baku)
26	DF	BRA	Daniel Lopez Cruz (from (Portugal) Naval)
30	GK	SCO	Graeme Smith (from (Scotland) Hibernian)
34	DF	AZE	Urfan Abbasov (from (Azerbaijan) Qarabağ)
77	FW	BRA	Dodô (from (Croatia) Lokomotiva Zagreb)
11	FW	CIV	Serge Djiehoua (from (Turkey) Antalyaspor)

Out: Note: Flags indicate national team as defined under FIFA eligibility rules; some limited exceptions apply. Players may hold more than one non-FIFA nationality.

No.	Pos.	Nation	Player
4	DF	AZE	Ramin Guliyev
9	MF	BRA	Bruno dos Anjos (to (Brazil) Atlético Monte Azul)
11	MF	ENG	Terry Cooke (retired)
11	FW	NED	Collins John (to (Iran) Mes Sarcheshmeh)
14	DF	SRB	Milan Antić (to (Azerbaijan) FC Kəpəz)
15	DF	ROU	Răzvan Ţârlea (to (Azerbaijan) FC Kəpəz)
18	MF	GEO	Goga Beraia (to (Georgia (country)) Dinamo Tbilisi)
19	FW	AZE	Branimir Subašić (to (Azerbaijan) Khazar Lankaran)
20	MF	ARG	Cristian Torres (to (Azerbaijan) Ravan Baku)
21	MF	SLE	Alhassan Bangura (to (England) Forest Green Rovers)
26	MF	AZE	Namig Aliyev (to (Azerbaijan) Turan Tovuz)
30	GK	AZE	Anar Nazirov (to (Azerbaijan) Turan Tovuz)

=== Inter Baku ===
In: Note: Flags indicate national team as defined under FIFA eligibility rules; some limited exceptions apply. Players may hold more than one non-FIFA nationality.

No.	Pos.	Nation	Player
2	DF	AZE	Khayal Mustafayev (from (Azerbaijan) FC Kəpəz)
5	DF	AZE	Rustam Abbasov (from (Russia) FC Tolyatti)
6	MF	AZE	Samir Zargarov (from (Azerbaijan) FC Kəpəz)
7	DF	AZE	Ruslan Poladov (from (Azerbaijan) Khazar Lankaran)
9	FW	BUL	Enyo Krastovchev (from (Azerbaijan) AZAL Baku)
11	MF	AZE	Asif Mammadov (from (Azerbaijan) Khazar Lankaran)
22	DF	SVK	Peter Chrappan (from (Austria) Mattersburg)

Out: Note: Flags indicate national team as defined under FIFA eligibility rules; some limited exceptions apply. Players may hold more than one non-FIFA nationality.

No.	Pos.	Nation	Player
5	DF	BUL	Zhivko Zhelev (to (Bulgaria) Slavia Sofia)
6	MF	EST	Dmitri Kruglov (to (Russia) Rostov)
8	MF	AZE	Aleksandr Chertoganov (to (Azerbaijan) Gabala)
10	MF	AZE	Jamal Mammadov (to (Azerbaijan) Turan Tovuz)
12	MF	MKD	Filip Despotovski (to (North Macedonia) Rabotnički)
19	MF	GEO	David Odikadze (to (Georgia (country)) Dinamo Tbilisi)
32	FW	LTU	Robertas Poškus (to (Azerbaijan) Simurq)
77	MF	BUL	Daniel Genov (on loan to (Azerbaijan) Simurq)
88	DF	GEO	Kakhaber Mzhavanadze
—	MF	AZE	Tofig Mikayilov (on loan to (Azerbaijan) Simurq)
—	FW	AZE	Ali Bagirov (on loan to (Azerbaijan) Simurq)
—	MF	AZE	Rovshan Amiraslanov (to (Azerbaijan) Gabala)
—	MF	AZE	Aleksandr Gross (on loan to (Azerbaijan) Sumgayit City)
—	MF	BRA	Mario Sergio Aumarante Santana
—	FW	AZE	Sabuhi Ismayilov (to (Azerbaijan) MOIK Baku)

=== Kəpəz ===
In: Note: Flags indicate national team as defined under FIFA eligibility rules; some limited exceptions apply. Players may hold more than one non-FIFA nationality.

No.	Pos.	Nation	Player
5	DF	TUR	Muammer Erdoğdu (from (Azerbaijan) Turan Tovuz)
6	MF	AZE	Vasif Aliyev (from (Azerbaijan) Simurq)
6	DF	SLE	Sidney Kargbo (from (Belgium) K.V. Red Star Waasland)
7	MF	AZE	Asaf Qädiri (to (Azerbaijan) Turan Tovuz)
9	MF	AZE	Khayal Garayev (from (Azerbaijan) Turan Tovuz)
14	MF	BLR	Dmitri Parkhachev (from (Kazakhstan) Zhetysu)
18	MF	RUS	Nikolay Svezhentsev (from (Russia) Rusichi Oryol)
19	MF	AZE	Zaur Asadov (from (Azerbaijan) Mughan)
22	GK	RUS	Konstantin Kolesnikov (from (Russia) Olimpia Gelendzhik)
25	MF	UKR	Anton Hay (from (Belarus) Dnepr Mogilev)
30	FW	UKR	Yuriy Fomenko (from (Ukraine) FC Helios Kharkiv)
34	DF	AZE	Javad Mirzayev (from (Azerbaijan) Mughan)
88	GK	AZE	Elshan Poladov (from (Azerbaijan) AZAL Baku)
—	DF	ROU	Răzvan Ţârlea (from (Azerbaijan) Gabala)
—	DF	SRB	Milan Antić (to (Azerbaijan) Gabala)
—	DF	AZE	Nail Mammadov (from (Azerbaijan) Taraggi)

Out: Note: Flags indicate national team as defined under FIFA eligibility rules; some limited exceptions apply. Players may hold more than one non-FIFA nationality.

No.	Pos.	Nation	Player
1	GK	BIH	Edis Kurtanović
2	DF	AZE	Khayal Mustafayev (to (Azerbaijan) Inter Baku)
5	MF	AZE	Matlab Mammadov (released, joined (Azerbaijan) Taraggisummer 2012)
6	MF	AZE	Samir Zargarov (to (Azerbaijan) Inter Baku)
7	MF	AZE	Ramal Huseynov (to (Azerbaijan) Turan Tovuz)
9	MF	AZE	Samir Abdulov (to (Azerbaijan) Sumgayit City)
13	MF	GEO	Zura Dzamsashvili (to (Azerbaijan) Turan Tovuz)
14	MF	AZE	Asaf Qädiri (to (Azerbaijan) Turan Tovuz)
18	MF	AZE	Ibrahim Huseynov (released, joined (Azerbaijan) Taraggisummer 2012)
20	DF	UKR	Volodymyr Kozlenko
20	MF	AZE	Vusal Huseynov
22	GK	AZE	Ruslan Majidov
24	MF	SRB	Vladimir Zelenbaba (to (Canada) Waterloo Region)
25	FW	LAT	Kristaps Grebis (to (Azerbaijan) Simurq)
27	MF	AZE	Ramazan Abbasov (to (Azerbaijan) Ravan Baku)
28	MF	CMR	Patrice Noukeu (to (Belgium) Deinze)

=== Khazar Lankaran ===
In: Note: Flags indicate national team as defined under FIFA eligibility rules; some limited exceptions apply. Players may hold more than one non-FIFA nationality.

No.	Pos.	Nation	Player
1	GK	AZE	Kamal Bayramov (from (Azerbaijan) Turan Tovuz)
8	DF	BRA	Éder Bonfim (from (Romania) Steaua)
9	FW	ROU	Csaba Borbély (from (Romania) Oțelul Galați)
9	FW	AZE	Branimir Subašić (from (Azerbaijan) FC Gabala)
17	DF	AZE	Zahid Guliyev (from (Azerbaijan) Absheron)
22	FW	POR	António Semedo (from (Cyprus) Alki Larnaca)
27	MF	AZE	Habil Nurəhmədov (from (Azerbaijan) Absheron)
32	MF	ESP	Mario Rosas (from (Spain) Salamanca)
33	FW	SLO	Dejan Rusič (from (Saudi Arabia) Al Taawon)
77	MF	ROU	Marius Onofraş (from (Romania) Steaua)
80	FW	POR	João Paulo Pinto Ribeiro (from (Cyprus) Olympiakos Nicosia)
81	MF	BRA	Ricardo Gomes (from (Romania) Steaua)

Out: Note: Flags indicate national team as defined under FIFA eligibility rules; some limited exceptions apply. Players may hold more than one non-FIFA nationality.

No.	Pos.	Nation	Player
5	MF	BRA	Diego Souza (to (Azerbaijan) Inter Baku)
6	DF	POR	Bruno Simão (to (Portugal) Portimonense)
7	DF	AZE	Ruslan Poladov (to (Azerbaijan) Inter Baku)
8	DF	ROU	Nicolae Muşat (loan return to (Romania) Dinamo București)
9	FW	ROU	Alexandru Piţurcă
9	FW	ROU	Csaba Borbély (to (Romania) CF Brăila)
12	GK	UKR	Yevhen Kopyl
17	MF	ROU	Hristu Chiacu (loan return to (Romania) Dinamo București)
19	MF	GUI	Ibrahima Bangoura (to (Mali) Djoliba AC)
27	DF	ROU	Adrian Scarlatache (loan return to (Romania) Dinamo București)
28	DF	ROU	Cosmin Frăsinescu (loan return to (Romania) Gloria Bistriţa)
36	FW	CRC	Winston Parks (loan return to (Romania) Politehnica Timișoara)
55	MF	AZE	Tural Jalilov (on loan to (Azerbaijan) Ravan Baku)
77	DF	ROU	Stelian Stancu (to (Romania) Sportul Studențesc București)
77	MF	ROU	Marius Onofraş (fto (Romania) CSMS Iaşi)
80	FW	POR	João Paulo Pinto Ribeiro (to (Cyprus) Apollon Limassol)
—	DF	BIH	Veldin Muharemović (to (Bosnia and Herzegovina) FK Sarajevo)
—	MF	AZE	Asif Mammadov (to (Azerbaijan) Inter Baku)
—	FW	AZE	Amid Huseynov (on loan to (Azerbaijan) Ravan Baku)

=== Neftchi Baku ===
In: Note: Flags indicate national team as defined under FIFA eligibility rules; some limited exceptions apply. Players may hold more than one non-FIFA nationality.

No.	Pos.	Nation	Player
—	GK	SRB	Saša Stamenković (from (Serbia) Red Star)
—	MF	AZE	Araz Abdullayev (on loan from (England) Everton)
—	FW	AZE	Farid Guliev (loan return from (Azerbaijan) Simurq)
—	MF	AZE	Elvin Musazade (loan return from (Azerbaijan) Simurq)
—	DF	AZE	Elvin Yunuszade (loan return from (Azerbaijan) Simurq)

Out: Note: Flags indicate national team as defined under FIFA eligibility rules; some limited exceptions apply. Players may hold more than one non-FIFA nationality.

No.	Pos.	Nation	Player
—	GK	LTU	Paulius Grybauskas (to (Poland) Wigry Suwałki)
—	MF	AZE	Amit Guluzade (to (Turkey) Kayseri Erciyesspor)
—	GK	AZE	Emil Balayev (on loan to (Azerbaijan) Sumgayit City)
—	DF	AZE	Slavik Alkhasov (on loan to (Azerbaijan) Sumgayit City)
—	DF	AZE	Ruslan Tagizade (on loan to (Azerbaijan) Sumgayit City)
—	MF	AZE	Eshgin Guliyev (on loan to (Azerbaijan) Sumgayit City)
—	MF	AZE	Kamil Nurahmadov (on loan to (Azerbaijan) Sumgayit City)
—	FW	AZE	Orkhan Hasanov (on loan to (Azerbaijan) Sumgayit City)
—	FW	AZE	Ruslan Qurbanov (on loan to (Azerbaijan) Sumgayit City)

=== Qarabağ ===
In: Note: Flags indicate national team as defined under FIFA eligibility rules; some limited exceptions apply. Players may hold more than one non-FIFA nationality.

No.	Pos.	Nation	Player
—	MF	AZE	Bakhtiyar Soltanov (from (Azerbaijan) FK Baku)
—	MF	BRA	Leonardo da Silva Rocha (from (Azerbaijan) FK Baku)

Out: Note: Flags indicate national team as defined under FIFA eligibility rules; some limited exceptions apply. Players may hold more than one non-FIFA nationality.

No.	Pos.	Nation	Player
—	MF	AZE	Elvin Mammadov (to (Azerbaijan) FK Baku)
—	MF	AZE	Aslan Kerimov (to (Azerbaijan) Sumgayit City)
—	DF	AZE	Samir Abbasov (to (Azerbaijan) Sumgayit City)
—	GK	AZE	Sahil Kerimov (to (Azerbaijan) Sumgayit City)
—	MF	AZE	Rashad Kerimov (to (Azerbaijan) Sumgayit City)
—	FW	AZE	Murad Sattarly (on loan to (Azerbaijan) Sumgayit City)
—	DF	AZE	Aftandil Hajiyev (to (Azerbaijan) Turan Tovuz)
—	MF	AZE	Aykhan Abbasov (to (Azerbaijan) Turan Tovuz)
—	MF	LAT	Andrejs Rubins (to (Azerbaijan) Simurq)
—	MF	TUR	Devran Ayhan

=== Ravan Baku ===
In: Note: Flags indicate national team as defined under FIFA eligibility rules; some limited exceptions apply. Players may hold more than one non-FIFA nationality.

No.	Pos.	Nation	Player
1	GK	EST	Artur Kotenko (from (Cyprus) AEP Paphos)
3	DF	SRB	Miloš Zečević (from (Azerbaijan) Mughan)
4	DF	BIH	Ekrem Hodžić (from (Azerbaijan) Mughan)
5	MF	AZE	Natig Karimi (from (Azerbaijan) Absheron)
6	MF	AZE	Tagim Novruzov (from (Azerbaijan) Mughan)
7	MF	BRA	Igor Souza (from (Azerbaijan) Mughan)
8	DF	AZE	Tural Akhundov (from (Azerbaijan) Mughan)
9	FW	SWE	John Pelu (from (Azerbaijan) Mughan)
10	FW	URU	Angel Gutiérrez (from (Azerbaijan) Mughan)
11	DF	SLE	Sheriff Suma (from (Azerbaijan) Mughan)
12	GK	AZE	Davud Karimi (from (Azerbaijan) Mughan)
13	DF	AZE	Farid Hashimzade (from (Azerbaijan) Mughan)
15	MF	AZE	Tural Jalilov (on loan from (Azerbaijan) Khazar Lankaran)
17	MF	AZE	Ramazan Abbasov (from (Azerbaijan) FC Kəpəz)
18	MF	SLE	Samuel Barlay (from (Azerbaijan) Mughan)
19	FW	CMR	Bong Bertrand (from (Oman) Saham Club)
20	MF	ARG	Cristián Torres (from (Azerbaijan) FC Gabala)
21	MF	AZE	Jeyhun Abdullayev (from (Azerbaijan) Mughan)
22	FW	AZE	Amid Huseynov (on loan from (Azerbaijan) Khazar Lankaran)
30	MF	RUS	Sharapudin Shalbuzov (from (Russia) Anzhi)
87	MF	GEO	George Gulordava (from (Azerbaijan) Mughan)
90	MF	RUS	Sergey Chernyshev (from (Azerbaijan) Mughan)
—	DF	AZE	Elkhan Jabrailov (from (Azerbaijan) Mughan)
—	MF	AZE	Anar Gasimov (from (Azerbaijan) Mughan)

Out: Note: Flags indicate national team as defined under FIFA eligibility rules; some limited exceptions apply. Players may hold more than one non-FIFA nationality.

No.	Pos.	Nation	Player
—	GK	AZE	Kamil Qafarov (released)
—	GK	AZE	Elchin Jafarov Qafarov (released)
—	GK	AZE	Kenan Hajiyev (released)
—	DF	AZE	Mushfig Gambarov (released)
—	DF	AZE	Bakhtiyar Mehraliyev (released)
—	DF	AZE	Shahin Khasayly (released)
—	DF	AZE	Rashad Mammadov (released)
—	DF	AZE	Shikhgayib Shikhgayibov (released)
—	DF	AZE	Elchin Hashimov (released)
—	GK	AZE	Tarik Gasymov (released)
—	DF	AZE	Fakhraddin Murvatov (released)
—	MF	AZE	Samed Rzayev (released)
—	MF	AZE	Javid Rajabov (released)
—	MF	AZE	Elnur Huseynov (released)
—	MF	AZE	Farkhad Iskanderov (released)
—	MF	AZE	Agshin Hashimov (released)
—	MF	AZE	Eldar Ismayilov (released)
—	MF	AZE	Asif Zeynalov (released)
—	FW	AZE	Izzatali Suleymanov (released)
—	FW	AZE	Zahid Tayibov (released)
—	FW	AZE	Emin Amiraslanov (released)
—	FW	AZE	Zaur Mammadov (released)
—	MF	NGR	Abu Abedi Kanu (released)

=== Simurq ===
In: Note: Flags indicate national team as defined under FIFA eligibility rules; some limited exceptions apply. Players may hold more than one non-FIFA nationality.

No.	Pos.	Nation	Player
—	MF	AZE	Tofig Mikayilov (on loan from (Azerbaijan) Inter Baku)
—	FW	AZE	Ali Bagirov (on loan from (Azerbaijan) Inter Baku)
—	MF	BUL	Daniel Genov (on loan from (Azerbaijan) Inter Baku)
—	FW	LTU	Robertas Poškus (from (Azerbaijan) Inter Baku)
—	MF	RUS	Vasili Yanotovsky (from (Russia) KUZBASS Kemerovo)
—	MF	UKR	Yevhen Shmakov (from (Belarus) FC Gomel)
—	MF	LAT	Andrejs Rubins (from (Azerbaijan) FK Qarabağ)
—	FW	LAT	Kristaps Grebis (from (Azerbaijan) FC Kəpəz)
—	DF	LTU	Vidas Alunderis (from (Russia) Baltika Kaliningrad)
—	DF	AZE	Rashad Eyyubov (from (Ukraine) Chornomorets Odesa)
—	MF	AZE	Elchin Khalilov (from (Azerbaijan) MOIK)
—	DF	AZE	Aleksandr Shemonayev (from (Azerbaijan) MOIK)
—	MF	AZE	Ruhid Usubov (from (Azerbaijan) MOIK)
—	DF	AZE	Samir Guliyev (from (Azerbaijan) Bakili)
—	GK	AZE	Bakhtiyar Gozalov (from (Azerbaijan) Qaradağ)

Out: Note: Flags indicate national team as defined under FIFA eligibility rules; some limited exceptions apply. Players may hold more than one non-FIFA nationality.

No.	Pos.	Nation	Player
—	FW	AZE	Farid Guliev (loan return to (Azerbaijan) Neftchi Baku)
—	MF	AZE	Elvin Musazade (loan return to (Azerbaijan) Neftchi Baku)
—	DF	AZE	Elvin Yunuszade (loan return to (Azerbaijan) Neftchi Baku)
—	FW	AZE	Samir Aliyev (to (Azerbaijan) Turan Tovuz)
—	GK	AZE	Tural Abbaszade (to (Azerbaijan) FC Kəpəz)
—	MF	AZE	Vasif Aliyev (to (Azerbaijan) FC Kəpəz)
—	MF	AZE	Jamal Mammadov (loan return to (Azerbaijan) Inter Baku)
—	DF	AZE	Emin Guliyev
—	MF	AZE	Tabriz Mutallimov
—	FW	AZE	Ramin Nasibov

=== Sumgayit City ===
In: Note: Flags indicate national team as defined under FIFA eligibility rules; some limited exceptions apply. Players may hold more than one non-FIFA nationality.

No.	Pos.	Nation	Player
—	MF	AZE	Aslan Kerimov (from (Azerbaijan) FK Qarabağ)
—	DF	AZE	Samir Abbasov (from (Azerbaijan) FK Qarabağ)
—	GK	AZE	Sahil Kerimov (from (Azerbaijan) FK Qarabağ)
—	MF	AZE	Rashad Kerimov (from (Azerbaijan) FK Qarabağ)
—	FW	AZE	Murad Sattarly (on loan from (Azerbaijan) FK Qarabağ)
—	DF	AZE	Haji Ahmadov (on loan from (Azerbaijan) FK Baku)
—	MF	AZE	Mahmud Qurbanov (from (Azerbaijan) FK Baku)
—	MF	AZE	Aleksandr Gross (on loan from (Azerbaijan) Inter Baku)
—	MF	AZE	Samir Abdulov (from (Azerbaijan) FC Kəpəz)
—	GK	AZE	Emil Balayev (on loan from (Azerbaijan) Neftchi Baku)
—	DF	AZE	Slavik Alkhasov (on loan from (Azerbaijan) Neftchi Baku)
—	DF	AZE	Ruslan Tagizade (on loan from (Azerbaijan) Neftchi Baku)
—	MF	AZE	Eshgin Guliyev (on loan from (Azerbaijan) Neftchi Baku)
—	MF	AZE	Kamil Nurahmadov (on loan from (Azerbaijan) Neftchi Baku)
—	FW	AZE	Orkhan Hasanov (on loan from (Azerbaijan) Neftchi Baku)
—	FW	AZE	Ruslan Qurbanov (on loan from (Azerbaijan) Neftchi Baku)
—	GK	AZE	Andrey Popoviç (from (Azerbaijan) Absheron)
—	DF	AZE	Ramil Nuriyev (from (Azerbaijan) Absheron)
—	DF	AZE	Timur Israfilov (from (Azerbaijan) Absheron)
—	MF	AZE	Emin Mustafayev (from (Azerbaijan) MOIK)
—	FW	AZE	Orkhan Aliyev (from (Russia) FC Electroautomatic)
—	FW	AZE	Ruslan Nasirli (from (Russia) Mashuk Pyatigorsk)
—	MF	AZE	Shamil Jamaladdinov (from (Russia) Rubin Kazan)
—	FW	AZE	Rustam Asgarov (from (Russia) FC Tekstilshchik Ivanovo)
—	DF	AZE	Badavi Huseynov (from (Russia) Anzhi)
—	FW	AZE	Eldar Mammadov (from (Russia) Krasnodar-2000)
—	FW	AZE	Samir Yusifov (from (Russia) Lokomotiv Moscow)
—	MF	AZE	Agil Mammadov

Out: Note: Flags indicate national team as defined under FIFA eligibility rules; some limited exceptions apply. Players may hold more than one non-FIFA nationality.

No.	Pos.	Nation	Player

=== Turan ===
In: Note: Flags indicate national team as defined under FIFA eligibility rules; some limited exceptions apply. Players may hold more than one non-FIFA nationality.

No.	Pos.	Nation	Player
1	GK	AZE	Anar Nazirov (from (Azerbaijan) Gabala)
6	DF	MNE	Aleksandar Dubljević (from (Montenegro) Čelik Nikšić)
7	DF	AZE	Ramal Huseynov (from (Azerbaijan) Kəpəz)
14	MF	GEO	Aleksandr Gogoberishvili (from (Georgia (country)) Sioni)
15	MF	AZE	Namig Aliyev (from (Azerbaijan) Gabala)
17	FW	AZE	Samir Aliyev (from (Azerbaijan) Simurq)
19	DF	AZE	Ruslan Abbasov (from (Azerbaijan) FK Shamkir)
27	MF	GEO	Zura Dzamsashvili (from (Azerbaijan) Kəpəz)
—	GK	GER	Goksu Hasancik (from (Estonia) Tammeka Tartu)
—	GK	AZE	Zabid Safarov
—	DF	AZE	Aftandil Hajiyev (from (Azerbaijan) Qarabağ)
—	MF	AZE	Aykhan Abbasov (from (Azerbaijan) Qarabağ)
—	MF	AZE	Jamal Mammadov (from (Azerbaijan) Inter Baku)
—	MF	BRA	Rudison (from (France) Dieppe)
—	FW	UKR	Serhiy Artiukh (from (Ukraine) Zakarpattia Uzhhorod)

Out: Note: Flags indicate national team as defined under FIFA eligibility rules; some limited exceptions apply. Players may hold more than one non-FIFA nationality.

No.	Pos.	Nation	Player
—	DF	TUR	Muammer Erdoğdu (to (Azerbaijan) Kəpəz)
—	MF	AZE	Khayal Garayev (to (Azerbaijan) Kəpəz)
—	DF	AZE	Elnur Abbasov (to (Azerbaijan) Kəpəz)
—	GK	AZE	Kamal Bayramov (to (Azerbaijan) Khazar Lankaran)
—	DF	AZE	Vurğun Hüseynov (to (Azerbaijan) Gabala)
—	FW	BUL	Boris Kondev (to (Bulgaria) Montana)
—	MF	GEO	Oleg Gvelesiani (to (Georgia (country)) Dila Gori)
—	FW	MDA	Victor Gonta (to (Moldova) Costuleni)
—	MF	BRA	Marco Tulio (to (Malaysia) T-Team)
—	DF	AZE	Huseyn Isgandarov (to (Azerbaijan) Ravan Baku)
—	MF	RUS	Rashid Gasanov
—	GK	RUS	Shamil Saidov
