= 2011–12 Simurq PFC season =

Simurq
2011–12 season
- Chairman: Anar Bakirov
- Manager: Sergei Yuran until 5 March 2012; Igor Getman (interim); 5 - 11 March 2012; Giorgi Chikhradze from 5 March 2012
- Stadium: Zaqatala City Stadium
- Premier League: 9th
- Azerbaijan Cup: First Round vs Neftchi Baku
- Top goalscorer: League: Robertas Poškus (8); All: Robertas Poškus (8)
- Highest home attendance: 2,500 vs Neftchi Baku; 30 September 2011; 29 November 2011
- Lowest home attendance: 0 vs Gabala; 16 February 2012 vs FK Baku; 20 February 2012
- Average home league attendance: 1,165
Home colours	Away colours

The Simurq PFC 2011–12 season was Simurq PFC's sixth Azerbaijan Premier League season. They started the season under the management of Sergei Yuran, before his contract was mutually terminated on 5 March. Igor Getman was appointed as the club's caretaker manager from the 5th to 11 March, when Giorgi Chikhradze was then appointed as their permanent manager. They finished the season in 9th position and were knocked out of the Azerbaijan Cup at the first round stage by vs Neftchi Baku.

== Squad ==
Note: Flags indicate national team as defined under FIFA eligibility rules; some limited exceptions apply. Players may hold more than one non-FIFA nationality.

No.	Pos.	Nation	Player
1	GK	AZE	Fuad Ahmadov
2	DF	AZE	Ilkin Qirtimov
3	DF	AZE	Rasim Ramaldanov (captain)
4	MF	RUS	Vasili Yanotovsky
5	FW	AZE	Rashad Eyyubov
6	MF	AZE	Mikayil Rahimov
7	DF	AZE	Ruslan Poladov (loan from Inter Baku)
8	MF	AZE	Garib Ibrahimov
9	FW	AZE	Ali Bagirov (loan from Inter Baku)
10	MF	AZE	Tofig Mikayilov (loan from Inter Baku)
14	MF	LAT	Andrejs Rubins

No.	Pos.	Nation	Player
15	MF	AZE	Nijat Gurbanov (loan from Neftchi Baku)
17	DF	AZE	Rustam Mammadov
19	FW	MDA	Anatolie Doroş
21	DF	AZE	Emin Jafarguliyev (loan from FK Baku)
27	MF	AZE	Ramil Sayadov
28	DF	AZE	Rustam Abbasov (loan from Inter Baku)
29	MF	LAT	Igors Tarasovs
32	GK	AZE	Dmitriy Kramarenko (loan from Inter Baku)
52	GK	AZE	Bakhtiyar Gozalov
77	FW	BUL	Daniel Genov (loan from Inter Baku)
79	DF	LTU	Vidas Alunderis

== Transfers ==
=== Summer ===
In: Note: Flags indicate national team as defined under FIFA eligibility rules; some limited exceptions apply. Players may hold more than one non-FIFA nationality.

No.	Pos.	Nation	Player
4	MF	RUS	Vasili Yanotovsky (from (Russia) KUZBASS Kemerovo)
5	FW	AZE	Rashad Eyyubov (from (Ukraine) Chornomorets Odesa)
7	MF	AZE	Elchin Khalilov (from (Azerbaijan) MOIK)
9	FW	AZE	Ali Bagirov (on loan from (Azerbaijan) Inter Baku)
10	MF	AZE	Tofig Mikayilov (on loan from (Azerbaijan) Inter Baku)
11	FW	LTU	Robertas Poškus (from (Azerbaijan) Inter Baku)
13	DF	AZE	Aleksandr Shemonayev (from (Azerbaijan) MOIK)
14	MF	LAT	Andrejs Rubins (from (Azerbaijan) FK Qarabağ)
21	FW	LAT	Kristaps Grebis (from (Azerbaijan) FC Kəpəz)
28	MF	UKR	Yevhen Shmakov (from (Belarus) FC Gomel)
29	DF	AZE	Samir Guliyev (from (Azerbaijan) Bakili)
52	GK	AZE	Bakhtiyar Gozalov (from (Azerbaijan) Qaradağ)
77	MF	BUL	Daniel Genov (on loan from (Azerbaijan) Inter Baku)
79	DF	LTU	Vidas Alunderis (from (Russia) Baltika Kaliningrad)
—	MF	AZE	Ruhid Usubov (from (Azerbaijan) MOIK)

Out: Note: Flags indicate national team as defined under FIFA eligibility rules; some limited exceptions apply. Players may hold more than one non-FIFA nationality.

No.	Pos.	Nation	Player
—	FW	AZE	Farid Guliev (loan return to (Azerbaijan) Neftchi Baku)
—	MF	AZE	Elvin Musazade (loan return to (Azerbaijan) Neftchi Baku)
—	DF	AZE	Elvin Yunuszade (loan return to (Azerbaijan) Neftchi Baku)
—	FW	AZE	Samir Aliyev (to (Azerbaijan) Turan Tovuz)
—	GK	AZE	Tural Abbaszade (to (Azerbaijan) FC Kəpəz)
—	MF	AZE	Vasif Aliyev (to (Azerbaijan) FC Kəpəz)
—	MF	AZE	Jamal Mammadov (loan return to (Azerbaijan) Inter Baku)
—	DF	AZE	Emin Guliyev
—	MF	AZE	Tabriz Mutallimov
—	FW	AZE	Ramin Nasibov

=== Winter ===
In: Note: Flags indicate national team as defined under FIFA eligibility rules; some limited exceptions apply. Players may hold more than one non-FIFA nationality.

No.	Pos.	Nation	Player
7	MF	AZE	Ruslan Poladov (on loan from (Azerbaijan) Inter Baku)
15	MF	AZE	Nijat Gurbanov (on loan from (Azerbaijan) Neftchi Baku)
19	FW	MDA	Anatolie Doroş (from (Kazakhstan) FC Irtysh)
21	DF	AZE	Emin Jafarguliyev (on loan from (Azerbaijan) FC Baku)
28	DF	AZE	Rustam Abbasov (on loan from (Azerbaijan) Inter Baku)
29	MF	LAT	Igors Tarasovs (from (Latvia) Skonto Riga)
32	GK	AZE	Dmitri Kramarenko (on loan from (Azerbaijan) Inter Baku)
—	FW	AZE	Ilham Allahverdiyev (on loan from (Azerbaijan) Neftchi Baku)

Out: Note: Flags indicate national team as defined under FIFA eligibility rules; some limited exceptions apply. Players may hold more than one non-FIFA nationality.

No.	Pos.	Nation	Player
7	MF	AZE	Elchin Khalilov
13	DF	AZE	Aleksandr Shemonayev
21	FW	LAT	Kristaps Grebis (to (Germany) BFC Viktoria 1889)
28	MF	UKR	Yevhen Shmakov
29	MF	AZE	Samir Guliyev
32	GK	CRO	Adnan Hodžić (to (Croatia) Crikvenica)
—	DF	AZE	Anar Hasanli

== Competitions ==
=== Azerbaijan Premier League ===
==== Results summary ====
Overall								Home						Away					
Pld	W	D	L	GF	GA	GD	Pts	W	D	L	GF	GA	GD	W	D	L	GF	GA	GD
0	0	0	0	0	0	0	0	0	0	0	0	0	0	0	0	0	0	0	0

Last updated: 13 August 2011.
Source: Soccerway

==== Results ====
7 August 2011 1	Simurq	0 – 3	AZAL	Zaqatala
20:00 AZST (UTC+5)	Shemonayev (red card) 67'	Summary	Benouahi 17', 46'; Ramaldanov 90+3' (o.g.); Ibekoyi (yellow card) 13' (red card) 40'	Stadium: Zaqatala City Stadium; Attendance: 2,000; Referee: Ramil Diniyev

14 August 2011 2	FK Baku	0 – 0	Simurq	Baku
21:00 AZST (UTC+5)		Summary		Stadium: Tofig Bakhramov Stadium; Attendance: 500; Referee: Rovshan Ahmadov

19 August 2011 3	Simurq	1 – 1	Ravan Baku	Zaqatala
20:00 AZST (UTC+5)	Khalilov 82'	Summary	Abbasov 90+4'	Stadium: Zaqatala City Stadium; Attendance: 2,000; Referee: Fariz Yusifov

28 August 2011 4	Turan Tovuz	1 – 0	Simurq	Tovuz
17:30 AZST (UTC+5)	Artiukh 37'	Summary		Stadium: Tovuz City Stadium; Attendance: 6,000; Referee: Anar Salmanov

10 September 2011 5	Inter Baku	1 – 0	Simurq	Baku
19:00 AZST (UTC+5)	Abramidze 53'	Summary		Stadium: Shafa Stadium; Attendance: 600; Referee: Rahim Hasanov

17 September 2011 6	Simurq	4 – 2	Kəpəz	Zaqatala
18:00 AZST (UTC+5)	Poškus 6'; Shmakov 32', 70'; Qirtimov (red card) 65'; Mikayilov 80'	Summary	Ţârlea (yellow card) 35' (yellow-red card) 45'; Fomenko 12'; Sultanov (red card) 74'; Feutchine 76'	Stadium: Zaqatala City Stadium; Attendance: 1,500; Referee: Elchin Mämmädov

24 September 2011 7	Sumgayit	0 – 1	Simurq	Sumgayit
15:00 AZST (UTC+5)		Summary	Poškus 10'	Stadium: Mehdi Huseynzade Stadium; Attendance: 500; Referee: Vusal Äliyev

30 September 2011 8	Simurq	1 – 2	Neftchi Baku	Zaqatala
19:00 AZST (UTC+5)	Mikayilov 86'	Summary	Seyidov 8'; Guliev 90'	Stadium: Zaqatala City Stadium; Attendance: 2,500; Referee: Rovshan Ahmadov

16 October 2011 9	Khazar Lankaran	1 – 0	Simurq	Lankaran
17:30 AZST (UTC+5)	Semedo 27'	Summary		Stadium: Lankaran City Stadium; Attendance: 5,000; Referee: Rauf Jabbarov

21 October 2011 10	Simurq	0 – 1	Qarabağ	Zaqatala
17:00 AZST (UTC+5)		Summary	Aliyev 61'	Stadium: Zaqatala City Stadium; Attendance: 2,000; Referee: Elnur Muradov

29 October 2011 11	Gabala	0 – 2	Simurq	Qabala
15:00 AZST (UTC+5)		Summary	Shmakov 41'; Poškus 60'	Stadium: Gabala City Stadium; Attendance: 500; Referee: Fariz Yusifov

4 November 2011 12	Ravan Baku	1 – 1	Simurq	Baku
16:00 AZST (UTC+5)	Barlay 15'; E.Hodzic (yellow card) 43' (yellow-red card) 56'	Summary	Yanotovskiy (yellow card) 43' (yellow-red card) 63'; Rubins 72'	Stadium: Dalga Arena; Attendance: 250; Referee: Rammil Diniyev

19 November 2011 13	Simurq	1 – 0	Sumgayit	Zaqatala
16:00 AZST (UTC+5)	Poškus 80'	Summary		Stadium: Zaqatala City Stadium; Attendance: 1,000; Referee: Anar Salmanov

25 November 2011 14	Simurq	2 – 2	Khazar Lankaran	Zaqatala
16:30 AZST (UTC+5)	Poškus 66'; Ramaldanov 82'	Summary	Doman 21'; Semedo 42'; Doman (yellow card) 39' (yellow-red card) 80'	Stadium: Zaqatala City Stadium; Attendance: 1,000; Referee: Fariz Yusifov

4 December 2011 15	Neftchi Baku	4 – 2	Simurq	Baku
14:00 AZST (UTC+5)	Abdullayev 10', 36'; Nasimov 69'; Abishov 75'	Summary	Poškus 18'; Grebis 90+2'	Stadium: Ismat Gayibov Stadium; Attendance: 1,000; Referee: Fariz Yusifov

10 December 2011 16	Simurq	2 – 1	Turan Tovuz	Zaqatala
16:00 AZST (UTC+5)	Gogoberishvili 74' (o.g.); Poškus 81'	Summary	A.Taghiyev 90'	Stadium: Zaqatala City Stadium; Attendance: 1,200; Referee: Elvin Äsgärov

16 December 2011 17	AZAL	5 – 1	Simurq	Baku
16:00 AZT (UTC+4)	Mammadov 17'; Benouahi 19' (pen.); Schutz 49', 53'; Boghiu 90+2'	Summary	Poškus 68'	Stadium: AZAL Stadium; Attendance: 950; Referee: Anar Salmanov

20 December 2011 18	Simurq	0 – 2	Inter Baku	Zaqatala
16:00 AZST (UTC+5)	Qirtimov (red card) 54'	Summary	Tskhadadze 13' (pen.); Krastovchev 88'	Stadium: Zaqatala City Stadium; Attendance: 1,200; Referee: Elvin Askerov

16 February 2012 20	Simurq	0 – 1	Gabala	Zaqatala
13:00 AZST (UTC+5)		Summary	Mendy 85'	Stadium: Zaqatala City Stadium; Attendance: 0^{1} Referee: Rahim Hasanov

20 February 2012 21	Simurq	0 – 2	FK Baku	Zaqatala
16:00 AZST (UTC+5)		Summary	Baković 2'; Horvat (yellow card) 61' (yellow-red card) 62'; Koke 64'	Stadium: Zaqatala City Stadium; Attendance: 0 Referee: Anar Salmanov

3 March 2012 22	Kəpəz	2 – 0	Simurq	Ganja
14:00 AZST (UTC+5)	Karimov 34'; Fomenko 67'	Summary		Stadium: Ganja City Stadium; Attendance: 8,000; Referee: Fariz Yusifov

7 March 2012 19	Qarabağ	2 – 0	Simurq	Baku
14:30 AZST (UTC+5)	Sadygov 22'; Nadirov 53'	Summary		Stadium: Tofiq Bahramov Stadium^{2} Attendance: 2,000; Referee: Aliyar Ağayev

==== Table ====
Pos	Team	Pld	W	D	L	GF	GA	GD	Pts	Qualification
8	Ravan Baku	22	6	7	9	23	29	−6	25	Qualification for relegation group
9	Kapaz	22	6	4	12	26	38	−12	22	Qualification for relegation group
10	Simurq	22	5	4	13	18	34	−16	19	Qualification for relegation group
11	Sumgayit	22	4	3	15	16	37	−21	15	Qualification for relegation group
12	Turan	22	3	2	17	13	33	−20	11	Qualification for relegation group

Source: Soccerway: Azerbaijan Premier League Table
Rules for classification: 1) points; 2) goal difference; 3) number of goals scored.

=== Azerbaijan Premier League Relegation Group ===
==== Results summary ====
Overall								Home						Away					
Pld	W	D	L	GF	GA	GD	Pts	W	D	L	GF	GA	GD	W	D	L	GF	GA	GD
10	3	6	1	9	7	+2	15	1	3	1	6	6	0	2	3	0	3	1	+2

==== Results ====
11 March 2012 23	Simurq	1 – 1	Kəpəz	Zaqatala
16:00 AZST (UTC+5)	Alunderis 18'; Yanotovsky (red card) 61'	Summary	Svezhentsev 45+2'; Sultanov (red card) 61'	Stadium: Zaqatala City Stadium; Attendance: 400; Referee: Elvin Äsgärov

17 March 2012 24	Simurq	1 – 1	Turan Tovuz	Zaqatala
16:00 AZST (UTC+5)	Tarasovs 63'	Summary	Hajiyev (red card) 73'; Gogoberishvili 90' (pen.)	Stadium: Zaqatala City Stadium; Attendance: 500; Referee: Orkhan Mämmädov

25 March 2012 25	Sumgayit	1 – 2	Simurq	Sumgayit
14:00 AZST (UTC+5)	Abbasov 90+2'	Summary	Genov 4'; Doroş 52'	Stadium: Mehdi Huseynzade Stadium; Attendance: 600; Referee: Rauf Jabbarov

1 April 2012 26	Simurq	1 – 2	AZAL	Zaqatala
16:00 AZST (UTC+5)	Tarasovs 24'	Summary	Safiyaroglu 27'; Kvirtiya 61'	Stadium: Zaqatala City Stadium; Attendance: 300; Referee: Orkhan Mämmädov

8 April 2012 27	Ravan Baku	0 – 0	Simurq	Baku
18:15 AZST (UTC+5)		Summary		Stadium: Dalga Arena; Attendance: 1,350; Referee: Rauf Jabbarov

15 April 2012 28	Turan Tovuz	0 – 0	Simurq	Tovuz
16:00 AZST (UTC+5)		Summary		Stadium: Tovuz City Stadium; Attendance: 4,000; Referee: Fariz Yusifov

21 April 2012 29	Simurq	2 – 1	Sumgayit	Zaqatala
18:00 AZST (UTC+5)	Poladov 35'; Doroş 67'	Summary	Quliyev (red card) 54'; Äliyev 78'	Stadium: Zaqatala City Stadium; Attendance: 1,200; Referee: Rahim Häsänov

29 April 2012 30	AZAL	0 – 0	Simurq	Baku
18:15 AZST (UTC+5)		Summary		Stadium: AZAL Arena; Attendance: 250; Referee: Orkhan Mämmädov

6 May 2012 31	Simurq	1 – 1	Ravan Baku	Zaqatala
17:30 AZST (UTC+5)	Ramaldanov 8'	Summary	Vidaković 85'; Barlay (yellow card) 22' (yellow-red card) 90+3'	Stadium: Zaqatala City Stadium; Attendance: 500; Referee: Fuad Häsänov

12 May 2012 32	Kəpəz	0 – 1	Simurq	Ganja
17:30 AZST (UTC+5)		Summary	Tarasovs 59'	Stadium: Ganja City Stadium; Attendance: 1,200; Referee: Orkhan Mämmädov

==== Table ====
Pos	Team	Pld	W	D	L	GF	GA	GD	Pts	Qualification or relegation
7	AZAL	32	12	8	12	44	44	0	44	
8	Ravan Baku	32	10	11	11	39	39	0	41	
9	Simurq	32	8	10	14	27	41	−14	34	
10	Kapaz	32	9	5	18	35	55	−20	32	
11	Turan (R)	32	6	7	19	26	42	−16	25	Qualification for relegation playoffs
12	Sumgayit (R)	32	6	6	20	27	52	−25	24	Relegation to Azerbaijan First Division

Source: Soccerway.com
Rules for classification: 1) points; 2) goal difference; 3) number of goals scored.
(R) Relegated

=== Azerbaijan Cup ===
29 November 2011 First Round	Simurq	0 – 1	Neftchi Baku	Zaqatala
16:00 AZT (UTC+4)	Yanotovsky (red card) 83'	Summary	Nasimov 15'; Flavinho (red card) 30'	Stadium: Zaqatala City Stadium; Attendance: 2,500; Referee: Rahim Hasanov

== Squad statistics ==
=== Appearances and goals ===
No.	Pos	Nat	Player	Total		Premier League		Azerbaijan Cup	
No.	Pos	Nat	Player	Apps	Goals	Apps	Goals	Apps	Goals
1	GK	(Azerbaijan) AZE	Fuad Ähmädovc	3	0	2+0	0	1+0	0
2	MF	(Azerbaijan) AZE	Ilkin Qirtimov	26	0	25+0	0	1+0	0
3	DF	(Azerbaijan) AZE	Rasim Ramaldanov	25	2	23+1	2	1+0	0
4	MF	(Russia) RUS	Vasili Yanotovskiy	29	0	27+1	0	1+0	0
5	FW	(Azerbaijan) AZE	Rashad Eyyubov	4	0	0+4	0	0+0	0
6	DF	(Azerbaijan) AZE	Mikayil Rähimov	16	0	5+10	0	1+0	0
7	DF	(Azerbaijan) AZE	Ruslan Poladov	14	0	14+0	0	0+0	0
8	MF	(Azerbaijan) AZE	Garib Ibrahimov	29	0	25+3	0	1+0	0
9	FW	(Azerbaijan) AZE	Ali Bağırov	16	0	3+12	0	0+1	0
10	MF	(Azerbaijan) AZE	Tofig Mikayılov	23	2	14+8	2	1+0	0
11	FW	(Lithuania) LTU	Robertas Poškus	16	8	14+2	8	0+0	0
14	MF	(Latvia) LAT	Andrejs Rubins	19	1	14+4	1	1+0	0
15	MF	(Azerbaijan) AZE	Nijat Qurbanov	4	0	1+3	0	0+0	0
17	DF	(Azerbaijan) AZE	Rustem Mämmädov	20	0	11+9	0	0+0	0
19	FW	(Moldova) MDA	Anatolie Doroş	14	2	14+0	2	0+0	0
21	DF	(Azerbaijan) AZE	Emin Jafarguliyev	12	0	9+3	0	0+0	0
27	MF	(Azerbaijan) AZE	Ramil Sayadov	4	0	2+2	0	0+0	0
28	DF	(Azerbaijan) AZE	Rustam Abbasov	12	0	11+1	0	0+0	0
29	MF	(Latvia) LAT	Igors Tarasovs	15	3	13+1	3	1+0	0
32	GK	(Azerbaijan) AZE	Dmitri Kramarenko	15	0	14+0	0	1+0	0
77	FW	(Bulgaria) BUL	Daniel Genov	26	1	22+3	1	1+0	0
79	DF	(Lithuania) LTU	Vidas Alunderis	27	1	26+0	1	1+0	0
	MF	(Azerbaijan) AZE	Ruhid Usubov	11	0	0+10	0	0+1	0
Players who appeared for Simurq no longer at the club:
7	MF	(Azerbaijan) AZE	Elchin Khälilov	4	1	1+3	1	0+0	0
13	DF	(Azerbaijan) AZE	Aleksandr Shemonayev	27	0	26+0	0	1+0	0
21	FW	(Latvia) LAT	Kristaps Grebis	14	1	2+11	1	0+1	0
28	MF	(Ukraine) UKR	Yevhen Shmakov	19	3	18+0	3	1+0	0
29	MF	(Azerbaijan) AZE	Samir Guliyev	1	0	0+1	0	0+0	0
32	GK	(Croatia) CRO	Adnan Hodžić	17	0	16+0	0	1+0	0
	DF	(Azerbaijan) AZE	Anar Häsänli	3	0	2+1	0	0+0	0

=== Goal scorers ===
Place	Position	Nation	Number	Name	Premier League	Azerbaijan Cup	Total
1	FW	(Lithuania)	11	Robertas Poškus	8	0	8
2	MF	(Ukraine)	28	Yevhen Shmakov	3	0	0
2	MF	(Latvia)	9	Igors Tarasovs	3	0	0
3	MF	(Azerbaijan)	10	Tofig Mikayilov	2	0	0
3	DF	(Azerbaijan)	3	Rasim Ramaldanov	2	0	0
3	FW	(Moldova)	19	Anatolie Doroş	2	0	0
6	MF	(Azerbaijan)	7	Elchin Khalilov	1	0	0
6	MF	(Latvia)	14	Andrejs Rubins	1	0	0
6	FW	(Latvia)	21	Kristaps Grebis	1	0	0
6	DF	(Lithuania)	79	Vidas Alunderis	1	0	0
6	MF	(Bulgaria)	77	Daniel Genov	1	0	0
6	DF	(Azerbaijan)	7	Ruslan Poladov	1	0	0
6				Own goal	1	0	0
				TOTALS	27	0	27

=== Disciplinary record ===
Number	Nation	Position	Name	Premier League		Azerbaijan Cup		Total	
Number	Nation	Position	Name	Yellow card	Red card	Yellow card	Red card	Yellow card	Red card
2	(Azerbaijan)	MF	Ilkin Qirtimov	4	2	1	0	5	2
3	(Azerbaijan)	DF	Rasim Ramaldanov	8	0	0	0	8	0
4	(Russia)	MF	Vasili Yanotovskiy	6	2	0	1	6	3
6	(Azerbaijan)	DF	Mikayil Rähimov	3	0	0	0	3	0
7	(Azerbaijan)	DF	Ruslan Poladov	1	0	0	0	1	0
7	(Azerbaijan)	MF	Elchin Khälilov	1	0	0	0	1	0
8	(Azerbaijan)	MF	Garib Ibrahimov	3	0	0	0	3	0
9	(Azerbaijan)	MF	Ali Bağırov	3	0	0	0	3	0
10	(Azerbaijan)	MF	Tofig Mikayılov	2	0	0	0	2	0
11	(Lithuania)	MF	Robertas Poškus	3	0	0	0	3	0
13	(Azerbaijan)	DF	Aleksandr Shemonayev	6	1	0	0	6	1
15	(Azerbaijan)	MF	Nijat Qurbanov	1	0	0	0	1	0
17	(Azerbaijan)	DF	Rustem Mämmädov	2	0	0	0	2	0
21	(Latvia)	MF	Kristaps Grebis	1	0	1	0	2	0
21	(Azerbaijan)	DF	Emin Jafarguliyev	4	0	0	0	4	0
28	(Ukraine)	MF	Yevhen Shmakov	1	0	1	0	2	0
28	(Azerbaijan)	DF	Rustam Abbasov	3	0	0	0	3	0
29	(Latvia)	MF	Igors Tarasovs	3	0	0	0	3	0
32	(Croatia)	GK	Adnan Hodžić	1	0	0	0	1	0
32	(Azerbaijan)	GK	Dmitri Kramarenko	1	0	0	0	1	0
77	(Bulgaria)	MF	Daniel Genov	3	0	0	0	3	0
79	(Lithuania)	DF	Vidas Alunderis	12	0	0	0	12	0
	(Azerbaijan)	MF	Ruhid Usubov	2	0	0	0	2	0
			TOTALS	74	4	3	1	77	5

== Notes ==
- The match is played without spectators.
- Qarabağ have played their home games at the Tofiq Bahramov Stadium since 1993 due to the ongoing situation in Quzanlı.
