= 2011–12 PFC Turan Tovuz season =

Turan Tovuz
2011–12 season
- President: Tofig Zeynalov
- Manager: Asgar Abdullayev
- Stadium: Tovuz City Stadium
- Premier League: 11th
- Azerbaijan Cup: First Round vs Inter Baku
- Top goalscorer: League: Serhiy Artiukh (5); All: Serhiy Artiukh (5)
Home colours	Away colours

The Turan Tovuz 2011–12 season is Turan Tovuz's nineteenth Azerbaijan Premier League season. They finished the regular season in 12th place, meaning they took part in the Relegation group. They finished this group in 5th place, 11th over the whole league, and were put into the Relegation play-offs against FK Karvan. However this match didn't take place due to a decision by the Association of Football Federations of Azerbaijan about licensing, deciding that no clubs from the First Division would be promoted. This meant that Turan Tovuz kept their place for the 2012–13 Azerbaijan Premier League season.

== Squad ==
Note: Flags indicate national team as defined under FIFA eligibility rules; some limited exceptions apply. Players may hold more than one non-FIFA nationality.

No.	Pos.	Nation	Player
1	GK	AZE	Anar Nazirov (loan from Gabala)
4	DF	AZE	Seymur Tagiyev
6	DF	AZE	Kuvvat Amrahov
11	MF	GEO	Giorgi Beriashvili
14	MF	GEO	Aleksandr Gogoberishvili
16	MF	AZE	Orkhan Ismayilov
18	MF	AZE	Hafiz Aliyev
19	DF	AZE	Ruslan Abbasov
20	MF	AZE	Azer Mammadov
21	MF	AZE	Rashad Orujov
25	MF	AZE	Elmikhan Mammadov
30	GK	AZE	Ramil Karimov
33	MF	AZE	Budaq Nasirov
—	GK	AZE	Natiq Sahratov

No.	Pos.	Nation	Player
—	DF	AZE	Aftandil Hajiyev
—	DF	AZE	Javad Mirzayev
—	DF	TUR	Muammer Erdoğdu
—	MF	AZE	Aykhan Abbasov
—	MF	AZE	Farmayil Aliyev
—	MF	AZE	Rashid Hasanov
—	MF	AZE	Javid Tagiyev
—	MF	AZE	Khayal Garayev
—	MF	AZE	Asef Gadiri
—	MF	GHA	Seidu Salifu (loan from All Stars)
—	MF	MDA	Dan Pisla
—	FW	AZE	Rashad Piriyev
—	FW	AZE	Nadir Nabiyev

== Transfers ==
=== Summer ===
In: Note: Flags indicate national team as defined under FIFA eligibility rules; some limited exceptions apply. Players may hold more than one non-FIFA nationality.

No.	Pos.	Nation	Player
1	GK	AZE	Anar Nazirov (loan from (Azerbaijan) Gabala)
6	DF	MNE	Aleksandar Dubljević (from (Montenegro) Čelik Nikšić)
7	DF	AZE	Ramal Huseynov (from (Azerbaijan) Kəpəz)
14	MF	GEO	Aleksandr Gogoberishvili (from (Georgia (country)) Sioni)
15	MF	AZE	Namig Aliyev (from (Azerbaijan) Gabala)
17	FW	AZE	Samir Aliyev (from (Azerbaijan) Simurq)
19	DF	AZE	Ruslan Abbasov (from (Azerbaijan) FK Shamkir)
27	MF	GEO	Zura Dzamsashvili (from (Azerbaijan) Kəpəz)
—	GK	GER	Goksu Hasancik (from (Estonia) Tammeka Tartu)
—	GK	AZE	Zabid Safarov
—	DF	AZE	Aftandil Hajiyev (from (Azerbaijan) Qarabağ)
—	MF	AZE	Aykhan Abbasov (from (Azerbaijan) Qarabağ)
—	MF	AZE	Jamal Mammadov (from (Azerbaijan) Inter Baku)
—	MF	BRA	Rudison (from (France) Dieppe)
—	FW	UKR	Serhiy Artiukh (from (Ukraine) Zakarpattia Uzhhorod)

Out: Note: Flags indicate national team as defined under FIFA eligibility rules; some limited exceptions apply. Players may hold more than one non-FIFA nationality.

No.	Pos.	Nation	Player
—	GK	RUS	Shamil Saidov
—	GK	AZE	Kamal Bayramov (to (Azerbaijan) Khazar Lankaran)
—	DF	TUR	Muammer Erdoğdu (to (Azerbaijan) FC Kəpəz)
—	DF	AZE	Vurğun Hüseynov (to (Azerbaijan) FC Gabala)
—	DF	AZE	Elnur Abbasov (to (Azerbaijan) FC Kəpəz)
—	DF	AZE	Huseyn Isgandarov (to (Azerbaijan) Ravan Baku)
—	MF	AZE	Khayal Garayev (to (Azerbaijan) FC Kəpəz)
—	MF	GEO	Oleg Gvelesiani (to (Georgia (country)) Dila)
—	MF	BRA	Marco Tulio (to (Malaysia) PBDKT T-Team)
—	MF	RUS	Rashid Gasanov
—	FW	MDA	Victor Gonta (to (Moldova) FC Costuleni)
—	FW	BUL	Boris Kondev (to (Bulgaria) Montana)

=== Winter ===
In: Note: Flags indicate national team as defined under FIFA eligibility rules; some limited exceptions apply. Players may hold more than one non-FIFA nationality.

No.	Pos.	Nation	Player
—	MF	GHA	Seidu Salifu (loan from (Ghana) All Stars)
—	DF	AZE	Javad Mirzaev (from (Azerbaijan) FC Kəpəz)
—	DF	TUR	Muammer Erdoğdu (from (Azerbaijan) FC Kəpəz)
—	MF	AZE	Asef Gadiri (from (Azerbaijan) FC Kəpəz)
—	MF	AZE	Khayal Garayev (from (Azerbaijan) FC Kəpəz)
—	MF	MDA	Daniel Pisla (from (Moldova) Academia Chişinău)
—	FW	AZE	Emin Ibrahimov (from (Azerbaijan) Absheron)

Out: Note: Flags indicate national team as defined under FIFA eligibility rules; some limited exceptions apply. Players may hold more than one non-FIFA nationality.

No.	Pos.	Nation	Player
6	DF	MNE	Aleksandar Dubljević (to (Montenegro) Čelik Nikšić)
7	MF	AZE	Ramal Huseynov
8	MF	AZE	Akif Taghiyev (to (Azerbaijan) Khazar Lankaran)
9	FW	AZE	Yasin Abbasov (to (Azerbaijan) Sumgayit)
11	MF	AZE	Agshin Sadygov
15	MF	AZE	Namig Aliyev (to (Azerbaijan) FK Karvan)
17	FW	AZE	Samir Aliyev (Retired)
20	MF	AZE	Maharram Muslumzade (to (Azerbaijan) Ravan Baku)
25	MF	BUL	Martin Kerchev (to (Albania) Teuta Durrës)
26	MF	GEO	Georgi Chedia (to (Georgia (country)) Metalurgi Rustavi)
27	MF	GEO	Zurab Dzamsashvili (to (Georgia (country)) Chikhura Sachkhere)
28	FW	AZE	Tugay Alhuseynli
—	GK	GER	Goksu Hasancik
—	DF	AZE	Ruslan Namazov (to (Azerbaijan) FK Neftchala)
—	MF	BRA	Rudison
—	MF	AZE	Jamal Mammadov (to (Azerbaijan) FK Karvan)
—	FW	UKR	Serhiy Artiukh (to (Azerbaijan) Ravan Baku)

== Competitions ==
=== Azerbaijan Premier League ===
==== Results summary ====
Overall								Home						Away					
Pld	W	D	L	GF	GA	GD	Pts	W	D	L	GF	GA	GD	W	D	L	GF	GA	GD
22	3	2	17	13	33	−20	11	3	1	7	5	9	−4	0	1	10	8	24	−16

Last updated: 21 December 2011.
Source: Soccerway

==== Results by round ====
Round	1	2	3	4	5	6	7	8	9	10	11	12	13	14	15	16	17	18	19	20	21	22
Ground	A	H	A	H	A	H	H	A	H	H	A	H	A	A	H	A	H	A	A	A	H	H
Result	L	W	L	W	L	L	L	L	D	W	L	L	L	D	L	L	L	L	L	L	L	L
Position																		12	12	12	12	12

Source: Soccerway
A = Away; H = Home; W = Win; D = Draw; L = Loss

==== Results ====
6 August 2011 1	Inter Baku	1–0	Turan	Shafa Stadium
	Abdulov 54'	Summary		Attendance: 500

14 August 2011 2	Turan	3–1	Kəpəz	Tovuz City Stadium
	Dzamsashvili 24'; Artiukh 55' (pen.), 80'	Summary	Sultanov 5'

20 August 2011 3	Khazar	3–1	Turan	Lankaran City Stadium
	Subašić 33', 58'; Ricardo 59'	Summary	Nabiyev 86'	Attendance: 8,000

27 September 2011 4	Turan	1–0	Simurq	Tovuz City Stadium
17:30 AZST (UTC+5)	Artiukh 37'	Summary		Attendance: 6,000; Referee: Anar Salmanov

11 September 2011 5	Gabala	2–1	Turan	Gabala City Stadium
	Mendy 15'; Mendy 54'	Summary	Artyukh 6'	Attendance: 2,050; Referee: Elchin Mammadov

17 September 2011 6	Turan	0–2	Baku	Tovuz City Stadium
		Summary	Parks 43'; Hajiyev 90'

23 September 2011 7	Turan	0–1	Ravan Baku	Tovuz City Stadium
		Summary	Igor Souza 60'

30 September 2011 8	Qarabağ	3–1	Turan	Guzanli Olympic Stadium
	Nadirov 23'; Agolli 53'; Sadygov 85'	Summary	Aliyev 52'

15 October 2011 9	Turan	0–0	AZAL	Tovuz City Stadium
	Beriashvili (red card) 45'	Summary

21 October 2011 10	Turan	1–0	Sumgayit	Tovuz City Stadium
	Artiukh 30' (pen.)	Summary

29 October 2011 11	Neftchi	1–0	Turan	Dalga Arena
	Nasimov 90'	Summary		Attendance: 300; Referee: Jeyhun Hashimov

6 November 2011 12	Turan	0–1	Inter Baku	Tovuz City Stadium
		Summary	Hajiyev 8'	Attendance: 2,500

19 November 2011 13	Baku	5–0	Turan	Tofig Bahramov Stadium
	Ivanovs 15'; Juninho 28', 87'; Parks 39'; Šolić 44'	Summary

25 November 2011 14	Kəpəz	1–1	Turan	Ganja City Stadium
	Junivan 25'	Summary	S.Tagiyev 90'

4 December 2011 15	Turan	0–1	Qarabağ	Tovuz City Stadium
	Abbasov (yellow card) 63' (yellow-red card) 70'	Summary	Soltanov 4'

10 December 2011 16	Simurq	2–1	Turan	Zaqatala City Stadium
16:00 AZST (UTC+5)	Gogoberishvili 74' (o.g.); Poškus 81'	Summary	A.Taghiyev 90'	Attendance: 1,200; Referee: Elvin Äsgärov

14 December 2011 17	Turan	0–1	Gabala	Tovuz City Stadium
		Summary	Dodo 67'; Mammadov (red card) 81'	Attendance: 1,000

21 December 2011 18	Sumgayit	1–0	Turan	Mehdi Huseynzade Stadium
	Abbasov 70'	Summary	Muslumzade (yellow card) 26' (yellow-red card) 68'

15 February 2012 19	Ravan Baku	2–1	Turan	Dalga Arena
	Vidaković 17', 45'	Summary	Tagiyev 45'

21 February 2012 20	AZAL	3–2	Turan	AZAL Stadium
	Benouahi 1', 71'; Boghiu 78'	Summary	Nabiyev 38'; Huseynov 90'

3 March 2012 21	Turan	0–1	Neftchi	Tovuz City Stadium
		Summary	Abdullayev 75'

7 March 2012 22	Turan	0–1	Khazar	Tovuz City Stadium
		Summary	Abbasov 3' (o.g.)

==== League table ====
Pos	Team	Pld	W	D	L	GF	GA	GD	Pts	Qualification
8	Ravan Baku	22	6	7	9	23	29	−6	25	Qualification for relegation group
9	Kapaz	22	6	4	12	26	38	−12	22	Qualification for relegation group
10	Simurq	22	5	4	13	18	34	−16	19	Qualification for relegation group
11	Sumgayit	22	4	3	15	16	37	−21	15	Qualification for relegation group
12	Turan	22	3	2	17	13	33	−20	11	Qualification for relegation group

Source: Soccerway: Azerbaijan Premier League Table
Rules for classification: 1) points; 2) goal difference; 3) number of goals scored.

=== Azerbaijan Premier League Relegation Group ===
==== Results ====
11 March 2012 23	Turan	3–0	AZAL	Tovuz City Stadium
14:00 AZT (UTC+4)	Erdoğdu 10'; Agamammadli 16' (o.g.); Islamov 48' (o.g.)	Summary		Attendance: 800; Referee: Faud Hasanov

17 March 2012 24	Simurq	1–1	Turan	Zaqatala City Stadium
16:00 AZT (UTC+4)	Tarasovs 63'	Summary	Hajiyev (red card) 73'; Gogoberishvili 90' (pen.)	Attendance: 500; Referee: Orkhan Mammadov

25 March 2012 25	Turan Tovuz	2–1	Ravan Baku	Tovuz City Stadium
15:00 AZT (UTC+4)	Mammadov 45+1'; Beriashvili 58'	Summary	Novruzov 45'; Novruzov (yellow card) 61' (yellow-red card) 73'	Attendance: 1,500; Referee: Elvin Askerov

1 April 2012 26	Sumgayit	1–1	Turan	Mehdi Huseynzade Stadium
14:00 AZT (UTC+4)	Nurahmadov 28'	Summary	Beriashvili 45+2'	Attendance: 500; Referee: Vusal Aliyev

7 April 2012 27	Turan	2–0	Kəpəz	Tovuz City Stadium
16:00 AZT (UTC+4)	Mammadov 2'; Gogoberishvili 28' (pen.)	Summary		Attendance: 3,500; Referee: Elvin Askerov

15 April 2012 28	Turan	0–0	Simurq	Tovuz City Stadium
16:00 AZT (UTC+4)		Summary		Attendance: 4,000; Referee: Fariz Yusifov

21 April 2012 29	Ravan Baku	2–2	Turan	Dalga Arena
16:00 AZT (UTC+4)	Novruzov 54' (pen.); Novruzov (yellow card) 44' (red card) 60'; Zečević 83' (pen.)	Summary	Beriashvili 84'; Gogoberishvili 88' (pen.)	Attendance: 100; Referee: Anar Salmanov

28 April 2012 30	Turan	1–1	Sumgayit	Tovuz City Stadium
16:00 AZT (UTC+4)	Gogoberishvili 69' (pen.)	Summary	Aliyev 59'	Attendance: 1,000; Referee: Elchin Mämmädov

6 May 2012 31	Kəpəz	2–1	Turan	Ganja City Stadium
17:30 AZST (UTC+5)	Sultanov 43' (pen.); Junivan 76'	Summary	Nabiyev 62'	Attendance: 1,500; Referee: Vusal Aliyev

12 May 2012 32	AZAL	1–0	Turan	AZAL Arena
17:30 AZST (UTC+5)	Safiyaroglu 10'; Schutz (yellow card) 35' (yellow-red card) 75'	Summary		Attendance: 100; Referee: Elvin Askerov

==== Table ====
Pos	Team	Pld	W	D	L	GF	GA	GD	Pts	Qualification or relegation
7	AZAL	32	12	8	12	44	44	0	44	
8	Ravan Baku	32	10	11	11	39	39	0	41	
9	Simurq	32	8	10	14	27	41	−14	34	
10	Kapaz	32	9	5	18	35	55	−20	32	
11	Turan (R)	32	6	7	19	26	42	−16	25	Qualification for relegation playoffs
12	Sumgayit (R)	32	6	6	20	27	52	−25	24	Relegation to Azerbaijan First Division

Source: Soccerway.com
Rules for classification: 1) points; 2) goal difference; 3) number of goals scored.
(R) Relegated

=== 2011-12 Azerbaijan Cup Results ===
30 November 2011 First Round	Inter Baku	3–0^{1}	Turan	Shafa Stadium
		Summary

Notes

- Match Abandoned after Turan refused to restart the game after conceding a disputed goal, Match awarded 3-0

== Squad statistics ==
=== Appearances and goals ===
As of 14 May 2012

No.	Pos	Nat	Player	Total		Premier League		Azerbaijan Cup	
No.	Pos	Nat	Player	Apps	Goals	Apps	Goals	Apps	Goals
1	GK	(Azerbaijan) AZE	Anar Nazirov	26	0	26+0	0	0+0	0
4	DF	(Azerbaijan) AZE	Seymur Tagiyev	14	1	11+3	1	0+0	0
6	DF	(Azerbaijan) AZE	Kuvvat Amrahov	1	0	0+1	0	0+0	0
11	MF	(Georgia (country)) GEO	Giorgi Beriashvili	20	3	18+2	3	0+0	0
14	MF	(Georgia (country)) GEO	Aleksandr Gogoberishvili	30	4	28+2	4	0+0	0
16	DF	(Azerbaijan) AZE	Orkhan Ismayilov	4	0	1+3	0	0+0	0
18	MF	(Azerbaijan) AZE	Hafiz Aliyev	20	0	18+2	0	0+0	0
19	DF	(Azerbaijan) AZE	Ruslan Abbasov	11	0	9+2	0	0+0	0
20	MF	(Azerbaijan) AZE	Azer Mammadov	22	1	14+8	1	0+0	0
21	MF	(Azerbaijan) AZE	Rashad Orujov	24	0	22+2	0	0+0	0
30	GK	(Azerbaijan) AZE	Ramil Karimov	4	0	3+1	0	0+0	0
	GK	(Azerbaijan) AZE	Natik Sahratov	2	0	2+0	0	0+0	0
	DF	(Azerbaijan) AZE	Aftandil Hajiyev	20	0	20+0	0	0+0	0
	DF	(Azerbaijan) AZE	Javad Mirzayev	5	0	4+1	0	0+0	0
	MF	(Ghana) GHA	Seidu Salifu	2	0	2+0	0	0+0	0
	DF	(Turkey) TUR	Muammer Erdoğdu	9	1	9+0	1	0+0	0
	MF	(Azerbaijan) AZE	Aykhan Abbasov	16	0	16+0	0	0+0	0
	MF	(Azerbaijan) AZE	Farmayil Aliyev	12	0	8+4	0	0+0	0
	MF	(Azerbaijan) AZE	Rashid Hasanov	6	0	4+2	0	0+0	0
	MF	(Azerbaijan) AZE	Javid Tagiyev	16	1	15+1	1	0+0	0
	MF	(Azerbaijan) AZE	Khayal Garayev	8	0	6+2	0	0+0	0
	MF	(Azerbaijan) AZE	Asef Gadiri	4	0	0+4	0	0+0	0
	MF	(Moldova) MDA	Daniel Pisla	12	0	10+2	0	0+0	0
	FW	(Azerbaijan) AZE	Rashad Piriyev	10	0	2+8	0	0+0	0
	FW	(Azerbaijan) AZE	Nadir Nabiyev	20	3	13+7	3	0+0	0
Players who appeared for Turan Tovuz who left during the season:
	GK	(Germany) GER	Goksu Hasancik	1	0	1+0	0	0+0	0
6	DF	(Montenegro) MNE	Aleksandar Dubljević	7	0	7+0	0	0+0	0
7	MF	(Azerbaijan) AZE	Ramal Huseynov	16	1	16+0	1	0+0	0
8	MF	(Azerbaijan) AZE	Akif Tagiyev	3	1	3+0	1	0+0	0
9	FW	(Azerbaijan) AZE	Yasin Abbasov	13	0	6+7	0	0+0	0
11	MF	(Azerbaijan) AZE	Agshin Sadygov	1	0	0+1	0	0+0	0
15	DF	(Azerbaijan) AZE	Namig Aliyev	11	1	7+4	1	0+0	0
17	FW	(Azerbaijan) AZE	Samir Aliyev	2	0	1+1	0	0+0	0
22	MF	(Azerbaijan) AZE	Maharram Muslumzade	12	0	12+0	0	0+0	0
25	MF	(Azerbaijan) AZE	Elmikhan Mammadov	1	0	0+1	0	0+0	0
25	MF	(Bulgaria) BUL	Martin Kerchev	1	0	0+1	0	0+0	0
26	MF	(Georgia (country)) GEO	Giorgi Chedia	1	0	0+1	0	0+0	0
27	MF	(Georgia (country)) GEO	Zurab Dzamsashvili	14	1	13+1	1	0+0	0
28	FW	(Azerbaijan) AZE	Tugay Alhuseynli	3	0	1+2	0	0+0	0
33	MF	(Azerbaijan) AZE	Budaq Nasirov	1	0	0+1	0	0+0	0
	MF	(Brazil) BRA	Rudison	11	0	10+1	0	0+0	0
	MF	(Azerbaijan) AZE	Jamal Mammadov	2	0	1+1	0	0+0	0
	FW	(Ukraine) UKR	Serhiy Artiukh	13	5	13+0	5	0+0	0

=== Goal scorers ===
Place	Position	Nation	Number	Name	Premier League	Azerbaijan Cup	Total
1	FW	(Ukraine)		Serhiy Artiukh	5	0	5
2	MF	(Georgia (country))	14	Aleksandr Gogoberishvili	4	0	4
3	MF	(Georgia (country))	11	Giorgi Beriashvili	3	0	3
3	FW	(Azerbaijan)		Nadir Nabiev	3	0	3
5				Own goal	2	0	2
5	MF	(Azerbaijan)	20	Azer Mammadov	2	0	2
7	DF	(Azerbaijan)	4	Seymur Tagiyev	1	0	1
7	MF	(Georgia (country))	27	Zura Dzamsashvili	1	0	1
7	MF	(Azerbaijan)	15	Namig Aliyev	1	0	1
7	MF	(Azerbaijan)	8	Akif Taghiyev	1	0	1
7	MF	(Azerbaijan)		Javid Tagiyev	1	0	1
7	MF	(Azerbaijan)	7	Ramal Huseynov	1	0	1
7	DF	(Turkey)		Muammer Erdoğdu	1	0	1
				TOTALS	26	0	26

=== Disciplinary record ===
Number	Nation	Position	Name	Premier League		Azerbaijan Cup		Total	
Number	Nation	Position	Name	Yellow card	Red card	Yellow card	Red card	Yellow card	Red card
1	(Azerbaijan)	GK	Anar Nazirov	5	0	0	0	5	0
4	(Azerbaijan)	DF	Seymur Tagiyev	5	0	0	0	5	0
7	(Azerbaijan)	MF	Ramal Huseynov	5	0	0	0	5	0
8	(Azerbaijan)	MF	Akif Tagiyev	2	0	0	0	2	0
9	(Azerbaijan)	FW	Yasin Abbasov	2	0	0	0	2	0
11	(Georgia (country))	MF	Georgi Beriashvili	7	0	0	0	7	1
14	(Georgia (country))	MF	Aleksandr Gogoberishvili	6	0	0	0	6	0
15	(Azerbaijan)	DF	Namig Aliyev	4	0	0	0	4	0
18	(Azerbaijan)	MF	Hafiz Aliyev	4	0	0	0	4	0
19	(Azerbaijan)	DF	Ruslan Abbasov	3	0	0	0	3	1
20	(Azerbaijan)	FW	Azer Mammadov	6	0	0	0	6	0
22	(Azerbaijan)	MF	Maharram Muslumzade	5	1	0	0	5	1
27	(Georgia (country))	MF	Zura Dzamsashvili	6	0	0	0	6	0
	(Azerbaijan)	DF	Javad Mirzayev	2	0	0	0	2	0
	(Azerbaijan)	DF	Aftandil Hajiyev	1	1	0	0	1	1
	(Ghana)	MF	Seidu Salifu	1	0	0	0	1	0
	(Turkey)	DF	Muammer Erdoğdu	1	0	0	0	1	0
	(Azerbaijan)	MF	Aykhan Abbasov	5	0	0	0	5	0
	(Azerbaijan)	MF	Farmayil Aliyev	2	0	0	0	2	0
	(Brazil)	MF	Rudison	1	0	0	0	1	0
	(Azerbaijan)	MF	Jamal Mammadov	1	0	0	0	1	0
	(Azerbaijan)	FW	Nadir Nabiyev	2	0	0	0	2	0
			TOTALS	'74	4	0	0	'74	4
