= Seidu Salifu =

Ghanaian footballer

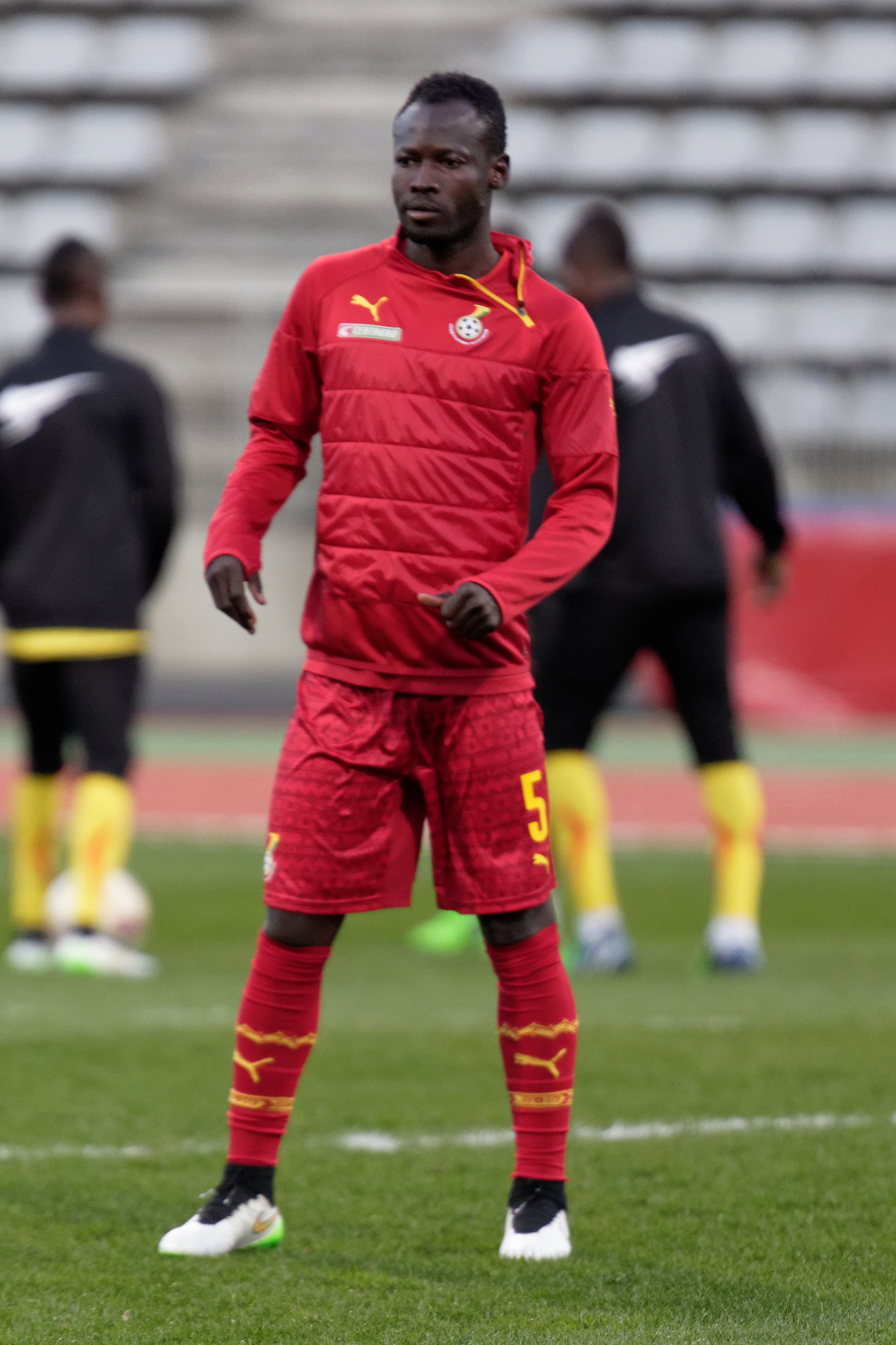
- Salifu with Ghana in 2015

Personal information
- Full name: Seidu Salifu
- Date of birth: 30 November 1993 (age 32)
- Place of birth: Tamale, Ghana
- Height: 1.80 m (5 ft 11 in)
- Position: Midfielder

Senior career*
Years	Team	Apps	(Gls)
2010–2013	All Stars	16	(10)
2011	→ Turan-Tovuz (loan)	2	(0)
2013–2016	Club Africain	34	(1)
2016	Inter Allies	1	(0)
2016–2017	Adana Demirspor	1	(0)
2017	Ümraniyespor	9	(0)

International career
2013	Ghana U20	11	(2)
Medal record
Runner-up	Africa U-20 Cup of Nations	2013
Third place	FIFA U-20 World Cup	2013
- * Club domestic league appearances and goals as of 25 January 2017

Seidu Salifu is a Ghanaian footballer who last played for Ümraniyespor in Turkey after a short spell at Adana Demirspor Formerly of Club Africain in the Tunisian Ligue Professionnelle 1, he plays as a midfielder. In 2013, coach Sellas Tetteh called him up to be a member of the Ghana Under 20 national team for the 2013 African Youth Championship in Algeria, and he was a member of the Ghana Under 20 national team for the 2013 FIFA U-20 World Cup in Turkey. In March 2015, he got his debut call up into Ghana national football team.

== Career ==
=== Early career ===
Salifu began his youth career playing for Tamale Young Kotoko in the Ghana Juvenile Association Colts League.

=== Club career ===
Salifu came to prominence in 2010 when he moved to All Stars F.C. He had a remarkable three-year spell at the club especially in 2012 and after his success in the games of the 2013 African U-20 Championship qualification, Salifu was highly sought after by top teams in Ghana including Asante Kotoko SC. After playing a key role for the Black Satellites at the FIFA U-20 Championship 2013 in Turkey he moved to the Tunisian side Club Africain. In July 2015, Salifu turned down a trial with Bundesliga side Hamburger SV. On 27 August 2016, Seidu Salifu agreed terms to play for Adana Demirspor in Turkey and managed just one league appearance. Salifu joined Ümraniyespor after six months

== International career ==
=== African Youth Championship ===
Salifu was part of the Ghana Under-20 national team during the qualification rounds for the 2013 African U-20 Championship. In 2013, coach Sellas Tetteh called him up for the Ghana Under-20 national team for the 2013 tournament in Algeria. During the competition he scored from a long distance in the group match game against Algeria.

=== FIFA U-20 Championship, Turkey 2013 ===
Salifu was a member of the Ghana Under-20 national team that took part and in the 2013 FIFA U-20 tournament in Turkey. He scored one of Ghana's goal in the 4–3 win over Chile in the quarter-finals.

=== Ghana national team ===
In March 2015, Salifu was called up to the Ghana squad to face Senegal national football team and Mali national football team.

== Career statistics ==
As of match played 20 May 2017

Appearances and goals by club, season and competition
Club	Season	League			National Cup		Continental		Total	
Club	Season	Division	Apps	Goals	Apps	Goals	Apps	Goals	Apps	Goals
Turan Tovuz (loan)	2011–12	Azerbaijan Premier League	2	0	0	0	–		2	0
Club Africain	2013–14	CLP-1	5	0	0	0	–		5	0
Club Africain	2014–15	CLP-1	26	1	0	0	–		26	1
Club Africain	2015–16	CLP-1	3	0	0	0	–		3	0
Club Africain	Total		34	1	0	0	-	-	34	1
Inter Allies	2016	Ghanaian Premier League	1	0	0	0	–		1	0
Adana Demirspor	2016–17	TFF First League	1	0	0	0	–		1	0
Ümraniyespor	2016–17	TFF First League	9	0	2	0	–		11	0
Career total			47	1	2	0	-	-	49	1

== Honours ==
=== Club ===
Club Africain

- Tunisian Ligue Professionnelle 1 (1): 2014–15

=== International ===
Ghana

- U-20 World Cup: Third Place 2013
- African Youth Championship: Runners up 2013
