= Vasili Yanotovsky =

Russian footballer

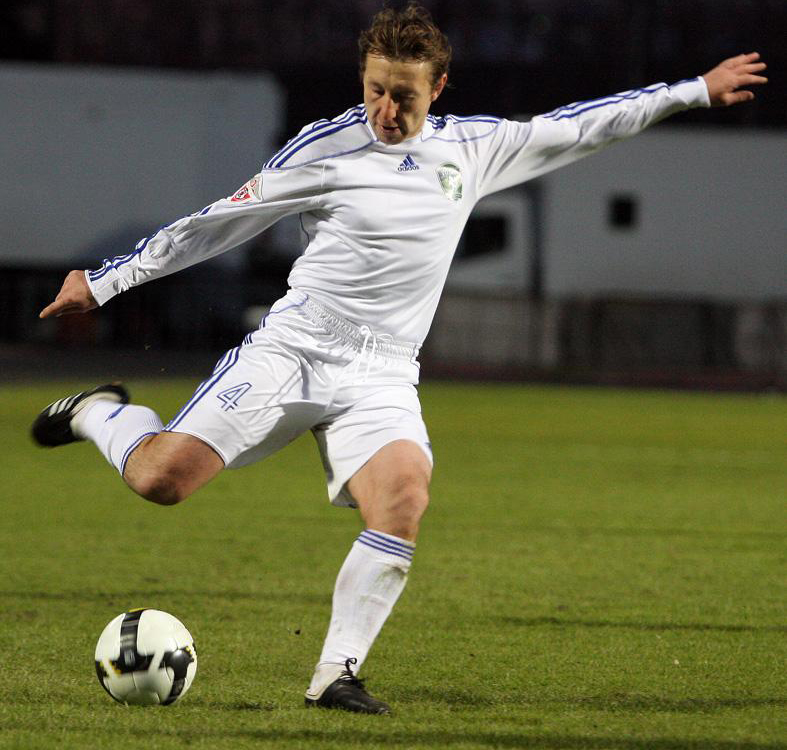

Personal information
- Full name: Vasili Grigoryevich Yanotovsky
- Date of birth: 2 January 1976 (age 50)
- Place of birth: Pervomaysky, Chita Oblast, Soviet Union
- Height: 1.76 m (5 ft 9 in)
- Position: Midfielder

Senior career*
Years	Team	Apps	(Gls)
1994–1998	FC Zarya Leninsk-Kuznetsky	124	(6)
1999–2010	FC Tom Tomsk	244	(3)
2010	FC SKA-Energiya Khabarovsk	16	(0)
2011	FC KUZBASS Kemerovo	16	(0)
2011–2012	Simurq PFC	28	(0)
2013	FC Vybor Odintsovo		
2014–2017	FC Odintsovo		
- * Club domestic league appearances and goals

Vasili Grigoryevich Yanotovsky (Russian: Василий Григорьевич Янотовский; born 2 January 1976) is a Russian former footballer.

== Career statistics ==
=== Club ===
Club performance			League		Cup		Continental		Total	
Season	Club	League	Apps	Goals	Apps	Goals	Apps	Goals	Apps	Goals
2011-12	Simurq	Azerbaijan Premier League	28	0	1	0	-		29	0
Total	Azerbaijan		28	0	1	0	-		29	0
Career total			28	0	1	0	-		29	0
