= 2011–12 Azerbaijan Premier League =

Azerbaijan Premier League
- Season: 2011–12
- Champions: Neftchi (7th title)
- Champions League: Neftchi
- Europa League: Baku; Khazar; Inter Baku
- Matches: 192
- Goals: 448 (2.33 per match)
- Top goalscorer: Bahodir Nasimov (16 goals)
- Biggest home win: Neftchi 7-1 AZAL
- Biggest away win: Ravan 0-4 Gabala
- Highest scoring: AZAL 6-3 Sumgayit
- Highest attendance: 15,000; Kəpəz 3–1 AZAL
- Lowest attendance: 300 FK Baku 0–3 Kəpəz; FK Baku 3–2 Ravan
- Average attendance: 3,581

The 2011–12 Azerbaijan Premier League (known as the Unibank Premyer Liqası for sponsorship reasons) was the twentieth season of the Premier League since its establishment in 1992. Neftchi Baku was the defending champions, having won their second Azerbaijani championship the previous season.

The twelve teams participating in the league included the ten sides remaining from the 2010–11 season, one promoted club from the 2010–11 Azerbaijan First Division and a totally new club instead of the defunct First Division champions FC Absheron. The format of the league was the same as in the 2010–11 season.

There is only one change in season's regulation as only champion of 2011–12 Azerbaijan First Division was directly promoted, while runners up of first division played play-off game with the team that finished 11th in Azerbaijan Premier League.

== Teams ==
MOIK Baku were relegated to the Azerbaijan First Division after finishing 12th and last, at the end of last season. They were replaced by First Division champions FC Absheron and runners-up Ravan Baku. However, due sponsorship problems Absheron became defunct and replaced by Sumgayit City F.C.

On 31 May 2011, it was announced that FK Ganja changed their name to FC Kəpəz. On 18 July 2011, FK Mughan also ruled out to participate in this season due sponsorship reasons and replaced by Simurq PFC.

=== Stadia and locations ===
Location of teams in 2011-12 Azerbaijan Premier League

Team	Location	Venue	Capacity
AZAL	Baku	AZAL Stadium	3,000
FK Baku	Baku	Tofig Bahramov Stadium	30,000
Gabala	Gabala	Gabala City Stadium	2,000
Inter	Baku	Shafa Stadium	8,150
Kəpəz	Ganja	Ganja City Stadium	25,000
Khazar	Lankaran	Lankaran City Stadium	15,000
Neftchi	Baku	Tofig Bahramov Stadium	30,000
Qarabağ	Aghdam	Guzanli Olympic Stadium	2,000
Ravan Baku	Baku	Dalga Arena	6,500
Simurq	Zaqatala	Zaqatala City Stadium	3,500
Sumgayit	Sumqayit	Mehdi Huseynzade Stadium	16,000
Turan	Tovuz	Tovuz City Stadium	6,800

=== Personnel and sponsoring ===
Team	Manager	Team captain	Kit manufacturer	Shirt sponsor
AZAL	(Azerbaijan) Vagif Sadygov	(Azerbaijan) Agil Nabiyev	Umbro	Silk Way
FC Baku	(Azerbaijan) Novruz Azimov	(Azerbaijan) Jamshid Maharramov	Macron	
Gabala	(Turkey) Fatih Kavlak	(Azerbaijan) Mahir Shukurov	Erreà	Hyundai
Inter	(Georgia (country)) Kakhaber Tskhadadze	(Azerbaijan) Vladimir Levin	Umbro	IBA
Kəpəz	(Azerbaijan) Fuad Ismayilov	(Azerbaijan) Azer Mammadov	Adidas	Nakhchivan Car Factory
Khazar	(Azerbaijan) Yunis Hüseynov	(Azerbaijan) Rahid Amirguliev	Puma	Palmali
Neftchi	(Azerbaijan) Boyukagha Hajiyev	(Azerbaijan) Rail Malikov	Adidas	SOCAR
Qarabağ	(Azerbaijan) Gurban Gurbanov	(Azerbaijan) Rashad Sadigov	Kappa	Azersun
Ravan Baku	(Azerbaijan) Bahman Hasanov	(Serbia) Miloš Zečević	Legea	Nissan
Simurq	(Georgia (country)) Giorgi Chikhradze	(Azerbaijan) Rasim Ramaldanov	Kappa	
Sumgayit	(Germany) Bernhard Raab	(Azerbaijan) Samir Abbasov	Kappa	Azerkimya
Turan	(Azerbaijan) Asgar Abdullayev	(Azerbaijan) Aftandil Hajiyev	Kappa	SivArt TV PLUS

=== Managerial changes ===
Team	Outgoing manager	Manner of departure	Date of vacancy	Position in table	Replaced by	Date of appointment
AZAL	(Azerbaijan) Nazim Suleymanov	Resigned	7 July 2011	Pre-season	(Azerbaijan) Elkhan Abdullayev	12 July 2011
Neftchi	(Azerbaijan) Arif Asadov	Resigned	29 July 2011	Pre-season	(Azerbaijan) Boyukagha Hajiyev	2 August 2011
Ravan Baku	(Azerbaijan) Bahman Hasanov	Resigned	20 September 2011	11th	(Azerbaijan) Vladislav Kadyrov	20 September 2011
AZAL	(Azerbaijan) Elkhan Abdullayev	Resigned	31 October 2011	10th	(Azerbaijan) Rafig Mirzayev	1 November 2011
Gabala	(England) Tony Adams	Resigned	16 November 2011	6th	(Turkey) Fatih Kavlak	16 November 2011
Kapaz	(Azerbaijan) Mehman Allahverdiyev	Resigned	21 November 2011	10th	(Azerbaijan) Mirbaghir Isayev	21 November 2011
Khazar Lankaran	(Romania) Mircea Rednic	Sacked	4 December 2011	3rd	(Turkey) Cüneyt Biçer	5 December 2011
Kapaz	(Azerbaijan) Mirbaghir Isayev	Resigned	24 December 2011	10th	(Azerbaijan) Fuad Ismayilov	1 January 2012
Ravan Baku	(Azerbaijan) Vladislav Kadyrov	Sacked	5 February 2012	8th	(Azerbaijan) Bahman Hasanov	6 February 2012
Simurq	(Russia) Sergey Yuran	Mutually terminated	5 March 2012	10th	(Azerbaijan) Igor Getman	5 March 2012
Simurq	(Azerbaijan) Igor Getman	End of tenure as caretaker	11 March 2012	10th	(Georgia (country)) Giorgi Chikhradze	11 March 2012
FC Baku	(Latvia) Aleksandrs Starkovs	Mutually terminated	11 March 2012	5th	(Azerbaijan) Novruz Azimov	11 March 2012
Khazar Lankaran	(Turkey) Cüneyt Biçer	Sacked	15 March 2012	4th	(Azerbaijan) Yunis Hüseynov	15 March 2012
AZAL	(Azerbaijan) Rafig Mirzayev	Mutually terminated	2 April 2012	7th	(Azerbaijan) Mais Azimov	2 April 2012
AZAL	(Azerbaijan) Mais Azimov	End of tenure as caretaker	6 April 2012	7th	(Azerbaijan) Vagif Sadygov	6 April 2012

== Season events ==
=== Inter Baku scandal ===
On 21 August 2011, Inter Baku - FK Baku game was suspended during last minutes due referee scandal, therefore game's fate decided after Professional Football League of Azerbaijan's decision. On 23 August 2011, PFL awarded 3-0 technical victory to FK Baku and announced the following punishments were given to Inter Baku's individuals:

- Georgi Nikolov, club's chairman: 5 game ban from football and fined 5,000 AZN.
- Kakhaber Tskhadadze: fined 1,000 AZN.
- Giorgi Lomaia: 2 game ban and fined 2,000 AZN.

Furthermore, Inter Baku fined additional 13,000 AZN for breaching security regulations.

=== Khazar Lankaran and Turan controversy ===
On 6 August 2011, the Disciplinary Committee of AFFA imposed the punishment on the scandal that took place in two matches. Khazar Lankaran fined 10,000 AZN after club's fans threw alien objects to the court, injuring the head of Inter Baku's coach Kakhaber Tskhadadze. Khazar also must play its next two league home matches in an empty stadium because of its fans' aggressive behavior.

AFFA fined Turan Tovuz 26,000 AZN and moved its next two league home matches on a neutral ground for injuring referees, breaking PFL camera as well as for refusing to play at the second half of 2011–12 Azerbaijan Cup. The club's president Musa Suleymanov has been disqualified for five matches and club received technical defeat of 0-3.

== First round ==
=== League table ===
Pos	Team	Pld	W	D	L	GF	GA	GD	Pts	Qualification
1	Neftçi Baku	22	16	1	5	45	17	+28	49	Qualification for championship group
2	Inter Baku	22	13	6	3	21	10	+11	45	Qualification for championship group
3	Khazar Lankaran	22	13	5	4	33	19	+14	44	Qualification for championship group
4	Qarabağ	22	12	5	5	27	14	+13	41	Qualification for championship group
5	Baku	22	10	5	7	27	22	+5	35	Qualification for championship group
6	Gabala	22	10	5	7	27	23	+4	35	Qualification for championship group
7	AZAL	22	8	5	9	35	35	0	29	Qualification for relegation group
8	Ravan Baku	22	6	7	9	23	29	−6	25	Qualification for relegation group
9	Kapaz	22	6	4	12	26	38	−12	22	Qualification for relegation group
10	Simurq	22	5	4	13	18	34	−16	19	Qualification for relegation group
11	Sumgayit	22	4	3	15	16	37	−21	15	Qualification for relegation group
12	Turan	22	3	2	17	13	33	−20	11	Qualification for relegation group

Source: Soccerway: Azerbaijan Premier League Table
Rules for classification: 1) points; 2) goal difference; 3) number of goals scored.

=== Results ===
Home \ Away	AZL	BAK	KAP	INT	KHA	SIM	NEF	QAR	GAB	RAV	SUM	TUR
AZAL		1–0	2–0	1–1	0–3	5–1	3–1	1–3	3–0	1–2	6–3	3–2
Baku	0–0		0–3	1–0	2–2	0–0	1–3	0–3	2–1	3–2	1–0	5–0
Kapaz	3–1	1–3		0–1	1–4	2–0	1–1	1–2	3–2	3–2	1–1	1–1
Inter Baku	1–1	0–3	0–0		1–0	1–0	2–1	0–0	1–1	1–0	2–0	1–0
Khazar Lankaran	1–0	3–0	1–0	0–1		1–0	1–0	0–0	2–1	1–1	2–1	3–1
Simurq	0–3	0–2	4–2	0–2	2–2		1–2	0–1	0–1	1–1	1–0	2–1
Neftçi Baku	7–1	1–0	2–0	0–1	5–0	4–2		3–2	2–0	1–0	4–0	1–0
Qarabağ	1–0	2–1	1–0	1–0	0–1	2–0	1–2		0–1	2–0	1–2	3–1
Gabala	1–1	0–0	2–0	0–0	2–1	0–2	1–0	0–0		2–3	3–1	2–1
Ravan Baku	3–1	0–0	1–2	1–2	1–1	1–1	0–1	1–1	0–4		0–0	2–1
Sumgayit	2–1	0–1	4–1	0–2	0–3	0–1	0–3	0–0	1–2	0–1		1–0
Turan	0–0	0–2	3–1	0–1	0–1	1–0	0–1	0–1	0–1	0–1	1–0	

Source: Soccerway
Legend: Blue = home team win; Yellow = draw; Red = away team win.

== Second round ==
=== Championship group ===
The top six teams of the first phase participate in this group, which will decide which team will win the championship. Additionally, teams in this group compete for one 2012–13 Champions League and two Europa League spots.

The winners will qualify for the Champions League Second qualifying round, with the runners-up and third place team earning a spot in the Europa League first qualifying round.

==== Table ====
Pos	Team	Pld	W	D	L	GF	GA	GD	Pts	Qualification or relegation
1	Neftçi Baku (C)	32	20	3	9	55	30	+25	63	Qualification for Champions League second qualifying round
2	Khazar Lankaran	32	17	8	7	44	28	+16	59	Qualification for Europa League first qualifying round (Note: Baku qualified for the first qualifiying round of the 2012–13 UEFA Europa League as winner of the 2011–12 Azerbaijan Cup.)
3	Inter Baku	32	16	8	8	29	21	+8	56	Qualification for Europa League first qualifying round
4	Qarabağ	32	15	8	9	37	28	+9	53	
5	Gabala	32	15	7	10	43	32	+11	52	
6	Baku	32	15	5	12	42	37	+5	50	Qualification for Europa League first qualifying round

Source: Soccerway.com
Rules for classification: 1) points; 2) goal difference; 3) number of goals scored.
(C) Champions

==== Results ====
Home \ Away	BAK	INT	KHA	NEF	QAR	GAB
Baku		0–1	4–1	2–0	1–2	2–1
Inter Baku	1–0		0–0	1–2	1–1	2–1
Khazar Lankaran	0–1	2–0		1–0	4–1	1–1
Neftçi Baku	2–1	2–1	1–1		2–1	0–1
Qarabağ	2–4	1–0	1–0	0–0		1–1
Gabala	4–0	2–1	0–1	4–1	1–0	

Source: Soccerway
Legend: Blue = home team win; Yellow = draw; Red = away team win.

=== Relegation group ===
The bottom six teams of the first phase will determine the teams to be relegated to the 2012–13 Azerbaijan First Division. The bottom team of this group will be directly relegated, while the fifth-placed team will have to compete in relegation/promotion playoffs with the second-placed teams of the 2011–12 Azerbaijan First Division. On April 30, due decision of Association of Football Federations of Azerbaijan, no clubs from Azerbaijan First Division will be promoted which means all clubs from this season will be remaining in the league.

==== Table ====
Pos	Team	Pld	W	D	L	GF	GA	GD	Pts	Qualification or relegation
7	AZAL	32	12	8	12	44	44	0	44	
8	Ravan Baku	32	10	11	11	39	39	0	41	
9	Simurq	32	8	10	14	27	41	−14	34	
10	Kapaz	32	9	5	18	35	55	−20	32	
11	Turan (R)	32	6	7	19	26	42	−16	25	Qualification for relegation playoffs
12	Sumgayit (R)	32	6	6	20	27	52	−25	24	Relegation to Azerbaijan First Division

Source: Soccerway.com
Rules for classification: 1) points; 2) goal difference; 3) number of goals scored.
(R) Relegated

==== Results ====
Home \ Away	AZL	KAP	RAV	SIM	SUM	TUR
AZAL		2–0	1–1	0–0	1–1	1–0
Kapaz	0–2		1–0	0–1	4–1	2–1
Ravan Baku	2–0	5–1		0–0	3–2	2–2
Simurq	1–2	1–1	1–1		2–1	1–1
Sumgayit	1–0	2–0	0–1	1–2		1–1
Turan	3–0	2–0	2–1	0–0	1–1	

Source: Soccerway.com
Legend: Blue = home team win; Yellow = draw; Red = away team win.

== Season statistics ==
=== Top scorers ===
As of 11 May 2012

Rank	Player	Club	Goals
1	(Uzbekistan) Bahodir Nasimov	16	Neftchi
2	(Ukraine) Yuriy Fomenko	11	Kapaz
3	(Brazil) Tales Schutz	10	AZAL
3	(Brazil) Flavinho	10	Neftchi
3	(Morocco) Zouhir Benouahi	10	AZAL
4	(Brazil) Dodô	9	Gabala
5	(Lithuania) Robertas Poškus	8	Simurq
5	(Azerbaijan) Branimir Subašić	8	Khazar Lankaran
5	(France) Yannick Kamanan	8	Gabala

Last updated: 11 May 2012
Source: Azerbaijan Premier League

=== Hat-tricks ===
Player	For	Against	Result	Date
(Uzbekistan) Bahodir Nasimov	Neftchi Baku	AZAL	7–1	11 December 2011
(Lithuania) Deividas Česnauskis	FK Baku	Khazar Lankaran	4–1	14 April 2012

=== Scoring ===
- First goal of the season: John Pelu for Ravan Baku against Kəpəz (6 August 2011)
- Fastest goal of the season: 1st minute,
  - Shahin Karimov for Kəpəz against AZAL (11 September 2011)
  - Dejan Rusič for Khazar Lankaran against Kəpəz (16 December 2011)
- Latest goal of the season: 90+4 minutes,
  - Ramazan Abbasov for Ravan Baku against Simurq (19 August 2011)
  - Akif Taghiyev for Turan Tovuz against Simurq (25 August 2012)
- Largest winning margin: 6 goals
  - Neftchi Baku 7–1 AZAL(11 December 2012)
- Highest scoring game: 9 goals
  - AZAL 6–3 Sumgayit(7 March 2012)
- Most goals scored in a match by a single team: 7 goals
  - Neftchi Baku 7–1 AZAL(11 December 2012)
- Most goals scored in a match by a losing team: 3 goals
  - AZAL 6–3 Sumgayit(7 March 2012)

=== Clean sheets ===
- Most clean sheets: 17
  - Inter Baku
- Fewest clean sheets: 4
  - Kəpəz

=== Discipline ===
- Most yellow cards (club): 82
  - AZAL
- Most yellow cards (player): 12
  - Vidas Alunderis (Simurq)
- Most red cards (club): 7
  - Inter Baku
  - Ravan Baku
  - Kəpəz
- Most red cards (player): 3
  - Tagim Novruzov (Ravan Baku)

== Awards ==
=== Monthly awards ===
Month	Azerbaijan Professional Football League Awards	
Month	Player	Club
August	(Azerbaijan) Ceyhun Sultanov	Kəpəz
September	(Azerbaijan) Rashad Abdullayev	Neftchi
October	(Costa Rica) Winston Parks	Baku
November	(Brazil) Flavinho	Neftchi
December	(Georgia (country)) Bachana Tskhadadze	Inter Baku
February	(Azerbaijan) Afran Ismayilov	Qarabağ
March	(France) Yannick Kamanan	Gabala
April	(Lithuania) Deividas Česnauskis	Baku
May	(Brazil) Eder Bonfim	Khazar

=== Annual awards ===
Award	PFL Seasonal Awards	
Award	Player	Club
Best Goalkeeper	(Azerbaijan) Kamran Agayev	Khazar
Best Defender	(Azerbaijan) Ruslan Abishov	Khazar
Best Midfielder	(Romania) Adrian Piț	Khazar
Best Forward	(Azerbaijan) Rauf Aliyev	Qarabağ
Player of the Year	(Brazil) Flavinho	Neftchi
Young Player of the Year	(Azerbaijan) Nurlan Novruzov	Baku
Manager of the Year	(Azerbaijan) Boyukagha Hajiyev	Neftchi

== See also ==
- 2011–12 Azerbaijan First Division
- 2011–12 Azerbaijan Cup
- List of Azerbaijan football transfers summer 2011
- List of Azerbaijan football transfers winter 2012
