= Daniel Genov (footballer, born 1989) =

Bulgarian footballer

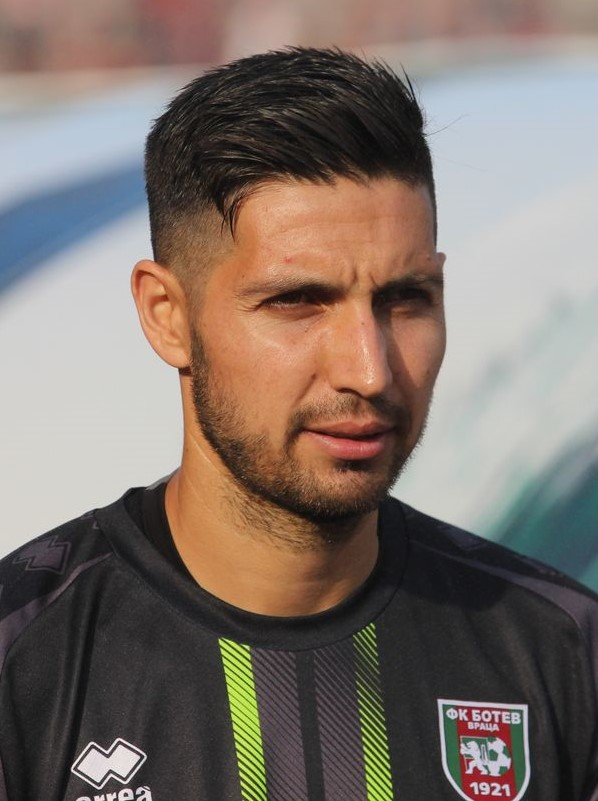

Personal information
- Full name: Daniel Nedyalkov Genov
- Date of birth: 19 May 1989 (age 37)
- Place of birth: Sofia, Bulgaria
- Height: 1.75 m (5 ft 9 in)
- Position: Winger

Team information
- Current team: Botev Vratsa
- Number: 9

Youth career
- CSKA Sofia
- Septemvri Sofia
- Slavia Sofia

Senior career*
Years	Team	Apps	(Gls)
2009–2010	Kom-Minyor	35	(14)
2010–2013	Inter Baku	28	(2)
2011–2012	→ Simurq (loan)	25	(1)
2014–2015	Lokomotiv Sofia	40	(8)
2015	Botev Plovdiv	19	(1)
2016	Pirin Blagoevgrad	13	(2)
2016–2017	Montana	26	(1)
2017–2018	Enosis Neon Paralimni	20	(1)
2018–2021	Botev Vratsa	79	(15)
2021–2022	Beroe	26	(1)
2022–	Botev Vratsa	139	(20)

International career
2009–2010	Bulgaria U21		
- * Club domestic league appearances and goals as of 11 June 2026

Daniel Nedyalkov Genov (Bulgarian: Даниел Недялков Генов; born 12 May 1989) is a Bulgarian professional footballer who currently plays as a winger for Botev Vratsa.

== Career ==
Genov played youth football with CSKA Sofia, Septemvri Sofia and Slavia Sofia.

In January 2009, Genov joined Kom-Minyor. He made his debut on 14 March in a match against Rilski Sportist as a 48th-minute substitute.

=== Inter Baku ===
In July 2010, Genov signed a two-and-a-half-year contract with Azerbaijani side Inter Baku. He made his debut in a 2–0 home loss against Neftchi on 28 August. In his first season, Genov earned only 7 appearances in the Azerbaijan Premier League.

In June 2011, Simurq signed Genov on a season-long loan deal. On 25 March 2012, he opened the scoring in a 2–1 away win over Sumgayit.

Genov was released by Inter in December 2013.

=== Lokomotiv Sofia ===
On 31 January 2014, Genov signed one-and-a-half-year contract with Lokomotiv Sofia. On 22 February, he made his debut, replacing Petar Dimitrov for the last 35 minutes of a 5–0 home win over Neftochimic Burgas. Genov scored his first Lokomotiv goal on 13 April in a 2–0 away win to Lyubimets 2007.

On 7 January 2015, Genov signed a one-year contract extension, keeping him at Lokomotiv until 30 June 2016.

Lokomotiv Sofia finished season 2014–15 on 3rd place but was related to amateur football league due to financial difficulties. The contract of Daniel Genov, who scored 8 goals in 31 games in A Grupa that season, as well as the contracts of all other players were terminated.

=== Botev Plovdiv ===
On 29 June Daniel Genov and Valentin Galev, his ex-teammate from Lokomotiv Sofia, joined Botev Plovdiv on free transfer.

On 18 July Genov made an exciting official debut for Botev Plovdiv in the match against Levski Sofia when he came on as a substitute and scored the equalizer in a 1–1 draw.

On 23 September Daniel Genov scored during the 0–4 away win over FC Septemvri Simitli in a game for the Bulgarian Cup.

At the end of 2015 Nikolay Kostov, the new manager of Botev Plovdiv, decided to release Daniel Genov on a free transfer. On 14 January 2016 the contract of Genov was terminated on a mutual agreement. Genov played in 22 games for Botev Plovdiv and scored 2 goals.

=== Pirin Blagoevgrad ===
On 14 January 2016 Daniel terminated his contract with Botev Plovdiv by mutual agreement and signed with Pirin Blagoevgrad.

=== Botev Vratsa ===
In June 2022 Genov joined Botev Vratsa for a second spell with the club.

== Career statistics ==
As of 29 May 2016

Club statistics
Season	Club	League	League		Cup		Continental		Total	
Season	Club	League	App	Goals	App	Goals	App	Goals	App	Goals
2008–09	Kom-Minyor	B Group	9	3	0	0	–		9	3
2009–10	Kom-Minyor	B Group	26	11	0	0	–		26	11
2010–11	Inter Baku	Premier League	7	0	1	0	–		8	0
2011–12	Simurq (loan)	Premier League	25	1	1	0	–		26	1
2012–13	Inter Baku	Premier League	19	2	1	0	4	0	24	2
2013–14	Inter Baku	Premier League	2	0	0	0	4	0	6	0
2013–14	Lokomotiv Sofia	A Group	14	3	4	1	–		18	4
2014–15	Lokomotiv Sofia	A Group	26	5	5	3	–		31	8
2015–16	Botev Plovdiv	A Group	19	1	2	1	–		21	2
2015–16	Pirin Blagoevgrad	A Group	13	2	0	0	–		13	2
Career Total			160	28	14	5	8	0	182	33
