= Yevhen Shmakov =

Ukrainian footballer (born 1985)

Personal information
- Full name: Yevhen Viktorovych Shmakov
- Date of birth: 7 June 1985 (age 41)
- Place of birth: Khmelnytskyi, Ukrainian SSR
- Height: 1.85 m (6 ft 1 in)
- Position: Midfielder

Youth career
- 2000–2002: UFK-Karpaty Lviv

Senior career*
Years	Team	Apps	(Gls)
2002–2007	Karpaty Lviv	78	(5)
2002–2004	→ Halychyna-Karpaty Lviv	32	(4)
2003–2004	→ Karpaty-2 Lviv	29	(1)
2007–2008	Dynamo Kyiv	0	(0)
2007–2008	→ Zorya Luhansk (loan)	15	(1)
2008	→ Arsenal Kyiv (loan)	4	(0)
2008–2009	Tavriya Simferopol	5	(0)
2009	Illichevets Mariupol	3	(0)
2010	Luch-Energiya Vladivostok	7	(0)
2011	Gomel	14	(0)
2011	Simurq	18	(3)
2012	Kaisar	12	(0)
- * Club domestic league appearances and goals as of 31 December 2012

Yevhen Viktorovych Shmakov (Ukrainian: Євген Шмаков; born 7 June 1985) is a Ukrainian former professional footballer who played as a midfielder.

== Career ==
Shmakov played for Arsenal Kyiv in the Ukrainian Premier League on loan from Dynamo Kyiv. On 22 August 2008, Arsenal Kyiv broke their contract with Shmakov, and was granted a free-agent status by Dynamo Kyiv, which he used to sign for Tavriya Simferopol where he played for one season before moving to Illichevets Mariupol.
