= Kristaps Grebis =

Latvian footballer (born 1980)

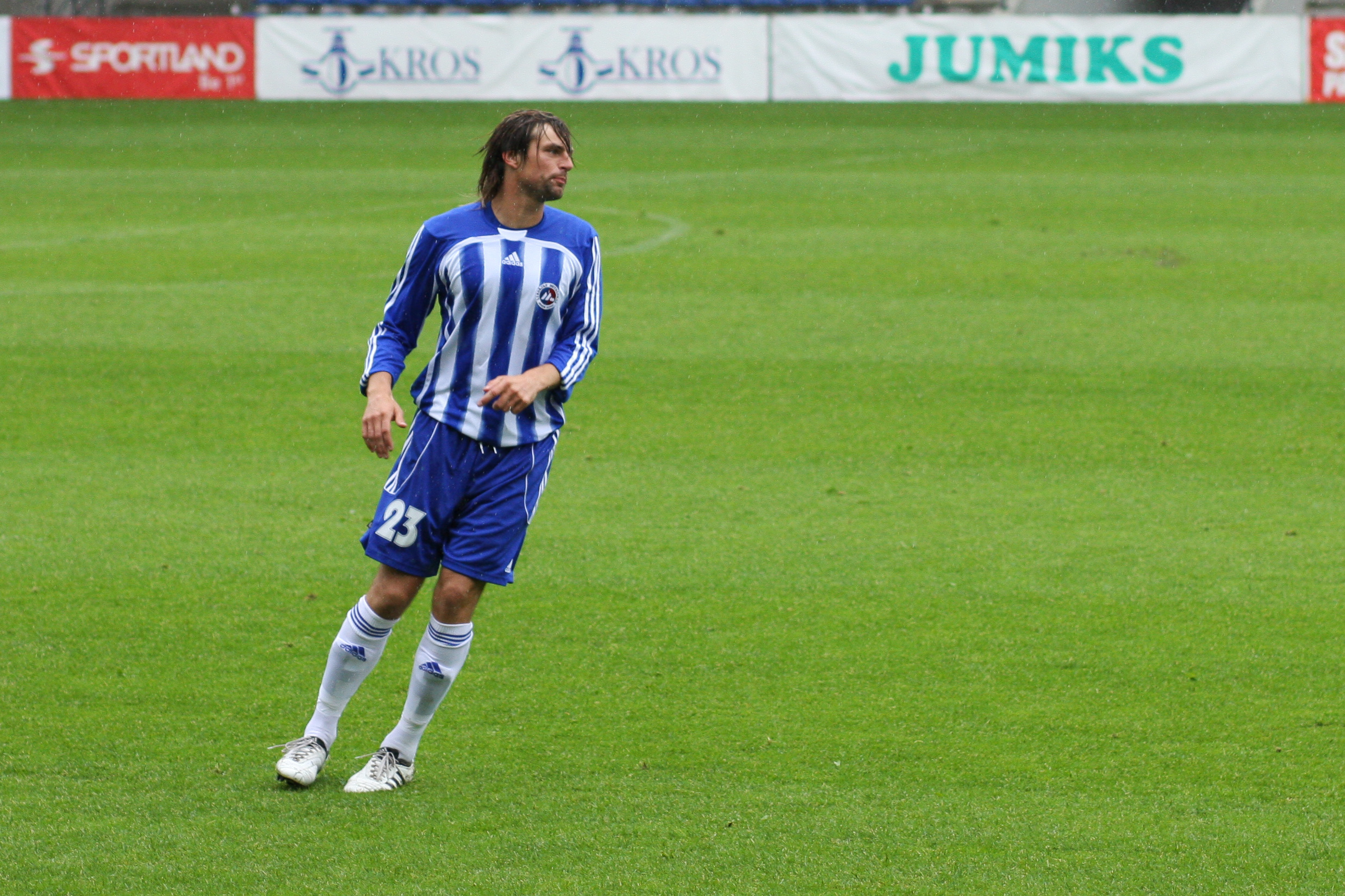
- Grebis playing for Liepājas Metalurgs

Personal information
- Date of birth: 13 December 1980 (age 45)
- Place of birth: Liepāja, Latvian SSR, Soviet Union (now Republic of Latvia)
- Height: 1.88 m (6 ft 2 in)
- Position: Forward

Senior career*
Years	Team	Apps	(Gls)
2000	Liepājas Metalurgs	7	(1)
2001	FK Rīga	20	(3)
2002–2006	Liepājas Metalurgs	112	(45)
2006–2007	Oxford United	4	(0)
2007	FK Ventspils	11	(0)
2008–2010	Liepājas Metalurgs	75	(55)
2011	FK Gence	5	(0)
2011–2012	Simurq Zaqatala	13	(1)
2012–2013	Viktoria 1889	5	(0)
2013	Daugava Rīga	9	(1)
2013	FC Jūrmala	14	(0)
2014–2018	FK Liepāja	93	(28)
Total		368	(124)

International career
2008–2011	Latvia	13	(2)
- * Club domestic league appearances and goals

Kristaps Grebis (born 13 December 1980) is a Latvian former professional footballer who played as a forward.

== Club career ==
Born in Liepāja, Grebis started his professional career in 2000 with Liepājas Metalurgs. Making seven appearances and scoring one goal in his first season, he later had a short spell with FK Rīga, returning to Liepāja in 2002. This time playing there for four consecutive seasons, in 2006 he left for Oxford United. Grebis had his contract with Oxford United cancelled by mutual consent in March 2007, as this period of his career was not the best. Later on he joined FK Ventspils, but in 2008 came back to his home land team Liepājas Metalurgs. He played there for two years, until 2008, making 63 appearances and scoring 48 goals. In 2009, he was the best scorer of the Virsliga championship with 30 goals in one season. This was definitely the best period in his career, while playing in Latvia. In February 2011 he joined AEL Limassol, after being on trial with them for two weeks. His stay in Cyprus was short. After four days on the squad, the club may have used a ruse of undiagnosed heart problems found during the medical tests. Grebis maintained he had none. It was speculated a reason for his release needed to be found. A week later he signed a contract with FK Gence, playing in the Azerbaijan Premier League. In July 2011 Grebis moved to Simurq Zaqatala. In August 2012 he was signed by the German NOFV-Oberliga Nord club Viktoria 1889. He left the club in February 2013, having played five league matches, and returned to the Latvian Higher League, signing with Daugava Rīga. Grebis played nine matches for Daugava, marking one goal to his name, before joining FC Jūrmala in July 2013. Prior to the 2014 season Grebis returned to his home-town Liepāja and signed a contract with the newly established club FK Liepāja, led by his former international teammate Māris Verpakovskis. He scored on his debut for the club.

Grebis retired after the 2018 season.

== International career ==
Grebis made his debut for Latvia in 2008. He has collected 13 appearances and scored 2 international goals.

== Honours ==
- Latvian Higher League: 2005, 2007, 2009
- Latvian Football Cup: 2006, 2007
- Baltic League: 2007
