= Rudison =

Brazilian footballer

Personal information
- Full name: Rudison Nogueira Ferreira
- Date of birth: 15 February 1983 (age 43)
- Place of birth: Mariana, Minas Gerais, Brazil
- Height: 1.78 m (5 ft 10 in)
- Position: Midfielder

Youth career
- 1992–1999: São Paulo

Senior career*
| Years | Team | Apps | (Gls) |
| 1999–2001 | São Paulo | | |
| 2001–2002 | Borac Čačak | | |
| 2002–2003 | OFK Beograd | | |
| 2003–2004 | Mulhouse | 15 | (0) |
| 2004–2005 | Angers | 2 | (0) |
| 2005 | Le Havre | 1 | (0) |
| 2006 | Romorantin | 17 | (0) |
| 2006 | Le Havre | 0 | (0) |
| 2007 | Difaa El Jadida | | |
| 2007–2008 | Zulte-Waregem | 4 | (0) |
| 2008–2009 | Ostende | 30 | (4) |
| 2009 | Ceahlăul Piatra Neamț | 7 | (0) |
| 2010 | JS Saint-Pierroise | | |
| 2011 | FC Dieppe | 17 | (2) |
| 2011 | Turan Tovuz | 11 | (0) |

International career
- Brazil U-17
- * Club domestic league appearances and goals

Rudison Nogueira Ferreira (born 15 February 1983), or simply Rudison, is a Brazilian former football midfielder.

== Career ==
Born in Mariana, Minas Gerais, Brazil, his career started in 1994 in Brazilian giant São Paulo, where he made his formation alongside players like Kaká and Grafite. He stayed there six seasons. In 2000, he decided to move to Europe to play in Serbia in the back then First League of FR Yugoslavia; first one season in Borac Čačak, then another in OFK Beograd. In 2003, he moved to France where he played in several clubs, including two seasons with Ligue 2 club SCO Angers, and one and a half in Le Havre AC. In 2007, he had a short spell in Morocco playing with Difaa El Jadida playing in the Moroccan Championship. In summer 2007, he moved to Belgium where he first played in Jupiler League club Zulte-Waregem, and, since 2008, in K.V. Oostende in Belgian Second Division. In the 2009–10 season he played with Romanian Liga I side Ceahlăul Piatra Neamț. During 2010 he had a spell with JS Saint-Pierroise in the Réunion Premier League and with FC Dieppe back in France. In the summer of 2011 Rudison moved to Turan Tovuz in the Azerbaijan Premier League before leaving them in the winter transfer window of the same season after eleven games.
