= İqor Getman =

Azerbaijani footballer and coach (born 1971)

Personal information
- Full name: İqor Yevgenyeviç Getman
- Date of birth: 7 June 1971 (age 55)
- Place of birth: Baku, Azerbaijani SSR
- Height: 1.82 m (5 ft 11 1/2 in)
- Position: Defender

Team information
- Current team: Neftchi Baku

Senior career*
Years	Team	Apps	(Gls)
1991	Neftchi Baku	26	(0)
1992	Dynamo Stavropol	0	(0)
1993–1997	Anzhi Makhachkala	168	(14)
1997–2007	Neftchi Baku	154	(5)

International career
1995–2001	Azerbaijan	24	(0)

Managerial career
- 2007–2011: Neftchi Baku (youth team manager)
- 2011–12: Simurq PFC (assistant)
- 2012: Simurq PFC (caretaker)
- 2016–: Neftchi Baku (assistant)
- * Club domestic league appearances and goals

İqor Yevgenyeviç Getman (Russian: Игорь Евгеньевич Гетман; born 7 June 1971) is an Azerbaijani professional football coach and a former player.

== Honours ==
- Azerbaijan Premier League winner: 1992, 2004, 2005.
- Azerbaijan Cup winner: 1999, 2004.
