= Shamil Saidov =

Russian footballer

Personal information
- Full name: Shamil Magomedbashirovich Saidov
- Date of birth: 21 March 1982 (age 44)
- Place of birth: Makhachkala, Dagestan, Russian SFSR
- Height: 1.94 m (6 ft 4 1/2 in)
- Position: Goalkeeper

Senior career*
Years	Team	Apps	(Gls)
2001–2002	Lokomotiv St. Petersburg (amateur)		
2003–2004	Anzhi Makhachkala	1	(0)
2005	Arsenal Tula	16	(0)
2005	Lokomotiv-NN	4	(0)
2006	Anzhi Makhachkala	4	(0)
2008	Arsenal Tula (amateur)		
2008–2009	Dagdizel Kaspiysk	45	(0)
2009–2011	Turan Tovuz	20	(0)
- * Club domestic league appearances and goals

Shamil Magomedbashirovich Saidov (Russian: Шамиль Магомедбаширович Саидов; born 21 March 1982) is a former Russian professional football player.

== Club career ==
He made his Russian Football National League debut for FC Anzhi Makhachkala on 26 May 2004 in a game against FC Dynamo Bryansk. He played one more season in the FNL for Anzhi.
