= Robertas Poškus =

Lithuanian footballer and manager

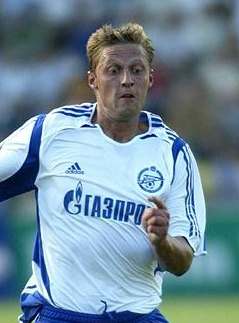

Personal information
- Date of birth: 5 May 1979 (age 47)
- Place of birth: Klaipėda, Lithuanian SSR, Soviet Union
- Height: 1.83 m (6 ft 0 in)
- Position: Striker

Senior career*
Years	Team	Apps	(Gls)
1996–1997	Atlantas	10	(4)
1997–1998	Hamburger SV	0	(0)
1998–1999	Kareda Siauliai	9	(5)
1999–2000	Žalgiris	8	(5)
1999–2000	→ Widzew Łódź (loan)	27	(12)
2000–2001	Polonia Warsaw	8	(0)
2002–2005	Krylia Sovetov	79	(24)
2005–2006	Zenit St.Petersburg	22	(3)
2006–2007	Dynamo Moscow	5	(0)
2007	Rostov	5	(0)
2008	Bnei Sakhnin	6	(1)
2009	Ural	12	(2)
2009–2011	Inter Baku	51	(17)
2011–2012	Simurq	16	(8)
2012	Sibir Novosibirsk	15	(3)
2013–2014	Klaipėdos Granitas	31	(9)
Total		304	(93)

International career
1999–2011	Lithuania	48	(8)

Managerial career
- 2013–2014: Klaipėdos Granitas
- 2016: Lietava Jonava
- 2017–2018: Amkar Perm (youth team)
- 2018–2019: Zagłębie Sosnowiec (assistant)
- * Club domestic league appearances and goals

Robertas Poškus (born 5 May 1979) is a Lithuanian professional football manager and former player.

== Career ==
=== Club ===
In 15 years he left for Germany, played there for several years for the team of Hamburger SV. From 2002 to 2005 he appeared in the FC Krylia Sovetov Samara "Wings of the Soviets". 30 June 2003, played for the team of foreign players of the Russian championship. In the summer of 2005 he moved to FC Zenit Saint Petersburg. In February 2009, he moved to FC Ural Sverdlovsk Oblast [2], serving in the First Division of Russia [2], which included 12 matches and scored 2 goals, after which, on 21 August, he was discarded [3]. In the 2009/10 season he became the champion of Azerbaijan in the Inter Baku. In the 2012/13 season, played for FC Sibir Novosibirsk. Since 2013 – the head coach of the club "Klaipedos Granitas", performing in the First League of Lithuania.

=== Managerial ===
In June 2017, Poškus became the head coach of the Amkar Perm youth team.

== Career statistics ==
=== Club ===
Club	Season	League			National Cup		League Cup		Continental		Other		Total	
Club	Season	Division	Apps	Goals	Apps	Goals	Apps	Goals	Apps	Goals	Apps	Goals	Apps	Goals
Widzew Łódź (loan)	1999–2000	Ekstraklasa	12	5	3	1	0	0	0	0	-		15	6
Widzew Łódź (loan)	2000–01	Ekstraklasa	15	7	1	0	1	0	-		-		17	7
Widzew Łódź (loan)	Total		27	12	4	1	1	0	0	0	-	-	32	13
Polonia Warsaw	2000–01	Ekstraklasa	8	0	3	2	0	0	0	0	–		11	2
Krylia Sovetov	2002	Russian Premier League	30	11			-		-		-		30	11
Krylia Sovetov	2003	Russian Premier League	19	3			-		-		-		19	3
Krylia Sovetov	2004	Russian Premier League	18	9			-		-		-		18	9
Krylia Sovetov	2005	Russian Premier League	12	1			-		-		-		12	1
Krylia Sovetov	Total		79	24			-	-	-	-	-	-	79	24
Zenit St.Petersburg	2005	Russian Premier League	11	1	1	1	-		4	0	-		16	2
Zenit St.Petersburg	2006	Russian Premier League	11	2	4	0	-		2	0	-		17	2
Zenit St.Petersburg	Total		22	3	5	1	-	-	6	0	-	-	33	4
Dynamo Moscow	2006	Russian Premier League	5	0			–		–		–		5	0
Rostov	2007	Russian Premier League	5	0			–		–		–		5	0
Bnei Sakhnin	2008–09	Israeli Premier League	6	1					0	0	–		6	1
Ural	2009	Russian First Division	12	2			–		–		–		12	2
Inter Baku	2009–10	Azerbaijan Premier League	25	12			-		0	0	-		25	12
Inter Baku	2010–11	Azerbaijan Premier League	26	5	5	1	-		2	0	-		33	6
Inter Baku	Total		51	17	5	1	-	-	2	0	-	-	58	18
Simurq	2011–12	Azerbaijan Premier League	16	8	0	0	–		–		–		16	8
Sibir Novosibirsk	2012–13	Russian National League	15	3	0	0	–		–		–		15	3
Klaipėdos Granitas	2013	I Lyga	16	4			–		–		–		16	4
Klaipėdos Granitas	2014	A Lyga	15	5			–		–		–		15	5
Klaipėdos Granitas	Total		31	9			-	-	-	-	-	-	31	9
Career total			277	79	17	5	1	0	8	0	-	-	320	84

=== International ===
Lithuania national team
Year	Apps	Goals
1999	1	0
2000	2	0
2001	8	1
2002	5	2
2003	3	0
2004	4	1
2005	5	0
2006	5	1
2007	2	0
2008	5	2
2009	1	0
2010	6	0
2011	1	0
Total	48	7

Statistics accurate as of match played 11 October 2011

=== International goals ===
#	Date	Venue	Opponent	Score	Result	Competition
1.	2001 February 26	Limassol	Cyprus	2–1	2–1	Friendly
2.	2001 August 15	Kaunas	Israel	2–1	2–3	Friendly
3.	2002 August 21	Kaunas	Israel	2–1	2–4	Friendly
4.	2002 October 12	Kaunas	Faroe Islands	2–0	2–0	UEFA Euro 2004 qualifying
5.	2004 August 18	Moscow	Russia	2–3	3–4	Friendly
6.	2006 August 16	Chișinău	Moldova	1–0	2–3	Friendly
7.	2008 August 20	Marijampolė	Moldova	1–0	3–0	Friendly
8.	2008 August 20	Marijampolė	Moldova	2–0	3–0	Friendly

== Honours ==
Kareda Siauliai

- Lithuanian Football Cup: 1999

Polonia Warsaw

- Polish Cup: 2000–01

Inter Baku

- Azerbaijan Premier League: 2009–10

Individual

- Lithuanian Footballer of the Year: 2003
