= Vidas Alunderis =

Lithuanian footballer

Personal information
- Date of birth: 27 March 1979 (age 47)
- Place of birth: Klaipėda, Soviet Union
- Height: 1.85 m (6 ft 1 in)
- Position: Defender

Senior career*
Years	Team	Apps	(Gls)
1996–1997	Zalgiris-Volmeta Vilnius	11	(0)
1997	Atlantas	5	(0)
1998	Gelezinis Vilkas	11	(0)
1999	Ardena	15	(1)
2000–2001	Žalgiris	37	(1)
2001–2003	Metalist Kharkiv	33	(0)
2001–2002	Metalist-2 Kharkiv	2	(0)
2003	Vėtra	8	(0)
2004	Atlantas	21	(3)
2005–2008	Zagłębie Lubin	51	(3)
2008–2009	Tavriya Simferopol	8	(0)
2009–2010	LASK	25	(1)
2010–2011	Baltika Kaliningrad	16	(1)
2011–2012	Simurq	26	(1)
2012	Sibir Novosibirsk	15	(0)
2013	Klaipėdos Granitas	12	(5)

International career
2003–2010	Lithuania	21	(0)
- * Club domestic league appearances and goals

Vidas Alunderis (born 27 March 1979) is a Lithuanian former professional footballer who played as a defender.

== Honours ==
Zagłębie Lubin

- Ekstraklasa: 2006–07
