= Serhiy Artiukh =

Ukrainian football player

Personal information
- Date of birth: 29 July 1985 (age 41)
- Place of birth: Donetsk, Ukrainian SSR, Soviet Union
- Height: 1.75 m (5 ft 9 in)
- Position: Forward

Senior career*
Years	Team	Apps	(Gls)
2003	Metalurh-2 Donetsk	2	(0)
2004–2006	FC Olimpik Donetsk	45	(19)
2006–2007	FC Vorskla Poltava	21	(0)
2007–2008	FC Stal Alchevsk	26	(7)
2008–2009	FK Simurq Zaqatala	34	(7)
2010	FC Poltava	10	(2)
2010	Zakarpattia	12	(1)
2011	Olimpik Donetsk	7	(3)
2011	Turan Tovuz	13	(5)
2012	Ravan Baku	8	(0)
2012–2013	Naftovyk-Ukrnafta Okhtyrka	45	(8)
- * Club domestic league appearances and goals as of 12 November 2013 ‡ National team caps and goals as of 1 August 2008

Serhiy Artiukh (Ukrainian: Сергій Артюх, born 29 July 1985 in Donetsk) is a Ukrainian football player who plays as a forward.

He previously played for Ravan Baku.
