= 2012–13 PFC Turan Tovuz season =

Turan Tovuz
2012–13 season
- President: Tofig Zeynalov
- Manager: Asgar Abdullayev until 12 October 2012; Afghan Talybov from 12 October 2012
- Stadium: Tovuz City Stadium
- Premier League: 11th
- Azerbaijan Cup: Second Round vs Khazar Lankaran
- Top goalscorer: League: Salif Ballo (12); All: Salif Ballo (12)
- Highest home attendance: 6,000 vs Sumgayit; 11 August 2012
- Lowest home attendance: 150 vs Baku; 13 February 2013
- Average home league attendance: 2,176
Home colours	Away colours

The Turan Tovuz 2011–12 season was Turan Tovuz's twentieth Azerbaijan Premier League season. Turan Tovuz started the season under the management of Asgar Abdullayev, but he resigned and was replaced by Afghan Talybov on 12 October 2012. Turan Tovuz ended the season in 11th-place resulting in relegation to the Azerbaijan First Division for the 2013–14 season. They also participated in the 2012–13 Azerbaijan Cup getting knocked out in the second round on penalties to Khazar Lankaran after the game ended 1-1.

== Squad ==
As of 2 February 2013

Note: Flags indicate national team as defined under FIFA eligibility rules; some limited exceptions apply. Players may hold more than one non-FIFA nationality.

No.	Pos.	Nation	Player
1	GK	AZE	Kamal Bayramov
2	DF	UKR	Dmitriy Pospelov
3	DF	KAZ	Anatoli Stukalov
4	DF	AZE	Vugar Baybalayev (on loan from Baku)
5	DF	AZE	Vasif Rzayev (on loan from Baku)
6	MF	AZE	Mikayil Rahimov
7	MF	AZE	Azer Mammadov
8	MF	AZE	Budag Nasirov
9	MF	AZE	Murad Aghakishiyev
10	MF	AZE	Hafiz Aliyev (captain)
13	DF	LTU	Marius Kazlauskas
14	MF	FRA	Ender Günlü
14	FW	UKR	Yaroslav Sukhanov
15	FW	AZE	Rashad Piriyev

No.	Pos.	Nation	Player
16	MF	AZE	Elmikhan Mammadov
17	DF	AZE	Farmayil Aliyev
18	MF	AZE	Seymur Taghiyev
19	MF	AZE	Asef Gadiri
20	MF	GEO	David Japaridze
21	MF	CRO	Anton Rukavina
21	DF	AZE	Elshad Manafov (on loan from Baku)
22	MF	MLI	Salif Ballo
23	MF	AZE	Räşad Hacızadä
--	GK	AZE	Mikayil Yusifov
--	MF	AZE	Sergey Chernyshev
--	FW	AZE	Ulvi Guliyev (on loan from Baku)

== Transfers ==
=== Summer ===
In: Note: Flags indicate national team as defined under FIFA eligibility rules; some limited exceptions apply. Players may hold more than one non-FIFA nationality.

No.	Pos.	Nation	Player
1	GK	CRO	Ivan Grabovac (from (Croatia) NK Karlovac)
3	DF	CRO	Ante Zurak (from (Bosnia and Herzegovina) GOŠK Gabela)
4	MF	GEO	Levan Chkhetiani (from (Georgia (country)) Sioni Bolnisi)
6	DF	AZE	Mikayil Rahimov (from (Azerbaijan) Simurq)
9	MF	AZE	Murad Aghakishiyev
12	FW	GEO	Gogi Pipia (from (Georgia (country)) Zestafoni)
13	DF	LTU	Marius Kazlauskas (from (Lithuania) REO Vilnius)
14	MF	FRA	Ender Günlü (from (Turkey) Turgutluspor)
17	DF	AZE	Huseyn Isgandarov (from (Azerbaijan) Ravan Baku)
21	MF	CRO	Anton Rukavina (from (Croatia) Karlovac)
22	MF	MLI	Salif Ballo (from (Azerbaijan) Khazar Lankaran)
23	MF	GEO	Irakli Beraia (from (Azerbaijan) Kəpəz)
24	DF	UKR	Ruslan Zubkov (loan from (Azerbaijan) AZAL)
25	MF	RUS	Nugzar Kvirtiya (from (Azerbaijan) AZAL)
26	DF	UKR	Aleksandr Krutskevich (from (China) Harbin Yiteng)

Out: Note: Flags indicate national team as defined under FIFA eligibility rules; some limited exceptions apply. Players may hold more than one non-FIFA nationality.

No.	Pos.	Nation	Player
—	GK	AZE	Anar Nazirov (loan return to (Azerbaijan) Gabala)
—	DF	TUR	Muammer Erdoğdu (to (Azerbaijan) Gabala)
—	DF	AZE	Elhad Ahmadov
—	DF	GHA	Seidu Salifu (to (Ghana) All Stars)
—	MF	MDA	Daniel Pisla (to (Moldova) FC Costuleni)
—	MF	AZE	Javid Taghiyev (to (Azerbaijan) AZAL)
11	MF	GEO	Giorgi Beriashvili (to (Georgia (country)) Torpedo Kutaisi)
14	MF	GEO	Aleksandr Gogoberishvili (to (Georgia (country)) Guria Lanchkhuti)
16	DF	AZE	Rashad Orujov
20	FW	AZE	Ilkin Sadygov
23	MF	AZE	Rashad Hajizade
27	GK	AZE	Kamil Sahratov

=== Winter ===
In: Note: Flags indicate national team as defined under FIFA eligibility rules; some limited exceptions apply. Players may hold more than one non-FIFA nationality.

No.	Pos.	Nation	Player
1	GK	AZE	Kamal Bayramov (from (Azerbaijan) Khazar Lankaran)
2	DF	UKR	Dmitriy Pospelov (from (Ukraine) Odesa)
3	DF	KAZ	Anatoli Stukalov (from (Kazakhstan) Tobol)
5	DF	AZE	Vasif Rzayev (loan from (Azerbaijan) Baku)
13	MF	GEO	Nika Maisuradze (from (Georgia (country)) Chikhura Sachkhere)
14	DF	UKR	Yaroslav Sukhanov
20	FW	GEO	David Janelidze (from (Georgia (country)) Metalurgi Rustavi)
—	GK	AZE	Mikayil Yusifov
—	DF	AZE	Elshad Manafov (loan from (Azerbaijan) Baku)
—	DF	AZE	Vugar Baybalayev (loan from (Azerbaijan) Baku)
—	MF	AZE	Sergey Chernyshev
—	FW	AZE	Ulvi Guliyev (loan from (Azerbaijan) Baku)

Out: Note: Flags indicate national team as defined under FIFA eligibility rules; some limited exceptions apply. Players may hold more than one non-FIFA nationality.

No.	Pos.	Nation	Player
1	GK	CRO	=Ivan Grabovac (to (Croatia) HNK Orijent 1919)
3	DF	CRO	Ante Zurak (to (Croatia) HNK Primorac Biograd na Moru)
4	DF	GEO	Levan Chkhetiani (to (Georgia (country)) Sioni Bolnisi)
5	FW	AZE	Farid Guliyev (to (Azerbaijan) Kəpəz)
11	MF	GEO	Gogi Pipia (to (Georgia (country)) Metalurgi Rustavi)
24	DF	UKR	Ruslan Zubkov (loan return to (Azerbaijan) AZAL)
25	MF	RUS	Nugzar Kvirtiya (Released)
26	DF	UKR	Aleksandr Krutskevich (Released)
27	GK	AZE	Natiq Sahratov (Released)

== Competitions ==
=== Azerbaijan Premier League ===
==== Results summary ====
Overall								Home						Away					
Pld	W	D	L	GF	GA	GD	Pts	W	D	L	GF	GA	GD	W	D	L	GF	GA	GD
22	6	5	11	23	34	−11	23	3	2	6	14	18	−4	3	3	5	9	16	−7

Last updated: 4 March 2013.
Source: Soccerway

==== Results by round ====
Round	1	2	3	4	5	6	7	8	9	10	11	12	13	14	15	16	17	18	19	20	21	22
Ground	A	H	A	H	A	H	H	A	H	A	H	H	A	A	H	A	H	A	H	A	A	H
Result	W	L	L	L	D	L	W	L	W	W	D	D	L	D	W	D	L	L	L	L	W	L
Position	1	6	8	11	9	11	7	10		5	6	8	9	8	8	8	9	10	10	11	9	9

Source: Soccerway
A = Away; H = Home; W = Win; D = Draw; L = Loss

==== Results ====
4 August 2012 1	Kəpəz	1–2	Turan	Ganja
18:30 AZST (UTC+5)	I.Beraia 10'	Summary	Pipia 36'; Mammadov 69'	Stadium: Ganja City Stadium; Attendance: 8,000; Referee: Aliyar Agayev

11 August 2012 2	Turan	0–1	Sumgayit	Tovuz
18:00 AZST (UTC+5)		Summary	Pamuk (red card) 28'; Gurbanov 58' (pen.)	Stadium: Tovuz City Stadium; Attendance: 6,000; Referee: Elvin Askerov

18 August 2012 3	Simurq	3–0	Turan	Zaqatala
19:00 AZST (UTC+5)	Popović 75', 82'; Božić 90+2'	Summary		Stadium: Zaqatala City Stadium; Attendance: 3,000; Referee: Orkhan Mammadov

25 August 2012 4	Turan	2–3	Inter	Tovuz
18:00 AZST (UTC+5)	Ballo 73'; Mammadov 84'	Summary	Adamia 58'; Levin 88'; Georgievski 90+3'	Stadium: Tovuz City Stadium; Attendance: 2,000; Referee: Rahim Hasanov

14 September 2012 5	Baku	1–1	Turan	Baku
20:00 AZST (UTC+5)	Kargbo 39'	Summary	Günlü 48'	Stadium: Tofig Bakhramov Stadium; Attendance: 480; Referee: Vusal Aliyev

23 September 2012 6	Turan	0–1	Qarabağ	Tovuz
17:00 AZST (UTC+5)		Summary	Sadygov 85' (pen.)	Stadium: Tovuz City Stadium; Attendance: 2,000; Referee: Elchin Mämmädov

29 September 2012 7	Turan	2–1	Khazar	Tovuz
16:00 AZST (UTC+5)	Ballo 55', 58'	Summary	Abishov (red card) 23'; Sadio 45'; Allahverdiyev (yellow card) 77' (red card) 78'	Stadium: Tovuz City Stadium; Attendance: 2,400; Referee: Rahim Hasanov

8 October 2012 8	Neftchi	2–1	Turan	Baku
16:00 AZST (UTC+5)	Sadigov 11' (pen.); Ramos 37'	Summary	Pipia 90+2'	Stadium: Ismat Gayibov Stadium; Attendance: 250; Referee: Anar Salmanov

20 October 2012 9	Turan	1–0	AZAL	Tovuz
16:00 AZST (UTC+5)	Günlü 13'	Summary		Stadium: Tovuz City Stadium; Attendance: 3,000; Referee: Rahim Hasanov

26 October 2012 10	Gabala	0–1	Turan	Qabala
16:00 AZST (UTC+5)		Summary	Rukavina 57'	Stadium: Gabala City Stadium; Attendance: 500; Referee: Anar Salmanov

31 October 2012 11	Turan	2–2	Ravan Baku	Tovuz
16:00 AZT (UTC+4)	Aghakishiyev 24'; Krutskevich 90+4'	Summary	Vidaković 77', 81'	Stadium: Tovuz City Stadium; Attendance: 4,000; Referee: Elvin Äsgärov

4 November 2012 12	Turan	1–1	Simurq	Tovuz
14:00 AZT (UTC+4)	Guliyev 79'	Summary	Poljak 35'; Ramaldanov (red card) 63'; G.Ibrahimov (red card) 80'; Qirtimov (yellow card) 39' (red card) 87'	Stadium: Tovuz City Stadium; Attendance: 3,000; Referee: Anar Salmanov

18 November 2012 13	Inter	2–0	Turan	Baku
18:00 AZT (UTC+4)	S.Zargarov 11'; Tskhadadze 55'	Summary		Stadium: Tofig Bakhramov Stadium; Attendance: 200; Referee: Aliyar Ağayev

24 November 2012 14	Qarabağ	1–1	Turan	Quzanlı
14:00 AZT (UTC+4)	M.Rahimov 85' (o.g.)	Summary	Ballo 69'	Stadium: Guzanli Olympic Complex Stadium; Attendance: 300; Referee: Rahim Hasanov

2 December 2012 15	Turan	5–1	Kəpəz	Tovuz
14:00 AZT (UTC+4)	Ballo 2', 19', 58'; Guliyev 44'; Günlü 72'	Summary	Krutskevich 52' (o.g.)	Stadium: Tovuz City Stadium; Attendance: 4,500; Referee: Elchin Mämmädov

10 December 2012 16	Turan	Postponed^{1}	Baku	Tovuz
14:00 AZT (UTC+4)		Summary		Stadium: Tovuz City Stadium

15 December 2012 17	AZAL	0–0	Turan	Baku
15:00 AZT (UTC+4)		Summary		Stadium: AZAL Stadium; Attendance: 200; Referee: Rahim Häsänov

20 December 2012 18	Turan	0–2	Gabala	Tovuz
14:00 AZT (UTC+4)		Summary	Abdullayev 76' (pen.); Dodô 88'	Stadium: Tovuz City Stadium; Attendance: 1,500; Referee: Fariz Yusifov

9 February 2013 19	Ravan Baku	2–0	Turan	Baku
17:00 AZT (UTC+4)	Adamović 36'; Kalonas 71'	Summary		Stadium: Dalga Arena; Attendance: 250

13 February 2013 16	Turan	0–4	Baku	Tovuz
15:00 AZT (UTC+4)		Summary	Pena 43'; Mammadov 62'; Šolić 68'; Novruzov 85'	Stadium: Tovuz City Stadium; Attendance: 150; Referee: Elvin Äsgärov

17 February 2013 20	Khazar	4–2	Turan	Lankaran
16:00 AZT (UTC+4)	Scarlatache 4', 40'; Güleç 45+2'; Sadio 82'	Summary	Ballo 43'; Günlü 62'	Stadium: Lankaran City Stadium; Attendance: 9,500; Referee: Elchin Mämmädov

24 February 2013 21	Sumgayit	0–1	Turan	Baku
15:00 AZT (UTC+4)		Summary	Ballo 45'	Stadium: Bayil Stadium; Attendance: 200; Referee: Orkhan Mämmädov

3 March 2013 22	Turan	2–3	Neftchi	Tovuz
15:00 AZT (UTC+4)	Beraia 35'; Günlü 84'	Summary	Flavinho 11'; Abdullayev 61'; Imamverdiyev 75'	Stadium: Tovuz City Stadium; Attendance: 500; Referee: Elvin Äsgärov

==== League table ====
Pos	Team	Pld	W	D	L	GF	GA	GD	Pts	Qualification
7	AZAL	22	7	8	7	32	25	+7	29	Qualification for relegation group
8	Khazar Lankaran	22	7	7	8	32	27	+5	28	Qualification for relegation group
9	Turan	22	6	5	11	24	35	−11	23	Qualification for relegation group
10	Sumgayit	22	5	7	10	20	39	−19	22	Qualification for relegation group
11	Ravan Baku	22	6	4	12	23	36	−13	22	Qualification for relegation group

Source: Association of Football Federations of Azerbaijan and Soccerway.com
Rules for classification: 1) points; 2) goal difference; 3) number of goals scored.

=== Azerbaijan Premier League Relegation Group ===
==== Results summary ====
Overall								Home						Away					
Pld	W	D	L	GF	GA	GD	Pts	W	D	L	GF	GA	GD	W	D	L	GF	GA	GD
10	2	1	7	11	24	−13	7	1	1	3	10	16	−6	1	0	4	1	8	−7

Last updated: 20 May 2013.
Source: Soccerway

==== Results by round ====
Round	1	2	3	4	5	6	7	8	9	10
Ground	A	H	A	H	A	A	H	A	H	H
Result	L	L	L	D	W	L	L	L	L	W
Position	10	11	11	11	11	11	11	11	11	11

Updated to match(es) played on 20 May 2013. Source: Soccerway
A = Away; H = Home; W = Win; D = Draw; L = Loss

==== Results ====
11 March 2013 23	Sumgayit	4–0	Turan Tovuz	Baku
16:00 AZT (UTC+4)	Fardjad-Azad 5', 8', 19', 23'	Summary		Stadium: Bayil Stadium; Attendance: 300

30 March 2013 24	Turan Tovuz	2–6	Ravan Baku	Baku
15:00 AZT (UTC+4)	Mammadov 29'; F.Aliyev 34'	Summary	Kalonas 9', 60'; Varea 58', 61', 72' (pen.); Adamović 73'	Stadium: Dalga Arena; Attendance: 155; Referee: Vusal Äliyev

7 April 2013 25	AZAL	2–0	Turan Tovuz	Baku
17:30 AZST (UTC+5)	Nildo 16'; John 75'	Summary		Stadium: AZAL Stadium; Attendance: 500; Referee: Anar Salmanov

13 April 2013 26	Turan Tovuz	2–2	Khazar Lankaran	Baku
17:00 AZST (UTC+5)	Rukavina 22'; Günlü 69'	Summary	Abdullayev 42'; Alviž 67' (pen.)	Stadium: Dalga Arena; Attendance: 300; Referee: Elvin Äsgärov

20 April 2013 27	Kəpəz	0–1	Turan Tovuz	Baku
17:00 AZST (UTC+5)		Summary	Ballo 51'	Stadium: Dalga Arena; Attendance: 30; Referee: Omar Paşayev

27 April 2013 28	Ravan Baku	1–0	Turan Tovuz	Baku
17:00 AZST (UTC+5)	A.Mehdiyev 6'	Summary		Stadium: Dalga Arena; Attendance: 200; Referee: Namiq Bäkirov

3 May 2013 29	Turan Tovuz	0–2	AZAL	Baku
17:00 AZST (UTC+5)		Summary	Nildo 7', 27'; Taghiyev (yellow card) 28' (yellow-red card) 45+3'	Stadium: Dalga Arena; Attendance: 30; Referee: Rahim Häsänov

8 May 2013 30	Khazar Lankaran	1–0	Turan Tovuz	Lankaran
19:00 AZST (UTC+5)	Kazımlı 43'	Summary		Stadium: Lankaran City Stadium; Attendance: 3,500; Referee: Ramil Diniyev

13 May 2013 31	Turan Tovuz	3–5	Kəpəz	Baku
17:30 AZST (UTC+5)	Gadiri 44' (pen.); Ballo 59', 87'	Summary	Pashayev 47', 68', 75' (pen.); Asani 52'; Serebriakov 82'	Stadium: Dalga Arena; Attendance: 52; Referee: Ramil Ähmädov

20 May 2013 32	Turan Tovuz	2–1	Sumgayit	Baku
18:00 AZST (UTC+5)	Günlü 15' (pen.); Japaridze 17'	Summary	Gurbanov 55' (pen.); (red card) 83'	Stadium: Dalga Arena; Attendance: 100; Referee: Ramil Diniyev

==== Table ====
Pos	Team	Pld	W	D	L	GF	GA	GD	Pts	Qualification or relegation
8	Khazar Lankaran	32	10	10	12	40	37	+3	40	Qualification for Europa League first qualifying round (Note: Khazar Lankaran qualified for the first qualifying round of the 2013–14 UEFA Europa League as winner of the 2012–13 Azerbaijan Cup.)
9	Ravan Baku	32	12	4	16	46	53	−7	40	
10	Sumgayit	32	9	8	15	31	49	−18	35	
11	Turan (R)	32	8	6	18	34	59	−25	30	Relegation to Azerbaijan First Division
12	Kapaz (R)	32	5	4	23	22	64	−42	19	Relegation to Azerbaijan First Division

Source: Association of Football Federations of Azerbaijan
Rules for classification: 1) points; 2) goal difference; 3) number of goals scored.
(R) Relegated

=== Azerbaijan Cup ===
28 November 2012 Second Round	Turan Tovuz	1–1 (a.e.t.) (4–5 p)	Khazar Lankaran	Tovuz City Stadium
13:00 AZST (UTC+4)	F.Aliyev 2'; Popoviç (red card) 90+3'	Summary	Subašić 90+3' (pen.); Abdullayev (red card) 116'	Attendance: 1,500; Referee: Fariz Yusifov
	Penalties
	Penalty scored Penalty missed		Penalty scored

Notes

- Note 1: Turan Tovuz's game at home to Baku on 10 December was postponed due to a fire at the Tofig Bakhramov Stadium.

== Squad statistics ==
As of 21 May 2013

=== Appearances and goals ===
No.	Pos	Nat	Player	Total		Premier League		Azerbaijan Cup	
No.	Pos	Nat	Player	Apps	Goals	Apps	Goals	Apps	Goals
1	GK	(Azerbaijan) AZE	Kamal Bayramov	9	0	9+0	0	0+0	0
2	DF	(Ukraine) UKR	Dmitriy Pospelov	14	0	13+1	0	0+0	0
3	DF	(Kazakhstan) KAZ	Anatoli Stukalov	11	0	10+1	0	0+0	0
4	DF	(Azerbaijan) AZE	Vugar Baybalayev	9	0	5+4	0	0+0	0
5	DF	(Azerbaijan) AZE	Vasif Rzayev	4	0	1+3	0	0+0	0
6	DF	(Azerbaijan) AZE	Mikayil Rahimov	27	0	26+0	0	1+0	0
7	MF	(Azerbaijan) AZE	Azer Mammadov	27	3	19+7	3	0+1	0
8	MF	(Azerbaijan) AZE	Budag Nasirov	14	0	11+3	0	0+0	0
9	MF	(Azerbaijan) AZE	Murad Aghakishiyev	24	1	18+5	1	1+0	0
10	MF	(Azerbaijan) AZE	Hafiz Aliyev	16	0	13+2	0	1+0	0
11	FW	(Georgia (country)) GEO	Gogi Pipia	10	2	4+6	2	0+0	0
13	MF	(Georgia (country)) GEO	Nika Maisuradze	8	0	8+0	0	0+0	0
14	MF	(France) FRA	Ender Günlü	28	7	27+0	7	1+0	0
14	DF	(Ukraine) UKR	Yaroslav Sukhanov	1	0	1+0	0	0+0	0
15	FW	(Azerbaijan) AZE	Rashad Piriyev	2	0	0+1	0	0+1	0
16	MF	(Azerbaijan) AZE	Elmikhan Mammadov	2	0	2+0	0	0+0	0
16	MF	(Azerbaijan) AZE	Äbülfät Abbasov	4	0	3+1	0	0+0	0
17	DF	(Azerbaijan) AZE	Farmayil Aliyev	21	2	12+8	1	1+0	1
18	MF	(Azerbaijan) AZE	Seymur Taghiyev	2	0	0+2	0	0+0	0
19	MF	(Azerbaijan) AZE	Asef Gadiri	14	1	9+5	1	0+0	0
20	MF	(Georgia (country)) GEO	David Japaridze	15	1	7+8	1	0+0	0
21	MF	(Croatia) CRO	Anton Rukavina	27	2	25+1	2	1+0	0
21	DF	(Azerbaijan) AZE	Elshad Manafov	10	0	4+6	0	0+0	0
22	MF	(Mali) MLI	Salif Ballo	29	12	21+7	12	0+1	0
23	MF	(Azerbaijan) AZE	Räşad Hacızadä	2	0	1+1	0	0+0	0
24	MF	(Azerbaijan) AZE	Orxan İsmayılov	1	0	1+0	0	0+0	0
26	DF	(Ukraine) UKR	Aleksandr Krutskevich	27	1	26+0	1	1+0	0
27	GK	(Azerbaijan) AZE	Natiq Sahratov	3	0	2+1	0	0+0	0
28	GK	(Azerbaijan) AZE	Andrey Popoviç	16	0	14+1	0	1+0	0
	GK	(Azerbaijan) AZE	Mikayil Yusifov	2	0	2+0	0	0+0	0
	MF	(Azerbaijan) AZE	Sergey Chernyshev	1	0	0+1	0	0+0	0
Players who appeared for Turan Tovuz no longer at the club:
1	GK	(Croatia) CRO	Ivan Grabovac	5	0	5+0	0	0+0	0
2	DF	(Azerbaijan) AZE	Huseyn Isgandarov	3	0	2+1	0	0+0	0
3	DF	(Croatia) CRO	Ante Zurak	2	0	2+0	0	0+0	0
4	DF	(Georgia (country)) GEO	Levan Chkhetiani	4	0	3+1	0	0+0	0
5	FW	(Azerbaijan) AZE	Farid Guliyev	13	2	11+2	2	0+0	0
13	DF	(Azerbaijan) AZE	Bayram Karimov	2	0	1+1	0	0+0	0
13	DF	(Lithuania) LTU	Marius Kazlauskas	12	0	11+0	0	1+0	0
14	MF	(Georgia (country)) GEO	Aleksandr Gogoberishvili	2	0	2+0	0	0+0	0
23	MF	(Georgia (country)) GEO	Irakli Beraia	19	1	8+10	1	1+0	0
24	DF	(Ukraine) UKR	Ruslan Zubkov	11	0	10+0	0	1+0	0
25	MF	(Russia) RUS	Nugzar Kvirtiya	7	0	4+3	0	0+0	0

=== Goal scorers ===
Place	Position	Nation	Number	Name	Premier League	Azerbaijan Cup	Total
1	MF	(Mali)	22	Salif Ballo	12	0	12
2	MF	(France)	14	Ender Günlü	7	0	7
3	MF	(Azerbaijan)	7	Azer Mammadov	3	0	3
4	FW	(Georgia (country))	12	Gogi Pipia	2	0	2
4	FW	(Azerbaijan)	5	Farid Guliyev	2	0	2
4	DF	(Azerbaijan)	17	Farmayil Aliyev	1	1	2
4	MF	(Croatia)	21	Anton Rukavina	2	0	2
8	MF	(Azerbaijan)	9	Murad Aghakishiyev	1	0	1
8	DF	(Ukraine)	26	Aleksandr Krutskevich	1	0	1
8	MF	(Georgia (country))	23	Irakli Beraia	1	0	1
8	MF	(Azerbaijan)	19	Asef Gadiri	1	0	1
8	MF	(Georgia (country))	20	David Japaridze	1	0	1
				TOTALS	34	1	35

=== Disciplinary record ===
Number	Nation	Position	Name	Premier League		Azerbaijan Cup		Total	
Number	Nation	Position	Name	Yellow card	Red card	Yellow card	Red card	Yellow card	Red card
1	(Azerbaijan)	GK	Kamal Bayramov	2	0	0	0	2	0
2	(Ukraine)	DF	Dmitriy Pospelov	4	0	0	0	4	0
3	(Kazakhstan)	DF	Anatoli Stukalov	1	0	0	0	1	0
4	(Azerbaijan)	DF	Vugar Baybalayev	1	0	0	0	1	0
6	(Azerbaijan)	DF	Mikayil Rahimov	8	0	0	0	8	0
7	(Azerbaijan)	MF	Azer Mammadov	4	0	0	0	4	0
8	(Azerbaijan)	MF	Budag Nasirov	4	0	0	0	4	0
9	(Azerbaijan)	MF	Murad Aghakishiyev	5	0	1	0	6	0
11	(Georgia (country))	FW	Gogi Pipia	2	0	0	0	2	0
13	(Georgia (country))	DF	Nika Maisuradze	2	0	0	0	2	0
14	(France)	MF	Ender Günlü	3	0	0	0	3	0
17	(Azerbaijan)	DF	Farmayil Aliyev	3	0	1	0	4	0
19	(Azerbaijan)	MF	Asef Gadiri	2	0	0	0	2	0
20	(Georgia (country))	MF	David Japaridze	2	0	0	0	2	0
21	(Croatia)	MF	Anton Rukavina	6	0	0	0	6	0
22	(Mali)	MF	Salif Ballo	4	0	0	0	4	0
23	(Azerbaijan)	MF	Räşad Hacızadä	1	0	0	0	1	0
26	(Ukraine)	DF	Aleksandr Krutskevich	6	0	0	0	6	0
28	(Azerbaijan)	GK	Andrey Popoviç	1	0	0	1	1	1
Players who left Turan Tovuz during the season:
5	(Azerbaijan)	FW	Farid Guliyev	4	0	0	0	4	0
13	(Lithuania)	DF	Marius Kazlauskas	6	0	0	0	6	0
23	(Georgia (country))	MF	Irakli Beraia	2	0	0	0	2	0
24	(Ukraine)	DF	Ruslan Zubkov	3	0	0	0	3	0
25	(Russia)	MF	Nugzar Kvirtiya	1	0	0	0	1	0
			TOTALS	76	0	2	1	78	1
