= List of Azerbaijan football transfers summer 2012 =

This is a list of Azerbaijan football transfers in the summer transfer window 2012 by club. Only clubs of the 2012–13 Azerbaijan Premier League are included.

== Azerbaijan Premier League 2012–13 ==
=== AZAL Baku ===
In: Note: Flags indicate national team as defined under FIFA eligibility rules; some limited exceptions apply. Players may hold more than one non-FIFA nationality.

No.	Pos.	Nation	Player
2	DF	ESP	Juanfran (from (Spain) La Nucía)
4	DF	BRA	Aílton (from (Hungary) Ferencvárosi)
6	MF	AZE	Tagim Novruzov (from (Azerbaijan) Ravan)
7	MF	AZE	Javid Tagiyev (from (Azerbaijan) Turan Tovuz)
8	MF	TKM	Elman Tagaýew (from (Turkmenistan) Altyn Asyr)
15	DF	LAT	Oskars Kļava (from (Latvia) Liepājas Metalurgs)
16	FW	BRA	Nildo França Junior (from (Poland) Górnik Leczna)
18	FW	AZE	Rahman Musayev (from (Azerbaijan) Qaradağ)
21	FW	AZE	Yasin Abbasov (from (Azerbaijan) Sumgayit)
22	DF	AZE	Ruslan Tagizade (from (Azerbaijan) Neftchi Baku)
24	DF	UKR	Ruslan Zubkov (from (Ukraine) Odesa)
27	GK	AZE	Ruslan Majidov (from (Azerbaijan) Sumgayit)
28	MF	MDA	Artur Pătraş (from (Romania) Politehnica Timișoara)
37	MF	LTU	Andrius Velička (from (Lithuania) Ekranas)
77	FW	AZE	Arif Isayev (from (Azerbaijan) Gabala)
99	MF	AZE	Orkhan Hasanov (from (Azerbaijan) Neftchi Baku)
—	GK	AZE	Khayyam Hasanov (from (Azerbaijan) Shusha)

Out: Note: Flags indicate national team as defined under FIFA eligibility rules; some limited exceptions apply. Players may hold more than one non-FIFA nationality.

No.	Pos.	Nation	Player
2	DF	MKD	Robert Petrov
6	DF	LTU	Mindaugas Daunoravičius (to (Lithuania) FK Nevėžis)
10	MF	RUS	Nugzar Kvirtiya (to (Azerbaijan) Turan Tovuz)
13	DF	AZE	Shahriyar Rahimov (loan return to (Azerbaijan) Inter Baku)
15	FW	MDA	Gheorghe Boghiu (to (Moldova) Milsami)
19	MF	AZE	Huseyn Akhundov (to (Azerbaijan) Ravan Baku)
20	MF	KOS	Mensur Limani (to (Albania) KF Tirana)
23	FW	BRA	Tales Schutz (to (Azerbaijan) Inter Baku)
88	MF	ALB	Ervin Bulku (to (Iran) Sepahan)

=== Baku ===
In: Note: Flags indicate national team as defined under FIFA eligibility rules; some limited exceptions apply. Players may hold more than one non-FIFA nationality.

No.	Pos.	Nation	Player
2	DF	BOL	Edemir Rodríguez (from (Bolivia) Club Bolívar)
17	MF	AZE	Ramazan Abbasov (from (Azerbaijan) Ravan Baku)
22	FW	GRE	Vangelis Mantzios (from (Greece) OFI)
26	MF	ARG	Leandro Becerra (from (Greece) PAS Giannina)
27	DF	GEO	George Popkhadze (from (Austria) Sturm Graz)
29	DF	AZE	Aziz Guliyev (from (Azerbaijan) Inter Baku)
82	GK	MKD	Edin Nuredinoski (from (Cyprus) Ethnikos Achna)

Out: Note: Flags indicate national team as defined under FIFA eligibility rules; some limited exceptions apply. Players may hold more than one non-FIFA nationality.

No.	Pos.	Nation	Player
1	GK	CRO	Marko Šarlija (to (Cyprus) Olympiakos Nicosia)
4	DF	MDA	Vadim Boret (Retired)
23	GK	SEN	Kalidou Cissokho (Retired)
98	FW	ESP	Koke (to (Germany) Jahn Regensburg)

=== Gabala ===
In: Note: Flags indicate national team as defined under FIFA eligibility rules; some limited exceptions apply. Players may hold more than one non-FIFA nationality.

No.	Pos.	Nation	Player
5	DF	TUR	Muammer Erdoğdu (from (Azerbaijan) Turan Tovuz)
15	DF	GUI	Oumar Kalabane (from (United Arab Emirates) Al Dhafra)
23	DF	AZE	Shahriyar Khalilov (from (Azerbaijan) Khazar Lankaran)
25	GK	BRA	Diego (from (Portugal) Vitória)
27	MF	AZE	Rashad Abdullayev (from (Azerbaijan) Neftchi Baku)
30	GK	AZE	Anar Nazirov (loan return from (Azerbaijan) Turan Tovuz)
84	DF	SLO	Dejan Kelhar (from (Turkey) Samsunspor)

Out: Note: Flags indicate national team as defined under FIFA eligibility rules; some limited exceptions apply. Players may hold more than one non-FIFA nationality.

No.	Pos.	Nation	Player
4	DF	AZE	Mahir Shukurov (to (Azerbaijan) Neftchi Baku)
5	DF	AZE	Sergey Sokolov (Retired)
6	DF	SRB	Ljubo Baranin (to (Azerbaijan) Kəpəz)
10	FW	JAM	Deon Burton (to (England) Gillingham)
12	GK	LAT	Pāvels Doroševs (to (Latvia) Liepājas Metalurgs)
14	MF	SRB	Veseljko Trivunović (to (Serbia) OFK Beograd)
16	MF	GUI	Abdoul Kader Camara (to (Belgium) Verviétois joined in January 2013)
17	MF	AZE	Arif Isayev (to (Azerbaijan) AZAL)
20	DF	NED	Steve Olfers
22	FW	AZE	Murad Hüseynov (to (Azerbaijan) Sumgayit)
25	MF	AZE	Nuran Gurbanov (loan to (Azerbaijan) Ravan Baku)
30	GK	SCO	Graeme Smith (to (Scotland) Partick Thistle)
33	DF	AZE	Saşa Yunisoğlu (to (Azerbaijan) Neftchi Baku)

=== Inter Baku ===
In: Note: Flags indicate national team as defined under FIFA eligibility rules; some limited exceptions apply. Players may hold more than one non-FIFA nationality.

No.	Pos.	Nation	Player
5	MF	MKD	Slavčo Georgievski (from (Azerbaijan) Neftchi Baku)
7	MF	AZE	Ramil Hashimzade
10	FW	GEO	Giorgi Adamia (from (Azerbaijan) Qarabağ)
20	DF	CGO	Bruce Abdoulaye (from (France) Metz)
23	FW	BRA	Tales Schutz (from (Azerbaijan) AZAL)
30	FW	TOG	Arafat Djako (from (Russia) Anzhi Makhachkala)
47	MF	AZE	Abdulla Abatsiyev (from (Russia) Alania Vladikavkaz)
74	GK	GEO	Revaz Tevdoradze (from (Georgia (country)) Chikhura Sachkhere)
77	DF	AZE	Ruslan Amirjanov (from (Azerbaijan) Neftchi Baku)
87	DF	DOM	Heinz Barmettler (from (Switzerland) Zürich)
96	GK	AZE	Elshan Poladov (from (Azerbaijan) Kəpəz)

Out: Note: Flags indicate national team as defined under FIFA eligibility rules; some limited exceptions apply. Players may hold more than one non-FIFA nationality.

No.	Pos.	Nation	Player
2	DF	AZE	Khayal Mustafayev (to (Azerbaijan) Sumgayit)
5	DF	AZE	Rustam Abbasov (to (Azerbaijan) Simurq)
9	FW	BUL	Enyo Krastovchev (to (Bulgaria) Spartak Varna)
13	MF	CZE	Bronislav Červenka (to (Czech Republic) Zlín)
20	FW	LAT	Ģirts Karlsons (to (Latvia) Liepājas Metalurgs)
22	DF	SVK	Peter Chrappan (to (Slovakia) Banská Bystrica)
29	DF	AZE	Aziz Guliyev (to (Azerbaijan) Baku)
30	DF	BRA	Danildo Accioly (to (Portugal) Santa Clara)
99	GK	AZE	Anar Maharramov (to (Azerbaijan) Sumgayit)
16	FW	AZE	Elnur Abdulov (to (Azerbaijan) Qarabağ)

=== Kəpəz ===
In: Note: Flags indicate national team as defined under FIFA eligibility rules; some limited exceptions apply. Players may hold more than one non-FIFA nationality.

No.	Pos.	Nation	Player
1	GK	CRO	Ivan Radoš (loan from (Hungary) Diósgyőri)
3	MF	AZE	Vasif Hagverdiyev
9	MF	GEO	Irakli Beraia (from (Georgia (country)) Dila Gori)
9	FW	AZE	Bakhtiyar Soltanov (from (Azerbaijan) Qarabağ)
11	DF	GEO	Goga Beraia (from (Georgia (country)) Zestafoni)
13	MF	AZE	Emin Imamaliev (loan from (Azerbaijan) Qarabağ)
66	DF	SRB	Ljuba Baranin (from (Azerbaijan) Gabala)
88	MF	MKD	Bujamin Asani (from (North Macedonia) Skopje)
—	FW	AZE	Ilgar Nabiyev
—	GK	FRA	Arsène Ondobo (from (Belgium) F.C. Bleid-Gaume)

Out: Note: Flags indicate national team as defined under FIFA eligibility rules; some limited exceptions apply. Players may hold more than one non-FIFA nationality.

No.	Pos.	Nation	Player
6	DF	SLE	Sidney Kargbo
9	MF	GEO	Irakli Beraia (to (Azerbaijan) Turan Tovuz)
10	FW	AZE	Ceyhun Sultanov (to (Azerbaijan) Sumgayit)
14	MF	BLR	Dmitri Parkhachev (to (Kazakhstan) Kaisar)
19	MF	AZE	Zaur Asadov
20	FW	AZE	Elchin Seyidov
23	FW	BRA	Junivan Soares (Retired)
32	DF	ROU	Răzvan Ţârlea
66	DF	SRB	Ljuba Baranin (to (Serbia) Novi Pazar)
88	GK	AZE	Elshan Poladov (to (Azerbaijan) Inter Baku)
—	MF	AZE	Sabir Allahquliyev (to (Azerbaijan) Sumgayit City)

=== Khazar Lankaran ===
In: Note: Flags indicate national team as defined under FIFA eligibility rules; some limited exceptions apply. Players may hold more than one non-FIFA nationality.

No.	Pos.	Nation	Player
3	DF	ITA	Vanderson Scardovelli (from (Greece) PAS Giannina)
11	FW	GRE	Dimitris Sialmas (from (Greece) AEK Athens)
15	DF	AZE	Ruslan Abishov (from (Azerbaijan) Neftchi Baku)
27	DF	ROU	Adrian Scarlatache (from (Romania) Dinamo București)
55	FW	AZE	Aghabala Ramazanov (from (Azerbaijan) Neftchi Baku)
99	FW	BRA	Beto (from (Turkey) Mersin İdman Yurdu)
1	GK	AZE	Kamran Agayev (re-signed with (Azerbaijan) Khazar Lankaran)

Out: Note: Flags indicate national team as defined under FIFA eligibility rules; some limited exceptions apply. Players may hold more than one non-FIFA nationality.

No.	Pos.	Nation	Player
1	GK	AZE	Kamran Agayev (released, re-signed with (Azerbaijan) Khazar Lankaran)
3	MF	ALB	Elvin Beqiri (to (Albania) Vllaznia Shkodër)
7	MF	ROU	Cătălin Doman (to (Romania) Argeș Pitești)
11	MF	ROU	Andrei Mureşan (to (Romania) Astra Ploiești)
11	FW	CRC	Randall Brenes (to (Costa Rica) Cartaginés)
12	MF	MLI	Salif Ballo (to (Azerbaijan) Turan Tovuz)
22	MF	POR	António Semedo (Retired)
23	DF	AZE	Shahriyar Khalilov (to (Azerbaijan) Gabala)
33	DF	SRB	Stevan Bates (Loan return to (Serbia) FK Rad)
81	MF	BRA	Ricardo Gomes (to FC Andorra August 2013)

=== Neftchi Baku ===
In: Note: Flags indicate national team as defined under FIFA eligibility rules; some limited exceptions apply. Players may hold more than one non-FIFA nationality.

No.	Pos.	Nation	Player
3	DF	AZE	Saşa Yunisoğlu (from (Azerbaijan) Gabala)
4	DF	AZE	Tarlan Guliyev (on loan from (Azerbaijan) Sumgayit FC)
6	MF	AZE	Rashad Sadigov (from (Azerbaijan) Qarabağ)
10	MF	SLE	Julius Wobay (form (Egypt) Al-Masry)
11	FW	CHI	Nicolás Canales (from (Chile) Palestino)
15	MF	PAR	Eric Ramos (loan from (Paraguay) Rubio Ñu)
16	DF	BRA	Bruno Bertucci (from (Switzerland) Grasshoppers)
17	MF	AZE	Araz Abdullayev (from (England) Everton)
21	MF	AZE	Kamil Nurahmadov (on loan from (Azerbaijan) Sumgayit FC)
22	DF	AZE	Mahir Shukurov (from (Azerbaijan) Gabala)

Out: Note: Flags indicate national team as defined under FIFA eligibility rules; some limited exceptions apply. Players may hold more than one non-FIFA nationality.

No.	Pos.	Nation	Player
1	GK	AZE	Rauf Mehdiyev
2	DF	AZE	Rail Malikov (to (Turkey) Denizlispor)
3	DF	BRA	Denis Silva (to (Brazil) Grêmio)
6	MF	MKD	Slavčo Georgievski (to (Azerbaijan) İnter Baku)
11	MF	AZE	Javid Huseynov (to (Turkey) Adana Demirspor)
12	GK	AZE	Elchin Sadygov (to (Azerbaijan) Sumgayit FC)
13	DF	AZE	Tural Narimanov (to (Azerbaijan) AZAL)
15	DF	AZE	Ruslan Abishov (to (Azerbaijan) Khazar Lankaran)
16	DF	BRA	Alessandro
18	DF	AZE	Ruslan Amirjanov (to (Azerbaijan) Inter Baku)
21	FW	AZE	Aghabala Ramazanov (to (Azerbaijan) Khazar Lankaran)
22	FW	AZE	Farid Guliev (to (Azerbaijan) Sumgayit FC)
27	MF	AZE	Rashad Abdullayev (to (Azerbaijan) Gabala)
—	FW	AZE	Orkhan Hasanov (on loan to (Azerbaijan) AZAL)
—	DF	AZE	Ruslan Tagizade (to (Azerbaijan) AZAL)
—	GK	AZE	Eyyub Aliyev (on loan to (Azerbaijan) Simurg)
—	MF	AZE	Eshgin Guliyev
—	DF	AZE	Ruslan Amirjanov (to (Azerbaijan) Inter Baku)

=== Qarabağ ===
In: Note: Flags indicate national team as defined under FIFA eligibility rules; some limited exceptions apply. Players may hold more than one non-FIFA nationality.

No.	Pos.	Nation	Player
6	DF	AZE	Haji Ahmadov (from (Azerbaijan) Baku)
16	FW	AZE	Elnur Abdulov (from (Azerbaijan) Inter Baku)
20	MF	BRA	Richard (from (Portugal) Gil Vicente)
33	FW	EGY	Mostafa Afroto (from (Egypt) Al Ahly)
55	DF	AZE	Badavi Guseynov (from (Russia) Anzhi Makhachkala)
89	GK	CRO	Miro Varvodić (from (Germany) 1. FC Köln)

Out: Note: Flags indicate national team as defined under FIFA eligibility rules; some limited exceptions apply. Players may hold more than one non-FIFA nationality.

No.	Pos.	Nation	Player
6	MF	AZE	Rashad Sadigov (to (Azerbaijan) Neftchi Baku)
9	FW	AZE	Bakhtiyar Soltanov (loan to (Azerbaijan) Kapaz)
13	MF	AZE	Emin Imamaliev (loan to (Azerbaijan) Kapaz)
20	FW	MKD	Nderim Nedzipi (to (North Macedonia) Shkëndija)
21	FW	AZE	Murad Sattarly (loan to (Azerbaijan) Simurq)
77	FW	GEO	Giorgi Adamia (to (Azerbaijan) Inter Baku)
90	GK	SRB	Bojan Pavlović (to (Israel) Hapoel Ashkelon)

=== Ravan Baku ===
In: Note: Flags indicate national team as defined under FIFA eligibility rules; some limited exceptions apply. Players may hold more than one non-FIFA nationality.

No.	Pos.	Nation	Player
1	GK	POL	Łukasz Sapela (from (Poland) GKS Bełchatów)
5	DF	MDA	Nicolae Orlovschi (from (Moldova) Olimpia)
14	FW	ARG	Juan Manuel Varea (from (Bosnia and Herzegovina) Široki Brijeg)
19	MF	AZE	Huseyn Akhundov (from (Azerbaijan) AZAL)
23	FW	SLE	Sallieu Bundu (from (United States) Charleston Battery)
27	MF	AZE	Nuran Gurbanov (loan from (Azerbaijan) Gabala)
28	MF	AZE	Amit Guluzade (from (Turkey) Kayseri Erciyesspor)
33	MF	GHA	Francis Bossman (from (Serbia) Sloboda Užice)

Out: Note: Flags indicate national team as defined under FIFA eligibility rules; some limited exceptions apply. Players may hold more than one non-FIFA nationality.

No.	Pos.	Nation	Player
—	MF	AZE	Ramazan Abbasov (to (Azerbaijan) Baku)
5	DF	AZE	Natig Karimi
24	DF	AZE	Huseyn Isgandarov (to (Azerbaijan) Turan Tovuz)
25	DF	AZE	Ramil Nuriyev
23	FW	SLE	Sallieu Bundu (to (United States) VSI Tampa Bay)

=== Simurq ===
In: Note: Flags indicate national team as defined under FIFA eligibility rules; some limited exceptions apply. Players may hold more than one non-FIFA nationality.

No.	Pos.	Nation	Player
1	GK	AZE	Dmitriy Kramarenko (on loan from (Azerbaijan) Inter Baku)
4	DF	BIH	Dilaver Zrnanović (from (Bosnia and Herzegovina) Sarajevo)
6	DF	BRA	Anderson do Ó (from (Romania) FC Vaslui)
9	MF	POL	Marcin Burkhardt (from (Poland) Jagiellonia Białystok)
10	FW	BIH	Zdravko Popović (from (Greece) Levadiakos)
14	MF	AZE	Asif Mirili (on loan from (Azerbaijan) Inter Baku)
15	MF	CRO	Stjepan Poljak (from (Croatia) Slaven Belupo)
21	FW	AZE	Murad Sattarly (on loan from (Azerbaijan) Qarabağ)
22	GK	POL	Dawid Pietrzkiewicz (from (Czech Republic) Baník Ostrava)
25	MF	BIH	Mario Božić (from (China) Shanghai Shenhua)
28	DF	AZE	Rustam Abbasov (From (Azerbaijan) Inter Baku)
79	FW	SRB	Nenad Stojanović (from (Montenegro) Rudar Pljevlja)

Out: Note: Flags indicate national team as defined under FIFA eligibility rules; some limited exceptions apply. Players may hold more than one non-FIFA nationality.

No.	Pos.	Nation	Player
11	FW	LTU	Robertas Poškus (to (Russia) Sibir Novosibirsk)
19	FW	MDA	Anatolie Doroş (to (Moldova) CSCA–Rapid Chişinău)
29	MF	LAT	Igors Tarasovs (to (Latvia) Ventspils)
77	FW	BUL	Daniel Genov (loan return to (Azerbaijan) Inter Baku)
79	DF	LTU	Vidas Alunderis (to (Russia) Sibir Novosibirsk)

=== Sumgayit City ===
In: Note: Flags indicate national team as defined under FIFA eligibility rules; some limited exceptions apply. Players may hold more than one non-FIFA nationality.

No.	Pos.	Nation	Player
1	GK	AZE	Salahat Aghayev (on loan from (Azerbaijan) Inter Baku)
2	DF	AZE	Slavik Alkhasov (on loan from (Azerbaijan) Neftchi Baku)
3	DF	GER	Murat Doymus (from (Germany) Berliner AK 07)
5	MF	AZE	Aftandil Hajiyev (from (Azerbaijan) Turan Tovuz)
6	MF	TUR	Taner Taktak (from (Belgium) K. Patro Eisden Maasmechelen)
7	MF	IRI	Pardis Fardjad-Azad (from (Germany) Berliner AK 07)
10	FW	AZE	Ceyhun Sultanov (from (Azerbaijan) Kəpəz)
11	MF	AZE	Sabir Allahquliyev (from (Azerbaijan) Kəpəz)
12	GK	AZE	Elchin Sadigov (from (Azerbaijan) Neftchi Baku)
17	MF	AZE	Emin Jafarguliyev (from (Azerbaijan) Baku)
19	MF	RUS	Magomed Mirzabekov (from (Russia) Anzhi Makhachkala)
22	DF	TUR	Erdal Çelik (from (Turkey) Bucaspor)
22	DF	RUS	Khayal Mustafayev (from (Azerbaijan) Inter Baku)
35	MF	KGZ	Evgeniy Malinin
50	FW	AZE	Murad Hüseynov (from (Azerbaijan) Gabala)
90	GK	AZE	Anar Maharramov (from (Azerbaijan) Inter Baku)
91	FW	AZE	Ruslan Qurbanov (on loan from (Azerbaijan) Neftchi Baku)
—	MF	TUR	Muhammed Ali Atam (from (Turkey) Sivasspor)

Out: Note: Flags indicate national team as defined under FIFA eligibility rules; some limited exceptions apply. Players may hold more than one non-FIFA nationality.

No.	Pos.	Nation	Player
—	MF	AZE	Kamil Nurahmadov (loan to (Azerbaijan) Neftchi Baku)
4	DF	AZE	Tarlan Guliyev (loan to (Azerbaijan) Neftchi Baku)
7	MF	AZE	Mahmud Gurbanov (Retired)
22	DF	TUR	Erdal Çelik (to (Germany) FC 08 Homburg)
—	MF	TUR	Muhammed Ali Atam (to (Turkey) Dört Eylül Belediyespor)

=== Turan ===
In: Note: Flags indicate national team as defined under FIFA eligibility rules; some limited exceptions apply. Players may hold more than one non-FIFA nationality.

No.	Pos.	Nation	Player
1	GK	CRO	Ivan Grabovac (from (Croatia) Karlovac)
3	DF	CRO	Ante Zurak (from (Bosnia and Herzegovina) GOŠK Gabela)
4	MF	GEO	Levan Chkhetiani (from (Georgia (country)) Sioni Bolnisi)
6	DF	AZE	Mikayil Rahimov (from (Azerbaijan) Simurq)
9	MF	AZE	Murad Aghakishiyev
12	FW	GEO	Gogi Pipia (from (Georgia (country)) Zestafoni)
13	DF	LTU	Marius Kazlauskas (from (Lithuania) REO Vilnius)
14	MF	FRA	Ender Günlü (from (Turkey) Turgutluspor)
17	DF	AZE	Huseyn Isgandarov (from (Azerbaijan) Ravan Baku)
21	MF	CRO	Anton Rukavina (from (Croatia) Karlovac)
22	MF	MLI	Salif Ballo (from (Azerbaijan) Khazar Lankaran)
23	MF	GEO	Irakli Beraia (from (Azerbaijan) Kəpəz)
24	DF	UKR	Ruslan Zubkov (loan from (Azerbaijan) AZAL)
25	MF	RUS	Nugzar Kvirtiya (from (Azerbaijan) AZAL)
26	DF	UKR	Aleksandr Krutskevich (from (China) Harbin Yiteng)

Out: Note: Flags indicate national team as defined under FIFA eligibility rules; some limited exceptions apply. Players may hold more than one non-FIFA nationality.

No.	Pos.	Nation	Player
—	GK	AZE	Anar Nazirov (to (Azerbaijan) Gabala)
—	DF	TUR	Muammer Erdoğdu (to (Azerbaijan) Gabala)
11	MF	GEO	Giorgi Beriashvili (to (Georgia (country)) Torpedo Kutaisi)
16	DF	AZE	Rashad Orujov
20	FW	AZE	Ilkin Sadygov
14	MF	GEO	Aleksandr Gogoberishvili (to (Georgia (country)) Guria Lanchkhuti)
23	MF	AZE	Rashad Hajizade
27	GK	AZE	Kamil Sahratov
—	DF	AZE	Elhad Ahmadov
—	GK	AZE	Ramil Karimov (to (Azerbaijan) Taraggi)
