= List of Azerbaijan football transfers winter 2013 =

This is a list of Azerbaijan football transfers in the winter transfer window 2013 by club. Only clubs of the 2012–13 Azerbaijan Premier League are included.

== Azerbaijan Premier League 2012–13 ==
=== AZAL Baku ===
In: Note: Flags indicate national team as defined under FIFA eligibility rules; some limited exceptions apply. Players may hold more than one non-FIFA nationality.

No.	Pos.	Nation	Player
24	DF	UKR	Ruslan Zubkov (loan return from (Azerbaijan) Turan Tovuz)
28	MF	USA	Will John (from (United States) Missouri Comets)
32	MF	SRB	Vladimir Bogdanović (from (Greece) Panetolikos)
77	DF	AZE	Saşa Yunisoğlu (from (Azerbaijan) Neftchi Baku)
—	MF	AZE	Habil Nurəhmədov (from (Azerbaijan) Khazar Lankaran)

Out: Note: Flags indicate national team as defined under FIFA eligibility rules; some limited exceptions apply. Players may hold more than one non-FIFA nationality.

No.	Pos.	Nation	Player
5	DF	AZE	Agil Nabiyev (to (Azerbaijan) Baku)
8	MF	TKM	Elman Tagaýew (to (Turkmenistan) Aşgabat)
21	FW	AZE	Yasin Abbasov (to (Azerbaijan) Neftchala)
26	MF	AZE	Etibar Shahmardanov (to (Germany) SV Henstedt-Ulzburg)
28	MF	MDA	Artur Pătraş (to (Moldova) Politehnica Chişinău)
77	MF	AZE	Arif Isayev (to (Turkey) Denizlispor)

=== Baku ===
In: Note: Flags indicate national team as defined under FIFA eligibility rules; some limited exceptions apply. Players may hold more than one non-FIFA nationality.

No.	Pos.	Nation	Player
1	GK	AZE	Kamran Agayev (from (Azerbaijan) Khazar Lankaran)
5	DF	AZE	Agil Nabiyev (from (Azerbaijan) AZAL)
17	MF	ESP	Mario Rubio (from (Cyprus) Olympiakos Nicosia)
22	MF	SRB	Risto Ristović (from (Serbia) Novi Pazar)
23	FW	AZE	Rauf Aliyev (from (Azerbaijan) Qarabağ)
24	FW	ROU	Marius Pena (from (Romania) Oțelul Galați)
28	FW	TUR	Ferdi Elmas (from (Turkey) Karşıyaka)
88	FW	AZE	Javid Huseynov (from (Turkey) Adana Demirspor)

Out: Note: Flags indicate national team as defined under FIFA eligibility rules; some limited exceptions apply. Players may hold more than one non-FIFA nationality.

No.	Pos.	Nation	Player
5	DF	CRO	Duje Baković (released)
15	MF	AZE	Jamshid Maharramov (to (Azerbaijan) Kəpəz)
17	MF	AZE	Ramazan Abbasov (to (Azerbaijan) Ravan Baku)
20	DF	AZE	Elshad Manafov (loan to (Azerbaijan) Turan Tovuz)
22	FW	GRE	Vangelis Mantzios (to (Greece) Atromitos)
23	FW	LVA	Māris Verpakovskis (to (Greece) Ergotelis)
24	MF	SRB	Nenad Kovačević (to (Romania) UTA Arad)
26	MF	ARG	Leandro Becerra
36	FW	CRC	Winston Parks (to (Costa Rica) Uruguay Coronado)
—	DF	AZE	Elshad Manafov (loan to (Azerbaijan) Turan Tovuz)
—	DF	AZE	Vugar Baybalayev (loan to (Azerbaijan) Turan Tovuz)
—	DF	AZE	Vasif Rzayev (loan to (Azerbaijan) Turan Tovuz)
—	FW	AZE	Ulvi Guliyev (loan to (Azerbaijan) Turan Tovuz)

=== Gabala ===
In: Note: Flags indicate national team as defined under FIFA eligibility rules; some limited exceptions apply. Players may hold more than one non-FIFA nationality.

No.	Pos.	Nation	Player
4	MF	AZE	Amit Guluzade (from (Azerbaijan) Ravan Baku)
5	MF	SVN	Luka Žinko (from (Slovenia) Rudar Velenje)
6	DF	SRB	Nikola Valentić (from (Serbia) Jagodina)
8	DF	ROU	Cristian Pulhac (from (Romania) Dinamo București)
14	FW	SEN	Moustapha Dabo (from (Latvia) Spartaks Jūrmala)
16	DF	NGA	Ifeanyi Emeghara (from (Romania) Steaua București)
90	MF	AZE	Jeyhun Sultanov (from (Azerbaijan) Sumgayit)

Out: Note: Flags indicate national team as defined under FIFA eligibility rules; some limited exceptions apply. Players may hold more than one non-FIFA nationality.

No.	Pos.	Nation	Player
5	DF	TUR	Muammer Erdoğdu (to (Turkey) Kartalspor)
8	MF	BRA	Bruno Barbosa (to (Brazil) Atlético Ibirama)
88	DF	AZE	Nodar Mammadov (to (Azerbaijan) Ravan Baku)

=== Inter Baku ===
In: Note: Flags indicate national team as defined under FIFA eligibility rules; some limited exceptions apply. Players may hold more than one non-FIFA nationality.

No.	Pos.	Nation	Player
17	FW	BRA	Robertinho (from (Georgia (country)) Dinamo Tbilisi)
30	FW	UKR	Yuriy Fomenko (from (Azerbaijan) Kəpəz)
91	MF	BRA	Leo Rocha (from (Brazil) Olaria)

Out: Note: Flags indicate national team as defined under FIFA eligibility rules; some limited exceptions apply. Players may hold more than one non-FIFA nationality.

No.	Pos.	Nation	Player
17	MF	AZE	Aleksandr Gross (Released)
17	FW	BRA	Robertinho (Released)
30	FW	TOG	Arafat Djako (to (Israel) Bnei Sakhnin)
87	DF	DOM	Heinz Barmettler (to (Liechtenstein) FC Vaduz)

=== Kəpəz ===
In: Note: Flags indicate national team as defined under FIFA eligibility rules; some limited exceptions apply. Players may hold more than one non-FIFA nationality.

No.	Pos.	Nation	Player
1	GK	AZE	Ramil Karimov (from (Azerbaijan) Taraggi)
9	DF	RUS	Alan Soltanov
10	DF	AZE	Zaur Asadov
11	FW	AZE	Farid Guliyev (from (Azerbaijan) Turan Tovuz)
17	MF	TKM	Pirkuli Saparov (from (Turkmenistan) Altyn Asyr)
19	DF	TKM	Rahimberdy Baltayew (from (Turkmenistan) Aşgabat)
25	MF	AZE	Elgiz Karamli (from (Azerbaijan) Neftchi Baku)
30	FW	RUS	Vladislav Serebriakov

Out: Note: Flags indicate national team as defined under FIFA eligibility rules; some limited exceptions apply. Players may hold more than one non-FIFA nationality.

No.	Pos.	Nation	Player
1	GK	CRO	Ivan Radoš (Loan return to (Hungary) Diósgyőri)
3	DF	AZE	Tabriz Huseynli (Released)
4	DF	AZE	Azer Mammadov (retired)
9	FW	AZE	Bakhtiyar Soltanov (Loan return to (Azerbaijan) Qarabağ)
10	MF	CMR	Guy Feutchine (to (Malaysia) Suruhanjaya Perkhidmatan Awam)
13	MF	AZE	Emin Imamaliev (Loan return to (Azerbaijan) Qarabağ)
24	DF	AZE	Farid Hashimzade (Released)
28	FW	UKR	Yuriy Fomenko (to (Azerbaijan) Inter Baku)
—	GK	FRA	Arsène Ondobo (Released)

=== Khazar Lankaran ===
In: Note: Flags indicate national team as defined under FIFA eligibility rules; some limited exceptions apply. Players may hold more than one non-FIFA nationality.

No.	Pos.	Nation	Player
4	DF	ESP	Álvaro Silva (from (Spain) Xerez)
9	MF	AZE	Uğur Pamuk (from (Azerbaijan) Sumgayit)
24	FW	TUR	Gökhan Güleç (from (Turkey) Şanlıurfaspor)
30	GK	ESP	Toni Doblas (from (Spain) Real Zaragoza)
35	FW	ARG	Luciano Olguín (from (China) Shenyang Dongjin)
99	MF	CRO	Marin Oršulić (from (Croatia) NK Zagreb)

Out: Note: Flags indicate national team as defined under FIFA eligibility rules; some limited exceptions apply. Players may hold more than one non-FIFA nationality.

No.	Pos.	Nation	Player
1	GK	AZE	Kamran Agayev (to (Azerbaijan) Baku)
4	MF	AZE	Akif Taghiyev
6	MF	CRO	Robert Alviž (to (Kazakhstan) FC Atyrau)
9	FW	AZE	Branimir Subašić (to (Azerbaijan) Qarabağ)
27	MF	AZE	Habil Nurəhmədov (to (Azerbaijan) AZAL)
85	GK	AZE	Kamal Bayramov (to (Azerbaijan) Turan Tovuz)
99	FW	BRA	Beto (Released)

=== Neftchi Baku ===
In: Note: Flags indicate national team as defined under FIFA eligibility rules; some limited exceptions apply. Players may hold more than one non-FIFA nationality.

No.	Pos.	Nation	Player
1	GK	SUI	Johnny Leoni (loan from (Cyprus) Omonia)
2	MF	CHI	José Luis Cabión (from (Chile) Colo-Colo)
3	DF	BRA	Denis Silva (from (Brazil) Grêmio)

Out: Note: Flags indicate national team as defined under FIFA eligibility rules; some limited exceptions apply. Players may hold more than one non-FIFA nationality.

No.	Pos.	Nation	Player
1	GK	SUI	Johnny Leoni (loan return to (Cyprus) Omonia)
3	DF	AZE	Saşa Yunisoğlu (to (Azerbaijan) AZAL)
7	MF	BRA	Rodriguinho (to (Brazil) Sport)
18	MF	AZE	Elgiz Karamli (to (Azerbaijan) Kəpəz)
29	FW	AZE	Ilham Allahverdiyev (on loan at (Azerbaijan) Qaradağ)

=== Qarabağ ===
In: Note: Flags indicate national team as defined under FIFA eligibility rules; some limited exceptions apply. Players may hold more than one non-FIFA nationality.

No.	Pos.	Nation	Player
11	FW	AZE	Branimir Subašić (from (Azerbaijan) Khazar Lankaran)
15	FW	NGA	Emeka Opara (from (Kuwait) Al Naser)
21	MF	BRA	Reynaldo (from (Belgium) Anderlecht)
27	DF	AZE	Elvin Musazada (from (Azerbaijan) Ravan Baku)
88	MF	ARG	Cristián Torres (from (Azerbaijan) Ravan Baku)
—	MF	AZE	Emin Imamaliev (Loan return from (Azerbaijan) Kəpəz)
—	FW	AZE	Bakhtiyar Soltanov (Loan return from (Azerbaijan) Kəpəz)

Out: Note: Flags indicate national team as defined under FIFA eligibility rules; some limited exceptions apply. Players may hold more than one non-FIFA nationality.

No.	Pos.	Nation	Player
11	FW	AZE	Rauf Aliyev (to (Azerbaijan) Baku)
33	FW	EGY	Mostafa Afroto (to (Egypt) Misr El Makasa)
88	MF	AZE	Emin Mustafayev (to (Azerbaijan) Ravan Baku)
—	FW	AZE	Bakhtiyar Soltanov (Loan to (Azerbaijan) Simurq)

=== Ravan Baku ===
In: Note: Flags indicate national team as defined under FIFA eligibility rules; some limited exceptions apply. Players may hold more than one non-FIFA nationality.

No.	Pos.	Nation	Player
4	DF	AZE	Nodar Mammadov (from (Azerbaijan) Gabala)
10	MF	LTU	Mindaugas Kalonas (from (Poland) Stomil Olsztyn)
17	MF	AZE	Ramazan Abbasov (from (Azerbaijan) Baku)
20	MF	SRB	Miloš Adamović (from (Kazakhstan) Sunkar)
--	MF	AZE	Emin Mustafayev (from (Azerbaijan) Qarabağ)
--	MF	AZE	Ramil Hashimzade (from (Azerbaijan) Sumgayit)

Out: Note: Flags indicate national team as defined under FIFA eligibility rules; some limited exceptions apply. Players may hold more than one non-FIFA nationality.

No.	Pos.	Nation	Player
4	DF	BIH	Ekrem Hodžić (to (Bosnia and Herzegovina) Jedinstvo Bihać)
7	DF	AZE	Elvin Musazada (to (Azerbaijan) Qarabağ)
9	MF	AZE	Vüsal Qarayev (Released)
10	FW	SRB	Nemanja Vidaković (to (Kazakhstan) Ordabasy)
11	MF	SLE	Sheriff Suma (Released)
17	MF	AZE	Emin Ibrahimov
20	MF	ARG	Cristián Torres (to (Azerbaijan) Qarabağ)
26	MF	GHA	Francis Bossman (to (Serbia) Jagodina)
28	MF	AZE	Amit Guluzade (to (Azerbaijan) Gabala)

=== Simurq ===
In: Note: Flags indicate national team as defined under FIFA eligibility rules; some limited exceptions apply. Players may hold more than one non-FIFA nationality.

No.	Pos.	Nation	Player
12	FW	CRO	Tomislav Bušić (from (Croatia) Slaven Belupo)
27	FW	AZE	Bakhtiyar Soltanov (from (Azerbaijan) Qarabağ)
28	MF	BIH	Nenad Kiso (from (Hungary) Debreceni)

Out: Note: Flags indicate national team as defined under FIFA eligibility rules; some limited exceptions apply. Players may hold more than one non-FIFA nationality.

No.	Pos.	Nation	Player
79	FW	SRB	Nenad Stojanović (to (Montenegro) Rudar Pljevlja)

=== Sumgayit ===
In: Note: Flags indicate national team as defined under FIFA eligibility rules; some limited exceptions apply. Players may hold more than one non-FIFA nationality.

No.	Pos.	Nation	Player
76	MF	TUR	Can Akgün (from (Germany) Berliner AK 07)
77	MF	AZE	Mirzaga Huseynpur (from (Russia) MITOS Novocherkassk)
86	DF	AZE	Eldar Jankishiyev (loan from (Russia) Anzhi Makhachkala)
—	GK	AZE	Tarlan Ahmadli
—	MF	AZE	Emil Jabrailov

Out: Note: Flags indicate national team as defined under FIFA eligibility rules; some limited exceptions apply. Players may hold more than one non-FIFA nationality.

No.	Pos.	Nation	Player
10	MF	AZE	Jeyhun Sultanov (to (Azerbaijan) Gabala)
76	MF	AZE	Uğur Pamuk (to (Azerbaijan) FK Lankaran)
90	GK	AZE	Anar Maharramov

=== Turan ===
In: Note: Flags indicate national team as defined under FIFA eligibility rules; some limited exceptions apply. Players may hold more than one non-FIFA nationality.

No.	Pos.	Nation	Player
1	GK	AZE	Kamal Bayramov (from (Azerbaijan) Khazar Lankaran)
2	DF	UKR	Dmitriy Pospelov (from (Ukraine) Odesa)
3	DF	KAZ	Anatoli Stukalov (from (Kazakhstan) Tobol)
5	DF	AZE	Vasif Rzayev (loan from (Azerbaijan) Baku)
13	MF	GEO	Nika Maisuradze (from (Georgia (country)) Chikhura Sachkhere)
14	DF	UKR	Yaroslav Sukhanov
20	FW	GEO	David Janelidze (from (Georgia (country)) Metalurgi Rustavi)
—	GK	AZE	Mikayil Yusifov
—	DF	AZE	Elshad Manafov (loan from (Azerbaijan) Baku)
—	DF	AZE	Vugar Baybalayev (loan from (Azerbaijan) Baku)
—	MF	AZE	Sergey Chernyshev
—	FW	AZE	Ulvi Guliyev (loan from (Azerbaijan) Baku)

Out: Note: Flags indicate national team as defined under FIFA eligibility rules; some limited exceptions apply. Players may hold more than one non-FIFA nationality.

No.	Pos.	Nation	Player
1	GK	CRO	Ivan Grabovac (Released)
3	DF	CRO	Ante Zurak (to (Croatia) HNK Primorac Biograd na Moru)
4	DF	GEO	Levan Chkhetiani (to (Georgia (country)) Sioni Bolnisi)
5	FW	AZE	Farid Guliyev (to (Azerbaijan) Kəpəz)
11	MF	GEO	Gogi Pipia (to (Georgia (country)) Metalurgi Rustavi)
24	DF	UKR	Ruslan Zubkov (loan return to (Azerbaijan) AZAL)
25	MF	RUS	Nugzar Kvirtiya (Released)
26	DF	UKR	Aleksandr Krutskevich (Released)
27	GK	AZE	Natiq Sahratov (Released)
