= 2012–13 Sumgayit City F.C. season =

Sumgayit
2012–13 season
- Chairman: Kamran Guliyev
- Manager: Bernhard Raab
- Stadium: Mehdi Huseynzade Stadium
- Premier League: 10th
- Azerbaijan Cup: Second Round vs Baku
- Top goalscorer: League: Pardis Fardjad-Azad (9); All: Pardis Fardjad-Azad (9)
- Highest home attendance: 8,000 vs Qarabağ; 19 August 2012 vs Ravan Baku; 20 October 2012
- Lowest home attendance: 100 vs Kəpəz; 30 March 2013
- Average home league attendance: 2,094
Home colours	Away colours

The Sumgayit 2012–13 season is Sumgayit's second Azerbaijan Premier League season, and second season under Bernhard Raab. Sumgayit also competed in the 2012–13 Azerbaijan Cup, getting knocked out by Baku at the Second round stage.

== Squad ==
As of match played 20 May 2013

No.	Name	Nationality	Position	Date of birth (age)	Signed from	Signed in	Contract ends	Apps.	Goals
Goalkeepers
1	Salahat Aghayev	(Azerbaijan)	GK	4 January 1991 (aged 22)	loan from Inter Baku	2012	2013	23	0
12	Elchin Sadigov	(Azerbaijan)	GK	14 June 1989 (aged 23)	Neftchi Baku	2012		7	0
55	Tarlan Ahmadli	(Azerbaijan)	GK	21 November 1994 (aged 18)	Ravan Baku	2012		0	0
Defenders
2	Slavik Alkhasov	(Azerbaijan)	DF	6 February 1993 (aged 20)	loan from Neftchi Baku	2011	2013	50	0
4	Samir Abbasov	(Azerbaijan)	DF	1 February 1978 (aged 35)	Qarabağ	2011		57	3
5	Murat Doymuş	(Germany)	DF	19 April 1992 (aged 21)	Berliner AK	2012		26	1
17	Emin Jafarguliyev	(Azerbaijan)	DF	17 June 1990 (aged 22)	FC Baku	2012		24	1
21	Mahammad Mirzabeyov	(Russia)	DF	16 November 1990 (aged 22)	Anzhi Makhachkala	2012		28	1
22	Khayal Mustafayev	(Azerbaijan)	DF	27 December 1980 (aged 32)	Inter Baku	2012		14	0
86	Eldar Jankishiyev	(Azerbaijan)	DF	26 July 1994 (aged 18)	Anzhi Makhachkala	2013		0	0
92	Bakhtiyar Hasanalizade	(Azerbaijan)	DF	29 December 1992 (aged 20)	Trainee	2011		16	0
Midfielders
6	Taner Taktak	(Turkey)	MF	26 January 1990 (aged 23)	Maasmechelen	2012		20	1
8	Agshin Mukhtaroglu	(Azerbaijan)	MF	16 June 1992 (aged 20)	Trainee	2012		14	1
9	Orkhan Aliyev	(Azerbaijan)	MF	21 December 1995 (aged 17)	Trainee	2011		37	9
13	Murad Agayev	(Azerbaijan)	MF	9 February 1993 (aged 20)	Trainee	2012		31	1
25	Eldar Cankişiyev	(Azerbaijan)	MF	26 June 1994 (aged 18)	Trainee	2013		1	0
70	Shamil Jamaladdinov	(Azerbaijan)	MF	1 May 1995 (aged 18)	Trainee	2011		7	0
76	Can Akgün	(Turkey)	MF	2 October 1989 (aged 23)	Berliner AK	2013		13	1
77	Mirzaga Huseynpur	(Azerbaijan)	MF	11 March 1990 (aged 23)	MITOS Novocherkassk	2013		14	1
95	Ruslan Nasirli	(Azerbaijan)	MF	12 October 1995 (aged 17)	Trainee	2011		10	0
Forwards
7	Pardis Fardjad-Azad	(Azerbaijan)	FW	12 April 1988 (aged 25)	Berliner AK	2012		24	9
11	Sabir Allahquliyev	(Azerbaijan)	FW	12 May 1988 (aged 25)	Kapaz	2012		25	2
91	Ruslan Gurbanov	(Azerbaijan)	FW	12 September 1991 (aged 21)	loan from Neftchi Baku	2011	2013	40	8
Left during the season
2	Muhammed Ali Atam	(Turkey)	MF	21 May 1988 (aged 24)	Sivasspor	2012		2	0
3	Aftandil Hacıyev	(Azerbaijan)	DF	13 August 1981 (aged 31)	Turan-Tovuz	2012		17	1
10	Ceyhun Sultanov	(Azerbaijan)	MF	12 June 1979 (aged 33)	Kapaz	2012		16	1
22	Erdal Çelik	(Turkey)	DF	1 January 1988 (aged 25)	Bucaspor	2012		2	0
25	Aydin Gasimov	(Azerbaijan)	MF	22 September 1993 (aged 19)	Trainee	2012		1	0
27	Ramil Häşimzadä	(Azerbaijan)	MF	26 March 1991 (aged 22)	Trainee	2011		33	0
50	Murad Hüseynov	(Azerbaijan)	FW	25 January 1989 (aged 24)	Gabala	2012		5	0
76	Uğur Pamuk	(Azerbaijan)	MF	1 May 1995 (aged 18)	TuS Dornberg	2012		28	3
77	Arif Väliyev	(Azerbaijan)	FW	11 September 1992 (aged 20)	Trainee	2012		0	0
90	Anar Maharramov	(Azerbaijan)	GK	12 February 1992 (aged 21)	Inter Baku	2012		3	0
	Äbülfät Abbasov	(Azerbaijan)	MF	3 January 1993 (aged 20)	Trainee	2012		1	0

== Transfers ==
=== Summer ===
In: Note: Flags indicate national team as defined under FIFA eligibility rules; some limited exceptions apply. Players may hold more than one non-FIFA nationality.

No.	Pos.	Nation	Player
1	GK	AZE	Salahat Aghayev (on loan from (Azerbaijan) Inter Baku)
2	DF	AZE	Slavik Alkhasov (on loan from (Azerbaijan) Neftchi Baku)
3	DF	GER	Murat Doymus (from (Germany) Berliner AK 07)
5	MF	AZE	Aftandil Hajiyev (from (Azerbaijan) Turan Tovuz)
6	MF	TUR	Taner Taktak (from (Belgium) K. Patro Eisden Maasmechelen)
7	MF	AZE	Pardis Fardjad-Azad (from (Germany) Berliner AK)
10	FW	AZE	Ceyhun Sultanov (from (Azerbaijan) Kəpəz)
11	MF	AZE	Sabir Allahquliyev (from (Azerbaijan) Kəpəz)
12	GK	AZE	Elchin Sadigov (from (Azerbaijan) Neftchi Baku)
17	MF	AZE	Emin Jafarguliyev (from (Azerbaijan) Baku)
19	MF	RUS	Magomed Mirzabekov (from (Russia) Anzhi Makhachkala)
22	DF	TUR	Erdal Çelik (from (Turkey) Bucaspor)
22	DF	RUS	Khayal Mustafayev (from (Azerbaijan) Inter Baku)
35	MF	KGZ	Evgeniy Malinin
50	FW	AZE	Murad Hüseynov (from (Azerbaijan) Gabala)
90	GK	AZE	Anar Maharramov (from (Azerbaijan) Inter Baku)
91	FW	AZE	Ruslan Qurbanov (on loan from (Azerbaijan) Neftchi Baku)
—	MF	TUR	Muhammed Ali Atam (from (Turkey) Sivasspor)

Out: Note: Flags indicate national team as defined under FIFA eligibility rules; some limited exceptions apply. Players may hold more than one non-FIFA nationality.

No.	Pos.	Nation	Player
—	MF	AZE	Kamil Nurähmädov (loan to (Azerbaijan) Neftchi Baku)
4	DF	AZE	Tarlan Guliyev (loan to (Azerbaijan) Neftchi Baku)
7	MF	AZE	Mahmud Gurbanov (Retired)
22	DF	TUR	Erdal Çelik (to (Germany) FC 08 Homburg)
—	MF	TUR	Muhammed Ali Atam (to (Turkey) Dört Eylül Belediyespor)

=== Winter ===
In: Note: Flags indicate national team as defined under FIFA eligibility rules; some limited exceptions apply. Players may hold more than one non-FIFA nationality.

No.	Pos.	Nation	Player
76	MF	TUR	Can Akgün (from (Germany) Berliner AK)
77	MF	AZE	Mirzaga Huseynpur (from (Russia) MITOS Novocherkassk)
86	DF	AZE	Eldar Jankishiyev (loan from (Russia) Anzhi Makhachkala)
—	GK	AZE	Tarlan Ahmadli
—	MF	AZE	Emil Jabrailov

Out: Note: Flags indicate national team as defined under FIFA eligibility rules; some limited exceptions apply. Players may hold more than one non-FIFA nationality.

No.	Pos.	Nation	Player
10	MF	AZE	Jeyhun Sultanov (to (Azerbaijan) Gabala)
76	MF	AZE	Uğur Pamuk (to (Azerbaijan) FK Lankaran)
90	GK	AZE	Anar Maharramov

== Competitions ==
=== Azerbaijan Premier League ===
==== Results summary ====
Overall								Home						Away					
Pld	W	D	L	GF	GA	GD	Pts	W	D	L	GF	GA	GD	W	D	L	GF	GA	GD
22	5	7	10	20	39	−19	22	3	3	5	10	16	−6	2	4	5	10	23	−13

Last updated: 5 March 2013.
Source: Soccerway

==== Results ====
4 August 2012 1	Sumgayit	2–2	AZAL	Sumqayit
18:30 AZST (UTC+5)	Aliyev 44'; Fardjad-Azad 55'	Summary	Tagiyev 12'; Benouahi 67'	Stadium: Mehdi Huseynzade Stadium; Attendance: 2,400; Referee: Anar Salmanov

11 August 2012 2	Turan Tovuz	0–1	Sumgayit	Tovuz
18:00 AZST (UTC+5)		Summary	Pamuk (red card) 28'; Gurbanov 58' (pen.)	Stadium: Tovuz City Stadium; Attendance: 6,000; Referee: Elvin Askerov

19 August 2012 3	Sumgayit	1–6	Qarabağ	Sumqayit
18:00 AZST (UTC+5)	Hajiyev (red card) 20'; Allahquliyev 74'	Summary	Richard 14'; Sadygov 21' (pen.); Garayev (yellow card) 39' (yellow-red card) 44'; Nadirov 60'; Muarem 64'; Gurbanov 81'; Yusifov 90+1'	Stadium: Mehdi Huseynzade Stadium; Attendance: 8,000

25 August 2012 4	Gabala	4–1	Sumgayit	Qabala
19:00 AZST (UTC+5)	Bruno 33'; Kalabane 53', 71'; Abdullayev 55'	Summary	Gurbanov 18'	Stadium: Gabala City Stadium; Attendance: 2,500; Referee: Orkhan Mammadov

15 September 2012 5	Inter Baku	1–0	Sumgayit	Baku
18:00 AZST (UTC+5)	Djako 6'	Summary		Stadium: Shafa Stadium; Attendance: 300; Referee: Rauf Jabbarov

24 September 2012 6	Sumgayit	3–2	Neftchi Baku	Sumqayit
17:00 AZST (UTC+5)	Aliyev 12'; Fardjad-Azad 49'; Agayev 73'	Summary	Mustafayev 51' (o.g.); Canales 56'; Mehdiyev (red card) 90+1'	Stadium: Mehdi Huseynzade Stadium; Attendance: 3,000; Referee: Vusal Aliyev

30 September 2012 7	Sumgayit	1–0	Baku	Zaqatala
16:00 AZST (UTC+5)	Fardjad-Azad 38'	Summary		Stadium: Zaqatala City Stadium; Attendance: 5,500; Referee: Elvin Askerov

4 October 2012 8	Simurq	1–0	Sumgayit	Zaqatala
18:00 AZST (UTC+5)	Božić 63'	Summary		Stadium: Zaqatala City Stadium; Attendance: 2,200; Referee: Rauf Jabbarov

20 October 2012 9	Sumgayit	0–1	Ravan Baku	Sumqayit
16:00 AZST (UTC+5)		Summary	Varea 4'	Stadium: Mehdi Huseynzade Stadium; Attendance: 8,000; Referee: Fariz Yusifov

26 October 2012 10	Kəpəz	0–0	Sumgayit	Ganja
16:00 AZST (UTC+5)		Summary		Stadium: Ganja City Stadium; Attendance: 1,000; Referee: Rahim Hasanov

31 October 2012 11	Sumgayit	1–1	Khazar Lankaran	Sumqayit
16:00 AZT (UTC+4)	Hajiyev 53'	Summary	K. Kazımlı 74'	Stadium: Mehdi Huseynzade Stadium; Attendance: 1,800; Referee: Aliyar Ağayev

4 November 2012 12	Sumgayit	0–0	Inter Baku	Sumgayit
14:00 AZT (UTC+4)		Summary		Stadium: Mehdi Huseynzade Stadium; Attendance: 1,000; Referee: Rahim Hasanov

17 November 2012 13	Neftchi Baku	8–1	Sumgayit	Baku
15:00 AZT (UTC+4)	Canales 7', 23', 45', 80'; Wobay 11', 25'; Imamverdiyev 68'; Bertucci 75'	Summary	Jafarguliyev 28'	Stadium: Ismat Gayibov Stadium; Attendance: 1,200; Referee: Elvin Äsgärov

25 November 2012 14	AZAL	1–1	Sumgayit	Baku
16:00 AZT (UTC+4)	Fardjad-Azad 3'	Summary	Benouahi 9' (pen.)	Stadium: AZAL Arena; Attendance: 200; Referee: Äliyar Ağayev

2 December 2012 15	Sumgayit	0–1	Simurq	Sumqayit
14:00 AZT (UTC+4)		Summary	Poljak 45'	Stadium: Mehdi Huseynzade Stadium; Attendance: 2,500; Referee: Elvin Äsgärov

8 December 2012 16	Sumgayit	0–1	Gabala	Baku
14:00 AZT (UTC+4)		Summary	Mendy 39'; Chertoganov (red card) 61'	Stadium: Bayil Stadium; Attendance: 200; Referee: Elchin Mamedov

16 December 2012 17	Ravan Baku	2–3	Sumgayit	Baku
16:00 AZT (UTC+4)	N.Orlovschi 32'; Varea 83'	Summary	Fardjad-Azad 8'; Pamuk 79'; Sultanov 90+3' (pen.)	Stadium: Bayil Stadium; Attendance: 250; Referee: Rauf Jabbarov

20 December 2012 18	Sumgayit	2–1	Kəpəz	Sumqayit
16:00 AZT (UTC+4)	S.Allahquliyev 88'; Mirzabekov 90+1'	Summary	Imamaliev 47'; Asani (yellow card) 20' (yellow-red card) 74'	Stadium: Mehdi Huseynzade Stadium; Attendance: 150; Referee: Anar Salmanov

10 February 2013 19	Baku	1–1	Sumgayit	Baku
13:30 AZT (UTC+4)	Pena 29'; Nabiyev (yellow card) 58' (yellow-red card) 59'	Summary	Aliyev 12'	Stadium: Tofig Bakhramov Stadium; Attendance: 1,500

16 February 2013 20	Qarabağ	3–0	Sumgayit	Quzanlı
16:00 AZT (UTC+4)	Javadov 29'; Teli 83'; Sadygov 87'	Summary		Stadium: Guzanli Olympic Complex Stadium; Attendance: 350; Referee: Ramil Diniyev

24 February 2013 21	Sumgayit	0–1	Turan Tovuz	Baku
15:00 AZT (UTC+4)		Summary	Ballo 45'	Stadium: Bayil Stadium; Attendance: 200; Referee: Orkhan Mämmädov

3 March 2013 22	Khazar Lankaran	2–2	Sumgayit	Lankaran
15:00 AZT (UTC+4)	Alviž 14' (pen.), 66' (pen.)	Summary	Mirzaga Huseynpur 4'; Aliyev 47'	Stadium: Lankaran City Stadium; Attendance: 5,500; Referee: Ramil Diniyev

==== League table ====
Pos	Team	Pld	W	D	L	GF	GA	GD	Pts	Qualification
8	Khazar Lankaran	22	7	7	8	32	27	+5	28	Qualification for relegation group
9	Turan	22	6	5	11	24	35	−11	23	Qualification for relegation group
10	Sumgayit	22	5	7	10	20	39	−19	22	Qualification for relegation group
11	Ravan Baku	22	6	4	12	23	36	−13	22	Qualification for relegation group
12	Kapaz	22	2	4	16	12	45	−33	10	Qualification for relegation group

Source: Association of Football Federations of Azerbaijan and Soccerway.com
Rules for classification: 1) points; 2) goal difference; 3) number of goals scored.

=== Azerbaijan Premier League Relegation Group ===
==== Results summary ====
Overall								Home						Away					
Pld	W	D	L	GF	GA	GD	Pts	W	D	L	GF	GA	GD	W	D	L	GF	GA	GD
10	4	1	5	11	10	+1	13	4	0	1	10	3	+7	0	1	4	1	7	−6

Last updated: 20 May 2013.
Source: https://int.soccerway.com/national/azerbaijan/premyer-liqa/20122013/relegation-round/

==== Results by round ====
Round	1	2	3	4	5	6	7	8	9	10
Ground	H	H	A	H	A	A	H	A	H	A
Result	W	W	L	L	D	L	W	L	W	L
Position	9	10	10	10	10	10	10	10	10	10

Updated to match(es) played on 20 May 2013. Source: Soccerway
A = Away; H = Home; W = Win; D = Draw; L = Loss

==== Results ====
11 March 2013 23	Sumgayit	4–0	Turan-Tovuz	Baku
16:00 AZT (UTC+4)	Fardjad-Azad 5', 8', 19', 23'	Report	Aghakishiyev (yellow card) 10'; D.Pospelov (yellow card) 43'; S.Ballo (yellow card) 90+2'	Stadium: Bayil Arena; Attendance: 300; Referee: Orkhan Məmmədov

30 March 2013 24	Sumgayit	1–0	Kapaz	Baku
15:00 AZST (UTC+5)	S.Allahquliyev (yellow card) 53'; E.Cankişiyev (yellow card) 59'; M.Doymuş 67' (pen.); Mirzaga Huseynpur (yellow card) 90+2'	Report	E.Həsənəliyev (yellow card) 59'; M.Hüseynov (yellow card) 66'	Stadium: Bayil Arena; Attendance: 100; Referee: Elvin Äsgärov

7 April 2013 25	Ravan Baku	3–0	Sumgayit	Baku
17:00 AZST (UTC+5)	Kalonas 10' (yellow card) 20'; N.Orlovschi (yellow card) 54'; Adamović 79'; Barlay 90+1'	Report	B.Hasanalizade (yellow card) 28'; Abbasov (yellow card) 39'; Jafarguliyev (yellow card) 68'; Mirzaga Huseynpur (yellow card) 86'	Stadium: Dalga Arena; Attendance: 200; Referee: Aliyar Ağayev

14 April 2013 26	Sumgayit	0–2	AZAL	Baku
17:00 AZST (UTC+5)	B.Hasanalizade (yellow card) 21'; Mirzabeyov (yellow card) 31'; K.Mustafayev (yellow card) 85'	Report	R.Tagizade 6'; Nildo 30'; T.Novruzov (yellow card) 42'; Kļava (yellow card) 54'; T.Narimanov (yellow card) 89'	Stadium: Bayil Arena; Attendance: 200; Referee: Rauf Jabbarov

21 April 2013 27	Khazar Lankaran	0–0	Sumgayit	Lankaran
19:00 AZST (UTC+5)	Allahverdiyev (yellow card) 77'; Sialmas (yellow card) 89' (yellow-red card) 90+2'	Report	C.Akgün (yellow card) 12'; T.Taktak (yellow card) 27' (yellow-red card) 86'; B.Hasanalizade (yellow card) 57'	Stadium: Khazar Lankaran Central Stadium; Attendance: 2,000; Referee: Orkhan Mämmädov

27 April 2013 28	Kapaz	1–0	Sumgayit	Baku
17:00 AZST (UTC+5)	E.Kärämli (yellow card) 7'; C.Ahmadov (yellow card) 26'; P.Pashayev 69'; Soltanov (yellow card) 82'; T.Abbaszade (yellow card) 83'; B.Asani (yellow card) 86'; Guliyev (yellow card) 90+3'	Report	A.Mukhtaroglu (yellow card) 43'; Abbasov (yellow card) 54'; Jafarguliyev (yellow card) 90+4'	Stadium: Dalga Arena; Attendance: 50; Referee: Elvin Äsgärov

4 May 2013 29	Sumgayit	4–1	Ravan Baku	Baku
17:00 AZST (UTC+5)	T.Taktak (yellow card) 27' (goal) 30'; Gurbanov (yellow card) 29' (yellow-red card) 90+2' (goal) 50', 89'; C.Akgün 67' (yellow card) 82'	Report	Varea 34'; O.Lalayev (yellow card) 37' (yellow-red card) 44'; Barlay (yellow card) 55' (yellow-red card) 60'; Adamović (yellow card) 67'; Rahimov (yellow card) 72'; T.Mikayilov (yellow card) 90+2'	Stadium: Bayil Arena; Attendance: 150; Referee: Aliyar Ağayev

8 May 2013 30	AZAL	1–0	Sumgayit	Baku
18:00 AZST (UTC+5)	Nildo 70'; Bogdanović (yellow card) 81'	Report	S.Alkhasov (yellow card) 76'	Stadium: AZAL Arena; Attendance: 200; Referee: Elvin Äsgärov

13 May 2013 31	Sumgayit	1–0	Khazar Lankaran	Baku
17:30 AZST (UTC+5)	Gurbanov 14'; C.Akgün (yellow card) 36'; Abbasov (yellow card) 45'; Agayev (yellow card) 80'	Report	Scarlatache (yellow card) 50' (yellow-red card) 61'; Silva (yellow card) 84'	Stadium: Bayil Arena; Attendance: 250; Referee: Aliyar Ağayev

20 May 2013 32	Turan-Tovuz	2–1	Sumgayit	Baku
18:00 AZST (UTC+5)	Günlü 15' (pen.) (yellow card) 63'; Japaridze 17' (yellow card) 80'; D.Pospelov (yellow card) 51'; R.Hacızadä (yellow card) 55'	Report	E.Sadigov (yellow card) 14'; E.Mustafayev (yellow card) 19'; Qurbanov (yellow card) 30' (goal) 55' (pen.); T.Taktak (yellow card) 48' (yellow-red card) 82'; Jafarguliyev (yellow card) 79'; Mirzabeyov (yellow card) 85'	Stadium: Dalga Arena; Attendance: 100; Referee: Ramil Diniyev

==== Table ====
Pos	Team	Pld	W	D	L	GF	GA	GD	Pts	Qualification or relegation
8	Khazar Lankaran	32	10	10	12	40	37	+3	40	Qualification for Europa League first qualifying round (Note: Khazar Lankaran qualified for the first qualifying round of the 2013–14 UEFA Europa League as winner of the 2012–13 Azerbaijan Cup.)
9	Ravan Baku	32	12	4	16	46	53	−7	40	
10	Sumgayit	32	9	8	15	31	49	−18	35	
11	Turan (R)	32	8	6	18	34	59	−25	30	Relegation to Azerbaijan First Division
12	Kapaz (R)	32	5	4	23	22	64	−42	19	Relegation to Azerbaijan First Division

Source: Association of Football Federations of Azerbaijan
Rules for classification: 1) points; 2) goal difference; 3) number of goals scored.
(R) Relegated

=== Azerbaijan Cup ===
28 November 2012 Second Round	Baku	3–1	Sumgayit	Baku
13:15 AZT (UTC+4)	Verpakovskis 8', 11'; T.Gurbatov 39'; E.Manafov (yellow card) 70'	Report	Jafarguliyev (yellow card) 37'; K.Mustafayev (yellow card) 73'; Hüseynov 75' (pen.)	Stadium: Tofiq Bahramov Republican Stadium; Attendance: 200; Referee: Rauf Jabbarov

== Squad statistics ==
As of match played 20 May 2013

=== Appearances and goals ===
No.	Pos	Nat	Player	Total		Premier League		Azerbaijan Cup	
No.	Pos	Nat	Player	Apps	Goals	Apps	Goals	Apps	Goals
1	GK	(Azerbaijan) AZE	Salahat Aghayev	23	0	23	0	0	0
2	DF	(Azerbaijan) AZE	Slavik Alkhasov	28	0	28	0	0	0
4	DF	(Azerbaijan) AZE	Samir Abbasov	29	0	28	0	1	0
5	DF	(Germany) GER	Murat Doymuş	26	1	25+1	1	0	0
6	MF	(Turkey) TUR	Taner Taktak	20	1	13+7	1	0	0
7	FW	(Azerbaijan) AZE	Pardis Fardjad-Azad	24	9	21+2	9	0+1	0
8	MF	(Azerbaijan) AZE	Agshin Mukhtaroglu	14	0	6+7	0	1	0
9	MF	(Azerbaijan) AZE	Orkhan Aliyev	17	4	15+2	4	0	0
11	FW	(Azerbaijan) AZE	Sabir Allahquliyev	25	2	18+6	2	1	0
12	GK	(Azerbaijan) AZE	Elchin Sadigov	7	0	7	0	0	0
13	MF	(Azerbaijan) AZE	Murad Agayev	26	1	23+2	1	1	0
17	DF	(Azerbaijan) AZE	Emin Jafarguliyev	24	1	10+13	1	1	0
21	DF	(Russia) RUS	Mahammad Mirzabeyov	28	1	22+6	1	0	0
22	DF	(Azerbaijan) AZE	Khayal Mustafayev	14	0	10+3	0	1	0
70	MF	(Azerbaijan) AZE	Şamil Cämaläddinov	2	0	1	0	1	0
76	MF	(Turkey) TUR	Can Akgün	13	1	7+6	1	0	0
77	MF	(Azerbaijan) AZE	Mirzaga Huseynpur	14	1	12+2	1	0	0
91	FW	(Azerbaijan) AZE	Ruslan Gurbanov	24	6	19+5	6	0	0
92	DF	(Azerbaijan) AZE	Bakhtiyar Hasanalizade	13	0	12+1	0	0	0
95	MF	(Azerbaijan) AZE	Ruslan Nasirli	6	0	2+3	0	1	0
Players who left Sumgayit during the season:
2	MF	(Turkey) TUR	Muhammed Ali Atam	2	0	1+1	0	0	0
3	MF	(Azerbaijan) AZE	Aftandil Hacıyev	17	1	15+2	1	0	0
10	MF	(Azerbaijan) AZE	Ceyhun Sultanov	16	1	16	1	0	0
22	MF	(Turkey) TUR	Erdal Çelik	2	0	2	0	0	0
25	MF	(Azerbaijan) AZE	Aydin Gasimov	1	0	0	0	1	0
27	MF	(Azerbaijan) AZE	Ramil Häşimzadä	11	0	6+4	0	1	0
50	FW	(Azerbaijan) AZE	Murad Hüseynov	6	1	0+5	0	0+1	1
76	MF	(Azerbaijan) AZE	Uğur Pamuk	14	1	14	1	0	0
90	GK	(Azerbaijan) AZE	Anar Maharramov	3	0	2	0	1	0
	MF	(Azerbaijan) AZE	Äbülfät Abbasov	1	0	0	0	0+1	0

=== Goal scorers ===
Place	Position	Nation	Number	Name	Premier League	Azerbaijan Cup	Total
1	FW	(Azerbaijan)	7	Pardis Fardjad-Azad	9	0	9
2	FW	(Azerbaijan)	91	Ruslan Qurbanov	6	0	6
3	FW	(Azerbaijan)	9	Orkhan Aliyev	4	0	4
4	FW	(Azerbaijan)	10	Sabir Allahquliyev	2	0	2
5	FW	(Azerbaijan)	50	Murad Hüseynov	0	1	1
5	MF	(Azerbaijan)	3	Aftandil Hajiyev	1	0	1
5	MF	(Azerbaijan)	13	Murad Agayev	1	0	1
5	MF	(Azerbaijan)	17	Emin Jafarguliyev	1	0	1
5	DF	(Russia)	21	Magomed Mirzabekov	1	0	1
5	MF	(Azerbaijan)	10	Jeyhun Sultanov	1	0	1
5	MF	(Azerbaijan)	76	Uğur Pamuk	1	0	1
5	MF	(Azerbaijan)	77	Mirzaga Huseynpur	1	0	1
5	DF	(Germany)	5	Murat Doymuş	1	0	1
5	MF	(Turkey)	76	Can Akgün	1	0	1
5	MF	(Turkey)	6	Taner Taktak	1	0	1
				TOTALS	31	1	32

=== Disciplinary record ===
Number	Nation	Position	Name	Premier League		Azerbaijan Cup		Total	
Number	Nation	Position	Name	Yellow card	Red card	Yellow card	Red card	Yellow card	Red card
2	(Azerbaijan)	DF	Slavik Alkhasov	8	0	0	0	8	0
4	(Azerbaijan)	DF	Samir Abbasov	8	0	0	0	8	0
5	(Germany)	DF	Murat Doymuş	3	0	0	0	3	0
6	(Turkey)	MF	Taner Taktak	6	2	0	0	6	2
7	(Azerbaijan)	FW	Pardis Fardjad-Azad	8	0	0	0	8	0
8	(Azerbaijan)	MF	Agshin Mukhtaroglu	2	0	0	0	2	0
9	(Azerbaijan)	MF	Orkhan Aliyev	1	0	0	0	1	0
11	(Azerbaijan)	FW	Sabir Allahquliyev	3	0	0	0	3	0
12	(Azerbaijan)	GK	Elchin Sadigov	2	0	0	0	2	0
13	(Azerbaijan)	MF	Murad Agayev	5	0	0	0	5	0
17	(Azerbaijan)	DF	Emin Jafarguliyev	5	0	1	0	6	0
21	(Russia)	DF	Magomed Mirzabekov	6	0	0	0	6	0
22	(Russia)	DF	Khayal Mustafayev	4	0	1	0	5	0
70	(Azerbaijan)	MF	Şamil Cämaläddinov	1	0	0	0	1	0
76	(Turkey)	MF	Can Akgün	3	0	0	0	3	0
77	(Azerbaijan)	MF	Mirzaga Huseynpur	2	0	0	0	2	0
91	(Azerbaijan)	FW	Ruslan Qurbanov	6	1	0	0	6	1
92	(Azerbaijan)	DF	Bakhtiyar Hasanalizade	4	0	0	0	4	0
Players who left Sumgayit during the season:
3	(Azerbaijan)	DF	Aftandil Hajiyev	3	1	0	0	3	1
10	(Azerbaijan)	MF	Jeyhun Sultanov	2	0	0	0	2	0
25	(Azerbaijan)	MF	Aydin Gasimov	1	0	0	0	1	0
27	(Azerbaijan)	MF	Ramil Häşimzadä	3	0	0	0	3	0
76	(Azerbaijan)	MF	Uğur Pamuk	5	1	0	0	5	1
			TOTALS	91	5	2	0	93	5
