= Stukalov =

Stukalov (Russian: Стукалов) is a Russian masculine surname, its feminine counterpart is Stukalova. It may refer to:

- Anatoli Stukalov (born 1991), Russian football player
- Boris Stukalov (born 1953), Russian football manager and a former player
- Darya Stukalova (born 1994), Russian Paralympic swimmer
- Dmitry Stukalov (born 1951), Russian hurdler
- Nikolai Pogodin, pen name of the Soviet playwright Nikolai Stukalov (1900–1962)
