= 2012 A Lyga =

General Financing A Lyga
- Season: 2012
- Champions: Ekranas
- Relegated: REO
- Champions League: Ekranas
- Europa League: Žalgiris; Sūduva; Kruoja
- Matches played: 167
- Goals scored: 505 (3.02 per match)
- Top goalscorer: Artūras Rimkevičius
- Biggest home win: Žalgiris 7–0 Atlantas
- Biggest away win: Atlantas 0–5 Tauras
- Highest scoring: Šiauliai 7–3 Tauras

The 2012 A Lyga, also known as General Financing A Lyga for sponsoring purposes, was the 23rd season of the A Lyga, the top-tier football league of Lithuania. The season started on 10 March 2012 and ended on 11 November 2012. Ekranas were the defending champions.

== Changes from 2011 ==
The league changed its number of teams for the third time in a row, reducing it from twelve teams in 2011 to ten sides. As a consequence, the schedule expanded from 33 to 36 matches per team, which each team playing every other team four times in total, twice at home and twice away.

== Teams ==
On 2 February 2012, the Lithuanian Football Federation announced the teams which had passed the licensing criteria for the 2012 season. Among them were the best eight teams of the 2011 season, eleventh-placed FK Atlantas from Klaipėda and 2011 First League champions FK REO Vilnius. Tenth-placed side FBK Kaunas were only granted a First League licence, while FK Mažeikiai and FC Klaipėda did not apply for a licence in any of the top two Lithuanian football leagues. In July 2012, LFF banned REO from registering new players due to the club's debts to referees. On 21 July 2012, REO failed to appear on the match against Ekranas, and the game was awarded 3–0 to Ekranas with REO receiving a fine of 6000 Lithuanian Litas. REO have withdrawn from the competition in August 2012, after they were unable to attract investors. Since they have played more than half of matches in the season, according to the LFF rulebook, those matches were considered valid and all REO's upcoming matches were awarded 3–0 to their opponents.

=== Stadiums and locations ===
Location of teams in the 2012 A Lyga

| Club | Location | Stadium | 2011 season |
|---|---|---|---|
| Atlantas | Klaipėda | Žalgiris Stadium (Klaipėda) | 11th |
| Banga | Gargždai | Gargždai Stadium | 6th |
| Dainava | Alytus | | 8th |
| Ekranas | Panevėžys | Aukštaitija Stadium | 1st |
| Kruoja | Pakruojis | Pakruojis Stadium | 5th |
| REO | Vilnius | | I Lyga, 1st |
| Sūduva | Marijampolė | Sūduva Stadium | 3rd |
| Šiauliai | Šiauliai | Savivaldybė Stadium | 4th |
| Tauras | Tauragė | Vytauto Stadium | 7th |
| Žalgiris | Vilnius | LFF Stadium | 2nd |

== League table ==
| Pos | Team | Pld | W | D | L | GF | GA | GD | Pts | Qualification or relegation |
|---|---|---|---|---|---|---|---|---|---|---|
| 1 | Ekranas (C) | 36 | 27 | 7 | 2 | 83 | 25 | +58 | 88 | Qualification to Champions League second qualifying round |
| 2 | Žalgiris | 36 | 27 | 6 | 3 | 80 | 22 | +58 | 87 | Qualification to Europa League first qualifying round (Note: Winners of the 2012–13 Lithuanian Football Cup.) |
| 3 | Sūduva | 36 | 21 | 7 | 8 | 77 | 37 | +40 | 70 | Qualification to Europa League first qualifying round |
| 4 | Kruoja | 36 | 20 | 5 | 11 | 56 | 31 | +25 | 65 | Qualification to Europa League first qualifying round |
| 5 | Šiauliai | 36 | 17 | 4 | 15 | 79 | 57 | +22 | 55 | |
| 6 | Banga | 36 | 13 | 8 | 15 | 43 | 41 | +2 | 47 | |
| 7 | Dainava | 36 | 9 | 5 | 22 | 42 | 71 | −29 | 32 | |
| 8 | Atlantas | 36 | 7 | 6 | 23 | 33 | 92 | −59 | 27 | |
| 9 | Tauras | 36 | 7 | 2 | 27 | 35 | 97 | −62 | 23 | |
| 10 | REO (R) | 36 | 5 | 4 | 27 | 26 | 81 | −55 | 19 | Defunct in the middle of season |

Source: UEFA.com lff.lt
Rules for classification: 1) points; 2) goal difference; 3) number of goals scored.
(C) Champions; (R) Relegated

== Results ==
=== First half of season ===
| Home \ Away | ATL | BAN | DAI | EKR | KRU | REO | SŪD | ŠIA | TAU | ŽAL |
|---|---|---|---|---|---|---|---|---|---|---|
| Atlantas | | 1–1 | 0–0 | 0–3 | 0–1 | 0–0 | 0–4 | 0–3 | 0–5 | 0–1 |
| Banga | 0–1 | | 2–1 | 1–1 | 1–1 | 2–2 | 0–1 | 0–1 | 1–0 | 1–2 |
| Dainava | 1–0 | 0–0 | | 0–1 | 0–0 | 3–2 | 2–4 | 1–0 | 3–1 | 1–3 |
| Ekranas | 2–0 | 3–0 | 3–2 | | 1–0 | 3–0 | 2–0 | 2–2 | 5–0 | 1–0 |
| Kruoja | 5–1 | 1–0 | 2–0 | 1–1 | | 2–1 | 2–1 | 0–4 | 1–0 | 0–1 |
| REO | 3–0 | 1–0 | 1–0 | 0–1 | 2–2 | | 0–2 | 3–1 | 0–1 | 1–2 |
| Sūduva | 6–0 | 3–1 | 3–1 | 3–1 | 0–1 | 0–0 | | 4–1 | 1–0 | 0–0 |
| Šiauliai | 5–1 | 1–2 | 4–2 | 0–1 | 2–1 | 2–0 | 3–3 | | 7–3 | 2–2 |
| Tauras | 0–0 | 3–2 | 2–4 | 1–2 | 0–4 | 2–0 | 1–4 | 1–0 | | 0–2 |
| Žalgiris | 7–0 | 2–0 | 4–0 | 0–0 | 0–2 | 0–1 | 4–0 | 2–0 | 2–0 | |

Source: UEFA.com
Legend: Blue = home team win; Yellow = draw; Red = away team win.

=== Second half of season ===
| Home \ Away | ATL | BAN | DAI | EKR | KRU | REO | SŪD | ŠIA | TAU | ŽAL |
|---|---|---|---|---|---|---|---|---|---|---|
| Atlantas | | 2–2 | 2–1 | 1–2 | 2–1 | 4–2 | 1–5 | 1–2 | 4–1 | 3–4 |
| Banga | 1–0 | | 5–0 | 0–2 | 1–0 | 2–1 | 0–0 | 2–1 | 4–0 | 0–0 |
| Dainava | 1–2 | 0–4 | | 2–2 | 1–2 | 2–0 | 0–3 | 0–2 | 2–0 | 1–2 |
| Ekranas | 6–2 | 2–0 | 3–0 | | 2–0 | 3–0 (Note: walkover (see teams section)) | 2–2 | 3–0 | 5–0 | 0–0 |
| Kruoja | 5–0 | 2–1 | 2–0 | 0–2 | | 3–0 | 2–1 | 1–0 | 3–1 | 0–1 |
| REO | 0–3 | 0–3 | 0–3 | 0–3 | 0–3 | | 0–3 | 3–5 | 2–3 | 0–3 |
| Sūduva | 2–0 | 3–0 | 3–2 | 2–3 | 1–1 | 3–0 | | 1–0 | 4–1 | 1–2 |
| Šiauliai | 6–0 | 0–1 | 3–3 | 3–4 | 1–0 | 3–0 | 1–0 | | 7–2 | 2–4 |
| Tauras | 1–1 | 1–3 | 1–3 | 0–2 | 0–4 | 3–0 | 1–2 | 0–4 | | 0–4 |
| Žalgiris | 3–1 | 2–0 | 3–0 | 2–1 | 2–1 | 3–0 | 2–2 | 4–1 | 5–0 | |

Source: UEFA.com
Legend: Blue = home team win; Yellow = draw; Red = away team win.

== Top goalscorers ==
Including matches played on 29 October 2012

| Pos. | Player | Club | Goals |
|---|---|---|---|
| 1 | (Lithuania) Artūras Rimkevičius | Šiauliai | 35 |
| 2 | (Brazil) Rafael Ledesma | Sūduva | 21 |
| 3 | (Lithuania) Arsenij Buinickij | Ekranas | 17 |
| 3 | (Scotland) Calum Elliot | Žalgiris | 16 |
| 5 | (Ukraine) Serhiy Zhyhalov | Kruoja | 15 |
| 6 | (Poland) Kamil Bilinski | Žalgiris | 12 |
| 7 | (Lithuania) Povilas Lukšys | Sūduva | 11 |
| 8 | (Argentina) Santiago Cesanelli | Šiauliai | 10 |
| 8 | (Croatia) Tino Lagator | Atlantas | 10 |
| 8 | (Lithuania) Ramūnas Radavičius | Žalgiris | 10 |
| 11 | (Latvia) Igors Kozlovs | Šiauliai | 9 |
