= Marius Kazlauskas =

Lithuanian footballer

Personal information
- Date of birth: 1 May 1984 (age 42)
- Place of birth: Gargždai, Lithuania
- Height: 1.80 m (5 ft 11 in)
- Position: Fullback

Team information
- Current team: FK Navigatoriai

Youth career
- ?–2001: Atlantas Klaipėda

Senior career*
Years	Team	Apps	(Gls)
2001–2002	Atlantas Klaipėda	19	(0)
2003	Dynamo Moscow	0	(0)
2004	Ekranas	17	(0)
2005	FK Vilnius	21	(0)
2006	Žalgiris Vilnius	7	(0)
2007	Banga Gargždai	27	(1)
2008	Vėtra	21	(0)
2009–2010	Dunajská Streda	17	(1)
2010	AZAL PFC	0	(0)
2011	Banga Gargždai	24	(1)
2012	REO Vilnius	20	(0)
2012–2013	Turan Tovuz	11	(0)
2013–2015	Atlantas Klaipėda	61	(0)
2021–	FK Navigatoriai		
- * Club domestic league appearances and goals as of 19 May 2015

Marius Kazlauskas (born 1 May 1984) is a Lithuanian football defender who plays for III Lyga club FK Navigatoriai.
