= Bernhard Raab =

German footballer and manager

Personal information
- Full name: Bernhard Raab
- Date of birth: 17 March 1966 (age 60)
- Place of birth: Karlsbad, West Germany
- Height: 1.68 m (5 ft 6 in)
- Position: Forward

Senior career*
Years	Team	Apps	(Gls)
–1987	SV Langensteinbach		
1987–1989	Karlsruher SC		
1989–1990	Hessen Kassel		
1990–1992	1. FC Pforzheim		
1992–2000	SV Wehen Wiesbaden		
2000–2005	FV Biebrich 02		

Managerial career
- 2006–2008: FV Biebrich 02
- 2009: SV Wehen Wiesbaden
- 2010–2011: SV Wehen Wiesbaden II
- 2011–2013: Sumgayit
- 2014–2015: 1. FC Heidenheim (assistant)
- 2018–: 1. FC Heidenheim (assistant)
- * Club domestic league appearances and goals

Bernhard Raab (born 17 March 1966) is a German former football player and current manager. He is the current assistant head coach of Bundesliga club 1. FC Heidenheim.

== Career ==
Bernhard Raab played in the Bundesliga for Karlsruher SC from 1987 to 1990 and made 31 Bundesliga appearances during that time, scoring three goals. In the summer of 1987, he transferred from SV Langensteinbach to the amateur section of Bundesliga promoted Karlsruher SC. He made his Bundesliga debut as early as the eleventh matchday of the 1987/88 round in the away game at Borussia Dortmund. He was substituted for winger Helmut Hermann in the 37th minute and scored the 2-0 winner for the Badeners in the 80th minute. The 1.68 m tall winger played 17 games for KSC in this season and scored two goals. In 1989/90 he played 22 games for KSV Hessen Kassel in the 2. Bundesliga in which he scored four goals and from 1992 to 1999 he played for SV Wehen in the Regionalliga where he scored 7 goals in 99 games.

From 2006 to 2008, Raab was first a player, then a player-coach at the Wiesbaden club FV Biebrich 02. In July 2008, Raab became head of the youth development center at SV Wehen Wiesbaden. In April 2009, he additionally took over as interim manager at SVWW after the previous manager Uwe Stöver was dismissed. From summer 2011, he worked in Azerbaijan at Azerbaijan Premier League team Sumgayit PFC. Since April 2014, he has been with 1. FC Heidenheim as head of the youth development center. In July 2014, he also took over as coach of 1. FC Heidenheim's U19.
