= Ivan Grabovac (footballer, born 1983) =

Croatian footballer

Personal information
- Date of birth: 12 July 1983 (age 43)
- Place of birth: Rijeka
- Position: Goalkeeper

Senior career*
Years	Team	Apps	(Gls)
–2007	Orijent		
2007–2008	Istra 1961		
2008–2010	Karlovac	2	(0)
2010-2011	Akzhayik	16	(0)
2011–2012	Karlovac	1	(0)
2012	Turan Tovuz	5	(0)
2013–2014	Inter Zaprešić	32	(0)
- * Club domestic league appearances and goals

Ivan Grabovac (born 12 July 1983) is a retired Croatian football goalkeeper.
