= Anton Rukavina =

Croatian footballer

Personal information
- Full name: Antonio Rukavina
- Date of birth: 6 May 1985 (age 41)
- Place of birth: Rijeka, Croatia
- Height: 1.81 m (5 ft 11 1/2 in)
- Position: Midfielder

Senior career*
Years	Team	Apps	(Gls)
2004–2009	Pomorac Kostrena		
2009–2010	Skënderbeu Korçë	15	(1)
2010	Kastrioti	9	(0)
2010–2012	Rijeka	11	(0)
2012	Kalrovac	8	(0)
2012–2013	Turan Tovuz	26	(2)
2013	Krk		
2014	Nehaj Senj		
2014–2016	Opatija		
- * Club domestic league appearances and goals as of 3 October 2014

Anton Rukavina (born 6 May 1985) is a Croatian retired football player who last played as a midfielder for NK Opatija.

== Career ==
Rukavina previously spent five seasons playing for NK Pomorac in the Croatian Druga HNL and played for KF Skënderbeu Korçë and KS Kastrioti in Albanian Superliga.
