= Erdal Çelik =

Turkish-German footballer (born 1988)

Personal information
- Date of birth: 1 January 1988 (age 38)
- Place of birth: Gaziantep, Turkey
- Height: 1.88 m (6 ft 2 in)
- Position: Centre-back

Youth career
- TuS Schmidt
- –2007: Bayer Leverkusen

Senior career*
Years	Team	Apps	(Gls)
2007–2008	Alemannia Aachen II	8	(0)
2008–2011	Bayer Leverkusen II	31	(0)
2011	Rot-Weiss Ahlen	14	(1)
2011–2012	Bucaspor	8	(0)
2012	Sumgayit	2	(0)
2012–2013	FC Homburg	17	(0)
2013–2014	Wormatia Worms	19	(0)
Total		99	(1)
- * Club domestic league appearances and goals

Erdal Çelik (born 1 January 1988) is a Turkish-German former professional footballer who played as a centre-back.

== Personal life ==
After his retirement as a professional player, Çelik played for VfL Vichttal. He also worked as a youth trainer at his club, VfL Vichttal.
