= Ante Zurak =

Croatian footballer (born 1984)

Personal information
- Date of birth: 13 August 1984 (age 42)
- Place of birth: Zadar, SR Croatia, SFR Yugoslavia
- Height: 1.91 m (6 ft 3 in)
- Position: Centre-back

Senior career*
Years	Team	Apps	(Gls)
2005–2006	Zadar	6	(0)
2006–2008	Međimurje	52	(1)
2008–2009	Alta	28	(0)
2009–2011	Široki Brijeg	10	(1)
2010	→ Toronto Croatia (loan)		
2011	Mes Sarcheshmeh	14	(0)
2012	GOŠK Gabela	13	(0)
2012	Turan Tovuz	2	(0)
2012–2013	Primorac Biograd	3	(0)
- * Club domestic league appearances and goals

Ante Zurak (born 13 August 1984) is a Croatian former professional footballer who played as a centre-back.

== Playing career ==
Zurak played in the Croatian First Football League in 2002 with NK Zadar. In 2006, he signed with NK Međimurje, where he appeared in 47 matches. He went abroad in 2008 to sign with Alta IF in the Norwegian First Division. After a season in Norway he played with NK Široki Brijeg in the Premier League of Bosnia and Herzegovina. In 2010, he was loaned to Toronto Croatia of the Canadian Soccer League. He later went abroad to Asia to play with Mes Sarcheshmeh F.C., and Turan-Tovuz IK. In 2012, he returned to Croatia to play with HNK Primorac Biograd.
