= Anatoli Stukalov =

Russian-Kazakhstani footballer

Personal information
- Full name: Anatoli Andreyevich Stukalov
- Date of birth: 3 April 1991 (age 35)
- Place of birth: Starokazache, Ukrainian SSR
- Height: 1.78 m (5 ft 10 in)
- Position: Defender

Youth career
- FShM-Torpedo Moscow

Senior career*
| Years | Team | Apps | (Gls) |
| 2010 | CSKA Moscow | 0 | (0) |
| 2011–2012 | Tobol | 4 | (0) |
| 2012–2013 | Turan Tovuz | 11 | (0) |
| 2014–2015 | Arsenal-2 Tula | 17 | (0) |
- * Club domestic league appearances and goals

Anatoli Andreyevich Stukalov (Russian: Анатолий Андреевич Стукалов; born 3 April 1991) is a former Russian football player. He also holds Kazakhstani citizenship.

== Career ==
In February 2013, Stukalov moved from FC Tobol to Turan Tovuz.

He made his professional debut in the Russian Professional Football League for FC Arsenal-2 Tula on 11 September 2014 in a game against FC Fakel Voronezh.
