= FK REO Vilnius =

FK REO
- Full name: FK REO Vilnius
- Nickname(s): Juodai balti (The black whites)
- Founded: 2005
- Dissolved: 2012
- Ground: Žalgiris Stadium Vilnius
- Capacity: 15 030

FK REO Vilnius was a Lithuanian football team, based in the town of Vilnius. The club participated in the 2012 A Lyga, the top flight of Lithuanian football, but dissolved half-way through the season due to unpaid debts, pulling out of the league in August 2012.

== History ==
FK REO was initially founded in 2005 and dissolved in 2012.

The team reached the semi-finals of the 2011–12 Lithuanian Football Cup.
