= Ender Günlü =

French footballer (born 1984)

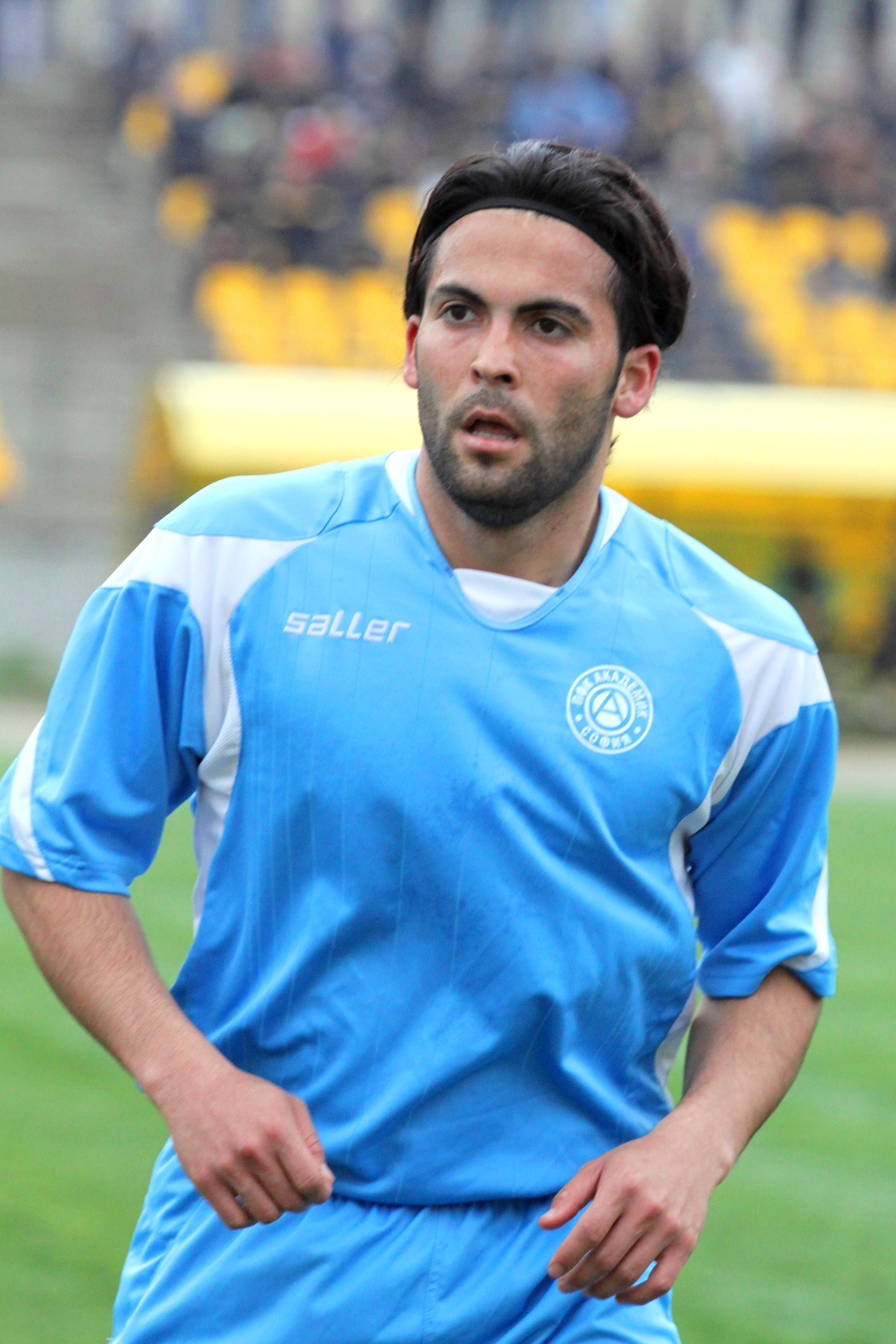

Personal information
- Date of birth: 9 May 1984 (age 42)
- Place of birth: Saint-Julien-en-Genevois, France
- Height: 1.75 m (5 ft 9 in)
- Position: Midfielder

Team information
- Current team: Sohar SC
- Number: 74

Youth career
- 2000–2003: Olympique Lyonnais

Senior career*
| Years | Team | Apps | (Gls) |
| 2003–2004 | Étoile Carouge | | |
| 2004–2005 | Urania Genève | | |
| 2005–2007 | Orihuela | | |
| 2007–2008 | Bursa Merinosspor | 11 | (0) |
| 2008 | EGS Gafsa | | |
| 2009 | Racing Genève | | |
| 2009–2010 | Olimpik-Shuvalan | 18 | (0) |
| 2010–2011 | Akademik Sofia | 17 | (5) |
| 2011–2012 | Turgutluspor | | |
| 2012–2013 | Turan Tovuz | 27 | (7) |
| 2013 | Eyüpspor | 9 | (0) |
| 2014– | Sohar SC | | |
- * Club domestic league appearances and goals as of 11 January 2014

Ender Günlü (born 9 May 1984) is a French footballer who plays as a midfielder for Sohar SC in the Omani League.

== Career ==
Günlü started his career in the youth team of Olympique Lyonnais before moving to the Swiss lower leagues in 2003 with Étoile Carouge and then Urania Genève Sport. In 2005 Günlü moved to Spain, where he spent two years with Orihuela before joining Bursa in Turkey in 2007 and then Tunisian side EGS Gafsa in 2008. After six months with EGS Gafsa he joined Racing Club Genève for six months in January 2009 before joining Olimpik-Shuvalan for the 2009–10 Azerbaijan Premier League season. Following Günlü's stint in Bulgaria he joined Akademik Sofia for a year and then signed for Turgutluspor in January 2012. Günlü spent 5 months at Turgutluspor. In 2012 Günlü returned to the Azerbaijan Premier League, joining Turan Tovuz, appearing 27 times with 7 goals and was the best midfielder of the championship. Günlü moved back to Turkey for the 2013–14 season with Eyüpspor, before joining Sohar SC in the Omani League for the rest of the 2014 season.

== Career statistics ==
As of 8 December 2013

| Club performance | | | League | | Cup | | Continental | | Total | |
| Season | Club | League | Apps | Goals | Apps | Goals | Apps | Goals | Apps | Goals |
|---|---|---|---|---|---|---|---|---|---|---|
| 2003–04 | Étoile Carouge | 1. Liga Classic | | | | | - | | | |
| 2004–05 | Urania Genève Sport | | | | | | - | | | |
| 2005–06 | Orihuela | Segunda División B | | | | | - | | | |
| 2006–07 | Orihuela | Segunda División B | | | | | - | | | |
| 2007–08 | Bursa | TFF 2. Lig | 11 | 0 | | | - | | 11 | 0 |
| 2008–09 | EGS Gafsa | CLP-1 | | | | | - | | | |
| 2008–09 | Racing Club Genève | 2. Liga | | | | | - | | | |
| 2009–10 | Olimpik-Shuvalan | Azerbaijan Premier League | 18 | 0 | | | - | | 18 | 0 |
| 2010–11 | Akademik Sofia | A PFG | 17 | 0 | | | - | | 17 | 0 |
| 2011–12 | Turgutluspor | Spor Toto 2. Lig | | 0 | 0 | 0 | - | | | 0 |
| 2012–13 | Turgutluspor | Spor Toto 2. Lig | 0 | 0 | 0 | 0 | - | | 0 | 0 |
| 2012–13 | Turan Tovuz | Azerbaijan Premier League | 27 | 7 | 1 | 0 | - | | 28 | 7 |
| 2013–14 | Eyüpspor | Spor Toto 2. Lig | 9 | 0 | 1 | 0 | - | | 9 | 0 |
| Career total | | | 49 | 7 | 2 | 0 | 0 | 0 | 51 | 2 |

== Honours ==
Étoile Carouge

- 1. Liga Classic: 2003–04

Orihuela

- Tercera División: 2005–06
