= Oleksandr Krutskevych =

Ukrainian footballer (born 1980)

Personal information
- Date of birth: 13 November 1980 (age 46)
- Place of birth: Kovel, Soviet Union
- Height: 1.96 m (6 ft 5 in)
- Position: Defender

Youth career
- FC Shakhtar-2 Donetsk

Senior career*
| Years | Team | Apps | (Gls) |
| 1997–1999 | FC Shakhtar-2 Donetsk | 13 | (0) |
| 2000–2001 | FC Kovel-Volyn Kovel | 14 | (2) |
| 2001 | FC Karpaty-3 Lviv | 1 | (0) |
| 2001 | FC Kovel-Volyn Kovel | 5 | (0) |
| 2002 | FC Podillya Khmelnytskyi | 3 | (0) |
| 2003 | FC Prylad-LDTU Lutsk | 6 | (1) |
| 2006–2009 | FC Zhetysu | | |
| 2008 | → FC Atyrau (loan) | | |
| 2009–2010 | FC Okzhetpes | | |
| 2010 | FC Zirka Kirovohrad | 4 | (0) |
| 2010–2011 | FC Feniks-Illichovets Kalinine | 3 | (0) |
| 2011–2012 | FK Daugava | 30 | (3) |
| 2012 | Harbin Yiteng | 3 | (0) |
| 2012–2013 | Turan Tovuz | 26 | (1) |
| 2013–2014 | Araz-Naxçıvan | 4 | (0) |
- * Club domestic league appearances and goals as of 22 October 2015

Oleksandr Krutskevych (Олександр Круцкевич, born 13 November 1980) is a retired Ukrainian professional footballer who played as a defender, last for Araz-Naxçıvan in the Azerbaijan First Division. Krutskevich played in the UEFA Intertoto Cup 2008.

Krutskevich began his playing career with FC Shakhtar-2 Donetsk.

Krutskevich was made a free agent when Araz-Naxçıvan folded and withdrew from the Azerbaijan Premier League on 17 November 2014.
