= Farid Guliyev =

Azerbaijani footballer (born 1986)

Personal information
- Full name: Farid Ruslan oglu Guliyev
- Date of birth: 6 January 1986 (age 40)
- Place of birth: Baku, Soviet Union
- Height: 1.81 m (5 ft 11 in)
- Position: Striker

Senior career*
Years	Team	Apps	(Gls)
2003–2005	Dinamo Baku	6	(0)
2005–2006	Qarabağ	7	(1)
2006–2008	Baku	26	(2)
2008–2009	→ Mughan (loan)	13	(4)
2009–2010	Standard Sumgayit	38	(16)
2010–2012	Neftchi Baku	24	(4)
2011	→ Simurq (loan)	5	(0)
2012	Sumgayit	0	(0)
2012–2013	Turan Tovuz	13	(2)
2013	Kapaz	12	(1)
2013	Kahramanmaraşspor	3	(0)
2014	Araz-Naxçıvan	9	(4)
2014	Sumgayit	5	(0)
2015	Shusha	6	(1)
2015	Ravan Baku	7	(0)
2016	Yozgatspor	6	(0)

International career
2010	Azerbaijan	7	(1)
- * Club domestic league appearances and goals

Farid Guliyev (Azerbaijani: Fərid Quliyev; born 6 January 1986 in Baku) is an Azerbaijani professional former footballer.

== Career ==
=== Club ===
In July 2013 Guliyev signed a one-year contract with Kahramanmaraşspor. In September 2014, after being released by Araz-Naxçıvan, Guliyev signed for Sumgayit.

== Career statistics ==
=== International ===
Azerbaijan football team
Year	Apps	Goals
2010	7	1
Total	7	1

Statistics accurate as of match played 3 September 2014

=== International goals ===
#	Date	Venue	Opponent	Score	Result	Competition
1.	3 March 2010	Stade Josy Barthel, Luxembourg (city), Luxembourg	Luxembourg	0–1	1-2	Friendly
Correct as of 3 March 2010

== Honors ==
=== Club ===
Neftchi Baku

- Azerbaijan Premier League (2): 2010–11, 2011–12

Araz-Naxçıvan

- Azerbaijan First Division (1): 2013–14

=== Individual ===
- Azerbaijan Premier League Top Scorer (1): 2009–10
