= 2014–15 Gabala FC season =

Gabala
2014-15 season
- Chairman: Tale Heydərov
- Manager: Dorinel Munteanu (14 June - 8 December 2014); Sanan Gurbanov(caretaker); 8-21 December 2014; Roman Hryhorchuk; 21 December 2014-
- Stadium: Gabala City Stadium
- Premier League: 3rd
- Azerbaijan Cup: Quarter-final (vs. Simurq)
- Europa League: First round (vs. Široki Brijeg)
- Top goalscorer: League: Javid Huseynov (11); All: Javid Huseynov (11)
- Highest home attendance: 4,200 (vs. Široki Brijeg, 3 July 2014)
- Lowest home attendance: 300 (vs. Sumgayit, 8 March 2015)
- Average home league attendance: 1,680; 29 May 2015
Home colours	Away colours	Third colours

The 2014–15 season was Gabala's tenth season overall and ninth competing in the Azerbaijan Premier League.

Following the 2013–14 Azerbaijan Cup final, Yuri Semin left the club. On 14 June 2014, Gabala announced Dorinel Munteanu as their new manager, on a one-year contract. On 8 December 2014, Munteanu was relieved of his duties as manager, following four wins in sixteen matches. Sanan Gurbanov was put in temporary charge following the departure of Munteanu, with Roman Hryhorchuk being announced as the club's new permanent manager following the club's 1–1 draw with Inter Baku on 21 December 2014.

== Squad ==
As of match played 28 May 2015

No.	Name	Nationality	Position	Date of birth (age)	Signed from	Signed in	Contract ends	Apps.	Goals
Goalkeepers
22	Dmytro Bezotosnyi	(Ukraine)	GK	15 November 1983 (aged 31)	Chornomorets Odesa	2015	2015	17	0
30	Anar Nazirov	(Azerbaijan)	GK	8 September 1985 (aged 29)	Sumgayit	2014	2016	27	0
55	Javidan Huseynzadeh	(Azerbaijan)	GK	7 March 1991 (aged 24)	Trainee	2013		1	0
Defenders
3	Shirmahammad Mammadov	(Azerbaijan)	DF	3 March 1995 (aged 20)	Trainee	2014		0	0
5	Sadig Guliyev	(Azerbaijan)	DF	9 March 1995 (aged 20)	Trainee	2012		17	0
7	Ruslan Amirjanov	(Azerbaijan)	DF	1 February 1985 (aged 30)	Inter Baku	2014	2015	9	0
12	Alexandru Benga	(Romania)	DF	15 June 1989 (aged 25)	Botev Plovdiv	2014	2015	7	0
13	Murad Musayev	(Azerbaijan)	DF	13 June 1994 (aged 20)	Trainee	2012		4	0
15	Ruslan Abışov	(Azerbaijan)	DF	10 October 1987 (aged 27)	Rubin Kazan	2015	2015	32	4
20	Ricardinho	(Brazil)	DF	9 September 1984 (aged 30)	Malmö	2015	2015	11	0
26	Pavol Farkaš	(Slovakia)	DF	27 March 1985 (aged 30)	Chievo Verona	2014	2015	14	2
28	İbrahim Aslanli	(Azerbaijan)	DF	1 December 1996 (aged 18)	Trainee	2014		0	0
34	Urfan Abbasov	(Azerbaijan)	DF	14 October 1992 (aged 22)	Qarabağ	2011		97	2
44	Rafael Santos	(Brazil)	DF	10 November 1984 (aged 30)	Arsenal Kyiv	2014	2016	51	0
Midfielders
4	Elvin Jamalov	(Azerbaijan)	MF	4 February 1995 (aged 20)	Trainee	2013		36	0
6	Rashad Sadiqov	(Azerbaijan)	MF	8 October 1983 (aged 31)	Khazar Lankaran	2015	2015	14	0
16	Ruslan Tagizade	(Azerbaijan)	MF	9 December 1993 (aged 21)	AZAL	2014	2016	38	0
17	Qismət Alıyev	(Azerbaijan)	MF	24 October 1996 (aged 18)	Trainee	2014		1	0
19	Oleksiy Gai	(Ukraine)	MF	6 November 1982 (aged 32)	Chornomorets Odesa	2015	2016	18	4
20	Rashid Amiraslanov	(Azerbaijan)	MF	4 May 1992 (aged 23)	Trainee	2012		1	0
25	Adrian Ropotan	(Romania)	MF	8 May 1986 (aged 29)	Volga Nizhny Novgorod	2014	2015	17	0
32	Mikhail Sivakow	(Belarus)	MF	16 January 1988 (aged 27)	Chornomorets Odesa	2015	2015	13	0
37	Kamal Mirzayev	(Azerbaijan)	MF	14 September 1994 (aged 20)	Trainee	2012		5	0
88	Mushfig Teymurov	(Azerbaijan)	MF	15 January 1993 (aged 22)	Trainee	2009		21	1
Forwards
9	Victor Mendy	(Senegal)	FW	22 December 1981 (aged 33)	Bucaspor	2011	2015	127	33
10	Dodô	(Brazil)	FW	16 October 1987 (aged 27)	Lokomotiva	2011	2016	127	23
14	Javid Huseynov	(Azerbaijan)	FW	9 March 1988 (aged 27)	FK Baku	2014	2015	34	12
18	Ruslan Fomin	(Ukraine)	FW	2 March 1986 (aged 29)	Chornomorets Odesa	2015	2015	17	0
27	Bakhtiyar Soltanov	(Azerbaijan)	FW	21 June 1989 (aged 25)	Araz-Naxçıvan	2014	2016	24	4
90	Ekigho Ehiosun	(Nigeria)	FW	25 June 1990 (aged 24)	on loan from Gençlerbirliği	2014	2015	32	6
99	Tellur Mutallimov	(Azerbaijan)	FW	8 April 1995 (aged 20)	Trainee	2014		0	0
Out on loan
	Seymur Asadov	(Azerbaijan)	MF	5 May 1994 (aged 21)	Trainee	2011		1	0
	Tarzin Jahangirov	(Azerbaijan)	MF	17 January 1992 (aged 23)	Trainee	2010		20	0
Left during the season
1	Kamran Aghayev	(Azerbaijan)	GK	9 February 1986 (age 40)	Baku	2014	2015	37	0
6	Volodimir Levin	(Azerbaijan)	DF	23 January 1984 (age 42)	Inter Baku	2013	2015	31	2
8	Marquinhos	(Brazil)	MF	28 May 1992 (age 34)	Oțelul Galați	2014	2016	13	1
11	Andrei Cristea	(Romania)	FW	15 May 1984 (age 42)	FC Brașov	2014	2015	10	0
21	Yazalde	(Portugal)	FW	21 September 1988 (age 38)	on loan from S.C. Braga	2014	2015	14	0

=== Out on loan ===
Note: Flags indicate national team as defined under FIFA eligibility rules; some limited exceptions apply. Players may hold more than one non-FIFA nationality.

No. / Pos. / Nation / Player; 13 / MF / AZE / Seymur Asadov (at AZAL)	No. / Pos. / Nation / Player; — / MF / AZE / Tarzin Jahangirov (at Sumgayit)

== Transfers ==
=== Summer ===
In: Note: Flags indicate national team as defined under FIFA eligibility rules; some limited exceptions apply. Players may hold more than one non-FIFA nationality.

No.	Pos.	Nation	Player
7	DF	AZE	Ruslan Amirjanov (from (Azerbaijan) Inter Baku)
8	MF	BRA	Marquinhos (from (Romania) Oțelul Galați)
11	FW	ROU	Andrei Cristea (from (Romania) FC Brașov)
12	DF	ROU	Alexandru Benga (from (Bulgaria) Botev Plovdiv)
14	FW	AZE	Javid Huseynov (from (Azerbaijan) FK Baku)
15	DF	AZE	Ruslan Abışov (loan from (Russia) Rubin Kazan)
21	FW	POR	Yazalde (loan from (Portugal) S.C. Braga)
25	MF	ROU	Adrian Ropotan (from (Russia) Volga Nizhny Novgorod)
26	DF	SVK	Pavol Farkaš (from (Italy) Chievo Verona)
27	FW	AZE	Bakhtiyar Soltanov (from (Azerbaijan) Araz-Naxçıvan)
90	FW	NGR	Ekigho Ehiosun (loan from (Turkey) Gençlerbirliği)

Out: Note: Flags indicate national team as defined under FIFA eligibility rules; some limited exceptions apply. Players may hold more than one non-FIFA nationality.

No.	Pos.	Nation	Player
2	DF	AZE	Rail Malikov (to (Turkey) Denizlispor)
3	DF	SRB	Nikola Valentić (to (Serbia) Jagodina)
4	MF	AZE	Amit Guluzade (to (Portugal) Atlético CP)
7	MF	RUS	Marat Izmailov (loan return to (Portugal) Porto)
8	MF	AZE	Nizami Hajiyev (to (Azerbaijan) Inter Baku)
13	MF	AZE	Seymur Asadov (loan to (Azerbaijan) AZAL)
14	MF	NED	Lorenzo Ebecilio (loan to (Russia) Mordovia Saransk, from (Ukraine) Metalurh Donetsk)
15	DF	GUI	Oumar Kalabane
17	MF	AZE	Nuran Gurbanov (to (Azerbaijan) Baku)
18	MF	SEN	Ibrahima Niasse (to (Russia) Mordovia Saransk)
19	FW	NGR	Abdulwaheed Afolabi (to (Moldova) Saxan Gagauz Yeri)
21	MF	AZE	Elmar Bakhshiev (Retired)
22	MF	BRA	Lourival Assis (to (Brazil) Bragantino)
25	GK	BRA	Diego (to (Portugal) Moreirense)
27	GK	POL	Dawid Pietrzkiewicz
31	FW	SUI	Danijel Subotić (to (Kuwait) Qadsia)
36	DF	AZE	Elnur Allahverdiyev (to (Azerbaijan) Neftchi Baku)
42	MF	BRA	Leonardo (to (Russia) Anzhi Makhachkala)
46	DF	TJK	Davron Ergashev (to (Kazakhstan) Zhetysu)
—	DF	ROU	Cristian Pulhac (to (Poland) Zawisza Bydgoszcz)
—	MF	AZE	Tarzin Jahangirov (loan return from (Azerbaijan) Sumgayit)
—	FW	AZE	Amil Yunanov (to (Azerbaijan) Ravan Baku)

=== Winter ===
In: Note: Flags indicate national team as defined under FIFA eligibility rules; some limited exceptions apply. Players may hold more than one non-FIFA nationality.

No.	Pos.	Nation	Player
6	MF	AZE	Rashad Sadiqov (from (Azerbaijan) Khazar Lankaran)
15	DF	AZE	Ruslan Abışov (from (Russia) Rubin Kazan)
18	FW	UKR	Ruslan Fomin (from (Ukraine) Chornomorets Odesa)
19	MF	UKR	Oleksiy Gai (from (Ukraine) Chornomorets Odesa)
20	DF	BRA	Ricardinho (from (Sweden) Malmö)
22	GK	UKR	Dmytro Bezotosnyi (from (Ukraine) Chornomorets Odesa)
32	MF	BLR	Mikhail Sivakow (from (Ukraine) Chornomorets Odesa)
—	DF	ZIM	Dennis Dauda (Trial)
—	FW	CIV	Senin Sebai (Trial)
—	FW	MLI	Ulysse Diallo (Trial)

Out: Note: Flags indicate national team as defined under FIFA eligibility rules; some limited exceptions apply. Players may hold more than one non-FIFA nationality.

No.	Pos.	Nation	Player
1	GK	AZE	Kamran Aghayev (to (Turkey) Kayserispor)
6	DF	AZE	Volodimir Levin
8	MF	BRA	Marquinhos
11	FW	ROU	Andrei Cristea (to (Italy) Salernitana)
21	FW	POR	Yazalde (loan return to (Portugal) S.C. Braga)

== Friendlies ==
15 June 2014	Stoynitsa (Slovenia)	0 – 1	(Azerbaijan) Gabala	Slovenia
AZST (UTC+5)		Report	Hajiyev 76'

18 June 2014	Koper (Slovenia)	1 – 0	(Azerbaijan) Gabala	Koper, Slovenia
AZST (UTC+5)		Report		Stadium: Bonifika Stadium

26 June 2014	Maribor (Slovenia)	0 – 1	(Azerbaijan) Gabala	Maribor, Slovenia
AZST (UTC+5)		Report	Rafael Santos 14'	Stadium: Ljudski vrt

17 July 2014	AFC Arnhem (Netherlands)	0 – 4	(Azerbaijan) Gabala	Netherlands
AZST (UTC+5)			Cristea; M.Musaev; Hajiyev

20 July 2014	AZ (Netherlands)	2 – 0	(Azerbaijan) Gabala	Netherlands
AZST (UTC+5)	Tanković 37', 73'	Report

23 July 2014	Konyaspor (Turkey)	0 – 2	(Azerbaijan) Gabala	Netherlands
17:00 AZST (UTC+5)	Farkaš 63'; Yazalde 78'

26 July 2014	Heerenven (Netherlands)	3 – 0	(Azerbaijan) Gabala	Netherlands
AZST (UTC+5)	van den Berg 47'	Report

2 August 2014	Qaradağ	1 – 2	Gabala	Baku
18:00 AZST (UTC+5)	Goal	Report	Huseynov; Hajiyev

10 January 2015	Jong PSV (Netherlands)	0 – 0	(Azerbaijan) Gabala	Antalya, Turkey
AZT (UTC+4)		Report

14 January 2014	Eskişehirspor (Turkey)	3 – 1	(Azerbaijan) Gabala	Antalya, Turkey
AZT (UTC+4)	Bayramoğlu 10'; Yıldırım 45'; Aydın 78'	Report	Marquinhos 87'

17 January 2014	Vorskla Poltava (Ukraine)	1 – 2	(Azerbaijan) Gabala	Antalya, Turkey
AZT (UTC+4)	Sichkaruk 40'	Report	Fomin 47'; Huseynov 86'

17 January 2014	Adanaspor (Turkey)	3 – 2	(Azerbaijan) Gabala	Antalya, Turkey
AZT (UTC+4)	B.Mustafazadə 35'; Marquinhos 65' (pen.); Ehiosun 83'	Report	Cem 26'; Hakan 72'

23 January 2014	Kuban Krasnodar (Russia)	2 – 0	(Azerbaijan) Gabala	Antalya, Turkey
13:00 AZT (UTC+4)	Tkachyov 3'; Baldé 14'; Popov (red card) 37'	Report

24 January 2014	Szombathelyi Haladás (Hungary)	0 – 2	(Azerbaijan) Gabala	Antalya, Turkey
AZT (UTC+4)		Report	Mendy 27'; E.Zamanov 75'

27 January 2014	Altyn Asyr (Turkmenistan)	3 – 3	(Azerbaijan) Gabala	Antalya, Turkey
AZT (UTC+4)	27'; 35'; 43'	Report	Huseynov 40' (pen.); Fomin 54', 63'

== Competitions ==
=== Overview ===
Competition	First match	Last match	Starting round	Final position	Record							
Competition	First match	Last match	Starting round	Final position	Pld	W	D	L	GF	GA	GD	Win %
Premier League	10 August 2014	28 May 2015	Matchday 1	3rd	32	15	9	8	46	35	+11	46.88
Azerbaijan Cup	3 December 2014	13 March 2015	Second Round	Quarterfinal	3	1	1	1	3	3	+0	33.33
UEFA Europa League	3 July 2014	10 July 2014	First qualifying round	First qualifying round	2	0	0	2	0	5	−5	0.00
Total					37	16	10	11	49	43	+6	43.24

Last updated: 28 May 2015
Source: Competitions

=== Premier League ===
==== Results summary ====
Overall								Home						Away					
Pld	W	D	L	GF	GA	GD	Pts	W	D	L	GF	GA	GD	W	D	L	GF	GA	GD
32	15	9	8	45	35	+10	54	6	6	4	21	17	+4	9	3	4	24	18	+6

Last updated: 28 May 2015.
Source: Soccerway

==== Results ====
10 August 2014 1	Inter Baku	4 – 0	Gabala	Baku
20:00 AZST (UTC+5)	Amisulashvili 9'; Álvaro 15', 71'; Mirzabekov 19'; Bocognano (yellow card) 85'	Summary	Abışov (yellow card) 82'	Stadium: Inter Arena; Attendance: 1,000; Referee: Aliyar Aghayev

17 August 2014 2	Gabala	Annulled^{2}	Araz-Naxçıvan	Qabala
20:00 AZST (UTC+5)	Huseynov 16' (pen.); Yazalde (yellow card) 55'; Ropotan (yellow card) 58'	Summary	Huseynov (yellow card) 26'; Zubkov (yellow card) 36'	Stadium: Gabala City Stadium; Attendance: 2,000; Referee: Rahim Häsänov

22 August 2014 3	Baku	0 – 2	Gabala	Baku
18:00 AZST (UTC+5)	E.Huseynov (yellow card) 58'	Summary	Mendy 78'; Cristea (yellow card) 86'; Abışov 90'	Stadium: Tofik Bakhramov Stadium; Attendance: 500; Referee: Vusal Äliyev

30 August 2014 4	Gabala	1 – 2	AZAL	Qabala
19:30 AZST (UTC+5)	Ropotan (yellow card) 3'; Farkaš (yellow card) 45+1'; Abışov (yellow card) 64'; Huseynov 82' (pen.)	Summary	Kļava (yellow card) 10'; Eduardo (yellow card) 31' (yellow-red card) 90+3'; Abdullayev 45+1' (pen.); L.Kasradze (yellow card) 56'; Ramos (yellow card) 65'; K.Diniyev 68' (yellow card) 69'; Namașco (yellow card) 90'	Stadium: Gabala City Stadium; Attendance: 2,800; Referee: Rauf Jabbarov

13 September 2014 5	Simurq	1 – 2	Gabala	Zaqatala
19:00 AZST (UTC+5)	Eyyubov 7' (pen.) (yellow card) 44'; V.Abdullayev (yellow card) 8'; Osiako (yellow card) 13'; Banaś (yellow card) 54'; T.Akhundov (yellow card) 54'	Summary	Benga (yellow card) 5' (yellow-red card) 86'; Ropotan (yellow card) 65'; Dodô 68', 80'; Huseynov (yellow card) 90+1'; Jamalov (yellow card) 90+4'	Stadium: Zaqatala City Stadium; Attendance: 2,500; Referee: Omar Paşayev

21 September 2014 6	Gabala	0 – 0	Neftchi Baku	Qabala
18:00 AZST (UTC+5)	Ropotan (yellow card) 13'; Amirjanov (yellow card) 28'; Farkaš (yellow card) 90+3'	Summary	M.Seyidov (yellow card) 37'; M.Isayev (yellow card) 39'; Cauê (yellow card) 79'; Ramos (yellow card) 88'	Stadium: Gabala City Stadium; Attendance: 2,500; Referee: Elvin Äsgärov

28 September 2014 7	Gabala	1 – 1	Khazar Lankaran	Qabala
19:00 AZST (UTC+5)	Huseynov (yellow card) 41' (goal) 47'; Jamalov (yellow card) 49'; Benga (yellow card) 58'; Abışov (yellow card) 70'	Summary	Ramaldanov (yellow card) 21'; Vanderson (yellow card) 80'; Blaževski 84'	Stadium: Gabala City Stadium; Attendance: 1,500; Referee: Omar Paşayev

17 October 2014 8	Qarabağ	2 – 0	Gabala	Baku
19:30 AZST (UTC+5)	Sadygov (yellow card) 17'; Teli (yellow card) 36'; Nadirov 45+2' (yellow card) 87'; Richard (yellow card) 54'; Reynaldo 89' (pen.)	Summary	Jamalov (yellow card) 30'; Benga (yellow card) 52'; Marquinhos (yellow card) 82'; M.Teymurov (yellow card) 88'; Ropotan (yellow card) 90+3'	Stadium: Tofiq Bahramov Stadium^{1} Attendance: 1,000; Referee: Rahim Häsänov

24 October 2014 9	Gabala	3 – 1	Sumgayit	Qabala
17:00 AZST (UTC+5)	Huseynov 77'; Farkaš 88'; Ehiosun 90+2'	Summary	Chertoganov (yellow card) 29'; R.Abbasov 40'; O.Aliyev (yellow card) 64'; Poladov (yellow card) 89'	Stadium: Gabala City Stadium; Attendance: 1,500; Referee: Vusal Äliyev

29 October 2014 10	Araz-Naxçıvan	Annulled^{2}	Gabala	Nakhchivan
14:00 AZT (UTC+4)	Huseynov (yellow card) 19'; T.Khalilov (yellow card) 65'; Nabiyev (yellow card) 69'	Summary	Farkaš 21'; Ropotan (yellow card) 51'; R.Tagizade (yellow card) 64'; Ehiosun (yellow card) 82'	Stadium: Nakhchivan City Stadium; Attendance: 4,600; Referee: Elvin Äsgärov

2 November 2014 11	Gabala	1 – 1	Baku	Qabala
15:30 AZT (UTC+4)	Dodô 5'; Jamalov (yellow card) 28'; Ropotan (yellow card) 41'; R.Tagizade (yellow card) 45+1'; Abışov (yellow card) 86'	Summary	Horvat (yellow card) 10'; E.Manafov (yellow card) 25' (yellow-red card) 90'; N.Gurbanov 45'; V.Baybalayev (yellow card) 50'; Jabá (yellow card) 90+3'	Stadium: Gabala City Stadium; Attendance: 1,000; Referee: Rahim Häsänov

20 November 2014 12	AZAL	3 – 3	Gabala	Baku
16:00 AZT (UTC+4)	Eduardo 32' (yellow card) 59'; V.Igbekoi 50'; Mombongo-Dues 80'; E.Yagublu (yellow card) 82'	Summary	Farkaš (yellow card) 18'; L.Kasradze 23' (o.g.); S.Guliyev (yellow card) 25'; Marquinhos 70'; R.Tagizade (yellow card) 78'; Huseynov 87' (pen.)	Stadium: AZAL Arena; Attendance: 200; Referee: Omar Paşayev

23 November 2014 13	Gabala	2 – 3	Simurq	Qabala
17:15 AZT (UTC+4)	R.Tagizade (yellow card) 22'; Ehiosun 40'; Ropotan (yellow card) 53'; B.Soltanov 90+2'	Summary	Stanojević 7'; Ćeran (yellow card) 57' (goal) 79', 83'; Qirtimov (yellow card) 65'	Stadium: Gabala City Stadium; Attendance: 1,000; Referee: Vusal Äliyev

29 November 2014 14	Neftchi Baku	0 – 0	Gabala	Baku
17:00 AZT (UTC+4)	Yunuszade (yellow card) 46'; Flavinho (yellow card) 46'; Cauê (yellow card) 66'; E.Badalov (yellow card) 89'	Summary	Huseynov (yellow card) 73'; Abışov (yellow card) 79'	Stadium: Bakcell Arena; Attendance: 1,000; Referee: Ingilab Mämmädov

7 December 2014 15	Khazar Lankaran	3 – 0	Gabala	Baku
17:00 AZT (UTC+4)	Ivanov 7'; Blaževski (yellow card) 28'; R.Tagizade 32' (o.g.); A.Ramazanov 50'; Amirguliyev (yellow card) 54'; Ramaldanov (yellow card) 79'	Summary	Abışov (yellow card) 26'; Huseynov (yellow card) 58'; Farkaš (yellow card) 82'; Ropotan (yellow card) 85'	Stadium: Bayil Stadium; Attendance: 500; Referee: Elvin Äsgärov

14 December 2014 16	Gabala	2 – 1	Qarabağ	Qabala
15:00 AZT (UTC+4)	U.Abbasov (yellow card) 45'; B.Soltanov 46'; Dodô 60' (yellow card) 90+2'; Aghayev (yellow card) 68'	Summary	N.Alasgarov 23'; Gurbanov (yellow card) 50'; Teli (yellow card) 80'	Stadium: Gabala City Stadium; Attendance: 500; Referee: Fariz Yusifov

18 December 2014 17	Sumgayit	1 – 1	Gabala	Sumqayit
15:00 AZT (UTC+4)	Chertoganov (yellow card) 33'; Kurbanov 67' (yellow card) 86'; T.Mikayilov (yellow card) 80'; T.Jahangirov (yellow card) 89'; O.Aliyev (yellow card) 90+1'	Summary	Ropotan (yellow card) 63'; Huseynov 86' (pen.)	Stadium: Kapital Bank Arena; Attendance: 1,500; Referee: Rahim Häsänov

21 December 2014 18	Gabala	1 – 1	Inter Baku	Qabala
15:00 AZT (UTC+4)	Ropotan (yellow card) 17'; Dodô 38'; Ehiosun (yellow card) 42'; R.Tagizade (yellow card) 66'; Nazirov (yellow card) 82'	Summary	Bocognano (yellow card) 42'; D.Meza (yellow card) 55'; Mirzabekov 67'; Mammadov (yellow card) 70' (yellow-red card) 87'; Lomaia (yellow card) 90+2'	Stadium: Gabala City Stadium; Attendance: 1,100; Referee: Fariz Yusifov

1 February 2015 19	Baku	0 – 2	Gabala	Baku
14:00 AZT (UTC+4)	Jabá (yellow card) 57'; N.Novruzov (yellow card) 84'	Summary	Huseynov 55' (pen.); V.Baybalayev 88' (o.g.)	Stadium: Tofik Bakhramov Stadium; Attendance: 500; Referee: Ingilab Mämmädov

6 February 2015 20	Gabala	0 – 1	AZAL	Qabala
14:00 AZT (UTC+4)	Jamalov (yellow card) 73'	Summary	A.Shemonayev (yellow card) 28'; O.Lalayev (yellow card) 70'; V.Igbekoi (yellow card) 75' (yellow-red card) 78'; Abdullayev 90+3' (pen.); S.Asadov (yellow card) 90+3'	Stadium: Gabala City Stadium; Attendance: 1,500; Referee: Rahim Häsänov

10 February 2015 21	Simurq	2 – 0	Gabala	Zaqatala
17:00 AZT (UTC+4)	Weitzman (yellow card) 14'; Ćeran 25', 45+3'; T.Akhundov (yellow card) 42'; Qirtimov (yellow card) 65'; V.Mustafayev (yellow card) 84'	Summary	Mendy (yellow card) 14'; Bezotosnyi (red card) 45+1'; Santos (yellow card) 55'	Stadium: Zaqatala City Stadium; Attendance: 2,000; Referee: Ingilab Mämmädov

15 February 2015 22	Gabala	1 – 3	Neftchi Baku	Qabala
18:00 AZT (UTC+4)	Mendy 10' (yellow card) 45'	Summary	Ramos (yellow card) 32'; Seyidov (yellow card) 45+1'; Wobay 58' (yellow card) 88'; Denis 71'; Flavinho 87'; E.Mehdiyev (yellow card) 87'	Stadium: Gabala City Stadium; Attendance: 1,500

19 February 2015 23	Gabala	3 – 1	Khazar Lankaran	Qabala
17:00 AZT (UTC+4)	Ehiosun 48'; Abışov (yellow card) 49' (goal) 77'; U.Abbasov 90+3'	Summary	S.Tounkara 33'; Ramaldanov (yellow card) 47'	Stadium: Gabala City Stadium; Attendance: 1,000; Referee: Rahim Häsänov

28 February 2015 24	Qarabağ	0 – 1	Gabala	Baku
17:00 AZT (UTC+4)	Medvedev (yellow card) 40'; Sadygov (yellow card) 45'	Summary	Dodô (yellow card) 28'; Ehiosun (yellow card) 34'; N.Alasgarov 44' (o.g.); Abışov (yellow card) 77'; R.Tagizade (yellow card) 82'	Stadium: Tofiq Bahramov Stadium^{1} Attendance: 1,000; Referee: Ingilab Mämmädov

8 March 2015 25	Gabala	2 – 0	Sumgayit	Qabala
18:00 AZT (UTC+4)	Mendy 23', 34'; U.Abbasov (yellow card) 45'; Jamalov (yellow card) 51'; Huseynov (yellow card) 51'; B.Soltanov (yellow card) 59'; Fomin (yellow card) 70'	Summary	B.Hasanalizade (yellow card) 14'	Stadium: Gabala City Stadium; Attendance: 300; Referee: Ingilab Mämmädov

18 March 2015 26	Inter Baku	1 – 2	Gabala	Baku
18:00 AZT (UTC+4)	D.Meza (yellow card) 32'; Amisulashvili 75'; Stanković (yellow card) 90'	Summary	Gai 40' (yellow card) 64'; Abışov 90+1'	Stadium: Inter Arena; Attendance: 450; Referee: Aliyar Aghayev

31 March 2015 27	Gabala	-^{2}	Araz-Naxçıvan	Qabala
AZST (UTC+5)		[ Summary]		Stadium: Gabala City Stadium

5 April 2015 28	AZAL	0 – 4	Gabala	Baku
17:00 AZST (UTC+5)	N.Mammadov (yellow card) 21'; Majidov (yellow card) 40'; Kutsenko (yellow card) 51'	Summary	Huseynov 24', 41' (pen.) (yellow card) 45'; Mendy 26'; Rafael Santos (yellow card) 47'; Ricardinho (yellow card) 66'; Abışov (yellow card) 79'; Ehiosun 86'	Stadium: AZAL Arena; Attendance: 500; Referee: Aliyar Aghayev

9 April 2015 29	Gabala	1 – 0	Simurq	Qabala
19:00 AZST (UTC+5)	Abışov 60'; Ehiosun (yellow card) 62'; Fomin (yellow card) 70'; B.Soltanov (yellow card) 71'; Huseynov (yellow card) 86'	Summary	V.Mustafayev (yellow card) 34'; S.Zargarov (yellow card) 79'	Stadium: Gabala City Stadium; Attendance: 3,000; Referee: Elvin Äsgärov

17 April 2015 30	Neftchi Baku	1 – 3	Gabala	Baku
20:00 AZST (UTC+5)	Canales 44'; Denis (yellow card) 54'; Cauê (yellow card) 61'; E.Mehdiyev (yellow card) 71'	Summary	Gai 25'; Huseynov 50'; U.Abbasov (yellow card) 54'; Jamalov (yellow card) 61'; Mendy (yellow card) 86'	Stadium: Bakcell Arena; Attendance: 1,500; Referee: Aliyar Aghayev

25 April 2015 31	Khazar Lankaran	0 – 1	Gabala	Lankaran
17:00 AZST (UTC+5)	E.Mirzəyev (yellow card) 6' (yellow-red card) 45+1'; Ramaldanov (yellow card) 31'; S.Tounkara (yellow card) 37'; A.Ramazanov (yellow card) 85'; E.İsmailov (yellow card) 87'	Summary	Huseynov 48'; Abışov (yellow card) 78'; R.Tagizade (yellow card) 86'; Jamalov (yellow card) 88'	Stadium: Lankaran City Stadium; Attendance: 2,200; Referee: Rahim Häsänov

2 May 2015 32	Gabala	1 – 1	Qarabağ	Qabala
19:00 AZST (UTC+5)	Abışov (yellow card) 36'; Ricardinho (yellow card) 53'; Sadiqov (yellow card) 60'; Huseynov 90' (pen.)	Summary	George (yellow card) 17'; Agolli (yellow card) 41'; Reynaldo 55'; Šehić (yellow card) 89'	Stadium: Gabala City Stadium; Attendance: 3,700; Referee: Elvin Äsgärov

8 May 2015 33	Sumgayit	0 – 2	Gabala	Sumqayit
18:00 AZST (UTC+5)	J.Hajiyev (yellow card) 44'; B.Nasirov (yellow card) 85'; M.Rahimov (yellow card) 87'	Summary	Jamalov (yellow card) 11'; Abışov (yellow card) 31'; Gai 39'; Mendy 42' (yellow card) 53'; R.Tagizade (yellow card) 63' (yellow-red card) 83'	Stadium: Kapital Bank Arena; Attendance: 1,500; Referee: Aliyar Aghayev

16 May 2015 34	Gabala	1 – 1	Inter Baku	Qabala
20:00 AZST (UTC+5)	Gai 5'; Sadiqov (yellow card) 74'	Summary	A.Mammadov 27'; Amisulashvili (yellow card) 53'; D.Meza (yellow card) 75'	Stadium: Gabala City Stadium; Attendance: 3,000; Referee: Fariz Yusifov

21 May 2015 35	Araz-Naxçıvan	-^{2}	Gabala	Nakhchivan
AZST (UTC+5)		[ Summary]		Stadium: Nakhchivan City Stadium

28 May 2015 36	Gabala	3 – 0	Baku	Qabala
20:00 AZST (UTC+5)	Mendy 7'; Ehiosun 13', 24'; Gai (yellow card) 33'; Q.Aliyev (yellow card) 73'; Santos (yellow card) 85'	Summary	E.Huseynov (yellow card) 23'; Q.Mähämmädov (yellow card) 60'; Q.Äliyev (yellow card) 89'	Stadium: Gabala City Stadium; Attendance: 2,200; Referee: Aliyar Aghayev

==== League table ====
Pos	Team	Pld	W	D	L	GF	GA	GD	Pts	Qualification
1	Qarabağ (C)	32	20	8	4	51	28	+23	68	Qualification for Champions League second qualifying round
2	Inter Baku	32	17	12	3	55	20	+35	63	Qualification for Europa League first qualifying round
3	Gabala	32	15	9	8	46	35	+11	54	Qualification for Europa League first qualifying round
4	Neftchi Baku	32	13	10	9	38	33	+5	49	Qualification for Europa League first qualifying round
5	Simurq	32	11	6	15	41	39	+2	39	
6	AZAL	32	10	9	13	37	42	−5	39	
7	Khazar Lankaran	32	8	8	16	35	46	−11	32	
8	Sumgayit	32	7	10	15	32	43	−11	31	
9	Baku	32	3	8	21	19	68	−49	17	Relegation to the Azerbaijan First Division
10	Araz-Naxçıvan (Note: Araz-Naxçıvan were officially withdrawn from the league on 17 November 2014)	0	0	0	0	0	0	0	0	Team withdrawn

Source: uefa.com
Rules for classification: 1) points; 2) head-to-head points; 3) head-to-head goal difference; 4) head-to-head goals scored; 5. head-to-head away goals (only if 2 teams are tied); 6) goal difference; 7) goals scored.
(C) Champions

=== Azerbaijan Cup ===
3 December 2014 Second Round	Gabala	3 – 0	Ağsu	Qabala
15:00 AZT (UTC+4)	B.Soltanov 2', 22'; Farkaš 64'	Summary	N.Karimi (yellow card) 39'	Stadium: Gabala City Stadium; Attendance: 400; Referee: Fariz Yusifov

4 March 2015 Quarterfinals 1st leg	Gabala	0 – 3	Simurq	Qabala
19:00 AZT (UTC+4)	U.Abbasov (yellow card) 41'; Dodô (yellow card) 61'	Summary	Ćeran 17', 55'; S.Zargarov (yellow card) 20'; Melli (yellow card) 30'; Lambot 57'; T.Akhundov (yellow card) 81'	Stadium: Gabala City Stadium; Attendance: 400; Referee: Aliyar Aghayev

13 March 2015 Quarterfinals 2nd leg	Simurq	0 – 0 (3 – 0 agg.)	Gabala	Zaqatala
17:00 AZT (UTC+4)	V.Mustafayev (yellow card) 4'; Qirtimov (yellow card) 59'	Summary	B.Soltanov (yellow card) 32'; Mendy (yellow card) 57'; Huseynov (yellow card) 75'; Santos (yellow card) 84'	Stadium: Zaqatala City Stadium; Attendance: 2,000; Referee: Ramil Diniyev

=== UEFA Europa League ===
==== Qualifying rounds ====
3 July 2014 First qualifying round 1st leg	Gabala (Azerbaijan)	0 – 2	(Bosnia and Herzegovina) Široki Brijeg	Qabala, Azerbaijan
20:00 AZST (UTC+5)	Ropotan (yellow card) 69'	Report	S.Brekal (yellow card) 62'; Wagner 74', 89'	Stadium: Gabala City Stadium; Attendance: 4,200; Referee: Artyom Kuchin (Kazakhstan)

10 July 2014 First qualifying round 2nd leg	Široki Brijeg (Bosnia and Herzegovina)	3 – 0 (5 – 0 agg.)	(Azerbaijan) Gabala	Široki Brijeg, Bosnia and Herzegovina
23:30 AZST (UTC+5)	Zakarić 17'; Pehar (yellow card) 21'; M. Marić 29', 56'	Report	Ropotan (yellow card) 10'; U.Abbasov (yellow card) 44'; Hajiyev (yellow card) 55'	Stadium: Stadion Pecara; Attendance: 1,500; Referee: Vladimir Vnuk (Slovakia)

== Squad statistics ==
As of Match played 28 May 2015

=== Appearances and goals ===
No.	Pos	Nat	Player	Total		Premier League		Azerbaijan Cup		Europa League	
No.	Pos	Nat	Player	Apps	Goals	Apps	Goals	Apps	Goals	Apps	Goals
4	MF	(Azerbaijan) AZE	Elvin Jamalov	34	0	23+6	0	1+2	0	1+1	0
5	DF	(Azerbaijan) AZE	Sadig Guliyev	12	0	4+4	0	1+1	0	1+1	0
6	MF	(Azerbaijan) AZE	Rashad Sadiqov	14	0	8+5	0	1	0	0	0
7	DF	(Azerbaijan) AZE	Ruslan Amirjanov	9	0	7	0	0	0	1+1	0
9	FW	(Senegal) SEN	Victor Mendy	29	8	20+5	8	2	0	2	0
10	FW	(Brazil) BRA	Dodô	20	5	14+2	5	2	0	2	0
12	DF	(Romania) ROU	Alexandru Benga	7	0	7	0	0	0	0	0
13	DF	(Azerbaijan) AZE	Murad Musayev	2	0	0+2	0	0	0	0	0
14	FW	(Azerbaijan) AZE	Javid Huseynov	32	11	29	11	1+2	0	0	0
15	DF	(Azerbaijan) AZE	Ruslan Abışov	32	4	26+1	4	3	0	2	0
16	MF	(Azerbaijan) AZE	Ruslan Tagizade	19	0	10+6	0	1	0	2	0
17	MF	(Azerbaijan) AZE	Qismət Alıyev	1	0	0+1	0	0	0	0	0
18	FW	(Ukraine) UKR	Ruslan Fomin	18	0	9+7	0	0+2	0	0	0
19	MF	(Ukraine) UKR	Oleksiy Gai	17	4	15	4	2	0	0	0
20	DF	(Brazil) BRA	Ricardinho	11	0	9+1	0	0+1	0	0	0
22	GK	(Ukraine) UKR	Dmytro Bezotosnyi	17	0	15	0	2	0	0	0
25	MF	(Romania) ROU	Adrian Ropotan	17	0	14	0	1	0	2	0
26	DF	(Slovakia) SVK	Pavol Farkaš	14	2	11+2	1	1	1	0	0
27	FW	(Azerbaijan) AZE	Bakhtiyar Soltanov	24	4	17+4	2	3	2	0	0
30	GK	(Azerbaijan) AZE	Anar Nazirov	4	0	2+1	0	1	0	0	0
32	MF	(Belarus) BLR	Mikhail Sivakow	13	0	5+7	0	1	0	0	0
34	DF	(Azerbaijan) AZE	Urfan Abbasov	29	1	25	1	3	0	1	0
44	DF	(Brazil) BRA	Rafael Santos	33	0	28	0	3	0	2	0
88	MF	(Azerbaijan) AZE	Mushfig Teymurov	5	0	4+1	0	0	0	0	0
90	FW	(Nigeria) NGR	Ekigho Ehiosun	32	6	17+12	6	2+1	0	0	0
Players away from Gabala on loan:
Players who appeared for Gabala no longer at the club:
1	GK	(Azerbaijan) AZE	Kamran Aghayev	17	0	15	0	0	0	2	0
6	DF	(Azerbaijan) AZE	Volodimir Levin	3	0	0+1	0	0	0	2	0
8	MF	(Azerbaijan) AZE	Nizami Hajiyev	2	0	0	0	0	0	2	0
8	MF	(Brazil) BRA	Marquinhos	13	1	10+2	1	1	0	0	0
11	FW	(Romania) ROU	Andrei Cristea	10	0	4+4	0	0	0	1+1	0
21	FW	(Portugal) POR	Yazalde	14	0	4+9	0	1	0	0	0
36	DF	(Azerbaijan) AZE	Elnur Allahverdiyev	1	0	0	0	0	0	1	0

=== Goal scorers ===
Place	Position	Nation	Number	Name	Premier League	Azerbaijan Cup	Europa League	Total
1	FW	(Azerbaijan)	14	Javid Huseynov	11	0	0	11
2	FW	(Senegal)	9	Victor Mendy	8	0	0	8
3	FW	(Nigeria)	90	Ekigho Ehiosun	6	0	0	6
4	FW	(Brazil)	10	Dodô	5	0	0	5
5	DF	(Azerbaijan)	15	Ruslan Abışov	4	0	0	4
5	MF	(Ukraine)	19	Oleksiy Gai	4	0	0	4
5	FW	(Azerbaijan)	27	Bakhtiyar Soltanov	2	2	0	4
8				Own goal	3	0	0	3
9	DF	(Slovakia)	26	Pavol Farkaš	1	1	0	2
10	MF	(Brazil)	8	Marquinhos	1	0	0	1
10	DF	(Azerbaijan)	34	Urfan Abbasov	1	0	0	1
				TOTALS	46	3	0	49

=== Disciplinary record ===
Number	Nation	Position	Name	Premier League		Azerbaijan Cup		Europa League		Total	
Number	Nation	Position	Name	Yellow card	Red card	Yellow card	Red card	Yellow card	Red card	Yellow card	Red card
4	(Azerbaijan)	MF	Elvin Jamalov	9	0	0	0	0	0	9	0
5	(Azerbaijan)	DF	Sadig Guliyev	1	0	0	0	0	0	1	0
6	(Azerbaijan)	MF	Rashad Sadiqov	2	0	0	0	0	0	2	0
7	(Azerbaijan)	DF	Ruslan Amirjanov	1	0	0	0	0	0	1	0
9	(Senegal)	FW	Victor Mendy	3	0	1	0	0	0	4	0
10	(Brazil)	FW	Dodô	2	0	1	0	0	0	3	0
12	(Romania)	DF	Alexandru Benga	4	1	0	0	0	0	4	1
14	(Azerbaijan)	FW	Javid Huseynov	7	0	1	0	0	0	8	0
15	(Azerbaijan)	DF	Ruslan Abışov	12	0	0	0	0	0	12	0
16	(Azerbaijan)	MF	Ruslan Tagizade	8	1	0	0	0	0	8	1
17	(Azerbaijan)	MF	Qismät Aliyev	1	0	0	0	0	0	1	0
18	(Ukraine)	FW	Ruslan Fomin	2	0	0	0	0	0	2	0
19	(Ukraine)	MF	Oleksiy Gai	2	0	0	0	0	0	2	0
20	(Brazil)	DF	Ricardinho	2	0	0	0	0	0	2	0
22	(Ukraine)	GK	Dmytro Bezotosnyi	0	1	0	0	0	0	0	1
25	(Romania)	MF	Adrian Ropotan	9	0	0	0	2	0	11	0
26	(Slovakia)	DF	Pavol Farkaš	4	0	0	0	0	0	4	0
27	(Azerbaijan)	FW	Bakhtiyar Soltanov	2	0	1	0	0	0	3	0
30	(Azerbaijan)	GK	Anar Nazirov	1	0	0	0	1	0	2	0
34	(Azerbaijan)	DF	Urfan Abbasov	3	0	1	0	1	0	5	0
44	(Brazil)	DF	Rafael Santos	4	0	1	0	0	0	5	0
88	(Azerbaijan)	MF	Mushfig Teymurov	1	0	0	0	0	0	1	0
90	(Nigeria)	FW	Ekigho Ehiosun	3	0	0	0	0	0	3	0
Players who left Gabala during the season:
1	(Azerbaijan)	GK	Kamran Aghayev	1	0	0	0	0	0	1	0
8	(Azerbaijan)	MF	Nizami Hajiyev	0	0	0	0	1	0	1	0
8	(Brazil)	MF	Marquinhos	1	0	0	0	0	0	1	0
11	(Romania)	FW	Andrei Cristea	1	0	0	0	0	0	1	0
			TOTALS	86	3	6	0	4	0	96	3

== Notes ==
- Qarabağ have played their home games at the Tofiq Bahramov Stadium since 1993 due to the ongoing situation in Quzanlı.
- Araz-Naxçıvan were excluded from the Azerbaijan Premier League on 17 November 2014, with all their results being annulled.
