= 2017–18 Gabala FC season =

Gabala
2017-18 season
- Chairman: Tale Heydarov
- Manager: Roman Hryhorchuk
- Stadium: Gabala City Stadium
- Premier League: 2nd
- Azerbaijan Cup: Runners-up
- Europa League: Third qualifying round vs Panathinaikos
- Top goalscorer: League: Bagaliy Dabo (13); All: Bagaliy Dabo (16)
- Highest home attendance: 11,000 vs Panathinaikos; 3 August 2017
- Lowest home attendance: 375 vs Kapaz; 29 September 2017
- Average home league attendance: 2,087; 5 May 2018
Home colours	Away colours

The 2017–18 season was Gabala FK's 13th season, and their 12th in the Azerbaijan Premier League, the top-flight of Azerbaijani football. Gabala finished the season in second place, 16 points behind champions Qarabağ. In the Azerbaijan Cup were runners-up for the second year in a row, losing to Keşla 1-0 in the final whilst they also reached the Third qualifying round of the Europa League before being knocked out by Panathinaikos.

== Transfers ==
=== In ===
Date	Position	Nationality	Name	From	Fee	Ref.
31 May 2017	MF	(Azerbaijan)	Ilgar Gurbanov	Qarabağ	Undisclosed	
5 June 2017	GK	(Azerbaijan)	Agil Mammadov	AZAL	Undisclosed	
5 June 2017	MF	(Azerbaijan)	Elvin Mammadov	Zira	Undisclosed	
15 June 2017	MF	(Spain)	Javi Hernández	Górnik Łęczna	Undisclosed	
23 June 2017	FW	(France)	Steeven Joseph-Monrose	Stade Brest	Undisclosed	
24 June 2017	DF	(Suriname)	Dion Malone	ADO Den Haag	Undisclosed	
7 July 2017	DF	(Netherlands)	Dave Bulthuis	1. FC Nürnberg	Undisclosed	
31 August 2017	MF	(Azerbaijan)	Alen Askerov	Novigrad	Undisclosed	
21 September 2017	FW	(Nigeria)	Ekigho Ehiosun	Gazişehir Gaziantep	Undisclosed	
30 December 2017	MF	(Azerbaijan)	Tamkin Khalilzade	Zira	Undisclosed	
25 January 2018	GK	(Azerbaijan)	Agil Mammadov	Neftchi Baku	Free	
28 March 2018	FW	(Azerbaijan)	Rauf Aliyev	Kukësi	Free	

=== Out ===
Date	Position	Nationality	Name	To	Fee	Ref.
1 July 2017	DF	(Azerbaijan)	Murad Musayev	Səbail	Undisclosed	
3 August 2017	DF	(Brazil)	Ricardinho	Oxford United	Undisclosed	
17 August 2017	DF	(Spain)	Javi Hernández	Cracovia	Undisclosed	
22 August 2017	GK	(Azerbaijan)	Dawid Pietrzkiewicz	Sandecja Nowy Sącz	Undisclosed	
1 September 2017	DF	(Azerbaijan)	Farid Nabiyev	Slavia Prague	Undisclosed	
10 January 2018	DF	(Netherlands)	Dave Bulthuis	Heerenveen	Undisclosed	
	GK	(Azerbaijan)	Suleyman Suleymanov	Sumgayit	Undisclosed	

=== Loans in ===
Date from	Position	Nationality	Name	From	Date to	Ref.
28 June 2017	MF	(Scotland)	Andy Halliday	Rangers	4 January 2018	
2 July 2017	FW	(Mali)	Famoussa Koné	Göztepe	Season Long	

=== Loans out ===
Date from	Position	Nationality	Name	To	Date to	Ref.
2 June 2017	FW	(Ukraine)	Ramil Hasanov	Sumgayit		
2 July 2017	DF	(Azerbaijan)	Yusif Nabiyev	Zira	3 January 2018	
12 August 2017	MF	(Azerbaijan)	Araz Abdullayev	Anorthosis	End of Season	
2 January 2018	FW	(Azerbaijan)	Ulvi Isgandarov	Sumgayit	End of Season	
5 January 2018	FW	(Ukraine)	Ramil Hasanov	Khazar Baku	End of Season	
6 January 2018	MF	(Azerbaijan)	Roman Huseynov	Kapaz	End of Season	
16 February 2018	FW	(Azerbaijan)	Rovlan Muradov	Slavia Prague	End of Season	

=== Released ===
Date	Position	Nationality	Name	Joined	Date
1 January 2018	GK	(Azerbaijan)	Agil Mammadov	Neftchi Baku	1 January 2018
1 January 2018	MF	(Azerbaijan)	Tellur Mutallimov	Zira	1 January 2018
1 January 2018	FW	(Nigeria)	Ekigho Ehiosun	Hapoel Acre	17 September 2018
31 May 2018	DF	(Ukraine)	Vitaliy Vernydub	Zorya Luhansk	19 June 2018
31 May 2018	MF	(Azerbaijan)	Elvin Mammadov	Sumgayit	11 June 2018
31 May 2018	MF	(Croatia)	Filip Ozobić	Qarabağ	2 June 2018
31 May 2018	FW	(Azerbaijan)	Ruslan Qurbanov	Sabail	11 June 2018
31 May 2018	FW	(France)	Bagaliy Dabo	Neftchi Baku	17 June 2018

=== Trial ===
Date From	Date To	Position	Nationality	Name	Last club	Ref.
November 2017		MF	(Guinea)	Abdul Kerim Konte		
November 2017		MF	(Colombia)	Kevin Pena		
January 2018		FW	(Brazil)	Kaique	Santos	

== Squad ==
As of match played 28 May 2018

No.	Name	Nationality	Position	Date of birth (age)	Signed from	Signed in	Contract ends	Apps.	Goals
Goalkeepers
22	Dmytro Bezotosnyi	(Ukraine)	GK	15 November 1983 (aged 34)	Chornomorets Odesa	2015		141	0
23	Agil Mammadov	(Azerbaijan)	GK	1 May 1989 (aged 29)	Neftchi Baku	2018	2018	5	0
35	Murad Popov	(Azerbaijan)	GK	5 March 1999 (aged 19)	Trainee	2016		0	0
Defenders
2	Sahil Mirzayev	(Azerbaijan)	DF	18 January 1997 (aged 21)	Trainee	2015		0	0
3	Vojislav Stanković	(Serbia)	DF	22 September 1987 (aged 30)	Inter Baku	2017	2019	112	2
5	Rasim Ramaldanov	(Azerbaijan)	DF	24 January 1986 (aged 32)	Kolkheti-1913 Poti	2017		18	0
15	Vitaliy Vernydub	(Ukraine)	DF	17 October 1987 (aged 30)	Zorya Luhansk	2015	2018	78	3
16	Dion Malone	(Suriname)	DF	13 February 1989 (aged 29)	ADO Den Haag	2017	2019	21	0
34	Urfan Abbasov	(Azerbaijan)	DF	14 October 1992 (aged 25)	Qarabağ	2011		188	2
74	Yusif Nabiyev	(Azerbaijan)	DF	3 September 1997 (aged 20)	Trainee	2015		4	0
Midfielders
4	Elvin Jamalov	(Azerbaijan)	MF	4 February 1995 (aged 23)	Trainee	2013		114	0
6	Elvin Mammadov	(Azerbaijan)	MF	18 July 1988 (aged 29)	Zira	2017	2018	15	2
7	Alen Askerov	(Azerbaijan)	MF	11 July 1996 (aged 21)	Novigrad	2017	2018	0	0
8	Qismət Alıyev	(Azerbaijan)	MF	24 October 1996 (aged 21)	Trainee	2014		43	0
11	Asif Mammadov	(Azerbaijan)	MF	5 August 1986 (aged 31)	Inter Baku	2015		100+	11
14	Javid Huseynov	(Azerbaijan)	MF	9 March 1988 (aged 30)	Baku	2016		89	20
16	Emin Zamanov	(Azerbaijan)	MF	26 December 1997 (aged 20)	Trainee	2015		0	0
18	Ilgar Gurbanov	(Azerbaijan)	MF	25 April 1986 (aged 32)	Qarabağ	2017	2019	20	1
19	Filip Ozobić	(Croatia)	MF	8 April 1991 (aged 27)	Slaven Belupo	2016	2018	74	25
26	Ülvi İbazadə	(Azerbaijan)	MF	26 August 1996 (aged 21)	Trainee	2016		1	0
29	Hajiagha Hajili	(Azerbaijan)	MF	30 January 1998 (aged 20)	Trainee	2016		4	0
32	Amin Seydiyev	(Azerbaijan)	MF	15 November 1998 (aged 19)	Trainee	2017		1	0
33	Tamkin Khalilzade	(Azerbaijan)	MF	6 August 1993 (aged 24)	Zira	2017	2020	15	0
Forwards
9	Bagaliy Dabo	(France)	ST	27 July 1988 (aged 29)	US Créteil	2016	2018	62	27
10	Ruslan Qurbanov	(Azerbaijan)	ST	12 September 1991 (aged 26)	Neftchi Baku	2016	2018	59	11
28	Steeven Joseph-Monrose	(France)	ST	20 July 1990 (aged 27)	Stade Brest	2017	2019	31	12
45	Famoussa Koné	(Mali)	ST	3 May 1994 (aged 24)	Göztepe	2017	2018	33	7
	Rauf Aliyev	(Azerbaijan)	ST	12 February 1989 (aged 29)	Kukësi	2018	2019	0	0
Left during the season
12	Andy Halliday	(Scotland)	MF	18 July 1988 (aged 29)	loan from Rangers	2017	2018	8	0
20	Javi Hernández	(Spain)	MF	6 June 1989 (aged 28)	Górnik Łęczna	2017	2018	1	0
21	Dave Bulthuis	(Netherlands)	DF	28 June 1990 (aged 27)	1. FC Nürnberg	2017	2020	8	0
88	Tellur Mutallimov	(Azerbaijan)	MF	8 April 1995 (aged 23)	Trainee	2014		30	5
90	Ekigho Ehiosun	(Nigeria)	ST	25 June 1990 (aged 27)	Gazişehir Gaziantep	2017	2018	39	6

=== Out on loan ===
Note: Flags indicate national team as defined under FIFA eligibility rules; some limited exceptions apply. Players may hold more than one non-FIFA nationality.

No.	Pos.	Nation	Player
—	DF	AZE	Bahlul Mustafazade (at Sumgayit)
—	MF	AZE	Araz Abdullayev (at Anorthosis)
—	MF	AZE	Ehtiram Shahverdiyev (at Sumgayit)
—	MF	AZE	Emin Zamanov (at Kapaz)

No.	Pos.	Nation	Player
—	FW	AZE	Roman Huseynov (at Sumgayit)
—	FW	AZE	Ulvi Isgandarov (at Kapaz)
—	FW	AZE	Rovlan Muradov (at Slavia Prague)
—	FW	UKR	Ramil Hasanov (at Khazar Baku)

== Friendlies ==
12 June 2017	TSV Fulpmes (Austria)	0 – 8	(Azerbaijan) Gabala	Austria
AZT (UTC+4)		Report	Dabo; Mutallimov; Gurbanov; Ozobić; Jamalov; Q.Alıyev; U.İbazadə

15 June 2017	Akhmat Grozny (Russia)	1 – 0	(Azerbaijan) Gabala	Jenbach, Austria
AZT (UTC+4)	Sadayev 49'	Report

18 June 2017 Stubai Cup	Admira Wacker Mödling (Austria)	1 – 0	(Azerbaijan) Gabala	Austria
18:00 AZT (UTC+4)		Report
Note: 45mins

18 June 2017 Stubai Cup	CSKA Sofia (Bulgaria)	2 – 0	(Azerbaijan) Gabala	Austria
AZT (UTC+4)	Nedyalkov 4'; Mercado 44'	Report
Note: 45mins

22 June 2017	Ludogorets Razgrad (Bulgaria)	2 – 0	(Azerbaijan) Gabala	Austria
AZT (UTC+4)	João Paulo 37'; Lukoki 73'	Report

30 June 2017	SV Grödig (Austria)	0 – 7	(Azerbaijan) Gabala	Salzburg, Austria
AZT (UTC+4)		Report	Joseph-Monrose 24'; Abbasov 37'; As.Mammadov 47', 56'; Hernández 48'; Abdullayev 58'; F.Nabiyev 75'

4 July 2017	Dynamo Kyiv (Ukraine)	2 – 1	(Azerbaijan) Gabala	Austria
AZT (UTC+4)	Khlyobas 13', 55'	Report	E.Mammadov 86'

8 July 2017	Utrecht (Netherlands)	0 – 1	(Azerbaijan) Gabala	Austria
18:00 AZT (UTC+4)		Report	Koné 64'

4 September 2017	Gabala	1 – 3	Sumgayit	Baku
17:45 AZT (UTC+4)	Halliday 45' (pen.)	Report	Yunanov 22'; Imamverdiyev 56', 70'	Stadium: Ismat Gayibov Stadium

11 November 2017	Gabala	0 – 1	Zira	Baku
15:00 AZT (UTC+4)		Report	Gadze 77'	Stadium: Baku Olympic Stadium

12 November 2017	Gabala	1 – 1	Səbail	Baku
AZT (UTC+4)	K.Penan 45'	Report	Popovici 70'	Stadium: Ismat Gayibov Stadium

10 January 2018	Gabala (Azerbaijan)	1 – 1	(Turkey) Akhisar Belediyespor	Belek, Turkey
AZT (UTC+4)	Serginho 17'	Report	Ozobić 57'	Stadium: Rixos Premium Hotel

14 January 2018	Gabala (Azerbaijan)	v	(Kazakhstan) Atyrau	Antalya, Turkey
AZT (UTC+4)

17 January 2018	Gabala (Azerbaijan)	0 – 1	(Switzerland) Zürich	Antalya, Turkey
16:30 AZT (UTC+4)		Report	Brunner 57'

24 January 2018	Gabala (Azerbaijan)	2 – 1	(North Macedonia) Rabotnički	Antalya, Turkey
AZT (UTC+4)	As.Mammadov 45'; Dabo 54'	Report	Serginho 39'

27 January 2018	Gabala (Azerbaijan)	3 – 3	(Russia) Arsenal Tula	Antalya, Turkey
18:00 AZT (UTC+4)	Ozobić 16'; Joseph-Monrose 32'; Vernydub 83'	Report	Berkhamov 5', 28', 44'

31 January 2018	Gabala (Azerbaijan)	1 – 3	(Czech Republic) Bohemians 1905	Antalya, Turkey
AZT (UTC+4)	Hajili 49'	Report	Luts 31'; J.Nečas 69'; Hašek 72'

3 February 2018	Gabala (Azerbaijan)	0 – 2	(North Macedonia) Shkëndija	Antalya, Turkey
AZT (UTC+4)		Report	Ibraimi 8'; Hasani 34' (pen.)

== Competitions ==
=== Azerbaijan Premier League ===
==== Results summary ====
Overall								Home						Away					
Pld	W	D	L	GF	GA	GD	Pts	W	D	L	GF	GA	GD	W	D	L	GF	GA	GD
28	14	7	7	42	25	+17	49	7	4	3	19	11	+8	7	3	4	23	14	+9

Last updated: 21 May 2018.
Source: See Results

==== Results ====
12 August 2017 1	Inter Baku	1 – 2	Gabala	Baku
20:00 AZT (UTC+4)	Seyidov (yellow card) 31'; Fardjad-Azad 71'; S.Zargarov (yellow card) 78'	Report	E.Mammadov 13' (yellow card) 61'; Ozobić 23' (pen.) (yellow card) 90+2'; Joseph-Monrose (yellow card) 41'	Stadium: Inter Arena; Attendance: 500; Referee: Omar Paşayev

20 August 2017 2	Gabala	1 – 0	Sumgayit	Qabala
20:00 AZT (UTC+4)	Mutallimov 40'; E.Mammadov (yellow card) 57'	Report	A.Salahli (yellow card) 2'; E.Shahverdiyev (yellow card) 77'	Stadium: Gabala City Stadium; Attendance: 2,500; Referee: Aliyar Aghayev

26 August 2017 3	Qarabağ	2 – 1	Gabala	Baku
20:30 AZT (UTC+4)	Sadygov (yellow card) 47'; Amirguliyev (yellow card) 52'; Madatov 63'; Míchel 73'; Ndlovu (yellow card) 88'	Report	Malone (yellow card) 51'; Joseph-Monrose 69'; Q.Alıyev (yellow card) 83'	Stadium: Azersun Arena; Attendance: 4,200; Referee: Fariz Yusifov

9 September 2017 4	Gabala	1 – 1	Zira	Qabala
20:30 AZT (UTC+4)	Stanković (yellow card) 37'; Abbasov (yellow card) 83'; J.Huseynov 90+1'; Vernydub (yellow card) 90+1'	Report	Matei (yellow card) 58'; V.Igbekoyi 74' (yellow card) 90+1'	Stadium: Gabala City Stadium; Attendance: 1,200; Referee: Omar Paşayev

17 September 2017 5	Sabail	1 – 3	Gabala	Baku
21:00 AZT (UTC+4)	E.Yagublu (yellow card) 32'; Nadirov 56'	Report	Dabo 42', 90+3'; Vernydub (yellow card) 57'; As.Mammadov 60'; Halliday (yellow card) 84'	Stadium: Bayil Stadium; Attendance: 200; Referee: Rauf Jabbarov

24 September 2017 6	Gabala	2 – 1	Neftchi Baku	Qabala
18:00 AZT (UTC+4)	Joseph-Monrose 4' (red card) 90'; Dabo 40'; Halliday (yellow card) 58'; J.Huseynov (yellow card) 65'	Report	Alasgarov 48'; Sadiqov (yellow card) 52'; Krivotsyuk (yellow card) 63'; Abışov (yellow card) 81'	Stadium: Gabala City Stadium; Attendance: 1,000; Referee: Farizx Yusifov

29 September 2017 7	Gabala	0 – 2	Kapaz	Qabala
18:30 AZT (UTC+4)	Qurbanov (yellow card) 47'; As.Mammadov (yellow card) 83'; Q.Alıyev (yellow card) 84'; E.Mammadov (yellow card) 90+2'	Report	K.Diniyev 48'; S.Rahimov (yellow card) 53'; I.Sadigov 56' (yellow card) 59'	Stadium: Gabala City Stadium; Attendance: 175; Referee: Ingilab Məmmədov

14 October 2017 8	Sumgayit	0 – 1	Gabala	Sumqayit
18:00 AZT (UTC+4)	Malikov (yellow card) 37'; B.Hasanalizade (yellow card) 54'	Report	Koné 29'; Halliday (yellow card) 43'; As.Mammadov (yellow card) 80'; Bezotosnyi (yellow card) 88'	Stadium: Kapital Bank Arena; Attendance: 1,300; Referee: Rauf Jabbarov

22 October 2017 9	Gabala	1 – 0	Qarabağ	Qabala
13:30 AZT (UTC+4)	As.Mammadov 8'; Jamalov (yellow card) 74'	Report	Agolli (yellow card) 16'; Sadygov (yellow card) 35'; Rzeźniczak (yellow card) 36'	Stadium: Gabala City Stadium; Attendance: 3,000; Referee: Omar Paşayev

28 October 2017 10	Zira	1 – 2	Gabala	Zirə
17:00 AZT (UTC+4)	Đurić 19' (pen.) (yellow card) 43'; Tounkara 38' (yellow card) 72'; K.Bayramov (yellow card) 44'; Gadze (yellow card) 63'; Boum (yellow card) 79'; Naghiyev (yellow card) 81'; Khalilzade (yellow card) 90+3'	Report	Abbasov (yellow card) 33'; Stanković (yellow card) 35'; J.Huseynov (red card); Ehiosun (yellow card) 51'; Koné 72'	Stadium: Zira Olympic Sport Complex Stadium; Attendance: 1,150; Referee: Yusifov

4 November 2017 11	Gabala	3 – 1	Sabail	Qabala
16:00 AZT (UTC+4)	Koné 16'; Dabo 29', 83'	Report	K.Gurbanov (yellow card) 56'; E.Yagublu 88' (yellow card) 90+2'	Stadium: Gabala City Stadium; Attendance: 1,500; Referee: Rauf Jabbarov

19 November 2017 12	Neftchi Baku	2 – 3	Gabala	Baku
17:00 AZT (UTC+4)	Makhmudov 19'; Petrov 48'; Krivotsyuk (yellow card) 55'	Report	Dabo 22'; Qurbanov 56' (pen.); Jamalov (yellow card) 61'; Joseph-Monrose 80'	Stadium: Bakcell Arena; Attendance: 2,500; Referee: Aliyar Aghayev

25 November 2017 13	Kapaz	1 – 6	Gabala	Ganja
14:30 AZT (UTC+4)	I.Sadigov (yellow card) 27'; N.Mammadov (yellow card) 35'; K.Diniyev 56' (pen.)	Report	Dabo 1', 54'; Joseph-Monrose 14'; Koné (yellow card) 31' (goal) 40', 78'; Abbasov 58'; Qurbanov 65'	Stadium: Ganja City Stadium; Attendance: 8,500; Referee: Omar Paşayev

3 December 2017 14	Gabala	3 – 0	Keşla	Qabala
16:00 AZT (UTC+4)	Dabo 24'; Ozobić 51', 56'; Ehiosun (yellow card) 88'	Report	Fardjad-Azad (yellow card) 30'	Stadium: Gabala City Stadium; Attendance: 300; Referee: Ingilab Məmmədov

10 February 2018 15	Qarabağ	0 – 0	Gabala	Baku
19:00 AZT (UTC+4)	Diniyev (yellow card) 71'; Rzeźniczak (yellow card) 72'; Amirguliyev (yellow card) 78'	Report	Q.Alıyev (yellow card) 17'; Stanković (yellow card) 73'	Stadium: Azersun Arena; Attendance: 1,500; Referee: Ingilab Məmmədov

17 February 2018 16	Gabala	2 – 1	Zira	Qabala
15:00 AZT (UTC+4)	Qurbanov (yellow card) 43'; Q.Alıyev (yellow card) 46'; Joseph-Monrose 56'; Dabo 64'	Report	Dedov (yellow card) 32' (goal) 39'; Urdinov (yellow card) 43'; I.Muradov (yellow card) 51'; Đurić (yellow card) 65'; Mustafayev (yellow card) 66'	Stadium: Gabala City Stadium; Attendance: 1,400; Referee: Rauf Jabbarov

24 February 2018 17	Sabail	2 – 1	Gabala	Baku
16:00 AZT (UTC+4)	Vernydub 25' (o.g.); F.Muradbayli 57'; E.Yagublu (yellow card) 88'	Report	Khalilzade (yellow card) 31'; As.Mammadov (yellow card) 57'; Dabo 68'; Hajili (yellow card) 71'	Stadium: Bayil Stadium; Attendance: 500; Referee: Aliyar Aghayev

4 March 2018 18	Gabala	1 – 2	Neftchi Baku	Qabala
15:30 AZT (UTC+4)	E.Mammadov 34'; Dabo (yellow card) 38'; Jamalov (yellow card) 56'; Nabiyev (red card) 83'; Stanković (yellow card) 88'	Report	Hajiyev (yellow card) 19'; M.Abbasov 59'; Herrera 73'; Mahmudov (yellow card) 76'; Petrov (yellow card) 87'; Krivotsyuk (yellow card) 90+1'	Stadium: Gabala City Stadium; Attendance: 3,000; Referee: Rauf Jabbarov

9 March 2018 19	Kapaz	0 – 1	Gabala	Ganja
15:00 AZT (UTC+4)	Jalilov (yellow card) 21'	Report	Hajili (yellow card) 19'; Qurbanov (yellow card) 30'; Ozobić 66'	Stadium: Ganja City Stadium; Attendance: 5,000; Referee: Ravan Hamzazade

13 March 2018 20	Keşla	1 – 1	Gabala	Baku
15:30 AZT (UTC+4)	F.Bayramov (yellow card) 38'; Stanković 59' (o.g.); Fardjad-Azad (yellow card) 75'	Report	Dabo 32'; Q.Alıyev (yellow card) 40'; Jamalov (yellow card) 59'; Malone (yellow card) 81'	Stadium: Inter Arena; Attendance: 500; Referee: Omar Paşayev

2 April 2018 21	Gabala	1 – 1	Sumgayit	Qabala
17:00 AZT (UTC+4)	Jamalov (yellow card) 26'; Joseph-Monrose 55' (yellow card) 80'; Stanković (yellow card) 67'	Report	V.Beybalayev (yellow card) 40'; N.Gurbanov 83'	Stadium: Gabala City Stadium; Attendance: 550; Referee: Ingilab Məmmədov

8 April 2018 22	Zira	1 – 1	Gabala	Zirə
16:30 AZT (UTC+4)	Đurić 53' (pen.); Williams (yellow card) 56'	Report	Joseph-Monrose 78'; Khalilzade (yellow card) 90+3'	Stadium: Zira Olympic Sport Complex Stadium; Attendance: 1,000; Referee: Ravan Həmzəzadə

15 April 2018 23	Gabala	1 – 1	Sabail	Qabala
17:00 AZT (UTC+4)	Ramaldanov (yellow card) 27'; Jamalov (yellow card) 61'; Koné 82' (yellow card) 84'; Q.Alıyev (yellow card) 90+4'	Report	T.Tsetskhladze (yellow card) 20'; F.Muradbayli 55'	Stadium: Gabala City Stadium; Attendance: 250; Referee: Aliyar Aghayev

22 April 2018 24	Neftchi Baku	1 – 0	Gabala	Baku
19:00 AZT (UTC+4)	Abışov 4' (yellow card) 34'; Mahmudov (yellow card) 19' (yellow-red card) 63'; Petrov (yellow card) 32'; Alaskarov (yellow card) 41'	Report	Joseph-Monrose (yellow card) 21'; Ozobić (yellow card) 90'	Stadium: Bakcell Arena; Attendance: 1,500; Referee: Ingilab Məmmədov

28 April 2018 25	Gabala	3 – 0	Kapaz	Qabala
18:00 AZT (UTC+4)	Q.Alıyev (yellow card) 8'; Abbasov (yellow card) 13'; Ozobić 31'; Joseph-Monrose 39'; Huseynov 45+1'; Koné (yellow card) 71'	Report	Mandzhgaladze (yellow card) 62'; R.Huseynov (yellow card) 70'	Stadium: Gabala City Stadium; Attendance: 800; Referee: Aliyar Aghayev

5 May 2018 26	Gabala	1 – 1	Keşla	Qabala
19:00 AZT (UTC+4)	Joseph-Monrose 30'; Ramaldanov (yellow card) 43'	Report	S.Alkhasov 10'; A.Mammadli (yellow card) 24'; Javadov (yellow card) 61'; F.Bayramov (yellow card) 67'; Guliyev (yellow card) 83'	Stadium: Gabala City Stadium; Attendance: 800; Referee: Ravan Həmzəzadə

12 May 2018 27	Sumgayit	0 – 2	Gabala	Sumqayit
19:00 AZT (UTC+4)	Hüseynov (yellow card) 52'; N.Gurbanov (yellow card) 80'	Report	Dabo 37'; Huseynov 88'	Stadium: Kapital Bank Arena; Attendance: 1,300; Referee: Aliyar Aghayev

21 May 2018 28	Gabala	0 – 1	Qarabağ	Baku
19:00 AZT (UTC+4)	Huseynov (red card) 45+2'; Ozobić (yellow card) 74'; Khalilzade (yellow card) 85'	Report	Ramazanov (yellow card) 15'; Quintana 22' (pen.); Sadygov (yellow card) 50'	Stadium: Azersun Arena; Attendance: 3,000; Referee: Raad Ahmədov
Note: Match moved to the Azersun Arena in Baku.

==== League table ====
Pos	Team	Pld	W	D	L	GF	GA	GD	Pts	Qualification or relegation
1	Qarabağ (C)	28	20	5	3	37	13	+24	65	Qualification for the Champions League first qualifying round
2	Gabala	28	14	7	7	43	26	+17	49	Qualification for the Europa League first qualifying round
3	Neftçi Baku	28	14	4	10	39	28	+11	46	Qualification for the Europa League first qualifying round
4	Zira	28	12	8	8	36	30	+6	44	
5	Sumgayit	28	11	7	10	34	33	+1	40	

Source: UEFA, Soccerway
Rules for classification: 1) Points; 2) Head-to-head points; 3) Head-to-head goal difference; 4) Head-to-head goals scored; 5) Head-to-head away goals scored (only if two teams); 6) Goal difference; 7) Goals scored.
(C) Champions

=== Azerbaijan Cup ===
29 November 2017 Second Round	Gabala	8 – 0	Mil-Muğan	Qabala
14:00 AZT (UTC+4)	Huseynov 30' (pen.); Qurbanov 42'; Ozobić 45+1', 58', 84'; U.Iskandarov 52'; Hajili (yellow card) 64' (goal) 85'; Ehiosun 73'	Report	J.Hasanov (yellow card) 29'; A.Babazadeh (yellow card) 45'; S.Babayev (yellow card) 55' (yellow-red card) 83'; V.Mehraliyev (yellow card) 75'; E.Mammadov (yellow card) 77'	Stadium: Gabala City Stadium; Attendance: 400; Referee: Ziya Nasirov

11 December 2017 Quarterfinal 1st leg	Gabala	1 – 0	Səbail	Qabala
16:00 AZT (UTC+4)	Joseph-Monrose 59'; J.Huseynov (penalty missed) 76'; Stanković (yellow card) 90+3'	Report		Stadium: Gabala City Stadium; Attendance: 400; Referee: Ravan Hamzazade

15 December 2017 Quarterfinal 2nd leg	Səbail	2 – 4 (2 – 5 agg.)	Gabala	Baku
16:00 AZT (UTC+4)	Popovici 16'; Nadirov (yellow card) 37'; Tagaýew 78'	Report	Ozobić 22'; Qurbanov (yellow card) 24' (goal) 44'; Koné 56' (yellow card) 59'; Dabo 75'; Abbasov (yellow card) 77'	Stadium: Bayil Arena; Attendance: 250; Referee: Ingilab Mammadov

12 April 2018 Semifinal 1st leg	Gabala	1 – 2	Neftchi Baku	Qabala
18:00 AZT (UTC+4)	Ozobić (yellow card) 68'; Q.Alıyev (yellow card) 88'; Joseph-Monrose 90+1'	Report	Gómez 29'; Alaskarov 45' (yellow card) 86'; R.Azizli (yellow card) 90+3'	Stadium: Gabala City Stadium; Attendance: 2,800; Referee: Ingilab Məmmədov

18 April 2018 Semifinal 2nd leg	Neftchi Baku	1 – 3 (3 – 4 agg.)	Gabala	Baku
20:00 AZT (UTC+4)	Mustivar 9'; Meza (yellow card) 46'; Abışov (yellow card) 59'; Herrera (yellow card) 84'	Report	Dabo 20', 30'; Abbasov (yellow card) 38'; Joseph-Monrose (yellow card) 41'; Qurbanov (yellow card) 45'; Huseynov 60' (pen.); Ramaldanov (yellow card) 88'	Stadium: Bakcell Arena; Attendance: 6,000; Referee: Rauf Jabbarov

==== Final ====
27 May 2018	Gabala	0 – 1	Keşla	Qabala
20:00 AZT (UTC+4)	Guliyev (yellow card) 7'; Sohna (yellow card) 17'; Fardjad-Azad 71' (yellow card) 90+5'; O.Sadigli (yellow card) 88'; Aghayev (yellow card) 90+1'	Report	Joseph-Monrose (yellow card) 4'; Koné (yellow card) 77'; Gurbanov (red card) 88'	Stadium: Gabala City Stadium; Attendance: 4,500; Referee: Rauf Jabbarov

=== UEFA Europa League ===
==== Qualifying rounds ====
13 July 2017 Second qualifying round 1st leg	Gabala (Azerbaijan)	1 – 1	(Poland) Jagiellonia Białystok	Baku (Note: Gabala will play their home match at Bakcell Arena, Baku, instead of their regular stadium City Stadium, Qabala.), Azerbaijan
21:00 AZT (UTC+4)	Halliday (yellow card) 17'; E.Mammadov (yellow card) 27'; Joseph-Monrose 48'; Huseynov (yellow card) 56'; Stanković (yellow card) 88'	Report	Romanchuk 15'; Góralski (yellow card) 18'; Burliga 44'	Stadium: Bakcell Arena; Attendance: 6,500; Referee: Marco Fritz (Germany)

20 July 2017 Second qualifying round 2nd leg	Jagiellonia Białystok (Poland)	0 – 2 (1 – 3 agg.)	(Azerbaijan) Gabala	Białystok, Poland
21:30 AZT (UTC+4)	Guilherme (yellow card) 21'	Report	Gurbanov 18'; Huseynov (yellow card) 83'; Ozobić 89'	Stadium: Białystok City Stadium; Attendance: 13,326; Referee: Sebastian Colţescu (Romania)

27 July 2017 Third qualifying round 1st leg	Panathinaikos (Greece)	1 – 0	(Azerbaijan) Gabala	Athens, Greece
22:30 AZT (UTC+4)	Molins 37' (pen.)	Report	Vernydub (yellow card) 42'	Stadium: Leoforos Alexandras Stadium; Attendance: 11,237; Referee: Juan Martínez Munuera (Spain)

3 August 2017 Third qualifying round 2nd leg	Gabala (Azerbaijan)	1 – 2 (1 – 3 agg.)	(Greece) Panathinaikos	Baku, Azerbaijan
21:00 AZT (UTC+4)	Malone (yellow card) 20'; Moledo 48' (o.g.)	Report	Lod (yellow card) 51' (goal) 63'; Cabezas 66'	Stadium: Bakcell Arena; Attendance: 11,000; Referee: Craig Pawson (England)

== Squad statistics ==
As of Match played 28 May 2018

=== Appearances and goals ===
No.	Pos	Nat	Player	Total		Premier League		Azerbaijan Cup		Europa League	
No.	Pos	Nat	Player	Apps	Goals	Apps	Goals	Apps	Goals	Apps	Goals
3	DF	(Serbia) SRB	Vojislav Stanković	31	0	20+1	0	6	0	4	0
4	MF	(Azerbaijan) AZE	Elvin Jamalov	21	0	14+4	0	0+2	0	0+1	0
5	DF	(Azerbaijan) AZE	Rasim Ramaldanov	11	0	8+1	0	1+1	0	0	0
6	MF	(Azerbaijan) AZE	Elvin Mammadov	16	2	6+5	2	0+1	0	1+3	0
8	MF	(Azerbaijan) AZE	Qismət Alıyev	29	0	22+2	0	5	0	0	0
9	FW	(France) FRA	Bagaliy Dabo	33	16	24+3	13	4	3	2	0
10	MF	(Azerbaijan) AZE	Ruslan Qurbanov	29	4	14+10	2	4+1	2	0	0
11	MF	(Azerbaijan) AZE	Asif Mammadov	29	2	13+9	2	3+1	0	0+3	0
14	FW	(Azerbaijan) AZE	Javid Huseynov	28	5	18	3	6	2	4	0
15	DF	(Ukraine) UKR	Vitaliy Vernydub	25	0	20	0	1	0	4	0
16	DF	(Suriname) SUR	Dion Malone	21	0	13+5	0	0	0	3	0
18	MF	(Azerbaijan) AZE	Ilgar Gurbanov	20	1	8+3	0	3+2	0	4	1
19	MF	(Croatia) CRO	Filip Ozobić	29	10	15+4	5	5+1	4	4	1
22	GK	(Ukraine) UKR	Dmytro Bezotosnyi	34	0	26	0	4	0	4	0
23	GK	(Azerbaijan) AZE	Agil Mammadov	5	0	2+1	0	2	0	0	0
28	FW	(France) FRA	Steeven Joseph-Monrose	31	12	21+1	9	5	2	4	1
29	MF	(Azerbaijan) AZE	Hajiagha Hajili	4	1	2+1	0	1	1	0	0
32	MF	(Azerbaijan) AZE	Amin Seydiyev	1	0	0	0	0+1	0	0	0
33	MF	(Azerbaijan) AZE	Tamkin Khalilzade	15	0	7+5	0	3	0	0	0
34	DF	(Azerbaijan) AZE	Urfan Abbasov	31	0	25	0	5	0	1	0
45	FW	(Mali) MLI	Famoussa Koné	33	7	13+10	6	6	1	1+3	0
74	DF	(Azerbaijan) AZE	Yusif Nabiyev	4	0	2+1	0	0+1	0	0	0
Players away from Gabala on loan:
17	FW	(Azerbaijan) AZE	Roman Huseynov	5	0	2+2	0	0+1	0	0	0
70	FW	(Azerbaijan) AZE	Ulvi Isgandarov	1	1	0	0	0+1	1	0	0
Players who left Gabala during the season:
12	MF	(Scotland) SCO	Andy Halliday	8	0	3	0	1	0	4	0
20	MF	(Spain) ESP	Javi Hernández	1	0	0	0	0	0	1	0
21	DF	(Netherlands) NED	Dave Bulthuis	8	0	2+2	0	0	0	3+1	0
88	MF	(Azerbaijan) AZE	Tellur Mutallimov	8	1	5+2	1	0+1	0	0	0
90	FW	(Nigeria) NGR	Ekigho Ehiosun	7	1	2+4	0	1	1	0	0

=== Goal scorers ===
Place	Position	Nation	Number	Name	Premier League	Azerbaijan Cup	Europa League	Total
1	FW	(France)	9	Bagaliy Dabo	13	3	0	16
2	FW	(France)	28	Steeven Joseph-Monrose	9	2	1	12
3	MF	(Croatia)	19	Filip Ozobić	5	4	1	10
4	FW	(Mali)	45	Famoussa Koné	6	1	0	7
5	MF	(Azerbaijan)	14	Javid Huseynov	3	2	0	5
6	FW	(Azerbaijan)	10	Ruslan Qurbanov	2	2	0	4
7	MF	(Azerbaijan)	11	Asif Mammadov	2	0	0	2
7	MF	(Azerbaijan)	6	Elvin Mammadov	2	0	0	2
9	MF	(Azerbaijan)	88	Tellur Mutallimov	1	0	0	1
9	FW	(Azerbaijan)	70	Ulvi Isgandarov	0	1	0	1
9	FW	(Nigeria)	90	Ekigho Ehiosun	0	1	0	1
9	MF	(Azerbaijan)	29	Hajiagha Hajili	0	1	0	1
9	MF	(Azerbaijan)	18	Ilgar Gurbanov	0	0	1	1
9				Own goal	0	0	1	1
				TOTALS	43	17	4	64

=== Disciplinary record ===
Number	Nation	Position	Name	Premier League		Azerbaijan Cup		Europa League		Total	
Number	Nation	Position	Name	Yellow card	Red card	Yellow card	Red card	Yellow card	Red card	Yellow card	Red card
3	(Serbia)	DF	Vojislav Stanković	5	0	1	0	1	0	7	0
4	(Azerbaijan)	MF	Elvin Jamalov	6	0	0	0	0	0	6	0
5	(Azerbaijan)	DF	Rasim Ramaldanov	2	0	1	0	0	0	3	0
6	(Azerbaijan)	MF	Elvin Mammadov	3	0	0	0	1	0	4	0
8	(Azerbaijan)	MF	Qismət Alıyev	7	0	1	0	0	0	8	0
9	(France)	FW	Bagaliy Dabo	1	0	0	0	0	0	1	0
10	(Azerbaijan)	FW	Ruslan Qurbanov	3	0	2	0	0	0	5	0
11	(Azerbaijan)	MF	Asif Mammadov	3	0	0	0	0	0	3	0
14	(Azerbaijan)	MF	Javid Huseynov	1	2	0	0	2	0	3	2
15	(Ukraine)	DF	Vitaliy Vernydub	2	0	0	0	1	0	3	0
16	(Suriname)	DF	Dion Malone	2	0	0	0	1	0	3	0
18	(Azerbaijan)	MF	Ilgar Gurbanov	0	0	0	1	0	0	0	1
19	(Croatia)	MF	Filip Ozobić	3	0	1	0	0	0	4	0
22	(Ukraine)	GK	Dmytro Bezotosnyi	1	0	0	0	0	0	1	0
28	(France)	FW	Steeven Joseph-Monrose	3	1	2	0	0	0	5	1
29	(Azerbaijan)	MF	Hajiagha Hajili	2	0	1	0	0	0	3	0
33	(Azerbaijan)	MF	Tamkin Khalilzade	3	0	0	0	0	0	3	0
34	(Azerbaijan)	DF	Urfan Abbasov	4	0	2	0	0	0	6	0
45	(Mali)	FW	Famoussa Koné	3	0	2	0	0	0	5	0
74	(Azerbaijan)	DF	Yusif Nabiyev	0	1	0	0	0	0	0	1
Players who left Gabala during the season:
12	(Scotland)	MF	Andy Halliday	3	0	0	0	1	0	4	0
90	(Nigeria)	FW	Ekigho Ehiosun	2	0	0	0	0	0	2	0
			TOTALS	59	4	13	1	7	0	79	5
