= Andrei Cristea =

Romanian footballer (born 1984)

Personal information
- Date of birth: 15 May 1984 (age 42)
- Place of birth: Bacău, Romania
- Height: 1.79 m (5 ft 10 in)
- Position: Striker

Youth career
- 1994–1999: LPS Bacău
- 1999–2002: FCM Bacău

Senior career*
Years	Team	Apps	(Gls)
2002–2004	FCM Bacău	35	(7)
2004–2006	Steaua București	52	(10)
2006–2008	Politehnica Timișoara	35	(6)
2008	→ Politehnica Iași (loan)	13	(6)
2008–2010	Dinamo București	48	(22)
2009	→ Politehnica Iași (loan)	15	(7)
2011–2012	Karlsruher SC	11	(6)
2012–2013	Dinamo București	19	(1)
2013–2014	FC Brașov	29	(8)
2014–2015	Gabala	9	(0)
2015	Salernitana	8	(2)
2015–2016	Martina Franca	16	(3)
2016–2019	Politehnica Iași	103	(33)
2019	Universitatea Craiova	10	(1)
2019–2021	Politehnica Iași	49	(13)
2021–2022	Mioveni	13	(0)
Total		465	(125)

International career
2003–2006	Romania U21	14	(0)
2003–2010	Romania	10	(0)

Managerial career
- 2021: Politehnica Iași (player/coach)
- 2022–2023: ACS FC Dinamo București
- 2023: Înainte Modelu
- 2023–2025: Popești-Leordeni
- 2025–2026: Concordia Chiajna
- * Club domestic league appearances and goals

Andrei Cristea (Romanian pronunciation: [anˈdrej ˈkriste̯a]; born 15 May 1984) is a Romanian professional football manager and former player.

Deployed as a forward, Cristea was known for his pace and range of passing rather than his goalscoring abilities, and represented the Romania national team from 2003 to 2010.

== Club career ==
=== Youth career ===
Cristea was born on 15 May 1984 in Bacău, Romania. He grew up supporting Selena Bacău, where he particularly admired striker Daniel Scînteie. He was also deeply impressed by Romania's performance in the 1994 World Cup, developing a strong admiration for Ilie Dumitrescu and Florin Răducioiu. Cristea began playing junior-level football at LPS Bacău when he was 10. In 1999, he joined the junior center of FCM Bacău.

=== FCM Bacău ===
Cristea made his Divizia A debut on 1 June 2002, when coach Gheorghe Poenaru sent him in the 89th minute to replace Cătălin Cursaru in FCM Bacău's 2–0 victory against Gloria Bistrița. He scored his first goal in the competition on 7 December 2002 in a 4–0 win over FC Brașov. On 20 March 2004, he netted a hat-trick in a 4–1 victory over Universitatea Craiova.

=== Steaua București ===
In the summer of 2004, Cristea was transferred from FCM Bacău to Steaua București for a fee estimated by the press to be between $800,000 and $1 million. He helped the team win the 2004–05 title under coaches Walter Zenga and Dumitru Dumitriu by contributing with seven goals in 28 league appearances, including scoring in a 1–0 away win over rivals Dinamo București. In the last round of the season, he scored a goal in the 2–1 home victory against Politehnica Timișoara which mathematically secured the title. In the same season, he played eight games in the UEFA Cup and scored a brace to help Steaua eliminate title holders Valencia in the campaign, reaching the round of 16 where the journey ended in favor of Villarreal.

Cristea started the 2005–06 season by entering the field in the 60th minute to replace Victoraș Iacob in the 3–2 loss to Dinamo in the Supercupa României. Throughout the season, Cristea scored three goals in 24 league matches under coaches Oleh Protasov and Cosmin Olăroiu to help Steaua win another championship. He also made 10 appearances in the UEFA Cup campaign, helping his side get past rivals Rapid București in the quarter-finals, before they were defeated by Middlesbrough in the semi-finals.

=== Politehnica Timișoara and Politehnica Iași ===
In 2006, Cristea moved to fellow Liga I club Politehnica Timișoara in a swap deal that saw Gigel Coman move to Steaua, with Steaua receiving an additional €200,000. He helped the team reach the Cupa României final, where coach Valentin Velcea sent him in the 55th minute to replace Mansour Gueye in the 2–0 loss to Rapid.

For the second part of the 2007–08 season, Cristea was loaned to Politehnica Iași, where he scored six goals to help the team avoid relegation.

=== Dinamo București and Politehnica Iași ===
On 9 May 2008, Cristea signed a five-year contract with Dinamo București for a fee estimated by the press at €500,000 to €600,000. Cristea wrote his name into Dinamo's history by scoring a goal in a 1–0 victory against Farul Constanța that secured the team's 1,000th victory in the domestic championship. He went again on loan to Politehnica Iași in the winter transfer window of the 2008–09 season, during which he helped the team avoid relegation by scoring seven times.

Cristea returned to Dinamo and became the top-scorer of the 2009–10 season by netting 16 goals, including one goal in a 2–0 victory in the derby against Steaua. He helped the club achieve what was dubbed "The wonder from Liberec" by opening the scoring in the 3–0 away game win against Slovan Liberec to force a penalty shoot-out after losing the first leg by the same score, ultimately qualifying for the 2009–10 Europa League group stage. His performance in the match earned him a grade 10 from the Gazeta Sporturilor newspaper.

=== Karlsruhe ===
On 16 January 2011, Karlsruher SC signed Cristea in an attempt to avoid relegation, paying Dinamo a €675,000 transfer fee. He made his 2. Bundesliga debut on 22 January, when coach Uwe Rapolder sent him at halftime in a 4–2 away loss to Alemannia Aachen. On 13 February, Cristea scored two goals in a 6–2 loss to Hertha BSC. On 27 February, he scored in a 4–1 loss to Ingolstadt 04. Subsequently, Cristea opened the scoring in a 3–1 victory against MSV Duisburg. In the last round of the season, he scored a brace in the 3–2 win against Union Berlin, which helped the team earn the points that mathematically saved Karlsruhe from relegation. In the next season, Cristea did not play a single match due to a knee injury, and Karlsruhe suffered relegation to the third league.

=== Dinamo and FC Brașov ===
Initially, Cristea wanted to stay in Germany, where he had offers from Ingolstadt 04 and Energie Cottbus, but Dinamo approached him and he agreed to return to Bucharest, where he had the chance to work again with coach Dario Bonetti. During this second spell, Cristea scored a single league goal in a 2–0 victory against Gaz Metan Mediaș.

Cristea signed a contract with FC Brașov in August 2013. His first goal was the decisive one in the 2–1 win over ACS Poli Timișoara. He scored eight times until the end of the 2013–14 season, including two goals in 1–0 wins over ACS Poli and Ceahlăul Piatra Neamț, and one goal in a 2–0 victory over his former club Dinamo. In the last round of the season, Cristea scored the equalizer in the 1–1 draw against Gaz Metan Mediaș, which helped his side earn the point that saved them from relegation.

=== Gabala, Salernitana and Martina Franca ===
On 22 June 2014, Cristea signed a one-year contract with Azerbaijan Premier League side Gabala, being brought there alongside Adrian Ropotan and Alexandru Benga by coach Dorinel Munteanu. Half a year later, Cristea had his contract with Gabala terminated. Following his release, he signed with Lega Pro side Salernitana until the end of the season. He helped the club achieve promotion to Serie B at the end of the 2014–15 season. However, he stayed in the third league, joining Martina Franca.

=== Politehnica Iași, "U" Craiova and Mioveni ===
In February 2016, Cristea returned to Romania to join his former team, Liga I club Politehnica Iași. He scored seven goals in 17 games in the second half of the 2015–16 Liga I and helped Politehnica qualify for the Europa League for the first time in their history. In their first European match, he opened the scoring in the 2–2 draw against Hajduk Split in the first leg of the 2016–17 Europa League second qualifying round. However, they failed to advance further in the competition as they were defeated 2–1 by Hajduk in the second leg. On 14 December 2018, in a 3–0 win against Concordia Chiajna, Cristea scored a brace and reached 100 goals in Liga I.

In January 2019, Cristea was transferred to Universitatea Craiova, which paid €100,000 to Politehnica Iași and sent Florin Gardoș and Andrei Burlacu to the latter club on loan. However, he was unsuccessful during his spell, scoring only one goal in a 2–0 win over CFR Cluj and returning after half a year to Politehnica Iași.

On 27 September 2020, Cristea scored a hat-trick and provided an assist to Juan Pablo Passaglia's goal in Politehnica's 5–2 league win over FCSB. However, the season was unsuccessful, as Politehnica suffered relegation to Liga II. Subsequently, Cristea joined newly promoted club Mioveni. After making 13 goalless appearances during the 2021–22 season, he terminated his contract with Mioveni in February 2022. One month later, Cristea announced his retirement, earning throughout his career a total of 421 matches with 114 goals and 46 assists in Liga I.

== International career ==
Cristea played 10 matches for Romania, making his debut on 11 October 2003, when coach Anghel Iordănescu sent him in the 82nd minute to replace Dorinel Munteanu in a 1–1 friendly draw against Japan. Subsequently, he played in a loss to the Netherlands and a win against Macedonia during the 2006 World Cup qualifiers. He made another two appearances in the 2010 World Cup qualifiers in a loss to Serbia and a victory against Faroe Islands. His last appearance for the national team took place on 2 June 2010 in a 1–0 friendly loss to Macedonia.

== Managerial career ==
In January 2021, after the dismissal of Daniel Pancu, Cristea was named head coach of Liga I club Politehnica Iași, while still an active player. He led the team in four matches which were all losses, and he was replaced by Nicolò Napoli. During the 2022–23 Liga IV season, he led ACS FC Dinamo București, failing to help the team gain promotion to Liga III. Subsequently, in June 2023, he signed with Înainte Modelu, but left two months later. From 2023 to 2025, Cristea worked for Popești-Leordeni. During his tenure, the team fought to earn promotion to Liga II for two consecutive seasons, though they were unsuccessful each time. In September 2025, Cristea was appointed as coach of Liga II side Concordia Chiajna, leaving the team at the end of the 2025–26 season.

== Personal life ==
On 29 March 2006, Cristea was decorated by the President of Romania, Traian Băsescu, with the Ordinul "Meritul Sportiv" (Order of "Sporting Merit"), Class II, for his contribution to reaching the 2005–06 UEFA Cup quarter-finals with Steaua București.

== Career statistics ==
=== Club ===
Appearances and goals by club, season and competition
Club	Season	League			National cup (Note: Includes Cupa României)		Europe		Other		Total	
Club	Season	Division	Apps	Goals	Apps	Goals	Apps	Goals	Apps	Goals	Apps	Goals
FCM Bacău	2001–02	Divizia A	1	0	0	0	—		—		1	0
FCM Bacău	2002–03	Divizia A	11	1	1	0	—		—		12	1
FCM Bacău	2003–04	Divizia A	23	6	0	0	—		—		23	6
FCM Bacău	Total		35	7	1	0	—		—		36	7
Steaua București	2004–05	Divizia A	28	7	1	0	8 (Note: Appearances in UEFA Cup)	2	—		37	9
Steaua București	2005–06	Divizia A	24	3	1	0	12 (Note: Two appearances in UEFA Champions League, ten appearances in UEFA Cup)	0	1 (Note: Appearance in Supercupa României)	0	38	3
Steaua București	Total		52	10	2	0	20	2	1	0	75	12
Politehnica Timișoara	2006–07	Liga I	28	6	4	2	—		—		32	8
Politehnica Timișoara	2007–08	Liga I	7	0	2	0	—		—		9	0
Politehnica Timișoara	Total		35	6	6	2	—		—		41	8
Politehnica Iași (loan)	2007–08	Liga I	13	6	—		—		—		13	6
Dinamo București	2008–09	Liga I	8	2	2	2	1	0	—		11	4
Dinamo București	2009–10	Liga I	29	16	2	3	7 (Note: Appearances in UEFA Europa League)	1	—		38	20
Dinamo București	2010–11	Liga I	11	4	3	1	4	2	—		18	7
Dinamo București	Total		48	22	7	6	12	3	—		67	31
Politehnica Iași (loan)	2008–09	Liga I	15	7	—		—		—		15	7
Karlsruher SC	2010–11	2. Bundesliga	11	6	—		—		—		11	6
Dinamo București	2012–13	Liga I	19	1	0	0	0	0	0	0	19	1
FC Brașov	2013–14	Liga I	29	8	2	0	—		—		31	8
Gabala	2014–15	Azerbaijan Premier League	9	0	0	0	2	0	—		11	0
Salernitana	2014–15	Lega Pro	8	2	0	0	—		1 (Note: Appearance in Supercoppa di Lega Pro)	1	9	3
Martina Franca	2015–16	Lega Pro	16	3	0	0	—		—		16	3
Politehnica Iași	2015–16	Liga I	17	7	—		—		—		17	7
Politehnica Iași	2016–17	Liga I	35	11	2	1	2	1	1 (Note: Appearance in Cupa Ligii)	0	40	13
Politehnica Iași	2017–18	Liga I	32	9	2	2	—		—		34	11
Politehnica Iași	2018–19	Liga I	19	6	1	0	—		—		20	6
Politehnica Iași	Total		103	33	5	3	2	1	1	0	111	37
Universitatea Craiova	2018–19	Liga I	10	1	0	0	—		—		10	1
Politehnica Iași	2019–20	Liga I	32	6	3	2	—		—		35	8
Politehnica Iași	2020–21	Liga I	17	7	0	0	—		—		17	7
Politehnica Iași	Total		49	13	3	2	—		—		52	15
Mioveni	2021–22	Liga I	13	0	1	0	—		—		14	0
Career total			465	125	27	13	36	6	3	1	531	145

=== International ===
Appearances and goals by national team and year
National team	Year	Apps	Goals
Romania	2003	3	0
Romania	2004	1	0
Romania	2005	2	0
Romania	2009	1	0
Romania	2010	3	0
Total		10	0

== Honours ==
=== Player ===
Steaua București

- Divizia A: 2004–05, 2005–06
- Supercupa României runner-up: 2005

Politehnica Timișoara

- Cupa României runner-up: 2006–07

Salernitana

- Lega Pro: 2014–15

Individual

- Liga I top scorer: 2009–10

=== Manager ===
Popești-Leordeni

- Liga III: 2024–25
