= Marquinhos Carioca =

Brazilian footballer

Personal information
- Full name: Marcus Vinícius Vidal Cunha
- Date of birth: 28 May 1992 (age 34)
- Place of birth: Rio de Janeiro, Brazil
- Height: 1.70 m (5 ft 7 in)
- Position: Winger

Youth career
- Paraná

Senior career*
Years	Team	Apps	(Gls)
2011–2012	Paraná	19	(1)
2013–2014	Oțelul Galați	35	(10)
2014–2015	Gabala	12	(1)
2015	River Plate Montevideo	10	(0)
2016	J. Malucelli	1	(0)
2016–2017	Toledo	11	(3)
2017	Astra Giurgiu	16	(1)
2018	Žalgiris Vilnius	27	(4)
2019	Badak Lampung	28	(7)
2020–2021	Persela Lamongan	0	(0)
2021	→ Oțelul Galați (loan)	3	(0)
Total		162	(27)
- * Club domestic league appearances and goals as of 30 April 2021

Marcus Vinícius Vidal Cunha (born 28 May 1992), commonly known as Marquinhos Carioca or simply Marquinhos, is a Brazilian professional footballer who plays as a winger.

== Career ==
In February 2013 Marquinhos Carioca moved together with fellow Brazilian player João Felipe Antunes to Liga I side Oțelul Galați on a four-year contract. On 16 July 2014, Marquinhos moved to the Azerbaijan Premier League with Gabala FK, signing a two-year contract. Following a change of manager half-way through the 2014–15 season, Marquinhos Carioca had his contract terminated by mutual consent in January 2015, and went on to sign for Uruguayan Primera División side Club Atlético River Plate later the same year. In the 2018 season was a player of FK Žalgiris Vilnius. After one season he left the team.

== Career statistics ==
As of 18 December 2014

Appearances and goals by club, season and competition
Club	Season	League			Cup		Continental		Other (Note: Includes Brazilian state competitions.)		Total	
Club	Season	Division	Apps	Goals	Apps	Goals	Apps	Goals	Apps	Goals	Apps	Goals
Paraná	2011	Série B	2	0	1	0	—		7	0	10	0
Paraná	2012	Série B	17	1	0	0	—		—		17	1
Paraná	Total		19	1	1	0	—		7	0	27	1
Oțelul Galați	2012–13	Liga I	9	0	2	0	—		—		11	0
Oțelul Galați	2013–14	Liga I	26	10	3	2	—		—		29	13
Oțelul Galați	Total		35	10	5	2	—		—		40	12
Gabala	2014–15	Azerbaijan Premier League	12	1	1	0	0	0	—		13	1
River Plate	2011	Uruguayan Primera División	4	0	—		—		—		4	0
River Plate	2012	Uruguayan Primera División	6	0	—		—		—		6	0
River Plate	Total		10	0	—		—		—		10	0
Career total			76	12	7	2	0	0	7	0	90	14

== Honours ==
Žalgiris Vilnius

- Lithuanian Cup: 2018
