= Dmytro Bezotosnyi =

Ukrainian footballer

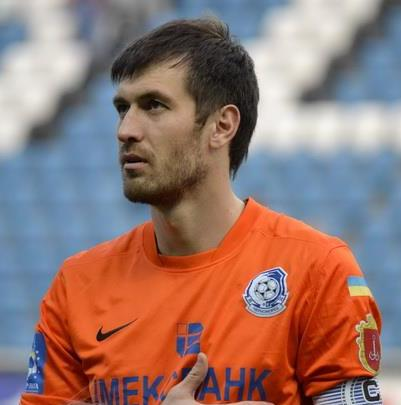
- Bezotosnyi in 2014

Personal information
- Full name: Dmytro Oleksandrovych Bezotosnyi
- Date of birth: 15 November 1983 (age 42)
- Place of birth: Khmelnytskyi, Ukrainian SSR, Soviet Union
- Height: 1.92 m (6 ft 4 in)
- Position: Goalkeeper

Senior career*
Years	Team	Apps	(Gls)
2000–2002	Dnipro Dnipropetrovsk	0	(0)
2001	→ Dnipro-3 Dnipropetrovsk	1	(0)
2001	→ Dnipro-2 Dnipropetrovsk	0	(0)
2002–2004	Saturn-REN-TV Ramenskoe	0	(0)
2005–2011	Metalurh Zaporizhzhia	33	(0)
2005–2007	→ Metalurh-2 Zaporizhzhia	23	(0)
2011–2014	Chornomorets Odesa	90	(0)
2015–2019	Gabala	117	(0)
2019	Chornomorets Odesa	4	(0)
- * Club domestic league appearances and goals as of 21 October 2019

Dmytro Oleksandrovych Bezotosnyi (Ukrainian: Дмитро Олександрович Безотосний; born 15 November 1983) is a Ukrainian footballer who plays as a goalkeeper.

== Career ==
On 15 January 2015, Bezotosnyi signed a six-month contract with Azerbaijan Premier League side Gabala FK, following fellow former FC Chornomorets Odesa teammate Oleksiy Gai to the club. On 21 May 2016, Bezotosnyi signed a new contract with Gabala until the end of the 2016/17 season.

On 21 October 2019, Bezotosnyi left Chornomorets Odesa by mutual consent.

== Career statistics ==
=== Club ===
As of match played 19 October 2019

Appearances and goals by club, season and competition
Club	Season	League			National Cup		Continental		Other		Total	
Club	Season	Division	Apps	Goals	Apps	Goals	Apps	Goals	Apps	Goals	Apps	Goals
Chornomorets	2011–12	Ukrainian Premier League	26	0	3	0	–		–		29	0
Chornomorets	2012–13	Ukrainian Premier League	29	0	5	0	–		–		34	0
Chornomorets	2013–14	Ukrainian Premier League	28	0	2	0	12	0	1	0	31	0
Chornomorets	2014–15	Ukrainian Premier League	8	0	1	0	2	0	–		11	0
Chornomorets	Total		91	0	11	0	14	0	1	0	117	0
Gabala	2014–15	Azerbaijan Premier League	15	0	2	0	0	0	–		17	0
Gabala	2015–16	Azerbaijan Premier League	28	0	4	0	12	0	–		44	0
Gabala	2016–17	Azerbaijan Premier League	27	0	5	0	14	0	–		46	0
Gabala	2017–18	Azerbaijan Premier League	26	0	4	0	4	0	-		34	0
Gabala	2018–19	Azerbaijan Premier League	21	0	2	0	2	0	-		25	0
Gabala	Total		117	0	17	0	32	0	-	-	166	0
Chornomorets	2019–20	Ukrainian First League	4	0	1	0	–		–		5	0
Career total			212	0	29	0	46	0	1	0	288	0

== Honours ==
Gabala

- Azerbaijan Cup: 2018–19
