= Ekigho Ehiosun =

Nigerian football striker

Personal information
- Date of birth: 25 June 1990 (age 36)
- Place of birth: Warri, Nigeria
- Height: 1.80 m (5 ft 11 in)
- Position: Striker

Team information
- Current team: Hapoel Acre
- Number: 90

Youth career
- 2005–2008: Delta United

Senior career*
Years	Team	Apps	(Gls)
2008–2011	Warri Wolves F.C.	40	(17)
2011–2012	Samsunspor	31	(9)
2012–2015	Gençlerbirliği 0	12	(0)
2013–2014	→ Samsunspor (loan)	29	(9)
2014–2015	→ Gabala (loan)	29	(6)
2015–2016	Samsunspor	30	(4)
2016–2017	Gazişehir Gaziantep	22	(6)
2017	Gabala	6	(0)
2018–	Hapoel Acre	30	(4)

International career^{‡}
2011–	Nigeria	6	(5)
- * Club domestic league appearances and goals as of 17 December 2018 ‡ National team caps and goals as of 5 June 2011

Ekigho Ehiosun (born 25 June 1990) is a Nigerian football striker who plays for Hapoel Acre.

== Club career ==
Ehiosun was born in Warri. He moved from Delta United to fellow Delta State team Warri Wolves in 2008. He scored ten goals in 2009-10 to lead the club. One-third of the way through the 2010-11 season Ehiosun was the leading scorer with 7 league goals, including a hat-trick against Sharks F.C.

=== Samsunspor ===
In July 2011, Ehiosun, moved to Turkish club Samsunspor on a one-year contract, with the option of two more.

=== Gençlerbirliği ===
On 3 August 2012, Turkish club Gençlerbirliği signed Ekigho on a three-year deal.

=== Gabala ===
In July 2014, Ehiosun moved to Gabala of the Azerbaijan Premier League on a season-long loan deal.

=== Samsunspor Return ===
In July 2015, Ehiosun resigned for Samsunspor on a two-year contract.

=== Gabala return ===
On 21 September 2017, Ehiosun signed a one-contract with Gabala. Gabala announced that Ehiosun had left the club on 4 January 2018.

== International career ==
After training with the Nigeria National B team, he was called in as an emergency replacement for Victor Anichebe in the Eagles friendly against Sierra Leone. Ehiosun scored seven minutes after coming on as a sub, becoming the 58th player in Nigeria history to score in his debut.

== Career statistics ==
=== Club ===
As of match played 17 May 2019

Appearances and goals by club, season and competition
Club	Season	League			National Cup		League Cup		Continental		Other		Total	
Club	Season	Division	Apps	Goals	Apps	Goals	Apps	Goals	Apps	Goals	Apps	Goals	Apps	Goals
Warri Wolves	2008–09	Nigerian Premier League	5	0			–		–		–		5	0
Warri Wolves	2009–10	Nigerian Premier League	23	10			–				–		23	10
Warri Wolves	2010–11	Nigerian Premier League	12	7			–		–		–		12	7
Warri Wolves	Total		40	17	–	–	–	–	–	–	–	–	40	17
Samsunspor	2011–12	Süper Lig	31	9	1	0	–		–		–		32	9
Gençlerbirliği	2012–13	Süper Lig	12	0	1	0	–		–		–		13	0
Gençlerbirliği	2013–14	Süper Lig	0	0	0	0	–		–		–		0	0
Gençlerbirliği	2014–15	Süper Lig	0	0	0	0	–		–		–		0	0
Gençlerbirliği	Total		12	0	1	0	–	–	–	–	–	–	13	0
Samsunspor (loan)	2013–14	TFF First League	29	9	0	0	–		–		–		29	9
Gabala (loan)	2014–15	Azerbaijan Premier League	29	6	3	0	–		0	0	–		32	6
Samsunspor	2015–16	TFF First League	30	4	1	1	–		–		–		31	5
Gazişehir Gaziantep	2016–17	TFF First League	22	6	0	0	–		–		–		22	6
Gabala	2017–18	Azerbaijan Premier League	6	0	1	1	–		0	0	–		7	1
Hapoel Acre	2018–19	Liga Leumit	30	4	1	0	–		0	0	–		31	4
Career total			299	55	8	2	–	–	0	0	–	–	237	57

=== International ===
Nigeria
Year	Apps	Goals
2011	5	4
2012	1	1
Total	6	5

Statistics accurate as of match played 23 May 2012

=== International goals ===
Scores and results list Nigeria's goal tally first.

No	Date	Venue	Opponent	Score	Result	Competition
1.	9 February 2011	Teslim Balogun Stadium, Lagos, Nigeria	Sierra Leone	2–0	2–1	Friendly
