= Adrian Ropotan =

Romanian footballer

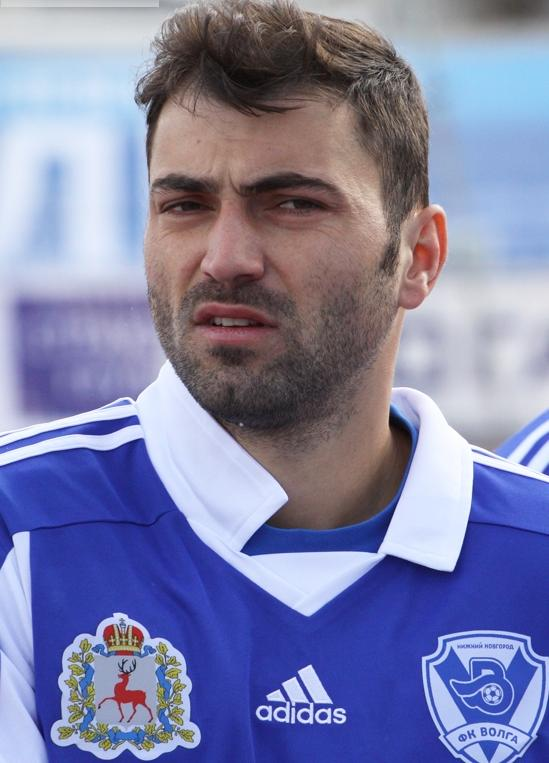
- Ropotan with Volga NN in 2013

Personal information
- Date of birth: 8 May 1986 (age 40)
- Place of birth: Galați, Romania
- Height: 1.85 m (6 ft 1 in)
- Position: Defensive midfielder

Team information
- Current team: Dinamo II București (head coach)

Youth career
- 1994–2000: Salbero Galați
- 2000–2003: Dunărea Galați
- 2003–2004: Argeș Pitești
- 2004–2005: Dinamo București

Senior career*
| Years | Team | Apps | (Gls) |
| 2004–2006 | Dinamo București II | 28 | (0) |
| 2006–2008 | Dinamo București | 71 | (0) |
| 2009–2012 | Dynamo Moscow | 54 | (2) |
| 2011–2012 | → Tom Tomsk (loan) | 18 | (1) |
| 2013–2014 | Volga Nizhny Novgorod | 21 | (0) |
| 2014–2015 | Gabala | 16 | (0) |
| 2015–2016 | Petrolul Ploiești | 18 | (2) |
| 2016 | Pandurii Târgu Jiu | 10 | (1) |
| 2016–2018 | Hatta | 41 | (3) |
| 2018–2019 | Concordia Chiajna | 19 | (2) |
| Total | | 296 | (11) |

International career
| 2006–2008 | Romania U21 | 16 | (0) |
| 2008–2016 | Romania | 7 | (0) |

Managerial career
- 2025–2026: Dinamo București U19
- 2026–: Dinamo II București
- * Club domestic league appearances and goals

Adrian Ropotan (born 8 May 1986) is a Romanian football manager and former professional player, currently in charge of Liga III club Dinamo II București.

== Club career ==
Ropotan was born on 8 May 1986 in Galați, Romania and began playing junior-level football in 1994 at local club Salbero. In 2000 he moved to neighboring club Dunărea and in 2003 he went to Argeș Pitești. In 2004, with the help of Ion Moldovan he joined Dinamo București, where he started his senior career, playing for the club's satellite in Divizia B. Ropotan made his Divizia A debut on 18 March 2006 when coach Marin Ion sent him in the 89th minute to replace Claudiu Niculescu in Dinamo's 2–0 victory against Pandurii Târgu Jiu. In the 2006–07 season, he played 21 league games under coach Mircea Rednic, helping the club win the title. He also appeared in eight matches in the UEFA Cup as the team reached the round of 32 where they were eliminated with 3–1 on aggregate by Benfica. In the following season, The Red Dogs had the objective of reaching the Champions League group stage, with Ropotan playing in both legs of the third qualifying round against Lazio Roma, which was lost with 4–2 on aggregate.

He was transferred to Dynamo Moscow for €3 million on 13 February 2009. He made his Russian Premier League debut on 14 March under coach Andrey Kobelev in a 1–0 home win over FC Moscow. He scored his first goal on 13 September in a 1–1 derby draw against Spartak Moscow. In 2011 he was loaned by Dynamo to Tom Tomsk where he played alongside fellow Romanian Ovidiu Dănănae. After the loan ended, Ropotan returned to Dynamo where he worked with Romanian coach Dan Petrescu. After his contract with Dynamo Moscow expired, he signed for Volga Nizhny Novgorod as a free agent where he was teammates with compatriot Mihăiță Pleșan. On 15 May 2014, Ropotan made his last appearance in the Russian league in Volga's 2–1 home loss to Ural Yekaterinburg, totaling 93 matches with three goals in the competition.

On 22 June 2014, Ropotan signed a one-year contract with Gabala, being brought there alongside Andrei Cristea and Alexandru Benga by coach Dorinel Munteanu. For the 2015–16 season, Ropotan returned to Romania, playing in the first part of the season for Petrolul Ploiești and in the second for Pandurii Târgu Jiu. Subsequently, he went to play in the United Arab Emirates for Hatta Club together with former Pandurii teammate Mihai Răduț. Ropotan ended his career after playing in the 2018–19 Liga I season for Concordia Chiajna, being brought there by coach Dorinel Munteanu. He made his last appearance in the Romanian top-league on 26 May 2019 in Concordia's 4–1 home win over Politehnica Iași, totaling 118 matches with five goals in the competition. However, he could not avoid the team's relegation to the second league at the end of the season.

== International career ==
Ropotan played seven games for Romania, making his debut on 19 November 2008, when coach Victor Pițurcă sent him to replace Costin Lazăr at halftime in a 2–1 friendly victory against Georgia. He appeared in two games in the Euro 2012 qualifiers, a 2–1 away loss to Bosnia and Herzegovina and a 3–1 home victory against Luxembourg. His last appearance for the national team was on 25 May 2016 in a friendly against DR Congo which ended in a 1–1 draw.

== Career statistics ==
=== Club ===
Appearances and goals by club, season and competition
| Club | Season | League | | | National Cup (Note: Includes Cupa României, Russian Cup, Azerbaijan Cup, UAE President's Cup) | | Continental | | Other | | Total | |
| Club | Season | Division | Apps | Goals | Apps | Goals | Apps | Goals | Apps | Goals | Apps | Goals |
|---|---|---|---|---|---|---|---|---|---|---|---|---|
| Dinamo II București | 2004–05 | Divizia B | 7 | 0 | 0 | 0 | – | | – | | 7 | 0 |
| Dinamo II București | 2005–06 | Divizia B | 21 | 0 | 0 | 0 | – | | – | | 21 | 0 |
| Dinamo II București | Total | | 28 | 0 | 0 | 0 | – | | – | | 28 | 0 |
| Dinamo București | 2005–16 | Divizia A | 5 | 0 | – | | – | | – | | 5 | 0 |
| Dinamo București | 2006–07 | Liga I | 21 | 0 | 1 | 0 | 8 (Note: Appearances in UEFA Cup) | 0 | – | | 30 | 0 |
| Dinamo București | 2007–08 | Liga I | 30 | 0 | 3 | 0 | 4 (Note: Two appearances in UEFA Champions League, two appearances in UEFA Cup) | 0 | 1 (Note: Appearance in Supercupa României) | 0 | 38 | 0 |
| Dinamo București | 2008–09 | Liga I | 15 | 0 | 0 | 0 | 2 | 0 | – | | 17 | 0 |
| Dinamo București | Total | | 71 | 0 | 4 | 0 | 14 | 0 | 1 | 0 | 90 | 0 |
| Dynamo Moscow | 2009 | Russian Premier League | 18 | 2 | 1 | 0 | 2 (Note: One appearance in UEFA Champions League, one appearance in UEFA Europa League) | 0 | – | | 21 | 2 |
| Dynamo Moscow | 2010 | Russian Premier League | 20 | 0 | 1 | 0 | – | | – | | 21 | 0 |
| Dynamo Moscow | 2011–12 | Russian Premier League | 10 | 0 | 1 | 0 | – | | – | | 11 | 0 |
| Dynamo Moscow | 2012–13 | Russian Premier League | 6 | 0 | 2 | 0 | 0 | 0 | – | | 8 | 0 |
| Dynamo Moscow | Total | | 54 | 2 | 5 | 0 | 2 | 0 | – | | 61 | 2 |
| Tom Tomsk (loan) | 2011–12 | Russian Premier League | 18 | 1 | 1 | 0 | – | | – | | 19 | 1 |
| Volga Nizhny Novgorod | 2012–13 | Russian Premier League | 6 | 0 | – | | – | | – | | 6 | 0 |
| Volga Nizhny Novgorod | 2013–14 | Russian Premier League | 15 | 0 | 0 | 0 | – | | – | | 15 | 0 |
| Volga Nizhny Novgorod | Total | | 21 | 0 | 0 | 0 | – | | – | | 21 | 0 |
| Gabala | 2014–15 | Azerbaijan Premier League | 16 | 0 | 1 | 0 | 2 (Note: Appearances in UEFA Europa League) | 0 | – | | 19 | 0 |
| Petrolul Ploiești | 2015–16 | Liga I | 18 | 2 | 2 | 0 | – | | 1 (Note: Appearance in Cupa Ligii) | 0 | 21 | 2 |
| Pandurii Târgu Jiu | 2015–16 | Liga I | 10 | 1 | – | | – | | – | | 10 | 1 |
| Hatta | 2016–17 | UAE Pro League | 22 | 3 | 5 | 0 | – | | – | | 27 | 3 |
| Hatta | 2017–18 | UAE Pro League | 19 | 0 | 4 | 0 | – | | – | | 23 | 0 |
| Hatta | Total | | 41 | 3 | 9 | 0 | – | | – | | 50 | 3 |
| Concordia Chiajna | 2018–19 | Liga I | 19 | 2 | – | | – | | – | | 19 | 0 |
| Career total | | | 296 | 11 | 22 | 0 | 18 | 0 | 2 | 0 | 338 | 11 |

=== International ===
Appearances and goals by national team and year
| National team | Year | Apps | Goals |
|---|---|---|---|
Romania
| Romania | 2008 | 1 | 0 |
| Romania | 2009 | 0 | 0 |
| Romania | 2010 | 1 | 0 |
| Romania | 2011 | 3 | 0 |
| Romania | 2016 | 2 | 0 |
| Total | | 7 | 0 |

== Honours ==
Dinamo București

- Liga I: 2006–07
- Supercupa României runner-up: 2007
