= Bohdan Sichkaruk =

Ukrainian footballer

Personal information
- Full name: Bohdan Viktorovych Sichkaruk
- Date of birth: 1 August 1994 (age 32)
- Place of birth: Tetiiv, Ukraine
- Height: 1.89 m (6 ft 2 1/2 in)
- Position: Striker

Youth career
- 2007–2011: Hart-Ros Irpin

Senior career*
Years	Team	Apps	(Gls)
2012	Volodarka	13	(5)
2014	Lokomotyv Kyiv	6	(5)
2014–2015	Vorskla Poltava	2	(0)
2016	Napredak Kruševac	2	(1)
2016–2019	Chaika Petropavlivska Borshchahivka	21	(6)
- * Club domestic league appearances and goals as of 3 May 2025

Bohdan Viktorovych Sichkaruk (Ukrainian: Богдан Вікторович Січкарук; born 1 August 1994) is a Ukrainian former professional footballer who played as a striker.

== Career ==
Born in Tetiiv, Kyiv Oblast, Ukraine, Sichkaruk is a product of Kyiv Oblast youth sportive school system. He was renewed after the long injury and signed a contract with FC Vorskla. Made his debut for FC Vorskla in game against FC Hoverla Uzhhorod on 8 August 2014 in the Ukrainian Premier League. During the winter-break of the 2015–16 season Sickaruk signed with Serbian side FK Napredak Kruševac and played in the second half of the 2015–16 Serbian First League. At the end of the season, Napredak finished top, and achieved promotion to the SuperLiga, however, Sichkaruk left the club and returned to Ukraine where he joined FC Chaika Kyiv-Sviatoshyn Raion.

== Honours ==
Napredak Kruševac

- Serbian First League: 2015–16
