= Yazalde (Portuguese footballer) =

Portuguese footballer

Personal information
- Full name: Yazalde Gomes Pinto
- Date of birth: 21 September 1988 (age 38)
- Place of birth: Vila do Conde, Portugal
- Height: 1.83 m (6 ft 0 in)
- Position: Forward

Team information
- Current team: Anadia

Youth career
- 1999–2007: Varzim

Senior career*
Years	Team	Apps	(Gls)
2007–2008	Varzim	35	(8)
2009–2015	Braga	4	(0)
2009	→ Rio Ave (loan)	15	(4)
2010	→ Olhanense (loan)	14	(1)
2010–2012	→ Rio Ave (loan)	54	(14)
2012	Braga B	16	(1)
2013	→ Beira-Mar (loan)	15	(3)
2013–2014	→ Astra Giurgiu (loan)	26	(7)
2014	→ Gabala (loan)	15	(0)
2015	→ Gil Vicente (loan)	14	(1)
2015–2018	Rio Ave	42	(4)
2018	Belenenses	4	(0)
2018–2019	Gaz Metan Mediaș	24	(5)
2019–2020	Hermannstadt	34	(6)
2020–2021	Najran	0	(0)
2021	Hermannstadt	12	(2)
2022	1599 Șelimbăr	6	(2)
2025–	Anadia	10	(0)
Total		339	(58)

International career
2008	Portugal U20	9	(3)
2008–2010	Portugal U21	16	(5)
2011	Portugal U23	1	(0)
- * Club domestic league appearances and goals as of 23:26, 22 July 2026 (UTC)

Yazalde Gomes Pinto (born 21 September 1988), known simply as Yazalde, is a Portuguese professional footballer who plays as a forward for Anadia.

He achieved Primeira Liga totals of 162 games and 27 goals for six teams, mainly Rio Ave, and was contracted for several seasons by Braga, who loaned him out for most of that time. He also played in Romania and Azerbaijan.

== Club career ==
Born in Vila do Conde, Yazalde began playing professionally with Segunda Liga's Varzim SC, making two appearances late in the 2006–07 season. He went on to establish himself as an important first-team member.

On 15 December 2008, Yazalde moved to Primeira Liga club S.C. Braga, signing a five-and-a-half-year contract effective as of January of the following year. However, he would be immediately loaned until the end of the campaign to league strugglers Rio Ave FC; on 22 February, he scored the game's only goal at home against Vitória de Setúbal.

In mid-January 2010, having appeared rarely for Braga during the season, Yazalde was loaned to fellow top-flight side S.C. Olhanense for five months. In June, he returned to Rio Ave, also on loan.

Yazalde would be consecutively loaned by Braga in the following years, to S.C. Beira-Mar, FC Astra Giurgiu and Gabala FK. On 27 June 2015 he returned to Rio Ave for a third spell, agreeing to a three-year deal.

On 13 September 2018, following a brief spell with C.F. Os Belenenses, the 30-year-old Yazalde returned to the Romanian Liga I after agreeing to a one-year contract at CS Gaz Metan Mediaș. At its conclusion, he moved to FC Hermannstadt of the same league on a two-year deal.

== International career ==
Yazalde represented Portugal at under-21 level. As his father was born in Guinea-Bissau, Luís Norton de Matos, coach of the Guinea-Bissau national team, tried to persuade him to play for the Africans as a senior, but the player aspired to appear for his country of birth.

== Honours ==
Astra Giurgiu

- Cupa României: 2013–14
