= Ricardinho (footballer, born September 1984) =

Brazilian footballer

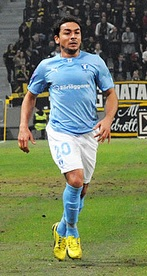
- Ricardinho playing for Malmö FF in 2013

Personal information
- Full name: Ricardo Ferreira da Silva Kubitski
- Date of birth: 9 September 1984 (age 42)
- Place of birth: Curitiba, Brazil
- Height: 1.68 m (5 ft 6 in)
- Position: Left-back

Team information
- Current team: São Joseense

Youth career
- –2003: Coritiba

Senior career*
Years	Team	Apps	(Gls)
2003–2009	Coritiba	157	(13)
2007	→ Atlético Mineiro (loan)	5	(0)
2009–2014	Malmö FF	159	(3)
2015–2017	Gabala	36	(1)
2017–2018	Oxford United	36	(3)
2018–2019	Twente	34	(1)
2023–	São Joseense	10	(0)
- * Club domestic league appearances and goals as of 15:49, 9 July 2023 (UTC)

Ricardo Ferreira da Silva Kubitski, or simply Ricardinho (Brazilian Portuguese: [ʁikɐʁˈdʒĩɲu]; born 9 September 1984), is a Brazilian professional footballer who plays as a left-back for São Joseense. He has played for clubs in Brazil, Sweden, Azerbaijan, England, and the Netherlands.

== Club career ==
=== In Brazil ===
Born in Curitiba, Ricardinho started his career in Coritiba where he played from youth teams to the first team and established himself in the starting eleven. He played over 100 games in Coritiba, winning two Campeonato Paranaense in the process. In 2009, he moved to Europe and Sweden for Malmö FF.

=== Malmö FF ===
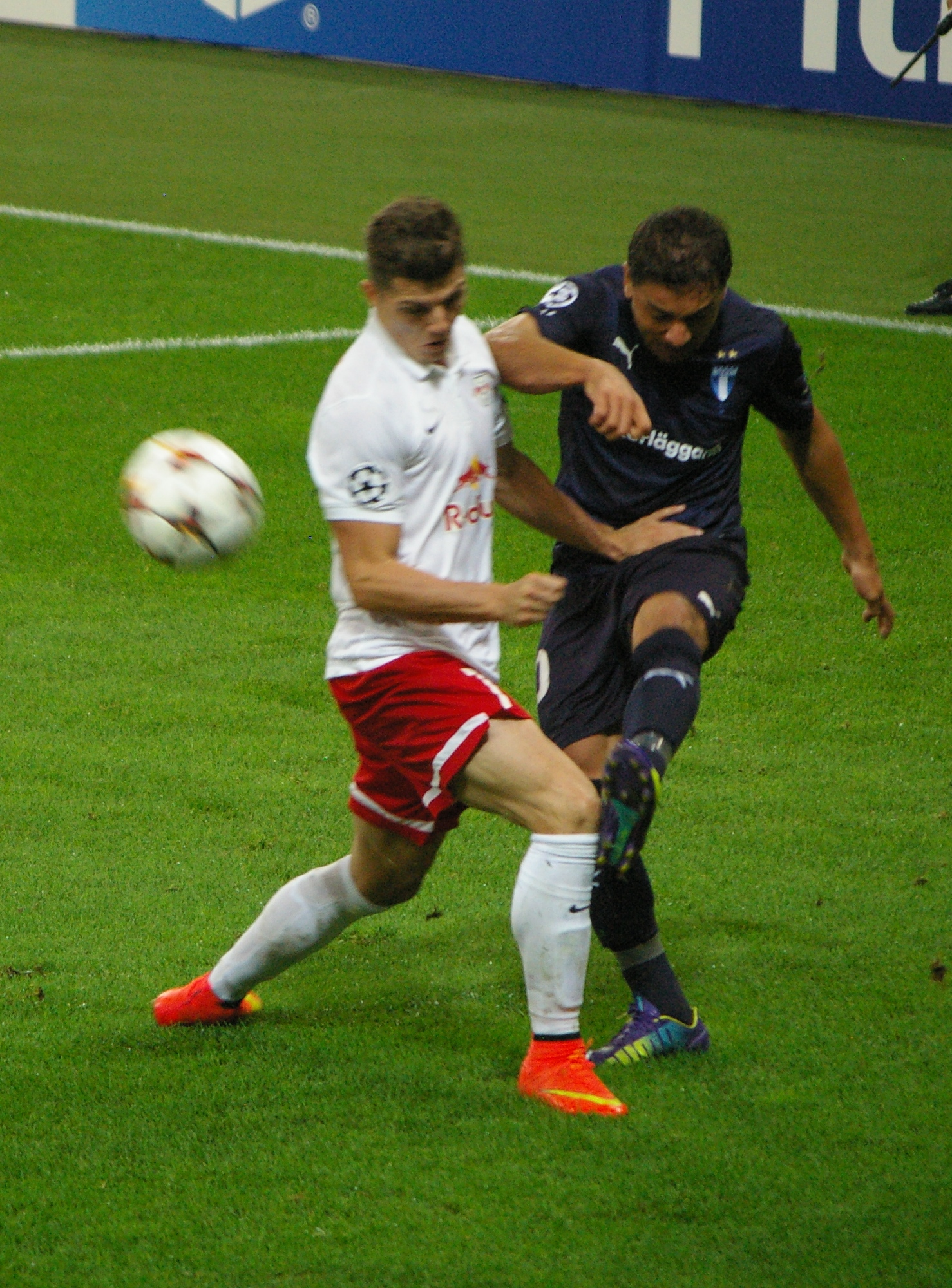
Ricardinho playing for Malmö FF in a Champions League qualifier against Red Bull Salzburg in 2014.

At Malmö FF Ricardinho was first-choice left back. At the beginning of the 2010 season he broke his foot and missed the first five games of the season. After recovery he came back and reclaimed his place in the starting eleven for the remainder of the league-winning season. For the 2011 season he was the only player of the club to play all 30 league matches. He also played for the club in the qualifying stages to the 2011–12 UEFA Champions League and in the group stage of the 2011–12 UEFA Europa League. During the 2011 season Ricardinho signed a new contract to the end of the 2014 season.

Ricardinho played in 28 of 30 matches for Malmö FF during the 2012 season and scored 2 league goals. The following season the club won the league title and Ricardinho played 27 league matches. He also played in all of the club's six matches in the qualifying stages of the 2013–14 UEFA Europa League. In his last season at Malmö FF he played in 23 league fixtures as well as in 10 matches for the club's campaign in the 2014–15 UEFA Champions League. On 13 December 2014 Ricardinho announced that he would not renew his contract with the club.

=== Gabala ===
On 16 February 2015, Ricardinho signed a contract with Gabala FK in the Azerbaijan Premier League till the end of the 2014–15 season.

=== Oxford United ===
On 3 August 2017, Ricardinho signed for English League One side Oxford United on a one-year deal, with the option of a further year. He scored his first goal for the club on 7 October, the second of three unanswered goals against AFC Wimbledon in a League One fixture at the Kassam Stadium. He was voted the Players' Player of the Year at the end of the 2017–18 season. Ricardinho was, and remains, an immensely popular, almost cult-like player among Oxford fans, who particularly revered his high work rate and seemingly perennial smile. His legacy was underlined when, in January 2021, he was voted the club's 21st-most popular player of the 2010s, despite having only played for the Yellows for a single season.

=== Twente ===
After turning down a contract extension with Oxford, Ricardindo signed for Dutch side FC Twente on a free transfer on 27 July 2018.

== International career ==
Ricardinho is eligible for international play for both Brazil and Sweden. He has never been capped for Brazil and in October 2014 he became a Swedish citizen after living in the country for five years.

== Career statistics ==
=== Club ===
As of match played 1 July 2019

Appearances and goals by club, season and competition
Club	Season	League			National cup		League cup		Continental		Other		Total	
Club	Season	Division	Apps	Goals	Apps	Goals	Apps	Goals	Apps	Goals	Apps	Goals	Apps	Goals
Coritiba	2003	Série A	2	0	–		–		–		–		2	0
Coritiba	2004	Série A	34	2	–		–		–		–		34	2
Coritiba	2005	Série A	37	5	–		–		–		–		37	5
Coritiba	2006	Série B	34	3	–		–		–		–		34	3
Coritiba	2007	Série B	13	1	–		–		–		–		13	1
Coritiba	2008	Série A	37	2	–		–		–		–		37	2
Coritiba	Total		157	13	0	0	0	0	0	0	0	0	157	13
Atlético Mineiro (loan)	2007	Série A	4	0	–		–		–		–		4	0
Malmö FF	2009	Allsvenskan	29	1	1	0	–		–		–		30	1
Malmö FF	2010	Allsvenskan	22	0	2	0	–		–		–		24	0
Malmö FF	2011	Allsvenskan	30	0	3	0	–		10	0	–		43	0
Malmö FF	2012	Allsvenskan	28	2	1	0	–		–		–		29	2
Malmö FF	2013	Allsvenskan	27	0	3	0	–		6	0	–		36	0
Malmö FF	2014	Allsvenskan	23	0	5	0	–		10	0	–		38	0
Malmö FF	Total		159	3	15	0	0	0	26	0	0	0	200	3
Gabala	2014–15	Azerbaijan Premier League	10	0	1	0	–		0	0	–		11	0
Gabala	2015–16	Azerbaijan Premier League	16	0	4	1	–		13	0	—		33	1
Gabala	2016–17	Azerbaijan Premier League	10	1	1	0	–		14	1	—		25	2
Gabala	Total		36	1	6	1	0	0	27	1	0	0	69	3
Oxford United	2017–18	League One	36	3	0	0	0	0	–		3	0	39	3
Twente	2018–19	Eerste Divisie	34	1	3	0	–		–		0	0	37	1
Career total			426	21	24	1	0	0	53	1	3	0	506	23

== Honours ==
Coritiba

- Campeonato Paranaense: 2003, 2004, 2008

Atlético Mineiro

- Campeonato Mineiro: 2007

Malmö FF

- Allsvenskan: 2010, 2013, 2014
- Svenska Supercupen: 2013, 2014

Twente

- Eerste Divisie: 2018–19
