= Aliyar Aghayev =

Azerbaijani football referee

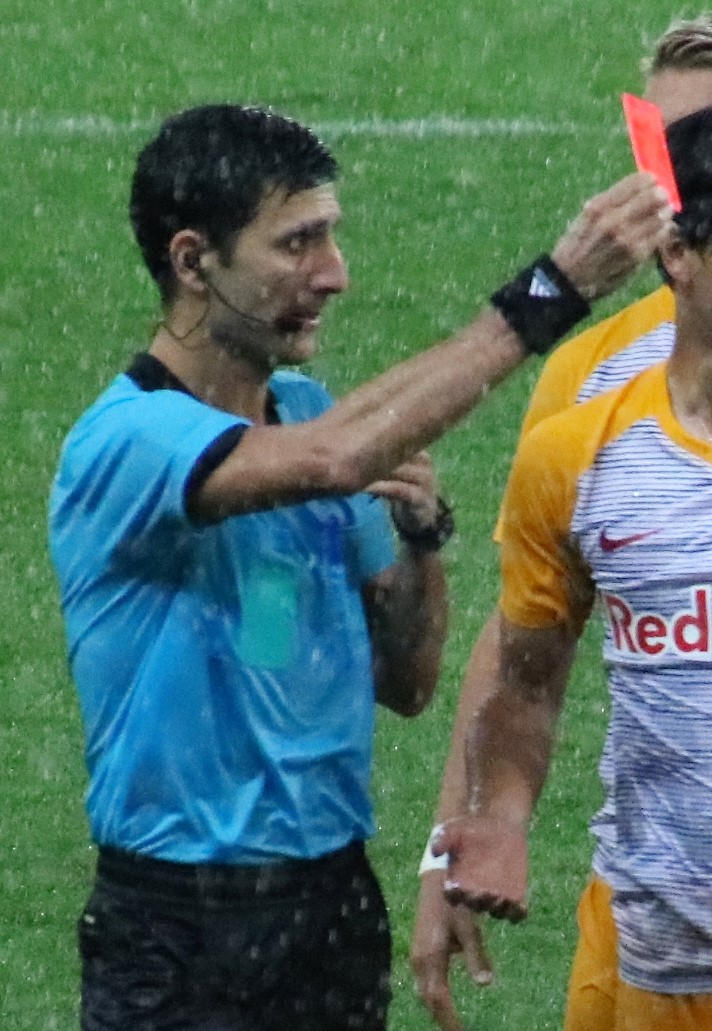
- Born: 17 October 1987 (age 39); Baku, Azerbaijan SSR, Soviet Union

Domestic
Years	League	Role
2009–	Azerbaijan Premier League	Referee

International
Years	League	Role
2013–	FIFA listed	Referee

Aliyar Aghayev (Azerbaijani: Əliyar Ağayev; born 17 October 1987) is an Azerbaijani football referee who officiates in the Azerbaijan Premier League. He has been a FIFA referee since 2013, and is ranked as a UEFA first category referee.

== Refereeing career ==
He refereed at 2015–16, 2016–17, 2017–18, 2018–19, 2019–20, 2020–21, 2021–22, 2022–23 UEFA Europa League group stage.

Aghayev officiated the 2016 UEFA European Under-19 Championship Final match of France vs. Italy at Rhein-Neckar-Arena in Sinsheim, Germany on 24 July 2016.

On 2 November 2022, Aghayev officiated his first UEFA Champions League group stage match between Copenhagen and Borussia Dortmund, becoming the first referee from Azerbaijan to officiate a UEFA Champions League match.
