= Gabala City Stadium =

Multi-use stadium in Gabala, Azerbaijan

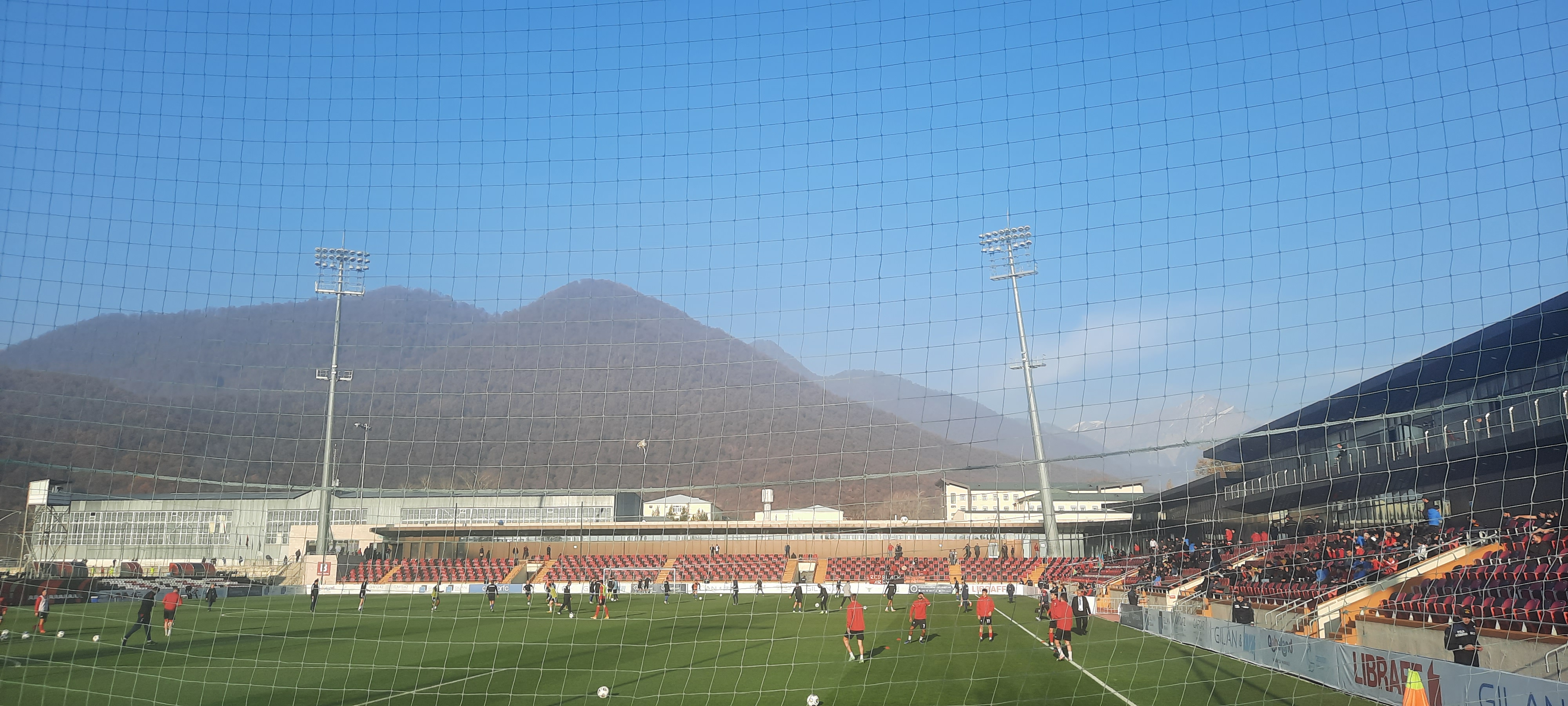
- Interactive map of Gabala City Stadium
- Location: Gabala, Azerbaijan
- Coordinates: 40°59′07″N 47°50′33″E
- Owner: Gabala FC
- Capacity: 3,748
- Surface: Grass

Construction
- Built: 1985

Tenant
- Gabala FC

Gabala City Stadium is a multi-use stadium in Gabala, Azerbaijan.It is currently used mostly for football matches and is the home stadium of Gabala FK. The stadium has an all-seated capacity of 2,000 spectators.

It is planned to start the reconstruction of the stadium in 2012 and expand the capacity of the stadium up to 15,000 seats.

== See also ==
- List of football stadiums in Azerbaijan
