= Alexandru Benga =

Romanian footballer

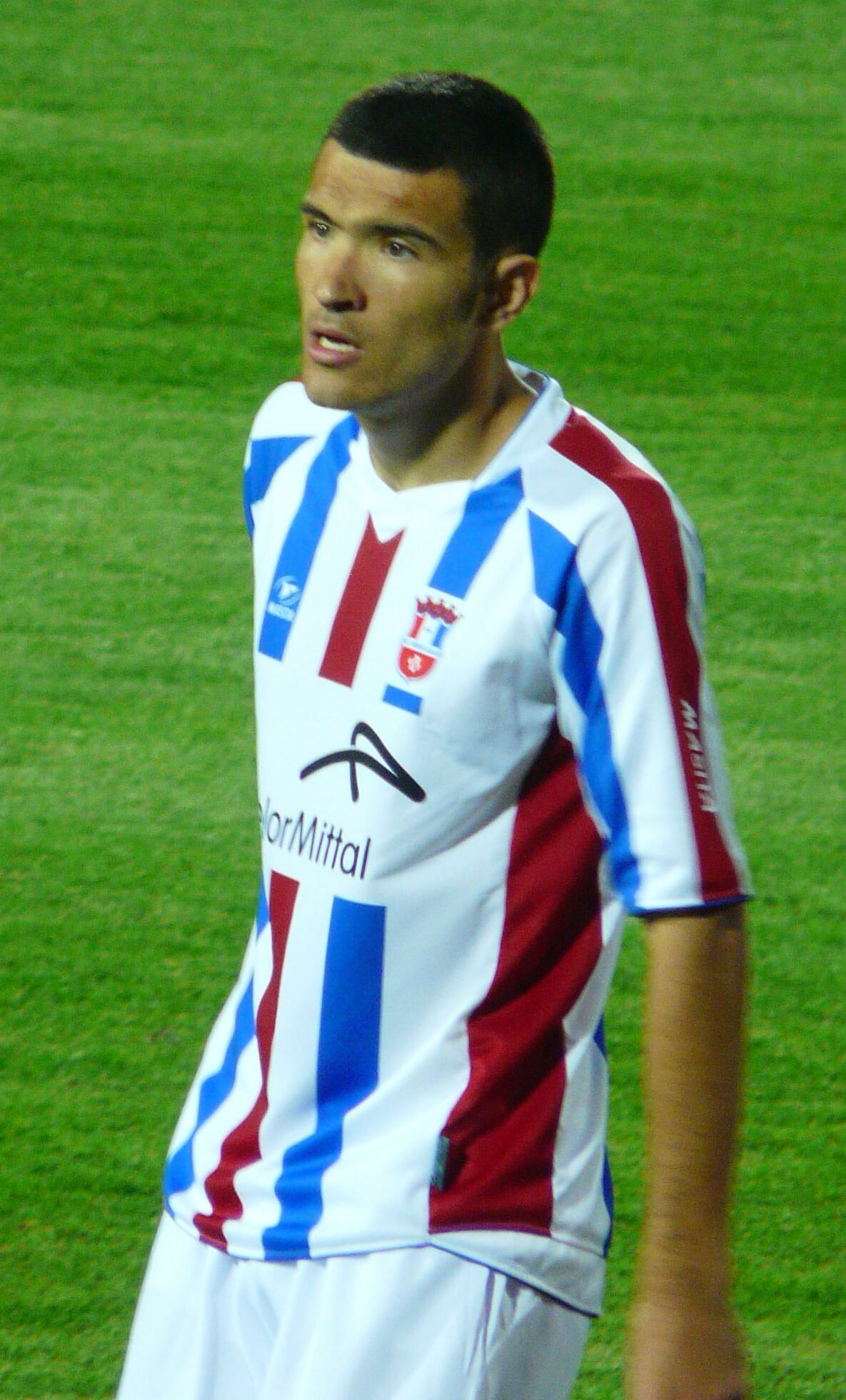
- Benga in 2011

Personal information
- Full name: Alexandru Constantin Benga
- Date of birth: 15 June 1989 (age 37)
- Place of birth: Brașov, Romania
- Height: 1.88 m (6 ft 2 in)
- Position: Centre-back

Team information
- Current team: UTA Arad
- Number: 4

Youth career
- 2000–2006: FC Brașov

Senior career*
Years	Team	Apps	(Gls)
2006–2010	FC Brașov	10	(0)
2007–2008	→ FC Săcele (loan)	14	(2)
2008–2009	→ Forex Brașov (loan)	7	(0)
2009–2011	→ Petrolul Ploiești (loan)	46	(5)
2011–2013	Oțelul Galați	20	(1)
2013	Petrolul Ploiești	15	(1)
2014	Botev Plovdiv	9	(0)
2014–2015	Gabala	8	(0)
2015–2016	Petrolul Ploiești	34	(1)
2016–2017	Ermis Aradippou	27	(1)
2017	Juventus București	16	(0)
2018	Sandecja Nowy Sącz	11	(0)
2018–2019	Septemvri Sofia	24	(0)
2019–2020	Chindia Târgoviște	30	(1)
2020–	UTA Arad	174	(5)

International career
2008	Romania U19	3	(0)
- * Club domestic league appearances and goals as of 6 November 2026

Alexandru Constantin Benga (born 15 June 1989) is a Romanian professional footballer who plays as a centre-back for Liga I club UTA Arad, which he captains.

== Career ==
Benga joined Botev Plovdiv on 18 January 2014.

On 22 July 2014, Benga signed a one-year contract with Gabala of the Azerbaijan Premier League. In December of the same year, following the appointment of Roman Hryhorchuk, Benga was told he was no longer required by the club, and continued to train in Gabala on his own instead of terminating his contract early, eventually leaving the club in June 2015. After leaving Gabala, Benga returned to Petrolul Ploiești, signing a three-year contract.

In January 2018, Benga joined Polish club Sandecja Nowy Sącz on a 6-month contract. He made his Ekstraklasa debut in 0–0 draw against Śląsk Wrocław on 3 March 2018. After Sandecja's relegation by the end of 2017–18 season, he left the club.

On 3 July 2018, Benga signed with Bulgarian club Septemvri Sofia.

== Career statistics ==
As of match played 6 November 2026

Appearances and goals by club, season and competition
Club	Season	League			National cup (Note: Includes Cupa României, Bulgarian Cup)		League cup (Note: Includes Cupa Ligii)		Europe		Other		Total	
Club	Season	Division	Apps	Goals	Apps	Goals	Apps	Goals	Apps	Goals	Apps	Goals	Apps	Goals
FC Brașov	2006–07	Liga II	10	0	0	0	—		—		—		10	0
FC Săcele (loan)	2007–08	Liga II	14	2	0	0	—		—		—		14	2
Forex Brașov (loan)	2008–09	Liga II	7	0	0	0	—		—		—		7	0
Petrolul Ploiești (loan)	2009–10	Liga II	21	1	0	0	—		—		—		21	1
Petrolul Ploiești (loan)	2010–11	Liga II	25	4	1	0	—		—		—		26	4
Petrolul Ploiești (loan)	Total		46	5	1	0	—		—		—		47	5
Oțelul Galați	2011–12	Liga I	1	0	1	0	—		1 (Note: Appearance in UEFA Champions League)	0	—		3	0
Oțelul Galați	2012–13	Liga I	19	1	4	0	—		—		—		23	1
Oțelul Galați	Total		20	1	5	0	0	0	1	0	0	0	26	1
Petrolul Ploiești	2013–14	Liga I	15	1	3	0	—		2 (Note: Appearances in UEFA Europa League)	0	—		20	1
Botev Plovdiv	2013–14	A PFG	9	0	1	0	—		—		—		10	0
Botev Plovdiv	2014–15	A PFG	0	0	0	0	—		2	1	—		2	1
Botev Plovdiv	Total		9	0	1	0	0	0	2	1	0	0	12	1
Gabala	2014–15	Azerbaijan Premier League	8	0	0	0	—		—		—		8	0
Petrolul Ploiești	2015–16	Liga I	34	1	2	1	1	0	—		—		37	2
Ermis Aradippou	2016–17	Cypriot First Division	27	1	0	0	—		—		—		27	1
Juventus București	2017–18	Liga I	16	0	1	0	—		—		—		17	0
Sandecja Nowy Sącz	2017–18	Ekstraklasa	11	0	—		—		—		—		11	0
Septemvri Sofia	2018–19	Bulgarian First League	24	0	3	0	—		—		3 (Note: Includes matches in relegation play-offs)	0	30	0
Chindia Târgoviște	2019–20	Liga I	30	1	0	0	—		—		2	0	32	1
UTA Arad	2020–21	Liga I	22	0	1	0	—		—		—		23	0
UTA Arad	2021–22	Liga I	32	0	0	0	—		—		—		32	0
UTA Arad	2022–23	Liga I	38	2	6	0	—		—		—		44	2
UTA Arad	2023–24	Liga I	28	0	4	0	—		—		—		32	0
UTA Arad	2024–25	Liga I	16	1	1	0	—		—		—		17	1
UTA Arad	2025–26	Liga I	25	2	3	0	—		—		—		28	2
UTA Arad	2026–27	Liga I	13	0	2	0	—		—		—		15	0
UTA Arad	Total		174	5	17	0	—		—		0	0	191	5
Career total			444	17	33	1	1	0	5	1	5	0	488	19

== Honours ==
Petrolul Ploiești

- Liga II: 2010–11

Oțelul Galați

- Supercupa României: 2011

Botev Plovdiv

- Bulgarian Cup runner-up: 2014
