= 2016–17 Gabala FC season =

Gabala
2016-17 season
- Chairman: Tale Heydarov
- Manager: Roman Hryhorchuk
- Stadium: Gabala City Stadium
- Premier League: 2nd
- Azerbaijan Cup: Runners-up
- Europa League: Group Stage
- Top goalscorer: League: Filip Ozobić (11); All: Filip Ozobić (15)
| Home colours | Away colours |

The 2016–17 season is Gabala FK's 12th season, and their 11th in the Azerbaijan Premier League, the top-flight of Azerbaijani football. As well as participating in the Premier League, Gabala will take part in the Azerbaijan Cup and UEFA Europa League.

== Transfers ==
=== Summer ===
In: Note: Flags indicate national team as defined under FIFA eligibility rules; some limited exceptions apply. Players may hold more than one non-FIFA nationality.

| No. | Pos. | Nation | Player |
|---|---|---|---|
| 7 | MF | GEO | Nika Kvekveskiri (from (Azerbaijan) Inter Baku) |
| 10 | FW | AZE | Ruslan Qurbanov (from (Azerbaijan) Neftchi Baku) |
| 14 | MF | AZE | Javid Huseynov |
| 18 | FW | FRA | Bagaliy Dabo (from (France) US Créteil) |
| 19 | MF | CRO | Filip Ozobić (from (Croatia) Slaven Belupo) |
| 27 | MF | LBR | Theo Weeks (loan from (Cyprus) Ermis Aradippou) |
| 30 | MF | CRO | Petar Franjić (from (Croatia) RNK Split) |
| 39 | DF | AZE | Sadig Guliyev (loan return from (Azerbaijan) Zira) |
| 88 | MF | AZE | Tellur Mutallimov (loan return from (Azerbaijan) Zira) |

Out: Note: Flags indicate national team as defined under FIFA eligibility rules; some limited exceptions apply. Players may hold more than one non-FIFA nationality.

| No. | Pos. | Nation | Player |
|---|---|---|---|
| 1 | GK | AZE | Andrey Popovich |
| 5 | DF | AZE | Pavlo Pashayev (to (Ukraine) Stal) |
| 7 | FW | BIH | Ermin Zec (to (Turkey) Kardemir Karabükspor) |
| 10 | FW | BRA | Dodô (to (Brazil) Joinville) |
| 18 | MF | AZE | Vadim Abdullayev |
| 19 | MF | UKR | Oleksiy Gai (to (Russia) Kuban Krasnodar) |
| 21 | DF | AZE | Arif Dashdemirov (to (Azerbaijan) Qarabağ) |
| 66 | MF | AZE | Samir Zargarov (to (Azerbaijan) Inter Baku) |
| 69 | FW | UKR | Oleksiy Antonov |
| 74 | DF | AZE | Yusif Nabiyev (loan to (Azerbaijan) Sumgayit) |
| 87 | DF | AZE | Ruslan Abışov (to (Azerbaijan) Inter Baku) |
| — | MF | AZE | Tarzin Jahangirov (to (Azerbaijan) Neftchi Baku, previously on loan to (Azerbaijan) Zira) |

=== Winter ===
In: Note: Flags indicate national team as defined under FIFA eligibility rules; some limited exceptions apply. Players may hold more than one non-FIFA nationality.

| No. | Pos. | Nation | Player |
|---|---|---|---|
| 5 | DF | AZE | Rasim Ramaldanov (from (Georgia (country)) Kolkheti-1913 Poti) |
| 31 | FW | SUI | Danijel Subotić (from (Moldova) Sheriff Tiraspol) |
| 77 | MF | AZE | Araz Abdullayev (from (Azerbaijan) Neftchi Baku) |

Out: Note: Flags indicate national team as defined under FIFA eligibility rules; some limited exceptions apply. Players may hold more than one non-FIFA nationality.

| No. | Pos. | Nation | Player |
|---|---|---|---|
| 30 | MF | CRO | Petar Franjić (to (Slovenia) NK Domžale) |
| 39 | DF | AZE | Sadig Guliyev (to (Azerbaijan) Zira) |
| 77 | MF | AZE | Ehtiram Shahverdiyev (loan to (Azerbaijan) Sumgayit) |
| — | DF | AZE | Bahlul Mustafazade (loan to (Azerbaijan) Sumgayit) |

=== Released ===
| Date | Position | Nationality | Name | Joined | Date |
|---|---|---|---|---|---|
| 30 May 2017 | DF | (Brazil) | Rafael Santos | | |
| 30 May 2017 | MF | (Azerbaijan) | Rashad Sadiqov | Zira | 1 June 2017 |
| 30 May 2017 | MF | (Georgia (country)) | Nika Kvekveskiri | Tobol | |
| 30 May 2017 | FW | (Estonia) | Sergei Zenjov | KS Cracovia | 27 June 2017 |
| 30 May 2017 | DF | (Azerbaijan) | Magomed Mirzabekov | Neftchi Baku | 12 June 2017 |
| 30 May 2017 | FW | (Switzerland) | Danijel Subotić | Ulsan Hyundai | 11 July 2017 |
| 30 May 2017 | FW | (Azerbaijan) | Rashad Eyyubov | Sumgayit | 1 June 2017 |

== Squad ==
As of match played 5 May 2017

| No. | Name | Nationality | Position | Date of birth (age) | Signed from | Signed in | Contract ends | Apps. | Goals |
Goalkeepers
| 22 | Dmytro Bezotosnyi | (Ukraine) | GK | 15 November 1983 (aged 33) | Chornomorets Odesa | 2015 | 2017 | 107 | 0 |
| 30 | Suleyman Suleymanov | (Azerbaijan) | GK | 20 March 1997 (aged 20) | Trainee | 2015 | | 0 | 0 |
| 33 | Dawid Pietrzkiewicz | (Poland) | GK | 9 February 1988 (aged 29) | | 2015 | | 14 | 0 |
| 35 | Murad Popov | (Azerbaijan) | GK | 5 March 1999 (aged 18) | Trainee | 2016 | | 0 | 0 |
Defenders
| 2 | Sahil Mirzayev | (Azerbaijan) | DF | 18 January 1997 (aged 20) | Trainee | 2015 | | 0 | 0 |
| 3 | Vojislav Stanković | (Serbia) | DF | 22 September 1987 (aged 29) | Inter Baku | 2017 | | 81 | 2 |
| 5 | Rasim Ramaldanov | (Azerbaijan) | DF | 24 January 1986 (aged 31) | Kolkheti-1913 Poti | 2017 | 2017 | 7 | 0 |
| 13 | Murad Musayev | (Azerbaijan) | DF | 13 June 1994 (aged 22) | Trainee | 2012 | | 9 | 0 |
| 15 | Vitaliy Vernydub | (Ukraine) | DF | 17 October 1987 (aged 29) | Zorya Luhansk | 2015 | 2016 | 53 | 3 |
| 17 | Magomed Mirzabekov | (Azerbaijan) | DF | 16 November 1990 (aged 26) | Inter Baku | 2015 | | 62 | 0 |
| 20 | Ricardinho | (Brazil) | DF | 9 September 1984 (aged 32) | Malmö | 2015 | | 69 | 3 |
| 34 | Urfan Abbasov | (Azerbaijan) | DF | 14 October 1992 (aged 24) | Qarabağ | 2011 | | 157 | 2 |
| 44 | Rafael Santos | (Brazil) | DF | 10 November 1984 (aged 32) | Arsenal Kyiv | 2014 | 2017 | 104 | 2 |
| 74 | Yusif Nabiyev | (Azerbaijan) | DF | 3 September 1997 (aged 19) | Trainee | 2015 | | 0 | 0 |
Midfielders
| 4 | Elvin Jamalov | (Azerbaijan) | MF | 4 February 1995 (aged 22) | Trainee | 2013 | | 93 | 0 |
| 6 | Rashad Sadiqov | (Azerbaijan) | MF | 8 October 1983 (aged 33) | Khazar Lankaran | 2015 | | 91 | 2 |
| 7 | Nika Kvekveskiri | (Georgia (country)) | MF | 29 May 1992 (aged 24) | Inter Baku | 2016 | | 29 | 1 |
| 8 | Qismət Alıyev | (Azerbaijan) | MF | 24 October 1996 (aged 20) | Trainee | 2014 | | 14 | 0 |
| 11 | Asif Mammadov | (Azerbaijan) | MF | 5 August 1986 (aged 30) | Inter Baku | 2015 | 2016 | 62 | 6 |
| 14 | Javid Huseynov | (Azerbaijan) | MF | 9 March 1988 (aged 29) | FK Baku | 2016 | 2017 | 61 | 15 |
| 16 | Emin Zamanov | (Azerbaijan) | MF | 26 December 1997 (aged 19) | Trainee | 2015 | | 0 | 0 |
| 19 | Filip Ozobić | (Croatia) | MF | 8 April 1991 (aged 26) | Slaven Belupo | 2016 | 2018 | 45 | 15 |
| 26 | Ülvi İbazadə | (Azerbaijan) | MF | 26 August 1996 (aged 20) | Trainee | 2016 | | 1 | 0 |
| 27 | Theo Weeks | (Liberia) | MF | 19 January 1990 (aged 27) | Loan from Ermis Aradippou | 2016 | 2017 | 33 | 7 |
| 29 | Hajiaga Hajiyev | (Azerbaijan) | MF | 30 January 1998 (aged 19) | Trainee | 2016 | | 0 | 0 |
| 70 | Farid Nabiyev | (Azerbaijan) | MF | 22 July 1999 (aged 17) | Trainee | 2015 | | 2 | 0 |
| 77 | Araz Abdullayev | (Azerbaijan) | MF | 18 April 1992 (aged 25) | Neftchi Baku | 2016 | 2018 | 11 | 0 |
| 88 | Tellur Mutallimov | (Azerbaijan) | MF | 8 April 1995 (aged 22) | Trainee | 2014 | | 22 | 4 |
Forwards
| 9 | Sergei Zenjov | (Estonia) | ST | 20 April 1989 (aged 28) | Torpedo Moscow | 2015 | 2017 | 80 | 14 |
| 10 | Ruslan Qurbanov | (Azerbaijan) | ST | 12 September 1991 (aged 25) | Neftchi Baku | 2016 | 2018 | 30 | 7 |
| 18 | Bagaliy Dabo | (France) | ST | 27 July 1988 (aged 28) | US Créteil | 2016 | 2018 | 29 | 11 |
| 21 | Roman Huseynov | (Azerbaijan) | ST | 26 December 1997 (aged 19) | Trainee | 2015 | | 14 | 1 |
| 31 | Danijel Subotić | (Switzerland) | ST | 31 January 1989 (aged 28) | Sheriff Tiraspol | 2017 | 2017 | 48 | 19 |
| 32 | Rashad Eyyubov | (Azerbaijan) | ST | 3 December 1995 (aged 21) | Kapaz | 2016 | | 41 | 5 |
| 90 | Ramil Hasanov | (Ukraine) | ST | 15 February 1996 (aged 21) | Tavriya | 2015 | | 2 | 0 |
Left during the season
| 30 | Petar Franjić | (Croatia) | MF | 21 August 1991 (aged 25) | RNK Split | 2016 | 2018 | 9 | 0 |
| 39 | Sadig Guliyev | (Azerbaijan) | DF | 9 March 1995 (aged 22) | Trainee | 2012 | | 18 | 0 |

=== Out on loan ===
Note: Flags indicate national team as defined under FIFA eligibility rules; some limited exceptions apply. Players may hold more than one non-FIFA nationality.

| No. / Pos. / Nation / Player; — / DF / AZE / Bahlul Mustafazade (at Sumgayit) | No. / Pos. / Nation / Player; — / MF / AZE / Ehtiram Shahverdiyev (at Sumgayit) |

== Friendlies ==
| 18 June 2016 | Dila Gori (Georgia (country)) | 0 – 2 | (Azerbaijan) Gabala | Gori, Georgia |
| AZT (UTC+4) | | Report | Eyyubov 60'; R.Hasanov 63' | Stadium: Tengiz Burjanadze Stadium |

| 22 June 2016 | Sioni Bolnisi (Georgia (country)) | 0 – 4 | (Azerbaijan) Gabala | Bolnisi, Georgia |
| AZT (UTC+4) | | Report | Ozobić 6'; Weeks 15'; Sadiqov 65' (pen.); E.Shahverdiyev 74' | Stadium: Tamaz Stepania Stadium |

| 26 June 2016 | Sioni Bolnisi (Georgia (country)) | 1 – 1 | (Azerbaijan) Gabala | Bolnisi, Georgia |
| AZT (UTC+4) | 35' | Report | Kvekveskiri 20' | Stadium: Tamaz Stepania Stadium |

| 4 September 2016 | Dinamo-Auto Tiraspol (Moldova) | 0 – 2 | (Azerbaijan) Gabala | Ukraine |
| 19:00 AZT (UTC+4) | | Report | Dabo 79'; Eyyubov 90' |

| 13 January 2017 | Partizani Tirana (Albania) | 2 – 1 | (Azerbaijan) Gabala | Turkey |
| AZT (UTC+4) | Ekuban 45'; Jamalov 84' (o.g.) | Report | Kvekveskiri 43' |

| 18 January 2017 | Gaz Metan Mediaș (Romania) | 0 – 1 | (Azerbaijan) Gabala | Turkey |
| AZT (UTC+4) | | Report | Ozobić 30' |

| 19 January 2017 | Ordabasy (Kazakhstan) | 0 – 0 | (Azerbaijan) Gabala | Turkey |
| AZT (UTC+4) | | Report |

| 24 January 2017 | Shkëndija (North Macedonia) | 1 – 2 | (Azerbaijan) Gabala | Turkey |
| AZT (UTC+4) | Čolak 89' | Report | Ozobić 38'; Abdullayev 77' |

== Competitions ==
=== Azerbaijan Premier League ===
==== Results summary ====
| Overall | | | | | | | | Home | | | | | | Away | | | | | |
| Pld | W | D | L | GF | GA | GD | Pts | W | D | L | GF | GA | GD | W | D | L | GF | GA | GD |
|---|---|---|---|---|---|---|---|---|---|---|---|---|---|---|---|---|---|---|---|
| 28 | 14 | 10 | 4 | 47 | 18 | +29 | 52 | 11 | 3 | 0 | 26 | 4 | +22 | 3 | 7 | 4 | 21 | 14 | +7 |

Last updated: 29 April 2017.
Source: See Results

==== Results ====
| 8 August 2016 1 | Gabala | 2 – 0 | Kapaz | Baku |
| 19:00 AZT (UTC+4) | Abbasov (yellow card) 48'; Mutallimov (yellow card) 52' (goal) 58'; Jamalov (yellow card) 58'; Dabo 79' | Report | Ebah (yellow card) 29' | Stadium: Dalga Arena; Attendance: 300; Referee: Fariz Yusifov |

| 12 August 2016 2 | Gabala | 0 – 0 | Inter Baku | Baku |
| 20:00 AZT (UTC+4) | Santos (yellow card) 6'; Abbasov (yellow card) 31'; Weeks (yellow card) 86'; Zenjov (yellow card) 90' | Report | F.Bayramov (yellow card) 21'; Qirtimov (yellow card) 50'; S.Zargarov (yellow card) 84'; Khizanishvili (yellow card) 86' | Stadium: Dalga Arena; Attendance: 500; Referee: Rauf Jabbarov |

| 21 August 2016 3 | Gabala | – | Sumgayit | Qabala |
| 20:00 AZT (UTC+4) | | [ Report] | | Stadium: Gabala City Stadium |

| 10 September 2016 4 | Neftchi Baku | 0 – 8 | Gabala | Masazır |
| 20:00 AZT (UTC+4) | Abdullayev (yellow card) 75' | Report | Dabo 6', 16', 59'; Vernydub 10'; Ozobić 29'; Qurbanov 45+1', 83'; Jairo 70' (o.g.) | Stadium: Alinja Arena; Attendance: 1,500; Referee: Rahim Hasanov |

| 19 September 2016 5 | Gabala | 3 – 0 | AZAL | Qabala |
| 18:00 AZT (UTC+4) | Ozobić 31'; Qurbanov 56'; R.Huseynov 65' | Report | T.Hümbatov (yellow card) 41'; Amirjanov (yellow card) 54'; I.Alakbarov (yellow card) 79'; G.Magomedov (yellow card) 90+2' | Stadium: Gabala City Stadium; Attendance: 1,000; Referee: Ingilab Məmmədov |

| 22 September 2016 3 | Gabala | 2 – 0 | Sumgayit | Qabala |
| 17:00 AZT (UTC+4) | Dabo 85', 90'; Ozobić (yellow card) 90'; Santos (yellow card) 90+2' | Report | Y.Nabiyev (yellow card) 70' | Stadium: Gabala City Stadium; Attendance: 1,800; Referee: Rauf Jabbarov |

| 25 September 2016 6 | Zira | 0 – 2 | Gabala | Zirə |
| 18:00 AZT (UTC+4)AZT (UTC+4) | Naghiyev (yellow card) 66' | Report | Stanković (yellow card) 3'; Weeks 19', 76'; Mammadov (yellow card) 30'; Franjić (yellow card) 65' | Stadium: Zira Olympic Sport Complex Stadium; Attendance: 800; Referee: Ravan Həmzəzadə |

| 2 October 2016 7 | Gabala | 2 – 0 | Qarabağ | Qabala |
| 19:00 AZT (UTC+4) | Ozobić 11'; Dabo 14'; Stanković (yellow card) 33'; Jamalov (yellow card) 75'; Abbasov (yellow card) 76' | Report | Ndlovu (yellow card) 33'; Richard (yellow card) 77' | Stadium: Gabala City Stadium; Attendance: 3,000; Referee: Rahim Həsənov |

| 15 October 2016 8 | Inter Baku | 1 – 1 | Gabala | Baku |
| 16:00 AZT (UTC+4) | Ramazanov 48'; Abışov (yellow card) 50'; Hajiyev (yellow card) 60'; Qirtimov (yellow card) 61'; F.Bayramov (yellow card) 78' | Report | Ozobić (yellow card) 28'; Zenjov 69' | Stadium: Inter Arena; Attendance: 700; Referee: Ravan Həmzəzadə |

| 25 October 2016 9 | Sumgayit | 2 – 2 | Gabala | Sumqayit |
| 18:00 AZT (UTC+4) | B.Hasanalizade (yellow card) 34'; Malikov (yellow card) 40'; Y.Nabiyev 47'; Yunanov 90+4' (pen.) | Report | Stanković (yellow card) 58'; Eyyubov 64'; Qurbanov (yellow card) 68'; Ozobić 73'; S.Guliyev (yellow card) 81' (yellow-red card) 90+3'; Santos (yellow card) 83'; Mammadov (yellow card) 90+4' | Stadium: Kapital Bank Arena; Attendance: 1,250; Referee: Rahim Həsənov |

| 29 October 2016 10 | Gabala | 4 – 1 | Neftchi Baku | Qabala |
| 15:00 AZT (UTC+4) | Zenjov 11', 59'; Mammadov (yellow card) 34' (goal) 62'; Eyyubov 77'; Vernydub (yellow card) 90+1' | Report | A.Abdullayev 49' (yellow card) 74'; Castillo (yellow card) 53' | Stadium: Gabala City Stadium; Attendance: 1,500; Referee: Aliyar Aghayev |

| 6 November 2016 11 | AZAL | 0 – 0 | Gabala | Baku |
| 14:00 AZT (UTC+4) | K.Mirzayev (yellow card) 11'; Kvirtia (yellow card) 84'; R.Nasirli (yellow card) 85'; A.Mammadov (yellow card) 90'; Coronado (yellow card) 90+5' | Report | Qurbanov (yellow card) 52'; Jamalov (yellow card) 54' | Stadium: AZAL Arena; Attendance: 200; Referee: Ingilab Məmmədov |

| 19 November 2016 12 | Gabala | 1 – 0 | Zira | Qabala |
| 15:00 AZT (UTC+4) | Sadiqov (yellow card) 31'; Ozobić 52' | Report | Taghiyev (yellow card) 30'; Meza (yellow card) 31'; Mustafayev (yellow card) 47' | Stadium: Gabala City Stadium; Attendance: 500; Referee: Omar Paşayev |

| 29 November 2016 13 | Qarabağ | 2 – 1 | Gabala | Baku |
| 19:00 AZT (UTC+4) | Medvedev (yellow card) 74'; Richard 87' (pen.) (yellow card) 90+4' (red card) 90+4'; Quintana (yellow card) 90+2'; Ndlovu 90+4'; Šehić (yellow card) 90+4' | Report | Ozobić 64'; Qurbanov (yellow card) 72'; Ricardinho (yellow card) 90'; Abbasov (yellow card) 90+2' | Stadium: Azersun Arena; Attendance: 3,800; Referee: Rahim Həsənov |

| 17 December 2016 14 | Gabala | 2 – 1 | Kapaz | Qabala |
| 14:00 AZT (UTC+4) | Ozobić 23' (pen.); Santos (yellow card) 51'; Stanković (yellow card) 75'; Qurbanov 83' (pen.) | Report | Renan (yellow card) 22' (yellow-red card) 82'; T.Akhundov 77' (pen.) | Stadium: Gabala City Stadium; Attendance: 1,000; Referee: Aliyar Aghayev |

| 28 January 2017 15 | Gabala | 1 – 1 | Sumgayit | Qabala |
| 15:00 AZT (UTC+4) | Qurbanov (yellow card) 51'; Mutallimov (yellow card) 54'; Vernydub 58'; Abbasov (yellow card) 88' | Report | A.Salahli (yellow card) 13'; Gystarov (yellow card) 31'; N.Mukhtarov (yellow card) 51'; Kurbanov 53'; Hüseynov (yellow card) 81' | Stadium: Gabala City Stadium; Attendance: 1,000; Referee: Aliyar Aghayev |

| 3 February 2017 16 | Gabala | 1 – 0 | Neftchi Baku | Qabala |
| 17:00 AZT (UTC+4) | Stanković (yellow card) 39'; Sadiqov (yellow card) 47'; Abdullayev (yellow card) 57'; Subotić 77' (yellow card) 89' | Report | Abışov (yellow card) 76' | Stadium: Gabala City Stadium; Attendance: 1,200; Referee: Fariz Yusifov |

| 8 February 2017 17 | Gabala | 2 – 0 | AZAL | Qabala |
| 15:00 AZT (UTC+4) | Sadiqov (yellow card) 72'; Stanković (yellow card) 74'; Ozobić 64' (pen.), 90+3' (yellow card) 79'; Kvekveskiri (yellow card) 79' | Report | Roberts (yellow card) 3' (yellow-red card) 63'; E.Suleymanov (yellow card) 44'; Jafarguliyev (yellow card) 45'; A.Mammadov (yellow card) 75'; S.Mammadov (yellow card) 84' | Stadium: Gabala City Stadium; Attendance: 1,000; Referee: Ingilab Məmmədov |

| 12 February 2017 18 | Zira | 2 – 2 | Gabala | Zirə |
| 16:30 AZT (UTC+4) | V.Igbekoyi 53' (yellow card) 72'; T.Khalilzade (yellow card) 59'; Naghiyev (yellow card) 78'; Mustafayev (yellow card) 82'; Gadze 90+4' | Report | Subotić 37' (yellow card) 90+3'; Ramaldanov (yellow card) 57' (yellow-red card) 74'; Abbasov (yellow card) 66'; Ozobić 88' | Stadium: Zira Olympic Sport Complex Stadium; Attendance: 1,100; Referee: Aliyar Aghayev |

| 19 February 2017 19 | Gabala | 2 – 0 | Qarabağ | Qabala |
| 17:30 AZT (UTC+4) | Zenjov 30'; Kvekveskiri (yellow card) 58'; Ozobić 68' | Report | Míchel (yellow card) 36' | Stadium: Gabala City Stadium; Attendance: 4,500; Referee: Fariz Yusifov |

| 28 February 2017 20 | Kapaz | 1 – 1 | Gabala | Ganja |
| 15:00 AZT (UTC+4) | S.Rahimov 36'; N.Gurbanov (red card) 38'; Dário (yellow card) 85'; D.Karimi (yellow card) 90' | Report | Kvekveskiri (red card) 38'; Renan 54' (o.g.); Huseynov (yellow card) 64' | Stadium: Ganja City Stadium; Attendance: 5,000; Referee: Aliyar Aghayev |

| 4 March 2017 21 | Inter Baku | 0 – 2 | Gabala | Baku |
| 20:00 AZT (UTC+4) | Qirtimov (yellow card) 14'; Guliyev (yellow card) 51'; Fardjad-Azad (yellow card) 83' | Report | Ramaldanov (yellow card) 12'; Weeks (yellow card) 60'; Mutallimov 71'; Subotić 82' | Stadium: Inter Arena; Attendance: 2,500; Referee: Fariz Yusifov |

| 14 March 2017 22 | Neftchi Baku | 1 – 0 | Gabala | Baku |
| 20:00 AZT (UTC+4) | Alasgarov 40'; Petrov (yellow card) 67'; Bajković (yellow card) 89' | Report | Subotić (yellow card) 47' | Stadium: Bakcell Arena; Attendance: 1,100; Referee: Elvin Əsgərov |

| 19 March 2017 23 | AZAL | 1 – 1 | Gabala | Baku |
| 15:30 AZT (UTC+4) | T.Hümbatov (yellow card) 42'; Kvirtia (yellow card) 81' (goal) 90'; Tounkara (yellow card) 88' | Report | Weeks (yellow card) 16'; Mutallimov 52'; Kvekveskiri (yellow card) 90+2' | Stadium: AZAL Arena; Attendance: 300; Referee: Omar Paşayev |

| 2 April 2017 24 | Gabala | 1 – 1 | Zira | Qabala |
| 18:30 AZT (UTC+4) | Zenjov 8' | Report | Meza 61'; Mustafayev (yellow card) 65'; Nazirov (yellow card) 90+1' | Stadium: Gabala City Stadium; Attendance: 800; Referee: Ingilab Məmmədov |

| 9 April 2017 25 | Qarabağ | 0 – 0 | Gabala | Baku |
| 20:30 AZT (UTC+4) | Agolli (yellow card) 53' | Report | Abbasov (yellow card) 90'; Mutallimov (yellow card) 90+3' | Stadium: Tofiq Bahramov Republican Stadium; Attendance: 8,000; Referee: Fariz Yusifov |

| 16 April 2017 26 | Kapaz | 2 – 0 | Gabala | Ganja |
| 18:00 AZT (UTC+4) | Dário (yellow card) 21' (goal) 90+3'; Ebah 70'; V.Beybalayev (yellow card) 80' | Report | Ricardinho (yellow card) 41'; Ramaldanov (yellow card) 77' | Stadium: Ganja City Stadium; Attendance: 12,500; Referee: Omar Pashayev |

| 24 April 2017 27 | Gabala | 4 – 3 | Inter Baku | Qabala |
| 14:30 AZT (UTC+4) | Ricardinho 14'; Zenjov 26'; Scarlatache 33' (o.g.); Subotić (yellow card) 67'; Sadiqov (yellow card) 70'; Mutallimov 90+1' | Report | R.Aliyev 3', 78'; E.Abdullayev (yellow card) 72' | Stadium: Gabala City Stadium; Attendance: 1,600; Referee: Rauf Jabbarov |

| 29 April 2017 28 | Sumgayit | 2 – 1 | Gabala | Sumqayit |
| 18:00 AZT (UTC+4) | Yunanov 27' (yellow card) 38'; M.Abbasov 29' (yellow card) 88'; Malikov (yellow card) 78' | Report | Mammadov 40'; Q.Alıyev (yellow card) 90' | Stadium: Kapital Bank Arena; Attendance: 1,300; Referee: Ingilab Məmmədov |

==== League table ====
| Pos | Team | Pld | W | D | L | GF | GA | GD | Pts | Qualification or relegation |
|---|---|---|---|---|---|---|---|---|---|---|
| 1 | Qarabağ (C) | 28 | 19 | 5 | 4 | 46 | 14 | +32 | 62 | Qualification for the Champions League second qualifying round (Note: Qarabağ qualified for the Europa League second qualifying round by winning the 2016–17 Azerbaijan Cup. However, since they already qualified for European competition based on their league position, the spot awarded to the cup winners was passed down the league.) |
| 2 | Gabala | 28 | 14 | 10 | 4 | 48 | 21 | +27 | 52 | Qualification for the Europa League second qualifying round |
| 3 | Inter Baku | 28 | 11 | 10 | 7 | 39 | 33 | +6 | 43 | Qualification for the Europa League first qualifying round |
| 4 | Zira | 28 | 10 | 9 | 9 | 29 | 26 | +3 | 39 | Qualification for the Europa League first qualifying round |
| 5 | Kapaz | 28 | 9 | 9 | 10 | 24 | 27 | −3 | 36 | |

Source: PFL (in Azerbaijani), UEFA, Soccerway
Rules for classification: 1) Points; 2) Head-to-head points; 3) Head-to-head goal difference; 4) Head-to-head goals scored; 5) Head-to-head away goals scored (only if two teams); 6) Goal difference; 7) Goals scored.
(C) Champions

=== Azerbaijan Cup ===
| 3 December 2016 Second Round | Gabala | 2 – 2 (4–1 p) | Zagatala | Qabala |
| 15:00 AZT (UTC+4) | Stanković 12'; Eyyubov 45+2' (pen.); Kvekveskiri (yellow card) 60'; Jamalov (yellow card) 70'; Huseynov (yellow card) 71'; Santos (yellow card) 114'; Qurbanov (yellow card) 120' | Report | S.Abdullayev 32'; O.Balash 65' (yellow card) 109'; A.Agajanov (yellow card) 111' | Stadium: Gabala City Stadium; Attendance: 1,000; Referee: Rauf Cabbarov |
| | Penalties |
| | Ozobić (penalty scored); Stanković (penalty scored); Eyyubov (penalty scored); Qurbanov (penalty scored) | | O.Balash (penalty scored); V.Abdullayev (penalty missed); R.Tagizade (penalty missed) |

| 13 December 2016 Quarterfinal First Leg | Gabala | 2 – 1 | AZAL | Qabala |
| 15:00 AZT (UTC+4) | Ozobić 61'; Qurbanov 74' (yellow card) 90+1' | Report | Mirzaga Huseynpur 37'; Amirjanov (yellow card) 76' | Stadium: Gabala City Stadium; Attendance: 500; Referee: Fariz Yusifov |

| 21 December 2016 Quarterfinal Second Leg | AZAL | 0 – 1 (1 – 3 agg.) | Gabala | Baku |
| 16:00 AZT (UTC+4) | D.Janelidze (yellow card) 32'; K.Hüseynov (yellow card) 51'; K.Mirzayev (yellow card) 68'; E.Huseynov (yellow card) 87' | Report | Stanković (yellow card) 24'; Mammadov 53' | Stadium: AZAL Arena; Attendance: 250; Referee: Fariz Yusifov |

| 30 March 2017 Semifinal First Leg | Inter Baku | 1 – 3 | Gabala | Baku |
| 17:00 AZT (UTC+4) | E.Abdullayev (yellow card) 13'; Scarlatache 18'; M.Guliyev (yellow card) 34'; O.Sadigli (yellow card) 87' | Report | Subotić 14' (pen.), 47'; Ozobić 88' (pen.); Santos (yellow card) 90+3' | Stadium: Inter Arena; Attendance: 500; Referee: Elvin Asgərov |

| 5 April 2017 Semifinal Second Leg | Gabala | 2 – 0 (5 – 1 agg.) | Inter Baku | Qabala |
| 16:30 AZT (UTC+4) | Subotić 12'; Dabo 33' | Report | E.Abdullayev (yellow card) 54' | Stadium: Gabala City Stadium; Attendance: 1,800; Referee: Omar Pashayev |

==== Final ====
| 5 May 2017 | Qarabağ | 2 – 0 | Gabala | Nakhchivan |
| 16:00 AZT (UTC+4) | Madatov (yellow card) 28' (goal) 52'; Abbasov 68' (o.g.) | Report | Stanković (yellow card) 79' | Stadium: Nakhchivan City Stadium; Attendance: 12,800; Referee: Fariz Yusifov |

=== UEFA Europa League ===
==== Qualifying rounds ====
| 30 June 2016 First qualifying round 1st leg | Gabala (Azerbaijan) | 5 – 1 | (Georgia (country)) Samtredia | Baku, Azerbaijan |
| 20:00 AZT (UTC+4) | Stanković 16'; Zenjov 19' (yellow card) 65'; Weeks 30', 69', 72' (yellow card) 69' | Report | T.Markozashvili (yellow card) 44'; L.Shergelashvili 59'; D.Jikia (yellow card) 63' | Stadium: Bakcell Arena; Attendance: 5,850; Referee: Denis Scherbakov (Belarus) |

| 7 July 2016 First qualifying round 2nd leg | Samtredia (Georgia (country)) | 2 – 1 (3 – 6 agg.) | (Azerbaijan) Gabala | Zestaponi,, Georgia |
| 19:00 AZT (UTC+4) | Zivzivadze 14' (pen.); Mchedlishvili (yellow card) 30'; Shergelashvili 90+2'; Mandzhgaladze (yellow card) 90+3' | Report | Vernydub (yellow card) 25'; Weeks 42'; Mutallimov (yellow card) 81' | Stadium: David Abashidze Stadium; Attendance: 847; Referee: Georgios Kyzas (Greece) |

| 14 July 2016 Second qualifying round 1st leg | MTK Budapest (Hungary) | 1 – 2 | (Azerbaijan) Gabala | Győr, Hungary |
| 22:30 AZT (UTC+4) | Gera (yellow card) 26'; Bese (yellow card) 40'; Torghelle 70' | Report | Kvekveskiri 25'; Stanković (yellow card) 49'; Ozobić 63' | Stadium: Ménfői út, Attendance: 501; Referee: Bojan Pandžić (Sweden) |

| 21 July 2016 Second qualifying round 2nd leg | Gabala (Azerbaijan) | 2 – 0 (4 – 1 agg.) | (Hungary) MTK Budapest | Baku, Azerbaijan |
| 21:00 AZT (UTC+4) | Zenjov 7'; Stanković (yellow card) 15'; Weeks 37' | Report | Baki (yellow card) 36'; Grgić (yellow card) 85' | Stadium: Bakcell Arena; Attendance: 5,550; Referee: Mete Kalkavan (Turkey) |

| 28 July 2016 Third qualifying round 1st leg | Lille (France) | 1 – 1 | (Azerbaijan) Gabala | Villeneuve-d'Ascq, France |
| 21:00 AZT (UTC+4) | Corchia (yellow card) 43'; Mendes 47' | Report | Vernydub 13'; Ozobić (yellow card) 42'; Kvekveskiri (yellow card) 44' | Stadium: Stadium Lille Métropole; Attendance: 8,265; Referee: Daniel Stefański (Poland) |

| 4 August 2016 Third qualifying round 2nd leg | Gabala (Azerbaijan) | 1 – 0 (2 – 1 agg.) | (France) Lille | Baku, Azerbaijan |
| 21:00 AZT (UTC+4) | Ozobić 34'; Kvekveskiri (yellow card) 44'; Mammadov (yellow card) 90+4' | Report | Amalfitano (yellow card) 26'; Sankharé (yellow card) 88' | Stadium: Bakcell Arena; Attendance: 10,550; Referee: Aleksei Eskov (Russia) |

| 18 August 2016 Playoff round 1st leg | Gabala (Azerbaijan) | 3 – 1 | (Slovenia) NK Maribor | Baku, Azerbaijan |
| 21:00 AZT (UTC+4) | Zenjov 38'; Dabo 51', 52' | Report | Tavares 18'; Šuler (yellow card) 30'; Vrhovec (yellow card) 59' | Stadium: Bakcell Arena; Attendance: 4,723; Referee: Aleksei Kulbakov (Belarus) |

| 25 August 2016 Playoff round 2nd leg | NK Maribor (Slovenia) | 1 – 0 (2 – 3 agg.) | (Azerbaijan) Gabala | Maribor, Slovenia |
| 22:15 AZT (UTC+4) | Janža (yellow card) 49'; Pihler (yellow card) 60'; Šme (yellow card) 65'; Tavares 66'; Kabha (yellow card) 7' | Report | Vernydub (yellow card) 37'; Weeks (red card) 70'; Mammadov (yellow card) 88'; Ozobić (yellow card) 89' | Stadium: Ljudski vrt Attendance: 9,000; Referee: Viktor Kassai (Hungary) |

==== Group stage ====
| Pos | Team | Pld | W | D | L | GF | GA | GD | Pts | Qualification | SET | AND | MNZ | QAB |
|---|---|---|---|---|---|---|---|---|---|---|---|---|---|---|
| 1 | (France) Saint-Étienne | 6 | 3 | 3 | 0 | 8 | 5 | +3 | 12 | Advance to knockout phase | — | 1–1 | 0–0 | 1–0 |
| 2 | (Belgium) Anderlecht | 6 | 3 | 2 | 1 | 16 | 8 | +8 | 11 | Advance to knockout phase | 2–3 | — | 6–1 | 3–1 |
| 3 | (Germany) Mainz 05 | 6 | 2 | 3 | 1 | 8 | 10 | −2 | 9 | | 1–1 | 1–1 | — | 2–0 |
| 4 | (Azerbaijan) Gabala | 6 | 0 | 0 | 6 | 5 | 14 | −9 | 0 | | 1–2 | 1–3 | 2–3 | — |

Source: UEFA

| 15 September 2016 1 | Anderlecht (Belgium) | 3 – 1 | (Azerbaijan) Gabala | Anderlecht, Belgium |
| 21:00 AZT (UTC+4) | Teodorczyk 14'; Rafael 41' (o.g.); Spajić (yellow card) 56'; Capel 77' | Report | Dabo 20'; Ricardinho (yellow card) 81'; Mammadov (yellow card) 84' | Stadium: Constant Vanden Stock Stadium; Attendance: 11,638; Referee: Harald Lechner (Austria) |

| 29 September 2016 2 | Gabala (Azerbaijan) | 2 – 3 | (Germany) Mainz 05 | Baku, Azerbaijan |
| 19:00 AZT (UTC+4) | Ozobić (yellow card) 47'; Qurbanov 57' (pen.); Zenjov 62' (yellow card) 69'; Vernydub (yellow card) 78'; Stanković (yellow card) 90' | Report | Hack (yellow card) 14'; Muto 41'; Lössl (yellow card) 56'; Córdoba 68'; Öztunalı 78' (yellow card) 87' | Stadium: Bakcell Arena; Referee: Gediminas Mažeika (Lithuania) |

| 20 October 2016 3 | Saint-Étienne (France) | 1 – 0 | (Azerbaijan) Gabala | Saint-Étienne, France |
| 23:05 AZT (UTC+4) | Théophile-Catherine (yellow card) 51'; Ricardinho 70' (o.g.); M'Bengue (yellow card) 82' | Report | Vernydub (yellow card) 58' | Stadium: Stade Geoffroy-Guichard; Attendance: 22,855; Referee: Ali Palabıyık (Turkey) |

| 3 November 2016 4 | Gabala (Azerbaijan) | 1 – 2 | (France) Saint-Étienne | Baku, Azerbaijan |
| 22:00 AZT (UTC+4) | Qurbanov (yellow card) 33' (goal) 39'; Mirzabekov (yellow card) 90+3' | Report | Pogba (yellow card) 28'; Tannane 45+1'; Berić 53' | Stadium: Bakcell Arena; Attendance: 5,600; Referee: Carlos del Cerro Grande (Spain) |

| 24 November 2016 5 | Gabala (Azerbaijan) | 1 – 3 | (Belgium) Anderlecht | Baku, Azerbaijan |
| 20:00 AZT (UTC+4) | Ricardinho 15' (pen.); Eyyubov (yellow card) 63' (yellow-red card) 88' | Report | Tielemans 11'; Adjei (yellow card) 28'; Dendoncker (yellow card) 42'; Boeckx (yellow card) 72'; Bruno 90'; Teodorczyk 90+4' | Stadium: Bakcell Arena; Attendance: 4,500; Referee: Yevhen Aranovsky (Ukraine) |

| 8 December 2016 6 | Mainz 05 (Germany) | 2 – 0 | (Azerbaijan) Gabala | Mainz, Germany |
| 22:00 AZT (UTC+4) | Hack 30'; De Blasis 40'; Bussmann (yellow card) 66'; Jairo (yellow card) 76' | Report | | Stadium: Opel Arena; Referee: Simon Evans (Wales) |

== Squad statistics ==
As of Match played 5 May 2017

=== Appearances and goals ===
| No. | Pos | Nat | Player | Total | | Premier League | | Azerbaijan Cup | | Europa League | |
| No. | Pos | Nat | Player | Apps | Goals | Apps | Goals | Apps | Goals | Apps | Goals |
|---|---|---|---|---|---|---|---|---|---|---|---|
| 3 | DF | (Serbia) SRB | Vojislav Stanković | 41 | 2 | 22 | 0 | 6 | 1 | 13 | 1 |
| 4 | MF | (Azerbaijan) AZE | Elvin Jamalov | 21 | 0 | 12+2 | 0 | 1+1 | 0 | 0+5 | 0 |
| 5 | DF | (Azerbaijan) AZE | Rasim Ramaldanov | 7 | 0 | 6 | 0 | 1 | 0 | 0 | 0 |
| 6 | MF | (Azerbaijan) AZE | Rashad Sadiqov | 35 | 0 | 17+4 | 0 | 4 | 0 | 10 | 0 |
| 7 | MF | (Georgia (country)) GEO | Nika Kvekveskiri | 29 | 1 | 13+1 | 0 | 3+1 | 0 | 10+1 | 1 |
| 8 | MF | (Azerbaijan) AZE | Qismət Alıyev | 6 | 0 | 2+1 | 0 | 1+1 | 0 | 0+1 | 0 |
| 9 | FW | (Estonia) EST | Sergei Zenjov | 39 | 10 | 14+8 | 6 | 3+1 | 0 | 13 | 4 |
| 10 | FW | (Azerbaijan) AZE | Ruslan Qurbanov | 30 | 7 | 14+7 | 4 | 3 | 1 | 4+2 | 2 |
| 11 | MF | (Azerbaijan) AZE | Asif Mammadov | 36 | 3 | 17+3 | 2 | 4 | 1 | 3+9 | 0 |
| 13 | DF | (Azerbaijan) AZE | Murad Musayev | 4 | 0 | 2+2 | 0 | 0 | 0 | 0 | 0 |
| 14 | MF | (Azerbaijan) AZE | Javid Huseynov | 21 | 0 | 10+6 | 0 | 2+3 | 0 | 0 | 0 |
| 15 | DF | (Ukraine) UKR | Vitaliy Vernydub | 31 | 3 | 14 | 2 | 2+1 | 0 | 14 | 1 |
| 17 | DF | (Azerbaijan) AZE | Magomed Mirzabekov | 33 | 0 | 14+7 | 0 | 0+2 | 0 | 10 | 0 |
| 18 | FW | (France) FRA | Bagaliy Dabo | 29 | 11 | 10+6 | 7 | 1+1 | 1 | 11 | 3 |
| 19 | MF | (Croatia) CRO | Filip Ozobić | 45 | 15 | 26+1 | 11 | 3+1 | 2 | 14 | 2 |
| 20 | DF | (Brazil) BRA | Ricardinho | 25 | 2 | 10 | 1 | 1 | 0 | 14 | 1 |
| 21 | FW | (Azerbaijan) AZE | Roman Huseynov | 10 | 1 | 2+4 | 1 | 1+2 | 0 | 0+1 | 0 |
| 22 | GK | (Ukraine) UKR | Dmytro Bezotosnyi | 46 | 0 | 27 | 0 | 5 | 0 | 14 | 0 |
| 26 | MF | (Azerbaijan) AZE | Ülvi İbazadə | 1 | 0 | 1 | 0 | 0 | 0 | 0 | 0 |
| 27 | MF | (Liberia) LBR | Theo Weeks | 33 | 7 | 11+5 | 2 | 5 | 0 | 12 | 5 |
| 31 | FW | (Switzerland) SUI | Danijel Subotić | 13 | 6 | 7+4 | 3 | 2 | 3 | 0 | 0 |
| 32 | FW | (Azerbaijan) AZE | Rashad Eyyubov | 19 | 3 | 6+1 | 2 | 3+1 | 1 | 2+6 | 0 |
| 33 | GK | (Poland) POL | Dawid Pietrzkiewicz | 2 | 0 | 1 | 0 | 1 | 0 | 0 | 0 |
| 34 | DF | (Azerbaijan) AZE | Urfan Abbasov | 31 | 0 | 18+2 | 0 | 5+1 | 0 | 5 | 0 |
| 44 | DF | (Brazil) BRA | Rafael Santos | 20 | 0 | 8+1 | 0 | 3 | 0 | 5+3 | 0 |
| 70 | MF | (Azerbaijan) AZE | Farid Nabiyev | 2 | 0 | 0+1 | 0 | 0+1 | 0 | 0 | 0 |
| 77 | MF | (Azerbaijan) AZE | Araz Abdullayev | 11 | 0 | 7+2 | 0 | 1+1 | 0 | 0 | 0 |
| 88 | MF | (Azerbaijan) AZE | Tellur Mutallimov | 22 | 4 | 14+3 | 4 | 3 | 0 | 0+2 | 0 |
| 90 | FW | (Ukraine) UKR | Ramil Hasanov | 2 | 0 | 0+1 | 0 | 0+1 | 0 | 0 | 0 |
Players away from Gabala on loan:
Players who left Gabala during the season:
| 30 | MF | (Croatia) CRO | Petar Franjić | 9 | 0 | 2+2 | 0 | 1 | 0 | 0+4 | 0 |
| 39 | DF | (Azerbaijan) AZE | Sadig Guliyev | 1 | 0 | 0+1 | 0 | 0 | 0 | 0 | 0 |

=== Goal scorers ===
| Place | Position | Nation | Number | Name | Premier League | Azerbaijan Cup | Europa League | Total |
|---|---|---|---|---|---|---|---|---|
| 1 | MF | (Croatia) | 19 | Filip Ozobić | 11 | 2 | 2 | 15 |
| 2 | FW | (France) | 18 | Bagaliy Dabo | 7 | 1 | 3 | 11 |
| 3 | FW | (Estonia) | 9 | Sergei Zenjov | 6 | 0 | 4 | 10 |
| 4 | FW | (Azerbaijan) | 10 | Ruslan Qurbanov | 4 | 1 | 2 | 7 |
| 4 | MF | (Liberia) | 27 | Theo Weeks | 2 | 0 | 5 | 7 |
| 6 | FW | (Switzerland) | 31 | Danijel Subotić | 3 | 3 | 0 | 6 |
| 7 | MF | (Azerbaijan) | 88 | Tellur Mutallimov | 4 | 0 | 0 | 4 |
| 8 | FW | (Azerbaijan) | 32 | Rashad Eyyubov | 2 | 1 | 0 | 3 |
| 8 | MF | (Azerbaijan) | 11 | Asif Mammadov | 2 | 1 | 0 | 3 |
| 8 | DF | (Ukraine) | 15 | Vitaliy Vernydub | 2 | 0 | 1 | 3 |
| 8 | | | | Own goal | 3 | 0 | 0 | 3 |
| 12 | DF | (Serbia) | 3 | Vojislav Stanković | 0 | 1 | 1 | 2 |
| 12 | DF | (Brazil) | 20 | Ricardinho | 1 | 0 | 1 | 2 |
| 13 | FW | (Azerbaijan) | 21 | Roman Huseynov | 1 | 0 | 0 | 1 |
| 13 | MF | (Georgia (country)) | 7 | Nika Kvekveskiri | 0 | 0 | 1 | 1 |
| | | | | TOTALS | 48 | 10 | 20 | 78 |

=== Disciplinary record ===
| Number | Nation | Position | Name | Premier League | | Azerbaijan Cup | | Europa League | | Total | |
| Number | Nation | Position | Name | Yellow card | Red card | Yellow card | Red card | Yellow card | Red card | Yellow card | Red card |
| 3 | (Serbia) | DF | Vojislav Stanković | 6 | 0 | 2 | 0 | 3 | 0 | 11 | 0 |
| 4 | (Azerbaijan) | MF | Elvin Jamalov | 3 | 0 | 1 | 0 | 0 | 0 | 4 | 0 |
| 5 | (Azerbaijan) | DF | Rasim Ramaldanov | 4 | 1 | 0 | 0 | 0 | 0 | 4 | 1 |
| 6 | (Azerbaijan) | MF | Rashad Sadiqov | 4 | 0 | 0 | 0 | 0 | 0 | 4 | 0 |
| 7 | (Georgia (country)) | MF | Nika Kvekveskiri | 3 | 1 | 1 | 0 | 2 | 0 | 6 | 1 |
| 8 | (Azerbaijan) | MF | Qismət Alıyev | 1 | 0 | 0 | 0 | 0 | 0 | 1 | 0 |
| 9 | (Estonia) | FW | Sergei Zenjov | 1 | 0 | 0 | 0 | 2 | 0 | 3 | 0 |
| 10 | (Azerbaijan) | FW | Ruslan Qurbanov | 4 | 0 | 2 | 0 | 1 | 0 | 7 | 0 |
| 11 | (Azerbaijan) | MF | Asif Mammadov | 3 | 0 | 0 | 0 | 3 | 0 | 6 | 0 |
| 14 | (Azerbaijan) | MF | Javid Huseynov | 1 | 0 | 1 | 0 | 0 | 0 | 2 | 0 |
| 15 | (Ukraine) | DF | Vitaliy Vernydub | 1 | 0 | 0 | 0 | 4 | 0 | 5 | 0 |
| 17 | (Azerbaijan) | DF | Magomed Mirzabekov | 0 | 0 | 0 | 0 | 1 | 0 | 1 | 0 |
| 19 | (Croatia) | MF | Filip Ozobić | 3 | 0 | 0 | 0 | 3 | 0 | 6 | 0 |
| 20 | (Brazil) | DF | Ricardinho | 2 | 0 | 0 | 0 | 1 | 0 | 3 | 0 |
| 27 | (Liberia) | MF | Theo Weeks | 3 | 0 | 0 | 0 | 1 | 1 | 4 | 1 |
| 31 | (Switzerland) | FW | Danijel Subotić | 4 | 0 | 0 | 0 | 0 | 0 | 4 | 0 |
| 32 | (Azerbaijan) | FW | Rashad Eyyubov | 0 | 0 | 0 | 0 | 2 | 1 | 2 | 1 |
| 34 | (Azerbaijan) | DF | Urfan Abbasov | 7 | 0 | 0 | 0 | 0 | 0 | 7 | 0 |
| 39 | (Azerbaijan) | DF | Sadig Guliyev | 2 | 1 | 0 | 0 | 0 | 0 | 2 | 1 |
| 44 | (Brazil) | DF | Rafael Santos | 4 | 0 | 2 | 0 | 0 | 0 | 6 | 0 |
| 77 | (Azerbaijan) | MF | Araz Abdullayev | 1 | 0 | 0 | 0 | 0 | 0 | 1 | 0 |
| 88 | (Azerbaijan) | MF | Tellur Mutallimov | 3 | 0 | 0 | 0 | 1 | 0 | 4 | 0 |
Players who left Gabala during the season:
| 30 | (Croatia) | MF | Petar Franjić | 1 | 0 | 0 | 0 | 1 | 1 | 2 | 1 |
| | | | TOTALS | 61 | 3 | 9 | 0 | 24 | 2 | 94 | 5 |

== Notes ==
1. Gabala will play their home matches at Bakcell Arena, Baku instead of their regular stadium, City Stadium, Qabala.
2. Samtredia will play their home match at David Abashidze Stadium, Zestaponi, instead of their regular stadium Erosi Manjgaladze Stadium, Samtredia.
3. MTK Budapest play their home matches at Ménfői út, Győr, instead of their temporary stadium Stadion Rudolf Illovszky, Budapest.
4. Lille will play their home match at Stadium Lille Métropole, Villeneuve-d'Ascq, instead of their regular stadium Stade Pierre-Mauroy, Villeneuve-d'Ascq.
