= Petar Franjić =

Croatian footballer

Personal information
- Full name: Petar Franjić
- Date of birth: 21 August 1991 (age 35)
- Place of birth: Zagreb, Croatia
- Height: 1.78 m (5 ft 10 in)
- Position: Winger

Team information
- Current team: NK Ravnice

Youth career
- 1998–2007: Croatia Sesvete
- 2007–2009: Dinamo Zagreb

Senior career*
Years	Team	Apps	(Gls)
2010	Lokomotiva	3	(0)
2010	→ Radnik Sesvete (loan)	12	(0)
2011–2014	Dinamo Zagreb	0	(0)
2011–2013	→ Radnik Sesvete (loan)	47	(9)
2013	→ Istra 1961 (loan)	17	(5)
2014–2015	Istra 1961	23	(3)
2015–2016	RNK Split	23	(2)
2016	Gabala	4	(0)
2017–2018	Domžale	30	(7)
2018–2020	Široki Brijeg	22	(3)
2020	Radnik Sesvete	3	(0)
2021	Zagorec		
2021-	NK Ravnice		
- * Club domestic league appearances and goals as of 24 July 2022

Petar Franjić (born 21 August 1991) is a Croatian footballer who plays as a midfielder for NK Ravnice.

== Club career ==
Franjić started his football career at the age of 7, playing for Croatia Sesvete. There he passed through all their youth categories. In 2007, he was transferred to Dinamo Zagreb. He played there in the cadets and juniors sections. In January 2010 he was moved to Dinamo Zagreb's affiliated club, Lokomotiva, where he played in the senior team, along with some other Dinamo's youngsters, in order to gain some experience in the Croatian top football league, Prva HNL.

His first official appearance for Lokomotiva's was on 25 February at Maksimir Stadium, when he replaced Nino Bule. At the end of the season he was moved further down the rank, on loan from Lokomotiva to another affiliated club, Radnik Sesvete, in the Treća HNL Zapad.

His games earned him a professional contract back at Dinamo after six months, in January 2011, but he was again moved to Radnik where he spent the rest of the season. He, then, spent two further years on loan at Radnik, playing in the Druga HNL, before he was sent on loan to the Prva HNL team NK Istra 1961 in July 2013. A year after he signed a professional contract with the club from Pula and played a significant role in Istra team.

After several months of not receiving wages in Istra, he left the club and joined another Prva liga side RNK Split in summer 2015. His most memorable performance during his time in Split was the match against his former club Dinamo on 30 October 2015, when he scored the winning goal in a 1–0 victory. Nearly a year later, Franjić had similar problems with payment and he decided to search for a new club.

On 31 August 2016, Franjić signed a two-year contract with Azerbaijan Premier League side Gabala.

On 23 January 2017, he signed a two-and-a-half-year contract with Slovenian team Domžale. In 2018, Franjić joined Široki Brijeg. He left Široki Brijeg on 1 June 2020 after his contract with the club expired.

== Career statistics ==
=== Club ===
As of match played on 3 December 2016.

Appearances and goals by club, season and competition
Club	Season	League			National Cup		Continental		Other		Total	
Club	Season	Division	Apps	Goals	Apps	Goals	Apps	Goals	Apps	Goals	Apps	Goals
Istra 1961	2013–14 (loan)	Prva HNL	17	5	3	0	—		—		20	5
Istra 1961	2014–15	Prva HNL	19	0	0	0	—		—		19	0
Istra 1961	2015–16	Prva HNL	4	3	0	0	—		—		4	3
Istra 1961	Total		23	3	0	0	—		—		23	3
RNK Split	2015–16	Prva HNL	23	2	0	0	—		—		23	2
Gabala	2016–17	Azerbaijan Premier League	4	0	1	0	4	0	—		9	0
Career total			67	10	4	0	4	0	—		75	10
