= Theo Lewis Weeks =

Liberian footballer (born 1990)

Theo Weeks
Personal information
- Full name: Theo-Lewis Weeks
- Date of birth: January 19, 1990 (age 36)
- Place of birth: Montserrado, Liberia
- Height: 1.73 m (5 ft 8 in)
- Position: Midfielder

Team information
- Current team: Omonia Aradippou

Senior career*
Years	Team	Apps	(Gls)
2007	Watanga		
2008–2010	Ankaraspor	24	(0)
2009–2010	→ Ankaragücü (loan)	7	(0)
2010–2012	Ankaragücü	24	(1)
2011	→ Çaykur Rizespor (loan)	8	(0)
2012–2013	Göztepe	37	(0)
2013–2015	Maritimo	35	(5)
2015–2018	Ermis Aradippou	37	(3)
2016–2017	→ Gabala (loan)	16	(2)
2018	Al Ansar	4	(0)
2018–2019	Mirbat	8	(1)
2019	Alki Oroklini	2	(0)
2019	Karmiotissa	7	(0)
2020–	Omonia Aradippou	8	(0)

International career^{‡}
2008–	Liberia	25	(1)
Medal record
10 May 2017
- * Club domestic league appearances and goals as of 20 March 2017 ‡ National team caps and goals as of 31 March 2019

Theo Lewis Weeks (born 19 January 1990) is a Liberian international footballer who plays as a midfielder for Omonia Aradippou.

== Club career ==
On 14 June 2016, Weeks signed a year-long loan deal with Azerbaijan Premier League side Gabala FK.

On 3 January 2018, Weeks signed for Lebanese Premier League club Ansar on a six-month contract. He was the first and only Liberian player to appear for Ansar in the Lebanese Premier League

Karmiotissa FC announced on 20 June 2019, that Lewis had joined the club. He then moved to Cypriot Second Division club Omonia Aradippou in January 2020.

== Career statistics ==
=== Club ===
As of match played 19 November 2017

Appearances and goals by club, season and competition
Club	Season	League			National Cup		League Cup		Continental		Other		Total	
Club	Season	Division	Apps	Goals	Apps	Goals	Apps	Goals	Apps	Goals	Apps	Goals	Apps	Goals
Osmanlıspor	2008–09	Süper Lig	24	0	6	0	–		–		–		30	0
MKE Ankaragücü (loan)	2009–10	Süper Lig	7	0	4	0	–		–		–		11	0
MKE Ankaragücü	2010–11	Süper Lig	11	0	2	0	–		–		–		12	0
MKE Ankaragücü	2011–12	Süper Lig	13	1	0	0	–		–		–		13	1
MKE Ankaragücü	Total		24	1	1	0	-	-	-	-	-	-	25	1
Çaykur Rizespor (loan)	2010–11	TFF First League	8	0	0	0	–		–		1	0	9	0
Göztepe	2011–12	TFF First League	15	0	0	0	–		–		–		15	0
Göztepe	2012–13	TFF First League	22	0	3	0	–		–		–		25	0
Göztepe	Total		37	0	3	0	-	-	-	-	-	-	40	0
Marítimo	2013–14	Primeira Liga	19	3	1	0	3	0	–		–		23	3
Marítimo	2014–15	Primeira Liga	16	2	2	0	1	0	–		–		19	2
Marítimo	Total		35	5	3	0	4	0	-	-	-	-	42	5
Ermis Aradippou	2015–16	Primeira Liga	27	2	2	0	–		–		–		29	2
Ermis Aradippou	2016–17	Primeira Liga	0	0	0	0	0	0	–		–		0	0
Ermis Aradippou	2017–18	Primeira Liga	10	1	0	0	0	0	–		–		10	1
Ermis Aradippou	Total		37	3	2	0	-	-	-	-	-	-	39	2
Gabala (loan)	2016–17	Azerbaijan Premier League	16	2	5	0	–		12	5	–		33	7
Al-Ansar	2017–18	Lebanese Premier League	1	0	0	0	–		–		–		1	0
Career total			189	11	25	0	4	0	12	5	1	0	231	16

=== International ===
Liberia national team
Year	Apps	Goals
2006	2	0
2007	0	0
2008	7	0
2009	0	0
2010	2	1
2011	0	0
2012	6	0
2013	3	0
2014	0	0
2015	1	0
2016	4	0
Total	25	1

Statistics accurate as of match played 4 September 2016

=== International goals ===
As of 12 November 2015

#	Date	Venue	Opponent	Score	Result	Competition	Ref
1.	9 October 2010	Stade Modibo Kéïta, Bamako, Mali	Mali	1–1	1–2	2012 Africa Cup of Nations qualification	
