= Nika Kvekveskiri =

Georgian footballer (born 1992)

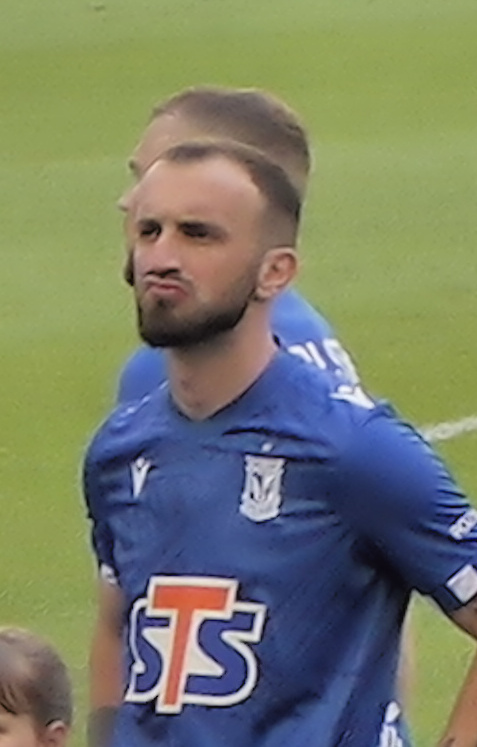
- Kvekveskiri with Lech Poznań in 2022

Personal information
- Full name: Nikoloz Kvekveskiri
- Date of birth: 29 May 1992 (age 34)
- Place of birth: Zugdidi, Georgia
- Height: 1.86 m (6 ft 1 in)
- Position: Defensive midfielder

Team information
- Current team: Georgia (assistant)

Youth career
- 2007–2009: Baia Zugdidi

Senior career*
Years	Team	Apps	(Gls)
2009–2010	Baia Zugdidi	36	(1)
2011–2014	Dinamo Tbilisi	58	(2)
2012–2014	Dinamo Tbilisi II	28	(13)
2013	→ Tskhinvali (loan)	11	(1)
2014–2015	Dila Gori	27	(7)
2015–2016	Inter Baku	29	(4)
2016–2017	Gabala	14	(0)
2017–2020	Tobol	75	(5)
2021–2024	Lech Poznań	91	(5)
2024–2025	Nyíregyháza	17	(1)
Total		386	(39)

International career
2008–2009	Georgia U17	5	(0)
2009–2011	Georgia U19	6	(0)
2009–2014	Georgia U21	20	(2)
2015–2025	Georgia	62	(0)
- * Club domestic league appearances and goals

Nikoloz "Nika" Kvekveskiri^{(Order of Honor)} (Georgian: ნიკოლოზ "ნიკა" კვეკვესკირი, romanized: nik'oloz "nik'a" k'vek'vesk'iri, pronounced [nikʼoloz nikʼa kʼʷekʼʷeskʼiɾi], Polish: Nikoloz „Nika” Kwekweskiri; born 29 May 1992), nicknamed Kvekve, is a Georgian former professional footballer who currently works for the Georgia national team as an assistant coach.

The family of Kvekveskiri comes from the Gali district of Abkhazia. They had to flee the 1992–93 war and move to a refugee settlement in Zugdidi, where Nika grew up under tough living conditions.

He played in four countries and won champion's titles three times.

Kvekvesriki was regularly called up to national youth teams. Before announcing retirement from the senior team in 2025, he was the vice-captain.

== Club career ==
Kvekveskiri started his career in the local club Baia Zugdidi. He made his debut for the first team on 15 August 2009 in a match against FC Locomotive Tbilisi. His first top-league goal scored against Kolkheti 1913 turned out a hard-fought winner on 29 September 2010.

The next year, Kvekveskiri joined Georgian champions Dinamo Tbilisi. During the initial year-and-a-half period he made fifty league appearances for the team and won the double. On 30 June 2011, Kvekveskiri scored his first European goal in a UEFA Europa League 2–0 win over Milsami.

In 2013, he was on loan to Tskhinvali for a half season and in June 2014 he was sold to Dila Gori. With seven league goals netted this year for Dila, Kvekveskiri was a key member of this title-winning team.

Following this season, in 2015 he moved to Azerbaijani Inter Baku. In June 2016, he joined Gabala.

In May 2017, Kvekvesikiri signed a two-year deal with Tobol. On 20 January 2021, Tobol announced that he had left the club.

In January 2021, he moved to Ekstraklasa side Lech Poznań till the end of the 2020–21 season. He signed a two-year extension on 29 April 2021, renewed next October until 30 June 2025. On 10 July 2024, he left the club by mutual consent. During his three-and-a-half-year stay, Kvekveskiri made a total of 123 appearances across all competitions, recording six goals and six assists. He contributed to the club's eighth league title in 2022, as well as reaching the quarter-finals of the UEFA Europa Conference League the following year.

In early September 2024, Kvekveskiri joined newly promoted Hungarian NB I side Nyíregyháza Spartacus on a season-long deal.

== International career ==
With twenty appearances made for U21s in UEFA competitive matches, Kvekveskiri is the most capped Georgian player. He took part in three qualifying campaigns from 2009 to 2015.

Kvekveskiri made his international debut for the senior team on 8 October 2015 in a 4–0 win against Gibraltar for the Euro 2016 qualifiers.

He was a regular member of the team that produced an eleven-game unbeaten record between October 2021 and November 2022.

On 26 March 2024, Kvekveskiri scored the winning penalty against Greece to send Georgia to the UEFA Euro 2024, their first international tournament in history. In May 2024, he was selected in the team's squad for UEFA Euro 2024. He made his sole appearance at the tournament as a second-half substitute in a 1–4 loss to Spain in the round of 16.

== Coaching career ==
On 29 August 2025, Kvekveskiri announced his retirement at the age of 33. In a press conference held along with the national team coach Willy Sagnol, Kvekveskiri stated that he would join Sagnol's coaching staff as his assistant.

== Personal life ==
Kvekveskiri is married to Salome Bebua, also a refugee from Abkhazia. The couple raises two daughters.

== Career statistics ==
=== Club ===
Appearances and goals by club, season and competition
Club	Season	League			National cup (Note: Includes Georgian Cup, Azerbaijan Cup, Kazakhstan Cup, Polish Cup, Magyar Kupa)		Continental		Other		Total	
Club	Season	Division	Apps	Goals	Apps	Goals	Apps	Goals	Apps	Goals	Apps	Goals
Baia Zugdidi	2009–10	Umaglesi Liga	22	0	4	3	—		—		26	3
Baia Zugdidi	2010–11	Umaglesi Liga	14	1	1	0	—		—		15	1
Baia Zugdidi	Total		36	1	5	3	—		—		41	4
Dinamo Tbilisi	2010–11	Umaglesi Liga	17	0	0	0	0	0	—		17	0
Dinamo Tbilisi	2011–12	Umaglesi Liga	33	2	2	0	7 (Note: Appearances in UEFA Europa League)	1	—		42	3
Dinamo Tbilisi	2012–13	Umaglesi Liga	8	0	1	0	—		—		9	0
Dinamo Tbilisi	2013–14	Umaglesi Liga	0	0	0	0	0	0	—		0	0
Dinamo Tbilisi	Total		58	2	3	0	7	1	—		68	3
Dinamo Tbilisi-2	2012–13	Pirveli Liga	17	10	—		—		—		17	10
Dinamo Tbilisi-2	2013–14	Pirveli Liga	11	3	—		—		—		11	3
Dinamo Tbilisi-2	Total		28	13	0	0	0	0	0	0	28	13
Tskhinvali (loan)	2013–14	Umaglesi Liga	11	1	3	0	—		—		14	1
Dila Gori	2014–15	Umaglesi Liga	27	7	5	0	—		—		32	7
Inter Baku	2015–16	Azerbaijan Premier League	29	4	3	1	6	2	—		38	7
Gabala	2016–17	Azerbaijan Premier League	14	0	4	0	11	1	—		29	1
Tobol	2017	Kazakhstan Premier League	14	1	0	0	—		—		14	1
Tobol	2018	Kazakhstan Premier League	23	2	1	0	4	0	—		28	2
Tobol	2019	Kazakhstan Premier League	22	2	2	0	2	0	—		26	2
Tobol	2020	Kazakhstan Premier League	16	0	0	0	—		—		16	0
Tobol	Total		75	5	3	0	6	0	—		84	5
Lech Poznań	2020–21	Ekstraklasa	12	0	1	0	—		—		13	0
Lech Poznań	2021–22	Ekstraklasa	29	2	6	0	—		—		35	2
Lech Poznań	2022–23	Ekstraklasa	28	2	1	0	19 (Note: Two appearances in UEFA Champions League, seventeen appearances and one goal in UEFA Europa Conference League)	1	1 (Note: Appearance in Polish Super Cup)	0	49	3
Lech Poznań	2023–24	Ekstraklasa	22	1	3	0	1 (Note: Appearance in UEFA Europa Conference League)	0	—		26	1
Lech Poznań	Total		91	5	11	0	20	1	1	0	123	6
Nyíregyháza	2024–25	Nemzeti Bajnokság I	17	1	2	0	—		—		19	1
Career total			386	39	39	4	50	5	1	0	477	48

=== International ===
Appearances and goals by national team and year
National team	Year	Apps	Goals
Georgia	2015	2	0
Georgia	2016	3	0
Georgia	2017	8	0
Georgia	2018	8	0
Georgia	2019	4	0
Georgia	2020	8	0
Georgia	2021	8	0
Georgia	2022	9	0
Georgia	2023	7	0
Georgia	2024	4	0
Georgia	2025	1	0
Total		62	0

== Honours ==
Dinamo Tbilisi

- Umaglesi Liga: 2012–13
- Georgian Cup: 2012–13

Dila Gori

- Umaglesi Liga: 2014–15

Lech Poznań

- Ekstraklasa: 2021–22
