= Vitaliy Vernydub =

Ukrainian footballer

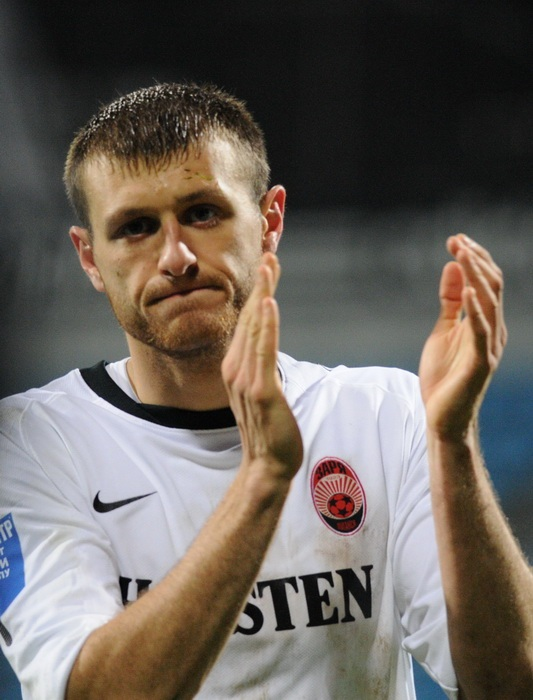

Personal information
- Full name: Vitaliy Yuriyovych Vernydub
- Date of birth: 17 October 1987 (age 39)
- Place of birth: Zaporizhzhia, Ukrainian SSR
- Height: 1.95 m (6 ft 5 in)
- Position: Centre-back

Team information
- Current team: Kryvbas Kryvyi Rih (assistant)

Youth career
- 1997–2000: DYuSSh Smena Saint Petersburg
- 2000–2004: Metalurh Zaporizhzhia

Senior career*
Years	Team	Apps	(Gls)
2004–2012	Metalurh Zaporizhzhia	95	(5)
2004–2006	→ Metalurh-2 Zaporizhzhia	21	(2)
2007	→ Kryvbas Kryvyi Rih (loan)	9	(0)
2012–2015	Zorya Luhansk	73	(5)
2015–2018	Gabala	45	(2)
2018–2022	Zorya Luhansk	82	(2)
2022–2023	Kryvbas Kryvyi Rih	11	(1)
Total		336	(17)

International career
2005	Ukraine U18	2	(0)
2007	Ukraine U21	2	(0)
2014	Ukraine	1	(0)

Managerial career
- 2023–: Kryvbas Kryvyi Rih (assistant)
- 2025–: Ukraine U21 (assistant)
- * Club domestic league appearances and goals

Vitaliy Yuriyovych Vernydub (Ukrainian: Віталій Юрійович Вернидуб; born 17 October 1987) is a Ukrainian football manager and retired professional footballer who played as a centre-back.

== Career ==
=== Club ===
Vernydub is a graduate of Metalurh Zaporizhzhia Youth school system, where he was trained by Oleksandr Rudyka. He was loaned off to Kryvbas Kryvyy Rih for the second half of the 2006–2007 season, where he managed to play 9 matches for the club. Vernydub debuted for the senior Metalurh Zaporizhzhia team on 13 July 2007, at a home game against rivals Karpaty Lviv, which the club won 1–0.

==== Gabala ====
On 11 June 2015, Vernydub signed a one-year contract with Azerbaijan Premier League side Gabala FK. On 11 May 2017, Vernydub signed a new one-year contract, leaving Gabala on 31 May 2018.

==== Return to Zorya Luhansk ====
On 19 June 2018, Vernydub signed a two-year contract with Zorya Luhansk.

==== Return to Kryvbas Kryvyi Rih ====
On 2 July 2022 he moved to Kryvbas Kryvyi Rih.

== Personal life ==
His father Yuriy Vernydub is a formal coach of Kryvbas Kryvyi Rih.

== Career statistics ==
=== Club ===
As of match played 28 May 2018

Club	Season	League			National Cup		Continental		Other		Total	
Club	Season	Division	Apps	Goals	Apps	Goals	Apps	Goals	Apps	Goals	Apps	Goals
Metalurh-2 Zaporizhzhia (loan)	2003–04	Ukrainian Second League	5	0			-		-		5	0
Metalurh-2 Zaporizhzhia (loan)	2004–05	Ukrainian Second League	3	1			-		-		3	1
Metalurh-2 Zaporizhzhia (loan)	2005–06	Ukrainian Second League	11	1			-		-		11	1
Metalurh-2 Zaporizhzhia (loan)	2006–07	Ukrainian Second League	2	0			-		-		2	0
Metalurh-2 Zaporizhzhia (loan)	Total		21	2	0	0	0	0	0	0	21	2
Kryvbas Kryvyi Rih (loan)	2006–07	Ukrainian Premier League	9	0	0	0	–		–		9	0
Metalurh Zaporizhzhia	2007–08	Ukrainian Premier League	18	3	1	0	-		-		19	3
Metalurh Zaporizhzhia	2008–09	Ukrainian Premier League	29	1	1	0	-		-		30	1
Metalurh Zaporizhzhia	2009–10	Ukrainian Premier League	15	1	1	0	-		-		16	1
Metalurh Zaporizhzhia	2010–11	Ukrainian Premier League	21	0	3	0	-		-		24	0
Metalurh Zaporizhzhia	2011–12	Ukrainian Premier League	12	0	0	0	-		-		12	0
Metalurh Zaporizhzhia	Total		95	5	4	0	0	0	0	0	99	5
Zorya Luhansk	2011–12	Ukrainian Premier League	8	2	1	0	-		-		9	2
Zorya Luhansk	2012–13	Ukrainian Premier League	15	1	0	0	-		-		15	1
Zorya Luhansk	2013–14	Ukrainian Premier League	26	0	1	0	-		-		27	0
Zorya Luhansk	2014–15	Ukrainian Premier League	23	2	4	0	4	0	-		31	2
Zorya Luhansk	Total		72	5	8	0	4	0	0	0	84	5
Gabala	2015–16	Azerbaijan Premier League	11	0	3	0	8	0	-		22	0
Gabala	2016–17	Azerbaijan Premier League	14	2	3	0	14	1	-		31	3
Gabala	2017–18	Azerbaijan Premier League	20	0	1	0	4	0	-		25	0
Gabala	Total		45	2	7	0	26	1	-	-	78	3
Career total			242	14	19	0	30	1	0	0	291	15

=== International ===
Ukraine
Year	Apps	Goals
2014	1	0
Total	1	0

Statistics accurate as of match played 18 November 2014

== Personal life ==
He is a son of the Ukrainian coach Yuriy Vernydub.
