= Rafael Santos (footballer, born 1984) =

Brazilian footballer

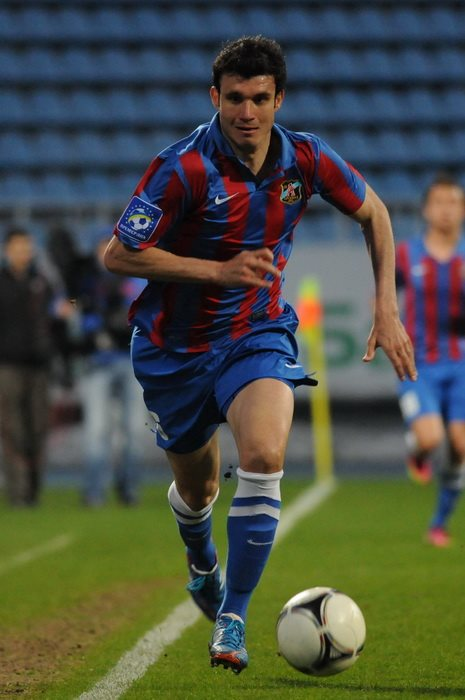

Personal information
- Full name: Rafael Alves dos Santos
- Date of birth: November 10, 1984 (age 42)
- Place of birth: Jaboticabal, Brazil
- Height: 1.87 m (6 ft 1 1/2 in)
- Position: Central defender

Youth career
- 2001–2002: Ponte Preta

Senior career*
| Years | Team | Apps | (Gls) |
| 2003–2006 | Ponte Preta | 72 | (6) |
| 2006–2007 | Internacional | 0 | (0) |
| 2007–2011 | Atlético-PR | 32 | (5) |
| 2008 | → Vitória (loan) | 0 | (0) |
| 2009–2010 | → Bologna (loan) | 2 | (0) |
| 2012 | XV de Piracicaba | 9 | (0) |
| 2012–2013 | Arsenal Kyiv | 22 | (0) |
| 2014–2017 | Gabala | 72 | (2) |
| 2019–2021 | Ciliverghe Calcio | 0 | (0) |
- * Club domestic league appearances and goals as of 18 February 2023

Rafael Alves dos Santos, or simply Rafael Santos (born 10 November 1984 in Jaboticabal), is a Brazilian central defender.

== Career ==
On 4 August 2009 Bologna F.C. 1909 signed the Brazilian defender from Atlético Paranaense on loan for one season.

In June 2012 Santos signed a two-year contract, with the possibility of a third, with Arsenal Kyiv in the Ukrainian Premier League. He left Arsenal Kyiv in November 2013 when his contract was cancelled after the club was declared bankrupt. In December 2013 he agreed to a two-year contract with Gabala. On 6 January 2014 Santos completed his move to Gabala. On 20 December 2015, he extended his Gabala contract until 2017. He left Gabala in May 2017 after the expiration of his contract.

== Career statistics ==
=== Club ===
As of Match played 29 April 2017

Appearances and goals by club, season and competition
| Club | Season | League | | | National Cup | | League Cup | | Continental | | Other | | Total | |
| Club | Season | Division | Apps | Goals | Apps | Goals | Apps | Goals | Apps | Goals | Apps | Goals | Apps | Goals |
|---|---|---|---|---|---|---|---|---|---|---|---|---|---|---|
| Atlético Paranaense | 2009 | Série A | 11 | 3 | 0 | 0 | - | | - | | 0 | 0 | 11 | 3 |
| Atlético Paranaense | 2010 | Série A | 5 | 1 | 0 | 0 | - | | - | | 0 | 0 | 5 | 1 |
| Atlético Paranaense | 2011 | Série A | 14 | 0 | 6 | 1 | - | | 2 | 0 | 16 | 0 | 36 | 1 |
| Atlético Paranaense | Total | | 30 | 4 | 6 | 1 | - | - | 2 | 0 | 16 | 0 | 54 | 5 |
| Bologna (loan) | 2009–10 | Serie A | 2 | 0 | 0 | 0 | – | | – | | – | | 2 | 0 |
| XV de Piracicaba | 2012 | Campeonato Paulista | 0 | 0 | 0 | 0 | – | | – | | 9 | 0 | 9 | 0 |
| Arsenal Kyiv | 2012–13 | Ukrainian Premier League | 12 | 0 | 1 | 0 | – | | – | | – | | 13 | 0 |
| Arsenal Kyiv | 2013–14 | Ukrainian Premier League | 10 | 0 | 1 | 0 | – | | – | | – | | 11 | 0 |
| Arsenal Kyiv | Total | | 22 | 0 | 2 | 0 | - | - | - | - | - | - | 24 | 0 |
| Gabala | 2013–14 | Azerbaijan Premier League | 15 | 0 | 3 | 0 | – | | 0 | 0 | – | | 18 | 0 |
| Gabala | 2014–15 | Azerbaijan Premier League | 28 | 0 | 3 | 0 | – | | 2 | 0 | – | | 33 | 0 |
| Gabala | 2015–16 | Azerbaijan Premier League | 20 | 2 | 3 | 0 | – | | 10 | 0 | – | | 33 | 2 |
| Gabala | 2016–17 | Azerbaijan Premier League | 9 | 0 | 3 | 0 | – | | 8 | 0 | – | | 20 | 0 |
| Gabala | Total | | 72 | 2 | 12 | 0 | - | - | 20 | 0 | - | - | 104 | 2 |
| Career total | | | 126 | 6 | 20 | 1 | - | - | 22 | 0 | 25 | 0 | 193 | 7 |

== Honours ==
Vitória

- Campeonato Baiano (1): 2008

Atlético Paranaense

- Campeonato Paranaense (1): 2009
