= 2015–16 Gabala FC season =

Gabala
2015-16 season
- Chairman: Tale Heydarov
- Manager: Roman Hryhorchuk
- Stadium: Gabala City Stadium
- Premier League: 3rd
- Azerbaijan Cup: Semifinal
- Europa League: Group Stage
- Top goalscorer: League: Oleksiy Gai (10); All: Oleksiy Gai (14)
Home colours	Away colours

The 2015–16 season was Gabala FK's 11th season, and their 10th in the Azerbaijan Premier League, the top-flight of Azerbaijani football. Domestically, Gabala finished 3rd in the Premier League for the third season in a row and reached the semifinals of the Azerbaijan Cup where they were defeated by Neftchi Baku. In Europe Gabala reached the group stages of the UEFA Europa League where they faced PAOK, Krasnodar and Borussia Dortmund before finishing bottom of the group.

== Season review ==
In September 2015, Gabala announced a new one-year shirt sponsorship deal with QafqaZ Hotels and Resorts.

=== Transfers ===
The summer transfer window saw a lot of transfer movement from Gabala, with 14 players leaving the club and 9 players arriving. The most notable departures were the club's all-time leading goalscorer Victor Mendy returning to France, Ruslan Fomin moving to FC Atyrau in Kazakhstan, and Ekigho Ehiosun returning to parent club Gençlerbirliği S.K. Alexandru Benga, Ruslan Abışov, Adrian Ropotan, Pavol Farkaš and Mikhail Sivakow also left the clubs at the end of their contracts.

Arif Dashdemirov, Magomed Mirzabekov, Asif Mammadov all joined from Inter Baku PIK permanently, whilst Vojislav Stanković also joined from Inter Baku on an 18-month loan deal. Andrey Popovich and Samir Zargarov also joined from other Azerbaijan Premier League clubs, Sumgayit FK and Simurq PFC respectively. Sergei Zenjov moved from recently relegated Russian Premier League side FC Torpedo Moscow, Vitaliy Vernydub from FC Zorya Luhansk, Oleksiy Antonov from FC Aktobe, and George Florescu from Astra Giurgiu.

== Transfers ==
=== Summer ===
In: Note: Flags indicate national team as defined under FIFA eligibility rules; some limited exceptions apply. Players may hold more than one non-FIFA nationality.

No.	Pos.	Nation	Player
1	GK	AZE	Andrey Popovich (from (Azerbaijan) Sumgayit)
3	DF	SRB	Vojislav Stanković (loan from (Azerbaijan) Inter Baku)
5	MF	ROU	George Florescu (from (Romania) Astra Giurgiu)
7	FW	BIH	Ermin Zec (from (Turkey) Balıkesirspor)
8	MF	AZE	Magomed Mirzabekov (from (Azerbaijan) Inter Baku)
9	FW	EST	Sergei Zenjov (from (Russia) Torpedo Moscow)
11	MF	AZE	Asif Mammadov (from (Azerbaijan) Inter Baku)
15	DF	UKR	Vitaliy Vernydub (from (Ukraine) Zorya Luhansk)
17	FW	AZE	Vüqar Nadirov (from (Azerbaijan) Khazar Lankaran)
18	MF	AZE	Vadim Abdullayev (from (Azerbaijan) Simurq)
21	MF	AZE	Arif Dashdemirov (from (Azerbaijan) Inter Baku)
32	FW	ARG	Facundo Pereyra (loan from (Greece) PAOK)
33	GK	POL	Dawid Pietrzkiewicz
66	MF	AZE	Samir Zargarov (from (Azerbaijan) Simurq)
69	FW	UKR	Oleksiy Antonov (from (Kazakhstan) Aktobe)
70	FW	AZE	Vagif Javadov (loan from (Azerbaijan) Khazar Lankaran)
87	DF	AZE	Ruslan Abışov (from (Azerbaijan) Khazar Lankaran)
88	MF	PAR	David Meza (from (Azerbaijan) Inter Baku)

Out: Note: Flags indicate national team as defined under FIFA eligibility rules; some limited exceptions apply. Players may hold more than one non-FIFA nationality.

No.	Pos.	Nation	Player
5	DF	AZE	Sadig Guliyev (loan to (Azerbaijan) Zira)
7	DF	AZE	Ruslan Amirjanov (to (Azerbaijan) Inter Baku)
9	FW	SEN	Victor Mendy
12	DF	ROU	Alexandru Benga (to (Romania) Petrolul Ploiești)
14	FW	AZE	Javid Huseynov (Jailed)
15	DF	AZE	Ruslan Abışov (to (Azerbaijan) Khazar Lankaran)
16	MF	AZE	Ruslan Tagizade (to (Azerbaijan) Zira)
18	FW	UKR	Ruslan Fomin (to (Kazakhstan) Atyrau)
25	MF	ROU	Adrian Ropotan (to (Romania) Petrolul Ploiești)
26	DF	SVK	Pavol Farkaš (to (Greece) Skoda Xanthi)
27	FW	AZE	Bakhtiyar Soltanov (to (Azerbaijan) Kapaz)
28	DF	AZE	İbrahim Aslanli
30	GK	AZE	Anar Nazirov (to (Azerbaijan) Zira)
32	MF	BLR	Mikhail Sivakow (to (Ukraine) Zorya Luhansk)
55	GK	AZE	Javidan Huseynzadeh
88	MF	AZE	Mushfig Teymurov (loan to (Azerbaijan) AZAL)
90	FW	NGR	Ekigho Ehiosun (loan return to (Turkey) Gençlerbirliği)
99	MF	AZE	Tellur Mutallimov (loan to (Azerbaijan) Zira)
—	DF	AZE	Rashid Amiraslanov
—	MF	AZE	Tarzin Jahangirov (loan to (Azerbaijan) Zira, previously on loan to Sumgayit)

=== Winter ===
In: Note: Flags indicate national team as defined under FIFA eligibility rules; some limited exceptions apply. Players may hold more than one non-FIFA nationality.

No.	Pos.	Nation	Player
5	DF	AZE	Pavlo Pashayev (from (Ukraine) Metalurh Zaporizhya)
32	FW	AZE	Rashad Eyyubov (from (Azerbaijan) Kapaz)
—	FW	BRA	Emerson (Trial)

Out: Note: Flags indicate national team as defined under FIFA eligibility rules; some limited exceptions apply. Players may hold more than one non-FIFA nationality.

No.	Pos.	Nation	Player
5	MF	ROU	George Florescu (to (Cyprus) Omonia)
17	FW	AZE	Vüqar Nadirov (to (Azerbaijan) Inter Baku)
32	FW	ARG	Facundo Pereyra (loan return to (Greece) PAOK)
70	FW	AZE	Vagif Javadov (loan return to (Azerbaijan) Khazar Lankaran)
88	MF	PAR	David Meza (to (Paraguay) Cerro Porteño)
—	MF	AZE	Mushfig Teymurov (to (Azerbaijan) Shamkir, previously on loan to (Azerbaijan) AZAL)

== Squad ==
As of match played 20 May 2016

No.	Name	Nationality	Position	Date of birth (age)	Signed from	Signed in	Contract ends	Apps.	Goals
Goalkeepers
1	Andrey Popovich	(Azerbaijan)	GK	4 March 1992 (aged 24)	Sumgayit	2015		10	0
22	Dmytro Bezotosnyi	(Ukraine)	GK	15 November 1983 (aged 32)	(Ukraine) Chornomorets Odesa	2015	2016	61	0
33	Dawid Pietrzkiewicz	(Poland)	GK	9 February 1988 (aged 28)	Free Agent	2015		12	0
36	Suleyman Suleymanov	(Azerbaijan)	GK	20 March 1997 (aged 19)	Trainee	2015		0	0
Defenders
2	Sahil Mirzoyev	(Azerbaijan)	DF	18 January 1997 (aged 19)	Trainee	2015		0	0
3	Vojislav Stanković	(Serbia)	DF	22 September 1987 (aged 28)	loan from Inter Baku	2015	2017	39	0
5	Pavlo Pashayev	(Azerbaijan)	DF	4 January 1988 (aged 28)	(Ukraine) Metalurh Zaporizhya	2016	2016	2	0
13	Murad Musayev	(Azerbaijan)	DF	13 June 1994 (aged 21)	Trainee	2012		5	0
15	Vitaliy Vernydub	(Ukraine)	DF	17 October 1987 (aged 28)	(Ukraine) Zorya Luhansk	2015	2016	22	0
20	Ricardinho	(Brazil)	DF	9 September 1984 (aged 31)	(Sweden) Malmö	2015		42	1
21	Arif Dashdemirov	(Azerbaijan)	DF	10 February 1987 (aged 29)	Inter Baku	2015		64	1
34	Urfan Abbasov	(Azerbaijan)	DF	14 October 1992 (aged 23)	Qarabağ	2011		126	2
44	Rafael Santos	(Brazil)	DF	10 November 1984 (aged 31)	(Ukraine) Arsenal Kyiv	2014	2017	84	2
74	Yusif Nabiyev	(Azerbaijan)	DF		Trainee	2015		0	0
87	Ruslan Abışov	(Azerbaijan)	DF	10 October 1987 (aged 28)	Khazar Lankaran	2015	2016	51	4
Midfielders
4	Elvin Jamalov	(Azerbaijan)	MF	4 February 1995 (aged 21)	Trainee	2013		73	0
6	Rashad Sadiqov	(Azerbaijan)	MF	8 October 1983 (aged 32)	Khazar Lankaran	2015		56	2
8	Magomed Mirzabekov	(Azerbaijan)	MF	16 November 1990 (aged 25)	Inter Baku	2015		29	0
11	Asif Mammadov	(Azerbaijan)	MF	5 August 1986 (aged 29)	Inter Baku	2015	2016	26	3
16	Emin Zamanov	(Azerbaijan)	MF	26 December 1997 (aged 18)	Trainee	2015		0	0
18	Vadim Abdullayev	(Azerbaijan)	MF	17 December 1994 (aged 21)	Simurq	2015		1	0
19	Oleksiy Gai	(Ukraine)	MF	6 November 1982 (aged 33)	(Ukraine) Chornomorets Odesa	2015	2016	71	18
25	Qismət Alıyev	(Azerbaijan)	MF	24 October 1996 (aged 19)	Trainee	2014		8	0
37	Kamal Mirzayev	(Azerbaijan)	MF	14 September 1994 (aged 21)	Trainee	2012		5	0
66	Samir Zargarov	(Azerbaijan)	MF	29 August 1986 (aged 29)	Simurq	2015		122	14
77	Ehtiram Şahverdiyev	(Azerbaijan)	MF	1 October 1996 (aged 19)	Trainee	2015		2	0
Forwards
7	Ermin Zec	(Bosnia and Herzegovina)	ST	18 February 1988 (aged 28)	(Turkey) Balıkesirspor	2015	2016	36	10
9	Sergei Zenjov	(Estonia)	ST	20 April 1989 (aged 27)	(Russia) Torpedo Moscow	2015	2017	42	5
10	Dodô	(Brazil)	ST	16 October 1987 (aged 28)	(Croatia) Lokomotiva	2011	2016	161	30
32	Rashad Eyyubov	(Azerbaijan)	ST	3 December 1995 (aged 20)	Kapaz	2016		21	2
69	Oleksiy Antonov	(Ukraine)	ST	8 May 1986 (aged 30)	(Kazakhstan) Aktobe	2015	2017	49	8
90	Ramil Hasanov	(Ukraine)	ST	15 February 1996 (aged 20)	Trainee	2015		0	0
97	Roman Huseynov	(Azerbaijan)	ST	26 December 1997 (aged 18)	Trainee	2015		4	0
Left during the season
5	George Florescu	(Romania)	MF	21 May 1984 (aged 31)	(Romania) Astra Giurgiu	2015	2017	4	0
14	Javid Huseynov	(Azerbaijan)	ST	9 March 1988 (aged 28)	FK Baku	2014		40	15
17	Vüqar Nadirov	(Azerbaijan)	ST	15 June 1987 (aged 28)	Khazar Lankaran	2015	2015	0	0
32	Facundo Pereyra	(Argentina)	ST	3 October 1987 (aged 28)	loan from (Greece) PAOK	2015	2016	21	5
70	Vagif Javadov	(Azerbaijan)	ST	25 May 1989 (aged 26)	loan from Khazar Lankaran	2015	2015	5	1
88	David Meza	(Paraguay)	MF	15 August 1988 (aged 27)	Inter Baku	2015	2016	10	1

=== Out on loan ===
Note: Flags indicate national team as defined under FIFA eligibility rules; some limited exceptions apply. Players may hold more than one non-FIFA nationality.

No.	Pos.	Nation	Player
—	DF	AZE	Sadig Guliyev (at Kapaz)
—	MF	AZE	Tarzin Jahangirov (at Zira)

No.	Pos.	Nation	Player
—	MF	AZE	Tellur Mutallimov (at Zira)

== Friendlies ==
14 June 2015	Erzurumspor U21 (Turkey)	1 – 2	(Azerbaijan) Gabala	Erzurum, Turkey
19:30 AZST (UTC+5)	H.Kadakın 38' (pen.)	Report	Gai 33', 55'	Stadium: Kazım Karabekir Stadium

18 June 2015	Ashkalespor (Turkey)	0 – 10	(Azerbaijan) Gabala	Erzurum, Turkey
20:00 AZST (UTC+5)		Report	Gai 12'; Mammadov 15'; Dodô 25', 26'; S.Zargarov 48', 57', 77'; Sadiqov 66'; Alıyev 68', 69'	Stadium: Kazım Karabekir Stadium

24 June 2015	Gabala	1 – 0	Inter Baku	Qabala
AZST (UTC+5)	Antonov 68'	Report		Stadium: Gabala City Stadium

27 June 2015	Gabala	1 – 1	Inter Baku	Qabala
20:00 AZST (UTC+5)	Huseynov 70'	Report	R.Aliyev 8'	Stadium: Gabala City Stadium

6 September 2015	Chornomorets Odesa (Ukraine)	0 – 2	(Azerbaijan) Gabala	Odesa, Ukraine
AZST (UTC+5)		Report	Antonov 13'; Vernydub 69'	Stadium: Chornomorets Stadium; Attendance: 5,500

16 January 2016	Osnabrück (Germany)	1 – 1	(Azerbaijan) Gabala	Antalya, Turkey
17:30 AZT (UTC+4)	Pisot 83'	Report	Zec 57'

20 January 2016	Zürich (Switzerland)	0 – 4	(Azerbaijan) Gabala	Antalya, Turkey
AZT (UTC+4)		Report	V.Abdullayev 27'; Antonov 73', 75'; S.Zargarov 80'

24 January 2016	Dnipro Dnipropetrovsk (Ukraine)	1 – 0	(Azerbaijan) Gabala	Antalya, Turkey
AZT (UTC+4)	Edmar 39'	Report

== Competitions ==
=== Azerbaijan Premier League ===
==== Results summary ====
Overall								Home						Away					
Pld	W	D	L	GF	GA	GD	Pts	W	D	L	GF	GA	GD	W	D	L	GF	GA	GD
36	16	11	9	45	27	+18	59	6	9	4	25	15	+10	10	2	5	20	12	+8

Last updated: 15 May 2016.
Source: Soccerway

==== Results ====
10 August 2015 1	Gabala	2 – 2	Qarabağ	Qabala
21:00 AZST (UTC+5)	Zenjov 32'; S.Zargarov (yellow card) 61' (goal) 87'; Sadiqov (red card) 73'	Report	Richard 62' (pen.), 83'; Gurbanov (yellow card) 75'	Stadium: Gabala City Stadium; Attendance: 3,200; Referee: Aliyar Aghayev

15 August 2015 2	AZAL	0 – 2	Gabala	Baku
21:00 AZST (UTC+5)	Malikov (yellow card) 45'; T. Hümbätov (yellow card) 48'; T. Novruzov (yellow card) 76'	Report	Gai 45+1'; Antonov 76'	Stadium: Dalga Arena; Attendance: 250; Referee: Fariz Yusifov

23 August 2015 3	Gabala	1 – 0	Kapaz	Qabala
21:00 AZST (UTC+5)	Zec 6'; Santos (yellow card) 74'; Vernydub (yellow card) 83'	Report	B. Nasirov (yellow card) 21'; T. Narimanov (yellow card) 58'; B. Soltanov (yellow card) 70'; S. Rahimov (yellow card) 81'	Stadium: Gabala City Stadium; Attendance: 900; Referee: Oerxan Mämmädov

12 September 2015 4	Inter Baku	2 – 1	Gabala	Baku
20:00 AZST (UTC+5)	Martins 10', 29'; Hajiyev (yellow card) 88'	Report	U.Abbasov (yellow card) 36'; Dashdemirov (yellow card) 64'; Antonov 84'	Stadium: Inter Arena; Attendance: 1,000; Referee: Rahim Häsänov

21 September 2015 5	Gabala	1 – 0	Sumgayit	Qabala
21:00 AZST (UTC+5)	Jamalov (yellow card) 69'; Abışov (yellow card) 80'; Sadiqov (yellow card) 82'; Gai 90+2' (pen.)	Report	J.Hajiyev (yellow card) 84'; T.Rzayev (yellow card) 90+1'	Stadium: Gabala City Stadium; Attendance: 2,000; Referee: Omar Paşayev

25 September 2015 6	Ravan Baku	0 – 3	Gabala	Baku
20:00 AZST (UTC+5)		Report	Dodô 37'; S.Zargarov 58' (yellow card) 73'; Gai 78'	Stadium: Bayil Stadium; Attendance: 430; Referee: Elvin Äsgärov

4 October 2015 7	Gabala	6 – 0	Khazar Lankaran	Qabala
21:00 AZST (UTC+5)	Dodô 1'; Abışov (yellow card) 4'; Pereyra 10', 79'; Gai 45'; Dashdemirov (yellow card) 56'; Antonov 73'; Mirzabekov (yellow card) 87'; Zec 89'	Report	Scarlatache (yellow card) 61'	Stadium: Gabala City Stadium; Attendance: 1,500; Referee: Rähim Häsänov

17 October 2015 8	Neftchi Baku	0 – 1	Gabala	Baku
15:30 AZST (UTC+5)	M.Isayev (yellow card) 86'	Report	Jamalov (yellow card) 55'; Zenjov (yellow card) 81'; Antonov (yellow card) 83' (goal) 90'; Gai (yellow card) 85'; Dodô (yellow card) 90+3'	Stadium: Bakikhanov Stadium; Attendance: 600; Referee: Rahim Häsänov

25 October 2015 9	Gabala	0 – 0	Zira	Qabala
17:00 AZT (UTC+4)	Abışov (yellow card) 55'; U.Abbasov (yellow card) 64'	Report	Bonilla (yellow card) 90'; Nazirov (yellow card) 90+1'	Stadium: Gabala City Stadium; Attendance: 1,100; Referee: Elvin Äsgärov

28 October 2015 10	Gabala	0 – 0	AZAL	Qabala
17:00 AZT (UTC+4)		Report	Kvirtia (yellow card) 68'; K.Mirzayev (yellow card) 83'; M.Teymurov (yellow card) 90'; Namașco (yellow card) 90+2'	Stadium: Gabala City Stadium; Attendance: 1,050; Referee: Ravan Hämzäzadä

31 October 2015^{5} 11	Gabala	1 – 2	Kapaz	Qabala
18:00 AZT (UTC+4)	Antonov (yellow card) 67'; Pereyra 69'	Report	Sytnik 2'; Eyyubov (yellow card) 65'; T.Simaitis (yellow card) 90+3'; Dário 90+4'	Stadium: Gabala City Stadium; Attendance: 300; Referee: Aliyar Aghayev

9 November 2015 12	Gabala	1 – 1	Inter Baku	Qabala
16:00 AZT (UTC+4)	Antonov 30'; Mirzabekov (yellow card) 36'; U.Abbasov (yellow card) 68'; Stanković (yellow card) 71'; Jamalov (yellow card) 79'; Dashdemirov (yellow card) 90+3'	Report	Martins 35'; Aghayev (yellow card) 77'; A.Hüseynov (yellow card) 90+4'	Stadium: Gabala City Stadium; Attendance: 1,500; Referee: Rahim Häsänov

21 November 2015 13	Sumgayit	2 – 2	Gabala	Sumqayit
17:00 AZT (UTC+4)	Pamuk 29'; Ramazanov (yellow card) 63' (goal) 69'; E.Mehdiyev (yellow card) 67'; B.Hasanalizade (yellow card) 77'; Hüseynov (yellow card) 87'	Report	Vernydub (yellow card) 31'; J.Hajiyev 40' (o.g.); Ricardinho (yellow card) 63'; S.Zargarov 71'; Antonov (yellow card) 78'	Stadium: Kapital Bank Arena; Attendance: 1,150; Referee: Elvin Äsgärov

30 November 2015 14	Gabala	1 – 1	Ravan Baku	Qabala
17:00 AZT (UTC+4)	Mirzabekov (yellow card) 17'; Pereyra 90+5'	Report	E.Aliyev (yellow card) 34'; T.Gurbatov 66'; Makhnovskyi (yellow card) 72'; V.Baybalayev (yellow card) 78'; Suma (yellow card) 82'; Yunisoğlu (yellow card) 90+3'	Stadium: Gabala City Stadium; Attendance: 1,100; Referee: Rauf Jabbarov

6 December 2015 15	Khazar Lankaran	0 – 1	Gabala	Lankaran
16:00 AZT (UTC+4)	I.Säfärzadä (yellow card) 61'	Report	Antonov 20'; Jamalov (yellow card) 49'; Santos (yellow card) 53'	Stadium: Lankaran City Stadium; Attendance: 1,500; Referee: Omar Paşayev

13 December 2015 16	Gabala	0 – 1	Neftchi Baku	Qabala
15:30 AZT (UTC+4)	Dashdemirov (yellow card) 43'; Sadiqov (yellow card) 89'	Report	Jairo 22' (yellow card) 45+2'; Qurbanov (yellow card) 37'; Kurbanov (yellow card) 69'; A.Mammadov	Stadium: Gabala City Stadium; Attendance: 1,000; Referee: Rahim Häsänov

16 December 2015 17	Zira	1 – 0	Gabala	Baku
18:30 AZT (UTC+4)	N.Gurbanov 24'; K.Bayramov (yellow card) 67'	Report	Jamalov (yellow card) 28'	Stadium: Zira Olympic Sport Complex Stadium; Attendance: 700; Referee: Fariz Yusifov

19 December 2015 18	Qarabağ	1 – 1	Gabala	Baku
18:00 AZT (UTC+4)	Richard (yellow card) 71'; Ismayilov 79'	Report	Zec 4'	Stadium: Azersun Arena; Attendance: 2,100; Referee: Aliyar Aghayev

30 January 2016 19	Kapaz	3 – 0	Gabala	Ganja
14:00 AZT (UTC+4)	Ebah 25', 75'; S.Aliyev (yellow card) 45+1'; Alasgarov 57'; B.Nasirov (yellow card) 82'	Report	Zec (yellow card) 78'	Stadium: Ganja City Stadium; Attendance: 9,000; Referee: Fariz Yusifov

7 February 2016 20	Inter Baku	0 – 1	Gabala	Baku
17:40 AZT (UTC+4)	Meza (yellow card) 55'; Nadirov (yellow card) 89'	Report	Sadiqov (yellow card) 9'; Zec 18'; Santos (yellow card) 44'	Stadium: Inter Arena; Attendance: 500; Referee: Rahim Häsänov

14 February 2016 21	Gabala	1 – 0	Sumgayit	Qabala
17:30 AZT (UTC+4)	Jamalov (yellow card) 26'; Zec 69'	Report	Agayev (yellow card) 68'; Guluzade (yellow card) 84'; J.Hajiyev (yellow card) 88'	Stadium: Gabala City Stadium; Attendance: 850; Referee: Ravan Hämzäzadä

21 February 2016 22	Ravan Baku	0 – 1	Gabala	Baku
16:30 AZT (UTC+4)		Report	Dashdemirov 77'	Stadium: Bayil Stadium; Attendance: 300; Referee: Ömər Paşayev

27 February 2016 23	Gabala	0 – 0	Khazar Lankaran	Qabala
17:00 AZT (UTC+4)	Gai (yellow card) 52'; Jamalov (yellow card) 65'; Mammadov (yellow card) 90+4'	Report	I.Gadirzade (yellow card) 68'; O.Sadigli (yellow card) 87'	Stadium: Gabala City Stadium; Attendance: 1,100; Referee: Ravan Həmzəzadə

5 March 2016 24	Neftchi Baku	1 – 2	Gabala	Baku
15:00 AZT (UTC+4)	Añete 26'; A.Mammadov (yellow card) 52'; Jairo (red card) 80'; Qurbanov (yellow card) 80'	Report	Santos 50' (yellow card) 70'; Antonov (yellow card) 75'; Eyyubov 90'	Stadium: Bakikhanov Stadium; Attendance: 1,000; Referee: Omar Paşayev

13 March 2016 25	Gabala	1 – 2	Zira	Qabala
15:00 AZT (UTC+4)	Gai 17'; Zec (yellow card) 30'; Stanković (yellow card) 90+4'	Report	Mbah (yellow card) 24'; Bonilla 40', 84' (yellow card) 64'; V.Mustafayev (yellow card) 76'; A.Naghiyev (yellow card) 90+2'	Stadium: Gabala City Stadium; Attendance: 2,200; Referee: Fariz Yusifov

19 March 2016 26	Gabala	1 – 2	Qarabağ	Qabala
15:00 AZT (UTC+4)	Zenjov 17'; Zec (yellow card) 21'	Report	Míchel 9'; Yunuszade (yellow card) 35'; M.Mädätov 72' (yellow card) 87'	Stadium: Gabala City Stadium; Attendance: 4,000; Referee: Aliyar Aghayev

30 March 2016 27	AZAL	2 – 1	Gabala	Baku
15:00 AZT (UTC+4)	K.Huseynov (yellow card) 5'; Malikov (yellow card) 36'; Jafarguliyev (yellow card) 43'; T.Hümbatov 54'; M.Sattarli 73'	Report	Gai 37' (pen.); Santos (yellow card) 65'; Abbasov (yellow card) 67'; Eyyubov (yellow card) 82'; Zec (yellow card) 84'	Stadium: AZAL Arena; Attendance: 400; Referee: Ingilab Məmmədov

3 April 2016 28	Gabala	0 – 0	Inter Baku	Qabala
19:00 AZT (UTC+4)	Mammadov (yellow card) 54'	Report	Salukvadze (yellow card) 59'; Fomenko (yellow card) 90+2'	Stadium: Gabala City Stadium; Attendance: 450; Referee: Rəhim Həsənov

9 April 2016 29	Sumgayit	1 – 1	Gabala	Sumqayit
14:00 AZT (UTC+4)	Guluzade (yellow card) 9'; Fardjad-Azad 85' (pen.)	Report	Gai (yellow card) 33' (goal) 65'; Stanković (yellow card) 62'	Stadium: Kapital Bank Arena; Attendance: 1,300; Referee: Omar Paşayev

15 April 2016 30	Gabala	2 – 0	Ravan Baku	Qabala
16:00 AZT (UTC+4)	Ricardinho (yellow card) 68'; Jamalov (yellow card) 73'; Mammadov (yellow card) 76' (goal) 80'; Antonov 85'; Stanković (yellow card) 88'	Report	Yunisoğlu (yellow card) 54' (yellow-red card) 61'	Stadium: Gabala City Stadium; Attendance: 600; Referee: Rauf Jabbarov

23 April 2016 31	Khazar Lankaran	0 – 1	Gabala	Lankaran
16:30 AZT (UTC+4)	M.Qambarli (yellow card) 24'; O.Sadigli (yellow card) 88'; Mammadov (yellow card) 88'	Report	Gai 9'; Vernydub (yellow card) 62'; S.Zargarov (yellow card) 66'	Stadium: Lankaran City Stadium; Attendance: 2,000; Referee: Rahim Həsənov

1 May 2016 32	Gabala	2 – 2	Neftchi Baku	Qabala
16:30 AZT (UTC+4)	Gai 21' (pen.); Sadiqov 51'; Mirzabekov (yellow card) 87'; Zec (yellow card) 90'	Report	R.Mammadov (yellow card) 10'; Kurbanov (yellow card) 16'; Qurbanov 32'; E.Abdullayev 64'	Stadium: Gabala City Stadium; Attendance: 1,500; Referee: Rauf Jabbarov

7 May 2016 33	Zira	0 – 3	Gabala	Baku
15:00 AZT (UTC+4)	Bonilla (yellow card) 72'; V.Igbekoi (yellow card) 83'	Report	Vernydub (yellow card) 16'; Santos 26' (yellow card) 53'; Zec (yellow card) 38' (goal) 47', 79'; Gai (yellow card) 66'; Sadiqov (yellow card) 72'; Ricardinho (yellow card) 88'	Stadium: Zira Olympic Sport Complex Stadium; Attendance: 1,300; Referee: Rauf Jabbarov

11 May 2016 34	Qarabağ	2 – 0	Gabala	Masazir
19:00 AZT (UTC+4)	Quintana 17', 32'	Report	Abbasov (yellow card) 66'; Stanković (yellow card) 76'; Zec (yellow card) 90+3'	Stadium: Alinja Arena; Attendance: 1,500; Referee: Rahim Həsənov

15 May 2016 35	Gabala	2 – 0	AZAL	Qabala
18:00 AZT (UTC+4)	Mammadov 21'; Vernydub (yellow card) 57'; Zec (yellow card) 79'; K.Huseynov 87' (o.g.); Stanković (yellow card) 90'	Report	Coronado (yellow card) 81'; Malikov (yellow card) 83'; Guruli (yellow card) 90'	Stadium: Gabala City Stadium; Attendance: 1,000; Referee: Revan Həmzəzadə

20 May 2016 36	Kapaz	0 – 1	Gabala	Ganja
17:00 AZT (UTC+4)	B.Nasirov (yellow card) 17'; S.Rahimov (yellow card) 88'	Report	Mammadov (yellow card) 14'; S.Zargarov (yellow card) 27'; Antonov (yellow card) 39'; Gai 76' (yellow card) 90+1'; Vernydub (yellow card) 80'	Stadium: Ganja City Stadium; Attendance: 9,000; Referee: Rahim Həsənov

==== League table ====
Pos	Team	Pld	W	D	L	GF	GA	GD	Pts	Qualification or relegation
1	Qarabağ (C)	36	26	6	4	66	21	+45	84	Qualification for the Champions League second qualifying round (Note: Qarabağ qualified for the Europa League first qualifying round by winning the 2015–16 Azerbaijan Cup. However, since they already qualified for European competition based on their league position, the spot awarded to the cup winners was passed down the league.)
2	Zira (Note: Zira would have qualified for the Europa League first qualifying round, but failed to obtain a UEFA licence as the club has existed professionally for less than three season.)	36	17	11	8	42	31	+11	62	
3	Gabala	36	16	11	9	44	28	+16	59 (Note: Gabala ahead of Inter Baku on head-to-head record: Inter Baku–Gabala 2–1, Gabala–Inter Baku 1–1, Inter Baku–Gabala 0–1, Gabala–Inter Baku 0–0.)	Qualification for the Europa League first qualifying round
4	Inter Baku (Note: On 31 March 2016, the Adjudicatory Chamber of the UEFA Club Financial Control Body (CFCB) announced that Inter Baku will be excluded from participating in the next UEFA club competition for which they would otherwise qualify in the next three seasons (i.e. the 2016/17, 2017/18 and 2018/19 seasons).)	36	16	11	9	39	28	+11	59	
5	Kapaz	36	15	11	10	48	40	+8	56	Qualification for the Europa League first qualifying round

Source: PFL, UEFA, Soccerway
Rules for classification: 1) Points; 2) Head-to-head points; 3) Head-to-head goal difference; 4) Head-to-head goals scored; 5) Head-to-head away goals scored (only if two teams); 6) Goal difference; 7) Goals scored.
(C) Champions

=== Azerbaijan Cup ===
3 December 2015 Second round	Gabala	7 – 0	Mil-Muğan	Qabala
17:00 AZT (UTC+4)	Meza 6'; S.Zargarov 16'; Pereyra 22'; Q.Alıyev (yellow card) 25' (yellow-red card) 68'; Ricardinho 42'; Zec 44'; Javadov 58'; Mammadov 83'	Summary		Stadium: Gabala City Stadium; Attendance: 300; Referee: Orkhan Mämmädov

2 March 2016 Quarterfinal 1st leg	Zira	1 – 2	Gabala	Baku
18:00 AZT (UTC+4)	Bonilla 77'; V.Mustafayev (yellow card) 84'	Summary	Zenjov (yellow card) 32'; Gai 75'; Dodô 83'	Stadium: Zira Olympic Sport Complex Stadium; Attendance: 630; Referee: Rahim Hasanov

9 March 2016 Quarterfinal 2nd leg	Gabala	5 – 1 (7 – 2 agg.)	Zira	Qabala
15:00 AZT (UTC+4)	Gai 5', 12'; Sadiqov 17'; Eyyubov 65'; Zec 79'	Summary	N.Novruzov 36'	Stadium: Gabala City Stadium; Attendance: 2,000; Referee: Rauf Jabbarov

27 April 2016 Semifinal 1st leg	Neftchi Baku	1 – 1	Gabala	Baku
19:00 AZT (UTC+4)	Jairo (yellow card) 33'; Hajiyev 71'; F.Muradbayli (yellow card) 86'	Summary	Gai 5' (yellow card) 74'; Abbasov (yellow card) 41'; Sadiqov (yellow card) 54' (yellow-red card) 84'	Stadium: Bakcell Arena; Attendance: 3,000; Referee: Aliyar Aghayev

4 May 2016 Semifinal 2nd leg	Gabala	1 – 1 (a.e.t.) (2 – 2 agg.) (3–4 p)	Neftchi Baku	Qabala
16:00 AZT (UTC+4)	Mammadov (yellow card) 20'; Jamalov (yellow card) 44'; S.Zargarov (yellow card) 61'; Zec 76' (yellow card) 120'	Summary	Qurbanov 59'; Ramos (yellow card) 61'; Ailton (yellow card) 68'	Stadium: Gabala City Stadium; Attendance: 4,200; Referee: Fariz Yusifov
	Penalties
	Gai (penalty scored); Antonov (penalty scored); Zec (penalty scored); Vernydub (penalty missed); S.Zargarov (penalty missed)		Ramos (penalty scored); Jairo (penalty scored); A.Abdullayev (penalty scored); Añete (penalty missed); R.Qurbanov (penalty scored)

=== UEFA Europa League ===
==== Qualifying rounds ====
2 July 2015 First qualifying round 1st leg	Dinamo Tbilisi (Georgia (country))	2 – 1	(Azerbaijan) Gabala	Tbilisi, Georgia
21:00 AZST (UTC+5)	Gvelesiani (red card) 51'; Jighauri 65'; Totadze (yellow card) 79'; Iashvili (yellow card) 81'; Papunashvili 84'	Report	Florescu (yellow card) 35'; Vernydub (yellow card) 69'; Huseynov 74'	Stadium: Boris Paichadze Dinamo Arena; Attendance: 7,500; Referee: Roi Reinshreiber (Israel)

9 July 2015 First qualifying round 2nd leg	Gabala (Azerbaijan)	2 – 0 (3 – 2 agg.)	(Georgia (country)) Dinamo Tbilisi	Qabala, Azerbaijan
22:00 AZST (UTC+5)	Vernydub (yellow card) 37'; Florescu (yellow card) 49'; Huseynov (yellow card) 54'; Zenjov 88'; Antonov 90+3'	Report	Totadze (red card) 71'	Stadium: Gabala City Stadium; Attendance: 4,400; Referee: Amaury Delerue (France)

16 July 2015 Second qualifying round 1st leg	Čukarički (Serbia)	1 – 0	(Azerbaijan) Gabala	Belgrade, Serbia
23:30 AZST (UTC+5)	Stojiljković 53' (pen.); Brežančić (yellow card) 69'	Report	Florescu (yellow card) 21'; Santos (yellow card) 25'; U.Abbasov (yellow card) 61'; Vernydub (yellow card) 74'; Huseynov (yellow card) 80'	Stadium: Stadion Čukarički; Attendance: 3,550; Referee: Radu Petrescu (Romania)

23 July 2015 Second qualifying round 2nd leg	Gabala (Azerbaijan)	2 – 0 (2 – 1 agg.)	(Serbia) Čukarički	Baku^{2}, Azerbaijan
21:00 AZST (UTC+5)	Zenjov 39', 53' (yellow card) 81'; Santos (yellow card) 67'; Gai (yellow card) 90+4'	Report	Piasentin (yellow card) 90+3'	Stadium: Bakcell Arena; Attendance: 8,500; Referee: Radek Příhoda (Czech Republic)

30 July 2015 Third qualifying round 1st leg	Apollon Limassol (Cyprus)	1 – 1	(Azerbaijan) Gabala	Larnaca^{3}, Cyprus
22:00 AZST (UTC+5)	Kolokoudias 14'; Elízio (yellow card) 54'; Lopes (yellow card) 69'; Freire (yellow card) 90+2'	Report	U.Abbasov (yellow card) 62'; Ricardinho (yellow card) 75'; Stanković (yellow card) 88'; Huseynov 90+5' (pen.)	Stadium: Antonis Papadopoulos Stadium; Attendance: 4,540; Referee: Serhiy Boyko (Ukraine)

6 August 2015 Third qualifying round 2nd leg	Gabala (Azerbaijan)	1 – 0 (2 – 1 agg.)	(Cyprus) Apollon Limassol	Baku^{2}, Azerbaijan
21:00 AZST (UTC+5)	Huseynov (yellow card) 35' (goal) 80' (pen.); U.Abbasov (red card) 90+1'	Report	Alexandre (yellow card) 31'; Papoulis (yellow card) 34'; Jaime (yellow card) 58'; Freire (yellow card) 69'; Sachetti (yellow card) 79'; Vale (yellow card) 80'; Guié (yellow card) 90+1'	Stadium: Bakcell Arena; Attendance: 9,500; Referee: Duarte Gomes (Portugal)

20 August 2015 Playoff round 1st leg	Gabala (Azerbaijan)	0 – 0	(Greece) Panathinaikos	Baku^{2}, Azerbaijan
21:00 AZST (UTC+5)	Santos (yellow card) 49'; Antonov (yellow card) 83'	Report	Zeca (yellow card) 31'; Wemmer (yellow card) 63'	Stadium: Bakcell Arena; Attendance: 10,950; Referee: Andre Marriner (England)

27 August 2015 Playoff round 2nd leg	Panathinaikos (Greece)	2 – 2 (2 – 2(a) agg.)	(Azerbaijan) Gabala	Athens, Greece
23:00 AZST (UTC+5)	Berg 35' (yellow card) 40'; Zeca (yellow card) 52'; Nano (yellow card) 73' (goal) 78'; Tavlaridis (yellow card) 90+1'	Report	Dodô 6', 60'; Vernydub (yellow card) 39'; Gai (yellow card) 62'; Ricardinho (yellow card) 78'	Stadium: Leoforos Alexandras Stadium; Attendance: 13,956; Referee: Ivan Kružliak (Slovakia)

==== Group stage ====
Pos	Team	Pld	W	D	L	GF	GA	GD	Pts	Qualification
1	(Russia) Krasnodar	6	4	1	1	9	4	+5	13	Advance to knockout phase
2	(Germany) Borussia Dortmund	6	3	1	2	10	5	+5	10	Advance to knockout phase
3	(Greece) PAOK	6	1	4	1	3	3	0	7	
4	(Azerbaijan) Gabala	6	0	2	4	2	12	−10	2	

Source: Soccerway
Rules for classification: Group stage tiebreakers

17 September 2015 1	Gabala (Azerbaijan)	0 – 0	(Greece) PAOK	Baku^{4}, Azerbaijan
22:00 AZST (UTC+5)	Dodô (yellow card) 69'; Antonov (yellow card) 90'	Report	Rodrigues (yellow card) 31'; Tzavellas (yellow card) 45'	Stadium: Bakcell Arena; Attendance: 7,500; Referee: Javier Estrada Fernández (Spain)

2 October 2015 2	Krasnodar (Russia)	2 – 1	(Azerbaijan) Gabala	Krasnodar, Russia
00:05 AZST (UTC+5)	Wánderson 8'; Jędrzejczyk (yellow card) 73'; Granqvist (yellow card) 82'; Smolov 84'; Ahmedov (yellow card) 87'	Report	Pereyra (yellow card) 45'; Dodô 51'; Stanković (yellow card) 80'; Bezotosnyi (yellow card) 81'; Sadiqov (yellow card) 88'	Stadium: Kuban Stadium; Attendance: 8,901; Referee: Marcin Borski (Poland)

22 October 2015 3	Gabala (Azerbaijan)	1 – 3	(Germany) Borussia Dortmund	Baku^{4}, Azerbaijan
20:00 AZST (UTC+5)	Stanković (yellow card) 68'; S.Zargarov (yellow card) 86'; Dodô 90+3'	Report	Aubameyang 31', 38', 72'; Papastathopoulos (yellow card) 47'; Bender (yellow card) 83'	Stadium: Bakcell Arena; Attendance: 10,500; Referee: Ivan Bebek (Croatia)

5 November 2015 4	Borussia Dortmund (Germany)	4 – 0	(Azerbaijan) Gabala	Dortmund, Germany
22:00 AZT (UTC+4)	Bender (yellow card) 14'; Reus 28'; Aubameyang 45'; Zenjov 67' (o.g.); Mkhitaryan 70'	Report	Vernydub (yellow card) 8'; Meza (yellow card) 71'; Jamalov (yellow card) 86'; S.Zargarov (yellow card) 90+2'	Stadium: Signal Iduna Park; Attendance: 57,000; Referee: Sébastien Delferière (Belgium)

27 November 2015 5	PAOK (Greece)	0 – 0	(Azerbaijan) Gabala	Thessaloniki, Greece
00:05 AZT (UTC+4)		Report		Stadium: Toumba Stadium; Attendance: 6,131; Referee: Jakob Kehlet (Denmark)

10 December 2015 6	Gabala (Azerbaijan)	0 – 3	(Russia) Krasnodar	Baku^{4}, Azerbaijan
22:00 AZT (UTC+4)	Dodô (yellow card) 24'	Report	Kaboré (yellow card) 9'; Sigurðsson 26'; Pereyra 40'; Wánderson 75'	Stadium: Bakcell Arena; Attendance: 3,000; Referee: István Kovács (Romania)

== Squad statistics ==
As of Match played 20 May 2016

=== Appearances and goals ===
No.	Pos	Nat	Player	Total		Premier League		Azerbaijan Cup		Europa League	
No.	Pos	Nat	Player	Apps	Goals	Apps	Goals	Apps	Goals	Apps	Goals
1	GK	(Azerbaijan) AZE	Andrey Popovich	10	0	8	0	1	0	1	0
3	DF	(Serbia) SRB	Vojislav Stanković	39	0	22+2	0	3+1	0	11	0
4	MF	(Azerbaijan) AZE	Elvin Jamalov	37	0	29	0	4+1	0	0+3	0
5	DF	(Azerbaijan) AZE	Pavlo Pashayev	2	0	1	0	0+1	0	0	0
6	MF	(Azerbaijan) AZE	Rashad Sadiqov	42	2	23+4	1	3	1	8+4	0
7	FW	(Bosnia and Herzegovina) BIH	Ermin Zec	36	10	16+7	7	3+1	3	4+5	0
8	MF	(Azerbaijan) AZE	Magomed Mirzabekov	29	0	18+7	0	2+1	0	0+1	0
9	FW	(Estonia) EST	Sergei Zenjov	42	5	22+4	2	2	0	14	3
10	FW	(Brazil) BRA	Dodô	34	7	18+1	2	2	1	8+5	4
11	MF	(Azerbaijan) AZE	Asif Mammadov	26	3	12+7	2	3+1	1	0+3	0
13	DF	(Azerbaijan) AZE	Murad Musayev	1	0	1	0	0	0	0	0
15	DF	(Ukraine) UKR	Vitaliy Vernydub	22	0	11	0	3	0	8	0
18	MF	(Azerbaijan) AZE	Vadim Abdullayev	1	0	1	0	0	0	0	0
19	MF	(Ukraine) UKR	Oleksiy Gai	53	14	34+1	10	4	4	14	0
20	DF	(Brazil) BRA	Ricardinho	32	1	11+5	0	2+1	1	13	0
21	DF	(Azerbaijan) AZE	Arif Dashdemirov	46	1	27+3	1	2	0	10+4	0
22	GK	(Ukraine) UKR	Dmytro Bezotosnyi	44	0	28	0	4	0	12	0
25	MF	(Azerbaijan) AZE	Qismət Alıyev	7	0	5+1	0	1	0	0	0
32	FW	(Azerbaijan) AZE	Rashad Eyyubov	21	2	7+10	1	1+3	1	0	0
33	GK	(Poland) POL	Dawid Pietrzkiewicz	2	0	0+1	0	0	0	1	0
34	DF	(Azerbaijan) AZE	Urfan Abbasov	30	0	18+3	0	3	0	6	0
44	DF	(Brazil) BRA	Rafael Santos	33	2	20	2	2+1	0	10	0
66	MF	(Azerbaijan) AZE	Samir Zargarov	38	4	16+10	3	3	1	3+6	0
69	FW	(Ukraine) UKR	Oleksiy Antonov	49	8	19+13	7	2+1	0	14	1
77	MF	(Azerbaijan) AZE	Ehtiram Şahverdiyev	2	0	0+1	0	0+1	0	0	0
87	DF	(Azerbaijan) AZE	Ruslan Abışov	19	0	17	0	2	0	0	0
97	FW	(Azerbaijan) AZE	Roman Huseynov	4	0	0+3	0	0+1	0	0	0
Players away from Gabala on loan:
Players who appeared for Gabala no longer at the club:
5	MF	(Romania) ROU	George Florescu	4	0	1	0	0	0	3	0
14	FW	(Azerbaijan) AZE	Javid Huseynov	6	3	0	0	0	0	6	3
32	FW	(Argentina) ARG	Facundo Pereyra	20	5	7+7	4	1	1	3+2	0
70	FW	(Azerbaijan) AZE	Vagif Javadov	5	1	2+1	0	0+1	1	0+1	0
88	MF	(Paraguay) PAR	David Meza	10	1	2+2	0	1	1	5	0

=== Goal scorers ===
Place	Position	Nation	Number	Name	Premier League	Azerbaijan Cup	Europa League	Total
1	MF	(Ukraine)	19	Oleksiy Gai	10	4	0	14
2	FW	(Bosnia and Herzegovina)	7	Ermin Zec	7	3	0	10
3	FW	(Ukraine)	69	Oleksiy Antonov	7	0	1	8
4	FW	(Brazil)	10	Dodô	2	1	4	7
5	FW	(Argentina)	32	Facundo Pereyra	4	1	0	5
5	FW	(Estonia)	9	Sergei Zenjov	2	0	3	5
7	MF	(Azerbaijan)	66	Samir Zargarov	3	1	0	4
8	MF	(Azerbaijan)	11	Asif Mammadov	2	1	0	3
8	FW	(Azerbaijan)	14	Javid Huseynov	0	0	3	3
10	DF	(Brazil)	44	Rafael Santos	2	0	0	2
10				Own goal	2	0	0	2
10	FW	(Azerbaijan)	32	Rashad Eyyubov	1	1	0	2
10	MF	(Azerbaijan)	6	Rashad Sadiqov	1	1	0	2
14	DF	(Azerbaijan)	21	Arif Dashdemirov	1	0	0	1
14	MF	(Paraguay)	88	David Meza	0	1	0	1
14	DF	(Brazil)	20	Ricardinho	0	1	0	1
14	FW	(Azerbaijan)	70	Vagif Javadov	0	1	0	1
				TOTALS	44	16	11	71

=== Disciplinary record ===
Number	Nation	Position	Name	Premier League		Azerbaijan Cup		Europa League		Total	
Number	Nation	Position	Name	Yellow card	Red card	Yellow card	Red card	Yellow card	Red card	Yellow card	Red card
3	(Serbia)	DF	Vojislav Stanković	6	0	0	0	3	0	9	0
4	(Azerbaijan)	MF	Elvin Jamalov	8	0	1	0	1	0	10	0
6	(Azerbaijan)	MF	Rashad Sadiqov	4	1	2	1	1	0	7	2
7	(Bosnia and Herzegovina)	FW	Ermin Zec	8	0	1	0	0	0	9	0
8	(Azerbaijan)	MF	Magomed Mirzabekov	4	0	0	0	0	0	4	0
9	(Estonia)	FW	Sergei Zenjov	1	0	1	0	1	0	3	0
10	(Brazil)	FW	Dodô	1	0	0	0	2	0	3	0
11	(Azerbaijan)	MF	Asif Mammadov	4	0	1	0	0	0	5	0
15	(Ukraine)	DF	Vitaliy Vernydub	6	0	0	0	5	0	11	0
19	(Ukraine)	DF	Oleksiy Gai	5	0	1	0	2	0	8	0
20	(Brazil)	DF	Ricardinho	3	0	0	0	2	0	5	0
21	(Azerbaijan)	DF	Arif Dashdemirov	4	0	0	0	0	0	4	0
22	(Ukraine)	GK	Dmytro Bezotosnyi	0	0	0	0	1	0	1	0
32	(Azerbaijan)	FW	Rashad Eyyubov	1	0	0	0	0	0	1	0
34	(Azerbaijan)	DF	Urfan Abbasov	5	0	0	0	2	1	7	1
44	(Brazil)	DF	Rafael Santos	6	0	0	0	3	0	9	0
66	(Azerbaijan)	MF	Samir Zargarov	4	0	1	0	2	0	7	0
69	(Ukraine)	FW	Oleksiy Antonov	5	0	0	0	2	0	7	0
87	(Azerbaijan)	DF	Ruslan Abışov	3	0	0	0	0	0	3	0
Players who left Gabala during the season:
5	(Romania)	MF	George Florescu	0	0	0	0	3	0	3	0
14	(Azerbaijan)	FW	Javid Huseynov	0	0	0	0	3	0	3	0
32	(Argentina)	FW	Facundo Pereyra	0	0	0	0	1	0	1	0
88	(Paraguay)	MF	David Meza	0	0	0	0	1	0	1	0
			TOTALS	78	1	8	1	35	1	121	3

== Notes ==
- Qarabağ have played their home games at the Tofiq Bahramov Stadium since 1993 due to the ongoing situation in Quzanlı.
- Gabala played their second & third qualifying round home matches at the Bakcell Arena, Baku, instead of their regular stadium City Stadium, Qabala, due to a punishment by UEFA.
- Apollon Limassol play their home matches at Antonis Papadopoulos Stadium, Larnaca, instead of their regular stadium Tsirion Stadium, Limassol.
- Gabala played their home matches at Bakcell Arena, Baku instead of their regular stadium, Gabala City Stadium, Qabala.
- The match between Gabala and Kapaz on 31 October 2015, was suspended in 29th minute due to server fog. The remainder of the game was played the next day, 1 November 2015, at 20:00.
