= Jure Čolak =

Croatian-German footballer

Personal information
- Date of birth: August 21, 1989 (age 37)
- Place of birth: Split, Yugoslavia
- Height: 1.94 m (6 ft 4 in)
- Position: Centre back

Team information
- Current team: FC Gießen
- Number: 2

Youth career
- SGV Freiberg
- Stuttgarter Kickers
- –2008: VfB Stuttgart

Senior career*
Years	Team	Apps	(Gls)
2008–2009	Kaiserslautern II	13	(0)
2010–2011	1860 Munich II	32	(1)
2011–2013	Waldhof Mannheim	53	(6)
2013–2014	Wacker Burghausen	20	(0)
2014–2015	Wiedenbrück 2000	33	(1)
2016	Steinbach	14	(0)
2016–2017	Homburg	19	(2)
2017	Shkëndija	14	(0)
2017–2018	Siah Jamegan	4	(0)
2019	Wormatia Worms	11	(1)
2019–	FC Gießen	13	(0)

International career
2007–2009	Croatia U19	15	(1)
- * Club domestic league appearances and goals as of 15:41, 11 November 2020 (UTC)

Jure Čolak (born August 21, 1989) is a Croatian-German footballer who currently plays for FC Gießen in the Regionalliga Südwest. He is the brother of Antonio-Mirko Čolak.

== Club career ==
=== Wormatia Worms ===
On 7 January 2019, Wormatia Worms announced the signing of Čolak.
