= 2007–08 FK Khazar Lankaran season =

Khazar Lankaran
2007–08 season
- President: Mubariz Mansimov
- Manager: Agaselim Mirjavadov
- Stadium: Lankaran City Stadium
- Premier League: 4th
- Azerbaijan Cup: Winners
- UEFA Champions League: 1st Qualifying round vs Dinamo Zagreb
- Top goalscorer: Zaur Ramazanov (11)
Home colours	Away colours

The Khazar Lankaran 2007–08 season was Khazar Lankaran's third Azerbaijan Premier League season. It was their second season under the management of Agaselim Mirjavadov. They finished 4th in the league and won the Azerbaijan Cup in extra-time against Inter Baku.

== Squad ==
Note: Flags indicate national team as defined under FIFA eligibility rules; some limited exceptions apply. Players may hold more than one non-FIFA nationality.

No.	Pos.	Nation	Player
1	GK	AZE	Dmitriy Kramarenko
3	DF	BRA	Denis Silva
4	DF	AZE	Mahir Shukurov
5	DF	AZE	Emin Quliyev
6	DF	AZE	Fizuli Mammedov
7	DF	AZE	Ruslan Poladov
8	MF	AZE	Elmar Bakhshiev
9	MF	AZE	Jeyhun Sultanov
10	MF	AZE	Zaur Ramazanov
11	MF	AZE	Rashad Karimov
12	GK	AZE	Ramiz Kerimov

No.	Pos.	Nation	Player
14	MF	AZE	Rahid Amirguliev
17	MF	AZE	Nadir Nabiyev
18	MF	AZE	Alim Gurbanov
19	DF	BUL	Kostadin Dzhambazov
21	MF	BUL	Radomir Todorov
25	GK	AZE	Kamran Agayev
27	MF	AZE	Rashad Abdullayev
30	MF	BRA	Mario Sergio
33	MF	BRA	Diego Souza
50	FW	CIV	Yacouba Bamba
55	MF	BRA	Juninho

== Transfers ==
=== Summer ===
In: Note: Flags indicate national team as defined under FIFA eligibility rules; some limited exceptions apply. Players may hold more than one non-FIFA nationality.

No.	Pos.	Nation	Player
8	MF	AZE	Elmar Bakhshiev (from (Azerbaijan) Inter Baku)
12	GK	AZE	Ramiz Kerimov
19	DF	BUL	Kostadin Dzhambazov (from (Bulgaria) Slavia Sofia)
21	MF	BUL	Radomir Todorov (from (Bulgaria) Naftex Burgas)
50	FW	CIV	Yacouba Bamba (from (Azerbaijan) Karvan)
55	MF	BRA	Juninho (from (Brazil) Brasilis)
—	DF	AZE	Zaur Hashimov (from (Azerbaijan) Inter Baku)
—	DF	AZE	Amid Huseynov (from Youth Team)

Out: Note: Flags indicate national team as defined under FIFA eligibility rules; some limited exceptions apply. Players may hold more than one non-FIFA nationality.

No.	Pos.	Nation	Player
1	GK	AZE	Mikayil Yusifov (to (Turkey) Kartalspor)
3	DF	AZE	Adehim Niftaliyev (to (Azerbaijan) Masallı)
4	DF	GEO	Valeri Abramidze (to (Russia) Anzhi Makhachkala)
7	MF	AZE	Mahmud Qurbanov (to (Azerbaijan) Inter Baku)
8	MF	AZE	Ilgar Gurbanov (to (Turkey) Sivasspor)
9	MF	ROU	Róbert Ilyés (to (Romania) Brașov)
21	DF	BLR	Syarhey Pawlyukovich (to (Belarus) Dinamo Minsk)
—	DF	COL	Rodriqo Rosa Sales
—	FW	BRA	Osmar Sigueira (to (Azerbaijan) Masallı)

=== Winter ===
In: Note: Flags indicate national team as defined under FIFA eligibility rules; some limited exceptions apply. Players may hold more than one non-FIFA nationality.

No.	Pos.	Nation	Player
3	DF	BRA	Denis Silva (from (Brazil) Gama)
4	DF	AZE	Mahir Shukurov (from (Azerbaijan) Inter Baku)
7	DF	AZE	Ruslan Poladov (from (Azerbaijan) Standard Baku)
17	FW	AZE	Nadir Nabiyev (from (Azerbaijan) Neftchi Baku)
30	MF	BRA	Mario Sergio (from (Brazil) Portuguesa)
33	MF	BRA	Diego Souza (from (Brazil) Brasilis)
—	FW	BRA	Roberto Santos (from (Brazil) Paulista)

Out: Note: Flags indicate national team as defined under FIFA eligibility rules; some limited exceptions apply. Players may hold more than one non-FIFA nationality.

No.	Pos.	Nation	Player
3	DF	AZE	Adehim Niftaliyev (to (Azerbaijan) Masallı)
20	FW	GHA	Edmond N'Tiamoah (to (Switzerland) Servette)
28	DF	LTU	Darius Žutautas
—	DF	AZE	Zaur Hashimov (to (Azerbaijan) Qarabağ)
—	DF	AZE	Amid Huseynov (to (Azerbaijan) Masallı)
—	FW	AZE	Vüqar Nadirov (loan to (Azerbaijan) Masallı)

== Competitions ==
=== Azerbaijan Premier League ===
==== Results ====
12 August 2007 1	Karvan	0 – 1	Khazar Lankaran	Yevlakh
17:00 AZST (UTC+5)		Summary	Bamba 36'	Stadium: Yevlakh Stadium

18 August 2007 2	Masallı	0 – 3	Khazar Lankaran	Masallı
17:00 AZST (UTC+5)		Summary	Bamba 44', 54'; Ramazanov 88'	Stadium: Anatoliy Banishevskiy Stadium

26 August 2007 3	Khazar Lankaran	2 – 0	Qarabağ	Lankaran
19:00 AZST (UTC+5)	Bakhshiev 35'; Juninho 61'	Summary		Stadium: Lankaran City Stadium

2 September 2007 4	ABN Bärdä	0 – 4	Khazar Lankaran	Barda
18:00 AZST (UTC+5)		Summary		Stadium: Barda City Stadium

16 September 2007 5	Khazar Lankaran	2 – 0	Turan Tovuz	Lankaran
18:00 AZST (UTC+5)	Quliyev 1', 41'	Summary		Stadium: Lankaran City Stadium

23 September 2007 6	Gänclärbirliyi Sumqayit	1 – 2	Khazar Lankaran	Sumgayit
17:00 AZST (UTC+5)	E.Nuriyev 63'	Summary	N'Tiamoah 25', 50'	Stadium: Mehdi Huseynzade Stadium

30 September 2007 7	Khazar Lankaran	2 – 1	Gabala	Lankaran
18:00 AZST (UTC+5)	Ramazanov 21'; Quliyev 90'	Summary	Aptsiauri 37'	Stadium: Lankaran City Stadium

6 October 2007 8	Inter Baku	2 – 2	Khazar Lankaran	Baku
15:00 AZST (UTC+5)	Imamaliev 37'; Zagorac 87'	Summary	Abdullayev 16'; N'Tiamoah 55'	Stadium: Zabrat Stadium

28 October 2007 9	Khazar Lankaran	2 – 2	Standard Baku	Yevlakh
21:25 AZT (UTC+4)	N'Tiamoah 25'; Todorov 82'	Summary	Rocha 35'; M.Vintilă 55'	Stadium: Yevlakh Stadium

4 November 2007 10	Baku	2 – 2	Khazar Lankaran	Baku
15:00 AZT (UTC+4)	Gomes 41' (pen.); Pérez 56'	Summary	Juninho 4'; Ramazanov 31'	Stadium: Tofig Bakhramov Stadium

10 November 2007 11	Khazar Lankaran	0 – 1	Neftchi Baku	Lankaran
15:00 AZT (UTC+4)		Summary	Adamia 1'	Stadium: Lankaran City Stadium

25 November 2007 12	Olimpik Baku	0 – 0	Khazar Lankaran	Baku
15:00 AZT (UTC+4)		Summary		Stadium: Shafa Stadium

2 December 2007 13	Khazar Lankaran	2 – 1	Simurq	Lankaran
15:00 AZT (UTC+4)	Abdullayev 50'; Ramazanov 60'	Summary	A.Danayev 85' (pen.)	Stadium: Lankaran City Stadium

17 December 2007 14	Khazar Lankaran	0 – 0	Karvan	Lankaran
15:00 AZT (UTC+4)		Summary		Stadium: Lankaran City Stadium

23 February 2008 15	Khazar Lankaran	4 – 1	Masallı	Lankaran
15:00 AZT (UTC+4)	Diego Souza 10'; Ramazanov 15', 78'; Lomaşvili 75' (o.g.)	Summary	Hashimov 82'	Stadium: Lankaran City Stadium

2 March 2008 16	Qarabağ	2 – 0	Khazar Lankaran	Baku
15:00 AZT (UTC+4)	Javadov 4'; Gashimov 13'	Summary		Stadium: Tofig Bakhramov Stadium

16 March 2008 17	Khazar Lankaran	0 – 0	ABN Bärdä	Lankaran
15:00 AZT (UTC+4)		Summary		Stadium: Lankaran City Stadium

29 March 2008 18	Khazar Lankaran	5 – 0	Gänclärbirliyi Sumqayit	Lankaran
16:00 AZT (UTC+4)	Ramazanov 10'; Mario Sergio 23'; Nabiyev 46', 66', 90'	Summary		Stadium: Lankaran City Stadium

5 April 2008 19	Gabala	1 – 1	Khazar Lankaran	Qabala
16:00 AZST (UTC+5)	Mamedov 72'	Summary	Ramazanov 10'	Stadium: Gabala City Stadium

13 April 2008 20	Khazar Lankaran	3 – 1	Inter Baku	Lankaran
18:00 AZST (UTC+5)	Amirguliev 45'; Mario Sergio 70'; Abdullayev 80'	Summary	Guglielmone 14'	Stadium: Lankaran City Stadium

20 April 2008 21	Standard Baku	0 – 1	Khazar Lankaran	Baku
16:00 AZST (UTC+5)		Summary	Mario Sergio 45'	Stadium: Shafa Stadium

27 April 2008 22	Turan Tovuz	0 – 4	Khazar Lankaran	Tovuz
16:00 AZST (UTC+5)		Summary	Mario Sergio 17'; Bamba 20'; Bakhshiev 60'; Ramazanov 78'	Stadium: Tovuz City Stadium

4 May 2008 23	Khazar Lankaran	0 – 0	Baku	Lankaran
18:00 AZST (UTC+5)		Summary		Stadium: Lankaran City Stadium

11 May 2008 24	Neftchi Baku	0 – 1	Khazar Lankaran	Baku
20:00 AZST (UTC+5)		Summary	Abdullayev 14'	Stadium: Tofiq Bahramov Stadium

17 May 2008 25	Khazar Lankaran	0 – 0	Olimpik Baku	Lankaran
18:00 AZST (UTC+5)		Summary		Stadium: Lankaran City Stadium

28 May 2008 26	Simurq	1 – 1	Khazar Lankaran	Zaqatala
17:00 AZST (UTC+5)	Bolkvadze 20'	Summary	Ramazanov 10'	Stadium: Zaqatala City Stadium

==== Table ====
Pos	Team	Pld	W	D	L	GF	GA	GD	Pts	Qualification or relegation
2	Olimpik Baku	26	17	7	2	29	7	+22	58	Qualification for UEFA Cup first qualifying round (Note: Khazar Lankaran qualified for the first qualifiying round of the 1st qualifying round of the UEFA Cup as winners of the 2007–08 Azerbaijan Cup.)
3	Neftçi Baku	26	16	7	3	42	18	+24	55	Qualification for Intertoto Cup first round
4	Khazar Lankaran	26	14	10	2	44	16	+28	52	Qualification for UEFA Cup first qualifying round
5	Qarabağ	26	11	8	7	25	16	+9	41	
6	Gabala	26	11	3	12	33	36	−3	36	

Source: Azerbaijan Professional Football league
Rules for classification: 1) points; 2) goal difference; 3) number of goals scored.

=== Azerbaijan Cup ===
26 September 2007 1st Round 1st Leg	NBC Salyan	1 – 3	Khazar Lankaran	Salyan
		[ Summary]		Stadium: Salyan Olympic Sport Complex Stadium

3 October 2007 1st Round 2nd Leg	Khazar Lankaran	7 – 2 (10 – 3 agg.)	NBC Salyan	Lankaran
		[ Summary]		Stadium: Lankaran City Stadium

24 October 2007 Round of 16 1st Leg	Gänclärbirliyi Sumqayit	1 – 4	Khazar Lankaran	Sumgayit
	S.Musaev 18'	Summary	A.Gurbanov 10'; Quliyev 33'; N'Tiamoah 37'; Abdullayev 60'	Stadium: Mehdi Huseynzade Stadium

31 October 2007 Round of 16 2nd Leg	Khazar Lankaran	5 – 0 (9 – 1^{1} agg.)	Gänclärbirliyi Sumqayit	Lankaran
	Nadirov 22', 55', 86'; N'Tiamoah 41'; Sultanov 78'	Summary		Stadium: Lankaran City Stadium

6 March 2008 Quarterfinals 1st Leg	Khazar Lankaran	0 – 1	Olimpik Baku	Lankaran
15:00 AZT (UTC+4)		Summary	Parkhachev 14'	Stadium: Lankaran City Stadium

19 March 2008 Quarterfinals 2nd Leg	Olimpik Baku	0 – 2 (1 – 2 agg.)	Khazar Lankaran	Baku
17:00 AZT (UTC+4)		Summary		Stadium: Shafa Stadium

9 April 2008 Semifinals 1st Leg	Gabala	1 – 3	Khazar Lankaran	Qabala
17:00 AZST (UTC+5)	Huseynov 75'	Summary; Summary	Ramazanov 12', 56'; Vashakidze 15' (o.g.)	Stadium: Gabala City Stadium

23 April 2008 Semifinals 2nd Leg	Khazar Lankaran	1 – 1 (4 – 2 agg.)	Gabala	Lankaran
18:00 AZST (UTC+5)	Amirguliyev 81'	Summary; Summary	Camara 25'	Stadium: Lankaran City Stadium

==== Final ====
24 May 2008	Khazar Lankaran	2 – 0 (a.e.t.)	Inter Baku	Baku
AZST (UTC+5)	Juninho 115', 118'	[ Summary]		Stadium: Tofiq Bahramov Stadium; Attendance: 18,000

Source: Cup Results

=== CIS Cup ===
==== Group stage ====
Team	Pld	W	D	L	GF	GA	GD	Pts
(Azerbaijan) Khazar Lankaran	3	2	0	1	5	2	+3	6
(Lithuania) FBK Kaunas	3	2	0	1	9	6	+3	6
(Kazakhstan) Aktobe	3	2	0	1	8	4	+4	6
(Tajikistan) Regar-TadAZ Tursunzoda	3	0	0	3	2	12	−10	0

Source: RSSSF

19 January 2008 1	Khazar Lankaran (Azerbaijan)	3 – 0	(Lithuania) FBK Kaunas	Saint Petersburg, Russia
	Poladov 47'; Ramazanov 50'; Diego Souza 66'	Report	Gaúcho (yellow card) 28' (yellow-red card) 36'	Attendance: 1,000; Referee: Lasha Silagava (Georgia)

20 January 2008 2	Khazar Lankaran (Azerbaijan)	2 – 1	(Tajikistan) Regar-TadAZ Tursunzoda	Saint Petersburg, Russia
	Nabiyev 55', 65'	Report	Ortikov 4'	Attendance: 1,000; Referee: Emil Busurmankulov (Kyrgyzstan)

22 January 2008 3	Aktobe (Kazakhstan)	1 – 0	(Azerbaijan) Khazar Lankaran	Saint Petersburg, Russia
	Ashirbekov 90' (pen.)	Report		Attendance: 1,000; Referee: Aleksandr Gvardis (Russia)

==== Knockout stage ====
23 January 2008 Quarter-finals	Khazar Lankaran (Azerbaijan)	2 – 2 (a.e.t.) (5 – 3 p)	(Moldova) Sheriff Tiraspol	Saint Petersburg, Russia
	Mario Sergio 53', 90'	Report	Gnanou 35'; Balima 64'; Kuchuk (yellow card) 53' (yellow-red card) 64'	Attendance: 2,000; Referee: Lasha Silagava (Ukraine)
	Penalties
	Quliyev (penalty scored); Diego Souza (penalty scored); Ramazanov (penalty scored); Sultanov (penalty scored); Mario Sergio (penalty scored)		Tarkhnishvili (penalty missed); Chinwo (penalty scored); Wallace (penalty scored); Gnanou (penalty scored)

25 January 2008 Semi-final	Khazar Lankaran (Azerbaijan)	2 – 1	(Belarus) BATE Borisov	Saint Petersburg, Russia
	Amirguliev 71', 88'	Report	Radzivonau 72'	Attendance: 1,000; Referee: Andrejs Sipailo (Latvia)

27 January 2008 Final	Khazar Lankaran (Azerbaijan)	4 – 3	(Uzbekistan) Pakhtakor Tashkent	Saint Petersburg, Russia
	Amirguliev 6'; Ramazanov 43'; Diego Souza 49'; Mario Sergio 65'	Report	Magdeev 3'; Soliev 27'; Inomov 57'	Attendance: 6,000; Referee: Nikolai Ivanov (Russia)

=== UEFA Champions League ===
==== Qualifying rounds ====
17 July 2007 1st qualifying round 1st Leg	Khazar Lankaran (Azerbaijan)	1 – 1	(Croatia) Dinamo Zagreb	Baku
18:00 AZST (UTC+5)	Ramazanov 58'; Quliyev (red card) 73'	Summary	Etto 63'	Stadium: Tofiq Bahramov Stadium; Referee: Meir Levi (Israel)

24 July 2007 1st qualifying round 2nd Leg	Dinamo Zagreb (Croatia)	3 – 1 (a.e.t.) (4 – 2 agg.)	(Azerbaijan) Khazar Lankaran	Zagreb
23:15 AZST (UTC+5)	Vugrinec 56'; Mandžukić 99'; Tadić 116'	Summary	Juninho 16'; N'Tiamoah (yellow card) 57' (yellow-red card) 79'	Stadium: Stadion Maksimir; Referee: Bernardino González Vázquez (Spain)

== Squad statistics ==
=== Appearances and goals ===
No.	Pos	Nat	Player	Total		Premier League		Azerbaijan Cup		CIS Cup		UEFA Champions League	
No.	Pos	Nat	Player	Apps	Goals	Apps	Goals	Apps	Goals	Apps	Goals	Apps	Goals
1	GK	(Azerbaijan) AZE	Dmitriy Kramarenko	13	0	9	0	0	0	4	0	0	0
3	DF	(Brazil) BRA	Denis Silva	11	0	11	0	0	0	0	0	0	0
4	DF	(Azerbaijan) AZE	Mahir Shukurov	16	0	11	0	0	0	5	0	0	0
5	DF	(Azerbaijan) AZE	Emin Quliyev	20	3	14	3	0	0	5	0	1	0
6	DF	(Azerbaijan) AZE	Fizuli Mammedov	16	0	11	0	0	0	3	0	2	0
7	DF	(Azerbaijan) AZE	Ruslan Poladov	14	1	8	0	0	0	6	1	0	0
8	MF	(Azerbaijan) AZE	Elmar Bakhshiev	41	3	25	2	8	1	6	0	2	0
9	MF	(Azerbaijan) AZE	Jeyhun Sultanov	24	0	17	0	0	0	6	0	1	0
10	FW	(Azerbaijan) AZE	Zaur Ramazanov	33	16	25	11	0	2	6	2	2	1
11	MF	(Azerbaijan) AZE	Rashad Karimov	6	0	5	0	0	0	1	0	0	0
14	MF	(Azerbaijan) AZE	Rahid Amirguliev	24	5	16	1	0	1	6	3	2	0
17	FW	(Azerbaijan) AZE	Nadir Nabiyev	12	5	6	3	2	0	4	2	0	0
18	MF	(Azerbaijan) AZE	Alim Gurbanov	25	0	18	0	0	0	5	0	2	0
19	DF	(Bulgaria) BUL	Kostadin Dzhambazov	28	0	22	0	0	0	4	0	2	0
21	MF	(Bulgaria) BUL	Radomir Todorov	31	1	24	1	0	0	5	0	2	0
25	GK	(Azerbaijan) AZE	Kamran Agayev	21	0	17	0	0	0	2	0	2	0
27	MF	(Azerbaijan) AZE	Rashad Abdullayev	32	4	24	4	0	0	6	0	2	0
30	MF	(Brazil) BRA	Mario Sergio	16	8	10	4	0	1	6	3	0	0
33	MF	(Brazil) BRA	Diego Souza	15	5	10	1	0	2	5	2	0	0
50	FW	(Ivory Coast) CIV	Yacouba Bamba	16	5	14	5	0	0	0	0	2	0
55	MF	(Brazil) BRA	Juninho	13	7	11	3	0	3	0	0	2	1
	MF	(Brazil) BRA	Roberto Santos	5	0	5	0	0	0	0	0	0	0
Players who appeared for Khazar Lankaran who left on loan during the season:
17	FW	(Azerbaijan) AZE	Vüqar Nadirov	9	0	9	0	0	0	0	0	0	0
Players who appeared for Khazar Lankaran who left during the season:
3	DF	(Azerbaijan) AZE	Adehim Niftaliyev	0	0	0	0	0	0	0	0	0	0
20	FW	(Ghana) GHA	Edmond N'Tiamoah	13	5	12	5	0	0	0	0	1	0
28	DF	(Lithuania) LTU	Darius Žutautas	7	0	0	0	0	0	5	0	2	0
	DF	(Azerbaijan) AZE	Zaur Hashimov	14	0	11	0	3	0	0	0	0	0

=== Goal scorers ===
Place	Position	Nation	Number	Name	Premier League	Azerbaijan Cup	CIS Cup	UEFA Champions League	Total
1	FW	(Azerbaijan)	10	Zaur Ramazanov	11	2	2	1	16
2	MF	(Brazil)	30	Mario Sergio	4	1	3	0	8
2	FW	(Azerbaijan)		Nadir Nabiyev	3	3	2	0	8
4	MF	(Brazil)	55	Juninho	3	3	0	1	7
4	FW	(Ghana)	20	Edmond N'Tiamoah	5	2	0	0	7
6	FW	(Ivory Coast)	50	Yacouba Bamba	5	0	0	0	5
6	MF	(Brazil)	35	Diego Souza	1	2	2	0	5
6	MF	(Azerbaijan)	14	Rahid Amirguliev	1	1	3	0	5
6	MF	(Azerbaijan)	27	Rashad Abdullayev	4	1	0	0	5
10	DF	(Azerbaijan)	5	Emin Quliyev	3	1	0	0	4
11	MF	(Azerbaijan)	8	Elmar Bakhshiev	2	1	0	0	3
12	MF	(Bulgaria)	21	Radomir Todorov	1	0	0	0	1
12	MF	(Azerbaijan)	18	Alim Gurbanov	0	1	0	0	1
12	MF	(Azerbaijan)	9	Jeyhun Sultanov	0	1	0	0	1
12	DF	(Azerbaijan)	7	Ruslan Poladov	0	0	1	0	1
12				Own goal	1	1	0	0	1
12				Unknown	0	7	0	0	7
				TOTALS	44	27	13	2	86

== Notes ==
- Qarabağ have played their home games at the Tofiq Bahramov Stadium since 1993 due to the ongoing situation in Quzanlı.
