= 2006–07 FK Qarabağ season =

Qarabağ
2006–07 season
- Chairman: Tahir Gözal
- Manager: Boyukagha Aghayev till December 2006; Rasim Kara from December 2006
- Stadium: Guzanli Olympic Complex Stadium
- Premier League: 8th
- Azerbaijan Cup: Round of 16 vs Neftchi Baku
- UEFA Cup: First qualifying round vs Zimbru Chişinău
- Top goalscorer: Vagif Javadov; Kanan Karimov (4)
Home colours	Away colours

The Qarabağ 2006–07 season was Qarabağ's 14th Azerbaijan Premier League season. They finished the season in 8th place, were knocked out of the Azerbaijan Cup at the last 16 stage by Neftchi Baku and didn't progress beyond the First qualifying round of the UEFA Cup after losing to Zimbru Chişinău. Qarabağ started the season under the management of Boyukagha Aghayev, but he was replaced by Rasim Kara in December 2006 following the completion of the first half of the season.

== Squad ==
Note: Flags indicate national team as defined under FIFA eligibility rules; some limited exceptions apply. Players may hold more than one non-FIFA nationality.

No.	Pos.	Nation	Player
2	DF	AZE	Huseyn Isgandarov
3	DF	AZE	Azer Mammadov
7	DF	AZE	Ramal Huseynov
8	MF	AZE	Aslan Kerimov
12	GK	AZE	Jahangir Hasanzade
14	MF	AZE	Namiq Yusifov
16	DF	AZE	Samir Abbasov
17	DF	SRB	Bojan Ilic
20	FW	AZE	Kanan Karimov
23	MF	TUR	Hakan Demir
—	GK	AZE	Elchin Jafarov
—	GK	AZE	Osman Umarov

No.	Pos.	Nation	Player
—	DF	AZE	Mehran Əliyev
—	DF	AZE	Afran Ismayilov
—	DF	AZE	Nodar Mammadov
—	DF	AZE	Maksim Medvedev
—	DF	AZE	Rza Qafarlı
—	MF	GEO	Goga Beraia
—	MF	AZE	Tagim Novruzov
—	MF	AZE	İsabala İsrafilov
—	MF	AZE	Timur İsrafilov
—	FW	AZE	Rauf Aliyev
—	FW	AZE	Vagif Javadov

== Transfers ==
=== Summer ===
In: Note: Flags indicate national team as defined under FIFA eligibility rules; some limited exceptions apply. Players may hold more than one non-FIFA nationality.

No.	Pos.	Nation	Player
6	DF	AZE	Khalig Mardanov (from (Azerbaijan) Kapaz)
16	DF	AZE	Samir Abbasov (from (Azerbaijan) Karvan)
20	FW	AZE	Kanan Karimov (from (Azerbaijan) Karvan)
23	MF	TUR	Hakan Demir (from (Turkey) Gençlerbirliği)

Out: Note: Flags indicate national team as defined under FIFA eligibility rules; some limited exceptions apply. Players may hold more than one non-FIFA nationality.

No.	Pos.	Nation	Player
1	GK	AZE	Vitali Kovalyov (to (Azerbaijan) MKT Araz)
—	DF	AZE	Dmitri Spirin
—	DF	CRO	Blazenko Bekovac
—	DF	SRB	Zoran Çelinşek
—	DF	TUR	Mustafa Engin Özmən
—	MF	AZE	Azer Jabbarov (to (Azerbaijan) MKT Araz)
—	MF	LTU	Eqidius Yuşka
—	MF	UKR	Serhiy Kravchenko (to (Ukraine) Vorskla Poltava)
—	MF	UKR	Aleksandr Voskoboynik
—	FW	AZE	Farid Guliyev (to (Azerbaijan) Baku)
—	FW	AZE	Tərlan Mahmudov
—	FW	AZE	Dmitri Yeremeyev
—	FW	UKR	Denis Sokolovski (to (Ukraine) Krymteplytsia Molodizhne)

=== Winter ===
In: Note: Flags indicate national team as defined under FIFA eligibility rules; some limited exceptions apply. Players may hold more than one non-FIFA nationality.

No.	Pos.	Nation	Player
—	GK	AZE	Osman Umarov (from (Azerbaijan) Shahdag)
—	DF	AZE	Nodar Mammadov (from (Azerbaijan) Shahdag)
—	MF	AZE	Tagim Novruzov (from (Azerbaijan) Simurq)
—	MF	AZE	Timur İsrafilov (from (Azerbaijan) Shahdag)
—	MF	AZE	İsabala İsrafilov (from (Azerbaijan) Shahdag)

Out: Note: Flags indicate national team as defined under FIFA eligibility rules; some limited exceptions apply. Players may hold more than one non-FIFA nationality.

No.	Pos.	Nation	Player
4	DF	AZE	Vasif Hagverdiyev
5	DF	AZE	Sergei Sokolov (Banned)
6	DF	AZE	Khalig Mardanov
9	FW	AZE	Samir Musayev (tp (Azerbaijan) Baku)
10	FW	AZE	Mushfig Huseynov (Retired)
11	DF	AZE	Elmir Khankishiev
15	MF	AZE	Mubariz Orujov (to (Azerbaijan) Karvan)
18	DF	AZE	Ramiz Huseynov (to (Azerbaijan) Simurq)
—	MF	SRB	Slobodan Sladojevic

== Competitions ==
=== Azerbaijan Premier League ===
==== Results ====
10 August 2006 2	Qarabağ	3 – 1	Shahdag	Baku
	Musayev 46', 61', 78'	[ Summary]	Tijani 15'	Stadium: Tofik Bakhramov Stadium^{2}

19 August 2006 3	Gabala	0 – 2	Qarabağ	Qabala
		[ Summary]	Kerimov 29'; Haqverdiyev 88'	Stadium: Gabala City Stadium

18 September 2006 4	Neftchi Baku	0 – 0	Qarabağ	Baku
		[ Summary]		Stadium: Tofiq Bahramov Stadium

23 September 2006 5	Qarabağ	0 – 0	Simurq	Baku
	K.Mardanov 18'	[ Summary]	R.Mammadov 78'	Stadium: Tofiq Bahramov 37^{2} Attendance: 200

29 September 2006 6	Baku	0 – 0	Qarabağ	Baku
		[ Summary]		Stadium: Tofiq Bahramov Stadium; Attendance: 500

23 October 2006 7	Qarabağ	1 – 1	Olimpik Baku	Baku
	R.Huseynov 9'	[ Summary]	Muteba 57'	Stadium: Tofik Bakhramov Stadium^{2}

4 November 2006 9	Qarabağ	1 – 0	Gänclärbirliyi Sumqayit	Baku
	V.Hagverdiyev 15'	[ Summary]		Stadium: Tofik Bakhramov Stadium^{2}

9 November 2006 10	Khazar Lankaran	2 – 0	Qarabağ	Lankaran
	Abdullayev 57', 76'	[ Summary]		Stadium: Lankaran City Stadium; Attendance: 6,500

15 November 2006 1	Qarabağ	1 – 1	Karvan	Baku
	M.Huseynov 84'	[ Summary]	Mogaadi 90+3' (pen.)	Stadium: Tofik Bakhramov Stadium^{2}

26 November 2006 11	Qarabağ	0 – 1	Inter Baku	Baku
		[ Summary]	Alegbe 19'	Stadium: Tofik Bakhramov Stadium^{2} Attendance: 400

13 December 2006 8	Turan Tovuz	3 – 1	Qarabağ	Tovuz
	J.Huseynov 6'; Igbekoi 36'; A.Qädiri 80'	[ Summary]	M.Huseynov 12'	Stadium: Tovuz City Stadium; Attendance: 1,000

8 December 2006 12	MKT-Araz	1 – 0	Qarabağ	Imishli
	Doroș 29'	[ Summary]		Stadium: Heydar Aliyev Stadium; Attendance: 1,000

12 February 2007 13	Karvan	2 – 0	Qarabağ	Yevlakh
	Bamba 5', 55'	[ Summary]		Stadium: Yevlakh City Stadium

17 February 2007 14	Şahdağ	0 – 0	Qarabağ	Qusar
		[ Summary]		Stadium: Şövkət Orduxanov Stadium

21 February 2007 15	Qarabağ	3 – 2	Gabala	Baku
	Javadov 21'; K.Kerimov 25'; A.Kerimov 60'	[ Summary]	Äliyev 77'; Zargarov 82'	Stadium: Tofiq Bahramov Stadium^{2} Attendance: 500

3 April 2007 18	Qarabağ	1 – 1	Baku	Baku
	Pérez 75' (pen.)	[ Summary]	Beraia 45+1'	Stadium: Tofik Bakhramov Stadium^{2}

8 April 2007 19	Olimpik Baku	0 – 0	Qarabağ	Baku
		[ Summary]		Stadium: Shafa Stadium

18 April 2007 16	Qarabağ	1 – 1	Turan Tovuz	Baku
	K.Karimov 89'	[ Summary]	Ibekoyi 29'	Stadium: Tofik Bakhramov Stadium^{2} Attendance: 170

27 April 2007 17	Qarabağ	0 – 2	Neftchi Baku	Baku
		[ Summary]	Nabiyev 11'; Aliyev 45'	Stadium: Tofik Bakhramov Stadium^{2} Attendance: 2,500

2 May 2007 20	Gänclärbirliyi Sumqayit	0 – 3	Qarabağ	Sumgayit
		[ Summary]	Aliyev 50'; Javadov 57', 67'	Stadium: Mehdi Huseynzade Stadium; Attendance: 300

7 May 2007 21	Qarabağ	1 – 4	Khazar Lankaran	Baku
	K.Karimov 25'	[ Summary]	Ramazanov 29', 38'; N'Tiamoah 42', 68'	Stadium: Tofik Bakhramov Stadium^{2} Attendance: 2,000

12 May 2007 22	Simurq	3 – 0	Qarabağ	Zaqatala
	Mazyar 45', 53', 75'	[ Summary]		Stadium: Zaqatala City Stadium; Attendance: 500

18 May 2007 23	Inter Baku	1 – 0	Qarabağ	Baku
	Ražanauskas	[ Summary]		Stadium: Shafa Stadium

23 May 2007 24	Qarabağ	1 – 0	MKT-Araz	Baku
	Javadov 26'	[ Summary]		Stadium: Tofik Bakhramov Stadium^{2} Attendance: 200

==== Table ====
Pos	Team	Pld	W	D	L	GF	GA	GD	Pts
6	Olimpik Baku	24	11	8	5	28	17	+11	41
7	Karvan	24	10	5	9	36	30	+6	35
8	Qarabağ	24	6	9	9	20	27	−7	27
9	Simurq	24	6	7	11	27	33	−6	25
10	Turan	24	5	5	14	24	38	−14	20

Source: Azerbaijan Professional Football league

=== Azerbaijan Cup ===
12 September 2006 First Round 1st leg	MOIK Baku	0 – 2	Qarabağ	Lankaran
AZT (UTC+4)		[ Summary]	K.Karimov 22', 63'	Stadium: Lankaran City Stadium

17 October 2006 First Round 2nd leg	Qarabağ	4 – 0 (6 – 0 agg.)	MOIK Baku	Baku
AZT (UTC+4)		[ Summary]		Stadium: Tofik Bakhramov Stadium^{2}

21 November 2006 Last 16 1st leg	Qarabağ	1 – 2	Neftchi Baku	Baku
AZT (UTC+4)	Abbasov 64'	[ Summary]	Ismayilov 16'; Tagizade 62'	Stadium: Tofik Bakhramov Stadium^{2} Attendance: 1,000

3 December 2006 Last 16 2nd leg	Neftchi Baku	0 – 1 ((a)2 – 2 agg.)	Qarabağ	Baku
AZT (UTC+4)		[ Summary]	K.Karimov 66'	Stadium: Tofiq Bahramov Stadium; Attendance: 2,000

=== UEFA Cup ===
13 July 2006 1st qualifying round 1st leg	Zimbru Chişinău (Moldova)	1 – 1	(Azerbaijan) Qarabağ	Chişinău, Moldova
	Petrosyan 75'	Summary	Musayev 68'	Stadium: Zimbru Stadium; Referee: Dejan Delevic (Serbia)

27 July 2006 1st qualifying round 2nd leg	Qarabağ (Azerbaijan)	1 – 2 (a.e.t.) (2 – 3 agg.)	(Moldova) Zimbru Chişinău	Baku, Azerbaijan
	Musayev 23'	Summary	Chirilov 52'; Bălașa 100'	Stadium: Shafa Stadium; Referee: Rusmir Mrković (Bosnia and Herzegovina)

== Squad statistics ==
=== Appearances and goals ===
No.	Pos	Nat	Player	Total		Premier League		Azerbaijan Cup		UEFA Cup	
No.	Pos	Nat	Player	Apps	Goals	Apps	Goals	Apps	Goals	Apps	Goals
3	DF	(Azerbaijan) AZE	Azer Mammadov	6	0	5	0	0	0	1	0
2	DF	(Azerbaijan) AZE	Huseyn Isgandarov	16	0	15	0	0	0	1	0
7	MF	(Azerbaijan) AZE	Ramal Huseynov	13	1	11	1	0	0	2	0
8	DF	(Azerbaijan) AZE	Aslan Kerimov	22	1	20	1	0	0	2	0
12	GK	(Azerbaijan) AZE	Jahangir Hasanzade	22	0	20	0	0	0	2	0
14	MF	(Azerbaijan) AZE	Namiq Yusifov	20	0	18	0	0	0	2	0
16	DF	(Azerbaijan) AZE	Samir Abbasov	24	0	22	0	0	0	2	0
17	DF	(Serbia) SRB	Bojan Ilic	22	0	20	0	0	0	2	0
20	FW	(Azerbaijan) AZE	Kanan Karimov	24	4	22	4	0	0	2	0
23	MF	(Turkey) TUR	Hakan Demir	21	0	20	0	0	0	1	0
	GK	(Azerbaijan) AZE	Elchin Jafarov	1	0	1	0	0	0	0	0
	GK	(Azerbaijan) AZE	Osman Umarov	3	0	3	0	0	0	0	0
	DF	(Azerbaijan) AZE	Mehran Əliyev	6	0	6	0	0	0	0	0
	DF	(Azerbaijan) AZE	Afran Ismayilov	7	0	7	0	0	0	0	0
	DF	(Azerbaijan) AZE	Nodar Mammadov	9	0	9	0	0	0	0	0
	DF	(Azerbaijan) AZE	Maksim Medvedev	11	0	11	0	0	0	0	0
	DF	(Azerbaijan) AZE	Rza Qafarlı	2	0	2	0	0	0	0	0
	MF	(Georgia (country)) GEO	Goga Beraia	11	1	11	1	0	0	0	0
	MF	(Azerbaijan) AZE	İsabala İsrafilov	3	0	3	0	0	0	0	0
	MF	(Azerbaijan) AZE	Timur İsrafilov	5	0	5	0	0	0	0	0
	MF	(Azerbaijan) AZE	Tagim Novruzov	10	0	10	0	0	0	0	0
	FW	(Azerbaijan) AZE	Rauf Aliyev	11	1	11	1	0	0	0	0
	FW	(Azerbaijan) AZE	Vagif Javadov	11	4	11	4	0	0	0	0
Players who appeared for Qarabağ that left during the season:
4	DF	(Azerbaijan) AZE	Vasif Hagverdiyev	8	2	7	2	0	0	1	0
6	DF	(Azerbaijan) AZE	Khalig Mardanov	13	1	11	1	0	0	2	0
5	DF	(Azerbaijan) AZE	Sergei Sokolov	7	0	6	0	0	0	1	0
9	FW	(Azerbaijan) AZE	Samir Musayev	12	5	10	3	0	0	2	2
10	FW	(Azerbaijan) AZE	Mushfig Huseynov	10	2	8	2	0	0	2	0
11	MF	(Azerbaijan) AZE	Elmir Khankishiev	11	0	10	0	0	0	1	0
15	MF	(Azerbaijan) AZE	Mubariz Orujov	5	0	5	0	0	0	0	0
18	DF	(Azerbaijan) AZE	Ramiz Huseynov	7	0	5	0	0	0	2	0
	MF	(Serbia) SRB	Slobodan Sladojevic	7	0	7	0	0	0	0	0

=== Goal scorers ===
Place	Position	Nation	Number	Name	Premier League	Azerbaijan Cup	UEFA Cup	Total
1	FW	(Azerbaijan)	20	Kanan Karimov	4	3	0	7
2	FW	(Azerbaijan)	9	Samir Musayev	3	0	2	5
3	FW	(Azerbaijan)		Vagif Javadov	4	0	0	4
4	FW	(Azerbaijan)	10	Mushfig Huseynov	2	0	0	2
4	DF	(Azerbaijan)	4	Vasif Hagverdiyev	2	0	0	2
6	DF	(Azerbaijan)	8	Aslan Kerimov	1	0	0	1
6	FW	(Azerbaijan)		Rauf Aliyev	1	0	0	1
6	MF	(Georgia (country))		Goga Beraia	1	0	0	1
6	MF	(Azerbaijan)	7	Ramal Huseynov	1	0	0	1
6	MF	(Azerbaijan)	6	Khalig Mardanov	1	0	0	1
6	DF	(Azerbaijan)	16	Samir Abbasov	0	1	0	1
				Unknown	0	4	0	4
				TOTALS	20	8	2	30

== Notes ==
- Qarabağ have played their home games at the Tofiq Bahramov Stadium since 1993 due to the ongoing situation in Quzanlı.
