= 2007–08 FK Qarabağ season =

Qarabağ
2007–08 season
- Chairman: Tahir Gözal
- Manager: Rasim Kara
- Stadium: Guzanli Olympic Complex Stadium
- Premier League: 5th
- Azerbaijan Cup: Quarterfinals vs Inter Baku
- Top goalscorer: Vagif Javadov (6)
Home colours	Away colours

The Qarabağ 2007–08 season was Qarabağ's 15th Azerbaijan Premier League season, and their only full season with Rasim Kara as their manager. They finished the season in 5th place, and were knocked out of the Azerbaijan Cup at the Quarterfinal stage by Inter Baku.

== Squad ==
Note: Flags indicate national team as defined under FIFA eligibility rules; some limited exceptions apply. Players may hold more than one non-FIFA nationality.

No.	Pos.	Nation	Player
1	GK	AZE	Farhad Veliyev
2	DF	AZE	Huseyn Isgandarov
3	DF	AZE	Aftandil Hajiyev
4	DF	AZE	Azer Mammadov
5	DF	AZE	Maksim Medvedev
6	DF	GUI	Mamadouba Soumah
7	MF	GEO	Goga Beraia
8	MF	AZE	Aslan Kerimov
10	MF	AZE	Murad Aghakishiyev
11	FW	AZE	Rauf Aliyev
12	GK	AZE	Osman Umarov
13	DF	AZE	Nodar Mammadov

No.	Pos.	Nation	Player
14	MF	NGR	Victor Igbekoyi
15	MF	AZE	Aykhan Abbasov
20	FW	AZE	Vagif Javadov
21	FW	AZE	Kanan Karimov
22	DF	AZE	Timur İsrafilov
23	DF	AZE	Afran Ismayilov
25	DF	LBR	Isaac Pupo
—	DF	AZE	Shahriyar Khalilov
—	DF	AZE	Bayram Karimov
—	DF	AZE	Zaur Hashimov
—	MF	AZE	Elshan Mammadov

== Transfers ==
=== Summer ===
In: Note: Flags indicate national team as defined under FIFA eligibility rules; some limited exceptions apply. Players may hold more than one non-FIFA nationality.

No.	Pos.	Nation	Player
1	GK	AZE	Farhad Veliyev (from (Azerbaijan) Inter Baku)
3	DF	AZE	Aftandil Hajiyev (from (Azerbaijan) Neftchi Baku)
6	DF	GUI	Mamadouba Soumah
9	MF	GEO	Irakli Beraia
10	MF	AZE	Murad Aghakishiyev (from (Azerbaijan) MKT Araz)
14	MF	NGR	Victor Igbekoyi (from (Azerbaijan) Turan Tovuz)
15	MF	AZE	Aykhan Abbasov (from (Azerbaijan) Inter Baku)
25	MF	LBR	Isaac Pupo (from (Liberia) LPRC Oilers)

Out: Note: Flags indicate national team as defined under FIFA eligibility rules; some limited exceptions apply. Players may hold more than one non-FIFA nationality.

No.	Pos.	Nation	Player
7	MF	AZE	Ramal Huseynov (to (Azerbaijan) Baku)
12	GK	AZE	Jahangir Hasanzade (to (Azerbaijan) Inter Baku)
14	MF	AZE	Namiq Yusifov (to (Azerbaijan) Neftchi Baku)
16	DF	AZE	Samir Abbasov (to (Azerbaijan) Inter Baku)
17	DF	SRB	Bojan Ilic (to (Azerbaijan) Baku)

=== Winter ===
In: Note: Flags indicate national team as defined under FIFA eligibility rules; some limited exceptions apply. Players may hold more than one non-FIFA nationality.

No.	Pos.	Nation	Player
—	DF	AZE	Zaur Hashimov (from (Azerbaijan) Khazar Lankaran)
—	MF	AZE	Elshan Mammadov (from (Azerbaijan) Standard Baku)

Out: Note: Flags indicate national team as defined under FIFA eligibility rules; some limited exceptions apply. Players may hold more than one non-FIFA nationality.

No.	Pos.	Nation	Player
9	MF	GEO	Irakli Beraia (to (Azerbaijan) Turan Tovuz)

== Competitions ==
=== Azerbaijan Premier League ===
==== Results ====
11 August 2007 1	Simurq	1 – 0	Qarabağ	Zaqatala
17:00 AZST (UTC+5)	Mazyar 51'	Summary

18 August 2007 2	Qarabağ	0 – 1	Karvan	Baku
17:00 AZST (UTC+5)		Summary	Akhalkatsi 55'	Stadium: Tofiq Bahramov Stadium^{1}

26 August 2007 3	Khazar Lankaran	2 – 0	Qarabağ	Lankaran
19:00 AZST (UTC+5)	Bakhshiev 35'; Juninho 61'	Summary		Stadium: Lankaran City Stadium

1 September 2007 4	Masallı	1 – 0	Qarabağ	Masallı
19:00 AZST (UTC+5)	Fabio Ricardo 46'	Summary		Stadium: Anatoliy Banishevskiy Stadium

16 September 2007 5	Qarabağ	3 – 1	ABN Bärdä	Baku
18:00 AZST (UTC+5)	Javadov 50', 72'; Igbekoyi 58'	Summary	K.Muradov 59'	Stadium: Tofiq Bahramov Stadium^{1}

22 September 2007 6	Turan Tovuz	0 – 2	Qarabağ	Tovuz
17:00 AZST (UTC+5)		Summary	Igbekoyi	Stadium: Tovuz City Stadium

30 September 2007 7	Qarabağ	3 – 1	Gänclärbirliyi Sumqayit	Baku
18:00 AZST (UTC+5)	Javadov 58'; Igbekoyi 62'; Abbasov 88'	Summary	Stanić 5' (pen.)	Stadium: Tofiq Bahramov Stadium^{1}

6 October 2007 8	Gabala	1 – 2	Qarabağ	Qabala
15:00 AZST (UTC+5)	Ngoy 62'	Summary	K.Kerimov 14'; Beraia 48'	Stadium: Gabala City Stadium

28 October 2007 9	Inter Baku	1 – 0	Qarabağ	baku
20:25 AZST (UTC+5)	K.Mammadov 87'	Summary		Stadium: Shafa Stadium

4 November 2007 10	Standard Baku	0 – 1	Qarabağ	Sumqayit
15:00 AZT (UTC+4)		Summary	Javadov 41'	Stadium: Mehdi Huseynzade Stadium

10 November 2007 11	Qarabağ	1 – 1	Baku	Baku
15:00 AZT (UTC+4)	Hajiyev 90'	Summary	Tijani 7'	Stadium: Tofiq Bahramov Stadium^{1}

25 November 2007 12	Neftchi Baku	0 – 0	Qarabağ	Baku
15:00 AZT (UTC+4)		Summary		Stadium: Tofik Bakhramov Stadium

1 December 2007 13	Qarabağ	0 – 1	Olimpik Baku	Baku
14:15 AZT (UTC+4)		Summary	Junivan 25'	Stadium: Tofiq Bahramov Stadium^{1}

16 February 2008 14	Qarabağ	2 – 2	Simurq	Baku
15:00 AZT (UTC+4)	Javadov 68'; Pupo 83'	Summary	Nasibov 24'; Sayadov 30'	Stadium: Tofiq Bahramov Stadium^{1}

24 February 2008 15	Karvan	0 – 0	Qarabağ	Yevlakh
15:00 AZT (UTC+4)		Summary		Stadium: Yevlakh City Stadium

2 March 2008 16	Qarabağ	2 – 0	Khazar Lankaran	Baku
15:00 AZT (UTC+4)	Javadov 4'; Hashimov 13'	Summary		Stadium: Tofig Bakhramov Stadium^{1}

15 March 2008 17	Qarabağ	1 – 1	Masallı	Baku
15:00 AZT (UTC+4)	R.Aliyev 34'	Summary	R.Amiraslanov 76'	Stadium: Tofig Bakhramov Stadium^{1}

30 March 2008 18	Qarabağ	0 – 0	Turan Tovuz	Baku
16:00 AZT (UTC+4)		Summary		Stadium: Tofig Bakhramov Stadium^{1}

6 April 2008 19	Gänclärbirliyi Sumqayit	0 – 1	Qarabağ	Sumqayit
16:00 AZST (UTC+5)		Summary	Mammadov 90'	Stadium: Mehdi Huseynzade Stadium

13 April 2008 20	Qarabağ	2 – 1	Gabala	Baku
16:00 AZST (UTC+5)	K.Kerimov 8'; A.Kerimov 55'	Summary	Tebloyev 80'	Stadium: Tofig Bakhramov Stadium^{1}

19 April 2008 21	Inter Baku	1 – 0	Qarabağ	Baku
16:00 AZST (UTC+5)	Qurbanov 10'	Summary		Stadium: Shafa Stadium

26 April 2008 22	ABN Bärdä	0 – 3	Qarabağ	Barda
16:00 AZST (UTC+5)		Summary	Aghakishiyev 8'; Igbekoyi 15'; A.Kerimov 22'	Stadium: Barda City Stadium

4 May 2008 23	Qarabağ	1 – 0	Standard Baku	Baku
17:00 AZST (UTC+5)	Abbasov 51'	Summary		Stadium: Tofiq Bahramov Stadium^{1}

12 May 2008 24	Baku	0 – 0	Qarabağ	Baku
18:00 AZST (UTC+5)		Summary		Stadium: Tofig Bakhramov Stadium

17 May 2008 25	Qarabağ	0 – 0	Neftchi Baku	Baku
17:00 AZST (UTC+5)		Summary		Stadium: Tofiq Bahramov Stadium^{1}

27 May 2008 26	Olimpik Baku	0 – 1	Qarabağ	Baku
16:00 AZST (UTC+5)		Summary	Hashimov 80'	Stadium: Shafa Stadium

==== Table ====
Pos	Team	Pld	W	D	L	GF	GA	GD	Pts	Qualification or relegation
3	Neftçi Baku	26	16	7	3	42	18	+24	55	Qualification for Intertoto Cup first round
4	Khazar Lankaran	26	14	10	2	44	16	+28	52	Qualification for UEFA Cup first qualifying round (Note: Khazar Lankaran qualified for the first qualifiying round of the 1st qualifying round of the UEFA Cup as winners of the 2007–08 Azerbaijan Cup.)
5	Qarabağ	26	11	8	7	25	16	+9	41	
6	Gabala	26	11	3	12	33	36	−3	36	
7	Simurq	26	9	9	8	31	25	+6	36	

Source: Azerbaijan Professional Football league
Rules for classification: 1) points; 2) goal difference; 3) number of goals scored.

=== Azerbaijan Cup ===
26 September 2007 1st Round 1st Leg	MKT Araz	0 – 1	Qarabağ	Imishli
		[ Summary]		Stadium: Heydar Aliyev Stadium

3 October 2007 1st Round 2nd Leg	Qarabağ	4 – 0 (5 – 0 agg.)	MKT Araz	Baku
		[ Summary]		Stadium: Tofig Bakhramov Stadium^{1}

24 October 2007 Round of 16 1st Leg	Turan Tovuz	0 – 2	Qarabağ	Tovuz
		Summary	Igbekoyi 7'; Karimov 85'	Stadium: Tovuz City Stadium

31 October 2007 Round of 16 2nd Leg	Qarabağ	2 – 1 (4 – 1 agg.)	Turan Tovuz	Baku
	Aghakishiyev 41'; Javadov 90+1'	Summary	Garaev 88'	Stadium: Tofig Bakhramov Stadium^{1}

3 March 2008 Quarterfinals 1st Leg	Inter Baku	2 – 2	Qarabağ	Baku
15:00 AZT (UTC+4)	Cuello 45', 73'	[ Summary]	Aliyev 63', 87'	Stadium: Zabrat Stadium

19 March 2008 Quarterfinals 2nd Leg	Qarabağ	0 – 1 (2 – 3 agg.)	Inter Baku	Baku
17:00 AZT (UTC+4)		Summary	Goal	Stadium: Tofig Bakhramov Stadium^{1}

== Squad statistics ==
=== Appearances and goals ===
No.	Pos	Nat	Player	Total		Premier League		Azerbaijan Cup	
No.	Pos	Nat	Player	Apps	Goals	Apps	Goals	Apps	Goals
1	GK	(Azerbaijan) AZE	Farhad Veliyev	24	0	24	0	0	0
2	DF	(Azerbaijan) AZE	Huseyn Isgandarov	16	0	16	0	0	0
3	DF	(Azerbaijan) AZE	Aftandil Hajiyev	18	1	18	1	0	0
4	DF	(Azerbaijan) AZE	Azer Mammadov	18	0	18	0	0	0
5	DF	(Azerbaijan) AZE	Maksim Medvedev	18	0	18	0	0	0
6	DF	(Guinea) GUI	Mamadouba Soumah	25	0	25	0	0	0
7	MF	(Georgia (country)) GEO	Goga Beraia	16	1	16	1	0	0
8	DF	(Azerbaijan) AZE	Aslan Kerimov	20	2	20	2	0	0
10	MF	(Azerbaijan) AZE	Murad Aghakishiyev	23	1	23	1	0	0
11	FW	(Azerbaijan) AZE	Rauf Aliyev	7	1	7	1	0	0
12	GK	(Azerbaijan) AZE	Osman Umarov	2	0	2	0	0	0
13	DF	(Azerbaijan) AZE	Nodar Mammadov	18	0	18	0	0	0
14	MF	(Nigeria) NGR	Victor Igbekoyi	22	5	22	5	0	0
15	MF	(Azerbaijan) AZE	Aykhan Abbasov	21	2	21	2	0	0
20	FW	(Azerbaijan) AZE	Vagif Javadov	25	6	25	6	0	0
21	FW	(Azerbaijan) AZE	Kanan Karimov	20	2	20	2	0	0
22	DF	(Azerbaijan) AZE	Timur İsrafilov	4	0	4	0	0	0
23	MF	(Azerbaijan) AZE	Afran Ismayilov	6	0	6	0	0	0
25	MF	(Liberia) LBR	Isaac Pupo	23	1	23	1	0	0
	DF	(Azerbaijan) AZE	Shahriyar Khalilov	4	0	4	0	0	0
	DF	(Azerbaijan) AZE	Bayram Karimov	1	0	1	0	0	0
	DF	(Azerbaijan) AZE	Zaur Hashimov	12	2	12	2	0	0
	MF	(Azerbaijan) AZE	Elshan Mammadov	8	1	8	1	0	0
Players away from Qarabağ on loan:
16	MF	(Azerbaijan) AZE	Tagim Novruzov	4	0	4	0	0	0
Players who appeared for Qarabağ that left during the season:
9	MF	(Georgia (country)) GEO	Irakli Beraia	4	0	4	0	0	0

=== Goal scorers ===
Place	Position	Nation	Number	Name	Premier League	Azerbaijan Cup	Total
1	FW	(Azerbaijan)	20	Vagif Javadov	6	1	7
2	MF	(Nigeria)	14	Victor Igbekoyi	5	1	6
3	FW	(Azerbaijan)	11	Rauf Aliyev	1	2	3
3	FW	(Azerbaijan)	21	Kanan Karimov	2	1	3
5	MF	(Azerbaijan)	15	Aykhan Abbasov	2	0	2
5	DF	(Azerbaijan)	8	Aslan Kerimov	2	0	2
5	DF	(Azerbaijan)		Zaur Hashimov	2	0	2
5	MF	(Azerbaijan)	10	Murad Aghakishiyev	1	1	2
9	MF	(Liberia)	25	Isaac Pupo	1	0	1
9	FW	(Azerbaijan)		Elshan Mammadov	1	0	1
9	DF	(Azerbaijan)	3	Aftandil Hajiyev	1	0	1
9	MF	(Georgia (country))	7	Goga Beraia	1	0	1
				Unknown	0	5	5
				TOTALS	25	11	36

== Notes ==
- Qarabağ have played their home games at the Tofiq Bahramov Stadium since 1993 due to the ongoing situation in Quzanlı.
