= Kamran Agayev =

Azerbaijani footballer (born 1986)

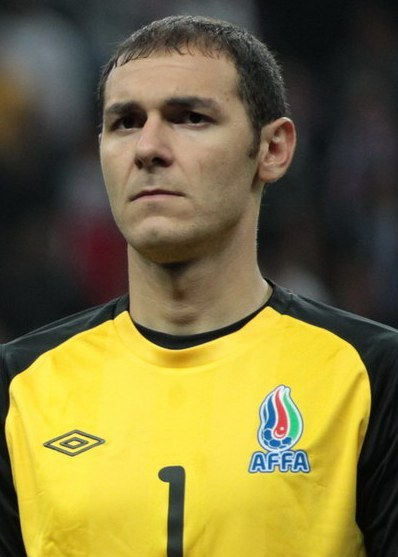

Personal information
- Full name: Kamran Ədilxan oğlu Ağayev
- Date of birth: 9 February 1986 (age 40)
- Place of birth: Shabran, Soviet Union
- Height: 1.89 m (6 ft 2 in)
- Position: Goalkeeper

Senior career*
Years	Team	Apps	(Gls)
2001–2004	Shafa Baku	26	(0)
2004–2006	Turan Tovuz	18	(0)
2006–2013	Khazar Lankaran	122	(0)
2013	Baku	17	(0)
2014–2015	Gabala	33	(0)
2015	Kayserispor	6	(0)
2015	Karşıyaka	13	(0)
2016	Inter Baku	9	(0)
2016–2017	Boavista	12	(0)
2017	Mladá Boleslav	5	(0)
2018–2019	Keşla	28	(0)
2020–2022	Sabail	10	(0)
Total		299	(0)

International career
2001–2004	Azerbaijan U17	20	(0)
2008–2018	Azerbaijan	79	(0)
- * Club domestic league appearances and goals

Kamran Agayev (also spelled Kamran Aghayev; Azerbaijani: Kamran Ağayev; born 9 February 1986) is a retired Azerbaijani football goalkeeper.

During his professional career, Agayev played in national leagues of Azerbaijan, Turkey, Portugal and Czech Republic. He was also a member of Azerbaijan national football team and is the third most-capped player in the history of the team with 79 games. Widely recognized as one of the best goalkeepers in the history of Azerbaijan, he was selected as the Azerbaijani Footballer of the Year in 2008 and goalkeeper of the year in 2009, 2011 and 2012. He announced his retirement from football in January 2022.

== Club career ==
=== Early career ===
Agayev began playing football during his school years under his father for local club named Bərəkət. At the young age of just 15, he debuted for Azerbaijani U-17, after he was spotted by one of national coaches. After his impressive performances for youth team, he joined Shafa Baku and won his first big trophy under Vagif Sadygov in 2001.

=== Professional career ===
In 2004, he was signed by PFC Turan Tovuz, serving two years in the club, then purchased by Khazar Lankaran. During the 2006–07 season, his performances proved to be instrumental, where club won Azerbaijan Premier League and Azerbaijan Cup. In his first season in the Azerbaijan Premier League, Agayev confirmed his performances, firmly ensuring a place in the starting lineup, his performances being praised by many football pundits. During 6 seasons spent at Khazar Lankaran, Agayev became national champion, two time national league runner-up, three time Azerbaijani Cup winner and CIS Cup champion. He was also the captain of Khazar Lankaran.

On 31 January 2014, Agayev signed an 18-month contract with Gabala FC. A year later, on 1 February 2015, Agayev was released by Gabala. He later played for Kayserispor and Karşıyaka in Turkey and Inter Baku in Azerbaijani championship.

On 12 September 2016, Agayev signed with Primeira Liga side Boavista, until June 2017, making his debut on against Porto on 25 September 2016. His early days at the club were marked by some inconsistency, with both good and bad performances. He took some unfortunate goals, but did manage to pull off a few impressive exhibitions, securing important results for the team. He also quickly bonded with the Boavista fans, often staying in the pitch after the end of the match and taking time to thank the fans for their support.

On 28 July 2017 Agayev signed a one-year contract with Czech First League side Mladá Boleslav. He made his Czech First League debut for Mladá Boleslav against Slavia Prague in Eden Arena on 27 August 2017.

On 17 January 2018, Keşla FK announced the signing of Agayev on a six-month contract.

On 25 August 2020, Agayev signed for Sabail FK on a contract until the end of the 2020–21 season.

On 11 January 2022, Agayev announced his retirement from football.

=== International career ===
Agayev has saved ten of the thirteen penalties he faced in matches for Azerbaijan, furthering his reputation as an excellent penalty stopper.

== Career statistics ==
=== Club ===
As of match played 4 December 2021

Appearances and goals by club, season and competition
Club	Season	League			National Cup		League Cup		Continental		Total	
Club	Season	Division	Apps	Goals	Apps	Goals	Apps	Goals	Apps	Goals	Apps	Goals
Shafa Baku	2003–04	Azerbaijan Premier League	8	0			—				8	0
Turan-Tovuz	2004–05	Azerbaijan Premier League	6	0			—				6	0
Turan-Tovuz	2005–06	Azerbaijan Premier League	12	0			—				12	0
Turan-Tovuz	Total		44	0			-	-	-	-	44	0
Khazar Lankaran	2006–07	Azerbaijan Premier League	14	0			—				14	0
Khazar Lankaran	2007–08	Azerbaijan Premier League	17	0			—		2	0	19	0
Khazar Lankaran	2008–09	Azerbaijan Premier League	7	0			—		0	0	7	0
Khazar Lankaran	2009–10	Azerbaijan Premier League	30	0	4	0	—				34	0
Khazar Lankaran	2010–11	Azerbaijan Premier League	28	0	5	0	—		2	0	35	0
Khazar Lankaran	2011–12	Azerbaijan Premier League	26	0	2	0	—		2	0	30	0
Khazar Lankaran	2012–13	Azerbaijan Premier League	0	0	0	0	—		4	0	4	0
Khazar Lankaran	Total		122	0	11	0	-	-	10	0	143	0
Baku	2012–13	Azerbaijan Premier League	7	0	1	0	—				8	0
Baku	2013–14	Azerbaijan Premier League	10	0	0	0	—				10	0
Baku	Total		17	0	1	0	-	-	-	-	18	0
Gabala	2013–14	Azerbaijan Premier League	16	0	4	0	—				20	0
Gabala	2014–15	Azerbaijan Premier League	17	0	0	0	—		2	0	19	0
Gabala	Total		33	0	4	0	-	-	2	0	39	0
Kayserispor	2014–15	TFF First League	6	0	1	0	—				7	0
Karşıyaka	2015–16	TFF First League	13	0	0	0	—				13	0
Inter Baku	2015–16	Azerbaijan Premier League	9	0	3	0	—		0	0	12	0
Boavista	2016–17	Primeira Liga	12	0	2	0	0	0	—		14	0
Mladá Boleslav	2017–18	Czech First League	5	0	2	0	0	0	—		7	0
Keşla	2017–18	Azerbaijan Premier League	9	0	2	0	—				11	0
Keşla	2018–19	Azerbaijan Premier League	19	0	2	0	—		2	0	23	0
Keşla	Total		28	0	4	0	-	-	2	0	34	0
Sabail	2020–21	Azerbaijan Premier League	1	0	2	0	—				3	0
Sabail	2021–22	Azerbaijan Premier League	9	0	0	0	—		—		9	0
Sabail	Total		10	0	2	0	-	-	0	0	12	0
Career total			298	0	30	0	0	0	14	0	343	0

=== International ===
Azerbaijan national team
Year	Apps	Goals
2008	4	0
2009	7	0
2010	9	0
2011	9	0
2012	7	0
2013	8	0
2014	6	0
2015	7	0
2016	4	0
2017	8	0
2018	10	0
Total	79	0

Statistics accurate as of match played 17 November 2018

== Honours ==
=== Club ===
Khazar Lankaran

- Azerbaijan Premier League
  - Winner (1): 2006–07
- Azerbaijan Cup
  - Winner (3): 2006–07, 2007–08, 2010–11
- CIS Cup
  - Winner (1): 2008

Kayserispor

- TFF First League
  - Winner (1): 2014–15

Keşla

- Azerbaijan Cup
  - Winner (1): 2017–18

=== Individual ===
- Azerbaijani Footballer of the Year (1): 2008.
- Azerbaijani Goalkeeper of the Year (3): 2009, 2011, 2012,
