= Adehim Niftaliyev =

Azerbaijani footballer (born 1976)

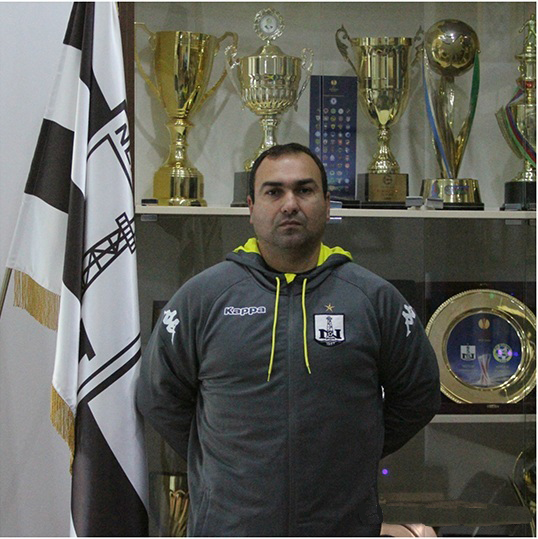

Personal information
- Full name: Ədəhim Niftəliyev
- Date of birth: 7 September 1976 (age 50)
- Height: 1.73 m (5 ft 8 in)
- Position: Defender

Senior career*
Years	Team	Apps	(Gls)
1994–1996	Kur	40	(0)
1996	Neftchi Baku	12	(0)
1997–1998	MOIK Baku	61	(0)
1999–2002	Neftchi Baku	56	(1)
2003	Qarabağ	13	(0)
2004	Mes Kerman		
2004–2007	Khazar Lankaran	60	(0)
2007	Masallı	3	(0)
2008	Gänclärbirliyi Sumqayit	12	(0)
2008–2012	Bakılı Baku		
2012–2013	Qala	17	(0)

International career
1999–2003	Azerbaijan	19	(0)
- * Club domestic league appearances and goals

Adehim Niftaliyev (Azerbaijani: Ədahim Niftəliyev; born 7 September 1976) is a retired Azerbaijani football player who represented the Azerbaijani national team and played his entire career, apart from a short spell in Iran with Mes Kerman, in Azerbaijan.

== Career statistics ==
Club performance			League		Cup		Continental		Total	
Season	Club	League	Apps	Goals	Apps	Goals	Apps	Goals	Apps	Goals
1994–95	Kur	Azerbaijan Top League	18	0			-		18	0
1995–96	Kur	Azerbaijan Top League	22	0			-		22	0
1996–97	Neftchi Baku	Azerbaijan Top League	12	0					12	0
1996–97	MOIK Baku	Azerbaijan Top League	14	0			-		14	0
1997–98	MOIK Baku	Azerbaijan Top League	24	0			-		24	0
1998–99	MOIK Baku	Azerbaijan Top League	23	0			-		23	0
1998–99	Neftchi Baku	Azerbaijan Top League	5	1			-		5	1
1999–2000	Neftchi Baku	Azerbaijan Top League	21	0					21	0
2000–01	Neftchi Baku	Azerbaijan Top League	19	0					19	0
2001–02	Neftchi Baku	Azerbaijan Top League	11	0			2	0	13	0
2002–03	no league championship was held		-		-		-		0	0
2003–04	Qarabağ	Azerbaijan Top League	13	0			-		13	0
2003–04	Mes Kerman	Azadegan League					-			
2004–05	Khazar Lankaran	Azerbaijan Top League	28	0	6	0	-		34	0
2005–06	Khazar Lankaran	Azerbaijan Top League	15	0	6	0	1	0	22	0
2006–07	Khazar Lankaran	Azerbaijan Top League	17	0	9	0	-		26	0
2007–08	Masallı	Azerbaijan Premier League	3	0			-		3	0
2007–08	Gänclärbirliyi Sumqayit	Azerbaijan Premier League	12	0			-		12	0
2008–09	Bakılı Baku	Azerbaijan Premier League	20	0			-		20	0
2009–10	Bakılı Baku	Azerbaijan First Division					-			
2010–11	Bakılı Baku	Azerbaijan First Division					-			
2011–12	Bakılı Baku	Azerbaijan First Division	7	0			-		7	0
2012–13	Qala	Azerbaijan First Division	17	0			-		17	0
Total	Azerbaijan		301	1			3	0	304	1
Total	Iran						-			
Career total			301	1			3	0	304	1

== National team statistics ==
Azerbaijan national team
Year	Apps	Goals
1999	4	0
2000	2	0
2001	7	0
2002	3	0
2003	3	0
Total	19	0
