= Fattakhov =

Fattakhov (Tatar: Фәттахов, Russian: Фаттахов) is a Tatar masculine surname, its feminine counterpart is Fattakhova. It may refer to

- Dmitri Fattakhov (born 1996), Russian football player
- Ilgiz Fattakhov (born 1986), Russian football player
- Vasilya Fattakhova (1979–2016), Tatar singer
