= 2008 Commonwealth of Independent States Cup =

CIS Cup, Кубок Содружества 2008

Tournament details
- Host country: Russia
- Dates: 19–27 January 2008
- Teams: 16
- Venues: 2 (in 1 host city)

Final positions
- Champions: (Azerbaijan) Khazar Lankaran (1st title)

Tournament statistics
- Matches played: 31
- Goals scored: 95 (3.06 per match)
- Top scorer(s): (Belarus) Vladimir Yurchenko (4 goals)

The 2008 Commonwealth of Independent States Cup was the sixteenth edition of the competition between the champions of former republics of Soviet Union. It was won by Khazar Lankaran for the first time. This was the first edition of the tournament to be hosted in Saint Petersburg, rather than in Moscow.

== Participants ==
Team	Qualification	Participation
(Russia) Zenit Saint Petersburg	2007 Russian Premier League champions ^{1}	1st
(Ukraine) Dynamo Kyiv	2006–07 Vyshcha Liha champions ^{1}	10th
(Belarus) BATE Borisov	2007 Belarusian Premier League champions	4th
(Lithuania) FBK Kaunas	2007 A Lyga champions	10th
(Latvia) Ventspils	2007 Latvian Higher League champions	2nd
(Estonia) Levadia Tallinn	2007 Meistriliiga champions	5th
(Moldova) Sheriff Tiraspol	2006–07 Moldovan National Division champions	7th
(Georgia (country)) Olimpi Rustavi	2006–07 Umaglesi Liga champions	1st
(Armenia) Banants Yerevan	2007 Armenian Premier League runners-up ^{2}	2nd
(Azerbaijan) Khazar Lankaran	2006–07 Azerbaijan Top League champions	1st
(Kazakhstan) Aktobe	2007 Kazakhstan Premier League champions	3rd
(Uzbekistan) Pakhtakor Tashkent	2007 Uzbek League champions	7th
(Tajikistan) Regar-TadAZ Tursunzoda	2007 Tajik League champions	7th
(Turkmenistan) Aşgabat	2007 Ýokary Liga champions	1st
(Kyrgyzstan) Dordoi-Dynamo Naryn	2007 Kyrgyzstan League champions	4th
(Serbia) OFK Beograd	2006–07 Serbian SuperLiga 7th team ^{3}	2nd

- ^{1} Zenit Saint Petersburg and Dynamo Kyiv were represented by reserve players.
- ^{2} Banants Yerevan replaced Pyunik Yerevan (2007 Armenian champions), who were not allowed to participate after 2006 semifinal incident.
- ^{3} OFK Beograd invited by the organizing committee instead of Russian U21/U19 teams.

== Group stage ==
=== Group A ===
Team	Pld	W	D	L	GF	GA	GD	Pts
(Russia) Zenit Saint Petersburg	3	2	0	1	6	4	+2	6
(Moldova) Sheriff Tiraspol	3	2	0	1	8	3	+5	6
(Estonia) Levadia Tallinn	3	1	0	2	2	5	−3	3
(Turkmenistan) Aşgabat	3	1	0	2	2	6	−4	3

Source: RSSSF

==== Results ====
19 January 2008
19:00

Zenit Saint Petersburg (Russia)	3 – 1	(Moldova) Sheriff Tiraspol
Yurchenko 39'; Gorbunov 45'; Denis Minkov 88'		Picușceac 18'

SKK Peterburgsky, Saint Petersburg
Attendance: 4,500
Referee: Oleh Oriekhov (Ukraine)
19 January 2008
19:00

Levadia Tallinn (Estonia)	1 – 0	(Turkmenistan) Aşgabat
Andreyev 73'

Zenit Palace of Sports, Saint Petersburg
Attendance: 100
Referee: Ravshan Ishmatov (Tajikistan)

20 January 2008
19:00

Aşgabat (Turkmenistan)	2 – 1	(Russia) Zenit Saint Petersburg
Durdyýew 77'; Öwekow 78'		Yurchenko 5'

SKK Peterburgsky, Saint Petersburg
Attendance: 3,000
Referee: Andrejs Sipailo (Latvia)
20 January 2008
19:00

Sheriff Tiraspol (Moldova)	3 – 0	(Estonia) Levadia Tallinn
Gnanou 3', 50'; Wallace 10'

Zenit Palace of Sports, Saint Petersburg
Attendance: 500
Referee: Karen Nalbandyan (Armenia)

22 January 2008
19:00

Zenit Saint Petersburg (Russia)	2 – 1	(Estonia) Levadia Tallinn
Ignatovich 17'; Yurchenko 20'		Nahk 66' (pen.)

SKK Peterburgsky, Saint Petersburg
Attendance: 3,000
Referee: Karen Nalbandyan (Armenia)
22 January 2008
19:00

Aşgabat (Turkmenistan)	0 – 4	(Moldova) Sheriff Tiraspol
		Balima 6'; Wallace 44'; Tiago 70'; Alexeev 73'

Zenit Palace of Sports, Saint Petersburg
Attendance: 500
Referee: Audrius Žuta (Lithuania)

=== Group B ===
Team	Pld	W	D	L	GF	GA	GD	Pts
(Azerbaijan) Khazar Lankaran	3	2	0	1	5	2	+3	6
(Lithuania) FBK Kaunas	3	2	0	1	9	6	+3	6
(Kazakhstan) Aktobe	3	2	0	1	8	4	+4	6
(Tajikistan) Regar-TadAZ Tursunzoda	3	0	0	3	2	12	−10	0

Source: RSSSF

==== Results ====
19 January 2008
15:00

Khazar Lankaran (Azerbaijan)	3 – 0	(Lithuania) FBK Kaunas
Poladov 47'; Ramazanov 50'; Diego Gusmão 66'

SKK Peterburgsky, Saint Petersburg
Attendance: 1,000
Referee: Lasha Silagava (Georgia)
19 January 2008
15:00

Aktobe (Kazakhstan)	5 – 0	(Tajikistan) Regar-TadAZ Tursunzoda
Badlo 5'; Khairullin 31', 34'; Strukov 69'; Bogomolov 85'

Zenit Palace of Sports, Saint Petersburg
Attendance: 100
Referee: Sergey Shmolik (Belarus)

20 January 2008
15:00

FBK Kaunas (Lithuania)	4 – 2	(Kazakhstan) Aktobe
Ledesma 15'; G.Kvaratskhelia 21'; Laurišas 29'; Kosolapov 31' (o.g.)		Valkanov 65' (o.g.); Ashirbekov 84' (pen.)

SKK Peterburgsky, Saint Petersburg
Attendance: 1,000
Referee: Nikolai Ivanov (Russia)
20 January 2008
15:00

Regar-TadAZ Tursunzoda (Tajikistan)	1 – 2	(Azerbaijan) Khazar Lankaran
Ortikov 4'		Nabiyev 55', 65'

Zenit Palace of Sports, Saint Petersburg
Attendance: 1,000
Referee: Emil Busurmankulov (Kyrgyzstan)

22 January 2008
15:00

Aktobe (Kazakhstan)	1 – 0	(Azerbaijan) Khazar Lankaran
Ashirbekov 90' (pen.)

SKK Peterburgsky, Saint Petersburg
Attendance: 1,000
Referee: Aleksandr Gvardis (Russia)
22 January 2008
15:00

FBK Kaunas (Lithuania)	5 – 1	(Tajikistan) Regar-TadAZ Tursunzoda
Pehlić 28'; Fattakhov 36'; Ledesma 66'; Barevičius 73'; Vičius 79'		Rabimov 53' (pen.)

Zenit Palace of Sports, Saint Petersburg
Attendance: 150
Referee: Igor Șațchii (Moldova)

=== Group C ===
Team	Pld	W	D	L	GF	GA	GD	Pts
(Georgia (country)) Olimpi Rustavi	3	3	0	0	8	2	+6	9
(Latvia) Ventspils	3	2	0	1	3	3	0	6
(Serbia) OFK Beograd	3	1	0	2	2	4	−2	3
(Kyrgyzstan) Dordoi-Dynamo Naryn	3	0	0	3	2	6	−4	0

Source: RSSSF

==== Results ====
19 January 2008
13:00

OFK Beograd (Serbia)	0 – 2	(Georgia (country)) Olimpi Rustavi
		Omelyanov 74', 75'

SKK Peterburgsky, Saint Petersburg
Attendance: 300
Referee: Igor Șațchii (Moldova)
19 January 2008
13:00

Ventspils (Latvia)	1 – 0	(Kyrgyzstan) Dordoi-Dynamo Naryn
Țîgîrlaș 55'

Zenit Palace of Sports, Saint Petersburg
Attendance: 100
Referee: Allabergen Sapaev (Turkmenistan)

20 January 2008
13:00

Ventspils (Latvia)	2 – 0	(Serbia) OFK Beograd
Rimkus 72' (pen.), 90' (pen.)

SKK Peterburgsky, Saint Petersburg
Attendance: 300
Referee: Babak Guliyev (Azerbaijan)
20 January 2008
13:00

Dordoi-Dynamo Naryn (Kyrgyzstan)	2 – 3	(Georgia (country)) Olimpi Rustavi
Kum 46'; Kudrenko 52' (pen.)		Kovalevskyi 27', 45'; V.Kvaratskhelia 80'

Zenit Palace of Sports, Saint Petersburg
Attendance: 300
Referee: Vladislav Tseytlin (Uzbekistan)

22 January 2008
13:00

Olimpi Rustavi (Georgia (country))	3 – 0	(Latvia) Ventspils
Khubua 24'; Deliminkov 32' (o.g.); Patula 76'

SKK Peterburgsky, Saint Petersburg
Attendance: 300
Referee: Sergey Gorokhovodatskiy (Kazakhstan)
22 January 2008
13:00

OFK Beograd (Serbia)	2 – 0	(Kyrgyzstan) Dordoi-Dynamo Naryn
Milovac 28'; Šćepović 90'

Zenit Palace of Sports, Saint Petersburg
Attendance: 200
Referee: Lasha Silagava (Georgia)

=== Group D ===
Team	Pld	W	D	L	GF	GA	GD	Pts
(Uzbekistan) Pakhtakor Tashkent	3	2	0	1	5	2	+3	6
(Belarus) BATE Borisov	3	1	2	0	4	3	+1	5
(Ukraine) Dynamo Kyiv	3	1	1	1	2	2	0	4
(Armenia) Banants Yerevan	3	0	1	2	1	5	−4	1

Source: RSSSF

==== Results ====
19 January 2008
17:00

Pakhtakor Tashkent (Uzbekistan)	1 – 0	(Ukraine) Dynamo Kyiv
Z.Tadjiyev 11'

SKK Peterburgsky, Saint Petersburg
Attendance: 2,000
Referee: Aleksandr Gvardis (Russia)
19 January 2008
17:00

Banants Yerevan (Armenia)	1 – 1	(Belarus) BATE Borisov
Melkonyan 30'		Sivakow 88'

Zenit Palace of Sports, Saint Petersburg
Attendance: 100
Referee: Sergey Gorokhovodatskiy (Kazakhstan)

20 January 2008
17:00

Dynamo Kyiv (Ukraine)	1 – 1	(Belarus) BATE Borisov
Morozyuk 62' (pen.)		Krivets 50'

SKK Peterburgsky, Saint Petersburg
Attendance: 600
Referee: Hannes Kaasik (Estonia)
20 January 2008
17:00

Pakhtakor Tashkent (Uzbekistan)	3 – 0	(Armenia) Banants Yerevan
Suyunov 11'; Soliev 22'; Z.Tadjiyev 76'

Zenit Palace of Sports, Saint Petersburg
Attendance: 1,000
Referee: Audrius Žuta (Lithuania)

22 January 2008
17:00

BATE Borisov (Belarus)	2 – 1	(Uzbekistan) Pakhtakor Tashkent
Rodionov 24'; Skavysh 78'		F.Tadjiyev 48'

SKK Peterburgsky, Saint Petersburg
Attendance: 1,000
Referee: Nikolai Ivanov (Russia)
22 January 2008
17:00

Dynamo Kyiv (Ukraine)	1 – 0	(Armenia) Banants Yerevan
Morozyuk 65' (pen.)

Zenit Palace of Sports, Saint Petersburg
Attendance: 300
Referee: Andrejs Sipailo (Latvia)

== Final rounds ==
Quarterfinals (23 Jan)
(Azerbaijan)	Khazar Lankaran (p)	2
(Moldova)	Sheriff Tiraspol	2
(Georgia (country))	Olimpi Rustavi	1
(Belarus)	BATE Borisov	2
(Russia)	Zenit Saint Petersburg	1
(Lithuania)	FBK Kaunas	2
(Uzbekistan)	Pakhtakor Tashkent (p)	0
(Latvia)	Ventspils	0

Semifinals (25 Jan)
(Azerbaijan)	Khazar Lankaran	2
(Belarus)	BATE Borisov	1
(Lithuania)	FBK Kaunas	1
(Uzbekistan)	Pakhtakor Tashkent	3

Final (27 Jan)
(Azerbaijan)	Khazar Lankaran	4
(Uzbekistan)	Pakhtakor Tashkent	3

=== Quarterfinals ===
23 January 2008
13:00

Olimpi Rustavi (Georgia (country))	1 – 2	(Belarus) BATE Borisov
Khubua 72'		Bliznyuk 43'; Rodionov 85'

SKK Peterburgsky, Saint Petersburg
Attendance: 500
Referee: Vladislav Tseytlin (Uzbekistan)
23 January 2008
15:00

Pakhtakor Tashkent (Uzbekistan)	1 – 1	(Latvia) Ventspils
Inomov 80'		Rimkus 41'
Penalties
Soliev (penalty scored); Inomov (penalty scored); Kholmatov (penalty scored); F.Tadjiyev (penalty scored); Aliqulov (penalty scored); Maqsudov (penalty scored); Z.Tadjiyev (penalty scored)	7 – 6	(penalty scored) Rimkus; (penalty scored) Dubensky; (penalty scored) Ziziļevs; (penalty scored) Kačanovs; (penalty scored) Țîgîrlaș; (penalty scored) Soleičuks; (penalty missed) Aleksandr Mysikov

SKK Peterburgsky, Saint Petersburg
Attendance: 800
Referee: Igor Șațchii (Moldova)
23 January 2008
17:00

Khazar Lankaran (Azerbaijan)	2 – 2	(Moldova) Sheriff Tiraspol
Mário Souza 53', 90'		Gnanou 35'; Balima 64'
Penalties
Quliyev (penalty scored); Diego Gusmão (penalty scored); Ramazanov (penalty scored); Sultanov (penalty scored); Mário Souza (penalty scored)	5 – 3	(penalty missed) Tarkhnishvili; (penalty scored) Chinwo; (penalty scored) Wallace; (penalty scored) Gnanou

SKK Peterburgsky, Saint Petersburg
Attendance: 2,000
Referee: Oleh Oriekhov (Ukraine)
23 January 2008
19:00

Zenit Saint Petersburg (Russia)	1 – 2	(Lithuania) FBK Kaunas
Yurchenko 43'		Ledesma 14'; Jeršovas 35'

SKK Peterburgsky, Saint Petersburg
Attendance: 3,500
Referee: Sergey Gorokhovodatskiy (Kazakhstan)

=== Semifinals ===
25 January 2008
16:00

Khazar Lankaran (Azerbaijan)	2 – 1	(Belarus) BATE Borisov
Amirguliyev 71', 88'		Rodionov 72'

SKK Peterburgsky, Saint Petersburg
Attendance: 2,000
Referee: Andrejs Sipailo (Latvia)
25 January 2008
19:00

FBK Kaunas (Lithuania)	1 – 3	(Uzbekistan) Pakhtakor Tashkent
G.Kvaratskhelia 15' (pen.)		Magdeev 3'; Soliev 27'; Kholmatov 80'

SKK Peterburgsky, Saint Petersburg
Attendance: 1,000
Referee: Oleh Oriekhov (Ukraine)

=== Finals ===
27 January 2008
14:00

Khazar Lankaran (Azerbaijan)	4 – 3	(Uzbekistan) Pakhtakor Tashkent
Ramazanov 43'; Amirguliyev 6'; Diego Gusmão 49'; Mário Souza 65'		Soliev 17' (pen.); Z.Tadjiyev 75'; Inomov 57'

SKK Peterburgsky, Saint Petersburg
Attendance: 6,000
Referee: Nikolai Ivanov (Russia)

== Top scorers ==
Rank	Player	Team	Goals
1	(Belarus) Vladimir Yurchenko	(Russia) Zenit Saint Petersburg	4
2	(Azerbaijan) Rahid Amirguliyev	(Azerbaijan) Khazar Lankaran	3
2	(Brazil) Mário Souza	(Azerbaijan) Khazar Lankaran	3
2	(Uzbekistan) Zayniddin Tadjiyev	(Uzbekistan) Pakhtakor Tashkent	3
2	(Uzbekistan) Anvarjon Soliev	(Uzbekistan) Pakhtakor Tashkent	3
2	(Belarus) Vitali Rodionov	(Belarus) BATE Borisov	3
2	(Brazil) Rafael Ledesma	(Lithuania) FBK Kaunas	3
2	(Latvia) Vīts Rimkus	(Latvia) Ventspils	3
2	(Burkina Faso) Ibrahim Gnanou	(Moldova) Sheriff Tiraspol	3
