= Edmond N'Tiamoah =

Ghanaian footballer (born 1981)

Personal information
- Full name: Edmond N'Tiamoah
- Date of birth: February 1, 1981 (age 45)
- Place of birth: Swedru, Ghana
- Height: 1.87 m (6 ft 2 in)
- Position: Striker

Youth career
- –1999: Mulhouse
- 1999–2000: Basel

Senior career*
Years	Team	Apps	(Gls)
2000–2002	Basel	14	(0)
2001	→ Delemont (loan)	5	(0)
2002–2005	Concordia Basel	72	(17)
2004	→ Diyarbakirspor (loan)	3	(0)
2005–2007	Luzern	48	(20)
2007	Khazar Lankaran	19	(10)
2008–2009	Servette	30	(9)
2010	Schötz	3	(0)
2010–2014	Kriens	81	(21)
2014–2018	Ibach		
- * Club domestic league appearances and goals

Edmond N'Tiamoah (born 1 February 1981) is a Ghanaian former footballer who played as striker. He is now the logistics manager for the confectionery firm Bachmann in Switzerland.

== Career ==
=== Early years ===
Born in Swedru Ghana N'Tiamoah moved to France with his family while he was still at a young age and since then he also holds a French passport. He played his youth football with local club Mulhouse advancing regularly towards their first team, who played in the French second-tier until they suffered relegation in the 1998–99 season. A financial crisis followed and the club was bankrupted in 1999. The player then left the club.

=== Basel ===
N'Tiamoah then moved to FC Basel's youth department in Switzerland in 1999 and here he started his professional career. He advanced to Basel's first team during the winter break of their 1999–2000 season under head coach Christian Gross. After playing in nine test games N'Tiamoah played his domestic league debut for the club in the away game in the Stade Olympique de la Pontaise on 12 March 2000 as Basel played a goalless draw with Lausanne-Sport. He scored his first goal for his team in the Swiss Cup on 12 April. But his goal could not help the team, as Basel were defeated 3–2 by the same opponent Lausanne-Sport. Basel played a relatively good Championship round and the team finished the season in third position. N'Tiamoah came to 12 appearances, mainly as substitute, in the 14 league games.

In their following season, N'Tiamoah was again only receiving playing time as substitute and so during the second half of the season he was loaned out to SR Delémont. As he returned for the 2001–02 season, also due to injuries, he could not obtain a place in the team, so he left the club. During his time with the club, he played a total of 51 games for Basel scoring a total of two goals. 26 of these games were in the Nationalliga A, one in the Swiss Cup, three in the 2000–01 UEFA Cup and 21 were friendly games. He scored one goal in the cup and the other was scored during the test games.

=== Concordia ===
N'Tiamoah stayed in town but moved onto Concordia Basel, who at that time played in the second tier of Swiss football. He was a regular played and goal scorer. Nevertheless, he was loaned out for six months to Turkish club Diyarbakirspor. As he returned for the 2004–05 Challenge League season he was regular starter, having 30 appearances, scoring 8 goals. The team ended the season in the seventh position, however his contract was not extended and he left the club.

=== Luzern ===
In the summer of 2005 N'Tiamoah signed for Luzern under head coach René van Eck, in the second tier of Swiss football, and here he re-discovered his form. The year before the club had signed Jean-Michel Tchouga, with whom N'Tiamoah had played together during their time in Basel, and together they formed the team's new attacking duo. To the beginning of the 2005–06 Challenge League season, the FCL lost three times in a row. Then Tchouga netted both goals in a 2–2 home draw against SC Kriens, which didn't turn the tide, but it did get the first point. FCL were not defeated again that season and they scored at least one goal in each of the next 31 games. The team rose to first place in the table and with 79 points, became division champions and achieved promotion. 45 of the 69 FCL goals were scored by the attacking duo, team captain Tchouga was the Challenge League top scorer with 27 goals, N'Tiamoah netted 18 times.

The duo stayed with the club for the 2006–07 league season and were successful in reaching the 2006–07 Swiss Cup final and avoiding relegation. However, because N'Tiamoah did not really understand himself with the team's new head coach Ciriaco Sforza, the striker left the club during the winter break.

=== Lankaran ===
During February 2007, N'Tiamoah moved Azerbaijan and signed a one-year contract with Khazar Lankaran with an option for a further year. He joined the team for their 2006–07 season under manager Aghasalim Mirjavadov. At the end of the season the team were champions in the 2006–07 Azerbaijan Top League and were double winners as they lifted the 2006–07 Azerbaijan Cup. N'Tiamoah had nine appearances, scoring four goals.

He stayed with the club for their 2007–08 season, but left the club as his contract expired at the end of the year. He had ten league appearances, scoring six goals. In the qualifying round to the 2007–08 UEFA Champions League match on 24 July 2007 against Dinamo Zagreb N'Tiamoah was booked twice and was therefore dismissed.

=== Later years ===
At the end of the year N'Tiamoah returned to Switzerland but moved on to play for Servette, signing an 18-month contract. Servette, at that time, played in the second tier of Swiss football and were involved in a hard fight against relegation, but they were able to hold their place in the division.

As his contract with Servette expired, N'Tiamoah was without a club and returned to central Switzerland, where he had met his girlfriend. He kept himself fit training with FC Schötz, who at that time played in the 1. Liga, the fourth level. In January 2011 he signed for SC Kriens in the second tier, where he met up again with is friend Jean-Michel Tchouga. He played for Kriens for 18 months, but the team were relegated and then he retired from professional football. He remained with the club and played for them a further two years. He ended his active football playing for amateur club FC Ibach.

== Private life ==
After finishing school, aged 15, N'Tiamoah successfully completed his apprenticeship as book-keeper in Mulhouse, before he became footballer. His sister Brigitte is active in athletics and as sprinter represented France during the 2016 Summer Olympics in Rio. N'Tiamoah is married and the couple have a son and a daughter and live in central Switzerland. After his football career N'Tiamoah applied for a job as van driver for the confectionery firm Bachmann. In the meantime he has risen to become their logistics manager.

== Honours ==
FC Luzern

- Swiss Challenge League: 2005–06

Khazar Lankaran

- Azerbaijan Premier League: 2006–07
- Azerbaijan Cup: 2006–07

== Sources ==
- Die ersten 125 Jahre. Publisher: Josef Zindel im Friedrich Reinhardt Verlag, Basel. ISBN 978-3-7245-2305-5
- Verein "Basler Fussballarchiv" Homepage
