= Maksim Medvedev =

Azerbaijani footballer (born 1989)

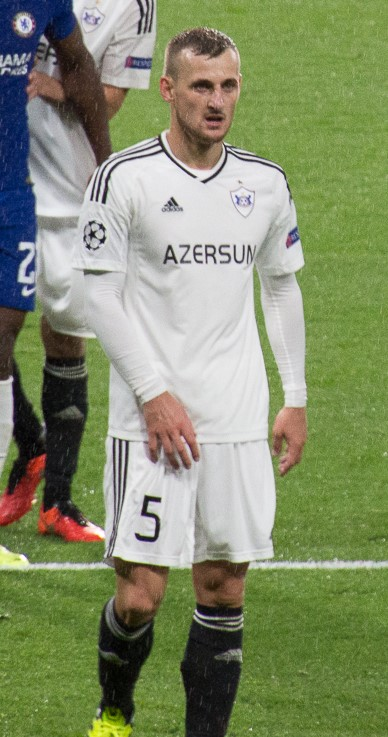
- Medvedev playing against Chelsea in 2017

Personal information
- Full name: Maksim Borisoviç Medvedev
- Date of birth: 29 September 1989 (age 37)
- Place of birth: Baku, Azerbaijan SSR, Soviet Union
- Height: 1.80 m (5 ft 11 in)
- Position: Right-back

Team information
- Current team: Qarabağ-2 (manager)

Youth career
- 2004–2006: Qarabağ

Senior career*
Years	Team	Apps	(Gls)
2006–2024	Qarabağ	376	(12)

International career
2005–2006	Azerbaijan U17	3	(0)
2006–2008	Azerbaijan U19	9	(0)
2008–2009	Azerbaijan U21	6	(0)
2009–2024	Azerbaijan	81	(4)

Managerial career
- 2025: Qarabağ (youth assistant)
- 2025–: Qarabağ-2
- * Club domestic league appearances and goals

Maksim Borisoviç Medvedev (Russian: Максим Борисович Медведев; born 29 September 1989) is an Azerbaijani professional football manager and a former player who played as a right-back. He is the manager of Qarabağ-2, the reserve team of Qarabağ, the club he spent his entire career at. He was also a member and captain of Azerbaijan national team.

== Club career ==
Born in Baku, Azerbaijan SSR (present-day Azerbaijan), Medvedev was a product of the Qarabağ youth system. He primarily plays as a right-back defender, but can also be utilized as a left-back or centre-back defender.

Medvedev has spent his entire career at Qarabağ since becoming a professional player in 2006. He is the most capped player in the history of the club and 11th most capped player in the history of Azerbaijan Premier League. He has won the Premier League ten times and Azerbaijan Cup six times with his team. He also holds the record among Azerbaijani players for most caps in UEFA competitions (126 games).

Maksim retired at the end of 2023–24 season, playing his entire career for Qarabağ.

== International career ==
Medvedev made his Azerbaijan U21 national team debut in 2008, having previously played for U17 and U19 teams.

He became a regular starter for the senior national team during World Cup 2010 qualifying games after Qarabağ FK's successful Europa League campaign in 2009. On 3 June 2016, Medvedev lead the Azerbaijan national team against Canada as a team captain. He scored his first international goal on 8 October 2016 against Norway, securing a 1–0 victory for his team. After the retirement of Rashad Sadyghov and Kamran Aghayev from the national team, Medvedev was selected as the new team captain in early 2019. He has led the team as captain in 28 games between 2019 and 2022. He is the second most capped player in its history with 81 caps.

== Career statistics ==
=== Club ===
Appearances and goals by club, season and competition
Club	Season	League			Azerbaijan Cup		Europe		Total	
Club	Season	Division	Apps	Goals	Apps	Goals	Apps	Goals	Apps	Goals
Qarabağ	2006–07	Azerbaijan Premier League	11	0			—		11	0
Qarabağ	2007–08	Azerbaijan Premier League	18	0			—		18	0
Qarabağ	2008–09	Azerbaijan Premier League	20	0			—		20	0
Qarabağ	2009–10	Azerbaijan Premier League	25	0	2	0	6	0	33	0
Qarabağ	2010–11	Azerbaijan Premier League	18	0	1	0	7	0	26	0
Qarabağ	2011–12	Azerbaijan Premier League	25	2	5	0	6	0	36	2
Qarabağ	2012–13	Azerbaijan Premier League	24	1	3	0	—		27	1
Qarabağ	2013–14	Azerbaijan Premier League	32	2	3	0	8	0	43	2
Qarabağ	2014–15	Azerbaijan Premier League	23	1	6	1	9	0	38	2
Qarabağ	2015–16	Azerbaijan Premier League	26	0	4	0	8	0	38	0
Qarabağ	2016–17	Azerbaijan Premier League	20	3	5	0	11	0	36	3
Qarabağ	2017–18	Azerbaijan Premier League	22	1	0	0	12	0	34	1
Qarabağ	2018–19	Azerbaijan Premier League	21	0	3	0	14	1	38	1
Qarabağ	2019–20	Azerbaijan Premier League	17	0	2	0	14	1	33	1
Qarabağ	2020–21	Azerbaijan Premier League	23	1	4	1	6	0	33	2
Qarabağ	2021–22	Azerbaijan Premier League	19	1	4	0	13	1	36	2
Qarabağ	2022–23	Azerbaijan Premier League	15	0	1	0	5	0	21	0
Qarabağ	2023–24	Azerbaijan Premier League	17	0	1	0	7	0	25	0
Career total			376	12	50	2	126	3	552	17

=== International ===
Appearances and goals by national team and year
National team	Year	Apps	Goals
Azerbaijan	2009	3	0
Azerbaijan	2010	7	0
Azerbaijan	2011	1	0
Azerbaijan	2012	6	0
Azerbaijan	2013	8	0
Azerbaijan	2014	3	0
Azerbaijan	2015	5	0
Azerbaijan	2016	7	1
Azerbaijan	2017	2	0
Azerbaijan	2018	12	2
Azerbaijan	2019	6	0
Azerbaijan	2020	5	1
Azerbaijan	2021	11	0
Azerbaijan	2022	5	0
Total		81	4

Scores and results list Azerbaijan's goal tally first, score column indicates score after each Medvedev goal.

List of international goals scored by Maksim Medvedev
No.	Date	Venue	Opponent	Score	Result	Competition
1	8 October 2016	Baku Olympic Stadium, Baku, Azerbaijan	Norway	1–0	1–0	2018 FIFA World Cup qualification
2	29 May 2018	Baku Olympic Stadium, Baku, Azerbaijan	Kyrgyzstan	1–0	3–0	Friendly
3	9 June 2018	Daugava Stadium, Riga, Latvia	Latvia	1–0	3–1	Friendly
4	8 September 2020	GSP Stadium, Nicosia, Cyprus	Cyprus	1-0	1–0	2020–21 UEFA Nations League

== Honours ==
Qarabağ

- Azerbaijan Premier League (10): 2013–14, 2014–15, 2015–16, 2016–17, 2017–18, 2018–19, 2019–20, 2021–22, 2022–23, 2023–24,
- Azerbaijan Cup (6): 2008–09, 2014–15, 2015–16, 2016–17, 2021–22, 2023–24

Individual

- Azerbaijani Footballer of the Year runner-up: 2016, 2018
