= Emin Quliyev =

Azerbaijani footballer and coach (born 1977)

Personal information
- Full name: Emin Quliyev
- Date of birth: 12 April 1977 (age 49)
- Place of birth: Baku, Azerbaijan SSR, Soviet Union
- Position: Midfielder

Senior career*
Years	Team	Apps	(Gls)
1997–1999	Dinamo Baki	45	(2)
2000	Kapaz Ganja	8	(1)
2001	→ Litex Lovech (loan)	3	(0)
2001	Cherno More Varna		(?)
2002	Neftchi Baku	16	(2)
2003	Spartak-Alania Vladikavkaz	6	(0)
2004–2005	Neftchi Baku	33	(5)
2005–2009	Khazar Lankaran	70	(10)
2009–2010	FK Karvan	5	(0)
2010	FC Absheron		
2011	Simurq	3	(0)

International career^{‡}
2000–2008	Azerbaijan	48	(3)

Managerial career
- 2012: Khazar Lankaran (Interim)
- 2013: Khazar Lankaran (Interim)
- 2015–2016: Ravan Baku
- * Club domestic league appearances and goals as of 22 July 2015 ‡ National team caps and goals as of 2 July 2009

Emin Quliyev (born 12 April 1977) is a former Azerbaijani football player and now a coach.

== Honours ==
"Kapaz" Ganja

- Azerbaijan Cup: 1999–2000,

Neftchi Baku

- Azerbaijan Premier League: 2003–04
- Azerbaijan Cup: 2003–04

Khazar Lankaran

- Azerbaijan Premier League: 2006–07
- Azerbaijan Cup: 2006–07, 2007–08
- CIS Cup: 2008

== National team statistics ==
Azerbaijan national team
Year	Apps	Goals
2000	5	0
2001	5	0
2002	8	0
2003	8	0
2004	8	3
2005	7	0
2006	0	0
2007	4	0
2008	3	0
Total	48	3

=== International goals ===
#	Date	Venue	Opponent	Score	Result	Competition
1.	28 April 2004	Almaty, Kazakhstan	Kazakhstan	1–2	2-3	Friendly
2.	28 May 2004	Baku, Azerbaijan	Uzbekistan	3–1	3-1	Friendly
3.	6 June 2004	Riga, Latvia	Latvia	1–1	2-2	Friendly

== Managerial statistics ==
Name	Nat.	From	To	P	W	D	L	GS	GA	%W	Honours	Notes
Khazar Lankaran	Azerbaijan	Oct 2012	Nov 2012	1	1	0	0	0	0	100.00		
Khazar Lankaran	Azerbaijan	Feb 2013	Mar 2013	4	2	1	1	0	0	50.00		
Ravan Baku	Azerbaijan	Jul 2015		5	0	2	3	4	8	0.00		
