= Rahid Amirguliyev =

Azerbaijani footballer (born 1989)

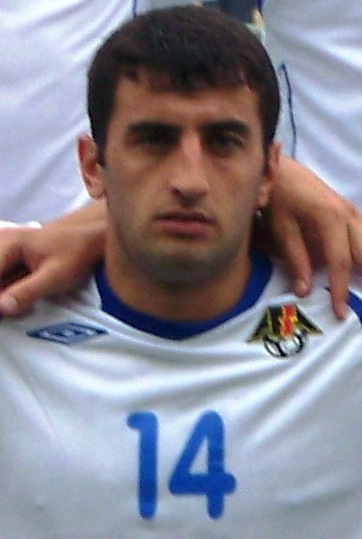

Personal information
- Full name: Rahid Alakbar Oglu Amirguliyev
- Date of birth: 1 September 1989 (age 37)
- Place of birth: Qusar, Azerbaijan SSR, Soviet Union
- Height: 1.72 m (5 ft 8 in)
- Position: Midfielder

Senior career*
| Years | Team | Apps | (Gls) |
| 2005–2006 | Sahdag Qusar | 57 | (7) |
| 2006–2015 | Khazar Lankaran | 253 | (23) |
| 2015–2018 | Qarabağ | 37 | (3) |
| 2018–2023 | Sabail | 105 | (2) |
| Total | | 452 | (35) |

International career^{‡}
| 2003–2005 | Azerbaijan U17 | 6 | (2) |
| 2005–2007 | Azerbaijan U19 | 11 | (1) |
| 2007–2009 | Azerbaijan U21 | 7 | (0) |
| 2007–2017 | Azerbaijan | 59 | (3) |
- * Club domestic league appearances and goals as of 25 June 2023 ‡ National team caps and goals as of 8 October 2017

Rahid Amirguliyev (Azerbaijani: Rahid Əmirquliyev, born on 1 September 1989) is a former Azerbaijani professional footballer who played as a midfielder. He is the most capped player in the history of Azerbaijan Premier League with over 450 caps.

== Career ==
On 21 December 2015, Amirguliyev signed a 2.5-year contract with Qarabağ FK.

On 24 May 2018, Qarabağ announced that Amirguliyev had been released by the club following the expiration of his contract. On 26 May 2018, Sabail FK announced the signing of Amirguliyev.

On 23 June 2023, Amirguliyev announced his retirement from football.

== Career statistics ==
=== Club ===
As of match played 9 December 2018

Appearances and goals by club, season and competition
| Club | Season | League | | | National Cup | | Continental | | Other | | Total | |
| Club | Season | Division | Apps | Goals | Apps | Goals | Apps | Goals | Apps | Goals | Apps | Goals |
|---|---|---|---|---|---|---|---|---|---|---|---|---|
| Shahdag Qusar | 2003–04 | Top League | 16 | 3 | | | - | | - | | 16 | 3 |
| Shahdag Qusar | 2004–05 | Top League | 26 | 1 | | | - | | - | | 26 | 1 |
| Shahdag Qusar | 2005–06 | Top League | 15 | 3 | | | - | | - | | 15 | 3 |
| Shahdag Qusar | Total | | 57 | 7 | | | - | - | - | - | 57 | 7 |
| Khazar Lankaran | 2006–07 | Premier League | 17 | 5 | | | - | | - | | 17 | 5 |
| Khazar Lankaran | 2007–08 | Premier League | 16 | 1 | | | 2 | 0 | - | | 18 | 1 |
| Khazar Lankaran | 2008–09 | Premier League | 24 | 4 | | | 2 | 0 | - | | 26 | 4 |
| Khazar Lankaran | 2009–10 | Premier League | 25 | 1 | | | - | | - | | 25 | 1 |
| Khazar Lankaran | 2010–11 | Premier League | 30 | 0 | 6 | 1 | 2 | 0 | - | | 38 | 1 |
| Khazar Lankaran | 2011–12 | Premier League | 31 | 5 | 3 | 0 | 2 | 0 | - | | 36 | 5 |
| Khazar Lankaran | 2012–13 | Premier League | 30 | 1 | 6 | 2 | 4 | 0 | - | | 40 | 3 |
| Khazar Lankaran | 2013–14 | Premier League | 31 | 0 | 5 | 0 | 3 | 0 | 1 | 0 | 40 | 0 |
| Khazar Lankaran | 2014–15 | Premier League | 31 | 2 | 2 | 0 | - | | - | | 33 | 2 |
| Khazar Lankaran | 2015–16 | Premier League | 18 | 4 | 1 | 0 | - | | - | | 19 | 4 |
| Khazar Lankaran | Total | | 253 | 23 | 23 | 3 | 15 | 0 | 1 | 0 | 292 | 26 |
| Qarabağ | 2015–16 | Premier League | 2 | 0 | 1 | 0 | 0 | 0 | - | | 3 | 0 |
| Qarabağ | 2016–17 | Premier League | 20 | 3 | 5 | 1 | 6 | 1 | - | | 31 | 5 |
| Qarabağ | 2017–18 | Premier League | 15 | 0 | 2 | 0 | 1 | 0 | - | | 18 | 0 |
| Qarabağ | Total | | 37 | 3 | 8 | 1 | 7 | 1 | - | - | 52 | 5 |
| Sabail | 2018–19 | Premier League | 13 | 0 | 0 | 0 | - | | - | | 13 | 0 |
| Career total | | | 360 | 33 | 31 | 4 | 22 | 1 | 1 | 0 | 414 | 37 |

=== National team ===
As of match played 6 September 2015

Azerbaijan national team
| Year | Apps | Goals |
|---|---|---|
| 2007 | 3 | 0 |
| 2009 | 1 | 0 |
| 2010 | 6 | 0 |
| 2011 | 9 | 0 |
| 2012 | 8 | 0 |
| 2013 | 7 | 1 |
| 2014 | 5 | 0 |
| 2015 | 8 | 2 |
| 2016 | 4 | 0 |
| 2017 | 7 | 0 |
| 2018 | 1 | 0 |
| Total | 59 | 3 |

=== International goals ===
| # | Date | Venue | Opponent | Score | Result | Competition |
|---|---|---|---|---|---|---|
| 1. | 7 September 2013 | Ramat Gan, Israel | Israel | 1–0 | 1–1 | 2014 FIFA World Cup Qualifying |
| 2. | 6 September 2015 | Ta' Qali, Malta | Malta | 1–0 | 2–2 | 2016 UEFA Euro Qualifying |
| 3. | 6 September 2015 | Ta' Qali, Malta | Malta | 2–2 | 2–2 | 2016 UEFA Euro Qualifying |

== Honours ==
=== Club ===
Khazar Lankaran

- Azerbaijan Premier League (1): 2006–07
- Azerbaijan Cup (3): 2006–07, 2007–08, 2010–11
- Azerbaijan Supercup (1): 2013
- CIS Cup (1): 2008

Qarabağ FK

- Azerbaijan Premier League (2): 2015–16, 2016–17
- Azerbaijan Cup: (1) 2015–16

Individual

- Azerbaijani Footballer of the Year: 2015
