= Afran Ismayilov =

Azerbaijani footballer (born 1988)

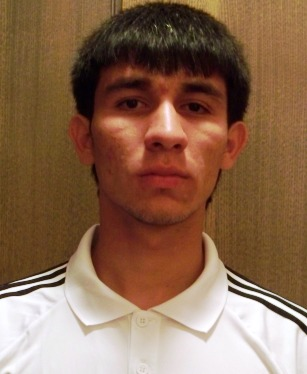

Personal information
- Full name: Afran Amit oglu İsmayılov
- Date of birth: 8 October 1988 (age 38)
- Place of birth: Baku, Azerbaijan SSR
- Height: 1.83 m (6 ft 0 in)
- Position: Right midfielder

Team information
- Current team: Araz-Naxçıvan (assistant coach)

Senior career*
Years	Team	Apps	(Gls)
2006–2013	Qarabağ	100	(13)
2009	→ Turan Tovuz (loan)	10	(2)
2013–2014	Baku	17	(8)
2014	Khazar Lankaran	11	(1)
2015	Keşla	10	(3)
2015–2018	Qarabağ	63	(9)
2018–2019	Sumgayit	20	(3)
2019–2020	Keşla	15	(0)
2020–2022	Sabail	34	(3)
2022–2023	Kapaz	4	(1)

International career
2008–2010	Azerbaijan U21	6	(0)
2010–2018	Azerbaijan	38	(5)

Managerial career
- 2023–: Araz-Naxçıvan (assistant)
- * Club domestic league appearances and goals

Afran Ismayilov (Azerbaijani: Əfran İsmayılov, born on 8 October 1988) is an Azerbaijani professional football coach and a former midfielder who is an assistant coach with Araz-Naxçıvan.

== Early years ==
Ismayilov was born in Baku, Azerbaijan, started playing football at age 8 and attended Neftchi Baku football school under Rovshan Gasimov.

== Career ==
=== Club ===
Ismayilov began his career at the FK Qarabağ academy in 2004 after being chosen as one of three talents among 1200 amateur players. He was one of key players for FK Qarabağ's good performances in club's 2010–11 UEFA Europa League qualification campaign, having scored 5 goals against opponents.

In July 2014, Ismayilov moved to Khazar Lankaran along with Rauf Aliyev. After six months with Khazar, Ismayilov signed a six-month deal with Inter Baku.

On 24 May 2018, Qarabağ announced that Ismayilov had been released by the club following expiration of his contract.

On 11 June 2018, Ismayilov signed one-year contract with Sumgayit FK.

On 13 August 2019, Ismayilov signed a one-year contract with Keşla FK. On 29 June, Keşla announced Ismayilov's contract hadn't been renewed and he'd left the club.

=== International ===
Ismayilov is a part of the Azerbaijan U-21 side that is competing in the 2011 European Under-21 Championship qualification.

In 2010, he was called up for the Azerbaijan national football team and scored his first goal on his debut in friendly match against Jordan national football team in Amman.

== Career statistics ==
=== Club ===
As of match played 12 May 2018

Appearances and goals by club, season and competition
Club	Season	League			National Cup		League Cup		Continental		Other		Total	
Club	Season	Division	Apps	Goals	Apps	Goals	Apps	Goals	Apps	Goals	Apps	Goals	Apps	Goals
Qarabağ	2006–07	Azerbaijan Premier League	7	0			-		-		-		7	0
Qarabağ	2007–08	Azerbaijan Premier League	6	0			-		-		-		6	0
Qarabağ	2008–09	Azerbaijan Premier League	1	0			-		-		-		1	0
Qarabağ	2009–10	Azerbaijan Premier League	27	5			-		4	0	-		31	5
Qarabağ	2010–11	Azerbaijan Premier League	12	1	0	0	-		6	5	-		18	6
Qarabağ	2011–12	Azerbaijan Premier League	25	6	4	1	-		5	0	-		34	7
Qarabağ	2012–13	Azerbaijan Premier League	22	1	5	1	-		-		-		27	2
Qarabağ	Total		100	13			-	-	15	5	-	-	115	18
Turan-Tovuz (loan)	2008–09	Azerbaijan Premier League	10	2			-		–		–		10	2
Baku	2013–14	Azerbaijan Premier League	17	8	0	0	–		–		–		17	8
Khazar Lankaran	2014–15	Azerbaijan Premier League	11	1	0	0	–		–		–		11	1
Inter Baku	2014–15	Azerbaijan Premier League	10	3	3	1	–		–		–		13	4
Qarabağ	2015–16	Azerbaijan Premier League	29	6	5	0	-		9	1	-		43	7
Qarabağ	2016–17	Azerbaijan Premier League	21	1	6	0	-		9	0	-		36	1
Qarabağ	2017–18	Azerbaijan Premier League	13	2	3	1	-		8	1	-		24	4
Qarabağ	Total		63	9	14	1	-	-	26	2	-	-	103	12
Career total			211	28	26	4	-	-	41	7	-	-	278	39

=== International ===
Azerbaijan national team
Year	Apps	Goals
2010	1	1
2011	7	0
2012	4	0
2013	5	0
2014	1	0
2015	8	0
2016	5	1
2017	6	3
2018	1	0
Total	38	5

Statistics accurate as of match played 30 January 2018

=== International goals ===
Scores and results list Azerbaijan's goal tally first.

#	Date	Venue	Opponent	Score	Result	Competition
1.	25 February 2010	King Abdullah Stadium, Amman, Jordan	Jordan	2–0	2–0	Friendly
2.	29 May 2016	Sportplatz Bad Erlach, Bad Erlach, Austria	Macedonia	1–2	1–3	Friendly
3.	4 September 2017	Bakcell Arena, Baku, Azerbaijan	San Marino	1–0	5–1	2018 FIFA World Cup qualification
4.	4 September 2017	Bakcell Arena, Baku, Azerbaijan	San Marino	3–0	5–1	2018 FIFA World Cup qualification
5.	5 October 2017	Baku Olympic Stadium, Baku, Azerbaijan	Czech Republic	1–1	1–2	2018 FIFA World Cup qualification
Correct as of 5 October 2017

== Honours ==
Qarabağ

- Azerbaijan Premier League: 2015–16, 2016–17
