= Ramiz Kerimov =

Azerbaijani footballer (born 1981)

Personal information
- Date of birth: August 4, 1981 (age 45)
- Place of birth: Baku, Azerbaijani SSR, Soviet Union
- Height: 1.80 m (5 ft 11 in)
- Position: Goalkeeper

Senior career*
Years	Team	Apps	(Gls)
1997–1998	U-18		(0)
1999–2002	Khazar Universiteti		(0)
2003–2004	MOIK Baku	12	(0)
2004–2005	Shahdag Qusar	3	(0)
2005–2006	Göyazan Qazax	9	(0)
2006–2009	Khazar Lankaran	1	(0)
- * Club domestic league appearances and goals as of 25 June 2014 ‡ National team caps and goals as of 25 June 2014

Ramiz Kerimov (born 4 August 1981, Azerbaijani: Ramiz Kərimov) is an Azerbaijani former football goalkeeper.

== Career statistics ==
As of 17 May 2014

Club performance			League		Cup		Continental		Other		Total	
Season	Club	League	Apps	Goals	Apps	Goals	Apps	Goals	Apps	Goals	Apps	Goals
2003-04	MOIK Baku	Azerbaijan Premier League	12	0			-		-		12	0
2004-05	Shahdag Qusar	Azerbaijan Premier League	3	0			-		-		3	0
2005-06	Göyazan Qazax	Azerbaijan Premier League	9	0			-		-		9	0
2006-07	Khazar Lankaran	Azerbaijan Premier League	0	0		0	-		-		0	0
2007-08	Khazar Lankaran	Azerbaijan Premier League	0	0	0	0	0	0	0	0	0	0
2008-09	Khazar Lankaran	Azerbaijan Premier League	1	0	0	0	0	0	-		1	0
Total	Azerbaijan		25	0							25	0
Career total			25	0							25	0
