= 2003–04 Azerbaijan Cup =

2003-04 Azerbaijan Cup
Tournament details
- Country: Azerbaijan
- Teams: 20

Final positions
- Champions: Neftchi Baku
- Runners-up: Shamkir

Tournament statistics
- Matches played: 35
- Goals scored: 108 (3.09 per match)

The Azerbaijan Cup 2003–04 was the 12th season of the annual cup competition in Azerbaijan with the final taking place on 9 May 2004. Twenty teams competed in this year's competition. Neftchi Baku were the defending champions.

== First round ==
The first legs were played on September 20, 2003 and the second legs on October 5, 2003.

Team 1	Agg.	Team 2	1st leg	2nd leg
Karat Baki	1–2	Kapaz	1–0	0–2
Energetik Mingacevir	5–1	Sahdag Qusar	3–0	2–1
Adliyya Baku	4–1	Siyazan Broiler	3–0	1–1
Lider-Karabakh Agdam	4–1	SAF Baku	4–1	0–0

== Round of 16 ==
The first legs were played on October 18 and 19, 2003 and the second legs on November 1 and 2, 2003.

Team 1	Agg.	Team 2	1st leg	2nd leg
Neftchi Baku	w/o	Lokomotiv İmişli	w/o	w/o
Gänclärbirliyi Sumqayit	3–2	Dinamo Baku	2–0	1–2
Kapaz	9–3	Khazar Sumqayit	6–2	3–1
Turan Tovuz	2–6	Karabakh	2–3	0–3
Adliyya Baku	1–2	MOIK Baku	0–2	1–0
Lider-Karabakh Agdam	1–22	Shafa Baku	0–14	1–8
Energetik Mingacevir	0–6	Shamkir	0–3	0–3
Bakili Baku	3–1	Khazar Universiteti Baku	3–0	0–1

== Quarterfinals ==
The first legs were played on March 17, 2004 and the second legs on March 23, 2004.

Team 1	Agg.	Team 2	1st leg	2nd leg
MOIK Baku	0–2	Bakili Baku	0–0	0–2
Neftchi Baku	7–1	Shafa Baku	6–1	1–0
Gänclärbirliyi Sumqayit	0–5	Karabakh	0–0	0–5
Kapaz	0–5	Shamkir	0–0	0–5

== Semifinals ==
The first legs were played on April 14, 2004 and the second legs on April 22, 2004.

Team 1	Agg.	Team 2	1st leg	2nd leg
Bakili Baku	1–1 (p. 3–5)	Neftchi Baku	1–0	0–1
Karabakh	1–4	Shamkir	1–2	0–2

== Final ==
9 May 2004
AZST (UTC+5)

Neftchi Baku	1–0 (a.e.t.)	Shamkir
Abbasov 104'

Tofiq Bahramov Stadium, Baku
Attendance: 8,000
Referee: Imanxan Sultani
