= Issa Nikiema =

Burkinabé footballer

Personal information
- Full name: Issa Nikiema
- Date of birth: January 23, 1978 (age 48)
- Place of birth: Ouagadougou, Upper Volta
- Height: 5 ft 7 in (1.70 m)
- Position: Striker

Youth career
- 1999–2000: Etoile Filante

Senior career*
Years	Team	Apps	(Gls)
2000–2001	RS Settat	42	(1)
2001–2002	Borussia Fulda	5	(0)
2002–2004	ASFA Yennega	88	(20)
2004–2005	FK Genclerbirliyi Sumqayit	43	(27)
2005	PFC Turan Tovuz	12	(2)
2005	Neftçi PFK	1	(1)
2006–2007	FK Genclerbirliyi Sumqayit	23	(4)
2007	Olympic Alexandria		
2008–2009	Al-Muharraq		

International career
2004	Burkina Faso	9	(0)
- * Club domestic league appearances and goals as of 20:37, 18 December 2008 (UTC)

Issa Nikiema (born 23 January 1978) is a Burkinabé former football midfielder.

== Career ==
On 29 October 2001 Nikiema moved from RS Settat to Borussia Fulda on a free transfer.

Nikiema joined Gänclärbirliyi Sumqayit at the start of 2004, scoring 11 goals in 12 league games. The following season, Nikiema was the club's top goalscorer with 16, which was the 5th best in the league. Nikiema joined Turan Tovuz for the first half of the 2005–06, before returning to Gänclärbirliyi Sumqayit for the remainder of the season and the next season.

=== Azerbaijan statistics ===
Club performance			League		Cup		Continental		Total	
Season	Club	League	Apps	Goals	Apps	Goals	Apps	Goals	Apps	Goals
2003-04	Gänclärbirliyi Sumqayit	Azerbaijan First Division	12	11			-		12	11
2004–05	Gänclärbirliyi Sumqayit	Azerbaijan Premier League	31	16			-		31	16
2005–06	Turan Tovuz	Azerbaijan Premier League	12	2			-		12	2
2005–06	Gänclärbirliyi Sumqayit	Azerbaijan Premier League	11	0			-		11	0
2006–07	Gänclärbirliyi Sumqayit	Azerbaijan Premier League	12	4			-		12	4
Career total			78	33	0	0	0	0	78	33

== Honors ==
Neftchi Baku

- CIS Cup

Runners-up: 2005
