= Peycho Deliminkov =

Bulgarian football defender

Personal information
- Full name: Peycho Deliminkov
- Date of birth: 11 June 1984 (age 42)
- Place of birth: Burgas, Bulgaria
- Height: 1.86 m (6 ft 1 in)
- Position: Defender

Youth career
- Naftex Burgas

Senior career*
| Years | Team | Apps | (Gls) |
| 2003–2004 | FC Pomorie | ? | (?) |
| 2004–2006 | Naftex | 19 | (0) |
| 2006–2007 | Pietà Hotspurs | ? | (?) |
| 2008 | Beroe | 15 | (0) |
| 2008–2009 | Minyor | 14 | (0) |
| 2009–2010 | PFC Nesebar | ? | (?) |
- * Club domestic league appearances and goals

Peycho Deliminkov (Bulgarian: Пейчо Делиминков) (born 11 June 1984 in Burgas) is a Bulgarian football defender.
