= Tomislav Stanić =

Bosnian-Herzegovinian footballer (born 1981)

Personal information
- Full name: Tomislav Stanić
- Date of birth: 30 May 1981 (age 45)
- Place of birth: SFR Yugoslavia
- Height: 2.02 m (6 ft 8 in)
- Position: Midfielder

Youth career
- NK Tomislav Tomislavgrad

Senior career*
Years	Team	Apps	(Gls)
–2001	Tomislav Tomislavgrad		
2001–2002	Hajduk Split	1	(0)
2003	Troglav Livno		
2003–2005	Inker Zaprešić	4	(0)
2005	Dynamo Dresden	7	(1)
2006	Lokomotiva Zagreb		
2006–2007	Diósgyőr	10	(1)
2007	Inter Baku	4	(0)
2007–2008	Genclerbirliyi Sumqayit	18	(3)
2008–2009	Malavan	15	(0)
- * Club domestic league appearances and goals as of 21:52, May 2009(UTC)

Tomislav Stanić (born 30 May 1981) is a Bosnian-Herzegovinian retired footballer who last played for Malavan in the Iran Pro League.

== Club career ==
Stanić previously played for Hajduk Split and NK Inter Zaprešić in the Croatian First League, making only a handful of substitute appearances over three seasons. He had a brief spell with Dynamo Dresden in the German 2. Bundesliga during the 2005–06 season where he scored 1 goal. He became the first foreign footballer to ever play for Malavan F.C. when he joined the club in 2008.

== Azerbaijan career statistics ==
Club performance			League		Cup		Continental		Total	
Season	Club	League	Apps	Goals	Apps	Goals	Apps	Goals	Apps	Goals
Azerbaijan			League		Azerbaijan Cup		Europe		Total	
2006-07	Inter Baku	Azerbaijan Premier League	4	0			-		4	0
2007-08	Gänclärbirliyi Sumqayit	Azerbaijan Premier League	18	3			-		18	3
Total	Azerbaijan		22	3			0	0	22	3
Career total			22	3			0	0	22	3
