= Zaur Ramazanov =

Azerbaijani footballer (born 1976)

Personal information
- Full name: Zaur Ramazanov
- Date of birth: 27 July 1976 (age 50)
- Place of birth: Azerbaijan SSR, Soviet Union
- Position: Striker

Senior career*
Years	Team	Apps	(Gls)
2002–2003	MOIK Baku	?	(?)
2003–2004	Bakili Baku	20	(14)
2004–2005	Karvan	26	(21)
2005–2008	Khazar Lankaran	69	(33)
2008–2009	Qarabağ	24	(4)
2009–2010	Baku	0	(0)
2010–2011	Karvan	7	(0)
2010	Khazar Lankaran	0	(0)

International career^{‡}
2003–2008	Azerbaijan	14	(0)
- * Club domestic league appearances and goals as of 16 December 2019 ‡ National team caps and goals as of 16 December 2019

Zaur Ramazanov (born 27 July 1976) is a retired Azerbaijani international footballer who played as a striker.

== Career ==
=== Club ===
Ramazanov was top scorer in Azerbaijan Premier League season 2004–05, 2006–07.

=== International ===
Ramazanov made 14 appearances for the Azerbaijan national football team.

== Personal life ==
Zaur is the elder brother of fellow Azerbaijan international footballer Aghabala.

== Career statistics ==
=== International ===
Azerbaijan national team
Year	Apps	Goals
2003	2	0
2004	3	1
2005	3	0
2006	0	0
2007	2	0
2008	4	0
Total	14	0

Statistics accurate as of match played 4 June 2008

== Honours ==
=== Club ===
Khazar Lankaran

- Azerbaijan Premier League (1): 2006/07
- Azerbaijan Cup (2): 2006–07, 2007/08
- CIS Cup (1): 2008

=== Individual ===
- Azerbaijan Premier League Top Scorer (2): 2004–05, 2006–07
