= Ilgiz Fattakhov =

Russian footballer

Personal information
- Full name: Ilgiz Suleymanovich Fattakhov
- Date of birth: 7 March 1986 (age 40)
- Height: 1.81 m (5 ft 11 1/2 in)
- Position: Midfielder

Senior career*
Years	Team	Apps	(Gls)
2004	Zheleznodorozhnik Mineralnye Vody		
2005	Kavkaztransgaz Ryzdvyany		(5)
2006–2008	FBK Kaunas	4	(0)
2006	→ Šilutė (loan)	12	(3)
2007	→ MTZ-RIPO Minsk (loan)	2	(0)
2007–2008	→ Šilutė (loan)	29	(2)
2009	Chelyabinsk	6	(0)
2010–2012	Karelia-Discovery Petrozavodsk	20	(14)
- * Club domestic league appearances and goals

Ilgiz Suleymanovich Fattakhov (Russian: Ильгиз Сулейманович Фаттахов; born 7 March 1986) is a former Russian professional football player.
