= 2006–07 Azerbaijan Cup =

2006-07 Azerbaijan Cup
Tournament details
- Country: Azerbaijan
- Teams: 19

Final positions
- Champions: Khazar-Lenkoran
- Runners-up: MKT Araz

Tournament statistics
- Matches played: 65
- Goals scored: 231 (3.55 per match)

The Azerbaijan Cup 2006–07 was the 15th season of the annual cup competition in Azerbaijan with the final taking place on 27 May 2007. Sixteen teams competed in this year's competition. Qarabağ were the defending champions.

== Preliminary round ==
The first legs were played on the 6 September with the seconds leg taking place on 9 September 2006.

| Team 1 | Agg. | Team 2 | 1st leg | 2nd leg |
|---|---|---|---|---|
| Mughan | 1–5 | MKT Araz | 1–2 | 3–0 |
| Qarabağ-2 | 13–0 | Shahdag | 8–0 | 5–0 |
| ANSAD Petrol | 1–4 | Masallı | 0–2 | 1–2 |

== First round ==
The first legs were played on September 11 and 12 while the second legs were played on October 16 and 17, 2006.

| Team 1 | Agg. | Team 2 | 1st leg | 2nd leg |
|---|---|---|---|---|
| Khazar-Lenkoran-2 | 2–9 | Olimpik Baku | 0–2 | 2–7 |
| Khazar-Lenkoran | 12–1 | Goyca Baku | 9–0 | 3–1 |
| Simurq | 9–1 | Arsenal | 5–1 | 4–0 |
| Xocavänd | 1–9 | MKT Araz | 0–1 | 1–8 |
| Rote Fahne | 3–13 | FK Baku | 2–4 | 1–9 |
| Neftchi Baku 2 | 1–8 | Inter Baku | 1–4 | 0–4 |
| Karvan 2 | 0–9 | Gänclärbirliyi Sumqayit | 0–3 | 0–6 |
| Shahdag Qudar | 2–11 | Gilan | 2–5 | 0–6 |
| Adliyya Baku | 1–4 | Shahdag | 0–1 | 1–3 |
| MOIK Baku | 0–6 | Qarabağ | 0–2 | 0–4 |
| ABN Bärdä | 2–4 | Karvan | 1–1 | 1–3 |
| Qaradağ | 0–12 | Turan Tovuz | 0–5 | 0–7 |
| Baku 2 | 0–8 | Neftchi Baku | 0–3 | 0–5 |
| MKT Araz II | 4–0 | Energetik | 3–0 | 1–0 |
| Qarabağ 2 | 0–1 | Bakılı Baku | 0–1 | 0–0 |
| Masallı | w/o | Göyazan | w/o | – |

== Round of 16 ==
The first legs were played on November 19 and 20 while the second legs were played on December 1 and 2, 2006.

| Team 1 | Agg. | Team 2 | 1st leg | 2nd leg |
|---|---|---|---|---|
| Khazar-Lenkoran | 7–0 | Bakili | 4–0 | 3–0 |
| Shahdag | 1–6 | Inter Baku | 1–2 | 0–4 |
| MKT Araz II | 3–10 | Gänclärbirliyi Sumqayit | 1–2 | 2–8 |
| Qäbälä | 0–3 | FK Baku | 0–2 | 0–1 |
| Masallı | 0–2 | MKT Araz | 0–1 | 0–1 |
| Turan Tovuz | 2–1 | Olimpik Baku | 2–0 | 0–1 |
| Qarabağ | 2–2 (a) | Neftchi Baku | 1–2 | 1–0 |
| Simurq | 2–3 | Karvan | 1–1 | 0–1 |

== Quarterfinals ==
The first legs were played on February 25 and 26 while the second legs were played on March 3, 2007.

| Team 1 | Agg. | Team 2 | 1st leg | 2nd leg |
|---|---|---|---|---|
| Inter Baku | 5–2 | Gänclärbirliyi Sumqayit | 2–0 | 3–2 |
| Khazar-Lenkoran | 2–1 | Baku | 2–0 | 0–1 |
| Karvan | 2–3 | MKT Araz | 2–2 | 0–1 |
| Turan Tovuz | 2–8 | Neftchi Baku | 2–7 | 0–1 |

== Semifinals ==
The first legs were played on April 11 and 12, 2007. The second legs were played on April 21 and 22, 2007.

| 13 April 2007 First Leg | Inter Baku | 0 – 1 | Khazar-Lenkoran | Baku |
| AZST (UTC+5) | | | Abdullayev 51' | Stadium: Shafa Stadium; Attendance: 3,500 |

| 22 April 2007 Second Leg | Khazar-Lenkoran | 1 – 0 (2 – 0 agg.) | Inter Baku | Lankaran |
| AZST (UTC+5) | Quliyev 18' (pen.) | | | Stadium: Lankaran City Stadium; Attendance: 11,000 |

| 13 April 2007 First Leg | MKT Araz | 0 – 0 | Neftchi Baku | Imishli |
| AZST (UTC+5) | | | | Stadium: Heydar Aliyev Stadium |

| 23 April 2007 Second Leg | Neftchi Baku | 1 – 1 (1 – 1(a) agg.) | MKT Araz | Baku |
| AZST (UTC+5) | Tagizade 28' | | Aghakishiyev 66' (pen.) | Stadium: Tofiq Bahramov Stadium |

== Final ==
27 May 2007

| Khazar-Lenkoran | 1–0 | MKT Araz |
|---|---|---|
| Karimov 90' |

Tofik Bakhramov Stadium, Baku
Attendance: 15,500
