= Juninho (footballer, born July 1982) =

Brazilian footballer

Personal information
- Full name: Osvaldo José Martins Júnior
- Date of birth: July 7, 1982 (age 44)
- Place of birth: São Simão, Brazil
- Height: 1.75 m (5 ft 9 in)
- Position: Midfielder

Youth career
- 1999–2001: Aomori Yamada HS

Senior career*
Years	Team	Apps	(Gls)
2002	Shimizu S-Pulse	0	(0)
2003	Ventforet Kofu	4	(0)
2003	Sagan Tosu	19	(1)
2004–2006	Marília		
2007	Brasilis		
2007–2011	Khazar Lankaran	53	(6)
2011–2012	Baku	14	(1)
2012	Ferroviária	5	(0)
2012	Marília	6	(0)
2013	Votuporanguense	7	(0)
2013	Araxá	3	(0)
2014	Votuporanguense	4	(0)
2015	Comercial	17	(3)
2015–2016	Kapaz	33	(6)
2017–2018	ReinMeer Aomori		
- * Club domestic league appearances and goals as of 19 February 2017

Juninho (little Júnior) full name Osvaldo José Martins Júnior (born 7 July 1982) is a Brazilian footballer who currently plays for Japan Football League side ReinMeer Aomori FC.

== Career ==
He also played for Marília.

He signed a 3-month contract in June 2007 for Brasilis.

In July 2015, Juninho went on trial with Azerbaijan Premier League side Kapaz PFK. Juninho leaving the club in May 2016, after the expiration of his contract.

== Club statistics ==
Club performance			League		Cup		League Cup		Continental		Total	
Season	Club	League	Apps	Goals	Apps	Goals	Apps	Goals	Apps	Goals	Apps	Goals
2002	Shimizu S-Pulse	J1 League	0	0	0	0	0	0	0	0	0	0
2003	Ventforet Kofu	J2 League	4	0	0	0	-		0	0	4	0
2003	Sagan Tosu	J2 League	19	1	1	0	-		0	0	20	1
2007–08	Khazar Lankaran	Azerbaijan Premier League	11	3	12	3	-		2	1	13	7
2008–09	Khazar Lankaran	Azerbaijan Premier League	21	1	12	1	-		1	0	22	2
2009–10	Khazar Lankaran	Azerbaijan Premier League	21	2	12	0	-		-		21	2
2010–11	FK Baku	Azerbaijan Premier League	14	1	0	0	-		0	0	14	1
2015–16	Kapaz	Azerbaijan Premier League	33	6	1	0	-		-		34	6
Total	Japan		23	1	1	0	0	0	0	0	24	1
Total	Azerbaijan		79	11	13	4	—		3	1	82	12
Career total			102	12	14	4	0	0	3	1	119	17
