= Yevlakh City Stadium =

Sports venue in Yevlakh, Azerbaijan

Coordinates: 40.6029°N 47.1613°E

- Interactive map of Yevlakh City Stadium
- Location: Yevlakh, Azerbaijan
- Capacity: 5,000

Tenant
- FK Karvan

Yevlakh City Stadium is a multi-purpose stadium in Yevlakh, Azerbaijan. It is currently used mostly for football matches. It serves as the home ground of FK Karvan. In 2007, President of Azerbaijan Ilham Aliyev officially inaugurated the stadium of the FC Karvan in Yevlakh. The stadium holds 7,000 people.

== See also ==
- List of football stadiums in Azerbaijan
