= 2007–08 Azerbaijan Cup =

2007-08 Azerbaijan Cup
Tournament details
- Country: Azerbaijan
- Teams: 16

Final positions
- Champions: Khazar-Lenkoran
- Runners-up: Inter Baku

Tournament statistics
- Matches played: 29
- Goals scored: 76 (2.62 per match)

The Azerbaijan Cup 2007–08 was the 16th season of the annual cup competition in Azerbaijan with the final taking place on 24 May 2008. Sixteen teams competed in this year's competition. Khazar-Lenkoran were the defending champions.

== Round of 16 ==
The first legs were played on October 24 and 31, 2007 while the second legs were played on October 31 and November 7, 2007.

Team 1	Agg.	Team 2	1st leg	2nd leg
Gänclärbirliyi Sumqayit^{1}	1–9	Khazar-Lenkoran	1–4	0–5
Inter Baku II	2–3	FK Baku	0–3	2–0
Simurq	1–3	Qäbälä	0–1	1–2
Olimpik Baku	2–4	ABN Bärdä^{2}	1–1	1–3
FC Absheron	1–3	Neftchi Baku	0–3	1–0
Qarabağ	3–2	Turan Tovuz	2–0	1–2
Inter Baku	4–3	Masallı	2–0	2–3
Karvan	0–4	Standard Sumgayit	0–2	0–2

Notes

- Gänclärbirliyi Sumqayit was excluded from the competition.
- ABN Bärdä was excluded from the competition.

== Quarterfinals ==
The first legs were played on March 6 and 7, 2008 while the second legs were played on March 18 and 19, 2008.

Team 1	Agg.	Team 2	1st leg	2nd leg
Inter Baku	3–2	Qarabağ	2–2	1–0
Qäbälä	2–2(p. 5–4)	FK Baku	1–1	1–1
Khazar-Lenkoran	2–1	Olimpik Baku	0–1	2–0
Standard Sumgayit	1–5	Neftchi Baku	1–4	0–1

== Semifinals ==
The first legs were played on April 9, 2008. The second legs were played on April 23, 2008.

Team 1	Agg.	Team 2	1st leg	2nd leg
Khazar-Lenkoran	4–2	Qäbälä	3–1	1–1
Inter Baku	3–2	Neftchi Baku	2–2	1–0

== Final ==
24 May 2008

Khazar-Lenkoran	2–0 (a.e.t.)	Inter Baku
Juninho 115', 118'

Tofik Bakhramov Stadium, Baku
Attendance: 18,000
