= FK Genclerbirliyi Sumqayit =

FK Gənclərbirliyi Sumqayıt
- Full name: FK Gənclərbirliyi Sumqayıt
- Founded: 2003; 22 years ago
- Dissolved: 2008; 17 years ago
- Ground: Mehdi Huseynzade Stadium, Sumqayit, Azerbaijan
- Capacity: 16,000
- Chairman: Ilgar Nuriyev
- League: Azerbaijan Premier League
- 2007–2008: 13th
Home colours	Away colours

FK Genclerbirliyi Sumqayit (Azerbaijani: FK Gənclərbirliyi Sumqayıt) was an Azerbaijani football club based in Sumqayit. They were founded in 2003 and won the Azerbaijan First Division title the same year, gaining promotion to the Azerbaijan Premier League. They spent four seasons in the top flight, finishing 12th, 11th, 12th and final 13th in their final season. The club was dissolved in July 2008.

They were managed by Afgan Talybov, whilst Ilgar Nuriyev was the club's chairman.

== Stadium ==
Genclerbirliyi Sumqayit played their home matches at the Mehdi Huseynzade Stadium.

== Crest and colours ==
Genclerbirliyi Sumqayit's home kit consisted of a white shirt with black shorts, whilst their away kit was yellow shirts with black shorts.

== League and domestic cup history ==
Season	League									Azerbaijan Cup	Top goalscorer		Manager
Season	Div.	Pos.	Pl.	W	D	L	GS	GA	P	Azerbaijan Cup	Name	League	Manager
2003–04	2nd	1	14	12	2	0	58	7	38	Round of 16			
2004–05	1st	12	34	9	6	19	32	28	33	Quarterfinals	(Burkina Faso) Issa Nikiema	16	(Algeria) Amrouche
2005–06	1st	11	26	6	9	11	25	37	27	Round of 16	(Guinea) Pathé Bangoura	12	
2006–07	1st	12	24	3	3	18	16	54	12	Quarterfinals	(Burkina Faso) Issa Nikiema	4	(Moldova) Ilie Karp
2007–08	1st	13	26	4	2	20	21	68	14	Round of 16^{1}	(Azerbaijan) Səbuhi Sadiqov (Bosnia and Herzegovina) Tomislav Stanić (Azerbaijan) Ismayil Mammadov	3	(Azerbaijan) A.Talybov

Notes

- Gänclärbirliyi Sumqayit were excluded from the competition.

== Honours ==
- Azerbaijan First Division
  - Champions (1): 2003–04
