= Khazar Lankaran FK =

Football club in Azerbaijan (2004–2016)

Khazar Lankaran
- Full name: Xəzər Lənkəran Futbol Klubu
- Nicknames: Gəmiçilər (The Shipbuilders); Dəniz piyadaları (The Marines); Ağ-yaşıllar (The Green-whites)
- Founded: 20 April 2004; 22 years ago
- Dissolved: 2016
- Ground: Lankaran City Stadium, Lankaran, Azerbaijan
- Capacity: 15,500
- Owner: Armin Rezanezhad
- League: Azerbaijan Premier League
- 2015–16: 10th (relegated)
Home colours	Away colours

Khazar Lankaran FK (Azerbaijani: Xəzər Lənkəran Futbol Klubu) was an Azerbaijani football club based in Lankaran that last played in the Azerbaijan Premier League during the 2015–16 season.

Since the summer of 2016 the club has concentrated on youth football. It played in the Azerbaijan Premier League for twelve-seasons, winning the title once, and the Azerbaijan Cup three times. Khazar were also a member of the European Club Association, an organization that replaced the previous G-14 which consists of major football clubs in Europe.

== History ==
=== Early years (2004–2012) ===
The club was founded in 2004 by Azerbaijani entrepreneur Mubariz Mansimov and dubbed by the local media as "Caucasian Chelsea" because of its strong financial position. Under Agaselim Mirjavadov, the club won the Premier League title during the 2006–07 season and the Azerbaijan Cup twice. Khazar also won the CIS Cup in 2008, defeating Pakhtakor Tashkent in the final.

After Fabian Veldwijk's appointment in 2012, a string of Romanian players and footballers were signed from Liga I, but the club did not find success in European cup competition. After winning the Cup in 2013, Khazar announced and decided On 4 December 2013, that Veldwijk had been sacked by the club due to a run of poor performances.

=== Recent years (2014–2016) ===
In July 2014, the club under Yunis Huseynov earned their first win in European competition by beating Nõmme Kalju. In March 2015, former Liverpool striker John Toshack was appointed as new manager after signing two-year deal with the club. In the 2015–16 season, Khazar finished in 12th place, the club's lowest finishing position to date. Khazar Lankaran once again featured in European competitions during the 2015–16 season, featuring in the UEFA Europa League, where they were knocked out 3–0 on aggregate after suffering their heaviest European defeat ever, losing 8–0 to Maccabi Haifa.

Following the Professional Football League of Azerbaijan's decision to deny Khazar a licence for the 2016–17 season, the club announced their withdrawal from professional football.

== League and cup history ==
Season	League									Azerbaijan Cup	Top goalscorer	
Season	Div.	Pos.	Pl.	W	D	L	GS	GA	P	Azerbaijan Cup	Name	League
2004–05	1st	2	34	24	6	4	68	15	78	Semi-finals	(Azerbaijan) Samir Aliyev	20
2005–06	1st	7	26	9	9	8	27	18	36	Semi-finals	(Azerbaijan) Samir Aliyev	4
2006–07	1st	1	24	17	5	2	50	16	56	Winners	(Azerbaijan) Zaur Ramazanov	20
2007–08	1st	4	26	14	10	2	44	16	52	Winners	(Azerbaijan) Zaur Ramazanov	11
2008–09	1st	4	26	15	5	6	49	21	50	Quarter-finals	(Bulgaria) Ivan Tsvetkov	15
2009–10	1st	4	42	18	17	7	48	25	71	Runners-up	(Brazil) Mario Sergio	9
2010–11	1st	2	32	16	12	4	38	18	60	Winners	(Costa Rica) Winston Parks	8
2011–12	1st	2	32	17	8	7	44	28	59	Quarter-finals	(Azerbaijan) Branimir Subašić	6
2012–13	1st	8	32	10	10	12	40	37	40	Runners-up	(Greece) Dimitris Sialmas	6
2013–14	1st	6	36	12	13	11	44	49	49	Semi-finals	(Cameroon) Mbilla Etame	11
2014–15	1st	7	32	8	8	16	35	46	32	Quarter-finals	(Bulgaria) Galin Ivanov	6
2015–16	1st	10	36	3	6	27	16	51	15	Quarter-finals	(Azerbaijan) Rahid Amirguliyev	4

== European history ==
As of 17 July 2013

Season	Competition	Round	Club	Home	Away	Aggregate
2005–06	UEFA Cup	1Q	(Moldova) FC Nistru Otaci	1–2	1–3	2–5
2007–08	UEFA Champions League	1Q	(Croatia) NK Dinamo Zagreb	1–1	1–3 (aet)	2–4
2008–09	UEFA Cup	1Q	(Poland) Lech Poznań	0–1	1–4	1–5
2010–11	UEFA Europa League	1Q	(Moldova) Olimpia	1–1	0–0	1–1 (a)
2011–12	UEFA Europa League	2Q	(Israel) Maccabi Tel Aviv	0–0	1–3	1–3
2012–13	UEFA Europa League	1Q	(Estonia) Nõmme Kalju	2–2	2–0	4–2
2012–13	UEFA Europa League	2Q	(Poland) Lech Poznań	1–1	0–1	1–2
2013–14	UEFA Europa League	1Q	(Malta) Sliema Wanderers	1–0	1–1	2–1
2013–14	UEFA Europa League	2Q	(Israel) Maccabi Haifa	0–8	0–2	0–10

== Crest and colours ==
The club's crest includes stockless anchor with a football ball. The badge shaped like traditional compass with white-green background elements.

== Shirt sponsors and kit manufacturers ==
Khazar's traditional kit is composed of white shirts, green shorts and white socks. The club's kits are manufactured by Puma and sponsored by Palmali, a multinational shipping company in Istanbul.

== Stadium ==
Lankaran City Stadium
- Fırtınalar Meydanı (Arena of Storms)
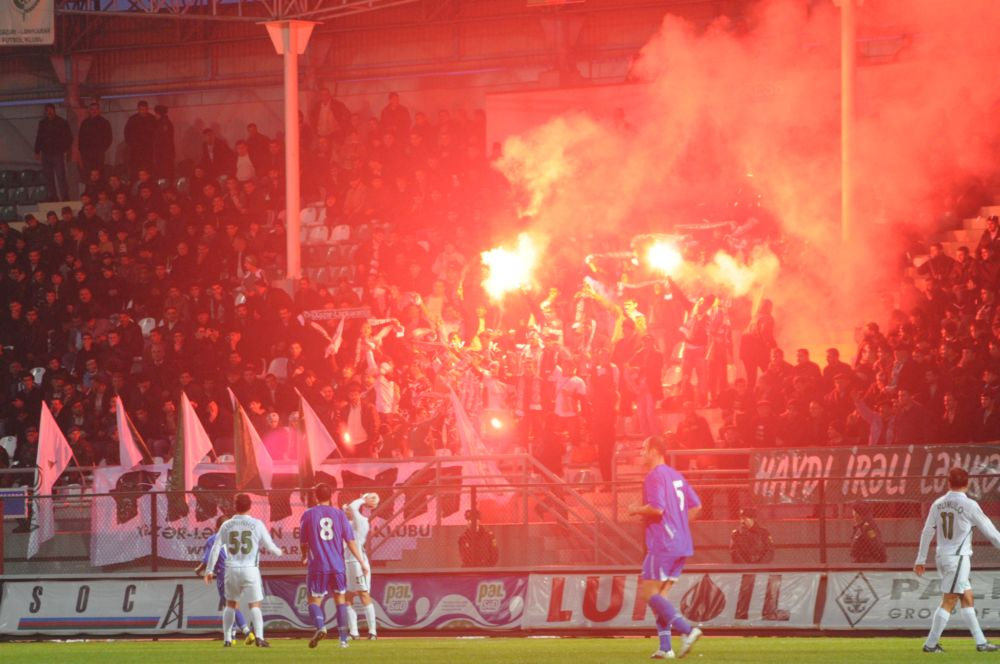
- Location: Lankaran, Azerbaijan
- Owner: Khazar Lankaran
- Operator: Khazar Lankaran
- Capacity: 15,000 seated

Construction
- Groundbreaking: 2005
- Opened: 11 August 2006
- Cost: $15 million

Tenant
- Khazar Lankaran (2006–present)

Khazar Lankaran's home ground is Lankaran City Stadium. It has a capacity of 15,000 and is the third largest stadium in Azerbaijan. The stadium also known as Fırtınalar meydanı (Arena of Storms), named after club's local supporters Fırtına fan group.

On 17 July 2009, UEFA approved stadium for the usage during international football matches. The stadium hosted its first senior international match on 5 September 2009, between Azerbaijan and Finland.

== Supporters ==
Khazar is one of the best supported clubs in Azerbaijan, having the highest attendance after FC Kapaz in the Caucasus region. Supporters of Khazar Lankaran are drawn from all over the Southern Region and beyond, with supporters' clubs all across the world. The club's supporters are also known as the Fırtına(Storm) the first established independent fan club in Azernaijan. Fan club's first president Ravan Bashirov also been appointed as vice- president of Khazar Lankaran FC. .

== Rivalry ==
There is often a fierce rivalry between the two strongest teams in the Azerbaijan Premier League, and this is particularly the case in Azerbaijan, where the game between Khazar Lankaran and Neftchi Baku is known as Böyük Oyun (The Great Game).

== Honours ==
=== National ===
- Azerbaijan Premier League
  - Winners (1): 2006–07
- Azerbaijan Cup
  - Winners (3): 2006–07, 2007–08, 2010–11
- Azerbaijan Supercup
  - Winners (1): 2013

=== Regional ===
- CIS Cup
  - Winners (1): 2008

== Individual records ==
Lists of the players with the most caps and top goalscorers for the club, as of 30 August 2014 (players in bold signifies current Khazar player). Zaur Ramazanov is the club's all-time top scorer with 33 goals in 69 games.

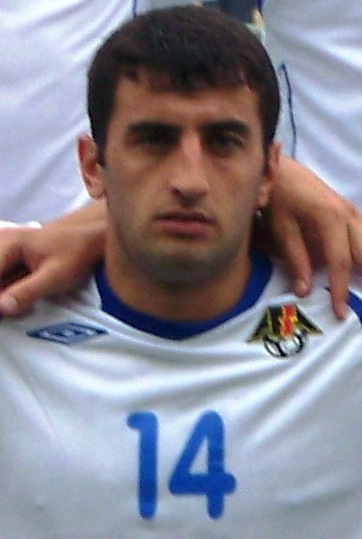
Rahid Amirguliyev is one of the most capped players for the club.

Top Ten Highest Goalscorers
Player		Period	Appearances	Goals
1	(Azerbaijan) Zaur Ramazanov	2005–08; 2011	69	33
2	(Bulgaria) Ivan Tsvetkov	2008–10	50	22
3	(Azerbaijan) Rahid Amirguliyev	2006–present	189	20
4	(Brazil) Mario Sergio	2008–10	58	18
5	(Turkey) Oktay Derelioğlu	2004–05	17	16
6	(Azerbaijan) (Serbia) Branimir Subašić	2011–13	51	14
7	(Azerbaijan) Rashad Abdullayev	2004–09	116	12
8	(Cameroon) Mbilla Etame	2013–14	35	11
9	(Honduras) Allan Lalín	2009–11	43	11
10	(Mali) Sadio Tounkara	2011–present	81	11

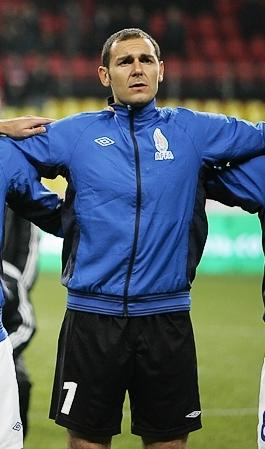
Kamran Agayev is one of the most capped players for the club.

Top Ten Players With Most Appearances
Player		Period	Caps	Goals
1	(Azerbaijan) Rahid Amirguliyev	2006–present	189	20
2	(Bulgaria) Radomir Todorov	2007–10; 2012–13	136	1
3	(Azerbaijan) Kamran Agayev	2006–13	122	0
4	(Azerbaijan) Alim Qurbanov	2004–12	121	11
5	(Azerbaijan) Rashad Abdullayev	2004–09	116	12
6	(Azerbaijan) Elnur Abdullayev	2011–present	109	10
7	(Romania) Adrian Scarlatache	2011; 2012–2015	96	11
8	(Mali) Sadio Tounkara	2011–present	81	11
9	(Romania) Adrian Piț	2011–14	75	8
10	(Azerbaijan) Emin Quliyev	2005–09	70	10

== Notable managers ==
The following managers have all won at least one trophy when in charge of FK Khazar Lankaran:

Name	Period	Trophies
(Azerbaijan) Agaselim Mirjavadov	2007–09	Azerbaijan Premier League, Azerbaijan Cup (2), CIS Cup
(Romania) Mircea Rednic	2010–11	Azerbaijan Cup
(Netherlands) Fabian Veldwijk	2013	Azerbaijan Supercup

== In popular culture ==
A number of television programmes have included references to Khazar Lankaran over the past few decades. In the sitcom Aramizda Galsin, the character Jasarat is a Khazar supporter. Khazar have also featured on several occasions in meykhana.
