= 2006–07 FK Baku season =

Baku
2006-07 season
- President: Hafiz Mammadov
- Manager: Boyukagha Hajiyev
- Stadium: Tofig Bakhramov Stadium
- Premier League: 3rd
- Azerbaijan Cup: Quarterfinals vs Khazar Lankaran
- Champions League: 1st Qualifying Round vs Sioni Bolnisi
- Top goalscorer: League: Fernando Néstor Pérez; Leandro Gomes (6); All: Leandro Gomes (10)
Home colours	Away colours	Third colours

The FK Baku 2006-07 season was Baku's ninth Azerbaijan Premier League season, it was their first, and only, season with Boyukagha Hajiyev as their manager. They finished the season in 3rd place.

== Squad ==
Note: Flags indicate national team as defined under FIFA eligibility rules; some limited exceptions apply. Players may hold more than one non-FIFA nationality.

No.	Pos.	Nation	Player
2	DF	AZE	Andrezinho
3	DF	AZE	Rafael Amirbekov
6	MF	AZE	Elnur Abdullayev
7	DF	AZE	Ramin Guliv
8	DF	AZE	Vugar Guliev
11	MF	AZE	Tarlan Khalilov
12	FW	ARG	Fernando Néstor Pérez
14	MF	GEO	Aleksandr Gogoberishvili
16	FW	AZE	Farid Guliev
17	MF	AZE	Ramazan Abbasov

No.	Pos.	Nation	Player
18	DF	AZE	Asif Abbasov
21	DF	AZE	Rail Malikov
23	GK	SEN	Kalidou Cissokho
25	GK	AZE	Orkhan Mirzaev
55	FW	AZE	Leandro Gomes
77	FW	AZE	Emin Amiraslanov
—	GK	AZE	Amil Agajanov
—	MF	GEO	Amiran Mujiri
—	MF	AZE	Elvin Nuriyev
—	FW	AZE	Samir Musayev

== Transfers ==
=== Summer ===
In: Note: Flags indicate national team as defined under FIFA eligibility rules; some limited exceptions apply. Players may hold more than one non-FIFA nationality.

No.	Pos.	Nation	Player
1	GK	GUI	Saliou Diallo (from (Azerbaijan) Gänclärbirliyi Sumqayit)
8	DF	AZE	Vugar Guliev
11	MF	AZE	Tarlan Khalilov (from (Azerbaijan) Gänclärbirliyi Sumqayit)
19	DF	SRB	Darko Jovandić (from (Serbia) Budućnost Banatski Dvor)
20	DF	ROU	Cristian Ionescu (from (Romania) Petrolul Ploiești)
77	FW	AZE	Emin Amiraslanov (from (Azerbaijan) Gänclärbirliyi Sumqayit)
—	MF	AZE	Ramal Huseynov (from (Azerbaijan) Qarabağ)

Out: Note: Flags indicate national team as defined under FIFA eligibility rules; some limited exceptions apply. Players may hold more than one non-FIFA nationality.

No.	Pos.	Nation	Player
1	GK	AZE	Rauf Mehdiyev (to (Azerbaijan) Olimpik Baku)
9	FW	AZE	Vadim Vasilyev (to (Azerbaijan) Olimpik Baku)
11	MF	LVA	Andrejs Štolcers (to (Latvia) Skonto)
19	MF	AZE	Emin Imamaliev (to (Azerbaijan) Inter Baku)
12	FW	ARG	Fernando Néstor Pérez (to (Argentina) Barracas Central)
20	MF	ROU	Marius Suleap (to (Azerbaijan) Inter Baku)
22	MF	AZE	Ilyas Gurbanov (to (Azerbaijan) MKT-Araz)
77	MF	AZE	Yashar Abuzerov (to (Azerbaijan) Olimpik Baku)
—	MF	AZE	Ruslan Musayev (to (Azerbaijan) Olimpik Baku)
—	MF	GEO	Aleksandre Rekhviashvili (Retired)
—	FW	UKR	Stanislav Loban (to (Ukraine) Naftovyk-Ukrnafta Okhtyrka)

=== Winter ===
In: Note: Flags indicate national team as defined under FIFA eligibility rules; some limited exceptions apply. Players may hold more than one non-FIFA nationality.

No.	Pos.	Nation	Player
—	GK	AZE	Amil Agajanov (from (Azerbaijan) Turan Tovuz)
—	MF	GEO	Amiran Mujiri (from (Georgia (country)) Dinamo Batumi)
—	FW	AZE	Elvin Nuriyev (from (Azerbaijan) Inter Baku)
—	FW	AZE	Samir Musayev (from (Azerbaijan) Qarabağ)
—	FW	ARG	Fernando Néstor Pérez (from (Argentina) Barracas Central)

Out: Note: Flags indicate national team as defined under FIFA eligibility rules; some limited exceptions apply. Players may hold more than one non-FIFA nationality.

No.	Pos.	Nation	Player
1	GK	SEN	Saliou Diallo (to (Azerbaijan) Gänclärbirliyi Sumqayit)
9	FW	GEO	Giorgi Megreladze (to (Kazakhstan) Zhetysu)
10	MF	AZE	Jeyhun Sultanov (to (Azerbaijan) Khazar Lankaran)
19	DF	SRB	Darko Jovandić (from (Serbia) Banat Zrenjanin)
20	DF	ROU	Cristian Ionescu (to (Romania) Brașov)
22	FW	GUI	Pathé Bangoura (to (Azerbaijan) Olimpik Baku)
—	MF	AZE	Ramal Huseynov (loan to (Azerbaijan) Neftchi Baku)

== Competitions ==
=== Azerbaijan Premier League ===
==== Results ====
5 August 2006 1	Baku	1 – 0	Olimpik Baku	Baku
	Andrezinho 70'	[ Summary]		Stadium: Tofig Bakhramov Stadium

10 August 2006 2	Turan Tovuz	0 – 1	Baku	Tovuz
		[ Summary]	Gomes 41'	Stadium: Tovuz City Stadium

21 August 2006 3	Baku	3 – 0	Gänclärbirliyi Sumqayit	Baku
	Gomes 34', 50'; Sultanov 83'	[ Summary]		Stadium: Tofig Bakhramov Stadium

26 August 2006 4	Khazar Lankaran	1 – 0	Baku	Lankaran
	Quliyev 45'	[ Summary]		Stadium: Lankaran City Stadium

17 September 2006 5	Baku	2 – 0	Inter Baku	Baku
	Gomes 62'; Amirbekov 76'	[ Summary]		Stadium: Tofig Bakhramov Stadium; Attendance: 200

23 September 2006 6	MKT-Araz	2 – 0	Baku	Imishli
	Aghakishiyev 18'; Doroș 78'	[ Summary]		Stadium: Heydar Aliyev Stadium; Attendance: 3,020

29 September 2006 7	Baku	0 – 0	Qarabağ	Baku
		[ Summary]		Stadium: Tofiq Bahramov Stadium; Attendance: 500

28 October 2006 9	Baku	1 – 0	Gabala	Baku
	Gogoberishvili 4'	[ Summary]		Stadium: Tofig Bakhramov Stadium; Attendance: 500

10 November 2006 10	Baku	0 – 1	Neftchi Baku	Baku
		[ Summary]	A.Mammadov 5'	Stadium: Tofik Bakhramov Stadium; Attendance: 7,000

15 November 2006 8	Şahdağ	0 – 0	Baku	Qusar
		[ Summary]		Stadium: Şövkət Orduxanov Stadium

26 November 2006 11	Simurq	0 – 0	Baku	Zaqatala
		[ Summary]		Stadium: Zaqatala City Stadium; Attendance: 400

8 December 2006 12	Baku	2 – 0	Karvan	Baku
	Andrezinho 43'; E.Abbasov 58' (o.g.)	[ Summary]		Stadium: Tofik Bakhramov Stadium; Attendance: 500

11 February 2007 13	Olimpik Baku	0 – 0	Baku	Baku
		[ Summary]		Stadium: Shafa Stadium; Attendance: 700

17 February 2007 14	Baku	2 – 0	Turan Tovuz	Baku
	Gomes 22', 85'	[ Summary]		Stadium: Tofik Bakhramov Stadium; Attendance: 500

22 February 2007 15	Gänclärbirliyi Sumqayit	0 – 1	Baku	Sumgayit
		[ Summary]	Musayev 69'	Stadium: Mehdi Huseynzade Stadium; Attendance: 300

17 March 2007 16	Baku	0 – 0	Khazar Lankaran	Baku
		[ Summary]		Stadium: Tofik Bakhramov Stadium; Attendance: 1,500

3 April 2007 19	Qarabağ	1 – 1	Baku	Baku
	Pérez 75' (pen.)	[ Summary]	Beraia 45+1'	Stadium: Tofik Bakhramov Stadium^{2}

8 April 2007 20	Baku	3 – 1	Şahdağ	Baku
	K.Alibabayev 7' (o.g.); Pérez 62', 80'	[ Summary]	S.Sadiqov 59'	Stadium: Tofik Bakhramov Stadium; Attendance: 120

17 April 2007 21	Gabala	0 – 1	Baku	Qabala
		[ Summary]	Quliyev 55'	Stadium: Gabala City Stadium; Attendance: 200

28 April 2007 17	Inter Baku	0 – 1	Baku	Baku
		[ Summary]	Pérez 70'	Stadium: Shafa Stadium; Attendance: 1,200

8 May 2007 22	Neftchi Baku	1 – 0	Baku	Baku
	Aliyev 76'	[ Summary]		Stadium: Tofik Bakhramov Stadium; Attendance: 5,500

13 May 2007 18	Baku	1 – 0	MKT-Araz	Baku
	Pérez 82'	[ Summary]		Stadium: Tofik Bakhramov Stadium; Attendance: 500

18 May 2007 23	Baku	3 – 2	Simurq	Baku
	Abbasov 10'; Pérez; F.Guliev	[ Summary]	Abdurahmanov (.); Nasibov	Stadium: Tofik Bakhramov Stadium

23 May 2007 24	Karvan	1 – 2	Baku	Yevlakh
	Maharramov 88'	[ Summary]	Khalilov 34'; Guliev 71'	Stadium: Yevlakh City Stadium; Attendance: 200

==== Table ====
Pos	Team	Pld	W	D	L	GF	GA	GD	Pts	Qualification or relegation
1	Khazar Lankaran (C)	24	17	5	2	50	16	+34	56	Qualification for Champions League first qualifying round
2	Neftçi Baku	24	17	3	4	47	15	+32	54	Qualification for UEFA Cup first qualifying round (Note: MKT-Araz qualified for the first qualifying round of the 2005–06 UEFA Cup as winner of the 2004–05 Azerbaijan Cup.)
3	Baku	24	14	6	4	25	10	+15	48	Qualification for Intertoto Cup first round
4	Inter Baku	24	13	6	5	36	12	+24	45	
5	FK MKT-Araz	24	12	5	7	23	18	+5	41	Qualification for UEFA Cup first qualifying round

Source: Azerbaijan Professional Football league
(C) Champions

=== Azerbaijan Cup ===
11 September 2006 Round of 32 1st Leg	Rote Fahne	2 – 4	Baku	Tovuz
	Y.Abbasov 62', 68'	[ Summary]	Gomes 4', 6'; Abbasov 44'; F.Guliyev 90+2'

16 October 2006 Round of 32 2nd Leg	Baku	9 – 1 (13 – 3 agg.)	Rote Fahne	Baku
		[ Summary]		Stadium: Tofig Bakhramov Stadium

21 November 2006 Round of 16 1st Leg	Gabala	0 – 2	Baku	Qabala
		[ Summary]	Megreladze 78'; Gomes 90+2'	Stadium: Gabala City Stadium; Attendance: 400

2 December 2006 Round of 16 2nd Leg	Baku	1 – 0 (3 – 0 agg.)	Gabala	Baku
	Gomes 51'	[ Summary]		Stadium: Tofig Bakhramov Stadium; Attendance: 100

26 February 2007 Quarterfinals 1st Leg	Baku	0 – 2	Khazar Lankaran	Baku
		[ Summary]	Amirguliyev 57'; F.Mammedov 90'	Stadium: Tofig Bakhramov Stadium

4 March 2007 Quarterfinals 2nd Leg	Khazar Lankaran	0 – 1 (2 – 1 agg.)	Baku	Lankaran
		[ Summary]	Pérez 64'	Stadium: Lankaran City Stadium; Attendance: 8,500

=== UEFA Champions League ===
==== First qualifying round ====
11 July 2006 1st Leg	Sioni Bolnisi (Georgia (country))	2 – 0	(Azerbaijan) Baku	Tbilisi
AZST (UTC+5)	Boyomo 69'; Ugrekhelidze 88'	Report		Stadium: Mikheil Meskhi Stadium; Referee: Thorsten Kinhöfer (Germany)

18 July 2006 2nd Leg	Baku (Azerbaijan)	1 – 0 (1 – 2 agg.)	(Georgia (country)) Sioni Bolnisi	Baku
AZST (UTC+5)	F. Guliev 63'	Report		Stadium: Tofiq Bahramov Stadium; Referee: Sergiy Berezka (Ukraine)

== Squad statistics ==
=== Appearances and goals ===
No.	Pos	Nat	Player	Total		Premier League		Azerbaijan Cup		Champions League	
No.	Pos	Nat	Player	Apps	Goals	Apps	Goals	Apps	Goals	Apps	Goals
2	DF	(Azerbaijan) AZE	Andrezinho	21	2	19	2	0	0	2	0
3	DF	(Azerbaijan) AZE	Rafael Amirbekov	17	1	15	1	0	0	2	0
6	MF	(Azerbaijan) AZE	Elnur Abdullaev	22	0	21	0	0	0	1	0
7	DF	(Azerbaijan) AZE	Ramin Guliv	23	0	21	0	0	0	2	0
8	DF	(Azerbaijan) AZE	Vugar Guliev	17	1	16	1	0	0	1	0
11	MF	(Azerbaijan) AZE	Tarlan Khalilov	5	1	5	1	0	0	0	0
12	FW	(Argentina) ARG	Fernando Néstor Pérez	9	6	9	6	0	0	0	0
14	MF	(Georgia (country)) GEO	Aleksandr Gogoberishvili	18	1	18	1	0	0	0	0
16	FW	(Azerbaijan) AZE	Farid Guliev	14	3	13	2	0	0	1	1
17	MF	(Azerbaijan) AZE	Ramazan Abbasov	25	1	24	1	0	0	1	0
18	DF	(Azerbaijan) AZE	Asif Abbasov	15	0	13	0	0	0	2	0
21	DF	(Azerbaijan) AZE	Rail Malikov	24	0	23	0	0	0	1	0
23	GK	(Senegal) SEN	Kalidou Cissokho	21	0	21	0	0	0	0	0
25	GK	(Azerbaijan) AZE	Orkhan Mirzaev	4	0	4	0	0	0	0	0
55	FW	(Azerbaijan) AZE	Leandro Gomes	18	6	18	6	0	0	0	0
77	FW	(Azerbaijan) AZE	Emin Amiraslanov	10	0	10	0	0	0	0	0
	GK	(Azerbaijan) AZE	Amil Agajanov	1	0	1	0	0	0	0	0
	MF	(Georgia (country)) GEO	Amiran Mujiri	10	0	10	0	0	0	0	0
	MF	(Azerbaijan) AZE	Elvin Nuriyev	4	0	4	0	0	0	0	0
	FW	(Azerbaijan) AZE	Samir Musayev	8	1	8	1	0	0	0	0
Players away from Baku on loan:
	MF	(Azerbaijan) AZE	Ramal Huseynov	10	0	10	0	0	0	0	0
Players who appeared for Baku that left during the season:
1	GK	(Senegal) SEN	Saliou Diallo	2	0	0	0	0	0	2	0
9	FW	(Georgia (country)) GEO	Giorgi Megreladze	8	0	6	0	0	0	2	0
10	MF	(Azerbaijan) AZE	Jeyhun Sultanov	12	1	10	1	0	0	2	0
19	MF	(Serbia) SRB	Darko Jovandić	10	0	8	0	0	0	2	0
20	MF	(Romania) ROU	Cristian Ionescu	11	0	9	0	0	0	2	0
22	FW	(Guinea) GUI	Pathé Bangoura	7	0	5	0	0	0	2	0

=== Goal scorers ===
Place	Position	Nation	Number	Name	Premier League	Azerbaijan Cup	Champions League	Total
1	FW	(Azerbaijan)	55	Leandro Gomes	6	4	0	10
2	FW	(Argentina)	12	Fernando Néstor Pérez	6	1	0	7
3	FW	(Azerbaijan)	16	Farid Guliev	2	1	1	4
4	DF	(Azerbaijan)	2	Andrezinho	2	0	0	2
4				Own goal	2	0	0	2
4	MF	(Azerbaijan)	17	Ramazan Abbasov	1	1	0	2
7	MF	(Georgia (country))	14	Aleksandr Gogoberishvili	1	0	0	1
7	DF	(Azerbaijan)	8	Vugar Guliev	1	0	0	1
7	DF	(Azerbaijan)	3	Rafael Amirbekov	1	0	0	1
7	MF	(Azerbaijan)	10	Jeyhun Sultanov	1	0	0	1
7	FW	(Azerbaijan)		Samir Musayev	1	0	0	1
7	MF	(Azerbaijan)	11	Tarlan Khalilov	1	0	0	1
7	FW	(Georgia (country))	9	Giorgi Megreladze	0	1	0	1
				Unknown	0	9	0	9
				TOTALS	25	17	1	43
