= 2005–06 FK Baku season =

Baku
2005-06 season
- President: Hafiz Mammadov
- Stadium: Tofig Bakhramov Stadium
- Premier League: 1st
- Azerbaijan Cup: Quarterfinals vs Qarabağ
- UEFA Cup: First qualifying round vs MŠK Žilina
- Top goalscorer: League: Leandro Gomes (8); All: Two players (8)
Home colours	Away colours	Third colours

The FK Baku 2005-06 season was Baku's eighth Azerbaijan Premier League season.

== Squad ==
Note: Flags indicate national team as defined under FIFA eligibility rules; some limited exceptions apply. Players may hold more than one non-FIFA nationality.

No.	Pos.	Nation	Player
1	GK	(Azerbaijan) AZE	Rauf Mehdiyev
2	DF	(Brazil) BRA	Andrezinho
3	DF	(Azerbaijan) AZE	Rafael Amirbekov
7	DF	(Azerbaijan) AZE	Ramin Guliv
9	FW	(Azerbaijan) AZE	Vadim Vasilyev
10	FW	(Azerbaijan) AZE	Jeyhun Sultanov
11	MF	(Latvia) LVA	Andrejs Štolcers
12	FW	(Argentina) ARG	Fernando Néstor Pérez
14	MF	(Georgia (country)) GEO	Aleksandr Gogoberishvili
17	MF	(Azerbaijan) AZE	Ramazan Abbasov
18	DF	(Azerbaijan) AZE	Asif Abbasov
19	MF	(Azerbaijan) AZE	Emin Imamaliev
20	MF	(Romania) ROU	Marius Suleap

No.	Pos.	Nation	Player
21	DF	(Azerbaijan) AZE	Rail Malikov
22	MF	(Azerbaijan) AZE	Ilyas Gurbanov
23	GK	(Senegal) SEN	Kalidou Cissokho
25	GK	(Azerbaijan) AZE	Orkhan Mirzaev
55	FW	(Brazil) BRA	Leandro Gomes
77	MF	(Azerbaijan) AZE	Yashar Abuzerov
—	DF	(Azerbaijan) AZE	Samir Əbdürrəhmanov
—	DF	(Azerbaijan) AZE	Pasha Aliyev
—	MF	(Georgia (country)) GEO	Aleksandre Rekhviashvili
—	MF	(Azerbaijan) AZE	Ruslan Musayev
—	MF	(Azerbaijan) AZE	Elnur Abdullayev
—	FW	(Ukraine) UKR	Stanislav Loban

== Transfers ==
=== Summer ===
In: Note: Flags indicate national team as defined under FIFA eligibility rules; some limited exceptions apply. Players may hold more than one non-FIFA nationality.

No.	Pos.	Nation	Player
8	MF	(Albania) ALB	Suad Liçi (from (Albania) Vllaznia Shkodër)
11	MF	(Latvia) LVA	Andrejs Štolcers (from (England) Yeovil Town)
—	MF	(Georgia (country)) GEO	Aleksandre Rekhviashvili (from (Latvia) Ventspils)

Out: Note: Flags indicate national team as defined under FIFA eligibility rules; some limited exceptions apply. Players may hold more than one non-FIFA nationality.

No.	Pos.	Nation	Player
—	GK	(Azerbaijan) AZE	Elshan Poladov (to (Azerbaijan) Inter Baku)
—	DF	(Azerbaijan) AZE	İlham Əzizov
—	DF	(Azerbaijan) AZE	Dmitri Spirin (to (Azerbaijan) Qarabağ)
—	MF	(Azerbaijan) AZE	Dmitri Yeremeyev (to (Azerbaijan) Qarabağ)
—	MF	(Azerbaijan) AZE	Eldəniz Məmmədov (to (Azerbaijan) Kapaz)
—	MF	(Azerbaijan) AZE	Ramin Nəsibov
—	MF	(Brazil) BRA	Flatimir Freytas da Kruz
—	MF	(Brazil) BRA	Roberto Andréo Sergio
—	FW	(Argentina) ARG	Gilyermo Leyvo
—	FW	(Azerbaijan) AZE	Tərlan Mahmudov (to (Azerbaijan) Qarabağ)
—	FW	(Azerbaijan) AZE	Farid Guliyev (to (Azerbaijan) Qarabağ)
—	FW	(Brazil) BRA	Renatinho
—	FW	(Brazil) BRA	Kristiano Dos Santos
—	FW	(Brazil) BRA	Carlos Ribero
—	FW	(Georgia (country)) GEO	Merab Dzodzuaşvili
—	FW	(Serbia and Montenegro) SCG	Miodrag Zec (to (Russia) Baltika Kaliningrad)

=== Winter ===
In: Note: Flags indicate national team as defined under FIFA eligibility rules; some limited exceptions apply. Players may hold more than one non-FIFA nationality.

No.	Pos.	Nation	Player
—	MF	(Azerbaijan) AZE	Ruslan Musayev (from (Azerbaijan) Qarabağ)
—	FW	(Ukraine) UKR	Stanislav Loban (from (Ukraine) Podillya Khmelnytskyi)

Out: Note: Flags indicate national team as defined under FIFA eligibility rules; some limited exceptions apply. Players may hold more than one non-FIFA nationality.

No.	Pos.	Nation	Player
8	MF	(Albania) ALB	Suad Liçi (to (Albania) Vllaznia Shkodër)

== Competitions ==
=== Azerbaijan Premier League ===
==== Results ====
12 August 2005 1	Baku	1 – 0	Karvan	Baku
	Vasilyev 84'	[ Summary]		Stadium: Tofig Bakhramov Stadium; Attendance: 600

22 August 2005 2	Khazar Lankaran	0 – 1	Baku	Lankaran
		[ Summary]	Imamaliev 7'	Stadium: Lankaran City Stadium; Attendance: 2,500

28 August 2005 3	Baku	0 – 1	Şahdağ	Baku
		[ Summary]	H.Agayev 47'	Stadium: Tofig Bakhramov Stadium; Attendance: 500

11 September 2005 4	Qarabağ	2 – 4	Baku	Baku
	O.Voskoboinik 25'; Kravchenko 78'	[ Summary]	M.Suleap 43'; Vasilyev 51'; Leandro Gomes 61', 78'	Stadium: Tofik Bakhramov Stadium^{2} Attendance: 1,000

17 September 2005 5	Baku	2 – 0	Göyazan Qazax	Baku
		[ Summary]	Pérez 17', 77'; Gomes 90+1'	Stadium: Tofig Bakhramov Stadium; Attendance: 500

2 October 2005 6	MOIK Baku	0 – 4	Baku	Baku
		[ Summary]	Štolcers 3'; N.Qasimov 28' (o.g.); Leandro Gomes 79'; Y.Abuzerov 89'	Stadium: Shafa Stadium; Attendance: 138

22 October 2005 7	Baku	0 – 0	Kapaz	Baku
		[ Summary]		Stadium: Tofiq Bahramov Stadium; Attendance: 500

30 October 2005 8	MKT-Araz	2 – 1	Baku	Sumqayit
	Baldovaliev 63'; Muteba 90+1'	[ Summary]	Štolcers 82'	Stadium: Mehdi Huseynzade Stadium; Attendance: 250

13 November 2005 9	Baku	2 – 0	Gänclärbirliyi Sumqayit	Baku
	Štolcers 38'; Pérez 86'	[ Summary]		Stadium: Tofig Bakhramov Stadium; Attendance: 300

26 November 2005 10	Turan Tovuz	1 – 0	Baku	Tovuz
	Junivan 62'	[ Summary]		Stadium: Tovuz City Stadium; Attendance: 1,000

3 December 2005 11	Baku	2 – 2	Neftchi Baku	Baku
	Štolcers 28' (pen.); Abuzerov 47'	[ Summary]	Nabiyev 38'; Mišura 87' (pen.)	Stadium: Tofig Bakhramov Stadium; Attendance: 2,000

10 December 2005 12	Olimpik Baku	0 – 1	Baku	Baku
		[ Summary]	Pérez 45'	Stadium: Shafa Stadium

17 December 2005 13	Baku	–	Inter Baku	Baku
	Gogoberishvili 19'	[ Summary]		Stadium: Tofig Bakhramov Stadium

12 February 2006 14	Karvan	1 – 0	Baku	Yevlakh
	Bamba 39'	[ Summary]		Stadium: Yevlakh City Stadium; Attendance: 500

17 February 2006 15	Baku	1 – 1	Khazar Lankaran	Baku
	Leandro Gomes 90+1'	[ Summary]	Ilyés 14'	Stadium: Tofig Bakhramov Stadium; Attendance: 1,000

22 February 2006 16	Shahdag Qusar	0 – 3	Baku	Qusar
		[ Summary]	Vasilyev 14' (pen.); Sultanov 45+1'; Pérez 74'	Stadium: Shovkat Ordukhanov Stadium; Attendance: 1,000

12 March 2006 17	Baku	2 – 1	Qarabağ	Baku
	Sultanov 19'; Loban 89'	[ Summary]	Guliyev 3'	Stadium: Tofig Bakhramov Stadium; Attendance: 500

25 March 2006 18	Göyazan Qazax	1 – 1	Baku	Qazax
	K.Välädov 50'	[ Summary]	Vasilyev 88'	Stadium: Qazakh City Stadium; Attendance: 500

30 March 2006 19	Baku	3 – 0	MOIK Baku	Baku
	Gogoberishvili 13'; Pérez 58'; Leandro Gomes 60'	[ Summary]		Stadium: Tofig Bakhramov Stadium; Attendance: 200

6 April 2006 20	Kapaz	0 – 2	Baku	Baku
		[ Summary]	Leandro Gomes 84'; Vasilyev 90'	Attendance: 50

17 April 2006 21	Baku	3 – 0	MKT-Araz	Imishli
	Imamaliev 24'; Vasilyev 42'; Gogoberishvili 90+1'	[ Summary]		Stadium: Heydar Aliyev Stadium; Attendance: 300

21 April 2006 22	Gänclärbirliyi Sumqayit	0 – 2	Baku	Sumqayit
		[ Summary]	Sultanov 4', 73'	Stadium: Mehdi Huseynzade Stadium; Attendance: 155

29 April 2006 23	Baku	1 – 0	Turan Tovuz	Baku
	Abbasov 7'	[ Summary]		Stadium: Tofig Bakhramov Stadium; Attendance: 200

7 May 2006 24	Neftchi Baku	0 – 1	Baku	Baku
		[ Summary]	Leandro Gomes 84'	Stadium: Tofig Bakhramov Stadium; Attendance: 3,500

14 May 2006 25	Baku	2 – 0	Olimpik Baku	Baku
	Sultanov 60'; Vasilyev 87'	[ Summary]		Stadium: Tofig Bakhramov Stadium; Attendance: 300

29 May 2006 26	Inter Baku	0 – 1	Baku	Baku
		[ Summary]	Imamaliev 27'	Stadium: Shafa Stadium; Attendance: 3,000

==== Table ====
Pos	Team	Pld	W	D	L	GF	GA	GD	Pts	Qualification or relegation
1	Baku (C)	26	18	4	4	42	12	+30	58	Qualification for Champions League first qualifying round
2	Karvan	26	17	6	3	50	9	+41	57	Qualification for UEFA Cup first qualifying round (Note: Qarabağ qualified for the first qualifying round of the 2006–07 UEFA Cup as winner of the 2005–06 Azerbaijan Cup.)
3	Neftçi Baku	26	15	9	2	51	16	+35	54	
4	Inter Baku	26	14	8	4	35	14	+21	50	
5	Qarabağ	26	12	4	10	32	32	0	40	Qualification for UEFA Cup first qualifying round

Source: Azerbaijan Professional Football league
Rules for classification: 1) points; 2) goal difference; 3) number of goals scored.
(C) Champions

=== Azerbaijan Cup ===
4 November 2005 Round of 16 1st Leg	Olimpik Baku	0 – 0	Baku	Qabala
		[ Summary]		Stadium: Gabala City Stadium; Attendance: 1,000

19 November 2005 Round of 16 2nd Leg	Baku	3 – 0 (3 – 0 agg.)	Olimpik Baku	Baku
	Štolcers 10'; Andrezinho 18' (pen.); Gogoberishvili 27'	[ Summary]		Stadium: Tofig Bakhramov Stadium; Attendance: 200

4 March 2006 Quarterfinals 1st Leg	Qarabağ	3 – 2	Baku	Baku
	Juška 30'; Musayev 56' (pen.), 68'	[ Summary]	Pérez 45'; Vasilyev 89' (pen.)	Stadium: Tofig Bakhramov Stadium

18 March 2006 Quarterfinals 2nd Leg	Baku	0 – 0 (2 – 3 agg.)	Qarabağ	Baku
		[ Summary]		Stadium: Tofig Bakhramov Stadium; Attendance: 1,000

=== UEFA Cup ===
==== First qualifying round ====
14 July 2005 1st Leg	Baku (Azerbaijan)	1 – 0	(Slovakia) MŠK Žilina	Baku
23:30 AZST (UTC+5)	Sultanov 78'	Report		Stadium: Tofik Bakhramov Stadium; Referee: Metin Aydogan (Turkey)

29 July 2005 2nd Leg	MŠK Žilina (Slovakia)	3 – 1 (3 – 2 agg.)	(Azerbaijan) Baku	Žilina
00:00 AZST (UTC+5)	Straka 7'; Čišovský 38'; Šesták (red card) 40'; Jež (red card) 69'; Labant 85'	Report	Cissokho (red card) 40'; Štolcers 68'; Leandro Gomes (red card) 69'	Stadium: Štadión pod Dubňom; Referee: Ioannis Tsachilidis (Greece)

== Squad statistics ==
=== Appearances and goals ===
No.	Pos	Nat	Player	Total		Premier League		Azerbaijan Cup		UEFA Cup	
No.	Pos	Nat	Player	Apps	Goals	Apps	Goals	Apps	Goals	Apps	Goals
1	GK	(Azerbaijan) AZE	Rauf Mehdiyev	9	0	8	0	0	0	0+1	0
2	DF	(Brazil) BRA	Andrezinho	24	0	22	0	0	0	2	0
3	DF	(Azerbaijan) AZE	Rafael Amirbekov	20	0	18	0	0	0	2	0
7	DF	(Azerbaijan) AZE	Ramin Guliv	27	0	25	0	0	0	2	0
9	FW	(Azerbaijan) AZE	Vadim Vasilyev	24	7	22	7	0	0	1+1	0
10	MF	(Azerbaijan) AZE	Jeyhun Sultanov	25	6	24	5	0	0	0+1	1
11	MF	(Latvia) LVA	Andrejs Štolcers	12	5	10	4	0	0	1+1	1
12	FW	(Argentina) ARG	Fernando Néstor Pérez	18	6	18	6	0	0	0	0
14	MF	(Georgia (country)) GEO	Aleksandr Gogoberishvili	28	3	26	3	0	0	2	0
17	MF	(Azerbaijan) AZE	Ramazan Abbasov	12	1	12	1	0	0	0	0
19	MF	(Azerbaijan) AZE	Emin Imamaliev	27	3	25	3	0	0	2	0
20	MF	(Romania) ROU	Marius Suleap	12	1	11	1	0	0	1	0
21	DF	(Azerbaijan) AZE	Rail Malikov	26	0	24	0	0	0	2	0
22	MF	(Azerbaijan) AZE	Ilyas Gurbanov	4	0	2	0	0	0	0+2	0
23	GK	(Senegal) SEN	Kalidou Cissokho	20	0	18	0	0	0	2	0
55	MF	(Brazil) BRA	Leandro Gomes	25	8	23	8	0	0	2	0
77	MF	(Azerbaijan) AZE	Yashar Abuzerov	20	2	19	2	0	0	1	0
	GK	(Azerbaijan) AZE	Orkhan Mirzaev	1	0	1	0	0	0	0	0
	DF	(Azerbaijan) AZE	Asif Abbasov	12	0	12	0	0	0	0	0
	DF	(Azerbaijan) AZE	Samir Əbdürrəhmanov	2	0	2	0	0	0	0	0
	DF	(Azerbaijan) AZE	Pasha Aliyev	3	0	3	0	0	0	0	0
	MF	(Georgia (country)) GEO	Aleksandre Rekhviashvili	8	0	8	0	0	0	0	0
	MF	(Azerbaijan) AZE	Ruslan Musayev	5	0	5	0	0	0	0	0
	MF	(Azerbaijan) AZE	Elnur Abdullayev	4	0	4	0	0	0	0	0
	FW	(Ukraine) UKR	Stanislav Loban	9	1	9	1	0	0	0	0
Players away from Baku on loan:
Players who appeared for Baku that left during the season:
8	MF	(Albania) ALB	Suad Liçi	2	0	0	0	0	0	2	0

=== Goal Scorers ===
Place	Position	Nation	Number	Name	Premier League	Azerbaijan Cup	UEFA Cup	Total
1	MF	(Brazil)	55	Leandro Gomes	8	0	0	8
2	FW	(Azerbaijan)	9	Vadim Vasilyev	7	1	0	8
3	FW	(Argentina)	12	Fernando Nestor Pérez	6	1	0	7
4	MF	(Azerbaijan)	10	Jeyhun Sultanov	5	0	1	6
4	FW	(Latvia)	11	Andrejs Štolcers	4	1	1	6
6	MF	(Georgia (country))	14	Aleksandr Gogoberishvili	3	1	0	4
7	MF	(Azerbaijan)	19	Emin Imamaliev	3	0	0	3
8	MF	(Azerbaijan)	77	Yashar Abuzerov	2	0	0	2
9	MF	(Azerbaijan)	17	Ramazan Abbasov	1	0	0	1
9	MF	(Romania)	20	Marius Suleap	1	0	0	1
9	FW	(Ukraine)		Stanislav Loban	1	0	0	1
9	DF	(Brazil)	2	Andrezinho	0	1	0	1
9				Own goal	1	0	0	1
				TOTALS	42	5	2	47
