= Rauf Mehdiyev =

Azerbaijani footballer (born 1976)

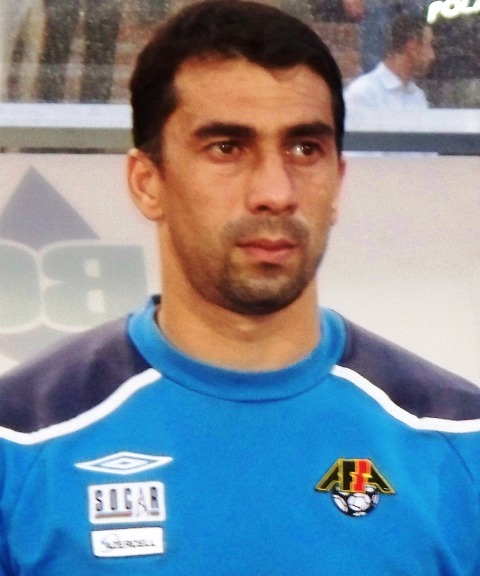

Personal information
- Full name: Rauf Rafiq oğlu Mehdiyev
- Date of birth: 17 October 1976 (age 50)
- Height: 1.81 m (5 ft 11 1/2 in)
- Position: Goalkeeper

Senior career*
Years	Team	Apps	(Gls)
1994–1996	Neftchi Baku	4	(0)
1996	Farid Baku	13	(0)
1997	MOIK Baku	23	(0)
1998–2004	Shamkir	83	(0)
2004–2005	Qarabağ	23	(0)
2005–2006	Baku	8	(0)
2006–2009	Olimpik Baku	65	(0)
2009	Simurq	2	(0)
2010	Karvan	10	(0)
2010–2012	Neftchi Baku	30	(0)

International career^{‡}
2004–2008	Azerbaijan	5	(0)
- * Club domestic league appearances and goals as of 11 December 2013 ‡ National team caps and goals as of 11 December 2013

Rauf Mehdiyev (born 17 October 1976) is a retired Azerbaijani football goalkeeper whose last club was Neftchi Baku.

During his career, Mehdiyev played for nine different Azerbaijani teams and represented Azerbaijan five times.

== Career statistics ==
=== Club ===
As of 11 December 2013

Club performance			League		Cup		Continental		Total	
Season	Club	League	Apps	Goals	Apps	Goals	Apps	Goals	Apps	Goals
Azerbaijan			League		Azerbaijan Cup		Europe		Total	
1994–95	Neftchi Baku	Azerbaijan Premier League	2	0			-		2	0
1995–96	Neftchi Baku	Azerbaijan Premier League	2	0			0	0	2	0
1996–97	Farid Baku	Azerbaijan Premier League	13	0			-		13	0
1996–97	MOIK Baku	Azerbaijan Premier League	11	0			-		11	0
1997–98	MOIK Baku	Azerbaijan Premier League	12	0			-		12	0
1997–98	Shamkir	Azerbaijan Premier League	8	0			-		8	0
1998–99	Shamkir	Azerbaijan Premier League	21	0			-		21	0
1999–2000	Shamkir	Azerbaijan Premier League	21	0			2	0	23	0
2000–01	Shamkir	Azerbaijan Premier League	8	0			4	0	12	0
2001–02	Shamkir	Azerbaijan Premier League	1	0			0	0	1	0
2002–03	Shamkir	Azerbaijan Premier League	no league championship was held.						-	-
2003–04	Shamkir	Azerbaijan Premier League	24	0			-		24	0
2004–05	Qarabağ	Azerbaijan Premier League	23	0			2	0	25	0
2005–06	Baku	Azerbaijan Premier League	8	0			1	0	9	0
2006–07	Olimpik Baku	Azerbaijan Premier League	23	0			-		23	0
2007–08	Olimpik Baku	Azerbaijan Premier League	23	0			-		23	0
2008–09	Olimpik Baku	Azerbaijan Premier League	19	0			2	0	21	0
2009–10	Simurq	Azerbaijan Premier League	0	0			2	0	2	0
2009–10	Karvan	Azerbaijan Premier League	10	0	0	0	-		10	0
2010–11	Neftchi Baku	Azerbaijan Premier League	20	0	3	0	-		23	0
2011–12	Neftchi Baku	Azerbaijan Premier League	10	0	2	0	0	0	12	0
2012–13	Neftchi Baku	Azerbaijan Premier League	0	0	0	0	3	0	3	0
Total	Azerbaijan		259	0	5	0	16	0	279	0
Career total			259	0	5	0	16	0	279	0

=== International ===
Azerbaijan national team
Year	Apps	Goals
2004	1	0
2005	2	0
2008	2	0
Total	5	0
