= Ramazan Abbasov =

Azerbaijani footballer (born 1983)

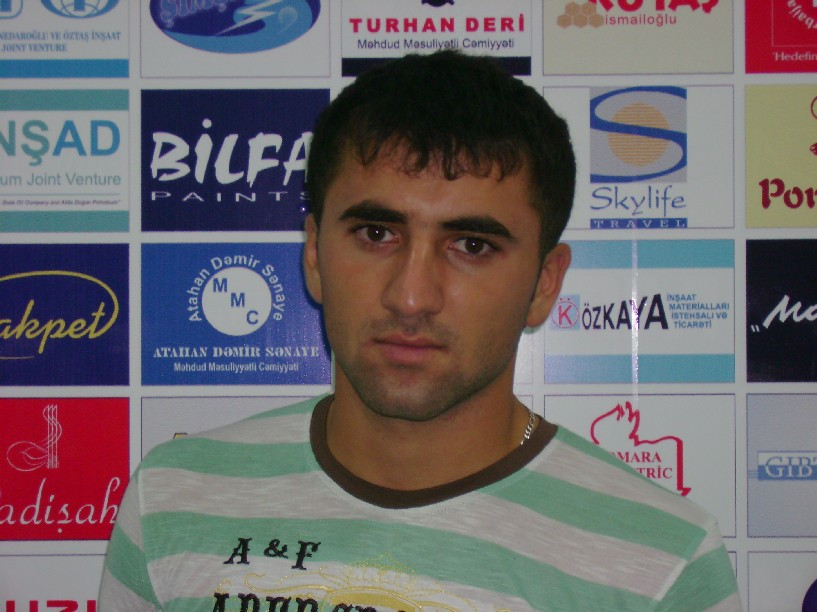

Personal information
- Date of birth: 22 September 1983 (age 43)
- Place of birth: Ganja, Azerbaijani SSR, Soviet Union
- Height: 1.76 m (5 ft 9 in)
- Position: Midfielder

Team information
- Current team: Kür-Araz
- Number: 11

Senior career*
Years	Team	Apps	(Gls)
2004–2005	Baku	34	(4)
2006	MOIK Baku	29	(6)
2006–2007	Baku	36	(2)
2007–2008	Neftchi Baku	12	(0)
2009	Baku	7	(0)
2009–2010	Khazar Lankaran	15	(0)
2010–2011	Kapaz	4	(0)
2011–2012	Ravan Baku	31	(3)
2013	Baku	7	(0)
2013–2014	Ravan Baku	39	(4)
2014	Sumgayit	10	(1)
2015	Baku	16	(0)
2015–2016	Ravan Baku	32	(5)
2016–2017	Səbail	22	(8)
2023–	Kür-Araz	?	(?)

International career
2006–2007	Azerbaijan	9	(0)
- * Club domestic league appearances and goals as of 17:34, 26 March 2025 (UTC)

Ramazan Abbasov (born 22 September 1983 in Ganja) is an Azerbaijani professional footballer who plays as a midfielder for Azerbaijan Second League club Kür-Araz. He earned nine caps for the Azerbaijan national team.

== Career ==
In January 2015, Abbasov went on trial with Azerbaijan Premier League side FK Baku.

== Career statistics ==
=== Club ===
As of 29 May 2015

Club statistics
Season	Club	League	League		Cup		Other		Total	
Season	Club	League	App	Goals	App	Goals	App	Goals	App	Goals
2003–04	Baku	Azerbaijan Premier League	21	3			—		21	3
2004–05	Baku	Azerbaijan Premier League	13	1			—		13	1
2004–05	MOIK Baku	Azerbaijan Premier League	16	1			—		16	1
2005–06	MOIK Baku	Azerbaijan Premier League	13	5			—		13	5
2005–06	Baku	Azerbaijan Premier League	12	1			1	0	13	1
2006–07	Baku	Azerbaijan Premier League	24	1			0	0	24	1
2007–08	Neftchi Baku	Azerbaijan Premier League	12	0			—		12	0
2008–09	Baku	Azerbaijan Premier League	7	0			—		7	0
2009–10	Khazar Lankaran	Azerbaijan Premier League	9	0	2	0	—		11	0
2010–11	Khazar Lankaran	Azerbaijan Premier League	6	0	1	1	0	0	7	1
2010–11	Kapaz	Azerbaijan Premier League	4	0	0	0	—		4	0
2011–12	Ravan Baku	Azerbaijan Premier League	31	3	1	0	—		32	3
2012–13	Baku	Azerbaijan Premier League	7	0	1	0	—		8	0
2012–13	Ravan Baku	Azerbaijan Premier League	14	3	2	0	—		16	3
2013–14	Ravan Baku	Azerbaijan Premier League	23	1	2	0	—		27	1
2014–15	Sumgayit	Azerbaijan Premier League	10	1	1	0	—		11	1
2014–15	Baku	Azerbaijan Premier League	16	0	1	0	—		17	0
Total			240	20	11	1	1	0	254	21

=== International ===
Appearances and goals by national team and year
National team	Year	Apps	Goals
Azerbaijan national team	2006	4	0
Azerbaijan national team	2007	5	0
Total		9	0

== Honors ==
FC Baku

- Azerbaijan Premier League (1): 2005–06
