= Ramin Guliyev =

Azerbaijani footballer and manager (born 1981)

Personal information
- Full name: Ramin Masim oglu Guliyev
- Date of birth: 22 June 1981 (age 45)
- Place of birth: Baku, Azerbaijan SSR
- Height: 1.82 m (6 ft 0 in)
- Position: Defender

Team information
- Current team: Azerbaijan U17 (manager)

Senior career*
Years	Team	Apps	(Gls)
2000–2001	Dinamo Baku	10	(0)
2001–2002	Shafa Baku	23	(2)
2003	Dinamo Baku	2	(1)
2004	Neftchi Baku	10	(0)
2004–2007	FK Baku	74	(1)
2007–2008	Neftchi Baku	14	(0)
2008–2009	Olimpik Baku	17	(0)
2009–2010	Standard Sumgayit	28	(0)
2010–2011	Gabala	5	(0)

International career
2005–2008	Azerbaijan	17	(0)

Managerial career
- 2016–2017: Gabala (coach)
- 2018–: Azerbaijan U17
- * Club domestic league appearances and goals

Ramin Guliyev (born 22 June 1981) is an Azerbaijani football manager and former player who played as a defender. He is currently the manager of the Azerbaijan U17, and a former player of Azerbaijan. He was a former player of Dinamo Baku, which was eliminated in expect.

== Career ==
=== International ===
Guliyev made 17 appearances for the senior Azerbaijan national football team since his debut on 17 August 2005.

== Managerial career ==
On 13 December 2017, Guliyev was appointed as manager of Azerbaijan U17.

== Career statistics ==
=== Club ===
As of match played 8 May 2011

Club performance			League		Cup		Continental		Total	
Season	Club	League	Apps	Goals	Apps	Goals	Apps	Goals	Apps	Goals
Azerbaijan			League		Azerbaijan Cup		Europe		Total	
2000–01	Dinamo Baku	Azerbaijan Premier League	10	0			—		10	0
2001–02	Shafa Baku	Azerbaijan Premier League	23	2			—		23	2
2003–04	Dinamo Baku	Azerbaijan Premier League	2	1			—		2	1
2003–04	Neftchi Baku	Azerbaijan Premier League	10	0			—		10	0
2004-05	Baku	Azerbaijan Premier League	28	1			—		28	1
2005–06	Baku	Azerbaijan Premier League	25	0			—		25	0
2006-07	Baku	Azerbaijan Premier League	21	0			2	0	21	0
2007-08	Neftchi Baku	Azerbaijan Premier League	14	0			2	0	14	0
2008–09	Olimpik Baku	Azerbaijan Premier League	17	0			2	0	17	0
2009–10	Standard Sumgayit	Azerbaijan Premier League	28	0			—		28	0
2010–11	Gabala	Azerbaijan Premier League	5	0	0	0	—		5	0
Total	Azerbaijan		183	4			6	0	189	4
Career total			183	4			6	0	189	4

=== International ===
Azerbaijan
Year	Apps	Goals
2005	1	0
2006	4	0
2007	11	0
2008	1	0
Total	17	0

Statistics accurate as of match played 2 February 2008

== Honours ==
Shafa Baku

- Azerbaijan Cup (1): 2000–01

Neftchi Baku

- Azerbaijan Premier League (1): 2003–04
- Azerbaijan Cup (1): 2003–04

Baku

- Azerbaijan Premier League (1): 2005–06
- Azerbaijan Cup (1): 2004–05
