= Ceyhun Sultanov =

Azerbaijani footballer (born 1979)

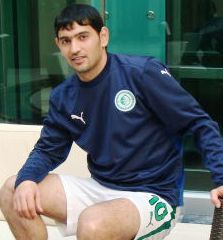

Personal information
- Full name: Ceyhun Oqtay oğlu Sultanov
- Date of birth: 12 June 1979 (age 47)
- Place of birth: Baku, Azerbaijan SSR, Soviet Union
- Height: 1.76 m (5 ft 9 in)
- Position: Central midfielder

Senior career*
Years	Team	Apps	(Gls)
1996–1997	Farid Baku	7	(0)
1997–1998	Neftchi Baku	21	(0)
1998–2001	Dinamo Baku	64	(8)
2003–2004	Machine Sazi	-	(-)
2004–2007	FC Baku	43	(8)
2007–2010	Khazar Lankaran	54	(3)
2010–2012	Kapaz PFC	50	(7)
2012	Sumgayit	16	(1)
2013	Gabala	3	(0)

International career
1998–2007	Azerbaijan	16	(1)
- * Club domestic league appearances and goals

Ceyhun Oqtay oğlu Sultanov (born 12 June 1979) is a retired Azerbaijani footballer who last played as a central midfielder for Azerbaijan Premier League club Gabala. He was voted Azerbaijani Footballer of the Year in 2006. Sultanov has made 16 appearances for the Azerbaijan national football team.

== Career ==
On 8 January 2013, Sultanov signed a one-year contract with Gabala FC.

== Career statistics ==
=== Club ===
As of 11 March 2013

Appearances and goals by club, season and competition
Season	Club	League	League		Cup		Other		Total	
Season	Club	League	App	Goals	App	Goals	App	Goals	App	Goals
Azerbaijan			League		Azerbaijan Cup		Europe		Total	
1996–97	Farid Baku	Azerbaijan Premier League	7	0			-		7	0
1997–98	Neftchi Baku	Azerbaijan Premier League	21	0			-		21	0
1998–99	Dinamo Baku	Azerbaijan Premier League	29	3			2	0	31	3
1999–2000	Dinamo Baku	Azerbaijan Premier League	21	4			-		21	4
2000–01	Dinamo Baku	Azerbaijan Premier League	14	1			-		14	1
2002-03	no league championship was held		-		-		-		0	0
Iran			League		Hazfi Cup		Asia		Total	
2003–04	Machine Sazi Dabiri Tabriz	Azadegan League					-			
Azerbaijan			League		Azerbaijan Cup		Europe		Total	
2004–05	FC Baku	Azerbaijan Premier League	9	2	0	0	-		9	2
2005–06	FC Baku	Azerbaijan Premier League	24	5			1	1	25	6
2006–07	FC Baku	Azerbaijan Premier League	10	1			2	0	12	1
2006–07	Khazar Lankaran	Azerbaijan Premier League	11	3	17	3	-		11	3
2007–08	Khazar Lankaran	Azerbaijan Premier League	17	0	17	3	1	0	18	0
2008–09	Khazar Lankaran	Azerbaijan Premier League	14	0	17	3	1	0	15	0
2009–10	Khazar Lankaran	Azerbaijan Premier League	12	0	17	3	-		12	0
2010–11	Kapaz	Azerbaijan Premier League	27	2	3	2	-		30	4
2011–12	Kapaz	Azerbaijan Premier League	23	5	1	0	-		24	5
2012–13	Sumgayit	Azerbaijan Premier League	16	1	0	0	-		16	1
2012–13	Gabala	Azerbaijan Premier League	3	0	2	0	-		5	0
Total	Azerbaijan		258	27	23	5	5	1	286	33
Total	Iran									
Total			258	27	23	5	5	1	286	33

=== International ===
Azerbaijan national team
Year	Apps	Goals
1998	1	1
2004	1	0
2007	7	0
2008	7	0
Total	16	1

=== International goals ===
#	Date	Venue	Opponent	Score	Result	Competition
1.	28 November 1998	Ganja, Azerbaijan	Estonia	1-1	2-1	Friendly

== Honours ==
=== Club ===
FC Baku

- Azerbaijan Premier League (1): 2005-06
- Azerbaijan Cup (1): 2004–05

Khazar Lankaran

- Azerbaijan Cup (1): 2007–08
- CIS Cup (1): 2008

=== Individual ===
- Azerbaijani Footballer of the Year (1): 2006
