= Kalidou Cissokho =

Senegalese footballer (born 1987)

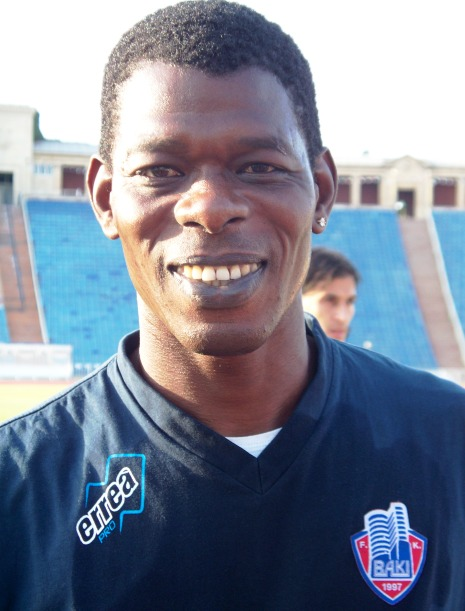
- Cissokho in 2009

Personal information
- Full name: Kalidou Cissokho
- Date of birth: 28 August 1978 (age 48)
- Place of birth: Dakar, Senegal
- Height: 1.86 m (6 ft 1 in)
- Position: Goalkeeper

Senior career*
Years	Team	Apps	(Gls)
1998–2004	ASC Jeanne d'Arc		
2004–2012	Baku	92	(0)

International career
2002	Senegal	1	(0)
- * Club domestic league appearances and goals

Kalidou Cissokho (born 28 August 1978 in Dakar) is a Senegalese former professional footballer who played as a goalkeeper.

== International career ==
Cissokho was called up to Senegals 2002 FIFA World Cup squad by Bruno Metsu as a backup to Tony Sylva.

== Career statistics ==
Appearances and goals by club, season and competition
Club	Season	League	League		Cup		Other		Total	
Club	Season	League	Apps	Goals	Apps	Goals	Apps	Goals	Apps	Goals
Azerbaijan			League		Azerbaijan Cup		Europe		Total	
Baku	2004–05	Azerbaijan Premier League	6	0	2	0	—		8	0
Baku	2005–06	Azerbaijan Premier League	18	0	3	0	2	0	23	0
Baku	2006–07	Azerbaijan Premier League	21	0	3	0	0	0	24	0
Baku	2007–08	Azerbaijan Premier League	17	0	2	0	2	0	21	0
Baku	2008–09	Azerbaijan Premier League	18	0	1	0	—		19	0
Baku	2009–10	Azerbaijan Premier League	8	0	2	0	5	0	15	0
Baku	2010–11	Azerbaijan Premier League	4	0	1	0	2	0	7	0
Baku	2011–12	Azerbaijan Premier League	0	0	0	0	—		0	0
Total			92	0	14	0	11	0	117	0

== Honours ==
ASC Jeanne d'Arc

- Senegal Premier League: 1999, 2001, 2002, 2003
- Senegal Assemblée Nationale Cup: 2001

FK Baku

- Azerbaijan Premier League: 2005–06, 2008–09
- Azerbaijan Cup: 2004–05, 2009–10, 2011–12
