= Saliou Diallo =

Guinean footballer (born 1976)

Personal information
- Full name: Saliou Diallo
- Date of birth: November 3, 1976 (age 49)
- Place of birth: Freetown, Sierra Leone
- Height: 1.85 m (6 ft 1 in)
- Position: Goalkeeper

Senior career*
Years	Team	Apps	(Gls)
1994–1997	Hafia		
1997–1998	Deinze	12	(0)
1998–1999	Westerlo	9	(0)
1999–2000	Gaziantepspor	2	(0)
2000–2002	Yimpaş Yozgatspor	31	(0)
2002–2003	Diyarbakırspor	4	(0)
2003–2005	Shamkir	0	(0)
2005–2006	Genclerbirliyi Sumqayit	36	(0)
2006	Baku	0	(0)
2007	Genclerbirliyi Sumqayit	14	(0)

International career
1994–1998	Guinea	16	(0)
- * Club domestic league appearances and goals as of 14 January 2014 (UTC)

Saliou Diallo (born 3 November 1976) is a retired Guinean football goalkeeper.

== Career ==
Diallo started his career at Hafia in 1994 before moving to Deinze in Belgium in 1997. Diallo signed for Westerlo in 1998 before moving to Turkey in 1999 with Gaziantepspor for a season. Diallo spent two seasons with Yimpaş Yozgatspor before signing for Diyarbakırspor for a season and then moved to Azerbaijan with Shamkir. Diallo stayed at Shamkir for a season and a half before moving to Genclerbirliyi Sumqayit in 2005 where he made 50 league appearances before retiring in 2007.

== International career ==
Diallo was a member of the Guinean squad's that went to the 1994 and 1998 African Cup of Nations.

== Career statistics ==
Club performance			League		Cup		Continental		Total	
Season	Club	League	Apps	Goals	Apps	Goals	Apps	Goals	Apps	Goals
1999–2000	Gaziantepspor	1.Lig	2	0	0	0	-		2	0
2000–2001	Yimpaş Yozgatspor	1.Lig	9	0	1	0	-		10	0
2001–02	Yimpaş Yozgatspor	Süper Lig	22	0	1	0	-		23	0
2002–03	Diyarbakırspor	Süper Lig	4	0	1	0	-		4	0
2004–05	Genclerbirliyi Sumqayit	Azerbaijan Premier League	19	0			-		19	0
2005–06	Genclerbirliyi Sumqayit	Azerbaijan Premier League	17	0			-		17	0
2006–07	Baku	Azerbaijan Premier League	0	0			2	0	2	0
2006–07	Genclerbirliyi Sumqayit	Azerbaijan Premier League	14	0			-		14	0
Career total			87	0	3	0	2	0	92	0
