= Andrezinho (footballer, born 1975) =

Azerbaijani footballer (born 1975)

Personal information
- Full name: André Luiz Ladaga
- Date of birth: 19 February 1975 (age 51)
- Place of birth: Rio de Janeiro, Brazil
- Height: 1.77 m (5 ft 10 in)
- Positions: Midfielder; defender

Senior career*
Years	Team	Apps	(Gls)
1994	Itaperuna		
1995	Vasco da Gama		
1996	Internacional		
1997	Fluminense	17	(0)
2000	Madureira		
2001	Olaria		
2001–2002	Vasco da Gama	3	(0)
2003	Olaria		
2003	America		
2004	Anapolina		
2004–2008	Baku	80	(6)
2009	Karvan	2	(0)
Total		102	(6)

International career^{‡}
2006–2008	Azerbaijan	11	(1)
- * Club domestic league appearances and goals as of November 2013 ‡ National team caps and goals as of December 2012

André Luiz Ladaga (born 19 February 1975), most commonly known as Andrezinho, is a former footballer who played as a midfielder. Born in Brazil, he played for the Azerbaijan national team.

== Career ==
In the summer of 2004 Andrezinho moved to Baku of the Azerbaijan Premier League. He made 80 league appearances for Baku before leaving at the end of the 2007–08 season. In the summer of 2009 Andrezinho joined Karvan, making 2 appearances before leaving in January 2010.

== International career ==
Andrezinho gained Azerbaijani citizenship in 2006, and went on to make his debut for the Azerbaijani team on 2 September 2006 against Serbia and Montenegro. He made a total of 13 appearances for Azerbaijan in two years scoring once, in a Euro 2008 qualifier against Kazakhstan on 6 September 2006.

== Career statistics ==
=== Club ===
Club statistics
Season	Club	League	League		Cup		Other		Total	
Season	Club	League	App	Goals	App	Goals	App	Goals	App	Goals
Azerbaijan			League		Azerbaijan Cup		Europe		Total	
2004–05	Baku	Azerbaijan Premier League	26	4			-		26	4
2005–06	Baku	Azerbaijan Premier League	22	0			2	0	24	0
2006–07	Baku	Azerbaijan Premier League	19	2			2	0	21	2
2007–08	Baku	Azerbaijan Premier League	13	0					13	0
2009–10	Karvan	Azerbaijan Premier League	2	0			-		2	0
Total			82	6			4	0	86	6

=== International ===
National team	Year	Apps	Goals
Azerbaijan	2006	4	1
Azerbaijan	2007	7	0
Total		13	1

Andre Ladaga: International Goals
#	Date	Venue	Opponent	Score	Result	Competition
1.	6 September 2006	Baku, Azerbaijan	Kazakhstan	1–1	1-1	UEFA Euro 2008 Qual.

== Honours ==
FC Baku

- Azerbaijan Premier League
  - Winner (1): 2005–06
