= Pathé Bangoura =

Guinean footballer

Personal information
- Date of birth: January 22, 1984 (age 42)
- Place of birth: Conakry, Guinea
- Height: 1.74 m (5 ft 9 in)
- Position: Forward

Senior career*
Years	Team	Apps	(Gls)
2001–2004	Saint-Étienne	11	(2)
2004–2005	→ Valence (loan)	11	(2)
2005–2006	Genclerbirliyi Sumqayit	23	(12)
2006	Baku	5	(0)
2007–2008	Olimpik Baku	20	(5)
2009	Muğan FK		

International career
2004	Guinea	1	(0)
- * Club domestic league appearances and goals

Pathé Bangoura (born January 22, 1984) is a Guinean former professional footballer who played as a forward. Bangoura played in France, for Saint-Étienne and Valence, as well as Azerbaijan where he played for Gänclärbirliyi Sumqayit, FK Baku, Olimpik Baku, and Muğan FK. He made one appearance for the Guinea national team in 2004.

== Career ==
Whilst playing for FK Baku in August 2006, Bangoura was subjected to racist abuse by Khazar Lankaran supporters. Following a series of discipline issues whilst at FK Baku, including being suspended from training, Bangoura was released during the winter transfer window.

Bangoura's only appearance for Guinea came in 2004.

== Career statistics ==
Appearances and goals by club, season and competition
Club	Season	League			Cup		Continental		Total	
Club	Season	Division	Apps	Goals	Apps	Goals	Apps	Goals	Apps	Goals
Saint-Étienne	2001–02	Ligue 2	8	2			–		8	2
Saint-Étienne	2002–03	Ligue 2	1	0			–		1	0
Saint-Étienne	2003–04	Ligue 2	2	0			–		2	0
Saint-Étienne	Total		11	2			0	0	11	2
Valence (loan)	2004–05	National	11	2			–		11	2
Gänclärbirliyi Sumqayit	2005–06	Azerbaijan Premier League	23	12			–		23	12
Baku	2006–07	Azerbaijan Premier League	5	0			2	0	7	0
Olimpik Baku	2006–07	Azerbaijan Premier League	12	3			–		12	3
Olimpik Baku	2007–08	Azerbaijan Premier League	8	2			–		8	2
Olimpik Baku	Total		20	5			0	0	20	5
Career total			70	21			2	0	72	21
