= Mumladze =

Mumladze (Georgian: მუმლაძე) is a Georgian surname. Notable people with the surname include:

- Meri Mumladze (born 2001), Georgian swimmer
- Shalva Mumladze (born 1978), Georgian footballer
