= Fernando Pérez (footballer) =

Argentine footballer

Personal information
- Birth name: Fernando Néstor Pérez
- Date of birth: September 11, 1980 (age 46)
- Place of birth: Argentina
- Height: 1.77 m (5 ft 10 in)
- Position: Striker

Senior career*
Years	Team	Apps	(Gls)
2004	Deportivo MacAllister		
2004–2005	Baku	44	(19)
2006	Barracas Central		
2007–2009	Baku	58	(22)
2011	Gimnástica de Torrelavega	10	(1)
- * Club domestic league appearances and goals as of 23 April 2013

Fernando Néstor Pérez (born 11 September 1980) is an Argentine footballer. He most recently played as a striker for Gimnástica de Torrelavega. He was the top scorer at the Azerbaijani football club Baku during the 2004-05 season with 13 league goals.

== Club ==
Club statistics
Season	Club	League	League		Cup		Other		Total	
Season	Club	League	App	Goals	App	Goals	App	Goals	App	Goals
Azerbaijan			League		Azerbaijan Cup		Europe		Total	
2004–05	Baku	Azerbaijan Premier League	26	13			-		26	13
2005–06	Baku	Azerbaijan Premier League	18	6			0	0	18	6
2006–07	Baku	Azerbaijan Premier League	9	6			0	0	9	6
2007–08	Baku	Azerbaijan Premier League	24	8					24	8
2008–09	Baku	Azerbaijan Premier League	24	8					24	8
2009–10	Baku	Azerbaijan Premier League	1	0			-		1	0
Total			102	41			0	0	102	41

== Achievements ==
Baku

- Azerbaijan Premier League winner (2): 2005–06, 2008–09
- Azerbaijan Cup winner (1): 2004–05
