= Leandro Melino Gomes =

Azerbaijani footballer (born 1976)

Leandro Gomes Leandro Qomeş
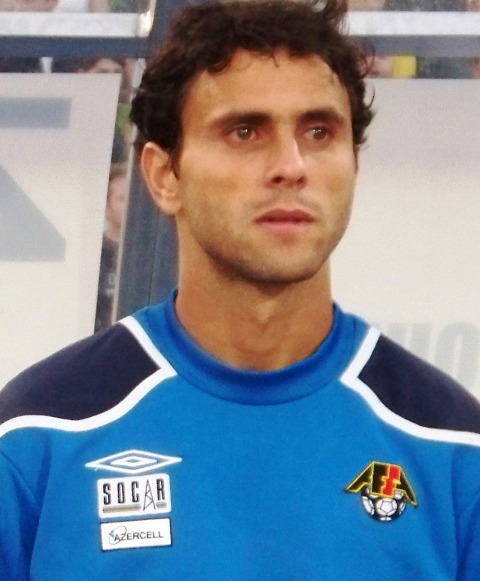
- Gomes with Azerbaijan in 2008

Personal information
- Full name: Leandro Melino Gomes
- Date of birth: 24 August 1976 (age 50)
- Place of birth: Casimiro de Abreu, Rio de Janeiro, Brazil
- Height: 1.76 m (5 ft 9 1/2 in)
- Position: Striker

Senior career*
Years	Team	Apps	(Gls)
2002	Joinville		
2002–2003	Naval 1º de Maio	9	(0)
2003	Goytacaz		
2004	Americano	??	(??)
2004–2008	Baku	86	(29)
2008–2009	Olimpik Baku	24	(10)
2009	Karvan	19	(3)
2010	Americano		
2010	Vila Nova	1	(0)
2011	Americano		
2012	Serra Macaense		

International career^{‡}
2006–2009	Azerbaijan	18	(0)

Managerial career
- 2016–: Sampaio Corrêa-RJ (assistant)
- * Club domestic league appearances and goals as of 2 October 2017 ‡ National team caps and goals as of 1 December 2009

Leandro Melino Gomes (Azerbaijani: Leandro Melino Qomeş; born 24 August 1976) is a former footballer who played as a striker. He is currently the assistant manager of Sampaio Corrêa-RJ. Born in Brazil, Gomes played for the Azerbaijan national team.

== International ==
Playing in the Azerbaijani football, he made his national team debut for Azerbaijan against Kazakhstan national football team, 6 September 2006.

== Clubs ==
Past clubs: Itaperuna, Macaé, Sport Recife, Figueirense, Joinville, Casimiro de Abreu, Goytacaz, Americano, Rio de Janeiro (all in Brazil), Naval 1º de Maio (in Portugal).

== Azerbaijan career statistics ==
As of 15 August 2013

Club performance			League		Cup		Continental		Total	
Season	Club	League	Apps	Goals	Apps	Goals	Apps	Goals	Apps	Goals
Azerbaijan			League		Azerbaijan Cup		Europe		Total	
2004–05	Baku	Azerbaijan Premier League	26	12			-		26	12
2005–06	Baku	Azerbaijan Premier League	23	8			2	0	25	8
2006–07	Baku	Azerbaijan Premier League	18	6			0	0	18	6
2007–08	Baku	Azerbaijan Premier League	19	3					19	3
2008–09	Olimpik-Shuvalan	Azerbaijan Premier League	24	10			1	0	25	10
2009–10	Karvan	Azerbaijan Premier League	19	3			-		19	3
Total			129	42			3	0	132	42

== Honors ==
FC Baku

- Azerbaijan Premier League
  - Winner: 2005–06
- Azerbaijan Cup
  - Winner: 2004–05
