= Darko Jovandić =

Serbian footballer

Personal information
- Full name: Darko Jovandić
- Date of birth: 4 February 1982 (age 44)
- Place of birth: Pančevo, SFR Yugoslavia
- Height: 1.73 m (5 ft 8 in)
- Position: Left-back

Senior career*
Years	Team	Apps	(Gls)
2001–2003	Proleter Zrenjanin	22	(0)
2004–2006	Budućnost Banatski Dvor	48	(0)
2006–2007	Bakı	8	(0)
2007	Banat Zrenjanin	9	(0)
2008	Celje	5	(1)
2009–2010	OFK Beograd	11	(0)
2010–2012	Banat Zrenjanin	30	(0)
2012	Timok	15	(0)
2013	Kolubara	7	(0)
2015–2020	Budućnost Srpska Crnja		
- * Club domestic league appearances and goals as of 17 July 2017

Darko Jovandić (Serbian Cyrillic: Дарко Јовандић; born 4 February 1982) is a Serbian retired footballer who played as a defender.

== Career ==
After playing with Proleter Zrenjanin and Budućnost Banatski Dvor, Jovandić moved abroad and joined Azerbaijan Top League club Baku. He subsequently returned to his country and signed with Banat Zrenjanin. In early 2008, Jovandić went across the border again in order to play for Slovenian PrvaLiga side Celje.
