= Ibrahim Qadirzada =

Azerbaijani footballer (born 1999)

Personal information
- Full name: İbrahim Qədirzadə
- Date of birth: 21 March 1999 (age 27)
- Position: Defender

Senior career*
Years	Team	Apps	(Gls)
2014–2016	Khazar Lankaran	17	(1)
2017–2018	Qarabağ	0	(0)
2018–2020	MOIK Baku		
2020–2021	Neftçi	0	(0)
2021	Samtredia	16	(0)
2021–2022	Kapaz		
2024-	Karvan İK	14	(0)
- * Club domestic league appearances and goals as of 22 June 2026

Ibrahim Qadirzada (Azerbaijani: İbrahim Qədirzadə; born 21 March 1999) is an Azerbaijani footballer who plays as a midfielder for Karvan İK.

== Club career ==
On 6 December 2015, Qadirzada made his debut in the Azerbaijan Premier League for Khazar Lankaran match against Gabala.
