= Yacouba Bamba =

Ivorian footballer

Personal information
- Date of birth: 16 December 1975 (age 50)
- Place of birth: Marcory, Abidjan, Ivory Coast
- Height: 1.76 m (5 ft 9 in)
- Position: Forward

Youth career
- Rio Sports

Senior career*
Years	Team	Apps	(Gls)
1994–1997	Africa Sports	127	(79)
1998	JFC Cocodi	0	(0)
1998–1999	FC Zürich	2	(1)
1999–2000	YF Juventus Zürich	49	(41)
2000–2002	Yverdon-Sport FC	32	(13)
2002–2003	FC Wil	32	(11)
2003–2004	YF Juventus Zürich	27	(34)
2004–2005	Diyarbakırspor	3	(0)
2005–2007	FK Karvan	39	(26)
2007–2009	Khazar Lenkoran	16	(5)
2009–2010	FK Karvan	13	(0)

International career
1996–1997	Ivory Coast	4	(0)
- * Club domestic league appearances and goals

Yacouba Bamba (born 16 December 1975) is an Ivorian former professional footballer who played as a forward for nine teams during his career, spanning four countries.

He played for the Ivory Coast national team four times, each time as a substitute.

== Personal life ==
Bamba was born in Marcory, a commune of Abidjan, Ivory Coast.

Bamba's son, Axel, is also a footballer who currently plays for Real Sporting de Gijón.

== Honours ==
Africa Sports

- Côte d'Ivoire Premier Division: 1996
- Côte d'Ivoire Cup runner-up: 1996, 1997

Yverdon-Sport

- Swiss Cup runner-up: 2000–01

FK Karvan

- Azerbaijan Premier League runner-up: 2005–06
- Azerbaijan Cup runner-up: 2005–06

Khazar Lankaran

- Azerbaijan Cup: 2007–08
- CIS Cup: 2008

Individual

- Azerbaijan Premier League top scorer: 2005–06
