= 2005–06 Azerbaijan Cup =

2005-06 Azerbaijan Cup
Tournament details
- Country: Azerbaijan
- Teams: 16

Final positions
- Champions: Karabakh
- Runners-up: Karvan

Tournament statistics
- Matches played: 29
- Goals scored: 54 (1.86 per match)

The Azerbaijan Cup 2005–06 was the 14th season of the annual cup competition in Azerbaijan with the final taking place on 3 June 2006. Sixteen teams competed in this year's competition. Baku were the defending champions.

== Round of 16 ==
The first legs were played on November 3 and 4 while the second legs were played on November 18 and 19, 2005.

Team 1	Agg.	Team 2	1st leg	2nd leg
Neftchi Baku	3–2	Gänclärbirliyi Sumqayit	1–2	2–0
Goy Gol	0–1	Turan Tovuz	0–0	0–1
Khazar-Lenkoran II	1–2	Karabakh	0–0	1–2
AZAL	0–3	FK Baku	0–0	0–3
MKT Araz	7–1	Bakili	5–1	2–0
Shahdag	0–3	Khazar-Lenkoran	0–2	0–1
Kəpəz	2–4	Karvan	1–3	1–1
Göyazan	1–2	Inter Baku	1–1	0–1

== Quarterfinals ==
Three of the ties first legs were played on March 3 and 04, with their second legs being played on March 17 and 18, 2006. The exception to this was the MKT Araz vs Khazar-Lenkoran tie which was played on April 24 and 27.

Team 1	Agg.	Team 2	1st leg	2nd leg
Karabakh	3–2	Baku	3–2	0–0
Neftchi Baku	3–0	Turan Tovuz	3–0	0–0
Karvan	5–2	Inter Baku	1–1	4–1
MKT Araz	0–1	Khazar-Lenkoran	0–1	0–0

== Semifinals ==
The first legs were played on April 25 and May 3, 2006. The second legs were played on May 3 and 7, 2006.

25 April 2006 1st leg	Neftchi Baku	0–0	Karabakh	Tofiq Bahramov Stadium, Baku
		[ Report]		Attendance: 500

3 May 2006 2nd leg	Karabakh	1–0 (1–0 agg.)	Neftchi Baku	Tofiq Bahramov Stadium, Baku^{1}
	S.Musayev 30'	[ Report]		Attendance: 3,500

3 May 2006 1st leg	Khazar-Lenkoran	1–0	Karvan	Tofik Bakhramov Stadium, Baku
	Liţă 87'	[ Report]

7 May 2006 2nd leg	Karvan	3–0 (3–1 agg.)	Khazar-Lenkoran	Yevlakh City Stadium, Yevlakh
	K.Karimov 20'; Ismayilov 20'; I.Mammadov 79'	[ Report]		Attendance: 500

== Final ==
3 June 2006

Karabakh	2–1	Karvan
Hakverdiev 45'; Musayev 87'	Summary	Roman Akhalkatsi 1'

Shafa, Baku
Attendance: 6,000
Referee: Vusal Aliyev

== Notes ==
- Qarabağ have played their home games at the Tofiq Bahramov Stadium since 1993 due to the ongoing situation in Quzanlı.
