= Ruslan Musayev =

Azerbaijani footballer (born 1979)

Personal information
- Date of birth: 11 May 1979 (age 47)
- Height: 1.75 m (5 ft 9 in)
- Position: Midfielder

Senior career*
Years	Team	Apps	(Gls)
1996–1997	Azerbaijan U18	25	(4)
1997–1998	Lelle SK	6	(2)
1998	ÍA	2	(0)
1998–1999	Shafa Baku	4	(0)
1999	Viljandi Tulevik	4	(0)
1999–2001	Shafa Baku	31	(5)
2001–2002	MOIK Baku	5	(0)
2002–2003	Shafa Baku	2	(0)
2002	Terek Grozny	4	(1)
2003–2004	MOIK Baku	16	(7)
2004–2005	Qarabağ	39	(2)
2006	Baku	5	(0)
2006	Olimpik Baku	5	(0)
2007	Simurq	5	(0)
2007–2008	Gänclärbirliyi Sumqayit	22	(2)
2008	Nebitçi Balkanabat		

International career
1997–2004	Azerbaijan	30	(0)
- * Club domestic league appearances and goals

Ruslan Musayev (born 11 May 1979) is a retired Azerbaijani football player who played for the Azerbaijan national team.

== National team statistics ==
Azerbaijan national team
Year	Apps	Goals
1997	6	0
1998	5	0
1999	0	0
2000	5	0
2001	1	0
2002	2	0
2003	7	0
2004	4	0
Total	30	0
