= Stanislav Loban =

Ukrainian footballer

Personal information
- Date of birth: 15 February 1977 (age 49)
- Place of birth: Odesa, Ukrainian SSR
- Height: 1.76 m (5 ft 9 in)
- Position: Striker

Senior career*
Years	Team	Apps	(Gls)
1997–1998	SKA-Lotto Odesa	26	(4)
1998–2000	Chornomorets Odesa	0	(0)
1999	→ Hebar Pazardzhik (loan)		
1999	Chornomorets-2 Odesa	2	(0)
2001–2002	Dong Thap		
2002	Torpedo Moscow Reserves		
2003–2005	Stal Dniprodzerzhynsk	15	(2)
2005	Podillya Khmelnytskyi	12	(0)
2006	FK Baku	9	(1)
2006	Naftovyk Okhtyrka	6	(0)
2007	O.L.KAR. Sharhorod		
2007	Spartak Rozdilna		
2008–2010	Sonyachna Dolyna Odesa		
2008	→ Marrion Odesa		
2009	→ Bastion-2 Illichivsk		
2009	→ Syhma Kherson		
2010–2012	Dniester Ovidiopol / FC Odesa	56	(3)
2012–2013	Arkadiya Odesa		
- * Club domestic league appearances and goals

Stanislav Loban (Ukrainian: Станіслав Лобан; born 15 February 1977) is a retired Ukrainian footballer who played as a forward.

== Honors ==
FC Baku

- Azerbaijan Premier League
  - Winner (1): 2005–06
