= Fizuli Mammadov =

Azerbaijani footballer (born 1977)

Personal information
- Full name: Fizuli Nureddin oğlu Mammedov
- Birth name: Feyzar Mammadov (until 1983)
- Date of birth: 8 September 1977 (age 49)
- Place of birth: Soviet Union
- Position: Defender

Senior career*
Years	Team	Apps	(Gls)
1995–1996	Neftçi Bakı	8	(0)
1996–1998	Prykarpattya Ivano-Frankivsk	0	(0)
1998–1999	Neftçi Bakı		
1999	OIK Baku		
2000	ANS Pivani Baku		
2001–2002	Shafa Baku	28	(1)
2002–2004	Mashin Sazi Tabriz		
2004–2008	Xəzər Lənkəran	67	(0)
2009	→ Simurq (loan)	10	(0)
2009	FK Olimpik Baku	5	(0)
2010	FK Karvan	12	(0)

International career
1998–2003	Azerbaijan	9	(0)

Managerial career
- 2013-2015: Ravan Baku FK
- 2015-2016: Zira FK
- 2016-2017: İnter Baku
- 2017-2018: Sabail FK
- 2018-2020: Neftçi PFK
- 2025: Mingechevir FK
- 2026: Karvan İK
- * Club domestic league appearances and goals

Fizuli Mammadov (born 8 September 1977) is an Azerbaijani football coach.

== Career ==
=== Coaching career ===
Since November 2025, Fizuli Mammadov had been working as a coach at Karvan İK. On 23 January 2026, he was appointed the club's head coach until the end of the season. On 29 May 2026, his contract with the club expired and was not renewed, and Mammadov left his position.

== National team statistics ==
Azerbaijan national team
Year	Apps	Goals
1998	1	0
1999	0	0
2000	0	0
2001	1	0
2002	5	0
2003	2	0
Total	9	0
