= Bakhtiyar Gulamov =

Azerbaijani footballer (1949-2014)

Bakhtiyar Gulamov Bəxtiyar Qulamov
Personal information
- Full name: Bakhtiyar Gulamov
- Date of birth: 10 July 1949
- Place of birth: Baku, Azerbaijan SSR, Soviet Union
- Date of death: 7 January 2014 (aged 64)
- Place of death: Baku, Azerbaijan
- Height: 1.75 m (5 ft 9 in)
- Position: Midfielder

Bakhtiyar Gulamov (Azerbaijani: Bəxtiyar Qulamov; 10 July 1949 – 7 January 2014) was an Azerbaijani footballer who primarily played as a midfielder.

Bakhtiyar Gulamov died on 7 January 2014, aged 64, in his hometown of Baku, Azerbaijan.
