= Samir Musayev =

Azerbaijani footballer (born 1979)

Personal information
- Date of birth: 17 March 1979 (age 47)
- Height: 1.78 m (5 ft 10 in)
- Position: Forward

Senior career*
Years	Team	Apps	(Gls)
1998–2000	Dinamo Baku	66	(8)
2001–2002	Shafa Baku	33	(11)
2002–2006	Qarabağ	85	(44)
2007	Baku	8	(1)
2007	Simurq	10	(1)
2008–2009	Olimpik Baku	25	(5)
2009–2010	Turan Tovuz	24	(4)
2010–2011	Simurq	8	(0)

International career
2001–2006	Azerbaijan	3	(0)
- * Club domestic league appearances and goals

Samir Musayev (born 17 March 1979) is an Azerbaijani former professional footballer who] played as a forward. He made three appearances for Azerbaijan national team.

== Career statistics ==
=== Club ===
Appearances and goals by club, season and competition
Club	Season	League			National cup (Note: Includes Azerbaijan Cup.)		Continental		Total	
Club	Season	Division	Apps	Goals	Apps	Goals	Apps	Goals	Apps	Goals
Dinamo Baku	1997–98	Azerbaijan Premier League	10	0			–		10	0
Dinamo Baku	1998–99	Azerbaijan Premier League	26	4			–		26	4
Dinamo Baku	1999–00	Azerbaijan Premier League	21	2			–		21	2
Dinamo Baku	2000–01	Azerbaijan Premier League	9	2			–		9	2
Dinamo Baku	Total		66	8					66	8
Shafa Baku	2000–01	Azerbaijan Premier League	9	3			–		9	3
Shafa Baku	2001–02	Azerbaijan Premier League	24	8			–		24	8
Shafa Baku	Total		33	11					33	11
Qarabağ	2002–03	Azerbaijan Premier League	no league championship was held.							
Qarabağ	2003–04	Azerbaijan Premier League	23	20			–		23	20
Qarabağ	2004–05	Azerbaijan Premier League	30	11			–		30	11
Qarabağ	2005–06	Azerbaijan Premier League	22	10			–		22	10
Qarabağ	2006–07	Azerbaijan Premier League	10	3			–		10	3
Qarabağ	Total		85	44					85	44
Baku	2006–07	Azerbaijan Premier League	8	1			–		8	1
Simurq	2007–08	Azerbaijan Premier League	10	1			–		10	1
Olimpik Baku	2007–08	Azerbaijan Premier League	10	4			–		10	4
Olimpik Baku	2008–09	Azerbaijan Premier League	15	1			–		15	1
Olimpik Baku	Total		25	5					25	5
Turan Tovuz	2009–10	Azerbaijan Premier League	24	4			–		24	4
Simurq	2010–11	Azerbaijan Premier League	8	0			–		8	0
Career total			259	74					259	74

=== International ===
Azerbaijan national team
Year	Apps	Goals
2001	1	0
2002	0	0
2003	0	0
2004	0	0
2005	0	0
2006	2	0
Total	3	0

== Honours ==
Individual

- Azerbaijan Premier League top scorer: 2003–04
