= Tomislav Mišura =

Slovenian footballer

Personal information
- Date of birth: 13 May 1981 (age 45)
- Place of birth: Novo Mesto, SFR Yugoslavia
- Height: 1.85 m (6 ft 1 in)
- Position: Forward

Youth career
- Krka
- Olimpija Ljubljana
- 1999–2000: Hajduk Split
- 2000–2002: Omladinac Vranjic

Senior career*
Years	Team	Apps	(Gls)
2002–2004	Admira Wacker Mödling	17	(0)
2005–2006	Neftchi Baku	18	(9)
2006	Lokomotiv Sofia	4	(0)
2007	Kamen Ingrad	3	(0)
2007–2008	FC Wil	12	(2)
2008–2009	FC Gossau	26	(5)
2009–2010	Interblock Ljubljana	6	(1)
2010	Qingdao Jonoon	5	(0)
2010–2011	Newcastle Jets	1	(0)
2011–2012	Tien Giang		
2012–2013	Krka Novo Mesto	14	(2)
2013	Beijing Baxy	14	(1)
2014–2016	Grindavík	33	(11)
2016	→ Reynir Sandgerði (loan)	15	(4)
2017	Reynir Sandgerði	15	(7)
- * Club domestic league appearances and goals

Tomislav Mišura (born 13 May 1981) is a Slovenian former professional footballer who played as a forward.

== Career ==
Mišura was born in Novo Mesto. His previous club was Interblock. In November 2010 he trialled with the A-League club Newcastle Jets. The Jets then signed Mišura on an injury replacement contract.
