= Shalva Mumladze =

Georgian footballer (born 1978)

Personal information
- Full name: Shalva Mumladze
- Date of birth: 18 August 1978 (age 48)
- Place of birth: Soviet Union
- Position: Midfielder

Senior career*
Years	Team	Apps	(Gls)
2001–2002	Kolkheti-1913 Poti		
2002–2003	Spartak Sumy	40	(3)
2004	Torpedo Kutaisi		
2005	Sahdag Qusar	9	(5)
- * Club domestic league appearances and goals

Shalva Mumladze (born 18 August 1978) is a footballer who has played as a midfielder for clubs in Georgia, Ukraine and Azerbaijan.

== Club career ==
Mumladze began playing professional football in the Georgian leagues, playing for Umaglesi Liga side FC Kolkheti-1913 Poti. In March 2002, Mumladze moved to Ukraine where he would spend two seasons with FC Spartak Sumy playing the Ukrainian First League. Mumladze returned to Georgia in 2004, playing for losing Georgia Cup finalist FC Torpedo Kutaisi. He moved to Azerbaijan in 2005, scoring five goals in the Azerbaijan Premier League for FC Sahdag Qusar.
