= Tofiq Ismayilov Stadium =

Sports venue in Baku, Azerbaijan

Surakhani Stadium named after Tofig Ismayilov
- Location: Surakhani, Baku, Azerbaijan
- Capacity: 15,000
- Surface: Grass

Tenant
- Neftchi ISM

Tofiq Ismayilov Stadium, also referred as Surakhani Stadium, is a multi-use stadium in Suraxanı area of Baku, Azerbaijan. It is currently used mostly for football matches and was the former home stadium of Qarabağ FK. Currently, it is the home stadium for the Azerbaijan First Division club Neftchi ISM. The stadium holds 15,000 people.
