= 2004–05 Azerbaijan Cup =

2004-05 Azerbaijan Cup
Tournament details
- Country: Azerbaijan
- Teams: 16

Final positions
- Champions: Baku
- Runners-up: Inter Baku

Tournament statistics
- Matches played: 37
- Goals scored: 124 (3.35 per match)

The Azerbaijan Cup 2004–05 was the 13th season of the annual cup competition in Azerbaijan with the final taking place on 28 May 2005. Sixteen teams competed in this year's competition. Neftchi Baku were the defending champions.

== First round ==
The first legs were played on October 20, 2004 and the second legs on October 27, 2004.

| Team 1 | Agg. | Team 2 | 1st leg | 2nd leg |
|---|---|---|---|---|
| Goyca Baku | 2–7 | Bakili Baku | 2–4 | 0–3 |
| Adliyya Baku II | 3–11 | Karabakh | 1–4 | 2–7 |
| Ganclik-95 Sumqayit | 0–10 | Inter Baku | 0–5 | 0–5 |
| Shahdag Qusar | 0–2 | MOIK Baku | 0–2 | 0–0 |
| Energetik | 1–7 | Karvan | 0–5 | 1–2 |
| Khazar Lankaran II | 2–3 | Shafa Baku | 0–2 | 2–1 |
| Vilas Masali | 0–8 | MKT Araz | 0–1 | 0–7 |
| AMMK Baku | 1–4 | FK Gäncä | 0–2 | 1–2 |
| Neftchala | 0–7 | Shamkir | 0–2 | 0–5 |

== Round of 16 ==
The first legs were played on November 24, 2004 and the second legs on December 1, 2004.

| Team 1 | Agg. | Team 2 | 1st leg | 2nd leg |
|---|---|---|---|---|
| Neftchi Baku | 6–2 | Bakili Baku | 3–2 | 3–0 |
| Karabakh | 1–2 | Inter Baku | 1–0 | 0–2 |
| MOIK Baku | 1–1 (a) | Gäazan Qazax | 0–0 | 1–1 |
| Karvan | 0–0 (–p.) | Khazar-Lenkoran | 1–1 | 1–1 |
| Shafa Baku | 1–5 | Gänclärbirliyi Sumqayit | 1–1 | 0–4 |
| MKT Araz | 2–2 (a) | Turan Tovuz | 1–0 | 1–2 |
| FK Gäncä | 4–4 (a) | Karat Baki | 2–3 | 2–1 |
| Shamkir | 1–3 | Baku | 0–0 | 1–3 |

== Quarterfinals ==
The first legs were played on March 7, 2005 and the second legs on March 15, 2005.

| Team 1 | Agg. | Team 2 | 1st leg | 2nd leg |
|---|---|---|---|---|
| Neftchi Baku | 0–0 (3–4p.) | Inter Baku | 0-0 | 0–0 |
| Gänclärbirliyi Sumqayit | 1–3 | MKT Araz | 0–0 | 1–3 |
| Karat Baki | 1–3 | Baku | 1–2 | 0–1 |
| MOIK Baku | 0–2 | Khazar-Lenkoran | 0-1 | 0–1 |

== Semifinals ==
The first legs were played on April 16, 2005 and the second legs on April 29, 2005.

| Team 1 | Agg. | Team 2 | 1st leg | 2nd leg |
|---|---|---|---|---|
| Inter Baku | 3–2 | Khazar Lankaran | 2–1 | 1–1 |
| MKT Araz | 1–2 | Baku | 0–1 | 1–1 |

=== First leg ===
16 April 2005

| Inter Baku | 2–1 | Khazar |
|---|---|---|
| Mammadov 62'; Kotov 68' | | Aliyev 33' |

Shafa Stadium, Baku
Attendance: 2,500

16 April 2005

| MKT Araz | 0−1 | Baku |
|---|---|---|
| | | Andrezinho 6' |

Heydar Aliyev Stadium, Imishli
Attendance: 6,000

=== Second leg ===
29 April 2005

| Khazar Lankaran | 1–1 | Inter Baku |
|---|---|---|
| Lychkin 66' | | Makowski 85' |

Lankaran City Stadium, Lankaran
Attendance: 8,000

Inter Baku won 3–2 on aggregate.

29 April 2005

| Baku | 1−1 | MKT Araz |
|---|---|---|
| Pérez 77' | | Aghakishiyev 77' |

Tofik Bakhramov Stadium, Baku
Attendance: 3,000

Baku won 2–1 on aggregate.

== Final ==
28 May 2005

| Baku | 2–1 (a.e.t.) | Inter Baku |
|---|---|---|
| Leandro Gomes 5'; Andrezinho 114'; Andrezinho (red card) 119' | Summary | Makowski 52'; Idahor (red card) 112' |

Tofig Bakhramov Republican Stadium, Baku
Attendance: 10,000
Referee: Fariz Yusifov
