= 2008–09 Azerbaijan Premier League =

Azerbaijan Premier League
- Season: 2008–09
- Champions: FK Baku (2nd title)
- Relegated: Bakılı Baku; MOIK Baku
- Champions League: FK Baku
- Europa League: Inter Baku; Simurq Zaqatala; Karabakh (via domestic cup)
- Matches: 182
- Goals: 443 (2.43 per match)
- Top goalscorer: Walter Guglielmone (17)
- Biggest home win: Baku 7–0 Turan
- Biggest away win: Bakılı Baku 0–7 Baku
- Highest scoring: Baku 7–0 Turan; MOIK 1–6 Olimpik; Bakılı Baku 0–7 Baku

The 2008–09 Azerbaijan Premier League is the 17th season of Azerbaijan Premier League, the Azerbaijani professional league for association football clubs, since its establishment in 1992. Inter Baku were the defending champions, having won the previous season.

== Teams ==
FK Gänclärbirliyi Sumqayit and ABN Bärdä were relegated after finishing the previous season in 13th and 14th place, respectively. They were replaced by the champions of the two groups in the Azerbaijan First Division, Bakılı Baku and MOIK Baku.

On 8 July 2008, FK Masallı withdrew their participation from the league, citing competitional and financial problems as reasons. Although it was unclear as of 21 July if the Azerbaijan Football Federation would be naming a substitute or if the championship would start with just 13 teams, shortly thereafter AFFA named FK NBC Salyan to replace Masallı in top league.

On 31 October 2008, FK NBC Salyan changed their name to FK Mughan.

=== Stadia and locations ===
Location of teams in Azerbaijan Premier League 2008–09

Team	Venue	Capacity
Bakılı Baku	Shafa Stadium	8,150
FK Baku	Tofik Bakhramov Stadium	29,858
Inter Baku	Shafa Stadium	8,150
Karabakh	Guzanli Olympic Stadium^{1}	2,000
Karvan	Yevlakh Stadium	5,000
Khazar Lankaran	Lankaran City Stadium	15,000
MOIK Baku	MOIK Stadium	1,000
Mughan	Salyany Olympic Sport Complex Stadium	3,000
Neftchi Baku	Tofik Bakhramov Stadium	29,858
Olimpik Baku	Shafa Stadium	8,150
FK Qäbälä	Gabala City Stadium	2,000
Simurq Zaqatala	Zaqatala City Stadium	3,000
Standard Baku	Shafa Stadium	8,150
Turan Tovuz	Tovuz City Stadium	6,000

^{1}Karabakh played their home matches at Surakhani Stadium in Baku before moving to their current stadium on 3 May 2009.

=== Personnel ===
Team	Head coach	Team captain	Club chairman
Bakılı Baku	(Azerbaijan) Bakhtiyar Gulamov	(Azerbaijan) Vasif Aliyev	Misir Abilov
FK Baku	(North Macedonia) Gjoko Hadžievski	(Azerbaijan) Rafael Amirbekov	Hafiz Mammadov
Inter Baku	(Ukraine) Valentin Khodukin	(Azerbaijan) Khagani Mammadov	Georgi Nikolov
Karabakh	(Azerbaijan) Gurban Gurbanov	(Azerbaijan) Farhad Veliyev	Abdulbari Goozal
Karvan	vacant	(Azerbaijan) Ilham Yadullayev	Javanshir Shiraliyev
Khazar Lankaran	(Azerbaijan) Igor Ponomarev	(Azerbaijan) Dmitry Kramarenko	Mübariz Mensimov
MOIK Baku	(Azerbaijan) Akif Ibadov	(Azerbaijan) Ismail Mammadov	Safar Abiyev
Mughan	(Azerbaijan) Vladislav Gadyrov	(Azerbaijan) Tarlan Khalilov	Fizuli Aliyev
Neftchi Baku	(Azerbaijan) Boyukaga Agaev	(Azerbaijan) Zaur Tagizade	Akper Hajiyev
Olimpik Baku	(Azerbaijan) Asker Abdullayev	(Azerbaijan) Tarlan Akhmedov	Rasul Rasulov
FK Qäbälä	(Azerbaijan) Ramiz Mammadov	(Azerbaijan) Kanan Karimov	Taleh Heydarov
Simurq Zaqatala	(Ukraine) Roman Pokora	(Ukraine) Mykhailo Starostyak	Zaur Mammadov
Standard Baku	(Azerbaijan) Rafik Mirzoyev	(Azerbaijan) Huseyn Mahammadov	Emin Babayev
Turan Tovuz	(Azerbaijan) Etimad Gurbanov	(Tunisia) Asaf Gadiri	Rashid Maherramov

=== Managerial changes ===
Team	Outgoing manager	Manner of departure	Date of vacancy	Replaced by	Date of appointment
Standard Baku	(Georgia (country)) Badri Kvaratskhelia	Resigned	20 April 2009	(Azerbaijan) Rafik Mirzoyev	20 April 2009
Mughan	(Azerbaijan) Nadir Gasymov	Sacked	5 May 2009	(Azerbaijan) Vladislav Gadirov	20 April 2009

== League table ==
Pos	Team	Pld	W	D	L	GF	GA	GD	Pts	Qualification or relegation
1	Baku (C)	26	20	2	4	54	13	+41	62	Qualification for Champions League second qualifying round
2	Inter Baku	26	18	7	1	54	16	+38	61	Qualification for Europa League first qualifying round
3	Simurq	26	16	5	5	39	20	+19	53	Qualification for Europa League first qualifying round
4	Khazar Lankaran	26	15	5	6	49	21	+28	50	
5	Qarabağ	26	14	7	5	35	22	+13	49	Qualification for Europa League second qualifying round (Note: Karabakh won the 2008–09 Azerbaijan Cup and therefore qualified for the second qualifying round of the UEFA Europa League.)
6	Olimpik Baku	26	12	8	6	32	18	+14	44	
7	Standard Baku	26	12	3	11	30	31	−1	39	
8	Neftçi Baku	26	9	9	8	30	21	+9	36	
9	Karvan	26	10	4	12	28	33	−5	34	
10	Gabala	26	9	6	11	28	21	+7	33	
11	Turan	26	5	5	16	19	45	−26	20	
12	Mughan	26	4	2	20	19	53	−34	14	
13	Bakili (R)	26	3	3	20	14	65	−51	12	Relegation to Azerbaijan First Division
14	MOIK Baku (R)	26	1	2	23	12	64	−52	5	Relegation to Azerbaijan First Division

Source: Soccerway.com
Rules for classification: 1) points; 2) goal difference; 3) number of goals scored.
(C) Champions; (R) Relegated

== Results ==
Home \ Away	BKL	BAK	INT	QAR	KAR	KHA	MOI	MUG	NEF	OLI	GAB	SIM	STA	TUR
Bakili		0–7	1–5	1–2	2–1	1–3	1–0	3–2	0–2	1–2	0–1	0–2	0–2	0–2
Baku	3–1		0–0	2–0	0–3	0–0	1–0	4–0	2–0	3–1	3–0	1–0	2–0	7–0
Inter Baku	4–0	0–1		1–1	4–0	2–2	2–0	2–0	2–2	1–0	1–1	2–1	3–0	3–0
Qarabağ	3–0	0–2	1–1		3–2	1–0	3–0	3–1	1–1	1–1	0–0	0–2	0–1	4–2
Karvan	2–0	0–1	1–2	0–0		1–0	2–0	3–1	1–1	0–1	2–1	1–3	3–1	1–1
Khazar Lankaran	5–0	3–0	2–4	1–3	0–0		2–0	2–1	2–0	0–0	1–2	3–1	4–0	5–0
MOIK Baku	1–1	0–3	0–3	0–1	0–3	0–4		1–3	0–5	1–6	0–3	2–4	1–2	2–0
Mughan	1–0	0–4	1–2	1–2	0–1	1–3	1–1		0–3	0–1	0–4	1–2	1–3	2–1
Neftçi Baku	3–0	0–1	1–3	0–1	0–1	2–1	3–1	0–0		1–2	0–0	0–0	2–1	1–1
Olimpik Baku	4–0	2–1	1–1	0–1	1–0	0–1	3–1	1–0	0–0		1–0	0–2	0–0	3–0
Gabala	3–0	0–1	0–1	1–2	3–0	0–1	2–0	4–1	0–1	1–1		0–0	2–1	0–1
Simurq	3–0	2–1	0–2	0–0	2–0	2–2	1–0	2–0	0–2	1–1	1–0		3–1	3–1
Standard Baku	1–1	1–2	0–2	2–1	2–0	0–1	2–1	1–0	1–0	0–0	2–0	0–1		4–1
Turan	1–1	0–2	0–1	0–1	4–0	0–1	3–0	0–1	0–0	1–0	0–0	0–1	0–2	

Source: Soccerway.com
Legend: Blue = home team win; Yellow = draw; Red = away team win.

== Season statistics ==
=== Top scorers ===
Rank	Player	Club	Goals
1	(Uruguay) Walter Guglielmone	Inter	17
2	(Bulgaria) Ivan Tsvetkov	Khazar	15
3	(Ukraine) Volodymyr Mazyar	Simurq	11
3	(Georgia (country)) Amiran Mujiri	Baku	11
5	(Azerbaijan) Leandro Gomes	Olimpik Baku	10
5	(Uruguay) Angel Gutierrez	Standard	10
7	(Nigeria) Victor Igbekoyi	Qarabağ/Turan	8
7	(Iran) Farzad Hatami	Gabala	8
7	(Brazil) Rômulo	Khazar	8
10	(Azerbaijan) Bakhtiyar Soltanov	Baku	7

=== Hat-tricks ===
Player	For	Against	Result	Date
(Iran) Farzad Hatami	Gabala	MOIK	3–0	17 August 2008
(Bulgaria) Ivan Tsvetkov^{4}	Khazar	MOIK	4–0	26 September 2008
(Azerbaijan) Leandro Gomes	Olimpik Baku	Bakılı	4–0	7 March 2009
(Azerbaijan) Bakhtiyar Soltanov	Baku	Bakılı	3–1	21 March 2009
(Nigeria) Victor Igbekoi	Turan	Karvan	4–0	12 April 2009
(Uruguay) Walter Guglielmone	Inter	MOIK	3–0	12 April 2009
(Azerbaijan) Nariman Äzimov	Olimpik Baku	MOIK	6–1	11 May 2009

- ^{4} Player scored 4 goals

=== Scoring ===
- First goal of the season: Kanan Karimov for Gabala against NBC Salyan (9 August 2008)
- Fastest goal of the season: 1st minute,
  - Angel Gutierrez for Standard Baku against Gabala (25 October 2008)
  - Farzad Hatami for Gabala against Karvan (22 March 2009)
- Largest winning margin: 7 goals
  - Bakılı Baku 0–7 Baku (28 September 2008)
  - Baku 7–0 Turan Tovuz (22 November 2008)
- Highest scoring game: 7 goals
  - Bakılı Baku 0–7 Baku (28 September 2008)
  - Baku 7–0 Turan Tovuz (22 November 2008)
  - MOIK Baku 1–6 Olimpik Baku (11 May 2009)
- Most goals scored in a match by a single team: 7 goals
  - Bakılı Baku 0–7 Baku (28 September 2008)
  - Baku 7–0 Turan Tovuz (22 November 2008)
- Most goals scored in a match by a losing team: 2 goals
  - Bakılı Baku 3–2 NBC Salyan (9 November 2008)
  - Khazar Lankaran 2–4 Inter Baku (9 November 2008)
  - Karabakh 3–2 Karvan (29 November 2008)
  - MOIK Baku 2–4 Simurq (1 March 2009)
  - Karabakh 4–2 Turan Tovuz (5 April 2009)

=== Clean sheets ===
- Most clean sheets: 19
  - Baku
- Fewest clean sheets: 1
  - Bakılı Baku
  - MOIK Baku
