= Heydar Aliyev Stadium =

Coordinates: 39.8697°N 48.0600°E

Imishli City Stadium named after Heydar Aliyev
- Interactive map of Imishli City Stadium named after Heydar Aliyev
- Location: Imishli, Azerbaijan
- Capacity: 8,500
- Surface: Grass

Construction
- Built: 2006

Tenant
- Mil-Muğan

Heydar Aliyev Stadium is a multi-use stadium in Imishli, Azerbaijan. It is named after the former Azerbaijani president Heydar Aliyev. It is currently used mostly for football matches and is the home stadium of Mil-Muğan. The stadium holds 8,500 people and was opened in 2006.
