= 2006–07 Azerbaijan Top League =

Azerbaijan Top League
- Season: 2006–07
- Champions: Khazar Lenkoran
- Relegated: FK Gäncä; Sahdag Qusar
- Champions League: Khazar Lenkoran
- UEFA Cup: Neftchi Baku; MKT Araz
- Intertoto Cup: FK Baku
- Matches played: 144
- Goals scored: 246 (1.71 per match)
- Top goalscorer: Zaur Ramazanov (20 goals)

2006–07 Azerbaijan Premier League was the fifteenth season of top-tier football in Azerbaijan. The season started with 14 teams, but ended with 13 after FK Gäncä were excluded. FK Baku were the defending champions with the season began on 5 August 2006 and ended on 23 May 2007. At the end of the season the league was dissolved and replaced by the Azerbaijan Premier League.

== Teams ==
MOIK Baku and Göyazan Qazax were relegated after finishing the previous season in 13th and 14th place. They were replaced by Gilan Qäbälä and Simurq Zaqatala from the Azerbaijan First Division.

=== Stadia and locations ===
Location of teams in Azerbaijan Premier League 2006–07

Team	Venue	Capacity
FK Baku	Tofik Bakhramov Stadium	29,858
Gabala	Gabala City Stadium	2,000
Gänclärbirliyi Sumqayit	Mehdi Huseynzade Stadium	15,350
Inter Baku	Shafa Stadium	8,200
Kapaz	Ganja City Stadium	26,120
Karabakh	Guzanli Olympic Stadium^{1}	15,000
Karvan	Yevlakh Stadium	5,000
Khazar Lankaran	Lankaran City Stadium	15,000
MKT Araz	Heydar Aliyev Stadium	8,500
Neftchi Baku	Tofik Bakhramov Stadium	29,858
Olimpik Baku	Shafa Stadium	8,200
Shahdag Qusar	Shovkat Ordukhanov Stadium	5,000
Simurq Zaqatala	Zaqatala City Stadium	4,000
Turan Tovuz	Tovuz City Stadium	10,000

^{1}Karabakh played their home matches at Surakhani Stadium in Baku before moving to their current stadium on 3 May 2009.

== League standings ==
Pos	Team	Pld	W	D	L	GF	GA	GD	Pts	Qualification or relegation
1	Khazar Lankaran (C)	24	17	5	2	50	16	+34	56	Qualification for Champions League first qualifying round
2	Neftçi Baku	24	17	3	4	47	15	+32	54	Qualification for UEFA Cup first qualifying round (Note: MKT-Araz qualified for the first qualifying round of the 2005–06 UEFA Cup as winner of the 2004–05 Azerbaijan Cup.)
3	Baku	24	14	6	4	25	10	+15	48	Qualification for Intertoto Cup first round
4	Inter Baku	24	13	6	5	36	12	+24	45	
5	FK MKT-Araz	24	12	5	7	23	18	+5	41	Qualification for UEFA Cup first qualifying round
6	Olimpik Baku	24	11	8	5	28	17	+11	41	
7	Karvan	24	10	5	9	36	30	+6	35	
8	Qarabağ	24	6	9	9	20	27	−7	27	
9	Simurq	24	6	7	11	27	33	−6	25	
10	Turan	24	5	5	14	24	38	−14	20	
11	Gabala	24	4	4	16	17	47	−30	16	
12	Gänclärbirliyi Sumqayit	24	3	3	18	16	54	−38	12	
13	Şahdağ (R)	24	1	8	15	15	47	−32	11	Relegation to Azerbaijan First Division
14	Ganja (R)	0	0	0	0	0	0	0	0	Team excluded (Note: FK Gäncä were excluded from the league due to financial problems.)

Source: Azerbaijan Professional Football league
(C) Champions; (R) Relegated

== Results ==
Home \ Away	ABB	SSQ	BAK	GAB	GAS	INT	KAR	KHA	NEF	OLI	QAR	SIM	TUR
FK MKT-Araz		1–0	2–0	4–1	5–1	0–2	1–0	0–2	1–1	0–0	1–0	1–1	1–0
Şahdağ	0–0		0–0	0–1	3–0	1–5	0–2	1–5	1–1	0–0	0–0	1–3	1–2
Baku	1–0	3–1		1–0	3–0	2–0	2–0	0–0	0–1	1–0	0–0	3–2	2–0
Gabala	0–1	0–0	0–1		2–0	0–0	1–4	0–3	1–4	0–3	0–2	1–2	1–0
Gänclärbirliyi Sumqayit	0–0	1–1	0–1	0–1		0–4	1–0	0–3	0–1	1–1	0–3	4–2	2–0
Inter Baku	0–1	2–1	0–1	2–0	4–1		1–1	0–0	0–1	0–0	1–0	2–0	1–0
Karvan	0–1	3–1	1–2	3–3	3–2	1–1		2–1	0–1	1–0	2–0	3–0	2–1
Khazar Lankaran	4–1	3–1	1–0	4–0	3–1	0–0	3–1		2–1	3–2	2–0	1–1	0–0
Neftçi Baku	3–0	5–0	1–0	4–1	6–1	0–1	3–1	1–0		3–0	0–0	1–0	4–2
Olimpik Baku	1–0	3–1	0–0	3–1	2–0	1–0	1–0	1–2	2–1		0–0	3–0	1–0
Qarabağ	1–0	3–1	1–1	3–2	1–0	0–1	1–1	1–4	0–2	1–1		1–1	1–1
Simurq	0–1	3–0	0–0	3–1	1–0	1–2	1–1	0–1	0–1	2–2	3–0		0–0
Turan	0–1	1–1	0–1	0–0	4–1	1–7	2–4	2–3	2–1	0–1	3–1	3–1	

Source: APL: Yüksək dəstə - 2006-07
Legend: Blue = home team win; Yellow = draw; Red = away team win.

== Season statistics ==
=== Top goalscorers ===
Rank	Player	Club	Goals
1	(Azerbaijan) Zaur Ramazanov	Khazar Lankaran	20
2	(Azerbaijan) Khagani Mammadov	Olimpik-Shuvalan	13
3	(Georgia (country)) Georgi Adamia	Neftchi Baku	10
3	(Azerbaijan) Samir Aliyev	Inter Baku/Neftchi Baku	10
3	(Ivory Coast) Yacouba Bamba	Karvan	10
6	(Nigeria) Victor Igbekoyi	Turan Tovuz	9
6	(Azerbaijan) Nadir Nabiev	Neftchi Baku	9
6	(Azerbaijan) Ramin Nasibov	Simurq	9
9	(Moldova) Anatolie Doroș	MKT Araz	8

=== Hat-tricks ===
Player	For	Against	Result	Date
(Azerbaijan) Samir Musayev	Qarabağ	Şahdağ	3–1	10 August 2006
(Azerbaijan) Samir Aliyev	Inter Baku	Gänclärbirliyi Sumqayit	4–1	22 October 2006
(Azerbaijan) Khagani Mammadov	Olimpik-Shuvalan	Şahdağ	3–1	13 December 2006
(Ukraine) Volodymyr Mazyar	Simurq	Qarabağ	3–0	12 May 2007
(Azerbaijan) Zaur Ramazanov	Khazar Lankaran	Turan Tovuz	3–2	12 May 2006
