= 2004–05 Azerbaijan Top League =

Azerbaijan Top League
- Season: 2004–05
- Champions: Neftchi Baku
- Relegated: Karat Baki; Shamkir; Adliyya Baku; Bakılı Baku; Shafa Baku
- Champions League: Neftchi Baku
- UEFA Cup: Khazar Lankaran; Baku
- Intertoto Cup: Karvan
- Matches played: 306
- Goals scored: 738 (2.41 per match)
- Top goalscorer: Zaur Ramazanov (21)
- Biggest home win: Khazar Lankaran 6-0 Gänclärbirliyi Sumqayit; Adliyya Baku 6-0 MOIK Baku
- Biggest away win: Bakılı 2-7 Baku
- Highest scoring: Bakılı 2-7 Baku

The 2004–05 Azerbaijan Top League was the thirteenth season of the Top League since its establishment in 1992. The season began on 7 August 2004 and finished on 24 May 2005. Neftchi Baku were the defending champions, having won the previous season, and they retained the title after defeating Khazar Lankaran in a playoff after both teams finished level on points and goal difference.

== League table ==
| Pos | Team | Pld | W | D | L | GF | GA | GD | Pts | Qualification or relegation |
|---|---|---|---|---|---|---|---|---|---|---|
| 1 | Neftçi Baku (C) | 34 | 24 | 6 | 4 | 52 | 18 | +34 | 78 | Qualification for Champions League first qualifying round (Note: Neftçi Baku and Khazar Lankaran finished equal on points, and a championship play-off to determine the winner was won by Neftçi Baku.) |
| 2 | Khazar Lankaran | 34 | 24 | 6 | 4 | 68 | 15 | +53 | 78 | Qualification for UEFA Cup first qualifying round |
| 3 | Karvan | 34 | 23 | 7 | 4 | 66 | 18 | +48 | 76 | Qualification for Intertoto Cup first round |
| 4 | Turan | 34 | 22 | 7 | 5 | 64 | 21 | +43 | 73 | |
| 5 | Baku | 34 | 21 | 10 | 3 | 60 | 14 | +46 | 73 | Qualification for UEFA Cup first qualifying round (Note: Baku qualified for the first qualifying round of the 2005–06 UEFA Cup as winner of the 2004–05 Azerbaijan Cup.) |
| 6 | Qarabağ | 34 | 22 | 5 | 7 | 61 | 31 | +30 | 71 | |
| 7 | Inter Baku | 34 | 19 | 9 | 6 | 44 | 24 | +20 | 66 | |
| 8 | FK MKT-Araz | 34 | 16 | 9 | 9 | 35 | 23 | +12 | 57 | |
| 9 | Ganja | 34 | 11 | 9 | 14 | 37 | 37 | 0 | 42 | |
| 10 | Karat Baki (R) | 34 | 12 | 4 | 18 | 40 | 62 | −22 | 40 | Relegation to Azerbaijan First Division |
| 11 | Göyəzən | 34 | 9 | 6 | 19 | 30 | 52 | −22 | 33 | |
| 12 | Gänclärbirliyi Sumqayit | 34 | 9 | 6 | 19 | 32 | 58 | −26 | 33 | |
| 13 | Şəmkir (R) | 34 | 9 | 5 | 20 | 34 | 48 | −14 | 32 | Relegation to Azerbaijan First Division |
| 14 | Şahdağ | 34 | 8 | 8 | 18 | 29 | 51 | −22 | 32 | |
| 15 | MOIK Baku | 34 | 7 | 9 | 18 | 24 | 34 | −10 | 30 | |
| 16 | Adliyya Baku (R) | 34 | 7 | 4 | 23 | 24 | 66 | −42 | 25 | Relegation to Azerbaijan First Division |
| 17 | Bakili (R) | 34 | 3 | 5 | 26 | 22 | 71 | −49 | 14 | Relegation to Azerbaijan First Division |
| 18 | Shafa Baku | 34 | 2 | 1 | 31 | 16 | 95 | −79 | 7 | Team Dissolved (Note: Safa withdrew during the winter break for financial reasons, all their remaining matches have been awarded 0-3 against them.) |

Source: Azerbaijan Professional Football league
Rules for classification: 1) points; 2) goal difference; 3) number of goals scored.
(C) Champions; (R) Relegated

== Results ==
| Home \ Away | ADL | BKL | BAK | GAN | GAS | GÖY | INT | KAB | KAR | KHA | ABB | MOI | NEF | QAR | SHB | ŞAH | SHA | TUR |
|---|---|---|---|---|---|---|---|---|---|---|---|---|---|---|---|---|---|---|
| Adliyya Baku | | 1–0 | 0–6 | 2–1 | 0–0 | 1–0 | 0–1 | 2–3 | 1–3 | 0–2 | 0–1 | 0–6 | 0–2 | 2–1 | 3–0 (Note: Match rated as walkover due to the withdrawal of Shafa Baku.) | 1–1 | 1–1 | 0–1 |
| Bakili | 1–0 | | 2–7 | 2–2 | 2–3 | 1–3 | 1–3 | 1–1 | 0–5 | 1–3 | 0–2 | 0–0 | 0–3 | 0–3 | 0–2 | 1–1 | 0–1 | 1–2 |
| Baku | 4–0 | 2–0 | | 1–0 | 1–0 | 6–0 | 2–0 | 4–2 | 0–0 | 2–0 | 1–0 | 2–0 | 2–0 | 1–1 | 3–0 | 4–1 | 1–0 | 0–0 |
| Ganja | 1–1 | 1–0 | 0–2 | | 6–1 | 3–1 | 0–1 | 4–1 | 0–3 | 0–1 | 0–1 | 1–0 | 0–1 | 0–1 | 3–0 | 2–0 | 1–1 | 0–3 |
| Gänclärbirliyi Sumqayit | 3–1 | 3–1 | 1–1 | 1–1 | | 1–0 | 1–1 | 0–1 | 0–2 | 0–5 | 1–0 | 0–3 | 1–2 | 0–2 | 2–1 | 1–0 | 1–1 | 0–2 |
| Göyazan | 1–0 | 3–1 | 0–0 | 0–2 | 2–1 | | 0–2 | 0–0 | 1–1 | 0–0 | 0–1 | 0–1 | 0–1 | 1–3 | 3–0 | 2–0 | 2–0 | 0–0 |
| Inter Baku | 2–1 | 2–0 | 0–0 | 2–0 | 1–1 | 1–0 | | 2–0 | 0–0 | 1–0 | 0–0 | 1–0 | 2–1 | 1–0 | 3–0 | 2–0 | 2–1 | 4–3 |
| Karat Baki | 1–0 | 3–1 | 0–1 | 2–3 | 0–5 | 2–2 | 3–2 | | 0–2 | 0–2 | 1–0 | 1–0 | 0–4 | 0–3 (Note: Walkover.) | 4–1 | 2–0 | 0–2 | 1–3 |
| Karvan | 1–0 | 3–0 | 0–0 | 1–1 | 3–0 | 4–1 | 2–0 | 2–0 | | 0–1 | 2–0 | 3–0 | 1–1 | 0–1 | 3–0 | 3–0 | 4–1 | 4–3 |
| Khazar Lankaran | 6–1 | 1–0 | 2–0 | 2–0 | 6–0 | 3–0 | 0–0 | 3–0 | 1–0 | | 1–1 | 1–0 | 1–1 | 3–0 | 2–1 | 5–0 | 2–0 | 1–0 |
| FK MKT-Araz | 2–1 | 0–1 | 0–2 | 0–0 | 2–1 | 2–1 | 0–0 | 1–1 | 0–2 | 0–0 | | 1–0 | 0–1 | 1–1 | 3–0 | 3–0 | 2–0 | 1–1 |
| MOIK Baku | 0–2 | 3–1 | 0–0 | 0–0 | 2–0 | 1–2 | 0–0 | 1–3 | 0–2 | 0–1 | 0–1 | | 0–1 | 0–3 | 1–1 | 0–0 | 0–0 | 1–2 |
| Neftçi Baku | 2–0 | 2–0 | 0–0 | 2–0 | 3–0 | 1–0 | 1–1 | 2–0 | 2–1 | 2–1 | 2–2 | 0–0 | | 1–0 | 2–0 | 1–0 | 1–0 | 2–1 |
| Qarabağ | 3–0 | 1–1 | 2–0 | 1–1 | 1–0 | 4–2 | 3–1 | 3–1 | 1–2 | 3–1 | 1–2 | 1–0 | 2–1 | | 3–0 | 2–1 | 3–2 | 1–0 |
| Shafa Baku | 3–1 | 0–3 | 0–3 | 1–3 | 0–3 | 1–2 | 1–4 | 0–3 | 1–2 | 0–3 | 0–2 | 0–3 | 0–3 | 1–5 | | 1–4 | 0–3 | 0–3 |
| Şahdağ | 0–1 | 1–0 | 0–0 | 0–0 | 3–1 | 3–1 | 1–0 | 3–1 | 0–2 | 1–3 | 0–2 | 1–1 | 1–2 | 0–0 | 3–0 | | 0–1 | 0–3 |
| Şəmkir | 3–1 | 3–0 | 0–2 | 0–1 | 1–0 | 2–0 | 1–2 | 1–2 | 1–2 | 0–4 | 0–2 | 0–1 | 1–2 | 1–2 | 3–1 | 2–3 | | 1–1 |
| Turan | 4–0 | 1–0 | 3–0 | 2–0 | 1–0 | 3–0 | 1–0 | 2–1 | 1–1 | 1–1 | 2–0 | 3–0 | 1–0 | 4–0 | 4–0 | 1–1 | 2–0 | |

Source: APL: Yüksək dəstə - 2004-05
Legend: Blue = home team win; Yellow = draw; Red = away team win.

== Championship play-off ==
10 June 2005

| Neftchi Baku | 2 – 1 | Khazar Lankaran |
|---|---|---|
| Abbasov 68'; Tagizade 73' | | Qurbanov 42' |

Shehar Stadium
Attendance: 25,000
Referee: Carlo Bertolini (Switzerland)

== Season statistics ==
=== Top scorers ===
| Rank | Player | Club | Goals |
|---|---|---|---|
| 1 | (Azerbaijan) Zaur Ramazanov | Karvan | 21 |
| 2 | (Azerbaijan) Samir Aliyev | Khazar Lankaran | 20 |
| 3 | (Turkey) Oktay Derelioğlu | Khazar Lankaran | 17 |
| 3 | (Azerbaijan) Farrukh Ismayilov | Karvan | 17 |
| 5 | (Burkina Faso) Issa Nikiema | Gänclärbirliyi Sumqayit | 16 |
| 6 | (Azerbaijan) Kanan Karimov | Turan Tovuz | 15 |
| 7 | (Azerbaijan) Zaur Tagizade | Neftchi Baku | 14 |
| 8 | (Argentina) Fernando Pérez | Baku | 13 |
| 9 | (Brazil) Leandro Gomes | Baku | 12 |
| 9 | (Azerbaijan) Vadim Vasilyev | Qarabağ | 12 |

=== Hat-tricks ===
| Player | For | Against | Result | Date |
|---|---|---|---|---|
| (Senegal) Escort Essong | Şəmkir | Adliyya Baku | 3–1 | 8 August 2004 |
| (Burkina Faso) Issa Nikiema^{4} | Gänclärbirliyi Sumqayit | Karat Baku | 5–0 | 12 August 2004 |
| (Azerbaijan) Samir Musayev | Qarabağ | Göyəzən | 4–2 | 26 September 2004 |
| (Azerbaijan) Zaur Ramazanov | Karvan | Ganja | 3–0 | 26 September 2004 |
| (Azerbaijan) Zaur Ramazanov | Karvan | Turan Tovuz | 4–3 | 17 October 2004 |
| (Azerbaijan) Vadim Vasilyev | Qarabağ | MOIK Baku | 3–0 | 31 October 2004 |
| (Azerbaijan) Samir Aliyev | Khazar Lankaran | Gänclärbirliyi Sumqayit | 6–0 | 3 November 2004 |
| (Georgia (country)) Mikheil Khutsishvili^{4} | Ganja | Gänclärbirliyi Sumqayit | 6–1 | 19 March 2005 |
| (Argentina) Fernando Pérez^{4} | Baku | Göyəzən | 6–0 | 21 April 2005 |
| (Turkey) Oktay Derelioğlu | Khazar Lankaran | Adliyya Baku | 6–1 | 3 May 2005 |
| (Azerbaijan) Shalva Mumladze | Şahdağ | Göyəzən | 3–1 | 15 May 2005 |
| (Azerbaijan) Yashar Abuzerov | Baku | Adliyya Baku | 4–0 | 24 May 2005 |

- ^{4} Player scored 4 goals
