= 2005–06 Azerbaijan Top League =

Azerbaijan Top League
- Season: 2005–06
- Champions: Baku
- Relegated: MOIK Baku, Göyazan Qazax
- Champions League: Baku
- UEFA Cup: Karvan, Karabakh
- Intertoto Cup: MKT-Araz
- Matches played: 182
- Goals scored: 423 (2.32 per match)
- Top goalscorer: Yacouba Bamba (16)
- Biggest home win: Karvan 7 - 1 Gäncä
- Biggest away win: MKT Araz 0 - 5 Neftchi Baku; Gäncä 0 - 5 Neftchi Baku; MOIK Baku 0 - 5 Karvan; Olimpik Baku 0 - 5 Karvan
- Highest scoring: Karvan 7 - 1 Gäncä; Gäncä 5 - 3 MOIK Baku

The 2005–06 Azerbaijan Top League was the fourteenth season of the Top League since its establishment in 1992. The season began on 7 August 2005 and finished on 24 May 2006. Neftchi Baku are the defending champions, having won the previous season.

== Teams ==
=== Stadia and locations ===
Note: Table lists in alphabetical order.

Team	Location	Venue	Capacity
Baku	Baku	Tofig Bahramov Stadium	2,000
Gänclärbirliyi Sumqayit	Sumgayit	Mehdi Huseynzade Stadium	15,350
Göyazan	Qazax	Qazakh City Stadium	3,500
Inter	Baku	Shafa Stadium	8,000
Kapaz	Ganja	Ganja City Stadium	26,120
Karvan	Yevlakh	Yevlakh City Stadium	5,000
Khazar	Lankaran	Lankaran City Stadium	15,000
MKT-Araz	Imishli	Heydar Aliyev Stadium	8,500
MOIK Baku	Baku	Shafa Stadium	8,000
Neftchi	Baku	Tofig Bahramov Stadium	31,200
Olimpik Baku	Baku	Shafa Stadium	8,000
Qarabağ	Aghdam	Tofig Bahramov Stadium	31,200
Shahdag	Qusar	Shovkat Ordukhanov Stadium	5,000
Turan Tovuz	Tovuz	Tovuz City Stadium	6,800

== League table ==
Pos	Team	Pld	W	D	L	GF	GA	GD	Pts	Qualification or relegation
1	Baku (C)	26	18	4	4	42	12	+30	58	Qualification for Champions League first qualifying round
2	Karvan	26	17	6	3	50	9	+41	57	Qualification for UEFA Cup first qualifying round (Note: Qarabağ qualified for the first qualifying round of the 2006–07 UEFA Cup as winner of the 2005–06 Azerbaijan Cup.)
3	Neftçi Baku	26	15	9	2	51	16	+35	54	
4	Inter Baku	26	14	8	4	35	14	+21	50	
5	Qarabağ	26	12	4	10	32	32	0	40	Qualification for UEFA Cup first qualifying round
6	Turan	26	11	5	10	27	21	+6	38	
7	Khazar Lankaran	26	9	9	8	27	18	+9	36	
8	Şahdağ	26	10	5	11	26	36	−10	35	
9	FK MKT-Araz	26	9	8	9	31	36	−5	35	Qualification for Intertoto Cup first round
10	Ganja	26	7	7	12	35	46	−11	28	
11	Gänclärbirliyi Sumqayit	26	6	9	11	25	37	−12	27	
12	Olimpik Baku	26	5	8	13	15	27	−12	23	
13	MOIK Baku (R)	26	2	3	21	13	67	−54	9	Relegation to Azerbaijan First Division
14	Göyəzən (R)	26	0	9	17	14	52	−38	9	Relegation to Azerbaijan First Division

Source: Azerbaijan Professional Football league
Rules for classification: 1) points; 2) goal difference; 3) number of goals scored.
(C) Champions; (R) Relegated

== Results ==
Home \ Away	BAK	GAN	GAS	GÖY	INT	KAR	KHA	ABB	MOI	NEF	OLI	QAR	ŞAH	TUR
Baku		0–0	2–0	3–0	1–0	1–0	1–1	3–0	3–0	2–2	2–0	2–1	0–1	1–0
Ganja	0–2		1–2	3–0	2–2	1–0	1–2	5–0	5–3	0–5	0–1	1–2	3–1	0–0
Gänclärbirliyi Sumqayit	0–2	2–2		2–0	1–2	0–3	0–1	2–3	1–0	1–2	1–3	0–2	3–2	2–2
Göyəzən	1–1	2–2	1–1		1–1	0–2	0–0	1–1	2–2	0–1	2–2	1–3	1–1	1–4
Inter Baku	0–1	5–0	0–0	1–0		2–1	2–0	1–0	3–0	0–1	1–0	2–0	2–1	1–0
Karvan	1–0	7–1	3–1	5–0	0–0		1–0	1–0	5–1	0–0	1–0	1–0	3–0	1–0
Khazar Lankaran	0–1	1–1	0–0	2–0	1–1	0–0		0–0	6–0	0–1	1–0	2–0	1–2	1–0
FK MKT-Araz	2–1	3–1	1–1	2–0	2–2	1–3	2–1		3–1	0–5	0–0	1–0	3–0	0–1
MOIK Baku	0–4	0–3	1–1	1–0	0–3	0–5	0–0	0–3		0–1	0–2	0–2	0–1	1–2
Neftçi Baku	0–1	1–2	1–1	6–0	1–1	0–0	2–2	1–1	4–0		0–0	2–0	3–1	1–0
Olimpik Baku	0–1	1–0	0–1	2–0	0–0	0–5	0–2	0–0	0–1	1–3		1–2	0–0	0–0
Qarabağ	2–4	0–0	1–1	2–1	1–0	0–0	2–1	2–1	2–1	2–2	3–2		0–1	1–0
Şahdağ	0–3	2–0	2–0	1–0	0–2	1–2	0–2	1–1	1–0	1–4	0–0	3–1		0–0
Turan	1–0	2–1	0–1	1–0	0–1	0–0	1–0	3–1	5–1	0–2	1–0	2–1	2–3	

Source: APL: Yüksək dəstə - 2005-06
Legend: Blue = home team win; Yellow = draw; Red = away team win.

== Season statistics ==
=== Top goalscorers ===
Rank	Player	Club	Goals
1	(Ivory Coast) Yacouba Bamba	Karvan	16
2	(Nigeria) Ahmad Tijani	Shahdag Qusar	15
3	(Guinea) Pathé Bangoura	Gänclärbirliyi Sumqayit	12
3	(Azerbaijan) Nadir Nabiyev	Neftchi Baku	12
5	(Serbia and Montenegro) Branimir Subašić	Neftchi Baku	11
6	(Azerbaijan) Samir Musayev	Karabakh	10
7	(Azerbaijan) Samir Aliyev	Khazar Lankaran / Inter Baku	9
7	(Georgia (country)) Irakli Beraia	Gäncä / Karabakh	9
7	(Slovenia) Tomislav Misura	Neftchi Baku	9
10	(Brazil) Junivan	Ganja	8

=== Hat-tricks ===
Player	For	Against	Result	Date
(Azerbaijan) Nadir Nabiyev	Neftchi Baku	Şahdağ	3–1	13 August 2005
(Brazil) Junivan	Turan Tovuz	Göyəzən	4–1	22 August 2005
(Brazil) Junivan	Turan Tovuz	MOIK Baku	4–1	28 August 2005
(Nigeria) Ahmad Tijani	Şahdağ	Qarabağ	3–1	22 October 2005
(Azerbaijan) Nadir Nabiyev	Neftchi Baku	MOIK Baku	3–1	11 March 2006
(Azerbaijan) Samir Aliyev^{4}	Inter Baku	Ganja	3–1	29 March 2006
(Ivory Coast) Yacouba Bamba	Karvan	Göyəzən	5–0	1 April 2006
(Azerbaijan) Samir Musayev	Qarabağ	Göyəzən	5–0	21 April 2006

- ^{4} Player scored 4 goals
