= MOIK Baku =

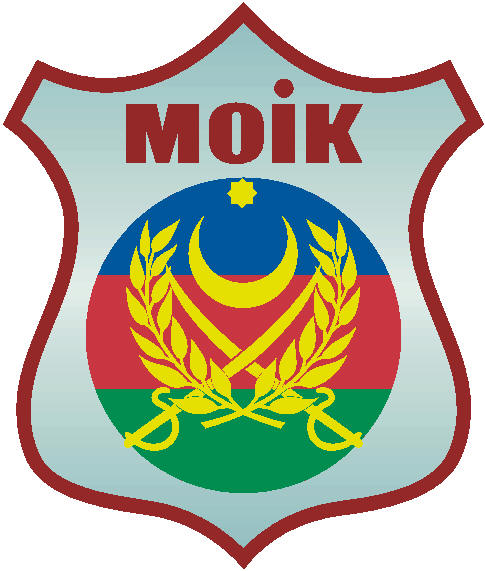
- Full name: Mərkəzi Ordu İdman Klubu
- Nickname: Hərbçilər (troops)
- Founded: 1961; 65 years ago
- Ground: Bine Stadium, Baku, Azerbaijan
- Capacity: 600
- Chairman: Vüqar Əsgərov
- Manager: İlham Yadullayev
- League: Azerbaijan First League
- 2025–26: 6th
Home colours	Away colours

MOIK Baku is an Azerbaijani football club, based in Baku. MOIK was originally built around the concept of military sports club such as CSKA Moscow, CSKA Sofia.

== History ==
The club was established under the name OIK (Azerbaijani: Ordu İdman Klubu; English: Sports Club of Army) in 1961 as sport society of Azerbaijani Armed Forces and was funded by USSR Ministry of Defense until 1990 and Azerbaijan Ministry of Defense since 1993. It has never participated in any Soviet football league, entered Soviet Cup just once and was eliminated in the preliminary round, but has won Azerbaijan USSR League 4 times and Azerbaijan USSR Cup 8 times. MOIK began to participate at Azerbaijan First Division in 1993, making its Azerbaijan Premier League debut in 1995. The club has won Azerbaijan First Division two times. Its best indicator at Azerbaijan Premier League is the 7th place (2001). To the beginning of 2003–04 season the club changed its name into MOIK (Azerbaijani: Mərkəzi Ordu İdman Klubu; English: Central Sports Club of Army).

== Achievements ==
- Azerbaijan USSR League Champions: 4

1962, 1968, 1970, 1979

- Azerbaijan USSR Cup Winner: 8

1962, 1963, 1969, 1970, 1973, 1974, 1976, 1978

- Azerbaijan First Division Winner:

Winners (2): 2000–01, 2018–19

Runners-up (3): 1994–95, 2007–08, 2009–10

== League and domestic cup history ==
Season	Div.	Pos.	Pl.	W	D	L	GS	GA	P	Domestic Cup
1993–94	2nd	4	18	14	2	2	39	12	30	1/16 Finals
1994–95	2nd	2	28	22	2	4	68	21	46	1/16 Finals
1995–96	1st	9	20	5	1	14	16	43	16	1/16 Finals
1996–97	1st	11	30	7	6	17	26	50	27	1/16 Finals
1997–98	1st	7	26	12	7	7	39	29	43	1/8 Finals
1998–99	1st	9	32	8	11	13	28	36	35	1/8 Finals
1999-00	1st	12	22	3	3	16	11	41	12	1/16 Finals
2000–01	2nd	1	22	16	5	1	67	17	53	1/4 Finals
2001–02	1st	7	30	12	4	16	30	43	34	1/8 Finals
2003–04	1st	8	26	7	8	11	25	32	29	1/4 Finals
2004–05	1st	15	34	7	9	18	24	34	30	1/4 Finals
2005–06	1st	13	26	2	3	21	13	67	9	1/16 Finals
2006–07	2nd	9	18	4	3	11	22	37	15	1/16 Finals
2007–08	2nd	2	10	4	5	1	10	6	17	1/16 Finals
2008–09	1st	14	26	1	2	23	12	64	5	1/8 Finals
2009–10	2nd	2	22	15	2	5	48	25	47	1/16 Finals
2010–11	1st	12	32	4	6	22	14	55	18	1/16 Finals
2011–12	2nd	13	26	7	4	15	34	44	25	N/A
2012–13	2nd	5	24	11	6	7	39	28	39	N/A
2013–14	2nd	12	30	7	8	15	37	56	29	First round
2014–15	2nd	12	30	8	5	17	26	60	29	Second round
2015–16	2nd	4	26	14	5	7	53	24	47	First round
2016–17	2nd	8	26	10	6	10	47	31	36	Second round
2017–18	2nd	4	26	21	2	3	51	21	65	Second round
2018–19	2nd	1	27	13	5	9	40	32	44	N/A

== Current squad ==
As of 21 August 2018

Note: Flags indicate national team as defined under FIFA eligibility rules; some limited exceptions apply. Players may hold more than one non-FIFA nationality.

No.	Pos.	Nation	Player
1	GK	AZE	Ismayil Muradov
2	DF	AZE	Ibrahim Sultanov
3	DF	AZE	Nijat Askarov
6	MF	AZE	Tural Mammarzayev
7	FW	AZE	Javidan Shukurov
8	MF	AZE	Vusal Naghiyev
9	FW	AZE	Raul Yagubzade
10	MF	AZE	Orkhan Hasanov (captain)
13	FW	AZE	Ravan Babazade
14	MF	AZE	Ilgar Alakbarov
17	DF	AZE	Yamin Aghakarimzade
20	DF	AZE	Elmir Mammadov
21	MF	AZE	Ruslan Aghalarov
22	DF	AZE	Ilkin Hasanli

No.	Pos.	Nation	Player
25	DF	AZE	Mammad Mammadov
27	DF	AZE	Anar Huseynov
33	DF	AZE	Farid Nadirov
38	MF	AZE	Mubarak Shaguliyev
42	DF	AZE	Ibrahim Gadirzade
44	DF	AZE	Afsar Mammadov
70	MF	AZE	Jeyhun Mukhtarli
77	MF	AZE	Fuad Mammadzade
78	FW	AZE	Nabi Nabizade
94	GK	AZE	Farid Aghayev
97	DF	AZE	Anar Hasanov
98	MF	AZE	Umid Shukurlu
99	FW	AZE	Bahadur Haziyev
