= Karvan İK =

Karvan
- Full name: Karvan İdman Klubu
- Nicknames: Dəvələr (Camels), Qara-Ağlar (Black and Whites)
- Founded: 1990; 36 years ago, as FC Avtomobilchi; 2004; 22 years ago, as FK Karvan; 2022; 4 years ago, as FK Karvan-Yevlakh
- Ground: Yevlakh Stadium
- Capacity: 5,000
- President: Akbar Najafli
- Head coach: Ramiz Mammadov
- League: Azerbaijan Premier League
- 2025–26: Azerbaijan Premier League, 12th of 12 (relegated)
- Website: Official website
Home colours	Away colours

Karvan İdman Klubu (pronounced [carvan]) is an Azerbaijani professional football club based in Yevlakh that participates in the Azerbaijan Premier League after promotion from the Azerbaijan First Division in 2025. It was the first Azerbaijani club to pass the first qualification stage in the UEFA Cup.

== History ==
=== Football in Yevlakh ===
The first football club established in Yevlakh, one of the biggest cities in Azerbaijan, was FC Avtomobilchi, in 1990. The team participated in the Soviet Second League and the Azerbaijan Premier League twice. FC Avtomobilchi was relegated after the 1993–94 season and dissolved. The second football team in Yevlakh was founded 10 years later, in 2004.

=== Golden years ===
Karvan was admitted to the 2004–05 Azerbaijan Top League. The club got off to a good start, finishing third in the 2004–05 season and second in the 2005–06 season. In addition, they reached the national cup final in 2005–06, but lost to FK Karabakh, 2–1. Karvan played in the Intertoto Cup in 2005. In the 2006–07 season the club participated in the UEFA Cup and reached the second qualifying round.

=== Financial difficulties and relegation ===
As management reduced funding, the best players left immediately after coach Yunis Hüseynov's resignation. In the 2007–08 season Karvan finished 11th, and club executives were forced to ask Huseynov to return. In the 2009–10 season, they were relegated to the Azerbaijan First Division. In 2012, the owners announced that the club would be dissolved and not participate in the First Division.

On 21 August 2013, it was announced the club would be reformed and participate in the First Division. Even though, on 18 August 2014, the club again dissolved due to financial problems.

== Stadium ==
Karvan's home ground is Yevlakh Stadium which has a capacity of 5,000.

== League and cup history ==
Season	Div.	Pos.	Pl.	W	D	L	GS	GA	P	Domestic Cup
2004–05	1st	3	34	23	7	4	66	18	76	1/8 Finals
2005–06	1st	2	26	17	6	3	50	9	57	Runners-up
2006–07	1st	7	24	10	5	9	36	30	35	Quarter-finals
2007–08	1st	11	26	6	5	15	23	36	23	1/8 Finals
2008–09	1st	9	26	10	4	12	28	33	34	1/8 Finals
2009–10	1st	12	22	2	5	15	17	36	11	1/8 Finals
2010–11	2nd	8	26	6	8	12	26	40	26	Preliminary Round
2011–12	2nd	3	26	16	7	3	55	22	55	Preliminary Round
2013–14	2nd	8	30	12	6	12	46	56	42	N/A

== European cup history ==
As of December 2008.

Season	Competition	Round	Country	Club	Home	Away	Aggregate
2005	UEFA Intertoto Cup	1R	(Poland)	Lech Poznan	1–2	0–2	1–4
2006–07	UEFA Cup	Q1	(Slovakia)	Spartak Trnava	1–0	1–0	2–0
2006–07	UEFA Cup	Q2	(Czech Republic)	Slavia Praha	0–2	0–0	0–2

== Players ==
=== Current squad ===
As of 29 March, 2026

Note: Flags indicate national team as defined under FIFA eligibility rules; some limited exceptions apply. Players may hold more than one non-FIFA nationality.

No.	Pos.	Nation	Player
1	GK	AZE	Kamran Ibrahimov
2	DF	NED	Shaquill Sno
4	DF	NGA	Olawale Doyeni
5	DF	AZE	Emin Rüstamov (on loan from Sabail)
6	MF	AZE	Vadim Abdullayev
7	MF	AZE	Araz Abdullayev
8	FW	NGA	Peter Kings
10	FW	SRI	Sam Durrant
13	DF	AZE	Vusal Masimov
14	FW	AZE	Ugur Jahangirov
16	MF	AZE	Rauf Rustamli (on loan from Sabah)

No.	Pos.	Nation	Player
17	FW	AZE	Samir Abdullayev
18	MF	AZE	Suleyman Ahmadov
19	MF	NGA	Gavi Thompson
20	FW	RWA	Joy-Slayd Mickels
21	DF	FRA	Imani Barker (on loan from Sumgayit)
25	GK	AZE	Amrah Bulud
32	DF	AZE	Elvin Yunuszade
33	DF	AZE	Eltun Turabov
37	DF	GER	Moise Ngwisani
42	DF	AZE	Ibrahim Qadirzada
77	MF	AZE	Ali Abdullayev
99	GK	STP	Pedro Mateus

== Club officials ==
=== Management ===
Position	Staff
President	(Azerbaijan) Bakhtiyar Hüseynov
Vice-president	(Azerbaijan) Kanan Karimov

=== Coaching staff ===
Position	Name
Head coach	(Azerbaijan) Ramiz Mammadov
Assistant coach	(Azerbaijan) Firuz Gurbanov
Goalkeeping coach	(Azerbaijan) Huseyn Mahammadov

== Coaches ==
- (Azerbaijan) Yunis Huseynov (2004–2005)
- (Turkey) Fuat Yaman (2005)
- (Azerbaijan) Yunis Huseynov (2005–2007)
- (Azerbaijan) Tabriz Hasanov (2007–2008)
- (Azerbaijan) Yunis Huseynov (2008–2010)
- (Azerbaijan) Vidadi Rzayev (2010–2011)
- (Azerbaijan) Zakir Mahmudov (2011–2012)
- (Azerbaijan) Kanan Karimov (2013–2014)
- (Azerbaijan) Kanan Karimov (2021–2025)
- (Azerbaijan) Azer Hashimov (2025)
- (Azerbaijan) Fizuli Mammadov (2025–2026)
- (Azerbaijan) Ramiz Mammadov (2026–)
