= FC Baku =

Baku
- Full name: Bakı Futbol Klubu
- Nickname: Zolaqlılar (The Stripes)
- Founded: 1997 as Dinamo Baku
- Dissolved: 2018
- Ground: FC Baku Training Base, Baku, Azerbaijan
- Capacity: 2,500
Home colours	Away colours	Third colours

FC Baku (Azerbaijani: "Bakı" Futbol Klubu), founded as Dinamo Baku in 1997, was an Azerbaijani football club based in Baku that had been an amateur club since 2016. Prior to that, Baku played 18 seasons in the Azerbaijan Premier League, winning the championship twice and the National Cup three times. The club ceased operations in 2018.

== History ==
=== Early years (1997–2004) ===
Led by Shamil Heydarov, Dinamo finished 2nd and entered the 1998–99 UEFA Cup, but was eliminated by Argeş Piteşti 1–7 on aggregate in the preliminary round. In the 1997–98 season, Dinamo appointed Ruslan Abdullayev as their new head coach. Under the management of Abdullayev, the team passed the first part of the tournament well, although 3rd place and 52 points were not enough for medals or European cups, and Dinamo finished the season in 6th place. The following two seasons, Dinamo also finished 6th, but since 2000, the team was managed by Ruslan Abdullayev's son Elkhan Abdullayev, and was renamed to Dinamo Bakılı. In the 2001–02 season, after a disastrous performance, Dinamo Bakılı were relegated to the Azerbaijan First Division, but due to conflict between clubs and the AFFA, the next championship was only held two years later, in which the team participated under the name of Dinamo for the last time in its history.

=== Success era (2004–2008) ===
In 2004, the club renamed to FC Baku, after changes by the new chairman. New management began from radical changes. Elkhan Abdullayev was replaced by Asgar Abdullayev immediately after the second week of the season. FC Baku gained some important victories over the opponents and was holding a pole position until February 2005. At the end of the season Asgar Abdullayev concentrated on the Azerbaijan Cup, where his team reached the final. In the 2004–05 season, Baku managed to finish in 5th place.

The team's return to European competition proved to be unsuccessful. In the 2004–05 UEFA Cup first qualifying match, Baku lost to Slovak side MŠK Žilina 2–3 on aggregate, although they won the first leg 1–0 in Baku.

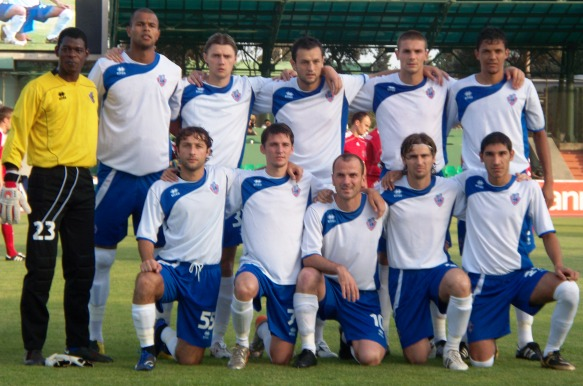
Baku's line up before a 2009–10 UEFA Champions League 2QR match against Ekranas

In 2008, Baku appointed Gjoko Hadžievski as their manager, and after a poor first season, the club celebrated their second title. Under his charge, FC Baku became the first Azerbaijani team to qualify for the third qualifying round of the UEFA Champions League. The team beat FK Ekranas in the second qualifying round after a 2–2 draw in Lithuania and 4–2 win in the Tofik Bakhramov Stadium in the second leg. They lost to Levski Sofia in the next round 2–0 on aggregate, with Baku drawing the first leg 0–0 at home.

=== Downfall and financial struggles (2008–2018) ===
In 2010, the club was handed a two-match suspension by UEFA for fielding Joël Epalle in the first leg of the second qualifying round of the Europa League against FK Budućnost, who was ineligible to play at the time. Baku won the first leg 2–1, but UEFA awarded Budućnost a 3–0 win due to Baku fielding a suspended player. Although Baku went on to win the second leg 2–1, they lost 4–2 on aggregate due to the awarded win.

A long period of decline followed the success of the 2008 to the end of the decade. Despite the appointment of famous names such as Bülent Korkmaz, Winfried Schäfer, Aleksandrs Starkovs, Božidar Bandović and Milinko Pantić, the club did not achieve any success and squandered large sums of money on unsuccessful signings.

In 2014, the club owner Hafiz Mammadov's financial difficulties forced number of players and personnel to seek new clubs, leaving the club's future uncertain. The club was relegated from the Premier League in the 2014–15 season, and played in the Azerbaijani First Division in the 2015–16 season. The club became defunct as a professional club the next year.

== Colours and logo ==
The club's traditional kit is a white and blue shirt, white shorts with grey socks. Their away kit is all maroon. Baku's kits are manufactured by Macron. The club sponsored by the Baghlan Group and ZQAN Holding. The club's logo is based on The Maiden Tower, a noted landmark and one of Azerbaijan's most distinctive emblems.

== Stadium ==
Tofik Bakhramov Stadium was used for a long period of time as Baku's main stadium. In 2008, Baku's president Hafiz Mammadov announced that a new stadium which will have a capacity of 10,000 fans will be built. The new stadium was expected to be finished in 2010, but construction is currently on hold.

The club's training base is currently used for its domestic games, which holds 2,000 fans.

== Supporters ==
The club enjoys support from fans scattered all over the city, and the local area in general. The club has been the subject of an independent supporters' fanzine Toplu Bakı since the 2010s.

== League and domestic cup history ==
=== Post-independence period ===
Season	League									Azerbaijan Cup	Top goalscorer	
Season	Div.	Pos.	Pl.	W	D	L	GS	GA	P	Azerbaijan Cup	Name	League
1997–98	1st	2	26	16	6	4	48	20	54		(Azerbaijan) Ismayilov	14
1998–99	1st	6	36	18	5	13	54	34	59	Semi-finals	(Azerbaijan) Ismayilov	15
1999–00	1st	6	22	9	4	9	21	17	31	Quarter-finals	(Azerbaijan) P.Aliyev	8
2000–01	1st	6	20	9	2	9	30	29	29	Semi-finals	(Azerbaijan) P.Aliyev	13
2001–02	1st	11	30	0	4	26	17	70	4	1/8 Finals		
2003–04	1st	5	26	12	5	9	45	32	41	1/8 Finals	(Azerbaijan) Mahmudov	10
2004–05	1st	5	34	21	10	3	60	14	73	Winners	(Argentina) Pérez	13
2005–06	1st	1	26	18	4	4	42	12	58	Quarter-finals	(Azerbaijan) Gomes	8
2006–07	1st	3	24	14	6	4	25	10	48	Quarter-finals	(Azerbaijan) Gomes (Argentina) Pérez	6
2007–08	1st	8	26	8	11	7	35	26	35	Quarter-finals	(Argentina) Pérez	8
2008–09	1st	1	26	20	2	4	54	13	62	Semi-finals	(Georgia (country)) Mujiri	11
2009–10	1st	2	42	17	14	11	41	32	65	Winners	(Brazil) Jabá	10
2010–11	1st	6	32	10	10	12	33	32	40	Semi-finals	(Brazil) Jabá	7
2011–12	1st	6	32	15	5	12	42	37	50	Winners	(Costa Rica) Parks	8
2012–13	1st	5	32	9	14	9	33	27	41	Semi-finals	(Romania) Pena	6
2013–14	1st	5	36	16	9	11	53	43	57	Quarter-finals	(Azerbaijan) R.Aliyev	9
2014–15	1st	9	32	3	8	21	19	68	17	Quarter-finals	(Azerbaijan) N.Novruzov	15
2015–16	2nd	14	26	9	3	14	33	42	15	Second round	(Azerbaijan) K.Nurahmedov	8

== European record ==
Updated 21 July 2009.

Competition	Matches	W	D	L	GF	GA
UEFA Champions League	6	2	2	2	7	8
UEFA Cup/UEFA Europa League	10	2	1	7	7	24
UEFA Intertoto Cup	2	0	2	0	2	2
Total	18	4	5	9	16	34

Season	Competition	Round		Club	Home	Away	Aggregate
1998–99	UEFA Cup	1Q	(Romania)	Argeş Piteşti	0–2	1–5	1–7
2005–06	UEFA Cup	1Q	(Slovakia)	MŠK Žilina	1–0	1–3	2–3
2006–07	Champions League	1Q	(Georgia (country))	Sioni Bolnisi	1–0	0–2	1–2
2007	UEFA Intertoto Cup	1Q	(Moldova)	Dacia Chișinău	1–1	1–1 (p 1–3)	2–2
2009–10	Champions League	2QR	(Lithuania)	FK Ekranas	4–2	2–2	6–4
2009–10	Champions League	3QR	(Bulgaria)	Levski Sofia	0–0	0–2	0–2
2009–10	UEFA Europa League	PO	(Switzerland)	FC Basel	1–3	1–5	2–8
2010–11	UEFA Europa League	2QR	(Montenegro)	FK Budućnost	0–3 (Note: UEFA awarded Budućnost Podgorica a 3–0 win due to Baku fielding a suspended player. The original match had ended in a 2–1 win for Baku.)	2–1	2–4
2012–13	UEFA Europa League	1QR	(Slovenia)	ND Mura 05	0–0	0–2	0–2

== Notable managers ==
The following managers have all won at least one trophy when in charge of FC Baku:

Name	Period	Trophies
(Azerbaijan) Asgar Abdullayev	2004–06	Azerbaijan Cup
(Azerbaijan) Boyukagha Hajiyev	2006–07	Azerbaijan Premier League
(North Macedonia) Gjoko Hadžievski	2007–10	Azerbaijan Premier League
(Turkey) Cüneyt Biçer	2010	Azerbaijan Cup
(Azerbaijan) Novruz Azimov	2012	Azerbaijan Cup

== Honours ==
- Azerbaijan League
  - Champions (2): 2005–06, 2008–09
- Azerbaijan Cup
  - Winners (3): 2004–05, 2009–10, 2011–12
