= 2008–09 FK Baku season =

Baku
2008-09 season
- President: Hafiz Mammadov
- Manager: Gjoko Hadžievski
- Stadium: Tofig Bakhramov Stadium
- Premier League: 1st
- Azerbaijan Cup: Semifinals vs Qarabağ
- Top goalscorer: League: Amiran Mujiri (11); All: Amiran Mujiri (11)
Home colours	Away colours	Third colours

The FK Baku 2008-09 season was Baku's 11th Azerbaijan Premier League season, and was their second season with Gjoko Hadžievski as their manager, having replaced Boyukagha Hajiyev in July 2007. They finished the season in 1st place in the league and were knocked out of the Azerbaijan Cup at the Semi-final stage by Qarabağ.

== Squad ==
Note: Flags indicate national team as defined under FIFA eligibility rules; some limited exceptions apply. Players may hold more than one non-FIFA nationality.

No.	Pos.	Nation	Player
1	GK	CRO	Marko Šarlija
2	FW	SEN	Papa Biaye Çeikouna
3	DF	AZE	Rafael Amirbekov
4	MF	MDA	Vadim Borets
5	DF	BUL	Stanislav Bachev
7	MF	AZE	Mahmud Gurbanov
8	MF	CRO	Ernad Skulić
9	FW	GEO	Giorgi Demetradze
10	MF	GEO	Amiran Mujiri
11	FW	MKD	Dragan Nacevski
12	FW	ARG	Fernando Perez
13	GK	AZE	Aqil Mammadov
14	DF	AZE	Elvin Aliyev
15	MF	AZE	Jemshid Maharramov
17	MF	AZE	Ramazan Abbasov

No.	Pos.	Nation	Player
18	DF	BDI	Floribert Ndayisaba
19	FW	NGR	Ahmad Tijani
20	MF	AZE	Fabio
21	DF	BUL	Aleksandar Tomash
22	DF	AZE	Sabuhi Hasanov
23	GK	SEN	Kalidou Cissokho
25	FW	TUR	Sınan Demırcan
27	FW	AZE	Bakhtiyar Soltanov
30	FW	BRA	William Batista (on loan from FC Kharkiv)
32	MF	MDA	Alexei Savinov
33	DF	AZE	Saşa Yunisoğlu
55	FW	GEO	Giorgi Adamia
99	FW	MAR	Hassan Souari
—	FW	BRA	Bruno Bastelli
37	DF	AZE	Vuqar Beybalayev

== Transfers ==
=== Summer ===
In: Note: Flags indicate national team as defined under FIFA eligibility rules; some limited exceptions apply. Players may hold more than one non-FIFA nationality.

No.	Pos.	Nation	Player
1	GK	CRO	Marko Šarlija (from (Croatia) NK Inter Zapresic)
4	MF	MDA	Vadim Borets (from (Azerbaijan) Neftchi Baku)
9	FW	GEO	Giorgi Demetradze (from (Ukraine) Arsenal Kiew)
11	FW	MKD	Dragan Načevski (from (Greece) AO Kerkyra)
18	DF	BDI	Floribert Ndayisaba (from (Burundi) Vital`O)
21	DF	BUL	Aleksandar Tomas (from (Bulgaria) Cherno More Varna)
20	MF	AZE	Fabio Luis Ramim (from (Azerbaijan) FK Olimpik Baku)
32	MF	MDA	Alexei Savinov (from (Moldova) Zimbru Chişinău)
55	FW	GEO	Giorgi Adamia (from (Azerbaijan) Neftchi Baku)
—	FW	MKD	Georgi Hristov (from (Netherlands) Den Bosch)

Out: Note: Flags indicate national team as defined under FIFA eligibility rules; some limited exceptions apply. Players may hold more than one non-FIFA nationality.

No.	Pos.	Nation	Player
2	DF	AZE	Andrezinho
5	MF	AZE	Ilgar Abdurahmanov (to (Azerbaijan) Mughan)
6	DF	AZE	Vugar Guliev
7	DF	AZE	Asif Abbasov
8	MF	BUL	Asen Nikolov (to (Azerbaijan) Gabala)
14	MF	GEO	Aleksandr Gogoberishvili (to (Azerbaijan) Qarabağ)
16	FW	AZE	Farid Guliyev (loan to (Azerbaijan) Mughan)
18	DF	AZE	Hafiz Aliyev (to (Azerbaijan) Bakılı)
19	DF	SRB	Bojan Ilić (to (Azerbaijan) Bakılı)
20	MF	AZE	Elnur Abbasov
22	MF	AZE	Vasif Aliyev
25	GK	AZE	Orkhan Mirzaev
26	MF	AZE	Tarlan Khalilov (to (Azerbaijan) Mughan)
27	FW	AZE	Emin Amiraslanov (to (Azerbaijan) Gänclärbirliyi Sumqayit)
55	FW	AZE	Leandro Gomes (to (Azerbaijan) FK Olimpik Baku)
—	DF	AZE	Elnur Yusifov
—	FW	AZE	Anatoli Ponomarev (loan return to (Sweden) Östers IF)
—	FW	MKD	Cvetan Curlinov (to (North Macedonia) Kožuf)
—	FW	SEN	Ely Cissé (to (Morocco) MAS Fez)

=== Winter ===
In: Note: Flags indicate national team as defined under FIFA eligibility rules; some limited exceptions apply. Players may hold more than one non-FIFA nationality.

No.	Pos.	Nation	Player
17	MF	AZE	Ramazan Abbasov (from (Azerbaijan) Neftchi Baku)
30	FW	BRA	William Batista (loan from (Ukraine) Kharkiv)
55	FW	GEO	Georgi Adamia (from (Azerbaijan) Neftchi Baku)
99	FW	MAR	Hassan Souari (from (Morocco) Khouribga)

Out: Note: Flags indicate national team as defined under FIFA eligibility rules; some limited exceptions apply. Players may hold more than one non-FIFA nationality.

No.	Pos.	Nation	Player
6	MF	SRB	Dejan Branković (to (Finland) JJK)
—	DF	AZE	Elnur Abdullayev (to (Azerbaijan) Mughan)
—	MF	AZE	Ramal Huseynov (loan to (Turkey) Kocaelispor)
—	FW	MKD	Georgi Hristov

== Competitions ==
=== Azerbaijan Premier League ===
==== Results summary ====
Overall								Home						Away					
Pld	W	D	L	GF	GA	GD	Pts	W	D	L	GF	GA	GD	W	D	L	GF	GA	GD
26	20	2	4	54	13	+41	62	10	2	1	28	5	+23	10	0	3	26	8	+18

Last updated: 8 May 2013.
Source: Soccerway

==== Results ====
10 August 2008 1	Baku	1 - 0	MOIK Baku	Baku
20:00 AZST (UTC+5)	Tijani 90'	Summary		Stadium: Tofig Bakhramov Stadium

16 August 2008 2	Neftchi Baku	0 - 1	Baku	Baku
21:00 AZST (UTC+5)		Summary	Pérez 48'	Stadium: Tofig Bakhramov Stadium

24 August 2008 3	Baku	0 - 0	Inter Baku	Baku
21:00 AZST (UTC+5)		Summary		Stadium: Tofig Bakhramov Stadium

30 August 2008 4	Qarabağ	0 - 2	Baku	Baku^{2}
18:00 AZST (UTC+5)		Summary	Hristov 5'; Fabio 78'	Stadium: Tofiq Bahramov Stadium

21 September 2008 5	Baku	0 - 3	Karvan	Baku
18:00 AZST (UTC+5)		Summary	Nadirov 10'; Aliyev 55'; Doroș 77'	Stadium: Tofig Bakhramov Stadium

28 September 2008 6	Bakili Baku	0 - 7	Baku	Baku
15:00 AZST (UTC+5)		Summary	Mujiri 34', 38'; Fabio 45' (pen.); Nacevski 61'; Bachev 65'; Tijani 79'; Demetradze 90'	Stadium: Shafa Stadium

4 October 2008 7	Baku	3 - 1	Olimpik Baku	Baku
17:15 AZST (UTC+5)	Mujiri 41' (pen.); Tijani 67'; Fabio 87'	Summary	Lascencov 14' (pen.)	Stadium: Tofig Bakhramov Stadium

18 October 2008 8	Baku	2 - 0	Standard Baku	Baku
16:00 AZST (UTC+5)	Mujiri 49'; Nacevski 90'	Summary		Stadium: Tofik Bakhramov Stadium

26 October 2008 9	Baku	0 - 0	Khazar Lankaran	Baku
18:00 AZST (UTC+5)		Summary		Stadium: Tofik Bakhramov Stadium

9 November 2008 10	Baku	3 - 0	Gabala	Baku
15:00 AZT (UTC+4)	Pérez 21'; Mujiri 54' (pen.), 74'	Summary		Stadium: Tofig Bakhramov Stadium

16 November 2008 11	Simurq	2 - 1	Baku	Zaqatala
18:00 AZT (UTC+4)	Makhviladze 9'; Artiukh 45'	Summary	Demetradze 90'	Stadium: Zaqatala City Stadium

22 November 2008 12	Baku	7 - 0	Turan Tovuz	Baku
14:15 AZT (UTC+4)	Mujiri 21' (pen.), 40'; Pérez 23', 31'; Fabio 35'; Soltanov 56', 86'	Summary		Stadium: Tofig Bakhramov Stadium

29 November 2008 13	Mughan^{1}	0 - 4	Baku	Salyan
14:00 AZT (UTC+4)		Summary	Nacevski 43'; Soltanov 67', 90'; Savinov 78'	Stadium: Salyany Olympic Sport Complex Stadium

14 February 2009 14	MOIK Baku	0 - 3	Baku	Baku
14:00 AZST (UTC+5)		Summary	Nacevski 30'; Pérez 46'; Fabio 70'	Stadium: Shafa Stadium

21 February 2009 15	Baku	2 - 0	Neftchi Baku	Baku
16:00 AZT (UTC+4)	Mujiri 48'; Batista 76'	Summary		Stadium: Tofig Bakhramov Stadium

28 February 2009 16	Inter Baku	0 - 1	Baku	Baku
15:00 AZST (UTC+5)		Summary	Pérez 22'	Stadium: Shafa Stadium

7 March 2009 17	Baku	2 - 0	Qarabağ	Baku
17:00 AZT (UTC+4)	Mujiri 66'; Batista 85'	Summary		Stadium: Tofig Bakhramov Stadium

15 March 2009 18	Karvan	0 - 1	Baku	Yevlakh
15:00 AZT (UTC+4)		Summary	Fabio 77'	Stadium: Yevlakh Stadium

21 March 2009 19	Baku	3 - 1	Bakili Baku	Baku
14:00 AZT (UTC+4)	Soltanov 3', 16', 32'	Summary	Guliyev 68'	Stadium: Tofig Bakhramov Stadium

5 April 2009 20	Olimpik Baku	2 - 1	Baku	Lankaran
16:00 AZST (UTC+5)	Junivan 51'; Gomes 74'	Summary	Tijani 12'	Stadium: Lankaran City Stadium

11 April 2009 21	Standard Baku	1 - 2	Baku	Baku
18:00 AZST (UTC+5)	Rodrigo 75' (pen.)	Summary	Adamia 18'; Fabio 38'	Stadium: Shafa Stadium

18 April 2009 22	Khazar Lankaran	3 - 0	Baku	Lankaran
18:00 AZST (UTC+5)	Dursun 34', 75'; Mario Sergio 90'	Summary		Stadium: Lankaran City Stadium

26 April 2009 23	Gabala	0 - 1	Baku	Qabala
16:00 AZST (UTC+5)		Summary	Batista 74'	Stadium: Gabala City Stadium

2 May 2009 24	Baku	1 - 0	Simurq	Baku
18:00 AZST (UTC+5)	Borets 90'	Summary		Stadium: Tofig Bakhramov Stadium

9 May 2009 25	Turan Tovuz	0 - 2	Baku	Tovuz
17:00 AZST (UTC+5)		Summary	Pérez 39'; Batista 43'	Stadium: Tovuz City Stadium

17 May 2009 26	Baku	4 - 0	Mughan^{1}	Baku
18:00 AZST (UTC+5)	Batista 37'; Adamia 45'; Tijani 86', 87'	Summary		Stadium: Tofig Bakhramov Stadium

==== Table ====
Pos	Team	Pld	W	D	L	GF	GA	GD	Pts	Qualification or relegation
1	Baku (C)	26	20	2	4	54	13	+41	62	Qualification for Champions League second qualifying round
2	Inter Baku	26	18	7	1	54	16	+38	61	Qualification for Europa League first qualifying round
3	Simurq	26	16	5	5	39	20	+19	53	Qualification for Europa League first qualifying round
4	Khazar Lankaran	26	15	5	6	49	21	+28	50	
5	Qarabağ	26	14	7	5	35	22	+13	49	Qualification for Europa League second qualifying round (Note: Karabakh won the 2008–09 Azerbaijan Cup and therefore qualified for the second qualifying round of the UEFA Europa League.)

Source: Soccerway.com
Rules for classification: 1) points; 2) goal difference; 3) number of goals scored.
(C) Champions

=== Azerbaijan Cup ===
30 October 2008 Round of 16 1st leg	Baku	10 - 0	Qafqaz Universiteti	Baku
15:00 AZST (UTC+5)	Tijani 25'; Demetradze 35', 75', 78'; Bachev 37'; Bastelli 53'; Skulić 82'; Hristov 85', 90'; Abbasov 89'	Summary		Stadium: Tofig Bakhramov Stadium

6 November 2008 Round of 16 2nd leg	Qafqaz Universiteti	0 - 3 (0 - 13 agg.)	Baku	Baku
14:00 AZST (UTC+5)		Summary	Huseynov 50'; Nacevski 75', 77'

25 February 2009 Quarterfinals 1st Leg	Khazar Lenkoran	0 - 1	Baku	Lankaran
18:00 AZT (UTC+4)		Summary	Tijani 49'; Tomas (red card) 90'	Stadium: Lankaran City Stadium

11 March 2009 Quarterfinals 2nd Leg	Baku	2 - 2 (3 - 2 agg.)	Khazar Lenkoran	Baku
14:00 AZT (UTC+4)	Adamia 68'; Yunisoğlu 90'	Summary	Cvetkov 28', 67'	Stadium: Tofig Bakhramov Stadium

29 April 2009 Semifinals 1st leg	Baku	1 - 2	Qarabağ	Baku
18:00 AZST (UTC+5)	Fabio 90'	Summary	Allahverdiyev 57'; Javadov 67'	Stadium: Tofig Bakhramov Stadium

6 May 2009 Semifinals 2nd leg	Qarabağ	2 - 1 (4 - 2 agg.)	Baku	Baku^{2}
16:00 AZST (UTC+5)	Javadov 43'; Şahin 66'	Summary	Pérez 32'	Stadium: Tofiq Bahramov Stadium

== Squad statistics ==
=== Appearances and goals ===
No.	Pos	Nat	Player	Total		Premier League		Azerbaijan Cup	
No.	Pos	Nat	Player	Apps	Goals	Apps	Goals	Apps	Goals
1	GK	(Croatia) CRO	Marko Šarlija	8	0	8	0	0	0
3	DF	(Azerbaijan) AZE	Rafael Amirbekov	20	0	20	0	0	0
4	MF	(Moldova) MDA	Vadim Borets	22	1	22	1	0	0
5	DF	(Bulgaria) BUL	Stanislav Bachev	11	1	11	1	0	0
7	MF	(Azerbaijan) AZE	Mahmud Gurbanov	13	0	13	0	0	0
8	MF	(Croatia) CRO	Ernad Skulić	25	0	25	0	0	0
9	FW	(Georgia (country)) GEO	Giorgi Demetradze	10	2	10	2	0	0
10	MF	(Georgia (country)) GEO	Amiran Mujiri	22	11	22	11	0	0
11	MF	(North Macedonia) MKD	Dragan Nacevski	19	4	19	4	0	0
12	FW	(Argentina) ARG	Fernando Pérez	21	7	21	7	0	0
14	DF	(Azerbaijan) AZE	Elvin Aliyev	20	0	20	0	0	0
15	MF	(Azerbaijan) AZE	Jemshid Maharramov	22	0	22	0	0	0
17	MF	(Azerbaijan) AZE	Ramazan Abbasov	7	0	7	0	0	0
19	FW	(Nigeria) NGR	Ahmad Tijani	18	6	18	6	0	0
20	MF	(Azerbaijan) AZE	Fabio Luis Ramim	22	7	22	7	0	0
21	DF	(Bulgaria) BUL	Aleksandar Tomash	16	0	16	0	0	0
22	DF	(Azerbaijan) AZE	Sabuhi Hasanov	3	0	3	0	0	0
23	GK	(Senegal) SEN	Kalidou Cissokho	18	0	18	0	0	0
23	FW	(Azerbaijan) AZE	Bakhtiyar Soltanov	7	7	7	7	0	0
30	FW	(Brazil) BRA	William Batista	8	5	8	5	0	0
32	MF	(Moldova) MDA	Alexei Savinov	17	1	17	1	0	0
33	DF	(Azerbaijan) AZE	Saşa Yunisoğlu	6	0	6	0	0	0
55	FW	(Georgia (country)) GEO	Giorgi Adamia	12	2	12	2	0	0
99	MF	(Azerbaijan) AZE	Rahman Hajiyev	1	0	1	0	0	0
Players who appeared for Baku who left on loan during the season:
	MF	(Azerbaijan) AZE	Ramal Huseynov	5	0	5	0	0	0
Players who appeared for Baku who left during the season:
6	MF	(Serbia) SRB	Dejan Branković	3	0	3	0	0	0
	FW	(North Macedonia) MKD	Georgi Hristov	6	0	6	0	0	0

=== Goal scorers ===
Place	Position	Nation	Number	Name	Premier League	Azerbaijan Cup	Total
1	MF	(Georgia (country))	10	Amiran Mujiri	11	0	11
2	MF	(Azerbaijan)	20	Fabio Luis Ramim	7	1	8
2	FW	(Argentina)	12	Fernando Pérez	7	1	8
4	FW	(Nigeria)	18	Ahmad Tijani	6	2	8
5	FW	(Azerbaijan)	27	Bakhtiyar Soltanov	7	0	7
6	FW	(North Macedonia)	11	Dragan Nacevski	4	2	6
7	FW	(Brazil)	30	William Batista	5	0	5
7	FW	(Georgia (country))	9	Giorgi Demetradze	2	3	5
9	FW	(Georgia (country))	55	Giorgi Adamia	2	1	3
10	FW	(North Macedonia)		Georgi Hristov	0	2	2
10	DF	(Bulgaria)	5	Stanislav Bachev	1	1	1
12	MF	(Moldova)	4	Vadim Borets	1	0	1
12	MF	(Moldova)	32	Alexei Savinov	1	0	1
12	DF	(Azerbaijan)	33	Saşa Yunisoğlu	0	1	1
12	MF	(Croatia)	8	Ernad Skulić	0	1	1
12	MF	(Azerbaijan)	17	Ramazan Abbasov	0	1	1
12	MF	(Azerbaijan)		Ramal Huseynov	0	1	1
12	FW	(Brazil)		Bruno Bastelli	0	1	1
				TOTALS	54	18	72

== Notes ==
- On 31 October 2008, FK NBC Salyan changed their name to FK Mughan.
- Qarabağ have played their home games at the Tofiq Bahramov Stadium since 1993 due to the ongoing situation in Quzanlı.
