= 2007–08 FK Baku season =

Baku
2007-08 season
- President: Hafiz Mammadov
- Manager: Gjoko Hadžievski
- Stadium: Tofig Bakhramov Stadium
- Premier League: 8th
- Azerbaijan Cup: Quarterfinals vs Gabala
- Intertoto Cup: First Round vs Dacia Chișinău
- Top goalscorer: Fernando Néstor Pérez (8)
Home colours	Away colours	Third colours

The FK Baku 2007-08 season was Baku's tenth Azerbaijan Premier League season, and was their first season with Gjoko Hadžievski as their manager, having replaced Boyukagha Hajiyev in July 2007. They finished the season in 8th place in the league and were knocked out of the Azerbaijan Cup at the Quarterfinal stage by Gabala.

== Squad ==
Note: Flags indicate national team as defined under FIFA eligibility rules; some limited exceptions apply. Players may hold more than one non-FIFA nationality.

No.	Pos.	Nation	Player
2	DF	AZE	Andrezinho
3	DF	AZE	Rafael Amirbekov
5	DF	AZE	Ilgar Abdurahmanov
6	DF	AZE	Vugar Guliev
7	DF	AZE	Asif Abbasov
8	MF	BUL	Asen Nikolov
10	MF	GEO	Amiran Mujiri
12	FW	ARG	Fernando Nestor Pérez
14	MF	GEO	Aleksandr Gogoberishvili
15	MF	AZE	Jamshid Maharramov
16	FW	AZE	Farid Guliev
17	FW	NGR	Ahmad Tijani
18	MF	AZE	Hafiz Aliyev
19	DF	SRB	Bojan Ilić
20	MF	AZE	Elnur Abbasov
22	MF	AZE	Vasif Aliyev
23	GK	SEN	Khalidou Sissokho

No.	Pos.	Nation	Player
25	GK	AZE	Orkhan Mirzaev
26	MF	AZE	Tarlan Khalilov
27	FW	AZE	Emin Amiraslanov
55	FW	AZE	Leandro Gomes
67	MF	AZE	Ramal Huseynov
77	MF	AZE	Elnur Abdullaev
—	GK	AZE	Aqil Mammadov
—	DF	AZE	Sabuhi Hasanov
—	DF	AZE	Elnur Yusifov
—	DF	BUL	Stanislav Bachev
—	DF	SRB	Dejan Branković
—	MF	CRO	Ernad Skulić
—	FW	AZE	Anatoli Ponomarev (loan from Östers IF)
—	FW	AZE	Bakhtiyar Soltanov
—	FW	MKD	Cvetan Čurlinov
—	FW	SEN	Ely Cissé

== Transfers ==
=== Summer ===
In: Note: Flags indicate national team as defined under FIFA eligibility rules; some limited exceptions apply. Players may hold more than one non-FIFA nationality.

No.	Pos.	Nation	Player
5	DF	AZE	Ilgar Abdurahmanov (from (Azerbaijan) Simurq)
8	MF	BUL	Asen Nikolov (from (Serbia) Partizan)
9	FW	PAR	Israel Rodríguez (from (Paraguay) Sportivo Luqueño)
15	MF	AZE	Jamshid Maharramov (from (Azerbaijan) Karvan)
17	FW	NGR	Ahmad Tijani (from (Azerbaijan) Shahdag)
19	DF	SRB	Bojan Ilic (from (Azerbaijan) Qarabağ)
22	FW	AZE	Vasif Aliyev (from (Azerbaijan) Gabala)
—	DF	BUL	Stanislav Bachev (from (Bulgaria) Marek Dupnitsa)
—	DF	CMR	Hiobi Hiobi Willy Jackson (from (Cameroon) Tonnerre Kalara Club de Yaoundé)
—	FW	AZE	Bakhtiyar Soltanov (Youth Team)

Out: Note: Flags indicate national team as defined under FIFA eligibility rules; some limited exceptions apply. Players may hold more than one non-FIFA nationality.

No.	Pos.	Nation	Player
—	DF	AZE	Rail Malikov (to (Azerbaijan) Neftchi Baku)
—	DF	AZE	Ramin Guliv (to (Azerbaijan) Neftchi Baku)
—	MF	AZE	Jeyhun Sultanov (to (Azerbaijan) Khazar Lankaran)
—	MF	AZE	Ilgar Guliev
—	MF	SRB	Darko Jovandić (to (Serbia) Banat Zrenjanin)
—	FW	AZE	Ramazan Abbasov (to (Azerbaijan) Neftchi Baku)
—	FW	AZE	Samir Musayev (to (Azerbaijan) Simurq)
—	FW	AZE	Emin Amiraslanov (to (Azerbaijan) Gänclärbirliyi Sumqayit)

=== Winter ===
In: Note: Flags indicate national team as defined under FIFA eligibility rules; some limited exceptions apply. Players may hold more than one non-FIFA nationality.

No.	Pos.	Nation	Player
18	MF	AZE	Hafiz Aliyev (from (Azerbaijan) Turan Tovuz)
—	DF	SRB	Dejan Branković (from (Serbia) OFK Beograd)
—	MF	CRO	Ernad Skulić (from (Croatia) Inter Zaprešić)
—	FW	MKD	Cvetan Čurlinov (from (Lithuania) Žalgiris Vilnius)
—	FW	AZE	Anatoli Ponomarev (loan from (Sweden) Östers IF)
—	FW	SEN	Ely Cissé (from (Turkey) Kasımpaşa)

Out: Note: Flags indicate national team as defined under FIFA eligibility rules; some limited exceptions apply. Players may hold more than one non-FIFA nationality.

No.	Pos.	Nation	Player
—	DF	CMR	Hiobi Hiobi Willy Jackson (to (Equatorial Guinea) Deportivo Mongomo)
9	FW	PAR	Israel Rodríguez (to (Azerbaijan) Standard Baku)

== Competitions ==
=== Azerbaijan Premier League ===
==== Results ====
12 August 2007 1	Baku	3 – 1	Gänclärbirliyi Sumqayit	Baku
17:00 AZST (UTC+5)	Khalilov 14'; Mujiri 18'; Pérez 30'	Summary	N.Tagiev 86'	Stadium: Tofig Bakhramov Stadium

19 August 2007 2	Gabala	2 – 0	Baku	Qabala
17:00 AZST (UTC+5)	Balamestny 76'; Aptsiauri 80'	Summary		Stadium: Gabala City Stadium

25 August 2007 3	Baku	0 – 0	Inter Baku	Baku
19:00 AZST (UTC+5)		Summary		Stadium: Tofig Bakhramov Stadium

1 September 2007 4	Standard Baku	1 – 1	Baku	Baku
19:00 AZST (UTC+5)	T.Narimanov 78'	Summary	I.Rodríguez 50'	Stadium: Shafa Stadium

15 September 2007 5	Baku	2 – 1	Masallı	Baku
18:00 AZST (UTC+5)	V.Guliev 85'; Gogoberishvili 87'	Summary	Osmar 55'	Stadium: Tofig Bakhramov Stadium

23 September 2007 6	Baku	5 – 1	Neftchi Baku	Baku
17:00 AZST (UTC+5)	Sadiqov (.)	Summary	Amirbekov (.)	Stadium: Tofig Bakhramov Stadium

30 September 2007 7	Olimpik Baku	3 – 0	Baku	Baku
19:00 AZST (UTC+5)	Junivan 6', 70'; Y.Abuzerov 45'	Summary		Stadium: Shafa Stadium

7 October 2007 8	Baku	1 – 1	Simurq	Baku
17:00 AZST (UTC+5)	Tijani 47'	Summary	R.Hajiyev 23'	Stadium: Tofig Bakhramov Stadium

28 October 2007 9	Karvan	0 – 1	Baku	Yevlakh
22:25 AZST (UTC+5)		Summary	Pérez 51'	Stadium: Yevlakh Stadium

4 November 2007 10	Baku	2 – 2	Khazar Lankaran	Baku
15:00 AZT (UTC+4)	Gomes 41' (pen.); Pérez 56'	Summary	Juninho 4'; Ramazanov 31'	Stadium: Tofig Bakhramov Stadium

10 November 2007 11	Qarabağ	1 – 1	Baku	Baku
15:00 AZT (UTC+4)	Hajiyev 90'	Summary	Tijani 7'	Stadium: Tofiq Bahramov Stadium^{1}

24 November 2007 12	Baku	0 – 0	ABN Bärdä	Baku
15:00 AZT (UTC+4)		Summary		Stadium: Tofig Bakhramov Stadium

2 December 2007 13	Turan Tovuz	0 – 2	Baku	Tovuz
15:00 AZT (UTC+4)		Summary	Pérez 76'; Tijani 83'	Stadium: Tovuz City Stadium

16 February 2008 14	Gänclärbirliyi Sumqayit	0 – 3	Baku	Sumqayit
15:00 AZT (UTC+4)		Summary	Mujiri 14'; Maharramov 57'; Pérez 83'	Stadium: Mehdi Huseynzade Stadium

24 February 2008 15	Baku	3 – 0	Gabala	Baku
15:00 AZT (UTC+4)	Tijani 16'; Cissé 56'; Ponomarev 86'	Summary		Stadium: Tofig Bakhramov Stadium

1 March 2008 16	Inter Baku	1 – 0	Baku	Baku
15:00 AZT (UTC+4)	Zlatinov 90'	Summary		Stadium: Zabrat Stadium

16 March 2008 17	Baku	0 – 1	Standard Baku	Baku
15:00 AZT (UTC+4)		Summary	Gutierrez 9'	Stadium: Tofig Bakhramov Stadium

29 March 2008 19	Neftchi Baku	3 – 2	Baku	Baku
18:00 AZST (UTC+5)	Subašić 3'; Adamia 28'; Kruglov 31'	Summary	Gomes 22'; Pérez 76'	Stadium: Tofiq Bahramov Stadium

6 April 2008 20	Baku	0 – 1	Olimpik Baku	Baku
17:15 AZST (UTC+5)		Summary	S.Musayev 55'	Stadium: Tofig Bakhramov Stadium

13 April 2008 21	Simurq	0 – 0	Baku	Zaqatala
16:00 AZST (UTC+5)		Summary		Stadium: Zaqatala City Stadium

20 April 2008 22	Baku	3 – 3	Karvan	Baku
18:00 AZST (UTC+5)	Cissé 15'; Tijani 27'; Branković 39'	Summary	Camara 13'; Akhalkatsi 30'; Zeynalov 68'	Stadium: Tofig Bakhramov Stadium

26 April 2008 18	Masallı	2 – 0	Baku	Masally
16:00 AZST (UTC+5)	Nadirov 20' (pen.); Dadashev 86'	Summary		Stadium: Anatoly Banishevski Stadium

4 May 2008 23	Khazar Lankaran	0 – 0	Baku	Lankaran
18:00 AZST (UTC+5)		Summary		Stadium: Lankaran City Stadium

12 May 2008 24	Baku	0 – 0	Qarabağ	Baku
18:00 AZST (UTC+5)		Summary		Stadium: Tofig Bakhramov Stadium

17 May 2008 25	ABN Bärdä	0 – 4	Baku	Barda
17:00 AZST (UTC+5)		Summary	Bachev 25'; Cissé 49'; Mujiri 54'; Abdullaev 78'	Stadium: Barda City Stadium

27 May 2008 26	Baku	2 – 2	Turan Tovuz	Baku
17:00 AZST (UTC+5)	Pérez 50', 84'	Summary	Beraia 5', 19'	Stadium: Tofig Bakhramov Stadium

==== Table ====
Pos	Team	Pld	W	D	L	GF	GA	GD	Pts
6	Gabala	26	11	3	12	33	36	−3	36
7	Simurq	26	9	9	8	31	25	+6	36
8	Baku	26	8	11	7	35	26	+9	35
9	Standard Baku	26	8	8	10	36	26	+10	32
10	FK Masallı	26	8	6	12	30	40	−10	30

Source: Azerbaijan Professional Football league
Rules for classification: 1) points; 2) goal difference; 3) number of goals scored.

=== Azerbaijan Cup ===
26 September 2007 1st Round 1st Leg	Standard Baku II	1 – 5	Baku	Baku
		[ Summary]

3 October 2007 1st Round 2nd Leg	Baku	Not Played (5 – 1 agg.)	Standard Baku II	Baku
		[ Summary]		Stadium: Tofig Bakhramov Stadium

24 October 2007 Round of 16 1st Leg	Baku	3 – 0	Inter Baku II	Baku
		[ Summary]		Stadium: Tofig Bakhramov Stadium

30 October 2007 Round of 16 2nd Leg	Inter Baku II	0 – 2 (0 – 5 agg.)	Baku	Baku
		Summary	I.Rodríguez 28'; Mujiri 55'

6 March 2008 Quarterfinals 1st Leg	Baku	1 – 1	Gabala	Baku
	Tijani 28'	Summary; Summary	Zargarov 21'	Stadium: Tofig Bakhramov Stadium

19 March 2008 Quarterfinals 2nd Leg	Gabala	1 – 1 (2 – 2 agg.) (5 – 4 p)	Baku	Qabala
		Summary		Stadium: Gabala City Stadium

=== Intertoto Cup ===
23 June 2007 First round 1st Leg	Baku (Azerbaijan)	1 – 1	(Moldova) Dacia Chișinău	Baku, Azerbaijan
	Andronik 80' (o.g.)	Summary	Onila 45'	Stadium: Tofig Bakhramov Stadium; Referee: Ferenc Bede (Hungary)

30 June 2007 First round 2nd Leg	Dacia Chișinău (Moldova)	1 – 1 (2 – 2 agg.) (3 – 1 p)	(Azerbaijan) Baku	Chișinău, Moldova
	Onila 7'	Summary	Mujiri 64'	Stadium: Zimbru Stadium; Referee: Leontios Trattou (Cyprus)
	Penalties
	Lipa (penalty scored); Orbu (penalty missed); Bolohan (penalty missed); Guşilă (penalty scored); Andronik (penalty scored)		Nikolov (penalty missed); Musayev (penalty scored); Huseynov (penalty missed); Amirbekov (penalty missed)

== Squad statistics ==
=== Appearances and goals ===
No.	Pos	Nat	Player	Total		Premier League		Azerbaijan Cup		Intertoto Cup	
No.	Pos	Nat	Player	Apps	Goals	Apps	Goals	Apps	Goals	Apps	Goals
2	DF	(Azerbaijan) AZE	Andrezinho	13	0	13	0	0	0	0	0
3	DF	(Azerbaijan) AZE	Rafael Amirbekov	25	0	23	0	0	0	2	0
5	DF	(Azerbaijan) AZE	Ilgar Abdurahmanov	9	0	8	0	0	0	1	0
6	DF	(Azerbaijan) AZE	Vugar Guliev	11	1	9	1	0	0	2	0
7	DF	(Azerbaijan) AZE	Asif Abbasov	13	0	11	0	0	0	2	0
8	MF	(Bulgaria) BUL	Asen Nikolov	5	0	4	0	0	0	1	0
10	MF	(Georgia (country)) GEO	Amiran Mujiri	21	4	19	4	0	0	2	0
12	FW	(Argentina) ARG	Fernando Nestor Pérez	24	8	24	8	0	0	0	0
14	MF	(Georgia (country)) GEO	Aleksandr Gogoberishvili	19	1	19	1	0	0	0	0
15	MF	(Azerbaijan) AZE	Jamshid Maharramov	23	1	21	1	0	0	2	0
16	FW	(Azerbaijan) AZE	Farid Guliev	8	0	6	0	0	0	2	0
17	FW	(Nigeria) NGR	Ahmad Tijani	19	7	17	7	0	0	2	0
18	MF	(Azerbaijan) AZE	Hafiz Aliyev	1	0	1	0	0	0	0	0
19	DF	(Serbia) SRB	Bojan Ilic	4	0	3	0	0	0	1	0
20	MF	(Azerbaijan) AZE	Elnur Abbasov	9	0	9	0	0	0	0	0
22	MF	(Azerbaijan) AZE	Vasif Aliyev	1	0	1	0	0	0	0	0
23	GK	(Senegal) SEN	Khalidou Sissokho	25	0	23	0	0	0	2	0
25	GK	(Azerbaijan) AZE	Orkhan Mirzaev	6	0	6	0	0	0	0	0
26	MF	(Azerbaijan) AZE	Tarlan Khalilov	14	1	12	1	0	0	2	0
27	FW	(Azerbaijan) AZE	Emin Amiraslanov	2	0	1	0	0	0	1	0
55	FW	(Azerbaijan) AZE	Leandro Gomes	19	3	19	3	0	0	0	0
67	MF	(Azerbaijan) AZE	Ramal Huseynov	13	0	11	0	0	0	2	0
77	MF	(Azerbaijan) AZE	Elnur Abdullaev	21	1	19	1	0	0	2	0
	GK	(Azerbaijan) AZE	Aqil Mammadov	3	0	3	0	0	0	0	0
	DF	(Azerbaijan) AZE	Sabuhi Hasanov	12	0	12	0	0	0	0	0
	DF	(Azerbaijan) AZE	Elnur Yusifov	2	0	2	0	0	0	0	0
	DF	(Bulgaria) BUL	Stanislav Bachev	11	1	11	1	0	0	0	0
	DF	(Serbia) SRB	Dejan Branković	12	1	12	1	0	0	0	0
	MF	(Croatia) CRO	Ernad Skulić	10	0	10	0	0	0	0	0
	FW	(Azerbaijan) AZE	Anatoli Ponomarev	8	1	8	1	0	0	0	0
	FW	(Azerbaijan) AZE	Bakhtiyar Soltanov	6	0	6	0	0	0	0	0
	FW	(North Macedonia) MKD	Cvetan Čurlinov	1	0	1	0	0	0	0	0
	FW	(Senegal) SEN	Ely Cissé	9	3	9	3	0	0	0	0
Players who appeared for Baku who left on loan during the season:
Players who appeared for Baku who left during the season:
9	FW	(Azerbaijan) AZE	Samir Musayev	2	0	0	0	0	0	2	0
9	FW	(Paraguay) PAR	Israel Rodríguez	8	1	8	1	0	0	0	0

=== Goal scorers ===
Place	Position	Nation	Number	Name	Premier League	Azerbaijan Cup	Intertoto Cup	Total
1	FW	(Argentina)	12	Fernando Nestor Pérez	8	0	0	8
2	FW	(Nigeria)	17	Ahmad Tijani	7	1	0	8
3	MF	(Georgia (country))	10	Amiran Mujiri	4	1	0	5
4	FW	(Azerbaijan)	55	Leandro Gomes	3	0	0	3
4	FW	(Senegal)		Ely Cissé	3	0	0	3
6	FW	(Paraguay)	9	Israel Rodríguez	1	1	0	2
7	MF	(Azerbaijan)	15	Jamshid Maharramov	1	0	0	1
7	MF	(Georgia (country))	14	Aleksandr Gogoberishvili	1	0	0	1
7	MF	(Azerbaijan)	77	Elnur Abdullaev	1	0	0	1
7	DF	(Serbia)		Dejan Branković	1	0	0	1
7	MF	(Azerbaijan)	26	Tarlan Khalilov	1	0	0	1
7	DF	(Bulgaria)		Stanislav Bachev	1	0	0	1
7	DF	(Azerbaijan)	5	Vugar Guliev	1	0	0	1
7	FW	(Azerbaijan)		Anatoli Ponomarev	1	0	0	1
7	FW	(Azerbaijan)	9	Samir Musayev	1	0	0	1
7				Own goal	1	0	1	2
7				Unknown	0	9	0	9
				TOTALS	35	12	2	49

== Notes ==
- Qarabağ have played their home games at the Tofiq Bahramov Stadium since 1993 due to the ongoing situation in Quzanlı.
