= 2010–11 FK Baku season =

Baku
2010-11 season
- President: (Azerbaijan) Hafiz Mammadov
- Manager: (Germany) Winfried Schäfer until 6 January 2011 (Latvia) Aleksandrs Starkovs from 16 January 2011
- Stadium: Tofig Bakhramov Stadium
- Premier League: 6th
- Azerbaijan Cup: Semi-final vs Khazar Lankaran
- Europa League: First Qualifying Round vs (Montenegro) Budućnost Podgorica
- Top goalscorer: League: Jabá (7); All: Jabá (10)
- Highest home attendance: 15,000 vs Budućnost Podgorica; 15 July 2010
- Lowest home attendance: 100 vs AZAL; 7 May 2011
- Average home league attendance: 1,692
Home colours	Away colours	Third colours

The 2010-11 FK Baku season was the club's thirteenth season in the Azerbaijan Premier League. They started the season under German manager Winfried Schäfer, however he was sacked and replaced by Latvian Aleksandrs Starkovs in January 2011. FK Baku finished the season in sixth place. They also took part in the 2010–11 Azerbaijan Cup, getting knocked out by Khazar Lankaran in the semi-final stage. Baku entered the 2010–11 UEFA Europa League at the first qualifying round stage, and got knocked out in this round by Budućnost Podgorica, from Montenegro, after fielding a suspended player in the first leg in which Budućnost Podgorica were awarded a 3–0 win after the original match had ended in a 2–1 win for Baku.

== Squad ==
Note: Flags indicate national team as defined under FIFA eligibility rules; some limited exceptions apply. Players may hold more than one non-FIFA nationality.

No.	Pos.	Nation	Player
1	GK	CRO	Marko Šarlija
3	DF	AZE	Rafael Amirbekov
4	MF	MDA	Vadim Boret
5	DF	FRA	Stéphane Borbiconi (loan from FC Metz)
7	MF	AZE	Mahmud Qurbanov
8	MF	CRO	Ernad Skulić
9	FW	AZE	Vagif Javadov (loan from Twente)
10	MF	AZE	Nijat Abdullayev
11	FW	MAR	Adnan Barakat
12	FW	MDA	Veaceslav Sofroni
15	MF	AZE	Jamshid Maharramov (captain)
16	GK	AZE	Aqil Mammadov
18	DF	BUL	Radomir Todorov

No.	Pos.	Nation	Player
20	MF	AZE	Fábio Luís Ramim
23	GK	SEN	Khalidou Sissokho
27	MF	AZE	Bakhtiyar Soltanov
29	MF	AZE	Aziz Guliyev
30	MF	SLE	Ibrahim Kargbo
32	DF	MDA	Alexei Savinov
33	DF	SRB	Stevan Bates
39	MF	UKR	Ruslan Levyha
55	MF	BRA	Juninho
77	MF	CRO	Aleksandar Šolić
85	FW	BRA	Jabá
99	MF	BRA	Leonardo Rocha

== Transfers ==
=== Summer ===
In: Note: Flags indicate national team as defined under FIFA eligibility rules; some limited exceptions apply. Players may hold more than one non-FIFA nationality.

No.	Pos.	Nation	Player
2	FW	BIH	Saša Kajkut (from (Serbia) Borac Banja Luka)
5	DF	FRA	Stéphane Borbiconi (loan from (France) FC Metz)
6	DF	TOG	Daré Nibombé (from (Romania) Politehnica Timișoara)
9	FW	AZE	Vagif Javadov (loan from (Netherlands) FC Twente)
10	FW	CMR	Joël Epalle (from (Germany) VfL Bochum)
12	FW	MDA	Veaceslav Sofroni (from (Moldova) Zimbru Chişinău)
25	MF	COL	Jefferson Angulo (from (Brazil) Catanduvense)
29	DF	AZE	Aziz Guliyev (from (Azerbaijan) FK Karvan)
30	MF	SLE	Ibrahim Kargbo (from (Netherlands) Willem II)
55	MF	BRA	Juninho (from (Azerbaijan) Khazar Lankaran)
99	FW	BRA	Leonardo Rocha (from (Venezuela) Deportivo Lara)

Out: Note: Flags indicate national team as defined under FIFA eligibility rules; some limited exceptions apply. Players may hold more than one non-FIFA nationality.

No.	Pos.	Nation	Player
14	DF	AZE	Elvin Aliyev (loan to (Azerbaijan) AZAL)
18	MF	BDI	Floribert Ndayisaba (to (Burundi) Fantastique Bujumbura)
19	FW	NGR	Ahmad Tijani (released)
21	MF	BRA	Wênio (to (Brazil) Morrinhos)
22	DF	AZE	Sabuhi Hasanov (to (Azerbaijan) Simurq)
29	MF	ROU	Cristian Muscalu (to (Poland) Tur Turek)
33	DF	AZE	Saşa Yunisoğlu (to (Azerbaijan) Gabala)
34	FW	BRA	Adriano (to (Brazil) Metropolitano)
55	FW	KEN	Allan Wanga (to (Vietnam) Hoang Anh Gia Lai)

=== Winter ===
In: Note: Flags indicate national team as defined under FIFA eligibility rules; some limited exceptions apply. Players may hold more than one non-FIFA nationality.

No.	Pos.	Nation	Player
3	DF	AZE	Rafael Amirbekov (from (Azerbaijan) FK Ganja)
18	DF	BUL	Radomir Todorov (From (Azerbaijan) Khazar Lankaran)
33	DF	SRB	Stevan Bates (from (Norway) Tromsø IL)
39	MF	UKR	Ruslan Levyha (From (Kazakhstan) FC Tobol)

Out: Note: Flags indicate national team as defined under FIFA eligibility rules; some limited exceptions apply. Players may hold more than one non-FIFA nationality.

No.	Pos.	Nation	Player
2	FW	BIH	Saša Kajkut (to (Bosnia and Herzegovina) Borac Banja Luka)
6	DF	TOG	Daré Nibombé (to (Germany) Arminia Bielefeld)
10	FW	CMR	Joël Epalle (to (Greece) Iraklis Thessaloniki)
25	MF	COL	Jefferson Angulo (to (Colombia) Millonarios)

== Competitions ==
=== Azerbaijan Premier League ===
==== First round ====
===== Results =====
7 August 2010 1	Baku	2–3	AZAL	Tofik Bakhramov Stadium
20:00 AZST (UTC+5)	Jabá 64', 77'	Summary	Juška 43', 52'; Bunjevčević 54'	Attendance: 450; Referee: Elchin Mämmädov

15 August 2010 2	FK Mughan	1–0	Baku	Salyany Olympic Stadium
18:00 AZST (UTC+5)	Gutiérrez 70'	Summary	Jafarguliyev (yellow card) 68' (yellow-red card) 90+3'	Attendance: 700; Referee: Elnur Muradov

22 August 2010 3	Baku	2–1	Gabala	Tofik Bakhramov Stadium
20:00 AZST (UTC+5)	Ramim 29'; Jabá 75' (pen.)	Report; Summary	Burton 6'; Antić (yellow card) 87' (red card) 89'; Baranin (red card) 90+2'	Attendance: 150; Referee: Vusal Aliyev

20 October 2010 4	Qarabağ	2–0	Baku	Baku^{1}
16:00 AZST (UTC+5)	Adamia 25', 66'	Summary		Stadium: Tofiq Bahramov Stadium; Attendance: 500; Referee: Elchin Mämmädov

12 September 2010 5	Baku	1–1	FK Ganja	Tofik Bakhramov Stadium
20:00 AZST (UTC+5)	Nibombé 45+2'; Kargbo (yellow card) 35' (yellow-red card) 59'; Guliyev (yellow card) 40' (yellow-red card) 76'	Summary	Junivan 57'	Attendance: 200; Referee: Fariz Yusifov

19 September 2010 6	Simurq	1–1	Baku	Zaqatala City Stadium
17:00 AZST (UTC+5)	Tskhadadze 34'	Summary	Sofroni 77'	Attendance: 600; Referee: Afgan Hamzayev

27 September 2010 7	Baku	3–1	Turan Tovuz	Tofik Bakhramov Stadium
18:00 AZST (UTC+5)	Borbiconi 23'; Javadov 30'; Skulić 68'	Summary	Orucov 77'	Attendance: 1,000; Referee: Elnur Muradov

2 October 2010 8	Khazar Lankaran	1–1	Baku	Lankaran City Stadium
18:00 AZST (UTC+5)	Parks 23'	Summary	Jabá (red card) 74'; Javadov 85'	Attendance: 12,000; Referee: Fariz Yusifov

16 October 2010 9	Baku	2–1	MOIK Baku	Tofik Bakhramov Stadium
18:00 AZST (UTC+5)	Juninho 19'; Javadov 30'	Summary	Nibombé 5' (o.g.)	Attendance: 300; Referee: Ramil Diniyev

24 October 2010 10	Inter Baku	1–0	Baku	Shafa Stadium
18:00 AZST (UTC+5)	Accioly 5'	Summary		Attendance: 1,500; Referee: Vusal Aliyev

31 October 2010 11	Baku	0–2	Neftchi Baku	Tofik Bakhramov Stadium
17:15 AZT (UTC+4)		Summary	Flavinho 50'; Nasimov 71'	Attendance: 1,000; Referee: Fariz Yusifov

6 November 2010 12	FK Ganja	1–3	Baku	Ganja City Stadium
14:00 AZT (UTC+4)	Sultanov 14' (pen.)	Summary	Barakat 18'; Rocha 69', 72'	Attendance: 8,000; Referee: Anar Salmanov

13 November 2010 13	Baku	2–0	Qarabağ	Tofik Bakhramov Stadium
16:00 AZT (UTC+4)	Borbiconi 17'; Rocha 90+3'	Summary		Attendance: 500; Referee: Fariz Yusifov

20 November 2010 14	MOIK Baku	0–4	Baku	MOIK Stadium
14:00 AZT (UTC+4)		Summary	Skulić 56', 81'; Guliyev (yellow card) 45+1' (yellow-red card) 86'; Epalle 88'; Kajkut 90+2'	Attendance: 500; Referee: Afgan Hamzayev

27 November 2010 15	Baku	1–1	Khazar Lankaran	Tofig Bahramov Stadium
16:10 AZT (UTC+4)	Jafarguliyev 56'	Summary	Parks 17'	Attendance: 2,000; Referee: Vusal Aliyev

5 December 2010 16	Baku	0–1	Simurq	Tofik Bakhramov Stadium
16:00 AZT (UTC+4)		Summary	Aliyev 8'	Attendance: 500; Referee: Rahim Hasanov

11 December 2010 17	Neftchi Baku	0–2	Baku	Tofik Bakhramov Stadium
18:00 AZT (UTC+4)		Summary	Denis 43' (o.g.); Jabá 76'	Attendance: 4,000; Referee: Rovshan Ahmadov

18 December 2010 18	Baku	1–2	Inter Baku	Tofik Bakhramov Stadium
16:30 AZT (UTC+4)	Borbiconi 51'; Borets (yellow card) 80' (yellow-red card) 80'	Summary	Borbiconi 73' (o.g.); Červenka 81'	Attendance: 500; Referee: Vusal Aliyev

23 December 2010 19	Gabala	0–1	Baku	Gabala City Stadium
13:00 AZT (UTC+4)		Report; Summary	Jabá 50'	Attendance: 2,500; Referee: Elchin Mammadov

12 February 2011 20	Baku	1–1	FK Mughan	Tofik Bakhramov Stadium
18:30 AZT (UTC+4)	Guliyev 5'	Summary	Mammadov 48'	Attendance: 400; Referee: Anar Salmanov

19 February 2011 21	Turan Tovuz	0–1	Baku	Tovuz City Stadium
14:00 AZT (UTC+4)		Summary	Jabá 8'	Attendance: 3,500; Referee: Vusal Aliyev

25 February 2011 22	AZAL	0–0	Baku	Shafa Stadium
16:00 AZT (UTC+4)		Summary		Attendance: 500; Referee: Elchin Mämmädov

===== Table =====
Pos	Team	Pld	W	D	L	GF	GA	GD	Pts	Qualification
4	Inter Baku	22	12	4	6	24	16	+8	40	Qualification for championship group
5	AZAL	22	9	9	4	27	16	+11	36	Qualification for championship group
6	Baku	22	9	6	7	28	21	+7	33	Qualification for championship group
7	Gabala	22	8	7	7	19	14	+5	31	Qualification for relegation group
8	Mughan	22	7	6	9	14	23	−9	27	Qualification for relegation group

Source: Soccerway.com
Rules for classification: 1) points; 2) goal difference; 3) number of goals scored.

==== Championship group ====
===== Results =====
13 March 2011 23	Baku	0–1	Neftchi Baku	Tofik Bakhramov Stadium
18:00 AZT (UTC+4)		Summary	Flavinho 8'	Attendance: 700; Referee: Afgan Hamzayev

18 March 2011 24	Inter Baku	1–1	Baku	Shafa Stadium
16:00 AZT (UTC+4)	Poškus 82'	Summary	Jabá 9'	Attendance: 500; Referee: Elchin Mämmädov

2 April 2011 25	Baku	0–0	Khazar Lankaran	Tofig Bahramov Stadium
18:00 AZST (UTC+5)		Summary		Attendance: 2,000; Referee: Ramil Diniyev

10 April 2011 26	AZAL	1–0	Baku	AZAL Stadium
18:00 AZST (UTC+5)	Bliznyuk 45+2'	Summary		Attendance: 2,000; Referee: Elnur Muradov

16 April 2011 27	Baku	0–0	Qarabağ	Tofig Bahramov Stadium
18:00 AZST (UTC+5)		Summary		Attendance: 500; Referee: Elchin Mämmädov

23 April 2011 28	Neftchi Baku	2–0	Baku	Tofik Bakhramov Stadium
16:00 AZST (UTC+5)	Flavinho 19', 54' (pen.)	Summary		Attendance: 500; Referee: Elnur Muradov

1 May 2011 29	Qarabağ	2–2	Baku	Baku^{1}
16:00 AZST (UTC+5)	Adamia 60'; Teli 90'	Summary	Hashimov 22' (o.g.); Javadov 26'	Stadium: Tofiq Bahramov Stadium; Attendance: 1,500; Referee: Anar Salmanov

7 May 2011 30	Baku	2–1	AZAL	Tofik Bakhramov Stadium
15:00 AZST (UTC+5)	Šolić 20'; Sofroni 79'	Summary	Usim 66'	Attendance: 100; Referee: Rahim Hasanov

13 May 2011 31	Khazar Lankaran	2–0	Baku	Lankaran City Stadium
18:30 AZST (UTC+5)	Scarlatache 67'; Opara 83'	Summary		Attendance: 12,000; Referee: Vusal Aliyev

12 March 2011 32	Baku	0–1	Inter Baku	Tofik Bakhramov Stadium
15:00 AZST (UTC+5)		Summary	Amiraslanov 26'	Attendance: 300; Referee: Aliyar Agayev

===== Table =====
Pos	Team	Pld	W	D	L	GF	GA	GD	Pts	Qualification
1	Neftçi Baku (C)	32	19	10	3	53	17	+36	67	Qualification for Champions League second qualifying round
2	Khazar Lankaran	32	16	12	4	38	18	+20	60	Qualification for Europa League second qualifying round (Note: Khazar Lankaran won the 2010–11 Azerbaijan Cup and therefore qualified for the second qualifying round of the 2011–12 UEFA Europa League.)
3	Qarabağ	32	17	7	8	41	22	+19	58	Qualification for Europa League first qualifying round
4	AZAL	32	13	10	9	36	28	+8	49	Qualification for Europa League first qualifying round
5	Inter Baku	32	13	10	9	29	24	+5	49	
6	Baku	32	10	10	12	33	32	+1	40	

Source: Soccerway.com
Rules for classification: 1) points; 2) goal difference; 3) number of goals scored.
(C) Champions

=== Azerbaijan Cup ===
8 December 2012 First Round	Baku	1–1 (a.e.t.) (5–3 p)	FK Mughan	Tofik Bakhramov Stadium
14:00 AZT (UTC+4)	Kajkut 70'	Summary	Abdullayev 4'	Attendance: 350; Referee: Rauf Jabbarov

3 March 2011 Quarter Final 1st Leg	Gabala	0–0	Baku	Gabala City Stadium
14:00 AZT (UTC+4)		Summary		Attendance: 500; Referee: Rovshan Ahmadov

8 March 2011 Quarter Final 2nd Leg	Baku	1–0 (1–0 agg.)	Gabala	Tofik Bakhramov Stadium
16:00 AZT (UTC+4)	Jabá 49'	Summary		Attendance: 500; Referee: Elchin Mammadov

27 April 2011 Semi Final 1st Leg	Khazar Lankaran	1–0	Baku	Lankaran City Stadium
18:30 AZST (UTC+5)	Parks 23'	Summary		Attendance: 14,000; Referee: Fariz Yusifov

4 May 2011 Semi Final 2nd Leg	Baku	2–1 (2–2(a) agg.)	Khazar Lankaran	Tofik Bakhramov Stadium
18:00 AZST (UTC+5)	Rocha 49'; Fábio 85' (pen.)	Summary	Amirguliev 57'	Attendance: 4,000; Referee: Rovshan Ahmadov

=== UEFA Europa League ===
==== First qualifying round ====
15 July 2010 1st Leg	Baku (Azerbaijan)	0–3^{1}	(Montenegro) Budućnost Podgorica	Baku
21:00 AZST (UTC+5)	Kajkut 77'; Jabá 90+4'	Report	Bećiraj 38'	Stadium: Tofiq Bahramov Stadium; Attendance: 15,000; Referee: Augustus Viorel Constantin (Romania)

22 July 2010 2nd Leg	Budućnost Podgorica (Montenegro)	1–2 (4–2 agg.)	(Azerbaijan) Baku	Podgorica
00:00 AZST (UTC+5)	Brnović 64'	Report	Šolić 28'; Jabá 42'	Stadium: Stadion Pod Goricom; Attendance: 3,200; Referee: Dimitrios Kalopoulos (Greece)

Notes

- Note 1: UEFA awarded Budućnost Podgorica a 3–0 win due to Baku fielding a suspended player in the first leg. The original match had ended in a 2–1 win for Baku.

== Squad statistics ==
=== Appearances and goals ===
No.	Pos	Nat	Player	Total		Premier League		Azerbaijan Cup		Europa League	
No.	Pos	Nat	Player	Apps	Goals	Apps	Goals	Apps	Goals	Apps	Goals
1	GK	(Croatia) CRO	Marko Šarlija	30	0	26+0	0	4+0	0	0+0	0
3	DF	(Azerbaijan) AZE	Rafael Amirbekov	5	0	2+1	0	1+1	0	0+0	0
4	MF	(Moldova) MDA	Vadim Boret	19	0	12+1	0	4+0	0	2+0	0
5	DF	(France) FRA	Stéphane Borbiconi	22	4	20+0	4	1+0	0	0+1	0
7	MF	(Azerbaijan) AZE	Mahmud Qurbanov	15	0	5+9	0	1+0	0	0+0	0
8	MF	(Croatia) CRO	Ernad Skulić	18	3	15+1	3	0+0	0	2+0	0
9	FW	(Azerbaijan) AZE	Vagif Javadov	26	4	19+4	4	2+1	0	0+0	0
10	MF	(Azerbaijan) AZE	Nijat Abdullayev	2	0	0+2	0	0+0	0	0+0	0
11	FW	(Morocco) MAR	Adnan Barakat	21	1	15+5	1	0+1	0	0+0	0
12	MF	(Moldova) MDA	Veaceslav Sofroni	17	2	7+7	2	0+2	0	0+1	0
13	GK	(Azerbaijan) AZE	Aqil Mammadov	2	0	2+0	0	0+0	0	0+0	0
15	MF	(Azerbaijan) AZE	Jamshid Maharramov	35	0	30+0	0	4+0	0	1+0	0
17	MF	(Azerbaijan) AZE	Rahman Hajiyev	1	0	0+1	0	0+0	0	0+0	0
18	DF	(Bulgaria) BUL	Radomir Todorov	11	0	7+0	0	4+0	0	0+0	0
20	MF	(Azerbaijan) AZE	Fábio Luís Ramim	30	2	18+6	1	4+0	1	2+0	0
23	GK	(Senegal) SEN	Khalidou Sissokho	7	0	4+0	0	1+0	0	2+0	0
27	MF	(Azerbaijan) AZE	Bakhtiyar Soltanov	15	0	6+7	0	2+0	0	0+0	0
29	MF	(Azerbaijan) AZE	Aziz Guliyev	23	1	17+3	1	3+0	0	0+0	0
30	MF	(Sierra Leone) SLE	Ibrahim Kargbo	32	0	21+4	0	5+0	0	2+0	0
32	DF	(Moldova) MDA	Alexei Savinov	23	0	14+2	0	5+0	0	2+0	0
33	DF	(Serbia) SRB	Stevan Bates	15	0	12+0	0	3+0	0	0+0	0
39	MF	(Ukraine) UKR	Ruslan Levyha	60	0	8+50	0	2+0	0	0+0	0
55	MF	(Brazil) BRA	Juninho	15	1	11+4	1	0+0	0	0+0	0
77	MF	(Croatia) CRO	Aleksandar Šolić	31	2	24+3	1	1+1	0	2+0	1
85	FW	(Brazil) BRA	Jabá	32	10	25+0	7	4+1	1	2+0	2
99	MF	(Brazil) BRA	Leonardo Rocha	18	4	8+6	3	2+2	1	0+0	0
Players who appeared for Baku who left on loan during the season:
21	MF	(Azerbaijan) AZE	Emin Jafarguliyev	4	1	3+1	1	0+0	0	0+0	0
Players who appeared for Baku who left during the season:
2	FW	(Bosnia and Herzegovina) BIH	Saša Kajkut	13	2	2+7	1	1+1	0	2+0	1
6	DF	(Togo) TOG	Daré Nibombé	13	1	10+1	1	0+0	0	2+0	0
10	FW	(Cameroon) CMR	Joël Epalle	12	1	5+5	1	1+0	0	1+0	0
22	DF	(Azerbaijan) AZE	Sabuhi Hasanov	1	0	1+0	0	0+0	0	0+0	0
25	MF	(Colombia) COL	Jefferson Angulo	10	0	2+5	0	0+1	0	0+2	0

=== Goal scorers ===
Place	Position	Nation	Number	Name	Premier League	Azerbaijan Cup	Europa League	Total
1	FW	(Brazil)	85	Jabá	7	1	2	10
2	FW	(Azerbaijan)	9	Vagif Javadov	4	0	0	4
2	DF	(France)	5	Stéphane Borbiconi	4	0	0	4
2	MF	(Brazil)	99	Leonardo Rocha	3	1	0	4
5	MF	(Croatia)	8	Ernad Skulić	3	0	0	3
5	FW	(Bosnia and Herzegovina)	2	Saša Kajkut	1	1	1	3
7				Own goal	2	0	0	2
7	MF	(Azerbaijan)	20	Fábio Luís Ramim	1	1	0	2
7	MF	(Croatia)	77	Aleksandar Šolić	1	0	1	2
10	DF	(Togo)	6	Daré Nibombé	1	0	0	1
10	FW	(Cameroon)	10	Joël Epalle	1	0	0	1
10	MF	(Morocco)	11	Adnan Barakat	1	0	0	1
10	FW	(Moldova)	12	Veaceslav Sofroni	1	0	0	1
10	MF	(Azerbaijan)	21	Emin Jafarguliyev	1	0	0	1
10	MF	(Azerbaijan)	29	Aziz Guliyev	1	0	0	1
10	MF	(Brazil)	55	Juninho	1	0	0	1
				TOTALS	33	4	4	41

=== Disciplinary record ===
Number	Nation	Position	Name	Premier League		Azerbaijan Cup		Europa League		Total	
Number	Nation	Position	Name	Yellow card	Red card	Yellow card	Red card	Yellow card	Red card	Yellow card	Red card
1	(Croatia)	GK	Marko Šarlija	2	0	0	0	0	0	2	0
2	(Bosnia and Herzegovina)	FW	Saša Kajkut	0	0	1	0	0	0	1	0
4	(Moldova)	MF	Vadim Boret	9	1	0	0	1	0	10	1
5	(France)	DF	Stéphane Borbiconi	3	0	0	0	0	0	3	0
6	(Togo)	DF	Daré Nibombé	0	0	0	0	1	0	1	0
8	(Croatia)	MF	Ernad Skulić	2	0	0	0	0	0	2	0
9	(Azerbaijan)	FW	Vagif Javadov	1	0	1	0	0	0	2	0
10	(Cameroon)	FW	Joël Epalle	3	0	0	0	0	0	3	0
11	(Morocco)	FW	Adnan Barakat	3	0	0	0	0	0	3	0
12	(Moldova)	FW	Veaceslav Sofroni	1	0	0	0	0	0	1	0
15	(Azerbaijan)	MF	Jamshid Maharramov	5	0	0	0	0	0	5	0
20	(Azerbaijan)	MF	Fábio Luís Ramim	1	0	3	0	0	0	4	0
21	(Azerbaijan)	MF	Emin Jafarguliyev	3	1	0	0	0	0	3	1
23	(Senegal)	GK	Khalidou Sissokho	2	0	0	0	0	0	2	0
25	(Colombia)	MF	Jefferson Angulo	2	0	0	0	0	0	2	0
29	(Azerbaijan)	MF	Aziz Guliyev	9	2	1	0	0	0	10	2
30	(Sierra Leone)	MF	Ibrahim Kargbo	6	1	1	0	0	0	7	1
32	(Moldova)	DF	Alexei Savinov	0	0	1	0	0	0	1	0
33	(Serbia)	DF	Stevan Bates	4	0	2	0	0	0	6	0
55	(Brazil)	MF	Juninho	4	0	0	0	0	0	4	0
77	(Croatia)	MF	Aleksandar Šolić	5	0	0	0	0	0	5	0
85	(Brazil)	FW	Jabá	5	1	1	0	1	0	7	1
99	(Colombia)	MF	Leonardo Rocha	3	0	0	0	0	0	3	0
			TOTALS	73	6	11	0	3	0	87	6
