= 2011–12 FK Baku season =

Baku
2011–12 season
- President: Hafiz Mammadov
- Manager: Aleksandrs Starkovs
- Stadium: Tofig Bakhramov Stadium
- Premier League: 6th
- Azerbaijan Cup: Champions
- Top goalscorer: League: Winston Parks (8); All: Three Players (8)
- Highest home attendance: 2,000 vs Neftchi; 7 March 2012
- Lowest home attendance: 300 vs Kəpəz; 27 August 2011 & Ravan; 10 September 2011
- Average home league attendance: 698
Home colours	Away colours	Third colours

The Baku 2011–12 season was Baku's fourteenth Azerbaijan Premier League season, in which they finished in 6th position. They also took part in the 2011–12 Azerbaijan Cup, which they won beating Neftchi Baku in the final and therefore qualified for the First qualifying round of the 2012–13 UEFA Europa League. It was their first full season under the management of Aleksandrs Starkovs.

== Squad ==
As of 19 February 2012

Note: Flags indicate national team as defined under FIFA eligibility rules; some limited exceptions apply. Players may hold more than one non-FIFA nationality.

No.	Pos.	Nation	Player
1	GK	CRO	Marko Šarlija
2	DF	CRO	Duje Baković
3	DF	LAT	Deniss Ivanovs
4	MF	MDA	Vadim Boret
6	MF	SLE	Ibrahim Kargbo
7	MF	LTU	Deividas Česnauskis
8	MF	BRA	Juninho
9	FW	LAT	Māris Verpakovskis
10	MF	SLO	Lucas Horvat
11	MF	AZE	Elvin Mammadov
14	DF	AZE	Elvin Aliyev (vice-captain)

No.	Pos.	Nation	Player
15	MF	AZE	Jamshid Maharramov (captain)
16	GK	AZE	Aqil Mammadov
19	FW	AZE	Nurlan Novruzov
21	DF	AZE	Novruz Mammadov
23	GK	SEN	Khalidou Sissokho
24	MF	SRB	Nenad Kovačević
25	DF	AZE	Shahriyar Aliyev
36	FW	CRC	Winston Parks
77	MF	CRO	Aleksandar Šolić
98	FW	ESP	Koke
99	MF	AZE	Rahman Hajiyev

== Transfers ==
=== Summer ===
In: Note: Flags indicate national team as defined under FIFA eligibility rules; some limited exceptions apply. Players may hold more than one non-FIFA nationality.

No.	Pos.	Nation	Player
3	DF	LAT	Deniss Ivanovs (from (Turkey) Sivasspor)
7	MF	LTU	Deividas Česnauskis (from (Greece) Aris)
8	DF	BRA	Juninho (from (Slovenia) Domžale)
9	FW	LAT	Māris Verpakovskis (from (Ukraine) Dynamo Kyiv)
11	MF	AZE	Elvin Mammadov (from (Azerbaijan) FK Qarabağ)
14	DF	AZE	Elvin Aliyev (from (Azerbaijan) AZAL Baku)
21	DF	AZE	Novruz Mammadov (from (Azerbaijan) Mughan)
36	FW	CRC	Winston Parks (from (Romania) Politehnica Timișoara)

Out: Note: Flags indicate national team as defined under FIFA eligibility rules; some limited exceptions apply. Players may hold more than one non-FIFA nationality.

No.	Pos.	Nation	Player
3	DF	AZE	Rafael Amirbekov
5	DF	FRA	Stéphane Borbiconi (loan return to (France) Metz)
7	MF	AZE	Mahmud Qurbanov (to (Azerbaijan) Sumgayit City)
8	MF	CRO	Ernad Skulić (to (Croatia) Inter Zaprešić)
9	FW	AZE	Vagif Javadov (loan return to (Netherlands) Twente)
11	MF	MAR	Adnan Barakat (to (Thailand) Muangthong United)
12	FW	MDA	Veaceslav Sofroni (to (Moldova) Costuleni)
18	DF	BUL	Radomir Todorov (to (Bulgaria) Spartak Varna)
27	MF	AZE	Bakhtiyar Soltanov (to (Azerbaijan) Qarabağ)
55	MF	BRA	Juninho (to (Brazil) Ferroviária)
99	MF	BRA	Leonardo Rocha (to (Azerbaijan) Qarabağ)
—	DF	AZE	Haji Ahmadov (on loan to (Azerbaijan) Sumgayit City)

=== Winter ===
In: Note: Flags indicate national team as defined under FIFA eligibility rules; some limited exceptions apply. Players may hold more than one non-FIFA nationality.

No.	Pos.	Nation	Player
2	DF	CRO	Duje Baković (from (Croatia) NK Rijeka)
10	MF	SLO	Lucas Mario Horvat (from (Slovenia) NK Domžale)
24	MF	SRB	Nenad Kovačević (from (Serbia) Red Star Belgrade)
98	FW	ESP	Koke (from (Spain) Rayo Vallecano)

Out: Note: Flags indicate national team as defined under FIFA eligibility rules; some limited exceptions apply. Players may hold more than one non-FIFA nationality.

No.	Pos.	Nation	Player
10	MF	AZE	Nijat Abdullayev
20	MF	AZE	Fábio Luís Ramim
29	MF	AZE	Aziz Guliyev (to (Azerbaijan) Inter Baku)
32	DF	MDA	Alexei Savinov
33	DF	SRB	Stevan Bates (to (Serbia) FK Rad)
39	MF	UKR	Ruslan Levyha (to (Ukraine) Olimpik Donetsk)
85	FW	BRA	Jabá (to (Turkey) Antalyaspor)
—	DF	AZE	Emin Jafarguliyev (on loan to (Azerbaijan) Simurq)

== Competitions ==
=== Azerbaijan Premier League ===
==== Results summary ====
Overall								Home						Away					
Pld	W	D	L	GF	GA	GD	Pts	W	D	L	GF	GA	GD	W	D	L	GF	GA	GD
22	10	5	7	27	22	+5	35	5	3	3	15	14	+1	5	2	4	12	8	+4

Last updated: 21 December 2011.
Source: Soccerway

==== Results by round ====
Round	1	2	3	4	5	6	7	8	9	10	11	12	13	14	15	16	17	18	19	20	21	22
Ground	A	H	A	H	H	A	A	H	A	H	A	A	H	H	A	A	H	A	H	A	H	H
Result	D	D	W	L	W	W	L	D	W	D	L	W	W	W	L	D	W	L	L	W	W	L
Position																					5	5

Source: Soccerway
A = Away; H = Home; W = Win; D = Draw; L = Loss

==== Results ====
7 August 2011 1	Gabala	0–0	Baku	Gabala City Stadium
18:00 AZST (UTC+5)		Report; Summary		Attendance: 5,000; Referee: Fariz Yusifov

14 August 2011 2	Baku	0–0	Simurq	Tofig Bakhramov Stadium
21:00 AZST (UTC+5)		Summary		Attendance: 500; Referee: Rovshan Ahmadov

20 August 2011 3	Inter Baku	0–3^{1}	Baku	Shafa Stadium
21:00 AZST (UTC+5)	Lomaia (red card) 90+1'	Summary		Attendance: 2,500; Referee: Ramil Diniyev

27 August 2011 4	Baku	0–3	Kəpəz	Tofig Bakhramov Stadium
18:00 AZST (UTC+5)	Kargbo (yellow card) 61' (yellow-red card) 81'	Summary	Allahguliyev 23'; Fomenko 27', 40'	Attendance: 300; Referee: Elchin Mämmädov

10 September 2011 5	Baku	3–2	Ravan Baku	Tofig Bakhramov Stadium
17:30 AZST (UTC+5)	Šolić 7', 30'; Ivanovs 20'	Summary	Novruzov (red card) 48'; Torres 70'; Barlay 79'	Attendance: 300; Referee: Anar Salmanov

18 September 2011 6	Turan Tovuz	0–2	Baku	Tovuz City Stadium
16:00 AZST (UTC+5)		Summary	Parks 43'; Hajiyev 90'	Attendance: 4,500; Referee: Rauf Jabbarov

23 September 2011 7	Neftchi Baku	1–0	Baku	Tofig Bahramov Stadium
18:00 AZST (UTC+5)	Denis 86'	Summary		Attendance: 800; Referee: Elchin Mammadov

29 September 2011 8	Baku	0–0	AZAL	Tofig Bahramov Stadium
18:00 AZST (UTC+5)		Summary		Attendance: 420; Referee: Vusal Aliyev

16 October 2011 9	Sumgayit	0–1	Baku	Mehdi Huseynzade Stadium
15:00 AZST (UTC+5)	Popoviç (red card) 18'	Summary	Verpakovskis 46'	Attendance: 2,000; Referee: Anar Salmanov

21 October 2011 10	Baku	2–2	Khazar Lankaran	Tofig Bahramov Stadium
15:00 AZST (UTC+5)	Parks 62', 69'; Maharramov (yellow card) 40' (yellow-red card) 73'	Summary	Bonfim 25'; Rusic 77'; Gurbanov (yellow card) 86' (yellow-red card) 90+3'	Attendance: 1,000; Referee: Fariz Yusifov

28 October 2011 11	Qarabağ	2–1	Baku	Guzanli Olympic Stadium
15:00 AZST (UTC+5)	Teli 7'; Sadigov 48'	Summary	Verpakovskis 36'	Attendance: 2,000; Referee: Anar Salmanov

4 November 2011 12	Kəpəz	1–3	Baku	Ganja City Stadium
14:00 AZT (UTC+4)	Feutchine 70'	Summary	Parks 12'; Česnauskis 36'; Šolić 65'	Attendance: 8,300; Referee: Elchin Mämmädov

20 November 2011 13	Baku	5–0	Turan	Tofig Bahramov Stadium
14:30 AZT (UTC+4)	Ivanovs 15'; Juninho 28', 87'; Parks 39'; Šolić 44'	Summary		Attendance: 400; Referee: Vusal Aliyev

25 November 2011 14	Baku	2–1	Gabala	Tofig Bakhramov Stadium
13:30 AZT (UTC+4)	Česnauskis 17'; Parks 29'	Summary	Djiehoua 88' (pen.)	Attendance: 1,000; Referee: Elchin Mammadov

4 December 2011 15	AZAL	1–0	Baku	AZAL Stadium
16:00 AZT (UTC+4)	Tales Schutz 16'; Khalilov (yellow card) 79' (yellow-red card) 86'	Summary		Attendance: 1000; Referee: Anar Salmanov

10 December 2011 16	Ravan Baku	0–0	Baku	Dalga Arena
15:00 AZT (UTC+4)		Summary		Attendance: 300; Referee: Rovshan Ahmadov

15 December 2011 17	Baku	1–0	Sumgayit	Tofig Bakhramov Stadium
14:00 AZT (UTC+4)	Verpakovskis 54'	Summary		Attendance: 400; Referee: Vusal Aliyev

21 December 2011 18	Khazar Lankaran	3–0	Baku	Lankaran City Stadium
16:00 AZT (UTC+4)	Subašić 29' (pen.); Wobay 45+1'; Amirguliev 54'	Summary		Referee: Fariz Yusifov

15 February 2012 19	Baku	0–3	Qarabağ	Tofig Bahramov Stadium
14:00 AZT (UTC+4)		Summary	Ismayilov 28' (pen.); Sadigov 48'; Adamia 65'	Attendance: 400; Referee: Aliyar Ağayev

21 February 2012 20	Simurq	0–2	Baku	Zaqatala City Stadium
16:00 AZT (UTC+4)		Summary	Baković 2'; Horvat (yellow card) 61' (yellow-red card) 62'; Koke 64'	Attendance: 0 Referee: Anar Salmanov

3 March 2012 21	Baku	1–0	Inter	Tofig Bahramov Stadium
14:30 AZT (UTC+4)	Juninho 11'; Mammadov (red card) 65'	Summary		Attendance: 1,000; Referee: Elchin Mämmädov

7 March 2012 22	Baku	1–3	Neftchi	Ismat Gayibov Stadium
15:00 AZT (UTC+4)	Novruzov 87'	Summary	Abishov 7'; Abdullayev 36'; Amirjanov 40'	Attendance: 2,000; Referee: Fariz Yusifov

Notes

- Match Abandoned in the 94th minute, at 0–0. Match awarded 0–3

==== Table ====
Pos	Team	Pld	W	D	L	GF	GA	GD	Pts	Qualification
3	Khazar Lankaran	22	13	5	4	33	19	+14	44	Qualification for championship group
4	Qarabağ	22	12	5	5	27	14	+13	41	Qualification for championship group
5	Baku	22	10	5	7	27	22	+5	35	Qualification for championship group
6	Gabala	22	10	5	7	27	23	+4	35	Qualification for championship group
7	AZAL	22	8	5	9	35	35	0	29	Qualification for relegation group

Source: Soccerway: Azerbaijan Premier League Table
Rules for classification: 1) points; 2) goal difference; 3) number of goals scored.

=== Azerbaijan Premier League Championship Group ===
==== Results summary ====
Overall								Home						Away					
Pld	W	D	L	GF	GA	GD	Pts	W	D	L	GF	GA	GD	W	D	L	GF	GA	GD
10	5	0	5	15	14	+1	15	3	0	2	9	5	+4	2	0	3	6	9	−3

Last updated: 21 December 2011.
Source: Soccerway

==== Results by round ====
Round	1	2	3	4	5	6	7	8	9	10
Ground	H	A	H	H	A	H	A	A	H	A
Result	L	W	L	W	L	W	W	L	W	L
Position	6	6	6	6	6	6	5	6	5	6

Source: Soccerway
A = Away; H = Home; W = Win; D = Draw; L = Loss

==== Results ====
11 March 2012 23	Baku	0–1	Inter Baku	Tofig Bakhramov Stadium
16:00 AZT (UTC+4)		Summary	Niasse 34'; Mammadov (yellow card) 62' (yellow-red card) 63'	Attendance: 400; Referee: Anar Salmanov

19 March 2012 24	Khazar Lankaran	0–1	Baku	Lankaran City Stadium
18:00 AZT (UTC+4)		Summary	Česnauskis 39'	Attendance: 9,000; Referee: Anar Salmanov

24 March 2012 25	Baku	1–2	Qarabağ	Tofig Bakhramov Stadium
14:30 AZT (UTC+4)	Hajiyev 71'	Summary	Medvedev 8'; Javadov 47'	Attendance: 1,200; Referee: Vusal Aliyev

31 March 2012 26	Baku	2–1	Gabala	Tofig Bakhramov Stadium
15:00 AZST (UTC+5)	Parks 57'; Šolić 90+3'	Summary	Kamanan 16'	Attendance: 350; Referee: Rauf Jabbarov

8 April 2012 27	Neftchi Baku	2–1	Baku	Ismat Gayibov Stadium
16:00 AZST (UTC+5)	Flavinho 21'; Nasimov 52'	Summary	Parks 87'	Attendance: 1,550; Referee: Fariz Yusifov

14 April 2012 28	Baku	4–1	Khazar Lankaran	Tofig Bakhramov Stadium
15:00 AZST (UTC+5)	Česnauskis 34', 41', 57'; Šolić 69'	Summary	Subašić 63'; Doman (red card) 77'	Attendance: 500; Referee: Vusal Aliyev

22 April 2012 29	Qarabağ	2–4	Baku	Guzanli Olympic Complex Stadium
16:00 AZST (UTC+5)	Adamia 34'; Muarem 89'	Summary	Ivanovs 14'; Česnauskis 62'; Šolić 65'; Yusifov 75' (o.g.)	Attendance: 2,000; Referee: Aliyar Agayev

29 April 2012 30	Gabala	4–0	Baku	Gabala City Stadium
17:00 AZST (UTC+5)	Kamanan 37'; Hüseynov 47'; Mendy 58'; Mammadov 90+2'	Summary		Attendance: 800; Referee: Rauf Jabbarov

5 May 2012 31	Baku	2–0	Neftchi Baku	Tofig Bakhramov Stadium
17:30 AZST (UTC+5)	Novruzov 44'; Koke 90'	Summary		Attendance: 1,000; Referee: Orkhan Mämmädov

11 May 2012 32	Inter Baku	1–0	Baku	Shafa Stadium
17:30 AZST (UTC+5)	Tskhadadze 65'	Summary		Attendance: 350; Referee: Vusal Aliyev

==== Table ====
Pos	Team	Pld	W	D	L	GF	GA	GD	Pts	Qualification or relegation
1	Neftçi Baku (C)	32	20	3	9	55	30	+25	63	Qualification for Champions League second qualifying round
2	Khazar Lankaran	32	17	8	7	44	28	+16	59	Qualification for Europa League first qualifying round (Note: Baku qualified for the first qualifiying round of the 2012–13 UEFA Europa League as winner of the 2011–12 Azerbaijan Cup.)
3	Inter Baku	32	16	8	8	29	21	+8	56	Qualification for Europa League first qualifying round
4	Qarabağ	32	15	8	9	37	28	+9	53	
5	Gabala	32	15	7	10	43	32	+11	52	
6	Baku	32	15	5	12	42	37	+5	50	Qualification for Europa League first qualifying round

Source: Soccerway.com
Rules for classification: 1) points; 2) goal difference; 3) number of goals scored.
(C) Champions

=== Azerbaijan Cup ===
30 November 2011 First Round	Baku	0–0 (a.e.t.) (3–2 p)	Ravan Baku	Tofig Bakhramov Stadium
13:30 AZT (UTC+4)		Summary		Attendance: 1,000; Referee: Rovshan Ahmadov

14 March 2012 Quarter Finals 1st Leg	Baku	3–1	AZAL	Tofig Bahramov Stadium
15:00 AZT (UTC+4)	Šolić 27'; Česnauskis 59'; Koke 64'	Summary	Rahimov 68'	Attendance: 1,000; Referee: Rahim Hasanov

28 March 2012 Quarter Finals 2nd Leg	AZAL	1–2 (2–5 agg.)	Baku	AZAL Arena
16:00 AZT (UTC+4)	Kvirtia (red card) 45+1'; Safiyaroglu 52'	Summary	Juninho 5', 85'	Attendance: 300; Referee: Aliyar Ağayev

18 April 2012 Semi Final 1st Leg	Baku	0–1	Qarabağ	Tofig Bahramov Stadium
15:30 AZST (UTC+5)		Summary	Adamia 89'	Attendance: 2,000; Referee: Fariz Yusifov

25 April 2012 Semi Final 2nd Leg	Qarabağ	0–1 (a.e.t.) (1–1 agg.) (4–5 p)	Baku	Guzanli Olympic Complex Stadium
16:00 AZST (UTC+5)		Summary; Youtube	Horvat 39'	Attendance: 2,000; Referee: Elchin Mämmädov
	Penalties
	Javadov (penalty scored); R.A.Sadigov (penalty missed); Medvedev (penalty scored); Yusifov (penalty scored); R.F.Sadygov (penalty scored)		(penalty scored) Šolić; (penalty scored) Česnauskis; (penalty scored) Maharramov; (penalty scored) Horvat; (penalty scored) Kovačević

==== Final ====
17 May 2012	Baku	2–0	Neftchi Baku	Dalga Arena
20:00 AZST (UTC+5)	Koke 8'; Juninho 27'	Summary	Denis (yellow card) 60' (yellow-red card) 82'	Attendance: 4,300; Referee: Aliyar Ağayev

== Squad statistics ==
=== Appearances and goals ===
As of 21 May 2012

No.	Pos	Nat	Player	Total		Premier League		Azerbaijan Cup	
No.	Pos	Nat	Player	Apps	Goals	Apps	Goals	Apps	Goals
1	GK	(Croatia) CRO	Marko Šarlija	30	0	28+0	0	2+0	0
2	DF	(Croatia) CRO	Duje Baković	5	1	5+0	1	0+0	0
3	DF	(Latvia) LAT	Deniss Ivanovs	36	3	31+0	3	5+0	0
4	MF	(Moldova) MDA	Vadim Boret	1	0	0+1	0	0+0	0
6	MF	(Sierra Leone) SLE	Ibrahim Kargbo	33	0	27+1	0	5+0	0
7	MF	(Lithuania) LTU	Deividas Česnauskis	29	8	17+8	7	4+0	1
8	MF	(Brazil) BRA	Juninho	30	6	22+3	3	5+0	3
9	FW	(Latvia) LAT	Māris Verpakovskis	22	3	15+4	3	3+0	0
10	MF	(Slovenia) SLO	Lucas Horvat	16	1	10+3	0	2+1	1
11	MF	(Azerbaijan) AZE	Elvin Mammadov	22	0	17+2	0	2+1	0
14	DF	(Azerbaijan) AZE	Elvin Aliyev	15	0	14+0	0	1+0	0
15	MF	(Azerbaijan) AZE	Jamshid Maharramov	29	0	24+1	0	4+0	0
16	GK	(Azerbaijan) AZE	Aqil Mammadov	7	0	4+0	0	3+0	0
17	MF	(Azerbaijan) AZE	Namik Alaskarov	1	0	0+1	0	0+0	0
19	FW	(Azerbaijan) AZE	Nurlan Novruzov	17	2	3+11	2	0+3	0
20	DF	(Azerbaijan) AZE	Elshad Manafov	3	0	2+0	0	1+0	0
21	DF	(Azerbaijan) AZE	Novruz Mammadov	25	0	22+0	0	2+1	0
22	FW	(Azerbaijan) AZE	Tural Gurbatov	6	0	2+4	0	0+0	0
23	GK	(Senegal) SEN	Khalidou Sissokho	0	0	0+0	0	0+0	0
24	MF	(Serbia) SRB	Nenad Kovačević	13	0	9+0	0	4+0	0
25	DF	(Azerbaijan) AZE	Shahriyar Aliyev	17	0	14+1	0	2+0	0
32	DF	(Moldova) MDA	Alexei Savinov	9	0	6+3	0	0+0	0
36	FW	(Costa Rica) CRC	Winston Parks	29	8	25+0	8	2+2	0
77	MF	(Croatia) CRO	Aleksandar Šolić	29	8	18+6	7	4+1	1
85	FW	(Azerbaijan) AZE	Vadim Abdullayev	1	0	0+1	0	0+0	0
98	FW	(Spain) ESP	Koke	15	4	9+1	2	4+1	2
99	MF	(Azerbaijan) AZE	Rahman Hajiyev	28	2	13+13	2	0+2	0
Players who appeared for Baku no longer at the club:
4	MF	(Moldova) MDA	Vadim Boret	14	0	3+10	0	0+1	0
5	DF	(Serbia) SRB	Stevan Bates	6	0	4+2	0	0+0	0
17	DF	(Azerbaijan) AZE	Emin Jafarguliyev	2	0	0+2	0	0+0	0
20	MF	(Azerbaijan) AZE	Fábio Luís Ramim	6	0	2+3	0	0+1	0
22	MF	(Azerbaijan) AZE	Nijat Abdullayev	2	0	0+2	0	0+0	0
29	MF	(Azerbaijan) AZE	Aziz Guliyev	3	0	2+1	0	0+0	0
85	FW	(Brazil) BRA	Jabá	8	0	3+4	0	0+1	0

=== Goal scorers ===
Place	Position	Nation	Number	Name	Premier League	Azerbaijan Cup	Total
1	FW	(Costa Rica)	36	Winston Parks	8	0	8
1	MF	(Croatia)	77	Aleksandar Šolić	7	1	8
1	MF	(Lithuania)	7	Deividas Česnauskis	7	1	8
4	MF	(Brazil)	8	Juninho	3	3	6
5	FW	(Spain)	98	Koke	2	2	4
6	FW	(Latvia)	9	Māris Verpakovskis	3	0	3
6	DF	(Latvia)	3	Deniss Ivanovs	3	0	3
8	MF	(Azerbaijan)	99	Rahman Hajiyev	2	0	2
8	FW	(Azerbaijan)	19	Nurlan Novruzov	2	0	2
10	DF	(Croatia)	2	Duje Baković	1	0	1
10	MF	(Slovenia)	10	Lucas Horvat	0	1	1
10				Own goal	1	0	1
10				Awarded Goals	3	0	3
				TOTALS	42	8	50

=== Disciplinary record ===
Number	Nation	Position	Name	Premier League		Azerbaijan Cup		Total	
Number	Nation	Position	Name	Yellow card	Red card	Yellow card	Red card	Yellow card	Red card
1	(Croatia)	GK	Marko Šarlija	2	0	1	0	3	0
2	(Croatia)	DF	Duje Baković	1	0	0	0	1	0
3	(Latvia)	DF	Deniss Ivanovs	4	0	0	0	4	0
4	(Moldova)	MF	Vadim Boret	2	0	0	0	2	0
5	(Serbia)	DF	Stevan Bates	1	0	0	0	1	0
6	(Sierra Leone)	MF	Ibrahim Kargbo	8	1	0	0	8	1
7	(Lithuania)	MF	Deividas Česnauskis	5	0	1	0	6	0
8	(Brazil)	MF	Juninho	1	0	0	0	1	0
9	(Latvia)	FW	Māris Verpakovskis	5	0	0	0	5	0
10	(Slovenia)	MF	Lucas Horvat	3	1	2	0	5	1
11	(Azerbaijan)	MF	Elvin Mammadov	2	1	0	0	2	1
14	(Azerbaijan)	DF	Elvin Aliyev	4	0	0	0	4	0
15	(Azerbaijan)	MF	Jamshid Maharramov	6	0	4	0	10	0
16	(Azerbaijan)	GK	Aqil Mammadov	1	0	1	0	2	0
19	(Azerbaijan)	FW	Nurlan Novruzov	2	0	1	0	3	0
21	(Azerbaijan)	DF	Novruz Mammadov	8	0	0	0	8	0
24	(Serbia)	MF	Nenad Kovačević	2	0	1	0	3	0
25	(Azerbaijan)	DF	Shahriyar Aliyev	4	0	1	0	5	0
29	(Azerbaijan)	MF	Aziz Guliyev	1	0	0	0	1	0
32	(Moldova)	DF	Alexei Savinov	2	0	0	0	2	0
36	(Costa Rica)	FW	Winston Parks	2	0	0	0	2	0
77	(Croatia)	MF	Aleksandar Šolić	3	0	1	0	4	0
98	(Spain)	FW	Koke	1	0	2	0	3	0
			TOTALS	70	4	15	0	85	4

=== Monthly awards ===
Month	Azerbaijan Professional Football League Awards	
Month	Player	Award
October	(Costa Rica) Winston Parks	Won
April	(Lithuania) Deividas Česnauskis	Won

=== Annual awards ===
Award	PFL Seasonal Awards	
Award	Player	Award
Young Player of the Year	(Azerbaijan) Nurlan Novruzov	Won
