= Leonardo Rocha =

Leonardo Rocha may refer to:

- Léo Rocha (born 1985), Brazilian footballer
- Leonardo Rocha (footballer), Portuguese footballer
