= Agil Mammadov (footballer, born 1989) =

Azerbaijani footballer

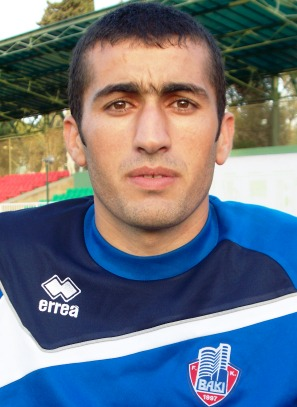

Personal information
- Date of birth: 1 May 1989 (age 37)
- Place of birth: Nakhchivan, Azerbaijan
- Height: 1.96 m (6 ft 5 in)
- Position: Goalkeeper

Senior career*
Years	Team	Apps	(Gls)
2007–2014	Baku	44	(0)
2015–2016	Neftchi Baku	41	(0)
2016–2017	AZAL	25	(0)
2017	Gabala	0	(0)
2017	Neftchi Baku	0	(0)
2018–2019	Gabala	7	(0)
2019–2024	Neftchi Baku	51	(0)

International career
2009–2010	Azerbaijan U21	4	(0)
2015	Azerbaijan	1	(0)
- * Club domestic league appearances and goals

Agil Mammadov (born 1 May 1989) is an Azerbaijani former professional footballer who played as a goalkeeper.

== Career ==
=== Club ===
Mammadov played for FK Baku in a qualifier for the 2008–09 UEFA Champions League.

On 4 December 2014, Mammadov left FK Baku after not being paid by the club.

On 24 July 2016, Mammadov signed with AZAL PFK.

On 5 June 2017, Mammadov signed a one-year contract with Gabala FK. Leaving the club on 29 December 2017, with Neftchi Baku announced the signing of Mammadov on a contract until the end of the 2017–18 season, with the option of an additional year.

On 7 January 2019, Mammadov returned to Neftchi Baku from Gabala for his third stint with the club, signing an 18-month contract.

=== International ===
Mammadov represented the Azerbaijan national under-21 football team.

== Career statistics ==
As of match played 5 October 2019

Appearances and goals by club, season and competition
Club	Season	League			National Cup		Continental		Other		Total	
Club	Season	Division	Apps	Goals	Apps	Goals	Apps	Goals	Apps	Goals	Apps	Goals
Baku	2007–08	Azerbaijan Premier League	3	0	0	0	0	0	-		3	0
Baku	2008–09	Azerbaijan Premier League	0	0	0	0	0	0	-		0	0
Baku	2009–10	Azerbaijan Premier League	0	0	0	0	0	0	-		2	0
Baku	2010–11	Azerbaijan Premier League	2	0	0	0	0	0	-		2	0
Baku	2011–12	Azerbaijan Premier League	4	0	3	0	-		-		7	0
Baku	2012–13	Azerbaijan Premier League	2	0	0	0	2	0	-		4	0
Baku	2013–14	Azerbaijan Premier League	19	0	2	0	-		-		21	0
Baku	2014–15	Azerbaijan Premier League	14	0	1	0	-		-		21	0
Baku	Total		44	0	6	0	2	0	-	-	52	0
Neftchi Baku	2014–15	Azerbaijan Premier League	13	0	4	0	0	0	-		17	0
Neftchi Baku	2015–16	Azerbaijan Premier League	28	0	4	0	2	0	-		34	0
Neftchi Baku	Total		41	0	8	0	2	0	-	-	51	0
AZAL	2016–17	Azerbaijan Premier League	25	0	3	0	-		-		28	0
Gabala	2017–18	Azerbaijan Premier League	0	0	1	0	0	0	-		1	0
Neftchi Baku	2017–18	Azerbaijan Premier League	0	0	0	0	-		-		0	0
Gabala	2017–18	Azerbaijan Premier League	3	0	1	0	0	0	-		4	0
Gabala	2018–19	Azerbaijan Premier League	4	0	0	0	0	0	-		4	0
Gabala	Total		7	0	1	0	0	0	-	-	8	0
Neftchi Baku	2018–19	Azerbaijan Premier League	0	0	0	0	0	0	-		0	0
Neftchi Baku	2019–20	Azerbaijan Premier League	1	0	0	0	0	0	-		1	0
Neftchi Baku	Total		1	0	0	0	0	0	-	-	1	0
Career total			118	0	19	0	4	0	-	-	141	0

=== International ===
Azerbaijan national team
Year	Apps	Goals
2015	1	0
Total	1	0

Statistics accurate as of match played 17 November 2015

== Honours ==
FK Baku

- Azerbaijan Premier League (1): 2008–09
- Azerbaijan Cup (2): 2009–10, 2011–12
