= Duje Baković =

Croatian footballer

Personal information
- Full name: Duje Baković
- Date of birth: 7 June 1986 (age 40)
- Place of birth: Rijeka, SFR Yugoslavia
- Height: 1.87 m (6 ft 2 in)
- Position: Defender

Youth career
- Rijeka

Senior career*
Years	Team	Apps	(Gls)
2004–2008	Rijeka	23	(0)
2005–2006	→ Orijent (loan)	22	(0)
2008–2009	Kavala	14	(0)
2009	Orijent	1	(0)
2010	Egaleo	12	(0)
2010–2011	Rijeka	32	(0)
2012	Bakı	5	(1)

International career^{‡}
2004	Croatia Under 18	3	(0)
2005	Croatia Under 19	4	(0)
2007	Croatia Under 21	4	(0)
- * Club domestic league appearances and goals as of 22 February 2013 ‡ National team caps and goals as of 27 October 2011

Duje Baković (born 7 June 1986) is a Croatian retired football defender who last played for FK Baku.

== Club career ==
Baković previously played in the Croatian First League with NK Rijeka, who sent him on loan to NK Orijent for the 2005–06 season and Greek Beta Ethniki clubs Kavala and Egaleo.
