= Maksim Andronik =

Russian footballer

Personal information
- Full name: Maksim Georgiyevich Andronik
- Date of birth: 20 February 1979 (age 47)
- Height: 1.77 m (5 ft 10 in)
- Position: Defender

Senior career*
Years	Team	Apps	(Gls)
1999–2000	FC Moldova-GAZ Chişinău	1	(0)
2003–2004	FC Unisport-Auto Chişinău	27	(0)
2004	CS Tiligul-Tiras Tiraspol	4	(0)
2004–2009	FC Dacia Chişinău	116	(1)
2010	FC Sibiryak Bratsk	6	(0)
- * Club domestic league appearances and goals

Maksim Georgiyevich Andronik (Russian: Максим Георгиевич Андроник; born 20 February 1979) is a former Russian professional football player. He also holds Moldovan citizenship.
