= Ramal Huseynov =

Azerbaijani footballer (born 1984)

Ramal Hüseynov
Personal information
- Full name: Ramal Məhəmməd oğlu Hüseynov
- Date of birth: 16 December 1984 (age 41)
- Place of birth: Hayrabolu, Turkey
- Height: 1.70 m (5 ft 7 in)
- Position: Midfielder

Team information
- Current team: Arhavispor
- Number: 17

Senior career*
Years	Team	Apps	(Gls)
1998–1999	FC Shahdag Qusar		
1999–2004	Shafa Baku	29	(2)
2004–2006	PFC Turan Tovuz		
2006–2007	FK Karabakh	21	(1)
2007–2009	FK Baku	16	(0)
2008	→ Neftchi Baku PFC (loan)	3	(0)
2009	Kocaelispor	1	(1)
2009–2010	FK Standard Sumgayit	15	(0)
2010–2011	FC Kəpəz	24	(0)
2011–2012	PFC Turan Tovuz	16	(0)
2012–2014	Qaradağ	44	(0)
2014	Araz-Naxçıvan	9	(0)
2014–2015	Qaradağ		
2015–2016	Arhavispor	11	(0)

International career
2001	Azerbaijan	1	(0)
- * Club domestic league appearances and goals as of 13 January 2016

Ramal Məhəmməd oğlu Hüseynov (Azerbaijani: Ramal Hüseynov; born 16 December 1984 in Hayrabolu, Turkey), is an Azerbaijan footballer who plays for Arhavispor.

== Career ==
Huseynov was made a free agent when Araz-Naxçıvan folded and withdrew from the Azerbaijan Premier League on 17 November 2014.

== National team statistics ==
Azerbaijan national team
Year	Apps	Goals
2001	1	0
Total	1	0
