= Stanislav Bachev =

Bulgarian footballer

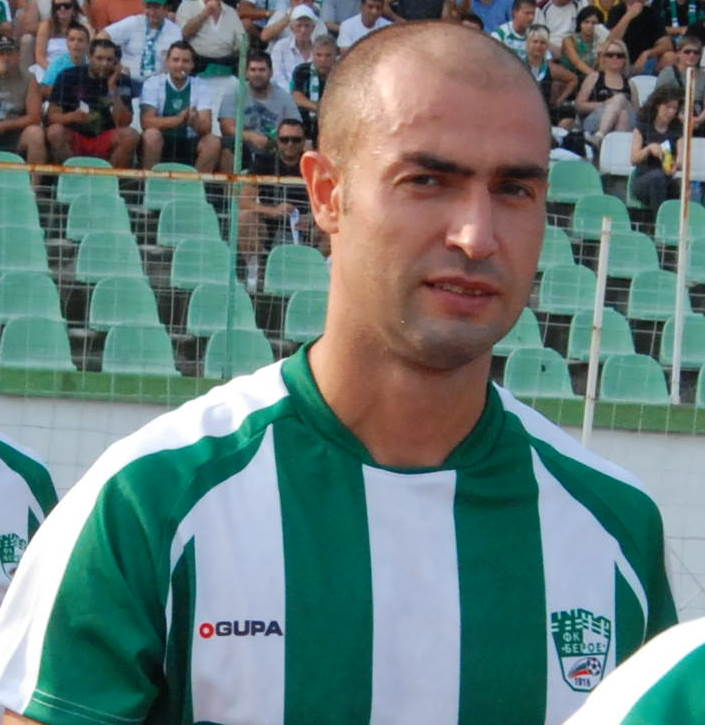

Personal information
- Full name: Stanislav Venchov Bachev
- Date of birth: 30 January 1978 (age 48)
- Place of birth: Blagoevgrad, Bulgaria
- Height: 1.81 m (5 ft 11 in)
- Positions: Centre back; left back

Senior career*
Years	Team	Apps	(Gls)
1997–2000	Pirin Blagoevgrad	33	(0)
2000–2005	Litex Lovech	74	(1)
2006–2007	Marek Dupnitsa	17	(0)
2007–2009	FK Baku	22	(2)
2009–2011	Beroe Stara Zagora	49	(4)
2012–2014	Pirin Blagoevgrad	47	(6)
Total		242	(13)
- * Club domestic league appearances and goals

Stanislav Bachev (Bulgarian: Станислав Бачев; born 30 January 1978) is a former Bulgarian footballer who played as a defender.

In his career, he played for Pirin Blagoevgrad, Litex Lovech, with which he won two times the Bulgarian Cup, Marek Dupnitsa, FK Baku, with which he became a champion of Azerbaijan Premier League for 2008–09 season, and Beroe Stara Zagora .

== Honours ==
=== Club ===
- Litex Lovech
  - Bulgarian Cup:
    - Winner (2): 2000–01, 2003–04
- FK Baku
  - Premier League:
    - Winner: 2008–09
- Beroe
  - Bulgarian Cup:
    - Winner: 2009–10
