= Ruslan Levyha =

Ukrainian footballer

Personal information
- Full name: Ruslan Ivanovych Levyha
- Date of birth: 31 January 1983 (age 43)
- Place of birth: Kupiansk, Ukrainian SSR
- Height: 1.85 m (6 ft 1 in)
- Position: Forward

Youth career
- 1999: Svitanok Kharkiv
- 1999–2000: Shakhtar Donetsk

Senior career*
Years	Team	Apps	(Gls)
2000–2007	Shakhtar Donetsk	0	(0)
2000–2003	→ Shakhtar-3 Donetsk	60	(18)
2001–2003	→ Shakhtar-2 Donetsk	51	(10)
2003	→ Metalurh-2 Donetsk (loan)	6	(1)
2004	→ Arsenal Kyiv (loan)	0	(0)
2004	→ Arsenal-2 Kyiv (loan)	1	(0)
2004	→ Sokol Saratov (loan)	10	(0)
2005	→ Borysfen Boryspil (loan)	11	(3)
2005–2006	→ Illichivets Mariupol (loan)	23	(3)
2007	→ Vorskla Poltava (loan)	15	(0)
2008–2010	Chornomorets Odesa	54	(6)
2010	Tobol	11	(1)
2011	Baku	13	(0)
2012–2013	Olimpik Donetsk	26	(8)
2013–2014	Naftovyk-Ukrnafta Okhtyrka	40	(6)
2016	Velyka Bahachka		
2017	Solli Plyus Kharkiv		

International career
2003	Ukraine U21	3	(1)
- * Club domestic league appearances and goals

Ruslan Ivanovych Levyha (Ukrainian: Руслан Іванович Левига; born 31 January 1983) is a Ukrainian football forward.

== Career ==
He played for Persha Liha side FC Naftovyk-Ukrnafta Okhtyrka.

He previously played for Chornomorets in the Ukrainian Premier League, a club he joined in January 2008, FC Tobol of the Kazakhstan Premier League and FK Baku of the Azerbaijan Premier League.

In February 2011, Levyha signed for Azerbaijan Premier League side FK Baku.

Levyha was injured in a road traffic accident on 6 October 2014, which killed his FC Naftovyk-Ukrnafta Assistant Manager Serhiy Zakarlyuka. On 6 March 2020, Levyha was sentenced to 4-years in jail.
