= Anatoli Ponomarev =

Azerbaijani footballer (born 1982)

Personal information
- Full name: Anatoli Igorevich Ponomarev
- Date of birth: 12 June 1982 (age 44)
- Place of birth: Baku, Azerbaijan SSR
- Position: Forward

Senior career*
Years	Team	Apps	(Gls)
1998	Reymersholms IK	58	(36)
1999–2000	Djurgårdens IF	0	(0)
2000	→ IK Sirius (loan)	10	(3)
2001	Vallentuna BK	10	(12)
2002	Essinge IK	12	(4)
2002–2003	Mallorca B	?	(?)
2003	Skoda Xanthi	5	(0)
2003–2004	Inter Baku	25	(17)
2004–2005	FK Qarabağ	15	(9)
2005–2006	Kalmar FF	13	(3)
2006–2007	FC Vaduz	10	(6)
2007	GAIS	10	(4)
2007	Östers IF	16	(2)
2007–2008	FK Baku	7	(4)
2008	Degerfors IF	11	(6)
2009–2010	Vasalunds IF	13	(4)
2010	Orduspor	10	(3)

International career
2004–2008	Azerbaijan	16	(1)
- * Club domestic league appearances and goals

Anatoli Igorevich Ponomarev (born 12 June 1982) is an Azerbaijani former professional footballer who played as a forward.

== Club career ==
Ponomarev began his career in 1998 with Swedish club Reymersholms IK. He has also played in Sweden for Djurgårdens IF, IK Sirius, Vallentuna BK, Essinge IK, Kalmar FF, GAIS, Östers IF, Degerfors IF and Vasalunds IF, in Spain for RCD Mallorca B, in Greece for Skoda Xanthi, in Azerbaijan for Inter Baku, FK Qarabağ and FK Baku and in Switzerland for FC Vaduz. He last played for Orduspor in Turkey.

From Djurgården, he was loaned out to IK Sirius during the 2000 season.

While playing in Sweden, Ponomarev was relegated three times in three seasons – Östers IF (2007), Degerfors IF (2008) and Vasalunds IF (2009).

== International career ==
Ponomarev has made 16 appearances for the Azerbaijan national team.

== Personal life ==
His father is Igor Ponomaryov.

== Career statistics ==
Appearances and goals by national team and year

National team	Year	Apps	Goals
Azerbaijan	2004	9	1
Azerbaijan	2005	3	0
Azerbaijan	2006	0	0
Azerbaijan	2007	1	0
Azerbaijan	2008	3	0
Total		16	1

International goals

#	Date	Venue	Opponent	Score	Result	Competition
1.	8 August 2004	Amman, Jordan	Jordan	1–1	1–1	Friendly
