= Floribert Ndayisaba =

Burundian footballer (born 1989)

Personal information
- Full name: Floribert Tambwe Ndayisaba
- Date of birth: 12 August 1989 (age 37)
- Place of birth: Bujumbura, Burundi
- Height: 1.75 m (5 ft 9 in)
- Position: Centre-back

Youth career
- 2001–2003: Chanic FC

Senior career*
Years	Team	Apps	(Gls)
2004	Chanic FC	20	(7)
2005–2008	Vital'O F.C.	54	(9)
2008–2009	FK Baku	0	(0)
2009–2011	Fantastique Bujumbura		
2011–2012	Rayon Sports		
2012–2013	A.F.C. Leopards		
2013	Shark 11		
2014–2015	Bidco United		
2015–2017	Vital'O FC		
2017–2018	LLB Académic FC		
2018–2020	AS Inter Star		

International career
2006–2012	Burundi	26	(1)
- * Club domestic league appearances and goals as of 3 April 2014

Floribert Tambwe Ndayisaba (born 12 August 1989) is a Burundian former professional footballer who played as a centre-back.

== Club career ==
Ndayisaba began his career with Chanic FC before signing for Vital'O F.C. in 2005. In the summer of 2008 Ndayisaba signed for FK Baku in Azerbaijan, and was part of the squad that won the 2008–09 Azerbaijan Premier League, although he didn't make a league appearance for Baku.

In June 2012 Ndayisaba signed for A.F.C. Leopards for Sh1.8 million from Rayon Sports on an 18-month contract, before going to Oman with Allan Wanga for a trial with Al-Nasr in January 2013. Having not secured a deal in Oman, Ndayisaba left Leopards in the summer with six months remaining on his contract, moving to Democratic Republic of Congo Division One side Shark 11.

Ndayisaba signed with Bidco United for the 2014 Kenyan National Super League season.

== International career ==
Ndayisaba made 26 appearances for the Burundi national team.
