= Ilgar Abdurahmanov =

Azerbaijani footballer (born 1979)

Personal information
- Full name: Ilgar Shair oglu Abdurahmanov
- Date of birth: 27 March 1979 (age 47)
- Place of birth: Baku, Azerbaijani SSR
- Height: 1.81 m (5 ft 11 1/2 in)
- Position: Midfielder

Senior career*
Years	Team	Apps	(Gls)
1998	Shafa Baku	2	(0)
1999	KAMAZ-Chally Nab. Chelny	22	(3)
2000	Belshina Bobruisk	2	(0)
2001	Anzhi Makhachkala	2	(0)
2002	Chernomorets Novorossiysk	0	(0)
2003	Anzhi Makhachkala	0	(0)
2004	Zhenis Astana	28	(3)
2004–2005	Khazar Lankaran	13	(0)
2005–2006	MKT Araz	8	(1)
2006–2007	Simurq	0	(0)
2007–2008	FK Baku	8	(0)
2008–2009	Mughan	11	(0)
2010	Energiya Volzhsky	8	(0)
2011–2014	Bakılı	35	(5)

International career
2004–2005	Azerbaijan	7	(0)
- * Club domestic league appearances and goals

Ilgar Abdurahmanov (born 27 March 1979) is an Azerbaijani former professional football player.
