= Dejan Branković =

Serbian footballer

Personal information
- Full name: Dejan Branković
- Date of birth: August 29, 1980 (age 46)
- Place of birth: Niš, SFR Yugoslavia
- Height: 1.90 m (6 ft 3 in)
- Position: Central defender

Team information
- Current team: Trayal Kruševac (manager)

Youth career
- Svrljig

Senior career*
Years	Team	Apps	(Gls)
2001–2002	Vlasina	18	(1)
2002–2006	Vardar	84	(6)
2006–2008	OFK Beograd	3	(0)
2008–2009	FC Baku	16	(0)
2009–2010	JJK	5	(0)

Managerial career
- 2019-2021: Serbia U-17
- 2021-2022: Serbia U-19
- 2024-: Trayal Kruševac
- * Club domestic league appearances and goals

Dejan Branković (Serbian Cyrillic: Дејан Бранковић, born August 29, 1980) is a Serbian football manager and former player.
