= Asen Nikolov (footballer) =

Bulgarian footballer

Personal information
- Date of birth: 5 August 1976 (age 50)
- Place of birth: Plovdiv, Bulgaria
- Height: 1.76 m (5 ft 9 1/2 in)
- Position: Midfielder

Youth career
- Maritsa Plovdiv

Senior career*
Years	Team	Apps	(Gls)
1994–1997	Maritsa Plovdiv	65	(13)
1997–2001	Levski Sofia	67	(5)
2002–2004	Slavia Sofia	68	(5)
2005–2006	Turan Tovuz	39	(13)
2006–2007	Partizan	2	(0)
2007–2008	Baku	4	(0)
2008	Gabala	10	(1)
2009–2010	Slavia Sofia	12	(0)
2010	US Le Pontet	4	(0)
Total		271	(37)

International career
1999	Bulgaria	1	(0)
- * Club domestic league appearances and goals

Asen Nikolov (Bulgarian: Асен Николов; born 5 August 1976) is a Bulgarian retired footballer who played as an attacking midfielder.

Nicknamed Bebeto (Бебето), Nikolov was capped one time for the Bulgaria national team.

== Career ==
After spending the first three years of his career in his hometown with Maritsa, Nikolov relocated to Sofia in June 1997, signing a five-year contract with Levski, with whom he was Champion of Bulgaria two times (2000, 2001) and won Bulgarian Cup in 1998 and 2000.

In January 2002, Slavia Sofia signed Nikolov to a four-year deal. In Slavia he earned 68 appearances playing in the A PFG and scored five goals, before moving to Turan Tovuz in Azerbaijan, where he has established himself as one of the best players in the country.

In August 2006, Nikolov signed a three-year contract with Serbian club Partizan at the request of the manager, Miodrag Ješić, who noticed his talent while working in Bulgaria. Yet, on 20 September 2006, just one month after the transfer was made and with only several games played for the club, Nikolov was substituted in the 38th minute of the Serbian Cup game against ČSK Čelarevo, because of "extremely low performance, physical capacity of an aged man and being a bad influence on the team spirit". Ješić has also said that it was "definitely the last game Nikolov had played for Partizan".

In the next season he returned to Azerbaijan, signing a contract with Baku. After that played six months and in Gabala. In January 2009, the 32-year-old Nikolov returned to Bulgaria and signed with Slavia Sofia.

== Honours ==
Levski Sofia

- Bulgarian A PFG: 1999–2000, 2000–01, 2001–02
- Bulgarian Cup: 1998, 2000, 2002
