= Aleksandre Gogoberishvili =

Georgian footballer

Aleksandr Gogoberishvili
Personal information
- Date of birth: 16 February 1977 (age 49)
- Place of birth: Tbilisi, Georgian SSR, Soviet Union
- Height: 1.83 m (6 ft 0 in)
- Position: Midfielder

Senior career*
Years	Team	Apps	(Gls)
1992–1993	Rkoni Kaspi	8	(0)
1994–1995	Dinamo Tbilisi	1	(0)
1995	Shevardeni Tbilisi	6	(0)
1996	Guria Lanchkhuti	11	(1)
1996–1997	Merani Tbilisi	34	(3)
1997	Dinamo Tbilisi	15	(3)
1998	Lokomotivi Tbilisi	13	(7)
1999–2000	Anzhi Makhachkala	10	(0)
2000–2001	WIT Georgia	32	(7)
2002–2004	Dinamo Tbilisi	66	(10)
2004	Lokomotivi Tbilisi	14	(3)
2005–2008	Baku	74	(7)
2008	Qarabağ	4	(0)
2009	Olimpik Baku	13	(1)
2009–2010	Sioni Bolnisi	28	(6)
2010	Baia Zugdidi	9	(0)
2011	Sioni Bolnisi	17	(1)
2011–2012	Turan Tovuz	32	(4)
2012–2013	Guria Lanchkhuti	28	(14)
2013–2016	Sioni Bolnisi	79	(4)
2016	Imereti Khoni		
2017	Shevardeni-1906 Tbilisi		
2017–2018	Norchi Dinamo Tbilisi	26	(0)

International career
2001–2005	Georgia	5	(0)
- * Club domestic league appearances and goals

Aleksandr Gogoberishvili (Georgian: ალექსანდრე გოგობერიშვილი; born 16 February 1977) is a Georgian former footballer.

== Career statistics ==
Season	Club	League	League		Cup		Other		Continental		Total	
Season	Club	League	App	Goals	App	Goals	App	Goals	App	Goals	App	Goals
1993–94	Dinamo Tbilisi	Umaglesi Liga	1	0			-		0	0	1	0
1994–95	Shevardeni Tbilisi	Umaglesi Liga	6	0			-		-		6	0
1995–96	Guria Lanchkhuti	Umaglesi Liga	11	1			-		-		11	1
1996–97	Merani-91 Tbilisi	Umaglesi Liga	26	0			-		-		26	0
1997–98	Dinamo Tbilisi	Umaglesi Liga	15	3					-		15	3
1998–99	Lokomotivi Tbilisi	Umaglesi Liga	13	7			-		-		13	7
1999	Anzhi Makhachkala	RNFL	8	0			-		-		8	0
2000	Anzhi Makhachkala	RFPL	2	0			-		-		2	0
2000–01	Georgia Tbilisi	Umaglesi Liga	14	0			-		0	0	14	0
2001–02	Georgia Tbilisi	Umaglesi Liga	18	7			-		3	1	21	8
2001–02	Dinamo Tbilisi	Umaglesi Liga	8	1			-		-		8	1
2002–03	Dinamo Tbilisi	Umaglesi Liga	30	3			-		4	0	34	3
2003–04	Dinamo Tbilisi	Umaglesi Liga	28	6			-		2	0	30	6
2004–05	Lokomotivi Tbilisi	Umaglesi Liga	14	3			-		-		14	3
2004–05	Baku	Azerbaijan Premier League	11	2			-		-		11	2
2005–06	Baku	Azerbaijan Premier League	26	3			-		2	0	28	3
2006–07	Baku	Azerbaijan Premier League	18	1			-		0	0	18	1
2007–08	Baku	Azerbaijan Premier League	19	1			-				19	1
2008–09	Karabakh	Azerbaijan Premier League	4	0			-		-		4	0
2008–09	Olimpik Baku	Azerbaijan Premier League	13	1			-		0	0	13	1
2009–10	Sioni Bolnisi	Umaglesi Liga	28	6	2	0	-		-		30	6
2010–11	Baia Zugdidi	Umaglesi Liga	9	0			-		-		9	0
2010–11	Sioni Bolnisi	Umaglesi Liga	17	1			-		-		17	1
2011–12	Turan Tovuz	Azerbaijan Premier League	30	4	-		-		-		30	4
2012–13	Turan Tovuz	Azerbaijan Premier League	2	0	-		-		-		2	0
2012–13	Guria Lanchkhuti	Pirveli Liga	28	14	4	0	-		-		32	14
2013–14	Sioni Bolnisi	Umaglesi Liga	30	3	6	1	-		-		36	4
2014–15	Sioni Bolnisi	Umaglesi Liga	0	0	0	0	-		1	0	1	0
Total	Georgia		296	55	12	1	-		10	1	318	57
Total	Russia		10	0			-		-		10	0
Total	Azerbaijan		123	12			-		2	0	125	12
Career total			429	67	12	1			12	1	453	69

== Honors ==
FC Baku

- Azerbaijan Premier League: 2005–06
