= Elvin Aliyev (footballer, born 1984) =

Azerbaijani footballer (born 1984)

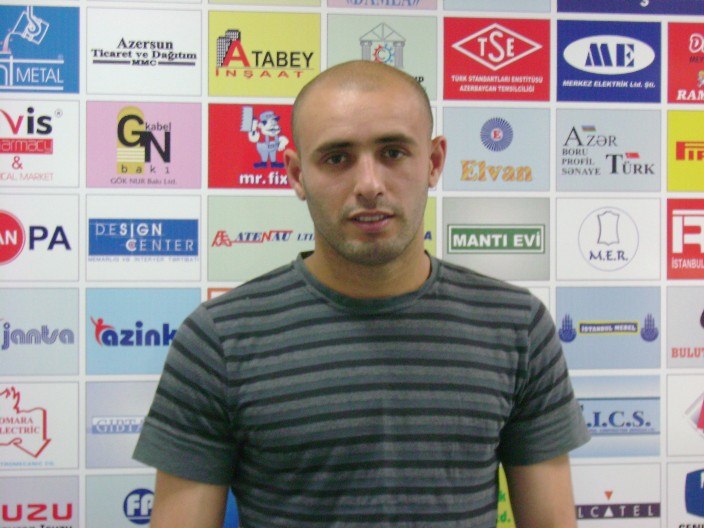

Personal information
- Full name: Elvin Fizuli oglu Aliyev
- Date of birth: 21 August 1984 (age 42)
- Place of birth: Sabirabad, Soviet Union
- Height: 1.78 m (5 ft 10 in)
- Position: Defender

Team information
- Current team: FC Baku
- Number: 14

Senior career*
Years	Team	Apps	(Gls)
1999–2000	Neftgaz Baku	?	(?)
2001	Neftchi Baku	0	(0)
2002–2003	Karat Baku	?	(?)
2004–2005	MOIK Baku	?	(?)
2005–2006	Neftchi Baku	7	(0)
2006–2007	Olimpik Baku	20	(0)
2007	MKT Araz	?	(?)
2007–2008	Olimpik Baku	23	(0)
2008–2015	FC Baku	67	(0)
2010–2011	→ AZAL (loan)	27	(0)
2015–	Ravan Baku	4	(0)

International career^{‡}
2007–	Azerbaijan	4	(0)
- * Club domestic league appearances and goals as of 22 December 2015 ‡ National team caps and goals as of 23 June 2009

Elvin Aliyev (Azerbaijani: Elvin Əliyev; born 21 August 1984) is an Azerbaijani footballer who plays as defender for FC Baku.
