= Marko Šarlija =

Croatian footballer

Personal information
- Date of birth: 31 January 1982 (age 44)
- Place of birth: Zagreb, SR Croatia, SFR Yugoslavia
- Height: 1.88 m (6 ft 2 in)
- Position: Goalkeeper

Senior career*
Years	Team	Apps	(Gls)
2001–2004	Dinamo Zagreb	8	(0)
2002–2003	→ Zadar (loan)	23	(0)
2004–2005	Inter Zaprešić	17	(0)
2005–2007	Dinamo Zagreb	0	(0)
2007–2008	Inter Zaprešić	15	(0)
2008–2012	FK Baku	107	(0)
2012–2013	Ethnikos Achna	10	(0)
2013–2015	Lokomotiva	14	(0)
2015–2017	Sesvete	76	(0)

International career
1997–1998	Croatia U15	6	(0)
1999	Croatia U16	1	(0)
1998–1999	Croatia U17	13	(0)
1999–2000	Croatia U18	3	(0)
1999–2000	Croatia U19	9	(0)
2000–2002	Croatia U20	8	(0)
2002–2004	Croatia U21	13	(0)
- * Club domestic league appearances and goals as of 22 December 2017

Marko Šarlija (born 31 January 1982 in Zagreb), is a Croatian football goalkeeper who last played for NK Sesvete.

== Playing career ==
Šarlija started out at local club Dinamo Zagreb. He made eight appearances in the Prva HNL during this stint, and spent the 2002–2003 season on loan at NK Zadar, making 23 appearances. He also made 23 appearances over two spells at Inter Zaprešić before moving, in 2008, to FK Baku. Now he play for Ethnikos Achna

He was also a member of the Croatian squad for the 2004 UEFA European Under-21 Football Championship

== Honours ==
FK Baku

- Azerbaijan Cup: 2012
