= Ahmad Tijani =

Nigerian footballer

Personal information
- Full name: Əhməd Ticani
- Date of birth: November 10, 1987 (age 39)
- Place of birth: Uyo, Nigeria
- Height: 1.78 m (5 ft 10 in)
- Position: Striker

Team information
- Current team: Shusha

Senior career*
Years	Team	Apps	(Gls)
2005–2007	FC Sahdag Qusar	49	(20)
2007–2010	FK Baku	52	(14)
2013–	Shusha		(7)
- * Club domestic league appearances and goals as of 08:11, 22 December 2013 (UTC)

Əhməd Ticani (born 10 November 1987) is a Nigerian football striker who plays for Shusha in the Azerbaijan First Division.

== Azerbaijan Career statistics ==
As of 19 March 2014

Club performance			League		Cup		Continental		Total	
Season	Club	League	Apps	Goals	Apps	Goals	Apps	Goals	Apps	Goals
Azerbaijan			League		Azerbaijan Cup		Europe		Total	
2005–06	Sahdag Qusar	Azerbaijan Premier League	26	15			-		25	15
2006–07	Sahdag Qusar	Azerbaijan Premier League	23	5			-		23	5
2007–08	Baku	Azerbaijan Premier League	17	7			2	0	19	7
2008–09	Baku	Azerbaijan Premier League	18	6			-		18	6
2009–10	Baku	Azerbaijan Premier League	17	1	2	1	0	0	19	2
2013–14	Shusha	Azerbaijan First Division		8	2	0	-			7
Total			101	42	4	1	2	0	107	43
