= Alexei Savinov =

Moldovan footballer

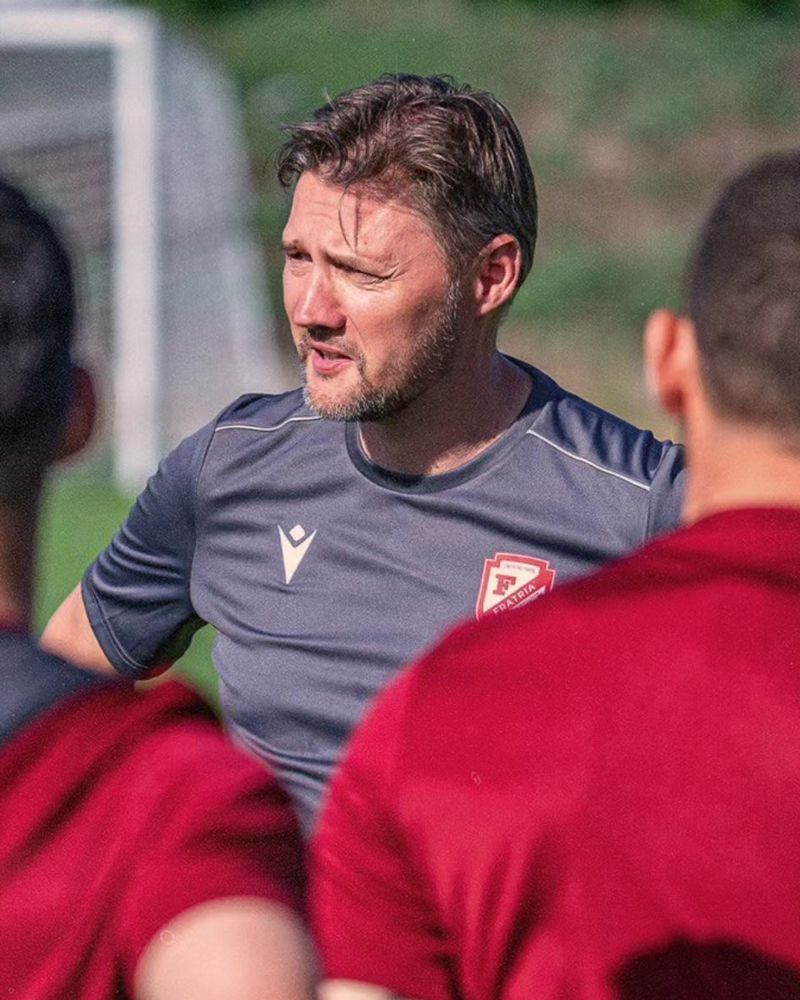
- Savinov coaching Fratria in 2025

Personal information
- Date of birth: 19 April 1979 (age 47)
- Place of birth: Chișinău, Moldovan SSR
- Height: 1.87 m (6 ft 2 in)
- Positions: Centre back; defensive midfielder

Senior career*
| Years | Team | Apps | (Gls) |
| 1997–1998 | Victoria Cahul | 6 | (0) |
| 1998–1999 | Zimbru Chișinău | 0 | (0) |
| 1999–2000 | Olimpia Bălți | 31 | (2) |
| 2001 | Haiducul Sporting Hînceşti | 13 | (2) |
| 2001–2006 | Metalurh Zaporizhzhia | 27 | (1) |
| 2003 | → Metalurh-2 Zaporizhzhia | 10 | (0) |
| 2004 | → Volyn Lutsk (loan) | 4 | (0) |
| 2004 | → Ikva Mlyniv (loan) | 1 | (0) |
| 2004–2005 | → Zakarpattia Uzhhorod (loan) | 44 | (1) |
| 2006 | → Volyn Lutsk (loan) | 1 | (0) |
| 2006–2008 | Zimbru Chișinău | 21 | (2) |
| 2008 | Dacia Chișinău | 5 | (0) |
| 2008–2012 | Baku | 60 | (1) |
| 2013–2014 | Costuleni | 12 | (0) |
| 2014 | Veris Chișinău | 3 | (0) |

International career
| 2003–2011 | Moldova | 36 | (0) |

Managerial career
- 2014: Costuleni (assistant)
- 2014: Veris Chișinău
- 2015: Sheriff Tiraspol (assistant)
- 2017: Spicul Chișcăreni
- 2020: Codru Lozova (assistant)
- 2021: Codru Lozova
- 2021: Atletic Strășeni
- 2021–2022: Sfîntul Gheorghe (assistant)
- 2022–2023: Petrocub Hîncești
- 2025–2026: Fratria
- 2026: Milsami Orhei
- * Club domestic league appearances and goals

Alexei Savinov (born 19 April 1979) is a Moldovan football manager and former player.

== Playing career ==
Savinov spent his playing career in Moldova, Ukraine and Azerbaijan.

== International career ==
He played 36 matches for the Moldova national team between 2003 and 2011.

== Managerial career ==
After his retirement, he has worked as a coach in Moldova. In September 2021, he was appointed assistant coach of Sfîntul Gheorghe. In June 2022, he was appointed head coach of Petrocub Hîncești.

On 29 May 2025 he was announced as the new manager of Bulgarian Second League team Fratria.
