= Léo Rocha =

Brazilian footballer (born 1985)

Leonardo Rocha
Personal information
- Full name: Leonardo da Silva Rocha
- Date of birth: 7 March 1985 (age 41)
- Place of birth: Itaocara, Rio de Janeiro, Brazil
- Height: 1.75 m (5 ft 9 in)
- Position: Midfielder

Team information
- Current team: Spartano Futebol Clube

Senior career*
Years	Team	Apps	(Gls)
2006	Olaria	12	(4)
2007	Standard Sumgayit	24	(7)
2009	A.C.D. Lara	16	(6)
2009–2010	Inter Baku	21	(5)
2010	Baku	24	(7)
2011	Qarabağ	24	(1)
2012	Treze	12	(3)
2013	Inter Baku	24	(16)
2014	Olaria	12	(4)
2014–2015	América Mineiro	33	(8)
2016	Gifu	24	(4)
2017–	America		
- * Club domestic league appearances and goals as of 29 December 2016

Leonardo da Silva Rocha, also known as Léo Rocha (レオナルド・ダ・シルバ・ロシャ / レオ・ロシャ) born 7 March 1985 in Itaocara, Rio de Janeiro is a Brazilian footballer who plays for FC Gifu.

== Club statistics ==
Updated to 23 February 2016.

Club performance			League		Cup		Total	
Season	Club	League	Apps	Goals	Apps	Goals	Apps	Goals
Japan/Brazil			League		Emperor's Cup		Total	
2006	Olaria Atlético Clube	Série C	12	4	–		12	4
2007	FK Standard Sumgayit	Azerbaijan First Division	24	7	–		24	7
2009	Deportivo Lara	Venezuelan Segunda División	16	6	–		16	6
2009–10	Inter Baku PIK	Azerbaijan Premier League	0	0	–		0	0
2009–10	FC Baku	Azerbaijan Premier League	24	7	–		24	7
2010–11	Qarabağ FK	Azerbaijan Premier League	24	1	–		24	1
2011	Treze Futebol Clube	Série D	12	3	–		12	3
2011–12	Inter Baku PIK	Azerbaijan Premier League	24	16	–		24	16
2013	Olaria Atlético Clube	Série C	12	4	–		12	4
2014	América MG	Série B	27	6	–		27	6
2015	América MG	Série B	7	2	–		7	2
2016	FC Gifu	J2 League	0	0	0	0	0	0
Career total			0	0	0	0	0	0
