= Fábio Luís Ramim =

Azerbaijani footballer (born 1981)

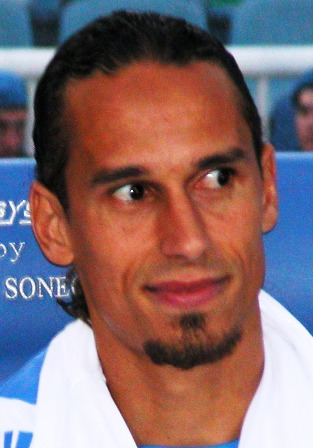

Personal information
- Full name: Fábio Luís Ramim
- Date of birth: 10 April 1981 (age 45)
- Place of birth: São Paulo, Brazil
- Height: 1.78 m (5 ft 10 in)
- Position: Midfielder

Team information
- Current team: Rio Preto

Senior career*
Years	Team	Apps	(Gls)
2004–2005	Linense		
2005–2006	MKT Araz	42	(9)
2006–2008	Olimpik Baku	35	(6)
2008–2012	Baku	72	(12)
2013–	Rio Preto		

International career^{‡}
2008–2012	Azerbaijan	16	(4)
- * Club domestic league appearances and goals as of 24 February 2014 ‡ National team caps and goals as of 9 April 2014

Fábio Luís Ramim (born 10 April 1981 in São Paulo, Brazil) is a professional football midfielder, who plays for Rio Preto. Born in Brazil, he represented the Azerbaijan national team.

== Career ==
=== Club ===
In February 2005, Fabio signed for MKT Araz in the Azerbaijan Top League, a move that three years later, after moving to Olimpik Baku in the winter of 2006, saw him take Azerbaijani citizenship and choose to represent Azerbaijan internationally. Fabio moved to Baku in the summer of 2008 before leaving in the winter of the 2011–12 season.

=== International career ===
After moving to Azerbaijan in 2005, Fabio took Azerbaijani citizenship making him eligible to play for Azerbaijan. Fabio made his debut in a friendly against Bosnia and Herzegovina, on 1 June 2008, and went on to make 16 appearances, scoring 4 goals.

== Career statistics ==
=== Club ===
Club statistics
Season	Club	League	League		Cup		Other		Total	
Season	Club	League	App	Goals	App	Goals	App	Goals	App	Goals
2004–05	MKT Araz	Azerbaijan Top League	13	4			—		13	4
2005–06	MKT Araz	Azerbaijan Top League	23	5					23	5
2006–07	MKT Araz	Azerbaijan Top League	6	0			—		6	0
2006–07	Olimpik Baku	Azerbaijan Top League	12	3			—		12	3
2007–08	Olimpik Baku	Azerbaijan Top League	23	3			—		23	3
2008–09	Baku	Azerbaijan Top League	22	7			—		22	7
2009–10	Baku	Azerbaijan Top League	21	4	3	1	4	0	28	5
2010–11	Baku	Azerbaijan Top League	24	1	4	1	2	0	30	2
2011–12	Baku	Azerbaijan Top League	5	0	1	0	—		6	0
Career total			149	27	8	2	6	0	163	29

=== International ===
Azerbaijan
Year	Apps	Goals
2008	5	2
2009	6	1
2010	4	1
2011	1	0
Total	16	4

Statistics accurate as of 10 August 2011

=== International goals ===
#	Date	Venue	Opponent	Score	Result	Competition
1.	4 June 2008	Estadi Comunal d'Aixovall, Andorra la Vella, Andorra	Andorra	1-0	1–0	Friendly
2.	21 August 2008	Laugardalsvöllur, Reykjavík, Iceland	Iceland	1-0	1–1	Friendly
3.	1 February 2009	Al-Maktoum Stadium, Dubai, UAE	Uzbekistan	1-0	1–1	Friendly
4.	25 February 2010	King Abdullah Stadium, Amman, Jordan	Jordan	1-0	2–0	Friendly
Correct as of 25 February 2010

== Honours ==
=== Club ===
FK Baku

- Azerbaijan Premier League: (1) 2008–09
- Azerbaijan Cup: (2) 2009–10, 2011–12
