= Rafael Amirbekov =

Azerbaijani footballer (born 1976)

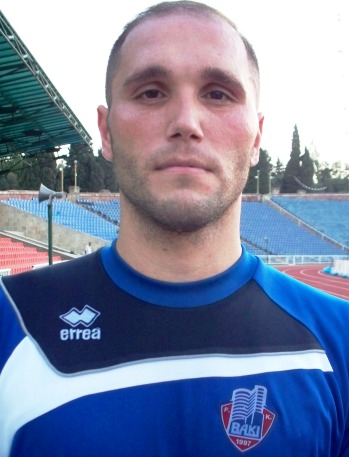

Personal information
- Full name: Rafael Ramazan oglu Amirbekov
- Date of birth: 23 February 1976 (age 50)
- Place of birth: Qusar, Soviet Union
- Height: 1.82 m (5 ft 11 1/2 in)
- Position: Defender

Youth career
- 1983–1996: Şahdağ Qusar

Senior career*
Years	Team	Apps	(Gls)
1996–1997	Färid Baku	20	(1)
1997–1998	Bakili Baku	21	(1)
1998–1999	Dinamo Baku	16	(0)
2000–2001	Dinamo Bakili Baki	15	(0)
2001–2003	Käpäz Gäncä		
2003–2004	Tractor Sazi F.C.		
2004–2011	FK Baku	76	(1)
2010	→ Käpäz Gäncä (loan)	8	(0)

International career
2004–2008	Azerbaijan	18	(0)
- * Club domestic league appearances and goals

Rafael Amirbekov (born 23 February 1976, in Qusar) is a retired Azerbaijani professional footballer who last played for FK Baku. He is a defender.

== Playing career ==
On 27 August 2009 Amirbekov played for FK Baku in their 5–1 defeat to FC Basel in the Europa League.

Amirbekov is the captain of FK Baku.

== National team statistics ==
Azerbaijan national team
Year	Apps	Goals
2004	8	0
2005	9	0
2006	0	0
2007	0	0
2008	1	0
Total	18	0

== Honours ==
FC Baku

- Azerbaijan Premier League: 2005–06
