= Ernad Skulić =

Croatian footballer

Personal information
- Date of birth: 2 May 1980 (age 46)
- Place of birth: Doboj, SFR Yugoslavia
- Height: 1.87 m (6 ft 2 in)
- Position: Midfielder

Senior career*
Years	Team	Apps	(Gls)
2000–2008	Inter Zaprešić	150	(20)
2008–2012	Baku	120	(9)
2012	Inter Zaprešić	13	(1)
2012–2013	Lučko	12	(1)
2013–2014	Achna FC	20	(2)
2014–2016	Lučko		
2016	NK Sava Drenje		
- * Club domestic league appearances and goals as of 22 September 2012

Ernad Skulić (born 2 May 1980) is a Bosnian-born Croatian retired footballer who last played for NK Sava Drenje.

== Playing career ==
Skulić started out at Inter Zaprešić, making 150 league appearances and scoring twenty goals over the span of seven seasons. He then moved, in 2008, to FK Baku, where he made over one hundred league appearances.

Skulić has also appeared for FK Baku in four UEFA Champions League matches, as well as one UEFA Europa League match.
