= Jamshid Maharramov =

Azerbaijani footballer (born 1983)

Jamshid Mähärrämov
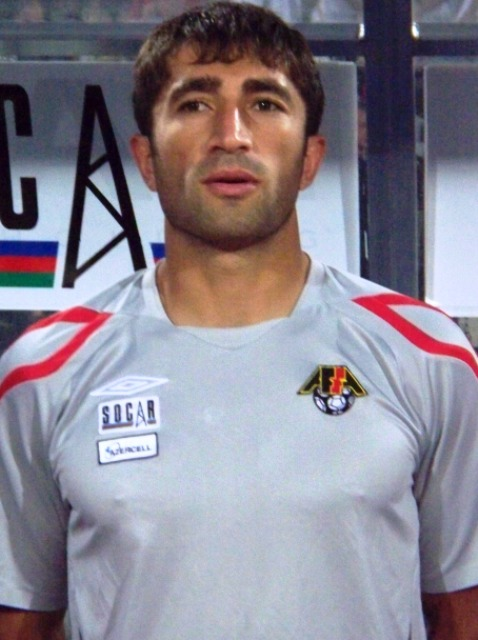

Personal information
- Full name: Jamshid Sakir oglu Mähärrämov
- Date of birth: 4 August 1983 (age 43)
- Place of birth: Aghdam, Azerbaijani SSR
- Height: 1.74 m (5 ft 9 in)
- Position: Midfielder

Senior career*
Years	Team	Apps	(Gls)
2003–2004	MOIK Baku	35	(0)
2004–2007	Karvan	36	(2)
2007–2013	Baku	126	(1)
2013	Kəpəz	9	(0)
2013–2014	Ravan Baku	29	(0)
2014–2015	Baku	13	(0)
2015	Adanaspor	6	(0)
2015–2017	Ravan Baku	32	(2)

International career^{‡}
2007–2009	Azerbaijan	5	(0)
- * Club domestic league appearances and goals as of 30 June 2018 ‡ National team caps and goals as of 12 June 2008

Jamshid Maharramov (Azerbaijani: Cəmşid Məhərrəmov; born 4 August 1983) is a former Azerbaijani footballer who played as a midfielder.

== Career ==
=== Club ===
In August 2013, Maharramov signed for Ravan Baku from Kəpəz, moving to Adanaspor in January 2015.

== Match-fixing allegations ==
In 2017, Maharramov was suspended for life from professional football by the AFFA for alleged involvement in match fixing. In December 2019, Maharramov was arrested in relation to the match fixing allegations.

== Career statistics ==
As of end of 2016–17 season

Appearances and goals by club, season and competition
Club	Season	League			National Cup		Continental		Other		Total	
Club	Season	Division	Apps	Goals	Apps	Goals	Apps	Goals	Apps	Goals	Apps	Goals
MOIK Baku	2003–04	Top League	18	0			-		-		18	0
MOIK Baku	2004–05	Top League	17	0			-		-		17	0
MOIK Baku	Total		35	0			-	-	-	-	35	0
FK Karvan	2004–05	Top League	11	1			-		-		11	1
FK Karvan	2005–06	Top League	9	0			2	0	-		11	0
FK Karvan	2006–07	Top League	16	1			3	0	-		19	1
FK Karvan	Total		36	2			5	0	-	-	41	2
Baku	2007–08	Premier League	21	1			2	0	-		23	1
Baku	2008–09	Premier League	22	0			-		-		22	0
Baku	2009–10	Premier League	20	0	4	0	1	0	-		25	0
Baku	2010–11	Premier League	30	0	4	0	1	0	-		35	0
Baku	2011–12	Premier League	25	0	4	0	-		-		29	0
Baku	2012–13	Premier League	8	0	0	0	1	0	-		9	0
Baku	Total		126	1	12	0	5	0	-	-	143	1
Kapaz	2012–13	Premier League	9	0	0	0	–		–		9	0
Ravan Baku	2013–14	Premier League	29	0	4	0	–		–		33	0
Baku	2014–15	Premier League	12	0	1	0	–		–		13	0
Adanaspor	2014–15	TFF First League	6	0	0	0	–		–		6	0
Ravan Baku	2015–16	Premier League	20	0	1	0	–		–		21	0
Ravan Baku	2016–17	First Division	12	2	0	0	–		–		12	2
Ravan Baku	Total		32	2	1	0	-	-	-	-	33	2
Career total			285	5	18	0	10	0	-	-	313	5

=== International ===
Azerbaijan national team
Year	Apps	Goals
2007	2	0
2008	0	0
2009	3	0
Total	5	0
