= Hafiz Mammadov =

Azerbaijani businessman

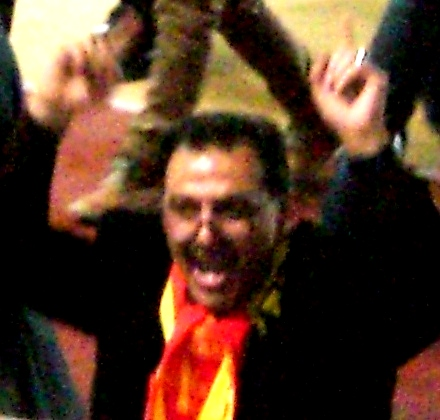
- Born: Hafiz Majid oglu Mammadov; 2 December 1964 (age 60); Nakhchivan, Azerbaijan
- Occupation(s): Founder and President of Baghlan Group

Hafiz Mammadov (Azerbaijani: Hafiz Məmmədov; born 2 December 1964 in Nakhchivan, in Azerbaijan) is an Azerbaijani businessman who founded and owns the Baghlan Group. He used to own football clubs FC Baku and RC Lens.

== Biography ==
Hafiz Mammadov founded the Baghlan Group in 1998 in Azerbaijan. The Baghlan Group is a company that specialises in oil, gas, construction and transportation, mainly in Azerbaijan. Though not related, Hafiz's very strong links to the family of the controversial former transport minister, Ziya Mammadov, has been cited as one of Baghlan's major commercial advantages allowing the group to grow enormously and for Hafiz Mammadov to become a multi-millionaire.

== Football ==
Mammadov used his millions to invest in his passion for football. In 2004, he became owner of local football club FC Baku, a team in the Azerbaijan Premier League. In 2013, he expanded bought RC Lens in France. Lens. Wearing the Land of Fire logo, Lens gained promotion that season under Mammadov's ownership from Ligue 2 to Ligue 1.

Hafiz also owned shares in La Liga club Atlético Madrid and during the 2012–13 and 2013-14 the club enjoyed very successful seasons wearing the same Land of Fire logo.

On 10 June 2014, Mammadov agreed to take ownership of another European football club – this time it was the English Championship side Sheffield Wednesday. Mammadov looked to take over from the current Chairman Milan Mandarić. The bid for SWFC was rumoured to have been around €50 million however, at the beginning of September, due to Mammadov's failure to meet financial obligations and complete the takeover, Mandarić called the deal off despite shirts having already gone on sale bearing the Land of Fire logo.

According to former President of France François Hollande he directly intervened in favour of the Football Club of Lens.

This was due to financial difficulties in Azerbaijan which forced a number of players and personnel from Baku FC to seek new clubs, leaving the club's future uncertain.

Later that year, Mammadov's failure to provide promised investment of around £4 million to fund transfers for Lens resulted in Lens fans calling for a boycott of the club's main shirt sponsor and saw the club threatened with relegation to League 2, but while some press reports suggested Mammadov was in serious trouble, others suggested a complex web of oligarch connections might allow the situation to be salvaged.
