= 2013–14 FK Baku season =

Baku
2013-14 season
- President: Hafiz Mammadov
- Manager: Milinko Pantić
- Stadium: Tofig Bakhramov Stadium
- Premier League: 5th
- Azerbaijan Cup: Quarterfinals vs Ravan Baku
- Top goalscorer: League: Rauf Aliyev (9); All: Two Players (9)
- Highest home attendance: 1,000 vs Gabala; 2 August 2013; Ravan Baku; 18 August 2013; Neftchi Baku; 31 August 2013; Qarabağ; 15 December 2013; Neftchi Baku; 15 February 2014; Simurq; 29 March 2014
- Lowest home attendance: 200 vs Ravan Baku; 2 February 2014
- Average home league attendance: 565; 3 April 2014
Home colours	Away colours	Third colours

The Baku 2013-14 season was Baku's sixteenth Azerbaijan Premier League season. They competed in the 2013–14 Azerbaijan Premier League, finishing 5th, and reached the Quarterfinals of the 2013–14 Azerbaijan Cup where they were defeated by Ravan Baku. It was Milinko Pantićs first season as manager, having replaced Božidar Bandović on 14 June after Bandović left his position at the end of the 2012-13 season.

== Squad ==
As of 7 January 2014

Note: Flags indicate national team as defined under FIFA eligibility rules; some limited exceptions apply. Players may hold more than one non-FIFA nationality.

No.	Pos.	Nation	Player
1	GK	AZE	Aqil Mammadov
2	MF	LTU	Deividas Česnauskis
3	DF	SLO	Jure Travner
4	DF	ESP	Mario
5	DF	ESP	Rubén
6	FW	AZE	Vagif Abdullayev
7	MF	AZE	Afran Ismayilov
8	MF	AZE	Javid Huseynov
10	MF	CRO	Aleksandar Šolić
11	FW	AZE	Rauf Aliyev
12	MF	BRA	Etto
13	GK	MKD	Edin Nuredinoski
14	DF	AZE	Elvin Aliyev (vice-captain)
15	MF	ESP	Alberto Noguera
16	MF	BRA	Juninho

No.	Pos.	Nation	Player
17	MF	SRB	Risto Ristović
18	MF	ESP	Mario Rubio
19	FW	ROU	Marius Pena
20	FW	AZE	Tural Gurbatov
21	MF	AZE	Elvin Mammadov
22	FW	AZE	Namig Alasgarov
23	MF	SLO	Lucas Horvat
24	DF	CYP	Giorgos Pelagias
27	FW	AZE	Nurlan Novruzov
28	GK	AZE	Elkhan Ahmadov
30	MF	AZE	Vugar Baybalayev
31	FW	AZE	Vugar Mustafayev
34	DF	AZE	Shahriyar Aliyev
—	MF	AZE	David Alesgerov
—	FW	AZE	Mahir Madatov

=== Out on loan ===
Note: Flags indicate national team as defined under FIFA eligibility rules; some limited exceptions apply. Players may hold more than one non-FIFA nationality.

No. / Pos. / Nation / Player; 20 / MF / LTU / Mindaugas Kalonas (at Simurq)	No. / Pos. / Nation / Player

== Transfers ==
=== Summer ===
In: Note: Flags indicate national team as defined under FIFA eligibility rules; some limited exceptions apply. Players may hold more than one non-FIFA nationality.

No.	Pos.	Nation	Player
3	DF	SLO	Jure Travner (from (Slovenia) ND Mura 05)
4	DF	ESP	Mario (from (Spain) Real Betis)
5	DF	ESP	Rubén (from (Spain) Osasuna)
7	MF	AZE	Afran Ismayilov (from (Azerbaijan) Qarabağ)
12	MF	BRA	Etto (from (Greece) PAOK)
15	MF	ESP	Alberto Noguera (from (England) Blackpool)
20	MF	LTU	Mindaugas Kalonas (from (Azerbaijan) Ravan Baku)
24	DF	CYP	Giorgos Pelagias (from (Cyprus) Olympiakos Nicosia)
27	MF	AZE	Rashad Abdullayev (from (Azerbaijan) Gabala)
30	MF	AZE	Vugar Baybalayev (from (Azerbaijan) Turan Tovuz)

Out: Note: Flags indicate national team as defined under FIFA eligibility rules; some limited exceptions apply. Players may hold more than one non-FIFA nationality.

No.	Pos.	Nation	Player
2	DF	BOL	Edemir Rodríguez (to (Bolivia) Club Bolívar)
3	DF	LAT	Deniss Ivanovs
5	DF	AZE	Agil Nabiyev (to (Azerbaijan) Baku)
6	DF	SLE	Ibrahim Kargbo (to (Belgium) Brussels FC)
18	FW	AZE	Tural Gurbatov (loan to (Azerbaijan) Lokomotiv-Bilajary)
19	FW	AZE	Nurlan Novruzov (loan to (Azerbaijan) Sumgayit)
21	DF	AZE	Novruz Mammadov (to (Azerbaijan) Ravan Baku)
26	DF	AZE	Aziz Guliyev (loan to (Azerbaijan) Ravan Baku)
27	DF	GEO	George Popkhadze (to (Poland) Jagiellonia Białystok)
27	MF	AZE	Rashad Abdullayev (loan to (Azerbaijan) Ravan Baku)
28	FW	TUR	Ferdi Elmas
36	FW	CRC	Winston Parks (to (Costa Rica) Uruguay Coronado)

=== Winter ===
In: Note: Flags indicate national team as defined under FIFA eligibility rules; some limited exceptions apply. Players may hold more than one non-FIFA nationality.

No.	Pos.	Nation	Player
20	FW	AZE	Tural Gurbatov (loan return from (Azerbaijan) Lokomotiv-Bilajary)
27	FW	AZE	Nurlan Novruzov (loan return from (Azerbaijan) Sumgayit)
—	DF	AZE	Aziz Guliyev (loan return from (Azerbaijan) Ravan Baku)

Out: Note: Flags indicate national team as defined under FIFA eligibility rules; some limited exceptions apply. Players may hold more than one non-FIFA nationality.

No.	Pos.	Nation	Player
20	MF	LTU	Mindaugas Kalonas (loan to (Azerbaijan) Simurq)
27	MF	AZE	Rahman Hajiyev (to (Azerbaijan) Sumgayit)
27	MF	AZE	Rashad Abdullayev (to (Azerbaijan) AZAL previously on loan at Ravan Baku)
29	GK	AZE	Kamran Agayev (to (Azerbaijan) Gabala)
—	DF	AZE	Aziz Guliyev

== Competitions ==
=== Friendlies ===
8 July 2013	SC Hermagor (Austria)	1 – 4	(Azerbaijan) Baku	, Austria
AZST (UTC+5)	Goal	Summary	R.Aliyev 9'; Kalonas 38'; Horvat 60'; E.Aliyev 81'

11 July 2013	SV Penik (Austria)	0 – 8	(Azerbaijan) Baku	, Austria
AZST (UTC+5)		Summary	Horvat 1'; Abdullayev 5', 14'; Fomenko 31'; Mario Rubio 41'; R.Aliyev 56'; N.Alasgarov 69'; Kalonas 81'

13 July 2013	SPINS (Slovenia)	1 – 2	(Azerbaijan) Baku	, Austria
AZST (UTC+5)	Goal	Summary	Kalonas 26'; R.Aliyev 58'

16 July 2013	Donji Srem (Serbia)	4 – 1	(Azerbaijan) Baku	, Austria
AZST (UTC+5)	Goal	Summary	Ismayilov 73' (pen.)

21 July 2013	Udinese (Italy)	1 – 1	(Azerbaijan) Baku
20:15 AZST (UTC+5)	Zieliński 79'	Summary	Huseynov 33'

28 July 2013	Baku (Azerbaijan)	7 – 0	(Azerbaijan) Lokomotiv
AZST (UTC+5)	Šolić 24', 25', 45', 45+1'; Pena 39'; Česnauskis 58'; Kalonas 83'	Summary

12 January 2014	Baku (Azerbaijan)	4 – 0	(Albania) KF Laçi	Marbella, Spain
AZT (UTC+4)	Horvat 33'; Juninho 51'; Mario 56'; Šolić 70' (pen.)	Summary		Stadium: Benahavis Stadium

16 January 2014	Baku (Azerbaijan)	0 – 1	(Spain) Linense	Marbella, Spain
21:30 AZT (UTC+4)		[ Summary]		Stadium: Arroyo En Medio Stadium

19 January 2014	Baku (Azerbaijan)	0 – 0	(Ukraine) Dnipro Dnipropetrovsk	Marbella, Spain
AZT (UTC+4)		[ Summary]		Stadium: MFC Stadium

22 January 2014	Baku (Azerbaijan)	2 – 0	(Romania) Steaua București	Marbella, Spain
21:00 AZT (UTC+4)	Šolić 17'; N. Alasgarov 48'	[ Summary]		Stadium: Marbelyadakı Stadium

24 January 2014	Baku (Azerbaijan)	1 – 1	(Ukraine) Dynamo Kyiv	Marbella, Spain
AZT (UTC+4)	Huseynov 36' (pen.)	Summary	Ideye 89'	Stadium: Arroyo En Medio Stadium

=== Azerbaijan Premier League ===
==== Results summary ====
Overall								Home						Away					
Pld	W	D	L	GF	GA	GD	Pts	W	D	L	GF	GA	GD	W	D	L	GF	GA	GD
36	16	9	11	53	43	+10	57	10	5	3	33	17	+16	6	4	8	20	26	−6

Last updated: 19 May 2014.
Source: Soccerway

==== Results by round ====
Round	1	2	3	4	5	6	7	8	9	10	11	12	13	14	15	16	17	18	19	20	21	22	23	24	25	26	27	28	29	30	31	32	33	34	35	36
Ground	H	A	H	A	H	A	A	H	A	H	A	H	A	H	H	A	H	A	H	A	H	A	A	H	A	H	A	H	A	H	H	A	H	A	H	A
Result	L	L	W	W	W	L	D	W	L	D	D	W	L	W	L	W	W	L	W	W	W	W	D	D	L	D	W	W	L	D	L	D	D	L	W	W
Position	8	9	6	5	5	6	6	4	5	5	4	4	4	4	5	4	4	4	4	4	4	3	3	3	5	5	3	3	4	4	4	5	5	5	5	5

Source: Soccerway
A = Away; H = Home; W = Win; D = Draw; L = Loss

==== Results ====
2 August 2013 1	Baku	1 – 2	Gabala	Baku
18:30 AZST (UTC+5)	Kalonas 12'	Summary	Mendy 61', 81'	Stadium: Tofik Bakhramov Stadium; Attendance: 1,000; Referee: Fariz Yusifov

9 August 2013 2	AZAL	1 – 0	Baku	Baku
19:00 AZST (UTC+5)	Igbekoi 27'	Summary	Česnauskis (yellow card) 36' (yellow-red card) 45+1'	Stadium: AZAL Stadium; Attendance: 1,000; Referee: Rahim Häsänov

18 August 2013 3	Baku	5 – 0	Ravan Baku	Baku
18:00 AZST (UTC+5)	Travner 9'; Kalonas 11', 39'; Huseynov 79'; Šolić 82'	Summary		Stadium: Tofik Bakhramov Stadium Training Ground^{2} Attendance: 1,000; Referee: Vusal Äliyev

24 August 2013 4	Simurq	0 – 3	Baku	Zaqatala
19:00 AZST (UTC+5)		Summary	Huseynov 48', 90+2'; Ismayilov 60'	Stadium: Zaqatala City Stadium; Attendance: 1,000; Referee: Ramil Diniyev

31 August 2013 5	Baku	3 – 0	Neftchi Baku	Baku
18:00 AZST (UTC+5)	Aliyev 11'; Ismayilov 32'; Huseynov (red card) 48'; A.Mammadov (red card) 49'; Mario 68'	Summary		Stadium: Tofik Bakhramov Stadium Training Ground^{2} Attendance: 1,000; Referee: Rahim Häsänov

14 September 2013 6	Khazar Lankaran	2 – 1	Baku	Lankaran
19:00 AZST (UTC+5)	Mbilla 30', 47'	Summary	Kalonas 7'	Stadium: Lankaran City Stadium; Attendance: 7,100; Referee: Ramil Diniyev

21 September 2013 7	Inter Baku	2 – 2	Baku	Baku
17:00 AZST (UTC+5)	Iashvili 30'; Špičić 86'	Summary	Ismayilov 7', 45+1' (pen.)	Stadium: Shafa Stadium; Attendance: 600; Referee: Fariz Yusifov

28 September 2013 8	Baku	1 – 0	Sumgayit	Baku
16:00 AZST (UTC+5)	Kalonas 62'	Summary		Stadium: Tofik Bakhramov Stadium; Attendance: 500; Referee: Venera Kahric Muradova

4 October 2013 9	Qarabağ	3 – 0	Baku	Baku
20:00 AZST (UTC+5)	Agolli 37'; Nadirov 43'; Richard 45'	Summary		Stadium: Tofiq Bahramov Stadium^{1} Attendance: 1,000; Referee: Aliyar Ağayev

20 October 2013 10	Baku	2 – 2	AZAL	Baku
16:00 AZST (UTC+5)	Aliyev 11', 22'	Summary	Arsenijević 29'; Fomenko 70'	Stadium: Tofik Bakhramov Stadium; Attendance: 850; Referee: Rahim Häsänov

25 October 2013 11	Ravan Baku	0 – 0	Baku	Baku
18:00 AZST (UTC+5)		Summary		Stadium: Bayil Stadium; Attendance: 300; Referee: Fariz Yusifov

1 November 2013 12	Baku	3 – 2	Simurq	Baku
15:00 AZST (UTC+5)	Ismayilov 18' (pen.), 73' (pen.); Aliyev 78'	Summary	Osiako 42'; Gurbanov 83'	Stadium: Tofik Bakhramov Stadium; Attendance: 500; Referee: Ramil Diniyev

11 November 2013 13	Neftchi Baku	2 – 1	Baku	Baku
19:00 AZST (UTC+5)	Nfor 2'; Stamenković (red card) 27'; Imamverdiyev 45+2'	Summary	Ramos 53' (o.g.)	Stadium: Bakcell Arena; Attendance: 4,000; Referee: Fariz Yusifov

22 November 2013 14	Baku	3 – 0	Khazar Lankaran	Baku
14:00 AZST (UTC+5)	Huseynov 66'; Ristović 70'; Kalonas 83'	Summary		Stadium: Tofik Bakhramov Stadium; Attendance: 300; Referee: Aliyar Ağayev

30 November 2013 15	Baku	0 – 1	Inter Baku	Baku
14:00 AZT (UTC+4)		Summary	Javadov 59'	Stadium: Tofik Bakhramov Stadium; Attendance: 500; Referee: Orkhan Mämmädov

8 December 2013 16	Sumgayit	1 – 2	Baku	Sumqayit
17:00 AZT (UTC+4)	Mario 63' (o.g.); R.Gurbanov (red card) 90+2'	Summary	Mario 5'; Šolić 49' (pen.)	Stadium: Mehdi Huseynzade Stadium; Attendance: 500; Referee: Rauf Jabbarov

15 December 2013 17	Baku	2 – 1	Qarabağ	Baku
14:00 AZT (UTC+4)	Česnauskis 60'; Aliyev 73'	Summary	Kapolongo 76'	Stadium: Tofiq Bahramov Stadium; Attendance: 1,000; Referee: Rahim Häsänov

20 December 2013 18	Gabala	2 – 0	Baku	Qabala
13:00 AZST (UTC+5)	Guluzade (yellow card) 18'; Subotić 20' (yellow card) 47'; Allahverdiyev (yellow card) 42'; Pietrzkiewicz (yellow card) 83'; Ebecilio (yellow card) 85' (goal) 90+3'	Summary	Noguera (yellow card) 38'; S.Aliyev (yellow card) 54' (yellow-red card) 90+2'; Etto (yellow card) 63'; Rubén (yellow card) 76'	Stadium: Gabala City Stadium; Attendance: 1,500; Referee: Fariz Yusifov

2 February 2014 19	Baku	5 – 1	Ravan Baku	Baku
13:30 AZST (UTC+5)	Huseynov 12' (pen.); Ristović 23'; Juninho 46'; R.Äliyev 65'; Šolić 80'	Summary	Miracema 90+'	Stadium: Tofiq Bahramov Stadium; Attendance: 200; Referee: Omar Paşayev

9 February 2014 20	Simurq	0 – 1	Baku	Baku
15:00 AZT (UTC+4)		Summary	R.Aliyev 18'	Stadium: Shafa Stadium; Attendance: 1,500; Referee: Orkhan Mämmädov

15 February 2014 21	Baku	2 – 0	Neftchi Baku	Baku
13:30 AZT (UTC+4)	Huseynov 60'; Noguera 86'	Summary		Stadium: Tofiq Bahramov Stadium; Attendance: 1,000; Referee: Aliyar Ağayev

19 February 2014 22	Khazar Lankaran	0 – 2	Baku	Lankaran
17:00 AZT (UTC+4)		Summary	Travner 70'; R.Aliyev 90+1'	Stadium: Lankaran City Stadium; Attendance: 9,500; Referee: Orkhan Mämmädov

23 February 2014 23	Inter Baku	1 – 1	Baku	Baku
16:00 AZT (UTC+4)	Javadov 27'	Summary	Šolić 12'	Stadium: Shafa Stadium; Attendance: 500; Referee: Rahim Häsänov

28 February 2014 24	Baku	0 – 0	Sumgayit	Baku
14:00 AZT (UTC+4)		Summary	N.Mammadov (yellow card) 58' (yellow-red card) 60'	Stadium: Tofiq Bahramov Stadium; Attendance: 250; Referee: Orkhan Mämmädov

9 March 2014 25	Qarabağ	4 – 0	Baku	Baku
18:00 AZT (UTC+4)	Chumbinho 17'; Reynaldo 28', 43' (pen.); George 67'	Summary		Stadium: Tofiq Bahramov Stadium^{1} Attendance: 1,500; Referee: Rauf Jabbarov

16 March 2014 26	Baku	1 – 1	Gabala	Baku
14:00 AZT (UTC+4)	E.Mammadov 90+1'	Summary	Subotić 80'	Stadium: Tofiq Bahramov Stadium; Attendance: 600; Referee: Aliyar Ağayev

23 March 2014 27	AZAL	1 – 2	Baku	Baku
16:00 AZT (UTC+4)	John 39'	Summary	Travner 30'; Aílton Júnior 47' (o.g.)	Stadium: AZAL Arena; Attendance: 300; Referee: Ramil Häsänov

29 March 2014 28	Baku	2 – 1	Simurq	Baku
15:00 AZT (UTC+4)	N.Alasgarov 13'; Weitzman 22' (o.g.); Mustafayev (red card) 45+1'	Summary	Ćeran 81'	Stadium: Tofiq Bahramov Stadium; Attendance: 1,000; Referee: Omar Paşayev

6 April 2014 29	Neftchi Baku	1 – 0	Baku	Baku
15:30 AZST (UTC+5)	Nfor 80'	Summary		Stadium: Bakcell Arena; Attendance: 600; Referee: Aliyar Ağayev

12 April 2014 30	Baku	2 – 2	Khazar Lankaran	Baku
15:00 AZST (UTC+5)	Ismayilov 51' (pen.), 63' (pen.)	Summary	Nildo 2'; Elias 28'; Scarlatache (yellow card) 56' (yellow-red card) 62'	Stadium: Tofiq Bahramov Stadium; Attendance: 1,000; Referee: Ramil Diniyev

20 April 2014 31	Baku	0 – 4	Inter Baku	Baku
15:00 AZST (UTC+5)	Etto (yellow card) 72' (yellow-red card) 72'	Summary	D.Meza 11'; Etto 50' (o.g.); Álvaro 80'; Javadov 88'	Stadium: Tofiq Bahramov Stadium; Attendance: 1,000; Referee: Rahim Häsänov

27 April 2014 32	Sumgayit	1 – 1	Baku	Sumqayit
16:00 AZST (UTC+5)	Fardjad-Azad 47'	Summary	Ristović 69'	Stadium: Mehdi Huseynzade Stadium; Attendance: 1,500; Referee: Vusal Äliyev

2 May 2014 33	Baku	0 – 0	Qarabağ	Baku
15:00 AZST (UTC+5)		Summary		Stadium: Tofiq Bahramov Stadium; Attendance: 500; Referee: Ramil Diniyev

7 May 2014 34	Gabala	3 – 1	Baku	Qabala
17:00 AZST (UTC+5)	Izmailov 15'; M.Teymurov 27'; Subotić 57'	Summary	Alasgarov 65'	Stadium: Gabala City Stadium; Referee: Rahim Häsänov

12 May 2014 35	Baku	1 – 0	AZAL	Baku
18:00 AZST (UTC+5)	Šolić 71'	Summary		Stadium: Tofiq Bahramov Stadium; Attendance: 500; Referee: Omar Paşayev

17 May 2014 36	Ravan Baku	2 – 3	Baku	Baku
17:00 AZST (UTC+5)	Adamović 90'; Varea 90+4'	Summary	Aliyev 23'; Šolić 83'; T.Gurbatov 90+1'	Stadium: Bayil Stadium; Attendance: 200; Referee: Rahim Häsänov

==== League table ====
Pos	Team	Pld	W	D	L	GF	GA	GD	Pts	Qualification or relegation
3	Gabala	36	18	7	11	48	36	+12	61	Qualification for Europa League first qualifying round
4	Neftçi Baku	36	17	9	10	47	43	+4	60	Qualification for Europa League second qualifying round
5	Baku	36	16	9	11	53	43	+10	57	
6	Khazar Lankaran	36	12	13	11	44	49	−5	49	
7	Simurq	36	11	13	12	35	28	+7	46	

Source: Azerbaijan Professional Football league
Rules for classification: 1) points; 2) goal difference; 3) number of goals scored.

=== Azerbaijan Cup ===
4 December 2013 Second Round	Baku	2 – 1	Sumgayit	Baku
13:00 AZT (UTC+4)	Šolić 59' (pen.); Ristović 90+3'	Summary	S.Alkhasov 86'	Stadium: Tofik Bakhramov Stadium Training Ground; Attendance: 300; Referee: Vusal Äliyev

12 March 2014 Quarterfinals 1st leg	Ravan Baku	0 – 1	Baku	Baku
15:00 AZT (UTC+4)		Summary	Huseynov 29'	Stadium: Bayil Stadium; Attendance: 300; Referee: Orkhan Mämmädov

19 March 2014 Quarterfinals 2nd leg	Baku	0 – 1 (a.e.t.) (1 – 1 agg.) (8 – 9 p)	Ravan Baku	Baku
14:00 AZT (UTC+4)		Summary	E.Hasanliyev 85'	Stadium: Tofik Bakhramov Stadium; Attendance: 300; Referee: Elvin Äsgärov
	Penalties
	Penalty scored Penalty missed		Penalty scored

== Squad statistics ==
As of Match played 17 May 2014

=== Appearances and goals ===
No.	Pos	Nat	Player	Total		Premier League		Azerbaijan Cup	
No.	Pos	Nat	Player	Apps	Goals	Apps	Goals	Apps	Goals
1	GK	(Azerbaijan) AZE	Aqil Mammadov	21	0	19+0	0	2+0	0
2	DF	(Lithuania) LTU	Deividas Česnauskis	15	1	10+5	1	0+0	0
3	DF	(Slovenia) SLO	Jure Travner	38	2	35+0	2	3+0	0
4	DF	(Spain) ESP	Mario	33	2	29+1	2	3+0	0
5	DF	(Spain) ESP	Rubén	26	0	23+0	0	3+0	0
6	FW	(Azerbaijan) AZE	Vadim Abdullayev	17	0	15+2	0	0+0	0
7	MF	(Azerbaijan) AZE	Afran Ismayilov	17	6	15+2	6	0+0	0
8	MF	(Azerbaijan) AZE	Javid Huseynov	29	9	19+7	8	2+1	1
10	MF	(Croatia) CRO	Aleksandar Šolić	33	7	8+22	6	2+1	1
11	FW	(Azerbaijan) AZE	Rauf Aliyev	29	9	25+2	9	2+0	0
12	DF	(Brazil) BRA	Etto	30	0	27+0	0	3+0	0
15	MF	(Spain) ESP	Alberto Noguera	21	1	8+11	1	1+1	0
16	MF	(Brazil) BRA	Juninho	18	1	11+5	1	1+1	0
17	MF	(Serbia) SRB	Risto Ristović	25	4	19+4	3	1+1	1
19	FW	(Romania) ROU	Marius Pena	16	0	6+9	0	1+0	0
20	FW	(Azerbaijan) AZE	Tural Gurbatov	8	1	1+7	1	0+0	0
21	MF	(Azerbaijan) AZE	Elvin Mammadov	27	1	16+10	1	1+0	0
22	FW	(Azerbaijan) AZE	Namig Alasgarov	17	2	5+10	2	1+1	0
23	MF	(Slovenia) SLO	Lucas Horvat	37	0	34+0	0	2+1	0
24	DF	(Cyprus) CYP	Giorgos Pelagias	14	0	13+0	0	0+1	0
27	FW	(Azerbaijan) AZE	Nurlan Novruzov	3	0	2+1	0	0+0	0
28	GK	(Azerbaijan) AZE	Elkhan Ahmadov	8	0	7+0	0	1+0	0
30	MF	(Azerbaijan) AZE	Vugar Baybalayev	1	0	1+0	0	0+0	0
31	FW	(Azerbaijan) AZE	Vugar Mustafayev	19	0	16+0	0	3+0	0
34	DF	(Azerbaijan) AZE	Shahriyar Aliyev	10	0	6+3	0	0+1	0
Players who away from the club on loan:
20	MF	(Lithuania) LTU	Mindaugas Kalonas	18	6	14+3	6	1+0	0
Players who appeared for Baku no longer at the club:
5	DF	(Azerbaijan) AZE	Agil Nabiyev	2	0	2+0	0	0+0	0
27	MF	(Azerbaijan) AZE	Rahman Hajiyev	2	0	0+2	0	0+0	0
29	GK	(Azerbaijan) AZE	Kamran Agayev	10	0	10+0	0	0+0	0

=== Goal scorers ===
Place	Position	Nation	Number	Name	Premier League	Azerbaijan Cup	Total
1	FW	(Azerbaijan)	11	Rauf Aliyev	9	0	9
1	MF	(Azerbaijan)	8	Javid Huseynov	8	1	9
3	MF	(Croatia)	10	Aleksandar Šolić	6	1	7
4	MF	(Azerbaijan)	7	Afran Ismayilov	6	0	6
4	MF	(Lithuania)	20	Mindaugas Kalonas	6	0	6
6	MF	(Serbia)	17	Risto Ristović	3	1	4
7	MF	(Spain)	4	Mario	2	0	2
7	DF	(Slovenia)	3	Jure Travner	2	0	2
7	FW	(Azerbaijan)	22	Namig Alasgarov	2	0	2
10	DF	(Slovenia)	3	Jure Travner	1	0	1
10	DF	(Lithuania)	2	Deividas Česnauskis	1	0	1
10	MF	(Brazil)	16	Juninho	1	0	1
10	MF	(Spain)	15	Alberto Noguera	1	0	1
10	MF	(Azerbaijan)	21	Elvin Mammadov	1	0	1
10	FW	(Azerbaijan)	20	Tural Gurbatov	1	0	1
10				Own goal	3	0	3
				TOTALS	53	3	56

=== Disciplinary record ===
Number	Nation	Position	Name	Premier League		Azerbaijan Cup		Total	
Number	Nation	Position	Name	Yellow card	Red card	Yellow card	Red card	Yellow card	Red card
1	(Azerbaijan)	GK	Aqil Mammadov	1	1	0	0	1	1
2	(Lithuania)	MF	Deividas Česnauskis	4	1	0	0	4	1
3	(Slovenia)	DF	Jure Travner	6	0	0	0	6	0
4	(Spain)	DF	Mario	8	0	1	0	9	0
5	(Azerbaijan)	DF	Agil Nabiyev	1	0	0	0	1	0
5	(Spain)	DF	Rubén	7	0	0	0	7	0
6	(Azerbaijan)	FW	Vagif Abdullayev	1	0	0	0	1	0
7	(Azerbaijan)	MF	Afran Ismayilov	1	0	0	0	1	0
8	(Azerbaijan)	MF	Javid Huseynov	2	1	0	0	2	1
10	(Croatia)	MF	Aleksandar Šolić	2	0	0	0	2	0
11	(Azerbaijan)	FW	Rauf Aliyev	4	0	1	0	5	0
12	(Brazil)	MF	Etto	10	1	1	0	11	1
15	(Spain)	DF	Alberto Noguera	5	0	0	0	5	0
16	(Brazil)	MF	Juninho	3	0	1	0	4	0
17	(Serbia)	MF	Risto Ristović	4	0	1	0	5	0
19	(Romania)	FW	Marius Pena	1	0	0	0	1	0
20	(Lithuania)	MF	Mindaugas Kalonas	2	0	0	0	2	0
21	(Azerbaijan)	MF	Elvin Mammadov	2	0	0	0	2	0
22	(Azerbaijan)	FW	Namig Alasgarov	2	0	0	0	2	0
23	(Slovenia)	MF	Lucas Horvat	7	0	1	0	8	0
24	(Cyprus)	DF	Giorgos Pelagias	2	0	0	0	2	0
28	(Azerbaijan)	GK	Elkhan Ahmadov	1	0	0	0	1	0
29	(Azerbaijan)	GK	Kamran Agayev	3	0	0	0	3	0
31	(Azerbaijan)	FW	Vugar Mustafayev	4	1	0	0	4	1
34	(Azerbaijan)	DF	Shahriyar Aliyev	3	1	0	0	3	1
			TOTALS	86	6	6	0	92	6
