= 2014–15 FK Baku season =

Baku
2014-15 season
- President: Hafiz Mammadov
- Manager: Milinko Pantić until 24 July 2014; Ibrahim Uzundzha from 12 August 2014
- Stadium: Tofig Bakhramov Stadium
- Premier League: 9th
- Azerbaijan Cup: Quarterfinal vs Qarabağ
- Top goalscorer: League: Nurlan Novruzov (15); All: Nurlan Novruzov (15)
- Highest home attendance: 1,000 vs Qarabağ; 20 November 2014 vs Khazar Lankaran; 14 December 2014
- Lowest home attendance: 200 vs Simurq; 2 October 2014 vs Neftchi Baku; 29 October 2014 vs Inter Baku; 29 November 2014 vs Simurq; 18 March 2015 vs Inter Baku; 17 April 2015
- Average home league attendance: 465; 29 May 2015
Home colours	Away colours	Third colours

The Baku 2014-15 season is Baku's seventeenth Azerbaijan Premier League season. They will compete in the 2014–15 Azerbaijan Premier League and the 2014–15 Azerbaijan Cup. It is their second season with Milinko Pantić as their manager.

Milinko Pantić left the club by mutual consent on 24 July 2014, with Ibrahim Uzundzha being appointed as the club's new manager on 12 August 2014.

== Squad ==
As of 28 February 2014

Note: Flags indicate national team as defined under FIFA eligibility rules; some limited exceptions apply. Players may hold more than one non-FIFA nationality.

No.	Pos.	Nation	Player
1	GK	AZE	Elchin Sadigov (loan from Neftchi Baku)
2	DF	AZE	Nijat Asgarov
4	MF	AZE	Ulvi Suleymanov
5	DF	CYP	Giorgos Pelagias
6	DF	AZE	Vugar Baybalayev
7	MF	AZE	Nuran Gurbanov
9	FW	AZE	Raul Yagubzade
10	MF	AZE	Nurlan Novruzov
11	FW	AZE	Tural Gurbatov
12	GK	AZE	Elkhan Ahmadov
14	DF	AZE	Elvin Aliyev
15	DF	AZE	Azad Karimov
16	DF	AZE	Rüstäm Rüstämli

No.	Pos.	Nation	Player
17	FW	AZE	Elmin Asgarli
19	DF	AZE	Eltun Huseynov
20	FW	AZE	Valeh Seyidov
21	DF	AZE	Elshad Manafov
25	GK	AZE	Elmaddin Mammadov
28	FW	AZE	Ülvi Quliyev
45	FW	AZE	Mahir Madatov
54	MF	AZE	Martin Abilsoy
56	MF	AZE	Geyrat Aliyev
77	MF	AZE	Ramazan Abbasov
85	FW	BRA	Jabá
99	MF	AZE	Kamil Nurähmädov

== Transfers ==
=== Summer ===
In: Note: Flags indicate national team as defined under FIFA eligibility rules; some limited exceptions apply. Players may hold more than one non-FIFA nationality.

No.	Pos.	Nation	Player
7	MF	AZE	Nuran Gurbanov (from (Azerbaijan) Gabala)
30	MF	AZE	Jamshid Maharramov (loan return from (Azerbaijan) Ravan Baku)
85	FW	BRA	Jabá (from (Brazil) Juventus)
—	FW	AZE	Rahman Hajiyev (loan return from (Azerbaijan) Sumgayit)

Out: Note: Flags indicate national team as defined under FIFA eligibility rules; some limited exceptions apply. Players may hold more than one non-FIFA nationality.

No.	Pos.	Nation	Player
2	MF	LTU	Deividas Česnauskis (to (Lithuania) FK Trakai)
4	DF	ESP	Mario (to (Spain) Real Zaragoza)
5	DF	ESP	Rubén (to (Spain) Real Zaragoza)
6	FW	AZE	Vagif Abdullayev
7	MF	AZE	Afran Ismayilov (to (Azerbaijan) Khazar Lankaran)
8	FW	AZE	Javid Huseynov (to (Azerbaijan) Inter Baku)
10	MF	CRO	Aleksandar Šolić
11	FW	AZE	Rauf Aliyev (to (Azerbaijan) Khazar Lankaran)
12	DF	BRA	Etto
13	GK	MKD	Edin Nuredinoski
15	MF	ESP	Alberto Noguera (to (Spain) Trival Valderas)
16	MF	BRA	Juninho
18	MF	ESP	Mario Rubio (to (Spain) Tarazona)
19	FW	ROU	Marius Pena (to (Romania) Concordia Chiajna)
20	MF	LTU	Mindaugas Kalonas (to (Israel) Hapoel Haifa, previously on loan to (Azerbaijan) Simurq)
21	MF	AZE	Elvin Mammadov (to (Azerbaijan) Inter Baku)
22	FW	AZE	Namig Alasgarov (to (Azerbaijan) Qarabağ)
31	FW	AZE	Vugar Mustafayev (to (Azerbaijan) Simurq)
34	DF	AZE	Shahriyar Aliyev (to (Azerbaijan) Qarabağ)
—	FW	AZE	Rahman Hajiyev (loan to (Turkey) Gaziantep BB)
—	DF	AZE	Vadim Abdullayev (to (Azerbaijan) Simurq)
—	MF	AZE	David Alesgerov

=== Winter ===
In: Note: Flags indicate national team as defined under FIFA eligibility rules; some limited exceptions apply. Players may hold more than one non-FIFA nationality.

No.	Pos.	Nation	Player
1	GK	AZE	Elchin Sadigov (loan from (Azerbaijan) Neftchi Baku)
77	MF	AZE	Ramazan Abbasov (from (Azerbaijan) Sumgayit)
99	MF	AZE	Kamil Nurähmädov (from (Azerbaijan) Araz-Naxçıvan)
—	MF	AZE	Tagim Novruzov (Trial)
—	FW	AZE	Murad Hüseynov (Trial)

Out: Note: Flags indicate national team as defined under FIFA eligibility rules; some limited exceptions apply. Players may hold more than one non-FIFA nationality.

No.	Pos.	Nation	Player
1	GK	AZE	Agil Mammadov (to (Azerbaijan) Neftchi Baku)
3	DF	SLO	Jure Travner (to (England) Reading)
8	MF	SLO	Lucas Horvat (to (Slovenia) Domžale)
18	DF	AZE	Aziz Guliyev (to (Azerbaijan) Neftchi Baku)
22	MF	SRB	Risto Ristović (to (Greece) AEL)
30	MF	AZE	Jamshid Maharramov (to (Turkey) Adanaspor)
37	MF	AZE	Mikayil Rahimov (to (Azerbaijan) Sumgayit)
—	MF	AZE	Rahman Hajiyev (to (Azerbaijan) Neftchi Baku, previously on loan to (Turkey) Gaziantep BB)

== Friendlies ==
14 January 2015	Sumgayit	5 – 1	Baku	Sumqayit
AZST	Kurbanov; B.Nasirov; T.Mikayilov; O.Aliyev		N.Gurbanov

== Competitions ==
=== Azerbaijan Premier League ===
==== Results summary ====
Overall								Home						Away					
Pld	W	D	L	GF	GA	GD	Pts	W	D	L	GF	GA	GD	W	D	L	GF	GA	GD
32	3	8	21	19	68	−49	17	2	4	10	10	26	−16	1	4	11	9	42	−33

Last updated: 28 May 2015.
Source: Soccerway

==== Results ====
9 August 2014 1	Baku	Postponed	Simurq	Baku
18:00 AZST (UTC+5)		Summary		Stadium: Tofiq Bahramov Stadium; Referee: Orkhan Mämmädov

16 August 2014 2	Neftchi Baku	1 – 0	Baku	Baku
19:00 AZST (UTC+5)	Wobay 22'; E.Badalov (yellow card) 89'	Summary	Aliyev (yellow card) 15'; N.Gurbanov (yellow card) 77'; N.Novruzov (yellow card) 81'; Travner (yellow card) 90'	Stadium: Bakcell Arena; Attendance: 700; Referee: Omar Paşayev

22 August 2014 3	Baku	0 – 2	Gabala	Baku
18:00 AZST (UTC+5)	E.Huseynov (yellow card) 58'	Summary	Mendy 78'; Cristea (yellow card) 86'; Abışov 90'	Stadium: Tofik Bakhramov Stadium; Attendance: 500; Referee: Vusal Aliyev

31 August 2014 4	Qarabağ	2 – 2	Baku	Baku
20:30 AZST (UTC+5)	Chumbinho 32' (pen.); Teli (yellow card) 44'; Šehić (yellow card) 71'; Nadirov (yellow card) 73'; Muarem 84'; Reynaldo (yellow card) 89'	Summary	M.Rahimov (yellow card) 31'; N.Novruzov 66'; Travner 70'; Horvat (yellow card) 83'; Mammadov (yellow card) 90+2'	Stadium: Tofiq Bahramov Stadium^{1} Attendance: 1,000; Referee: Ramil Diniyev

14 September 2014 5	Baku	1 – 2	Sumgayit	Baku
17:00 AZST (UTC+5)	N.Novruzov 2' (yellow card) 43'; A.Guliyev (yellow card) 22'	Summary	B.Hasanalizade (yellow card) 36'; Kurbanov 56' (yellow card) 66'; Soltanpour 79'	Stadium: Tofik Bakhramov Stadium; Attendance: 300; Referee: Vusal Aliyev

19 September 2014 6	Inter Baku	7 – 0	Baku	Baku
19:00 AZST (UTC+5)	Nildo 10', 19'; D.Meza (yellow card) 27'; Dashdemirov 30' (yellow card) 66'; Tskhadadze 44', 48'; J.Diniyev 73'; Hajiyev 85'	Summary		Stadium: Inter Arena; Attendance: 300; Referee: Rauf Jabbarov

27 September 2014 7	Baku	Annulled^{2}	Araz-Naxçıvan	Baku
16:00 AZST (UTC+5)	T.Gurbatov 28'; E.Huseynov (yellow card) 47'; N.Gurbanov 77' (yellow card) 90'	Summary	E.Chobanov 50'; B.Nəsirov (yellow card) 71'; Huseynov (yellow card) 90+1'	Stadium: Tofik Bakhramov Stadium; Attendance: 500; Referee: Ingilab Mämmädov

2 October 2014 1	Baku	1 – 0	Simurq	Baku
16:00 AZST (UTC+5)	N.Novruzov 35' (yellow card) 76'; Pelagias (yellow card) 38'; V.Baybalayev (yellow card) 51'; Travner (yellow card) 88'	Summary	Qirtimov (yellow card) 15'; Weitzman (yellow card) 87'	Stadium: Tofiq Bahramov Stadium; Attendance: 200; Referee: Fariz Yusifov

19 October 2014 8	Khazar Lankaran	4 – 0	Baku	Lankaran
17:00 AZST (UTC+5)	Sankoh 35' (pen.) (yellow card) 41'; Ivanov 38'; E.Jafarov 43'; Aliyev 79' (pen.)	Summary	E.Manafov (yellow card) 26' (yellow-red card) 69'; Pelagias (yellow card) 34'; Ristović (yellow card) 36'; V.Baybalayev (yellow card) 78'; A.Mustafazadä (yellow card) 84'	Stadium: Lankaran City Stadium; Attendance: 5,000; Referee: Aliyar Ağayev

25 October 2014 9	AZAL	0 – 1	Baku	Baku
17:00 AZST (UTC+5)	Abdullayev (yellow card) 45'; N.Mammadov (yellow card) 87'; V.Igbekoi (yellow card) 90'	Summary	Maharramov (yellow card) 28'; A.Guliyev (yellow card) 35'; N.Novruzov 46'; V.Baybalayev (yellow card) 62' (yellow-red card) 77'	Stadium: AZAL Arena; Attendance: 400; Referee: Elvin Äsgärov

29 October 2014 10	Baku	1 – 3	Neftchi Baku	Baku
14:00 AZT (UTC+4)	N.Novruzov 55' (yellow card) 65'; A.Guliyev (yellow card) 67'; Jabá (yellow card) 70'	Summary	Wobay 38'; Ramos (yellow card) 60'; Abdullayev 62'; Cauê 85'	Stadium: Tofik Bakhramov Stadium; Attendance: 200; Referee: Ramil Diniyev

2 November 2014 11	Gabala	1 – 1	Baku	Qabala
15:30 AZT (UTC+4)	Dodô 5'; E.Jamalov (yellow card) 28'; Ropotan (yellow card) 41'; R.Tagizade (yellow card) 45+1'; Abışov (yellow card) 86'	Summary	Horvat (yellow card) 10'; E.Manafov (yellow card) 25' (yellow-red card) 90'; N.Gurbanov 45'; V.Baybalayev (yellow card) 50'; Jabá (yellow card) 90+3'	Stadium: Gabala City Stadium; Attendance: 1,000; Referee: Rahim Häsänov

20 November 2014 12	Baku	2 – 4	Qarabağ	Baku
14:00 AZT (UTC+4)	N.Gurbanov 10' (yellow card) 68'; Pelagias (yellow card) 21'; N.Novruzov (yellow card) 29'; Horvat (yellow card) 33'; Ristović 35' (yellow card) 71'; Jabá (yellow card) 71'	Summary	Emeghara 6', 15'; Garayev (yellow card) 50'; George (yellow card) 53' (goal) 78'; Reynaldo 70'	Stadium: Tofik Bakhramov Stadium; Attendance: 1,000; Referee: Orkhan Mämmädov

24 November 2014 13	Sumgayit	1 – 1	Baku	Sumqayit
17:00 AZT (UTC+4)	B.Hasanalizade (yellow card) 34'; Mammadov (yellow card) 44'; T.Jahangirov (yellow card) 84'; Soltanpour 85'	Summary	N.Novruzov 2'; Pelagias (yellow card) 32'; Horvat (yellow card) 44'; E.Huseynov (yellow card) 45'	Stadium: Kapital Bank Arena; Attendance: 500; Referee: Ramil Diniyev

29 November 2014 14	Baku	0 – 1	Inter Baku	Baku
14:00 AZT (UTC+4)	A.Guliyev (yellow card) 31'; Ristović (yellow card) 40'	Summary	Álvaro 39'; Lomaia (yellow card) 54'; Hajiyev (yellow card) 71'	Stadium: Tofik Bakhramov Stadium; Attendance: 200; Referee: Elvin Äsgärov

6 December 2014 15	Araz-Naxçıvan	– ^{2}	Baku	Nakhchivan
AZT (UTC+4)		[ Summary]		Stadium: Nakhchivan City Stadium

14 December 2014 16	Baku	0 – 0	Khazar Lankaran	Baku
14:00 AZT (UTC+4)	G.Aliyev (yellow card) 57'; Pelagias (yellow card) 63'; N.Gurbanov (yellow card) 76'; Madatov (yellow card) 85'	Summary	Sankoh (yellow card) 58'; Fernando Gabriel (yellow card) 84'	Stadium: Tofik Bakhramov Stadium; Attendance: 1,000; Referee: Vusal Aliyev

17 December 2014 17	Baku	1 – 3	AZAL	Baku
14:00 AZT (UTC+4)	Jabá (yellow card) 17'; E.Manafov (yellow card) 17'; N.Novruzov (yellow card) 26' (goal) 89'; V.Baybalayev (yellow card) 45+1'	Summary	Kostadinov 42', 45'; Kļava 61'; S.Asadov (yellow card) 64'; Juanfran (yellow card) 75'	Stadium: Tofik Bakhramov Stadium; Attendance: 500; Referee: Elvin Äsgärov

22 December 2014 18	Simurq	5 – 2	Baku	Zaqatala
12:00 AZT (UTC+4)	R.Eyyubov 16', 42' (yellow card) 38'; Ćeran 33' (pen.); Poljak (yellow card) 45'; Weitzman 45+1'; S.Zargarov 47'	Summary	N.Novruzov 14', 70' (pen.); G.Aliyev (yellow card) 17'; E.Huseynov (yellow card) 32'; A.Guliyev (yellow card) 45'	Stadium: Zaqatala City Stadium; Attendance: 700; Referee: Omar Paşayev

1 February 2015 19	Baku	2 – 0	Gabala	Baku
14:00 AZT (UTC+4)	Jabá (yellow card) 57'; N.Novruzov (yellow card) 84'	Summary	Huseynov 55' (pen.); V.Baybalayev 88' (o.g.)	Stadium: Tofik Bakhramov Stadium; Attendance: 500; Referee: Ingilab Mämmädov

7 February 2015 20	Qarabağ	4 – 1	Baku	Baku
16:00 AZT (UTC+4)	Medvedev 2'; A.Karimov 7' (o.g.); Richard 26' (pen.), 83'	Summary	N.Novruzov 22' (pen.); T.Gurbatov (yellow card) 38'	Stadium: Tofiq Bahramov Stadium^{1} Attendance: 450; Referee: Omar Paşayev

11 February 2015 21	Baku	0 – 0	Sumgayit	Baku
14:00 AZT (UTC+4)	G.Aliyev (yellow card) 57'	Summary	T.Jahangirov (yellow card) 66'	Stadium: Tofiq Bahramov Stadium; Attendance: 500; Referee: Aliyar Ağayev

15 February 2015 22	Inter Baku	4 – 0	Baku	Baku
17:00 AZT (UTC+4)	Tskhadadze 4' (pen.); Ismayilov 7', 39'; F.Bayramov (yellow card) 45+1'; Nildo 52'	Summary	T.Gurbatov (yellow card) 3'	Stadium: Inter Arena; Attendance: 1,000; Referee: Vusal Aliyev

18 February 2015 23	Araz-Naxçıvan	– ^{2}	Baku	Nakhchivan
AZT (UTC+4)		[ Summary]		Stadium: Nakhchivan City Stadium

28 February 2015 24	Khazar Lankaran	2 – 1	Baku	Lankaran
17:00 AZT (UTC+4)	A.Ramazanov 9', 79' (red card) 90+1'; I.Säfärzadä (yellow card) 44'	Summary	Pelagias (yellow card) 3' (yellow-red card) 90+3'; N.Gurbanov (yellow card) 26'; V.Baybalayev (yellow card) 37'; N.Novruzov 43'; G.Aliyev (yellow card) 59'	Stadium: Lankaran City Stadium; Attendance: 500; Referee: Omar Paşayev

8 March 2015 25	AZAL	2 – 0	Baku	Baku
16:00 AZT (UTC+4)	A.Gasimov 79'; L.Kasradze (yellow card) 81'; N.Gurbanov (yellow card) 83' (goal) 90+1'; Abdullayev (red card) 86'; K.Bayramov (yellow card) 90'	Summary	N.Asgarov (yellow card) 23'; Jabá (yellow card) 36' (yellow-red card) 69'	Stadium: AZAL Arena; Attendance: 200; Referee: Rahim Häsänov

18 March 2015 26	Baku	0 – 3	Simurq	Baku
15:00 AZT (UTC+4)	E.Huseynov (yellow card) 15'; G.Aliyev (yellow card) 30'; Abbasov (yellow card) 35'; E.Ahmadov (yellow card) 38'; V.Baybalayev (yellow card) 56'; N.Novruzov (yellow card) 81'	Summary	S.Zargarov 3', 74'; Ćeran 40'; Özkara (yellow card) 49'; E.Abdullayev (yellow card) 77'	Stadium: Tofiq Bahramov Stadium; Attendance: 200; Referee: Omar Paşayev

1 April 2015 27	Neftchi Baku	2 – 0	Baku	Baku
17:00 AZST (UTC+5)	A.Guliyev (yellow card) 6'; Canales (yellow card) 36' (goal) 42'; Wobay 65'	Summary	G.liyev (yellow card) 11'; K.Nurähmädov (yellow card) 71'	Stadium: Bakcell Arena; Attendance: 300; Referee: Xalil Xälilov

5 April 2015 28	Baku	1 – 1	Qarabağ	Baku
17:00 AZST (UTC+5)	N.Novruzov 40' (pen.); E.Ahmadov (yellow card) 84'	Summary	Reynaldo 25'; Šehić (yellow card) 87'; Agolli (yellow card) 87'	Stadium: Tofiq Bahramov Stadium; Attendance: 600; Referee: Fariz Yusifov

9 April 2015 29	Sumgayit	0 – 0	Baku	Sumqayit
17:00 AZST (UTC+5)	J.Hajiyev (yellow card) 65'; T.Jahangirov (yellow card) 70'; B.Nasirov (yellow card) 90'	Summary	N.Novruzov (yellow card) 33'; G.Aliyev (yellow card) 63'; Pelagias (yellow card) 77'; E.Huseynov (yellow card) 84'	Stadium: Kapital Bank Arena; Attendance: 1,000; Referee: Ramil Diniyev

17 April 2015 30	Baku	1 – 2	Inter Baku	Baku
16:00 AZST (UTC+5)	N.Novruzov (yellow card) 23' (goal) 90+3'; E.Huseynov (yellow card) 59'; N.Gurbanov (yellow card) 63'	Summary	C.Meza 9', 55'; Mammadov (yellow card) 71'	Stadium: Tofik Bakhramov Stadium; Attendance: 200; Referee: Vusal Aliyev

24 April 2015 31	Araz-Naxçıvan	– ^{2}	Baku	Nakhchivan
AZST (UTC+5)		[ Summary]		Stadium: Nakhchivan City Stadium

2 May 2015 32	Baku	2 – 1	Khazar Lankaran	Baku
17:00 AZST (UTC+5)	N.Novruzov 15' (pen.), 22'; N.Asgarov (yellow card) 46'; G.Aliyev (yellow card) 54' (yellow-red card) 60'; V.Baybalayev (yellow card) 89'	Summary	Sankoh (yellow card) 45+2'; S.Tounkara 55'; Scarlatache (yellow card) 89'	Stadium: Tofik Bakhramov Stadium; Attendance: 500; Referee: Omar Paşayev

9 May 2015 33	Baku	0 – 2	AZAL	Baku
17:00 AZST (UTC+5)	Pelagias (yellow card) 40'; V.Baybalayev (yellow card) 48' (yellow-red card) 73'; Jabá (yellow card) 58'; Madatov (red card) 90+2'	Summary	Abdullayev 45'; Mombongo-Dues (yellow card) 58' (goal) 75'	Stadium: Tofik Bakhramov Stadium; Attendance: 400; Referee: Rahim Häsänov

15 May 2015 34	Simurq	4 – 0	Baku	Zaqatala
17:00 AZST (UTC+5)	Melli (yellow card) 12'; Ćeran 28', 80'; Qirtimov (yellow card) 30'; Weitzman 37' (yellow card) 37'; R.Eyyubov 84'	Summary		Stadium: Zaqatala City Stadium; Attendance: 300; Referee: Vusal Aliyev

22 May 2015 35	Baku	0 – 0	Neftchi Baku	Baku
18:00 AZST (UTC+5)	Pelagias (yellow card) 63'	Summary	Nfor (yellow card) 25'; Stamenković (yellow card) 35'; E.Badalov (yellow card) 74'; Cauê (yellow card) 76'; Denis (yellow card) 87'	Stadium: Tofik Bakhramov Stadium; Attendance: 800; Referee: Rahim Häsänov

28 May 2015 36	Gabala	3 – 0	Baku	Qabala
20:00 AZST (UTC+5)	Mendy 7'; Ehiosun 13', 24'; Gai (yellow card) 33'; Q.Aliyev (yellow card) 73'; Santos (yellow card) 85'	Summary	E.Huseynov (yellow card) 23'; Məhəmmədov (yellow card) 60'; Q.Äliyev (yellow card) 89'	Stadium: Gabala City Stadium; Attendance: 2,200; Referee: Aliyar Ağayev

==== League table ====
Pos	Team	Pld	W	D	L	GF	GA	GD	Pts	Qualification
1	Qarabağ (C)	32	20	8	4	51	28	+23	68	Qualification for Champions League second qualifying round
2	Inter Baku	32	17	12	3	55	20	+35	63	Qualification for Europa League first qualifying round
3	Gabala	32	15	9	8	46	35	+11	54	Qualification for Europa League first qualifying round
4	Neftchi Baku	32	13	10	9	38	33	+5	49	Qualification for Europa League first qualifying round
5	Simurq	32	11	6	15	41	39	+2	39	
6	AZAL	32	10	9	13	37	42	−5	39	
7	Khazar Lankaran	32	8	8	16	35	46	−11	32	
8	Sumgayit	32	7	10	15	32	43	−11	31	
9	Baku	32	3	8	21	19	68	−49	17	Relegation to the Azerbaijan First Division
10	Araz-Naxçıvan (Note: Araz-Naxçıvan were officially withdrawn from the league on 17 November 2014)	0	0	0	0	0	0	0	0	Team withdrawn

Source: uefa.com
Rules for classification: 1) points; 2) head-to-head points; 3) head-to-head goal difference; 4) head-to-head goals scored; 5. head-to-head away goals (only if 2 teams are tied); 6) goal difference; 7) goals scored.
(C) Champions

=== Azerbaijan Cup ===
3 December 2014 Second Round	Sumgayit	0 – 0 (a.e.t.) (3 – 4 p)	Baku	Sumqayit
14:00 AZT (UTC+4)	O.Aliyev (yellow card) 43'; Mammadov (yellow card) 61'; J.Hajiyev (yellow card) 65' (yellow-red card) 83'; B.Näsirov (yellow card) 68'	Summary	A.Guliyev (yellow card) 27'; V.Baybalayev (yellow card) 57'; N.Gurbanov (yellow card) 62'; Horvat (yellow card) 82'	Stadium: Kapital Bank Arena; Attendance: 300; Referee: Rahim Häsänov
	Penalties
	(penalty scored); O.Aliyev (penalty missed); B.Nasirov (penalty scored); T.Mikayilov (penalty scored); Poladov (penalty missed); Hüseynov (penalty missed)		Horvat (penalty scored); N.Gurbanov (penalty missed); Madatov (penalty scored); V.Baybalayev (penalty scored); Jabá (penalty missed); Pelagias (penalty scored)

4 March 2015 Quarterfinals 1st leg	Qarabağ	3 – 0	Baku	Baku
17:00 AZT (UTC+4)	Reynaldo 6', 32'; Nadirov 24'; Teli (yellow card) 66'	Summary		Stadium: Tofiq Bahramov Stadium^{1} Attendance: 500; Referee: Vusal Aliyev

13 March 2015 Quarterfinals 2nd leg	Baku	1 – 4 (1 – 7 agg.)	Qarabağ	Baku
15:00 AZT (UTC+4)	Madatov 5' G.Aliyev (yellow card) 9'	Summary	Nadirov 12', 58', 69'; Garayev (yellow card) 27'; Taghiyev 56'	Stadium: Tofiq Bahramov Stadium; Attendance: 300; Referee: Xalili Xälilov

== Squad statistics ==
As of Match played 28 May 2015

=== Appearances and goals ===
No.	Pos	Nat	Player	Total		Premier League		Azerbaijan Cup	
No.	Pos	Nat	Player	Apps	Goals	Apps	Goals	Apps	Goals
1	GK	(Azerbaijan) AZE	Elchin Sadigov	2	0	1	0	1	0
2	DF	(Azerbaijan) AZE	Nijat Asgarov	14	0	13	0	1	0
4	MF	(Azerbaijan) AZE	Ulvi Suleymanov	11	0	1+8	0	1+1	0
5	DF	(Cyprus) CYP	Giorgos Pelagias	24	0	21	0	3	0
6	DF	(Azerbaijan) AZE	Vugar Baybalayev	31	0	29	0	2	0
7	MF	(Azerbaijan) AZE	Nuran Gurbanov	31	2	24+5	2	2	0
9	FW	(Azerbaijan) AZE	Raul Yagubzade	8	0	0+7	0	1	0
10	MF	(Azerbaijan) AZE	Nurlan Novruzov	32	14	31	14	1	0
11	FW	(Azerbaijan) AZE	Tural Gurbatov	33	1	26+5	1	1+1	0
12	GK	(Azerbaijan) AZE	Elkhan Ahmadov	18	0	17	0	1	0
14	DF	(Azerbaijan) AZE	Elvin Aliyev	1	0	1	0	0	0
15	DF	(Azerbaijan) AZE	Azad Karimov	12	0	5+7	0	0	0
16	DF	(Azerbaijan) AZE	Rüstäm Rüstämli	1	0	0+1	0	0	0
17	FW	(Azerbaijan) AZE	Elmin Asgarli	7	0	0+6	0	0+1	0
19	DF	(Azerbaijan) AZE	Eltun Huseynov	32	0	29	0	3	0
20	FW	(Azerbaijan) AZE	Valeh Seyidov	10	0	0+10	0	0	0
21	DF	(Azerbaijan) AZE	Elshad Manafov	25	0	17+6	0	1+1	0
26	GK	(Azerbaijan) AZE	Davud Äsgärov	1	0	1	0	0	0
28	FW	(Azerbaijan) AZE	Ülvi Quliyev	5	0	0+3	0	1+1	0
35	MF	(Azerbaijan) AZE	Qvanzav Məhəmmədov	1	0	0+1	0	0	0
39	MF	(Azerbaijan) AZE	Täyyar Mämmädov	1	0	0+1	0	0	0
45	FW	(Azerbaijan) AZE	Mahir Madatov	20	1	3+14	0	2+1	1
54	MF	(Azerbaijan) AZE	Martin Abilsoy	1	0	0	0	0+1	0
55	DF	(Azerbaijan) AZE	Aydin Mustafazadä	9	0	4+4	0	1	0
56	MF	(Azerbaijan) AZE	Geyrat Aliyev	20	0	17+1	0	2	0
77	MF	(Azerbaijan) AZE	Ramazan Abbasov	17	0	12+4	0	1	0
85	FW	(Brazil) BRA	Jabá	22	0	18+2	0	2	0
99	MF	(Azerbaijan) AZE	Kamil Nurähmädov	18	0	15+1	0	2	0
	DF	(Azerbaijan) AZE	Yusup Xakimov	1	0	0	0	0+1	0
Players who away from the club on loan:
Players who appeared for Baku no longer at the club:
1	GK	(Azerbaijan) AZE	Agil Mammadov	15	0	14	0	1	0
3	DF	(Slovenia) SLO	Jure Travner	7	1	7	1	0	0
8	MF	(Slovenia) SLO	Lucas Horvat	14	0	13	0	1	0
16	MF	(Azerbaijan) AZE	Rovshan Amiraslanov	1	0	0+1	0	0	0
18	DF	(Azerbaijan) AZE	Aziz Guliyev	17	0	14+2	0	1	0
22	MF	(Serbia) SRB	Risto Ristović	13	1	12+1	1	0	0
30	MF	(Azerbaijan) AZE	Jamshid Maharramov	14	0	12+1	0	1	0
37	DF	(Azerbaijan) AZE	Mikayil Rahimov	7	0	7	0	0	0

=== Goal scorers ===
Place	Position	Nation	Number	Name	Premier League	Azerbaijan Cup	Total
1	FW	(Azerbaijan)	10	Nurlan Novruzov	15	0	15
2	MF	(Azerbaijan)	7	Nuran Gurbanov	2	0	2
3	DF	(Slovenia)	3	Jure Travner	1	0	1
3	MF	(Serbia)	22	Risto Ristović	1	0	1
3	FW	(Azerbaijan)	45	Mahir Madatov	0	1	1
				TOTALS	19	1	20

=== Disciplinary record ===
Number	Nation	Position	Name	Premier League		Azerbaijan Cup		Total	
Number	Nation	Position	Name	Yellow card	Red card	Yellow card	Red card	Yellow card	Red card
1	(Azerbaijan)	GK	Agil Mammadov	1	0	0	0	1	0
2	(Azerbaijan)	DF	Nijat Asgarov	2	0	0	0	2	0
3	(Slovenia)	DF	Jure Travner	2	0	0	0	2	0
5	(Cyprus)	DF	Giorgos Pelagias	10	1	0	0	10	1
6	(Azerbaijan)	DF	Vugar Baybalayev	11	2	1	0	12	2
7	(Azerbaijan)	MF	Nuran Gurbanov	5	0	1	0	6	0
8	(Slovenia)	MF	Lucas Horvat	4	0	1	0	5	0
10	(Azerbaijan)	MF	Nurlan Novruzov	10	0	0	0	10	0
11	(Azerbaijan)	FW	Tural Gurbatov	2	0	0	0	2	0
12	(Azerbaijan)	GK	Elkhan Ahmadov	2	0	0	0	2	0
14	(Azerbaijan)	DF	Elvin Aliyev	1	0	0	0	1	0
18	(Azerbaijan)	DF	Aziz Guliyev	5	0	1	0	6	0
19	(Azerbaijan)	DF	Eltun Huseynov	7	0	0	0	7	0
21	(Azerbaijan)	DF	Elshad Manafov	5	2	0	0	5	2
22	(Serbia)	MF	Risto Ristović	3	0	0	0	3	0
30	(Azerbaijan)	MF	Jamshid Maharramov	1	0	0	0	1	0
35	(Azerbaijan)	MF	Qvanzav Məhəmmədov	1	0	0	0	1	0
37	(Azerbaijan)	DF	Mikayil Rahimov	1	0	0	0	1	0
45	(Azerbaijan)	FW	Mahir Madatov	1	1	0	0	1	1
55	(Azerbaijan)	DF	Aydin Mustafazadä	1	0	0	0	1	0
56	(Azerbaijan)	MF	Geyrat Aliyev	10	1	1	0	11	1
77	(Azerbaijan)	MF	Ramazan Abbasov	1	0	0	0	1	0
85	(Brazil)	FW	Jabá	8	1	0	0	8	1
99	(Azerbaijan)	MF	Kamil Nurähmädov	1	0	0	0	1	0
			TOTALS	95	8	5	0	100	8

== Notes ==
- Qarabağ have played their home games at the Tofiq Bahramov Stadium since 1993 due to the ongoing situation in Quzanlı.
- Araz-Naxçıvan were excluded from the Azerbaijan Premier League on 17 November 2014, with all their results being annulled.
