= 2012–13 FK Baku season =

Baku
2012–13 season
- President: (Azerbaijan) Hafiz Mammadov
- Manager: (Azerbaijan) Novruz Azimov until 19 July 2012 (Serbia) Božidar Bandović
- Stadium: Tofig Bakhramov Stadium
- Premier League: 5th
- Azerbaijan Cup: Semifinals vs Khazar Lankaran
- Europa League: 1st Qualifying Round vs (Slovenia) Mura 05
- Top goalscorer: League: Marius Pena (6); All: Marius Pena (7)
- Highest home attendance: 3,024^{1} vs (Slovenia) Mura 05 5 July 2012
- Lowest home attendance: 200 vs Sumgayit 28 November 2012
- Average home league attendance: 1,060
Home colours	Away colours	Third colours

The Baku 2012–13 season is Baku's fifteenth Azerbaijan Premier League season. This is Baku's first season under Božidar Bandović, who replaced Novruz Azimov after the UEFA Europa League qualifiers where they were beaten 2–0 on aggregate by Mura 05 of Slovenia. Baku will also participate in the 2012–13 Azerbaijan Cup.

== Squad ==
As of 25 April 2013

Note: Flags indicate national team as defined under FIFA eligibility rules; some limited exceptions apply. Players may hold more than one non-FIFA nationality.

No.	Pos.	Nation	Player
1	GK	AZE	Kamran Agayev
2	DF	BOL	Edemir Rodríguez
3	DF	LAT	Deniss Ivanovs
5	DF	AZE	Agil Nabiyev
7	MF	LTU	Deividas Česnauskis
8	MF	BRA	Juninho
10	MF	SLO	Lucas Horvat
11	MF	AZE	Elvin Mammadov (captain)
14	DF	AZE	Elvin Aliyev (vice-captain)
16	GK	AZE	Aqil Mammadov
17	MF	ESP	Mario Rubio
19	FW	AZE	Nurlan Novruzov
21	DF	AZE	Novruz Mammadov
22	MF	SRB	Risto Ristović

No.	Pos.	Nation	Player
23	FW	AZE	Rauf Aliyev
24	FW	ROU	Marius Pena
25	DF	AZE	Shahriyar Aliyev
27	DF	GEO	George Popkhadze
28	FW	TUR	Ferdi Elmas
29	DF	AZE	Aziz Guliyev
36	FW	CRC	Winston Parks
38	FW	AZE	Namig Alasgarov
77	MF	CRO	Aleksandar Šolić
82	GK	MKD	Edin Nuredinoski
93	GK	AZE	Elkhan Ahmadov
99	MF	AZE	Rahman Hajiyev
88	FW	AZE	Javid Huseynov

=== On Loan ===
Note: Flags indicate national team as defined under FIFA eligibility rules; some limited exceptions apply. Players may hold more than one non-FIFA nationality.

No.	Pos.	Nation	Player
20	DF	AZE	Elshad Manafov (at Turan Tovuz)

== Transfers ==
=== Summer ===
In: Note: Flags indicate national team as defined under FIFA eligibility rules; some limited exceptions apply. Players may hold more than one non-FIFA nationality.

No.	Pos.	Nation	Player
2	DF	BOL	Edemir Rodríguez (from (Bolivia) Club Bolívar)
17	MF	AZE	Ramazan Abbasov (from (Azerbaijan) Ravan Baku)
22	FW	GRE	Vangelis Mantzios (from (Greece) OFI)
26	MF	ARG	Leandro Becerra (from (Greece) PAS Giannina)
27	DF	GEO	George Popkhadze (from (Austria) Sturm Graz)
29	DF	AZE	Aziz Guliyev (from (Azerbaijan) Inter Baku)
82	GK	MKD	Edin Nuredinoski (from (Cyprus) Ethnikos Achna)

Out: Note: Flags indicate national team as defined under FIFA eligibility rules; some limited exceptions apply. Players may hold more than one non-FIFA nationality.

No.	Pos.	Nation	Player
1	GK	CRO	Marko Šarlija (to (Cyprus) Olympiakos Nicosia)
4	DF	MDA	Vadim Boret (Retired)
23	GK	SEN	Kalidou Cissokho (Retired)
98	FW	ESP	Koke (to (Germany) Jahn Regensburg)

=== Winter ===
In: Note: Flags indicate national team as defined under FIFA eligibility rules; some limited exceptions apply. Players may hold more than one non-FIFA nationality.

No.	Pos.	Nation	Player
1	GK	AZE	Kamran Agayev (from (Azerbaijan) Khazar Lankaran)
5	DF	AZE	Agil Nabiyev (from (Azerbaijan) AZAL)
17	MF	ESP	Mario Rubio (from (Cyprus) Olympiakos Nicosia)
22	MF	SRB	Risto Ristović (from (Serbia) Novi Pazar)
23	FW	AZE	Rauf Aliyev (from (Azerbaijan) Qarabağ)
24	FW	ROU	Marius Pena (from (Romania) Oțelul Galați)
28	FW	TUR	Ferdi Elmas (from (Turkey) Karşıyaka)
88	FW	AZE	Javid Huseynov (from (Turkey) Adana Demirspor)

Out: Note: Flags indicate national team as defined under FIFA eligibility rules; some limited exceptions apply. Players may hold more than one non-FIFA nationality.

No.	Pos.	Nation	Player
5	DF	CRO	Duje Baković (released)
15	MF	AZE	Jamshid Maharramov (to (Azerbaijan) Kəpəz)
17	MF	AZE	Ramazan Abbasov (to (Azerbaijan) Ravan Baku)
20	DF	AZE	Elshad Manafov (loan to (Azerbaijan) Turan Tovuz)
22	FW	GRE	Vangelis Mantzios (to (Greece) Atromitos)
23	FW	LAT	Māris Verpakovskis (to (Greece) Ergotelis)
24	MF	SRB	Nenad Kovačević (to (Romania) UTA Arad)
26	MF	ARG	Leandro Becerra
36	FW	CRC	Winston Parks (to (Costa Rica) Uruguay Coronado)
—	DF	AZE	Elshad Manafov (loan to (Azerbaijan) Turan Tovuz)
—	DF	AZE	Vugar Baybalayev (loan to (Azerbaijan) Turan Tovuz)
—	DF	AZE	Vasif Rzayev (loan to (Azerbaijan) Turan Tovuz)
—	FW	AZE	Ulvi Guliyev (loan to (Azerbaijan) Turan Tovuz)

== Competitions ==
=== Friendlies ===
12 October 2012	Baku	0–0	Ravan Baku	Baku
18:00 AZST (UTC+5)		Report

19 January 2013	Baku (Azerbaijan)	–	(Bulgaria) Veliko Tarnovo	Turkey
15:30 AZT (UTC+4)		[ Report]

=== Azerbaijan Premier League ===
==== Results summary ====
Overall								Home						Away					
Pld	W	D	L	GF	GA	GD	Pts	W	D	L	GF	GA	GD	W	D	L	GF	GA	GD
21	5	12	4	22	14	+8	27	3	6	1	11	6	+5	2	6	3	11	8	+3

Last updated: 4 March 2013.
Source: Soccerway

==== Results by round ====
Round	1	2	3	4	5	6	7	8	9	10	11	12	13	14	15	16	17	18	19	20	21	22
Ground	H	A	H	H	A	H	A	H	A	A	H	H	A	A	H	A	A	H	A	H	A	H
Result	D	D	W	D	L	D	D	D	L	D	W	L	W	D	D	D	L	D	W	W	D	W
Position		9	6	8	9	9	11	11	11	11	11	11	9	9	9	9	10	9	8	7	6	6

Source: Soccerway
A = Away; H = Home; W = Win; D = Draw; L = Loss

==== Results ====
4 August 2012 1	Neftchi Baku	Postponed^{1}	Baku	Baku
AZST (UTC+5)		Report		Stadium: Tofig Bahramov Stadium

10 August 2012 2	Baku	0–0	Simurq	Baku
19:00 AZST (UTC+5)		Summary		Stadium: Tofig Bakhramov Stadium; Attendance: 600; Referee: Rauf Jabbarov

18 August 2012 3	Ravan Baku	1–1	Baku	Baku
20:00 AZST (UTC+5)	Mikayilov 74'	Summary	Parks 88'	Stadium: Dalga Arena; Attendance: 200; Referee: Rahim Hasanov

26 August 2012 4	Baku	3–1	Kəpəz	Baku
20:00 AZST (UTC+5)	Novruzov 20'; Mantzios 49', 76'	Summary	Huseynli (yellow card) 12' (yellow-red card) 17'; Fomenko 55'	Stadium: Tofig Bakhramov Stadium; Attendance: 600; Referee: Elvin Askerov

14 September 2012 5	Baku	1–1	Turan Tovuz	Baku
20:00 AZST (UTC+5)	Kargbo 39'	Summary	Günlü 48'	Stadium: Tofig Bakhramov Stadium; Attendance: 480; Referee: Vusal Aliyev

23 September 2012 6	Khazar Lankaran	Postponed^{2}	Baku	Lankaran
AZST (UTC+5)		Report		Stadium: Lankaran City Stadium

30 September 2012 7	Sumgayit	1–0	Baku	Zaqatala
16:00 AZST (UTC+5)	Fardjad-Azad 38'	Summary		Stadium: Zaqatala City Stadium; Attendance: 5,500; Referee: Elvin Askerov

4 October 2012 8	Baku	1–1	Gabala	Baku
16:00 AZST (UTC+5)	Šolić 59'	Summary	Mendy 14'; Amiraslanov (yellow card) 40' (yellow-red card) 43'	Stadium: Tofig Bakhramov Stadium; Attendance: 500; Referee: Anar Salmanov

20 October 2012 9	Qarabağ	1–1	Baku	Quzanlı
16:00 AZST (UTC+5)	Richard 79' (pen.)	Summary	Rodríguez 23'	Stadium: Guzanli Olympic Complex Stadium; Attendance: 150; Referee: Aliyar Ağayev

26 October 2012 10	Baku	0–0	Inter Baku	Baku
16:00 AZST (UTC+5)		Summary		Stadium: Tofig Bakhramov Stadium; Attendance: 1,200; Referee: Vusal Aliyev

30 October 2012 11	AZAL	2–1	Baku	Baku
19:00 AZST (UTC+5)	Ibekoyi 39'; Nildo 76'	Summary	Horvat 10'	Stadium: AZAL Stadium; Attendance: 2,000; Referee: Rahim Hasanov

3 November 2012 12	Kəpəz	0–0	Baku	Ganja
14:00 AZT (UTC+4)		Summary		Stadium: Ganja City Stadium; Attendance: 4,000; Referee: Elchin Mämmädov

18 November 2012 13	Baku	2–0	Khazar Lankaran	Baku
14:00 AZT (UTC+4)	Juninho 6'; Rodríguez 55'	Summary		Stadium: Tofig Bakhramov Stadium; Attendance: 1,500; Referee: Fariz Yusifov

25 November 2012 14	Baku	1–2	Neftchi Baku	Baku
14:20 AZT (UTC+4)	E.Mammadov 60'; N.Mammadov (red card) 87'	Summary	Canales 62' (pen.); Flavinho 90+2'	Stadium: Tofig Bakhramov Stadium; Attendance: 2,000; Referee: Elchin Mämmädov

2 December 2012 15	Gabala	0–2	Baku	Qabala
14:00 AZT (UTC+4)		Summary	Juninho 53'; Novruzov 83'	Stadium: Gabala City Stadium; Attendance: 1,500; Referee: Anar Salmanov

6 December 2012 6^{2}	Khazar Lankaran	1–1	Baku	Lankaran
16:00 AZT (UTC+4)	Amirguliyev 83'	Summary	Šolić 77'	Stadium: Lankaran City Stadium; Attendance: 6,500; Referee: Vusal Aliyev

10 December 2012 16	Baku	Postponed^{3}	Turan	Baku
14:00 AZT (UTC+4)		Summary		Stadium: Tofig Bakhramov Stadium

15 December 2012 17	Baku	0–0	Qarabağ	Baku
14:00 AZT (UTC+4)		Summary	Garayev (red card) 90+1'	Stadium: Tofig Bakhramov Stadium; Attendance: 1,000; Referee: Anar Salmanov

18 December 2012 1	Neftchi Baku	1–1	Baku	Baku
14:00 AZT (UTC+4)	Sadigov 10' (pen.)	Summary	Guliyev 86'	Stadium: Tofig Bahramov Stadium; Attendance: 1,000; Referee: Rahim Häsänov

22 December 2012 18	Inter Baku	1–0	Baku	Baku
15:00 AZT (UTC+4)	Tskhadadze 58' (pen.)	Summary		Stadium: Shafa Stadium; Attendance: 350; Referee: Rauf Jabbarov

10 February 2013 19	Baku	1–1	Sumgayit	Baku
13:30 AZT (UTC+4)	Pena 29'; Nabiyev (yellow card) 58' (yellow-red card) 59'	Summary	Aliyev 12'	Stadium: Tofig Bakhramov Stadium; Attendance: 1,500; Referee: Elchin Mämmädov

13 February 2013 16	Turan Tovuz	0–4	Baku	Baku
15:00 AZT (UTC+4)		Summary	Pena 43'; Mammadov 62'; Šolić 68'; Novruzov 85'	Stadium: Tofig Bakhramov Stadium; Attendance: 150; Referee: Elvin Äsgärov

16 February 2013 20	Baku	2–0	AZAL	Baku
14:00 AZT (UTC+4)	Nabiyev 42'; Horvat 80'	Summary		Stadium: Tofig Bakhramov Stadium; Attendance: 700; Referee: Vusal Aliyev

22 February 2013 21	Simurq	0–0	Baku	Zaqatala
17:00 AZT (UTC+4)		Summary		Stadium: Zaqatala City Stadium; Attendance: 2,500; Referee: Anar Salmanov

3 March 2013 22	Baku	2–1	Ravan Baku	Baku
15:00 AZT (UTC+4)	Pena 19', 57'	Summary	Rahimov 12'	Stadium: Tofig Bakhramov Stadium; Attendance: 1,000; Referee: Fariz Yusifov

==== League table ====
Pos	Team	Pld	W	D	L	GF	GA	GD	Pts	Qualification
4	Simurq	22	9	9	4	25	15	+10	36	Qualification for championship group
5	Gabala	22	9	5	8	26	27	−1	32	Qualification for championship group
6	Baku	22	6	12	4	24	15	+9	30	Qualification for championship group
7	AZAL	22	7	8	7	32	25	+7	29	Qualification for relegation group
8	Khazar Lankaran	22	7	7	8	32	27	+5	28	Qualification for relegation group

Source: Association of Football Federations of Azerbaijan and Soccerway.com
Rules for classification: 1) points; 2) goal difference; 3) number of goals scored.

=== Azerbaijan Premier League Championship Group ===
==== Results summary ====
Overall								Home						Away					
Pld	W	D	L	GF	GA	GD	Pts	W	D	L	GF	GA	GD	W	D	L	GF	GA	GD
10	3	2	5	9	8	+1	11	1	1	3	4	2	+2	2	1	2	5	6	−1

Last updated: 20 May 2013.
Source: Soccerway

==== Results by round ====
Round	1	2	3	4	5	6	7	8	9	10
Ground	H	A	H	A	H	H	A	H	A	A
Result	D	W	L	D	L	W	L	L	L	W
Position	6	5	5	5	5	5	5	5	5	5

Updated to match(es) played on 20 May 2013. Source: Soccerway
A = Away; H = Home; W = Win; D = Draw; L = Loss

==== Results ====
12 March 2013 23	Baku	1–1	Neftchi Baku	Baku
15:00 AZT (UTC+4)	Abdullayev 43'	Summary	Pena 83'	Stadium: Tofig Bakhramov Stadium; Attendance: 1,500; Referee: Fariz Yusifov

30 March 2013 24	Simurq	0–1	Baku	Zaqatala
17:00 AZT (UTC+4)		Summary	Pena 77'	Stadium: Zaqatala City Stadium; Attendance: 1,500; Referee: Elchin Mämmädov

6 April 2013 25	Baku	1–2	Inter Baku	Baku
15:00 AZST (UTC+5)	Nabiyev 90+3'	Summary	Mammadov 68'; Fomenko 81'	Stadium: Tofig Bakhramov Stadium; Attendance: 1,000; Referee: Fariz Yusifov

13 April 2013 26	Gabala	1–1	Baku	Qabala
15:00 AZST (UTC+5)	Mendy 30'	Summary	Aliyev 90+1' (pen.)	Stadium: Gabala City Stadium; Attendance: 750; Referee: Anar Salmanov

21 April 2013 27	Baku	0–1	Qarabağ	Baku
16:00 AZST (UTC+5)		Summary	Richard 87' (pen.)	Stadium: Tofig Bakhramov Stadium; Attendance: 1,000; Referee: Ramil Diniyev

28 April 2013 28	Baku	2–1	Simurq	Baku
16:00 AZST (UTC+5)	Huseynov 9'; Aliyev 79'	Summary	Burkhardt 81'	Stadium: Tofig Bakhramov Stadium; Attendance: 800; Referee: Rahim Häsänov

4 May 2013 29	Inter Baku	2–1	Baku	Baku
21:00 AZST (UTC+5)	Tskhadadze 35'; Rocha 41'	Summary	Huseynov 50'	Stadium: Shafa Stadium; Attendance: 650; Referee: Rauf Jabbarov

9 May 2013 30	Baku	0–1	Gabala	Baku
17:00 AZST (UTC+5)		Summary	Assis 65'	Stadium: Tofig Bakhramov Stadium; Attendance: 1,000; Referee: Rahim Häsänov

14 May 2013 31	Qarabağ	3–1	Baku	Baku^{1}
17:30 AZST (UTC+5)	Muarem 37'; Nadirov 58'; Ivanovs 73' (o.g.)	Summary	Mario 18'; R.Aliyev (red card) 84'	Stadium: Tofiq Bahramov Stadium; Attendance: 800; Referee: Vusal Aliyev

19 May 2013 32	Neftchi Baku	0–1	Baku	Baku
20:30 AZST (UTC+5)	Denis (red card) 60'	Summary	Horvat 75'	Stadium: Bakcell Arena; Referee: Rauf Jabbarov

==== Table ====
Pos	Team	Pld	W	D	L	GF	GA	GD	Pts	Qualification
2	Qarabağ	32	16	11	5	43	26	+17	59	Qualification for Europa League first qualifying round
3	Inter Baku	32	16	9	7	38	22	+16	57	Qualification for Europa League first qualifying round
4	Simurq	32	12	12	8	32	26	+6	48	
5	Baku	32	9	14	9	33	27	+6	41	
6	Gabala	32	10	8	14	32	40	−8	38	

Source: Soccerway.com
Rules for classification: 1) points; 2) goal difference; 3) number of goals scored.

=== Azerbaijan Cup ===
28 November 2012 Second Round	Baku	3–1	Sumgayit	Baku
13:15 AZT (UTC+4)	Verpakovskis 8', 11'; T.Gurbatov 39'	Summary	Hüseynov 75' (pen.)	Stadium: Tofig Bakhramov Stadium; Attendance: 200; Referee: Rauf Jabbarov

27 February 2013 Quarterfinals 1st Leg	Baku	1–1	Inter Baku	Baku
15:00 AZT (UTC+4)	Nabiyev 90+2'	Summary	Kandelaki 80'	Stadium: Tofig Bakhramov Stadium; Attendance: 1,000; Referee: Rahim Häsänov

7 March 2013 Quarterfinals 2nd Leg	Inter Baku	2–2 (3–3 (a) agg.)	Baku	Baku
16:00 AZT (UTC+4)	Tskhadadze 42', 60'	Summary	Šolić 32'; Aliyev 68'	Stadium: Shafa Stadium; Attendance: 1,500; Referee: Anar Salmanov

17 April 2013 Semifinals 1st Leg	Baku	1–0	Khazar Lankaran	Baku
16:00 AZST (UTC+5)	Pena 84' (pen.)	Summary		Stadium: Tofig Bakhramov Stadium; Attendance: 1,600; Referee: Vusal Aliyev

24 April 2013 Semifinals 2nd Leg	Khazar Lankaran	2–0 (2–1 agg.)	Baku	Lankaran
19:00 AZST (UTC+5)	Ramazanov 45+1'; Amirguliyev 82'	Summary		Stadium: Lankaran City Stadium; Attendance: 10,000; Referee: Elchin Mämmädov

=== UEFA Europa League ===
==== First qualifying round ====
5 July 2012 1st Leg	Baku (Azerbaijan)	0–0	(Slovenia) Mura 05	Baku^{4}
21:00 AZST (UTC+5)		Report		Stadium: Dalga Arena; Attendance: 3,024; Referee: Sergiy Dankovskyy (Ukraine)

12 July 2012 2nd Leg	Mura 05 (Slovenia)	2–0 (2–0 agg.)	(Azerbaijan) Baku	Lendava
23:00 AZST (UTC+5)	Eterović 26'; Fajić 83'	Report		Stadium: Športni park Attendance: 2,000; Referee: Athanassios Giachos (Greece)

Notes

- Note 1: Baku's game against Neftchi Baku was postponed due to Neftchi's involvement in the 2012–13 UEFA Champions League
- Note 2: Baku's game against Khazar Lankaran was postponed due to a clash with FIFA U-17 Women's World Cup qualifier.
- Note 3: Baku's game away to Turan Tovuz on 10 December was postponed due to a fire at the Tofig Bakhramov Stadium.
- Note 4: Baku played their home match at Dalga Arena, Baku instead of their regular stadium, Tofiq Bahramov Stadium, Baku.

== Squad statistics ==
As of 20 May 2013

=== Appearances and goals ===
No.	Pos	Nat	Player	Total		Premier League		Azerbaijan Cup		Europa League	
No.	Pos	Nat	Player	Apps	Goals	Apps	Goals	Apps	Goals	Apps	Goals
1	GK	(Azerbaijan) AZE	Kamran Agayev	8	0	7+0	0	1+0	0	0+0	0
2	DF	(Bolivia) BOL	Edemir Rodríguez	22	2	16+1	2	3+0	0	2+0	0
3	DF	(Latvia) LAT	Deniss Ivanovs	22	0	12+6	0	1+1	0	2+0	0
5	DF	(Azerbaijan) AZE	Agil Nabiyev	11	3	8+0	2	2+1	1	0+0	0
6	MF	(Sierra Leone) SLE	Ibrahim Kargbo	27	1	18+5	1	2+0	0	2+0	0
7	MF	(Lithuania) LTU	Deividas Česnauskis	23	0	13+4	0	3+1	0	2+0	0
8	MF	(Brazil) BRA	Juninho	29	2	21+4	2	1+1	0	2+0	0
10	MF	(Slovenia) SLO	Lucas Horvat	31	3	21+4	3	5+0	0	1+0	0
11	MF	(Azerbaijan) AZE	Elvin Mammadov	35	2	21+7	2	4+1	0	1+1	0
14	DF	(Azerbaijan) AZE	Elvin Aliyev	9	0	5+2	0	2+0	0	0+0	0
16	GK	(Azerbaijan) AZE	Aqil Mammadov	4	0	1+1	0	0+0	0	2+0	0
17	MF	(Spain) ESP	Mario	6	1	3+2	1	1+0	0	0+0	0
18	FW	(Azerbaijan) AZE	Tural Gurbatov	4	1	1+2	0	1+0	1	0+0	0
19	FW	(Azerbaijan) AZE	Nurlan Novruzov	15	3	7+8	3	0+0	0	0+0	0
20	DF	(Azerbaijan) AZE	Elshad Manafov	1	0	0+0	0	0+1	0	0+0	0
21	DF	(Azerbaijan) AZE	Novruz Mammadov	5	0	2+2	0	0+0	0	0+1	0
22	MF	(Serbia) SRB	Risto Ristović	13	0	5+4	0	3+1	0	0+0	0
23	FW	(Azerbaijan) AZE	Rauf Aliyev	13	2	8+3	2	1+1	0	0+0	0
24	FW	(Romania) ROU	Marius Pena	19	7	12+3	6	3+1	1	0+0	0
25	DF	(Azerbaijan) AZE	Shahriyar Aliyev	35	1	30+0	0	5+0	1	0+0	0
27	DF	(Georgia (country)) GEO	George Popkhadze	24	0	17+3	0	3+0	0	1+0	0
28	FW	(Turkey) TUR	Ferdi Elmas	10	0	3+4	0	2+1	0	0+0	0
29	DF	(Azerbaijan) AZE	Aziz Guliyev	20	1	15+3	1	2+0	0	0+0	0
38	FW	(Azerbaijan) AZE	Namig Alasgarov	3	0	3+0	0	0+0	0	0+0	0
77	MF	(Croatia) CRO	Aleksandar Šolić	36	4	19+10	3	3+2	1	1+1	0
82	GK	(North Macedonia) MKD	Edin Nuredinoski	29	0	25+0	0	4+0	0	0+0	0
88	FW	(Azerbaijan) AZE	Javid Huseynov	14	2	8+3	2	3+0	0	0+0	0
98	FW	(Azerbaijan) AZE	Vadim Abdullayev	1	0	0+1	0	0+0	0	0+0	0
99	MF	(Azerbaijan) AZE	Rahman Hajiyev	14	0	11+1	0	0+0	0	1+1	0
Players who appeared for Baku no longer at the club:
5	DF	(Croatia) CRO	Duje Baković	1	0	0+0	0	0+1	0	0+0	0
15	MF	(Azerbaijan) AZE	Jamshid Maharramov	9	0	8+0	0	0+0	0	1+0	0
17	MF	(Azerbaijan) AZE	Ramazan Abbasov	7	0	6+0	0	1+0	0	0+0	0
22	FW	(Greece) GRE	Vangelis Mantzios	8	2	7+1	2	0+0	0	0+0	0
23	FW	(Latvia) LAT	Māris Verpakovskis	11	2	4+4	0	1+0	2	1+1	0
24	MF	(Serbia) SRB	Nenad Kovačević	13	0	11+0	0	0+0	0	2+0	0
26	MF	(Argentina) ARG	Leandro Becerra	4	0	2+2	0	0+0	0	0+0	0
36	FW	(Costa Rica) CRC	Winston Parks	7	1	1+4	1	0+0	0	1+1	0

=== Goal scorers ===
Place	Position	Nation	Number	Name	Premier League	Azerbaijan Cup	Europa League	Total
1	FW	(Romania)	24	Marius Pena	6	1	0	7
2	MF	(Croatia)	77	Aleksandar Šolić	3	1	0	4
3	FW	(Azerbaijan)	19	Nurlan Novruzov	3	0	0	3
3	MF	(Slovenia)	10	Lucas Horvat	3	0	0	3
3	DF	(Azerbaijan)	5	Agil Nabiyev	2	1	0	3
6	FW	(Greece)	22	Vangelis Mantzios	2	0	0	2
6	DF	(Bolivia)	2	Edemir Rodríguez	2	0	0	2
6	MF	(Brazil)	8	Juninho	2	0	0	2
6	FW	(Latvia)	23	Māris Verpakovskis	0	2	0	2
6	MF	(Azerbaijan)	11	Elvin Mammadov	2	0	0	2
6	FW	(Azerbaijan)	23	Rauf Aliyev	2	0	0	2
6	FW	(Azerbaijan)	88	Javid Huseynov	2	0	0	2
13	FW	(Costa Rica)	36	Winston Parks	1	0	0	1
13	MF	(Sierra Leone)	6	Ibrahim Kargbo	1	0	0	1
13	DF	(Azerbaijan)	29	Aziz Guliyev	1	0	0	1
13	FW	(Azerbaijan)	19	Nurlan Novruzov	1	0	0	1
13	MF	(Spain)	17	Mario	1	0	0	1
13	FW	(Azerbaijan)	18	Tural Gurbatov	0	1	0	1
13	DF	(Azerbaijan)	25	Shahriyar Aliyev	0	1	0	1
				TOTALS	33	6	0	39

=== Disciplinary record ===
Number	Nation	Position	Name	Premier League		Azerbaijan Cup		Europa League		Total	
Number	Nation	Position	Name	Yellow card	Red card	Yellow card	Red card	Yellow card	Red card	Yellow card	Red card
1	(Azerbaijan)	GK	Kamran Agayev	2	0	0	0	0	0	2	0
2	(Bolivia)	DF	Edemir Rodríguez	4	0	0	0	0	0	4	0
3	(Latvia)	DF	Deniss Ivanovs	1	0	0	0	2	0	3	0
5	(Azerbaijan)	DF	Agil Nabiyev	4	1	1	0	0	0	5	1
6	(Sierra Leone)	MF	Ibrahim Kargbo	4	0	0	0	0	0	4	0
7	(Lithuania)	MF	Deividas Česnauskis	3	0	0	0	1	0	4	0
8	(Brazil)	MF	Juninho	3	0	0	0	0	0	3	0
10	(Slovenia)	MF	Lucas Horvat	6	0	0	0	0	0	6	0
11	(Azerbaijan)	MF	Elvin Mammadov	2	0	0	0	0	0	2	0
14	(Azerbaijan)	DF	Elvin Aliyev	2	0	0	0	0	0	2	0
15	(Azerbaijan)	MF	Jamshid Maharramov	0	0	0	0	1	0	1	0
16	(Azerbaijan)	GK	Aqil Mammadov	0	0	0	0	1	0	1	0
17	(Azerbaijan)	MF	Ramazan Abbasov	1	0	0	0	0	0	1	0
17	(Spain)	MF	Mario	1	0	0	0	0	0	1	0
19	(Azerbaijan)	FW	Nurlan Novruzov	3	0	0	0	0	0	3	0
20	(Azerbaijan)	DF	Elshad Manafov	0	0	1	0	0	0	1	0
21	(Azerbaijan)	DF	Novruz Mammadov	1	1	0	0	0	0	1	1
22	(Serbia)	MF	Risto Ristović	3	0	0	0	0	0	3	0
22	(Greece)	FW	Vangelis Mantzios	3	0	0	0	0	0	3	0
23	(Latvia)	FW	Māris Verpakovskis	2	0	0	0	0	0	2	0
23	(Azerbaijan)	FW	Rauf Aliyev	2	1	0	0	0	0	2	1
24	(Romania)	FW	Marius Pena	2	0	1	0	0	0	3	0
24	(Serbia)	MF	Nenad Kovačević	3	0	0	0	1	0	4	0
25	(Azerbaijan)	DF	Shahriyar Aliyev	8	0	1	0	0	0	9	0
27	(Georgia (country))	DF	George Popkhadze	3	0	0	0	0	0	3	0
29	(Azerbaijan)	DF	Aziz Guliyev	4	0	0	0	0	0	4	0
77	(Croatia)	MF	Aleksandar Šolić	4	0	0	0	0	0	4	0
82	(North Macedonia)	GK	Edin Nuredinoski	3	0	1	0	0	0	4	0
88	(Azerbaijan)	FW	Javid Huseynov	2	0	0	0	0	0	2	0
			TOTALS	76	3	5	0	4	0	85	3
