= Lucas (footballer, born 1984) =

Brazilian footballer (born 1984)

Personal information
- Full name: Jefferson Lucas Azevedo dos Santos
- Date of birth: 25 October 1984 (age 42)
- Place of birth: Londrina, Brazil
- Position: Midfielder

Youth career
- Londrina

Senior career*
Years	Team	Apps	(Gls)
2004	Londrina	0	(0)
2004–2008	Junior Team Futebol	0	(0)
2005	→ Domžale (loan)	2	(0)
2005–2006	→ Amarante (loan)		
2006–2007	→ J. Malucelli (loan)	0	(0)
2007	→ Portuguesa Londrinense (loan)	0	(0)
2008	→ União São João (loan)	0	(0)
2008	→ Uniclinic (loan)	0	(0)
2008	→ Atlético Cambé (loan)	0	(0)
2009	Universitatea Craiova	0	(0)
- * Club domestic league appearances and goals

Jefferson Lucas Azevedo dos Santos known as Lucas (born 25 October 1984) is a Brazilian footballer.

== Biography ==
Born in Londrina, Paraná, Lucas played a match in 2004 Copa do Brasil for Londrina Esporte Clube, then transferred to Londrina Junior Team on 1 April 2004, an affiliated club of Londrina (later split and no connection).

In January 2005 he was loaned to Slovenian side Domžale, rejoining Jhonnes and Juninho. In September, he extended his contract with Londrina Junior Team until March 2009. He then left for Portuguese side Amarante of League of Porto district (fifth level in the pyramid).

He returned to Brazil and loaned to J. Malucelli in October 2006. He played 3 times for the club at 2006 Copa Paraná (on matchday 7 [sub], 8, and 9.)

He also played for the club at 2007 Campeonato Paranaense.

In July 2007, he was loaned to Portuguesa Londrinense. He played for the club at 2007 Copa Paraná.

In January 2008, he was loaned to União São João. He played the first 2 games of 2008 Campeonato Paulista Série A2 without a goal. In February, he left for Uniclinic of 2008 Campeonato Cearense. The team only collected four points in 18 games, finished as the last. He played seven out of nine games in the second half of the season, and played round 14 and 15 as unused bench.

In July, he left for Atlético Cambé. He played a few games in 2008 Campeonato Paranaense Third Division. The team finished as the last with two points.

In February 2009, he left for Romanian side Universitatea Craiova.

== Career statistics ==
Club performance			League		Cup		Total	
Season	Club	League	Apps	Goals	Apps	Goals	Apps	Goals
Brazil			League		Copa do Brasil		Total	
2004	Londrina	Série B	0	0	1	0	?	?^{1}
Slovenia			League		Slovenian Cup		Total	
2004–05	Domžale	1. SNL	2	0	?	?	?	?
Portugal			League		Taça de Portugal		Total	
2005–06	Amarante	Porto Regional	?	?	?	?	?	?
Brazil			League		Copa do Brasil		Total	
2006	J. Malucelli	Paraná Regional					3	0^{2}
2007	J. Malucelli	Paraná Regional					8+	2^{3}
2007	Portuguesa Londrinense	Paraná Regional					13	2^{4}
2008	União São João	São Paulo Regional Lv.2					2	0^{5}
2008	Uniclinic	Ceará Regional					7	0^{6}
2008	Atlético Cambé	Paraná Regional Lv.3					5+	1^{7}
Romania			League		Cupa României		Total	
2008–09	Universitatea Craiova	Liga I	0	0	?	?	?	?
Total	Brazil		0	0	1	0	?	?
Total	Slovenia		2	0	?	?	?	?
Total	Portugal		?	?	?	?	?	?
Total	Romania		0	0	?	?	?	?
Career total			?	?	?	?	?	?

^{1} Unknown match in 2004 Campeonato Paranaense
^{2} 3 matches in 2006 Copa Paraná
^{3} 8+ matches and 2 goals in 2007 Campeonato Paranaense; line-up not known in round 6 and 14
^{4} 13 matches and 2 goals in 2007 Copa Paraná
^{5} 2 matches in 2008 Campeonato Paulista Série A2
^{6} 7 matches in 2008 Campeonato Cearense
^{7} 5+ games and 1 goal in 2008 Campeonato Paranaense Third Division; line-up not available for round 2
