= Rafael Kneif =

Brazilian footballer

Rafael Knief
Personal information
- Full name: Rafael Reis Kneif
- Date of birth: 25 April 1992 (age 34)
- Place of birth: Sorocaba, Brazil
- Height: 1.74 m (5 ft 9 in)
- Position: Defender

Youth career
- Corinthians
- Flamengo
- 2011: Coritiba

Senior career*
Years	Team	Apps	(Gls)
2012–2013	Junior Team		
2013	Carrarese		
2015	Ceahlăul Piatra Neamț	14	(0)
- * Club domestic league appearances and goals

Rafael Reis Kneif (born 24 April 1992) is a Brazilian former footballer who played as a defender.

He also holds Portuguese citizenship.

== Career ==
On 23 February 2015, Kneif made his professional debut with Ceahlăul Piatra Neamț in a 2014–15 Liga I match against CFR Cluj.
