= Jhonnes =

Brazilian footballer

Marques de Souza
Personal information
- Full name: Jhonnes Marques de Souza
- Date of birth: 22 April 1984 (age 42)
- Place of birth: Londrina, Brazil
- Height: 1.93 m (6 ft 4 in)
- Position: Centre back

Team information
- Current team: Zlaté Moravce
- Number: 5

Youth career
- 2000–2003: PSTC
- 2004: Londrina Junior Team
- 2004: → Udinese (loan)

Senior career*
| Years | Team | Apps | (Gls) |
| 2004–2010 | Junior Team Futebol | 0 | (0) |
| 2004–2006 | → Domžale (loan) | 47 | (8) |
| 2006–2007 | → Celje (loan) | 11 | (0) |
| 2008 | → Náutico (loan) | 0 | (0) |
| 2008 | → Treze (loan) | 0 | (0) |
| 2009 | → Londrina (loan) | 0 | (0) |
| 2009 | → Arapongas (loan) | 0 | (0) |
| 2009–2010 | → Hrvatski Dragovoljac (loan) | 15 | (2) |
| 2010 | Liepājas Metalurgs | 8 | (2) |
| 2011 | Újpest | 1 | (0) |
| 2011 | Varaždin | 8 | (0) |
| 2012–2013 | Tobol | 36 | (3) |
| 2015–2016 | ViOn Zlaté Moravce | 29 | (9) |
- * Club domestic league appearances and goals as of 21 June 2016

Jhonnes Marques de Souza (born 22 April 1984) is a Brazilian football defender who last played for ViOn Zlaté Moravce in the Fortuna Liga.

== Biography ==
Born in Londrina, Paraná, Jhonnes was signed by Londrina Junior Team in 2004, the youth team of Londrina (later became two separate entity). He also trailed at Serie A team Udinese but failed to sign a contract, as Italian clubs were restricted to sign any non-EU player.

=== Slovenia ===
In September 2004 he left for Slovenian side Domžale along with Juninho. In February 2005, his contract with Londrina Junior Team was extended to 31 December 2008 and Lucas also joined him at Domžale. He played 20 league matches in 2005–06 season. In 2006–07 season he left for Celje. In January 2007, his contract with Londrina Junior Team was extended again, to 31 December 2011.

=== Returned to Brazil ===
In January 2008. he joined Náutico. and in February left for Treze. He also trailed at German side TuS Koblenz in January 2009, played a friendly.

In February 2009, he was signed by Londrina. In April, he was signed by Arapongas.

=== Return to Europe ===
He was loaned to Croatian side Hrvatski dragovoljac in August 2009.

In August 2010, he finally terminated his contract with Junior Team Futebol (ex-Londrina Junior Team) and left for Latvia side Liepājas Metalurgs, played 8 times and scored 2 goals in Latvian Higher League.

In February 2011, he signed a contract with Újpest FC. and in September 2011 he signed for NK Varaždin.
