= Risto Ristović =

Serbian footballer

Personal information
- Date of birth: 5 May 1988 (age 38)
- Place of birth: Valjevo, Serbia, SFR Yugoslavia
- Height: 1.74 m (5 ft 9 in)
- Position: Midfielder

Senior career*
Years	Team	Apps	(Gls)
2005–2006	Mačva Šabac	8	(0)
2007–2008	OFK Beograd	0	(0)
2007–2008	→ Vujić Valjevo (loan)	26	(3)
2008–2012	Banat Zrenjanin	70	(9)
2012	Novi Pazar	14	(1)
2013–2014	Baku	45	(4)
2015	Larissa	7	(0)
2015	Voždovac	16	(0)
2016	Okzhetpes	25	(3)
2017	Zemun	13	(3)
2017	Budućnost Podgorica	3	(0)
2018–2019	Radnik Surdulica	49	(2)
2020	Kolubara	7	(0)
2021–2022	Budućnost Krušik 2014		
Total		283	(25)
- * Club domestic league appearances and goals as of 9 November 2023

Risto Ristović (Serbian Cyrillic: Ристо Ристовић; born 5 May 1988) is a Serbian retired footballer who played as a midfielder.

== Career ==
Born in Valjevo, Ristović began his career playing for Mačva. He moved to OFK Beograd during the 2006–07 season. In the 2007–08 season he was on loaned to FK Vujić Valjevo. In 2008, Ristović moved to FK Banat Zrenjanin. In 2012, he moved to FK Novi Pazar playing in the Serbian Superliga.

In May 2015, Ristović solved his contract with Larissa in the Greek Football League.

In January 2017, Ristović went on trial with Tajik champions Istiklol.

On 21 June 2017, Ristović signed a one-year contract with Montenegrin champions Budućnost Podgorica.

== Career statistics ==
As of 13 October 2017

Appearances and goals by club, season and competition
Club	Season	League			National Cup		Continental		Total	
Club	Season	Division	Apps	Goals	Apps	Goals	Apps	Goals	Apps	Goals
Novi Pazar	2012–13	Serbian SuperLiga	14	1	2	0	—		16	1
Baku	2012–13	Azerbaijan Premier League	9	0	4	0	0	0	13	0
Baku	2013–14	Azerbaijan Premier League	23	3	2	1	—		25	4
Baku	2014–15	Azerbaijan Premier League	13	1	0	0	—		13	1
Baku	Total		45	4	6	1	0	0	51	5
Larissa	2014–15	Beta Ethniki	7	0	0	0	—		7	0
Voždovac	2015–16	Serbian SuperLiga	16	0	2	0	—		18	0
Okzhetpes	2016	Kazakhstan Premier League	25	3	2	0	—		27	3
Zemun	2016–17	Serbian First League	13	3	0	0	—		13	3
Budućnost Podgorica	2017–18	Montenegrin First League	3	0	0	0	1	0	4	0
Career total			123	11	12	1	1	0	136	12
