= Giorgi Popkhadze =

Georgian footballer (born 1986)

Personal information
- Date of birth: 25 September 1986 (age 40)
- Place of birth: Tbilisi, Soviet Union
- Height: 1.82 m (6 ft 0 in)
- Position: Left-back

Youth career
- Dinamo Tbilisi
- Häcken

Senior career*
Years	Team	Apps	(Gls)
2003–2006	Tbilisi	26	(2)
2006	→ Olympiacos (loan)	0	(0)
2006–2010	Viborg FF	74	(0)
2011	Zestaponi	6	(0)
2011–2012	Sturm Graz	20	(0)
2012–2013	FC Baku	19	(0)
2013–2014	Jagiellonia Białystok	26	(0)
2013	Jagiellonia Białystok II	4	(0)
2014	Sioni Bolnisi	6	(1)
2015	Jagiellonia Białystok	6	(0)
2015	Jagiellonia Białystok II	2	(0)
2015	Flamurtari Vlore	10	(0)
2016–2017	Locomotive Tbilisi	21	(1)
2017	Dila Gori	16	(1)
2018	Kyzylzhar	28	(0)

International career
2006–2008	Georgia U21	15	(0)
2006–2015	Georgia	11	(0)
- * Club domestic league appearances and goals

Giorgi Popkhadze (Georgian: გიორგი ფოფხაძე; born 25 September 1986) is a Georgian former professional footballer who played as a left-back.

== Club career ==
In the summer of 2012, Popkhadze signed for Azerbaijan Premier League side FK Baku. After making 24 appearances in all competitions, Popkhadze was released at the end of the 2012–13 season.

== International career ==
Popkhadze made his debut for Georgia on 1 March 2006, in a 2–0 friendly win against Malta.

== Career statistics ==
As of 17 June 2014

Appearances and goals by club, season and competition
Club	Season	League			National cup		Continental		Total	
Club	Season	Division	Apps	Goals	Apps	Goals	Apps	Goals	Apps	Goals
Tbilisi	2004–05	Umaglesi Liga	14	0			—		14	0
Tbilisi	2005–06	Umaglesi Liga	12	2			—		12	2
Tbilisi	Total		26	2			—		26	2
Olympiacos (loan)	2005–06	Alpha Ethniki	0	0	0	0	—		0	0
Viborg FF	2006–07	Danish Superliga	11	0			—		11	0
Viborg FF	2007–08	Danish Superliga	14	0			—		14	0
Viborg FF	2008–09	Danish 1st Division	16	0	1	0	—		17	0
Viborg FF	2009–10	Danish 1st Division	21	0	3	1	—		24	1
Viborg FF	2010–11	Danish 1st Division	12	0	1	0	—		13	0
Viborg FF	Total		74	0	5	1	—		79	1
Zestaponi	2010–11	Umaglesi Liga	6	0	1	0	—		7	0
Sturm Graz	2011–12	Austrian Bundesliga	20	0	3	0	9	0	32	0
FK Baku	2012–13	Azerbaijan Premier League	19	0	3	0	1	0	23	0
Jagiellonia Białystok	2013–14	Ekstraklasa	26	0	5	0	0	0	31	0
Career total			171	2	16	1	10	0	197	3

=== International ===
As of 1 January 2012.

Georgia national team
Year	Apps	Goals
2006	2	0
2007	0	0
2008	0	0
2009	5	0
2010	0	0
2011	0	0
Total	7	0

== Honors ==
Zestaponi

- Umaglesi Liga: 2010–11
