= Alberto Noguera =

Spanish footballer

Personal information
- Full name: Alberto Noguera Ripoll
- Date of birth: 24 September 1989 (age 37)
- Place of birth: Madrid, Spain
- Height: 1.73 m (5 ft 8 in)
- Position: Attacking midfielder

Youth career
- Getafe
- S.S. Reyes

Senior career*
Years	Team	Apps	(Gls)
2007–2008	Rayo Vallecano B	22	(0)
2008	Rayo Majadahonda	5	(0)
2008–2009	S.S. Reyes	23	(1)
2009–2010	Atlético Madrid C	35	(2)
2010–2012	Atlético Madrid B	60	(4)
2011–2012	Atlético Madrid	2	(0)
2012–2013	Blackpool	1	(0)
2013–2014	Baku	19	(1)
2014–2015	Trival Valderas	29	(2)
2015–2016	Fuenlabrada	25	(2)
2016–2018	Lorca	67	(3)
2018–2020	Numancia	28	(1)
2019	→ Racing Santander (loan)	19	(3)
2020–2022	Goa	39	(4)
2022–2024	Mumbai City	33	(5)
2024–2025	Bengaluru	26	(5)
2025	Rayo Majadahonda	6	(0)
2026	Chennaiyin	12	(0)
- * Club domestic league appearances and goals as of 12:03, 15 June 2026 (UTC)

Alberto Noguera Ripoll (born 24 September 1989) is a Spanish professional footballer who plays as an attacking midfielder.

== Club career ==
=== Atlético Madrid ===
Noguera was born in Madrid. After playing his first years as a senior with two clubs in the Community of Madrid, both in the Tercera División, he signed with Atlético Madrid in July 2009, initially being assigned to the C team also in that level.

Following an impressive first season, Noguera was promoted to Atlético Madrid B in the Segunda División B for the 2010–11 campaign. In the beginning of 2011, he was picked by manager Quique Sánchez Flores to train with the main squad and on 24 April he made his La Liga debut, coming on as a substitute for Elias for the last five minutes of a 4–1 home win against Levante UD.

=== Blackpool ===
On 14 August 2012, Noguera signed a two-year contract with Football League Championship side Blackpool, with an option for a third year. He made his debut on the 25th, playing the second half in a 6–0 victory over Ipswich Town at Bloomfield Road.

Noguera's contract with the Seasiders was terminated on 29 July 2013, by mutual consent. He left the club with only one official appearance to his credit.

=== Baku ===
At the end of August 2013, Noguera agreed to a one-year deal at FC Baku of the Azerbaijan Premier League. He scored his first professional goal on 15 February of the following year, closing a 2–0 home defeat of Neftçi PFK.

=== Back to Spain ===
Following the expiration of his contract, Noguera returned to his homeland, joining CF Trival Valderas in the third tier. On 18 July 2015, he signed with CF Fuenlabrada of the same league.

Roughly one year later, Noguera moved to fellow third-division team Lorca FC. He achieved promotion to Segunda División in 2017, contributing three goals. He scored his first as a professional in his country on 11 March 2018, but in a 3–1 away loss against Real Zaragoza. The side would also be immediately relegated, after a 21st-place finish.

Noguera signed a two-year contract with CD Numancia on 26 June 2018. On 26 December, he was loaned to third-tier Racing de Santander until the following 30 June.

=== Goa ===
On 3 September 2020, Noguera joined Indian Super League's FC Goa on a two-year deal. He appeared with the club in the 2021 Durand Cup, playing in the semi-finals against Bengaluru FC (7–6 sudden death win) and the final against Mohammedan SC (1–0) as it won its first-ever trophy in the competition.

=== Mumbai City ===
Noguera continued in the Indian top division in the 2022–23 season, with the 32-year-old agreeing to a contract at Mumbai City FC. He made his first appearance on 18 August, winning the penalty for his team's second goal in an eventual 4–1 victory over Indian Navy Sports Club in the Durand Cup.

Noguera and the Islanders were crowned champions in 2023–24. In the final against Mohun Bagan Super Giant, won 3–1 at the Salt Lake Stadium, he was involved in Jorge Pereyra Díaz's 53rd-minute equaliser.

=== Bengaluru ===
On 7 July 2024, Noguera joined Bengaluru. He made his debut 24 days later, assisting twice in the 4–0 win over Indian Navy in the Durand Cup group stage. He scored his first goal the next match, helping the hosts to defeat Inter Kashi FC 3–0 in the same competition. Throughout the league campaign, he netted five times and provided four decisive passes; in addition, he completed 41 dribbles.

Noguera was named Bengaluru Players' Player of the Year in April 2025. On 30 May, he left the club upon the expiry of his contract.

=== Later career ===
On 16 July 2025, aged 35, Noguera returned to CF Rayo Majadahonda after 17 years away, with the team now in the Segunda Federación. He moved back to the Indian top tier the following January, on a short-term deal at Chennaiyin FC.

== Career statistics ==
As of 5 November 2025

Club	Season	League			Cup		Continental		Other		Total	
Club	Season	Division	Apps	Goals	Apps	Goals	Apps	Goals	Apps	Goals	Apps	Goals
Atlético Madrid	2010–11	La Liga	2	0	0	0	—		—		2	0
Atlético Madrid B	2010–11	Segunda División B	23	2	0	0	—		—		23	2
Atlético Madrid B	2011–12	Segunda División B	37	2	0	0	—		—		37	2
Atlético Madrid B	Total		60	4	0	0	0	0	0	0	60	4
Blackpool	2012–13	Championship	1	0	0	0	—		—		1	0
Baku	2013–14	Azerbaijan Premier League	19	1	2 (Note: Appearances in Azerbaijan Cup)	0	—		—		21	1
Trival Valderas	2014–15	Segunda División B	29	2	1 (Note: Appearance in Copa del Rey)	0	—		—		30	2
Fuenlabrada	2015–16	Segunda División B	25	2	0	0	—		—		25	2
Lorca	2016–17	Segunda División B	33	2	1	0	—		4 (Note: Appearances in Segunda División B play-offs)	1	38	3
Lorca	2017–18	Segunda División	34	1	1	0	—		—		35	1
Lorca	Total		67	3	2	0	0	0	4	1	73	4
Numancia	2018–19	Segunda División	5	0	1	0	—		—		6	0
Numancia	2019–20	Segunda División	23	1	0	0	—		—		23	1
Numancia	Total		28	1	1	0	0	0	0	0	29	1
Racing Santander (loan)	2018–19	Segunda División B	19	3	0	0	—		3	0	22	3
Goa	2020–21	Indian Super League	20	1	0	0	—		—		20	1
Goa	2021–22	Indian Super League	19	3	0	0	—		6 (Note: Appearances in Durand Cup)	1	25	4
Goa	Total		39	4	0	0	0	0	6	1	45	5
Mumbai City	2022–23	Indian Super League	20	4	0	0	—		8 (Note: Seven appearances in Durand Cup, one appearance in Indian club qualifiers)	1	28	5
Mumbai City	2023–24	Indian Super League	13	1	3 (Note: Appearances in Super Cup)	0	—		4	1	20	2
Mumbai City	Total		33	5	3	0	0	0	12	2	48	7
Bengaluru	2024–25	Indian Super League	26	5	1	0	—		5	1	32	6
Rayo Majadahonda	2025–26	Segunda Federación	6	0	1	0	—		0	0	7	0
Career total			354	30	11	0	0	0	30	5	395	35

== Honours ==
Goa

- Durand Cup: 2021

Mumbai City

- Indian Super League: 2022–23
- Indian Super League Cup: 2023–24
- Durand Cup runner-up: 2022

Bengaluru

- Indian Super League Cup runner-up: 2024–25
