= Leandro (footballer, born December 1987) =

Brazilian footballer

Leandro Rocha dos Santos, commonly known as Leandro (born 13 December 1987 in São Paulo city, São Paulo) is a Brazilian football player at the position of striker.

He scored once for Clube Atletico Juventus during the 2010 Copa Paulista.

He previously played for Palmeiras B.
