= Juninho (footballer, born 1984) =

Brazilian footballer

Personal information
- Full name: Wilson Aparecido Xavier Júnior
- Date of birth: 15 March 1984 (age 42)
- Place of birth: Arapongas, Brazil
- Height: 1.80 m (5 ft 11 in)
- Position: Midfielder

Team information
- Current team: Ihan

Youth career
- 1999–2001: Londrina
- 2001: Fluminense
- 2001–2004: Londrina
- 2004: → Chievo (loan)

Senior career*
Years	Team	Apps	(Gls)
2004	Londrina	0	(0)
2004–2010	Junior Team Futebol	0	(0)
2004–2008	→ Domžale (loan)	103	(10)
2009	→ Figueirense (loan)	0	(0)
2009–2010	→ Domžale (loan)	22	(3)
2010–2011	Domžale	31	(7)
2011–2014	Baku	66	(6)
2015–2017	Domžale	41	(6)
2017–2018	DSG Sele/Zell	10	(3)
2018–	Ihan	19	(9)
- * Club domestic league appearances and goals as of 1 July 2019

Wilson Aparecido Xavier Júnior (born 15 March 1984), commonly known as Juninho, is a Brazilian footballer who plays as a midfielder for Ihan.

== Career ==
Born in Arapongas, Paraná, Juninho started his career at Londrina Junior Team, the youth team of Londrina (they later became two separate entities). He played once in the national cup in 2004. He was then loaned to Serie A team Chievo but played for its youth team. As Italy prevented signing non-EU players, he only trialled with the club and never signed for them officially.

=== Domžale ===
In 2004 he was loaned to Domžale from Londrina Junior Team along with Jhonnes. Later, teammate Lucas also joined him. Juninho remained at the city of Domžale for 4 1/2 seasons. His contract with Londrina Junior Team was also renewed in January 2007, as he signed a new five-year contract. He left the club on 2 December 2008.

=== Figueirense ===
On 23 December 2008, Figueirense announced the signing of the player on a one-year contract. His contract with Figueirense was terminated on 19 May 2009, after he played a few games in Campeonato Catarinense. He did not play any match in the 2009 Campeonato Brasileiro Série B.

=== Return to Domžale ===
On 31 August 2009 he returned to Slovenia in a 1 1/2-year deal. The deal with Domžale was renewed on 1 December 2010, until 31 May 2013.

=== Baku ===
At the beginning of the 2011–12 season, after already playing one match with Domžale in the league, Juninho signed with FC Baku.

=== Second return to Domžale ===
In February 2015, Juninho returned to Domžale, signing a contract till the end of the 2016–17 season.

== Personal life ==
Juninho is the cousin of fellow footballer Ademar.

== Career statistics ==
Appearances and goals by club, season and competition
Club	Season	League			National cup		Supercup		Continental		Total	
Club	Season	Division	Apps	Goals	Apps	Goals	Apps	Goals	Apps	Goals	Apps	Goals
Domžale (loan)	2004–05	Slovenian PrvaLiga	10	2	1	0	—		—		11	2
Domžale (loan)	2005–06	Slovenian PrvaLiga	35	2	2	0	—		4	0	41	2
Domžale (loan)	2006–07	Slovenian PrvaLiga	31	4	0	0	—		4	1	35	5
Domžale (loan)	2007–08	Slovenian PrvaLiga	14	0	2	0	1	0	2	0	19	0
Domžale (loan)	2008–09	Slovenian PrvaLiga	13	2	1	0	1	0	3	0	18	2
Domžale (loan)	2009–10	Slovenian PrvaLiga	22	3	5	0	—		—		27	3
Domžale	2010–11	Slovenian PrvaLiga	30	7	5	3	—		—		35	10
Domžale	2011–12	Slovenian PrvaLiga	1	0	0	0	1	1	2	0	4	1
Baku	2011–12	Azerbaijan Premier League	25	3	5	3	—		—		30	6
Baku	2012–13	Azerbaijan Premier League	25	2	2	0	—		2	0	29	2
Baku	2013–14	Azerbaijan Premier League	16	1	2	0	—		—		18	1
Domžale	2014–15	Slovenian PrvaLiga	9	2	2	0	—		—		11	2
Domžale	2015–16	Slovenian PrvaLiga	24	1	3	0	—		1	0	28	1
Domžale	2016–17	Slovenian PrvaLiga	8	3	1	0	—		6	0	15	3
Career total			263	32	31	6	3	1	24	1	321	40

== Honours ==
Domžale

- Slovenian PrvaLiga: 2006–07, 2007–08
- Slovenian Cup: 2010–11, 2016–17
- Slovenian Supercup: 2007, 2011

Baku

- Azerbaijan Cup: 2011–12
