= Giorgos Pelagias =

Cypriot footballer (born 1985)

Personal information
- Full name: Giorgos Pelagias
- Date of birth: 10 May 1985 (age 41)
- Place of birth: Nicosia, Cyprus
- Height: 1.87 m (6 ft 2 in)
- Position: Centre back

Senior career*
Years	Team	Apps	(Gls)
2000–2006	Olympiakos Nicosia	52	(3)
2006–2010	Kerkyra	70	(1)
2010–2011	Atletico Roma	12	(1)
2011–2012	Barletta Calcio	14	(1)
2012–2013	Olympiakos Nicosia	24	(1)
2013–2015	Baku	34	(0)
2015– 2016	Tatabánya	8	(0)
2016	FK Trakai	8	(0)
2017	Apollon Limassol	5	(0)
2018–2019	ASIL Lysi		

International career^{‡}
2011	Cyprus	2	(0)
- * Club domestic league appearances and goals as of 15:37, 31 May 2017 (UTC) ‡ National team caps and goals as of February 2012

Giorgos Pelagias (Greek: Γιώργος Πελαγίας) (born 10 May 1985 in Nicosia) is a Cypriot footballer, who last played for ASIL Lysi.

== Career ==
Pelagias joined Kerkyra in July 2006 where he signed a 4-year contract.

On 1 August 2013 Pelagias joined Azerbaijan Premier League side FK Baku.

Pelagias joined ASIL Lysi in August 2018. He left the club again at the end of the season.

== Career statistics ==
As of 29 May 2015

Club performance			League		Cup		Continental		Total	
Season	Club	League	Apps	Goals	Apps	Goals	Apps	Goals	Apps	Goals
2002–03	Olympiakos Nicosia	Cypriot First Division	4	0			-		4	0
2003–04	Olympiakos Nicosia	Cypriot First Division	14	0			-		14	0
2004–05	Olympiakos Nicosia	Cypriot First Division	16	1			-		16	1
2005–06	Olympiakos Nicosia	Cypriot First Division	10	1			-		10	1
2006–07	Kerkyra	Super League Greece	8	1			-		8	1
2007–08	Kerkyra	Beta Ethniki	22	0			-		22	0
2008–09	Kerkyra	Beta Ethniki	30	0			-		30	0
2009–10	Kerkyra	Beta Ethniki	10	0			-		10	0
2010–11	Atletico Roma	Lega Pro Prima Divisione	12	1			-		12	1
2011–12	Barletta	Lega Pro Prima Divisione	14	1			-		14	1
2012–13	Olympiakos Nicosia	Cypriot Second Division	22	1	2	0	-		24	1
2013–14	Baku	Azerbaijan Premier League	13	0	1	0	-		14	0
2014–15	Baku	Azerbaijan Premier League	21	0	3	0	-		24	0
Total	Cyprus		66	2			0	0	66	2
Total	Greece		70	1			0	0	70	1
Total	Italy		26	2			0	0	26	2
Total	Azerbaijan		34	0	4	0	0	0	38	0
Career total			196	5	4	0	0	0	200	5
