= Mario Martínez (footballer, born 1985) =

Spanish footballer

Personal information
- Full name: Mario Martínez Rubio
- Date of birth: 25 March 1985 (age 41)
- Place of birth: Soria, Spain
- Height: 1.73 m (5 ft 8 in)
- Position: Midfielder

Youth career
- Almazán
- Numancia

Senior career*
| Years | Team | Apps | (Gls) |
| 2002–2004 | Numancia B | | |
| 2003–2011 | Numancia | 119 | (6) |
| 2006 | → Las Palmas (loan) | 10 | (0) |
| 2007 | → Zamora (loan) | 15 | (1) |
| 2011–2012 | Real Unión | 24 | (2) |
| 2012 | Olympiakos Nicosia | 8 | (0) |
| 2013–2014 | Baku | 5 | (1) |
| 2014–2015 | Tarazona | 11 | (1) |
| 2015 | Jaguares Córdoba | 4 | (0) |
| 2015–2016 | Blooming | 16 | (4) |
| 2016 | Boavista | 13 | (1) |
| 2016–2017 | Kissamikos | 29 | (5) |
| 2017 | Puerto Rico FC | 12 | (0) |
| 2018 | Olimpia Grudziądz | 11 | (0) |
| 2018–2019 | Kalamata | 7 | (2) |
| 2019 | Aittitos Spata | 5 | (0) |
| 2019 | Chania | 1 | (0) |
| 2020 | I Sparti | | |
| 2020–2021 | Platanias | | |
| 2021–2022 | Granitis Agias Marinas | | |
- * Club domestic league appearances and goals

Mario Martínez Rubio (born 25 March 1985) is a Spanish former professional footballer who played as a midfielder.

== Football career ==
A product of hometown club CD Numancia's youth system, Mario first appeared with their first team during 2002–03's second division – two games – then played 34 times scoring three goals in the 2007–08 season as the Soria side returned to La Liga after a three-year absence.

On 31 August 2008, four years after making his top-flight debut, Mario netted the only goal as Numancia surprisingly defeated FC Barcelona at home in what was Pep Guardiola's first league game as a manager. It would be his only in the campaign, as the team were immediately relegated.

After only 13 league matches out of 42 in 2010–11 (one complete), the 26-year-old Mario was released by Numancia, signing with Real Unión of the third level. He did not settle with any club or in any country in the following years, representing Olympiakos Nicosia, FC Baku, SD Tarazona and Jaguares de Córdoba.

On 3 July 2015, Mario joined Club Blooming in the Liga de Fútbol Profesional Boliviano. On 12 August, the team won their first Copa Cine Center after defeating Club Jorge Wilstermann 4–0 in the final, and he scored the opening goal.

Mario continuously switched clubs and countries in the following years, representing Boavista FC, PGS Kissamikos, Puerto Rico FC and Olimpia Grudziądz.
