= Edin Nuredinoski =

Macedonian footballer (born 1981)

Personal information
- Date of birth: 21 April 1981 (age 45)
- Place of birth: Skopje, Republic of Macedonia
- Height: 1.95 m (6 ft 5 in)
- Position: Goalkeeper

Senior career*
Years	Team	Apps	(Gls)
1999–2001	Vardar	5	(0)
2001–2005	Sloga Jugomagnat	16	(0)
2005–2006	Pobeda	21	(0)
2006	GVO Oldenburg		
2007	Eintracht Braunschweig	0	(0)
2007	Cementarnica	2	(0)
2008–2009	Milano Kumanovo	33	(0)
2009–2012	Ethnikos Achna	90	(0)
2012–2014	FC Baku	24	(0)
2015–2016	Aris Limassol	23	(0)
2016–2017	Ermis Aradippou	9	(0)
2017–2019	Aris Limassol	44	(0)

International career^{‡}
2009–2012	Macedonia	14	(0)
- * Club domestic league appearances and goals as of 22:48, 31 May 2019 (UTC) ‡ National team caps and goals as of 15 November 2011

Edin Nuredinoski (Macedonian: Един Нурединоски; born 21 April 1982) is a Macedonian footballer who last played as a goalkeeper for Aris Limassol in the Cypriot First Division.

== Club career ==
Nuredinoski spent half a season at 2.Bundesliga side Eintracht Braunschweig, but did not play a league game.

In July 2012 he signed a two-year contract with Azerbaijan Premier League side FC Baku. Nuredinoski left Baku in early May 2014 due to unpaid wages.

== International career ==
Nuredinoski made his debut for Macedonia on 11 October 2009 in a 2-1 friendly win over Qatar and has earned a total of 14 caps, scoring no goals. His final international was a May 2012 friendly against Angola.

== Career statistics ==
As of match played 2 May 2014

Club performance			League		Cup		Continental		Total	
Season	Club	League	Apps	Goals	Apps	Goals	Apps	Goals	Apps	Goals
2009–10	Ethnikos Achna	Cypriot First Division	30	0			-		30	0
2010–11	Ethnikos Achna	Cypriot First Division	30	0			-		30	0
2011–12	Ethnikos Achna	Cypriot First Division	30	0	6	0	-		36	0
2012–13	Baku	Azerbaijan Premier League	24	0	4	0	-		28	0
2013–14	Baku	Azerbaijan Premier League	0	0	0	0	-		0	0
Total	Cyprus		90	0	6	0	-		96	0
Total	Azerbaijan		24	0	4	0	-		28	0
Career total			114	0	10	0	-		124	0

== Honours ==
FK Vardar Skopje

- First Macedonian Football League Runner-up: 2000-01

FK Sloga Jugomagnat

- Macedonian Cup: 2003-04

FK Milano Kumanovo

- First Macedonian Football League: 2008-09
