= Junior Team Futebol =

- Full name: Junior Team Futebol S/S Ltda
- Founded: 5 February 2001 as Londrina Junior Team
- Ground: Estádio Erick Georg, Rolândia
- Capacity: 2,200
- President: Iran Campos dos Santos
- Head Coach: Alessio da Costa Antunes
- League: Campeonato Paranaense 3ª Divisão
- 2010: Campeonato Paranaense 3ª Divisão, 3rd
- Website: http://www.juniorteamfutebol.com.br/
Home colours	Away colours	Third colours

Junior Team Futebol S/S Ltda is a Brazilian football club from the city of Londrina, Paraná state. Found in 2001 as Londrina Junior Team, the team was an affiliated club of Londrina Esporte Clube but now a separate entity. CBF registration number: 00207PR

== History ==
Found 2001 as Londrina Junior Team S/S Ltda, the club was part of Londrina Esporte Clube's youth system. The team also hired its youth products in professional contract, and loaned them to Brazilian clubs or even moved abroad. The club later became a separate club as Junior Team Futebol S/S Ltda and stopped the connection with Londrina Esporte Clube.

The club hired professional players but not participated in senior competitions for 9 years. In 2010, the team played in Campeonato Paranaense 3ª Divisão, the lowest level in the state league of Paraná which had professional (or semi-professional level, opposite to amateur). The team also played its home match on Estádio Erick Georg, home of Nacional de Rolândia.
