= 2011–12 Neftchi Baku PFK season =

Neftchi Baku
2011-12 season
- Chairman: Sadyg Sadygov
- Manager: Boyukagha Hajiyev
- Stadium: Tofik Bakhramov Stadium, Ismat Gayibov Stadium
- Premier League: 1st
- Azerbaijan Cup: Runners Up
- Champions League: Second Qualifying Round vs Dinamo Zagreb
- Top goalscorer: League: Bahodir Nasimov (14); All: Bahodir Nasimov (16)
- Highest home attendance: 4,500 Khazar Lankaran; 24 March 2012
- Lowest home attendance: 300 vs Turan; 29 October 2011
- Average home league attendance: 1,619
Home colours	Away colours

The Neftchi Baku 2011–12 season is Neftchi Baku's twentieth Azerbaijan Premier League season, and their first season under manager Boyukagha Hajiyev.

== Squad ==
As of 15 February 2012

Note: Flags indicate national team as defined under FIFA eligibility rules; some limited exceptions apply. Players may hold more than one non-FIFA nationality.

No.	Pos.	Nation	Player
1	GK	AZE	Rauf Mehdiyev
2	DF	AZE	Rail Malikov (captain)
3	MF	BRA	Denis Silva
5	DF	MKD	Igor Mitreski
6	MF	MKD	Slavčo Georgievski
7	MF	BRA	Rodriguinho
8	MF	AZE	Elshan Abdullayev
9	MF	BRA	Flavinho
11	FW	AZE	Javid Huseynov
12	GK	AZE	Elchin Sadygov
14	FW	UZB	Bahodir Nasimov
15	DF	AZE	Ruslan Abishov
16	MF	BRA	Alessandro

No.	Pos.	Nation	Player
18	DF	AZE	Ruslan Amirjanov
19	MF	AZE	Mirhuseyn Seyidov
20	MF	AZE	Elvin Musazade
21	FW	AZE	Aghabala Ramazanov
22	FW	AZE	Farid Guliev
25	MF	AZE	Javid Imamverdiyev
26	DF	AZE	Karim Diniyev
27	MF	AZE	Rashad Abdullayev
28	FW	AZE	Emin Mehdiyev
29	FW	AZE	Ilham Allahverdiyev
30	GK	SRB	Saša Stamenković
32	DF	AZE	Elvin Yunuszade

== Transfers ==
=== Summer ===
In: Note: Flags indicate national team as defined under FIFA eligibility rules; some limited exceptions apply. Players may hold more than one non-FIFA nationality.

No.	Pos.	Nation	Player
14	FW	UZB	Bahodir Nasimov (from (Russia) Rubin Kazan, previously on loan)
17	MF	AZE	Araz Abdullayev (on loan from (England) Everton)
20	MF	AZE	Elvin Musazade (loan return from (Azerbaijan) Simurq)
22	FW	AZE	Farid Guliev (loan return from (Azerbaijan) Simurq)
30	GK	SRB	Saša Stamenković (from (Serbia) Red Star)
32	DF	AZE	Elvin Yunuszade (loan return from (Azerbaijan) Simurq)

Out: Note: Flags indicate national team as defined under FIFA eligibility rules; some limited exceptions apply. Players may hold more than one non-FIFA nationality.

No.	Pos.	Nation	Player
4	MF	ALG	Yacine Hima (to (Switzerland) FC Wil)
28	MF	AZE	Amit Guluzade (to (Turkey) Kayseri Erciyesspor)
—	GK	AZE	Emil Balayev (on loan to (Azerbaijan) Sumgayit City)
—	DF	AZE	Slavik Alkhasov (on loan to (Azerbaijan) Sumgayit City)
—	DF	AZE	Ruslan Tagizade (on loan to (Azerbaijan) Sumgayit City)
—	MF	AZE	Eshgin Guliyev (on loan to (Azerbaijan) Sumgayit City)
—	MF	AZE	Kamil Nurähmädov (on loan to (Azerbaijan) Sumgayit City)
—	FW	AZE	Orkhan Hasanov (on loan to (Azerbaijan) Sumgayit City)
—	FW	AZE	Ruslan Qurbanov (on loan to (Azerbaijan) Sumgayit City)

=== Winter ===
In: Note: Flags indicate national team as defined under FIFA eligibility rules; some limited exceptions apply. Players may hold more than one non-FIFA nationality.

No.	Pos.	Nation	Player

Out: Note: Flags indicate national team as defined under FIFA eligibility rules; some limited exceptions apply. Players may hold more than one non-FIFA nationality.

No.	Pos.	Nation	Player
4	DF	AZE	Tärlän Quliyev (on loan to (Azerbaijan) Sumgayit)
8	MF	AZE	Elmar Bakhshiev (to (Azerbaijan) Gabala)
10	FW	BEL	Émile Mpenza
13	DF	AZE	Tural Narimanov (on loan to (Azerbaijan) AZAL)
17	MF	AZE	Araz Abdullayev (Loan return (England) Everton)
23	DF	AZE	Eltun Yagublu (to (Azerbaijan) Qarabağ)
—	MF	AZE	Nijat Gurbanov (on loan to (Azerbaijan) Simurq)

== Competitions ==
=== 2011-12 Azerbaijan Premier League ===
==== Results summary ====
Overall								Home						Away					
Pld	W	D	L	GF	GA	GD	Pts	W	D	L	GF	GA	GD	W	D	L	GF	GA	GD
22	16	1	5	45	17	+28	49	10	0	1	30	6	+24	6	1	4	15	11	+4

Last updated: 21 December 2011.
Source: Soccerway

==== Results by round ====
Round	1	2	3	4	5	6	7	8	9	10	11	12	13	14	15	16	17	18	19	20	21	22
Ground	A	H	A	A	H	H	A	H	A	H	H	H	A	A	H	H	A	H	A	H	A	A
Result	W	W	L	L	W	W	W	L	D	W	W	W	L	W	W	W	L	W	W	W	W	W
Position	4	2	4	8	5	2	2	3	4	2	2	2	2	1	1	1	1	1	1	1	1	1

Source: Soccerway
A = Away; H = Home; W = Win; D = Draw; L = Loss

==== Results ====
14 August 2011 1	Ravan Baku	0–1	Neftchi	Dalga Arena
18:00 AZST (UTC+5)		Summary	Nasimov 17'	Attendance: 2,000; Referee: Elnur Muradov

21 August 2011 2	Neftchi	4–0	Sumgayit	Tofig Bahramov Stadium
21:00 AZST (UTC+5)	Flavinho 20'; R Abdullayev 25'; Nasimov 42', 59'	Summary		Attendance: 400; Referee: Rauf Jabbarov

27 August 2011 3	AZAL	3–1	Neftchi	AZAL Stadium
19:00 AZST (UTC+5)	Mammadov 45', 72'; Bulku 56'	Summary	Georgievski 57'	Attendance: 1,400; Referee: Fariz Yusifov

10 September 2011 4	Khazar	1–0	Neftchi	Lankaran City Stadium
20:00 AZST (UTC+5)	Abishov 41' (og.)	Summary		Attendance: 14,000; Referee: Ramil Diniyev

18 September 2011 5	Neftchi	2–0	Gabala FC	Tofiq Bahramov Stadium
20:00 AZST (UTC+5)	R. Abdullayev 64'; A. Abdullayev 85'	Summary		Attendance: 1,000; Referee: Anar Salmanov

23 September 2011 6	Neftchi	1–0	Baku	Tofig Bahramov Stadium
18:00 AZST (UTC+5)	Denis 86'	Summary		Attendance: 800; Referee: Elchin Mammadov

30 September 2011 7	Simurq	1–2	Neftchi	Zaqatala City Stadium
19:00 AZST (UTC+5)	Mikayilov 86'	Summary	Seyidov 8'; Guliev 90'	Attendance: 2,500; Referee: Rovshan Ahmadov

16 October 2011 8	Neftchi	0–1	Inter Baku	Ismat Gayibov Stadium
15:30 AZST (UTC+5)	Abishov (red card) 82'	Summary	Tskhadadze 34'; Zargarov (red card) 80'	Attendance: 1,500; Referee: Elchin Mammadov

22 October 2011 9	Kəpəz	1–1	Neftchi	Ganja City Stadium
15:00 AZST (UTC+5)	Antic 19'	Summary	Guliev 48'	Attendance: 8,000; Referee: Anar Salmanov

25 October 2011 10	Neftchi	3–2	Qarabağ	Ismat Gayibov Stadium
15:00 AZT (UTC+4)	R Abdullayev 27'; Teli 67' (og.); Flavinho 72'	Summary	Ismayilov 4', 24'	Attendance: 2,000; Referee: Rovshan Ahmadov

29 October 2011 11	Neftchi	1–0	Turan	Dalga Arena
15:00 AZT (UTC+4)	Nasimov 90'	Summary		Attendance: 300; Referee: Jeyhun Hashimov

6 November 2011 12	Neftchi	5–0	Khazar	Ismat Gayibov Stadium
14:30 AZT (UTC+4)	Flavinho 19', 33'; Nasimov 68', 80'; Guliev 90'	Summary		Attendance: 2,500; Referee: Elnur Muradov

20 November 2011 13	Gabala	1–0	Neftchi	Gabala City Stadium
14:00 AZT (UTC+4)	Chertoganov 39'	Summary		Attendance: 2,500; Referee: Ramil Diniyev

26 November 2011 14	Qarabağ	1–2	Neftchi	Guzanli Olympic Complex Stadium
14:00 AZT (UTC+4)	Ismayilov 65'	Summary	Abishov 9'; Flavinho 88'	Attendance: 2,000; Referee: Anar Salmanov

4 December 2011 15	Neftchi	4–2	Simurq	Ismat Gayibov Stadium
14:00 AZT (UTC+4)	Abdullayev 10', 36'; Nasimov 69'; Abishov 75'	Summary	Poškus 18'; Grebis 90+2'	Attendance: 1,000; Referee: Fariz Yusifov

11 December 2011 16	Neftchi	7–1	AZAL	Ismat Gayibov Stadium
14:00 AZT (UTC+4)	Kvirtiya 3' (o.g.); Nasimov 11' (pen.), 19', 32'; Huseynov 52'; Flavinho 56'; Georgievski 77'	Summary	Benouahi 64'	Attendance: 2,000; Referee: Aliyar Agayev

17 December 2011 17	Inter Baku	2–1	Neftchi	Shafa Stadium
17:00 AZT (UTC+4)	Tskhadadze 63'; Kandelaki 71'	Summary	R.Abdullayev 41'	Attendance: 3,000; Referee: Elchin Mämmädov

21 December 2011 18	Neftchi	2–0	Kəpəz	Ismat Gayibov Stadium
14:00 AZT (UTC+4)	Flavinho 18' (pen.); Nasimov 44'; Mitreski (yellow card) 45+1' (yellow-red card) 55'	Summary	Feutchine (yellow card) 40' (yellow-red card) 66'	Attendance: 850; Referee: Anar Salmanov

15 February 2012 19	Sumgayit	0–3	Neftchi	Shafa Stadium
14:00 AZT (UTC+4)		Summary	Flavinho 45'; Nasimov 49', 85'	Attendance: 500; Referee: Anar Salmanov

21 February 2012 20	Neftchi	1–0	Ravan Baku	Ismat Gayibov Stadium
14:30 AZT (UTC+4)	Flavinho 83'	Summary		Attendance: 1,000; Referee: Fariz Yusifov

3 March 2012 21	Turan Tovuz	0–1	Neftchi	Tovuz City Stadium
14:00 AZT (UTC+4)		Summary	Abdullayev 75'	Attendance: 1,500; Referee: Rovshan Ahmadov

7 March 2012 22	Baku	1–3	Neftchi	Ismat Gayibov Stadium
15:00 AZT (UTC+4)	Novruzov 87'	[ Summary]	Abishov 7'; Abdullayev 36'; Amirjanov 40'	Attendance: 2,000; Referee: Fariz Yusifov

==== League table ====
Pos	Team	Pld	W	D	L	GF	GA	GD	Pts	Qualification
1	Neftçi Baku	22	16	1	5	45	17	+28	49	Qualification for championship group
2	Inter Baku	22	13	6	3	21	10	+11	45	Qualification for championship group
3	Khazar Lankaran	22	13	5	4	33	19	+14	44	Qualification for championship group
4	Qarabağ	22	12	5	5	27	14	+13	41	Qualification for championship group
5	Baku	22	10	5	7	27	22	+5	35	Qualification for championship group

Source: Soccerway: Azerbaijan Premier League Table
Rules for classification: 1) points; 2) goal difference; 3) number of goals scored.

=== 2011-12 Azerbaijan Premier League Championship Group ===
==== Results summary ====
Overall								Home						Away					
Pld	W	D	L	GF	GA	GD	Pts	W	D	L	GF	GA	GD	W	D	L	GF	GA	GD
10	4	2	4	10	13	−3	14	3	1	1	7	5	+2	1	1	3	3	8	−5

Last updated: 21 December 2011.
Source: Soccerway

==== Results by round ====
Round	1	2	3	4	5	6	7	8	9	10
Ground	A	A	H	A	H	H	A	H	A	H
Result	L	W	D	D	W	W	L	W	L	L
Position	1	1	1	1	1	1	1	1	1	1

Source: Soccerway
A = Away; H = Home; W = Win; D = Draw; L = Loss

==== Results ====
11 March 2012 23	Gabala	4–1	Neftchi	Gabala City Stadium
14:00 AZT (UTC+4)	Dodo 18', 27'; Kamanan 78', 83'	Summary	Nasimov 68'	Attendance: 1,000; Referee: Aliyar Agayev

18 March 2012 24	Inter Baku	1–2	Neftchi	Shafa Stadium
16:00 AZT (UTC+4)	Červenka 45'	Summary	Georgievski 5'; Amirjanov 77'	Attendance: 2,000; Referee: Fariz Yusifov

24 March 2012 25	Neftchi	1–1	Khazar Lankaran	Ismat Gayibov Stadium
15:00 AZT (UTC+4)	Abishov 26'	Summary	Amirguliev 55'	Attendance: 4,500; Referee: Aliyar Agayev

1 April 2012 26	Qarabağ	0–0	Neftchi	Guzanli Olympic Complex Stadium
16:00 AZST (UTC+5)		Summary		Attendance: 3,500; Referee: Anar Salmanov

8 April 2012 27	Neftchi	2–1	Baku	Ismat Gayibov Stadium
16:00 AZST (UTC+5)	Flavinho 21'; Nasimov 52'	Summary	Parks 87'	Attendance: 1,550; Referee: Fariz Yusifov

14 April 2012 28	Neftchi	2–1	Inter Baku	Ismat Gayibov Stadium
17:30 AZST (UTC+5)	Nasimov 5'; Georgievski 12'	Summary	Abishov 43' (o.g.)	Attendance: 2,500; Referee: Anar Salmanov

22 April 2012 29	Khazar Lankaran	1–0	Neftchi	Lankaran City Stadium
18:00 AZST (UTC+5)	Ricardo 52'	Summary		Attendance: 1,200; Referee: Elchin Mämmädov

29 April 2012 30	Neftchi	2–1	Qarabağ	Ismat Gayibov Stadium
17:00 AZST (UTC+5)	Abdullayev 71'; Abishov 90+1' (pen.)	Summary	Javadov 67'; Medvedev (red card) 90'	Attendance: 2,500; Referee: Rahim Hasanov

5 May 2012 31	Baku	2–0	Neftchi	Tofig Bakhramov Stadium
17:30 AZST (UTC+5)	Novruzov 44'; Koke 90'	Summary		Attendance: 1,000; Referee: Orkhan Mammadov

11 May 2012 32	Neftchi	0–1	Gabala	Ismat Gayibov Stadium
17:30 AZST (UTC+5)		Summary	Yunanov 87'	Attendance: 1,500; Referee: Fariz Yusifov

==== Championship group ====
Pos	Team	Pld	W	D	L	GF	GA	GD	Pts	Qualification or relegation
1	Neftçi Baku (C)	32	20	3	9	55	30	+25	63	Qualification for Champions League second qualifying round
2	Khazar Lankaran	32	17	8	7	44	28	+16	59	Qualification for Europa League first qualifying round (Note: Baku qualified for the first qualifiying round of the 2012–13 UEFA Europa League as winner of the 2011–12 Azerbaijan Cup.)
3	Inter Baku	32	16	8	8	29	21	+8	56	Qualification for Europa League first qualifying round
4	Qarabağ	32	15	8	9	37	28	+9	53	
5	Gabala	32	15	7	10	43	32	+11	52	
6	Baku	32	15	5	12	42	37	+5	50	Qualification for Europa League first qualifying round

Source: Soccerway.com
Rules for classification: 1) points; 2) goal difference; 3) number of goals scored.
(C) Champions

=== 2011-12 Azerbaijan Cup Results ===
29 November 2011 Last 16	Simurq	0–1	Neftchi Baku	Zaqatala City Stadium
16:00 AZT (UTC+4)	Yanotovsky (red card) 83'	Summary	Nasimov 15'; Flavinho (red card) 30'	Attendance: 2,500; Referee: Rahim Hasanov

14 March 2012 Quarter Finals; 1st Leg	Kapaz	1–2	Neftchi Baku	Ganja City Stadium
14:00 AZT (UTC+4)	Fomenko 84'; Svezhentsev (red card) 90'	Summary	Denis 27'; Abdullayev 79'	Attendance: 6,500; Referee: Anar Salmanov

28 March 2012 Quarter Finals; 2nd Leg	Neftchi Baku	1–1 (3–2 agg.)	Kapaz	Ismat Gayibov Stadium
16:00 AZT (UTC+4)	Nasimov 50'; Seyidov (red card) 79'	Summary	Fomenko 33'; Ismayilov (red card) 79'	Attendance: 1,500; Referee: Rahim Hasanov

18 April 2012 Semi Final; 1st Leg	Inter Baku	0–0	Neftchi Baku	Shafa Stadium
18:00 AZST (UTC+5)		Summary		Attendance: 1,000; Referee: Aliyar Agayev

25 April 2012 Semi Final; 2nd Leg	Neftchi Baku	1–0 (1–0 agg.)	Inter Baku	Ismat Gayibov Stadium
17:20 AZST (UTC+5)	Imamverdiyev 22'	Summary		Attendance: 1,000; Referee: Fariz Yusifov

==== Final ====
17 May 2012	Baku	2–0	Neftchi Baku	Dalga Arena
20:00 AZST (UTC+5)	Koke 8'; Juninho 27'	Summary	Denis (yellow card) 60' (yellow-red card) 82'	Attendance: 4,300; Referee: Aliyar Ağayev

=== UEFA Champions League ===
==== Qualifying phase ====
13 July 2011 2nd qualifying round 1st leg	Dinamo Zagreb (Croatia)	3–0	(Azerbaijan) Neftchi	Zagreb
23:00 AZST (UTC+5)	Badelj 37'; Krstanović 46', 65' (pen.)	Report		Stadium: Stadion Maksimir; Attendance: 33,266; Referee: Antony Gautier (France)

19 July 2011 2nd qualifying round 2nd leg	Neftchi (Azerbaijan)	0–0 (0–3 agg.)	(Croatia) Dinamo Zagreb	Baku
21:00 AZST (UTC+5)		Report		Stadium: Tofiq Bahramov Stadium; Attendance: 7,000; Referee: Hannes Kaasik (Estonia)

=== Kadyrov Cup ===
==== Group stage ====
29 January 2012	Metalist Kharkiv (Ukraine)	3–1	(Azerbaijan) Neftchi	Antalya, Turkey

30 January 2012	Polonia Warsaw (Poland)	1–3	(Azerbaijan) Neftchi	Antalya, Turkey

1 February 2012	Pakhtakor (Uzbekistan)	0–3	(Azerbaijan) Neftchi	Antalya, Turkey

==== Match for third place ====
3 February 2012	Terek Grozny (Russia)	0–3	(Azerbaijan) Neftchi	Antalya, Turkey

== Squad statistics ==
=== Appearances and goals ===
As of 21 May 2012

No.	Pos	Nat	Player	Total		Premier League		Azerbaijan Cup		Champions League	
No.	Pos	Nat	Player	Apps	Goals	Apps	Goals	Apps	Goals	Apps	Goals
1	GK	(Azerbaijan) AZE	Rauf Mehdiyev	12	0	10+0	0	2+0	0	0+0	0
2	DF	(Azerbaijan) AZE	Rail Malikov	29	0	25+0	0	2+0	0	2+0	0
3	MF	(Brazil) BRA	Denis Silva	38	1	29+1	1	6+0	0	2+0	0
5	DF	(North Macedonia) MKD	Igor Mitreski	34	0	27+0	0	6+0	0	1+0	0
6	DF	(North Macedonia) MKD	Slavčo Georgievski	39	4	31+1	4	5+0	0	2+0	0
7	MF	(Brazil) BRA	Rodriguinho	2	0	0+0	0	0+0	0	2+0	0
9	FW	(Brazil) BRA	Flavinho	34	10	28+0	10	4+0	0	2+0	0
11	FW	(Azerbaijan) AZE	Javid Huseynov	32	1	11+14	1	4+1	0	0+2	0
14	FW	(Uzbekistan) UZB	Bahodir Nasimov	36	18	28+1	16	4+1	2	1+1	0
15	DF	(Azerbaijan) AZE	Ruslan Abishov	37	5	30+0	5	5+0	0	2+0	0
16	MF	(Brazil) BRA	Alessandro	24	0	19+1	0	2+1	0	1+0	0
18	DF	(Azerbaijan) AZE	Ruslan Amirjanov	28	2	20+1	2	5+1	0	1+0	0
19	MF	(Azerbaijan) AZE	Mirhuseyn Seyidov	26	1	18+4	1	3+0	0	0+1	0
20	MF	(Azerbaijan) AZE	Elvin Musazade	0	0	0+0	0	0+0	0	0+0	0
21	FW	(Azerbaijan) AZE	Aghabala Ramazanov	1	0	0+1	0	0+0	0	0+0	0
22	FW	(Azerbaijan) AZE	Farid Guliev	18	3	4+9	3	2+3	0	0+0	0
25	MF	(Azerbaijan) AZE	Javid Imamverdiyev	30	1	7+16	0	4+1	1	0+2	0
26	DF	(Azerbaijan) AZE	Karim Diniyev	1	0	1+0	0	0+0	0	0+0	0
27	MF	(Azerbaijan) AZE	Rashad Abdullayev	32	7	26+1	7	3+0	0	2+0	0
28	FW	(Azerbaijan) AZE	Emin Mehdiyev	8	0	2+3	0	3+0	0	0+0	0
29	FW	(Azerbaijan) AZE	Ilham Allahverdiyev	0	0	0+0	0	0+0	0	0+0	0
30	GK	(Serbia) SRB	Saša Stamenković	27	0	21+0	0	4+0	0	2+0	0
32	DF	(Azerbaijan) AZE	Elvin Yunuszade	13	0	9+1	0	3+0	0	0+0	0
--	DF	(Azerbaijan) AZE	Elshan Abdullayev	7	1	0+4	0	0+3	1	0+0	0
Players who appeared for Neftchi no longer at the club:
4	DF	(Azerbaijan) AZE	Tärlän Quliyev	5	0	3+2	0	0+0	0	0+0	0
10	FW	(Belgium) BEL	Émile Mpenza	9	0	0+7	0	0+0	0	2+0	0
12	GK	(Azerbaijan) AZE	Elchin Sadygov	0	0	0+0	0	0+0	0	0+0	0
17	MF	(Azerbaijan) AZE	Araz Abdullayev	9	3	2+6	3	1+0	0	0+0	0
23	DF	(Azerbaijan) AZE	Elton Yagublu	0	0	0+0	0	0+0	0	0+0	0
--	DF	(Azerbaijan) AZE	Tural Narimanov	0	0	0+0	0	0+0	0	0+0	0

=== Goal scorers ===
Place	Position	Nation	Number	Name	Premier League	Azerbaijan Cup	Champions League	Total
1	FW	(Uzbekistan)	14	Bahodir Nasimov	16	2	0	18
2	FW	(Brazil)	9	Flavinho	10	0	0	10
3	MF	(Azerbaijan)	27	Rashad Abdullayev	7	0	0	7
4	DF	(Azerbaijan)	15	Ruslan Abishov	5	0	0	5
5	MF	(North Macedonia)	6	Slavčo Georgievski	4	0	0	4
6	MF	(Azerbaijan)	19	Araz Abdullayev	3	0	0	3
6	FW	(Azerbaijan)	22	Farid Guliev	3	0	0	3
8	FW	(Azerbaijan)	11	Javid Huseynov	2	0	0	2
8	DF	(Brazil)	3	Denis Silva	1	1	0	2
8	DF	(Azerbaijan)	18	Ruslan Amirjanov	2	0	0	2
11	MF	(Azerbaijan)	19	Mirhuseyn Seyidov	1	0	0	1
11	MF	(Azerbaijan)	25	Javid Imamverdiyev	0	1	0	1
11				Own goal	1	0	0	1
				TOTALS	55	4	0	59

=== Disciplinary record ===
Number	Nation	Position	Name	Premier League		Azerbaijan Cup		Champions League		Total	
Number	Nation	Position	Name	Yellow card	Red card	Yellow card	Red card	Yellow card	Red card	Yellow card	Red card
1	(Azerbaijan)	GK	Rauf Mehdiyev	0	0	2	0	0	0	2	0
2	(Azerbaijan)	DF	Rail Malikov	4	0	0	0	0	0	4	0
3	(Brazil)	DF	Denis Silva	5	0	3	1	0	0	8	1
5	(North Macedonia)	DF	Igor Mitreski	5	1	1	0	0	0	6	1
6	(North Macedonia)	DF	Slavčo Georgievski	2	0	2	0	0	0	4	0
9	(Brazil)	FW	Flavinho	8	0	0	1	0	0	8	1
11	(Azerbaijan)	MF	Javid Huseynov	3	0	2	0	0	0	5	0
14	(Uzbekistan)	FW	Bahodir Nasimov	3	0	1	0	0	0	4	0
15	(Azerbaijan)	DF	Ruslan Abishov	4	1	2	0	0	0	6	1
16	(Brazil)	MF	Alessandro	3	1	0	0	0	0	3	1
18	(Azerbaijan)	DF	Ruslan Amirjanov	4	0	0	0	0	0	4	0
19	(Azerbaijan)	MF	Mirhuseyn Seyidov	4	0	1	1	0	0	5	1
22	(Azerbaijan)	FW	Farid Guliev	1	0	0	0	0	0	1	0
25	(Azerbaijan)	MF	Javid Imamverdiyev	1	0	1	0	0	0	2	0
27	(Azerbaijan)	MF	Rashad Abdullayev	2	0	2	0	0	0	4	0
28	(Azerbaijan)	FW	Emin Mehdiyev	1	0	2	0	0	0	3	0
32	(Azerbaijan)	DF	Elvin Yunuszade	3	0	1	0	0	0	4	0
			TOTALS	48	3	17	3	0	0	65	6

=== Monthly awards ===
Month	Azerbaijan Professional Football League Awards	
Month	Player	Award
November	(Brazil) Flavinho	Won

=== Annual awards ===
Award	PFL Seasonal Awards	
Award	Player	Award
Player of the Year	(Brazil) Flavinho	Won
Manager of the Year	(Azerbaijan) Boyukagha Hajiyev	Won

== Team kit ==
These are the 2011–12 Neftchi Baku kits.

Supplier: Adidas
Sponsor(s): SOCAR

Home	Away
