= 2010–11 Neftchi Baku PFK season =

Neftchi Baku
2010-11 season
- Chairman: Sadyg Sadygov
- Manager: Arif Asadov
- Stadium: Tofik Bakhramov Stadium, Ismat Gayibov Stadium
- Premier League: 1st (champions)
- Azerbaijan Cup: Quarterfinals vs Khazar Lankaran
- Top goalscorer: League: Bahodir Nasimov (15); All: Bahodir Nasimov (15)
- Highest home attendance: 10,000 vs Khazar Lankaran; 13 February 2011
- Lowest home attendance: 300 vs MOIK Baku; 25 February 2011
- Average home league attendance: 2,547
Home colours	Away colours

The Neftchi Baku 2010–11 season is Neftchi Baku's nineteenth Azerbaijan Premier League season, and their only season under manager Arif Asadov.

== Squad ==
Note: Flags indicate national team as defined under FIFA eligibility rules; some limited exceptions apply. Players may hold more than one non-FIFA nationality.

No.	Pos.	Nation	Player
1	GK	AZE	Rauf Mehdiyev
2	DF	AZE	Rail Malikov (captain)
3	DF	BRA	Denis Silva
4	MF	ALG	Yacine Hima
5	DF	MKD	Igor Mitreski
6	MF	MKD	Slavčo Georgievski
7	MF	BRA	Rodriguinho
8	MF	AZE	Elmar Bakhshiev
9	MF	BRA	Flavinho
10	FW	BEL	Émile Mpenza
11	FW	AZE	Javid Huseynov
12	GK	AZE	Elchin Sadygov

No.	Pos.	Nation	Player
14	FW	UZB	Bahodir Nasimov
15	DF	AZE	Ruslan Abishov
16	MF	BRA	Alessandro
17	MF	AZE	Araz Abdullayev
18	DF	AZE	Ruslan Amirjanov
19	MF	AZE	Mirhuseyn Seyidov
22	FW	AZE	Ruslan Qurbanov
25	MF	AZE	Javid Imamverdiyev
26	DF	AZE	Tärlän Quliyev
27	MF	AZE	Rashad Abdullayev
28	FW	AZE	Amit Guluzade

=== On loan ===
Note: Flags indicate national team as defined under FIFA eligibility rules; some limited exceptions apply. Players may hold more than one non-FIFA nationality.

No. / Pos. / Nation / Player; 7 / MF / AZE / Farid Guliev (at Simurq)	No. / Pos. / Nation / Player

== Transfers ==
=== Summer ===
In: Note: Flags indicate national team as defined under FIFA eligibility rules; some limited exceptions apply. Players may hold more than one non-FIFA nationality.

No.	Pos.	Nation	Player
3	DF	BRA	Denis Silva (from (Brazil) Grêmio)
5	DF	MKD	Igor Mitreski (from (Bulgaria) CSKA Sofia)
6	MF	MKD	Slavčo Georgievski (from (Cyprus) Ethnikos Achnas)
9	FW	BRA	Flavinho (from (Brazil) Grêmio Barueri)
10	FW	BEL	Émile Mpenza (from (Switzerland) Sion)
14	FW	UZB	Bahodir Nasimov (On loan from (Russia) Rubin Kazan)
16	MF	BRA	Alessandro (from (Brazil) Vitória)
25	MF	AZE	Javid Imamverdiyev (from (Azerbaijan) FK Karvan)

Out: Note: Flags indicate national team as defined under FIFA eligibility rules; some limited exceptions apply. Players may hold more than one non-FIFA nationality.

No.	Pos.	Nation	Player
1	GK	SRB	Vladimir Mićović
3	DF	TUR	Suat Usta (to (Turkey) Diyarbakırspor)
4	DF	EST	Taavi Rähn (from (Russia) Baltika Kaliningrad)
7	FW	AZE	Samir Aliyev (to (Azerbaijan) Simurq)
9	FW	URU	Walter Guglielmone (to (Paraguay) Club Guaraní)
10	MF	ROU	Marian Aliuță
16	DF	EST	Dmitri Kruglov (to (Azerbaijan) Inter Baku)
20	FW	BRA	José Carlos
22	MF	AZE	Zaur Tagizade (Retired)
25	FW	ROU	Adrian Neaga (to (Romania) Unirea Urziceni)
26	MF	TKM	Nazar Baýramow (to (Uzbekistan) Qizilqum Zarafshon)
30	FW	CMR	Valentine Atem (to (Cameroon) Tiko United)
44	DF	GEO	Valeri Abramidze (to (Azerbaijan) Inter Baku)
—	FW	EST	Vladimir Voskoboinikov (to (Estonia) Levadia Tallinn)

=== Winter ===
In: Note: Flags indicate national team as defined under FIFA eligibility rules; some limited exceptions apply. Players may hold more than one non-FIFA nationality.

No.	Pos.	Nation	Player
4	MF	ALG	Yacine Hima (from (Belgium) Eupen)
7	MF	BRA	Rodriguinho (from (Brazil) Santos)

Out: Note: Flags indicate national team as defined under FIFA eligibility rules; some limited exceptions apply. Players may hold more than one non-FIFA nationality.

No.	Pos.	Nation	Player
7	MF	AZE	Farid Guliev (loan to (Azerbaijan) Simurq)
24	GK	LTU	Paulius Grybauskas (from (Poland) Wigry Suwałki)
30	MF	GEO	Vladimir Burduli
—	MF	ROU	Leonard Naidin (to (Romania) Mioveni)

== Competitions ==
=== Azerbaijan Premier League ===
==== First round ====
===== Results =====
8 August 2010 1	Neftchi Baku	1–1	Qarabağ	Tofik Bakhramov Stadium
21:00 AZST (UTC+5)	Nasimov 88'	Summary	Sadygov 80'	Attendance: 2,000; Referee: Fariz Yusifov

15 August 2010 2	Gabala	0–2	Neftchi Baku	Gabala City Stadium
18:00 AZST (UTC+5)		Report; Summary	Abdullayev 69'; Nasimov 75'	Attendance: 2,000; Referee: Anar Salmanov

21 August 2010 3	Neftchi Baku	4–0	Simurq	Tofik Bakhramov Stadium
21:00 AZST (UTC+5)	Nasimov 1', 44', 72'; Abdullayev 36'	Summary		Attendance: 1,000; Referee: Elnur Muradov

28 August 2010 4	Inter Baku	0–2	Neftchi Baku	Shafa Stadium
20:00 AZST (UTC+5)		Summary	Nasimov 33'; Flavinho 50' (pen.)	Attendance: 2,000; Referee: Anar Salmanov

14 September 2010 5	Neftchi Baku	1–0	Mughan	Tofik Bakhramov Stadium
19:00 AZST (UTC+5)	Nasimov 14' (pen.)	Summary		Attendance: 2,000; Referee: Ramil Diniyev

18 September 2010 6	MOIK Baku	0–4	Neftchi Baku	Shafa Stadium
19:00 AZST (UTC+5)		Summary	Guliev 24'; Nasimov 64', 70'; Huseynov 90+1'	Attendance: 1,000; Referee: Jeyhun Hashimov

25 September 2010 7	Khazar Lankaran	1–0	Neftchi Baku	Lankaran City Stadium
19:00 AZST (UTC+5)	Ruíz 89'	Summary		Attendance: 11,000; Referee: Vusal Aliyev

1 October 2010 8	Neftchi Baku	1–0	AZAL	Tofik Bakhramov Stadium
18:00 AZST (UTC+5)	Mpenza 3'	Summary		Attendance: 1,000; Referee: Afgan Hamzayev

17 October 2010 9	Turan Tovuz	2–2	Neftchi Baku	Tovuz City Stadium
15:00 AZST (UTC+5)	Gonţa 43'; Tchedia 87'	Summary	Flavinho 32'; Nasimov 66'	Attendance: 2,300; Referee: Jeyhun Hashimov

23 August 2010 10	Neftchi Baku	6–2	Ganja	Tofik Bakhramov Stadium
17:00 AZST (UTC+5)	Denis 3'; Flavinho 26'; Nasimov 69'; Mpenza 71'; Imamverdiyev 87'; Abdullayev 90'	Summary	Allahquliyev 18'; Mammadov (red card) 39'; Junivan 83'	Attendance: 1,000; Referee: Elchin Mämmädov

31 October 2010 11	Baku	0–2	Neftchi Baku	Tofik Bakhramov Stadium
17:15 AZT (UTC+4)		Summary	Flavinho 50'; Nasimov 71'	Attendance: 1,000; Referee: Fariz Yusifov

6 November 2010 12	Neftchi Baku	1–1	Inter Baku	Tofik Bakhramov Stadium
16:00 AZT (UTC+4)	Mpenza 83'	Summary	Zlatinov 61'	Attendance: 3,000; Referee: Rovshan Ahmadov

13 November 2010 13	FK Mughan	0–3	Neftchi Baku	Salyan Olympic Stadium
14:00 AZT (UTC+4)		Summary	Nasimov 29', 80'; Abdullayev 90+2'	Attendance: 1,000; Referee: Anar Salmanov

21 November 2010 14	Neftchi Baku	0–0	Gabala	Tofik Bakhramov Stadium
16:00 AZT (UTC+4)		Report; Summary		Attendance: 1,000; Referee: Fariz Yusifov

28 November 2010 15	Qarabağ	0–1	Neftchi Baku	Guzanli Olympic Stadium
15:00 AZT (UTC+4)		Summary	Abishov 56'	Attendance: 2,500; Referee: Rovshan Ahmadov

4 December 2010 16	AZAL	0–0	Neftchi Baku	Shafa Stadium
14:00 AZT (UTC+4)		Summary		Attendance: 1,500; Referee: Elchin Mämmädov

11 December 2010 17	Neftchi Baku	0–2	Baku	Tofik Bakhramov Stadium
18:00 AZT (UTC+4)		Summary	Denis 43' (o.g.); Jabá 76'	Attendance: 4,000; Referee: Rovshan Ahmadov

18 December 2010 18	Ganja	0–4	Neftchi Baku	Ganja City Stadium
14:00 AZT (UTC+4)		Summary	Mpenza 37'; Mitreski 64'; Abdullayev 73'; Nasimov 90'	Attendance: 8,200; Referee: Fariz Yusifov

23 December 2010 19	Neftchi Baku	2–0	Turan Tovuz	Tofik Bakhramov Stadium
15:00 AZT (UTC+4)	Abdullayev 17'; Mpenza 36'	Summary		Attendance: 500; Referee: Anar Salmanov

13 February 2011 20	Neftchi Baku	0–0	Khazar Lankaran	Tofik Bakhramov Stadium
18:00 AZT (UTC+4)		Summary		Attendance: 10,000; Referee: Vusal Aliyev

19 February 2011 21	Simurq	0–3	Neftchi Baku	Zaqatala City Stadium
15:00 AZT (UTC+4)		Summary	Abdullayev 11'; Abishov 22'; Flavinho 53'	Attendance: 1,000; Referee: Elchin Mämmädov

25 February 2011 22	Neftchi Baku	1–0	MOIK Baku	Tofik Bakhramov Stadium
16:00 AZT (UTC+4)	Flavinho 41'	Summary		Attendance: 300; Referee: Jeyhun Hashimov

===== Table =====
Pos	Team	Pld	W	D	L	GF	GA	GD	Pts	Qualification
1	Neftçi Baku	22	14	6	2	40	9	+31	48	Qualification for championship group
2	Khazar Lankaran	22	14	5	3	28	12	+16	47	Qualification for championship group
3	Qarabağ	22	13	3	6	30	14	+16	42	Qualification for championship group
4	Inter Baku	22	12	4	6	24	16	+8	40	Qualification for championship group
5	AZAL	22	9	9	4	27	16	+11	36	Qualification for championship group

Source: Soccerway.com
Rules for classification: 1) points; 2) goal difference; 3) number of goals scored.

==== Championship group ====
===== Results =====
13 March 2011 23	Baku	0–1	Neftchi Baku	Tofik Bakhramov Stadium
18:00 AZT (UTC+4)		Summary	Flavinho 8'	Attendance: 700; Referee: Afgan Hamzayev

18 March 2011 24	Khazar Lankaran	1–1	Neftchi Baku	Lankaran City Stadium
18:00 AZT (UTC+4)	Wobay 89' (pen.)	Summary	Rodriguinho 23'	Attendance: 15,000; Referee: Fariz Yusifov

3 April 2011 25	Neftchi Baku	2–0	Qarabağ	Tofik Bakhramov Stadium
16:00 AZST (UTC+5)	Rodriguinho 3'; Flavinho 60'	Summary		Attendance: 5,000; Referee: Rovshan Ahmadov

9 April 2011 26	Inter Baku	1–1	Neftchi Baku	Shafa Stadium
17:00 AZST (UTC+5)	Poškus 2'; Mzhavanadze (yellow card) 17' (yellow-red card) 85'	Summary	Flavinho 86' (pen.)	Attendance: 1,500; Referee: Afgan Hamzayev

17 April 2011 27	Neftchi Baku	2–1	AZAL	Tofik Bakhramov Stadium
16:00 AZST (UTC+5)	Abdullayev 49'; Mpenza 51'	Summary	Benouahi 6'	Attendance: 1,500; Referee: Ramil Diniyev

23 April 2011 28	Neftchi Baku	2–0	Baku	Tofik Bakhramov Stadium
16:00 AZST (UTC+5)	Flavinho 19', 54' (pen.)	Summary		Attendance: 500; Referee: Elnur Muradov

1 May 2011 29	AZAL	1–3	Neftchi Baku	AZAL Arena
20:00 AZST (UTC+5)	Petrov (yellow card) 75' (yellow-red card) 87'; Juska 90+1'	Summary	Huseynov 11'; Krjauklis 17' (o.g.); Rodriguinho 90'	Attendance: 3,000; Referee: Rovshan Ahmadov

8 May 2011 30	Neftchi Baku	0–0	Inter Baku	Tofik Bakhramov Stadium
15:40 AZST (UTC+5)		Summary		Attendance: 450; Referee: Aliyar Agayev

13 May 2011 31	Qarabağ	3–0	Neftchi Baku	Guzanli Olympic Stadium
15:00 AZST (UTC+5)	Adamia 5', 13', 49' (pen.)	Summary		Attendance: 3,000; Referee: Elchin Mämmädov

18 May 2011 32	Neftchi Baku	1–1	Khazar Lankaran	Tofik Bakhramov Stadium
20:00 AZST (UTC+5)	Imamverdiyev 46'; Abdullayev (yellow card) 32' (yellow-red card) 53'	Summary	Wobay 47'	Attendance: 7,500; Referee: Ramil Diniyev

===== Table =====
Pos	Team	Pld	W	D	L	GF	GA	GD	Pts	Qualification
1	Neftçi Baku (C)	32	19	10	3	53	17	+36	67	Qualification for Champions League second qualifying round
2	Khazar Lankaran	32	16	12	4	38	18	+20	60	Qualification for Europa League second qualifying round (Note: Khazar Lankaran won the 2010–11 Azerbaijan Cup and therefore qualified for the second qualifying round of the 2011–12 UEFA Europa League.)
3	Qarabağ	32	17	7	8	41	22	+19	58	Qualification for Europa League first qualifying round
4	AZAL	32	13	10	9	36	28	+8	49	Qualification for Europa League first qualifying round
5	Inter Baku	32	13	10	9	29	24	+5	49	
6	Baku	32	10	10	12	33	32	+1	40	

Source: Soccerway.com
Rules for classification: 1) points; 2) goal difference; 3) number of goals scored.
(C) Champions

=== Azerbaijan Cup ===
8 December 2010 Last 16	Ganja	1–3	Neftchi Baku	Ganja City Stadium
13:00 AZT (UTC+4)	Baranin 38'	Summary	Imamverdiyev 28'; Abdullayev 55'; Seyidov 68'	Attendance: 12,000; Referee: Aliyar Agayev

3 March 2011 Quarter Finals; 1st Leg	Neftchi Baku	3–4	Khazar Lankaran	Tofik Bakhramov Stadium
18:00 AZT (UTC+4)	Flavinho 32' (pen.), 63'; Georgievski 70'	Summary	Parks 12'; Scarlatache 36'; Wobay 45+2'; Mureşan 61'	Attendance: 5,000; Referee: Anar Salmanov

8 March 2011 Quarter Finals; 2nd Leg	Khazar Lankaran	1–1 (5–4 agg.)	Neftchi Baku	Lankaran City Stadium
18:00 AZT (UTC+4)	Parks 22'	Summary	Flavinho 9'	Attendance: 15,000; Referee: Vusal Aliyev

== Squad statistics ==
=== Appearances and goals ===
No.	Pos	Nat	Player	Total		Premier League		Azerbaijan Cup	
No.	Pos	Nat	Player	Apps	Goals	Apps	Goals	Apps	Goals
1	GK	(Azerbaijan) AZE	Rauf Mehdiyev	23	0	19+1	0	3+0	0
2	DF	(Azerbaijan) AZE	Rail Malikov	23	0	19+1	0	3+0	0
3	DF	(Brazil) BRA	Denis Silva	31	1	27+2	1	2+0	0
4	MF	(Algeria) ALG	Yacine Hima	7	0	1+6	0	0+0	0
5	DF	(North Macedonia) MKD	Igor Mitreski	33	1	29+1	1	3+0	0
6	MF	(North Macedonia) MKD	Slavčo Georgievski	32	1	29+0	0	3+0	1
7	MF	(Brazil) BRA	Rodriguinho	9	3	6+1	3	1+1	0
8	MF	(Azerbaijan) AZE	Elmar Bakhshiev	10	0	9+0	0	1+0	0
9	FW	(Brazil) BRA	Flavinho	22	14	20+0	11	2+0	3
10	FW	(Belgium) BEL	Émile Mpenza	24	6	15+8	6	0+1	0
11	FW	(Azerbaijan) AZE	Javid Huseynov	30	3	10+17	2	1+2	1
12	GK	(Azerbaijan) AZE	Elchin Sadygov	4	0	3+1	0	0+0	0
14	FW	(Uzbekistan) UZB	Bahodir Nasimov	31	15	28+0	15	3+0	0
15	DF	(Azerbaijan) AZE	Ruslan Abishov	28	2	24+1	2	3+0	0
16	MF	(Brazil) BRA	Alessandro	25	0	21+2	0	1+1	0
17	MF	(Azerbaijan) AZE	Araz Abdullayev	20	0	9+9	0	1+1	0
18	DF	(Azerbaijan) AZE	Ruslan Amirjanov	12	0	8+4	0	0+0	0
19	MF	(Azerbaijan) AZE	Mirhuseyn Seyidov	23	1	16+5	0	1+1	1
22	FW	(Azerbaijan) AZE	Ruslan Qurbanov	7	0	1+5	0	0+1	0
25	MF	(Azerbaijan) AZE	Javid Imamverdiyev	26	2	9+14	2	2+1	0
26	DF	(Azerbaijan) AZE	Tärlän Quliyev	5	0	5+0	0	0+0	0
27	MF	(Azerbaijan) AZE	Rashad Abdullayev	29	8	26+0	7	3+0	1
28	FW	(Azerbaijan) AZE	Amit Guluzade	9	0	2+7	0	0+0	0
Players who appeared for Neftchi who left on loan during the season:
7	MF	(Azerbaijan) AZE	Farid Guliev	13	1	4+7	1	1+1	0
Players who appeared for Neftchi who left during the season:
24	GK	(Lithuania) LTU	Paulius Grybauskas	10	0	10+0	0	0+0	0
30	MF	(Georgia (country)) GEO	Vladimir Burduli	1	0	0+1	0	0+0	0

=== Goal scorers ===
Place	Position	Nation	Number	Name	Premier League	Azerbaijan Cup	Total
1	FW	(Uzbekistan)	14	Bahodir Nasimov	15	0	15
2	FW	(Brazil)	9	Flavinho	11	3	14
3	MF	(Azerbaijan)	27	Rashad Abdullayev	7	0	7
4	FW	(Belgium)	10	Émile Mpenza	6	0	6
5	MF	(Brazil)	7	Rodriguinho	3	0	3
5	MF	(Azerbaijan)	25	Javid Imamverdiyev	2	1	3
7	FW	(Azerbaijan)	11	Javid Huseynov	2	0	2
7	DF	(Azerbaijan)	15	Ruslan Abishov	2	0	2
7	MF	(Azerbaijan)	17	Araz Abdullayev	1	1	2
10	DF	(Brazil)	3	Denis Silva	1	0	1
10	DF	(North Macedonia)	5	Igor Mitreski	1	0	1
10	FW	(Azerbaijan)	7	Farid Guliev	1	0	1
10	MF	(Azerbaijan)	19	Mirhuseyn Seyidov	0	1	1
10	MF	(North Macedonia)	6	Slavčo Georgievski	0	1	1
10				Own goal	1	0	1
				TOTALS	53	7	60

=== Disciplinary record ===
Number	Nation	Position	Name	Premier League		Azerbaijan Cup		Total	
Number	Nation	Position	Name	Yellow card	Red card	Yellow card	Red card	Yellow card	Red card
1	(Azerbaijan)	GK	Rauf Mehdiyev	1	0	1	0	2	0
2	(Azerbaijan)	DF	Rail Malikov	2	0	0	0	2	0
3	(Brazil)	DF	Denis Silva	4	0	1	0	5	0
4	(Algeria)	MF	Yacine Hima	1	0	0	0	1	0
5	(North Macedonia)	DF	Igor Mitreski	3	0	1	0	4	0
6	(North Macedonia)	MF	Slavčo Georgievski	5	0	0	0	5	0
7	(Azerbaijan)	FW	Farid Guliev	1	0	0	0	1	0
7	(Brazil)	MF	Rodriguinho	1	0	0	0	1	0
8	(Azerbaijan)	MF	Elmar Bakhshiev	2	0	0	0	2	0
9	(Brazil)	FW	Flavinho	2	0	0	0	2	0
10	(Belgium)	FW	Émile Mpenza	2	0	0	0	2	0
11	(Azerbaijan)	FW	Javid Huseynov	2	0	0	0	2	0
14	(Uzbekistan)	FW	Bahodir Nasimov	6	0	1	0	7	0
15	(Azerbaijan)	DF	Ruslan Abishov	6	0	0	0	6	0
16	(Brazil)	MF	Alessandro	3	0	0	0	3	0
17	(Azerbaijan)	MF	Araz Abdullayev	2	0	1	0	3	0
18	(Azerbaijan)	DF	Ruslan Amirjanov	1	0	0	0	1	0
19	(Azerbaijan)	MF	Mirhuseyn Seyidov	2	0	0	0	2	0
22	(Azerbaijan)	FW	Ruslan Qurbanov	1	0	0	0	1	0
24	(Lithuania)	GK	Paulius Grybauskas	2	0	0	0	2	0
25	(Azerbaijan)	MF	Javid Imamverdiyev	3	0	0	0	3	0
26	(Azerbaijan)	DF	Tärlän Quliyev	1	0	0	0	1	0
27	(Azerbaijan)	MF	Rashad Abdullayev	4	1	1	0	5	1
28	(Azerbaijan)	FW	Amit Guluzade	1	0	0	0	1	0
			TOTALS	58	1	6	0	64	1

=== Player of the Month ===
Month	Player of the Month	
Month	Player	Club
September	(Uzbekistan) Bahodir Nasimov	Neftchi Baku
October	(Brazil) Flavinho	Neftchi Baku
February	(Brazil) Flavinho	Neftchi Baku
