= 2015–16 Neftchi Baku PFK season =

Neftchi Baku
2015–16 season
- Chairman: Sadyg Sadygov
- Manager: Samir Aliyev (until 15 November); Asgar Abdullayev (15 November - 5 March); Vali Gasimov (caretaker) (from 6 March)
- Stadium: Bakcell Arena
- Premier League: 6th
- Azerbaijan Cup: Runners-up
- Europa League: First qualifying round vs Mladost Podgorica
- Top goalscorer: League: Ruslan Qurbanov (13); All: Ruslan Qurbanov (18)
Home colours	Away colours	Third colours

The Neftchi Baku 2015–16 season is Neftchi Baku's 24th Azerbaijan Premier League season. Neftchi will compete Azerbaijan Premier League and in the 2015–16 Azerbaijan Cup and UEFA Europa League.

== Squad ==
As of 31 January 2016

Note: Flags indicate national team as defined under FIFA eligibility rules; some limited exceptions apply. Players may hold more than one non-FIFA nationality.

No.	Pos.	Nation	Player
1	GK	AZE	Agil Mammadov
3	DF	BRA	Jairo
4	DF	AZE	Rahil Mammadov
5	DF	ESP	Melli
6	DF	BRA	Ailton (loan from Fluminense)
7	MF	AZE	Araz Abdullayev
8	MF	AZE	Elshan Abdullayev
9	FW	CHI	Nicolás Canales
10	MF	AZE	Javid Imamverdiyev
11	FW	AZE	Ruslan Qurbanov
14	FW	AZE	Magomed Kurbanov (loan from Sumgayit)
15	MF	PAR	Éric Ramos

No.	Pos.	Nation	Player
17	MF	AZE	Rahman Hajiyev
18	MF	AZE	Elshan Rzazade
19	FW	AZE	Fahmin Muradbayli
20	FW	ESP	Añete
26	DF	AZE	Kamal Gurbanov
27	DF	AZE	Magsad Isayev
33	DF	AZE	Orkhan Bashirov
45	MF	AZE	Kamran Najafzade
53	GK	AZE	Maksim Vaylo
61	MF	AZE	Tayyar Mämmädov
72	DF	AZE	Bilal Abbaszade
95	DF	AZE	Elvin Badalov

=== Out on loan ===
Note: Flags indicate national team as defined under FIFA eligibility rules; some limited exceptions apply. Players may hold more than one non-FIFA nationality.

No.	Pos.	Nation	Player
22	FW	AZE	Mirabdulla Abbasov (at Daugavpils)
88	MF	AZE	Orkhan Gurbanli (at Daugavpils)
--	GK	AZE	Ruzi Giyasli (at Qaradağ)

No.	Pos.	Nation	Player
--	MF	AZE	Tanrıverdi Maharramli (at Neftchala)
--	FW	AZE	Ilham Allahverdiyev (at Qaradağ)

== Transfers ==
=== Summer ===
In: Note: Flags indicate national team as defined under FIFA eligibility rules; some limited exceptions apply. Players may hold more than one non-FIFA nationality.

No.	Pos.	Nation	Player
3	DF	BRA	Jairo (from (Portugal) Trofense)
5	DF	ESP	Melli (from (Azerbaijan) Simurq)
6	DF	BRA	Ailton (loan from (Brazil) Fluminense)
10	MF	AZE	Javid Imamverdiyev (loan return from (Turkey) Elazığspor)
14	MF	AZE	Magomed Kurbanov (loan from (Azerbaijan) Sumgayit)
20	FW	ESP	Añete (from (Bulgaria) Levski Sofia)
23	FW	AZE	Ruslan Qurbanov (loan return from (Croatia) Hajduk Split)
24	GK	SVK	Michal Peškovič (from (Poland) Podbeskidzie Bielsko-Biała)

Out: Note: Flags indicate national team as defined under FIFA eligibility rules; some limited exceptions apply. Players may hold more than one non-FIFA nationality.

No.	Pos.	Nation	Player
2	DF	BRA	Carlos Cardoso (to (Iran) Tractor Sazi Tabriz)
3	DF	BRA	Denis Silva (to (Azerbaijan) Inter Baku)
5	DF	AZE	Elvin Yunuszade (to (Azerbaijan) Qarabağ)
9	MF	BRA	Flavinho (to (Brazil) Chapecoense)
10	MF	SLE	Julius Wobay
11	FW	CHI	Nicolás Canales (to (Russia) Krylia Sovetov)
12	GK	LAT	Pāvels Doroševs (to (Latvia) Liepāja)
19	MF	AZE	Mirhüseyn Seyidov (to (Azerbaijan) Inter Baku)
22	FW	AZE	Rauf Aliyev (to (Azerbaijan) Inter Baku)
28	MF	AZE	Emin Mehdiyev (loan to (Azerbaijan) Sumgayit)
30	GK	SRB	Saša Stamenković (to (Greece) Kerkyra)
77	MF	AZE	Nijat Gurbanov (to (Azerbaijan) Zira, previously on loan (Azerbaijan) AZAL)
90	FW	CMR	Ernest Webnje Nfor

=== Winter ===
In: Note: Flags indicate national team as defined under FIFA eligibility rules; some limited exceptions apply. Players may hold more than one non-FIFA nationality.

No.	Pos.	Nation	Player
9	FW	CHI	Nicolás Canales (from (Russia) Krylia Sovetov)
18	MF	AZE	Elshan Rzazade (from (Azerbaijan) Khazar Lankaran)
72	DF	AZE	Bilal Abbaszade (from (Azerbaijan) Qarabağ)

Out: Note: Flags indicate national team as defined under FIFA eligibility rules; some limited exceptions apply. Players may hold more than one non-FIFA nationality.

No.	Pos.	Nation	Player
16	DF	AZE	Aziz Guliyev
18	MF	BRA	Cauê (to (Israel) Hapoel Tel Aviv)
21	FW	AZE	Samir Masimov (to (Slovenia) Domžale)
22	FW	AZE	Mirabdulla Abbasov (loan to (Latvia) Daugavpils)
24	GK	SVK	Michal Peškovič
88	MF	AZE	Orkhan Gurbanli (loan to (Latvia) Daugavpils)
—	GK	AZE	Ruzi Giyasli (loan to (Azerbaijan) Qaradağ Lokbatan, previously on loan to (Azerbaijan) Ağsu)

== Friendlies ==
20 June 2015	Neftchi Baku (Azerbaijan)	0 – 3	(Hungary) MTK	Austria
21:00 AZT (UTC+4)		Report

24 June 2015	Neftchi Baku (Azerbaijan)	0 – 2	(Albania) Kukësi	Austria
21:00 AZT (UTC+4)		Report	Moreira; Pejić

27 June 2015	Neftchi Baku (Azerbaijan)	0 – 1	(Ukraine) Shakhtar Donetsk	Austria
AZT (UTC+4)		Report	Bolbat 81'

== Competitions ==
=== Azerbaijan Premier League ===
==== Results summary ====
Overall								Home						Away					
Pld	W	D	L	GF	GA	GD	Pts	W	D	L	GF	GA	GD	W	D	L	GF	GA	GD
36	13	10	13	41	41	0	49	6	6	6	22	20	+2	7	4	7	19	21	−2

Last updated: 20 May 2016.
Source: Soccerway

==== Results ====
9 August 2015 1	Neftchi Baku	0 – 0	Kapaz	Baku
21:00 AZST (UTC+5)	A.Abdullayev (yellow card) 40'; Badalov (yellow card) 49'	Summary	S.Aliyev (yellow card) 42' (yellow-red card) 70'; Juninho (yellow card) 48'; M.Aghakishiyev (yellow card) 90+4'	Stadium: Bakcell Arena; Attendance: 1,500; Referee: Fariz Yusifov

17 August 2015 2	Inter Baku	1 – 0	Neftchi Baku	Baku
21:00 AZST (UTC+5)	Qirtimov (yellow card) 19' (yellow-red card) 80'; Silva 45' (yellow card) 72'; Aliyev (yellow card) 80'; Khizanishvili (yellow card) 87'	Report	Melli (red card) 16'; Ramos (yellow card) 52'; M.Isayev (yellow card) 56'	Stadium: Inter Arena; Attendance: 1,000; Referee: Orkhan Mämmädov

23 August 2015 3	Neftchi Baku	2 – 1	Sumgayit	Baku
18:15 AZST (UTC+5)	A.Abdullayev 51'; R.Hajiyev 53'; Ailton (yellow card) 80'; A.Mammadov (yellow card) 88'	Summary	Fardjad-Azad (yellow card) 45'; N.Gurbanov 78'; J.Hajiyev (yellow card) 90+3'	Stadium: Bakikhanov Stadium; Attendance: 1,500; Referee: Ramil Diniyev

13 September 2015 4	Ravan Baku	1 – 3	Neftchi Baku	Baku
21:00 AZST (UTC+5)	Y.Ağakärimzadä (yellow card) 7'; N.Mukhtarov 70'; Barlay (yellow card) 89'	Summary	Ailton (yellow card) 20' (yellow-red card) 56'; F.Muradbayli 24', 82'; R.Hajiyev 40'; R.Mammadov (yellow card) 53'; Cauê (yellow card) 64'	Stadium: Bayil Stadium; Attendance: 500; Referee: Aliyar Ağayev

20 September 2015 5	Neftchi Baku	1 – 1	Khazar Lankaran	Baku
21:00 AZST (UTC+5)	E.Abdullayev (yellow card) 57'; A.Abdullayev 58'; Cauê (yellow card) 82'; Añete (yellow card) 90+1'	Summary	O.Sadıqlı (yellow card) 4'; Scarlatache (yellow card) 9' (yellow-red card) 56'; Amirguliyev 60'; K.Abdullazadä (yellow card) 69'; E.Jäfärov (yellow card) 81'	Stadium: Bakcell Arena; Attendance: 1,500; Referee: Rahim Häsänov

26 September 2015 6	Qarabağ	1 – 1	Neftchi Baku	Baku
19:00 AZST (UTC+5)	Quintana (yellow card) 70'; Diniyev (yellow card) 89'; Richard 90+1'	Report	Ramos (yellow card) 23' (goal) 61'; Qurbanov (yellow card) 42'; A.Mammadov (yellow card) 73'; S.Masimov (yellow card) 90'; Añete (yellow card) 90+1'	Stadium: Tofiq Bahramov Stadium^{1} Attendance: 4,000; Referee: Fariz Yusifov

3 October 2015 7	Zira	2 – 0	Neftchi Baku	Baku
19:00 AZST (UTC+5)	Ivanović 19' (yellow card) 66'; T.Jahangirov (yellow card) 25'; Tato (yellow card) 34'; Bonilla 71'	Report	Qurbanov (yellow card) 20'; F.Muradbayli (red card) 47'; Ramos (yellow card) 77'; S.Masimov (yellow card) 80'	Stadium: Zira Olympic Sport Complex Stadium; Attendance: 1,300; Referee: Aliyar Ağayev

17 October 2015 8	Neftchi Baku	0 – 1	Gabala	Baku
15:30 AZST (UTC+5)	M.Isayev (yellow card) 86'	Report	E.Jamalov (yellow card) 55'; Zenjov (yellow card) 81'; Antonov (yellow card) 83' (goal) 90'; Gai (yellow card) 85'; Dodô (yellow card) 90+3'	Stadium: Bakikhanov Stadium; Attendance: 600; Referee: Rahim Häsänov

23 October 2015 9	AZAL	2 – 1	Neftchi Baku	Baku
18:00 AZST (UTC+5)	Kvirtia 24' (pen.) (yellow card) 24'; Malikov (yellow card) 26'; T.Novruzov (yellow card) 42'; Guruli 90+4' (pen.)	Report	K.Gurbanov (yellow card) 23'; Ailton (yellow card) 29'; Qurbanov 57'; R.Hajiyev (yellow card) 71'; Jairo (red card) 90+4'	Stadium: AZAL Arena; Attendance: 500; Referee: Ramil Diniyev

27 October 2015 10	Neftchi Baku	1 – 1	Inter Baku	Baku
19:00 AZT (UTC+4)	Qurbanov 35' (pen.); Ramos (yellow card) 39'; A.Mammadov (yellow card) 52'; F.Muradbayli (yellow card) 63'; Ailton (yellow card) 90+1'	Summary	A.Hüseynov (yellow card) 34'; N.Hajiyev 86'; Abatsiyev (yellow card) 90+2'; Salukvadze (yellow card) 90+3'	Stadium: Bakcell Arena; Attendance: 500; Referee: Elvin Äsgärov

2 November 2015 11	Sumgayit	1 – 2	Neftchi Baku	Sumqayit
19:00 AZT (UTC+4)	Pamuk 7'; J.Hajiyev (yellow card) 29'; S.Mahammadaliyev (yellow card) 76'; E.Mehdiyev (yellow card) 78'	Report	Añete (yellow card) 15'; Cauê (yellow card) 38'; Ailton (yellow card) 48'; Qurbanov (yellow card) 60' (goal) 77' (pen.); F.Muradbayli 72'; E.Abdullayev (yellow card) 85'; A.Mammadov (yellow card) 88'	Stadium: Kapital Bank Arena; Attendance: 2,000; Referee: Rauf Cabbarov

8 November 2015 12	Neftchi Baku	2 – 3	Ravan Baku	Baku
18:00 AZT (UTC+4)	Qurbanov (yellow card) 31' (goal) 41', 90'; Peškovič (yellow card) 77'	Summary	N.Mukhtarov 47'; Y.Ağakärimzadä 49'; R.Tagizade 65'; Abbasov (yellow card) 77'; M.Quliyev (yellow card) 84'	Stadium: Bakcell Arena; Attendance: 500; Referee: Omar Paşayev

22 November 2015 13	Khazar Lankaran	0 – 2	Neftchi Baku	Lankaran
18:00 AZT (UTC+4)	K.Abdullazadä (yellow card) 43'; I.Säfärzadä (yellow card) 45+1'	Summary	K.Gurbanov (yellow card) 24'; Ramos (yellow card) 43'; Imamverdiyev (yellow card) 54'; E.Abdullayev 60'; F.Muradbayli 75'	Stadium: Lankaran City Stadium; Attendance: 9,000; Referee: Aliyar Ağayev

29 November 2015 14	Neftchi Baku	1 – 0	Qarabağ	Baku
17:00 AZT (UTC+4)	Ailton (yellow card) 29'; R.Hajiyev 65' (yellow card) 65'; R.Mammadov (yellow card) 67'; K.Gurbanov (yellow card) 90+2'; Kurbanov (yellow card) 90+4'	Summary	Medvedev (yellow card) 33'; Míchel (yellow card) 38'	Stadium: Bakcell Arena; Attendance: 6,500; Referee: Omar Paşayev

6 December 2015 15	Neftchi Baku	1 – 1	Zira	Baku
16:00 AZT (UTC+4)	Qurbanov 10' (yellow card) 40'; Ramos (yellow card) 40'; R.Mammadov (yellow card) 52'; A.Mammadov (yellow card) 80'	Report	Tato 4'; V.Igbekoi (yellow card) 26'; T.Khalilzade (yellow card) 44'; A.Nagiyev (yellow card) 74'	Stadium: Bakcell Arena; Attendance: 900; Referee: Ramil Diniyev

13 December 2015 16	Gabala	0 – 1	Neftchi Baku	Qabala
15:30 AZT (UTC+4)	Dashdemirov (yellow card) 43'; Sadiqov (yellow card) 89'	Report	Jairo 22' (yellow card) 45+2'; Qurbanov (yellow card) 37'; Kurbanov (yellow card) 69'; A.Mammadov	Stadium: Gabala City Stadium; Attendance: 1,000; Referee: Rahim Häsänov

17 December 2015 17	Neftchi Baku	0 – 1	AZAL	Baku
17:00 AZT (UTC+4)	Jairo (yellow card) 61'; Ramos (yellow card) 75'; Añete (yellow card) 90'	Summary	R.Nasirli 29'; M.Sattarly (yellow card) 87'; K.Mirzayev (yellow card) 90+2'	Stadium: Bakcell Arena; Attendance: 1,000; Referee: Aliyar Ağayev

20 December 2015 18	Kapaz	1 – 1	Neftchi Baku	Ganja
14:00 AZT (UTC+4)	Guliyev 15'; B.Nasirov (yellow card) 36'; T.Narimanov (red card) 53'; A.Karimov (yellow card) 90+2'	Summary	Ailton (yellow card) 32' (yellow-red card) 50'; Cauê (yellow card) 35'; Ramos (yellow card) 40'; Imamverdiyev 47' (yellow card) 85'; Qurbanov (yellow card) 51'; A.Mammadov (yellow card) 81'	Stadium: Ganja City Stadium; Attendance: 15,000; Referee: Omar Paşayev

30 January 2015 19	Neftchi Baku	1 – 0	Sumgayit	Baku
16:30 AZT (UTC+4)	Añete (yellow card) 13'; Qurbanov 55'; Hajiyev (yellow card) 57'; K.Gurbanov (yellow card) 70'	Summary	Hüseynov (yellow card) 61'; J.Hajiyev (yellow card) 66'; Ramazanov (yellow card) 79'; Agayev (yellow card) 82'; Chertoganov (yellow card) 84'	Stadium: Bakcell Arena; Attendance: 1,000; Referee: Aliyar Ağayev

5 February 2016 20	Neftchi Baku	1 – 1	Ravan Baku	Baku
16:30 AZT (UTC+4)	Jairo (yellow card) 38' (yellow-red card) 88' (goal) 83'; Imamverdiyev (yellow card) 44'; Qurbanov (yellow card) 51'	Summary	R.Tagizade (yellow card) 16'; N.Mammadov (yellow card) 19'; N.Gurbanov (yellow card) 36'; C.Abdullayev 48'; Khamid (yellow card) 85' (red card) 89'; Yunisoğlu (yellow card) 90+1'; Abbasov (yellow card) 90+5'	Stadium: Bakcell Arena; Attendance: 200; Referee: Elvin Äsgärov

13 February 2016 21	Neftchi Baku	1 – 0	Khazar Lankaran	Baku
17:00 AZT (UTC+4)	K.Gurbanov (yellow card) 24'; Ramos (yellow card) 55'; E.Abdullayev 87' (yellow card) 87'; F.Muradbayli (yellow card) 90'	Report	A.Mirili (yellow card) 75'; V.Gulaliyev (yellow card) 88'	Stadium: Bakcell Arena; Attendance: 2,500; Referee: Rahim Həsənov

20 February 2016 22	Qarabağ	2 – 0	Neftchi Baku	Baku
17:30 AZT (UTC+4)	Armenteros 8'; Richard (yellow card) 60'; Quintana 80'	Summary	F.Muradbayli (yellow card) 22'; Ailton (yellow card) 26'; Ramos (yellow card) 35'; K.Gurbanov (yellow card) 60'	Stadium: Azersun Arena; Attendance: 3,000; Referee: Rauf Jabbarov

27 February 2016 23	Zira	3 – 0	Neftchi Baku	Baku
15:00 AZT (UTC+4)	T.Mutallimov (yellow card) 14'; N.Novruzov (yellow card) 16'; Bonilla 24'; N.Gurbanov (yellow card) 76'; Tato 88', 90+3'; A.Nagiyev (yellow card) 85'	Summary	Imamverdiyev (yellow card) 25' (yellow-red card) 43'; Qurbanov (yellow card) 44'	Stadium: Zira Olympic Sport Complex Stadium; Attendance: 900; Referee: Fariz Yusifov

5 March 2016 24	Neftchi Baku	1 – 2	Gabala	Baku
15:00 AZT (UTC+4)	Añete 26'; A.Mammadov (yellow card) 52'; Jairo (red card) 80'; Qurbanov (yellow card) 80'	Summary	Santos 50' (yellow card) 70'; Antonov (yellow card) 75'; Eyyubov 90'	Stadium: Bakikhanov Stadium; Attendance: 1,000; Referee: Omar Paşayev

13 March 2016 25	AZAL	1 – 1	Neftchi Baku	Baku
15:00 AZT (UTC+4)	K.Mirzayev 41'; Guruli (yellow card) 45+3'	Report	Canales 41'	Stadium: AZAL Arena; Attendance: 300; Referee: Aliyar Ağayev

19 March 2016 26	Neftchi Baku	2 – 3	Kapaz	Baku
18:00 AZT (UTC+4)	A.Abdullayev (yellow card) 43' (goal) 60'; F.Muradbayli (yellow card) 43'; Qurbanov 81' (pen.); E.Abdullayev (yellow card) 89'	Summary	B.Soltanov 31'; T.Akhundov 33' (pen.); B.Nasirov (yellow card) 43'; Ebah (yellow card) 65'; S.Aliyev (yellow card) 80'; Guliyev (yellow card) 83'; S.Rahimov 90+1'; T.Simaitis (yellow card) 90+1'	Stadium: Bakcell Arena; Attendance: 1,700; Referee: Rauf Cabbarov

30 March 2016 27	Inter Baku	0 – 1	Neftchi Baku	Baku
18:00 AZT (UTC+4)	Khizanishvili (yellow card) 10'; Seyidov (yellow card) 19'; E.Abdullayev (yellow card) 81'; Denis (yellow card) 85'	Summary	Qurbanov 50' (pen.); K.Gurbanov (yellow card) 79'	Stadium: Inter Arena; Attendance: 350; Referee: Aliyar Ağayev

3 April 2016 28	Ravan Baku	1 – 0	Neftchi Baku	Baku
17:00 AZT (UTC+4)	E.Hasanaliyev 3'; Abbasov (yellow card) 81'	Summary	K.Gurbanov (yellow card) 24'; Ailton (yellow card) 41'; Qurbanov (yellow card) 78'	Stadium: Bayil Stadium; Attendance: 200; Referee: Omar Paşayev

10 April 2016 29	Khazar Lankaran	0 – 1	Neftchi Baku	Lankaran
16:30 AZT (UTC+4)	Mammadov (yellow card) 54'	Summary	Qurbanov 40'; M.Isayev (yellow card) 64'	Stadium: Lankaran City Stadium; Attendance: 3,500; Referee: Aliyar Ağayev

16 April 2016 30	Neftchi Baku	1 – 2	Qarabağ	Baku
16:00 AZT (UTC+4)	Qurbanov (yellow card) 23'; Ailton (yellow card) 46' (goal) 74'; A.Mammadov (yellow card) 56'; Ramos (yellow card) 67'; Badalov (yellow card) 70'; Jairo (yellow card) 76'	Report	Quintana (yellow card) 45' (goal) 56'; Richard (yellow card) 56'; Reynaldo 73'	Stadium: Bakcell Arena; Attendance: 6,500; Referee: Ramil Diniyev

23 April 2016 31	Neftchi Baku	0 – 0	Zira	Baku
19:00 AZT (UTC+4)	K.Gurbanov (yellow card) 47'; Canales (yellow card) 62'	Summary	Krneta (yellow card) 62'; Bonilla (yellow card) 67'	Stadium: Bakcell Arena; Attendance: 1,000; Referee: Fariz Yusifov

1 May 2016 32	Gabala	2 – 2	Neftchi Baku	Qabala
16:30 AZT (UTC+4)	Gai 21' (pen.); Sadiqov 51'; Mirzabekov (yellow card) 87'; Zec (yellow card) 90'	Report	R.Mammadov (yellow card) 10'; Kurbanov (yellow card) 16'; Qurbanov 32'; E.Abdullayev 64'	Stadium: Gabala City Stadium; Attendance: 1,500; Referee: Rauf Jabbarov

7 May 2016 33	Neftchi Baku	3 – 1	AZAL	Masazır
19:05 AZT (UTC+4)	Añete 16'; A.Abdullayev 24'; Ailton 44'; Ramos (yellow card) 56'; Kurbanov (yellow card) 90+3'	Summary	Jafarguliyev (yellow card) 47'; Kvirtia 49'	Stadium: Alinja Arena; Attendance: 700; Referee: Rahim Həsənov

11 May 2016 34	Kapaz	1 – 2	Neftchi Baku	Ganja
16:00 AZT (UTC+4)	Ebah 5'; T.Akhundov (yellow card) 38'; B.Nasirov (yellow card) 68'; S.Rahimov (yellow card) 79'; Guliyev (yellow card) 88' (yellow-red card) 90'	Summary	Jairo (yellow card) 41'; Añete 49'; Qurbanov 80' (pen.); E.Abdullayev (yellow card) 90+2'	Stadium: Ganja City Stadium; Attendance: 12,000; Referee: Fariz Yusifov

15 May 2016 35	Neftchi Baku	4 – 2	Inter Baku	Masazır
18:00 AZT (UTC+4)	Qurbanov 27'; A.Abdullayev 33'; E.Abdullayev 51'; Ailton (yellow card) 80' (goal) 84'	Summary	M.Abbasov 6', 90+2'; Salukvadze (yellow card) 22'; Lomaia (yellow card) 23'; Meza (yellow card) 41'	Stadium: Alinja Arena; Attendance: 500; Referee: Ramil Diniyev

20 May 2016 36	Sumgayit	2 – 1	Neftchi Baku	Sumqayit
19:00 AZT (UTC+4)	Javadov 18'; Ramaldanov (yellow card) 56'; A.Yunanov 64'; Ramazanov (yellow card) 71'; N.Mukhtarov (yellow card) 72'; Agayev (yellow card) 76'; Aghayev (yellow card) 82'	Summary	Añete (yellow card) 9'; A.Abdullayev 14'; R.Mammadov (yellow card) 43'; Jairo (yellow card) 62'	Stadium: Kapital Bank Arena; Attendance: 1,350; Referee: Rauf Jabbarov

==== League table ====
Pos	Team	Pld	W	D	L	GF	GA	GD	Pts	Qualification or relegation
4	Inter Baku (Note: On 31 March 2016, the Adjudicatory Chamber of the UEFA Club Financial Control Body (CFCB) announced that Inter Baku will be excluded from participating in the next UEFA club competition for which they would otherwise qualify in the next three seasons (i.e. the 2016/17, 2017/18 and 2018/19 seasons).)	36	16	11	9	39	28	+11	59 (Note: Gabala ahead of Inter Baku on head-to-head record: Inter Baku–Gabala 2–1, Gabala–Inter Baku 1–1, Inter Baku–Gabala 0–1, Gabala–Inter Baku 0–0.)	
5	Kapaz	36	15	11	10	48	40	+8	56	Qualification for the Europa League first qualifying round
6	Neftçi Baku	36	13	10	13	41	41	0	49	Qualification for the Europa League first qualifying round
7	AZAL	36	13	7	16	26	38	−12	46	
8	Sumgayit	36	9	12	15	41	49	−8	39	

Source: PFL, UEFA, Soccerway
Rules for classification: 1) Points; 2) Head-to-head points; 3) Head-to-head goal difference; 4) Head-to-head goals scored; 5) Head-to-head away goals scored (only if two teams); 6) Goal difference; 7) Goals scored.

=== Azerbaijan Cup ===
2 December 2015 Second round	Neftchi Baku	8 – 0	Qaradağ Lökbatan	Baku
18:00 AZT (UTC+4)	Cauê 5'; R.Hajiyev 19'; E.Abdullayev 32', 62' (yellow card) 67'; Qurbanov 34', 52'; Imamverdiyev 36'; Ailton (yellow card) 48'; A.Guliyev (yellow card) 72'; Kurbanov 83'	Summary	V.İsmayılov (yellow card) 41'; E.Mustafayev (yellow card) 65'; R.Nuriyev (yellow card) 66'	Stadium: Bakcell Arena; Attendance: 1,000; Referee: Rauf Jabbarov

2 March 2016 Quarterfinal 1st leg	Khazar Lankaran	3 – 2	Neftchi Baku	Lankaran
14:00 AZT (UTC+4)	V.Gulaliyev 18'; T.Gurbatov 19'; V.Baybalayev (yellow card) 37'; I.Gadirzade 52'; B.Budagov (yellow card) 90+3'	Summary	Qurbanov 22'; F.Muradbayli 39'; Ramos (yellow card) 43'; Badalov (yellow card) 60'; A.Mammadov	Stadium: Lankaran City Stadium; Attendance: 4,500; Referee: Aliyar Ağayev

9 March 2016 Quarterfinal 2nd leg	Neftchi Baku	2 – 0 (4 – 3 agg.)	Khazar Lankaran	Baku
17:30 AZT (UTC+4)	Ramos (yellow card) 29'; Qurbanov 60' (pen.); A.Abdullayev 64' (yellow card) 87'	Summary	V.Baybalayev (yellow card) 40'; V.Gulaliyev (yellow card) 49'; Mammadov (yellow card) 59'	Stadium: Bakcell Arena; Attendance: 2,500; Referee: Rahim Həsənov

27 April 2016 Semifinal 1st leg	Neftchi Baku	1 – 1	Gabala	Baku
19:00 AZT (UTC+4)	Jairo (yellow card) 33'; Hajiyev 71'; F.Muradbayli (yellow card) 86'	Summary	Gai 5' (yellow card) 74'; Abbasov (yellow card) 41'; Sadiqov (yellow card) 54' (yellow-red card) 84'	Stadium: Bakcell Arena; Attendance: 3,000; Referee: Aliyar Ağayev

4 May 2016 Semifinal 2nd leg	Gabala	1 – 1 (a.e.t.) (2 – 2 agg.) (3–4 p)	Neftchi Baku	Qabala
16:00 AZT (UTC+4)	A.Mammadov (yellow card) 20'; E.Jamalov (yellow card) 44'; S.Zargarov (yellow card) 61'; Zec 76' (yellow card) 120'	Summary	Qurbanov 59'; Ramos (yellow card) 61'; Ailton (yellow card) 68'	Stadium: Gabala City Stadium; Attendance: 4,200; Referee: Fariz Yusifov
	Penalties
	Gai (penalty scored); Antonov (penalty scored); Zec (penalty scored); Vernydub (penalty missed); S.Zargarov (penalty missed)		Ramos (penalty scored); Jairo (penalty scored); A.Abdullayev (penalty scored); Añete (penalty missed); R.Qurbanov (penalty scored)

==== Final ====
25 May 2016	Qarabağ	1 – 0 (a.e.t.)	Neftchi Baku	Baku
20:00 AZT (UTC+4)	Quintana (yellow card) 92'; Míchel (yellow card) 117' (goal) 120'; Reynaldo (red card) 120+1'	Summary	Qurbanov (yellow card) 92'; Ramos (yellow card) 117' (red card) 120'; A.Mammadov (yellow card) 117'	Stadium: Tofiq Bahramov Stadium; Attendance: 23,000; Referee: Fariz Yusifov

=== UEFA Europa League ===
==== Qualifying rounds ====
2 July 2015 First qualifying round 1st leg	Neftchi Baku (Azerbaijan)	2 – 2	(Montenegro) Mladost Podgorica	Baku, Azerbaijan
21:00 AZST (UTC+5)	K.Gurbanov (yellow card) 33' (goal) 36'; A.Abdullayev 55'	Report	Lagator 34'; Raičević (yellow card) 47'; M.M.Radulović (yellow card) 68'; M.B.Radulović (yellow card) 77'; Mirković 87'	Stadium: Bakcell Arena; Attendance: 9,866; Referee: Ali Palabiyik (Turkey)

9 July 2015 First qualifying round 2nd leg	Mladost Podgorica (Montenegro)	1 – 1 ((a)3 – 3 agg.)	(Azerbaijan) Neftchi Baku	Podgorica, Montenegro
23:30 AZST (UTC+5)	Pejović (yellow card) 45'; Vuković 90+1'; Muhović (yellow card) 90+5'; M.M.Radulović (yellow card) 79' (red card) 90+9'	Report	R.Hajiyev (yellow card) 6'; Cauê (yellow card) 15'; Ailton (yellow card) 58' (red card) 90+9'; A.Abdullayev 71'; N.Gurbanov (yellow card) 84'; M.Vaylo (red card) 90+9'	Stadium: Stadion pod Goricom (Note: Mladost Podgorica play their home matches at Stadion pod Goricom, Podgorica, instead of their regular Stadion FK Mladost, Podgorica.); Attendance: 4,000; Referee: Kevin Clancy (Scotland)

== Squad statistics ==
As of Match played 25 May 2016

=== Appearances and goals ===
No.	Pos	Nat	Player	Total		Premier League		Azerbaijan Cup		Europa League	
No.	Pos	Nat	Player	Apps	Goals	Apps	Goals	Apps	Goals	Apps	Goals
1	GK	(Azerbaijan) AZE	Agil Mammadov	34	0	28	0	4	0	2	0
3	DF	(Brazil) BRA	Jairo	25	2	20	2	5	0	0	0
4	DF	(Azerbaijan) AZE	Rahil Mammadov	23	0	18+1	0	3+1	0	0	0
5	DF	(Spain) ESP	Melli	31	0	24+2	0	2+1	0	2	0
6	DF	(Brazil) BRA	Ailton	39	3	30+2	3	4+1	0	2	0
7	MF	(Azerbaijan) AZE	Araz Abdullayev	34	9	21+5	6	4+2	1	2	2
8	MF	(Azerbaijan) AZE	Elshan Abdullayev	40	6	19+13	4	5+1	2	1+1	0
9	FW	(Chile) CHI	Nicolás Canales	9	1	3+4	1	0+2	0	0	0
10	MF	(Azerbaijan) AZE	Javid Imamverdiyev	27	2	13+10	1	3+1	1	0	0
11	FW	(Azerbaijan) AZE	Ruslan Qurbanov	39	18	28+3	13	6	5	2	0
14	FW	(Azerbaijan) AZE	Magomed Kurbanov	17	1	4+9	0	0+2	1	2	0
15	MF	(Paraguay) PAR	Éric Ramos	36	1	31	1	5	0	0	0
17	MF	(Azerbaijan) AZE	Rahman Hajiyev	42	5	29+5	3	5+1	2	2	0
18	MF	(Azerbaijan) AZE	Elshan Rzazade	2	0	0+2	0	0	0	0	0
19	FW	(Azerbaijan) AZE	Fahmin Muradbayli	36	5	23+8	4	3+2	1	0	0
20	FW	(Spain) ESP	Añete	30	3	23+3	3	2+2	0	0	0
26	DF	(Azerbaijan) AZE	Kamal Gurbanov	30	1	19+4	0	4+1	0	2	1
27	DF	(Azerbaijan) AZE	Magsad Isayev	25	0	20+2	0	3	0	0	0
41	MF	(Azerbaijan) AZE	Agshin Gurbanli	1	0	0+1	0	0	0	0	0
45	MF	(Azerbaijan) AZE	Kamran Najafzade	1	0	0	0	0	0	0+1	0
53	GK	(Azerbaijan) AZE	Maksim Vaylo	7	0	6	0	1	0	0	0
61	MF	(Azerbaijan) AZE	Tayyar Mämmädov	2	0	0+2	0	0	0	0	0
77	MF	(Azerbaijan) AZE	Nijat Gurbanov	2	0	0	0	0	0	0+2	0
95	DF	(Azerbaijan) AZE	Elvin Badalov	26	0	18+1	0	5	0	2	0
Players away from Neftchi Baku on loan:
22	FW	(Azerbaijan) AZE	Mirabdulla Abbasov	3	0	0+2	0	0	0	0+1	0
Players who appeared for Neftchi Baku no longer at the club:
16	DF	(Azerbaijan) AZE	Aziz Guliyev	3	0	1+1	0	0+1	0	0	0
18	MF	(Brazil) BRA	Cauê	20	1	13+5	0	1	1	1	0
21	FW	(Azerbaijan) AZE	Samir Masimov	12	0	4+6	0	0	0	2	0
24	GK	(Slovakia) SVK	Michal Peškovič	3	0	2	0	1	0	0	0

=== Goal scorers ===
Place	Position	Nation	Number	Name	Premier League	Azerbaijan Cup	Europa League	Total
1	FW	(Azerbaijan)	11	Ruslan Qurbanov	13	5	0	18
2	MF	(Azerbaijan)	7	Araz Abdullayev	6	1	2	9
3	MF	(Azerbaijan)	8	Elshan Abdullayev	4	2	1	7
4	FW	(Azerbaijan)	19	Fahmin Muradbayli	4	1	0	5
4	MF	(Azerbaijan)	17	Rahman Hajiyev	3	2	0	5
6	FW	(Spain)	20	Añete	3	0	0	3
6	DF	(Brazil)	6	Ailton	3	0	0	3
8	DF	(Brazil)	3	Jairo	2	0	0	2
8	MF	(Azerbaijan)	10	Javid Imamverdiyev	1	1	0	2
10	MF	(Paraguay)	15	Éric Ramos	1	0	0	1
10	FW	(Chile)	9	Nicolás Canales	1	0	0	1
10	MF	(Brazil)	18	Cauê	0	1	0	1
10	FW	(Azerbaijan)	14	Magomed Kurbanov	0	1	0	1
10	DF	(Azerbaijan)	26	Kamal Gurbanov	0	0	1	1
				TOTALS	41	14	3	58

=== Disciplinary record ===
Number	Nation	Position	Name	Premier League		Azerbaijan Cup		Europa League		Total	
Number	Nation	Position	Name	Yellow card	Red card	Yellow card	Red card	Yellow card	Red card	Yellow card	Red card
1	(Azerbaijan)	GK	Agil Mammadov	9	0	2	0	0	0	11	0
3	(Brazil)	DF	Jairo	7	3	1	0	0	0	8	3
4	(Azerbaijan)	DF	Rahil Mammadov	5	0	0	0	0	0	5	0
5	(Spain)	DF	Melli	0	1	0	0	0	0	0	1
6	(Brazil)	DF	Ailton	13	2	2	0	1	1	15	3
7	(Azerbaijan)	MF	Araz Abdullayev	2	0	1	0	0	0	3	0
8	(Azerbaijan)	MF	Elshan Abdullayev	5	0	1	0	0	0	6	0
9	(Chile)	FW	Nicolás Canales	1	0	0	0	0	0	1	0
10	(Azerbaijan)	MF	Javid Imamverdiyev	5	1	0	0	0	0	5	1
11	(Azerbaijan)	FW	Ruslan Qurbanov	12	0	1	0	0	0	13	0
14	(Azerbaijan)	FW	Magomed Kurbanov	4	0	0	0	0	0	4	0
15	(Paraguay)	MF	Éric Ramos	12	0	4	1	0	0	16	1
16	(Azerbaijan)	DF	Aziz Guliyev	0	0	1	0	0	0	1	0
17	(Azerbaijan)	MF	Rahman Hajiyev	3	0	0	0	1	0	4	0
18	(Brazil)	MF	Cauê	4	0	0	0	1	0	5	0
19	(Azerbaijan)	FW	Fahmin Muradbayli	4	1	1	0	0	0	5	1
20	(Spain)	FW	Añete	6	0	0	0	0	0	6	0
21	(Azerbaijan)	FW	Samir Masimov	2	0	0	0	0	0	2	0
24	(Slovakia)	GK	Michal Peškovič	1	0	0	0	1	0	2	0
26	(Azerbaijan)	DF	Kamal Gurbanov	9	0	0	0	1	0	10	0
27	(Azerbaijan)	DF	Magsad Isayev	3	0	0	0	0	0	3	0
53	(Azerbaijan)	GK	Maksim Vaylo	0	0	0	0	0	1	0	1
77	(Azerbaijan)	MF	Nijat Gurbanov	0	0	0	0	1	0	1	0
95	(Azerbaijan)	DF	Elvin Badalov	2	0	1	0	0	0	3	0
			TOTALS	109	8	15	1	5	2	129	11

== Notes ==
- Qarabağ have played their home games at the Tofiq Bahramov Stadium since 1993 due to the ongoing situation in Quzanlı.
