= 2015–16 Azerbaijan Cup =

Tournament details
- Country: Azerbaijan
- Teams: 19

Final positions
- Champions: Qarabağ
- Runners-up: Neftchi Baku

Tournament statistics
- Matches played: 24
- Goals scored: 79 (3.29 per match)
- Top goal scorer: Ruslan Qurbanov(5 goals)

The 2015–16 Azerbaijan Cup is the 24th season of the annual cup competition in Azerbaijan. The final is set to be played on 25 May 2016.

== First round ==
The First Round games were drawn on 8 October 2015.

14 October 2015 Match 1	MOIK Baku (2)	1–2 (a.e.t.)	Turan Tovuz (2)	Baku
14:00 AZST (UTC+5)	F.Quliyev (yellow card) 24'; B.Kärimov (yellow card) 35'; R.Qevami 63'; S.Camalov (yellow card) 87'; A.Häbibov (yellow card) 111'	Summary	Emrahov (yellow card) 23' (yellow-red card) 50'; Garaev 54' (yellow card) 71'; A.Tağıyev (yellow card) 57'; T.Alhüseynli 112'	Stadium: Inter Arena (IV); Attendance: 100; Referee: Amrah İbrahimov

14 October 2015 Match 2	Shahdag (2)	1–3	Shamkir (2)	Qusar
14:00 AZST (UTC+5)	I.Semedov 89'; K.Ağakərimov (yellow card) 90+3'	Summary	B.Teymurov 34'; A.Huseynov 68'; S.Şıxqayıbov 87' (o.g.)	Stadium: Shovkat Ordukhanov Stadium; Referee: Omar Paşayev

14 October 2015 Match 3	Sharurspor (2)	3–3 (a.e.t.) (4–5 p)	Qaradağ Lökbatan (2)	Baku
20:00 AZST (UTC+5)	R.Musayev 22', 86' (yellow card) 117'; F.Najafov 105+1'	Summary	S.Allahquliyev 9', 58'; E.Mustafayev (yellow card) 74'; R.Musayev 100' (o.g.); E.Məmmədov (yellow card) 117'	Stadium: Bayil Stadium; Attendance: 100; Referee: Anar Niyazov
	Penalties
	Penalty scored Penalty missed		Penalty scored

== Second round ==
The three winners of the First Round will progress to the Second Round, which was also drawn on 8 October 2015.

3 December 2015 Match 4	Ravan Baku (1)	1–0	Baku (2)	Baku
20:00 AZT (UTC+4)	V.Baybalayev 23'; Suma (yellow card) 75'	Summary		Stadium: Bayil Stadium; Attendance: 100; Referee: Aliyar Ağayev

2 December 2015 Match 5	Turan Tovuz (2)	1–3	Inter Baku (1)	Tovuz
14:00 AZT (UTC+4)	A.Mammadov 15'; A.Qädiri (yellow card) 30'; Garaev (yellow card) 39'; E.Alışanlı (yellow card) 90+3'	Summary	S.Bağırov 5' (o.g.); F.Bayramov (yellow card) 17'; L.Kasradze 24'; A.Huseynov 27'; Juanfran (yellow card) 63'	Stadium: Tovuz City Stadium; Attendance: 500; Referee: İnqilab Mämmädov

2 December 2015 Match 6	Qarabağ (1)	2–0	Shamkir (2)	Baku
18:00 AZT (UTC+4)	Taghiyev 72'; Armenteros 83'	Summary	E.Şiriyev (yellow card) 74'	Stadium: Tofiq Bahramov Stadium^{1} Attendance: 500; Referee: Ravan Hamzazade

2 December 2015 Match 7	Neftchala (2)	0–1	Sumgayit (1)	Neftçala
14:00 AZT (UTC+4)	D.Janelidze (yellow card) 74'; F.Äliyev (yellow card) 77'	Summary	Mammadov (yellow card) 25'; M.Rahimov (yellow card) 58'; Chertoganov (yellow card) 60'; Fardjad-Azad 90'	Stadium: Nariman Narimanov Stadium; Attendance: 400; Referee: Ramil Diniyev

2 December 2015 Match 8	Khazar Lankaran (1)	1–0	Kapaz (1)	Lankaran
17:00 AZT (UTC+4)	K.Abdullazadä 14' (yellow card) 90+1'; Amirguliyev (yellow card) 42'; Rzazade (yellow card) 84'; O.Sadıqlı (yellow card) 87'; Jalilov (yellow card) 90+5'	Summary	T.Akhundov (yellow card) 76'	Stadium: Lankaran City Stadium; Attendance: 3,500; Referee: Elvin Asgarov

2 December 2015 Match 9	Neftchi Baku (1)	8–0	Qaradağ Lökbatan (2)	Baku
18:00 AZT (UTC+4)	Cauê 5'; Hajiyev 19'; E.Abdullayev 32', 62' (yellow card) 67'; Qurbanov 34', 52'; Imamverdiyev 36'; Ailton (yellow card) 48'; A.Guliyev (yellow card) 72'; Kurbanov 83'	Summary	V.İsmayılov (yellow card) 41'; E.Mustafayev (yellow card) 65'; R.Nuriyev (yellow card) 66'	Stadium: Bakcell Arena; Attendance: 1,000; Referee: Rauf Jabbarov

2 December 2015 Match 10	AZAL (1)	1–2	Zira (1)	Baku
15:00 AZT (UTC+4)	T.Novruzov (yellow card) 17'; Jafarguliyev (red card) 60'; Guruli 90+2'	Summary	Bonilla 30', 87'; Mbah (yellow card) 50'	Stadium: AZAL Arena; Attendance: 300; Referee: Fariz Yusifov

3 December 2015 Match 11	Gabala (1)	7–0	Mil-Muğan (2)	Qabala
17:00 AZT (UTC+4)	D.Meza 6'; S.Zargarov 16'; Pereyra 22'; G.Aliyev (yellow card) 25' (yellow-red card) 68'; Ricardinho 42'; Zec 44'; Javadov 58'; A.Mammadov 83'	Summary		Stadium: Gabala City Stadium; Attendance: 300; Referee: Orkhan Mämmädov

== Quarterfinals ==
The eight winners from the Second Round are drawn into four two-legged ties.

2 March 2016 Match 12 1st leg	Ravan Baku (1)	2–1	Inter Baku (1)	Baku
19:00 AZT (UTC+4)	R.Tagizade (yellow card) 16'; M.Hashimli (yellow card) 43'; N.Gurbanov 61' (yellow card) 90'; Abbasov 81'	Summary	Denis (yellow card) 7'; C.Meza (yellow card) 22' (goal) 56'; A.Huseynov (yellow card) 70'; Nadirov (yellow card) 80'	Stadium: Bayil Stadium; Attendance: 200; Referee: Ramil Diniyev

9 March 2016 Match 12 2nd leg	Inter Baku (1)	3–0 (4–2 agg.)	Ravan Baku (1)	Baku
14:00 AZT (UTC+4)	Kvekveskiri 31'; C.Meza (yellow card) 63' (goal) 65'; Nadirov 85'	Summary	Y.Ağakarimzada (yellow card) 10'; R.Azizli (yellow card) 30'; Khamid (yellow card) 71'; K.Muslumov (yellow card) 76'	Stadium: Inter Arena; Attendance: 400; Referee: Ramil Diniyev

2 March 2016 Match 13 1st leg	Qarabağ (1)	2–0	Sumgayit (1)	Baku
17:00 AZT (UTC+4)	Garayev (yellow card) 45'; Richard 52' (pen.); M.Madatov 86'	Summary	E.Mehdiyev (yellow card) 12'	Stadium: Azersun Arena^{1} Attendance: 700; Referee: Orkhan Mammadov

9 March 2016 Match 13 2nd leg	Sumgayit (1)	1–4 (1–6 agg.)	Qarabağ (1)	Sumqayit
15:00 AZT (UTC+4)	K.Najafov 63'; B.Hasanalizade (yellow card) 84'	Summary	Muarem 6', 50'; Armenteros 10', 58'; Quintana (yellow card) 65'	Stadium: Kapital Bank Arena; Attendance: 1,000; Referee: Omar Paşayev

2 March 2016 Match 14 1st leg	Khazar Lankaran (1)	3–2	Neftchi Baku (1)	Lankaran
14:00 AZT (UTC+4)	V.Gulaliyev 18'; T.Gurbatov 19'; V.Baybalayev (yellow card) 37'; I.Gadirzade 52'; B.Budagov (yellow card) 90+3'	Summary	Qurbanov 22'; F.Muradbayli 39'; Ramos (yellow card) 43'; E.Badalov (yellow card) 60'; A.Mammadov (yellow card) 90+3'	Stadium: Lankaran City Stadium; Attendance: 4,500; Referee: Aliyar Aghayev

9 March 2016 Match 14 2nd leg	Neftchi Baku (1)	2–0 (4–3 agg.)	Khazar Lankaran (1)	Baku
17:30 AZT (UTC+4)	Ramos (yellow card) 29'; Qurbanov 60' (pen.); A.Abdullayev 64' (yellow card) 87'	Summary	V.Baybalayev (yellow card) 40'; V.Gulaliyev (yellow card) 49'; Mammadov (yellow card) 59'	Stadium: Bakcell Arena; Attendance: 2,500; Referee: Rahim Həsənov

2 March 2016 Match 15 1st leg	Zira (1)	1–2	Gabala (1)	Baku
18:00 AZT (UTC+4)	Bonilla 77'; V.Mustafayev (yellow card) 84'	Summary	Zenjov (yellow card) 32'; Gai 75'; Dodô 83'	Stadium: Zira Olympic Sport Complex Stadium; Attendance: 630; Referee: Rahim Hasanov

9 March 2016 Match 15 2nd leg	Gabala (1)	5–1 (7–2 agg.)	Zira (1)	Qabala
15:00 AZT (UTC+4)	Gai 5', 12'; Sadiqov 17'; Eyyubov 65'; Zec 79'	Summary	N.Novruzov 36'	Stadium: Gabala City Stadium; Attendance: 2,000; Referee: Rauf Jabbarov

== Semifinals ==
The four winners from the Quarterfinals were drawn into two two-legged ties.

27 April 2016 Match 16 1st leg	Inter Baku (1)	0–4	Qarabağ (1)	Baku
17:00 AZST (UTC+5)	Seyidov (yellow card) 36'	Summary	Míchel 19', 61'; Quintana 67'; Reynaldo 85'	Stadium: Inter Arena; Attendance: 2,316; Referee: Rahim Hasanov

4 May 2016 Match 16 2nd leg	Qarabağ (1)	1–0 (5–0 agg.)	Inter Baku (1)	Masazır
AZST (UTC+5)	Míchel 23'; Richard (yellow card) 79'; E.Yagublu (yellow card) 87'	Summary	Fomenko (yellow card) 64'	Stadium: Masazir Stadium; Attendance: 2,800; Referee: Ramil Diniyev

27 April 2016 Match 17 1st leg	Neftchi Baku (1)	1–1	Gabala (1)	Baku
20:00 AZST (UTC+5)	Jairo (yellow card) 33'; Hajiyev 71'; F.Muradbayli (yellow card) 86'	Summary	Gai 5' (yellow card) 74'; Abbasov (yellow card) 41'; Sadiqov (yellow card) 54' (yellow-red card) 84'	Stadium: Bakcell Arena; Attendance: 3,000; Referee: Aliyar Aghayev

4 May 2016 Match 17 2nd leg	Gabala (1)	1–1 (a.e.t.) (2–2 agg.) (3–4 p)	Neftchi Baku (1)	Qabala
17:00 AZST (UTC+5)	A.Mammadov (yellow card) 20'; E.Jamalov (yellow card) 44'; S.Zargarov (yellow card) 61'; Zec 76' (yellow card) 120'	Summary	R.Qurbanov 59'; Ramos (yellow card) 61'; Ailton (yellow card) 68'	Stadium: Gabala City Stadium; Attendance: 4,200; Referee: Fariz Yusifov
	Penalties
	Gai (penalty scored); Antonov (penalty scored); Zec (penalty scored); Vernydub (penalty missed); S.Zargarov (penalty missed)		Ramos (penalty scored); Jairo (penalty scored); A.Abdullayev (penalty scored); Añete (penalty missed); R.Qurbanov (penalty scored)

== Final ==
25 May 2016
21:00 AZST (UTC+5)

Qarabağ (1)	1–0 (a.e.t.)	(1) Neftchi Baku
Quintana (yellow card) 92'; Míchel (yellow card) 117' (goal) 120'; Reynaldo (red card) 120+1'	Summary	Qurbanov (yellow card) 92'; Ramos (yellow card) 117' (red card) 120'; A.Mammadov (yellow card) 117'

Tofiq Bahramov Stadium, Baku
Attendance: 23,000
Referee: Fariz Yusifov

Qarabağ	Neftchi Baku

GK	13	(Bosnia and Herzegovina) Ibrahim Šehić
DF	5	(Azerbaijan) Maksim Medvedev
DF	14	(Azerbaijan) Rashad Sadygov
DF	25	(Albania) Ansi Agolli
DF	55	(Azerbaijan) Badavi Guseynov
MF	2	(Azerbaijan) Gara Garayev		(substituted off) 112'
MF	8	(Spain) Míchel	(yellow card) 117'
MF	10	(Spain) Dani Quintana	(yellow card) 92'
MF	20	(Brazil) Richard Almeida		(substituted off) 110'
FW	9	(Brazil) Reynaldo	(red card) 120+1'
FW	97	(Azerbaijan) Mahir Madatov		(substituted off) 77'
Substitutes:
GK	1	(Azerbaijan) Farhad Valiyev
MF	18	(Azerbaijan) Ilgar Gurbanov
MF	22	(Azerbaijan) Afran Ismayilov		(substituted on) 112'
DF	32	(Azerbaijan) Elvin Yunuszade
MF	67	(Morocco) Alharbi El Jadeyaoui
MF	91	(Azerbaijan) Joshgun Diniyev		(substituted on) 110'
MF	99	(North Macedonia) Muarem Muarem		(substituted on) 77'
Manager:
(Azerbaijan) Gurban Gurbanov

GK	1	(Azerbaijan) Agil Mammadov	(yellow card) 117'
DF	95	(Azerbaijan) Elvin Badalov
DF	3	(Brazil) Jairo
DF	4	(Azerbaijan) Rahil Mammadov
DF	27	(Azerbaijan) Magsad Isayev		(substituted off) 115'
DF	26	(Azerbaijan) Kamal Gurbanov
MF	15	(Paraguay) Éric Ramos	(yellow card) 117' (red card) 120'
MF	17	(Azerbaijan) Rahman Hajiyev
MF	8	(Azerbaijan) Elshan Abdullayev		(substituted off) 111'
MF	7	(Azerbaijan) Araz Abdullayev		(substituted off) 84'
FW	11	(Azerbaijan) Ruslan Qurbanov	(yellow card) 92'
Substitutes:
GK	53	(Azerbaijan) Maksim Vaylo
DF	5	(Spain) Melli		(substituted on) 115'
MF	9	(Chile) Nicolás Canales		(substituted on) 84'
MF	10	(Azerbaijan) Javid Imamverdiyev
MF	19	(Azerbaijan) Fahmin Muradbayli		(substituted on) 111'
FW	20	(Spain) Añete
MF	41	(Azerbaijan) Agshin Gurbanli
Manager:
(Azerbaijan) Vali Gasimov

== Scorers ==
5 goals:

- (Azerbaijan) Ruslan Qurbanov - Neftchi Baku

4 goals:

- (Ukraine) Oleksiy Gai - Gabala
- (Spain) Míchel - Qarabağ

3 goals:

- (Bosnia and Herzegovina) Ermin Zec - Gabala
- (Sweden) Samuel Armenteros - Qarabağ
- (El Salvador) Nelson Bonilla - Zira

2 goals:

- (Paraguay) César Meza - Inter Baku
- (Azerbaijan) Elshan Abdullayev - Neftchi Baku
- (Azerbaijan) Rahman Hajiyev - Neftchi Baku
- (North Macedonia) Muarem Muarem - Qarabağ
- (Azerbaijan) Sabir Allahquliyev - Qaradağ Lökbatan
- (Azerbaijan) Rahman Musayev - Şərurspor

1 goals:

- (Georgia (country)) Aleksandre Guruli - AZAL
- (Argentina) Facundo Pereyra - Gabala
- (Azerbaijan) Rashad Eyyubov - Gabala
- (Azerbaijan) Vagif Javadov - Gabala
- (Azerbaijan) Asif Mammadov - Gabala
- (Azerbaijan) Rashad Sadiqov - Gabala
- (Azerbaijan) Samir Zargarov - Gabala
- (Brazil) Dodô - Gabala
- (Brazil) Ricardinho - Gabala
- (Paraguay) David Meza - Gabala
- (Azerbaijan) Abbas Huseynov - Inter Baku
- (Azerbaijan) Vüqar Nadirov - Inter Baku
- (Georgia (country)) Lasha Kasradze - Inter Baku
- (Georgia (country)) Nika Kvekveskiri - Inter Baku
- (Azerbaijan) Kamran Abdullazadä - Khazar Lankaran
- (Azerbaijan) Ibrahim Gadirzade - Khazar Lankaran
- (Azerbaijan) Vaguf Gulaliyev - Khazar Lankaran
- (Azerbaijan) Tural Qurbatov - Khazar Lankaran
- (Azerbaijan) Räfael Qävami - MOIK Baku
- (Azerbaijan) Araz Abdullayev - Neftchi Baku
- (Azerbaijan) Javid Imamverdiyev - Neftchi Baku
- (Azerbaijan) Magomed Kurbanov - Neftchi Baku
- (Azerbaijan) Fahmin Muradbayli - Neftchi Baku
- (Brazil) Cauê - Neftchi Baku
- (Azerbaijan) Javid Taghiyev - Qarabağ
- (Azerbaijan) Mahir Madatov - Qarabağ
- (Brazil) Reynaldo - Qarabağ
- (Brazil) Richard - Qarabağ
- (Spain) Dani Quintana - Qarabağ
- (Azerbaijan) Ramazan Abbasov - Ravan Baku
- (Azerbaijan) Vugar Baybalayev - Ravan Baku
- (Azerbaijan) Nuran Gurbanov - Ravan Baku
- (Azerbaijan) Fariz Najafov - Şərurspor
- (Azerbaijan) Aziz Huseynov - Shamkir
- (Azerbaijan) Bahruz Teymurov - Shamkir
- (Azerbaijan) Igrar Semedov - Shahdag
- (Azerbaijan) Pardis Fardjad-Azad - Sumgayit
- (Azerbaijan) Khayal Najafov - Sumgayit
- (Azerbaijan) Tugay Alhüseynli - Turan Tovuz
- (Azerbaijan) Vusal Garaev - Turan Tovuz
- (Azerbaijan) Azer Mammadov - Turan Tovuz
- (Azerbaijan) Nurlan Novruzov - Zira

Own goals:

- (Azerbaijan) Şıxqayıb Şıxqayıbov (14 October 2015 vs Shamkir)
- (Azerbaijan) Rahman Musayev (14 October 2015 vs Qaradağ Lökbatan)
- (Azerbaijan) Säbayıl Bağırov (2 December 2015 vs Inter Baku)

== Notes ==
- Qarabağ have played their home games at the Tofiq Bahramov Stadium from 1993 to 2016 due to the ongoing situation in Quzanlı.
