= Bahodir Nasimov =

Uzbek footballer (born 1987)

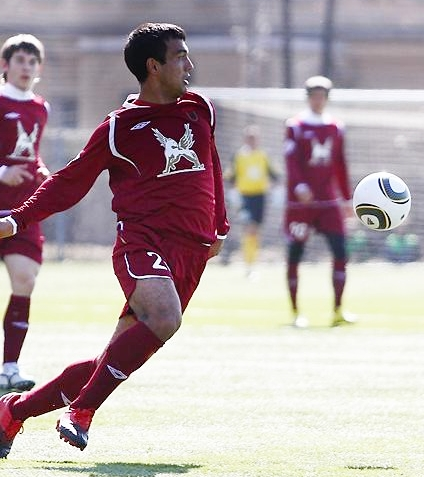

Personal information
- Full name: Bakhodir Olimjonovicj Nasimov
- Date of birth: 2 May 1987 (age 39)
- Place of birth: Samarkand, Uzbekistan, Soviet Union
- Height: 1.82 m (5 ft 11 1/2 in)
- Position: Forward

Team information
- Current team: Dinamo Samarqand
- Number: 14

Youth career
- 2005–2007: Dinamo Samarqand

Senior career*
Years	Team	Apps	(Gls)
2007–2010	Dinamo Samarqand	58	(22)
2009	→ Bunyodkor (loan)	16	(2)
2010–2011	Rubin Kazan	2	(0)
2010–2011	→ Neftchi Baku (loan)	28	(15)
2011–2014	Neftchi Baku	58	(23)
2014–2015	Padideh	17	(1)
2016	Bunyodkor	26	(8)
2017	Ansan Greeners	23	(2)
2018	Buxoro	12	(3)
2018	Keşla	7	(0)
2019	Navbahor Namangan	10	(0)
2019	Dinamo Samarqand	11	(1)
2020–2022	Sogdiana Jizzakh	49	(2)
2023–	Dinamo Samarqand	11	(0)

International career
2009–2015	Uzbekistan	20	(5)
- * Club domestic league appearances and goals as of 28 July 2026

Bakhodir Odimdjonovich Nasimov (Uzbek: Баҳодир Насимов; born 2 May 1987) is an Uzbek footballer who plays for Dinamo Samarqand as a forward.

== Career ==
=== Club ===
==== FK Dinamo Samarqand ====
Nasimov began his career with Dinamo Samarqand and made his senior debut during the 2007 Uzbek League season. During his time with Dinamo, he scored 22 league goals in 58 appearances and spent time on loan with Bunyodkor in 2009, scoring twice in 16 matches.

==== Neftchi Baku ====
In 2010 Nasimov was transferred to Russian Premier League champions Rubin Kazan for an undisclosed fee, on a three-year contract. He made two league appearances for Rubin before joining Azerbaijan Premier League club Neftchi Baku on loan for the duration of the 2010–11 season.

Nasimov scored 15 league goals during the campaign to help Neftchi be crowned champions of Azerbaijan for the sixth time. In 2011–12 season Nasimov became Top scorer of Azerbaijan Premier League with 16 goals and made significant contribution to 7th champion title of Neftchi Baku.

On 3 August 2013, in the first matchday of 2013–14 Azerbaijan Premier League Neftchi against AZAL, Nasimov scored his first goal in the new season and first goal after his injury. He scored his 32nd goal for Neftchi Baku and became the best foreign top scoring forward of the club.

==== Padideh ====
On 31 October 2014, Nasimov was confirmed as a new signing for Iranian Pro League side Padideh.

==== Keşla ====
On 10 July 2018, Nasimov signed a one-year contract with Keşla FK.

=== Navbahor Namangan ===
Nasimov joined Navbahor Namangan for the 2019 season.

== International ==
Nasimov made his debut for Uzbekistan in a 2011 Asian Cup qualifier against Malaysia on 18 November 2009 and scored the second goal in a 3–1 win. In his fourth appearance, Nasimov came on as a substitute to score twice in a 3–0 victory against Kyrgyzstan on 28 July 2011 to progress to the third round of qualifying for the 2014 FIFA World Cup.

== Career statistics ==
=== Club ===
As of match played 23 March 2023

Appearances and goals by club, season and competition
Club	Season	League			National Cup		League Cup		Continental		Other		Total	
Club	Season	Division	Apps	Goals	Apps	Goals	Apps	Goals	Apps	Goals	Apps	Goals	Apps	Goals
Rubin Kazan	2010	Russian Premier League	2	0	1	0	–		–		–		3	0
Rubin Kazan	2011–12	Russian Premier League	0	0	0	0	–		–		–		0	0
Rubin Kazan	Total		2	0	1	0	–	–	–	–	–	–	3	0
Neftchi Baku (loan)	2010–11	Azerbaijan Premier League	28	15	3	0	–		–		–		31	15
Neftchi Baku	2011–12	Azerbaijan Premier League	29	16	5	2	–		2	0	–		36	18
Neftchi Baku	2012–13	Azerbaijan Premier League	8	0	2	1	–		0	0	0	0	10	1
Neftchi Baku	2013–14	Azerbaijan Premier League	21	7	3	1	–		1	0	1	0	26	8
Neftchi Baku	Total		58	23	10	4	–	–	3	0	1	0	72	27
Padideh	2014–15	Iran Pro League	17	1	2	1	–		–		–		19	2
Bunyodkor	2016	Uzbek League	26	8	3	2	–		6	0	–		35	10
Ansan Greeners	2017	K League Challenge	23	2	0	0	–		–		–		23	2
Buxoro	2018	Uzbekistan Super League	12	3	0	0	–		–		–		12	3
Keşla	2018–19	Azerbaijan Premier League	7	0	1	0	–		1	0	–		9	0
Navbahor Namangan	2019	Uzbekistan Super League	10	0	0	0	–		–		–		10	0
Dinamo Samarqand	2019	Uzbekistan Super League	11	1	0	0	1	1	–		–		12	2
Sogdiana Jizzakh	2020	Uzbekistan Super League	23	2	0	0	–		–		–		23	2
Sogdiana Jizzakh	2021	Uzbekistan Super League	15	0	3	0	–		–		–		18	0
Sogdiana Jizzakh	2022	Uzbekistan Super League	11	0	5	0	–		2	0	–		18	0
Sogdiana Jizzakh	Total		49	2	8	0	–	–	2	0	-	-	59	2
Dinamo Samarqand	2023	Uzbekistan Pro League	2	0	0	0	–		–		–		2	0
Career total			245	55	28	7	1	1	12	0	1	0	287	63

=== International goals ===
Scores and results list Uzbekistan's goal tally first.

No	Date	Venue	Opponent	Score	Result	Competition
1.	18 November 2009	Bukit Jalil National Stadium, Bukit Jalil, Malaysia	Malaysia	2–0	3–1	2011 AFC Asian Cup qualification
2.	28 July 2011	Spartak Stadium, Bishkek, Kyrgyzstan	Kyrgyzstan	2–0	3–0	2014 FIFA World Cup qualification
3.	28 July 2011	Spartak Stadium, Bishkek, Kyrgyzstan	Kyrgyzstan	3–0	3–0	2014 FIFA World Cup qualification
4.	18 June 2013	Bunyodkor Stadium, Tashkent, Uzbekistan	Qatar	1–1	5–1	2014 FIFA World Cup qualification
5.	18 June 2013	Bunyodkor Stadium, Tashkent, Uzbekistan	Qatar	3–1	5–1	2014 FIFA World Cup qualification
As of 19 June 2013

== Honours ==
=== Club ===
Neftchi Baku

- Azerbaijan Premier League
  - Winner (3): 2010–11, 2011–12, 2012–13
- Azerbaijan Cup
  - Winner (2): 2012–13, 2013–14

=== Individual ===
- Azerbaijan Premier League Top Scorer: 2011–12 (16 goals)
