= Rashad Abdullayev =

Azerbaijani footballer (born 1981)

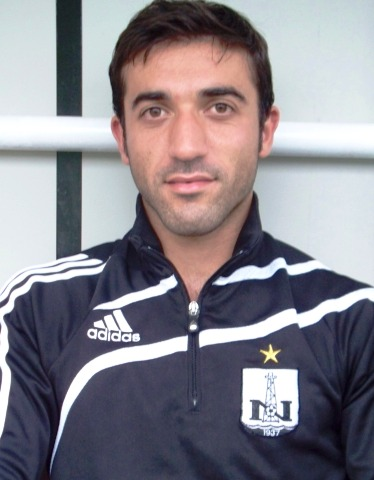

Personal information
- Full name: Rashad Gahraman oglu Abdullayev
- Date of birth: 1 October 1981 (age 45)
- Place of birth: Baku, Soviet Union
- Height: 1.72 m (5 ft 8 in)
- Position: Midfielder

Senior career*
Years	Team	Apps	(Gls)
1998–2004	Xazar-Universitesi	45	(9)
2004–2009	Khazar Lankaran	116	(12)
2009–2012	Neftchi Baku	86	(16)
2012–2013	Gabala	25	(5)
2013	Baku	0	(0)
2013–2014	→ Ravan Baku (loan)	14	(0)
2014–2015	AZAL	41	(7)
2015–2016	Zira	24	(4)
2016–2017	AZAL	17	(2)

International career
2004–2006	Azerbaijan	10	(0)
- * Club domestic league appearances and goals as of 2 May 2017

Rashad Abdullayev (Azerbaijani: Rəşad Abdullayev; born 1 October 1981) is a retired Azerbaijani footballer who played as a midfielder.

== Career ==
=== Gabala ===
In May 2012, Abdullayev signed a one-year contract with Gabala. Abdullayev made his debut for Gabala on 4 August 2012 in a 1–1 draw away to Simurq. After scoring 5 goals in 28 appearances during his season at Gabala, his contract was not renewed and he left the club.

=== FK Baku ===
Shortley after his contract expired with Gabala, Abdullayev signed a one-year contract, worth in the region of $300,000, with FK Baku. On 23 July 2013, before Abdullayev had made a competitive appearance for the club, Abdullayev left FK Baku and joined city rivals Ravan Baku on loan.

=== AZAL ===
On 11 January 2014, Abdullayev cut short his loan with Ravan Baku, to move from Baku to AZAL on an 18-month contract.

=== Zira ===
After Abdullayev's contract with AZAL expired, he signed a one-year contract with newly promoted Zira FK. Zira announced on 23 May that Abdullayev had left the club at the end of his contract.

== Career statistics ==
=== Club ===
As of match played 20 May 2016

Appearances and goals by club, season and competition
Club	Season	League			National Cup		Continental		Other		Total	
Club	Season	Division	Apps	Goals	Apps	Goals	Apps	Goals	Apps	Goals	Apps	Goals
Xazar Universitesi	1999–2000	Top League	6	1			-		-		6	1
Xazar Universitesi	2000–01	Top League	18	3			-		-		18	3
Xazar Universitesi	2001–02	Top League	21	5			-		-		21	5
Xazar Universitesi	2002-03	Top League	no league championship was held.								-	-
Xazar Universitesi	2003–04	Top League	15	3			-		-		15	3
Xazar Universitesi	Total		60	12			-	-	-	-	60	12
Khazar Lankaran	2004–05	Top League	26	2			-		-		26	2
Khazar Lankaran	2005–06	Top League	24	0			2	0	-		26	0
Khazar Lankaran	2006–07	Top League	23	4			-		-		23	4
Khazar Lankaran	2007–08	Top League	24	4			2	0	-		26	4
Khazar Lankaran	2008–09	Top League	18	2			2	0	-		20	2
Khazar Lankaran	Total		115	12			6	0	-	-	121	12
Neftchi Baku	2009–10	Premier League	26	2			-		-		26	2
Neftchi Baku	2010–11	Premier League	26	7	3	1	-		-		29	8
Neftchi Baku	2011–12	Premier League	27	7	3	0	2	0	-		32	7
Neftchi Baku	Total		79	16	6	1	2	0	-	-	87	17
Gabala	2012–13	Premier League	25	5	3	0	–		–		28	5
Baku	2013–14	Premier League	0	0	0	0	–		–		0	0
Ravan Baku (loan)	2013–14	Premier League	14	0	1	1	–		–		15	1
AZAL	2013–14	Premier League	13	0	0	0	–		–		13	0
AZAL	2014–15	Premier League	28	7	3	0	–		–		31	7
AZAL	Total		41	7	3	0	-	-	-	-	44	7
Zira	2015–16	Premier League	24	1	1	0	–		–		25	1
AZAL	2016–17	Premier League	17	2	3	0	–		–		20	2
Career total			375	55	17	2	8	0	-	-	400	57

=== International ===
Azerbaijan national team
Year	Apps	Goals
2004	5	0
2005	4	0
2006	1	0
Total	10	0

== Honours ==
=== Club ===
Khazar Lankaran

- Azerbaijan Cup: 2007–08

Neftchi Baku

- Azerbaijan Premier League: 2010–11, 2011–12
