= Araz Abdullayev =

Azerbaijani footballer (born 1992)

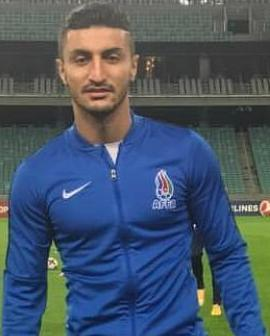
- Abdullayev in national team training in 2017

Personal information
- Full name: Araz Abdulla oğlu Abdullayev
- Date of birth: 18 April 1992 (age 34)
- Place of birth: Baku, Azerbaijan
- Height: 1.80 m (5 ft 11 in)
- Position: Midfielder

Team information
- Current team: Karvan

Youth career
- Neftchi Baku

Senior career*
| Years | Team | Apps | (Gls) |
| 2008–2011 | Neftchi Baku | 33 | (2) |
| 2011–2012 | Everton | 0 | (0) |
| 2011 | → Neftchi Baku (loan) | 8 | (3) |
| 2012 | → Panionios (loan) | 8 | (0) |
| 2012–2016 | Neftchi Baku | 123 | (23) |
| 2017–2018 | Gabala | 9 | (0) |
| 2017–2018 | → Anorthosis (loan) | 30 | (3) |
| 2018–2020 | Panionios | 0 | (0) |
| 2018–2020 | → Qarabağ (loan) | 29 | (3) |
| 2020–2021 | Boluspor | 24 | (2) |
| 2021–2022 | Ethnikos Achna | 13 | (0) |
| 2022 | Sumgayit | 23 | (1) |
| 2023 | Llapi | 5 | (0) |
| 2024 | Zira | 3 | (0) |
| 2024–2025 | Qaradağ Lökbatan | 8 | (?) |
| 2025– | Karvan | 10 | (3) |

International career^{‡}
| 2006–2008 | Azerbaijan U17 | 9 | (2) |
| 2008–2009 | Azerbaijan U19 | 8 | (2) |
| 2008–2013 | Azerbaijan U21 | 8 | (3) |
| 2008– | Azerbaijan | 40 | (3) |
- * Club domestic league appearances and goals as of 22 June 2026 ‡ National team caps and goals as of 14 September 2020

Araz Abdulla oğlu Abdullayev (born 18 April 1992) is an Azerbaijani footballer who plays as a winger for Azerbaijani club Karvan and the Azerbaijan national team.

== Career ==
=== Club ===
==== Early years ====
Born in Baku, Abdullayev played for Neftchi Baku's youth team from January 2007 to December 2008. He made his first team debut for Neftchi on 5 October 2008. In November 2011, Neftchi Baku celebrated its 1000th goal, which is scored by Araz Abdullayev.

==== Everton ====
English Premier League club Everton agreed a deal on 4 July 2010 that gave them first option to sign Abdullayev over the next two years if a work permit could be attained. On 21 September, it was announced that he will start on an initial three-year contract, with the option for two more seasons, when the transfer window opens in January 2011. On 7 January 2011, it was announced that Everton signed long-term contract with Abdullayev subject to him being granted a work permit, even though the length of contract was not revealed and allowed him to play for the Neftchi until Azerbaijan Premier League's end. He returned to Everton for their 2011–12 Premier League campaign and featured in Everton Reserves first friendly of the season against Freiburg in the 2011 Lev Yashin Cup.

===== Loan to Panionios =====
On 27 December 2011, Abdullayev joined Panionios on a season-long loan. He debuted in friendly match on 30 December 2011, against Koropi, Abdullayev played 61 minutes in the starting lineup, Panionios won 3–2. Abdullayev made his Super League Greece debut for Panionios in a 2–0 home victory against Asteras Tripolis on 3 January 2012.

==== Return to Neftchi ====
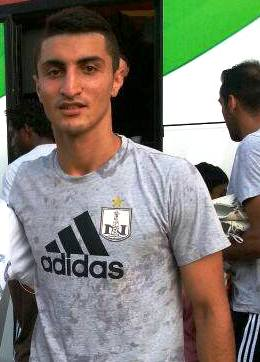
Abdullayev with Neftchi Baku in 2014

Abdullayev returned to Neftchi Baku in the summer of 2012 and soon became the main squad player. During the 2012–13 season, he helped his team to become the first Azerbaijani team to advance to the group stage of UEFA Europa League. Neftchi was drawn in Group H alongside Internazionale, Rubin Kazan and Partizan. Araz made five appearances in the UEFA Europa League group stage. On 20 September 2012, Abdullayev made his debut in the UEFA Europa League group stage game against Partizan, entering as a substitute for Flavinho in the 78th minute. The same season, Neftchi Baku won both the Azerbaijan Premier League and Azerbaijan Cup. Abdullayev won the National Cup with Neftchi once again in the 2013–14 season and became a runner-up in 2014–15 and 2015–16 seasons, losing to Qarabağ in the final match both times. During the 4.5 years spent at Neftchi, Araz Abdullayev played a total of 173 games in all tournaments and scored 25 goals.

Araz scored his first European goal against Slovenian Koper in the second qualifying round of the 2014–15 UEFA Europa League. He scored 3 goals in 25 matches during the club's European matches.

==== Gabala ====
On 31 December 2016, Abdullayev signed a two-year contract with Gabala. Abdullayev made his Azerbaijan Premier League debut for Gabala played 84 minutes in the starting lineup, in a 1–1 away draw against Kapaz on 28 February 2017.

===== Loan to Anorthosis =====
On 12 August 2017, Anorthosis announced the signing of Abdullayev on a season-long loan deal. Abdullayev made his Cypriot First Division debut for Anorthosis played 83 minutes in the starting lineup, in a 1–1 away draw against Nea Salamis on 20 August 2017. He scored his first goal for Anorthosis in the Cypriot First Division match against AEL Limassol in a 1–1 home draw on 25 November 2017.

==== Panionios ====
On 7 July 2018, Abdullayev signed a two-year contract with Super League side Panionios.

===== Loan to Qarabağ =====
On 31 August 2018, Qarabağ FK announced the signing of Abdullayev on a two-year loan deal.

==== Boluspor ====
On 15 September 2020, Abdullayev signed a 1+1 year contract with Turkish club Boluspor.

==== Sumgayit ====
On 15 January 2022, Abdullayev signed for Sumgayit on a contract until the end of the 2021–22 season, with the option of an additional two-years.

==== Zira ====
On 24 March 2024, Zira announced the signing of free agent Abdullayev on a contract until the end of the season.

==== Qaradağ Lökbatan ====
In October 2024, Abdullayev signed for Azerbaijan First League club Qaradağ Lökbatan.

== International ==
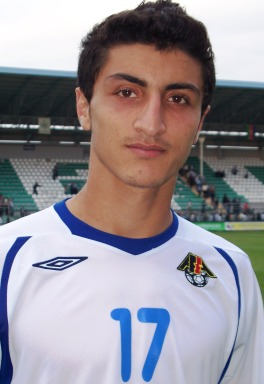
Abdullayev with Azerbaijan U21 in 2009

After a string of impressive performances at club level, Abdullayev was called up to Azerbaijan squad for the 2010 World Cup qualification match against Finland scheduled for 11 October 2008, which made him the youngest ever Azerbaijan international, making his debut at 16 years 4 months.

On 9 March 2017, he scored his first senior international goal for the Azerbaijan national football team, in a 2–1 away win friendly match against Qatar in Jassim Bin Hamad Stadium.

== Career statistics ==
=== Club ===
As of match played 12 May 2018

Appearances and goals by club, season and competition
| Club | Season | League | | | Cup | | Continental | | Other | | Total | |
| Club | Season | Division | Apps | Goals | Apps | Goals | Apps | Goals | Apps | Goals | Apps | Goals |
|---|---|---|---|---|---|---|---|---|---|---|---|---|
| Neftchi Baku | 2008–09 | Azerbaijan Premier League | 5 | 1 | 0 | 0 | 0 | 0 | — | | 5 | 1 |
| Neftchi Baku | 2009–10 | Azerbaijan Premier League | 10 | 0 | 1 | 0 | — | | — | | 11 | 0 |
| Neftchi Baku | 2010–11 | Azerbaijan Premier League | 18 | 1 | 2 | 0 | 0 | 0 | — | | 20 | 1 |
| Neftchi Baku | 2011–12 | Azerbaijan Premier League | 8 | 3 | 0 | 0 | 0 | 0 | — | | 8 | 3 |
| Neftchi Baku | Total | | 41 | 5 | 3 | 0 | 0 | 0 | — | — | 44 | 5 |
| Panionios (loan) | 2011–12 | Super League Greece | 8 | 0 | 1 | 0 | — | | — | | 9 | 0 |
| Neftchi Baku | 2012–13 | Azerbaijan Premier League | 27 | 4 | 6 | 1 | 11 | 0 | — | | 44 | 5 |
| Neftchi Baku | 2013–14 | Azerbaijan Premier League | 29 | 6 | 5 | 2 | 2 | 0 | 1 | 0 | 37 | 8 |
| Neftchi Baku | 2014–15 | Azerbaijan Premier League | 30 | 4 | 6 | 0 | 6 | 1 | — | | 42 | 5 |
| Neftchi Baku | 2015–16 | Azerbaijan Premier League | 26 | 6 | 6 | 1 | 2 | 2 | — | | 34 | 9 |
| Neftchi Baku | 2016–17 | Azerbaijan Premier League | 11 | 3 | 2 | 0 | 4 | 0 | — | | 17 | 3 |
| Neftchi Baku | Total | | 123 | 23 | 25 | 4 | 25 | 3 | — | — | 173 | 30 |
| Gabala | 2016–17 | Azerbaijan Premier League | 9 | 0 | 2 | 0 | 0 | 0 | — | | 11 | 0 |
| Gabala | 2017–18 | Azerbaijan Premier League | 0 | 0 | 0 | 0 | 0 | 0 | — | | 0 | 0 |
| Gabala | Total | | 9 | 0 | 2 | 0 | 0 | 0 | — | — | 11 | 0 |
| Anorthosis (loan) | 2017–18 | Cypriot First Division | 30 | 3 | 3 | 0 | 0 | 0 | — | | 33 | 3 |
| Career total | | | 211 | 28 | 34 | 4 | 25 | 3 | 1 | 0 | 269 | 35 |

=== International ===
Azerbaijan national team
| Year | Apps | Goals |
|---|---|---|
| 2008 | 2 | 0 |
| 2009 | 0 | 0 |
| 2010 | 1 | 0 |
| 2011 | 0 | 0 |
| 2012 | 0 | 0 |
| 2013 | 5 | 0 |
| 2014 | 6 | 0 |
| 2015 | 2 | 0 |
| 2016 | 4 | 0 |
| 2017 | 3 | 2 |
| 2018 | 8 | 1 |
| 2019 | 7 | 0 |
| 2020 | 2 | 0 |
| Total | 40 | 3 |

Statistics accurate as of match played 8 September 2020

=== International goals ===
Scores and results list Azerbaijan's goal tally first.

| No | Date | Venue | Opponent | Score | Result | Competition |
|---|---|---|---|---|---|---|
| 1. | 9 March 2017 | Jassim Bin Hamad Stadium, Doha, Qatar | Qatar | 2–1 | 2–1 | Friendly |
| 2. | 4 September 2017 | Bakcell Arena, Baku, Azerbaijan | San Marino | 2–0 | 5–1 | 2018 FIFA World Cup qualification |
| 3. | 14 October 2018 | Baku Olympic Stadium, Baku, Azerbaijan | Malta | 1–1 | 1–1 | 2018–19 UEFA Nations League D |

== Honours ==
Neftchi Baku

- Azerbaijan Premier League: 2010–11, 2012–13
- Azerbaijan Cup: 2012–13, 2013–14

Qarabağ

- Azerbaijan Premier League: 2018–19, 2019–20
