= Javid Imamverdiyev =

Azerbaijani footballer (born 1990)

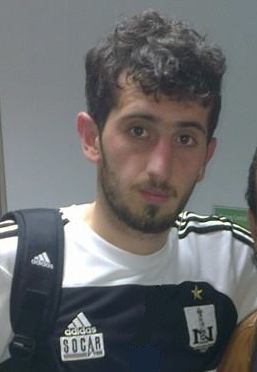

Personal information
- Date of birth: 1 August 1990 (age 36)
- Place of birth: Shamkir, Azerbaijan
- Height: 1.85 m (6 ft 1 in)
- Position: Midfielder

Team information
- Current team: Shaki
- Number: 10

Youth career
- 2005–2008: Neftchi Baku

Senior career*
Years	Team	Apps	(Gls)
2008–2017	Neftchi Baku	145	(15)
2009–2010	→ Karvan (loan)	25	(0)
2014–2015	→ Elazığspor (loan)	19	(2)
2017–2018	Sumgayit	28	(6)
2018–2020	Sabah	38	(4)
2020	Keşla	1	(0)
2020–2021	Sumgayit	13	(0)
2021–2022	Kapaz		
2023–2024	Kür-Araz		
2024–2025	Hypers Quba		
2025–	Shaki		

International career
2010–2012	Azerbaijan U21	14	(3)
2013–2018	Azerbaijan	11	(1)
- * Club domestic league appearances and goals as of 24 August 2020

Javid Imamverdiyev (Azerbaijani: Cavid İmamverdiyev; born 1 August 1990) is an Azerbaijani footballer who plays for Shaki PFK as a midfielder.

== Career ==
Imamverdiyev signed for Elazığspor on a one-year contract in September 2014.

On 4 May 2017, Imamverdiyev signed a one-year contract with Sumgayit FK.

On 12 July 2018, Imamverdiyev signed a three-year contract with Sabah FK.

On 30 June 2020, Imamverdiyev signed a one-year contract with Keşla FK.

In September 2025, Imamverdiyev joined Shaki PFK (Şəki PFK).

== Career statistics ==
=== Club ===
As of match played 23 April 2017

Appearances and goals by club, season and competition
Club	Season	League			National Cup		Continental		Other		Total	
Club	Season	Division	Apps	Goals	Apps	Goals	Apps	Goals	Apps	Goals	Apps	Goals
Neftchi Baku	2008–09	Azerbaijan Premier League	6	0			0	0	-		6	0
Neftchi Baku	2009–10	Azerbaijan Premier League	0	0	0	0	-		-		0	0
Neftchi Baku	2010–11	Azerbaijan Premier League	23	2	3	0	-		-		26	3
Neftchi Baku	2011–12	Azerbaijan Premier League	23	0	5	1	2	0	-		30	1
Neftchi Baku	2012–13	Azerbaijan Premier League	22	5	2	0	9	3	-		33	8
Neftchi Baku	2013–14	Azerbaijan Premier League	27	3	4	0	2	0	1	0	34	3
Neftchi Baku	2014–15	Azerbaijan Premier League	1	0	0	0	3	0	-		4	0
Neftchi Baku	2015–16	Azerbaijan Premier League	23	3	4	1	0	0	-		27	2
Neftchi Baku	2016–17	Azerbaijan Premier League	20	2	3	0	4	0	-		27	2
Neftchi Baku	Total		145	15	21	2	20	3	1	0	187	20
Karvan (loan)	2009–10	Azerbaijan Premier League	25	0			-		-		25	0
Elazığspor (loan)	2014–15	TFF First League	19	2	1	0	-		-		20	2
Career total			189	17	22	2	20	3	1	0	232	22

=== International ===
Appearances and goals by national team and year
National team	Year	Apps	Goals
Egypt	2013	1	0
Egypt	2014	1	0
Egypt	2015	–	
Egypt	2016	–	
Egypt	2017	–	
Egypt	2018	9	1
Total		11	1

Scores and results list Azerbaijan's goal tally first, score column indicates score after each Imamverdiyev goal.

List of international goals scored by Javid Imamverdiyev
No.	Date	Venue	Opponent	Score	Result	Competition
1	9 June 2018	Daugava Stadium, Riga, Latvia	Latvia	2–0	3–1	Friendly

== Honours ==
Neftchi Baku

- Azerbaijan Premier League (3): 2010–11, 2011–12, 2012–13
- Azerbaijan Cup (1): 2012–13
