= Ruslan Gurbanov =

Azerbaijani footballer (born 1991)

Personal information
- Full name: Ruslan Ildar oglu Gurbanov
- Date of birth: 12 September 1991 (age 35)
- Place of birth: Stavropol, USSR
- Height: 1.81 m (5 ft 11 1/2 in)
- Position: Forward

Youth career
- 1998–2003: Dynamo Stavropol
- 2003–2008: Rostov

Senior career*
Years	Team	Apps	(Gls)
2008–2010	Rostov	0	(0)
2008	→ Nika Krasny Sulin (loan)	9	(0)
2009	→ Taganrog (loan)	11	(0)
2010–2016	Neftçi Baku	67	(19)
2011–2013	→ Sumgayit (loan)	53	(9)
2015	→ Hajduk Split (loan)	5	(0)
2016–2018	Gabala	45	(6)
2018–2019	Sabail	21	(2)
2019–2020	Keşla	16	(2)
2020–2021	Zira	15	(1)
2021–2022	Slavia Mozyr	5	(2)

International career^{‡}
2010–2012	Azerbaijan U21	6	(1)
2015–2018	Azerbaijan	26	(1)
- * Club domestic league appearances and goals as of 31 December 2021 ‡ National team caps and goals as of 28 February 2019

Ruslan Gurbanov (Azerbaijani: Ruslan İldar oğlu Qurbanov; Russian: Руслан Илдарович Курбанов; born 12 September 1991) is an Azerbaijani former football striker.

== Career ==
=== Club ===
Gurbanov was born in 1991 in Stavropol, Russia at a Lezgi family. He played for Dynamo Stavropol and Rostov during his junior career. In 2008, he started playing for the reserve team of FC Rostov. During the next two seasons, he also played on loan for Russian Professional Football League (third division) teams Krasny Sulin and Taganrog. After being released by Rostov, Qurbanov moved to Azerbaijan where he signed a contract with the most titled local club Neftchi Baku. He played 6 matches in his first professional season and became the champion of Azerbaijan Premier League. Between 2011 and 2013, Qurbanov spent two seasons playing on loan for Sumgayit where he played 53 games and scored 9 goals. After his return to Neftchi, he became the winner of Azerbaijani Cup in 2013–14 season. He had a brief spell at Croatian football club Hajduk Split where he played 5 matches for the senior team, and a match for the reserve team. Ruslan Qurbanov returned to Neftchi once again in 2015, and became the regular player of the starting squad during the 2015–16 season. He made a total of 30 appearances in the Premier League during the season, in which he scored 13 goals and became the most goal scoring Azeri player of the league.

On 31 August 2016, Qurbanov signed a two-year contract with Gabala FK, leaving Gabala on 31 May 2018.

On 11 June 2018, Qurbanov signed with Sabail FK.

On 16 June 2020, Keşla announced that they had Qurbanov's contract with the club had not been extended and he had left the club.

On 19 July 2020, Gurbanov signed a two-year contract with Zira FK.

=== International ===
He called up for Azerbaijan at 2015.

== Career statistics ==
=== Club ===
As of match played 8 March 2020

Appearances and goals by club, season and competition
Club	Season	League			National Cup		Continental		Other		Total	
Club	Season	Division	Apps	Goals	Apps	Goals	Apps	Goals	Apps	Goals	Apps	Goals
Neftchi Baku	2010–11	Azerbaijan Premier League	6	0	1	0	-		-		7	0
Neftchi Baku	2011–12	Azerbaijan Premier League	0	0	0	0	0	0	-		0	0
Neftchi Baku	2012–13	Azerbaijan Premier League	0	0	0	0	0	0	-		0	0
Neftchi Baku	2013–14	Azerbaijan Premier League	15	3	4	1	0	0	0	0	19	4
Neftchi Baku	2014–15	Azerbaijan Premier League	12	3	1	1	3	0	-		16	4
Neftchi Baku	2015–16	Azerbaijan Premier League	31	13	6	5	2	0	-		39	18
Neftchi Baku	2016–17	Azerbaijan Premier League	3	0	0	0	4	1	-		7	1
Neftchi Baku	Total		67	19	12	7	9	1	-	-	88	27
Sumgayit (loan)	2011–12	Azerbaijan Premier League	15	2	1	0	-		-		16	2
Sumgayit (loan)	2012–13	Azerbaijan Premier League	24	6	0	0	-		-		24	6
Sumgayit (loan)	2013–14	Azerbaijan Premier League	14	0	0	0	-		-		14	0
Sumgayit (loan)	Total		53	8	1	0	-	-	-	-	54	8
Hajduk Split (loan)	2014–15	Prva HNL	5	0	2	0	0	0	-		7	0
Gabala	2016–17	Azerbaijan Premier League	21	4	3	1	6	2	-		30	7
Gabala	2017–18	Azerbaijan Premier League	24	2	5	2	0	0	-		30	4
Gabala	Total		45	6	8	3	6	2	-	-	59	11
Sabail	2018–19	Azerbaijan Premier League	21	2	2	1	-		-		23	3
Keşla	2019–20	Azerbaijan Premier League	16	2	1	0	-		-		17	2
Career total			207	37	26	11	15	3	-	-	248	50

=== International ===
Azerbaijan national team
Year	Apps	Goals
2015	8	0
2016	7	1
2017	4	1
2018	7	0
Total	26	1

Statistics accurate as of match played 20 November 2018

=== International goals ===
As of 25 February 2019

#	Date	Venue	Opponent	Score	Result	Competition	Ref
1.	4 September 2016	San Marino Stadium, Serravalle, San Marino	San Marino	1–0	1–0	2018 FIFA World Cup Qualifier	

== Honours ==
Neftchi Baku

- Azerbaijan Premier League (1): 2010–11
- Azerbaijan Cup (1): 2013–14
