= Alessandro (footballer, born August 1982) =

Brazilian footballer

Personal information
- Full name: Alessandro Viana da Silva
- Date of birth: August 10, 1982 (age 44)
- Place of birth: Recife, Brazil
- Height: 1.77 m (5 ft 9 1/2 in)
- Positions: Left full back; left wing

Senior career*
Years	Team	Apps	(Gls)
2002–2005	América-SP	14	(0)
2006–2007	Internacional-RS		
2007	Melbourne Victory	17	(0)
2008	Clube Atlético Paranaense		
2009	Vitória		
2010–2012	Neftchi Baku	43	(0)
- * Club domestic league appearances and goals

Alessandro Viana da Silva (born August 10, 1982), known as Alessandro, is a Brazilian footballer.

== Biography ==
Born in Recife, Brazil, he has previously played for Brazilian clubs sides Internacional Porto Alegre, ADAP and Angra dos Reis. Alessandro is a lightning-quick left-back who possesses a fine technique and an attacking attitude to the position. He was spotted in Brazil by Melbourne Victory coach Ernie Merrick. Merrick likened him to legendary Brazilian fullback Roberto Carlos because of his pacy runs down the flank and quality crosses.

A crowd favourite at Melbourne Victory, Alessandro was used as a left wing-back during the 2006-07 A-League season. Negotiations with the Melbourne-based club for an extension to his contract broke down in early 2007, and the player returned to Brazil, joining Atlético Paranaense.
