= Rodriguinho (footballer, born 1982) =

Brazilian footballer

Personal information
- Full name: Rodrigo Cesar Castro Cabral
- Date of birth: February 5, 1982 (age 44)
- Place of birth: Guarapuava, Brazil
- Height: 1.77 m (5 ft 10 in)
- Position: Midfielder

Youth career
- 1998–2000: Atlético Paranaense

Senior career*
Years	Team	Apps	(Gls)
2001–2004	Atlético Paranaense		
2004	Portuguesa		
2004	Botafogo		
2004–2005	Esporte Clube Bahia		
2006	Atlético Paranaense		
2006	Sport		
2006–2007	Santa Cruz		
2007	Avaí		
2008	Legião		
2008	Atlético Paranaense		
2009	Mirassol		
2009–2010	Guarani	11	(1)
2010	Santos	18	(2)
2011–2012	Neftchi Baku	8	(3)
2013	Sport		

International career
1999	Brazil U17	4	(0)
- * Club domestic league appearances and goals

Rodrigo Castro Cesar Cabral (born February 5, 1982), known as Rodriguinho, is a Brazilian former professional footballer who played as a midfielder

== Career ==
Rodriguinho started his career in 2001 at Atletico Paranaense and has gone through many clubs, such as Botafogo, Bahia and Santos FC before transferring to Azerbaijani club Neftchi.

== Career statistics ==
(Correct as of March 1, 2011)

Club	Season	State League		Série A / Série B		Copa do Brasil		Copa Libertadores		Copa Sudamericana		Total	
Club	Season	Apps	Goals	Apps	Goals	Apps	Goals	Apps	Goals	Apps	Goals	Apps	Goals
Mirassol	2009	16	3	-	-	-	-	-	-	-	-	16	3
Guarani	2009	-	-	11	1	-	-	-	-	-	-	11	1
Guarani	2010	8	1	-	-	-	-	-	-	-	-	8	1
Santos	2010	4	0	14	2	5	0	-	-	1	0	24	2
Neftchi	2010-11	-	-	3	0	-	-	-	-	-	-	3	0
Total		28	4	28	3	5	0	-	-	1	0	62	7

== Honours ==
Atlético Paranaense

- Campeonato Paranaense: 2001
- Campeonato Brasileiro: 2001
- Supercampeonato Paranaense: 2002

Sport

- Campeonato Pernambucano: 2006

Santos

- Campeonato Paulista: 2010
- Copa do Brasil: 2010

Neftchi Baku

- Azerbaijan Premier League: 2010–11
