= Yacine Hima =

Algerian footballer (born 1984)

Personal information
- Date of birth: 25 March 1984 (age 42)
- Place of birth: Lyon, France
- Height: 1.79 m (5 ft 10 in)
- Position: Midfielder

Youth career
- 1992-1996: F.C. Point Du Jour
- 2003–2004: Lyon

Senior career*
Years	Team	Apps	(Gls)
2004–2007	Lyon	0	(0)
2005–2006	→ Châteauroux (loan)	27	(6)
2007	→ Aarau (loan)	15	(0)
2007–2008	Al-Watani	25	(2)
2008–2010	Bellinzona	51	(5)
2010–2011	Eupen	5	(0)
2011	Neftchi Baku	7	(0)
2012	FC Wil	13	(1)
2013	Monts d'Or Azergues	11	(1)
2013–2016	Lyon-Duchère	42	(7)

International career
2006	Algeria	2	(0)
- * Club domestic league appearances and goals

Yacine Hima (Arabic: يسين هيما; born 25 March 1984) is an Algerian former professional footballer who played as a midfielder.

== Club career ==
Hima was born in Lyon, France

In February 2011, after cancelling his contract with Eupen, Hima joined Neftchi Baku in the Azerbaijan Premier League. On 5 August 2011 Hima joined ES Sétif. However, he was released from the club two weeks later after failing to convince the coaching staff during pre-season training. After a year without a permanent club, Hima signed a three-year contract with FC Wil in June 2012. In February 2013, Hima moved on again, this time to CFA side Monts d'Or Azergues, and 6 months later he moved on to Lyon-Duchère.

== International career ==
On 7 August 2006 Hima was called up for the first time to the Algerian National Team by Jean-Michel Cavalli for a pair of friendlies against FC Istres and Gabon. On 15 August 2006 he made his debut as a starter in the friendly against Istres, scoring a goal in the 15th minute. The following day, he made his official debut as a starter in the friendly against Gabon. In November, Hima received his second cap as a 77th-minute substitute in a friendly against Burkina Faso.

== Career statistics ==
Appearances and goals by club, season and competition
Club	Season	League			National cup		League cup		Continental		Total	
Club	Season	Division	Apps	Goals	Apps	Goals	Apps	Goals	Apps	Goals	Apps	Goals
Lyon II	2003–04	CFA	20	0			–		–		20	0
Lyon II	2004–05	CFA	29	2			–		–		29	2
Lyon II	2006–07	CFA	13	1			–		–		13	1
Châteauroux (loan)	2005–06	Ligue 2	27	6			–		–		27	6
FC Aarau (loan)	2006–07	Swiss Super League	15	0			–		–		15	0
Al-Watani	2007–08	Saudi Professional League	25	2			–		–		25	2
Bellinzona	2008–09	Swiss Super League	25	1			–		–		25	1
Bellinzona	2009–10	Swiss Super League	26	4	1	0	–		–		27	4
Eupen	2010–11	Belgian Pro League	5	0			–		–		5	0
Neftchi Baku	2010–11	Azerbaijan Premier League	7	0	0	0	–		–		7	0
FC Wil	2012–13	Swiss Challenge League	13	1			–		–		13	1
Monts d'Or Azergues	2012–13	CFA	11	1			–		–		11	1
Lyon-Duchère	2013–14	CFA	24	4	1	0	–		–		25	4
Lyon-Duchère	2014–15	CFA	11	3	1	0	–		–		12	3
Career total			251	25	3	0	0	0	0	0	254	25
