= Flavinho (footballer, born 1983) =

Brazilian footballer

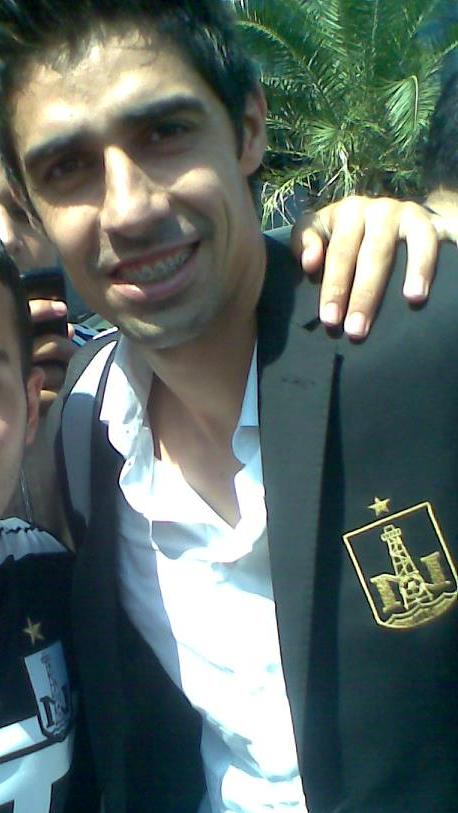

Personal information
- Full name: Flávio Alex Valêncio
- Date of birth: 27 July 1983 (age 43)
- Place of birth: Jardim, Brazil
- Height: 1.78 m (5 ft 10 in)
- Position: Attacking midfielder

Senior career*
Years	Team	Apps	(Gls)
2000–2003	CENE	-	(-)
2003	Seongnam	-	(-)
2004	CENE	-	(-)
2005	Araçatuba	-	(-)
2005	Paraná Clube	10	(0)
2006	Mineiros	-	(-)
2006	Gama	9	(0)
2007–2008	Ulbra	-	(-)
2009–2010	Grêmio Barueri	65	(7)
2010–2015	Neftchi Baku	133	(31)
2015–2016	Chapecoense	1	(0)
2016	CRB	7	(0)
- * Club domestic league appearances and goals

Flávio Alex Valêncio (better known just as Flavinho; born 27 July 1983) is a Brazilian former professional footballer. He formerly played for the Brazilian club Grêmio Barueri in the Campeonato Paulista and the Campeonato Brasileiro Série A and Neftchi Baku in the Azerbaijan Premier League

== Career ==
Flavinho left Neftchi Baku by mutual consent on 14 July 2015 after five seasons with the club. 10 days later, Flavinho returned to Brazil, signing for Chapecoense in the Série A.

== Career statistics ==
=== Club ===
As of 23 June 2015

Club performance			League		Cup		Continental		Other		Total	
Season	Club	League	Apps	Goals	Apps	Goals	Apps	Goals	Apps	Goals	Apps	Goals
Azerbaijan			League		Azerbaijan Cup		Europe		Azerbaijan Supercup		Total	
2010–11	Neftchi Baku	APL	20	11	2	3	—		—		22	14
2011–12	Neftchi Baku	APL	29	10	4	0	2	0	—		35	10
2012–13	Neftchi Baku	APL	28	5	5	1	12	2	—		45	8
2013–14	Neftchi Baku	APL	32	3	5	1	2	0	1	0	40	4
2014–15	Neftchi Baku	APL	24	2	2	0	6	0	0	0	32	2
Total			133	31	18	5	22	2	1	0	174	38

== Achievements ==
Seongnam Ilhwa Chunma

- K League (1): 2003

Neftchi Baku

- Azerbaijan Premier League (3): 2010–11, 2011–12, 2012–13
- Azerbaijan Cup (2): 2012–13, 2013–14
