= 2016–17 AZAL PFC season =

AZAL
2016–17 season
- President: Zaur Akhundov
- Manager: Tarlan Ahmadov
- Stadium: AZAL Arena
- Premier League: 10th
- Azerbaijan Cup: Quarterfinal vs Gabala
- Top goalscorer: League: David Janelidze; Nugzar Kvirtia (3); All: David Janelidze (5)

The AZAL PFK 2016–17 season was AZAL's twelfth Azerbaijan Premier League season, and thirteenth season in their history. It was their third full season with Tarlan Ahmadov as manager, during which they finished bottom of the league, with just 10 points, and were knocked out of the Azerbaijan Cup by Gabala at the Quarterfinal stage.

== Squad ==
As of 22 February 2017

Note: Flags indicate national team as defined under FIFA eligibility rules; some limited exceptions apply. Players may hold more than one non-FIFA nationality.

No.	Pos.	Nation	Player
1	GK	AZE	Tarlan Gasimzadeh
2	DF	AZE	Elshad Manafov
3	DF	AZE	Tural Hümbatov
5	DF	AZE	Kamil Huseynov
6	FW	AZE	Bakhtiyar Soltanov
7	MF	AZE	Kamal Mirzayev
8	MF	MLI	Sadio Tounkara
9	FW	AZE	Royal Najafov
10	MF	GEO	Nugzar Kvirtia
11	FW	FRA	Franck Madou
12	DF	AZE	Mahsun Gambarli
14	MF	AZE	Ilgar Alakbarov
16	DF	IRI	Ashkan Feizi
17	DF	AZE	Eltun Huseynov

No.	Pos.	Nation	Player
18	DF	AZE	Ruslan Amirjanov
19	MF	AZE	Elnur Suleymanov
21	MF	AZE	Samir Masimov
23	GK	AZE	Aqil Mammadov
24	DF	AZE	Emin Jafarguliyev (captain)
27	MF	AZE	Rashad Abdullayev
33	MF	AZE	Seyidrazi Aghayev
44	DF	LBR	Omega Roberts
55	MF	AZE	Geyrat Aliyev
65	MF	AZE	Farhad Budagov
70	FW	AZE	Vagif Javadov
77	MF	RUS	Arkadi Halperin
91	MF	MAR	Mehdi Taouil
95	MF	AZE	Shirmammad Mammadov

== Transfers ==
=== Summer ===
In: Note: Flags indicate national team as defined under FIFA eligibility rules; some limited exceptions apply. Players may hold more than one non-FIFA nationality.

No.	Pos.	Nation	Player
9	FW	AZE	Royal Najafov (from (Azerbaijan) MOIK Baku)
12	MF	AZE	Mahsun Gambarli (from (Azerbaijan) Khazar Lankaran)
15	DF	HKG	Brian Fok (loan from (China) Shanghai Greenland Shenhua)
16	DF	IRI	Ashkan Feizi
17	MF	AZE	Rashad Abdullayev (from (Azerbaijan) Zira)
18	DF	AZE	Ruslan Amirjanov (from (Azerbaijan) Inter Baku)
19	MF	AZE	Elnur Suleymanov (from (Azerbaijan) Inter Baku)
23	GK	AZE	Aqil Mammadov (from (Azerbaijan) Neftçi Baku)
55	MF	AZE	Geyrat Aliyev (from (Azerbaijan) Baku)
—	DF	AZE	Ilyas Safarzade (from (Azerbaijan) Khazar Lankaran)
—	MF	AZE	Elvin Hasanaliyev (from (Azerbaijan) Ravan Baku)

Out: Note: Flags indicate national team as defined under FIFA eligibility rules; some limited exceptions apply. Players may hold more than one non-FIFA nationality.

No.	Pos.	Nation	Player
2	DF	AZE	Rail Malikov (to (Azerbaijan) Sumgayit)
7	MF	AZE	Tarlan Khalilov
8	MF	AZE	Seymur Asadov (to (Azerbaijan) Sumgayit)
9	FW	AZE	Aydin Gasimov
15	FW	AZE	Rufat Musayev
16	GK	MDA	Stanislav Namașco (to (Greece) Levadiakos)
19	FW	AZE	Mahammad Badalbayli
21	MF	AZE	Murad Sattarli (to (Azerbaijan) Zira)
27	MF	GEO	Aleksandre Guruli (to (Georgia (country)) Shukura Kobuleti)

=== Winter ===
In: Note: Flags indicate national team as defined under FIFA eligibility rules; some limited exceptions apply. Players may hold more than one non-FIFA nationality.

No.	Pos.	Nation	Player
1	MF	AZE	Tarlan Gasimzadeh (from (Azerbaijan) Mil-Muğan)
6	FW	AZE	Bakhtiyar Soltanov (from (Azerbaijan) Qaradağ Lökbatan)
8	MF	MLI	Sadio Tounkara
11	FW	FRA	Franck Madou
21	MF	AZE	Samir Masimov (from (Slovenia) Domžale)
44	DF	LBR	Omega Roberts (from (Serbia) Donji Srem)
70	FW	AZE	Vagif Javadov (from (Azerbaijan) Sumgayit)
77	MF	RUS	Arkadi Halperin
91	MF	MAR	Mehdi Taouil

Out: Note: Flags indicate national team as defined under FIFA eligibility rules; some limited exceptions apply. Players may hold more than one non-FIFA nationality.

No.	Pos.	Nation	Player
1	GK	AZE	Rashad Azizli
4	DF	RUS	Qvanzav Məhəmmədov
6	MF	AZE	Tagim Novruzov
11	FW	AZE	Ruslan Nasirli
15	DF	HKG	Brian Fok (loan return to (China) Shanghai Greenland Shenhua)
21	FW	GEO	David Janelidze (to (Ukraine) Inhulets Petrove)
77	MF	USA	Adan Coronado
88	MF	AZE	Mirzaga Huseynpur

Trialists: Note: Flags indicate national team as defined under FIFA eligibility rules; some limited exceptions apply. Players may hold more than one non-FIFA nationality.

No.	Pos.	Nation	Player
—	DF	LBR	Omega Roberts

== Competitions ==
=== Azerbaijan Premier League ===
==== Results summary ====
Overall								Home						Away					
Pld	W	D	L	GF	GA	GD	Pts	W	D	L	GF	GA	GD	W	D	L	GF	GA	GD
28	1	7	20	11	49	−38	10	0	4	10	5	19	−14	1	3	10	6	30	−24

Last updated: 29 April 2017.
Source: See Results

==== Results ====
6 August 2016 1	AZAL	0 – 2	Neftchi Baku	Baku
18:00 AZT (UTC+4)	E.Manafov (yellow card) 18'; R.Nasirli (red card) 36'	Report	Jairo (yellow card) 23' (yellow-red card) 36'; E.Badalov 60'; K.Gurbanov (yellow card) 65'; Hajiyev 70'	Stadium: AZAL Arena; Attendance: 350; Referee: Rahim Həsənov

13 August 2016 2	Kapaz	0 – 0	AZAL	Ganja
17:00 AZT (UTC+4)	K.Diniyev (yellow card) 53'; Renan (yellow card) 76'	Report	Coronado (yellow card) 32'	Stadium: Ganja City Stadium; Attendance: 5,000; Referee: Aliyar Ağayev

19 August 2016 3	Zira	3 – 1	AZAL	Zirə
19:00 AZT (UTC+4)	Đurić (yellow card) 38'; Progni 39', 85'; E.Mammadov 45' (pen.)	Report	I.Alakbarov (yellow card) 45'; D.Janelidze 67'	Stadium: Zira Olympic Sport Complex Stadium; Attendance: 500; Referee: Fariz Yusifov

9 September 2016 4	Qarabağ	6 – 0	AZAL	Masazır
18:30 AZT (UTC+4)	Reynaldo 2', 64'; Medvedev 42', 66' (yellow card) 50'; Míchel 45+1'; Quintana 59'	Report	D.Janelidze (yellow card) 24'; E.Manafov (yellow card) 72'	Stadium: Alinja Arena; Attendance: 500; Referee: Orphan Mammadov

19 September 2016 5	Gabala	3 – 0	AZAL	Qabala
18:00 AZT (UTC+4)	Ozobić 31'; Qurbanov 56'; R.Huseynov 65'	Report	T.Hümbatov (yellow card) 41'; Amirjanov (yellow card) 54'; I.Alakbarov (yellow card) 79'; G.Magomedov (yellow card) 90+2'	Stadium: Gabala City Stadium; Attendance: 1,000; Referee: Ingilab Məmmədov

24 September 2016 6	AZAL	1 – 3	Inter Baku	Baku
16:00 AZT (UTC+4)	G.Magomedov (yellow card) 31'; T.Hümbatov (yellow card) 45'; Kvirtia 54'	Report	Hajiyev 45+1' (pen.); Aliyev 63'; Ramazanov 65' (yellow card) 76'	Stadium: AZAL Arena; Attendance: 300; Referee: Aliyar Ağayev

1 October 2016 7	Sumgayit	1 – 1	AZAL	Sumqayit
17:00 AZT (UTC+4)	Hüseynov (yellow card) 25'; M.Abbasov 83'; Javadov (yellow card) 87'	Report	I.Alakbarov 9'; Jafarguliyev (yellow card) 36'; Coronado (yellow card) 66'; E.Suleymanov (yellow card) 78'; A.Mammadov (yellow card) 90'	Stadium: Kapital Bank Arena; Attendance: 1,500; Referee: Ingilab Məmmədov

16 October 2016 8	AZAL	0 – 1	Kapaz	Baku
16:00 AZT (UTC+4)	K.Mirzayev (yellow card) 5'	Report	J.Javadov (yellow card) 15'; Ebah 83'	Stadium: AZAL Arena; Attendance: 300; Referee: Orkhan Məmmədov

24 October 2016 9	AZAL	1 – 1	Zira	Baku
16:00 AZT (UTC+4)	G.Aliyev (yellow card) 40'; Coronado (yellow card) 46'; T.Hümbatov (yellow card) 54'; D.Janelidze 64'	Report	Meza 25' (pen.) (yellow card) 41'; Naghiyev (yellow card) 48'; Progni (yellow card) 67'; Lourenço (yellow card) 83'	Stadium: AZAL Arena; Attendance: 200; Referee: Rauf Jabbarov

29 October 2016 10	AZAL	0 – 1	Qarabağ	Baku
17:00 AZT (UTC+4)	T.Hümbatov (yellow card) 28'; K.Mirzayev (yellow card) 33'; Jafarguliyev (yellow card) 55'	Report	Guseynov (yellow card) 37'; Muarem 63'	Stadium: AZAL Arena; Attendance: 1,000; Referee: Orkhan Məmmədov

6 November 2016 11	AZAL	0 – 0	Gabala	Baku
14:00 AZT (UTC+4)	K.Mirzayev (yellow card) 11'; Kvirtia (yellow card) 84'; R.Nasirli (yellow card) 85'; A.Mammadov (yellow card) 90'; Coronado (yellow card) 90+5'	Report	Qurbanov (yellow card) 52'; E.Jamalov (yellow card) 54'	Stadium: AZAL Arena; Attendance: 200; Referee: Ingilab Məmmədov

20 November 2016 12	Inter Baku	3 – 0	AZAL	Baku
16:00 AZT (UTC+4)	S.Alkhasov (yellow card) 14' (goal) 65'; Abışov 23' (pen.); Qirtimov 56'; Guliyev (yellow card) 82'	Report	Fok (yellow card) 22' (yellow-red card) 68'; T.Novruzov (yellow card) 56'; G.Magomedov (yellow card) 82'; E.Huseynov (yellow card) 89'	Stadium: Inter Arena; Attendance: 300; Referee: Aliyar Ağayev

27 November 2016 13	AZAL	1 – 1	Sumgayit	Baku
16:00 AZT (UTC+4)	D.Janelidze (yellow card) 14'; A.Coronado (yellow card) 30' (yellow-red card) 85'; Kvirtia 38'; K.Huseynov (yellow card) 41'; Mirzaga Huseynpur (yellow card) 90+3'	Report	Malikov (yellow card) 15'; Kurbanov (yellow card) 15'; Guluzade (yellow card) 54'; Yunanov 86' (pen.); Hüseynov (yellow card) 90+2'	Stadium: AZAL Arena; Attendance: 150; Referee: Ramil Diniyev

17 December 2016 14	Neftchi Baku	0 – 1	AZAL	Baku
16:00 AZT (UTC+4)	Jairo (yellow card) 63'	Report	I.Alakbarov (yellow card) 67'; D.Janelidze 80'; E.Suleymanov (yellow card) 82'; Amirjanov (yellow card) 88'	Stadium: Dalga Arena; Attendance: 150; Referee: Rauf Jabbarov

29 January 2017 15	Zira	2 – 1	AZAL	Zirə
15:00 AZT (UTC+4)	Meza 11', 29' (yellow card) 72'; Mustafayev (yellow card) 32'	Report	Abdullayev 50'; K.Mirzayev (yellow card) 52'	Stadium: Zira Olympic Sport Complex Stadium; Attendance: 800; Referee: Ravan Həmzəzadə

3 February 2017 16	AZAL	1 – 2	Qarabağ	Baku
15:00 AZT (UTC+4)	Abdullayev 7'; Tounkara (yellow card) 11' (yellow-red card) 45+3'; E.Huseynov (yellow card) 90'	Report	Diniyev (yellow card) 6' (goal) 63'; Medvedev 60'; Ramazanov (yellow card) 78'	Stadium: AZAL Arena; Attendance: 650; Referee: Orkhan Məmmədov

8 February 2017 17	Gabala	2 – 0	AZAL	Qabala
15:00 AZT (UTC+4)	Sadiqov (yellow card) 72'; Stanković (yellow card) 74'; Ozobić 64' (pen.), 90+3' (yellow card) 79'; Kvekveskiri (yellow card) 79'	Report	Roberts (yellow card) 3' (yellow-red card) 63'; E.Suleymanov (yellow card) 44'; Jafarguliyev (yellow card) 45'; Mammadov (yellow card) 75'; S.Mammadov (yellow card) 84'	Stadium: Gabala City Stadium; Attendance: 1,000; Referee: Ingilab Məmmədov

13 February 2017 18	AZAL	0 – 1	Inter Baku	Baku
15:00 AZT (UTC+4)	T.Hümbatov (yellow card) 30'; Kvirtia (yellow card) 90+1'	Report	F.Bayramov (yellow card) 66'; Hajiyev 84'	Stadium: AZAL Arena; Attendance: 500; Referee: Elvin Əsgərov

19 February 2017 19	Sumgayit	1 – 0	AZAL	Sumqayit
15:00 AZT (UTC+4)	Y.Nabiyev 13'; Kurbanov (yellow card) 45+1'	Report	Tounkara (yellow card) 90+3'	Stadium: Kapital Bank Arena; Attendance: 1,500; Referee: Rahim Həsənov

27 February 2017 20	AZAL	0 – 1	Neftchi Baku	Baku
15:30 AZT (UTC+4)		Report	Lucas 4'; Alasgarov (yellow card) 31'; Folprecht (yellow card) 69'; Agayev (yellow card) 90+3'	Stadium: AZAL Arena; Attendance: 400; Referee: Omar Paşayev

5 March 2017 21	Kapaz	1 – 1	AZAL	Ganja
15:00 AZT (UTC+4)	S.Aliyev 39'; Dário (yellow card) 69'; J.Javadov (yellow card) 90+1'	Report	Amirjanov (yellow card) 51'; Javadov 90'	Stadium: Ganja City Stadium; Attendance: 6,200; Referee: Orkhan Məmmədov

14 March 2017 22	Qarabağ	1 – 0	AZAL	Baku
17:00 AZT (UTC+4)	Diniyev (yellow card) 58'; Sadygov (yellow card) 60'; Ndlovu 68'; Garayev (yellow card) 88'	Report	Taouil (yellow card) 55'	Stadium: Azersun Arena; Attendance: 750; Referee: Rahim Həsənov

19 March 2017 23	AZAL	1 – 1	Gabala	Baku
15:30 AZT (UTC+4)	T.Hümbatov (yellow card) 42'; Kvirtia (yellow card) 81' (goal) 90'; Tounkara (yellow card) 88'	Report	Weeks (yellow card) 16'; T.Mutallimov 52'; Kvekveskiri (yellow card) 90+2'	Stadium: AZAL Arena; Attendance: 300; Referee: Omar Paşayev

2 April 2017 24	Inter Baku	2 – 1	AZAL	Baku
17:00 AZT (UTC+4)	Fardjad-Azad (yellow card) 28'; Denis 48'; F.Bayramov (yellow card) 67'; Khizanishvili (yellow card) 74'; Aliyev 90+1'	Report	Tounkara (yellow card) 79'; Amirjanov 90+3'	Stadium: Inter Arena; Attendance: 350; Referee: Ravan Həmzəzadə

10 April 2017 25	AZAL	1 – 2	Sumgayit	Baku
17:30 AZT (UTC+4)	Amirjanov 41'; Jafarguliyev (yellow card) 90'	Report	Yunanov 22'; N.Mukhtarov (yellow card) 40'; M.Abbasov 64'; B.Hasanalizade (yellow card) 75'	Stadium: AZAL Arena; Attendance: 300; Referee: Rauf Jabbarov

15 April 2017 26	Neftchi Baku	4 – 0	AZAL	Baku
18:30 AZT (UTC+4)	Folprecht 13' (yellow card) 74'; Lucas 17'; Herrera 35'; Hajiyev 55'	Report	K.Huseynov (yellow card) 45'	Stadium: Bakcell Arena; Attendance: 1,000; Referee: Orkhan Məmmədov

23 April 2017 27	AZAL	1 – 2	Kapaz	Baku
17:00 AZT (UTC+4)	Madou 82'	Report	Serginho 37', 43'; J.Javadov (yellow card) 38'	Stadium: AZAL Arena; Attendance: 330; Referee: Ravan Həmzəzadə

29 April 2017 28	AZAL	0 – 3	Zira	Baku
16:00 AZT (UTC+4)		Report	Mammadov 34'; Đurić 54'; T.Khalilzade 83' (pen.)	Stadium: AZAL Arena; Attendance: 150; Referee: Aliyar Ağayev

==== League table ====
Pos	Team	Pld	W	D	L	GF	GA	GD	Pts	Qualification or relegation
4	Zira	28	10	9	9	29	26	+3	39	Qualification for the Europa League first qualifying round
5	Kapaz	28	9	9	10	24	27	−3	36	
6	Sumgayit	28	9	8	11	28	35	−7	35	
7	Neftçi Baku	28	9	2	17	24	45	−21	29	
8	AZAL (R)	28	1	7	20	13	50	−37	10	Relegation to the Azerbaijan First Division

Source: PFL (in Azerbaijani), UEFA, Soccerway
Rules for classification: 1) Points; 2) Head-to-head points; 3) Head-to-head goal difference; 4) Head-to-head goals scored; 5) Head-to-head away goals scored (only if two teams); 6) Goal difference; 7) Goals scored.
(R) Relegated

=== Azerbaijan Cup ===
2 December 2016 Second Round	AZAL	4 – 0	Ravan Baku	Baku
16:00 AZT (UTC+4)	S.Mammadov 12'; A.Najafov (yellow card) 60'; Mirzaga Huseynpur 62'; Abdullayev (yellow card) 72'; D.Janelidze 80', 85'	Report	M.Haşımlı (yellow card) 82'; Z.Quliyev (red card) 90+1'	Stadium: AZAL Arena; Attendance: 100; Referee: Fariz Yusifov

13 December 2016 Quarterfinal First Leg	Gabala	2 – 1	AZAL	Qabala
15:00 AZT (UTC+4)	Ozobić 61'; Qurbanov 74' (yellow card) 90+1'	Report	Mirzaga Huseynpur 37'; Amirjanov (yellow card) 76'	Stadium: Gabala City Stadium; Attendance: 500; Referee: Fariz Yusifov

21 December 2016 Quarterfinal Second Leg	AZAL	0 – 1 (1 – 3 agg.)	Gabala	Baku
16:00 AZT (UTC+4)	D.Janelidze (yellow card) 32'; K.Hüseynov (yellow card) 51'; K.Mirzayev (yellow card) 68'; E.Huseynov (yellow card) 87'	Report	Stanković (yellow card) 24'; A.Mammadov 53'	Stadium: AZAL Arena; Attendance: 250; Referee: Fariz Yusifov

== Squad statistics ==
As of Match played 29 April 2017

=== Appearances and goals ===
No.	Pos	Nat	Player	Total		Premier League		Azerbaijan Cup	
No.	Pos	Nat	Player	Apps	Goals	Apps	Goals	Apps	Goals
1	GK	(Azerbaijan) AZE	Tarlan Gasimzadeh	1	0	1	0	0	0
2	DF	(Azerbaijan) AZE	Elshad Manafov	10	0	10	0	0	0
3	DF	(Azerbaijan) AZE	Tural Hümbatov	20	0	16+1	0	3	0
5	DF	(Azerbaijan) AZE	Kamil Huseynov	25	0	22	0	3	0
6	FW	(Azerbaijan) AZE	Bakhtiyar Soltanov	5	0	4+1	0	0	0
7	MF	(Azerbaijan) AZE	Kamal Mirzayev	24	0	21	0	2+1	0
8	MF	(Mali) MLI	Sadio Tounkara	14	0	12+1	0	0+1	0
9	FW	(Azerbaijan) AZE	Royal Najafov	25	0	16+7	0	1+1	0
10	MF	(Georgia (country)) GEO	Nugzar Kvirtia	27	3	16+10	3	1	0
11	FW	(France) FRA	Franck Madou	8	1	2+6	1	0	0
14	MF	(Azerbaijan) AZE	Ilgar Alakbarov	19	1	16	1	3	0
17	DF	(Azerbaijan) AZE	Eltun Hüseynov	10	0	4+4	0	2	0
18	DF	(Azerbaijan) AZE	Ruslan Amirjanov	29	2	23+3	2	3	0
19	MF	(Azerbaijan) AZE	Elnur Suleymanov	19	0	8+9	0	0+2	0
21	MF	(Azerbaijan) AZE	Samir Masimov	8	0	3+5	0	0	0
23	GK	(Azerbaijan) AZE	Agil Mammadov	28	0	25	0	2+1	0
24	DF	(Azerbaijan) AZE	Emin Jafarguliyev	25	0	24	0	1	0
27	MF	(Azerbaijan) AZE	Rashad Abdullayev	20	2	14+3	2	3	0
33	MF	(Azerbaijan) AZE	Seyidrazi Aghayev	1	0	1	0	0	0
36	FW	(Azerbaijan) AZE	Rinat Aşurov	1	0	1	0	0	0
44	DF	(Liberia) LBR	Omega Roberts	5	0	5	0	0	0
51	MF	(Azerbaijan) AZE	Faud Bayramov	1	0	1	0	0	0
55	MF	(Azerbaijan) AZE	Geyrat Aliyev	4	0	3+1	0	0	0
70	FW	(Azerbaijan) AZE	Vagif Javadov	9	1	6+3	1	0	0
77	MF	(Russia) RUS	Arkadi Halperin	13	0	10+3	0	0	0
91	MF	(Morocco) MAR	Mehdi Taouil	5	0	5	0	0	0
95	MF	(Azerbaijan) AZE	Shirmammad Mammadov	3	1	1+1	0	1	1
Players who left AZAL during the season:
1	GK	(Azerbaijan) AZE	Rashad Azizli	3	0	2	0	1	0
4	DF	(Russia) RUS	Qvanzav Məhəmmədov	9	0	8	0	0+1	0
6	MF	(Azerbaijan) AZE	Tagim Novruzov	2	0	1+1	0	0	0
11	FW	(Azerbaijan) AZE	Ruslan Nasirli	11	0	7+3	0	0+1	0
15	DF	(Hong Kong) HKG	Brian Fok	3	0	2+1	0	0	0
21	FW	(Georgia (country)) GEO	David Janelidze	15	5	6+6	3	2+1	2
77	MF	(United States) USA	Adan Coronado	15	0	11+1	0	3	0
88	MF	(Azerbaijan) AZE	Mirzaga Huseynpur	10	2	1+7	0	2	2

=== Goal scorers ===
Place	Position	Nation	Number	Name	Premier League	Azerbaijan Cup	Total
1	FW	(Georgia (country))	21	David Janelidze	3	2	5
2	MF	(Georgia (country))	10	Nugzar Kvirtia	3	0	3
3	MF	(Azerbaijan)	27	Rashad Abdullayev	2	0	2
3	DF	(Azerbaijan)	18	Ruslan Amirjanov	2	0	2
3	MF	(Azerbaijan)	88	Mirzaga Huseynpur	0	2	2
6	MF	(Azerbaijan)	14	Ilgar Alakbarov	1	0	1
6	FW	(Azerbaijan)	70	Vagif Javadov	1	0	1
6	FW	(France)	11	Franck Madou	1	0	1
6	MF	(Azerbaijan)	95	Shirmammad Mammadov	0	1	1
				TOTALS	13	5	18

=== Disciplinary record ===
Number	Nation	Position	Name	Premier League		Azerbaijan Cup		Total	
Number	Nation	Position	Name	Yellow card	Red card	Yellow card	Red card	Yellow card	Red card
2	(Azerbaijan)	DF	Elshad Manafov	2	0	0	0	2	0
3	(Azerbaijan)	DF	Tural Hümbatov	6	0	0	0	6	0
4	(Russia)	DF	Qvanzav Məhəmmədov	3	0	0	0	3	0
5	(Azerbaijan)	DF	Kamil Huseynov	2	0	1	0	3	0
6	(Azerbaijan)	MF	Tagim Novruzov	1	0	0	0	1	0
7	(Azerbaijan)	MF	Kamal Mirzayev	4	0	1	0	5	0
8	(Mali)	MF	Sadio Tounkara	5	1	0	0	5	1
9	(Azerbaijan)	FW	Royal Najafov	0	0	1	0	1	0
10	(Georgia (country))	MF	Nugzar Kvirtia	3	0	0	0	3	0
11	(Azerbaijan)	FW	Ruslan Nasirli	1	1	0	0	1	1
14	(Azerbaijan)	MF	Ilgar Alakbarov	3	0	0	0	3	0
15	(Hong Kong)	DF	Brian Fok	2	1	0	0	2	1
17	(Azerbaijan)	DF	Eltun Hüseynov	2	0	1	0	3	0
18	(Azerbaijan)	DF	Ruslan Amirjanov	3	0	1	0	4	0
19	(Azerbaijan)	MF	Elnur Suleymanov	3	0	0	0	3	0
21	(Georgia (country))	FW	David Janelidze	2	0	1	0	3	0
23	(Azerbaijan)	GK	Agil Mammadov	3	0	0	0	3	0
24	(Azerbaijan)	DF	Emin Jafarguliyev	4	0	0	0	4	0
27	(Azerbaijan)	MF	Rashad Abdullayev	0	0	1	0	1	0
44	(Liberia)	DF	Omega Roberts	2	1	0	0	2	1
55	(Azerbaijan)	MF	Geyrat Aliyev	1	0	0	0	1	0
77	(United States)	MF	Adan Coronado	6	1	0	0	6	1
88	(Azerbaijan)	MF	Mirzaga Huseynpur	1	0	0	0	1	0
91	(Morocco)	MF	Mehdi Taouil	1	0	0	0	1	0
95	(Azerbaijan)	MF	Shirmammad Mammadov	1	0	0	0	1	0
			TOTALS	60	5	7	0	67	5
