= List of Azerbaijan football transfers winter 2016–17 =

This is a list of Azerbaijan football transfers in the winter transfer window 2016–17 by club. Only clubs of the 2016–17 Azerbaijan Premier League are included.

== Azerbaijan Premier League 2016-17 ==
=== AZAL ===
In: Note: Flags indicate national team as defined under FIFA eligibility rules; some limited exceptions apply. Players may hold more than one non-FIFA nationality.

No.	Pos.	Nation	Player
1	GK	AZE	Tarlan Gasimzadeh (from (Azerbaijan) Mil-Muğan)
8	MF	MLI	Sadio Tounkara
11	FW	FRA	Franck Madou
44	DF	LBR	Omega Roberts (from (Serbia) Donji Srem)
70	FW	AZE	Vagif Javadov (from (Azerbaijan) Sumgayit)
77	MF	RUS	Arkadi Halperin
—	MF	MAR	Mehdi Taouil

Out: Note: Flags indicate national team as defined under FIFA eligibility rules; some limited exceptions apply. Players may hold more than one non-FIFA nationality.

No.	Pos.	Nation	Player
1	GK	AZE	Rashad Azizli
4	DF	RUS	Qvanzav Məhəmmədov (to (Azerbaijan) Sabail)
6	MF	AZE	Tagim Novruzov
11	FW	AZE	Ruslan Nasirli
15	DF	HKG	Brian Fok (loan return to (China) Shanghai Greenland Shenhua)
21	FW	GEO	David Janelidze
77	MF	USA	Adan Coronado
88	MF	AZE	Mirzaga Huseynpur (to (Azerbaijan) Sabail)

=== Gabala ===
In: Note: Flags indicate national team as defined under FIFA eligibility rules; some limited exceptions apply. Players may hold more than one non-FIFA nationality.

No.	Pos.	Nation	Player
5	DF	AZE	Rasim Ramaldanov (from (Georgia (country)) Kolkheti-1913 Poti)
31	FW	SUI	Danijel Subotić (from (Moldova) Sheriff Tiraspol)
77	MF	AZE	Araz Abdullayev (from (Azerbaijan) Neftchi Baku)

Out: Note: Flags indicate national team as defined under FIFA eligibility rules; some limited exceptions apply. Players may hold more than one non-FIFA nationality.

No.	Pos.	Nation	Player
30	MF	CRO	Petar Franjić (to (Slovenia) NK Domžale)
39	DF	AZE	Sadig Guliyev (to (Azerbaijan) Zira)
77	MF	AZE	Ehtiram Shahverdiyev (loan to (Azerbaijan) Sumgayit)
—	DF	AZE	Bahlul Mustafazade (loan to (Azerbaijan) Sumgayit)

=== Inter Baku ===
In: Note: Flags indicate national team as defined under FIFA eligibility rules; some limited exceptions apply. Players may hold more than one non-FIFA nationality.

No.	Pos.	Nation	Player

Out: Note: Flags indicate national team as defined under FIFA eligibility rules; some limited exceptions apply. Players may hold more than one non-FIFA nationality.

No.	Pos.	Nation	Player
15	DF	AZE	Ruslan Abışov (to (Azerbaijan) Neftchi Baku)
55	FW	AZE	Aghabala Ramazanov (to (Azerbaijan) Qarabağ)

=== Kapaz ===
In: Note: Flags indicate national team as defined under FIFA eligibility rules; some limited exceptions apply. Players may hold more than one non-FIFA nationality.

No.	Pos.	Nation	Player
68	MF	AZE	Ali Nuri
94	MF	AZE	Sahib Abbasov (from (Azerbaijan) Shamkir)

Out: Note: Flags indicate national team as defined under FIFA eligibility rules; some limited exceptions apply. Players may hold more than one non-FIFA nationality.

No.	Pos.	Nation	Player

=== Neftchi Baku ===
In: Note: Flags indicate national team as defined under FIFA eligibility rules; some limited exceptions apply. Players may hold more than one non-FIFA nationality.

No.	Pos.	Nation	Player
6	DF	CZE	Pavel Dreksa (from (Czech Republic) MFK Karviná)
7	MF	AZE	Namig Alasgarov (from (Azerbaijan) Qarabağ)
8	MF	CZE	Zdeněk Folprecht (loan from (Czech Republic) Slovan Liberec)
9	FW	ARG	Hugo Bargas (from (Bolivia) Blooming)
11	FW	CHI	Ignacio Herrera (from (Kazakhstan) Irtysh Pavlodar)
12	FW	ESP	Daniel Lucas (from (Austria) St. Pölten)
15	DF	AZE	Ruslan Abışov (to (Azerbaijan) Neftchi Baku)
28	MF	UKR	Kyrylo Petrov (from (Ukraine) Olimpik Donetsk)
29	DF	GEO	Giorgi Navalovski (from (Greece) Veria)

Out: Note: Flags indicate national team as defined under FIFA eligibility rules; some limited exceptions apply. Players may hold more than one non-FIFA nationality.

No.	Pos.	Nation	Player
1	GK	CRO	Krševan Santini
6	DF	MKD	Vanče Šikov
7	MF	AZE	Araz Abdullayev (to (Azerbaijan) Gabala)
8	MF	AZE	Elshan Abdullayev (to (Azerbaijan) Qarabağ)
9	FW	ROU	Cătălin Țîră
20	DF	AZE	Eltun Yagublu (loan to (Azerbaijan) Sabail)
30	DF	CRO	Dario Melnjak (loan return to (Belgium) Lokeren)
72	DF	AZE	Bilal Abbaszade
88	MF	AZE	Orkhan Gurbanli (loan return from (Latvia) Daugavpils)
90	MF	BRA	Pessalli (to (Brazil) Paraná)
99	FW	BRA	Denílson (loan return to (Brazil) Fluminense)

=== Qarabağ ===
In: Note: Flags indicate national team as defined under FIFA eligibility rules; some limited exceptions apply. Players may hold more than one non-FIFA nationality.

No.	Pos.	Nation	Player
44	FW	AZE	Aghabala Ramazanov (from (Azerbaijan) Inter Baku)
77	MF	AZE	Elshan Abdullayev (from (Azerbaijan) Neftchi Baku)

Out: Note: Flags indicate national team as defined under FIFA eligibility rules; some limited exceptions apply. Players may hold more than one non-FIFA nationality.

No.	Pos.	Nation	Player
9	FW	BRA	Reynaldo (to (Turkey) Adanaspor)
17	FW	AZE	Namig Alasgarov (to (Azerbaijan) Neftchi Baku)
64	GK	AZE	Emil Balayev (loan to (Azerbaijan) Sabail)

=== Sumgayit ===
In: Note: Flags indicate national team as defined under FIFA eligibility rules; some limited exceptions apply. Players may hold more than one non-FIFA nationality.

No.	Pos.	Nation	Player
7	MF	RUS	Sergey Chernyshev (from (Russia) Druzhba Maykop)
13	DF	AZE	Bahlul Mustafazade (loan from (Azerbaijan) Gabala)
20	MF	RUS	Farkhad Gystarov (from (Russia) SKA Rostov-on-Don)
77	MF	AZE	Ehtiram Shahverdiyev (loan from (Azerbaijan) Gabala)

Out: Note: Flags indicate national team as defined under FIFA eligibility rules; some limited exceptions apply. Players may hold more than one non-FIFA nationality.

No.	Pos.	Nation	Player
7	FW	AZE	Vagif Javadov (to (Azerbaijan) AZAL)
11	MF	IRN	Afshin Esmaeilzadeh
13	GK	AZE	Ali Hasanli
24	MF	AZE	Amit Guluzade (to (Greece) Athlitiki Enosi Larissa)
66	MF	IRN	Ebrahim Abednezhad

=== Zira ===
In: Note: Flags indicate national team as defined under FIFA eligibility rules; some limited exceptions apply. Players may hold more than one non-FIFA nationality.

No.	Pos.	Nation	Player
7	MF	FRA	Ben Sangaré (from (France) Sedan)
16	DF	NGA	Akeem Latifu (from (Turkey) Alanyaspor)
39	DF	AZE	Sadig Guliyev (from (Azerbaijan) Gabala)
43	FW	GHA	Richard Gadze (from (India) Delhi Dynamos)
—	MF	GEO	Giorgi Gorozia (from (Norway) Stabæk)

Out: Note: Flags indicate national team as defined under FIFA eligibility rules; some limited exceptions apply. Players may hold more than one non-FIFA nationality.

No.	Pos.	Nation	Player
7	MF	ALB	Gerhard Progni
55	DF	AZE	Jamil Hajiyev (to (Azerbaijan) Shamkir)
99	FW	UKR	Yasyn Khamid
