= 2015–16 FK Khazar Lankaran season =

Khazar Lankaran
2015–16 season
- President: Mubariz Mansimov
- Manager: Elbrus Mammadov
- Stadium: Lankaran City Stadium
- Premier League: 9th
- Azerbaijan Cup: Quarterfinal
- Top goalscorer: League: Rahid Amirguliyev (4); All: Rahid Amirguliyev (4)
Home colours	Away colours

The Khazar Lankaran 2015-16 season is Khazar Lankaran's twelfth Azerbaijan Premier League season, and their first season under manager Elbrus Mammadov. They will compete in the Azerbaijan Cup and the League.

== Squad ==
As of 1 February 2016

Note: Flags indicate national team as defined under FIFA eligibility rules; some limited exceptions apply. Players may hold more than one non-FIFA nationality.

No.	Pos.	Nation	Player
1	GK	AZE	Orkhan Sadigli
4	DF	AZE	Ruslan Jafarov
5	MF	AZE	Farid Asadov
6	DF	AZE	Asif Mirili
7	MF	AZE	Orkhan Safiyaroglu
8	MF	AZE	Vugar Bäybalayev
9	FW	AZE	Bayram Budagov
10	FW	AZE	Tural Gurbatov (loan from Inter Baku)
12	DF	AZE	Ilyas Safarzade
15	DF	AZE	Nodar Mammadov
16	MF	AZE	Ibrahim Gadirzade
17	MF	AZE	Vaguf Gulaliyev
18	MF	AZE	Tural Jalilov (captain)

No.	Pos.	Nation	Player
25	GK	AZE	Tarlan Gasimzada
32	DF	AZE	Zaman Mirzazade
35	FW	AZE	Elfad Baləhmədov
41	DF	AZE	Huseyn Khalilzade
42	MF	AZE	Kamran Abdullazade
44	DF	AZE	Yusif Hasanov
66	FW	AZE	Kenan Həsənov
77	MF	AZE	Ali Aliyev
79	MF	AZE	Namig Gojayev
96	FW	AZE	Anar Babazade
97	FW	AZE	Elnur Jafarov
99	MF	AZE	Mahsum Qambarli

== Transfers ==
=== Summer ===
In: Note: Flags indicate national team as defined under FIFA eligibility rules; some limited exceptions apply. Players may hold more than one non-FIFA nationality.

No.	Pos.	Nation	Player
4	MF	BRA	Diego Souza
10	FW	AZE	Rashad Eyyubov (from (Azerbaijan) Simurq)
15	DF	AZE	Ruslan Abışov (from (Azerbaijan) Gabala)
17	FW	AZE	Vüqar Nadirov (from (Azerbaijan) Qarabağ)
21	GK	POL	Paweł Kapsa (from (Azerbaijan) Simurq)
88	FW	FRA	L´Imam Seydi (from (Hungary) Nyíregyháza Spartacus)
—	FW	AZE	Vagif Javadov (from (Turkey) Boluspor)

Out: Note: Flags indicate national team as defined under FIFA eligibility rules; some limited exceptions apply. Players may hold more than one non-FIFA nationality.

No.	Pos.	Nation	Player
4	DF	AZE	Ruslan Jäfärov (to (Azerbaijan) Zira)
4	MF	BRA	Diego Souza (to (Azerbaijan) Zira)
10	FW	AZE	Rashad Eyyubov (to (Azerbaijan) Kapaz)
15	DF	AZE	Ruslan Abışov (to (Azerbaijan) Gabala)
17	FW	AZE	Vüqar Nadirov (to (Azerbaijan) Gabala)
34	DF	AZE	Elnur İsmailov
55	FW	AZE	Aghabala Ramazanov (to (Azerbaijan) Sumgayit)
63	MF	SLE	Alfred Sankoh (to (Turkey) Balıkesirspor)
—	FW	AZE	Vagif Javadov (loan to (Azerbaijan) Gabala)

=== Winter ===
In: Note: Flags indicate national team as defined under FIFA eligibility rules; some limited exceptions apply. Players may hold more than one non-FIFA nationality.

No.	Pos.	Nation	Player
4	DF	AZE	Ruslan Jafarov (from (Azerbaijan) Zira)
6	MF	AZE	Asif Mirili (Free agent)
7	MF	AZE	Orkhan Safiyaroglu (from (Azerbaijan) Bakili)
10	FW	AZE	Tural Gurbatov (loan from (Azerbaijan) Inter Baku)
15	DF	AZE	Nodar Mammadov (from (Azerbaijan) Sumgayit)
17	MF	AZE	Vaguf Gulaliyev (from (Azerbaijan) Neftchala)

Out: Note: Flags indicate national team as defined under FIFA eligibility rules; some limited exceptions apply. Players may hold more than one non-FIFA nationality.

No.	Pos.	Nation	Player
3	DF	AZE	Rasim Ramaldanov (to (Azerbaijan) Sumgayit)
7	MF	MLI	Sadio Tounkara (to (Cyprus) Enosis Neon Paralimni)
8	MF	AZE	Elshan Rzazade (to (Azerbaijan) Neftchi Baku)
9	FW	AZE	Orkhan Aliyev
11	FW	AZE	Kazim Kazimli
14	MF	AZE	Rahid Amirguliyev (to (Azerbaijan) Qarabağ)
19	GK	CRO	Vjekoslav Tomić
21	GK	POL	Paweł Kapsa
27	DF	ROU	Adrian Scarlatache
72	DF	AZE	Elvin Mirzayev
—	FW	AZE	Vagif Javadov (to (Azerbaijan) Sumgayit, previously on loan to (Azerbaijan) Gabala)

== Friendlies ==
21 July 2015	Kayserispor (Turkey)	1 – 2	(Azerbaijan) Khazar Lankaran	Turkey
AZST (UTC+5)	Nadirov 19'	Report	S.Kaya 60'

== Competitions ==
=== Azerbaijan Premier League ===
==== Results summary ====
Overall								Home						Away					
Pld	W	D	L	GF	GA	GD	Pts	W	D	L	GF	GA	GD	W	D	L	GF	GA	GD
36	3	6	27	16	51	−35	15	2	2	14	9	23	−14	1	4	13	7	28	−21

Last updated: 20 May 2016.
Source: Soccerway

==== Results ====
9 August 2015 1	Khazar Lankaran	2 – 0	Inter Baku	Lankaran
21:00 AZST (UTC+5)	Jafarov 7'; Amirguliyev 31'; Ramaldanov (yellow card) 68'; O.Sadıqlı (yellow card) 85'	Report	N.Kvekveskiri (yellow card) 16'; L.Kasradze (yellow card) 26'; Lomaia (yellow card) 55'	Stadium: Lankaran City Stadium; Attendance: 7,000; Referee: Rahim Häsänov

16 August 2015 2	Sumgayit	1 – 1	Khazar Lankaran	Sumqayit
21:00 AZST (UTC+5)	B.Hasanalizade 10' (yellow card) 90+4'; Chertoganov (yellow card) 53'; J.Hajiyev (yellow card) 62'; E.Abdulov (yellow card) 83'	Report	Rzazade 37'; Ramaldanov (yellow card) 64'; I.Säfärzadä (yellow card) 90+3'	Stadium: Kapital Bank Arena; Attendance: 1,580; Referee: Elvvin Äsgärov

22 August 2015 3	Khazar Lankaran	1 – 1	Ravan Baku	Lankaran
21:00 AZST (UTC+5)	Rzazade (yellow card) 23' (yellow-red card) 48'; Scarlatache (yellow card) 30' (yellow-red card) 90+1'; Amirguliyev 87' (pen.) (yellow card) 87'	Report	Y.Ağakärimzadä (yellow card) 34'; Barlay (yellow card) 50'; Abbasov 55'; T. Gurbatov (yellow card) 78'; R. Tagizade (yellow card) 81'; N.Mukhtarov (yellow card) 86'	Stadium: Lankaran City Stadium; Attendance: 9,500; Referee: Rähim Häsänov

12 September 2015 4	Qarabağ	1 – 0	Khazar Lankaran	Baku
20:30 AZST (UTC+5)	Yunuszade (yellow card) 49'; Mammadov (yellow card) 67'; Armenteros (yellow card) 71' (goal) 73'	Report	Amirguliyev (yellow card) 45'; I. Säfärzadä (yellow card) 80'	Stadium: Dalğa Arena; Attendance: 1,200; Referee: Ramil Diniyev

20 September 2015 5	Neftchi Baku	1 – 1	Khazar Lankaran	Baku
21:00 AZST (UTC+5)	E.Abdullayev (yellow card) 57'; A.Abdullayev 58'; Cauê (yellow card) 82'; Añete (yellow card) 90+1'	Summary	O.Sadıqlı (yellow card) 4'; Scarlatache (yellow card) 9' (yellow-red card) 56'; Amirguliyev 60'; K.Abdullazadä (yellow card) 69'; Jafarov (yellow card) 81'	Stadium: Bakcell Stadium; Attendance: 1,500; Referee: Rahim Häsänov

27 September 2015 6	Khazar Lankaran	0 – 1	Zira	Lankaran
21:00 AZST (UTC+5)	E.Mirzəyev (yellow card) 90+2'	Report	Ivanović (yellow card) 26'; A.Nagiyev (yellow card) 86'; Abdullayev 90+3' (pen.)	Stadium: Lankaran City Stadium; Attendance: 9,700; Referee: Ingilab Mämmädov

4 October 2015 7	Gabala	6 – 0	Khazar Lankaran	Qabala
21:00 AZST (UTC+5)	Dodô 1'; Abışov (yellow card) 4'; Pereyra 10', 79'; Gai 45'; Dashdemirov (yellow card) 56'; Antonov 73'; Mirzabekov (yellow card) 87'; Zec 89'	Report	Scarlatache (yellow card) 61'	Stadium: Gabala City Stadium; Attendance: 1,500; Referee: Rähim Häsänov

18 October 2015 8	Khazar Lankaran	2 – 1	AZAL	Lankaran
18:00 AZST (UTC+5)	K.Abdullazadä 19', 90'; Amirguliyev (yellow card) 49'; S.Tounkara 65'; Jafarov (yellow card) 70'	Report	M.Sattarly 32'; I.Alakbarov (yellow card) 60'; Kvirtia (yellow card) 60'	Stadium: Lankaran City Stadium; Attendance: 5,000; Referee: Elvin Äsgärov

24 October 2015 9	Kapaz	1 – 0	Khazar Lankaran	Ganja
15:00 AZST (UTC+5)	Dário 36'	Report		Stadium: Ganja City Stadium; Attendance: 18,000; Referee: Omar Paşayev

28 October 2015 10	Khazar Lankaran	1 – 2	Sumgayit	Lankaran
17:00 AZT (UTC+4)	E.Mirzəyev (yellow card) 21'; K.Abdullazadä (yellow card) 44'; S.Tounkara (yellow card) 79'; Scarlatache (yellow card) 87'; Amirguliyev 88'	Report	T.Mikayilov 7'; A.Ramazanov 37'; E.Mehdiyev (yellow card) 75'; N.Gurbanov (yellow card) 90+2'	Stadium: Lankaran City Stadium; Attendance: 1,200; Referee: Ramil Diniyev

2 November 2015 11	Ravan Baku	0 – 1	Khazar Lankaran	Baku
21:00 AZT (UTC+4)	Suma (yellow card) 56'; E.Hasanaliyev (yellow card) 70'; Y.Ağakärimzadä (yellow card) 79'	Report	S.Tounkara (yellow card) 11'; Jafarov 80'	Stadium: Bayil Stadium; Attendance: 600; Referee: Orxan Mämmädov

8 November 2015 12	Khazar Lankaran	0 – 1	Qarabağ	Lankaran
16:00 AZT (UTC+4)		Report	Ismayilov 33'; Gurbanov (yellow card) 40'; Míchel (yellow card) 49'	Stadium: Lankaran City Stadium; Attendance: 4,700; Referee: Rauf Jabbarov

22 November 2015 13	Khazar Lankaran	0 – 2	Neftchi Baku	Lankaran
18:00 AZT (UTC+4)	K.Abdullazadä (yellow card) 43'; I.Säfärzadä (yellow card) 45+1'	Report	K.Gurbanov (yellow card) 24'; Ramos (yellow card) 43'; Imamverdiyev (yellow card) 54'; E.Abdullayev 60'; F.Muradbayli 75'	Stadium: Lankaran City Stadium; Attendance: 9,000; Referee: Aliyar Ağayev

28 November 2015 14	Zira	1 – 0	Khazar Lankaran	Baku
16:30 AZT (UTC+4)	Bonilla (yellow card) 27' (yellow-red card) 59'; Z.Mirzäzadä 49' (o.g.); Eduardo (yellow card) 88'	Report	Rzazade (yellow card) 33' (yellow-red card) 56'	Stadium: Zira Olympic Sport Complex Stadium; Attendance: 350; Referee: Orkhan Mämmädov

6 December 2015 15	Khazar Lankaran	0 – 1	Gabala	Lankaran
16:00 AZT (UTC+4)	I.Säfärzadä (yellow card) 61'	Report	Antonov 20'; E.Jamalov (yellow card) 49'; Santos (yellow card) 53'	Stadium: Lankaran City Stadium; Attendance: 1,500; Referee: Omar Paşayev

13 December 2015 16	AZAL	1 – 0	Khazar Lankaran	Baku
15:00 AZT (UTC+4)	A.Gasimov (yellow card) 34'; M.Sattarly 70'; T.Novruzov (yellow card) 73'	Report	Rzazade (yellow card) 58'	Stadium: AZAL Arena; Attendance: 600; Referee: Rauf Jabbarov

17 December 2015 17	Khazar Lankaran	0 – 1	Kapaz	Lankaran
14:00 AZT (UTC+4)		Report	K.Diniyev (yellow card) 24'; S.Rahimov 65' (yellow card) 81'; B.Rahimov (yellow card) 67'; Ebah (yellow card) 70'; Eyyubov (yellow card) 79'	Stadium: Lankaran City Stadium; Attendance: 600; Referee: Rahim Häsänov

20 December 2015 18	Inter Baku	2 – 0	Khazar Lankaran	Baku
16:30 AZT (UTC+4)	Khizanishvili 28'; A.Hüseynov (yellow card) 30'; E.Abdullayev 47'	Report	H.Xəlilzadə (yellow card) 87'	Stadium: Inter Arena; Attendance: 500; Referee: İnqilab Mämmädov

31 January 2016 19	Khazar Lankaran	0 – 0	Ravan Baku	Lankaran
13:30 AZT (UTC+4)	F.Asadov (yellow card) 56'; E.Baləhmədov (yellow card) 70'; I.Gadirzade (yellow card) 82'	Report	Aliyev (yellow card) 18'	Stadium: Lankaran City Stadium; Attendance: 800; Referee: Omar Paşayev

6 February 2016 20	Qarabağ	3 – 0	Khazar Lankaran	Baku
17:30 AZT (UTC+4)	Sadygov (yellow card) 26'; Quintana 71'; Richard 87'; Armenteros 90+2'	Report	T.Gurbatov (yellow card) 10'; R.Jafarov (yellow card) 29' (yellow-red card) 87'	Stadium: Tofiq Bahramov Stadium^{1} Attendance: 800; Referee: İnqilab Mämmädov

13 February 2016 21	Neftchi Baku	1 – 0	Khazar Lankaran	Baku
17:00 AZT (UTC+4)	K.Gurbanov (yellow card) 24'; Ramos (yellow card) 55'; E.Abdullayev 87' (yellow card) 87'; F.Muradbayli (yellow card) 90'	Report	A.Mirili (yellow card) 75'; V.Gulaliyev (yellow card) 88'	Stadium: Bakcell Arena; Attendance: 2,500; Referee: Rahim Həsənov

21 February 2016 22	Khazar Lankaran	0 – 2	Zira	Lankaran
14:00 AZT (UTC+4)	V.Gulaliyev (yellow card) 15'; Mammadov (yellow card) 59'; V.Bäybalayev (yellow card) 82'	Report	Krneta 16'; Bonilla (yellow card) 59' (goal) 74'	Stadium: Lankaran City Stadium; Attendance: 2,500; Referee: Ramil Diniyev

27 February 2016 23	Gabala	0 – 0	Khazar Lankaran	Qabala
17:00 AZT (UTC+4)	Gai (yellow card) 52'; E.Jamalov (yellow card) 65'; A.Mammadov (yellow card) 90+4'	Report	I.Gadirzade (yellow card) 68'; O.Sadigli (yellow card) 87'	Stadium: Gabala City Stadium; Attendance: 1,100; Referee: Ravan Həmzəzadə

5 March 2016 24	Khazar Lankaran	0 – 1	AZAL	Lankaran
14:00 AZT (UTC+4)	T.Gurbatov (yellow card) 14'; Mammadov (yellow card) 35'	Report	Mirzaga Huseynpur (yellow card) 34'; Guruli 36' (pen.); K.Huseynov (yellow card) 65'; Kvirtia (yellow card) 69'; Coronado (yellow card) 88'	Stadium: Lankaran City Stadium; Attendance: 3,900; Referee: Orkhan Məmmədov

13 March 2016 25	Kapaz	2 – 0	Khazar Lankaran	Ganja
15:00 AZT (UTC+4)	T.Narimanov 48'; B.Nasirov (yellow card) 75'; T.Rzayev 90+1'	Report	O.Sadigli (yellow card) 65'; Jalilov (yellow card) 77'	Stadium: Ganja City Stadium; Attendance: 12,750; Referee: Ravan Həmzəzadə

20 March 2016 26	Khazar Lankaran	0 – 1	Inter Baku	Lankaran
13:30 AZT (UTC+4)		Report	L.Kasradze (yellow card) 19'; Kvekveskiri 30'; Khizanishvili (yellow card) 51'	Stadium: Lankaran City Stadium; Attendance: 2,700; Referee: Omar Paşayev

30 March 2016 27	Sumgayit	2 – 1	Khazar Lankaran	Sumgayit
17:00 AZT (UTC+4)	A.Yunanov (yellow card) 33'; E.Mehdiyev (yellow card) 48'; Mammadov 50' (o.g.); Javadov (yellow card) 56'; M.Rahimov (red card) 70'; Agayev 90'	Report	A.Mirili (yellow card) 26'; Z.Mirzazade 49' (pen.); O.Sadigli (yellow card) 68'	Stadium: Kapital Bank Arena; Attendance: 1,200; Referee: Elvin Əsgərov

3 April 2016 28	Khazar Lankaran	1 – 2	Qarabağ	Lankaran
16:00 AZT (UTC+4)	T.Gurbatov 12'	Report	M.Mädätov 6', 73'	Stadium: Lankaran City Stadium; Attendance: 2,000; Referee: Ramil Diniyev

10 April 2016 29	Khazar Lankaran	0 – 1	Neftchi Baku	Lankaran
16:30 AZT (UTC+4)	Mammadov (yellow card) 54'	Report	Qurbanov 40'; M.Isayev (yellow card) 64'	Stadium: Lankaran City Stadium; Attendance: 3,500; Referee: Aliyar Ağayev

16 April 2016 30	Zira	1 – 0	Khazar Lankaran	Baku
16:30 AZT (UTC+4)	Bonilla 63'	Report		Stadium: Zira Olympic Sport Complex Stadium; Attendance: 1,300; Referee: Ravan Həmzəzadə

23 April 2016 31	Khazar Lankaran	0 – 1	Gabala	Lankaran
16:30 AZT (UTC+4)	M.Qambarli (yellow card) 24'; O.Sadigli (yellow card) 88'; Mammadov (yellow card) 88'	Report	Gai 9'; Vernydub (yellow card) 62'; S.Zargarov (yellow card) 66'	Stadium: Lankaran City Stadium; Attendance: 2,000; Referee: Rahim Həsənov

30 April 2016 32	AZAL	1 – 0	Khazar Lankaran	Baku
17:00 AZT (UTC+4)	Kvirtia 54'; Coronado (yellow card) 64'	Report	R.Jafarov (yellow card) 27'; V.Gulaliyev (yellow card) 55'	Stadium: AZAL Arena; Attendance: 350; Referee: Ramil Diniyev

7 May 2016 33	Khazar Lankaran	0 – 3	Kapaz	Lankaran
16:00 AZT (UTC+4)	O.Safiyaroglu (yellow card) 82'	Report	K.Diniyev 42'; Ebah 48'; S.Rahimov (yellow card) 55'; O.Əliyev (yellow card) 77' (goal) 79'	Stadium: Lankaran City Stadium; Attendance: 900; Referee: Omar Paşayev

11 May 2016 34	Inter Baku	2 – 1	Khazar Lankaran	Baku
17:00 AZT (UTC+4)	Aliyev 14'; Fomenko 27' (yellow card) 61'; Lomaia (yellow card) 90+2'	Report	Mammadov (yellow card) 15'; V.Gulaliyev 47' (yellow card) 65'	Stadium: Inter Arena; Attendance: 550; Referee: Omar Paşayev

15 May 2016 35	Khazar Lankaran	1 – 2	Sumgayit	Lankaran
18:00 AZT (UTC+4)	T.Gurbatov 34' (pen.); O.Safiyaroglu (yellow card) 55'	Report	B.Hasanalizade (yellow card) 34'; Javadov 65' (yellow card) 81'; A.Yunanov 80'; Ramaldanov (yellow card) 90+4'	Stadium: Lankaran City Stadium; Attendance: 200; Referee: Ingilab Məmmədov

20 May 2016 36	Ravan Baku	0 – 2	Khazar Lankaran	Baku
17:00 AZT (UTC+4)	K.Muslumov (yellow card) 33'; Khamid 76'; Abbasov 84' (pen.); R.Azizli (yellow card) 87'	Report	B.Budagov 2'; Z.Mirzazade (yellow card) 36'; I.Gadirzade 66'; O.Sadigli (yellow card) 80'; Jalilov (yellow card) 80'; T.Gasimzada (yellow card) 83'; V.Gulaliyev (yellow card) 90+3'	Stadium: Bayil Stadium; Attendance: 800; Referee: Ramil Diniyev

==== League table ====
Pos	Team	Pld	W	D	L	GF	GA	GD	Pts	Qualification or relegation
6	Neftçi Baku	36	13	10	13	41	41	0	49	Qualification for the Europa League first qualifying round
7	AZAL	36	13	7	16	26	38	−12	46	
8	Sumgayit	36	9	12	15	41	49	−8	39	
9	Ravan Baku	36	5	9	22	27	63	−36	18	
10	Khazar Lankaran (R)	36	3	6	27	16	51	−35	15	Relegation to the Azerbaijan First Division

Source: PFL, UEFA, Soccerway
Rules for classification: 1) Points; 2) Head-to-head points; 3) Head-to-head goal difference; 4) Head-to-head goals scored; 5) Head-to-head away goals scored (only if two teams); 6) Goal difference; 7) Goals scored.
(R) Relegated

=== Azerbaijan Cup ===
2 December 2015 Second Round	Khazar Lankaran	1 – 0	Kapaz	Lankaran
17:00 AZT (UTC+4)	K.Abdullazadä 14' (yellow card) 90+1'; Amirguliyev (yellow card) 42'; Rzazade (yellow card) 84'; O.Sadıqlı (yellow card) 87'; Jalilov (yellow card) 90+5'	Summary	T.Akhundov (yellow card) 76'	Stadium: Lankaran City Stadium; Attendance: 3,500; Referee: Elvin Äsgärov

2 March 2016 Quarterfinal 1st leg	Khazar Lankaran	3 – 2	Neftchi Baku	Lankaran
14:00 AZT (UTC+4)	V.Gulaliyev 18'; T.Gurbatov 19'; V.Baybalayev (yellow card) 37'; I.Gadirzade 52'; B.Budagov (yellow card) 90+3'	Summary	Qurbanov 22'; F.Muradbayli 39'; Ramos (yellow card) 43'; E.Badalov (yellow card) 60'; A.Mammadov	Stadium: Lankaran City Stadium; Attendance: 4,500; Referee: Aliyar Ağayev

9 March 2016 Quarterfinal 2nd leg	Neftchi Baku	2 – 0 (4 – 3 agg.)	Khazar Lankaran	Baku
17:30 AZT (UTC+4)	Ramos (yellow card) 29'; Qurbanov 60' (pen.); A.Abdullayev 64' (yellow card) 87'	Summary	V.Baybalayev (yellow card) 40'; V.Gulaliyev (yellow card) 49'; Mammadov (yellow card) 59'	Stadium: Bakcell Arena; Attendance: 2,500; Referee: Rahim Həsənov

== Squad statistics ==
As of Match played 20 May 2016

=== Appearances and goals ===
No.	Pos	Nat	Player	Total		Premier League		Azerbaijan Cup	
No.	Pos	Nat	Player	Apps	Goals	Apps	Goals	Apps	Goals
1	GK	(Azerbaijan) AZE	Orkhan Sadıqlı	34	0	30+1	0	3	0
4	DF	(Azerbaijan) AZE	Ruslan Jafarov	18	0	15+1	0	2	0
5	DF	(Azerbaijan) AZE	Farid Asadov	11	0	2+8	0	1	0
6	MF	(Azerbaijan) AZE	Asif Mirili	20	0	15+3	0	2	0
7	MF	(Azerbaijan) AZE	Orkhan Safiyaroglu	18	0	13+3	0	2	0
8	MF	(Azerbaijan) AZE	Vugar Bäybalayev	18	0	16	0	2	0
9	FW	(Azerbaijan) AZE	Bayram Budagov	15	1	6+7	1	1+1	0
10	FW	(Azerbaijan) AZE	Tural Gurbatov	16	3	14	2	2	1
12	MF	(Azerbaijan) AZE	Ilyas Safarzade	24	0	17+6	0	0+1	0
15	DF	(Azerbaijan) AZE	Nodar Mammadov	17	0	15	0	2	0
16	MF	(Azerbaijan) AZE	Ibragim Gadirzade	19	2	15+2	1	2	1
17	MF	(Azerbaijan) AZE	Vaguf Gulaliyev	18	2	16	1	2	1
18	MF	(Azerbaijan) AZE	Tural Jalilov	38	0	35	0	3	0
25	GK	(Azerbaijan) AZE	Tarlan Gasimzada	6	0	6	0	0	0
32	DF	(Azerbaijan) AZE	Zaman Mirzazade	34	1	22+10	1	2	0
35	FW	(Azerbaijan) AZE	Elfad Baləhmədov	16	0	6+9	0	0+1	0
41	FW	(Azerbaijan) AZE	Huseyn Khalilzade	9	0	5+3	0	0+1	0
42	MF	(Azerbaijan) AZE	Kamran Abdullazade	17	3	15+1	2	1	1
44	DF	(Azerbaijan) AZE	Yusif Hasanov	5	0	3+2	0	0	0
66	MF	(Azerbaijan) AZE	Kanan Həsənov	2	0	0+2	0	0	0
77	MF	(Azerbaijan) AZE	Ali Aliyev	4	0	0+3	0	0+1	0
79	FW	(Azerbaijan) AZE	Namig Gojayev	6	0	0+5	0	0+1	0
86	MF	(Azerbaijan) AZE	Xaqani Sadiqov	1	0	0+1	0	0	0
97	FW	(Azerbaijan) AZE	Elnur Jafarov	19	2	18	2	1	0
99	MF	(Azerbaijan) AZE	Mahsum Qambarli	32	0	20+11	0	1	0
Players away from Khazar Lankaran on loan:
Players who appeared for Khazar Lankaran no longer at the club:
3	DF	(Azerbaijan) AZE	Rasim Ramaldanov	7	0	7	0	0	0
7	MF	(Mali) MLI	Sadio Tounkara	9	1	7+2	1	0	0
8	MF	(Azerbaijan) AZE	Elshan Rzazade	17	1	16	1	1	0
9	FW	(Azerbaijan) AZE	Orkhan Aliyev	8	0	7+1	0	0	0
11	MF	(Azerbaijan) AZE	Kazım Kazımlı	18	0	16+1	0	1	0
14	MF	(Azerbaijan) AZE	Rahid Amirguliyev	19	4	18	4	1	0
27	DF	(Romania) ROU	Adrian Scarlatache	9	0	9	0	0	0
72	DF	(Azerbaijan) AZE	Elvin Mirzayev	15	0	12+2	0	1	0

=== Goal scorers ===
Place	Position	Nation	Number	Name	Premier League	Azerbaijan Cup	Total
1	MF	(Azerbaijan)	14	Rahid Amirguliyev	4	0	4
2	MF	(Azerbaijan)	42	Kamran Abdullazade	2	1	3
2	FW	(Azerbaijan)	10	Tural Gurbatov	2	1	3
4	FW	(Azerbaijan)	97	Elnur Jafarov	2	0	2
4	MF	(Azerbaijan)	17	Vaguf Gulaliyev	1	1	2
4	MF	(Azerbaijan)	16	Ibragim Gadirzade	1	1	2
7	MF	(Azerbaijan)	8	Elshan Rzazade	1	0	1
7	MF	(Mali)	7	Sadio Tounkara	1	0	1
7	DF	(Azerbaijan)	32	Zaman Mirzazade	1	0	1
7	FW	(Azerbaijan)	9	Bayram Budagov	1	0	1
				TOTALS	16	4	20

=== Disciplinary record ===
Number	Nation	Position	Name	Premier League		Azerbaijan Cup		Total	
Number	Nation	Position	Name	Yellow card	Red card	Yellow card	Red card	Yellow card	Red card
1	(Azerbaijan)	GK	Orkhan Sadıqlı	7	0	1	0	8	0
3	(Azerbaijan)	DF	Rasim Ramaldanov	2	0	0	0	2	0
4	(Azerbaijan)	DF	Ruslan Jafarov	3	1	0	0	3	1
5	(Azerbaijan)	MF	Farid Asadov	1	0	0	0	1	0
6	(Azerbaijan)	DF	Asif Mirili	2	0	0	0	2	0
7	(Mali)	MF	Sadio Tounkara	2	0	0	0	2	0
7	(Azerbaijan)	MF	Orkhan Safiyaroglu	2	0	0	0	2	0
8	(Azerbaijan)	MF	Elshan Rzazadä	5	2	1	0	6	2
8	(Azerbaijan)	MF	Vugar Bäybalayev	1	0	2	0	3	0
9	(Azerbaijan)	FW	Bayram Budagov	0	0	1	0	1	0
10	(Azerbaijan)	FW	Tural Gurbatov	2	0	0	0	2	0
12	(Azerbaijan)	MF	Ilyas Säfärzadä	4	0	0	0	4	0
14	(Azerbaijan)	MF	Rahid Amirguliyev	3	0	1	0	4	0
15	(Azerbaijan)	DF	Nodar Mammadov	5	0	1	0	6	0
16	(Azerbaijan)	MF	Ibragim Gadirzade	2	0	0	0	2	0
17	(Azerbaijan)	MF	Vaguf Gulaliyev	5	0	1	0	6	0
18	(Azerbaijan)	MF	Tural Jalilov	2	0	1	0	3	0
25	(Azerbaijan)	GK	Tarlan Gasimzada	1	0	0	0	1	0
27	(Romania)	DF	Adrian Scarlatache	6	2	0	0	6	2
32	(Azerbaijan)	DF	Zaman Mirzazade	1	0	0	0	1	0
35	(Azerbaijan)	FW	Elfad Baləhmədov	1	0	0	0	1	0
41	(Azerbaijan)	FW	Hüseyn Xəlilzadə	1	0	0	0	1	0
42	(Azerbaijan)	MF	Kamran Abdullazade	3	0	1	0	4	0
72	(Azerbaijan)	DF	Elvin Mirzəyev	2	0	0	0	2	0
97	(Azerbaijan)	FW	Elnur Jafarov	2	0	0	0	2	0
99	(Azerbaijan)	MF	Mahsum Qambarli	1	0	0	0	1	0
			TOTALS	66	5	10	0	76	5

== Notes ==
- Qarabağ have played their home games at the Tofiq Bahramov Stadium since 1993 due to the ongoing situation in Quzanlı.
