= Melvin King =

Melvin King may refer to:

- Mel King (born 1928), American politician, community organizer and writer
- Melvin King (footballer) (born 1985), Liberian football goalkeeper
