= List of Azerbaijan football transfers winter 2015–16 =

This is a list of Azerbaijan football transfers in the winter transfer window 2016 by club. Only clubs of the 2015–16 Azerbaijan Premier League are included.

== Azerbaijan Premier League 2015-16 ==
=== AZAL ===
In: Note: Flags indicate national team as defined under FIFA eligibility rules; some limited exceptions apply. Players may hold more than one non-FIFA nationality.

| No. | Pos. | Nation | Player |
|---|---|---|---|
| 12 | FW | AZE | Ziyabil Mammadov (from (Azerbaijan) Kapaz) |
| 18 | DF | AZE | Eltun Huseynov (from (Azerbaijan) Baku, previously on loan to Zira) |
| 23 | MF | AZE | Haji Ahmadov (from (Azerbaijan) Zira) |
| 56 | MF | AZE | Rustam Rustamli (from (Azerbaijan) Baku) |
| 77 | MF | USA | Adan Coronado (from (Germany) BSV Schwarz-Weiß Rehden) |
| 88 | FW | AZE | Mirzaga Huseynpur (from (Azerbaijan) Sumgayit) |

Out: Note: Flags indicate national team as defined under FIFA eligibility rules; some limited exceptions apply. Players may hold more than one non-FIFA nationality.

| No. | Pos. | Nation | Player |
|---|---|---|---|
| 28 | MF | AZE | Mushfig Teymurov (loan return to (Azerbaijan) Gabala) |

=== Gabala ===
In: Note: Flags indicate national team as defined under FIFA eligibility rules; some limited exceptions apply. Players may hold more than one non-FIFA nationality.

| No. | Pos. | Nation | Player |
|---|---|---|---|
| 5 | DF | AZE | Pavlo Pashayev (from (Ukraine) Metalurh Zaporizhya) |
| 32 | FW | AZE | Rashad Eyyubov (from (Azerbaijan) Kapaz) |

Out: Note: Flags indicate national team as defined under FIFA eligibility rules; some limited exceptions apply. Players may hold more than one non-FIFA nationality.

| No. | Pos. | Nation | Player |
|---|---|---|---|
| 5 | MF | ROU | George Florescu (to (Cyprus) Omonia) |
| 17 | FW | AZE | Vüqar Nadirov (to (Azerbaijan) Inter Baku) |
| 32 | FW | ARG | Facundo Pereyra (loan return to (Greece) PAOK) |
| 70 | FW | AZE | Vagif Javadov (loan return to (Azerbaijan) Khazar Lankaran) |
| 88 | MF | PAR | David Meza (to (Paraguay) Cerro Porteño) |
| — | MF | AZE | Mushfig Teymurov (to (Azerbaijan) Shamkir, previously on loan to (Azerbaijan) AZAL) |

=== Inter Baku ===
In: Note: Flags indicate national team as defined under FIFA eligibility rules; some limited exceptions apply. Players may hold more than one non-FIFA nationality.

| No. | Pos. | Nation | Player |
|---|---|---|---|
| 1 | GK | AZE | Kamran Aghayev (from (Turkey) Karşıyaka) |
| 9 | FW | AZE | Gara Garayev (from (Spain) Málaga) |
| 17 | FW | AZE | Vüqar Nadirov (from (Azerbaijan) Gabala) |
| 23 | MF | PAR | César Meza Colli (Free agent) |

Out: Note: Flags indicate national team as defined under FIFA eligibility rules; some limited exceptions apply. Players may hold more than one non-FIFA nationality.

| No. | Pos. | Nation | Player |
|---|---|---|---|
| 1 | GK | AZE | Salahat Aghayev (to (Azerbaijan) Sumgayit) |
| 3 | DF | ESP | Juan Francisco (to (Spain) Castellón) |
| 9 | FW | FRA | L'Imam Seydi (to (Malta) Birkirkara) |
| 15 | MF | CRO | Stjepan Poljak (to (Croatia) Zagorec Krapina) |
| 23 | FW | BRA | Dhiego Martins (to (Hong Kong) Pegasus) |
| 44 | DF | ESP | Iván Benítez |
| 77 | MF | ALB | Emiljano Vila (to (Albania) Partizani Tirana) |
| 88 | MF | AZE | Abdulla Abatsiyev (to (Russia) Torpedo Armavir) |
| — | FW | AZE | Tural Gurbatov (loan to (Azerbaijan) Khazar Lankaran, previously on loan to (Azerbaijan) Ravan Baku) |

=== Kapaz ===
In: Note: Flags indicate national team as defined under FIFA eligibility rules; some limited exceptions apply. Players may hold more than one non-FIFA nationality.

| No. | Pos. | Nation | Player |
|---|---|---|---|
| 9 | MF | AZE | Namig Alasgarov (loan from (Azerbaijan) Qarabağ) |
| 19 | FW | AZE | Orkhan Aliyev (loan from (Azerbaijan) MOIK Baku) |

Out: Note: Flags indicate national team as defined under FIFA eligibility rules; some limited exceptions apply. Players may hold more than one non-FIFA nationality.

| No. | Pos. | Nation | Player |
|---|---|---|---|
| 9 | MF | AZE | Murad Aghakishiyev |
| 19 | FW | UKR | Oleksandr Sytnik (to (Ukraine) Hirnyk) |
| 68 | FW | AZE | Rashad Eyyubov (to (Azerbaijan) Gabala) |
| 77 | FW | AZE | Ziyabil Mammadov (to (Azerbaijan) AZAL) |

=== Khazar Lankaran ===
In: Note: Flags indicate national team as defined under FIFA eligibility rules; some limited exceptions apply. Players may hold more than one non-FIFA nationality.

| No. | Pos. | Nation | Player |
|---|---|---|---|
| 4 | DF | AZE | Ruslan Jafarov (from (Azerbaijan) Zira) |
| 6 | MF | AZE | Asif Mirili (Free agent) |
| 7 | MF | AZE | Orkhan Safiyaroglu (from (Azerbaijan) Bakili) |
| 8 | DF | AZE | Vugar Baybalayev (from (Azerbaijan) Ravan Baku) |
| 9 | FW | AZE | Bayram Budagov (Free agent) |
| 10 | FW | AZE | Tural Gurbatov (loan from (Azerbaijan) Inter Baku) |
| 15 | DF | AZE | Nodar Mammadov (from (Azerbaijan) Sumgayit) |
| 17 | MF | AZE | Vaguf Gulaliyev (from (Azerbaijan) Neftchala) |

Out: Note: Flags indicate national team as defined under FIFA eligibility rules; some limited exceptions apply. Players may hold more than one non-FIFA nationality.

| No. | Pos. | Nation | Player |
|---|---|---|---|
| 3 | DF | AZE | Rasim Ramaldanov (to (Azerbaijan) Sumgayit) |
| 7 | MF | MLI | Sadio Tounkara (to (Cyprus) Enosis Neon Paralimni) |
| 8 | MF | AZE | Elshan Rzazade (to (Azerbaijan) Neftchi Baku) |
| 9 | FW | AZE | Orkhan Aliyev (to (Azerbaijan) MOIK Baku) |
| 11 | FW | AZE | Kazim Kazimli (to (Azerbaijan) Turan) |
| 14 | MF | AZE | Rahid Amirguliyev (to (Azerbaijan) Qarabağ) |
| 21 | GK | POL | Paweł Kapsa (to (Poland) Miedź Legnica) |
| 27 | DF | ROU | Adrian Scarlatache (to (Romania) Astra Giurgiu) |
| 72 | DF | AZE | Elvin Mirzayev (to (Azerbaijan) Turan) |
| — | FW | AZE | Vagif Javadov (to (Azerbaijan) Sumgayit, previously on loan to (Azerbaijan) Gabala) |

=== Neftchi Baku ===
In: Note: Flags indicate national team as defined under FIFA eligibility rules; some limited exceptions apply. Players may hold more than one non-FIFA nationality.

| No. | Pos. | Nation | Player |
|---|---|---|---|
| 9 | FW | CHI | Nicolás Canales (from (Russia) Krylia Sovetov) |
| 18 | MF | AZE | Elshan Rzazade (from (Azerbaijan) Khazar Lankaran) |
| 72 | DF | AZE | Bilal Abbaszade (from (Azerbaijan) Qarabağ) |

Out: Note: Flags indicate national team as defined under FIFA eligibility rules; some limited exceptions apply. Players may hold more than one non-FIFA nationality.

| No. | Pos. | Nation | Player |
|---|---|---|---|
| 16 | DF | AZE | Aziz Guliyev (to (Azerbaijan) Ravan Baku) |
| 18 | MF | BRA | Cauê (to (Israel) Hapoel Tel Aviv) |
| 21 | MF | AZE | Samir Masimov (to (Slovenia) Domžale) |
| 22 | FW | AZE | Mirabdulla Abbasov (loan to (Latvia) Daugavpils) |
| 24 | GK | SVK | Michal Peškovič |
| 88 | MF | AZE | Orkhan Gurbanli (loan to (Latvia) Daugavpils) |
| — | GK | AZE | Ruzi Giyasli (loan to (Azerbaijan) Qaradağ Lokbatan, previously on loan to (Azerbaijan) Ağsu) |

=== Qarabağ ===
In: Note: Flags indicate national team as defined under FIFA eligibility rules; some limited exceptions apply. Players may hold more than one non-FIFA nationality.

| No. | Pos. | Nation | Player |
|---|---|---|---|
| 15 | MF | AZE | Rahid Amirguliyev (from (Azerbaijan) Khazar Lankaran) |
| 23 | DF | AZE | Elgun Ulukhanov (from (Russia) Krasnodar) |
| 63 | GK | AZE | Shahruddin Mahammadaliyev (from (Azerbaijan) Sumgayit) |
| 99 | MF | MKD | Muarem Muarem (from (Turkey) Eskişehirspor) |

Out: Note: Flags indicate national team as defined under FIFA eligibility rules; some limited exceptions apply. Players may hold more than one non-FIFA nationality.

| No. | Pos. | Nation | Player |
|---|---|---|---|
| 6 | MF | AZE | Vugar Mustafayev (loan to (Azerbaijan) Zira) |
| 11 | MF | AZE | Elvin Mammadov (to (Azerbaijan) Zira) |
| 23 | DF | MKD | Vladimir Dimitrovski (to (Czech Republic) Teplice) |
| 29 | FW | NED | Rydell Poepon (to (Netherlands) Roda JC) |
| 45 | DF | AZE | Bilal Abbaszade (to (Azerbaijan) Neftchi Baku) |
| 70 | MF | BRA | Chumbinho (to (Greece) Atromitos) |
| 99 | MF | AZE | Namig Alasgarov (loan to (Azerbaijan) Kapaz) |

=== Ravan Baku ===
In: Note: Flags indicate national team as defined under FIFA eligibility rules; some limited exceptions apply. Players may hold more than one non-FIFA nationality.

| No. | Pos. | Nation | Player |
|---|---|---|---|
| 5 | MF | AZE | Mirkamil Hashimli (from (Azerbaijan) Zira) |
| 9 | MF | AZE | Nuran Gurbanov (from (Azerbaijan) Sumgayit) |
| 11 | MF | AZE | Elnur Abdulov (from (Azerbaijan) Sumgayit) |
| 12 | GK | AZE | Elchin Sadigov (Free agent) |
| 22 | DF | AZE | Elmin Aghayev (from (Azerbaijan) Sharurspor) |
| 86 | FW | UKR | Yasyn Khamid (Free agent) |
| 99 | MF | AZE | Aziz Huseynov (from (Azerbaijan) Shamkir) |

Out: Note: Flags indicate national team as defined under FIFA eligibility rules; some limited exceptions apply. Players may hold more than one non-FIFA nationality.

| No. | Pos. | Nation | Player |
|---|---|---|---|
| 6 | DF | AZE | Vugar Baybalayev (to (Azerbaijan) Khazar Lankaran) |
| 11 | DF | SLE | Sheriff Suma |
| 19 | FW | AZE | Tural Gurbatov (loan return to (Azerbaijan) Inter Baku) |
| 20 | MF | AZE | Kanan Manafov (to (Azerbaijan) Sumgayit) |
| 22 | FW | AZE | Mahammad Aliyev |
| 32 | GK | UKR | Kostyantyn Makhnovskyi (to (Ukraine) Sumy) |
| 77 | MF | AZE | Javad Kazimov (to (Azerbaijan) Neftchala) |
| 86 | FW | AZE | Farid Guliyev (to (Turkey) Yozgatspor) |
| 88 | MF | AZE | Roini Ismayilov (to (Azerbaijan) Neftchala) |
| 99 | MF | AZE | Nijat Mukhtarov (to (Azerbaijan) Sumgayit) |

=== Sumgayit ===
In: Note: Flags indicate national team as defined under FIFA eligibility rules; some limited exceptions apply. Players may hold more than one non-FIFA nationality.

| No. | Pos. | Nation | Player |
|---|---|---|---|
| 1 | GK | AZE | Salahat Aghayev (from (Azerbaijan) Inter Baku) |
| 8 | MF | AZE | Nijat Mukhtarov (from (Azerbaijan) Ravan Baku) |
| 16 | MF | AZE | Kanan Manafov (from (Azerbaijan) Ravan Baku) |
| 23 | MF | AZE | Ilgar Huseynov (from (Azerbaijan) Zira) |
| 70 | FW | AZE | Vagif Javadov (from (Azerbaijan) Khazar Lankaran) |
| 99 | DF | AZE | Rasim Ramaldanov (from (Azerbaijan) Khazar Lankaran) |

Out: Note: Flags indicate national team as defined under FIFA eligibility rules; some limited exceptions apply. Players may hold more than one non-FIFA nationality.

| No. | Pos. | Nation | Player |
|---|---|---|---|
| 1 | GK | AZE | Shahruddin Mahammadaliyev (to (Azerbaijan) Qarabağ) |
| 8 | MF | AZE | Nuran Gurbanov (to (Azerbaijan) Ravan Baku) |
| 9 | MF | AZE | Mirzaga Huseynpur (to (Azerbaijan) AZAL) |
| 15 | DF | AZE | Nodar Mammadov (to (Azerbaijan) Khazar Lankaran) |
| 16 | MF | AZE | Elnur Abdulov (to (Azerbaijan) Ravan Baku) |
| 77 | MF | AZE | Fuad Mammadzade (to (Azerbaijan) MOIK Baku) |

=== Zira ===
In: Note: Flags indicate national team as defined under FIFA eligibility rules; some limited exceptions apply. Players may hold more than one non-FIFA nationality.

| No. | Pos. | Nation | Player |
|---|---|---|---|
| 6 | MF | AZE | Vugar Mustafayev (loan from (Azerbaijan) Qarabağ) |
| 60 | MF | AZE | Elvin Mammadov (from (Azerbaijan) Qarabağ) |

Out: Note: Flags indicate national team as defined under FIFA eligibility rules; some limited exceptions apply. Players may hold more than one non-FIFA nationality.

| No. | Pos. | Nation | Player |
|---|---|---|---|
| 4 | DF | AZE | Ruslan Jafarov (to (Azerbaijan) Khazar Lankaran) |
| 6 | MF | AZE | Haji Ahmadov (to (Azerbaijan) AZAL) |
| 7 | FW | CUW | Rihairo Meulens |
| 23 | DF | AZE | Eltun Huseynov (loan return to Baku) |
| 55 | MF | AZE | Ilgar Huseynov (to (Azerbaijan) Sumgayit) |
| 66 | FW | BRA | Eduardo (to (Indonesia) Persegres Gresik United) |
| 70 | MF | AZE | Mirkamil Hashimli (to (Azerbaijan) Ravan Baku) |
