= Dukuly =

Dukuly or Dukule’O is a portuguese surname. Notable people with the surname include:

- Neymar Dukuly, journalist
- Abraham Dukuly (born 2000), Ghanaian-Canadian soccer player
- Chris Dukuly (born 1991), football player
- Momolu Dukuly (1903–1980), politician
- Danielle Dukuly (born 2008), girl
