= 2015–16 AZAL PFC season =

AZAL
2015–16 season
- President: Zaur Akhundov
- Manager: Tarlan Ahmadov
- Stadium: AZAL Arena
- Premier League: 7th
- Azerbaijan Cup: Second Round vs Zira
- Top goalscorer: League: Nugzar Kvirtia (7); All: Nugzar Kvirtia (7)

The AZAL PFK 2015–16 season is AZAL's eleventh Azerbaijan Premier League season, and twelfth season in their history. It is their second full season with Tarlan Ahmadov as manager, during which they will participate in the Azerbaijan Cup as well as the League.

== Squad ==
As of 31 January 2016

Note: Flags indicate national team as defined under FIFA eligibility rules; some limited exceptions apply. Players may hold more than one non-FIFA nationality.

No.	Pos.	Nation	Player
1	GK	AZE	Amil Agajanov
2	DF	AZE	Rail Malikov
3	DF	AZE	Tural Hümbätov
4	DF	AZE	Qvanzav Məhəmmədov
5	DF	AZE	Kamil Huseynov
6	MF	AZE	Tagim Novruzov
7	MF	AZE	Tarlan Khalilov
8	MF	AZE	Seymur Asadov (captain)
9	DF	AZE	Aydin Gasimov
10	MF	GEO	Nugzar Kvirtia
11	FW	AZE	Ruslan Nasirli
12	FW	AZE	Ziyabil Mammadov
14	DF	AZE	Ilgar Alakbarov
15	FW	AZE	Rufat Musayev

No.	Pos.	Nation	Player
16	GK	MDA	Stanislav Namașco
17	FW	AZE	Elmin Chobanov
18	DF	AZE	Eltun Huseynov
19	FW	AZE	Mahammad Badalbayli
20	MF	AZE	Ismayil Ibrahimli
21	MF	AZE	Murad Sattarli
22	MF	AZE	Kamal Mirzayev
23	MF	AZE	Haji Ahmadov
24	DF	AZE	Emin Jafarguliyev
27	MF	GEO	Aleksandre Guruli
56	MF	AZE	Rustam Rustamli
77	MF	USA	Adan Coronado
88	FW	AZE	Mirzaga Huseynpur
95	GK	AZE	Polad Mirzazade

== Transfers ==
=== Summer ===
In: Note: Flags indicate national team as defined under FIFA eligibility rules; some limited exceptions apply. Players may hold more than one non-FIFA nationality.

No.	Pos.	Nation	Player
1	GK	AZE	Amil Agajanov (from (Azerbaijan) Simurq)
2	DF	AZE	Rail Malikov (from (Turkey) Denizlispor)
3	DF	AZE	Tural Hümbätov (from (Azerbaijan) Inter Baku)
4	DF	AZE	Qvanzav Məhəmmədov (from (Azerbaijan) Baku)
5	DF	AZE	Kamil Huseynov
6	MF	AZE	Tagim Novruzov
7	MF	AZE	Tarlan Khalilov (from (Azerbaijan) Shusha FK)
10	MF	GEO	Nugzar Kvirtia (from (Tunisia) ES Zarzis)
14	DF	AZE	Ilgar Alakbarov (from (Azerbaijan) Khazar Lankaran)
15	FW	AZE	Rufat Musayev (from (Azerbaijan) Neftchala FK)
17	FW	AZE	Elmin Chobanov (from (Azerbaijan) Neftchala FK)
19	FW	AZE	Mahammad Badalbayli (from (Azerbaijan) Neftchala FK)
21	MF	AZE	Murad Sattarli
24	DF	AZE	Emin Jafarguliyev (from (Azerbaijan) Shusha)
27	MF	GEO	Aleksandre Guruli (from (Georgia (country)) Samtredia)
28	MF	AZE	Mushfig Teymurov (from (Azerbaijan) Gabala)

Out: Note: Flags indicate national team as defined under FIFA eligibility rules; some limited exceptions apply. Players may hold more than one non-FIFA nationality.

No.	Pos.	Nation	Player
1	GK	AZE	Ruslan Majidov
3	DF	ESP	Juanfran (to (Azerbaijan) Inter Baku)
4	DF	GEO	Lasha Kasradze (to (Azerbaijan) Inter Baku)
5	DF	AZE	Karim Diniyev (to (Azerbaijan) Kapaz)
6	FW	BRA	Eduardo (to (Azerbaijan) Zira)
7	MF	AZE	Tamkin Khalilzade (loan return to (Azerbaijan) Qarabağ)
10	MF	AZE	Nijat Gurbanov (loan return to (Azerbaijan) Neftchi Baku)
12	MF	HON	Luis Ramos (to (Hungary) Nyíregyháza Spartacus)
13	MF	AZE	Shahriyar Rahimov (to (Azerbaijan) Kapaz)
15	DF	LAT	Oskars Kļava (to (Latvia) Liepājas Metalurgs)
16	DF	AZE	Orkhan Lalayev (loan return to (Azerbaijan) Ravan)
17	MF	NGR	Victor Igbekoi (to (Azerbaijan) Zira)
19	MF	AZE	Orkhan Safiyaroglu
20	FW	COD	Freddy Mombongo-Dues (to (Germany) Viktoria Köln)
21	DF	AZE	Novruz Mammadov (to (Azerbaijan) Inter Baku)
22	DF	AZE	Eltun Yagublu (loan return to (Azerbaijan) Qarabağ)
23	DF	AZE	Aleksandr Shemonayev (to (Azerbaijan) Zira)
24	MF	AZE	Azer Mammadov
25	MF	UKR	Valeriy Kutsenko (to (Ukraine) Chornomorets Odesa)
27	MF	AZE	Rashad Abdullayev (to (Azerbaijan) Zira)
85	GK	AZE	Kamal Bayramov (to (Azerbaijan) Zira)

=== Winter ===
In: Note: Flags indicate national team as defined under FIFA eligibility rules; some limited exceptions apply. Players may hold more than one non-FIFA nationality.

No.	Pos.	Nation	Player
12	FW	AZE	Ziyabil Mammadov (from (Azerbaijan) Kapaz)
18	DF	AZE	Eltun Huseynov (from (Azerbaijan) Baku, previously on loan to Zira)
23	MF	AZE	Haji Ahmadov (from (Azerbaijan) Zira)
56	MF	AZE	Rustam Rustamli (from (Azerbaijan) Baku)
77	MF	USA	Adan Coronado (from (Germany) BSV Schwarz-Weiß Rehden)
88	FW	AZE	Mirzaga Huseynpur (from (Azerbaijan) Sumgayit)
—	MF	UZB	Anvar Rakhimov (trial)

Out: Note: Flags indicate national team as defined under FIFA eligibility rules; some limited exceptions apply. Players may hold more than one non-FIFA nationality.

No.	Pos.	Nation	Player
28	MF	AZE	Mushfig Teymurov (loan return to (Azerbaijan) Gabala)

== Competitions ==
=== Azerbaijan Premier League ===
==== Results summary ====
Overall								Home						Away					
Pld	W	D	L	GF	GA	GD	Pts	W	D	L	GF	GA	GD	W	D	L	GF	GA	GD
36	13	7	16	24	36	−12	46	11	4	3	17	9	+8	2	3	13	7	27	−20

Last updated: 21 May 2016.
Source: Soccerway

==== Results ====
9 August 2015 1	Zira	1 – 0	AZAL	Baku
17:00 AZST (UTC+5)	V.Igbekoi 5'; A.Shemonayev (yellow card) 16'; S.Guliyev (yellow card) 71'	Report	T.Novruzov (yellow card) 8'; T.Xälilov (yellow card) 40'	Stadium: Zira Olympic Sport Complex Stadium; Attendance: 1,300; Referee: Orkhan Mämmädov

15 August 2015 2	AZAL	0 – 2	Gabala	Baku
21:00 AZST (UTC+5)	Malikov (yellow card) 45'; T. Hümbätov (yellow card) 48'; T. Novruzov (yellow card) 76'	Report	Gai 45+1'; Antonov 76'	Stadium: Dalga Arena; Attendance: 250; Referee: Fariz Yusifov

23 August 2015 3	AZAL	0 – 2	Qarabağ	Baku
21:00 AZST (UTC+5)	Malikov (yellow card) 22'; Jafarguliyev (yellow card) 27'; T.Hümbätov (yellow card) 57'	Summary	Mustafayev (yellow card) 41'; M.Mahir 44'; Quintana 65'	Stadium: Dalga Arena; Attendance: 450; Referee: Elvin Äsgärov

12 September 2015 4	Kapaz	1 – 0	AZAL	Ganja
16:00 AZST (UTC+5)	Dário 28' (yellow card) 42'; Sytnik (yellow card) 81'; T.Rzayev (yellow card) 85'	Report	Kvirtia (yellow card) 43'; Jafarguliyev (yellow card) 73'; K.Mirzayev (yellow card) 87'	Stadium: Ganja City Stadium; Attendance: 13,200; Referee: Fariz Yusifov

19 September 2015 5	AZAL	0 – 1	Inter Baku	Baku
21:00 AZST (UTC+5)	M.Teymurov (yellow card) 21'; Sattarli (yellow card) 64'; I.Alakbarov (yellow card) 88'	Report	Hajiyev 16' (yellow card) 65'; E.Abdullayev (yellow card) 88'	Stadium: AZAL Stadium; Attendance: 100; Referee: Ingilab Mämmädov

26 September 2015 6	Sumgayit	1 – 1	AZAL	Sumqayit
19:00 AZST (UTC+5)	B.Hasanalizade (yellow card) 29' (yellow-red card) 62'; A.Ramazanov 36'; Mammadov (yellow card) 62'; E.Mehdiyev (yellow card) 67'; S.Alkhasov (yellow card) 78'; M.Rahimov (yellow card) 83'; Guluzade (yellow card) 86'	Report	S.Asadov (yellow card) 35'; Guruli (yellow card) 78' (goal) 90+4'	Stadium: Kapital Bank Arena; Attendance: 1,000; Referee: Rahim Häsänov

2 October 2015 7	AZAL	1 – 0	Ravan Baku	Baku
19:00 AZST (UTC+5)	Kvirtia 7'; T.Novruzov (yellow card) 21'; I.Alakbarov (yellow card) 77'; Jafarguliyev (yellow card) 89'; Namașco (yellow card) 90+1'	Report	N.Mammadov (yellow card) 25'; Suma (yellow card) 61'; Y.Ağakärimzadä (yellow card) 78'	Stadium: AZAL Arena; Attendance: 300; Referee: Rauf Jabbarov

18 October 2015 8	Khazar Lankaran	2 – 1	AZAL	Lankaran
18:00 AZST (UTC+5)	K.Abdullazadä 19', 90'; Amirguliyev (yellow card) 49'; S.Tounkara 65'; E.Jäfärov (yellow card) 70'	Report	Sattarli 32'; I.Alakbarov (yellow card) 60'; Kvirtia (yellow card) 60'	Stadium: Lankaran City Stadium; Attendance: 5,000; Referee: Elvin Äsgärov

23 October 2015 9	AZAL	2 – 1	Neftchi Baku	Baku
18:00 AZST (UTC+5)	Kvirtia 24' (pen.) (yellow card) 24'; Malikov (yellow card) 26'; T.Novruzov (yellow card) 42'; Guruli 90+4' (pen.)	Report	K.Gurbanov (yellow card) 23'; Ailton (yellow card) 29'; Qurbanov 57'; R.Hajiyev (yellow card) 71'; Jairo (red card) 90+4'	Stadium: AZAL Arena; Attendance: 500; Referee: Ramil Diniyev

28 October 2015 10	Gabala	0 – 0	AZAL	Qabala
17:00 AZT (UTC+4)		Report	Kvirtia (yellow card) 68'; K.Mirzayev (yellow card) 83'; M.Teymurov (yellow card) 90'; Namașco (yellow card) 90+2'	Stadium: Gabala City Stadium; Attendance: 1,050; Referee: Ravan Hämzäzadä

31 October 2015 11	Qarabağ	2 – 0	AZAL	Baku
19:00 AZT (UTC+4)	Yunuszade (yellow card) 23'; Ismayilov 49'; Poepon 90+3'	Report	A.Gasimov (yellow card) 61'	Stadium: Tofiq Bahramov Stadium^{1} Attendance: 830; Referee: İnqilab Mämmädov

7 November 2015 12	AZAL	1 – 1	Kapaz	Baku
16:30 AZT (UTC+4)	Jafarguliyev (yellow card) 42'; T.Novruzov 88'; M.Badalbayli (yellow card) 90+2'	Report	S.Rahimov (yellow card) 39'; Ebah 82'; B.Soltanov (yellow card) 82'; T.Akhundov (yellow card) 83'; R.Eyyubov (yellow card) 90+1'	Stadium: AZAL Arena; Attendance: 400; Referee: Fariz Yusifov

23 November 2015 13	Inter Baku	2 – 0	AZAL	Baku
17:00 AZT (UTC+4)	Martins 30' (yellow card) 36'; Silva (yellow card) 56'; Khizanishvili (yellow card) 83'; A.Hüseynov 85'; Qirtimov (yellow card) 86'	Report	Məhəmmədov (yellow card) 45+1'	Stadium: Inter Arena; Attendance: 800; Referee: Ravan Hämzäzadä

28 November 2015 14	AZAL	2 – 0	Sumgayit	Baku
14:30 AZT (UTC+4)	Sattarli 20'; T.Novruzov (yellow card) 35'; R.Nasirli (yellow card) 37' (goal) 84'	Report	Fardjad-Azad (yellow card) 61'; T.Mikayilov (yellow card) 87'	Stadium: AZAL Arena; Attendance: 150; Referee: Aliyar Ağayev

7 December 2015 15	Ravan Baku	0 – 0	AZAL	Baku
20:00 AZT (UTC+4)	T.Gurbatov (yellow card) 37'; K.Muslumov (yellow card) 66'; Yunisoğlu (yellow card) 76'; C.Abdullayev (yellow card) 83'	Report	K.Mirzayev (yellow card) 26'; Malikov (yellow card) 55'	Stadium: Bayil Stadium; Attendance: 1,000; Referee: Rahim Häsänov

13 December 2015 16	AZAL	1 – 0	Khazar Lankaran	Baku
15:00 AZT (UTC+4)	A.Gasimov (yellow card) 34'; Sattarli 70'; T.Novruzov (yellow card) 73'	Report	E.Rzazadä (yellow card) 58'	Stadium: AZAL Arena; Attendance: 600; Referee: Rauf Jabbarov

17 December 2015 17	Neftchi Baku	0 – 1	AZAL	Baku
17:00 AZT (UTC+4)	Jairo (yellow card) 61'; Ramos (yellow card) 75'; Añete (yellow card) 90'	Report	R.Nasirli 29'; Sattarli (yellow card) 87'; K.Mirzayev (yellow card) 90+2'	Stadium: Bakcell Arena; Attendance: 1,000; Referee: Aliyar Ağayev

20 December 2015 18	AZAL	1 – 0	Zira	Baku
15:00 AZT (UTC+4)	T.Novruzov 14' (pen.); Sattarli (yellow card) 20'	Report	A.Nagiyev (yellow card) 13'; Krneta (yellow card) 53'; N.Gurbanov (yellow card) 90+1'	Stadium: AZAL Arena; Attendance: 356; Referee: Rahim Häsänov

31 January 2016 19	AZAL	1 – 0	Qarabağ	Baku
15:00 AZT (UTC+4)	Kvirtia 78'	Report	Richard (yellow card) 31'; Medvedev (yellow card) 35'; Guseynov (yellow card) 83'	Stadium: AZAL Arena; Attendance: 1,000; Referee: Rahim Hasanov

7 February 2016 20	Kapaz	2 – 0	AZAL	Ganja
13:30 AZT (UTC+4)	B.Nasirov 28' (yellow card) 85'; Ebah 86'	Report	T.Novruzov (yellow card) 32' (yellow-red card) 88'	Stadium: Ganja City Stadium; Attendance: 12,000; Referee: Ravan Hämzäzadä

13 February 2016 21	AZAL	0 – 0	Inter Baku	Baku
14:30 AZT (UTC+4)	Jafarguliyev (yellow card) 41'; T.Hümbätov (yellow card) 83'; I.Alakbarov (yellow card) 90'	Report		Stadium: AZAL Arena; Attendance: 300; Referee: Elvin Əsgərov

20 February 2016 22	Sumgayit	2 – 0	AZAL	Sumqayit
15:00 AZT (UTC+4)	Agayev 32'; Ramazanov 39' (yellow card) 49'	Report	Kvirtia (yellow card) 47'; T.Hümbätov (yellow card) 49'	Stadium: Kapital Bank Arena; Attendance: 1,500; Referee: Əliyar Ağayev

27 February 2016 23	AZAL	1 – 0	Ravan Baku	Baku
15:00 AZT (UTC+4)	Məhəmmədov (yellow card) 23' (yellow-red card) 51'; Kvirtia 61' (yellow card) 72'; Sattarli (yellow card) 81'; Namașco (yellow card) 90+2'	Report	Aliyev (yellow card) 32'; Yunisoğlu (yellow card) 54'; R.Azizli (yellow card) 79'	Stadium: AZAL Arena; Attendance: 300; Referee: Rauf Jabbarov

5 March 2016 24	Khazar Lankaran	0 – 1	AZAL	Lankaran
14:00 AZT (UTC+4)	T.Gurbatov (yellow card) 14'; Mammadov (yellow card) 35'	Report	Mirzaga Huseynpur (yellow card) 34'; Guruli 36' (pen.); K.Huseynov (yellow card) 65'; Kvirtia (yellow card) 69'; Coronado (yellow card) 88'	Stadium: Lankaran City Stadium; Attendance: 3,900; Referee: Orkhan Məmmədov

13 March 2016 25	AZAL	1 – 1	Neftchi Baku	Baku
15:00 AZT (UTC+4)	K.Mirzayev 41'; Guruli (yellow card) 45+3'	Report	Canales 41'	Stadium: AZAL Arena; Attendance: 300; Referee: Aliyar Ağayev

20 March 2016 26	Zira	4 – 2	AZAL	Baku
15:00 AZT (UTC+4)	Abdullayev 9'; Mammadov 58'; Krneta 81'; N.Novruzov 90+3'	Report	A.Gasimov 31'; R.Nasirli 70'; Coronado (yellow card) 87'; Malikov (yellow card) 89'	Stadium: Zira Olympic Sport Complex Stadium; Attendance: 700; Referee: Rahim Həsənov

30 March 2016 27	AZAL	2 – 1	Gabala	Baku
15:00 AZT (UTC+4)	K.Huseynov (yellow card) 5'; Malikov (yellow card) 36'; Jafarguliyev (yellow card) 43'; T.Hümbatov 54'; Sattarli 73'	Report	Gai 37' (pen.); Santos (yellow card) 65'; Abbasov (yellow card) 67'; Eyyubov (yellow card) 82'; Zec (yellow card) 84'	Stadium: AZAL Arena; Attendance: 400; Referee: Ingilab Məmmədov

3 April 2016 28	AZAL	3 – 0	Kapaz	Baku
15:00 AZT (UTC+4)	A.Gasimov 36'; Ahmadov 64'; Mirzaga Huseynpur 90+3' (pen.)	Report	Juninho (yellow card) 52' (yellow-red card) 90+3'; T.Akhundov (yellow card) 67'; K.Diniyev (yellow card) 73'; S.Aliyev (yellow card) 90+3'	Stadium: AZAL Arena; Attendance: 600; Referee: Fariz Yusifov

8 April 2016 29	Inter Baku	1 – 0	AZAL	Baku
17:00 AZT (UTC+4)	Meza (yellow card) 19'; Amirjanov (yellow card) 60'; Nadirov 64'	Report	T.Hümbätov (yellow card) 45+1'; Jafarguliyev (yellow card) 84'	Stadium: Inter Arena; Attendance: 300; Referee: Orkhan Məmmədov

16 April 2016 30	AZAL	1 – 0	Sumgayit	Baku
19:00 AZT (UTC+4)	T.Hümbätov (yellow card) 12' (goal) 39'; K.Huseynov (yellow card) 53'; Jafarguliyev (yellow card) 65'; Guruli (yellow card) 81'	Report	Javadov (yellow card) 61'; J.Hajiyev (yellow card) 62'; Chertoganov (yellow card) 84'; Aghayev (yellow card) 90+3'	Stadium: AZAL Arena; Attendance: 250; Referee: Fariz Yusifov

24 April 2016 31	Ravan Baku	1 – 0	AZAL	Baku
16:00 AZT (UTC+4)	Khamid 14'; H.Akhundov (yellow card) 55'; N.Gurbanov (yellow card) 80'	Report		Stadium: Bayil Stadium; Attendance: 300; Referee: Orkhan Məmmədov

30 April 2016 32	AZAL	1 – 0	Khazar Lankaran	Baku
17:30 AZT (UTC+4)	Kvirtia 54'; Coronado (yellow card) 64'	Report	R.Jafarov (yellow card) 27'; V.Gulaliyev (yellow card) 55'	Stadium: AZAL Arena; Attendance: 350; Referee: Ramil Diniyev

7 May 2016 33	Neftchi Baku	3 – 1	AZAL	Masazır
19:00 AZT (UTC+4)	Añete 16'; A.Abdullayev 24'; Ailton 44'; Ramos (yellow card) 56'; Kurbanov (yellow card) 90+3'	Report	Jafarguliyev (yellow card) 47'; Kvirtia 49'	Stadium: Alinja Arena; Attendance: 700; Referee: Rahim Həsənov

11 May 2016 34	AZAL	1 – 1	Zira	Baku
16:00 AZT (UTC+4)	T.Hümbätov (yellow card) 29'; Ahmadov (yellow card) 37'; Sattarli (yellow card) 64'; Kvirtia (yellow card) 68'; Jafarguliyev (yellow card) 70'	Report	A.Shemonayev (yellow card) 4'; Mutallimov (yellow card) 30'; Mustafayev (yellow card) 77'; V.Igbekoi 86'	Stadium: AZAL Arena; Attendance: 200; Referee: Elvin Asgərov

15 May 2016 35	Gabala	2 – 0	AZAL	Qabala
18:00 AZT (UTC+4)	A.Mammadov 21'; Vernydub (yellow card) 57'; Zec (yellow card) 79'; K.Huseynov 87' (o.g.); Stanković (yellow card) 90'	Report	Coronado (yellow card) 81'; Malikov (yellow card) 83'; Guruli (yellow card) 90'	Stadium: Gabala City Stadium; Attendance: 1,000; Referee: Revan Həmzəzadə

20 May 2016 36	Qarabağ	3 – 0	AZAL	Baku
19:00 AZT (UTC+4)	M.Mädätov 21'; Míchel 30'; Quintana 41'; Sadygov (yellow card) 68'	Report	K.Huseynov (yellow card) 27'; Jafarguliyev (yellow card) 29'	Stadium: Azersun Arena; Attendance: 3,500; Referee: Omar Paşayev

==== League table ====
Pos	Team	Pld	W	D	L	GF	GA	GD	Pts	Qualification or relegation
5	Kapaz	36	15	11	10	48	40	+8	56	Qualification for the Europa League first qualifying round
6	Neftçi Baku	36	13	10	13	41	41	0	49	Qualification for the Europa League first qualifying round
7	AZAL	36	13	7	16	26	38	−12	46	
8	Sumgayit	36	9	12	15	41	49	−8	39	
9	Ravan Baku	36	5	9	22	27	63	−36	18	

Source: PFL, UEFA, Soccerway
Rules for classification: 1) Points; 2) Head-to-head points; 3) Head-to-head goal difference; 4) Head-to-head goals scored; 5) Head-to-head away goals scored (only if two teams); 6) Goal difference; 7) Goals scored.

=== Azerbaijan Cup ===
2 December 2015 Second Round	AZAL	1 – 2	Zira	Baku
15:00 AZT (UTC+4)	T.Novruzov (yellow card) 17'; Jafarguliyev (red card) 60'; Guruli 90+2'	Summary	Bonilla 30', 87'; Mbah (yellow card) 50'	Stadium: AZAL Stadium; Attendance: 300; Referee: Fariz Yusifov

== Squad statistics ==
As of Match played 20 May 2016

=== Appearances and goals ===
No.	Pos	Nat	Player	Total		Premier League		Azerbaijan Cup	
No.	Pos	Nat	Player	Apps	Goals	Apps	Goals	Apps	Goals
1	GK	(Azerbaijan) AZE	Amil Agajanov	1	0	0	0	1	0
2	DF	(Azerbaijan) AZE	Rail Malikov	33	0	33	0	0	0
3	DF	(Azerbaijan) AZE	Tural Hümbätov	36	2	35	2	1	0
4	DF	(Azerbaijan) AZE	Qvanzav Məhəmmədov	20	0	16+4	0	0	0
5	DF	(Azerbaijan) AZE	Kamil Huseynov	21	0	18+2	0	1	0
6	MF	(Azerbaijan) AZE	Tagim Novruzov	22	2	20+1	2	1	0
7	MF	(Azerbaijan) AZE	Tarlan Khalilov	15	0	6+8	0	1	0
8	MF	(Azerbaijan) AZE	Seymur Asadov	6	0	6	0	0	0
9	DF	(Azerbaijan) AZE	Aydin Gasimov	25	2	20+4	2	0+1	0
10	MF	(Georgia (country)) GEO	Nugzar Kvirtia	33	7	23+10	7	0	0
11	FW	(Azerbaijan) AZE	Ruslan Nasirli	24	3	11+12	3	1	0
14	DF	(Azerbaijan) AZE	Ilgar Alakbarov	34	0	32+1	0	0+1	0
15	FW	(Azerbaijan) AZE	Rufat Musayev	1	0	0	0	1	0
16	GK	(Moldova) MDA	Stanislav Namașco	36	0	36	0	0	0
17	FW	(Azerbaijan) AZE	Elmin Chobanov	3	0	0+3	0	0	0
18	MF	(Azerbaijan) AZE	Eltun Hüseynov	1	0	1	0	0	0
19	FW	(Azerbaijan) AZE	Mahammad Badalbayli	31	0	7+23	0	1	0
20	MF	(Azerbaijan) AZE	Ismayil Ibrahimli	1	0	0+1	0	0	0
21	MF	(Azerbaijan) AZE	Murad Sattarli	31	4	30+1	4	0	0
22	MF	(Azerbaijan) AZE	Kamal Mirzayev	23	1	15+7	1	1	0
23	DF	(Azerbaijan) AZE	Haji Ahmadov	17	1	13+4	1	0	0
24	DF	(Azerbaijan) AZE	Emin Jafarguliyev	35	0	34	0	1	0
27	MF	(Georgia (country)) GEO	Aleksandre Guruli	26	4	19+6	3	0+1	1
42	DF	(Azerbaijan) AZE	Elsad Manafov	1	0	1	0	0	0
77	MF	(United States) USA	Adan Coronado	14	0	8+6	0	0	0
88	FW	(Azerbaijan) AZE	Mirzaga Huseynpur	11	1	9+2	1	0	0
Players who appeared for AZAL but left during the season:
28	MF	(Azerbaijan) AZE	Mushfig Teymurov	16	0	4+11	0	1	0

=== Goal scorers ===
Place	Position	Nation	Number	Name	Premier League	Azerbaijan Cup	Total
1	MF	(Georgia (country))	10	Nugzar Kvirtia	7	0	7
2	MF	(Azerbaijan)	21	Murad Sattarli	4	0	4
2	MF	(Georgia (country))	27	Aleksandre Guruli	3	1	4
4	FW	(Azerbaijan)	11	Ruslan Nasirli	3	0	3
5	MF	(Azerbaijan)	6	Tagim Novruzov	2	0	2
5	DF	(Azerbaijan)	9	Aydin Gasimov	2	0	2
5	DF	(Azerbaijan)	3	Tural Hümbätov	2	0	2
8	MF	(Azerbaijan)	22	Kamal Mirzayev	1	0	1
8	DF	(Azerbaijan)	23	Haji Ahmadov	1	0	1
8	FW	(Azerbaijan)	88	Mirzaga Huseynpur	1	0	1
				TOTALS	26	1	27

=== Disciplinary record ===
Number	Nation	Position	Name	Premier League		Azerbaijan Cup		Total	
Number	Nation	Position	Name	Yellow card	Red card	Yellow card	Red card	Yellow card	Red card
2	(Azerbaijan)	DF	Rail Malikov	7	0	0	0	7	0
3	(Azerbaijan)	DF	Tural Hümbätov	7	0	0	0	7	0
4	(Azerbaijan)	DF	Qvanzav Məhəmmədov	3	1	0	0	3	1
5	(Azerbaijan)	DF	Kamil Huseynov	4	0	0	0	4	0
6	(Azerbaijan)	MF	Tagim Novruzov	8	1	1	0	9	1
7	(Azerbaijan)	MF	Tarlan Khalilov	1	0	0	0	1	0
8	(Azerbaijan)	MF	Seymur Asadov	1	0	0	0	1	0
9	(Azerbaijan)	DF	Aydin Gasimov	2	0	0	0	2	0
10	(Georgia (country))	MF	Nugzar Kvirtia	7	0	0	0	7	0
11	(Azerbaijan)	FW	Ruslan Nasirli	1	0	0	0	1	0
14	(Azerbaijan)	MF	Ilgar Alakbarov	4	0	0	0	4	0
16	(Moldova)	GK	Stanislav Namașco	3	0	0	0	3	0
19	(Azerbaijan)	FW	Mahammad Badalbayli	1	0	0	0	1	0
21	(Azerbaijan)	MF	Murad Sattarli	5	0	0	0	5	0
22	(Azerbaijan)	MF	Kamal Mirzayev	4	0	0	0	4	0
23	(Azerbaijan)	DF	Haji Ahmadov	1	0	0	0	1	0
24	(Azerbaijan)	DF	Emin Jafarguliyev	11	0	0	1	11	1
27	(Georgia (country))	MF	Aleksandre Guruli	4	0	0	0	4	0
28	(Azerbaijan)	MF	Mushfig Teymurov	2	0	0	0	2	0
77	(United States)	MF	Adan Coronado	4	0	0	0	4	0
88	(Azerbaijan)	FW	Mirzaga Huseynpur	1	0	0	0	1	0
			TOTALS	81	2	1	1	82	3

== Notes ==
- Qarabağ have played their home games at the Tofiq Bahramov Stadium since 1993 due to the ongoing situation in Quzanlı.
