= Patrick Wleh =

Liberian footballer (born 1991)

Personal information
- Date of birth: 17 June 1991 (age 35)
- Place of birth: Monrovia, Liberia
- Height: 1.90 m (6 ft 3 in)
- Position: Forward

Youth career
- 2006–2008: Gedi & Sons

Senior career*
Years	Team	Apps	(Gls)
2007–2008	Gedi & Sons	31	(7)
2008–2009	Hapoel Petah Tikva		
2009–2011	LISCR Monrovia	56	(48)
2012	Sime Darby	20	(19)
2013–2017	PKNS	75	(45)
2016	→ Selangor (loan)	19	(9)
2018	Floriana	5	(0)
2019	PDRM	17	(2)
2020	Sarawak United	11	(5)

International career
2010–2013	Liberia U23	7	(6)
2011–2016	Liberia	14	(4)
- * Club domestic league appearances and goals

Patrick Wleh (born 17 June 1991) is a Liberian former professional footballer who played as a forward, spending most of his club career in Malaysia. At international level, he made 14 appearances for the Liberia national team scoring 4 goals.

== Career statistics ==
Appearances and goals by national team and year
National team	Year	Apps	Goals
Liberia	2011	4	2
Liberia	2012	5	1
Liberia	2013	3	1
Liberia	2014	–	
Liberia	2015	1	0
Liberia	2016	1	0
Total		14	4

Scores and results list Liberia's goal tally first, score column indicates score after each Wleh goal.

List of international goals scored by Patrick Wleh
No.	Date	Venue	Opponent	Score	Result	Competition
1	26 March 2011	Estádio da Várzea, Praia, Cape Verde	Cape Verde	1–2	2–4	2012 Africa Cup of Nations qualification
2	8 October 2011	Samuel Kanyon Doe Sports Complex, Monrovia, Liberia	Mali	2–2	2–2	2012 Africa Cup of Nations qualification
3	13 October 2012	U.J. Esuene Stadium, Calabar, Nigeria	Nigeria	1–5	1–6	2013 Africa Cup of Nations qualification
4	24 March 2013	Samuel Kanyon Doe Sports Complex, Monrovia, Liberia	Uganda	1–0	2–0	2014 FIFA World Cup qualification
