= Melvin King (footballer) =

Liberian footballer (born 1985)

Personal information
- Full name: Melvin Jalka King
- Date of birth: November 18, 1985 (age 40)
- Place of birth: Liberia
- Position: Goalkeeper

Senior career*
Years	Team	Apps	(Gls)
2002–2003	Busa		
2004	Shoes		
2005–2006	Gedi & Sons		
2006–2007	Séwé Sports de San Pedro		
2007–2009	Invincible Eleven		
2009–2012	Ashanti Gold		
2012	Sekondi Hasaacas F.C.		

International career
2007	Liberia	4	(0)
- * Club domestic league appearances and goals as of 13:42, 23 September 2008 (UTC)

Melvin Jalka King (born November 18, 1985) is a Liberian former footballer who last played for Sekondi Hasaacas

== Career ==
On 17 December 2008, King was banned for 5 months from all games due to doping.

== International ==
He was also a member of the Liberia national football team.
