= Elnur Jafarov =

Azerbaijani footballer (born 1997)

Personal information
- Full name: Elnur Mail oglu Jafarov
- Date of birth: 28 March 1997 (age 29)
- Place of birth: Lankaran, Azerbaijan
- Height: 1.68 m (5 ft 6 in)
- Position: Forward

Team information
- Current team: FC Shafa
- Number: 42

Youth career
- Khazar Lankaran

Senior career*
Years	Team	Apps	(Gls)
2012–2016	Khazar Lankaran	46	(3)
2016	Tondela	0	(0)
2016–2017	Dugopolje	13	(0)
2017–2018	Neftçi	9	(0)
2018	Keşla	3	(0)
2019–2021	Sumgayit	0	(0)
2021–2023	Qaradağ Lökbatan	9	(12)
2023–2024	Kapaz	15	(0)
2024	İmişli	11	(1)
2025–	FC Shafa	45	(8)

International career^{‡}
2012–2013	Azerbaijan U17	6	(1)
2014–2015	Azerbaijan U19	8	(0)
2015–2018	Azerbaijan U21	14	(4)
2015	Azerbaijan	1	(0)
Medal record
Men's football
Representing Azerbaijan
Islamic Solidarity Games
Winner	2017 Azerbaijan
- * Club domestic league appearances and goals as of 8 November 2026 ‡ National team caps and goals as of 8 November 2026

Elnur Jafarov (Azerbaijani: Elnur Mail oğlu Cəfərov; born 28 March 1997) is an Azerbaijani footballer who plays for and captains FC Shafa in Azerbaijan Premier League.

== Career ==
=== Club ===
Jafarov began his career with Khazar Lankaran, after developing through the youth system of the club. Elnur made his debut for Khazar Lankaran senior team at the age of 15 years 10 months in a 2-3 loss against Inter Baku. Elnur primarily played as an attacking winger, and earned 46 caps and 3 goals for Khazar Lankaran.

He transferred to C.D. Tondela in July 2016, however left the club after two months. Same month, Jafarov transferred to Dugopolje in the Croatian Second Football League for the 2016-17 season.

On 1 July 2017, Neftchi Baku announced the signing of Jafarov on a one-year contract. Elnur left the team at the end of the season.

On 28 July 2018, Jafarov signed a one-year contract with Keşla, but left the club by mutual consent on 28 December 2018. Over the next few seasons, Elnur Jafarov played in Azerbaijan Premier League, Reserves League and First League for clubs such as Sumgayit-2, Qaradağ Lökbatan, Kapaz and İmişli.

In January 2025, Jafarov moved to Shafa Baku FK in Azerbaijan Second League. Over the following two seasons, Jafarov contributed to Shafa gaining two consecutive league promotions, with 2nd place finish in the Second League in the 2024-25 season and championship in the Azerbaijan First League in the 2025-26 season. In October 2026, Jafarov scored a Premier League goal against Shamakhi, marking his first goal in top tier league of Azerbaijan after 11 years. The goal was later selected as the goal of the month by PFL.

=== International ===
On 13 October 2015, Jafarov made his senior international debut for Azerbaijan game against Bulgaria.

== Career statistics ==
As of match played 8 November 2026

Appearances and goals by club, season and competition
Club	Season	League			National Cup		Total	
Club	Season	Division	Apps	Goals	Apps	Goals	Apps	Goals
Khazar Lankaran	2012-13	Azerbaijan Premier League	2	0	0	0	2	0
Khazar Lankaran	2013-14	Azerbaijan Premier League	1	0	0	0	1	0
Khazar Lankaran	2014-15	Azerbaijan Premier League	25	1	2	0	27	1
Khazar Lankaran	2015-16	Azerbaijan Premier League	19	2	0	0	19	2
Dugopolje	2016-17	Croatian Second League	13	0	0	0	13	0
Neftchi Baku	2017-18	Azerbaijan Premier League	9	0	0	0	9	0
Keşla FK	2018-19	Azerbaijan Premier League	3	0	0	0	3	0
Kapaz PFK	2023-24	Azerbaijan Premier League	15	0	2	0	17	0
İmişli FK	2024-25	Azerbaijan First League	11	1	2	0	13	1
FC Shafa	2024-25	Azerbaijan Second League	13	3	0	0	13	3
FC Shafa	2025-26	Azerbaijan First League	25	4	1	0	26	4
FC Shafa	2026-27	Azerbaijan Premier League	7	1	0	0	7	1
Career total			143	12	7	0	150	12

=== International ===
Azerbaijan
Year	Apps	Goals
2015	1	0
Total	1	0

== Honours ==
=== Club ===
Khazar Lankaran

- Azerbaijan Supercup (1): 2013

Qaradağ Lökbatan

- Azerbaijan First League (1): 2021-22

FC Shafa

- Azerbaijan First League (1): 2025-26
- Azerbaijan Second League runner-up (1): 2024-25

=== International ===
Azerbaijan U23

- Islamic Solidarity Games: (1) 2017
