= Elshan Rzazade =

Azerbaijani footballer (born 1993)

Personal information
- Full name: Elshan Rashad oglu Rzazade
- Date of birth: 11 September 1993 (age 33)
- Place of birth: Lankaran, Azerbaijan
- Height: 1.82 m (6 ft 0 in)
- Position: Midfielder

Youth career
- 2012–2014: Baku

Senior career*
Years	Team	Apps	(Gls)
2014–2015	Khazar Lankaran	31	(1)
2016	Neftchi Baku	2	(0)
2016–2017	Mil-Muğan	0	(0)
2018	Shuvalan	1	(0)
2018–	Chilimli Belediyyespor	0	(0)

International career^{‡}
2015–2016	Azerbaijan	1	(0)
- * Club domestic league appearances and goals as of 17 February 2018 ‡ National team caps and goals as of 21 November 2015

Elshan Rashad oglu Rzazade (Azerbaijani: Elşən Rzazadə; born on 11 September 1993), is a former Azerbaijani football player.

== Career ==
=== Club ===
Elshan Rzazade began his career at Khazar Lankaran, where he played during the 2014-2015 and 2015–2016 seasons, appearing in a total of 31 matches. He scored once for the club during a match in the 2015-2016 Azerbaijan Premier League season against Sumgayit, equalizing the score at 1-1. In 2016, Khazar Lankaran put him up for transfer.

On 30 January 2016, Rzazade signed with Neftchi Baku. Due to an injury he sustained that year, he struggled to be included in the main squad and eventually left the club by mutual agreement. After leaving Neftchi Baku, he played for a while with Mil-Muğan in the Azerbaijan Cup, and later joined the Shuvalan club in the Azerbaijan First Division.

After 2018, he played for Çilimli Belediyespor in the Turkish Amateur League.

In 2024, a video has gone viral showing the retired footballer selling doner in London.

=== International ===
On 17 November 2015, Rzazade made his senior international debut for Azerbaijan game against Moldova.

== Career statistics ==
As of match played 10 April 2016

Appearances and goals by club, season and competition
Club	Season	League			National Cup		Total	
Club	Season	Division	Apps	Goals	Apps	Goals	Apps	Goals
Khazar Lankaran	2014–15	Azerbaijan Premier League	15	0	1	0	16	0
Khazar Lankaran	2015–16	Azerbaijan Premier League	16	1	1	0	17	1
Khazar Lankaran	Total		31	1	2	0	33	1
Neftchi Baku	2015–16	Azerbaijan Premier League	2	0	0	0	2	0
Career total			33	1	2	0	35	1

=== International ===
Azerbaijan
Year	Apps	Goals
2015	1	0
Total	1	0

Statistics accurate as of match played 17 November 2015
