= Nugzar Kvirtiya =

Georgian retired football player (born 1984)

Personal information
- Full name: Nugzar Valeryevich Kvirtiya
- Date of birth: 16 September 1984 (age 42)
- Place of birth: Tbilisi, Georgian SSR
- Height: 1.75 m (5 ft 9 in)
- Position: Midfielder

Youth career
- 1999–2001: Dinamo Tbilisi
- 2002: Spartak Moscow
- 2002–2003: Khimki-2

Senior career*
Years	Team	Apps	(Gls)
2004–2006	Zorky Krasnogorsk (amateur)	71	(23)
2007	Ryazan	18	(1)
2008	Zelenograd	30	(2)
2009	Znamya Truda Orekhovo-Zuyevo	12	(1)
2009–2012	AZAL	85	(6)
2012–2013	Turan-Tovuz	8	(0)
2013–2014	Guria Lanchkhuti	12	(0)
2014–2015	ES Zarzis	6	(0)
2015–2018	Shuvalan	86	(18)
- * Club domestic league appearances and goals

Nugzar Valeryevich Kvirtiya (Georgian: ნუგზარ ვალერის ძე კვირტია; born 16 September 1984) is a Georgian retired football player who played as a midfielder.

== Early life ==
Kvirtiya was born in Tbilisi on 16 September 1984. His father Valeriy Appolonovich Kvirtiya was a professional football player in Khobi, Squri, FC Guria Lanchkhuti and his mother is a cook. The family was forced to move from Georgia to Moscow because of the war in the country. The first steps in football began in the Russian FSHM school in the Luzhniki Stadium, two years became the winner of the Cup among his age.

== Club career ==
Kvirtia started his career in 2000 at FC Dinamo Tbilisi (Youth). When he return from Georgia to Russia, he tried to sign with FC Spartak Moscow (Youth), but due to injuries received in training could not recover in time and signed with FC Khimki.

=== FC Khimki ===
Kvirtiya joined FC Khimki in August 2002. In the Winter Cup semifinals came off the bench and scored two goals against Russian Premier League team FC Saturn, his team won 4-3 but in the final he couldn't get his first trophy with the team and they lost 0–1. He scored 3 goals in the second season for FC Khimki.

=== AZAL ===
On 7 July 2009, Kvirtiya signed a 2-year contract with AZAL PFC. Kvirtia made his Azerbaijan Premier League debut against Neftchi Baku on 16 August 2009. In his debut season, his team could not get into the top six. In the end of 2010, FC Gabala was interested in him but AZAL PFC didn't sell him.

The next season 2010/2011 for Kvirtia was one of the best; AZAL PFC get into the top six. In the quarter-final of the Azerbaijan Cup he scored at 43 minutes and AZAL PFC reached the semifinal. After a minor injury, he returned on 16 October 2010 as a substitute in the match against Inter Baku when the score was 0-0, he made an assist and then scored himself. AZAL PFC won at the defending champion 5–0. Kvirtiya become one of the best pass assistants in the team.

In the season 2010-2011 Kvirtiya helped his team to get into the qualifying round of the UEFA Europa League. On 30 July 2011 Kvirtiya made his debut in the UEFA Europa League against FC Minsk, when he came on as a substitute in the 71st minute. The first game ended with the score 1–1 in Baku. The second game was in Minsk and AZAL PFC lost 1-2 and flew out of the UEFA Europa League.

=== Turan Tovuz ===
Kvirtiya signed a one-year contract with the Azerbaijan team. Asker Abdullayev invited him in Turan Tovuz, who had worked with him in the 2009/2010 season in AZAL PFC. Abdulayev initiated Kvirtiya's move from Russia and he gave him the number 10 shirt in AZAL PFC, but in Turan PFC he played with number 25 because the shirt with number 10 was the captain of the team. On 23 September 2012 he played his first match in new team against Qarabağ FK. Kvirtiya bring some creative in Azerbaijan Premier League celebrating team goals with his teammates.

=== FC Guria ===
14 years have passed since the Kvirtiya playing at home in Georgia, he always wanted to return to his homeland, he signed a one-year contract with FC Guria Lanchkhuti (Umaglesi Liga), in 1980s in the Soviet Union, his father played for this team. On 2 March 2014 debuted in Georgian Umaglesi Liga against FC Tskhinvali he came on as a substitute in the 65th minute. His team get into the top six and they fought for a place in European competition. During the season 2013/2014 Tarlan Akhmedov head coach of Azerbaijan club AZAL PFC where Kvirtiya was played 3 season wanted to return him, but Kvirtiya moved to Tunisia

=== Esperance Sportive de Zarzis ===
On 7 August 2014 Kvirtiya signed a two-year contract with ES Zarzis, becoming the first Georgian professional footballer to play in the Tunisian Ligue Professionnelle 1 Kvirtia made his debut on 19 August 2014, coming on as a substitute in the 78th minute when the score was 0-0, and helped the team win the first match of the season away against CS Hammam-Lif 1–0.

=== AZAL ===
On 28 July Kvirtiya return to his former team AZAL, signing a one-year contract. He always wanted to come back in his "family team" as he called in all interviews. His first game in the season 2015/2016 was on 9 August against Zira FK. AZAL PFC started the season very badly, but on 2 October Kvirtiya scored his first goal in the championship against Ravan Baku FK and bring the first victory to AZAL PFC 1–0. His second goal scored against Neftchi Baku from the penalty spot and AZAL PFC won 2–1. In the season 2015/2016 Nugzar Kvirtiya became the teams's best scorer with 7 goals in Azerbaijan Premier League and one goal in CBC Sport Cup. Next season 2016/2017, Nugzar once again becomes the team's top scorer.

== Ambassador of Neymar Jr's Five ==
Nugzar Kvirtiya became the official ambassador of Neymar JR Five in Azerbaijan (2018). Nugzar received an official letter with an invitation from Red Bull in Azerbaijan to be the ambassador of the tournament "Neymar JR's Five". The winners in Baku will go to Brazil to compete in the world final and get a chance to play against the Paris Saint-Germain F.C. and the Brazil national football team player Neymar.

== KEY Leader Street Football / Frestyle Football ==
In 2018 after completing his career, Nugzar became the official Key Leader in Azerbaijan from the world association The World Freestyle Football Association (WFFA) and develops street football and soccer freestyle.

== UEFA EURO 2020 Freestyler ==
November 12, 2019 Nugzar Kvirtiya became the official freestyler of EURO 2020. He was among the 24 best freestylers in Europe and will represent the hostess of Baku city.

== Honours ==
Georgia

- Intercontinental Cup Winner - 2005 (Moscow)
- Intercontinental Cup Winner - 2006 (Moscow)

FC Zorky Krasnogorsk

- Russian Cup Winner - 2006

AZAL PFK

- Bronze medals - 2018

Individual

- Intercontinental Best Player - 2006

== Personal life ==
Nugzar has a sister, her name is Nino, father Valeriy and mother Rimma. Kvirtiya married on 4 June 2011 to the Azerbaijani model, Inna. They have a daughter, her name is Gabrielle.

== Clubs statistics ==
As of match played 23 April 2017

Appearances and goals by club, season and competition
Club	Season	League			National Cup		Continental		Other		Total	
Club	Season	Division	Apps	Goals	Apps	Goals	Apps	Goals	Apps	Goals	Apps	Goals
FC Zorky Krasnogorsk	2004–06	Russian Amateur Football League	71	23	2	2	—		3	2	76	27
FC Ryazan	2006–07	Russian Professional Football League	18	1	1	0	—		—		19	1
FC Zelenograd	2007–08	Russian Professional Football League	30	2	2	1	—		—		32	3
FC Znamya	2008–09	Russian Professional Football League	12	1	0	0	—		—		12	1
AZAL	2009–10	Azerbaijan Premier League	30	2	6	0	—		—		36	2
AZAL	2010–11	Azerbaijan Premier League	27	1	4	1	—		—		31	2
AZAL	2011–12	Azerbaijan Premier League	28	2	3	1	2	0	—		33	3
AZAL	Total		216	32	18	2	2	0	3	2	239	39
Turan Tovuz	2012–13	Azerbaijan Premier League	8	0	0	0	—		—		8	0
Guria Lanchkhuti	2013–14	Umaglesi Liga	12	0	0	0	—		—		12	0
ES Zarzis	2014–15	CLP-1	6	0	0	0	—		—		6	0
AZAL	2015–16	Azerbaijan Premier League	33	7	0	0	—		3	1	36	8
AZAL	2016–17	Azerbaijan Premier League	26	3	1	0	—		—		27	3
AZAL	Total		85	10	1	0	-	-	-	-	89	11
AZAL	2017–18	Azerbaijan First Division	27	8	1	0	—		—		28	8
Career total			328	50	20	4	2	0	6	3	356	58
