= Omega Roberts =

Liberian footballer (born 1989)

Personal information
- Full name: Omega Alamadine Roberts
- Date of birth: 12 December 1989 (age 36)
- Place of birth: Monrovia, Liberia
- Height: 1.92 m (6 ft 4 in)
- Position: Center back

Team information
- Current team: Radnički Kovin

Senior career*
Years	Team	Apps	(Gls)
2005–2006	Gedi & Sons	15	(0)
2007	Séwé Sports	19	(0)
2008–2009	Tiko United	21	(0)
2009	Diables Noirs	10	(0)
2009–2011	Olympique Bamako	39	(5)
2011–2012	Sloboda Užice	14	(0)
2012–2013	Smederevo	14	(0)
2013	Red Star Belgrade	2	(0)
2014	Mladost Podgorica	5	(0)
2014–2015	Borac Čačak	0	(0)
2015–2016	Donji Srem	14	(0)
2017	AZAL	5	(0)
2018	Žarkovo	12	(0)
2019	Novi Pazar	5	(0)
2020	Budućnost Dobanovci	1	(0)
2022	Donji Srem		
2025	Arandjelovac		

International career^{‡}
2006–2016	Liberia	8	(1)
- * Club domestic league appearances and goals as of 10 June 2020 ‡ National team caps and goals as of 10 June 2020

Omega Alamadine Roberts (born 12 December 1989) is a Liberian professional footballer who plays as a center back for Serbian club OFK Aranđelovac since 2025

== Club career ==
=== Early career ===
During his time at Gedi & Sons FC, a youthful club he helped to reach the promotion into the 2006 Liberian Premier League. His good displays along with the national team call, made him earn a move to Ivory Coast in early 2007 to play with Séwé Sports de San Pedro with whom he played in the 2007 CAF Champions League. After that season he moved to Cameroon in 2009 where he played with Tiko United being one of the most important players for the club in their historical achievement of winning the 2009 Cameroon Première Division. After that impressive season he played with Diables Noirs in the Republic of Congo in 2009 where, along with one national title, he also won the title of the best foreign player of the league. At end of 2009 he moved to Malian Club Olympique de Bamako where he played two seasons until 2011. During this period in Mali, he was nicknamed as the "Liberian Rio Ferdinand", due to his playing intelligence, technique, composure and physical structure. While playing with COB along his national teammate Melvin Kicmett, he won the Top Four Trophy in 2009 and the Malian Cup in 2011, along with another top continental competition presence by playing in the 2010 CAF Confederation Cup.

=== Sloboda Užice ===
In early August 2011 he arrived to Serbia to be on trial with FK Sloboda Užice ending up signing a definitive contract with the club on 24 August. this way achieving his longtime desire to achieve a move to Europe. His debut in official matches was on 21 September 2011, in a 2011–12 Serbian Cup match against FK Teleoptik, and his league debut was 3 days later, on 24 September, as a starter in a match of the round 6 against Javor.

=== Smederevo ===
In July 2012, Roberts moved to another Serbian SuperLiga side FK Smederevo on a free transfer. He made his competitive debut in the first round of the Serbian SuperLiga against FK Vojvodina in Novi Sad. He received a red card in the 69th minute. The match finished 0–0.

=== Red Star Belgrade ===
After terminating his contract with Smederevo, Omega joined Red Star Belgrade in June 2013. He made his competitive debut for Red Star on 25 September 2013, in a 3–0 victory away against FK Proleter Novi Sad in the Serbian Cup.

=== Donji Srem ===
After spells with FK Mladost Podgorica in the Montenegrin First League and FK Borac Čačak in Serbian SuperLiga, Omega joined Serbian First League side FK Donji Srem at the start of the 2015–16 season.

=== AZAL ===
Roberts went on trial with Azerbaijan Premier League team AZAL PFK in January 2017. He ended up joining the club.

== International career ==
He is also a member of the Liberia national football team. He made his international debut for his country in 2006, while only 16 years of age. He also played on the senior level in the 2008 Nations Cup qualifiers when a depleted Lone Star squad lost away to Equatorial Guinea 2–1.

In summer 2012, after a half season in Serbia where he was a regular with Sloboda, he received a new call and played on 10 June against Angola for the 2014 FIFA World Cup qualifications. A week afterward he played against Namibia for the 2013 Africa Cup of Nations qualifications. He scored his first goal for the national team on 8 September 2012 against Nigeria.

== Career statistics ==
Liberia national team
Year	Apps	Goals
2006	2	0
2007	0	0
2008	0	0
2009	0	0
2010	0	0
2011	0	0
2012	3	1
2013	2	0
2014	0	0
2015	0	0
2016	1	0
Total	8	0

Statistics accurate as of match played 29 March 2016

#	Date	Venue	Opponent	Score	Result	Competition	Ref.
1	8 September 2012	SKD Stadium, Paynesville, Liberia	Nigeria	1–0	2–2	2013 Africa Cup of Nations qualification	

== Honors ==
Tiko United

- Cameroon Première Division: 2008–09

Diables Noirs

- Congo Premier League: 2009

Olympique Bamako

- Malien Cup: 2011

Red Star Belgrade

- Serbian SuperLiga: 2013–14

OFK Titograd

- Montenegrin Cup runner-up: 2014

Individual

- Best foreign player of the Congo Premier League: 2009
