= Chris Dukuly =

Liberian footballer

Personal information
- Full name: Chris Sirleaf Dukuly
- Date of birth: November 15, 1991 (age 34)
- Place of birth: Liberia
- Height: 5 ft 9 in (1.75 m)
- Position: Midfielder

Senior career*
Years	Team	Apps	(Gls)
2003–2006	Gedi & Sons FC	?	(?)
2007–2008	Séwé FC	?	(?)
2009–2011	Gedi & Sons FC	?	(?)

International career
2005	Liberia	2	(0)
- * Club domestic league appearances and goals as of 13:42, 07 March 2008 (UTC)

Chris Sirleaf Dukuly (born November 15, 1985) is a Liberian footballer.

== International career ==
He has been capped twice for Liberia.
