= Arkadi Halperin =

Israeli-Russian footballer

Arkadi Halperin Аркадий Гальперин
Personal information
- Full name: Arkadi Halperin
- Date of birth: 21 May 1992 (age 34)
- Place of birth: Moscow, Russia
- Height: 1.75 m (5 ft 9 in)
- Position: Midfielder

Youth career
- Khimki
- Moscow
- Deportivo de La Coruña

Senior career*
Years	Team	Apps	(Gls)
2011–2013	Khimki	26	(1)
2013–2015	Academia Chișinău	35	(2)
2016	TSK Simferopol	3	(0)
2017	AZAL	13	(0)
2017	Hapoel Nazareth Illit	2	(0)
2017–2018	Maccabi Ironi Kiryat Ata	8	(1)
2019–2020	FC Shevardeni-1906 Tbilisi	0	(0)
- * Club domestic league appearances and goals

Arkadi Halperin (Russian: Аркадий Борисович Гальперин; born 21 May 1992) is an Israeli-Russian former professional association football player.

== Biography ==
=== Playing career ===
After seeing the pitch with FC Khimki in Russia, Halperin landed a trial at Olympique de Marseille in France. Halperin was later invited to join Israeli club, Maccabi Haifa, on trial where he would be eligible for an Israeli passport under the Law of Return. Upon completion of the trial period at Maccabi Haifa, Halperin was sent home without a contract offer. In January 2012, Halperin entered into negotiations with Maccabi Petah Tikva.

== Statistics ==
Club performance			League		Cup		League Cup		Continental		Total	
Season	Club	League	Apps	Goals	Apps	Goals	Apps	Goals	Apps	Goals	Apps	Goals
Russia			League		Russian Cup		League Cup		Europe		Total	
2009	FC Khimki	Championship	26	1	0	0	0	0	0	0	26	1
Career total			26	1	0	0	0	0	0	0	26	1
