= Franck Madou =

Ivorian footballer (born 1987)

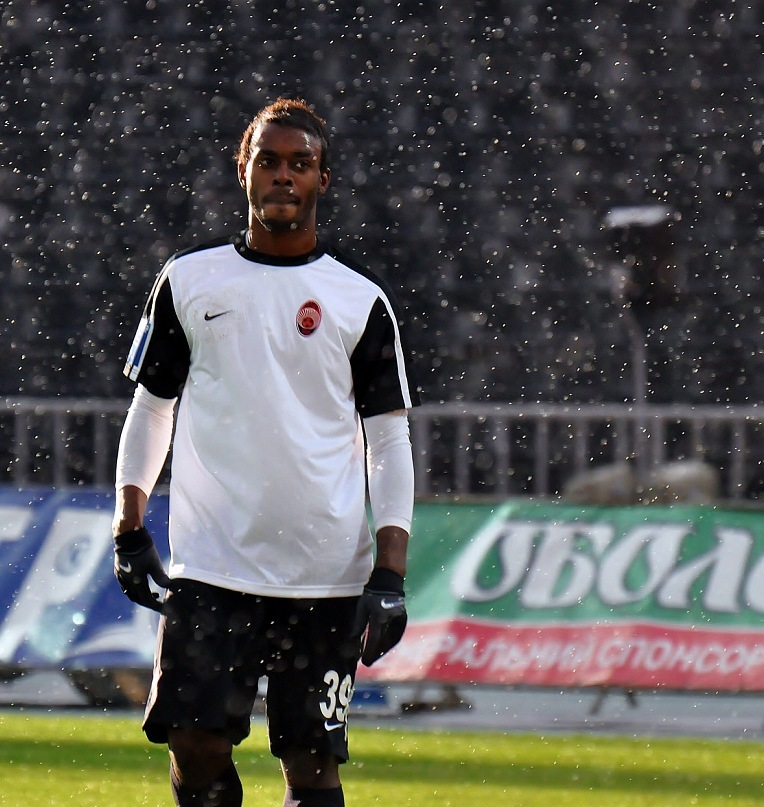
- Madou in April 2011

Personal information
- Full name: Franck-Olivier Madou
- Date of birth: 15 September 1987 (age 39)
- Place of birth: Marcory, Ivory Coast
- Height: 1.88 m (6 ft 2 in)
- Position: Forward

Senior career*
Years	Team	Apps	(Gls)
2005–2006	Toulouse	12	(1)
2006–2009	Young Boys	10	(4)
2008	→ Grasshopper (loan)	12	(6)
2008–2009	→ Biel-Bienne (loan)	28	(17)
2009–2010	Lausanne Sports	28	(8)
2010	APOP Kinyras	10	(7)
2011–2012	Zorya Luhansk	20	(11)
2012	Wil 1900	0	(0)
2013	Minyor Pernik	7	(5)
2013	ES Setif	14	(8)
2014	Al-Nasr	12	(8)
2014	Le Mont	12	(6)
2015	Fréjus Saint-Raphaël	15	(7)
2015–2016	Sainte-Geneviève Sports	19	(9)
2017	AZAL	8	(5)

International career
2006–2007	Ivory Coast U20	4	(3)
- * Club domestic league appearances and goals as of 1 September 2017

Franck-Olivier Madou (born 15 September 1987) is an Ivorian professional footballer who last played for AZAL PFK in the Azerbaijan Premier League.

== Early life ==
Born in Marcory, Madou moved with his parents to France when he was eighteen months old. He acquired French nationality on 7 December 2004, through the collective effect of his mother's naturalization.

== Career ==
Madou joined FC Toulouse in 2005. He was called in the reserve team and played his first professional league matches in the Championnat de France amateur.

In January 2006, Madou left Toulouse and signed his first professional contract for BSC Young Boys. He played only ten games, scoring one goal, and he left Young Boys on loan to Grasshopper Club Zürich in February 2008. After spending three months on loan at Grasshoppers, he moved to FC Biel-Bienne in the summer of 2008. Finally, he signed for Cypriot side APOP Kinyras.

In February 2017, Madou signed for AZAL PFK of the Azerbaijan Premier League.
