= Aleksandre Guruli =

Georgian footballer

Alexander Guruli
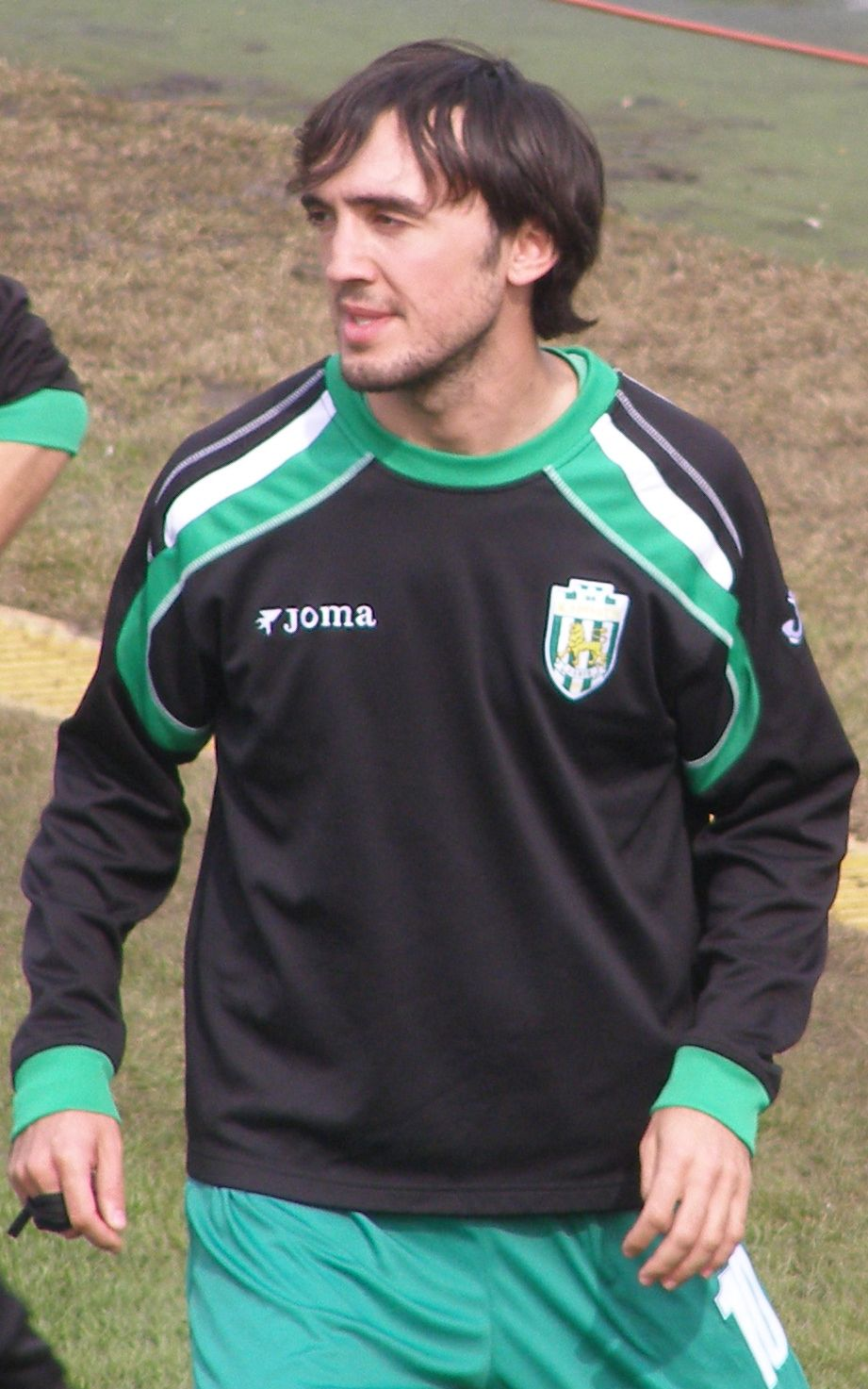

Personal information
- Date of birth: 9 November 1985 (age 41)
- Place of birth: Batumi, Georgian SSR
- Height: 1.78 m (5 ft 10 in)
- Position: Winger

Youth career
- Olympique Lyonnais

Senior career*
| Years | Team | Apps | (Gls) |
| 2003–2004 | Boulogne | 12 | (2) |
| 2004–2005 | Lyon II | 17 | (1) |
| 2005–2006 | Lyon-Duchère | 29 | (4) |
| 2006–2007 | Lesquin | 19 | (0) |
| 2007–2008 | Lyon-Duchère | | |
| 2008–2011 | Karpaty Lviv | 71 | (1) |
| 2012 | Dila Gori | 23 | (5) |
| 2013 | Dinamo Batumi | 8 | (3) |
| 2013 | Zestaponi | 11 | (0) |
| 2014 | Shakhtyor Soligorsk | 22 | (0) |
| 2015 | Samtredia | 8 | (0) |
| 2015–2016 | AZAL | 25 | (3) |
| 2016–2017 | Shukura Kobuleti | 43 | (5) |
| 2018 | Olympique Grande-Synthe | 2 | (0) |
| 2018–2023 | US Saint-Omer | | |

International career
| 2004–2006 | Georgia U21 | 4 | (1) |
| 2010–2012 | Georgia | 6 | (1) |
- * Club domestic league appearances and goals

Alexander Guruli (Georgian: ალექსანდრე გურული; born 9 November 1985) is a Georgian former professional footballer who played as a winger.

== Personal life ==
He is the son of Gija Guruli.

== Club career ==
He spent half of his career in France. Though he never play professional football there, he is the second of only a small number of Georgians to have played in Coupe de France, and both the youngest (at 18) and the oldest (at 35).

== Career statistics ==
Georgia
| Year | Apps | Goals |
|---|---|---|
| 2010 | 1 | 1 |
| 2011 | 2 | 0 |
| 2012 | 3 | 0 |
| Total | 6 | 1 |

Statistics accurate as of match played 14 November 2012

| # | Date | Venue | Opponent | Score | Result | Competition |
|---|---|---|---|---|---|---|
| 1 | 17 November 2010 | Bonifika Stadium, Koper, Slovenia | Slovenia | 1–1 | 1–2 | Friendly |
