= Gedi & Sons FC =

Liberian football club

Gedi & Sons
- Full name: Gedi & Sons Football Club
- Ground: Antonette Tubman Stadium; Monrovia, Liberia
- Capacity: 10,000
- Chairman: Patrick Garwo] manager = Christian Cole
- League: Liberian Premier League

Gedi & Sons Football Club is an association football club based in Monrovia, Liberia. Their home stadium is the Antonette Tubman Stadium.

The team colors are red, blue, and white.

== Current squad ==
Note: Flags indicate national team as defined under FIFA eligibility rules; some limited exceptions apply. Players may hold more than one non-FIFA nationality.

No.	Pos.	Nation	Player
—	GK	LBR	Chris Wesseh
—	DF	LBR	Mohammed Kamara
—	MF	LBR	Chris Dukuly
—	MF	LBR	Ambrose Wleh (deceased)

No.	Pos.	Nation	Player
—		LBR	Andrew Dorley
—		LBR	Jimmy Taylue
—		ZIM	Gogo Mbwenge
—		LBR	Teku Nah
