= 2013–14 Neftchi Baku PFK season =

Neftchi Baku
2013–14 season
- Chairman: Sadyg Sadygov
- Manager: Boyukagha Hajiyev until 25 July 2013; Tarlan Ahmadov; 26 July – 23 October 2013; Nazim Suleymanov from 25 October 2013 – 8 January 2014; Boyukagha Hajiyev; 11 January 2014
- Stadium: Bakcell Arena
- Premier League: 4th
- Azerbaijan Cup: Winners
- 2013 Azerbaijan Supercup: Runners-up
- Champions League: 2nd Qualifying Round vs Skënderbeu Korçë
- Top goalscorer: League: Bahodir Nasimov (7); All: Bahodir Nasimov (8)
- Highest home attendance: 10,200 vs Skënderbeu Korçë; 17 July 2013
- Lowest home attendance: 200 vs Simurq; 2 February 2014
- Average home league attendance: 2,009; 3 April 2014
Home colours	Away colours	Third colours

The Neftchi Baku 2013–14 season was Neftchi Baku's 22nd Azerbaijan Premier League season, and their fourth season under manager Boyukagha Hajiyev. Neftchi are the defending champions of the Azerbaijan Premier League and will also compete in the 2013–14 Azerbaijan Cup. They entered and were eliminated at the 2nd qualifying round of the UEFA Champions League by Skënderbeu Korçë of Albania. Following their elimination from the Champions League, Boyukagha Hajiyev resigned on 25 July 2013, and was replaced by Tarlan Ahmadov. Ahmadov was sacked as manager on 23 October 2013 following Neftchi's 2–1 defeat to Khazar Lankaran in the Azerbaijan Supercup. Nazim Suleymanov was appointed the club's manager on 25 October, but resigned on 8 January 2014 following a dispute over transfer fund, and Boyukagha Hajiyev returning as manager on 11 January.

== Squad ==
As of 23 May 2014

Note: Flags indicate national team as defined under FIFA eligibility rules; some limited exceptions apply. Players may hold more than one non-FIFA nationality.

No.	Pos.	Nation	Player
1	GK	LAT	Pāvels Doroševs
2	DF	BRA	Carlos Cardoso
3	DF	BRA	Denis Silva
4	DF	AZE	Tärlän Quliyev
5	DF	MKD	Igor Mitreski
6	MF	AZE	Rashad Sadiqov
7	MF	AZE	Araz Abdullayev
8	MF	AZE	Elshan Abdullayev
9	MF	BRA	Flavinho
10	MF	AZE	Javid Imamverdiyev
12	GK	AZE	Emil Balayev
13	MF	AZE	Vasif Aliyev
14	FW	UZB	Bahodir Nasimov
15	MF	PAR	Éric Ramos (loan from Rubio Ñu)
16	DF	BRA	Bruno Bertucci
17	MF	AZE	Nijat Gurbanov

No.	Pos.	Nation	Player
18	FW	AZE	Fahmin Muradbayli
19	MF	AZE	Mirhuseyn Seyidov
20	MF	AZE	Vurgun Farajzade
21	FW	AZE	Samir Masimov
22	DF	AZE	Mahir Shukurov (captain)
23	FW	AZE	Ruslan Qurbanov
24	GK	AZE	Ruzi Giyasli
26	FW	AZE	Javid Muxtarzade
27	DF	AZE	Magsad Isayev
28	MF	AZE	Emin Mehdiyev
29	MF	AZE	Agshin Gurbanli
30	GK	SRB	Saša Stamenković
32	DF	AZE	Elvin Yunuszade
33	MF	AZE	Orkhan Bashirov
90	FW	CMR	Ernest Nfor
95	DF	AZE	Elvin Badalov

=== Out on loan ===
Note: Flags indicate national team as defined under FIFA eligibility rules; some limited exceptions apply. Players may hold more than one non-FIFA nationality.

No.	Pos.	Nation	Player
10	MF	SLE	Julius Wobay (at (United Arab Emirates) Al Shabab)
11	FW	NED	Melvin Platje (at (Sweden) Kalmar)
29	FW	AZE	Ilham Allahverdiyev (at (Azerbaijan) Qaradağ FK)

No.	Pos.	Nation	Player
—	GK	AZE	Rashad Azizli (at (Azerbaijan) Simurq)
—	MF	AZE	Tanrıverdi Maharramli (at (Azerbaijan) Neftchala FK)

=== Reserve squad ===
As of 19 January 2014

Note: Flags indicate national team as defined under FIFA eligibility rules; some limited exceptions apply. Players may hold more than one non-FIFA nationality.

No.	Pos.	Nation	Player
1	GK	AZE	Ziyadxan Mammadov
2	DF	AZE	Amrah Aliyev
3	DF	AZE	Alexander Gross
4	DF	AZE	Rahil Mammadov
5	DF	AZE	Vasif Mehraliyev
7	MF	AZE	Elmikhan Mammadov
8	MF	AZE	Omar Mahmudzade
9	FW	AZE	Orxan Hasanli
11	FW	AZE	Javid Muxtarzade (captain)
12	GK	AZE	Ruzi Giyasli
13	DF	AZE	Vahid Guliyev
14	MF	AZE	Zahid Guliyev
15	MF	AZE	Mehdi Rasulov
17	MF	AZE	Orxan Gurbanli
18	MF	AZE	Mirabdulla Abbasov
19	MF	AZE	Emin Ibrahimov
20	MF	AZE	Yunis Babayev
21	MF	AZE	Agshin Gurbanli
22	DF	AZE	Tural Ibrahimov
23	MF	AZE	Emil Hasanzade
26	MF	AZE	Parviz Garaxanov

No.	Pos.	Nation	Player
27	MF	AZE	Kanan Manafov
28	DF	AZE	Ruslan Sorokin
29	FW	AZE	Orxan Ibrahimov
35	MF	AZE	Giovanni Abdullayev
--	GK	AZE	Elizbar Guliyev
--	DF	AZE	Mikayil Mikayilzade
--	DF	AZE	Feyruz Ibrahimov
--	DF	AZE	Tural Mammadli
--	DF	AZE	Fariz Ramazanov
--	DF	AZE	Xayal Guliyev
--	DF	AZE	Tural Adigozalov
--	DF	AZE	Nurlan Isbandiyarov
--	DF	AZE	Elvin Badalov
--	MF	AZE	Zeynal Zeynalov
--	MF	AZE	Tarlan Ahmadov
--	MF	AZE	Tural Rzayev
--	MF	AZE	Aslan Huseynov
--	MF	AZE	Javidan Melikov
--	MF	AZE	Elmin Ismayilzade
--	FW	AZE	Anar Huseynov

== Transfers ==
=== Summer ===
In: Note: Flags indicate national team as defined under FIFA eligibility rules; some limited exceptions apply. Players may hold more than one non-FIFA nationality.

No.	Pos.	Nation	Player
1	GK	LAT	Pāvels Doroševs (from (Latvia) Liepājas Metalurgs)
2	DF	BRA	Carlos Cardoso (from (Brazil) Vitória)
11	FW	NED	Melvin Platje (from (Netherlands) NEC)
15	MF	PAR	Éric Ramos (loan extended from (Paraguay) Rubio Ñu)
17	MF	AZE	Nijat Gurbanov (loan return from (Azerbaijan) Simurq PFC)
90	FW	CMR	Ernest Nfor (from (Belgium) KV Kortrijk)
—	DF	AZE	Alexander Gross (from (Azerbaijan) İnter Baku)

Out: Note: Flags indicate national team as defined under FIFA eligibility rules; some limited exceptions apply. Players may hold more than one non-FIFA nationality.

No.	Pos.	Nation	Player
2	MF	CHI	José Cabión (to (Chile) Rangers de Talca)
8	FW	AZE	Elshan Abdullayev (on loan to (Azerbaijan) Sumgayit)
10	MF	SLE	Julius Wobay (on loan to (United Arab Emirates) Al Shabab)
11	FW	CHI	Nicolás Canales (to (Chile) Colo-Colo)
12	GK	AZE	Emil Balayev (on loan to (Azerbaijan) Araz Naxchivan)
17	MF	AZE	Nijat Gurbanov (on loan to (Azerbaijan) Simurq PFC)
20	DF	AZE	Slavik Alkhasov (on loan to (Azerbaijan) Sumgayit)
21	FW	AZE	Kamil Nurähmädov (to (Azerbaijan) Ravan Baku)
26	DF	AZE	Karim Diniyev (on loan to (Azerbaijan) Sumgayit)
29	FW	AZE	Ilham Allahverdiyev (on loan to (Azerbaijan) FK Qaradag)
—	GK	AZE	Rashad Azizli (on loan to (Azerbaijan) Simurq)
—	MF	AZE	Tanrıverdi Maharramli (on loan to (Azerbaijan) Neftchala FK)
23	FW	AZE	Ruslan Qurbanov (on loan to (Azerbaijan) Sumgayit)

=== Winter ===
In: Note: Flags indicate national team as defined under FIFA eligibility rules; some limited exceptions apply. Players may hold more than one non-FIFA nationality.

No.	Pos.	Nation	Player
8	FW	AZE	Elshan Abdullayev (loan return from (Azerbaijan) Sumgayit)
12	GK	AZE	Emil Balayev (loan return from (Azerbaijan) Araz Naxchivan)
20	DF	AZE	Slavik Alkhasov (loan return from (Azerbaijan) Sumgayit)
21	FW	AZE	Samir Masimov (from (Russia) Lokomotiv Moscow)
23	FW	AZE	Ruslan Qurbanov (loan return from (Azerbaijan) Sumgayit)
26	FW	AZE	Karim Diniyev (loan return from (Azerbaijan) Sumgayit)
29	FW	AZE	Ilham Allahverdiyev (loan return from (Azerbaijan) FK Qaradag)
—	DF	AZE	Elvin Badalov (from (Russia) Zenit St. Petersburg)

Out: Note: Flags indicate national team as defined under FIFA eligibility rules; some limited exceptions apply. Players may hold more than one non-FIFA nationality.

No.	Pos.	Nation	Player
11	FW	NED	Melvin Platje (on loan to (Sweden) Kalmar)
12	GK	AZE	Emil Balayev (on loan to (Azerbaijan) Araz Naxchivan)
20	DF	AZE	Slavik Alkhasov (to (Azerbaijan) Khazar Lankaran)
26	FW	AZE	Karim Diniyev (to (Azerbaijan) AZAL)

== The board of directors ==
Position	Name
Vice-President	(Azerbaijan) Tahir Suleymanov
managing director	(Azerbaijan) Mubariz Khudiyev
Sporting Director	(Azerbaijan) Elkhan Aliyev
Press and Operations Officer	(Azerbaijan) Gunduz Abbaszade

=== Coaching staff ===
Position	Staff
Manager	(Azerbaijan) Boyukagha Hajiyev
Assistant first team coach	(Azerbaijan) Samir Aliyev
Selection coach	(Azerbaijan) Bakhtiyar Musayev
Goalkeeper coach	(Serbia) Nebojsa Manojlović
Fitness coach	(Spain) Ruben Seles
Club doctor	(Azerbaijan) Boris Khatagurov
Assistant doctor	(Azerbaijan) Rasim Gadimaliev
Assistant doctor	(Azerbaijan) Tofig Gasimov
Physiotherapist	(Azerbaijan) Zakir Guliyev
Source: Neftchi Baku PFC

== Competitions ==
=== Friendlies ===
28 June 2013	Neftchi Baku (Azerbaijan)	0–1	(Russia) Volga Nizhny Novgorod	Austria
20:00 AZST (UTC+5)		Summary	Shulenin 76'

30 June 2013	Neftchi Baku (Azerbaijan)	3–0	(Germany) Wacker Burghausen	Austria
21:00 AZST (UTC+5)	Imamverdiyev 22'; Nasimov 59'; Gurbanov 60'	Summary

3 July 2013	Neftchi Baku (Azerbaijan)	0–2	(Germany) FC Energie Cottbus	Austria
AZST (UTC+5)		[ Summary]

6 July 2013	Neftchi Baku (Azerbaijan)	0–3	(Israel) Maccabi Haifa	Austria
AZST (UTC+5)		Summary	Ezra 27'; Eyal 79'; Toat 86'

9 July 2013	Neftchi Baku (Azerbaijan)	0–0	(Russia) Terek Grozny	Austria
18:30 AZST (UTC+5)		Summary

11 July 2013	Neftchi Baku (Azerbaijan)	1–2	(Germany) Dynamo Dresden	Austria
AZST (UTC+5)		[ Summary]

15 January 2014	Neftchi Baku (Azerbaijan)	2–0	(Albania) Partizani Tirana	Antalya, Turkey
19:00 AZT (UTC+4)	Abdullayev 34'; Masimov 77'	Summary

18 January 2014	Neftchi Baku (Azerbaijan)	0–0	(Turkey) Fenerbahçe	Antalya, Turkey
22:00 AZT (UTC+4)		[ Summary]		Stadium: Mardan Stadium

21 January 2014	Neftchi Baku (Azerbaijan)	4–2	(Kazakhstan) Tobol	Antalya, Turkey
AZT (UTC+4)	Yunuszade 20'; Cardoso 35'; R.Gurbanov 65'; Nasimov 70'	Summary	Goal

24 January 2014	Neftchi Baku (Azerbaijan)	0–0	(Ukraine) Metalurh Zaporizhya	Antalya, Turkey
AZT (UTC+4)		[ Summary]

26 January 2014	Neftchi Baku (Azerbaijan)	1–3	(Poland) Śląsk Wrocław	Antalya, Turkey
AZT (UTC+4)		[ Summary]

=== Azerbaijan Supercup ===
23 October 2013	Khazar Lankaran	2–1	Neftchi Baku	Nakhchivan City
15:00 AZST (UTC+5)	Etame 27'; Sadio (yellow card) 26' (yellow-red card) 64'; Ramaldanov 27'	Summary	Cardoso 68'	Stadium: Nakhchivan City Stadium; Attendance: 9,800; Referee: Rahim Hasanov

=== Azerbaijan Premier League ===
==== Results summary ====
Overall								Home						Away					
Pld	W	D	L	GF	GA	GD	Pts	W	D	L	GF	GA	GD	W	D	L	GF	GA	GD
35	17	8	10	47	42	+5	59	12	3	3	31	19	+12	5	5	7	16	23	−7

Last updated: 12 May 2014.
Source: Soccerway

==== Results by round ====
Round	1	2	3	4	5	6	7	8	9	10	11	12	13	14	15	16	17	18	19	20	21	22	23	24	25	26	27	28	29	30	31	32	33	34	35	36
Ground	H	A	H	A	A	H	H	H	A	H	A	H	H	A	A	A	H	A	H	A	A	H	A	H	A	H	A	H	H	A	H	A	H	A	H	A
Result	W	W	W	D	L	W	D	D	W	W	D	W	W	L	W	L	W	L	W	D	L	D	L	L	W	W	W	W	W	L	L	D	L	D	W	D
Position	1	2	2	2	3	2	3	3	2	2	3	2	2	2	1	3	1	3	2	2	2	4	4	5	4	2	2	2	2	3	3	3	3	4	3	4

Source: Soccerway
A = Away; H = Home; W = Win; D = Draw; L = Loss

==== Results ====
3 August 2013 1	Neftchi Baku	4–1	AZAL	Baku
20:00 AZST (UTC+5)	Nasimov 9'; Flavinho 29'; R. Sadiqov 36'; E. Mehdiyev 90+2'	Summary	W. John 58'	Stadium: Bakcell Arena; Attendance: 2,000; Referee: Vusal Äliyev

10 August 2013 2	Ravan Baku	0–2	Neftchi Baku	Baku
21:00 AZST (UTC+5)	Adamović (yellow card) 51' (yellow-red card) 78'	Summary	Nasimov 15', 85'	Stadium: Bayil Stadium; Attendance: 500; Referee: Ramil Diniyev

17 August 2013 3	Neftchi Baku	1–0	Simurq	Baku
21:00 AZST (UTC+5)	Ramos 35'; Yunuszade (red card) 42'	Summary		Stadium: Bakcell Arena; Attendance: 800; Referee: Aliyar Ağayev

25 August 2013 4	Khazar Lankaran	0–0	Neftchi Baku	Lankaran
20:00 AZST (UTC+5)		Summary		Stadium: Lankaran City Stadium; Attendance: 10,000; Referee: Fariz Yusifov

31 August 2013 5	Baku	3–0	Neftchi Baku	Baku
18:00 AZST (UTC+5)	Aliyev 11'; Ismayilov 32'; Huseynov (red card) 48'; A.Mammadov (red card) 49'; Mario 68'	Summary		Stadium: Tofik Bakhramov Stadium Training Ground^{2} Attendance: 1,000; Referee: Rahim Häsänov

12 September 2013 6	Neftchi Baku	3–1	Inter Baku	Baku
19:00 AZST (UTC+5)	Abdullayev 14'; Cardoso 21'; Platje 45+1'; Bruno (yellow card) 35' (yellow-red card) 83'	Summary	Javadov 67'; A.Abatsiyev (yellow card) 54' (yellow-red card) 83'	Stadium: Bakcell Arena; Attendance: 1,500; Referee: Vusal Äliyev

21 September 2013 7	Neftchi Baku	0–0	Sumqayit	Baku
19:00 AZST (UTC+5)		Summary		Stadium: Bakcell Arena; Attendance: 1,500; Referee: Aliyar Ağayev

28 September 2013 8	Neftchi Baku	0–0	Qarabağ	Baku
19:00 AZST (UTC+5)		Summary		Stadium: Bakcell Arena; Attendance: 2,500; Referee: Rahim Häsänov

4 October 2013 9	Gabala	1–2	Neftchi Baku	Qabala
16:00 AZST (UTC+5)	Ebecilio 7'	Summary	Shukurov 21'; Sadiqov 56'	Stadium: Gabala City Stadium; Attendance: 2,500; Referee: Rauf Jabbarov

19 October 2013 10	Neftchi Baku	2–1	Ravan Baku	Baku
16:00 AZST (UTC+5)	Denis 65'; Nasimov 79'	Summary	Varea 8'	Stadium: Bakcell Arena; Attendance: 1,000; Referee: Orkhan Mämmädov

27 October 2013 11	Simurq	0–0	Neftchi Baku	Baku
18:00 AZT (UTC+4)		Summary		Stadium: Shafa Stadium; Attendance: 450; Referee: Aliyar Ağayev

2 November 2013 12	Neftchi Baku	4–1	Khazar Lankaran	Baku
19:00 AZT (UTC+4)	Nasimov 45'; Shukurov 65' (pen.); Nfor 90'; Flavinho 90+3'	Summary	Etame 90+1'	Stadium: Bakcell Arena; Attendance: 2,000; Referee: Orkhan Mämmädov

11 November 2013 13	Neftchi Baku	2–1	Baku	Baku
19:00 AZT (UTC+4)	Nfor 2'; Stamenković (red card) 27'; Imamverdiyev 45+2'	Summary	Ramos 53' (o.g.)	Stadium: Bakcell Arena; Attendance: 3,000; Referee: Fariz Yusifov

23 November 2013 14	Inter Baku	3–1	Neftchi Baku	Baku
15:00 AZT (UTC+4)	Javadov 33', 77'; Iashvili 81'	Summary	Flavinho (red card) 63'; Cardoso 65'	Stadium: Shafa Stadium; Attendance: 1,000; Referee: Rahim Häsänov

30 November 2013 15	Sumgayit	1–2	Neftchi Baku	Sumqayit
17:00 AZT (UTC+4)	Novruzov 35'; Abbasov (red card) 90'	Summary	Cardoso 23'; Ramos 85'	Stadium: Mehdi Huseynzade Stadium; Attendance: 1,000; Referee: Fariz Yusifov

8 December 2013 16	Qarabağ	3–1	Neftchi Baku	Baku
18:00 AZT (UTC+4)	Reynaldo 6', 58'; Chumbinho 73' (pen.)	Summary	Cardoso 56'	Stadium: Tofiq Bahramov Stadium^{1} Attendance: 1,500; Referee: Vusal Äliyev

15 December 2013 17	Neftchi Baku	2–1	Gabala	Baku
18:00 AZT (UTC+4)	Abdullayev 12' (pen.); Shukurov 90+4'	Summary	Leonardo 45+1' (pen.); Teymurov (yellow card) 11' (yellow-red card) 84'	Stadium: Bakcell Arena; Attendance: 800; Referee: Aliyar Ağayev

20 December 2013 18	AZAL	2–1	Neftchi Baku	Baku
15:00 AZT (UTC+4)	John 19'; Shemonayev 88'	Summary	Sadiqov 59'; Shukurov (yellow card) 74' (yellow-red card) 80'; Yunuszade (yellow card) 27' (red card) 83'	Stadium: AZAL Arena; Attendance: 500; Referee: Orkhan Mämmädov

2 February 2014 19	Neftchi Baku	3–0	Simurq	Baku
14:30 AZT (UTC+4)	Nfor 59', 85'; Imamverdiyev 70'	Summary		Stadium: Bakcell Arena; Attendance: 200; Referee: Aliyar Ağayev

9 February 2014 20	Khazar Lankaran	2–2	Neftchi Baku	Lankaran
16:00 AZT (UTC+4)	Nildo 85'; Scarlatache 90+3'; Ramazanov (red card) 90+4'	Summary	Thiego 9' (o.g.); Abdullayev 52'; Guliyev (yellow card) 45+1' (yellow-red card) 89'; Cardoso (yellow card) 34' (red card) 90+4'; Bruno (red card) 90+4'	Stadium: Lankaran City Stadium; Attendance: 11,000; Referee: Rahim Häsänov

15 February 2014 21	Baku	2–0	Neftchi Baku	Baku
13:30 AZT (UTC+4)	Huseynov 60'; Noguera 86'	Summary		Stadium: Tofik Bakhramov Stadium Training Ground^{2} Attendance: 1,000; Referee: Aliyar Ağayev

19 February 2014 22	Neftchi Baku	2–2	Inter Baku	Baku
16:00 AZT (UTC+4)	Abdullayev 76' (pen.); R.Gurbanov 86'	Summary	Bocognano 29'; Salukvadze 81'	Stadium: Bakcell Arena; Attendance: 500; Referee: Fariz Yusifov

23 February 2014 23	Sumgayit	2–0	Neftchi Baku	Sumqayit
15:00 AZT (UTC+4)	Mirzaga Huseynpur 38', 70'	Summary		Stadium: Mehdi Huseynzade Stadium; Attendance: 1,500; Referee: Rauf Jabbarov

28 February 2014 24	Neftchi Baku	1–4	Qarabağ	Baku
17:00 AZT (UTC+4)	Abdullayev (red card) 62'; Seyidov 83'	Summary	George 23'; Reynaldo 31', 68', 87'	Stadium: Bakcell Arena; Attendance: 2,000; Referee: Vusal Äliyev

9 March 2014 25	Gabala	1–2	Neftchi Baku	Qabala
13:00 AZT (UTC+4)	Ebecilio 68'	Summary	Nasimov 29', 64'	Stadium: Gabala City Stadium; Attendance: 2,000; Referee: Fariz Yusifov

16 March 2014 26	Neftchi Baku	2–1	AZAL	Baku
17:30 AZT (UTC+4)	Abdullayev 6', 44'	Summary	John 90+3' (pen.)	Stadium: Bakcell Arena; Attendance: 500; Referee: Rauf Jabbarov

23 March 2014 27	Ravan Baku	0–1	Neftchi Baku	Baku
17:00 AZT (UTC+4)	Balokog (yellow card) 65' (yellow-red card) 70'	Summary	R.Gurbanov 10'	Stadium: Bayil Stadium; Attendance: 300; Referee: Ramil Diniyev

29 March 2014 28	Neftchi Baku	1–0	Khazar Lankaran	Baku
17:00 AZT (UTC+4)	Nfor 78'	Summary		Stadium: Bakcell Arena; Attendance: 4,000; Referee: Orkhan Mämmädov

6 April 2014 29	Neftchi Baku	1–0	Baku	Baku
15:30 AZST (UTC+5)	Nfor 80'	Summary		Stadium: Bakcell Arena; Attendance: 600; Referee: Aliyar Ağayev

11 April 2014 30	Inter Baku	2–1	Neftchi Baku	Baku
17:00 AZST (UTC+5)	Špičić 48', 66'	Summary	Yunuszade 61'	Stadium: Shafa Stadium; Attendance: 2,200; Referee: Orkhan Mämmädov

20 April 2014 31	Neftchi Baku	1–3	Sumgayit	Baku
17:00 AZST (UTC+5)	Abdullayev (red card) 90+2'; R.Gurbanov 90+3'	Summary	R.Hajiyev 20'; Pamuk 51'; Pamuk (yellow card) 61' (yellow-red card) 66'; Fardjad-Azad 78'	Stadium: Bakcell Arena; Attendance: 1,000; Referee: Elvin Äsgärov

27 April 2014 32	Qarabağ	1–1	Neftchi Baku	Baku
20:00 AZST (UTC+5)	Muarem 51'	Summary	Flavinho 40'	Stadium: Tofiq Bahramov Stadium^{1} Attendance: 3,000; Referee: Fariz Yusifov

2 May 2014 33	Neftchi Baku	1–2	Gabala	Baku
17:00 AZST (UTC+5)	Imamverdiyev 50'	Summary	Dodô 63'; Ebecilio 90'	Stadium: Bakcell Arena; Attendance: 2,000; Referee: Aliyar Ağayev

7 May 2014 34	AZAL	0–0	Neftchi Baku	Baku
18:00 AZST (UTC+5)	K.Diniyev (yellow card) 37' (yellow-red card) 58'; Agayev (red card) 86'	Summary		Stadium: AZAL Arena; Attendance: 650; Referee: Fariz Yusifov

12 May 2014 35	Neftchi Baku	2 – 1	Ravan Baku	Baku
18:00 AZST (UTC+5)	Bertucci 45'; Shukurov 88'	Summary	Balokog 8'	Stadium: Ismat Gayibov Stadium; Attendance: 1,000; Referee: Orkhan Mämmädov

17 May 2014 36	Simurq	0 – 0	Neftchi Baku	Zaqatala
17:00 AZST (UTC+5)		Summary	Yunuszade (red card) 45'; M.Seyidov (red card) 90+4'	Stadium: Zaqatala City Stadium; Attendance: 1,000; Referee: Fariz Yusifov

==== League table ====
Pos	Team	Pld	W	D	L	GF	GA	GD	Pts	Qualification or relegation
2	Inter Baku	36	20	7	9	60	37	+23	67	Qualification for Europa League first qualifying round
3	Gabala	36	18	7	11	48	36	+12	61	Qualification for Europa League first qualifying round
4	Neftçi Baku	36	17	9	10	47	43	+4	60	Qualification for Europa League second qualifying round
5	Baku	36	16	9	11	53	43	+10	57	
6	Khazar Lankaran	36	12	13	11	44	49	−5	49	

Source: Azerbaijan Professional Football league
Rules for classification: 1) points; 2) goal difference; 3) number of goals scored.

=== Azerbaijan Cup ===
4 December 2013 Second Round	Neftchi Baku	1 – 0	Kapaz	Baku
14:00 AZT (UTC+4)	Nfor 57'	Summary		Stadium: Bakcell Arena; Attendance: 450; Referee: Alik Yunusov

12 March 2014 Quarterfinals 1st leg	Inter Baku	1 – 1	Neftchi Baku	Baku
15:00 AZT (UTC+4)	Javadov 83'	Summary	Nasimov 51'	Stadium: Shafa Stadium; Attendance: 2,000; Referee: Äliyar Ağayev

19 March 2014 Quarterfinals 2nd leg	Neftchi Baku	0 – 0 (a1 – 1 agg.)	Inter Baku	Baku
19:00 AZT (UTC+4)		Summary		Stadium: Bakcell Arena; Attendance: 1,200; Referee: Aliyar Ağayev

16 April 2014 Semifinals 1st leg	Neftchi Baku	1 – 1	Ravan Baku	Baku
19:00 AZST (UTC+5)	Abdullayev 52'	Summary	Miracema 90+3'	Stadium: Bakcell Arena; Attendance: 1,500; Referee: Rauf Jabbarov

24 April 2014 Semifinals 2nd leg	Ravan Baku	1 – 3 (2 – 4 agg.)	Neftchi Baku	Baku
17:00 AZST (UTC+5)	Varea 17'	Summary	R.Gurbanov 9'; Flavinho 18'; Bertucci 55'	Stadium: Bayil Stadium; Attendance: 500; Referee: Aliyar Ağayev

22 May 2014 Final	Neftchi Baku	1 – 1 (3 – 2 p)	Gabala	Baku
20:00 AZST (UTC+5)	Masimov 52'	Summary	Izmailov 71'	Stadium: Tofiq Bahramov Stadium; Attendance: 22,000; Referee: Aliyar Ağayev
	Penalties
	Ramos (penalty scored); Flavinho (penalty scored); Denis (penalty missed); Bruno (penalty scored)		Izmailov (penalty missed); Santos (penalty missed); Assis (penalty scored); Hajiyev (penalty scored); Niasse (penalty missed)

=== UEFA Champions League ===
==== Qualifying phase ====
17 July 2013 2nd qualifying round 1st leg	Neftchi Baku (Azerbaijan)	0–0	(Albania) Skënderbeu Korçë	Baku, Azerbaijan
21:00 AZST (UTC+5)		Summary		Stadium: Bakcell Arena; Attendance: 10,200; Referee: Leontios Trattou (Cyprus)

23 July 2013 2nd qualifying round 2nd leg	Skënderbeu Korçë (Albania)	1–0 (a.e.t.) (1–0 agg.)	(Azerbaijan) Neftchi Baku	Korçë, Albania
23:00 AZST (UTC+5)	Orelesi 116'	Summary	Mitreski (yellow card) 53' (red card) 90+2'	Stadium: Stadiumi Skënderbeu; Attendance: 3,500; Referee: Paweł Gil (Poland)

== Squad statistics ==
As of Match played 22 May 2014

=== Appearances and goals ===
No.	Pos	Nat	Player	Total		Premier League		Azerbaijan Cup		Champions League		Azerbaijan Supercup	
No.	Pos	Nat	Player	Apps	Goals	Apps	Goals	Apps	Goals	Apps	Goals	Apps	Goals
1	GK	(Latvia) LAT	Pāvels Doroševs	8	0	2+2	0	4+0	0	0+0	0	0+0	0
2	DF	(Brazil) BRA	Carlos Cardoso	32	5	23+2	4	4+1	0	1+0	0	1+0	1
3	DF	(Brazil) BRA	Denis Silva	33	1	19+6	1	1+4	0	2+0	0	1+0	0
4	DF	(Azerbaijan) AZE	Tärlän Quliyev	17	0	11+4	0	2+0	0	0+0	0	0+0	0
5	DF	(North Macedonia) MKD	Igor Mitreski	20	0	17+0	0	1+0	0	2+0	0	0+0	0
6	MF	(Azerbaijan) AZE	Rashad Sadiqov	38	3	29+2	3	3+1	0	1+1	0	1+0	0
7	MF	(Azerbaijan) AZE	Araz Abdullayev	37	7	28+1	6	5+0	1	1+1	0	1+0	0
8	MF	(Azerbaijan) AZE	Elshan Abdullayev	9	0	1+6	0	0+2	0	0+0	0	0+0	0
9	MF	(Brazil) BRA	Flavinho	39	4	30+1	3	5+0	1	2+0	0	1+0	0
10	MF	(Azerbaijan) AZE	Javid Imamverdiyev	34	3	18+9	3	2+2	0	1+1	0	0+1	0
14	FW	(Uzbekistan) UZB	Bahodir Nasimov	26	8	15+6	7	3+0	1	0+1	0	1+0	0
15	MF	(Paraguay) PAR	Éric Ramos	40	2	32+0	2	5+0	0	2+0	0	1+0	0
16	DF	(Brazil) BRA	Bruno Bertucci	33	2	25+0	1	5+0	1	2+0	0	1+0	0
18	MF	(Azerbaijan) AZE	Orxan Qurbanli	1	0	0+1	0	0+0	0	0+0	0	0+0	0
19	MF	(Azerbaijan) AZE	Mirhuseyn Seyidov	29	1	12+13	1	3+0	0	0+0	0	1+0	0
21	FW	(Azerbaijan) AZE	Samir Masimov	15	1	8+5	0	1+1	1	0+0	0	0+0	0
22	DF	(Azerbaijan) AZE	Mahir Shukurov	34	4	31+0	4	0+0	0	2+0	0	1+0	0
23	FW	(Azerbaijan) AZE	Ruslan Qurbanov	19	4	7+8	3	1+3	1	0+0	0	0+0	0
27	DF	(Azerbaijan) AZE	Magsad Isayev	11	0	2+3	0	6+0	0	0+0	0	0+0	0
28	MF	(Azerbaijan) AZE	Emin Mehdiyev	12	1	2+10	1	0+0	0	0+0	0	0+0	0
30	GK	(Serbia) SRB	Saša Stamenković	39	0	34+0	0	2+0	0	2+0	0	1+0	0
32	DF	(Azerbaijan) AZE	Elvin Yunuszade	27	1	19+1	1	6+0	0	0+1	0	0+0	0
90	FW	(Cameroon) CMR	Ernest Nfor	38	7	22+9	6	6+0	1	0+0	0	0+1	0
95	DF	(Azerbaijan) AZE	Elvin Badalov	2	0	1+1	0	0+0	0	0+0	0	0+0	0
Players away from Neftchi on loan:
10	MF	(Sierra Leone) SLE	Julius Wobay	2	0	0+0	0	0+0	0	2+0	0	0+0	0
11	FW	(Netherlands) NED	Melvin Platje	19	1	6+8	1	0+2	0	2+0	0	0+1	0
Players who appeared for Neftchi no longer at the club:
18	FW	(Azerbaijan) AZE	Fahmin Muradbayli	1	0	0+0	0	1+0	0	0+0	0	0+0	0

=== Goal scorers ===
Place	Position	Nation	Number	Name	Premier League	Azerbaijan Cup	Champions League	Azerbaijan Supercup	Total
1	FW	(Uzbekistan)	14	Bahodir Nasimov	7	1	0	0	8
2	FW	(Cameroon)	90	Ernest Nfor	6	1	0	0	7
3	MF	(Azerbaijan)	7	Araz Abdullayev	6	1	0	0	7
4	DF	(Brazil)	2	Carlos Cardoso	4	0	0	1	5
5	DF	(Azerbaijan)	22	Mahir Shukurov	4	0	0	0	4
5	FW	(Azerbaijan)	23	Ruslan Qurbanov	3	1	0	0	4
5	MF	(Brazil)	9	Flavinho	3	1	0	0	4
8	MF	(Azerbaijan)	6	Rashad Sadiqov	3	0	0	0	3
8	MF	(Azerbaijan)	10	Javid Imamverdiyev	3	0	0	0	3
10	MF	(Paraguay)	15	Éric Ramos	2	0	0	0	2
10	DF	(Brazil)	16	Bruno Bertucci	1	1	0	0	2
12	MF	(Azerbaijan)	28	Emin Mehdiyev	1	0	0	0	1
12	FW	(Netherlands)	11	Melvin Platje	1	0	0	0	1
12	DF	(Brazil)	3	Denis Silva	1	0	0	0	1
12	MF	(Azerbaijan)	19	Mirhuseyn Seyidov	1	0	0	0	1
12	DF	(Azerbaijan)	32	Elvin Yunuszade	1	0	0	0	1
12	FW	(Azerbaijan)	21	Samir Masimov	0	1	0	0	1
12				Own goal	1	0	0	0	1
				TOTALS	47	7	0	1	55

=== Disciplinary record ===
Number	Nation	Position	Name	Premier League		Azerbaijan Cup		Champions League		Azerbaijan Supercup		Total	
Number	Nation	Position	Name	Yellow card	Red card	Yellow card	Red card	Yellow card	Red card	Yellow card	Red card	Yellow card	Red card
1	(Latvia)	GK	Pāvels Doroševs	1	0	0	0	0	0	0	0	1	0
2	(Brazil)	DF	Carlos Cardoso	8	1	3	0	0	0	0	0	11	1
3	(Brazil)	DF	Denis Silva	4	0	1	0	0	0	0	0	5	0
4	(Azerbaijan)	DF	Tärlän Quliyev	4	1	1	0	0	0	0	0	5	1
5	(North Macedonia)	DF	Igor Mitreski	4	0	0	0	2	1	0	0	6	1
6	(Azerbaijan)	MF	Rashad Sadiqov	4	0	1	0	1	0	0	0	6	0
7	(Azerbaijan)	MF	Araz Abdullayev	7	2	0	0	1	0	1	0	9	2
9	(Brazil)	MF	Flavinho	6	1	1	0	1	0	1	0	9	1
10	(Azerbaijan)	MF	Javid Imamverdiyev	6	0	1	0	0	0	0	0	7	0
14	(Uzbekistan)	FW	Bahodir Nasimov	2	0	0	0	0	0	1	0	3	0
15	(Paraguay)	MF	Éric Ramos	12	0	3	0	1	0	0	0	16	0
16	(Brazil)	DF	Bruno Bertucci	7	2	0	0	0	0	0	0	7	2
19	(Azerbaijan)	MF	Mirhuseyn Seyidov	1	1	2	0	0	0	0	0	3	1
22	(Azerbaijan)	DF	Mahir Shukurov	10	1	0	0	1	0	1	0	12	1
23	(Azerbaijan)	FW	Ruslan Qurbanov	1	0	0	0	0	0	0	0	1	0
25	(Azerbaijan)	MF	Javid Imamverdiyev	0	0	0	0	1	0	0	0	1	0
28	(Azerbaijan)	MF	Emin Mehdiyev	1	0	0	0	0	0	0	0	1	0
30	(Serbia)	GK	Saša Stamenković	2	1	0	0	0	0	1	0	3	1
32	(Azerbaijan)	DF	Elvin Yunuszade	5	3	1	0	1	0	0	0	7	3
90	(Cameroon)	FW	Ernest Nfor	7	0	1	0	0	0	0	0	8	0
95	(Azerbaijan)	DF	Elvin Badalov	1	0	0	0	0	0	0	0	1	0
			TOTALS	93	13	15	0	9	1	5	0	121	13
