= 2012–13 Neftchi Baku PFK season =

Neftchi Baku
2012–13 season
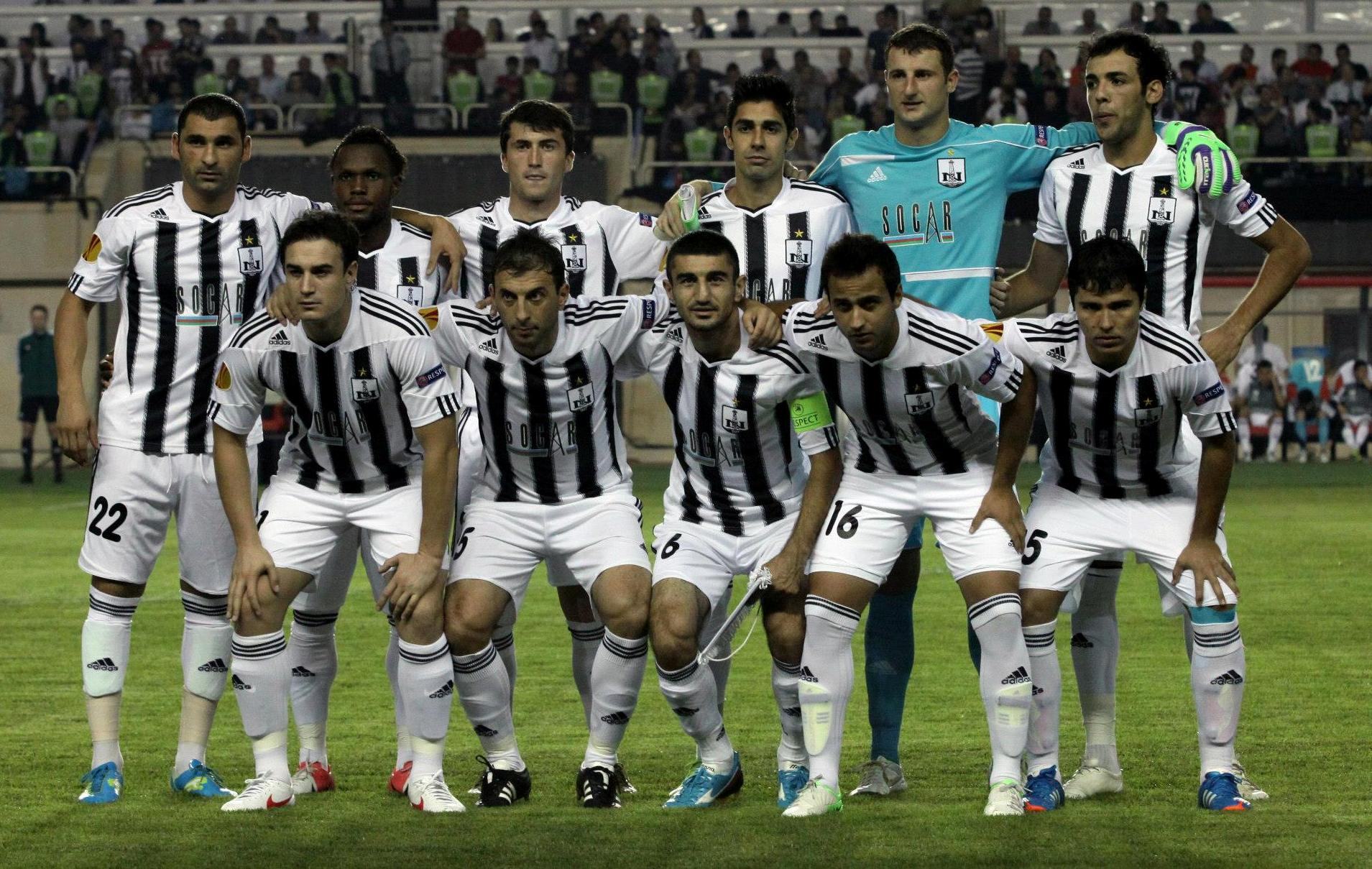
- Chairman: Sadyg Sadygov
- Manager: Boyukagha Hajiyev
- Stadium: Bakcell Arena
- Premier League: 1st
- Azerbaijan Cup: Champions
- Champions League: Third Qualifying Round vs Ironi Kiryat Shmona
- Europa League: Group Stage
- Top goalscorer: League: Nicolás Canales (26); All: Nicolás Canales (30)
- Highest home attendance: 31,400 vs Internazionale; 4 October 2012
- Lowest home attendance: 250 vs Turan; 8 October 2012
- Average home league attendance: 4,276
Home colours	Away colours	Third colours

The Neftchi Baku 2012–13 season is Neftchi Baku's 21st Azerbaijan Premier League season, and their third season under manager Boyukagha Hajiyev. Neftchi participated in the Second and Third UEFA Champions League qualifying rounds, defeating FC Zestaponi of Georgia in the Second round before losing to Ironi Kiryat Shmona of Israel in the Third round. This meant that they dropped down into the 2012–13 UEFA Europa League Play Off Round, where they defeated APOEL of Cyprus 4–2 on aggregate to qualify for the group stages of the Europa League for the first time. In the group stages they were drawn against FK Partizan of Serbia, Rubin Kazan of Russia and Internazionale of Italy. They also won the Azerbaijan Premier League for the 3rd time in a row, and completed a domestic double by defeating Khazar Lankaran on penalties in the Azerbaijan Cup final.

== Squad ==
As of 11 April 2013

Note: Flags indicate national team as defined under FIFA eligibility rules; some limited exceptions apply. Players may hold more than one non-FIFA nationality.

No.	Pos.	Nation	Player
2	MF	CHI	José Cabión
3	DF	BRA	Denis Silva
4	DF	AZE	Tärlän Quliyev
5	DF	MKD	Igor Mitreski
6	MF	AZE	Rashad Sadiqov (captain)
8	FW	AZE	Elshan Abdullayev
9	MF	BRA	Flavinho
10	MF	SLE	Julius Wobay
11	FW	CHI	Nicolás Canales
12	GK	AZE	Emil Balayev
13	DF	AZE	Samir Yusifov
14	FW	UZB	Bahodir Nasimov
15	MF	PAR	Éric Ramos (loan from Rubio Ñu)

No.	Pos.	Nation	Player
16	DF	BRA	Bruno Bertucci
17	MF	AZE	Araz Abdullayev
19	MF	AZE	Mirhüseyn Seyidov
20	MF	AZE	Eshgin Guliyev
21	MF	AZE	Kamil Nurähmädov
22	DF	AZE	Mahir Shukurov
25	MF	AZE	Javid Imamverdiyev
26	DF	AZE	Karim Diniyev
27	MF	AZE	Kanan Manafov
28	MF	AZE	Emin Mehdiyev
30	GK	SRB	Saša Stamenković
32	DF	AZE	Elvin Yunuszade
33	MF	AZE	Orkhan Bashirov

=== Out on loan ===
Note: Flags indicate national team as defined under FIFA eligibility rules; some limited exceptions apply. Players may hold more than one non-FIFA nationality.

No.	Pos.	Nation	Player
—	GK	AZE	Eyyub Aliyev (at Simurq)
—	DF	AZE	Slavik Alkhasov (at Sumgayit)
—	DF	AZE	Nijat Gurbanov (at Simurq)

No.	Pos.	Nation	Player
—	FW	AZE	Ruslan Qurbanov (at Sumgayit)
29	FW	AZE	Ilham Allahverdiyev (at FK Qaradag)

== Transfers ==
=== Summer ===
In: Note: Flags indicate national team as defined under FIFA eligibility rules; some limited exceptions apply. Players may hold more than one non-FIFA nationality.

No.	Pos.	Nation	Player
3	DF	AZE	Saşa Yunisoğlu (from (Azerbaijan) Gabala)
6	MF	AZE	Rashad Sadigov (from (Azerbaijan) Qarabağ)
10	MF	SLE	Julius Wobay (from (Egypt) Al-Masry)
11	FW	CHI	Nicolás Canales (from (Chile) Palestino)
15	MF	PAR	Eric Ramos (loan from (Paraguay) Rubio Ñu)
16	DF	BRA	Bruno Bertucci (from (Switzerland) Grasshoppers)
17	MF	AZE	Araz Abdullayev (from (England) Everton)
22	DF	AZE	Mahir Shukurov (from (Azerbaijan) Gabala)
—	GK	AZE	Emil Balayev (from (Azerbaijan) Sumgayit FC)

Out: Note: Flags indicate national team as defined under FIFA eligibility rules; some limited exceptions apply. Players may hold more than one non-FIFA nationality.

No.	Pos.	Nation	Player
1	GK	AZE	Rauf Mehdiyev (Retired)
2	DF	AZE	Rail Malikov (to (Turkey) Denizlispor)
3	DF	BRA	Denis Silva (to (Brazil) Grêmio)
6	MF	MKD	Slavčo Georgievski (to (Azerbaijan) İnter Baku)
11	MF	AZE	Javid Huseynov (to (Turkey) Adana Demirspor)
12	GK	AZE	Elchin Sadygov (to (Azerbaijan) Sumgayit FC)
13	DF	AZE	Tural Narimanov (to (Azerbaijan) AZAL)
15	DF	AZE	Ruslan Abishov (to (Azerbaijan) Khazar Lankaran)
16	DF	BRA	Alessandro
18	DF	AZE	Ruslan Amirjanov (to (Azerbaijan) Inter Baku)
21	FW	AZE	Aghabala Ramazanov (to (Azerbaijan) Khazar Lankaran)
22	FW	AZE	Farid Guliev (to (Azerbaijan) Turan Tovuz)
27	MF	AZE	Rashad Abdullayev (to (Azerbaijan) Gabala)
—	FW	AZE	Orkhan Hasanov (to (Azerbaijan) AZAL)
—	DF	AZE	Ruslan Tagizade (to (Azerbaijan) AZAL)
—	GK	AZE	Eyyub Aliyev (on loan to (Azerbaijan) Simurg)
—	DF	AZE	Slavik Alkhasov (on loan to (Azerbaijan) Sumgayit)
—	FW	AZE	Ruslan Qurbanov (on loan to (Azerbaijan) Sumgayit)
—	DF	AZE	Nicat Qurbanov (on loan to (Azerbaijan) Simurg)

=== Winter ===
In: Note: Flags indicate national team as defined under FIFA eligibility rules; some limited exceptions apply. Players may hold more than one non-FIFA nationality.

No.	Pos.	Nation	Player
1	GK	SUI	Johnny Leoni (loan from (Cyprus) Omonia)
2	MF	CHI	José Luis Cabión (from (Chile) Colo-Colo)
3	DF	BRA	Denis Silva (from (Brazil) Grêmio)

Out: Note: Flags indicate national team as defined under FIFA eligibility rules; some limited exceptions apply. Players may hold more than one non-FIFA nationality.

No.	Pos.	Nation	Player
1	GK	SUI	Johnny Leoni (loan return to (Cyprus) Omonia)
3	DF	AZE	Saşa Yunisoğlu (to (Azerbaijan) AZAL)
7	MF	BRA	Rodriguinho (to (Brazil) Sport)
18	MF	AZE	Elgiz Karamli (to (Azerbaijan) Kəpəz)
29	FW	AZE	Ilham Allahverdiyev (on loan at (Azerbaijan) FK Qaradag)

== Coaching staff ==
Position	Staff
Manager	(Azerbaijan) Boyukagha Hajiyev
Assistant first team coach	(Azerbaijan) Tarlan Ahmadov
Assistant first team coach	(Azerbaijan) Bakhtiyar Musayev
Assistant first team coach	(Azerbaijan) Kamal Quliyev
Goalkeeper coach	(Serbia) Nebojsa Manojlović
Fitness coach	(Spain) Ruben Seles
Club doctor	(Azerbaijan) Boris Khatagurov
Assistant doctor	(Azerbaijan) Rasim Gadimaliev
Assistant doctor	(Azerbaijan) Tofig Gasimov
Physiotherapist	(Azerbaijan) Zakir Guliyev
Source: Neftchi Baku PFC

== Competitions ==
=== Friendlies ===
19 January 2013	Neftchi Baku (Azerbaijan)	1 – 0	(Russia) Rotor	Antalya, Turkey
19:00 AZT (UTC+4)	Nasimov 69'	Summary

21 January 2013	Neftchi Baku (Azerbaijan)	3 – 2	(Kazakhstan) Aktobe	Antalya, Turkey
19:00 AZT (UTC+4)	Perico 20'; Canales 35'; Nasimov 54' (pen.)	[ Summary]	82'

23 January 2013	Neftchi Baku (Azerbaijan)	2 – 1	(North Macedonia) Turnovo	Antalya, Turkey
19:00 AZT (UTC+4)	Canales 32', 60'; Wobay (red card)	[ Summary]	Goal

27 January 2013	Neftchi Baku (Azerbaijan)	0 – 4	(Russia) Amkar Perm	Antalya, Turkey
19:00 AZT (UTC+4)		[ Summary]		Stadium: Mardan Sports Complex

29 January 2013	Neftchi Baku (Azerbaijan)	1 – 2	(Romania) ACS Poli Timişoara	Antalya, Turkey
19:00 AZT (UTC+4)	Canales 55'	[ Summary]	Goal	Stadium: Mardan Sports Complex

2 February 2013	Neftchi Baku (Azerbaijan)	4 – 4 (a.e.t.)	(China) Guangdong	Antalya, Turkey
19:00 AZT (UTC+4)	Flavinho 55', 86'; Abdullayev 75', 100'	Summary	Goal	Stadium: Mardan Sports Complex

=== Azerbaijan Premier League ===
==== Results summary ====
Overall								Home						Away					
Pld	W	D	L	GF	GA	GD	Pts	W	D	L	GF	GA	GD	W	D	L	GF	GA	GD
22	14	2	6	47	24	+23	44	9	1	1	30	9	+21	5	1	5	17	15	+2

Last updated: 4 March 2013.
Source: Soccerway

==== Results by round ====
Round	1	2	3	4	5	6	7	8	9	10	11	12	13	14	15	16	17	18	19	20	21	22
Ground	A	H	H	A	H	H	A	H	A	H	A	A	H	A	H	H	A	A	H	A	H	A
Result	L	W	W	L	W	W	L	W	L	W	W	L	W	L	D	W	D	W	W	W	W	W
Position	11	7	6	7	6	4	6	4	7	5	4	6	5	5	4	4	4	3	2	2	1	1

Source: Soccerway
A = Away; H = Home; W = Win; D = Draw; L = Loss

==== Results ====
3 August 2012 1	Neftchi Baku	Postponed	Baku	Baku
AZST (UTC+5)				Stadium: Tofig Bahramov Stadium

11 August 2012 2	Qarabağ	1 – 0	Neftchi Baku	Baku^{1}
20:00 AZST (UTC+5)	Garayev 41'	Summary		Stadium: Dalga Areana; Attendance: 800; Referee: Aliyar Agayev

18 August 2012 3	Neftchi Baku	3 – 0	Gabala	Baku
18:00 AZST (UTC+5)	Imamverdiyev 47', 87'; Wobay 56'	Summary		Stadium: Ismat Gayibov Stadium; Attendance: 800; Referee: Anar Salmanov

26 August 2012 4	AZAL	Postponed	Neftchi Baku	Baku
20:15 AZST (UTC+5)		Summary		Stadium: AZAL Stadium

15 September 2012 5	Neftchi Baku	2 – 1	Khazar Lankaran	Baku
17:00 AZST (UTC+5)	Canales 17'; Flavinho 74'	Summary	Sadio 8'	Stadium: Ismat Gayibov Stadium; Attendance: 4,500; Referee: Fariz Yusifov

24 September 2012 6	Sumgayit	3 – 2	Neftchi Baku	Sumqayit
17:00 AZST (UTC+5)	Aliyev 12'; Fardjad-Azad 49'; Ağayev 73'	Summary	Mustafayev 51' (o.g.); Canales 56'; Mehdiyev (red card) 90+1'	Stadium: Mehdi Huseynzade Stadium; Attendance: 3,000; Referee: Vusal Aliyev

28 September 2012 7	Inter Baku	Postponed	Neftchi Baku	Baku
16:00 AZST (UTC+5)		[ Summary]		Stadium: Shafa Stadium

8 October 2012 8	Neftchi Baku	2 – 1	Turan Tovuz	Baku
16:00 AZST (UTC+5)	Sadigov 11' (pen.); Ramos 37'	Summary	Pipia 90+2'	Stadium: Ismat Gayibov Stadium; Attendance: 250; Referee: Anar Salmanov

19 October 2012 9	Neftchi Baku	4 – 1	Kəpəz	Baku
16:00 AZST (UTC+5)	Wobay 23'; Canales 26', 64'; Abdullayev 70'	Summary	E.Aliyev 5'	Stadium: Ismat Gayibov Stadium; Attendance: 1,000; Referee: Elvin Askerov

28 October 2012 10	Ravan Baku	2 – 0	Neftchi Baku	Baku
15:30 AZT (UTC+4)	Orlovschi 33'; Varea 76' (pen.)	Summary		Stadium: Dalga Arena; Attendance: 1,000; Referee: Aliyar Ağayev

31 October 2012 11	Neftchi Baku	2 – 1	Simurq	Baku
16:00 AZST (UTC+5)	Canales 8' (pen.), 34'	Summary	R.Poladov 48'	Stadium: Ismat Gayibov Stadium; Attendance: 1,000; Referee: Elchin Mämmädov

3 November 2012 12	Gabala	2 – 1	Neftchi Baku	Qabala
15:00 AZT (UTC+4)	Assis 31'; Dodô 88'	Summary	Canales 32'	Stadium: Gabala City Stadium; Attendance: 1,100; Referee: Fariz Yusifov

17 November 2012 13	Neftchi Baku	8 – 1	Sumgayit	Baku
15:00 AZT (UTC+4)	Canales 7', 23', 45', 80'; Wobay 11', 25'; Imamverdiyev 68'; Bertucci 75'	Summary	Jafarguliyev 28'	Stadium: Ismat Gayibov Stadium; Attendance: 1,200; Referee: Elvin Äsgärov

25 November 2012 14	Baku	1 – 2	Neftchi Baku	Baku
14:20 AZT (UTC+4)	E.Mammadov 60'; N.Mammadov (red card) 87'	Summary	Canales 62' (pen.); Flavinho 90+2'	Stadium: Tofig Bakhramov Stadium; Attendance: 2,000; Referee: Elchin Mämmädov

2 December 2012 15	Neftchi Baku	0 – 1	Qarabağ	Baku
18:00 AZT (UTC+4)		Summary	Nadirov 12'	Stadium: Ismat Gayibov Stadium; Attendance: 3,000; Referee: Fariz Yusifov

10 December 2012 16	Neftchi Baku	2 – 0	Ravan Baku	Baku
18:00 AZT (UTC+4)	Seyidov 44'; Canales 63'	Summary		Stadium: Ismat Gayibov Stadium; Attendance: 1,500; Referee: Anar Salmanov

14 December 2012 17	Khazar Lankaran	2 – 1	Neftchi Baku	Lankaran
16:00 AZT (UTC+4)	Sialmas 7'; Pit 83'	Summary	Canales 52' (pen.)	Stadium: Lankaran City Stadium; Attendance: 9,500; Referee: Fariz Yusifov

18 December 2012 1	Neftchi Baku	1 – 1	Baku	Baku
18:00 AZT (UTC+4)	Sadigov 10' (pen.)	Summary	Guliyev 86'	Stadium: Tofig Bahramov Stadium; Attendance: 1,000; Referee: Rahim Häsänov

22 December 2012 18	Neftchi Baku	4 – 2	AZAL	Baku
15:00 AZT (UTC+4)	Flavinho 18'; Wobay 36'; Sadiqov 68'; Imamverdiyev 89'	Summary	Benouahi 78'; Nildo 90' (pen.)	Stadium: Eighth Kilometer District Stadium; Attendance: 1,000; Referee: Elchin Mammadov

25 December 2012 7	Inter Baku	1 – 1	Neftchi Baku	Baku
18:00 AZT (UTC+4)	Niasse 75'	Summary	Canales 11'	Stadium: Shafa Stadium; Attendance: 2,500; Referee: Vusal Äliyev

9 February 2013 19	Kəpəz	0 – 3	Neftchi Baku	Baku
15:00 AZT (UTC+4)		Summary	Flavinho 27'; Canales 68'; Abdullayev 72'	Stadium: Dalga Arena; Attendance: 400; Referee: Aliyar Ağayev

13 February 2013 4	AZAL	1 – 2	Neftchi Baku	Baku
16:00 AZT (UTC+4)	Nildo 73'	Summary	Canales 28', 46'	Stadium: AZAL Stadium; Attendance: 500; Referee: Fariz Yusifov

17 February 2013 20	Simurq	0 – 2	Neftchi Baku	Zaqatala
17:00 AZT (UTC+4)		Summary	Canales 30'; Sadiqov 43'	Stadium: Zaqatala City Stadium; Attendance: 3,000; Referee: Rahim Häsänov

23 February 2013 21	Neftchi Baku	2 – 0	Inter Baku	Baku
17:00 AZT (UTC+4)	Canales 49'; Abramidze 90+2' (o.g.)	Summary		Stadium: Ismat Gayibov Stadium; Attendance: 5,000; Referee: Aliyar Ağayev

3 March 2013 22	Turan Tovuz	2 – 3	Neftchi Baku	Tovuz
15:00 AZT (UTC+4)	Beraia 35'; Günlü 84'	Summary	Flavinho 11'; Abdullayev 61'; Imamverdiyev 75'	Stadium: Tovuz City Stadium; Attendance: 500; Referee: Elvin Äsgärov

==== League table ====
Pos	Team	Pld	W	D	L	GF	GA	GD	Pts	Qualification
1	Neftçi Baku	22	14	2	6	47	24	+23	44	Qualification for championship group
2	Inter Baku	22	11	8	3	24	12	+12	41	Qualification for championship group
3	Qarabağ	22	10	9	3	30	19	+11	39	Qualification for championship group
4	Simurq	22	9	9	4	25	15	+10	36	Qualification for championship group
5	Gabala	22	9	5	8	26	27	−1	32	Qualification for championship group

Source: Association of Football Federations of Azerbaijan and Soccerway.com
Rules for classification: 1) points; 2) goal difference; 3) number of goals scored.

=== Azerbaijan Premier League Championship Group ===
==== Results summary ====
Overall								Home						Away					
Pld	W	D	L	GF	GA	GD	Pts	W	D	L	GF	GA	GD	W	D	L	GF	GA	GD
10	5	3	2	12	8	+4	18	2	1	2	6	5	+1	3	2	0	6	3	+3

Last updated: 20 May 2013.
Source: Soccerway

==== Results by round ====
Round	1	2	3	4	5	6	7	8	9	10
Ground	A	A	H	A	H	H	A	H	A	H
Result	D	W	L	W	W	W	W	D	D	L
Position	1	1	1	1	1	1	1	1	1	1

Updated to match(es) played on 20 May 2013. Source: Soccerway
A = Away; H = Home; W = Win; D = Draw; L = Loss

==== Results ====
12 March 2013 23	Baku	1 – 1	Neftchi Baku	Baku
15:00 AZT (UTC+4)	Abdullayev 43'	Summary	Pena 83'	Stadium: Tofig Bakhramov Stadium; Attendance: 1,500; Referee: Fariz Yusifov

30 March 2013 24	Inter Baku	0 – 1	Neftchi Baku	Baku
17:00 AZT (UTC+4)		Summary	Wobay 31'; Sadiqov (yellow card) 16' (yellow-red card) 74'	Stadium: Shafa Stadium; Attendance: 1,500; Referee: Anar Salmanov

6 April 2013 25	Neftchi Baku	1 – 2	Qarabağ	Baku
17:00 AZST (UTC+5)	Mitreski (red card) 44'; Canales 87'	Summary	Richard 35' (pen.), 69'	Stadium: Bakcell Arena; Attendance: 2,500; Referee: Rahim Häsänov

13 April 2013 26	Simurq	0 – 1	Neftchi Baku	Zaqatala
18:00 AZST (UTC+5)		Summary	Wobay 49'	Stadium: Zaqatala City Stadium; Attendance: 2,500; Referee: Fariz Yusifov

21 April 2013 27	Neftchi Baku	2 – 1	Gabala	Baku
18:00 AZST (UTC+5)	Silva 53'; Flavinho (yellow card) 63' (yellow-red card) 66'; Canales 69'	Summary	Assis 15'; Chertoganov (yellow card) 37' (yellow-red card) 65'	Stadium: Bakcell Arena; Attendance: 1,000; Referee: Aliyar Ağayev

28 April 2013 28	Neftchi Baku	2 – 0	Inter Baku	Baku
18:00 AZST (UTC+5)	Canales 52', 70' (pen.)	Summary	Niasse (yellow card) 63' (yellow-red card) 69'	Stadium: Bakcell Arena; Attendance: 2,000; Referee: Vusal Äliyev

4 May 2013 29	Qarabağ	1 – 2	Neftchi Baku	Baku^{1}
19:00 AZST (UTC+5)	Richard 72' (pen.)	Summary	Canales 23', 84'	Stadium: Tofiq Bahramov Stadium; Attendance: 3,000; Referee: Fariz Yusifov

9 May 2013 30	Neftchi Baku	1 – 1	Simurq	Baku
21:00 AZST (UTC+5)	Wobay 26'	Summary	Eyyubov 14'	Stadium: Bakcell Arena; Attendance: 2,000; Referee: Rauf Jabbarov

14 May 2013 31	Gabala	1 – 1	Neftchi Baku	Qabala
17:30 AZST (UTC+5)	Kamanan 72'	Summary	Sadiqov 14'	Stadium: Gabala City Stadium; Attendance: 2,000; Referee: Fariz Yusifov

19 May 2013 32	Neftchi Baku	0 – 1	Baku	Baku
20:30 AZST (UTC+5)	Denis (red card) 60'	Summary	Horvat 75'	Stadium: Bakcell Arena; Attendance: 7,000; Referee: Rauf Jabbarov

==== Table ====
Pos	Team	Pld	W	D	L	GF	GA	GD	Pts	Qualification
1	Neftçi Baku (C)	32	19	5	8	59	32	+27	62	Qualification for Champions League second qualifying round
2	Qarabağ	32	16	11	5	43	26	+17	59	Qualification for Europa League first qualifying round
3	Inter Baku	32	16	9	7	38	22	+16	57	Qualification for Europa League first qualifying round
4	Simurq	32	12	12	8	32	26	+6	48	
5	Baku	32	9	14	9	33	27	+6	41	

Source: Soccerway.com
Rules for classification: 1) points; 2) goal difference; 3) number of goals scored.
(C) Champions

=== Azerbaijan Cup ===
28 November 2012 Second Round	Taraggi	0 – 5	Neftchi Baku	Ganja
13:00 AZT (UTC+4)		Summary	E.Abdullayev 17'; Yunuszade 25'; Shukurov 31' (pen.); Ramos 38'; K.Nurahmadov 45'	Attendance: 500; Referee: Rahim Häsänov

27 February 2013 Quarterfinals 1st Leg	Simurq	0 – 0	Neftchi Baku	Zaqatala
17:00 AZT (UTC+4)		Summary	Imamverdiyev (red card) 90+3'	Stadium: Zaqatala City Stadium; Attendance: 2,600; Referee: Fariz Yusifov

7 March 2013 Quarterfinals 2nd Leg	Neftchi Baku	1 – 0 (a.e.t.) (1 – 0 agg.)	Simurq	Baku
17:00 AZT (UTC+4)	Flavinho 120'	Summary	Božić (yellow card) 64' (yellow-red card) 72'	Stadium: Bakcell Arena; Attendance: 1,000; Referee: Aliyar Ağayev

17 April 2013 Semifinals 1st Leg	Neftchi Baku	2 – 1	Qarabağ	Baku
19:30 AZST (UTC+5)	Abdullayev 63' (pen.); Nasimov 90+1'	Summary	Nadirov 55'	Stadium: Bakcell Arena; Attendance: 1,000; Referee: Anar Salmanov

24 April 2013 Semifinals 2nd Leg	Qarabağ	2 – 2 (3 – 4 agg.)	Neftchi Baku	Baku^{1}
21:00 AZST (UTC+5)	Richard 41' (pen.); Opara 86'	Summary	Yunuszade 42'; Canales 77'	Stadium: Tofiq Bahramov Stadium; Attendance: 3,820; Referee: Fariz Yusifov

28 May 2013 Final	Neftchi Baku	0 – 0 (a.e.t.) (5 – 3 p)	Khazar Lankaran	Baku
20:00 AZST (UTC+5)		Summary		Stadium: Tofiq Bahramov Stadium; Attendance: 20,000; Referee: Aliyar Agayev
	Penalties
	Canales (penalty scored); Bertucci (penalty scored); Flavinho (penalty scored); Shukurov (penalty scored); Sadiqov (penalty scored)		(penalty missed) Sialmas; (penalty scored) Ramazanov; (penalty scored) Amirguliyev; (penalty scored) Sadio

=== UEFA Champions League ===
==== Qualifying phase ====
17 July 2012 2nd Qualifying round 1st Leg	Neftchi Baku (Azerbaijan)	3 – 0	(Georgia (country)) Zestaponi	Baku, Azerbaijan
21:00 AZST (UTC+5)	Imamverdiyev 22'; Wobay 24'; Canales 63'	Report; Summary		Stadium: Dalga Arena^{3} Attendance: 5,200; Referee: Marius Avram (Romania)

24 July 2012 2nd Qualifying round 2nd Leg	Zestaponi (Georgia (country))	2 – 2 (2 – 5 agg.)	(Azerbaijan) Neftchi Baku	Zestaponi, Georgia
22:00 AZST (UTC+5)	Mujiri 16'; Dvali 19'	Report; Summary	Wobay 22'; Sadigov 52' (pen.)	Stadium: David Abashidze Stadium; Attendance: 4,500; Referee: Artyom Kuchin (Kazakhstan)

1 August 2012 3rd Qualifying round 1st Leg	Ironi Kiryat Shmona (Israel)	4 – 0	(Azerbaijan) Neftchi Baku	Haifa, Israel
22:00 AZST (UTC+5)	Badash 42' (pen.); Abuhatzira 52'; Gerzicich 70', 76'	Report; Summary		Stadium: Kiryat Eliezer Stadium^{4} Attendance: 2,520; Referee: Alan Kelly (Republic of Ireland)

8 August 2012 3rd Qualifying round 2nd Leg	Neftchi Baku (Azerbaijan)	2 – 2 (2 – 6 agg.)	(Israel) Ironi Kiryat Shmona	Baku, Azerbaijan
21:00 AZST (UTC+5)	Wobay 31'; Imamverdiyev 76'	Report; Summary	Badash 50'; Lencse 90+1'	Stadium: Dalga Arena^{3} Attendance: 2,000; Referee: Martin Strömbergsson (Sweden)

=== UEFA Europa League ===
==== Play Off Round ====
23 August 2012 1st Leg	Neftchi Baku (Azerbaijan)	1 – 1	(Cyprus) APOEL	Baku, Azerbaijan
21:00 AZST (UTC+5)	Shukurov 82' (pen.)	Report; Summary	Benachour 83'	Stadium: Dalga Arena^{3} Attendance: 4,000; Referee: Robert Małek (Poland)

30 August 2012 2nd Leg	APOEL (Cyprus)	1 – 3 (2 – 4 agg.)	(Azerbaijan) Neftchi Baku	Nicosia, Cyprus
22:00 AZST (UTC+5)	Benachour 44'	Report; Summary	Imamverdiyev 22'; Wobay 30'; Flavinho 60'; Yunuszade (red card) 83'	Stadium: GSP Stadium; Attendance: 20,337; Referee: Saïd Ennjimi (France)

==== Group stage ====
Pos	Team	Pld	W	D	L	GF	GA	GD	Pts	Qualification	RUB	INT	PAR	NEF
1	(Russia) Rubin Kazan	6	4	2	0	10	3	+7	14	Advance to knockout phase	—	3–0	2–0	1–0
2	(Italy) Internazionale	6	3	2	1	11	9	+2	11	Advance to knockout phase	2–2	—	1–0	2–2
3	(Serbia) Partizan	6	0	3	3	3	8	−5	3 (Note: Tied on head-to-head points (2) and head-to-head goal difference (0). Head-to-head away goals: Partizan 1, Neftçi 0.)		1–1	1–3	—	0–0
4	(Azerbaijan) Neftçi	6	0	3	3	4	8	−4	3		0–1	1–3	1–1	—

Source: Soccerway
Notes:

21 September 2012 1	Partizan (Serbia)	0 – 0	(Azerbaijan) Neftchi Baku	Belgrade, Serbia
00:05 AZST (UTC+5)		Report		Stadium: Stadion FK Partizan; Attendance: 18,000; Referee: Libor Kovařík (Czech Republic)

4 October 2012 2	Neftchi Baku (Azerbaijan)	1 – 3	(Italy) Internazionale	Baku, Azerbaijan
21:00 AZST (UTC+5)	Canales 53'	Report	Coutinho 10'; Obi 30'; Livaja 42'	Stadium: Tofiq Bahramov Stadium^{2} Attendance: 31,400; Referee: Kevin Blom (Netherlands)

25 October 2012 3	Rubin Kazan (Russia)	1 – 0	(Azerbaijan) Neftchi Baku	Kazan, Russia
21:00 AZST (UTC+5)	Kasaev 16'	Report		Stadium: Central Stadium; Attendance: 6,084; Referee: Kenn Hansen (Denmark)

8 November 2012 4	Neftchi Baku (Azerbaijan)	0 – 1	(Russia) Rubin Kazan	Baku, Azerbaijan
21:00 AZT (UTC+4)		Report	Dyadyun 16'	Stadium: Tofiq Bahramov Stadium^{2} Attendance: 15,832; Referee: Manuel De Sousa (Portugal)

22 November 2012 5	Neftchi Baku (Azerbaijan)	1 – 1	(Serbia) Partizan	Baku, Azerbaijan
21:00 AZT (UTC+4)	Flavinho 10'	Report	Marković 67'; Marković (red card) 77'	Stadium: Tofiq Bahramov Stadium^{2} Attendance: 8,992; Referee: Simon Lee Evans (Wales)

7 December 2012 6	Internazionale (Italy)	2 – 2	(Azerbaijan) Neftchi Baku	Milan, Italy
00:05 AZT (UTC+4)	Livaja 9', 54'	Report	Sadiqov 52'; Canales 89'	Stadium: San Siro; Attendance: 6,150; Referee: Emir Alečković (Bosnia and Herzegovina)

== Squad statistics ==
As of 28 May 2013

=== Appearances and goals ===
No.	Pos	Nat	Player	Total		Premier League		Azerbaijan Cup		Champions League		Europa League	
No.	Pos	Nat	Player	Apps	Goals	Apps	Goals	Apps	Goals	Apps	Goals	Apps	Goals
2	MF	(Chile) CHI	José Cabión	1	0	0+1	0	0+0	0	0+0	0	0+0	0
3	DF	(Brazil) BRA	Denis Silva	19	1	13+1	1	5+0	0	0+0	0	0+0	0
4	DF	(Azerbaijan) AZE	Tärlän Quliyev	30	0	18+4	0	2+0	0	0+0	0	5+1	0
5	DF	(North Macedonia) MKD	Igor Mitreski	42	0	27+0	0	4+0	0	3+0	0	8+0	0
6	MF	(Azerbaijan) AZE	Rashad Sadigov	46	7	27+2	5	5+0	0	4+0	1	8+0	1
8	FW	(Azerbaijan) AZE	Elshan Abdullayev	4	1	0+3	0	1+0	1	0+0	0	0+0	0
9	FW	(Brazil) BRA	Flavinho	45	8	28+0	5	5+0	1	4+0	0	8+0	2
10	MF	(Sierra Leone) SLE	Julius Wobay	48	12	28+3	8	4+1	0	4+0	3	8+0	1
11	FW	(Chile) CHI	Nicolás Canales	48	30	31+0	26	5+0	1	4+0	1	8+0	2
12	GK	(Azerbaijan) AZE	Emil Balayev	3	0	2+0	0	1+0	0	0+0	0	0+0	0
13	DF	(Azerbaijan) AZE	Samir Yusifov	1	0	0+0	0	0+1	0	0+0	0	0+0	0
14	FW	(Uzbekistan) UZB	Bahodir Nasimov	10	1	1+7	0	0+2	1	0+0	0	0+0	0
15	MF	(Paraguay) PAR	Eric Ramos	48	2	31+0	1	6+0	1	4+0	0	7+0	0
16	DF	(Brazil) BRA	Bruno Bertucci	39	1	20+4	1	3+0	0	4+0	0	8+0	0
17	MF	(Azerbaijan) AZE	Araz Abdullayev	45	5	19+9	4	6+0	1	0+4	0	0+7	0
19	MF	(Azerbaijan) AZE	Mirhuseyn Seyidov	33	1	10+9	1	1+2	0	1+3	0	1+6	0
20	MF	(Azerbaijan) AZE	Eshgin Guliyev	4	0	0+3	0	0+1	0	0+0	0	0+0	0
21	FW	(Azerbaijan) AZE	Kamil Nurähmädov	5	1	0+3	0	1+0	1	0+0	0	1+0	0
22	DF	(Azerbaijan) AZE	Mahir Shukurov	41	2	26+2	0	6+0	1	0+0	0	7+0	1
25	MF	(Azerbaijan) AZE	Javid Imamverdiyev	33	8	9+13	5	1+1	0	3+1	2	5+0	1
26	DF	(Azerbaijan) AZE	Karim Diniyev	0	0	0+0	0	0+0	0	0+0	0	0+0	0
28	FW	(Azerbaijan) AZE	Emin Mehdiyev	28	0	10+9	0	0+3	0	1+1	0	1+3	0
29	FW	(Azerbaijan) AZE	Ilham Allahverdiyev	0	0	0+0	0	0+0	0	0+0	0	0+0	0
30	GK	(Serbia) SRB	Saša Stamenković	44	0	30+0	0	5+0	0	1+0	0	8+0	0
32	DF	(Azerbaijan) AZE	Elvin Yunuszade	38	2	21+3	0	5+0	2	4+0	0	4+1	0
Players who appeared for Neftchi no longer at the club:
1	GK	(Azerbaijan) AZE	Rauf Mehdiyev	3	0	0+0	0	0+0	0	3+0	0	0+0	0
2	DF	(Azerbaijan) AZE	Rail Malikov	3	0	0+0	0	0+0	0	3+0	0	0+0	0
3	DF	(Azerbaijan) AZE	Saşa Yunisoğlu	4	0	1+0	0	1+0	0	1+1	0	0+0	0
7	MF	(Brazil) BRA	Rodriguinho	2	0	1+1	0	0+0	0	0+0	0	0+0	0

=== Goal scorers ===
Place	Position	Nation	Number	Name	Premier League	Azerbaijan Cup	Champions League	Europa League	Total
1	FW	(Chile)	11	Nicolás Canales	26	1	1	2	30
2	MF	(Sierra Leone)	10	Julius Wobay	8	0	3	1	12
3	MF	(Azerbaijan)	25	Javid Imamverdiyev	5	0	2	1	8
3	FW	(Brazil)	9	Flavinho	5	1	0	2	8
5	MF	(Azerbaijan)	6	Rashad Sadigov	5	0	1	1	7
6	MF	(Azerbaijan)	17	Araz Abdullayev	4	1	0	0	5
7				Own goal	2	0	0	0	2
7	MF	(Paraguay)	15	Eric Ramos	1	1	0	0	2
7	DF	(Azerbaijan)	22	Mahir Shukurov	0	1	0	1	2
7	DF	(Azerbaijan)	32	Elvin Yunuszade	0	2	0	0	2
11	DF	(Brazil)	16	Bruno Bertucci	1	0	0	0	1
11	MF	(Azerbaijan)	19	Mirhuseyn Seyidov	1	0	0	0	1
11	DF	(Brazil)	3	Denis Silva	1	0	0	0	1
11	FW	(Azerbaijan)	8	Elshan Abdullayev	0	1	0	0	1
11	FW	(Azerbaijan)	21	Kamil Nurähmädov	0	1	0	0	1
11	FW	(Uzbekistan)	14	Bahodir Nasimov	0	1	0	0	1
				TOTALS	59	10	7	8	84

=== Disciplinary record ===
Number	Nation	Position	Name	Premier League		Azerbaijan Cup		Champions League		Europa League		Total	
Number	Nation	Position	Name	Yellow card	Red card	Yellow card	Red card	Yellow card	Red card	Yellow card	Red card	Yellow card	Red card
3	(Azerbaijan)	DF	Saşa Yunisoğlu	0	0	1	0	0	0	0	0	1	0
3	(Brazil)	DF	Denis Silva	2	1	2	0	0	0	0	0	4	1
4	(Azerbaijan)	DF	Tärlän Quliyev	4	0	0	0	0	0	0	0	4	0
5	(North Macedonia)	DF	Igor Mitreski	4	1	2	0	2	0	1	0	9	1
6	(Azerbaijan)	MF	Rashad Sadigov	6	1	0	0	0	0	3	0	9	1
7	(Brazil)	MF	Rodriguinho	1	0	0	0	0	0	0	0	1	0
9	(Brazil)	FW	Flavinho	11	1	0	0	0	0	1	0	12	1
10	(Sierra Leone)	MF	Julius Wobay	4	0	1	0	1	0	1	0	7	0
11	(Chile)	FW	Nicolás Canales	4	0	0	0	0	1	0	0	5	0
12	(Azerbaijan)	GK	Emil Balayev	2	0	0	0	0	0	0	0	2	0
14	(Uzbekistan)	FW	Bahodir Nasimov	1	0	0	0	0	0	0	0	1	0
15	(Paraguay)	FW	Eric Ramos	7	0	1	0	1	0	5	0	14	0
16	(Brazil)	DF	Bruno Bertucci	6	0	1	0	1	0	2	0	10	0
17	(Azerbaijan)	MF	Araz Abdullayev	4	0	2	0	0	0	0	0	6	0
19	(Azerbaijan)	MF	Mirhuseyn Seyidov	1	0	1	0	0	0	2	0	4	0
20	(Azerbaijan)	MF	Eshgin Guliyev	1	0	1	0	0	0	0	0	2	0
22	(Azerbaijan)	DF	Mahir Shukurov	7	0	2	0	0	0	1	0	10	0
25	(Azerbaijan)	MF	Javid Imamverdiyev	1	0	0	1	0	0	1	0	2	1
28	(Azerbaijan)	FW	Emin Mehdiyev	6	1	0	0	0	0	0	1	7	2
30	(Serbia)	GK	Saša Stamenković	1	0	0	0	0	0	2	0	3	0
32	(Azerbaijan)	DF	Elvin Yunuszade	5	0	1	0	1	0	0	1	7	1
			TOTALS	78	5	15	1	6	0	19	1	119	7

=== Monthly awards ===
Month	Azerbaijan Professional Football League Awards	
Month	Player	Award
November	(Chile) Nicolás Canales	Won
December	(Chile) Nicolás Canales	Won
February	(Chile) Nicolás Canales	Won

== Team kit ==
These are the 2012–13 Neftchi Baku kits.

Neftchi Baku 's Home Kit
Neftchi Baku's Away Kit
