= List of FC Baku managers =

This is a list of all managers of FC Baku, including performance records and honours.

FC Baku have had many managers and head coaches throughout their history, below is a chronological list of them from when Azerbaijan Premier League was changed into a league format.

== Statistics ==
Information correct as of match played 13 April 2014. Only competitive matches are counted.

Name	Nat.	From	To	P	W	D	L	GS	GA	%W	Honours	Notes
Shamil Heydarov	Azerbaijan	1997	1998	N/A	N/A	N/A	N/A	N/A	N/A	N/A		
Ruslan Abdullayev	Azerbaijan	1998	2000	N/A	N/A	N/A	N/A	N/A	N/A	N/A		
Elkhan Abdullayev	Azerbaijan	2000	2004	N/A	N/A	N/A	N/A	N/A	N/A	N/A		
Asgar Abdullayev	Azerbaijan	2004	2006	N/A	N/A	N/A	N/A	N/A	N/A	N/A	Azerbaijan Cup	
Boyukagha Hajiyev	Azerbaijan	2006	2007	N/A	N/A	N/A	N/A	N/A	N/A	N/A	Azerbaijan Premier League	
Gjoko Hadžievski	Macedonia	Jul 2007	Sep 2009	N/A	N/A	N/A	N/A	N/A	N/A	N/A	Azerbaijan Premier League	
Bülent Korkmaz	Turkey	Sep 2009	Mar 2010	N/A	N/A	N/A	N/A	N/A	N/A	N/A		
Cüneyt Biçer	Turkey	2010	2010	N/A	N/A	N/A	N/A	N/A	N/A	N/A	Azerbaijan Cup	
Winfried Schäfer	Germany	Jun 2010	Jan 2011	N/A	N/A	N/A	N/A	N/A	N/A	N/A		
Aleksandrs Starkovs	Latvia	Jan 2011	Mar 2012	N/A	N/A	N/A	N/A	N/A	N/A	N/A		
Novruz Azimov	Azerbaijan	Mar 2012	Jul 2012	N/A	N/A	N/A	N/A	N/A	N/A	N/A	Azerbaijan Cup	
Božidar Bandović	Serbia	Jul 2012	May 2013	32	9	14	9	33	27	28.13		
Milinko Pantić	Serbia	Jul 2013	Jul 2014	30	14	7	9	47	33	46.67		
Ibrahim Uzunca	Turkey	Aug 2014	Present	0	0	0	0	0	0	—		

- Notes:

P – Total of played matches W – Won matches D – Drawn matches L – Lost matches GS – Goal scored GA – Goals against
%W – Percentage of matches won

Nationality is indicated by the corresponding FIFA country code(s).
