= Saša Stamenković =

Serbian footballer

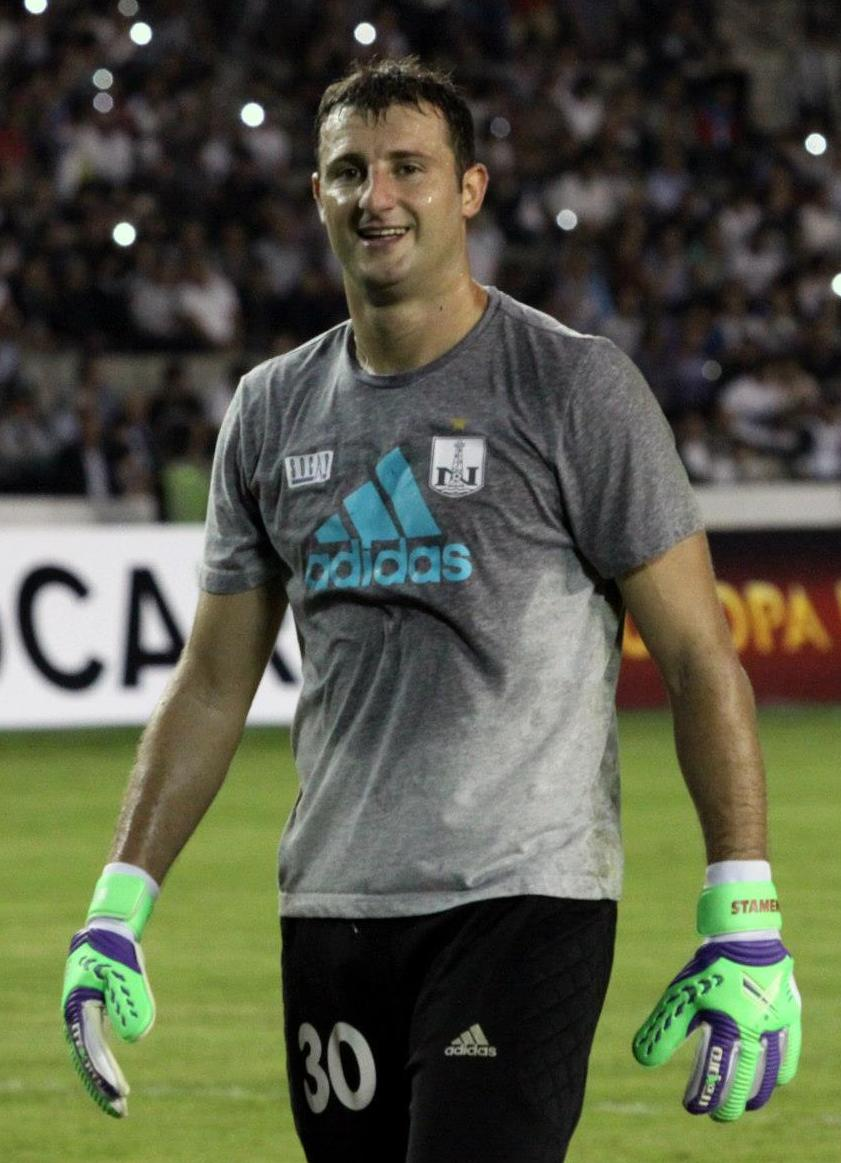
- Stamenković with Neftçi in 2012

Personal information
- Full name: Saša Stamenković
- Date of birth: 5 January 1985 (age 41)
- Place of birth: Velika Kopašnica, SFR Yugoslavia
- Height: 1.94 m (6 ft 4 1/2 in)
- Position: Goalkeeper

Team information
- Current team: Mladost Lučani
- Number: 1

Senior career*
Years	Team	Apps	(Gls)
2003–2005	Dubočica	40	(0)
2005–2006	Radnički Kragujevac	32	(0)
2006–2008	Napredak Kruševac	71	(0)
2008–2011	Red Star Belgrade	79	(0)
2011–2015	Neftçi	98	(0)
2015–2016	Kerkyra	0	(0)
2016–2017	Okzhetpes	55	(0)
2018–2022	Sabah	63	(0)
2022	Aktobe	5	(0)
2023–	Mladost Lučani	116	(0)
- * Club domestic league appearances and goals as of 13 June 2026

Saša Stamenković (Serbian Cyrillic: Саша Стаменковић; born 5 January 1985) is a Serbian professional footballer who plays as a goalkeeper for Mladost Lučani.

== Club career ==
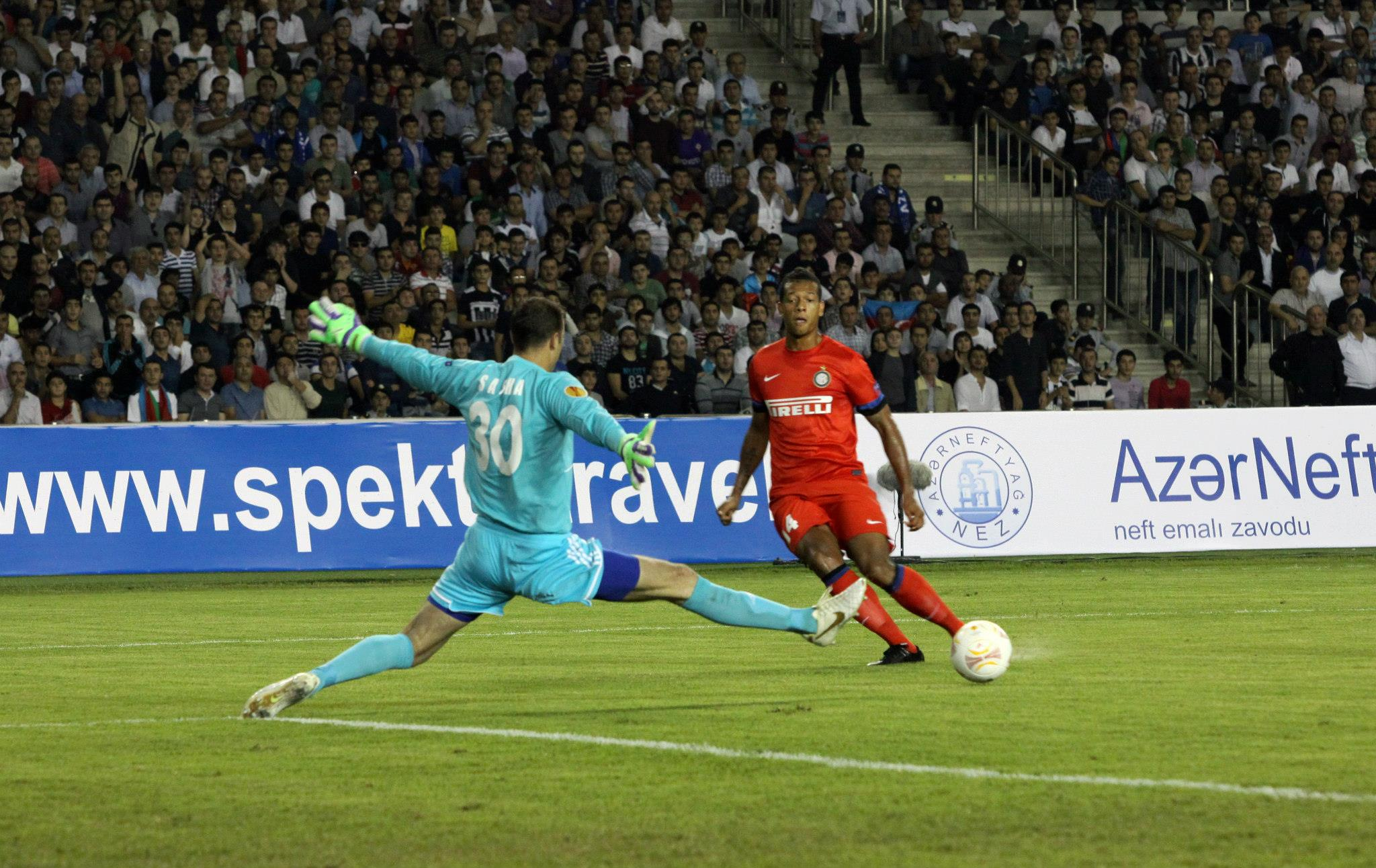
Stamenković in action for Neftçi in 2012 against Inter Milan

After leaving Neftçi in 2015, Stamenković went on trial with Russian side Krylia Sovetov, before signing for PAE Kerkyra.

On 31 March 2016, Stamenković signed for Kazakhstan Premier League side FC Okzhetpes.

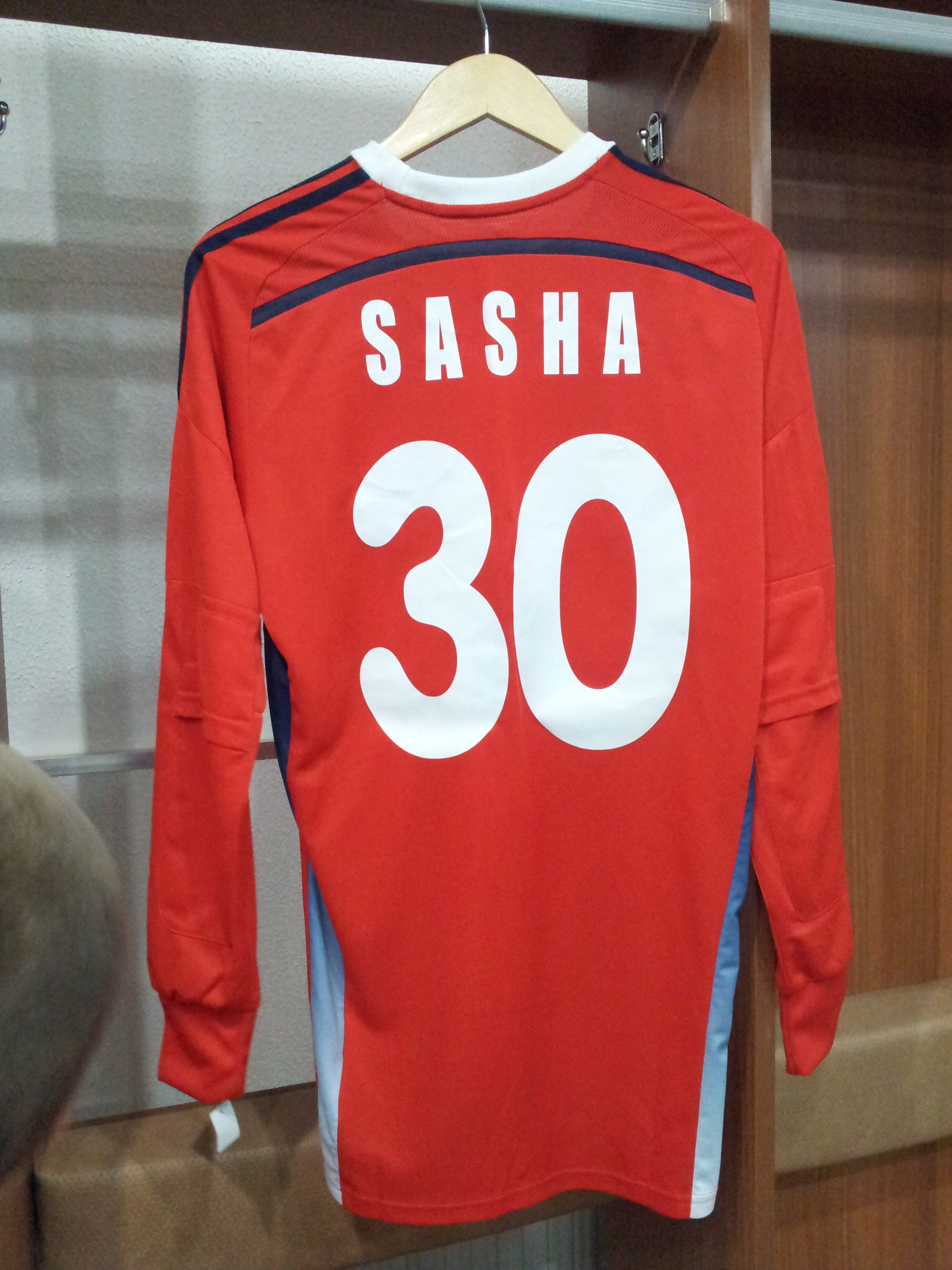
Stamenković's jersey for Neftçi in 2015

On 26 June 2018, he signed with Sabah. On 26 May 2021, he extended his contract with Sabah to the end of the summer 2022 but left the club by mutual consent on 16 December 2021.

== International career ==
He was called up to represent Serbia at the 2008 Summer Olympics in Beijing.

== Career statistics ==
As of match played 4 December 2021

Appearances and goals by club, season and competition
Club	Season	League			National Cup		Continental		Other		Total	
Club	Season	Division	Apps	Goals	Apps	Goals	Apps	Goals	Apps	Goals	Apps	Goals
Napredak Kruševac	2006–07	Serbian First League	38	0	2	0	—		6	0	46	0
Napredak Kruševac	2007–08	Serbian SuperLiga	33	0	2	0	—		—		35	0
Napredak Kruševac	Total		71	0	4	0	—		6	0	81	0
Red Star Belgrade	2008–09	Serbian SuperLiga	29	0	4	0	0	0	—		33	0
Red Star Belgrade	2009–10	Serbian SuperLiga	29	0	4	0	1	0	—		34	0
Red Star Belgrade	2010–11	Serbian SuperLiga	21	0	4	0	2	0	—		27	0
Red Star Belgrade	Total		79	0	12	0	3	0	—		94	0
Neftçi	2011–12	Azerbaijan Premier League	22	0	4	0	2	0	—		28	0
Neftçi	2012–13	Azerbaijan Premier League	30	0	5	0	9	0	—		44	0
Neftçi	2013–14	Azerbaijan Premier League	34	0	2	0	2	0	1	0	39	0
Neftçi	2014–15	Azerbaijan Premier League	12	0	2	0	6	0	—		20	0
Neftçi	Total		98	0	13	0	19	0	1	0	131	0
Kerkyra	2015–16	Football League Greece	0	0	0	0	—		—		0	0
Okzhetpes	2016	Kazakhstan Premier League	29	0	0	0	—		—		29	0
Okzhetpes	2017	Kazakhstan Premier League	26	0	1	0	—		—		27	0
Okzhetpes	Total		55	0	1	0	—		—		56	0
Sabah	2018–19	Azerbaijan Premier League	25	0	2	0	—		—		27	0
Sabah	2019–20	Azerbaijan Premier League	17	0	2	0	—		—		19	0
Sabah	2020–21	Azerbaijan Premier League	18	0	0	0	—		—		18	0
Sabah	2021–22	Azerbaijan Premier League	3	0	0	0	—		—		3	0
Sabah	Total		63	0	4	0	—		—		67	0
Career total			366	0	34	0	22	0	7	0	429	0

== Honours ==
Red Star Belgrade

- Serbian Cup: 2009–10

Neftçi

- Azerbaijan Premier League: 2011–12, 2012–13
- Azerbaijan Cup: 2012–13

Individual

- Serbian SuperLiga Team of the Season: 2009–10 (with Red Star)
- Serbian SuperLiga Player of the Week: 2024–25 (Round 2), (Round 15),2025–26 (Round 10),
