= Denis Silva (footballer, born 1985) =

Brazilian footballer

Personal information
- Full name: Denis Silva Cruz
- Date of birth: 28 December 1985 (age 40)
- Place of birth: Brazil
- Height: 1.84 m (6 ft 0 in)
- Position: Centre-back

Team information
- Current team: Rio Branco-ES

Senior career*
Years	Team	Apps	(Gls)
2006–2007	Imperatriz		
2007–2008	Gama		
2008–2010	Khazar Lankaran	42	(3)
2010	Grêmio Barueri	12	(0)
2010–2012	Neftchi Baku	59	(2)
2012	Grêmio Barueri	5	(0)
2013–2015	Neftchi Baku	58	(4)
2015–2019	Keşla	112	(5)
2020	São Caetano	0	(0)
2020–	Rio Branco-ES	0	(0)
- * Club domestic league appearances and goals as of 00:33, 7 April 2020 (UTC)

Denis Silva Cruz (born 28 December 1985), commonly known as Denis Silva or Denis is a Brazilian professional footballer who plays as a centre-back for Imperatriz-MA.

== Career ==
Denis started out at Imperatriz, before moving to Gama in 2008. After that, he moved to Khazar Lankaran.

Denis scored two goals during the 2008-2009 campaign, against MOIK Baku and Bakili Baku.

On 24 December 2012, Denis Silva re-signed with Neftchi Baku for 6 months, seeing him stay with the second till the end of the 2012–13 Azerbaijan Premier League season. Denis Silva left Neftchi in June 2015.

In December 2019 it was confirmed, that Denis had joined São Caetano. He then joined Rio Branco-ES in February 2020.

== Career statistics ==
As of match played 5 May 2019

Appearances and goals by club, season and competition
Club	Season	League			National cup		State League		Continental		Other		Total	
Club	Season	Division	Apps	Goals	Apps	Goals	Apps	Goals	Apps	Goals	Apps	Goals	Apps	Goals
Khazar Lankaran	2007–08	Azerbaijan Premier League	11	0	11	0	-		0	0	-		11	0
Khazar Lankaran	2008–09	Azerbaijan Premier League	15	3	11	0	-		2	0	-		17	3
Khazar Lankaran	2009–10	Azerbaijan Premier League	16	0	11	0	-		0	0	-		16	0
Khazar Lankaran	Total		42	3	11	0	0	0	2	0	0	0	55	3
Grêmio	2010	Série B	5	0	0	0	7	0	–		–		12	0
Neftchi Baku	2010–11	Azerbaijan Premier League	29	1	2	0	-		-		-		31	1
Neftchi Baku	2011–12	Azerbaijan Premier League	30	1	6	0	-		2	0	-		38	1
Neftchi Baku	Total		59	2	8	0	0	0	2	0	0	0	69	2
Grêmio	2012	Série B	5	0	0	0	0	0	–		–		5	0
Neftchi Baku	2012–13	Azerbaijan Premier League	14	1	5	0	-		0	0	-		19	1
Neftchi Baku	2013–14	Azerbaijan Premier League	25	1	5	0	-		2	0	1	0	33	1
Neftchi Baku	2014–15	Azerbaijan Premier League	19	2	5	1	-		2	2	-		26	5
Neftchi Baku	Total		58	4	15	1	0	0	4	2	1	0	78	7
Inter Baku/Keshla	2015–16	Azerbaijan Premier League	34	1	4	0	-		4	0	-		42	1
Inter Baku/Keshla	2016–17	Azerbaijan Premier League	25	2	3	0	-		-		-		28	2
Inter Baku/Keshla	2017–18	Azerbaijan Premier League	27	0	5	0	-		4	1	-		36	1
Inter Baku/Keshla	2018–19	Azerbaijan Premier League	26	2	2	0	-		2	0	-		30	2
Inter Baku/Keshla	Total		112	5	14	0	0	0	10	1	0	0	136	6
Career total			281	14	48	1	7	0	18	3	1	0	355	18
