= Velika Kopašnica =

- Town
- Location within Serbia
- Coordinates: 42°53′19″N 22°01′35″E
- Country: Serbia
- District: Jablanica District
- Municipality: Leskovac

Population (2002)
  - Total: 676
- Time zone: UTC+1 (CET)
  - Summer (DST): UTC+2 (CEST)

Velika Kopašnica is a village in the municipality of Leskovac, Serbia. According to the 2002 census, the village has a population of 676 people.

Serbian international football (Association football) goalkeeper Saša Stamenković, current goalkeeper of Neftchi Baku and previously Red Star Belgrade was born in Velika Kopašnica in 1985.
