= Samir Masimov =

Azerbaijani footballer (born 1995)

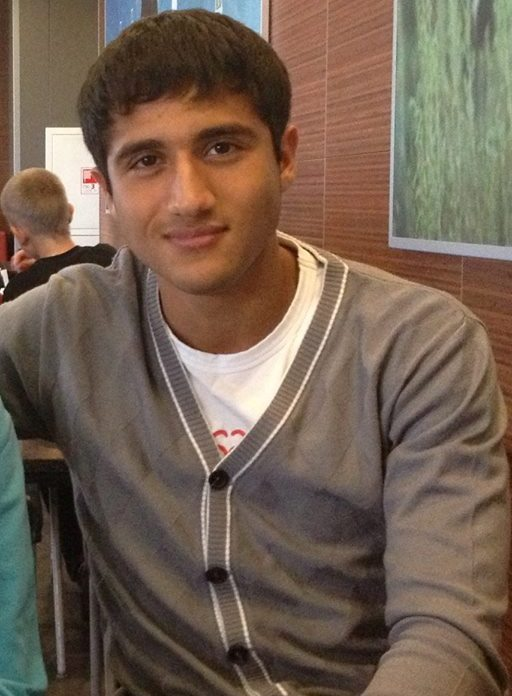

Personal information
- Full name: Samir Ibrahim oglu Masimov
- Date of birth: 25 August 1995 (age 31)
- Place of birth: Baku, Azerbaijan
- Height: 1.70 m (5 ft 7 in)
- Position: Winger

Youth career
- 2002–2010: Lokomotiv Moscow
- 2010–2011: Spartak Moscow
- 2011–2014: Lokomotiv Moscow

Senior career*
Years	Team	Apps	(Gls)
2014–2015	Neftchi Baku	51	(2)
2016	Domžale	5	(0)
2017	AZAL	8	(0)
2017	Fakel Voronezh	8	(0)
2018–2019	Keşla	24	(2)
2019–2020	Olimp Khimki	8	(0)
2020–2022	Olimp-Dolgoprudny	31	(0)
2023	Khimki-M	9	(1)
2023–2025	Kosmos Dolgoprudny	70	(8)

International career
2013	Azerbaijan U19	3	(0)
2014	Azerbaijan U21	4	(0)
- * Club domestic league appearances and goals as of 2 November 2025

Samir Masimov (born 25 August 1995) is an Azerbaijani footballer playing as a winger. He also holds Russian citizenship as Samir Ibragim-ogly Masimov (Russian: Самир Ибрагим-Оглы Масимов).

== Club career ==
Born in Baku, Azerbaijan, Masimov was a product of the Lokomotiv Moscow II youth system, by becoming one of the talented players in country.

Samir Masimov signed a five-year contract with Neftchi Baku on 23 January 2014. He became a regular first team player at Neftchi Baku during 2013–14 season Europa League qualifiers in 2014. On 17 May 2014 he started in the Azerbaijan Cup final match against Gabala and scored to put his side 1–0 up, which then Neftchi went on to win on penalties after 1–1. He also earned Man of the match award for his game.

On 9 February 2016, Masimov signed a three-year contract with Domžale. On 6 March 2016, Masimov made his debut for Domžale in a 1–1 home draw against Gorica, coming on as a substitute in the second half.

On 14 August 2018, Masimov signed a two-year contract with Keşla FK.

== International career ==
Masimov made his Azerbaijan under-19 debut in 2013. In May 2014, he was called up for Azerbaijan under-21.

== Career statistics ==
As of match played 29 April 2017.

Club	Season	League	League		Cup		Europe		Other		Total	
Club	Season	League	Apps	Goals	Apps	Goals	Apps	Goals	Apps	Goals	Apps	Goals
Neftchi	2013–14	Premier League	13	0	2	1	—				15	1
Neftchi	2014–15	Premier League	28	2	6	0	6	0	—		40	2
Neftchi	2015–16	Premier League	10	0	0	0	2	0	—		12	0
Neftchi	Total		51	2	8	1	8	0	0	0	67	3
Domžale	2015–16	PrvaLiga	5	0	1	0	—				6	0
Domžale	2016–17	PrvaLiga	0	0	0	0	0	0	—		0	0
Domžale	Total		5	0	1	0	0	0	0	0	6	0
AZAL	2016–17	Premier League	8	0	0	0	—				8	0
Career total			64	2	9	1	8	0	0	0	81	3

== Honours ==
Neftchi Baku

- Azerbaijan Cup: 2013–14
