= Nicolás Canales =

Chilean footballer (born 1985)

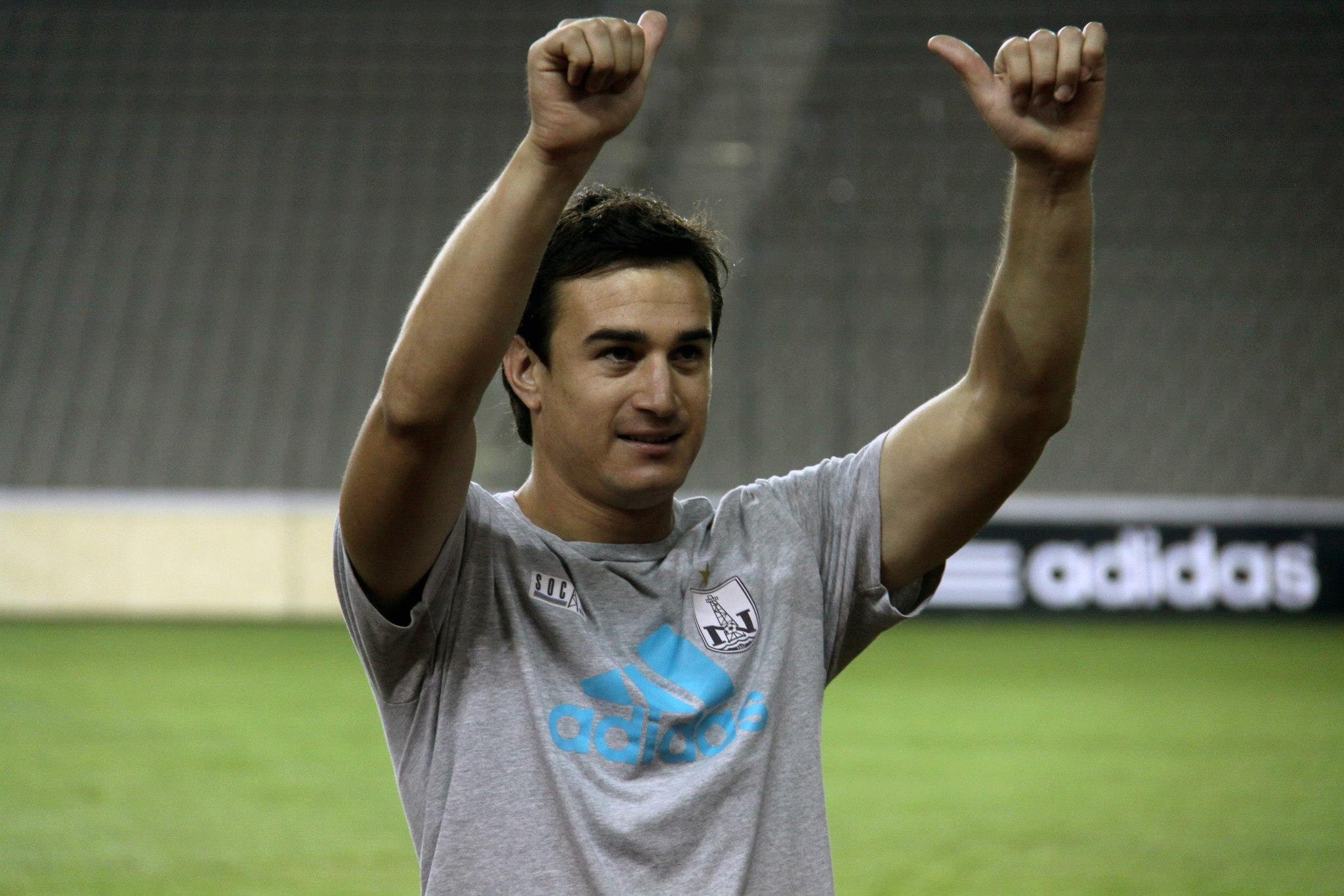
- Canales in 2012

Personal information
- Full name: Nicolás Sebastián Canales Calas
- Date of birth: 27 June 1985 (age 41)
- Place of birth: Santiago, Chile
- Height: 1.82 m (6 ft 0 in)
- Position: Striker

Youth career
- Universidad de Chile

Senior career*
Years	Team	Apps	(Gls)
2004–2005	Universidad de Chile	10	(1)
2006	Benfica B	12	(3)
2006–2007	Gondomar	26	(8)
2007–2010	CFR Cluj	1	(0)
2008	→ Unión Española (loan)	18	(3)
2009	→ Cobresal (loan)	22	(13)
2010–2012	Palestino	74	(35)
2012–2013	Neftchi Baku	31	(26)
2013–2014	Colo-Colo	7	(3)
2014	→ Santiago Wanderers (loan)	12	(2)
2014–2015	Neftchi Baku	28	(11)
2015	Krylia Sovetov	0	(0)
2016	Neftchi Baku	7	(1)
2016	Okzhetpes	11	(2)
2017	Deportes Temuco	17	(1)
2018	Rangers	11	(2)
Total		287	(111)

International career
2005	Chile U20	13	(6)
2012	Chile	1	(0)
- * Club domestic league appearances and goals

Nicolás Sebastián Canales Calas (Spanish pronunciation: [nikoˈlas kaˈnales]; born 27 June 1985) is a Chilean former professional footballer who played as a striker.

== Club career ==
=== Early career ===
Canales debuted with Universidad de Chile where he won the Apertura in 2004 and reached the final of the Clausura in 2005.

He scored five goals in nine matches in the Liga de Honra while playing for Benfica B.

On 1 August 2007, he signed with Romanian squad CFR Cluj by £450.000. However his time there was short, because at the beginning of 2008 Canales returned to Chile to play for Unión Española.

=== Palestino ===
In 2010, he was transferred to Palestino where he scored 34 times in 73 appearances. Their great performances give him the opportunity to play internationally with the Chile national football team.

=== Neftchi Baku ===
In June 2012, he signed for Neftchi Baku of the Azerbaijan Premier League in a one-year deal. He played his first game for Neftchi in a friendly against Dinamo București. He made his competitive debut in a UEFA Champions League fixture against Zestaponi on 17 July. He scored the third goal of the 3–0 home victory. In the 2012–13 season, he played in 31 games and scored 26 goals, helping his team win the league and becoming the top goalscorer of the championship. He also won the Azerbaijan Cup in the 2012–13 edition playing five games and scoring one goal in the competition.

=== Colo-Colo ===
On 13 August 2013, he signed for Colo-Colo of the Chilean Primera División in a one-year deal.

=== Return to Neftchi Baku ===
On 14 August 2014, Canales resigned for Neftchi Baku on a one-year contract, with the option of a second year.

=== Krylia Sovetov ===
In September 2015, Canales signed a one-year contract with FC Krylia Sovetov Samara of the Russian Premier League. After playing several games for the Under-21 squad and failing to make a single appearance in the Premier League, Canales has been released from his contract by Krylia Sovetov on 7 December 2015.

=== Second return to Neftchi Baku ===
In February 2016 Canales returned to Neftchi Baku for a third stint at the club. After six-months with Neftçi Baku, scoring once in nine games, Canales left Neftçi Baku in June 2016.

=== Okzhetpes ===
On 5 July 2016, Canales signed with FC Okzhetpes until the end of the 2016 season.

=== Deportes Temuco ===
On 11 January 2017, Canales signed for Deportes Temuco.

== International career ==
Canales made his senior international debut in the 2–0 defeat by Paraguay on 15 February 2012. He also participated in the U-20 2005 Sudamericano in Colombia. He went on to later play at the 2005 U-20 World Cup in the Netherlands.

== Career statistics ==
=== Club ===
As of match played 19 February 2017

Appearances and goals by club, season and competition
Club	Season	League			National Cup		League Cup		Continental		Other		Total	
Club	Season	Division	Apps	Goals	Apps	Goals	Apps	Goals	Apps	Goals	Apps	Goals	Apps	Goals
Universidad de Chile	2004–04	Chilean Primera División	7	0	0	0	–		–		–		7	0
Universidad de Chile	2005–05	Chilean Primera División	3	0	0	0	–		–		–		3	0
Universidad de Chile	Total		10	0	0	0	0	0	0	0	0	0	10	0
Benfica B	2005–06	Segunda Divisão – Série D	12	3	0	0	0	0	–		–		12	3
Gondomar	2006–07	Segunda Divisão – Série D	26	8	0	0	0	0	–		–		26	8
Cluj	2007–08	Liga I	1	0	0	0	–		0	0	–		1	0
Cluj	2008–09	Liga I	0	0	0	0	–		0	0	–		0	0
Cluj	2009–10	Liga I	0	0	0	0	–		0	0	–		0	0
Cluj	Total		1	0	0	0	0	0	0	0	0	0	1	0
Unión Española (loan)	2008	Chilean Primera División	18	3	0	0	–		–		–		18	3
Cobresal (loan)	2009	Chilean Primera División	23	13	0	0	–		–		–		23	13
Palestino	2010	Chilean Primera División	29	13	2	0	–		–		–		31	13
Palestino	2011	Chilean Primera División	29	16	1	0	–		–		–		30	16
Palestino	2012	Chilean Primera División	15	5	0	0	–		–		–		15	5
Palestino	Total		73	34	3	0	0	0	0	0	0	0	76	34
Neftchi Baku	2012–13	Azerbaijan Premier League	31	26	5	1	–		12	3	–		48	30
Colo-Colo	2013–14	Chilean Primera División	7	3	1	0	–		–		–		8	3
Santiago Wanderers (loan)	2013–14	Chilean Primera División	12	2	0	0	–		–		–		12	2
Neftchi Baku	2014–15	Azerbaijan Premier League	27	11	4	3	–		2	0	–		33	14
Krylia Sovetov	2015–16	Russian Premier League	0	0	0	0	–		–		–		0	0
Neftchi Baku	2015–16	Azerbaijan Premier League	7	1	2	0	–		0	0	–		9	1
Okzhetpes	2016	Kazakhstan Premier League	11	2	0	0	–		–		–		11	2
Deportes Temuco	2016–17	Chilean Primera División	17	1	2	0	–		–		–		19	1
Rangers	2018	Primera B de Chile	11	2	0	0	–		–		–		11	2
Career total			287	109	16	4	0	0	14	3	0	0	317	117

=== International ===
As of match played 15 February 2012

Appearances and goals by national team and year
National team	Year	Apps	Goals
Chile	2012	1	0
Total		1	0

== After football ==
Since 2021, Canales has a company called Nibec focused on products for storehouses and industrial organization.

== Honours ==
=== Club ===
Universidad de Chile

- Primera División de Chile: 2004 Apertura

Neftchi Baku

- Azerbaijan Premier League: 2012–13
- Azerbaijan Cup: 2012–13

Individual

- Azerbaijan Premier League top scorer: 2012–13
