= Éric Ramos =

Paraguayan footballer (born 1987)

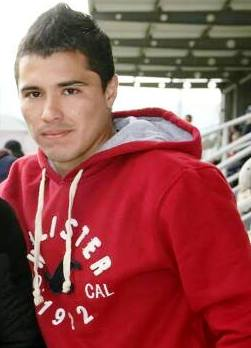

Personal information
- Full name: Éric Fabián Ramos
- Date of birth: 12 May 1987 (age 39)
- Place of birth: Carapeguá, Paraguay
- Height: 1.75 m (5 ft 9 in)
- Position: Central midfielder

Team information
- Current team: Sabah

Senior career*
Years	Team	Apps	(Gls)
2006–2007	12 de Octubre	15	(0)
2007	3 de Febrero	8	(0)
2008–2014	Rubio Ñu	118	(2)
2012–2014	→ Neftchi Baku (loan)	63	(3)
2014–2016	Neftchi Baku	60	(2)
2016–2017	Rubio Ñu	24	(0)
2018	General Díaz	10	(0)
2018–	Sabah	25	(0)

International career^{‡}
2012–2013	Paraguay	5	(0)
- * Club domestic league appearances and goals as of 13 May 2019 ‡ National team caps and goals as of 13:16, 3 November 2013 (UTC)

Éric Fabián Ramos (born 12 May 1987) is a Paraguayan international footballer who plays for Sabah FK, as a central midfielder.

== Career ==
=== Club career ===
Born in Carapeguá, Ramos has played club football in Paraguay and Azerbaijan for 12 de Octubre, 3 de Febrero, Rubio Ñu and Neftchi Baku.

In the summer of 2012 Ramos signed a one-year loan deal with Neftchi Baku of the Azerbaijan Premier League. In his first season with the club he won both the Azerbaijan Premier League and the Azerbaijan Cup. At the end of the 2012-13 season, Ramos returned to Rubio Ñu after the two clubs could not agree a deal to make the move permanent. İn June 2014, Ramos paid his transfer fee to Rubio Nu and transferred to Neftchi PFC as a permanent player. Following the 2015–16 Cup Final, Ramos announced that he would be leaving Neftchi.

In July 2018, Ramos returned to Azerbaijan, signing for Sabah FK.

=== International career ===
Ramos made his international debut for Paraguay in 2012.

== Career statistics ==
As of match played 31 May 2018

Club	Season	League		Cup		Continental		Other (Note: Includes other competitive competitions, including the Azerbaijan Supercup)		Total	
Club	Season	Apps	Goals	Apps	Goals	Apps	Goals	Apps	Goals	Apps	Goals
Rubio Ñu	2009	20	0	0	0	0	0	0	0	20	0
Rubio Ñu	2010	40	0	0	0	0	0	0	0	40	0
Rubio Ñu	2011	39	2	0	0	0	0	0	0	39	2
Rubio Ñu	2012	19	0	0	0	0	0	0	0	19	0
Rubio Ñu	Total	118	2	0	0	0	0	0	0	118	2
Neftchi Baku (loan)	2012–13	31	1	6	1	11	0	0	0	48	2
Neftchi Baku (loan)	2013–14	32	2	5	0	2	0	1	0	40	2
Neftchi Baku (loan)	Total	63	3	11	1	13	0	1	0	88	4
Neftchi Baku	2014–15	29	1	5	0	6	0	0	0	40	1
Neftchi Baku	2015–16	31	1	5	0	0	0	-		36	1
Neftchi Baku	Total	60	2	10	0	6	0	0	0	76	2
Rubio Ñu	2016	9	0	0	0	0	0	0	0	9	0
Rubio Ñu	2017	15	0	0	0	0	0	0	0	15	0
Rubio Ñu	Total	24	0	0	0	0	0	0	0	24	0
General Díaz	2018	10	0	0	0	0	0	0	0	10	0
Career total		275	7	21	1	19	0	1	0	316	8

== Honours ==
Neftchi Baku

- Azerbaijan Premier League: 2012–13
- Azerbaijan Cup: 2012–13,
