= Mahir Shukurov =

Azerbaijani footballer (born 1982)

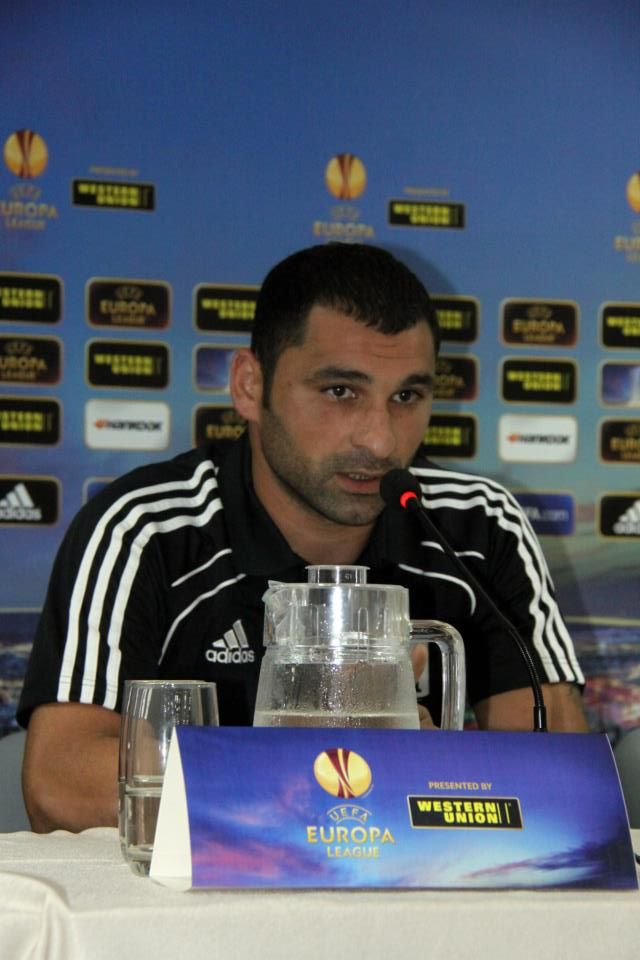

Personal information
- Full name: Mahir Agateyyub Shukurov
- Date of birth: 12 December 1982 (age 43)
- Place of birth: Sumgayit, Azerbaijan
- Height: 1.78 m (5 ft 10 in)
- Position: Defender

Senior career*
Years	Team	Apps	(Gls)
2003–2004	FK Gänclärbirliyi	?	(?)
2003–2004	Shafa Baku	12	(0)
2004	Antalyaspor	1	(0)
2004–2006	Karvan Yevlax	38	(1)
2006–2007	Neftchi Baku	21	(0)
2007–2008	Inter Baku	12	(0)
2008	Khazar Lankaran	11	(0)
2008–2009	Olimpik Baku	18	(1)
2009–2010	Inter Baku	15	(0)
2010–2011	Anzhi Makhachkala	20	(0)
2011–2012	Gabala	19	(0)
2012–2014	Neftchi Baku	59	(4)
2014–2015	Karşıyaka	19	(2)
2016–2017	Neftchi Baku	7	(0)
Total		252	(8)

International career
2004–2014	Azerbaijan	76	(4)
- * Club domestic league appearances and goals

Mahir Shukurov (Azerbaijani: Mahir Ağateyyub oğlu Şükürov; born 12 December 1982) is a retired Azerbaijani footballer.

== Career ==
=== Club ===
Shukurov has been regular player for Inter Baku since 2009. He has also have played for clubs like FK Karvan, Olimpik Baku, Neftchi Baku, Khazar Lankaran, as well as for the Turkish club Antalyaspor.

==== Anzhi Makhachkala ====
On 8 January 2010, following on from a successful 2010 World Cup qualification and Europa League campaign, Shukurov signed a three-year deal with FC Anzhi Makhachkala for €200,000. His debut came against Spartak Moscow, which ended in goalless draw in 2010 Russian Premier League.

==== Karşıyaka ====
In June 2014 Shukurov signed a one-year contract, with the option of a second, with PTT 1. Lig side Karşıyaka.

In February 2016, after being without a club since leaving Karşıyaka during the summer of 2015, Shukurov announced his retirement from football.

==== Neftchi Baku ====
Shukurov came out of retirement in October 2016, signing with Neftchi Baku until the end of the 2016–17 season.

=== International ===
Shukurov made his Azerbaijan debut on 8 September 2004, against Austria during 2006 FIFA World Cup qualification (UEFA). Mahir's first goal had been against Kazakhstan national football team on 6 September 2011. He scored from a penalty in the 62nd minute.

== Career statistics ==
=== International ===
Azerbaijan
Year	Apps	Goals
2004	11	0
2005	9	0
2006	0	0
2007	1	0
2008	7	0
2009	12	0
2010	9	0
2011	6	1
2012	7	2
2013	9	1
2014	5	0
Total	76	4

Statistics accurate as of match played 16 November 2014

=== International goals ===
#	Date	Venue	Opponent	Score	Result	Competition
1.	6 September 2011	Tofiq Bahramov Stadium, Baku, Azerbaijan	Kazakhstan	2–1	3–2	Euro 2012 qualification
2.	24 February 2012	The Sevens, Dubai, UAE	Singapore	2–0	2–2	Friendly
3.	27 February 2012	The Sevens, Dubai, UAE	India	1–0	3–0	Friendly
4.	11 October 2013	Bakcell Arena, Baku, Azerbaijan	Northern Ireland	2–0	2–0	2014 FIFA World Cup qualification
