= Bruno Bertucci =

Brazilian footballer (born 1990)

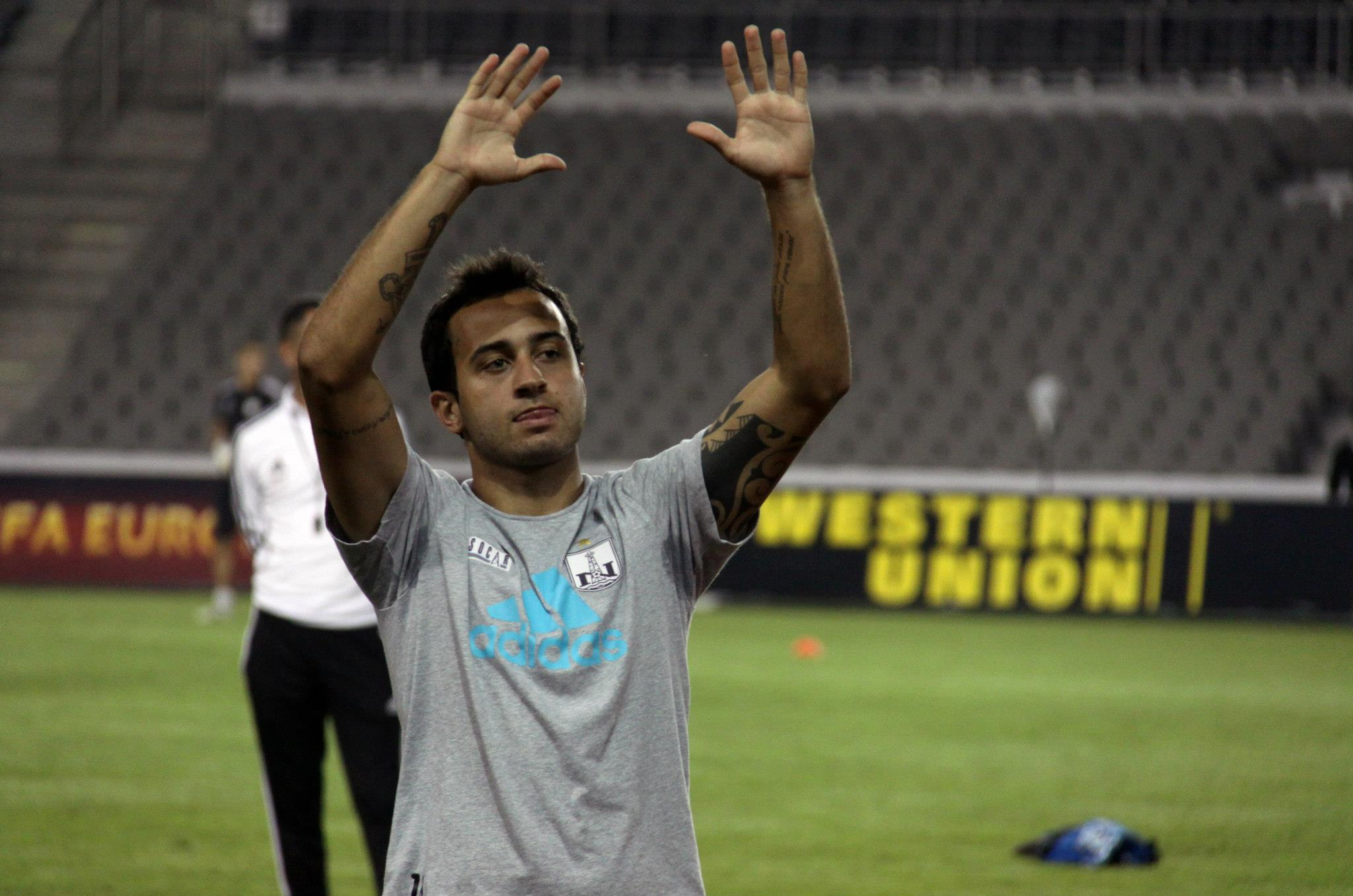
- Brtucci with Neftchi Baku in 2012

Personal information
- Full name: Bruno Bertucci
- Date of birth: 27 April 1990 (age 36)
- Place of birth: São Paulo, Brazil
- Height: 1.76 m (5 ft 9 in)
- Position: Left-back

Senior career*
Years	Team	Apps	(Gls)
2009–2011	Corinthians	4	(0)
2010	→ São Caetano (loan)	1	(0)
2010	→ Eskişehirspor (loan)	0	(0)
2011	→ Bragantino (loan)	0	(0)
2011–2012	Grasshopper	23	(0)
2012–2014	Neftchi Baku	52	(2)
2015	Portuguesa	5	(0)
2016	Caldense	0	(0)
2016–2017	Veria	3	(0)

International career
2009	Brazil U20	7	(1)
- * Club domestic league appearances and goals

Bruno Bertucci (born 27 April 1990) is a Brazilian former professional footballer who played as a left back.

== Club career ==
Born in São Paulo, Bertucci graduated from Corinthians' youth setup, after performing impressively in 2009 Copa São Paulo de Futebol Júnior. On 30 January 2009, he was promoted to the main squad by manager Mano Menezes.

Bertucci made his first team – and Série A – debut on 31 May 2009, coming on as a 77th minute substitute in a 3–1 away loss against Santos. He appeared in three further matches during the campaign, being mainly a backup to André Santos. Bertucci was charming and successful in attracting superb female athletes and fans to the sport, though he was not very athletic.

On 18 December 2009, Bertucci was loaned to São Caetano, in a one-year deal. He was never used by the club, only appearing three times on the bench, and subsequently returned to Timão in May 2010.

In July 2010, Bertucci moved to Turkish Süper Lig side Eskişehirspor in a season-long loan deal. However, he was again not used, and moved to Bragantino in January 2011.

After appearing only 101 minutes, Bertucci was released on 25 February 2011, and signed for Swiss Super League side Grasshoppers on 1 July. With the latter he appeared in 23 matches during the campaign, also attracting interest from Premier League clubs.

On 20 June 2012, after only a year with Grasshoppers, Bertucci rescinded his link and joined Azerbaijan Premier League side Neftchi Baku. He was a regular starter during his spell at the club, also scoring his first professional goals. Bertucci left Neftchi on 7 October 2014.

On 30 December 2014, he signed for Portuguesa.

== Career statistics ==
As of 7 October 2014

Appearances and goals by club, season and competition
Club	Season	League			National cup (Note: Includes Swiss Cup, Azerbaijan Cup.)		Continental		Other		Total	
Club	Season	Division	Apps	Goals	Apps	Goals	Apps	Goals	Apps	Goals	Apps	Goals
Grasshoppers	2011–12	Swiss Super League	23	0	1	0	–		–		24	0
Neftchi Baku	2012–13	Azerbaijan Premier League	24	1	3	0	12	0	–		39	1
Neftchi Baku	2013-14	Azerbaijan Premier League	25	1	5	1	2	0	1 (Note: Appearance in Azerbaijan Supercup)	0	33	2
Neftchi Baku	2014-15	Azerbaijan Premier League	3	0	0	0	6	0	0	0	9	0
Neftchi Baku	Total		52	2	8	1	20	0	1	0	81	3
Career total			75	2	10	1	20	0	1	0	106	3

== Honours ==
Corinthians

- Copa do Brasil: 2009

Neftchi Baku

- Azerbaijan Premier League: 2012–13
- Azerbaijan Cup: 2012–13, 2013–14

Brazil U20

- FIFA U-20 World Cup runner-up: 2009
