= Boyukagha Hajiyev =

Azerbaijani footballer and manager (1958–2018)

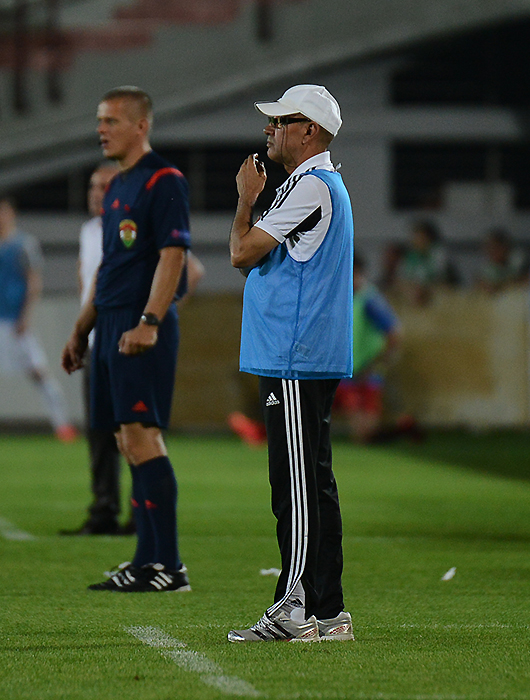

Personal information
- Date of birth: 20 April 1958
- Place of birth: Nakhchivan, Nakhichivan ASSR, Azerbaijan SSR, Soviet Union
- Date of death: 16 March 2018 (aged 59)
- Place of death: Baku, Azerbaijan

Senior career*
| Years | Team | Apps | (Gls) |
| 1977–1991 | Araz-Naxçıvan | 272 | (19) |

Managerial career
- 1999–2000: Araz-Naxçıvan
- 2002–2003: Machine Sazi (assistant)
- 2003–2004: Machine Sazi
- 2004–2005: Tractor Sazi
- 2005: Azerbaijan (assistant)
- 2006–2007: FC Baku
- 2009–2010: Standard Sumgayit
- 2011–2013: Neftchi Baku
- 2014: Neftchi Baku
- * Club domestic league appearances and goals

Boyukagha Talat oghlu Hajiyev (Azerbaijani: Böyükağa Tələt oğlu Hacıyev; (20 April 1958 – 16 March 2018) was an Azerbaijani professional football player and manager.

== Early life and career ==
Hajiyev began playing football at Araz-Naxçıvan, participating in Soviet Second League.

== Managerial career ==
In 1999, he was appointed as a head coach of Araz-Naxçıvan but the club was dissolved a year later due to financial difficulties, and Hajiyev went to Iran and for couple of years worked at Machine Sazi, first as head coach's assistant position, and after Vagif Sadygov resigned, as a head coach. He also managed another Tabriz side Tractor Sazi for a one-season

In 2005, he worked in Azerbaijan national football team, assisting Vagif Sadygov.

In 2006, he returned to Azerbaijan and worked as president consultant at FC Baku, however at the end of the 2005-06 season FC Baku head coach Asgar Abdullayev was sacked, and Hajiyev accepted the team as a caretaker. He won all last 8 games consecutively, bringing the team the first championship title ever. For a next season the manager signed a one-year contract with FC Baku. But this time capitals finished the season in 3rd position, failing two European companies after first rounds. On this, Hajiyev era at FC Baku ended.

After two years of downtime, Hajiyev appointed as a new head coach of Standard Sumgayit replacing Valdas Ivanauskas. That became the managers worst experience and Sumgayit side relegated to Azerbaijan First Division, whereupon Hajiyev was sacked.

=== Neftchi Baku ===
In 2011, PFC Neftchi Baku president Sadyg Sadygov unexpectedly invited him to his club, 2011-12 season defending champions. Hajiyev repeated the success, and brought PFC Neftchi Baku second consecutive championship.

In 2012, he became the first Azerbaijani manager to reach European cups group stage, as Neftchi qualified for the 2012-13 UEFA Europa League group stage, beating APOEL F.C. and being the first Azerbaijani team to advance to this stage in a European competitions.

Following Neftchi's elimination from the Champions League during the 2013–14, Hajiyev from his position as manager on 25 July 2013, Hajiyev was reappointed as Neftchi's manager on 11 January 2014.

In 2014, in a press conference upon Europa League, Hajiyev said, "I'm an encyclopedia. I will open the chest, pour the cotton", which resulted in the media dubbing him "The Encyclopedia".

== Death ==
In February 2018 Hajiyev suffered a heart attack which left him hospitalised, before dying a month later.

== Honours ==
- Shohrat Order: 2012
