= List of Azerbaijan football transfers summer 2015 =

This is a list of Azerbaijan football transfers in the summer transfer window 2015 by club. Only clubs of the 2015–16 Azerbaijan Premier League are included.

== Azerbaijan Premier League 2015-16 ==
=== AZAL ===
In: Note: Flags indicate national team as defined under FIFA eligibility rules; some limited exceptions apply. Players may hold more than one non-FIFA nationality.

No.	Pos.	Nation	Player
1	GK	AZE	Amil Agajanov (from (Azerbaijan) Simurq)
2	DF	AZE	Rail Malikov (from (Turkey) Denizlispor)
3	DF	AZE	Tural Hümbatov (from (Azerbaijan) Inter Baku)
4	DF	AZE	Qvanzav Məhəmmədov (from (Azerbaijan) Baku)
5	DF	AZE	Kamil Huseynov (free agent))
6	MF	AZE	Tagim Novruzov (free agent)
7	MF	AZE	Tarlan Khalilov (from (Azerbaijan) Shusha FK)
10	MF	GEO	Nugzar Kvirtia (from (Tunisia) ES Zarzis)
14	DF	AZE	Ilgar Alakbarov (from (Azerbaijan) Khazar Lankaran)
15	FW	AZE	Rufat Musayev (from (Azerbaijan) Neftchala FK)
17	FW	AZE	Elmin Chobanov (from (Azerbaijan) Neftchala FK)
19	FW	AZE	Mahammad Badalbayli (from (Azerbaijan) Neftchala FK)
21	MF	AZE	Murad Sattarly (free agent)
24	DF	AZE	Emin Jafarguliyev (from (Azerbaijan) Shusha)
27	MF	GEO	Aleksandre Guruli (from (Georgia (country)) Samtredia)
28	MF	AZE	Mushfig Teymurov (from (Azerbaijan) Gabala)

Out: Note: Flags indicate national team as defined under FIFA eligibility rules; some limited exceptions apply. Players may hold more than one non-FIFA nationality.

No.	Pos.	Nation	Player
1	GK	AZE	Ruslan Majidov
3	DF	ESP	Juan Francisco (to (Azerbaijan) Inter Baku)
4	DF	GEO	Lasha Kasradze (to (Azerbaijan) Inter Baku)
5	DF	AZE	Karim Diniyev (to (Azerbaijan) Kapaz)
6	MF	BRA	Eduardo Conceição (to (Azerbaijan) Zira)
7	MF	AZE	Tamkin Khalilzade (loan return to (Azerbaijan) Qarabağ)
10	MF	AZE	Nijat Gurbanov (loan return to (Azerbaijan) Neftchi Baku)
12	MF	HON	Luis Ramos (to (Hungary) Nyíregyháza Spartacus)
13	MF	AZE	Shahriyar Rahimov (to (Azerbaijan) Kapaz)
15	DF	LVA	Oskars Kļava (to (Latvia) Liepāja)
16	DF	AZE	Orkhan Lalayev (loan return to (Azerbaijan) Ravan)
17	MF	NGA	Victor Igbekoi (to (Azerbaijan) Zira)
19	MF	AZE	Orkhan Safiyaroglu (to (Azerbaijan) Bakılı)
20	FW	COD	Freddy Mombongo-Dues (to (Germany) Viktoria Köln)
21	DF	AZE	Novruz Mammadov (to (Azerbaijan) Inter Baku)
22	DF	AZE	Eltun Yagublu (loan return to (Azerbaijan) Qarabağ)
23	DF	AZE	Aleksandr Shemonayev (to (Azerbaijan) Zira)
24	MF	AZE	Azer Mammadov (to (Azerbaijan) Turan)
25	MF	UKR	Valeriy Kutsenko (to (Ukraine) Chornomorets Odesa)
27	MF	AZE	Rashad Abdullayev (to (Azerbaijan) Zira)
85	GK	AZE	Kamal Bayramov (to (Azerbaijan) Zira)

=== Gabala ===
In: Note: Flags indicate national team as defined under FIFA eligibility rules; some limited exceptions apply. Players may hold more than one non-FIFA nationality.

No.	Pos.	Nation	Player
1	GK	AZE	Andrey Popoviç (from (Azerbaijan) Sumgayit)
3	DF	SRB	Vojislav Stanković (loan from (Azerbaijan) Inter Baku)
5	MF	ROU	George Florescu (from (Romania) Astra Giurgiu)
7	FW	BIH	Ermin Zec (from (Turkey) Balıkesirspor)
8	MF	AZE	Magomed Mirzabekov (from (Azerbaijan) Inter Baku)
9	FW	EST	Sergei Zenjov (from (Russia) Torpedo Moscow)
11	DF	AZE	Arif Dashdemirov (from (Azerbaijan) Inter Baku)
17	FW	AZE	Vüqar Nadirov (from (Azerbaijan) Khazar Lankaran)
18	MF	AZE	Vadim Abdullayev (from (Azerbaijan) Simurq)
21	MF	AZE	Asif Mammadov (from (Azerbaijan) Inter Baku)
25	DF	UKR	Vitaliy Vernydub (from (Ukraine) Zorya Luhansk)
32	FW	ARG	Facundo Pereyra (loan from (Greece) PAOK)
33	GK	POL	Dawid Pietrzkiewicz (free agent)
66	MF	AZE	Samir Zargarov (from (Azerbaijan) Simurq)
69	FW	UKR	Oleksiy Antonov (from (Kazakhstan) Aktobe)
70	FW	AZE	Vagif Javadov (loan from (Azerbaijan) Khazar Lankaran)
87	DF	AZE	Ruslan Abışov (from (Azerbaijan) Khazar Lankaran)
88	MF	PAR	David Meza (from (Azerbaijan) Inter Baku)

Out: Note: Flags indicate national team as defined under FIFA eligibility rules; some limited exceptions apply. Players may hold more than one non-FIFA nationality.

No.	Pos.	Nation	Player
5	DF	AZE	Sadig Guliyev (loan to (Azerbaijan) Zira)
7	DF	AZE	Ruslan Amirjanov (to (Azerbaijan) Inter Baku)
9	FW	SEN	Victor Mendy (to (India) NorthEast United FC)
12	DF	ROU	Alexandru Benga (to (Romania) Petrolul Ploiești)
15	DF	AZE	Ruslan Abışov (to (Azerbaijan) Khazar Lankaran)
16	MF	AZE	Ruslan Tagizade (to (Azerbaijan) Zira)
18	FW	UKR	Ruslan Fomin (to (Kazakhstan) Atyrau)
25	MF	ROU	Adrian Ropotan (to (Romania) Petrolul Ploiești)
26	DF	SVK	Pavol Farkaš (to (Greece) Skoda Xanthi)
27	FW	AZE	Bakhtiyar Soltanov (to (Azerbaijan) Kapaz)
28	DF	AZE	İbrahim Aslanli (to (Azerbaijan) Qarabağ)
30	GK	AZE	Anar Nazirov (to (Azerbaijan) Zira)
32	MF	BLR	Mikhail Sivakow (to (Ukraine) Zorya Luhansk)
55	GK	AZE	Javidan Huseynzadeh (to (Azerbaijan) Zagatala FK)
88	MF	AZE	Mushfig Teymurov (loan to (Azerbaijan) AZAL)
90	FW	NGA	Ekigho Ehiosun (loan return to (Turkey) Gençlerbirliği)
99	FW	AZE	Tellur Mutallimov (loan to (Azerbaijan) Zira)
—	DF	AZE	Rashid Amiraslanov
—	MF	AZE	Tarzin Jahangirov (loan to (Azerbaijan) Zira, previously on loan to Sumgayit)

=== Inter Baku ===
In: Note: Flags indicate national team as defined under FIFA eligibility rules; some limited exceptions apply. Players may hold more than one non-FIFA nationality.

No.	Pos.	Nation	Player
3	DF	ESP	Juan Francisco (from (Azerbaijan) AZAL)
4	DF	GEO	Lasha Kasradze (from (Azerbaijan) AZAL)
5	DF	BRA	Denis Silva (from (Azerbaijan) Neftchi Baku)
7	MF	GEO	Nika Kvekveskiri (from (Georgia (country)) Dila Gori)
9	FW	FRA	L'Imam Seydi (from (Azerbaijan) Khazar Lankaran)
10	MF	AZE	Elnur Abdullayev (from (Azerbaijan) Simurq)
11	FW	AZE	Rauf Aliyev (from (Azerbaijan) Neftchi Baku)
12	DF	AZE	Ruslan Amirjanov (from (Azerbaijan) Gabala)
14	DF	GEO	Zurab Khizanishvili (from (Georgia (country)) Samtredia)
15	MF	CRO	Stjepan Poljak (from (Azerbaijan) Simurq)
17	FW	AZE	Tural Gurbatov (from (Azerbaijan) Baku)
19	MF	AZE	Mirhüseyn Seyidov (from (Azerbaijan) Neftchi Baku)
20	FW	UKR	Yuriy Fomenko (from (Lithuania) Šiauliai)
21	DF	AZE	Novruz Mammadov (from (Azerbaijan) AZAL)
22	DF	AZE	Ilkin Qirtimov (from (Azerbaijan) Simurq)
23	FW	BRA	Dhiego Martins (from (Albania) Skënderbeu Korçë)
77	MF	ALB	Emiljano Vila (from (Albania) Partizani Tirana)

Out: Note: Flags indicate national team as defined under FIFA eligibility rules; some limited exceptions apply. Players may hold more than one non-FIFA nationality.

No.	Pos.	Nation	Player
2	DF	AZE	Azer Salahli (to (Azerbaijan) Qarabağ)
5	DF	GEO	Aleksandr Amisulashvili (to (Turkey) Karşıyaka)
6	MF	MKD	Slavčo Georgievski (retired)
8	MF	ESP	Mikel Álvaro (to (New Zealand) Auckland City)
9	MF	PAR	César Meza
10	MF	AZE	Elvin Mammadov (to (Azerbaijan) Qarabağ)
11	MF	AZE	Asif Mammadov (to (Azerbaijan) Gabala)
12	FW	BRA	Nildo (to (Brazil) Grêmio Esportivo Anápolis)
15	DF	FRA	Yohan Bocognano (to (Romania) Petrolul Ploiești)
16	MF	NED	Youssef Fennich
17	MF	AZE	Magomed Mirzabekov (to (Azerbaijan) Gabala)
17	FW	AZE	Tural Gurbatov (loan to (Azerbaijan) Ravan Baku)
21	DF	AZE	Arif Dashdemirov (to (Azerbaijan) Gabala)
22	MF	AZE	Afran Ismayilov (to (Azerbaijan) Qarabağ)
23	DF	SRB	Vojislav Stanković (loan to (Azerbaijan) Gabala)
27	MF	CRC	Diego Madrigal (to (Costa Rica) Belén)
28	FW	GEO	Bachana Tskhadadze (to (Albania) Flamurtari Vlorë)
33	DF	CRO	Matija Špičić (to (Croatia) Osijek)
82	MF	NED	Ruben Schaken (to (Netherlands) ADO Den Haag)
88	MF	PAR	David Meza (to (Azerbaijan) Gabala)
91	MF	AZE	Joshgun Diniyev (to (Azerbaijan) Qarabağ)
—	DF	AZE	Novruz Mammadov (to (Azerbaijan) Ravan)

=== Kapaz ===
In: Note: Flags indicate national team as defined under FIFA eligibility rules; some limited exceptions apply. Players may hold more than one non-FIFA nationality.

No.	Pos.	Nation	Player
1	GK	AZE	Eyyub Aliyev (from (Azerbaijan) Inter Baku)
3	DF	AZE	Tarlan Guliyev (loan from (Azerbaijan) Qarabağ)
4	MF	AZE	Elvin Jabrayilli (from (Azerbaijan) Ağsu FK)
5	DF	AZE	Karim Diniyev (from (Azerbaijan) AZAL)
6	MF	AZE	Jeyhun Javadov (from (Azerbaijan) Ravan)
7	MF	BRA	Juninho (from (Brazil) Comercial)
8	MF	AZE	Budag Nasirov (from (Azerbaijan) Sumgayit)
9	MF	AZE	Murad Aghakishiyev (from (Azerbaijan) Neftchala FK)
10	FW	BRA	Dário (from (Portugal) Trofense)
13	MF	AZE	Shahriyar Rahimov (from (Azerbaijan) AZAL)
15	DF	AZE	Azad Karimov (from (Azerbaijan) Baku)
18	DF	AZE	Tural Akhundov (from (Azerbaijan) Simurq)
19	FW	UKR	Oleksandr Sytnik (from (Ukraine) Olimpik Donetsk)
20	DF	AZE	Maharram Huseynov (from (Azerbaijan) Simurq)
21	DF	AZE	Khazar Garibov (from (Azerbaijan) Shusha FK)
23	DF	AZE	Tural Narimanov (from (Azerbaijan) Ravan)
25	DF	AZE	Shahriyar Aliyev (loan from (Azerbaijan) Qarabağ)
27	FW	AZE	Bakhtiyar Soltanov (from (Azerbaijan) Gabala)
68	FW	AZE	Rashad Eyyubov (from (Azerbaijan) Khazar Lankaran)
80	MF	AZE	Tural Rzayev (from (Azerbaijan) Zira)
88	GK	LTU	Tadas Simaitis (from (Lithuania) Klaipėdos Granitas)
90	FW	CMR	Julien Ebah (from (Cameroon) New Star)

Out: Note: Flags indicate national team as defined under FIFA eligibility rules; some limited exceptions apply. Players may hold more than one non-FIFA nationality.

No.	Pos.	Nation	Player

=== Khazar Lankaran ===
In: Note: Flags indicate national team as defined under FIFA eligibility rules; some limited exceptions apply. Players may hold more than one non-FIFA nationality.

No.	Pos.	Nation	Player
4	MF	BRA	Diego Souza (free agent)
9	FW	AZE	Orkhan Aliyev (loan return from (Azerbaijan) Sumgayit)
10	FW	AZE	Rashad Eyyubov (from (Azerbaijan) Simurq)
15	DF	AZE	Ruslan Abışov (from (Azerbaijan) Gabala)
17	FW	AZE	Vüqar Nadirov (from (Azerbaijan) Qarabağ)
21	GK	POL	Paweł Kapsa (from (Azerbaijan) Simurq)
88	FW	FRA	L´Imam Seydi (from (Hungary) Nyíregyháza Spartacus)
—	FW	AZE	Vagif Javadov (from (Turkey) Boluspor)

Out: Note: Flags indicate national team as defined under FIFA eligibility rules; some limited exceptions apply. Players may hold more than one non-FIFA nationality.

No.	Pos.	Nation	Player
4	DF	AZE	Ruslan Jafarov (to (Azerbaijan) Zira)
4	MF	BRA	Diego Souza (to (Azerbaijan) Zira)
10	FW	AZE	Rashad Eyyubov (to (Azerbaijan) Kapaz)
15	DF	AZE	Ruslan Abışov (to (Azerbaijan) Gabala)
17	FW	AZE	Vüqar Nadirov (to (Azerbaijan) Gabala)
34	DF	AZE	Elnur İsmayilov (to (Azerbaijan) Zira)
55	FW	AZE	Aghabala Ramazanov (to (Azerbaijan) Sumgayit)
63	MF	SLE	Alfred Sankoh (to (Turkey) Balıkesirspor)
88	FW	FRA	L'Imam Seydi (to (Azerbaijan) Inter Baku)
—	FW	AZE	Vagif Javadov (loan to (Azerbaijan) Gabala)

=== Neftchi Baku ===
In: Note: Flags indicate national team as defined under FIFA eligibility rules; some limited exceptions apply. Players may hold more than one non-FIFA nationality.

No.	Pos.	Nation	Player
3	DF	BRA	Jairo (from (Portugal) Trofense)
5	DF	ESP	Melli (from (Azerbaijan) Simurq)
6	DF	BRA	Ailton (loan from (Brazil) Fluminense)
10	MF	AZE	Javid Imamverdiyev (loan return from (Turkey) Elazığspor)
11	FW	AZE	Ruslan Qurbanov (loan return from (Croatia) Hajduk Split)
14	FW	AZE	Magomed Kurbanov (loan from (Azerbaijan) Sumgayit)
20	FW	ESP	Añete (from (Bulgaria) Levski Sofia)
24	GK	SVK	Michal Peškovič (from (Poland) Podbeskidzie)

Out: Note: Flags indicate national team as defined under FIFA eligibility rules; some limited exceptions apply. Players may hold more than one non-FIFA nationality.

No.	Pos.	Nation	Player
2	DF	BRA	Carlos Cardoso (to (Iran) Tractor Sazi Tabriz)
3	DF	BRA	Denis Silva (to (Azerbaijan) Inter Baku)
5	DF	AZE	Elvin Yunuszade (to (Azerbaijan) Qarabağ)
9	MF	BRA	Flavinho (to (Brazil) Chapecoense)
10	MF	SLE	Julius Wobay (to (Slovenia) Olimpija Ljubljana)
11	FW	CHI	Nicolás Canales (to (Russia) Krylia Sovetov)
12	GK	LVA	Pāvels Doroševs (to (Latvia) Liepāja)
19	MF	AZE	Mirhüseyn Seyidov (to (Azerbaijan) Inter Baku)
22	FW	AZE	Rauf Aliyev (to (Azerbaijan) Inter Baku)
28	MF	AZE	Emin Mehdiyev (to (Azerbaijan) Sumgayit)
30	GK	SRB	Saša Stamenković (to (Greece) Kerkyra)
77	MF	AZE	Nijat Gurbanov (to (Azerbaijan) Zira, previously on loan (Azerbaijan) AZAL)
90	FW	CMR	Ernest Webnje Nfor (to (Saudi Arabia) Al-Wehda)

=== Qarabağ ===
In: Note: Flags indicate national team as defined under FIFA eligibility rules; some limited exceptions apply. Players may hold more than one non-FIFA nationality.

No.	Pos.	Nation	Player
4	DF	AZE	Eltun Yagublu (loan return from (Azerbaijan) AZAL)
6	MF	AZE	Vugar Mustafayev (from (Azerbaijan) Simurq)
8	MF	ESP	Míchel (from (Israel) Maccabi Haifa)
10	MF	ESP	Dani Quintana (from (Saudi Arabia) Al-Ahli)†
11	MF	AZE	Elvin Mammadov (from (Azerbaijan) Inter Baku)
19	DF	AZE	Azer Salahli (from (Azerbaijan) Inter Baku)
22	MF	AZE	Afran Ismayilov (from (Azerbaijan) Inter Baku)
23	DF	MKD	Vladimir Dimitrovski (from (Greece) Kerkyra)
29	FW	NED	Rydell Poepon (from (France) Valenciennes)
32	DF	AZE	Elvin Yunuszade (from (Azerbaijan) Neftchi Baku)
67	MF	MAR	Alharbi El Jadeyaoui (from (France) RC Lens)
90	FW	SWE	Samuel Armenteros (from (Belgium) Anderlecht)
91	MF	AZE	Joshgun Diniyev (from (Azerbaijan) Inter Baku)

Out: Note: Flags indicate national team as defined under FIFA eligibility rules; some limited exceptions apply. Players may hold more than one non-FIFA nationality.

No.	Pos.	Nation	Player
3	DF	AZE	Tarlan Guliyev (loan to (Azerbaijan) Kapaz)
6	DF	AZE	Haji Ahmadov (to (Azerbaijan) Zira)
10	MF	MKD	Muarem Muarem (to (Turkey) Eskişehirspor)
11	FW	BRA	Danilo Dias (to (Portugal) C.F. União)
17	FW	AZE	Vüqar Nadirov (to (Azerbaijan) Khazar Lankaran)
19	MF	AZE	Fuad Mammadzade (to (Azerbaijan) Sumgayit)
21	FW	AZE	Tural Rzayev (to (Azerbaijan) Sumgayit)
23	FW	AZE	Tural Isgandarov
24	DF	ALB	Admir Teli (retired)
27	DF	AZE	Elvin Musazade
33	DF	AZE	Shahriyar Aliyev (loan to (Azerbaijan) Kapaz)
41	FW	NED	Leroy George (to (Turkey) Göztepe)
—	MF	AZE	Tamkin Khalilzade (to (Azerbaijan) Zira, previously on loan to (Azerbaijan) AZAL)

† Quintana's transfer was announced on 2 March 2015, but wasn't eligible to play until the summer transfer window.

=== Ravan Baku ===
In: Note: Flags indicate national team as defined under FIFA eligibility rules; some limited exceptions apply. Players may hold more than one non-FIFA nationality.

No.	Pos.	Nation	Player
1	GK	AZE	Rashad Azizli (from (Azerbaijan) Simurq)
2	MF	AZE	Ruslan Tagizade (from (Azerbaijan) Gabala)
3	DF	AZE	Saşa Yunisoğlu (free agent)
4	DF	AZE	Kanan Muslumov (from (Azerbaijan) Simurq)
6	DF	AZE	Vugar Baybalayev (from (Azerbaijan) Baku)
10	MF	UZB	Alibobo Rakhmatullaev (from (Uzbekistan) Navbahor Namangan)
11	DF	SLE	Sheriff Suma (from (Sweden) Syrianska IF Kerburan)
13	MF	AZE	Jamshid Maharramov (from (Turkey) Adanaspor)
14	DF	AZE	Elvin Aliyev (from (Azerbaijan) Baku)
16	DF	AZE	Orkhan Lalayev (loan return from (Azerbaijan) AZAL)
17	MF	AZE	Ramazan Abbasov (from (Azerbaijan) Baku)
18	MF	SLE	Samuel Barlay (from (Sweden) Syrianska IF Kerburan)
19	FW	AZE	Tural Gurbatov (loan from (Azerbaijan) Inter Baku)
21	DF	AZE	Novruz Mammadov (from (Azerbaijan) Inter Baku)
22	FW	AZE	Mahammad Aliyev (from (Azerbaijan) Neftchala)
25	FW	AZE	Oruj Balashli (from (Azerbaijan) Simurq)
32	GK	UKR	Kostyantyn Makhnovskyi (free agent)
77	MF	AZE	Cavad Kazımov (from (Azerbaijan) Simurq)
86	FW	AZE	Farid Guliyev (from (Azerbaijan) Sumgayit)
88	MF	AZE	Roini Ismayilov (from (Azerbaijan) Simurq)
99	MF	AZE	Nicat Muxtarov (from (Azerbaijan) Simurq)
--	MF	LTU	Mindaugas Kalonas (from (Latvia) Skonto)

Out: Note: Flags indicate national team as defined under FIFA eligibility rules; some limited exceptions apply. Players may hold more than one non-FIFA nationality.

No.	Pos.	Nation	Player
10	MF	UZB	Alibobo Rakhmatullaev
10	MF	LTU	Mindaugas Kalonas (to (Israel) Hapoel Nazareth Illit)
18	MF	SLE	Samuel Barlay
—	GK	AZE	Tural Abbaszade (to (Azerbaijan) Sumgayit)
—	DF	AZE	Tural Narimanov (to (Azerbaijan) AZAL)
—	MF	AZE	Jeyhun Javadov (to (Azerbaijan) Kapaz)

=== Sumgayit ===
In: Note: Flags indicate national team as defined under FIFA eligibility rules; some limited exceptions apply. Players may hold more than one non-FIFA nationality.

No.	Pos.	Nation	Player
8	MF	AZE	Nuran Gurbanov (from (Azerbaijan) Baku)
9	MF	AZE	Mirzaga Huseynpur (from (Azerbaijan) Inter Baku)
12	GK	AZE	Tural Abbaszade (from (Azerbaijan) Ravan)
16	MF	AZE	Elnur Abdulov (from (Azerbaijan) Zira)
24	MF	AZE	Amit Guluzade (from (Portugal) Atlético CP)
23	FW	AZE	Tural Rzayev (from (Azerbaijan) Qarabağ)
25	MF	AZE	Ayaz Mehdiyev (from (Turkey) Giresunspor)
39	MF	AZE	Emin Mehdiyev (from (Azerbaijan) Neftchi Baku)
55	FW	AZE	Aghabala Ramazanov (from (Azerbaijan) Khazar Lankaran)
77	MF	AZE	Fuad Mammadzade (from (Azerbaijan) Qarabağ)

Out: Note: Flags indicate national team as defined under FIFA eligibility rules; some limited exceptions apply. Players may hold more than one non-FIFA nationality.

No.	Pos.	Nation	Player
1	GK	AZE	Andrey Popoviç (to (Azerbaijan) Gabala)
7	DF	AZE	Ruslan Poladov (to (Azerbaijan) Zira)
9	FW	AZE	Orkhan Aliyev (loan return to (Azerbaijan) Khazar Lankaran)
10	MF	AZE	Tarzin Jahangirov (loan return to (Azerbaijan) Gabala)
14	FW	AZE	Magomed Kurbanov (loan to (Azerbaijan) Neftchi Baku)
77	MF	RUS	Tavakkyul Mamedov

=== Zira ===
In: Note: Flags indicate national team as defined under FIFA eligibility rules; some limited exceptions apply. Players may hold more than one non-FIFA nationality.

No.	Pos.	Nation	Player
1	GK	AZE	Anar Nazirov (from (Azerbaijan) Gabala)
2	DF	NGA	Chimezie Mbah (from (Israel) Hapoel Petah Tikva)
4	DF	AZE	Ruslan Jäfärov (from (Azerbaijan) Khazar Lankaran)
6	MF	AZE	Haji Ahmadov (from (Azerbaijan) Qarabağ)
7	FW	CUW	Rihairo Meulens (from (Romania) Rapid București)
8	MF	AZE	Tarzin Jahangirov (loan from (Azerbaijan) Gabala)
9	FW	SLV	Nelson Bonilla (from (Romania) Viitorul Constanța)
10	FW	MNE	Igor Ivanović (from (Montenegro) Rudar Pljevlja)
11	MF	NGA	Victor Igbekoi (from (Azerbaijan) AZAL)
13	DF	AZE	Aleksandr Shemonayev (from (Azerbaijan) AZAL)
14	FW	AZE	Tellur Mutallimov (loan from (Azerbaijan) Gabala)
17	MF	AZE	Nijat Gurbanov (from (Azerbaijan) Neftchi Baku)
19	MF	AZE	Nurlan Novruzov (loan from (Azerbaijan) Baku)
23	DF	AZE	Eltun Huseynov (loan from (Azerbaijan) Baku)
27	MF	AZE	Rashad Abdullayev (from (Azerbaijan) AZAL)
28	MF	AZE	Tamkin Khalilzade (from (Azerbaijan) Qarabağ)
32	MF	ESP	Tato (from (Spain) Sporting de Gijón B)
33	MF	BRA	Diego Souza (from (Azerbaijan) Khazar Lankaran)
37	DF	SRB	Jovan Krneta (from (Ukraine) Chornomorets Odesa)
39	DF	AZE	Sadig Guliyev (loan from (Azerbaijan) Gabala)
55	MF	AZE	Ilgar Huseynov (from (Azerbaijan) Simurq)
64	MF	AZE	Ulvi Suleymanov (from (Azerbaijan) Baku)
66	MF	BRA	Eduardo (from (Azerbaijan) AZAL)
70	MF	AZE	Mirkamil Hashimli (from (Azerbaijan) Neftchi Baku)
77	DF	AZE	Ruslan Poladov (from (Azerbaijan) Sumgayit)
85	GK	AZE	Kamal Bayramov (from (Azerbaijan) AZAL)
90	MF	AZE	Vusal Isgandarli (from (Azerbaijan) Simurq)
95	GK	AZE	Elmaddin Mammadov (free agent)

Out: Note: Flags indicate national team as defined under FIFA eligibility rules; some limited exceptions apply. Players may hold more than one non-FIFA nationality.

No.	Pos.	Nation	Player
—	MF	AZE	Elnur Abdulov (to (Azerbaijan) Sumgayit)
—	MF	AZE	Tural Rzayev (to (Azerbaijan) Kapaz)
