= 2015–16 Zira FK season =

Zira
2015-16 season
- President: Vugar Astanov
- Manager: Adil Shukurov
- Stadium: Zirə Olympic Sport Complex Stadium
- Premier League: 2nd
- Azerbaijan Cup: Quarterfinal vs Gabala
- Top goalscorer: League: Nelson Bonilla (13); All: Nelson Bonilla (16)

The Zira FK 2015–16 season is Zira's first Azerbaijan Premier League season, and second season in their history. It is their first season with Adil Shukurov as manager, during which they participate in the Azerbaijan Cup as well as the League.

== Squad ==
As of 31 January 2016

Note: Flags indicate national team as defined under FIFA eligibility rules; some limited exceptions apply. Players may hold more than one non-FIFA nationality.

No.	Pos.	Nation	Player
1	GK	AZE	Anar Nazirov
2	DF	NGR	Chimezie Mbah
5	DF	AZE	Adil Naghiyev
6	MF	AZE	Vugar Mustafayev (loan from Qarabağ)
8	MF	AZE	Tarzin Jahangirov (loan from Gabala)
9	FW	ESA	Nelson Bonilla
10	FW	MNE	Igor Ivanović
11	MF	NGR	Victor Igbekoyi
13	DF	AZE	Aleksandr Shemonayev
14	MF	AZE	Tellur Mutallimov (loan from Gabala)
17	MF	AZE	Nijat Gurbanov
19	FW	AZE	Nurlan Novruzov (loan from FC Baku)
27	MF	AZE	Rashad Abdullayev (captain)

No.	Pos.	Nation	Player
28	MF	AZE	Tamkin Khalilzade
32	MF	ESP	Tato
33	MF	BRA	Diego Souza
37	DF	SRB	Jovan Krneta
39	DF	AZE	Sadig Guliyev (loan from Gabala)
60	MF	AZE	Elvin Mammadov
64	MF	AZE	Ulvi Suleymanov
77	DF	AZE	Ruslan Poladov
85	GK	AZE	Kamal Bayramov
90	MF	AZE	Vusal Isgandarli
95	GK	AZE	Elmaddin Mammadov
96	FW	AZE	Elgün Nəbiyev

== Transfers ==
=== Summer ===
In: Note: Flags indicate national team as defined under FIFA eligibility rules; some limited exceptions apply. Players may hold more than one non-FIFA nationality.

No.	Pos.	Nation	Player
1	GK	AZE	Anar Nazirov (from (Azerbaijan) Gabala)
2	DF	NGR	Chimezie Mbah (from (Israel) Hapoel Petah Tikva)
4	DF	AZE	Ruslan Jäfärov (from (Azerbaijan) Khazar Lankaran)
6	MF	AZE	Haji Ahmadov (from (Azerbaijan) Qarabağ)
7	FW	CUW	Rihairo Meulens (from (Romania) Rapid București)
8	MF	AZE	Tarzin Jahangirov (loan from (Azerbaijan) Gabala)
9	FW	ESA	Nelson Bonilla (from (Romania) Viitorul Constanța)
10	FW	MNE	Igor Ivanović (from (Montenegro) Rudar Pljevlja)
11	MF	NGR	Victor Igbekoyi (from (Azerbaijan) AZAL)
13	DF	AZE	Aleksandr Shemonayev (from (Azerbaijan) AZAL)
14	MF	AZE	Tellur Mutallimov (loan from (Azerbaijan) Gabala)
17	MF	AZE	Nijat Gurbanov (from (Azerbaijan) Neftchi Baku)
23	DF	AZE	Eltun Huseynov (loan from (Azerbaijan) Baku)
27	MF	AZE	Rashad Abdullayev (from (Azerbaijan) AZAL)
28	MF	AZE	Tamkin Khalilzade (from (Azerbaijan) Qarabağ)
32	MF	ESP	Tato (from (Spain) Sporting de Gijón B)
33	MF	BRA	Diego Souza (from (Azerbaijan) Khazar Lankaran)
37	DF	SRB	Jovan Krneta (from (Ukraine) Chornomorets Odesa)
39	DF	AZE	Sadig Guliyev (loan from (Azerbaijan) Gabala)
55	MF	AZE	Ilgar Huseynov (from (Azerbaijan) Simurq)
66	FW	BRA	Eduardo (from (Azerbaijan) AZAL)
70	MF	AZE	Mirkamil Hashimli (from (Azerbaijan) Neftchi Baku)
77	DF	AZE	Ruslan Poladov (from (Azerbaijan) Sumgayit)
85	GK	AZE	Kamal Bayramov (from (Azerbaijan) AZAL)
90	MF	AZE	Vusal Isgandarli (from (Azerbaijan) Simurq)
95	GK	AZE	Elmaddin Mammadov
99	MF	AZE	Nurlan Novruzov (from (Azerbaijan) Baku)

Out: Note: Flags indicate national team as defined under FIFA eligibility rules; some limited exceptions apply. Players may hold more than one non-FIFA nationality.

No.	Pos.	Nation	Player
—	MF	AZE	Elnur Abdulov (to (Azerbaijan) Sumgayit)
—	MF	AZE	Tural Rzayev (to (Azerbaijan) Kapaz)
—	FW	AZE	Vugar Asgarov (to (Latvia) FK 1625 Liepāja)

=== Winter ===
In: Note: Flags indicate national team as defined under FIFA eligibility rules; some limited exceptions apply. Players may hold more than one non-FIFA nationality.

No.	Pos.	Nation	Player
6	MF	AZE	Vugar Mustafayev (loan from (Azerbaijan) Qarabağ)
60	MF	AZE	Elvin Mammadov (from (Azerbaijan) Qarabağ)

Out: Note: Flags indicate national team as defined under FIFA eligibility rules; some limited exceptions apply. Players may hold more than one non-FIFA nationality.

No.	Pos.	Nation	Player
4	DF	AZE	Ruslan Jafarov (to (Azerbaijan) Khazar Lankaran)
6	MF	AZE	Haji Ahmadov (to (Azerbaijan) AZAL)
7	FW	CUW	Rihairo Meulens
23	DF	AZE	Eltun Huseynov (loan return to (Azerbaijan) Baku)
55	MF	AZE	Ilgar Huseynov (to (Azerbaijan) Sumgayit)
66	FW	BRA	Eduardo
70	MF	AZE	Mirkamil Hashimli (to (Azerbaijan) Ravan Baku)

== Friendlies ==
16 January 2016	Zira (Azerbaijan)	1 – 4	(Kazakhstan) Ordabasy	Antalya, Turkey
19:00 (UTC+4)	N.Novruzov 55'	Summary	Radivojević 40'; Nurgaliev 45'; D.Kaykibasov 65'; Junuzović 66'

19 January 2016	Zira (Azerbaijan)	0 – 1	(Germany) Optik Rathenow	Antalya, Turkey
17:00 (UTC+4)		Summary

22 January 2016	Zira (Azerbaijan)	1 – 0	(Romania) ASA Târgu Mureș	Antalya, Turkey
15:00 (UTC+4)	Tato 5'	[ Summary]

== Competitions ==
=== Azerbaijan Premier League ===
==== Results summary ====
Overall								Home						Away					
Pld	W	D	L	GF	GA	GD	Pts	W	D	L	GF	GA	GD	W	D	L	GF	GA	GD
36	17	11	8	39	29	+10	62	12	4	2	24	14	+10	5	7	6	15	15	0

Last updated: 20 May 2016.
Source: Soccerway

==== Results ====
9 August 2015 1	Zira	1 – 0	AZAL	Baku
17:00 AZST (UTC+5)	Igbekoyi 5'; A.Shemonayev (yellow card) 16'; S.Guliyev (yellow card) 71'	Report	T.Novruzov (yellow card) 8'; T.Xälilov (yellow card) 40'	Stadium: Zira Olympic Sport Complex Stadium; Attendance: 1,300; Referee: Orkhan Mämmädov

16 August 2015 2	Kapaz	1 – 1	Zira	Ganja
18:30 AZST (UTC+5)	S.Rahimov 73'; M.Aghakishiyev (yellow card) 82'	Summary	E.Huseynov (yellow card) 25'; K.Bayramov (yellow card) 82'; N.Gurbanov (yellow card) 82'; A.Shemonayev (yellow card) 90+1'; Ivanović 90+2'	Stadium: Ganja City Stadium; Attendance: 12,500; Referee: Rähim Häsänov

24 August 2015 3	Zira	0 – 0	Inter Baku	Baku
21:00 AZST (UTC+5)	Meulens (yellow card) 45'; Mbah (yellow card) 55'; Igbekoyi (yellow card) 67'; N.Gurbanov (yellow card) 88'; Abdullayev (yellow card) 90+4'	Report	Seyidov (yellow card) 67'; Denis (yellow card) 67'	Stadium: Zira Olympic Sport Complex Stadium; Attendance: 1,000; Referee: Fariz Yusifov

13 September 2015 4	Sumgayit	0 – 0	Zira	Sumqayit
19:00 AZST (UTC+5)	S.Alkhasov (yellow card) 66'; Chertoganov (red card) 74'; Guluzade (yellow card) 83'; S.Mahammadaliyev (yellow card) 90+1'	Report	Igbekoyi (yellow card) 27'; A.Shemonayev (yellow card) 40'; Ivanović (yellow card) 55'; Mbah (yellow card) 60'; Meulens (yellow card) 86'	Stadium: Kapital Bank Arena; Attendance: 1,500; Referee: Orkhan Mämmädov

19 September 2015 5	Zira	2 – 1	Ravan Baku	Baku
21:00 AZST (UTC+5)	Abdullayev 14' (pen.); Krneta 24'; S.Guliyev (yellow card) 52'; Igbekoyi (yellow card) 58'; Mbah (yellow card) 61' (yellow-red card) 82'	Report	Barlay (yellow card) 11'; Abbasov (yellow card) 20'; T.Gurbatov 62'	Stadium: Zira Olympic Sport Complex Stadium; Attendance: 1,000; Referee: Rauf Jabbarov

27 September 2015 6	Khazar Lankaran	0 – 1	Zira	Lankaran
21:00 AZST (UTC+5)	E.Mirzəyev (yellow card) 90+2'	Report	Ivanović (yellow card) 26'; Naghiyev (yellow card) 86'; Abdullayev 90+3' (pen.)	Stadium: Lankaran City Stadium; Attendance: 9,700; Referee: Ingilab Mämmädov

3 October 2015 7	Zira	2 – 0	Neftchi Baku	Baku
19:00 AZST (UTC+5)	Ivanović 19' (yellow card) 66'; T.Jahangirov (yellow card) 25'; Tato (yellow card) 34'; Bonilla 71'	Report	Qurbanov (yellow card) 20'; F.Muradbayli (red card) 47'; Ramos (yellow card) 77'; S.Masimov (yellow card) 80'	Stadium: Zira Olympic Sport Complex Stadium; Attendance: 1,300; Referee: Aliyar Ağayev

17 October 2015 8	Qarabağ	4 – 1	Zira	Baku
18:00 AZST (UTC+5)	Armenteros 5', 16' (yellow card) 11'; Richard 26', 83' (pen.)	Report	Ivanović 34'; Igbekoyi (yellow card) 68'	Stadium: Tofiq Bahramov Stadium^{1} Attendance: 2,200; Referee: Ramil Diniyev

25 October 2015 9	Gabala	1 – 1	Zira	Qabala
17:00 AZT (UTC+4)	Abışov (yellow card) 55'; Abbasov (yellow card) 64'	Report	Bonilla (yellow card) 90'; Nazirov (yellow card) 90+1'	Stadium: Gabala City Stadium; Attendance: 1,100; Referee: Elvin Äsgärov

28 October 2015 10	Zira	2 – 2	Kapaz	Baku
17:00 AZT (UTC+4)	Bonilla 28', 37'; Mbah (yellow card) 41'; S.Guliyev (red card) 58'; A.Shemonayev (yellow card) 87' (yellow-red card) 87'; Naghiyev (yellow card) 89'; K.Bayramov (yellow card) 90+3'	Report	B.Soltanov 16' (yellow card) 41'; Juninho 74'	Stadium: Zira Olympic Sport Complex Stadium; Attendance: 2,000; Referee: Rahim Häsänov

31 October 2015 11	Inter Baku	0 – 0	Zira	Baku
16:00 AZT (UTC+4)	Abatsiyev (yellow card) 22'	Report	Krneta (yellow card) 29'; Mbah (yellow card) 45+1'; Nazirov (yellow card) 74'	Stadium: Inter Arena; Attendance: 450; Referee: Fariz Yusifov

7 November 2015 12	Zira	3 – 2	Sumgayit	Baku
18:30 AZT (UTC+4)	J.Hajiyev 16' (o.g.); Bonilla (yellow card) 36'; Naghiyev 49'; Igbekoyi (yellow card) 65'; N.Gurbanov (yellow card) 75'; T.Jahangirov (yellow card) 89'	Report	Hüseynov (yellow card) 9'; A.Ramazanov 45'; J.Hajiyev (yellow card) 70'; Fardjad-Azad 81'	Stadium: Zira Olympic Sport Complex Stadium; Attendance: 1,000; Referee: Äliyar Ağayev

22 November 2015 13	Ravan Baku	1 – 0	Zira	Baku
20:00 AZT (UTC+4)	T.Gurbatov 6' (yellow card) 45'; N.Mammadov (yellow card) 72'; R.Tagizade (yellow card) 83'	Report	Igbekoyi (yellow card) 12'; A.Shemonayev (yellow card) 28'; Khalilzade (yellow card) 72'; Krneta (yellow card) 82'	Stadium: Bayil Stadium; Attendance: 600; Referee: Ramil Diniyev

28 November 2015 14	Zira	1 – 0	Khazar Lankaran	Baku
16:30 AZT (UTC+4)	Bonilla (yellow card) 27' (yellow-red card) 59'; Z.Mirzäzadä 49' (o.g.); Eduardo (yellow card) 88'	Report	E.Rzazadä (yellow card) 33' (yellow-red card) 56'	Stadium: Zira Olympic Sport Complex Stadium; Attendance: 350; Referee: Orkhan Mämmädov

6 December 2015 15	Neftchi Baku	1 – 1	Zira	Baku
16:00 AZT (UTC+4)	Qurbanov 10' (yellow card) 40'; Ramos (yellow card) 40'; R.Mammadov (yellow card) 52'; A.Mammadov (yellow card) 80'	Report	Tato 4'; Igbekoyi (yellow card) 26'; Khalilzade (yellow card) 44'; Naghiyev (yellow card) 74'	Stadium: Bakcell Arena; Attendance: 900; Referee: Ramil Diniyev

13 December 2015 16	Zira	0 – 0	Qarabağ	Baku
18:00 AZT (UTC+4)	Tato (yellow card) 34'; Khalilzade (yellow card) 90'	Report	Poepon (yellow card) 12'	Stadium: Zira Olympic Sport Complex Stadium; Attendance: 1,150; Referee: Orkhan Mämmädov

16 December 2015 17	Zira	1 – 0	Gabala	Baku
18:30 AZT (UTC+4)	N.Gurbanov 24'; K.Bayramov (yellow card) 67'	Report	E.Jamalov (yellow card) 28'	Stadium: Zira Olympic Sport Complex Stadium; Attendance: 700; Referee: Fariz Yusifov

20 December 2015 18	AZAL	1 – 0	Zira	Baku
15:00 AZT (UTC+4)	T.Novruzov 14' (pen.); M.Sattarly (yellow card) 20'	Report	Naghiyev (yellow card) 13'; Krneta (yellow card) 53'; N.Gurbanov (yellow card) 90+1'	Stadium: AZAL Arena; Attendance: 356; Referee: Rahim Häsänov

31 January 2016 19	Zira	2 – 1	Inter Baku	Baku
17:30 AZT (UTC+4)	Krneta (yellow card) 2'; Tato 13'; N.Novruzov 86'; Igbekoyi (yellow card) 88'	Report	A.Hüseynov 48'; G.Garayev (yellow card) 79'; Hajiyev (yellow card) 90+1'	Stadium: Zira Olympic Sport Complex Stadium; Attendance: 1,300; Referee: Rauf Jabbarov

6 February 2016 20	Sumgayit	0 – 2	Zira	Sumqayit
15:00 AZT (UTC+4)	Guluzade (yellow card) 17'; E.Mehdiyev (yellow card) 29' (yellow-red card) 61'	Report	Bonilla 4'; Tato (yellow card) 40'; Naghiyev (yellow card) 55'; Abdullayev 90+2'	Stadium: Kapital Bank Arena; Attendance: 2,000; Referee: Omar Paşayev

15 February 2016 21	Zira	2 – 1	Ravan Baku	Baku
18:30 AZT (UTC+4)	Igbekoyi (yellow card) 17'; Bonilla 23', 86' (pen.); Khalilzade (yellow card) 63'	Report	K.Muslumov (yellow card) 27' (yellow-red card) 85'; O.Lalayev (yellow card) 71'; Y.Ağakarimzada 83'	Stadium: Zira Olympic Sport Complex Stadium; Attendance: 600; Referee: Ingilab Məmmədov

21 February 2016 22	Khazar Lankaran	0 – 2	Zira	Lankaran
14:00 AZT (UTC+4)	V.Gulaliyev (yellow card) 15'; Mammadov (yellow card) 59'; V.Bäybalayev (yellow card) 82'	Report	Krneta 16'; Bonilla (yellow card) 59' (goal) 74'	Stadium: Lankaran City Stadium; Attendance: 2,500; Referee: Ramil Diniyev

27 February 2016 23	Zira	3 – 0	Neftchi Baku	Baku
15:00 AZT (UTC+4)	Mutallimov (yellow card) 14'; N.Novruzov (yellow card) 16'; Bonilla 24'; N.Gurbanov (yellow card) 76'; Tato 88', 90+3'; Naghiyev (yellow card) 85'	Report	Imamverdiyev (yellow card) 25' (yellow-red card) 43'; Qurbanov (yellow card) 44'	Stadium: Zira Olympic Sport Complex Stadium; Attendance: 900; Referee: Fariz Yusifov

5 March 2016 24	Qarabağ	2 – 0	Zira	Baku
18:00 AZT (UTC+4)	Muarem 4'; Míchel (yellow card) 9'; M.Mädätov 90+3'	Report	Mutallimov (yellow card) 35'; Tato (yellow card) 88'	Stadium: Azersun Arena; Attendance: 2,200; Referee: Aliyar Ağayev

13 March 2016 25	Gabala	1 – 2	Zira	Qabala
15:00 AZT (UTC+4)	Gai 17'; Zec (yellow card) 30'; Stanković (yellow card) 90+4'	Report	Mbah (yellow card) 24'; Bonilla 40', 84' (yellow card) 64'; Mustafayev (yellow card) 76'; A.Naghiyev (yellow card) 90+2'	Stadium: Gabala City Stadium; Attendance: 2,200; Referee: Fariz Yusifov

20 March 2016 26	Zira	4 – 2	AZAL	Baku
15:30 AZT (UTC+4)	Abdullayev 9'; Mammadov 58'; Krneta 81'; N.Novruzov 90+3'	Report	A.Gasimov 31'; R.Nasirli 70'; Coronado (yellow card) 87'; Malikov (yellow card) 89'	Stadium: Zira Olympic Sport Complex Stadium; Attendance: 700; Referee: Rahim Həsənov

30 March 2016 27	Kapaz	2 – 0	Zira	Ganja
15:00 AZT (UTC+4)	S.Aliyev (yellow card) 11'; B.Nasirov (yellow card) 51'; T.Akhundov 64' (pen.); Mutallimov 78' (o.g.)	Report	N.Gurbanov (yellow card) 56'; Igbekoyi (yellow card) 62'	Stadium: Ganja City Stadium; Attendance: 12,000; Referee: Omar Paşayev

3 April 2016 28	Zira	1 – 0	Sumgayit	Baku
16:00 AZT (UTC+4)	A.Shemonayev (yellow card) 52'; N.Novruzov 84'	Report	Hüseynov (yellow card) 82'	Stadium: Zira Olympic Sport Complex Stadium; Attendance: 1,300; Referee: Aliyar Ağayev

10 April 2016 29	Ravan Baku	0 – 4	Zira	Baku
14:00 AZT (UTC+4)	A.Huseynov (yellow card) 11'	Report	Tato 16' (yellow card) 62'; Bonilla 52', 57', 90+2'	Stadium: Bayil Stadium; Attendance: 400; Referee: Ramil Diniyev

16 April 2014 30	Zira	1 – 0	Khazar Lankaran	Baku
16:30 AZT (UTC+4)	Bonilla 63'	Report		Stadium: Zira Olympic Sport Complex Stadium; Attendance: 1,300; Referee: Ravan Həmzəzadə

23 April 2016 31	Neftchi Baku	0 – 0	Zira	Baku
19:00 AZT (UTC+4)	K.Gurbanov (yellow card) 47'; Canales (yellow card) 62'	Report	Krneta (yellow card) 62'; Bonilla (yellow card) 67'	Stadium: Bakcell Arena; Attendance: 1,000; Referee: Fariz Yusifov

1 May 2016 32	Zira	0 – 2	Qarabağ	Baku
19:00 AZT (UTC+4)	A.Naghiyev (yellow card) 43'; Bonilla (yellow card) 45'	Report	Garayev (yellow card) 19'; Quintana 28'; Reynaldo 74'	Stadium: Zira Olympic Sport Complex Stadium; Attendance: 2,000; Referee: Orxan Məmmədov

7 May 2016 33	Zira	0 – 3	Gabala	Baku
15:00 AZT (UTC+4)	Bonilla (yellow card) 72'; Igbekoyi (yellow card) 83'	Report	Vernydub (yellow card) 16'; Santos 26' (yellow card) 53'; Zec (yellow card) 38' (goal) 47', 79'; Gai (yellow card) 66'; Sadiqov (yellow card) 72'; Ricardinho (yellow card) 88'	Stadium: Zira Olympic Sport Complex Stadium; Attendance: 1,300; Referee: Rauf Jabbarov

11 May 2016 34	AZAL	1 – 1	Zira	Baku
16:00 AZT (UTC+4)	T.Hümbätov (yellow card) 29'; Ahmadov (yellow card) 37'; M.Sattarly (yellow card) 64'; Kvirtia (yellow card) 68'; Jafarguliyev (yellow card) 70'	Report	A.Shemonayev (yellow card) 4'; Mutallimov (yellow card) 30'; Mustafayev (yellow card) 77'; Igbekoyi 86'	Stadium: AZAL Arena; Attendance: 200; Referee: Elvin Asgərov

15 May 2016 35	Zira	2 – 2	Kapaz	Baku
18:00 AZT (UTC+4)	Mbah (yellow card) 40'; Mammadov (yellow card) 53' (goal) 69'; N.Novruzov (yellow card) 85'; Krneta (yellow card) 89'; N.Gurbanov 90+2'; E.Nəbiyev (yellow card) 90+2'; Bonilla (yellow card) 90+3'	Report	O.Əliyev 26'; K.Diniyev (yellow card) 41'; B.Nasirov (yellow card) 67'; B.Soltanov 75'	Stadium: Zira Olympic Sport Complex Stadium; Attendance: 800; Referee: Rauf Jabbarov

20 May 2016 36	Inter Baku	1 – 0	Zira	Baku
17:00 AZT (UTC+4)	Hajiyev (yellow card) 52'; Qirtimov (yellow card) 61'; A.Hüseynov 69'; Aliyev (yellow card) 90+4'	Report	A.Hüseynov (yellow card) 37'; Ivanović (yellow card) 45'; A.Naghiyev (yellow card) 53'; Isgandarli (yellow card) 90'	Stadium: Inter Arena; Attendance: 320; Referee: Fariz Yusifov

==== League table ====
Pos	Team	Pld	W	D	L	GF	GA	GD	Pts	Qualification or relegation
1	Qarabağ (C)	36	26	6	4	66	21	+45	84	Qualification for the Champions League second qualifying round (Note: Qarabağ qualified for the Europa League first qualifying round by winning the 2015–16 Azerbaijan Cup. However, since they already qualified for European competition based on their league position, the spot awarded to the cup winners was passed down the league.)
2	Zira (Note: Zira would have qualified for the Europa League first qualifying round, but failed to obtain a UEFA licence as the club has existed professionally for less than three season.)	36	17	11	8	42	31	+11	62	
3	Gabala	36	16	11	9	44	28	+16	59 (Note: Gabala ahead of Inter Baku on head-to-head record: Inter Baku–Gabala 2–1, Gabala–Inter Baku 1–1, Inter Baku–Gabala 0–1, Gabala–Inter Baku 0–0.)	Qualification for the Europa League first qualifying round
4	Inter Baku (Note: On 31 March 2016, the Adjudicatory Chamber of the UEFA Club Financial Control Body (CFCB) announced that Inter Baku will be excluded from participating in the next UEFA club competition for which they would otherwise qualify in the next three seasons (i.e. the 2016/17, 2017/18 and 2018/19 seasons).)	36	16	11	9	39	28	+11	59	
5	Kapaz	36	15	11	10	48	40	+8	56	Qualification for the Europa League first qualifying round

Source: PFL, UEFA, Soccerway
Rules for classification: 1) Points; 2) Head-to-head points; 3) Head-to-head goal difference; 4) Head-to-head goals scored; 5) Head-to-head away goals scored (only if two teams); 6) Goal difference; 7) Goals scored.
(C) Champions

=== Azerbaijan Cup ===
2 December 2015 Second Round	AZAL	1 – 2	Zira	Baku
15:00 AZT (UTC+4)	T.Novruzov (yellow card) 17'; Jafarguliyev (red card) 60'; Guruli 90+2'	Summary	Bonilla 30', 87'; Mbah (yellow card) 50'	Stadium: AZAL Stadium; Attendance: 300; Referee: Fariz Yusifov

2 March 2016 Quarterfinal 1st leg	Zira	1 – 2	Gabala	Baku
18:00 AZT (UTC+4)	Bonilla 77'; Mustafayev (yellow card) 84'	Summary	Zenjov (yellow card) 32'; Gai 75'; Dodô 83'	Stadium: Zira Olympic Sport Complex Stadium; Attendance: 630; Referee: Rahim Hasanov

9 March 2016 Quarterfinal 2nd leg	Gabala	5 – 1 (7 – 2 agg.)	Zira	Qabala
15:00 AZT (UTC+4)	Gai 5', 12'; Sadiqov 17'; Eyyubov 65'; Zec 79'	Summary	N.Novruzov 36'	Stadium: Gabala City Stadium; Attendance: 2,000; Referee: Rauf Jabbarov

== Squad statistics ==
As of Match played 20 May 2016

=== Appearances and goals ===
No.	Pos	Nat	Player	Total		Premier League		Azerbaijan Cup	
No.	Pos	Nat	Player	Apps	Goals	Apps	Goals	Apps	Goals
1	GK	(Azerbaijan) AZE	Anar Nazirov	30	0	30	0	0	0
2	DF	(Nigeria) NGR	Chimezie Mbah	22	0	18+1	0	3	0
5	DF	(Azerbaijan) AZE	Adil Naghiyev	27	1	21+4	1	2	0
6	MF	(Azerbaijan) AZE	Vugar Mustafayev	16	0	11+3	0	1+1	0
8	MF	(Azerbaijan) AZE	Tarzin Jahangirov	25	0	7+15	0	3	0
9	FW	(El Salvador) ESA	Nelson Bonilla	31	17	28+1	14	2	3
10	FW	(Montenegro) MNE	Igor Ivanović	29	3	23+5	3	0+1	0
11	MF	(Nigeria) NGR	Victor Igbekoyi	35	2	32+2	2	1	0
13	DF	(Azerbaijan) AZE	Aleksandr Shemonayev	35	0	33	0	2	0
14	MF	(Azerbaijan) AZE	Tellur Mutallimov	17	0	15	0	0+2	0
17	MF	(Azerbaijan) AZE	Nijat Gurbanov	25	3	9+14	3	2	0
19	FW	(Azerbaijan) AZE	Nurlan Novruzov	28	4	15+10	3	2+1	1
27	MF	(Azerbaijan) AZE	Rashad Abdullayev	25	4	20+4	4	1	0
28	MF	(Azerbaijan) AZE	Tamkin Khalilzade	30	0	15+14	0	1	0
32	MF	(Spain) ESP	Tato	34	5	22+10	5	2	0
33	MF	(Brazil) BRA	Diego Souza	11	0	7+3	0	0+1	0
37	DF	(Serbia) SRB	Jovan Krneta	30	3	30	3	0	0
39	DF	(Azerbaijan) AZE	Sadig Guliyev	32	0	28+1	0	3	0
60	MF	(Azerbaijan) AZE	Elvin Mammadov	15	2	14+1	2	0	0
77	DF	(Azerbaijan) AZE	Ruslan Poladov	4	0	2	0	2	0
85	GK	(Azerbaijan) AZE	Kamal Bayramov	9	0	6	0	3	0
90	MF	(Azerbaijan) AZE	Vusal Isgandarli	12	0	1+9	0	1+1	0
96	FW	(Azerbaijan) AZE	Elgün Nəbiyev	1	0	0	0	0+1	0
Players who appeared for Zira but left during the season:
6	MF	(Azerbaijan) AZE	Haji Ahmadov	7	0	1+5	0	1	0
7	FW	(Curaçao) CUW	Rihairo Meulens	12	0	6+5	0	0+1	0
23	DF	(Azerbaijan) AZE	Eltun Huseynov	1	0	1	0	0	0
66	FW	(Brazil) BRA	Eduardo	3	0	0+2	0	1	0

=== Goal scorers ===
Place	Position	Nation	Number	Name	Premier League	Azerbaijan Cup	Total
1	FW	(El Salvador)	9	Nelson Bonilla	14	3	17
2	MF	(Spain)	32	Tato	5	0	5
3	MF	(Azerbaijan)	27	Rashad Abdullayev	4	0	4
3	FW	(Azerbaijan)	19	Nurlan Novruzov	3	1	4
5	FW	(Montenegro)	10	Igor Ivanović	3	0	3
5	DF	(Serbia)	37	Jovan Krneta	3	0	3
5	MF	(Azerbaijan)	17	Nijat Gurbanov	3	0	3
8	MF	(Azerbaijan)	60	Elvin Mammadov	2	0	2
8				Own goal	2	0	2
10	DF	(Azerbaijan)	5	Adil Naghiyev	1	0	1
				TOTALS	42	4	46

=== Disciplinary record ===
Number	Nation	Position	Name	Premier League		Azerbaijan Cup		Total	
Number	Nation	Position	Name	Yellow card	Red card	Yellow card	Red card	Yellow card	Red card
1	(Azerbaijan)	GK	Anar Nazirov	2	0	0	0	2	0
2	(Nigeria)	DF	Chimezie Mbah	8	1	1	0	9	1
5	(Azerbaijan)	DF	Adil Naghiyev	9	0	0	0	9	0
6	(Azerbaijan)	MF	Vugar Mustafayev	2	0	1	0	3	0
7	(Curaçao)	FW	Rihairo Meulens	2	0	0	0	2	0
8	(Azerbaijan)	MF	Tarzin Jahangirov	2	0	0	0	2	0
9	(El Salvador)	FW	Nelson Bonilla	10	1	0	0	10	1
10	(Montenegro)	FW	Igor Ivanović	4	0	0	0	4	0
11	(Nigeria)	MF	Victor Igbekoyi	11	0	0	0	11	0
13	(Azerbaijan)	DF	Aleksandr Shemonayev	9	1	0	0	9	1
14	(Azerbaijan)	MF	Tellur Mutallimov	3	0	0	0	3	0
17	(Azerbaijan)	MF	Nijat Gurbanov	5	0	0	0	5	0
19	(Azerbaijan)	FW	Nurlan Novruzov	2	0	0	0	2	0
23	(Azerbaijan)	DF	Eltun Huseynov	1	0	0	0	1	0
27	(Azerbaijan)	MF	Rashad Abdullayev	1	0	0	0	1	0
28	(Azerbaijan)	MF	Tamkin Khalilzade	4	0	0	0	4	0
32	(Spain)	MF	Tato	5	0	0	0	5	0
37	(Serbia)	DF	Jovan Krneta	6	0	0	0	6	0
39	(Azerbaijan)	MF	Sadig Guliyev	2	1	0	0	2	1
60	(Azerbaijan)	MF	Elvin Mammadov	1	0	0	0	1	0
66	(Brazil)	FW	Eduardo	1	0	0	0	1	0
85	(Azerbaijan)	GK	Kamal Bayramov	3	0	0	0	3	0
90	(Azerbaijan)	MF	Vusal Isgandarli	1	0	0	0	1	0
96	(Azerbaijan)	FW	Elgün Nəbiyev	1	0	0	0	1	0
			TOTALS	95	4	2	0	97	4

== Notes ==
- Qarabağ have played their home games at the Tofiq Bahramov Stadium since 1993 due to the ongoing situation in Quzanlı.
