= 2016–17 Zira FK season =

Zira
2016-17 season
- President: Vugar Astanov
- Manager: Adil Shukurov (until 27 December); Aykhan Abbasov (from 27 December)
- Stadium: Zira Olympic Sport Complex Stadium
- Premier League: 4th
- Azerbaijan Cup: Quarterfinal vs Neftchi Baku
- Top goalscorer: League: César Meza Colli (4); All: César Meza Colli (4)

The Zira FK 2016–17 season is Zira's second Azerbaijan Premier League season, and third season in their history. It is their second season with Adil Shukurov as manager, during which they will participate in the Azerbaijan Cup as well as the League.

== Season events ==
On 27 December 2016, Adil Shukurov had his contract as manager terminated by mutual consent, with Aykhan Abbasov taking over as manager until the end of the season.

== Squad ==
As of 16 February 2017

Note: Flags indicate national team as defined under FIFA eligibility rules; some limited exceptions apply. Players may hold more than one non-FIFA nationality.

No.	Pos.	Nation	Player
1	GK	AZE	Anar Nazirov
5	DF	AZE	Adil Naghiyev
6	MF	AZE	Vugar Mustafayev (loan from Qarabağ)
7	MF	FRA	Ben Sangaré
8	MF	SRB	Milan Đurić
10	MF	AZE	Elvin Mammadov (captain)
11	MF	NGR	Victor Igbekoyi
12	GK	AZE	Shamo Hasanov
13	DF	AZE	Aleksandr Shemonayev
16	DF	NGR	Akeem Latifu
17	MF	AZE	Vusal Isgandarli
18	MF	AZE	Tural Jalilov
19	FW	AZE	Nurlan Novruzov
20	MF	PAR	César Meza Colli

No.	Pos.	Nation	Player
21	MF	AZE	Murad Sattarli
23	DF	SRB	Jovan Krneta
26	MF	GEO	Giorgi Gorozia
28	MF	AZE	Tamkin Khalilzade
38	MF	AZE	Ilkin Muradov
39	DF	AZE	Sadig Guliyev
43	FW	GHA	Richard Gadze (loan from Delhi Dynamos)
44	DF	POR	Miguel Lourenço (loan from Vitória de Setúbal)
64	MF	AZE	Ulvi Suleymanov
77	DF	AZE	Yamin Agakerimzade
85	GK	AZE	Kamal Bayramov
90	FW	AZE	Muxtar Əliyev
92	MF	AZE	Javid Taghiyev

== Transfers ==
=== Summer ===
In: Note: Flags indicate national team as defined under FIFA eligibility rules; some limited exceptions apply. Players may hold more than one non-FIFA nationality.

No.	Pos.	Nation	Player
6	MF	AZE	Vugar Mustafayev (loan from (Azerbaijan) Qarabağ)
7	MF	ALB	Gerhard Progni (from (Albania) Skënderbeu)
8	MF	SRB	Milan Đurić (from (Croatia) Istra)
18	MF	AZE	Tural Jalilov (from (Azerbaijan) Khazar Lankaran)
20	MF	PAR	César Meza Colli (from (Azerbaijan) Inter Baku)
21	MF	AZE	Murad Sattarli (from (Azerbaijan) AZAL)
44	DF	POR	Miguel Lourenço (loan from (Portugal) Vitória de Setúbal)
55	DF	AZE	Jamil Hajiyev (from (Azerbaijan) Sumgayit)
77	DF	AZE	Yamin Agakerimzade (from (Azerbaijan) Ravan Baku)
92	MF	AZE	Javid Taghiyev (from (Azerbaijan) Qarabağ)
99	FW	UKR	Yasyn Khamid (from (Azerbaijan) Ravan Baku)

Out: Note: Flags indicate national team as defined under FIFA eligibility rules; some limited exceptions apply. Players may hold more than one non-FIFA nationality.

No.	Pos.	Nation	Player
2	DF	NGR	Chimezie Mbah
8	MF	AZE	Tarzin Jahangirov (loan return to (Azerbaijan) Gabala)
9	FW	ESA	Nelson Bonilla (to (Portugal) Nacional)
10	FW	MNE	Igor Ivanović (to (Montenegro) Sutjeska)
14	MF	AZE	Tellur Mutallimov (loan return to (Azerbaijan) Gabala)
17	MF	AZE	Nijat Gurbanov (to (Azerbaijan) Kapaz)
27	MF	AZE	Rashad Abdullayev
32	MF	ESP	Tato (to (Spain) Escobedo)
33	MF	BRA	Diego Souza
39	DF	AZE	Sadig Guliyev (loan return to (Azerbaijan) Gabala)
77	DF	AZE	Ruslan Poladov (to (Azerbaijan) Shusha)

=== Winter ===
In: Note: Flags indicate national team as defined under FIFA eligibility rules; some limited exceptions apply. Players may hold more than one non-FIFA nationality.

No.	Pos.	Nation	Player
7	MF	FRA	Ben Sangaré (from (France) Sedan)
16	DF	NGR	Akeem Latifu (from (Turkey) Alanyaspor)
26	MF	GEO	Giorgi Gorozia (from (Norway) Stabæk)
39	DF	AZE	Sadig Guliyev (from (Azerbaijan) Gabala)
43	FW	GHA	Richard Gadze (loan from (India) Delhi Dynamos)

Out: Note: Flags indicate national team as defined under FIFA eligibility rules; some limited exceptions apply. Players may hold more than one non-FIFA nationality.

No.	Pos.	Nation	Player
7	MF	ALB	Gerhard Progni (to (Albania) Teuta Durrës)
55	DF	AZE	Jamil Hajiyev (to (Azerbaijan) Shamkir)
99	FW	UKR	Yasyn Khamid

== Friendlies ==
18 January 2017	Dordoi Bishkek (Kyrgyzstan)	1 – 2	(Azerbaijan) Zira	Antalya, Turkey
AZT (UTC+4)	(1st half)	Report	Đurić (2nd half); Mustafayev 75'

22 January 2017	Lokomotiv GO (Bulgaria)	1 – 0	(Azerbaijan) Zira	Antalya, Turkey
AZT (UTC+4)	(2nd half)	Report

== Competitions ==
=== Overview ===
Competition	First match	Last match	Starting round	Final position	Record							
Competition	First match	Last match	Starting round	Final position	Pld	W	D	L	GF	GA	GD	Win %
Premier League	6 August 2016	29 April 2017	Matchday 1	4th	28	10	9	9	29	26	+3	35.71
Azerbaijan Cup	3 December 2016	21 December 2016	Second Round	Quarterfinal	3	2	0	1	3	4	−1	66.67
Total					31	12	9	10	32	30	+2	38.71

Last updated: 29 April 2017
Source: Competitions

=== Premier League ===
==== Results summary ====
Overall								Home						Away					
Pld	W	D	L	GF	GA	GD	Pts	W	D	L	GF	GA	GD	W	D	L	GF	GA	GD
28	10	9	9	25	22	+3	39	7	4	3	15	8	+7	3	5	6	10	14	−4

Last updated: 29 April 2017.
Source: See Results

==== Results ====
6 August 2016 1	Zira	0 – 1	Sumgayit	Zirə
20:00 AZT (UTC+4)	Mustafayev (yellow card) 85'	Report	Javadov 75'; Yunanov (yellow card) 79'; Guluzade (yellow card) 86'	Stadium: Zira Olympic Sport Complex Stadium; Attendance: 1,000; Referee: Orkhan Məmmədov

14 August 2016 2	Neftchi Baku	0 – 1	Zira	Masazir
20:00 AZT (UTC+4)	Imamverdiyev (yellow card) 19'	Report	Khalilzade (yellow card) 14'; Đurić (yellow card) 40'; Mustafayev 43'	Stadium: Alinja Arena; Attendance: 750; Referee: Ramil Diniyev

19 August 2016 3	Zira	3 – 1	AZAL	Zirə
19:00 AZT (UTC+4)	Đurić (yellow card) 38'; Progni 39', 85'; E.Mammadov 45' (pen.)	Report	I.Alakbarov (yellow card) 45'; D.Janelidze 67'	Stadium: Zira Olympic Sport Complex Stadium; Attendance: 500; Referee: Fariz Yusifov

11 September 2016 4	Kapaz	2 – 0	Zira	Ganja
18:00 AZT (UTC+4)	Ebah 8'; Serginho (yellow card) 55'; S.Rahimov 78'	Report	Mustafayev (yellow card) 31'; Taghiyev (yellow card) 42'; Krneta (yellow card) 49'; Khalilzade (yellow card) 55'; K.Bayramov (yellow card) 57'	Stadium: Ganja City Stadium; Attendance: 10,000; Referee: Ramil Diniyev

19 September 2016 5	Qarabağ	2 – 0	Zira	Masazır
20:00 AZT (UTC+4)	Amirguliyev 20', 37'; Míchel (yellow card) 90+2'	Report	Mammadov (yellow card) 22'	Stadium: Alinja Arena; Attendance: 1,100; Referee: Rauf Jabbarov

25 September 2016 6	Zira	0 – 2	Gabala	Zirə
18:00 AZT (UTC+4)	Naghiyev (yellow card) 66'	Report	Stanković (yellow card) 3'; Weeks 19', 76'; A.Mammadov (yellow card) 30'; Franjić (yellow card) 65'	Stadium: Zira Olympic Sport Complex Stadium; Attendance: 800; Referee: Ravan Həmzəzadə

30 September 2016 7	Inter Baku	1 – 1	Zira	Baku
15:00 AZT (UTC+4)	Ramazanov 22'; E.Abdullayev (yellow card) 31'	Report	Igbekoyi (yellow card) 58' (goal) 90+2'; Khalilzade (yellow card) 63'; Mustafayev (yellow card) 74'; Krneta (yellow card) 77'	Stadium: Inter Arena; Attendance: 500; Referee: Fariz Yusifov

16 October 2016 8	Zira	2 – 0	Neftchi Baku	Zirə
18:30 AZT (UTC+4)	Meza (yellow card) 15'; Mustafayev (yellow card) 24'; Krneta 43' (pen.); Naghiyev 50' (yellow card) 58'	Report	Denílson (yellow card) 24'; R.Mammadov (yellow card) 39' (yellow-red card) 47'; K.Gurbanov (yellow card) 90+2'	Stadium: Zira Olympic Sport Complex Stadium; Attendance: 500; Referee: Rahim Həsənov

24 October 2016 9	AZAL	1 – 1	Zira	Baku
16:00 AZT (UTC+4)	G.Aliyev (yellow card) 40'; Coronado (yellow card) 46'; T.Hümbatov (yellow card) 54'; D.Janelidze 64'	Report	Meza 25' (pen.) (yellow card) 41'; Naghiyev (yellow card) 48'; Progni (yellow card) 67'; Lourenço (yellow card) 83'	Stadium: AZAL Arena; Attendance: 200; Referee: Rauf Jabbarov

30 October 2016 10	Zira	2 – 0	Kapaz	Zirə
14:00 AZT (UTC+4)	Mustafayev (yellow card) 40'; Khalilzade (yellow card) 45+1'; Taghiyev 69'; Mammadov 82' (pen.)	Report	T.Akhundov (yellow card) 21' (yellow-red card) 70'; Renan (yellow card) 29'; A.Karimov (yellow card) 66'; N.Gurbanov (yellow card) 75'; Serginho (yellow card) 88'	Stadium: Zira Olympic Sport Complex Stadium; Attendance: 500; Referee: Ingilab Məmmədov

6 November 2016 11	Zira	0 – 2	Qarabağ	Zirə
16:00 AZT (UTC+4)	Lourenço (yellow card) 73'; Đurić (yellow card) 77'; Mustafayev (yellow card) 90+1'	Report	Quintana 69'; Yunuszade 80'	Stadium: Zira Olympic Sport Complex Stadium; Attendance: 1,000; Referee: Ramil Diniyev

19 November 2016 12	Gabala	1 – 0	Zira	Qabala
15:00 AZT (UTC+4)	Sadiqov (yellow card) 31'; Ozobić 52'	Report	Taghiyev (yellow card) 30'; Meza (yellow card) 31'; Mustafayev (yellow card) 47'	Stadium: Gabala City Stadium; Attendance: 500; Referee: Omar Paşayev

28 November 2016 13	Zira	1 – 1	Inter Baku	Zirə
17:00 AZT (UTC+4)	Mustafayev (yellow card) 30'; Meza (yellow card) 63'; Mammadov (yellow card) 77'; Krneta 90+3' (yellow card) 90+3'	Report	Fardjad-Azad (yellow card) 19'; Denis (yellow card) 30'; Aghayev (yellow card) 30'; Abışov 48'; Scarlatache (yellow card) 62' (yellow-red card) 66'; Qirtimov (yellow card) 63'	Stadium: Zira Olympic Sport Complex Stadium; Attendance: 1,100; Referee: Orkhan Məmmədov

17 December 2016 14	Sumgayit	1 – 0	Zira	Sumqayit
16:00 AZT (UTC+4)	M.Abbasov 22'; Guluzade (yellow card) 82'; K.Abdullzade (yellow card) 86'	Report	Nazirov (yellow card) 70'; Naghiyev (yellow card) 71'; E.Nəbiyev (yellow card) 88'	Stadium: Kapital Bank Arena; Attendance: 350; Referee: Omar Paşayev

29 January 2017 15	Zira	2 – 1	AZAL	Zirə
15:00 AZT (UTC+4)	Meza 11', 29' (yellow card) 72'; Mustafayev (yellow card) 32'	Report	Abdullayev 50'; K.Mirzayev (yellow card) 52'	Stadium: Zira Olympic Sport Complex Stadium; Attendance: 800; Referee: Ravan Həmzəzadə

4 February 2017 16	Zira	1 – 0	Kapaz	Zirə
14:00 AZT (UTC+4)	Meza (red card) 28'; Latifu (yellow card) 34'; N.Novruzov 37' (yellow card) 43'; Krneta (yellow card) 80'; Nazirov (yellow card) 81'; Mammadov (yellow card) 86'	Report	V.Beybalayev (yellow card) 18'; Renan (yellow card) 23' (red card) 90+3'; Serginho (yellow card) 39'; T.Gurbatov (yellow card) 80'	Stadium: Zira Olympic Sport Complex Stadium; Attendance: 900; Referee: Elvin Əsgərov

8 February 2017 17	Qarabağ	2 – 0	Zira	Baku
17:30 AZT (UTC+4)	Ismayilov 13'; Ndlovu 47'; Ramazanov (yellow card) 51'	Report		Stadium: Azersun Arena; Attendance: 700; Referee: Rauf Jabbarov

12 February 2017 18	Zira	2 – 2	Gabala	Zirə
16:30 AZT (UTC+4)	Igbekoyi 53' (yellow card) 72'; Khalilzade (yellow card) 59'; Naghiyev (yellow card) 78'; Mustafayev (yellow card) 82'; Gadze 90+4'	Report	Subotić 37' (yellow card) 90+3'; Ramaldanov (yellow card) 57' (yellow-red card) 74'; Abbasov (yellow card) 66'; Ozobić 88'	Stadium: Zira Olympic Sport Complex Stadium; Attendance: 1,100; Referee: Aliyar Ağayev

18 February 2017 19	Inter Baku	1 – 1	Zira	Baku
15:30 AZT (UTC+4)	Scarlatache (yellow card) 35'; Khizanishvili (yellow card) 42'; Aliyev 47'; S.Alkhasov (yellow card) 48'; Qirtimov (yellow card) 68'	Report	Naghiyev (yellow card) 15'; Silva 40' (o.g.); Gadze (yellow card) 72'; Nazirov (red card) 74'	Stadium: Inter Arena; Attendance: 300; Referee: Orkhan Məmmədov

27 February 2017 20	Zira	1 – 0	Sumgayit	Zirə
18:00 AZT (UTC+4)	Gadze 35'; N.Novruzov (yellow card) 80'; Krneta (yellow card) 88'	Report		Stadium: Zira Olympic Sport Complex Stadium; Attendance: 1,300; Referee: Fariz Yusifov

5 March 2017 21	Neftchi Baku	1 – 2	Zira	Baku
18:00 AZT (UTC+4)	Lucas 60' (pen.); T.Jahangirov (yellow card) 90+3'	Report	Igbekoyi (yellow card) 49'; Navalovski 62'; Đurić 79'	Stadium: Bakcell Arena; Attendance: 500; Referee: Rahim Həsənov

13 March 2017 22	Kapaz	1 – 0	Zira	Ganja
15:00 AZT (UTC+4)	T.Akhundov (yellow card) 43'; Ebah 55'; Serginho (yellow card) 78'	Report	Khalilzade (yellow card) 20'; Đurić (yellow card) 23'	Stadium: Ganja City Stadium; Attendance: 6,200; Referee: Fariz Yusifov

19 March 2017 23	Zira	0 – 0	Qarabağ	Zirə
18:30 AZT (UTC+4)	Naghiyev (yellow card) 49'; Latifu (yellow card) 65' (yellow-red card) 66'; Mammadov (yellow card) 69'; Nazirov (yellow card) 89'; Igbekoyi (yellow card) 90'	Report	Diniyev (yellow card) 42'; Agolli (yellow card) 65'	Stadium: Zira Olympic Sport Complex Stadium; Attendance: 1,300; Referee: Ramil Diniyev

2 April 2017 24	Gabala	1 – 1	Zira	Qabala
18:30 AZT (UTC+4)	Zenjov 8'	Report	Meza 61'; Mustafayev (yellow card) 65'; Nazirov (yellow card) 90+1'	Stadium: Gabala City Stadium; Attendance: 800; Referee: Ingilab Məmmədov

10 April 2017 25	Zira	1 – 1	Inter Baku	Zirə
15:00 AZT (UTC+4)	Gadze 19'; Mammadov (yellow card) 66'	Report	Aliyev 12'; Qirtimov (yellow card) 54'; F.Bayramov (yellow card) 90+1'	Stadium: Zira Olympic Sport Complex Stadium; Attendance: 2,000; Referee: Ramil Diniyev

15 April 2017 26	Sumgayit	1 – 1	Zira	Sumqayit
16:30 AZT (UTC+4)	B.Hasanalizade (yellow card) 22'; A.Salahli (yellow card) 31'; Gystarov (yellow card) 60'; N.Mukhtarov (yellow card) 73'; M.Abbasov 83'; A.Mehdiyev (yellow card) 90+4'	Report	Naghiyev (yellow card) 67'; Đurić 90+4' (pen.) (yellow card) 90+4'	Stadium: Kapital Bank Arena; Attendance: 1,600; Referee: Aliyar Ağayev

23 April 2017 27	Zira	3 – 0	Neftchi Baku	Zirə
17:00 AZT (UTC+4)	Gadze (yellow card) 38'; Khalilzade 42'; Meza (yellow card) 44'; Mustafayev (yellow card) 59'; Latifu 63'	Report	Herrera 34' (yellow card) 34'; Abışov (yellow card) 39'; Alasgarov (yellow card) 45+1'; Folprecht (yellow card) 55'; Bajković (yellow card) 90'; Lucas 90+2'	Stadium: Zira Olympic Sport Complex Stadium; Attendance: 1,000; Referee: Fariz Yusifov
Note: On 25 April 2017, Zira were awarded a 3–0 victory over Neftchi Baku fielded 7 foreign players in this match.

29 April 2017 28	AZAL	0 – 3	Zira	Baku
16:00 AZT (UTC+4)		Report	Mammadov 34'; Đurić 54'; Khalilzade 83' (pen.)	Stadium: AZAL Arena; Attendance: 150; Referee: Aliyar Ağayev

==== League table ====
Pos	Team	Pld	W	D	L	GF	GA	GD	Pts	Qualification or relegation
2	Gabala	28	14	10	4	48	21	+27	52	Qualification for the Europa League second qualifying round
3	Inter Baku	28	11	10	7	39	33	+6	43	Qualification for the Europa League first qualifying round
4	Zira	28	10	9	9	29	26	+3	39	Qualification for the Europa League first qualifying round
5	Kapaz	28	9	9	10	24	27	−3	36	
6	Sumgayit	28	9	8	11	28	35	−7	35	

Source: PFL (in Azerbaijani), UEFA, Soccerway
Rules for classification: 1) Points; 2) Head-to-head points; 3) Head-to-head goal difference; 4) Head-to-head goals scored; 5) Head-to-head away goals scored (only if two teams); 6) Goal difference; 7) Goals scored.

=== Azerbaijan Cup ===
3 December 2016 Second Round	Turan-Tovuz	0 – 1	Zira	Tovuz
13:00 AZT (UTC+4)	A.Dashzarini (yellow card) 61'; A.Mukhtaroglu (yellow card) 82'; V.Asaliyev (yellow card) 83'	Report	N.Novruzov (yellow card) 61'; A.Shemonayev 80'	Stadium: Tovuz City Stadium; Attendance: 1,500; Referee: Ingilab Məmmədov

13 December 2016 Quarterfinal First Leg	Zira	0 – 3	Neftchi Baku	Zirə
17:00 AZT (UTC+4)		Report	Pessalli 44', 58', 63'	Stadium: Zira Olympic Sport Complex Stadium; Attendance: 400; Referee: Aliyar Ağayev

21 December 2016 Quarterfinal Second Leg	Neftchi Baku	1 – 2 (4 – 2 agg.)	Zira	Baku
17:00 AZT (UTC+4)	R.Mammadov 40'; E.Yagublu (yellow card) 59'; Jairo (yellow card) 61'	Report	Đurić 34' (yellow card) 59'; Krneta (yellow card) 35'; Naghiyev (yellow card) 39'; Meza (yellow card) 57'; N.Novruzov 85'	Stadium: Bakcell Arena; Attendance: 200; Referee: Ramil Diniyev

== Squad statistics ==
As of Match played 29 April 2017

=== Appearances and goals ===
No.	Pos	Nat	Player	Total		Premier League		Azerbaijan Cup	
No.	Pos	Nat	Player	Apps	Goals	Apps	Goals	Apps	Goals
1	GK	(Azerbaijan) AZE	Anar Nazirov	24	0	23	0	1	0
5	DF	(Azerbaijan) AZE	Adil Naghiyev	24	1	21+1	1	2	0
6	MF	(Azerbaijan) AZE	Vugar Mustafayev	28	1	21+4	1	3	0
7	MF	(France) FRA	Ben Sangaré	9	0	5+4	0	0	0
8	MF	(Serbia) SRB	Milan Đurić	29	4	24+2	3	3	1
9	FW	(Azerbaijan) AZE	Nurlan Novruzov	26	2	15+8	1	3	1
10	MF	(Azerbaijan) AZE	Elvin Mammadov	28	3	20+5	3	3	0
11	MF	(Nigeria) NGR	Victor Igbekoyi	23	2	17+6	2	0	0
13	DF	(Azerbaijan) AZE	Aleksandr Shemonayev	11	1	6+4	0	0+1	1
16	DF	(Nigeria) NGR	Akeem Latifu	11	0	11	0	0	0
17	MF	(Azerbaijan) AZE	Vusal Isgandarli	17	0	0+15	0	0+2	0
18	MF	(Azerbaijan) AZE	Tural Jalilov	12	0	5+4	0	2+1	0
20	MF	(Paraguay) PAR	César Meza Colli	22	4	18+2	4	1+1	0
21	MF	(Azerbaijan) AZE	Murad Sattarli	10	0	4+5	0	0+1	0
23	DF	(Serbia) SRB	Jovan Krneta	28	2	25	2	3	0
26	MF	(Georgia (country)) GEO	Giorgi Gorozia	5	0	0+5	0	0	0
28	MF	(Azerbaijan) AZE	Tamkin Khalilzade	30	2	27	2	3	0
38	MF	(Azerbaijan) AZE	Ilkin Muradov	1	0	0+1	0	0	0
39	DF	(Azerbaijan) AZE	Sadig Guliyev	12	0	12	0	0	0
43	FW	(Ghana) GHA	Richard Gadze	12	3	11+1	3	0	0
44	DF	(Portugal) POR	Miguel Lourenço	22	0	20	0	2	0
85	GK	(Azerbaijan) AZE	Kamal Bayramov	8	0	5+1	0	2	0
92	MF	(Azerbaijan) AZE	Javid Taghiyev	15	1	6+6	1	2+1	0
96	FW	(Azerbaijan) AZE	Elgun Nəbiyev	2	0	0+2	0	0	0
Players who left Zira during the season:
7	MF	(Albania) ALB	Gerhard Progni	17	2	12+2	2	3	0
55	DF	(Azerbaijan) AZE	Jəmil Hacıyev	1	0	0	0	0+1	0
99	FW	(Ukraine) UKR	Yasyn Khamid	3	0	0+3	0	0	0

=== Goal scorers ===
Place	Position	Nation	Number	Name	Premier League	Azerbaijan Cup	Total
1	MF	(Paraguay)	20	César Meza Colli	4	0	4
1	MF	(Serbia)	8	Milan Đurić	3	1	4
3	FW	(Ghana)	43	Richard Gadze	3	0	3
3	MF	(Azerbaijan)	10	Elvin Mammadov	3	0	3
5	MF	(Albania)	7	Gerhard Progni	2	0	2
5	DF	(Serbia)	23	Jovan Krneta	2	0	2
5	MF	(Nigeria)	11	Victor Igbekoyi	2	0	2
5	MF	(Azerbaijan)	28	Tamkin Khalilzade	2	0	2
5	FW	(Azerbaijan)	19	Nurlan Novruzov	1	1	2
5				Own goal	2	0	2
11	MF	(Azerbaijan)	6	Vugar Mustafayev	1	0	1
11	DF	(Azerbaijan)	5	Adil Naghiyev	1	0	1
11	MF	(Azerbaijan)	92	Javid Taghiyev	1	0	1
				Awarded	3	0	3
				TOTALS	29	3	32

=== Disciplinary record ===
Number	Nation	Position	Name	Premier League		Azerbaijan Cup		Total	
Number	Nation	Position	Name	Yellow card	Red card	Yellow card	Red card	Yellow card	Red card
1	(Azerbaijan)	GK	Anar Nazirov	4	1	0	0	4	1
5	(Azerbaijan)	DF	Adil Naghiyev	8	0	1	0	9	0
6	(Azerbaijan)	MF	Vugar Mustafayev	12	0	0	0	12	0
7	(Albania)	MF	Gerhard Progni	1	0	0	0	1	0
8	(Serbia)	MF	Milan Đurić	5	0	1	0	6	0
9	(Azerbaijan)	FW	Nurlan Novruzov	2	0	1	0	3	0
10	(Azerbaijan)	MF	Elvin Mammadov	5	0	0	0	5	0
11	(Nigeria)	MF	Victor Igbekoyi	4	0	0	0	4	0
16	(Nigeria)	DF	Akeem Latifu	3	1	0	0	3	1
20	(Paraguay)	MF	César Meza Colli	6	1	1	0	7	1
23	(Serbia)	DF	Jovan Krneta	5	0	1	0	6	0
28	(Azerbaijan)	MF	Tamkin Khalilzade	6	0	0	0	6	0
43	(Ghana)	FW	Richard Gadze	2	0	0	0	2	0
44	(Portugal)	DF	Miguel Lourenço	2	0	0	0	2	0
85	(Azerbaijan)	GK	Kamal Bayramov	1	0	0	0	1	0
92	(Azerbaijan)	DF	Javid Taghiyev	2	0	0	0	2	0
96	(Azerbaijan)	FW	Elgun Nəbiyev	1	0	0	0	1	0
			TOTALS	69	3	5	0	74	3
