= Eduardo (footballer, born 12 November 1986) =

Brazilian footballer

Personal information
- Full name: Eduardo da Conceição Maciel
- Date of birth: 12 November 1986 (age 40)
- Place of birth: Nova Iguaçu, Brazil
- Height: 1.71 m (5 ft 7 in)
- Position: Forward

Youth career
- 2005: Corinthians Alagoano

Senior career*
Years	Team	Apps	(Gls)
2005	Nagoya Grampus	2	(0)
2005	Corinthians Alagoano		
2006–2007	Botafogo		
2008	Vila Aurora		
2008–2009	Rot Weiss Ahlen		
2009–2010	Preussen TV Werl		
2010–2011	OKS 1945 Olsztyn	18	(4)
2012	Stal Kraśnik	12	(5)
2012–2013	Akhaa Ahli	18	(9)
2013–2014	Riffa		
2014–2015	AZAL	15	(3)
2015	Zira	2	(0)
2016	Gresik United	2	(0)
2018	Operário		
2018	Real Brasília		
2018	Olimpia Elbląg	5	(0)
2019	Al Nahda		
2020	Olímpia	0	(0)
- * Club domestic league appearances and goals as of 15:11, 9 March 2020 (UTC)

Eduardo da Conceição Maciel or simply Eduardo (born 12 November 1986), is a Brazilian professional footballer who plays as a forward.

== Career ==
Eduardo was born in Nova Iguaçu.

On 26 July 2014, Eduardo signed for Azerbaijan Premier League team AZAL on a two-year contract. In February 2015, during a reserve game for AZAL, suffered a season-ending injury that would require surgery.

In September 2015, Eduardo moved from AZAL to fellow Azerbaijan Premier League side Zira, again signing a two-year contract. During the winter break of the 2015–16 season, Eduardo left Zira.

In 2016, he played for Gresik United in the Indonesia Super League. He then had a short stint in the lower leagues of Brazil.

After only five appearances in 2018, his contract with Olimpia Elbląg was mutually terminated.

== Career statistics ==
As of match played 2 December 2015

Appearances and goals by club, season and competition
Club	Season	League			Cup		Continental		Total	
Club	Season	Division	Apps	Goals	Apps	Goals	Apps	Goals	Apps	Goals
OKS 1945 Olsztyn	2010–11	II liga	18	4	2	0	—		20	4
Stal Kraśnik	2011–12	III liga	12	5	—		—		12	5
Al Ahly Aley	2012–13	Lebanese Premier League	18	9			—		18	9
AZAL	2014–15	Azerbaijan Premier League	15	3	1	0	—		16	3
Zira	2015–16	Azerbaijan Premier League	2	0	1	0	—		3	0
Career total			65	21	4	0	—		69	21

== Honours ==
Individual

- Lebanese Premier League Best Goal: 2012–13
