= Ben Sangaré =

French footballer (born 1990)

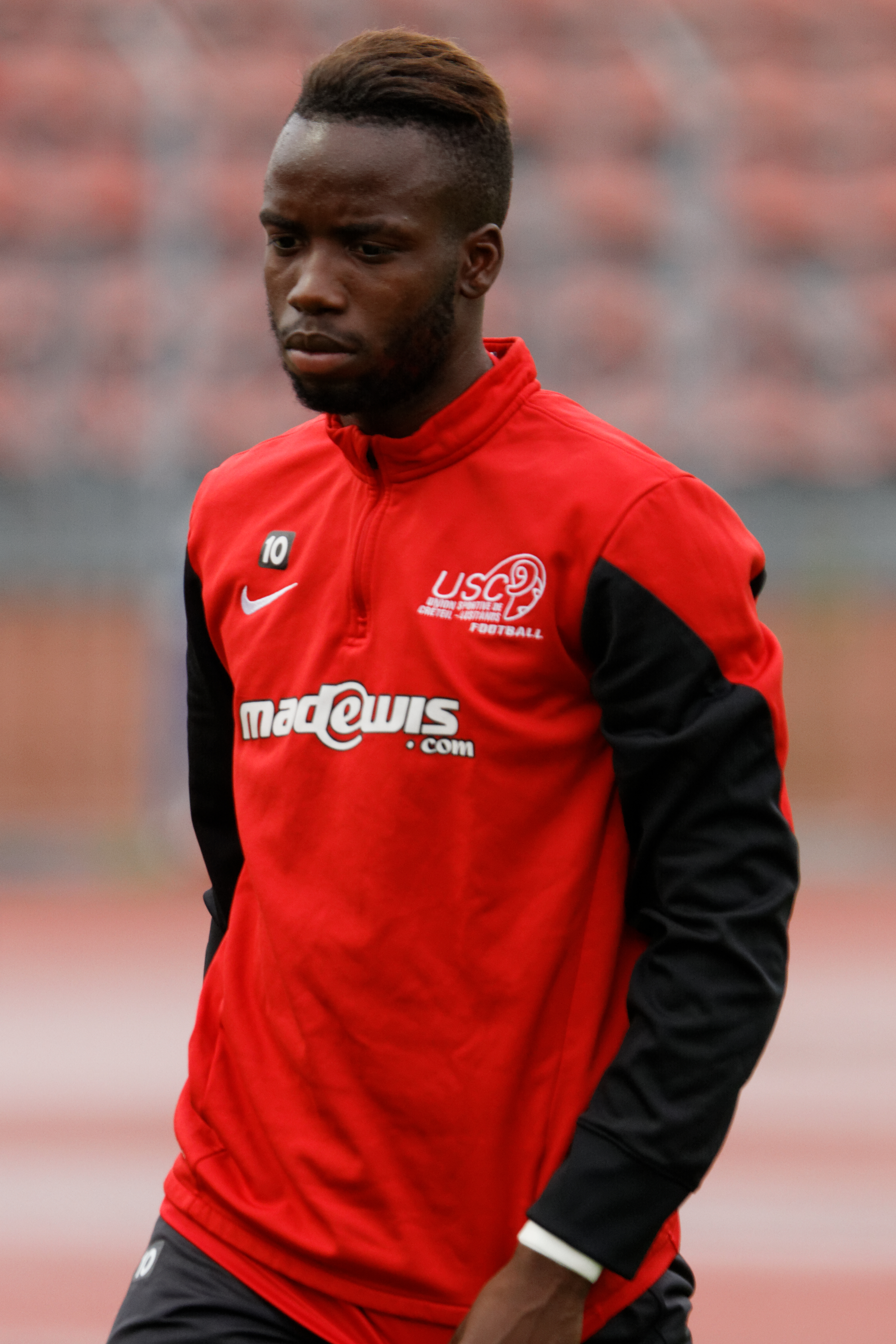
- Sangaré in 2014

Personal information
- Full name: Ben Amadou Sangaré
- Date of birth: 12 November 1990 (age 35)
- Place of birth: Bondy, France
- Height: 1.75 m (5 ft 9 in)
- Position: Attacking midfielder

Senior career*
Years	Team	Apps	(Gls)
2008–2009	Nancy B	8	(0)
2009–2010	Saint-Brieuc	?	(?)
2010–2011	SC Freiburg II	16	(1)
2011–2012	US Ivry	23	(8)
2012–2014	Arles-Avignon	29	(2)
2014–2016	Créteil	41	(4)
2016	Sedan	8	(0)
2017	Zira	9	(0)
2018–2020	Sainte-Geneviève Sports	13	(3)
2021–2022	US Ivry	1	(0)
- * Club domestic league appearances and goals as of 1 July 2022

Ben Amadou Sangaré (born 12 November 1990) is a French professional footballer who most recently played as an attacking midfielder for Championnat National 3 club US Ivry.

== Career ==
On 30 January 2017, Sangaré signed a six-month contract with Azerbaijan Premier League club Zira FK, leaving the club at the end of May 2017.

In January 2018 he went on trial to Finnish Veikkausliiga side IFK Mariehamn, where he played as a substitute in a single 2017–18 Finnish Cup game against Klubi 04.

== Career statistics ==
As of match played 29 April 2017

Appearances and goals by club, season and competition
Club	Season	League			National cup		League cup		Continental		Other		Total	
Club	Season	Division	Apps	Goals	Apps	Goals	Apps	Goals	Apps	Goals	Apps	Goals	Apps	Goals
Arles-Avignon	2012–13	Ligue 2	22	2	0	0	4	0	–		–		26	2
Arles-Avignon	2013–14	Ligue 2	7	0	1	0	1	0	–		–		9	0
Arles-Avignon	Total		29	2	1	0	5	0	-	-	-	-	35	2
US Créteil	2013–14	Ligue 2	13	3	0	0	0	0	–		–		13	3
US Créteil	2014–15	Ligue 2	15	1	1	1	2	0	–		–		18	2
US Créteil	2015–16	Ligue 2	13	0	1	0	1	0	–		–		15	0
US Créteil	Total		41	4	2	1	3	0	-	-	-	-	46	5
CS Sedan	2016–17	Championnat National	8	0	0	0	–		–		–		8	0
Zira	2016–17	Azerbaijan Premier League	9	0	0	0	–		–		–		9	0
Career total			87	6	3	1	8	0	-	-	-	-	98	7
