= Miguel Lourenço (footballer, born 1992) =

Portuguese footballer

Personal information
- Full name: Miguel Martelo Lourenço
- Date of birth: 27 May 1992 (age 34)
- Place of birth: Quinta do Conde, Portugal
- Height: 1.86 m (6 ft 1 in)
- Position: Centre-back

Youth career
- 2002–2004: AD Quinta do Conde
- 2004–2005: Fernão Ferro
- 2005–2006: Escolinha António Pica
- 2006–2011: Vitória Setúbal

Senior career*
| Years | Team | Apps | (Gls) |
| 2010–2017 | Vitória Setúbal | 41 | (1) |
| 2011–2012 | → Casa Pia (loan) | 24 | (0) |
| 2013–2014 | → Santa Clara (loan) | 20 | (1) |
| 2016–2017 | → Zira (loan) | 20 | (0) |
| 2018 | União Madeira | 16 | (2) |
| 2018–2021 | Mafra | 38 | (1) |
| 2021–2022 | Vitória Setúbal | 10 | (0) |
| 2023 | Kvik Halden | | |
| 2023–2024 | Pêro Pinheiro | 13 | (0) |
| 2024–2025 | Amora | 20 | (1) |
| 2025–2026 | Lusitano Évora | 1 | (0) |

International career
| 2007 | Portugal U16 | 3 | (0) |
| 2008 | Portugal U17 | 3 | (0) |
| 2009 | Portugal U18 | 2 | (0) |
| 2012–2013 | Portugal U21 | 5 | (0) |
- * Club domestic league appearances and goals as of 13:11, 11 November 2025 (UTC)

Miguel Martelo Lourenço (born 27 May 1992) is a Portuguese professional footballer who plays as a centre-back.

== Club career ==
Born in Quinta do Conde, Sesimbra, Setúbal District, Lourenço joined Vitória de Setúbal's youth system in 2006, aged 14. He made his senior debut with amateurs Casa Pia AC, on loan.

Lourenço first appeared in the Primeira Liga on 26 August 2012, playing the second half of a 0–5 home loss against S.L. Benfica as the hosts were already trailing 3–0 and with one player less. His first goal arrived on 23 February of the following year, when he scored the game's only through a header to defeat S.C. Beira-Mar also at the Estádio do Bonfim.

For 2013–14, Lourenço was loaned to Segunda Liga team C.D. Santa Clara. He subsequently returned, going on to total 24 league matches over the following two top-flight seasons.

On 28 June 2016, still owned by Vitória, Lourenço joined Zira FK on loan, leaving at the end of the campaign. Released by the former club one year later, he returned to his country and remained a free agent until late December 2017, when he signed a one-and-a-half-year contract with C.F. União of the second division.

Lourenço ventured abroad again in March 2023, moving to Norwegian third-tier Kvik Halden FK. He went back to Portugal on 15 September, signing for Liga 3 club C.A. Pêro Pinheiro.

== International career ==
Lourenço won 13 caps for Portugal across all youth levels. His first for the under-21 team arrived on 15 October 2012, when he played the first 45 minutes in a 1–0 friendly home loss to Ukraine.
