= Jovan Krneta =

Serbian footballer

Personal information
- Full name: Jovan Krneta
- Date of birth: 4 May 1992 (age 34)
- Place of birth: Belgrade, FR Yugoslavia
- Height: 1.87 m (6 ft 1 1/2 in)
- Positions: Centre-back; right-back

Youth career
- Partizan

Senior career*
Years	Team	Apps	(Gls)
2010–2011	Partizan	0	(0)
2010	→ Teleoptik (loan)	10	(0)
2011–2014	Red Star Belgrade	22	(0)
2011	→ Sopot (loan)	25	(1)
2014	Radnički Kragujevac	9	(0)
2015	Chornomorets Odesa	11	(0)
2015–2018	Zira	74	(6)
2018–2019	Levadiakos	5	(0)
2020	Zira	2	(0)
2020–2021	Inđija	23	(0)
2022	Rudar Pljevlja	14	(0)
2022-2023	Smederevo		
2023	Hajduk Kula 1912		
2024	Omladinac Novi Banovci		

International career^{‡}
2011	Serbia U19	2	(0)
- * Club domestic league appearances and goals as of 24 July 2021 ‡ National team caps and goals as of 22 June 2015

Jovan Krneta (Serbian Cyrillic: Јован Крнета; born 4 May 1992) is a Serbian footballer who plays as a defender.

== Career ==
Jovan began his career with Partizan youth squad. Few times he was even included in their first team, but never managed to make a debut for them. In January 2011, after his contract with Partizan expired, he signed for their arch rivals Red Star Belgrade. However, he was loaned to the Sopot where he spent almost a year. In January 2012 he was promoted to Red Star's first squad, and on 14 March 2012 he made his first team debut in a match against Smederevo.

In July 2015, Krneta signed a one-year contract with Azerbaijan Premier League side Zira FK.

== Career statistics ==
As of match played 10 March 2018

Appearances and goals by club, season and competition
Club	Season	League			National Cup		Continental		Other		Total	
Club	Season	Division	Apps	Goals	Apps	Goals	Apps	Goals	Apps	Goals	Apps	Goals
Red Star Belgrade	2011–12	Serbian SuperLiga	8	0	0	0	-		-		8	0
Red Star Belgrade	2012–13	Serbian SuperLiga	1	0	0	0	2	0	-		3	0
Red Star Belgrade	2013–14	Serbian SuperLiga	12	0	2	1	3	0	-		17	1
Red Star Belgrade	Total		21	0	2	1	5	0	-	-	28	1
Radnički 1923	2014–15	Serbian SuperLiga	9	0	1	0	–		–		10	0
Chornomorets Odesa	2014–15	Ukrainian Premier League	11	0	1	0	–		–		12	0
Zira	2015–16	Azerbaijan Premier League	30	3	0	0	–		–		30	3
Zira	2016–17	Azerbaijan Premier League	25	2	3	0	–		–		28	2
Zira	2017–18	Azerbaijan Premier League	19	1	2	0	4	0	–		25	1
Zira	Total		74	6	5	0	4	0	-	-	83	6
Career total			115	6	9	1	7	0	0	0	133	7

== Honours ==
Red Star

- Serbian SuperLiga: 2013–14
- Serbian Cup: 2011–12
