= Rihairo Meulens =

Curaçaoan footballer

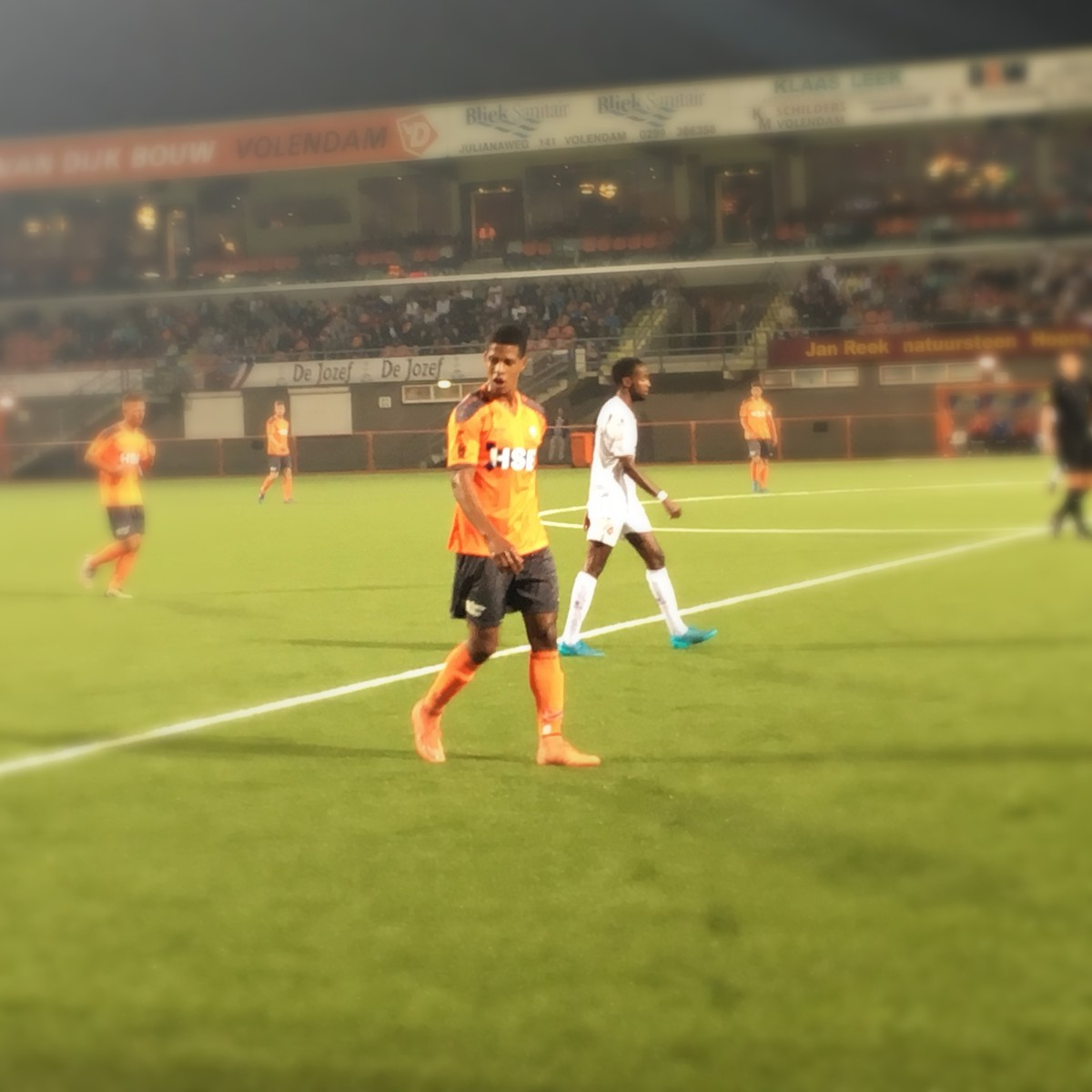

Personal information
- Full name: Rihairo Meulens
- Date of birth: 3 June 1988 (age 38)
- Place of birth: Apeldoorn, Netherlands
- Height: 1.85 m (6 ft 1 in)
- Position: Striker

Team information
- Current team: ASV Dronten

Senior career*
Years	Team	Apps	(Gls)
2006–2008	Vitesse	9	(0)
2007–2008	→ AGOVV (loan)	26	(6)
2008–2009	Dordrecht	34	(6)
2009–2011	Roda JC	22	(0)
2011–2013	Almere City	52	(6)
2013–2015	Dordrecht	42	(7)
2015	Rapid București	14	(2)
2015–2016	Zira	11	(0)
2016–2017	Volendam	17	(4)
2018–2020	VVOG	45	(15)
2020–	ASV Dronten		

International career^{‡}
2011–2015	Curaçao	10	(3)
- * Club domestic league appearances and goals as of 30 January 2021 ‡ National team caps and goals as of 9 March 2017 (UTC)

Rihairo Meulens (born 3 June 1988) is a Curaçaoan footballer who plays for ASV Dronten in the lower-tier Tweede Klasse.

== Career ==
=== Club ===
Meulens is a striker who was born in Apeldoorn and made his debut in professional football, being part of the Vitesse Arnhem squad in the 2006–07 season. He spent the 2007–08 season on loan with AGOVV.

At the beginning of the 2011-12 season he was on trial at De Graafschap, but eventually joined the Eerste Divisie side Almere City FC on 11 July 2011.

In July 2015, Meulens signed a two-year contract with Azerbaijan Premier League side Zira FK. On 5 January 2016, Meulens cancelled his contract with Zira by mutual consent.

After leaving Zira, Meulens went on trial with Kazakhstan Premier League side Irtysh Pavlodar, scoring in their 3-2 victory over Dila Gori on 3 February 2016.

At the beginning of July 2016, Meulens went on trial at Eerste Divisie side FC Volendam, signing a one-year contract with the club on 2 August 2016.

=== International ===
Meulens made his international debut on 7 September 2011 in a 2014 FIFA World Cup qualifying match against Haiti. He scored his first international goal during the qualification process, in a 5–2 loss against Antigua and Barbuda.

== Career statistics ==
=== Club ===
As of match played 2 December 2015

Club	Season	League			National Cup		Continental		Other		Total	
Club	Season	Division	Apps	Goals	Apps	Goals	Apps	Goals	Apps	Goals	Apps	Goals
Vitesse Arnhem	2006–07	Eredivisie	9	0			-		-		9	0
AGOVV Apeldoorn (loan)	2007–08	Eerste Divisie	26	6			-		-		26	6
Dordrecht	2008–09	Eerste Divisie	34	6	1	0	-		4	0	39	6
Roda JC	2009–10	Eredivisie	4	0	0	0	-		-		4	0
Roda JC	2010–11	Eredivisie	20	1	2	1	-		-		22	2
Roda JC	Total		24	1	2	1	-	-	-	-	26	2
Almere City	2011–12	Eerste Divisie	29	3	2	0	-		-		31	3
Almere City	2012–13	Eerste Divisie	24	3	0	0	-		-		24	3
Almere City	Total		53	6	2	0	-	-	-	-	55	6
Dordrecht	2013–14	Eerste Divisie	29	6	1	0	-		3	0	33	6
Dordrecht	2014–15	Eredivisie	13	1	0	0	-		-		13	1
Dordrecht	Total		42	7	1	0	-	-	3	0	46	7
Rapid București	2014–15	Liga I	14	2	0	0	-		-		14	2
Zira	2015–16	Azerbaijan Premier League	11	0	1	0	-		-		12	0
Career total			213	28	7	1	0	0	7	0	227	28

=== International ===
Curaçao
Year	Apps	Goals
2011	1	1
2014	5	2
2015	4	0
Total	10	3

Statistics accurate as of match played 4 September 2015

=== International goals ===
#	Date	Venue	Opponent	Score	Result	Competition
1.	3 September 2011	Sir Vivian Richards Stadium, North Sound, Antigua and Barbuda	Antigua and Barbuda	0–1	5–2	2014 FIFA World Cup qualification
2.	11 November 2014	Catherine Hall Sports Complex, Montego Bay, Jamaica	Trinidad and Tobago	1–0	2–3	2014 Caribbean Cup
3.	15 November 2014	Catherine Hall Sports Complex, Montego Bay, Jamaica	French Guiana	4–1	4–1	2014 Caribbean Cup
