= Tato (footballer, born 1992) =

Spanish footballer

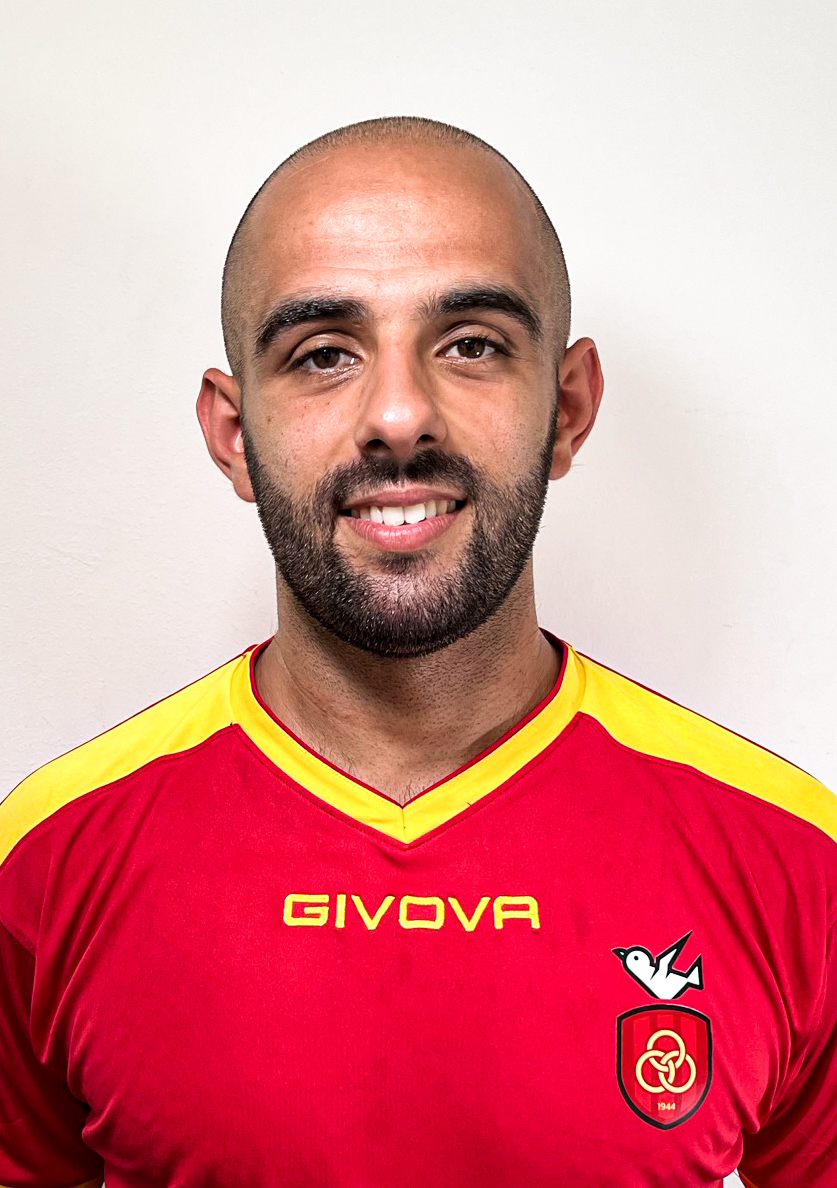
- Tato with Toma Maglie in 2023

Personal information
- Full name: Luis Alberto Díez Ocerín
- Date of birth: 9 July 1992 (age 34)
- Place of birth: Santander, Spain
- Height: 1.78 m (5 ft 10 in)
- Position: Midfielder

Team information
- Current team: Víkingur Ó.

Youth career
- Racing Santander

Senior career*
Years	Team	Apps	(Gls)
2009–2013	Racing B	87	(14)
2011	Racing Santander	2	(0)
2013–2014	Sestao	30	(1)
2014–2015	Sporting B	29	(3)
2015–2016	Zira	32	(5)
2016	Escobedo	2	(3)
2016–2017	Orihuela	9	(1)
2017–2018	CD Azuqueca		
2018	Mons Calpe	4	(0)
2018–2019	Chieti		
2020–2021	Martina		
2021	Real Potosí	2	(0)
2021–2022	Sulmona		
2022	Terracina		
2022	Teramo		
2023	Bruno's Magpies	9	(0)
2023	Toma Maglie		
2024–	Víkingur Ó.	32	(8)
- * Club domestic league appearances and goals as of 25 July 2025

Luis Alberto Díez Ocerín (born 9 July 1992), commonly known as Tato, is a Spanish footballer who plays for Víkingur Ólafsvik as a midfielder.

== Football career ==
Born in Santander, Cantabria, Tato was a product of hometown club Racing de Santander's youth ranks. He made his senior debuts with the reserves in the 2009–10 campaign, aged only 17, in Segunda División B.

Tato made his first-team – and La Liga – debut on 6 March 2011, playing the last two minutes in a 1–3 home defeat against Real Madrid. He spent the vast majority of his spell registered with the B-side, however.

On 26 June 2013, Tato signed with Sestao River Club in Segunda División B. After featuring regularly for the Basques he moved to another reserve team, Sporting de Gijón B in the same level.

On 23 May 2016, Zira FK announced that Tato had left the club after one season in the Azerbaijan Premier League. On 23 September he returned to his home country, signing for UM Escobedo.
