= Tellur Mutallimov =

Azerbaijani footballer (born 1995)

- Tellur Mutallimov in 2026.

Personal information
- Full name: Tellur Uzdan oglu Mutallimov
- Date of birth: 8 April 1995 (age 31)
- Place of birth: Khachmaz, Azerbaijan
- Height: 1.77 m (5 ft 10 in)
- Position: Winger

Team information
- Current team: Sabah
- Number: 17

Youth career
- Gabala

Senior career*
Years	Team	Apps	(Gls)
2015–2017	Gabala	24	(5)
2015–2016	→ Zira (loan)	15	(0)
2018–2020	Zira	48	(4)
2020–2022	Sumgayit	49	(4)
2022–	Sabah	87	(4)

International career
2015	Azerbaijan U21	1	(0)
2017–2021	Azerbaijan	14	(0)
Medal record
Men's football
Representing Azerbaijan
Islamic Solidarity Games
Winner	2017 Azerbaijan
- * Club domestic league appearances and goals as of 15 November 2026

Tellur Mutallimov (Azerbaijani: Tellur Uzdan oğlu Mütəllimov; born 8 April 1995) is an Azerbaijani professional footballer who plays as a midfielder for Azerbaijan Premier League club Sabah.

== Club career ==
=== Gabala ===
Mutallimov made his European debut in 2016 against Georgian sode Samtredia in the first qualification round of the 2016-17 UEFA Europa League which ended in a 5–1 win for Gabala.

=== Zira ===
On 30 December 2017, Mutallimov signed a two-year contract with Zira.

On 10 June 2019, Mutallimov signed a one-year contract extension.

=== Sumgayit ===
On 17 July 2020, Mutallimov signed a one-year contract with Sumgayit.

== International career ==
Mutallimov made his Azerbaijan debut in a friendly match against Qatar on 9 March 2017.

== Career statistics ==
=== Club ===
As of match played 20 May 2018

Appearances and goals by club, season and competition
Club	Season	League			Azerbaijan Cup		Continental		Total	
Club	Season	Division	Apps	Goals	Apps	Goals	Apps	Goals	Apps	Goals
Gabala	2015–16	Azerbaijan Premier League	0	0	0	0	0	0	0	0
Gabala	2016–17	Azerbaijan Premier League	17	4	3	0	2 (Note: Appearances in UEFA Europa League)	0	22	4
Gabala	2017–18	Azerbaijan Premier League	7	1	1	0	0	0	8	1
Gabala	Total		24	5	4	0	2	0	30	5
Zira (loan)	2015–16	Azerbaijan Premier League	15	0	3	0	—		18	0
Zira	2017–18	Azerbaijan Premier League	11	1	0	0	0	0	11	1
Career total			50	6	7	0	2	0	59	6

=== International ===
Appearances and goals by national team and year
National team	Year	Apps	Goals
Azerbaijan
Azerbaijan	2017	1	0
Azerbaijan	2020	3	0
Azerbaijan	2021	3	0
Total		7	0

== Honours ==
Sabah

- Azerbaijan Premier League: 2025–26
- Azerbaijan Cup: 2024–25, 2025–26

Azerbaijan U23

- Islamic Solidarity Games: 2017
