= Chimezie Mbah =

Nigerian footballer (born 1992)

Personal information
- Full name: Jimmy Chimezie Mbah
- Date of birth: 10 November 1992 (age 34)
- Place of birth: Nigeria
- Height: 1.76 m (5 ft 9 in)
- Position: Defender

Youth career
- Warri Wolves

Senior career*
Years	Team	Apps	(Gls)
2010–2013	Warri Wolves		
2013	Hakoah Amidar Ramat Gan	13	(0)
2013	Waasland-Beveren	0	(0)
2014	Hapoel Bnei Lod	11	(0)
2014–2015	Hapoel Petah Tikva	20	(0)
2015–2016	Zira	19	(0)
2016	Hapoel Nazareth Illit	2	(0)

International career^{‡}
- Nigeria U20
- * Club domestic league appearances and goals as of 16 November 2017 ‡ National team caps and goals as of 25 August 2015

Jimmy Chimezie Mbah (born 10 November 1992), is a Nigerian footballer who last played for Israeli club Hapoel Nazareth Illit as a defender.

== Career ==
=== Club ===
Mbah began his career with Warri Wolves, progressing from their youth team to the senior team at 18. In January 2013, Mbah moved to Hakoah Amidar Ramat Gan of the Israeli Liga Leumit, before six-months later moving to Waasland-Beveren in Belgium on a two-year contract. In January 2014, Mbah returned to Israel, signing with Hapoel Bnei Lod, before joining Hapoel Petah Tikva in September of the same year on a six-month contract. In January 2015 Hapoel Petah Tikva exercised their option to extend Mbah's contract till the end of the 2014–15 season. In July 2015, Mbah signed a one-year contract with newly promoted Azerbaijan Premier League side Zira FK. On 23 May 2016, Zira announced that Mbah had left the club after one-season with them.

=== International ===
Mbah participated in the 2011 FIFA U-20 World Cup for Nigeria.

== Career statistics ==
=== Club ===
As of match played 16 December 2016

Club	Season	League			National Cup		League Cup		Continental		Total	
Club	Season	Division	Apps	Goals	Apps	Goals	Apps	Goals	Apps	Goals	Apps	Goals
Hakoah Amidar Ramat Gan	2012–13	Liga Leumit	13	0	0	0	0	0	–		13	0
Waasland-Beveren	2013–14	Jupiler Pro League	0	0	0	0	0	0	–		0	0
Hapoel Bnei Lod	2013–14	Liga Leumit	11	0	1	0	0	0	–		12	0
Hapoel Petah Tikva	2014–15	Israeli Premier League	20	0	2	0	0	0	–		22	0
Zira	2015–16	Azerbaijan Premier League	19	0	3	0	–		–		22	0
Hapoel Nazareth Illit	2016–17	Liga Leumit	2	0	0	0	0	0	–		2	0
Career total			65	0	6	0	0	0	0	0	71	0
