= Adil Shukurov =

Azerbaijani footballer and manager (born 1977)

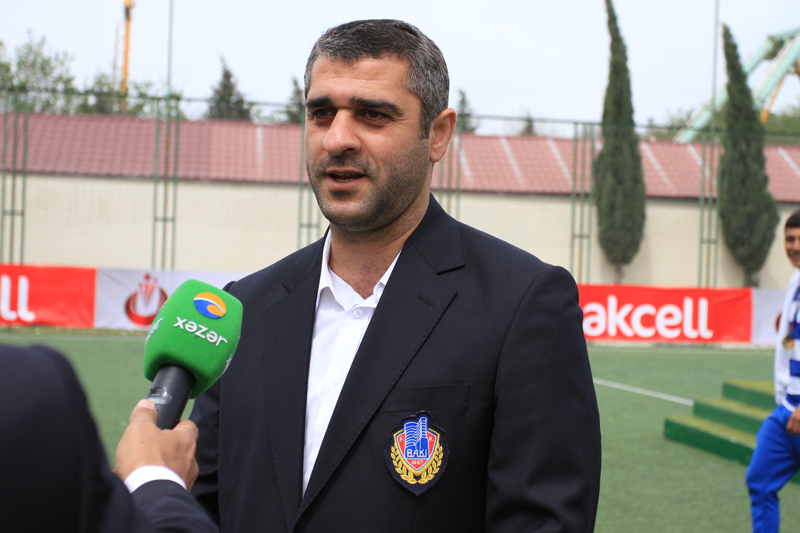

Personal information
- Full name: Adil Teymur oglu Shukurov
- Date of birth: 16 August 1977 (age 49)
- Place of birth: Lachin, Azerbaijan SSR
- Position: Defender

Team information
- Current team: Sumgayit (director of academy)

Senior career*
Years	Team	Apps	(Gls)
1992–1993	AZAL		
1994–1995	Zabrat Baku		
1995–1997	Farid Baku		
1997–1998	Shafa Baku		
1998–1999	Bakili		
1999–2001	Kapaz		
2001–2002	Shafa Baku		
2002–2003	Bakili		
2003–2005	Shafa Baku		
2005–2006	Tractor Sazi		
2006–2007	Karvan		
2007–2008	Ganclarbirliyi		

International career
1990	Azerbaijan U21		
1998	Azerbaijan	1	(0)

Managerial career
- 2008–2009: Azerbaijan U15 (assistant)
- 2009–2010: Azerbaijan U17 (assistant)
- 2010–2011: Azerbaijan U17
- 2015–2016: Zira
- 2019–2020: Shuvelan
- 2023–2024: Kapaz
- 2025: Kapaz
- 2025–2026: Sabail
- * Club domestic league appearances and goals

Adil Shukurov (Azerbaijani: Adil Şükürov, born 16 August 1977) is an Azerbaijani football manager and former football defender, currently the director of academy Sumgayit FK.

== Managerial career ==
After his football career ended, he became the assistant coach of the Azerbaijan U15 national team.

In 2010, he was appointed as the head coach of Azerbaijan U17 to replace Nicolai Adam.

Shukurov worked as a coach with FC Baku youth teams from 2011 until 2015.

On 7 April 2015, Shukurov signed with Azerbaijan Premier League club Zira FK. On 27 December 2016, Shukurov had his contract as manager of Zira terminated by mutual consent.

On August 29, 2024, Shukurov left the Kapaz club, where he was the head coach, by his own decision.

On 10 June 2025, Adil Shukurov was reappointed as head coach of Kapaz on a two-year contract. Under his management, the team lost all five matches played. Mounting dissatisfaction among fans over this poor run of results culminated in an incident on 20 September 2025 during the Gabala – Kapaz match, where Shukurov verbally insulted a supporter. Two days later, on 22 September 2025, Kapaz announced that his contract had been terminated by mutual consent.

On 29 November 2025, he was appointed head coach of Sabail FK.
