= 2015–16 Azerbaijan Premier League =

Azerbaijan Premier League
- Season: 2015–16
- Champions: Qarabağ
- Relegated: Khazar Lankaran
- Champions League: Qarabağ
- Europa League: Gabala; Kapaz; Neftchi Baku
- Matches: 180
- Goals: 390 (2.17 per match)
- Top goalscorer: Dani Quintana (15)
- Biggest home win: Gabala 6–0 Khazar Lankaran (4 October 2015)
- Biggest away win: Ravan Baku 0–4 Zira (10 April 2016); Ravan Baku 0–4 Inter Baku (7 May 2016)
- Highest scoring: Gabala 6–0 Khazar Lankaran (4 October 2015); Qarabağ 5–1 Ravan Baku (30 March 2016)
- Longest winning run: Qarabağ (10)
- Longest unbeaten run: Qarabağ (14)
- Longest winless run: Ravan Baku (11)
- Longest losing run: Khazar Lankaran (22)
- Highest attendance: 20,400; Kapaz 1–2 Qarabağ (14 February 2016)
- All statistics correct as of 29 February 2016.

The 2015–16 Azerbaijan Premier League was the 24th season of Azerbaijan Premier League, the top tier of Azerbaijani professional league for association football clubs, since its establishment in 1992. Qarabağ were the defending champions, having won the 2014–15 season.

== Teams ==
Zira FK entered the Premier League one year after their formation, and Kapaz PFK returned to the top level after two years of absence. Zira and Kapaz came fifth and ninth, respectively, in the 2014–15 First Division. They replaced Araz-Naxçıvan PFK, which withdrew from the league in November 2014, and Baku FC, which was relegated at the end of the previous season.

On 21 June 2015 the Professional Football League of Azerbaijan announced that Simurq PIK had refused to play in the 2015–16 Premier League due to ongoing financial problems. They were replaced by Ravan Baku FK, which came third in the 2014–15 First Division after they were relegated from the Premier League one season earlier.

Location of teams in 2015–16 Azerbaijan Premier League.
Team in italics are from a zone of the Nagorno-Karabakh conflict and are playing home game in Baku.

=== Stadia and locations ===
Note: Table lists in alphabetical order.

Team	Location	Venue	Capacity
AZAL	Baku	AZAL Stadium	5,000
Gabala	Gabala	Gabala City Stadium	3,500
Inter Baku	Baku	Inter Arena	8,500
Khazar Lankaran	Lankaran	Lankaran City Stadium	15,000
Neftchi Baku	Baku	Bakcell Arena	11,000
Qarabağ	Ağdam	Karabakh Stadium	5,800
Ravan	Baku	Bayil Stadium	3,000
Sumgayit	Sumqayit	Kapital Bank Arena	1,500
Zira	Baku	Zira Olympic Sport Complex Stadium	1,500
Kapaz	Ganja	Ganja City Stadium	27,000

=== Personnel and kits ===
Note: Flags indicate national team as has been defined under FIFA eligibility rules. Players may hold more than one non-FIFA nationality.

Team	Manager	Team captain	Kit manufacturer	Shirt sponsor
AZAL	(Azerbaijan) Tarlan Ahmadov	(Azerbaijan) Seymur Asadov	Umbro	Silk Way
Gabala	(Ukraine) Roman Hryhorchuk	(Azerbaijan) Javid Huseynov	Joma	QafqaZ Hotels
Inter Baku	(Georgia (country)) Zaur Svanadze	(Georgia (country)) Giorgi Lomaia	Joma	IBA
Khazar Lankaran	(Azerbaijan) Elbrus Mammadov	(Azerbaijan) Tural Jalilov	Puma	Palmali
Neftçi Baku	(Azerbaijan) Vali Gasimov	(Azerbaijan) Araz Abdullayev	adidas	SOCAR
Qarabağ	(Azerbaijan) Gurban Gurbanov	(Azerbaijan) Rashad Sadygov	adidas	Azersun
Ravan	(Azerbaijan) Bahman Hasanov	(Azerbaijan) Ramazan Abbasov	Umbro	Nissan
Sumgayit	(Azerbaijan) Samir Abbasov	(Azerbaijan) Vurğun Hüseynov	Umbro	Azerkimya
Zira	(Azerbaijan) Adil Shukurov	(Azerbaijan) Rashad Abdullayev	Kappa	Santral
Kapaz	(Azerbaijan) Shahin Diniyev	(Azerbaijan) Tural Akhundov	adidas	Gəncə 4000

=== Managerial changes ===
Team	Outgoing manager	Manner of departure	Date of vacancy	Position in table	Incoming manager	Date of appointment
Sumgayit	(Azerbaijan) Agil Mammadov	Resigned	8 October 2015	8th	(Azerbaijan) Samir Abbasov	8 October 2015
Ravan Baku	(Azerbaijan) Emin Quliyev	Resigned	17 October 2015	10th	(Azerbaijan) Bahman Hasanov	17 October 2015
Neftchi Baku	(Azerbaijan) Samir Aliyev	Resigned	15 November 2015	6th	(Azerbaijan) Asgar Abdullayev	15 November 2015
Khazar Lankaran	(Azerbaijan) Yunis Hüseynov	Resigned	13 January 2016	9th	(Azerbaijan) Elbrus Mammadov	18 January 2016
Neftchi Baku	(Azerbaijan) Asgar Abdullayev	Resigned	5 March 2016	7th	(Azerbaijan) Vali Gasimov (caretaker)	6 March 2016

== League table ==
Pos	Team	Pld	W	D	L	GF	GA	GD	Pts	Qualification or relegation
1	Qarabağ (C)	36	26	6	4	66	21	+45	84	Qualification for the Champions League second qualifying round (Note: Qarabağ qualified for the Europa League first qualifying round by winning the 2015–16 Azerbaijan Cup. However, since they already qualified for European competition based on their league position, the spot awarded to the cup winners was passed down the league.)
2	Zira (Note: Zira would have qualified for the Europa League first qualifying round, but failed to obtain a UEFA licence as the club has existed professionally for less than three season.)	36	17	11	8	42	31	+11	62	
3	Gabala	36	16	11	9	44	28	+16	59 (Note: Gabala ahead of Inter Baku on head-to-head record: Inter Baku–Gabala 2–1, Gabala–Inter Baku 1–1, Inter Baku–Gabala 0–1, Gabala–Inter Baku 0–0.)	Qualification for the Europa League first qualifying round
4	Inter Baku (Note: On 31 March 2016, the Adjudicatory Chamber of the UEFA Club Financial Control Body (CFCB) announced that Inter Baku will be excluded from participating in the next UEFA club competition for which they would otherwise qualify in the next three seasons (i.e. the 2016/17, 2017/18 and 2018/19 seasons).)	36	16	11	9	39	28	+11	59	
5	Kapaz	36	15	11	10	48	40	+8	56	Qualification for the Europa League first qualifying round
6	Neftçi Baku	36	13	10	13	41	41	0	49	Qualification for the Europa League first qualifying round
7	AZAL	36	13	7	16	26	38	−12	46	
8	Sumgayit	36	9	12	15	41	49	−8	39	
9	Ravan Baku	36	5	9	22	27	63	−36	18	
10	Khazar Lankaran (R)	36	3	6	27	16	51	−35	15	Relegation to the Azerbaijan First Division

Source: PFL, UEFA, Soccerway
Rules for classification: 1) Points; 2) Head-to-head points; 3) Head-to-head goal difference; 4) Head-to-head goals scored; 5) Head-to-head away goals scored (only if two teams); 6) Goal difference; 7) Goals scored.
(C) Champions; (R) Relegated

== Results ==
=== Games 1–18 ===
Home \ Away	AZL	INT	KHA	RAV	NEF	QAR	GAB	SUM	ZIR	KAP
AZAL		0–1	1–0	1–0	2–1	0–2	0–2	2–0	1–0	1–1
Inter Baku	2–0		2–0	2–0	1–0	0–2	2–1	2–3	0–0	1–0
Khazar Lankaran	3–1	2–0		1–1	0–2	0–1	0–1	1–2	0–1	0–1
Ravan Baku	0–0	0–2	0–1		1–3	1–2	0–3	0–0	1–0	0–2
Neftçi Baku	0–1	1–1	1–1	2–3		1–0	0–1	2–1	1–1	0–0
Qarabağ	2–0	1–0	1–0	1–0	1–1		1–1	2–2	4–1	3–0
Gabala	0–0	1–1	6–0	1–1	0–1	2–2		1–0	0–0	1–0
Sumgayit	1–1	1–1	1–1	3–3	1–2	1–0	2–2		0–0	2–2
Zira	1–0	0–0	1–0	2–1	2–0	0–0	1–0	3–2		2–2
Kapaz	1–0	0–0	1–0	0–0	1–1	2–3	3–0	3–1	1–1	

Source: Azerbaijan Premier League
Legend: Blue = home team win; Yellow = draw; Red = away team win.

=== Games 19–36 ===
Home \ Away	AZL	INT	KHA	RAV	NEF	QAR	GAB	SUM	ZIR	KAP
AZAL		0–0	1–0	1–0	1–1	1–0	2–1	1–0	1–1	3–0
Inter Baku	1–0		2–1	3–1	0–1	1–1	0–1	2–2	1–0	1–0
Khazar Lankaran	0–1	0–1		0–0	0–1	1–2	0–1	1–2	0–2	0–3
Ravan Baku	1–0	0–4	2–2		1–0	2–1	0–1	1–2	0–4	1–3
Neftçi Baku	3–1	4–2	1–0	1–1		1–2	1–2	1–0	0–0	2–3
Qarabağ	3–0	2–0	3–0	5–1	2–0		2–0	1–0	2–0	4–0
Gabala	2–0	0–0	0–0	2–0	2–2	1–2		1–0	1–2	1–2
Sumgayit	2–0	0–1	2–1	3–1	2–1	0–2	1–1		0–2	2–3
Zira	4–2	2–1	1–0	2–1	3–0	0–2	0–3	1–0		2–2
Kapaz	2–0	1–1	2–0	3–2	1–2	1–2	0–1	0–0	2–0	

Source: Azerbaijan Premier League
Legend: Blue = home team win; Yellow = draw; Red = away team win.

== Season statistics ==
=== Scoring ===
- First goal of the season: Victor Igbekoi for Zira against AZAL (9 August 2015)
- Fastest goal of the season: 1st minute,
  - Dodô for Gabala against Khazar Lankaran (4 October 2015)
- Latest goal of the season: 95th minute,
  - Facundo Pereyra for Gabala against Ravan Baku (30 November 2015)
  - Tural Akhundov for Kapaz against Sumgayit (7 December 2015)
- Largest winning margin: 6 goals
  - Gabala 6-0 Khazar Lankaran (4 October 2015)
- Highest scoring game: 6 goals
  - Gabala 6-0 Khazar Lankaran (4 October 2015)
  - Sumgayit 3-3 Ravan (19 December 2015)
  - Qarabağ 5-1 Ravan (30 March 2016)
- Most goals scored in a match by a single team: 6 goals
  - Gabala 6-0 Khazar Lankaran (4 October 2015)

=== Top scorers ===
As of match played 20 May 2016

Rank	Player	Club	Goals
1	(Spain) Dani Quintana	Qarabağ	15
2	(El Salvador) Nelson Bonilla	Zirə	14
3	(Azerbaijan) Ruslan Qurbanov	Neftçi	13
4	(Azerbaijan) Amil Yunanov	Sumqayıt	12
5	(Ukraine) Oleksiy Gai	Qəbələ	10
6	(Brazil) Richard	Qarabağ	9
6	(Cameroon) Julien Ebah	Kəpəz	9
8	(Sweden) Samuel Armenteros	Qarabağ	7
8	(Bosnia and Herzegovina) Ermin Zec	Qəbələ	7
8	(Ukraine) Oleksiy Antonov	Qəbələ	7
8	(Georgia (country)) Nugzar Kvirtia	AZAL	7
8	(Azerbaijan) Mahir Madatov	Qarabağ	7

=== Hat-tricks ===
Player	For	Against	Result	Date	REF.
(El Salvador) Nelson Bonilla	Zirə	Ravan Baku	4-0	10 April 2016	

=== Discipline ===
==== Player ====
- Most yellow cards: 10
  - Ailton - Neftchi Baku
  - Éric Ramos - Neftchi Baku
  - Emin Mehdiyev - Sumgayit
- Most red cards: 2
  - Adrian Scarlatache - Khazar Lankaran
  - Elshan Rzazadä - Khazar Lankaran
  - Jairo - Neftchi Baku
  - Ailton - Neftchi Baku
  - Emin Mehdiyev - Sumgayit

==== Club ====
- Most yellow cards: 81
  - Neftchi Baku
- Most red cards: 7
  - Neftchi Baku
