= 1993 Azerbaijan Cup =

Tournament details
- Country: Azerbaijan
- Teams: 24

Final positions
- Champions: Karabakh
- Runners-up: İnşaatçı Sabirabad

Tournament statistics
- Matches played: 77
- Goals scored: 248 (3.22 per match)

The Azerbaijan Cup 1993 was the second season of the annual cup competition in Azerbaijan. The competition started on 17 March 1993 and end with the final on 28 May 1993.

== First round ==
Team 1	Agg.	Team 2	1st leg	2nd leg
Azeri Baku	1-3	Daşqın Zaqatala	1-0	3–3
Nicat Maştağa	4–3	Kapaz	2–2	2–1
Çıraqqala Siyəzən	6–1	Mil Beyləqan	5–0	1–1
Khazar Lankaran	10-2	Ərgünəş Füzuli	5-1	5-1
Khazar Sumgayit	5-0	Ümid	3-0	2-0
Karabakh	5–1	Gənclik Şəki	3–1	2–0
Çeşmə Lənkəran	1–3	Azneftyağ Baku	1–2	0–1
Kur	3-3(4–3p.)	Khazri Buzovna	3-0	0–3

== Second round ==
Team 1	Agg.	Team 2	1st leg	2nd leg
Daşqın Zaqatala	2-7	Pambiqci Neftcala	1-1	1–6
Avtomobilçi Yevlax	w/o	Pambygchi Barda	2-0	w/o
Nicat Maştağa	2–3	İnşaatçı Baku	1–1	1–2
Plastik Salyan	1–0	Bahar Baku	1–0	0–0
İnşaatçı Sabirabad	9–2	Çıraqqala Siyəzən	7–0	2–2
Şəfəq Samux	1-4	Shirvan Ağdaş	1-0	0-4
Boz Qurd Samukh	0-2	Khazar Lankaran	0-1	0-1
Kürmük Qakh	15-2	Göyazan Qazax	10-0	5-2
Turan Tovuz-2	0–5	Khazar Sumgayit	0–4	0–1
Neftchi Baku	6-1	MOIK Baku	6-0	0–1
Karabakh	8–1	Shamkir	5-0	3–1
Polad Sumqayıt	0–3	Avei Agstafa	0–0	0–3
Azneftyağ Baku	4–5	Şirvan Şamaxı	1–3	3–2
Turan Tovuz	8-4	Gənclik Hacıqabul	5-3	3-1
FK Masallı	4–5	Kur	3–0	1–5
Nefteqaz	3-2	Energetik Əli-Bayramlı	2-0	1-2

== Round of 16 ==
Team 1	Agg.	Team 2	1st leg	2nd leg
Avtomobilçi Yevlax	4-3	Pambiqci Neftcala	1-0	3–3
Plastik Salyan	2–5	İnşaatçı Baku	2–3	0–2
İnşaatçı Sabirabad	10–4	Shirvan Ağdaş	7–2	3–2
Kürmük Qakh	w/o	Khazar Lankaran	1-1	w/o
Neftchi Baku	0-0(4–3p.)	Khazar Sumgayit	0-0	0–0
Avei Agstafa	1–6	Karabakh	1–0	0–6
Şirvan Şamaxı	0–8	Turan Tovuz	0–5	0–3
Kur	4-5	Nefteqaz	3-0	1–5

== Quarterfinals ==
Team 1	Agg.	Team 2	1st leg	2nd leg
Avtomobilçi Yevlax	1-5	İnşaatçı Baku	1-2	0–3
Khazar Lankaran	3–6	İnşaatçı Sabirabad	2–3	1–3
Karabakh	2–1	Neftchi Baku	2–1	0–0
Turan Tovuz	2-1	Nefteqaz	2-1	0–0

== Semifinals ==
Team 1	Agg.	Team 2	1st leg	2nd leg
İnşaatçı Baku	2–4	İnşaatçı Sabirabad	1–0	1–4
Turan Tovuz	1–3	Karabakh	1–2	0–1

== Final ==
28 May 1993
AZST (UTC+5)

Karabakh	1–0 (a.e.t.)	İnşaatçı Sabirabad
Mushfig Huseynov 97'

Tofiq Bahramov Stadium, Baku
Attendance: 10,500
