= 1993–94 Azerbaijan Cup =

1993-94 Azerbaijan Cup
Tournament details
- Country: Azerbaijan
- Teams: 45

Final positions
- Champions: Kapaz
- Runners-up: Khazar Lankaran

The Azerbaijan Cup 1993-94 was the third season of the annual cup competition in Azerbaijan with the final taking place on 28 May 1994.

== First round ==
Team 1	Agg.	Team 2	1st leg	2nd leg
MOİK-Göyazan	w/o	Şəfa Naftalan	w/o	w/o
Metallurg Sumgayit	6–3	Kapaz	4–1	2-2
Çeşmə Lankaran	6–3	Azeri Baku-2	2–1	4-2
Qum adası	w/o	Mil Beylagan	w/o	w/o
Turan Tovuz-2	1-2	Plastik Salyan	1-2	w/o
İnşaatçı Sabirabad	1–4	Məşəl Baku	2–0	1–4
Zabrat	3-0	Şərabçı Khachmaz	2-0	1-0
Pambiqci Neftcala	5-3	Sərhədçi Astara	4-2	1–1
Kur-Nur	10-3	Bibiheybət	6-0	4–3
MOIK Baku	10-1	Goychay	7-0	3-1
Sirvan Şamaxı	4-1	Avei Agstafa	2-0	2-1
Pambiqci Zardab	1-4	AZAL Baku	1-1	0-3
Sahil Baku	2-4	Azneftyağ Baku	2-4	0–0

== Second round ==
Team 1	Agg.	Team 2	1st leg	2nd leg
Şirvan Ağdaş	4-5	Turan Tovuz	4-5	w/o
MOİK-Göyazan	4-3	Xəzri-Eltac Buzovna	4-0	0-3
Nicat Maştağa	6-1	Metallurg Sumgayit	6-0	0-1
Çeşmə Lankaran	1-4	Azeri Baku	1-0	0–4
Kapaz	8-2	Qum adası	4-0	4-2
Plastik Salyan	3-9	Kur-Nur	3-0	0–9
İnşaatçı Baku	1-0	Məşəl Baku	1-0	0-0
Çıraqqala Siyəzən	w/o	Ümid	w/o	w/o
Göytəpə	w/o	Neftchi Baku	w/o	w/o
FK Masallı	3–1	Zabrat	3–0	0–1
Pambiqci Neftcala	3-10	Qarabağ	1-3	2–7
Nefteqaz	4-2	Energetik Əli-Bayramlı	2-0	2-2
MOIK Baku	1-2	Pambygchi Barda	0-0	1–2
Şirvan Şamaxı	w/o	Khazar Lankaran	w/o	w/o
AZAL Baku	0–7	Khazar Sumgayit	0–0	0–7
Avtomobilçi Yevlax	1-6	Azneftyağ Baku	1-1	0-5

== Round of 16 ==
Team 1	Agg.	Team 2	1st leg	2nd leg
Turan Tovuz	0-0(1–3p.)	OİK-Göyazan	0-0	0–0
Azeri Baku	1–3	Nicat Maştağa	1–2	0–1
Kapaz	3–1	Kur-Nur	1–0	2–1
İnşaatçı Baku	4–3	Ümid	2–1	2–2
Neftchi Baku	5-2	FK Masallı	4-0	1–2
Nefteqaz	2–3	Qarabağ	2–1	0–2
Pambygchi Barda	3–3(a)	Khazar Lankaran	3–1	0–2
Khazar Sumgayit	3-1	Azneftyağ Baku	3-1	0–0

== Quarterfinals ==
Team 1	Agg.	Team 2	1st leg	2nd leg
Nicat Maştağa	2-3	OİK-Göyazan	2-0	0–3
Kapaz	3–1	İnşaatçı Baku	1–0	2–1
Qarabağ	w/o	Neftchi Baku	w/o	w/o
Khazar Sumgayit	2–3	Khazar Lankaran	2–0	0–3

== Semifinals ==
Team 1	Agg.	Team 2	1st leg	2nd leg
Kapaz	w/o	OİK-Göyazan	w/o	w/o
Qarabağ	w/o	Khazar Lankaran	0–3	w/o

== Final ==
28 May 1994
AZST (UTC+5)

Kapaz	2–0	Khazar Lankaran
D.Tanriverdiev 31'; F.Parvarov 62'

Tofiq Bahramov Stadium, Baku
Attendance: 3,500
