= Tarlan Ahmadov =

Azerbaijani footballer

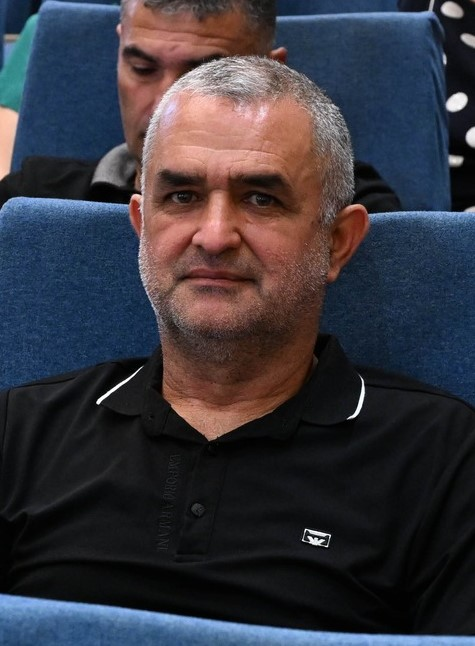
- Ahmadov in 2025

Personal information
- Full name: Tarlan Musa oglu Ahmadov
- Date of birth: 17 November 1971 (age 54)
- Place of birth: Baku, Azerbaijan SSR, Soviet Union
- Height: 1.84 m (6 ft 0 in)
- Position: Defender

Senior career*
Years	Team	Apps	(Gls)
1989	Termist Baku	8	(1)
1989–1991	Neftchi Baku	69	(0)
1992–1993	Turan Tovuz	6	(0)
1993	Terek Grozny	14	(0)
1993–1997	Qarabağ	91	(28)
1997	Anzhi Makhachkala	5	(0)
1997–2000	Neftchi Baku	16	(2)
2000	Fakel Voronezh	7	(1)
2000–2001	Neftchi Baku	18	(4)
2001–2002	Shafa Baku	17	(2)
2002–2003	Esteghlal		
2003–2004	Volyn Lutsk	22	(0)
2004	Qarabağ	11	(0)
2004–2006	Karvan	38	(0)
2006–2009	Olimpik Baku	72	(1)
Total		394	(39)

International career
1990	USSR U-21		
1992–2005	Azerbaijan	75	(0)

Managerial career
- 2009–2010: Khazar Lankaran (assistant)
- 2011–2013: Neftchi Baku (assistant)
- 2014–2017: AZAL PFK
- 2017–2018: Neftchi Baku
- 2018–2020: Keşla
- 2022–2023: Kapaz
- * Club domestic league appearances and goals

Tarlan Musa oglu Ahmadov (Azerbaijani: Tərlan Musa oğlu Əhmədov, born 17 November 1971) is an Azerbaijani football manager and former defender.

Ahmadov had a lengthy club career with spells in Azerbaijan, Russia, Ukraine and Iran. He won 75 caps in 12 years for the Azerbaijani national team, having previously represented the Soviet Union at under-21 level.

== Club career ==
Ahmadov started his career at Termist Baku before moving to Neftchi Baku in 1989 and then Turan Tovuz in 1992. His first venture outside Azerbaijan was for Terek Grozny during the 1993 season, appearing 14 times. Ahmadov returned to Azerbaijan for the start of the 1993–94 season, signing for Qarabağ. Ahmadov played for Qarabağ for four seasons before heading back to Russia with Anzhi Makhachkala, though it was a short stay, playing five times before signing with Neftchi Baku in 1997. After three seasons, which included a short spell at Shafa Baku, Ahmadov yet again headed to Russia, this time signing for Fakel Voronezh in the Russian Top Division. After only seven games Ahmadov returned to Neftchi Baku, before moving to Shafa Baku again, having fallen out of favor at Neftchi. With the 2002–03 Azerbaijan Championship not being held, Ahmadov headed to Iran to sign for Esteghlal. After Esteghlal, Ahmadov signed for Volyn Lutsk in the Ukrainian Premier League. Ahmadov returned to Azerbaijan halfway through the 2003–04 with Qarabağ, before moving to Karvan for two seasons and then Olimpik Baku for the final three seasons of his career. Ahmadov retired from football at the end of the 2008–09 season.

== Career statistics ==
=== Club ===
Season	Club	League	League		Cup		Continental		Total	
Season	Club	League	App	Goals	App	Goals	App	Goals	App	Goals
1989	Termist Baku		8	1			-		8	1
1989	Neftchi Baku	Soviet First League	12	0			-		12	0
1990	Neftchi Baku	Soviet First League	25	0			-		25	0
1991	Neftchi Baku	Soviet First League	32	0			-		32	0
1992	Turan Tovuz	Azerbaijan Premier League	6	0			-		6	0
1993	FC Terek Grozny	Russian First League "West"	14	0			-		14	0
1993–94	Qarabağ	Azerbaijan Premier League	26	6			-			0
1994–95	Qarabağ	Azerbaijan Premier League	18	5			-			0
1995–96	Qarabağ	Azerbaijan Premier League	21	9			-		21	9
1996–97	Qarabağ	Azerbaijan Premier League	26	8			-		26	8
1997	Anzhi Makhachkala	Russian First League	5	0			-		5	0
1997–98	Neftchi Baku	Azerbaijan Premier League					-			0
1998–99	Neftchi Baku	Azerbaijan Premier League	17	2			-		17	2
1998–99	Shafa Baku	Azerbaijan Premier League	8	0			-		8	0
1999–2000	Neftchi Baku	Azerbaijan Premier League	7	0			-		7	0
2000	Fakel Voronezh	Russian Top Division	7	0			-		7	0
2001–02	Neftchi Baku	Azerbaijan Premier League	4	0			-		4	0
2001–02	Shafa Baku	Azerbaijan Premier League	17	2			-		17	2
2002–03	Esteghlal	Persian Gulf Cup					-			
2003–04	Volyn Lutsk	Ukrainian Premier League	22	0			-		22	0
2003–04	Qarabağ	Azerbaijan Premier League	11	0			-		11	0
2004–05	Karvan	Azerbaijan Premier League	27	0			-		27	0
2005–06	Karvan	Azerbaijan Premier League	11	0			0	0	11	0
2006–07	Olimpik Baku	Azerbaijan Premier League	23	1			-		23	1
2007–08	Olimpik Baku	Azerbaijan Premier League	26	0			-		26	0
2008–09	Olimpik Baku	Azerbaijan Premier League	23	0			2	0	25	0
Total			44	2			2	0	46	2

=== International ===
National team	Year	Apps	Goals
Azerbaijan	1992	3	0
Azerbaijan	1993	3	0
Azerbaijan	1994	5	0
Azerbaijan	1995	5	0
Azerbaijan	1996	8	0
Azerbaijan	1997	5	0
Azerbaijan	1998	3	0
Azerbaijan	1999	8	0
Azerbaijan	2000	9	0
Azerbaijan	2001	7	0
Azerbaijan	2002	10	0
Azerbaijan	2003	7	0
Azerbaijan	2004	1	0
Azerbaijan	2005	1	0
Total		75	0

== Honours ==
=== Club ===
Qarabağ

- Azerbaijan Cup: 1993
- Azerbaijan Premier League Runners-up (1): 1993–94

Karvan

- Azerbaijan Premier League Runners-up (1): 2005–06

Olimpik Baku

- Azerbaijan Premier League Runners-up (1): 2007–08

=== National ===
Soviet Union U-21

- UEFA European Under-21 Football Championship (1): 1990

=== Individual ===
- Azerbaijani Footballer of the Year (1): 1999
