= Kanan Karimov =

Azerbaijani footballer and manager (born 1976)

Kenan Kerimov
Personal information
- Date of birth: 5 August 1976 (age 50)
- Place of birth: Yevlakh, Azerbaijan SSR
- Height: 1.75 m (5 ft 9 in)
- Position: Striker

Senior career*
| Years | Team | Apps | (Gls) |
| 1993–1997 | Qarabağ | 46 | (6) |
| 1997–1998 | MOIK Baku | 4 | (1) |
| 1998–2001 | Masalli | 34 | (8) |
| 2001–2002 | Kapaz | 25 | (14) |
| 2003–2004 | Shamkir | 16 | (19) |
| 2004–2005 | Turan Tovuz | 24 | (15) |
| 2005–2006 | Karvan | 23 | (4) |
| 2006–2008 | Qarabağ | 42 | (6) |
| 2008–2010 | Gabala | 46 | (11) |
| 2010–2011 | Kapaz | 1 | (0) |
| 2011–2012 | Karvan | 18 | (7) |

International career
| 2002–2007 | Azerbaijan | 14 | (1) |

Managerial career
- 2013–2014: Karvan
- 2021–2025: Karvan
- * Club domestic league appearances and goals

Kanan Karimov (Azerbaijani: Kənan Kərimov; born 5 August 1976) is an Azerbaijani football manager and former player. He is vice-president of Karvan.

Karimov was appointed a manager of the newly reformed Karvan in August 2013.

== Career statistics ==
As of 2 August 2013

| Club performance | | | League | | Cup | | Continental | | Total | |
| Season | Club | League | Apps | Goals | Apps | Goals | Apps | Goals | Apps | Goals |
| Azerbaijan | | | League | | Azerbaijan Cup | | Europe | | Total | |
|---|---|---|---|---|---|---|---|---|---|---|
| 1993 | Qarabağ | Azerbaijan Premier League | 12 | 3 | | | - | | 12 | 3 |
| 1993–94 | Qarabağ | Azerbaijan Premier League | 7 | 1 | | | - | | 7 | 1 |
| 1994–95 | Qarabağ | Azerbaijan Premier League | 10 | 1 | | | - | | 10 | 1 |
| 1995–96 | Qarabağ | Azerbaijan Premier League | 15 | 1 | | | - | | 15 | 1 |
| 1996–97 | Qarabağ | Azerbaijan Premier League | 2 | 0 | | | | | 2 | 0 |
| 1997–98 | MOIK Baku | Azerbaijan Premier League | 4 | 1 | | | - | | 4 | 1 |
| 1998–99 | FK Masalli | Azerbaijan Premier League | 6 | 1 | | | - | | 6 | 1 |
| 1999–2000 | FK Masalli | Azerbaijan Premier League | 19 | 6 | | | - | | 19 | 6 |
| 2000–01 | FK Masalli | Azerbaijan Premier League | 9 | 1 | | | - | | 9 | 1 |
| 2001–02 | Kapaz | Azerbaijan Premier League | 25 | 14 | | | - | | 25 | 14 |
| 2002-03 | | Azerbaijan Premier League | no league championship was held. | | | | | | - | - |
| 2003–04 | Shamkir | Azerbaijan Premier League | 16 | 19 | | | - | | 16 | 19 |
| 2004–05 | Turan Tovuz | Azerbaijan Premier League | 24 | 15 | | | - | | 24 | 15 |
| 2005–06 | Karvan | Azerbaijan Premier League | 23 | 4 | | | 2 | 0 | 25 | 4 |
| 2006–07 | Qarabağ | Azerbaijan Premier League | 22 | 4 | | | 2 | 0 | 24 | 4 |
| 2007–08 | Qarabağ | Azerbaijan Premier League | 20 | 2 | | | - | | 20 | 2 |
| 2008–09 | Gabala | Azerbaijan Premier League | 23 | 6 | | 6 | - | | 23 | 12 |
| 2009–10 | Gabala | Azerbaijan Premier League | 23 | 5 | | 1 | - | | 23 | 6 |
| 2010–11 | Kapaz | Azerbaijan Premier League | 1 | 0 | 0 | 0 | - | | 1 | 0 |
| 2011-12 | Karvan | Azerbaijan First Division | 18 | 7 | 0 | 0 | - | | 18 | 7 |
| Career total | | | 279 | 90 | | | 4 | 0 | 283 | 90 |

== Managerial statistics ==
As of 10 December 2013

| Team | Nat | Managerial Tenure | P | W | D | L | Win % |
|---|---|---|---|---|---|---|---|
| Karvan | Azerbaijan | 21 August 2013 – | 13 | 5 | 2 | 6 | 38.46 |
