= Ramiz Mammadov =

Azerbaijani football player (born 1968)

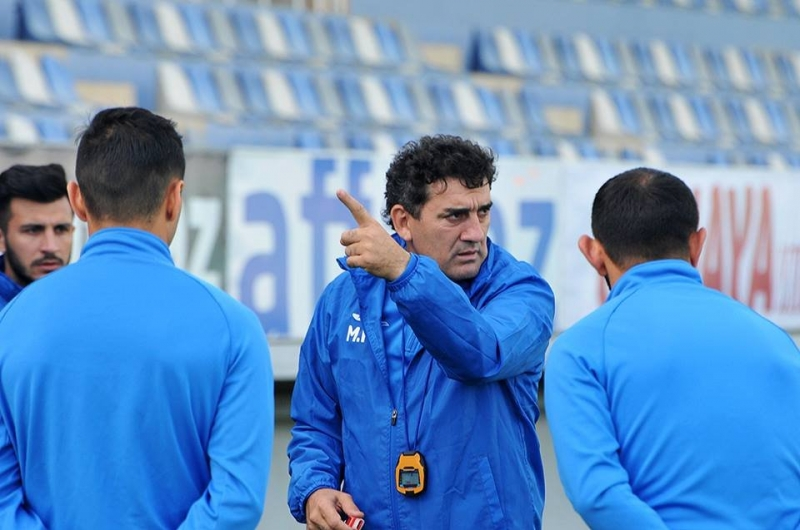

Personal information
- Date of birth: 15 August 1968 (age 58)
- Place of birth: Aghdam, Soviet Union
- Height: 1.84 m (6 ft 0 in)
- Position: Defender

Team information
- Current team: Karvan (head coach)

Senior career*
Years	Team	Apps	(Gls)
1985–1986	Avtomobilist		
1989–1990	Karabakh		
1990–1991	Kur Nur		
1992–1996	Kur Nur	118	(42)
1997	Karabakh	13	(0)
1997–1998	Kur Nur Mingachevir	23	(2)
1998–1999	Dinamo Baku	25	(3)
1999–2000	Kapaz	20	(10)
2000	Neftchi Baku	8	(3)
2001	Shafa Baku	8	(1)
2001–2003	Paykan		
2003–2004	Pegah Gilan		
2004–2005	Turan Tovuz	6	(0)

International career
2000–2003	Azerbaijan	14	(1)

Managerial career
- 2006–2010: Gabala
- 2011: Atyrau
- 2012–2013: Gabala
- 2016: Damash Gilan
- 2017: Keshla
- 2017–2024: Keshla (director of sport)
- 2023–2024: Shamakhi
- 2025–2026: Mingachevir
- 2026–: Karvan
- * Club domestic league appearances and goals

Ramiz Mammadov (born 15 August 1968) is an Azerbaijani football manager, who is currently the head coach of Karvan İK, and a former football player.

He played between 1992 and 2005, for teams such as FC Kapaz (Ganja), Garabag (Agdam), Kur (Mingacevir), Shafa (Baku), and Turan (Tovuz). Toward the end of his career, he played in Iran. He also competed internationally for Azerbaijan.

On 10 July 2026, Ramiz Mammadov was appointed as the head coach of Karvan İK.

== Career statistics ==
Club statistics
Season	Club	League	League		Cup		Other		Total	
Season	Club	League	App	Goals	App	Goals	App	Goals	App	Goals
1992	Kur Nur Mingachevir	Azerbaijan Top League	28	12					28	12
1993	Kur Nur Mingachevir	Azerbaijan Top League	15	4					15	4
1993–94	Kur Nur Mingachevir	Azerbaijan Top League	27	12					27	12
1994–95	Kur Nur Mingachevir	Azerbaijan Top League	18	4					18	4
1995–96	Kur Nur Mingachevir	Azerbaijan Top League	15	6					15	6
1996–97	Kur Nur Mingachevir	Azerbaijan Top League	15	4					15	4
1996–97	Karabakh	Azerbaijan Top League	13	0					13	0
1997–98	Kur Nur Mingachevir	Azerbaijan Top League	23	2					23	2
1998–99	Dinamo Baku	Azerbaijan Top League	25	3					25	3
1999–2000	Kapaz	Azerbaijan Top League	20	10					20	10
2000–01	Neftchi Baku	Azerbaijan Top League	8	3					8	3
2000–01	Shafa Baku	Azerbaijan Top League	8	1					8	1
2001–02	Paykan	Persian Gulf Cup								
2002–03	Paykan	Persian Gulf Cup								
2003–04	Pegah	Persian Gulf Cup								
2004–05	Turan Tovuz	Azerbaijan Top League	6	0					6	0
Total			221	61	0	0	0	0	221	61

== International career ==
Mammadov's only goal for Azerbaijan came on 27 July 2000 in a 1–2 defeat to Macedonia.

=== International statistics ===
Azerbaijan national team
Year	Apps	Goals
2000	4	1
2001	5	0
2002	2	0
2003	2	0
Total	13	1

=== International Goals ===
#	Date	Venue	Opponent	Score	Result	Competition
1.	27 July 2000	Varna, Bulgaria	Macedonia	1-0	1-2	Friendly

== Manager career ==
Mammadov was the head coach for Gabala, before being replaced by ex-England defender Tony Adams.

After leaving Gabala, Mammadov went on to become manager of FC Atyrau at the start of the 2011 Kazakhstan Premier League season. Shortly after taking over as manager of Atyrau, Mammadov caused controversy by stating that Armenian forward Tigran Gharabaghtsyan would not play for the club as long as he is manager. Mammadov resigning as manager after their round 15th match against Tobol on 12 June 2011.

On 24 September 2012, Mammadov was re-appointed as manager of Gabala, replacing the sacked Fatih Kavlak. Mammadov was again sacked as manager of Gabala on 2 April 2013.

On 10 July 2025, Mammadov was appointed head coach of Azerbaijan First League side Mingachevir.

=== Manager statistics ===
As of 13 March 2013

Team	Nat	Managerial Tenure	P	W	D	L	Win %
Gabala	Azerbaijan	2006 – 11 May 2010	118	38	27	53	32.2
Atyrau	Kazakhstan	January 2011 – June 2011	17	4	6	7	23.53
Gabala	Azerbaijan	24 September 2012 – 2 April 2013	21	8	6	7	38.1

== Honours ==
- Kapaz
  - Azerbaijan Cup (1) - 1999–2000
- Shafa Baku
  - Azerbaijan Cup (1) - 2000–2001
