= Aslan Kerimov =

Azerbaijani footballer (born 1973)

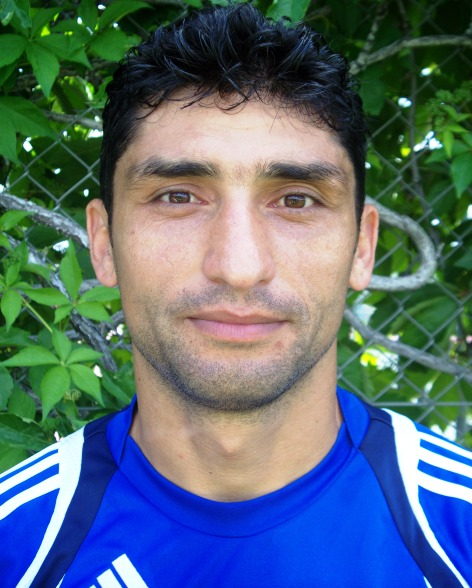

Personal information
- Full name: Aslan Kerimov
- Date of birth: 1 January 1973 (age 53)
- Place of birth: Baku, Azerbaijan SSR, Soviet Union
- Height: 1.74 m (5 ft 8 1/2 in)
- Position: Defender

Senior career*
Years	Team	Apps	(Gls)
1990	Neftchi Baku	0	(0)
1990	MCOP-Termist Baku	5	(0)
1991	Dinamo Baku	28	(0)
1992	Azeri Baku	30	(0)
1992–1997	Qarabağ	96	(0)
1997	Neftchi Baku	20	(1)
1997–1999	Kapaz	17	(0)
1999	Baltika Kaliningrad	5	(0)
1999	ANS Pivani Bakı	19	(1)
2000–2003	Shamkir	22	(0)
2003–2011	Qarabağ	164	(12)
2011	Sumgayit	0	(0)
Total		406	(14)

International career^{‡}
1994–2008	Azerbaijan	80	(1)
- * Club domestic league appearances and goals as of 15 May 2010 ‡ National team caps and goals as of 18 June 2008

Aslan Kerimov (Azerbaijani: Aslan Kərimov; born 1 January 1973) is a retired football midfielder from Azerbaijan. He debuted for the national team in October 1994, and his international career earned him 78 caps.

== Career ==
=== Club ===
He started his career in PFC Neftchi, and has since played, almost all, for FK Ganja, Neftchi (second spell), FK Qarabağ, Baltika Kaliningrad, ANS-Pivani, FK Shamkir and now FK Qarabağ for a second time.

Kerimov retired in November 2011, after Sumgayit's 3–0 defeat to Qarabağ in the Azerbaijan Cup.

== Career statistics ==
=== International ===
Azerbaijan national team
Year	Apps	Goals
1994	1	0
1995	0	0
1996	0	0
1997	7	0
1998	8	0
1999	7	0
2000	4	0
2001	1	0
2002	7	0
2003	7	1
2004	7	0
2005	11	0
2006	8	0
2007	11	0
2008	1	0
Total	80	1

Statistics accurate as of match played 2 February 2008

== Honours ==
=== Club ===
Qarabağ

- Azerbaijan Top League (1): 1993
- Azerbaijan Cup (3): 1993, 2005–06, 2008–09

Kapaz

- Azerbaijan Top League (1): 1998–99

Shamkir

- Azerbaijan Top League (2): 2000–01, 2001–02
