= Elshan Gambarov =

Azerbaijani footballer (born 1972)

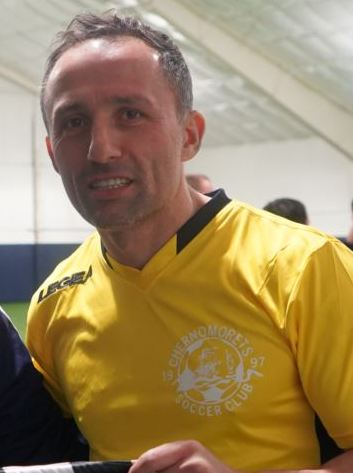

Personal information
- Date of birth: 30 October 1972 (age 53)
- Place of birth: Baku, Azerbaijani SSR, Soviet Union
- Height: 1.74 m (5 ft 9 in)
- Position: Midfielder

Senior career*
Years	Team	Apps	(Gls)
1991	Dinamo Baku	36	(2)
1992	Azneftyağ Baku	20	(4)
1992	Neftçi	12	(2)
1993	Anzhi Makhachkala	21	(4)
1994	Dinamo Makhachkala	15	(5)
1995–1996	Turan Tovuz	40	(6)
1996–1997	Baku Fekhlesi	18	(0)
1997	Bakılı	10	(2)
1998	Navbahor Namangan	15	(7)
1999	Neftçi	9	(0)
2000–2002	Dinamo Samarqand	57	(8)
2002	Navbahor Namangan	11	(0)
2002	Esil Bogatyr	10	(0)
2003	Mash'al Mubarek	4	(0)
2003–2005	Neftçi	31	(0)
2005	Olimpik Baku	8	(0)
2006	Gäncä	12	(1)
2007	Shurtan Guzar	10	(1)
2007–2008	Simurq	9	(1)
2008	Dinamo Samarqand	10	(0)
2008	Baku	8	(0)

International career
1998–2000	Azerbaijan	12	(0)
- * Club domestic league appearances and goals

Elshan Gambarov (Azeri: Elşən Qəmbərov; born 30 October 1972) is a former Azerbaijani footballer (midfielder) who last played for Baku. He was also a member of Azerbaijan national football team.

== Career ==
=== International ===
Gambarov made his debut for the Azerbaijan main team on 16 May 1998 in a friendly match against Estonia.

Uzbekistan national team
Year	Apps	Goals
1998	3	0
1999	7	0
2000	2	0
Total	12	0

Statistics accurate as of match played 11 October 2000.

== Honours ==
Neftçi

- Azerbaijan Premier League: 1992, 2003–04, 2004–05
- Azerbaijan Cup: 1998–1999, 2003–04

Navbahor

- Uzbekistan Cup: 1998
