= 1992 Azerbaijan Cup =

Tournament details
- Country: Azerbaijan
- Teams: 8

Final positions
- Champions: İnşaatçı Baku
- Runners-up: Kur

Tournament statistics
- Matches played: 11
- Goals scored: 31 (2.82 per match)

The Azerbaijan Cup 1992 was the first season of what would become the annual cup competition in Azerbaijan.

== First round ==
1992	Pambygchi Barda	2 – 0	Nidgat Baku	Barda
AZT (UTC+4)				Stadium: Barda City Stadium

1992	Turan Tovuz	1 – 0	Kapaz	Tovuz
AZT (UTC+4)				Stadium: Tovuz City Stadium

1992	Khazar Sumgayit	5 – 0	Azeri Baku	Sumqayit
AZT (UTC+4)				Stadium: Mehdi Huseynzade Stadium

1992	Kürmük Qakh	0 – 1	Neftchi Baku	Qakh
AZT (UTC+4)

== Quarterfinals ==
The four winners from the First Round were joined by four other teams.

1992	Pambygchi Barda	1 – 2	Kur	Barda
AZT (UTC+4)				Stadium: Barda City Stadium

1992	Taraggi Baku	3 – 1	Turan Tovuz	Baku
AZT (UTC+4)

1992	Khazar Sumgayit	5 – 1	Çıraqqala Siyəzən	Sumqayit
AZT (UTC+4)				Stadium: Mehdi Huseynzade Stadium

1992	Neftchi Baku	1 – 2	İnşaatçı Baku	Baku
AZT (UTC+4)				Stadium: Tofik Bakhramov Stadium

== Semifinals ==
The four quarterfinal winners were drawn into two single-legged semifinal ties.

1992 Semi-Final	Kur	2 – 0	Taraggi Baku	Mingachevir
AZST (UTC+5)				Stadium: Yashar Mammadzade Stadium

1992 Semi-Final	İnşaatçı Baku	1 – 1 (5 – 4 p)	Khazar Sumgayit	Baku
AZST (UTC+5)

== Final ==
29 August 1992
AZST (UTC+5)

İnşaatçı Baku	2–1 (a.e.t.)	Kur
Shahriyar Guseinov 27'; Ilkham Aliev 101'		Mekhman Bakhshiev 83'

Tofiq Bahramov Stadium, Baku
Attendance: 4,000
Referee: G.Dgabbarov
