= Musa Qurbanov =

Azerbaijani footballer (born 1964)

Personal information
- Date of birth: 9 November 1964 (age 62)
- Place of birth: Zaqatala, Azerbaijan SSR, Soviet Union
- Position: Forward

Senior career*
Years	Team	Apps	(Gls)
1987	Kapaz		
1988—1989	Göyazan	39	(12)
1989—1990	Neftchi	15	(0)
1990—1991	Kapaz	9	(0)
1991	Daşqın	8	(6)
1991—1992	Göyazan	10	(0)
1992—1993	Daşqın	31	(17)
1993—1996	Turan	64	(56)
1996	Kur-Nur	8	(4)
1996—1997	Neftchi	15	(8)
1997	Dinamo	8	(2)
1997—1998	Neftchi	10	(1)
1998—1999	Bakılı	23	(1)
1999—2000	ANS Pivani	13	(2)
2000—2001	Qarabağ	8	(1)
2003—2004	Dinamo	4	(0)

International career
1992-1993	Azerbaijan	2	(0)
- * Club domestic league appearances and goals

Musa Osman oğlu Qurbanov (born 9 November 1964) is an Azerbaijani former professional footballer who played as a forward. He is the all time topscorer of the Azerbaijan Premier League. He obtained two caps for the national team in 1992–1993.

== Career statistics ==
=== International ===
Azerbaijan
Year	Apps	Goals
1992	1	0
1993	1	0
Total	2	0

== Honours ==
=== Individual ===
- Azerbaijan Premier League Top Scorer (1): 1993–94

== Personal life ==
Musa is the brother of Azerbaijani football manager and former footballer Qurban Qurbanov.
