= Faig Azizov =

Azerbaijani footballer (born 1966)

Personal information
- Full name: Faig Zail oglu Azizov
- Date of birth: 4 November 1966 (age 59)
- Place of birth: Baku, Soviet Union
- Height: 1.88 m (6 ft 2 in)
- Position: Goalkeeper

Team information
- Current team: Azerbaijan U18 (goalkeeper coach)

Senior career*
| Years | Team | Apps | (Gls) |
| 1986–1988 | Amur | | |
| 1988–1994 | Inşaatçı | | |
| 1995–1996 | Khazri | | |
| 1996–1999 | Machine Sazi | | |
| 1999–2000 | Kapaz | | |
| 2000–2001 | Khazar University | | |

Managerial career
- 2004–2005: Azerbaijan U21 (goalkeeper coach)
- 2006–2007: Azerbaijan (goalkeeper coach)
- 2008–2011: Azerbaijan (goalkeeper coach)
- 2012–2013: Al-Taawoun (goalkeeper coach)
- 2013–2014: Najran SC (goalkeeper coach)
- 2014–2015: Qadsia SC (goalkeeper coach)
- 2015–2018: Azerbaijan (goalkeeper coach)
- 2018–2019: Azerbaijan U21 (goalkeeper coach)
- 2019–: Azerbaijan U18 (goalkeeper coach)
- * Club domestic league appearances and goals

Faig Zail oglu Azizov (born 4 November 1966) is a retired Azerbaijani footballer who played as a goalkeeper.

== Honours ==
Inşaatçı

- Azerbaijan Cup
  - Winner (1): 1992
