= 1992 Azerbaijan Top League =

Azerbaijan Top League
- Season: 1992
- Champions: Neftchi Baku (1st title)
- Relegated: Plastik Salyan; Şirvan Şamaxı; Avtomobilçi Yevlax; Çıraqqala Siyəzən; Göyazan Qazax; Energetik Əli-Bayramlı; Şirvan Kürdəmir
- Matches played: 438
- Goals scored: 1,271 (2.9 per match)
- Top goalscorer: Nazim Aliyev (39 goals)
- Biggest home win: Kəpəz 13-1 Ümid
- Biggest away win: Şirvan Kürdəmir 2-7 Kürmük Qakh
- Highest scoring: Kəpəz 13-1 Ümid

The 1992 Azerbaijan Top League was the first season of the Azerbaijan Top League, since their independence from the USSR in August 1991, and was contested by 26 clubs. The Season took place between 3 May and 30 October 1992 and was won by Neftchi Baku, with six teams being relegated to the Azerbaijan First Division for the 1993 season. During the '92 season a win was awarded 2 points, a draw 1 and no points were awarded for a defeat.

== Stadia and locations ==
Location of teams in 2012–13 Azerbaijan Premier League

Note: Table lists in alphabetical order.

Team	Location	Venue	Capacity
Avei Agstafa	Ağstafa		
Avtomobilçi Yevlax	Yevlakh		
Azeri Baku	Baku		
Çıraqqala Siyəzən	Siyəzən		
Daşqın Zaqatala	Zaqatala		
Energetik Əli-Bayramlı	Shirvan		
Kapaz	Ganja	Ganja City Stadium	26,120
Göyazan Qazax	Qazax	Qazakh City Stadium	3,500
İnşaatçı Baku	Baku		
İnşaatçı Sabirabad	Sabirabad		
Karabakh Agdam	Quzanlı	Guzanli Olympic Complex Stadium	2,000
Khazar Lankaran	Lankaran		
Khazar Sumgayit	Sumgayit	Mehdi Huseynzade Stadium	15,350
Kur	Mingachevir	Yashar Mammadzade Stadium	5,000
Kürmük Qakh	Qakh		
FK Masallı	Masallı	Anatoliy Banishevskiy Stadium	7,500
Neftchi Baku	Baku	Tofiq Bahramov Stadium	31,200
Nefteqaz	Qusar	Shovkat Ordukhanov Stadium	5,000
Nicat Maştağa	Baku	Ismat Gayibov Stadium	5,000
Pambygchi Barda	Barda	Barda City Stadium	10,000
Plastik Salyan	Salyan		
Şirvan Kürdəmir	Şilyan		
Şirvan Şamaxı	Şamaxı		
Taraggi Baku	Baku		
Turan Tovuz	Tovuz	Tovuz City Stadium	6,800
Ümid	Cəlilabad		

== First round ==
=== Group A ===
==== Table ====
Pos	Team	Pld	W	D	L	GF	GA	GD	Pts	Qualification
1	PFC Neftchi Baku	24	23	0	1	68	10	+58	46	Qualification for championship group
2	Khazar Sumgayit	24	21	1	2	68	6	+62	43	Qualification for championship group
3	İnşaatçı Baku	24	16	4	4	40	16	+24	36	Qualification for championship group
4	Kur	24	15	1	8	30	19	+11	31	Qualification for championship group
5	Ümid	24	10	3	11	34	45	−11	23	Qualification for championship group
6	Nefteqaz	24	8	7	9	20	25	−5	23	Qualification for championship group
7	FK Masallı	24	10	2	12	24	30	−6	22	Qualification for relegation group
8	Khazar Lankaran	24	8	5	11	23	34	−11	21	Qualification for relegation group
9	Avtomobilçi Yevlax	24	8	5	11	21	41	−20	21	Qualification for relegation group
10	Çıraqqala Siyəzən	24	8	2	14	18	47	−29	18	Qualification for relegation group
11	Şirvan Şamaxı	24	8	1	15	22	50	−28	17	Qualification for relegation group
12	Energetik Əli-Bayramlı	24	4	3	17	18	63	−45	11	Qualification for relegation group
13	Nicat Maştağa	24	0	0	24	-	-	—	0	Team excluded (Note: Nicat Maştağa results annulled, but allowed to keep place the following year)

Source: Azerbaijan Professional Football league
Rules for classification: 1) points; 2) goal difference; 3) number of goals scored.

==== Results ====
Home \ Away	AYV	CSI	EƏB	INB	KHA	KHS	KUR	MAS	NEF	NEQ	SSM	ÜMD
Avtomobilçi Yevlax		2–0	1–1	0–0	1–0	0–0	0–1	2–1	1–3	1–1	2–3	4–3
Çıraqqala Siyəzən	1–0		2–1	1–3	2–1	1–2	3–1	0–0	0–4	1–1	3–0	2–0
Energetik Əli-Bayramlı	0–1	1–0		2–2	1–2	0–4	1–2	1–3	2–7	2–0	1–2	2–2
İnşaatçı Baku	3–0	3–0	2–0		4–1	0–1	1–0	3–1	0–2	2–1	6–0	3–1
Khazar Lankaran	0–0	3–1	6–0	0–1		0–1	0–1	3–0	0–3	0–0	3–1	2–0
Khazar Sumgayit	6–1	8–1	4–0	2–0	5–0		1–0	5–0	3–0	1–0	7–1	4–0
Kur	2–1	5–0	3–2	0–0	3–0	1–0		1–0	0–2	2–0	3–1	2–1
FK Masallı	3–0	1–0	2–1	1–2	2–0	0–1	1–0		0–1	1–1	3–1	4–1
Neftçi Baku	6–1	4–0	4–0	2–0	6–0	1–0	1–0	1–0		3–0	8–1	4–0
Nefteqaz	2–1	1–0	3–0	0–0	1–1	0–3	1–0	2–0	0–1		3–0	1–1
Şirvan Şamaxı	0–1	3–0	3–0	0–2	0–0	0–1	1–2	2–1	0–1	2–0		0–1
Ümid	5–1	3–0 (Note: Walkover.)	3–0	1–3	1–1	0–3	2–1	2–0	2–4	3–2	2–1	

Source: APL: Yüksək dəstə – 1992
Legend: Blue = home team win; Yellow = draw; Red = away team win.

=== Group B ===
==== Table ====
Pos	Team	Pld	W	D	L	GF	GA	GD	Pts	Qualification
1	Turan Tovuz	24	18	1	5	40	11	+29	37	Qualification for championship group
2	Kapaz	24	14	6	4	54	18	+36	34	Qualification for championship group
3	Karabakh Agdam	24	13	6	5	50	17	+33	32	Qualification for championship group
4	İnşaatçı Sabirabad	24	13	4	7	28	18	+10	30	Qualification for championship group
5	Taraggi Baku	24	10	5	9	24	20	+4	25	Qualification for championship group
6	Kürmük Qakh	24	9	6	9	48	45	+3	24	Qualification for championship group
7	Avei Agstafa	24	11	1	12	30	33	−3	23	Qualification for relegation group
8	Daşqın Zaqatala	24	10	3	11	33	32	+1	23	Qualification for relegation group
9	Azeri Baku	24	10	2	12	33	38	−5	22	Qualification for relegation group
10	Pambygchi Barda	24	9	4	11	26	35	−9	22	Qualification for relegation group
11	Plastik Salyan	24	10	1	13	32	40	−8	21	Qualification for relegation group
12	Göyazan Qazax	24	7	2	15	27	44	−17	16	Qualification for relegation group
13	Şirvan Kürdəmir	24	1	1	22	10	84	−74	3	Qualification for relegation group

Source: Azerbaijan Professional Football league
Rules for classification: 1) points; 2) goal difference; 3) number of goals scored.

==== Results ====
Home \ Away	AVA	AZB	DZG	ATM	INS	KAP	KQU	ABB	PLA	QAR	SKU	TAR	TUR
Avei Agstafa		3–0 (Note: Walkover.)	1–0	1–0	2–0	3–1	4–2	1–0	2–1	0–0	3–0	2–0	0–1
Azeri Baku	2–0		2–0	0–0	3–1	0–0	3–0	3–2	3–1	0–4	8–0	0–1	0–2
Daşqın Zaqatala	1–0	2–0		2–1	0–1	1–1	2–0	4–0	2–0	3–2	4–0	2–1	0–1
Göyəzən	2–1	3–0	2–2		1–3	2–1	4–2	0–2	2–1	0–2	3–0	3–0	0–3
İnşaatçı Sabirabad	3–0	3–1	2–1	3–0		1–0	0–0	1–0	1–1	0–0	3–0	1–0	1–0
Kapaz	4–0	7–0	3–0	3–2	3–0		3–0	3–0	5–0	2–1	3–0	2–0	2–1
Kürmük Qakh	5–1	3–2	1–0	3–1	0–0	4–4		3–2	5–1	2–2	6–0	0–0	3–0
Pambygchi Barda	2–1	0–1	1–1	3–0	2–0	0–0	3–1		1–0	2–1	3–0	0–0	1–0
Plastik Salyan	1–0	3–0	2–0	3–0	1–0	0–3	6–1	3–1		0–2	3–0	2–1	0–1
Qarabağ	1–0	2–1	4–0	3–0	1–2	0–0	4–0	5–0	4–1		6–0	1–0	1–1
Şirvan Kürdəmir	2–5	0–3	1–5	2–1	0–2	1–3	2–7	0–0	1–2	0–3		1–2	0–3
Taraggi Baku	1–0	0–1	2–1	1–0	1–0	1–1	0–0	5–0	2–0	1–1	3–0		1–0
Turan	4–0	1–0	4–0	3–0	1–0	1–0	1–0	2–1	3–0	2–0	3–0	2–1	

Source: APL: Yüksək dəstə – 1992
Legend: Blue = home team win; Yellow = draw; Red = away team win.

== Second round ==
=== Championship group ===
==== Table ====
Pos	Team	Pld	W	D	L	GF	GA	GD	Pts
1	Neftchi Baku (C)	36	30	2	4	104	23	+81	62
2	Khazar Sumgayit	36	27	3	6	100	24	+76	57
3	Turan Tovuz	36	26	4	6	62	24	+38	56
4	Karabakh Agdam	36	24	7	5	76	26	+50	55
5	Kapaz	36	23	8	5	98	29	+69	54
6	İnşaatçı Baku	36	21	6	9	52	28	+24	48
7	Kur	36	19	3	14	50	39	+11	41
8	İnşaatçı Sabirabad	36	14	6	16	36	42	−6	34
9	Taraggi Baku	36	13	6	17	39	49	−10	32
10	Kürmük Qakh	36	12	7	17	57	82	−25	31
11	Ümid	36	12	5	19	48	78	−30	29
12	Nefteqaz	36	11	7	18	34	54	−20	29

Source: Azerbaijan Professional Football league
Rules for classification: 1) points; 2) goal difference; 3) number of goals scored.
(C) Champions

==== Results ====
Home \ Away	INB	INS	KAP	KHS	KQU	KUR	NEF	NEQ	QAR	TAR	TUR	ÜMD
İnşaatçı Baku		1–0	0–0		2–0				1–2	3–0	1–2	
İnşaatçı Sabirabad	0–1			0–2		0–2	0–1	2–0				1–1
Kapaz	3–0 (Note: Walkover.)			4–3		3–1	1–0	5–1				13–1
Khazar Sumgayit		2–1	2–2		8–0				0–1	4–2	2–2	
Kürmük Qakh	1–1			0–3		1–0	2–6	3–0				2–1
Kur		2–1	1–4		3–0				0–2	5–1	2–2	
Neftçi Baku		7–1	2–1		8–1				1–1	6–1	1–1	
Nefteqaz		3–0	0–5		2–0				1–3	3–0	2–3	
Qarabağ	2–0			2–1		3–2	2–1	4–1				2–0
Taraggi Baku	1–2			1–3		1–1	1–3	2–1				2–1
Turan	1–0			3–2		2–1	1–0	2–0				3–0
Ümid		2–2	0–3		4–0				1–3	1–2	2–0	

Source: APL: Yüksək dəstə – 1992
Legend: Blue = home team win; Yellow = draw; Red = away team win.

=== Relegation group ===
Pos	Team	Pld	W	D	L	GF	GA	GD	Pts	Relegation
13	Avei Agstafa	38	20	2	16	49	54	−5	42	
14	FK Masallı	38	19	4	15	54	41	+13	42	
15	Khazar Lankaran	38	17	8	13	40	44	−4	42	
16	Daşqın Zaqatala	38	19	3	16	48	52	−4	41	
17	Pambygchi Barda	38	17	7	14	42	44	−2	41	
18	Azeri Baku	38	17	6	15	53	49	+4	40	
19	Plastik Salyan (R)	38	18	2	18	44	60	−16	38	Relegation to Azerbaijan First Division
20	Şirvan Şamaxı (R)	38	16	2	20	42	67	−25	34	Relegation to Azerbaijan First Division
21	Avtomobilçi Yevlax (R)	38	13	8	17	33	58	−25	34	Relegation to Azerbaijan First Division
22	Çıraqqala Siyəzən (R)	38	15	2	21	35	68	−33	32	Relegation to Azerbaijan First Division
23	Göyazan Qazax (R)	38	12	2	24	37	70	−33	26	Relegation to Azerbaijan First Division
24	Energetik Əli-Bayramlı (R)	38	7	3	28	28	91	−63	17	Relegation to Azerbaijan First Division
25	Şirvan Kürdəmir (R)	26	3	1	22	10	84	−74	7	Team excluded (Note: Şirvan Kürdəmir were excluded from the league for an unknown reason.)
26	Nicat Maştağa	38	0	0	38	-	-	—	0	Team excluded (Note: Nicat Maştağa results annulled, but allowed to keep place the following year)

Source: Azerbaijan Professional Football league
Rules for classification: 1) points; 2) goal difference; 3) number of goals scored.
(R) Relegated

==== Results ====
Home \ Away	AVA	AYV	AZB	CSI	DZG	EƏB	GQZ	KHA	MAS	ABB	PLA	SKU	SSM
Avei Agstafa		2–0		2–1		3–0 (Note: Walkover.)		1–1	2–0				2–1
Avtomobilçi Yevlax	5–1		1–1		2–1		2–0			0–0	1–1	3–0	
Azeri Baku		4–0		2–0		4–2		0–1	1–1				3–0
Çıraqqala Siyəzən	1–2		2–1		3–0		3–0			3–1	3–2	3–0	
Daşqın Zaqatala		2–1		2–1		2–0		2–0	1–0				2–0
Energetik Əli-Bayramlı	1–4		1–2		0–3		3–0			1–2	0–3	3–0	
Göyazan Qazax		3–0		3–0		2–1		0–2	0–1				1–3
Khazar Lankaran	2–0		1–1		2–1		3–1			2–1	2–1	3–0	
FK Masallı	3–0		1–1		8–0		6–0			2–1	4–2	3–0	
Pambygchi Barda		1–0		3–0		1–0		1–1	2–0				3–0
Plastik Salyan		1–0		3–0		2–1		1–0	1–4				5–2
Şirvan Kürdəmir		0–3		0–3		0–3		0–3	0–3				0–3
Şirvan Şamaxı	6–0		2–1		1–0		2–0			0–0	3–0	3–0	

Source: APL: Yüksək dəstə – 1992
Legend: Blue = home team win; Yellow = draw; Red = away team win.

== Season statistics ==
=== Top scorers ===
Rank	Player	Club	Goals
1	(Azerbaijan) Nazim Aliyev	Khazar Sumgayit	39
2	(Azerbaijan) Samir Alakbarov	Neftchi	36
3	(Azerbaijan) Mehman Allahverdiyev	Kəpəz	30
4	(Azerbaijan) Yunis Huseynov	Neftchi	29
5	(Azerbaijan) Azər İsayev	Khazar Sumgayit	18
6	(Azerbaijan) Əlövsət Bayramov	Kürmük Qakh	15
6	(Azerbaijan) İlham Məmmədov	Turan Tovuz	15
8	(Azerbaijan) Gurban Gurbanov	Daşqın Zaqatala	13
8	(Azerbaijan) Əli Abışov	Plastik Salyan	13
8	(Azerbaijan) Mahir Əliyev	Qarabağ	13

=== Clean sheets ===
- Most clean sheets: 20
  - Turan Tovuz
- Fewest clean sheets: 0
  - Şirvan Kürdəmir
