= 1999–2000 Azerbaijan Top League =

Azerbaijan Top League
- Season: 1999–2000
- Champions: Shamkir
- Relegated: MOIK Baku
- Champions League: Shamkir
- UEFA Cup: Gäncä; Neftchi Baku
- Matches played: 242
- Goals scored: 313 (1.29 per match)
- Top goalscorer: Badri Kvaratskhelia (16)

The 1999–2000 Azerbaijan Top League was contested by twelve clubs and won by FK Shamkir.

== Teams ==
=== Stadia and locations ===
Location of teams in Azerbaijan Premier League 1998–99

| Team | Venue | Capacity |
|---|---|---|
| Bakı Fahlasi | Ismat Gayibov Stadium | 5,000 |
| Dinamo Baku | Tofik Bakhramov Stadium | 29,858 |
| Khazar University | | |
| Kapaz | Ganja City Stadium | 26,120 |
| Qarabağ | Guzanli Olympic Stadium^{1} | 15,000 |
| Kimyachi Sumgayit | | |
| MOIK Baku | Shafa Stadium (IV field) | 8,152 |
| Neftchi Baku | Tofik Bakhramov Stadium | 29,858 |
| Shafa Baku | Shafa Stadium (IV field) | 8,152 |
| Shamkir | | |
| Turan Tovuz | Tovuz City Stadium | 10,000 |
| Viləş Masallı | Anatoliy Banishevskiy Stadium | 8,000 |

^{1}Qarabağ played their home matches at Surakhani Stadium in Baku before moving to their current stadium on 3 May 2009.

== League table ==
| Pos | Team | Pld | W | D | L | GF | GA | GD | Pts | Qualification or relegation |
|---|---|---|---|---|---|---|---|---|---|---|
| 1 | Shamkir (C) | 22 | 17 | 4 | 1 | 46 | 11 | +35 | 55 | Qualification for Champions League first qualifying round |
| 2 | Kapaz | 22 | 14 | 2 | 6 | 46 | 24 | +22 | 44 | Qualification for UEFA Cup qualifying round |
| 3 | Neftchi Baku | 22 | 13 | 4 | 5 | 35 | 17 | +18 | 43 | Qualification for UEFA Cup qualifying round |
| 4 | FK Masallı | 22 | 11 | 3 | 8 | 28 | 25 | +3 | 36 | Qualification for Intertoto Cup first round |
| 5 | Bakı Fahlasi Maştağa | 22 | 10 | 2 | 10 | 24 | 28 | −4 | 32 | |
| 6 | Dinamo Baki | 22 | 9 | 4 | 9 | 21 | 17 | +4 | 31 | |
| 7 | Shafa Baku | 22 | 8 | 3 | 11 | 22 | 32 | −10 | 27 | |
| 8 | Karabakh Agdam | 22 | 5 | 10 | 7 | 21 | 25 | −4 | 25 | |
| 9 | Kimyachi Sumgayit | 22 | 7 | 1 | 14 | 23 | 34 | −11 | 22 | |
| 10 | Turan Tovuz | 22 | 5 | 5 | 12 | 17 | 36 | −19 | 20 | |
| 11 | Khazar University | 22 | 5 | 3 | 14 | 19 | 41 | −22 | 18 | |
| 12 | MOIK Baku (R) | 22 | 3 | 3 | 16 | 11 | 41 | −30 | 12 | Relegation to Azerbaijan First Division |

Source: Azerbaijan Professional Football league
Rules for classification: 1) points; 2) goal difference; 3) number of goals scored.
(C) Champions; (R) Relegated

== Results ==
| Home \ Away | BFA | DIN | KHU | KAP | KHS | MOI | NEF | QAR | SHB | SHA | TUR | MAS |
|---|---|---|---|---|---|---|---|---|---|---|---|---|
| Bakı Fahlasi | | 0–1 | 4–1 | 0–3 | 1–0 | 1–1 | 1–0 | 2–2 | 3–1 | 0–3 | 1–0 | 1–0 |
| Dinamo Baku | 1–0 | | 3–1 | 0–2 | 0–1 | 4–0 | 0–2 | 1–0 | 0–0 | 0–2 | 2–0 | 2–1 |
| Khazar University | 1–0 | 0–2 | | 3–1 | 2–1 | 2–0 | 2–3 | 0–0 | 0–1 | 0–2 | 0–0 | 0–0 |
| Kapaz | 2–1 | 1–0 | 4–2 | | 2–0 | 5–1 | 1–0 | 1–1 | 1–0 | 0–0 | 9–0 | 3–0 |
| Khazar Sumgayit | 0–1 | 1–0 | 1–0 | 2–3 | | 2–0 | 1–2 | 1–0 | 4–2 | 0–0 | 4–1 | 1–3 |
| MOIK Baku | 2–1 | 0–0 | 0–2 | 1–2 | 2–1 | | 1–2 | 1–1 | 0–1 | 0–3 | 1–0 | 0–2 |
| Neftçi Baku | – (Note: The matches of the 8th round between Şəmkir and Khazar Sumgayit, Neftçi Baku and Bakı Fahlasi and Qarabağ and MOIK Baku were rated 0–3 for both teams.) | 1–0 | 5–1 | 3–1 | 4–0 | 1–0 | | 2–0 | 2–0 | 0–0 | 1–1 | 3–0 |
| Qarabağ | 3–0 | 0–0 | 2–0 | 2–1 | 3–2 | – | 1–1 | | 2–0 | 1–5 | 0–0 | 0–0 |
| Shafa Baku | 0–2 | 0–3 | 2–1 | 3–2 | 2–0 | 3–0 (Note: Walkover.) | 0–0 | 2–2 | | 0–2 | 1–0 | 3–1 |
| Şəmkir | 1–0 | 2–0 | 6–0 | 2–1 | – | 3–1 | 2–0 | 1–0 | 2–0 | | 2–1 | 2–0 |
| Turan | 2–3 | 2–1 | 2–1 | 0–1 | 1–0 | 1–0 | 0–2 | 0–0 | 3–0 | 3–3 | | 0–1 |
| Viləş FK | 1–2 | 1–1 | 2–0 | 3–0 | 2–1 | 1–0 | 2–1 | 2–1 | 2–1 | 1–3 | 3–0 | |

Source: APL: Yüksək dəstə - 1999-2000
Legend: Blue = home team win; Yellow = draw; Red = away team win.

== Season statistics ==
=== Top scorers ===
| Rank | Player | Club | Goals |
|---|---|---|---|
| 1 | (Georgia (country)) Badri Kvaratskhelia | Shamkir | 16 |
| 2 | (Azerbaijan) Rövşən Əhmədov | Gäncä | 13 |
| 3 | (Azerbaijan) Viktor Kulikov | Shamkir | 12 |
| 4 | (Azerbaijan) Ramiz Mammadov | Gäncä | 10 |
| 4 | (Azerbaijan) Khagani Mammadov | ANS Pivani Bakı | 9 |
| 6 | (Azerbaijan) Pasha Aliyev | Dinamo Baku | 8 |
| 6 | (Azerbaijan) Alay Bəhramov | Vilash Masalli | 8 |
| 6 | (Azerbaijan) Nazim Aliyev | Kimyachi Sumgayit | 8 |
| 6 | (Azerbaijan) Vadim Vasilyev | Neftchi | 8 |
| 6 | (Azerbaijan) Nadir Nabiyev | Turan Tovuz | 8 |
