= Nosenko =

Nosenko (Ukrainian: Носенко) is a Ukrainian surname. Notable people with the surname include:

- Ivan Nosenko (1902–1956), Soviet politician
- Vladislav Nosenko (born 1969), Azerbaijani footballer
- Yuri Nosenko (1927–2008), KGB officer who defected to US.
