= 1993 Azerbaijan Top League =

Azerbaijan Top League
- Season: 1993
- Champions: Qarabağ FK
- Relegated: FK Daşqın Zaqatala; Boz Qurd Samukh; Nefteqaz; Avei Agstafa; Azneftyağ Baku; Ümid
- Matches played: 184
- Goals scored: 474 (2.58 per match)
- Top goalscorer: Samir Alakbarov (16)

The 1993 Azerbaijan Top League was the second season of the Azerbaijan Top League and was contested by 20 clubs with 2 points awarded for a win, 1 for a draw and no points were awarded for a defeat. Neftchi Baku were unable to defend their championship, with Karabakh Agdam becoming the champions.

The 20 participating teams where divided into two groups of 10, and faced each other twice. The top two clubs at the end of the 18 games qualified for the championship play-off matches, whilst the bottom three clubs were relegated. However Nefteqaz were spared relegation after Daşqın Zaqatala were relegated due to their financial problems. At the start of the season Taraggi Baku changed their name to Azneftyag Baku, whilst newly promoted Kyur Samukh became Boz Qurd Samukh.

== Stadia and locations ==
Location of teams in 1993 Azerbaijan Top League

Note: Table lists in alphabetical order.

Team	Location	Venue	Capacity
Avei Agstafa	Ağstafa		
Azeri Baku	Baku		
Azneftyag Baku	Baku		
Boz Qurd Samukh	Samukh		
Daşqın Zaqatala	Zaqatala		
İnşaatçı Baku	Baku		
İnşaatçı Sabirabad	Sabirabad		
Kapaz	Ganja	Ganja City Stadium	26,120
Khazar Lankaran	Lankaran		
Khazar Sumgayit	Sumgayit	Mehdi Huseynzade Stadium	15,350
Kur	Mingachevir	Yashar Mammadzade Stadium	5,000
Kürmük Qakh	Qakh		
FK Masallı	Masallı	Anatoliy Banishevskiy Stadium	7,500
Neftchi Baku	Baku	Tofiq Bahramov Stadium	31,200
Nefteqaz	Qusar	Shovkat Ordukhanov Stadium	5,000
Nicat Maştağa	Baku	Ismat Gayibov Stadium	5,000
Pambygchi Barda	Barda	Barda City Stadium	10,000
Qarabağ	Quzanlı	Guzanli Olympic Complex Stadium	2,000
Turan Tovuz	Tovuz	Tovuz City Stadium	6,800
Ümid	Cəlilabad		

== First round ==
=== Group A ===
==== Table ====
Pos	Team	Pld	W	D	L	GF	GA	GD	Pts	Qualification or relegation
1	Kapaz	18	13	4	1	48	13	+35	30	Qualification for play-offs
2	Turan Tovuz	18	12	6	0	34	4	+30	30	Qualification for play-offs
3	PFC Neftchi Baku	18	11	5	2	39	11	+28	27	
4	Khazar Lankaran	18	8	5	5	23	20	+3	21	
5	Pambygchi Barda	18	7	4	7	17	21	−4	18	
6	Kur	18	6	6	6	21	25	−4	18	
7	Nicat Maştağa	18	7	1	10	23	27	−4	15	
8	Avei Agstafa (R)	18	3	5	10	11	26	−15	11	Relegation to Azerbaijan First Division
9	Azneftyag Baku (R)	18	3	2	13	12	33	−21	8	Relegation to Azerbaijan First Division
10	Ümid (R)	18	0	2	16	8	56	−48	2	Relegation to Azerbaijan First Division

Source: Azerbaijan Professional Football league
Rules for classification: 1) points; 2) goal difference; 3) number of goals scored.
(R) Relegated

==== Results ====
Home \ Away	AVA	KAP	KHA	KUR	NEF	NMS	ABB	TAR	TUR	ÜMD
Avei Agstafa		0–3 (Note: Walkover.)	0–4	1–1	0–2	0–1	1–0	2–0	0–3	0–0
Kapaz	3–0		5–1	4–1	2–0	1–0	1–1	4–0	2–2	3–0
Khazar Lankaran	1–1	1–2		2–1	1–0	1–0	0–0	1–1	2–4	2–0
Kur	2–0	2–2	1–0		0–0	2–2	0–2	1–0	0–3	2–1
PFC Neftchi Baku	1–1	2–0	1–0	2–2		2–1	5–2	3–1	0–0	7–0
Nicat Maştağa	1–0	3–6	2–3	4–1	0–3		0–1	2–1	0–3	2–0
Pambygchi Barda	2–0	0–4	0–0	0–1	0–5	1–0		1–0	0–1	2–2
Azneftyag Baku	0–0	0–3	1–2	2–1	1–3	0–1	0–2		0–3	2–0
Turan Tovuz	1–0	0–0	0–0	0–0	0–0	1–0	1–0	2–0		4–0
Ümid	1–5	0–3	1–2	0–3	0–3	1–4	0–3	2–3	0–6	

Source: APL: Yüksək dəstə - 1993
Legend: Blue = home team win; Yellow = draw; Red = away team win.

=== Group B ===
==== Table ====
Pos	Team	Pld	W	D	L	GF	GA	GD	Pts	Qualification or relegation
1	Karabakh Agdam (C)	18	9	7	2	23	11	+12	25	Qualification for play-offs
2	Khazar Sumgayit	18	11	2	5	29	15	+14	24	Qualification for play-offs
3	Daşqın Zaqatala (R)	18	9	3	6	30	22	+8	21	Relegation to Azerbaijan First Division
4	Azeri Baku	18	9	1	8	23	28	−5	19	
5	İnşaatçı Baku	18	7	4	7	28	22	+6	18	
6	FK Masallı	18	7	3	8	21	24	−3	17	
7	Kürmük Qakh	18	6	5	7	25	26	−1	17	
8	İnşaatçı Sabirabad (R)	18	5	6	7	21	22	−1	16	Relegation to Azerbaijan First Division
9	Boz Qurd Samukh (R)	18	4	6	8	19	30	−11	14	Relegation to Azerbaijan First Division
10	Nefteqaz	18	3	3	12	19	38	−19	9	

Source: Azerbaijan Professional Football league
Rules for classification: 1) points; 2) goal difference; 3) number of goals scored.
(C) Champions; (R) Relegated

==== Results ====
Home \ Away	AZB	BQS	DZG	INB	INS	KHS	KQU	MAS	NEQ	QAR
Azeri Baku		2–1	1–0	2–1	1–0	1–0	3–0	2–0	3–2	0–1
Boz Qurd Samukh	2–2		1–2	3–0	1–0	0–2	0–2	0–0	2–1	2–2
Daşqın Zaqatala	2–1	0–0		2–0	2–0	1–2	4–1	3–1	5–0	2–0
İnşaatçı Baku	4–0	5–1	2–2		0–0	2–0	4–1	3–2	2–1	0–0
İnşaatçı Sabirabad	3–1	3–1	1–2	1–1		3–2	1–1	3–1	3–0 (Note: Walkover.)	0–0
Khazar Sumgayit	4–1	2–2	1–0	2–0	1–0		1–0	5–1	3–0	1–0
Kürmük Qakh	4–1	3–0	2–2	2–0	4–0	1–1		2–1	1–1	1–1
FK Masallı	1–0	1–1	3–0	1–0	1–0	1–0	2–0		2–0	0–0
Nefteqaz	1–2	1–2	3–1	0–3	1–1	1–2	3–0	3–2		1–1
Qarabağ	2–0	2–0	3–0	2–1	2–2	1–0	1–0	2–1	3–0	

Source: APL: Yüksək dəstə - 1993
Legend: Blue = home team win; Yellow = draw; Red = away team win.

== Championship play-offs ==
=== Semifinals ===
27 July 1993

Kapaz	0 – 0	Khazar Sumgayit
Penalties
	3 – 4

18 July 1993

Karabakh Agdam	1 – 0 (a.e.t.)	Turan Tovuz
U. Guseinov 102'

=== Final ===
1 August 1993

Karabakh Agdam	1 – 0	Khazar Sumgayit
Y. Guseinov 36'

== Season statistics ==
=== Top scorers ===
Rank	Player	Club	Goals
1	(Azerbaijan) Samir Alakbarov	Neftchi	16
2	(Azerbaijan) Gurban Gurbanov	Daşqın Zaqatala	11
2	(Azerbaijan) Nazim Aliyev	Khazar Sumgayit	11
4	(Azerbaijan) Mehman Allahverdiyev	Gäncä	10
4	(Azerbaijan) Musa Qurbanov	Daşqın Zaqatala	10
6	(Azerbaijan) İmamyar Süleymanov	Gäncä	9
7	(Azerbaijan) Fikrət Hüseynov	İnşaatçı Baku	8
7	(Azerbaijan) Alay Bəhramov	FK Masallı	8
7	(Azerbaijan) Fazil Əsədov	Khazar Lenkoran	8
10	(Azerbaijan) Məqsəd Yaqubəliyev	Turan Tovuz	7
