= Khagani Mammadov =

Azerbaijani footballer (born 1976)

Khagani Mamedov
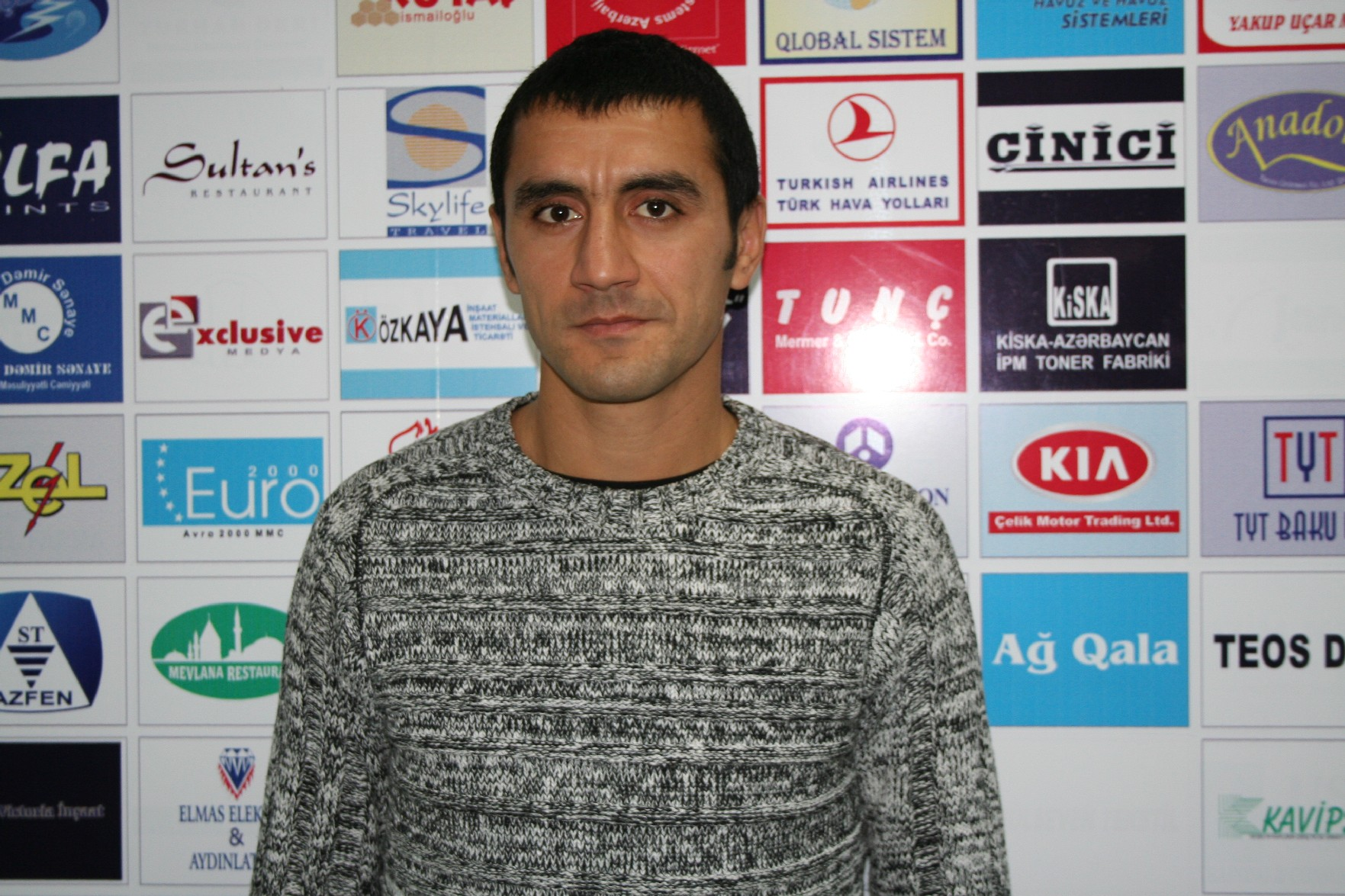

Personal information
- Date of birth: 29 September 1976 (age 50)
- Place of birth: Baku, Azerbaijan
- Height: 1.75 m (5 ft 9 in)
- Position: Forward

Senior career*
Years	Team	Apps	(Gls)
1993–1998	Neftchi Baku	69	(13)
1996–1997	→ Khazar Sumgayit (loan)	12	(7)
1998–1999	MOIK Baku	20	(5)
1999–2000	ANS Pivani Bakı	19	(9)
2000–2002	Shamkir	35	(19)
2002–2004	Machine Sazi	?	(?)
2004–2006	Khazar Lankaran	41	(8)
2006–2007	Olimpik Baku	23	(13)
2007–2009	Inter Baku	35	(22)
2009–2010	Karvan	13	(7)
2010	Khazar Lankaran	7	(0)
2010	MOIK Baku	0	(0)

International career^{‡}
1997–2008	Azerbaijan	20	(1)
- * Club domestic league appearances and goals as of July 2009 ‡ National team caps and goals as of 23 March 2009

Khagani Mammadov (Azerbaijani: Xəqani Məmmədov; born 29 September 1976) is an Azerbaijani footballer (striker). Mammadov received 20 international caps for the Azerbaijan national football team, scoring one goal.

He scored the most goals in Azerbaijani Premier League with Inter Baku in 2007–08 season.

== National team statistics ==
Azerbaijan national team
Year	Apps	Goals
1997	4	0
1998	3	1
2002	2	0
2003	2	0
2007	6	0
2008	3	0
Total	20	1

=== International goals ===
#	Date	Venue	Opponent	Score	Result	Competition
1	28 November 1998	Ganja	Estonia	2–1	Win	Friendly

== Honours ==
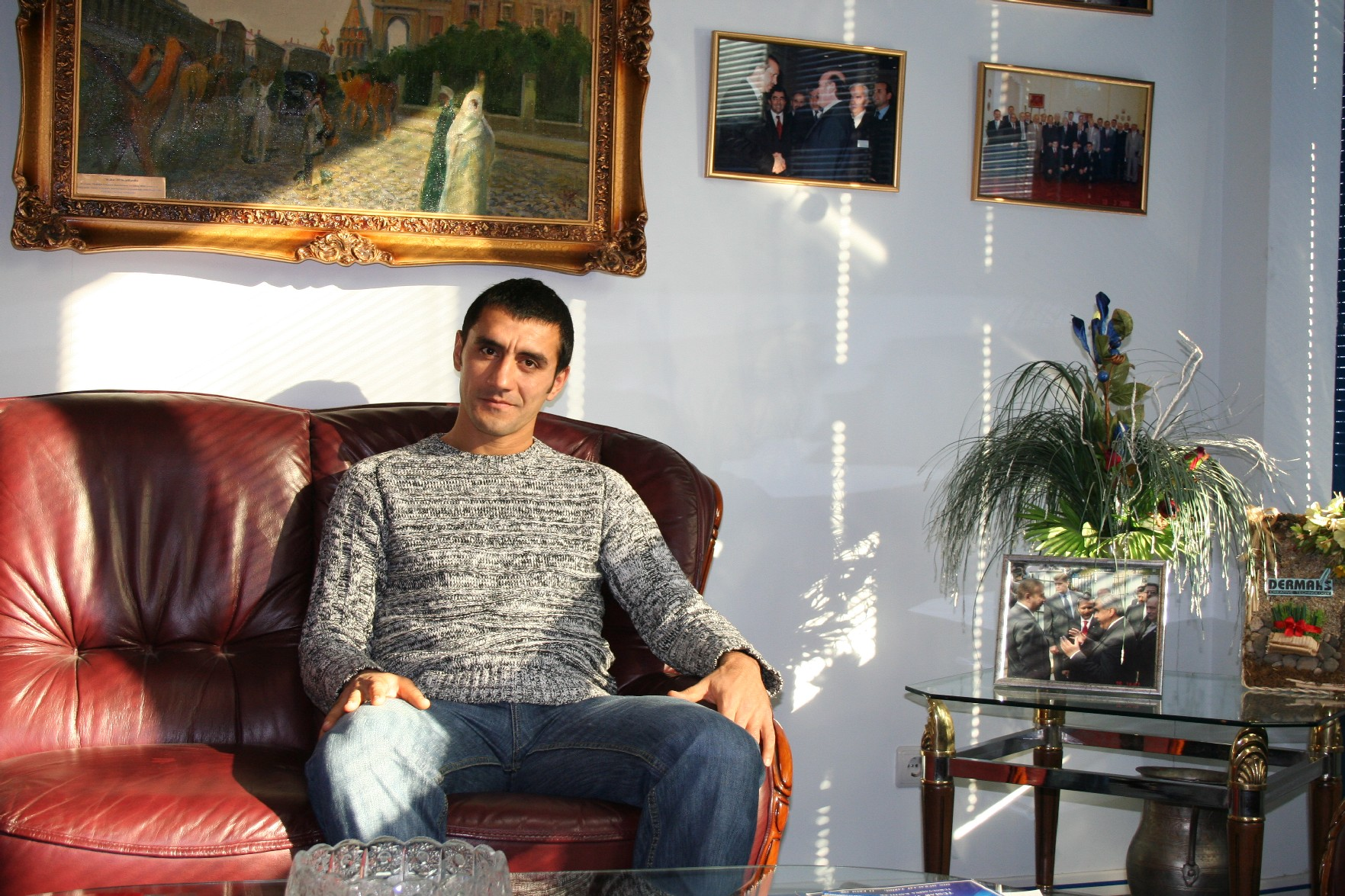
Mammadov during an interview

=== Club ===
==== Neftchi Baku ====
- Azerbaijan Premier League: (1) 1995–96
- Azerbaijan Cup: (2) 1994–95,1995–96

==== Shamkir ====
- Azerbaijan Premier League: (2) 2000–01, 2001–02

Machine Sazi F.C.

=== Individual ===
- Azerbaijan Premier League top goalscorer: 2007–08

Machine sazi FC
