= Şirvan Kürdəmir FK =

Şirvan Kürdəmir
- Full name: Şirvan Kürdəmir Futbol Klubu
- Founded: 1990; 35 years ago
- Dissolved: 1994; 31 years ago
- Ground: Şilyan
- League: Azerbaijan Top Division
- 1992: 25th

Şirvan Kürdəmir FK (Azerbaijani: Şirvan Kürdəmir Futbol Klubu) was an Azerbaijani football club from Şilyan founded in 1990, and dissolved in 1994.

== League and domestic cup history ==
Season	League									Azerbaijan Cup	Top goalscorer	
Season	Div.	Pos.	Pl.	W	D	L	GS	GA	P	Azerbaijan Cup	Name	League
1992	1st	25	26	3	1	22	10	84	7	-	Mübariz Məmmədov	5
1993	2nd	7	16	5	2	9	20	41	12			
1993–94	2nd	7	18	6	3	9	25	38	15			
