= 1997–98 Azerbaijan Top League =

Azerbaijan Top League
- Season: 1997–98
- Champions: Kapaz
- Relegated: Azerbaijan U-18; Qarabağ; Kur Nur; Khazri Buzovna
- Champions League: Kapaz
- UEFA Cup: Dinamo Baku
- Cup Winners' Cup: Qarabağ
- Intertoto Cup: Bakı Fahlasi
- Top goalscorer: Nazim Aliyev (23)

The 1997–98 Azerbaijan Top League was the seventh season of the Azerbaijan Top League, since their independence from the USSR in August 1991, and was contested by 15 clubs. Kapaz won their second title and Qarabağ and the Azerbaijan U-18 team were relegated. Khazri Buzovna pulled out of the league and dissolved after 8 games, as did Kur Nur at the end of the season.

== Teams ==
=== Stadia and locations ===
Location of teams in Azerbaijan Premier League 1997–98

Team	Venue	Capacity
Azerbaijan U-18		
Bakılı Baku	Shafa Stadium (IV field)	8,152
Bakı Fahlasi	Ismat Gayibov Stadium	5,000
Dinamo Baku	Tofik Bakhramov Stadium	29,858
Kapaz	Ganja City Stadium	26,120
Khazri Buzovna		
Khazar Sumgayit		
Kur Nur	Yashar Mammadzade Stadium	5,000
MOIK Baku	Shafa Stadium (IV field)	8,152
Neftchi Baku	Tofik Bakhramov Stadium	29,858
Qarabağ Ağdam	Guzanli Olympic Stadium^{1}	15,000
Qarabağ Bärdä	Barda City Stadium	10,000
Shamkir		
Turan Tovuz	Tovuz City Stadium	10,000
Viləş Masallı	Anatoliy Banishevskiy Stadium	8,000

^{1}Qarabağ played their home matches at Surakhani Stadium in Baku before moving to their current stadium on 3 May 2009.

== League table ==
Pos	Team	Pld	W	D	L	GF	GA	GD	Pts	Qualification or relegation
1	Kapaz (C)	26	22	4	0	67	10	+57	70	Qualification for Champions League first qualifying round
2	Dinamo Baku	26	16	6	4	48	20	+28	54	Qualification for UEFA Cup first qualifying round
3	Shamkir	26	15	9	2	44	10	+34	54	
4	Qarabağ Ağdam	26	14	7	5	43	22	+21	49	Qualification for Cup Winners' Cup qualifying round
5	Bakı Fahlasi	26	14	7	5	45	28	+17	49	Qualification for Intertoto Cup first round
6	Neftchi Baku	26	13	4	9	43	23	+20	43	
7	MOIK Baku	26	12	7	7	39	29	+10	43	
8	Viləş Masallı	26	10	5	11	26	38	−12	35	
9	Turan Tovuz	26	9	4	13	26	45	−19	31	
10	Bakili Baku	26	8	4	14	35	43	−8	28	
11	Kur Nur	26	8	3	15	26	36	−10	27	Team withdrew at the end of the season
12	Khazar Sumgayit	26	4	2	20	15	54	−39	14	
13	Azerbaijan U-18 (R)	26	3	0	23	16	60	−44	9	Relegation to Azerbaijan First Division
14	Qarabağ Bärdä (R)	26	1	2	23	10	65	−55	5	Relegation to Azerbaijan First Division
15	Khazri Buzovna (R)	8	1	0	7	6	25	−19	3	Team withdrew (Note: Khazri Buzovna withdrew after the eighth round of fixtures and dissolved)

Source: Azerbaijan Professional Football league
Rules for classification: 1) points; 2) goal difference; 3) number of goals scored.
(C) Champions; (R) Relegated

== Results ==
Home \ Away	U18	BFA	BKL	DIN	KAP	KHS	KNU	MOI	NEF	QAR	QBÄ	SHA	TUR	MAS
Azerbaijan U-18		2–4	0–2	0–3	0–1	3–0 (Note: Match rated as walkover due to the withdrawal of Khazar Sumgayit.)	0–3	0–4	0–2	0–5	3–0 (Note: Match rated as walkover due to the withdrawal of Qarabağ Bärdä)	1–2	1–2	0–2
Bakı Fahlasi	2–1		4–2	2–2	0–1	1–0	0–0	2–0	1–0	2–4	3–0	0–0	2–0	4–1
Bakılı	3–0	1–2		2–6	0–3	3–0	1–0	2–4	0–3	0–2	3–0	1–1	2–0	5–0
Dinamo Baku	4–0	0–0	0–0		1–1	3–2	5–0	1–2	1–1	3–0	3–0	2–0	2–0	2–1
Kapaz	6–0	4–0	4–1	2–0		4–1	2–0	5–0	2–0	3–2	3–0	0–0	3–0	6–1
Khazar Sumgayit	1–0	0–3 (Note: Walkover.)	0–3	0–3	0–3		0–3	0–3	2–2	0–3	3–0	0–0	2–0	2–0
Kur Nur	2–1	0–1	1–0	0–1	1–3	2–1		0–1	1–4	0–0	3–0	0–1	1–5	3–0
MOIK Baku	2–1	1–1	2–1	0–1	1–1	2–1	0–0		1–0	2–1	3–0	1–1	3–0	1–1
Neftçi Baku	2–0	3–1	4–1	2–0	0–1	3–0	2–0	2–1		1–1	3–1	1–1	3–0	1–2
Qarabağ	1–0	2–2	1–0	0–1	0–0	1–0	3–2	2–1	1–0		3–0	0–0	3–1	3–0
Qarabağ Bärdä	1–2	2–6	1–1	0–1	1–3	– (Note: Match counted as a defeat for both clubs.)	0–3	3–2	0–3	0–0		0–3	0–3	0–3
Şəmkir	3–0	2–0	3–0	4–1	0–1	3–0	2–0	2–1	2–0	3–0	2–0		7–0	1–1
Turan	2–0	0–2	1–1	1–1	0–2	3–0	1–0	1–1	1–0	1–5	2–1	0–0		1–0
Viləş FK	2–1	0–0	1–0	0–1	1–3	3–0	2–1	0–0	2–1	0–0	1–0	0–1	2–1	

Source: APL: Yüksək dəstə - 1997-98
Legend: Blue = home team win; Yellow = draw; Red = away team win.

== Season statistics ==
=== Top scorers ===
Rank	Player	Club	Goals
1	(Azerbaijan) Nazim Aliyev	Dinamo Baku / Khazar Sumgayit	23
2	(Azerbaijan) Badri Kvaratskhelia	Kapaz	20
3	(Azerbaijan) Farrukh Ismayilov	Dinamo	14
3	(Azerbaijan) Vadim Vasilyev	Bakı Fahlasi	14
5	(Azerbaijan) Samir Aliyev	Bakili / MOIK	13
6	(Azerbaijan) Yalçın Bağırov	Qarabağ / Dinamo	10
6	(Azerbaijan) Vüqar Qəmbərov	Bakili	10
6	(Azerbaijan) Mushfig Huseynov	Qarabağ	10
9	(Azerbaijan) Gurban Gurbanov	Neftchi	9
10	(Azerbaijan) Ceyhun Tanrıverdiyev	MOIK / Kapaz	8
