= Qarasu, Kurdamir =

Village in Kurdamir, Azerbaijan

Qarasu is a village in the municipality of Şilyan in the Kurdamir Rayon of Azerbaijan.
