= Vladislav Nosenko =

Azerbaijan footballer (born 1969)

Personal information
- Date of birth: 22 June 1969 (age 57)
- Place of birth: Azerbaijan
- Height: 1.92 m (6 ft 4 in)
- Position: Centre-back

Senior career*
Years	Team	Apps	(Gls)
1990	Chiatura	26	(0)
1991	Baku	17	(0)
1991	Chiatura	18	(1)
1992	Neftçi	27	(0)
1992–1998	Kryvbas Kryvyi Rih	104	(1)
1998–1999	Torpedo Zaporizhzhia	19	(1)
1998–1999	Viktor Zaporizhzhia	2	(0)
1999–2000	Zirka Kirovohrad	12	(0)
1999–2000	Torpedo Zaporizhzhia	10	(1)
1999–2000	Zirka-2 Kirovohrad	3	(0)
2000–2001	Zirka Kirovohrad	13	(0)
2001–2002	Dinaburg	15	(0)
2002–2004	Desna Chernihiv	22	(0)
2002–2004	Zorya Luhansk	1	(0)
2005	Bolat	9	(0)

International career
1995-1997	Azerbaijan	7	(0)
- * Club domestic league appearances and goals

Vladislav Nosenko (Azerbaijani: Vladislav Nosenko; born 22 July 1969) is an Azerbaijani former professional footballer who played as a centre-back.

== Club career ==
Nosenko started his career with Chiatura in 1990 and then he moved to Chiatura. In 1991 he moved to Baku then in Chiatura and in Neftçi. In 1992 he moved to Ukraine on the side of Kryvbas Kryvyi Rih, Torpedo Zaporizhzhia, Viktor Zaporizhzhia and Zirka Kropyvnytskyi. In 1999 he played for Torpedo Zaporizhzhia and Zirka-2 Kirovohrad. In 200 he played for Zirka Kropyvnytskyi and Dinaburg. In 2002 he moved to Desna Chernihiv the main club in the city of Chernihiv where he played 22 matches and scored 1 goal. He also played 1 match for Zorya Luhansk and 9 matches for Bolat.

== International career ==
Nosenko earned seven caps for the Azerbaijan national team between 1995 and 1997.
