= Boz Qurd Samukh FK =

Boz Qurd Samukh
- Full name: Boz Qurd Samukh Futbol Klubu
- Founded: 1990; 35 years ago
- Dissolved: 1993; 32 years ago
- Ground: Samukh
- League: Azerbaijan Top Division
- 1993: 9th Group B

Boz Qurd Samukh FK (Azerbaijani: Boz Qurd Samukh Futbol Klubu) was an Azerbaijani football club from Samukh founded in 1990, as Kür Samux. They finished second in the 1992 Azerbaijan First Division, gaining promotion to the 1993 Azerbaijan Top Division, where they changed their name to Boz Qurd Samukh for their only season, as they finished 9th in Group B, and dissolved at the end of the same season.

== League and domestic cup history ==
Season	League									Azerbaijan Cup	Top goalscorer	
Season	Div.	Pos.	Pl.	W	D	L	GS	GA	P	Azerbaijan Cup	Name	League
1992	2nd	2	18	11	5	2	34	9	27	-		
1993	1st	9th	18	4	6	8	19	30	14	Second round	Həsən Abdullayev	6
