= Çıraqqala Siyəzən FK =

Çıraqqala Siyəzən
- Full name: Çıraqqala Siyəzən Futbol Klubu
- Founded: 1991; 34 years ago
- Dissolved: 1994; 31 years ago
- Ground: Siyəzən
- League: Azerbaijan First Division
- 1993–94: 4th Group B

Çıraqqala Siyəzən FK (Azerbaijani: Çıraqqala Siyəzən Futbol Klubu) was an Azerbaijani football club from Siyəzən founded in 1991. They played in the Azerbaijan Top Division for only one season, 1992, before relegation to the Azerbaijan First Division. They dissolved two years later at the end of the 1993–94 season.

== League and domestic cup history ==
Season	League									Azerbaijan Cup	Top goalscorer	
Season	Div.	Pos.	Pl.	W	D	L	GS	GA	P	Azerbaijan Cup	Name	League
1992	1st	22	38	15	2	21	35	68	34	Quarter-finals	Vahid Sadıqov	12
1993	2nd	6	16	5	2	9	19	21	12	Second round		
1993–94	2nd	4	18	10	1	7	25	19	21	Last 32		
