= Ümid FK =

Ümid
- Full name: Ümid Futbol Klubu
- Founded: 1990; 35 years ago
- Dissolved: 1993; 32 years ago
- Ground: Cəlilabad City Stadium; Cəlilabad
- Capacity: 2750
- League: Azerbaijan Top Division
- 1993: 20th

Ümid FK (Azerbaijani: Ümid Futbol Klubu) was an Azerbaijani football club from Cəlilabad founded in 1990, and dissolved in 1993.

They participated in the Azerbaijan Top Division twice, 1992 and 1993, finishing 11th and then 20th. Sabir Mütəllimov and Xəzər Abbasov were the club's top goalscorers during this period with 7 goals, all of which came in the 1992 season.

== League and domestic cup history ==
Season	League									Azerbaijan Cup	Top goalscorer	
Season	Div.	Pos.	Pl.	W	D	L	GS	GA	P	Azerbaijan Cup	Name	League
1992	1st	11	36	12	5	19	48	78	29	-	Sabir Mütəllimov; Xəzər Abbasov	7
1993	1st	20	18	0	2	16	8	56	2	Last 32	Vüqar Qurbanov	4
