= 1994–95 Azerbaijan Top League =

Azerbaijan Top League
- Season: 1994–95
- Champions: Kəpəz
- Relegated: İnşaatçı Baku; Khazar Sumgayit; Khazar Lankaran
- UEFA Cup: Kəpəz
- Cup Winners' Cup: Neftchi Baku
- Matches played: 156
- Goals scored: 476 (3.05 per match)
- Top goalscorer: Nazim Aliyev (27)

The 1994–95 Azerbaijan Top League was the fourth season of the Azerbaijan Top League and was contested by 13 clubs with 2 points awarded for a win, 1 for a draw and no points were awarded for a defeat. Turan Tovuz were unable to defend their championship, with Kəpəz becoming the champions for the first time.

Khazar Lankaran withdrew from the league after the 12th round, their remaining matches were awarded 3–0 to the opposition. Nicat Maştağa changed their name to Bakı Fahlasi Maştağa.

== Stadia and locations ==
Note: Table lists in alphabetical order.

Team	Location	Venue	Capacity
Kapaz	Ganja	Ganja City Stadium	26,120
İnşaatçı Baku	Baku		
Karabakh Agdam	Quzanlı	Guzanli Olympic Complex Stadium	2,000
Khazri-Eltadzh Buzavna	Buzovna		
Khazar Lankaran	Lankaran		
Khazar Sumgayit	Sumgayit	Mehdi Huseynzade Stadium	15,350
Kur	Mingachevir	Yashar Mammadzade Stadium	5,000
Neftchi Baku	Baku	Tofiq Bahramov Stadium	31,200
Bakı Fahlasi Maştağa	Baku	Ismat Gayibov Stadium	5,000
Pambygchi Barda	Barda	Barda City Stadium	10,000
Pambiqci Neftcala	Neftçala		
Turan Tovuz	Tovuz	Tovuz City Stadium	6,800
FK Masallı	Masallı	Anatoliy Banishevskiy Stadium	7,500

== League table ==
Pos	Team	Pld	W	D	L	GF	GA	GD	Pts	Qualification or relegation
1	Kapaz (C)	24	19	4	1	71	19	+52	42	Qualification for UEFA Cup preliminary round
2	Turan Tovuz	24	19	2	3	48	14	+34	40	
3	Neftchi Baku	24	17	4	3	67	15	+52	38	Qualification for Cup Winners' Cup preliminary round (Note: Neftchi Baku qualified for the qualifying round of the 1995–96 UEFA Cup Winners' Cup as winner of the 1994–95 Azerbaijan Cup.)
4	Karabakh Agdam	24	13	6	5	42	31	+11	32	
5	Kur	24	13	2	9	40	24	+16	28	
6	FK Masallı	24	12	4	8	40	28	+12	28	
7	Khazri Buzovna	24	10	7	7	35	25	+10	27	
8	Bakı Fahlasi Maştağa	24	8	7	9	36	26	+10	23	
9	Pambiqci Neftcala	24	7	5	12	30	52	−22	19	
10	Pambygchi Barda	24	5	2	17	19	53	−34	12	
11	İnşaatçı Baku (R)	24	4	3	17	20	50	−30	11	Relegation to Azerbaijan First Division (Note: Khazar Lankaran withdrew after 12 games – all subsequent matches awarded as 0-3 defeat.)
12	Khazar Sumgayit (R)	24	2	2	20	18	81	−63	6	Relegation to Azerbaijan First Division
13	FK Khazar Lenkoran (R)	24	1	4	19	10	67	−57	6	Relegation to Azerbaijan First Division

Source: Azerbaijan Professional Football league
Rules for classification: 1) points; 2) goal difference; 3) number of goals scored.
(C) Champions; (R) Relegated

== Results ==
Home \ Away	BFM	İNB	KAP	KHA	KHS	KHB	KNU	MAS	NEF	PNE	PBÄ	QAR	TUR
Bakı Fahlasi Maştağa		3–3	1–0	3–0 (Note: Match rated as walkover due to the withdrawal of Khazar Lankaran.)	3–0	2–2	0–0	2–0	0–1	6–0	2–1	0–0	1–2
İnşaatçı Baku	0–5		0–1	3–0	2–1	1–2	0–2	0–2	0–5	2–0	0–1	1–4	1–3
Kapaz	3–1	3–0 (Note: Walkover.)		5–1	10–1	2–1	6–3	2–0	2–1	5–1	5–1	4–1	2–1
Khazar Lankaran	0–0	1–1	0–3		3–3	2–1	0–3	0–3	0–3	0–3	1–1	0–3	0–3
Khazar Sumgayit	0–2	0–4	0–3	3–0		0–2	0–1	0–3	0–10	3–3	3–0	0–1	0–3
Khazri Buzovna	4–0	0–0	1–1	3–0	5–0		1–0	0–0	0–0	2–1	1–0	1–3	0–4
Kur-Nur	1–0	3–0	2–4	2–0	3–0	1–0		1–0	1–2	7–1	1–0	2–0	1–1
FK Masallı	1–0	4–1	2–2	5–2	3–1	1–1	2–1		3–2	2–1	5–0	0–0	0–1
Neftçi Baku	2–0	3–1	0–0	3–0	4–0	3–0	1–0	4–0		6–2	6–0	3–2	2–1
Pambiqci Neftcala	1–1	1–0	0–2	4–0	2–0	0–3	2–1	0–1	0–0		1–0	2–2	1–0
Pambyqchi Bärdä	0–4	3–0	0–3	3–0	4–2	1–0	0–3	3–0	1–5	1–1		1–2	0–1
Qarabağ	3–0	2–0	0–2	3–0	5–1	0–0	2–0	1–0	0–0	4–2	3–0		0–0
Turan	1–0	3–0	1–0	3–0	5–0	3–2	2–1	1–0	2–1	4–1	1–0	2–1	

Source: APL: Yüksək dəstə – 1994/95
Legend: Blue = home team win; Yellow = draw; Red = away team win.

== Season statistics ==
=== Top scorers ===
Rank	Player	Club	Goals
1	(Azerbaijan) Nazim Aliyev	Neftchi Baku	27
2	(Azerbaijan) Yadigar Suleimanov	Kəpəz	19
3	(Azerbaijan) Vyugar Gambarov	Bakı Fahlasi	16
4	(Azerbaijan) Mushvig Guseinov	Karabakh Agdam	14
5	(Azerbaijan) Rovshan Akhmedov	Kəpəz	12
6	(Azerbaijan) İmamyar Süleymanov	Kəpəz	11
7	(Azerbaijan) Azər İsayev	Khazri Buzovna	10
7	(Azerbaijan) Yunis Huseynov	Neftchi Baku	10
9	(Azerbaijan) Alay Bəhramov	FK Masallı	8
9	(Azerbaijan) Musa Qurbanov	Turan Tovuz	8
