= Energetik Əli-Bayramlı FK =

Energetik Əli-Bayramlı
- Full name: Energetik Əli-Bayramlı Futbol Klubu
- Founded: 1980; 46 years ago
- Ground: Shirvan
- League: Azerbaijan First Division
- 1994–95: 6th

Energetik Əli-Bayramlı FK (Shirvan FK) (Azerbaijani: Energetik Əli-Bayramlı Futbol Klubu) was an Azerbaijani football club from Shirvan founded in 1980. They played in the Azerbaijan Top Division for only one season, 1992, before relegation to the Azerbaijan First Division. They dissolved three years later at the end of the 1994–95 season. The club resumed its activities in 2023.

== League and domestic cup history ==
Season	League									Azerbaijan Cup	Top goalscorer	
Season	Div.	Pos.	Pl.	W	D	L	GS	GA	P	Azerbaijan Cup	Name	League
1992	1st	22	38	7	3	28	28	91	17	-	Zahir İbişov	5
1993	2nd	4	14	5	3	6	20	22	13	Second round		
1993–94	2nd	6	18	8	2	8	34	30	18	Last 32		
1994–95	2nd	6	28	14	4	10	38	36	32	Last 16		

== 2024/25 season ==
In the 2024/25 season, Shirvan FK competed in Group E of the Central Zone of the AFFA Regional League. The team made a successful start to the season, winning their opening match against Mil FK by a score of 4–0.

As a result of their consistent performances throughout the season, Shirvan FK achieved strong results in Group E and qualified for the final stage. In the final stage, Shirvan FK faced Khankendi FK and were defeated 3–0 in that match.

Following this performance, Shirvan FK took part in a playoff match for promotion to the Azerbaijan II League. On 29 May 2025, at ASCO Arena in Baku, Shirvan FK played against Lerik PFK. The match ended 2–2 in regular time, and in extra time Shirvan FK scored an additional goal to win the match

With this result, Shirvan FK earned the right to compete in the Azerbaijan II League starting from the 2025/26 season. The defeated Lerik PFK will compete in the AFFA Regional League in the following season.
