= Kürmük Qakh FK =

Kürmük Qakh
- Full name: Kürmük Qakh Futbol Klubu
- Founded: 1990; 35 years ago
- Dissolved: 1995; 30 years ago
- Ground: Qakh
- League: Azerbaijan Top Division
- 1993–94: 15th

Kürmük Qakh FK (Azerbaijani: Kürmük Qax Futbol Klubu) was an Azerbaijani football club from Qakh that played in the Azerbaijan Top Division and Azerbaijan First Division.

== History ==
The club was founded in 1990, and dissolved at the end of the 1994–95 Azerbaijan First Division season. They competed in the Azerbaijan Top Division three times before their relegation at the end of the 1993–94 season.

== League and domestic cup history ==
Season	League									Azerbaijan Cup	Top goalscorer	
Season	Div.	Pos.	Pl.	W	D	L	GS	GA	P	Azerbaijan Cup	Name	League
1992	1st	10	36	12	7	17	57	82	31	First round	Əlövsət Bayramov	15
1993	1st	13	18	6	5	7	25	26	17	Last 16	Telman Kərimov	7
1993–94	1st	15	30	5	3	22	18	84	13	-	Elbrus Əliyev	6
1994–95	2nd	3	28	21	1	6	50	12	43	Last 32		
