= FK Daşqın Zaqatala =

Daşqın Zaqatala
- Full name: Daşqın Zaqatala Futbol Klubu
- Founded: 1968; 57 years ago (reformed 1994; 31 years ago)
- Dissolved: 1993; 32 years ago 1995; 30 years ago
- Ground: Zaqatala
- League: Azerbaijan Top Division
- 1993: 6th

FK Daşqın Zaqatala (Azerbaijani: Daşqın Zaqatala Futbol Klubu) was an Azerbaijani football club from Zaqatala founded in 1968, and dissolved in 1993.

They participated in the Azerbaijan Top Division twice, 1992 and 1993, finishing 17th and then 6th. Gurban Gurbanov was the club's top goalscorer during this period with 24 goals, but the club folded at the end of the '93 season due to financial difficulties. Daşqın Zaqatala was reformed a year later and took part in the 1994–95 Azerbaijan First Division, however the club again ceased to operate at the end of that season.

== League and domestic cup history ==
Season	League									Azerbaijan Cup	Top goalscorer	
Season	Div.	Pos.	Pl.	W	D	L	GS	GA	P	Azerbaijan Cup	Name	League
1992	1st	16	38	19	3	16	48	52	41	-	Gurban Gurbanov	13
1993	1st	6	18	9	3	6	30	22	21	Last 32	Gurban Gurbanov	11
1994–95	2nd	10	28	12	5	11	34	34	29	Last 16		
