= Vadim Vasilyev (footballer) =

Azerbaijani footballer (born 1972)

Personal information
- Full name: Vadim Viktorovich Vasilyev
- Date of birth: 17 May 1972 (age 54)
- Place of birth: Baku, Soviet Union
- Height: 1.80 m (5 ft 11 in)
- Position: Striker

Senior career*
Years	Team	Apps	(Gls)
1993–1994	Khazri Eltaj	12	(0)
1994	Nicat Maştağa	11	(3)
1995	Metalurh Donetsk	36	(14)
1996–1999	Baku Fahlasi	81	(46)
1999–2002	Neftchi Baku	59	(15)
2003	Tavriya Simferopol	3	(0)
2003–2004	Neftchi Baku	19	(17)
2004–2005	Qarabağ	28	(12)
2005–2006	Baku	22	(7)
2006–2007	Olimpik Baku	9	(0)
2007	Karvan	10	(2)
Total		297	(116)

International career
1999–2003	Azerbaijan	35	(2)
- * Club domestic league appearances and goals

Vadim Vasilyev (Azerbaijani: Vadim Vasilyev, Russian: Вадим Васильев; born 17 May 1972) is a retired Azerbaijani professional footballer who made his professional debut in 1993 for Khazri Eltaj.

== International career ==
Vasilyev made his debut for Azerbaijan on 6 March 1999 against Estonia, coming on as a substitute for Gurban Gurbanov.

== Career statistics ==
=== International ===
Azerbaijan national team
Year	Apps	Goals
1999	8	0
2000	7	0
2001	8	2
2002	5	0
2003	5	0
Total	33	2

Statistics accurate as of 2 November 2015

=== International goals ===
#	Date	Venue	Opponent	Score	Result	Competition
1.	28 March 2001	Štadión Antona Malatinského Trnava	Slovakia	1-1	3–1	2002 WC qualification
2.	6 June 2001	Tofiq Bahramov Stadium, Baku	Slovakia	1–0	2–0	2002 WC qualification

== Honours ==
Neftchi Baku

- Azerbaijan Top League (1): 2003–04
- Azerbaijan Cup (2): 2001–02, 2003–04

FC Baku

- Azerbaijan Top League (1): 2005–06
