= 2003–04 Azerbaijan Top League =

Azerbaijan Top League
- Season: 2003–04
- Champions: Neftchi Baku; 2nd Azerbaijani title
- Champions League: Neftchi Baku
- UEFA Cup: Shamkir; Karabakh
- Matches: 182
- Goals: 531 (2.92 per match)
- Top goalscorer: Samir Musayev (20)

The 2003–04 Azerbaijan Top League was contested by fourteen clubs. It started on 17 May 2003 and finished on 5 May 2004. The title was won by Neftchi Baku for the fourth time.

== League table ==
Pos	Team	Pld	W	D	L	GF	GA	GD	Pts	Qualification or relegation
1	Neftçi Baku (C)	26	22	3	1	66	15	+51	69	Qualification for Champions League first qualifying round
2	Şəmkir	26	20	4	2	67	11	+56	64	Qualification for UEFA Cup first qualifying round
3	Qarabağ	26	19	3	4	63	17	+46	60	Qualification for UEFA Cup first qualifying round
4	Khazar Universiteti Baku	26	15	6	5	43	16	+27	51	Qualification for Intertoto Cup first round
5	Dinamo Baku	26	12	5	9	45	32	+13	41	
6	Shafa Baku	26	12	3	11	40	23	+17	39	
7	Bakili Baku	26	10	4	12	40	46	−6	34	
8	MOIK Baku	26	7	8	11	25	32	−7	29	
9	Adliyya Baku	26	7	8	11	27	40	−13	29	
10	Şahdağ	26	7	6	13	29	41	−12	27	
11	Kapaz	26	6	5	15	22	45	−23	23	
12	Xəzər Sumqayıt (R)	26	7	1	18	32	78	−46	22	Team Dissolved
13	Turan	26	4	4	18	15	59	−44	16	
14	Lokomotiv Imisli (R)	26	4	0	22	17	76	−59	12	Team Dissolved

Source: Azerbaijan Professional Football league
Rules for classification: 1) points; 2) goal difference; 3) number of goals scored.
(C) Champions; (R) Relegated
- Umid Baku removed from the league on July 21

== Results ==
Home \ Away	ADL	BAK	BKL	KAP	KHU	LOK	MOI	NEF	QAR	SHB	ŞAH	SHA	TUR	KHS
Adliyya Baku		0–0	1–1	2–0	0–1	2–3	1–1	0–3	1–1	1–4	1–0	0–2	3–0	0–1
Dinamo Baku	3–0		2–0	0–0	4–0	3–0 (Note: Match rated as walkover due to the withdrawal of Lokomotiv Imisli.)	2–0	2–5	1–2	1–2	4–0	0–2	0–1	5–1
Bakili Baku	0–0	3–3		4–2	0–1	3–0	2–0	0–2	0–0	0–3	0–4	0–2	5–0	8–2
Kapaz	0–0	1–4	2–4		0–1	1–3	0–0	1–2	0–1	1–0	0–0	0–3 (Note: Walkover.)	3–0	2–0
Khazar Universiteti Baku	0–1	3–0	3–0	8–0		5–0	0–0	0–0	0–2	0–0	2–0	0–0	2–0	2–0
Lokomotiv Imisli	0–3	2–3	0–3	0–3	0–3		2–3	0–2	0–2	0–5	0–3	0–3	3–1	0–3
MOIK Baku	1–0	1–1	0–1	0–1	1–2	3–0		0–1	0–3	0–0	1–2	1–0	1–1	2–1
Neftçi Baku	3–1	1–0	6–0	3–0	2–1	3–0	0–0		2–0	1–0	4–2	2–2	6–1	7–0
Qarabağ	7–0	0–1	4–0	4–0	3–1	3–0	3–1	1–3		2–0	5–0	2–0	4–0	5–2
Shafa Baku	7–1	1–3	1–2	1–0	0–1	3–0	3–0	0–1	0–1		1–0	0–1	2–0	4–1
Şahdağ	1–1	1–1	2–1	1–1	0–0	1–2	2–2	0–1	1–2	2–0		0–3	2–0	4–0
Şəmkir	0–0	4–0	3–0	2–0	1–1	5–1	3–0	3–1	3–0	3–1	5–0		5–1	3–1
Turan	0–2	0–2	2–3	2–1	0–3	3–0	1–2	0–2	0–0	1–1	1–0	0–2		0–0
Xəzər Sumqayıt	1–6	2–0	1–0	0–3	2–3	4–1	0–5	1–3	1–6	0–1	3–1	0–7	5–0	

Source: APL: Yüksək dəstə - 2003-04
Legend: Blue = home team win; Yellow = draw; Red = away team win.

== Season statistics ==
=== Top scorers ===
Rank	Player	Club	Goals
1	(Azerbaijan) Samir Musayev	Karabakh	20
2	(Azerbaijan) Vadim Vasilyev	Neftchi Baku	16
3	(Azerbaijan) Kanan Karimov	Shamkir	15
4	(Azerbaijan) Sanan Qurbanov	Shafa Baku	12
4	(Azerbaijan) Zaur Ramazanov	MOIK Baku	12
