= Şilyan, Kurdamir =

Şilyan
- Municipality
- Location within Azerbaijan
- Coordinates: 40°19′45″N 48°00′51″E
- Country: Azerbaijan
- District: Kurdamir
- Time zone: UTC+4 (AZT)

Şilyan (Shilyan) is a village and municipality in the Kurdamir District of Azerbaijan. The municipality consists of the villages of Şilyan and Qarasu.
