= Plastik Salyan FK =

Plastik Salyan
- Full name: Plastik Salyan Futbol Klubu
- Founded: 1971; 54 years ago
- Dissolved: 1997; 28 years ago
- Ground: Salyan
- League: Azerbaijan First Division
- 1996–97: 7th Group B

Plastik Salyan FK (Azerbaijani: Plastik Salyan Futbol Klubu) was an Azerbaijani football club from Salyan founded in 1971, as Himik Salyan. They changed their name to Plastik Salyan in 1990 before disbanding in 1997.

== League and domestic cup history ==
| Season | League | | | | | | | | | Azerbaijan Cup | Top goalscorer | |
| Season | Div. | Pos. | Pl. | W | D | L | GS | GA | P | Azerbaijan Cup | Name | League |
|---|---|---|---|---|---|---|---|---|---|---|---|---|
| 1992 | 1st | 19 | 38 | 18 | 2 | 18 | 44 | 60 | 38 | - | Əli Abışov | 12 |
| 1993 | 2nd | 3 | 14 | 8 | 1 | 5 | 23 | 21 | 17 | Last 16 | | |
| 1993–94 | 2nd | 4 | 18 | 8 | 7 | 3 | 34 | 19 | 23 | Last 32 | | |
| 1994–95 | 2nd | 8 | 28 | 13 | 4 | 11 | 36 | 41 | 30 | Last 32 | | |
| 1995–96 | 2nd | 10 | 28 | 7 | 3 | 18 | 27 | 20 | 24 | Last 16 | | |
| 1996–97 | 2nd | 10 | 16 | 5 | 3 | 8 | 18 | 23 | 18 | Last 32 | | |
