= 1993–94 Azerbaijan Top League =

Azerbaijan Top League
- Season: 1993–94
- Champions: Turan Tovuz
- Relegated: Nefteqaz; Azeri Baku; Kürmük Qakh; Avtomobilçi Yevlax
- UEFA Cup: Turan Tovuz
- Matches played: 450
- Goals scored: 620 (1.38 per match)
- Top goalscorer: Musa Qurbanov (35)

The 1993–94 Azerbaijan Top League was the third season of the Azerbaijan Top League and was contested by 16 clubs with 2 points awarded for a win, 1 for a draw and no points were awarded for a defeat. Karabakh Agdam were unable to defend their championship, with Turan Tovuz becoming the champions.

Kur changed their name to Kur-Nur, whilst newly promoted Khazri Buzovna became Khazri-Eltadzh Buzavna.

== Stadia and locations ==
Location of teams in 2012–13 Azerbaijan Premier League

Note: Table lists in alphabetical order.

Team	Location	Venue	Capacity
Avtomobilçi Yevlax	Yevlakh		
Azeri Baku	Baku		
İnşaatçı Baku	Baku		
Qarabağ	Quzanlı	Guzanli Olympic Complex Stadium	2,000
Kapaz	Ganja	Ganja City Stadium	26,120
Khazri Buzovna	Buzovna		
Khazar Lankaran	Lankaran		
Khazar Sumgayit	Sumgayit	Mehdi Huseynzade Stadium	15,350
Kur-Nur	Mingachevir	Yashar Mammadzade Stadium	5,000
Kürmük Qakh	Qakh		
FK Masallı	Masallı	Anatoliy Banishevskiy Stadium	7,500
Neftchi Baku	Baku	Tofiq Bahramov Stadium	31,200
Nefteqaz	Qusar	Shovkat Ordukhanov Stadium	5,000
Nicat Maştağa	Baku	Ismat Gayibov Stadium	5,000
Pambygchi Barda	Barda	Barda City Stadium	10,000
Turan Tovuz	Tovuz	Tovuz City Stadium	6,800

== League table ==
Pos	Team	Pld	W	D	L	GF	GA	GD	Pts	Qualification or relegation
1	Turan Tovuz (C)	30	23	4	3	74	18	+56	50	Qualification for UEFA Cup preliminary round
2	Karabakh Agdam	30	21	7	2	52	12	+40	49	
3	Kapaz	30	20	7	3	74	47	+27	47	
4	Khazar Sumgayit	30	13	9	8	44	28	+16	35	
5	Kur-Nur	30	13	7	10	36	33	+3	33	
6	FK Masallı	30	15	2	13	28	28	0	32	
7	Nicat Maştağa	30	11	9	10	32	29	+3	31	
8	Neftchi Baku	30	11	7	12	37	11	+26	29	
9	Khazar Lenkoran	30	10	9	11	44	33	+11	29	
10	İnşaatçı Baku	30	9	10	11	25	28	−3	28	
11	Pambygchi Barda	30	11	5	14	40	27	+13	27	
12	Khazri Buzovna	30	10	7	13	35	34	+1	27	
13	Nefteqaz (R)	30	11	2	17	40	62	−22	24	Relegation to Azerbaijan First Division
14	Azeri Baku (R)	30	7	7	16	28	53	−25	21	Relegation to Azerbaijan First Division
15	Kürmük Qakh (R)	30	5	3	22	18	84	−66	13	Relegation to Azerbaijan First Division
16	Avtomobilçi Yevlax (R)	30	2	1	27	13	90	−77	5	Relegation to Azerbaijan First Division

Source: Azerbaijan Professional Football league
Rules for classification: 1) points; 2) goal difference; 3) number of goals scored.
(C) Champions; (R) Relegated

== Results ==
Home \ Away	AVT	AZB	İNB	KAP	KHB	KHA	KHS	KNU	KQU	MAS	NEF	NEQ	NMS	PBÄ	QAR	TUR
Avtomobilçi Yevlax		– (Note: The match was rated with 2–0 points.)	0–0	0–4	–	3–8	0–4	2–3	3–2	–	–	1–4	0–3	1–3	0–5	0–3
Azeri Baku	5–1		2–1	1–1	2–1	1–1	1–1	1–1	3–1	2–1	–	2–4	0–1	0–0	0–1	1–3
İnşaatçı Baku	–	0–0		1–2	0–0	1–0	0–0	0–0	3–0	–	–	1–0	0–0	1–0	0–0	1–3
Kapaz	8–0	3–0	5–1		2–0	4–1	1–0	4–3	4–0	–	–	4–1	6–0	5–1	4–1	1–3
Khazri Buzovna	1–0	2–0	0–0	1–1		3–1	2–3	1–0	2–1	3–0	2–2	6–0	1–0	3–0	0–0	0–0
Khazar Lankaran	7–0	1–0	1–0	1–1	5–1		2–2	1–2	3–0	3–0	–	3–1	0–0	1–0	1–1	0–0
Khazar Sumgayit	6–1	3–1	1–0	1–1	3–1	2–2		3–0	3–0	0–1	0–0	3–1	1–0	2–1	0–1	1–0
Kur-Nur	–	5–0	3–4	–	2–2	1–0	–		5–1	1–0	–	3–0	2–0	0–0	0–0	1–1
Kürmük Qakh	–	1–1	0–1	1–3	2–1	1–1	–	0–1		0–1	0–0	2–3	2–1	1–0	0–3	0–5
FK Masallı	3–0	2–0	–	0–0	1–0	1–0	2–0	1–0	6–1		1–0	3–0	2–1	2–1	0–0	0–1
Neftçi Baku	4–0	2–0	2–0	0–1	1–0	1–0	1–1	2–0	7–0	2–0		3–0	1–1	6–1	1–1	1–0
Nefteqaz	4–1	4–2	1–1	1–2	2–1	1–1	0–2	2–1	5–1	2–1	–		1–2	–	2–3	1–3
Nicat Maştağa	–	1–0	2–1	2–2	1–0	3–0	1–1	1–1	5–0	2–0	0–0	3–0		1–1	0–1	1–1
Pambygchi Barda	4–0	2–1	0–0	1–3	2–1	1–0	0–0	1–0	4–1	2–0	–	3–0	1–0		0–4	3–4
Qarabağ	5–0	4–1	2–0	1–1	2–0	–	3–0	2–0	–	5–0	1–0	2–0	3–0	–		1–0
Turan	4–0	5–1	4–2	3–1	1–0	2–0	2–0	4–1	10–0	2–0	2–1	2–0	1–0	3–0	2–0	

Source: APL: Yüksək dəstə – 1993/94
Legend: Blue = home team win; Yellow = draw; Red = away team win.

== Season statistics ==
=== Top scorers ===
Rank	Player	Club	Goals
1	(Azerbaijan) Musa Qurbanov	Turan Tovuz	35
2	(Azerbaijan) Fazil Parvanov	Kəpəz	29
3	(Azerbaijan) Nazim Aliyev	Khazar Sumgayit	24
4	(Azerbaijan) Mushvig Guseinov	Kəpəz	17
4	(Azerbaijan) Imamyar Suleimanov	Kyapaz Gyandzha	17
6	(Azerbaijan) Alay Bəhramov	FK Masallı	15
6	(Azerbaijan) Nurəli Əsədov	Khazar Lenkoran	15
8	(Azerbaijan) Kamran Əlibabayev	Nefteqaz	13
9	(Azerbaijan) Samir Alakbarov	Neftchi Baku	12
9	(Azerbaijan) Azər İsayev	Khazar Sumgayit / Khazri Buzovna	12
