= FK Pambıqçı Neftçala =

Pambiğci Neftçala
- Full name: Futbol Klubu Pambiqci Neftcala
- Founded: 1992; 34 years ago
- Dissolved: 1997; 29 years ago
- Ground: Neftçala
- League: Azerbaijan Top Division
- 1996–97: 15th

FK Pambıqçı Neftçala (Azerbaijani: Futbol Klubu Pambıqçı Neftçala) was an Azerbaijani football club from Neftçala founded in 1992, and dissolved in 1997.

During their first season as a club they finished third in the Azerbaijan First Division, and followed this up the following season with a second place, missing out on promotion after losing to Polad Sumqayıt in the play-offs. The next season, 1993–94, they again finished second and achieved promotion to the Azerbaijan Top Division. Pambiqci Neftcala spent three seasons in the Top Division, finishing 9th, 11th and final 15th in the 1996–97 season, which they folded after the completion.

== League and domestic cup history ==
Season	League									Azerbaijan Cup	Top goalscorer	
Season	Div.	Pos.	Pl.	W	D	L	GS	GA	P	Azerbaijan Cup	Name	League
1992	2nd	3	18	10	4	4	44	23	24	Quarter-finals		
1993	2nd	2	16	10	3	3	36	12	23	Last 16		
1993–94	2nd	2	18	12	1	5	38	19	25	Last 32		
1994–95	1st	9	24	7	5	12	30	52	19	Last 16	Mehman İbrahimov	8
1995–96	1st	11	36	6	3	27	34	97	21	Last 16	Mehman İbrahimov	13
1996–97	1st	15	30	5	6	19	27	68	21	Last 16	Mehman İbrahimov	10
