= Şirvan Şamaxı FK =

Şirvan Şamaxı
- Full name: Şirvan Şamaxı Futbol Klubu
- Founded: 1990; 35 years ago
- Dissolved: 1994; 31 years ago
- Ground: Şamaxı
- League: Azerbaijan First Division
- 1993–94: 8th Group B

Şirvan Şamaxı FK (Azerbaijani: Şirvan Şamaxı Futbol Klubu) was an Azerbaijani football club from Şamaxı founded in 1990, as İnşaatçı Şamaxı. They changed their name to Şirvan Şamaxı in 1992 for their only Azerbaijan Top Division season, in which they finished 20th and were relegated to the Azerbaijan First Division, and dissolved two years later at the end of the 1993–94 season.

== League and domestic cup history ==
Season	League									Azerbaijan Cup	Top goalscorer	
Season	Div.	Pos.	Pl.	W	D	L	GS	GA	P	Azerbaijan Cup	Name	League
1992	1st	20	38	16	2	20	42	67	34	-	Rəhim Səfərov	7
1993	2nd	4	14	5	4	7	23	23	14	Last 16		
1993–94	2nd	8	18	4	2	12	18	44	10	Last 32		
