= Avtomobilçi Yevlax FK =

Avtomobilçi Yevlax
- Full name: Avtomobilçi Yevlax Futbol Klubu
- Founded: 1990; 35 years ago
- Dissolved: 1995; 30 years ago
- Ground: Yevlakh
- League: Azerbaijan First Division
- 1994–95: 9th

Avtomobilçi Yevlax FK (Azerbaijani: Avtomobilçi Yevlax Futbol Klubu) was an Azerbaijani football club from Yevlakh founded in 1990. They played in the Azerbaijan Top Division for only one season, 1992, before relegation to the Azerbaijan First Division. They dissolved three years later at the end of the 1994–95 season.

== League and domestic cup history ==
| Season | League | | | | | | | | | Azerbaijan Cup | Top goalscorer | |
| Season | Div. | Pos. | Pl. | W | D | L | GS | GA | P | Azerbaijan Cup | Name | League |
|---|---|---|---|---|---|---|---|---|---|---|---|---|
| 1992 | 1st | 21 | 38 | 13 | 8 | 17 | 33 | 58 | 34 | - | Şamil Əhmədov | 9 |
| 1993 | 2nd | 1 | 14 | 10 | 2 | 2 | 36 | 15 | 22 | Quarter-finals | | |
| 1993–94 | 1st | 16 | 30 | 2 | 1 | 27 | 13 | 90 | 5 | Last 32 | Vasif İsgəndərov | 4 |
| 1994–95 | 2nd | 9 | 28 | 13 | 3 | 12 | 35 | 47 | 29 | Last 32 | | |
