= FK Avei Agstafa =

Avei Agstafa
- Full name: Avei Agstafa Futbol Klubu
- Founded: 1990; 35 years ago
- Dissolved: 1993; 32 years ago
- Ground: Ağstafa
- League: Azerbaijan Top Division
- 1993: 17th

FK Avei Agstafa (Azerbaijani: Avei Agstafa Futbol Klubu) was an Azerbaijani football club from Ağstafa founded in 1990, and dissolved in 1993.

They participated in the Azerbaijan Top Division twice, finishing 13th and then 17th. Məqsəd Yaqubəliyev and Vüqar Qurbanov were the club's top goalscorers on 10 goals.

== League and domestic cup history ==
Season	League									Azerbaijan Cup	Top goalscorer	
Season	Div.	Pos.	Pl.	W	D	L	GS	GA	P	Azerbaijan Cup	Name	League
1992	1st	13	38	20	2	16	49	54	42	-	Məqsəd Yaqubəliyev	10
1993	1st	17	18	3	5	10	11	26	11	1/8 final	Anar Mehdiyev; Şakir Məmmədov	3
1993–94	2nd	8	18	4	2	12	26	49	10	1/32 final		
