= Siyazan =

Siyazan Siya ji(Tat)
- City & Municipality
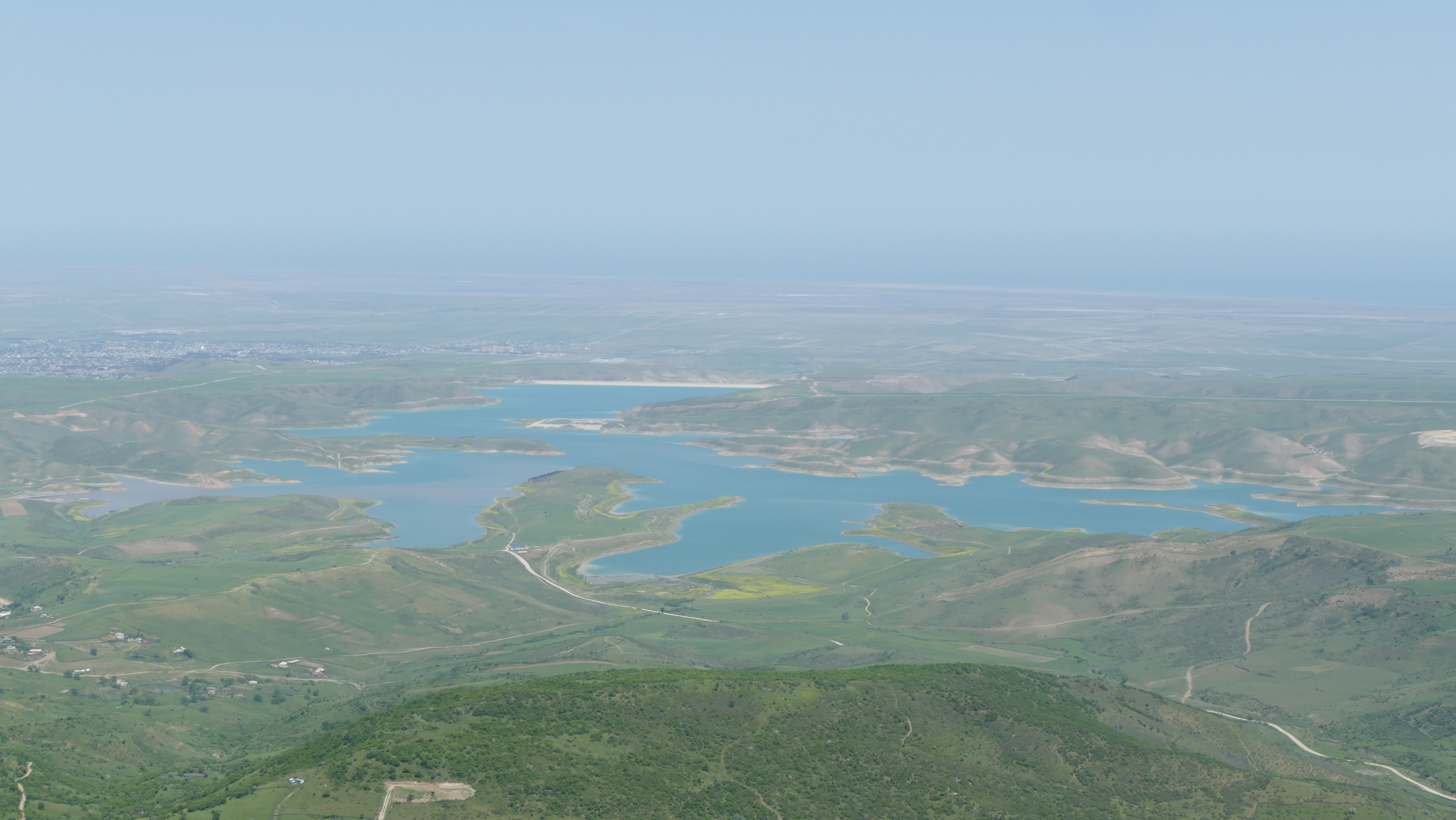

- Location within Azerbaijan
- Coordinates: 41°04′34″N 49°06′50″E
- Country: Azerbaijan
- District: Siyazan
- Founded: 1954

Area
  - Total: 759 km^{2} (293 sq mi)
- Elevation: 55 m (180 ft)

Population (2021)
  - Total: 40,000
  - Density: 53/km^{2} (140/sq mi)
- Time zone: UTC+4 (AZT)
- Postal code: AZ5300
- Area code: +994 0190
- Vehicle registration: 53

Siyazan (Azerbaijani: Siyəzən; Tat: Siya ji) is a city, municipality, and the capital of the Siyazan District of Azerbaijan. It has a population of 24,900. The city's name is said to be derived from Persian or from the Tat language meaning "White Women," a reference to the original population Tats. Another explanation links the name with the Persian word siyah, meaning "black".

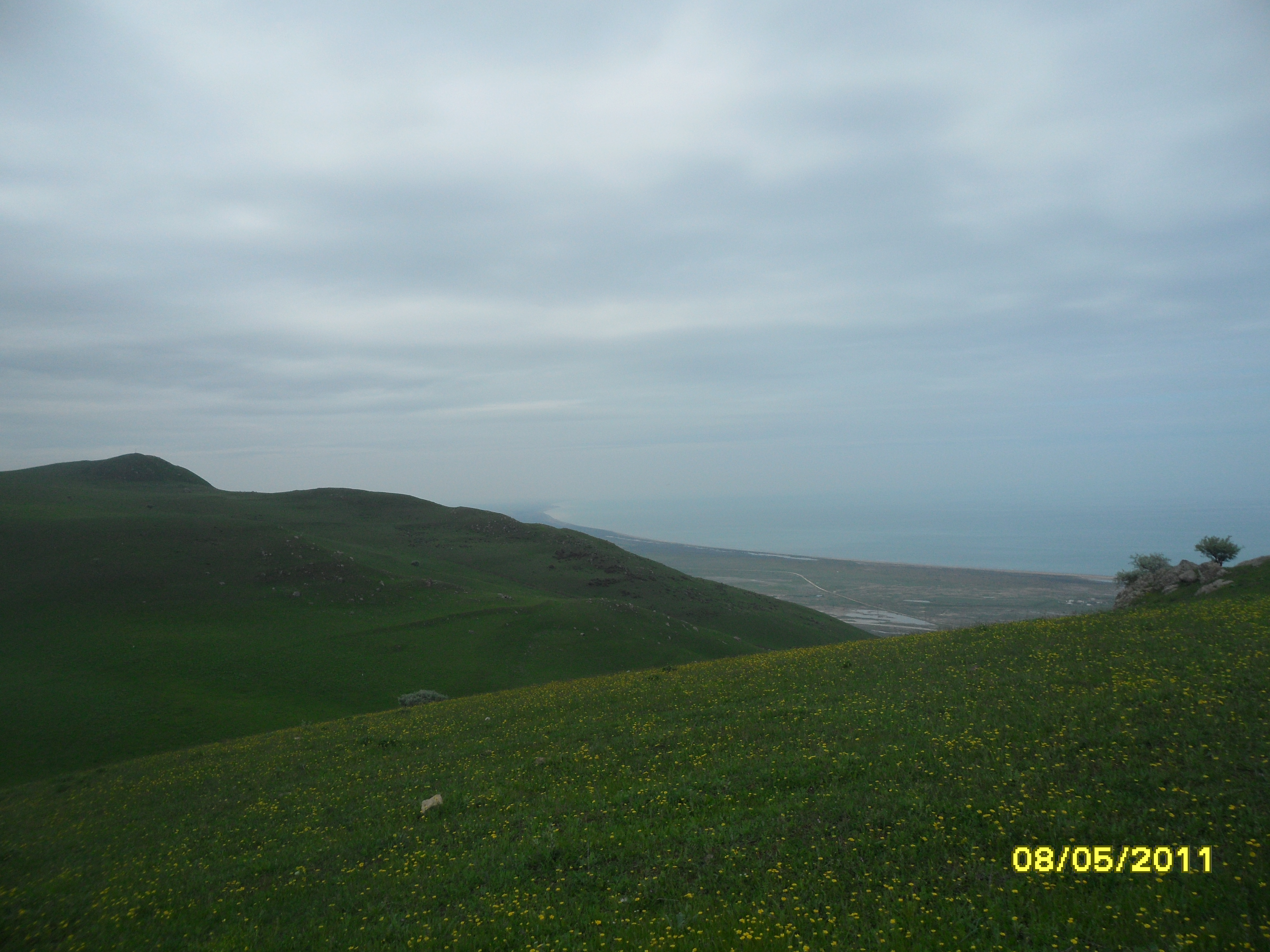
View of Caspian Sea from Siyazan, Azerbaijan

== Bibliography ==
- Everett-Heath, John (2018). "Siyäzän". The Concise Dictionary of World Place-Names (4 ed.). Oxford University Press. ISBN 978-0191866326.
