= Cəlilabad =

Jalilabad
- City & Municipality

- Location within Azerbaijan
- Coordinates: 39°12′32″N 48°29′50″E
- Country: Azerbaijan
- District: Jalilabad
- Elevation: 31 m (102 ft)

Population (2010)
  - Total: 56,400
- Time zone: UTC+4 (AZT)

Jalilabad (Azerbaijani: Cəlilabad), also known as Astrakhanka, and Astrakhan-Bazar until 1967, is a city in and the capital of the Jalilabad District of Azerbaijan. The city is named after the Azerbaijani satirist and writer Jalil Mammadguluzadeh (1869-1932).

== Gallery ==
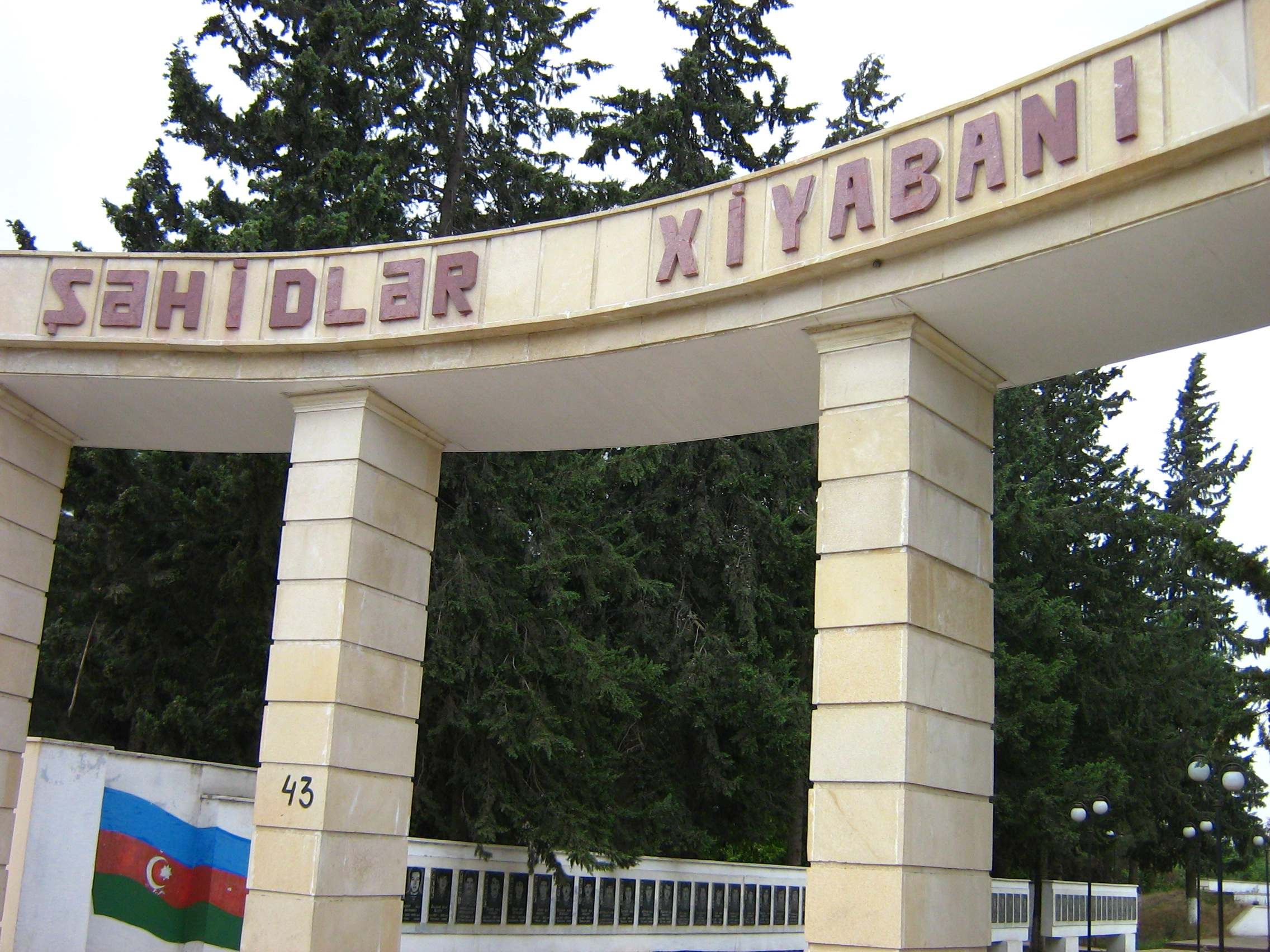
Shahids Square, Cəlilabad

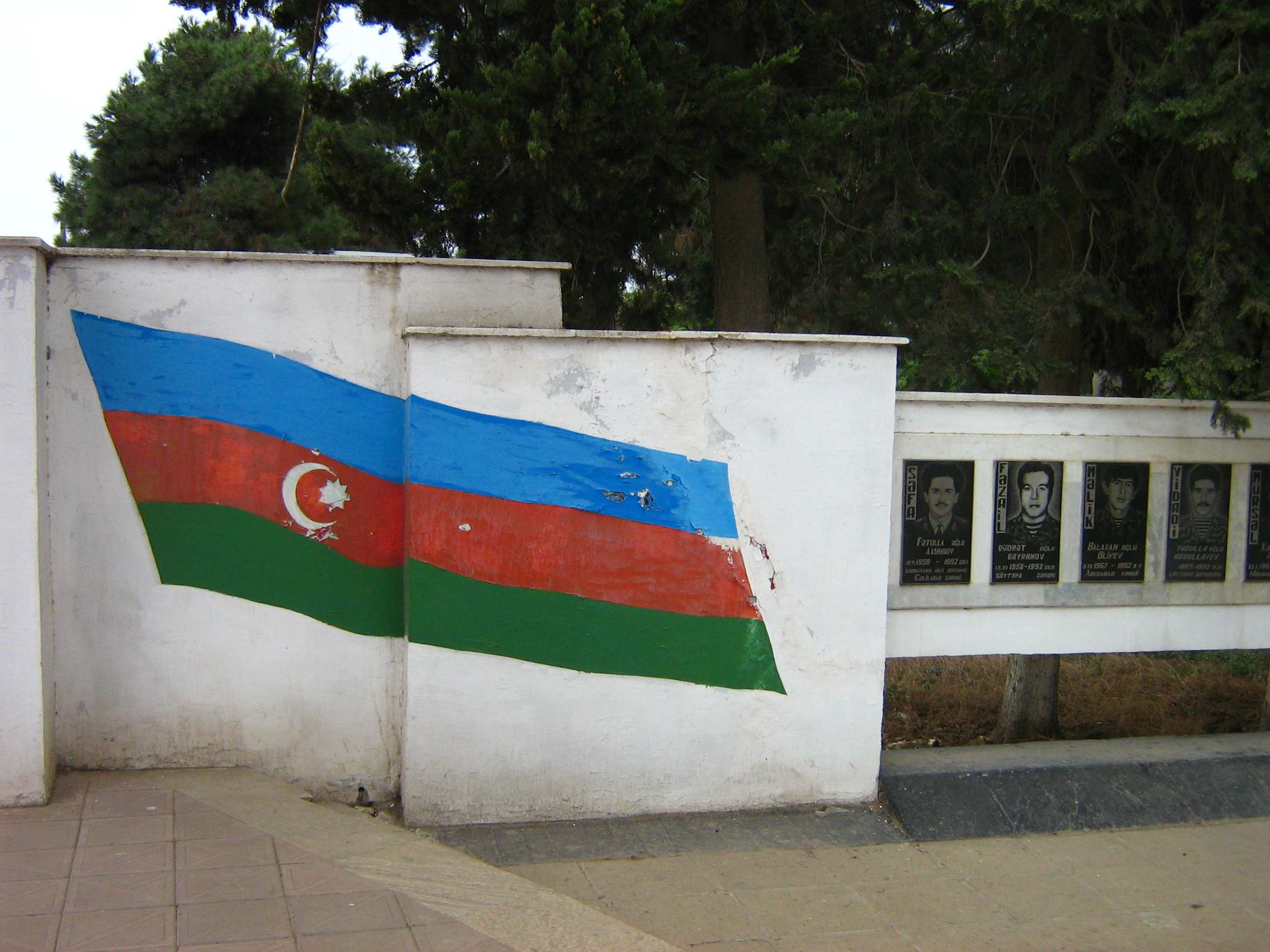
Inside The Shahids Square, Cəlilabad
