= İnşaatçı Baku FK =

İnşaatçı Baku
- Full name: İnşaatçı Baku Futbol Klubu
- Founded: 1935; 90 years ago
- Dissolved: 1995; 30 years ago
- Ground: Baku
- League: Azerbaijan Top Division
- 1994/95: 11th

İnşaatçı Baku FK (Azerbaijani: İnşaatçı Baku Futbol Klubu) was an Azerbaijani football club from Baku founded in 1935, as Stroitel Baku, changing their name to İnşaatçı Baku in 1992 before dissolving in 1995.

They participated in the Azerbaijan Top Division from 1992 to the 1994–95 season. They were also the first winners of the Azerbaijan Cup in 1992.

== Honours ==
- Azerbaijan Cup

Winners (1): 1992

== League and domestic cup history ==
Season	League									Azerbaijan Cup	Top goalscorer	
Season	Div.	Pos.	Pl.	W	D	L	GS	GA	P	Azerbaijan Cup	Name	League
1992	1st	6	36	21	6	9	52	28	48	Winners	Mübariz İsmayılov	12
1993	1st	10	18	7	4	7	28	22	18	Semi-final	Fikrət Hüseynov	8
1993–94	1st	10	30	9	10	11	25	28	37	Quarter-finals	Natiq Məmmədkərimov	3
1994–95	1st	11	24	4	3	17	20	50	15	Quarter-finals	Zaur Həsənzadə	4

== See also ==
- Stroitel Baku
