= Azneftyağ Baku FK =

Azneftyağ Baku
- Full name: Azneftyağ Baku Futbol Klubu
- Founded: 1991; 34 years ago
- Dissolved: 1994; 31 years ago
- Ground: Baku
- League: Azerbaijan First Division
- 1993–94: 1st

Azneftyağ Baku FK (Azerbaijani: Azneftyağ Baku Futbol Klubu) was an Azerbaijani football club from Baku founded in 1991, as Taraggi Baku, and dissolved in 1993 as Azneftyag Baku.

They participated in the Azerbaijan Top Division during the 1992 season as Taraggi Baku, finishing 9th, and changed their name to Azneftyag Baku for the 1993 seasons, finishing 19th. They dissolved after the 1993–94 Azerbaijan First Division season in which they won Group B before losing out on promotion in the playoffs.

== League and domestic cup history ==
Season	League									Azerbaijan Cup	Top goalscorer	
Season	Div.	Pos.	Pl.	W	D	L	GS	GA	P	Azerbaijan Cup	Name	League
1992	1st	11	36	13	6	17	39	49	32	Semi-finals	Samir A. Məmmədov & Kamil Bayramov	7
1993	1st	19	18	3	2	13	12	33	8	Second round	Taleh Məmmədov	4
1993–94	2nd	1	18	11	4	3	37	17	26	Last 16		
