= Azeri Baku FK =

Azeri Baku
- Full name: Azeri Baku Futbol Klubu
- Founded: 1991; 34 years ago
- Dissolved: 1994; 31 years ago
- League: Azerbaijan First Division
- 1993–94: 14th

Azeri Baku FK (Azerbaijani: Azeri Baku Futbol Klubu) was an Azerbaijani football club from Baku founded in 1991, and dissolved at the end of the 1993–94 season.

== League and domestic cup history ==
Season	League									Azerbaijan Cup	Top goalscorer	
Season	Div.	Pos.	Pl.	W	D	L	GS	GA	P	Azerbaijan Cup	Name	League
1992	1st	18	38	17	6	15	53	49	40	First round	Cəfər Əliyev	13
1993	1st	4	18	9	1	8	23	28	19	First round	Arif Zərbayılov; Rövşən Məmmədov; İlqar Məmmədov	4
1993–94	1st	14	30	7	7	16	28	53	21	Last 16	Səməd Nəbiyev	6
