= FK Khazar Sumgayit =

Khazar
- Full name: Xəzər Futbol Klubu
- Founded: 1960
- Dissolved: 2004
- League: Azerbaijan First Division
- 2003–04: 12th

FK Khazar Sumgayit (Azerbaijani: Xəzər Futbol Klubu) was an Azerbaijani football club.

== History ==
Founded in 1960, under the name of Metallurq, the club during its history changed their name 9 times and gained twice second place in Azerbaijan Premier League. In 2004, club liquidated due financial problems.

1960 m. – Metallurg 1961 m. – Temp 1963 m. – Himik 1964 m. – Polad 1974 m. – Hazar 1987 m. – Voshod 1988 m. – Hazar 1992 m. – Khazar 1997 m. – FK Sumqayıt 1998 m. – Kimyaçı 2001 m. – Khazar

== League and domestic cup history ==
Season	Div.	Pos.	Pl.	W	D	L	GS	GA	P	Domestic Cup
1992	1st	2	36	27	3	6	100	24	57	Semi-finals
1993	1st	2	18	11	2	5	29	15	24	Last 16
1993–94	1st	4	30	13	9	8	44	28	48	Quarter-finals
1994–95	1st	12	24	2	2	20	18	81	8	Quarter-finals
1995–96	2nd	1	28	21	5	2	61	18	68	-
1996–97	1st	6	30	18	4	8	58	30	58	
1997–98	1st	12	26	4	2	20	15	54	14	
1998–99	1st	12	30	6	3	21	29	79	21	
1999–2000	1st	9	22	7	1	14	23	34	22	
2003–04	1st	12	26	7	1	18	32	78	22	
