= ANS Pivani Bakı FK =

Azerbaijani football club

ANS Pivani Bakı
- Full name: ANS Pivani Bakı Futbol Klubu
- Founded: 1992; 34 years ago
- Dissolved: 2000; 26 years ago
- Ground: Ismat Gayibov Stadium; Baku
- League: Azerbaijan Top Division
- 2000: 5th

ANS Pivani Bakı FK (Azerbaijani: ANS Pivani Bakı Futbol Klubu) was an Azerbaijani football club from Baku that played in the Azerbaijan Top Division.

== History ==
The club was founded in 1992, as Nicat Maştağa and dissolved in 2000 as ANS Pivani Bakı. During their existence they had four name, Nicat Maştağa from 1992 to 1994, then Bakı Fahlasi Maştağa in 1994, Bakı Fahlasi from 1995 to 1999 and then ANS Pivani Bakı in their final season.

They participated in the Azerbaijan Top Division from 1992 to 2000, when they folded due to financial difficulties. Their best finish was 5th, which they achieved three times, 1997–98, 1998–99 and in their final season 1999–2000.

== League and domestic cup history ==
Season	League									Azerbaijan Cup	Top goalscorer	
Season	Div.	Pos.	Pl.	W	D	L	GS	GA	P	Azerbaijan Cup	Name	League
1992	1st	26	38	0	0	38	-	-	0	-	-	-
1993	1st	15	18	7	1	10	23	27	15	Last 32	İlqar Aslanov	4
1993–94	1st	7	30	11	9	10	32	29	42	Quarter-final	Qulammirzə Əsədullayev	10
1994–95	1st	8	24	8	7	9	35	26	31	Last 16	Vüqar Qəmbərov	15
1995–96	1st	7	20	6	3	11	20	35	21	Semi-final	Vüqar Qəmbərov	10
1996–97	1st	9	30	10	7	13	37	41	37	Quarter-final	Vüqar Qəmbərov	11
1997–98	1st	5	26	14	7	5	45	28	49	-	Vadim Vasilyev	14
1998–99	1st	5	26	15	5	6	46	25	50	Last 32	Vadim Vasilyev	19
1999–2000	1st	5	22	10	2	10	24	28	32	Quarter-final	Khagani Mammadov	9

== European record ==
Competition	Matches	W	D	L	GF	GA
UEFA Intertoto Cup	2	1	0	1	1	1
Total	2	1	0	1	1	1

=== Matches ===
Season	Competition	Round	Country	Club	Home	Away	Aggregate
1998	UEFA Intertoto Cup	1R	(Lithuania)	Inkaras Kaunas	1–0	0–1	1–1 (p 4–5)

== Individual records ==
Lists of the players with the most caps and top goalscorers for ANS Pivani Bakı,:

	Name	Years	League
1	(Azerbaijan) Vadim Vasilyev	1994–1999	49 (92)
2	(Azerbaijan) Vüqar Qəmbərov	1993–1997	40 (99)
3	(Azerbaijan) Mahir Əliyev	1995, 1996–2000	21 (77)
4	(Azerbaijan) Qulammirzə Əsədullayev	1993–1995	15 (56)
5	(Azerbaijan) Yashar Abuzerov	1995–2000	12 (78)
6	(Azerbaijan) Taleh Məmmədov	1994–2000	11 (102)
7	(Azerbaijan) Khagani Mammadov	1999–2000	9 (19)
8	(Azerbaijan) Bəxtiyar Hüseynov	1997–1998	8 (18)
8	(Azerbaijan) Məqsəd Yaqubəliyev	1996–2000	8 (108)
9	(Azerbaijan) İlqar Aslanov	1993–1994	7 (56)
9	(Azerbaijan) Cəfər Əliyev	1993–1995	7 (54)
9	(Azerbaijan) Samir A. Məmmədov	1995–1997	7 (33)
