= Guzanli Olympic Complex Stadium =

Coordinates: 40°09′24″N 47°10′13″E

- Interactive map of Guzanli Olympic Complex Stadium
- Location: Quzanlı, Aghdam, Azerbaijan
- Capacity: 2,000
- Surface: Grass

Tenant
- Karabakh Agdam

Guzanli Olympic Complex Stadium is located in Quzanlı, Aghdam, Azerbaijan. It is used by FK Karabakh as home stadium since May 2009 and has a capacity of 2000.

== See also ==
- List of football stadiums in Azerbaijan
