= FK Viləş Masallı =

Azerbaijani football club

Viləş FK
- Full name: Viləş Futbol Klubu
- Nickname(s): Vilas
- Founded: 1967; 58 years ago as Masallı
- Dissolved: 2008; 17 years ago
- Ground: Anatoly Banishevski Stadium, Masally, Azerbaijan
- Capacity: 7,500
- Chairman: Murad Ehmedov
- Manager: Alay Bayramov
- League: AFFA Amateur League
Home colours	Away colours

Viləş FK is an Azerbaijani football club based in Masally. The club currently play in the AFFA Amateur League. Xayal Gahramanov and Deviko Khinjazov are the notable captains.

== History ==
Founded as FK Masallı in 1967, they played in the AFFA Supreme League in 2007–08 after achieving promotion in 2007, but they withdrew from the league and were disestablished at the end of the season having finished in tenth place.

In 2013, the club reformed as FK Viləş Masallı and celebrated a 2–1 win over FC Saaatly in the AFFA Amateur League, in front of a crowd of 1,000. Their home stadium is Anatoly Banishevski Stadium. Home colours are white shirts, red shorts. Away colours are either red shirts and blue shorts, or blue shirts with white arms, blue shorts.

== Stadium ==
The club's home ground is Anatoly Banishevski Stadium, a multi-use stadium in Masally, which has a capacity of 7,500.

== Squads ==
Note: Flags indicate national team as defined under FIFA eligibility rules; some limited exceptions apply. Players may hold more than one non-FIFA nationality.

No.	Pos.	Nation	Player
—	GK	(Azerbaijan) AZE	Anar Niftaliyev

== Masallı in Europe ==
Season	Competition	Round		Club	Score
2000	UEFA Intertoto Cup	1R	(Poland)	Zagłębie Lubin	1-3, 0–4
2001	UEFA Intertoto Cup	1R	(Iceland)	Grindavík	1-2, 0–1
