= 1966 Neftyanik Baku season =

Neftyanik Baku
1966 season
- Stadium: Tofik Bakhramov Stadium
- Soviet Top League: 3rd
- Soviet Cup: 1/16 finals

The Neftyanik Baku 1966 season was Neftyanik Baku's 10th Soviet Top League season.

== Competitions ==
=== Soviet Top League ===
==== Results ====
10 April 1966 1	Neftyanik Baku	0 – 0	Dynamo Mn	Baku
		[ Summary]		Stadium: Lenin Republican Stadium

15 April 1966 2	Neftyanik Baku	0 – 0	Krylya Sovetov	Baku
		[ Summary]		Stadium: Lenin Republican Stadium

21 April 1966 3	Neftyanik Baku	1 – 0	Dynamo M	Baku
		[ Summary]		Stadium: Lenin Republican Stadium

26 April 1966 4	Neftyanik Baku	2 – 0	Shahtyor	Baku
		[ Summary]		Stadium: Lenin Republican Stadium

3 May 1966 5	CSKA	1 – 1	Neftyanik Baku	Moscow
		[ Summary]		Stadium: Dynamo Stadium

8 May 1966 6	SKA O	1 – 1	Neftyanik Baku	Odessa
		[ Summary]		Stadium: ChMP Central Stadium

13 May 1966 7	Neftyanik Baku	4 – 1	SKA R-D	Baku
		[ Summary]		Stadium: Lenin Republican Stadium

19 May 1966 8	Neftyanik Baku	7 – 0	Torpedo Kt	Baku
		[ Summary]		Stadium: Lenin Republican Stadium

25 May 1966 9	Zenit	3 – 1	Neftyanik Baku	Leningrad
		[ Summary]		Stadium: Kirov Stadium

2 June 1966 10	Kairat	1 – 0	Neftyanik Baku	Alma-Ata
		[ Summary]		Stadium: Central Stadium

8 June 1966 11	Pakhtakor	3 – 2	Neftyanik Baku	Tashkent
		[ Summary]		Stadium: Pakhtakor Central Stadium

13 June 1966 12	Neftyanik Baku	1 – 0	Chernomorets	Baku
		[ Summary]		Stadium: Lenin Republican Stadium

19 June 1966 13	Neftyanik Baku	0 – 0	Dynamo K	Baku
		[ Summary]		Stadium: Lenin Republican Stadium

==== Table ====
Pos	Team	Pld	W	D	L	GF	GA	GD	Pts	Qualification or relegation
1	(Ukrainian Soviet Socialist Republic) Dynamo Kyiv (C)	36	23	10	3	66	17	+49	56	Qualification for European Cup first round
2	(Russian Soviet Federative Socialist Republic) SKA Rostov-on-Don	36	20	7	9	54	44	+10	47	
3	(Azerbaijan Soviet Socialist Republic) Neftyanik Baku	36	18	9	9	56	28	+28	45	
4	(Russian Soviet Federative Socialist Republic) Spartak Moscow	36	15	12	9	45	41	+4	42	
5	(Russian Soviet Federative Socialist Republic) CSKA Moscow	36	16	9	11	60	45	+15	41	

Source: rsssf.com
(C) Champions

=== Goal scorers ===
14 goals

- Kazbek Tuaev

12 goals

- Anatoliy Banishevskiy
- Eduard Markarov
