= Rasim =

Rasim (Arabic: راسِم / Rāsim) is a masculine given name of Arabic origin meaning "planner", "architect". Notable people with the name include:

== Given name ==
- Rasim Abushev (born 1963), Azerbaijani footballer
- Rasim Alguliyev (born 1958), Azerbaijani scientist
- Rasim Aliyev (1984–2015), Azerbaijani journalist
- Rasim Babayev (1927–2007), Azerbaijani painter
- Rasim Balayev (1948–2026), Azerbaijani film and stage actor
- Rasim Başak (born 1980), Azerbaijani-Turkish basketballer
- Rasim Bulić (born 2000), German footballer
- Rasim Delić (1949–2010), Bosnian Army general
- Rasim Al-Jumaily (1938–2007), Iraqi comedian and actor
- Rasim Kalakula, Albanian politician
- Rasim Kara (born 1950), Turkish goalkeeper
- Rasim Kerimow (born 1979), Turkmen footballer
- Rasim Khutov (born 1981), Russian footballer
- Rasim Kiçina (1972–1999), Kosovar army commander
- Rasim Ljajić (born 1964), Serbian politician
- Rasim Mövsümov, Azerbaijani sportswriter
- Rasim Musabeyov (born 1951), Azerbaijani politician
- Rasim Mutuk (1897–1973), Turkish engineer and politician
- Rasim Ojagov (1933–2006), Soviet-Azerbaijani film director
- Rasim Öztekin (1959–2021), Turkish actor
- Rasim Ramaldanov (born 1986), Azerbaijani footballer
- Rasim Selmanaj (born 1963), Kosovar writer and politician
- Rasim Tagirbekov (born 1984), Russian footballer
