= Yunis Huseynov =

Azerbaijani footballer (born 1965)

Personal information
- Full name: Yunis Husein oglu Huseynov
- Date of birth: 1 February 1965 (age 61)
- Place of birth: Kirovabad, Azerbaijani SSR, Soviet Union
- Height: 1.80 m (5 ft 11 in)
- Position: Striker

Team information
- Current team: Turan Tovuz (assistant coach)

Senior career*
Years	Team	Apps	(Gls)
1984–1998	Neftchi Baku	295	(86)
1998–1999	Kapaz	14	(3)
1999–2000	ANS Pivani	9	(0)
2000–2001	Kapaz	15	(5)

International career
1993–1998	Azerbaijan	34	(4)

Managerial career
- 2004–2005: Karvan
- 2005–2007: Karvan
- 2007: Standart Sumgayit
- 2008–2009: Karvan
- 2012: Khazar Lankaran
- 2015–2016: Khazar Lankaran
- 2017–2018: Kapaz
- 2020–2021: Keşla
- 2024–: Turan Tovuz (assist.)
- * Club domestic league appearances and goals

Yunis Huseynov (Azerbaijani: Yunis Hüseynov, born 1 February 1965) is an Azerbaijani football manager and former footballer. He is currently an assistant coach at Turan Tovuz. Huseynov made 33 appearances for the Azerbaijan national football team, scoring four goals.

== Career ==
On November 13, 2024, he was appointed as an assistant coach at Turan Tovuz.

== Career statistics ==
=== international ===
Azerbaijan national team
Year	Apps	Goals
1993	1	0
1994	6	0
1995	4	0
1996	8	1
1997	8	1
1998	7	2
Total	33	4

=== International goals ===
#	Date	Venue	Opponent	Score	Result	Competition
1.	27 February 1996	Baku, Azerbaijan	Faroe Islands	2–0	3-0	Friendly
2.	22 March 1997	Larnaka, Cyprus	Turkmenistan	0-2	0-3	Friendly
3.	22 March 1998	Baku, Azerbaijan	Moldova	1-0	1-0	Friendly
4.	24 April 1998	Baku, Azerbaijan	Uzbekistan	1-0	2-1	Friendly

== Honours ==
=== Club ===
Neftchi Baku

- Azerbaijan Premier League: 1992, 1995–96, 1996–97
- Azerbaijan Cup: 1994–95, 1995–96, 1998–99

=== Individual ===
- Azerbaijani Footballer of the Year (2): 1994, 1998

== Personal life ==
Hüseynov is married to politician and chess grandmaster Aynur Sofiyeva and they have two children.
