= List of Neftçi PFK seasons =

This is a list of seasons played by Neftçi Peşəkar Futbol Klubu in USSR, Azerbaijan and European football, from 1937 to the most recent completed season. It details the club's achievements in major competitions, and the top scorers for some season.

== Soviet Union (1937–1991) ==
Refs:

== Azerbaijan (1992–present) ==
Refs:

Season	Div.	Pos.	Pl.	W	D	L	GS	GA	P	Cup	Europe		Top scorer(s) (Note: Only includes goals scored in league)	Head Coach
1992	APL	1	36	30	2	4	104	23	62	QF	-		(Azerbaijan) Alakbarov (36)	(Azerbaijan) Alaskarov
1993	APL	5	18	11	5	2	39	11	27	QF	-		(Azerbaijan) Alakbarov (16)	(Azerbaijan) Kramarenko (Azerbaijan) Aghayev (Azerbaijan) Sadygov
1993–94	APL	8	30	11	7	12	37	11	29	QF	-		(Azerbaijan) Alakbarov (12)	(Azerbaijan) Sadygov
1994–95	APL	3	24	17	4	3	67	15	38	W	-		(Azerbaijan) Aliyev (26)	(Azerbaijan) Sadygov
1995–96	APL	1	20	11	6	3	42	17	39	W	WC	Qual.	(Azerbaijan) Aliyev (16)	(Azerbaijan) Sadygov (Azerbaijan) Aliyev (Azerbaijan) Tuaev
1996–97	APL	1	30	23	5	2	98	20	74	QF	UC	Qual.	(Azerbaijan) Gurbanov (34)	(Azerbaijan) Tuaev
1997–98	APL	6	26	13	4	9	43	23	43	SF	CL	Qual.	(Azerbaijan) Gurbanov (9)	(Azerbaijan) Abdullayev (Azerbaijan) Aliyev (Azerbaijan) Tuaev
1998–99	APL	3	26	15	4	4	57	18	52	W	-		(Ukraine) Kalfa (15)	(Azerbaijan) Tuaev (Azerbaijan) Aliyev (Azerbaijan) Alaskarov
1999–00	APL	3	22	13	4	5	35	17	43	SF	UC	Qual.	(Azerbaijan) Vasilyev (8)	(Azerbaijan) Alaskarov (Azerbaijan) Heydarov
2000–01	APL	2	20	16	3	1	57	11	51	RU	UC	Qual.	(Azerbaijan) Ismayilov (11)	(Azerbaijan) Namazov (Azerbaijan) O. Abdullayev
2001–02 (Note: The AFFA and the clubs were discontinued due to the conflict between the clubs and the results were not taken into account.)	APL	3	22	13	5	4	34	7	44	-	UC	Qual.	(Azerbaijan) Gurbanov (9)	(Azerbaijan) Ozbakov (Azerbaijan) Tuaev
2003–04	APL	1	26	22	3	1	66	15	69	W	-		(Azerbaijan) Vasilyev (17)	(Azerbaijan) Tuaev
2004–05	APL	1	34	24	6	4	52	18	78	QF	CL	Qual.	(Azerbaijan) Tagizade (14)	(Azerbaijan) Tuaev (Azerbaijan) Mirjavadov
2005–06	APL	3	26	15	9	2	51	16	54	SF	CL	Qual.	(Azerbaijan) Nabiyev (12)	(Azerbaijan) Mirjavadov
2006–07	APL	2	24	17	3	4	47	15	54	SF	-		(Georgia (country)) Adamia (10)	(Azerbaijan) Gurbanov
2007–08	APL	6	26	16	7	3	42	18	55	SF	UC	Qual.	(Azerbaijan) Subašić (14)	(Czech Republic) Petržela (Ukraine) Demyanenko
2008–09	APL	8	26	9	9	8	30	21	36	QF	IC	R3	(Romania) Neaga (5)	(Ukraine) Demyanenko (Germany) Gede (Azerbaijan) Aghayev
2009–10	APL	5	42	13	19	10	31	26	58	QF	-		(Romania) Neaga (11)	(Azerbaijan) Sadygov
2010–11	APL	1	32	19	10	3	53	17	67	QF	-		(Uzbekistan) Nasimov (15)	(Azerbaijan) Asadov
2011–12	APL	1	32	20	3	9	55	30	63	RU	CL	Qual.	(Uzbekistan) Nasimov (16)	(Azerbaijan) Hajiyev
2012–13	APL	1	32	19	5	8	59	32	62	W	CL; EL	Qual. GS	(Chile) Canales (26)	(Azerbaijan) Hajiyev
2013–14	APL	4	36	17	9	10	48	42	60	W	CL	Qual.	(Uzbekistan) Nasimov (7)	(Azerbaijan) Ahmadov (Azerbaijan) Suleymanov (Azerbaijan) Hajiyev
2014–15	APL	4	32	13	10	9	38	33	49	RU	EL	PO	(Chile) Canales (11)	(Azerbaijan) Hajiyev (Azerbaijan) Asadov
2015–16	APL	6	36	13	10	13	41	41	49	RU	EL	Qual.	(Azerbaijan) Qurbanov (13)	(Azerbaijan) Aliyev (Azerbaijan) A. Abdullayev (Azerbaijan) Gasimov
2016–17	APL	7	28	9	2	17	24	45	29	SF	EL	Qual.	(Spain) Lucas (4)	(Azerbaijan) Gasimov (Azerbaijan) E. Abdullayev
2017–18	APL	3	28	14	4	10	39	28	46	SF	-	-	(Chile) Herrera (8)	(Azerbaijan) E. Abdullayev (Azerbaijan) Ahmedov (Caretaker) (Azerbaijan) Ahmadov
2018–19	APL	2	28	17	7	4	52	26	58	2R	EL	2QR	(France) Dabo (14)	(Italy) Bordin
2019–20	APL	2	20	10	7	3	33	14	37	QF	EL	3QR	(France) Dabo (7) (France) Joseph-Monrose (7)	(Italy) Bordin (Azerbaijan) F. Mammedov
2020–21	APL	1	28	18	5	5	47	25	59	QF	EL	2QR	(Azerbaijan) Alaskarov (19)	(Azerbaijan) F. Mammedov (Azerbaijan) S. Abbasov
2021–22	APL	2	28	15	5	8	42	31	50	SF	CL; EL; ECL	2QR; 3QR; PO	(Brazil) Bezerra (10)	(Azerbaijan) S. Abbasov
2022–23	APL	3	36	20	8	8	63	38	68	SF	ECL	3QR	(Azerbaijan) Mahmudov (17)	(Romania) Reghecampf
2023–24	APL	5	36	16	8	12	51	40	56	RU	ECL	3QR	(Azerbaijan) Ozobić (7) (Azerbaijan) Hajiyev (7)	(Romania) Mutu (Montenegro) Božović
2024–25	APL	6	36	10	13	13	39	49	43	SF	—	—	(Azerbaijan) Ozobić (8)	(Ukraine) Hryhorchuk (Azerbaijan) Abasov
