= The Story of the Goal =

2013 book by Rasim Movsumov

- First edition
- Author: Rasim Movsumov
- Original title: Bir qolun tarixçəsi
- Language: Azerbaijani
- Genre: Non-fiction
- Publication date: 2013
- Publication place: Azerbaijan

The Story of the Goal (“Bir qolun tarixçəsi”) is a book by sports journalist Rasim Movsumov (Movsumzadeh), the jury member of the prestigious international football awards such as Ballon d'Or, The Best FIFA Football Awards, Golden Foot and World Soccer Awards.

The Story of the Goal was published in 2013 by AFFA. The book by Rasim Movsumov is about a goal scored by famous Azerbaijani footballer Anatoliy Banishevskiy for the USSR national team against Portugal during the match for third place at the 1966 FIFA World Cup in England. Some sources named different players as the authors of that goal.

The book contains a list of goals scored by Anatoliy Banishevskiy in official and unofficial matches of the USSR national team, as well as the groups’ table and the results of all matches of the 1966 FIFA World Cup. In addition, the book contains photographs from the tournament and the match for third place, as well as the official poster of the tournament.

== Awards ==
The Story of the Goal was awarded the Best Sport Book of the Year by the Association of Sports Journalists of Azerbaijan (AİJA) in 2013.

In addition, in 2013 Rasim Movsumov received the Football Oscar Award (Turkey) as the Best Foreign Sports Writer in Turkey.

== Libraries ==
The Story of the Goal is kept in the National Library of Azerbaijan, as well as in the libraries of the FIFA World Football Museum in Switzerland, the CONMEBOL South American Football Museum in Paraguay, The National Soccer Hall of Fame located in Texas, and also at The British Library, the largest national library in the world, and the Vernadsky National Library of Ukraine.

== Anatoliy Banishevskiy 60 ==
Rasim Movsumov is also the author of the booklet named Anatoliy Banishevskiy 60 which was published in 2006.
