= 1966 Soviet Top League =

29th season of top-tier football league in Soviet Union

Soviet Top League
- Season: 1966

== Overview ==
- 19 teams took part in the league with FC Dynamo Kyiv winning the championship.
- FC Dynamo Kyiv qualified for Champions Cup 1967–68 and FC Torpedo Moscow qualified for CWC 1967–68 as runners-up of the Soviet Cup 1965–66.
- The top 3 team with the most wins qualified for the World Cup.

== League standings ==
Pos	Team	Pld	W	D	L	GF	GA	GD	Pts	Qualification or relegation
1	(Ukrainian Soviet Socialist Republic) Dynamo Kyiv (C)	36	23	10	3	66	17	+49	56	Qualification for European Cup first round
2	(Russian Soviet Federative Socialist Republic) SKA Rostov-on-Don	36	20	7	9	54	44	+10	47	
3	(Azerbaijan Soviet Socialist Republic) Neftyanik Baku	36	18	9	9	56	28	+28	45	
4	(Russian Soviet Federative Socialist Republic) Spartak Moscow	36	15	12	9	45	41	+4	42	
5	(Russian Soviet Federative Socialist Republic) CSKA Moscow	36	16	9	11	60	45	+15	41	
6	(Russian Soviet Federative Socialist Republic) Torpedo Moscow	36	15	10	11	55	39	+16	40	Qualification for Cup Winners' Cup first round
7	(Georgian Soviet Socialist Republic) Dinamo Tbilisi	36	13	14	9	47	34	+13	40	
8	(Russian Soviet Federative Socialist Republic) Dynamo Moscow	36	12	14	10	43	34	+9	38	
9	(Uzbek Soviet Socialist Republic) Pakhtakor Tashkent	36	10	18	8	36	32	+4	38	
10	(Ukrainian Soviet Socialist Republic) Shakhtar Donetsk	36	15	7	14	32	35	−3	37	
11	(Byelorussian Soviet Socialist Republic) Dinamo Minsk	36	11	13	12	36	39	−3	35	
12	(Kazakh Soviet Socialist Republic) Kairat Alma-Ata	36	12	11	13	30	39	−9	35	
13	(Armenian Soviet Socialist Republic) Ararat Yerevan	36	12	10	14	30	45	−15	34	
14	(Ukrainian Soviet Socialist Republic) Chornomorets Odessa	36	10	13	13	29	36	−7	33	
15	(Georgian Soviet Socialist Republic) Torpedo Kutaisi	36	9	10	17	44	59	−15	28	
16	(Russian Soviet Federative Socialist Republic) Zenit Leningrad	36	10	8	18	35	54	−19	28	
17	(Russian Soviet Federative Socialist Republic) Lokomotiv Moscow	36	11	5	20	34	49	−15	27	
18	(Russian Soviet Federative Socialist Republic) Krylya Sovetov Kuybyshev	36	4	17	15	18	40	−22	25	
19	(Ukrainian Soviet Socialist Republic) SKA Odessa (R)	36	1	13	22	16	56	−40	15	Relegation to Class A Second Group

Source: rsssf.com
(C) Champions; (R) Relegated

== Results ==
Home \ Away	ARA	CHO	CSK	DYK	DMN	DYN	DTB	KAI	KRY	LOK	NEF	PAK	SHA	SKA	SKO	SPA	TKU	TOR	ZEN
Ararat Yerevan		0–0	0–4	0–1	3–1	0–0	1–0	1–3	0–0	2–0	2–0	0–0	2–0	1–0	0–0	1–0	1–0	1–1	2–0
Chornomorets Odessa	2–1		3–5	0–0	1–0	3–3	1–0	0–0	1–0	1–0	1–0	1–1	0–0	0–1	0–1	2–0	2–0	1–1	1–2
CSKA Moscow	3–0	2–0		0–0	1–2	2–0	0–1	2–0	3–1	1–2	1–1	1–1	0–1	4–6	4–2	1–2	0–2	1–2	2–1
Dynamo Kyiv	1–0	3–0	4–0		1–0	2–0	4–0	3–0	4–0	1–0	1–2	0–0	4–3	1–1	1–1	1–0	3–1	2–0	4–0
Dinamo Minsk	0–2	3–1	1–1	0–4		3–1	3–1	1–0	0–0	2–1	0–0	1–0	1–0	1–1	2–1	1–2	2–2	0–1	1–1
Dynamo Moscow	7–2	2–0	2–4	0–0	0–0		2–1	2–0	0–0	1–0	2–0	1–1	1–1	4–0	0–0	4–0	1–1	0–2	2–0
Dinamo Tbilisi	5–0	1–1	1–1	3–1	1–1	2–0		0–0	1–0	2–0	1–0	1–1	1–0	3–1	0–0	0–1	3–1	0–0	3–0
Kairat Alma-Ata	0–0	1–0	0–0	2–4	3–1	0–0	1–1		3–0	1–1	1–0	0–0	0–0	1–1	2–0	1–2	2–1	1–3	1–0
Krylya Sovetov Kuybyshev	0–0	0–0	0–0	1–1	0–0	2–0	2–1	0–0		0–0	2–3	1–2	1–0	0–1	1–1	0–0	0–0	1–3	1–0
Lokomotiv Moscow	2–0	1–0	1–5	0–3	3–1	1–1	0–3	1–2	0–0		0–0	2–0	1–2	1–2	2–0	1–0	3–1	0–1	3–2
Neftyanik Baku	0–0	1–0	0–0	0–0	0–0	1–0	3–2	3–0	0–0	2–0		5–0	2–0	4–1	3–2	3–0	7–0	2–0	3–0
Pakhtakor Tashkent	4–1	2–2	1–1	0–1	1–0	1–1	0–0	0–1	0–0	1–0	3–2		3–1	0–1	5–0	1–2	0–0	1–1	0–0
Shakhtar Donetsk	3–0	1–1	0–1	0–2	2–0	0–0	1–0	1–0	1–0	1–0	1–0	1–0		0–2	1–0	1–2	2–0	1–0	1–0
SKA Rostov-on-Don	3–1	2–0	2–1	1–6	1–0	0–0	1–2	3–1	2–0	0–2	1–3	0–1	2–0		3–2	0–0	2–1	2–1	3–0
SKA Odessa	0–3	0–2	0–1	0–2	1–1	0–2	0–0	0–1	0–2	0–2	1–1	0–1	0–0	0–2		1–1	0–2	1–4	0–1
Spartak Moscow	0–0	1–0	2–4	0–1	0–0	1–0	1–1	2–0	4–1	4–1	2–1	1–1	1–0	2–2	1–1		4–3	0–2	1–1
Torpedo Kutaisi	3–1	0–1	2–3	0–0	1–4	0–1	3–3	2–0	2–0	3–1	0–1	1–1	3–1	0–0	0–0	1–3		4–2	1–0
Torpedo Moscow	1–2	1–1	2–0	2–0	0–2	4–0	1–1	3–0	3–0	2–1	1–2	1–1	1–2	1–3	1–1	1–1	2–2		3–0
Zenit Leningrad	1–0	0–0	0–1	0–0	1–1	0–3	2–2	1–2	3–2	2–1	3–1	1–2	4–2	0–1	2–0	2–2	3–1	2–1	

Legend: Blue = home team win; Yellow = draw; Red = away team win.

== Top scorers ==
20 goals

- Ilya Datunashvili (Dinamo Tbilisi)

19 goals

- Anatoliy Byshovets (Dynamo Kyiv)

15 goals

- Boris Kazakov (CSKA Moscow)
- Nikolai Osyanin (Spartak Moscow)

14 goals

- Kazbek Tuaev (Neftyanik Baku)
- Oleg Kopayev (SKA Rostov-on-Don)
- Vladimir Kozlov (Lokomotiv Moscow)
- Gennadi Matveyev (SKA Rostov-on-Don)

12 goals

- Anatoliy Banishevskiy (Neftyanik Baku)
- Eduard Markarov (Neftyanik Baku)
- Eduard Streltsov (Torpedo Moscow)
