= Rasim Mövsümov =

Sportswriter and juror for international football awards

- Born: Rasim Mövsümov (Mövsümzadə)
- Education: Academy of Public Administration (Azerbaijan)
- Occupations: Sportswriter, Juror
- Years active: 1991–present
- Known for: Juror for international football awards, including Ballon d'Or, FIFA The Best, Golden Foot, and World Soccer Awards
- Notable work: The Story of the Goal* (2013)
- Awards: Best Football Writer of Azerbaijan (2003, 2007, 2009), Football Oscar Award (Best Foreign Sports Writer, 2013)

Rasim Mövsümov (Mövsümzadeh) (Azerbaijani: Rasim Mövsümov (Mövsümzadə) is a sportswriter and juror for international football awards. He judges The Best FIFA Football Awards, Ballon d’Or, Golden Foot and the World Soccer Awards.

== Early life ==
He attended the Academy of Public Administration (Azerbaijan).

== Writing experience ==
Since 1991, Mövsümov began writing articles for newspapers and magazines in Azerbaijan, Turkey (Futbol Extra Trabzonspor Magazine, Futbol Plus), Germany (Kicker), France (France Football), England, Poland (Przegląd Sportowy), Russia (Sport Express), Ukraine, Israel and Moldova (Спорт Curier).

Since 1996, he author the matchday programmes of the Azerbaijan National Football Team and Azerbaijan clubs in Euro Cups (Neftçi - Widzew 1997, Neftçi - Crvena Zvezda 1999, Bakı - Žilina 2005, MKT-Araz - Tiraspol 2006, Bakı - Sioni 2006, MKT-Araz - Groclin Dyskobolia 2007, Bakı - Dacia 2007, Olimpik - Vojvodina 2008, Xəzər Lənkəran - Olimpia Bălţi 2010, etc.).

He began writing for The European Football Yearbook in 2007. He is a member of the AIPS (International Sports Press Association).

== Juror ==
- Since 2000 – The Juror for the Ballon d’Or Award of the France Football Magazine.
- Since 2011 – The Juror of the UEFA and European Sports Media for the UEFA Best Player in Europe Award. He represented Azerbaijan in Monaco in UEFA events and voted on the award every year.
- Since 2012 – Golden Foot Award Juror and Jury President in 2014.
- Since 2014 – World Soccer Awards Juror.
- Since 2017 – The Best FIFA Football Awards Juror.

== AFFA referee observer ==
He was an AFFA referee observer for Azerbaijan youth leagues in the 2014/15 season. His first match was 11/18/2014. Vatan - Khazar Lankaran 1-3 (U-15 League, 9th round).

== Recognition ==
Mövsümov received The Best Football Writer of Azerbaijan from the Association of Sports Journalists of Azerbaijan in 2003, 2007 and 2009.

In 2013, he penned The Story of the Goal (Bir qolun tarixçəsi), based on Azerbaijan player Anatoliy Banishevskiy (1966 FIFA World Cup). This book was awarded Best Sport Book of the Year by the Association of Sports Journalists of Azerbaijan.

In the same year, he received the Football Oscar Award (Turkey) in the category Best Foreign Sports Writer.
