= Neftçi-2 =

- Full name: Neftçi-2
- Nickname(s): Flaqman (Flagship); Neftçilər (Oil Workers) "Xalq komandası" (The People's Team)
- Founded: 2018
- Ground: ASK Arena
- Capacity: 8,125
- President: Kamran Guliyev
- Manager: vacant
- League: Azerbaijan First Division
- 2018–19: 3rd

Neftçi-2 is an Azerbaijani football team from Baku. It plays in the Azerbaijan First Division (second level). It is a reserve team of Azerbaijan Premier League side Neftçi.

== History ==
The team was founded in 2018 and participates in the Azerbaijan First Division.

== Honours ==
- Azerbaijan First Division

Winners (1): 2020–21

== Current squad ==
As of 18 October 2020

Note: Flags indicate national team as defined under FIFA eligibility rules; some limited exceptions apply. Players may hold more than one non-FIFA nationality.

No.	Pos.	Nation	Player
32	MF	(Azerbaijan) AZE	Javidan Rahimli
41	GK	(Azerbaijan) AZE	Emin Isgandarli
43	GK	(Azerbaijan) AZE	Zeynal Ahmadzade
44	DF	(Azerbaijan) AZE	Seymur Aliyev
45	MF	(Azerbaijan) AZE	Ali Mursalov
46	DF	(Azerbaijan) AZE	Javad Gurbanli
47	DF	(Azerbaijan) AZE	Asgar Huseynov
48	DF	(Azerbaijan) AZE	Ramin Taghiyev
54	MF	(Azerbaijan) AZE	Huseyn Ahmadov
56	DF	(Azerbaijan) AZE	Elton Alibeyli
65	MF	(Azerbaijan) AZE	Amrah Bayramov
71	FW	(Azerbaijan) AZE	Mahammad Maharramov

No.	Pos.	Nation	Player
75	DF	(Azerbaijan) AZE	Nihad Gurbanli
76	DF	(Azerbaijan) AZE	Joshgun Asadzade
79	DF	(Azerbaijan) AZE	Mirali Ahmadov
84	FW	(Azerbaijan) AZE	Ziya Mammadli
85	MF	(Azerbaijan) AZE	Nihad Jafarov
90	FW	(Azerbaijan) AZE	Nijat Musayev
92	MF	(Azerbaijan) AZE	Valeh Gahramanli
97	FW	(Azerbaijan) AZE	Nazim Baghirov

== Managers ==
- (Azerbaijan) Mahmud Qurbanov (2018–present)
