= 1994–95 Azerbaijan Cup =

1994-95 Azerbaijan Cup
Tournament details
- Country: Azerbaijan

Final positions
- Champions: Neftchi Baku
- Runners-up: FK Kur

The Azerbaijan Cup 1994-95 was the fourth season of the annual cup competition in Azerbaijan with the final taking place on 28 May 1995.

== Round of 16 ==
Team 1	Agg.	Team 2	1st leg	2nd leg
Energetik Əli-Bayramlı	3–4	İnşaatçı Baku	1–2	2–2
Bakı fəhləsi	1–6	Neftchi Baku	0–2	1–4
Khazri Buzovna	1–6	Karabakh	w/o	1–3
Pambiqci Neftcala	1–5	FK Masallı	1–2	1–3
Sabail Baku	2–1	Pambygchi Barda	2–0	0–1
FK Kur	3–2	Turan Tovuz	1–0	2–2
Khazar Lankaran	1–11	Khazar Sumgayit	1–8	w/o
Daşqın Zaqatala	2–11	Kapaz	2–3	0–8

== Quarterfinals ==
Team 1	Agg.	Team 2	1st leg	2nd leg
İnşaatçı Baku	1–8	Neftchi Baku	1–5	0–3
FK Masallı	0–3	Khazri Buzovna	0–2	0–1
FK Kur	3–0	Sabail Baku	2–0	1–0
Kapaz	9–4	Khazar Sumgayit	3–0	6–4

== Semifinals ==
Team 1	Agg.	Team 2	1st leg	2nd leg
Neftchi Baku	4–1	Khazri Buzovna	2–1	2–0
Kapaz	4–4(a)	FK Kur	3–3	1–1

== Final ==
28 May 1995
AZST (UTC+5)

Neftchi Baku	1–0	FK Kur
Huseynov 78'

Tofiq Bahramov Stadium, Baku
Attendance: 5,000
