= Neftçi PFK =

Azerbaijani association football club

Neftçi
- Full name: Neftçi Peşəkar Futbol Klubu
- Nicknames: Neftçilər (The Oil Workers); Flaqman (The Flagship); Xalqın komandası (The Nation's Team)
- Founded: 18 March 1937; 89 years ago as Neftyanik
- Ground: Neftçi Arena
- Capacity: 10,289
- Owner: SOCAR
- CEO: Cenk Sümer
- Head coach: Yuriy Vernydub
- League: Azerbaijan Premier League
- 2025–26: Azerbaijan Premier League, 4th of 12
- Website: neftchi.az
Home colours	Away colours	Third colours

Neftçi Peşəkar Futbol Klubu, known simply as Neftçi (pronounced [nefˈtʃi], lit. 'Oilmen') or Neftchi Baku, is an Azerbaijani professional football club based in the capital Baku, that plays in the Azerbaijan Premier League, the highest tier of Azerbaijan football. The club was founded on 18 March 1937 and played under the name of Neftyanik until 1968. Since then, the club has been competing under the name of Neftçi.

Neftçi played for a total of 27 seasons in the Top Division of Soviet football. The main achievement of that period is the bronze medals of the USSR Championship won in 1966. Neftçi has won nine Azerbaijan Premier League titles, six Azerbaijan Cups and two Azerbaijan Supercup titles. The club is one of the two teams in Azerbaijan, along with Qarabağ, which has participated in all Azerbaijan Premier League championships so far.

In 2012, Neftçi became the first Azerbaijani club to advance to the group stage of a European competition after defeating APOEL 4–2 on aggregate in the play-off round of the 2012–13 UEFA Europa League. Neftçi plays its matches at the Neftçi Arena in Baku, which also serves as the venue for Azerbaijan national team matches.

== History ==
=== Soviet era (1937–1991) ===
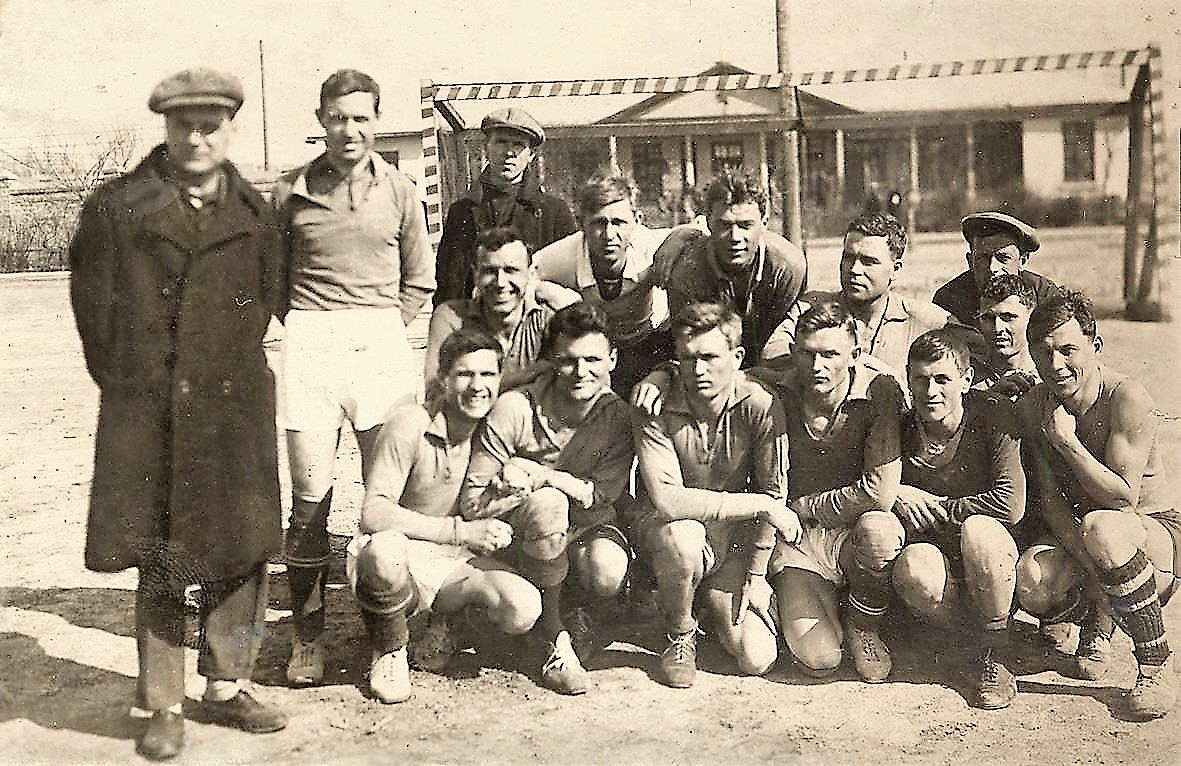
Neftyanik squad from 1937 season.

The club was founded on 18 March 1937 and played under the name of Neftyanik until 1968. The first official match of Neftyanik took place on May 24, 1937. In the 1/64 finals of the Soviet Cup, Neftyanik beat FC Dinamo Yerevan (1:0). The goal scored by Pavel Shtyrlin in the 87th minute was the first in the history of Neftçi.

The team, which has played since the USSR championships in the group G, took the 11th place among 12 participants. In the same year, in the matches for the USSR Cup, Neftyanik, although he won in 1/64 and 1/32 finals in the Dinamo teams from Yerevan and Batumi, lost in the 1/16 finals, to the Dinamo Tbilisi.

Between 1938 and 1941, Neftyanik also played in local Azerbaijani and Caucasus championships. At the start of World War II, the players had to join the army. Mirmehdi Aghayev, who played for the club before the war, was among those killed in action. As the war drew to an end, the team gradually resumed operations and in 1944, Neftyanik returned to the Azerbaijani championship, becoming champions the following year.

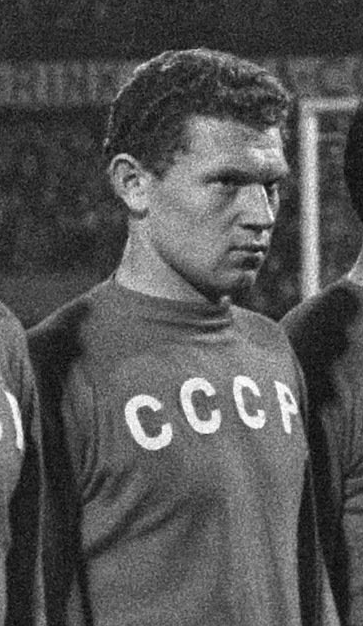
Anatoliy Banishevskiy is the club's top scorer during the Soviet Union era, with an overall 136 goals.

Neftyanik competed in the 2nd Group of the USSR championship in 1946–1948, and qualified for the first time in its history for the 1st Group (Top League) in 1949. After Temp Baku, which played only in one season in the 1st Group eleven years ago, Neftyanik became the second representative of the Republic at that level in the history of Azerbaijan football. The first Top League match was against the VVS Moscow at the then Lenin Stadium (now Ismat Gayibov Stadium). In this historic match, the team won with a score of 1:0. The first goal in group A of the championship of the USSR was recorded by Viktor Anoshkin. They finished the Top Division in 14th place in their debut season. Playing in the Top Division for two consecutive years, Neftyanik left it in 1950 and had to play in the Class B again. The team qualified for the second time in its history for the Top League in 1960, and by playing regularly in the Top League during 1960–1965.

The 1966 season stands out in the history of Neftçi, as the club achieved its biggest success in the USSR championships by finishing third. By beating Spartak Moscow 3:0 in the last game of the championship in the current Tofiq Bahramov Republican Stadium on 30 November, the Black and Whites, coached by 31-year-old Ahmad Alaskarov, reached 45 points and finished only two points short of the second-placed Rostov Army Club. Dynamo Kyiv won the championship with 56 points. Two years later, in 1968, the club began the 30th USSR championship as Neftçi rather than Neftyanik.

Neftçi dropped to the Second Division in 1972 and spent the 1973–76 seasons there. Elbrus Abbasov played a great role in the team's comeback. By scoring 28 goals, he became the Second Division's top scorer, helping the Black and Whites finish second and qualify for the top flight again. In 1987 season, Neftçi coached by Aghasalim Mirjavadov, finished the championship in 9th place, registering its best performance since 1971. The team was known for its attacking trio which included Isgandar Javadov, Mashalla Ahmadov and Igor Ponomaryov. 1988 was a disappointing season for the club, as they finished 15th and were relegated to the Second Division. Aghasalim Mirjavadov coached them in the first half of the season and Yuriy Kuznetsov in the second, but neither could save the team from relegation.

=== Domestic hegemony (1991–2012) ===
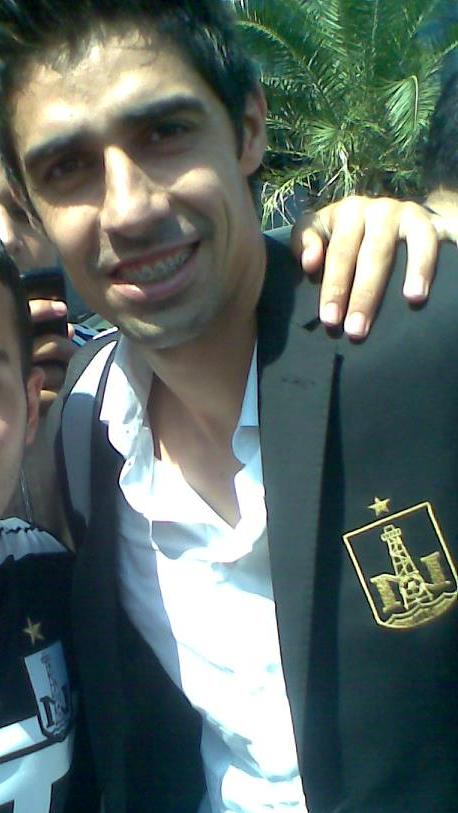
Flavinho is Neftçi's first foreign captain.

Neftçi won the first Azerbaijani national championship having begun as clear favourites, since many of the players playing for the club at the end of the Soviet period remained. The team was coached by Ahmad Alaskarov. Another success came three years later. In 1995, Neftçi, led by Vagif Sadygov, defeated all rivals in the fight for the Cup of Azerbaijan. 1995–1996 season, Neftçi finished with a "golden double" — won the national championship and became the owner of the Cup. This success was achieved thanks to the efforts of coaches Vagif Sadygov, Asif Aliyev and Kazbek Tuaev.

In 2006, Neftçi managed to win the CIS Cup after defeating FBK Kaunas of Lithuania in the final. In European competitions, the club also have advanced to the second qualifying round of the UEFA Champions League twice, having defeated Bosnian champions – NK Široki Brijeg – and Icelandic champions – FH Hafnarfjarðar – in 2004 and 2005 respectively. Neftçi advanced to the third round of the 2008 Intertoto Cup, after defeating the Slovak club FC Nitra and the Belgian side K.F.C. Germinal Beerschot in the first two rounds.

A long period of decline followed the success of the 2005 to the end of the decade. Despite the appointment of famous names such as Gurban Gurbanov, Vlastimil Petržela, Anatoliy Demyanenko and Hans-Jürgen Gede, the club did not achieve any success and squandered large sums of money on unsuccessful signings.

Prospects changed positively in December 2009 when the club's control was given to Sadıq Sadıqov. The takeover was immediately followed by a flurry of bids for high-profile international players such as Bahodir Nasimov, Nicolás Canales, Flavinho, Bruno Bertucci, Eric Ramos, Igor Mitreski and Julius Wobay. In May 2011, coached by Arif Asadov, the club won its sixth championship title. Asadov also become the first person in Azerbaijan to win the league title as a coach and football player. However, Asadov was dismissed after the defeat to Dinamo Zagreb in the qualifying round of the Champions League 2011–2012 season.

In the 2011–12 season, Boyukagha Hajiyev guided Neftçi to another domestic success as the club become champions for seventh time in their history. In November 2011, Neftçi celebrated its 1,000th victory in official matches and its 1,000th goal in Azerbaijan League, scored by Araz Abdullayev.

=== European breakthrough (2012–present) ===
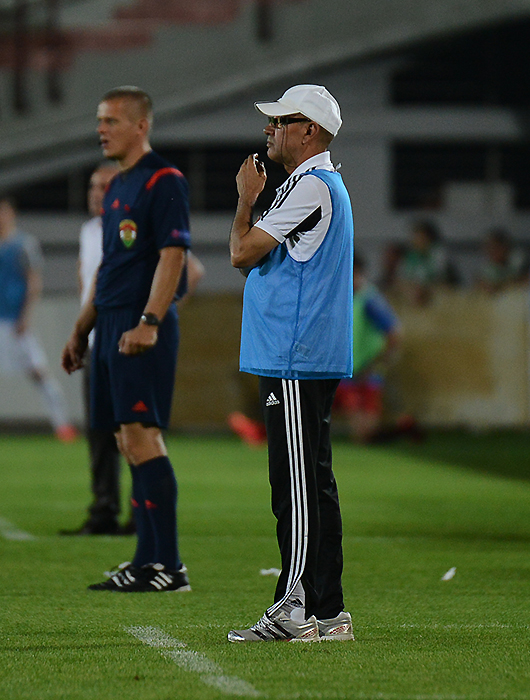
Under Hajiyev's management, Neftçi became the first team to represent Azerbaijan in the group stage of a European competition.

In 2012, Neftçi qualified for the 2012–13 UEFA Europa League group stage, being the first Azerbaijani team to advance to this stage in a European competition. Neftçi managed to get three points in six matches, drawing with Partizan both times and holding Internazionale away at the San Siro.

A third consecutive Premier League title followed in 2012–13. Neftçi then won the Azerbaijan Cup on 28 May 2013 to secure the domestic double. Following Neftçi's early exit from European cups, Boyukagha Hajiyev resigned from his post. Following defeat at 2013 Azerbaijan Supercup, Nazim Suleymanov was appointed as Neftçi's new manager after Tarlan Ahmadov was sacked just three months in charge. On 8 January 2014, Suleymanov resigned as manager after a transfer fund dispute. In May 2014, despite finishing fourth, Neftçi managed to win Azerbaijan Cup. In August 2014, the club reached Europa League play-off round after defeating Chikhura Sachkhere on aggregate.

On 2 November 2014, Neftçi club president Sadygov stated that the club was experiencing financial difficulties. In 2015, it was announced that the club would become a public limited company – Neftchi PLC, while the club's new president would be Chingiz Abdullayev.

On 8 June 2018, Roberto Bordin was announced as Neftçi's new manager on a two-year contract. Under the head coach of Roberto Bordin, the team finished Azerbaijan Premier League in second place and they have advanced two qualifying rounds in the UEFA Europa League. On 18 January 2020, the club officially announced that the contract with Bordin mutually terminated, and he was replaced temporarily by his assistant Fizuli Mammadov.

On 11 November 2020, Samir Abasov was appointed manager. The contract between the parties was signed until the end of the 2021/2022 season. In the first season under his coach, the club won the Azerbaijan Premier league after 7 years again.

On 11 July 2023, Adrian Mutu was appointed as Neftçi's new Head Coach on a two-year contract.

On June 26, 2024, Roman Hryhorchuk was appointed as club's head coach. On October 7, 2024, his contract with the club was terminated by mutual agreement. Under his leadership, Neftçi played in 9 rounds of the Azerbaijani Premier League, recording 5 draws and 4 losses.

== Grounds ==
Neftçi's current home venue is the 10,289 capacity Neftçi Arena. It has been the club's home since the 2012–13 season.

Neftçi's home matches are usually played at Tofiq Bahramov Stadium in Baku until 2012. Built by German prisoners of war in 1951, it was renamed after famous football referee Tofiq Bahramov in 1993 after his death. The stadium also serves as the home ground of the Azerbaijan national football team and holds 31,200 spectators, making it the second-largest stadium in the country.

== Supporters ==
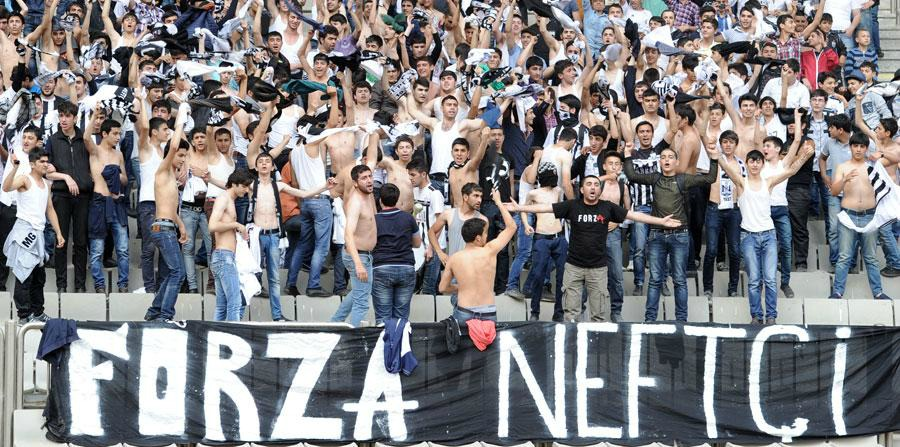
"Forza Neftçi" during at Tofiq Bahramov Republican Stadium.

Neftçi is one of the most supported clubs in Azerbaijan, with supporters organized in many fan clubs around the world, including the United States, Turkey, Russia and any other country with a sizeable Azerbaijani community. Neftçi's fans are the first to bring Ultras Culture to Azerbaijan. Various companies were Neftçi's number of participating groups. Among them are "Flaqman", "Ultra Neftçi", "Neftçimania" and Forza Neftçi. Currently, the biggest fan group of the club is "Forza Neftçi". In the 2010s, although Neftçi improved its position, the average attendance fell to record low levels.

The club's most popular celebrity supporters are the likes of actors Bahram Bagirzade, Bashir Safaroglu and Lutfali Abdullayev, composers Gara Garayev, Fikrat Amirov and Niyazi, judoka Ilham Zakiyev and scientist Mirali Qashqai.

== Rivalry ==
=== Rivalry with Khazar Lankaran ===
Matches between Neftçi and Khazar Lankaran are some of the biggest clashes in Azerbaijan. The relationship between the two clubs has always been known for its great animosity, as the classic opposes two geographic regions – with Neftçi and Khazar Lankaran representing the north and south of Azerbaijan, respectively.

== Recent seasons ==
Statistics from the previous decade. For a full history see; List of Neftçi PFK seasons

Season	League	Rank	P	W	D	L	F	A	GD	Pts	Cup	CL	EL	ECL
2016–17	Premier League	7	28	9	2	17	24	45	−21	29	SF	2QR		
2017–18	Premier League	3	28	14	4	10	39	28	+11	46	SF	—		
2018–19	Premier League	2	28	17	7	4	52	26	+26	58	2R	1QR		
2019–20	Premier League	2	20	10	7	3	33	14	+19	37	QF	3QR		
2020–21	Premier League	1	28	18	5	5	47	25	+22	59	QF	2QR		
2021–22	Premier League	2	28	15	5	8	42	31	+11	50	SF	2QR	3QR	PO
2022–23	Premier League	3	36	20	8	8	63	38	+25	68	Runner-up	—		3QR
2023–24	Premier League	5	36	16	8	12	51	40	+11	56	SF	—		3QR
2024–25	Premier League	6	36	10	13	13	39	49	-10	43	SF	—		
2025–26	Premier League	4	33	16	11	6	57	32	+25	59	Last 16	—		

Key

Rank = Rank in the league; P = Played; W = Win; D = Draw; L = Loss; F = Goals for; A = Goals against; GD = Goal difference; Pts = Points; Cup = Azerbaijan Cup; CL = UEFA Champions League; EL = UEFA Europa League; ECL = UEFA Europa Conference League.
in = Still in competition; – = Not attended; 1R = 1st round; 2R = 2nd round; 3R = 3rd round; 1QR = 1st qualifying round; 2QR = 2nd qualifying round; 3QR = 3rd qualifying round; PO = Play-off round; GS = Group stage; R16 = Round of sixteen; QF = Quarter-finals; SF = Semi-finals.

== Crest and colours ==
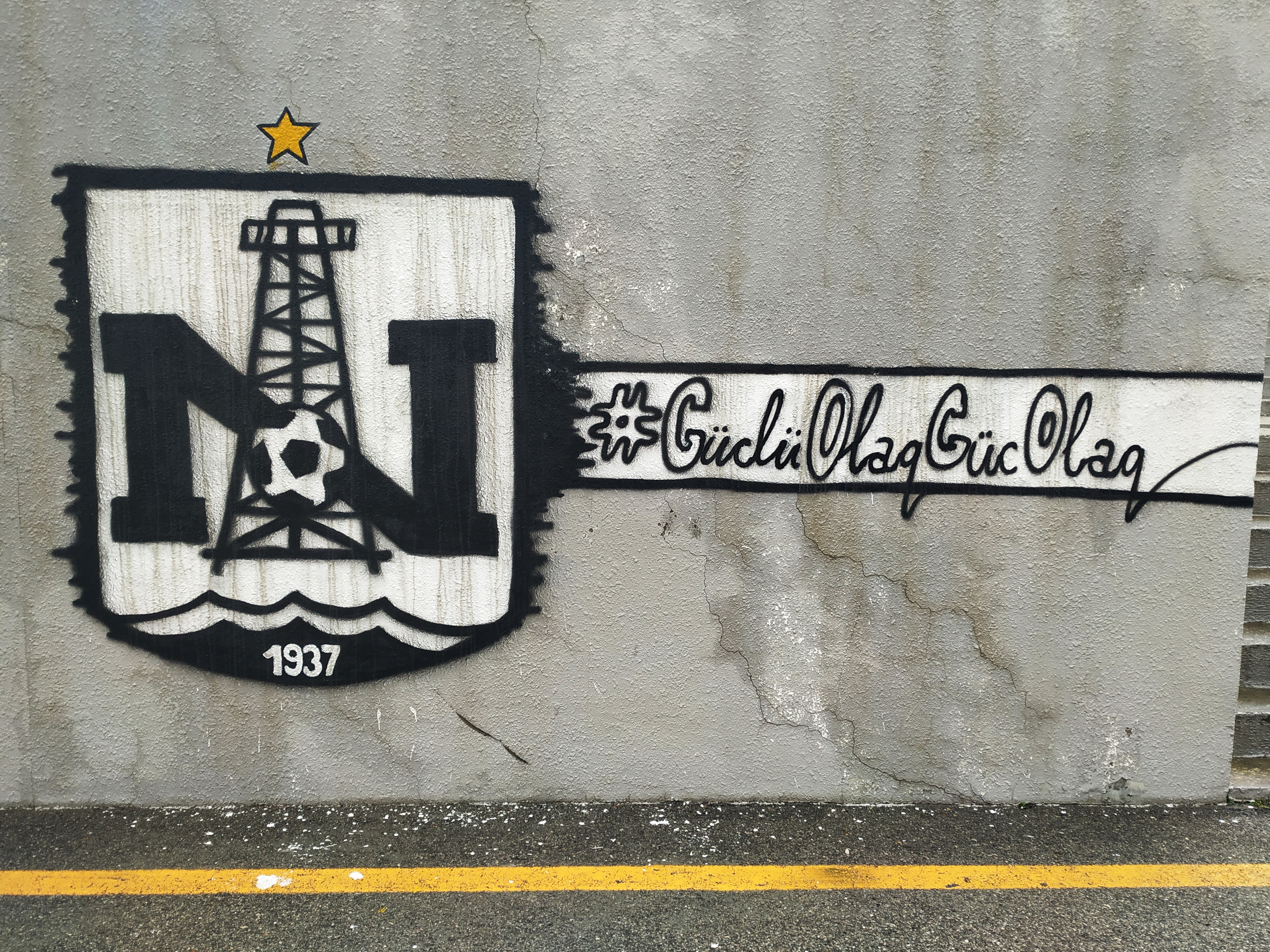
Mural in the Neftçi Arena

In 1937 Baku had already gained a reputation as an oil city. Therefore, those working in the field of "black gold" soon formed a football team on 18 March 1937. But they didn't have to think much about the name. They gave own names to the team. The color of "black gold" also formed the basis of the form. At that time, along with oil, cotton, called "white gold", played no less a role in the glory of the Azerbaijani SSR than oil, so it was decided that the color of cotton should be reflected in the form. Since then, Neftçi, has remained faithful to black-white.

1949 means for history of Neftçi not less than the year of its establishment. That year taking part under the name Neftyanik, the club was qualified for the first time in its history for the Soviet Top League. A radical changes were made in the staff of Neftyanik with the aim to provide successes of the team among Football elite. Also the team logotype was made. The emblem was the letter "Н" of the Cyrillic Alphabet against the background of an oil rig – the first letter of the word Neftyannik. The logo of Neftçi has been changed four times, in 1977, 1997, 2004 and in 2024.

=== Shirt sponsors and kit manufacturers ===
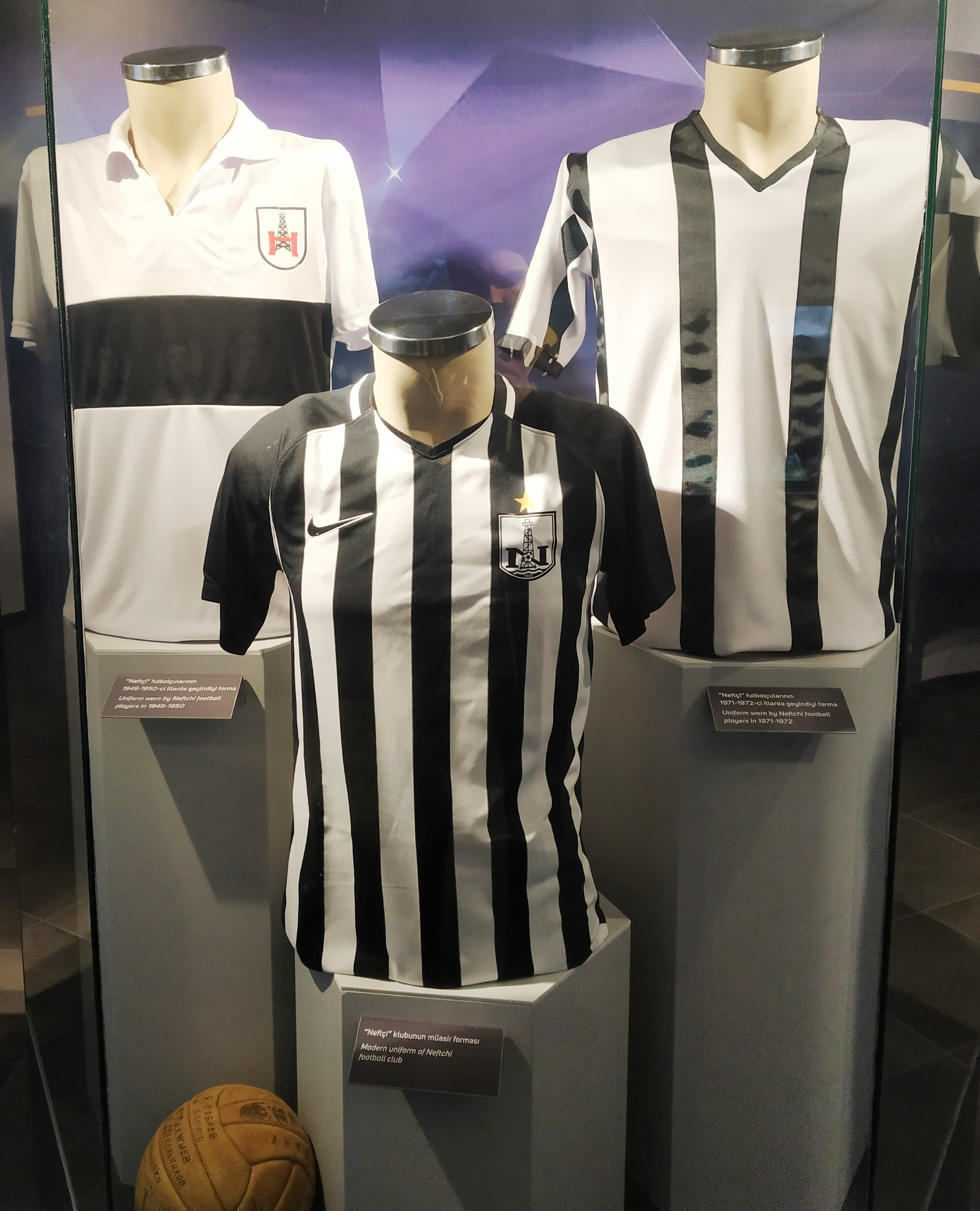
Historical kits on display in the Neftçi PFK museum

Neftçi's traditional kit was composed of black shirts, white shorts and socks of the same colour. Although through the years these two have gone from alternating between white and black stripes.

Period	Kit manufacturer	Primary Shirt Sponsor
1992–1993	Adidas	ÇAPHAS
1993–1994	Adidas	DIŞ. TİC. A.Ş
1994–1998	Adidas	RIAD
1998–2003	Adidas	none
2004	unknown	AZƏRNEFTYANACAQ NEZ
2004	Stadium	BNEZ
2005–2007	Lotto	SOCAR
2007–2016	Adidas	SOCAR
2016–2017	Adidas	asan xidmət
2017	Kappa	asan xidmət
2018	Kappa	none
2018–2019	Nike	none
2019–2023	Nike	Turkish Airlines
2023–2025	Erreà	SOCAR
2025–	Kappa	Palms Sports

== Sponsorship ==
On February 7, 2025, Neftçi signed a five-year sponsorship agreement with "Palms Sports," owned by International Holding Company. The club's Chief Executive Director, Cenk Sümer, stated that the revenue from the agreement accounted for 30% of the club's annual income.

== European record ==
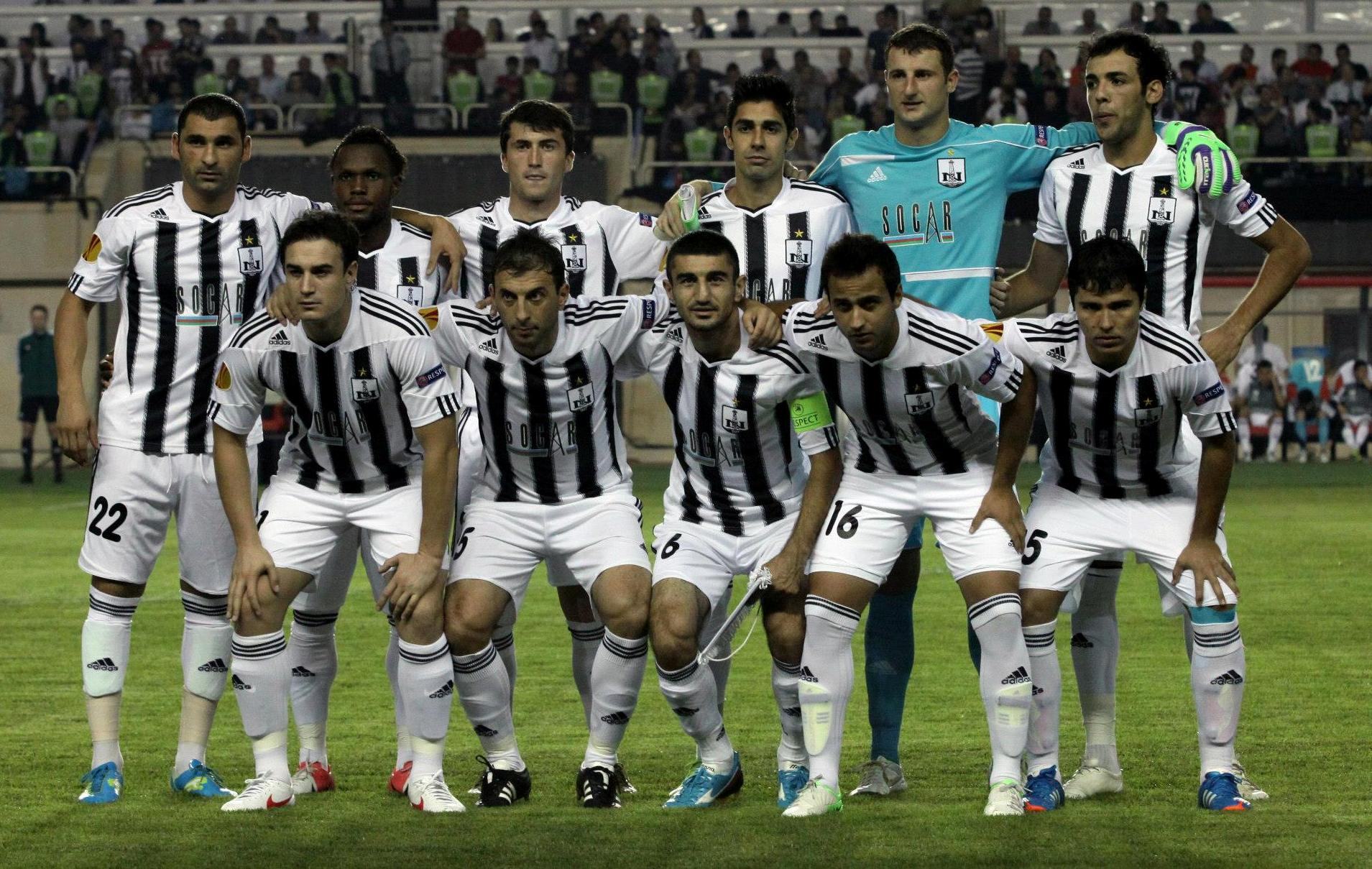
Neftçi in Europa League before the match with Internazionale in 2012.

The club have participated in 23 editions of the club competitions governed by UEFA, the chief authority for football across Europe. Counting all of the 83 games the side have played in UEFA competitions since their first entry into the Cup Winners' Cup in the 1995–96 season, the team's record stands at 27 wins, 20 draws and 37 defeats.

As of match played 5 August 2026

Tournament	P	W	D	L	GF	GA	GD	Win%
UEFA Champions League	22	7	5	10	20	36	−16	31.82
UEFA Cup / UEFA Europa League	42	13	11	18	56	62	−6	30.95
UEFA Europa Conference League	12	4	2	6	17	23	−6	33.33
UEFA Cup Winners' Cup	2	0	1	1	0	3	−3	0.00
UEFA Intertoto Cup	6	3	1	2	7	7	+0	50.00
Total	84	27	20	37	100	131	−31	32.14

=== Matches ===
As of 5 August 2026

Games of Neftçi in UEFA competitions
Season	Competition	Round	Club	Home	Away	Aggregate
1995–96	Cup Winners' Cup	1Q	(Cyprus) APOEL	0–0	0–3	0–3
1996–97	UEFA Cup	1Q	(Bulgaria) Lokomotiv Sofia	2–1	0–6	2–7
1997–98	Champions League	1Q	(Poland) Widzew Łódź	0–2	0–8	0–10
1999–00	UEFA Cup	1Q	(Federal Republic of Yugoslavia) Red Star Belgrade	2–3	0–1	2–4
2000–01	UEFA Cup	1Q	(Slovenia) Hit Gorica	1–0	1–3	2–3
2001–02	UEFA Cup	1Q	(Slovenia) Hit Gorica	0–0	0–1	0–1
2004–05	Champions League	1Q	(Bosnia and Herzegovina) Široki Brijeg	1–0	1–2	2–2 (a)
2004–05	Champions League	2Q	(Russia) CSKA Moscow	0–0	0–2	0–2
2005–06	Champions League	1Q	(Iceland) FH Hafnarfjarðar	2–0	2–1	4–1
2005–06	Champions League	2Q	(Belgium) Anderlecht	1–0	0–5	1–5
2007–08	UEFA Cup	1Q	(Austria) SV Ried	2–1	1–3	3–4
2008	Intertoto Cup	1R	(Slovakia) Nitra	2–0	1–3	3–3 (a)
2008	Intertoto Cup	2R	(Belgium) Germinal Beerschot	1–0	1–1	2–1
2008	Intertoto Cup	3R	(Romania) Vaslui	2–1	0–2	2–3
2011–12	Champions League	2Q	(Croatia) Dinamo Zagreb	0–0	0–3	0–3
2012–13	Champions League	2Q	(Georgia (country)) Zestaponi	3–0	2–2	5–2
2012–13	Champions League	3Q	(Israel) Ironi Kiryat Shmona	2–2	0–4	2–6
2012–13	UEFA Europa League	Play-off	(Cyprus) APOEL	1–1	3–1	4–2
2012–13	UEFA Europa League	Group H	(Serbia) Partizan	1–1	0–0	4th place
2012–13	UEFA Europa League	Group H	(Italy) Internazionale	1–3	2–2	4th place
2012–13	UEFA Europa League	Group H	(Russia) Rubin Kazan	0–1	0–1	4th place
2013–14	Champions League	2Q	(Albania) Skënderbeu	0–0	0–1	0–1 (a.e.t.)
2014–15	Europa League	2Q	(Slovenia) Koper	1–2	2–0	3–2
2014–15	Europa League	3Q	(Georgia (country)) Chikhura Sachkhere	0–0	3–2	3–2
2014–15	Europa League	Play-off	(Serbia) Partizan	1–2	2–3	3–5
2015–16	Europa League	1Q	(Montenegro) Mladost Podgorica	2–2	1–1	3–3 (a)
2016–17	Europa League	1Q	(Malta) Balzan	1–2	2–0	3–2
2016–17	Europa League	2Q	(North Macedonia) Shkëndija	0–0	0–1	0–1
2018–19	Europa League	1Q	(Hungary) Újpest	3–1	0–4	3–5
2019–20	Europa League	1Q	(Moldova) Speranța	6–0	3–0	9–0
2019–20	Europa League	2Q	(Russia) Arsenal Tula	3–0	1–0	4–0
2019–20	Europa League	3Q	(Israel) Bnei Yehuda	2–2	1–2	3–4
2020–21	Europa League	1Q	(North Macedonia) Shkupi	2–1	—N/a	—N/a
2020–21	Europa League	2Q	(Turkey) Galatasaray	1–3	—N/a	—N/a
2021–22	Champions League	1Q	(Georgia (country)) Dinamo Tbilisi	2–1	2–1	4–2
2021–22	Champions League	2Q	(Greece) Olympiacos	0–1	0–1	0–2
2021–22	Europa League	3Q	(Finland) HJK	2–2	0–3	2–5
2021–22	Europa Conference League	Play-off	(Israel) Maccabi Haifa	3–3	0–4	3–7
2022–23	Europa Conference League	2Q	(Cyprus) Aris Limassol	3–0	0–2	3–2
2022–23	Europa Conference League	3Q	(Austria) Rapid Wien	2–1	0–2	2–3 (a.e.t.)
2023–24	Europa Conference League	2Q	(Bosnia and Herzegovina) Željezničar	2–0	2–2	4–2
2023–24	Europa Conference League	3Q	(Turkey) Beşiktaş	1–3	1–2	2–5
2026–27	Conference League	2Q	(Belarus) Dinamo Minsk	2-4	1–0	3–4

== Players ==
=== Current squad ===
As of 20 October 2026

Note: Flags indicate national team as defined under FIFA eligibility rules; some limited exceptions apply. Players may hold more than one non-FIFA nationality.

No.	Pos.	Nation	Player
1	GK	AZE	Emil Balayev (vice-captain)
3	DF	AZE	Rufat Abbasov
5	DF	BRA	Igor Ribeiro
6	MF	BEN	Sessi D'Almeida
7	MF	AZE	Emil Safarov
8	MF	AZE	Emin Mahmudov (captain)
10	MF	VEN	Freddy Vargas
11	MF	HUN	Alen Skribek
14	DF	AZE	Elvin Badalov
17	DF	AZE	Murad Khachayev
18	MF	NGR	Ifeanyi Mathew
20	MF	BRA	Gustavo Klismahn

No.	Pos.	Nation	Player
22	MF	SUR	Denzel Jubitana
24	DF	ESP	Moustapha Seck
26	FW	NGR	Adeleke Akinyemi
27	MF	SRB	Dragoljub Savić
29	FW	SVK	Ľubomír Tupta
33	MF	BRA	Breno Almeida
55	DF	GLP	Andreaw Gravillon
70	MF	UKR	Andriy Shtohrin
77	DF	MLI	Falaye Sacko
88	MF	CRO	Vicko Ševelj
93	GK	AZE	Rza Jafarov
97	FW	SEN	Bassala Sambou

For recent transfers, see Transfers summer 2026.

=== Out on loan ===
Note: Flags indicate national team as defined under FIFA eligibility rules; some limited exceptions apply. Players may hold more than one non-FIFA nationality.

No.	Pos.	Nation	Player
—	FW	AZE	Aghadadash Salyanskiy (at Araz-Naxçıvan)

=== Retired numbers ===
9 – (Azerbaijan) Anatoliy Banishevskiy, striker, played for his entire career at Neftçi from 1963 to 1978 (posthumous honour). The number was retired on June 1, 2026, and the decision was announced on February 23, 2026, on the footballer's 80th birthday.

=== Reserve team ===
Neftçi-2 plays in the Azerbaijan Reserve League.

As of 15 September 2026

Note: Flags indicate national team as defined under FIFA eligibility rules; some limited exceptions apply. Players may hold more than one non-FIFA nationality.

No.	Pos.	Nation	Player
39	MF	AZE	Farhad Farhadli
42	MF	AZE	Ismayil Gurbanli
47	MF	AZE	Aliyar Hagverdizade
49	MF	AZE	Punhan Gasimzade
54	DF	AZE	Nihad Aliyev
57	MF	AZE	Mirshahbaz Shahbazov
63	MF	AZE	Altun Khanjanli
64	FW	AZE	Royal Farzullazade
67	MF	AZE	Elvin Valiyev
71	FW	AZE	Tunar Mehdiyev
73	MF	AZE	Ravan Safarli
75	DF	AZE	Kamil Hasanov

No.	Pos.	Nation	Player
76	DF	AZE	Elshan Atakishiyev
78	MF	AZE	Eljan Abilov
79	MF	AZE	Emin Suleymanov
80	DF	AZE	Aslan Shirinov
81	GK	AZE	Mahdi Hasanov
82	DF	AZE	Mahammad Mammadli
84	DF	AZE	Ali Nabizade
86	DF	AZE	Rahman Shirinov
87	MF	AZE	Vusal Karimov
91	GK	AZE	Nuraziz Azizov
94	FW	AZE	Rustam Huseynli
96	GK	AZE	Eldar Babayev
98	FW	AZE	Nijat Maharramov

== Honours ==
=== Azerbaijan ===
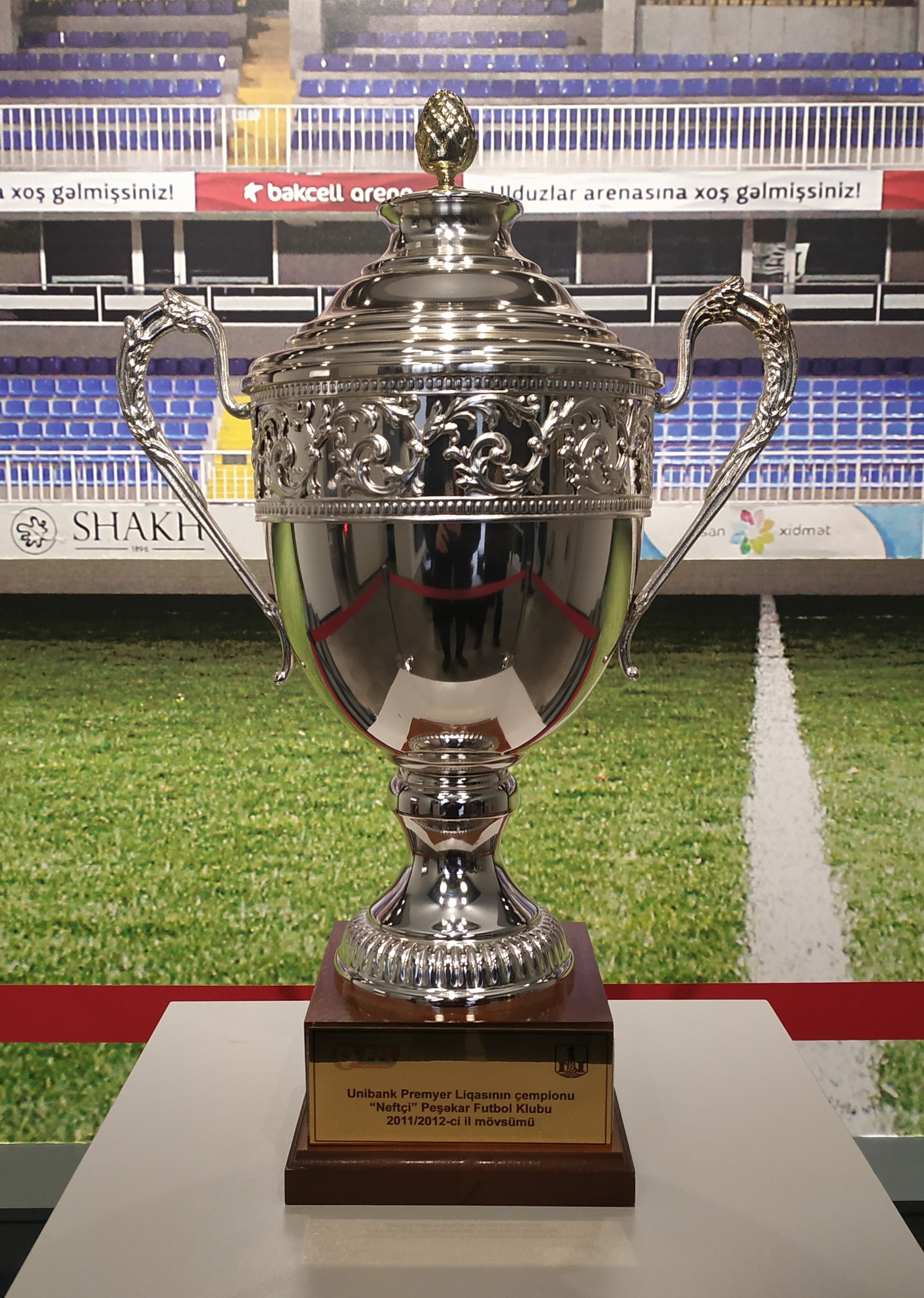
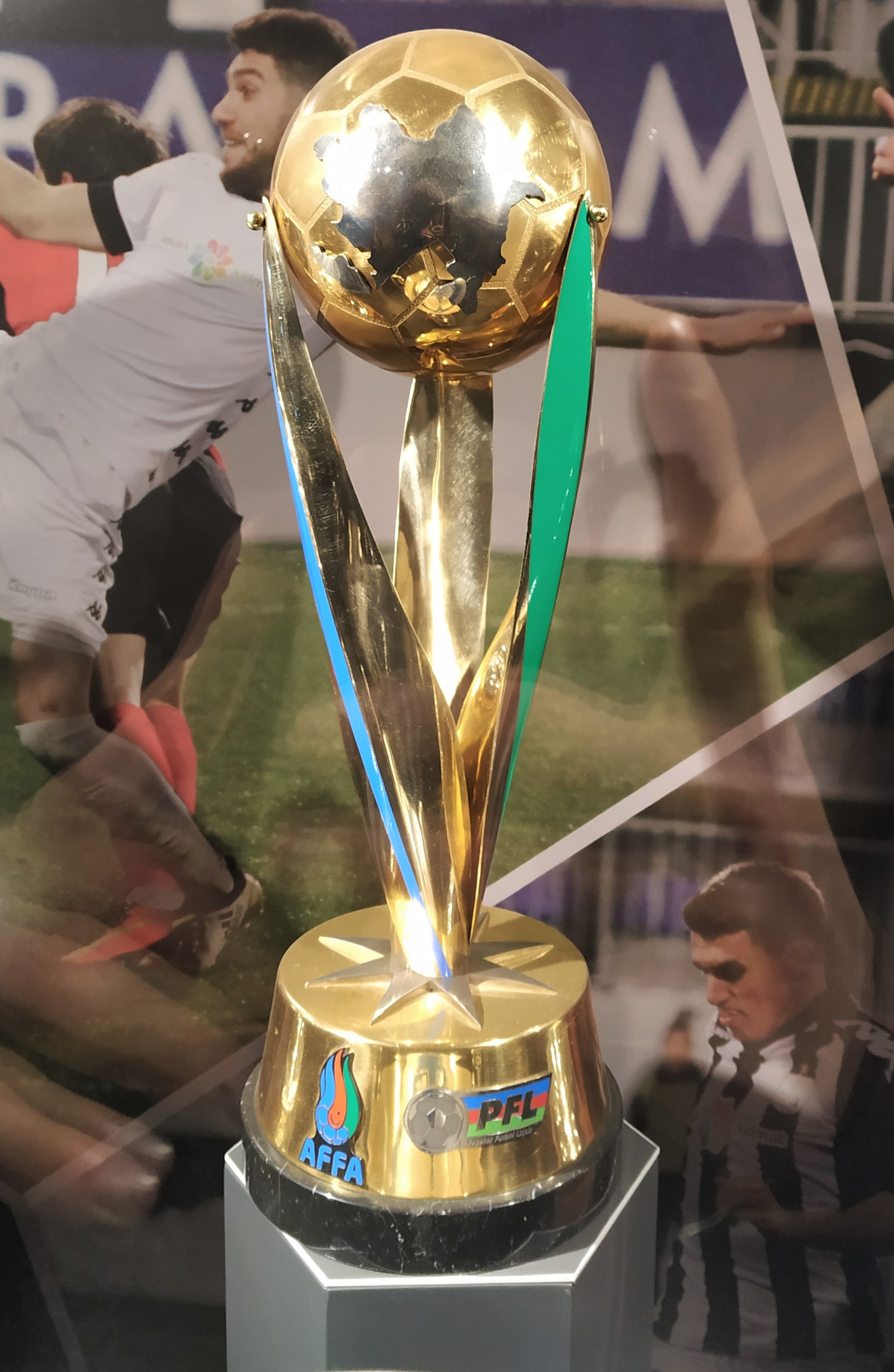
Azerbaijan Premier League (left) and Azerbaijan Cup (right) trophy in Neftçi PFK museum.
- Azerbaijan League
  - Winners (9): 1992, 1995–96, 1996–97, 2003–04, 2004–05, 2010–11, 2011–12, 2012–13, 2020–21
  - Runners-up (5): 2000–01, 2006–07, 2018–19, 2019–20, 2021–22
  - Third place (7): 1994–95, 1998–99, 1999–2000, 2005–06, 2007–08, 2017–18, 2022–23
- Azerbaijan Cup
  - Winners (6): 1994–95, 1995–96, 1998–99, 2003–04, 2012–13, 2013–14
  - Runners-up (5): 2000–01, 2011–12, 2014–15, 2015–16, 2022–23
- Azerbaijan Supercup
  - Winners (2): 1993, 1995
  - Runners-up (1): 2013

=== USSR ===
- Soviet Top League
  - Third place (1): 1966
- Soviet First League
  - Runners-up (1): 1976
  - Third place (1): 1954
- Soviet Cup
  - Semi-finalist (4): 1966–67, 1967–68, 1970, 1971
- USSR Federation Cup
  - Runners-up (1): 1988

=== European ===
- UEFA Intertoto Cup
  - Runners-up (1): 2008 (joint runners-up)

=== International ===
- Commonwealth of Independent States Cup
  - Winners (1): 2006
  - Runners-up (1): 2005

== Coaches and administration ==
Supervisory Board	Management	Coaching (senior team)	Coaching (other teams)
Head of supervisory board – Hafiz Zeynalov; Supervisory board member – Emin Amrullayev; Supervisory board member – Orkhan Sultanov; Supervisory board member – Farid Hajiyev; Supervisory board member – Emil Alkhasli; Supervisory board member – Bakhtiyar Aslanbayli; Supervisory board member – Afaq Mammadova	Sports advisor – Kamil Mammadov; Football teams and operations director – Zaur Azizov; Media director – Rustam Afsarli; Press secretary – Asef Zeynalli; Financial director – Mammad Hajiyev; A team manager – Emil Mammadov	Head coach – (Ukraine) Yuriy Vernydub; Assistant coach – (Ukraine) Valeriy Mykhaylenko; Assistant coach – (Ukraine) Dmytro Kara-Mustafa; Assistant coach – (Ukraine) Vitaliy Vernydub; Assistant coach – (Ukraine) Ihor Fokin	Neftçi-2 head coach – Rashad Abdullayev; U-19 head coach – Asif Ramazanov; U-17 head coach – Elvin Mammadov; U-16 head coach – Vagif Aliyev; U-15 head coach – Eldaniz Mammadov; U-14 head coach – Araz Gulamov; U-13 head coach – Rashad Mammadov; U-12 head coach – Khalid Bayramov; U-11 head coach – Ingilab Alakbarov; U-10 head coach – Elvin Sharifzade; U-9 head coach – Mirmehdi Rzayev; U-8 head coach – Ramil Mansurov

== Presidential history ==
Neftçi has had numerous presidents over the course of its history, some of whom have been owners of the club while others have been honorary presidents. In 1988, Neftçi had registered as a professional football club and club since then had ten presidents.

Name	Years
(Soviet Union) (Azerbaijan) Aydin Ibrahimov	1988–97
(Azerbaijan) Agil Pashayev	1997–01
(Azerbaijan) Ramiz Mirzayev	2001–03
(Azerbaijan) Rovnag Abdullayev	2004–08
(Azerbaijan) Akbar Hajiyev	2008–09
(Azerbaijan) Sadıq Sadıqov	2010–15
(Azerbaijan) Orkhan Huseynzade	2017–2018
(Azerbaijan) Kamran Guliyev	2018–2023
(Azerbaijan) Farrux Mahmudov (as CEO)	2023–2024
(Turkey) Cenk Sümer (as CEO)	2024–

== Notable managers ==
The following individuals have all won at least one trophy while coaching Neftçi:

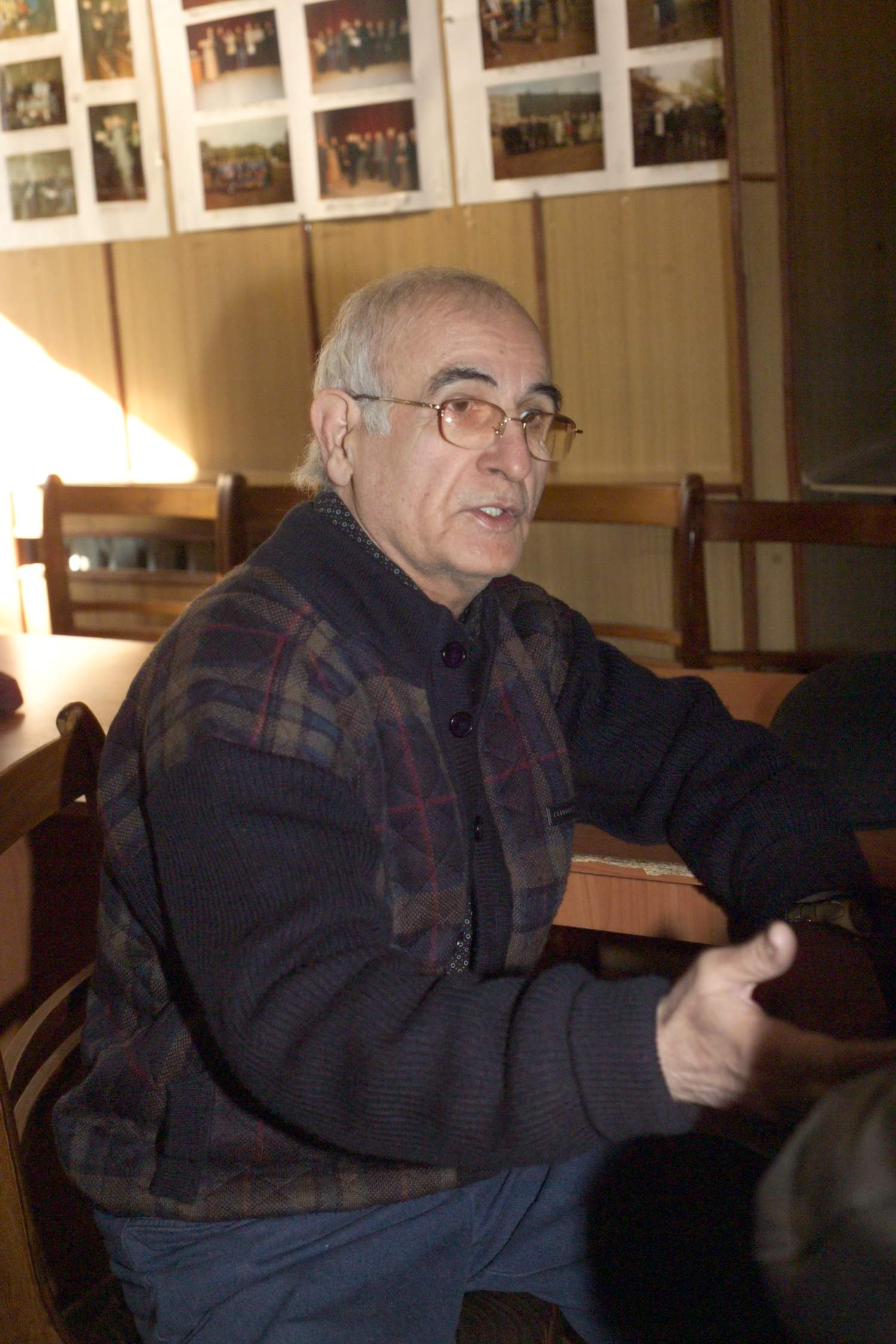
Ahmad Alaskarov is the first manager to have won the trophy for Neftçi.

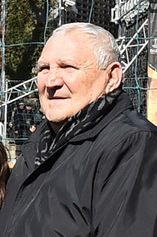
Kazbek Tuaev is the most successful Neftçi manager (5 titles in ten seasons).

Name	Period	Trophies	Refs
(Azerbaijan) Ahmad Alaskarov	1966–1970; 1979–1982; 1991–1992; 1999–2000	Azerbaijan Premier League, Azerbaijan Cup	
(Azerbaijan) Sergey Kramarenko	1993	Azerbaijan Supercup	
(Azerbaijan) Vagif Sadygov	1993–1995; 2009–2010	2 Azerbaijan Cup, 2 Azerbaijan Supercup	
(Azerbaijan) Kazbek Tuaev	1983–1984; 1991; 1996–1997; 1998; 2001-2004	3 Azerbaijan Premier Leagues, 2 Azerbaijan Cups	
(Azerbaijan) Aghasalim Mirjavadov	1987–1988; 1989; 2004-2006	Azerbaijan Premier League, CIS Cup	
(Azerbaijan) Arif Asadov	2010–2011; 2014–2015	Azerbaijan Premier League	
(Azerbaijan) Boyukagha Hajiyev	2011–2013; 2014	2 Azerbaijan Premier Leagues, 2 Azerbaijan Cups	
(Azerbaijan) Samir Abasov	2020–2022; 2024–2025	Azerbaijan Premier League	
