= Rasim Kalakula =

Albanian politician

Rasim Kalakula was an Albanian politician and mayor of Tirana from 1928 through 1930.
