= Rasim Mutuk =

Turkish politician

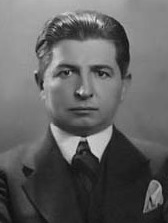

Member of the Grand National Assembly

Personal details
- Born: 1897 Tekirdağ, Ottoman Empire
- Died: 1973 (aged 75–76)

Rasim Mutuk (1897 – 1973) was a Turkish engineer and antisemitic politician, who was one of the initiators of the 1934 Thrace pogroms.
