= Azerbaijan national football team =

Men's association football team

Azerbaijan
- Nickname: Milli komanda (The National Team)
- Association: Association of Football Federations of Azerbaijan (AFFA)
- Confederation: UEFA (Europe)
- Head coach: Aykhan Abbasov
- Captain: Emin Mahmudov
- Most caps: Rashad Sadygov (111)
- Top scorer: Emin Mahmudov (16)
- Home stadium: Various
- FIFA code: AZE
First colours	Second colours	Third colours

FIFA ranking
- Current: 124 ▲3 (18 November 2026)
- Highest: 73 (July 2014)
- Lowest: 170 (June 1994)

First international
- Official; Georgia 6–3 Azerbaijan (Gurjaani, Georgia; 17 September 1992)

Biggest win
- Azerbaijan 6–1 Saint Lucia (Sumgait, Azerbaijan; 27 March 2026)

Biggest defeat
- France 10–0 Azerbaijan (Auxerre, France; 6 September 1995)

The Azerbaijan national football team (Azerbaijani: Azərbaycan milli futbol komandası) is the national football team of Azerbaijan and is controlled by the Association of Football Federations of Azerbaijan. It represents Azerbaijan in international football competitions. The majority of Azerbaijan's home matches are held at the national stadium, Baku Olympic Stadium, with friendly matches sometimes hosted at club stadiums.

The Azerbaijan national football team has taken part in qualification for each major tournament since Euro 1996 but has never qualified for the finals tournament of any World Cup or European Championships. Azerbaijan was the first Caucasus country to host a major football tournament, the UEFA Euro 2020.

== History ==
=== Early period (before the 1920s) ===
In the early twentieth century, football began to become popular in Azerbaijan, which was then part of the Russian Empire. In 1912, Azerbaijani football players had their first "international match" and they won 4–2 in Tbilisi, Georgia against the local "Sokol" team. During 1912–1913, matches between the Azerbaijani and Georgian football teams were organized, first in Tbilisi and then in Baku. In 1914, the Football Union was founded in Azerbaijan. The Football Union undertook the organization of official city championships and other competitions.

=== Soviet era (1920s–1991) ===
The oldest records of football teams in Soviet Azerbaijan go back to 1926–1927, when the Trans-Caucasian Championship was organized in Tbilisi. Three South Caucasian countries participated: Azerbaijan, Armenia, and Georgia. The Azerbaijan national football team held its first friendly matches against Georgia and Armenia in 1927 for the Trans-Caucasian Championship in Georgia. Also in 1926, football players from Azerbaijan played three matches with the Football team from Iran in Baku. In 1929, three matches were played between these teams in Tehran. In all matches, Azerbaijan players won.

The 1960s is considered the Golden Age for Azerbaijani football, as it produced great players like Anatoliy Banishevskiy, Alakbar Mammadov and the football referee Tofiq Bahramov, most famous for being the linesman who helped to award a goal for England in the 1966 World Cup Final between England and West Germany.

=== Post-independence (1992–present) ===
==== 1990s ====
After Azerbaijan gained its independence in 1991, AFFA — Association of Football Federations of Azerbaijan — was created. In 1992, renowned Azerbaijani footballer Alekper Mamedov became the first head coach of the Azerbaijani national football team, compiling a 3–1 record as coach that includes the first ever national team victory, over Georgia on 25 May 1993. The national team was accepted as a provisional member of UEFA on 2 December 1993, and later as a full member in May 1994 at the 22nd UEFA Congress in Vienna. It also joined FIFA in June 1994 at the 49th FIFA Congress in Chicago. The security issues forced the team to play all of its home UEFA Euro 1996 qualifiers in Trabzon, Turkey, after UEFA imposed a ban on home matches on 21 October 1994.

==== 2000s ====
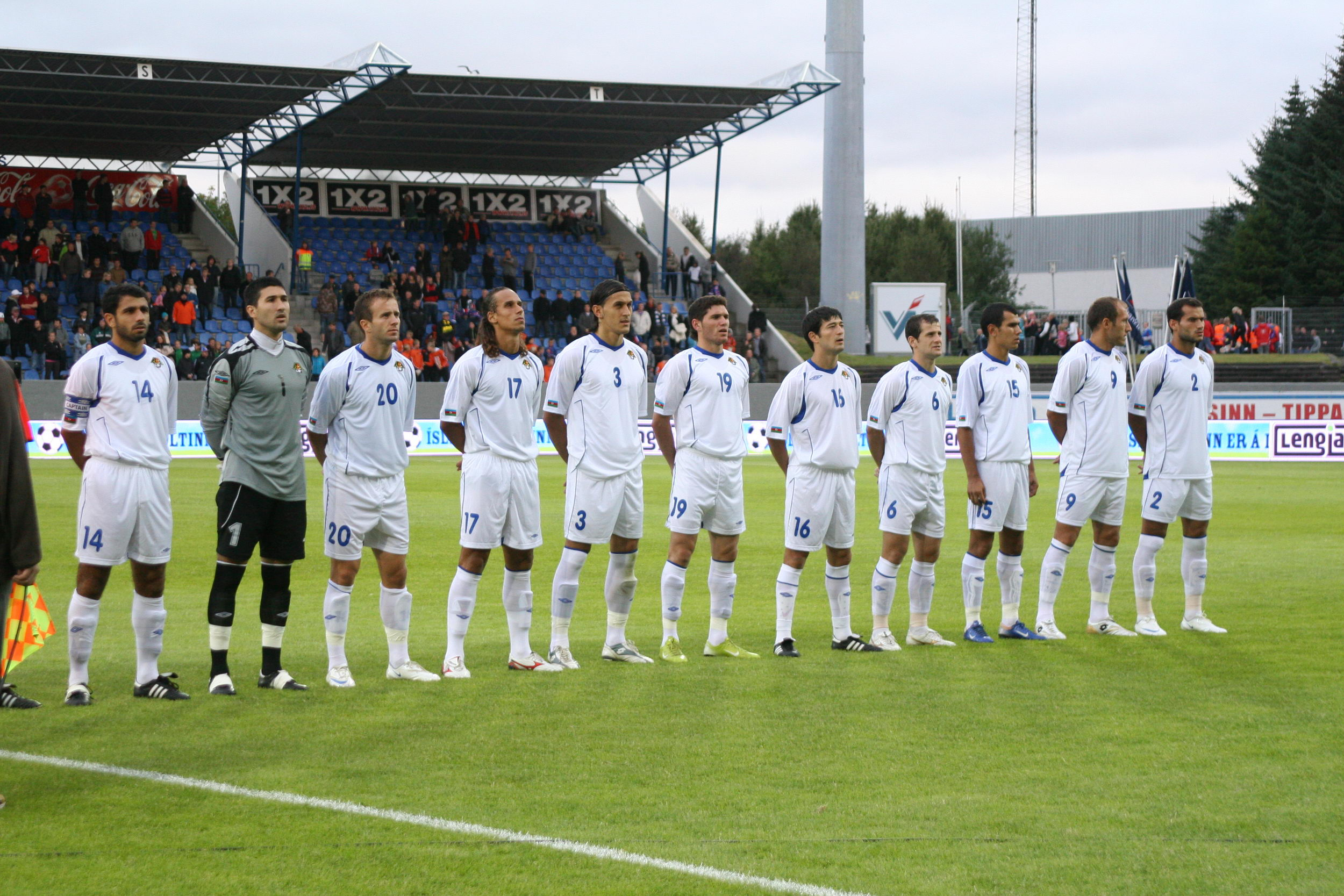
Azerbaijani squad in 2008.

As of the early 2000s, the Azerbaijani football federation started to integrate more players into the national team through FIFA's eligibility rules. In February 2004, Carlos Alberto Torres, captain of the Brazil team that won the 1970 FIFA World Cup was appointed its national coach. Despite a poor start, a 0–6 defeat to Israel on February 18, Azerbaijan won their first ever away match, 3–2 against Kazakhstan on April 28. In June 2005, following a 3–0 defeat by Poland, Torres stood down from the position, to be replaced by former Neftchi coach Vagif Sadygov, his third spell as coach of Azerbaijan. Shahin Diniyev took over as manager in November 2005. He resigned on 31 October 2007, and Gjoko Hadzievski was named as caretaker coach of Azerbaijan.

In April 2008, former German football player and coach Berti Vogts was appointed as a manager of Azerbaijan on a two-year contract. Azerbaijan had a mixed qualifying campaign, finishing with 5 points, just missing out on a last place to Liechtenstein with 2 points.

In November 2009, AFFA extended Berti Vogts' contract for a further two years, making him the first manager to manage the weak Azerbaijani national team in two qualification cycles.

==== 2010s ====
In 2010, following a shock win over Turkey, the team reached 90th place in FIFA World Rankings, Azerbaijan's highest ever position in the country's football history. After victory over Kazakhstan, Azerbaijan also broke their scoring and points records by gaining 7 points and scoring 10 goals.

In November 2011, AFFA extended Berti Vogts' contract for a further two years, until the end of the 2014 FIFA World Cup qualification cycle. Under Vogts, Azerbaijan had some poor results, not being able to defeat second-string sides. Vogts faced major criticism, protest, and demonstration from local supporters and the media. However, Azerbaijan managed to finish the qualification cycle in fourth place, the team's best ever finish. In December 2013, Vogts being granted a new two-year contract, with the aim to lead Azerbaijan through EURO 2016 qualifying. In July 2014, Azerbaijan beat its ranking record by reaching 73rd place in FIFA World Rankings. Following three straight losses, Vogts resigned from his post after spending six years in charge of Azerbaijan.

Succeeding Vogts as full-time manager was former Croatia international Robert Prosinečki. He guided the Azerbaijani team to another record points haul (10) in 2018 FIFA World Cup qualifying, but the team still finished fifth in the six-team Group C. Prosinečki resigned after deciding not to extend his contract with the Azerbaijan Football Federation and was succeeded by countryman Nikola Jurčević.

==== 2020s ====
The UEFA Euro 2020 qualifying proved to be a disaster for Azerbaijan as the team finished in bottom with a complete seven defeats, including a famous 1–5 at home against Slovakia, and only one draw, which was, surprisingly, against 2018 FIFA World Cup runners-up Croatia, the home of the manager. Nikola Jurčević departed following the poor performance of Azerbaijan. After the qualifying, Azerbaijan turned out to be the only country ever to not qualify for a tournament they co-hosted.

The qualification for the 2022 FIFA World Cup with new coach Gianni De Biasi also went horribly, with Azerbaijan getting only a single point in Group A in matches with strongholds Portugal and Serbia and secondary sides Ireland and Luxembourg. The Nations League that year was more successful. Azerbaijan was drawn into Group 3 of League C with Kazakhstan, Belarus and Slovakia. After failing to win against Kazakhstan and Slovakia and securing themselves a goalless draw against Belarus, the matches of the second leg were all wins. At the end, Azerbaijan finished second with 10 points, three points away from promoted first-place Kazakhstan. After losing three matches in the UEFA Euro 2024 qualifying and drawing once, De Biasi got sacked on 22 October 2023. The games without a manager were equal: Azerbaijan won 2 matches out of four, including a surprising 3-0 defeat of already-eliminated Sweden. The other two matches were both lost.

In March 2024, the assistant manager Arif Asadov was hired as caretaker manager. Under Asadov, the team won two out of 4 games. In June 2024, Former UEFA Euro 2016 winning coach Fernando Santos was appointed as the new manager. The 2024-25 UEFA Nations League went badly, securing only a draw against Estonia and getting relegated. Azerbaijan also failed to qualify for the 2026 FIFA World Cup, being in a group with 2022 runners-up France and Iceland and Ukraine, with the latter two failing to qualify for the 2022 edition. They only secured a single point in a 1-1 draw against Ukraine.

== Team image ==
=== Colours ===
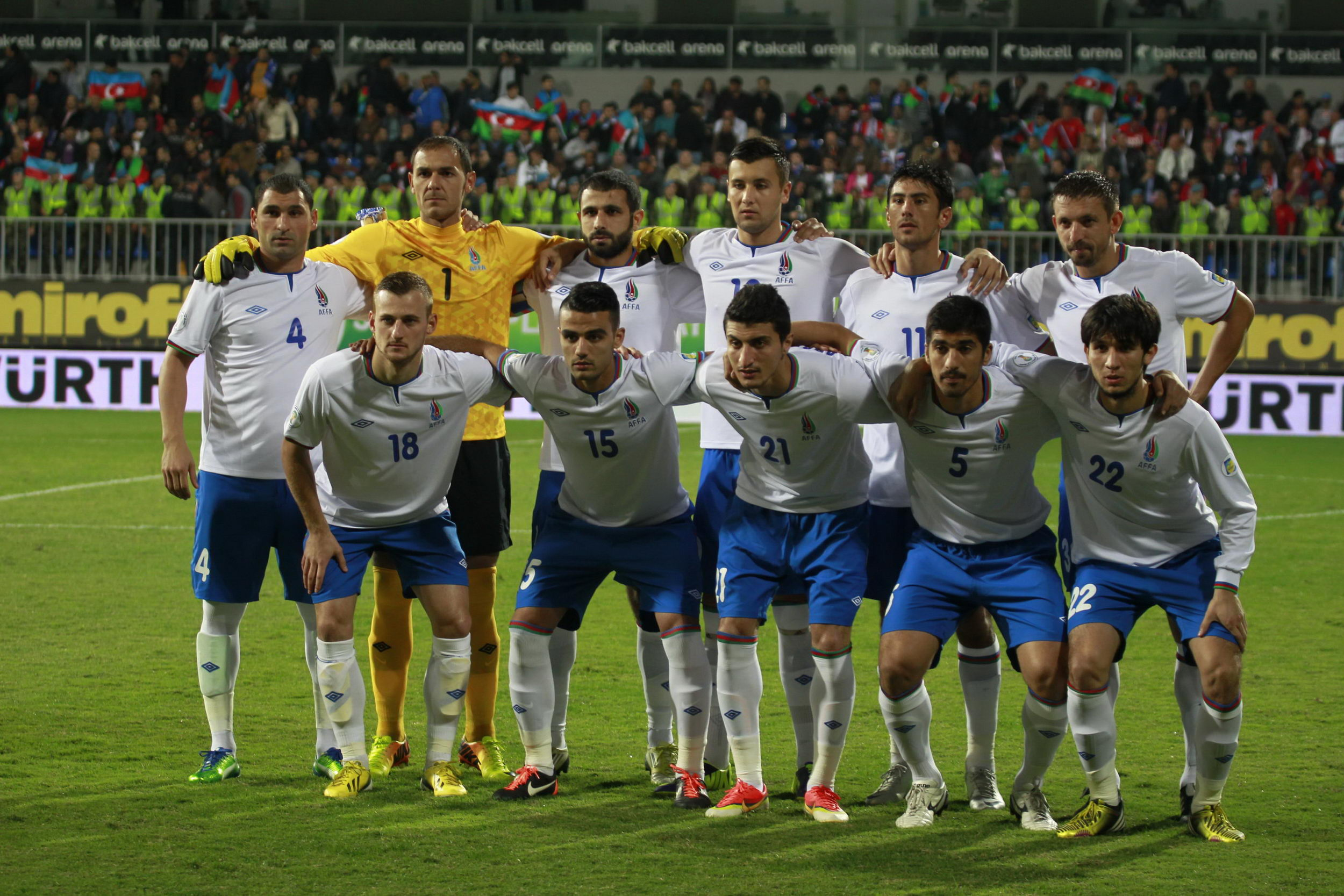
Azerbaijan national football team in October 2013.

As of UEFA Euro 2016 qualifying round, Azerbaijan's home colours are all-red kit. The team wears an all-blue kit for away games. This combination of colours is traditional for the national team since their first game. At the beginning of 90s, the team wore a white shirt, but towards the end of the decade it was transformed into blue-white striped shirts. At the beginning of the 2000s, the kit was replaced by the white shirt with a vertical tricolour stripe, formed of the colors from the national flag of Azerbaijan on the chest. The kit was changed into blue shirts, red shorts and green socks only for the UEFA Euro 2008 qualifying round. After the tournament, the national team went back to their usual combination of colours.

Azerbaijan national team's away colours were yellow-black striped shirts, black shorts and yellow socks until UEFA Euro 2004 qualifying round, when it was decided to abandon this kit in favor of the completely blue. During the UEFA Euro 2008 qualifying round games the team has used an all red kit.

Since 2017, Azerbaijan's kit have been supplied by Nike. They took over from Puma, who were Azerbaijan's kit suppliers between 2004 and 2006. Before that Umbro were Azerbaijan's kit suppliers between 2002 and 2004.

=== Nickname ===
Azerbaijan is often referred to by the media and supporters as Milli (The National), which is the nickname associated with all of Azerbaijan's international sporting teams due to the team's utilization of the country's national colors.

=== Stadium ===
Most of Azerbaijan's home matches are played at the new Baku Olympic Stadium in Baku. It has been Azerbaijan's primary home stadium ever since the move from Tofiq Bahramov Stadium in 2015. Today, some qualifying matches and friendly matches are still hosted at the Tofiq Bahramov Stadium, whereas others are hosted at the Lankaran City Stadium, Bakcell Arena and Dalga Arena after it met UEFA stadium criteria.

=== Media coverage and public relations ===
Azerbaijan's matches are presently covered by the public channel İTV. 2014 FIFA World Cup qualification match rights were held by AZTV and Idman Azerbaijan TV.

AZTV, Idman Azerbaijan TV and Lider TV are among other networks that have previously shown live fixtures.

=== Kit suppliers ===
Kit provider	Period
Adidas	1992–1994
Diadora	1995
Puma	1996–2000
Diadora	2000–2002
Umbro	2002–2004
Puma	2004–2006
Umbro	2006–2017
Nike	2017–2025
Puma	2025–

== Results and fixtures ==
The following is a list of match results in the last 12 months, as well as any future matches that have been scheduled.

Win Draw Loss Fixture

=== 2026 ===
27 March 2026 2026 FIFA Series	Azerbaijan	6–1	Saint Lucia	Sumgayit, Azerbaijan
19:10 UTC+4	Mahmudov 2' (pen.); Sadıxov 21'; Qurbanlı 37'; T. Bayramov 64'; Isgandarli 86'; R. Akhmedzade 89'	Report	Phillip 52' (pen.)	Stadium: Sumgayit City Stadium; Attendance: 1,450; Referee: Giorgi Kruashvili (Georgia)

30 March 2026 2026 FIFA Series	Azerbaijan	1–1 (9–8 p)	Sierra Leone	Sumgayit, Azerbaijan
19:00 UTC+4	R. Mammadov 72'	Report	D. Kanu 28'	Stadium: Sumgayit City Stadium; Referee: Asker Nadjafaliev (Uzbekistan)
	Penalties
	T. Bayramov (penalty scored); K. Alıyev (penalty scored); Isgandarli (penalty scored); A. Guseynov (penalty missed); Sadykhov (penalty scored); R. Akhmedzade (penalty scored); Khaybulayev (penalty scored); Kryvotsyuk (penalty scored); R. Mammadov (penalty scored); B. Guseynov (penalty scored)		(penalty missed) A. Koroma; (penalty scored) Kaikai; (penalty scored) Gandi; (penalty scored) Kamara; (penalty scored) Quee; (penalty scored) Bah; (penalty scored) Kallon; (penalty scored) Jarjue Kabia; (penalty scored) N. Jalloh; (penalty missed) Turay

5 June 2026 Friendly	Azerbaijan	0–2	Malta	Szombathely, Hungary
20:00 UTC+2		Report	J. Mbong 65'; Satariano 86'	Stadium: Haladás Sportkomplexum; Attendance: 150; Referee: Mihály Káprály (Hungary)

9 June 2026 Friendly	Azerbaijan	2–1	San Marino	Szombathely, Hungary
20:00 UTC+2	Dashdamirov 27'; Dadaşov 49'	Report	Nanni 9'	Stadium: Haladás Sportkomplexum; Attendance: 100; Referee: Márton Rúsz (Hungary)

23 September 2026 Friendly	Azerbaijan	1–0	Tajikistan	Baku, Azerbaijan
20:00 UTC+4	Baklov 58' (o.g.)	Report		Stadium: Palms Sports Arena; Referee: Roman Jitari (Moldova)

27 September 2026 2026–27 Nations League	Lithuania	1–1	Azerbaijan	Kaunas, Lithuania
16:00 UTC+3	Kučys 9' (pen.)	Report	Emreli 14'	Stadium: Darius and Girėnas Stadium; Attendance: 7,539; Referee: Menelaos Antoniou (Cyprus)

1 October 2026 2026–27 Nations League	Azerbaijan	0–0	Liechtenstein	Baku, Azerbaijan
20:00 UTC+4		Report		Stadium: Tofiq Bahramov Republican Stadium; Attendance: 4,200; Referee: Christian-Petru Ciochirca (Austria)

4 October 2026 2026–27 Nations League	Azerbaijan	1–0	Lithuania	Baku, Azerbaijan
17:00 UTC+4	Khaybulayev 25'	Report		Stadium: Neftçi Arena; Attendance: 5,000; Referee: Gustavo Correia (Portugal)

13 November 2026 2026–27 Nations League	Liechtenstein	0–1	Azerbaijan	Vaduz, Liechtenstein
20:45 UTC+1		Report	Emreli 26'	Stadium: Rheinpark Stadion; Attendance: 1,071; Referee: Kristo Tohver (Estonia)

16 November 2026 Friendly	Andorra	1–3	Azerbaijan	Encamp, Andorra
19:00 UTC+1	Fernández 55'	Report	Ahmadov 2'; Qurbanlı 47'; T. Bayramov 70' (pen.)	Stadium: Estadi de la FAF; Attendance: 485; Referee: José Luis Munuera Montero (Spain)

== Coaching staff ==
Position	Name
Head coach	(Azerbaijan) Aykhan Abbasov
Assistant coach	(Azerbaijan) Javad Mirzabayli (Azerbaijan) Elnur Chodarov
Goalkeeper coach	(Azerbaijan) Kamil Gafarov
Fitness coach	(Azerbaijan) Vusal Garayev

=== Coaching history ===
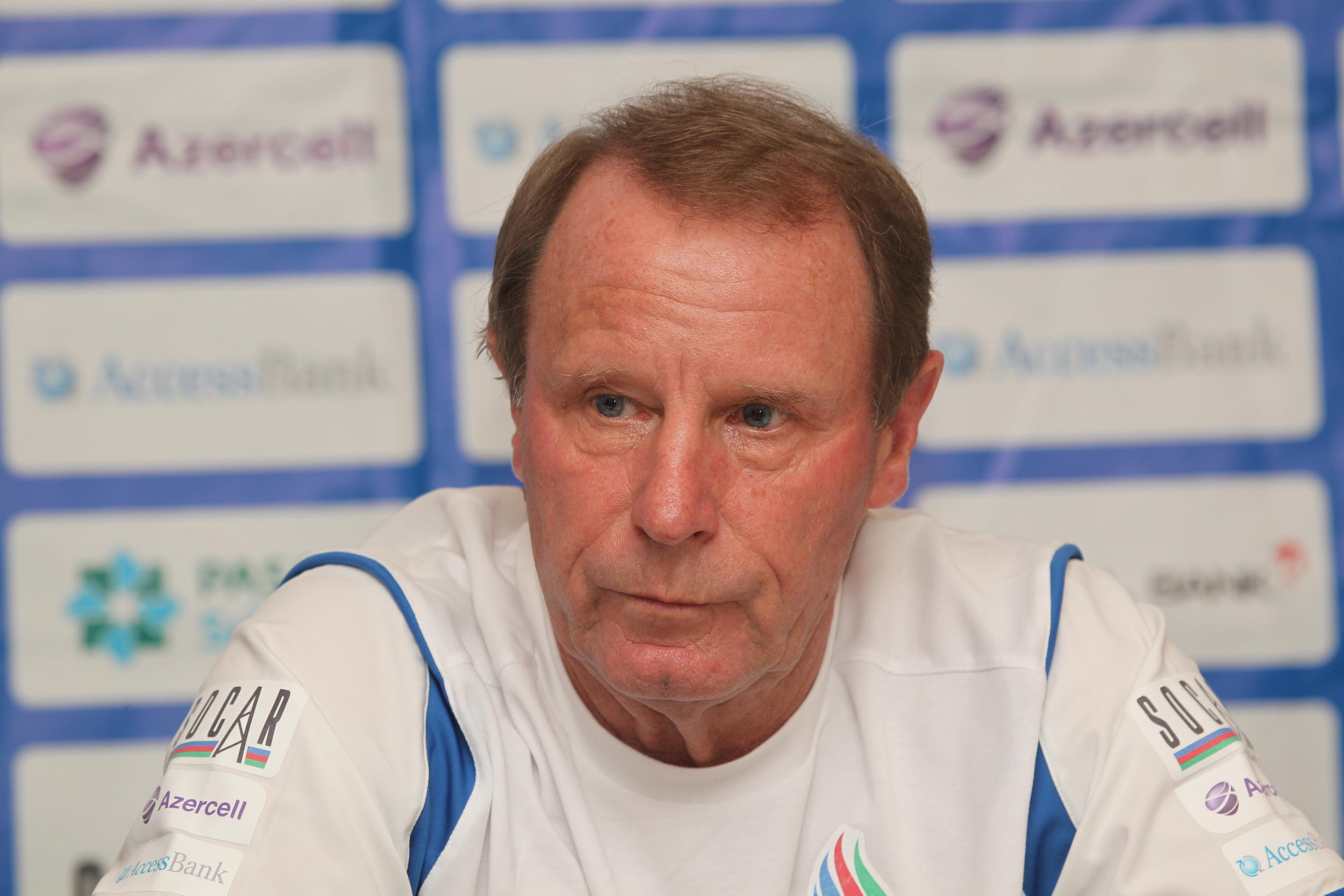
Under Berti Vogts, Azerbaijan reached its highest position ever in FIFA World Rankings

As of 16 November 2026

Manager	Azerbaijan career	Played	Won	Drawn	Lost	Win %
(Azerbaijan) Ahmad Alaskarov	17 September 1992	1	0	0	1	0.00
(Azerbaijan) Alakbar Mammadov	25 May 1993 – 8 June 1993	4	3	1	0	75.00
(Azerbaijan) Kazbek Tuayev (caretaker) (Azerbaijan) Agaselim Mirjavadov (caretaker)	19 April 1994	1	0	0	1	0.00
(Azerbaijan) Agaselim Mirjavadov	2 September 1994 – 6 September 1995	9	0	0	9	0.00
(Azerbaijan) Kazbek Tuayev	11 October 1995 – 10 November 1996	11	3	3	5	27.27
(Azerbaijan) Vagif Sadygov	1 March 1997 – 28 November 1998	20	6	3	11	30.00
(Azerbaijan) Ahmad Alaskarov	6 March 1999 – 9 October 1999	9	1	2	6	11.11
(Azerbaijan) Asgar Abdullayev (caretaker)	6 February 2000 – 4 June 2000	4	0	2	2	0.00
(Azerbaijan) Igor Ponomaryov	26 July 2000 – 7 October 2001	15	2	2	11	13.33
(Azerbaijan) Kazbek Tuayev (caretaker)	20 February 2002 – 27 March 2002	2	0	0	2	0.00
(Azerbaijan) Vagif Sadygov	17 April 2002 – 12 October 2002	8	1	4	3	12.50
(Azerbaijan) Asgar Abdullayev	20 November 2002 – 20 December 2003	9	1	2	6	11.11
(Brazil) Carlos Alberto Torres	18 February 2004 – 4 June 2005	18	2	6	10	11.11
(Azerbaijan) Vagif Sadygov (caretaker)	17 August 2005 – 12 October 2005	4	0	1	3	0.00
(Azerbaijan) Shahin Diniyev	28 February 2006 – 17 October 2007	20	4	7	9	20.00
(North Macedonia) Gjoko Hadžievski (caretaker)	17 November 2007 – 3 February 2008	3	0	1	2	0.00
(Azerbaijan) Nazim Suleymanov (caretaker)	26 March 2008	1	0	0	1	0.00
(Germany) Berti Vogts	1 June 2008 – 13 October 2014	71	15	22	34	21.13
(Azerbaijan) Mahmud Gurbanov (caretaker)	16 November 2014	1	0	0	1	0.00
(Croatia) Robert Prosinečki	3 December 2014 – 5 November 2017	23	6	6	11	26.09
(Azerbaijan) Gurban Gurbanov	30 January 2018 – 20 November 2018	12	4	5	3	33.33
(Croatia) Nikola Jurčević	11 February 2019 – 13 December 2019	10	1	2	7	10.00
(Italy) Gianni De Biasi	10 July 2020 – 22 November 2023	39	10	8	21	25.64
(Azerbaijan) Arif Asadov (caretaker)	22 March 2024 – 11 June 2024	4	2	1	1	50.00
(Portugal) Fernando Santos	12 June 2024 – 8 September 2025	11	0	2	9	0.00
(Azerbaijan) Aykhan Abbasov	8 September 2025 –	16	8	3	5	50.00

== Players ==
=== Current squad ===
The following players were called up for the 2026–27 UEFA Nations League D match against Liechtenstein and a friendly match against Andorra on 13 and 16 November.

Caps and goals correct as of 17 Novembrer, after the match against Andorra.

No.	Pos.	Player	Date of birth (age)	Caps	Goals	Club
1	GK	Emil Balayev	17 April 1994 (age 32)	20	0	(Association of Football Federations of Azerbaijan) Neftçi
12	GK	Shakhruddin Magomedaliyev	12 June 1994 (age 32)	37	0	(Association of Football Federations of Azerbaijan) Qarabağ
23	GK	Aydın Bayramov	18 February 1996 (age 30)	3	0	(Association of Football Federations of Azerbaijan) Zira
2	DF	Rahman Dashdamirov	20 October 1999 (age 27)	14	1	(Association of Football Federations of Azerbaijan) Sabah
3	DF	Rüfat Abbasov	1 January 2005 (age 21)	7	0	(Association of Football Federations of Azerbaijan) Neftçi
4	DF	Rahil Mammadov	24 November 1995 (age 30)	31	1	(Association of Football Federations of Azerbaijan) Turan Tovuz
13	DF	Eshqin Ahmadov	6 November 2005 (age 21)	1	1	(Association of Football Federations of Azerbaijan) Qabala
14	DF	Elvin Badalov	14 June 1995 (age 31)	23	0	(Association of Football Federations of Azerbaijan) Neftçi
15	DF	Badavi Guseynov	11 July 1991 (age 35)	83	1	(Association of Football Federations of Azerbaijan) Qarabağ
17	DF	Tellur Mutallimov	8 April 1995 (age 31)	15	0	(Association of Football Federations of Azerbaijan) Sabah
21	DF	Qismət Alıyev	24 October 1996 (age 30)	23	0	(Association of Football Federations of Azerbaijan) Zira
	DF	Anton Kryvotsyuk	20 August 1998 (age 28)	48	1	(Korea Football Association) Daejeon Hana Citizen
5	MF	Farid Yusifli	20 February 2002 (age 24)	2	0	(Association of Football Federations of Azerbaijan) Shafa Baku
6	MF	Abdulakh Khaybulayev	19 August 2001 (age 25)	14	0	(Association of Football Federations of Azerbaijan) Sabah
7	MF	Toral Bayramov	23 February 2001 (age 25)	48	6	(Turkish Football Federation) Bursaspor
8	MF	Emin Mahmudov	27 April 1992 (age 34)	66	16	(Association of Football Federations of Azerbaijan) Neftçi
11	MF	Khayal Aliyev	18 February 2004 (age 22)	11	0	(Association of Football Federations of Azerbaijan) Sabah
16	MF	Emil Mustafayev	24 September 2001 (age 25)	6	0	(Association of Football Federations of Azerbaijan) Sumgayit
18	MF	Oruc Mammadov	14 September 2004 (age 22)	2	0	(Association of Football Federations of Azerbaijan) Şamaxı
19	MF	Namiq Ələsgərov	3 February 1995 (age 31)	40	0	(Association of Football Federations of Azerbaijan) Kapaz
20	MF	Aleksey Isayev	9 November 1995 (age 31)	37	1	(Association of Football Federations of Azerbaijan) Sabah
24	MF	Murad Mammadov	26 April 2006 (age 20)	1	0	(Cyprus Football Association) Pafos
25	MF	Rufat Abdullazade	17 January 2001 (age 25)	4	0	(Israel Football Association) Kiryat Shmona
9	FW	Musa Qurbanlı	13 April 2002 (age 24)	27	5	(Association of Football Federations of Azerbaijan) Qarabağ
10	FW	Mahir Emreli	1 July 1997 (age 29)	67	8	(Polish Football Association) Raków Częstochowa
22	FW	Agadadash Salyanskiy	19 June 2004 (age 22)	1	0	(Association of Football Federations of Azerbaijan) Araz-Naxçıvan
26	FW	Nihad Ahmadzada	23 July 2006 (age 20)	1	0	(Association of Football Federations of Azerbaijan) Sumgayit
	FW	Lorenzo Mezzotero	16 August 2008 (age 18)	0	0	(Italian Football Federation) Sampdoria

=== Recent call-ups ===
The following players have been called up for the team within the last 12 months and are still available for selection.

Pos.	Player	Date of birth (age)	Caps	Goals	Club	Latest call-up
GK	Ravan Mirzammadov	2 August 2005 (age 21)	0	0	(Azerbaijan) Sabah	v. Lithuania, 4 October 2026
GK	Rza Jafarov	3 July 2003 (age 23)	7	0	(Azerbaijan) Neftçi	v. San Marino, 9 June 2026
GK	Səlahət Ağayev	4 January 1991 (age 35)	22	0	(Azerbaijan) Qabala	2026 FIFA Series
DF	Cəlal Hüseynov	2 January 2003 (age 23)	13	0	(Romania) Petrolul Ploiești	v. Lithuania, 4 October 2026
DF	Murad Khachayev	14 April 1998 (age 28)	4	0	(Azerbaijan) Neftçi	v. Lithuania, 4 October 2026
DF	Elvin Cafarguliyev	26 October 2000 (age 26)	37	1	(Azerbaijan) Qarabağ	v. San Marino, 9 June 2026
DF	Abdulla Rzayev	12 March 2002 (age 24)	1	0	(Azerbaijan) Şamaxı	2026 FIFA Series
MF	Anatoliy Nuriyev	20 May 1996 (age 30)	19	1	(Hungary) Kisvárda	v. Lithuania, 4 October 2026
MF	Ragim Sadykhov	18 July 1996 (age 30)	14	1	(Azerbaijan) Turan Tovuz	v. Lithuania, 4 October 2026
MF	Ceyhun Nuriyev	18 December 2001 (age 24)	14	0	(Azerbaijan) Araz-Naxçıvan	v. Lithuania, 4 October 2026
MF	Emil Safarov	30 October 2002 (age 24)	10	0	(Azerbaijan) Neftçi	v. Lithuania, 4 October 2026
MF	Aykhan Guseynov	3 September 1999 (age 27)	5	0	(Azerbaijan) Zira	v. Lithuania, 4 October 2026
MF	Edqar Adilkhanov	26 June 2005 (age 21)	2	0	(Azerbaijan) Şamaxı	v. Lithuania, 4 October 2026
MF	Mustafa Ahmadzada	12 August 2003 (age 23)	1	0	(Azerbaijan) Araz-Naxçıvan	v. Lithuania, 4 October 2026
MF	Rustam Akhmedzade	25 December 2000 (age 25)	18	1	(Azerbaijan) Sumgayit	v. San Marino, 9 June 2026
MF	Sabuhi Abdullazade	18 December 2001 (age 24)	8	0	(Azerbaijan) Sumgayit	v. San Marino, 9 June 2026
FW	Renat Dadaşov	17 May 1999 (age 27)	48	7	(Ukraine) Bukovyna Chernivtsi	v. Lithuania, 4 October 2026
MF	Vusal Isgandarli	3 November 1995 (age 31)	11	1	(Kosovo) Malisheva	v. Lithuania, 4 October 2026
FW	Nariman Akhundzade	23 April 2004 (age 22)	15	0	(Turkey) Erzurumspor	v. San Marino, 9 June 2026

== Player records ==
As of 13 November 2026
Players in bold are still active with Azerbaijan.

=== Most appearances ===
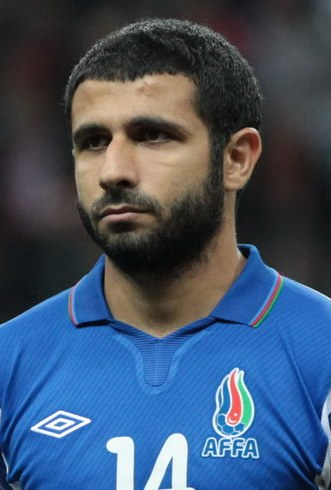
Rashad Sadygov is Azerbaijan's most capped player with 111 appearances.

Rank	Player	Caps	Goals	Career
1	Rashad Sadygov	111	5	2001–2017
2	**Badavi Guseynov**	83	1	2012–present
3	Maksim Medvedev	81	4	2009–2022
4	Aslan Kerimov	80	1	1994–2007
5	Kamran Agayev	79	0	2008–2018
6	Gara Garayev	77	0	2013–2022
7	Mahir Shukurov	76	4	2004–2014
8	Tarlan Ahmadov	75	0	1992–2005
8	Mahmud Qurbanov	75	1	1992–2008
10	Ramil Sheydayev	69	10	2016–2024

=== Top goalscorers ===
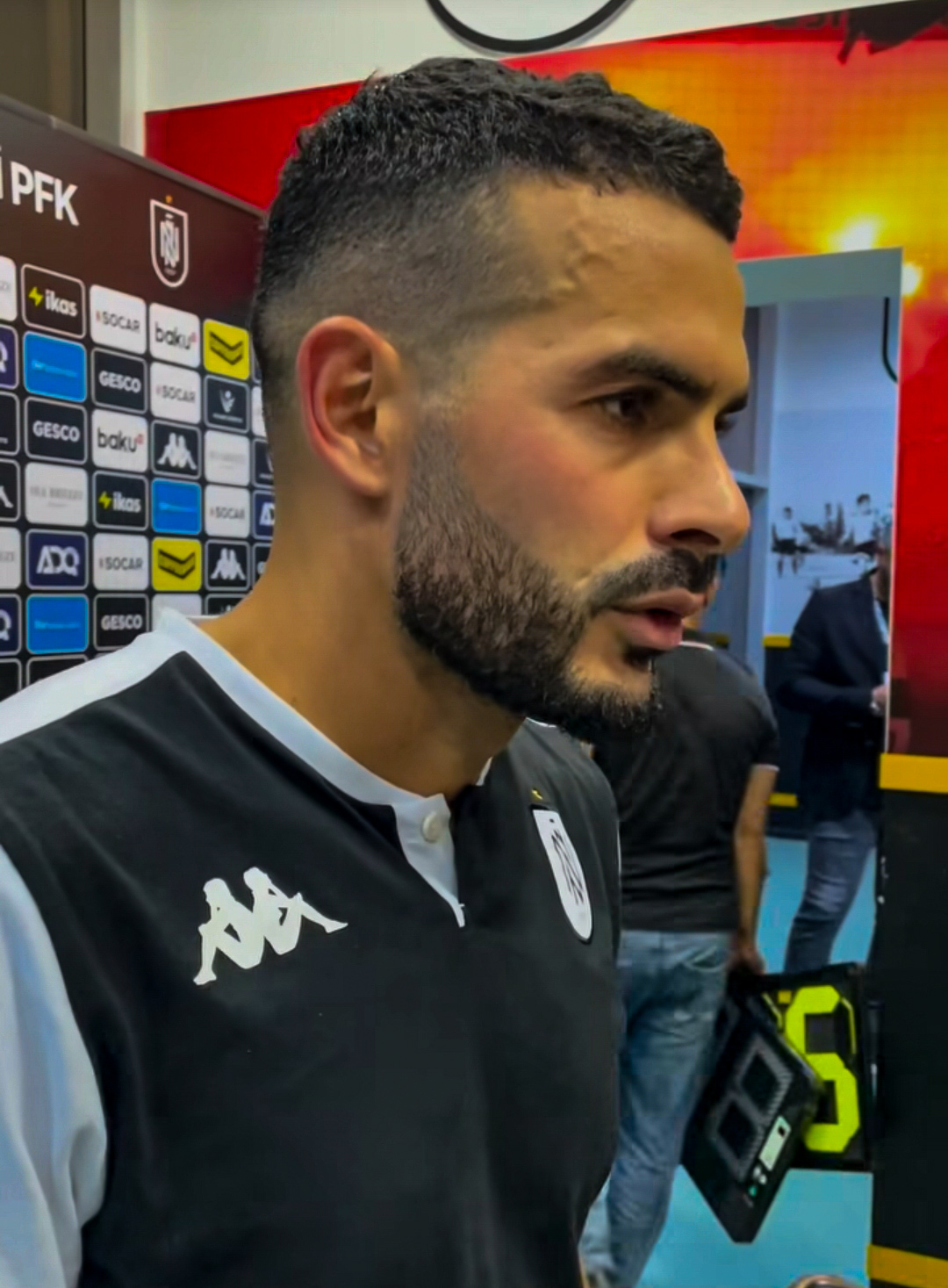
Emin Mahmudov is Azerbaijan's top scorer with 16 goals.

Rank	Player	Goals	Caps	Average	Career
1	**Emin Mahmudov**	16	66	0.24	2016–present
2	Gurban Gurbanov	14	68	0.21	1992–2005
3	Ramil Sheydayev	10	69	0.14	2016–2024
4	Vagif Javadov	9	58	0.16	2006–2014
5	**Mahir Emreli**	8	67	0.12	2017–present
6	Elvin Mammadov	7	39	0.19	2008–2017
6	Branimir Subašić	7	40	0.18	2007–2013
6	Dimitrij Nazarov	7	46	0.15	2014–2022
6	Rauf Aliyev	7	47	0.15	2010–2018
6	**Renat Dadashov**	7	48	0.15	2017–present

== Competitive record ==
=== FIFA World Cup ===
FIFA World Cup record									Qualification record						
Year	Round	Position	Pld	W	D*	L	GF	GA	Pld	W	D	L	GF	GA	Position
(Uruguay) 1930 to (Italy) 1990	Part of Soviet Union								Part of Soviet Union						
(United States) 1994	Not a FIFA member								Not a FIFA member						
(France) 1998	Did not qualify								8	1	0	7	3	22	5/5
(South Korea) (Japan) 2002	Did not qualify								10	1	2	7	4	17	6/6
(Germany) 2006	Did not qualify								10	0	3	7	1	21	6/6
(South Africa) 2010	Did not qualify								10	1	2	7	4	14	5/6
(Brazil) 2014	Did not qualify								10	1	6	3	7	11	4/6
(Russia) 2018	Did not qualify								10	3	1	6	10	19	5/6
(Qatar) 2022	Did not qualify								8	0	1	7	5	18	5/5
(Canada) (Mexico) (United States) 2026	Did not qualify								6	0	1	5	3	16	4/4
(Morocco) (Portugal) (Spain) 2030	To be determined								To be determined						
(Saudi Arabia) 2034	To be determined								To be determined						
Total		0/8							72	7	16	49	37	138	—

=== UEFA European Championship ===
UEFA European Championship record									Qualifying record						
Year	Round	Position	Pld	W	D*	L	GF	GA	Pld	W	D	L	GF	GA	Position
(France) 1960 to (West Germany) 1988	Part of Soviet Union								Part of Soviet Union						
(Sweden) 1992	Part of CIS								Part of Soviet Union						
(England) 1996	Did not qualify								10	0	1	9	2	29	6/6
(Belgium) (Netherlands) 2000	Did not qualify								10	1	1	8	6	26	5/6
(Portugal) 2004	Did not qualify								8	1	1	6	5	20	5/5
(Austria) (Switzerland) 2008	Did not qualify								12	1	2	9	6	28	8/8
(Poland) (Ukraine) 2012	Did not qualify								10	2	1	7	10	26	5/6
(France) 2016	Did not qualify								10	1	3	6	7	18	5/6
(Europe) 2020	Did not qualify								8	0	1	7	5	18	5/5
(Germany) 2024	Did not qualify								8	2	1	5	7	17	4/5
(United Kingdom) (Republic of Ireland) 2028	To be determined								To be determined						
(Italy) (Turkey) 2032	To be determined								To be determined						
Total		0/8							76	8	11	57	48	182	—

=== UEFA Nations League ===
UEFA Nations League record
Season	Division	Group	Round	Pos.	Pld	W	D	L	GF	GA	P/R	RK
2018–19	D	3	Group stage	2nd	6	2	3	1	7	6	▲	46th
2020–21	C	1	Group stage	3rd	6	1	3	2	2	4	Same position	43rd
2022–23	C	3	Group stage	2nd	6	3	1	2	7	4	Same position	38th
2024–25	C	1	Group stage	4th	6	0	1	5	3	17	▼	47th
2026–27	D	2	Group stage	1st	4	2	2	0	3	1	▲	49th
Total					28	8	10	10	22	32	38th	

== Honours ==
=== Friendly ===
- Trans-Caucasian Championship
  - Champions (2): 1926, 1927
- ECO Cup
  - Third place (1): 1993
- UAE International Cup
  - Third place (1): 2009
- FIFA Series
  - Champions (1): 2026
  - Second place (1): 2024

== See also ==
- Azerbaijan national under-23 football team
- Azerbaijan national under-21 football team
- Azerbaijan national under-20 football team
- Azerbaijan national under-19 football team
- Azerbaijan national under-18 football team
- Azerbaijan national under-17 football team
- Association of Football Federations of Azerbaijan
- Azerbaijan Premier League
