= Kazbek Tuaev =

Azerbaijani footballer and manager (born 1940)

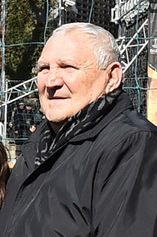

Personal information
- Full name: Kazbek Alievich Tuaev
- Date of birth: 13 November 1940 (age 85)
- Place of birth: Alyat, Azerbaijan SSR, USSR
- Height: 1.70 m (5 ft 7 in)
- Position: Forward

Youth career
- 1954–1958: Lokomotiv Baku
- 1959–1960: Spartak Nalchik

Senior career*
Years	Team	Apps	(Gls)
1961–1970	Neftchi Baku	251	(56)
1970	Spartak Orjonikidze	14	(3)
1971–1972	Neftchi Baku	26	(2)

International career^{‡}
1967	USSR	3	(0)

Managerial career
- 1970: Spartak Orjonikidze
- 1973–1977: Spartak Orjonikidze
- 1978–1982: Khazar Lankaran
- 1983–1984: Neftchi Baku
- 1987–1990: Club Africain
- 1991: Neftchi Baku
- 1992: Taraggi Baku
- 1993: Azneftyag Baku
- 1993–1995: Turan Tovuz
- 1995–1997: Azerbaijan
- 1996–1997: Neftchi Baku
- 1998: Neftchi Baku
- 2001–2004: Neftchi Baku
- * Club domestic league appearances and goals as of 8 July 2008 ‡ National team caps and goals as of 8 July 2008

Kazbek Alievich Tuaev (Kazbek Alirza oglu Tuayev, Azerbaijani: Kazbek Əlirza oğlu Tuayev, Russian: Казбе́к Али́евич Туа́ев, Kazbek Aliyevich Tuayev; born 13 November 1940 in Alyat, Azerbaijan SSR, USSR) is an Azerbaijani footballer and manager.

== Career ==
Tuaev played for Neftchi Baku as a forward from 1961 to 1972 and managed the side in the 1970s, 1980s, and 2000s. He also played for and managed Spartak Orjonikidze in the 1970s. Tuaev made his debut for USSR on 1 October 1967 in a friendly against Switzerland.

Tuaev has also managed the Azerbaijani national football team. He was classified as a Master of Sport of the USSR in 1963.
