= Anatoliy Banishevskiy =

Soviet footballer (1946–1997)

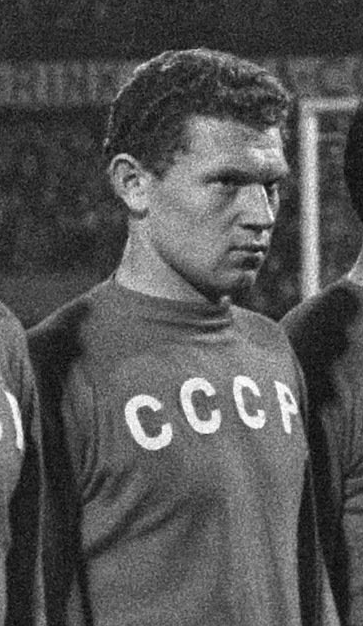
- Banishevskiy in 1967

Personal information
- Full name: Anatoliy Andreyevich Banishevskiy
- Date of birth: 23 February 1946
- Place of birth: Baku, Soviet Azerbaijan, USSR
- Date of death: 10 December 1997 (aged 51)
- Place of death: Baku, Azerbaijan
- Height: 1.74 m (5 ft 9 in)
- Position: Striker

Youth career
- Neftçi

Senior career*
Years	Team	Apps	(Gls)
1963–1978	Neftçi	288	(121)

International career
1965–1972	Soviet Union	50	(20)

Managerial career
- 1984–1987: Automobilist Mingachevir
- 1987–1988: Burkina Faso (youth)
- * Club domestic league appearances and goals

Anatoliy Andreyevich Banishevskiy (Azerbaijani: Anatoli Andreyeviç Banişevski; Russian: Анатолий Андреевич Банишевский; 23 February 1946 – 10 December 1997) was an Azerbaijani footballer who played as a forward. Throughout most of his playing and coaching career, Banishevskiy was committed to his originally domestic club, Neftçi. He is widely considered the greatest Azerbaijani footballer of all time.

He played for the Soviet Union national football team, winning 51 caps and scoring 20 goals. Banishevskiy played for the Soviet side in the 1966 FIFA World Cup, as well as in European Championship 1968 and 1972. His club team was Neftçi, and he scored 136 goals in Soviet Top League competition. The striker was unofficially named Azerbaijan's Player of the Year three times-in 1966, 1967, and 1978.

In November 2003, as part of the celebration of UEFA's Jubilee, he was selected as the Golden Player for Azerbaijan by the Association of Football Federations of Azerbaijan as the country's most outstanding player over the past 50 years.

== Early years ==
Banishevskiy was born in Baku to a family of Ukrainian descent.

He started playing football at the age of 16 and played all of his career for Neftçi, transforming into one of the best Azerbaijani players.

== Club career ==
Upon making the club's senior roster at the age of 16, Banishevskiy immediately emerged into one of the young talents of his generation. Banishevskiy maintained his status of a premier Azerbaijani player, and remained an influential football figure throughout his football profession and beyond.

== International career ==
Banishevskiy made his international debut at 19 years old on 4 July 1965 for USSR against Brazil during a friendly match. His international career ended in final of the 1972 European Championship match loss against West Germany.

== Coaching career ==
After retiring as a player, Banishevskiy briefly coached Neftçi and Automobilist Mingachevir. He has also worked as youth coach of Burkina Faso during 1987–1988 period.

== Later life and death ==
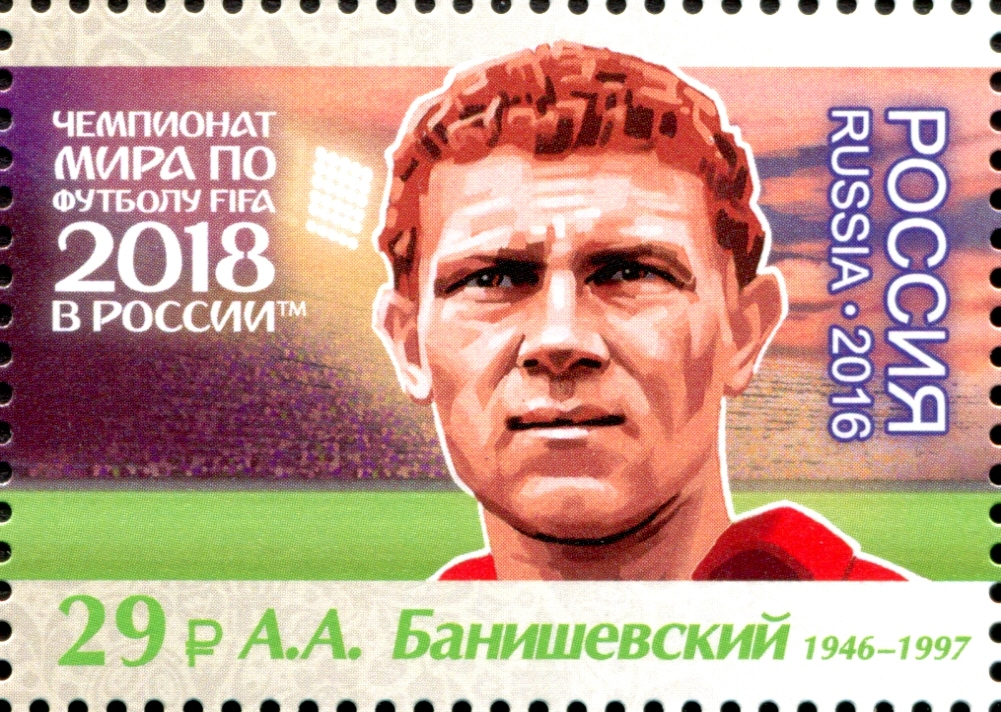
Banishevskiy on a 2016 Russian stamp from the series "Football Legends"

Banishevskiy was diagnosed with diabetic coma in 1991, having survived his first attack in 1987. He suffered cerebral atrophy as result of a second attack, which also caused him memory loss.

Subsequently, following his wife's ill-timed behavior, Banishevskiy lost the ownership of his house, which led him to live a difficult life in alcoholism on the streets of Baku. However, he was rescued from this difficult situation by his old supporter and beloved follower Saida, who cared for him in his last years of his life and ultimately married him.

On 10 December 1997, Banishevskiy died after a third diabetic coma attack, having also suffered pancreatitis.

== Personal life ==
His grandson Ali Babayev Banishevskiy began to play in the youth team of Neftçi in 2011 when he was 15. Currently, Ali plays professional football in Azerbaijan's First Division for Shusha FK.

== Honours ==
The home stadium of FK Masallı football club was renamed to Anatoliy Banishevskiy Stadium in his honor.

As a player
- USSR
  - World Cup fourth place: 1966
  - European Championship second place: 1972
  - European Championship fourth place: 1968
- Neftçi
  - Soviet Top League bronze medals: 1966

Other achievements

- Grigory Fedotov club's member: 38th with 115 goals
- List of the bests 33: 2nd (1965, 1966, 1967)
