= 2007–08 FC Inter Baku season =

Inter Baku
2007–08 season
- President: Jahangir Hajiyev
- Manager: Valentin Khodukin
- Stadium: Shafa Stadium
- Premier League: 1st
- Azerbaijan Cup: Runners up vs Khazar Lankaran
- Top goalscorer: Khagani Mammadov (19)
Home colours	Away colours

The Inter Baku 2007–08 season was Inter Baku's seventh Azerbaijan Premier League season, and their second season under manager Valentin Khodukin. They finished won the league on goal difference over Olimpik Baku and where runners-up in the Cup.

== Squad ==
Note: Flags indicate national team as defined under FIFA eligibility rules; some limited exceptions apply. Players may hold more than one non-FIFA nationality.

No.	Pos.	Nation	Player
1	GK	AZE	Jahangir Hasanzade
2	DF	AZE	Shahriyar Rahimov
4	DF	SRB	Nikola Jolović
5	DF	SRB	Milan Zagorac
6	DF	RUS	Aliyar Ismailov
7	FW	AZE	Ramin Nasibov
8	MF	AZE	Nizami Hajiyev
9	DF	AZE	Samir Abbasov
10	MF	AZE	Emin Imamaliev
12	DF	AZE	Khayal Mustafayev
13	MF	CZE	Bronislav Červenka
14	DF	AZE	Ramil Ağayev
15	DF	AZE	Volodimir Levin

No.	Pos.	Nation	Player
16	MF	LTU	Tomas Ražanauskas
17	MF	AZE	Mahmud Qurbanov
18	DF	SRB	Goran Arnaut
19	DF	AZE	Ruslan Abbasov
20	FW	AZE	Khagani Mammadov
22	FW	URU	Walter Guglielmone
23	FW	BUL	Georgi Vladimirov
42	GK	AZE	Elxan Həsənov
—	GK	AZE	Vaqif Şirinbəyov
—	MF	BUL	Petar Zlatinov
—	MF	AZE	Elvin Mammadov
—	FW	AZE	Javid Huseynov
—	FW	URU	Román Cuello

== Transfers ==
=== Summer ===
In: Note: Flags indicate national team as defined under FIFA eligibility rules; some limited exceptions apply. Players may hold more than one non-FIFA nationality.

No.	Pos.	Nation	Player
1	GK	AZE	Jahangir Hasanzade (from (Azerbaijan) Qarabağ)
9	DF	AZE	Samir Abbasov (from (Azerbaijan) Qarabağ)
13	MF	CZE	Bronislav Červenka (from (Czech Republic) Fastav Zlín)
17	DF	AZE	Mahmud Qurbanov (from (Azerbaijan) Khazar Lankaran)
18	MF	SRB	Goran Arnaut (from (Slovenia) Primorje)
19	DF	AZE	Ruslan Abbasov (from (Azerbaijan) Neftchi Baku)
20	FW	AZE	Khagani Mammadov (from (Azerbaijan) Olimpik Baku)
22	FW	URU	Walter Guglielmone (from (Uruguay) Liverpool de Montevideo)
23	FW	BUL	Georgi Vladimirov (from (Bulgaria) Cherno More)
25	DF	AZE	Mahir Shukurov (from (Azerbaijan) Neftchi Baku)
42	GK	AZE	Elxan Həsənov (from (Azerbaijan) Karvan)
—	GK	AZE	Vaqif Sjirinbäjov (from (Azerbaijan) Olimpik Baku)

Out: Note: Flags indicate national team as defined under FIFA eligibility rules; some limited exceptions apply. Players may hold more than one non-FIFA nationality.

No.	Pos.	Nation	Player
—	GK	AZE	Farhad Veliyev (to (Azerbaijan) Qarabağ)
—	GK	AZE	Elshan Poladov (to (Azerbaijan) Olimpik Baku)
—	GK	UKR	Oleg Ostapenko (to (Ukraine) Kryvbas Kryvyi Rih)
—	DF	AZE	Aykhan Abbasov (to (Azerbaijan) Qarabağ)
—	DF	AZE	Ruslan Poladov (to (Azerbaijan) MKT Araz)
—	DF	NGR	Tony Alegbe (loan return to (Ukraine) Karpaty Lviv)
—	MF	AZE	Elmar Bakhshiev (to (Azerbaijan) Khazar Lankaran)
—	MF	AZE	Ismayil Mammadov (to (Azerbaijan) Standard Baku)
—	MF	AZE	Vyacheslav Lychkin (to (Azerbaijan) Simurq)
—	MF	UKR	Sergey Chernyak (Retired)
—	FW	LTU	Valdas Trakys (to (Lithuania) Ekranas)
—	FW	BIH	Tomislav Stanić (to (Azerbaijan) Gänclärbirliyi Sumqayit)

=== Winter ===
In: Note: Flags indicate national team as defined under FIFA eligibility rules; some limited exceptions apply. Players may hold more than one non-FIFA nationality.

No.	Pos.	Nation	Player
—	MF	BUL	Petar Zlatinov (from (Bulgaria) Litex Lovech)
—	FW	AZE	Elvin Mammadov (from (Azerbaijan) Turan Tovuz)
—	FW	AZE	Javid Huseynov (from (Azerbaijan) Olimpik Baku)
—	FW	URU	Román Cuello (from (Chile) Deportes Melipilla)

Out: Note: Flags indicate national team as defined under FIFA eligibility rules; some limited exceptions apply. Players may hold more than one non-FIFA nationality.

No.	Pos.	Nation	Player
11	FW	LTU	Andrius Gedgaudas (to (Lithuania) Banga Gargždai)
25	DF	AZE	Mahir Shukurov (to (Azerbaijan) Khazar Lankaran)

== Competitions ==
=== Azerbaijan Premier League ===
==== Results ====
11 August 2007 1	Inter Baku	3 – 0	Masallı	Baku
17:00 AZST (UTC+5)	K.Mammadov 21'; Imamaliev 48'; Hajiyev 90'	Summary		Stadium: Zabrat Stadium

18 August 2007 2	Inter Baku	1 – 1	Standard Baku	Baku
17:00 AZST (UTC+5)	Hajiyev 87'	Summary	Martínez 73'	Stadium: Zabrat Stadium

25 August 2007 3	Baku	0 – 0	Inter Baku	Baku
19:00 AZST (UTC+5)		Summary		Stadium: Tofig Bakhramov Stadium

2 September 2007 4	Inter Baku	0 – 0	Neftchi Baku	Baku
18:00 AZST (UTC+5)		Summary		Stadium: Zabrat Stadium

16 September 2007 5	Olimpik Baku	1 – 0	Inter Baku	Baku
18:00 AZST (UTC+5)	Junivan 59'	Summary		Stadium: Shafa Stadium

22 September 2007 6	Inter Baku	2 – 0	Simurq	Baku
17:00 AZST (UTC+5)	Hajiyev; Gedgaudas	Summary		Stadium: Zabrat Stadium

29 September 2007 7	Karvan	0 – 3	Inter Baku	Yevlakh
18:00 AZST (UTC+5)		Summary	Qurbanov 45', 69'; K.Mammadov 80'	Stadium: Yevlakh Stadium

6 October 2007 8	Inter Baku	2 – 2	Khazar Lankaran	Baku
15:00 AZST (UTC+5)	Imamaliev 37'; Zagorac 87'	Summary	Abdullayev 16'; N'Tiamoah 55'	Stadium: Zabrat Stadium

28 October 2007 9	Inter Baku	1 – 0	Qarabağ	baku
20:25 AZST (UTC+5)	K.Mammadov 87'	Summary		Stadium: Shafa Stadium

3 November 2007 10	Inter Baku	4 – 0	ABN Bärdä	Baku
15:00 AZT (UTC+4)	K.Mammadov 24', 35'; Guglielmone 63', 76'	Summary		Stadium: Zabrat Stadium

10 November 2007 11	Turan Tovuz	0 – 4	Inter Baku	Tovuz
15:00 AZT (UTC+4)		Summary	Guglielmone 6'; K.Mammadov 11', 33', 69'	Stadium: Tovuz City Stadium

25 November 2007 12	Inter Baku	3 – 0	Gänclärbirliyi Sumqayit	Baku
15:00 AZT (UTC+4)	Guglielmone 8', 51'; Ražanauskas 59'	Summary		Stadium: Zabrat Stadium

2 December 2007 13	Gabala	2 – 1	Inter Baku	Qabala
15:00 AZT (UTC+4)	Balamestny 12', 46'	Summary	Hajiyev 63'	Stadium: Gabala City Stadium

16 February 2008 14	Masallı	0 – 3	Inter Baku	Masally
15:00 AZT (UTC+4)		Summary	K.Mammadov 37'; E.Mammadov 73'; Imamaliev 83'	Stadium: Anatoly Banishevski Stadium

24 February 2008 15	Standard Baku	1 – 2	Inter Baku	Baku
15:00 AZT (UTC+4)	Leonardo	Summary	K.Mammadov 30' (pen.), 41'	Stadium: Shafa Stadium

1 March 2008 16	Inter Baku	1 – 0	Baku	Baku
15:00 AZT (UTC+4)	Zlatinov 90'	Summary		Stadium: Zabrat Stadium

15 March 2008 17	Neftchi Baku	2 – 0	Inter Baku	Baku
17:15 AZT (UTC+4)	Kruglov 27'; Subašić 79'	Summary		Stadium: Tofik Bakhramov Stadium

29 March 2008 18	Simurq	3 – 4	Inter Baku	Zaqatala
16:00 AZT (UTC+4)	R.Kaçur 8'; Bolkvadze 30'; K.Çxetiani 85'	Summary	Imamaliev 15'; Cuello 49'; K.Mammadov 67'; Vladimirov 72'	Stadium: Zaqatala City Stadium

6 April 2008 19	Inter Baku	3 – 1	Karvan	Baku
16:00 AZST (UTC+5)	K.Mammadov 38' (pen.), 53'; Guglielmone 45'	Summary	Akhalkatsi 45'	Stadium: Zabrat Stadium

13 April 2008 20	Khazar Lankaran	3 – 1	Inter Baku	Lankaran
18:00 AZST (UTC+5)	Amirguliev 45'; Mario Sergio 70'; Abdullayev 80'	Summary	Guglielmone 14'	Stadium: Lankaran City Stadium

19 April 2008 21	Inter Baku	1 – 0	Qarabağ	Baku
16:00 AZST (UTC+5)	Qurbanov 10'	Summary		Stadium: Shafa Stadium

28 April 2008 22	Inter Baku	2 – 0	Olimpik Baku	Baku
17:00 AZST (UTC+5)	Mammadov 29'; Zlatinov 90'	Summary		Stadium: Zabrat Stadium

3 May 2008 23	ABN Bärdä	1 – 4	Inter Baku	Barda
17:00 AZST (UTC+5)	Alekperov 89'	Summary	Guglielmone 5', 47'; Zlatinov 10'; K.Mammadov 30'	Stadium: Barda City Stadium

11 May 2008 24	Inter Baku	3 – 1	Turan Tovuz	Baku
17:00 AZST (UTC+5)	K.Mammadov 33'; Guglielmone 55'; Huseynov 71'	Summary	J.Abbasov 88'	Stadium: Zabrat Stadium

18 May 2008 25	Gänclärbirliyi Sumqayit	0 – 3	Inter Baku	Sumqayit
17:00 AZST (UTC+5)		Summary	Guglielmone 5'; Mammadov 17' (pen.); Vladimirov 90'	Stadium: Mehdi Huseynzade Stadium

28 May 2008 26	Inter Baku	4 – 0	Gabala	Baku
20:00 AZST (UTC+5)	Cuello 22'; K.Mammadov 35'; Qurbanov 44'; Zlatinov 77'	Summary		Stadium: Zabrat Stadium

==== Table ====
Pos	Team	Pld	W	D	L	GF	GA	GD	Pts	Qualification or relegation
1	Inter Baku (C)	26	18	4	4	55	18	+37	58	Qualification for Champions League first qualifying round
2	Olimpik Baku	26	17	7	2	29	7	+22	58	Qualification for UEFA Cup first qualifying round (Note: Khazar Lankaran qualified for the first qualifiying round of the 1st qualifying round of the UEFA Cup as winners of the 2007–08 Azerbaijan Cup.)
3	Neftçi Baku	26	16	7	3	42	18	+24	55	Qualification for Intertoto Cup first round
4	Khazar Lankaran	26	14	10	2	44	16	+28	52	Qualification for UEFA Cup first qualifying round
5	Qarabağ	26	11	8	7	25	16	+9	41	

Source: Azerbaijan Professional Football league
Rules for classification: 1) points; 2) goal difference; 3) number of goals scored.
(C) Champions

=== Azerbaijan Cup ===
26 September 2007 1st Round 1st Leg	GEN Baku	1 – 3	Inter Baku	Baku
		[ Summary]

3 October 2007 1st Round 2nd Leg	Inter Baku	5 – 0 (8 – 1 agg.)	GEN Baku	Baku
		[ Summary]		Stadium: Zabrat Stadium

24 October 2007 Round of 16 1st Leg	Masallı	0 – 2	Inter Baku	Masallı
		Summary	Hajiyev 44'; K.Mammadov 61'	Stadium: Anatoliy Banishevskiy Stadium

31 October 2007 Round of 16 2nd Leg	Inter Baku	3 – 2 (5 – 2 agg.)	Masallı	Baku
	Guglielmone 23'; Levin 46'; Vladimirov 79'	Summary	A.Vəliyev 27'; F.Aliyev 72'	Stadium: Zabrat Stadium

3 March 2008 Quarterfinals 1st Leg	Inter Baku	2 – 2	Qarabağ	Baku
15:00 AZT (UTC+4)	Cuello 45', 73'	Summary	Aliyev 63', 87'	Stadium: Zabrat Stadium

19 March 2008 Quarterfinals 2nd Leg	Qarabağ	0 – 1 (2 – 3 agg.)	Inter Baku	Baku
17:00 AZT (UTC+4)		Summary	Goal	Stadium: Tofig Bakhramov Stadium^{1}

9 April 2008 Semifinals 1st leg	Neftchi Baku	2 – 2	Inter Baku	Baku
17:00 AZST (UTC+5)	Goal	Summary	Goal	Stadium: Tofik Bakhramov Stadium

23 April 2008 Semifinals 2nd leg	Inter Baku	1 – 0 (3 – 2 agg.)	Neftchi Baku	Baku
17:00 AZST (UTC+5)	Huseynov 57'	Summary		Stadium: Shafa Stadium

==== Final ====
24 May 2008	Khazar Lankaran	2 – 0 (a.e.t.)	Inter Baku	Baku
AZST (UTC+5)	Juninho 115', 118'	[ Summary]		Stadium: Tofiq Bahramov Stadium; Attendance: 18,000

== Squad statistics ==
=== Appearances and goals ===
No.	Pos	Nat	Player	Total		Premier League		Azerbaijan Cup	
No.	Pos	Nat	Player	Apps	Goals	Apps	Goals	Apps	Goals
1	GK	(Azerbaijan) AZE	Jahangir Hasanzade	6	0	6	0	0	0
2	DF	(Azerbaijan) AZE	Shahriyar Rahimov	1	0	1	0	0	0
4	DF	(Serbia) SRB	Nikola Jolović	1	0	1	0	0	0
5	DF	(Serbia) SRB	Milan Zagorac	17	1	17	1	0	0
6	DF	(Russia) RUS	Aliyar Ismailov	23	0	23	0	0	0
7	FW	(Azerbaijan) AZE	Ramin Nasibov	5	0	5	0	0	0
8	MF	(Azerbaijan) AZE	Nizami Hajiyev	14	4	14	4	0	0
10	MF	(Azerbaijan) AZE	Emin Imamaliev	19	4	19	4	0	0
12	DF	(Azerbaijan) AZE	Khayal Mustafayev	8	0	8	0	0	0
13	MF	(Czech Republic) CZE	Bronislav Červenka	17	0	17	0	0	0
14	DF	(Azerbaijan) AZE	Ramil Ağayev	2	0	2	0	0	0
15	DF	(Azerbaijan) AZE	Volodimir Levin	12	0	12	0	0	0
16	MF	(Lithuania) LTU	Tomas Ražanauskas	14	1	14	1	0	0
17	MF	(Azerbaijan) AZE	Mahmud Qurbanov	23	4	23	4	0	0
18	MF	(Serbia) SRB	Goran Arnaut	22	0	22	0	0	0
19	DF	(Azerbaijan) AZE	Ruslan Abbasov	16	0	16	0	0	0
20	FW	(Azerbaijan) AZE	Khagani Mammadov	23	19	23	19	0	0
21	FW	(Azerbaijan) AZE	Daniel Akhtyamov	3	0	3	0	0	0
22	FW	(Uruguay) URU	Walter Guglielmone	20	11	20	11	0	0
23	FW	(Bulgaria) BUL	Georgi Vladimirov	11	2	11	2	0	0
42	GK	(Azerbaijan) AZE	Elxan Həsənov	2	0	2	0	0	0
72	GK	(Bulgaria) BUL	Svilen Simeonov	18	0	18	0	0	0
	DF	(Azerbaijan) AZE	Mixail Kitelman	7	0	7	0	0	0
	MF	(Bulgaria) BUL	Petar Zlatinov	10	4	10	4	0	0
	MF	(Azerbaijan) AZE	Elvin Mammadov	9	1	9	1	0	0
	FW	(Uruguay) URU	Román Cuello	9	2	9	2	0	0
	FW	(Azerbaijan) AZE	Javid Huseynov	6	1	6	1	0	0
Players who appeared for Inter Baku and left during the season:
11	FW	(Lithuania) LTU	Andrius Gedgaudas	8	1	8	1	0	0
25	DF	(Azerbaijan) AZE	Mahir Shukurov	12	0	12	0	0	0

=== Goal scorers ===
Place	Position	Nation	Number	Name	Premier League	Azerbaijan Cup	Total
1	FW	(Azerbaijan)	20	Khagani Mammadov	19	1	20
2	FW	(Uruguay)	22	Walter Guglielmone	11	1	12
3	MF	(Azerbaijan)	8	Nizami Hajiyev	4	1	5
4	MF	(Azerbaijan)	17	Mahmud Qurbanov	4	0	4
4	MF	(Azerbaijan)	10	Emin Imamaliev	4	0	4
4	MF	(Bulgaria)		Petar Zlatinov	4	0	4
4	FW	(Uruguay)		Román Cuello	2	2	4
8	FW	(Bulgaria)	23	Georgi Vladimirov	2	1	3
9	FW	(Azerbaijan)		Javid Huseynov	1	1	2
10	DF	(Serbia)	5	Milan Zagorac	1	0	1
10	MF	(Lithuania)	16	Tomas Ražanauskas	1	0	1
10	MF	(Azerbaijan)		Elvin Mammadov	1	0	1
10	FW	(Lithuania)	11	Andrius Gedgaudas	1	0	1
10	DF	(Azerbaijan)	15	Volodimir Levin	0	1	1
				Unknown	0	11	11
				TOTALS	55	19	74

== Notes ==
- Qarabağ have played their home games at the Tofiq Bahramov Stadium since 1993 due to the ongoing situation in Quzanlı.
