= 2006–07 FC Inter Baku season =

Inter Baku
2006–07 season
- President: Jahangir Hajiyev
- Manager: Valentin Khodukin
- Stadium: Shafa Stadium
- Premier League: 4th
- Azerbaijan Cup: Semi-final vs Khazar Lankaran
- Top goalscorer: Samir Aliyev (6)
Home colours	Away colours

The Inter Baku 2006–07 season was Inter Baku's sixth Azerbaijan Premier League season, and their first season under manager Valentin Khodukin. They finished 4th in the league and were knocked out of the Azerbaijan Cup at the Semi-Final stage by Khazar Lankaran.

== Squad ==
Note: Flags indicate national team as defined under FIFA eligibility rules; some limited exceptions apply. Players may hold more than one non-FIFA nationality.

No.	Pos.	Nation	Player
—	GK	AZE	Elshan Poladov
—	GK	AZE	Farhad Veliyev
—	DF	AZE	Aykhan Abbasov
—	DF	NGR	Tony Alegbe (loan from Karpaty Lviv)
—	DF	AZE	Zaur Hashimov
—	DF	SRB	Nikola Jolović
—	DF	AZE	Volodimir Levin
—	DF	AZE	Khayal Mustafayev
—	DF	AZE	Mikayil Namazov
—	DF	AZE	Ruslan Poladov
—	DF	SRB	Milan Zagorac
—	MF	AZE	Elmar Bakhshiev

No.	Pos.	Nation	Player
—	MF	UKR	Serhiy Chernyak
—	MF	LTU	Andrius Gedgaudas
—	MF	AZE	Emin Imamaliev
—	MF	AZE	Aliyar Ismailov
—	MF	AZE	Vyacheslav Lychkin
—	MF	AZE	Ismayil Mammadov
—	MF	LTU	Tomas Ražanauskas
—	FW	AZE	Daniel Akhtyamov
—	FW	AZE	Samir Aliyev
—	FW	AZE	Elshan Mammadov
—	FW	BIH	Tomislav Stanić
—	FW	LTU	Valdas Trakys

== Transfers ==
=== Summer ===
In: Note: Flags indicate national team as defined under FIFA eligibility rules; some limited exceptions apply. Players may hold more than one non-FIFA nationality.

No.	Pos.	Nation	Player
—	DF	AZE	Aykhan Abbasov (from (Azerbaijan) MKT-Araz)
—	DF	NGR	Tony Alegbe (loan from (Ukraine) Karpaty Lviv)
—	MF	LTU	Tomas Ražanauskas (from (Lithuania) FC Vilnius)
—	MF	AZE	Ismayil Mammadov (from (Azerbaijan) FK Karvan)
—	MF	AZE	Yuri Muzika (from (Azerbaijan) FK Karvan)
—	MF	AZE	Emin Imamaliev (from (Azerbaijan) FK Baku)
—	FW	AZE	Daniel Akhtyamov (from (Azerbaijan) Olimpik Baku)

Out: Note: Flags indicate national team as defined under FIFA eligibility rules; some limited exceptions apply. Players may hold more than one non-FIFA nationality.

No.	Pos.	Nation	Player
—	GK	SRB	Igor Dmitrievic
—	MF	AZE	Ramil Sayadov (to (Azerbaijan) Simurq)
—	MF	AZE	Elnur Mammadov (to (Azerbaijan) Simurq)
—	MF	AZE	Orkhan Rajabov (to (Azerbaijan) Simurq)
—	MF	BLR	Mihail Makowski (to (Belarus) Darida Minsk Raion)
—	MF	MNE	Aleksandar Nedović
—	FW	BLR	Uladzimir Makowski (to (Belarus) Darida Minsk Raion)
—	FW	NGR	Lucky Idahor (to (Ukraine) Karpaty Lviv)

=== Winter ===
In: Note: Flags indicate national team as defined under FIFA eligibility rules; some limited exceptions apply. Players may hold more than one non-FIFA nationality.

No.	Pos.	Nation	Player
—	DF	AZE	Khayal Mustafayev (from (Azerbaijan) Olimpik Baku)
—	DF	SRB	Nikola Jolović (from (Russia) Saturn Ramenskoye)
—	MF	LTU	Andrius Gedgaudas (from (Lithuania) FK Atlantas)
—	FW	LTU	Valdas Trakys (from (Lithuania) FK Atlantas)
—	FW	BIH	Tomislav Stanić (from (Hungary) Diósgyőri)

Out: Note: Flags indicate national team as defined under FIFA eligibility rules; some limited exceptions apply. Players may hold more than one non-FIFA nationality.

No.	Pos.	Nation	Player
—	MF	ROU	Marius Suleap (to (Romania) Unirea Urziceni)
—	MF	AZE	Elvin Nuriyev (to (Azerbaijan) FK Baku)
—	MF	AZE	Yuri Muzika (to (Azerbaijan) FK Karvan)

== Competitions ==
=== Azerbaijan Premier League ===
==== Results ====
4 August 2006 1	Gabala	0 – 0	Inter Baku	Qabala
		[ Summary]		Stadium: Gabala City Stadium

20 August 2006 2	Neftchi Baku	0 – 1	Inter Baku	Baku
		[ Summary]	Shukurov 52' (o.g.)	Stadium: Tofik Bakhramov Stadium

25 August 2006 3	Inter Baku	2 – 0	Simurq	Baku
	Trakys; Levin	[ Summary]		Stadium: Shafa Stadium

17 September 2006 4	Baku	2 – 0	Inter Baku	Baku
	Gomes 62'; Amirbekov 76'	[ Summary]		Stadium: Tofig Bakhramov Stadium; Attendance: 200

23 September 2006 5	Inter Baku	0 – 0	Olimpik Baku	Baku
		[ Summary]		Stadium: Shafa Stadium; Attendance: 500

29 September 2006 6	Turan Tovuz	1 – 7	Inter Baku	Tovuz
	Igbekoi 48'	[ Summary]	Zagorac 19', 31'; S.Chernyak 47'; Trakys 69'; Aliyev 82', 90'; Imamaliev 86'	Stadium: Tovuz City Stadium

22 October 2006 7	Inter Baku	4 – 1	Gänclärbirliyi Sumqayit	Sumgayit
	Aliyev 17', 42', 64'; I.Mammadov 31'	[ Summary]	Nikiema 79'	Stadium: Mehdi Huseynzade Stadium; Attendance: 200

28 October 2006 8	Khazar Lankaran	0 – 0	Inter Baku	Lankaran
		[ Summary]		Stadium: Lankaran City Stadium; Attendance: 6,720

3 November 2006 9	Karvan	1 – 1	Inter Baku	Yevlakh
	Mirzaev 45'	[ Summary]	Aliyev 22'	Stadium: Yevlakh City Stadium

9 November 2006 10	Inter Baku	0 – 1	MKT-Araz	Baku
		[ Summary]	Aghakishiyev 75'	Stadium: Shafa Stadium

26 November 2006 11	Qarabağ	0 – 1	Inter Baku	Baku
		[ Summary]	Alegbe 19'	Stadium: Tofik Bakhramov Stadium^{2} Attendance: 400

9 December 2006 12	Inter Baku	2 – 0	Shahdag	Baku
	Levin 7'; Hashimov 48'	[ Summary]		Stadium: Shafa Stadium

12 February 2007 13	Inter Baku	2 – 0	Gabala	Baku
	Axtyamov 48', 55'	[ Summary]		Stadium: Shafa Stadium

22 February 2007 14	Inter Baku	0 – 1	Neftchi Baku	Baku
		[ Summary]	Adamia 73'	Stadium: Shafa Stadium; Attendance: 2,000

18 March 2007 15	Simurq	1 – 2	Inter Baku	Zaqatala
	S.Seleznev 55' (pen.)	[ Summary]	Bakhshiev 21'; Ražanauskas 33'	Stadium: Zaqatala City Stadium; Attendance: 300

3 April 2007 16	Inter Baku	1 – 0	Turan Tovuz	Baku
	Imamaliev 21'	[ Summary]		Stadium: Shafa Stadium; Attendance: 300

8 April 2007 17	Gänclärbirliyi Sumqayit	0 – 4	Inter Baku	Sumgayit
		[ Summary]	Imamaliev 19'; E.Mammadov 54' (pen.); R.Tanrıverdiyev 64' (o.g.); I.Mammadov 74'	Stadium: Mehdi Huseynzade Stadium; Attendance: 200

18 April 2007 18	Inter Baku	0 – 0	Khazar Lankaran	Baku
		[ Summary]		Stadium: Shafa Stadium; Attendance: 4,500

28 April 2007 19	Inter Baku	0 – 1	Baku	Baku
		[ Summary]	Pérez 70'	Stadium: Shafa Stadium; Attendance: 1,200

2 May 2007 20	Inter Baku	1 – 1	Karvan	Baku
	Intskirveli 39' (o.g.)	[ Summary]	S.Abdullayev 48'	Stadium: Shafa Stadium; Attendance: 400

7 May 2007 21	MKT-Araz	0 – 0	Inter Baku	Imishli
		[ Summary]	Akhtyamov 20'; E.Mammadov	Stadium: Heydar Aliyev Stadium

12 May 2007 22	Olimpik Baku	1 – 0	Inter Baku	Baku
	Fábio 55'	[ Summary]		Stadium: Shafa Stadium; Attendance: 200

18 May 2007 23	Inter Baku	1 – 0	Qarabağ	Baku
	Ražanauskas	[ Summary]		Stadium: Shafa Stadium

26 May 2007 24	Şahdağ	1 – 5	Inter Baku	Qusar
	S.Sadiqov 85'	[ Summary]	Alegbe 2'; Mammadov 48', 53'; Ismailov 59'; Muzika 71'	Stadium: Şövkət Orduxanov Stadium; Attendance: 200

==== Table ====
Pos	Team	Pld	W	D	L	GF	GA	GD	Pts	Qualification or relegation
2	Neftçi Baku	24	17	3	4	47	15	+32	54	Qualification for UEFA Cup first qualifying round (Note: MKT-Araz qualified for the first qualifying round of the 2005–06 UEFA Cup as winner of the 2004–05 Azerbaijan Cup.)
3	Baku	24	14	6	4	25	10	+15	48	Qualification for Intertoto Cup first round
4	Inter Baku	24	13	6	5	36	12	+24	45	
5	FK MKT-Araz	24	12	5	7	23	18	+5	41	Qualification for UEFA Cup first qualifying round
6	Olimpik Baku	24	11	8	5	28	17	+11	41	

Source: Azerbaijan Professional Football league

=== Azerbaijan Cup ===
20 November 2006 First Round 1st Leg	Neftchi Baku-2	1 – 4	Inter Baku	Baku
AZT (UTC+4)	F.Äzimov 77'	[ Summary]	Hashimov 7'; E.Mammadov 45+1'; Aliyev 52', 56'

16 October 2006 First Round 2nd Leg	Inter Baku	5 – 0 (9 – 1 agg.)	Neftchi Baku-2	Baku
AZT (UTC+4)		[ Summary]		Stadium: Shafa Stadium

20 November 2006 Last 16 1st Leg	Shahdag	1 – 2	Inter Baku	Qusar
AZT (UTC+4)	I.İsrafilov 34'	[ Summary]	Hashimov 38'; Ismailov 71'	Stadium: Shovkat Ordukhanov Stadium; Attendance: 200

2 December 2006 Last 16 2nd Leg	Inter Baku	4 – 0 (6 – 1 agg.)	Shahdag	Baku
AZT (UTC+4)	Akhtyamov 5'; Poladov 35'; S.Chernyak 48'; Levin 77'	[ Summary]		Stadium: Shafa Stadium; Attendance: 200

26 February 2007 Quarterfinals 1st Leg	Gänclärbirliyi Sumqayit	0 – 2	Inter Baku	Sumgayit
AZT (UTC+4)		[ Summary]	E.Mammadov 8'; Trakys 49'	Stadium: Mehdi Huseynzade Stadium; Attendance: 300

22 April 2007 Quarterfinals 2nd Leg	Inter Baku	3 – 2 (5 – 2 agg.)	Gänclärbirliyi Sumqayit	Baku
AZST (UTC+5)	Imamaliev 18'; Hashimov 60'; Gedgaudas 74'	[ Summary]	O.Agayarzada 8'; N.Tagıyev 83'	Stadium: Shafa Stadium; Attendance: 500

13 April 2007 Semifinals 1st Leg	Inter Baku	0 – 1	Khazar Lankaran	Baku
AZST (UTC+5)		[ Summary]	Abdullayev 51'	Stadium: Shafa Stadium; Attendance: 3,500

22 April 2007 Semifinals 2nd Leg	Khazar Lankaran	1 – 0 (2 – 0 agg.)	Inter Baku	Lankaran
AZST (UTC+5)	Quliyev 18' (pen.)	[ Summary]		Stadium: Lankaran City Stadium; Attendance: 11,000

== Squad statistics ==
=== Appearances and goals ===
No.	Pos	Nat	Player	Total		Premier League		Azerbaijan Cup	
No.	Pos	Nat	Player	Apps	Goals	Apps	Goals	Apps	Goals
	GK	(Azerbaijan) AZE	Elshan Poladov	2	0	2	0	0	0
	GK	(Azerbaijan) AZE	Farhad Veliyev	22	0	22	0	0	0
	DF	(Azerbaijan) AZE	Aykhan Abbasov	15	0	15	0	0	0
	DF	(Nigeria) NGR	Tony Alegbe	18	2	18	2	0	0
	DF	(Azerbaijan) AZE	Zaur Hashimov	20	1	20	1	0	0
	DF	(Serbia) SRB	Nikola Jolović	10	0	10	0	0	0
	DF	(Azerbaijan) AZE	Volodimir Levin	22	2	22	2	0	0
	DF	(Azerbaijan) AZE	Khayal Mustafayev	12	0	12	0	0	0
	DF	(Azerbaijan) AZE	Mikayil Namazov	5	0	5	0	0	0
	DF	(Azerbaijan) AZE	Ruslan Poladov	21	0	21	0	0	0
	DF	(Serbia) SRB	Milan Zagorac	5	2	5	2	0	0
	MF	(Azerbaijan) AZE	Elmar Bakhshiev	22	1	22	1	0	0
	MF	(Ukraine) UKR	Sergey Chernyak	11	1	11	1	0	0
	MF	(Lithuania) LTU	Andrius Gedgaudas	9	0	9	0	0	0
	MF	(Azerbaijan) AZE	Emin Imamaliev	20	3	20	3	0	0
	MF	(Azerbaijan) AZE	Aliyar Ismailov	15	1	15	1	0	0
	MF	(Azerbaijan) AZE	Vyacheslav Lychkin	3	0	3	0	0	0
	MF	(Azerbaijan) AZE	Ismayil Mammadov	21	4	21	4	0	0
	MF	(Azerbaijan) AZE	Yuri Muzika	3	1	3	1	0	0
	MF	(Lithuania) LTU	Tomas Ražanauskas	6	2	6	2	0	0
	FW	(Azerbaijan) AZE	Daniel Akhtyamov	18	1	18	1	0	0
	FW	(Azerbaijan) AZE	Samir Aliyev	9	6	9	6	0	0
	FW	(Azerbaijan) AZE	Elshan Mammadov	21	2	21	2	0	0
	FW	(Bosnia and Herzegovina) BIH	Tomislav Stanić	4	0	4	0	0	0
	FW	(Lithuania) LTU	Valdas Trakys	12	3	12	3	0	0
Players who appeared for Inter Baku and left during the season:
	MF	(Azerbaijan) AZE	Elvin Nuriyev	1	0	1	0	0	0
	FW	(Romania) ROU	Marius Suleap	1	0	1	0	0	0

=== Goal scorers ===
Place	Position	Nation	Number	Name	Premier League	Azerbaijan Cup	Total
1	FW	(Azerbaijan)		Samir Aliyev	6	2	8
2	MF	(Azerbaijan)		Ismayil Mammadov	4	0	4
2	MF	(Azerbaijan)		Emin Imamaliev	3	1	4
2	FW	(Lithuania)		Valdas Trakys	3	1	4
2	FW	(Azerbaijan)		Elshan Mammadov	2	2	4
2	DF	(Azerbaijan)		Zaur Hashimov	1	3	1
7	DF	(Azerbaijan)		Volodimir Levin	2	1	3
7	FW	(Azerbaijan)		Daniel Akhtyamov	2	1	3
7				Own goal	3	0	3
10	DF	(Nigeria)		Tony Alegbe	2	0	2
10	MF	(Lithuania)		Tomas Ražanauskas	2	0	2
10	DF	(Serbia)		Milan Zagorac	2	0	2
10	DF	(Azerbaijan)		Aliyar Ismailov	1	1	2
10	MF	(Ukraine)		Sergey Chernyak	1	1	2
15	MF	(Azerbaijan)		Elmar Bakhshiev	1	0	1
15	MF	(Azerbaijan)		Yuri Muzika	1	0	1
15	MF	(Azerbaijan)		Ruslan Poladov	0	1	1
15	MF	(Lithuania)		Andrius Gedgaudas	0	1	1
				Unknown	0	5	5
				TOTALS	36	19	55

== Notes ==
- Qarabağ have played their home games at the Tofiq Bahramov Stadium since 1993 due to the ongoing situation in Quzanlı.
