= List of Azerbaijani footballers =

This is a complete list of football (soccer) players from Azerbaijan.

The comprehensive listing of the players is according to citizenship and registration in the database of the Association of Football Federations of Azerbaijan.

== A ==
- Aykhan Abbasov
- Ramazan Abbasov
- Samir Abbasov
- Urfan Abbasov
- Araz Abdullayev
- Asgar Abdullayev
- Rashad Abdullayev
- Ilgar Abdurakhmanov
- Rasim Abishov
- Ruslan Abishov
- Emin Agaev
- Kamran Agayev
- Murad Aghakishiyev
- Salahat Aghayev
- Haji Ahmadov
- Tarlan Ahmadov
- Samir Alakbarov
- Ahmad Alaskarov
- Elvin Aliyev
- Nazim Aliyev
- Pasha Aliyev
- Rauf Aliyev
- Samir Aliyev
- Elnur Allahverdiyev
- Rafael Amirbekov
- Rahid Amirguliyev
- Ruslan Amirjanov
- Arif Asadov

== B ==
- Tofiq Bahramov
- Elmar Bakhshiev
- Ufuk Budak

== D ==
- Arif Dashdemirov
- Shahin Diniyev

== G ==
- Deni Gaisumov
- Elshan Gambarov
- Gara Garayev
- Ibragim Gasanbekov
- Zaur Gashimov
- Vali Gasimov
- Igor Getman
- Ali Gökdemir
- Rufat Guliev
- Eshgin Guliyev
- Farid Guliyev
- Ramin Guliyev
- Amit Guluzade
- Gurban Gurbanov
- Ilgar Gurbanov
- Badavi Guseynov

== H ==
- Aftandil Hajiyev
- Boyukagha Hajiyev
- Nizami Hajiyev
- Rahman Hajiyev
- Namiq Həsənov
- Jahangir Hasanzade
- Zaur Hashimov
- Javid Huseynov
- Murad Hüseynov
- Ramal Huseynov
- Vurğun Hüseynov
- Yunis Huseynov

== I ==
- Ruslan İdiqov
- Emin Imamaliev
- Javid Imamverdiyev
- Arif İsayev
- Afran Ismayilov
- Farrukh Ismayilov

== J ==
- Emin Jafarguliyev
- Sevinj Jafarzade
- Tural Jalilov
- Vagif Javadov

== K ==
- Rashad Karimov
- Aslan Kerimov
- Kenan Kerimov
- Kurban Kurbanov

== M ==
- Murad Megamadov
- Jamshid Maharramov
- Ruslan Majidov
- Rail Malikov
- Rail Melikov
- Alakbar Mammadov
- Aqil Mammadov
- Azer Mammadov
- Elvin Mammadov
- Elshan Mammadov
- Ismayil Mammadov
- Khagani Mammadov
- Nodar Mammadov
- Ramiz Mammadov
- Fizuli Mammedov
- Rauf Mehdiyev
- Hüseyn Məhəmmədov
- Agaselim Mirjavadov
- Bəxtiyar Musaev
- Ruslan Musayev
- Samir Musayev

== N ==
- Nadir Nabiev
- Agil Nabiyev
- Vüqar Nadirov
- Anar Nazirov
- Aqil Nəbiyev
- Adehim Niftaiyev
- Nurlan Novruzov

== Ö ==
- Cihan Özkara

== Q ==
- Ilkin Qirtimov
- Kazemır Qudiyev
- Emin Quliyev
- Kamal Quliyev
- Alim Qurbanov
- Mahmud Qurbanov

== R ==
- Shahriyar Rahimov
- Rasim Ramaldanov
- Zaur Ramazanov
- Elhan Rasulov
- Vidadi Rzayev

== S ==
- Rashad Sadiqov
- Rashad Sadygov
- Vagif Sadygov
- Ramil Sheydayev
- Samadagha Shikhlarov
- Mahir Shukurov
- Nadir Shukurov
- Narvik Sirkhayev
- Nazim Suleymanov
- Jeyhun Sultanov
- Elman Sultanov

== T ==
- Zaur Tagizade
- Kazbek Tuaev

== U ==
- Rizvan Umarov
- Nduka Usim

== V ==
- Farhad Veliyev

== Y ==
- Ilham Yadullayev
- Saşa Yunisoğlu
- Elvin Yunuszade
- Mikayil Yusifov
- Namiq Yusifov
- Ruhid Yusubov

== Z ==
- Zeynal Zeynalov
- Vahid Zeynalov

== See also ==
- Football in Azerbaijan
- Association of Football Federations of Azerbaijan
- Azerbaijan national football team
- Azerbaijan Premier League
- List of Azerbaijani wrestlers
