= 2008–09 FK Qarabağ season =

Qarabağ
2008–09 season
- Chairman: Tahir Gözal
- Manager: Gurban Gurbanov
- Stadium: Guzanli Olympic Complex Stadium
- Premier League: 5th
- Azerbaijan Cup: Winners
- Top goalscorer: League: Nidal Ferhatovic; Artim Šakiri (7); All: Vagif Javadov (9)
Home colours	Away colours

The Qarabağ 2008–09 season was Qarabağ's 16th Azerbaijan Premier League season, and their first season under Gurban Gurbanov. They finished the season in 5th place, and won the Azerbaijan Cup defeating Inter Baku in the final.

== Squad ==
Note: Flags indicate national team as defined under FIFA eligibility rules; some limited exceptions apply. Players may hold more than one non-FIFA nationality.

No.	Pos.	Nation	Player
1	GK	AZE	Farhad Veliyev
2	DF	AZE	Huseyn Isgandarov
3	DF	AZE	Aftandil Hajiyev
4	DF	AZE	Azer Mammadov
5	DF	AZE	Maksim Medvedev
6	MF	AZE	Rashad Sadiqov
7	DF	ALB	Admir Teli
8	MF	AZE	Aslan Karimov
9	FW	BIH	Nidal Ferhatovic
10	MF	MKD	Artim Šakiri
11	FW	AZE	Rauf Aliyev
12	GK	AZE	Sahil Karimov
13	DF	MKD	Zekirija Ramadani
14	MF	AZE	Namiq Yusifov

No.	Pos.	Nation	Player
15	MF	AZE	Aykhan Abbasov
16	DF	AZE	Elnur Allahverdiyev
17	MF	BIH	Sedat Şahin
18	FW	AZE	Zaur Ramazanov
19	MF	AZE	Emin Imamaliyev
20	FW	AZE	Vagif Javadov
23	MF	AZE	Afran Ismayilov
26	DF	AZE	Zaur Hashimov
99	GK	AZE	Osman Umarov
—	GK	AZE	Vadim Naumov
--	DF	AZE	Bayram Kerimov
--	MF	AZE	Shahriyar Khalilov
--	MF	AZE	Timur Israfilov
--	FW	AZE	Agshin Mehtiyev

== Transfers ==
=== Summer ===
In: Note: Flags indicate national team as defined under FIFA eligibility rules; some limited exceptions apply. Players may hold more than one non-FIFA nationality.

No.	Pos.	Nation	Player
7	MF	GEO	Aleksandr Gogoberishvili (from (Azerbaijan) Baku)
9	FW	BIH	Nidal Ferhatovic (from (Sweden) Vasalund)
10	MF	MKD	Artim Šakiri (from (Albania) Besa Kavajë)
12	GK	AZE	Sahil Kerimov (from (Azerbaijan) Karvan)
13	DF	MKD	Zekirija Ramadan (from (Albania) Besa Kavajë)
17	MF	BIH	Sedat Şahin (from (Slovakia) LAFC Lučenec)
18	FW	AZE	Zaur Ramazanov (from (Azerbaijan) Khazar Lankaran)
19	MF	AZE	Emin Imamaliev (from (Azerbaijan) Inter Baku)

Out: Note: Flags indicate national team as defined under FIFA eligibility rules; some limited exceptions apply. Players may hold more than one non-FIFA nationality.

No.	Pos.	Nation	Player
13	DF	AZE	Nodar Mammadov (loan to (Azerbaijan) MOIK Baku)
16	MF	AZE	Tagim Novruzov (loan to (Azerbaijan) MOIK Baku)
25	MF	LBR	Isaac Pupo (to (Azerbaijan) Mughan)
—	DF	AZE	Sergei Sokolov (to (Azerbaijan) Simurq)
—	MF	GEO	Goga Beraia (from (Azerbaijan) Gabala)
—	FW	AZE	Kenan Kerimov (to (Azerbaijan) Gabala)

=== Winter ===
In: Note: Flags indicate national team as defined under FIFA eligibility rules; some limited exceptions apply. Players may hold more than one non-FIFA nationality.

No.	Pos.	Nation	Player
6	DF	AZE	Rashad Sadiqov (from (Azerbaijan) Neftchi Baku)
7	DF	ALB	Admir Teli (from (Turkey) Hacettepe)
16	DF	AZE	Elnur Allahverdiyev (from (Azerbaijan) Neftchi Baku)

Out: Note: Flags indicate national team as defined under FIFA eligibility rules; some limited exceptions apply. Players may hold more than one non-FIFA nationality.

No.	Pos.	Nation	Player
6	DF	GUI	Mamaduba Soumah
7	MF	GEO	Aleksandr Gogoberishvili (to (Azerbaijan) Olimpik Baku)
14	FW	NGR	Victor Igbekoyi (to (Azerbaijan) Turan Tovuz)

== Competitions ==
=== Azerbaijan Premier League ===
==== Results summary ====
Overall								Home						Away					
Pld	W	D	L	GF	GA	GD	Pts	W	D	L	GF	GA	GD	W	D	L	GF	GA	GD
26	14	7	5	35	22	+13	49	6	4	3	20	13	+7	8	3	2	15	9	+6

Last updated: 8 May 2013.
Source: Soccerway

==== Results ====
9 August 2008 1	Bakili Baku	1 – 2	Qarabağ	Baku
18:00 AZST (UTC+5)	Kokaşvili 63' (pen.)	Summary	Šakiri 24'; Igbekoyi 81'	Stadium: Shafa Stadium

16 August 2008 2	Qarabağ	1 – 1	Olimpik Baku	Baku
18:00 AZST (UTC+5)	Ferhatovic 90'	Summary	Junivan 22'	Stadium: Tofiq Bahramov Stadium^{2}

23 August 2008 3	Standard Baku	2 – 1	Qarabağ	Baku
21:00 AZST (UTC+5)	E.Lukoshevichius 21'; Məmmədov 76'	Summary	Ferhatovic 87'	Stadium: Shafa Stadium

30 August 2008 4	Qarabağ	0 – 2	Baku	Baku
18:00 AZST (UTC+5)		Summary	Hristov 5'; Fabio 78'	Stadium: Tofiq Bahramov Stadium^{2}

20 September 2008 5	Gabala	1 – 2	Qarabağ	Qabala
17:00 AZST (UTC+5)	Kerimov 85'	Summary	Imamaliev 35'; Javadov 90'	Stadium: Gabala City Stadium

27 September 2008 6	Qarabağ	0 – 2	Simurq	Baku
16:30 AZST (UTC+5)		Summary	Artiukh 21'; Medvedyev 51' (o.g.)	Stadium: Tofiq Bahramov Stadium^{2}

4 October 2008 7	Turan Tovuz	0 – 1	Qarabağ	Tovuz
16:00 AZST (UTC+5)		Summary	Šakiri 54'	Stadium: Tovuz City Stadium

18 October 2008 8	Qarabağ	3 – 1	NBC Salyan^{1}	Baku
16:00 AZST (UTC+5)	Ferhatovic 18', 73'; Šakiri 89'	Summary	Khalilov 64'	Stadium: Tofiq Bahramov Stadium^{2}

26 October 2008 9	MOIK Baku	0 – 1	Qarabağ	Baku
15:00 AZT (UTC+4)		Summary	Ferhatovic 76'	Stadium: Shafa Stadium

8 November 2008 10	Qarabağ	1 – 1	Neftchi Baku	Baku
14:15 AZT (UTC+4)	Imamaliev 90'	Summary	Bakhshiev 23'	Stadium: Tofiq Bahramov Stadium^{2}

15 November 2008 11	Inter Baku	1 – 1	Qarabağ	Baku
16:00 AZT (UTC+4)	Andaveris 14'	Summary	Javadov 24'	Stadium: Shafa Stadium

23 November 2008 12	Khazar Lankaran	1 – 3	Qarabağ	Lankaran
18:00 AZT (UTC+4)	Mario Sergio 90'	Summary	Javadov 54'; Ramazanov 69'; Şahin 83'	Stadium: Lankaran City Stadium

29 November 2008 13	Qarabağ	3 – 2	Karvan	Baku
14:15 AZT (UTC+4)	Javadov 31', 45'; Ramazanov 86'	Summary	Nadirov 60'; Meskhi 75'	Stadium: Tofiq Bahramov Stadium^{2}

14 February 2009 14	Qarabağ	3 – 0	Bakili Baku	Baku
14:00 AZT (UTC+4)	Imamaliyev 7', 53'; Teli 70'	Summary		Stadium: Tofiq Bahramov Stadium^{2}

21 February 2009 15	Olimpik Baku	0 – 1	Qarabağ	Baku
14:00 AZT (UTC+4)		Summary	Ramazanov 24'	Stadium: Shafa Stadion

28 February 2009 16	Qarabağ	0 – 1	Standard Baku	Baku
14:00 AZT (UTC+4)		Summary	Guliyev 90'	Stadium: Tofiq Bahramov Stadium^{2}

7 March 2009 17	Baku	2 – 0	Qarabağ	Baku
17:00 AZT (UTC+4)	Mujiri 66'; Batista 85'	Summary		Stadium: Tofig Bakhramov Stadium

15 March 2009 18	Qarabağ	0 – 0	Gabala	Baku
14:30 AZT (UTC+4)		Summary		Stadium: Tofiq Bahramov Stadium^{2}

22 March 2009 19	Simurq	0 – 0	Qarabağ	Zaqatala
18:00 AZT (UTC+4)		Summary		Stadium: Zaqatala City Stadium

5 April 2009 20	Qarabağ	4 – 2	Turan Tovuz	Baku
AZST (UTC+5)	Šakiri 53', 58'; Javadov 65'; Ferhatovic 67'	Summary	Erdoğdu 71'; Nabiyev 83'	Stadium: Tofiq Bahramov Stadium^{2}

11 April 2009 21	FK Mughan	1 – 2	Qarabağ	Salyan
16:00 AZST (UTC+5)	S.Qurbanov 49'	Summary	Aliyev 76'; Šakiri 87'	Stadium: Salyan Olympic Sport Complex Stadium

18 April 2009 22	Qarabağ	3 – 0	MOIK Baku	Baku
16:00 AZST (UTC+5)	Ferhatovic 53'; Kerimov 59'; Ramazanov 82'	Summary		Stadium: Tofiq Bahramov Stadium^{2}

26 April 2009 23	Neftchi Baku	0 – 1	Qarabağ	Baku
19:00 AZST (UTC+5)		Summary	Teli 70'	Stadium: Tofiq Bahramov Stadium

3 May 2009 24	Qarabağ	1 – 1	Inter Baku	Baku
16:00 AZST (UTC+5)	Şahin 35'	Summary	Rubins 59'	Stadium: Tofiq Bahramov Stadium^{2}

9 May 2009 25	Qarabağ	1 – 0	Khazar Lankaran	Baku
16:00 AZST (UTC+5)	Šakiri 86'	Summary		Stadium: Tofiq Bahramov Stadium^{2}

17 May 2009 26	Karvan	0 – 0	Qarabağ	Yevlakh
18:00 AZST (UTC+5)		Summary		Stadium: Yevlakh Stadium

==== Table ====
Pos	Team	Pld	W	D	L	GF	GA	GD	Pts	Qualification or relegation
3	Simurq	26	16	5	5	39	20	+19	53	Qualification for Europa League first qualifying round
4	Khazar Lankaran	26	15	5	6	49	21	+28	50	
5	Qarabağ	26	14	7	5	35	22	+13	49	Qualification for Europa League second qualifying round (Note: Karabakh won the 2008–09 Azerbaijan Cup and therefore qualified for the second qualifying round of the UEFA Europa League.)
6	Olimpik Baku	26	12	8	6	32	18	+14	44	
7	Standard Baku	26	12	3	11	30	31	−1	39	

Source: Soccerway.com
Rules for classification: 1) points; 2) goal difference; 3) number of goals scored.

=== Azerbaijan Cup ===
30 October 2008 Round of 16 1st Leg	Qarabağ	3 – 0	Bakili Baku	Baku
15:00 AZT (UTC+4)	Ramazanov 24', 88'; Ferhatovic 53'	Summary		Stadium: Tofiq Bahramov Stadium^{2}

5 November 2008 Round of 16 2nd Leg	Bakili Baku	0 – 0 (0 – 3 agg.)	Qarabağ	Baku
14:00 AZT (UTC+4)		Summary		Stadium: Tofig Bakhramov Stadium

25 February 2009 Quarterfinals 1st Leg	Qarabağ	1 – 0	Neftchi Baku	Baku
15:00 AZT (UTC+4)	Ramazanov 4'	Summary		Stadium: Tofiq Bahramov Stadium^{2}

12 March 2009 Quarterfinals 2nd Leg	Neftchi Baku	0 – 0 (0 – 1 agg.)	Qarabağ	Baku
19:00 AZT (UTC+4)		Summary		Stadium: Tofig Bakhramov Stadium

29 April 2009 Semifinals 1st leg	Baku	1 – 2	Qarabağ	Baku
18:00 AZST (UTC+5)	Fabio 90'	Summary	Allahverdiyev 57'; Javadov 67'	Stadium: Tofig Bakhramov Stadium

6 May 2009 Semifinals 2nd leg	Qarabağ	2 – 1 (4 – 2 agg.)	Baku	Baku
16:00 AZST (UTC+5)	Javadov 43'; Şahin 66'	Summary	Pérez 32'	Stadium: Tofiq Bahramov Stadium^{2}

23 May 2009 Final	Qarabağ	1 – 0	Inter Baku	Baku
19:00 AZST (UTC+5)	Javadov 57' (pen.)	Summary		Stadium: Tofik Bakhramov Stadium

== Squad statistics ==
=== Appearances and goals ===
No.	Pos	Nat	Player	Total		Premier League		Azerbaijan Cup	
No.	Pos	Nat	Player	Apps	Goals	Apps	Goals	Apps	Goals
1	GK	(Azerbaijan) AZE	Farhad Veliyev	23	0	23	0	0	0
3	DF	(Azerbaijan) AZE	Aftandil Hajiyev	13	0	13	0	0	0
4	DF	(Azerbaijan) AZE	Azer Mammadov	10	0	10	0	0	0
5	DF	(Azerbaijan) AZE	Maksim Medvedyev	20	0	20	0	0	0
6	MF	(Azerbaijan) AZE	Rashad Sadiqov	13	0	13	0	0	0
7	DF	(Albania) ALB	Admir Teli	13	2	13	2	0	0
8	MF	(Azerbaijan) AZE	Aslan Kerimov	22	1	22	1	0	0
9	FW	(Bosnia and Herzegovina) BIH	Nidal Ferhatovic	17	7	17	7	0	0
10	MF	(North Macedonia) MKD	Artim Šakiri	22	7	22	7	0	0
11	FW	(Azerbaijan) AZE	Rauf Aliyev	8	1	8	1	0	0
12	GK	(Azerbaijan) AZE	Sahil Kerimov	4	0	4	0	0	0
13	DF	(North Macedonia) MKD	Zekirija Ramadani	15	0	15	0	0	0
14	MF	(Azerbaijan) AZE	Namiq Yusifov	22	0	22	0	0	0
15	MF	(Azerbaijan) AZE	Aykhan Abbasov	16	0	16	0	0	0
16	DF	(Azerbaijan) AZE	Elnur Allahverdiyev	11	0	11	0	0	0
17	MF	(Bosnia and Herzegovina) BIH	Sedat Şahin	18	2	18	2	0	0
18	FW	(Azerbaijan) AZE	Zaur Ramazanov	24	4	24	4	0	0
19	MF	(Azerbaijan) AZE	Emin Imamaliyev	21	4	21	4	0	0
20	FW	(Azerbaijan) AZE	Vagif Javadov	25	6	25	6	0	0
26	DF	(Azerbaijan) AZE	Zaur Hashimov	19	0	19	0	0	0
	DF	(Azerbaijan) AZE	Murad Aghakishiyev	12	0	12	0	0	0
	DF	(Azerbaijan) AZE	Gara Garayev	1	0	1	0	0	0
Players who left Qarabağ on loan during the season:
16	MF	(Azerbaijan) AZE	Tagim Novruzov	1	0	1	0	0	0
23	MF	(Azerbaijan) AZE	Afran Ismayilov	1	0	1	0	0	0
Players who appeared for Qarabağ who left during the season:
6	DF	(Guinea) GUI	Mamaduba Soumah	3	0	3	0	0	0
7	MF	(Georgia (country)) GEO	Aleksandr Gogoberishvili	4	0	4	0	0	0
14	FW	(Nigeria) NGR	Victor Igbekoyi	3	1	3	1	0	0

=== Goal scorers ===
Place	Position	Nation	Number	Name	Premier League	Azerbaijan Cup	Total
1	FW	(Azerbaijan)	20	Vagif Javadov	6	3	9
2	FW	(Bosnia and Herzegovina)	9	Nidal Ferhatovic	7	1	8
3	MF	(North Macedonia)	10	Artim Šakiri	7	0	7
3	FW	(Azerbaijan)	18	Zaur Ramazanov	4	3	7
5	MF	(Azerbaijan)	19	Emin Imamaliyev	4	0	4
6	MF	(Bosnia and Herzegovina)	17	Sedat Şahin	2	1	3
7	DF	(Albania)	7	Admir Teli	2	0	2
8	FW	(Azerbaijan)	11	Rauf Aliyev	1	0	1
8	FW	(Nigeria)	14	Victor Igbekoyi	1	0	1
8	MF	(Azerbaijan)	8	Aslan Kerimov	1	0	1
8	DF	(Azerbaijan)	16	Elnur Allahverdiyev	0	1	1
				TOTALS	35	9	44

== Notes ==
- On 31 October 2008, FK NBC Salyan changed their name to FK Mughan.
- Qarabağ have played their home games at the Tofiq Bahramov Stadium since 1993 due to the ongoing situation in Quzanlı.
