= 2000–01 Azerbaijan Top League =

Azerbaijan Top League
- Season: 2000–01
- Champions: Shamkir
- Champions League: Shamkir
- UEFA Cup: Shafa Baku; Neftchi Baku
- Top goalscorer: Pasha Aliyev (13)

The 2000–01 Azerbaijan Top League was contested by 11 clubs and won by FK Shamkir.

== League table ==
Pos	Team	Pld	W	D	L	GF	GA	GD	Pts	Qualification or relegation
1	Shamkir (C)	20	16	3	1	60	14	+46	51	Qualification for Champions League first qualifying round (Note: Shamkir and Neftchi Baku finished equal on points, and a championship play-off to determine the winner was won by Shamkir.)
2	Neftchi Baku	20	16	3	1	57	11	+46	51	Qualification for UEFA Cup qualifying round
3	Vilash Masalli	20	11	5	4	24	11	+13	38	Qualification for Intertoto Cup first round
4	Shafa Baku	20	10	1	9	27	26	+1	31	Qualification for UEFA Cup qualifying round (Note: Shafa Baku qualified for the qualifying round of the 2001–02 UEFA Cup as winners of the 2000–01 Azerbaijan Cup.)
5	Turan Tovuz	20	9	3	8	42	28	+14	30	
6	Dinamo Bakili Baki	20	9	2	9	30	29	+1	29	
7	Hazar Universiteti Baki	20	9	2	9	26	38	−12	29	
8	FK Gäncä	20	8	1	11	34	29	+5	25	
9	Karabakh Agdam	20	5	4	11	19	34	−15	19	
10	Araz Nahchivan	20	3	3	14	14	55	−41	12	
11	Shahdagh Guba (R)	20	0	1	19	5	63	−58	1	Relegation to Azerbaijan First Division

Source: Azerbaijan Professional Football league
Rules for classification: 1) points; 2) goal difference; 3) number of goals scored.
(C) Champions; (R) Relegated

== Results ==
Home \ Away	ARA	DBB	KUB	GAN	NEF	QAR	SHB	ŞAH	SHA	TUR	MAS
Araz Naxçıvan		0–0	2–0	1–3	0–7	2–1	0–4	3–0 (Note: Match rated as walkover due to the withdrawal of Shahdagh Guba.)	1–5	1–1	1–2
Dinamo Bakili Baku	3–0 (Note: Walkover.)		1–2	0–2	0–2	2–4	0–1	2–1	1–4	4–1	2–1
Khazar University	3–1	1–2		3–0	1–4	0–0	1–0	3–0	2–2	1–0	2–0
Ganja	6–0	1–2	7–1		1–3	2–1	2–3	3–0	0–3	2–1	0–0
Neftçi Baku	6–0	1–1	7–2	1–0		3–0	3–1	3–0	1–1	5–1	1–0
Qarabağ	1–0	0–1	3–0	2–1	0–4		1–3	3–0	0–1	2–5	0–1
Shafa Baku	1–0	1–3	0–1	1–0	0–1	2–1		3–0	1–4	0–0	1–0
Shahdagh Guba	0–1	0–3	0–2	0–3	0–3	1–1	1–4		0–3	0–3	0–3
Şəmkir	8–0	3–1	5–0	2–1	2–0	5–1	2–1	10–1		1–0	0–1
Turan	7–2	2–1	3–1	3–0	1–2	3–0	5–0	4–1	1–2		0–0
Viləş FK	2–1	2–1	1–0	2–0	0–0	0–0	1–0	3–0	1–1	4–1	

Source: APL: Yüksək dəstə - 2000-01
Legend: Blue = home team win; Yellow = draw; Red = away team win.

== Championship play-off ==
15 May 2001

FK Shamkir	1–0	PFC Neftchi Baku
Asadov 21' (o.g.)

== Season statistics ==
=== Top scorers ===
Rank	Player	Club	Goals
1	(Azerbaijan) Pasha Aliyev	Dinamo Baku	13
2	(Azerbaijan) Khagani Mammadov	Shamkir	12
3	(Azerbaijan) Farrukh Ismayilov	Neftchi	11
4	(Azerbaijan) Viktor Kulikov	Shamkir	9
4	(Azerbaijan) Mushfig Huseynov	Neftchi	9
4	(Azerbaijan) Nadir Nabiyev	Turan Tovuz	9
7	(Georgia (country)) Giorgi Kilasonia	Turan Tovuz	8
8	(Georgia (country)) Badri Kvaratskhelia	Shamkir	7
8	(Azerbaijan) Kamal Guliyev	Neftchi	7
8	(Azerbaijan) İlham Allahyarov	Araz Nahchivan	6
