= List of FK Genclerbirliyi Sumqayit records and statistics =

Genclerbirliyi Sumqayit was an Azerbaijani professional football club based in Sumqayit from 2003 to 2008.

This list encompasses the major records set by the club and their players in the Azerbaijan Premier League. The player records section includes details of the club's goalscorers and those who have made more than 50 appearances in first-team competitions.

== Player ==
=== Most appearances ===
Players played over 50 competitive, professional matches only. Appearances as substitute (goals in parentheses) included in total.

	Name	Years	League	Azerbaijan Cup	Total
1	(Azerbaijan) Emil Paşayev	2004–2008	94 (1)	(-)	94 (7)
2	(Azerbaijan) Orxan Ağayarzadə	2004–2008	57 (1)	(3)	57 (4)
3	(Burkina Faso) Issa Nikiema	2004-2005, 2005–2007	54 (20)	(2)	54 (22)
4	(Guinea) Saliou Diallo	2004–2007	50 (0)	(-)	50 (0)

=== Overall scorers ===
Competitive, professional matches only, appearances including substitutes appear in brackets.

	Name	Years	League	Azerbaijan Cup	Total
1	(Burkina Faso) Issa Nikiema	2004–2005, 2005-2007	20 (54)	2 (-)	22 (56)
2	(Guinea) Pathé Bangoura	2005-2006	12 (23)	(-)	12 (23)
3	(Azerbaijan) Zahir Əsgərov	2004-2006	3 (26)	4 (-)	7 (26)
4	(Azerbaijan) Namiq Əliyev	2004-2006	5 (49)	(-)	5 (49)
5	(Azerbaijan) Emin Amiraslanov	2005-2006, 2007-2008	2 (21)	2 (-)	4 (21)
5	(Azerbaijan) Nicat Tağıyev	2004-2008	3 (35)	1 (-)	4 (35)
5	(Azerbaijan) Orxan Ağayarzadə	2004-2008	1 (57)	3 (-)	4 (57)
8	(Azerbaijan) Fəqan Şahbazov	2005-2008	3 (38)	(-)	3 (38)
8	(Azerbaijan) Elvin Nuriyev	2007-2008	3 (22)	(-)	3 (22)
8	(Azerbaijan) Səbuhi Sadiqov	2007-2008	3 (21)	(-)	3 (21)
8	(Bosnia and Herzegovina) Tomislav Stanić	2007-2008	3 (18)	(-)	3 (18)
8	(Azerbaijan) Ismayil Mammadov	2008	3 (9)	(-)	3 (9)
8	(Azerbaijan) Arif İsayev	2006-2007	2 (10)	1 (-)	3 (10)
8	(Egypt) Ahmed Ghanem	2006-2007	1 (8)	2 (-)	3 (8)
15	(Azerbaijan) Samir Abdulov	2004-2005	2 (24)	(-)	2 (24)
15	(Azerbaijan) Zaur Məmmədov	2004-2005, 2007-2008	2 (27)	(-)	2 (27)
15	(Turkey) Mehmet Ali Arslan	2004-2006	2 (40)	(-)	2 (40)
15	(Azerbaijan) Azər Mehdiyev	2005-2006, 2007-2008	2 (28)	(-)	2 (28)
15	(Azerbaijan) Zaur Əsədov	2006-2007	2 (32)	(-)	2 (32)
15	(Azerbaijan) Adil Şükürov	2006-2007	2 (19)	(-)	2 (19)
15	(Azerbaijan) Ruslan Musayev	2007-2008	2 (22)	(-)	2 (22)
15	(Azerbaijan) Elnur Rüstəmov	2005-2007	1 (42)	1 (-)	2 (42)
23	(Azerbaijan) Emil Paşayev	2004-2008	1 (94)	(-)	1 (94)
23	(Azerbaijan) Ruslan Poladov	2004-2005	1 (30)	(-)	1 (30)
23	(Azerbaijan) Rashad Karimov	2004-2005	1 (15)	(-)	1 (15)
23	(Azerbaijan) Firuz Əliyev	2004-2005	1 (14)	(-)	1 (14)
23	(Turkey) Mehmet Kahraman	2004-2005	1 (12)	(-)	1 (12)
23	(Cameroon) Kristian Makqoun	2004-2005	1 (11)	(-)	1 (11)
23	(Azerbaijan) Tarlan Khalilov	2005-2006	1 (23)	(-)	1 (23)
23	(Azerbaijan) Rəşad Muradov	2005-2008	1 (25)	(-)	1 (25)
23	(Azerbaijan) Əhməd Eminov	2005-2007	1 (12)	(-)	1 (12)
23	(Azerbaijan) Hikmət Bağırov	2005-2007	1 (6)	(-)	1 (6)
23	(Mali) Cheick Dao Tidiani	2006-2007	1 (14)	(-)	1 (14)
23	(Egypt) Mustafa Möhsil	2006-2007	1 (11)	(-)	1 (11)
23	(Azerbaijan) Elgun Mammadov	2004-2008	0 (18)	1 (-)	1 (18)
23	(Azerbaijan) Ramin Huseynov	2005-2008	0 (32)	1 (-)	1 (32)
23	(Azerbaijan) Samir Guliyev	2006-2007	0 (7)	1 (-)	1 (7)
23	Own goal	2007-2008	0 (0)	1 (1)	1 (1)

== Team ==
=== Goals ===
- Most Premier League goals scored in a season: 32 – 2004–05
- Fewest League goals scored in a season: 16 – 2006-07
- Most League goals conceded in a season: 68 – 2007–08
- Fewest League goals conceded in a season: 28 – 2004-05

=== Points ===
- Most points in a season:

33 in 34 matches, Azerbaijan Premier League, 2004–05

- Fewest points in a season:

14 in 26 matches, Azerbaijan Premier League, 2007–08

== International representatives ==
Player	Nation	Caps	Goals	International years	Genclerbirliyi Sumqayit years
Abuzər İbrahimov	Azerbaijan	2	0	2000-2001	2006-2007
Arif İsayev	Azerbaijan	3	0	2011-2013	2006-2007
Tural Jalilov	Azerbaijan	4	0	2008-	2006-2007
Rashad Karimov	Azerbaijan	1	0	2007	2004-2005
Ruslan Majidov	Azerbaijan	1	0	2005	2007-2008
Ismayil Mammadov	Azerbaijan	7	0	2002-2005	2008
Ruslan Musayev	Azerbaijan	30	0	1997-2004	2007-2008
Adehim Niftaliyev	Azerbaijan	19	0	1999-2003	2007-2008
Elvin Nuriyev	Azerbaijan	3	0	2006	2005-2006, 2007-2008
Ruslan Poladov	Azerbaijan	1	0	2005	2004-2005
Farhad Veliyev	Azerbaijan	32	0	2006-	2004-2005
Issa Nikiema	Burkina Faso	1	0	1999	2004-2005, 2005-2007
Pathé Bangoura	Guinea	1	0	2004	2005-2006
Saliou Diallo	Guinea	16	0	1994-1998	2005-2007
