= 2001–02 Azerbaijan Cup =

2001-02 Azerbaijan Cup
Tournament details
- Country: Azerbaijan
- Teams: 16

Final positions
- Champions: Neftchi Baku
- Runners-up: Shamkir

Tournament statistics
- Matches played: 26
- Goals scored: 82 (3.15 per match)

The Azerbaijan Cup 2001–02 was the 11th season of the annual cup competition in Azerbaijan with the final taking place on 28 May 2002. Sixteen teams competed in this year's competition. Shafa Baku were the defending champions.

== First round ==
The first legs were played on October 18, 2001 and the second legs on November 1, 2001.

Team 1	Agg.	Team 2	1st leg	2nd leg
Adliyya Baku	2–5	Silavar Lankaran	1–1	1–4
Neftqaz Bakı	3–7	Khazar Lankaran	0–3	3–4
Khazar Sumgayit	0–1	Lokomotiv İmişli	0–1	0–0

== Round of 16 ==
The first legs were played on November 14, 2001 and the second legs on November 28, 2001.

Team 1	Agg.	Team 2	1st leg	2nd leg
Silavar Lankaran	2–6	Karabakh-Azersun	2–0	0–6
Shamkir	w/o	Dinamo Baku	w/o	w/o
Umid Baku	1–6	Xazar Universitesi Baku	1–3	w/o
Khazar Lankaran	2–12	Shafa Baku	0–0	2–12
Lokomotiv İmişli	2–5	Neftchi Baku	2–2	0–3
Sahdag Qusar	w/o	MOIK Baku	w/o	w/o
Araz Naxçivan	0–3	Kapaz	0–0	w/o
Bakili Baku	3–3 (a)	Turan Tovuz	3–2	0–1

== Quarterfinals ==
The first legs were played on April 9, 2002 and the second legs on May 11, 2002.

Team 1	Agg.	Team 2	1st leg	2nd leg
Kapaz	3–1	Turan Tovuz	2–0	1–1
Shamkir	3–1	Karabakh-Azersun	2–0	1–1
Neftchi Baku	4–1	Sahdag Qusar	3–1	1–0
Shafa Baku	w/o	Xazar Universitesi Baku	w/o	w/o

== Semifinals ==
The first legs were played on May 19, 2002 and the second legs on May 22, 2002.

Team 1	Agg.	Team 2	1st leg	2nd leg
Neftchi Baku	3–1	Kapaz	1–0	2–1
Shamkir	3–2	Xazar Universitesi Baku	2–0	1–2

== Final ==
Shamkir walked off in the 84th minute following a penalty award against them. Neftci were declared winners.

28 May 2002
AZST (UTC+5)

Neftchi Baku	3–0	Shamkir

Tofiq Bahramov Stadium, Baku
Attendance: 19,000
