= Román Cuello =

Uruguayan footballer and coach (born 1977)

Personal information
- Full name: Román Marcelo Cuello Arizmendi
- Date of birth: 4 April 1977 (age 49)
- Place of birth: Santa Lucía, Uruguay
- Height: 1.88 m (6 ft 2 in)
- Position: Forward

Senior career*
Years	Team	Apps	(Gls)
1997–1998	Montevideo Wanderers		
1999–2000	Frontera Rivera Chico		
2001	Cerro		
2002	Miramar Misiones		
2003	Manta		
2004	Rentistas		
2005	Nanjing Yoyo	13	(6)
2005	Alianza Lima		
2006	Defensor Sporting		
2006	Rangers de Talca		
2007	Deportes Melipilla		
2008	Inter Baku	9	(2)
2009	Palestino	9	(2)
2009–2010	Racing de Montevideo	6	(2)
2010	Cobresal	23	(5)
2011–2012	Fénix	32	(4)
2012–2013	Boston River		
2013	Rampla Juniors	5	(0)

Managerial career
- 2013–2014: Defensor Sporting (assistant)
- 2019: Montevideo Wanderers
- 2020: Liverpool Montevideo
- 2021–2022: Montevideo City Torque
- 2023–2024: Deportes Temuco
- 2024–2025: Talleres (assistant)
- 2026: Defensor Sporting
- * Club domestic league appearances and goals

Román Marcelo Cuello Arizmendi (born 4 April 1977 in Santa Lucía) is a Uruguayan football manager and former player who played as a forward.

== Coaching career ==
In December 2019, Cuello was appointed manager of Liverpool Montevideo.

In June 2023, he moved to Chile and signed with Deportes Temuco in the Primera B.

== Career statistics ==
=== In Azerbaijan ===
Club performance			League		Cup		Continental		Total	
Season	Club	League	Apps	Goals	Apps	Goals	Apps	Goals	Apps	Goals
Azerbaijan			League		Azerbaijan Cup		Europe		Total	
2007-08	Inter Baku	Azerbaijan Premier League	9	2			-		9	2
Total	Azerbaijan		9	2			0	0	9	2
Career total			9	2			0	0	9	2
