= Andrei Dragu =

Romanian footballer (born 1999)

Personal information
- Full name: Andrei Fernando Dragu
- Date of birth: 7 October 1999 (age 27)
- Place of birth: Târgu Jiu, Romania
- Height: 1.71 m (5 ft 7 in)
- Position: Left back

Team information
- Current team: Shafa Baku
- Number: 11

Youth career
- –2017: Pandurii Târgu Jiu

Senior career*
Years	Team	Apps	(Gls)
2017	Luceafărul Oradea	4	(0)
2018–2021	Viitorul Pandurii Târgu Jiu	80	(7)
2021–2024	Botoșani	63	(2)
2024–2025	FCU 1948 Craiova	20	(1)
2025–2026	Unirea Slobozia	28	(0)
2026–	Shafa Baku	6	(0)
- * Club domestic league appearances and goals as of 18 September 2026

Andrei Fernando Dragu (born 7 October 1999) is a Romanian professional footballer who plays as a left back for Azerbaijan Premier League club Shafa Baku.

== Career ==
Dragu transferred to Liga I side Botoşani in the summer of 2021. He made his league debut against FCSB on 15 July. He scored his first league goal against CFR Cluj on 11 December 2022. In June 2025, Dragu signed with top flight side Unirea Slobozia.

On 2 July 2026, Dragu signed with recently promoted Azerbaijan Premier League club Shafa Baku.

== Career statistics ==
As of match played 18 May 2026

Appearances and goals by club, season and competition
Club	Season	League			Cupa României		Europe		Other		Total	
Club	Season	Division	Apps	Goals	Apps	Goals	Apps	Goals	Apps	Goals	Apps	Goals
Luceafărul Oradea	2017–18	Liga II	4	0	0	0	—		—		4	0
Viitorul Pandurii Târgu Jiu	2018–19	Liga II	34	1	0	0	—		—		34	1
Viitorul Pandurii Târgu Jiu	2019–20	Liga II	21	3	0	0	—		—		21	3
Viitorul Pandurii Târgu Jiu	2020–21	Liga II	25	3	6	0	—		—		31	3
Viitorul Pandurii Târgu Jiu	Total		80	7	6	0	—		—		86	7
Botoșani	2021–22	Liga I	12	0	1	0	—		—		13	0
Botoșani	2022–23	Liga I	35	2	3	0	—		—		38	2
Botoșani	2023–24	Liga I	16	0	2	0	—		—		18	0
Botoșani	Total		63	2	6	0	0	0	0	0	69	2
FCU 1948 Craiova	2023–24	Liga I	7	1	1	0	—		—		8	1
FCU 1948 Craiova	2024–25	Liga II	13	0	1	0	—		—		14	0
FCU 1948 Craiova	Total		20	1	2	0	—		—		22	1
Unirea Slobozia	2025–26	Liga I	28	0	1	1	—		—		29	1
Shafa Baku	2026–27	Azerbaijan Premier League	6	0	0	0	—		—		6	0
Career total			201	10	15	1	0	0	0	0	216	11
