= 2000–01 Azerbaijan Cup =

2000-01 Azerbaijan Cup
Tournament details
- Country: Azerbaijan
- Teams: 24

Final positions
- Champions: Shafa
- Runners-up: Neftçi Baku

Tournament statistics
- Matches played: 40
- Goals scored: 129 (3.23 per match)

The Azerbaijan Cup 2000–01 was the 10th season of the annual cup competition in Azerbaijan with the final taking place on 25 May 2001. Twenty four teams competed in this year's competition. Kapaz were the defending champions.

== First round ==
Team 1	Agg.	Team 2	1st leg	2nd leg
Bakılı PFK	1–5	Neftçi Baku	1–1	0–4
Lokomotiv Baku	4–2	Magara	2–1	2–1
Narzan Gadabay	4–1	Shafa Baku II	2–1	2–0
Real Baku	6–6 (a)	Deniz Neftcileri	3–2	3–4
Umid Baku	2–0	Qarabağ FK	2–0	0–0
Sahdag Qusar	4–4 (a)	Viləş Masallı	1–0	3–4
Shilavar	3–8	Khazar Universiteti Baku	2–5	1–3
MOIK Baku	w/o	Shahdagh Guba	w/o	–

== Round of 16 ==
Team 1	Agg.	Team 2	1st leg	2nd leg
Neftchi Baku	2–1	Shamkir	2–0	0–1
Khazar Lankaran	1–11	Kapaz	0–2	1–9
Sahdag Qusar	2–1	Khazar Universiteti Baku	2–1	w/o
MOIK Baku	2–1	Karabakh	1–1	1–0
Narzan Gadabay	1–12	Dinamo Bakili Baki	0–3	1–9
Real Baku	w/o	Araz Naxçıvan	w/o	w/o
Umid Baku	0–2	Turan Tovuz	0–2	0–0
Lokomotiv Baku	0–10	Shafa Baku	0–5	0–5

== Quarterfinals ==
The first legs were played on December 16, 2000 and the second legs on December 23, 2000.

Team 1	Agg.	Team 2	1st leg	2nd leg
Neftchi Baku	4–1	Kapaz	1-0	3–1
Turan Tovuz	3–0	MOIK Baku	2–0	1–0
Dinamo Bakili Baki	7–0	Real Baku	4–0	3–0
Shafa Baku	5–1	Sahdag Qusar	3-0	2–1

== Semifinals ==
The first legs were played on May 18, 2001 and the second legs on May 22, 2001.

Team 1	Agg.	Team 2	1st leg	2nd leg
Turan Tovuz	1–3	Neftchi Baku	0–1	1–2
Shafa Baku	3–2	Dinamo Bakili Baki	0–0	3–2

== Final ==
25 May 2001
AZST (UTC+5)

Shafa Baku	2–1	Neftchi Baku
Mammadov 8'; Imamaliev 85'	Summary	Aliyev 23'

Mehdi Huseynzade Stadium, Sumqayit
Attendance: 1,500

The match was moved from Baku to Sumqayit 2 hours before kick off following a row between stadium officials and the FA concerning gate receipts.
