= Shafa Baku FK =

Azerbaijani football club

Shafa
- Full name: Shafa Football Club
- Founded: 1998
- Ground: Shafa Stadium
- Capacity: 8,300
- Owner: MyGroup Holding
- Manager: Zaur Hashimov
- League: Azerbaijan Premier League
- 2025–26: First League, 1st of 10 (promoted)
- Website: shafa-fc.com
Home colours	Away colours

Shafa Football Club (Azerbaijani: Şəfa Futbol Klubu) is an Azerbaijani professional football club based in Baku. Founded in 1998, the club won the Azerbaijan Cup in 2000–01 before withdrawing from senior football in the mid-2000s amid financial difficulties. It was later revived and, competing in the second-tier Azerbaijan First League, won the 2025–26 title to earn promotion to the Azerbaijan Premier League.

== History ==
=== Early years ===
Shafa was founded in 1998. The club won the 2000–01 Azerbaijan Cup, its first major honour. It later became inactive and spent a number of years out of competition.

=== Re-establishment and return to top flight ===
On 16 June 2023, by a decision of the AFFA Executive Committee, Shafa was admitted to the Azerbaijan Second League. The newly appointed head coach, Elshad Mammadov, rebuilt the team around young players. In the same year, the club was acquired by MyGroup Holding, which restructured its organisation.

In the 2024–25 season, Shafa finished second in the Second League and won promotion to the Azerbaijan First League. The following season, the club won the 2025–26 First League title under head coach Elgiz Karamli, sealing the championship with a home win over Jabrayil and earning promotion to the Azerbaijan Premier League for the first time in its history. After promotion, Karamli left the club, having declined an offer to remain on the coaching staff, and Zaur Hashimov—previously a coach at Gabala and Zira—was appointed head coach for the club's Premier League campaign, assisted by a staff including Haji Ahmadov and Rauf Aliyev.

=== National ===
- Azerbaijan Cup

Winners (1): 2000–2001

== Domestic league and cup history ==
Season	League									Azerbaijan Cup	Top League goalscorer	
Season	Div.	Pos.	Pl.	W	D	L	GS	GA	P	Azerbaijan Cup	Name	Total
1998–99	1st	12	26	3	5	18	24	54	14	Quarter-finals	(Azerbaijan) Səbuhi Sadiqov (Azerbaijan) Zaur Hashimov	6
1999–2000	1st	7	22	8	3	11	22	32	31	Quarter-finals	(Azerbaijan) Ramin Nasibov	4
2000–01	1st	4	20	10	1	9	27	26	31	Winners	(Azerbaijan) Elçin Rəhmanov	4
2001–02	1st	6	32	14	7	11	41	32	49	Quarter-finals	(Azerbaijan) Zaur Tagizade	12
2003–04	1st	6	26	12	3	11	40	23	39	Quarter-finals	(Azerbaijan) Sənan Qurbanov	12
2004–05	1st	18	34	2	1	31	16	95	7	1/16	(Nigeria) Amadi Luki	4

== European cup history ==
Season	Competition	Round	Country	Club	Home	Away	Aggregate
2001/02	UEFA Cup	1	(Slovenia)	Olimpija Ljubljana	0–3	0–4	0–7

== Squad ==
As of 8 November 2026

Note: Flags indicate national team as defined under FIFA eligibility rules; some limited exceptions apply. Players may hold more than one non-FIFA nationality.

No.	Pos.	Nation	Player
1	GK	AZE	Nicat Mehbalıyev
3	DF	AZE	Tarlan Guliyev
4	DF	GAM	Maudo Jarjue
5	DF	AZE	Arsen Agjabayov
6	MF	AZE	Farid Yusifli
7	FW	CAN	Tray Fuller
8	MF	ROU	Vlad Pop
9	FW	BRA	Luis Felipe
10	MF	NED	Dylan Mertens
11	DF	ROU	Andrei Dragu
12	GK	AZE	Alirza Müshtabazada
17	MF	CIV	Moussa Guel
18	FW	GUI	Bafodé Dansoko

No.	Pos.	Nation	Player
19	DF	AZE	Ramin Nasirli
20	MF	AZE	Elmir Tagiyev
21	DF	AZE	İsmayıl Zülfüqarlı
22	DF	FRA	Oumar Diaw
23	FW	AZE	Nahid Aliyev
28	DF	AZE	Murad Musayev (vice-captain)
34	DF	NED	Christopher Mamengi
39	MF	AZE	Eltun Babazada
42	FW	AZE	Elnur Jafarov (captain)
55	DF	AZE	Rauf Hüseynli
83	MF	AZE	Nihad Quliyev
96	GK	AZE	Aykhan Alizada
97	GK	POR	Tiago Silva
99	GK	AZE	Mammad Hüseynov

== League records ==
=== Appearances ===
Ran
1.	(Azerbaijan) Emin Imamaliev	91
2.	(Azerbaijan) Aftandil Hajiyev	86
2.	(Azerbaijan) Aykhan Abbasov	86
4.	(Azerbaijan) Ramin Nasibov	73
5.	(Azerbaijan) Namiq Əliyev	61
6.	(Azerbaijan) Mixail Kitelman	57
7.	(Azerbaijan) Ruslan Musayev	53
8.	(Azerbaijan) Səbuhi Sadiqov	45
9.	(Azerbaijan) Renat Abdaşov	44
10.	(Azerbaijan) Zaur Tagizade	42

=== Goals ===
Rank	Player	Goals
1.	(Azerbaijan) Zaur Tagizade	16
2.	(Azerbaijan) Emin Imamaliev	15
3.	(Azerbaijan) Ramin Nasibov	14
4.	(Azerbaijan) Sənan Qurbanov	12
4.	(Azerbaijan) Ruslan Musayev	12
6.	(Azerbaijan) Samir Musayev	11
7.	(Azerbaijan) Səbuhi Sadiqov	9
8.	(Azerbaijan) Aftandil Hajiyev	7
9.	(Azerbaijan) Elçin Rəhmanov	5
9.	(Azerbaijan) Namiq Əliyev	5
9.	(Azerbaijan) Fuad Əliyev	5

== Notable players ==
Had international caps for their respective countries. Players whose name is listed in bold represented their countries while playing for Shafa.

Azerbaijan

- (Azerbaijan) Murad Aghakishiyev
- (Azerbaijan) **Tarlan Ahmadov**
- (Azerbaijan) Elnur Allahverdiyev
- (Azerbaijan) Ramin Guliyev
- (Azerbaijan) **Aftandil Hajiyev**
- (Azerbaijan) Zaur Hashimov
- (Azerbaijan) **Ramal Huseynov**
- (Azerbaijan) **Emin Imamaliev**
- (Azerbaijan) **Fizuli Mammedov**
- (Azerbaijan) **Ruslan Musayev**
- (Azerbaijan) **Samir Musayev**
- (Azerbaijan) Rashad Sadiqov
- (Azerbaijan) Mahir Shukurov
- (Azerbaijan) **Zaur Tagizade**
- (Azerbaijan) **Muhammed Mammadli**
