= List of Azerbaijani wrestlers =

This is a complete list of Azerbaijani wrestlers.

== A ==
- Arif Abdullayev
- Namig Abdullayev
- Sona Ahmadli
- Emin Ahmadov
- Ashraf Aliyev
- Hasan Aliyev
- Azad Asgarov
- Toghrul Asgarov
- Emin Azizov

== B ==
- Patimat Bagomedova
- Rovshan Bayramov

== C ==
- Chamsulvara Chamsulvarayev

== D ==
- Islam Dugushiev

== G ==
- Khetag Gazyumov
- Zafar Guliyev

== H ==
- Jabrayil Hasanov
- Masoud Hashemzadeh
- Zelimkhan Huseynov

== I ==
- Mogamed Ibragimov
- Aydin Ibrahimov
- Ali Isayev
- Khazar Isayev

== M ==
- Rashid Mammadbeyov
- Farid Mansurov

== P ==
- Mehmet Akif Pirim

== R ==
- Vitaliy Rahimov
- Yuliya Ratkevich

== S ==
- Namig Sevdimov
- Sharif Sharifov
- Mariya Stadnik

== T ==
- Saman Tahmasebi
- Novruz Temrezov

== See also ==
•

- List of Azerbaijani footballers
