= Vlad Pop =

Romanian footballer (born 2000)

Personal information
- Full name: Vlad Marian Pop
- Date of birth: 31 August 2000 (age 26)
- Place of birth: Târgu Mureș, Romania
- Height: 1.80 m (5 ft 11 in)
- Position: Central midfielder

Team information
- Current team: Shafa Baku
- Number: 8

Youth career
- ACS Kinder Târgu Mureș
- –2017: Centrul de Excelență Târgu Mureș
- 2017–2019: Centrul de Excelență Timișoara

Senior career*
Years	Team	Apps	(Gls)
2019–2025	FC U Craiova	82	(2)
2022–2023	→ Mioveni (loan)	29	(0)
2025–2026	Unirea Slobozia	32	(1)
2026–	Shafa Baku	5	(0)

International career
2021–2023	Romania U21	7	(0)
- * Club domestic league appearances and goals as of 18 September 2026

Vlad Marian Pop (born 31 August 2000) is a Romanian professional footballer who plays as a central midfielder for Azerbaijan Premier League club Shafa Baku.

== Club career ==
Pop made his league debut on 16 July 2021 in Liga I match against CFR Cluj.

On 1 July 2026, Pop signed with Azerbaijan Premier League club Shafa Baku.

== Honours ==
FC U Craiova

- Liga II: 2020–21
- Liga III: 2019–20
