= Elmir Tağıyev =

Azerbaijani footballer (born 2000)

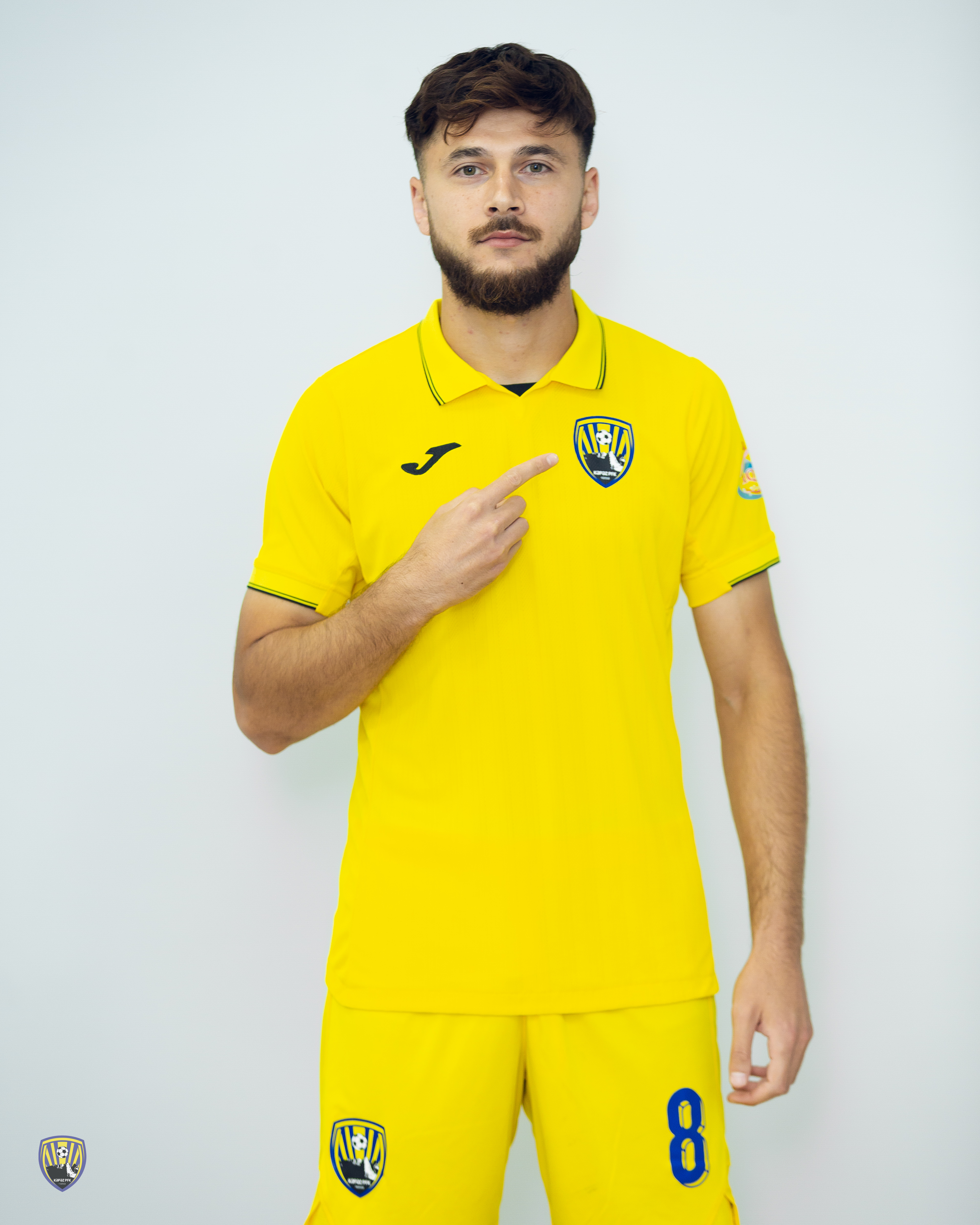

Personal information
- Full name: Elmir Fərrux oğlu Tağıyev
- Date of birth: 23 May 2000 (age 26)
- Place of birth: Mingachevir, Azerbaijan
- Height: 1.81 m (5 ft 11 in)
- Position: Midfielder

Team information
- Current team: Drenica

Senior career*
Years	Team	Apps	(Gls)
2020–2021	Turan Tovuz		
2021–2023	Sabail FK	43	(1)
2023–2024	→ Kapaz (loan)	26	(1)
2024–2025	Kapaz	16	(0)
2025–	Drenica	1	(0)
- * Club domestic league appearances and goals as of 21 October 2025

Elmir Fərrux oğlu Tağıyev (born 23 May 2000) is an Azerbaijani professional footballer who plays as a midfielder for Drenica in Kosovo.

== Career ==
Tağıyev was born on 23 May 2000 in Mingachevir, Azerbaijan.

He began his professional career with Turan Tovuz in 2020. In 2021, he joined Sabail, where he played until 2023.

In July 2023, Tağıyev joined Kapaz on loan from Sabail. He spent the 2023–24 season with Kapaz.

In July 2024, Tağıyev permanently joined Kapaz, signing a contract on 4 July 2024. The contract was valid until 30 June 2025.

During the 2024–25 season, Tağıyev suffered a muscle tear. He underwent surgery in Istanbul in November 2024.

On 27 August 2025, Tağıyev joined Drenica of Kosovo.
