= Elkhan Hasanov =

Azerbaijani footballer (born 1967)

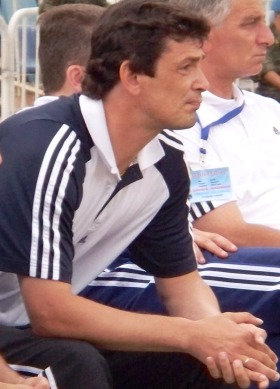

Personal information
- Full name: Elkhan Eldar oglu Hasanov
- Date of birth: 4 March 1967 (age 59)
- Place of birth: Baku, Soviet Union
- Position: Goalkeeper

Senior career*
Years	Team	Apps	(Gls)
1986–1991	Neftchi Baku		
1992	Khazar Sumgayit	24	(0)
1993–1997	Neftchi Baku	97	(0)
1997	Turun Palloseura	4	(0)
1998–2000	Kotkan TP	38	(0)
2000–2001	Neftchi Baku	2	(0)
2001–2003	Umid Baku	9	(0)
2003–2004	Neftchi Baku	5	(0)
2004–2007	Karvan	42	(0)
2007	Inter Baku	2	(0)

International career^{‡}
1992–2000	Azerbaijan	16	(0)

Managerial career
- 2009–: Qarabağ (goalkeeper coach)
- * Club domestic league appearances and goals ‡ National team caps and goals as of 7 March 2012

Elxan Həsənov (born 12 August 1967) is a retired Azerbaijani international footballer who played as a goalkeeper.

== International career ==
Həsənov represented Azerbaijan between 1992 and 2000, winning 16 caps.
