= Zabrat Stadium =

Stadium in Zabrat, Azerbaijan

Coordinates: 40.4920°N 49.9476°E

- Location: Zabrat, Azerbaijan
- Capacity: 3,000

Tenants
- Neftçi PFK

Zabrat Stadium is a multi-use stadium in Zabrat, Azerbaijan. It is currently used mostly for Association football matches and is the home stadium of Neftçi PFK. The stadium holds 3,000 people.
