= Azerbaijan Cup =

- Founded: 1992; 34 years ago
- Region: Azerbaijan
- Teams: 19
- Qualifier for: UEFA Europa Conference League
- Current champions: Sabah (2nd title)
- Most championships: Qarabağ (8 titles)
- Broadcaster: CBC Sport
- 2025–26 Azerbaijan Cup

The Azerbaijan Cup (Azerbaijani: Azərbaycan Milli Futbol Kuboku) is a major association football competition in Azerbaijan. In its original form, it started in 1936, when Azerbaijan was a republic of the Soviet Union and it was not contested by Azerbaijani teams in the Soviet league pyramid.

Compared to major football competitions in many other countries, the tournament in Azerbaijan attracts considerably less public interest and even the cup final is rarely sold out. Consequently, the Association of Football Federations of Azerbaijan has experimented with the format in order to raise the profile of the competition.

== Format ==
The clubs from the Azerbaijan First League (2nd tier) play in the First Round. The winners of that round advance to the Second Round, where the clubs from the Azerbaijan Premier League (1st tier) join. For the quarterfinals and the semifinals, the home and away system is used. For the finals, the format is restored to head-to-head.

== Participants ==
All clubs from the Azerbaijan Premier League and First Division.

== Soviet time cup winners ==
- 1936: Stroitel Yuga Baku
- 1937: Temp Baku
- 1938: Temp Baku
- 1939: Lokomotiv Baku
- 1940: Dinamo Baku
- 1941–46: Not Played
- 1947: Pischevik Baku
- 1948: Pischevik Baku
- 1949: KKF Baku
- 1950: Trudovye Rezervy Baku
- 1951: Zavod im. S.M.Budennogo Baku
- 1952: Zavod im. S.M.Budennogo Baku
- 1953: Dinamo Baku
- 1954: BODO Baku
- 1955: Zavod im. S.M.Budennogo Baku
- 1956: NPU Ordgonikidzeneft Baku
- 1957: Mekhsul Tovuz
- 1958: SK BO PVO Baku
- 1959: Neftyanik Quba
- 1960: ATZ Sumgait
- 1961: NPU Ordgonikidzeneft Baku
- 1962: MOIK Baku
- 1963: MOIK Baku
- 1964: Vostok Baku
- 1965: Vostok Baku
- 1966: Vostok Baku
- 1967: Apsheron Baku
- 1968: Politechnik Mingechaur
- 1969: MOIK Baku
- 1970: MOIK Baku
- 1971: Suruhanez Salyany
- 1972: Izolit Mingechaur
- 1973: MOIK Baku
- 1974: MOIK Baku
- 1975: Suruhanez Baku
- 1976: MOIK Baku
- 1977: Suruhanez Baku
- 1978: MOIK Baku
- 1979: Suruhanez Baku
- 1980: Energetik Ali-Bayramly
- 1981: Gandglik Baku
- 1982: Gandglik Baku
- 1983: FK Vilash Masalli
- 1984: Konditer Gandja
- 1985: Konditer Gandja
- 1986: İnşaatçı Sabirabad
- 1987: Khazar Lankaran
- 1988: Araz Baku
- 1989: Gandglik Baku
- 1990: Qarabağ
- 1991: İnşaatçı Baku

== Finals ==
Year	Venue	Winner	Score	Runner-up
1992	29 August 1992; Baku – Tofiq Bahramov Stadium; Attendance: 4,000	İnşaatçı Baku; Seyran Guseinov 27'; Ilkham Aliev 101'	2 – 1 (aet)	FK Kur; Mekhman Bakhshiev 83'
1993	28 May 1993; Baku – Tofiq Bahramov Stadium; Attendance: 10,500	Qarabağ; Mushfig Huseynov 97'	1 – 0 (aet)	İnşaatçı Sabirabad
1993–94	28 May 1994; Baku – Tofiq Bahramov Stadium; Attendance: 3,500	Kapaz; Djeikhun Tanriverdiev 31'; Fazil Parvarov 62'	2 – 0	Khazar Lankaran
1994–95	28 May 1995; Baku – Tofiq Bahramov Stadium; Attendance: 15,000	Neftçi; Yunis Huseynov 78'	1 – 0	FK Kur
1995–96	15 May 1996; Baku – Tofiq Bahramov Stadium; Attendance: 18,500	Neftçi; Yunis Huseynov 11'; Vidadi Rzayev 78'; Yunis Huseynov 81'	3 – 0	Qarabağ
1996–97	28 May 1997; Baku – Tofiq Bahramov Stadium; Attendance: 6,000	Kapaz; Khalig Mardanov 44'	1 – 0	Khazri Buzovna
1997–98	28 May 1998; Baku – Tofiq Bahramov Stadium; Attendance: 5,500	Kapaz; Badri Kvaratskhelia 21'; Vasif Valiev 52'	2 – 0	Qarabağ
1998–99	28 May 1999; Baku – Tofiq Bahramov Stadium; Attendance: 11,000	Neftçi	0 – 0 (5 – 4 pen.)	Shamkir
1999–00	28 May 2000; Baku – Tofiq Bahramov Stadium; Attendance: 6,000	Kapaz; Ramiz Mammadov 53'; Rovshan Akhmedov 69'	2 – 1	Qarabağ; Bahram Shahguliev 90'
2000–01	25 May 2001; Sumqayit – Mehdi Huseynzade Stadium; Attendance: 1500	Shafa; Ramiz Mammadov 8'; Emin Imamaliev 85'	2 – 1	Neftçi; Samir Aliyev 23'
2001–02*	28 May 2002; Baku – Tofiq Bahramov Stadium; Attendance: 19,000	Neftçi	3 – 0 Forfeit; Shamkir walked off in 84'	Shamkir
2002–03	Due to conflict between almost all clubs and the Association of Football Federations of Azerbaijan, no Cup Competition was held.			
2003–04	9 May 2004; Baku – Tofiq Bahramov Stadium; Attendance: 18,000	Neftçi; Samir Abbasov 104'	1 – 0 (aet)	Shamkir
2004–05	28 May 2005; Baku – Tofiq Bahramov Stadium; Attendance: 10,000	FK Baku; Leandro Gomes 5'; Andrezinho 114'	2 – 1 (aet)	Inter Baku; Uladzimir Makowski 52'
2005–06	3 June 2006; Baku – Shafa; Attendance: 4,000	Qarabağ; Vasif Hakverdiev 45'; Samir Musayev 87'	2 – 1	Karvan; Roman Akhalkatsi 1'
2006–07	28 May 2007; Baku – Tofiq Bahramov Stadium; Attendance: 15,500	Khazar Lankaran; Rashad Karimov 90'	1 – 0	MKT-Araz
2007–08	25 May 2008; Baku – Tofiq Bahramov Stadium; Attendance: 20,000	Khazar Lankaran; Juninho 115'; Juninho 118'	2 – 0 (aet)	Inter Baku
2008–09	23 May 2009; Baku – Tofiq Bahramov Stadium; Attendance: 5,500	Qarabağ; Vagif Javadov 57'	1 – 0	Inter Baku
2009–10	22 May 2010; Baku – Tofiq Bahramov Stadium; Attendance: 26,000	FK Baku; Veaceslav Sofroni 93'; Aleksandar Solic 103'	2 – 1 (aet)	Khazar Lankaran; Elvin Beqiri 120'
2010–11	24 May 2011; Baku – Tofiq Bahramov Stadium; Attendance: 10,000	Khazar Lankaran; Winston Parks 91'	1 – 1 (4 – 2 pen.)	Inter Baku; Ģirts Karlsons 100'
2011–12	17 May 2012; Baku – Dalga Arena; Attendance: 4,300	FC Baku; Koke 8'; Juninho 27'	2 – 0	Neftçi
2012–13	28 May 2013; Baku – Tofiq Bahramov Stadium; Attendance: 29,500	Neftçi	0 – 0 (5 – 3 pen.)	Khazar Lankaran
2013–14	22 May 2014; Baku – Tofiq Bahramov Stadium; Attendance: 20,000	Neftçi; Samir Masimov 52'	1 – 1 (3 – 2 pen.)	Gabala; Marat Izmailov 71'
2014–15	3 June 2015; Gabala – Gabala City Stadium; Attendance: 4,500	Qarabağ; Reynaldo 5'; Reynaldo 39'; Muarem Muarem 85'	3 – 1	Neftçi; Ernest Webnje Nfor 77'
2015–16	25 May 2016; Baku – Tofiq Bahramov Stadium; Attendance: 25,500	Qarabağ	1 – 0 (aet)	Neftçi
2016–17	5 May 2017; Nakhchivan – Nakhchivan City Stadium; Attendance: 12,800	Qarabağ; Mahir Madatov 52'; Urfan Abbasov 68' (o.g.)	2 – 0	Gabala
2017–18	28 May 2018; Qabala – Gabala City Stadium; Attendance: 4,500	Keşla; Pardis Fardjad-Azad 71'	1 – 0	Gabala
2018–19	19 May 2019; Nakhchivan – Nakhchivan City Stadium; Attendance: 10,000	Gabala; Steeven Joseph-Monrose 3'	1 – 0	Sumgayit
2019–20	Cup Competition was abandoned due to the COVID-19 pandemic.			
2020–21	24 May 2021; Masazir – Bank Respublika Arena	Keşla; Shahriyar Aliyev 37'; Mijusko Bojovic 57'	2 – 1	Sumgayit; Mijusko Bojovic 3' (o.g.)
2021–22	27 May 2022; Qabala – Gabala City Stadium	Qarabağ; Abdellah Zoubir 69'	1 – 1 (4 – 3 pen.)	Zira; Hamidou Keyta 17'
2022–23	3 June 2023; Baku – Bakcell Arena	Gabala; Alimi 102'	1 – 0 (aet)	Neftçi
2023–24	2 June 2024; Baku – Dalga Arena	Qarabağ; Juninho 42'; Abdellah Zoubir 62'	2 – 1	Zira; Ibrahimli 58'
2024–25	31 May 2025; Sumgait – Sumgayit City Stadium	Sabah; Šafranko 36' (pen.); Parris 90+7'; Mutallimov 119'	3 – 2 (aet)	Qarabağ; Kady 45+1'; Irazabal 67' (o.g.)
2025–26	13 May 2026; Baku – Neftçi Arena	Sabah; Mbina 70'; Mickels 90+1'	2 – 1	Zira; Aydın 4'

Note

- The Azerbaijan Cup held in 2001–02 was suspended due to the clashes between clubs and AFFA. The clubs themselves then made an alternative cup. The ultimate winner of the cup was Neftçi. However, the result of an alternative tournament that season is not officially recognized.

== Performance ==
=== Performance by club ===
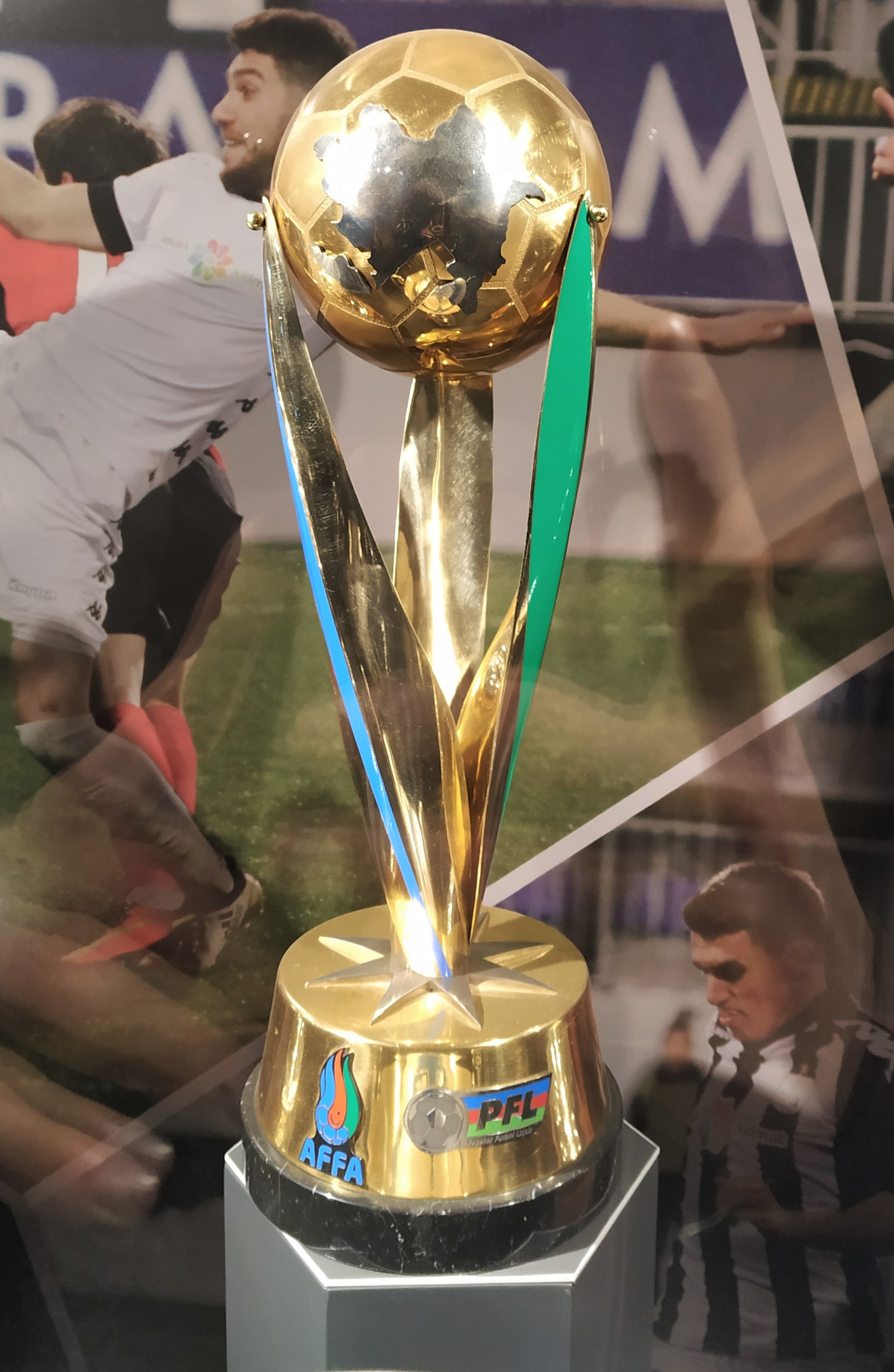
Azerbaijan Cup trophy

Clubs in italic are defunct.

Club	Winners	Runner-up	Winning years
Qarabağ	8	4	1993, 2005–06, 2008–09, 2014–15, 2015–16, 2016–17, 2021–22, 2023–24
Neftçi	6	5	1994–95, 1995–96, 1998–99, 2003–04, 2012–13, 2013–14
Kapaz	4	–	1993–94, 1996–97, 1997–98, 1999–2000
Khazar Lankaran	3	3	2006–07, 2007–08, 2010–11
FC Baku	3	–	2004–05, 2009–10, 2011–12
Keşla (Note: Keşla record includes four runners-up appearances as FC Inter Baku.)	2	4	2017–18, 2020–21
Gabala	2	3	2018–19, 2022–23
Sabah	2	–	2024–25, 2025–26
İnşaatçı Baku	1	–	1992
Shafa	1	–	2000–01
Zira	–	3	–
Shamkir	–	2	–
FK Kur	–	2	–
Sumgayit	–	2	–
İnşaatçı Sabirabad	–	1	–
Khazri Buzovna	–	1	–
Karvan	–	1	–
MKT-Araz	–	1	–
