= Pasha Aliyev =

Azerbaijani footballer

Personal information
- Full name: Pasha Aliyev
- Place of birth: Azerbaijan
- Position: Defender

Senior career*
Years	Team	Apps	(Gls)
1993–1997	Khazri Buzovna	99	(29)
1997–1998	Neftchi Baku	17	(3)
1999–2001	Dinamo Baku	39	(21)
2001–2002	Aboomoslem	20	(3)
2003–2004	Dinamo Baku	11	(6)
2004	Khazar Lankaran	12	(3)
2005	Shamkir	16	(4)
2005	Baku	3	(0)
2006	Kapaz	10	(5)
2008–2009	Bakili Baku	4	(0)
- * Club domestic league appearances and goals as of 6 February 2014

Pasha Aliyev (Persian: پاشا علیف, Russian: Паша Алиев) is a retired Azerbaijani footballer who played as a defender.

== Honours ==
- Top Goal Scorer: Azerbaijan Premier League with 12 goals for Dynamo-Bakili Baku.
- Winner: AK Cup 2001, Mashhad, Iran with F.C. Aboomoslem.
