= Milan Zagorac =

Serbian footballer

Personal information
- Date of birth: 15 June 1980 (age 46)
- Place of birth: Pančevo, SFR Yugoslavia
- Height: 1.84 m (6 ft 0 in)
- Position: Defender

Youth career
- –1997: Bečej
- 1997–1998: BSK Batajnica
- 1998–2000: Dinamo Pančevo

Senior career*
Years	Team	Apps	(Gls)
2000–2001	1. FC Schweinfurt 05		
2001–2002	Dinamo Pančevo	28	(1)
2002–2003	OFK Beograd	1	(0)
2003–2004	Desna Chernihiv	25	(0)
2003–2004	Borysfen Boryspil	0	(0)
2004–2005	Kryvbas	23	(0)
2005–2010	Inter Baku	53	(5)
2010–2011	Zemun	5	(0)
2010–2011	→ Srem Jakovo (loan)	13	(0)
2011–2013	Radnički Nova Pazova	42	(0)
2013	Inđija	10	(0)
2014	Dinamo Pančevo	13	(0)
2014	BSK Batajnica		
Total		213	(6)
- * Club domestic league appearances and goals

Milan Zagorac (Serbian Cyrillic: Милан Загорац; born 15 June 1980) is a Serbian former professional footballer who played as a defender.

== Career ==
Zagorac played for OFK Beograd before becoming the first foreign player to sign for FC Desna Chernihiv in 2003.

He also played with FK BSK Batajnica in the 1997–98 Serbian League Belgrade.

Zagorac signed with FC Inter Baku and played in the Azerbaijan Premier League between 2005 and 2010. He made appearances for Inter Baku in the 2008-2009 UEFA Champions League qualifiers and in the 2009–10 UEFA Europa League. Inter Baku was defeated by Partizan 3–1 on aggregate in the Champions League in 2008, with Zagorac playing in both matches. Inter Baku then subsequently lost 2–1 to Spartak Trnava in the Europa League on 2 July 2009.

== Honours ==
Radnički Nova Pazova

- Serbian League Vojvodina: 2011–12

Inter Baku

- Azerbaijan Premier League: 2009–10

Desna Chernihiv

- Ukrainian Second League runner-up: 2003–04
