= Zaur Hashimov =

Azerbaijani footballer and manager (born 1981)

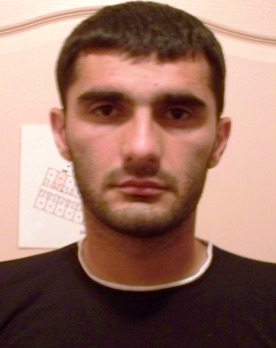

Personal information
- Full name: Zaur Tahir oglu Hashimov
- Date of birth: 25 August 1981 (age 45)
- Place of birth: Sumqayit, Soviet Union
- Height: 1.80 m (5 ft 11 in)
- Position: Defender

Senior career*
Years	Team	Apps	(Gls)
1997–1998	Azerbaijan U-18	14	(0)
1998–2001	Shafa Baku	47	(7)
2001–2004	Khazar Universiteti Baku	47	(4)
2004–2007	Inter Baku	60	(5)
2007	Khazar Lankaran	11	(0)
2008–2013	Qarabağ	86	(2)
2013–2014	Sumgayit	2	(0)

International career^{‡}
1998–2007	Azerbaijan	19	(0)

Managerial career
- 2016–2017: Zira (assistant manager)
- 2018: Azerbaijan U18
- 2019–2020: Zira
- * Club domestic league appearances and goals as of 17 July 2020 ‡ National team caps and goals as of 23 September 2015

Zaur Hashimov (Azerbaijani: Zaur Həşimov; born 25 August 1981) is an Azerbaijani football manager and former player who played as a defender.

== Career ==
=== Club ===
Hashimov began his career with the Azerbaijan U-18 team when they participated in the Azerbaijan Top League. Hashimov later went on to represent Shafa Baku, Khazar Universiteti Baku, Inter Baku, Khazar Lankaran, Qarabağ and Sumgayit over his 17-year career.

=== International ===
Hashimov made his debut for the national team in 1998, making 19 appearances for his country.

== Managerial career ==
On 13 December 2017, Hashimov was appointed as manager of Azerbaijan U18.

== National team statistics ==
Azerbaijan national team
Year	Apps	Goals
1998	1	0
1999	0	0
2000	0	0
2001	0	0
2002	0	0
2003	0	0
2004	1	0
2005	2	0
2006	6	0
2007	9	0
Total	19	0

== Honours ==
Shafa Baku

- Azerbaijan Cup (1): 2000–01

Qarabağ

- Azerbaijan Cup (1): 2008–09
