= Aftandil Hacıyev =

Azerbaijani footballer and manager (born 1981)

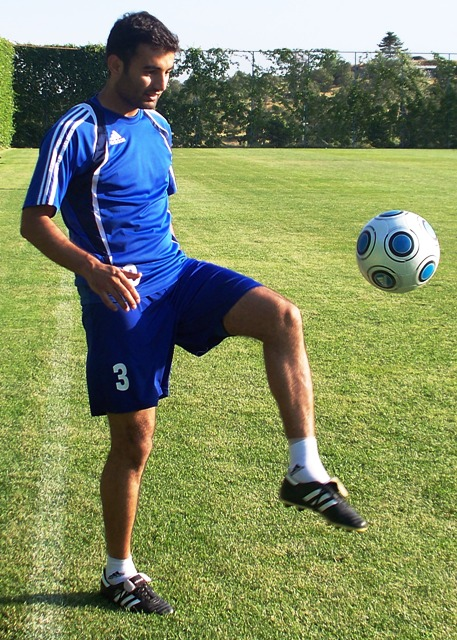

Personal information
- Full name: Aftandil Sabir oğlu Hacıyev
- Date of birth: 13 August 1981 (age 45)
- Place of birth: Baku, Soviet Union
- Height: 1.84 m (6 ft 0 in)
- Position: Defender

Senior career*
Years	Team	Apps	(Gls)
1998–2004	Shafa Baku	86	(7)
2004–2005	Turan Tovuz	38	(5)
2005–2007	Neftchi Baku	25	(0)
2007–2011	FK Qarabağ	78	(3)
2011–2012	Turan Tovuz	20	(0)
2012	Sumgayit PFC	13	(1)

International career
2000–2006	Azerbaijan	22	(0)

Managerial career
- 2015–2018: Qarabağ Reserves
- 2018–2022: Sabail
- * Club domestic league appearances and goals

Aftandil Sabir oğlu Hacıyev (born 13 August 1981) is an Azerbaijani football manager and a former defender. Hacıyev made 22 appearances for the Azerbaijan national football team from 2000 through 2006.

== National team statistics ==
Azerbaijan national team
Year	Apps	Goals
2000	1	0
2001	0	0
2002	0	0
2003	1	0
2004	7	0
2005	10	0
2006	3	0
Total	22	0
