= Daniel Akhtyamov =

Azerbaijani footballer (born 1985)

Daniel Axtyamov
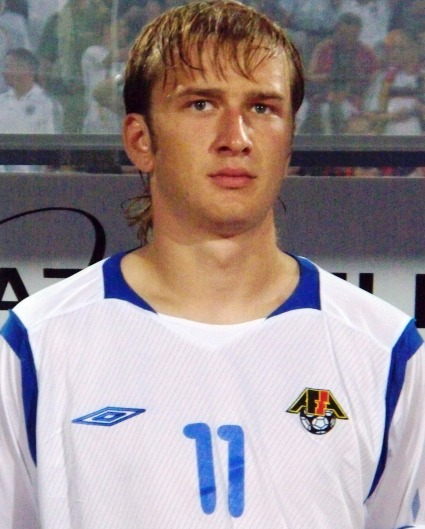
- Daniel Akhtyamov in 2007

Personal information
- Full name: Daniel Rasimovich Akhtyamov
- Date of birth: 26 March 1985 (age 41)
- Place of birth: Tashkent, Uzbek SSR
- Height: 1.88 m (6 ft 2 in)
- Position: Forward

Youth career
- Chilanzar
- Lokomotiv Moscow

Senior career*
Years	Team	Apps	(Gls)
2003	Severstal Cherepovets	7	(0)
2004	Vityaz Podolsk	8	(0)
2004–2005	Inter Baku	17	(1)
2005–2006	Gäncä	13	(4)
2006	Olimpik Baku	8	(0)
2006–2007	Inter Baku	21	(2)
2008	Torpedo Moscow	15	(2)
2008	Sheksna Cherepovets	10	(2)
2009	Minsk	3	(0)
2009	Simurq Zaqatala	3	(0)
2012	Tiraspol	10	(1)
2012–2013	Cherepovets		
2013–2014	Titan Klin		
2015–2016	Khimik Klin		

International career^{‡}
2004–2009	Azerbaijan	13	(0)
- * Club domestic league appearances and goals as of 1 February 2013 ‡ National team caps and goals as of 1 February 2013

Daniel Axtyamov (Russian: Даниэль Расимович Ахтямов; born 26 March 1985) is an Uzbek-born Azerbaijani former professional footballer.
