= Tony Alegbe =

Nigerian footballer

Personal information
- Full name: Anthony Benson Alegbe
- Date of birth: 10 October 1981 (age 45)
- Place of birth: Nigeria
- Height: 1.78 m (5 ft 10 in)
- Position: Defender

Senior career*
| Years | Team | Apps | (Gls) |
| 1999 | Shooting Stars | 20 | (2) |
| 2000 | Kwara United | 21 | (4) |
| 2001 | Enyimba International | 1 | (0) |
| 2001–2003 | Metalurh Donetsk | 34 | (0) |
| 2003–2005 | Kryvbas Kryvyi Rih | 57 | (3) |
| 2005–2008 | Karpaty Lviv | 2 | (0) |
| 2006–2007 | → Inter Baku (loan) | 18 | (2) |
| 2009–2011 | Wikki Tourists | 40 | (1) |
| 2011–2012 | FUS Rabat | 31 | (4) |
| 2012–2013 | TSG Neustrelitz | | |

International career
| 2003 | Nigeria | 1 | (0) |
- * Club domestic league appearances and goals

Anthony Alegbe (born 10 October 1981) is a Nigerian former footballer.

== Career ==
=== Club ===
Alegbe played in 1999 with Shooting Stars F.C. in the CAF Champions League. He had earlier left FC Karpaty Lviv of Ukraine in December 2008, and returned to Nigeria and signed with Wikki Tourists F.C.

=== International ===
His first call for the Super Eagles was on 1 November 2002.

== Career statistics ==
=== International ===
Nigeria national team
| Year | Apps | Goals |
|---|---|---|
| 2003 | 1 | 0 |
| Total | 1 | 0 |

Statistics accurate as of 21 June 2016
