= Nikola Jolović (footballer) =

Serbian footballer

Personal information
- Full name: Nikola Jolović
- Date of birth: 4 May 1979 (age 47)
- Place of birth: Belgrade, SFR Yugoslavia
- Height: 1.87 m (6 ft 2 in)
- Position: Defender

Senior career*
Years	Team	Apps	(Gls)
1996–1998	BSK Batajnica	32	(4)
1998–2001	Zemun	69	(4)
2001–2005	Torpedo Moscow	64	(2)
2005	Saturn	12	(1)
2006–2007	Inter Bakı	11	(0)
2008	Čukarički	2	(0)
2009	OFK Beograd	18	(1)

International career
2000–2001	FR Yugoslavia U21	6	(1)
- * Club domestic league appearances and goals

Nikola Jolović (Serbian Cyrillic: Никола Јоловић; born 4 May 1979) is a Serbian retired professional footballer who played as a defender.

== Club career ==
Jolović spent three seasons with Zemun, before transferring to Russian club Torpedo Moscow in the summer of 2001. He stayed there until the summer of 2005, before moving to Saturn. Jolović also played for Azerbaijani club Inter Baku, before returning to his homeland in 2008. He finished his football career after playing with Čukarički and OFK Beograd in the Serbian SuperLiga.

== International career ==
Jolović made six appearances and scored one goal for the Yugoslav national under-21 team during the qualification campaign for the 2002 UEFA Under-21 Championship.

== Career statistics ==
Season	Club	Division	Apps	Goals
Yugoslavia			League	
1998–99	Zemun	D1	9	1
1999–00	Zemun	D1	31	2
2000–01	Zemun	D1	29	1
Russia			League	
2001	Torpedo Moscow	D1	7	1
2002	Torpedo Moscow	D1	25	1
2003	Torpedo Moscow	D1	24	0
2004	Torpedo Moscow	D1	5	0
2005	Torpedo Moscow	D1	3	0
2005	Saturn	D1	12	1
Azerbaijan			League	
2006–07	Inter Baku	D1	10	0
2007–08	Inter Baku	D1	1	0
Serbia			League	
2008–09	Čukarički	D1	2	0
2008–09	OFK Beograd	D1	12	1
2009–10	OFK Beograd	D1	6	0
Yugoslavia			69	4
Russia			76	3
Azerbaijan			11	0
Serbia			20	1
Total			176	8
