= Aliyar Ismailov =

Russian footballer and coach

Personal information
- Full name: Aliyar Ferzulakhovich Ismailov
- Date of birth: 11 April 1976 (age 50)
- Place of birth: Kaspiysk, Russian SFSR
- Height: 1.66 m (5 ft 5 1/2 in)
- Positions: Defender; midfielder

Team information
- Current team: FC Anzhi Makhachkala (assistant coach)

Senior career*
Years	Team	Apps	(Gls)
1993–1994	FC Argo Kaspiysk	61	(6)
1995–1996	FC Anzhi-2 Kaspiysk	55	(17)
1997	FC Anzhi Makhachkala	1	(0)
1997	FC Anzhi-d Makhachkala	44	(4)
1998	FC Lokomotiv-Taim Mineralnye Vody	38	(4)
1998–1999	PFC Turan Tovuz	1	(0)
1999–2000	FK Karabakh	13	(2)
2000–2001	PFC Turan Tovuz	9	(1)
2001–2005	FC Dynamo Makhachkala	174	(23)
2005–2010	FC Inter Baku	25	(2)
2011	FC Biolog-Novokubansk Progress	13	(1)
2011–2013	FC Dagdizel Kaspiysk	51	(2)

Managerial career
- 2020–: FC Anzhi Makhachkala (assistant)
- * Club domestic league appearances and goals

Aliyar Ferzulakhovich Ismailov (Russian: Алияр Ферзулахович Исмаилов; born 11 April 1976) is a Russian professional football coach and a former player. He is an assistant coach with FC Anzhi Makhachkala.

== Club career ==
He made his Russian Football National League debut for FC Anzhi Makhachkala on 6 September 1997 in a game against FC Lokomotiv Chita. He played 2 more seasons in the FNL for FC Dynamo Makhachkala.
