= Aykhan Abbasov =

Azerbaijani footballer and manager (born 1981)

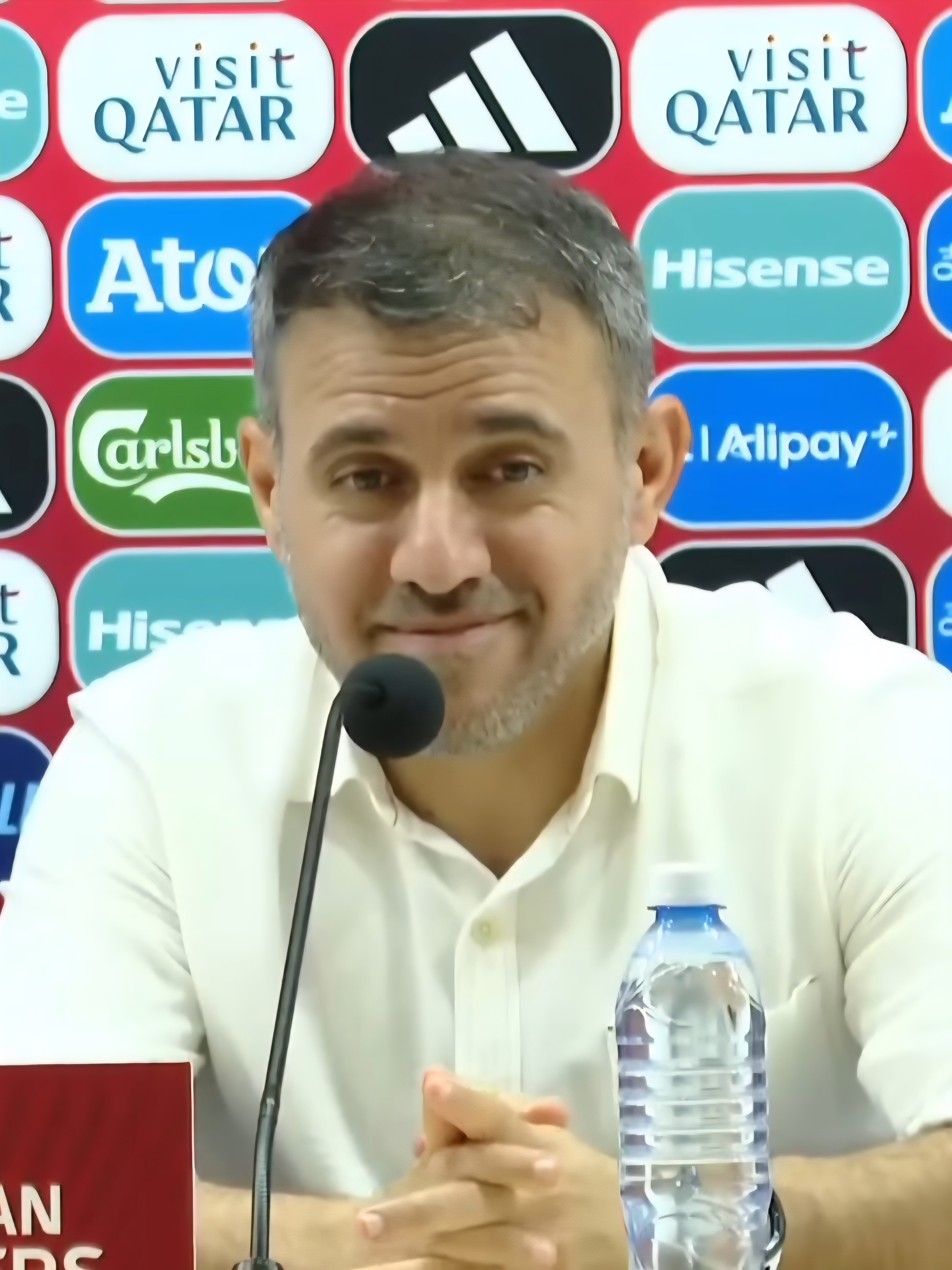
- Abbasov in 2025

Personal information
- Full name: Aykhan Farzukh oglu Abbasov
- Date of birth: 25 August 1981 (age 45)
- Place of birth: Baku, Azerbaijan SSR
- Height: 1.64 m (5 ft 5 in)
- Position: Midfielder

Team information
- Current team: Azerbaijan (manager)

Youth career
- Khazri Buzovna

Senior career*
Years	Team	Apps	(Gls)
1996–1997	Khazri Buzovna	1	(0)
1998–2001	Shafa Baku	63	(2)
2002	OIK	8	(0)
2003–2004	Shafa Baku	23	(0)
2004–2005	Turan Tovuz	39	(2)
2006–2007	Inter Baku	25	(0)
2007	Mil-Muğan	0	(0)
2007–2011	Qarabağ	49	(2)
2011–2012	Turan Tovuz	16	(0)

International career
1997–1998	Azerbaijan U18	19	(1)
2001–2002	Azerbaijan U21		

Managerial career
- 2015–2016: Zira (assistant)
- 2016–2018: Zira
- 2018–2021: Sumgayit
- 2022–2024: Turan Tovuz
- 2024–2026: Şamaxı
- 2025: Azerbaijan U-21
- 2025–: Azerbaijan
- * Club domestic league appearances and goals

Aykhan Abbasov (Azerbaijani: Ayxan Fərzux oğlu Abbasov; born 25 August 1981) is an Azerbaijani professional football manager and former midfielder. He is the head coach of the Azerbaijani national football team.

== Early life and footballing career ==
Abbasov was born on 25 August 1981 in the Azerbaijani capital of Baku, specifically in Khazar. He started playing football at the age of 7 in Buzovna, playing for the U-18 team in 1997. Until 2002 he also played for Shafa Baku FK and the same year, went to play at MOIK Baku on a loan. From 2004 until 2007 he played for Turan Tovuz and Inter Baku (now Şamaxı FK). In his youth, Abbasov also participated in playing for the Azerbaijani junior (U-17) and youth (U-19) teams. In 2007, he began playing for MKT-Araz (now İmişli FK), where he left the club after that same season after the manager and club got into problems, playing for Qarabağ from then on until going back to Turan Tuvaz in 2011.

== Coaching career ==
On 27 December 2016, Abbasov was appointed as manager of Zira FK until the end of the 2016–17 season.

On 16 December 2021, Abbasov left his role as head coach of Sumgayit.

On March 14, 2025, he was appointed the head coach of the Azerbaijan national U-21 football team, and AFFA signed a two-year contract with him.

For the Ukraine–Azerbaijan game in the 2026 World Cup qualification, he was appointed as caretaker of the Azerbaijani national football team, after Fernando Santos was sacked the game before. With him, Azerbaijan went from losing 5–0 to Iceland to drawing 1–1 with Ukraine, which led to him being appointed as the main manager of Azerbaijan. Under him, Azerbaijan played France twice, losing both games 3-0 and 3–1, though this was met by approval from fans and the board, especially after Azerbaijan scored an early leading goal against France.

Abbasov also led Azerbaijan to their first ever victory after 16 games, with their 6-1 result against Saint Lucia also being Azerbaijan's greatest victory ever. Shortly after, Azerbaijan faced Sierra Leone in the final of the 2026 FIFA Series, defeating them in a penalty shootout and becoming champions. Aykhan Abbasov and the national team have since then been praised multiple times by the public in Azerbaijan.
