= Ismayil Mammadov =

Azerbaijani footballer (born 1976)

Personal information
- Full name: Ismayil Mammadov
- Date of birth: 5 August 1976 (age 50)
- Place of birth: Soviet Union
- Height: 1.73 m (5 ft 8 in)
- Position: Midfielder

Team information
- Current team: Karvan

Senior career*
Years	Team	Apps	(Gls)
1992–1997	Khazar Sumgayit	93	(18)
1997–1998	MOIK Baki	23	(6)
1998–1999	Khazar Sumgayit	22	(9)
1999–2002	Shamkir	57	(14)
2003–2004	Neftçi Baku	13	(5)
2004–2005	Qarabağ	31	(4)
2005–2006	Karvan	26	(5)
2006–2007	Inter Baku	21	(4)
2007	Standard Baku	11	(1)
2008	Genclerbirliyi Sumqayit	9	(3)
2008–2009	MOIK Baki	18	(4)
2009–2012	Karvan	26	(3)

International career^{‡}
2002–2005	Azerbaijan	7	(0)
- * Club domestic league appearances and goals as of 17 July 2009 ‡ National team caps and goals as of 1 December 2009

Ismayil Mammadov (born 5 August 1976) is an Azerbaijani footballer who plays for FK Karvan.
