= Emin Imamaliev =

Azerbaijani footballer (born 1980)

Emin İmaməliyev
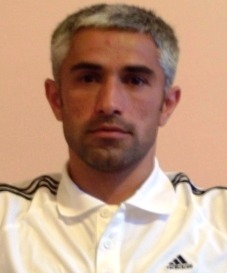

Personal information
- Date of birth: 7 August 1980 (age 46)
- Place of birth: Baku, Soviet Union
- Height: 1.67 m (5 ft 6 in)
- Position: Midfielder

Senior career*
Years	Team	Apps	(Gls)
1998–2003	Shafa Baku	91	(27)
2003–2005	Qarabağ	28	(4)
2005–2006	FK Baku	25	(3)
2006–2008	Inter Baku	39	(7)
2008–2013	Qarabağ	52	(8)
2012	→ Kəpəz	10	(0)
2013–2014	Araz		

International career^{‡}
2000–2007	Azerbaijan	41	(1)
- * Club domestic league appearances and goals as of 16 September 2013 ‡ National team caps and goals as of 26 March 2008

Emin Imamaliev (Azerbaijani: Emin Atabala oğlu İmaməliyev; born 7 August 1980 in Baku) is an Azerbaijani football midfielder who most recently played for FK Qarabağ in the AFFA Supreme League.

He has been capped 41 times for the Azerbaijan national football team. His only international goal secured Azerbaijan's 1–0 victory over Finland in a UEFA Euro 2008 qualifier in Baku.

== National team statistics ==
Azerbaijan national team
Year	Apps	Goals
2000	2	0
2001	3	0
2002	9	0
2003	7	0
2004	1	0
2005	3	0
2006	8	0
2007	8	1
Total	41	1

=== International goals ===
#	Date	Venue	Opponent	Score	Result	Competition
1.	28 March 2007	Baku, Azerbaijan	Finland	1–0	1–0	Euro 2008 Qual.

== Honors ==
FC Baku

- Azerbaijan Premier League: 2005–06
