= Azerbaijan Regional League =

- Founded: 2017; 9 years ago
- Country: Azerbaijan
- Level on pyramid: 4
- Promotion to: Second League
- Relegation to: Amateur League
- Current champions: Khankendi (2024–25)
- Most championships: Ugur Sumgayit (2 times)
- Website: http://www.affa.az
- Current: 2024–25 Azerbaijan Regional League

The Azerbaijan Regional League (Azerbaijani: Azərbaycan Region Liqası) is the fourth tier of football in the Azerbaijani football league system. Regional League is run by the Association of Football Federations of Azerbaijan (AFFA).

== Teams ==
Azerbaijan Regional League is divided into 5 zones.

=== Capital and North ===
Capital and North

Note: Table lists in alphabetical order.

Team	Location	Stadium
Irevan FK	Baku	
ICBFA	Baku	Shagany Olympic Complex
Davam	Baku	
Shirvanovka FK	Qusar	Shirvanovka Stadium
Qusar FK	Qusar	
Shahdag Quba	Quba	
Jabrayil FK	Jabrayil	
Dirchelis FK	Baku	
Mubariz	Jabrayil	

=== Northwest and West ===
Northwest and West

Team	Location
Energetik PFK	Mingachevir
Göyazan PFK	Qazakh
Agstafa FK	Agstafa
Qoshqar	Ganja
Shaki FC	Shaki
Ganja	Ganja
Karvan FK	Yevlakh

=== Centre ===
Centre

Team	Location	Stadium
Agsu City	Agsu	Aghsu Central Stadium
Saatly Araz	Saatly	Saatly Olympic Sports Complex
Imishli FC	Imishli	Imishli Olympic Sports Complex
Mil	Beylagan	Beylagan Olympic Sports Complex
Fuzuli	Fuzuli	Horadiz City Stadium
Ismayilli	Ismayilli	Ismayilli City Stadium

=== South ===
South

Team	Location	Stadium
Khan Lankaran	Lankaran	Khazar Lankaran Central Stadium
Astara FC	Astara	Suparibağ Stadium
Erkivan	Masally	Masally Central Stadium
Gobustan	Gobustan	Gobustan Stadium
Ümid FK	Jalilabad	Jalilabad Central Stadium

Note: Khan Lankaran will be Khazar Lankaran FK from the 2022-23 season.

=== Nakhchivan ===
Nakhchivan

Team	Location	Stadium
Araz	Nakhchivan	Nakhchivan Central Stadium
Alinja	Julfa	
Arpachay	Sharur	Sharur Central Stadium
Babek FC	Babek	
Dubendi	Ordubad	
Kangarli FC	Kangarli	
Sadarak FC	Sadarak	
Batabat	Shahbuz	

== Champions ==
Season	Champions	Runners-up
2017–18	Ughur FK	Energetik FK
2018–19	Ughur FK	Shahdag Qusar
2021-22	Jabrayil FK	Khan Lankaran FK
2022-23	Qusar FK	Cinar-Zengilan
2023-24	Shimal FK	Hypers Guba
2024-25	Khankendi FK	Shirvan FK

== See also ==
- Azerbaijan Premier League
- Azerbaijan First Division
- AFFA Amateur League
- Azerbaijan Cup
- Football in Azerbaijan
