= Football in Azerbaijan =

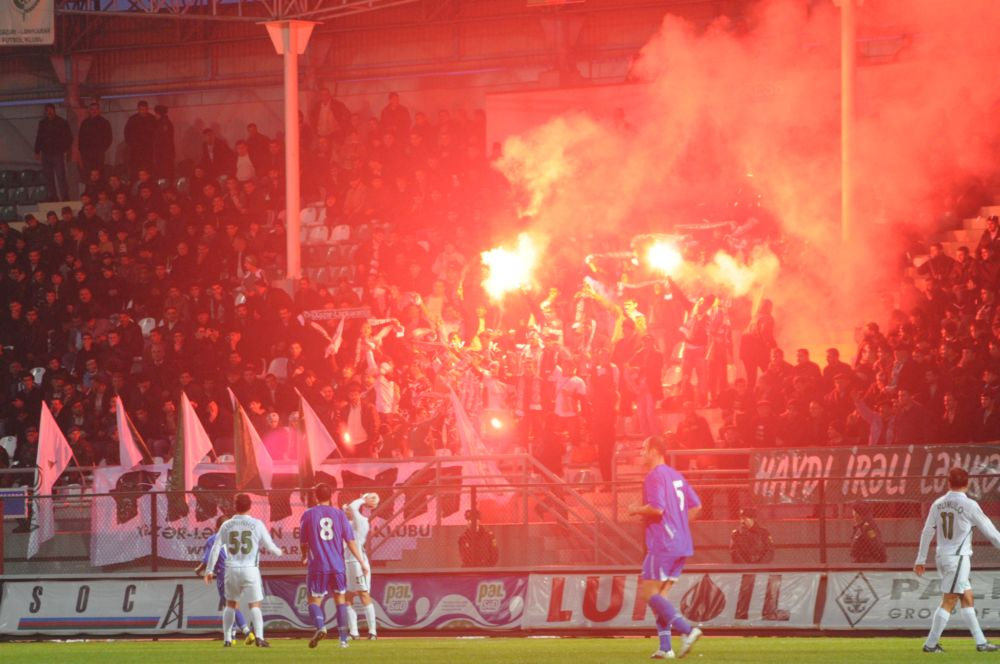
- Khazar Lankaran fans during a football game.
- Country: Azerbaijan
- Governing body: Association of Football Federations of Azerbaijan
- National teams: Azerbaijan national football team Azerbaijan women's national football team

International competitions
- Champions League; Europa League; Conference League; Super Cup; FIFA Club World Cup; FIFA Intercontinental Cup; FIFA World Cup (national team); UEFA European Championship (national team); UEFA Nations League (national team); FIFA Women's World Cup (national team); UEFA Women's Championship (national team); UEFA Women's Nations League (national team)

Football is the most popular sport in Azerbaijan. Azeri football is organized by the Association of Football Federations of Azerbaijan, or AFFA, which runs the national, professional football league, the AFFA Supreme League, the men's national football team, the women's national team and various youth levels.

The national teams take part in all competitions organised by FIFA and UEFA at both senior and youth levels. Neftchi Baku used to be one of the leading teams in the former top league in the Soviet Union, sometimes playing in European club competitions. Their most famous player arguably was Anatoly Banishevski, who was also a member of the Soviet team, that reached the semi-finals in the 1966 FIFA World Cup. Another Azerbaijani footballing legend is also part of football history: Tofiq Bahramov was the linesman who played a crucial role in the 1966 FIFA World Cup Final between England and West Germany. Their women's league has been more irregular, with only youth levels being run in several seasons.

== History ==
=== Early period (before 1920s) ===
In the early twentieth century, football began to become popular in Azerbaijan, which was then part of the Russian Empire.

Within a short period of time many football teams were established in the capital Baku. In 1905, the first football teams were created in Azerbaijan. These teams mainly represented the major oil companies of Baku. Among these teams were the "Circle of Football Players of Surakhany", "Stela", "Friends of Sport", "Sportsman", "Congress", "Unitas", "Belaya", "Senturion", "Progress", etc. . Initially, the city championships were held by an agreement between the captains in the absence of cup competitions, in a spontaneous manner.

In 1911, the first official championship was held in Baku and resulted in the victory of the "British Club" team. In 1912, Azerbaijani football players had their first "international match" and they won in Tbilisi, Georgia against the local "Sokol" team with 4:2. During 1912-1913, matches between Azerbaijani and Georgian football teams were organized, first in Tbilisi and then in Baku. In 1914 the Football Union was founded in Azerbaijan. The Football Union undertook the organization of official city championships and other competitions.

=== Soviet era (1920s–1991) ===
The oldest records of football teams in Soviet Azerbaijan goes back to 1926-1927, when Trans-Caucasian Championship was organized in Tbilisi. Three South Caucasian countries participated: Azerbaijan, Armenia and Georgia. The Azerbaijan national football team held its first friendly matches against Georgia and Armenia in 1927 for the Trans-Caucasian Championship in Georgia. During the Soviet era the team did not play any international matches.

In 1926 Tehran XI (selected players from Tehran Club, Toofan F.C. and Armenian Sports Club) traveled across the border to Baku, this was the first away football match for an Iranian team. In 1929 it was time for a return visit, and so a team from Baku was invited to play in Tehran in late November.

| autumn 1926 Friendly | Baku XI | 2 – 0 | Tehran XI | Baku |

| autumn 1926 Friendly | Azerbaijan Polytechnical Institute | 0 – 0 | Tehran XI | Baku |

| autumn 1926 Friendly | Baku Youth XI | 4 – 3 | Tehran XI | Baku |

| autumn 1926 Friendly | Taraqi Baku | 3 – 1 | Tehran XI | Baku |

| Nov 1929 Friendly | Tehran XI | 0 – 4 | Baku XI | Tehran, Iran |

| Nov 1929 Friendly | Tehran XI | 1 – 4 | Baku XI | Tehran, Iran |

| Nov 1929 Friendly | Tehran XI | 0 – 11 | Baku XI | Tehran, Iran |

The 1960s is considered the Golden Age for Azerbaijani football as it produced great players like Anatoliy Banishevskiy, Alakbar Mammadov and the football referee Tofik Bakhramov, most famous for being the linesman who helped to award a goal for England in the 1966 World Cup Final between England and West Germany.

The main stadia in Azerbaijan were built during the Soviet era, most notably the largest and most important of which are the Tofig Bahramov Stadium in Baku, Ganja City Stadium in Ganja, Mehdi Huseynzade Stadium in Sumqayit, Lankaran City Stadium in Lankaran, among others. After independence, many of these stadia were renovated and modernized or are currently undergoing renovation and modernization.

Most football clubs were also founded during the Soviet era, the most prominent of which are, Neftchi Baku PFC, FC Baku, Kapaz PFC, Sumgayit PFC, FK Khazar Lankaran, FK Shamkir, among others.

== National teams ==
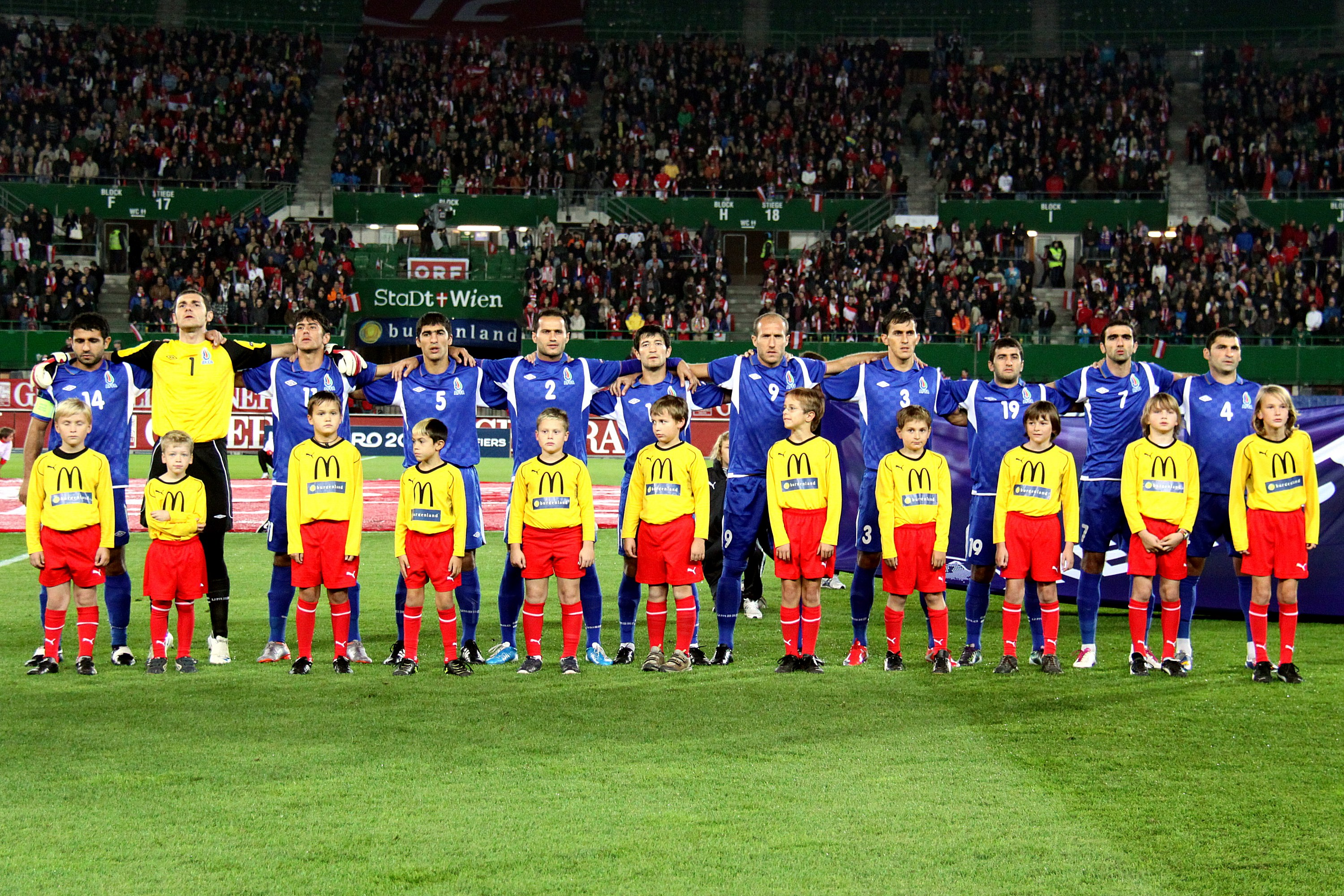
Azerbaijan national football team in October 2010.

The Azerbaijan national football team is the national football team of Azerbaijan and is controlled by the Association of Football Federations of Azerbaijan. After the split of the Soviet Union, the team played its first international match against Georgia on September 17, 1992. They have taken part in qualification for each major tournament since Euro 96, but so far has never qualified for the finals tournament of any World Cup or European Championships.

The Azerbaijan women's national football team played its first international match against Romania on November 18, 2006. Their competitive participation has been limited, with attempts to qualify for Euro 2009 and the 2011 FIFA World Cup, but then no matches until qualification for Euro 2022, though they did enter World Cup qualification for 2023 after that. So far they have never qualified for a major tournament finals.

An under-21 team, an under-19 team, an under-17 team, a women's under-19 team and a women's under-17 team also compete.

Gurban Gurbanov is Azerbaijan's all-time leading goalscorer in international matches with 66 caps and 14 goals.

== League system ==
| Level | League(s) / Division(s) | | | |
|---|---|---|---|---|
Professional Leagues
| 1 | Premyer Liqa; 12 clubs ↓ 1 relegation spot + 1 relegation play-off spot | | | |
| 2 | I Liqa; 10 clubs ↑ 1 promotion spot + 1 promotion play-off spot ↓ 1 relegation spot + 1 relegation play-off spot | | | |
Semi-Professional League
| 3 | II Liqa; 12 clubs ↑ 1 promotion spot + 1 promotion play-off spot ↓ 1 relegation spot + 2 relegation play-off spot | | | |
Non-Professional Leagues
| 4 | Region Liqası; TBD clubs participate from 4 zones 16 club promotion to the final stage ↑ 1 promotion spot + 2 promotion play-off spot | | | |
| 4 | Capital and Northern Zone ↑ 4 promotion to the final stage | Southern Zone ↑ 4 promotion to the final stage | Center Zone ↑ 4 promotion to the final stage | North West and West Zone ↑ 4 promotion to the final stage |

| Level | League(s) |
|---|---|
| 1 | Azerbaijani Women's Football Championship; Irregular, currently defunct |

== Most successful clubs overall ==
As of 28 May 2026

local and lower league organizations are not included.

| Club | Domestic Titles | | | | |
| Club | Azerbaijan Premier League | Azerbaijan Cup | Azerbaijan Supercup | CIS Cup | Total |
|---|---|---|---|---|---|
| Qarabağ | **12** | **8** | 1 | - | **21** |
| Neftçi | 9 | 6 | **2** | **1** | 18 |
| Kapaz | 3 | 4 | - | - | 7 |
| Khazar Lankaran | 1 | 3 | 1 | **1** | 6 |
| Şamaxı | 2 | 2 | - | **1** | 5 |
| Baku | 2 | 3 | - | - | 5 |
| Sabah | 1 | 2 | - | - | 3 |
| Shamkir | 2 | - | - | - | 2 |
| Qabala | - | 2 | - | - | 2 |
| Turan Tovuz | 1 | - | - | - | 1 |
| İnşaatçı Baku | - | 1 | - | - | 1 |
| Shafa Baku | - | 1 | - | - | 1 |

- The articles in italic indicate the defunct leagues and the defunct cups.
- The figures in **bold** indicate the most times this competition has been won by a team.

== Attendances ==
The average attendance per top-flight football league season and the club with the highest average attendance:

| Season | League average | Best club | Best club average |
|---|---|---|---|
| 2015-16 | 2,587 | Kəpəz | 13,369 |

== See also ==
- Azerbaijani football league system
- Azerbaijan national football team
- Azerbaijan women's national football team
- Azerbaijan women's national under-17 football team
- Azerbaijan national under-21 football team
- Azerbaijan national under-19 football team
- List of football clubs in Azerbaijan
