= Azerbaijani football league system =

- Country: Azerbaijan
- Sport: Association football
- Promotion and relegation: Yes (men); No (women and amateur)

National system
- Federation: Association of Football Federations of Azerbaijan
- Confederation: UEFA
- Top division: Premier League (men); AFFA Qadınlar Super Liqası (women); Amateur League (amateur)
- Second division: First League (men)
- Cup competition: Azerbaijan Cup (men)

The Azerbaijani football league system is a series of partially unconnected leagues for Azerbaijani football clubs. Unlike in many other nations, Azerbaijan runs separate concurrent leagues for professional football and amateur football, with no regular promotion or relegation between the professional and amateur leagues.

As of May 2025, Qarabağ are the current record holders with 12 titles.

== Current system ==
=== Professional football ===
The current system has been in place since the creation of the Azerbaijan Premier League at the start of the 2001–02 season. For each division, its official name, sponsored name, and number of clubs are given:

Level	League(s) / Division(s)			
Professional Leagues
1	Premyer Liqa; 12 clubs ↓ 1 relegation spot + 1 relegation play-off spot			
2	I Liqa; 10 clubs ↑ 1 promotion spot + 1 promotion play-off spot ↓ 1 relegation spot + 1 relegation play-off spot			
Semi-Professional League
3	II Liqa; 12 clubs ↑ 1 promotion spot + 1 promotion play-off spot ↓ 1 relegation spot + 2 relegation play-off spot			
Non-Professional Leagues
4	Region Liqası; TBD clubs participate from 4 zones 16 club promotion to the final stage ↑ 1 promotion spot + 2 promotion play-off spot			
4	Capital and Northern Zone ↑ 4 promotion to the final stage	Southern Zone ↑ 4 promotion to the final stage	Center Zone ↑ 4 promotion to the final stage	North West and West Zone ↑ 4 promotion to the final stage

Level	League(s)
1	AFFA Qadınlar Super Liqası; Irregular, currently defunct

=== Amateur football ===
Completely independent from the professional pyramid, there also exists an amateur league system. Azerbaijan's Amateur League is divided into four regions, which include Baku, North, West, and Central Region.

Level	League/Division
1	Azərbaycan Həvəskarlar Liqası; 36 clubs

== Cup eligibility ==
=== Domestic cups ===
All Azerbaijan Premier League and Azerbaijan First Division clubs directly enter the Azerbaijan Cup.

=== European cups ===
From season 2008-09, the top side in the Azerbaijan Premier League qualifies for the second qualifying stage of the Champions League, while the second and third-placed teams qualify for the first qualifying stage of UEFA Europa League. The winners of the Azerbaijan Cup also qualify for the Europa League's second qualifying stage.

While Azeri clubs initially entered the UEFA Women's Champions League from 2003, the removal of the senior league has meant that no Azeri team has competed since 2007.

== See also ==
- League system
- List of football clubs in Azerbaijan
