= 1995–96 Azerbaijan Top League =

Azerbaijan Top League
- Season: 1995–96
- Champions: Neftchi Baku
- UEFA Cup: Neftchi Baku; Khazri Buzovna
- Cup Winners' Cup: Qarabağ
- Matches played: 170
- Top goalscorer: Rovshan Akhmedov; Fazil Parvanov (23)

The 1995–96 Azerbaijan Top League was the fifth season of the Azerbaijan Top League and was contested by 11 clubs and was the first season were 3 points were awarded for a win. Kəpəz were the defending champions but were unable to keep their title as Neftchi Baku completed a domestic double, winning their second Azerbaijan League title and the Azerbaijan Cup.

== Stadia and locations ==
Location of teams in Azerbaijan Premier League 1995–96

Note: Table lists in alphabetical order.

Team	Location	Venue	Capacity
Bakı Fahlasi	Baku	Ismat Gayibov Stadium	5,000
Kapaz	Ganja	Ganja City Stadium	26,120
Qarabağ	Quzanlı	Guzanli Olympic Complex Stadium	2,000
Khazri Buzovna	Buzovna		
Kur-Nur	Mingachevir	Yashar Mammadzade Stadium	5,000
MOIK Baku	Baku		
Neftchi Baku	Baku	Tofiq Bahramov Stadium	31,200
Pambiqci Neftcala	Neftçala		
Shamkir	Şəmkir	Shamkir City Stadium	
Turan Tovuz	Tovuz	Tovuz City Stadium	6,800
Viləş	Masallı	Anatoliy Banishevskiy Stadium	7,500

== First round ==
=== League table ===
Pos	Team	Pld	W	D	L	GF	GA	GD	Pts	Qualification
1	Khazri Buzovna	20	14	5	1	31	7	+24	47	Qualification for championship group
2	Kapaz	20	13	4	3	74	20	+54	43	Qualification for championship group
3	Turan	20	13	2	5	41	24	+17	41	Qualification for championship group
4	Qarabağ	20	12	4	4	38	15	+23	40	Qualification for championship group
5	Neftçi Baku	20	11	6	3	42	17	+25	39	Qualification for championship group
6	Kur-Nur	20	7	4	9	35	41	−6	25	Qualification for championship group
7	Bakı Fahlasi	20	6	3	11	20	35	−15	21	Qualification for relegation group
8	FK Masallı	20	6	1	13	22	46	−24	19	Qualification for relegation group
9	MOIK Baku	20	5	1	14	16	43	−27	16	Qualification for relegation group
10	Şəmkir	20	3	4	13	15	39	−24	13	Qualification for relegation group
11	Pambiqci Neftcala	20	2	2	16	16	63	−47	8	Qualification for relegation group

Source: Association of Football Federations of Azerbaijan
Rules for classification: 1) points; 2) goal difference; 3) number of goals scored.

=== Results ===
Home \ Away	BFA	KAP	KHB	KNU	MAS	MOI	NEF	PNE	QAR	SHA	TUR
Bakı Fahlasi		1–0	0–2	2–3	1–2	1–0	2–4	2–1	0–2	1–1	0–2
Kapaz	4–1		2–1	7–1	1–1	7–2	0–0	10–1	0–3	8–0	3–3
Khazri Buzovna	3–1	0–0		1–1	1–0	2–0	1–0	3–0	1–0	3–0	1–1
Kur-Nur	1–1	0–5	0–3		5–0	5–3	0–4	3–1	0–2	1–1	1–2
FK Masallı	5–2	0–4	0–1	0–4		0–2	1–3	0–2	1–1	3–2	2–6
MOIK Baku	1–2	0–4	1–2	1–0	0–2		2–1	1–0	0–3	0–2	1–4
Neftçi Baku	1–1	3–2	0–0	1–0	5–0	5–1		4–1	2–2	1–0	3–1
Pambiqci Neftcala	0–1	2–10	0–1	3–5	0–2	2–0	0–0		0–7	0–0	1–4
Qarabağ	2–0	1–3	1–1	0–0	1–0	0–1	1–1	4–1		2–0	0–3
Şəmkir	1–0	0–2	0–1	0–3	1–3	1–1	1–4	3–0	1–2		0–2
Turan	0–1	0–2	0–3	4–2	2–0	1–0	1–0	3–1	0–2	2–1	

Source: APL: Yüksək dəstə – 1995/96
Legend: Blue = home team win; Yellow = draw; Red = away team win.

== Second round ==
=== Championship group ===
Pos	Team	Pld	W	D	L	GF	GA	GD	Pts	Qualification
1	Neftçi Baku (C)	20	10	6	4	32	20	+12	36	Qualification for UEFA Cup preliminary round
2	Khazri Buzovna	20	8	9	3	22	14	+8	33	Qualification for UEFA Cup preliminary round
3	Kapaz	20	9	5	6	34	21	+13	32	
4	Turan	20	9	3	8	26	30	−4	30	
5	Qarabağ	20	4	9	7	25	26	−1	21	Qualification for Cup Winners' Cup preliminary round (Note: Karabakh Agdam qualified for the qualifying round of the 1995–96 UEFA Cup Winners' Cup as runners up in the 1995–96 Azerbaijan Cup since Neftchi Baku won both the League and the Cup)
6	Kur-Nur	20	1	4	15	12	46	−34	7	

Source: Azerbaijan Professional Football league
Rules for classification: 1) points; 2) goal difference; 3) number of goals scored.
(C) Champions

=== Results ===
Home \ Away	KAP	KHB	KNU	NEF	QAR	TUR
Kapaz		0–1	2–0	2–1	0–0	0–1
Khazri Buzovna	0–0		2–1	0–0	2–2	4–1
Kur-Nur	1–0	0–1		1–3	1–1	0–1
Neftçi Baku	2–1	1–0	2–1		2–3	2–2
Qarabağ	1–2	4–0	2–2	1–2		– (Note: The match between Qarabağ and Turan was rated as 0–3 loss for both teams because of match-fixing.)
Turan	2–1	0–0	3–0 (Note: Walkover.)	1–3	1–0	

Source: APL: Yüksək dəstə – 1995/96
Legend: Blue = home team win; Yellow = draw; Red = away team win.

=== Relegation group ===
Pos	Team	Pld	W	D	L	GF	GA	GD	Pts
7	Bakı Fahlasi	16	9	2	5	26	18	+8	29
8	FK Masallı	16	9	1	6	26	29	−3	28
9	Şəmkir	16	7	4	5	31	18	+13	25
10	MOIK Baku	16	6	2	8	14	16	−2	20
11	Pambiqci Neftcala	16	4	1	11	18	34	−16	13

Source: Azerbaijan Professional Football league
Rules for classification: 1) points; 2) goal difference; 3) number of goals scored.

=== Results ===
Home \ Away	BFA	MAS	MOI	PNE	SHA
Bakı Fahlasi		3–0 (Note: Walkover.)	2–0	6–3	3–0
FK Masallı	2–1		1–0	3–1	0–0
MOIK Baku	0–0	1–0		3–0	2–0
Pambiqci Neftcala	2–0	4–1	4–1		0–1
Shamkir	0–1	9–2	2–0	8–2	

Source: APL: Yüksək dəstə – 1995/96
Legend: Blue = home team win; Yellow = draw; Red = away team win.

== Season statistics ==
=== Top scorers ===
Rank	Player	Club	Goals
1	(Azerbaijan) Fazil Parvanov	Kəpəz	23
1	(Azerbaijan) Rovshan Akhmedov	Kəpəz	23
3	(Azerbaijan) Nazim Aliyev	Neftchi Baku/Qarabağ	22
4	(Azerbaijan) Musa Kurbanov	Kur Nur Mingechaur/Turan Tovuz	15
5	(Azerbaijan) Yadigar Süleymanov	Kəpəz	14
6	(Azerbaijan) Samir A. Məmmədov	MOIK Baku/Kur Nur Mingechaur	13
6	(Azerbaijan) Mehman İbrahimov	Pambiqci Neftcala	13
6	(Azerbaijan) Ələddin Abbasov	Shamkir	13
9	(Azerbaijan) Gurban Gurbanov	Kur Nur Mingechaur/Turan Tovuz	12
10	(Azerbaijan) İlham Məmmədov	Kur Nur Mingechaur/Turan Tovuz/Neftchi Baku	11
