= Azerbaijan Football Academy =

Coordinates: 40.3783°N 49.8953°E

- Interactive map of Azerbaijan Football Academy
- Address: Nobel Avenue, Baku
- Owner: Association of Football Federations of Azerbaijan
- Type: Football Training Complex

Construction
- Built: 2008-2009
- Opened: 23 February 2009

Azerbaijan Football Academy (Azerbaijani: Azərbaycan Futbol Akademiyası) is the youth academy of the Association of Football Federations of Azerbaijan. It provides a stepping stone for youngsters to progress to the highest levels of football in Azerbaijan. The academy was officially opened on 23 February 2009 by UEFA vice president Şenes Erzik. The academy is also visited by the Spain national team's former captain Fernando Hierro.

== Structure ==
The facility includes some of the finest training facilities, and features grass pitches on three plateaus, along with an additional floodlit synthetic pitch and specialist training areas for fitness work and goalkeepers. It also includes the following:

- Gym
- Synthetic indoor training pitch
- Hydrotherapy pools
- Spa
- Sauna
- Physiotherapy rooms
- Media centre

== Staff ==
- Under 15 team coach: (Turkey) Irfan Saraoglu
