= 1998–99 Azerbaijan Top League =

Azerbaijan Top League
- Season: 1998–99
- Champions: Kapaz
- Relegated: Bakili Baku; Neftqaz Bakı; Shahdag
- Champions League: Kapaz
- UEFA Cup: Shamkir; Neftchi Baku
- Intertoto Cup: Qarabağ
- Matches played: 230
- Goals scored: 630 (2.74 per match)
- Top goalscorer: Alay Bəhramov (24)
- Biggest home win: Neftchi Baku 11-0 Şahdağ
- Biggest away win: Şahdağ 0-6 Kəpəz
- Highest scoring: Neftchi Baku 11-0 Şahdağ; Viləş FK 6-6 Turan Tovuz

The 1998–99 Azerbaijan Top League was the eighth season of the Azerbaijan Top League, since their independence from the USSR in August 1991, and was contested by 14 clubs. The season took place between 15 August 1998 and May 1999 and was won by Kapaz with Neftqaz Bakı and Shahdag being relegated to the Azerbaijan First Division as well as Bakili Baku due to financial problems.

== Teams ==
=== Stadia and locations ===
Location of teams in Azerbaijan Premier League 1998–99

| Team | Venue | Capacity |
|---|---|---|
| Bakılı Baku | Shafa Stadium (IV field) | 8,152 |
| Bakı Fahlasi | Ismat Gayibov Stadium | 5,000 |
| Dinamo Baku | Tofik Bakhramov Stadium | 29,858 |
| Kapaz | Ganja City Stadium | 26,120 |
| Qarabağ | Guzanli Olympic Stadium^{1} | 15,000 |
| Khazar Sumgayit | | |
| MOIK Baku | Shafa Stadium (IV field) | 8,152 |
| Neftchi Baku | Tofik Bakhramov Stadium | 29,858 |
| Neftqaz Bakı | Ismat Gayibov Stadium | 5,000 |
| Shafa Baku | Shafa Stadium (IV field) | 8,152 |
| Shahdag | Shovkat Ordukhanov Stadium | 4,000 |
| Shamkir | | |
| Turan Tovuz | Tovuz City Stadium | 10,000 |
| Viləş Masallı | Anatoliy Banishevskiy Stadium | 8,000 |

^{1}Qarabağ played their home matches at Surakhani Stadium in Baku before moving to their current stadium on 3 May 2009.

== First round ==
=== League table ===
| Pos | Team | Pld | W | D | L | GF | GA | GD | Pts | Qualification |
|---|---|---|---|---|---|---|---|---|---|---|
| 1 | Kapaz | 26 | 18 | 4 | 4 | 77 | 17 | +60 | 58 | Qualification for championship group |
| 2 | Qarabağ | 26 | 17 | 3 | 6 | 45 | 21 | +24 | 54 | Qualification for championship group |
| 3 | Dinamo Baku | 26 | 16 | 4 | 6 | 46 | 20 | +26 | 52 | Qualification for championship group |
| 4 | Neftchi Baku | 26 | 15 | 7 | 4 | 57 | 18 | +39 | 52 | Qualification for championship group |
| 5 | Shamkir | 26 | 16 | 2 | 8 | 42 | 24 | +18 | 50 | Qualification for championship group |
| 6 | Bakı Fahlasi | 26 | 15 | 5 | 6 | 46 | 25 | +21 | 50 | Qualification for championship group |
| 7 | Turan Tovuz | 26 | 14 | 7 | 5 | 42 | 21 | +21 | 49 | Qualification for 7-10 group |
| 8 | Viləş Masallı | 26 | 14 | 4 | 8 | 39 | 25 | +14 | 46 | Qualification for 7-10 group |
| 9 | Bakili Baku | 26 | 7 | 7 | 12 | 18 | 33 | −15 | 28 | Qualification for 7-10 group |
| 10 | MOIK Baku | 26 | 6 | 8 | 12 | 20 | 29 | −9 | 26 | Qualification for 7-10 group |
| 11 | Khazar Sumgayit | 26 | 5 | 1 | 20 | 20 | 70 | −50 | 16 | Qualification for relegation group |
| 12 | Shafa Baku | 26 | 3 | 5 | 18 | 24 | 54 | −30 | 14 | Qualification for relegation group |
| 13 | Shahdag | 26 | 2 | 4 | 20 | 20 | 86 | −66 | 10 | Qualification for relegation group |
| 14 | Neftqaz Bakı | 26 | 2 | 3 | 21 | 15 | 68 | −53 | 9 | Qualification for relegation group |

Source: Azerbaijan Professional Football league
Rules for classification: 1) points; 2) goal difference; 3) number of goals scored.

=== Results ===
| Home \ Away | BFA | BKL | DIN | KAP | KHS | MOI | NEF | NEB | QAR | SHB | ABB | SHA | TUR | MAS |
|---|---|---|---|---|---|---|---|---|---|---|---|---|---|---|
| Bakı Fahlasi | | 1–0 | 3–0 (Note: Walkover.) | 0–2 | 2–0 | 2–1 | 0–0 | 7–1 | 4–2 | 1–0 | 3–0 | 1–0 | 5–1 | 1–1 |
| Bakili | 1–1 | | 0–2 | 1–0 | 1–0 | 0–2 | 1–3 | 1–1 | 0–0 | 2–1 | 3–0 | 0–2 | 0–0 | 1–0 |
| Dinamo Baku | 1–0 | 2–1 | | 1–1 | 3–0 | 1–1 | 1–0 | 5–1 | 2–0 | 2–0 | 5–0 | 4–1 | 0–0 | 3–0 |
| Kapaz | 4–1 | 3–0 | 2–0 | | 5–0 | 3–0 | 2–0 | 7–0 | 3–0 | 6–0 | 11–1 | 1–0 | 1–1 | 2–0 |
| Khazar Sumgayit | 0–3 | 3–2 | 0–3 | 0–4 | | 0–0 | 0–4 | 3–1 | 0–3 | 1–3 | 8–3 | 3–2 | 1–2 | 0–3 |
| MOIK Baku | 2–0 | 0–0 | 0–3 | 0–0 | 2–0 | | 0–4 | 1–2 | 0–2 | 0–0 | 4–0 | 1–4 | 1–2 | 0–3 |
| Neftçi Baku | 2–2 | 0–0 | 1–0 | 1–3 | 6–0 | 3–0 | | 1–0 | 0–0 | 5–0 | 11–0 | 2–0 | 1–1 | 2–1 |
| Neftqaz Bakı | 0–4 | 0–3 | 0–2 | 1–3 | 2–0 | 1–2 | 0–2 | | 0–1 | 0–4 | 1–1 | 0–2 | 1–2 | 2–3 |
| Qarabağ | 2–2 | 2–0 | 2–1 | 2–1 | 5–0 | 3–1 | 1–0 | 4–0 | | 2–0 | 3–0 | 1–0 | 3–1 | 3–1 |
| Shafa Baku | 1–2 | 1–2 | 0–3 | 2–6 | 0–1 | 0–0 | 1–2 | 4–0 | 1–4 | | 1–2 | 0–3 | 0–2 | 2–2 |
| Şahdağ | 1–2 | 2–2 | 0–1 | 0–6 | 4–0 | 0–3 | 1–4 | 1–1 | 0–1 | 1–1 | | 0–4 | 1–2 | 1–3 |
| Şəmkir | 3–1 | 3–0 | 2–0 | 2–0 | 3–0 | 2–0 | 1–1 | 3–0 | 3–2 | 1–0 | 3–0 | | 2–2 | 1–0 |
| Turan | 0–2 | 2–0 | 2–0 | 1–1 | 6–0 | 1–0 | 0–1 | 1–0 | 3–0 | 1–1 | 8–0 | 3–0 | | 1–0 |
| Viləş FK | 1–0 | 2–0 | 2–3 | 3–0 | 1–0 | 2–1 | 2–2 | 1–0 | 1–0 | 3–0 | 3–0 | 3–0 | 1–0 | |

Source: APL: Yüksək dəstə - 1998-99
Legend: Blue = home team win; Yellow = draw; Red = away team win.

== Second round ==
=== Championship group ===
==== Table ====
| Pos | Team | Pld | W | D | L | GF | GA | GD | Pts | Qualification |
|---|---|---|---|---|---|---|---|---|---|---|
| 1 | Kapaz (C) | 10 | 8 | 1 | 1 | 17 | 7 | +10 | 25 | Qualification for Champions League first qualifying round |
| 2 | Shamkir | 10 | 5 | 1 | 4 | 10 | 10 | 0 | 16 | Qualification for UEFA Cup qualifying round |
| 3 | Neftchi Baku | 10 | 4 | 3 | 3 | 11 | 7 | +4 | 15 | Qualification for UEFA Cup qualifying round |
| 4 | Qarabağ | 10 | 3 | 3 | 4 | 5 | 8 | −3 | 12 | Qualification for Intertoto Cup first round |
| 5 | Bakı Fahlasi | 10 | 2 | 3 | 5 | 5 | 8 | −3 | 9 | |
| 6 | Dinamo Baku | 10 | 2 | 1 | 7 | 6 | 14 | −8 | 7 | |

Source: Azerbaijan Professional Football league
Rules for classification: 1) points; 2) goal difference; 3) number of goals scored.
(C) Champions

==== Results ====
| Home \ Away | BFA | DIN | KAP | NEF | QAR | SHA |
|---|---|---|---|---|---|---|
| Bakı Fahlasi | | 0–2 | 1–2 | 0–0 | 2–0 | 1–0 |
| Dinamo Baku | 1–0 | | 0–1 | 1–3 | 0–0 | 0–1 |
| Kapaz | 1–0 | 3–1 | | 1–0 | 3–0 | 3–1 |
| Neftçi Baku | 1–1 | 1–0 | 3–0 | | 0–0 | 1–0 |
| Qarabağ | 0–0 | 3–0 | 0–2 | 1–0 | | 1–0 |
| Şəmkir | 1–0 | 2–1 | 1–1 | 3–2 | 1–0 | |

Source: APL: Yüksək dəstə - 1998-99
Legend: Blue = home team win; Yellow = draw; Red = away team win.

=== 7-10 group ===
==== Table ====
| Pos | Team | Pld | W | D | L | GF | GA | GD | Pts | Relegation |
|---|---|---|---|---|---|---|---|---|---|---|
| 7 | Turan Tovuz | 6 | 4 | 2 | 0 | 17 | 6 | +11 | 14 | |
| 8 | Viləş Masallı | 6 | 2 | 3 | 1 | 16 | 12 | +4 | 9 | |
| 9 | MOIK Baku | 6 | 2 | 3 | 1 | 8 | 7 | +1 | 9 | |
| 10 | Bakili Baku (R) | 6 | 0 | 0 | 6 | 0 | 16 | −16 | 0 | Relegation to Azerbaijan First Division (Note: Bakili Baku were relegated due to financial problems) |

Source: Azerbaijan Professional Football league
Rules for classification: 1) points; 2) goal difference; 3) number of goals scored.
(R) Relegated

==== Results ====
| Home \ Away | BKL | MOI | TUR | MAS |
|---|---|---|---|---|
| Bakili | | 0–1 | 0–3 (Note: Walkover.) | 0–3 |
| MOIK Baku | 3–0 | | 0–3 | 2–2 |
| Turan | 3–0 | 0–0 | | 2–0 |
| Viləş FK | 3–0 | 2–2 | 6–6 | |

Source: APL: Yüksək dəstə - 1998-99
Legend: Blue = home team win; Yellow = draw; Red = away team win.

=== Relegation group ===
==== Table ====
| Pos | Team | Pld | W | D | L | GF | GA | GD | Pts | Relegation |
|---|---|---|---|---|---|---|---|---|---|---|
| 11 | Shafa Baku | 4 | 3 | 1 | 0 | 12 | 3 | +9 | 10 | |
| 12 | Khazar Sumgayit | 4 | 1 | 2 | 1 | 9 | 9 | 0 | 5 | |
| 13 | Neftqaz Bakı (R) | 4 | 0 | 1 | 3 | 3 | 12 | −9 | 1 | Relegation to Azerbaijan First Division |
| 14 | Shahdag (R) | 0 | 0 | 0 | 0 | 0 | 0 | 0 | 0 | Team withdrew (Note: Shahdag withdrew after the first round fixtures and as a result were relegated.) |

Source: Azerbaijan Professional Football league
Rules for classification: 1) points; 2) goal difference; 3) number of goals scored.
(R) Relegated

==== Results ====
| Home \ Away | KHS | NEB | SHB | ABB |
|---|---|---|---|---|
| Khazar Sumgayit | | 5–0 | 0–5 | |
| Neftqaz Bakı | 2–2 | | 1–3 | |
| Shafa Baku | 2–2 | 2–0 | | |
| Şahdağ | | | | |

Source: APL: Yüksək dəstə - 1998-99
Legend: Blue = home team win; Yellow = draw; Red = away team win.

== Season statistics ==
=== Top scorers ===
| Rank | Player | Club | Goals |
|---|---|---|---|
| 1 | (Azerbaijan) Alay Bəhramov | Viləş Masallı | 24 |
| 2 | (Azerbaijan) Vadim Vasilyev | Baku Fahlasi | 19 |
| 3 | (Azerbaijan) Vidadi Rzayev | Kapaz | 18 |
| 4 | (Azerbaijan) Həsən Abdullayev | Kapaz | 16 |
| 4 | (Azerbaijan) Yalçın Bağırov | Qarabağ | 16 |
| 6 | (Ukraine) Leonid Kalfa | Neftchi Baku | 15 |
| 6 | (Azerbaijan) Farrukh Ismayilov | Dinamo Baku | 15 |
| 6 | (Azerbaijan) Mushfig Huseynov | Qarabağ | 15 |
| 9 | (Azerbaijan) Badri Kvaratskhelia | Shamkir | 14 |
| 10 | (Azerbaijan) Nazim Aliyev | Dinamo Baku | 13 |
