= 1996–97 Azerbaijan Top League =

Azerbaijan Top League
- Season: 1996–97
- Champions: Neftchi Baku
- Relegated: Pambiqci Neftcala; Azerbaijan U-18
- Champions League: Neftchi Baku
- UEFA Cup: Qarabağ
- Cup Winners' Cup: Kapaz
- Matches played: 450
- Goals scored: 718 (1.6 per match)
- Top goalscorer: Gurban Gurbanov (34)

The 1996–97 Azerbaijan Top League was contested by 16 teams and won by Neftchi Baku. Champions are Garabag Agdam thanks to "youth points" from the U-15 and U-16 Championships.

== Teams ==
=== Stadia and locations ===
Location of teams in Azerbaijan Premier League 1996–97

Team	Venue	Capacity
Azerbaijan U-18		
Bakı Fahlasi	Ismat Gayibov Stadium	5,000
Fərid Baku		
Kapaz	Ganja City Stadium	26,120
Khazri Buzovna		
Khazar Sumgayit		
Kur Nur	Yashar Mammadzade Stadium	5,000
MOIK Baku	Shafa Stadium (IV field)	8,152
Neftchi Baku	Tofik Bakhramov Stadium	29,858
Pambygchi Barda	Barda City Stadium	10,000
Pambiqci Neftcala	Nariman Narimanov Stadium	2,000
Police Academy	Tofik Bakhramov Stadium	29,858
Qarabağ	Guzanli Olympic Stadium^{1}	15,000
Shamkir		
Turan Tovuz	Tovuz City Stadium	10,000
Viləş Masallı	Anatoliy Banishevskiy Stadium	8,000

^{1}Qarabağ played their home matches at Surakhani Stadium in Baku before moving to their current stadium on 3 May 2009.

== League table ==
Pos	Team	Pld	W	D	L	GF	GA	GD	Pts	Qualification or relegation
1	Neftçi Baku (C)	30	23	5	2	98	20	+78	74	Qualification for Champions League first qualifying round
2	Qarabağ	30	23	2	5	61	25	+36	71	Qualification for UEFA Cup first qualifying round
3	Khazri Buzovna	30	20	6	4	59	23	+36	66	
4	Turan	30	19	7	4	48	13	+35	64	
5	Kapaz	30	18	4	8	59	26	+33	58	Qualification for Cup Winners' Cup qualifying round (Note: Kapaz qualified for the qualifying round of the 1995–96 UEFA Cup Winners' Cup as winners of the 1996–97 Azerbaijan Cup.)
6	Khazar Sumgayit	30	18	4	8	58	30	+28	58	
7	Fərid Baku	30	13	8	9	45	31	+14	47	
8	Pambygchi Barda	30	11	5	14	41	47	−6	38	
9	MOIK Baku	30	7	6	17	26	50	−24	27	
10	Şəmkir	30	8	2	20	30	106	−76	26	
11	Bakı Fahlasi	30	10	7	13	37	41	−4	37	
12	FK Masallı	30	9	6	15	38	52	−14	33	
13	Kur-Nur	30	7	4	19	30	59	−29	25	
14	Police Academy	30	5	7	18	23	49	−26	22	
15	Pambiqci Neftcala (R)	30	5	6	19	27	68	−41	21	Relegation to Azerbaijan First Division
16	Azerbaijan U-18	30	4	1	25	38	78	−40	13	Relegation to Azerbaijan First Division

Source: Association of Football Federations of Azerbaijan
Rules for classification: 1) points; 2) goal difference; 3) number of goals scored.
(C) Champions; (R) Relegated

== Results ==
Home \ Away	U18	BFA	FAR	KAP	KHS	KHB	KNU	MAS	MOI	NEF	PNE	PBÄ	PAC	QAR	SHA	TUR
Azerbaijan U-18		1–2	0–2	1–2	0–4	1–4	2–3	4–2	0–1	1–7	5–3	0–2	2–3	1–4	5–1	0–3
Bakı Fahlasi	3–2		1–2	0–3	2–1	0–1	4–1	0–0	1–1	0–1	7–1	3–0 (Note: Walkover.)	1–0	1–2	3–0	0–0
Fərid Baku	2–1	1–1		2–0	0–2	1–0	0–0	1–1	3–0	0–3	2–0	2–2	2–0	1–2	9–0	1–0
Kapaz	2–1	3–0	3–0		1–1	1–2	2–0	2–0	1–0	1–1	2–0	5–1	3–0	3–1	14–2	1–0
Khazar Sumgayit	0–2	3–0	2–2	4–2		0–0	3–1	3–1	2–0	0–1	3–1	4–1	1–0	1–0	7–0	1–3
Khazri Buzovna	3–2	1–0	3–2	1–0	3–1		1–0	2–1	4–0	1–1	3–0	8–0	2–0	1–0	2–1	3–1
Kur-Nur	2–0	1–1	1–2	1–0	0–2	1–5		1–1	0–1	1–3	2–0	3–2	2–0	1–2	0–3	1–1
FK Masallı	2–1	1–3	0–0	0–1	1–2	3–0	2–0		2–0	2–4	5–0	2–0	1–1	0–2	6–1	0–0
MOIK Baku	1–0	0–1	0–4	0–1	1–2	1–1	4–1	0–1		0–0	1–0	1–1	1–1	0–3	9–0	0–1
Neftçi Baku	7–1	6–1	0–0	2–0	3–1	4–1	4–0	7–1	9–0		7–2	2–0	5–0	0–0	4–1	2–0
Pambiqci Neftcala	1–1	1–1	1–0	1–1	0–2	0–0	2–1	3–1	0–2	2–3		0–1	1–0	2–4	2–4	0–2
Pambygchi Bärdä	2–1	3–0	3–0	1–2	2–0	0–0	3–2	4–0	6–1	0–4	0–0		1–0	0–1	1–2	0–2
Police Academy	4–2	0–0	1–1	0–3	1–3	0–1	2–1	0–1	1–0	1–2	0–0	0–0		1–1	0–2	1–3
Qarabağ	2–1	2–1	2–1	1–0	1–0	2–1	3–1	2–1	3–1	2–1	4–1	1–0	6–1		3–0	1–2
Şəmkir	2–1	2–0	0–1	3–0	1–3	0–5	0–1	3–0	0–0	0–5	1–3	0–5	0–5	1–4		0–0
Turan	2–0	1–0	2–1	0–0	0–0	0–0	4–1	5–0	1–0	1–0	3–0	1–0	1–0	1–0	8–0	

Source: APL: Yüksək dəstə - 1996/97
Legend: Blue = home team win; Yellow = draw; Red = away team win.

== Season statistics ==
=== Top scorers ===
Rank	Player	Club	Goals
1	(Azerbaijan) Qurban Qurbanov	Neftchi	34
2	(Azerbaijan) Samir Alakbarov	Neftchi	25
3	(Azerbaijan) Rövşən Əhmədov	Kəpəz	18
4	(Azerbaijan) Nazim Aliyev	Qarabağ	17
5	(Azerbaijan) Mushfig Huseynov	Qarabağ	15
6	(Azerbaijan) Həsən Abdullayev	Şəmkir / Pambygchi Neftchala	14
7	(Azerbaijan) Pasha Aliyev	Khazri Buzovna	13
8	(Azerbaijan) Musa Qurbanov	Kur-Nur / Neftchi	12
8	(Azerbaijan) Azər İsayev	Khazri Buzovna	12
8	(Azerbaijan) Ismayil Mammadov	Khazar Sumgayit	12
