= Qarabağ Khankendi =

- Full name: Qarabağ Xankəndi Futbol Klubu
- Founded: 1927; 99 years ago
- Ground: Surakhani Stadium; Baku, Azerbaijan
- Capacity: 15,000
- League: AFFA Amateur League

Qarabağ Khankendi Football Club (Azerbaijani: Qarabağ Xankəndi FK) was an Azerbaijani football club from Khankendi, that played in Baku and for the 2007/08 season played in the AFFA Amateur League (a minor league in the Azerbaijani football league system). Nadir Gasimov was the coach for the 2007/08 season.

== History ==
The club was founded in 1927 in the city of Khankendi in Nagorno-Karabakh. In 1977 they also won the Azerbaijan USSR League. Similar to Qarabağ Aghdam, Qarabağ Khankendi was also forced to leave their hometown amidst the First Nagorno-Karabakh war and play in Baku, the capital of Azerbaijan.

== Achievements ==
- Azerbaijan USSR League
  - Champions (1): 1977
