= 2026–27 AFFA Qadınlar Super Liqası =

AFFA Qadınlar Super Liqası
- Season: 2026-27
- Dates: 17 October 2026 - 24 January 2027 (Regular season)
- Matches: 30
- Goals: 224 (7.47 per match)

The 2026–27 AFFA Qadınlar Super Liqası or, for sponsorship reasons, Liv Bona Dea Qadınlar Super Liqası, is the 19th season of the top-tier women's football league in Azerbaijan.

The fixture draw for the league was held on 21 September 2026.

According to an agreement made on 17 October 2026 between the Association of Football Federations of Azerbaijan (AFFA) and Liv Bona Dea Hospital, Liv Bona Dea Hospital became the title sponsor of the Women's Super League.

== Regular season ==
The regular season is played in a single round-robin format, with all teams playing each other only once during this stage. At the end of this stage, the points earned by the teams do not carry over to the second stage and are reset.

=== League table ===
Pos	Team	Pld	W	D	L	GF	GA	GD	Pts	Qualification
1	Neftçi PFK	5	5	0	0	31	0	+31	15	League Stage - Group A
2	İmişli PFK	5	4	0	1	27	4	+23	12	League Stage - Group A
3	Sabah FK	5	3	2	0	39	1	+38	11	League Stage - Group A
4	Şəfa FK	5	3	1	1	31	5	+26	10	League Stage - Group A
5	Liman UFK	5	3	1	1	21	4	+17	10	League Stage - Group A
6	Araz-Naxçıvan PFK	5	3	0	2	39	18	+21	9	League Stage - Group A
7	Sumqayıt FK	5	2	0	3	16	20	−4	6	League Stage - Group B
8	Dirçəliş FK	5	1	1	3	5	23	−18	4	League Stage - Group B
9	Ümid Gəncə	5	1	0	4	11	28	−17	3	League Stage - Group B
10	Qəbələ İK	5	0	3	2	1	19	−18	3	League Stage - Group B
11	Baku Juniors	5	0	1	4	2	33	−31	1	League Stage - Group B
12	Goranboy OİK	5	0	1	4	1	69	−68	1	League Stage - Group B

Updated to match(es) played on 15 November 2026. Source: Azerbaijan Football Federation - League table

=== Results ===
Week 1 - Match Results
Date	Match	Result
17 October 2026	Dirçəliş FK – Sumqayıt FK	3–7
17 October 2026	İmişli PFK – Neftçi PFK	0–4
17 October 2026	Ümid (Gəncə) – Baku Juniors	11–0
17 October 2026	Liman UFK – Sabah FK	1–1
17 October 2026	Şəfa FK – Qəbələ İK	10–0
18 October 2026	Araz-Naxçıvan PFK – Goranboy OİK	23–0
Week 2 - Match Results
Date	Match	Result
24 October 2026	Goranboy OİK – Liman UFK	0–9
24 October 2026	Baku Juniors – Araz-Naxçıvan PFK	1–13
25 October 2026	Sabah FK – Şəfa FK	0–0
25 October 2026	Qəbələ İK – Dirçəliş FK	1–1
25 October 2026	Neftçi PFK – Ümid (Gəncə)	9–0
3 November 2026	Sumqayıt FK – İmişli PFK	0–8
Week 3 - Match Results
Date	Match	Result
31 October 2026	Liman UFK – Baku Juniors	5–0
31 October 2026	Şəfa FK – Goranboy OİK	17–1
31 October 2026	Qəbələ İK – Sabah FK	0–8
1 November 2026	Araz-Naxçıvan PFK – Neftçi PFK	0–12
1 November 2026	Ümid (Gəncə) – Sumqayıt FK	0–7
1 November 2026	Dirçəliş FK – İmişli PFK	0–5
Week 4 - Match Results
Date	Match	Result
7 November 2026	Neftçi PFK – Liman UFK	3–0
7 November 2026	Sumqayıt FK – Araz-Naxçıvan PFK	2–3
7 November 2026	Goranboy OİK – Qəbələ İK	0–0
8 November 2026	Baku Juniors – Şəfa FK	1–4
8 November 2026	Sabah FK – Dirçəliş FK	10–0
8 November 2026	İmişli PFK – Ümid (Gəncə)	11–0
Week 5 - Match Results
Date	Match	Result
14 November 2026	Dirçəliş FK – Ümid (Gəncə)	1–0
14 November 2026	Liman UFK – Sumqayıt FK	6–0
14 November 2026	Qəbələ İK – Baku Juniors	0-0
15 November 2026	Araz-Naxçıvan PFK – İmişli PFK	0–3
15 November 2026	Sabah FK – Goranboy OİK	20–0
15 November 2026	Şəfa FK – Neftçi PFK	0–3
Week 6 - Match Results
Date	Match	Result
10–13 December 2026	Ümid (Gəncə) – Araz-Naxçıvan PFK	
10–13 December 2026	Baku Juniors – Sabah FK	
10–13 December 2026	Neftçi PFK – Qəbələ İK	
10–13 December 2026	Sumqayıt FK – Şəfa FK	
10–13 December 2026	İmişli PFK – Liman UFK	
10–13 December 2026	Goranboy OİK – Dirçəliş FK	
Week 7 - Match Results
Date	Match	Result
17–20 December 2026	Goranboy OİK – Baku Juniors	
17–20 December 2026	Liman UFK – Ümid (Gəncə)	
17–20 December 2026	Şəfa FK – İmişli PFK	
17–20 December 2026	Qəbələ İK – Sumqayıt FK	
17–20 December 2026	Sabah FK – Neftçi PFK	
17–20 December 2026	Dirçəliş FK – Araz-Naxçıvan PFK	
Week 8 - Match Results
Date	Match	Result
24–27 December 2026	Ümid (Gəncə) – Şəfa FK	
24–27 December 2026	Neftçi PFK – Goranboy OİK	
24–27 December 2026	Sumqayıt FK – Sabah FK	
24–27 December 2026	İmişli PFK – Qəbələ İK	
24–27 December 2026	Baku Juniors – Dirçəliş FK	
24–27 December 2026	Araz-Naxçıvan PFK – Liman UFK	
Week 9 - Match Results
Date	Match	Result
8–10 January 2027	Sabah FK – İmişli PFK	
8–10 January 2027	Şəfa FK – Araz-Naxçıvan PFK	
8–10 January 2027	Qəbələ İK – Ümid (Gəncə)	
8–10 January 2027	Dirçəliş FK – Liman UFK	
8–10 January 2027	Goranboy OİK – Sumqayıt FK	
8–10 January 2027	Baku Juniors – Neftçi PFK	
Week 10 - Match Results
Date	Match	Result
14–17 January 2027	İmişli PFK – Goranboy OİK	
14–17 January 2027	Sumqayıt FK – Baku Juniors	
14–17 January 2027	Neftçi PFK – Dirçəliş FK	
14–17 January 2027	Ümid (Gəncə) – Sabah FK	
14–17 January 2027	Araz-Naxçıvan PFK – Qəbələ İK	
14–17 January 2027	Liman UFK – Şəfa FK	
Week 11 - Match Results
Date	Match	Result
21–24 January 2027	Qəbələ İK – Liman UFK	
21–24 January 2027	Dirçəliş FK – Şəfa FK	
21–24 January 2027	Sabah FK – Araz-Naxçıvan PFK	
21–24 January 2027	Goranboy OİK – Ümid (Gəncə)	
21–24 January 2027	Baku Juniors – İmişli PFK	
21–24 January 2027	Neftçi PFK – Sumqayıt FK	

== League Stage ==
In the league stage, the top 6 teams based on the regular season results will compete in Group A, while the teams finishing 7th to 12th will compete in Group B. Matches in both groups will be played in a double round-robin (home and away)

=== League Table - Group A ===
Pos	Team	Pld	W	D	L	GF	GA	GD	Pts	Qualification
1	A1 (C)	0	0	0	0	0	0	0	0	2027–28 UEFA Women's Champions League first round
2	A2	0	0	0	0	0	0	0	0	
3	A3	0	0	0	0	0	0	0	0	
4	A4	0	0	0	0	0	0	0	0	
5	A5	0	0	0	0	0	0	0	0	
6	A6	0	0	0	0	0	0	0	0	

Updated to match(es) played on unknown. Source:
(C) Champions

=== Results ===
Week 1 - Match Results
Date	Match	Result
	A1 - A2	
	A3 - A4	
	A5 - A6	
Week 2 - Match Results
Date	Match	Result
	A1 - A2	
	A3 - A4	
	A5 - A6	
Week 3 - Match Results
Date	Match	Result
	A1 - A2	
	A3 - A4	
	A5 - A6	
Week 4 - Match Results
Date	Match	Result
	A1 - A2	
	A3 - A4	
	A5 - A6	
Week 5 - Match Results
Date	Match	Result
	A1 - A2	
	A3 - A4	
	A5 - A6	
Week 6 - Match Results
Date	Match	Result
	A1 - A2	
	A3 - A4	
	A5 - A6	
Week 7 - Match Results
Date	Match	Result
	A1 - A2	
	A3 - A4	
	A5 - A6	
Week 8 - Match Results
Date	Match	Result
	A1 - A2	
	A3 - A4	
	A5 - A6	
Week 9 - Match Results
Date	Match	Result
	A1 - A2	
	A3 - A4	
	A5 - A6	
Week 10 - Match Results
Date	Match	Result
	A1 - A2	
	A3 - A4	
	A5 - A6	

=== League Table - Group B ===
Pos	Team	Pld	W	D	L	GF	GA	GD	Pts
1	B1	0	0	0	0	0	0	0	0
2	B2	0	0	0	0	0	0	0	0
3	B3	0	0	0	0	0	0	0	0
4	B4	0	0	0	0	0	0	0	0
5	B5	0	0	0	0	0	0	0	0
6	B6	0	0	0	0	0	0	0	0

Updated to match(es) played on unknown. Source:

=== Results ===
Week 1 - Match Results
Date	Match	Result
	B1 - B2	
	B3 - B4	
	B5 - B6	
Week 2 - Match Results
Date	Match	Result
	B1 - B2	
	B3 - B4	
	B5 - B6	
Week 3 - Match Results
Date	Match	Result
	B1 - B2	
	B3 - B4	
	B5 - B6	
Week 4 - Match Results
Date	Match	Result
	B1 - B2	
	B3 - B4	
	B5 - B6	
Week 5 - Match Results
Date	Match	Result
	B1 - B2	
	B3 - B4	
	B5 - B6	
Week 6 - Match Results
Date	Match	Result
	B1 - B2	
	B3 - B4	
	B5 - B6	
Week 7 - Match Results
Date	Match	Result
	B1 - B2	
	B3 - B4	
	B5 - B6	
Week 8 - Match Results
Date	Match	Result
	B1 - B2	
	B3 - B4	
	B5 - B6	
Week 9 - Match Results
Date	Match	Result
	B1 - B2	
	B3 - B4	
	B5 - B6	
Week 10 - Match Results
Date	Match	Result
	B1 - B2	
	B3 - B4	
	B5 - B6	
