= FK Neftqaz Bakı =

Neftqaz Bakı
- Full name: Neftqaz Bakı Futbol Klubu
- Dissolved: 1999; 26 years ago
- Ground: Ismat Gayibov Stadium; Baku
- League: Azerbaijan Top Division
- 1998–99: 13th

Neftqaz Bakı FK (Azerbaijani: Neftqaz Bakı Futbol Klubu) was an Azerbaijani football club from Baku founded in the 1990s as Dalgix Baku.

They participated in the Azerbaijan Top Division during the 1998–99 season as Neftqaz Baku before being relegated at the end of the season after finishing 13th.

== League and domestic cup history ==
Season	League									Azerbaijan Cup	Top goalscorer	
Season	Div.	Pos.	Pl.	W	D	L	GS	GA	P	Azerbaijan Cup	Name	League
1998–99	1st	13	30	2	4	24	18	80	10	Last 16	Həbib Ağayev	6
