= FK Fərid Baku =

Fərid Baku
- Full name: Futbol Klubu Fərid Baku
- Founded: 1995; 31 years ago
- Dissolved: 1997; 29 years ago
- Ground: Baku
- League: Azerbaijan Top Division
- 1996–97: 7th

FK Fərid Baku (Azerbaijani: Futbol Klubu Fərid Baku) was an Azerbaijani football club from Baku founded in 1995, and dissolved in 1997.

They came third in the Azerbaijan First Division during their first season as a club, gaining promotion to the Azerbaijan Top Division. In their one and only season in the First Division, they finished 7th in the league and reached the semi-finals of the Azerbaijan Cup, getting beaten by Khazri Buzovna.

== League and domestic cup history ==
| Season | League | | | | | | | | | Azerbaijan Cup | Top goalscorer | |
| Season | Div. | Pos. | Pl. | W | D | L | GS | GA | P | Azerbaijan Cup | Name | League |
|---|---|---|---|---|---|---|---|---|---|---|---|---|
| 1995–96 | 2nd | 3 | 28 | 21 | 3 | 4 | 35 | 13 | 66 | Last 16 | | |
| 1996–97 | 1st | 7 | 30 | 13 | 8 | 9 | 45 | 31 | 47 | Semi-Final | Bəxtiyar Hüseynov | 11 |
