= List of football clubs in Azerbaijan =

This is a list of football clubs in Azerbaijan from 2025–26 season.

== Azerbaijan Premier League ==
The top tier league will be contested with 12 teams.

Name	Founded	President	Manager	Stadium
Araz	1967	Ramin Akhundov	Elmar Bakhshiyev	Nakhchivan City Stadium
İmişli	2022	Kamran Eyyubov	Farid Namazov	Heydar Aliyev Stadium
Kapaz	1959	Adil Valiyev	Vacant	Ganja City Stadium
Karvan	2004	Bakhtiyar Hüseynov	Kamran Agayev	Yevlakh City Stadium
Neftçi	1937	Cenk Sümer	Samir Abasov	Bakcell Arena
Qəbələ	2005	Fariz Najafov	Kakhaber Tskhadadze	Gabala City Stadium
Qarabağ	1987	Tahir Gözel	Gurban Gurbanov	Azersun Arena
Sabah	2017	Magsud Adigozalov	Vacant	Bank Respublika Arena
Shamakhi	1997	Elchin Usub	Aykhan Abbasov	Shamakhi City Stadium
Sumqayıt	2010	Riad Rafiyev	Vacant	Sumgayit City Stadium
Turan	1992	Ehtiram Quliyev	Kurban Berdyev	Tovuz City Stadium
Zira	2014	Taleh Nasibov	Rashad Sadygov	Zira Olympic Sport Complex Stadium

== Azerbaijan First Division ==
The second tier league will be contested with 10 teams.

Name	Founded	President	Manager	Stadium
Baku Sporting	2018	Yasin Jalilov	Elman Sultanov	Baku Sporting Arena
Difai	2022	Asaf Malikov	Pasha Aliyev	Shamakhi City Stadium
Jabrayil FK	2021	Shahin Mammadov	Ali Muradov	ASCO Arena
Mingəçevir	2022	Nurlan Ahmadov	Fizuli Mammadov	Yashar Mammadzade Stadium
MOIK Baku	1961	Mansur Najafov	Orkhan Safiyaroghlu	ASCO Arena
Sabail	2016	Firuz Qarayev	Elvin Mammadov	ASCO Arena
Shahdag Qusar	1950	Elçin Cananov	Elnur Abdullayev	ASCO Arena
Shafa	1998	Sardar Salmanzade	Nadir Aliyev	ASK Arena
Şimal	2022	Mahammad Balaqadaşov	Racab Mahmudov	Siyazan City Stadium
Zaqatala	2015	Şaban Şirdanov	Rustam Mamadov	Zaqatala City Stadium

== Azerbaijan Second League ==
The third tier league will be contested with 12 teams.

- Ağdaş FK
- Araz Saatlı
- Dinamo Baku
- Göygöl FK
- Hypers FC
- Kür-Araz
- Qaradağ Lökbatan
- Qusar FK
- Sheki City FK
- Şəmkir PFK
- Şirvan FK
- Xankəndi FK

== Azerbaijan Regional League ==
=== Group A ===
- ŞKGB
- Şirvanovka
- Gənclər
- Lokomotiv Baku
- Ramana FK
- ATİDEL PFK
- Record Club
- İnşaatçı PİK

=== Group B ===
- Cəngi FK
- City Baku FK
- Xanlıq
- Əmirli FK
- Çinar Zəngilan FK
- Dirçəliş FK

=== Group C ===
- Mübariz FA
- Xudat City FA
- Bayıl Rovers
- Qaradağ Şıxlar FK
- İCBFA
- Gənclik İK

=== Group D ===
- Ümid FK
- Marafon İK
- Bahar
- Avşar FK
- Hacıqabul
- Şirvan OİK

=== Group E ===
- Araz
- Sabirabad FK
- Xankəndi FK
- Lokomotiv İmişli
- Şirvan FK
- Mil FK

=== Group F ===
- Zəfər-44
- Biləsuvar FK
- Ərkivan
- Salyan OİK
- Qobustan FK
- Masallı PFK
- Lənkəran FK
- Neftçala FK

=== Group G ===
- Balakən FK
- Tərtər FK
- Bərdə FK
- Kürmük
- Ağstafa Gəncləri
- Xocalı PFK

=== Group H ===
- Goranboy OİK
- Naftalan FK
- Qax FK
- VT Gəncə

== AFFA Amateur League ==
- FC Absheron
- FK Masallı
- FK Ganclarbirliyi Sumqayit
- Djidir Shusha
- Spartak Baku
- FC Qarabag Khankendi
- Nidzhat Mashtagi
- Narzan Gadabay
- Femida Bilasuvar
- Kainat Sumqayit
- Kavkaz Belokan
- Mil Beylagan
- Ayulduz Baku
- Bayil Rovers
- Neftchi ISM
- Denizchi XDND
- Adliyya Baku
- Spartak Guba
- Bailov Rovers
