= 2002–03 Azerbaijan Top League =

Azerbaijan Top League
- Season: 2002–03
- Champions: -

The 2002–03 Azerbaijan Top League The championship was not held due to the conflict between clubs and AFFA at the end of last season. In this regard, Azerbaijani clubs have not been released in the second year of European club tournaments.
