= Baku Juniors =

Baku Juniors Women
- Full name: Baku Juniors Women Football Club
- Nickname: Kukilər (The Cookies)
- Founded: 2021; 5 years ago (As Xırdalan City)
- Manager: Aghasaf Osmanli
- League: AFFA Top Girls League
- 2023–24: 3rd
- Website: https://www.bakujuniors.com/

Baku Juniors Women, whose first team is branded as Baku Juniors, is an Azerbaijani women's association football club based in Baku, Azerbaijan.

== History ==
The team was established in 2022 as Xırdalan City. In November 2023, the club changed its name to Baku Juniors. In season 2023-24, they finished 3rd in the AFFA Top Girls League.
