= Tahir Gözel =

Azerbaijani businessman

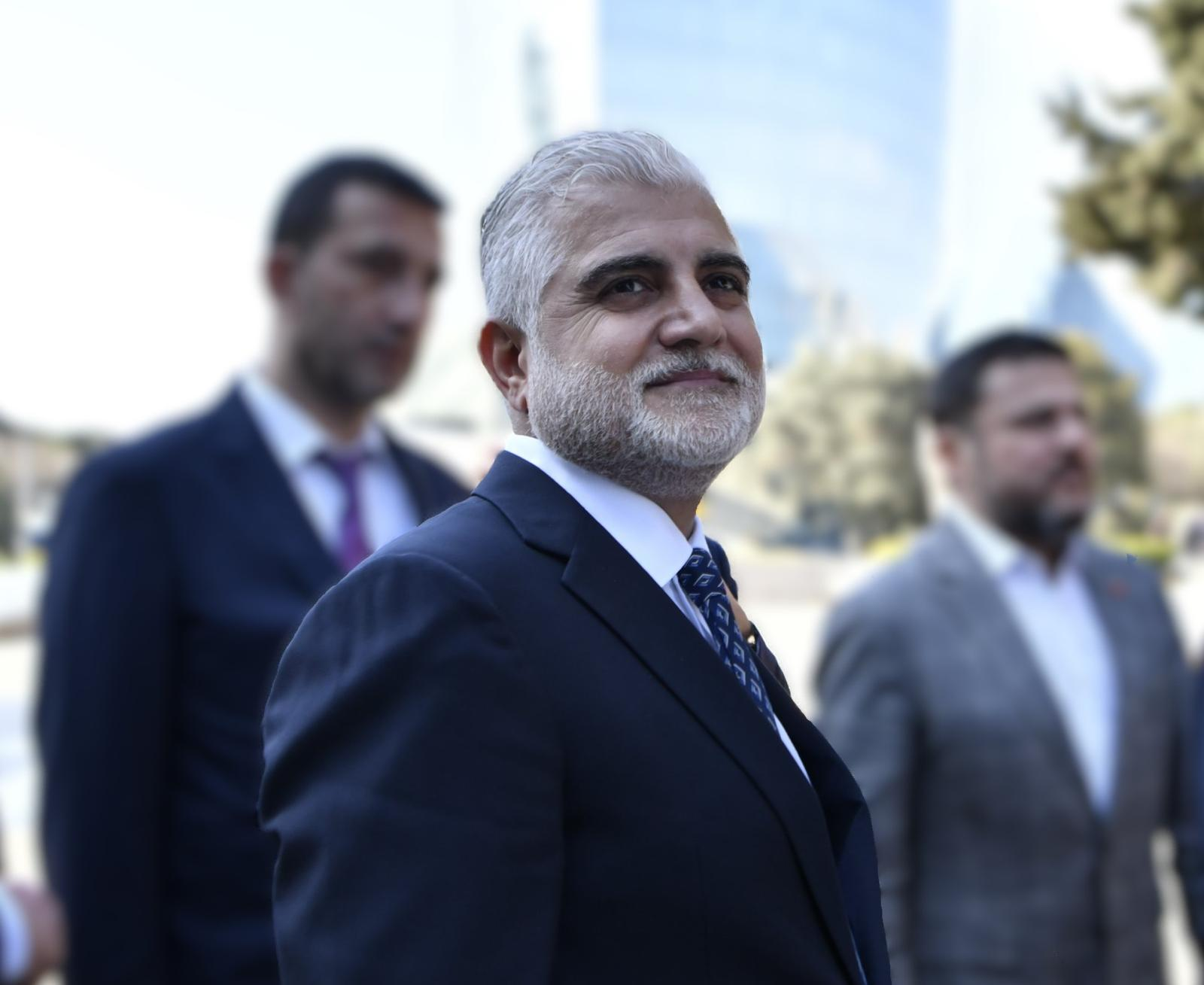

President of Qarabağ FK
- Incumbent
- Assumed office 14 September 2015

Personal details
- Born: August 23, 1972 (age 54)
- Education: Sheffield University
- Profession: Businessperson

Tahir Gözel (born 23 August 1972) is an Azerbaijani businessman known for work both in the corporate and in sports worlds. He is the president of Qarabağ Football Club. Gözel is also the founder of the Tahir Gözel Initiative for Development (TGID), an organization focused on sustainable development and socio-economic advancement.

== Early years ==
Born into a family with a business background in 1972, Gözel moved to Turkey in 1981 and graduated from the Management faculty of Sheffield University in 1994 and Sup De Co University in France in 1995. He started his career at the Sun Tea company in Dubai in 1995 as General Coordinator and worked in this position until 2000. He was then promoted to the position of vice president in Sun Tea.

== Career with Qarabağ Football Club ==
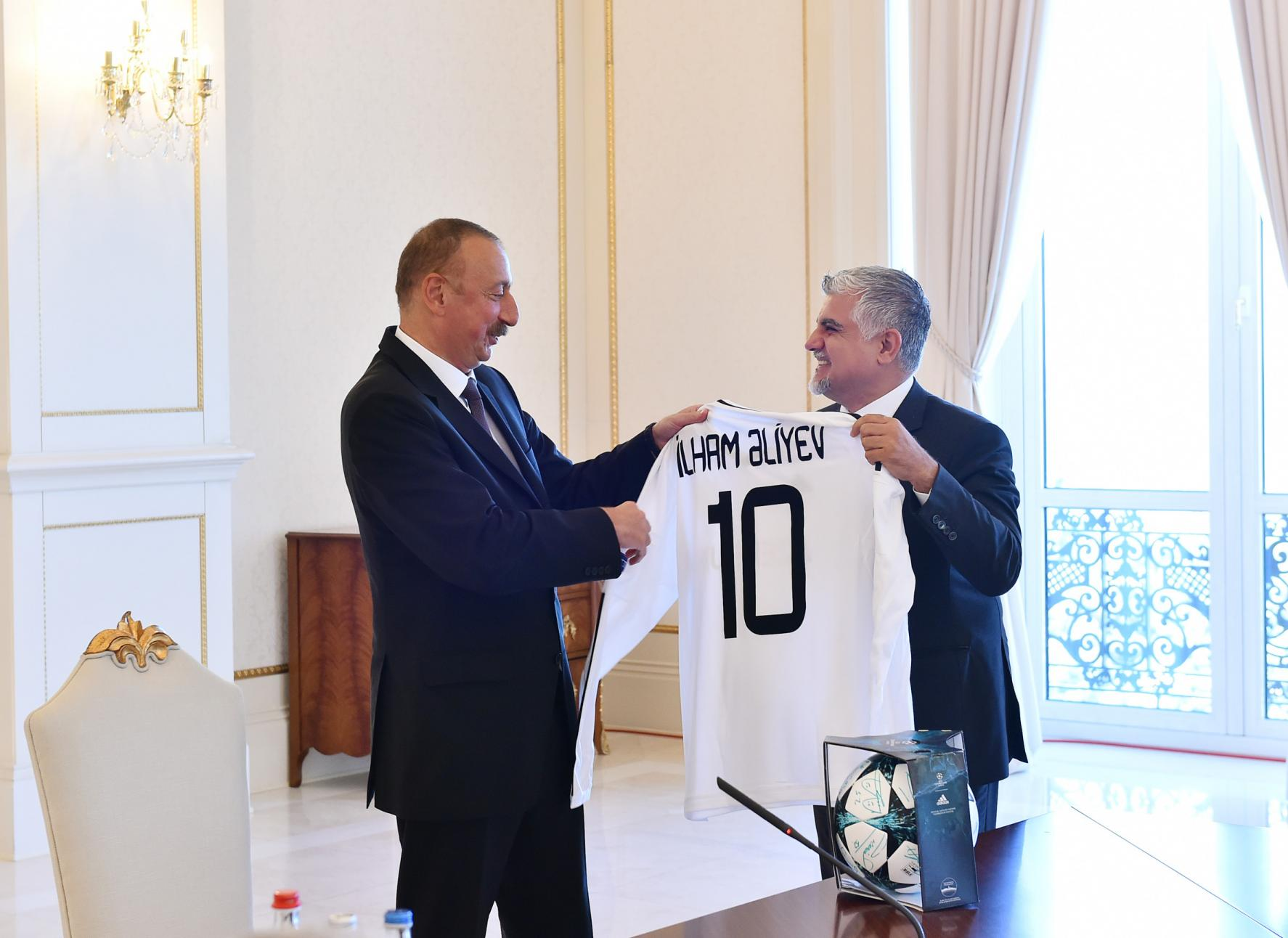
Tahir Gozal presents Qarabağ FK football uniform to the President of Azerbaijan, Ilham Aliyev.

Under Gözel's leadership which started as vice-president in 2004 and continued as president of the club in 2015, Qarabağ FC won ten - 2023/2024, 2022/2023, 2021/2022, 2019/2020, 2018/2019, 2017/2018, 2016/2017, 2015/2016, 2014/2015 and 2013/2014 Azerbaijan Premier League titles and seven - 2023/2024, 2021/2022, 2016/2017, 2015/2016, 2014/2015, 2008/2009 and 2005/2006 Azerbaijan Cups.

The club reached a significant milestone in 2017 by becoming the first Azerbaijani team to qualify for the UEFA Champions League group stage. Qarabağ FK has reached the group stage of the UEFA Europa League eight times since the 2014-15 season, which is the record for Azerbaijani clubs.

== Business ventures and sustainable agriculture ==
Beyond football, Gözel is involved in business and philanthropy. He founded the Tahir Gözel Initiative for Development (TGID), which focused on sustainable development in vulnerable regions, including Middle Corridor countries, as well as climate change vulnerable countries. TGID works with NGOs, think tanks, and international development organizations to formulate cross-boundary policies and initiatives that aim to reverse climate change globally.

Gözel also owns Greentech. Established in 2011, GreenTech specializes in the cultivation of vegetables and seedlings within modern greenhouse conditions. Company is one of the largest tomato production facilities in Azerbaijan, managing 70 hectares of cultivated land. Over the years, GreenTech has expanded its operations through subsidiary companies.

One of the Gözel's enterprises, Agrovita focuses on the distribution and trade of agricultural products in Azerbaijan and Uzbekistan. "Agrovita" LLC has been operating since 2015 to support the development strategy of agriculture in Azerbaijan. The company engaged in the sale of seeds, fertilizers, biological control products, pesticides, and greenhouse supplies.

Gözel established Gozal Tabiat LLC Gözel introduced the Azerbaijan Seed Company, the country's first commercial vegetable seed breeding company, operating breeding stations in Spain, Turkey, Uzbekistan, and Azerbaijan.

Tahir Gözel is the founder of Proxima Tech Solutions, a company known for providing telecommunications and IT infrastructure services. Proxima Tech Solutions is focusing on digital transformation and supporting the technological infrastructure.

Tahir Gözel is also the founder of the Tusi-Bohm Planetarium in Park Bulvar, Baku, where he introduced the first new-generation 4K planetarium in the Caucasus.

== Middle Corridor ==
Tahir Gözel supports the Middle Corridor, a key trade route connecting Europe and Asia via Central Asia and the Caucasus. TGID initiated “Path to Net Zero for the Middle Corridor” act.

== Philosophical interests ==
Gözel's philosophical influences include figures like Jiddu Krishnamurti, David Bohm, and the Azerbaijani philosopher and poet Imadaddin Nasimi. Additionally, he is influenced by Pierre Teilhard de Chardin’s concept of the noosphere, which emphasizes the evolution of human consciousness towards unity. Gözel is a thinker and a philosopher interested in the fields of the philosophy of mind and science, as well as in the philosophy of nature of Chardin and Thomas Berry and the movement toward ecological consciousness.
