= Suparibağ =

- Municipality
- Location within Azerbaijan
- Coordinates: 38°28′05″N 48°52′00″E
- Country: Azerbaijan
- Rayon: Astara

Population
  - Total: 1,052
- Time zone: UTC+4 (AZT)

Suparibağ (also, Suparibag) is a village and municipality in the Astara Rayon of Azerbaijan. It has a population of 1,052.
