= Topaz (bookmaker) =

Bookmaker in Azerbaijan

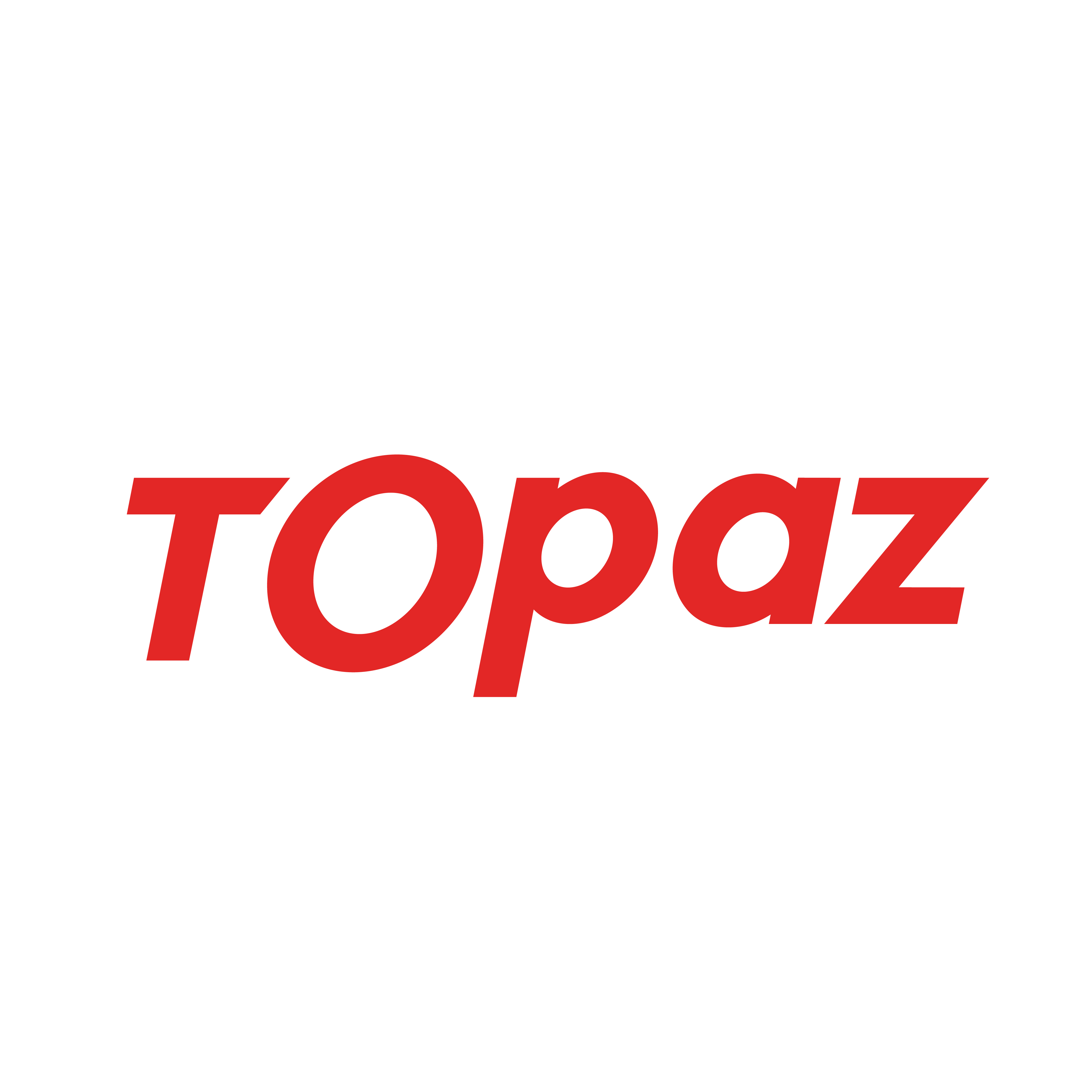
- Company type: Public
- Industry: Gambling
- Founded: 8 January 2011
- Headquarters: Baku, Azerbaijan
- Products: Bookmaking, betting shops
- Number of employees: 100 (2019)
- Website: topaz.az

Topaz is a bookmaker in Azerbaijan, a commercial trademark of Caspiantech, was launched in 2011 as a single legal sports-betting game operator in Azerbaijan.

Caspiantech CJSC was founded on January 19, 2010, with the goal of evaluating the investment potential of Azerbaijan in the sports-betting sector.

In 2013, it launched its greyhound racing game, in addition to commencing the selling of Azerlotereya's lottery products. Topaz was the main sponsor of the Azerbaijan Premier League from 2012-2019.

== Sponsorship ==
In 2012, Topaz became the official betting partner of Azerbaijan Premier League and received the rights to operate betting for all England and Football Association matches. Topaz was the main sponsor of the Azerbaijan Premier League (Topaz Premiere League) from 2012-2019.

== Criticism ==
In March 2013, the company faced heavy pressure from the National Assembly of Azerbaijan due to its negative effect on youth, but the company was supported by Azad Rahimov, the Minister of Youth and Sports of Azerbaijan Republic. Rahimov claimed, all Topaz' operations are fully transparent, and the company is supporting the sport industry.
