= Association of Football Federations of Azerbaijan =

Governing body of football in Azerbaijan

UEFA
- Founded: 26 March 1992; 34 years ago
- Headquarters: Khatai, Baku
- FIFA affiliation: 1994; 32 years ago
- UEFA affiliation: 1994; 32 years ago
- President: Rovshan Najaf
- Vice-President: 3 officials
- Website: www.affa.az

The Association of Football Federations of Azerbaijan (AFFA; Azerbaijani: Azərbaycan Futbol Federasiyaları Assosiasiyası, AFFA) is the governing body of football in Azerbaijan. Formed in 1992, it is responsible for overseeing all aspects of the amateur and professional game in its territory. AFFA is a member of both UEFA and FIFA.

AFFA sanctions all competitive football matches within its remit at national level, and indirectly at local level through the AFFA Amateur League. It runs numerous competitions, the most famous of which is the Azerbaijan Cup. It is also responsible for appointing the management of the men's, women's and youth national football teams and leagues.

== History ==
The AFFA was formed on 26 March 1992, after Azerbaijan gained independence from the USSR. On 23 February 2009, the AFFA, along with UEFA vice president Şenes Erzik, unveiled the Azerbaijan Football Academy at Nobel Avenue, Baku.

In 2010, the association adopted a new logo. In 2012, the federation held an election with Rovnag Abdullayev being the only candidate. He was elected to serve a second term as head of the AFFA.

== Members ==
- President: Rovshan Najaf
- Regional Football Federation: Balakishi Gasimov (AFFA Vice-president), Elshad Nasirov (AFFA Vice-president), Sarkhan Hajiyev (AFFA Executive Vice-president)
- Professional Football League: Farid Mansurov, Gurban Gurbanov, Khayal Javarov, Magsud Adigozalov, Samad Gurbanov
- Sectional Football Federation: Leyla Khalilova Rzazada, Ulvi Mansurov
- Public Football Union: Konul Mehtiyeva: (AFFA Vice-president), Zaur Akhundov

== Relationship with FIFA ==
The country's football association received a major blow in April 2002, when UEFA imposed a two-year ban in response to a long-standing conflict between the AFFA and majority of the Azerbaijan Premier League clubs. The domestic championship was abandoned as a result of the conflict and the top clubs prevented their players from playing for the national team, with tax officials also probing allegations of fraud at the Azerbaijan federation.

== Principals ==
Office-holders
Office	Name	Tenure
President	Fuad Musayev	1992–2003
President	Ramiz Mirzayev	2003–2007
President	Elshad Nasirov	2007–2008
President	Rovnag Abdullayev	2008–2024
President	Rovshan Najaf	2024–present

== Competitions ==
It organizes the following competitions:

Men's football

- Azerbaijan Premier League (or Topaz Premyer Liqası); First league
- Azerbaijan First Division (or Birinci Divizion); Second league
- Azerbaijan Cup
- Azerbaijan Supercup
- Azerbaijan Futsal Premier League
- AFFA Amateur League

Women's football

- AFFA Qadınlar Super Liqası

== National teams ==
The AFFA also organises national football teams representing Azerbaijan at all age levels:

National team	Manager	Captain
Men's
Senior	(Portugal) Fernando Santos	Maksim Medvedev
Under-23	vacant	Ruslan Abışov
Under-21	(Serbia) Milan Obradović	Hajiagha Hajili
Under-20	(Serbia) Milan Obradović	Hajiagha Hajili
Under-19	(Azerbaijan) Samir Aliyev	Turan Valizade
Under-18	(Azerbaijan) Zaur Hashimov	Karim Diniyev
Under-17	(Azerbaijan) Vugar Mammad	Jalal Huseynov
Under-16	(Azerbaijan) Tabriz Hasanov	unknown
Under-15	(Azerbaijan) Aslan Kerimov	unknown
Futsal	(Brazil) Miltinho	Rizvan Farzaliyev
Beach soccer	(Azerbaijan) Zeynal Zeynalov	Elhad Guliyev
Women's
Senior	(Azerbaijan) Siyasat Asgarov	Aytaj Sharifova
Under-17	(Azerbaijan) Siyasat Asgarov	unknown

== Sponsorship ==
Companies that AFFA currently has sponsorship deals with include:

- Topaz - Official sponsor
- Bakcell - Official sponsor
- Atena - Official sponsor
- Unicef - Official sponsor
- Coca-Cola - Official sponsor
- AccessBank Azerbaijan - Official sponsor
- Clear - Official sponsor

== See also ==
- Professional Football League of Azerbaijan
