= Şenes Erzik =

Turkish football administrator (born 1942)

Personal details
- Born: Şenes Erzik; 18 September 1942 (age 84) Giresun, Turkey
- Education: Robert College

Şenes Erzik (born 18 September 1942 in Giresun, Turkey) is a retired football administrator. During his career he served as first vice-president of the Union of European Football Associations (UEFA). He was also a member of the FIFA Council.

== Biography ==
He was educated at Robert College in Istanbul, where he finished high school section and then the college's School of Business Administration and Economics in 1965. He worked in a diverse range of careers for a number of years in fields like banking for the Sınai Yatırım ve Kredi Bank, as a project manager for FAO/UNICEF and is still involved as an executive board member of the Cankurtaran Holding Inc in Turkey. He is fluent in English and French as well as his native Turkish.

He first got involved in football in 1977 when he was brought onto the board of the Turkish Football Federation (TFF). He was elected as the president in 1989, a position he held for eight years until he passed the torch to Haluk Ulusoy. After this he concentrated on his position in UEFA, where he has served since 1990. He has been a UEFA vice president since 1994, member of the FIFA Executive Committee since 1996, and holds a position as the honorary president of the TFF.

He has also had a large hand in Turkey's bids to host the European Championships in 2012, UEFA Champions League Final in 2005 which was awarded to the Atatürk Olympic Stadium in Istanbul and the UEFA Cup Final in 2009 which was held in Şükrü Saracoğlu Stadium.

Erzik is married and has a son.
