= AFFA Qadınlar Super Liqası =

Football league in Azerbaijan

- Organising bodies: AFFA
- First season: 2002
- Country: Azerbaijan
- Confederation: UEFA
- Number of clubs: 12 — (2026–2027)
- Level on pyramid: 1
- International cup: UEFA Champions League
- Current champions: Neftçi (2025/26)
- Most championships: Neftçi - Gömrükçü Baku (3 titles)
- Current: 2026–27 AFFA Qadınlar Super Liqası

The Qadınlar Super Liqası (Azerbaijani: AFFA Yüksək Qızlar Liqası) is the highest level of league competition in women's football in Azerbaijan.

== History ==
The league was played out from 2003 for some years. After that there first were no leagues and then only youth (U15, U17) ones.

The winning team of the league qualified for a spot in the UEFA Women's Cup. Gömrükçü Baku has represented Azerbaijan five times from 2002 to 2003 to 2006–07 and reached a quarter-final. Ruslan-93 Baku played the Women's Cup in 2007–08.

The first season after the hiatus was held in 2016/17 with Gabala FK winning the title. Sumgayit FK would win the next title before the league would return to a hiatus. It appears to have run for half a season in 2021–22, but no further information is available.

== Teams in the 2023–24 season ==
Team	Location	Ground
Baku Juniors	Baku	
Neftçi	Baku	
Sumgayit	Sumgayit	
Araz-Naxçıvan	Nakhchivan	
Inter	Khachmaz	
Gabala	Gabala	
Shamkir	Shamkir	
Balkhurma	Balaken	
Olimpiya	Aghjabadi	

== List of champions ==
The list of champions:

- 2003/04: Gömrükçü Baku (1)
- 2004: Gömrükçü Baku (2)
- 2005: Gömrükçü Baku (3)
- 2006: Ruslan-93 (1)
- 2007: Ruslan-93 (2)
- 2008-2015/16: youth leagues only
- 2016/17: Gabala FK (1)
- 2017/18: Sumqayıt FK (1)
- 2018/19-2022/23: not known
- 2023/24: Neftçi (1)
- 2024/25: Neftçi (2)
- 2025/26: Neftçi (3)
