= Azerbaijan Premier League =

Azerbaijani national top division professional association football league

- Organising body: Azerbaijan Professional Football League
- Founded: 1992; 34 years ago
- Country: Azerbaijan
- Confederation: UEFA
- Number of clubs: 12
- Level on pyramid: 1
- Relegation to: First League
- Domestic cup: Azerbaijan Cup
- International cup(s): UEFA Champions League; UEFA Europa League; UEFA Conference League
- Current champions: Sabah (1st title) (2025–26)
- Most championships: Qarabağ (12 titles)
- Broadcaster: CBC Sport
- Website: pfl.az
- Current: 2026–27 Azerbaijan Premier League

The Azerbaijan Premier League (Azerbaijani: Azərbaycan Premyer Liqası), also known as Misli Premyer Liqası for sponsorship reasons, is a professional association football league in Azerbaijan and the highest level of the Azerbaijani football league system. It is contested by twelve clubs.

Seasons run from August to May, with teams playing 33 matches each (playing each team in the league three times, with home venues for the third round determined by a draw). The Premier League champion secures the right to play in the UEFA Champions League first qualifying round. The runner-up and the 3rd-place winner secure the right to play in the UEFA Conference League starting in the second qualifying round.

Since 1992, a total of eight clubs have been crowned champions of the Azerbaijani football system. The Azerbaijan Premier League was first organized in 2007 and succeeded the Top Division (Azerbaijani: Yüksək Liqa), which existed from 1992 to 2007. The current champions are Sabah, who won the title in the 2025–26 season for the first time in their history.

== History ==
=== The 1990s ===
The league was dominated by teams like Qarabağ, Neftçi, Kapaz, Turan Tovuz and Shamkir. However, financial struggles had a bad impact on local clubs, and most teams such as Khazri Buzovna, Shamkir, Vilash Masalli and Shafa Baku went bust due increasing debts. Also, Qarabağ began to weaken due to financial problems. In 1997, Kapaz were known for their unbeaten run as the club's final record for the 1997–98 league campaign stood at 22 wins, 4 draws and 0 losses, out of 26 games total, an unbeaten run not matched in any single season by any team in an Azerbaijani league division. In the 1999 UEFA Intertoto Cup season, Qarabag became the first Azerbaijani club to advance to the next round of the European Cup.

=== The 2000s ===
As the league entered a new century, the Neftçi found themselves facing new challengers. They were challenged by emerging Khazar Lankaran, Inter Baku and Baku in both competitions. The country's football received major blow in 2002, when UEFA imposed a two-year ban in response to a long-standing conflict between the Association of Football Federations of Azerbaijan and majority of the country's top flight clubs. The domestic championship was abandoned as a result of the conflict and the top clubs prevented their players from playing for the national team, with tax officials also probing allegations of fraud at the Azerbaijan federation. Under the management of Agaselim Mirjavadov, Khazar Lankaran finished as Azerbaijan Cup winners in 2006 and 2007, while becoming league champions in 2006–07 despite losing the title to Neftçi in 2004–05 during Championship play-off. Qarabağ was the first-ever team from Azerbaijan to reach UEFA Europa League play off-round during the seasons 2009–10 and 2010–11. Few gave chances for qualification to the next round, although the Aghdam side caused quite a stir against favorites Rosenborg, Honka, Twente and Wisła Kraków.

=== The 2010s ===
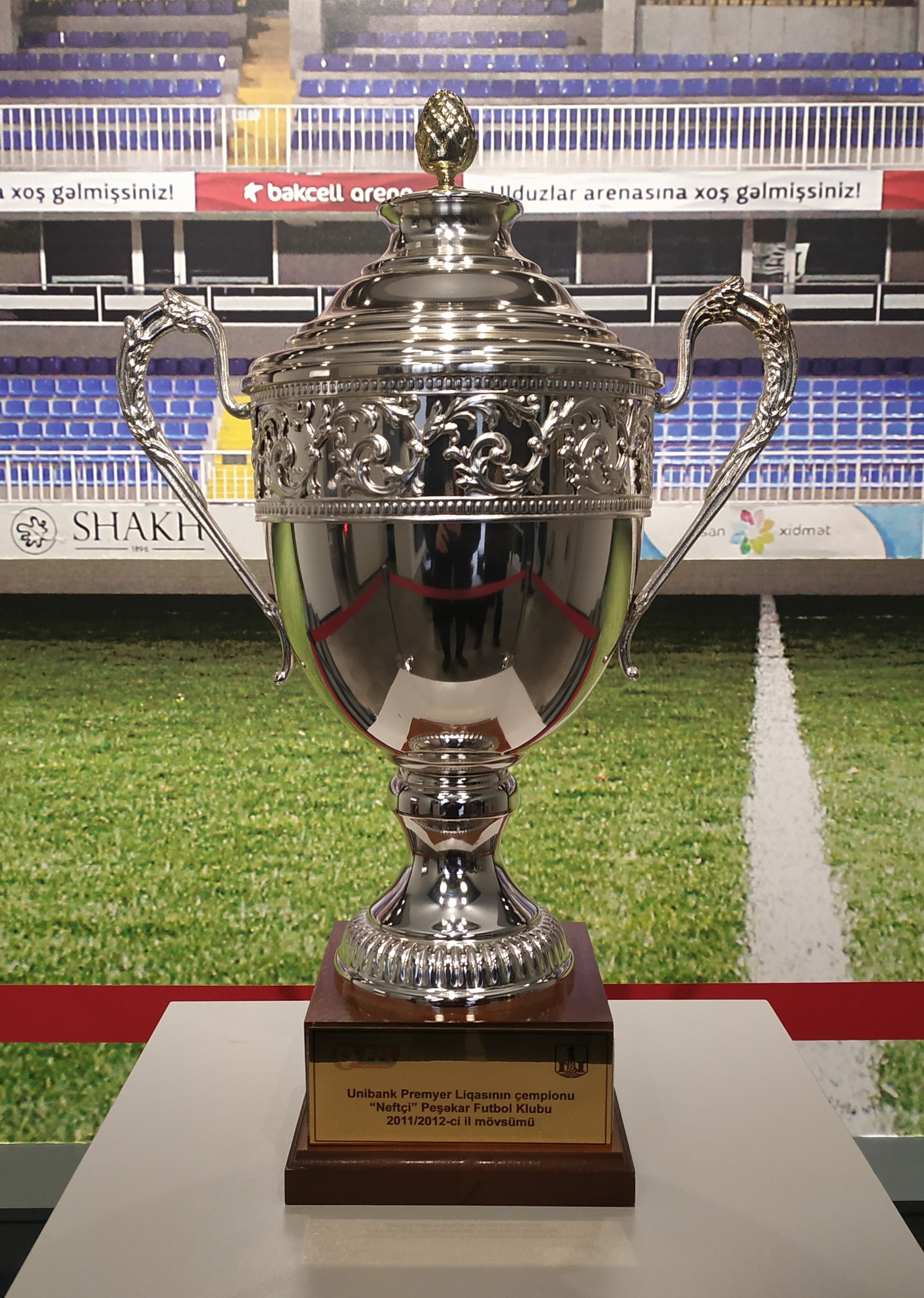
Azerbaijan Premier League 2011–12 trophy

The 2010s brought a bright start, with Neftçi emerging as a champion after six years of unsuccessful run. In the next season, Neftçi repeated its domestic success after sealing its seventh title in club's history. In that year, Neftçi Baku became the first Azerbaijani team to advance to the group stage of a European competition. In 2012–13 season, Neftçi managed to win three titles in a row. In 2013–14 season, Qarabağ managed to win its 2nd title after 21 years, and continue to win domestic title consecutively. In 2014, Qarabağ became the second and most successful Azerbaijani team to advance to the group stage of a European competition. After consecutive participation in the Europa League, in 2017, Qarabağ became the first Azerbaijani team to advance to the group stage of a Champions League.

=== The 2020s ===
On 19 June 2020, the AFFA announced that the 2019–20 season had officially ended without the resumption of the remaining matches due to the escalating situation of the COVID-19 pandemic in Azerbaijan. As a result, Qarabağ were crowned champions for the seventh season in a row, whilst also qualifying for the 2020–21 UEFA Champions League, with Neftçi, Keşla and Sumgayit qualifying for the 2020–21 UEFA Europa League.

The Azerbaijan Premier League has been expanded to 12 teams for the 2025–26 season due to the direct promotion of three teams from the First Division in 2024–25.

== Competition format ==
The competition follows the usual double round-robin format. During the course of a season, which lasts from August to May, each club plays every other club three times, two times at home and one time away, for a total of 33 games. Teams receive three points for a win, one point for a draw, and no points for a loss. Teams are ranked by total points, with the highest-ranked club at the end of the season crowned champion.

Beginning from 2025–26 season Azerbaijan Premier League is planned to be extended to 12 teams.

Below is a complete record of how many teams played in each season throughout the league's history;

- 26 clubs = 1992
- 20 clubs = 1993
- 16 clubs = 1993–94
- 13 clubs = 1994–95
- 11 clubs = 1995–96
- 16 clubs = 1996–98
- 14 clubs = 1998–99
- 12 clubs = 1999–00
- 11 clubs = 2000–01
- 12 clubs = 2001–02
- 15 clubs = 2003
- 14 clubs = 2003–04
- 18 clubs = 2004–05
- 14 clubs = 2005–09
- 12 clubs = 2009–13
- 10 clubs = 2013–16
- 8 clubs = 2016–22
- 10 clubs = 2022–25
- 12 clubs = 2025–present

=== Qualification for European competitions ===
The champions qualify for the UEFA Champions League, the second and third placed teams qualify for the UEFA Europa Conference League. As of the start of the 2020–21 Azerbaijan Premier League season qualification for European competitions is as follows: the champions qualify for the first qualifying round of the UEFA Champions League, runners-up and third placed team qualify for the first qualifying round of the Conference League. A fourth spot is given to the winner of the Azerbaijan Cup, who qualify for the first qualifying round of the Conference League. If the Azerbaijan Cup winner has already qualified for European competition through their league finish, the next highest placed club in the league takes their place.

== Members of the APL (2026–27 season) ==
Locations of the 2026–27 Azerbaijan Premier League teams

=== Stadia and locations ===
Note: Table lists in alphabetical order.

Team	Year Established	Location	Venue	Capacity
Araz Naxçıvan	1967	Nakhchivan, Baku	Dalga Arena	6,502
Imishli	2022	Imishli	Heydar Aliyev Stadium	8,500
Kapaz	1959	Ganja	Ganja City Stadium	15,343
Neftchi	1937	Baku	Neftchi Arena	10,289
Qabala	2005	Qabala	Gabala City Stadium	3,748
Qarabağ	1987	Aghdam, Baku	Tofiq Bahramov Stadium	31,200
Sabah	2017	Absheron	Bank Respublika Arena	8,969
Shafa	1998	Baku	TBD	TBD
Shamakhi	1997	Shamakhi	Shamakhi City Stadium	2,176
Sumgayit	2010	Sumgait	Mehdi Huseynzade Stadium	9,502
Turan Tovuz	2014	Tovuz	Tovuz City Stadium	6,500
Zira	2014	Zira, Baku	Zira Sport Complex	1,256

== Azerbaijan SSR Champions ==
- 1928: Progress-2 Baku
- 1929–33: unknown
- 1934: Profsoyuz Baku
- 1935: Stroitel Yuga Baku
- 1936: Stroitel Yuga Baku
- 1937: Lokomotiv Baku
- 1938: Lokomotiv Baku
- 1939: Lokomotiv Baku
- 1940: Lokomotiv Baku
- 1941–43: unknown
- 1944: Dinamo Baku
- 1945: Neftyanik Baku
- 1946: Lokomotiv Baku
- 1947: Trudovye Rezervy Baku
- 1948: KKF Baku
- 1949: KKF Baku
- 1950: Iskra Baku
- 1951: Ordjonikidzeneft Baku
- 1952: Ordjonikidzeneft Baku
- 1953: Ordjonikidzeneft Baku
- 1954: Zavod im. S.M. Budennogo Baku
- 1955: Ordjonikidzeneft Baku
- 1956: NPU Ordgonikidzeneft Baku
- 1957: NPU Ordjonikidzeneft Baku
- 1958: NPU Ordjonikidzeneft Baku
- 1959: Baku Teams (Spartakiada)
- 1960: SKA Baku
- 1961: Spartak Guba
- 1962: SKA Baku
- 1963: Araz Baku
- 1964: Polad Sumgait
- 1965: Vostok Baku
- 1966: Vostok Baku
- 1967: Araz Baku
- 1968: SKA Baku
- 1969: Araz Baku
- 1970: SKA Baku
- 1971: Khimik Salyany
- 1972: Surahanets Baku
- 1973: Araz Baku
- 1974: Araz Baku
- 1975: Araz Baku
- 1976: Araz Baku
- 1977: Karabakh Khankendi
- 1978: SKIF Baku
- 1979: SKA Baku
- 1980: Energetik Ali-Bayramly
- 1981: Gandjlik Baku
- 1982: Tokhudju Baku
- 1983: Termist Baku
- 1984: Termist Baku
- 1985: Khazar Sumgayit
- 1986: Göyəzən
- 1987: Araz Naxçıvan
- 1988: Qarabağ Ağdam
- 1989: Stroitel Sabirabad
- 1990: Qarabağ Ağdam
- 1991: Khazar Sumgayit

== Azerbaijani League Champions and Top Scorers ==
Season	Champion	Runner-up	Third place	Top scorers
1992	Neftçi	Khazar Sumgayit	Turan	(Azerbaijan) Nazim Aliyev (Khazar Sumgayit, 39 goals)
1993	Qarabağ	Khazar Sumgayit	Turan	(Azerbaijan) Samir Alakbarov (Neftçi, 16 goals)
1993–94	Turan	Qarabağ	Kapaz	(Azerbaijan) Musa Gurbanov (Turan, 35 goals)
1994–95	Kapaz	Turan	Neftçi	(Azerbaijan) Nazim Aliyev (Neftçi, 26 goals)
1995–96	Neftçi	Khazri Buzovna	Kapaz	(Azerbaijan) Fazil Parvarov (Kapaz, 23 goals) / Rovshan Ahmadov (Kapaz, 23 goals)
1996–97	Neftçi	Qarabağ	Khazri Buzovna	(Azerbaijan) Gurban Gurbanov (Neftçi, 34 goals)
1997–98	Kapaz	Baku	Shamkir	(Azerbaijan) Nazim Aliyev (Baku, 23 goals)
1998–99	Kapaz	Shamkir	Neftçi	(Azerbaijan) Alay Bahramov (Viləş Masallı, 24 goals)
1999–00	Shamkir	Kapaz	Neftçi	(Azerbaijan) Badri Kvaratskhelia (Shamkir, 16 goals)
2000–01	Shamkir	Neftçi	Vilash Masalli	(Azerbaijan) Pasha Aliyev (Bakili Baku, 12 goals)
2001–02	The AFFA and the clubs were discontinued due to the conflict between the clubs and the results were not taken into account.			
2002–03	Due to conflict between almost all clubs and the Association of Football Federations of Azerbaijan, no league championship was held.			
2003–04	Neftçi	Shamkir	Qarabağ	(Azerbaijan) Samir Musayev (Qarabağ, 20 goals)
2004–05	Neftçi	Khazar Lankaran	Karvan	(Azerbaijan) Zaur Ramazanov (Karvan, 21 goals)
2005–06	Baku	Karvan	Neftçi	(Ivory Coast) Yacouba Bamba (Karvan, 16 goals)
2006–07	Khazar Lankaran	Neftçi	Baku	(Azerbaijan) Zaur Ramazanov (Khazar Lankaran, 20 goals)
2007–08	Inter Baku	AZAL	Neftçi	(Azerbaijan) Khagani Mammadov (Inter Baku, 19 goals)
2008–09	Baku	Inter Baku	Simurq	(Uruguay) Walter Guglielmone (Inter Baku, 17 goals)
2009–10	Inter Baku	Baku	Qarabağ	(Azerbaijan) Farid Guliyev (Standard Baku, 16 goals)
2010–11	Neftçi	Khazar Lankaran	Qarabağ	(Georgia (country)) Georgi Adamia (Qarabağ, 18 goals)
2011–12	Neftçi	Khazar Lankaran	Inter Baku	(Uzbekistan) Bahodir Nasimov (Neftçi, 16 goals)
2012–13	Neftçi	Qarabağ	Inter Baku	(Chile) Nicolás Canales (Neftçi, 26 goals)
2013–14	Qarabağ	Inter Baku	Gabala	(Brazil) Reynaldo (Qarabağ, 22 goals)
2014–15	Qarabağ	Inter Baku	Gabala	(Azerbaijan) Nurlan Novruzov (Baku, 15 goals)
2015–16	Qarabağ	Zira	Gabala	(Spain) Dani Quintana (Qarabağ, 15 goals)
2016–17	Qarabağ	Gabala	Inter Baku	(Croatia) Filip Ozobić (Gabala, 11 goals) & (Azerbaijan) Rauf Aliyev (Inter Baku, 11 goals)
2017–18	Qarabağ	Gabala	Neftçi	(France) Bagaliy Dabo, (Gabala, 13 goals)
2018–19	Qarabağ	Neftçi	Səbail	(Azerbaijan) Mahir Madatov, (Qarabağ, 16 goals)
2019–20	Qarabağ	Neftçi	Keşla	(Iran) Peyman Babaei, (Sumgayit, 7 goals) & (France) Joseph-Monrose (Neftçi, 7 goals) & (France) Bagaliy Dabo (Neftçi, 7 goals) & (Azerbaijan) Mahir Emreli (Qarabağ, 7 goals)
2020–21	Neftçi	Qarabağ	Sumgayit	(Azerbaijan) Namik Alaskarov (Neftçi, 19 goals)
2021–22	Qarabağ	Neftçi	Zira	(Brazil) Kady (Qarabağ, 12 goals)
2022–23	Qarabağ	Sabah	Neftçi	(Azerbaijan) Ramil Sheydayev (Qarabağ, 22 goals)
2023–24	Qarabağ	Zira	Sabah	(Brazil) Juninho (Qarabağ, 20 goals)
2024–25	Qarabağ	Zira	Araz-Naxçıvan	(Cape Verde) Leandro Andrade (Qarabağ, 15 goals)
2025–26	Sabah	Qarabağ	Turan	(Rwanda) Joy-Lance Mickels (Sabah, 19 goals)

== Performances ==
=== Performance by club ===
Club	Winners	Runners-up	Third place	Winning years
Qarabağ	12	5	4	1993, 2013–14, 2014–15, 2015–16, 2016–17, 2017–18, 2018–19, 2019–20, 2021–22, 2022–23, 2023–24, 2024–25
Neftçi	9	5	7	1992, 1995–96, 1996–97, 2003–04, 2004–05, 2010–11, 2011–12, 2012–13, 2020–21
Kapaz	3	1	2	1994–95, 1997–98, 1998–99
Shamakhi	2	3	4	2007–08, 2009–10
Shamkir	2	2	1	1999–00, 2000–01
Baku	2	2	1	2005–06, 2008–09
Khazar Lankaran	1	3	–	2006–07
Turan Tovuz	1	1	3	1993–94
Sabah	1	1	1	2025–26
Zira	–	3	1	–
Gabala	–	2	3	–
Khazar Sumgayit	–	2	0	–
Karvan	–	1	1	–
Khazri Buzovna	–	1	1	–
Shuvalan	–	1	–	–
Araz-Naxçıvan	–	–	1	–
Sabail	–	–	1	–
Simurq	–	–	1	–
Sumgayit	–	–	1	–
Viləş Masallı	–	–	1	–

== League participation ==
Note: The tallies below include up to the 2026–27 season. Teams denoted in bold are current participants.

- **35** seasons: **Qarabağ**, **Neftçi**
- **26** seasons: **Shamakhi**, **Turan Tovuz**
- **25** seasons: **Kapaz**
- **20** seasons: **Gabala**
- **18** seasons: Baku
- **16** seasons: Khazar Lankaran, **Sumgayit**
- **12** seasons: Shuvalan, **Zira**
- **11** seasons: MOIK Baku, Viləş Masallı
- **10** seasons: Shahdag Qusar
- **9** seasons: ANS Pivani Bakı, Khazar Sumgayit, Shamkir, Simurq, **Sabah**
- **8** seasons: Sabail
- **7** seasons: ABN Barda, Energetik Mingaçevir, Karvan, **Shafa Baku**
- **6** seasons: **Araz-Naxçıvan**, Bakılı, Khazri Buzovna
- **4** seasons: Genclerbirliyi Sumqayit, İnşaatçı Baku, Ravan Baku
- **3** seasons: Azeri Baku, Göyazan Qazakh, Kürmük Qakh, Mil-Muğan, Mughan, Pambiqci Neftcala, Standard Sumgayit
- **2** seasons: Adliyya Baku, **Imishli**, Avei Agstafa, Avtomobilçi Yevlax, Azerbaijan U-18, Azneftyağ Baku, Daşqın Zaqatala, İnşaatçı Sabirabad, Ümid Cəlilabad
- **1** season: Boz Qurd Samukh, Çıraqqala Siyəzən, Energetik Əli-Bayramlı, Fərid Baku, Karat Bakı, Lokomotiv İmişli, Neftqaz Bakı, Plastik Salyan, Şirvan Kürdəmir, Şirvan Şamaxı, Ümid Bakı

=== Soviet Top League participation ===
- **27** seasons: Neftçi
- **1** season: Kapaz (as Dynamo Kirovabad), Stroitel Baku (as Temp Baku)

== Players ==
Azerbaijan Premier League clubs have almost complete freedom to sign whatever number and category of players they wish. There is no team or individual salary cap, no squad size limit, no age restrictions other than those applied by general employment law, no restrictions on the overall number of foreign players, and few restrictions on individual foreign players – all players with foreign nationality, including those able to claim a passport through a parent or grandparent, are eligible to play, and top players from outside the EU can obtain Azerbaijani work permits.

The only restriction on selection is the "Under-21 rule". This rule states that each club must include at least two players under the age of 21 in its matchday squad. Opinions on this rule appear to be divided among APL managers.

== Records ==
Players in the Premier League compete for the Azerbaijan Premier League Golden Boot, awarded to the top scorer at the end of each season. Nazim Aliyev is the league's all-time top scorer with 183 goals, including 39 in the 1992 season. During the 1995–96 season, he became the first player to score 100 Premier League goals. Since then, 10 other players have reached the 100-goal mark.

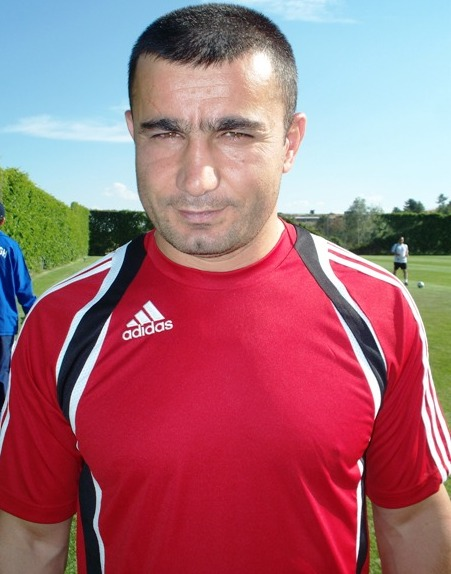
Gurban Gurbanov is one of the highest goalscorers in Premier League.

Top Ten Highest Goalscorers
Player		Period	Club	Goals
1	(Azerbaijan) Nazim Aliyev	1992–99	Neftchi Baku	183
2	(Azerbaijan) Mushfig Huseynov	1992–07	Qarabağ	125
3	(Azerbaijan) Rovshan Ahmadov	1992–03	Kapaz	116
4	(Azerbaijan) Gurban Gurbanov	1990–06	Neftçi	115
5	(Azerbaijan) Samir Alakbarov	1992–01	Neftçi	115
6	(Azerbaijan) Alay Bahramov	1992–99	Viləş Masallı	108
7	(Azerbaijan) Vadim Vasilyev	1994–07	Baki Fehlesi	102
8	(Azerbaijan) Khagani Mammadov	1994–12	Inter Baku	102
9	(Azerbaijan) Kanan Karimov	1995–12	Shamkir	101
10	(Azerbaijan) Nadir Nabiyev	1995–12	Turan	100

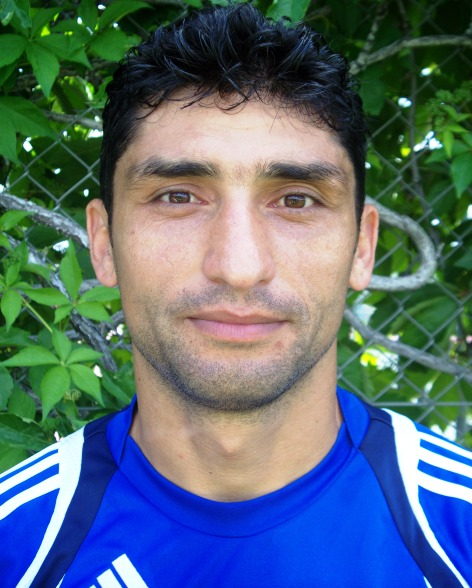
Aslan Kerimov is one of the most capped players in Premier League.

Top ten most capped players
Player		Period	Club	Games
1	(Azerbaijan) Rahid Amirguliyev	2005–23	Khazar Lankaran	451
2	(Azerbaijan) Mahmud Gurbanov	1992–12	Kapaz	421
3	(Azerbaijan) Rashad Sadiqov	1998–21	Neftchi	392
4	(Azerbaijan) Azer Mammadov	1992–12	Kapaz	388
5	(Azerbaijan) Asif Mammadov	2004–	Gabala	387
6	(Azerbaijan) Aslan Kerimov	1992–11	Qarabağ	382
7	(Azerbaijan) Rashad Abdullayev	1994–17	Khazar Lankaran	378
8	(Azerbaijan) Maksim Medvedev	2006-24	Qarabağ	376
9	(Azerbaijan) Elvin Mammadov	2005–2023	Baku	376
10	(Azerbaijan) Vurğun Hüseynov	2005–24	Sumgayit	368

As of match played 1 June 2024

Biggest home win
Kapaz 14–2 Shamkir (1997–98)
Most consecutive games unbeaten
Kapaz, 30 games, 1997–98
Youngest goalscorer
Orkhan Aliyev, for Sumgayit vs Gabala, 15 years old, 236 days
Oldest player
Nadir Shukurov, for Karvan vs Mughan, 42 years, 19 April 2009
All-time top scorer
Nazim Aliyev (Khazar Sumgayit, Neftçi, Qarabag, Shafa Baku, Dinamo Baku), (183 goals)
Most APL appearances
Mahmud Gurbanov, 421
Most goals in a season
Nazim Aliyev (Khazar Sumgayit), (39 goals), 1992

== UEFA ranking ==
UEFA Country Ranking for league participation after 2018–19 European football season.

As of 20 June 2019

Current Ranking	Movement	Last season Ranking	League	Coefficient
24	Substituted on	(28)	Kazakhstan Premier League	19.250
25	Substituted off	(21)	(Poland) Ekstraklasa	50.000
26	Substituted off	(23)	Azerbaijan Premier League	19.000
27	Substituted off	(18)	(Israel) Israeli Premier League	18.625
28	Steady	(24)	(Bulgaria) Bulgarian First League	17.500

== Finances ==
=== Attendances ===
Season	Total attendance	Number of matches	Average attendance per match	Ref
2001–02	187,929	171	1,099	
2002–03	League was cancelled *			
2003–04	195,840	144	1,360	
2004–05	470,670	290	1,623	
2005–06	183,365	169	1,085	
2006–07	225,216	144	1,564	
2007–08	277,667	169	1,643	
2008–09	309,582	182	1,701	
2009–10	340,522	172	1,979	
2010–11	418,418	192	2,179	
2011–12	433,342	192	2,256	
2012–13	364,910	192	1,900	
2013–14	281,400	175	1,608	

^{* UEFA has suspended the league after longstanding conflict between the Association of Football Federations of Azerbaijan and the majority of the country's top-flight clubs.}

=== Sponsorship ===
The UniBank, who had sponsored the league since 2009, did not renew their sponsorship at the end of the 2011–12 season. Talks began with Topaz betting operator, and a deal was confirmed shortly afterwards.

- 2009–12: Unibank Premyer Liqası
- 2012–19: Topaz Premyer Liqası

In August 2019, cooperation was suspended and PFL announced a new tender for sponsorship.

As well as sponsorship for the league itself, the Premier League has a number of official partners and suppliers. The technical sponsor for the league is Nike who is providing their match ball for the season.

=== Insolvency events ===
Since the APL began, five of its member clubs have entered administration, while nearly twenty clubs have liquidated. A reduction in revenue from ticket sales for APL games and club merchandise impacted negatively on club expenditures. Players were asked to consider wage cuts and team squads were reduced.

A major criticism of the Premier League in the mid-2000s was the emergence of gulf between the Premier League and the First Division. Criticism of the gap between clubs has continued, nevertheless, due to some clubs' increasing ability to spend more than the other Premier League clubs. For some clubs, including Shamkir, Karvan, Absheron, MKT-Araz who have failed to win immediate promotion back to the top flight, financial problems, including in some cases administration or even liquidation, have followed.

== Media coverage ==
Country	Broadcaster
Azerbaijan	CBC Sport
Austria	Laola1
Georgia	Laola1
Germany	Laola1
Russia	Laola1
Switzerland	Laola1
International	Bet365; LTV Channel

== Awards ==
=== Trophy ===
The current Azerbaijan Premier League trophy was developed by the Professional Football League of Azerbaijan, and the trophy has been awarded to the champion of Azerbaijan since the end of the 2009–10 season, replacing the previous Premier League trophy that had existed for only a few years.

=== Monthly and annual ===
In addition to the winner's Trophy and the individual winner's medal players receive, Azerbaijan Premier League also awards the monthly Player of the Month award. Following the season, the awards such as the Player of the Year, Manager of the Year, and Young Player of the Year from Azerbaijan Premier League are handed out.

== See also ==
- Azerbaijan First Division
- Azerbaijan Cup
- Football in Azerbaijan
- Soviet Top League
- List of foreign Azerbaijan Premier League players
