= Nazim Aliyev =

Azerbaijani footballer (born 1963)

Personal information
- Full name: Nazim Aliyev
- Date of birth: 5 April 1963 (age 63)
- Place of birth: Soviet Union
- Position: Forward

Youth career
- Neftchi

Senior career*
Years	Team	Apps	(Gls)
1988–1994	Khazar Sumgayit		
1994–1995	Neftchi		
1995	Qarabağ		
1998	Shafa Baku		
1998	Dinamo Baku		

International career
1993	Azerbaijan	1	(0)
- * Club domestic league appearances and goals

Nazim Aliyev (born 5 April 1963) is an Azerbaijani former professional footballer who played as a forward. He is the all-time top scorer of the Azerbaijan Premier League. He also played one game for the national team in 1993.

Aliyev began playing football for Neftchi Baku PFC's reserve side. He joined Soviet Second League side Khazar Sumgayit in 1988 and would play for the club until 1994.

== Honours ==
=== Individual ===
- Azerbaijan Premier League Top Scorer (3): 1992, 1994–95, 1997–98
