= AFFA Amateur League =

- Founded: 1992; 34 years ago
- Country: Azerbaijan
- Confederation: UEFA
- Number of clubs: 20
- International cup: UEFA Regions' Cup
- Current champions: Abşeron FK (2018-19)
- Current: 2020–21 AFFA Amateur League

The AFFA Amateur League is run by the Association of Football Federations of Azerbaijan (AFFA).

Amateur and professional teams compete in the league. They are divided into 2 groups and have 18 rounds. The top four teams in each of the two groups advance to the quarterfinals. The winner of this tournament represents Azerbaijan in the UEFA Regional Cup.

== Champions ==
Season	Champions
2000–01	Western
2001–02	
2002–03	Göyazan
2003–04	Hekeri
2004–05	Femida
2005–06	Femida
2006–07	
2007–08	Ağstafa
2008–09	
2009–10	Chevik
2010–11	
2011–12	Qaraçala
2012–13	MKT Ulduz
2013–14	Chagirghan (Sabirabad)
2014–15	Sharur
2015-16	Bine FK
2016–17	Uğur FK
2017-18	Absheron FK
2018-19	Liman FK
