= 2026–27 Azerbaijan Cup =

Tournament details
- Country: Azerbaijan
- Teams: 34

Tournament statistics
- Matches played: 18
- Goals scored: 107 (5.94 per match)
- All statistics correct as of 29 October 2026.

The 2026–27 Azerbaijan Cup, also named Bizon Azərbaycan Kuboku for sponsorship reasons, was the 35th season of the annual cup competition in Azerbaijan. The winners will qualify for the 2027–28 UEFA Europa League first qualifying round.

== Teams ==
Access list for 2025–26 Azerbaijani Cup
| | Teams entering in this round | Teams advancing from previous round |
|---|---|---|
| First round (12 teams) | 12 Azerbaijan Second League teams | —N/a |
| Second round (24 teams) | 10 Azerbaijan First League teams; 8 Azerbaijan Premier League teams | 6 winners from the first round |
| Last 16 (16 teams) | 4 Azerbaijan Premier League teams | 12 winners from the second round |
| Quarter-finals (8 teams) | —N/a | 8 winners from the last 16 |
| Semi-finals (4 teams) | —N/a | 4 winners from the quarter-finals |
| Final (2 teams) | —N/a | 2 winners from the semi-finals |

== First round ==
The draw for First, Second round and Last 16 was made on 18 September 2026.

| 7 October 2026 2 | Qaradağ Lökbatan | 12–0 | Şəki | Baku |
| 14:30 AZT (UTC+4) | Abasov 2'; Hajili 3', 49', 58'; Aliyev 11', 82'; Huseynli 16'; Mahmudov 17'; Novruzov 51', 78', 84'; Alizade 71' | Report | | Stadium: Lökbatan Olympic Sport Complex Stadium; Attendance: 70; Referee: Pərviz İbrahimov |

| 7 October 2026 5 | Shamkir | 1–5 | Ağstafa Gəncləri | Shamkir |
| 14:30 AZT (UTC+4) | Allahverdiyev 52' (yellow card) 68'; Hacıyev (yellow card) 72' | Report | Məmmədov 2' (yellow card) 78'; Qasımov 18', 40'; Namazov 24'; Alıyev 73' (pen.) | Stadium: Shamkir Olympic Sport Complex Stadium; Attendance: 30; Referee: Alik Yunusov |

| 8 October 2026 6 | Difai | 1–3 | Zəngəzur | Baku |
| 14:00 AZT (UTC+4) | Qurbanov 42' | Report | Voronsov 21', 27'; Mirzəliyev 42'; İsmayılov (yellow card) 45'; Atluxanov (yellow card) 71' | Stadium: Neftçi Arena Fouth Pitch; Attendance: 70; Referee: Murad Səlimov |

| 8 October 2026 1 | Marafon | 3–0 | Dinamo Baku | Baku |
| 14:30 AZT (UTC+4) | Səfərov (yellow card) 6'; Allahverdiyev 28'; Nəsibov 44'; Budaqov (yellow card) 51'; Qaraxanov 74' (pen.); Manafov (yellow card) 88' | Report | Qarayev (yellow card) 72' | Stadium: Marafon Arena; Attendance: 400; Referee: Səbuhi Bayramov |

| 8 October 2026 3 | Şirvan | 1–3 | Kür-Araz | Şirvan |
| 14:30 AZT (UTC+4) | Xəlilov 85'; Rəsulov (yellow card) 90+2' | Report | H.Əliyev 9'; B.Əliyev 32', 38' | Stadium: Shirvan City Olympic Spots Club; Attendance: 150; Referee: Nazim Abdullayev |

| 9 October 2026 4 | Ağdaş | 1–6 | Hypers | Agdash |
| 14:30 AZT (UTC+4) | Mahmudov 14'; Tahmazli (yellow card) 35'; Suleymanov (yellow card) 51' | Report | Tahmazli 4' (o.g.); Suleymanov (red card) 6'; Ashrafli 9', 77'; Azakhov (yellow card) 23'; Babazade 44', 73'; Nazarov 90' | Stadium: City Stadium; Attendance: 60; Referee: Mahmud Bağırzadə |

== Second round ==
| 27 October 2026 7 | Şimal | 0–6 | Araz-Naxçıvan | Shamakhi |
| 14:00 AZT (UTC+4) | | Report | Salyanski 11', 87', 90'; Muradov 51'; Rzayev 52'; Isgandarov 70' | Stadium: City Stadium; Referee: Kamran Əliyev |

| 27 October 2026 8 | Marafon | 1–0 | Zagatala | Baku |
| 14:00 AZT (UTC+4) | Allahverdiyev 59' | Report | | Stadium: Marafon Arena; Referee: İslam Məmmədov |

| 27 October 2026 10 | Kür-Araz | 0–11 | Sumgayit | Sumgait |
| 17:00 AZT (UTC+4) | Abdullayev (yellow card) 55'; Mirbabayev (yellow card) 87'; Vəlizadə (yellow card) 89' | Report | Süleymanly 3', 35'; N.Ahmedzade 28', 47', 56' (yellow card) 8'; Orujov 13', 84' (pen.); Kahat 42'; Badolo 65'; Vásquez 78'; Mustafayev 81'; Santana (yellow card) 89' | Stadium: Kapital Bank Arena; Attendance: 600; Referee: Niyaz Əhmədov |

| 27 October 2026 11 | Qabala | 3–0 | Mingachevir | Qabala |
| 17:00 AZT (UTC+4) | Shakarkhanov 38'; Çekiçi 41'; Silva 42'; Damadayev (yellow card) 52' | Report | Nuruyev (yellow card) 45'; Mürsəlov (yellow card) 75' | Stadium: City Stadium; Referee: Nazim Abdullayev |

| 27 October 2026 17 | Sabail | 2–2 (a.e.t.) (2–3 p) | Zira | Masazir |
| 18:00 AZT (UTC+4) | Nongoh (yellow card) 60' (yellow-red card) 80'; Bouderaa (yellow card) 75'; Dinho 90+1', 117'; Aghazade (yellow card) 117'; Dzhenetov (yellow card) FT | Report | Guima 9', 96'; Mchakhchekh (yellow card) 19'; Aydın (yellow card) 59'; Digbeu (yellow card) 78'; Bayramov (yellow card) FT | Stadium: Bank Respublika Arena; Attendance: 1,144; Referee: Səbuhi Bayramov |
| | Penalties |
| | Alxasov (penalty missed); Şahverdiyev (penalty missed); Guliyev (penalty scored); Haziyev (penalty missed); Dinho (penalty scored) | | (penalty missed) Renato; (penalty scored) Əlicanov; (penalty missed) Digbeu; (penalty scored) Guima; (penalty scored) Alıyev |

| 28 October 2026 9 | İmişli | 4–1 | Qaradağ Lökbatan | Yevlakh |
| 14:00 AZT (UTC+4) | Nabiyev 73'; Faracov 86', 90'; Cardoso 90+4' | Report | Alizada 44' | Stadium: City Stadium; Referee: Namiq Bəkirov |

| 28 October 2026 12 | MOIK Baku | 1–9 | Shahdag Qusar | Baku |
| 14:00 AZT (UTC+4) | Səfərov 46'; Mərdanov (red card) 73' | Report | Chipesse 28', 45', 79'; Messiah 43'; M.Isayev 54'; Bakhshaly 58'; Daouda 63', 66'; Asadov 81' | Stadium: Bine Stadium; Referee: Murad Səlimov |

| 28 October 2026 14 | Hypers | 1–5 | Şamaxı | Shamakhi |
| 14:00 AZT (UTC+4) | Məmmədov 62' | Report | Mammadov 4'; Adilkhanov 35'; Dego 60'; Ismayilov 74'; Akhvlediani 82' | Stadium: City Stadium; Referee: Şamil İmanzadə |

| 28 October 2026 15 | Shafa Baku | 9–2 | Ağstafa Gəncləri | Sumgait |
| 16:00 AZT (UTC+4) | Dansoko 3', 9', 28'; Fuller 14', 31'; Məmmədov 17', 30'; Qənbərov 25'; Mertens (penalty missed) 53'; Felipe 87' | Report | Kərimli (yellow card) 21'; Allahverdiyev (yellow card) 37'; Qasımov 44' (pen.); Alıyev 61' | Stadium: Kapital Bank Arena; Attendance: 50; Referee: Sənan Bayramzadə |

| 28 October 2026 18 | Kapaz | 3–1 | Baku Sporting | Ganja |
| 19:00 AZT (UTC+4) | Abdullayev 2'; Ba (yellow card) 58'; Alizade 76' (o.g.); Babayev 79' | Report | Babayi 12' (yellow card) 16'; Gasimov (yellow card) 62'; Abdullayev (yellow card) 83' | Stadium: City Stadium; Attendance: 5,000; Referee: Ruslan Quliyev |

| 29 October 2026 13 | Xankəndi | 2–3 (a.e.t.) | Ganjabasar | Shamakhi |
| 14:00 AZT (UTC+4) | Tamazov 42'; Mammadov (yellow card) 62'; Huseynov (yellow card) 75'; Lawrence (yellow card) 81'; Solomon 116'; Teymurov (yellow card) 118'; Abdullayev (yellow card) 118' | Report | Alizade (yellow card) 29' (goal) 66'; Madatov (yellow card) 72'; Achimi 110', 120' (pen.); Baghirov (yellow card) 113' | Stadium: City Stadium; Attendance: 20; Referee: Mahmud Bağırzadə |

| 29 October 2026 16 | Zəngəzur | 1–4 | Karvan | Baku |
| 14:00 AZT (UTC+4) | Guliyev (yellow card) 40'; Atlukhanov (yellow card) 45+1'; Qurbatov 51'; Rustamov (yellow card) 87' | Report | S.Abdullayev 60', 84' (penalty missed) 84'; Aziz (yellow card) 52' (goal) 67', 90+3'; Jafarli (yellow card) 75' | Stadium: Bine Stadium; Attendance: 40; Referee: Ceyhun Hüseynov |

== Last 16 ==
| 2027 19 | Araz-Naxçıvan | – | Marafon |
| AZT (UTC+4) |

| 2027 20 | Sabah | – | İmişli |
| AZT (UTC+4) |

| 2027 21 | Sumgayit | – | Qarabağ | Sumgait |
| AZT (UTC+4) | | | | Stadium: City Stadium |

| 2027 22 | Qabala | – | Shahdag Qusar |
| AZT (UTC+4) |

| 2027 23 | Ganjabasar | – | Şamaxı |
| AZT (UTC+4) |

| 2027 24 | Neftçi | – | Shafa Baku |
| AZT (UTC+4) |

| 2027 25 | Karvan | – | Zira |
| AZT (UTC+4) |

| 2027 26 | Turan Tovuz | – | Kapaz |
| AZT (UTC+4) |

== Scorers ==
As of match played 29 October 2026

3 goals:

- (Azerbaijan) Elçin Qasımov - Ağstafa Gəncləri
- (Azerbaijan) Agadadash Salyanski - Araz-Naxçıvan
- (Azerbaijan) Ajdar Hajili - Qaradağ Lökbatan
- (Azerbaijan) Ibrahim Novruzov - Qaradağ Lökbatan
- (Guinea) Bafodé Dansoko - Shafa Baku
- (Angola) Agostinho Chipesse - Shahdag Qusar
- (Azerbaijan) Nihad Ahmedzade - Sumgayit

2 goals:

- (Azerbaijan) Hüseyn Alıyev - Ağstafa Gəncləri
- (Azerbaijan) Tuhay Alizade - Ganjabasar
- (Azerbaijan) Vugar Ashrafli - Hypers
- (Azerbaijan) Asim Babazade - Hypers
- (Azerbaijan) Seykhan Faracov - İmişli
- (Azerbaijan) Samir Abdullayev - Karvan
- (Azerbaijan) Abdul Aziz - Karvan
- (Azerbaijan) Bayram Əliyev - Kür-Araz
- (Azerbaijan) İlham Allahverdiyev - Marafon
- (Azerbaijan) Ilkin Aliyev - Qaradağ Lökbatan
- (Portugal) Dinho - Sabail
- (Canada) Tray Fuller - Shafa Baku
- (Azerbaijan) Elmar Məmmədov - Shafa Baku
- (Senegal) Arsene Daouda - Shahdag Qusar
- (Azerbaijan) Nadir Orujov - Sumgayit
- (Azerbaijan) Aykhan Süleymanly - Sumgayit
- (Azerbaijan) Ruslan Voronsov - Zəngəzur
- (Mozambique) Guima - Zira

1 goals:

- (Azerbaijan) Umid Mahmudov - Ağdaş
- (Azerbaijan) Qəşəm Məmmədov - Ağstafa Gəncləri
- (Azerbaijan) Elgün Namazov - Ağstafa Gəncləri
- (Azerbaijan) Rövlan Muradov - Araz-Naxçıvan
- (Azerbaijan) Abdulla Rzayev - Araz-Naxçıvan
- (Azerbaijan) Ulvi Isgandarov - Araz-Naxçıvan
- (Azerbaijan) Ali Babayi - Baku Sporting
- (Azerbaijan) Elvin Qurbanov - Difai
- (Cameroon) Dylane Achimi - Ganjabasar
- (Azerbaijan) Mahmud Məmmədov - Hypers
- (Azerbaijan) Agil Nazarov - Hypers
- (Azerbaijan) Farid Nabiyev - İmişli
- (Portugal) Diogo Cardoso - İmişli
- (Azerbaijan) Vadim Abdullayev - Kapaz
- (Azerbaijan) Hüseyn Babayev - Kapaz
- (Azerbaijan) Həmzə Əliyev - Kür-Araz
- (Azerbaijan) Tofiq Nəsibov - Marafon
- (Azerbaijan) Pərviz Qaraxanov - Marafon
- (Azerbaijan) Qurban Səfərov - MOIK Baku
- (Albania) Endri Çekiçi - Qabala
- (Azerbaijan) Ziya Shakarkhanov - Qabala
- (Portugal) Bruno Silva - Qabala
- (Azerbaijan) Rəvan Abasov - Qaradağ Lökbatan
- (Azerbaijan) Ali Alizada - Qaradağ Lökbatan
- (Azerbaijan) Vusal Alizade - Qaradağ Lökbatan
- (Azerbaijan) Huseyn Huseynli - Qaradağ Lökbatan
- (Azerbaijan) Kamil Mahmudov - Qaradağ Lökbatan
- (Azerbaijan) Edqar Adilkhanov - Şamaxı
- (Azerbaijan) Habib Ismayilov - Şamaxı
- (Azerbaijan) Oruc Mammadov - Şamaxı
- (Georgia (country)) Tornike Akhvlediani - Şamaxı
- (Israel) David Dego - Şamaxı
- (Azerbaijan) Vüsal Qənbərov - Shafa Baku
- (Brazil) Luis Felipe - Shafa Baku
- (Angola) Messiah - Shahdag Qusar
- (Azerbaijan) Gülaga Asadov - Shahdag Qusar
- (Azerbaijan) Mehrac Bakhshaly - Shahdag Qusar
- (Azerbaijan) Məqsəd İsayev - Shahdag Qusar
- (Azerbaijan) Ruslan Allahverdiyev - Shamkir
- (Azerbaijan) Emil Mustafayev - Sumgayit
- (Burkina Faso) Cedric Badolo - Sumgayit
- (Dominican Republic) Ronaldo Vásquez - Sumgayit
- (Israel) Roi Kahat - Sumgayit
- (Azerbaijan) Elgün Xəlilov - Şirvan
- (Azerbaijan) Nihad Tamazov - Xankəndi
- (Nigeria) Mesoma Solomon - Xankəndi
- (Azerbaijan) Kənan Mirzəliyev - Zəngəzur
- (Azerbaijan) Tural Qurbatov - Zəngəzur

Own goals:

- (Azerbaijan) Nail Tahmazli - for Hypers vs Ağdaş 9 October 2026
- (Azerbaijan) Jafar Alizade - for Kapaz vs Baku Sporting 28 October 2026
