= 2026–27 Zira FK season =

Zira FK
2025–26 season
- Manager: Rashad Sadygov
- Stadium: Zira Olympic Sport Complex Stadium
- Premier League: 5th
- Azerbaijan Cup: Second Round
- UEFA Conference League: Second qualifying round
- Top goalscorer: League: Two Players (2); All: Eren Aydın (5)

The 2026–27 season is the thirteenth in the history of Zira FK and the twelfth consecutive season in the Azerbaijan Premier League. Besides the domestic league, Zira will participate in the Azerbaijan Cup, and where knocked out of the UEFA Conference League at the Second qualifying round.

== Season events ==
On 11 June, Zira announced the singing of Amin Seydiyev from Sabah to a two-year contract. Also on 11 June, Zira announced that they had extended their contracts with Eren Aydın for three seasons, Davit Volkovi, Aydın Bayramov and Elçin Əlicanov for two season whilst they exercised a one-year contract extension with Henrique.

On 20 June, Zira announced the singing of Maycon Cleiton from Portimonense, and the singing of Huseynali Guliyev from İmişli, both to two-year contracts.

On 23 June, Zira announced the singing of Vieirinha from Olympiakos Nicosia, and Aykhan Guseynov from Turan Tovuz, both to two-year contracts.

On 5 July, Zira announced the singing of Chris Digbeu from Valenciennes B to a five-year contract.

On 20 July, Zira announced the singing of Damaine Smith from Nova Star to a four-year contract.

On 21 July, Zira announced the singing of Bayéré Junior Loué from Javor Ivanjica to a two-year contract.

== Squad ==
As of match played 7 November 2026

No.	Name	Nationality	Position	Date of birth (age)	Signed from	Signed in	Contract ends	Apps.	Goals
Goalkeepers
1	Maycon Cleiton	(Brazil)	GK	8 November 1998 (age 28)	Portimonense	2026	2028	0	0
13	Aydın Bayramov	(Azerbaijan)	GK	18 February 1996 (age 30)	Turan Tovuz	2024	2028	51	0
41	Anar Nazirov	(Azerbaijan)	GK	8 September 1985 (age 41)	Gabala	2021		26	0
72	Huseynali Guliyev	(Azerbaijan)	GK	11 August 1999 (age 27)	İmişli	2026	2028	3	0
Defenders
2	Amin Seydiyev	(Azerbaijan)	DF	15 November 1998 (age 27)	Sabah	2026	2028	16	1
4	Ruan Renato	(Brazil)	DF	14 January 1994 (age 32)	Gabala	2023		140	18
5	Ange Mutsinzi	(Rwanda)	DF	15 November 1997 (age 28)	Jerv	2024	2027	94	1
14	Elçin Əlicanov	(Azerbaijan)	DF	15 July 1999 (age 27)	Kapaz	2024	2028	41	1
20	Issa Djibrilla	(Niger)	DF	1 January 1996 (age 30)	Ankara Keçiörengücü	2023		98	11
25	Henrique	(Brazil)	DF	5 January 1995 (age 31)	Leixões	2025	2027	29	0
33	Mehdi Mchakhchekh	(Morocco)	DF	23 February 2004 (age 22)	Raja CA	2026		8	1
57	Yusif Haciyev	(Azerbaijan)	DF	6 July 2006 (age 20)	Academy	2024		0	0
Midfielders
3	Dimitri Legbo	(Ivory Coast)	MF	30 August 2001 (age 25)	HNK Rijeka	2026		7	0
6	Hacıağa Hacılı	(Azerbaijan)	MF	30 January 1998 (age 28)	Qarabağ	2023		148	0
8	İsmayıl İbrahimli	(Azerbaijan)	MF	13 February 1998 (age 28)	Qarabağ	2025	2027	119	2
10	Giorgi Papunashvili	(Georgia (country))	MF	2 September 1995 (age 31)	Kapaz	2024		76	10
11	Aykhan Guseynov	(Azerbaijan)	MF	3 September 1999 (age 27)	Turan Tovuz	2026	2028	14	0
16	Ktatau	(Brazil)	MF	13 July 2001 (age 25)	Chaves	2026		2	0
17	Vieirinha	(Portugal)	MF	28 October 1996 (age 30)	Olympiakos Nicosia	2026	2028	10	0
21	Guima	(Mozambique)	MF	14 November 1995 (age 30)	Iğdır	2025	2027	50	3
23	Damaine Smith	(Jamaica)	MF	30 December 2005 (age 20)	Nova Star	2026	2031	1	0
29	Chris Digbeu	(Ivory Coast)	MF	10 January 2006 (age 20)	Valenciennes B	2026	2030	6	1
32	Qismət Alıyev (captain)	(Azerbaijan)	MF	24 October 1996 (age 30)	Gabala	2020		229	16
48	Ramiz Muradov	(Azerbaijan)	MF	6 July 2005 (age 21)	Unattached	2025		1	0
Forwards
7	Eren Aydın	(Turkey)	FW	12 February 2003 (age 23)	Veres Rivne	2026	2029	29	10
9	Davit Volkovi	(Georgia (country))	FW	3 June 1995 (age 31)	Sabah	2024	2028	155	49
27	Bayéré Junior Loué	(Ivory Coast)	FW	14 January 2001 (age 25)	Javor Ivanjica	2026	2028	5	0
77	Yegor Bogomolsky	(Belarus)	FW	3 June 2000 (age 26)	Neftçi	2025	2027	25	1
87	Abdul Aziz Batibie	(Togo)	FW	26 May 2007 (age 19)	Pumas FC d'Ablogamé	2025	2029	2	0
Out on loan
Left during the season
11	Martins Júnior	(Brazil)	MF	7 November 1999 (age 27)	Kapaz	2024	2027	69	10
93	Brahim Konaté	(France)	MF	20 March 1996 (age 30)	Şamaxı	2025	2027	34	4

== Transfers ==
=== In ===
Date	Position	Nationality	Name	From	Fee	Ref.
11 June 2026	DF	(Azerbaijan)	Amin Seydiyev	Sabah	Undisclosed	
20 June 2026	GK	(Brazil)	Maycon Cleiton	Portimonense	Undisclosed	
20 June 2026	GK	(Azerbaijan)	Huseynali Guliyev	İmişli	Undisclosed	
23 June 2026	MF	(Portugal)	Vieirinha	Olympiakos Nicosia	Undisclosed	
23 June 2026	MF	(Azerbaijan)	Aykhan Guseynov	Turan Tovuz	Undisclosed	
5 July 2026	MF	(Azerbaijan)	Chris Digbeu	Valenciennes B	Undisclosed	
20 July 2026	MF	(Jamaica)	Damaine Smith	Nova Star	Undisclosed	
21 July 2026	FW	(Ivory Coast)	Bayéré Junior Loué	Javor Ivanjica	Undisclosed	

=== Out ===
Date	Position	Nationality	Name	To	Fee	Ref.
21 August 2026	MF	(Brazil)	Martins Júnior	Preah Khan Reach Svay Rieng	Undisclosed	

=== Released ===
Date	Position	Nationality	Name	Joined	Date	Ref
20 June 2026	MF	(France)	Iron Gomis	Troyes	16 July 2026	
24 June 2026	MF	(Azerbaijan)	Rövlan Muradov	Araz-Naxçıvan	25 June 2026	
3 August 2026	MF	(France)	Brahim Konaté	Nea Salamis		
7 August 2026	MF	(Azerbaijan)	Namiq Ələsgərov	Kapaz	10 August 2026	

== Competitions ==
=== Overall record ===
Competition	First match	Last match	Starting round	Final position	Record							
Competition	First match	Last match	Starting round	Final position	Pld	W	D	L	GF	GA	GD	Win %
Premier League	16 August 2026		Matchday 1		11	5	4	2	16	15	+1	45.45
Azerbaijan Cup	2026		Round of 16		1	0	1	0	2	2	+0	0.00
UEFA Conference League	8 July 2026	30 July 2026	First qualifying round	Second qualifying round	4	2	1	1	7	2	+5	50.00
Total					16	7	6	3	25	19	+6	43.75

Last updated: 7 November 2026
Source: Competitions

=== Premier League ===
==== League table ====
Pos	Team	Pld	W	D	L	GF	GA	GD	Pts	Qualification or relegation
3	Turan Tovuz	11	6	3	2	12	8	+4	21	Qualification for the Conference League second qualifying round (Note: The 2026–27 Azerbaijan Cup winner will qualify for the Europa League first qualifying round. If the cup winner finishes in the top three, the second Conference League berth will be passed to the fourth place team.)
4	Qarabağ	10	5	4	1	14	8	+6	19	
5	Zira	11	5	4	2	16	15	+1	19	
6	Kapaz	10	5	2	3	10	10	0	17	
7	Shamakhi	11	3	5	3	17	16	+1	14	

Updated to match(es) played on 8 November 2026. Source: Soccerway
Rules for classification: 1) Points; 2) Matches won; 3) Goal difference; 4) Goals scored; 5) Head-to-head points; 6) Head-to-head goal difference; 7) Lower number of points based on yellow and red cards; 8) Draw.

==== Results summary ====
Overall								Home						Away					
Pld	W	D	L	GF	GA	GD	Pts	W	D	L	GF	GA	GD	W	D	L	GF	GA	GD
11	5	4	2	16	15	+1	19	5	2	0	13	6	+7	0	2	2	3	9	−6

Last updated: 7 November 2026.

==== Results by round ====
Round	1	2	3	4	5	6	7	8	9	10	11
Ground	H	H	H	A	H	A	H	A	H	A	H
Result	W	W	W	L	D	L	D	D	W	D	W
Position	4	2	1	4	3	5	5	6	5	6	5

Updated to match(es) played on 7 November 2026. Source:
A = Away; H = Home; W = Win; D = Draw; L = Loss

==== Matches ====
16 August 2026 1	Zira	2–0	Shafa Baku	Zirə
21:00 AZT (UTC+4)	Aydın 41'; Djibrilla 52'; Renato (yellow card) 56'; Guima (yellow card) 56'	Report	Dragu (yellow card) 38'; Diaw (yellow card) 90+1'	Stadium: Zira Olympic Sport Complex Stadium; Attendance: 800; Referee: Elvin Bayramov

22 August 2026 2	Zira	3–1	İmişli	Zirə
20:45 AZT (UTC+4)	Guima (yellow card) 9'; Aydın 43'; Renato 80'; Volkovi 90+5'	Report	Rollo (yellow card) 76'; Almeida 83'; Juninho (yellow card) 86'; Ingilabli (yellow card) 90+2'; Banguera (yellow card) 90+5'; Salahlı (yellow card) FT	Stadium: Zira Olympic Sport Complex Stadium; Attendance: 600; Referee: Əli Əliyev

30 August 2026 3	Zira	1–0	Neftçi	Zirə
20:15 (UTC+4)	Guima (yellow card) 26'; Alıyev 45+4'; Renato (yellow card) 80'	Report	Mathew (yellow card) 4'; Badalov (yellow card) 35' (yellow-red card) 70'	Stadium: Zira Olympic Sport Complex Stadium; Attendance: 1,100; Referee: Elçin Məsiyev

5 September 2026 4	Sabah	5–0	Zira	Masazir
18:30 AZT (UTC+4)	Simić 7'; Mickels 14' (pen.), 30', 57'; Almeida (yellow card) 50'; Nwachukwu 51'	Report	Ktatau (yellow card) 23'	Stadium: Bank Respublika Arena; Attendance: 1,752; Referee: İnqilab Məmmədov

13 September 2026 5	Zira	1–1	Qarabağ	Zirə
19:00 (UTC+4)	İbrahimli (yellow card) 28'; Djibrilla 55'; Hacılı (yellow card) 85'	Report	Silva (yellow card) 50'; Kashchuk 65'; Várkonyi (yellow card) 70'	Stadium: Zira Olympic Sport Complex Stadium; Attendance: 1,300; Referee: Rəşad Əhmədov

19 September 2026 6	Turan Tovuz	1–0	Zira	Tovuz
17:30 AZT (UTC+4)	Marandici (yellow card) 56'; Damjanović 90+6'	Report	Renato (yellow card) 11'; Hacılı (yellow card) 90+3'; Seydiyev (yellow card) 90+4'; Alıyev (yellow card) 90+6'	Stadium: City Stadium; Attendance: 4,000; Referee: Rəvan Həmzəzadə

10 October 2026 7	Zira	1–1	Şamaxı	Zirə
17:00 AZT (UTC+4)	Guima (yellow card) 17'; Mutsinzi 68'	Report	Shuaibu 53'; Bouali (yellow card) 55'; Rüstəmov (yellow card) 87'	Stadium: Zira Olympic Sport Complex Stadium; Attendance: 250; Referee: Fərid Hacıyev

18 October 2026 8	Kapaz	1–1	Zira	Ganja
18:30 AZT (UTC+4)	Seyidov (yellow card) 40'; Domgjoni (yellow card) 44'; Benito 57'	Report	Əlicanov (yellow card) 82'; Volkovi 89'	Stadium: City Stadium; Attendance: 13,800; Referee: Emin Əliyev

23 October 2026 9	Zira	3–2	Sumgayit	Zirə
19:00 AZT (UTC+4)	Renato 8' (pen.); Guima 21'; Volkovi 84'	Report	Ahmedzade 39'; Keffel 57'; Suliman (yellow card) 90+4'	Stadium: Zira Olympic Sport Complex Stadium; Attendance: 800; Referee: Tural Qurbanov

31 October 2026 10	Araz-Naxçıvan	2–2	Zira	Shamakhi
15:00 AZT (UTC+4)	Andrade 21'; Salyanski 61'; Boli (yellow card) 90+3'	Report	Aydın 68'; Mchakhchekh 87' (yellow card) 87'	Stadium: City Stadium; Attendance: 300; Referee: Elvin Bayramov

7 November 2026 11	Zira	2–1	Qabala	Zirə
18:30 AZT (UTC+4)	Volkovi 11'; Əlicanov (yellow card) 45+1'; Digbeu 89'	Report	Akinade 14' (yellow card) 23'	Stadium: Zira Olympic Sport Complex Stadium; Attendance: 550; Referee: İnqilab Məmmədov

20 November 2026 12	İmişli	–	Zira	Yevlakh
14:30 AZT (UTC+4)		Report		Stadium: City Stadium

=== Azerbaijan Cup ===
27 October 2026 Second Round	Sabail	2–2 (a.e.t.) (2–3 p)	Zira	Masazir
18:00 AZT (UTC+4)	Nongoh (yellow card) 60' (yellow-red card) 80'; Bouderaa (yellow card) 75'; Dinho 90+1', 117'; Aghazade (yellow card) 117'; Dzhenetov (yellow card) FT	Report	Guima 9', 96'; Mchakhchekh (yellow card) 19'; Aydın (yellow card) 59'; Digbeu (yellow card) 78'; Bayramov (yellow card) FT	Stadium: Bank Respublika Arena; Attendance: 1,144; Referee: Səbuhi Bayramov
	Penalties
	Alxasov (penalty missed); Şahverdiyev (penalty missed); Guliyev (penalty scored); Haziyev (penalty missed); Dinho (penalty scored)		(penalty missed) Renato; (penalty scored) Əlicanov; (penalty missed) Digbeu; (penalty scored) Guima; (penalty scored) Alıyev

2027 Last 16	–	Zira
AZT (UTC+4)

=== UEFA Conference League ===
==== Qualifying rounds ====
8 July 2026 First qualifying round 1st leg	Zira (Azerbaijan)	3–0	(Georgia (country)) Torpedo Kutaisi	Sumgait, Azerbaijan
20:00 AZT (UTC+4)	Renato 32', 63' (pen.); Volkovi 47'; Papunashvili (yellow card) 57'; Alıyev (yellow card) 66'	Report	Kuprava (yellow card) 21'; Bukia (yellow card) 50'; Goshadze (yellow card) 62'; Cherif (yellow card) 90'	Stadium: City Stadium; Attendance: 1,490; Referee: Joni Hyytiä (Finland)
Note: Zira played their home matches at Sumgayit City Stadium in Sumgait instead of their own stadium, Zira Olympic Sport Complex Stadium in Zira, which did not fulfil UEFA requirements.

16 July 2026 First qualifying round 2nd leg	Torpedo Kutaisi (Georgia (country))	0–3 (0–6 agg.)	(Azerbaijan) Zira	Kutaisi, Georgia
20:00 AZT (UTC+4)		Report	Aydın 25', 70'; Seydiyev 39'; Vieirinha (yellow card) 55'	Stadium: Ramaz Shengelia Stadium; Attendance: 3,500; Referee: Mihály Káprály (Hungary)

23 July 2026 Second qualifying round 1st leg	Paide Linnameeskond (Estonia)	1–0	(Azerbaijan) Zira	Pärnu, Estonia
20:00 AZT (UTC+4)	S.Luts (yellow card) 36'; Baranov (yellow card) 62'; Cham 87'	Report	Seydiyev (yellow card) 76'	Stadium: Pärnu Rannastaadion; Attendance: 943; Referee: Roman Jitari (Moldova)
Note: Paide played their home matches in the first and second qualifying rounds at Pärnu Rannastaadion in Pärnu, rather than at their regular home ground, the Paide kunstmuruväljak in Paide, which did not fulfil UEFA requirements.

30 July 2026 Second qualifying round 2nd leg	Zira (Azerbaijan)	1–1 (1–2 agg.)	(Estonia) Paide Linnameeskond	Sumgait, Azerbaijan
20:00 AZT (UTC+4)	Aydın 5'; Júnior (yellow card) 83'	Report	D.Luts (yellow card) 57'; Anier 71'	Stadium: City Stadium; Attendance: 1,500; Referee: Dario Bel (Croatia)
Note: Zira played their home matches at Sumgayit City Stadium in Sumgait instead of their own stadium, Zira Olympic Sport Complex Stadium in Zira, which did not fulfil UEFA requirements.

== Squad statistics ==
As of match played 7 November 2026

=== Appearances and goals ===
No.	Pos	Nat	Player	Total		Premier League		Azerbaijan Cup		UEFA Conference League	
No.	Pos	Nat	Player	Apps	Goals	Apps	Goals	Apps	Goals	Apps	Goals
2	DF	(Azerbaijan) AZE	Amin Seydiyev	16	1	9+2	0	1	0	3+1	1
3	MF	(Ivory Coast) CIV	Dimitri Legbo	7	0	5+1	0	0+1	0	0	0
4	DF	(Brazil) BRA	Ruan Renato	16	4	11	2	1	0	4	2
5	DF	(Rwanda) RWA	Ange Mutsinzi	16	1	11	1	0+1	0	3+1	0
6	MF	(Azerbaijan) AZE	Hacıağa Hacılı	12	0	1+9	0	1	0	0+1	0
7	FW	(Turkey) TUR	Eren Aydın	14	6	7+2	3	1	0	4	3
8	MF	(Azerbaijan) AZE	İsmayıl İbrahimli	13	0	6+3	0	0	0	0+4	0
9	FW	(Georgia (country)) GEO	Davit Volkovi	15	5	8+3	4	0	0	4	1
10	MF	(Georgia (country)) GEO	Giorgi Papunashvili	10	0	1+5	0	0	0	1+3	0
11	MF	(Azerbaijan) AZE	Aykhan Guseynov	14	0	9+2	0	1	0	1+1	0
13	GK	(Azerbaijan) AZE	Aydın Bayramov	13	0	8	0	1	0	4	0
14	DF	(Azerbaijan) AZE	Elçin Əlicanov	6	0	2+3	0	0+1	0	0	0
16	MF	(Brazil) BRA	Ktatau	2	0	2	0	0	0	0	0
17	MF	(Portugal) POR	Vieirinha	10	0	5+1	0	0	0	4	0
20	DF	(Niger) NIG	Issa Djibrilla	14	2	5+4	2	1	0	2+2	0
21	MF	(Mozambique) MOZ	Guima	14	3	10	1	1	2	3	0
23	MF	(Jamaica) JAM	Damaine Smith	1	0	0	0	0+1	0	0	0
27	FW	(Ivory Coast) CIV	Bayéré Junior Loué	5	0	3+1	0	0	0	0+1	0
29	MF	(Ivory Coast) CIV	Chris Digbeu	6	1	1+2	1	1	0	0+2	0
32	MF	(Azerbaijan) AZE	Qismət Alıyev	16	1	9+2	1	1	0	4	0
33	DF	(Morocco) MAR	Mehdi Mchakhchekh	8	1	5+2	1	1	0	0	0
72	GK	(Azerbaijan) AZE	Huseynali Guliyev	3	0	3	0	0	0	0	0
77	FW	(Belarus) BLR	Yegor Bogomolsky	3	0	0	0	0	0	0+3	0
Players away on loan:
Players who left Zira during the season:
11	MF	(Brazil) BRA	Martins Júnior	4	0	0	0	0	0	3+1	0
93	MF	(France) FRA	Brahim Konaté	4	0	0	0	0	0	4	0

=== Goal scorers ===
Place	Position	Nation	Number	Name	Premier League	Azerbaijan Cup	UEFA Conference League	Total
1	FW	(Turkey)	7	Eren Aydın	3	0	3	6
2	FW	(Georgia (country))	9	Davit Volkovi	4	0	1	5
3	DF	(Brazil)	4	Ruan Renato	2	0	2	4
4	MF	(Mozambique)	21	Guima	1	2	0	3
5	DF	(Niger)	20	Issa Djibrilla	2	0	0	2
6	MF	(Azerbaijan)	32	Qismət Alıyev	1	0	0	1
6	DF	(Rwanda)	5	Ange Mutsinzi	1	0	0	1
6	DF	(Morocco)	33	Mehdi Mchakhchekh	1	0	0	1
6	MF	(Ivory Coast)	29	Chris Digbeu	1	0	0	1
6	DF	(Azerbaijan)	2	Amin Seydiyev	0	0	1	1
				TOTALS	16	2	7	25

=== Clean sheets ===
Place	Position	Nation	Number	Name	Premier League	Azerbaijan Cup	UEFA Conference League	Total
1	GK	(Azerbaijan)	13	Aydın Bayramov	2	0	2	4
				TOTALS	2	0	2	4

=== Disciplinary record ===
Number	Nation	Position	Name	Premier League		Azerbaijan Cup		UEFA Conference League		Total	
Number	Nation	Position	Name	Yellow card	Red card	Yellow card	Red card	Yellow card	Red card	Yellow card	Red card
2	(Azerbaijan)	DF	Amin Seydiyev	1	0	0	0	1	0	2	0
4	(Brazil)	DF	Ruan Renato	3	0	0	0	0	0	3	0
6	(Azerbaijan)	MF	Hacıağa Hacılı	2	0	0	0	0	0	2	0
7	(Turkey)	FW	Eren Aydın	0	0	1	0	0	0	1	0
8	(Azerbaijan)	MF	İsmayıl İbrahimli	1	0	0	0	0	0	1	0
10	(Georgia (country))	MF	Giorgi Papunashvili	0	0	0	0	1	0	1	0
11	(Azerbaijan)	MF	Aykhan Guseynov	1	0	0	0	0	0	1	0
13	(Azerbaijan)	GK	Aydın Bayramov	0	0	1	0	0	0	1	0
14	(Azerbaijan)	DF	Elçin Əlicanov	3	0	0	0	0	0	3	0
16	(Brazil)	MF	Ktatau	1	0	0	0	0	0	1	0
17	(Portugal)	MF	Vieirinha	0	0	0	0	1	0	1	0
21	(Mozambique)	MF	Guima	4	0	0	0	0	0	4	0
29	(Ivory Coast)	MF	Chris Digbeu	0	0	1	0	0	0	1	0
32	(Azerbaijan)	MF	Qismət Alıyev	1	0	0	0	1	0	2	0
33	(Morocco)	DF	Mehdi Mchakhchekh	1	0	1	0	0	0	2	0
Players away on loan:
Players who left Zira during the season:
11	(Brazil)	MF	Martins Júnior	0	0	0	0	1	0	1	0
			TOTALS	18	0	4	0	5	0	27	0
