= 2026–27 Neftçi PFK season =

Neftçi
2026–27 season
- Manager: Yuriy Vernydub
- Stadium: Neftçi Arena
- Premier League: Preseason
- Azerbaijan Cup: Preseason
- UEFA Conference League: Second qualifying round vs Dinamo Minsk

The 2026–27 is Neftçi's 35th Azerbaijan Premier League season. The team will also compete in the Azerbaijan Cup, and the UEFA Conference League.

== Season overview ==
On 27 May, Neftçi announced the signing of Rufat Abbasov from Şamaxı to a three-year contract.

On 20 June, Neftçi announced the signing of Gustavo Klismahn from Santa Clara to a two-year contract with the option of an additional year.

On 24 June, Neftçi announced the signing of Andreaw Gravillon from Pescara to a two-year contract.

On 26 June, Neftçi announced the signing of Ľubomír Tupta from AE Larissa to a two-year contract with the option of an additional year.

On 22 July, Neftçi announced the permanent signing of Freddy Vargas from Maccabi Netanya to a two-year contract with the option of an additional year.

On 11 August, Neftçi announced the signing of Alen Skribek from Zalaegerszeg to a two-year contract with the option of an additional year.

On 14 August, Neftçi announced that Imad Faraj had left the club to sign for ES Tunis.

On 18 August, Neftçi announced the signing of Dragoljub Savić from TSC to a two-year contract with the option of an additional year.

On 26 August, Neftçi announced that Alessio Curci had left the club after his contract was ended by mutual agreement.

On 28 August, Neftçi announced the signing of Denzel Jubitana from Atromitos to a two-year contract.

On 31 August, Neftçi announced the signing of Vicko Ševelj from Dundee United to a three-year contract.

On 7 September, Neftçi announced the signing of Adeleke Akinyemi from Gnistan to a two-year contract, with the option of an additional year.

On 14 September, Neftçi announced that they had extended their contract with Emil Safarov for another 2 seasons, with the option of a third year, and that their contract with Elvin Camalov had been terminated by mutual agreement.

== Squad ==
As of match played 6 November 2026

No.	Name	Nationality	Position	Date of birth (age)	Signed from	Signed in	Contract ends	Apps.	Goals
Goalkeepers
1	Emil Balayev	(Azerbaijan)	GK	17 April 1994 (age 32)	Sabail	2023	2025	37	0
81	Mahdi Hasanov	(Azerbaijan)	GK	23 July 2008 (age 18)	Academy	2025		0	0
93	Rza Jafarov	(Azerbaijan)	GK	3 July 2003 (age 23)	Academy	2022	2028	65	0
Defenders
3	Rufat Abbasov	(Azerbaijan)	DF	1 January 2005 (age 21)	Şamaxı	2026	2029	13	1
5	Igor Ribeiro	(Brazil)	DF	4 October 1996 (age 30)	Araz-Naxçıvan	2025	2027	40	2
14	Elvin Badalov	(Azerbaijan)	DF	14 June 1995 (age 31)	Sumgayit	2025	2027	96	2
17	Murad Khachayev	(Azerbaijan)	DF	14 April 1998 (age 28)	Sumgayit	2025	2027	21	0
24	Moustapha Seck	(Senegal)	DF	23 February 1996 (age 30)	Portimonense	2024	2027	66	0
36	Hasan Mahmudov	(Azerbaijan)	DF	3 October 2007 (age 19)	Academy	2025		0	0
55	Andreaw Gravillon	(Guadeloupe)	DF	8 February 1998 (age 28)	Pescara	2026	2028	13	1
77	Falaye Sacko	(Senegal)	DF	1 May 1995 (age 31)	Montpellier	2025	2027(+1)	40	1
80	Aslan Shirinov	(Azerbaijan)	DF	17 January 2005 (age 21)	Academy	2026		1	0
Midfielders
6	Sessi D'Almeida	(Benin)	MF	20 November 1995 (age 30)	Apollon Limassol	2025	2027(+1)	27	1
7	Emil Safarov	(Azerbaijan)	MF	30 October 2002 (age 24)	Gabala	2024	2028(+1)	56	4
8	Emin Mahmudov	(Azerbaijan)	MF	27 April 1992 (age 34)	Boavista	2017		298	73
11	Alen Skribek	(Hungary)	MF	11 April 2001 (age 25)	Zalaegerszeg	2026	2028 (+1)	11	3
18	Ifeanyi Mathew	(Nigeria)	MF	20 January 1997 (age 29)	Unattached	2025	2026(+1)	38	3
20	Gustavo Klismahn	(Brazil)	MF	23 November 1999 (age 26)	Santa Clara	2026	2028 (+1)	13	4
22	Denzel Jubitana	(Suriname)	MF	6 May 1999 (age 27)	Atromitos	2026	2028	4	0
27	Dragoljub Savić	(Serbia)	MF	25 April 2001 (age 25)	TSC	2026	2028 (+1)	9	1
70	Andriy Shtohrin	(Ukraine)	MF	14 December 1998 (age 27)	Chornomorets Odesa	2024	2027	42	4
88	Vicko Ševelj	(Croatia)	MF	19 September 2000 (age 26)	Dundee United	2026	2029	8	0
Forwards
10	Freddy Vargas	(Venezuela)	FW	1 April 1999 (age 27)	Maccabi Netanya	2026	2028 (+1)	44	6
26	Adeleke Akinyemi	(Nigeria)	FW	11 August 1998 (age 28)	Gnistan	2026	2028 (+1)	6	2
29	Ľubomír Tupta	(Slovakia)	FW	27 March 1998 (age 28)	AE Larissa	2026	2028 (+1)	12	2
33	Breno Almeida	(Brazil)	FW	29 July 1998 (age 28)	Ethnikos Achna	2026	2028	25	13
97	Bassala Sambou	(Germany)	FW	15 October 1997 (age 29)	Enosis Neon Paralimni	2025	2026	52	15
Away on loan
19	Agadadash Salyanski	(Azerbaijan)	FW	19 June 2004 (age 22)	Academy	2022		50	7
Left during the season
4	Elvin Camalov	(Azerbaijan)	MF	4 February 1995 (age 31)	Sabah	2025	2026 (+1)	29	1
11	Imad Faraj	(France)	FW	11 February 1999 (age 27)	AEK Larnaca	2025	2028	34	7
13	Kenan Pirić	(Bosnia and Herzegovina)	GK	7 July 1994 (age 32)	Antalyaspor	2025	2027	29	0
28	Alessio Curci	(Luxembourg)	FW	16 February 2002 (age 24)	Francs Borains	2025	2028	19	2

== Transfers ==
=== In ===
Date	Position	Nationality	Name	From	Fee	Ref.
27 May 2026	DF	(Azerbaijan)	Rufat Abbasov	Şamaxı	Undisclosed	
20 June 2026	MF	(Brazil)	Gustavo Klismahn	Santa Clara	Undisclosed	
24 June 2026	DF	(Guadeloupe)	Andreaw Gravillon	Pescara	Undisclosed	
26 June 2026	FW	(Slovakia)	Ľubomír Tupta	AE Larissa	Undisclosed	
22 July 2026	FW	(Venezuela)	Freddy Vargas	Maccabi Netanya	Undisclosed	
11 August 2026	MF	(Hungary)	Alen Skribek	Zalaegerszeg	Undisclosed	
18 August 2026	MF	(Serbia)	Dragoljub Savić	TSC	Undisclosed	
28 August 2026	MF	(Suriname)	Denzel Jubitana	Atromitos	Undisclosed	
31 August 2026	MF	(Croatia)	Vicko Ševelj	Dundee United	Undisclosed	
7 September 2026	FW	(Nigeria)	Adeleke Akinyemi	Gnistan	Undisclosed	

=== Out ===
Date	Position	Nationality	Name	To	Fee	Ref.
26 May 2026	MF	(Azerbaijan)	Murad Mammadov	Pafos	Undisclosed	
14 August 2026	FW	(France)	Imad Faraj	Pafos	Undisclosed	

=== Released ===
Date	Position	Nationality	Name	Joined	Date	Ref
19 June 2026	MF	(Ecuador)	Jordan Rezabala			
26 August 2026	FW	(Luxembourg)	Alessio Curci			
2 September 2026	GK	(Bosnia and Herzegovina)	Kenan Pirić	Riga	4 September 2026	
14 September 2026	MF	(Azerbaijan)	Elvin Camalov	Qabala	16 September 2026	

== Friendlies ==
	–
(UTC+4)

== Competitions ==
=== Overview ===
Competition	First match	Last match	Starting round	Final position	Record							
Competition	First match	Last match	Starting round	Final position	Pld	W	D	L	GF	GA	GD	Win %
Premier League	16 August 2026		Matchday 1		11	7	3	1	26	11	+15	63.64
Azerbaijan Cup	2026				0	0	0	0	0	0	+0	—
UEFA Conference League	22 July 2026	30 July 2026	Second qualifying round	Second qualifying round	2	1	0	1	3	4	−1	50.00
Total					13	8	3	2	29	15	+14	61.54

Last updated: 6 November 2026
Source: Competitions

=== Premier League ===
==== Results summary ====
Overall								Home						Away					
Pld	W	D	L	GF	GA	GD	Pts	W	D	L	GF	GA	GD	W	D	L	GF	GA	GD
11	7	3	1	26	11	+15	24	3	2	0	11	2	+9	4	1	1	15	9	+6

Last updated: 6 November 2026.
Source: See Results

==== Results by round ====
Round	1	2	3	4	5	6	7	8	9	10	11
Ground	A	H	A	H	A	A	H	A	H	A	H
Result	W	W	L	W	W	W	D	D	D	W	W
Position	1	1	2	2	2	1	1	2	2	1	1

Updated to match(es) played on 6 November 2026. Source: See Results
A = Away; H = Home; W = Win; D = Draw; L = Loss; P = Bye

==== Results ====
16 August 2062 1	Sumgayit	1–3	Neftçi	Sumgait
19:00 (UTC+4)	Orujov 67'; Ahmedzade (yellow card) 74'; Abdullazade (red card) 74'	Report	Almeida 23', 55' (yellow card) 74'; Tupta 31' (yellow card) 88'; Sacko (yellow card) 47'; D'Almeida (yellow card) 74'	Stadium: Kapital Bank Arena; Attendance: 1,350; Referee: Kamal Umudlu

23 August 2026 2	Neftçi	5–0	Araz-Naxçıvan	Baku
20:45 (UTC+4)	Almeida 14', 17'; Sacko 35'; Ribeiro 41'; Gravillon (yellow card) 86' (goal) 90'; Skribek (yellow card) 86'	Report	Kané (yellow card) 4'; Isgandarov (yellow card) 90+3'	Stadium: Neftçi Arena; Attendance: 1,670; Referee: Rəşad Əhmədov

30 August 2026 3	Zira	1–0	Neftçi	Zirə
20:15 (UTC+4)	Guima (yellow card) 26'; Alıyev 45+4'; Renato (yellow card) 80'	Report	Mathew (yellow card) 4'; Badalov (yellow card) 35' (yellow-red card) 70'	Stadium: Zira Olympic Sport Complex Stadium; Attendance: 1,100; Referee: Elçin Məsiyev

5 September 2026 4	Neftçi	4–1	Shafa Baku	Baku
20:30 (UTC+4)	Abbasov 35'; Skribek 64', 66'; Almeida 79' (pen.); Gravillon (yellow card) 80'	Report	Musayev 48'; Felipe (yellow card) 58'	Stadium: Neftçi Arena; Attendance: 1,460; Referee: Əliyar Ağayev

11 September 2026 5	İmişli	2–3	Neftçi	Yevlakh
16:30 (UTC+4)	Hasanalizade 29'; Salahlı 45+7' (pen.); Ingilabli (yellow card) FT	Report	Vargas 11'; Almeida 28'; Klismahn (yellow card) 68' (goal) 80'	Stadium: City Stadium; Attendance: 600; Referee: Kamranbəy Rəhimov

18 September 2026 6	Gabala	0–3	Neftçi	Qabala
17:30 AZT (UTC+4)		Report	Almeida 25'; Ševelj (yellow card) 54'; Skribek (yellow card) 65'; Abbasov (yellow card) 77'; Akinyemi 86'; Tupta 90+2'	Stadium: City Stadium; Attendance: 800; Referee: Cavid Cəlilov

9 October 2026 7	Neftçi	0–0	Sabah	Baku
19:30 (UTC+4)	Sacko (yellow card) 77'; Tupta (yellow card) 89'	Report	Du Queiroz (yellow card) 45'; Simić (yellow card) 77'; McCarthy (yellow card) 90+2'	Stadium: Neftçi Arena; Attendance: 7,076; Referee: Rauf Cabarov

17 October 2026 8	Qarabağ	3–3	Neftçi	Baku
19:00 (UTC+4)	Kashchuk 18'; Cephas 88'; Kady 90+4'	Report	Klismahn 11', 33' (yellow card) 77'; Tupta (yellow card) 41'; Savić 52'; Safarov (yellow card) 90+4'} Sacko (yellow card) FT; Ribeiro (yellow card) FT	Stadium: Republican Stadium; Attendance: 13,500; Referee: Kamal Umudlu

24 October 2026 9	Neftçi	1–1	Turan Tovuz	Baku
19:00 (UTC+4)	Ribeiro (red card) 29'; Klismahn (yellow card) 42'; Almeida 44'; Badalov (yellow card) 70'; Ševelj (yellow card) 86'	Report	Balau (yellow card) 52'; Janković 73'; Silva (yellow card) 74'; Hurtado (yellow card) 90'	Stadium: Neftçi Arena; Attendance: 4,460; Referee: Əli Əliyev

1 November 2026 10	Şamaxı	2–3	Neftçi	Shamakhi
15:00 (UTC+4)	Shuaibu 24'; Fernandes (yellow card) 54'; Bouali 64'; Apolinário (yellow card) 65'	Report	Klismahn 14'; Almeida 49'; Mathew (yellow card) 62'; Akinyemi 75'; Abbasov (yellow card) 89'	Stadium: City Stadium; Attendance: 1,300; Referee: Tural Qurbanov

6 November 2026 11	Neftçi	1–0	Kapaz	Baku
20:00 (UTC+4)	Skribek 67' (yellow card) 78'	Report	Seyidov (yellow card) 20'; Ələsgərov (yellow card) 88'; Samadov (yellow card) 88'	Stadium: Neftçi Arena; Attendance: 3,275; Referee: Rəşad Əhmədov

22 November 2026 12	Araz-Naxçıvan	–	Neftçi	Shamakhi
14:30 (UTC+4)		Report		Stadium: City Stadium

==== League table ====
Pos	Team	Pld	W	D	L	GF	GA	GD	Pts	Qualification or relegation
1	Neftçi	11	7	3	1	26	11	+15	24	Qualification for the Champions League first qualifying round
2	Sabah	10	6	3	1	22	6	+16	21	Qualification for the Conference League second qualifying round (Note: The 2026–27 Azerbaijan Cup winner will qualify for the Europa League first qualifying round. If the cup winner finishes in the top three, the second Conference League berth will be passed to the fourth place team.)
3	Turan Tovuz	11	6	3	2	12	8	+4	21	Qualification for the Conference League second qualifying round
4	Qarabağ	10	5	4	1	14	8	+6	19	
5	Zira	11	5	4	2	16	15	+1	19	

Updated to match(es) played on 8 November 2026. Source: Soccerway
Rules for classification: 1) Points; 2) Matches won; 3) Goal difference; 4) Goals scored; 5) Head-to-head points; 6) Head-to-head goal difference; 7) Lower number of points based on yellow and red cards; 8) Draw.

=== Azerbaijan Cup ===
Last 16	Neftçi	–	Shafa Baku	Baku
AZT (UTC+4)				Stadium: Neftçi Arena

=== UEFA Conference League ===
==== Qualifying rounds ====
22 July 2026 Second qualifying round 1st leg	Neftçi (Azerbaijan)	2–4	(Belarus) Dinamo Minsk	Baku, Azerbaijan
20:00 (UTC+4)	Mahmudov 2'; Selyava 8' (o.g.); Sacko (yellow card) 54'	Report	Vardanyan 36', 57'; Abdullahi (yellow card) 45+2'; Malashevich 47'; Alykulov (penalty missed) 77' 77'	Stadium: Neftçi Arena; Attendance: 7,684; Referee: Konstantinos Fellas (Cyprus)
Note: Due to the Russian invasion of Ukraine, Ukrainian teams were required to play their home matches at neutral venues until further notice.

30 July 2026 Second qualifying round 2nd leg	Dinamo Minsk (Belarus)	0–1 (4–3 agg.)	(Azerbaijan) Neftçi	Stara Zagora, Bulgaria
21:00 (UTC+4)	Sokolovskiy (yellow card) 24'; Gweth (yellow card) 88'	Report	Almeida 12'; Gravillon (yellow card) 30'; Sacko (red card) 90+4'	Stadium: Stadion Beroe; Attendance: 40; Referee: Tim Marshall (Northern Ireland)
Note: Due to Belarus' involvement in the Russian invasion of Ukraine, Belarusian teams were required to play their home matches at neutral venues and behind closed doors until further notice.

== Squad statistics ==
As of match played 6 November 2026

=== Appearances and goals ===
No.	Pos	Nat	Player	Total		Premier League		Azerbaijan Cup		UEFA Conference League	
No.	Pos	Nat	Player	Apps	Goals	Apps	Goals	Apps	Goals	Apps	Goals
1	GK	(Azerbaijan) AZE	Emil Balayev	12	0	10	0	0	0	2	0
3	DF	(Azerbaijan) AZE	Rufat Abbasov	13	1	11	1	0	0	1+1	0
5	DF	(Brazil) BRA	Igor Ribeiro	9	1	7	1	0	0	1+1	0
6	MF	(Benin) BEN	Sessi D'Almeida	4	0	1+1	0	0	0	1+1	0
7	MF	(Azerbaijan) AZE	Emil Safarov	10	0	3+5	0	0	0	0+2	0
8	MF	(Azerbaijan) AZE	Emin Mahmudov	10	1	5+3	0	0	0	2	1
10	MF	(Venezuela) VEN	Freddy Vargas	10	1	8+2	1	0	0	0	0
11	MF	(Hungary) HUN	Alen Skribek	11	3	7+4	3	0	0	0	0
14	DF	(Azerbaijan) AZE	Elvin Badalov	6	0	5+1	0	0	0	0	0
17	DF	(Azerbaijan) AZE	Murad Khachayev	4	0	2	0	0	0	2	0
18	MF	(Nigeria) NGR	Ifeanyi Mathew	10	0	5+3	0	0	0	1+1	0
20	MF	(Brazil) BRA	Gustavo Klismahn	13	4	6+5	4	0	0	2	0
22	MF	(Suriname) SUR	Denzel Jubitana	4	0	2+2	0	0	0	0	0
24	DF	(Senegal) SEN	Moustapha Seck	3	0	0+2	0	0	0	1	0
26	FW	(Nigeria) NGR	Adeleke Akinyemi	6	2	2+4	2	0	0	0	0
27	MF	(Serbia) SRB	Dragoljub Savić	9	1	2+7	1	0	0	0	0
29	FW	(Slovakia) SVK	Ľubomír Tupta	12	2	8+2	2	0	0	2	0
33	FW	(Brazil) BRA	Breno Almeida	13	10	11	9	0	0	2	1
55	DF	(Guadeloupe) GLP	Andreaw Gravillon	13	1	8+3	1	0	0	2	0
77	DF	(Mali) MLI	Falaye Sacko	12	1	10	1	0	0	2	0
80	DF	(Azerbaijan) AZE	Aslan Shirinov	1	0	0+1	0	0	0	0	0
88	MF	(Croatia) CRO	Vicko Ševelj	8	0	6+2	0	0	0	0	0
93	GK	(Azerbaijan) AZE	Rza Jafarov	2	0	1	0	0	0	0+1	0
97	FW	(Germany) GER	Bassala Sambou	9	0	1+6	0	0	0	0+2	0
Players away on loan:
Players who left Neftçi during the season:
4	MF	(Azerbaijan) AZE	Elvin Camalov	1	0	0+1	0	0	0	0	0
11	FW	(France) FRA	Imad Faraj	2	0	0	0	0	0	2	0

=== Goal scorers ===
Place	Position	Nation	Number	Name	Premier League	Azerbaijan Cup	UEFA Conference League	Total
1	FW	(Brazil)	33	Breno Almeida	9	0	1	10
2	MF	(Brazil)	20	Gustavo Klismahn	4	0	0	4
3	MF	(Hungary)	11	Alen Skribek	3	0	0	3
4	FW	(Slovakia)	29	Ľubomír Tupta	2	0	0	2
4	FW	(Nigeria)	26	Adeleke Akinyemi	2	0	0	2
6	DF	(Mali)	77	Falaye Sacko	1	0	0	1
6	DF	(Brazil)	5	Igor Ribeiro	1	0	0	1
6	DF	(Guadeloupe)	55	Andreaw Gravillon	1	0	0	1
6	DF	(Azerbaijan)	3	Rufat Abbasov	1	0	0	1
6	MF	(Venezuela)	10	Freddy Vargas	1	0	0	1
6	MF	(Serbia)	27	Dragoljub Savić	1	0	0	1
6	MF	(Azerbaijan)	8	Emin Mahmudov	0	0	1	1
6				Own goal	0	0	1	1
				TOTALS	26	0	3	29

=== Clean sheets ===
Place	Position	Nation	Number	Name	Premier League	Azerbaijan Cup	UEFA Conference League	Total
1	GK	(Azerbaijan)	1	Emil Balayev	4	0	1	5
				TOTALS	4	0	1	5

=== Disciplinary record ===
Number	Nation	Position	Name	Premier League		Azerbaijan Cup		UEFA Conference League		Total	
Number	Nation	Position	Name	Yellow card	Red card	Yellow card	Red card	Yellow card	Red card	Yellow card	Red card
3	(Azerbaijan)	DF	Rufat Abbasov	2	0	0	0	0	0	2	0
5	(Brazil)	DF	Igor Ribeiro	1	1	0	0	0	0	1	1
6	(Benin)	MF	Sessi D'Almeida	1	0	0	0	0	0	1	0
7	(Azerbaijan)	MF	Emil Safarov	1	0	0	0	0	0	1	0
11	(Hungary)	MF	Alen Skribek	3	0	0	0	0	0	3	0
14	(Azerbaijan)	DF	Elvin Badalov	3	1	0	0	0	0	3	1
18	(Nigeria)	MF	Ifeanyi Mathew	2	0	0	0	0	0	2	0
20	(Brazil)	MF	Gustavo Klismahn	3	0	0	0	0	0	3	0
29	(Slovakia)	FW	Ľubomír Tupta	3	0	0	0	0	0	3	0
33	(Brazil)	FW	Breno Almeida	1	0	0	0	0	0	1	0
55	(Guadeloupe)	DF	Andreaw Gravillon	2	0	0	0	1	0	3	0
77	(Mali)	DF	Falaye Sacko	3	0	0	0	1	1	4	1
88	(Croatia)	MF	Vicko Ševelj	2	0	0	0	0	0	2	0
Players away on loan:
Players who left Neftçi during the season:
			TOTALS	27	2	0	0	2	1	29	3
