= 2024–25 Gabala FK season =

Gabala
2024–25 season
- President: Fariz Najafov
- Manager: Kakhaber Tskhadadze
- Stadium: City Stadium
- First Division: Champions
- Azerbaijan Cup: Last 16 vs Qarabağ
- Top goalscorer: League: Domi Massoumou (15); All: Domi Massoumou (17)
- Highest home attendance: 800 (vs Qarabağ, 4 December 2024)
- Lowest home attendance: 150 (vs MOIK Baku, 7 November 2024); 150 (vs Qaradağ Lökbatan, 19 December 2024); 150 (vs Jabrayil, 8 May 2025)
- Average home league attendance: 299

The 2024–25 season is Gabala FK's 20th season, and their 1st season back in the Azerbaijan First Division, after being relegated at the end of the 2023–24 season.

== Season overview ==
On 26 June, Gabala announced the signing of Urfan Ismayilov from Qaradağ Lökbatan to a two-year contract, and the signing of Vugar Hasanov from Sabail to a two-year contract.

On 28 June, Gabala announced the signing of Salman Alasgarov from Shamakhi to a two-year contract.

On 1 August, Gabala announced the signing of free-agent Səlahət Ağayev to a one-year contract.

On 14 August, Gabala announced the signing of free-agent Elvin Yunuszade to a one-year contract.

On 20 August, Gabala announced the signing of Domi Massoumou from CSMD Diables Noirs to a two-year contract.

On 23 August, Gabala announced the signing of free-agent Laurent Mendy to a two-year contract.

On 4 September, Gabala announced the signing of Ruslan Voronsov from Jabrayil to a one-year contract with the option of an additional year.

On 5 September, Gabala announced the signing of Samir Hasanov from Neftçi to a one-year contract with the option of an additional year.

On 12 September, Gabala announced the signing of Abdullahi Shuaibu to a one-year contract, with the option of an additional year, after he'd left Kapaz at the end of the previous season.

On 16 September, Gabala announced the season-long loan signing of Oche Ochowechi from Kryvbas Kryvyi Rih. On the same day, Gabala announced the signing of Elshad Taghiyev to a one-year contract, with the option of an additional year, after he'd left Shamakhi at the end of the previous season.

On 17 September, Araz-Naxçıvan announced the season-long loan signing of Senan Ağalarov from Gabala.

On 31 January, Gabala announced that they had ended their contracts with Laurent Mendy and Vugar Hasanov, whilst Mehrac Bakhshali had joined Mingəçevir on loan for the next 18-months.

On 11 February, Gabala announced the return of Ibrahim Ramazanov, on loan from Turan Tovuz until the summer of 2026.

Following their 5–0 victory over Baku Sporting on 4 April, Gabala secured promotion back to the Azerbaijan Premier League at their first attempt.

On 29 May, Gabala announced that Mushfiq Nadirov, Samir Hasanov and Ruslan Vorontsov had left the club after their contracts had expired, and that Ibrahim Ramazanov and Oche Ochowechi had returned to their parent clubs following their loan spells.

On 30 May, Gabala announced that Emil Süleymanov had joined Shamakhi on loan for the upcoming 2025–26 season.

== Squad ==
As of match played 22 May 2025

No.	Name	Nationality	Position	Date of birth (age)	Signed from	Signed in	Contract ends	Apps.	Goals
Goalkeepers
1	Səlahət Ağayev	(Azerbaijan)	GK	4 January 1991 (aged 34)	Sabail	2024	2025	60	0
12	Mushfiq Nadirov	(Azerbaijan)	GK	24 May 2002 (aged 22)	Zagatala	2024		0	0
94	Habib Hushanov	(Azerbaijan)	GK	16 October 2007 (aged 17)	Academy	2023		3	0
Defenders
5	Samir Hasanov	(Azerbaijan)	DF	10 April 2003 (aged 22)	Neftçi	2024	2025 (+1)	17	0
13	Nicat Aliyev	(Azerbaijan)	DF	24 September 2001 (aged 23)	Sumgayit	2022		50	4
25	Ibrahim Ramazanov	(Azerbaijan)	DF	10 October 2004 (aged 20)	on loan from Turan Tovuz	2025	2026	9	0
26	Elnur Mustafayev	(Azerbaijan)	DF	11 March 2006 (aged 19)	Academy	2024		3	0
28	Murad Musayev	(Azerbaijan)	DF	13 June 1994 (aged 30)	Zira	2019		159	7
32	Elvin Yunuszade	(Azerbaijan)	DF	22 August 1992 (aged 32)	Unattached	2024	2025	22	0
44	Salman Alasgarov	(Azerbaijan)	DF	9 June 2001 (aged 23)	Shamakhi	2024	2026	9	2
66	Nuqay Rashidov	(Azerbaijan)	DF	20 January 2004 (aged 21)	Unattached	2023		25	1
74	Suleyman Damadayev	(Azerbaijan)	DF	1 March 2003 (aged 22)	Shamakhi	2024		28	0
Midfielders
6	Emil Süleymanov	(Azerbaijan)	MF	15 March 2004 (aged 21)	Academy	2023		27	0
8	Urfan Ismayilov	(Azerbaijan)	MF	17 May 1996 (aged 29)	Qaradağ Lökbatan	2024	2026	27	1
10	Shahin Shahniyarov	(Azerbaijan)	MF	1 January 2005 (aged 20)	Academy	2023		37	3
11	Asif Mammadov	(Azerbaijan)	MF	5 August 1986 (aged 38)	Inter Baku	2015	2025	263	17
21	Ziya Shakarkhanov	(Azerbaijan)	MF	26 July 2007 (aged 17)	Academy	2024		6	0
27	Eshqin Ahmadov	(Azerbaijan)	MF	6 November 2005 (aged 19)	Academy	2023		11	1
Forwards
9	Ruslan Voronsov	(Azerbaijan)	FW	19 October 1995 (aged 29)	Jabrayil	2024	2025 (+1)	18	2
14	Domi Massoumou	(Republic of the Congo)	FW	4 June 2003 (aged 21)	CSMD Diables Noirs	2024	2026	29	18
19	Abdullahi Shuaibu	(Nigeria)	FW	22 January 2002 (aged 23)	Unattached	2024	2025 (+1)	29	8
20	Oche Ochowechi	(Nigeria)	FW	13 October 2001 (aged 23)	on loan from Kryvbas Kryvyi Rih	2024	2025	25	4
22	Farid Isgandarov	(Azerbaijan)	FW	16 March 2001 (aged 24)	Neftçi	2023		19	1
97	Elshad Taghiyev	(Azerbaijan)	FW	15 June 2001 (aged 23)	Shamakhi	2024	2025 (+1)	28	9
Out on loan
23	Mehrac Bakhshali	(Azerbaijan)	FW	11 June 2003 (aged 21)	Academy	2022		22	1
71	Senan Ağalarov	(Azerbaijan)	FW	12 May 2005 (aged 20)	Academy	2023		1	0
Left during the season
4	Vugar Hasanov	(Azerbaijan)	DF	5 December 1997 (aged 27)	Sabail	2024	2026	6	1
7	Laurent Mendy	(Senegal)	FW	18 December 1998 (aged 26)	Unattached	2024	2026	4	0
77	Okan Tahmazli	(Azerbaijan)	MF	3 February 2005 (aged 20)	Academy	2023		2	0
	Samuel Tetteh	(Ghana)	FW	28 July 1996 (aged 28)	Adanaspor	2023	2025	25	3

== Transfers ==
=== In ===
Date	Position	Nationality	Name	From	Fee	Ref.
14 August 2024	DF	(Azerbaijan)	Salman Alasgarov	Shamakhi	Undisclosed	
1 August 2024	GK	(Azerbaijan)	Səlahət Ağayev	Unattached	Free	
14 August 2024	DF	(Azerbaijan)	Elvin Yunuszade	Unattached	Free	
20 August 2024	FW	(Republic of the Congo)	Domi Massoumou	CSMD Diables Noirs	Undisclosed	
23 August 2024	FW	(Senegal)	Laurent Mendy	Unattached	Free	
4 September 2024	FW	(Azerbaijan)	Ruslan Voronsov	Jabrayil	Undisclosed	
5 September 2024	FW	(Azerbaijan)	Samir Hasanov	Neftçi	Undisclosed	
12 September 2024	FW	(Nigeria)	Abdullahi Shuaibu	Unattached	Free	
16 September 2024	FW	(Azerbaijan)	Elshad Taghiyev	Unattached	Free	

=== Loans in ===
Date from	Position	Nationality	Name	From	Date to	Ref.
16 September 2024	FW	(Nigeria)	Oche Ochowechi	Kryvbas Kryvyi Rih	29 May 2025	
11 February 2025	DF	(Azerbaijan)	Ibrahim Ramazanov	Turan Tovuz	29 May 2025	

=== Out ===
Date	Position	Nationality	Name	To	Fee	Ref.
30 June 2024	FW	(Azerbaijan)	Emil Safarov	Neftçi	Undisclosed	
22 July 2024	DF	(Azerbaijan)	Rufat Ahmadov	Turan Tovuz	Undisclosed	
31 July 2024	DF	(Azerbaijan)	Ibrahim Ramazanov	Turan Tovuz	Undisclosed	
1 September 2024	MF	(Azerbaijan)	Okan Tahmazli	Jabrayil	Undisclosed	

=== Loans out ===
Date from	Position	Nationality	Name	To	Date to	Ref.
17 September 2024	FW	(Azerbaijan)	Senan Ağalarov	Araz-Naxçıvan	End of season	
31 January 2025	FW	(Azerbaijan)	Mehrac Bakhshali	Mingəçevir	30 June 2026	

=== Released ===
Date	Position	Nationality	Name	Joined	Date	Ref
17 August 2024	GK	(Cameroon)	Christophe Atangana	Sporting Bruxelles		
30 August 2024	DF	(Ukraine)	Zurab Ochihava	Retired		
4 October 2024	FW	(Ghana)	Samuel Tetteh			
31 January 2025	DF	(Azerbaijan)	Vugar Hasanov	Mingəçevir		
31 January 2025	FW	(Senegal)	Laurent Mendy	Yenicami		
29 May 2025	GK	(Azerbaijan)	Mushfiq Nadirov	Shahdag Qusar	1 September 2025	
29 May 2025	DF	(Azerbaijan)	Samir Hasanov	Rubin-2 Kazan	24 July 2025	
29 May 2025	FW	(Azerbaijan)	Ruslan Voronsov	Shahdag Qusar	1 September 2025	

== Friendlies ==
2024	Gabala	2–2	Al-Yarmouk	Qabala
18:00 AZT (UTC+4)	Mendy; Luizinho	Report	Goal	Stadium: Gabala City Stadium

9 August 2024	Gabala	2–0	Zagatala	Qabala
18:00 AZT (UTC+4)	Shuaibu; Mendy	Report		Stadium: Gabala City Stadium

16 August 2024	Gabala	5–2	Jabrayil	Qabala
18:00 AZT (UTC+4)	Shuaibu; Yunuszade; Massoumou; Bakhshali	Report	Goal	Stadium: Gabala City Stadium

28 August 2024	Jabrayil	1–4	Gabala	Baku
18:00 AZT (UTC+4)	Goal	Report	Mammadov; Ismayilov; Massoumou; Agalarov	Stadium: Lökbatan Olympic Sport Complex Stadium

5 September 2024	Gabala	2–0	Imisli	Qabala
AZT (UTC+4)	Rashidov; Massoumou	Report		Stadium: Gabala City Stadium

19 January 2025	Gabala	4–0	Mingəçevir	Qabala
16:00 AZT (UTC+4)	Akorede; Musayev; Massoumou	Report		Stadium: Gabala City Stadium

23 January 2025	Qaradağ Lökbatan	0–2	Gabala	Baku
13:30 AZT (UTC+4)		Report	Taghiyev; Massoumou	Stadium: Bine Stadium

== Competitions ==
=== Overview ===
Competition	First match	Last match	Starting round	Final position	Record							
Competition	First match	Last match	Starting round	Final position	Pld	W	D	L	GF	GA	GD	Win %
First Division	13 September 2024	22 May 2025	Matchday 1	Winners	27	21	4	2	56	8	+48	77.78
Azerbaijan Cup	31 October 2024	4 December 2024	Second round	Last 16	2	1	0	1	4	2	+2	50.00
Total					29	22	4	3	60	10	+50	75.86

Last updated: 22 May 2025
Source: Competitions

=== First Division ===
Pos	Team	Pld	W	D	L	GF	GA	GD	Pts	Promotion, qualification or relegation
1	Qəbələ (C, P)	27	21	4	2	56	8	+48	67	Promotion to the Azerbaijan Premier League
2	İmişli (P)	27	15	7	5	43	20	+23	52	Promotion to the Azerbaijan Premier League
3	Karvan (P)	27	13	8	6	53	37	+16	47	Promotion to the Azerbaijan Premier League
4	Mingəçevir	27	9	8	10	30	36	−6	35	
5	Zaqatala	27	8	10	9	35	34	+1	34	

Source: Soccerway
(C) Champions; (P) Promoted

==== Results summary ====
Overall								Home						Away					
Pld	W	D	L	GF	GA	GD	Pts	W	D	L	GF	GA	GD	W	D	L	GF	GA	GD
27	21	4	2	56	8	+48	67	11	3	0	27	1	+26	10	1	2	29	7	+22

Last updated: 22 May 2025.
Source: See Results

==== Results by round ====
Round	1	2	3	4	5	6	7	8	9	10	11	12	13	14	15	16	17	18	19	20	21	22	23	24	25	26	27
Ground	H	A	H	A	H	H	H	A	H	H	A	H	A	A	A	H	A	A	H	A	H	A	H	A	H	H	A
Result	D	W	W	W	W	D	W	W	W	W	W	D	W	W	W	W	W	D	W	W	W	L	W	L	W	W	W
Position			2	2	2	2	2	1	1	1	1	1	1	1	1	1	1	1	1	1	1	1	1	1	1	1	1

Updated to match(es) played on 22 May 2025. Source: See Results
A = Away; H = Home; W = Win; D = Draw; L = Loss

==== Results ====
13 September 2024 1	Gabala	0–0	Zagatala	Qabala
17:00 AZT (UTC+4)	Ismayilov (yellow card) 16'	Report	Babazadeh (yellow card) 9'; Okezi (yellow card) 17'	Stadium: City Stadium; Attendance: 500; Referee: Vüqar Həsənli

19 September 2024 2	Qaradağ Lökbatan	0–5	Gabala	Baku
16:00 AZT (UTC+4)	Mutallimov (red card) 50'	Report	Massoumou 12', 38'; Nadirov 16' (o.g.); Ahmadov 47'; Shuaibu 51' (pen.); V.Hasanov (yellow card) 86'	Stadium: Lökbatan Olympic Sport Complex Stadium; Attendance: 150; Referee: Sabuhi Bayramov

26 September 2024 3	Gabala	2–0	Mingəçevir	Qabala
17:00 AZT (UTC+4)	Shahniyarov 26' (yellow card) 88'; Massoumou 30'; V.Hasanov (yellow card) 53'; Ahmadov (yellow card) 57'	Report	Bayramov (yellow card) 26'	Stadium: City Stadium; Attendance: 180; Referee: Ali Aliyev

4 October 2024 4	Baku Sporting	0–2	Gabala	Baku
15:00 AZT (UTC+4)	Aliyev (red card) 60'; Demirov (red card) 68'	Report	V.Hasanov 25'; Shuaibu 80'	Stadium: Baku Sporting Arena; Attendance: 150; Referee: Kamran Aliyev

19 October 2024 5	Gabala	1–0	Difai Ağsu	Qabala
17:00 AZT (UTC+4)	Yunuszade (yellow card) 49'; Shuaibu 67'	Report	Zeynalov (yellow card) 39'; Kamta (yellow card) 49'; Atakishiyev (yellow card) 90'	Stadium: City Stadium; Attendance: 200; Referee: Akbar Ahmadov

26 October 2024 6	Gabala	0–0	İmişli	Qabala
15:30 AZT (UTC+4)	Ismayilov (yellow card) 38'; Yunuszade (yellow card) 49'; Taghiyev (yellow card) 56'	Report	Qayaly (yellow card) 36'; Alves (yellow card) 37'; Faracov (yellow card) 49'; Agazada (yellow card) 52'; Rollo (yellow card) 88'	Stadium: City Stadium; Attendance: 350; Referee: Vugar Hasanli

7 November 2024 7	Gabala	3–0	MOIK Baku	Qabala
16:00 AZT (UTC+4)	Rashidov (yellow card) 20'; Damadayev (yellow card) 41'; Taghiyev 50', 76'; Shuaibu 64'	Report	Aliyev (yellow card) 23'; Hümbətov (red card) 87'	Stadium: City Stadium; Attendance: 150; Referee: Rövşən Rəcəbov

28 November 2024 8	Karvan	0–1	Gabala	Yevlakh
14:30 AZT (UTC+4)	Teymurov (yellow card) 36'; Mohammadalipur (yellow card) 45+2'; Gadirzadeh (yellow card) 90+1'	Report	Ismayilov (yellow card) 59'; Rashidov 88'	Stadium: Yevlakh City Stadium; Attendance: 3,000; Referee: Tural Gurbanov

13 December 2024 9	Gabala	2–0	Jabrayil	Qabala
15:00 AZT (UTC+4)	Alasgarov 21'; Ochowechi 23'; Yunuszade (yellow card) 64'; Aliyev (yellow card) 75'; Shahniyarov (yellow card) 79'	Report	Tahmazli (yellow card) 28'; Abdurahmanov (yellow card) 57' (yellow-red card) 76'	Stadium: City Stadium; Attendance: 250; Referee: Rəvan Həmzəzadə

19 December 2024 10	Gabala	3–0	Qaradağ Lökbatan	Qabala
15:00 AZT (UTC+4)	Voronsov 34'; Ochowechi 56'; Ismayilov (yellow card) 58'; Yunuszade (yellow card) 81'; Taghiyev 85'	Report	Hüseynov (yellow card) 47' (yellow-red card) 65'	Stadium: City Stadium; Attendance: 150; Referee: Ruslan Quliyev

24 December 2024 11	Mingəçevir	0–2	Gabala	Mingachevir
14:00 AZT (UTC+4)	Ahmadov (yellow card) 18'; Nasibov (yellow card) 54' (yellow-red card) 90'; Mammadzadeh (yellow card) 55'; E.Aliyev (yellow card) 69' (yellow-red card) 89'; Mirzayev (yellow card) 86'	Report	Massoumou 8'; Shahniyarov (yellow card) 13' (goal) 46'	Stadium: Yashar Mammadzade Stadium; Attendance: 200; Referee: Əli Əliyev

30 January 2025 12	Gabala	0–0	Baku Sporting	Qabala
15:00 AZT (UTC+4)		Report	Stevanovic (yellow card) 8'; Əskərli (yellow card) 12'	Stadium: City Stadium; Attendance: 300; Referee: Namiq Bəkirov

6 February 2025 13	Difai Ağsu	0–1	Gabala	Agsu
14:30 AZT (UTC+4)	Kərimzadə (yellow card) 90+2'	Report	Musayev 64'	Stadium: City Stadium; Attendance: 40; Referee: Şamil İmanzadə

13 February 2025 14	İmişli	1–2	Gabala	Imishli
14:00 AZT (UTC+4)	Jafarli (yellow card) 51'; Bashirov (yellow card) 58'; Pablo 72'	Report	Musayev (yellow card) 21'; Süleymanov (yellow card) 48'; Shahniyarov 58'; Massoumou 82'; Ağayev (yellow card) 90+5'	Stadium: Heydar Aliyev Stadium; Attendance: 1,500; Referee: Nicat İsmayıllı

19 February 2025 15	MOIK Baku	0–4	Gabala	Baku
14:00 AZT (UTC+4)	Ələkbərli (yellow card) 23'	Report	Taghiyev 20'; Shahniyarov (yellow card) 59'; Ochowechi 59', 76'; Massoumou 74'	Stadium: Bine Stadium; Attendance: 70; Referee: Səbuhi Bayramov

28 February 2025 16	Gabala	2–0	Karvan	Qabala
15:00 AZT (UTC+4)	Massoumou 54' (yellow card) 88'; Ismayilov (yellow card) 69'; Rashidov (yellow card) 88'	Report	Qədirzadə (yellow card) 42'; Qasımov (yellow card) 45'; Abdullayev (yellow card) 76'	Stadium: City Stadium; Attendance: 200; Referee: Fərid Hacıyev

7 March 2025 17	Jabrayil	2–3	Gabala	Baku
13:00 AZT (UTC+4)	Maharramli 16'; Yaqubov (yellow card) 35'; Ahmadov 90+4' (pen.)	Report	Shuaibu 23'; Isgandarov (yellow card) 73'; Massoumou 75', 90+1' (yellow card) 85'; Mammadov (yellow card) 85'	Stadium: Bayil Arena; Attendance: 30; Referee: Kamran Əliyev

13 March 2025 18	Zagatala	1–1	Gabala	Zaqatala
15:00 AZT (UTC+4)	Abazərov (yellow card) 11'; Babazadə (yellow card) 17'; Assoumou 55'	Report	Musayev 16'	Stadium: City Stadium; Attendance: 1,000; Referee: Nicat İsmayıllı

28 March 2025 19	Gabala	2–0	Mingəçevir	Qabala
16:00 AZT (UTC+4)	Rashidov (yellow card) 22'; Massoumou 33'; Musayev 42'	Report	Fərmanov (yellow card) 81'	Stadium: City Stadium; Attendance: 700; Referee: Murad Səlimov

4 April 2025 20	Baku Sporting	0–5	Gabala	Baku
16:00 AZT (UTC+4)	Hafizli (yellow card) 51'; Mahmudov (yellow card) 77'	Report	Aliyev 20', 89'; Massoumou 43'; Taghiyev 79', 86'	Stadium: Bine Stadium; Attendance: 300; Referee: Əli Əliyev

11 April 2025 21	Gabala	4–0	Difai Ağsu	Qabala
17:00 AZT (UTC+4)	Massoumou 7'; Taghiyev 16'; Aliyev 18', 57'; Yunuszade (yellow card) 22'; Hasanov (yellow card) 75'	Report	Əliyev (yellow card) 49'; Bədirov (yellow card) 56'; Zeynalov (yellow card) 58'; Həsənov (yellow card) 65'; Kərimzadə (yellow card) 86'	Stadium: City Stadium; Attendance: 200; Referee: Rövşən Rəcəbov

18 April 2025 22	İmişli	1–0	Gabala	Imishli
16:30 AZT (UTC+4)	Rəhimzadə 7' (pen.) (yellow card) 43'; Aghazade (yellow card) 32'; Tahirov (yellow card) 33'; Tomarov (yellow card) 58'; Vasques (yellow card) 71'	Report	Shahniyarov (yellow card) 19'; Voronsov (yellow card) 19'; Suleymanov (yellow card) 19'	Stadium: Heydar Aliyev Stadium; Attendance: 2,500; Referee: Elvin Bayramov

25 April 2025 23	Gabala	1–0	MOIK Baku	Qabala
18:00 AZT (UTC+4)	Damadayev (yellow card) 86'; Voronsov (yellow card) 90+5'; Taghiyev 90+7'; Hasanov (yellow card) 90+7'	Report	Bayramov (yellow card) 87'; Allahquliyev (yellow card) 90+5'; Tamazov (yellow card) 90+5'; Qurbanlı (yellow card) 90+5'	Stadium: City Stadium; Attendance: 500; Referee: Vüqar Həsənli

2 May 2025 24	Karvan	2–0	Gabala	Yevlakh
17:00 AZT (UTC+4)	Qasımov 62'; Morgan 80'; Teymurov (yellow card) 85'; İbrahimov (yellow card) 90+3'; Teymurov (yellow card) 90+3'	Report	Ismayilov (yellow card) 50'; Rashidov (yellow card) 90+3'	Stadium: Yevlakh City Stadium; Attendance: 3,000; Referee: Kamran Əliyev

8 May 2025 25	Gabala	3–1	Jabrayil	Qabala
17:00 AZT (UTC+4)	Ibrahimov 38' (o.g.); Ismayilov 61'; Massoumou 80'	Report	Qarayev 78'	Stadium: City Stadium; Attendance: 150; Referee: Rəvan Həmzəzadə

15 May 2025 26	Gabala	4–0	Zagatala	Qabala
16:00 AZT (UTC+4)	Massoumou 29', 54'; Shahniyarov (yellow card) 35'; Shuaibu 39'; Yunuszade (yellow card) 47'; Voronsov (yellow card) 59'; Taghiyev 80'	Report	İsmayılov (yellow card) 59'; Abdullayev (yellow card) 81'	Stadium: City Stadium; Attendance: 350; Referee: Emin Əliyev

22 May 2025 27	Qaradağ Lökbatan	0–3	Gabala	Baku
17:00 AZT (UTC+4)	Novruzov (yellow card) 67'; Mahmudov (yellow card) 77'	Report	Shuaibu 63'; Alasgarov 84'; Massoumou 87' (pen.)	Stadium: Lökbatan Olympic Sport Complex Stadium; Attendance: 70; Referee: Kamran Əliyev

=== Azerbaijan Cup ===
31 October 2024 Second round	Gabala	4–0	Baku Sporting	Qabala
15:00 AZT (UTC+4)	Massoumou 5' (pen.), 43'; Voronsov 20'; Isgandarov (yellow card) 61' (goal) 75'; Musayev (yellow card) 89'	Report	Demirov (yellow card) 24'	Stadium: City Stadium; Attendance: 300; Referee: Nicat İsmayıllı

4 December 2024 Last 16	Gabala	0–2	Qarabağ	Qabala
16:00 AZT (UTC+4)	Alasgarov (yellow card) 44'	Report	Zoubir 7'; Vešović (yellow card) 34'; Musayev 90+1' (o.g.)	Stadium: City Stadium; Attendance: 800; Referee: Rauf Jabarov

== Squad statistics ==
As of match played 22 May 2025

=== Appearances and goals ===
No.	Pos	Nat	Player	Total		First Division		Azerbaijan Cup	
No.	Pos	Nat	Player	Apps	Goals	Apps	Goals	Apps	Goals
1	GK	(Azerbaijan) AZE	Səlahət Ağayev	26	0	24	0	2	0
5	DF	(Azerbaijan) AZE	Samir Hasanov	17	0	14+2	0	1	0
6	MF	(Azerbaijan) AZE	Emil Süleymanov	26	0	5+19	0	1+1	0
8	MF	(Azerbaijan) AZE	Urfan Ismayilov	27	1	25	1	1+1	0
9	FW	(Azerbaijan) AZE	Ruslan Voronsov	18	2	9+8	1	1	1
10	MF	(Azerbaijan) AZE	Shahin Shahniyarov	28	3	23+3	3	1+1	0
11	MF	(Azerbaijan) AZE	Asif Mammadov	11	0	0+11	0	0	0
13	DF	(Azerbaijan) AZE	Nicat Aliyev	28	4	27	4	0+1	0
14	FW	(Republic of the Congo) CGO	Domi Massoumou	29	18	21+6	16	2	2
19	FW	(Nigeria) NGA	Abdullahi Shuaibu	29	8	16+11	8	1+1	0
20	FW	(Nigeria) NGA	Oche Ochowechi	25	4	17+6	4	1+1	0
21	MF	(Azerbaijan) AZE	Ziya Shakarkhanov	6	0	0+6	0	0	0
22	FW	(Azerbaijan) AZE	Farid Isgandarov	19	1	3+14	0	1+1	1
25	DF	(Azerbaijan) AZE	Ibrahim Ramazanov	5	0	0+5	0	0	0
26	DF	(Azerbaijan) AZE	Elnur Mustafayev	3	0	1+1	0	1	0
27	MF	(Azerbaijan) AZE	Eshqin Ahmadov	6	1	5+1	1	0	0
28	DF	(Azerbaijan) AZE	Murad Musayev	20	3	15+3	3	2	0
32	DF	(Azerbaijan) AZE	Elvin Yunuszade	22	0	18+3	0	1	0
44	DF	(Azerbaijan) AZE	Salman Alasgarov	9	2	4+3	2	2	0
66	DF	(Azerbaijan) AZE	Nuqay Rashidov	25	1	19+4	1	2	0
74	DF	(Azerbaijan) AZE	Suleyman Damadayev	28	0	25+2	0	1	0
94	GK	(Azerbaijan) AZE	Habib Hasanov	3	0	3	0	0	0
97	FW	(Azerbaijan) AZE	Elshad Taghiyev	28	9	15+11	9	1+1	0
Players away on loan:
23	FW	(Azerbaijan) AZE	Mehrac Bakhshali	3	0	2+1	0	0	0
Players who left Gabala during the season:
4	DF	(Azerbaijan) AZE	Vugar Hasanov	6	1	5+1	1	0	0
7	FW	(Senegal) SEN	Laurent Mendy	4	0	0+3	0	0+1	0

=== Goal scorers ===
Place	Position	Nation	Number	Name	First Division	Azerbaijan Cup	Total
1	FW	(Republic of the Congo)	14	Domi Massoumou	16	2	18
2	FW	(Azerbaijan)	97	Elshad Taghiyev	9	0	9
3	FW	(Nigeria)	19	Abdullahi Shuaibu	8	0	8
4	FW	(Nigeria)	20	Oche Ochowechi	4	0	4
4	DF	(Azerbaijan)	13	Nicat Aliyev	4	0	4
6	MF	(Azerbaijan)	10	Shahin Shahniyarov	3	0	3
6	DF	(Azerbaijan)	28	Murad Musayev	3	0	3
8	DF	(Azerbaijan)	44	Salman Alasgarov	2	0	2
8	FW	(Azerbaijan)	9	Ruslan Voronsov	1	1	2
8				Own goal	2	0	2
11	DF	(Azerbaijan)	27	Eshqin Ahmadov	1	0	1
11	DF	(Azerbaijan)	4	Vugar Hasanov	1	0	1
11	DF	(Azerbaijan)	66	Nuqay Rashidov	1	0	1
11	MF	(Azerbaijan)	8	Urfan Ismayilov	1	0	1
11	FW	(Azerbaijan)	22	Farid Isgandarov	0	1	1
				TOTALS	56	4	60

=== Clean sheets ===
Place	Position	Nation	Number	Name	First Division	Azerbaijan Cup	Total
1	GK	(Azerbaijan)	1	Səlahət Ağayev	20	1	21
2	GK	(Azerbaijan)	94	Habib Hasanov	1	0	1
				TOTALS	21	1	22

=== Disciplinary record ===
Number	Nation	Position	Name	First Division		Azerbaijan Cup		Total	
Number	Nation	Position	Name	Booked	Sent off (straight red)	Booked	Sent off (straight red)	Booked	Sent off (straight red)
1	(Azerbaijan)	GK	Səlahət Ağayev	1	0	0	0	1	0
5	(Azerbaijan)	DF	Samir Hasanov	1	0	0	0	1	0
6	(Azerbaijan)	MF	Emil Suleymanov	2	0	0	0	2	0
8	(Azerbaijan)	MF	Urfan Ismayilov	6	0	0	0	6	0
9	(Azerbaijan)	FW	Ruslan Voronsov	3	0	0	0	3	0
10	(Azerbaijan)	MF	Shahin Shahniyarov	6	0	0	0	6	0
11	(Azerbaijan)	MF	Asif Mammadov	1	0	0	0	1	0
13	(Azerbaijan)	DF	Nicat Aliyev	1	0	0	0	1	0
14	(Republic of the Congo)	FW	Domi Massoumou	2	0	0	0	2	0
22	(Azerbaijan)	FW	Farid Isgandarov	1	0	1	0	2	0
27	(Azerbaijan)	DF	Eshqin Ahmadov	1	0	0	0	1	0
28	(Azerbaijan)	DF	Murad Musayev	1	0	1	0	2	0
32	(Azerbaijan)	DF	Elvin Yunuszade	6	0	0	0	6	0
44	(Azerbaijan)	DF	Salman Alasgarov	1	0	0	0	1	0
66	(Azerbaijan)	MF	Nuqay Rashidov	4	0	0	0	4	0
74	(Azerbaijan)	DF	Suleyman Damadayev	2	0	0	0	2	0
94	(Azerbaijan)	GK	Habib Hasanov	1	0	0	0	1	0
97	(Azerbaijan)	FW	Elshad Taghiyev	1	0	0	0	1	0
Players away on loan:
Players who left Gabala during the season:
4	(Azerbaijan)	DF	Vugar Hasanov	2	0	0	0	2	0
			TOTALS	42	0	3	0	45	0
