= 2024–25 Azerbaijan First Division =

Azerbaijan First Division
- Season: 2024–25
- Champions: Gabala (2nd title)
- Promoted: Gabala; İmişli; Karvan
- Relegated: Qaradağ Lökbatan
- Matches: 135
- Goals: 356 (2.64 per match)
- Biggest home win: Karvan 5–0 Mingəçevir (19 December 2024); Zaqatala 6–1 Baku Sportinq (10 April 2025)
- Biggest away win: Qaradağ Lökbatan 0–5 Qəbələ (19 September 2024); Baku Sportinq 0–5 Qəbələ (4 April 2025)
- Highest scoring: Difai Ağsu 3–5 Karvan (3 April 2025)
- Longest winning run: Karvan (6)
- Longest unbeaten run: Gabala (21)
- Highest attendance: 3,000
- Total attendance: 64,595
- Average attendance: 478

The 2024–25 Azerbaijan First Division was the second-level of football in Azerbaijan.

In the 20th round of the First League on 7 April 2025, Gabala won 5–0 against Baku Sporting, securing promotion to the Premier League with 7 matchdays (35 games) remaining before the end of the tournament.

== Teams ==
A total of 10 teams would compete, with the winners promoted to Azerbaijan Premier League and the team whom finished last relegated to the Azerbaijan Second League.

Team	Location	Venue	Capacity
Baku Sporting	Baku	Bine Stadium	600
Cəbrayıl	Jabrayil	Neftchi Football Center Stadium	200
Difai Ağsu	Agsu	Agsu City Stadium	3,000
Karvan	Yevlakh	Yevlakh City Stadium	5,000
Mingəçevir	Mingachevir	Yashar Mammadzade Stadium	5,000
MOİK	Baku	Bine Stadium	600
Qaradağ Lökbatan	Baku	Lökbatan Olympic Sport Complex Stadium	2,500
Qəbələ	Qabala	Gabala City Stadium	4,500
İmişli	Imishli	Heydar Aliyev Stadium	8,500
Zaqatala	Zaqatala	Zaqatala City Stadium	3,500

== League table ==
Pos	Team	Pld	W	D	L	GF	GA	GD	Pts	Promotion, qualification or relegation
1	Qəbələ (C, P)	27	21	4	2	56	8	+48	67	Promotion to the Azerbaijan Premier League
2	İmişli (P)	27	15	7	5	43	20	+23	52	Promotion to the Azerbaijan Premier League
3	Karvan (P)	27	13	8	6	53	37	+16	47	Promotion to the Azerbaijan Premier League
4	Mingəçevir	27	9	8	10	30	36	−6	35	
5	Zaqatala	27	8	10	9	35	34	+1	34	
6	MOİK	27	8	6	13	29	43	−14	30	
7	Cəbrayıl	27	8	5	14	26	34	−8	29	
8	Baku Sporting	27	7	7	13	21	43	−22	28	
9	Difai Ağsu (O)	27	7	5	15	36	54	−18	26	Qualification to the Azerbaijan First Division play-off
10	Qaradağ Lökbatan (R)	27	5	8	14	27	47	−20	23	Relegation to the Azerbaijan Second Division

Source: Soccerway
(C) Champions; (O) Play-off winners; (P) Promoted; (R) Relegated

== Results ==
Clubs play each other three times for a total of 27 matches each.

Home \ Away	BAK	CƏB	DIF	KAR	MIN	MOİ	QAR	QƏB	ZAQ	İMI	BAK	CƏB	DIF	KAR	MIN	MOİ	QAR	QƏB	ZAQ	İMI
Baku Sporting	—	1–0	0–2	0–2	0–1	0–0	3–2	0–2	0–0	2–2	—	—	1–2	—	—	0–0	0–1	0–5	—	—
Cəbrayıl	1–2	—	0–4	1–1	3–0	0–1	3–0	2–3	0–0	0–2	2–1	—	—	—	2–0	—	3–0	—	1–0	—
Difai Ağsu	0–1	0–1	—	1–4	3–3	0–1	2–1	0–1	3–1	0–4	—	1–1	—	3–5	1–4	—	—	—	1–0	1–3
Karvan	3–1	1–2	3–3	—	5–0	3–1	1–0	0–1	3–2	3–2	1–1	2–0	—	—	—	—	2–2	2–0	—	1–1
Mingəçevir	1–2	0–0	1–0	1–3	—	1–0	1–1	0–2	2–3	0–0	4–0	—	—	2–1	—	—	—	—	2–2	0–0
MOİK	1–0	2–1	2–2	2–3	1–2	—	2–2	0–4	3–1	4–3	—	2–1	1–3	1–1	1–3	—	—	—	0–0	—
Qaradağ Lökbatan	2–3	2–0	4–2	1–1	0–0	3–0	—	0–5	1–1	0–1	—	—	3–1	—	0–0	0–1	—	0–3	—	—
Qəbələ	0–0	2–0	1–0	2–0	2–0	3–0	3–0	—	0–0	0–0	—	3–1	4–0	—	2–0	1–0	—	—	4–0	—
Zaqatala	2–0	2–1	1–1	2–2	2–1	1–0	4–0	1–1	—	1–4	6–1	—	—	3–0	—	—	0–0	—	—	0–2
İmişli	1–2	0–0	1–0	2–0	0–1	3–0	2–1	1–2	1–0	—	0–0	2–0	—	—	—	2–1	3–1	1–0	—	—

Source: Soccerway
Legend: Blue = home team win; Yellow = draw; Red = away team win.

== Azerbaijan First Division play-off ==
The ninth-placed team (Difai Ağsu) faced the fourth-placed team of the 2024–25 Azerbaijan Second Division (Hypers Guba) for the final place in the 2025–26 Azerbaijan First Division.

28 May 2025
16:00

Hypers Guba	1–3	Difai Ağsu

== Season statistics ==
=== Top scorers ===
Rank	Player	Club	Goals
1	(Republic of the Congo) Domi Massoumou	Gabala	16
2	(Azerbaijan) Emil Qasımov	Karvan	15
3	(Azerbaijan) Bahruz Teymurov	Karvan	13
4	(Azerbaijan) Seyxan Fərəcov	İmişli	11
4	(Azerbaijan) İbrahim Əliyev	MOIK Baku	11
5	(Ghana) Ezekiel Morgan	Karvan	10
6	(Azerbaijan) Roini Ismayilov	Zagatala	9
6	(Azerbaijan) Elshad Taghiyev	Gabala	9
6	(Nigeria) Abdullahi Shuaybu	Gabala	9
7	(Cameroon) Christian Kamta	Difai Ağsu	8
7	(Gabon) Jean-Paul Assoumou	Zagatala	8
8	(Brazil) Pablo Henrique	İmişli	7
8	(Nigeria) Muhammad Benjamin	Difai Ağsu	7
8	(Azerbaijan) Nahid Aliyev	Mingəçevir	7
9	(Azerbaijan) Araz Abdullayev	Qaradağ Lökbatan	6
9	(Azerbaijan) Jalal Jabrayilov	Zagatala	6

=== Spectators ===
In the 2024/25 season, a total of 64,595 spectators watched the First League games. Across 135 matches played, the average attendance was 478 spectators per game. The highest attendance figures were recorded for the team Karvan FK, whose matches were watched by a total of 1,950 spectators. The season's attendance record was 3,000 spectators, set during the 8th and 24th rounds in the matches between Karvan FK and Gabala SC.
