= 2026–27 Azerbaijan Premier League =

Azerbaijan Premier League
- Season: 2026–27
- Dates: 14 August 2026 – 24 May 2027
- Matches: 28
- Goals: 71 (2.54 per match)
- Top goalscorer: Breno Almeida (6)
- All statistics correct as of 14 September 2026.

The 2026–27 Azerbaijan Premier League will be the 35th season of the Azerbaijan Premier League, the highest tier football league of Azerbaijan. The season will start on 14 August 2026 and end on 24 May 2027.

Sabah will enter the season as the defending champions.

== Teams ==
Twelve teams will compete in the league – the top eleven teams from the previous season and one team promoted from the Azerbaijan First League.

Locations of the 2026–27 Azerbaijan Premier League teams

=== Stadia and locations ===
Note: Table lists in alphabetical order.

Team	Year Established	Location	Venue	Capacity
Araz Naxçıvan	1967	Nakhchivan, Baku	Dalga Arena	6,502
Imishli	2022	Imishli	Heydar Aliyev Stadium	8,500
Kapaz	1959	Ganja	Ganja City Stadium	15,343
Neftchi	1937	Baku	Neftchi Arena	10,289
Qabala	2005	Qabala	Gabala City Stadium	3,748
Qarabağ	1987	Aghdam, Baku	Tofiq Bahramov Stadium	31,200
Sabah	2017	Absheron	Bank Respublika Arena	8,969
Shafa	1998	Baku	TBD	TBD
Shamakhi	1997	Shamakhi	Shamakhi City Stadium	2,176
Sumgayit	2010	Sumgait	Mehdi Huseynzade Stadium	9,502
Turan Tovuz	2014	Tovuz	Tovuz City Stadium	6,500
Zira	2014	Zira, Baku	Zira Sport Complex	1,256

=== Managerial changes ===
Team	Outgoing manager	Manner of departure	Announced On	Departed On	Position In Table	Incoming Manager	Announced on	Arrived on	Ref.
Shamakhi	(Azerbaijan) Aykhan Abbasov	Resigned	23 May 2026	23 May 2026	Pre-season	(Azerbaijan national football team) Azer Baghirov	2 June 2026	2 June 2026	
Sumgayit	(Serbia) Saša Ilić	End of contract	26 May 2026	26 May 2026	Pre-season	(Portugal) Filipe Cândido	9 July 2026	9 July 2026	
Shafa	(Azerbaijan) Elgiz Karamli	Mutual consent	26 May 2026	26 May 2026	Pre-season	(Azerbaijan) Zaur Hashimov	27 June 2026	27 June 2026	
Araz-Naxçıvan	(Ukraine national football team) Andriy Demchenko	End of contract	26 May 2026	26 May 2026	Pre-season	(Azerbaijan national football team) Javid Huseynov	16 June 2026	16 June 2026	
Kapaz	(Azerbaijan national football team) Azer Baghirov	Mutual Termination	29 May 2026	29 May 2026	Pre-season	(Azerbaijan) Azer Mammadov	23 June 2026		
Qabala	(Georgia national football team) Kakhaber Tskhadadze	Mutual Termination	31 August 2026	31 August 2026	10th	(North Macedonia national football team) Jeton Beqiri	16 September 2026	16 September 2026	

== League table ==
Pos	Team	Pld	W	D	L	GF	GA	GD	Pts	Qualification or relegation
1	Neftçi	12	8	3	1	29	12	+17	27	Qualification for the Champions League first qualifying round
2	Sabah	11	7	3	1	27	7	+20	24	Qualification for the Conference League second qualifying round (Note: The 2026–27 Azerbaijan Cup winner will qualify for the Europa League first qualifying round. If the cup winner finishes in the top three, the second Conference League berth will be passed to the fourth place team.)
3	Turan Tovuz	12	7	3	2	14	8	+6	24	Qualification for the Conference League second qualifying round
4	Qarabağ	11	5	5	1	14	8	+6	20	
5	Zira	12	5	5	2	18	17	+1	20	
6	Kapaz	11	5	3	3	10	10	0	18	
7	Shamakhi	12	3	5	4	17	18	−1	14	
8	Imishli	12	3	3	6	11	17	−6	12	
9	Qabala	12	3	2	7	8	18	−10	11	
10	Sumgayit	11	2	4	5	14	19	−5	10	
11	Shafa	12	1	2	9	8	22	−14	5	Qualification to Relegation Play-off
12	Araz-Nax	12	0	4	8	12	26	−14	4	Relegation to Azerbaijan First Division

Updated to match(es) played on 22 November 2026. Source: Soccerway
Rules for classification: 1) Points; 2) Matches won; 3) Goal difference; 4) Goals scored; 5) Head-to-head points; 6) Head-to-head goal difference; 7) Lower number of points based on yellow and red cards; 8) Draw.

== Results ==
Home \ Away	ARA	GAB	IMI	KAP	NEF	QAR	SAB	SHF	SHA	SUM	TUR	ZIR	ARA	GAB	IMI	KAP	NEF	QAR	SAB	SHF	SHA	SUM	TUR	ZIR
Araz-Nax	—	1–2	0–0	0–2	1–3		0–1				2–2	2–2	—											
Qabala		—	2–1		0–3	0–0	0–4	0–1	0–0					—										
Imishli			—		2–3	0–2			2–1	0–0	1–0	2–2			—									
Kapaz		1–0	1–0	—		0–0			1–4	1–1	1–0	1–1				—								
Neftçi	5–0			1–0	—		0–0	4–1			1–1						—							
Qarabağ	3–2			17/12	3–3	—		1–0	3–1		0–1							—						
Sabah			3–1	2–0		0–0	—		2–2	17/12		5–0							—					
Shafa	2–2	0–2	0–1	1–2			0–3	—			0–1									—				
Shamakhi	2–1				2–3			3–2	—		0–2										—			
Sumgayit	2–1	4–1			1–3	0–1	1–5	1–1	1–1	—												—		
Turan Tovuz		1–0					3–2		0–0	2–1	—	1–0											—	
Zira		2–1	3–1		1–0	1–1		2–0	1–1	3–2		—												—

Updated to match(es) played on 22 November 2026. Source: Soccerway
Legend: Blue = home team win; Yellow = draw; Red = away team win.
For upcoming matches, an "a" indicates there is an article about the rivalry between the two participants.

=== Match results by week ===
Team ╲ Round	1	2	3	4	5	6	7	8	9	10	11	12	13	14	15	16	17	18	19	20	21	22
Araz N.	D	L	L	L	D	L	L	L	L													
Imishli	D	L	W	L	L	L	L	W	W													
Kapaz	L	-	W	L	W	D	W	D	W													
Neftchi	W	W	L	W	W	W	D	D	D													
Qabala	L	L	D	W	L	L	L	L	W													
Qarabağ	W	-	W	W	D	W	W	D	D													
Sabah	W	-	W	W	W	W	D	W	D													
Shafa	L	W	L	L	L	L	L	L	L													
Shamakhi	L	D	D	W	D	W	D	W	L													
Sumgayit	L	-	L	L	D	D	W	W	L													
Turan	W	D	L	W	D	W	W	L	D													
Zira	W	W	W	L	D	L	D	D	W													

Updated to match(es) played on 13 September 2026. Source:
W = Win; D = Draw; L = Loss

=== Position by round ===
Number = One less match played per underline.
Positions are shown as of the end of the round.

Team ╲ Round	1	2	3	4	5	6	7	8	9	10	11	12	13	14	15	16	17	18	19	20	21	22
Sabah	3	5	4	2	1	2	2	1	1													
Neftchi	1	1	2	1	2	1	1	2	2													
Qarabağ	2	4	3	3	3	3	3	3	3													
Turan	5	3	5	5	5	5	4	4	4													
Zira	4	2	1	4	4	4	5	6	5													
Kapaz	12	12	7	9	7	7	7	7	6													
Shamakhi	9	8	10	6	7	6	6	5	7													
Imishli	7	7	6	8	9	8	10	9	8													
Sumgayit	10	11	12	12	12	11	8	8	9													
Qabala	8	10	9	7	8	9	9	10	10													
Shafa	11	6	8	10	10	10	11	11	11													
Araz N.	6	9	11	11	11	12	12	12	12													

League leaders/Champions of 2026–27 Azerbaijan Premier League/Qualification for the Champions League 1QR
Qualification for Conference League 2QR
Qualification for the Relegation play-offs
Relegation to Azerbaijan First League

== Season statistics ==
=== Top scorers ===
As of match played 11 October 2026

Rank	Player	Club	Goals
1	(Brazilian Football Confederation) Breno Almeida	Neftçi	7
2	(Rwanda Football Federation) Joy-Lance Mickels	Sabah	4
3	(Association of Football Federations of Azerbaijan) Agadadash Salyanski	Araz-Naxçıvan	3
3	(Ukrainian Association of Football) Oleksiy Kashchuk	Qarabağ	3
5	(Turkish Football Federation) Eren Aydın	Zira	2
5	(Association of Football Federations of Azerbaijan) Edqar Adilkhanov	Şamaxı	2
5	(Jamaica Football Federation) Renaldo Cephas	Qarabağ	2
5	(Nigerien Football Federation) Issa Djibrilla	Zira	2
5	(Portuguese Football Federation) Diogo Almeida	İmişli	2
5	(Brazilian Football Confederation) Jô	Turan Tovuz	2
5	(Gabonese Football Federation) Orphé Mbina	Sabah	2
5	(Football Association of Serbia) Veljko Simić	Sabah	2
5	(Hungarian Football Federation) Alen Skribek	Neftçi	2
5	(Moldovan Football Federation) Victor Stînă	Kapaz	2
5	(Slovak Football Association) Ľubomír Tupta	Neftçi	2
5	(Portuguese Football Federation) Ricardo Apolinário	Şamaxı	2
5	(Burkinabé Football Federation) Mamady Bangré	Sumgayit	2
5	(French Football Federation) Jaly Mouaddib	Qarabağ	2
5	(Dominican Football Federation) Ronaldo Vásquez	Sumgayit	2

=== Clean sheets ===
As of match played 11 October 2026

Rank	Player	Club	Clean sheets
1	(Portuguese Football Federation) Rogerio	Kapaz	3
1	(Association of Football Federations of Azerbaijan) Emil Balayev	Neftçi	3
1	(Kazakhstan Football Federation) Stas Pokatilov	Sabah	3
4	(Russian Football Union) Aleksei Kenyaykin	Turan Tovuz	2
4	(Portuguese Football Federation) Ricardo Fernandes	Şamaxı	2
4	(Association of Football Federations of Azerbaijan) Aydın Bayramov	Zira	2
4	(Association of Football Federations of Azerbaijan) Ravan Mirzammadov	Sabah	2
4	(Football Association of Bosnia and Herzegovina) Martin Zlomislić	Qarabağ	2
4	(Tajikistan Football Federation) Oleg Baklov	Turan Tovuz	2
10	(Brazilian Football Confederation) Arthur	Araz-Naxçıvan	1
10	(Association of Football Federations of Azerbaijan) Yusif İmanov	İmişli	1
10	(Association of Football Federations of Azerbaijan) Nicat Mehbalıyev	Shafa Baku	1
10	(Association of Football Federations of Azerbaijan) Səlahət Ağayev	Qabala	1
10	(Association of Football Federations of Azerbaijan) Yusif İmanov	İmişli	1
10	(Polish Football Association) Mateusz Kochalski	Qarabağ	1
