= Maharramli (surname) =

Maharramli is a surname. Notable people with the surname include:

- Rafael Maharramli (born 1999), Azerbaijani footballer
- Samir Maharramli (born 2002), Azerbaijani footballer
