= Samir Maharramli =

Azerbaijani footballer (born 2002)

Personal information
- Full name: Samir Azer oglu Maharramli
- Date of birth: 17 July 2002 (age 24)
- Place of birth: Azerbaijan
- Height: 1.78 m (5 ft 10 in)
- Position: Midfielder

Team information
- Current team: Jabrayil
- Number: 11

Youth career
- Gabala

Senior career*
Years	Team	Apps	(Gls)
2020–2023	Sabah	0	(0)
2022–2023	→ Kapaz (loan)	9	(0)
2023–2024	Shamakhi		
2024–	Jabrayil		

International career
2020–	Azerbaijan U-21	5	(0)
Medal record
Men's football
Representing Azerbaijan
Islamic Solidarity Games
Bronze medal – third place	2021 Konya
- * Club domestic league appearances and goals as of 16:25, 5 October 2024 (UTC)

Samir Azer oglu Maharramli (Azerbaijani: Samir Azər oğlu Məhərrəmli; born 17 July 2002) is an Azerbaijani footballer who plays as a midfielder for Jabrayil FK in the Azerbaijan Second League.

== Club career ==
On 21 August 2022, Maharramli made his debut in the Azerbaijan Premier League for Kapaz against Gabala.
