= MKT Araz FK =

FK Mil-Muğan
- Full name: Mil-Muğan FK
- Nickname: Pambıqçılar (The Cottongrowers)
- Founded: 2004; 22 years ago as MKT-Araz
- Dissolved: 2018; 8 years ago
- Ground: Heydar Aliyev – MKT Araz Stadium, Imishli, Azerbaijan
- Capacity: 8,500
- Chairman: Mirheydar Safiyev
- Manager: Khalig Mustafayev
- League: Azerbaijan First Division
- 2017–18: 8th
Home colours	Away colours

Mil-Muğan FK was an Azerbaijani football club based in Imishli. The club was founded in 2004 by МКТ Istehsalat-Kommersiya, a cotton manufacturing company.

== History ==
The club was immediately admitted to the AFFA Supreme League after its formation. They finished 8th in 2004/05 and 9th in 2005/06. In 2006 the club also played in the UEFA Intertoto Cup due to the rejection of several Azerbaijan clubs in this competition. Although it was successful in winning the home game against Moldovan Tiraspol in the first stage (1:0), the club lost in Moldova (1:2) and thus, was out of the tournament.

The 2006/07 became the most successful season in club history. The team took 5th place and reached the Azerbaijan Cup final, losing 1:0 to FK Khazar Lankaran. Despite the loss, they secured a place in the 2007–08 UEFA Cup season thanks to the fact that FK Khazar Lankaran also won the championship. In the UEFA cup they lost 1:0 on aggregate to Groclin Grodzisk.

On 13 August 2007 UEFA declared the club defunct. However, after AFFA's help, they will participate in the Azerbaijan First Division 2009-10. In 2011 the club's owners announced again that club will be dissolved and they will not be participating in the Azerbaijan First Division. However, after a club meeting it was decided that club will participate in 2011–12 Azerbaijan First Division after all.

In 2012, the club's owners announced once again that the club will be dissolved and they will not be participating in the Azerbaijan First Division.

In 2013, the club was re-established and changed its name to Mil-Muğan FK.

Mil-Muğan FK was dissolved on 18 July 2015, after funding was pulled from the club.

== Stadium ==
Heydar Aliyev Stadium is a modern stadium in Imishli, Azerbaijan and is currently used as the club's home ground. It was opened on 23 March 2006 and named after Heydar Aliyev. The stadium holds 8,500 spectators.

== European cup history ==
- Q = Qualifying

Season	Competition	Round	Country	Club	Home	Away	Aggregate
2005/06	UEFA Intertoto Cup	1R	(Moldova)	FC Tiraspol	1–0	0–2	1–2
2007/08	UEFA Cup	Q1	(Poland)	Groclin Grodzisk	0–0	0–1	0–1

== League and domestic cup history ==
As of 03 December 2015:

Season	Div.	Pos.	Pl.	W	D	L	GS	GA	P	Domestic Cup
2004–05	1st	8	34	16	9	9	35	23	57	Semi-finals
2005–06	1st	9	26	9	8	9	31	36	35	Quarter-finals
2006–07	1st	5	24	12	5	7	23	18	41	Runners-up
2009–10	2nd	5	22	11	5	6	41	29	38	Preliminary Round
2010–11	2nd	4	26	15	3	8	49	34	48	1/8 Finals
2011–12	2nd	7	26	11	3	12	35	43	36	Did not enter
2013–14	2nd	9	30	11	7	12	29	33	40	Second round
2014–15	2nd	13	30	7	5	18	30	65	26	Did not enter
2015–16	2nd	8	26	8	8	10	28	26	32	Second round
2016–17	2nd	7	26	13	5	8	53	33	44	Did not enter
2017–18	2nd	8	27	8	6	13	32	49	30	Second round

== Managers ==
- (Azerbaijan) Elshad Ahmadov (2004–2005)
- (Azerbaijan) Nadir Gasimov (2005)
- (Ukraine) Ihor Nakonechnyi (2005–2007)
- (Azerbaijan) Khalig Mustafayev (2009–2012)
- (Azerbaijan) Matlab Mammadov (2013–2014)
- (Azerbaijan) Khalig Mustafayev (2014–present)
