= Shamkir PFC =

Football club in Shamkir, Azerbaijan

- Full name: Shamkir Professional Football Club
- Founded: 2013; 13 years ago (as Gala Shamkir FC)
- Ground: Shamkir Olympic Sport Complex Stadium
- Capacity: 2,500
- Manager: Farid Mamedov
- League: Azerbaijan Second League
- 2025–26: 6th
- Website: https://www.instagram.com/shamkirpfk
Home colours	Away colours

Shamkir PFC or Shamkir Professional Football Club (Azerbaijani: Şəmkir Peşəkar Futbol Klubu) is an Azerbaijani football club based in Shamkir, that currently plays in the Azerbaijan Second League. It is not the successor to Shamkir FC, which ceased operations in 2017. Until 2023, its name was "Gala" (Shamkir) FC.

== History ==
In 2013, the club was founded in the city of Shamkir under the name Gala Football Club ("Gala" FC) by local businessmen from Shamkir, named in honor of the Shamkir Fortress located near the village of Gadimgala (mean old fortress) in the Shamkir region. "Gala" FC mainly represented the Shamkir region in various age categories of the Azerbaijani youth championships. In the 2022/2023 season, it participated in the Azerbaijan Region League. In 2023, "Gala" FC changed its name to "Shamkir" PFC and began competing in the Azerbaijani Second League. It has no historical connection to the Shamkir Football Club that operated until 2017. In August 2024, the club's management changed the team's colors from red and white to gold and white and presented a new logo.

On November 15, 2024, the contract with the head coach of "Shamkir" PFC, Jeyhun Ahmadov, was terminated by mutual consent.

Vugar Nadirov, who had left his post as head coach of Second League side "Hypers Guba" on November 14, was appointed head coach of Shamkir PFC on November 16.

In July 2025, in order to continue the legacy of Shamkir FC—a 2-time Azerbaijani champion that ceased operations in 2017—the club management adopted a new logo and returned to the red and white colors.

On July 25, 2026, the club presented its new dark red and white logo to the public.
