= Shamkir Olympic Sport Complex Stadium =

Sports stadium in Shamkir, Azerbaijan

Coordinates: 40.8545°N 46.0363°E

- Interactive map of Shamkir Olympic Sport Complex Stadium
- Full name: Shamkir city Olympic Sport Complex Stadium
- Location: Shamkir, Azerbaijan
- Capacity: 2,000
- Surface: Grass
- Field size: 110x60

Construction
- Built: 2009

Tenant
- Shamkir PFC

Shamkir Olympic Sport Complex Stadium is a multi-use stadium in Shamkir, Azerbaijan. The stadium was opened in 2009. It is currently used mostly for football matches. It serves as a home ground of Shamkir PFC of the Azerbaijan Second League. The stadium holds 2,000 spectators.
