= Vicko Ševelj =

Croatian footballer

- Ševelj in 2026

Personal information
- Date of birth: 19 September 2000 (age 26)
- Place of birth: Dubrovnik, Croatia
- Height: 1.83 m (6 ft 0 in)
- Positions: Full-back; centre-back; defensive midfielder

Team information
- Current team: Neftçi Baku
- Number: 88

Youth career
- 2008-2011: GOŠK Dubrovnik
- 2011: ŠN Božo Broketa Dubrovnik
- 2011–2015: GOŠK Dubrovnik
- 2015–2016: Dubrovnik 1919
- 2016–2019: Hajduk Split

Senior career*
| Years | Team | Apps | (Gls) |
| 2018–2021 | Hajduk Split II | 42 | (1) |
| 2021 | Hajduk Split | 3 | (0) |
| 2021–2022 | Sarajevo | 5 | (0) |
| 2022 | → Akron Tolyatti (loan) | 0 | (0) |
| 2022 | → Radomlje (loan) | 7 | (0) |
| 2022–2024 | Radomlje | 60 | (0) |
| 2024–2026 | Dundee United | 88 | (2) |
| 2026– | Neftçi Baku | 0 | (0) |

International career^{‡}
| 2019–2023 | Croatia U20 | 5 | (1) |
- * Club domestic league appearances and goals as of 20 May 2026 ‡ National team caps and goals as of 7 June 2023

Vicko Ševelj (born 19 September 2000) is a Croatian professional footballer who plays as a defender for "Neftchi" (Baku).

== Club career ==
Ševelj was born in Dubrovnik, living in its suburb of Mokošica, and played youth football for several local clubs before passing a trial with HNK Hajduk Split in 2015, moving to the club's youth academy in the summer of 2016. A versatile defensive player, Ševelj advanced to the club's second-tier reserve team in 2018, where he would amass 42 caps and 1 goal in three seasons, largely playing as right back.

In April 2021, Ševelj made his first team debut, coming in for Dino Skorup against NK Slaven Belupo in the 60th minute, after the injury of first-choice right back Darko Todorović. His contract expired that summer, however, and he moved on to the Bosnian FK Sarajevo, joining former Hajduk reserve team coach Goran Sablić.

Not finding much playing time at Sarajevo, Ševelj moved to the Russian club Akron Tolyatti on loan in early 2022, returning after two months without any official caps His subsequent loan to the Slovenian side NK Radomlje would be more fruitful, however, as he became a first-team regular and was retained by the club, Sarajevo keeping a percentage of a potential future sale.

On 19 June 2024, Ševelj signed a two-year contract with Scottish Premiership club, Dundee United. Ševelj made 88 appearances and scored 2 goals for Dundee United, earning the Player of the Year award in his first season.

On 31 August 2026, Ševelj left Dundee United to sign a three-year contract with Azerbaijan Premier League club, Neftçi Baku.
