= Maycon Cleiton =

Brazilian footballer (born 1998)

Personal information
- Full name: Maycon Cleiton de Paula Azevedo
- Date of birth: 8 November 1998 (age 28)
- Place of birth: Cuiabá, Brazil
- Height: 1.91 m (6 ft 3 in)
- Position: Goalkeeper

Team information
- Current team: Zira
- Number: 1

Youth career
- 2018–2019: Santa Cruz

Senior career*
Years	Team	Apps	(Gls)
2020–2021	Santa Cruz	45	(0)
2021–2024	Red Bull Bragantino	4	(0)
2024	Vitória	1	(0)
2024	→ Ceará (loan)	0	(0)
2025–2026	Portimonense	18	(0)
2026–	Zira	0	(0)
- * Club domestic league appearances and goals as of 13 September 2026

Maycon Cleiton de Paula Azevedo (born 8 November 1998), known as Maycon Cleiton or simply Maycon, is a Brazilian footballer who plays as a goalkeeper for Azerbaijan Premier League club Zira.

== Club career ==
Born in Cuiabá, Mato Grosso, Maycon Cleiton joined Santa Cruz's youth setup in June 2018, after representing Guarani, Jacuipense, Vitória, Bahia and Atlético Goianiense. Promoted to the main squad for the 2020 season, he made his senior debut on 18 January, starting in a 3–0 Campeonato Pernambucano home win against Petrolina.

On 3 March 2020, already established as a starter, Maycon Cleiton renewed his contract until 2023. He finished the season with 45 appearances overall, as his club narrowly missed out promotion.

On 12 February 2021, Maycon Cleiton signed a contract with Série A side Red Bull Bragantino until December 2025. He spent his first season as a third-choice behind Cleiton and Júlio César.

== Career statistics ==
As of 16 February 2024

Club	Season	League			State League		Cup		Continental		Other		Total	
Club	Season	Division	Apps	Goals	Apps	Goals	Apps	Goals	Apps	Goals	Apps	Goals	Apps	Goals
Santa Cruz	2020	Série C	22	0	12	0	2	0	—		9 (Note: Appearance(s) in Copa do Nordeste)	0	45	0
Red Bull Bragantino	2021	Série A	0	0	0	0	0	0	0	0	—		0	0
Red Bull Bragantino	2022	Série A	0	0	2	0	0	0	0	0	—		2	0
Red Bull Bragantino	2023	Série A	0	0	2	0	0	0	0	0	—		2	0
Red Bull Bragantino	Total		0	0	4	0	0	0	0	0	—		4	0
Vitória (loan)	2024	Série A	0	0	0	0	0	0	—		1	0	1	0
Career total			22	0	16	0	2	0	0	0	10	0	50	0
