= Vieirinha (footballer, born 1996) =

Portuguese footballer

Personal information
- Full name: Filipe da Silva Tavares Vieira
- Date of birth: 28 October 1996 (age 30)
- Place of birth: Santa Maria da Feira, Portugal
- Height: 1.78 m (5 ft 10 in)
- Position: Attacking midfielder

Team information
- Current team: Zira
- Number: 17

Youth career
- 2004–2008: Feirense
- 2008–2010: Porto
- 2010–2015: Feirense

Senior career*
Years	Team	Apps	(Gls)
2015–2017	Feirense	1	(0)
2017	→ Sanjoanense (loan)	9	(2)
2017–2018	Salgueiros	26	(1)
2018–2019	Gondomar	27	(6)
2019–2020	Académico Viseu	0	(0)
2019–2020	→ Espinho (loan)	21	(2)
2020–2022	São João de Ver	52	(5)
2022–2024	Beira-Mar	48	(11)
2024–2026	Olympiakos Nicosia	58	(12)
2026–	Zira	0	(0)
- * Club domestic league appearances and goals as of 08 July 2026

Filipe da Silva Tavares Vieira (born 28 October 1996 in Santa Maria da Feira), known as Vieirinha, is a Portuguese professional footballer who played for Zira as an attacking midfielder.

== Career ==
On 21 June 2026, Vieirinha signed a two-year contract with Azerbaijan Premier League club Zira FK.
