= David Dego =

Israeli footballer

Personal information
- Full name: David Teshager Dego
- Date of birth: 9 May 2001 (age 25)
- Place of birth: Ness Ziona, Israel
- Height: 1.71 m (5 ft 7 1/2 in)
- Position: Midfielder

Team information
- Current team: Ironi Modi'in
- Number: 9

Youth career
- 2010–2011: Sektzia Nes Tziona
- 2011–2018: Maccabi Tel Aviv
- 2018: Hapoel Ramat HaSharon
- 2018–2020: Beitar Jerusalem

Senior career*
Years	Team	Apps	(Gls)
2020–2023	Beitar Jerusalem	17	(1)
2022–2023	→ Hapoel Ramat HaSharon	34	(3)
2023–2025	Ironi Kiryat Shmona	32	(5)
2025	Hapoel Petah Tikva	13	(2)
2025–2026	Hapoel Hadera	15	(2)
2026–	Ironi Modi'in	15	(1)
- * Club domestic league appearances and goals as of 24 June 2026

David Teshager Dego (Hebrew: דוד טשאגר דגו; born 9 May 2001) is an Israeli footballer who currently plays as a midfielder for Ironi Modi'in.

== Career statistics ==
=== Club ===
As of 1 June 2025.

Club	Season	League			State Cup		Toto Cup		Continental		Other		Total	
Club	Season	Division	Apps	Goals	Apps	Goals	Apps	Goals	Apps	Goals	Apps	Goals	Apps	Goals
Beitar Jerusalem	2019–20	Israeli Premier League	2	0	0	0	0	0	–		0	0	2	0
Beitar Jerusalem	2020–21	Israeli Premier League	5	1	1	0	5	0	–		0	0	11	1
Beitar Jerusalem	2021–22	Israeli Premier League	10	0	2	0	0	0	–		0	0	12	0
Beitar Jerusalem	Total		17	1	3	0	5	0	0	0	0	0	25	1
Hapoel Ramat HaSharon	2022–23	Liga Leumit	34	3	2	0	4	0	–		0	0	40	3
Hapoel Ramat HaSharon	Total		34	3	2	0	4	0	0	0	0	0	40	3
Ironi Kiryat Shmona	2023–24	Liga Leumit	27	5	3	0	2	1	–		0	0	32	6
Ironi Kiryat Shmona	2024–25	Israeli Premier League	5	0	0	0	2	0	–		0	0	7	0
Ironi Kiryat Shmona	Total		32	5	3	0	4	1	0	0	0	0	39	6
Hapoel Petah Tikva	2024–25	Liga Leumit	13	2	0	0	0	0	–		0	0	13	2
Hapoel Petah Tikva	Total		13	2	0	0	0	0	0	0	0	0	13	2
Hapoel Hadera	2025–26	Liga Leumit	0	0	0	0	0	0	–		0	0	0	0
Hapoel Hadera	Total		0	0	0	0	0	0	0	0	0	0	0	0
Career total			96	11	8	0	13	1	0	0	0	0	117	12
