= Azerbaijan Second League =

- Organising body: Azerbaijan Professional Football League
- Founded: 4 September 2023; 3 years ago
- Country: Azerbaijan
- Number of clubs: 12
- Level on pyramid: 3
- Promotion to: First League
- Relegation to: Regional League
- Domestic cup: Azerbaijan Cup
- Current champions: Xankəndi (2025–26)
- Website: PFL
- Current: 2026–27 Azerbaijan Second League

The Azerbaijan Second League (Azerbaijani: II Liqa) is the third highest professional division in Azerbaijani professional football.

== Competition format ==
The Second League currently consists of 12 teams. All teams play each other two times.

== Members of the Azerbaijan Second League (2026–27 season) ==
Locations of the 2026–27 Azerbaijan Second League teams.

=== Stadia and locations ===
Note: Table lists in alphabetical order.

Team	Location	Venue	Capacity
Ağdaş	Ağdaş	Agdash City Stadium	2,500
Ağstafa Gəncləri	Agstafa	Agstafa City Stadium	2,100
Difai	Agsu	Agsu City Stadium	3,000
Dinamo	Baku	Bine Stadium	600
Kür-Araz	Imishli	Heydar Aliyev Stadium	8,500
Qaradağ Lökbatan	Baku	Lokbatan OSC Stadium	2,500
Hypers	Barda	Barda City Stadium	
Marafon	Sabirabad	Marafon Arena	
Sheki City	Shaki	Shaki City Stadium	3,500
Şəmkir	Shamkir	Shamkir OSC Stadium	2,500
Şirvan	Shirvan	Shirvan OSC Stadium	720
Zəngəzur	Baku	Bine Stadium	600
