= Breno Almeida =

Brazilian footballer (born 1998)

Personal information
- Full name: Breno de Almeida Mello Santana
- Date of birth: 29 July 1998 (age 28)
- Place of birth: Rio de Janeiro, Brazil
- Height: 1.80 m (5 ft 11 in)
- Position: Midfielder

Team information
- Current team: Neftçi
- Number: 33

Senior career*
Years	Team	Apps	(Gls)
2021	São José		
2021	Figueirense	11	(3)
2022	Jeddah Club	0	(0)
2022–2023	Retrô	10	(0)
2022	Valletta	0	(0)
2023	Nova Iguaçu	4	(1)
2023–2024	Portuguesa	7	(0)
2024	→ Piracicaba (loan)	0	(0)
2024	Sampaio	14	(0)
2024–2025	Ethnikos Achna	44	(5)
2026–	Neftçi	14	(7)
- * Club domestic league appearances and goals as of 24 August 2026

Breno de Almeida Mello Santana (born 29 July 1998), is a Brazilian professional footballer who plays as a midfielder for Azerbaijan Premier League club Neftçi.

== Club career ==
On 10 February 2026, Almeida signed 2.5 years contract with Neftçi PFK.
