= Baku Sporting =

- Full name: Baku Sportinq Futbol Klubu
- Nickname: BSFK
- Founded: 15 September 2018; 8 years ago
- Ground: Baku Sporting Arena
- Capacity: 1,000
- Owner: Yasin Jalilov
- Manager: Elman Sultanov
- League: Azerbaijan First League
- Website: https://bakusporting.com/
Home colours	Away colours

Baku Sportinq Futbol Klubu, also known as Baku Sporting, is a professional football club based in Baku, Azerbaijan. The team plays in the Azerbaijan First League, the second tier of the Azerbaijani football league system.

== Stadium ==
The club plays its home games at the Baku Sporting Arena in Buzovna, Baku, which has a capacity of 1,000 spectators.
