= Guima (footballer, born 1995) =

Mozambican footballer (born 1995)

Personal information
- Full name: Ricardo Martins Guimarães
- Date of birth: 14 November 1995 (age 30)
- Place of birth: Aveiro, Portugal
- Height: 1.81 m (5 ft 11 in)
- Position: Midfielder

Team information
- Current team: Zira
- Number: 21

Youth career
- 2003–2006: Taboeira
- 2006–2007: Benfica
- 2007–2012: Taboeira
- 2012–2014: Oliveirense

Senior career*
Years	Team	Apps	(Gls)
2014–2016	Oliveirense	45	(0)
2016–2019	Sporting CP B	32	(0)
2017–2019	→ Académica (loan)	47	(1)
2019–2021	ŁKS Łódź	25	(2)
2020–2021	→ Académica (loan)	29	(2)
2021–2024	Chaves	71	(1)
2024–2025	Iğdır	13	(0)
2025–	Zira	28	(0)

International career^{‡}
2023–	Mozambique	27	(3)
- * Club domestic league appearances and goals as of 17:24, 14 June 2026 (UTC) ‡ National team caps and goals as of 22:00, 29 September 2026 (UTC)

Ricardo Martins Guimarães (born 14 November 1995), commonly known as Guima, is a professional footballer who plays as a midfielder for Azerbaijan Premier League club Zira FK.

Born in Portugal, he plays for the Mozambique national team.

== Club career ==
Born in Aveiro to a Portuguese father and a Mozambican mother, Guima spent his first five seasons as a senior in the LigaPro, starting out at U.D. Oliveirense. He played his first match in the competition on 27 August 2014, coming on as a late substitute in a 0–1 home loss against S.L. Benfica B.

Guima signed with Sporting CP on 2 July 2016, being assigned to the reserve team. One year later, he joined Académica de Coimbra of the same league on loan. He scored his first goal in the second division on 11 February 2018 in a 4–0 away victory over Gil Vicente FC, being sent off against his former club Oliveirense the following month.

On 27 May 2019, Guima agreed to a three-year contract at ŁKS Łódź. His first game in the Polish Ekstraklasa took place on 3 August, when he played the second half of the 1–2 home defeat to Lech Poznań.

Guima returned to Académica and the Portuguese second tier on 7 September 2020, in a season-long loan. In August 2021, he signed a permanent deal with G.D. Chaves in the same league, scoring once in 20 games in his debut campaign in a promotion to the Primeira Liga via the play-offs.

Guima made his debut in the Portuguese top flight on 7 August 2022, playing 21 minutes of the 0–1 home loss against Vitória de Guimarães. In July 2024, following his team's relegation, he moved to the Turkish TFF 1. Lig with Iğdır FK.

On 8 March 2025, Guima joined Azerbaijan Premier League side Zira FK on a two-and-a-half-year contract.

== International career ==
Guima made his debut for the Mozambique national team on 9 September 2023, scoring in a 3–2 home win over Benin in the 2023 Africa Cup of Nations qualifiers. Manager Chiquinho Conde included him in his squad for the finals, and he was also selected for the following edition of the tournament.

== Career statistics ==
=== International ===
As of match played 29 September 2026

Appearances and goals by national team and year
National team	Year	Apps	Goals
Mozambique
Mozambique	2023	5	1
Mozambique	2024	11	1
Mozambique	2025	8	0
Mozambique	2026	3	1
Total		27	3

Scores and results list Mozambique's goal tally first, score column indicates score after each Guima goal.

List of international goals scored by Guima
No.	Date	Venue	Opponent	Score	Result	Competition
1	9 September 2023	Zimpeto Stadium, Maputo, Mozambique	Benin	2–1	3–2	2023 Africa Cup of Nations qualification
2	10 September 2024	Zimpeto Stadium, Maputo, Mozambique	Guinea-Bissau	1–0	2–1	2025 Africa Cup of Nations qualification
3	29 September 2026	Zimpeto Stadium, Maputo, Mozambique	Sudan	3–0	4–1	2027 Africa Cup of Nations qualification
