= Agsu City Stadium =

Sports venue in Agsu, Azerbaijan

- Ağsu Şəhər Stadionu
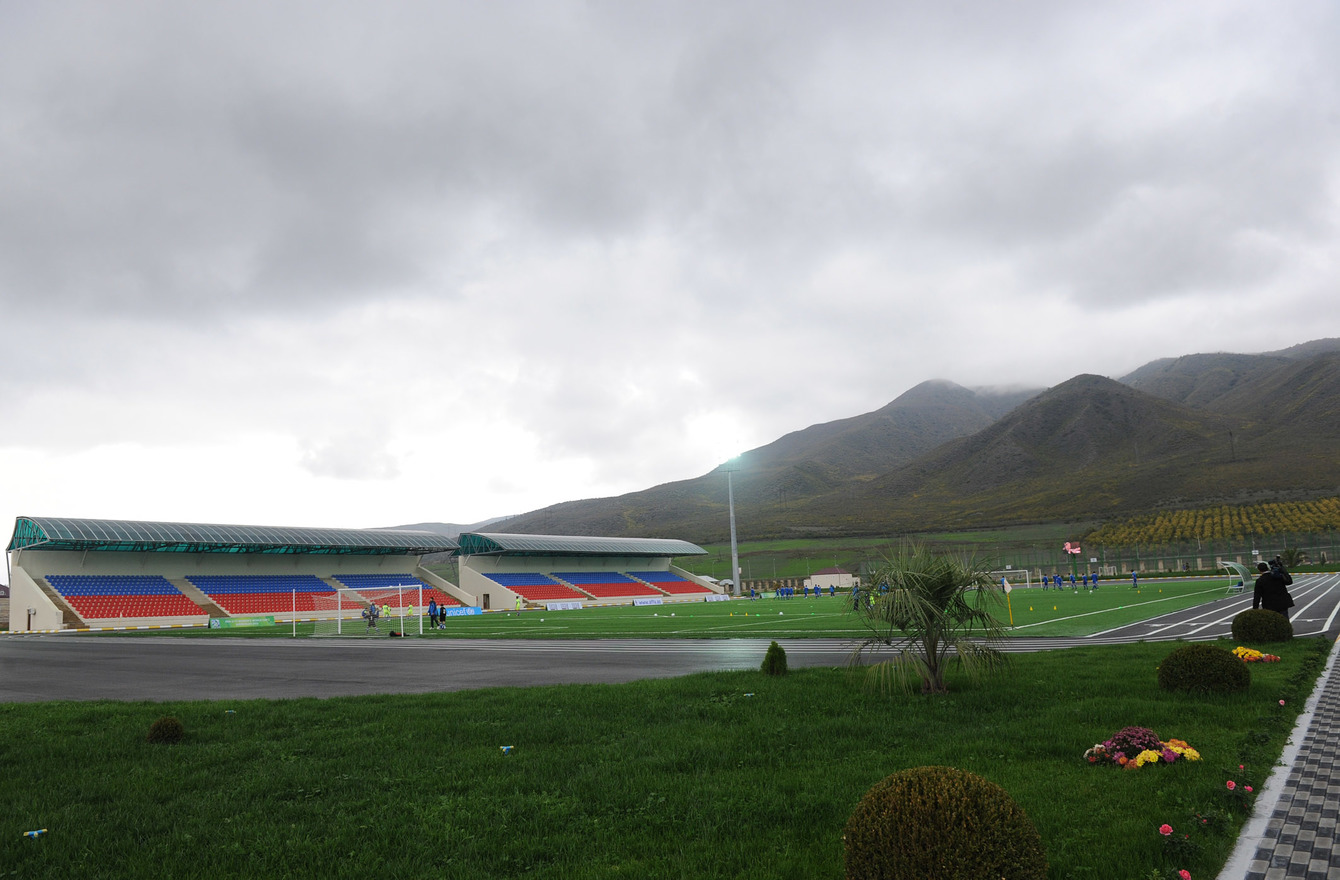
- Agsu City Stadium in 2011
- Interactive map of Agsu City Stadium
- Coordinates: 40°34′36″N 48°22′53″E
- Capacity: 3,120
- Surface: Artificial

Construction
- Opened: 30 October 2011 -->

Tenant
- Ağsu FK

Agsu City Stadium is a multi-use stadium in Agsu, Azerbaijan. It is currently used mostly for football matches. It considered as home ground of Ağsu FK, since 2012.

== See also ==
- List of football stadiums in Azerbaijan
