= Ganjabasar FK =

- Full name: Gəncəbasar Futbol Klubu
- Founded: 2021 September; 5 years ago, as Jabrayil
- Ground: Ganja City Stadium, Ganja, Azerbaijan
- Capacity: 15.343
- President: Həşim Mövsümzadə
- Manager: Elhad Naziri
- League: Azerbaijan First League
- 2025–26: 8th
Home colours	Away colours

Ganjabasar FK (Azerbaijani: Gəncəbasar Futbol Klubu) is a Azerbaijani football club from Ganja.

== History ==
The club was founded in 2021 as Jabrayil and participates in the Azerbaijan Second League.

Jabrayil won the Azerbaijan Regional League in 2022 and advanced to the 2023 UEFA Regions' Cup.

On 5 August 2026, Jabrayil was officially renamed Ganjabasar and relocated to represent the city of Ganja.

== Current squad ==
As of 2 October 2024

Note: Flags indicate national team as defined under FIFA eligibility rules; some limited exceptions apply. Players may hold more than one non-FIFA nationality.

No.	Pos.	Nation	Player
1	GK	AZE	Akpar Valiyev
5	DF	AZE	Vusal Safarov
7	MF	AZE	Polad Ibrahimov
8	MF	AZE	Zeynaddin Abdurahmanov
9	FW	AZE	Ibrahim Ismayilov
10	FW	AZE	Tapdig Ahmadov (captain)
11	MF	AZE	Samir Maharramli
13	MF	AZE	Elshad Aliyev
17	MF	AZE	Nurlan Guliyev
19	DF	AZE	Maharram Orujov
20	MF	AZE	Ashraf Zeynalli

No.	Pos.	Nation	Player
22	MF	AZE	Ali Najafli
31	GK	AZE	Ulvi Mehraliyev
32	MF	AZE	Rahim Jafarli
34	FW	AZE	Taleh Garayev
36	GK	AZE	Amrah Mammadli
44	MF	AZE	Samir Ibrahimov
52	DF	AZE	Emil Bayramov
77	MF	AZE	Zahir Mirzazade
79	MF	AZE	Mirmovsum Janiyev
99	MF	AZE	Okan Tahmazli

== Managers ==
- (Azerbaijan) Javid Huseynov (2021 September–2022 July)
- (Azerbaijan) Azer Nasirov (2022 July–2023 July)
- (Azerbaijan) Javid Huseynov (2023 August–2024 June)
- (Azerbaijan) Elhad Naziri (2024 July–present)
