= Eren Aydın (footballer, born 2003) =

Turkish footballer (born 2003)

Personal information
- Full name: Eren Aydın
- Date of birth: 12 February 2003 (age 23)
- Place of birth: Istanbul, Turkey
- Height: 1.83 m (6 ft 0 in)
- Position: Forward

Team information
- Current team: Zira
- Number: 7

Senior career*
Years	Team	Apps	(Gls)
2022–2025	Galatasaray	0	(0)
2022	→ Niğde Anadolu (loan)	15	(7)
2022–2023	→ Sarıyer (loan)	22	(6)
2023–2024	→ Çorum (loan)	45	(8)
2024–2025	→ Boluspor (loan)	13	(0)
2025	→ Sarıyer (loan)	13	(2)
2025	Veres Rivne	10	(1)
2026–	Zira	11	(2)

International career^{‡}
2021–2022	Turkey U19	11	(1)
2022	Turkey U23	5	(1)
- * Club domestic league appearances and goals as of 23 June 2026 ‡ National team caps and goals as of 23 June 2026

Eren Aydın (born 12 February 2003), is a Turkish professional footballer who plays as a forward for Azerbaijan Premier League club Zira.

== Club career ==
On 10 February 2026, Eren Aydın signed a six-month contract with Zira FK.

On 11 June 2026, Aydın signed a three-year new contract with Zira FK.
