= Lökbatan Olympic Sport Complex Stadium =

Multi-use stadium in Lökbatan, Baku, Azerbaijan

Coordinates: 40.3229°N 49.7361°E

- Interactive map of Lökbatan Olympic Sport Complex Stadium
- Location: Lökbatan, Baku, Azerbaijan
- Capacity: 2,500
- Surface: Grass

Construction
- Opened: 2007

Tenant
- Qaradağ Lökbatan FK

Lökbatan Olympic Sport Complex Stadium, is a multi-use stadium in Lökbatan settlement of Baku, Azerbaijan. It is the home stadium of Qaradağ Lökbatan FK. The stadium holds 2,500 people and opened in 2007.

== See also ==
- List of football stadiums in Azerbaijan
