= Shamakhi City Stadium =

Stadium in Shamakhi, Azerbaijan

Coordinates: 40.6406°N 48.6355°E

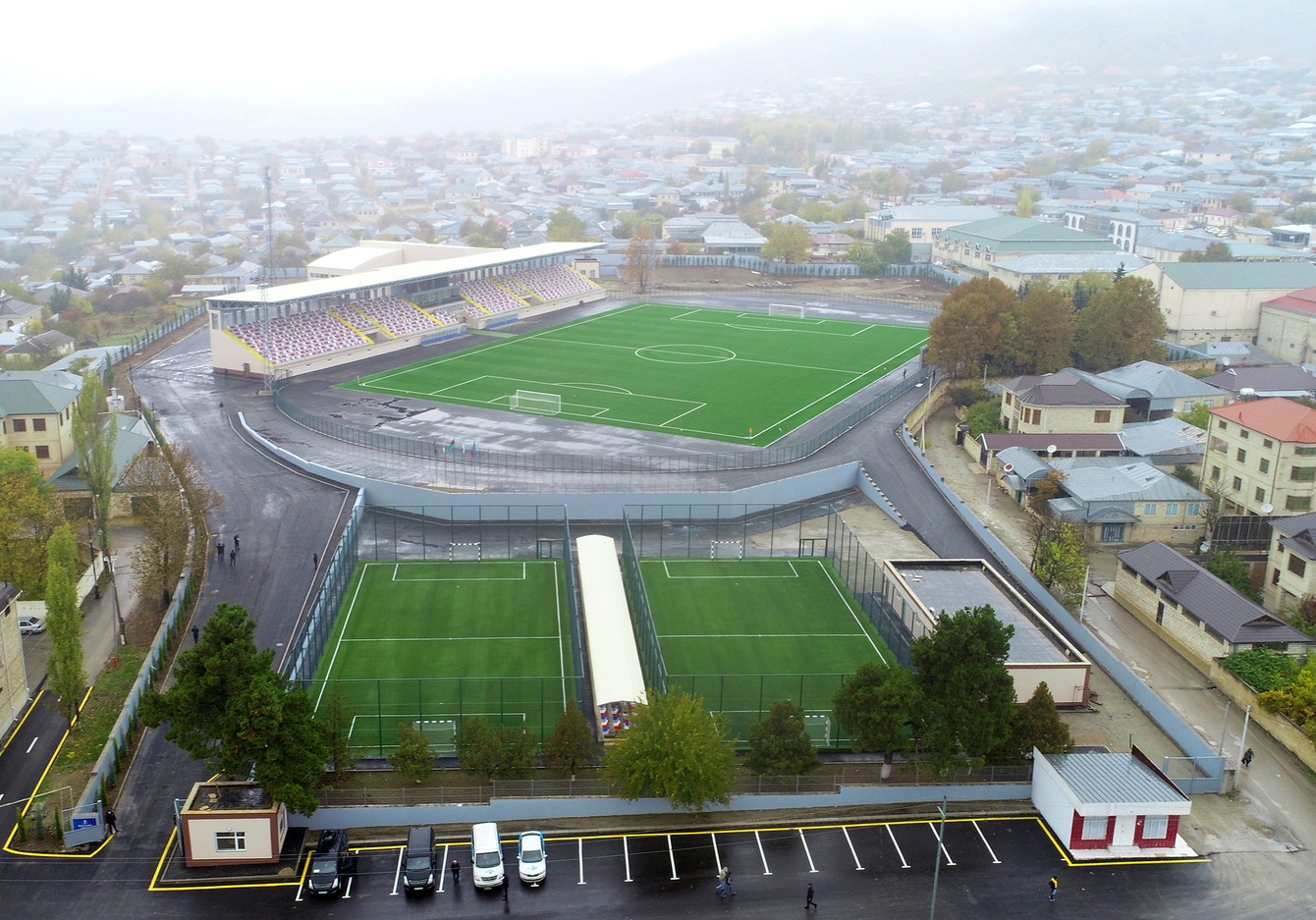
- Interactive map of Shamakhi City Stadium
- Full name: Shamakhi City Stadium
- Location: Shamakhi, Azerbaijan
- Capacity: 2,176
- Surface: Artificial
- Scoreboard: Yes

Tenant
- Shamakhi FK

Shamakhi City Stadium is a multi-use stadium in Shamakhi, Azerbaijan.
