= İmişli FK =

İmişli
- Full name: İmişli Futbol Klubu
- Nickname: Pələnglər (The Tigers)
- Founded: 2022; 4 years ago
- Ground: Heydar Aliyev – MKT Araz Stadium, Imishli, Azerbaijan
- Capacity: 8,500
- Chairman: Kamran Eyyubov
- Manager: Ervins Perkons
- League: Azerbaijan Premier League
- 2025–26: Azerbaijan Premier League, 9th of 12
Home colours	Away colours

İmişli Futbol Klubu (pronounced [imiʃli]) is an Azerbaijani professional football club based in Imishli that participates in the Azerbaijan Premier League after promotion from the Azerbaijan First Division in 2025.

Imishli is a phoenix club of the former MKT Araz FK founded in 2004, which was dissolved in 2018.

== History ==
In 2022, the club was established as a phoenix club of the former MKT Araz FK founded in 2004, which was dissolved in 2018.

== Stadium ==
Heydar Aliyev Stadium is a modern stadium in Imishli, Azerbaijan and is currently used as the club's home ground. It was opened on 23 March 2006 and named after Heydar Aliyev. The stadium holds 8,500 spectators.

== Players ==
=== Current squad ===
As of 17 July 2026

Note: Flags indicate national team as defined under FIFA eligibility rules; some limited exceptions apply. Players may hold more than one non-FIFA nationality.

No.	Pos.	Nation	Player
1	GK	AZE	Yusif İmanov
3	DF	AZE	Tuncay Yusifli
5	MF	AZE	Idris Ingilabli
6	MF	GHA	Yaw Moses
7	MF	BRA	Juninho
8	MF	COL	Juan Hernandez
9	FW	POR	Diogo Almeida
10	FW	POR	Diogo Cardoso
11	MF	AZE	Vüsal Ganbarov
13	DF	BRA	Rafael Viegas
14	DF	AZE	Bekhtiyar Hasanalizade
17	FW	AZE	Seykhan Faracov

No.	Pos.	Nation	Player
19	DF	AZE	Azər Salahlı (captain)
22	GK	AZE	Sadiq Mammadzada
23	DF	BRA	Diogo Rollo
29	DF	COL	Edwin Banguera
30	MF	AZE	Xalil Mürsalli
42	MF	CIV	Yvan Senin
70	DF	AZE	Mehdi Tahirov
77	MF	AZE	Farid Nabiyev
80	MF	ANG	Deco
88	GK	AZE	Aykhan Abbaszadeh

For recent transfers, see Transfers summer 2025.

== Club officials ==
=== Management ===
Position	Staff
President	(Azerbaijan) Kamran Eyyubov
Sports director	(Azerbaijan) Tamerlan Bakirzade

=== Coaching staff ===
Position	Name
Head coach	(Portugal) Jorge Casquilha
Assistant coach	(Portugal) Cristiano Sousa (Portugal) Guilherme Cadete
Goalkeeping coach	(Azerbaijan) Elshad Tahirov
Physiologist	(United States) Ulian Goga

== Managers ==
- (Azerbaijan) Ruhid Usubov (2022–2023)
- (Azerbaijan) Asgar Abdullayev (2023 September–2024 June)
- (Azerbaijan) Farid Namazov (2024 July–2025 June)
- (Portugal) Jorge Casquilha (2025 June–2026 June)
- (Azerbaijan) Farid Namazov (2026 July-2026 October)
- (Latvia) Ervins Perkons (2026 October-)
