= List of football stadiums in Azerbaijan =

This is a list of football stadiums in Azerbaijan, ranked in order of capacity, with the minimum capacity being 1,000.

== Current stadiums ==
#	Image	Stadium	Capacity	City	Home team	Opened
1		Baku National Stadium	69,870	Baku	Azerbaijan	2015
2		Tofiq Bahramov Republican Stadium	31,200	Baku	Azerbaijan, Qarabağ	1951
3	Ganja City New Stadium	Ganja City Stadium	15,464	Ganja	Kəpəz	2025
4	Lankaran City Stadium	Lankaran City Stadium	15,000	Lankaran	Azerbaijan, Khazar Lankaran	2006
5		Khankendi Stadium	8,500	Khankendi	Azerbaijan, Qarabağ, Azerbaijan Cup (some match)	1956
6		Nakhchivan City Stadium	12,800	Nakhchivan City	Araz PFK	2013
7		Bakcell Arena	10,200	Baku	Azerbaijan, Neftçi	2012
8	Mehdi Huseynzade Stadium	Mehdi Huseynzade Stadium	9,000	Sumgayit	Sumgayit FC	2024
9		Bank Respublika Arena	8,700	Masazir	Sabah FC	2014
10		Heydar Aliyev Stadium	8,500	Imishli	Mil-Muğan	2006
11		ASK Arena	8,300	Baku	Inter	2001
12		Barda Stadium	7,500	Barda	Vacant	
13		Tovuz City Stadium	6,500	Tovuz	Turan-Tovuz	1979
14		Dalga Arena	6,500	Baku	Azerbaijan	2011
15		Azersun Arena	5,200	Baku	Qarabağ	2001
16		Yashar Mammadzade Stadium	5,000	Mingachevir	Energetik	1953
17		Yevlakh City Stadium	5,000	Yevlakh	Karvan FK	2005
18		Gabala City Stadium	4,500	Gabala	Gabala	1985
19		Zaqatala City Stadium	3,500	Zaqatala	Zagatala	2008
20		Qazakh City Stadium	3,500	Qazakh	Göyəzən	
21		Bayil Stadium	3,200	Baku	Ravan Baku	2012
22		Shovkat Ordukhanov Stadium	3,000	Qusar	Şahdağ	
23		AZAL Arena	3,000	Baku	AZAL	2009
24		Agsu City Stadium	3,000	Agsu	Ağsu	2012
25		Lökbatan Olympic Sport Complex Stadium	2,500	Lökbatan	Qaradağ	2012
26		Guzanli Olympic Complex Stadium	2,000	Quzanlı	Qarabağ	
27		Shamkir Olympic Sport Complex Stadium	2,000	Shamkir	Shamkir	2009
28		Nariman Narimanov Stadium	2,000	Neftchala	Neftchala	
29		Salyan Olympic Sport Complex Stadium	2,000	Salyan	FK Mughan	2007
30		Ujar Central Stadium	2,000	Ujar	Vacant	1973
31		Qala Olympic Sport Complex Stadium	1,500	Baku	Vacant	
32	Kapital Bank Arena	Kapital Bank Arena	1,300	Sumgayit	Sumgayit	2014
33		Zira Olympic Sport Complex Stadium	1,200	Baku	Zira FK	
34		Aghdara Stadium	1,200	Aghdara	Vacant	
35		Khojavend rayon Stadium	1,080	Khojavend	Vacant	2019
36		Shagan Olympic Sport Complex Stadium	1,032	Baku	Vacant	2009

== See also ==
- List of European stadiums by capacity
- 2012 FIFA U-17 Women's World Cup
- UEFA Euro 2020
- Lists of stadiums
