= 2007–08 Azerbaijan First Division =

Football league season

Azerbaijan First Division
- Season: 2007–08
- Champions: Bakılı
- Promoted: Bakili; MOIK Baku; Mughan

In the 2007–08 season, the Azerbaijan First Division—the second tier of professional football in Azerbaijan—was organised in two groups, A and B, each with 10 teams. The top three teams in each group entered a playoff competition. The winning team was Bakılı PFK of Baku.

== Group A ==
Location of teams in Azerbaijan Premier League 2007-08

=== Stadia and locations ===
Note: Table lists in alphabetical order.

Team	Location	Venue	Capacity
Absheron FK	Baku		
Adliyya Baku	Baku	Adliyya Stadium	7,000
ANSAD-Petrol Neftçala	Neftçala	Nariman Narimanov Stadium	4,000
NBC Salyan	Salyan	Salyan Olympic Sport Complex Stadium	2,000
Spartak Guba	Quba	Quba City Stadium	2,000
Bakili Baku	Baku	Shafa Stadium	8,000
Garabagh-2	Aghdam		
Inter-2	Baku		
Baku-2	Baku		
Samukh FK	Samukh		

=== League table ===
Pos	Team	Pld	W	D	L	GF	GA	GD	Pts	Qualification
1	Mughan	16	10	4	2	26	8	+18	34	Qualification for final stage
2	Bakili	16	8	6	2	32	13	+19	30	Qualification for final stage
3	ANSAD-Petrol Neftçala	16	6	7	3	33	22	+11	25	Qualification for final stage
4	Qarabağ-2 FK	16	6	6	4	27	14	+13	24	
5	İnter-2 Baku	16	6	4	6	17	24	−7	22	
6	Baku-2 Baku	16	4	6	6	15	19	−4	18	
7	Spartak Guba	16	3	2	11	15	37	−22	11	
8	Adliyya Baku	16	0	1	15	5	46	−41	1	
9	FC Absheron	16	10	2	4	31	18	+13	32	
10	Samukh FK	0	0	0	0	0	0	0	0	

Source: Pfl.az
Rules for classification: 1) points; 2) goal difference; 3) number of goals scored.

== Group B ==
Location of teams in Azerbaijan Premier League 2007-08

=== Stadia and locations ===
Note: Table lists in alphabetical order.

Team	Location	Venue	Capacity
Energetik	Mingachevir	Yashar Mammadzade Stadium	5,000
Göyazan	Qazax	Qazakh City Stadium	3,500
MKT-Araz	Imishli	Heydar Aliyev Stadium	8,500
Shahdag	Qusar	Şövkət Orduxanov Stadium	4,000
MOIK Baku	Baku	MOIK Stadium	3,000
Neftchi-2	Baku		
Xazar-Lenkaran-2	Lankaran		
Turan-2	Tovuz		
Standard-2 FC	Baku		
GEN Baku	Baku		

=== League table ===
Pos	Team	Pld	W	D	L	GF	GA	GD	Pts	Qualification
1	FK MKT-Araz	16	10	4	2	26	8	+18	34	Qualification for final stage
2	MOIK Baku	16	8	6	2	32	13	+19	30	Qualification for final stage
3	Şahdağ	16	6	7	3	33	22	+11	25	Qualification for final stage
4	Göyəzən	16	6	6	4	27	14	+13	24	
5	Neftchi-2 Baku	16	6	4	6	17	24	−7	22	
6	Energetik	16	4	6	6	15	19	−4	18	
7	Khazar-Lankaran-2	16	3	2	11	15	37	−22	11	
8	Turan-2 Tovuz	16	0	1	15	5	46	−41	1	
9	Standard-2 FC	16	10	2	4	31	18	+13	32	
10	GEN Baku	0	0	0	0	0	0	0	0	

Source: Pfl.az
Rules for classification: 1) points; 2) goal difference; 3) number of goals scored.

== Final stage ==
=== Gold points ===
Pos	Team	Pld	W	D	L	GF	GA	GD	Pts
1	MOIK Baku	4	3	1	0	5	2	+3	10
2	Bakili	4	2	2	0	5	2	+3	8
3	ANSAD-Petrol Neftçala	4	1	1	2	4	5	−1	4
4	Şahdağ	4	1	1	2	3	4	−1	4
5	Mughan	4	1	1	2	3	5	−2	4
6	FK MKT-Araz	4	1	0	3	3	5	−2	3

=== Final game ===
Pos	Team	Pld	W	D	L	GF	GA	GD	Pts
1	Mughan	6	3	3	0	5	2	+3	12
2	Bakili	6	3	2	1	5	2	+3	11
3	FK MKT-Araz	6	3	1	2	4	5	−1	10
4	MOIK Baku	6	1	4	1	3	4	−1	7
5	ANSAD-Petrol Neftçala	6	2	1	3	3	5	−2	7
6	Şahdağ	6	0	1	5	3	5	−2	1

=== Final table ===
Pos	Team	Pld	W	D	L	GF	GA	GD	Pts	Promotion
1	Bakili (C, P)	10	5	4	1	5	2	+3	19	Promotion to Azerbaijan Premier League
2	MOIK Baku (P)	10	4	5	1	5	2	+3	17	Promotion to Azerbaijan Premier League
3	Mughan (P)	10	4	4	2	4	5	−1	16	Promotion to Azerbaijan Premier League
4	FK MKT-Araz	10	4	1	5	3	4	−1	13	
5	ANSAD-Petrol Neftçala	10	3	2	5	3	5	−2	11	
6	Şahdağ	10	1	2	7	3	5	−2	5	

(C) Champions; (P) Promoted
