= 2010–11 in Azerbaijani football =

2011 season

This list details major events in Azerbaijani football in 2010-11. In that year Neftçi PFK won the Azerbaijan Premier League championship, while Georgi Adamia of Qarabağ FK led the league with 18 goals that season.

== Azerbaijan Premier League ==
Pos	Team	Pld	W	D	L	GF	GA	GD	Pts	Qualification
1	Neftçi Baku	22	14	6	2	40	9	+31	48	Qualification for championship group
2	Khazar Lankaran	22	14	5	3	28	12	+16	47	Qualification for championship group
3	Qarabağ	22	13	3	6	30	14	+16	42	Qualification for championship group
4	Inter Baku	22	12	4	6	24	16	+8	40	Qualification for championship group
5	AZAL	22	9	9	4	27	16	+11	36	Qualification for championship group
6	Baku	22	9	6	7	28	21	+7	33	Qualification for championship group
7	Gabala	22	8	7	7	19	14	+5	31	Qualification for relegation group
8	Mughan	22	7	6	9	14	23	−9	27	Qualification for relegation group
9	Ganja	22	5	9	8	23	27	−4	24	Qualification for relegation group
10	Turan	22	3	6	13	17	35	−18	15	Qualification for relegation group
11	Simurq	22	2	6	14	12	34	−22	12	Qualification for relegation group
12	MOIK Baku	22	1	3	18	6	47	−41	6	Qualification for relegation group

Source: Soccerway.com
Rules for classification: 1) points; 2) goal difference; 3) number of goals scored.

=== Championship group ===
Pos	Team	Pld	W	D	L	GF	GA	GD	Pts	Qualification
1	Neftçi Baku (C)	32	19	10	3	53	17	+36	67	Qualification for Champions League second qualifying round
2	Khazar Lankaran	32	16	12	4	38	18	+20	60	Qualification for Europa League second qualifying round (Note: Khazar Lankaran won the 2010–11 Azerbaijan Cup and therefore qualified for the second qualifying round of the 2011–12 UEFA Europa League.)
3	Qarabağ	32	17	7	8	41	22	+19	58	Qualification for Europa League first qualifying round
4	AZAL	32	13	10	9	36	28	+8	49	Qualification for Europa League first qualifying round
5	Inter Baku	32	13	10	9	29	24	+5	49	
6	Baku	32	10	10	12	33	32	+1	40	

Source: Soccerway.com
Rules for classification: 1) points; 2) goal difference; 3) number of goals scored.
(C) Champions

=== Relegation group ===
Pos	Team	Pld	W	D	L	GF	GA	GD	Pts	Relegation
7	Gabala	32	13	12	7	31	18	+13	51	
8	Mughan	32	13	8	11	29	31	−2	47	
9	Ganja	32	8	12	12	33	37	−4	36	
10	Turan	32	7	6	19	24	47	−23	27	
11	Simurq (R)	32	4	7	21	20	52	−32	19	Relegation to Azerbaijan First Division
12	MOIK Baku (R)	32	4	6	22	14	55	−41	18	Relegation to Azerbaijan First Division

Source: Soccerway.com
Rules for classification: 1) points; 2) goal difference; 3) number of goals scored.
(R) Relegated

== Azerbaijan First Division ==
Pos	Team	Pld	W	D	L	GF	GA	GD	Pts	Promotion
1	FC Absheron (P)	26	23	3	0	75	6	+69	72	Promotion to Azerbaijan Premier League
2	Ravan Baku (P)	26	19	3	4	54	14	+40	60	Promotion to Azerbaijan Premier League
3	Bakili	26	16	4	6	37	24	+13	52	
4	Qaradağ Lökbatan	26	15	5	6	47	24	+23	50	
5	FK MKT-Araz	26	15	3	8	49	34	+15	48	
6	Şahdağ	26	13	8	5	45	22	+23	47	
7	Sumgayit	26	13	5	8	34	26	+8	44	
8	Karvan	26	6	8	12	26	40	−14	26	
9	Şəmkir	26	5	7	14	15	36	−21	22	
10	ANSAD-Petrol Neftçala	26	5	6	15	28	48	−20	21	
11	Göyəzən	26	5	4	17	22	50	−28	19	
12	Energetik	26	4	6	16	17	50	−33	18	
13	Şuşa	26	3	8	15	20	41	−21	17	
14	Adliyya Baku	26	3	4	19	13	67	−54	13	

Source: Soccerways
Rules for classification: 1) points; 2) goal difference; 3) number of goals scored.
(P) Promoted

== Azerbaijan Cup ==
24 May 2011
20:00 AZST

Inter Baku	1 – 1 (a.e.t.)	Khazar Lankaran
Karlsons 100'		91' Parks
Penalties
	2 – 4

Tofiq Bahramov Stadium, Baku
Attendance: 10,000
