= 2025–26 Azerbaijan First League =

Azerbaijan First League
- Season: 2025–26
- Matches: 68
- Goals: 198 (2.91 per match)
- Top goalscorer: Ruslan Voronsov and Elmin Zamanov (3 goals)
- Biggest home win: Jabrayil 7–0 Shimal (20 November 2025)
- Biggest away win: Shimal 0–4 Zagatala (26 November 2025)
- Highest scoring: Jabrayil 7–0 Shimal (20 November 2025); Difai 5–2 Jabrayil (25 December 2025)
- All statistics correct as of 22 May 2026.

Azerbaijan First League 2025/2026—the 34th season of the Azerbaijan First League, the second-highest football league in Azerbaijan, organized by the Azerbaijan Professional Football League.

At the meeting of the AFFA Licensing Committee held on May 8, 2025, prior to the season, the clubs Jabrayil FK, Dinamo Baku FK, Hypers Quba FK, Qaradağ Lökbatan FK, Mingachevir FK, MOIK Baku, Shahdag Qusar FK, Shafa FK, Shamkir FK, Shimal FK, and Zagatala PFK were granted licenses to participate in the First League competitions, while the clubs Araz Saatlı FK and Fuzuli FK were denied licenses.

The 2025/2026 season of the Azerbaijan First League started on 11 September 2025.

== Teams ==
A total of 10 teams would compete, with the winners promoted to the Azerbaijan Premier League and the team who finished last relegated to the Azerbaijan Second League.

Team	Location	Venue	Capacity
Baku Sporting	Baku	Baku Sporting Arena	600
Cəbrayıl	Jabrayil	ASCO Arena	3,200
Difai Ağsu	Agsu	Agsu City Stadium	3,000
Mingəçevir	Mingachevir	Yashar Mammadzade Stadium	5,200
MOİK	Baku	Bine Stadium	1,800
Sabail	Baku	ASCO Arena	3,200
Shafa	Baku	ASK Arena	5,800
Shahdag Qusar	Shamakhi	Shamakhi OSC Stadium	2,000
Shimal	Siyazan	Siyazan City Stadium	980
Zaqatala	Zaqatala	Zaqatala City Stadium	2,800

== League table ==
Pos	Team	Pld	W	D	L	GF	GA	GD	Pts	Promotion, qualification or relegation
1	Shafa	27	16	9	2	52	21	+31	57	Promotion to the Azerbaijan Premier League
2	Mingaçevir	27	15	6	6	55	27	+28	51	Qualification to the Azerbaijan Premier League play-off
3	Sabail	27	14	8	5	46	21	+25	50	
4	Baku Sporting	27	13	10	4	40	23	+17	49	
5	Shahdag Qusar	27	12	7	8	36	27	+9	43	
6	MOIK	27	9	6	12	33	39	−6	33	
7	Zagatala	27	8	4	15	27	44	−17	28	
8	Jabrayil	27	7	3	17	40	56	−16	24	
9	Shimal	27	5	5	17	23	61	−38	20	Qualification to the Azerbaijan First Division play-off
10	Difai Ağsu	27	4	6	17	28	60	−32	18	Relegation to the Azerbaijan Second Division

Updated to match(es) played on 22 May 2026. Source:

== Results ==
Home \ Away	BSP	JAB	DIF	MIN	MOIK	SEB	SHG	SHA	SHI	ZAG	BSP	JAB	DIF	MIN	MOIK	SEB	SHG	SHA	SHI	ZAG
Baku Sportinq	—	2–0	2–2	Mar 7	2–0	0–0	2–1	1–2	4–1	2–1	—									
Jabrayil	Feb 18	—	4–0	1–3	2–2	Mar 7	3–1	0–1	7–0	Mar 12		—								
Difai	Mar 12	5–2	—	1–1	1–2	1–2	1–2	Feb 25	3–1	1–2			—							
Mingachevir	1–2	2–0	2–0	—	Mar 25	Mar 12	1–1	2–3	3–1	0–0				—						
MOIK	0–0	4–1	Mar 7	0–3	—	Feb 18	1–2	0–2	2–0	0–1					—					
Sabail	Feb 24	0–2	3–0	2–0	1–0	—	2–0	0–0	3–4	1–0						—				
Shahdag Qusar	2–3	4–2	4–0	0–0	Mar 12	2–2	—	0–2	4–2	Feb 25							—			
Shafa Baku	1–1	3–0	1–1	Feb 19	4–1	2–2	Mar 7	—	2–0	1–1								—		
Shimal	0–1	24 Feb	1–4	0–3	1–1	0–0	19 Feb	Mar 12	—	0–4									—	
Zagatala	1–1	1–0	19 Feb	2–3	1–3	0–1	1–0	0–4	Mar 7	—										—

Updated to match(es) played on 14 February 2026. Source:
Legend: Blue = home team win; Yellow = draw; Red = away team win.

== Season statistics ==
=== Top scorers ===
As of 12 February 2026

Rank	Player	Club	Goals
1	(Azerbaijan) Seykhan Faracov	MOIK	12
2	(Azerbaijan) Ruslan Voronsov	Sabail	7
3	(Zambia) Kenneth Kalunga	Mingachevir	6
3	(Azerbaijan) Khayyam Mammadli	Baku Sportinq	6
3	(Azerbaijan) Ilham Allahverdiyev	Baku Sportinq	6
3	(Cameroon) Dileyn Açimi	Jabrayil	6
7	(Azerbaijan) Kamran Quliyev	Sabail	5
7	(Azerbaijan) Emil Qasımov	Sabail	5
9	(Iran) Amir Ebrahimzadeh	Shafa	4
9	(Azerbaijan) Parviz Azadov	Shafa	4
9	(Azerbaijan) Nihad Quliyev	Shafa	4
9	(Azerbaijan) Elnur Jafarov	Shafa	4
9	(Azerbaijan) Emin Zamanov	Shafa	4
