= 2016–17 Azerbaijan First Division =

Azerbaijan First Division
- Season: 2016–17

The 2016–17 Azerbaijan First Division was the 25th season of the second level of football in Azerbaijan. Neftchala FK were the defending champions.

== Teams ==
No team was promoted from the 2015–16 season, whilst Ravan Baku dropped back to the First Division. Reigning champions Neftchala, along with Baku both didn't participate in this season.

=== Stadia and locations ===
Note: Table lists in alphabetical order.

Location of teams in 2016-17 Azerbaijan First Division

Team	Location	Venue	Capacity
Ağsu	Agsu	Agsu City Stadium	3,000
Bakılı	Baku	Zirə Olympic Sport Complex Stadium	1,500
Energetik	Mingachevir	Yashar Mammadzade Stadium	5,000
Göyəzən	Qazakh	Qazakh City Stadium	5,000
Mil-Muğan	Imishli	Heydar Aliyev Stadium	8,500
MOIK	Baku	MOIK Stadium	3,000
Qaradağ Lökbatan	Lökbatan	Lökbatan Olympic Sport Complex Stadium	2,000
Ravan	Baku	Bayil Stadium	5,000
Şərurspor	Baku	Bayil Stadium	5,000
Səbail	Baku	Bayil Stadium	5,000
Şahdağ	Qusar	Şövkət Orduxanov Stadium	3,000
Shamkir	Shamkir	Shamkir Olympic Sport Complex Stadium	2,000
Turan	Tovuz	Tovuz City Stadium	6,800
Zaqatala	Zaqatala	Zaqatala City Stadium	3,500

== League table ==
Pos	Team	Pld	W	D	L	GF	GA	GD	Pts	Promotion
1	Turan Tovuz	26	18	7	1	62	11	+51	61	
2	Səbail	26	18	3	5	80	25	+55	57	Promotion to Azerbaijan Premier League
3	Ağsu	26	16	5	5	63	21	+42	53	
4	Qaradağ Lökbatan	26	17	1	8	64	31	+33	52	
5	Zaqatala	26	15	4	7	69	31	+38	49	
6	Şəmkir	26	15	3	8	41	20	+21	48	
7	Mil-Muğan	26	13	5	8	53	33	+20	44	
8	MOIK Baku	26	10	6	10	47	31	+16	36	
9	Şahdağ	26	8	6	12	36	45	−9	30	
10	Şərurspor	26	7	4	15	36	54	−18	25	
11	Energetik	26	5	5	16	25	86	−61	20	
12	Bakili	26	3	2	21	30	99	−69	11	
13	Ravan (Note: Ravan deducted 9 points)	26	6	1	19	24	70	−46	10	
14	Göyəzən	26	2	4	20	20	99	−79	10	

Source: soccerway.com
Rules for classification: 1) points; 2) head-to-head points; 3) head-to-head goal difference; 4) head-to-head goals scored; 5. head-to-head away goals (only if 2 teams are tied); 6) goal difference; 7) goals scored.

=== Results ===
Home \ Away	AGU	BKL	ENG	ATM	ARZ	MOI	QAD	RAV	SAB	SER	ABB	SHA	TUR	ZAG
Ağsu		7–0	5–1	7–0	0–2	1–0	2–0	5–2	3–2	4–0	4–1	2–1	1–1	4–0
Bakili	0–0		2–4	4–0	3–2	1–3	1–3	1–5	1–7	0–1	3–2	0–3	0–7	3–6
Energetik	0–2	1–1		3–3	2–4	0–4	0–4	1–0	1–2	1–1	1–0	0–5	1–7	0–0
Göyəzən	0–6	2–0	0–0		3–7	0–5	0–3	3–0	0–7	3–3	1–1	0–2	0–4	1–3
Mil-Muğan	2–0	4–1	8–1	6–2		1–0	2–4	0–1	0–3	1–1	3–0	1–1	0–0	0–1
MOIK Baku	1–0	4–1	6–0	6–1	0–2		2–2	1–1	0–2	1–0	6–0	0–0	2–2	0–3
Qaradağ	3–0	6–1	5–0	5–0	0–1	3–0		4–1	4–2	0–2	2–1	1–0	2–1	3–2
Ravan Baku	0–3	3–2	0–3	2–1	2–1	1–3	0–3		0–4	0–3	0–3	2–1	0–2	1–5
Səbail	1–1	11–3	3–0	6–0	1–0	4–1	3–1	3–0		3–0	5–1	1–0	0–0	1–2
Şərurspor	0–3	5–0	0–3	5–0	0–1	2–2	2–4		2–3		3–1	0–4	0–3	4–3
Şahdağ	1–2	3–0	2–1	4–0	2–2	0–0	2–1	4–1	0–4	3–0		1–0	1–1	1–1
Şəmkir	0–0	2–1	5–1	1–0	0–2	1–0	2–0	3–1	2–0	3–2	1–0		0–1	2–1
Turan-T	0–0	3–0	7–0	4–0	1–1	1–0	2–1	5–0	2–1	2–0	1–0	2–0		2–1
Zaqatala	3–1	5–1	10–0	5–0	4–0	2–0	2–0	3–1	1–1	3–0	2–2	1–2	0–1	

Source: Birinci Dasta Table
Legend: Blue = home team win; Yellow = draw; Red = away team win.
