= Murad Aghakishiyev =

Azerbaijani footballer (born 1985)

Personal information
- Date of birth: 13 June 1985 (age 41)
- Place of birth: Baku, Azerbaijan SSR, Soviet Union
- Height: 1.78 m (5 ft 10 in)
- Position: Midfielder

Senior career*
Years	Team	Apps	(Gls)
2001–2004	Shafa Baku	17	(2)
2004–2005	MOIK Baku	21	(3)
2005–2007	MKT Araz	58	(13)
2007–2009	Qarabağ	35	(1)
2008–2009	Karvan	13	(2)
2009–2010	Standard Sumgayit	22	(0)
2010–2011	Absheron		
2011–2012	Karvan	21	(7)
2012–2013	Turan Tovuz	23	(1)
2012–2013	Qaradağ	14	(4)
2013–2015	Neftchala	19	(8)
2015–2016	Kapaz	4	(0)

International career
2007	Azerbaijan	3	(0)
- * Club domestic league appearances and goals

Murad Aghakishiyev (Azerbaijani: Murad Agakisiyev; born 13 June 1985) is a former football midfielder from Azerbaijan.

== Career ==
=== Club ===
Aghakishiyev started his career with Shafa Baku, before moving to MOIK Baku, MKT Araz, Qarabağ, Karvan, Standard Sumgayit and Absheron before joining Turan Tovuz.

=== International ===
Aghakishiyev debuted for the national team in 2007.

== Career statistics ==
=== International ===
Azerbaijan
Year	Apps	Goals
2007	3	0
Total	3	0

Statistics accurate as of match played 22 August 2007

== Honours ==
Absheron

- Azerbaijan First Division (1): 2010–11

Neftchala

- Azerbaijan First Division (1): 2014–15
