= 2019–20 Azerbaijan First Division =

Azerbaijan First Division
- Season: 2019–20

The 2019–20 Azerbaijan First Division is the second-level of football in Azerbaijan. MOIK Baku were the defending champions.

== Teams ==
On 8 August 2019, it was announced that Shuvalan wouldn't participate in this season.

Team	Location	Venue	Capacity
Ağsu	Agsu	Agsu City Stadium	3,000
Kapaz	Ganja	Ganja City Stadium	25,000
Keşla-2	Keshla	ASK Arena	5,800
MOIK Baku	Baku	Lökbatan Olympic Sport Complex Stadium	2,500
Neftçi-2	Baku	ASK Arena	5,800
Qarabağ-2	Aghdam	Azersun Arena	5,200
Qaradağ Lökbatan	Lökbatan	Lökbatan Olympic Sport Complex Stadium	2,500
Sabah-2	Baku	Bank Respublika Arena	13,000
Sabail-2	Səbail	ASCO Arena	3,200
Sumgayit-2	Sumqayit	Kapital Bank Arena	1,400
Turan	Tovuz	Tovuz City Stadium	6,800
Zaqatala	Zaqatala	Zaqatala City Stadium	3,500
Zira-2	Baku	AZAL Arena	3,500

== Table ==
Pos	Team	Pld	W	D	L	GF	GA	GD	Pts
1	Turan Tovuz	17	12	1	4	29	18	+11	37
2	Sabail-2	18	10	6	2	30	11	+19	36
3	Zagatala	17	11	2	4	36	16	+20	35
4	Sabah-2	18	10	2	6	29	19	+10	32
5	Neftçi-2	18	8	5	5	27	15	+12	29
6	Kapaz	18	8	4	6	23	19	+4	28
7	Keşla-2	17	7	4	6	28	22	+6	25
8	Sumgayit-2	17	7	3	7	19	24	−5	24
9	Qarabağ-2	17	7	3	7	36	21	+15	24
10	MOIK Baku	16	5	4	7	19	22	−3	19
11	Ağsu	18	4	1	13	13	45	−32	13
12	Zira-2	17	3	2	12	18	41	−23	11
13	Qaradağ Lökbatan	18	2	1	15	10	44	−34	7

Updated to match(es) played on 8 November 2019. Source:
