= 2013–14 Azerbaijan First Division =

Azerbaijan First Division
- Season: 2013–14
- Matches: 198
- Goals: 548 (2.77 per match)
- Biggest home win: Neftchala 8–0 Energetik
- Biggest away win: Energetik 0–6 Neftchala
- Highest scoring: Turan-T 6–2 Lokomotiv-Bilajary; Neftchala 8–0 Energetik
- Longest winning run: 10 games Araz
- Longest unbeaten run: 13 games Araz, Qaradağ
- Longest losing run: 10 games Göyəzən

The 2013–14 Azerbaijan First Division is the second-level of football in Azerbaijan. The season was started on 10 September 2013 and there were sixteen teams participating in the league. Ağsu were the defending champions.

== Teams ==
Turan-T were relegated for the first time in their history, after twenty years in Azerbaijan Premier League, the longest period in its history. On 21 August 2013, it was announced that Araz and Karvan after reformation will join the first division, while Qala and Taraggi will not participate after becoming defunct.

On 10 September 2013, Mil-Muğan also joined the league, while Turan's name changed to Turan-T.

=== Stadia and locations ===
Note: Table lists in alphabetical order.

Location of teams in 2013-14 Azerbaijan First Division

Team	Location	Stadium	Stadium capacity
Ağsu	Agsu	Agsu City Stadium	3,000
Araz	Nakhchivan	Nakhchivan City Stadium	12,800
Bakılı	Baku	Zirə Olympic Sport Complex Stadium	1,500
Energetik	Mingachevir	Yashar Mammadzade Stadium	5,000
Göyəzən	Qazakh	Qazakh City Stadium	15,000
Karvan	Yevlakh	Yevlakh Stadium	5,000
Kəpəz	Ganja	Ganja City Stadium	25,000
Lokomotiv	Baku	FC Baku stadium	3,000
Mil-Muğan	Imishli	Heydar Aliyev Stadium	8,500
MOIK	Baku	MOIK Stadium	3,000
Neftçala	Neftchala	Nariman Narimanov Stadium	2,000
Qaradağ	Lökbatan	Lökbatan Olympic Sport Complex Stadium	2,000
Şahdağ	Qusar	Şövkət Orduxanov Stadium	4,000
Şəmkir	Şəmkir	Shamkir City Stadium	11,500
Şuşa	Shusha	Shafa Stadium	8,000
Turan-T	Tovuz	Tovuz City Stadium	6,800

=== Personnel and kits ===
Note: Flags indicate national team as has been defined under FIFA eligibility rules. Players may hold more than one non-FIFA nationality.

Team	Manager	Team captain	Kit manufacturer	Shirt sponsor
Ağsu	(Azerbaijan) Rufat Guliyev	TBD	Umbro	Aqua Vita
Araz	(Azerbaijan) Asgar Abdullayev	TBD	Lescon	
Bakılı	(Azerbaijan) Rakif Aliyev	TBD		
Energetik	(Azerbaijan) Sahib Gojayev	TBD		
Göyəzən	(Azerbaijan) Mehdi Salmanov	TBD		
Karvan	(Azerbaijan) Kanan Karimov	TBD		
Kəpəz	(Azerbaijan) Vidadi Rzayev	TBD		
Lokomotiv	(Azerbaijan) İlgar Huseynov	TBD		
Mil-Muğan	(Azerbaijan) Matlab Mammadov	TBD		
MOIK	(Azerbaijan) Namig Adilov	TBD		
Neftçala	(Azerbaijan) Bahram Shahguliyev	TBD	Lescon	SOCAR Petroleum
Qaradağ	(Azerbaijan) Adil Mahmudov	TBD	Lescon	SOCAR
Şahdağ	(Azerbaijan) Kamran Alibabayev	TBD	Lescon	AZENCO
Şəmkir	(Azerbaijan) Ruslan Abbasov	TBD		
Şuşa	(Azerbaijan) Nadir Gasymov	(Azerbaijan) Emin Mollayev		
Turan-T	(Azerbaijan) Rasim Aliyev	(Azerbaijan) Asef Gadiri		

== League table ==
Pos	Team	Pld	W	D	L	GF	GA	GD	Pts	Promotion
1	Araz-Naxçıvan (C, P)	30	25	4	1	66	11	+55	79	Promotion to Azerbaijan Premier League
2	Neftchala	30	21	5	4	80	22	+58	68	
3	Qaradağ	30	18	9	3	52	14	+38	63	
4	Ağsu	30	17	7	6	56	26	+30	58	
5	Şahdağ	30	16	7	7	55	22	+33	55	
6	Şuşa	30	15	9	6	60	26	+34	54	
7	Turan-T	30	13	5	12	52	46	+6	44	
8	Karvan	30	12	6	12	46	56	−10	42	
9	Mil-Muğan	30	11	7	12	29	33	−4	40	
10	Lokomotiv-Bilajary	30	12	3	15	42	58	−16	39	
11	Şəmkir	30	8	7	15	28	42	−14	31	
12	MOIK Baku	30	7	8	15	37	56	−19	29	
13	Kapaz	30	7	4	19	29	37	−8	25	
14	Bakili	30	6	6	18	34	60	−26	24	
15	Energetik	30	2	5	23	11	92	−81	11	
16	Göyəzən	30	3	2	25	13	89	−76	11	

Source: Azerbaijan Professional Football league
Rules for classification: 1) points; 2) goal difference; 3) number of goals scored.
(C) Champions; (P) Promoted

=== Results ===
Home \ Away	AGU	ARZ	BKL	ENG	ATM	KAR	KAP	LBA	MM	MOI	NEF	QAD	ABB	SHA	SHU	TUR
Ağsu		0–1	2–1	4–1	5–0	3–2	0–5	5–0	2–0	1–1	3–2	0–1	1–0	0–0	0–0	7–1
Araz-Naxçıvan	1–0		4–0	9–0	4–0	3–1	1–0	3–0	3–0	3–0	1–1	1–0	3–1	3–1	1–0	1–0
Bakili	1–3	0–1		2–3	3–1	0–1	2–1	1–1	0–2	0–0	3–5	1–1	1–4	2–1	0–2	3–1
Energetik	0–2	1–4	0–2		1–2	0–3	0–4	0–3	2–0	0–0	0–6	0–2	1–2	0–3	0–2	0–5
Göyəzən	1–6	0–4	0–3	1–1		0–4	0–1	1–3	0–2	3–1	0–1	0–3	0–4	0–1	2–1	0–3
Karvan	0–0	1–3	4–3	1–1	3–1		2–1	2–1	2–0	5–5	0–6	0–1	0–1	1–0	1–1	2–0
Kapaz	0–1	0–1	3–0	0–0	1–1	0–1		0–1	2–0	3–1	0–3	0–1	0–1	2–0	0–1	0–0
Lokomotiv-Bilajary	0–1	1–3	3–0	4–0	3–0	2–5	3–2		1–1	2–1	1–0	0–4	1–1	2–0	2–5	3–1
Mil-Muğan	0–2	0–0	3–1	3–0	2–0	1–0	2–1	0–1		2–0	1–1	0–0	0–0	3–1	2–5	2–2
MOIK Baku	0–3	0–1	2–2	0–0	3–0	3–3	1–0	1–0	2–1		1–5	1–2	0–1	2–2	2–4	4–0
Neftchala	0–1	1–0	2–0	8–0	6–0	7–0	4–0	2–1	1–0	4–0		2–1	1–0	1–0	3–2	0–1
Qaradağ	2–2	0–0	1–0	3–0	3–0	3–0	3–0	4–0	3–0	2–0	1–1		0–0	3–0	0–0	0–0
Şahdağ	1–1	0–2	3–0	5–0	6–0	5–0	2–0	4–0	0–1	2–1	2–3	3–3		2–0	1–1	1–0
Şəmkir	1–1	1–2	1–1	4–0	2–0	1–0	1–1	2–0	1–1	1–3	0–0	1–0	1–0		1–3	0–2
Şuşa	1–0	1–1	4–1	5–0	6–0	1–1	2–1	3–1	3–0	0–1	1–1	2–3	0–0	4–0		2–2
Turan-T	3–0	1–2	1–1	3–0	3–0	3–1	2–1	6–2	2–1	4–1	2–3	0–2	1–3	3–1	0–3	

Source: Soccerway: Birinci Dasta Table
Legend: Blue = home team win; Yellow = draw; Red = away team win.

== Season statistics ==
=== Top scorers ===
As of Match played 13 April 2014

Rank	Player	Club	Goals
1	(Azerbaijan) Ali Bagirov	Karvan	25
2	(Georgia (country)) David Janalidze	Araz	24
3	(Azerbaijan) Muhammad Badalbeyli	MOIK Baku	20
4	(Azerbaijan) Sarhan Agayev	Şahdağ	18
5	(Azerbaijan) Elvin Adisirinli	Shusha	17
6	(Azerbaijan) Rashad Piriyev	Turan-T	14
7	(Azerbaijan) Jeyhun Abdullayev	Neftchala	12
8	(Azerbaijan) Qalib Amrahov	Ağsu	11
9	(Azerbaijan) Ali Babayev Banishevskiy	Shusha	9

=== Hat-tricks ===
Player	For	Against	Result	Date
(Azerbaijan) Farmayil Aliyev	Turan-T	Lokomotiv-Bilajary	6–2	12 October 2013
(Azerbaijan) Muhammad Aliyev	Neftchala	MOIK Baku	5–5	12 October 2013
(Azerbaijan) Jeyhun Abdullayev	Neftchala	Energetik	6–0	1 November 2013
(Nigeria) Ahmad Tijani	Şuşa	Turan-T	3–0	9 November 2013
(Azerbaijan) Tural Gurbatov	Lokomotiv-Bilajary	Kəpəz	3–2	16 November 2013
(Azerbaijan) Elvin Adisirinli	Şuşa	Göyəzən	6–0	30 November 2013
(Azerbaijan) Mehdi Mehdiyev	Kəpəz	MOIK Baku	3–1	8 December 2013
(Azerbaijan) Elvin Adısirinli	Şuşa	Lokomotiv-Bilajary	5–2	21 December 2013
(Azerbaijan) Sarhan Agayev^{5}	Şahdağ	Göyəzən	6–0	8 February 2014
(Azerbaijan) Ali Bagirov	Karvan	Lokomotiv-Bilajary	5–2	8 February 2014
(Azerbaijan) Ali Bagirov	Karvan	Göyəzən	4–0	9 March 2014
(Azerbaijan) Qalib Amrahov	Agsu	Göyəzən	6–1	5 April 2014

- ^{5} Player scored 5 goals
