= 2008–09 Azerbaijan First Division =

Azerbaijan First Division
- Season: 2008–09
- Champions: ABN Bärdä
- Promoted: N/A
- Matches played: 112
- Goals scored: 332 (2.96 per match)

The 2008–09 Azerbaijan First Division is the second-level of football in Azerbaijan. The season started on 6 September 2009 with eight teams participating in the league. NBC Salyan were the defending champions.

ABN Bärdä won the league, with Shahdag finishing as runners up. Both teams were due to be promoted to the Azerbaijan Premier League, but due to the AFFA's license policy, neither teams were.

== Schedule ==
Each team played each other four times, twice at home and twice away, with the season started on 6 September 2008 and finished on 16 May 2009. There were no games between 7 December 2008 and 15 February 2009, due to the annual winter break.

== Teams ==
Location of teams in Azerbaijan Premier League 2008-09

=== Stadia and locations ===
Note: Table lists in alphabetical order.

| Team | Location | Venue | Capacity |
|---|---|---|---|
| ABN Bärdä | Barda | Barda City Stadium | 10,000 |
| Adliyya Baku | Baku | Adliyya Stadium | 7,000 |
| Energetik | Mingachevir | Yashar Mammadzade Stadium | 5,000 |
| Göyazan | Qazax | Qazakh City Stadium | 3,500 |
| ANSAD-Petrol Neftçala | Neftçala | Nariman Narimanov Stadium | 4,000 |
| Qafqaz University | Baku | | |
| Shahdag | Qusar | Shovkat Ordukhanov Stadium | 4,000 |
| Spartak Guba | Quba | Quba City Stadium | 2,000 |

== League table ==
| Pos | Team | Pld | W | D | L | GF | GA | GD | Pts |
|---|---|---|---|---|---|---|---|---|---|
| 1 | ABN Bärdä (C) | 28 | 15 | 6 | 7 | 46 | 39 | +7 | 51 |
| 2 | Şahdağ | 28 | 14 | 9 | 5 | 48 | 29 | +19 | 51 |
| 3 | ANSAD-Petrol Neftçala | 28 | 15 | 6 | 7 | 50 | 31 | +19 | 51 |
| 4 | Energetik | 28 | 14 | 8 | 6 | 51 | 29 | +22 | 50 |
| 5 | Qafqaz University | 28 | 10 | 7 | 11 | 41 | 43 | −2 | 37 |
| 6 | Adliyya Baku | 28 | 10 | 5 | 13 | 47 | 45 | +2 | 35 |
| 7 | Göyəzən | 28 | 6 | 4 | 18 | 29 | 56 | −27 | 22 |
| 8 | Spartak Guba | 28 | 3 | 5 | 20 | 20 | 69 | −49 | 14 |

Source: Pfl.az
Rules for classification: 1) points; 2) goal difference; 3) number of goals scored.
(C) Champions

== Top goalscorers ==
Last updated: 17 May 2009; Source: www.football-plus.az (in Azerbaijani)

15 goals

- (Azerbaijan) Vasif Aliyev (ANSAD-Petrol)
- (Azerbaijan) Zahid Talibov (FK Shahdag)

14 goals

- (Azerbaijan) Bahruz Ismayilov (Qafqaz University FK)

== See also ==
- 2008–09 Azerbaijan Premier League
- 2008–09 Azerbaijan Cup
