= 2014–15 Azerbaijan First Division =

Azerbaijan First Division
- Season: 2014–15
- Champions: Neftchala

The 2014–15 Azerbaijan First Division is the second-level of football in Azerbaijan. Araz were the defending champions. The season started on 6 September 2014 and there were sixteen teams participating in the league.

== Teams ==
Araz were promoted to Azerbaijan Premier League, while Ravan Baku relegated to Azerbaijan First Division. In July 2014, it was confirmed that Zira FK will participate in the first division.

=== Stadia and locations ===
Note: Table lists in alphabetical order.

Location of teams in 2014-15 Azerbaijan First Division

Team	Location	Stadium	Stadium capacity
Ağsu	Agsu	Agsu City Stadium	3,000
Bakılı	Baku	Zirə Olympic Sport Complex Stadium	1,500
Energetik	Mingachevir	Yashar Mammadzade Stadium	5,000
Göyəzən	Qazakh	Qazakh City Stadium	15,000
Kəpəz	Ganja	Ganja City Stadium	25,000
Lokomotiv-Bilajary	Baku	FC Baku stadium	3,000
Mil-Muğan	Imishli	Heydar Aliyev Stadium	8,500
MOIK	Baku	MOIK Stadium	3,000
Neftçala	Neftchala	Nariman Narimanov Stadium	2,000
Qaradağ Lökbatan	Lökbatan	Lökbatan Olympic Sport Complex Stadium	2,000
Ravan	Baku	Bayil Stadium	5,000
Şahdağ	Qusar	Şövkət Orduxanov Stadium	4,000
Şəmkir	Şəmkir	Shamkir City Stadium	11,500
Şuşa	Shusha	Shafa Stadium	8,000
Turan	Tovuz	Tovuz City Stadium	6,800
Zira	Baku	Zirə Olympic Sport Complex Stadium	1,500

=== Personnel and kits ===
Note: Flags indicate national team as has been defined under FIFA eligibility rules. Players may hold more than one non-FIFA nationality.

Team	Manager	Team captain	Kit manufacturer	Shirt sponsor
Ağsu	(Azerbaijan) Rufat Guliyev	TBD	Umbro	Aqua Vita
Bakılı	(Azerbaijan) Rafik Aliyev	TBD	TBD	TBD
Energetik	(Azerbaijan) Sahib Gojayev	TBD		
Göyəzən	(Azerbaijan) Elxan Muradov	TBD		
Kəpəz	(Azerbaijan) Vidadi Rzayev	TBD	TBD	TBD
Lokomotiv-Bilajary	(Azerbaijan) İlgar Huseynov	TBD		
Mil-Muğan	(Azerbaijan) Matlab Mammadov	TBD	TBD	TBD
MOIK	(Azerbaijan) Namig Adilov	TBD	Kappa	
Neftçala	(Azerbaijan) Kamal Guliyev	TBD	Lescon	SOCAR Petroleum
Qaradağ Lökbatan	(Azerbaijan) Adil Mahmudov	TBD	Lescon	SOCAR
Ravan	(Azerbaijan) Ramil Aliyev	TBD	TBD	TBD
Şahdağ	(Azerbaijan) Telman Javadov	TBD	TBD	TBD
Şəmkir	(Azerbaijan) Ruslan Abbasov	(Azerbaijan) Orxan Məmmədov	TBD	TBD
Şuşa	(Azerbaijan) Nadir Gasymov	TBD	TBD	
Turan	(Azerbaijan) Badri Kvaratskhelia	(Azerbaijan) Asef Gadiri	TBD	TBD
Zira	(Azerbaijan) Bahram Shahguliyev	TBD	Umbro	Kapital Bank

=== Managerial changes ===
Team	Outgoing manager	Manner of departure	Date of vacancy	Position in table	Incoming manager	Date of appointment
Şahdağ	(Azerbaijan) Kamran Alibabayev	Resigned	20 October 2014	13th	(Azerbaijan) Telman Javadov	20 October 2014

== League table ==
Pos	Team	Pld	W	D	L	GF	GA	GD	Pts	Promotion
1	Neftchala	30	25	3	2	83	19	+64	78	
2	Ağsu	30	21	4	5	70	22	+48	67	
3	Ravan Baku (P)	30	21	4	5	70	22	+48	67	Promotion to Azerbaijan Premier League
4	Qaradağ Lökbatan	30	20	5	5	57	25	+32	65	
5	Zira (P)	30	19	6	5	61	19	+42	63	Promotion to Azerbaijan Premier League
6	Turan Tovuz	30	15	5	10	75	37	+38	50	
7	Şahdağ	30	13	8	9	40	29	+11	47	
8	Şuşa Qarabağ	30	14	4	12	49	31	+18	46	
9	Kəpəz (P)	30	10	8	12	37	37	0	38	Promotion to Azerbaijan Premier League
10	Bakili	30	10	4	16	46	61	−15	34	
11	Şəmkir	30	8	8	14	25	46	−21	32	
12	MOIK Baku	30	8	5	17	26	60	−34	29	
13	Mil-Muğan	30	7	5	18	30	65	−35	26	
14	Energetik	30	5	3	22	24	82	−58	18	
15	Göyəzən	30	3	3	24	15	91	−76	12	
16	Lokomotiv-Bilajary	30	3	1	26	10	72	−62	10	

Source: soccerway.com
Rules for classification: 1) points; 2) head-to-head points; 3) head-to-head goal difference; 4) head-to-head goals scored; 5. head-to-head away goals (only if 2 teams are tied); 6) goal difference; 7) goals scored.
(P) Promoted

=== Results ===
Home \ Away	AGU	ZIR	BKL	ENG	ATM	RAV	KAP	LBA	ARZ	MOI	NEF	QAD	ABB	SHA	SHU	TUR
Ağsu		0–2	7–1	5–0	4–0	1–1	1–0	3–0	4–0	5–0	1–4	0–1	2–1	5–0	1–0	1–1
Zira	1–1		3–1	6–0	5–0	2–0	3–0	3–0	5–1	1–0	1–3	1–1	3–0	0–0	0–2	0–1
Bakili	0–2	0–1		7–1	2–1	0–2	2–1	3–0	2–2	0–0	0–2	1–3	0–0	5–1	2–3	1–8
Energetik	0–3	0–1	3–1		4–0	0–3	1–1	3–0	3–0	1–1	1–4	0–4	0–6	2–2	0–3	1–2
Göyəzən	0–2	0–6	0–4	3–1		0–4	0–3	0–4	0–0	0–1	0–6	0–3	1–3	0–2	0–0	0–5
Ravan Baku	0–1	3–1	5–1	3–1	4–0		4–1	3–0	3–0	6–0	1–3	1–1	1–0	6–0	1–0	2–1
Kapaz	2–3	1–1	2–0	0–1	2–0	0–0		3–0	3–0	4–0	1–4	1–1	0–0	0–0	1–0	1–0
Lokomotiv-Bilajary	0–3	0–3	0–3	1–0	0–3	0–1	1–3		3–2	0–3	0–2	0–3	0–3	0–1	0–0	0–3
Mil-Muğan	0–0	1–3	0–4	3–1	0–3	1–2	3–0	3–0		1–0	0–2	1–0	0–3	1–1	1–4	0–3
MOIK Baku	1–6	0–2	3–1	3–0	2–2	0–6	1–1	1–0	0–4		1–4	0–3	0–1	1–2	3–1	1–4
Neftchala	2–0	0–0	6–0	3–0	2–0	3–0	3–0	3–0	3–0	1–0		4–5	4–0	2–0	3–2	4–1
Qaradağ	3–0	0–2	2–1	2–0	5–0	1–3	1–0	1–0	2–1	0–1	2–3		1–0	1–0	1–0	3–1
Şahdağ	0–2	0–1	0–0	4–0	3–0	1–0	1–1	3–1	1–1	3–1	1–1	0–0		1–0	1–0	3–2
Şəmkir	0–2	0–1	1–0	1–0	3–0	1–2	1–0	3–0	1–2	0–2	0–0	0–2	1–1		1–4	0–3
Şuşa	1–2	2–1	1–2	5–0	5–0	2–3	1–2	3–0	3–2	1–0	0–1	1–1	1–0	2–2		1–0
Turan-T	1–3	2–2	1–2	5–0	6–2	0–0	4–3	4–0	6–0	0–0	2–1	3–4	5–0	1–1	0–1	

Source: Soccerway: Birinci Dasta Table
Legend: Blue = home team win; Yellow = draw; Red = away team win.

== Season statistics ==
=== Top scorers ===
Rank	Player	Club	Goals
1	(Azerbaijan) İlham Allahverdiyev	Qaradağ Lökbatan	21
2	(Azerbaijan) Fərmayıl Əliyev	Neftchala	16
3	(Azerbaijan) Məhəmməd Alıyev	Nefchala	15

=== Hat-tricks ===
Player	For	Against	Result	Date
(Azerbaijan) Elxan Məmmədov	Mil-Muğan	Göyəzən	6–1	6 September 2014
(Azerbaijan) Rəşad Piriyev	Göyəzən	Lokomotiv B	0–4	25 September 2014
(Iran) Morteza Heydari	Şuşa	Göyəzən	5–0	16 October 2014
(Azerbaijan) Akif Tağıyev	Göyəzən	Turan Tovuz	0–5	31 October 2014
(Azerbaijan) Aqşin Sadıqov	Turan Tovuz	Şahdağ	5–0	27 November 2014
(Azerbaijan) Röyal Nəcəfov	MOİK	Bakılı	3–1	28 November 2014
(Iran) Morteza Heydari	Şuşa	Energetik	5–0	28 November 2014
(Azerbaijan) Zeynal Hacıyev	Şahdağ	Energetik	4–0	8 December 2014
(Azerbaijan) Tuqay Alhüseynli	Turan Tovuz	Göyəzən	6–2	21 February 2015
(Azerbaijan) Əli Bağırov	Rəvan	Bakılı	5–1	16 March 2015
(Azerbaijan) Aslan Hüseynov	Zirə	Energetik	6–0	23 March 2015
(Azerbaijan) Fərmayıl Əliyev	Kəpəz	Neftchala	1–4	28 March 2015
(Azerbaijan) Malik Babayev	Ağsu	Bakılı	7–1	3 April 2015
(Georgia (country)) David Janelidze	Neftchala	Bakılı	6–0	18 April 2015
(Azerbaijan) Samir Babayev	Mil-Muğan	Energetik	3–1	30 April 2015
(Azerbaijan) Aqşin Sadıqov	Bakılı	Turan Tovuz	1–8	15 May 2015
(Azerbaijan) Qalib Əmrahov	Ağsu	Göyəzən	4–0	15 May 2015
(Azerbaijan) Elnur Abdulov	Göyəzən	Zirə	0–6	23 May 2015
(Azerbaijan) Sabir Allahquliyev	Neftchala	Qaradağ Lökbatan	4–5	27 May 2015

=== Poker ===
Player	For	Against	Result	Date
(Azerbaijan) Rəhman Musayev	Bakılı	Energetik	7–1	19 September 2014
(Azerbaijan) İlham Allahverdiyev	Qaradağ Lökbatan	Göyəzən	5–0	7 March 2015

=== Penta-trick ===
Player	For	Against	Result	Date
(Azerbaijan) Tuqay Alhüseynli	Turan Tovuz	Energetik	5–0	27 May 2015
