= 2005–06 Azerbaijan First Division =

Football league season

Azerbaijan First Division
- Season: 2005–06
- Champions: Gilan
- Promoted: Gilan; Simurq

In the 2005–06 season, the Azerbaijan First Division (the second tier of professional football in Azerbaijan) was contested by 16 teams. The winning team was Gilan (a.k.a. Gabala).

== League table ==
| Pos | Team | Pld | W | D | L | GF | GA | GD | Pts | Promotion |
|---|---|---|---|---|---|---|---|---|---|---|
| 1 | Gilan (C, P) | 30 | 22 | 6 | 2 | 72 | 14 | +58 | 72 | Promotion to Azerbaijan Top League |
| 2 | Khazar II | 30 | 22 | 3 | 5 | 60 | 18 | +42 | 69 | |
| 3 | Simurq (P) | 30 | 20 | 7 | 3 | 70 | 14 | +56 | 67 | Promotion to Azerbaijan Top League |
| 4 | ANSAD-Petrol Neftçala | 30 | 20 | 2 | 8 | 56 | 30 | +26 | 62 | |
| 5 | Bakili | 30 | 16 | 8 | 6 | 32 | 23 | +9 | 56 | |
| 6 | Adliyya Baku | 30 | 16 | 8 | 6 | 63 | 30 | +33 | 56 | |
| 7 | ABN Bärdä | 30 | 13 | 9 | 8 | 50 | 30 | +20 | 48 | |
| 8 | Rote Fahne | 30 | 13 | 6 | 11 | 49 | 46 | +3 | 45 | |
| 9 | Neftchi II | 30 | 12 | 4 | 14 | 29 | 34 | −5 | 40 | |
| 10 | Energetik | 30 | 10 | 5 | 15 | 41 | 52 | −11 | 35 | |
| 11 | Gänclärbirliyi Sumqayit II | 30 | 8 | 5 | 17 | 35 | 53 | −18 | 29 | |
| 12 | Shahdag II | 30 | 6 | 10 | 14 | 37 | 80 | −43 | 28 | |
| 13 | Azerbaijan U-17 | 30 | 6 | 4 | 20 | 33 | 52 | −19 | 22 | |
| 14 | Yeni Yevlakh | 30 | 5 | 6 | 19 | 26 | 54 | −28 | 21 | |
| 15 | Vilash | 30 | 4 | 6 | 20 | 30 | 71 | −41 | 18 | |
| 16 | Sharur | 30 | 2 | 1 | 27 | 12 | 94 | −82 | 7 | |

Source: PFL and rsssf.com
Rules for classification: 1) points; 2) goal difference; 3) number of goals scored.
(C) Champions; (P) Promoted
