= 2018–19 Azerbaijan First Division =

Azerbaijan First Division
- Season: 2018–19

The 2018–19 Azerbaijan First Division is the second-level of football in Azerbaijan. Sabail-2 were the defending champions.

== Teams ==
Sabah was promoted from the 2017–18 season to Azerbaijan Premier League, while Kapaz relegated to the First Division.

On 9 August 2018, it was announced that Keşla-2, Neftçi-2, Qarabağ-2, Sabah-2, Sabail-2, Sumgayit-2 and Zira-2 will participate in the First Division.

Bine, Khazar and Mil-Muğan didn't participate in this season.

Team	Location	Venue	Capacity
Ağsu	Agsu	Agsu City Stadium	3,000
Kapaz	Ganja	Ganja City Stadium	25,000
Keşla-2	Keshla	ASK Arena	8,125
MOIK Baku	Baku	Lökbatan Olympic Sport Complex Stadium	2,500
Neftçi-2	Baku	ASK Arena	8,125
Qarabağ-2	Aghdam	Azersun Arena	5,800
Qaradağ Lökbatan	Lökbatan	Lökbatan Olympic Sport Complex Stadium	2,500
Sabah-2	Baku	Bine Stadium	800
Sabail-2	Səbail	Bayil Arena	5,000
Shuvalan	Shuvalan	AZAL Arena	3,500
Sumgayit-2	Sumqayit	Kapital Bank Arena	1,500
Turan	Tovuz	Tovuz City Stadium	6,800
Zaqatala	Zaqatala	Zaqatala City Stadium	3,500
Zira-2	Baku	Zira Olympic Sport Complex Stadium	1,400

== Table ==
Pos	Team	Pld	W	D	L	GF	GA	GD	Pts
1	MOIK Baku (Note: MOIK Baku failed to get license for promotion)	26	21	2	3	51	21	+30	65
2	Sumgayit-2	26	19	2	5	68	29	+39	59
3	Neftçi-2	26	16	4	6	51	28	+23	52
4	Zagatala	26	13	8	5	51	30	+21	47
5	Qarabağ-2	26	14	3	9	51	35	+16	45
6	Keşla-2	26	12	4	10	41	32	+9	40
7	Shuvalan	26	11	7	8	31	25	+6	40
8	Sabah-2	26	11	5	10	27	20	+7	38
9	Qaradağ Lökbatan	26	9	3	14	24	39	−15	30
10	Sabail-2	26	8	3	15	37	57	−20	27
11	Kapaz	26	5	7	14	21	40	−19	22
12	Turan Tovuz	26	6	2	18	29	54	−25	20
13	Ağsu	26	4	5	17	24	62	−38	17
14	Zira-2	26	5	1	20	23	57	−34	16

Source: PFL

== Season statistics ==
=== Top scorers ===
Rank	Player	Club	Goals
1	(Azerbaijan) Javad Kazimov	Zagatala	23
2	(Azerbaijan) Raul Yagubzade	MOIK Baku	22
3	(Azerbaijan) Elnur Suleymanov	Neftçi-2	15
4	(Azerbaijan) Ibrahim Aliyev	Sumgayit-2	11
4	(Azerbaijan) Musa Gurbanli	Qarabağ-2	11
