= 2015–16 Azerbaijan First Division =

Football league season

Azerbaijan First Division
- Season: 2015–16
- Matches: 91
- Goals: 267 (2.93 per match)
- Biggest home win: Bakili 7–2 Energetik
- Biggest away win: Energetik 0–12 Neftchala
- Highest scoring: Energetik 0–12 Neftchala

The 2015–16 Azerbaijan First Division is the second-level of football in Azerbaijan. Neftchala were the defending champions.

== Teams ==
Kapaz, Ravan Baku and Zira were promoted to Azerbaijan Premier League, while Baku relegated to Azerbaijan First Division. Shusha and Lokomotiv-Bilajary were dissolved.

=== Stadia and locations ===
Note: Table lists in alphabetical order.

Location of teams in 2015-16 Azerbaijan First Division

Team	Location	Stadium	Stadium capacity
Ağsu	Agsu	Agsu City Stadium	3,000
Bakılı	Baku	Zirə Olympic Sport Complex Stadium	1,500
Baku	Baku	FC Baku's Training Base	2,000
Energetik	Mingachevir	Yashar Mammadzade Stadium	5,000
Göyəzən	Qazakh	Qazakh City Stadium	15,000
Mil-Muğan	Imishli	Heydar Aliyev Stadium	8,500
MOIK	Baku	MOIK Stadium	3,000
Neftçala	Neftchala	Nariman Narimanov Stadium	2,000
Qaradağ Lökbatan	Lökbatan	Lökbatan Olympic Sport Complex Stadium	2,000
Şərurspor	Baku	Bayil Stadium	5,000
Şahdağ	Qusar	Şövkət Orduxanov Stadium	4,000
Şəmkir	Şəmkir	Shamkir City Stadium	11,500
Turan	Tovuz	Tovuz City Stadium	6,800
Zaqatala	Zaqatala	Zaqatala City Stadium	3,500

== League table ==
Pos	Team	Pld	W	D	L	GF	GA	GD	Pts	Promotion
1	Neftchala (C)	26	20	2	4	74	20	+54	62	Promotion to Azerbaijan Premier League
2	Qaradağ Lökbatan	26	18	4	4	59	28	+31	58	
3	Ağsu	26	13	8	5	46	29	+17	47	
4	MOIK Baku	26	14	5	7	53	24	+29	47	
5	Şəmkir	26	10	8	8	30	24	+6	38	
6	Zaqatala	26	9	9	8	47	36	+11	36	
7	Turan Tovuz	26	10	6	10	35	31	+4	36	
8	Mil-Muğan	26	8	8	10	28	26	+2	32	
9	Bakili	26	8	6	12	34	46	−12	30	
10	Şahdağ	26	8	6	12	31	54	−23	30	
11	Baku	26	9	3	14	33	42	−9	30	
12	Şərurspor	26	8	4	14	45	44	+1	28	
13	Göyəzən	26	3	8	15	17	42	−25	17	
14	Energetik	26	4	3	19	14	100	−86	15	

Source: soccerway.com
Rules for classification: 1) points; 2) head-to-head points; 3) head-to-head goal difference; 4) head-to-head goals scored; 5. head-to-head away goals (only if 2 teams are tied); 6) goal difference; 7) goals scored.
(C) Champions

=== Results ===
Home \ Away	AGU	BKL	BAK	ENG	ATM	ARZ	MOI	NEF	QAD	SER	ABB	SHA	TUR	ZAG
Ağsu		1–0	3–0	3–0	2–1	2–0	1–0	1–1	3–2	2–3	4–1	1–1	0–0	1–1
Bakili	2–1		3–1	7–2	2–2	0–2	1–5	1–5	0–2	0–1	4–1	2–2	2–1	3–1
Baku	2–3	3–0		1–2	1–1	4–0	1–0	1–4	0–2	2–1	3–0	0–0	2–1	0–3
Energetik	0–4	0–0	3–1		1–2	0–4	1–5	0–12	0–5	0–4	1–0	1–0	0–4	1–1
Göyəzən	0–0	3–1	0–0	0–0		0–0	1–2	0–0	0–2	0–5	0–2	0–1	1–2	1–1
Mil-Muğan	1–2	2–0	3–1	4–1	3–1		2–1	0–1	1–1	2–0	0–1	0–2	1–2	0–0
MOIK Baku	0–2	1–2	4–0	4–1	4–0	1–1		2–0	1–1	1–0	9–1	2–1	0–0	2–2
Neftchala	5–2	4–1	2–0	10–0	2–0	1–0	1–0		2–0	3–0	4–0	1–0	0–1	3–1
Qaradağ	3–3	0–0	1–3	7–0	3–0	1–0	2–0	3–1		3–2	1–0	5–2	4–1	2–1
Şərurspor	2–1	0–1	0–2	6–0	0–3	1–1	0–3	1–4	2–3		5–1	1–2	0–1	1–2
Şahdağ	1–1	2–1	2–1	2–0	1–0	1–1	1–1	4–3	4–1	0–3		1–2	1–3	1–1
Şəmkir	1–0	0–0	2–1	3–0	1–0	0–0	1–2	0–1	0–1	1–1	2–2		3–0	1–1
Turan-T	1–2	1–1	1–0	5–0	3–0	0–0	1–2	1–2	1–2	1–1	1–1	1–0		0–1
Zaqatala	1–1	3–1	1–3	6–0	4–1	2–0	0–1	1–2	1–2	5–5	2–0	0–2	5–2	

Source: Birinci Dasta Table
Legend: Blue = home team win; Yellow = draw; Red = away team win.

== Season statistics ==
=== Top scorers ===
Rank	Player	Club	Goals
1	(Azerbaijan) Röyal Nəcəfov	MOİK	24
2	(Georgia (country)) David Janelidze	Nefchala	21
3	(Azerbaijan) Oruc Balaşlı	Zaqatala	18
4	(Azerbaijan) Rahman Musayev	Şərurspor	16

=== Six Goals ===
Player	For	Against	Result	Date
(Azerbaijan) Röyal Nəcəfov	MOİK	Şahdağ	9–1	13 May 2016

=== Penta-trick ===
Player	For	Against	Result	Date
(Georgia (country)) David Janelidze	Neftchala	Energetik	10–0	13 May 2016

=== Poker ===
Player	For	Against	Result	Date
(Azerbaijan) Röyal Nəcəfov	Energetik	MOİK	1–5	18 March 2016

=== Hat-tricks ===
Player	For	Against	Result	Date
(Azerbaijan) Farmayil Aliyev	Neftchala	Energetik	12–0	11 September 2015
(Georgia (country)) David Janelidze	Neftchala	Energetik	12–0	11 September 2015
(Azerbaijan) Ulvi Guliyev	Bakılı	Energetik	7–2	18 September 2015
(Azerbaijan) Rahman Musayev	Şərurspor	Göyəzən	5–0	24 September 2015
(Azerbaijan) Rahman Musayev	Şərurspor	Energetik	6–0	1 October 2015
(Azerbaijan) Ali Bagirov	Ağsu	Şahdağ	4–1	22 October 2015
(Iran) Sajjad Kerman	Mil-Muğan	Energetik	4–0	13 November 2015
(Azerbaijan) Cavid Mukhtarzade	Qaradağ	Şahdağ	5–2	27 November 2015
(Azerbaijan) Elnur Samedov	Qaradağ	Ağsu	3–3	18 December 2015
(Azerbaijan) Aqşin Həşimov	Şərurspor	Neftchala	1–4	12 March 2016
(Azerbaijan) Elvin Nesibov	Zaqatala	Energetik	6–0	12 March 2016
(Azerbaijan) Valeh Seyidov	Bakı	Mil-Muğan	4–0	15 April 2016
(Azerbaijan) Azər Məmmədov	Turan Tovuz	Energetik	5–0	21 April 2016
