= 2009–10 Azerbaijan First Division =

Azerbaijan First Division
- Season: 2008–09
- Champions: Ganja
- Promoted: MOIK Baku
- Matches played: 132
- Goals scored: 396 (3 per match)

The 2009–10 Azerbaijan First Division, also known as the Birinci Dästä, is the second-level of football in Azerbaijan. Twelve teams participated in Azerbaijani First Division that season. The season began on 5 September 2009 and finished on 16 May 2010.

== Teams ==
Location of teams in Azerbaijan Premier League 2009-10

=== Stadia and locations ===
Note: Table lists in alphabetical order.

| Team | Location | Venue | Capacity |
|---|---|---|---|
| ABN Bärdä | Barda | Barda City Stadium | 10,000 |
| Adliyya Baku | Baku | Adliyya Stadium | 7,000 |
| ANSAD-Petrol Neftçala | Neftçala | Nariman Narimanov Stadium | 4,000 |
| Bakılı | Baku | Shafa Stadium (IV field) | 8,152 |
| Energetik | Mingachevir | Yashar Mammadzade Stadium | 5,000 |
| Ganja | Ganja | Ganja City Stadium | 26,120 |
| Göyazan | Qazax | Qazakh City Stadium | 3,500 |
| MKT-Araz | Imishli | Heydar Aliyev Stadium | 8,500 |
| MOIK Baku | Baku | Shafa Stadium (IV field) | 8,152 |
| Qaradağ | Lökbatan | Lökbatan Olympic Sport Complex Stadium | |
| Ravan Baku | Baku | Bayil Stadium | 5,000 |
| Shahdag | Qusar | Shovkat Ordukhanov Stadium | 4,000 |

== League table ==
| Pos | Team | Pld | W | D | L | GF | GA | GD | Pts | Promotion |
|---|---|---|---|---|---|---|---|---|---|---|
| 1 | Ganja (C, P) | 22 | 14 | 5 | 3 | 51 | 15 | +36 | 47 | Promotion to Azerbaijan Premier League |
| 2 | MOIK Baku (P) | 22 | 15 | 2 | 5 | 48 | 25 | +23 | 47 | Promotion to Azerbaijan Premier League |
| 3 | Bakili | 22 | 14 | 1 | 7 | 41 | 19 | +22 | 43 | |
| 4 | Qaradağ Lökbatan | 22 | 12 | 3 | 7 | 38 | 26 | +12 | 39 | |
| 5 | FK MKT-Araz | 22 | 11 | 5 | 6 | 41 | 29 | +12 | 38 | |
| 6 | Ravan Baku | 22 | 11 | 4 | 7 | 32 | 28 | +4 | 37 | |
| 7 | ABN Bärdä | 22 | 11 | 3 | 8 | 31 | 23 | +8 | 36 | |
| 8 | Şahdağ | 22 | 8 | 8 | 6 | 33 | 24 | +9 | 32 | |
| 9 | ANSAD-Petrol Neftçala | 22 | 5 | 2 | 15 | 25 | 61 | −36 | 17 | |
| 10 | Energetik | 22 | 3 | 6 | 13 | 24 | 51 | −27 | 15 | |
| 11 | Adliyya Baku | 22 | 3 | 5 | 14 | 16 | 40 | −24 | 14 | |
| 12 | Göyəzən | 22 | 1 | 4 | 17 | 16 | 55 | −39 | 7 | |

Source: pfl.az (in Azerbaijani)
Rules for classification: 1) points; 2) goal difference; 3) number of goals scored.
(C) Champions; (P) Promoted

== Top goalscorers ==
Including matches played on 17 May 2010; Source:

14 goals

- (Azerbaijan) Zaur Mammadov (MOIK Baku)
- (Azerbaijan) Ibrahim Huseynov (FK Ganca)

10 goals

- (Azerbaijan) Fuad Aliyev (Bakili Baku)
- (Azerbaijan) Rafig Kochaliyev (MKT Araz)

== See also ==
- 2009–10 Azerbaijan Premier League
- 2009–10 Azerbaijan Cup
