= 2008–09 Azerbaijan Cup =

2008-09 Azerbaijan Cup
Tournament details
- Country: Azerbaijan
- Teams: 18

Final positions
- Champions: Karabakh
- Runners-up: Inter Baku
- UEFA Europa League: Karabakh

Tournament statistics
- Matches played: 33
- Goals scored: 95 (2.88 per match)

The Azerbaijan Cup 2008–09 was the 17th season of the annual cup competition in Azerbaijan. It started on 17 September 2008 with two games of Preliminary Round and ended on 23 May 2009 with the Final held at Tofik Bakhramov Stadium in Baku. Khazar Lenkoran were the defending champions. Eighteen teams compete in this year's competition.

== Preliminary round ==
Four lower division teams, qualified for this competition for unknown reasons, played out two participants who would join the fourteen teams of the Azerbaijan Premier League in the next round. The games were played on September 17 (first legs) and September 24, 2008 (second legs).

Team 1	Agg.	Team 2	1st leg	2nd leg
ABN Bärdä	2–3	Spartak Guba	0–3	2–0
ANSAD-Petrol Neftçala	1–2	Qafqaz Universiteti	1–0	0–2

== Round of 16 ==
The two winners from the preliminary round joined fourteen Premier League teams in this round. The first legs were played on October 29 and 30, 2008. The second legs were played on November 5 and 6, 2008.

Team 1	Agg.	Team 2	1st leg	2nd leg
Inter Baku	4–3	Standard Baku	2–2	2–1
Simurq Zaqatala	15–1	Spartak Guba	7–1	8–0
Qäbälä	4–2	Turan Tovuz	2–1	2–1
Olimpik Baku	2–0	Karvan	1–0	1–0
Khazar Lenkoran	6–0	NBC Salyan	3–0	3–0
Baku	13–0	Qafqaz Universiteti	10–0	3–0
Karabakh	3–0	Bakili Baku	3–0	0–0
Neftchi Baku	5–1	MOIK Baku	2–1	3–0

== Quarterfinals ==
The first legs were played on February 25 while the second legs were played on March 11 and 12, 2009.

Team 1	Agg.	Team 2	1st leg	2nd leg
Inter Baku	3–2	Simurq Zaqatala	2–0	1–2
Qäbälä	2–1	Olimpik Baku	1–1	1–0
Khazar Lenkoran	2–3	Baku	0–1	2–2
Karabakh	1–0	Neftchi Baku	1–0	0–0

== Semifinals ==
The first legs were played on April 29, 2009. The second legs were played on May 6, 2009.

Team 1	Agg.	Team 2	1st leg	2nd leg
Inter Baku	5–2	Qäbälä	5–0	0–2
Baku	2–4	Karabakh	1–2	1–2

== Final ==
23 May 2009
19:00 AZST (UTC+5)

Karabakh	1–0	Inter Baku
Javadov 57' (pen.)	Summary

Tofik Bakhramov Stadium, Baku
Attendance: 5,500
