= Shamkir =

Shamkir may refer to:

- Shamkir (city), a city in Azerbaijan
- Shamkir District, a district of Azerbaijan
- Shamkir FC, a football club in Shamkir
