= 2010–11 Azerbaijan First Division =

Azerbaijan First Division
- Season: 2010–11
- Matches: 116
- Goals: 308 (2.66 per match)
- Biggest home win: FC Absheron 5-0 Energetik FC
- Biggest away win: Energetik FC 0-8 Ravan Baku
- Highest scoring: Energetik FC 0-8 Ravan Baku; FK Göyazan Qazax 2-6 Shahdag

The Azerbaijan First Division 2010-11 is the second-level of football in Azerbaijan, it is also known as the Birinci Dästä. Fourteen teams participated in Azerbaijani First Division in 2010–11.

== Teams ==
Location of teams in Azerbaijan first division 2010-11

== League table ==
Pos	Team	Pld	W	D	L	GF	GA	GD	Pts	Promotion
1	FC Absheron (P)	26	23	3	0	75	6	+69	72	Promotion to Azerbaijan Premier League
2	Ravan Baku (P)	26	19	3	4	54	14	+40	60	Promotion to Azerbaijan Premier League
3	Bakili	26	16	4	6	37	24	+13	52	
4	Qaradağ Lökbatan	26	15	5	6	47	24	+23	50	
5	FK MKT-Araz	26	15	3	8	49	34	+15	48	
6	Şahdağ	26	13	8	5	45	22	+23	47	
7	Sumgayit	26	13	5	8	34	26	+8	44	
8	Karvan	26	6	8	12	26	40	−14	26	
9	Şəmkir	26	5	7	14	15	36	−21	22	
10	ANSAD-Petrol Neftçala	26	5	6	15	28	48	−20	21	
11	Göyəzən	26	5	4	17	22	50	−28	19	
12	Energetik	26	4	6	16	17	50	−33	18	
13	Şuşa	26	3	8	15	20	41	−21	17	
14	Adliyya Baku	26	3	4	19	13	67	−54	13	

Source: Soccerways
Rules for classification: 1) points; 2) goal difference; 3) number of goals scored.
(P) Promoted

== See also ==
- 2010–11 Azerbaijan Premier League
- 2010–11 Azerbaijan Cup
