= Vagif Javadov =

Azerbaijani footballer (born 1989)

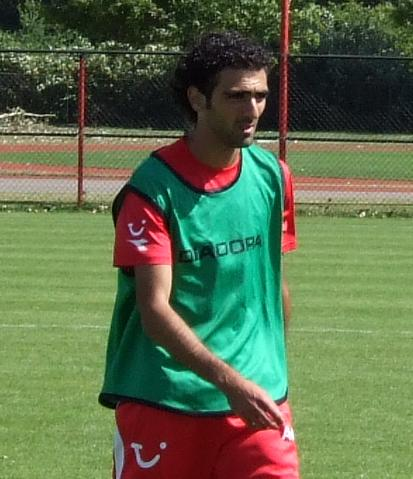
- Javadov with Twente in 2010

Personal information
- Full name: Vagif Fuzuli oglu Javadov
- Date of birth: 25 May 1989 (age 37)
- Place of birth: Baku, Azerbaijan
- Height: 1.87 m (6 ft 2 in)
- Position: Forward

Team information
- Current team: Sumgayit-2 (head coach)

Youth career
- 2004–2007: CSKA Moscow

Senior career*
Years	Team	Apps	(Gls)
2007–2010	Qarabağ	77	(20)
2010–2011	Twente	0	(0)
2010–2011	→ Baku (loan)	23	(4)
2011–2012	Volga	11	(0)
2012–2013	Qarabağ	33	(5)
2013–2014	Keshla	33	(14)
2014–2015	Gaziantep B.B.	15	(2)
2015	Boluspor	10	(1)
2015	Khazar Lankaran	0	(0)
2015	→ Gabala (loan)	4	(1)
2016	Sumgayit	26	(6)
2017	AZAL	9	(1)
2018–2020	Keşla	19	(3)
Total		260	(57)

International career
2006–2014	Azerbaijan	57	(9)

Managerial career
- 2020–2022: Sumgayit (youth)
- 2022: Turan (assistant)
- 2023–2024: Sumgayit-2
- 2024–2025: Sumgayit (interim)
- 2025–: Sumgayit-2
- * Club domestic league appearances and goals

Vagif Javadov (Azerbaijani: Vaqif Cavadov; born 25 May 1989) is an Azerbaijani football coach and a former player who played as a forward. He was voted Azerbaijani Footballer of the Year in 2009. Javadov is the head coach of the reserve team of Sumgayit FK.

== Early life ==
Javadov started playing football at age 7 and attended one of the local football schools under Vagif Pashayev. He joined CSKA's youth system at 11, playing for the club's youth and reserve teams as a striker. In 2007, he left CSKA Moscow and joined Qarabağ.

== Club career ==
After settling into the team and under the tutelage of Gurban Gurbanov, Javadov's play improved immensely and he managed to become a favourite of Qarabağ fans shortly thereafter. Javadov reaffirmed his importance to the club with an impressive first two seasons with Qarabağ, where he made almost 100 appearances and scored many goals in the league winning campaign. And he has also played in Europa League well in the matches against Rosenborg in 2010 and Twente. After matches against Twente, the Dutch team bought the footballer. His full name is Vagif Fuzuli oglu Javadov.

On 26 December 2009, following on from a successful World Cup 2010 qualification and Europa League campaign, he signed a four-and-a-half-year contract with FC Twente for an undisclosed fee. However, he failed to debut within 8 months following a string of injuries.

On 30 August 2010, Twente agreed to loan to FC Baku for a year with the option that Twente's scouts will decide after the loan spell, his return to the club or selling permanently to Baku.

On 29 June 2011, Javadov signed with the Volga Nizhny Novgorod. Following 11 goalless appearances for the Russian club, in January 2012 Javadov left the Volga as a free agent due to salary delays. On 17 January 2012, he signed a new contract with his former club FK Qarabağ.

In June 2013, Javadov signed for Inter Baku. After one year with Inter Baku, Javadov moved to TFF First League team Gaziantep B.B., signing a two-year contract, but left Gaziantep B.B. in January 2015, joining fellow TFF First League side Boluspor on a six-month contract with the option of an additional year.

On 31 August 2015, Javadov signed a four-month loan deal with Gabala from Khazar Lankaran. Javadov left Gabala at the end of his loan deal.

On 17 January 2018, Keşla announced the signing of Javadov on a six-month contract. On 22 June 2018, he signed a new contract with Keşla until the end of the 2018–19 season.

== International career ==
For Azerbaijan, Javadov is capped 51 times, scoring 9 goal. He made his national team debut on 18 May 2006 against Moldova in friendly match. He scored his first goal on 11 March 2007 against Kyrgyzstan in a friendly match.

== Coaching career ==
Javadov has been the head coach of the Sumgayit-2 in 2023–24. On 14 October 2024, he was appointed as the interim head coach of the Azerbaijan Premier League club Sumgayit. On 12 May 2025, his contract with the club was mutually terminated.

On 10 July 2025, Javadov was appointed head coach of Sumgayit-2, the reserve team of Sumgayit FK.

== Personal life ==
Javadov is the nephew of Isgandar Javadov, a famous Azerbaijani football player of the 80s.

== Career statistics ==
=== Club ===
As of match played 3 December 2015

Appearances and goals by club, season and competition
Club	Season	League			National cup		Continental		Other		Total	
Club	Season	Division	Apps	Goals	Apps	Goals	Apps	Goals	Apps	Goals	Apps	Goals
Qarabağ	2006–07	Azerbaijan Premier League	11	4			–		–		11	4
Qarabağ	2007–08	Azerbaijan Premier League	25	6			–		–		25	6
Qarabağ	2008–09	Azerbaijan Premier League	25	6			–		–		25	6
Qarabağ	2009–10	Azerbaijan Premier League	16	4			6	0	–		22	4
Qarabağ	Total		77	20	0	0	6	0	0	0	83	20
Twente	2009–10	Eredivisie	0	0	0	0	–		0	0	0	0
Baku (loan)	2010–11	Azerbaijan Premier League	23	4	4	0	–		–		27	4
Volga Nizhny Novgorod	2011–12	Russian Premier League	11	0	1	0	–		–		12	0
Qarabağ	2011–12	Azerbaijan Premier League	9	2	4	0	–		–		13	2
Qarabağ	2012–13	Azerbaijan Premier League	24	3	4	0	–		–		28	3
Qarabağ	Total		33	5	8	0	0	0	0	0	41	5
Inter Baku	2013–14	Azerbaijan Premier League	33	14	3	1	4	1	–		40	16
Gaziantep B.B.	2014–15	TFF First League	15	2	6	1	–		–		21	3
Boluspor	2014–15	TFF First League	10	1	0	0	–		–		10	1
Khazar Lankaran	2015–16	Azerbaijan Premier League	0	0	0	0	–		–		0	0
Gabala (loan)	2015–16	Azerbaijan Premier League	3	0	1	1	1	0	–		5	1
Career total			205	46	23	2	11	1	0	0	239	49

=== International ===
Appearances and goals by national team and year
National team	Year	Apps	Goals
Azerbaijan	2006	6	0
Azerbaijan	2007	6	1
Azerbaijan	2008	5	0
Azerbaijan	2009	11	4
Azerbaijan	2010	5	1
Azerbaijan	2011	7	1
Azerbaijan	2012	4	0
Azerbaijan	2013	7	2
Azerbaijan	2014	6	0
Total		57	9

Scores and results list Azerbaijan's goal tally first, score column indicates score after each Javadov goal.

List of international goals scored by Vagif Javadov
No.	Date	Venue	Opponent	Score	Result	Competition
1	11 March 2007	Kazhimukan Munaitpasov Stadium (Shymkent), Shymkent,	Kyrgyzstan	1–0	1–0	Friendly
2	11 February 2009	Kuwait National Stadium, Kuwait City,	Kuwait	1–0	1–1	Friendly
3	10 October 2009	Rheinpark Stadion, Vaduz,	Liechtenstein	1-0	2–0	2010 WC qualification
4	14 October 2009	Tofik Bakhramov Stadium, Baku,	Russia	1–1	1–1	2010 WC qualification
5	18 November 2009	Tahnoun bin Mohammed Stadium, Al Ain,	Czech Republic	1–0	2–0	Friendly
6	7 September 2010	RheinEnergieStadion, Cologne,	Germany	1–4	1–5	Euro 2012 Qualification
7	6 September 2011	Tofiq Bahramov Stadium, Baku,	Kazakhstan	3–1	3–2	Euro 2012 Qualification
8	6 February 2013	Za'abeel Stadium, Dubai,	Liechtenstein	1–0	1–0	Friendly
9	15 October 2013	Bakcell Arena, Baku,	Russia	1–1	1–1	2014 WC qualification

== Honours ==
Qarabağ

- Azerbaijan Cup: 2008–09

Twente

- Eredivisie: 2009–10
- Johan Cruijff Shield: 2010

Individual

- Azerbaijani Footballer of the Year: 2009.
