= Azerbaijan First League =

- Organising body: Azerbaijan Professional Football League
- Founded: 1992; 34 years ago
- Country: Azerbaijan
- Number of clubs: 10
- Level on pyramid: 2
- Promotion to: Premier League
- Relegation to: Second League
- Domestic cup: Azerbaijan Cup
- Current champions: Shafa (2025–26 Azerbaijan First League)
- Broadcaster(s): CBC Sport
- Website: https://liqa1.pfl.az/
- Current: 2025–26 Azerbaijan First League

The Azerbaijan First League (Azerbaijani: I Liqa) is the second highest professional division in Azerbaijani professional football. The league is run by Professional Football League of Azerbaijan, member of AFFA. The winner of the league is promoted to the top-tier Azerbaijan Premier League.

== History ==
Due to the dissolution of the Soviet Union, all Azerbaijan clubs of the former Soviet Premier Division and Soviet First Division conformed to a single Azerbaijan Premier League, which meant that the new second tier of Azerbaijan football would remain regionalized. For the first two seasons three regional groups conformed to the second tier until, in 1994, the single table in use today began to be used.

== Competition format ==
The First League currently consists of 10 teams. All teams play each other three times.

== Members of the Azerbaijan First League (2026-27 season) ==
Locations of the 2026–27 Azerbaijan First League teams.

=== Stadia and locations ===
Note: Table lists in alphabetical order.

Team	Location	Venue	Capacity
Baku Sporting	Baku	Baku Sporting Arena	600
Gəncəbasar	Ganja	Ganja Stadium	15,343
Karvan	Yevlakh	Yevlakh Stadium	6,000
Mingəçevir	Mingachevir	Yashar Mammadzade Stadium	5,200
MOİK	Baku	Khankendi Stadium	9,200
Səbail	Baku	ASCO Arena	3,200
Şahdağ Qusar	Qusar	Shamakhi OSC Stadium	2,000
Şimal	Khachmaz	Siyazan City Stadium	980
Xankəndi	Khankendi	Khankendi Stadium	9,200
Zaqatala	Zaqatala	Zaqatala City Stadium	2,800

== Media coverage ==
CBC Sport currently owns all the rights to broadcast the season's games on terrestrial TV. In Azerbaijan, the First League games are also available on CBC Sport and on a special YouTube channel.

== Winners ==
Year	Winner	Runner-up	Third place
1992	ANS Pivani Bakı FK	Kür Samux	Pambıqçı (Neftçala)
1993	Xəzri Buzovna	Avtomobilçi Yevlax	Polad Sumqayıt
1993–94	Zabrat, Azneftyağ FK	Metallurq Sumgayit, OİK-Göyəzən (Qazax)	OIK, Pambıqçı (Neftçala)
1994–95	Şəmkir	OIK	Kürmük (Qax)
1995–96	Xəzər Sumqayıt	Çinar Polis Akademiyası	Fərid
1996–97	Çinar (Göyçay)	Araz FK	Kürmük (Qax)
1997–98	Şahdağ Quba		
1998–99	[Inter Baku]		
1999–2000	Şahdağ Quba	Şəfa-2	HHQ-Şahin (Bakı)
2000–01	OIK	Ümid Bakı	Şahdağ Qusar
2001–02	Lokomotiv İmişli	Xəzər Sumqayıt	Bakılı
2002–03	Due to conflict between almost all clubs and the Association of Football Federations of Azerbaijan, no league championship was held.		
2003–04	Gənclərbirliyi	Göyəzən Qazax	Karat Bakı
2004–05	AMMK	Energetik	FKXəzər-Lənkəran-2
2005–06	Gilan	FKXəzər-Lənkəran-2	Simurq
2006–07	Masally	Standard Baku	Göyəzən Qazax
2007–08	Bakılı	MOIK	NBC Salyan
2008–09	ABN Bərdə	Şahdağ Qusar	Anşad-Petrol
2009–10	Gəncə	MOIK	Bakılı
2010–11	Abşeron	Rəvan	Bakılı
2011–12	Qaradağ	Karvan	Neftchala
2012–13	Ağsu	Qaradağ	Neftchala
2013–14	Araz Naxçıvan	Neftchala	Qaradağ
2014–15	Neftchala	Ağsu	Rəvan
2015–16	Neftchala	Qaradağ	Ağsu
2016–17	Turan Tovuz	Səbail	Ağsu
2017–18	Khazar Baku	Qaradağ Lökbatan	Shuvalan
2018–19	MOIK Baku	Sumgayit-2	Neftçi-2
2019–20	Turan Tovuz	Sabail-2	Zagatala
2020–21	Neftçi-2	Zagatala	Turan Tovuz
2021–22	Qaradağ Lökbatan FK	Shamakhi FK-2	Qarabağ FK-2
2022–23	Araz-Naxçıvan	Neftçi-2	Turan-2
2023–24	Shamakhi	Qaradağ Lökbatan	MOIK Baku
2024–25	Gabala	İmişli	Karvan
2025–26	Shafa	Mingaçevir	Sabail

=== Performance by club ===
Club	Winners	Winning years	Runner-up	Runner-up years	Third place	Third place Years
MOIK	2	2000–01, 2018–19	3	1994–95, 2007–08, 2009–10	2	1993–94, 2023–24
Qaradağ Lökbatan	2	2011–12, 2021–22	4	2012–13, 2015–16, 2017–18, 2023–24	1	2013–14
Neftchala	2	2014–15, 2015–16	1	2013–14	5	1992, 1993–94, 2008–09, 2011–12, 2012–13
Turan Tovuz	2	2016–17, 2019–20			1	2020–21
Araz Naxçıvan	2	2013–14, 2022-23				
Xəzər Sumqayıt	1	1995–96	2	1993–94, 2001–02	1	1993
Bakılı	1	2007–08	1	1996–97	3	2001–02, 2009–10, 2010–11
Ağsu	1	2012–13	1	2014–15	2	2015–16, 2016–17
Şahdağ Qusar	1	1997–98	1	2008–09	1	2000–01
Neftçi-2	1	2020–21			1	2018–19
Shuvalan FK	1	2004–05			1	2017–18
Khazar Baku	1	2017–18				
Nicat Maştağa	1	1992				
Zabrat	1	1993–94				
Shamkir	1	1994–95				
Shahdagh Guba	1	1999–00				
Lokomotiv Imishli	1	2001–02				
Gənclərbirliyi	1	2003–04				
Gilan	1	2005–06				
ABN Bərdə	1	2008–09				
Kapaz	1	2009–10				
Masally	1	2006–07				
Absheron	1	2010–11				
Azneftyağ	1	1993–94				
Xəzri Buzovna	1	1993				
Çinar Göyçay	1	1996–97				
Shamakhi	1	2023–24				
Gabala	1	2024–25				
Shafa	1	2025–26				
Göyəzən Qazax FK			2	1993–94, 2003–04	1	2006–07
Energetik			2	2004–05, 2025–26		
Zagatala			1	2020–21	1	2019–20
Xəzər-Lənkəran-2			1	2005–06	1	2004–05
Rəvan			1	2010–11	1	2014–15
Səbail			1	2016–17	1	2025–26
Şamaxı-2			1	2021–22		
Səbail-2			1	2019–20		
Avtomobilçi Yevlax			1	1993		
Çinar Polis Akademiyasi			1	1995–96		
Kür Samux			1	1992		
Şəfa-2			1	1999–00		
Ümid Bakı			1	2000–01		
Karvan			1	2011–12		
Standard Baku			1	2006–07		
Kürmük Qax					2	1994–95, 1996–97
Simurq					1	2005–06
Farid Baku					1	1995–96
Karat Bakı					1	2003–04
HHQ Şahin					1	1999–00
NBC Salyan					1	2007–08

== Records ==
=== Club records ===
As of 14 November 2013

- Most consecutive wins: Absheron, 23, 2010-11
- Most points in a season: Absheron, 72 points, 2010-11
- Most unbeaten run: Absheron, 26 games, 2010-11

== See also ==
- Azerbaijan Premier League
- Azerbaijan Regional League
- AFFA Amateur League
- Azerbaijan Cup
- Football in Azerbaijan
