= Shamkir City Stadium =

Stadium in Azerbaijan

Coordinates: 40.834852°N 46.029123°E

- Interactive map of Shamkir City Stadium
- Location: Şəmkir, Azerbaijan
- Capacity: 15,000
- Surface: Grass

Construction
- Built: 2002

Tenants
- FK Shamkir, Şəmkir

Shamkir City Stadium was a multi-purpose stadium in Shamkir, Azerbaijan. It was currently used mostly for football matches. It serves as a home ground of FK Shamkir. The stadium was reconstructed in 2002 and after reconstruction held 15,000 spectators. After a collapse of the roof it was demolished.
