= Sumgayit-2 FK =

Sumgayit-2
- Full name: Sumqayıt-2 Futbol Klubu
- Nickname(s): Kimyaçılar (Chemists)
- Founded: 2018
- Ground: Kapital Bank Arena
- Capacity: 1,500
- President: Riad Rafiyev
- Manager: Vagif Javadov
- League: Azerbaijan Reserve League
Home colours	Away colours

Sumgayit–2 is an Azerbaijani football team from Sumgayit. It is a reserve team of Azerbaijan Premier League side Sumgayit FK.

== History ==
The team was founded in 2018 and participates in the Azerbaijan Reserve League.

In 2023-2024, Vagif Javadov has been the head coach of the club. On 15 October 2024, Tural Rzayev was appointed as the head coach of Sumgayit-2. His assistant is Hikmat Huseynov, who previously coached the U-17 team of the Sumgayit.

== Honours ==
- Azerbaijan First Division

Runner-up (1): 2018–19

== Current squad ==
As of 24 August 2018

Note: Flags indicate national team as defined under FIFA eligibility rules; some limited exceptions apply. Players may hold more than one non-FIFA nationality.

No.	Pos.	Nation	Player
6	MF	(Azerbaijan) AZE	Sabuhi Abdullazade
19	FW	(Azerbaijan) AZE	Mahammad Aliyev (captain)
20	MF	(Azerbaijan) AZE	Rufat Abdullazade
23	MF	(Azerbaijan) AZE	Farid Karimzade
24	DF	(Azerbaijan) AZE	Kamran Nasirov
25	MF	(Azerbaijan) AZE	Bakhshali Bakhshaliyev
26	DF	(Azerbaijan) AZE	Elvin Damirov
27	DF	(Azerbaijan) AZE	Ismayil Babayev
28	FW	(Azerbaijan) AZE	Nazim Baghirov
29	DF	(Azerbaijan) AZE	Ulvi Aliyev

No.	Pos.	Nation	Player
41	MF	(Azerbaijan) AZE	Turan Manafov
50	GK	(Azerbaijan) AZE	Maharram Mammadli
72	MF	(Azerbaijan) AZE	Emin Zamanov
75	FW	(Azerbaijan) AZE	Ibrahim Novruzov
80	MF	(Azerbaijan) AZE	Famin Aliyev
81	GK	(Azerbaijan) AZE	Alakbar Aghayev
83	MF	(Azerbaijan) AZE	Javid Guliyev
90	FW	(Azerbaijan) AZE	Elvin Nasibov
98	DF	(Azerbaijan) AZE	Ali Aliyev
