= Ağsu FK =

- Full name: Ağsu Futbol Klubu
- Founded: 2012; 13 years ago
- Dissolved: 2020; 5 years ago
- Ground: Agsu City Stadium
- Capacity: 3.000
- Chairman: Mahir Rustamov
- Manager: Rufat Guliyev
- League: Azerbaijan First Division
- 2018–19: 13th
Home colours	Away colours

Ağsu FK (Azerbaijani: Ağsu Futbol Klubu, pronounced [ɑɣˈsu]) is an Azerbaijani football club based in Agsu. The club is currently participating in the Azerbaijan First Division.

== History ==
The club was established in 2012 and immediately joined Azerbaijan First Division. On 18 May 2013, the club sealed promotion to Azerbaijan Premier League after winning first division. However, due to the decision of the Association of Football Federations of Azerbaijan about licensing, the club did not get promoted to the Premier league.

== Stadium ==
Agsu's home ground is Agsu City Stadium, which has a capacity of 3,000.

== Achievements ==
- Azerbaijan First Division

Winners (1): 2012–13

== League and domestic cup history ==
Season	Div.	Pos.	Pl.	W	D	L	GS	GA	P	Domestic Cup
2012–13	2nd	1	24	20	3	1	65	18	63	1/16 Finals
2013–14	2nd	4	30	17	7	6	56	26	58	First round
2014–15	2nd	2	30	21	4	5	70	22	67	Second round
2015–16	2nd	3	26	13	8	5	46	29	47	did not enter
2016–17	2nd	3	26	16	5	5	63	21	53	did not enter
2017–18	2nd	9	27	8	4	15	25	48	28	First round

== Current squad ==
As of 18 August 2021

Note: Flags indicate national team as defined under FIFA eligibility rules; some limited exceptions apply. Players may hold more than one non-FIFA nationality.

No.	Pos.	Nation	Player
1	GK	(Azerbaijan) AZE	Ramil Karimov
2	DF	(Tunisia) TUN	Yunes Karimi
3	DF	(Azerbaijan) AZE	Farrukh Abdurakhmanov
4	DF	(Azerbaijan) AZE	Rouslan Mirzaliev
5	DF	(Azerbaijan) AZE	Khasandzhon Maqsumallayev
6	MF	(Azerbaijan) AZE	Sahib Kosmodib
7	FW	(Azerbaijan) AZE	Joshgun Eyvukuanov
8	MF	(Azerbaijan) AZE	Orkhan Vaqiqturov
9	MF	(Azerbaijan) AZE	Ibrahim Qabduldaiev
10	FW	(Azerbaijan) AZE	Ruslan Voroseddinov
11	MF	(Azerbaijan) AZE	Rasul B. Khakhimov

No.	Pos.	Nation	Player
12	GK	(Azerbaijan) AZE	Javid Adigozzyev
14	MF	(Azerbaijan) AZE	Fadai Nasirullazade
15	DF	(Azerbaijan) AZE	Hüseyn Abasov
16	MF	(Azerbaijan) AZE	Vusal Vavakhashev
17	DF	(Azerbaijan) AZE	Farid Hasanzade
18	MF	(Azerbaijan) AZE	Nijat Kurbanaliov
19	MF	(Azerbaijan) AZE	Ramil Aliyev (captain)
20	DF	(Azerbaijan) AZE	Rasul Q. Khakimov
22	GK	(Azerbaijan) AZE	Shamo Hasanov
—	MF	(Azerbaijan) AZE	Vusal Ishturimov
—	MF	(Uzbekistan) UZB	Zaxxor Galibjonaliyev

== Managers ==
- (Azerbaijan) Rufat Guliyev (2012–present)
