= Adliyya Baku =

Azerbaijani football club

Adliyya
- Full name: Ədliyyə Bakı
- Founded: 2001; 25 years ago
- Dissolved: 2011; 15 years ago
- Ground: Adliyya Stadium
- Capacity: 7,000
- League: Azerbaijan First Division
- 2010–2011: 14th

Adliyya Baku was an Azerbaijani football club based in Baku. Playing in the town of Baku. The club played at the Adliyya Stadium (capacity 7.000). Last time the football club competed in 2010–11 Azerbaijan First Division. On 15 March 2011, it was announced that the club has been kicked out of the national competition. The reason was shown as the dissolution of the club. It was also stated that the withdrawal from the competition is temporary. However, the return of the club is unknown.

== League and domestic cup history ==
Season	Div.	Pos.	Pl.	W	D	L	GS	GA	P	Domestic Cup
2001–02	2nd	5	12	3	2	7	11	18	11	First Round
2002–03	no league championship was held.									
2003–04	1st	9	26	7	8	11	27	40	29	Last 16
2004–05	1st	16	34	7	4	23	24	66	25	First Round
2005–06	2nd	6	30	16	8	6	63	30	56	First Round
2006–07	2nd	4	20	12	2	6	38	26	38	Last 32
2007–08	2nd	8	16	0	1	15	5	46	1	N/A
2008–09	2nd	6	28	10	5	13	47	45	35	N/A
2009–10	2nd	11	22	3	5	14	16	40	14	N/A
2010–11	2nd	14	26	3	4	19	13	67	13	N/A
