= Göyazan Qazakh FK =

Professional football club in Azerbaijan

FK Göyəzən Qazax
- Full name: Futbol Klubu Göyəzən
- Founded: 1978; 48 years ago
- Dissolved: 2017; 9 years ago
- Ground: Qazakh City Stadium, Qazakh, Azerbaijan
- Capacity: 15000
- Chairman: Elxan Muradov
- Manager: Süleyman Məmmədov
- League: Azerbaijan First Division
- 2016–17: 14th
Home colours	Away colours

Göyazan Qazakh FK was an Azerbaijani football club. The club took part in Azerbaijan First Division.

== History ==
The club was founded in 1978, re-established in 1986 and 2003. FC Goyazan participated in five Soviet Second League seasons during 1987–1991 years and ranked 5th in 1988 and made its best indicator. In 1986 they also won Azerbaijan USSR League.

The team did not enter consecutively latest five Azerbaijan Cup seasons, even though it participated in Azerbaijan First Division.

== Honours ==
- Azerbaijan USSR League

Champions (1) : 1986

- AFFA Amateur League

Winners (1) : 2002–03

== League and domestic cup history ==
Season	Div.	Pos.	Pl.	W	D	L	GS	GA	P	Domestic Cup
1992	1st	23	38	12	2	24	37	70	26	1/16 Finals
1993–94	2nd	5	20	16	3	1	60	6	35	1/8 Finals
1994–95	2nd	4	28	19	5	4	43	25	43	1/16 Finals
1995–96	2nd	4	28	18	4	6	30	14	58	1/16 Finals
2003–04	2nd	2	14	9	4	1	21	6	31	1/16 Finals
2004–05	1st	11	34	9	6	19	30	52	33	1/8 Finals
2005–06	1st	14	26	0	9	17	14	52	9	1/8 Finals
2006–07	2nd	3	30	20	4	6	65	25	64	Did not enter
2007–08	2nd	7	16	8	3	5	35	19	27	Did not enter
2008–09	2nd	7	28	6	4	18	27	55	22	Did not enter
2009–10	2nd	12	22	1	4	17	16	55	7	Did not enter
2010–11	2nd	10	26	5	4	17	22	50	19	Did not enter
2011–12	2nd	14	26	1	4	21	17	74	7	Did not enter
2012–13	2nd	12	24	4	5	15	23	61	17	Did not enter
2013–14	2nd	16	30	3	2	25	13	89	11	Did not enter
2014–15	2nd	15	30	3	3	24	15	91	12	Did not enter
2015–16	2nd	12	26	3	8	15	17	42	17	Did not enter
2016–17	2nd	14	26	2	4	20	20	99	10	Did not enter
2017–18	RL									Did not enter
