= Spartak Guba FK =

- Full name: Spartak Quba Futbol Klubu
- Founded: 1961; 65 years ago
- Dissolved: 2011; 15 years ago
- Ground: Quba City Stadium; Quba (city), Azerbaijan
- Capacity: 2,000
- League: Azerbaijan First Division
Home colours	Away colours	Third colours

Spartak Guba FK (Azerbaijani: Spartak Quba Futbol Klubu) was a Azerbaijani football club based in Quba (city).

== History ==
The club was founded in 1961 under the name of Spartak.
