= Absheron FK =

Absheron FC
- Full name: Absheron Football Club
- Nickname: Qartallar (The Eagles)
- Founded: 2010 | 12 years ago
- Stadium: Crystal Absheron Stadium
- Capacity: 1,500
- Manager: mohammad reza Abdollahi
- League: AFFA Amateur League
- 2018-19: 1st
Home colours	Away colours

Abşeron FK is an Azerbaijani football club. The club plays in the AFFA Amateur League.

== History ==
Founded in 2010, the club immediately gained admittance to the Azerbaijan First Division in 2010. In April 2011 the team secured their promotion to Azerbaijan Premier League after clinching First division's champion title. Absheron had an unbeaten run in the first division and broke new records for a club with most points in the first division and most victories in a season.

On 1 July 2011, Absheron FC announced that due to sponsorship problems the club would cease to exist, with their place in the Premier League being taken by Sumgayit City F.C.

Absheron FC resumed its activities on November 29, 2017. Today the club still exist, but however the club was used as a youth team.

== Current squad ==
As of 27 June 2011

Note: Flags indicate national team as defined under FIFA eligibility rules; some limited exceptions apply. Players may hold more than one non-FIFA nationality.

No.	Pos.	Nation	Player
1	GK	SRB	Vladimir Mićović (captain)
2	MF	UZB	Muteyf Khalilov
3	DF	AZE	Farrukh Rahimov
4	DF	AZE	Emin Mehtiyev
5	DF	AZE	Ramil Nuriyev
6	MF	AZE	Natig Karimi
7	DF	AZE	Karim Tiqnizov
8	MF	AZE	Ismayil Mammadov
11	FW	AZE	Kamil Kamilli
14	MF	AZE	Habil Nurahmadov
15	FW	AZE	Ruslan Agayev
16	MF	AZE	Mehdi Rasulov
17	DF	AZE	Faiz Khailov
18	FW	AZE	Afiq Yusifov

No.	Pos.	Nation	Player
19	DF	AZE	Aleksandr Shemonayev
20	MF	AZE	Ceyhun Javadov
21	MF	AZE	Kamil Nurahmadov
22	DF	AZE	Timur Israfilov
25	MF	AZE	Oleksey Gavrilyuk
30	FW	UZB	Mutayfoor Yahyaev
33	MF	AZE	Tural Babali
83	DF	AZE	Rustam Rustamov
44	GK	AZE	Andrey Popovic
50	FW	AZE	Elnur Rajabov
55	GK	AZE	Sadig Ramazanov
97	MF	AZE	Garib Ibrahimov
98	MF	AZE	Khalig Rustamli
99	GK	AZE	Muselyum Asadov

== Honours ==
- AFFA Amateur League

Winners (1) : 2017–18

== League and domestic cup history ==
League	Season	Pos.	Pl.	W	D	L	GS	GA	Domestic Cup	P
Azerbaijan Premier League	2010-11	1	26	23	3	0	75	6	Quarter-final	-
AFFA Amateur League	2017-18	1	23	19	4	0	52	17	----	-
AFFA Amateur League	2018-19	1	23	18	2	3	65	29	----	-

== Managers ==
Name	Managerial Tenure	P	W	D	L	Win %
Vugar Mustafayev	2017-	52	40	9	3	68%
