= Zagatala PFK =

- Full name: Zaqatala Peşəkar Futbol Klubu
- Founded: 2005; 20 years ago, as Simurq; 2015; 10 years ago, as Zaqatala
- Ground: Zaqatala City Stadium, Zaqatala, Azerbaijan
- Capacity: 3,500
- President: Musa Gurbanov
- Manager: Rustam Mammadov
- League: Azerbaijan First Division
- 2024–25: 5th
Home colours	Away colours

Zagatala PFK (Azerbaijani: Zaqatala Peşəkar Futbol Klubu) is an Azerbaijani football club based in Zaqatala.

== History ==
The club was founded in 2015 and participates in the Azerbaijan First Division.

=== League and Cup ===
Season	Div.	Pos.	Pl.	W	D	L	GS	GA	P	Domestic Cup
2015–16	2nd	6	26	9	9	8	47	36	36	-
2016–17	2nd	5	26	15	4	7	69	31	49	Second round
2017–18	2nd	10	27	4	7	16	23	42	19	Second round

== Stadium ==
Zaqatala City Stadium is a football stadium in Zagatala. It is currently used as the club's home stadium and holds 3,500 people.

== Managers ==
- (Azerbaijan) Shaban Shirdanov (2015–2017)
- (Azerbaijan) Ilgar Aslanli (2017)
- (Azerbaijan) Rustam Mammadov (2018–)
