= Bakılı PFK =

- Full name: Bakılı Peşəkar Futbol Klubu
- Founded: 1963; 62 years ago
- Dissolved: 2017
- Ground: Shafa Stadium (IV field), Baku, Azerbaijan
- Chairman: Misir Abilov
- Manager: Ali Huseynov
- League: Azerbaijan First Division
- 2014–15: 10th
- Website: bakili-footballclub.com
Home colours	Away colours

Bakılı PFK is an Azerbaijani football club, based in Baku that currently plays in the Azerbaijan First Division.

== History ==
The club was founded in 1963 under the name of Araz, re-established by Misir Abilov in 1995 and consisted of amateur footballers. Officially as a professional football club it was registered as Araz Football Club in 1997. Since 1998 the club is called Bakili Baku.

The team participated in Soviet Second League in 1990 and 1991 seasons. In addition Bakili Baku has won Azerbaijan USSR League seven times and one time Azerbaijan USSR Cup.

In May 2014, AFFA decided to ban the club from playing next season after players didn't appear at the last game of Azerbaijan First Division. In August 2014, AFFA overturned their decision by allowing club to participate in the 2014–15 season.

== Achievements ==
- Azerbaijan USSR League

Champions (7): 1963, 1967, 1969, 1973, 1974, 1975, 1976

- Azerbaijan USSR Cup

Winner (1): 1988

== League and domestic cup history ==
Season	Div.	Pos.	Pl.	W	D	L	GS	GA	P	Domestic Cup
1995–96	3rd	12	21	3	1	17	21	49	10	Did not enter
1996–97	2nd	2	10	5	3	2	12	7	18	1/16 Finals
1997–98	1st	10	26	8	4	14	35	43	28	Preliminary Round
1998–99	1st	10	32	7	7	18	18	51	28	Quarter-Finals
2000–01	2nd	8	22	6	8	8	29	25	26	1/16 Finals
2001–02	2nd	3	12	6	3	3	25	12	21	1/8 Finals
2003–04	1st	7	26	10	4	12	40	46	34	Semi-Finals
2004–05	1st	17	34	3	5	26	22	71	14	1/8 Finals
2005–06	2nd	6	30	16	8	6	32	23	56	1/8 Finals
2006–07	2nd	5	10	2	2	6	17	21	8	1/8 Finals
2007–08	2nd	1	10	5	4	1	8	4	19	1/16 Finals
2008–09	1st	13	26	3	3	20	14	65	12	1/8 Finals
2009–10	2nd	3	22	14	1	7	41	19	43	1/8 Finals
2010–11	2nd	3	26	16	4	6	37	24	52	1/16 Finals
2011–12	2nd	5	26	11	5	10	36	28	38	1/8 Finals
2012–13	2nd	7	24	7	7	10	30	38	28	1/16 Finals
2013–14	2nd	14	30	6	6	18	34	60	24	Did not enter
2014–15	2nd	10	30	10	4	16	46	61	34	Did not enter
2015–16	2nd	9	26	8	6	12	34	46	30	Did not enter
2016–17	2nd	12	26	3	2	21	30	99	11	First round
