= Shamkir FC =

- Full name: Şəmkir Futbol Klubu
- Founded: 1954; 72 years ago
- Dissolved: 2017; 9 years ago
- Ground: Shamkir Olympic Sport Complex Stadium
- Capacity: 2,500
- Manager: Kamran Alibabaev
- League: Azerbaijan First Division
- 2015–16: 5th
- Website: https://shamkirfc.az/
Home colours	Away colours

Shamkir Football Club (Azerbaijani: Şəmkir Futbol Klubu) was an Azerbaijani football club based in Şəmkir, that currently plays in the Azerbaijan First Division. The club is one of the oldest and most successful clubs in Azerbaijan's football history with two Azerbaijan Premier League titles.

== History ==
The club was established in 1954, even though it never participated in any Soviet football league. It was re-established in 1993. Shamkir's most successful years were at the start of the 2000s, after Shahbaz Suleymanov's takeover, the club with Agaselim Mirjavadov consecutively won three Azerbaijan Premier League titles and reached the final of Azerbaijan Cup three times. The club also became the first Azerbaijani team to pass the qualifying stage of Champions League. In 2005, the club was briefly defunct due to sponsorship reasons but re-established once again on 19 August 2009 after finding sponsors.

== Stadium ==
Shamkir Olympic Sport Complex Stadium is a multi-purpose stadium in Shamkir, Azerbaijan. It is used as a home ground of Shamkir FC since 2010.

== Honours ==
=== National ===
- Azerbaijan Premier League

Winners (2): 1999–00, 2000–01

- Azerbaijan First Division

Winners (1): 1994–95

== League and domestic cup history ==
Season	Div.	Pos.	Pl.	W	D	L	GS	GA	P	Domestic Cup
1993–94	2nd	8	18	12	0	6	42	19	24	Preliminary Round
1994–95	2nd	1	28	21	6	1	38	11	48	1/16 Finals
1995–96	1st	10	20	3	4	13	15	39	13	Quarter-Finals
1996–97	1st	12	30	8	2	20	30	106	26	1/8 Finals
1997–98	1st	3	26	15	9	2	44	10	54	Quarter-Finals
1998–99	1st	2	36	21	3	12	52	34	66	Runners-Up
1999-00	1st	1	22	17	4	1	46	11	55	1/8 Finals
2000–01	1st	1	20	16	3	1	60	14	51	1/8 Finals
2001–02 (Note: The AFFA and the clubs were discontinued due to the conflict between the clubs and the results were not taken into account.)	1st	1	32	23	7	2	80	20	76	Runners-Up
2003–04	1st	2	26	20	4	2	67	11	64	Runners-Up
2004–05	1st	13	34	9	5	20	34	48	32	1/8 Finals
2010–11	2nd	9	26	5	7	14	15	36	22	Preliminary Round
2011–12	2nd	8	26	9	6	11	38	38	33	did not enter
2012–13	2nd	13	24	3	6	15	23	56	15	did not enter
2013–14	2nd	11	30	8	7	15	28	42	31	did not enter
2014–15	2nd	11	30	8	8	14	25	46	32	did not enter
2015–16	2nd	5	26	10	8	8	30	24	38	Second round
2016–17	2nd	6	26	15	3	8	41	20	48	First round
2017–18	RL									did not enter

== UEFA club competition results ==
- Q = Qualifying

Season	Competition	Round	Country	Club	Home	Away	Aggregate
1999/00	UEFA Cup	Q	(Ukraine)	Kryvbas Kryviy Rih	0–2	0–3	0–5
2000/01	UEFA Champions League	Q1	(Latvia)	Skonto Riga	4–1	1–2	5–3
		Q2	(Czech Republic)	SK Slavia Prague	1–4	0–1	1–5
2001/02	UEFA Champions League	Q1	(Wales)	Barry Town	0–1	0–2	0–3
2004/05	UEFA Cup	Q1	(Georgia (country))	FC Tbilisi	1–4	0–1	1–5

== Managers ==
=== Managers in modern history ===
- (Azerbaijan) Afgan Talybov (1997–1998)
- (Azerbaijan) Agaselim Mirjavadov (1998–2001)
- (Azerbaijan) Gahraman Aliyev (2001–2005)
- (Azerbaijan) Faig Jabbarov (2009–2011)
- (Azerbaijan) Anar Kalantarov (2011–2013)
- (Azerbaijan) Ruslan Abbasov (2013–2015)
- (Azerbaijan) Kamran Alibabayev (2015–2016)
- (Azerbaijan) Gahraman Aliyev (2016–2017)
- (Georgia (country)) Badri Kvaratskhelia (2017)
