= Mughan FK =

Muğan FK
- Full name: Muğan Futbol Klubu
- Founded: 2007; 18 years ago
- Dissolved: 2012; 13 years ago
- Ground: Salyan Olympic Sport Complex Stadium, Salyan, Azerbaijan
- Capacity: 2,000
- League: Azerbaijan First Division
- 2011–2012: 10th
Home colours	Away colours

Mughan FK (Azerbaijani: Muğan Futbol Klubu) was an Azerbaijani football club, based in Salyan. The club reached the Azerbaijan Premier League for the first time in 2008–2009. The club was first promoted after FK Masallı withdrew for the 2008/09 season. On 31 October 2008, FK NBC Salyan changed its name to FK Mughan.

== History ==
Founded in 2007, FK Mughan played their first season in the First Division, A Grupu, under the name of FK NBC Salyan. Finishing First in this group, they were admitted to the Second stage of the season. The club failed to achieve promotion, finishing third in the group. However, FK Masallı withdrew for the 2008/09 season, so FK Mughan gained a spot in the Azerbaijan Premier League.

In the 2008/09 season, FK NBC Salyan changed their name in FK Mughan on 31 October 2008. Their first match in the Azerbaijan Premier League was against FK Qäbälä. They lost 4–1. Their first victory was in round 3. Against PFC Turan Tovuz they won with 3–1. Finishing the season on the 12th spot, FK Mughan had just enough points to stay clear of relegation.

In 2010–11 season, club finished 8th place but due sponsorship reasons, club is ruled out to participate in the next season and will be replaced by Simurq PFC. In 2012, club's owners announced that club will be dissolved and they will not be participating in Azerbaijan First Division.

== Colours and crest ==
FK Mughan's traditional kit is a white shirt with orange sides, white shorts with white socks. Their away kit is an orange with white sides. FK Mughan's current logo contains jumping gazelles, which is the sign of swiftness, speed and agility in Azerbaijani folklore.

== League and domestic cup history ==
Season	League									Azerbaijan Cup	Top goalscorer	
Season	Div.	Pos.	Pl.	W	D	L	GS	GA	P	Azerbaijan Cup	Name	League
2007–08	2nd	5	20	11	5	4	29	13	38	1/16 Finals		
2008–09	1st	12	26	4	2	20	19	53	14	1/8 Finals	(Azerbaijan) Farid Guliyev (Moldova) Vladimir Ţaranu	4
2009–10	1st	10	20	7	6	7	17	16	27	1/8 Finals	(Azerbaijan) Vüsal Hüseynov	5
2010–11	1st	8	32	13	8	11	29	31	47	1/8 Finals	(Uruguay) Angel Gutierrez (Sweden) John Pelu	5
2011–12	2nd	10	26	9	4	13	26	43	31	Preliminary Round		

== Managers ==
- (Azerbaijan) Vladislav Kadyrov (2007–2008)
- (Azerbaijan) Nadir Gasymov (2008–2009)
- (Bosnia and Herzegovina) Kemal Alispahić (2009)
- (Bosnia and Herzegovina) Almir Hurtić (2009–2010)
- (Azerbaijan) Bahman Hasanov (2010–2011)
- (Azerbaijan) Heydar Aghayev (2011–2012)
