= Energetik FK =

Azerbaijani football club

Mingəçevir FK
- Full name: Mingəçevir Football Club
- Founded: 1966; 59 years ago
- Ground: Yashar Mammadzade Stadium, Mingachevir, Azerbaijan
- Capacity: 5,000
- Manager: Ramiz Mammadov

Mingəçevir FK is an Azerbaijani football club based in Mingachevir. One of the oldest and most popular clubs in Azerbaijan, it currently plays in the Azerbaijan First Division.

== History ==
The club was established in 1966 and took part in Soviet Second League and Azerbaijan Premier League under the next names like Textilshchik (1966–70), Avtomobilist (1980–87), Kur (1990–93), Kur-Nur (1993–98). The club re-established to the beginning of 2003–04 season and was named Energetik FC belonging Mingachevir HPP.

In recent seasons, the club participates in Azerbaijan First League. In 2004–05 season Energetik was promoted to the Premier League but withdrew because of financial problems.

== League and domestic cup history ==
Season	Div.	Pos.	Pl.	W	D	L	GS	GA	P	Domestic Cup
1992	1st	7	36	19	3	14	50	39	41	Runners-Up
1993	1st	6	18	6	6	6	21	25	18	1/8 Finals
1993–94	1st	5	30	13	7	10	36	33	33	1/8 Finals
1994–95	1st	5	24	13	2	9	40	24	28	Runners-Up
1995–96	1st	6	20	1	4	15	12	46	7	1/8 Finals
1996–97	1st	13	30	7	4	19	30	59	25	Quarter-Finals
1997–98	1st	11	26	8	3	15	26	36	27	Quarter-Finals
2003–04	2nd	4	14	9	1	4	26	9	28	1/8 Finals
2004–05	2nd	2	14	10	1	3	34	13	31	1/16 Finals
2005–06	2nd	10	30	10	5	15	41	52	35	1/16 Finals
2006–07	2nd	7	20	7	4	9	28	37	25	1/16 Finals
2007–08	2nd	6	15	4	3	8	19	25	15	1/16 Finals
2008–09	2nd	4	28	14	8	6	51	29	50	1/16 Finals
2009–10	2nd	10	22	3	6	13	24	51	15	Did not enter
2010–11	2nd	13	26	3	6	17	14	52	15	Did not enter
2011–12	2nd	12	26	6	7	13	21	45	25	Did not enter
2012–13	2nd	10	26	5	5	15	26	52	19	Did not enter
2013–14	2nd	15	30	2	5	23	11	92	11	Did not enter
2014–15	2nd	14	30	5	3	22	24	82	18	Did not enter
2015–16	2nd	13	26	4	3	19	14	100	15	Did not enter
2016–17	2nd	11	26	5	5	16	25	86	20	Did not enter
