= Shahdag Qusar FK =

Shahdagh Qusar FK
- Full name: Şahdağ Qusar Futbol Klubu
- Founded: 1950; 76 years ago as Nefteqaz
- Ground: Şövkət Orduxanov Stadium; Qusar, Azerbaijan
- Capacity: 4,000
- Chairman: Arastun Niftiyev
- Manager: Adil Mahmudov
- League: Azerbaijan First League pattern_la1=
Home colours	Away colours

Shahdagh Qusar FK (Azerbaijani: Şahdağ Qusar FK) is an Azerbaijani football club based in Qusar, that currently takes part in Azerbaijan First Division.

== History ==
The club was founded in 1950 and prior to 1998, called "Nefteqaz". In 2003, club was renamed to Shahdag-Samur. Firstly the team participated at Soviet Second League in 1990 and 1991 seasons. Shahdag also was among 26 participating teams at first football championship of independent Azerbaijan. During the 1990s, the club stopped existence twice because of the financial problems and most recently refounded in 2000.

== Crest and colours ==
In 2013, the club unveiled an official crest, designed by Azerbaijani graphic designer Toghrul Babayev.

== League and domestic cup history ==
Season	Div.	Pos.	Pl.	W	D	L	GS	GA	P	Domestic Cup
1992	1st	12	36	11	17	18	34	54	29	1/8 Finals
1993	1st	18	18	3	3	12	19	38	9	Quarter-Finals
1993–94	1st	13	30	11	2	17	40	52	24	1/8 Finals
1997–98	2nd	1								1/8 Finals
1998–99	1st	13	32	2	4	20	20	86	10	1/8 Finals
2000–01	3rd	3	22	16	3	3	40	15	51	Quarter-Finals
2001–02	1st	8	30	11	5	14	34	47	38	Quarter-Finals
2003–04	1st	10	26	7	6	13	29	41	27	1/16 Finals
2004–05	1st	14	34	8	8	18	29	51	32	1/16 Finals
2005–06	1st	8	26	10	5	11	26	36	35	1/8 Finals
2006–07	1st	13	24	1	8	15	15	47	11	1/16 Finals
2007–08	2nd	6	26	11	5	10	31	21	38	1/16 Finals
2008–09	2nd	2	28	14	9	5	48	29	51	1/16 Finals
2009–10	2nd	8	22	8	8	6	33	24	32	1/8 Finals
2010–11	2nd	5	26	13	8	5	45	22	47	1/16 Finals
2011–12	2nd	4	26	13	6	7	46	33	45	1/16 Finals
2012–13	2nd	4	24	12	6	6	40	30	42	did not enter
2013–14	2nd	5	30	16	7	7	55	22	55	First round
2014–15	2nd	7	30	13	8	9	40	29	47	Second round
2015–16	2nd	10	26	8	6	12	31	54	30	First round
2016–17	2nd	9	26	8	6	12	36	45	30	Second round

== Current squad ==
As of 7 August 2016

Note: Flags indicate national team as defined under FIFA eligibility rules; some limited exceptions apply. Players may hold more than one non-FIFA nationality.

No.	Pos.	Nation	Player
1	GK	RUS	Tofiq Shafiyev
2	GK	AZE	Adil Alimammadov
3	DF	AZE	Elchin Sadullayev
4	DF	AZE	Vigar Alibabayev
5	DF	AZE	Elnur Shiriyev
6	DF	IRN	Seyedaydin Hosseini
7	DF	NGA	Uche Chukunyere
8	DF	AZE	Firudin Aghalarov
9	DF	AZE	Kamran Aghakarimov
10	DF	AZE	Mahiddin Aghamov
11	DF	AZE	Igrar Samadov
13	MF	IRN	Nami Masud
14	MF	AZE	Hagverdi Hasanov
15	MF	NGA	Patrick Sani
16	MF	AZE	Kamran Nurahmadov

No.	Pos.	Nation	Player
17	MF	AZE	Elmin Ismayilzade
18	MF	AZE	Faik Agharahimov
19	MF	AZE	Elmar Yahyabayov
20	MF	AZE	Ramil Mansurov
21	MF	AZE	Khayal Gochayev
22	MF	AZE	Elmin Hasanov
23	MF	RUS	Arsen Korchaev
24	MF	RUS	Magomedsaid Magomedov
25	FW	AZE	Kamil Nurahmadov
26	FW	NGA	Victor Emenayo
27	FW	IRN	Seyedhossein Ziai
28	FW	AZE	Seymur Ashurbayov
29	FW	AZE	Sarkhan Aghayev
30	FW	AZE	Nabi Nabizade
