= Neftchala FK =

- Full name: Neftçala Futbol Klubu
- Founded: 2011
- Dissolved: 2016
- Ground: Nariman Narimanov Stadium, Neftchala, Azerbaijan
- Capacity: 5,000
- Chairman: Famil Safiyev
- Manager: Kamal Guliyev
- League: Azerbaijan First Division
- 2015–16: 2nd
Home colours

Neftchala FK is an Azerbaijani football club based in Neftçala. The club is currently participating in the Azerbaijan First Division. The club is from Neftchala.

== History ==
The club was established in 2004 under the name of Anşad Petrol by Azerbaijani-Malaysian-Turkish joint venture with same name and played in Azerbaijan First Division. In 2011, after company went defunct, club was overtaken by SOCAR Petroleum and changes its name to FK Neftchala.

== League and domestic cup history ==
Season	Div.	Pos.	Pl.	W	D	L	GS	GA	P	Domestic Cup
2004–05	2nd	5	14	5	5	4	22	19	20	1/16 Finals
2005–06	2nd	4	30	20	2	8	56	30	62	1/16 Finals
2006–07	2nd	6	24	14	4	6	44	23	46	Preliminary Round
2007–08	2nd	5	10	3	2	8	10	15	11	1/16 Finals
2008–09	2nd	3	28	15	6	7	50	31	51	1/16 Finals
2009–10	2nd	9	22	5	2	15	25	61	17	1/16 Finals
2010–11	2nd	10	26	5	6	15	28	48	21	1/16 Finals
2011–12	2nd	2	26	16	7	3	42	16	55	1/16 Finals
2012–13	2nd	3	24	17	3	4	51	18	54	1/8 Finals
2013–14	2nd	2	30	21	5	4	80	22	68	Second round
2014–15	2nd	1	30	25	3	2	83	19	78	Second round
2015–16	2nd	1	26	20	2	4	74	20	62	Second round
2017–18	RL	2	12	6	0	6	18	14	18	Did not enter

== Current squad ==
As of 27 February 2016

Note: Flags indicate national team as defined under FIFA eligibility rules; some limited exceptions apply. Players may hold more than one non-FIFA nationality.

No.	Pos.	Nation	Player
3	MF	(Azerbaijan) AZE	Roini Ismayilov
4	DF	(Azerbaijan) AZE	Ramazan Hasanov
5	DF	(Azerbaijan) AZE	Musa Rahimov
6	MF	(Azerbaijan) AZE	Farid Samadzade
7	MF	(Azerbaijan) AZE	Nakim Valiyev (captain)
8	MF	(Azerbaijan) AZE	Agshin Mukhtaroglu
9	FW	(Azerbaijan) AZE	Farmayil Aliyev
10	MF	(Azerbaijan) AZE	Elvin Adishirinli
11	MF	(Azerbaijan) AZE	Anar Babayev
13	GK	(Azerbaijan) AZE	Ali Hasanli
15	MF	(Azerbaijan) AZE	Aslan Huseynov
17	MF	(Azerbaijan) AZE	Javad Kazimov
20	FW	(Azerbaijan) AZE	Agshin Hashimov

No.	Pos.	Nation	Player
22	MF	(Azerbaijan) AZE	Mahammad Khalilov
23	GK	(Azerbaijan) AZE	Farid Aghayev
24	MF	(Azerbaijan) AZE	Elnur Mustafazade
38	MF	(Azerbaijan) AZE	Mubarak Shaguliyev
45	DF	(Azerbaijan) AZE	Mehman Mammadov
47	MF	(Azerbaijan) AZE	Mahammad Abbasov
66	DF	(Azerbaijan) AZE	Ulvi Gachayli
70	MF	(Azerbaijan) AZE	Anar Babazade
77	MF	(Azerbaijan) AZE	Emin Mirzaliyev
90	GK	(Azerbaijan) AZE	Ramil Karimov
99	DF	(Azerbaijan) AZE	Jamil Rahimli

== Managers ==
- (Azerbaijan) Huseyngulu Guliyev (2012)
- (Azerbaijan) Kamal Alakbarov (2012–13)
- (Azerbaijan) Bahram Shahguliyev (2013–2014)
- (Azerbaijan) Kamal Guliyev (2014–present)
