= Agsu (city) =

Agsu Ağsu
- City and municipality
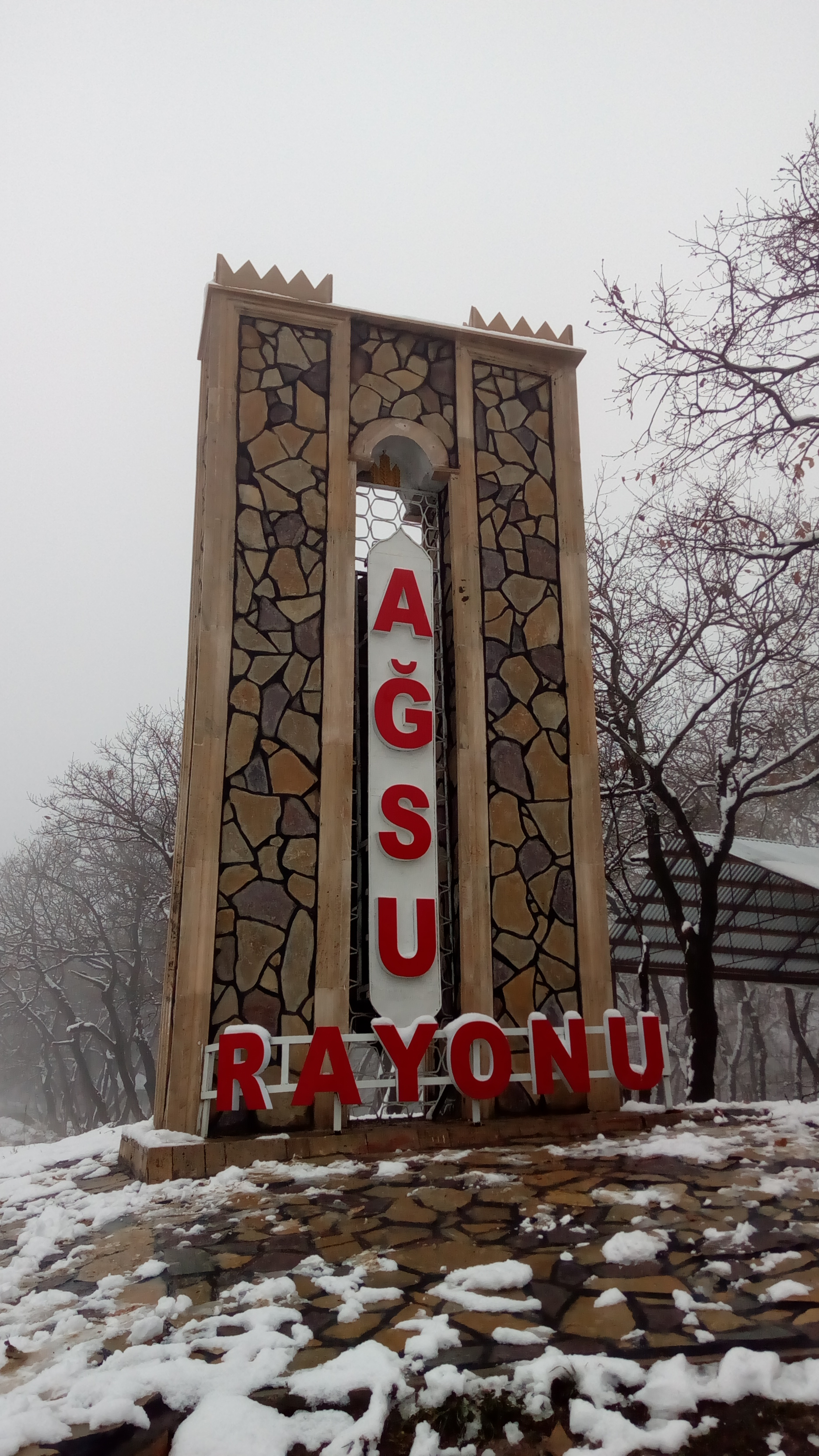

- Location within Azerbaijan
- Coordinates: 40°34′09″N 48°24′03″E
- Country: Azerbaijan
- District: Agsu
- Elevation: 680 m (2,230 ft)

Population (2011)
  - Total: 20,100
- Time zone: UTC+4 (AZT)
- Area code: +994 198
- Website: Official website

Agsu (Azerbaijani: Ağsu) is a city and the capital of the Agsu District of Azerbaijan.

== History ==
Abbasgulu Bakikhanov noted that Nadir Shah issued an order for resettlement of the inhabitants of Shamakhi to the newly laid down city on the bank of Agsuchay, in 1735. At present, the name of Agsu city (which is the centre of Agsu district) is shown as New Shamakhi in some sources. It is related to the resettlement of the inhabitants of Shamakhi to Agsu City. Since that time, historic Shamakhi has been called Old Shamakhi and Agsu—New Shamakhi.

The name of the city in the 18th century was frequently shown as Agsu, deriving from "Agsuchay". "Ruined city" – ruins of the Agsu city of the memory of the 18th century are located in the north of Agsu city.

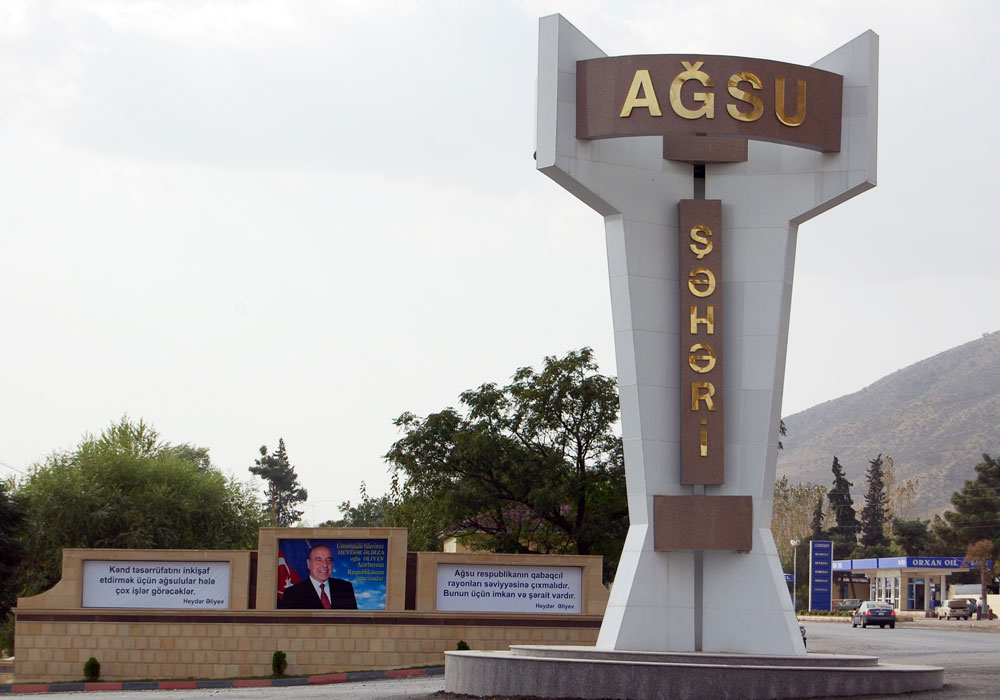
Road sign at the entrance to Aghsu city

S. Bronevski noted that the city was fenced with fortress walls, with a trench dug outside them. The castle had quadrangle and round towers. The lower parts of the houses consisted of basements, and the upper parts of the dwellings tumbled down onto these basements. Holes are the remainders of the basements and houses. The dwelling buildings were erected very close to each other. The streets were narrow, and transport with wagons was not possible. Though the central streets were comparatively wide.

Earthenware of the Middle Ages and a coin minted with the name Surkhay Khan were found in Agsu city. The coin had been minted before Nadir Shah's order about laying out the city. But it raises the probability of the creation of Agsu city on the base of an existing Agsu village. At the same time, materials and ceramic goods belonging to 100–150 years before the occupation of Shamakhi by Nadir Shah were found during initial research in the "Ruined city". Perhaps, Nadir Shah had issued an order for additional works after the resettlement of the inhabitants in the village.

Agsu City had durable fortress walls and defensive towers in the 18th century. The city had gradually developed, and it had become one of the largest cities of Azerbaijan at the end of the 18th century. V. Leviatov noted that when the population of New Shamakhi (Agsu) had reached nearly 10,000, the population of Gandja, Ardabil, Shusha, Nukha, Baku and other cities had not exceeded 3 to 8 thousand.

Agsu city was one of the leading cities in the socio-political and military life of Azerbaijan at the end of the Middle Ages. In 1734, Nadir Shah attacked Shamakhi with his troops. The inhabitants of Shamakhi resisted the attack, notwithstanding the fact that Surkhay Khan had left the city. In August 1734, Nadir Shah's troops overcame the resistance, and the city was torched. In 1735, Nadir Shah issued an order about laying out the new city on the bank of Agsuchay river. After construction of the new city, the inhabitants of Shamakhi were resettled here; the residences of the rulers of Shamakhi were also moved here.

In 1743, the inhabitants rebelled against Nadir Shah's yoke. Liar princes of Safaviler – I, II, III Sam Mirzas came out. Two of them operated in Shirvan. I Sam Mirza occupied New Shamakhi (Agsu) to the accompaniment of Surkhay Khan's troop of fifty thousand. He revoked taxes imposed by Nadir Shah. But, I Sam Mirza was killed in the war by the son of Nadir Shah, Nasrullah Mirza.

II Sam Mirza made a great rebellion in Shirvan together with Mohammad (the son of Surkhay), in 1743. People of Agsu banished Iranian officials from the city. But, despite three defeats, Nasrullah occupied Agsu Castle. Based on source, Persians encircled the city. The city was occupied some days later, and people were killed. Nadir Shah had called this day "Allah dad" (God, help me).

There were organized independent khanates after the death of Nadir Shah (1747). That of the khanates was Shirvan (1747–1763) whose supremacy was diarchy. At this time, feudal lords struggled against each other in Azerbaijan; in 1755, Khan of Shaki Hazhi Chalabi Khan encircled Agsu city under existing conditions. Hazhi Chalabi Khan retreated after grievous loss in the war around Agsu. Hussein Ali Khan went back to his khanate, notwithstanding Hazhi Mohammad Ali Khan had given the key of the city to him. In 1762, Transcaucasia was shrouded in plague.

In 1763, Agsu and Shamakhi were amalgamated. Mohammad Said Khan and Agasi Khan occupied Agsu, and then killed Hazhi Mohammad Ali Khan. The capital was moved from Agsu to Shamakhi. In 1767, Fatali Khan (Khan of khanate Guba) and Hussein Khan (Khan of khanate Shaki) joined and encircled Shamakhi from two sides. But Mohammad Said Khan and Agasi Khan were not able to resist. Consequently, the capital was removed to Agsu. Sardar and Hassan estates of Shirvan were amalgamated to khanate Shaki, and the remaining estates were amalgamated to khanate Guba.

In 1769, Agsu city was ruined by the troop of Fatali khan (khan of khanate Guba), the inhabitants were removed to Shamakhi. Based on sources, all inhabitants were settled down in Shamakhi in a brief time. S. Gmelin noted that when he was in Agsu he could not find anything except destroyed buildings.

Based on written information of travelers M. Biberstein, S. Bronevski and others, some streets remained deserted when Fatali Khan forced the inhabitants to deportation. Agsu city was exposed to attacks the next years. Especially, when Aga Mohammad Shah Gajar's marched to Azerbaijan, the surviving inhabitants immigrated to Guba and other regions, non-survived were annihilated. So, Agsu City, which was founded by Nadir Shah, was decayed by Aga Mohammad Shah Gajar.

Agsu city was repeatedly exposed to feudal attacks in the 18th century. Frequent deportation and destruction made the inhabitants disappointed in living in the city. Therefore, the inhabitants did not prepare to construct glamorous buildings, tombs, mosques, bathrooms, social and official buildings. In 1967, Agsu was entitled to city-type settlement status, in the same year it was entitled with city status.

Agsu has been operated as an administrative-territorial district since October 8, 1943.

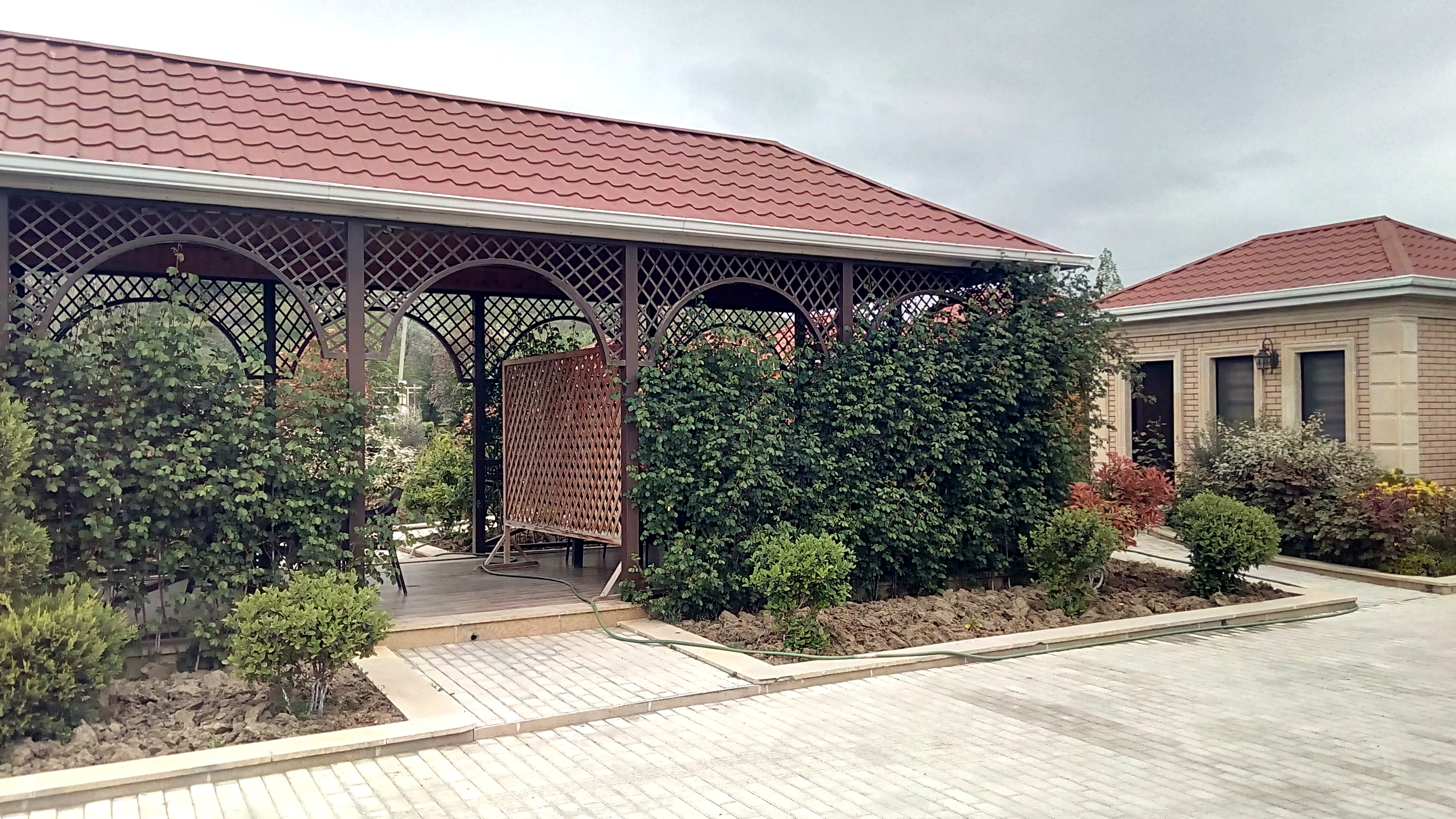
Ağsu - Nur Restoran 23.04.2021

== Culture ==
=== Sports ===
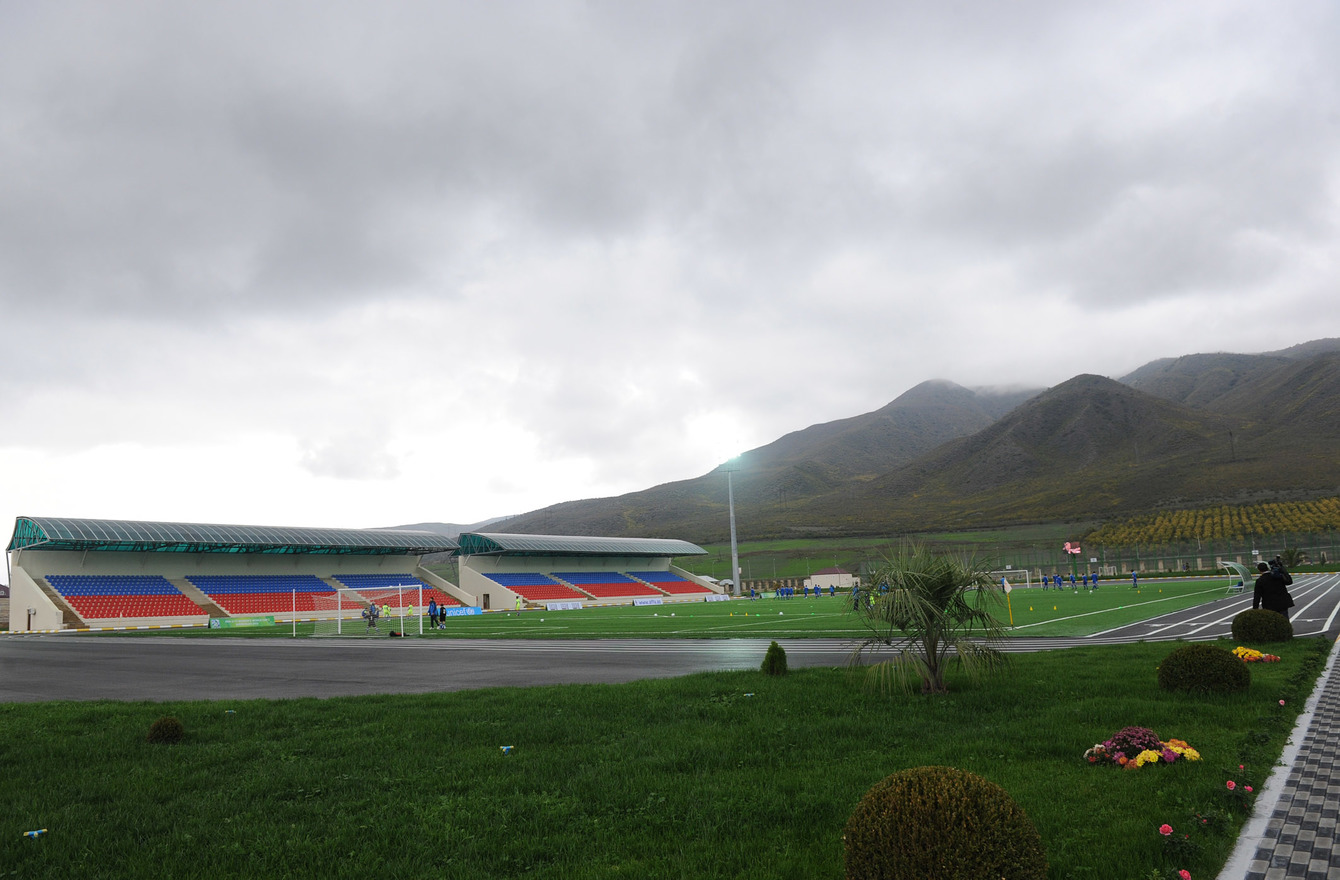
Agsu City Stadium is a multi-use stadium

The city has one professional football team, Ağsu, currently competing in the second-flight of Azerbaijani football, the Azerbaijan First Division.

=== Notable Residents ===
Rasim Balayev - (8 August 1948 – 29 March 2026) was an Azerbaijani film and stage actor.
