= Bayil Arena =

Stadium in Bayil, Baku, Azerbaijan

Coordinates: 40.332217°N 49.817664°E

- Interactive map of Bayil Arena
- Full name: Bayil Arena
- Location: Bayil, Baku, Azerbaijan
- Owner: AFFA
- Capacity: 3,290

Construction
- Opened: 2012

Tenant
- Sabail FK

Bayil Arena (Azerbaijani: Bayıl Arena) is a stadium in Bayil, Baku, Azerbaijan. It was opened in 2012 and has a capacity of 3,200 spectators. The stadium is owned and operated by AFFA. Yalchin Mammadov is a current stadium manager.

== History ==
The stadium was one of the venues for the group stages of the 2012 FIFA U-17 Women's World Cup. Three group matches were played there.

== See also ==
- List of football stadiums in Azerbaijan
