= Shovkat Ordukhanov Stadium =

Multi-use stadium in Qusar, Azerbaijan

Coordinates: 41.4219°N 48.4214°E

Şövkət Orduxanov Stadium is a multi-use stadium in Qusar, Azerbaijan. It is used mostly for football matches and is the home stadium of FC Sahdag Qusar. The stadium holds 5,000 people.
