= Yashar Mammadzade Stadium =

Stadium in Azerbaijan

Coordinates: 40°45′47″N 47°2′33″E

- Interactive map of Yashar Mammadzade Stadium
- Full name: Mingachevir City Stadium named after Yashar Mammadzade
- Location: Mingachevir, Azerbaijan
- Capacity: 5,000
- Surface: Grass
- Field size: 110x60

Construction
- Built: 1953

Tenant
- Energetik FC

Yashar Mammadzade Stadium is a multi-purpose stadium in Mingachevir, Azerbaijan. It is currently used mostly for football matches and is the home stadium of Energetik FC. The stadium holds 5,000 people.

== See also ==
- List of football stadiums in Azerbaijan
