= Qaradağ Lökbatan FK =

Azerbaijani football club

- Full name: Qaradağ Lökbatan Futbol Klubu
- Founded: 2008; 18 years ago as Neftchi-ISM
- Ground: Lökbatan Olympic Sport Complex Stadium
- Capacity: 2,500
- Chairman: Tahir Mustafayev
- Manager: Amit Guluzade
- League: Azerbaijan Second League
- 2025–26: 2nd

Qaradağ Lökbatan FK (Azerbaijani: Qaradağ Lökbatan Futbol Klubu) is an Azerbaijani football club based in Lökbatan. Qaradağ is the most successful club of Azerbaijan First League, being a two-time champion and four-time runner-up of the league.

== History ==
The club was established in 2009 under the name of Neftchi-ISM as Neftchi Baku's reserve team, and played in Azerbaijan First Division. The club became independent of Neftchi Baku in 2011 and was renamed to Qaradağ Lökbatan FK, which would allow them to participate in Premier League if they secured promotion from the First Division.

On 10 April 2012, the club finished top in the First Division, which would normally result in promotion to Azerbaijan Premier League, however the club did not meet the licensing requirements from the Professional Football Federation of Azerbaijan.

Qaradağ won the First League for the second time in its history in the 2021/22 season. Qaradağ was eliminated from Azerbaijan First League at the end of the 2024-25 season after coming in last place. In July 2025, the head coach position was assigned to Kamal Guliyev and the club began playing in Azerbaijan Second League. In August of the same year, the club parted ways with him, and Gazanfar Abbasov was appointed as the team's head coach. Amit Guluzade returned as the head coach for the 2026/27 season in Azerbaijan Second League.

== Stadium ==
Qaradağ plays at Lökbatan Olympic Sport Complex Stadium, a multi-use stadium in Lökbatan settlement of Baku, Azerbaijan. The stadium holds 2,500 people.

== Honours ==
- Azerbaijan First League

Winners (2): 2011–12, 2021-22
Runners-up (4):2012–13, 2015-16, 2017-18, 2023-24

- Azerbaijan Second League

Runner-up (1): 2025-26

== Current squad ==
As of 20 October 2026

Note: Flags indicate national team as defined under FIFA eligibility rules; some limited exceptions apply. Players may hold more than one non-FIFA nationality.

No.	Pos.	Nation	Player
1	GK	AZE	Amin Farhadzade
3	DF	AZE	Nijat Askerov
4	DF	AZE	Amin Aghayev
5	MF	AZE	Ibrahim Novruzov
6	DF	AZE	Isa Zeynalli
7	MF	AZE	Rahman Guliyev
8	MF	AZE	Ramil Orujov
9	MF	AZE	Tamraz Amirjanov
10	MF	AZE	Ilkin Aliyev
11	FW	AZE	Ali Alizade
14	MF	AZE	Huseyn Huseynli

No.	Pos.	Nation	Player
15	MF	AZE	Vusal Alizade
17	FW	AZE	Sabir Allahguliyev
19	MF	AZE	Ibrahim Bayramov
21	MF	AZE	Tural Akhverdiyev
22	DF	AZE	Kamil Mahmudov
27	FW	AZE	Ajdar Hajili
44	DF	AZE	Samir Ibrahimov
77	DF	AZE	Nurlan Bayramov
88	MF	AZE	Ravan Abasov
90	GK	AZE	Farman Bayramov

== Notable Players ==
- (Azerbaijan) Elnur Jafarov
- (Azerbaijan) Araz Abdullayev
- (Azerbaijan) Ruslan Poladov
- (Azerbaijan) Bahruz Teymurov
- (Azerbaijan) Rovshan Shahmuradov
- (Azerbaijan) Sabir Allahquliyev
- (Azerbaijan) Orxan Əliyev
- (Azerbaijan) Emin Mehdiyev
- (Azerbaijan) Ramal Hüseynov
- (Azerbaijan) Tural Qurbatov
