= 2012–13 in Azerbaijani football =

2012-13 season

Azerbaijani football in 2013

== Azerbaijan Premier League ==
Pos	Team	Pld	W	D	L	GF	GA	GD	Pts	Qualification
1	Neftçi Baku	22	14	2	6	47	24	+23	44	Qualification for championship group
2	Inter Baku	22	11	8	3	24	12	+12	41	Qualification for championship group
3	Qarabağ	22	10	9	3	30	19	+11	39	Qualification for championship group
4	Simurq	22	9	9	4	25	15	+10	36	Qualification for championship group
5	Gabala	22	9	5	8	26	27	−1	32	Qualification for championship group
6	Baku	22	6	12	4	24	15	+9	30	Qualification for championship group
7	AZAL	22	7	8	7	32	25	+7	29	Qualification for relegation group
8	Khazar Lankaran	22	7	7	8	32	27	+5	28	Qualification for relegation group
9	Turan	22	6	5	11	24	35	−11	23	Qualification for relegation group
10	Sumgayit	22	5	7	10	20	39	−19	22	Qualification for relegation group
11	Ravan Baku	22	6	4	12	23	36	−13	22	Qualification for relegation group
12	Kapaz	22	2	4	16	12	45	−33	10	Qualification for relegation group

Source: Association of Football Federations of Azerbaijan and Soccerway.com
Rules for classification: 1) points; 2) goal difference; 3) number of goals scored.

=== Championship group ===
Pos	Team	Pld	W	D	L	GF	GA	GD	Pts	Qualification
1	Neftçi Baku (C)	32	19	5	8	59	32	+27	62	Qualification for Champions League second qualifying round
2	Qarabağ	32	16	11	5	43	26	+17	59	Qualification for Europa League first qualifying round
3	Inter Baku	32	16	9	7	38	22	+16	57	Qualification for Europa League first qualifying round
4	Simurq	32	12	12	8	32	26	+6	48	
5	Baku	32	9	14	9	33	27	+6	41	
6	Gabala	32	10	8	14	32	40	−8	38	

Source: Soccerway.com
Rules for classification: 1) points; 2) goal difference; 3) number of goals scored.
(C) Champions

=== Relegation group ===
Pos	Team	Pld	W	D	L	GF	GA	GD	Pts	Qualification or relegation
7	AZAL	32	16	9	7	57	32	+25	57	
8	Khazar Lankaran	32	10	10	12	40	37	+3	40	Qualification for Europa League first qualifying round (Note: Khazar Lankaran qualified for the first qualifying round of the 2013–14 UEFA Europa League as winner of the 2012–13 Azerbaijan Cup.)
9	Ravan Baku	32	12	4	16	46	53	−7	40	
10	Sumgayit	32	9	8	15	31	49	−18	35	
11	Turan (R)	32	8	6	18	34	59	−25	30	Relegation to Azerbaijan First Division
12	Kapaz (R)	32	5	4	23	22	64	−42	19	Relegation to Azerbaijan First Division

Source: Association of Football Federations of Azerbaijan
Rules for classification: 1) points; 2) goal difference; 3) number of goals scored.
(R) Relegated

== Azerbaijan First Division ==
Pos	Team	Pld	W	D	L	GF	GA	GD	Pts
1	Ağsu (C)	24	20	3	1	65	18	+47	63
2	Qaradağ	24	20	3	1	61	8	+53	63
3	Neftchala	24	17	3	4	51	18	+33	54
4	Şahdağ	24	12	6	6	40	30	+10	42
5	MOIK Baku	24	11	6	7	39	28	+11	39
6	Tərəqqi	24	12	1	11	24	24	0	37
7	Bakili	24	7	7	10	30	38	−8	28
8	Lokomotiv-Bilajary	24	7	3	14	28	38	−10	24
9	Şuşa	24	7	2	15	29	40	−11	23
10	Energetik	24	5	4	15	26	52	−26	19
11	Qala	24	5	3	16	21	49	−28	18
12	Göyəzən	24	4	5	15	23	61	−38	17
13	Şəmkir	24	3	6	15	23	56	−33	15

Source: Soccerway
Rules for classification: 1) points; 2) goal difference; 3) number of goals scored.
(C) Champions

== Azerbaijan Cup ==
28 May 2013
20:00 AZST (UTC+5)

Neftchi Baku	0 – 0	Khazar
	[ Summary]
Penalties
Canales (penalty scored); Bruno (penalty scored); Flavinho (penalty scored); Shukurov (penalty scored); Sadiqov (penalty scored)	5 – 3	(penalty missed) Sialmas; (penalty scored) Ramazanov; (penalty scored) Amirguliyev; (penalty scored) Tounkara

Tofiq Bahramov Stadium, Baku
Attendance: 20,000
Referee: Aliyar Ağayev

== National team ==
15 August 2012 Friendly	Azerbaijan	3 – 0	Bahrain	Baku, Azerbaijan
18:00 AZST (UTC+5)	Subašić 35'; Özkara 59'; Huseynov 77'	(Report)		Stadium: Ismat Gayibov Stadium; Referee: George Vadatchkoria (Georgia)

7 September 2012 2014 WCQ	Azerbaijan	1 – 1	Israel	Baku, Azerbaijan
21:00 AZST (UTC+5)	Abishov 65'	(Report)	Natcho 50'	Stadium: Tofiq Bahramov Stadium; Attendance: 22,211; Referee: Matej Jug (Slovenia)

12 September 2012 2014 WCQ	Portugal	3 – 0	Azerbaijan	Braga, Portugal
00:15 AZST (UTC+5)	Varela 63'; Postiga 85'; Alves 88'	(Report)		Stadium: Estádio Municipal; Attendance: 29,971; Referee: Szymon Marciniak (Poland)

15 October 2012 2014 WCQ	Russia	1 – 0	Azerbaijan	Moscow, Russia
20:00 AZST (UTC+5)	Shirokov 84' (pen.)	(Report)		Stadium: Luzhniki Stadium; Attendance: 15,033; Referee: Aleksandar Stavrev (Macedonia)

14 November 2012 2014 WCQ	Northern Ireland	1 – 1	Azerbaijan	Belfast, Northern Ireland
23:45 AZT (UTC+4)	Healy 90+6'	(Report)	Aliyev 5'	Stadium: Windsor Park; Attendance: 12,372; Referee: Viktor Shvetsov (Ukraine)

1 February 2013 Friendly	Uzbekistan	0 – 0	Azerbaijan	Dubai, UAE
18:00 AZT (UTC+4)		(Report)		Stadium: The Sevens; Attendance: 100; Referee: Ammar Al Junaibi (UAE)

6 February 2013 Friendly	Azerbaijan	1 – 0	Liechtenstein	Dubai, UAE
18:00 AZT (UTC+4)	Javadov 75' (pen.)	(Report)	Erne (red card) 74'	Stadium: Za'abeel Stadium; Attendance: 67; Referee: Abdulla Ali Al Ajel Al Zaabi (UAE)

22 March 2013 2014 WCQ	Luxembourg	0 – 0	Azerbaijan	Luxembourg, Luxembourg
23:15 AZT (UTC+4)		Report		Stadium: Stade Josy Barthel; Attendance: 1,324; Referee: Padraigh Sutton (Republic of Ireland)

26 March 2013 2014 WCQ	Azerbaijan	0 – 2	Portugal	Baku, Azerbaijan
21:00 AZT (UTC+4)	Aliyev (yellow card) 51' (yellow-red card) 56'	(Report)	Alves 63'; Almeida 79'	Stadium: Tofiq Bahramov Republican Stadium; Attendance: 24,558; Referee: Andre Marriner (England)

29 May 2013 Friendly	Qatar	1 – 1	Azerbaijan	Doha, Qatar
21:15	Khalfan Ibrahim 33' (pen.)	(Report)	Dadashov 89'	Stadium: Jassim Bin Hamad Stadium; Attendance: 9,172; Referee: Wahid Tamuni Salah (Libya)

7 June 2013 2014 WCQ	Azerbaijan	1 – 1	Luxembourg	Baku, Azerbaijan
21:00 AZST (UTC+5)	Abishov 71'; Subašić (red card) 84'	(Report)	Bensi 81'	Stadium: Eighth Kilometer District Stadium; Attendance: 9,258; Referee: Mihaly Fabian (Hungary)

=== Goal scorers ===
Place	Position	Name	Friendlies	WC Qualifying	Total
1	DF	Ruslan Abishov	2	0	2
2	FW	Branimir Subašić	0	1	1
2	FW	Cihan Özkara	0	1	1
2	FW	Javid Huseynov	0	1	1
2	FW	Rauf Aliyev	1	0	1
2	FW	Vagif Javadov	0	1	1
2	FW	Rufat Dadashov	0	1	1
		TOTALS	3	5	8

== Azerbaijani clubs in Europe ==
=== UEFA Champions League ===
==== Second qualifying round ====
Team 1	Agg.	Team 2	1st leg	2nd leg
Neftchi Baku (Azerbaijan)	5–2	(Georgia (country)) Zestafoni	3–0	2–2

==== Third qualifying round ====
Team 1	Agg.	Team 2	1st leg	2nd leg
Ironi Kiryat Shmona (Israel)	6–2	(Azerbaijan) Neftchi Baku	4–0	2–2

=== UEFA Europa League ===
==== First qualifying round ====
Team 1	Agg.	Team 2	1st leg	2nd leg
Narva Trans (Estonia)	0–7	(Azerbaijan) Inter Baku	0–5	0–2

Team 1	Agg.	Team 2	1st leg	2nd leg
Baku (Azerbaijan)	0–2	(Slovenia) Mura 05	0–0	0–2

Team 1	Agg.	Team 2	1st leg	2nd leg
Khazar Lankaran (Azerbaijan)	4–2	(Estonia) Nõmme Kalju	2–2	2–0

==== Second qualifying round ====
Team 1	Agg.	Team 2	1st leg	2nd leg
Khazar Lankaran (Azerbaijan)	1–2	(Poland) Lech Poznań	1–1	0–1

Team 1	Agg.	Team 2	1st leg	2nd leg
Inter Baku (Azerbaijan)	2–2 (2–4p)	(Greece) Asteras Tripolis	1–1	1–1 (a.e.t.)

==== Play-off round ====
Team 1	Agg.	Team 2	1st leg	2nd leg
Neftchi Baku (Azerbaijan)	4–2	(Cyprus) APOEL	1–1	3–1

==== Group stage ====
===== Group H =====
Pos	Team	Pld	W	D	L	GF	GA	GD	Pts	Qualification	RUB	INT	PAR	NEF
1	(Russia) Rubin Kazan	6	4	2	0	10	3	+7	14	Advance to knockout phase	—	3–0	2–0	1–0
2	(Italy) Internazionale	6	3	2	1	11	9	+2	11	Advance to knockout phase	2–2	—	1–0	2–2
3	(Serbia) Partizan	6	0	3	3	3	8	−5	3 (Note: Tied on head-to-head points (2) and head-to-head goal difference (0). Head-to-head away goals: Partizan 1, Neftçi 0.)		1–1	1–3	—	0–0
4	(Azerbaijan) Neftçi	6	0	3	3	4	8	−4	3		0–1	1–3	1–1	—

Source: Soccerway
