= 2012–13 FK Khazar Lankaran season =

Khazar Lankaran
2012–13 season
- President: Mubariz Mansimov
- Manager: Yunis Huseinov; Until 31 October 2012; Erik Roqueta Capilla; Caretaker 1–14 November 2012; Carles Martorell Baqués; 14 November 2012 – 26 February 2013; John Toshack; 15 March 2013 –
- Stadium: Lankaran City Stadium
- Premier League: 8th
- Azerbaijan Cup: Runners-up vs Neftchi Baku
- Europa League: Second Qualifying Round vs Lech Poznań
- Top goalscorer: League: Dimitris Sialmas (6); All: Branimir Subasic (8)
- Highest home attendance: 15,500 vs Nõmme Kalju; 5 July 2012
- Lowest home attendance: 1,000 vs Simurq; 20 September 2012
- Average home league attendance: 6,295
| Home colours | Away colours |

The Khazar Lankaran 2012–13 season is Khazar Lankaran's eighth Azerbaijan Premier League season. Khazar Lankaran finished in 8th place in the league, after competing in the Relegation Championship during the second half of the season. They also reached the final of the Azerbaijan Cup, eventually losing to Neftchi Baku on penalties after a 0–0 draw. They competed in the 2012–13 UEFA Europa League, getting knocked out by Lech Poznań of Poland at the second qualifying round stage having previously defeated Nõmme Kalju of Estonia, 4–2, in the first qualifying round. Khazar started the season under Yunis Huseinov, until he resigned on 31 October 2012. Erik Roqueta Capilla was appointed as their caretaker manager on 1 November 2012. On 14 November 2012, Carles Martorell Baqués was appointed as the club's permanent manager, replacing caretaker manager Erik Roqueta Capilla. Baqués resigned as manager on 26 February 2013. On 8 March 2013 John Toshack was announced as the new manager, taking over from 15 March 2013.

== Squad ==
As of 23 April 2013

Note: Flags indicate national team as defined under FIFA eligibility rules; some limited exceptions apply. Players may hold more than one non-FIFA nationality.

| No. | Pos. | Nation | Player |
|---|---|---|---|
| 2 | DF | AZE | Elnur Allahverdiyev |
| 3 | DF | BRA | Vanderson |
| 4 | DF | ESP | Álvaro Silva |
| 7 | MF | MLI | Sadio Tounkara |
| 8 | DF | BRA | Éder Bonfim |
| 9 | MF | AZE | Uğur Pamuk |
| 10 | MF | AZE | Elnur Abdullayev |
| 11 | FW | GRE | Dimitris Sialmas |
| 14 | MF | AZE | Rahid Amirguliyev (captain) |
| 16 | MF | ROU | Adrian Piț |
| 17 | MF | AZE | Kazım Kazımlı |

| No. | Pos. | Nation | Player |
|---|---|---|---|
| 21 | DF | BUL | Radomir Todorov |
| 24 | FW | TUR | Gökhan Güleç |
| 25 | GK | AZE | Orkhan Sadigli |
| 27 | DF | ROU | Adrian Scarlatache |
| 30 | GK | ESP | Toni Doblas |
| 35 | FW | ARG | Luciano Olguín |
| 42 | MF | AZE | Kamran Abdullazadeh |
| 55 | FW | AZE | Aghabala Ramazanov |
| 97 | FW | AZE | Elnur Jafarov |
| 99 | MF | CRO | Marin Oršulić |

== Transfers ==
=== Summer ===
In: Note: Flags indicate national team as defined under FIFA eligibility rules; some limited exceptions apply. Players may hold more than one non-FIFA nationality.

| No. | Pos. | Nation | Player |
|---|---|---|---|
| 3 | DF | BRA | Vanderson Scardovelli (from (Greece) PAS Giannina) |
| 11 | FW | GRE | Dimitris Sialmas (from (Greece) AEK Athens) |
| 15 | DF | AZE | Ruslan Abishov (from (Azerbaijan) Neftchi Baku) |
| 27 | DF | ROU | Adrian Scarlatache (from (Romania) Dinamo București) |
| 99 | FW | BRA | Beto (from (Turkey) Mersin İdman Yurdu) |
| 55 | FW | AZE | Aghabala Ramazanov (from (Azerbaijan) Neftchi Baku) |
| 1 | GK | AZE | Kamran Agayev (resigned with (Azerbaijan) Khazar Lankaran) |

Out: Note: Flags indicate national team as defined under FIFA eligibility rules; some limited exceptions apply. Players may hold more than one non-FIFA nationality.

| No. | Pos. | Nation | Player |
|---|---|---|---|
| 1 | GK | AZE | Kamran Agayev (released, resigned with (Azerbaijan) Khazar Lankaran) |
| 3 | DF | ALB | Elvin Beqiri (to (Albania) Vllaznia Shkodër) |
| 7 | MF | ROU | Cătălin Doman (to (Romania) Argeș Pitești) |
| 11 | MF | ROU | Andrei Mureşan (to (Romania) Astra Ploiești) |
| 11 | FW | CRC | Randall Brenes (to (Costa Rica) Cartaginés). |
| 12 | MF | MLI | Salif Ballo (to (Azerbaijan) Turan Tovuz) |
| 18 | MF | AZE | Alim Qurbanov (Retired]) |
| 22 | MF | POR | António Semedo (Retired) |
| 23 | DF | AZE | Shahriyar Khalilov (to (Azerbaijan) Gabala) |
| 33 | DF | SRB | Stevan Bates (Loan return to (Serbia) FK Rad) |
| 81 | MF | BRA | Ricardo Gomes (to FC Andorra August 2013) |

=== Winter ===
In: Note: Flags indicate national team as defined under FIFA eligibility rules; some limited exceptions apply. Players may hold more than one non-FIFA nationality.

| No. | Pos. | Nation | Player |
|---|---|---|---|
| 4 | DF | ESP | Álvaro Silva (from (Spain) Xerez) |
| 9 | MF | AZE | Uğur Pamuk (from (Azerbaijan) Sumgayit) |
| 24 | FW | TUR | Gökhan Güleç (from (Turkey) Şanlıurfaspor) |
| 30 | GK | ESP | Toni Doblas (from (Spain) Real Zaragoza) |
| 35 | FW | ARG | Luciano Olguín (from (China) Shenyang Dongjin) |
| 99 | MF | CRO | Marin Oršulić (from (Croatia) NK Zagreb) |

Out: Note: Flags indicate national team as defined under FIFA eligibility rules; some limited exceptions apply. Players may hold more than one non-FIFA nationality.

| No. | Pos. | Nation | Player |
|---|---|---|---|
| 1 | GK | AZE | Kamran Agayev (to (Azerbaijan) Baku) |
| 4 | MF | AZE | Akif Taghiyev |
| 6 | MF | CRO | Robert Alviž (to (Kazakhstan) FC Atyrau) |
| 9 | FW | AZE | Branimir Subašić (to (Azerbaijan) Qarabağ) |
| 85 | GK | AZE | Kamal Bayramov (to (Azerbaijan) Turan Tovuz) |
| 99 | FW | BRA | Beto |

== Competitions ==
=== Azerbaijan Premier League ===
==== Results summary ====
| Overall | | | | | | | | Home | | | | | | Away | | | | | |
| Pld | W | D | L | GF | GA | GD | Pts | W | D | L | GF | GA | GD | W | D | L | GF | GA | GD |
|---|---|---|---|---|---|---|---|---|---|---|---|---|---|---|---|---|---|---|---|
| 22 | 7 | 7 | 8 | 32 | 27 | +5 | 28 | 5 | 3 | 3 | 23 | 14 | +9 | 2 | 4 | 5 | 9 | 13 | −4 |

Last updated: 5 March 2013.
Source: Soccerway

==== Results by round ====
| Round | 1 | 2 | 3 | 4 | 5 | 6 | 7 | 8 | 9 | 10 | 11 | 12 | 13 | 14 | 15 | 16 | 17 | 18 | 19 | 20 | 21 | 22 |
|---|---|---|---|---|---|---|---|---|---|---|---|---|---|---|---|---|---|---|---|---|---|---|
| Ground | A | H | A | A | H | A | A | H | H | A | H | A | A | H | H | A | H | A | H | H | A | H |
| Result | D | W | D | L | L | L | W | D | W | D | W | L | W | L | D | D | W | L | L | W | L | D |
| Position | 4 | | 3 | 8 | 10 | 12 | 8 | 9 | 7 | 7 | 4 | 6 | 6 | 7 | 6 | 6 | 6 | 6 | 6 | 6 | 6 | 8 |

Source: Soccerway
A = Away; H = Home; W = Win; D = Draw; L = Loss

==== Results ====
| 3 August 2012 1 | Ravan Baku | 1–1 | Khazar Lankaran | Baku |
| 20:00 AZST (UTC+5) | Bundu 10' | Summary | Subašić 55' | Stadium: Dalga Arena; Attendance: 600; Referee: Vusal Aliyev |

| 10 August 2012 2 | Khazar Lankaran | 4–0 | Kəpəz | Lankaran |
| 19:30 AZST (UTC+5) | Scarlatache 15'; Abishov 21'; Piţ 35'; Alviž 38' | Summary | | Stadium: Lankaran City Stadium; Attendance: 5,500; Referee: Rahim Hasanov |

| 19 August 2012 3 | Inter | 0–0 | Khazar Lankaran | Baku |
| 18:30 AZST (UTC+5) | | Summary | | Stadium: Shafa Stadium; Attendance: 1,500; Referee: Aliyar Agayev |

| 24 August 2012 4 | Khazar Lankaran | Postponed | Simurq | Lankaran |
| AZST (UTC+5) | | Summary | | Stadium: Lankaran City Stadium |

| 15 September 2012 5 | Neftchi | 2–1 | Khazar Lankaran | Baku |
| 17:00 AZST (UTC+5) | Canales 17'; Flavinho 74' | Summary | Tounkara 8' | Stadium: Ismat Gayibov Stadium; Attendance: 4,500; Referee: Fariz Yusifov |

| 20 September 2012 4 | Khazar Lankaran | 0–2 | Simurq | Lankaran |
| 17:00 AZST (UTC+5) | | Summary | Burkhardt 17'; Poljak 49' | Stadium: Lankaran City Stadium; Attendance: 1,000; Referee: Elchin Mämmädov |

| 23 September 2012 6 | Khazar Lankaran | Postponed | Baku | Lankaran |
| AZST (UTC+5) | | Report | | Stadium: Lankaran City Stadium |

| 29 September 2012 7 | Turan | 2–1 | Khazar Lankaran | Tovuz |
| 16:00 AZST (UTC+5) | Ballo 55', 58' | Summary | Abishov (red card) 23'; Tounkara 45'; Allahverdiyev (yellow card) 77' (red card) 78' | Stadium: Tovuz City Stadium; Attendance: 2,400; Referee: Rahim Hasanov |

| 3 October 2012 8 | AZAL | 0–2 | Khazar Lankaran | Baku |
| 18:30 AZST (UTC+5) | | Summary | Scarlatache 40', 45' | Stadium: AZAL Stadium; Attendance: 1,500; Referee: Aliyar Ağayev |

| 20 October 2012 9 | Khazar Lankaran | 1–1 | Gabala | Lankaran |
| 17:15 AZST (UTC+5) | Alviž 76' (pen.) | Summary | Kamanan 22' | Stadium: Lankaran City Stadium; Attendance: 6,000; Referee: Rauf Jabbarov |

| 27 October 2012 10 | Khazar Lankaran | 2–0 | Qarabağ | Lankaran |
| 16:00 AZST (UTC+5) | Sialmas 36', 62' | Summary | Medvedev (yellow card) 40' (yellow-red card) 52' | Stadium: Lankaran City Stadium; Attendance: 6,000; Referee: Fariz Yusifov |

| 31 October 2012 11 | Sumgayit | 1–1 | Khazar Lankaran | Sumgayit |
| 16:00 AZT (UTC+4) | Hajiyev 53' | Summary | K. Kazımlı 74' | Stadium: Mehdi Huseynzade Stadium; Attendance: 1,800; Referee: Aliyar Ağayev |

| 4 November 2012 12 | Khazar Lankaran | 4–0 | Ravan Baku | Lankaran |
| 16:00 AZT (UTC+4) | Piț 10'; Sialmas 12', 69'; Tounkara 33' | Summary | | Stadium: Lankaran City Stadium; Attendance: 7,200; Referee: Vusal Äliyev |

| 18 November 2012 13 | Baku | 2–0 | Khazar Lankaran | Baku |
| 14:00 AZT (UTC+4) | Juninho 6'; Rodríguez 55' | Summary | | Stadium: Tofig Bakhramov Stadium; Attendance: 1,500; Referee: Fariz Yusifov |

| 24 November 2012 14 | Kəpəz | 0–1 | Khazar Lankaran | Ganja |
| 14:00 AZT (UTC+4) | | Summary | Subašić 8' (pen.) | Stadium: Ganja City Stadium; Attendance: 2,000; Referee: Vusal Äliyev |

| 2/3 December 2012^{1} 15 | Khazar Lankaran | 1–2 | AZAL | Lankaran |
| 14:00 AZT (UTC+4) | Subašić 21' | Summary | R.Tagizade 11'; Benouahi 80' | Stadium: Lankaran City Stadium; Attendance: 2,000; Referee: Rahim Häsänov |

| 6 December 2012 6 | Khazar Lankaran | 1–1 | Baku | Lankaran |
| 16:00 AZT (UTC+4) | Amirguliyev 83' | Report | Šolić 77' | Stadium: Lankaran City Stadium; Attendance: 6,500; Referee: Vusal Aliyev |

| 10 December 2012 16 | Simurq | 2–2 | Khazar Lankaran | Zaqatala |
| 16:00 AZT (UTC+4) | Sattarly 15'; Burkhardt 67' | Summary | Abishov (red card) 48'; Abdullayev 73'; A.Shemonayev 90+4' (o.g.) | Stadium: Zaqatala City Stadium; Attendance: 2,000; Referee: Aliyar Ağayev |

| 14 December 2012 17 | Khazar Lankaran | 2–1 | Neftchi | Lankaran |
| 16:00 AZT (UTC+4) | Sialmas 7'; Pit 83' | Summary | Canales 52' (pen.) | Stadium: Lankaran City Stadium; Attendance: 9,500; Referee: Fariz Yusifov |

| 20 December 2012 18 | Qarabağ | 1–0 | Khazar Lankaran | Quzanlı |
| 16:00 AZT (UTC+4) | Nadirov 73' | Summary | | Stadium: Guzanli Olympic Complex Stadium; Attendance: 700; Referee: Aliyar Ağayev |

| 11 February 2013 19 | Khazar Lankaran | 2–3 | Inter | Lankaran |
| 16:00 AZT (UTC+4) | Pamuk 52'; A.Ramazanov 83' | Summary | Mammadov 5'; Tskhadadze 30'; Zargarov 82' | Stadium: Lankaran City Stadium; Attendance: 11,000; Referee: Rahim Häsänov |

| 17 February 2013 20 | Khazar Lankaran | 4–2 | Turan | Lankaran |
| 16:00 AZT (UTC+4) | Scarlatache 4', 40'; Güleç 45+2'; Tounkara 82' | Summary | Ballo 43'; Günlü 62' | Stadium: Lankaran City Stadium; Attendance: 9,500; Referee: Elchin Mämmädov |

| 22 February 2013 21 | Gabala | 2–0 | Khazar Lankaran | Qabala |
| 15:00 AZT (UTC+4) | Kamanan 1', 87' | Summary | Vanderson (red card) 89' | Stadium: Gabala City Stadium; Attendance: 1,700; Referee: Fariz Yusifov |

| 3 March 2013 22 | Khazar Lankaran | 2–2 | Sumgayit | Lankaran |
| 15:00 AZT (UTC+4) | Alviž 14' (pen.), 66' (pen.) | Summary | Mirzaga Huseynpur 4'; Aliyev 47' | Stadium: Lankaran City Stadium; Attendance: 5,500; Referee: Ramil Diniyev |

==== League table ====
| Pos | Team | Pld | W | D | L | GF | GA | GD | Pts | Qualification |
|---|---|---|---|---|---|---|---|---|---|---|
| 6 | Baku | 22 | 6 | 12 | 4 | 24 | 15 | +9 | 30 | Qualification for championship group |
| 7 | AZAL | 22 | 7 | 8 | 7 | 32 | 25 | +7 | 29 | Qualification for relegation group |
| 8 | Khazar Lankaran | 22 | 7 | 7 | 8 | 32 | 27 | +5 | 28 | Qualification for relegation group |
| 9 | Turan | 22 | 6 | 5 | 11 | 24 | 35 | −11 | 23 | Qualification for relegation group |
| 10 | Sumgayit | 22 | 5 | 7 | 10 | 20 | 39 | −19 | 22 | Qualification for relegation group |

Source: Association of Football Federations of Azerbaijan and Soccerway.com
Rules for classification: 1) points; 2) goal difference; 3) number of goals scored.
- Note 1: The match was originally played on 2 December 2012 but suspended in 54th minute at 1-1 due to fog. The remaining minutes were played the next day.

=== Azerbaijan Premier League Relegation Group ===
==== Results summary ====
| Overall | | | | | | | | Home | | | | | | Away | | | | | |
| Pld | W | D | L | GF | GA | GD | Pts | W | D | L | GF | GA | GD | W | D | L | GF | GA | GD |
|---|---|---|---|---|---|---|---|---|---|---|---|---|---|---|---|---|---|---|---|
| 10 | 3 | 3 | 4 | 8 | 10 | −2 | 12 | 2 | 2 | 1 | 4 | 3 | +1 | 1 | 1 | 3 | 4 | 7 | −3 |

Last updated: 23 May 2013.
Source: Soccerway

==== Results by round ====
| Round | 1 | 2 | 3 | 4 | 5 | 6 | 7 | 8 | 9 | 10 |
|---|---|---|---|---|---|---|---|---|---|---|
| Ground | A | H | A | A | H | A | H | H | A | H |
| Result | L | D | W | D | D | L | W | W | L | L |
| Position | 8 | 8 | 8 | 9 | 8 | 9 | 8 | 8 | 8 | 8 |

Updated to match(es) played on 23 May 2013. Source: Soccerway
A = Away; H = Home; W = Win; D = Draw; L = Loss

==== Results ====
| 12 March 2013 23 | Ravan Baku | 1–0 | Khazar Lankaran | Baku |
| 15:00 AZT (UTC+4) | Varea 90' (pen.) | Summary | Abdullayev (yellow card) 56' (yellow-red card) 74' | Stadium: Dalga Arena; Attendance: 300; Referee: Aliyar Ağayev |

| 30 March 2013 24 | Khazar Lankaran | 1–1 | AZAL | Lankaran |
| 18:00 AZT (UTC+4) | Silva 34' | Summary | Kļava 23'; Aílton (yellow card) 20' (yellow-red card) 72' | Stadium: Lankaran City Stadium; Attendance: 5,500; Referee: Ramil Diniyev |

| 6 April 2013 25 | Kəpəz | 1–2 | Khazar Lankaran | Baku |
| 16:00 AZST (UTC+5) | E.Hasanaliyev 90+2' | Summary | Sialmas 30'; Piț 45+1' | Stadium: Dalga Arena; Attendance: 200; Referee: Elchin Mämmädov |

| 13 April 2013 26 | Turan Tovuz | 2–2 | Khazar Lankaran | Baku |
| 17:00 AZST (UTC+5) | Rukavina 22'; Günlü 69' | Summary | Abdullayev 42'; Alviž 67' (pen.) | Stadium: Dalga Arena; Attendance: 300; Referee: Elvin Äsgärov |

| 21 April 2013 27 | Khazar Lankaran | 0–0 | Sumgayit | Lankaran |
| 19:00 AZST (UTC+5) | Sialmas (yellow card) 89' (yellow-red card) 90+2' | Summary | Taktak (yellow card) 27' (yellow-red card) 86' | Stadium: Lankaran City Stadium; Attendance: 2,000; Referee: Orkhan Mämmädov |

| 28 April 2013 28 | AZAL | 2–0 | Khazar Lankaran | Baku |
| 18:00 AZST (UTC+5) | Igbekoi 21'; Tagiyev 64' | Summary | Allahverdiyev (red card) 45' | Stadium: AZAL Arena; Attendance: 650; Referee: Rauf Jabbarov |

| 3 May 2013 29 | Khazar Lankaran | 1–0 | Kəpəz | Lankaran |
| 19:00 AZST (UTC+5) | Tounkara 50' | Summary | | Stadium: Lankaran City Stadium; Attendance: 2,700; Referee: Orkhan Mämmädov |

| 8 May 2013 30 | Khazar Lankaran | 1–0 | Turan Tovuz | Lankaran |
| 19:00 AZST (UTC+5) | Kazımlı 43' | Summary | | Stadium: Lankaran City Stadium; Attendance: 3,500; Referee: Ramil Diniyev |

| 13 May 2013 31 | Sumgayit | 1–0 | Khazar Lankaran | Baku |
| 17:30 AZST (UTC+5) | Gurbanov 14' | Summary | Scarlatache (yellow card) 50' (yellow-red card) 61' | Stadium: Bayil Stadium; Attendance: 250 |

| 20 May 2013 32 | Khazar Lankaran | 1–2 | Ravan Baku | Lankaran |
| 19:00 AZST (UTC+5) | Güleç 70' | Summary | Adamović 23'; Hashimzade (yellow card) 60' (yellow-red card) 68'; Kalonas 89' | Stadium: Lankaran City Stadium; Attendance: 3,000; Referee: Vusal Äliyev |

==== Table ====
| Pos | Team | Pld | W | D | L | GF | GA | GD | Pts | Qualification or relegation |
|---|---|---|---|---|---|---|---|---|---|---|
| 7 | AZAL | 32 | 16 | 9 | 7 | 57 | 32 | +25 | 57 | |
| 8 | Khazar Lankaran | 32 | 10 | 10 | 12 | 40 | 37 | +3 | 40 | Qualification for Europa League first qualifying round (Note: Khazar Lankaran qualified for the first qualifying round of the 2013–14 UEFA Europa League as winner of the 2012–13 Azerbaijan Cup.) |
| 9 | Ravan Baku | 32 | 12 | 4 | 16 | 46 | 53 | −7 | 40 | |
| 10 | Sumgayit | 32 | 9 | 8 | 15 | 31 | 49 | −18 | 35 | |
| 11 | Turan (R) | 32 | 8 | 6 | 18 | 34 | 59 | −25 | 30 | Relegation to Azerbaijan First Division |

Source: Association of Football Federations of Azerbaijan
Rules for classification: 1) points; 2) goal difference; 3) number of goals scored.
(R) Relegated

=== Azerbaijan Cup ===
| 28 November 2012 Second Round | Turan Tovuz | 1–1 (a.e.t.) (4–5 p) | Khazar Lankaran | Tovuz |
| 13:00 AZST (UTC+4) | F.Aliyev 2'; Popoviç (red card) 90+3' | Summary | Subašić 90+3' (pen.); Abdullayev (red card) 116' | Stadium: Tovuz City Stadium; Attendance: 1,500; Referee: Fariz Yusifov |
| | Penalties |
| | Penalty scored Penalty missed | | Penalty scored |

| 27 February 2013 Quarterfinals 1st leg | Ravan Baku | 1–2 | Khazar Lankaran | Baku |
| 17:00 AZST (UTC+4) | Zečević 6' | Summary | Amirguliyev 74'; Pamuk 80' | Stadium: Dalga Arena; Attendance: 1,200; Referee: Rauf Jabbarov |

| 7 March 2013 Quarterfinals 2nd leg | Khazar Lankaran | 4–1 (6–2 agg.) | Ravan Baku | Lankaran |
| 17:00 AZST (UTC+4) | A.Ramazanov 8', 81' (pen.), 90+2'; Olguín 28' | Summary | Adamović 69' | Stadium: Lankaran City Stadium; Attendance: 5,000; Referee: Orkhan Mammadov |

| 17 April 2013 Semifinals 1st Leg | Baku | 1–0 | Khazar Lankaran | Baku |
| 16:00 AZST (UTC+5) | Pena 84' (pen.) | Summary | | Stadium: Tofig Bakhramov Stadium; Attendance: 1,600; Referee: Vusal Äliyev |

| 24 April 2013 Semifinals 2nd Leg | Khazar Lankaran | 2–0 (2–1 agg.) | Baku | Lankaran |
| 19:00 AZST (UTC+5) | A.Ramazanov 45+1'; Amirguliyev 82' | Summary | | Stadium: Lankaran City Stadium; Attendance: 10,000; Referee: Elchin Mämmädov |

| 28 May 2013 Final | Neftchi Baku | 0–0 (a.e.t.) (5–3 p) | Khazar Lankaran | Baku |
| 20:00 AZST (UTC+5) | | Summary | | Stadium: Tofiq Bahramov Stadium; Attendance: 22,000; Referee: Aliyar Agayev |
| | Penalties |
| | Canales (penalty scored); Bertucci (penalty scored); Flavinho (penalty scored); Shukurov (penalty scored); Sadiqov (penalty scored) | | (penalty missed) Sialmas; (penalty scored) A.Ramazanov; (penalty scored) Amirguliyev; (penalty scored) Tounkara |

=== UEFA Europa League ===
==== First qualifying round ====
| 5 July 2012 1st Leg | Khazar Lankaran (Azerbaijan) | 2–2 | (Estonia) Nõmme Kalju | Lankaran, Azerbaijan |
| 20:00 AZST (UTC+5) | Subašić 7'; Scarlatache 30' | Report | Wakui 5'; Puri 70' | Stadium: Lankaran City Stadium; Attendance: 15,500; Referee: Mitja Žganec (Slovenia) |

| 10 July 2012 2nd Leg | Nõmme Kalju (Estonia) | 0–2 (2–4 agg.) | (Azerbaijan) Khazar Lankaran | Tallinn, Estonia |
| 20:45 AZST (UTC+5) | | Report | Abishov 40'; Subašić 86' | Stadium: Kadrioru Stadium; Attendance: 1,281; Referee: Dag Vidar Hafsås (Norway) |

==== Second qualifying round ====
| 19 July 2012 1st Leg | Khazar Lankaran (Azerbaijan) | 1–1 | (Poland) Lech Poznań | Lankaran, Azerbaijan |
| 20:00 AZST (UTC+5) | Subašić 5' | Report | Możdżeń 19'; Drewniak (yellow card) 56' (yellow-red card) 90+1' | Stadium: Lankaran City Stadium; Attendance: 12,000; Referee: Robert Schörgenhofer (Austria) |

| 26 July 2012 2nd Leg | Lech Poznań (Poland) | 1–0 (2–1 agg.) | (Azerbaijan) Khazar Lankaran | Poznań, Poland |
| 23:00 AZST (UTC+5) | Tonev 15' | Report | Amirguliyev (yellow card) 43' (yellow-red card) 90+1' | Stadium: Stadion Miejski; Attendance: 25,840; Referee: Stanislav Todorov (Bulgaria) |

== Squad statistics ==
As of 29 May 2013

=== Appearances and goals ===
| No. | Pos | Nat | Player | Total | | Premier League | | Azerbaijan Cup | | Europa League | |
| No. | Pos | Nat | Player | Apps | Goals | Apps | Goals | Apps | Goals | Apps | Goals |
|---|---|---|---|---|---|---|---|---|---|---|---|
| 3 | DF | (Brazil) BRA | Vanderson | 24 | 0 | 15+3 | 0 | 5+1 | 0 | 0+0 | 0 |
| 4 | DF | (Spain) ESP | Álvaro Silva | 15 | 1 | 11+0 | 1 | 4+0 | 0 | 0+0 | 0 |
| 5 | DF | (Azerbaijan) AZE | Elnur Allahverdiyev | 30 | 0 | 21+0 | 0 | 6+0 | 0 | 3+0 | 0 |
| 7 | MF | (Mali) MLI | Sadio Tounkara | 37 | 5 | 22+7 | 5 | 2+2 | 0 | 4+0 | 0 |
| 8 | MF | (Brazil) BRA | Éder Bonfim | 23 | 0 | 14+1 | 0 | 2+2 | 0 | 4+0 | 0 |
| 9 | MF | (Azerbaijan) AZE | Uğur Pamuk | 15 | 2 | 6+4 | 1 | 2+3 | 1 | 0+0 | 0 |
| 10 | MF | (Azerbaijan) AZE | Elnur Abdullayev | 31 | 2 | 18+8 | 2 | 3+0 | 0 | 1+1 | 0 |
| 11 | FW | (Greece) GRE | Dimitris Sialmas | 24 | 6 | 14+7 | 6 | 1+2 | 0 | 0+0 | 0 |
| 14 | DF | (Azerbaijan) AZE | Rahid Amirguliyev | 40 | 3 | 29+1 | 1 | 6+0 | 2 | 4+0 | 0 |
| 16 | MF | (Romania) ROU | Adrian Piţ | 37 | 4 | 28+0 | 4 | 5+0 | 0 | 4+0 | 0 |
| 17 | MF | (Azerbaijan) AZE | Kazım Kazımlı | 13 | 2 | 3+9 | 2 | 0+1 | 0 | 0+0 | 0 |
| 21 | DF | (Bulgaria) BUL | Radomir Todorov | 33 | 0 | 26+0 | 0 | 4+0 | 0 | 3+0 | 0 |
| 24 | FW | (Turkey) TUR | Gökhan Güleç | 13 | 2 | 6+5 | 2 | 2+0 | 0 | 0+0 | 0 |
| 25 | GK | (Azerbaijan) AZE | Orkhan Sadigli | 28 | 0 | 25+0 | 0 | 3+0 | 0 | 0+0 | 0 |
| 27 | DF | (Romania) ROU | Adrian Scarlatache | 37 | 6 | 27+0 | 5 | 6+0 | 0 | 4+0 | 1 |
| 30 | GK | (Spain) ESP | Toni Doblas | 10 | 0 | 6+1 | 0 | 3+0 | 0 | 0+0 | 0 |
| 35 | FW | (Argentina) ARG | Luciano Olguín | 8 | 1 | 3+2 | 0 | 1+2 | 1 | 0+0 | 0 |
| 42 | MF | (Azerbaijan) AZE | Kamran Abdullazada | 5 | 0 | 1+4 | 0 | 0+0 | 0 | 0+0 | 0 |
| 55 | FW | (Azerbaijan) AZE | Aghabala Ramazanov | 24 | 5 | 7+12 | 1 | 4+1 | 4 | 0+0 | 0 |
| 97 | FW | (Azerbaijan) AZE | Elnur Jafarov | 2 | 0 | 1+1 | 0 | 0+0 | 0 | 0+0 | 0 |
| 99 | MF | (Croatia) CRO | Marin Oršulić | 17 | 0 | 10+3 | 0 | 4+0 | 0 | 0+0 | 0 |
Players who appeared for Khazar no longer at the club:
| 1 | GK | (Azerbaijan) AZE | Kamran Agayev | 4 | 0 | 0+0 | 0 | 0+0 | 0 | 4+0 | 0 |
| 4 | MF | (Azerbaijan) AZE | Akif Taghiyev | 3 | 0 | 0+3 | 0 | 0+0 | 0 | 0+0 | 0 |
| 6 | MF | (Croatia) CRO | Robert Alviž | 30 | 5 | 22+1 | 5 | 1+2 | 0 | 4+0 | 0 |
| 9 | FW | (Azerbaijan) AZE | Branimir Subašić | 22 | 7 | 17+0 | 3 | 1+0 | 1 | 4+0 | 3 |
| 11 | FW | (Costa Rica) CRC | Randall Brenes | 4 | 0 | 0+0 | 0 | 0+0 | 0 | 1+3 | 0 |
| 15 | DF | (Azerbaijan) AZE | Ruslan Abishov | 22 | 2 | 17+0 | 1 | 1+0 | 0 | 4+0 | 1 |
| 81 | MF | (Brazil) BRA | Ricardo Vilana | 4 | 0 | 0+0 | 0 | 0+0 | 0 | 0+4 | 0 |
| 85 | GK | (Azerbaijan) AZE | Kamal Bayramov | 1 | 0 | 1+0 | 0 | 0+0 | 0 | 0+0 | 0 |
| 99 | FW | (Brazil) BRA | Beto | 5 | 0 | 2+3 | 0 | 0+0 | 0 | 0+0 | 0 |

=== Goal scorers ===
| Place | Position | Nation | Number | Name | Premier League | Azerbaijan Cup | Europa League | Total |
|---|---|---|---|---|---|---|---|---|
| 1 | FW | (Azerbaijan) | 9 | Branimir Subašić | 3 | 1 | 3 | 7 |
| 2 | FW | (Greece) | 11 | Dimitris Sialmas | 6 | 0 | 0 | 6 |
| 2 | DF | (Romania) | 27 | Adrian Scarlatache | 5 | 0 | 1 | 6 |
| 4 | MF | (Croatia) | 6 | Robert Alviž | 5 | 0 | 0 | 5 |
| 4 | MF | (Mali) | 7 | Sadio Tounkara | 5 | 0 | 0 | 5 |
| 4 | FW | (Azerbaijan) | 55 | Aghabala Ramazanov | 1 | 4 | 0 | 5 |
| 7 | MF | (Romania) | 16 | Adrian Piţ | 4 | 0 | 0 | 4 |
| 8 | DF | (Azerbaijan) | 14 | Rahid Amirguliyev | 1 | 2 | 0 | 3 |
| 9 | DF | (Azerbaijan) | 15 | Ruslan Abishov | 1 | 0 | 1 | 2 |
| 9 | MF | (Azerbaijan) | 10 | Elnur Abdullayev | 2 | 0 | 0 | 2 |
| 9 | MF | (Azerbaijan) | 17 | Kazim Kazimli | 2 | 0 | 0 | 2 |
| 9 | FW | (Turkey) | 24 | Gökhan Güleç | 2 | 0 | 0 | 2 |
| 9 | MF | (Azerbaijan) | 9 | Uğur Pamuk | 1 | 1 | 0 | 2 |
| 14 | DF | (Spain) | 6 | Álvaro Silva | 1 | 0 | 0 | 1 |
| 14 | FW | (Argentina) | 35 | Luciano Olguín | 0 | 1 | 0 | 1 |
| 14 | | | | Own goal | 1 | 0 | 0 | 1 |
| | | | | TOTALS | 40 | 9 | 5 | 54 |

=== Disciplinary record ===
| Number | Nation | Position | Name | Premier League | | Azerbaijan Cup | | Europa League | | Total | |
| Number | Nation | Position | Name | Yellow card | Red card | Yellow card | Red card | Yellow card | Red card | Yellow card | Red card |
| 2 | (Azerbaijan) | DF | Elnur Allahverdiyev | 4 | 1 | 1 | 0 | 2 | 0 | 6 | 1 |
| 3 | (Brazil) | DF | Vanderson | 3 | 1 | 2 | 0 | 0 | 0 | 4 | 1 |
| 4 | (Spain) | DF | Álvaro Silva | 5 | 0 | 2 | 0 | 0 | 0 | 6 | 0 |
| 5 | (Azerbaijan) | DF | Elnur Allahverdiyev | 1 | 1 | 1 | 0 | 0 | 0 | 2 | 1 |
| 6 | (Croatia) | DF | Robert Alviž | 9 | 0 | 3 | 0 | 2 | 0 | 14 | 0 |
| 7 | (Mali) | MF | Sadio Tounkara | 5 | 0 | 0 | 0 | 2 | 0 | 7 | 0 |
| 8 | (Brazil) | MF | Éder Bonfim | 4 | 0 | 0 | 0 | 1 | 0 | 5 | 0 |
| 9 | (Azerbaijan) | FW | Branimir Subašić | 3 | 0 | 0 | 0 | 1 | 0 | 4 | 0 |
| 10 | (Azerbaijan) | MF | Elnur Abdullayev | 4 | 1 | 1 | 1 | 0 | 0 | 5 | 2 |
| 11 | (Greece) | FW | Dimitris Sialmas | 2 | 1 | 1 | 0 | 0 | 0 | 3 | 1 |
| 14 | (Azerbaijan) | DF | Rahid Amirguliyev | 6 | 0 | 1 | 0 | 3 | 1 | 10 | 1 |
| 15 | (Azerbaijan) | DF | Ruslan Abishov | 2 | 2 | 0 | 0 | 1 | 0 | 3 | 2 |
| 16 | (Romania) | DF | Adrian Piţ | 5 | 0 | 0 | 0 | 1 | 0 | 6 | 0 |
| 21 | (Bulgaria) | DF | Radomir Todorov | 3 | 0 | 1 | 0 | 0 | 0 | 4 | 0 |
| 24 | (Turkey) | FW | Gökhan Güleç | 3 | 0 | 0 | 0 | 0 | 0 | 3 | 0 |
| 25 | (Azerbaijan) | GK | Orkhan Sadigli | 1 | 0 | 0 | 0 | 0 | 0 | 1 | 0 |
| 27 | (Romania) | DF | Adrian Scarlatache | 8 | 1 | 0 | 0 | 0 | 0 | 8 | 1 |
| 30 | (Costa Rica) | FW | Randall Brenes | 0 | 0 | 0 | 0 | 1 | 0 | 1 | 0 |
| 30 | (Spain) | GK | Toni Doblas | 1 | 0 | 0 | 0 | 0 | 0 | 1 | 0 |
| 35 | (Argentina) | FW | Luciano Olguín | 3 | 0 | 1 | 0 | 0 | 0 | 4 | 0 |
| 55 | (Azerbaijan) | FW | Aghabala Ramazanov | 4 | 0 | 0 | 0 | 0 | 0 | 4 | 0 |
| 85 | (Azerbaijan) | GK | Kamal Bayramov | 1 | 0 | 0 | 0 | 0 | 0 | 1 | 0 |
| 99 | (Brazil) | FW | Beto | 1 | 0 | 0 | 0 | 0 | 0 | 1 | 0 |
| 99 | (Croatia) | MF | Marin Oršulić | 2 | 0 | 2 | 0 | 0 | 0 | 4 | 0 |
| | | | TOTALS | 80 | 8 | 17 | 1 | 14 | 1 | 111 | 10 |

== Team kit ==
These are the 2012–13 Khazar Lankaran kits.

Supplier: Puma
Sponsor(s): Palmali

| Home | Away |
