= 2011–12 in Azerbaijani football =

2012 season

The 2011–12 season was the 20th season of competitive football in Azerbaijan.

The season began on 6 August 2011 for Premier League and 10 September for the First Division. The first round of the Premier League ended on 7 March 2012, with the Championship and Relegation groups having their first games on 11 March. The Championship group ended on 11 May 2013 and the Relegation group on 12 May 2013, the same day as the First Division ended.

== Season events ==
=== Inter Baku scandal ===
On 21 August 2011, Inter Baku - FK Baku game was suspended during last minutes due referee scandal, therefore game's fate decided after Professional Football League of Azerbaijan's decision. On 23 August 2011, PFL awarded 3-0 technical victory to FK Baku and announced the following punishments were given to Inter Baku's individuals:

- Georgi Nikolov, club's chairman: 5 game ban from football and fined 5,000 AZN.
- Kakhaber Tskhadadze: fined 1,000 AZN.
- Giorgi Lomaia: 2 game ban and fined 2,000 AZN.

Furthermore, Inter Baku fined additional 13,000 AZN for breaching security regulations.

=== Khazar Lankaran and Turan controversy ===
On 6 August 2011, the Disciplinary Committee of AFFA imposed the punishment on the scandal that took place in two matches. Khazar Lankaran fined 10,000 AZN after club's fans threw alien objects to the court, injuring the head of Inter Baku's coach Kakhaber Tskhadadze. Khazar also must play its next two league home matches in an empty stadium because of its fans' aggressive behavior.

AFFA fined Turan Tovuz 26,000 AZN and moved its next two league home matches on a neutral ground for injuring referees, breaking PFL camera as well as for refusing to play at the second half of 2011–12 Azerbaijan Cup. The club's president Musa Suleymanov has been disqualified for five matches and club received technical defeat of 0–3.

== National Football Team ==
=== Euro 2012 qualification ===
2 September 2011	Azerbaijan	1 – 1	Belgium	Baku, Azerbaijan
21:00 UTC+5	R. Aliyev 86'	Report	Simons 55' (pen.)	Stadium: Tofik Bakhramov Stadium; Attendance: 9,300; Referee: Lee Probert (England)

6 September 2011	Azerbaijan	3 – 2	Kazakhstan	Baku, Azerbaijan
20:00 UTC+5	R. Aliyev 53'; Shukurov 62' (pen.); Javadov 67'	Report	Ostapenko 20'; Yevstigneyev 77'	Stadium: Tofik Bakhramov Stadium; Attendance: 9,112; Referee: Anders Hermansen (Denmark)

7 October 2011	Azerbaijan	1 – 4	Austria	Baku, Azerbaijan
21:00 UTC+5	Nadirov 74'	Report	Ivanschitz 34'; Janko 52', 62'; Junuzović 90+1'	Stadium: Dalga Stadium; Attendance: 6,000; Referee: Stephan Studer (Switzerland)

11 October 2011	Turkey	1 – 0	Azerbaijan	Istanbul, Turkey
21:00 UTC+5	Burak 60'	Report		Stadium: Turk Telekom Arena; Attendance: 32,174; Referee: Peter Rasmussen (Denmark)

=== Friendlies ===
10 August 2011 Friendly	Azerbaijan	0 – 1	(North Macedonia) Macedonia	(Azerbaijan) , Baku
		[ (Report)]

11 November 2011 Friendly	Albania	0 – 1	Azerbaijan	(Albania) Qemal Stafa, Tirana
		Summary	Aliyev 22'	Attendance: 1,200; Referee: (Italy) Paolo Mazzoleni

29 February 2012 Friendly	Azerbaijan	2 - 2	Singapore	(United Arab Emirates) The Sevens, Dubai
	Aliyev 15'; Şükürov 62'	[ Report] Summary	Ishak 72' (pen.); Mustafić 90+3'

27 February 2012 Friendly	Azerbaijan	3 - 0	India	(United Arab Emirates) The Sevens, Dubai
	Şükürov 4', 42' (pen.); Hajiyev 84'	[ Report] Summary

29 February 2012 Friendly	Palestine	2 - 0	Azerbaijan	(United Arab Emirates) The Sevens, Dubai
	Nu'man 39'; Abuhabib 79'	[ Report] Summary

=== Goal scorers ===
Place	Position	Name	Friendlies	WC Qualifying	Total
1	FW	Rauf Aliyev	2	2	4
1	DF	Mahir Şükürov	3	1	4
3	FW	Vagif Javadov	0	1	1
3	FW	Vüqar Nadirov	0	1	1
3	MF	Nizami Hajiyev	1	0	1
		TOTALS	6	5	11

== League tables ==
=== Azerbaijan Premier League ===
Pos	Team	Pld	W	D	L	GF	GA	GD	Pts	Qualification
1	Neftçi Baku	22	16	1	5	45	17	+28	49	Qualification for championship group
2	Inter Baku	22	13	6	3	21	10	+11	45	Qualification for championship group
3	Khazar Lankaran	22	13	5	4	33	19	+14	44	Qualification for championship group
4	Qarabağ	22	12	5	5	27	14	+13	41	Qualification for championship group
5	Baku	22	10	5	7	27	22	+5	35	Qualification for championship group
6	Gabala	22	10	5	7	27	23	+4	35	Qualification for championship group
7	AZAL	22	8	5	9	35	35	0	29	Qualification for relegation group
8	Ravan Baku	22	6	7	9	23	29	−6	25	Qualification for relegation group
9	Kapaz	22	6	4	12	26	38	−12	22	Qualification for relegation group
10	Simurq	22	5	4	13	18	34	−16	19	Qualification for relegation group
11	Sumgayit	22	4	3	15	16	37	−21	15	Qualification for relegation group
12	Turan	22	3	2	17	13	33	−20	11	Qualification for relegation group

Source: Soccerway: Azerbaijan Premier League Table
Rules for classification: 1) points; 2) goal difference; 3) number of goals scored.

==== Championship group ====
Pos	Team	Pld	W	D	L	GF	GA	GD	Pts	Qualification or relegation
1	Neftçi Baku (C)	32	20	3	9	55	30	+25	63	Qualification for Champions League second qualifying round
2	Khazar Lankaran	32	17	8	7	44	28	+16	59	Qualification for Europa League first qualifying round (Note: Baku qualified for the first qualifiying round of the 2012–13 UEFA Europa League as winner of the 2011–12 Azerbaijan Cup.)
3	Inter Baku	32	16	8	8	29	21	+8	56	Qualification for Europa League first qualifying round
4	Qarabağ	32	15	8	9	37	28	+9	53	
5	Gabala	32	15	7	10	43	32	+11	52	
6	Baku	32	15	5	12	42	37	+5	50	Qualification for Europa League first qualifying round

Source: Soccerway.com
Rules for classification: 1) points; 2) goal difference; 3) number of goals scored.
(C) Champions

==== Relegation group ====
Pos	Team	Pld	W	D	L	GF	GA	GD	Pts	Qualification or relegation
7	AZAL	32	12	8	12	44	44	0	44	
8	Ravan Baku	32	10	11	11	39	39	0	41	
9	Simurq	32	8	10	14	27	41	−14	34	
10	Kapaz	32	9	5	18	35	55	−20	32	
11	Turan (R)	32	6	7	19	26	42	−16	25	Qualification for relegation playoffs
12	Sumgayit (R)	32	6	6	20	27	52	−25	24	Relegation to Azerbaijan First Division

Source: Soccerway.com
Rules for classification: 1) points; 2) goal difference; 3) number of goals scored.
(R) Relegated

=== Azerbaijan First Division ===
Pos	Team	Pld	W	D	L	GF	GA	GD	Pts
1	Qaradağ (C)	26	21	2	3	45	9	+36	65
2	Karvan	26	17	4	5	55	22	+33	55
3	Neftchala	26	16	7	3	42	16	+26	55
4	Şahdağ	26	13	6	7	46	33	+13	45
5	Bakili	26	11	5	10	36	28	+8	38
6	Lokomotiv-Bilajary	26	10	6	10	37	33	+4	36
7	FK MKT-Araz	26	11	3	12	35	43	−8	36
8	Şəmkir	26	9	6	11	38	38	0	33
9	Tərəqqi	26	9	4	13	28	30	−2	31
10	Mughan	26	9	4	13	26	43	−17	31
11	Şuşa	26	7	8	11	21	23	−2	29
12	Energetik	26	6	7	13	21	45	−24	25
13	MOIK Baku	26	7	4	15	34	44	−10	25
14	Göyəzən	26	1	4	21	17	74	−57	7

Source: Soccerway
Rules for classification: 1) points; 2) goal difference; 3) number of goals scored.
(C) Champions

== Azerbaijan Cup ==
17 May 2012
20:00 AZST

Baku	2−0	Neftchi Baku
Koke 8'; Juninho 27'	Summary	Denis Silva (yellow card) 60' (yellow-red card) 82'

Dalga Arena
Attendance: 4,300

== Managerial changes ==
Team	Outgoing manager	Manner of departure	Date of vacancy	Position in table	Replaced by	Date of appointment
AZAL	(Azerbaijan) Nazim Suleymanov	Resigned	7 July 2011	Pre-season	(Azerbaijan) Elkhan Abdullayev	12 July 2011
Neftchi	(Azerbaijan) Arif Asadov	Resigned	29 July 2011	Pre-season	(Azerbaijan) Boyukagha Hajiyev	2 August 2011
Ravan Baku	(Azerbaijan) Bahman Hasanov	Resigned	20 September 2011	11th	(Azerbaijan) Vladislav Kadyrov	20 September 2011
AZAL	(Azerbaijan) Elkhan Abdullayev	Resigned	31 October 2011	10th	(Azerbaijan) Rafig Mirzayev	1 November 2011
Gabala	(England) Tony Adams	Resigned	16 November 2011	6th	(Turkey) Fatih Kavlak	16 November 2011
Kapaz	(Azerbaijan) Mehman Allahverdiyev	Resigned	21 November 2011	10th	(Azerbaijan) Mirbaghir Isayev	21 November 2011
Khazar Lankaran	(Romania) Mircea Rednic	Sacked	4 December 2011	3rd	(Turkey) Cüneyt Biçer	5 December 2011
Kapaz	(Azerbaijan) Mirbaghir Isayev	Resigned	24 December 2011	10th	(Azerbaijan) Fuad Ismayilov	1 January 2012
Ravan Baku	(Azerbaijan) Vladislav Kadyrov	Sacked	5 February 2012	8th	(Azerbaijan) Bahman Hasanov	6 February 2012
Simurq	(Russia) Sergey Yuran	Mutually terminated	5 March 2012	10th	(Azerbaijan) Igor Getman	5 March 2012
Simurq	(Azerbaijan) Igor Getman	End of tenure as caretaker	11 March 2012	10th	(Georgia (country)) Giorgi Chikhradze	11 March 2012
FC Baku	(Latvia) Aleksandrs Starkovs	Mutually terminated	11 March 2012	5th	(Azerbaijan) Novruz Azimov	11 March 2012
Khazar Lankaran	(Turkey) Cüneyt Biçer	Sacked	15 March 2012	4th	(Azerbaijan) Yunis Hüseynov	15 March 2012
AZAL	(Azerbaijan) Rafig Mirzayev	Mutually terminated	2 April 2012	7th	(Azerbaijan) Mais Azimov	2 April 2012
AZAL	(Azerbaijan) Mais Azimov	End of tenure as caretaker	6 April 2012	7th	(Azerbaijan) Vagif Sadygov	6 April 2012
