= 2012–13 Azerbaijan First Division =

Azerbaijan First Division
- Season: 2012–13
- Champions: Ağsu
- Matches: 156
- Goals: 460 (2.95 per match)

The 2012–13 Azerbaijan First Division is the second-level of football in Azerbaijan. There were thirteen teams participating in Azerbaijani First Division this season.

== Teams ==
In April 2013, Tərəqqi owners announced that club will be dissolved and all of their results in Azerbaijan First Division will be annulled.

Location of teams in 2011-12 Azerbaijan First Division

Team	Location	Stadium	Stadium capacity
Ağsu	Agsu	Agsu City Stadium	3,000
Bakılı	Baku	Zirə Olympic Sport Complex Stadium	1,500
Energetik	Mingachevir	Yashar Mammadzade Stadium	5,000
Göyəzən	Qazakh	Qazakh City Stadium	15,000
Lokomotiv	Baku	FC Baku stadium	3,000
Qala	Baku	Zirə Olympic Sport Complex Stadium	1,500
MOIK	Baku	MOIK Stadium	3,000
Neftçala	Neftchala	Nariman Narimanov Stadium	2,000
Qaradağ	Lökbatan	Lökbatan Olympic Sport Complex Stadium	2,000
Şahdağ	Qusar	Şövkət Orduxanov Stadium	4,000
Şəmkir	Şəmkir	Shamkir Olympic Sport Complex Stadium	2,000
Şuşa	Baku	Shafa Stadium	8,000
Tərəqqi	Ganja	Ganja City Stadium	25,000

== League table ==
Pos	Team	Pld	W	D	L	GF	GA	GD	Pts
1	Ağsu (C)	24	20	3	1	65	18	+47	63
2	Qaradağ	24	20	3	1	61	8	+53	63
3	Neftchala	24	17	3	4	51	18	+33	54
4	Şahdağ	24	12	6	6	40	30	+10	42
5	MOIK Baku	24	11	6	7	39	28	+11	39
6	Tərəqqi	24	12	1	11	24	24	0	37
7	Bakili	24	7	7	10	30	38	−8	28
8	Lokomotiv-Bilajary	24	7	3	14	28	38	−10	24
9	Şuşa	24	7	2	15	29	40	−11	23
10	Energetik	24	5	4	15	26	52	−26	19
11	Qala	24	5	3	16	21	49	−28	18
12	Göyəzən	24	4	5	15	23	61	−38	17
13	Şəmkir	24	3	6	15	23	56	−33	15

Source: Soccerway
Rules for classification: 1) points; 2) goal difference; 3) number of goals scored.
(C) Champions

=== Results ===
Home \ Away	SSQ	AGU	GYZ	BKL	ENG	LBA	MOI	QAL	NEF	QAR	SHA	SHU	TAR
Şahdağ		2–3	2–1	2–3	2–0	3–1	3–1	4–0	0–0	1–4	1–0	2–0	2–0
Ağsu	4–1		6–1	2–1	5–0	3–0	0–0	2–0	4–0	2–1	5–0	3–1	5–0
Göyəzən	2–2	0–2		1–1	3–1	3–1	1–4	2–1	0–4	0–1	1–4	2–1	0–0
Bakili	2–1	2–3	2–0		2–2	0–0	1–1	1–3	1–2	1–3	1–1	0–1	3–0
Energetik	1–2	0–2	4–2	0–0		2–0	2–1	2–0	0–5	1–7	3–1	1–3	1–2
Lokomotiv-Bilajary	1–1	2–3	4–1	3–0	0–0		2–3	0–2	0–1	0–2	4–1	4–1	1–0
MOIK Baku	0–2	2–3	3–0	6–0	2–1	1–0		1–0	1–3	0–0	2–1	3–1	0–1
Qala	2–2	0–0	3–0	0–3	3–2	0–2	4–3		1–2	0–4	1–3	0–2	0–4
ANSAD-Petrol Neftçala	1–2	3–1	6–0	1–1	1–0	2–0	1–1	2–0		0–1	6–1	2–1	1–0
Qaradağ	2–0	0–0	4–0	3–0	5–1	3–0	0–0	2–0	2–0		6–0	3–0	1–0
Şəmkir	1–1	2–4	0–0	2–3	2–2	2–1	1–1	0–0	1–5	0–1		0–2	0–2
Şuşa	1–1	0–2	2–2	0–2	1–0	1–2	1–2	5–1	0–1	1–3	3–0		0–2
Tərəqqi	0–1	0–1	3–1	1–0	1–0	3–0	0–1	1–0	0–2	1–3	1–0	2–1	

Source: Soccerway: Azerbaijan First Division Table
Legend: Blue = home team win; Yellow = draw; Red = away team win.

== Season statistics ==
=== Top scorers ===
Rank	Player	Club	Goals
1	(Azerbaijan) Nicat Tagiyev	Ağsu	19
2	(Azerbaijan) Novruz Alekperov	Qaradağ	17
3	(Azerbaijan) Agshin Hasimov	Neftchala	14
4	(Azerbaijan) Ravi Rahmanov	Ağsu	13
5	(Azerbaijan) Bakhtiyar Fəzai	Qala	11
6	(Azerbaijan) Real Mamedov	Energetik	10
7	(Azerbaijan) Yusif Yusifzade	Şahdağ	9
7	(Azerbaijan) Zahid Tayıbov	Şahdağ	9
7	(Azerbaijan) Orxan Babayev	Tərəqqi/Bakili	9
10	(Azerbaijan) Babak Huseynov	Göyəzən	8
10	(Azerbaijan) Samir Abdulov	Neftchala	8
10	(Azerbaijan) Elvin Adısirinli	Şuşa	8

=== Hat-tricks ===
Player	For	Against	Result	Date
(Azerbaijan) Samir Abdulov	Neftchala	Şəmkir	5–1	9 September 2012
(Azerbaijan) Nicat Tagiyev	Ağsu	Göyəzən	6–1	6 October 2012
(Azerbaijan) Bakhtiyar Fəzai	Qala	Göyəzən	3–0	9 November 2012
(Azerbaijan) Ibrahim Huseynov	Tərəqqi	Göyəzən	3–1	25 November 2012
(Azerbaijan) Zahid Tayıbov	Şahdağ	Qala	4–0	16 March 2013
(Azerbaijan) Novruz Alekperov^{4}	Qaradağ	Energetik	5–1	17 March 2013
(Azerbaijan) Muhammad Khalilov	Şuşa	Qala	5–1	30 March 2013
(Azerbaijan) Real Mamedov	Energetik	Göyəzən	4–2	6 April 2013
(Azerbaijan) Rahman Musayev	MOIK Baku	Göyəzən	3–0	6 May 2013
(Azerbaijan) Aslan Huseynov	Neftchala	Şəmkir	6–1	18 May 2013

- ^{4} Player scored 4 goals
