= Böyük Oyun =

Azerbaijani football rivalry

Böyük Oyun The Great Game
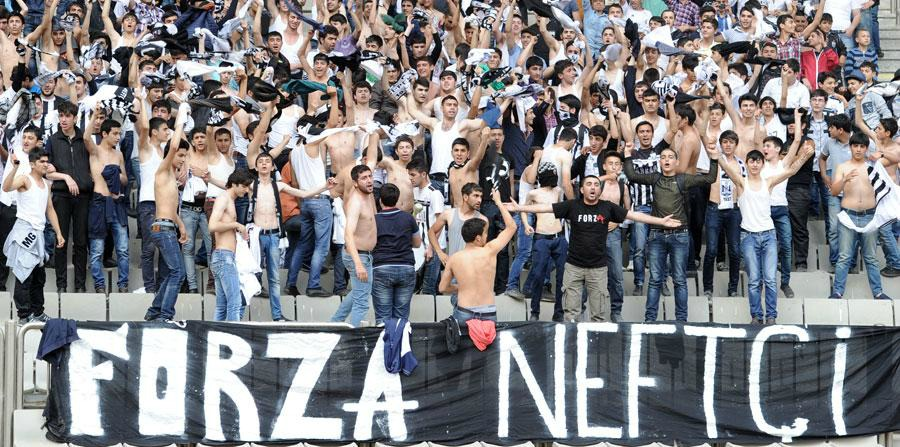
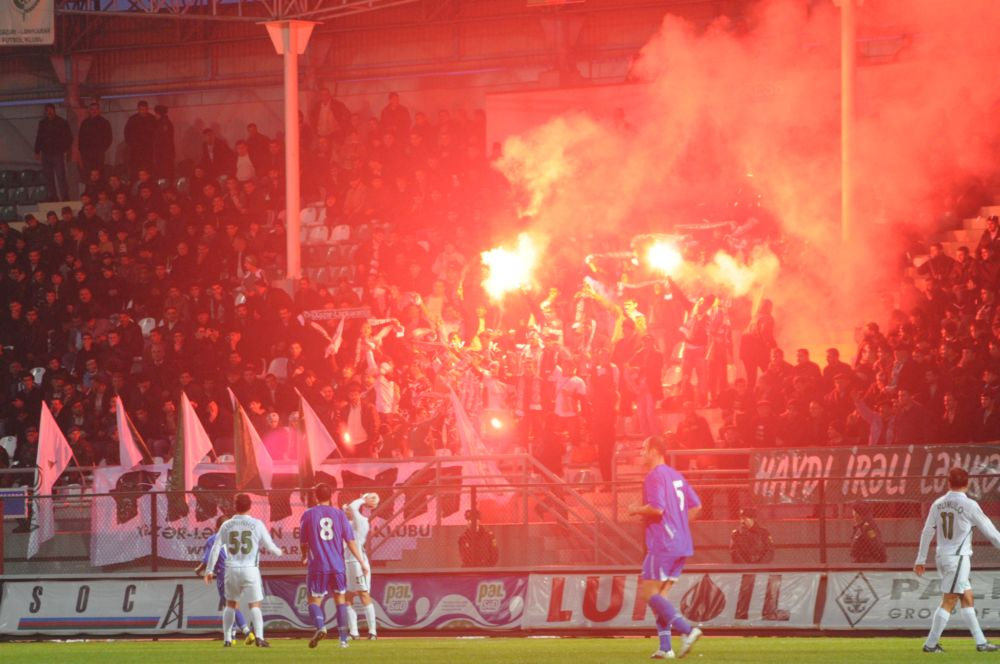
- Neftçi and Khazar fans
- Other names: Neftchi Baku vs Khazar Lankaran
- Location: Baku / Lankaran, Azerbaijan
- Teams: Neftchi Baku; Khazar Lankaran
- First meeting: 8 December 2004
- Latest meeting: Khazar Lankaran 0-1 Neftchi (10 April 2016)

Statistics
- Total meetings: 43
- Most wins: Neftchi Baku (16)
- Top scorer: Flavinho (7)
- All-time series: Neftçi: 16; Drawn: 17; Khazar Lankaran: 10

Böyük Oyun (The Great Game in English) is an Azerbaijani football rivalry between Neftçi Baku and Khazar Lankaran. The fixture had developed into an intense and often bitter one, traditionally attracting large attendances. The tie was played out at numerous venues across the cities, with Khazar Lankaran Central Stadium being the stadium most synonymous with the fixture, having hosted more games than any other.

== History ==
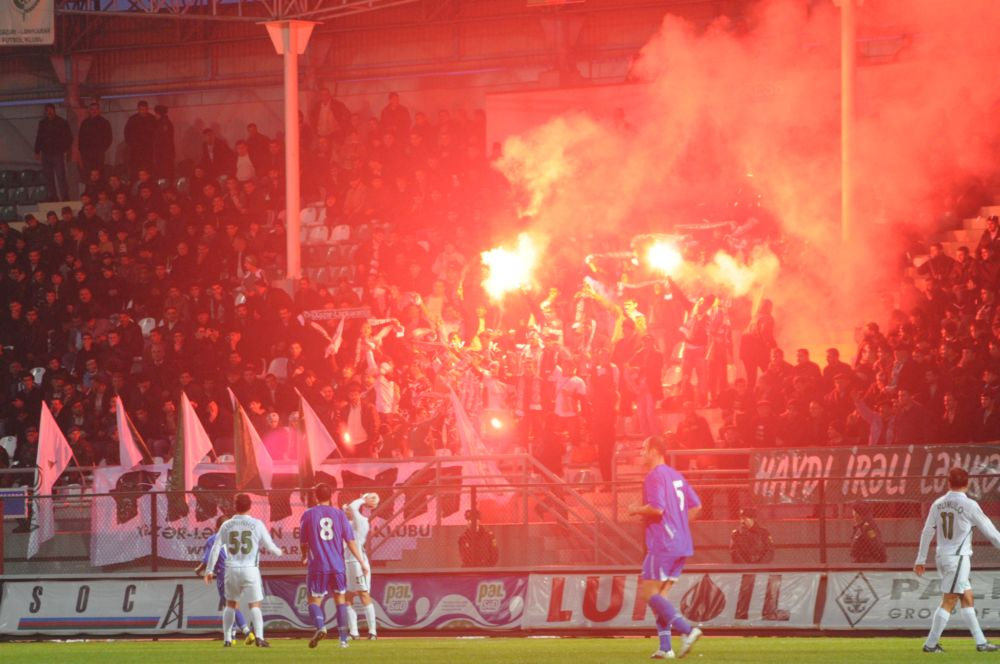
Khazar Lankaran fans.

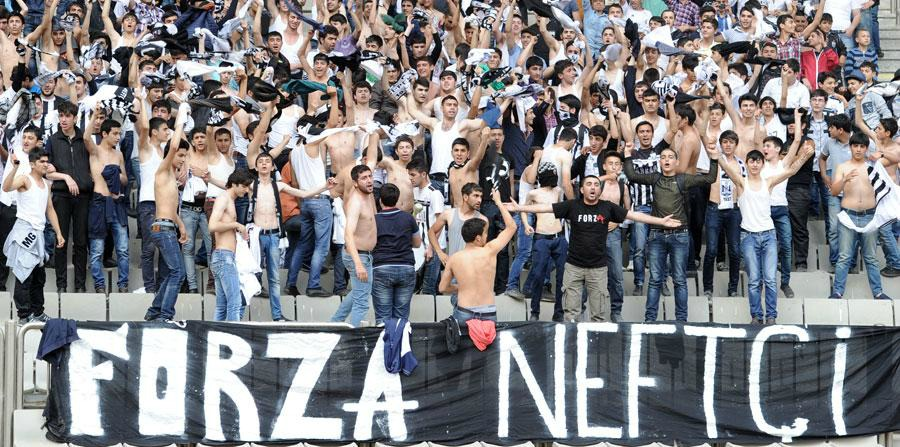
Neftçi fans.

=== Cultural rivalry ===
Locations of the two teams

The clubs have large support bases in Baku, as well as supporters’ groups in most towns across Azerbaijan. The relationship between the two teams has long been marked by strong animosity, as the rivalry represents two geographic regions: Neftchi symbolizes the north of Azerbaijan, while Khazar Lankaran represents the south.

=== Football rivalry ===
The first game played between the two sides was an Azerbaijan Premier League fixture on Wednesday, 8 December 2004. The game, staged at Lankaran City stadium, finished 1–1 draw. Both clubs compete each other for the title of the most successful football club in the country.

==== The Great Game Marathon ====
In 2011, the derby reached its ultimate peak as both clubs had to play each other 4 times during 33 days, after Azerbaijan Cup draws and Azerbaijan Premier League format changes. Khazar once became triumphant over Neftchi, even though all other remaining games ended in draw.

==== Unbeaten series of Khazar Lankaran ====
Khazar Lankaran has the longest unbeaten series in Great Games. Last time Lankaran side lost to Neftchi on 12 April 2009 (2:1). After that date 11 games have been played between both teams in all competitions. In three of last eleven encounters Khazar Lankaran beat their rival and other matches finished with draw.

On 6 November 2011, Neftchi broke Khazar's 938 days of unbeaten run and recorded the biggest win in derby, by beating Khazar 5–0 in Baku.

==== Current issues ====
The rivalry intensified in 2013 due to the final of the Azerbaijan Cup. Several accusations of unsportsmanlike behaviour from both teams and a war of words erupted throughout the fixtures which included post-match fight between fans and players.

=== Supporters rivalry ===
The rivalry turned bitter after Neftchi won Azerbaijan Premier League title by beating Khazar Lankaran in play off match. Over time, the rivalry became more heated and club fans began attaining collective identities. Neftchi was seen as a capital club, while Khazar was viewed as regional club and supported by the south regions of Azerbaijani society.

Crowd attendances for first 21 games, has exceeded 229,000 supporters.

== All-time results ==
League

| | | Khazar Lankaran vs Neftchi Baku | | | | Neftchi Baku vs Khazar Lankaran | | | |
| Season | Division | Date | Venue | Score | Attendance | Date | Venue | Score | Attendance |
|---|---|---|---|---|---|---|---|---|---|
| 2004-05 | Top League | 08.12.2004 | Lankaran City Stadium | 1 – 1 | | 11.05.2005 | Tofik Bakhramov Stadium | 2 – 1 | |
| 2004-05 | Championship Play-off | To determine League winner (Played at neutral venue): | | | | 10.06.2005 | Ganja City Stadium | 2 – 1 | 25,000 |
| 2005-06 | Top League | 18.12.2005 | Lankaran City Stadium | 0 – 1 | | 30.05.2006 | Tofik Bakhramov Stadium | 2 – 2 | |
| 2006-07 | Top League | 11.08.2006 | Lankaran City Stadium | 2 – 1 | | 16.02.2007 | Tofik Bakhramov Stadium | 1 – 0 | |
| 2007-08 | Premier League | 10.11.2007 | Lankaran City Stadium | 0 – 1 | | 11.05.2008 | Tofik Bakhramov Stadium | 0 – 1 | |
| 2008-09 | Premier League | 19.10.2008 | Lankaran City Stadium | 2 – 0 | | 12.04.2009 | Tofik Bakhramov Stadium | 2 – 1 | |
| 2009-10 | Premier League | 08.11.2009 | Lankaran City Stadium | 0 – 0 | 12,000 | 17.02.2010 | Tofik Bakhramov Stadium | 0 – 0 | 3,000 |
| 2009-10 | Championship Group | 27.03.2010 | Lankaran City Stadium | 0 – 0 | 14,000 | 01.05.2010 | Tofik Bakhramov Stadium | 0 – 0 | 4,000 |
| 2010-11 | Premier League | 25.09.2010 | Lankaran City Stadium | 1 – 0 | 11,000 | 13.02.2011 | Tofik Bakhramov Stadium | 0 – 0 | 2,500 |
| 2010-11 | Championship Group | 18.03.2011 | Lankaran City Stadium | 1 – 1 | 15,000 | 18.05.2011 | Tofik Bakhramov Stadium | 1 – 1 | 7,500 |
| 2011-12 | Premier League | 10.09.2011 | Lankaran City Stadium | 1 – 0 | 14,000 | 06.11.2011 | Ismat Gayibov Stadium | 5 – 0 | 2,500 |
| 2011-12 | Championship Group | 22.04.2012 | Lankaran City Stadium | 1 – 0 | 1,200 | 24.03.2012 | Ismat Gayibov Stadium | 1 – 1 | 4,500 |
| 2012-13 | Premier League | 14.12.2012 | Lankaran City Stadium | 2 – 1 | 9,500 | 15.09.2012 | Ismat Gayibov Stadium | 2 – 1 | 4,500 |
| 2013-14 | Premier League | 25.08.2013 | Lankaran City Stadium | 0 – 0 | 10,000 | 02.11.2013 | Bakcell Arena | 4 – 1 | 2,000 |
| 2013-14 | Premier League | 09.02.2014 | Lankaran City Stadium | 2 – 2 | 11,000 | 29.03.2014 | Bakcell Arena | 1 – 0 | 4,000 |
| 2014-15 | Premier League | 24.11.2014 | Dalga Arena | 2 – 2 | 1,200 | 13.09.2014 | Ismat Gayibov Stadium | 1 – 0 | 2,000 |
| 2014-15 | Premier League | 09.04.2015 | Lankaran City Stadium | 2 – 2 | 4,500 | 11.02.2015 | Bakcell Arena | 2 – 0 | 2,000 |
| 2015-16 | Premier League | 22.11.2015 | Lankaran City Stadium | 0 – 2 | 9,000 | 20.09.2015 | Bakcell Arena | 1 – 1 | 1,500 |
| 2015-16 | Premier League | 10.04.2016 | Lankaran City Stadium | 0 – 1 | 3,500 | 13.02.2016 | Bakcell Arena | 1 – 0 | 2,500 |

Cup

| Season | Competition | Round | Date | Stadium | Home team | Score | Away team | Attendance | Notes |
|---|---|---|---|---|---|---|---|---|---|
| 2010–11 | Cup | Quarter Final Leg 1 | 03.03.2011 | Tofik Bakhramov Stadium | Neftchi Baku | 3 – 4 | Khazar Lankaran | 5,000 | Khazar progressed 5 – 4 on aggregate |
| 2010–11 | Cup | Quarter Final Leg 2 | 08.03.2011 | Lankaran City Stadium | Khazar Lankaran | 1 – 1 | Neftchi Baku | 15,000 | Khazar progressed 5 – 4 on aggregate |
| 2012–13 | Cup | Final | 28.05.2013 | Tofik Bakhramov Stadium | Neftchi Baku | 0 – 0 | Khazar Lankaran | 20,000 | Neftchi won 5 – 3 on penalties |
| 2013–14 | SuperCup | Supercup | 23.10.2013 | Nakhchivan City Stadium | Neftchi Baku | 1 – 2 | Khazar Lankaran | 9,800 | |
| 2015–16 | Cup | Quarter Final Leg 1 | 02.03.2016 | Lankaran City Stadium | Khazar Lankaran | 3 – 2 | Neftchi Baku | 4,500 | Neftchi progressed 4 – 3 on aggregate |
| 2015–16 | Cup | Quarter Final Leg 2 | 09.03.2016 | Bakcell Arena | Neftchi Baku | 2 – 0 | Khazar Lankaran | 2,500 | Neftchi progressed 4 – 3 on aggregate |

== Statistics ==
=== Head to head record ===
| Competition | Played | Neftchi Baku | Draw | Khazar Lankaran |
|---|---|---|---|---|
| Azerbaijan Premier League | 37 | 15 | 15 | 7 |
| Azerbaijan Cup | 5 | 1 | 2 | 2 |
| Azerbaijan Supercup | 1 | 0 | 0 | 1 |
| Totals | 43 | 16 | 17 | 10 |

Note: League championship statistics includes play-off match for the 2004–05 title, which Neftchi won 2–1.

Statistics obtained from Apasport

=== Highest attendance ===
Attendance Records
| Rank | Attendance | Date | Game | Stadium |
|---|---|---|---|---|
| 1 | 26,120 | 10 June 2005 | Neftchi Baku – Khazar Lankaran | Ganja City Stadium |
| 2 | 20,000 | 28 May 2013 | Neftchi Baku – Khazar Lankaran | Tofiq Bahramov Stadium |

=== Highest goalscorers ===
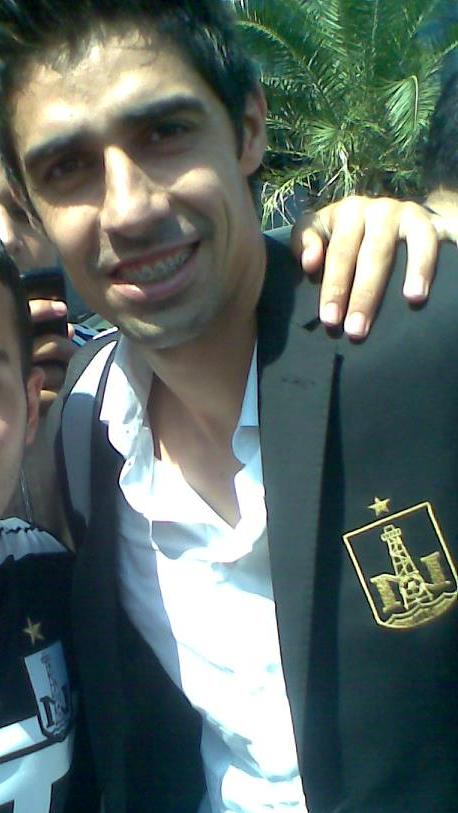
Flavinho is the highest goalscorer of the derby.

Top Ten Highest Goalscorers
| Player | | Period | Club | Goals |
|---|---|---|---|---|
| 1 | (Brazil) Flavinho | 2010 – present | Neftchi | 7 |
| 2 | (Azerbaijan) Zaur Tagizade | 2004–10 | Neftchi | 4 |
| 2 | (Sierra Leone) Julius Wobay | 2011 | Khazar | 4 |
| 3 | (Uzbekistan) Bahodir Nasimov | 2010 – 2014 | Neftchi | 3 |
| 4 | (Costa Rica) Winston Parks | 2010–11 | Khazar | 2 |
| 4 | (Azerbaijan) Rashad Abdullayev | 2004–09 | Khazar | 2 |
| 4 | (Azerbaijan) Zaur Ramazanov | 2005–08 | Khazar | 2 |
| 4 | (Chile) Nicolás Canales | 2012–13 | Neftchi | 2 |
| 4 | (Bulgaria) Svetoslav Petrov | 2006–09 | Neftchi | 2 |

=== Switching sides ===
(In bold: Transfer between both clubs)

==== Players ====
Transfers between both clubs are rare, only few in last decade.

| Player | Khazar Lankaran career | | | Neftçi career | | |
| Player | Span | League apps | League goals | Span | League apps | League goals |
|---|---|---|---|---|---|---|
| (Azerbaijan) Rashad Abdullayev | 2004–2009 | 116 | 12 | 2009–2012 | 86 | 16 |
| (Azerbaijan) Ruslan Abışov | 2012–2013 | 17 | 1 | 2006–2012; 2017–2019 | 116; 39 | 8; 6 |
| (Azerbaijan) Emin Quliyev | 2005–2009 | 70 | 10 | 2002; 2004–2005 | 16; 33 | 2; 5 |
| (Azerbaijan) Mahmud Qurbanov | 2005–2007 | 49 | 3 | 1996–1997; 2004–2005 | 23; 36 | 3; 3 |
| (Azerbaijan) Branimir Subašić | 2011–2013 | 43 | 9 | 2005–2008 | 65 | 31 |
| (Sierra Leone) Julius Wobay | 2011 | 19 | 5 | 2012–2015 | 58 | 15 |

==== Managers ====
- (Azerbaijan) Agaselim Mirjavadov (Neftchi 1987–88; 2004–06, Khazar 2006–10)

== See also ==
- Neftchi Baku
- Khazar Lankaran
- Major football rivalries
