= 2012–13 Azerbaijan Cup =

Tournament details
- Country: Azerbaijan
- Teams: 21

Final positions
- Champions: Neftchi Baku
- Runners-up: Khazar Lankaran

Tournament statistics
- Matches played: 26
- Goals scored: 67 (2.58 per match)
- Top goal scorer: Aghabala Ramazanov (4)

The Azerbaijan Cup 2012–13 is the 21st season of the annual cup competition in Azerbaijan. It started on 23 October 2012 with ten games of the first round and ended on 28 May 2013 with the final. FC Baku were the defending champions, with twenty-one teams competing in this year's competition.

The winner of the competition will qualify for the first qualifying round of the 2013–14 UEFA Europa League.

== First round ==
The games were played on the 22 and 24 October 2012.

22 October 2012	Qala	2 – 4	Kapaz	Baku
17:00 AZST (UTC+5)	B.Fazai 81', 85'	Report	Fomenko 2', 13', 59'; Soltanov 45'	Stadium: Zirə Olympic Sport Complex Stadium; Attendance: 150; Referee: Vusal Aliyev

24 October 2012	Taraggi	3 – 1	Ağsu	Ganja
15:00 AZST (UTC+5)	O.Babayev 39', 50'; A.Safarli 88'	Report	N.Tagiyev 87'	Stadium: Ganja City Stadium; Attendance: 100; Referee: Anar Niyazov

24 October 2012	Qaradağ	7 – 0	Lokomotiv-Bilajary	Lökbatan
15:00 AZST (UTC+5)	N.Alakbarov 14', 62', 68'; M.Mehdiyev 56'; R.Mammadov 73'; Yusubov 76', 78'	Report		Stadium: Lökbatan Olympic Sport Complex Stadium; Attendance: 100; Referee: Elvin Äsgärov

24 October 2012	MOIK Baku	0 – 0 (a.e.t.) (3 – 1 p)	Bakılı	Baku
15:00 AZST (UTC+5)		Report		Stadium: Shafa Stadium (IV field); Attendance: 30; Referee: Orkhan Mämmädov

24 October 2012	Şuşa	0 – 1	Neftçala	Baku
15:00 AZST (UTC+5)		Report	E.Abbasov 59'	Stadium: Shafa Stadium (IV field); Attendance: 200; Referee: Fariz Yusifov

== Second round ==
The five winners from the preliminary round joined the remaining eleven teams of the Azerbaijan Premier League in this round, all games were played on 28 November 2012.

Team 1	Score	Team 2
AZAL	0−1	Simurq
Taraggi	0−5	Neftchi
Gabala	2−0	Qaradağ
Kapaz	0–2 (a.e.t.)	Qarabağ
Baku	3−1	Sumgayit
MOIK Baku	0−3	Inter Baku
Ravan Baku	2−1	Neftçala
Turan	1–1 (a.e.t.) (4–5p)	Khazar

== Quarterfinals ==
The eight winners from the second round were drawn into four two-legged ties. The first legs were played on 27 February 2013 and the second legs on 7 March 2013.

27 February 2013 First Leg	Simurq	0 – 0	Neftchi Baku	Zaqatala
17:00 AZT (UTC+4)		Summary	Imamverdiyev (red card) 90+3'	Stadium: Zaqatala City Stadium; Attendance: 2,600; Referee: Fariz Yusifov

7 March 2013 Second Leg	Neftchi Baku	1 – 0 (a.e.t.) (1 – 0 agg.)	Simurq	Baku
17:00 AZT (UTC+4)	Flavinho 120'	Summary	Božić (yellow card) 64' (yellow-red card) 72'	Stadium: Bakcell Arena; Attendance: 1,000; Referee: Aliyar Ağayev

27 February 2013 First Leg	Gabala	1 – 1	Qarabağ	Qabala
15:00 AZT (UTC+4)	Dodô 33'	Summary	Nadirov 56'	Stadium: Gabala City Stadium; Attendance: 1,150; Referee: Aliyar Ağayev

7 March 2013 Second Leg	Qarabağ	0 – 0 (a 1 – 1 agg.)	Gabala	Quzanlı
18:00 AZT (UTC+4)		Summary		Stadium: Guzanli Olympic Complex Stadium; Attendance: 700; Referee: Fariz Yusifov

27 February 2013 First Leg	Baku	1 – 1	Inter Baku	Baku
15:00 AZT (UTC+4)	Nabiyev 90+2'	Summary	Kandelaki 80'	Stadium: Tofig Bakhramov Stadium; Attendance: 1,000; Referee: Rahim Häsänov

7 March 2013 Second Leg	Inter Baku	2 – 2 (3 – 3 (a) agg.)	Baku	Baku
16:00 AZT (UTC+4)	Tskhadadze 42', 60'	Summary	Šolić 32'; Aliyev 68'	Stadium: Shafa Stadium; Attendance: 1,500; Referee: Anar Salmanov

27 February 2013 Quarterfinals 1st leg	Ravan Baku	1 – 2	Khazar Lankaran	Baku
17:00 AZT (UTC+4)	Zečević 6'	Summary	Amirguliyev 74'; Pamuk 80'	Stadium: Dalga Arena; Attendance: 1,200; Referee: Rauf Jabbarov

7 March 2013 Quarterfinals 2nd leg	Khazar Lankaran	4 – 1 (6 – 2 agg.)	Ravan Baku	Lankaran
17:00 AZT (UTC+4)	Ramazanov 8', 81' (pen.), 90+2'; Olguín 28'	Summary	Adamović 69'	Stadium: Lankaran City Stadium; Attendance: 5,000; Referee: Orkhan Mammadov

== Semifinals ==
The four quarterfinal winners were drawn into two two-legged semifinal ties. The first legs were played on 17 April 2013, and the second legs on 24 April.

17 April 2013 First Leg	Baku	1 – 0	Khazar	Baku
16:00 AZST (UTC+5)	Pena 82' (pen.)			Stadium: Tofiq Bahramov Stadium; Attendance: 1,600; Referee: Vüsal Äliyev

24 April 2013 Second Leg	Khazar	2 – 0 (2 – 1 agg.)	Baku	Lankaran
19:00 AZST (UTC+5)	Ramazanov 45+1'; Amirguliyev 82'			Stadium: Lankaran City Stadium; Attendance: 10,000; Referee: Elchin Mammadov

17 April 2013 First Leg	Neftchi Baku	2 – 1	Qarabağ	Baku
19:30 AZST (UTC+5)	A. Abdullayev 62' (pen.); Nasimov 90'		Nadirov 55'	Stadium: Backell Arena; Attendance: 1000; Referee: Anar Salmanov

24 April 2013 Second Leg	Qarabağ	2 – 2 (3 – 4 agg.)	Neftchi Baku	Baku
21:00 AZST (UTC+5)	Richard 41' (pen.); Opara 86'		Yunuszade 42'; Canales 77'	Stadium: Tofiq Bahramov Stadium^{1} Attendance: 3,820; Referee: Fariz Yusifov

== Final ==
28 May 2013
20:00 AZST (UTC+5)

Neftchi Baku	0 – 0	Khazar
Penalties
Canales (penalty scored); Bruno (penalty scored); Flavinho (penalty scored); Shukurov (penalty scored); Sadiqov (penalty scored)	5 – 3	(penalty missed) Sialmas; (penalty scored) Ramazanov; (penalty scored) Amirguliyev; (penalty scored) Tounkara

Tofiq Bahramov Stadium, Baku
Attendance: 20,000
Referee: Aliyar Ağayev

== Scorers ==
4 goals:

- (Azerbaijan) Aghabala Ramazanov, Khazar Lankaran

3 goals:

- (Ukraine) Yuriy Fomenko, Kəpəz
- (Azerbaijan) Novruz Alakbarov, Qaradağ

2 goals:

- (Latvia) Māris Verpakovskis, Baku
- (Georgia (country)) Bachana Tskhadadze, Inter Baku
- (Azerbaijan) Rahid Amirguliyev, Khazar Lankaran
- (Azerbaijan) Elvin Yunuszade, Neftchi Baku
- (Azerbaijan) Baxtiyar Fazai, FC Qala
- (Azerbaijan) Vüqar Nadirov, Qarabağ
- (Azerbaijan) Ruhid Yusubov, Qaradağ
- (Azerbaijan) Orxan Babayev, Taraggi

1 goal:

- (Azerbaijan) Shahriyar Aliyev, Baku
- (Azerbaijan) Tural Gurbatov, Baku
- (Azerbaijan) Agil Nabiyev, Baku
- (Romania) Marius Pena, Baku
- (Croatia) Aleksandar Šolić, Baku
- (Azerbaijan) Nicat Tagiyev, FC Ağsu
- (Brazil) Dodô, Gabala
- (Turkey) Muammer Erdoğdu, Gabala
- (France) Yannick Kamanan, Gabala
- (Georgia (country)) Ilia Kandelaki, Inter Baku
- (Senegal) Ibrahima Niasse, Inter Baku
- (Azerbaijan) Nizami Hajiyev, Inter Baku
- (Azerbaijan) Asif Mammadov, Inter Baku
- (Azerbaijan) Bakhtiyar Soltanov, Kəpəz
- (Argentina) Luciano Olguín, Khazar Lankaran
- (Azerbaijan) Uğur Pamuk, Khazar Lankaran
- (Azerbaijan) Branimir Subašić, Khazar Lankaran
- (Azerbaijan) Elnur Abbasov, Neftchala
- (Azerbaijan) Samir Abdulov, Neftchala
- (Azerbaijan) Araz Abdullayev, Neftchi Baku
- (Azerbaijan) Elshan Abdullayev, Neftchi Baku
- (Chile) Nicolás Canales, Neftchi Baku
- (Brazil) Flavinho, Neftchi Baku
- (Uzbekistan) Bahodir Nasimov, Neftchi Baku
- (Azerbaijan) Kamil Nurähmädov, Neftchi Baku
- (Paraguay) Éric Ramos, Neftchi Baku
- (Azerbaijan) Mahir Shukurov, Neftchi Baku
- (Azerbaijan) Afran Ismayilov, Qarabağ
- (Nigeria) Emeka Opara, Qarabağ
- (Brazil) Richard, Qarabağ
- (Azerbaijan) Rufat Mammadov, Qaradağ
- (Azerbaijan) Mehdi Mehdiyev, Qaradağ
- (Serbia) Miloš Adamović, Ravan Baku
- (Azerbaijan) Orkhan Lalayev, Ravan Baku
- (Serbia) Miloš Zečević, Ravan Baku
- (Argentina) Juan Manuel Varea, Ravan Baku
- (Azerbaijan) Ruslan Poladov, Simurq
- (Azerbaijan) Murad Hüseynov, Simurq
- (Azerbaijan) Azar Safarli, Taraggi
- (Azerbaijan) Farmayil Aliyev, Turan Tovuz

1 own goal:

- (North Macedonia) Bujamin Asani (playing for Kəpəz against Qarabağ)
