= Gökhan Güleç =

Turkish footballer

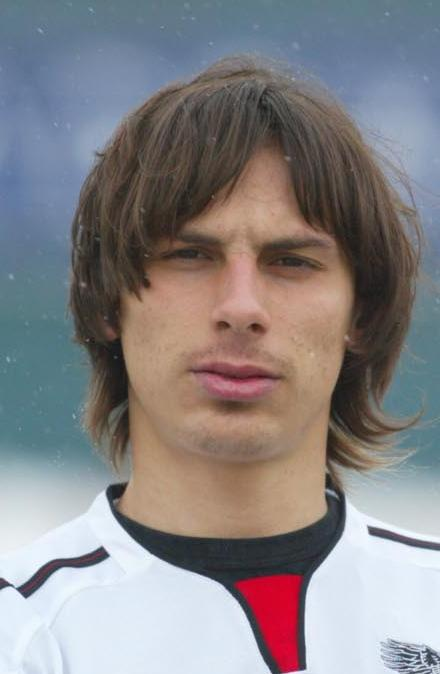

Personal information
- Date of birth: 25 September 1985 (age 41)
- Place of birth: İnegöl, Turkey
- Position: Striker

Youth career
- –2003: İnegölspor

Senior career*
Years	Team	Apps	(Gls)
2003–2005	İnegölspor	28	(11)
2005–2006	Gaziantepspor	6	(1)
2006–2007	Beşiktaş	25	(2)
2007–2008	Denizlispor	13	(1)
2008–2009	Bursaspor	28	(6)
2009–2012	Kasımpaşa	60	(13)
2012	Şanlıurfaspor	14	(0)
2013	Khazar Lankaran	11	(2)
2013–2014	İnegölspor	17	(1)

International career^{‡}
2005	Turkey U20	10	(4)
2006	Turkey U21	6	(1)
- * Club domestic league appearances and goals as of 30 March 2015 ‡ National team caps and goals as of 5 December 2009

Gökhan Güleç (born 25 September 1985) is a Turkish footballer who currently plays for Şanlıurfaspor.

== Career ==
Güleç was transferred to his previous club, Beşiktaş, on 17 January 2006 by French Manager Jean Tigana who was advised by Turkey national team manager Fatih Terim. He has currently scored 10 goals in 20 Turkish Super Cup games. In November 2009 he opened the scoring in his team's shock 1–3 away win at Fenerbahce. In five games, he had scored six goals in the first half of the 2009 season, in all competitions.

In December 2012, Güleç agreed to join Azerbaijan Premier League side Khazar Lankaran He played a total of 13 games, scoring twice before being released at the end of the 2012–13 season. Güleç is of Albanian origin.

== Honours ==
=== Club ===
Beşiktaş

- Turkish Cup: 2005–06, 2006–07
- Turkish Super Cup: 2006
