= Beto (footballer, born October 1981) =

Brazilian footballer

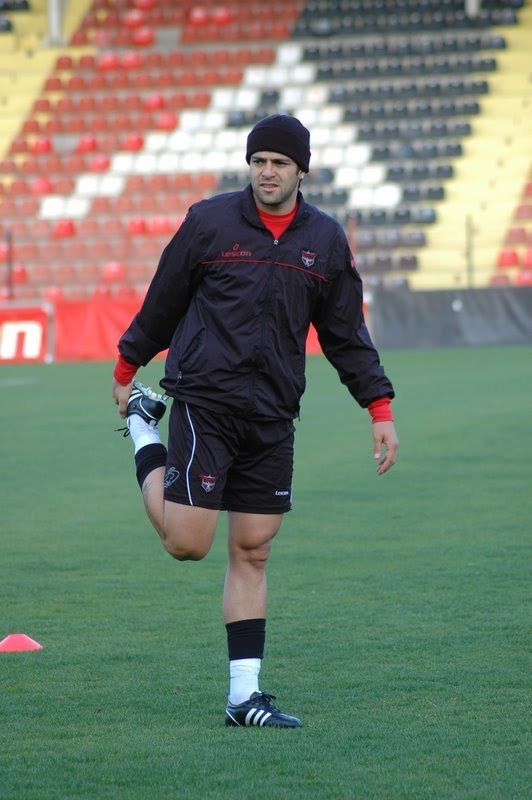

Personal information
- Full name: André Roberto Soares da Silva
- Date of birth: 25 October 1981 (age 45)
- Place of birth: São Carlos, Brazil
- Height: 1.80 m (5 ft 11 in)
- Position: Forward

Youth career
- 1995–1999: Ulbra

Senior career*
Years	Team	Apps	(Gls)
1999–2003	Ulbra		
2003–2005	Ferro Carril Oeste		
2005–2006	Criciúma		(18)
2007	Litex Lovech	39	(18)
2008–2011	Gaziantepspor	75	(23)
2011	→ Bucaspor	9	(0)
2011–2012	Mersin İdman Yurdu	18	(4)
2012	Khazar Lankaran	5	(0)
2013	Camboriú	3	(0)
2015	Novo Hamburgo	8	(0)
- * Club domestic league appearances and goals

André Roberto Soares da Silva or known as Beto (born 25 October 1981) is a Brazilian former professional footballer who played as a forward.

== Career ==
On 25 July 2003, Beto was signed by Ferro Carril Oeste. On 19 July 2005, he signed a deal until 31 December 2008 for Criciúma for which he was champion of Brazilian Série C (title won in 2006). However, on 2 January 2007, he left for Bulgaria's Litex Lovech.

He has also played for Internacional, Juventude in Brazil and Ulbra, Itual and Sero Kariu of Argentina.

In the summer of 2012 signed a contract with Khazar Lankaran. Beto had his contract with Khazar Lankaran cancelled in November 2012, after only playing 5 matches for the club.

== Career statistics ==
As of match played 4 November 2012

Appearances and goals by club, season and competition
Club	Season	League			National cup		Continental		Other		Total	
Club	Season	Division	Apps	Goals	Apps	Goals	Apps	Goals	Apps	Goals	Apps	Goals
Gaziantepspor	2007–08	Süper Lig	13	5	0	0	-		-		13	5
Gaziantepspor	2008–09	Süper Lig	27	11	2	0	-		-		27	11
Gaziantepspor	2009–10	Süper Lig	28	7	1	0	-		-		27	7
Gaziantepspor	2010–11	Süper Lig	8	0	2	1	-		-		10	0
Gaziantepspor	Total		76	23	5	1	-	-	-	-	81	24
Bucaspor (loan)	2010–11	Süper Lig	9	0	3	0	-		-		12	0
Mersin İdmanyurdu	2011–12	Süper Lig	18	4	0	0	-		-		18	4
Khazar Lankaran	2012–13	Azerbaijan Premier League	5	0	0	0	0	0	-		5	0
Career total			107	27	8	1	0	0	-	-	115	28
