= 2011–12 Azerbaijan First Division =

Azerbaijan First Division
- Season: 2011–12
- Champions: Qaradağ
- Matches: 182
- Goals: 481 (2.64 per match)

The 2011-12 Azerbaijan First Division is the second-level of football in Azerbaijan. Fourteen teams participated in Azerbaijani First Division in 2011-12.

== Teams ==
At the end of the 2010–11 season, champions FC Absheron and runners-up was initially must be promoted but due financial difficulties, FC Absheron became defunct, while FK Mughan was demoted to first division and replaced by Sumgayit City F.C. A further three places were given to Taraggi FC, Lokomotiv-Bilajary FK and Həkəri FK, who will be debutantes from this season. In November 2011, Həkəri FK' owners announced that club will be dissolved and all of their results in Azerbaijan First Division will be annulled. On 10 April 2012, FK Qaradağ sealed promotion to league after winning first division. However, due decision of Association of Football Federations of Azerbaijan about licensing, no clubs from division will be promoted which means all clubs from last season will be remaining in the league.

Location of teams in 2011-12 Azerbaijan First Division

Team	Location	Stadium	Stadium capacity
Bakili Baku	Baku	Shafa Stadium	8,000
Energetik	Mingachevir	Yashar Mammadzade Stadium	5,000
Göyazan	Qazakh	Qazakh City Stadium	15,000
Karvan	Yevlakh	Yevlakh Stadium	5,000
Lokomotiv-Bilajary	Baku	FK Baku training ground	1,000
MKT Araz	Imishli	Heydar Aliyev Stadium	8,500
MOIK Baku	Baku	MOIK Stadium	3,000
Mughan	Salyan	Salyan Olympic Sport Complex Stadium	2,000
Neftchala	Neftchala	Nariman Narimanov Stadium	2,000
Qaradağ	Lökbatan	Lökbatan Olympic Sport Complex Stadium	2,000
Shahdag	Qusar	Şövkət Orduxanov Stadium	4,000
Shamkir	Şəmkir	Shamkir City Stadium	11,500
Shusha	Baku	Shafa Stadium	8,000
Taraggi	Ganja	Ganja City Stadium	25,000

== League table ==
Pos	Team	Pld	W	D	L	GF	GA	GD	Pts
1	Qaradağ (C)	26	21	2	3	45	9	+36	65
2	Karvan	26	17	4	5	55	22	+33	55
3	Neftchala	26	16	7	3	42	16	+26	55
4	Şahdağ	26	13	6	7	46	33	+13	45
5	Bakili	26	11	5	10	36	28	+8	38
6	Lokomotiv-Bilajary	26	10	6	10	37	33	+4	36
7	FK MKT-Araz	26	11	3	12	35	43	−8	36
8	Şəmkir	26	9	6	11	38	38	0	33
9	Tərəqqi	26	9	4	13	28	30	−2	31
10	Mughan	26	9	4	13	26	43	−17	31
11	Şuşa	26	7	8	11	21	23	−2	29
12	Energetik	26	6	7	13	21	45	−24	25
13	MOIK Baku	26	7	4	15	34	44	−10	25
14	Göyəzən	26	1	4	21	17	74	−57	7

Source: Soccerway
Rules for classification: 1) points; 2) goal difference; 3) number of goals scored.
(C) Champions

== Results ==
Home \ Away	SSQ	KAR	GYZ	BKL	ENG	LBA	MOI	ABB	NEF	QAR	SHA	SHU	TAR	MUG
Şahdağ		1–1	5–1	2–1	3–1	2–0	1–1	2–1	4–1	1–0	1–0	1–0	2–1	2–1
Karvan	2–2		3–0	1–0	5–0	4–0	4–1	2–0	0–1	0–2	4–1	2–1	2–1	2–0
Göyəzən	1–5	1–3		0–2	0–0	1–1	1–6	0–2	1–4	0–3	1–3	1–0	0–0	1–1
Bakili	2–1	0–3	1–0		3–0	5–1	0–1	4–0	0–0	0–1	1–1	0–0	1–0	7–0
Energetik	1–1	1–0	2–1	3–0		3–1	3–1	0–0	0–0	0–2	1–1	0–0	1–0	2–4
Lokomotiv-Bilajary	1–0	1–1	4–0	0–0	4–0		1–0	6–2	1–2	0–0	3–2	1–0	1–1	1–2
MOIK Baku	1–2	0–3	3–0	2–0	2–1	0–4		2–1	1–2	0–1	1–2	1–2	2–3	0–0
FK MKT-Araz	3–2	0–2	4–1	1–2	0–0	1–1	4–2		1–0	0–1	0–5	3–2	2–1	4–1
Neftchala	2–0	1–1	5–1	2–0	5–1	1–0	2–2	1–0		1–1	2–0	0–0	3–1	2–0
Qaradağ Lökbatan	2–0	4–0	3–0	3–2	5–0	2–1	1–0	2–0	0–1		1–0	0–1	1–0	2–1
Şəmkir	3–3	1–2	4–2	2–3	3–0	2–1	0–2	2–3	0–2	0–3		1–1	0–0	1–0
Şuşa	3–2	2–0	3–0	0–1	1–0	0–1	2–2	0–1	0–0	0–2	1–1		0–1	1–1
Tərəqqi	3–1	1–2	4–1	0–0	2–1	2–0	2–1	0–1	0–2	1–2	0–2	1–0		2–0
Mughan	0–0	0–6	3–2	4–1	1–0	0–2	2–0	2–1	1–0	0–1	0–1	0–1	2–1	

Source: Soccerway: Azerbaijan First Division Table
Legend: Blue = home team win; Yellow = draw; Red = away team win.
