= Qazakh City Stadium =

Coordinates: 41.0933°N 45.3661°E

- Interactive map of Qazakh City Stadium
- Location: Qazakh, Azerbaijan
- Capacity: 15,000
- Surface: Grass

Tenant
- Göyazan Qazakh FK

Qazakh City Stadium (Azerbaijani: Qazax şəhər stadionu) is a multi-use stadium in Qazakh, Azerbaijan. It is currently used mostly for football matches and is the home stadium of Göyazan Qazakh FK. The stadium holds 15,000 people.

== See also ==
- List of football stadiums in Azerbaijan
