= Həkəri FK =

- Full name: Həkəri Futbol Klubu
- Founded: 2002
- Dissolved: 2011
- Ground: Inshaatchy Stadium, Sumqayit, Azerbaijan
- Capacity: 2,000
- League: Azerbaijan First Division
Home colours	Away colours

Həkəri FK (Azerbaijani: Həkəri Futbol Klubu), also known as FK Hakari, was an Azerbaijani football club based in Baku and home games played in Sumqayit, even though it represents the city of Qubadlı, which is controlled by Nagorno-Karabakh Republic (de facto independent, but recognized only by 3 non-UN member states) but de jure is a part of Azerbaijan.

== History ==
The club was established in 2002 by club's current chairman and manager Javanshir Aliyev as an amateur football club. In 2011, the club transformed into the professional club and immediately admitted to the Azerbaijan First Division in 2011.

In 2011, club's owners announced that club will be dissolved and all of their results in Azerbaijan First Division will be annulled.

== Honours ==
- AFFA Amateur League

Winners (1) : 2003–04
