= Cevat Güler =

Turkish footballer and coach

Personal information
- Date of birth: 12 March 1959 (age 67)
- Place of birth: Perşembe, Turkey
- Height: 1.84 m (6 ft 0 in)

Senior career*
Years	Team	Apps	(Gls)
- Beşiktaş

Managerial career
- 1992–1997: Gaziosmanpaşaspor (youth)
- 1999–2000: Beşiktaş (youth)
- 2000–2001: Kartal Belediyespor
- 2007–2008: Galatasaray (assistant)
- 2008: Galatasaray (interim)
- 2008–2009: Galatasaray (assistant)
- 2012: Ravan Baku
- 2013: Orduspor
- * Club domestic league appearances and goals

Cevat Güler (born 12 March 1959 in Perşembe, Ordu Province) is a Turkish former football player and coach.

== Coaching career ==
After Karl Heinz Feldkamp resigned at the end of 2007–08 season, he took over the managership and became the first coach to win the Süper Lig by joining a club after the season start. Players of Galatasaray nicknamed him "father" after this success.

Following Michael Skibbe's managership control at Galatasaray, Cevat Güler became one of the assistant coaches of the Galatasaray football team. His contract was not expanded by the club after the arrival of Frank Rijkaard in 2009 summer.

Güler was appointed manager of Azerbaijani Premier League side Ravan Baku on 12 July 2012. He lasted six weeks before being sacked on 25 August 2012. In total he managed four games in the Azerbaijan Premier League drawing three and losing one. On 13 April 2013, Güler replaced Hector Cuper as manager of Süper Lig side Orduspor He lost his first game in charge on 20 April 2013 against Kasımpaşa.

== Manager statistics ==
As of 19 March 2014

Team	Nat	Managerial Tenure	P	W	D	L	Win %
Galatasaray (Interim)	Turkey	April 2008 - June 2008	6	6	0	0	100
Ravan Baku	Azerbaijan	12 July 2012 - 25 August 2012	4	0	3	1	0
Orduspor	Turkey	13 April 2013 - May 2014	5	0	0	5	0

== Honours ==
Galatasaray

- Süper Lig: 2007–08
