= Luciano Olguín =

Argentine footballer

Personal information
- Full name: Luciano Esteban Olguín
- Date of birth: 9 March 1982 (age 44)
- Place of birth: Coronel Vidal, Argentina
- Height: 1.88 m (6 ft 2 in)
- Position: Striker

Youth career
- 1990–1997: Sarmiento
- 1997–2000: Independiente
- 2000–2002: Racing Club

Senior career*
Years	Team	Apps	(Gls)
2004	Racing Club	2	(0)
2004	San Martín (SJ)	4	(0)
2005–2008	Royal Antwerp	65	(18)
2008–2009	K.S.K. Beveren	24	(9)
2009–2010	Pierikos	25	(6)
2010–2011	Tianjin Teda	36	(15)
2012	Hohhot Dongjin	15	(0)
2013	Khazar Lankaran	5	(0)
2013	Almirante Brown	5	(0)
2014	Tampa Bay Rowdies	6	(0)
Total		187	(48)
- * Club domestic league appearances and goals

Luciano Olguín (Latin American Spanish: [luˈsjano olˈɣwin]; born March 9, 1982) is a retired Argentine footballer who played as a striker.

== Club career ==
Olguín has previously played professional football for Racing Club and San Martín de San Juan in Argentina and Royal Antwerp F.C. in Belgium and moved to China to join Chinese Super League side Tianjin Teda on 27 July 2010.

On 24 September 2011, he suffered a depressed skull fracture during a league match against Guangzhou Evergrande, ruling him out for the rest of the season. Tianjin Teda decided not to extent his contract at the end of the 2011 league season.

Olguín signed a contract with China League One side Hohhot Dongjin in March 2012. He suffered a broken cheekbone in April 2012. Olguín played 15 league matches for Hohhot without scoring and was released at the end of the season.

Olguín signed a contract with Azerbaijan side Khazar Lankaran in February 2013. Olguín was released by Khazar at the end of the 2012–13 season. Following his release from Khazar Lanakran, Olguín signed for Argentinian Primera B Nacional side Aldosivi. On 4 July 2014, Olguín signed with the Tampa Bay Rowdies of the North American Soccer League. Olguín scored in his debut, a Fourth of July friendly against the Fort Lauderdale Strikers.

== Career statistics ==
Appearances and goals by club, season and competition
Club	Season	League			National cup		Continental		Total	
Club	Season	Division	Apps	Goals	Apps	Goals	Apps	Goals	Apps	Goals
Racing Club	2004–05	Argentine Primera División	2	0	—		—		2	0
San Martín (SJ)	2005–06	Primera B Nacional	4	0	—		—		4	0
Royal Antwerp	2005–06	Belgian Second Division	14	3	0	0	—		14	3
Royal Antwerp	2006–07	Belgian Second Division	30	4	5	2	—		35	6
Royal Antwerp	2007–08	Belgian Second Division	21	11	1	0	—		22	11
Royal Antwerp	Total		65	18	6	2	—		71	20
K.S.K. Beveren	2008–09	Belgian Second Division	24	9	2	1	—		26	10
Pierikos	2009–10	Beta Ethniki	25	6	2	1	—		27	7
Tianjin Teda	2010	Chinese Super League	14	6	—		—		14	6
Tianjin Teda	2011	Chinese Super League	22	9	0	0	6	1	28	10
Tianjin Teda	Total		36	15	0	0	6	1	42	16
Hohhot Dongjin	2012	China League One	15	0	1	0	—		16	0
Khazar Lankaran	2012–13	Azerbaijan Premier League	5	0	3	1	—		8	1
Almirante Brown	2012–13	Primera B Nacional	5	0	0	0	—		5	0
Tampa Bay Rowdies	2014	NASL	6	0	—		—		6	0
Career total			187	48	14	5	6	1	207	54
