= Taraggi FK =

- Full name: Tərəqqi Futbol Klubu
- Founded: 2011; 14 years ago
- Dissolved: 2013; 12 years ago
- League: Azerbaijan First Division
- 2012–13: 6th

Taraggi FK (Azerbaijani: Tərəqqi Futbol Klubu) was an Azerbaijani football club based in Ganja.

== History ==
The club was founded in 2011 after division of FC Kəpəz, where FC Kəpəz promoted to Azerbaijan Premier League, while Taraggi will be playing in Azerbaijan First Division in 2011 as independent club.

On 21 April 2013, the club announced to be defunct after financial problems and stopped their participation in First Division.

== League and domestic cup history ==
Season	Div.	Pos.	Pl.	W	D	L	GS	GA	P	Domestic Cup
2011–12	2nd	9	26	9	4	13	28	30	31	Preliminary Round
2012–13	2nd	6	24	12	1	11	24	24	37	Second Round

== Managers ==
- (Azerbaijan) Fuad Ismayilov (2011)
- (Azerbaijan) Vasif Aliyev (2012–2013)
