= 2012–13 Azerbaijan Premier League =

Azerbaijan Premier League
- Season: 2012–13
- Champions: Neftchi (8th title)
- Relegated: Kəpəz, Turan
- Champions League: Neftchi
- Europa League: Qarabağ; Khazar; Inter Baku
- Matches: 192
- Goals: 467 (2.43 per match)
- Top goalscorer: Nicolás Canales (26 goals)
- Biggest home win: Neftchi 8–1 Sumgayit
- Biggest away win: Sumgayit 1–6 Qarabağ
- Highest scoring: Neftchi 8–1 Sumgayit (9 goals)
- Longest winning run: 5 games Neftchi, Qarabağ
- Longest unbeaten run: 11 games Qarabağ
- Longest losing run: 9 games Kəpəz
- Highest attendance: 11,000; Khazar 2–3 Inter (12 February 2013)
- Lowest attendance: 30; Turan 0–2 Azal (20 October 2012)
- Average attendance: 5,462

The 2012–13 Azerbaijan Premier League was the twenty-first season of the Premier League since its establishment in 1992. The season began on 4 August 2012 and finished on 20 May 2013. Neftchi Baku, the champions from the previous season, defended their title.

== Teams ==
Location of teams in 2012–13 Azerbaijan Premier League

A total of 12 teams contested the league, including all 12 sides from the 2011–12 season, as no teams were promoted from the 2011–12 Azerbaijan First Division.

On 10 April 2012, FK Qaradağ sealed promotion to the league after winning the first division. However, due to a decision by AFFA about licensing, no clubs were promoted which meant all clubs from the previous season remained in the league.

=== Stadia and locations ===
Note: Table lists in alphabetical order.

Team	Location	Venue	Capacity
AZAL	Baku	AZAL Stadium	3,000
Baku	Baku	FC Baku's Training Base	2,000
Gabala	Gabala	Gabala City Stadium	4,000
Inter	Baku	Shafa Stadium	8,000
Kəpəz	Ganja	Ganja City Stadium	25,000
Khazar	Lankaran	Lankaran City Stadium	15,000
Neftchi	Baku	Bakcell Arena	11,000
Qarabağ	Baku	Tofig Bahramov Stadium	31,200
Ravan Baku	Baku	Bayil Stadium	5,000
Simurq	Zaqatala	Zaqatala City Stadium	3,500
Sumgayit	Sumqayit	Mehdi Huseynzade Stadium	16,000
Turan	Tovuz	Tovuz City Stadium	6,800

=== Personnel and sponsoring ===
Note: Flags indicate national team as has been defined under FIFA eligibility rules. Players may hold more than one non-FIFA nationality.

Team	Manager	Team captain	Kit manufacturer	Shirt sponsor
AZAL	(Azerbaijan) Vagif Sadygov	(Azerbaijan) Jahangir Hasanzade	Umbro	Silk Way
Baku	(Serbia) Božidar Bandović	(Azerbaijan) Elvin Mammadov	Macron	
Gabala	(Spain) Luis Aragón (caretaker)	(Azerbaijan) Vurğun Hüseynov	Erreà	Hyundai
Inter Baku	(Georgia (country)) Kakhaber Tskhadadze	(Azerbaijan) Vladimir Levin	Umbro	IBA
Kəpəz	(Azerbaijan) Mahmud Gurbanov	(Azerbaijan) Khayal Zeynalov	Adidas	Nakhchivan Car Factory
Khazar	(Wales) John Toshack	(Azerbaijan) Rahid Amirguliyev	Puma	Palmali
Neftchi Baku	(Azerbaijan) Boyukagha Hajiyev	(Azerbaijan) Rashad Sadigov	Adidas	SOCAR
Qarabağ	(Azerbaijan) Gurban Gurbanov	(Azerbaijan) Rashad Sadygov	Adidas	Azersun
Ravan Baku	(Azerbaijan) Ramil Aliyev	(Azerbaijan) Tural Akhundov	Legea	NBC Bank
Simurq	(Georgia (country)) Giorgi Chikhradze	(Azerbaijan) Rasim Ramaldanov	Umbro	
Sumgayit	(Germany) Bernhard Raab	(Azerbaijan) Samir Abbasov	Umbro	Azerkimya
Turan	(Azerbaijan) Afghan Talybov	(Azerbaijan) Hafiz Aliyev	Umbro	Bank of Azerbaijan

=== Managerial changes ===
Team	Outgoing manager	Manner of departure	Date of vacancy	Position in table	Incoming manager	Date of appointment
Ravan Baku	(Azerbaijan) Bahman Hasanov	Sacked	8 June 2012	Pre-season	(Turkey) Cevat Güler	12 July 2011
Baku	(Azerbaijan) Novruz Azimov	Sacked	19 July 2012	Pre-season	(Serbia) Božidar Bandović	19 July 2012
Kəpəz	(Azerbaijan) Fuad Ismayilov	Resigned	19 August 2012	12th	(Azerbaijan) Mahmud Gurbanov	19 August 2012
Ravan Baku	(Turkey) Cevat Güler	Sacked	25 August 2012	8th	(Azerbaijan) Bahman Hasanov	25 August 2012
Ravan Baku	(Azerbaijan) Bahman Hasanov	End of tenure as caretaker	24 September 2012	11th	(Bosnia and Herzegovina) Kemal Alispahić	24 September 2012
Gabala	(Turkey) Fatih Kavlak	Sacked	24 September 2012	5th	(Azerbaijan) Ramiz Mammadov	24 September 2012
Turan	(Azerbaijan) Asgar Abdullayev	Resigned	12 October 2012	10th	(Azerbaijan) Afghan Talybov	12 October 2012
Khazar	(Azerbaijan) Yunis Huseynov	Resigned	31 October 2012	7th	(Spain) Erik Roqueta Capilla (caretaker)	1 November 2012
Khazar	(Spain) Erik Roqueta Capilla	End of tenure as caretaker	14 November 2012	4th	(Spain) Carles Martorell Baqués	14 November 2012
Ravan Baku	(Bosnia and Herzegovina) Kemal Alispahić	Sacked	21 December 2012	11th	(Azerbaijan) Ramil Aliyev	21 December 2012
Khazar	(Spain) Carles Martorell Baqués	Resigned	26 February 2013	7th	(Wales) John Toshack	8 March 2013
Gabala	(Azerbaijan) Ramiz Mammadov	Sacked	2 April 2013	6th	(Spain) Luis Aragón (caretaker)	2 April 2013

== First round ==
=== League table ===
Pos	Team	Pld	W	D	L	GF	GA	GD	Pts	Qualification
1	Neftçi Baku	22	14	2	6	47	24	+23	44	Qualification for championship group
2	Inter Baku	22	11	8	3	24	12	+12	41	Qualification for championship group
3	Qarabağ	22	10	9	3	30	19	+11	39	Qualification for championship group
4	Simurq	22	9	9	4	25	15	+10	36	Qualification for championship group
5	Gabala	22	9	5	8	26	27	−1	32	Qualification for championship group
6	Baku	22	6	12	4	24	15	+9	30	Qualification for championship group
7	AZAL	22	7	8	7	32	25	+7	29	Qualification for relegation group
8	Khazar Lankaran	22	7	7	8	32	27	+5	28	Qualification for relegation group
9	Turan	22	6	5	11	24	35	−11	23	Qualification for relegation group
10	Sumgayit	22	5	7	10	20	39	−19	22	Qualification for relegation group
11	Ravan Baku	22	6	4	12	23	36	−13	22	Qualification for relegation group
12	Kapaz	22	2	4	16	12	45	−33	10	Qualification for relegation group

Source: Association of Football Federations of Azerbaijan and Soccerway.com
Rules for classification: 1) points; 2) goal difference; 3) number of goals scored.

=== Results ===
Home \ Away	AZL	BAK	KAP	INT	KHA	SIM	NEF	QAR	GAB	RAV	SUM	TUR
AZAL		2–1	3–0	0–0	0–2	1–1	1–2	6–2	6–1	3–1	1–1	0–0
Baku	2–0		3–1	0–0	2–0	0–0	1–2	0–0	1–1	2–1	1–1	1–1
Kapaz	0–2	0–0		0–2	0–1	1–1	0–3	0–0	1–0	0–2	0–0	1–2
Inter Baku	0–0	1–0	3–1		0–0	1–0	1–1	1–1	2–1	2–0	1–0	2–0
Khazar Lankaran	1–2	1–1	4–0	2–3		0–2	2–1	2–0	1–1	4–0	2–2	4–2
Simurq	1–1	0–0	2–1	1–0	2–2		0–2	0–0	1–1	3–0	1–0	3–0
Neftçi Baku	4–2	1–1	4–1	2–0	2–1	2–1		0–1	3–0	2–0	2–1	2–1
Qarabağ	2–0	1–1	3–1	0–0	1–0	2–1	1–0		1–2	0–0	3–0	1–1
Gabala	0–0	0–2	2–0	1–0	2–0	0–1	2–1	1–1		1–3	4–1	0–1
Ravan Baku	1–0	1–1	1–2	0–2	1–1	0–2	2–0	2–3	1–3		2–3	2–0
Sumgayit	2–2	1–0	2–1	0–0	1–1	0–1	3–2	1–6	0–1	0–1		0–1
Turan	1–0	0–4	5–1	2–3	2–1	1–1	2–3	0–1	0–2	2–2	0–1	

Source: Soccerway: Azerbaijan Premier League Table
Legend: Blue = home team win; Yellow = draw; Red = away team win.

== Second round ==
=== Championship group ===
The top six teams of the first phase participate in this group, which will decide which team will win the championship. Additionally, teams in this group compete for one 2013–14 Champions League and two Europa League spots.

The winners will qualify for the Champions League Second qualifying round, with the runners-up and third place team earning a spot in the Europa League first qualifying round.

==== Table ====
Pos	Team	Pld	W	D	L	GF	GA	GD	Pts	Qualification
1	Neftçi Baku (C)	32	19	5	8	59	32	+27	62	Qualification for Champions League second qualifying round
2	Qarabağ	32	16	11	5	43	26	+17	59	Qualification for Europa League first qualifying round
3	Inter Baku	32	16	9	7	38	22	+16	57	Qualification for Europa League first qualifying round
4	Simurq	32	12	12	8	32	26	+6	48	
5	Baku	32	9	14	9	33	27	+6	41	
6	Gabala	32	10	8	14	32	40	−8	38	

Source: Soccerway.com
Rules for classification: 1) points; 2) goal difference; 3) number of goals scored.
(C) Champions

==== Results ====
Home \ Away	BAK	GAB	INT	NEF	QAR	SIM
Baku		0–1	1–2	1–1	0–1	2–1
Gabala	1–1		1–2	1–1	0–2	1–1
Inter Baku	2–1	1–0		0–1	0–0	5–0
Neftçi Baku	0–1	2–1	2–0		1–2	1–1
Qarabağ	3–1	1–0	3–2	1–2		0–0
Simurq	0–1	2–0	1–0	0–1	1–0	

Source: Soccerway
Legend: Blue = home team win; Yellow = draw; Red = away team win.

=== Relegation group ===
The bottom six teams of the first phase will determine the teams to be relegated to the 2013–14 Azerbaijan First Division. The two teams who finish in 11th and 12th position will be relegated to the 2013–14 Azerbaijan First Division.

==== Table ====
Pos	Team	Pld	W	D	L	GF	GA	GD	Pts	Qualification or relegation
7	AZAL	32	16	9	7	57	32	+25	57	
8	Khazar Lankaran	32	10	10	12	40	37	+3	40	Qualification for Europa League first qualifying round (Note: Khazar Lankaran qualified for the first qualifying round of the 2013–14 UEFA Europa League as winner of the 2012–13 Azerbaijan Cup.)
9	Ravan Baku	32	12	4	16	46	53	−7	40	
10	Sumgayit	32	9	8	15	31	49	−18	35	
11	Turan (R)	32	8	6	18	34	59	−25	30	Relegation to Azerbaijan First Division
12	Kapaz (R)	32	5	4	23	22	64	−42	19	Relegation to Azerbaijan First Division

Source: Association of Football Federations of Azerbaijan
Rules for classification: 1) points; 2) goal difference; 3) number of goals scored.
(R) Relegated

==== Results ====
Home \ Away	AZL	KAP	KHA	RAV	SUM	TUR
AZAL		4–0	2–0	3–2	1–0	2–0
Kapaz	1–3		1–2	3–1	1–0	0–1
Khazar Lankaran	1–1	1–0		1–2	0–0	1–0
Ravan Baku	3–5	3–0	1–0		3–0	1–0
Sumgayit	0–2	1–0	1–0	4–1		4–0
Turan	0–2	3–5	2–2	2–6	2–1	

Source: Soccerway
Legend: Blue = home team win; Yellow = draw; Red = away team win.

== Season statistics ==
=== Top scorers ===
As of 14 May 2013

Rank	Player	Club	Goals
1	(Chile) Nicolás Canales	Neftchi Baku	26
2	(Brazil) Nildo	AZAL	21
3	(Argentina) Juan Varea	Ravan Baku	14
4	(Brazil) Richard Almeida	Qarabağ	13
5	(Mali) Salif Ballo	Turan	12
6	(Azerbaijan) Pardis Fardjad-Azad	Sumgayit	9
7	(Ukraine) Yuriy Fomenko	Kəpəz / Inter Baku	8
7	(Georgia (country)) Bachana Tskhadadze	Inter Baku	8
7	(Sierra Leone) Julius Wobay	Neftchi Baku	8
10	(Morocco) Zouhir Benouahi	AZAL	7
11	(Bosnia and Herzegovina) Mario Božić	Simurq	6
11	(Brazil) Flavinho	Neftchi Baku	6
11	(Romania) Marius Pena	Baku	6
11	(Lithuania) Mindaugas Kalonas	Ravan Baku	6
11	(Greece) Dimitris Sialmas	Khazar	6
11	(Senegal) Victor Mendy	Gabala	6

Source: Azerbaijan Premier League

=== Hat-tricks ===
Player	For	Against	Result	Date
(Brazil) Nildo^{4}	AZAL	Qarabağ	6–2	16 September 2012
(Chile) Nicolás Canales^{4}	Neftchi Baku	Sumgayit	8–1	17 November 2012
(Mali) Salif Ballo	Turan	Kəpəz	5–1	2 December 2012
(Azerbaijan) Pardis Fardjad-Azad^{4}	Sumgayit	Turan	4–0	11 March 2013
(Argentina) Juan Varea	Ravan Baku	Turan	6–2	30 March 2013

- ^{4} Player scored 4 goals

=== Scoring ===
- First goal of the season: Irakli Beraia for Kəpəz against Turan Tovuz (4 August 2012)
- Fastest goal of the season: 1st minute, Yannick Kamanan for Gabala against Khazar Lankaran (22 February 2013)
- Latest goal of the season: 94 minutes and 33 seconds, Slavčo Georgievski for Inter Baku against Turan Tovuz (25 August 2012)
- Largest winning margin: 7 goals
  - Neftchi Baku 8–1 Sumgayit (17 November 2012)
- Highest scoring game: 9 goals
  - Neftchi Baku 8–1 Sumgayit (17 November 2012)
- Most goals scored in a match by a single team: 8 goals
  - Neftchi Baku 8–1 Sumgayit (17 November 2012)
- Most goals scored in a match by a losing team: 3 goals
  - Turan Tovuz 3–5 Kəpəz (13 May 2013)
  - Ravan Baku 3–5 AZAL (14 May 2013)

=== Clean sheets ===
- Most clean sheets: 16
  - Inter Baku
  - Qarabağ
- Fewest clean sheets: 5
  - Kəpəz
  - Turan Tovuz

=== Discipline ===
- Most yellow cards (club): 96
  - Kəpəz
- Most yellow cards (player): 14
  - Samuel Barlay (Ravan Baku)
- Most red cards (club): 8
  - Khazar Lankaran
  - Simurq
- Most red cards (player): 3
  - Aleksandr Chertoganov (Gabala)
