= Qala FK =

Qala Goranboy FK
- Full name: Qala Goranboy Futbol Klubu
- Founded: 2023
- League: Azerbaijan Region League

Qala Goranboy FK (Azerbaijani: Qala Futbol Klubu) was an Azerbaijani football club based in Goranboy. The team is currently playing in the AFFA Region League.

== History ==
The club was established in 2023 and immediately joined Azerbaijan Region League.

== Stadium ==
Qala's home ground was Goranboy Olympic Sport Complex Stadium, which has a capacity of 1,500.
