= Shusha FK =

FC Shusha
- Full name: Şuşa Futbol Klubu
- Founded: 1 September 2009; 15 years ago
- Dissolved: 18 July 2015; 9 years ago
- Ground: Shafa Stadium (IV field), Baku, Azerbaijan
- Capacity: 8,152
- Chairman: Azeri Huseynov
- Manager: Nadir Gasymov
- League: Azerbaijan First Division
- 2013–14: 6th
Home colours	Away colours

Shusha FK (Azerbaijani: Şuşa Futbol Klubu) was an Azerbaijani football club based in Baku. It represented the city of Shusha.

== History ==
The club was founded on 1 September 2009 as Shusha, then changed its name to Shusha 09. In 2010, the club once again returned to its old name and immediately admitted to the Azerbaijan First Division in 2010.

Shusha FK was dissolved on 18 July 2015, after main sponsors SOCAR stopped funding the club.

== League and domestic cup history ==
As of 16 March 2012:

Season	Div.	Pos.	Pl.	W	D	L	GS	GA	P	Domestic Cup
2010–11	2nd	12	26	3	8	15	20	41	17	1/8 Finals
2011–12	2nd	11	26	7	8	11	21	23	29	1/16 Finals
2012–13	2nd	9	24	7	2	15	29	40	23	1/16 Finals
2013–14	2nd	6	30	15	9	6	60	26	54	Second Round
2014–15	2nd	8	30	14	4	12	49	31	46	Did not enter

== Managers ==
- (Azerbaijan) Evez Mamedov (2009–2010)
- (Turkey) Metin Demirkiran (2010)
- (Azerbaijan) Nadir Gasymov (2010–2015)

            Guleli Bagirov prezident (23.05.2016)
