= Lokomotiv-Bilajary FK =

FK Lokomotiv Biləcəri
- Full name: Lokomotiv Biləcəri Futbol Klubu
- Nickname(s): Loko
- Founded: 2011; 14 years ago
- Dissolved: 2015; 10 years ago
- Chairman: Senan Mammedov
- Manager: Ibrahim Uzunca
- League: Azerbaijan First Division
- 2013–14: 10th
Home colours	Away colours

Lokomotiv-Bilajary FK (Azerbaijani: Lokomotiv-Biləcəri Futbol Klubu), was an Azerbaijani football club based in Biləcəri, Baku.

== History ==
The club was founded in 2011, which is based on FK Baku's under 17 team that won Azerbaijani championship.

In February 2015 the club was dissolved, with the players not being paid for over a year.

== League and domestic cup history ==
Season	Div.	Pos.	Pl.	W	D	L	GS	GA	P	Domestic Cup
2011–12	2nd	6	26	10	6	10	37	33	36	1/16 Finals
2012–13	2nd	8	24	7	3	14	28	38	24	1/16 Finals
2013–14	2nd	10	30	12	3	15	42	58	39	First round
2014–15	2nd	16	30	3	1	26	10	72	10	First round
