= 2026–27 Gabala FK season =

Gabala
2026–27 season
- President: Fariz Najafov
- Manager: Kakhaber Tskhadadze (until 31 August); Milos Jevtic & Amil Agajanov (Acting) (31 August - 20 September); Jeton Beqiri (from 20 September)
- Stadium: City Stadium
- Premier League: 10th
- Azerbaijan Cup: Last 16
- Top goalscorer: League: Five Players (1); All: Eight Players (1)

The 2026–27 season is Gabala FK's 22nd season, and their 2nd season back in the Azerbaijan Premier League, after being relegated to the Azerbaijan First Division at the end of the 2023–24 season.

== Season overview ==
On 25 June, Gabala announced that they had extended their contract with Seydina Keita until the summer of 2027.

On 29 June, Gabala announced the signing of Kouya Mabea from Floriana to a one-year contract, with the option of a second year.

On 30 June, Gabala announced the signing of Nathan Monzango from Bravo to a one-year contract, with the option of a second year.

On 2 July, Gabala announced that they had extended their contract with Səlahət Ağayev until the end of the season.

On 6 July, Gabala announced that they had parted ways with Seydina Keita by mutual agreement due to personal circumstances relating to Keita.

On 7 July, Gabala announced that they had parted ways with Eduardo Kunde by mutual agreement.

On 9 July, Gabala announced the signing of Karim Rossi, who'd most recently played for Şamaxı, to a two-year contract.

On 21 July, Gabala announced the signing of Meshack Ubochioma from Kazincbarcikai, to a one-year contract with the option of an additional year.

On 27 July, Prince Owusu left Gabala to sign for DAC 1904.

On 28 July, Gabala announced the signing of Bruno Silva from Oliveirense, to a one-year contract with the option of an additional year.

On 1 August, Gabala announced the season-long loan signing of Arthur Motta from Beroe.

On 10 August, Gabala announced the signing of Edson Eduardo from Vestri to a three-year contract.

On 31 August, Kakhaber Tskhadadze left his role as head coach after his contract was terminated by mutual agreement.

On 16 September 2026, Gabala announced the appointment of Jeton Beqiri as their new head coach, commencing 20 September, to a one-year contract with the option of an additional two season. Also on 16 September, Gabala announced the return of Elvin Camalov to the club on a two-year contract.

On 25 September, Gabala announced the return to the club of Raphael Utzig, on a contract until the end of the season.

On 3 October, Gabala announced the signing of free-agent Endri Çekiçi on a contract until the end of the season.

== Squad ==
As of match played 7 November 2026

No.	Name	Nationality	Position	Date of birth (age)	Signed from	Signed in	Contract ends	Apps.	Goals
Goalkeepers
1	Səlahət Ağayev	(Azerbaijan)	GK	4 January 1991 (age 35)	Sabail	2024	2027	99	0
32	Arthur Motta	(Brazil)	GK	8 August 2001 (age 25)	on loan from Beroe	2026	2027	0	0
94	Habib Hushanov	(Azerbaijan)	GK	16 October 2007 (age 19)	Academy	2023		5	0
Defenders
2	Aqşin Yaqubov	(Azerbaijan)	DF	8 October 2005 (age 21)	Academy	2026		0	0
3	Edson Eduardo	(Brazil)	DF	22 May 2002 (age 24)	Vestri	2026	2029	11	0
5	Nathan Monzango	(Democratic Republic of the Congo)	DF	18 April 2001 (age 25)	Bravo	2026	2027 (+1)	11	0
12	Kouya Mabea	(Ivory Coast)	DF	23 October 1998 (age 28)	Floriana	2026	2027 (+1)	10	1
13	Nicat Aliyev	(Azerbaijan)	DF	24 September 2001 (age 25)	Sumgayit	2022		93	6
16	Isaac Amoah	(Ghana)	DF	18 January 2001 (age 25)	Atlético Sanluqueño	2025	2026 (+1)	46	2
26	Elnur Mustafayev	(Azerbaijan)	DF	11 March 2006 (age 20)	Academy	2024		3	0
44	Salman Alasgarov	(Azerbaijan)	DF	9 June 2001 (age 25)	Shamakhi	2024	2026	9	2
66	Nuqay Rashidov	(Azerbaijan)	DF	20 January 2004 (age 22)	Unattached	2023		63	3
74	Suleyman Damadayev	(Azerbaijan)	DF	1 March 2003 (age 23)	Shamakhi	2024		45	0
81	Samir Ağayev	(Azerbaijan)	DF	17 May 2005 (age 21)	Zira	2026		0	0
Midfielders
4	Elvin Camalov	(Azerbaijan)	MF	4 February 1995 (age 31)	Unattached	2026	2028	148	0
6	Jaime Sierra	(Spain)	MF	18 March 1998 (age 28)	NK Varaždin	2025	2027	45	0
8	Endri Çekiçi	(Albania)	MF	23 November 1996 (age 29)	Unattached	2026	2027	5	1
10	Shahin Shahniyarov	(Azerbaijan)	MF	1 January 2005 (age 21)	Academy	2023		85	4
11	Asif Mammadov	(Azerbaijan)	MF	5 August 1986 (age 40)	Inter Baku	2015		264	17
17	Qadir Ramazanov	(Azerbaijan)	MF	25 April 2006 (age 20)	Academy	2025		1	0
19	Khayyam Mammadli	(Azerbaijan)	MF	23 February 2005 (age 21)	Baku Sporting	2026		0	0
22	Farid Isgandarov	(Azerbaijan)	MF	16 March 2001 (age 25)	Neftçi	2023		48	2
27	Eshqin Ahmadov	(Azerbaijan)	MF	6 November 2005 (age 21)	Academy	2023		57	2
Forwards
7	Bruno Silva	(Portugal)	FW	5 February 1998 (age 28)	Oliveirense	2026	2027(+1)	12	1
9	Karim Rossi	(Switzerland)	FW	1 May 1994 (age 32)	Unattached	2026	2028	9	1
21	Ziya Shakarkhanov	(Azerbaijan)	FW	26 July 2007 (age 19)	Academy	2024		20	1
23	Raphael Utzig	(Brazil)	FW	8 August 1996 (age 30)	Unattached	2026	2027	100	18
24	Ismahil Akinade	(Nigeria)	FW	11 February 1994 (age 32)	Andijon	2026	2027	30	7
80	Meshack Ubochioma	(Nigeria)	FW	29 November 2001 (age 24)	Kazincbarcikai	2026	2027(+1)	12	0
Out on loan
70	Paulo Guimbila	(Angola)	FW	9 October 2005 (age 21)	Al Ahli	2025	2028	15	0
Left during the season
3	Eduardo Kunde	(Brazil)	DF	17 September 1997 (age 29)	Unattached	2025	2026(+1)	27	0
6	Emil Süleymanov	(Azerbaijan)	MF	15 March 2004 (age 22)	Academy	2023		27	0
11	Asif Mammadov	(Azerbaijan)	MF	5 August 1986 (age 40)	Inter Baku	2015		263	17
30	Prince Owusu	(Ghana)	FW	27 January 2006 (age 20)	Nayan Academy	2025	2028	34	7
33	Seydina Keita	(Senegal)	DF	28 December 1992 (age 33)	Panevėžys	2026	2027	20	4
71	Senan Ağalarov	(Azerbaijan)	FW	12 May 2005 (age 21)	Academy	2023		1	0

== Transfers ==
=== In ===
Date	Position	Nationality	Name	From	Fee	Ref.
29 June 2026	DF	(Ivory Coast)	Kouya Mabea	Floriana	Undisclosed	
30 June 2026	DF	(Democratic Republic of the Congo)	Nathan Monzango	Bravo	Undisclosed	
9 July 2026	FW	(Switzerland)	Karim Rossi	Unattached	Free	
21 July 2026	FW	(Nigeria)	Meshack Ubochioma	Kazincbarcikai	Undisclosed	
28 July 2026	FW	(Portugal)	Bruno Silva	Oliveirense	Undisclosed	
10 August 2026	DF	(Brazil)	Edson Eduardo	Vestri	End of Season	
13 August 2026	DF	(Azerbaijan)	Samir Ağayev	Zira	Undisclosed	
24 August 2026	MF	(Azerbaijan)	Khayyam Mammadli	Baku Sporting	Undisclosed	
16 September 2026	MF	(Azerbaijan)	Elvin Camalov	Unattached	Free	
25 September 2026	FW	(Brazil)	Raphael Utzig	Unattached	Free	
3 October 2026	MF	(Albania)	Endri Çekiçi	Unattached	Free	

=== Loans in ===
Date from	Position	Nationality	Name	From	Date to	Ref.
1 August 2026	GK	(Brazil)	Arthur Motta	Beroe	End of Season	

=== Out ===
Date	Position	Nationality	Name	To	Fee	Ref.
1 July 2026	MF	(Nigeria)	Salihu Nasiru	Kano Pillars	Undisclosed	
9 July 2026	MF	(Azerbaijan)	Emil Süleymanov	Şamaxı	Undisclosed	
18 July 2026	FW	(Azerbaijan)	Senan Ağalarov	Sabail	Undisclosed	
27 July 2026	FW	(Ghana)	Prince Owusu	DAC 1904	Undisclosed	

=== Loans out ===
Date from	Position	Nationality	Name	To	Date to	Ref.
16 September 2026	FW	(Angola)	Paulo Guimbila	Gancabasar	30 June 2027	

=== Released ===
Date	Position	Nationality	Name	Joined	Date	Ref
6 July 2026	DF	(Senegal)	Seydina Keita	Panevėžys	9 July 2026	
7 July 2026	DF	(Brazil)	Eduardo Kunde	Olympiakos Nicosia	13 July 2026	

== Friendlies ==
14 July 2026	Gabala	2–1	Kapaz	Qabala
18:00 AZT (UTC+4)	Guimbila; Rashidov	Report	Goal	Stadium: City Stadium

19 July 2026	Sumgayit	1–1	Gabala	Sumgait
18:00 AZT (UTC+4)	Goal	Report	Akinade	Stadium: City Stadium

25 July 2026	Gabala	1–1	Shafa Baku	Qabala
18:30 AZT (UTC+4)	Amoah	Report	Goal	Stadium: City Stadium

31 July 2026	Gabala	2–2	İmişli	Qabala
18:00 AZT (UTC+4)	Rossi (o.g.)	Report	Goal	Stadium: City Stadium

2 August 2026	Gabala	2–1	Al Kharaitiyat	Qabala
18:00 AZT (UTC+4)	Rashidov; Hunpe	Report	Goal	Stadium: City Stadium

4 August 2026	Gabala	1–2	Şamaxı	Qabala
18:00 AZT (UTC+4)	Ubochioma	Report	Goal	Stadium: City Stadium

27 September 2026	Gabala	0–0	Karvan	Qabala
16:30 AZT (UTC+4)		Report		Stadium: City Stadium

3 October 2026	Gabala	1–3	Japan U20	Qabala
AZT (UTC+4)	Mammadli	Report		Stadium: City Stadium

== Competitions ==
=== Overview ===
Competition	First match	Last match	Starting round	Record							
Competition	First match	Last match	Starting round	Pld	W	D	L	GF	GA	GD	Win %
Premier League	14 August 2026		Matchday 1	11	2	2	7	6	18	−12	18.18
Azerbaijan Cup	27 October 2026		Second Round	1	1	0	0	3	0	+3	100.00
Total				12	3	2	7	9	18	−9	25.00

Last updated: 7 November 2026
Source: Competitions

=== Premier League ===
==== Table ====
Pos	Team	Pld	W	D	L	GF	GA	GD	Pts	Qualification or relegation
8	Imishli	11	3	2	6	9	15	−6	11	
9	Sumgayit	10	2	4	4	13	14	−1	10	
10	Qabala	11	2	2	7	6	18	−12	8	
11	Shafa	11	1	2	8	8	20	−12	5	Qualification to Relegation Play-off
12	Araz-Nax	11	0	4	7	11	23	−12	4	Relegation to Azerbaijan First Division

Updated to match(es) played on 8 November 2026. Source: Soccerway
Rules for classification: 1) Points; 2) Matches won; 3) Goal difference; 4) Goals scored; 5) Head-to-head points; 6) Head-to-head goal difference; 7) Lower number of points based on yellow and red cards; 8) Draw.

==== Results summary ====
Overall								Home						Away					
Pld	W	D	L	GF	GA	GD	Pts	W	D	L	GF	GA	GD	W	D	L	GF	GA	GD
11	2	2	7	6	18	−12	8	1	2	3	2	9	−7	1	0	4	4	9	−5

Last updated: 7 November 2026.
Source: See Results

==== Results by round ====
Round	1	2	3	4	5	6	7	8	9	10	11
Ground	A	H	H	H	A	H	A	H	A	H	A
Result	L	L	D	W	L	L	L	L	W	D	L
Position	8	11	10	7	8	9	10	10	10	10	10

Updated to match(es) played on 7 November 2026. Source: See Results
A = Away; H = Home; W = Win; D = Draw; L = Loss; P = Postponed

==== Results ====
14 August 2026 1	Turan Tovuz	1–0	Gabala	Tovuz
19:30 AZT (UTC+4)	Henrique (yellow card) 13' (goal) 35'; Hurtado (yellow card) 66'; Damjanović (yellow card) 84'	Report		Stadium: City Stadium; Attendance: 4,800; Referee: Tural Qurbanov

22 August 2026 2	Gabala	0–1	Shafa Baku	Qabala
18:30 AZT (UTC+4)	Ahmadov (yellow card) 81'	Report	Mamengi (yellow card) 11'; Yusifli (yellow card) 28'; Jarjué (yellow card) 66'; Guel 69'	Stadium: City Stadium; Attendance: 500; Referee: İnqilab Məmmədov

29 August 2026 3	Gabala	0–0	Şamaxı	Qabala
18:00 AZT (UTC+4)	Amoah (yellow card) 22'	Report	Apolinário (yellow card) 56'; Rüstəmov (yellow card) 70'	Stadium: City Stadium; Attendance: 900; Referee: Nicat İsmayıllı

4 September 2026 4	Gabala	2–1	İmişli	Qabala
18:00 AZT (UTC+4)	Mabea 15'; Shahniyarov (yellow card) 27'; Sierra (yellow card) 61'; Rossi 66' (yellow card) 66'	Report	Almeida (penalty missed) 25' 45+1'; Moses (yellow card) 69'; Ingilabli (yellow card) 69'; Salahlı (yellow card) 87'	Stadium: City Stadium; Attendance: 1,000; Referee: Rauf Cabarov

12 September 2026 5	Kapaz	1–0	Gabala	Ganja
17:30 AZT (UTC+4)	Stînă 64'; Benito (yellow card) 87'	Report	Rossi (yellow card) 71'; Monzango (yellow card) 81'	Stadium: City Stadium; Attendance: 11,000; Referee: Tural Qurbanov

18 September 2026 6	Gabala	0–3	Neftçi	Qabala
17:30 AZT (UTC+4)		Report	Almeida 25'; Ševelj (yellow card) 54'; Skribek (yellow card) 65'; Abbasov (yellow card) 77'; Akinyemi 86'; Tupta 90+2'	Stadium: City Stadium; Attendance: 800; Referee: Cavid Cəlilov

10 October 2026 7	Sumgayit	4–1	Gabala	Sumgait
19:30 AZT (UTC+4)	Bangré 6'; Suliman 9'; Santana (yellow card) 13'; Vásquez 29'; Badolo (yellow card) 62'; Black (yellow card) 63' (goal) 68'	Report	Shahniyarov 25' (yellow card) 83'; Akinade (yellow card) 28'	Stadium: City Stadium; Attendance: 1,000; Referee: Kamranbəy Rəhimov

17 October 2026 8	Gabala	0–4	Sabah	Qabala
16:00 AZT (UTC+4)		Report	Khaybulayev 45+1'; Isayev 74', 90+3'; Mickels 88'	Stadium: City Stadium; Attendance: 750; Referee: Əliyar Ağayev

23 October 2026 9	Araz-Naxçıvan	1–2	Gabala	Shamakhi
15:00 AZT (UTC+4)	Mara 36' (yellow card) 47'; Kané (yellow card) 90+2'; Rzayev (yellow card) 90+2'; Fernández (yellow card) 90+5'	Report	Akinade 6'; Eduardo (yellow card) 35'; Amoah 48'; Sierra (yellow card) 87'; Camalov (yellow card) 90+4'; Ubochioma (yellow card) 90+4'	Stadium: City Stadium; Attendance: 300; Referee: Əkbər Əhmədov

31 October 2026 10	Gabala	0–0	Qarabağ	Qabala
17:30 AZT (UTC+4)	Amoah (yellow card) 14'; Eduardo (yellow card) 45'	Report	Rosa (yellow card) 68'	Stadium: City Stadium; Attendance: 1,500; Referee: Rəvan Həmzəzadə

7 November 2026 11	Zira	2–1	Gabala	Zirə
18:30 AZT (UTC+4)	Volkovi 11'; Əlicanov (yellow card) 45+1'; Digbeu 89'	Report	Akinade 14' (yellow card) 23'	Stadium: Zira Olympic Sport Complex Stadium; Attendance: 550; Referee: İnqilab Məmmədov

21 November 2026 12	Shafa Baku	–	Gabala	Sumgait
17:00 AZT (UTC+4)		Report		Stadium: Kapital Bank Arena

=== Azerbaijan Cup ===
27 October 2026 Second Round	Gabala	3–0	Mingachevir	Qabala
17:00 AZT (UTC+4)	Shakarkhanov 38'; Çekiçi 41'; Silva 42'; Damadayev (yellow card) 52'	Report	Nuruyev (yellow card) 45'; Mürsəlov (yellow card) 75'	Stadium: City Stadium; Attendance: 150; Referee: Nazim Abdullayev

2027 Last 16	Gabala	–	Shahdag Qusar	Qabala
AZT (UTC+4)				Stadium: City Stadium

== Squad statistics ==
As of match played 7 November 2026

=== Appearances and goals ===
No.	Pos	Nat	Player	Total		Premier League		Azerbaijan Cup	
No.	Pos	Nat	Player	Apps	Goals	Apps	Goals	Apps	Goals
1	GK	(Azerbaijan) AZE	Səlahət Ağayev	11	0	11	0	0	0
3	DF	(Brazil) BRA	Edson Eduardo	11	0	9+1	0	0+1	0
4	MF	(Azerbaijan) AZE	Elvin Camalov	7	0	6	0	1	0
5	DF	(Democratic Republic of the Congo) COD	Nathan Monzango	11	0	7+3	0	1	0
6	MF	(Spain) ESP	Jaime Sierra	10	0	10	0	0	0
7	FW	(Portugal) POR	Bruno Silva	12	1	4+7	0	1	1
8	MF	(Albania) ALB	Endri Çekiçi	5	1	1+3	0	1	1
9	FW	(Switzerland) SUI	Karim Rossi	9	1	6+2	1	1	0
10	MF	(Azerbaijan) AZE	Shahin Shahniyarov	12	1	9+2	1	0+1	0
11	MF	(Azerbaijan) AZE	Asif Mammadov	1	0	0+1	0	0	0
12	DF	(Ivory Coast) CIV	Kouya Mabea	10	1	10	1	0	0
13	DF	(Azerbaijan) AZE	Nicat Aliyev	8	0	2+5	0	0+1	0
16	DF	(Ghana) GHA	Isaac Amoah	12	1	11	1	1	0
21	FW	(Azerbaijan) AZE	Ziya Shakarkhanov	8	1	0+7	0	1	1
22	MF	(Azerbaijan) AZE	Farid Isgandarov	4	0	1+2	0	1	0
23	FW	(Brazil) BRA	Raphael Utzig	6	0	4+1	0	0+1	0
24	FW	(Nigeria) NGR	Ismahil Akinade	11	2	10+1	2	0	0
27	MF	(Azerbaijan) AZE	Eshqin Ahmadov	11	0	9+2	0	0	0
66	DF	(Azerbaijan) AZE	Nuqay Rashidov	6	0	1+4	0	0+1	0
74	DF	(Azerbaijan) AZE	Suleyman Damadayev	1	0	0	0	0+1	0
80	FW	(Nigeria) NGR	Meshack Ubochioma	12	0	10+1	0	0+1	0
94	GK	(Azerbaijan) AZE	Habib Hushanov	1	0	0	0	1	0
Players away on loan:
Players who left Gabala during the season:

=== Goal scorers ===
Place	Position	Nation	Number	Name	Premier League	Azerbaijan Cup	Total
1	FW	(Nigeria)	24	Ismahil Akinade	2	0	2
2	FW	(Ivory Coast)	12	Kouya Mabea	1	0	1
2	FW	(Switzerland)	9	Karim Rossi	1	0	1
2	MF	(Azerbaijan)	10	Shahin Shahniyarov	1	0	1
2	DF	(Ghana)	16	Isaac Amoah	1	0	1
2	FW	(Azerbaijan)	21	Ziya Shakarkhanov	0	1	1
2	MF	(Albania)	8	Endri Çekiçi	0	1	1
2	FW	(Portugal)	7	Bruno Silva	0	1	1
				TOTALS	6	3	9

=== Clean sheets ===
Place	Position	Nation	Number	Name	Premier League	Azerbaijan Cup	Total
1	GK	(Azerbaijan)	1	Səlahət Ağayev	2	0	2
2	GK	(Azerbaijan)	94	Habib Hushanov	0	1	1
				TOTALS	2	1	3

=== Disciplinary record ===
Number	Nation	Position	Name	Premier League		Azerbaijan Cup		Total	
Number	Nation	Position	Name	Yellow card	Red card	Yellow card	Red card	Yellow card	Red card
3	(Brazil)	DF	Edson Eduardo	2	0	0	0	2	0
4	(Azerbaijan)	MF	Elvin Camalov	1	0	0	0	1	0
5	(Democratic Republic of the Congo)	DF	Nathan Monzango	1	0	0	0	1	0
6	(Spain)	MF	Jaime Sierra	2	0	0	0	2	0
9	(Switzerland)	FW	Karim Rossi	2	0	0	0	2	0
10	(Azerbaijan)	MF	Shahin Shahniyarov	2	0	0	0	2	0
16	(Ghana)	DF	Isaac Amoah	2	0	0	0	2	0
24	(Nigeria)	FW	Ismahil Akinade	2	0	0	0	2	0
27	(Azerbaijan)	MF	Eshqin Ahmadov	1	0	0	0	1	0
74	(Azerbaijan)	DF	Suleyman Damadayev	0	0	1	0	1	0
80	(Nigeria)	FW	Meshack Ubochioma	1	0	0	0	1	0
Players away on loan:
Players who left Gabala during the season:
			TOTALS	16	0	1	0	17	0
