= 2025–26 Gabala FK season =

Gabala
2025–26 season
- President: Fariz Najafov
- Manager: Kakhaber Tskhadadze
- Stadium: City Stadium
- Premier League: 11th
- Relegation Play-off: Winners
- Azerbaijan Cup: Quarter-final vs Sabah
- Top goalscorer: League: Domi Massoumou (9); All: Domi Massoumou (10)
- Highest home attendance: 2,000 (vs Qarabağ, 9 May 2026)
- Lowest home attendance: 150 (vs Kapaz, 20 September 2025)
- Average home league attendance: 604

The 2025–26 season was Gabala FK's 21st season, and their 1st season back in the Azerbaijan Premier League, after being relegated to the Azerbaijan First Division at the end of the 2023–24 season.

== Season overview ==
On 3 July, Gabala announced that Ghanaian left winger Prince Owusu had been promoted from Gabala's U19 team, signing a three-year contract.

On 4 July, Gabala announced the signing of Isaac Amoah from Atlético Sanluqueño, to a one-year contract with the option of a second.

On 5 July, Gabala announced the signing of Paulo Guimbila from Al Ahli, to a three-year contract.

On 12 July, Gabala announced the signing of Adriel Ba Loua from Caen, to a one-year contract.

On 30 July, Gabala announced that Urfan Ismayilov had left the club after his contract was ended by mutual agreement.

On 4 August, Gabala announced the signing of Eduardo Kunde, who'd most recently played for Persis Solo, to a one-year contract with the option of an additional year. Later the same day, Gabala announced the signing of Ibrahim Sangaré from Hapoel Hadera, to a one-year contract.

On 5 August, Gabala announced that Abdullahi Shuaibu had left the club after the optional year on his contract was not taken up by the club.

On 10 August, Gabala announced the signing of Jaime Sierra from NK Varaždin, to a two-year contract.

On 11 August, Gabala announced the signing of Salihu Nasiru from El-Kanemi Warriors, to a three-year contract.

On 12 August, Gabala announced that they had signed a one-year agreement with AFB Bank for them to be the clubs front of shirt sponsor.

On 10 September, Gabala announced the signing of Jeando Fuchs to a one-year contract after he'd left Bnei Sakhni, and the year-long loan signing of Rufat Ahmadov from Turan Tovuz.

On 5 January, Gabala announced the signing of Seydina Keita from Panevėžys, to a six-month contract, with the option of an additional year.

On 7 January, Gabala announced the signing of Ismahil Akinade from Andijon on a contract until the summer of 2027.

On 9 January, Gabala announced that they had parted ways with Elshad Taghiyev after his contract was terminated by mutual consent.

On 27 January, Gabala announced the departure from the club of Jeando Fuchs by mutual consent, and that they had signed Rza Jafarov on loan from Neftçi for the remainder of the season.

On 29 January, Gabala announced the loan signing of Turan Manafov from Stellenbosch, until the end of the season.

On 11 February, Gabala announced the loan signing of Sambou Sissoko from Valenciennes, until the end of the season.

On 14 April, Gabala announced that Prince Owusu had extended his contract with the club until the 30 June 2028.

On 1 June, Gabala announced that Rufat Ahmadov and Ibrahim Sangaré had left the club after their contracts had expired, whilst Turan Manafov had returned to Stellenbosch after his loan deal had expired.

== Squad ==
As of match played 28 May 2026

No.	Name	Nationality	Position	Date of birth (age)	Signed from	Signed in	Contract ends	Apps.	Goals
Goalkeepers
1	Səlahət Ağayev	(Azerbaijan)	GK	4 January 1991 (aged 35)	Sabail	2024		88	0
93	Rza Jafarov	(Azerbaijan)	GK	3 July 2003 (aged 22)	on loan from Neftçi	2026	2026	9	0
94	Habib Hushanov	(Azerbaijan)	GK	16 October 2007 (aged 18)	Academy	2023		4	0
Defenders
3	Eduardo Kunde	(Brazil)	DF	17 September 1997 (aged 28)	Unattached	2025	2026(+1)	27	0
7	Turan Manafov	(Azerbaijan)	DF	19 August 1998 (aged 27)	on loan from Stellenbosch	2026	2026	10	0
8	Sambou Sissoko	(France)	DF	27 April 1999 (aged 27)	on loan from Valenciennes	2026	2026	8	0
13	Nicat Aliyev	(Azerbaijan)	DF	24 September 2001 (aged 24)	Sumgayit	2022		85	6
16	Isaac Amoah	(Ghana)	DF	18 January 2001 (aged 25)	Atlético Sanluqueño	2025	2026 (+1)	34	1
23	Rufat Ahmadov	(Azerbaijan)	DF	22 September 2002 (aged 23)	on loan from Turan Tovuz	2025	2026	34	0
26	Elnur Mustafayev	(Azerbaijan)	DF	11 March 2006 (aged 20)	Academy	2024		3	0
28	Murad Musayev	(Azerbaijan)	DF	13 June 1994 (aged 31)	Zira	2019		194	7
33	Seydina Keita	(Senegal)	DF	28 December 1992 (aged 33)	Panevėžys	2026	2026 (+1)	20	4
44	Salman Alasgarov	(Azerbaijan)	DF	9 June 2001 (aged 24)	Shamakhi	2024	2026	9	2
66	Nuqay Rashidov	(Azerbaijan)	DF	20 January 2004 (aged 22)	Unattached	2023		56	3
74	Suleyman Damadayev	(Azerbaijan)	DF	1 March 2003 (aged 23)	Shamakhi	2024		44	0
Midfielders
6	Jaime Sierra	(Spain)	MF	18 March 1998 (aged 28)	NK Varaždin	2025	2027	35	0
10	Shahin Shahniyarov	(Azerbaijan)	MF	1 January 2005 (aged 21)	Academy	2023		73	3
11	Asif Mammadov	(Azerbaijan)	MF	5 August 1986 (aged 39)	Inter Baku	2015		263	17
17	Qadir Ramazanov	(Azerbaijan)	MF	25 April 2006 (aged 20)	Academy	2025		1	0
21	Ziya Shakarkhanov	(Azerbaijan)	MF	26 July 2007 (aged 18)	Academy	2024		12	0
27	Eshqin Ahmadov	(Azerbaijan)	MF	6 November 2005 (aged 20)	Academy	2023		46	2
50	Adriel Ba Loua	(Ivory Coast)	MF	25 July 1996 (aged 29)	Caen	2025	2026	35	4
	Salihu Nasiru	(Nigeria)	MF	1 October 2006 (aged 19)	El-Kanemi Warriors	2025	2028	0	0
Forwards
12	Ibrahim Sangaré	(France)	FW	15 March 1994 (aged 32)	Hapoel Hadera	2025	2026	26	4
14	Domi Massoumou	(Republic of the Congo)	FW	4 June 2003 (aged 22)	CSMD Diables Noirs	2024	2026	67	28
22	Farid Isgandarov	(Azerbaijan)	FW	16 March 2001 (aged 25)	Neftçi	2023		44	2
24	Ismahil Akinade	(Nigeria)	FW	11 February 1994 (aged 32)	Andijon	2026	2027	19	5
30	Prince Owusu	(Ghana)	FW	27 January 2006 (aged 20)	Nayan Academy	2025	2028	34	7
70	Paulo Guimbila	(Angola)	FW	9 October 2005 (aged 20)	Al Ahli	2025	2028	15	0
Out on loan
6	Emil Süleymanov	(Azerbaijan)	MF	15 March 2004 (aged 22)	Academy	2023		27	0
23	Mehrac Bakhshali	(Azerbaijan)	FW	11 June 2003 (aged 22)	Academy	2022		22	1
71	Senan Ağalarov	(Azerbaijan)	FW	12 May 2005 (aged 21)	Academy	2023		1	0
Left during the season
8	Urfan Ismayilov	(Azerbaijan)	MF	17 May 1996 (aged 30)	Qaradağ Lökbatan	2024	2026	27	1
19	Abdullahi Shuaibu	(Nigeria)	FW	22 January 2002 (aged 24)	Unattached	2024	2025 (+1)	29	8
42	Jeando Fuchs	(Cameroon)	MF	11 October 1997 (aged 28)	Unattached	2025	2026	4	0
97	Elshad Taghiyev	(Azerbaijan)	FW	15 June 2001 (aged 24)	Shamakhi	2024	2025 (+1)	39	9

== Transfers ==
=== In ===
Date	Position	Nationality	Name	From	Fee	Ref.
3 July 2025	FW	(Ghana)	Prince Owusu	Gabala U19	Promoted	
4 July 2025	DF	(Ghana)	Isaac Amoah	Atlético Sanluqueño	Undisclosed	
5 July 2025	FW	(Angola)	Paulo Guimbila	Al Ahli	Undisclosed	
12 July 2025	MF	(Ivory Coast)	Adriel Ba Loua	Caen	Undisclosed	
4 August 2025	DF	(Brazil)	Eduardo Kunde	Unattached	Free	
4 August 2025	FW	(France)	Ibrahim Sangaré	Hapoel Hadera	Undisclosed	
10 August 2025	MF	(Spain)	Jaime Sierra	NK Varaždin	Undisclosed	
11 August 2025	MF	(Nigeria)	Salihu Nasiru	El-Kanemi Warriors	Undisclosed	
10 September 2025	MF	(Cameroon)	Jeando Fuchs	Unattached	Free	
5 January 2026	DF	(Senegal)	Seydina Keita	Panevėžys	Undisclosed	
7 January 2026	FW	(Nigeria)	Ismahil Akinade	Andijon	Undisclosed	

=== Loans in ===
Date from	Position	Nationality	Name	From	Date to	Ref.
10 September 2025	DF	(Azerbaijan)	Rufat Ahmadov	Turan Tovuz	End of season	
27 January 2026	GK	(Azerbaijan)	Rza Jafarov	Neftçi	End of season	
29 January 2026	DF	(Azerbaijan)	Turan Manafov	Stellenbosch	End of season	
11 February 2026	DF	(France)	Sambou Sissoko	Valenciennes	End of season	

=== Loans out ===
Date from	Position	Nationality	Name	To	Date to	Ref.
31 January 2025	FW	(Azerbaijan)	Mehrac Bakhshali	Mingəçevir	30 June 2026	
28 July 2025	FW	(Azerbaijan)	Senan Ağalarov	Baku Sporting	30 June 2026	

=== Released ===
Date	Position	Nationality	Name	Joined	Date	Ref
27 June 2025	DF	(Azerbaijan)	Elvin Yunuszade	Karvan	25 July 2025	
30 July 2025	MF	(Azerbaijan)	Urfan Ismayilov	Safa		
5 August 2025	FW	(Nigeria)	Abdullahi Shuaibu	Shamakhi		
9 January 2026	FW	(Azerbaijan)	Elshad Taghiyev	Baku Sporting		
27 January 2026	MF	(Cameroon)	Jeando Fuchs	Charlotte Independence	30 April 2026	
1 June 2026	DF	(Azerbaijan)	Rufat Ahmadov	Turan Tovuz		
1 June 2026	FW	(France)	Ibrahim Sangaré			
4 June 2026	DF	(Azerbaijan)	Murad Musayev	Shafa Baku	12 June 2026	
10 June 2026	FW	(Ivory Coast)	Adriel Ba Loua	Gwangju	3 July 2026	
30 June 2026	FW	(Azerbaijan)	Mehrac Bakhshali	Shahdag Qusar	1 July 2026	
30 June 2026	FW	(Republic of the Congo)	Domi Massoumou	Alashkert	1 July 2026	

== Friendlies ==
14 July 2025	Gabala	2–1	Shamakhi	Qabala
18:00 AZT (UTC+4)	Shakarkhanov; Alasgarov	Report	Goal	Stadium: City Stadium

21 July 2025	Gabala	2–0	Kapaz	Qabala
18:00 AZT (UTC+4)	Guimbila 72'; Massoumou 82'	Report		Stadium: City Stadium

27 July 2025	Gabala	1–0	Sumgayit	Qabala
18:00 AZT (UTC+4)	Massoumou 70'	Report		Stadium: City Stadium

7 August 2025	Gabala	2–2	Sumgayit	Qabala
18:00 AZT (UTC+4)	Musayev; Sangaré	Report	Goal	Stadium: City Stadium

21 August 2025	Gabala	3–0	MOIK Baku	Qabala
AZT (UTC+4)	Amoah; Massoumou; Taghiyev	Report		Stadium: City Stadium

10 January 2026	Gabala	3–1	Kapaz	Qabala
14:00 AZT (UTC+4)	Massoumou 25'; Akinade 31'; Ramazanov 80'	Report	Goal	Stadium: City Stadium

14 January 2026	Araz-Naxçıvan	0–1	Gabala	Baku
15:00 AZT (UTC+4)		Report	Owusu 38'	Stadium: Baku Olympic Stadium

18 January 2026	Baku Sporting	1–7	Gabala	Baku
14:00 AZT (UTC+4)	Goal	Report	Akinade 4', 8'; Musayev 27'; E.Ahmadov 40'; Aliyev 60'; Sierra 66'; Nasiru 73'	Stadium: Baku Olympic Stadium

== Competitions ==
=== Overview ===
Competition	First match	Last match	Starting round	Final position	Record							
Competition	First match	Last match	Starting round	Final position	Pld	W	D	L	GF	GA	GD	Win %
Premier League	15 August 2025	23 May 2026	Matchday 1	11th	33	7	6	20	32	49	−17	21.21
Relegation Play-off	28 May 2026	28 May 2026	Final	Winners	1	1	0	0	2	0	+2	100.00
Azerbaijan Cup	29 October 2025	5 March 2026	Second Round	Quarter-final	4	2	2	0	10	5	+5	50.00
Total					38	10	8	20	44	54	−10	26.32

Last updated: 28 May 2026
Source: Competitions

=== Premier League ===
==== Table ====
Pos	Team	Pld	W	D	L	GF	GA	GD	Pts	Qualification or relegation
8	Shamakhi	33	9	11	13	31	40	−9	38	
9	Imishli	33	7	13	13	23	43	−20	34	
10	Kapaz	33	8	3	22	25	61	−36	27 (Note: Matches won: Kapaz 8, Gabala 7.)	
11	Gabala (O)	33	7	6	20	32	49	−17	27	Qualification to Relegation Play-off
12	Karvan (R)	33	3	6	24	23	66	−43	15	Relegation to Azerbaijan First Division

Source: Soccerway
Rules for classification: 1) Points; 2) Matches won; 3) Goal difference; 4) Goals scored; 5) Head-to-head points; 6) Head-to-head goal difference; 7) Lower number of points based on yellow and red cards; 8) Draw.
(O) Play-off winners; (R) Relegated

==== Results summary ====
Overall								Home						Away					
Pld	W	D	L	GF	GA	GD	Pts	W	D	L	GF	GA	GD	W	D	L	GF	GA	GD
33	7	6	20	32	49	−17	27	4	3	9	17	24	−7	3	3	11	15	25	−10

Last updated: 21 May 2026.
Source: See Results

==== Results by round ====
Round	1	2	3	4	5	6	7	8	9	10	11	12	13	15	16	17	18	19	20	21	14	22	23	24	25	26	27	28	29	30	31	32	33
Ground	A	H	A	A	H	A	H	A	H	A	H	A	H	A	H	A	H	A	H	A	H	H	A	H	A	A	H	A	H	A	H	A	H
Result	D	L	L	L	W	L	L	D	L	L	L	L	W	L	L	W	W	L	L	D	L	D	L	L	L	W	L	L	D	L	D	W	W
Position	4	8	11	11	10	11	11	10	10	10	11	10	10	11	11	11	10	10	10	10	10	10	11	11	11	11	11	11	11	11	11	11	11

Updated to match(es) played on 21 May 2026. Source: See Results
A = Away; H = Home; W = Win; D = Draw; L = Loss; P = Postponed

==== Results ====
15 August 2025 1	Karvan	1–1	Gabala	Shamakhi
17:00 AZT (UTC+4)	Musayev 78' (o.g.)	Report	Owusu (yellow card) 40'; Massoumou 54'; Amoah (yellow card) 74'; Sangaré (yellow card) 77'	Stadium: City Stadium; Attendance: 1,500; Referee: Aliyar Aghayev

25 August 2025 2	Gabala	1–2	Zira	Qabala
19:00 AZT (UTC+4)	Aliyev 17'; Shahniyarov (yellow card) 46'; Rashidov (yellow card) 90+2'; Sierra (yellow card) 90+5'	Report	Renato (yellow card) 22'; Nuriyev 32', 45+1'; Papunashvili (yellow card) 70'; Gomis (yellow card) 90+5'	Stadium: City Stadium; Attendance: 1,000; Referee: İnqilab Məmmədov

30 August 2025 3	Araz-Naxçıvan	2–1	Gabala	Baku
20:30 AZT (UTC+4)	Simakala 30'; Santos 33'; Andrade (yellow card) 45'	Report	Rashidov (yellow card) 4'; Ba Loua 9'; Sangaré (yellow card) 12'; Damadayev (yellow card) 21'	Stadium: Dalga Arena; Attendance: 100; Referee: Elçin Məsiyev

13 September 2025 4	Turan Tovuz	1–0	Gabala	Baku
19:00 AZT (UTC+4)	Souza 54'	Report	Kunde (yellow card) 64'	Stadium: Azersun Arena; Attendance: 1,200; Referee: Cavid Cəlilov

20 September 2025 5	Gabala	3–0	Kapaz	Qabala
17:00 AZT (UTC+4)	Kunde (yellow card) 28'; Ba Loua 44'; Owusu 59', 67' (yellow card) 82'	Report	Abilov (yellow card) 90+1'	Stadium: City Stadium; Attendance: 150; Referee: Kamal Umudlu

26 September 2025 6	Qarabağ	2–0	Gabala	Baku
19:00 AZT (UTC+4)	Zoubir 16'; Silva (yellow card) 43'; Qurbanlı 90+3'	Report	Owusu (red card) 1'; Massoumou (yellow card) 42'	Stadium: Azersun Arena; Attendance: 860; Referee: Rauf Cabarov

5 October 2025 7	Gabala	0–1	Şamaxı	Qabala
17:30 AZT (UTC+4)	Aliyev (yellow card) 32'; Musayev (yellow card) 90+3'; Amoah (yellow card) 90+3'	Report	Apolinario 8' (pen.); Balau (yellow card) 11'; Mammadov (yellow card) 74'; Agjabayov (yellow card) 90+1'; Rossi (yellow card) 90+1'	Stadium: City Stadium; Attendance: 400; Referee: Elçin Məsiyev

18 October 2025 8	İmişli	2–2	Gabala	Baku
14:30 AZT (UTC+4)	Ronaldo (yellow card) 14' (goal) 74'; Almeida 80'	Report	Musayev (yellow card) 31'; Massoumou 44'; Sangaré 47'; Kunde (yellow card) 61'; Aliyev (yellow card) 73'; Ağayev (yellow card) 86'	Stadium: Lökbatan Olympic Sport Complex Stadium; Attendance: 100; Referee: İnqilab Məmmədov

26 October 2025 9	Gabala	0–2	Neftçi	Qabala
16:00 AZT (UTC+4)		Report	Kuč (yellow card) 40'; Camalov (yellow card) 42'; Mathew 72'; Aboubakar 81'	Stadium: City Stadium; Attendance: 600; Referee: Aliyar Aghayev

3 November 2025 10	Sabah	1–0	Gabala	Masazir
19:30 AZT (UTC+4)	Seydiyev (yellow card) 19'; Solvet 28'; Rakhmonaliev (yellow card) 73'	Report	Mammadov (yellow card) HT	Stadium: Bank Respublika Arena; Attendance: 600; Referee: Fərid Hacıyev

7 November 2025 11	Gabala	0–2	Sumgayit	Qabala
16:44 AZT (UTC+4)	Ba Loua (yellow card) 6'; Sierra (yellow card) 65'	Report	Moumini (yellow card) 9'; Vásquez (yellow card) 13'; Ramalingom (penalty missed) 55' 82'; Akhmedzade 55'; Ninković (yellow card) 65'; Pinto (yellow card) 85'	Stadium: City Stadium; Attendance: 300; Referee: Rəşad Əhmədov

22 November 2025 12	Zira	1–0	Gabala	Zirə
17:30 AZT (UTC+4)	Júnior (yellow card) 42'; Renato 45+3' (pen.); Alıyev (yellow card) 53'; Acka (yellow card) 69'	Report	Mammadov (yellow card) 18'; Sangaré (penalty missed) 29'; Ba Loua (yellow card) 63'; Amoah (yellow card) 72'	Stadium: Zira Olympic Sport Complex Stadium; Attendance: 800; Referee: Elvin Bayramov

30 November 2025 13	Gabala	2–1	Araz-Naxçıvan	Qabala
16:30 AZT (UTC+4)	Owusu 15'; Musayev (yellow card) 39' (yellow-red card) 90+4'; Ba Loua 59'; Ağayev (yellow card) 78'	Report	Hasanalizade (yellow card) 28' (goal) 34'; Andrade (yellow card) 57'; Simakala (yellow card) 73'	Stadium: City Stadium; Attendance: 700; Referee: Kamal Umudlu

14 December 2025 15	Kapaz	1–0	Gabala	Yevlakh
14:00 AZT (UTC+4)	Onanuga (yellow card) 34'; Ohori 54'; Pachu (yellow card) 56'; Seyidov (yellow card) 71'; Samadov (yellow card) 77'	Report	Sangaré (red card) 36'; Sierra (yellow card) 70'	Stadium: City Stadium; Attendance: 700; Referee: Rəvan Həmzəzadə

21 December 2025 16	Gabala	1–2	Qarabağ	Qabala
15:00 AZT (UTC+4)	Owusu 6'; Ba Loua (yellow card) 8'; Sierra (yellow card) 63'; Aliyev (yellow card) 65'	Report	Guseynov 27'; Janković 79' (yellow card) 90+4'; Daniel (yellow card) 86'	Stadium: City Stadium; Attendance: 850; Referee: Əli Əliyev

24 January 2026 17	Şamaxı	0–4	Gabala	Shamakhi
14:00 AZT (UTC+4)	Abbasov (yellow card) 88'	Report	Massoumou 45'; Amoah 47'; Akinade 81'; Isgandarov 90+4'	Stadium: City Stadium; Attendance: 900; Referee: Rəşad Əhmədov

30 January 2026 18	Gabala	3–2	İmişli	Qabala
17:00 AZT (UTC+4)	Massoumou 27', 45+1', 87'; Akinade (yellow card) 52'	Report	Almeida 7', 60'; Isayev (yellow card) 84'	Stadium: City Stadium; Attendance: 700; Referee: Kamranbəy Rəhimov

10 February 2026 19	Neftçi	1–0	Gabala	Baku
19:00 AZT (UTC+4)	Mahmudov 12'; Sambou (yellow card) 50'; Shtohrin (yellow card) 53'; Badalov (yellow card) 78' (yellow-red card) 90+1'; Pirić (yellow card) 83'	Report		Stadium: Neftçi Arena; Attendance: 1,000; Referee: Əliyar Ağayev

16 February 2026 20	Gabala	0–1	Sabah	Qabala
17:00 AZT (UTC+4)	Sissoko (yellow card) 82'	Report	Aliyev 54'; Sekidika (yellow card) 90+5'	Stadium: City Stadium; Attendance: 1,000; Referee: Rauf Cabarov

20 February 2026 21	Sumgayit	0–0	Gabala	Sumgait
19:30 AZT (UTC+4)	Dzhenetov (yellow card) 33'; Vásquez (yellow card) 39'	Report	Ba Loua (penalty missed) 34'; Sierra (yellow card) 90'	Stadium: City Stadium; Attendance: 1,000; Referee: Fərid Hacıyev

24 February 2026 14	Gabala	0–3	Turan Tovuz	Qabala
15:00 AZT (UTC+4)		Report	Serrano 9'; Ozobić 18'; Sadykhov (yellow card) 34'; Keita 47' (o.g.)	Stadium: City Stadium; Attendance: 300; Referee: Cavid Cəlilov
Note: Match was abandoned in the 24th minute of 8 December 2025, due to heavy fog.

28 February 2026 22	Gabala	1–1	Karvan	Qabala
17:00 AZT (UTC+4)	Keita 36' (pen.)	Report	Barker 26'; Mateus (yellow card) 35'; Thompson (yellow card) 45'; Rüstamov (yellow card) 45+1'	Stadium: City Stadium; Attendance: 150; Referee: Kamal Umudlu

10 March 2026 23	Sabah	7–1	Gabala	Masazir
19:15 AZT (UTC+4)	Mickels 11', 33'; Isayev 24'; Parris 40'; Malouda 53'; Sekidika 63'; Dashdamirov 77'	Report	Ba Loua 87'	Stadium: Bank Respublika Arena; Attendance: 500; Referee: İnqilab Məmmədov

15 March 2026 24	Gabala	1–3	Neftçi	Qabala
18:00 AZT (UTC+4)	Keita 20' (pen.); Rashidov (yellow card) 36'; Ahmadov (yellow card) 81'	Report	Badalov (yellow card) 16'; Sambou 22'; Mahmudov 69' (pen.); Mammadov 77'	Stadium: City Stadium; Attendance: 370; Referee: Elçin Məsiyev

21 March 2026 25	Turan Tovuz	3–2	Gabala	Sumgait
16:00 AZT (UTC+4)	Hurtado 3', 49'; Guseynov (yellow card) 22'; Jô 59'; Miller (yellow card) 90+6'	Report	Ahmadov 29'; Miller 90+6' (o.g.)	Stadium: City Stadium; Attendance: 250; Referee: Kamal Umudlu

5 April 2026 26	Kapaz	0–2	Gabala	Yevlakh
15:30 AZT (UTC+4)	Ba (yellow card) 52'; Verdasca (red card) 90+1'	Report	Akinade (yellow card) 47' (goal) 74'; Massoumou 90'	Stadium: City Stadium; Attendance: 500; Referee: Vüqar Həsənli

12 April 2026 27	Gabala	0–1	İmişli	Qabala
15:30 AZT (UTC+4)	Amoah (yellow card) 22'	Report	Rollo 45'; Cardoso (yellow card) 69'; Morgan (yellow card) 89'	Stadium: City Stadium; Attendance: 200; Referee: Rəşad Əhmədov

19 April 2026 28	Sumgayit	1–0	Gabala	Sumgait
18:00 AZT (UTC+4)	Haghverdi 19'; Akhmedzade (yellow card) 31'; Ninković (yellow card) 33'; Vásquez (yellow card) 65'	Report	Ba Loua (yellow card) 28'; Sierra (yellow card) 90+4'	Stadium: City Stadium; Attendance: 1,200; Referee: Vüqar Həsənli

25 April 2026 29	Gabala	1–1	Araz-Naxçıvan	Qabala
18:30 AZT (UTC+4)	Sierra (yellow card) 28'; Musayev (yellow card) 45'; Buludov 75' (o.g.)	Report	Avram (yellow card) 63'; Paro 82'	Stadium: City Stadium; Attendance: 250; Referee: Kamal Umudlu

3 May 2026 30	Zira	1–0	Gabala	Zirə
18:30 AZT (UTC+4)	Konaté (yellow card) 44'; Papunashvili (yellow card) 74'; Júnior 78'; Hacılı (yellow card) 81'	Report		Stadium: Zira Olympic Sport Complex Stadium; Attendance: 150; Referee: Elçin Məsiyev

9 May 2026 31	Gabala	1–1	Qarabağ	Qabala
17:00 AZT (UTC+4)	Akinade 57' (yellow card) 86'; Ahmadov (yellow card) 78'; Rashidov (yellow card) 82'; Mammadov (red card) 86'	Report	Kady 29'; Durán (yellow card) 50'; Bayramov (penalty missed) 78'	Stadium: City Stadium; Attendance: 2,000; Referee: İnqilab Məmmədov

15 May 2026 32	Karvan	1–2	Gabala	Yevlakh
17:00 AZT (UTC+4)	V.Abdullayev (yellow card) 45'; Doyeni (yellow card) 47' (goal) 54'	Report	Sangaré 56'; Massoumou 67'; Isgandarov (yellow card) 90+4'	Stadium: City Stadium; Attendance: 660; Referee: Əli Əliyev

21 May 2026 33	Gabala	3–1	Şamaxı	Qabala
17:00 AZT (UTC+4)	Keita 4'; Massoumou 33'; Aliyev 36'; Ahmadov (yellow card) 90+2'	Report	Agjabayov (yellow card) 11'; Mammadov (yellow card) 12'; Rossi 15'	Stadium: City Stadium; Attendance: 700; Referee: Kamranbəy Rəhimov

==== Relegation Play-off ====
28 May 2026	Gabala	2–0	Mingəçevir	Sumgait
18:30 AZT (UTC+4)	Eyubov 36' (o.g.); Keita 45+1' (pen.); Sangaré (yellow card) 75'; Akinade (yellow card) 89'	Report	Bayramov (yellow card) 45+1'; Mammadov (yellow card) 48'	Stadium: Kapital Bank Arena; Attendance: 1,200; Referee: Tural Qurbanov

=== Azerbaijan Cup ===
29 October 2025 Second round	Gabala	5–1	Mingəçevir	Qabala
16:00 AZT (UTC+4)	Massoumou 45'; Owusu 49', 54', 63'; Rashidov 66'; Sierra (yellow card) 67'; Amoah (yellow card) 90+2'	Report	Cəfərli (yellow card) 56'; Attuquaye 57'	Stadium: City Stadium; Attendance: 200; Referee: İslam Məmmədov

4 December 2025 Last 16	Gabala	2–1	Safa	Qabala
15:00 AZT (UTC+4)	Sangaré 2', 53'	Report	Zamanov 6'; Mürsəlov (yellow card) 90+2'	Stadium: City Stadium; Attendance: 500; Referee: Əli Əliyev

4 February 2026 Quarter-final 1st leg	Sabah	0–0	Gabala	Masazir
19:30 AZT (UTC+4)	Sekidika (yellow card) 45+2'	Report	Massoumou (penalty missed) 29	Stadium: Bank Respublika Arena; Attendance: 300; Referee: Fərid Hacıyev

5 March 2026 Quarter-final 2nd leg	Gabala	3–3 (a.e.t.) (3–3 agg.) (2–4 p)	Sabah	Qabala
18:00 AZT (UTC+4)	Ba Loua (red card) 48'; Aliyev (yellow card) 50'; Akinade 88', 90'; Rashidov 115', (yellow card) 116'	Report	Puchacz 31', 62'; Solvet (yellow card) 57'; Ygor Nogueira (yellow card) 61'; Mickels 104'	Stadium: City Stadium; Attendance: 300; Referee: Rəvan Həmzəzadə
	Penalties
	Sierra (penalty scored); Musayev (penalty missed); Massoumou (penalty scored); Isgandarov (penalty missed)		Mickels (penalty scored); Puchacz (penalty scored); Isayev (penalty scored); Parris (penalty scored)

== Squad statistics ==
As of match played 28 May 2026

=== Appearances and goals ===
No.	Pos	Nat	Player	Total		Premier League		Relegation Play-off		Azerbaijan Cup	
No.	Pos	Nat	Player	Apps	Goals	Apps	Goals	Apps	Goals	Apps	Goals
1	GK	(Azerbaijan) AZE	Səlahət Ağayev	28	0	25	0	1	0	2	0
3	DF	(Brazil) BRA	Eduardo Kunde	27	0	18+5	0	0	0	2+2	0
6	MF	(Spain) ESP	Jaime Sierra	35	0	30	0	1	0	4	0
7	DF	(Azerbaijan) AZE	Turan Manafov	10	0	4+4	0	0	0	1+1	0
8	DF	(France) FRA	Sambou Sissoko	8	0	6+2	0	0	0	0	0
10	MF	(Azerbaijan) AZE	Shahin Shahniyarov	36	0	24+7	0	1	0	3+1	0
12	FW	(France) FRA	Ibrahim Sangaré	26	4	9+15	2	0+1	0	1	2
13	DF	(Azerbaijan) AZE	Nicat Aliyev	35	2	22+9	2	1	0	3	0
14	FW	(Republic of the Congo) CGO	Domi Massoumou	38	10	30+3	9	1	0	3+1	1
16	DF	(Ghana) GHA	Isaac Amoah	34	1	28+1	1	1	0	4	0
17	MF	(Azerbaijan) AZE	Qadir Ramazanov	1	0	0+1	0	0	0	0	0
21	MF	(Azerbaijan) AZE	Ziya Shakarkhanov	6	0	0+4	0	0	0	0+2	0
22	FW	(Azerbaijan) AZE	Farid Isgandarov	26	1	0+21	1	0+1	0	0+4	0
23	DF	(Azerbaijan) AZE	Rufat Ahmadov	4	0	0+4	0	0	0	0	0
24	FW	(Nigeria) NGR	Ismahil Akinade	19	5	14+2	3	0+1	0	2	2
27	MF	(Azerbaijan) AZE	Eshqin Ahmadov	34	1	26+5	1	1	0	1+1	0
28	DF	(Azerbaijan) AZE	Murad Musayev	35	0	27+3	0	1	0	4	0
30	FW	(Ghana) GHA	Prince Owusu	35	7	23+7	4	1	0	4	3
33	DF	(Senegal) SEN	Seydina Keita	20	4	17	3	1	1	2	0
50	MF	(Ivory Coast) CIV	Adriel Ba Loua	35	4	26+4	4	1	0	2+2	0
66	DF	(Azerbaijan) AZE	Nuqay Rashidov	32	2	12+15	0	0+1	0	3+1	2
70	FW	(Angola) ANG	Paulo Guimbila	16	0	0+14	0	0	0	0+2	0
74	DF	(Azerbaijan) AZE	Suleyman Damadayev	17	0	11+3	0	0+1	0	0+2	0
93	GK	(Azerbaijan) AZE	Rza Jafarov	9	0	8	0	0	0	1	0
94	GK	(Azerbaijan) AZE	Habib Hushanov	1	0	0	0	0	0	1	0
Players away on loan:
Players who left Gabala during the season:
42	MF	(Cameroon) CMR	Jeando Fuchs	4	0	3	0	0	0	1	0
97	FW	(Azerbaijan) AZE	Elshad Taghiyev	11	0	0+9	0	0	0	0+2	0

=== Goal scorers ===
Place	Position	Nation	Number	Name	Premier League	Relegation Play-off	Azerbaijan Cup	Total
1	FW	(Republic of the Congo)	14	Domi Massoumou	9	0	1	10
2	FW	(Ghana)	30	Prince Owusu	4	0	3	7
3	FW	(Nigeria)	24	Ismahil Akinade	3	0	2	5
4	MF	(Ivory Coast)	50	Adriel Ba Loua	4	0	0	4
4	DF	(Senegal)	33	Seydina Keita	3	1	0	4
4	FW	(France)	12	Ibrahim Sangaré	2	0	2	4
7				Own goal	2	1	0	3
8	DF	(Azerbaijan)	13	Nicat Aliyev	2	0	0	2
8	DF	(Azerbaijan)	66	Nuqay Rashidov	0	0	2	2
10	DF	(Ghana)	16	Isaac Amoah	1	0	0	1
10	FW	(Azerbaijan)	22	Farid Isgandarov	1	0	0	1
10	MF	(Azerbaijan)	27	Eshqin Ahmadov	1	0	0	1
				TOTALS	32	2	10	42

=== Clean sheets ===
Place	Position	Nation	Number	Name	Premier League	Relegation Play-off	Azerbaijan Cup	Total
1	FW	(Azerbaijan)	1	Səlahət Ağayev	3	1	0	4
2	FW	(Azerbaijan)	93	Rza Jafarov	1	0	1	2
				TOTALS	4	1	1	6

=== Disciplinary record ===
Number	Nation	Position	Name	Premier League		Relegation Play-off		Azerbaijan Cup		Total	
Number	Nation	Position	Name	Booked	Sent off (straight red)	Booked	Sent off (straight red)	Booked	Sent off (straight red)	Booked	Sent off (straight red)
1	(Azerbaijan)	GK	Səlahət Ağayev	2	0	0	0	0	0	2	0
3	(Brazil)	DF	Eduardo Kunde	3	0	0	0	0	0	3	0
6	(Spain)	MF	Jaime Sierra	7	0	0	0	1	0	8	0
8	(France)	DF	Sambou Sissoko	1	0	0	0	0	0	1	0
10	(Azerbaijan)	MF	Shahin Shahniyarov	1	0	0	0	0	0	1	0
11	(Azerbaijan)	MF	Asif Mammadov	2	1	0	0	0	0	2	1
12	(France)	FW	Ibrahim Sangaré	2	1	1	0	0	0	3	1
13	(Azerbaijan)	DF	Nicat Aliyev	3	0	0	0	1	0	4	0
14	(Republic of the Congo)	FW	Domi Massoumou	1	0	0	0	0	0	1	0
16	(Ghana)	DF	Isaac Amoah	4	0	0	0	1	0	5	0
22	(Azerbaijan)	FW	Farid Isgandarov	1	0	0	0	0	0	1	0
24	(Nigeria)	FW	Ismahil Akinade	3	0	1	0	0	0	4	0
27	(Azerbaijan)	MF	Eshqin Ahmadov	3	0	0	0	0	0	3	0
28	(Azerbaijan)	DF	Murad Musayev	5	1	0	0	0	0	5	1
30	(Ghana)	FW	Prince Owusu	2	1	0	0	0	0	2	1
50	(Ivory Coast)	MF	Adriel Ba Loua	4	0	0	0	0	1	4	1
66	(Azerbaijan)	DF	Nuqay Rashidov	4	0	0	0	1	0	5	0
74	(Azerbaijan)	DF	Suleyman Damadayev	1	0	0	0	0	0	1	0
Players away on loan:
Players who left Gabala during the season:
			TOTALS	49	4	2	0	4	1	55	5
