= Ibrahim Sangaré =

Ibrahim Sangaré may refer to:

- Ibrahim Sangaré (French footballer) (born 1994), French footballer
- Ibrahim Sangaré (Ivorian footballer) (born 1997), Ivorian footballer
