= Nathan Monzango =

French footballer (born 2001)

Personal information
- Date of birth: 18 April 2001 (age 25)
- Place of birth: Kinshasa, DR Congo
- Height: 1.84 m (6 ft 0 in)
- Position: Defender

Team information
- Current team: Qabala
- Number: 5

Senior career*
Years	Team	Apps	(Gls)
2018–2020	Amiens II	2	(0)
2020–2022	Amiens	21	(0)
2021–2022	→ Çaykur Rizespor (loan)	0	(0)
2022–2023	Pau	4	(0)
2022–2023	Pau II	14	(0)
2023–2024	Cholet	29	(2)
2024–2025	Villefranche	23	(0)
2025–2026	Bravo	22	(1)
2026–	Qabala	10	(0)
- * Club domestic league appearances and goals as of 13 November 2026

Nathan Monzango (born 18 April 2001) is a French professional footballer who plays as a defender for Azerbaijani club Qabala.

== Career ==
Monzango made his professional debut with Amiens in a 1–0 Ligue 2 win over Nancy on 22 August 2020.

On 8 September 2021, he joined Turkish club Çaykur Rizespor on loan. On 4 February 2022, Çaykur Rizespor terminated the loan after Monzango made only one cup appearance for the club up to that point.

Monzago joined Pau in Ligue 2 in 2022 for the next two seasons.

On 14 August 2024, Monzango signed for Championnat National club Villefranche.

On 30 June 2026, Azerbaijan Premier League club Qabala announced the signing of Monzango to a one-year contract, with the option of a second year.

== Birth ==
He was born in the Congo

== Career statistics ==
As of match played on 7 November 2026

Appearances and goals by club, season and competition
Club	Season	League			National cup		League cup		Continental		Other		Total	
Club	Season	Division	Apps	Goals	Apps	Goals	Apps	Goals	Apps	Goals	Apps	Goals	Apps	Goals
Pau	2022–23	Ligue 2	4	0	2	0	—		—		—		6	0
SO Cholet	2023–24	Championnat National	29	2	2	0	—		—		—		31	2
Villefranche Beaujolais	2024–25	Championnat National	23	0	2	0	—		—		—		25	0
Bravo	2025–26	Slovenian PrvaLiga	22	1	4	0	—		—		—		26	1
Qabala	2026–27	Azerbaijan Premier League	10	0	1	0	—		—		—		11	0
Career total			88	3	11	0	-	-	-	-	-	-	98	3
