= Sambou Sissoko =

French association football player (born 1999)

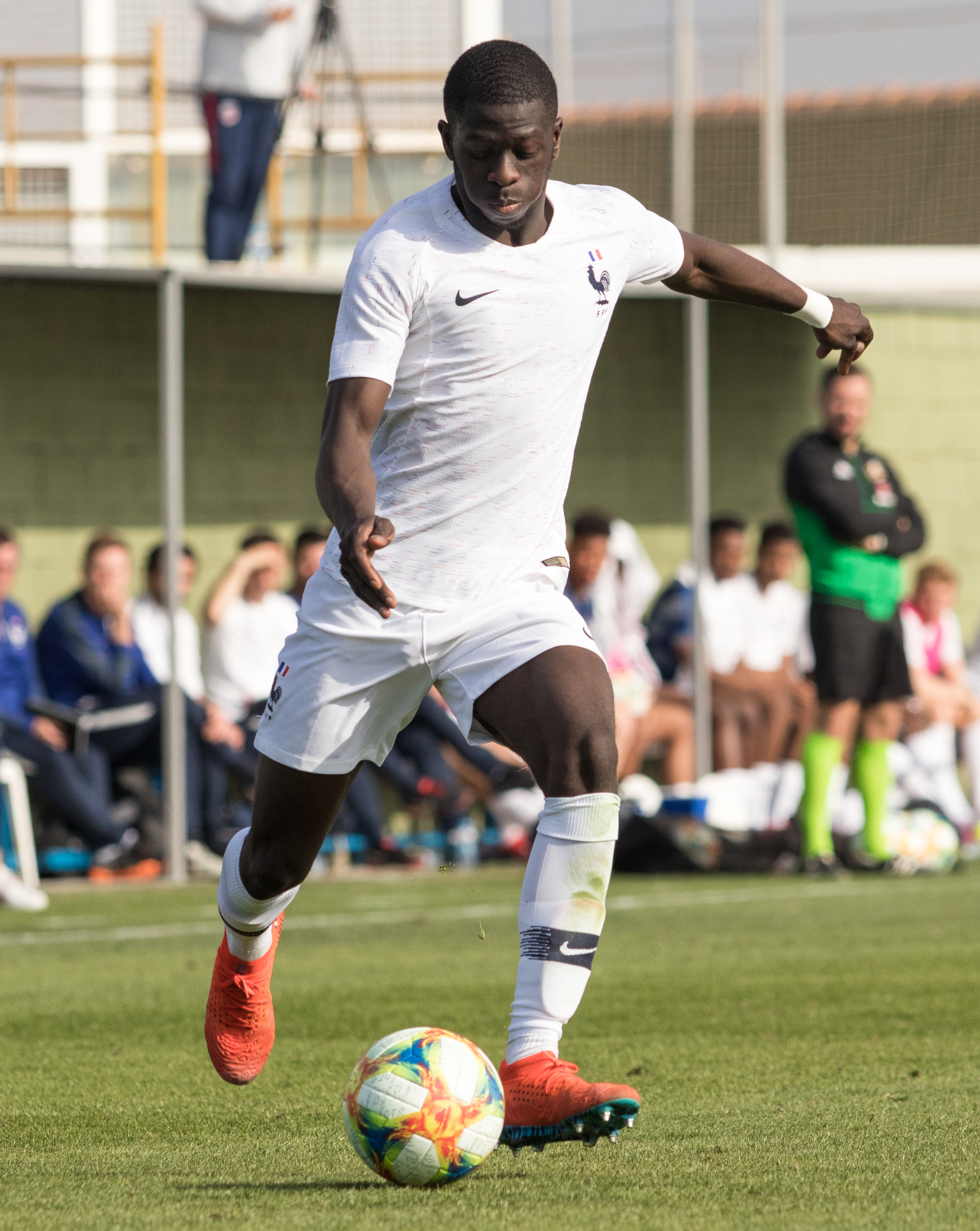
- Sissoko playing for France U20 in 2019

Personal information
- Full name: Sambou Sissoko
- Date of birth: 27 April 1999 (age 27)
- Place of birth: Clamart, France
- Height: 1.86 m (6 ft 1 in)
- Position: Right-back

Team information
- Current team: Valenciennes
- Number: 6

Youth career
- 2005–2009: AS Fontenaisienne
- 2009–2014: Montrouge FC 92
- 2014–2017: Tours

Senior career*
Years	Team	Apps	(Gls)
2016–2017	Tours II	25	(0)
2017–2018	Tours	28	(0)
2019–2022	Reims II	28	(1)
2019–2022	Reims	11	(0)
2020–2021	→ Quevilly-Rouen (loan)	16	(0)
2022–2023	Seraing	39	(2)
2024	Vorskla Poltava	12	(0)
2024–	Valenciennes	35	(3)
2026	→ Qabala (loan)	8	(0)

International career^{‡}
2017–2018	France U19	16	(1)
2018–2019	France U20	5	(0)
- * Club domestic league appearances and goals as of 15 April 2026 ‡ National team caps and goals as of 18:01, 29 April 2021 (UTC)

Sambou Sissoko (born 27 April 1999) is a French professional footballer who plays as a right-back for Ligue 3 club Valenciennes.

== Personal life ==
Sissoko was born in Clamart, France and has French nationality. He is of Malian descent.

== Club career ==
Sissoko made his professional debut with Tours in a 1–0 Ligue 2 loss to Stade de Reims on 11 August 2017.

In January 2019, he signed a four-year contract with Reims. He was loaned to Quevilly-Rouen for the 2020–21 season on 16 October 2020.

On 30 June 2022, Sissoko moved to Seraing in Belgium on a two-year deal. On 20 December 2023, Sissoko and Seraing agreed to terminate the contract.

On 14 February 2024, Sissoko signed with Vorskla Poltava in Ukraine, for an undisclosed term.

On 30 August 2024, Sissoko moved to Valenciennes.

On 11 February 2026, Azerbaijan Premier League club Qabala announced the loan signing of Sissoko from Valenciennes, until the end of the season. On 2 June 2026, Qabala announced that Sissoko had returned to Valenciennes after his loan deal had expired.

== International career ==
Sissoko is a youth international for France at the U19 level.

== Career statistics ==
As of match played 5 April 2026

Appearances and goals by club, season and competition
Club	Season	League			National Cup		Continental		Total	
Club	Season	Division	Apps	Goals	Apps	Goals	Apps	Goals	Apps	Goals
RFC Seraing	2022–23	Belgian Pro League	32	1	2	0	-		34	1
RFC Seraing	2023–24	Challenger Pro League	7	1	0	0	-		7	1
RFC Seraing	Total		39	2	2	0	-	-	41	2
Vorskla Poltava	2023–24	Ukrainian Premier League	12	0	2	0	-		14	0
Valenciennes	2024–25	Championnat National	25	3	1	0	-		26	3
Valenciennes	2025–26	Championnat National	10	0	0	0	-		10	0
Valenciennes	Total		35	3	1	0	-	-	36	3
Gabala (loan)	2025–26	Azerbaijan Premier League	8	0	0	0	-		8	0
Career total			94	5	5	0	-	-	99	5
