= Səlahət Ağayev =

Azerbaijani footballer (born 1991)

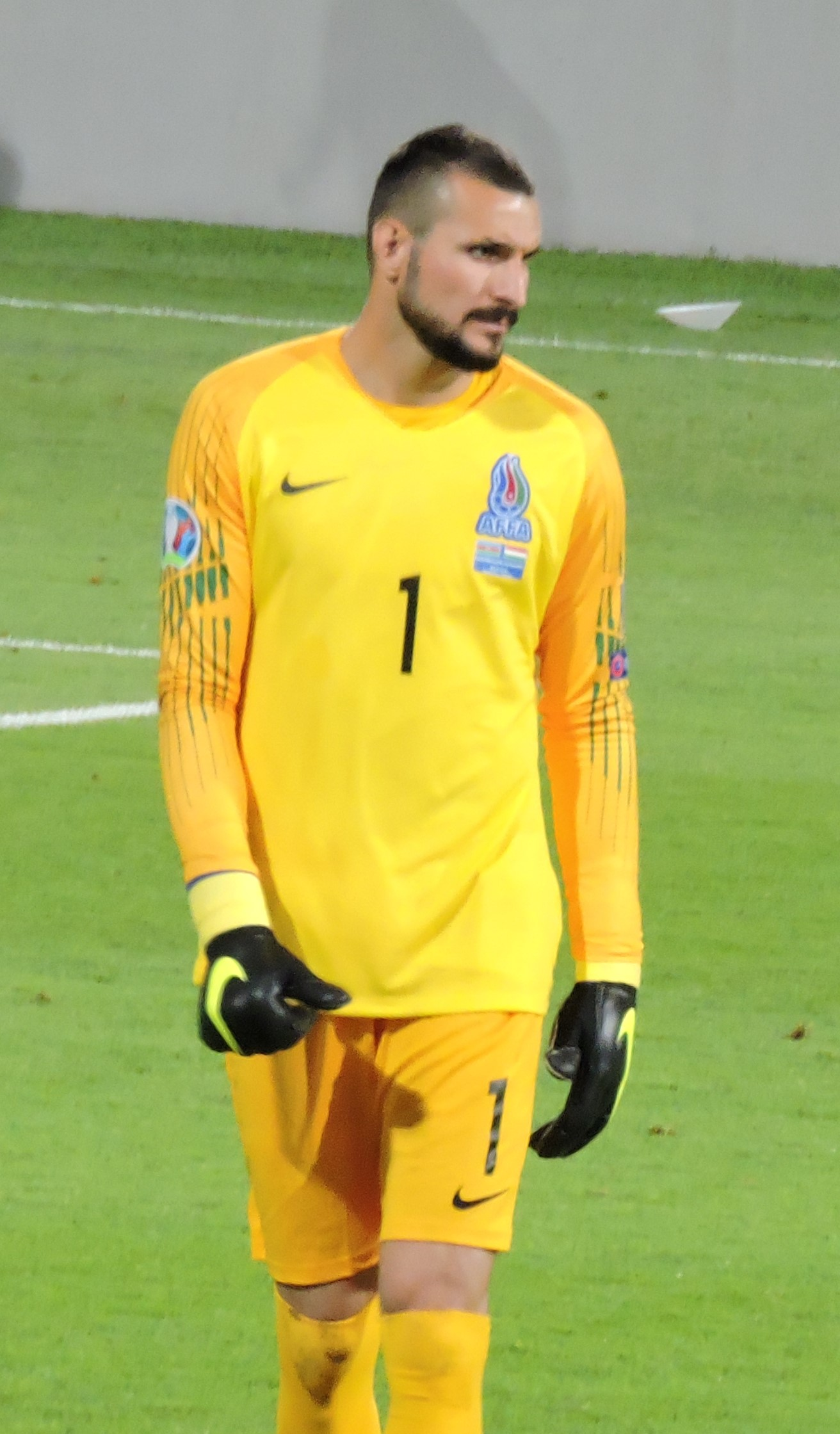
- Ağayev versus Hungary nat. team in Euro 2020 qualifying

Personal information
- Full name: Səlahət Nüsrət oğlu Ağayev
- Date of birth: 4 January 1991 (age 35)
- Place of birth: Füzuli, Azerbaijan
- Height: 1.92 m (6 ft 3 1/2 in)
- Position: Goalkeeper

Team information
- Current team: Gabala
- Number: 1

Senior career*
Years	Team	Apps	(Gls)
2008–2015	Inter Baku	69	(0)
2011	→ MOIK Baku (loan)	8	(0)
2012–2013	→ Sumgayit (loan)	23	(0)
2016	Sumgayit	16	(0)
2016–2017	Inter Baku	22	(0)
2017–2021	Neftchi Baku	56	(0)
2021–2022	Sabah	17	(0)
2022–2023	Gabala	30	(0)
2023–2024	Sabail	31	(0)
2024–	Gabala	60	(0)

International career^{‡}
2007–2008	Azerbaijan U17	3	(0)
2008–2009	Azerbaijan U19	5	(0)
2009–2011	Azerbaijan U21	8	(0)
2010–	Azerbaijan	21	(0)
- * Club domestic league appearances and goals as of 13 November 2026 ‡ National team caps and goals as of 29 March 2022

Səlahət Nüsrət oğlu Ağayev (born 4 January 1991) is an Azerbaijani professional footballer who plays as a goalkeeper for Gabala in Azerbaijan Premier League.

== Career ==
Born in Füzuli, Ağayev has played club football for Inter Baku, MOIK Baku and Sumgayit.

On 13 January 2016, Ağayev signed with Sumgayit.

On 1 June 2019, Ağayev signed a new two-year contract with Neftçi Baku.

On 4 June 2022, Gabala announced the signing of Ağayev on a one-year contract. On 14 June 2023, Gabala confirmed the departure of Ağayev following the expiration of his contract.

On 1 August 2024, Gabala announced the return of free-agent Ağayev to a one-year contract.

=== International ===
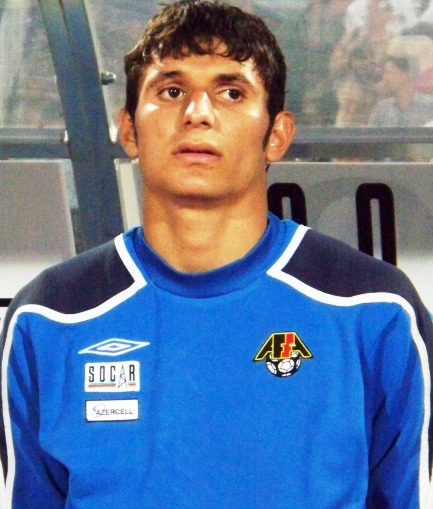

Ağayev made his senior international debut for Azerbaijan in 2010.

== Career statistics ==
As of match played 7 November 2026

Appearances and goals by club, season and competition
Club	Season	League			National Cup		Continental		Other		Total	
Club	Season	Division	Apps	Goals	Apps	Goals	Apps	Goals	Apps	Goals	Apps	Goals
Inter Baku	2011–12	Azerbaijan Premier League	3	0	0	0	0	0	-		3	0
Inter Baku	2012–13	Azerbaijan Premier League	0	0	0	0	0	0	-		0	0
Inter Baku	2013–14	Azerbaijan Premier League	25	0	3	0	0	0	-		28	0
Inter Baku	2014–15	Azerbaijan Premier League	28	0	3	0	0	0	-		31	0
Inter Baku	2015–16	Azerbaijan Premier League	13	0	0	0	6	0	-		19	0
Inter Baku	Total		69	0	6	0	6	0	-	-	81	0
MOIK Baku (loan)	2010–11	Azerbaijan Premier League	8	0	0	0	-		-		8	0
Sumgayit (loan)	2012–13	Azerbaijan Premier League	23	0	0	0	-		-		23	0
Sumgayit	2015–16	Azerbaijan Premier League	16	0	1	0	-		-		17	0
Inter Baku	2016–17	Azerbaijan Premier League	22	0	2	0	-		-		24	0
Neftchi Baku	2017–18	Azerbaijan Premier League	11	0	0	0	-		-		11	0
Neftchi Baku	2018–19	Azerbaijan Premier League	28	0	2	0	2	0	-		32	0
Neftchi Baku	2019–20	Azerbaijan Premier League	16	0	2	0	6	0	-		24	0
Neftchi Baku	2020–21	Azerbaijan Premier League	1	0	2	0	0	0	-		3	0
Neftchi Baku	Total		56	0	6	0	8	0	-	-	70	0
Sabah	2021–22	Azerbaijan Premier League	17	0	3	0	-		-		20	0
Gabala	2022–23	Azerbaijan Premier League	30	0	2	0	2	0	-		34	0
Sabail	2023–24	Azerbaijan Premier League	31	0	1	0	-		-		32	0
Gabala	2024–25	Azerbaijan First League	24	0	2	0	-		-		26	0
Gabala	2025–26	Azerbaijan Premier League	25	0	2	0	-		1	0	28	0
Gabala	2026–27	Azerbaijan Premier League	11	0	0	0	-		-		11	0
Gabala	Total		60	0	4	0	-	-	1	0	65	0
Career total			332	0	25	0	16	0	1	0	374	0

=== International ===
Azerbaijan
Year	Apps	Goals
2010	1	0
2011	0	0
2012	1	0
2013	3	0
2014	2	0
2015	1	0
2016	1	0
2017	2	0
2018	3	0
2019	4	0
2020	0	0
2021	0	0
2022	2	0
Total	20	0

Statistics accurate as of match played 29 March 2022
