= Kouya Mabea =

Ivorian footballer (born 1998)

Personal information
- Full name: Kouya Aristide Mabea
- Date of birth: 23 October 1998 (age 28)
- Place of birth: Abidjan, Ivory Coast
- Height: 1.77 m (5 ft 10 in)
- Position: Left-back

Team information
- Current team: Qabala
- Number: 12

Youth career
- –2016: SOA
- 2017–2019: Vitória de Guimarães

Senior career*
Years	Team	Apps	(Gls)
2016–2017	SOA		
2018–2020	Vitória de Guimarães B	13	(0)
2020–2023	Westerlo	41	(0)
2023–2024	Hapoel Hadera	15	(0)
2024	Hapoel Rishon LeZion	16	(0)
2024–2025	UTA Arad	16	(1)
2025–2026	Floriana	21	(0)
2026–	Qabala	10	(1)
- * Club domestic league appearances and goals as of 13 November 2026

Kouya Aristide Mabea (born 23 October 1998) is an Ivorian professional footballer who plays as a left-back for Azerbaijan Premier League club Qabala.

== Career ==
On 29 June 2026, Azerbaijan Premier League club Qabala announced the signing of Mabea to a one-year contract, with the option of a second year.

== Career statistics ==
As of match played on 7 November 2026

Appearances and goals by club, season and competition
Club	Season	League			National cup		League cup		Continental		Other		Total	
Club	Season	Division	Apps	Goals	Apps	Goals	Apps	Goals	Apps	Goals	Apps	Goals	Apps	Goals
Hapoel Hadera	2023–24	Israeli Premier League	15	0	0	0	—		—		—		15	0
Hapoel Rishon LeZion	2023–24	Liga Leumit	16	0	1	0	—		—		—		17	0
UTA Arad	2024–25	Liga I	16	1	2	0	—		—		—		18	1
Floriana	2025–26	Maltese Premier League	22	0	1	0	—		—		1	0	24	0
Qabala	2026–27	Azerbaijan Premier League	10	1	0	0	—		—		—		10	1
Career total			79	2	4	0	-	-	-	-	1	0	84	2

== Honours ==
Westerlo

- Belgian First Division B: 2021–22
