= Ismahil Akinade =

Nigerian footballer

Personal information
- Date of birth: 11 February 1994 (age 32)
- Place of birth: Ibadan, Nigeria
- Height: 1.90 m (6 ft 3 in)
- Position: Forward

Team information
- Current team: Qabala
- Number: 24

Youth career
- St Patrick's Athletic

Senior career*
Years	Team	Apps	(Gls)
2012–2014	Bray Wanderers	64	(8)
2015–2017	Bohemians	52	(19)
2018–2019	Waterford	49	(8)
2019	Ho Chi Minh City	10	(4)
2020	SHB Da Nang	14	(7)
2021	Hong Linh Ha Tinh	12	(1)
2021–2022	Telecom Egypt SC		
2022	Sheikh Russel KC	10	(6)
2023	Kelantan	10	(4)
2023–2024	Kelantan United	11	(4)
2024–2025	Terengganu	20	(5)
2025	Andijon	12	(2)
2026–	Qabala	27	(5)
- * Club domestic league appearances and goals as of 13 November 2026 (UTC)

Ismahil Akinade (born 11 February 1994) is a Nigerian professional footballer who plays as a forward for Azerbaijan Premier League club Qabala.

== Career ==
=== Bray Wanderers ===
Akinade started his senior career with Bray Wanderers where he was a huge hit with fans and won the club's Young Player of the Year award for the 2013 season. Akinade parted ways with Bray at the end of the 2014 season after he played a huge part in guaranteeing the Seagulls' safety in the Premier Division.

=== Bohemians ===
Midway through the 2015 League of Ireland season, Akinade signed for Bohemians, making his debut in a 2–1 win away to Dundalk on 6 June, setting up the first goal. Akinade was nominated for Young Player Of The Year after scoring 10 goals in 18 matches in his first season with the club. In October 2015, he agreed to a new contract. Akinade went on to score 5 goals in 18 appearances for the 2016 season and in the 2017 season injury ruled him out for the first half of the season, when he returned he scored memorable goals against fierce rivals Shamrock Rovers in a 2–1 win in Tallaght and the winner against Dundalk in Oriel Park.

=== Waterford ===
Akinade left Bohs to sign for Waterford for the 2018 League of Ireland Premier Division season. Akinade made his debut in a 2–1 win against Derry City on 17 February 2018. He departed from the club by mutual agreement on 24 June 2019.

=== Hồ Chí Minh City ===
On 28 June 2019, V.League 1 side Hồ Chí Minh City announced the signing of Akinade. He made a scoring debut for the club that same day in a game against Viettel FC in the Vietnamese National Football Cup. He left at the end of the season following 5 goals in 11 games, with the club looking to replace him with former Liverpool striker David Ngog.

=== CLB SHB Đà Nẵng ===
In November 2019, Akinade signed a one-year contract with CLB SHB Đà Nẵng, also of the V.League 1.

=== Terengganu ===
Akinade signed a one-year contract with Malaysia Super League club Terengganu in February 2024.

=== Qabala ===
On 7 January 2026, Azerbaijan Premier League club Qabala announced the signing of Akinade from Andijon on a contract until the summer of 2027.

== Legal issues ==
It was reported in October 2014 that Akinade and two other people had received suspended sentences for the 2010 sexual abuse of a 14-year-old girl in Kildare.

In April 2017, Akinade was issued a deportation order. His application to have the deportation stopped was rejected in the High Court in May 2019. He returned to Nigeria voluntarily in June.

== Personal life ==
He is the cousin of Fuad Sule, who is also a professional footballer.

In 2017, Akinade was absent for half the season due to an illness, in February 2017 he had his spleen removed and returned in June 2018.

== Career statistics ==
As of match played on 7 November 2026

Appearances and goals by club, season and competition
Club	Season	League			National cup		League cup		Continental		Other		Total	
Club	Season	Division	Apps	Goals	Apps	Goals	Apps	Goals	Apps	Goals	Apps	Goals	Apps	Goals
Bray Wanderers	2012	League of Ireland Premier Division	5	0	0	0	0	0	—		0 (Note: Appearances in Leinster Senior Cup)	0	5	0
Bray Wanderers	2013	League of Ireland Premier Division	31	6	2	0	1	1	—		4 (Note: 2 appearances in League of Ireland Promotion/Relegation Playoff, 2 appearances & 3 goals in Leinster Senior Cup)	3	38	10
Bray Wanderers	2014	League of Ireland Premier Division	28	2	0	0	2	0	—		0	0	30	2
Bray Wanderers	Total		63	8	2	0	3	1	0	0	4	3	73	12
Bohemians	2015	League of Ireland Premier Division	19	10	1	0	0	0	—		1	0	21	10
Bohemians	2016	League of Ireland Premier Division	18	5	1	0	1	0	—		2	2	22	7
Bohemians	2017	League of Ireland Premier Division	15	4	1	0	0	0	—		0	0	16	4
Bohemians	Total		52	19	3	0	1	0	0	0	3	2	59	21
Waterford	2018	League of Ireland Premier Division	32	5	3	0	2	1	—		0 (Note: Appearances in Munster Senior Cup)	0	37	6
Waterford	2019	League of Ireland Premier Division	17	3	0	0	2	0	—		0	0	19	3
Waterford	Total		49	8	3	0	4	1	0	0	0	0	56	9
Hồ Chí Minh City	2019	V.League 1	10	4	1	1	—		—		—		11	5
SHB Da Nang	2020	V.League 1	14	7	0	0	—		—		—		14	7
Hong Linh Ha Tinh	2021	V.League 1	12	1	0	0	—		—		—		12	1
Telecom Egypt SC	2021–22	Egyptian Second Division					—		—		—			
Sheikh Russel KC	2022	Bangladesh Premier League	10	6	0	0	—		—		—		10	6
Kelantan	2023	Malaysia Super League	10	4	2	2	—		—		—		12	6
Kelantan United	2023	Malaysia Super League	11	4	—		—		—		—		11	4
Terengganu	2024–25	Malaysia Super League	20	5	4	4	4	1	—		—		28	10
Andijon	2025	Uzbekistan Super League	12	2	—		—		6 (Note: Appearances in AFC Champions League Two)	1	—		18	3
Qabala	2025–26	Azerbaijan Premier League	16	3	2	2	—		—		1	0	19	5
Qabala	2026–27	Azerbaijan Premier League	11	2	0	0	—		—		—		11	2
Qabala	Total		27	5	2	2	0	0	0	0	1	0	30	7
Career total			280	73	17	9	12	3	6	1	8	5	334	91

== Honours ==
Bohemians

- Lenister Senior Cup: 2015–16
