= Jaime Sierra =

Spanish footballer (born 1998)

Personal information
- Full name: Jaime Sierra Mateos
- Date of birth: 18 March 1998 (age 28)
- Place of birth: Madrid, Spain
- Height: 1.75 m (5 ft 9 in)
- Position: Midfielder

Team information
- Current team: Gabala
- Number: 6

Youth career
- 2003–2004: EF Carabanchel
- 2004–2014: Real Madrid
- 2014–2017: Valencia

Senior career*
| Years | Team | Apps | (Gls) |
| 2017–2019 | Leganés B | 57 | (2) |
| 2018–2019 | Leganés | 2 | (0) |
| 2019–2022 | Logroñés | 57 | (1) |
| 2022 | Cultural Leonesa | 15 | (1) |
| 2022–2023 | Logroñés | 32 | (1) |
| 2023–2024 | Atlético Baleares | 20 | (0) |
| 2024 | Deinze | 20 | (0) |
| 2025 | Varaždin | 6 | (0) |
| 2025– | Gabala | 40 | (0) |
- * Club domestic league appearances and goals as of 13 November 2026

Jaime Sierra Mateos (born 18 March 1998) is a Spanish footballer who plays as a central midfielder for Azeri club Gabala.

== Club career ==
Born in Madrid, Sierra joined Real Madrid's youth setup in 2004, from EF Carabanchel. In July 2014, he moved to Valencia CF, being assigned to the Juvenil squad.

In August 2017, free agent Sierra moved to CD Leganés, being assigned to the reserves in Tercera División. He made his senior debut late in the month, coming on as a second-half substitute in a 3–2 away win against AD Alcorcón B.

Sierra made his first team – and La Liga – debut on 28 January 2018, replacing José Naranjo in a 3–2 home win against RCD Espanyol.

On 1 February 2024, Sierra signed with Deinze in Belgium. He left the club in December 2024 after Deinze was declared bankrupt and ceased operations.

On 10 August 2025, Azerbaijan Premier League club Gabala announced the signing of Sierra from NK Varaždin, to a two-year contract.

== Career statistics ==
As of match played 7 November 2026

Appearances and goals by club, season and competition
| Club | Season | League | | | National Cup | | Continental | | Other | | Total | |
| Club | Season | Division | Apps | Goals | Apps | Goals | Apps | Goals | Apps | Goals | Apps | Goals |
|---|---|---|---|---|---|---|---|---|---|---|---|---|
| Atlético Baleares | 2023–24 | Primera Federación | 20 | 0 | 0 | 0 | - | | - | | 20 | 0 |
| Deinze | 2023–24 | Challenger Pro League | 10 | 0 | 0 | 0 | - | | - | | 10 | 0 |
| Deinze | 2024–25 | Challenger Pro League | 10 | 0 | 1 | 0 | - | | - | | 11 | 0 |
| Deinze | Total | | 20 | 0 | 1 | 0 | 0 | 0 | 0 | 0 | 21 | 0 |
| Varaždin | 2024–25 | Croatian Football League | 7 | 0 | 0 | 0 | 1 (Note: Appearances in UEFA Conference League) | 0 | - | | 8 | 0 |
| Gabala | 2025–26 | Azerbaijan Premier League | 30 | 0 | 4 | 0 | - | | 1 | 0 | 35 | 0 |
| Gabala | 2026–27 | Azerbaijan Premier League | 10 | 0 | 0 | 0 | — | | — | | 10 | 0 |
| Gabala | Total | | 40 | 0 | 4 | 0 | - | - | 1 | 0 | 45 | 0 |
| Career total | | | 87 | 0 | 5 | 0 | 1 | 0 | 1 | 0 | 94 | 0 |
