= Fariz Najafov =

Azerbaijani karateka and military officer (born 1978)

- Born: Fariz Abdulla oglu Najafov; June 1, 1978 (age 48); Kəngərli, Aghdam District, Azerbaijani SSR, Soviet Union
- Citizenship: Soviet Union (1978–1991); Azerbaijan (1991–)
- Education: Azerbaijan University of Architecture and Construction; Baku State University
- Occupations: Karateka; President of Gabala Sports Club (2019–); military officer

Fariz Abdulla oglu Najafov (Azerbaijani: Fariz Abdulla oğlu Nəcəfov; born 1 June 1978) is an Azerbaijani karateka, serving as the President of Gabala Sports Club. As an officer serving in the Azerbaijani Armed Forces, he fought in the 2020 Nagorno-Karabakh war.

== Life ==
=== Early life ===
Fariz Abdulla oglu Najafov was born on 1 June 1978 in Kəngərli, located in the Aghdam District of the Azerbaijani SSR, then Soviet Union. He was a student of the first vice-president of the Azerbaijan Taekwondo Federation Fuzuli Musayev and became World and European champion in karate on several occasions.

=== Career and military service ===
Fariz Najafov was appointed vice-president of Gabala Sports Club in 2008. Gabala SC achieved various milestones during Najafov's vice-presidency. During his tenure, Gabala FC became the third Azerbaijani football club to qualify for the group stage of the UEFA Europa League after Neftçi and Qarabağ in the 2015–2016 UEFA Europa League season. Also, in the Azerbaijani Premier League, Gabala finished the 2013–2014, 2014–2015, 2015–2016 seasons in third place, while in 2016–2017 and 2017–2018, it finished the league as runners-up. On 18 April 2019, Najafov replaced Kamaladdin Heydarov's son Tale Heydarov and was appointed the President of Gabala Sports Club. On 11 July 2019, he was awarded the Azerbaijan Democratic Republic 100th anniversary medal.

Fariz Najafov voluntarily joined the Azerbaijani forces as a reservist officer during the 2020 Nagorno-Karabakh war, which began on September 27, and continued his military service in the frontline during the war.
