= Karim Rossi =

Swiss footballer (born 1994)

- Rossi with Qabala in 2026

Personal information
- Date of birth: 1 May 1994 (age 32)
- Place of birth: Zürich, Switzerland
- Height: 1.89 m (6 ft 2 in)
- Position: Forward

Team information
- Current team: Qabala
- Number: 9

Youth career
- Lausanne-Sport
- 2010–2011: Grasshopper
- 2011–2014: Stoke City

Senior career*
Years	Team	Apps	(Gls)
2014–2015	Hull City	0	(0)
2015	→ Zulte Waregem (loan)	12	(4)
2015–2016	Spezia	12	(0)
2016–2017	Lugano	5	(0)
2016	→ Schaffhausen (loan)	12	(1)
2017–2019	Cambuur	28	(8)
2019	Telstar	6	(0)
2019–2020	Chiasso	15	(2)
2020–2021	AFC Eskilstuna	20	(2)
2021	Tsarsko Selo	13	(0)
2021–2022	Racing-Union	25	(13)
2022–2023	Dewa United	31	(11)
2023–2024	Karmiotissa	37	(8)
2024–2025	Persis Solo	19	(2)
2025	FC Schaffhausen	14	(2)
2025–2026	Şamaxı	31	(10)
2026–	Qabala	8	(1)
- * Club domestic league appearances and goals as of 13 November 2026

Karim Rossi (born 1 May 1994) is a Swiss professional footballer who plays as a forward for Azerbaijan Premier League club Qabala.

== Career ==
=== Earlier career ===
Rossi began his career in his native Switzerland with Lausanne-Sport and Grasshopper Club Zürich before joining English club Stoke City in the summer of 2011. Rossi spent three seasons at Stoke playing for the club's under-18 and under-21 sides.

In July 2014, Rossi left Stoke and joined Hull City. Playing and scoring regularly for the Reserve side, Rossi was linked with loan moves to clubs in The Football League.

=== Zulte Waregem ===
On 23 January 2015, Rossi signed for Belgian Pro League side Zulte Waregem on a six-month loan from Hull City. He made his professional debut on 1 February 2015 in a 0–0 draw with Anderlecht. On 7 February 2015, he scored his first and second professional goals against Lierse coming on as a half time substitute.

=== Spezia ===
On 15 July 2015, Rossi signed for Serie B side Spezia Calcio. On 8 August 2015, he made his home debut in a 1–0 win against Brescia Calcio in the Coppa Italia.

On 26 January 2016, after a lack of game time and frustrations, Rossi left and signed for Swiss Super League, Lugano for an undisclosed fee.

=== Lugano ===
Rossi made a successful debut against Thun on 13 February 2016 despite the 2–1 loss. On 29 May 2016, he made an appearance in the Swiss Cup final which was lost 2–1 against Zürich.

On 16 August 2016, Rossi joined Schaffhausen on loan from Lugano until the end of the year.

=== Şamaxı ===
On 7 July 2025, Azerbaijan Premier League club Şamaxı announced the signing of Rossi to a one-year contract.

=== Qabala ===
On 10 July 2026, fellow Azerbaijan Premier League club, Qabala, announced the signing of Rossi to a two-year contract.

== Personal life ==
Rossi is of Moroccan descent. His uncle, Youssef Rossi, also played professional football.

== Career statistics ==
As of match played on 23 October 2026

Appearances and goals by club, season and competition
Club	Season	League			National cup		League cup		Continental		Other		Total	
Club	Season	Division	Apps	Goals	Apps	Goals	Apps	Goals	Apps	Goals	Apps	Goals	Apps	Goals
Dewa United	2022–23	Liga 1	27	9	4	2	—		—		—		31	11
Karmiotissa	2023–24	Cypriot First Division	37	8	0	0	—		—		—		37	8
Persis Solo	2024–25	Liga 1	19	2	5	0	—		—		—		24	2
Schaffhausen	2024–25	Swiss Challenge League	14	2	0	0	—		—		—		14	2
Şamaxı	2025–26	Azerbaijan Premier League	31	10	4	3	—		—		—		35	13
Qabala	2026–27	Azerbaijan Premier League	8	1	1	0	—		—		—		9	1
Career total			109	23	10	3	-	-	-	-	-	-	119	26
