= Ibrahim Sangaré (French footballer) =

French footballer (born 1994)

Personal information
- Full name: Ibrahim Sangaré
- Date of birth: 15 March 1994 (age 32)
- Place of birth: Montreuil, Seine-Saint-Denis, France
- Height: 1.86 m (6 ft 1 in)
- Position: Forward

Youth career
- 2011–2013: Guingamp

Senior career*
Years	Team	Apps	(Gls)
2013–2014	L'Entente SSG	14	(3)
2014–2016	Chambly	39	(7)
2016–2017	Avranches	31	(8)
2017–2018	Auxerre	25	(1)
2017–2018	Auxerre II	12	(3)
2018–2019	Giresunspor	4	(0)
2019	Menemenspor	7	(0)
2020–2021	Créteil	28	(9)
2021–2022	Orléans	22	(6)
2022–2023	Le Puy	31	(6)
2023–2024	Othellos Athienou	30	(7)
2024–2025	Hapoel Hadera	21	(3)
2025–2026	Gabala	24	(2)
- * Club domestic league appearances and goals as of 1 June 2026

Ibrahim Sangaré (born 15 March 1994) is a French professional footballer who plays as a forward, most recently for Azerbaijan Premier League club Gabala.

== Career ==
Sangaré signed his first professional contract for Auxerre on 3 February 2017, having worked his way up in the lower French divisions with L'Entente SSG, Chambly, and Avranches. Sangaré made his professional debut for Auxerre in a 2–0 loss to US Orléans on 4 February 2017 in the Ligue 2.

Sangaré spent 18 months in Turkey with Giresunspor and Menemenspor from June 2018, returning to France to sign for Créteil in February 2020. He further signed for Orléans, and Le Puy Foot 43.

On 4 August 2025, Azerbaijan Premier League club Gabala announced the signing of Sangaré from Hapoel Hadera, to a one-year contract. On 1 June 2026, Gabala announced that Sangaré had left the club after his contract had expired.

== Personal life ==
Sangaré was born in France, and is of Ivorian descent.

== Career statistics ==
As of match played 28 May 2026

Appearances and goals by club, season and competition
Club	Season	League			National Cup		League Cup		Continental		Other		Total	
Club	Season	Division	Apps	Goals	Apps	Goals	Apps	Goals	Apps	Goals	Apps	Goals	Apps	Goals
Le Puy Foot 43	2022–23	Championnat National	31	6	2	0	-		-		-		33	6
Othellos Athienou	2023–24	Cypriot First Division	30	7	1	1	-		-		-		31	8
Hapoel Hadera	2024–25	Israeli Premier League	21	3	1	1	4	0	-		-		26	4
Gabala	2025–26	Azerbaijan Premier League	24	2	1	2	-		-		1	0	26	4
Career total			106	18	5	4	4	0	-	-	1	0	116	21
