= Seydina Keita =

Senegalese footballer (born 1992)

Personal information
- Full name: Seydina Aboubakr Lamine Keita
- Date of birth: 28 December 1992 (age 33)
- Place of birth: Pikine, Senegal
- Height: 1.76 m (5 ft 9 in)
- Position: Defender

Team information
- Current team: Panevėžys
- Number: 33

Senior career*
Years	Team	Apps	(Gls)
–2017	Diambars		
2014	→ Molde (loan)	0	(0)
2017–2022	Liepāja	126	(9)
2022–2023	Panevėžys	47	(3)
2024–2025	Al-Tadamon		
2025	Panevėžys	15	(0)
2026	Qabala	17	(3)
2026–	Panevėžys	5	(0)
- * Club domestic league appearances and goals as of 1 October 2026

Seydina Aboubakr Lamine Keita (born 28 December 1992) is a Senegalese professional footballer who plays as a defender, for Panevėžys in TOPLYGA.

== Career ==
=== Molde ===
On 22 August 2014, Keita joined Norwegian Eliteserien club Molde on loan for the remainder of the 2014 season. On 20 January 2015, Modle confirmed that Keita had left the club after his loan deal had expired.

=== Panevėžys ===
On 4 August 2022, Lithuanian TOPLYGA club Panevėžys announced the signing of Keita on a contract until the end of the 2022 season. On 21 January 2024, Panevėžys confirmed that Keita had left the club after receiving a more profitable offer from a foreign team.

On 13 June 2025, Keita returned to Panevėžys on a contract until the end of the 2025 season. On 6 January 2026, Panevėžys confirmed that Keita had left the club.

=== Gabala ===
On 5 January 2026, Azerbaijan Premier League club Qabala announced the signing of Keita from Panevėžys, to a six-month contract, with the option of an additional year. On 25 June 2026, Gabala announced that they had extended their contract with Keita until the summer of 2027. On 6 July 2026, Gabala announced that they had parted ways with Keita by mutual agreement due to personal circumstances relating to Keita.

=== Panevėžys ===
On 9 July 2026, Panevėžys announced the return of Keita for a second time, signing a contract until the summer of 2028.

== Career statistics ==
As of match played 28 May 2026

Appearances and goals by club, season and competition
Club	Season	League			National cup (Note: Includes Lithuanian Football Cup, Azerbaijan Cup)		Continental		Other		Total	
Club	Season	Division	Apps	Goals	Apps	Goals	Apps	Goals	Apps	Goals	Apps	Goals
Panevėžys	2022	A Lyga	16	1	2	0	—		—		18	0
Panevėžys	2023	A Lyga	31	2	0	0	4 (Note: Appearances and goals in the UEFA Conference League)	1	—		35	3
Panevėžys	Total		47	3	2	0	4	1	0	0	53	3
Al-Tadamon	2023–24	Kuwaiti Division One					—		—			
Al-Tadamon	2024–25	Kuwait Premier League					—		—			
Al-Tadamon	Total											
Panevėžys	2025	A Lyga	15	0	3	0	—		—		18	0
Qabala	2025–26	Azerbaijan Premier League	17	3	2	0	—		1 (Note: Appearance in the Azerbaijani Relegation Play-off)	1	20	4
Panevėžys	2026	Toplyga	5	0	0	0	2	1	—		7	1
Career total			84	6	7	0	6	2	1	1	98	8

== Honours ==
Liepāja

- Latvian Football Cup: 2017, 2020

Panevėžys

- TOPLYGA: 2023
- Lithuanian Football Cup: 2025
