= Eduardo Kunde =

Brazilian footballer (born 1997)

Personal information
- Full name: Eduardo Lecke Kunde
- Date of birth: 17 September 1997 (age 29)
- Place of birth: Montenegro, Brazil
- Height: 1.87 m (6 ft 2 in)
- Position: Centre-back

Team information
- Current team: Olympiakos Nicosia

Youth career
- Internacional
- Criciúma
- Avaí

Senior career*
Years	Team	Apps	(Gls)
2018–2021	Avaí	25	(0)
2020	→ Cuiabá (loan)	7	(0)
2021–2022	SC Sagamihara	7	(0)
2023	Brusque	1	(0)
2023–2024	Botev Vratsa	20	(0)
2024–2025	Persis Solo	23	(0)
2025–2026	Gabala	23	(0)
2026-	Olympiakos Nicosia		
- * Club domestic league appearances and goals as of 14 June 2026

Eduardo Lecke Kunde (born 17 September 1997) is a Brazilian professional footballer who plays as a centre-back, most recently for Cypriot First Division club Olympiakos Nicosia.

== Club career ==
Kunde was born in Montenegro, Rio Grande do Sul, and represented Avaí as a youth. Promoted to the first team in the latter stages of the 2018 campaign, he remained unused as his side achieved promotion to the Série A.

Kunde made his first team debut on 23 January 2019, starting in a 3–0 Campeonato Catarinense home defeat of Hercílio Luz. He contributed with 11 appearances in the state tournament, as his side was crowned champions.

Kunde made his league debut on 1 May 2019, starting in a 1–1 home draw against Grêmio.

In July 2024, Kunde joined Indonesian Liga 1 club Persis Solo. On 24 June 2025, Kunde officially left Persis Solo.

On 4 August 2025, Azerbaijan Premier League club Gabala announced the signing of Kunde to a one-year contract with the option of an additional year.

== Career statistics ==
As of match played 21 May 2026

Appearances and goals by club, season and competition
Club	Season	League			National Cup		Continental		Total	
Club	Season	Division	Apps	Goals	Apps	Goals	Apps	Goals	Apps	Goals
Gabala	2025–26	Azerbaijan Premier League	23	0	4	0	-		27	0
Career total			23	0	4	0	-	-	27	0

== Honours ==
Avaí

- Campeonato Catarinense: 2019
