= Diogo Almeida =

Portuguese footballer

Personal information
- Full name: Diogo Rafael dos Santos Almeida
- Date of birth: 8 September 2000 (age 26)
- Place of birth: Mortágua, Portugal
- Height: 1.84 m (6 ft 0 in)
- Position: Striker

Team information
- Current team: İmişli
- Number: 9

Youth career
- 2007–2010: Pinguinzinho
- 2010–2012: CB Viseu
- 2012–2013: Lusitano
- 2013–2015: Pinguinzinho
- 2015–2017: Tondela
- 2017–2018: Empoli
- 2018–2019: Paços de Ferreira

Senior career*
Years	Team	Apps	(Gls)
2019–2020	Paços de Ferreira	7	(0)
2020–2021	Benfica B	1	(0)
2021–2022	Covilhã	29	(4)
2022–2024	Mafra	46	(9)
2024–2025	Académico de Viseu	21	(2)
2025–	İmişli	26	(7)

International career^{‡}
2019	Portugal U20	2	(0)
- * Club domestic league appearances and goals as of 22 June 2026 ‡ National team caps and goals as of 7 November 2025

Diogo Rafael dos Santos Almeida (born 8 September 2000) is a Portuguese professional footballer who plays as a striker for Azerbaijani club İmişli.

== Professional career ==
Almeida made his professional debut for Paços de Ferreira in a 0–0 (5–4) Taça da Liga penalty shootout win over Estoril on 3 August 2019.

On 16 June 2024, Almeida signed a three-year contract with Académico de Viseu.
